= 2026 European Athletics Championships – Men's 200 metres =

Men's 200 metres at the 2026 European Athletics Championships
- Venue: Alexander Stadium
- Location: Birmingham, United Kingdom
- Dates: 13 August 2026 (round 1 & semi-finals); 14 August 2026 (final)
- Competitors: 36 (target)
- Winning time: 19.95

Medalists
gold medal	Owen Ansah	Germany
silver medal	Zharnel Hughes	Great Britain
bronze medal	Fausto Desalu	Italy
bronze medal	Timothé Mumenthaler	Switzerland

Official Video Highlights

The men's 200 metres at the 2026 European Athletics Championships took place over three rounds at the Alexander Stadium in Birmingham, United Kingdom, on 13 and 14 August 2026.

== Background ==
Records before the 2026 European Athletics Championships
Record	Athlete (nation)	Time	Location	Date
World record	Usain Bolt (JAM)	19.19	Berlin, Germany	20 August 2009
European record	Pietro Mennea (ITA)	19.72	Mexico City, Mexico	12 September 1979
Championship record	Ramil Guliyev (TUR)	19.76	Berlin, Germany	9 August 2018
World leading	Jaiden Reid (CAY)	19.63	Eugene, United States	12 June 2026
European leading	Zharnel Hughes (GBR)	20.04	Birmingham, United Kingdom	21 June 2026

== Qualification ==
For the men's 200 metres, the qualification period was from 27 July 2025 to 26 July 2026. Athletes qualified by running the entry standard of 20.45 or faster, by wildcard for the 2024 European Athletics Champion, or by their position on the World Athletics Rankings for the event. The target number was 36 athletes.

Qualification standings per 31 July 2026
QP	CP	Country	Athlete	PB	SB	Status	Details
1	1	Switzerland	Timothé Mumenthaler	20.27	20.31	Qualified by Wild Card	Defending European Champion
2	1	Great Britain & N.I.	Zharnel Hughes	19.73	20.04	Qualified by Entry Standard	19.78 - National Stadium, Tokyo (JPN) - 19 SEP 2025
3	1	Italy	Eseosa Fostine Desalu	20.08	20.11	Qualified by Entry Standard	20.11 - Enwag-Stadion, Wetzlar (GER) - 10 JUL 2026
4	1	Germany	Owen Ansah	20.13	20.13	Qualified by Entry Standard	20.13 - Lohrheidestadion, Wattenscheid, Bochum (GER) - 26 JUL 2026
5	1	Belgium	Antoine Snyders	20.24	20.24	Qualified by Entry Standard	20.24 - Sportcentrum Wembley, Kortrijk (BEL) - 11 JUL 2026
6	1	Ireland	Seán Aigboboh	20.27	20.27	Qualified by Entry Standard	20.27 - Carl Lewis TF and Soccer Complex, Houston, TX (USA) - 30 APR 2026
7	2	Germany	Kameron Horton	20.29	20.29	Qualified by Entry Standard	20.29 - Dean A. Hayes Track and Soccer Stadium, Murfreesboro, TN (USA) - 16 MAY 2026
8	1	Sweden	Henrik Larsson	20.32	20.44	Qualified by Entry Standard	20.32 - National Stadium, Tokyo (JPN) - 18 SEP 2025
9	1	Turkey	Oğuz Uyar	20.33	20.33	Qualified by Entry Standard	20.33 - Homer Bryce Stadium, Nacogdoches, TX (USA) - 16 MAY 2026
10	2	Great Britain & N.I.	Nethaneel Mitchell-Blake	19.95	20.35	Qualified by Entry Standard	20.35 - Alexander Stadium, Birmingham (GBR) - 21 JUN 2026
11	2	Switzerland	William Reais	20.24	20.37	Qualified by Entry Standard	20.37 - Letzigrund, Zürich (SUI) - 26 JUL 2026
12	3	Germany	Lucas Ansah-Peprah	20.43	20.50	Qualified by Entry Standard	20.43 - Heinz-Steyer-Stadion, Dresden (GER) - 03 AUG 2025
13	1	Finland	Riku Illukka	20.43	20.43	Qualified by Entry Standard	20.43 - Raatin Stadion, Oulu (FIN) - 01 JUL 2026
reserve	4	Germany	Joshua Hartmann	20.02	20.43	Qualified by Entry Standard	20.43 - Lohrheidestadion, Wattenscheid, Bochum (GER) - 26 JUL 2026
14	1	Portugal	Delvis Santos	20.45	20.45	Qualified by Entry Standard	20.45 - Stadion Juliska, Praha (CZE) - 01 JUN 2026
15	2	Sweden	Erik Erlandsson	20.43	20.67	Qualified by World Rankings	8th - 1182 points
16	2	Italy	Filippo Tortu	20.10	20.41	Qualified by World Rankings	9th - 1176 points
17	1	Lithuania	Gediminas Truskauskas	20.48	20.59	Qualified by World Rankings	11th - 1176 points
18	1	Norway	Andreas Ofstad Kulseng	20.53	20.53	Qualified by World Rankings	12th - 1175 points
19	1	Latvia	Oskars Grava	20.49	20.49	Qualified by World Rankings	18th - 1169 points
20	1	Greece	Sotirios Gkaragkanis	20.66	20.69	Qualified by World Rankings	19th - 1168 points
21	1	Czech Republic	Ondřej Macík	20.39	20.65	Qualified by World Rankings	27th - 1156 points
22	3	Great Britain & N.I.	Ebuka Nwokeji	20.55	20.55	Qualified by World Rankings	30th - 1153 points
23	2	Turkey	Deniz Kaan Kartal	20.67	20.67	Qualified by World Rankings	33rd - 1145 points
24	1	Estonia	Henri Sai	20.69	20.69	Qualified by World Rankings	36th - 1145 points
25	1	Israel	Gal Arad	20.63	20.63	Qualified by World Rankings	39th - 1143 points
26	3	Sweden	Linus Pihl	20.69	20.69	Qualified by World Rankings	40th - 1143 points
27	1	Slovakia	Ján Volko	20.24	20.81	Qualified by World Rankings	41st - 1142 points
28	3	Italy	Filippo Dezza	20.48	20.48	Qualified by World Rankings	42nd - 1141 points
reserve	4	Sweden	Zion Eriksson	20.68	20.68	Qualified by World Rankings	44th - 1141 points
reserve	4	Italy	Eduardo Longobardi	20.53	20.61	Qualified by World Rankings	48th - 1138 points
29	2	Ireland	Marcus Lawler	20.40	20.79	Qualified by World Rankings	51st - 1133 points
30	1	Croatia	Karlo Marciuš	20.57	21.07	Qualified by World Rankings	52nd - 1131 points
31	2	Greece	Vasileios Myrianthopoulos	20.62	20.62	Qualified by World Rankings	53rd - 1131 points
32	3	Switzerland	Felix Svensson	20.30	20.78	Qualified by World Rankings	54th - 1131 points
33	2	Norway	Kenny Emi Tijani-Ajayi	20.71	20.71	Qualified by World Rankings	55th - 1130 points
reserve	5	Italy	Damiano Dentato	20.64	20.64	Qualified by World Rankings	56th - 1130 points
34	1	Spain	Oriol Sánchez	20.68	20.68	Qualified by World Rankings	58th - 1124 points
35	1	Serbia	Darijo Bašić Palković	20.75	20.75	Qualified by World Rankings	63rd - 1117 points
36	3	Turkey	Kubilay Ençü	20.79	20.79	Qualified by World Rankings	67th - 1115 points
reserve	1	Slovenia	Andrej Skočir	20.78	20.89	Next best by World Rankings	69th - 1114 points
reserve	3	Ireland	Ryan Mulholland	20.49	20.58	Next best by World Rankings	82nd - 1103 points
reserve	2	Finland	Eljas Aalto	20.90	20.90	Next best by World Rankings	91st - 1098 points
reserve	1	Bulgaria	Nikola Karamanolov	20.97	20.97	Next best by World Rankings	156th - 1061 points

Bye to semi-finals	Reserve activated	Withdrawal / reserve unused

== Schedule ==
Date	Time	Round
13 August 2026	11:05	Round 1
13 August 2026	20:05	Semi-finals
14 August 2026	21:25	Final

All times are local times (UTC+1)

== Results ==
=== Round 1 ===
Round 1 was held on 13 August 2026, at 11:05 in the morning. 13 best performers (q) advanced to the semi-finals.

==== Heat 1 ====
Place	Lane	Athlete	Nation	Time	Notes
1	6	Joshua Hartmann	Germany	20.61	q
2	4	Kenny Emi Tijani-Ajayi	Norway	20.70	q, PB
3	8	Gediminas Truskauskas	Lithuania	20.72	q
4	3	Erik Erlandsson	Sweden	20.89	q
5	2	Ebuka Nwokeji	Great Britain & N.I.	20.95	q
6	9	Deniz Kaan Kartal	Turkey	21.02	q
7	7	Darijo Bašić Palković	Serbia	21.17	
8	5	Karlo Marciuš	Croatia	21.24	
				Wind: (−0.6 m/s)	

==== Heat 2 ====
Place	Lane	Athlete	Nation	Time	Notes
1	2	Filippo Dezza	Italy	20.60	q
2	8	Oskars Grava	Latvia	20.69	q
3	3	Henri Sai	Estonia	20.73	q
4	9	Linus Pihl	Sweden	20.88	q
5	5	Marcus Lawler	Ireland	20.94	q
6	4	Gal Arad	Israel	21.02	
7	6	Kubilay Ençü	Turkey	21.06	
8	7	Vasilios Mirianthopoulos	Greece	21.17	
				Wind: (−0.4 m/s)	

==== Heat 3 ====
Place	Lane	Athlete	Nation	Time	Notes
1	9	Delvis Santos	Portugal	20.70	q
2	6	Eduardo Longobardi	Italy	20.91	q
3	4	Andreas Ofstad Kulseng	Norway	21.05	
4	7	Ondřej Macík	Czech Republic	21.22	
5	2	Sotirios Gkaragkanis	Greece	21.23	
6	3	Felix Svensson	Switzerland	21.33	
7	5	Ján Volko	Slovakia	21.45	
8	8	Oriol Sánchez	Spain	28.57	
				Wind: (−3.4 m/s)	

=== Semi-finals ===
The semi-finals were held on 13 August 2026, at 20:05 in the evening. First 2 in each heat (Q) and the next 2 fastest (q) advanced to the final.

==== Heat 1 ====
Place	Lane	Athlete	Nation	Time	Notes
1	8	Eseosa Fostine Desalu	Italy	20.08	Q
2	5	Oskars Grava	Latvia	20.27	Q
3	4	Joshua Hartmann	Germany	20.36	
4	6	Seán Aigboboh	Ireland	20.46	
5	7	Oğuz Uyar	Turkey	20.62	
6	3	Erik Erlandsson	Sweden	20.67	
7	2	Kenny Emi Tijani-Ajayi	Norway	20.74	
8	9	Gediminas Truskauskas	Lithuania	20.75	
				Wind: (+2.9 m/s)	

==== Heat 2 ====
Place	Lane	Athlete	Nation	Time	Notes
1	8	Zharnel Hughes	Great Britain & N.I.	20.05	Q
2	7	Timothé Mumenthaler	Switzerland	20.09	Q, PB
3	5	Delvis Santos	Portugal	20.23	Q, PB
4	4	Eduardo Longobardi	Italy	20.42	PB
5	9	Henrik Larsson	Sweden	20.48	
6	6	Kameron Horton	Germany	20.58	
7	2	Deniz Kaan Kartal	Turkey	20.84	
8	3	Marcus Lawler	Ireland	21.11	
				Wind: (+1.6 m/s)	

==== Heat 3 ====
Place	Lane	Athlete	Nation	Time	Notes
1	7	Owen Ansah	Germany	20.04	Q, =EL, PB
2	8	William Reais	Switzerland	20.35 [.342]	Q, SB
3	5	Filippo Dezza	Italy	20.35 [.349]	q, PB
4	9	Riku Illukka	Finland	20.38	NR
5	2	Linus Pihl	Sweden	20.79	
6	4	Ebuka Nwokeji	Great Britain & N.I.	20.83	
7	3	Henri Sai	Estonia	20.91	
—	6	Antoine Snyders	Belgium	DQ	TR17.2.3
				Wind: (+0.5 m/s)	

=== Final ===
The final was held on 14 August 2026, at 21:25 in the evening.

Place	Lane	Athlete	Nation	Time	Notes
1st place, gold medalist(s)	6	Owen Ansah	Germany	19.95	
2nd place, silver medalist(s)	7	Zharnel Hughes	Great Britain & N.I.	20.16	
3rd place, bronze medalist(s)	8	Eseosa Fostine Desalu	Italy	20.26 [.251]	
3rd place, bronze medalist(s)	4	Timothé Mumenthaler	Switzerland	20.26 [.251]	
5	9	Oskars Grava	Latvia	20.28	
6	2	Delvis Santos	Portugal	20.55	
7	3	Filippo Dezza	Italy	20.58	
8	5	William Reais	Switzerland	20.63	
				Wind: (+2.5 m/s)	
