= Latvia at the 2026 European Athletics Championships =

- Flag of Latvia
- WA code: LAT

in Birmingham, United Kingdom 10–16 August 2026
- Competitors: 7 (5 men and 2 women)
- Medals Ranked 25th: Gold 0 Silver 0 Bronze 1 Total 1

European Athletics Championships appearances
- 1934; 1938; 1946–1990; 1994; 1998; 2002; 2006; 2010; 2012; 2014; 2016; 2018; 2022; 2024; 2026

Other related appearances
- Soviet Union (1946–1990)

Latvia competed at the 2026 European Athletics Championships in Birmingham, United Kingdom from 10–16 August 2026.

== Medallists ==
| Medal | Name | Event | Date |
|---|---|---|---|
| Bronze | Patriks Gailums | Men's javelin throw | 15 August |

== Results ==
Latvia entered the following athletes.

Key

- Q = Qualified for the next round
- q = Qualified for the next round as a fastest loser or, in field events, by position without achieving the qualifying target
- NR = National record
- PB = Personal best
- SB = Season best
- N/A = Round not applicable for the event

Track and road events

| Athlete | Event | Heat | | Semifinal | | Final | |
| Athlete | Event | Result | Rank | Result | Rank | Result | Rank |
|---|---|---|---|---|---|---|---|
| Oskars Grava | Men's 200 m | 20.69 | 3 q | 20.27 | 2 Q | 20.28 | 5 |
| Raivo Saulgriezis | Men's marathon walk | —N/a | | | | 3:07:09 PB | 13 |
| Modra Liepiņa | Women's half marathon walk | —N/a | | | | 1:48:58 NR | 30 |

Field events

| Athlete | Event | Qualification | | Final | |
| Athlete | Event | Distance | Position | Distance | Position |
|---|---|---|---|---|---|
| Valters Kreišs | Men's pole vault | 5.45 | 17 | Did not advance | |
| Patriks Gailums | Men's javelin throw | 79.61 | 9 q | 82.97 | 3rd place, bronze medalist(s) |
| Krišjānis Suntažs | Men's javelin throw | DNS | | | |
| Anete Sietiņa | Women's javelin throw | 56.24 | 13 | Did not advance | |
