= Ebuka Nwokeji =

British sprinter (born 2006)

Personal information
- Born: 13 November 2006 (age 20)

Sport
- Sport: Athletics
- Event: Sprint

Achievements and titles
- Personal bests: 60m: 6.78 (2024); 100m: 10.43 (2023); 200m: 20.55 (2026); 400m: 45.82 (2026)
Medal record
Representing England
Commonwealth Youth Games
Silver medal – second place	2023 Trinbago	100 m

Ebuka Nwokeji (born 13 November 2006) is a British sprinter. He placed third over 200 metres at the 2026 UK Athletics Championships and made his senior debut for Great Britain at the 2026 European Championships.

== Early life ==
British born, Nwokeji has Nigerian heritage and attended primary and secondary school both in Nigeria and Britain. As a teenager he broke the Middlesex county U17 sprint record set by Ade Mafe and was also based in Upton, Northamptonshire.

== Career ==
On 17 June 2023, at the age of 16 years-old, he won silver at the British U20 National Championship. Later that year, he won the 100m and 200m titles at the British national U17 championships, setting a championship record in the 200 metres. He also a silver medal at the 2023 Commonwealth Youth Games in Trinidad and Tobago over 100 metres behind compatriot Teddy Wilson.

In July 2025, he was runner-up to Wilson and ahead of Jake Odey-Jordan in the UK Athletics U20 Championships. Nwokeji was subsequently a semi-finalist at the 2025 European Athletics U20 Championships in Tampere over 200 m the following month.

Later a member of Victoria Park Harriers & Tower Hamlets, he placed third overall in the 200 metres at the 2026 UK Athletics Championships behind Zharnel Hughes and Nethaneel Mitchell-Blake in 20.55 seconds on 21 June 2026. The following month, he won in 20.56 seconds ahead of Seán Aigboboh at the Cork City Sports in Ireland. In July 2026, he was selected to represent England at the 2026 Commonwealth Games in Glasgow. He was named for the 2026 European Athletics Championships in Birmingham for his senior British international debut at the age of 19 years-old. The youngest member of the Great Britain squad, he reached the semi-finals of the men's 200 metres.
