= Italy at the 2026 European Athletics Championships =

Italy team at athletics event

- WA code: ITA

in (United Kingdom) Birmingham 10 August 2026 – 16 August 2026
- Competitors: 132 (70 men, 62 women) in 50/50 events
- Medals Ranked 1st: Gold 10 Silver 6 Bronze 6 Total 22

European Athletics Championships appearances (overview)
- 1934; 1938; 1946; 1950; 1954; 1958; 1962; 1966; 1969; 1971; 1974; 1978; 1982; 1986; 1990; 1994; 1998; 2002; 2006; 2010; 2012; 2014; 2016; 2018; 2022; 2024; 2026

Italy competed at the 2026 European Athletics Championships in Birmingham, United Kingdom, from 10 to 16 August 2026.

Italy topped the medal table at the championships for the second consecutive edition, winning a total of 22 medals, including 10 gold, 6 silver, and 6 bronze. Italy also topped the placing table for the second consecutive edition, accumulating 226 points and securing 45 top-eight finishes throughout the championships.

== Stars of the team ==
The 2026 European Athletics Championships featured many of Italy's leading athletes, including Olympic, world and European champions. Among the biggest stars were sprinter and former Olympic champion Marcell Jacobs, distance runner Nadia Battocletti, high jumper Gianmarco Tamberi, triple jumper Andy Diaz, long jumper Larissa Iapichino, shot putter Leonardo Fabbri, and world indoor champion Zaynab Dosso. The championships also showcased several emerging talents who make their debut at the European Athletics Championships.

The Stars
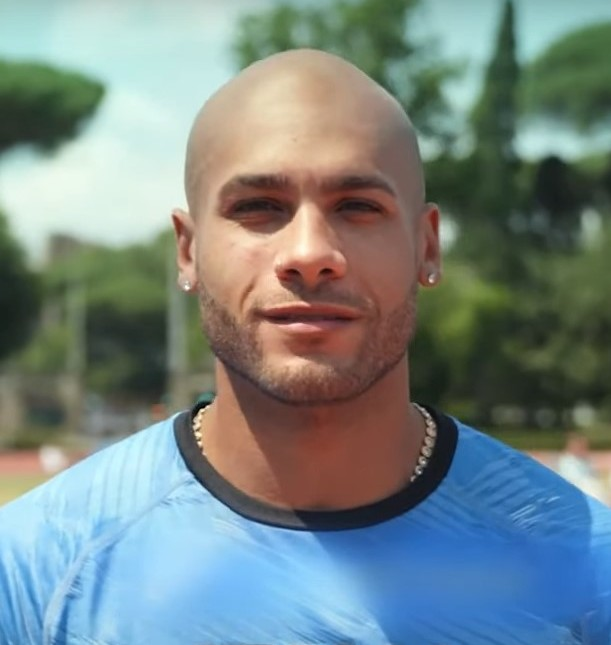
Marcell Jacobs

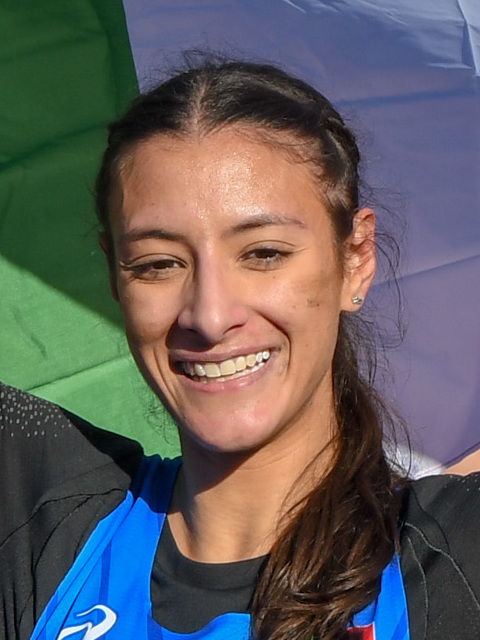
Nadia Battocletti

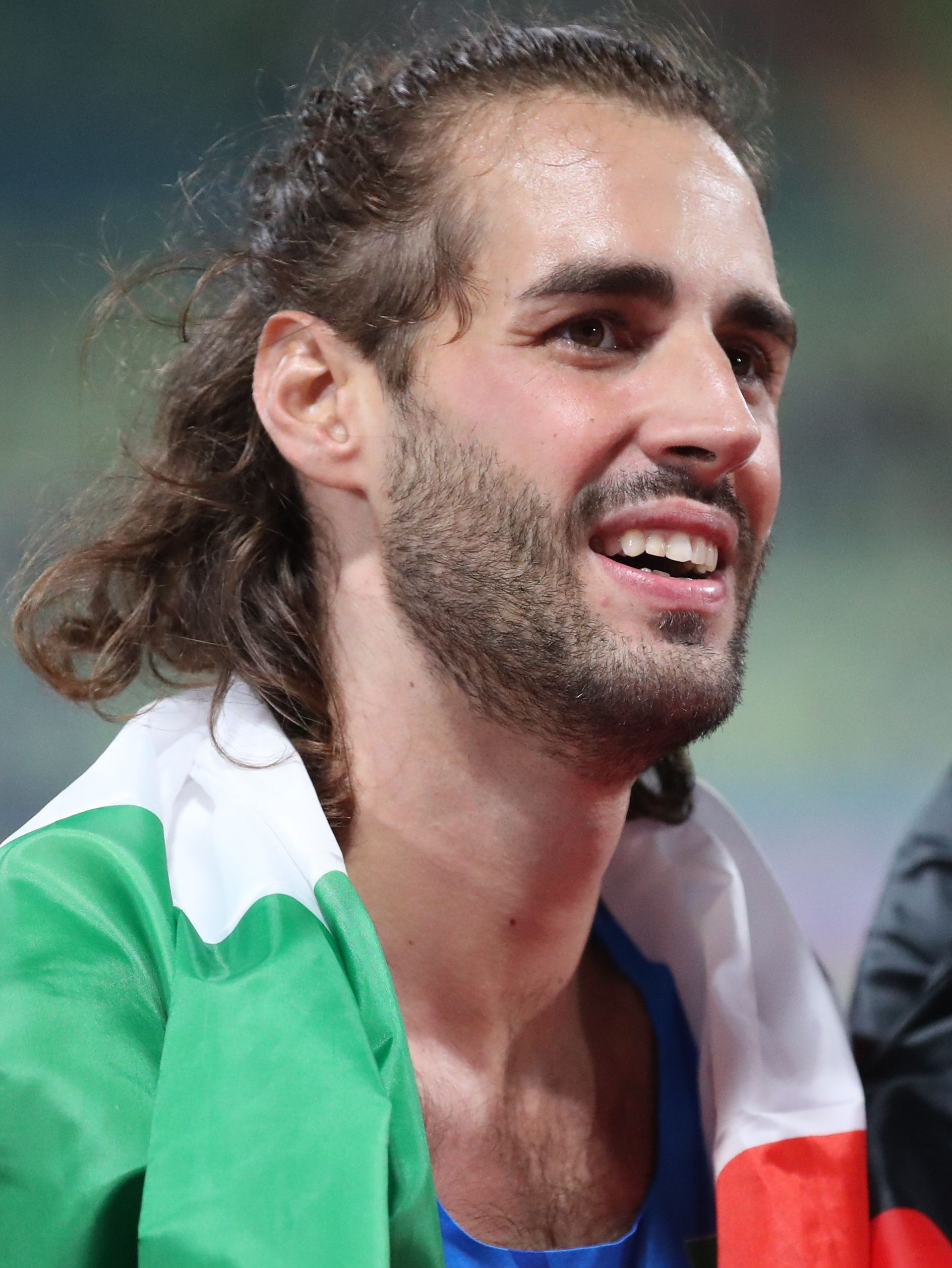
Gimbo Tamberi

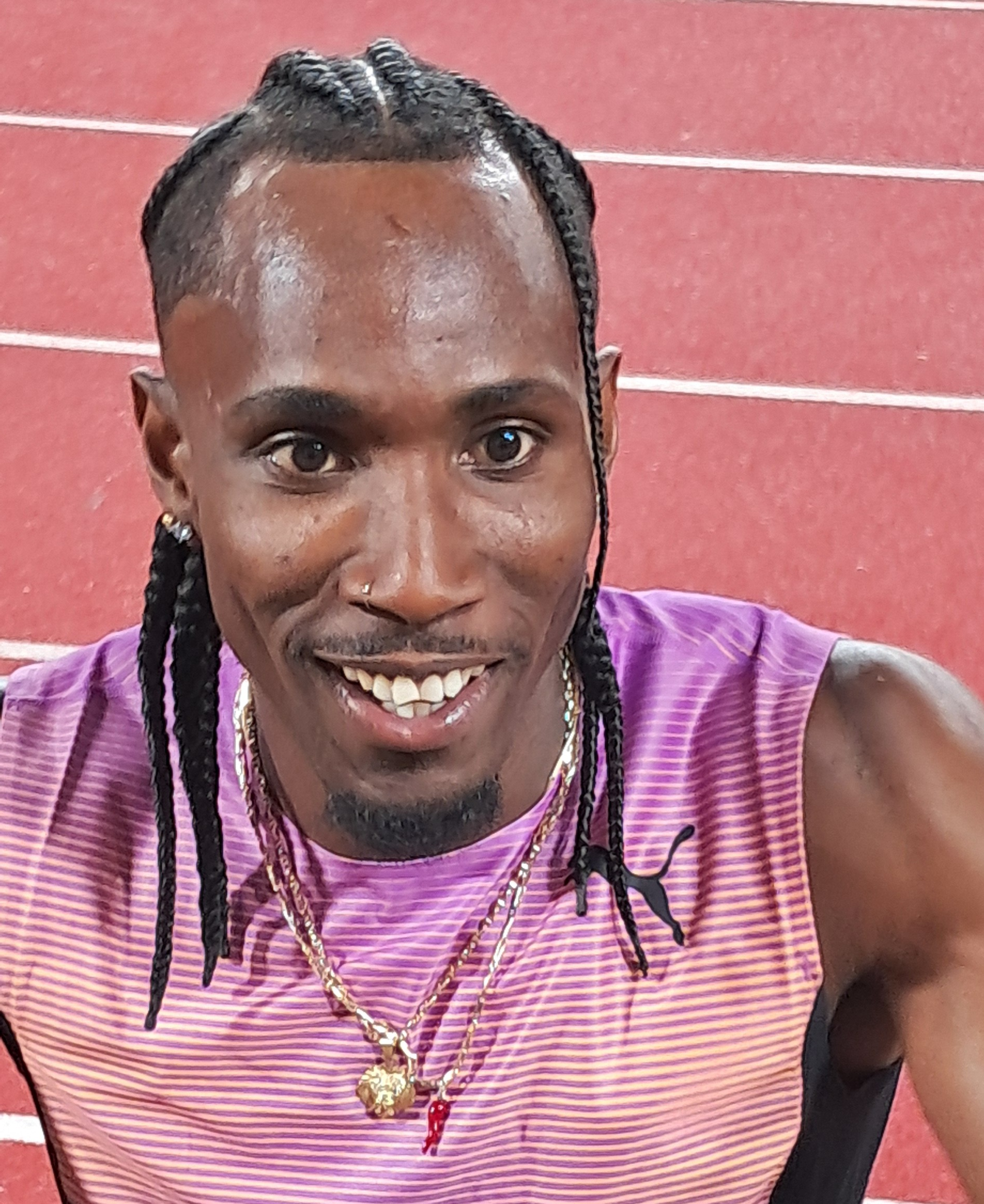
Andy Diaz

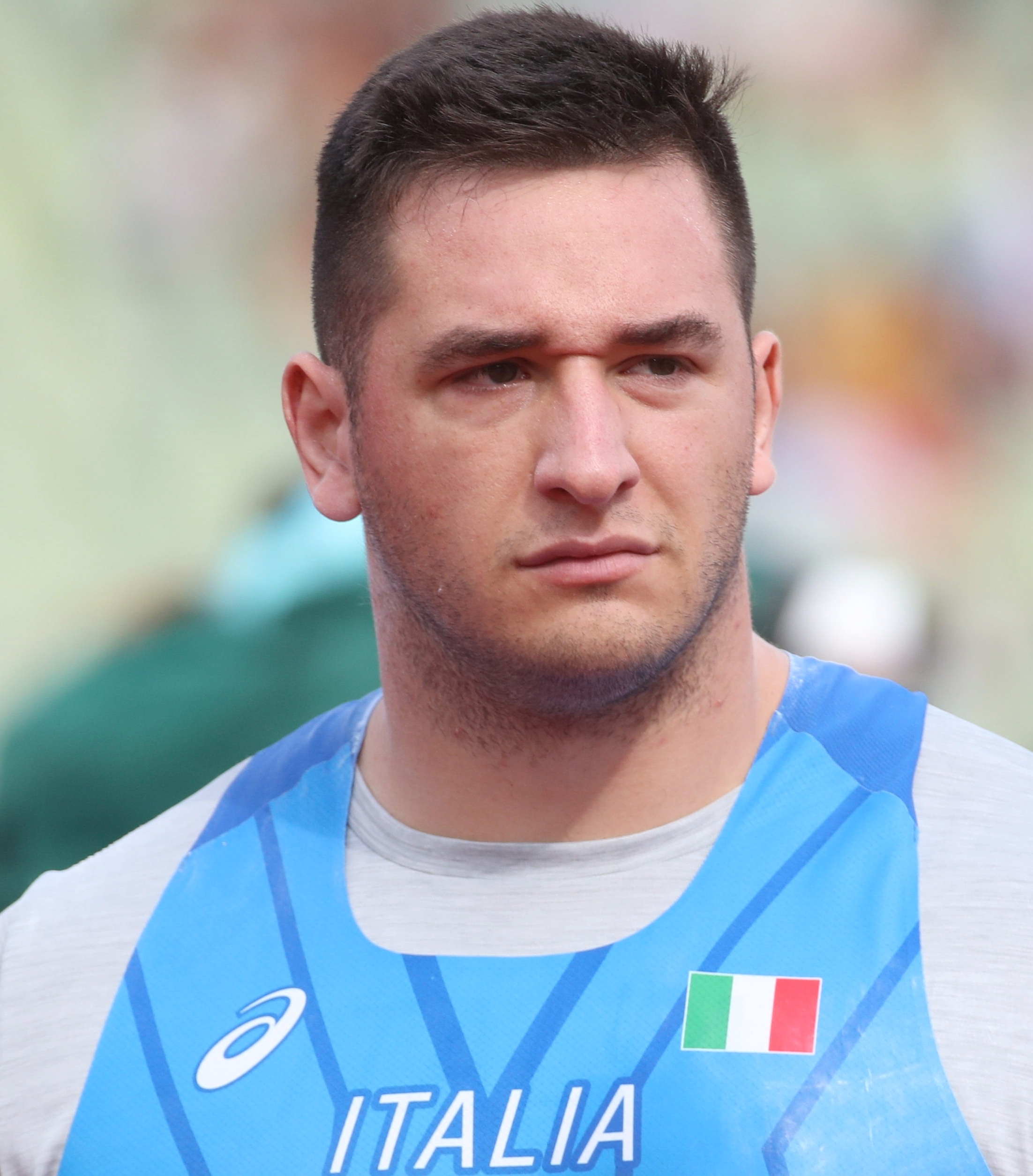
Leo Fabbri

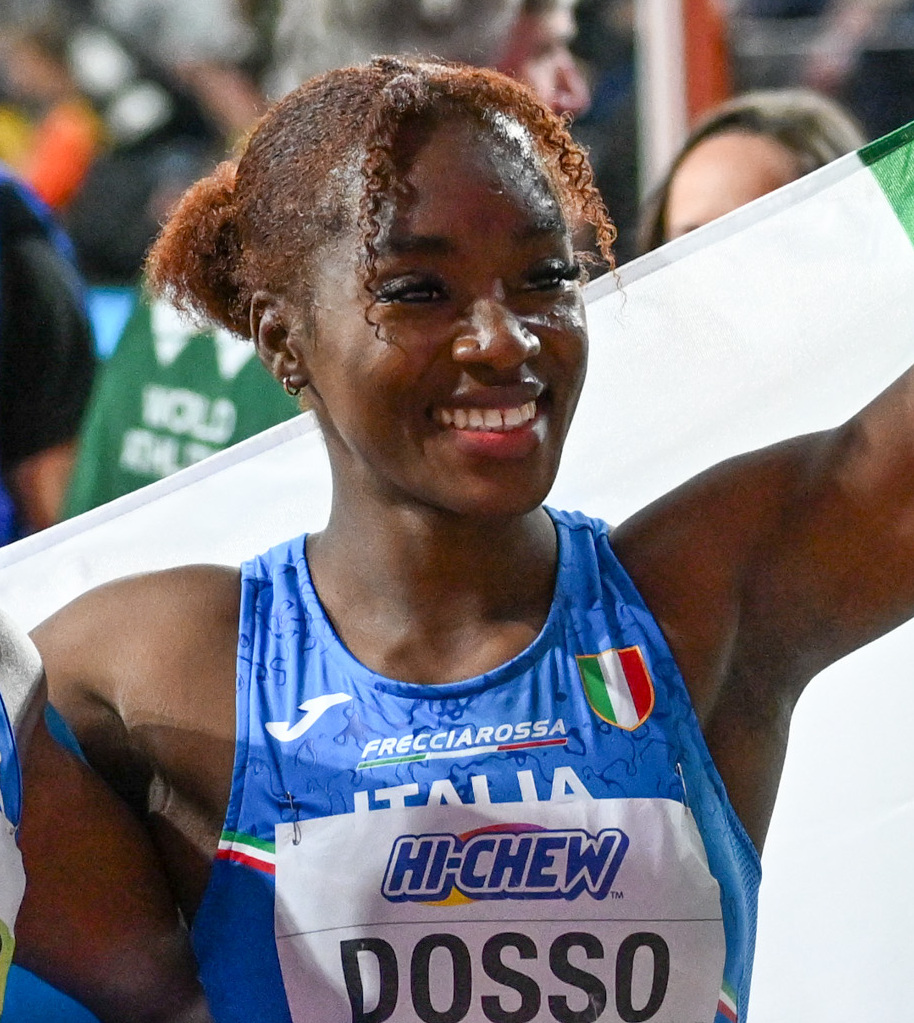
Zaynab Dosso

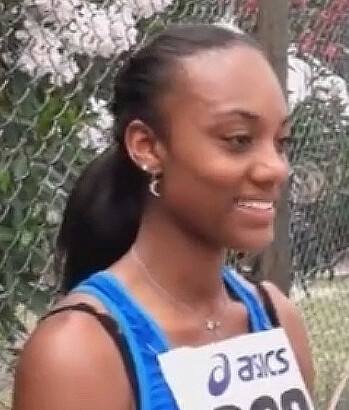
Larissa Iapichino

== Eleven gold medals to defend ==
Italy enters the 2026 European Athletics Championships as the defending champion nation after winning a record 11 gold medals at the 2024 European Athletics Championships in Rome. One of those titles, however, will not be defended, as reigning men's 110 metres hurdles champion Lorenzo Simonelli was not selected because of injury.

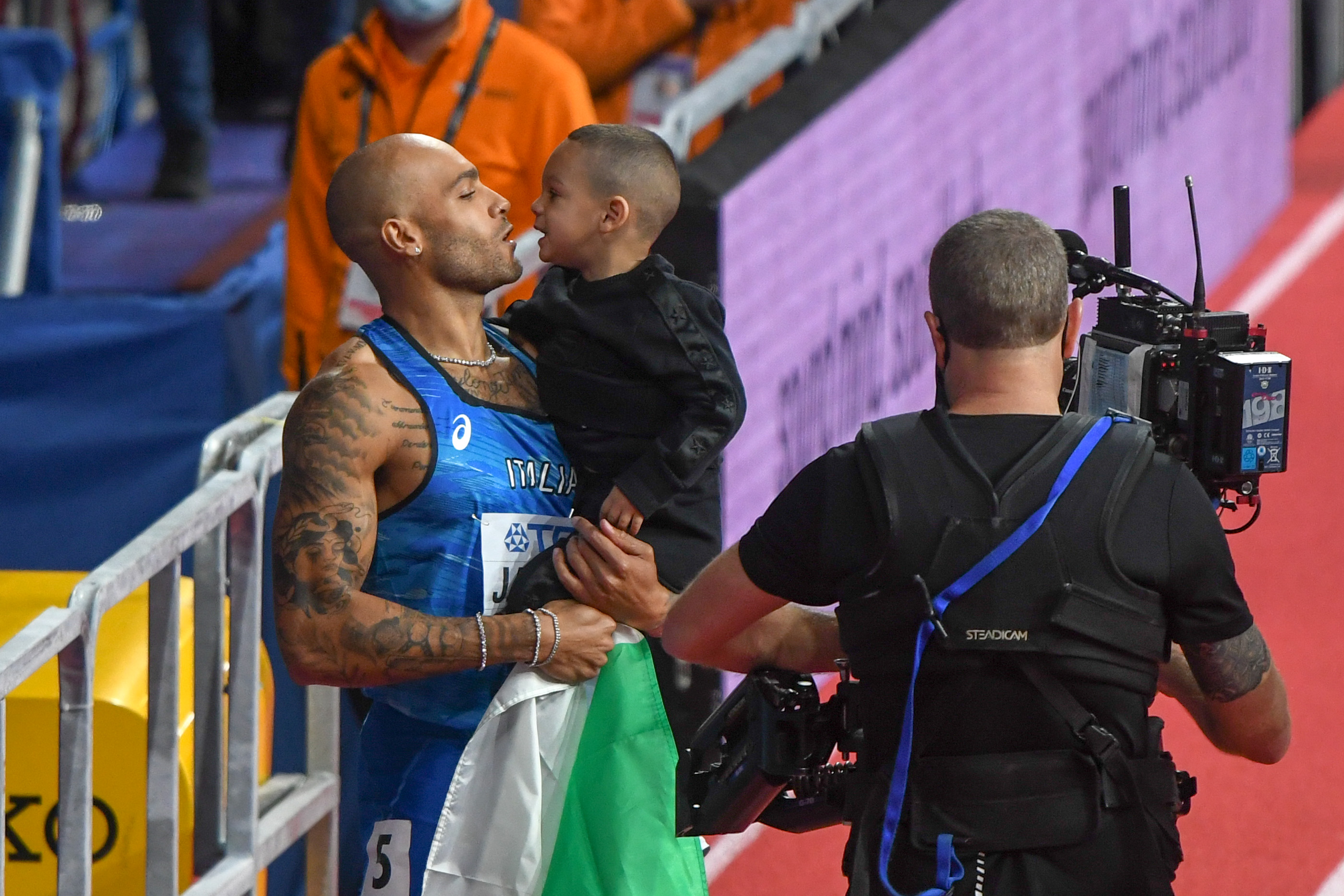
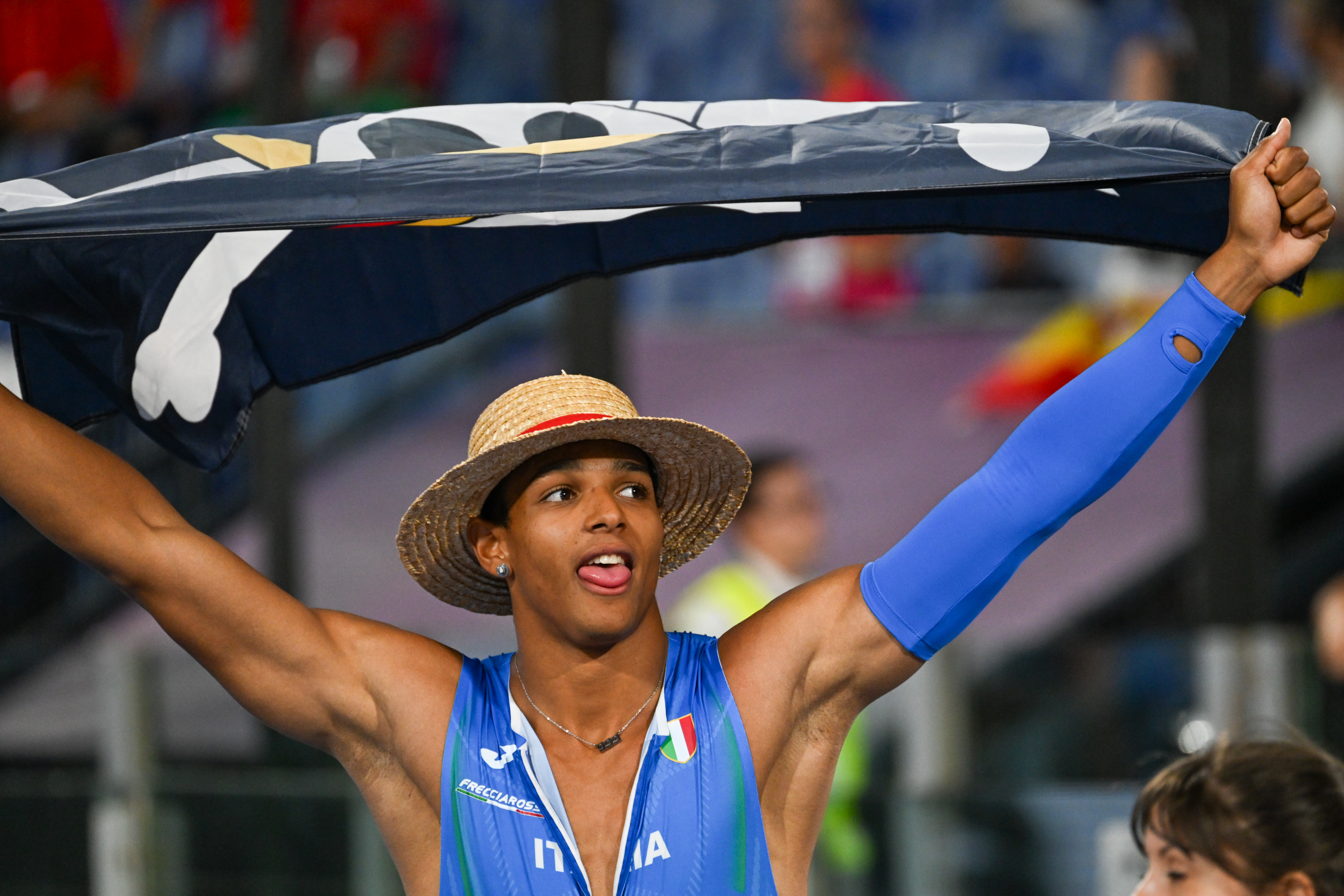
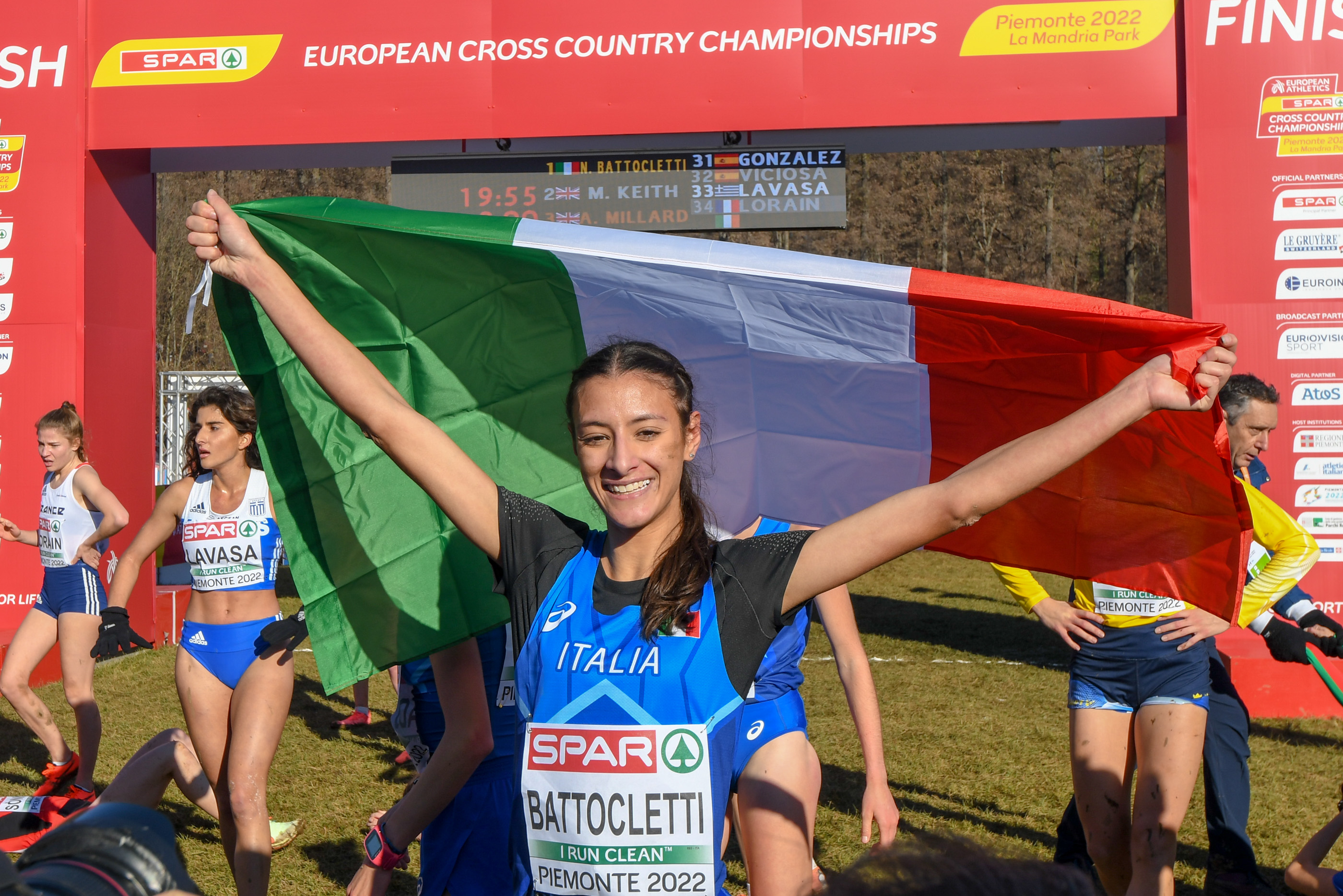
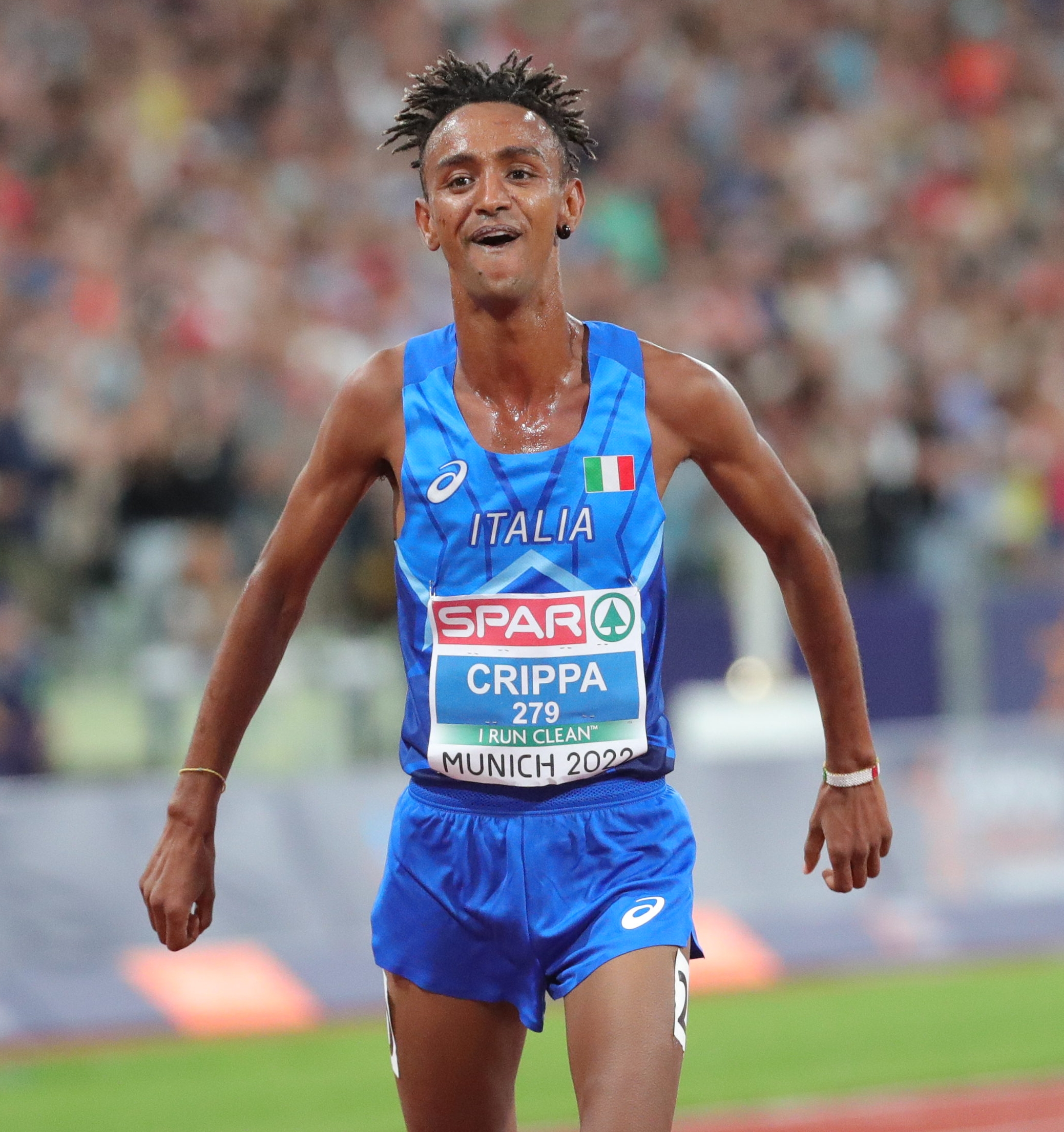
Jacobs, Simonelli, Battocletti and Crippa, all won golds for Italy team at Rome 2024.

Event	2024 champion(s)	Status
Women's 20 km walk	Antonella Palmisano	Defending champion
Women's 5000 metres	Nadia Battocletti	Defending champion
Men's 110 metres hurdles	Lorenzo Simonelli	Absent (injury)
Men's shot put	Leonardo Fabbri	Defending champion
Men's 100 metres	Marcell Jacobs	Defending champion
Men's half marathon	Yemaneberhan Crippa	Defending champion
Men's half marathon team	Yemaneberhan Crippa; Pietro Riva; Pasquale Selvarolo; Eyob Faniel; Yohanes Chiappinelli; Daniele Meucci	Three athletes selected
Women's hammer throw	Sara Fantini	Defending champion
Women's 10,000 metres	Nadia Battocletti	Defending champion
Men's high jump	Gianmarco Tamberi	Defending champion
Men's 4 × 100 metres relay	Matteo Melluzzo; Marcell Jacobs; Lorenzo Patta; Filippo Tortu	Defending champions

== Medallists ==
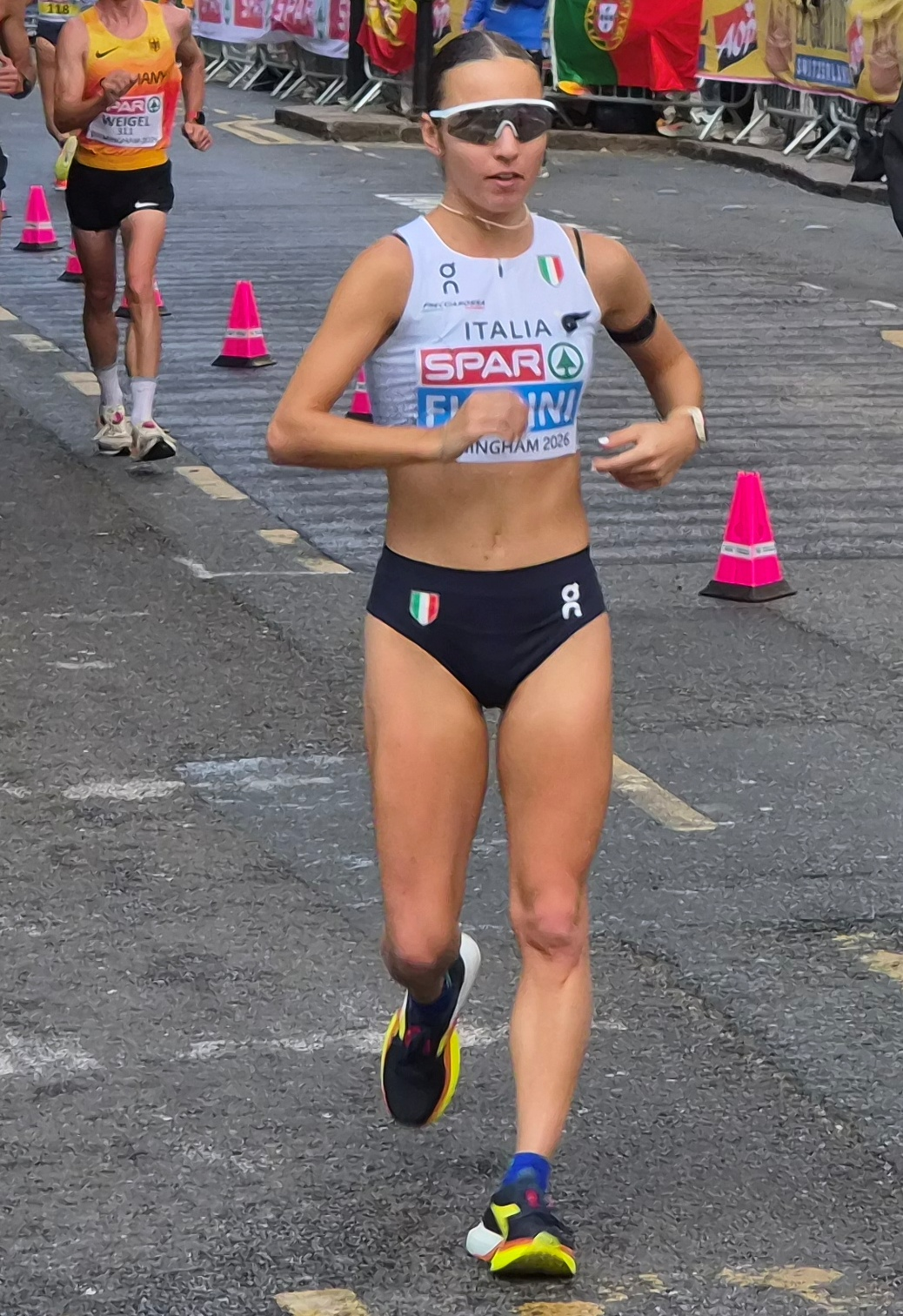
Sofia Fiorini gold medal and world record in the marathon race walk.

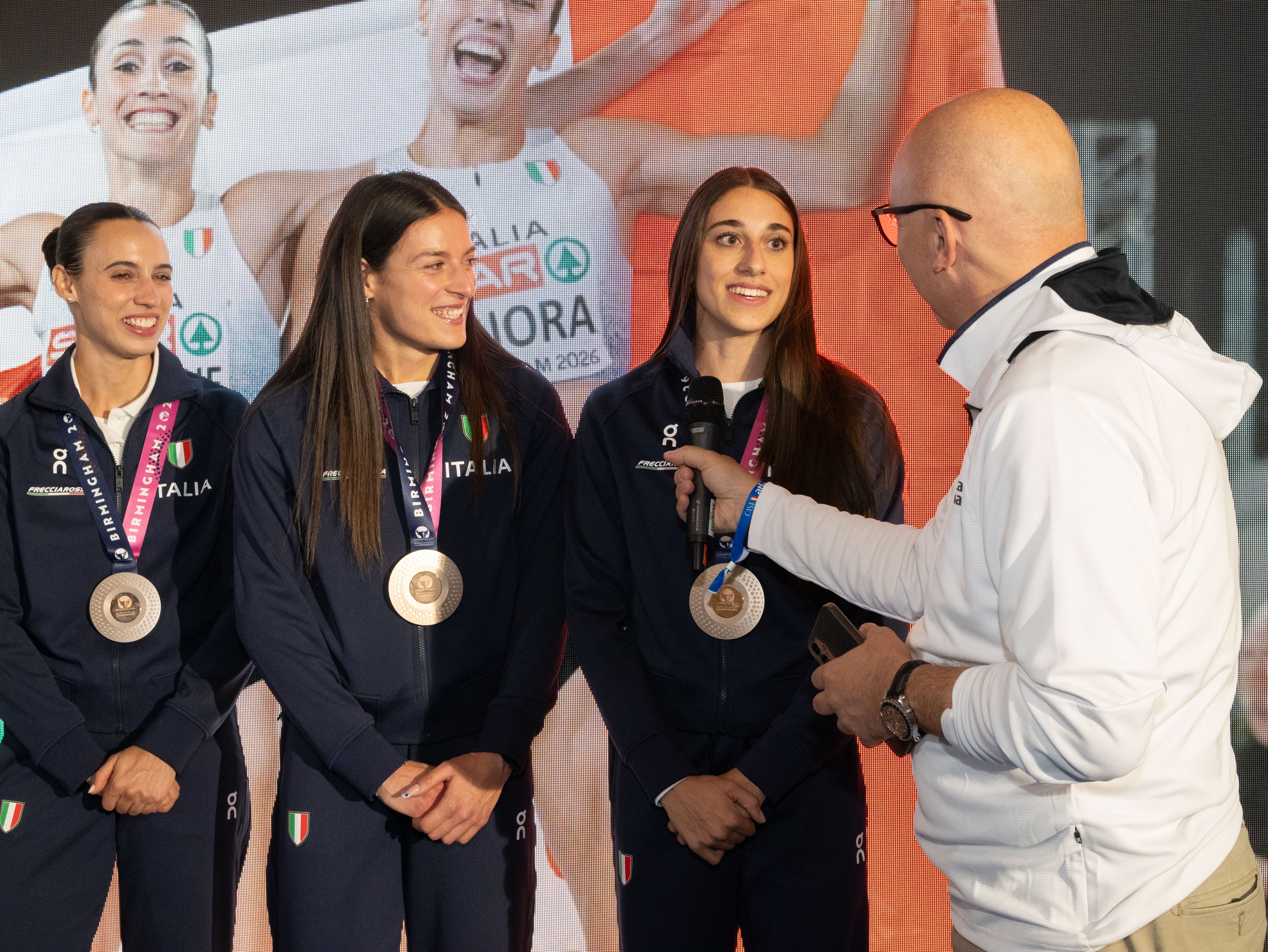
Alessandra Bonora, Ilaria Accame, Sara Cirillo celebrate the 4 × 400 m relay medal at Casa Atletica.

Medal	Athlete	Event	Result	Date
1st place, gold medalist(s)	Leonardo Fabbri	Men's shot put	22.31	10 August
1st place, gold medalist(s)	Nadia Battocletti	Women's 10,000 metres	31:41.17	14 August
1st place, gold medalist(s)	Gianmarco Tamberi	Men's high jump	2.32	14 August
1st place, gold medalist(s)	Andy Díaz	Men's triple jump	18.15	15 August
1st place, gold medalist(s)	Nadia Battocletti	Women's 5000 metres	15:37.84	11 August
1st place, gold medalist(s)	Dariya Derkach	Women's triple jump	14.60	13 August
1st place, gold medalist(s)	Massimo Stano	Men's marathon race walk	2.56:49	15 August
1st place, gold medalist(s)	Sofia Fiorini	Women's marathon race walk	3:15:11	15 August
1st place, gold medalist(s)	Larissa Iapichino	Women's long jump	7.00	16 August
1st place, gold medalist(s)	Edoardo Scotti; Lorenzo Benati; Luca Sito; Mohamed Soudassi	Men's 4 × 400 metres relay	2:59.16	16 August
2nd place, silver medalist(s)	Alexandrina Mihai	Women's half marathon race walk	1:31:04	15 August
2nd place, silver medalist(s)	Zane Weir	Men's shot put	21.12	10 August
2nd place, silver medalist(s)	Sara Fantini	Women's hammer throw	74.35	12 August
2nd place, silver medalist(s)	Pietro Riva	Men's marathon	2:09:18	16 August
2nd place, silver medalist(s)	Francesco Fortunato	Men's half marathon race walk	1:23:36	15 August
3rd place, bronze medalist(s)	Micol Majori	Women's 5000 metres	15:40.65	11 August
3rd place, bronze medalist(s)	Andrea Dallavalle	Men's triple jump	17.37	15 August
3rd place, bronze medalist(s)	Andrea Cosi	Men's half marathon race walk	1:23:49	15 August
3rd place, bronze medalist(s)	Matteo Sioli	Men's high jump	2.27	14 August
3rd place, bronze medalist(s)	Alice Mangione; Eloisa Coiro; Anna Polinari; Alessandra Bonora	Women's 4 × 400 metres relay	3:23.57	16 August
3rd place, bronze medalist(s)	Fausto Desalu	Men's 200 metres	20.26	14 August

== Team and results ==
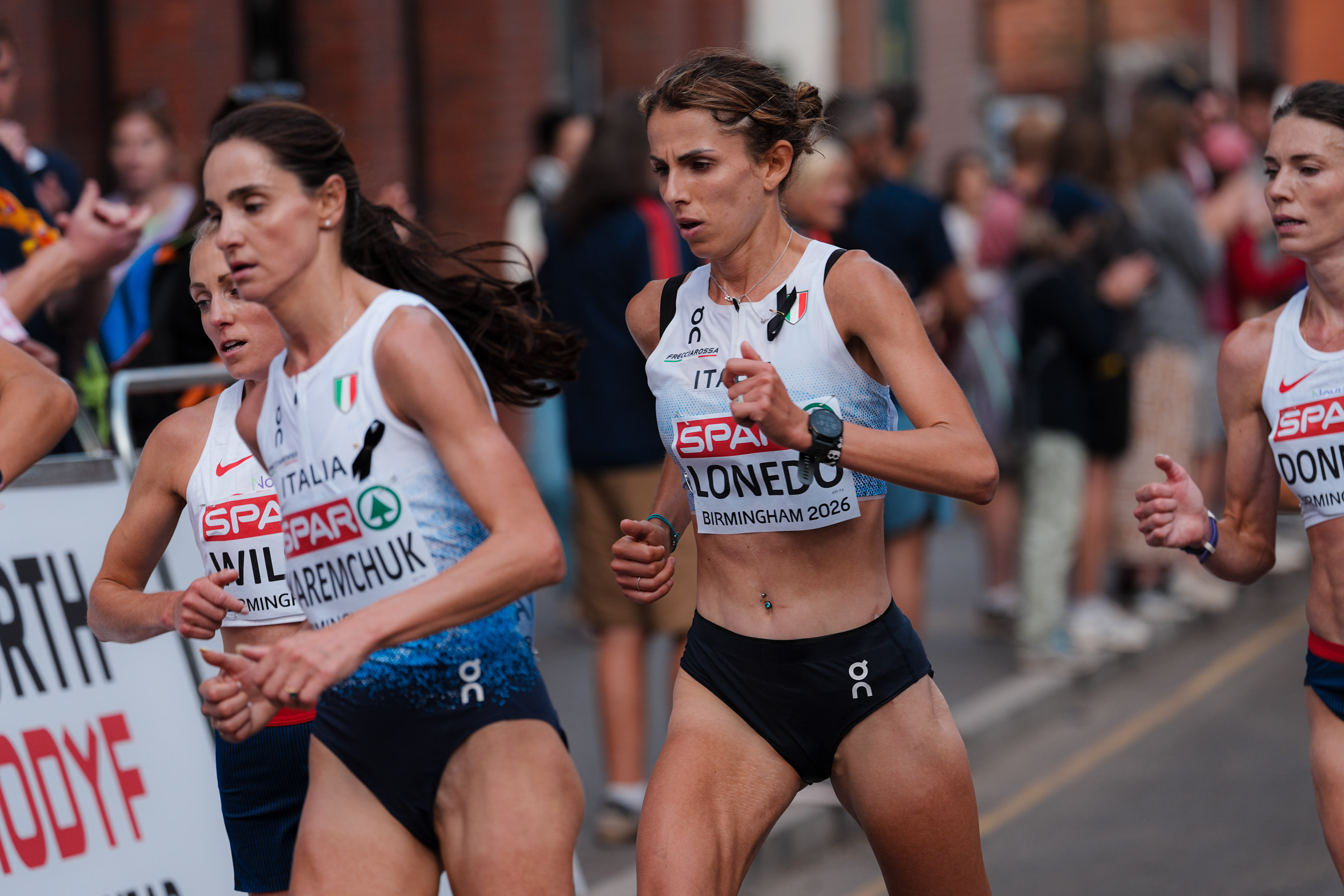
File:Yaremchuk and Lonedo 7th and 6th respectively in the women's marathon, both winners of the team silver medal.

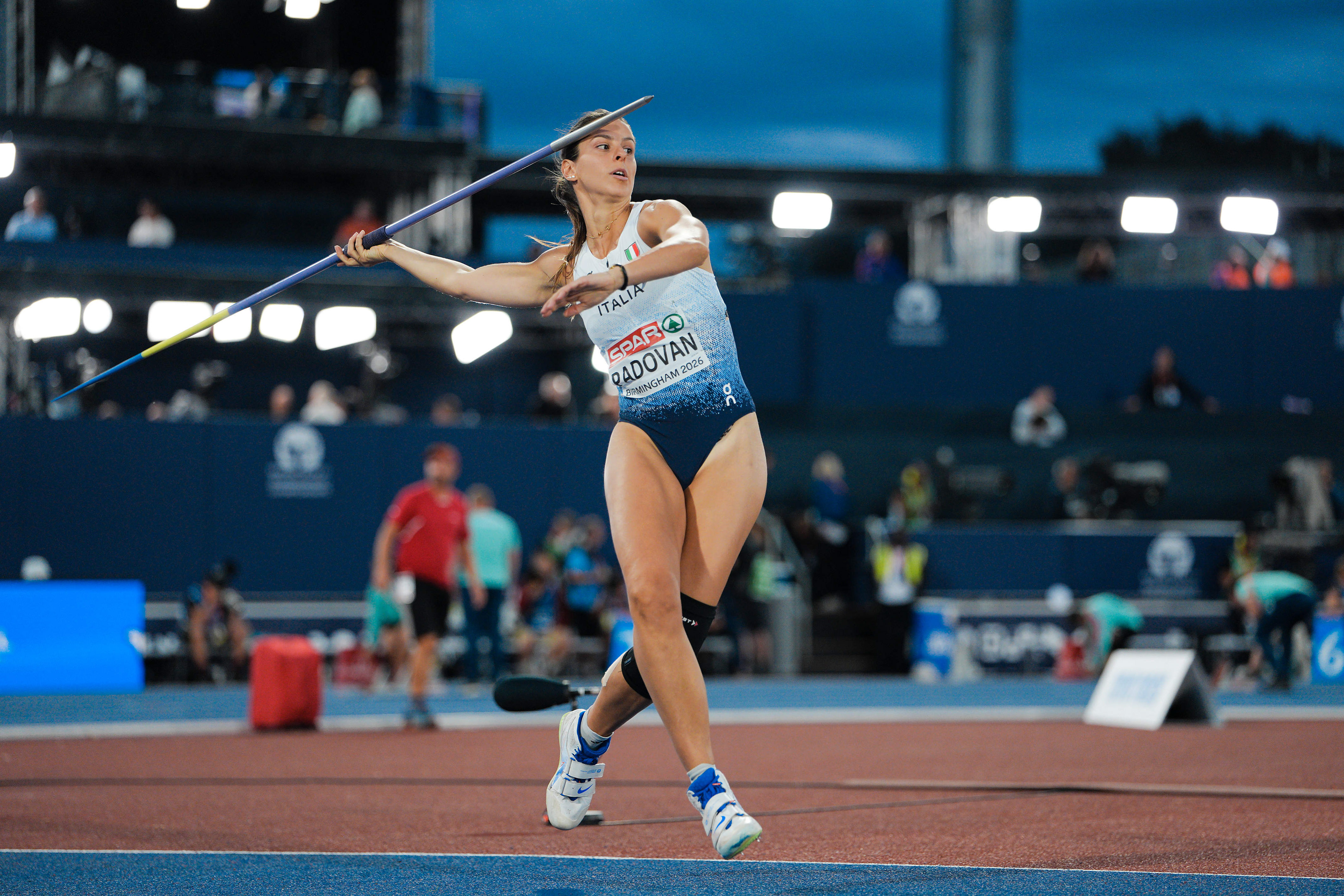
Paola Padovan, 7th in the javelin throw final with her personal best 58.91 m.

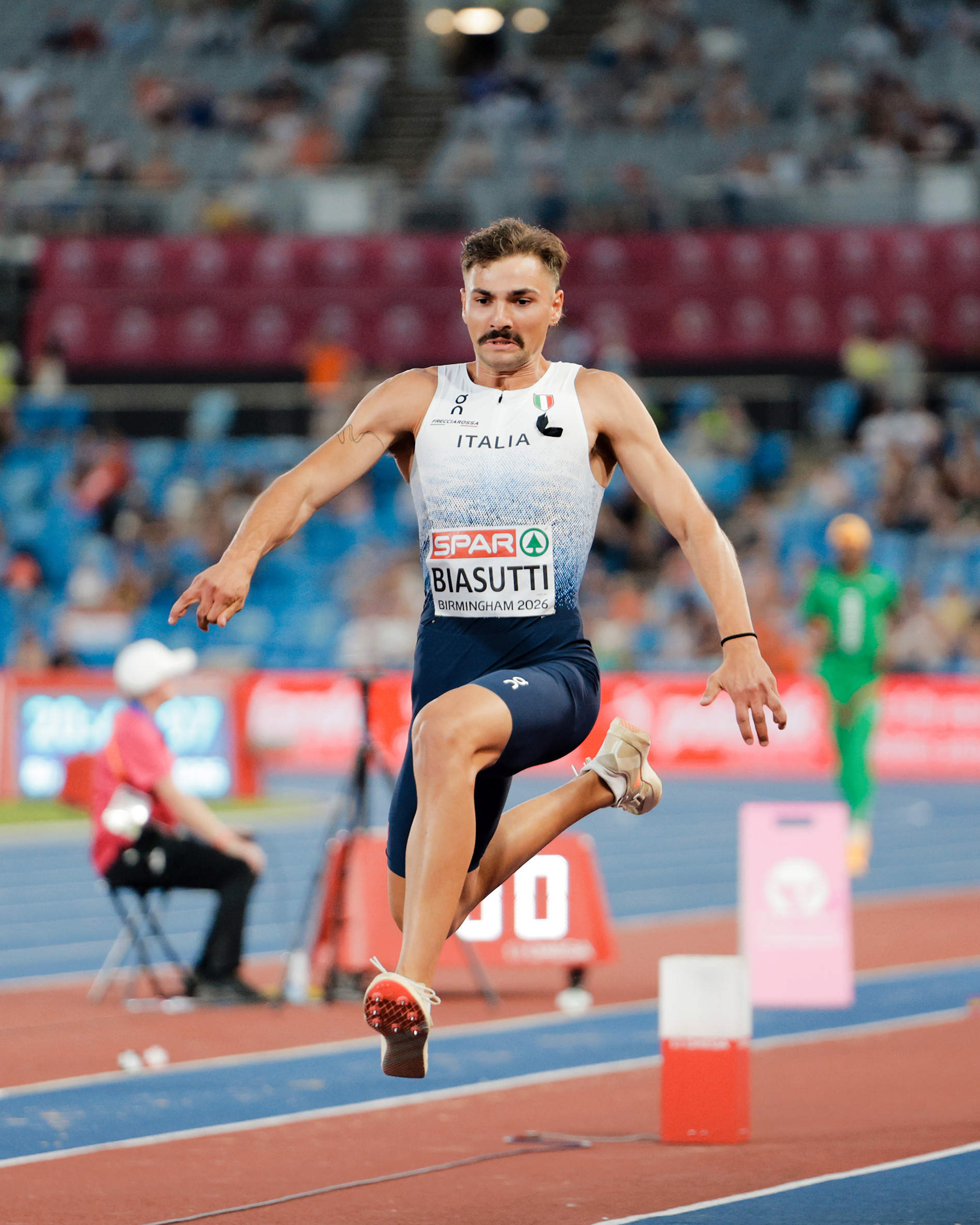
Simone Biasutti, who had brilliantly qualified for the triple jump final with the third measurement and the large Q, was injured in the final after the first jump.

On 30 July 2026, the technical commissioner of the Italian national team Antonio La Torre issued the list of the athletes called up for the Birmingham European Championships, 132 athletes (70 men and 32 women).

Legend

Athletes who defected before the start of the competition
Top eight

SF Athlete eliminated in SemiFinals
Qual Athlete eliminated in qualification

=== Men ===
Event	Athlete	Result
Sprint events
100 m	Chituru Ali	6
100 m	Marcell Jacobs	7
100 m	Samuele Ceccarelli	R1
100 m	Filippo Randazzo	R1
200 m	Fausto Desalu	3rd place, bronze medalist(s)
200 m	Filippo Dezza	7
200 m	Eduardo Longobardi	SF
400 m	Edoardo Scotti	SF
400 m	Lorenzo Benati	R1
400 m	Luca Sito	
400 m	Mohamed Soudassi	
4 × 100 m relay	Eric Marek	DNF
4 × 100 m relay	Fausto Desalu	DNF
4 × 100 m relay	Lorenzo Patta	DNF
4 × 100 m relay	Samuele Ceccarelli	DNF
4 × 100 m relay	Eduardo Longobardi	—
4 × 100 m relay	Chituru Ali	
4 × 100 m relay	Filippo Randazzo	
4 × 100 m relay	Filippo Dezza	
4 × 100 m relay	Roberto Rigali	
4 × 100 m relay	Filippo Tortu	
4 × 100 m relay	Marcell Jacobs	
4 × 400 m relay	Lorenzo Benati	1st place, gold medalist(s)
4 × 400 m relay	Edoardo Scotti	1st place, gold medalist(s)
4 × 400 m relay	Luca Sito	1st place, gold medalist(s)
4 × 400 m relay	Mohamed Soudassi	1st place, gold medalist(s)
4 × 400 m relay	Vanni Picco Akwannor	—
4 × 400 m relay	Riccardo Meli	—
4 × 400 m relay	Vladimir Aceti	—
4 × 400 m relay	Federico Falsetti	—
4 × 400 m relay	Matteo Raimondi	—
Middle and long-distance events
800 m	Francesco Pernici	5
800 m	Giovanni Lazzaro	SF
800 m	Catalin Tecuceanu	R1
1500 m	Pietro Arese	11
1500 m	João Bussotti	R1
5000 m	Francesco Guerra	16
5000 m	Konjoneh Maggi	19
5000 m	Sebastiano Parolini	20
10000 m	Yemaneberhan Crippa	4
10000 m	Pasquale Selvarolo	20
10000 m	Francesco Guerra	DNF
3000 m steeplechase	Osama Zoghlami	11
3000 m steeplechase	Ala Zoghlami	13
3000 m steeplechase	Yassin Bouih	16
Hurdles events
110 m hurdles	Oliver Mulas	R1
400 m hurdles	Alessandro Sibilio	8
400 m hurdles	Alessio Sommacal	SF
400 m hurdles	Giacomo Bertoncelli	SF
Field and combined events
High jump	Gianmarco Tamberi	1st place, gold medalist(s)
High jump	Matteo Sioli	3rd place, bronze medalist(s)
High jump	Christian Falocchi	8
High jump	Edoardo Stronati	13
Pole vault	Matteo Oliveri	13
Pole vault	Simone Bertelli	Qual
Long jump	Francesco Inzoli	6
Long jump	Mattia Furlani	Qual-
Triple jump	Andy Diaz	1st place, gold medalist(s)
Triple jump	Andrea Dallavalle	3rd place, bronze medalist(s)
Triple jump	Simone Biasutti	NM
Shot put	Leonardo Fabbri	1st place, gold medalist(s)
Shot put	Zane Weir	2nd place, silver medalist(s)
Shot put	Nick Ponzio	6
Shot put	Riccardo Ferrara	Qual
Discus throw	Alessio Mannucci	Qual
Discus throw	Carmelo Musci	Qual
Discus throw	Enrico Saccomano	Qual
Hammer throw	Giorgio Olivieri	Qual
Javelin throw	Giovanni Frattini	11
Javelin throw	Michele Fina	Qual
Decathlon	Dario Dester	11
Decathlon	Alberto Nonino	20
Road events
Marathon	Pietro Riva	2nd place, silver medalist(s)
Marathon	Ahmed Ouhda	18
Marathon	Daniele Meucci	23
Marathon	Xavier Chevrier	32
Marathon	Badr Jaafari	DNF
Half marathon racewalk	Andrea Cosi	3rd place, bronze medalist(s)
Half marathon racewalk	Francesco Fortunato	2nd place, silver medalist(s)
Half marathon racewalk	Gianluca Picchiottino	15
Marathon racewalk	Massimo Stano	1st place, gold medalist(s)
Marathon racewalk	Riccardo Orsoni	5
Marathon racewalk	Andrea Agrusti	DNF

=== Women ===
Event	Athlete	Result
Sprint events
100 m	Zaynab Dosso	7
100 m	Gloria Hooper	SF
200 m	Elena Cambiolo	SF
200 m	Vittoria Fontana	SF
200 m	Dalia Kaddari	SF
4 × 100 m relay	Zaynab Dosso	4
4 × 100 m relay	Gloria Hooper	4
4 × 100 m relay	Dalia Kaddari	4
4 × 100 m relay	Alessia Pavese	4
4 × 100 m relay	Alice Pagliarini	4
4 × 100 m relay	Vittoria Fontana	
4 × 100 m relay	Aurora Berton	
4 × 100 m relay	Rachele Torchio	
4 × 100 m relay	Elena Cambiolo	
400 m	Alessandra Bonora	SF
400 m	Alice Mangione	SF
400 m	Anna Polinari	SF
4 × 400 m relay	Alessandra Bonora	3rd place, bronze medalist(s)
4 × 400 m relay	Alice Mangione	3rd place, bronze medalist(s)
4 × 400 m relay	Anna Polinari	3rd place, bronze medalist(s)
4 × 400 m relay	Eloisa Coiro	3rd place, bronze medalist(s)
4 × 400 m relay	Ilaria Accame	3rd place, bronze medalist(s)
4 × 400 m relay	Sara Cirillo	3rd place, bronze medalist(s)
4 × 400 m relay	Rebecca Borga	—
4 × 400 m relay	Ginevra Ricci	—
4 × 400 m relay	Virginia Troiani	—
Middle and long-distance events
800 m	Eloisa Coiro	6
1500 m	Ludovica Cavalli	12
1500 m	Gaia Sabbatini	SF
1500 m	Marta Zenoni	DNS
5000 m	Nadia Battocletti	1st place, gold medalist(s)
5000 m	Micol Majori	3rd place, bronze medalist(s)
5000 m	Federica Del Buono	1
5000 m	Elisa Palmero	10
10000 m	Nadia Battocletti	1st place, gold medalist(s)
10000 m	Elisa Palmero	5
10000 m	Federica Del Buono	6
3000 m steeplechase	Gaia Colli	33
Hurdles events
100 m hurdles	Giada Carmassi	SF
100 m hurdles	Elena Carraro	SF
100 m hurdles	Celeste Polzonetti	SF
400 m hurdles	Ayomide Folorunso	5
400 m hurdles	Alice Muraro	SF
400 m hurdles	Rebecca Sartori	SF
Field and combined events
High jump	Asia Tavernini	7
High jump	Idea Pieroni	13
High jump	Marta Morara	Qual
Pole vault	Sonia Malavisi	Qual
Pole vault	Elisa Molinarolo	Qual
Pole vault	Virginia Scardanzan	Qual
Long jump	Larissa Iapichino	1st place, gold medalist(s)
Triple jump	Dariya Derkach	1st place, gold medalist(s)
Triple jump	Erika Saraceni	12
Shot put	Anna Musci	Qual
Shot put	Sara Verteramo	Qual
Discus throw	Benedetta Benedetti	Qual
Discus throw	Emily Conte	Qual
Discus throw	Daisy Osakue	Qual
Hammer throw	Sara Fantini	2nd place, silver medalist(s)
Hammer throw	Rachele Mori	Qual
Javelin throw	Paola Padovan	Qual
Heptathlon	Sveva Gerevini	9
Road events
Marathon	Rebecca Lonedo	6 (ind.); (silver) (team)
Marathon	Sofiia Yaremchuk	7 (ind.); (silver) (team)
Marathon	Giovanna Epis	21 (ind.); (silver) (team)
Marathon	Alessia Tuccitto	31 (ind.); (silver) (team)
Half marathon racewalk	Michelle Canto	16
Half marathon racewalk	Nicole Colombi	11
Half marathon racewalk	Alexandrina Mihai	2nd place, silver medalist(s)
Half marathon racewalk	Antonella Palmisano	5
Marathon racewalk	Federica Curiazzi	DNF
Marathon racewalk	Sofia Fiorini	1st place, gold medalist(s)
Marathon racewalk	Eleonora Giorgi	DNF

== Placing table ==
Italy won the placing table for the second edition in a row.

Rank	Nation	1st		2nd		3rd		4th		5th		6th		7th		8th		Total
Rank	Nation	Pl	Pts	Pl	Pts	Pl	Pts	Pl	Pts	Pl	Pts	Pl	Pts	Pl	Pts	Pl	Pts	Total
1	Italy	10	80	6	42	6	36	2	10	6	24	7	21	6	12	2	2	226

== See also ==
- Italy national athletics team
- 2026 Italian Athletics Championships
