= Switzerland at the 2026 European Athletics Championships =

- Flag of Switzerland
- WA code: SUI

in Birmingham, United Kingdom 10–16 August 2026
- Competitors: 69 (34 men and 35 women)
- Medals Ranked 6th: Gold 3 Silver 3 Bronze 1 Total 7

European Athletics Championships appearances
- 1934; 1938; 1946; 1950; 1954; 1958; 1962; 1966; 1969; 1971; 1974; 1978; 1982; 1986; 1990; 1994; 1998; 2002; 2006; 2010; 2012; 2014; 2016; 2018; 2022; 2024; 2026

Switzerland competed at the 2026 European Athletics Championships in Birmingham, United Kingdom from 10–16 August 2026.

== Medallists ==
Medal	Name	Event	Date
Gold	Jason Joseph	Men's 110 metres hurdles	12 August
Gold	Angelica Moser	Women's pole vault	13 August
Gold	Audrey Werro	Women's 800 metres	14 August
Silver	Simon Ehammer	Men's long jump	11 August
Silver	Dominic Lokinyomo Lobalu	Men's 10,000 metres	15 August
Silver	Géraldine Di Tizio-Frey; Fabienne Hoenke; Léonie Pointet; Salomé Kora; Ajla Del Ponte (heats)	Women's 4 × 100 metres relay	15 August
Bronze	Timothé Mumenthaler	Men's 200 metres	14 August

== Results ==
Switzerland entered the following athletes.

Key

- Q = Qualified for the next round
- q = Qualified for the next round as a fastest loser or, in field events, by position without achieving the qualifying target
- NR = National record
- PB = Personal best
- SB = Season best
- N/A = Round not applicable for the event

=== Men ===
Track and road events

Athlete	Event	Heat		Semifinal		Final	
Athlete	Event	Result	Rank	Result	Rank	Result	Rank
Timothé Mumenthaler	100 m	10.44	4 q	10.36	4	Did not advance	
Timothé Mumenthaler	200 m	Bye		20.09 PB	2 Q	20.26	3rd place, bronze medalist(s)
William Reais	200 m	Bye		20.35 SB	2 Q	20.63	8
Felix Svensson	200 m	21.33	22	Did not advance			
Haydn Brotschi	400 m	46.89	22	Did not advance			
Ricky Petrucciani	400 m	46.14	15	Did not advance			
Lionel Spitz	400 m	45.70	6 q	45.34 =SB	4	Did not advance	
Ivan Pelizza	800 m	1:49.42	8	Did not advance			
Ramon Wipfli	800 m	1:46.52	6	Did not advance			
Dominic Lokinyomo Lobalu	5000 m	—N/a				13:18.24	7
Dominic Lokinyomo Lobalu	10,000 m	—N/a				27:42.67 SB	2nd place, silver medalist(s)
Jonas Raess	10,000 m	—N/a				28:22.41 SB	8
Matthias Kyburz	Marathon	—N/a				2:11:42	17
Patrik Wägeli	Marathon	—N/a				2:18:38	36
Jason Joseph	110 m hurdles	Bye		13.38	1 Q	13.12 SB	1st place, gold medalist(s)
Fabio Küchler	110 m hurdles	14.00	13	Did not advance			
Julien Bonvin	400 m hurdles	50.49	17	Did not advance			
Dany Brand	400 m hurdles	49.07 SB	3 q	48.96 =PB	4	Did not advance	
Camilo Irarragorri	3000 m steeplechase	8:56.39	14	—N/a		Did not advance	
Aarno Liebl	3000 m steeplechase	8:42.01	9	—N/a		Did not advance	
Timothé Mumenthaler; Daryl Bachmann; Felix Svensson; Jason Joseph	4 × 100 m relay	39.18 SB	5	—N/a		Did not advance	
Dany Brand; Lionel Spitz; Ricky Petrucciani; Haydn Brotschi	4 × 400 m relay	3:01.31	5 q	—N/a		3:02.78	8

Field events

Athlete	Event	Qualification		Final	
Athlete	Event	Distance	Position	Distance	Position
Justin Fournier	Pole vault	5.45	18	Did not advance	
Simon Ehammer	Long jump	8.10	7 q	8.29	2nd place, silver medalist(s)
Jephté Vogel	Shot put	18.15	26	Did not advance	
Stefan Wieland	Shot put	18.61	23	Did not advance	
Franck di Sanza	Javelin throw	72.61	28	Did not advance	
Simon Wieland	Javelin throw	76.05	23	Did not advance	

Combined events – Decathlon

Athlete	Event	100 m	LJ	SP	HJ	400 m	110H	DT	PV	JT	1500 m	Final	Rank
Andrin Huber	Result	10.98	7.06 SB	14.62	1.96 SB	48.11 SB	14.29	43.39	4.60	60.11	4:20.61 SB	8137 SB	9
Andrin Huber	Points	865	828	766	767	904	937	734	790	739	807	8137 SB	9
Leon Krummenacher	Result	11.36	6.50	13.47	1.87	50.30 PB	14.87	43.34	5.00 =PB	56.63	4:29.89 PB	7603	19
Leon Krummenacher	Points	782	697	696	687	801	865	733	910	687	745	7603	19
Nino Portmann	Result	10.69	7.43	14.00	1.87	48.06 SB	14.45	41.13	4.40 =PB	56.26	4:36.82 SB	7888	14
Nino Portmann	Points	931	918	728	687	906	917	688	731	687	700	7888	14

=== Women ===
Track and road events

Athlete	Event	Heat		Semifinal		Final	
Athlete	Event	Result	Rank	Result	Rank	Result	Rank
Géraldine Di Tizio-Frey	100 m	Bye		11.02	1 Q	11.07	4
Nathacha Kouni	100 m	Bye		11.26	6	Did not advance	
Salomé Kora	100 m	11.19	7 q	11.12	4 q	11.51	8
Iris Caligiuri	200 m	23.39	13 q	23.34	8	Did not advance	
Fabienne Hoenke	200 m	Bye		22.46 PB	2 Q	22.55	4
Mujinga Kambundji	200 m	Bye		23.81	7	Did not advance	
Léonie Pointet	200 m	Bye		23.10	5	Did not advance	
Mélanie Roland	400 m	52.35	14	Did not advance			
Valentina Rosamilia	800 m	1:59.09	2 Q	1:59.14	3 Q	1:59.42	7
Veronica Vancardo	800 m	1:58.20 PB	4 q	1:58.16 PB	4 q	2:00.17	8
Audrey Werro	800 m	1:57.83	1 Q	2:35.35	8 qR	1:54.81 CR	1st place, gold medalist(s)
Lilly Nägeli	1500 m	4:19.28	15	—N/a		Did not advance	
Delia Sclabas	1500 m	4:09.09	7	—N/a		Did not advance	
Joceline Wind	1500 m	4:10.95	8	—N/a		Did not advance	
Andrea Meier	Marathon	—N/a				2:38:45	30
Fabienne Schlumpf	Marathon	—N/a				2:32:11	19
Samira Schnüriger	Marathon	—N/a				2:39:58 SB	33
Fabienne Vonlanthen	Marathon	—N/a				2:36:57 SB	26
Andrea Meier; Fabienne Schlumpf; Samira Schnüriger; Fabienne Vonlanthen	Marathon team	—N/a				7:47:53	6
Larissa Bertényi	100 m hurdles	13.01	11 q	13.32	7	Did not advance	
Ditaji Kambundji	100 m hurdles	Bye		12.94	2 Q	12.75	4
Selina von Jackowski	100 m hurdles	13.14	19	Did not advance			
Annina Fahr	400 m hurdles	57.99	23	Did not advance			
Yasmin Giger	400 m hurdles	56.57	14	Did not advance			
Lena Wernli	400 m hurdles	56.25	11 q	57.17	6	Did not advance	
Shirley Lang	3000 m steeplechase	9:45.01 PB	10	—N/a		Did not advance	
Géraldine Di Tizio-Frey; Fabienne Hoenke; Léonie Pointet; Salomé Kora; Ajla Del Ponte (heats)	4 × 100 m relay	42.38 SB	1 Q	—N/a		43.12	2nd place, silver medalist(s)
Mélanie Roland; Lena Wernli; Annina Fahr; Yasmin Giger	4 × 400 m relay	3:30.12 SB	6	—N/a		Did not advance	

Field events

Athlete	Event	Qualification		Final	
Athlete	Event	Distance	Position	Distance	Position
Lea Bachmann	Pole vault	4.25 SB	16	Did not advance	
Angelica Moser	Pole vault	4.50	3 q	4.80 =SB	1st place, gold medalist(s)
Miryam Mazenauer	Shot put	16.50	18	Did not advance	
Sabrina Boss	Javelin throw	55.22	17	Did not advance	
Leonie Hügli	Javelin throw	62.33 NR	1 Q	54.55	10

Combined events – Heptathlon

Athlete	Event	100H	HJ	SP	200 m	LJ	JT	800 m	Final	Rank
Annik Kälin	Result	12.59	1.71	13.59	23.54	6.81	44.39	2:12.87	6630	4
Annik Kälin	Points	1187	867	767	1025	1109	752	923	6630	4

=== Mixed ===
Track and road events

Athlete	Event	Final	
Athlete	Event	Result	Rank
Daryl Bachmann; Géraldine Di Tizio-Frey; William Reais; Fabienne Hoenke	Mixed 4 × 100 m	40.87 NR	4
