= Croatia at the 2026 European Athletics Championships =

- Flag of Croatia
- WA code: CRO

in Birmingham, United Kingdom 10–16 August 2026
- Competitors: 16 (7 men and 9 women)
- Medals: Gold 1 Silver 1 Bronze 0 Total 2

European Athletics Championships appearances
- 1994; 1998; 2002; 2006; 2010; 2012; 2014; 2016; 2018; 2022; 2024; 2026

Croatia competed at the 2026 European Athletics Championships in Birmingham, United Kingdom from 10–16 August 2026 with 16 competitors, 7 male and 9 female, winning two medals: javelin thrower Sara Kolak won gold, and runner Marino Bloudek silver in 800 m event.

== Medallists ==
Medal	Name	Event	Date
Gold	Sara Kolak	Women's javelin throw	16 August
Silver	Marino Bloudek	Men's 800 metres	13 August

== Results ==
Croatia entered the following athletes.

Key

- Q = Qualified for the next round
- q = Qualified for the next round as a fastest loser or, in field events, by position without achieving the qualifying target
- NR = National record
- PB = Personal best
- SB = Season best
- N/A = Round not applicable for the event

=== Men ===
Track and road events

Athlete	Event	Heat		Semifinal		Final	
Athlete	Event	Result	Rank	Result	Rank	Result	Rank
Karlo Marciuš	200 m	21.24	21	Did not advance			
Marino Bloudek	800 m	1:47.23	2 Q	1:44.96	2 Q	1:45.62	2nd place, silver medalist(s)
Bruno Belčić	3000 m steeplechase	9:00.76	16	—N/a		Did not advance	

Field events

Athlete	Event	Qualification		Final	
Athlete	Event	Distance	Position	Distance	Position
Ivan Geronimo Šerić	Pole vault	NM		Did not advance	
Marko Čeko	Long jump	7.39	26	Did not advance	
Filip Pravdica	Long jump	7.62	20	Did not advance	
Matija Gregurić	Hammer throw	73.49	15	Did not advance	

=== Women ===
Track and road events

Athlete	Event	Heat		Semifinal		Final	
Athlete	Event	Result	Rank	Result	Rank	Result	Rank
Veronika Drljačić	400 m	52.07	10 q	51.61 SB	7	Did not advance	
Nina Vuković	800 m	1:58.38 PB	3 Q	1:59.10	7	Did not advance	
Natalija Švenda	400 m hurdles	57.28	22	Did not advance			

Field events

Athlete	Event	Qualification		Final	
Athlete	Event	Distance	Position	Distance	Position
Paola Borović	Triple jump	13.23	24	Did not advance	
Magdalena Perić	Triple jump	13.44	23	Did not advance	
Marija Tolj	Discus throw	59.85	9 q	63.08	6
Vita Barbić	Javelin throw	53.52	26	Did not advance	
Sara Kolak	Javelin throw	60.82	3 q	Gold	62.43

Combined events – Heptathlon

Athlete	Event	100H	HJ	SP	200 m	LJ	JT	800 m	Final	Rank
Jana Koščak	Result	14.30 SB	1.83 SB	12.21 SB	DNF					
Jana Koščak	Points	936	1016	675	DNF					
