= 2026 European Athletics Championships – Men's marathon race walk =

Men's marathon race walk at the 2026 European Athletics Championships
- Venue: Alexander Stadium
- Location: Birmingham, United Kingdom
- Dates: 15 August 2026
- Winning time: 2:56:49 AR, WL

Medalists
gold medal	Massimo Stano	Italy
silver medal	Miguel Ángel López	Spain
bronze medal	Aurélien Quinion	France

The men's marathon race walk at the 2026 European Athletics Championships took place in Birmingham, United Kingdom, on 15 August 2026.

== Background ==
Records before the 2026 European Athletics Championships
Record	Athlete (nation)	Time	Location	Date
World record	Hayako Katsuki (JPN)	2:55:28	Takahata, Japan	26 October 2025
World leading	Motofumi Suwa (JPN)	2:58:21	Nomi, Japan	15 March 2026
Championship record	New event			
European record	Alex Schwazer (ITA)	3:01:55	Kelsterbach, Germany	26 April 2026
European leading	Alex Schwazer (ITA)	3:01:55	Kelsterbach, Germany	26 April 2026

== Qualification ==
The qualification period was from 27 January 2025 to 26 July 2026. Athletes qualified by the entry standard of 3:11:00 m or faster in marathon race walk, by the entry standard of 2:33:00 in 35 km walk, by wildcard for the 2022 European Athletics Championor (in 2024 the event was not run), or by their position on the World Athletics Rankings for the event. The target number was 35 athletes. Eventually 32 athletes qualified.

Qualification standings per 31 July 2026
QP	CP	Country	Athlete	Status	Details
1	1	Spain	Miguel Ángel López	Qualified by Wild Card	Defending European Champion
2	1	Hungary	Bence Venyercsán	Qualified by Entry Standard	3:03:45 - Dudince (SVK) - 07 MAR 2026
3	1	Italy	Andrea Agrusti	Qualified by Entry Standard	3:03:55 - Weinauparkstadion, Zittau (GER) - 25 OCT 2025
4	1	Germany	Karl Junghannß	Qualified by Entry Standard	3:04:33 - Dudince (SVK) - 07 MAR 2026
5	1	Ukraine	Serhii Svitlychnyi	Qualified by Entry Standard	3:04:49 - Ivano-Frankivsk (UKR) - 18 OCT 2025
6	1	Sweden	Perseus Karlström	Qualified by Entry Standard	3:04:50 - Trolley Square, Santee, CA (USA) - 11 JAN 2026
7	2	Ukraine	Maryan Zakalnytskyy	Qualified by Entry Standard	3:05:14 - Ivano-Frankivsk (UKR) - 18 OCT 2025
8	1	France	Martin Madeline-Degy	Qualified by Entry Standard	3:05:34 - Salaise-sur-Sanne (FRA) - 16 NOV 2025
9	2	Germany	Christopher Linke	Qualified by Entry Standard	3:05:44 - Dudince (SVK) - 07 MAR 2026
10	2	Hungary	Máté Helebrandt	Qualified by Entry Standard	3:07:26 - Weinauparkstadion, Zittau (GER) - 25 OCT 2025
11	2	Italy	Massimo Stano	Qualified by Entry Standard	3:07:38 - Brasilia (BRA) - 12 APR 2026
12	2	France	Aurélien Quinion	Qualified by Entry Standard	3:07:53 - Brasilia (BRA) - 12 APR 2026
13	3	Italy	Riccardo Orsoni	Qualified by Entry Standard	3:08:09 - Brasilia (BRA) - 12 APR 2026
14	1	Czech Republic	Jaromír Morávek	Qualified by Entry Standard	3:08:10 - Weinauparkstadion, Zittau (GER) - 25 OCT 2025
reserve	4	Italy	Teodorico Caporaso	Qualified by Entry Standard	3:08:30 - Stromlo Forest Park, Canberra (AUS) - 07 JUN 2026
15	2	Spain	Óscar Martínez	Qualified by Entry Standard	3:09:08 - Dudince (SVK) - 07 MAR 2026
16	1	Latvia	Raivo Saulgriezis	Qualified by Entry Standard	3:09:31 - Weinauparkstadion, Zittau (GER) - 25 OCT 2025
17	3	Ukraine	Ivan Banzeruk	Qualified by Entry Standard	3:09:50 - Ivano-Frankivsk (UKR) - 18 OCT 2025
18	3	Spain	José Manuel Pérez	Qualified by Entry Standard	3:09:52 - Dudince (SVK) - 07 MAR 2026
19	3	Germany	Carl Dohmann	Qualified by Entry Standard	3:09:55 - Weinauparkstadion, Zittau (GER) - 25 OCT 2025
reserve	4	Germany	Johannes Frenzl	Qualified by Entry Standard	3:10:09 - Dudince (SVK) - 07 MAR 2026
20	3	Hungary	Norbert Tóth	Qualified by Entry Standard	3:10:25 - Dudince (SVK) - 07 MAR 2026
21	1	Slovakia	Dominik Černý	Qualified by Entry Standard	2:26:31 - Dudince (SVK) - 22 MAR 2025
reserve	5	Italy	Matteo Giupponi	Qualified by Entry Standard	2:27:18 - Dudince (SVK) - 22 MAR 2025
22	4	Spain	Daniel Chamosa	Qualified by Entry Standard	2:27:56 - Lázeňský Park, Poděbrady (CZE) - 18 MAY 2025
reserve	5	Spain	Manuel Bermúdez	Qualified by Entry Standard	2:28:43 - Lázeňský Park, Poděbrady (CZE) - 18 MAY 2025
23	1	Ireland	Oisin Lane	Qualified by Entry Standard	2:31:53 - Marín (ESP) - 09 MAR 2025
24	2	Slovakia	Michal Morvay	Qualified by Entry Standard	2:33:00 - Dudince (SVK) - 22 MAR 2025
25	1	Great Britain & N.I.	Cameron Corbishley	Qualified by World Rankings	33rd - 1122 points
26	1	Greece	Alexandros Papamichail	Qualified by World Rankings	39th - 1093 points
27	1	Turkey	Ozan Bayram	Qualified by World Rankings	40th - 1091 points
28	2	Turkey	Salih Korkmaz	Qualified by World Rankings	41st - 1086 points
29	3	Turkey	Harun Bilir	Qualified by World Rankings	46th - 1058 points
30	3	Slovakia	Michal Duda	Qualified by World Rankings	48th - 1032 points
31	2	Greece	Georgios Kelepouris	Qualified by World Rankings	50th - 1019 points
32	3	Greece	Andreas Karagiannis	Qualified by World Rankings	55th - 822 points

== Schedule ==
Date	Time	Round
15 August 2026	7:30	Final

All times are local times (UTC+1)

== Results ==
Key:	~ Red card for loss of contact	> Red card for bent knee

Place	Athlete	Nation	Time	Red cards	Notes
1st place, gold medalist(s)	Massimo Stano	Italy	2:56:49		AR, WL
2nd place, silver medalist(s)	Miguel Ángel López	Spain	2:56:57		PB
3rd place, bronze medalist(s)	Aurélien Quinion	France	2:59:29	~ ~	PB
4	Perseus Karlström	Sweden	3:00:18		NR
5	Riccardo Orsoni	Italy	3:00:44		PB
6	Bence Venyercsán	Hungary	3:01:18	> ~ ~	NR
7	Daniel Chamosa	Spain	3:02:32		PB
8	Christopher Linke	Germany	3:02:58		PB
9	José Manuel Pérez Rubio	Spain	3:03:50		PB
10	Maryan Zakalnytskyy	Ukraine	3:04:38		NR
11	Norbert Tóth	Hungary	3:05:43		PB
12	Serhii Svitlychnyi	Ukraine	3:05:56	~	SB
13	Raivo Saulgriezis	Latvia	3:07:09		PB
14	Martin Madeline-Degy	France	3:08:12	> ~ ~	SB
15	Johannes Frenzl	Germany	3:09:12		PB
16	Máté Helebrandt	Hungary	3:09:22	~	SB
17	Manuel Bermúdez Jiménez	Spain	3:10:38		PB
18	Michal Morvay	Slovakia	3:11:00	>	PB
19	Cam Corbishley	Great Britain & N.I.	3:13:31	~ ~	PB
20	Jaromír Morávek	Czech Republic	3:16:36	~ ~	SB
21	Alexandros Papamichail	Greece	3:18:25		NR
22	Ivan Banzeruk	Ukraine	3:18:30	>	SB
23	Michal Duda	Slovakia	3:20:04		PB
24	Dominik Černý	Slovakia	3:20:40		
25	Ozan Bayram	Turkey	3:21:39	> ~ >	
26	Georgios Kelepouris	Greece	3:24:37		PB
27	Andreas Karagiannis	Greece	3:44:32		PB
—	Andrea Agrusti	Italy	DNF		
—	Harun Bilir	Turkey	DNF	~	
