= Seán Aigboboh =

Irish sprinter (born 2005)

Personal information
- Nationality: Irish
- Born: 22 October 2005 (age 21)

Sport
- Sport: Athletics
- Event: Sprint
- College team: (United States) Houston Cougars
- Club: Tallaght AC
- Coached by: Carl Lewis

Seán Aigboboh (born 22 October 2005) is an Irish-Nigerian sprinter. In 2026, he set an Irish national record of 20.27 seconds for the 200 metres. The previous year, he was part of an Irish national record setting men's 4 x 100 metres relay team.

== Biography ==
A Tallaght Athletics Club member he was coached by Daniel Kilgallon. In June 2023 while representing The High School, Dublin, Aigboboh won the senior 100 metres title at the All-Ireland Schools Championships in Tullamore, setting a new personal best time of 10.67 to win the title.

In February 2024, Aigboboh placed third overall with a new personal best time of 6.77 in the 60 metres final at the Irish Indoor Championships. That summer, Aigboboh also finishes third with a new personal best time of 10.39 seconds for the 100 metres at the senior Irish Championships at the age of 18 years-old. Aigboboh competed for Ireland at the 2024 World Athletics U20 Championships in Lima, Peru, and was a finalist with the men's 4 × 100 m relay team and reached the semi-finals of the 100 metres.

Aigboboh competed for Ireland at the 2025 European Athletics Team Championships in Maribor, Slovenia, in June 2025. Running alongside Michael Farrelly, Marcus Lawler and Israel Olatunde, he set a new Irish 4 x 100 metres relay national record. In July, he won the Irish U23 national title over 100 metres. In August at the senior 2025 Irish Championships, Aigboboh, Joseph Ojewumi, Joseph Finnegan Murphy and Dubem Amah combined to win the Irish 4 × 100 m relay title for Tallaght in 41.66 seconds. He was also runner-up to Bori Akinola over 100 metres at the championships.

Competing for the University of Houston in the United States at the Penn Relays in April 2026, Aigboboh ran a new personal best time of 10.27 seconds for the 100 metres. That month, he set a personal best of 20.54 seconds for the 200 metres while competing in Texas. On 30 April, Aigboboh set a new Irish national record in the 200 metres to win the Cameron Burrell Invitational with a wind-legal time of 20.27 seconds (+2.0 m/s) in Houston, surpassing the previous national senior record of 20.30 set by Paul Hession in 2007. In July, he ran 20.63 seconds to finish second in the 200 metres to Ebuka Nwokeji at the Cork City Sports in Ireland. At the Irish Championships on 25 July, he placed second to Benjamin Richardson in the 200 metres. Competing at the 2026 European Athletics Championships in Birmingham, England he reached the semi-finals in the 200 metres. He also ran in the men's 4 x 100 metres relay at the championships.
