= Filippo Dezza =

Italian sprinter (born 2005)

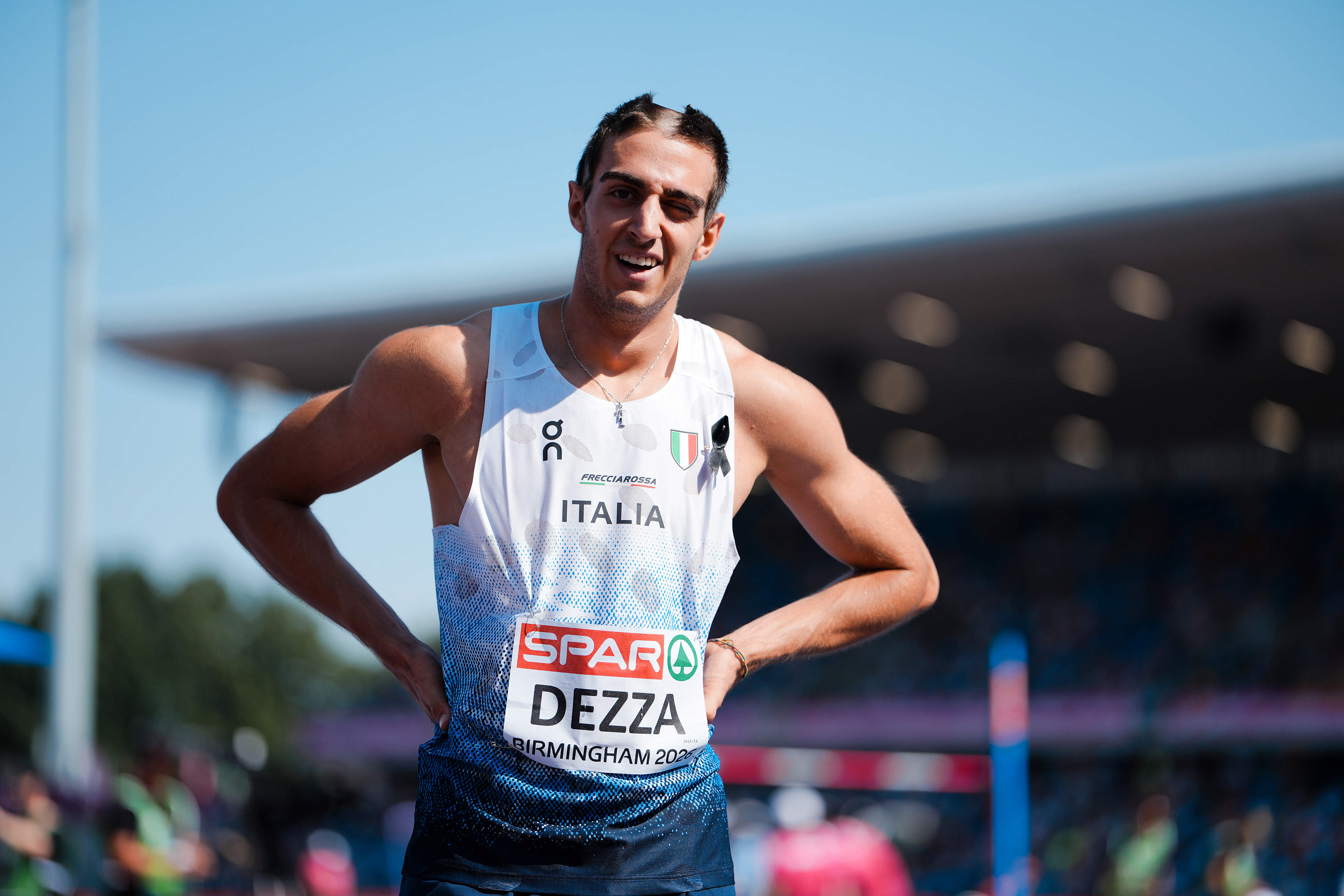

Personal information
- National team: Italy: 1 caps (2026-)
- Born: 16 August 2005 (age 21) Bergamo, Italy
- Height: 1.81 m (5 ft 11 in)
- Weight: 73 kg (161 lb)

Sport
- Sport: Athletics
- Event: Sprint
- Club: Bergamo Stars Atletica
- Coached by: Alberto Barbera

Achievements and titles
- Personal best: 200 m: 20.35 (2026)
Medal record
Men's athletics
Representing Italy
Mediterranean Games
Silver medal – second place	2026 Taranto	200 m

Filippo Dezza (born 16 August 2005) is an Italian sprinter. He won the Italian Athletics Championships in 2026 over 200 metres and was a finalist over that distance at the 2026 European Athletics Championships.

== Career ==
From Brembate di Sopra in the Province of Bergamo, Dezza is a former footballer and employee of Brembo. Following a motorcycle accident in October 2023 in which he broke both wrists and caused him to lose his job with the company, he started university in Dalmine and started in athletics at the CUS in Dalmine.

A member of Bergamo Stars Atletica, he represented Italy at the 2025 European Athletics U23 Championships. He became the 200 metres Italian champion ahead of Fausto Desalu as he won the Italian Athletics Championships in July 2026 with a personal best of 20.48 seconds. Dazza was a finalist over 200 metres at the 2026 European Athletics Championships in Birmingham, England in August 2026. He ran the fastest time in the men’s first round with a time of 20.60 seconds. He placed seventh in the final with a wind-assisted 20.58 seconds (+2.5).

== Personal life ==
He competed with his hair shaved through the middle and the sides to create an 'X' at the 2026 European Championships, having had his head shaved by Italian teammate Gianmarco Tamberi.
