= Oskars Grava =

Latvian sprinter (born 2001)

Personal information
- Born: 7 October 2001 (age 24)

Sport
- Sport: Athletics
- Event: Sprint

Oskars Grava (born 7 October 2001) is a Latvian sprinter. He is a multiple-time national champion and was a finalist in the 200 metres at the 2026 European Athletics Championships.

== Biography ==
In 2024, Grava ran the Latvian national record for the 200 metres indoors with 21.19 seconds to win the Latvian Indoor Championships.

Grava ran his personal best for the 200 metres with 20.63 seconds at the Grand Slam Jerusalem in Israel in June 2026. The following month he won the 200 metres at the Karlstad Grand Prix in Sweden. In July, he lowered his personal best to 20.52 seconds while racing in Belgium. The time moved him to 0.11 seconds of the Latvian national record set by Sergejs Inšakovs during the 1996 Olympic Games. He moved closer to it again with 20.49 seconds in winning the 2026 Latvian Championships.

Competing at the 2026 European Athletics Championships in Birmingham, England in August 2026, he qualified third-quickest from the preliminary rounds of the 200 metres, before finishing runner-up in his semi final with a wind-assisted 20.39 seconds (+3.9). He placed fifth in the final with a wind-assisted 20.28 seconds (+2.5).
