= 2026 European Athletics Championships =

27th European Athletics Championships
- Dates: 10–16 August 2026
- Host city: Birmingham, United Kingdom
- Venue: Alexander Stadium
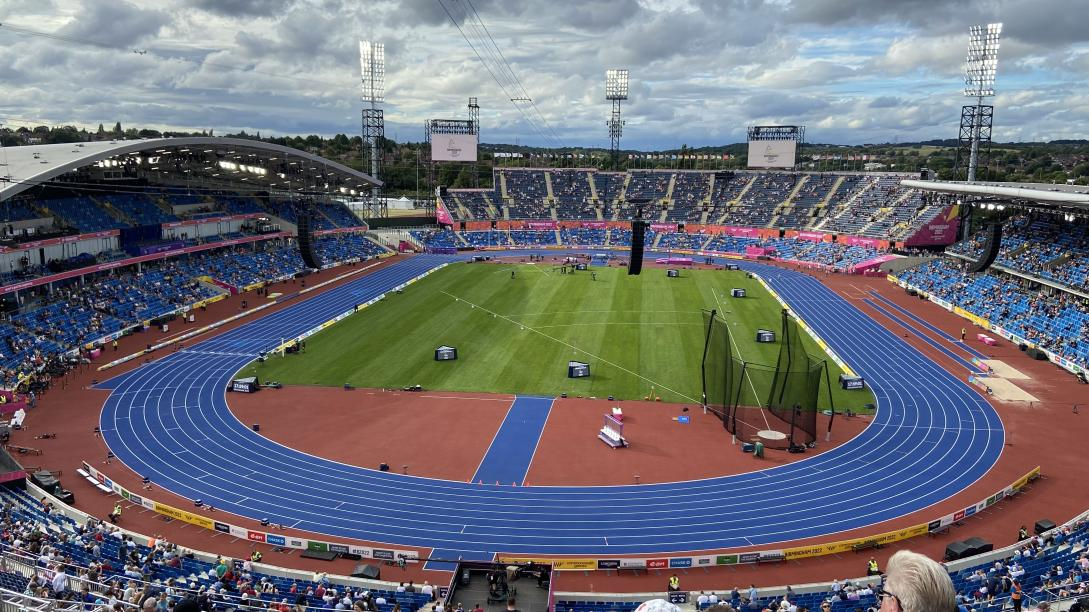
- Level: Senior
- Type: Outdoor
- Events: 50
- Participation: 1,645 athletes from 49 nations
- Official website: www.birmingham26.com

The 2026 European Athletics Championships were held from 10 to 16 August 2026 at the Alexander Stadium in Birmingham, United Kingdom.

It was the 27th time European Athletics Championships was organized and the first time that a British city staged these championships, although Birmingham has hosted many high-profile events, including the 2003, the 2007 European Athletics Indoor Championships, the 2018 IAAF World Indoor Championships, and the 2022 Commonwealth Games. Alexander Stadium was renovated between 2019 and 2022 and has two permanent stands seating 18,000, with the option of extending to 40,000 for major events.

On 11 November 2022, the European Athletic Association (EAA) chose Birmingham at its Council Meeting held in Warsaw, Poland. The British city was selected after the Hungarian capital Budapest pulled out of the bidding. Previously, in June 2022, the EAA had announced that the 2026 European Athletics Championships would be held as a standalone event separate from the multi-sport European Championships, as part of which they last took place in 2018 and 2022.

== Event schedule ==
In June 2025, European Athletics announced the timetable for the championships.

| Q | Qualification | R1 | Round 1 | SF | Semi-finals | F | Final |
M = morning session, E = evening session

Men's events per day
| Date → | 10 Aug | | 11 Aug | | | 12 Aug | | | 13 Aug | | 14 Aug | | 15 Aug | | 16 Aug | |
| Event ↓ | M | E | M | E | | M | E | | M | E | M | E | M | E | M | E |
|---|---|---|---|---|---|---|---|---|---|---|---|---|---|---|---|---|
| 100 m | | | R1 | SF | F | | | | | | | | | | | |
| 200 m | | | | | | | | | R1 | SF | | F | | | | |
| 400 m | R1 | | | SF | | | F | | | | | | | | | |
| 800 m | R1 | | | | | SF | | | | F | | | | | | |
| 1500 m | | | | | | | | | | | R1 | | | F | | |
| 5000 m | | F | | | | | | | | | | | | | | |
| 10,000 m | | | | | | | | | | | | | | F | | |
| Marathon | | | | | | | | | | | | | | | F | |
| 3000 m steeplechase | | | | | | | | | R1 | | | | | | | F |
| 110 m hurdles | | | R1 | | | | SF | F | | | | | | | | |
| 400 m hurdles | | | R1 | | | SF | | | | | | F | | | | |
| High jump | | | Q | | | | | | | | | F | | | | |
| Pole vault | | | | | | | | | | | Q | | | | | F |
| Long jump | Q | | | F | | | | | | | | | | | | |
| Triple jump | | | | | | | Q | | | | | | | F | | |
| Shot put | Q | F | | | | | | | | | | | | | | |
| Discus throw | | | Q | | | | | | | F | | | | | | |
| Hammer throw | Q | | | F | | | | | | | | | | | | |
| Javelin throw | | | | | | | | | Q | | | | | F | | |
| Decathlon | | | | | | F | | | | | | | | | | |
| Half marathon race walk | | | | | | | | | | | | | F | | | |
| Marathon race walk | | | | | | | | | | | | | F | | | |
| 4 × 100 m relay | | | | | | | | | | | | | R1 | F | | |
| 4 × 400 m relay | | | | | | | | | | | R1 | | | | | F |

Women's events per day
| Date → | 10 Aug | | | 11 Aug | | | 12 Aug | | 13 Aug | | 14 Aug | | 15 Aug | | 16 Aug | |
| Event ↓ | M | E | | M | E | | M | E | M | E | M | E | M | E | M | E |
|---|---|---|---|---|---|---|---|---|---|---|---|---|---|---|---|---|
| 100 m | R1 | SF | F | | | | | | | | | | | | | |
| 200 m | | | | | | | R1 | SF | | F | | | | | | |
| 400 m | | | | | | | R1 | | SF | | | | | F | | |
| 800 m | | | | R1 | | | | | SF | | | F | | | | |
| 1500 m | | | | | | | | | | | | | R1 | | | F |
| 5000 m | | | | | F | | | | | | | | | | | |
| 10,000 m | | | | | | | | | | | | F | | | | |
| Marathon | | | | | | | | | | | | | | | F | |
| 3000 m steeplechase | | R1 | | | | | | | | F | | | | | | |
| 100 m hurdles | | R1 | | | SF | F | | | | | | | | | | |
| 400 m hurdles | R1 | | | SF | | | | F | | | | | | | | |
| High jump | | | | | | | | | Q | | | | | F | | |
| Pole vault | | | | | Q | | | | | F | | | | | | |
| Long jump | | | | | | | | | | | | | Q | | | F |
| Triple jump | | Q | | | | | | | | F | | | | | | |
| Shot put | Q | F | | | | | | | | | | | | | | |
| Discus throw | | | | | | | Q | | | | | F | | | | |
| Hammer throw | | Q | | | | | | F | | | | | | | | |
| Javelin throw | | | | | | | | | | | Q | | | | | F |
| Heptathlon | | | | | | | | | | | F | | | | | |
| Half marathon race walk | | | | | | | | | | | | | F | | | |
| Marathon race walk | | | | | | | | | | | | | F | | | |
| 4 × 100 m relay | | | | | | | | | | | | | R1 | F | | |
| 4 × 400 m relay | | | | | | | | | | | R1 | | | | | F |

Mixed events per day
| Date → | 10 Aug | | 11 Aug | | 12 Aug | | 13 Aug | | 14 Aug | | 15 Aug | | 16 Aug |
| Event ↓ | M | E | M | E | M | E | M | E | M | E | M | E | E |
|---|---|---|---|---|---|---|---|---|---|---|---|---|---|
| 4 × 100 m relay | | | | | | | | | | | | | F |
| 4 × 400 m relay | | F | | | | | | | | | | | |

== Medal table ==
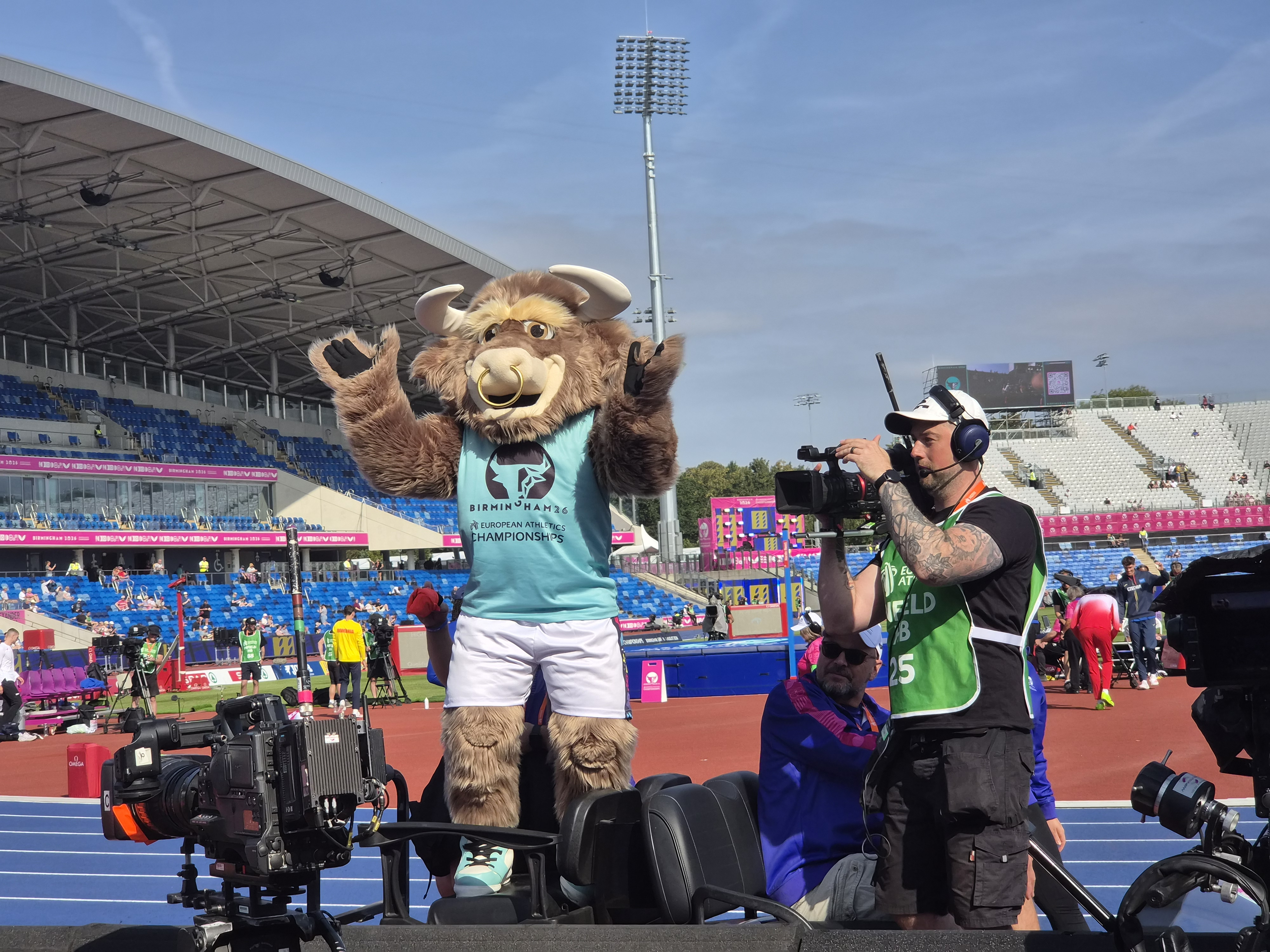
Mascot

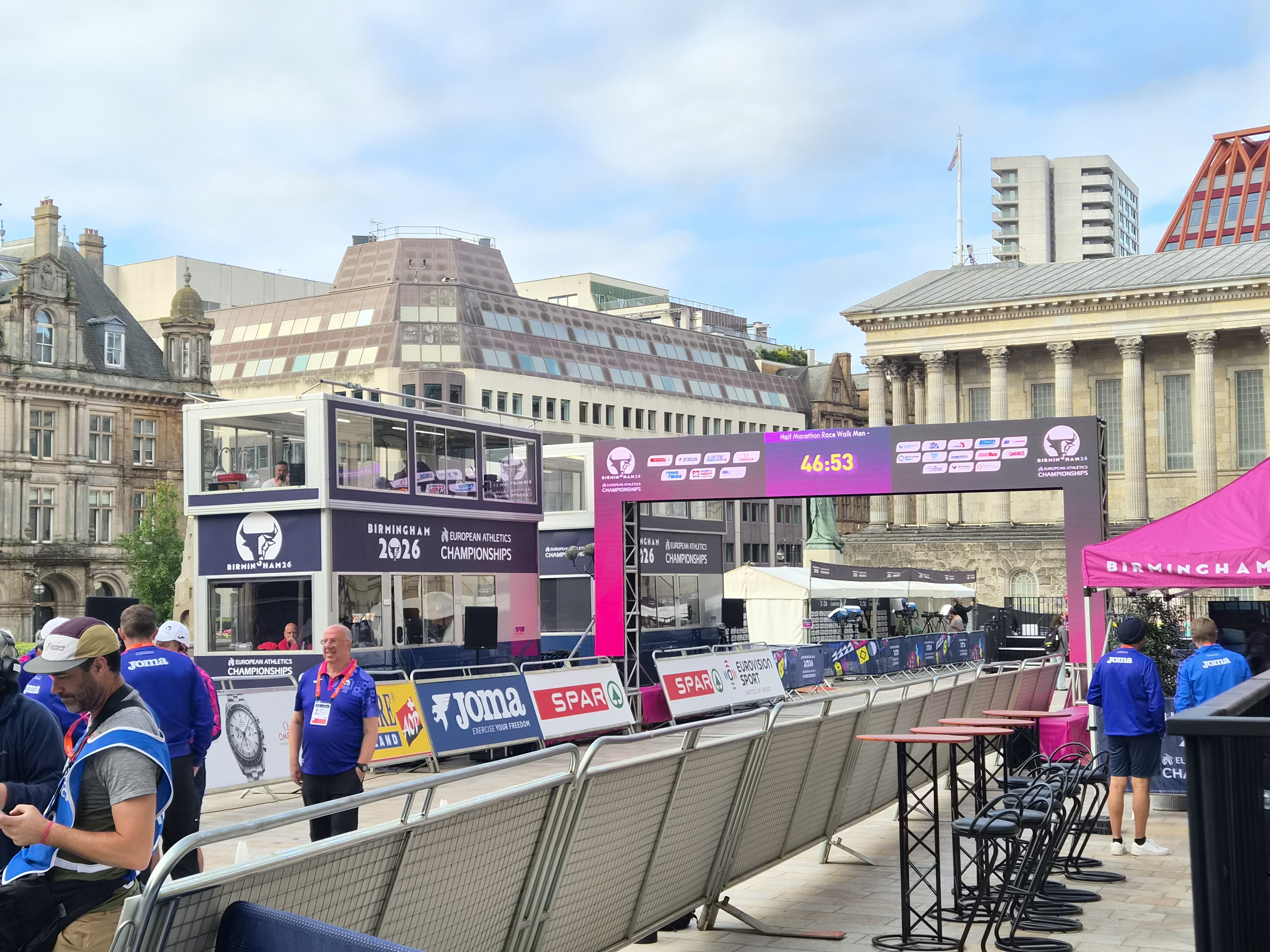
Marathon and race walk track

* Host nation (Great Britain & N.I.)

| Rank | Nation | Gold | Silver | Bronze | Total |
|---|---|---|---|---|---|
| 1 | Italy | 10 | 6 | 6 | 22 |
| 2 | Great Britain & N.I.* | 9 | 8 | 2 | 19 |
| 3 | Germany | 6 | 10 | 5 | 21 |
| 4 | Netherlands | 5 | 3 | 6 | 14 |
| 5 | Norway | 4 | 0 | 2 | 6 |
| 6 | Switzerland | 3 | 3 | 1 | 7 |
| 7 | Spain | 2 | 2 | 4 | 8 |
| 8 | Sweden | 2 | 1 | 2 | 5 |
| 9 | Ireland | 2 | 1 | 1 | 4 |
| 10 | Finland | 2 | 1 | 0 | 3 |
| 11 | Ukraine | 1 | 1 | 2 | 4 |
| 12 | Croatia | 1 | 1 | 0 | 2 |
| 12 | Greece | 1 | 1 | 0 | 2 |
| 12 | Hungary | 1 | 1 | 0 | 2 |
| 15 | Israel | 1 | 0 | 1 | 2 |
| 16 | Slovakia | 1 | 0 | 0 | 1 |
| 16 | Slovenia | 1 | 0 | 0 | 1 |
| 18 | Poland | 0 | 6 | 2 | 8 |
| 19 | France | 0 | 3 | 8 | 11 |
| 20 | Belgium | 0 | 1 | 3 | 4 |
| 21 | Portugal | 0 | 1 | 2 | 3 |
| 22 | Lithuania | 0 | 1 | 0 | 1 |
| 22 | Luxembourg | 0 | 1 | 0 | 1 |
| 24 | Bulgaria | 0 | 0 | 2 | 2 |
| 25 | Latvia | 0 | 0 | 1 | 1 |
| 25 | Montenegro | 0 | 0 | 1 | 1 |
| 25 | Serbia | 0 | 0 | 1 | 1 |
| 25 | Turkey | 0 | 0 | 1 | 1 |
| Totals (28 entries) | | 52 | 52 | 53 | 157 |

Italy topped the final medal table with 22 medals, including 10 gold medals. Great Britain & Northern Ireland finished second with 19 medals, including nine golds, while Germany was third with 21 medals, including six golds.

== Placing table ==
| Rank | Nation | 1st | | 2nd | | 3rd | | 4th | | 5th | | 6th | | 7th | | 8th | | Total |
| Rank | Nation | Pl | Pts | Pl | Pts | Pl | Pts | Pl | Pts | Pl | Pts | Pl | Pts | Pl | Pts | Pl | Pts | Total |
|---|---|---|---|---|---|---|---|---|---|---|---|---|---|---|---|---|---|---|
| 1 | Italy | 10 | 80 | 6 | 42 | 6 | 36 | 2 | 10 | 6 | 24 | 7 | 21 | 6 | 12 | 2 | 2 | 226 |
| 2 | Great Britain | 9 | 72 | 8 | 56 | 2 | 12 | 3 | 15 | 8 | 32 | 6 | 18 | 2 | 4 | 4 | 4 | 213 |
| 3 | Germany | 6 | 48 | 10 | 70 | 5 | 30 | 2 | 10 | 6 | 24 | 2 | 6 | 2 | 4 | 4 | 4 | 196 |
| 4 | France | 0 | 0 | 3 | 21 | 8 | 48 | 7 | 35 | 5 | 20 | 7 | 21 | 6 | 12 | 5 | 5 | 162 |
| 5 | Netherlands | 5 | 40 | 3 | 21 | 6 | 36 | 4 | 20 | 1 | 4 | 2 | 6 | 2 | 4 | 0 | 0 | 131 |
| 6 | Spain | 2 | 16 | 2 | 14 | 4 | 24 | 5 | 25 | 1 | 4 | 4 | 12 | 6 | 12 | 5 | 5 | 112 |
| 7 | Poland | 0 | 0 | 6 | 42 | 2 | 12 | 3 | 15 | 4 | 16 | 2 | 6 | 4 | 8 | 2 | 2 | 101 |
| 8 | Switzerland | 3 | 24 | 3 | 21 | 1 | 6 | 5 | 25 | 0 | 0 | 1 | 3 | 2 | 4 | 5 | 5 | 88 |
| 9 | Sweden | 2 | 16 | 1 | 7 | 2 | 12 | 5 | 25 | 0 | 0 | 2 | 6 | 2 | 4 | 0 | 0 | 70 |
| 10 | Belgium | 0 | 0 | 1 | 7 | 3 | 18 | 4 | 20 | 1 | 4 | 1 | 3 | 4 | 8 | 5 | 5 | 65 |
| 11 | Norway | 4 | 32 | 0 | 0 | 2 | 12 | 1 | 5 | 1 | 4 | 2 | 6 | 2 | 4 | 0 | 0 | 63 |
| 12 | Hungary | 1 | 8 | 1 | 7 | 0 | 0 | 3 | 15 | 2 | 8 | 3 | 9 | 2 | 4 | 2 | 2 | 53 |
| 13 | Ireland | 2 | 16 | 1 | 7 | 1 | 6 | 1 | 5 | 2 | 8 | 1 | 3 | 2 | 4 | 2 | 2 | 51 |
| 14 | Portugal | 0 | 0 | 1 | 7 | 2 | 12 | 2 | 10 | 2 | 8 | 3 | 9 | 0 | 0 | 2 | 2 | 48 |
| 15 | Ukraine | 1 | 8 | 1 | 7 | 2 | 12 | 1 | 5 | 2 | 8 | 1 | 3 | 0 | 0 | 1 | 1 | 44 |
| 16 | Greece | 1 | 8 | 1 | 7 | 0 | 0 | 1 | 5 | 1 | 4 | 2 | 6 | 1 | 2 | 2 | 2 | 34 |
| 17 | Finland | 2 | 16 | 1 | 7 | 0 | 0 | 0 | 0 | 0 | 0 | 0 | 0 | 0 | 0 | 2 | 2 | 25 |
| 18 | Israel | 1 | 8 | 0 | 0 | 1 | 6 | 0 | 0 | 2 | 8 | 0 | 0 | 1 | 2 | 1 | 1 | 25 |
| 19 | Turkey | 0 | 0 | 0 | 0 | 1 | 6 | 0 | 0 | 3 | 12 | 1 | 3 | 0 | 0 | 0 | 0 | 21 |
| 20 | Croatia | 1 | 8 | 1 | 7 | 0 | 0 | 0 | 0 | 0 | 0 | 1 | 3 | 0 | 0 | 0 | 0 | 18 |
| 21 | Czech Republic | 0 | 0 | 0 | 0 | 0 | 0 | 2 | 10 | 1 | 4 | 0 | 0 | 1 | 2 | 1 | 1 | 17 |
| 22 | Lithuania | 0 | 0 | 1 | 7 | 0 | 0 | 1 | 5 | 0 | 0 | 1 | 3 | 0 | 0 | 0 | 0 | 15 |
| 23 | Slovenia | 1 | 8 | 0 | 0 | 0 | 0 | 0 | 0 | 0 | 0 | 0 | 0 | 2 | 4 | 0 | 0 | 12 |
| 24 | Bulgaria | 0 | 0 | 0 | 0 | 2 | 12 | 0 | 0 | 0 | 0 | 0 | 0 | 0 | 0 | 0 | 0 | 12 |
| 25 | Serbia | 0 | 0 | 0 | 0 | 1 | 6 | 0 | 0 | 1 | 4 | 0 | 0 | 0 | 0 | 2 | 2 | 12 |
| 26 | Luxembourg | 0 | 0 | 1 | 7 | 0 | 0 | 0 | 0 | 0 | 0 | 1 | 3 | 0 | 0 | 0 | 0 | 10 |
| 27 | Latvia | 0 | 0 | 0 | 0 | 1 | 6 | 0 | 0 | 1 | 4 | 0 | 0 | 0 | 0 | 0 | 0 | 10 |
| 28 | Slovakia | 1 | 8 | 0 | 0 | 0 | 0 | 0 | 0 | 0 | 0 | 0 | 0 | 0 | 0 | 0 | 0 | 8 |
| 29 | Austria | 0 | 0 | 0 | 0 | 0 | 0 | 0 | 0 | 1 | 4 | 1 | 3 | 0 | 0 | 0 | 0 | 7 |
| 30 | Estonia | 0 | 0 | 0 | 0 | 0 | 0 | 0 | 0 | 1 | 4 | 0 | 0 | 2 | 4 | 0 | 0 | 8 |
| 31 | Montenegro | 0 | 0 | 0 | 0 | 1 | 6 | 0 | 0 | 0 | 0 | 0 | 0 | 0 | 0 | 0 | 0 | 6 |
| 32 | Romania | 0 | 0 | 0 | 0 | 0 | 0 | 0 | 0 | 1 | 4 | 0 | 0 | 1 | 2 | 0 | 0 | 6 |
| 33 | Iceland | 0 | 0 | 0 | 0 | 0 | 0 | 0 | 0 | 0 | 0 | 0 | 0 | 1 | 2 | 0 | 0 | 2 |
| 34 | Cyprus | 0 | 0 | 0 | 0 | 0 | 0 | 0 | 0 | 0 | 0 | 0 | 0 | 0 | 0 | 1 | 1 | 1 |

== Medal summary ==
=== Men ===
Track

Chronology: 2022 | 2024 | 2026 | 2028 | 2030

| Event | Gold | | Silver | | Bronze | |
|---|---|---|---|---|---|---|
| 100 metres | Romell Glave; Great Britain & N.I. (GBR) | 10.09 | Jeremiah Azu; Great Britain & N.I. (GBR) | 10.16 | Owen Ansah; Germany (GER) | 10.19 |
| 200 metres | Owen Ansah; Germany (GER) | 19.95 | Zharnel Hughes; Great Britain & N.I. (GBR) | 20.16 | Fausto Desalu; Italy (ITA) Timothé Mumenthaler; Switzerland (SUI) | 20.26 |
| 400 metres | Matthew Hudson-Smith; Great Britain & N.I. (GBR) | 44.17 | Muhammad Abdallah Kounta; France (FRA) | 44.40 | Jonas Phijffers; Netherlands (NED) | 44.41 NR |
| 800 metres | Mark English; Ireland (IRL) | 1:45.26 | Marino Bloudek; Croatia (CRO) | 1:45.62 | Mohamed Attaoui; Spain (ESP) | 1:45.71 |
| 1500 metres | Stefan Nillessen; Netherlands (NED) | 3:35.70 | Samuel Pihlström; Sweden (SWE) | 3:36.16 | Andrew Coscoran; Ireland (IRL) | 3:36.24 |
| 5000 metres | Jakob Ingebrigtsen; Norway (NOR) | 13:15.29 SB | Florian Bremm; Germany (GER) | 13:15.60 | Etienne Daguinos; France (FRA) | 13:16.09 |
| 10,000 metres | Andreas Almgren; Sweden (SWE) | 27:23.44 CR | Dominic Lokinyomo Lobalu; Switzerland (SUI) | 27:42.67 SB | Jimmy Gressier; France (FRA) | 28:07.90 SB |
| Marathon | Amanal Petros; Germany (GER) | 2:09.11 CR | Pietro Riva; Italy (ITA) | 2:09.18 | Gashau Ayale; Israel (ISR) | 2:09.21 |
| Marathon team details | Israel; Gashau Ayale; Tadesse Getahon; Haimro Alame | 6:28:37 | Germany; Amanal Petros; Samuel Fitwi Sibhatu; Richard Ringer | 6:29:03 | France; Valentin Gondouin; Emmanuel Roudolff; Hassan Chahdi | 6:32:12 |
| 110 metres hurdles | Jason Joseph; Switzerland (SUI) | 13.10 SB | Just Kwaou-Mathey; France (FRA) | 13.16 SB | Jakub Szymański; Poland (POL) | 13.26 =SB |
| 400 metres hurdles | Karsten Warholm; Norway (NOR) | 46.63 CR | Emil Agyekum; Germany (GER) | 47.87 | İsmail Nezir; Turkey (TUR) | 48.26 |
| 3000 metres steeplechase | Frederik Ruppert; Germany (GER) | 8:25.33 | Ruben Querinjean; Luxembourg (LUX) | 8:25.61 | Karl Bebendorf; Germany (GER) | 8:26.65 |
| 4 × 100 metres relay | Great Britain & N.I. Jeremiah Azu; Louie Hinchliffe; Zharnel Hughes; Romell Glave | 38.45 | Germany; Kevin Kranz; Marvin Schulte; Heiko Gussmann; Lucas Ansah-Peprah | 38.64 | Belgium; Ibrahim Camara; Emiel Botterman; Antoine Snyders; Simon Verherstraeten; Amine Kasmi* | 38.70 |
| 4 × 400 metres relay | Italy; Edoardo Scotti; Luca Sito; Mohamed Soudassi; Lorenzo Benati | 2:59.16 | Great Britain & N.I. Matthew Hudson-Smith; Toby Harries; Ben Jefferies; Charlie Dobson; Sam Lunt*; Malique Smith-Band* | 2:59.19 SB | Netherlands; Eugene Omalla; Keenan Blake; Terrence Agard; Jonas Phijffers; Liemarvin Bonevacia*; Daan Kneppers* | 2:59.49 |
| Half marathon race walk | Paul McGrath; Spain (ESP) | 1:23:23 PB | Francesco Fortunato; Italy (ITA) | 1:23:36 | Andrea Cosi; Italy (ITA) | 1:23:49 PB |
| Marathon race walk | Massimo Stano; Italy (ITA) | 2:56:49 AR, WL | Miguel Ángel López; Spain (ESP) | 2:56:57 PB | Aurélien Quinion; France (FRA) | 2:59:29 PB |
WR world record | ER European record | CR championship record | NR national record | WL world leading | EL European leading | PB personal best | SB seasonal best

Field

Chronology: 2022 | 2024 | 2026 | 2028 | 2030

| Event | Gold | | Silver | | Bronze | |
|---|---|---|---|---|---|---|
| High jump | Gianmarco Tamberi; Italy (ITA) | 2.32 m SB | Oleh Doroshchuk; Ukraine (UKR) | 2.30 m | Matteo Sioli; Italy (ITA) | 2.27 m |
| Pole vault | Armand Duplantis; Sweden (SWE) | 6.15 m CR | Emmanouil Karalis; Greece (GRE) | 6.00 m | Baptiste Thiery; France (FRA) | 5.85 m |
| Long jump | Miltiadis Tentoglou; Greece (GRE) | 8.44 m | Simon Ehammer; Switzerland (SUI) | 8.29 m | Bozhidar Sarâboyukov; Bulgaria (BUL) | 8.26 m |
| Triple jump | Andy Díaz; Italy (ITA) | 18.15 m WL, NR | Pedro Pichardo; Portugal (POR) | 17.76 m | Andrea Dallavalle; Italy (ITA) | 17.37 m |
| Shot put | Leonardo Fabbri; Italy (ITA) | 22.31 m | Zane Weir; Italy (ITA) | 21.12 m | Wictor Petersson; Sweden (SWE) | 20.97 m |
| Discus throw | Kristjan Čeh; Slovenia (SLO) | 72.51 m CR | Mykolas Alekna; Lithuania (LTU) | 69.89 m | Henrik Janssen; Germany (GER) | 69.53 m SB |
| Javelin throw | Julian Weber; Germany (GER) | 90.40 m CR, EL | Nick Thumm; Germany (GER) | 83.76 m PB | Patriks Gailums; Latvia (LAT) | 82.97 m |
| Hammer throw | Bence Halász; Hungary (HUN) | 84.25 m WL, NR | Merlin Hummel; Germany (GER) | 81.30 m | Mykhaylo Kokhan; Ukraine (UKR) | 79.49 m |
| Decathlon | Leo Neugebauer; Germany (GER) | 8611 pts | Niklas Kaul; Germany (GER) | 8573 pts | Sander Skotheim; Norway (NOR) | 8433 pts SB |
WR world record | ER European record | CR championship record | NR national record | WL world leading | EL European leading | PB personal best | SB seasonal best

=== Women ===
Track

Amy Hunt became the first athlete, male or female, to win four gold medals at a single edition of the European Championships. Her compatriot, Dina Asher-Smith, with two gold and one bronze medal, became the most decorated athlete in the history of the championships with eleven career medals, including eight gold medals.

Chronology: 2022 | 2024 | 2026 | 2028 | 2030

| Event | Gold | | Silver | | Bronze | |
|---|---|---|---|---|---|---|
| 100 metres | Amy Hunt; Great Britain & N.I. (GBR) | 11.00 | Ewa Swoboda; Poland (POL) | 11.02 | Delphine Nkansa; Belgium (BEL) | 11.06 PB |
| 200 metres | Amy Hunt; Great Britain & N.I. (GBR) | 22.19 EL | Rhasidat Adeleke; Ireland (IRL) | 22.28 NR | Dina Asher-Smith; Great Britain & N.I. (GBR) | 22.29 |
| 400 metres | Henriette Jæger; Norway (NOR) | 49.04 EL, NR | Natalia Bukowiecka; Poland (POL) | 50.04 | Lieke Klaver; Netherlands (NED) | 50.15 |
| 800 metres | Audrey Werro; Switzerland (SUI) | 1:54.81 CR | Keely Hodgkinson; Great Britain & N.I. (GBR) | 1:55.01 | Femke Broeders-Bol; Netherlands (NED) | 1:55.54 =NR |
| 1500 metres | Georgia Hunter Bell; Great Britain & N.I. (GBR) | 4:07.78 | Klaudia Kazimierska; Poland (POL) | 4:08.80 | Patricia Silva; Portugal (POR) | 4:09.22 |
| 5000 metres | Nadia Battocletti; Italy (ITA) | 15:37.84 | Marta García; Spain (ESP) | 15:39.98 SB | Micol Majori; Italy (ITA) | 15:40.65 |
| 10,000 metres | Nadia Battocletti; Italy (ITA) | 31:41.17 SB | Maureen Koster; Netherlands (NED) | 31:45.76 | Jana van Lent; Belgium (BEL) | 31:47.81 |
| Marathon | Alisa Vainio; Finland (FIN) | 2:22:26 CR | Lili Anna Vindics-Tóth; Hungary (HUN) | 2:27.21 PB | Abbie Donnelly; Great Britain & N.I. (GBR) | 2:27.33 SB |
| Marathon team | Great Britain & N.I. Abbie Donnelly; Natasha Wilson; Rose Harvey | 7:26:01 | Italy; Rebecca Lonedo; Sofiia Yaremchuk; Giovanna Epis | 7:28:59 | Spain; Carolina Robles; Fatima Ouhaddou; Ester Navarrete | 7:30:41 |
| 100 metres hurdles | Nadine Visser; Netherlands (NED) | 12.67 | Pia Skrzyszowska; Poland (POL) | 12.67 | Laëticia Bapté; France (FRA) | 12.73 |
| 400 metres hurdles | Emma Zapletalová; Slovakia (SVK) | 52.91 | Emily Newnham; Great Britain & N.I. (GBR) | 53.33 PB | Fatoumata Binta Diallo; Portugal (POR) | 53.55 NR |
| 3000 metres steeplechase | Gesa Felicitas Krause; Germany (GER) | 9:12.69 | Alice Finot; France (FRA) | 9:14.24 SB | Olivia Gürth; Germany (GER) | 9:15.33 SB |
| 4 × 100 metres relay | Great Britain & N.I. Dina Asher-Smith; Amy Hunt; Success Eduan; Imani Lansiquot; Kristal Ama-Awuah* | 42.05 EL | Switzerland; Géraldine Di Tizio-Frey; Fabienne Hoenke; Léonie Pointet; Salomé Kora; Ajla Del Ponte* | 43.12 | Poland; Krystsina Tsimanouskaya; Pia Skrzyszowska; Magdalena Stefanowicz; Ewa Swoboda; Wiktoria Gajosz* | 43.15 |
| 4 × 400 metres relay | Netherlands; Myrte van der Schoot; Lieke Klaver; Eveline Saalberg; Femke Broeders-Bol; Vanessa Mercera*; Nina Franke* | 3:21.10 SB | Great Britain & N.I. Yemi Mary John; Lina Nielsen; Nicole Yeargin; Emily Newnham; Charlotte Henrich* | 3:21.68 | Italy; Alessandra Bonora; Anna Polinari; Alice Mangione; Eloisa Coiro; Ilaria Elvira Accame*; Sara Cirillo* | 3:23.57 |
| Half marathon race walk | María Pérez; Spain (ESP) | 1:30:06 WR | Alexandrina Mihai; Italy (ITA) | 1:31:04 PB | Lyudmila Olyanovska; Ukraine (UKR) | 1:31:07 NR |
| Marathon race walk | Sofia Fiorini; Italy (ITA) | 3:15:11 WR | Katarzyna Zdziebło; Poland (POL) | 3:19:50 NR | Raquel González; Spain (ESP) | 3:20:49 PB |
WR world record | ER European record | CR championship record | NR national record | WL world leading | EL European leading | PB personal best | SB seasonal best

Field

Chronology: 2022 | 2024 | 2026 | 2028 | 2030

| Event | Gold | | Silver | | Bronze | |
|---|---|---|---|---|---|---|
| High jump | Yaroslava Mahuchikh; Ukraine (UKR) | 1.97 m | Maria Żodzik; Poland (POL) | 1.95 m | Marija Vuković; Montenegro (MNE) | 1.95 m |
| Pole vault | Angelica Moser; Switzerland (SUI) | 4.80 m =SB | Wilma Heltelä; Finland (FIN) | 4.75 m | Marie-Julie Bonnin; France (FRA) | 4.70 m |
| Long jump | Larissa Iapichino; Italy (ITA) | 7.00 m | Jazmin Sawyers; Great Britain & N.I. (GBR) | 6.99 m SB | Hilary Kpatcha; France (FRA) | 6.98 m |
| Triple jump | Dariya Derkach; Italy (ITA) | 14.60 m EL, PB | Saliyya Guisse; Belgium (BEL) | 14.46 m PB | Aleksandra Nacheva; Bulgaria (BUL) | 14.40 m |
| Shot put | Jessica Schilder; Netherlands (NED) | 20.73 m | Jorinde van Klinken; Netherlands (NED) | 19.64 m PB | Yemisi Mabry; Germany (GER) | 19.50 m |
| Discus throw | Jorinde van Klinken; Netherlands (NED) | 67.67 m | Shanice Craft; Germany (GER) | 65.72 m | Vanessa Kamga; Sweden (SWE) | 64.61 m |
| Javelin throw | Sara Kolak; Croatia (CRO) | 62.43 m | Julia Ulbricht; Germany (GER) | 61.53 m | Adriana Vilagoš; Serbia (SRB) | 60.93 m |
| Hammer throw | Silja Kosonen; Finland (FIN) | 76.28 m | Sara Fantini; Italy (ITA) | 74.35 m | Beatrice Nedberge Llano; Norway (NOR) | 72.88 m |
| Heptathlon | Kate O'Connor; Ireland (IRL) | 6751 pts | Emma Oosterwegel; Netherlands (NED) | 6713 pts | Sofie Dokter; Netherlands (NED) | 6664 pts |
WR world record | ER European record | CR championship record | NR national record | WL world leading | EL European leading | PB personal best | SB seasonal best

=== Mixed ===
Chronology: 2022 | 2024 | 2026 | 2028 | 2030

| Event | Gold | | Silver | | Bronze | |
|---|---|---|---|---|---|---|
| 4 × 100 metres relay | Great Britain & N.I. Jeremiah Azu; Dina Asher-Smith; Zharnel Hughes; Amy Hunt | 39.97 ER | Germany; Kevin Kranz; Rebekka Haase; Heiko Gussmann; Gina Lückenkemper | 40.11 NR | Spain; Guillem Crespí; María Isabel Pérez; Andoni Calbano; Jaël Bestué | 40.42 NR |
| 4 × 400 metres relay | Norway; Karsten Warholm; Amalie Iuel; Andreas Ofstad Kulseng; Henriette Jæger | 3:09.62 CR, EL, NR | Great Britain & N.I. Ben Jefferies; Charlotte Henrich; Toby Harries; Yemi Mary John | 3:10.47 | Netherlands; Jonas Phijffers; Lieke Klaver; Terrence Agard; Myrte van der Schoot | 3:10.77 SB |
WR world record | ER European record | CR championship record | NR national record | WL world leading | EL European leading | PB personal best | SB seasonal best

== Participating nations ==
1645 athletes, 805 females and 840 males, from 49 countries are expected to participate.

- Albania (3)
- Andorra (1)
- Armenia (2)
- Austria (23)
- Azerbaijan (2)
- Belgium (61)
- Bosnia and Herzegovina (1)
- Bulgaria (6)
- Croatia (16)
- Cyprus (12)
- Czech Republic (54)
- Denmark (28)
- Estonia (20)
- Finland (72)
- France (86)
- Georgia (2)
- Germany (128)
- Gibraltar (1)
- Great Britain & N.I. (108)
- Greece (61)
- Hungary (52)
- Iceland (8)
- Ireland (55)
- Israel (18)
- Italy (135)
- Kosovo (2)
- Latvia (7)
- Liechtenstein (1)
- Lithuania (19)
- Luxembourg (3)
- Malta (2)
- Moldova (5)
- Monaco (1)
- Montenegro (2)
- Netherlands (62)
- North Macedonia (1)
- Norway (56)
- Poland (75)
- Portugal (55)
- Romania (13)
- San Marino (2)
- Serbia (13)
- Slovakia (23)
- Slovenia (27)
- Spain (103)
- Sweden (73)
- Switzerland (69)
- Turkey (50)
- Ukraine (25)
