= 2023 European Athletics Indoor Championships – Men's 60 metres =

Men's 60 metres at the 2023 European Athletics Indoor Championships
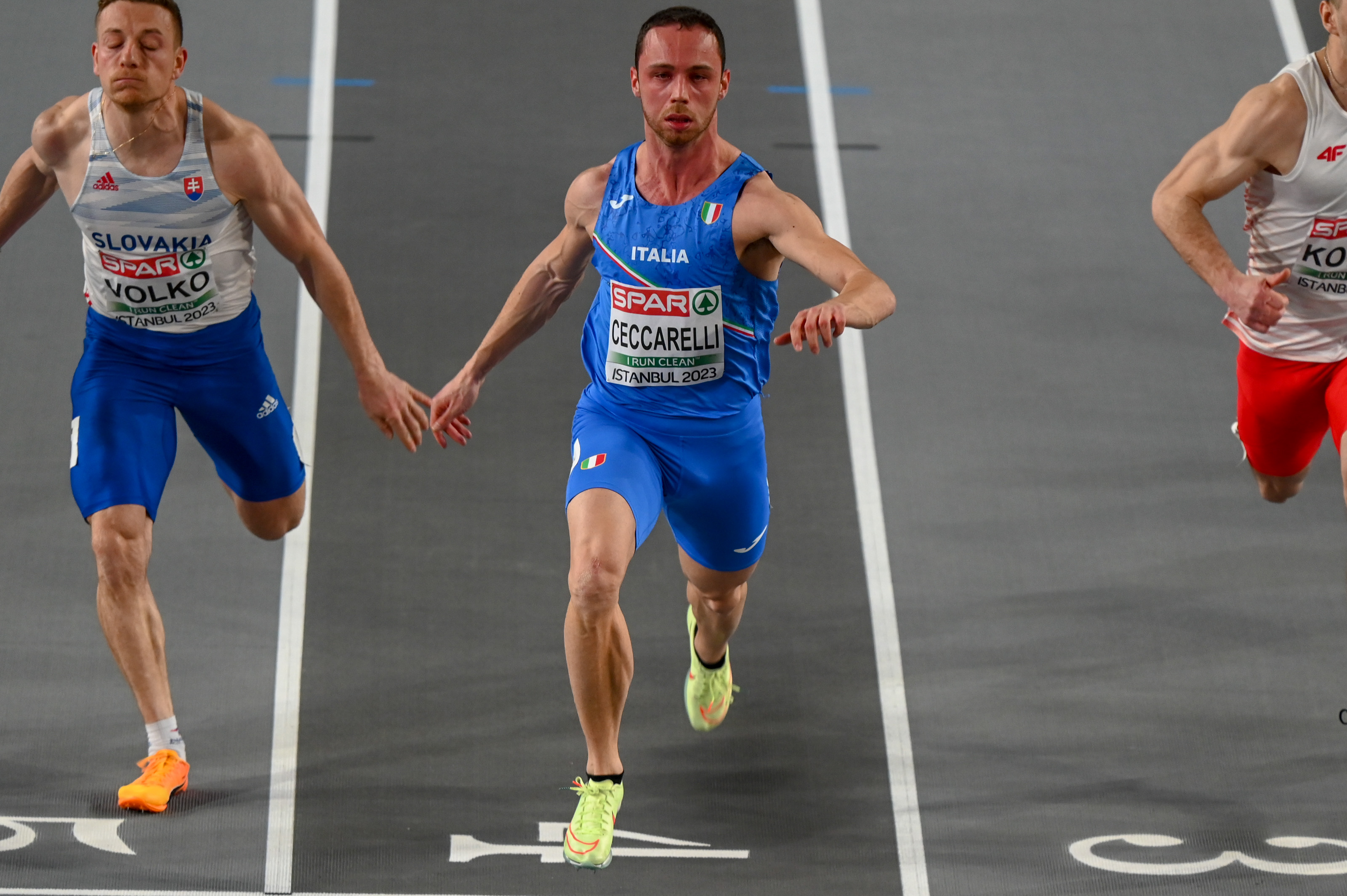
- Ceccarelli finishing in the semi-final.
- Venue: Ataköy Athletics Arena
- Location: Istanbul, Turkey
- Dates: 4 March 2023
- Competitors: 37 from 26 nations
- Winning time: 6.48

Medalists
gold medal	Samuele Ceccarelli	Italy
silver medal	Marcell Jacobs	Italy
bronze medal	Henrik Larsson	Sweden

The men's 60 metres event at the 2023 European Athletics Indoor Championships was held on 4 March 2023 at 09:20 (heats), at 18:45 (semi-finals) and at 20:55 (final) local time.

== Records ==
Standing records prior to the 2023 European Athletics Indoor Championships
World record	Christian Coleman (USA)	6.34	Albuquerque, United States	18 February 2018
European record	Marcell Jacobs (ITA)	6.41	Belgrade, Serbia	19 March 2022
Championship record	Dwain Chambers (GBR)	6.42	Turin, Italy	7 March 2009
World Leading	Trayvon Bromell (USA)	6.42	Clemson, South Carolina, United States	10 February 2023
European Leading	Reece Prescod (GBR)	6.49	Berlin, Germany	10 February 2023

== Results ==
=== Heats ===
Qualification: First 4 in each heat (Q) and the next 4 fastest (q) advance to the semifinals.

Rank	Heat	Athlete	Nationality	Time	Note
1	5	Marcell Jacobs	Italy	6.57	Q
2	3	Raphael Bouju	Netherlands	6.59	Q, PB
3	1	Reece Prescod	Great Britain	6.60	Q
4	5	Pascal Mancini	Switzerland	6.61	Q
5	3	Samuele Ceccarelli	Italy	6.62	Q
6	2	Ján Volko	Slovakia	6.62	Q, SB
6	4	Henrik Larsson	Sweden	6.62	Q
8	4	Karl Erik Nazarov	Estonia	6.63	Q, SB
9	2	Dominik Kopeć	Poland	6.64	Q
10	4	Jeremiah Azu	Great Britain	6.66	Q
11	2	Markus Fuchs	Austria	6.66	Q
12	4	Robin Ganter	Germany	6.67	Q
13	3	Kayhan Özer	Turkey	6.67	Q
14	1	Méba Mickaël Zézé	France	6.68	Q
15	2	Israel Olatunde	Ireland	6.68	Q
16	2	Simon Hansen	Denmark	6.69	q
17	1	Jakub Lempach	Poland	6.69	Q
17	3	Eugene Amo-Dadzie	Great Britain	6.69	Q
19	4	Emre Zafer Barnes	Turkey	6.70	q, SB
20	5	Yannick Wolf	Germany	6.71	Q
21	1	Carlos Nascimento	Portugal	6.71	Q
22	4	Stanislav Kovalenko	Ukraine	6.72	q
23	2	Ioannis Nyfantopoulos	Greece	6.72	q
24	1	Joris van Gool	Netherlands	6.72	
25	5	Dominik Illovszky	Hungary	6.73	Q
26	3	Kolbeinn Höður Gunnarsson	Iceland	6.73	
27	5	Jeff Erius	France	6.73	
28	4	Roberto Rigali	Italy	6.74	
29	5	Samuli Samuelsson	Finland	6.75	
30	5	Ertan Özkan	Turkey	6.76	
31	2	Daniel Rodríguez	Spain	6.77	
32	1	Zdeněk Stromšík	Czech Republic	6.79	
33	1	Francesco Sansovini	San Marino	6.87	
34	2	Beppe Grillo	Malta	6.95	
35	4	Craig Gill	Gibraltar	7.16	
	3	Enrico Güntert	Switzerland	DQ	
	3	Even Meinseth	Norway	DNS	

=== Semifinals ===
Qualification: First 2 in each heat (Q) and the next 2 fastest (q) advance to the Final.

Rank	Heat	Athlete	Nationality	Time	Note
1	1	Samuele Ceccarelli	Italy	6.47	Q, EL
2	3	Marcell Jacobs	Italy	6.52	Q, SB
3	1	Reece Prescod	Great Britain	6.52	Q
4	2	Henrik Larsson	Sweden	6.56	Q, =NR
5	1	Ján Volko	Slovakia	6.58	q, SB
6	1	Dominik Kopeć	Poland	6.59	q
7	2	Jeremiah Azu	Great Britain	6.59	Q
8	3	Markus Fuchs	Austria	6.60	Q, PB
9	2	Raphael Bouju	Netherlands	6.61	
10	2	Jakub Lempach	Poland	6.62	PB
11	2	Karl Erik Nazarov	Estonia	6.63	
12	3	Pascal Mancini	Switzerland	6.64	
13	3	Méba Mickaël Zézé	France	6.64	
14	3	Eugene Amo-Dadzie	Great Britain	6.64	
15	1	Simon Hansen	Denmark	6.65	=PB
16	3	Kayhan Özer	Turkey	6.67	
17	1	Robin Ganter	Germany	6.68	
18	1	Israel Olatunde	Ireland	6.69	
19	2	Yannick Wolf	Germany	6.70	
20	3	Carlos Nascimento	Portugal	6.71	
21	3	Ioannis Nyfantopoulos	Greece	6.71	PB
22	2	Stanislav Kovalenko	Ukraine	6.72	
23	2	Dominik Illovszky	Hungary	6.77	
24	1	Emre Zafer Barnes	Turkey	7.02	

=== Final ===
Rank	Lane	Athlete	Nationality	Time	Note
1st place, gold medalist(s)	3	Samuele Ceccarelli	Italy	6.48	
2nd place, silver medalist(s)	6	Marcell Jacobs	Italy	6.50	SB
3rd place, bronze medalist(s)	5	Henrik Larsson	Sweden	6.53	NR
4	1	Dominik Kopeć	Poland	6.53	PB
5	2	Ján Volko	Slovakia	6.57	SB
6	7	Jeremiah Azu	Great Britain	6.58	
7	8	Markus Fuchs	Austria	6.59	PB
8	4	Reece Prescod	Great Britain	6.64	
