= 2019 European Athletics U23 Championships – Men's 4 × 100 metres relay =

The men's 4 × 100 metres relay event at the 2019 European Athletics U23 Championships was held in Gävle, Sweden, at Gavlehov Stadium Park on 14 July.

== Medalists ==
Gold	Silver	Bronze
Germany; Kevin Kranz; Marvin Schulte; Deniz Almas; Philipp Trutenat	France; Amaury Golitin; Ryan Zézé; Yanis Ammour; Max Sirguey	Belgium; Simon Verherstraeten; Kobe Vleminckx; Antoine Snyders; Raphaël Kapenda; Camille Snyders*

*Athletes who ran in heats only

== Results ==
=== Heats ===
Qualification rule: First 3 in each heat (Q) and the next 2 fastest (q) qualified for the final.

Rank	Heat	Nation	Athletes	Time	Notes
1	1	Germany	Kevin Kranz, Marvin Schulte, Deniz Almas, Philipp Trutenat	39.27	Q
2	1	Netherlands	Dominique Zwiep, Roelf Bouwmeester, Joris van Gool, Isayah Boers	39.47	Q
3	2	France	Amaury Golitin, Ryan Zézé, Yanis Ammour, Max Sirguey	39.61	Q
4	2	Belgium	Simon Verherstraeten, Kobe Vleminckx, Antoine Snyders, Camille Snyders	39.68	Q, SB
5	2	Great Britain	Dominic Ashwell, Oliver Bromby, Michael Olsen, Jona Efoloko	39.78	Q
6	2	Poland	Eryk Hampel, Rafał Pająk, Jakub Gałandziej, Adrian Brzeziński	39.90	q, SB
7	1	Belarus	Maksim Bohdan, Stanislau Darahakupets, Maksim Hrabarenka, Yury Zabalotny	39.96	Q, SB
8	1	Italy	Andrei Alexandru Zlatan, Diego Pettorossi, Andrea Federici, Nicholas Artuso	40.05	q
9	1	Denmark	Steffen Udengaard Knudsen, Albert Ranning, Simon Hansen, Peter Andersson	40.22	SB
10	1	Greece	Mihail Pappas, Ioannis Kokkinos, Panayiotis Arvanitis, Sotirios Garagganis	40.38	SB
11	1	Sweden	Max Hrelja, Marcus Torneé, Joel Bengtsson, Anders Pihlblad	40.39	
12	2	Finland	Tuukka Huuskola, Riku Illukka, Ilari Manninen, Konsta Alatupa	40.57	
13	1	Turkey	Furkan Yildirim, Cafer Güneş, Kayhan Özer, Mustafa Onur Sadıkoğlu	40.90	
	2	Portugal	Wilson Pedro, Rafael Jorge, Frederico Curvelo, André Prazeres	DNF	
	2	Ukraine	Erik Kostrytsya, Oleksandr Sokolov, Maksym Kuzin, Stanislav Kovalenko	DQ	R170.7

=== Final ===
Rank	Lane	Nation	Athletes	Time	Notes
1st place, gold medalist(s)	5	Germany	Kevin Kranz, Marvin Schulte, Deniz Almas, Philipp Trutenat	39.22	
2nd place, silver medalist(s)	4	France	Amaury Golitin, Ryan Zézé, Yanis Ammour, Max Sirguey	39.57	
3rd place, bronze medalist(s)	3	Belgium	Simon Verherstraeten, Antoine Snyders, Kobe Vleminckx, Raphaël Kapenda	39.77	
4	2	Italy	Andrei Alexandru Zlatan, Diego Pettorossi, Andrea Federici, Nicholas Artuso	39.96	
5	8	Belarus	Maksim Bohdan, Stanislau Darahakupets, Maksim Hrabarenka, Yury Zabalotny	39.99	
	7	Great Britain	Dominic Ashwell, Oliver Bromby, Michael Olsen, Jona Efoloko	DNF	
	6	Netherlands	Dominique Zwiep, Roelf Bouwmeester, Joris van Gool, Isayah Boers	DNF	
	1	Poland	Eryk Hampel, Rafał Pająk, Jakub Gałandziej, Adrian Brzeziński	DNF	
