= 2021 European Athletics Indoor Championships – Men's 60 metres =

Athetism Championship

Men's 60 metres at the 2021 European Athletics Indoor Championships
- Venue: Arena Toruń
- Location: Toruń, Poland
- Dates: 7 March 2021
- Competitors: 65 from 32 nations
- Winning time: 6.47 WL, =NR

Medalists
gold medal	Marcell Jacobs	Italy
silver medal	Kevin Kranz	Germany
bronze medal	Ján Volko	Slovakia

The men's 60 metres event at the 2021 European Athletics Indoor Championships was held on 6 March 2021 at 10:18 (heats), at 13:50 (semi-finals), and at 20:58 (final) local time.

== Records ==
Standing records prior to the 2021 European Athletics Indoor Championships
World record	Christian Coleman (USA)	6.34	Albuquerque, United States	18 February 2018
European record	Dwain Chambers (GBR)	6.42	Turin, Italy	7 March 2009
Championship record	Dwain Chambers (GBR)	6.42	Turin, Italy	7 March 2009
World Leading	Trayvon Bromell (USA)	6.48	Fayetteville, United States	24 January 2021
European Leading	Kevin Kranz (GER)	6.52	Dortmund, Germany	20 February 2021

== Results ==
=== Heats ===
Qualification: First 2 in each heat (Q) and the next fastest 6 (q) advance to the Semifinals.

Rank	Heat	Athlete	Nationality	Time	Note
1	1	Marcell Jacobs	Italy	6.59	Q
2	3	Andrew Robertson	Great Britain	6.60	Q, SB
3	9	Kevin Kranz	Germany	6.61	Q
4	8	Ján Volko	Slovakia	6.63	Q
5	5	Kojo Musah	Denmark	6.65	Q
6	9	Oleksandr Sokolov	Ukraine	6.66	Q
7	8	Mouhamadou Fall	France	6.66	Q
8	6	Karl Erik Nazarov	Estonia	6.67	Q
9	6	Julian Wagner	Germany	6.67	Q
10	3	Bence Boros	Hungary	6.67	Q
11	7	Konstadinos Zikos	Greece	6.67	Q
12	7	Kobe Vleminckx	Belgium	6.67	Q
13	4	Stanislav Kovalenko	Ukraine	6.67	Q, PB
14	4	Carlos Nascimento	Portugal	6.68	Q
14	9	Przemysław Słowikowski	Poland	6.68	q
16	2	Remigiusz Olszewski	Poland	6.68	Q
17	5	Harry Aikines-Aryeetey	Great Britain	6.68	Q
18	8	Kayhan Özer	Turkey	6.69	q
19	6	Dominik Kopeć	Poland	6.69	q
20	1	Oliver Bromby	Great Britain	6.70	Q
21	5	Amaury Golitin	France	6.70	q
22	3	Chituru Ali	Italy	6.71	q
23	2	Erik Kostrytsya	Ukraine	6.71	Q, SB
24	4	Michael Pohl	Germany	6.72	q
25	2	Luca Lai	Italy	6.73	
26	5	Mathias Hove Johansen	Norway	6.73	PB
27	6	Pascal Mancini	Switzerland	6.73	
28	4	William Reais	Switzerland	6.74	
29	1	Ioánnis Nifadópoulos	Greece	6.74	SB
30	2	Samuli Samuelsson	Finland	6.75	
31	1	Daniel Rodríguez	Spain	6.75	
32	1	Jan Veleba	Czech Republic	6.75	
32	7	Aleksa Kijanović	Serbia	6.75	
34	5	Leon Reid	Ireland	6.75	
35	6	Jacob Vaula	Norway	6.75	
36	6	Gaylord Kuba Di-Vita	Belgium	6.76	
37	3	Zdeněk Stromšík	Czech Republic	6.77	
38	2	Markus Fuchs	Austria	6.77	
39	5	Samuel Purola	Finland	6.77	
40	4	Tamás Máté	Hungary	6.78	
41	9	Oğuz Uyar	Turkey	6.78	
42	9	Alexander Donigian	Armenia	6.78	
43	1	Yury Zabalotny	Belarus	6.79	
44	8	Israel Olatunde	Ireland	6.79	
45	3	Tomáš Matuščák	Slovakia	6.79	
46	8	Riku Illukka	Finland	6.79	
47	2	Gediminas Truskauskas	Lithuania	6.80	
48	7	Dominik Illovszky	Hungary	6.80	
48	9	Even Meinseth	Norway	6.80	
50	4	Odain Rose	Sweden	6.81	
51	6	Emil Mader Kjaer	Denmark	6.82	
52	7	Štepán Hampl	Czech Republic	6.83	
53	8	Simon Hansen	Denmark	6.83	
54	4	Maksim Bohdan	Belarus	6.84	
55	5	Denis Dimitrov	Bulgaria	6.85	
56	3	Sergio López	Spain	6.86	
57	2	Umut Uysal	Turkey	6.86	
58	3	Dzianis Bliznets	Belarus	6.88	
59	9	Dean Adams	Ireland	6.89	
60	8	Vesselin Jivkov	Bulgaria	6.90	
61	3	Dorian Keletela	ART	6.91	
62	8	Francesco Sansovini	San Marino	6.92	
63	7	Petre Rezmives	Romania	6.99	
	7	Joris van Gool	Netherlands	DSQ	R162.8
	1	Tilen Ovniček	Slovenia	DNS	

=== Semifinals ===
Qualification: First 2 in each heat (Q) and the next 2 fastest (q) advance to the Final.

Rank	Heat	Athlete	Nationality	Time	Note
1	2	Marcell Jacobs	Italy	6.56	Q
2	3	Ján Volko	Slovakia	6.57	Q, SB
3	3	Kevin Kranz	Germany	6.58	Q
4	1	Andrew Robertson	Great Britain	6.59	Q, SB
5	3	Remigiusz Olszewski	Poland	6.60	q
6	2	Karl Erik Nazarov	Estonia	6.62	Q, NR
7	3	Carlos Nascimento	Portugal	6.62	q, PB
8	1	Kojo Musah	Denmark	6.63	Q
9	1	Mouhamadou Fall	France	6.64	
10	3	Amaury Golitin	France	6.64	
11	2	Oliver Bromby	Great Britain	6.64	SB
12	2	Konstadinos Zikos	Greece	6.67	
12	3	Harry Aikines-Aryeetey	Great Britain	6.67	=SB
14	1	Michael Pohl	Germany	6.67	
15	3	Oleksandr Sokolov	Ukraine	6.67	
16	1	Kobe Vleminckx	Belgium	6.68	
17	2	Przemysław Słowikowski	Poland	6.68	
18	3	Chituru Ali	Italy	6.68	PB
19	2	Julian Wagner	Germany	6.68	
20	1	Bence Boros	Hungary	6.69	
21	1	Stanislav Kovalenko	Ukraine	6.69	
22	2	Kayhan Özer	Turkey	6.69	
23	1	Dominik Kopeć	Poland	6.69	
24	2	Erik Kostrytsya	Ukraine	6.72	

=== Final ===
Rank	Lane	Athlete	Nationality	Time	Note
1st place, gold medalist(s)	6	Marcell Jacobs	Italy	6.47	WL, NR
2nd place, silver medalist(s)	5	Kevin Kranz	Germany	6.60	
3rd place, bronze medalist(s)	4	Ján Volko	Slovakia	6.61	
4	3	Andrew Robertson	Great Britain	6.63	
5	2	Carlos Nascimento	Portugal	6.65	
6	1	Remigiusz Olszewski	Poland	6.66	
7	8	Karl Erik Nazarov	Estonia	6.67	
8	7	Kojo Musah	Denmark	6.68	
