= Zafer =

Zafer, Dhafer or Dhaffer (Arabic: ظافر ẓāfir) is an Arabic masculine given name meaning "victorious, Conqueror, Triumphant or Victor". It is used in Arabic-speaking countries, the Balkans, and many countries that have come into contact with Islamic culture. In Turkey it is used as a unisex given name. The word is also used as a surname.

Notable people with the name include:

== Given name ==
=== Dhafer, Dhaffer ===
- Dhafer Youssef (born 1967), Tunisian composer
- Dhaffer L'Abidine (born 1972), Tunisian actor

=== First name ===
- Zafer Hanım, Turkish novelist
- Zafer Algöz (born 1961), Turkish actor
- Zafer Biryol (born 1976), Turkish football player
- Zafer Çağlayan (born 1957), Turkish politician
- Zafer Çevik (born 1984), Turkish football player
- Zafer Ergin (born 1942), Turkish actor
- Zafer Görgen (born 2000), Turkish football player
- Zafer Gözet (born 1965), Norwegian politician of Turkish origin
- Zafer İlken, Turkish educator
- Zafer Kalaycıoğlu (born 1965), Turkish basketball coach
- Zafer Kılıçkan (born 1973), Turkish football player
- Zafer Kızılkaya (born 1969), Turkish marine advocate and engineer
- Zafer al-Masri (1940–1986), Nablus mayor
- Zafer Önen (1921–2013), Turkish actor
- Zafer Özgültekin (born 1975), Turkish football player
- Zafer Şakar (born 1985), Turkish football player
- Zafer Şenocak (born 1961), German writer of Turkish origin
- Zafer Yelen (born 1986), German football player of Turkish origin
- Zafer Habasch (born 1987), German musician

=== Middle name ===
- Emre Zafer Barnes (born 1988), Jamaican-Turkish sprinter

== Surname ==
- Casper Zafer (born 1974), English actor
- David Zafer (1934–2019), Canadian violinist and pedagogue
- Haydar Zafer (1916–1994), Turkish wrestler
- Işıl Zafer (born 2004), Turkish female taekwondo practitioner
- Rahim Zafer (born 1971), Turkish football player

== See also ==
- Zafer (disambiguation)
- Zafar (disambiguation)
