= Zafarabad =

Zafarabad may refer to:

- Jafarabad, Uttar Pradesh, India
  - Zafarabad Junction railway station
- Zafarabad, alternate name of Jafarabad, Borujerd, in Iran
- Zafarabad, alternate name of Javadabad, Delfan, in Iran
- Zafarabad, Fars, a village in Fars Province, Iran
- Zafarabad, Hamadan, a village in Hamadan Province, Iran
- Zafarabad, alternate name of Khvajeh Hoseyni, Hamadan Province, Iran
- Zafarabad, Kohgiluyeh and Boyer-Ahmad
- Zafarabad, Dehgolan, Kurdistan Province, Iran
- Zafarabad, Divandarreh, Kurdistan Province, Iran
- Zafarabad, Delfan, a village in Lorestan Province, Iran
- Zafarabad, Kakavand, a village in Lorestan Province, Iran
- Zafarabad, North Khorasan, a village in North Khorasan Province, Iran

== See also ==
- Zafarobod (disambiguation)
- Zafar (disambiguation)
