= 2022 European Athletics Championships – Men's 100 metres =

Men's 100 metres at the 2022 European Athletics Championships
- Venue: Olympiastadion
- Location: Munich
- Dates: 15 August (round 1); 16 August (semifinals & final)
- Competitors: 34 from 19 nations
- Winning time: 9.95

Medalists
gold medal	Marcell Jacobs	Italy
silver medal	Zharnel Hughes	Great Britain
bronze medal	Jeremiah Azu	Great Britain

The men's 100 metres at the 2022 European Athletics Championships took place at the Olympiastadion on 15 and 16 August.

== Records ==
Standing records prior to the 2022 European Athletics Championships
World record	Usain Bolt (JAM)	9.58	Berlin, Germany	16 August 2009
European record	Marcell Jacobs (ITA)	9.80	Tokyo, Japan	1 August 2021
Championship record	Zharnel Hughes (GBR)	9.95	Berlin, Germany	7 August 2018
World Leading	Fred Kerley (USA)	9.76	Eugene, Oregon, United States	24 June 2022
Europe Leading	Reece Prescod (GBR)	9.93	Ostrava, Czech Republic	31 May 2022

== Schedule ==
Date	Time	Round
15 August 2022	10:40	Round 1
16 August 2022	20:05	Semifinals
16 August 2022	22:15	Final

All times are local times (UTC+2)

== Results ==
=== Round 1 ===
First 3 in each heat (Q) and the next 1 fastest (q) advance to the Semifinals. The 14 highest ranked athletes received a bye into the semi-finals

Wind:
Heat 1: +0.7 m/s, Heat 2: 0.0 m/s, Heat 3: +0.1 m/s

Rank	Heat	Lane	Name	Nationality	Time	Note
1	3	8	Israel Olatunde	Ireland	10.19	Q, PB
2	1	6	Ján Volko	Slovakia	10.22	Q, SB
3	2	4	Pascal Mancini	Switzerland	10.24	Q
4	3	7	Dominik Kopeć	Poland	10.30	Q
5	1	4	Henrik Larsson	Sweden	10.31	Q
6	2	8	Kayhan Özer	Turkey	10.31	Q
7	3	4	Emre Zafer Barnes	Turkey	10.33	Q
8	3	6	Carlos Nascimento	Portugal	10.33	q
9	2	3	Kobe Vleminckx	Belgium	10.34	Q
9	3	2	Frederik Schou-Nielsen	Denmark	10.34	
11	1	5	Przemysław Słowikowski	Poland	10.35	Q
12	2	5	Samuli Samuelsson	Finland	10.39	
13	1	7	Karl Erik Nazarov	Estonia	10.39	
14	1	3	Joris van Gool	Netherlands	10.45	
15	2	6	Adrian Brzeziński	Poland	10.46	
16	3	5	Zdeněk Stromšík	Czech Republic	10.60	
17	2	7	Francesco Sansovini	San Marino	10.82	
	1	8	Kojo Musah	Denmark	DNF	
	3	3	Sergio López	Spain	DQ	

=== Semifinals ===
The ten qualifiers from round 1 are joined by the fourteen highest ranked athletes who received a bye.

First 2 in each semifinal (Q) and the next 2 fastest (q) advance to the Final.

Wind: SF 1: 0.0 m/s, SF 2: +0.2 m/s, SF 3: +0.2 m/s

Rank	Heat	Lane	Name	Nationality	Time	Note
1	3	4	Marcell Jacobs	Italy	10.00	Q, SB
2	1	5	Zharnel Hughes	Great Britain	10.03	Q
3	2	6	Reece Prescod	Great Britain	10.10	Q
4	2	5	Chituru Ali	Italy	10.12	Q, PB
5	2	1	Ján Volko	Slovakia	10.13	q, =NR
6	2	7	Mouhamadou Fall	France	10.16	q
7	1	3	Jeremiah Azu	Great Britain	10.17	Q
8	1	4	Jimmy Vicaut	France	10.18	
9	1	6	Lucas Ansah-Peprah	Germany	10.19	
10	2	3	Owen Ansah	Germany	10.20	
11	3	7	Israel Olatunde	Ireland	10.20	Q
12	3	5	Méba-Mickaël Zeze	France	10.21	
13	3	3	Julian Wagner	Germany	10.21	
14	1	8	Pascal Mancini	Switzerland	10.23	
15	2	8	Dominik Kopeć	Poland	10.23	
16	3	1	Przemysław Słowikowski	Poland	10.24	SB
17	3	6	Ojie Edoburun	Great Britain	10.25	
18	1	1	Henrik Larsson	Sweden	10.28	
19	3	2	Kobe Vleminckx	Belgium	10.34	
20	1	2	Kayhan Özer	Turkey	10.34	
21	2	2	Carlos Nascimento	Portugal	10.40	
22	3	8	Emre Zafer Barnes	Turkey	10.41	
23	1	7	Markus Fuchs	Austria	10.42	
	2	4	Jak Ali Harvey	Turkey	DQ	F1

=== Final ===
Rank	Lane	Name	Nationality	Time	Note
1st place, gold medalist(s)	6	Marcell Jacobs	Italy	9.95	=CR
2nd place, silver medalist(s)	3	Zharnel Hughes	Great Britain	9.99	
3rd place, bronze medalist(s)	8	Jeremiah Azu	Great Britain	10.13	PB
4	1	Ján Volko	Slovakia	10.16	
5	2	Mouhamadou Fall	France	10.17	
6	7	Israel Olatunde	Ireland	10.17	NR
7	5	Reece Prescod	Great Britain	10.18	
8	4	Chituru Ali	Italy	10.28	
