= 2019 European Athletics Indoor Championships – Men's 60 metres =

The men's 60 metres event at the 2019 European Athletics Indoor Championships was held on 2 March 2019 at 10:25 (heats), at 19:20 (semifinals) and 20:50 (final) local time.

== Medalists ==
Gold	Silver	Bronze
Ján Volko; Slovakia	Emre Zafer Barnes; Turkey	Joris van Gool; Netherlands

== Records ==
Standing records prior to the 2019 European Athletics Indoor Championships
World record	Christian Coleman (USA)	6.34	Albuquerque, United States	18 February 2018
European record	Dwain Chambers (GBR)	6.42	Turin, Italy	7 March 2009
Championship record	Dwain Chambers (GBR)	6.42	Turin, Italy	7 March 2009
World Leading	Su Bingtian (CHN)	6.47	Birmingham, United Kingdom	16 February 2019
European Leading	Reece Prescod (GBR)	6.53	Berlin, Germany	1 February 2019

== Results ==
=== Heats ===
Qualification: First 3 in each heat (Q) and the next 6 fastest (q) advance to the Semi-Finals.

Rank	Heat	Athlete	Nationality	Time	Note
1	5	Konstadinos Zikos	Greece	6.66	Q
2	3	Ojie Edoburun	Great Britain	6.67	Q
3	5	Richard Kilty	Great Britain	6.68	Q
4	1	Emre Zafer Barnes	Turkey	6.69	Q
5	4	Ján Volko	Slovakia	6.69	Q
6	3	Kevin Kranz	Germany	6.70	Q
7	6	Joris van Gool	Netherlands	6.71	Q
8	4	Remigiusz Olszewski	Poland	6.72	Q
8	5	Carlos Nascimento	Portugal	6.72	Q
10	6	Henrik Larsson	Sweden	6.72	Q
11	2	Aykut Ay	Turkey	6.73	Q, SB
12	4	Ancuiam Lopes	Portugal	6.74	Q
13	4	Amaury Golitin	France	6.74	q
14	1	Markus Fuchs	Austria	6.75	Q
14	6	Samuel Purola	Finland	6.75	Q
16	5	Oleksandr Sokolov	Ukraine	6.75	q
17	1	Silvan Wicki	Switzerland	6.75	Q
18	6	Sergio López	Spain	6.76	q
19	2	Austin Hamilton	Sweden	6.76	Q
20	2	Petre Rezmives	Romania	6.77	Q
21	3	Zdeněk Stromšík	Czech Republic	6.77	Q
22	2	Šimon Bujna	Slovakia	6.78	q
22	2	Marvin René	France	6.78	q
24	3	Sylvain Chuard	Switzerland	6.78	q
25	5	Amund Høie Sjursen	Norway	6.79	
26	2	Panayiotis Trivizas	Greece	6.80	
27	2	Aleksa Kijanović	Serbia	6.81	
27	5	Aitor Same Ekobo	Spain	6.81	
29	5	Kojo Musah	Denmark	6.81	
30	1	Vasyl Makukh	Ukraine	6.84	
31	6	Volodymyr Suprun	Ukraine	6.87	
32	4	Kayhan Özer	Turkey	6.87	
33	3	Dániel Szabó	Hungary	6.88	
33	4	Odain Rose	Sweden	6.88	
35	4	Ionut Andrei Neagoe	Romania	6.88	
36	3	Andreas Hadjitheoris	Cyprus	6.90	
37	3	Efthimios Steryioulis	Greece	6.91	
38	1	Alexandru Terpezan	Romania	6.92	
39	6	Denis Dimitrov	Bulgaria	6.95	
40	1	Joseph Ojewumi	Ireland	6.97	
41	1	Daniel Ambros	Spain	6.99	
42	2	Omar El Aida Chaffey	Malta	7.05	
43	6	Festus Asante	Denmark	7.05	
44	6	Francesco Molinari	San Marino	7.06	
	5	Zvonimir Ivašković	Croatia	DQ	R162.8

=== Semifinals ===
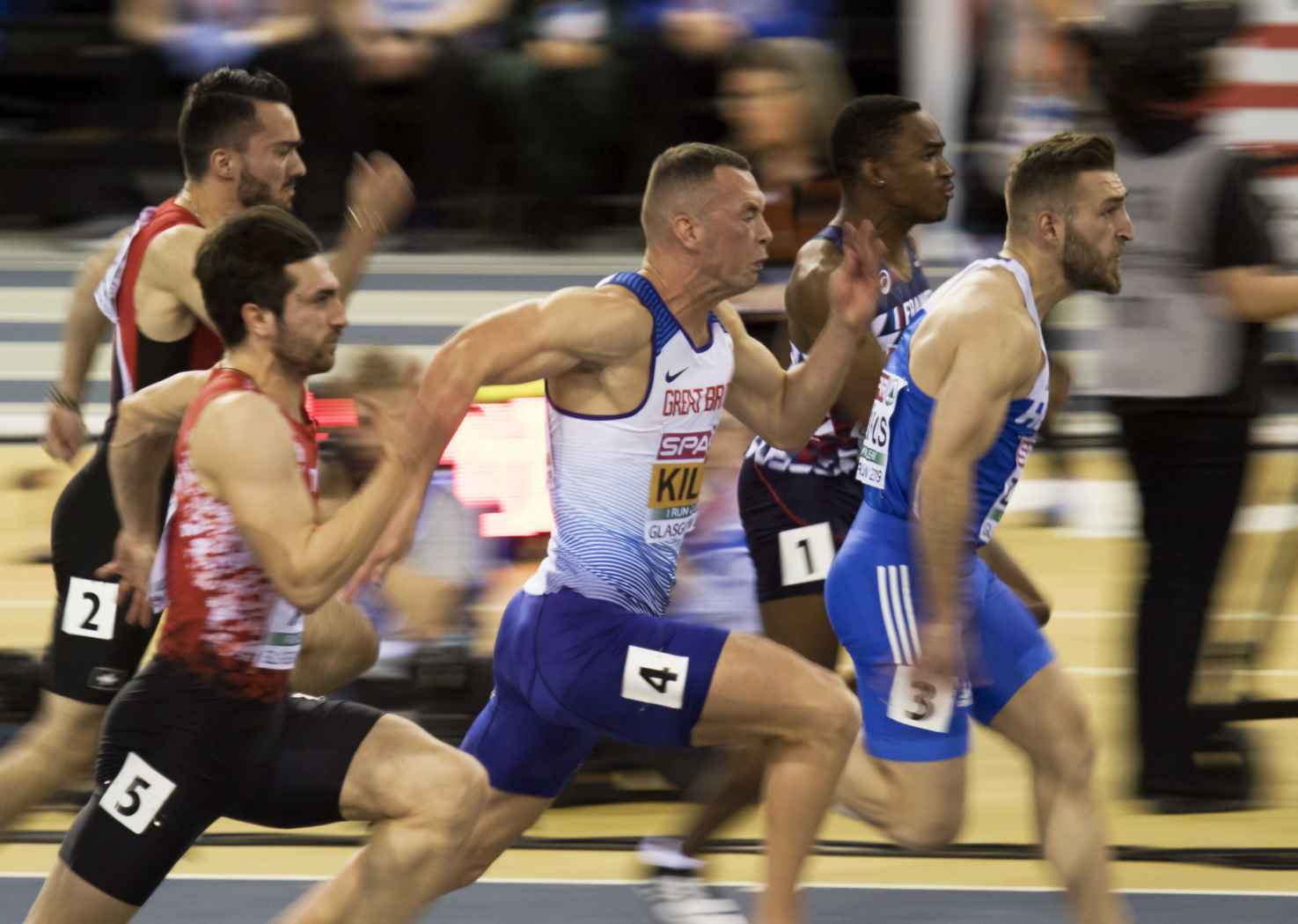
Semifinal 1

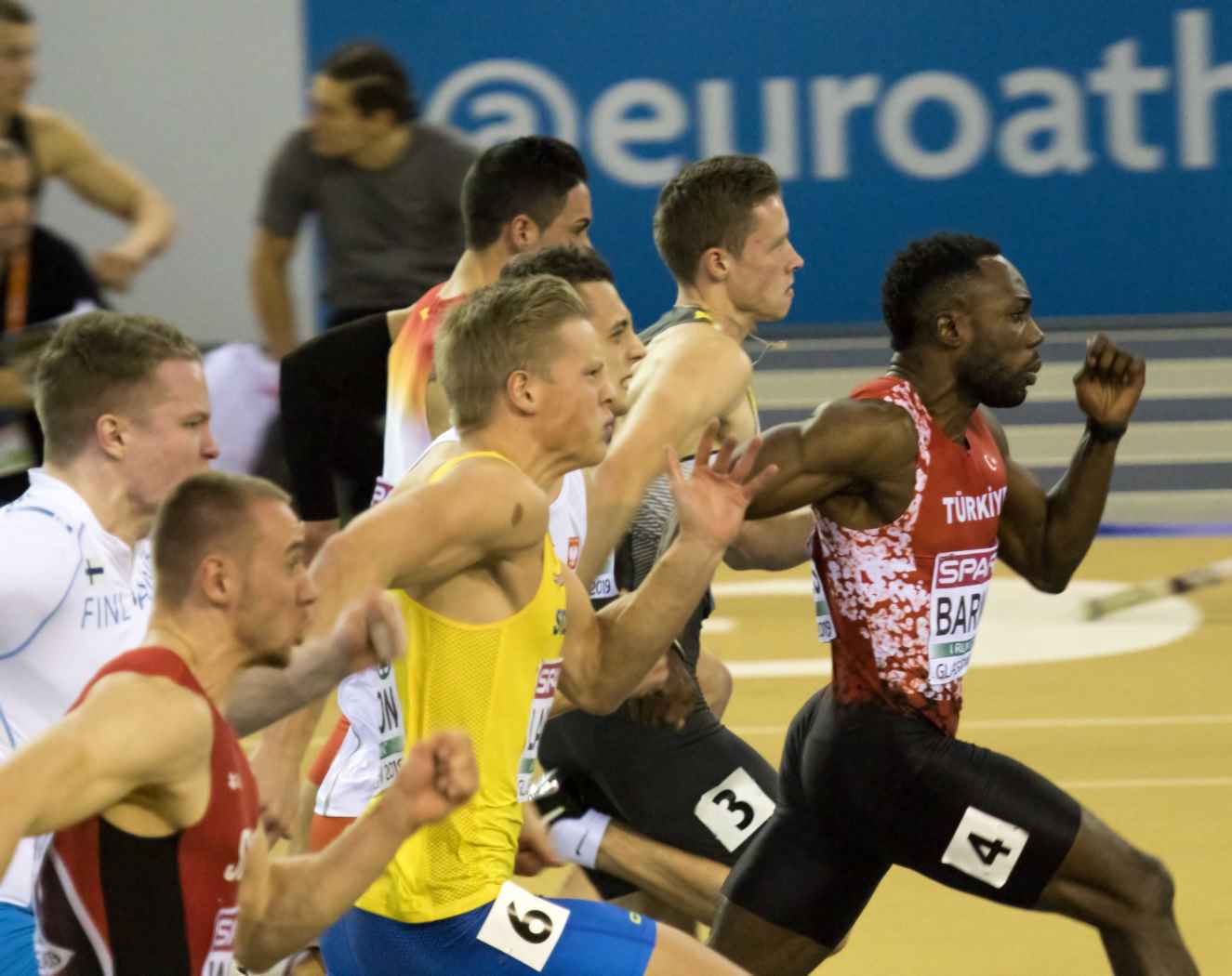
Semifinal 3

Qualification: First 2 in each heat (Q) and the next 2 fastest (q) advance to the Final.

Rank	Heat	Athlete	Nationality	Time	Note
1	2	Ján Volko	Slovakia	6.61	Q
2	2	Joris van Gool	Netherlands	6.62	Q, PB
3	2	Ojie Edoburun	Great Britain	6.63	q, SB
4	1	Konstadinos Zikos	Greece	6.64	Q
5	1	Richard Kilty	Great Britain	6.64	Q
6	3	Emre Zafer Barnes	Turkey	6.65	Q
7	1	Amaury Golitin	France	6.67	q
8	3	Kevin Kranz	Germany	6.67	Q
9	3	Henrik Larsson	Sweden	6.69	
10	2	Marvin René	France	6.71	
11	2	Markus Fuchs	Austria	6.71	
11	3	Sergio López	Spain	6.71	
13	1	Carlos Nascimento	Portugal	6.71	
14	3	Remigiusz Olszewski	Poland	6.72	
15	1	Aykut Ay	Turkey	6.73	=SB
16	3	Samuel Purola	Finland	6.74	
17	1	Austin Hamilton	Sweden	6.75	
18	3	Silvan Wicki	Switzerland	6.76	
19	1	Zdeněk Stromšík	Czech Republic	6.78	
20	2	Ancuiam Lopes	Portugal	6.79	
21	2	Petre Rezmives	Romania	6.81	
22	1	Sylvain Chuard	Switzerland	6.82	
23	3	Šimon Bujna	Slovakia	6.86	
	2	Oleksandr Sokolov	Ukraine	DNS	

=== Final ===
Rank	Lane	Athlete	Nationality	Time	Note
1st place, gold medalist(s)	5	Ján Volko	Slovakia	6.60	
2nd place, silver medalist(s)	4	Emre Zafer Barnes	Turkey	6.61	
3rd place, bronze medalist(s)	3	Joris van Gool	Netherlands	6.62	=PB
4	7	Richard Kilty	Great Britain	6.66	
5	6	Konstadinos Zikos	Greece	6.67	
6	2	Amaury Golitin	France	6.67	
7	1	Ojie Edoburun	Great Britain	6.67	
8	8	Kevin Kranz	Germany	6.73	
