= Zafer (disambiguation) =

Zafer is a Turkish given name and a surname.

Zafer may also refer to:

- Zafer (newspaper), a daily newspaper in Turkey in the 1950s
- Zafer, Ulus, village in Bartın, Turkey
- Zafer Airport, regional airport in Turkey
- Zafer Partisi, Turkish political party known as Victory Party (Turkey)
- Zafer Square, square in Ankara, Turkey
- Zafer Stadı, multi-purpose stadium in Guzelyurt, Northern Cyprus

== See also ==
- Zafar (disambiguation)
