= Zikos =

Zikos is a given name and surname. Notable people with the name include:

given name;

- Zikos Chua (born 2002), Singaporean footballer

surname;

- Akis Zikos (born 1974), Greek footballer
- Konstadinos Zikos (born 1998), Greek sprinter
