= 2019 European Athletics U23 Championships – Men's 100 metres =

The men's 100 metres event at the 2019 European Athletics U23 Championships was held in Gävle, Sweden, at Gavlehov Stadium Park on 11 and 12 July.

== Records ==
Prior to the competition, the records were as follows:

European U23 record	Christophe Lemaitre (FRA)	9.92	Albi, France	29 July 2011
Championship U23 record	Simeon Williamson (GBR)	10.10	Debrecen, Hungary	13 July 2007

== Results ==
=== Heats ===
Qualification rule: First 3 (Q) and the next 4 fastest (q) qualified for the semifinals.

Wind:
Heat 1: -2.1 m/s, Heat 2: -1.9 m/s, Heat 3: -1.0 m/s, Heat 4: -2.4 m/s

Rank	Heat	Name	Nationality	Time	Notes
1	3	Henrik Larsson	Sweden	10.45	Q
2	3	Dominic Ashwell	Great Britain	10.46	Q
3	2	Marvin Schulte	Germany	10.57	Q
4	3	Oleksandr Sokolov	Ukraine	10.66	Q
5	3	Kayhan Özer	Turkey	10.67	q
6	2	Amaury Golitin	France	10.68	Q
7	4	Kevin Kranz	Germany	10.71	Q
8	3	Sotirios Garagganis	Greece	10.73	q
9	2	Frederico Curvelo	Portugal	10.77	Q
10	2	Konstadinos Zikos	Greece	10.79	q
11	4	Austin Hamilton	Sweden	10.81	Q
12	1	Oliver Bromby	Great Britain	10.83	Q
12	3	Łukasz Żak	Poland	10.83	q
14	4	Joris van Gool	Netherlands	10.83	Q
15	2	Maksim Hrabarenka	Belarus	10.84	
16	2	Bartosz Siudek	Poland	10.85	
17	4	Yury Zabalotny	Belarus	10.87	
18	4	Mathias Hove Johansen	Norway	10.90	
19	1	Andrei Alexandru Zlatan	Italy	10.91	Q
20	1	Aleksa Kijanović	Serbia	10.95	Q
21	4	Dániel Szabó	Hungary	10.96	
22	1	Joshua Hartmann	Germany	10.98	
23	1	Štepan Hámpl	Czech Republic	10.99	
24	1	Albert Ranning	Denmark	11.00	
25	4	Petre Rezmives	Romania	11.09	
26	2	Philipp Frommelt	Liechtenstein	11.67	
	1	Rafael Jorge	Portugal	DQ	

=== Semifinals ===
12 July Qualification rule: First 3 (Q) and the next 2 fastest (q) qualified for the final.

Wind:
Heat 1: -1.2 m/s, Heat 2: -1.4 m/s

Rank	Heat	Name	Nationality	Time	Notes
1	1	Marvin Schulte	Germany	10.49	Q
2	1	Oliver Bromby	Great Britain	10.49	Q
3	2	Henrik Larsson	Sweden	10.50	Q
4	1	Joris van Gool	Netherlands	10.53	Q
5	1	Amaury Golitin	France	10.55	q
6	2	Kevin Kranz	Germany	10.56	Q
7	2	Dominic Ashwell	Great Britain	10.63	Q
8	1	Austin Hamilton	Sweden	10.74	q
9	1	Kayhan Özer	Turkey	10.75	
10	2	Andrei Alexandru Zlatan	Italy	10.75	
11	2	Oleksandr Sokolov	Ukraine	10.78	
12	1	Frederico Curvelo	Portugal	10.79	
13	2	Sotirios Garagganis	Greece	10.80	
14	1	Konstadinos Zikos	Greece	10.87	
15	2	Łukasz Żak	Poland	10.92	
16	2	Aleksa Kijanović	Serbia	11.67	

=== Final ===
12 July

Wind: +2.2 m/s

Rank	Lane	Name	Nationality	Time	Notes
1st place, gold medalist(s)	5	Henrik Larsson	Sweden	10.23	
2nd place, silver medalist(s)	6	Oliver Bromby	Great Britain	10.24	
3rd place, bronze medalist(s)	8	Joris van Gool	Netherlands	10.27	
4	4	Kevin Kranz	Germany	10.28	
5	3	Marvin Schulte	Germany	10.30	
6	7	Dominic Ashwell	Great Britain	10.37	
7	2	Amaury Golitin	France	10.38	
8	1	Austin Hamilton	Sweden	14.70	
