= Ján Volko =

Slovak sprinter

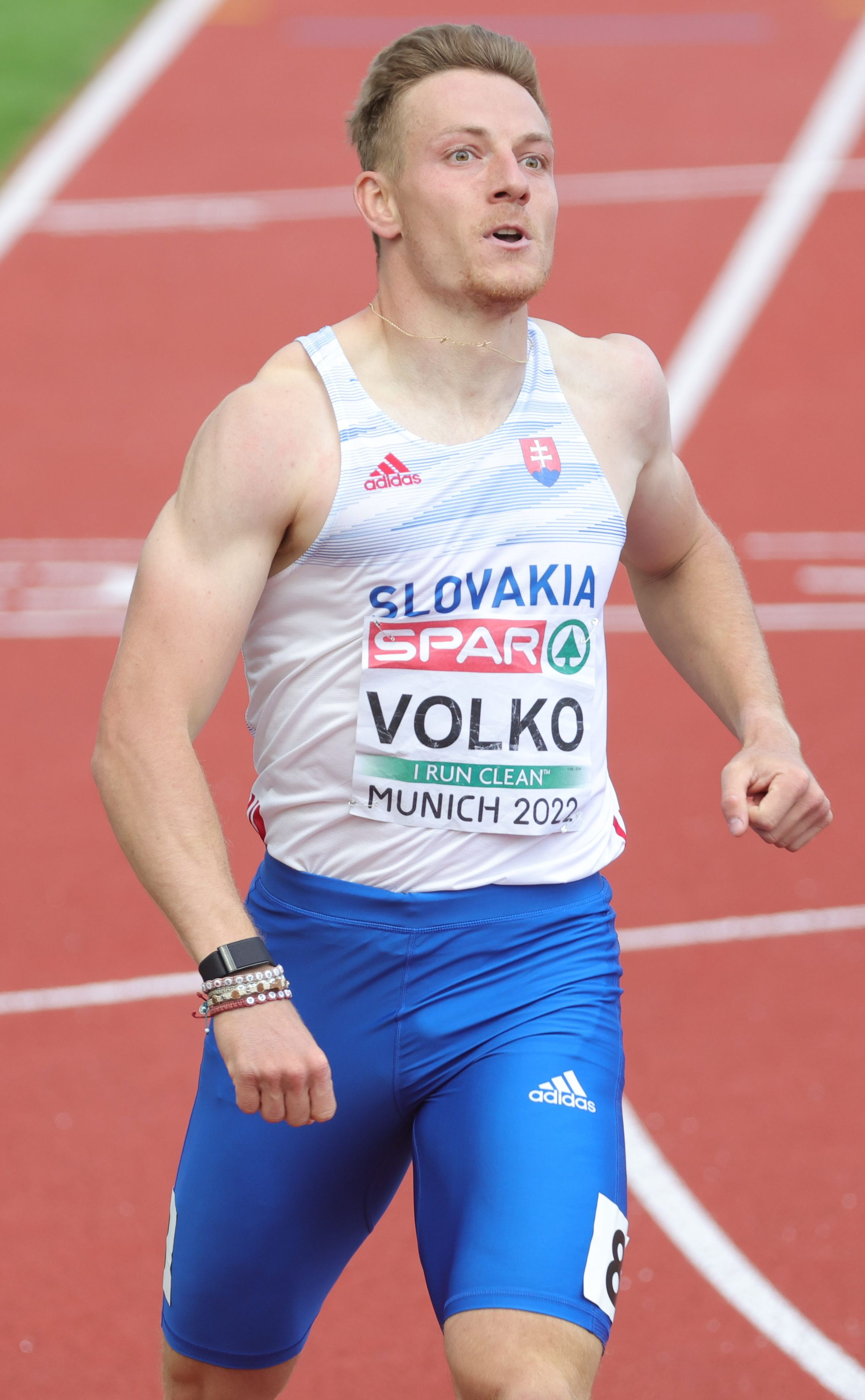
- Volko in 2022

Personal information
- Born: 2 November 1996 (age 29) Bratislava, Slovakia
- Height: 1.79 m (5 ft 10 in)
- Weight: 75 kg (165 lb)

Sport
- Sport: Athletics
- Events: 60 m, 100 m, 200 m
- Club: BK HNTN Bratislava
- Coached by: Naďa Bendová, Róbert Kresťanko
Medal record
Men's athletics
Representing Slovakia
European Indoor Championships
| Gold medal – first place | 2019 Glasgow | 60 m |
| Silver medal – second place | 2017 Belgrade | 60 m |
| Bronze medal – third place | 2021 Toruń | 60 m |
European Games
| Gold medal – first place | 2015 Baku | Mixed team |
| Silver medal – second place | 2019 Minsk | 100 m |
| Bronze medal – third place | 2023 Kraków-Małopolska | 200 m |
World University Games
| Bronze medal – third place | 2017 Taipei | 200 m |

Ján Volko (born 2 November 1996) is a Slovak sprinter. He competed in the 60 metres at the 2016 IAAF World Indoor Championships.

== Career ==
Volko started racing in the club BK HNT N Bratislava and also hosted in the club AK Olomouc in the Czech athletics extra league. He has been racing for the club Naša atletika since 2019.

On 4 March 2017, Volko won a silver medal in the 60 meters at the 2017 European Athletics Indoor Championships, setting a new record with a time of 6.58 seconds and becoming the first Slovak representative to reach the final.

At the 2019 European Athletics Indoor Championships, Volko won the gold medal in the 60m run on 2 March 2019. On 6 March 2021, he won a bronze medal in the 60-meter race at the 2021 European Indoor Championships in Toruń (Poland).

== Personal life ==
Volko is a Christian. In 2020, he became the cover of the game Athletics Mania by Slovak video game developer PowerPlay Studio.

== Competition record ==
| Year | Competition | Venue | Position | Event | Notes |
Representing Slovakia
| 2015 | European Indoor Championships | Prague, Czech Republic | 30th (h) | 60 m | 6.86 |
| 2015 | European Junior Championships | Eskilstuna, Sweden | 10th (sf) | 100 m | 10.84 |
| 2015 | European Junior Championships | Eskilstuna, Sweden | 9th (h) | 200 m | 21.68 |
| 2015 | European Games | Baku, Azerbaijan | 1st | 200 m | 21.08 |
| 2016 | World Indoor Championships | Portland, United States | 35th (h) | 60 m | 6.80 |
| 2016 | European Championships | Amsterdam, Netherlands | 21st (sf) | 100 m | 10.43 |
| 2016 | European Championships | Amsterdam, Netherlands | 20th (sf) | 200 m | 21.28 |
| 2017 | European Indoor Championships | Belgrade, Serbia | 2nd | 60 m | 6.58 NR |
| 2017 | European U23 Championships | Bydgoszcz, Poland | 2nd | 100 m | 10.18 |
| 2017 | European U23 Championships | Bydgoszcz, Poland | 1st | 200 m | 20.33 CR NR |
| 2017 | World Championships | London, United Kingdom | 28th (h) | 100 m | 10.25 |
| 2017 | World Championships | London, United Kingdom | 15th (sf) | 200 m | 20.61 |
| 2017 | Universiade | Taipei, Taiwan | 5th | 100 m | 10.30 |
| 2017 | Universiade | Taipei, Taiwan | 3rd | 200 m | 20.99 |
| 2017 | Universiade | Taipei, Taiwan | 13th (h) | 4 × 100 m relay | 40.69 |
| 2018 | World Indoor Championships | Birmingham, United Kingdom | 6th | 60 m | 6.59 |
| 2018 | European Championships | Berlin, Germany | 13th (sf) | 100 m | 10.31 |
| 2018 | European Championships | Berlin, Germany | 13th (sf) | 200 m | 20.58 |
| 2019 | European Indoor Championships | Glasgow, Scotland | 1st | 60 m | 6.60 |
| 2019 | European Games | Minsk, Belarus | 2nd | 100 m | 10.38 |
| 2019 | Universiade | Naples, Italy | 4th | 100 m | 10.36 |
| 2019 | Universiade | Naples, Italy | 5th | 200 m | 20.66 |
| 2021 | European Indoor Championships | Toruň, Poland | 3rd | 60 m | 6.61 |
| 2021 | Olympic Games | Tokyo, Japan | 46th (h) | 100 m | 10.40 |
| 2021 | Olympic Games | Tokyo, Japan | 42nd (h) | 200 m | 21.21 |
| 2022 | World Indoor Championships | Belgrade, Serbia | 25th (h) | 60 m | 6.66 |
| 2022 | European Championships | Munich, Germany | 4th | 100 m | 10.16 |
| 2022 | European Championships | Munich, Germany | 8th (sf) | 200 m | 20.39 |
| 2023 | European Indoor Championships | Istanbul, Turkey | 5th | 60 m | 6.57 |
| 2023 | World University Games | Chengdu, China | 4th | 200 m | 20.66 |
| 2023 | World Championships | Budapest, Hungary | 36th (h) | 100 m | 10.25 |
| 2023 | World Championships | Budapest, Hungary | 32nd (h) | 200 m | 20.69 |
| 2024 | World Indoor Championships | Glasgow, United Kingdom | 13th (sf) | 60 m | 6.60 |
| 2024 | European Championships | Rome, Italy | 18th (sf) | 100 m | 10.38 |
| 2024 | European Championships | Rome, Italy | 20th (h) | 200 m | 21.09 |
| 2025 | European Indoor Championships | Apeldoorn, Netherlands | 27th (h) | 60 m | 6.72 |
| 2025 | World Indoor Championships | Nanjing, China | 42nd (h) | 60 m | 6.87 |
| 2026 | European Championships | Birmingham, United Kingdom | 22nd (sf) | 100 m | 10.55 |
| 2026 | European Championships | Birmingham, United Kingdom | 23rd (h) | 200 m | 21.45 |

== Records ==
Outdoor

- 100 metres – 10.13 NR (+1.1 m/s, Šamorín 2018; +0.2 m/s, Munich 2022)
- 200 metres – 20.24 (+1.6 m/s, Trnava 2018)

Indoor

- 60 metres – 6.55 NR (Madrid 2020)
- 200 metres – 20.99 NR (Metz 2021)
- 400 metres – 49.56 (Bratislava 2016)
