= Amaury Golitin =

French sprinter

Personal information
- Born: 28 January 1997 (age 29) Cayenne, French Guiana

Sport
- Sport: Athletics
- Event: 100 metres
- Club: Ec Orleans Cercle Jules Ferry
- Coached by: Honsai Fabrice (–2017; Dimitri Demonière (2017–)

Amaury Golitin (born 28 January 1997) is a French sprinter. He won a bronze medal at the 2015 European Junior Championships in Eskilstuna. As a senior, he finished sixth in the 60 metres at the 2019 European Indoor Championships in Glasgow.

In 2023, Golitin was issued with a four-year ban set to expire in June 2026 for anti-doping rule violations relating to whereabouts failures and tampering associated with submitting false documents.

== International competitions ==
Year	Competition	Venue	Position	Event	Notes
Representing France
2015	European Junior Championships	Eskilstuna, Sweden	14th (sf)	100 m	10.80
2015	European Junior Championships	Eskilstuna, Sweden	3rd	4 × 100 m relay	40.02
2016	World U20 Championships	Bydgoszcz, Poland	17th (sf)	100 m	10.54
2017	European U23 Championships	Bydgoszcz, Poland	14th (sf)	100 m	10.52
2017	European U23 Championships	Bydgoszcz, Poland	4th	4 × 100 m relay	39.86
2018	Mediterranean U23 Championships	Jesolo, Italy	1st	100 m	10.07
2018	Mediterranean U23 Championships	Jesolo, Italy	1st	4 × 400 m relay	39.72
2018	Mediterranean Games	Tarragona, Spain	7th (h)	100 m	10.67
2018	European Championships	Berlin, Germany	24th (sf)	100 m	10.55
2019	European Indoor Championships	Glasgow, United Kingdom	6th	60 m	6.67
2019	World Relays	Yokohama, Japan	–	4 × 200 m relay	DQ
2019	European U23 Championships	Gävle, Sweden	7th	100 m	10.38 (w)
2019	European U23 Championships	Gävle, Sweden	2nd	4 × 100 m relay	39.57
2019	World Championships	Doha, Qatar	5th (h)	4 × 100 m relay	37.88^{1}
2021	European Indoor Championships	Toruń, Poland	10th (sf)	60 m	6.64
2021	World Relays	Chorzów, Poland	10th (h)	4 × 100 m relay	39.08

^{1}Did not finish in the final

== Personal bests ==
Outdoor

- 100 metres – 10.07 (+1.1 m/s, Jesolo 2018)
- 200 metres – 20.94 (+0.4 m/s, Oordegem 2018)

Indoor

- 60 metres – 6.65 (Reims 2019)
