= Kevin Kranz =

German sprinter

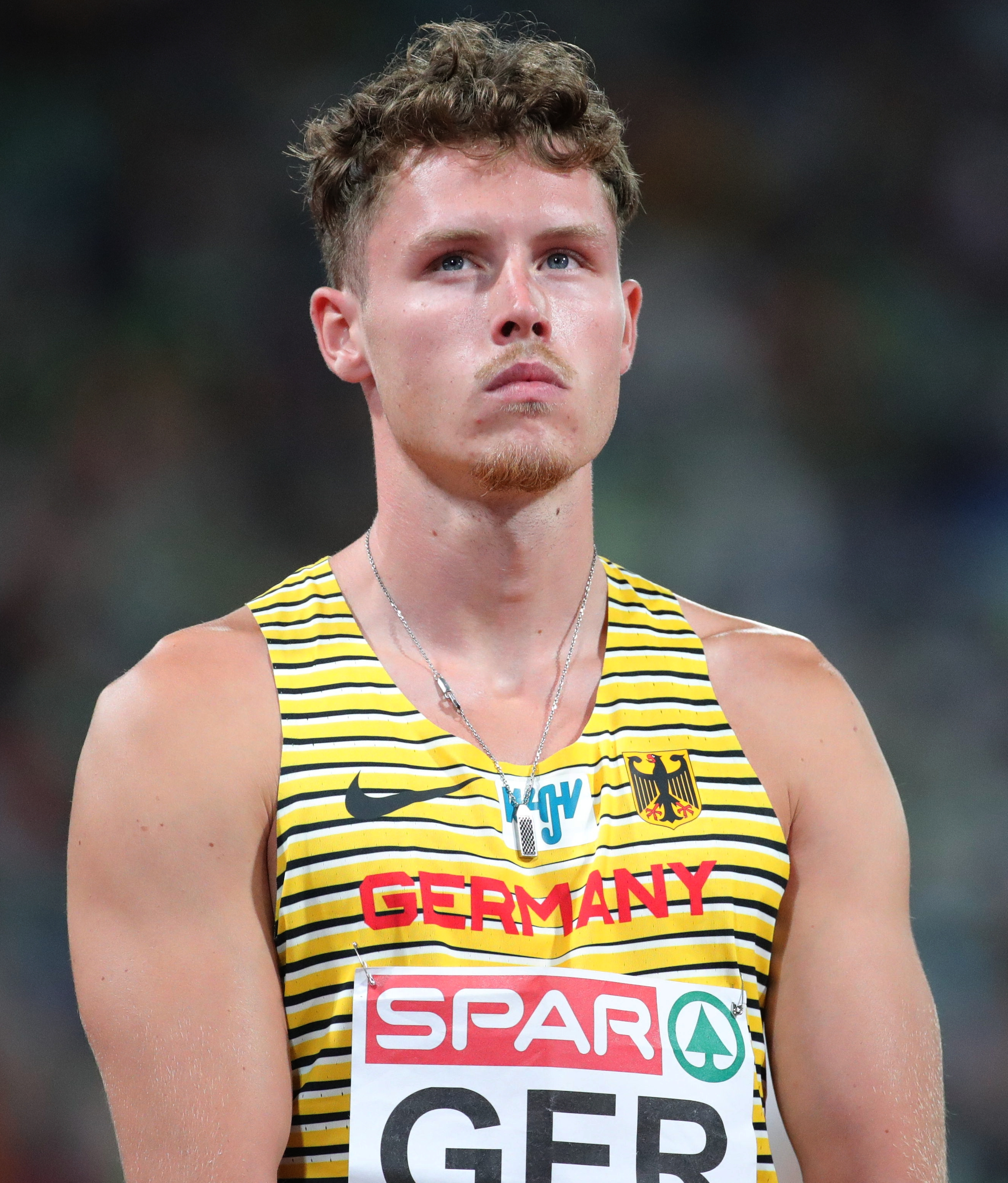
- Kevin Kranz in 2022

Personal information
- Born: 20 June 1998 (age 28) Frankfurt am Main, Germany
- Height: 1.80 m (5 ft 11 in)
- Weight: 70 kg (154 lb)

Sport
- Sport: Athletics
- Event: 100 m
- Club: Sprintteam Wetzlar; LG Eintracht Frankfurt
- Coached by: David Corell
Medal record
Men's athletics
Representing Germany
World Relays
Bronze medal – third place	2026 Gaborone	4 × 100 m relay
European Championships
Silver medal – second place	2026 Birmingham	4 × 100 m relay
Silver medal – second place	2026 Birmingham	4 × 100 m mixed
Bronze medal – third place	2024 Rome	4 × 100 m relay
European Indoor Championships
Silver medal – second place	2021 Toruń	60 m
European U23 Championships
Gold medal – first place	2019 Gävle	4 × 100 m relay

Kevin Kranz (born 20 June 1998) is a German sprinter. He won in the 4 × 100 metres relay at the 2019 European U23 Championships. Earlier that year, he made the final at the 2019 European Indoor Championships in Birmingham finishing eighth.

== International competitions ==
Year	Competition	Venue	Position	Event	Notes
Representing Germany
2018	European Championships	Berlin, Germany	16th (h)	100 m	10.41
2018	European Championships	Berlin, Germany	–	4 × 100 m relay	DNF
2019	European Indoor Championships	Glasgow, United Kingdom	8th	60 m	6.73
2019	World Relays	Yokohama, Japan	16th (h)	4 × 100 m relay	38.91
2019	European U23 Championships	Gävle, Sweden	4th	100 m	10.28 (w)
2019	European U23 Championships	Gävle, Sweden	1st	4 × 100 m relay	39.22
2021	European Indoor Championships	Toruń, Poland	2nd	60 m	6.60
2022	World Championships	Eugene, United States	11th (h)	4 × 100 m relay	38.83
2022	European Championships	Munich, Germany	1st (h)	4 × 100 m relay	37.97^{1}
2023	World Championships	Budapest, Hungary	–	4 × 100 m relay	DNF
2024	European Championships	Rome, Italy	3rd	4 × 100 m relay	38.52
2024	Olympic Games	Paris, France	13th (h)	4 × 100 m relay	38.53
2025	European Indoor Championships	Apeldoorn, Netherlands	5th	60 m	6.57
2025	World Relays	Guangzhou, China	6th	4 × 100 m relay	38.92
2026	European Championships	Birmingham, United Kingdom	2nd	4 × 100 m relay	38.64

^{1}Did not start in the final

== Personal bests ==
Outdoor

- 100 metres – 10.24 (+1.6 m/s, Heilbronn 2018)
- 200 metres – 20.89 (+2.0 m/s, Heilbronn 2018)

Indoor

- 60 metres – 6.52 (Dortmund 2021)
- 200 metres – 22.77 (Hanau 2016)
