= Kojo Musah =

Danish sprinter

Personal information
- Born: 15 April 1996 (age 30)

Sport
- Sport: Athletics
- Events: 100 m, 200 m
- Club: Aarhus 1900

Kojo Musah (born 15 April 1996) is a Danish sprinter. He represented his country at the 2021 European Indoor Championships finishing eighth in the final.

He has a Ghanaian father and a Danish mother.

== International competitions ==
Year	Competition	Venue	Position	Event	Notes
Representing Denmark
2017	European U23 Championships	Bydgoszcz, Poland	20th (sf)	100 m	10.59
2017	European U23 Championships	Bydgoszcz, Poland	10th (h)	4 × 100 m relay	40.12
2019	European Indoor Championships	Glasgow, United Kingdom	29th (h)	60 m	6.81
2021	European Indoor Championships	Toruń, Poland	8th	60 m	6.68
2021	World Relays	Chorzów, Poland	3rd	4 × 100 m relay	39.56
2021	World Relays	Chorzów, Poland	–	4 × 200 m relay	DNF
2021	Olympic Games	Tokyo, Japan	29th (h)	100 m	10.20
2021	Olympic Games	Tokyo, Japan	10th (h)	4 × 100 m relay	38.16
2022	World Championships	Eugene, United States	–	4 × 100 m relay	DNF
2022	European Championships	Munich, Germany	–	100 m	DNF

== Personal bests ==
Outdoor

- 100 metres – 10.14 (+0.9 m/s, Odense 2021) NR
- 200 metres – 20.62 (+0.3 m/s, Kladno 2021)

Indoor

- 60 metres – 6.56 (Randers 2022) NR
