= 2021 European Athletics U23 Championships – Men's 100 metres =

Men's 100 metres at the 2021 European Athletics U23 Championships
- Venue: Kadriorg Stadium, Tallinn
- Dates: 8–9 July
- Competitors: 21 from 15 nations
- Winning time: 10.25

Medalists
gold medal	Jeremiah Azu	Great Britain
silver medal	Henrik Larsson	Sweden
bronze medal	Arnau Monné	Spain

The men's 100 metres event at the 2021 European Athletics U23 Championships was held in Tallinn, Estonia, at Kadriorg Stadium on 8 and 9 July.

== Records ==
Prior to the competition, the records were as follows:

European U23 record	Christophe Lemaitre (FRA)	9.92	Albi, France	29 July 2011
Championship U23 record	Simeon Williamson (GBR)	10.10	Debrecen, Hungary	13 July 2007

== Results ==
=== Round 1 ===
Qualification rule: First 2 in each heat (Q) and the next 2 fastest (q) advance to the Final.

Wind:
Heat 1: +1.3 m/s, Heat 2: +1.6 m/s, Heat 3: +1.0 m/s

Rank	Heat	Name	Nationality	Time	Notes
1	2	Jeremiah Azu	Great Britain	10.19	Q, PB
2	2	Riku Illukka	Finland	10.26	Q, NU23R
3	2	Arnau Monné	Spain	10.32	q
4	1	Henrik Larsson	Sweden	10.33	Q
5	2	Yannick Wolf	Germany	10.34	q
6	2	André Prazeres	Portugal	10.36	PB
7	3	Joshua Hartmann	Germany	10.37	Q
8	3	Sergio López	Spain	10.40	Q
9	1	Brandon Mingeli	Great Britain	10.45	Q
10	1	Pablo Montalvo	Spain	10.47	
11	3	Dominic Ashwell	Great Britain	10.47	
12	2	Henri Sai	Estonia	10.49	
13	3	Emil Mader Kjaer	Denmark	10.49	
14	2	Andrii Vasyliev	Ukraine	10.49	
15	1	Samuele Ceccarelli	Italy	10.52	
16	1	Štěpán Hampl	Czech Republic	10.54	
17	3	Bradley Lestrade	Switzerland	10.54	
18	3	Erik Kostrytsya	Ukraine	10.58	
19	1	Roberts Jānis Zālītis	Latvia	10.61	
20	1	Francesco Sansovini	San Marino	10.65	PB
21	3	Furkan Yıldırım	Turkey	10.89	

=== Final ===
Wind: –0.3 m/s

Rank	Lane	Name	Nationality	Time	Notes
1st place, gold medalist(s)	4	Jeremiah Azu	Great Britain	10.25	
2nd place, silver medalist(s)	3	Henrik Larsson	Sweden	10.36	
3rd place, bronze medalist(s)	1	Arnau Monné	Spain	10.41	
4	7	Sergio López	Spain	10.42	
5	2	Yannick Wolf	Germany	10.42	
6	6	Joshua Hartmann	Germany	10.52	
7	8	Brandon Mingeli	Great Britain	10.55	
	5	Riku Illukka	Finland	DNS	
