= Denis Dimitrov =

Bulgarian sprinter

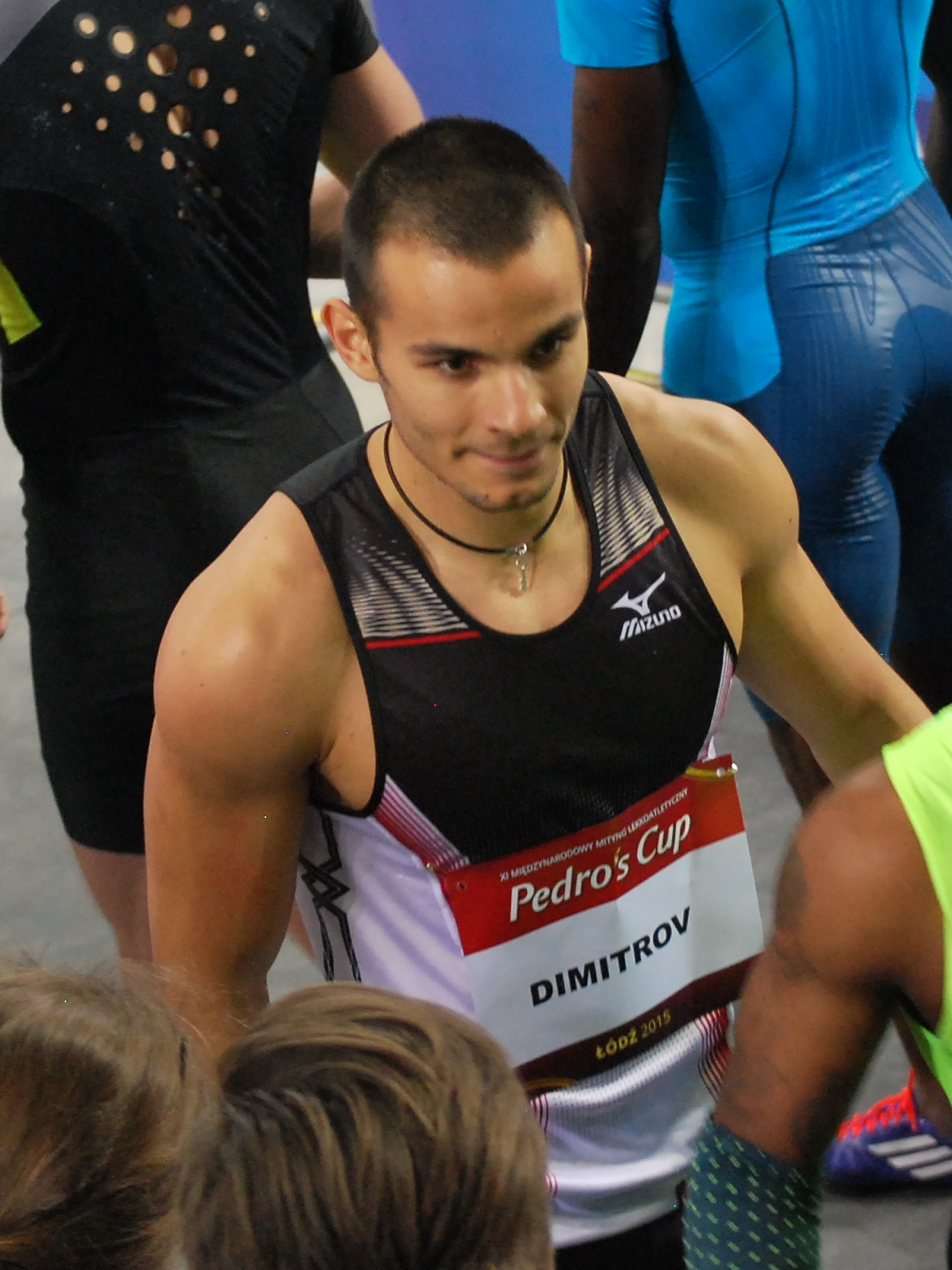
- Dimitrov in 2015

Personal information
- Nationality: Bulgarian
- Born: 10 February 1994 (age 32) Montana, Bulgaria

Sport
- Sport: Track and field
- Event: Sprints
- Club: Lokomotiv Ruse

Achievements and titles
- Personal best: 100 m: 10.16 (Pravets 2013) 200 m: 21.03 (Rieti 2013) 60 m: 6.65 (Prague 2015)
Medal record
Men's athletics
Representing Bulgaria
European Athletics Junior Championships
Silver medal – second place	2013 Rieti	100 m
European Athletics U23 Championships
Silver medal – second place	2015 Tallinn	100 m

Denis Dimitrov (Bulgarian: Денис Димитров, born 10 February 1994) is a Bulgarian sprinter. He competed in the 100 metres event at the 2013 World Championships in Athletics.

== Competition record ==
Year	Competition	Venue	Position	Event	Notes
Representing Bulgaria
2013	European Junior Championships	Rieti, Italy	2nd	100 m	10.46
2013	European Junior Championships	Rieti, Italy	7th	200 m	21.33
2013	World Championships	Moscow, Russia	30th (h)	100 m	10.29
2014	European Championships	Zürich, Switzerland	23rd (sf)	100 m	10.98
2015	European Indoor Championships	Prague, Czech Republic	11th (sf)	60 m	6.66
2015	European U23 Championships	Tallinn, Estonia	2nd	100 m	10.34
2016	European Championships	Amsterdam, Netherlands	23rd (h)	100 m	10.57
2017	European Indoor Championships	Belgrade, Serbia	21st (h)	60 m	6.82
2018	European Championships	Berlin, Germany	21st (h)	100 m	10.45
2019	European Indoor Championships	Glasgow, United Kingdom	39th (h)	60 m	6.95
2021	European Indoor Championships	Toruń, Poland	55th (h)	60 m	6.85

== Personal bests ==
Outdoor

- 100 metres – 10.16 (+1.5 m/s) (Pravets 2013)
- 200 metres – 21.03 (+1.5 m/s) (Rieti 2013)

Indoor

- 60 metres – 6.65 (Prague 2015)
