= Zafarobod (disambiguation) =

Zafarobod may refer to:

- Zafarobod, a town in Sughd Region, Tajikistan
- Zafarobod District, Tajikistan, Sughd Region, Tajikistan
- Zafarobod, Jizzakh Region, Uzbekistan
- Zafarobod District, Uzbekistan, Jizzakh Region, Uzbekistan
- Zafarobod, Navoiy, Uzbekistan

== See also ==
- Zafarabad (disambiguation)
