= Oliver Bromby =

English sprinter (born 1998)

Personal information
- Born: 30 March 1998 (age 27) Southampton, United Kingdom
- Education: London Metropolitan University
- Height: 1.77 m (5 ft 10 in)

Sport
- Sport: Athletics
- Event: 100 m
- Club: Southampton AC
- Coached by: Marvin Rowe (Speedworks London)

Oliver Bromby (born 30 March 1998) is an English sprinter competing primarily in the 100 metres. He won a silver medal at the 2019 European U23 Championships.

== International competitions ==
| Year | Competition | Venue | Position | Event | Notes |
Representing Great Britain and England
| 2015 | World Youth Championships | Cali, Colombia | 4th | 100 m | 10.60 |
| 2015 | Commonwealth Youth Games | Apia, Samoa | 4th | 100 m | 10.45 |
| 2016 | World U20 Championships | Bydgoszcz, Poland | 9th (sf) | 100 m | 10.37 |
| 2016 | World U20 Championships | Bydgoszcz, Poland | 6th | 4 × 100 m relay | 39.57 |
| 2017 | European U20 Championships | Grosseto, Italy | 3rd | 100 m | 10.88 |
| 2017 | European U20 Championships | Grosseto, Italy | 4th | 4 × 100 m relay | 39.67 |
| 2019 | European U23 Championships | Gävle, Sweden | 2nd | 100 m | 10.24 (w) |
| 2019 | European U23 Championships | Gävle, Sweden | 5th (h) | 4 × 100 m relay | 39.78^{1} |
| 2021 | European Indoor Championships | Toruń, Poland | 11th (sf) | 60 m | 6.64 |

^{1}Did not finish in the final

== Personal bests ==
Outdoor

- 100 metres – 10.22 (+1.5 m/s, Lee Valley 2019)
- 200 metres – 21.32 (+1.5 m/s, Eton 2015)

Indoor

- 60 metres – 6.63 (Ostrava, Czech Republic 2020)
- 200 metres – 21.36 (Sheffield 1016)
