= Joris van Gool =

Dutch sprinter (born 1998)

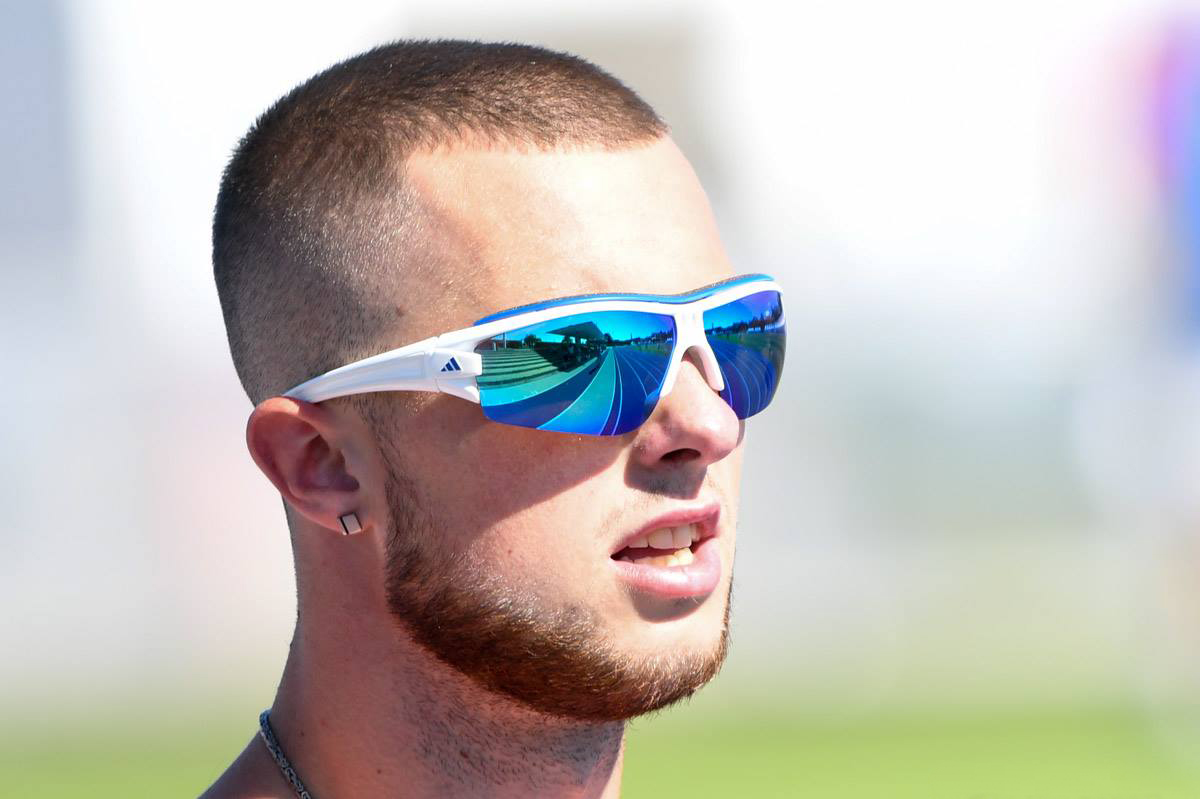
- Van Gool at the 2018 European Championships

Personal information
- Born: 4 April 1998 (age 28) Tilburg, Netherlands
- Height: 1.79 m (5 ft 10 in)
- Weight: 75 kg (165 lb)

Sport
- Sport: Athletics
- Event(s): 60 m, 100 m
- Club: AV Spiridon
Medal record
Men's athletics
Representing Netherlands
European Indoor Championships
Bronze medal – third place	2019 Glasgow	60 m

Joris van Gool (Dutch: [ˈjoːrɪs fɑŋ ˈɣoːl]; born 4 April 1998) is a Dutch sprinter. He won a bronze medal at the 2019 European Indoor Championships. He also represented his country at 2018 European Championships without advancing from the first round.

== International competitions ==
Year	Competition	Venue	Position	Event	Notes
Representing the Netherlands
2013	European Youth Olympic Festival	Utrecht, Netherlands	4th	100 m	10.85 (w)
2013	European Youth Olympic Festival	Utrecht, Netherlands	3rd	4 × 100 m relay	42.19
2016	World U20 Championships	Bydgoszcz, Poland	27th (h)	100 m	10.69
2017	European U20 Championships	Grosseto, Italy	24th (sf)	100 m	11.03
2018	European Championships	Berlin, Germany	26th (h)	100 m	10.52
2019	European Indoor Championships	Glasgow, United Kingdom	3rd	60 m	6.62
2019	European U23 Championships	Gävle, Sweden	3rd	100 m	10.27 (w)
2019	European U23 Championships	Gävle, Sweden	2nd (h)	4 × 100 m relay	39.47^{1}
2019	World Championships	Doha, Qatar	7th (h)	4 × 100 m relay	37.91^{2}
2021	European Indoor Championships	Toruń, Poland	–	60 m	DQ
2021	World Relays	Chorzów, Poland	5th (h)	4 × 100 m relay	38.79^{1}
2021	Olympic Games	Tokyo, Japan	–	4 × 100 m relay	DNF
2022	World Championships	Eugene, United States	13th (h)	4 × 100 m relay	39.07
2022	European Championships	Munich, Germany	14th (h)	100 m	10.45
2022	European Championships	Munich, Germany	4th	4 × 100 m relay	38.25
2023	European Indoor Championships	Istanbul, Turkey	24th (h)	60 m	6.72

^{1}Did not finish in the final
^{2}Disqualified in the final

== Personal bests ==
Outdoor

- 100 metres – 10.16 (-2.0 m/s, La Chaux-de-Fonds 2019)
- 200 metres – 21.51 (-1.7 m/s, Amsterdam 2016)

Indoor

- 60 metres – 6.58 NR (Dortmund 2021)
