= 2016 IAAF World U20 Championships – Men's 100 metres =

The men's 100 metres event at the 2016 IAAF World U20 Championships was held at Zdzisław Krzyszkowiak Stadium on 19 and 20 July.

== Medalists ==
Gold	Noah Lyles; United States
Silver	Filippo Tortu; Italy
Bronze	Mario Burke; Barbados

== Records ==
Standing records prior to the 2016 IAAF World U20 Championships in Athletics
World Junior Record	Trayvon Bromell (USA)	9.97	Eugene, Oregon, United States	13 June 2014
Championship Record	Adam Gemili (GBR)	10.05	Barcelona, Spain	11 July 2012
World Junior Leading	Abdullah Abkar Mohammed (KSA)	10.04	Norwalk, California, United States	15 April 2016

== Results ==
=== Heats ===
Qualification: First 3 of each heat (Q) and the 6 fastest times (q) qualified for the semifinals.

Wind:
Heat 1: -0.4 m/s, Heat 2: +0.6 m/s, Heat 3: +0.7 m/s, Heat 4: +0.4 m/s, Heat 5: +0.6 m/s, Heat 6: -0.6 m/s

Rank	Heat	Name	Nationality	Time	Note
1	3	Noah Lyles	United States	10.10	Q
2	4	Filippo Tortu	Italy	10.29	Q
3	2	Paulo André de Oliveira	Brazil	10.31	Q
4	5	Tlotliso Leotlela	South Africa	10.32	Q
5	6	Mario Burke	Barbados	10.33	Q
6	3	Derick Silva	Brazil	10.34	Q
7	3	Eryk Hampel	Poland	10.39	Q, PB
8	6	Kenta Oshima	Japan	10.44	Q, SB
9	2	Khairul Hafiz Jantan	Malaysia	10.44	Q
10	5	Rechmial Miller	Great Britain	10.44	Q
11	6	Raheem Chambers	Jamaica	10.45	Q
12	4	Austin Hamilton	Sweden	10.46	Q, SB
13	2	Jhevaughn Matherson	Jamaica	10.47	Q
14	1	Jack Hale	Australia	10.48	Q
15	3	Manuel Eitel	Germany	10.50	q
16	1	Oliver Bromby	Great Britain	10.52	Q
17	2	Stanislau Darahakupets	Belarus	10.54	q
18	5	Daniel Estrada	Puerto Rico	10.55	Q
18	3	Jhonny Rentería	Colombia	10.55	q
20	5	Amaury Golitin	France	10.56	q
21	4	Hakim Montgomery	United States	10.58	Q
22	4	Jaquone Hoyte	Barbados	10.58	q
23	1	Ippei Takeda	Japan	10.61	Q
24	3	Oleksandr Sokolov	Ukraine	10.65	q
25	4	Badrul Hisyam Abdul Manap	Malaysia	10.66	
26	2	Thomas Barthel	Germany	10.67	
27	5	Joris van Gool	Netherlands	10.69	
28	5	Trae Williams	Australia	10.70	
29	1	Dylan Sicobo	Seychelles	10.79	
30	2	Lee Gyu-hyeong	South Korea	10.84	
31	6	Andrea Federici	Italy	10.87	
32	1	Akanni Hislop	Trinidad and Tobago	10.88	
33	6	Luo Wenyi	China	10.93	SB
34	6	Aobakwe Malau	Botswana	10.96	
35	4	Gonzalo Fumont	Uruguay	11.05	
36	5	Vicente Antonio Aranda	Honduras	11.25	
37	1	Eric Borg Saywell	Malta	11.30	
38	1	Phemelo Matlhabe	South Africa	11.99	
	2	Arturo Deliser	Panama	DNS	
	2	Pascual Ochaga	Equatorial Guinea	DNS	
	3	Emmanuel Arowolo	Nigeria	DNS	
	4	Hakeem Huggins	Saint Kitts and Nevis	DNS	
	6	Raymond Ekevwo	Nigeria	DNS	

=== Semifinals ===
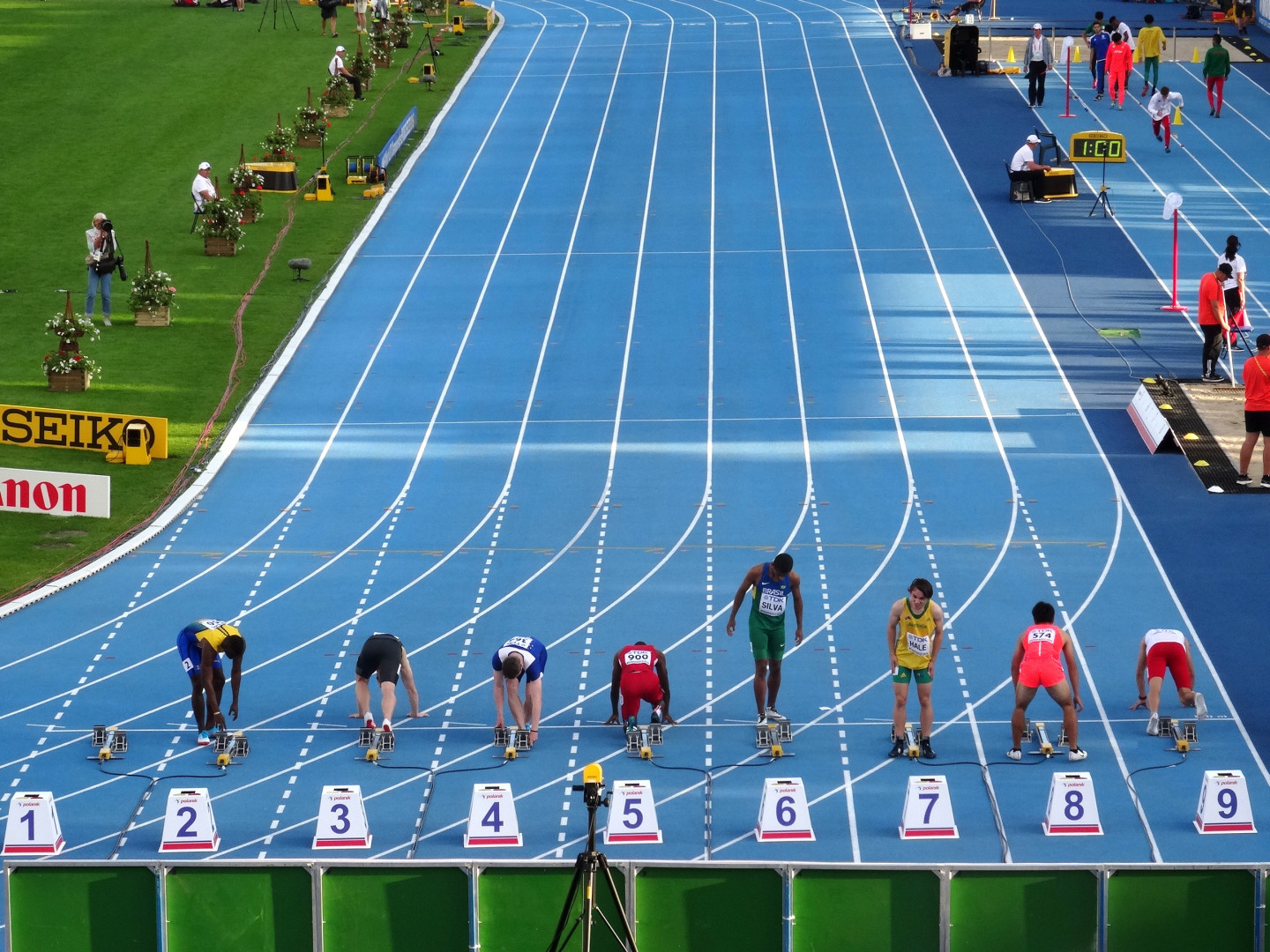
Semifinal 2

Qualification: First 2 of each heat (Q) and the 2 fastest times (q) qualified for the final.

Wind:
Heat 1: -0.6 m/s, Heat 2: +0.2 m/s, Heat 3: +0.7 m/s

Rank	Heat	Name	Nationality	Time	Note
1	3	Tlotliso Leotlela	South Africa	10.20	Q
2	2	Noah Lyles	United States	10.22	Q
3	1	Filippo Tortu	Italy	10.26	Q
4	3	Paulo André de Oliveira	Brazil	10.32	Q
5	1	Mario Burke	Barbados	10.34	Q
6	1	Raheem Chambers	Jamaica	10.36	q
7	2	Derick Silva	Brazil	10.37	Q
8	3	Rechmial Miller	Great Britain	10.37	q
9	2	Oliver Bromby	Great Britain	10.37	PB
10	3	Jhevaughn Matherson	Jamaica	10.40	
11	1	Kenta Oshima	Japan	10.43	SB
12	2	Jack Hale	Australia	10.45	
13	1	Austin Hamilton	Sweden	10.47	
14	2	Manuel Eitel	Germany	10.53	
15	1	Hakim Montgomery	United States	10.53	
16	3	Jhonny Rentería	Colombia	10.53	
17	3	Amaury Golitin	France	10.54	
18	2	Ippei Takeda	Japan	10.56	
19	2	Eryk Hampel	Poland	10.58	
19	3	Daniel Estrada	Puerto Rico	10.58	
21	3	Khairul Hafiz Jantan	Malaysia	10.58	
22	1	Stanislau Darahakupets	Belarus	10.63	
23	1	Oleksandr Sokolov	Ukraine	10.65	
24	2	Jaquone Hoyte	Barbados	10.73	

=== Final ===
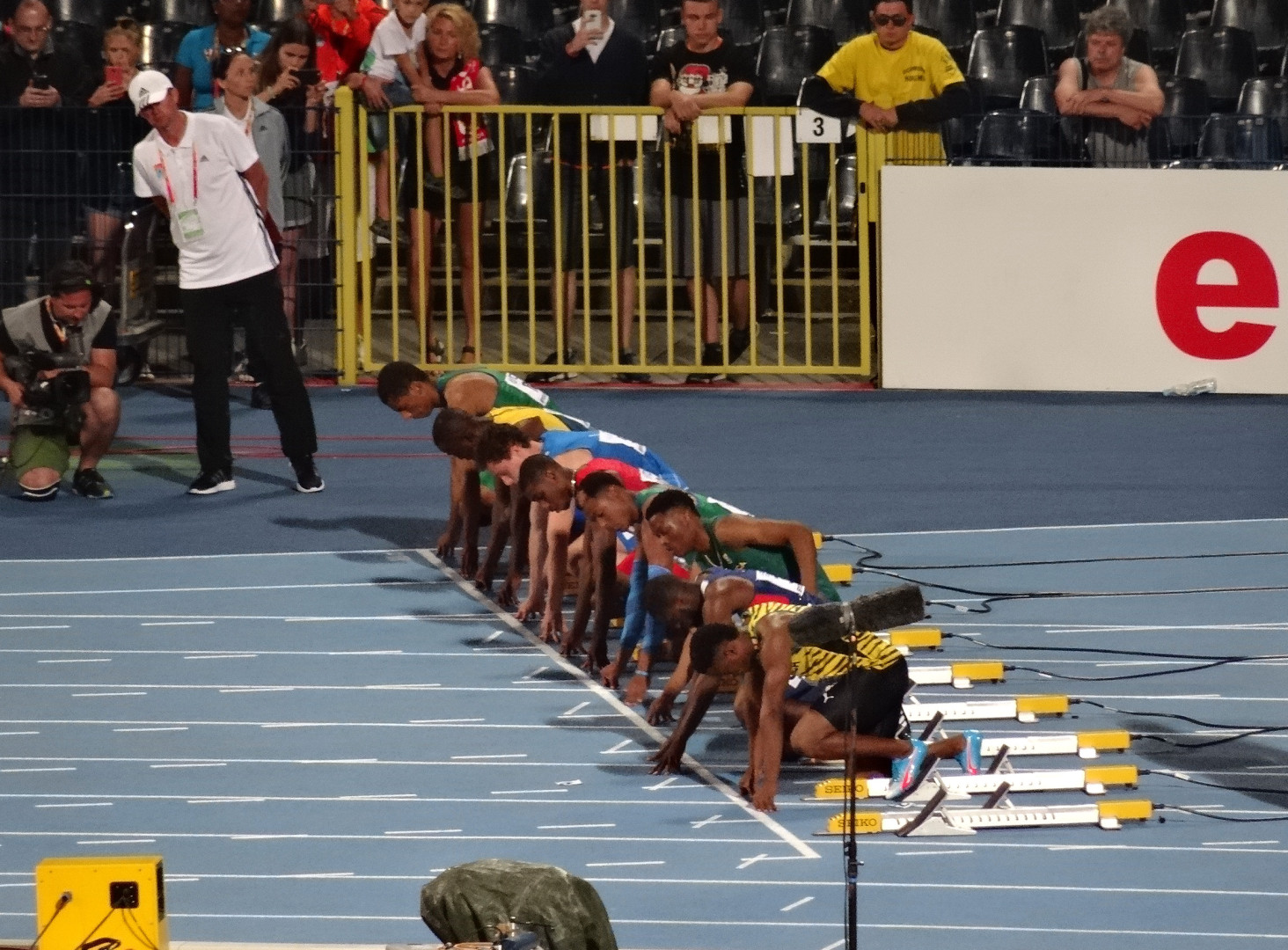
The finalists set in the blocks

Wind: +0.2 m/s

Rank	Lane	Name	Nationality	Time	Note
1st place, gold medalist(s)	6	Noah Lyles	United States	10.17	
2nd place, silver medalist(s)	7	Filippo Tortu	Italy	10.24	
3rd place, bronze medalist(s)	8	Mario Burke	Barbados	10.26	
4	4	Tlotliso Leotlela	South Africa	10.28	
5	5	Paulo André de Oliveira	Brazil	10.29	
6	2	Raheem Chambers	Jamaica	10.30	
7	9	Derick Silva	Brazil	10.37	
8	3	Rechmial Miller	Great Britain	16.18	
