= Henrik Larsson (sprinter) =

Swedish sprinter

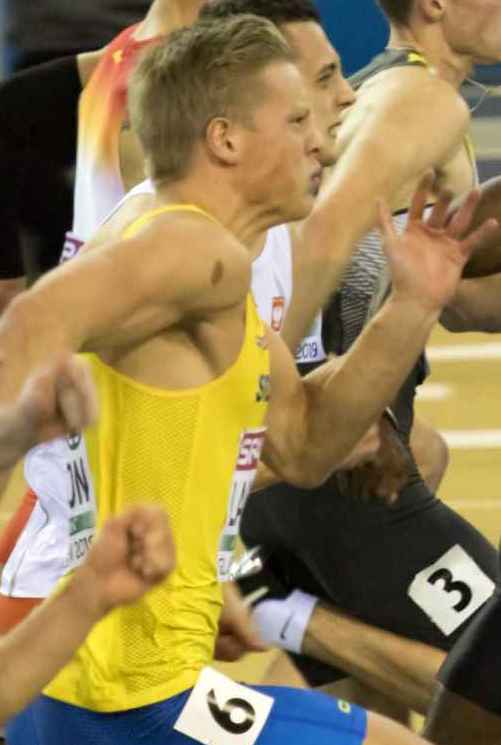
- Henrik Larsson in 2019

Personal information
- Born: 30 September 1999 (age 26)

Sport
- Sport: Athletics
- Events: 60 m, 100 m, 200 m
- Club: IF Göta Karlstad
- Coached by: Roger Larsson; Maria Larsson; Stefan Appel
Medal record
Men's athletics
Representing Sweden
European Indoor Championships
Silver medal – second place	2025 Apeldoorn	60 m
Bronze medal – third place	2023 Istanbul	60 m
European U23 Championships
Gold medal – first place	2019 Gävle	100 m
Silver medal – second place	2021 Tallinn	100 m
European Youth Olympic Festival
Gold medal – first place	2015 Tbilisi	100 m
European Youth Championships
Silver medal – second place	2016 Tbilisi	100 m

Henrik Roger Larsson (born 30 September 1999) is a Swedish sprinter. He is a European Indoor Championships silver and bronze medalist in the 60 metres and a European U23 Championships gold and silver medallist in the 100 metres. Larsson is also a European Youth Olympic Festival gold medallist and European Youth Championships silver medallist in the 100 metres.

Larsson holds the Swedish record in the 100 metres outdoor with a time of 10.08 (+0.3 m/s, Graz 2024) and the 60 metres indoor with a time of 6.52 (Apeldoorn 2025).

== International competitions ==
Year	Competition	Venue	Position	Event	Notes
Representing Sweden
2015	European Youth Olympic Festival	Tbilisi, Georgia	1st	100 m	10.72
2016	European Youth Championships	Tbilisi, Georgia	2nd	100 m	10.57
2016	European Youth Championships	Tbilisi, Georgia	4th	200 m	21.30
2017	European U20 Championships	Grosseto, Italy	6th	100 m	10.98
2017	European U20 Championships	Grosseto, Italy	8th (sf)	200 m	21.44
2018	World U20 Championships	Tampere, Finland	6th	100 m	10.28
2018	World U20 Championships	Tampere, Finland	5th (sf)	200 m	20.85^{1}
2018	European Championships	Berlin, Germany	35th (h)	100 m	10.62
2019	European Indoor Championships	Birmingham, United Kingdom	9th (sf)	60 m	6.69
2019	European U23 Championships	Gävle, Sweden	1st	100 m	10.23 (w)
2019	European U23 Championships	Gävle, Sweden	19th (h)	200 m	21.28^{2}
2021	European U23 Championships	Tallinn, Estonia	2nd	100 m	10.36
2022	European Championships	Munich, Germany	18th (sf)	100 m	10.28
2023	European Indoor Championships	Istanbul, Turkey	3rd	60 m	6.53 NR
2023	World Championships	Budapest, Hungary	21st (sf)	100 m	10.20
2024	World Indoor Championships	Glasgow, United Kingdom	5th	60 m	6.56
2024	European Championships	Rome, Italy	4th	100 m	10.16
2024	Olympic Games	Paris, France	40th (h)	100 m	10.24
2025	European Indoor Championships	Apeldoorn, Netherlands	2nd	60 m	6.52 NR
2025	World Championships	Tokyo, Japan	17th (sf)	200 m	20.32
2026	European Championships	Birmingham, United Kingdom	13th (sf)	200 m	20.48

^{1}Did not start in the final
^{2}Did not start in the semifinals

== Personal bests ==
Outdoor

- 100 metres – 10.08 (+0.3 m/s, Graz 2024)
- 200 metres – 20.32 (+1.0 m/s, Tokyo 2025)

Indoor

- 60 metres – 6.52 (Apeldoorn 2025)
- 200 metres – 21.78 (Rud 2019)
