= Konstadinos Zikos =

Greek sprinter (born 1998)

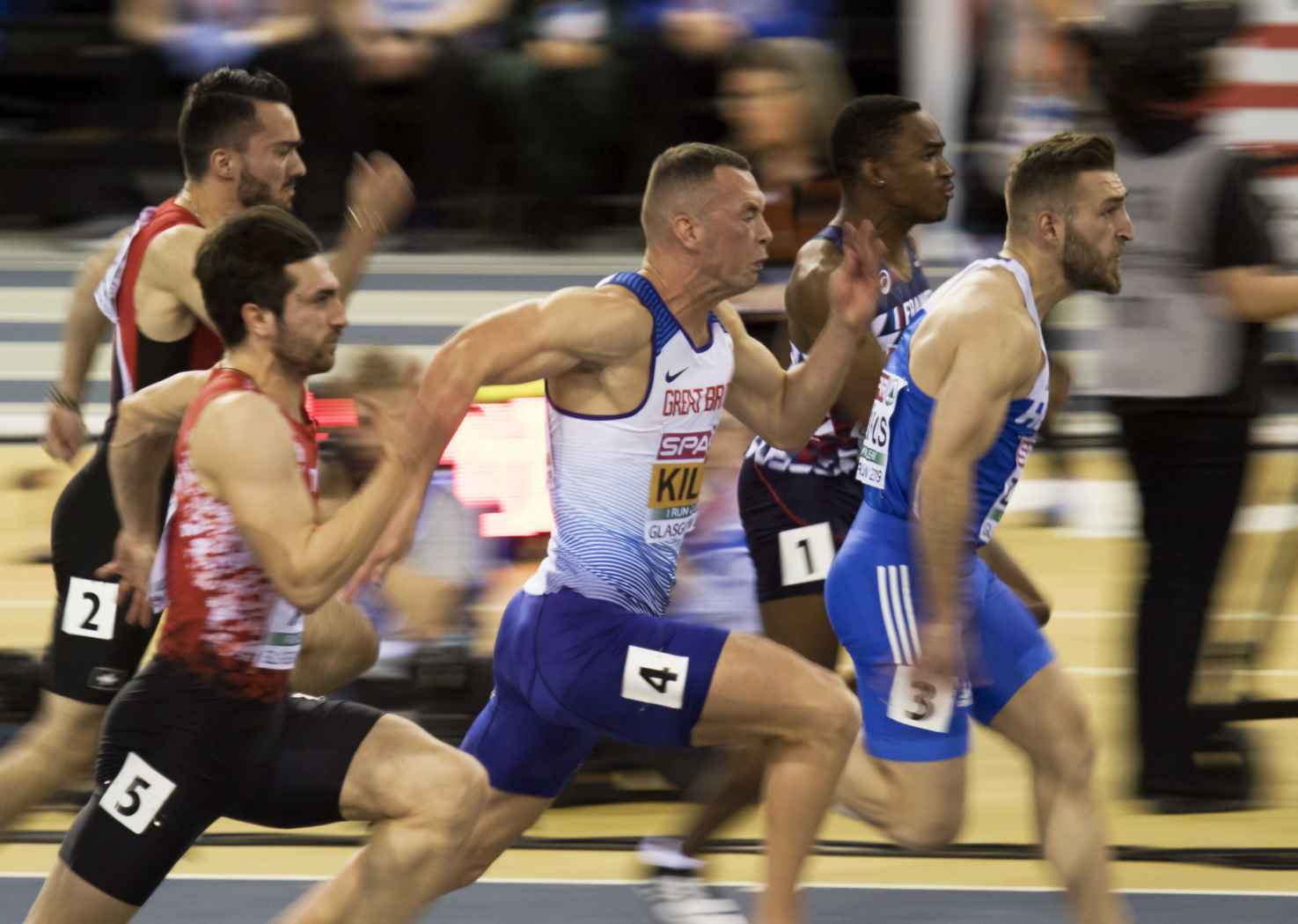
- Konstadinos Zikos (leading) in 2019

Personal information
- Born: 24 April 1998 (age 28) Trikala, Greece
- Height: 1.75 m (5 ft 9 in)
- Weight: 77 kg (170 lb)

Sport
- Sport: Athletics
- Event: 100 m
- Club: GEA Trikalon
- Coached by: Vangelis Katsiavas

Konstadinos Zikos (Greek: Κωνσταντίνος Ζήκος; born 24 April 1998) is a Greek sprinter competing mostly in the 60 and 100 metres. He represented his country at the 2019 and 2021 European Indoor Championships finishing fifth on the first occasion.

== International competitions ==
Year	Competition	Venue	Position	Event	Notes
Representing Greece
2017	European U20 Championships	Grosseto, Italy	11th (sf)	100 m	10.68
2017	European U20 Championships	Grosseto, Italy	6th	4 × 100 m relay	40.40
2018	Balkan Indoor Championships	Istanbul, Turkey	3rd	60 m	6.72
2018	Mediterranean Games	Tarragona, Spain	5th	4 × 100 m relay	39.72
2019	European Indoor Championships	Glasgow, United Kingdom	5th	60 m	6.67
2019	European U23 Championships	Gävle, Sweden	14th (sf)	100 m	10.87
2020	Balkan Indoor Championships	Istanbul, Turkey	1st	60 m	6.66
2021	European Indoor Championships	Toruń, Poland	12th (sf)	60 m	6.67
2022	Mediterranean Games	Oran, Algeria	10th (h)	100 m	10.54
2022	Mediterranean Games	Oran, Algeria	4th	4 × 100 m relay	39.10
2022	European Championships	Munich, Germany	10th (h)	4 × 100 m relay	39.11

== Personal bests ==
Outdoor

- 100 metres – 10.41 (+0.8 m/s, Kalamata 2019)
- 200 metres – 21.88 (-0.4 m/s, Trikala 2019)

Indoor

- 60 metres – 6.62 (Piraeus 2019)
