= Zafar =

Zafar may refer to:

- Zafar (name)
- Zafar, Uzbekistan
- Zafar, Yemen, an ancient Yemeni city
- Zafar, a medieval port city whose main ruins lie in the Al-Baleed Archaeological Park, Oman
- Zafar (anti-ship missile), an Iranian missile
- Zafar (newspaper), daily newspaper in Iran published between 1944 and 1947
- Battle of Zafar, 632 battle of early Muslims

== See also ==
- Zafer (disambiguation)
- Zafarabad (disambiguation)
