= Chituru Ali =

Italian sprinter (born 1999)

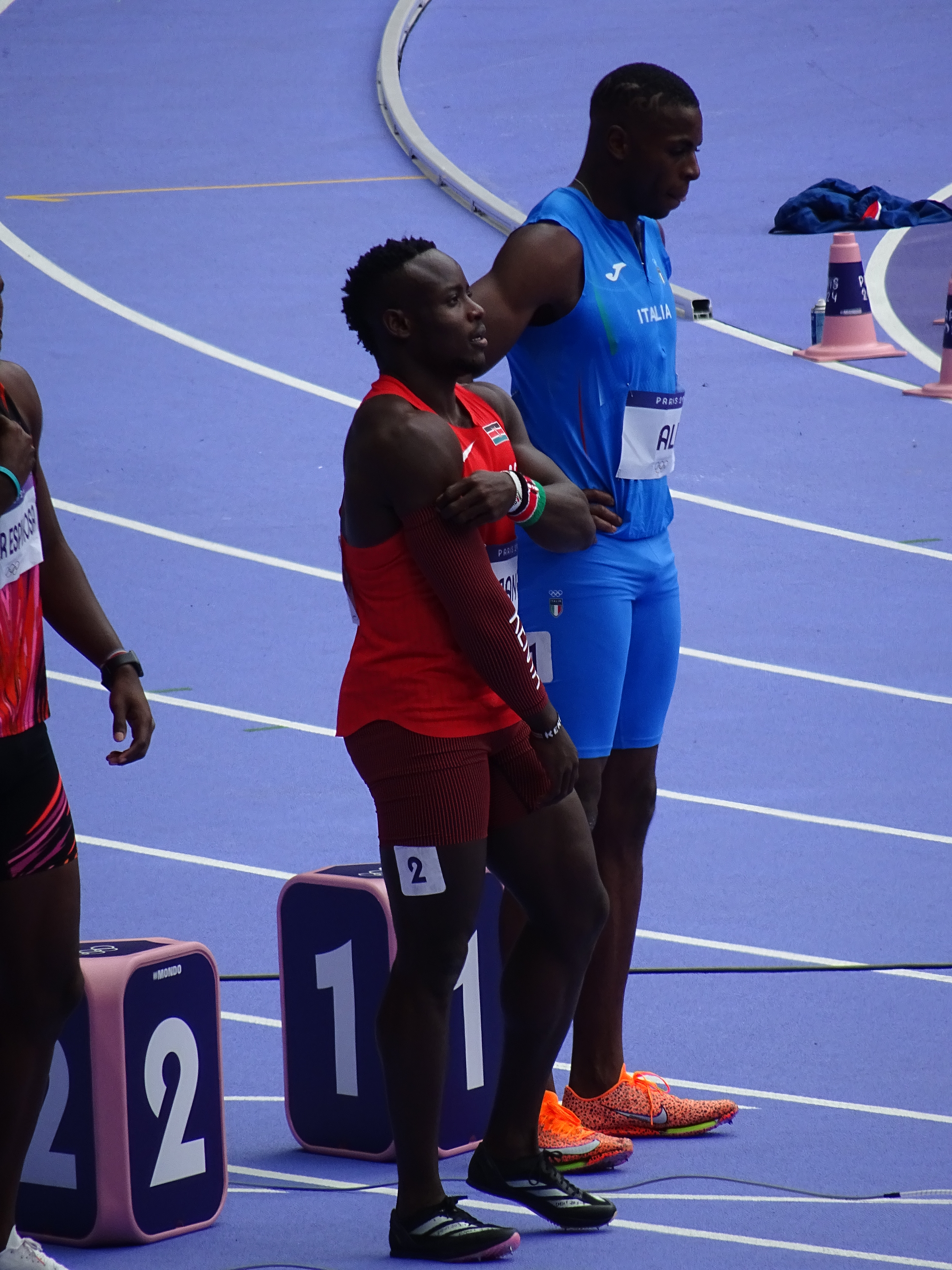
- Ali (right) at Paris 2024

Personal information
- National team: Italy
- Born: 6 April 1999 (age 27) Como, Italy
- Height: 1.98 m (6 ft 6 in)
- Weight: 98 kg (216 lb)

Sport
- Sport: Athletics
- Event: Sprinting
- Club: G.S. Fiamme Gialle
- Coached by: Claudio Licciardello

Achievements and titles
- Personal best: 100 m: 9.96 (2024)
Medal record
Men's athletics
Representing Italy
European Championships
Silver medal – second place	2024 Rome	100 m

Chituru Ali (Italian pronunciation: [ˈtʃiːtru ˈaːli]; born 6 April 1999) is an Italian athlete who competes as a sprinter. In the 100 metres he won the silver medal at the 2024 European Athletics Championships.

== Personal life ==
Ali was born in Como, Italy, to a Ghanaian father and a Nigerian mother. He was taken in foster care by the local Mottin family, and was raised in the borough of Albate.

== Career ==
On 18 June 2022 in Madrid, establishing his personal best 10.15 in the 100 metres, he became the 9th Italian athlete in the all-time top lists and 12th in the European 2022 top lists.

At the 2022 European Athletics Championships he has been finalist in the 100 metres.

On 8 June 2024 he improved his personal best to 10.05 in the 100 metres, winning the silver medal at the European championships in Rome.

== Personal bests ==
Outdoor

- 100 metres – 9.96 (Turku 2024)
- 200 metres – 20.64 (-0.3 m/s, Grosseto 2022)

Indoor

- 60 metres – 6.61 (Ancona 2022)

== Achievements ==
Year	Competition	Venue	Rank	Event	Time	Notes
2022	World Championships	(United States) Eugene	heats	100 m	10.40	
2022	World Championships	(United States) Eugene	heats	4 × 100 m relay	38.74	SB
2022	European Championships	(Germany) Munich	8th	100 m	10.28	(Note: He ran 10.12 in semifinals)
2022	European Championships	(Germany) Munich	heats	4 × 100 m relay	39.02	
2024	European Championships	(Italy) Rome	2nd	100 m	10.05	PB

== See also ==
- Italian all-time lists - 100 m
