= Zafarabad, Fars =

Zafarabad ظفراباد
- Village
- Location within Iran
- Coordinates: 29°24′43″N 52°35′00″E
- Country: Iran
- Province: Fars
- County: Shiraz
- Bakhsh: Central
- Rural District: Bid Zard

Population (2006)
  - Total: 4,112
- Time zone: UTC+3:30 (IRST)
  - Summer (DST): UTC+4:30 (IRDT)

Zafarabad (Persian: ظفراباد, also Romanized as Z̧afarābād) is a village in Bid Zard Rural District, in the Central District of Shiraz County, Fars province, Iran. At the 2006 census, its population was 4,112, in 1,079 families. ظفر آباد بزرگترین روستای منطقه قره باغ است و مرکزیت بسیاری از فعالیتهای منطقه در آنجاست .
