= Deniz Almas =

German sprinter (born 1997)

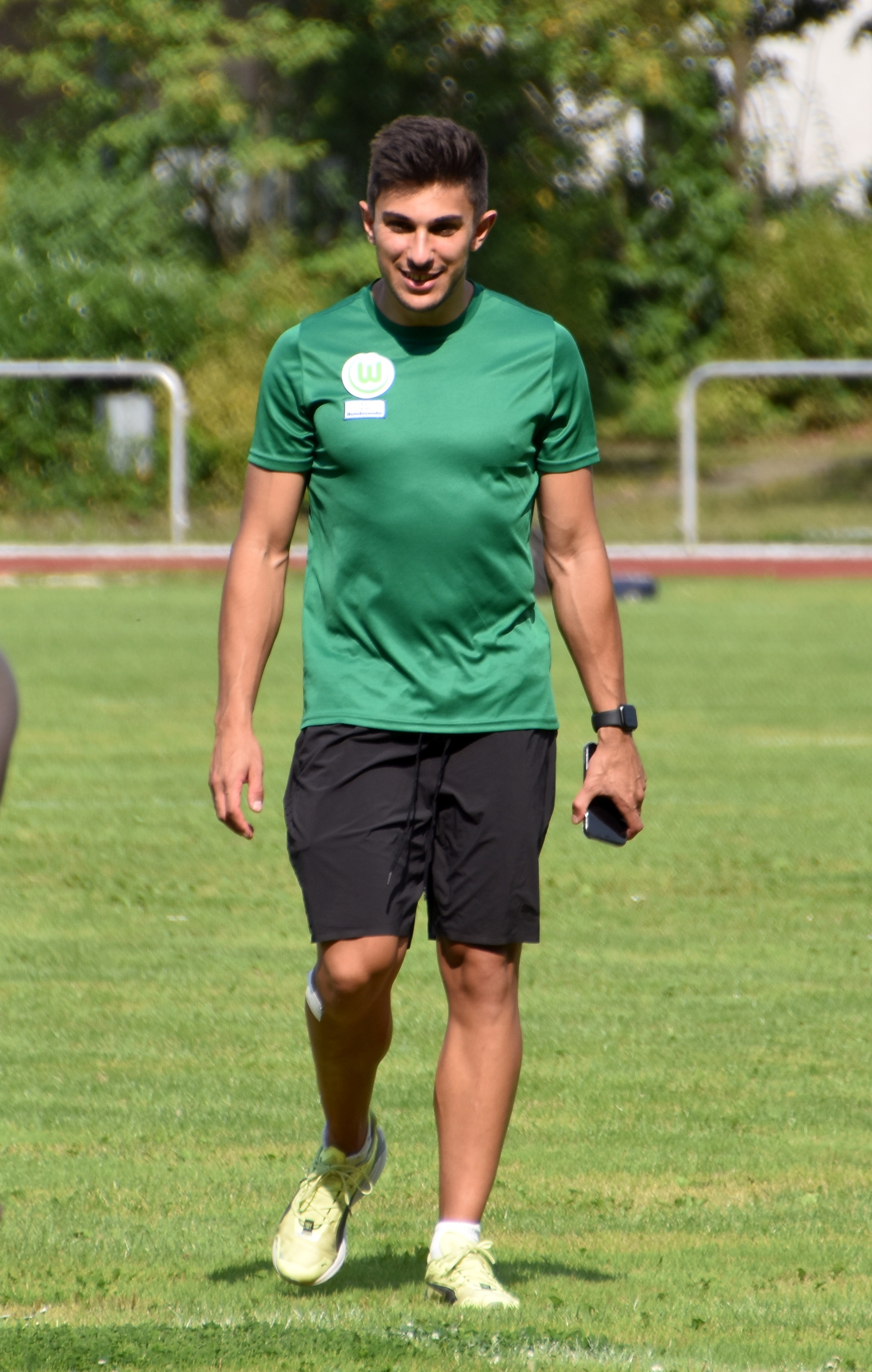
- Almas in 2021

Personal information
- Nationality: German
- Born: 17 July 1997 (age 28) Calw, Germany
- Height: 1.76 m (5 ft 9 in)
- Weight: 76 kg (168 lb)

Sport
- Sport: Athletics
- Event: 100 metres
Medal record
Men's athletics
Representing Germany
European Championships
Bronze medal – third place	2024 Rome	4 × 100 m relay

Deniz Almas (born 17 July 1997) is a German athlete. He competed in the men's 4 × 100 metres relay event at the 2020 Summer Olympics.

== Personal life ==
Almas was born in Calw, Germany to a Turkish father and German mother.
