= Zafer Square =

Square in Ankara, Turkey

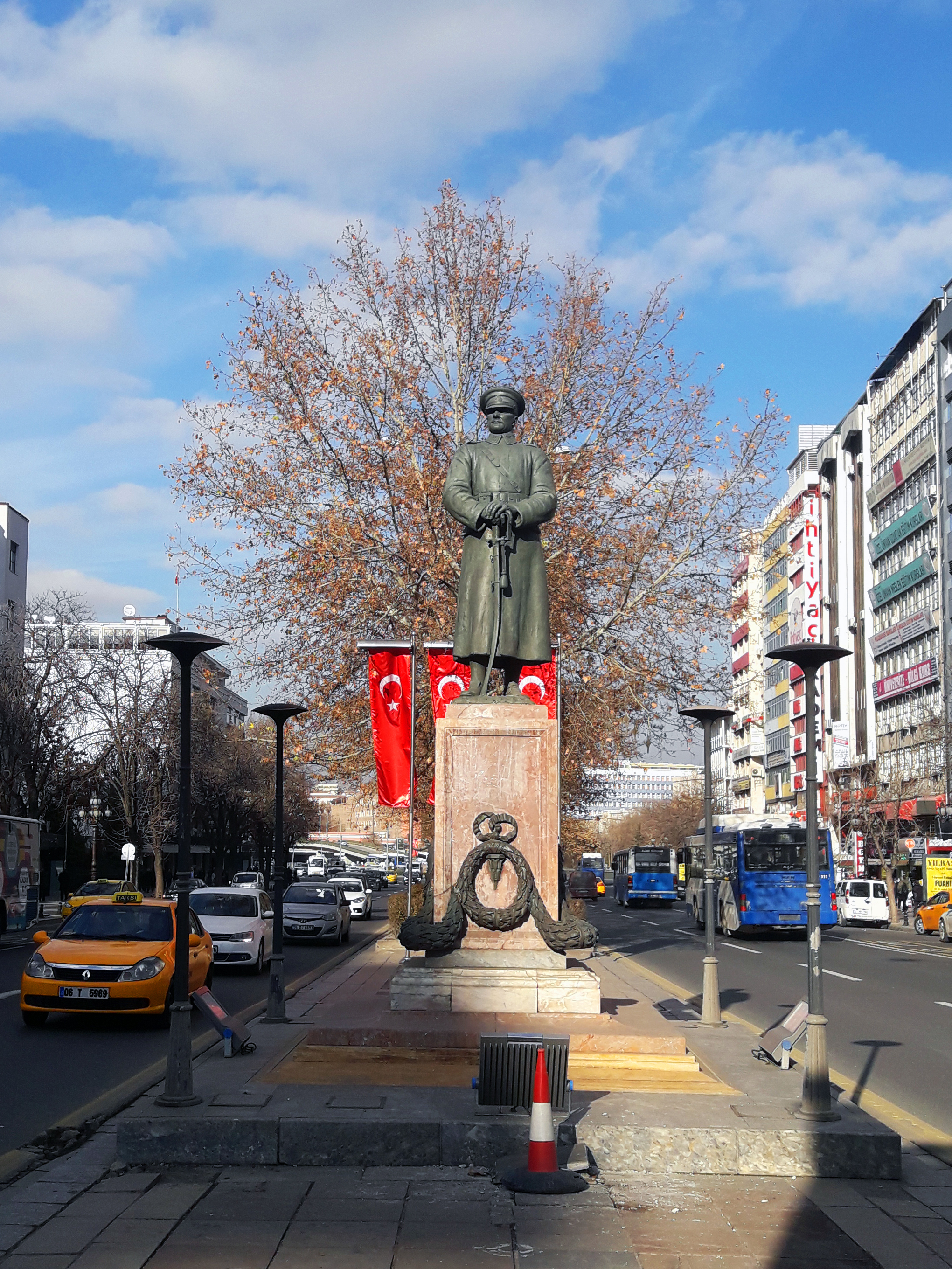
Marshal Mustafa Kemal Atatürk sculpture in Zafer square

Zafer Square (Turkish: Zafer Meydanı) is a square in Ankara, Turkey. Zafer means "victory". Although it is traditionally called square it is no longer a junction point.

The square is on Atatürk Boulevard at 39°55′29″N 32°51′17″E in Çankaya secondary municipality. It is between Kızılay Square and Sıhhiye Square. An underground bazaar of bookstores is to the east and an officers' club is to the west of the square. At the center of the Atatürk Boulevard there is a statue of Mustafa Kemal Atatürk (1881–1938), the founder of the Turkish Republic in marshal uniform. The monument was commissioned to Pietro Canonica, an Italian sculptor, who had also created several other monuments in Turkey. It was erected on 4 November 1927. The building material is bronze with a marble base. The height of the base is 2 m (6 ft 7 in) and the height of the statue 1.75 m (5 ft 9 in).
