= Jeremiah Azu =

British athlete (born 2001)

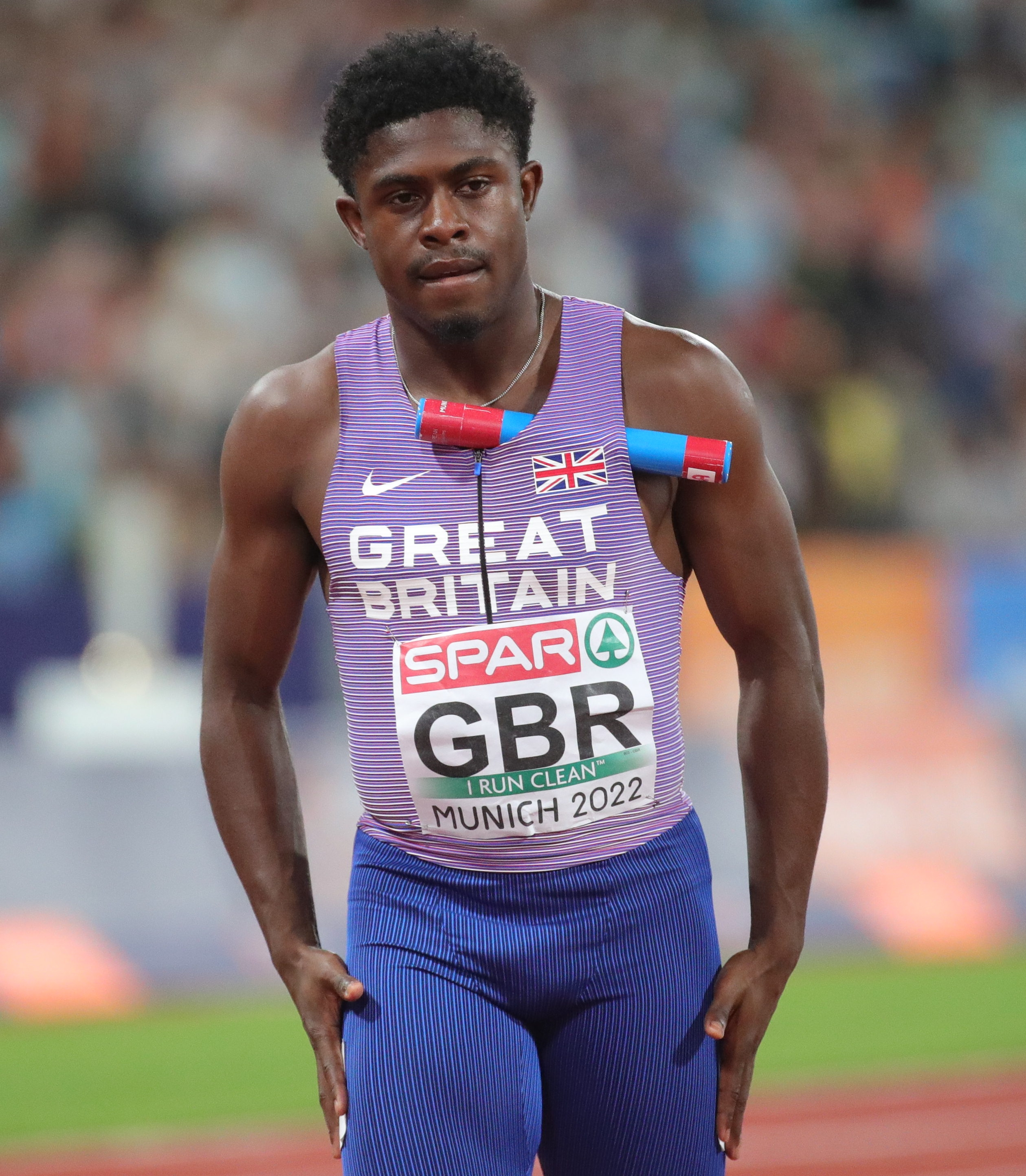
- Azu, 2022 in Munich

Personal information
- Nationality: British (Welsh)
- Born: 15 May 2001 (age 25) Rotterdam, The Netherlands
- Home town: Cardiff
- Children: 1

Sport
- Sport: Athletics
- Events: 60 m, 100 m, 200 m
- Club: Cardiff AAC
- Coached by: Helen James
Medal record
Men's athletics
Representing Great Britain
Olympic Games
Bronze medal – third place	2024 Paris	4 × 100 m relay
World Ultimate Championship
Third place	2026 Budapest	Mixed 4 × 100 m relay
World Indoor Championships
Gold medal – first place	2025 Nanjing	60 m
European Championships
Gold medal – first place	2022 Munich	4 × 100 m relay
Gold medal – first place	2026 Birmingham	4 × 100 m relay
Gold medal – first place	2026 Birmingham	4 × 100 m mixed relay
Silver medal – second place	2026 Birmingham	100 m
Bronze medal – third place	2022 Munich	100 m
European Indoor Championships
Gold medal – first place	2025 Apeldoorn	60 m
European Games
Bronze medal – third place	2023 Kraków-Małopolska	100 m
European U23 Championships
Gold medal – first place	2021 Tallinn	100 m
Gold medal – first place	2023 Espoo	100 m

Jeremiah Azu (born 15 May 2001) is a Welsh sprinter. He is the 2025 European Indoor Champion and 2025 World Indoor Champion over 60 metres. In 2024, he became the first Welshman to run the 100 metres in under 10 seconds in wind-legal conditions. Azu is a five-time British champion, three times indoors over 60 m, once indoors over 200 metres, and once outdoors over 100 metres and a European Champion in the 4 × 100 metre relay.

== Career ==
In 2022, Azu competed at the British Championships where he won the 100 metres in a wind-assisted time of 9.90 seconds. In his first senior international appearance, he won the bronze medal over 100 metres at the 2022 European Athletics Championships in a new personal best of 10.13 s, and a gold in the 4 × 100 metre relay at the same competition.

The following year, Azu made it to the final of the 60 m at the European Indoor Championships, where he finished 6th. In June, competing in the 100 metres in the 2023 European Athletics Team Championships, as part of the 2023 European Games, he won the bronze medal. At the European U23 Championships in Espoo, Azu won gold over the 100 m in a wind-assisted 10.05 s.

Azu become the first Welsh 100 m runner to break the 10-second barrier in wind-legal conditions clocking 9.97 at the True Athletes Classics in Leverkusen, Germany, on 25 May 2024. After winning the silver medal at the 2024 British Athletics Championships, Azu was subsequently named in the Great Britain team for the 2024 Summer Olympics. At the Games in Paris, he was disqualified in his 100-metre heat for a false start. However, he recovered to win a bronze medal in the 4 × 100 metres relay.

Azu won the gold medals in the 60 metres at the 2024 and 2025 British Indoor Athletics Championships, making him a three time national champion, once outdoors, twice indoors. Following his win in 2025, Azu competed at the European Indoor Championships, where he won gold in the 60 m in a new personal best of 6.49, his first time under the 6.50-barrier.

He won the gold medal in the 60 metres at the 2025 World Indoor Championships in China, equalling his personal best of 6.49 in the final.

On 11 August 2026, Azu ran a time of 10.16 seconds to win the silver medal behind teammate Romell Glave.in the 100 metres at the European Championships in Birmingham. Later in the championships, he won gold medals as part of both the men's 4 × 100 metres relay and 4 × 100 metres mixed relay teams.

== Personal life ==
Azu was born in the Netherlands, and raised in Wales. He is of Ghanaian descent. He became a father in March 2025.

Azu caused some controversy when he wore a head band written saying '100% Jesus' at the 2025 World Athletics Championships in Tokyo. The organization later told him not to wear the headband again. Azu comes from a devout Christian family, with his father being a pastor.

== Competition record ==
Year	Competition	Venue	Position	Event	Notes
Representing Great Britain and Wales
2017	Celtic Games		1st	100 m	
2018	Celtic Games		1st	100 m	
2018	Welsh Athletics Championships		1st	60 m	
2018	Welsh Athletics Championships		1st	200 m	
2019	Welsh Athletics Under 20 Championships		1st	60 m	
2019	England Under 20 Athletics Championships		1st	60 m	
2019	England Under 20 Athletics Championships		1st	200 m	
2019	British Athletics Indoor Championships	Birmingham, United Kingdom	3rd	60 m	
2019	European U20 Championships	Borås, Sweden		100 m	13.45
2019	European U23 Championships	Gävle, Sweden	7th	100 m	
2021	Manchester International Championships		1st	100 m	
2021	European U23 Championships	Tallinn, Estonia	1st	100 m	10.25
2021	European U23 Championships	Tallinn, Estonia	DNF	4 × 100 m relay	
2022	British Indoor Athletics Championships	Birmingham, United Kingdom	3rd	60 m	6.61
2022	Golden Spike	Ostrava, Czech Republic	1st	4 × 100 m relay	38.43
2022	British Athletics Championships	Manchester, United Kingdom	1st	100 m	9.90w
2022	Commonwealth Games	Birmingham, United Kingdom	5th	100 m	10.19
2022	European Athletics Championships	Munich, Germany	3rd	100 m	10.13
2023	European U23 Championships	Espoo, Finland	1st	100 m	10.04
2023	2023 European Athletics Team Championships	Chorzów, Poland	3rd	100 m	10.16
2024	British Indoor Athletics Championships	Birmingham, United Kingdom	1st	60 m	6.60
2024	British Athletics Championships	Manchester, United Kingdom	2nd	100 m	10.17
2024	2024 Olympic Games	Paris, France	DSQ	100 m	
2024	2024 Olympic Games	Paris, France	3rd	4 × 100 relay	
2025	British Indoor Athletics Championships	Birmingham, United Kingdom	1st	60 m	6.56
2025	European Athletics Indoor Championships	Apeldoorn, Netherlands	1st	60 m	6.49 PB
2025	World Athletics Indoor Championships	Nanjing, China	1st	60 m	6.49 =PB

== Personal bests ==
Outdoor

- 100 metres – 9.97 (Leverkusen, Germany 2024)
- 100 metres – 9.90 (+2.5 m/s, Manchester 2022)
- 200 metres – 20.96 (+0.3 m/s, Loughborough 2022)

Indoor

- 60 metres - 6.45 (World Championships 2026)
- 200 metres – 21.25 (Sheffield 2019)
