= Emre Zafer Barnes =

Jamaican-Turkish sprinter (born 1988)

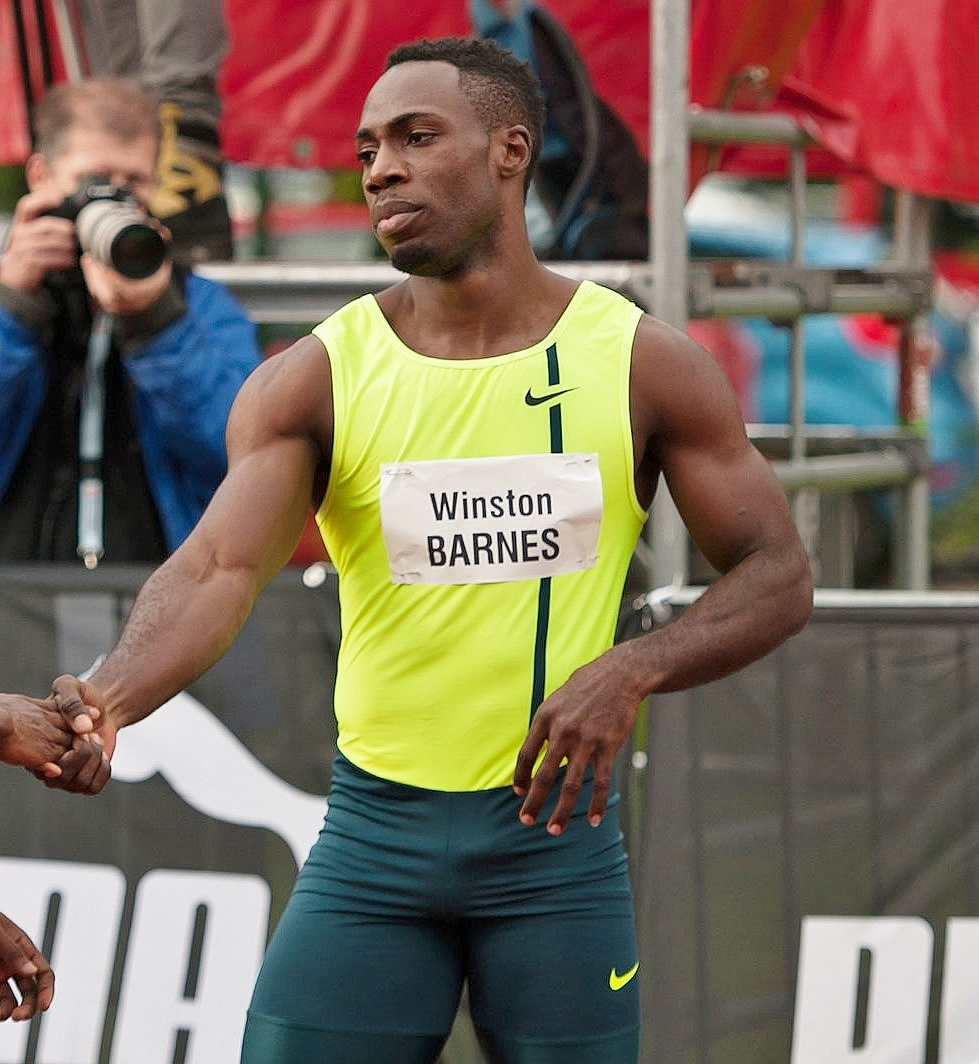
- Winston Barnes at the Salzburg Athletics Gala on 20 May 2015.

Personal information
- Nationality: Turkey
- Born: 7 November 1988 (age 37) Spanish Town, Jamaica
- Height: 1.78 m (5 ft 10 in)
- Weight: 73 kg (161 lb)

Sport
- Sport: Track and field
- Events: 100 m, 4x100 m relay
Medal record
Men's athletics
Representing Jamaica
World Junior Championships
Gold medal – first place	2006 Beijing	4×100 m relay
CARIFTA Games (Junior)
Gold medal – first place	2006 Les Abymes	4×100 m relay
CARIFTA Games (Youth)
Gold medal – first place	2004 Hamilton	4×100 m relay
Bronze medal – third place	2004 Hamilton	200 m
Representing Turkey
European Championships
Silver medal – second place	2018 Berlin	4×100 m relay
European Indoor Championships
Silver medal – second place	2019 Glasgow	60 m
Islamic Solidarity Games
Gold medal – first place	2021 Konya	4×100 m relay
Silver medal – second place	2017 Baku	4×100 m relay
Bronze medal – third place	2021 Konya	100 m
Mediterranean Games
Silver medal – second place	2018 Tarragona	100 m
Silver medal – second place	2018 Tarragona	4×100 m relay
Representing Europe
Continental Cup
Silver medal – second place	2018 Ostrava	4x100 m relay

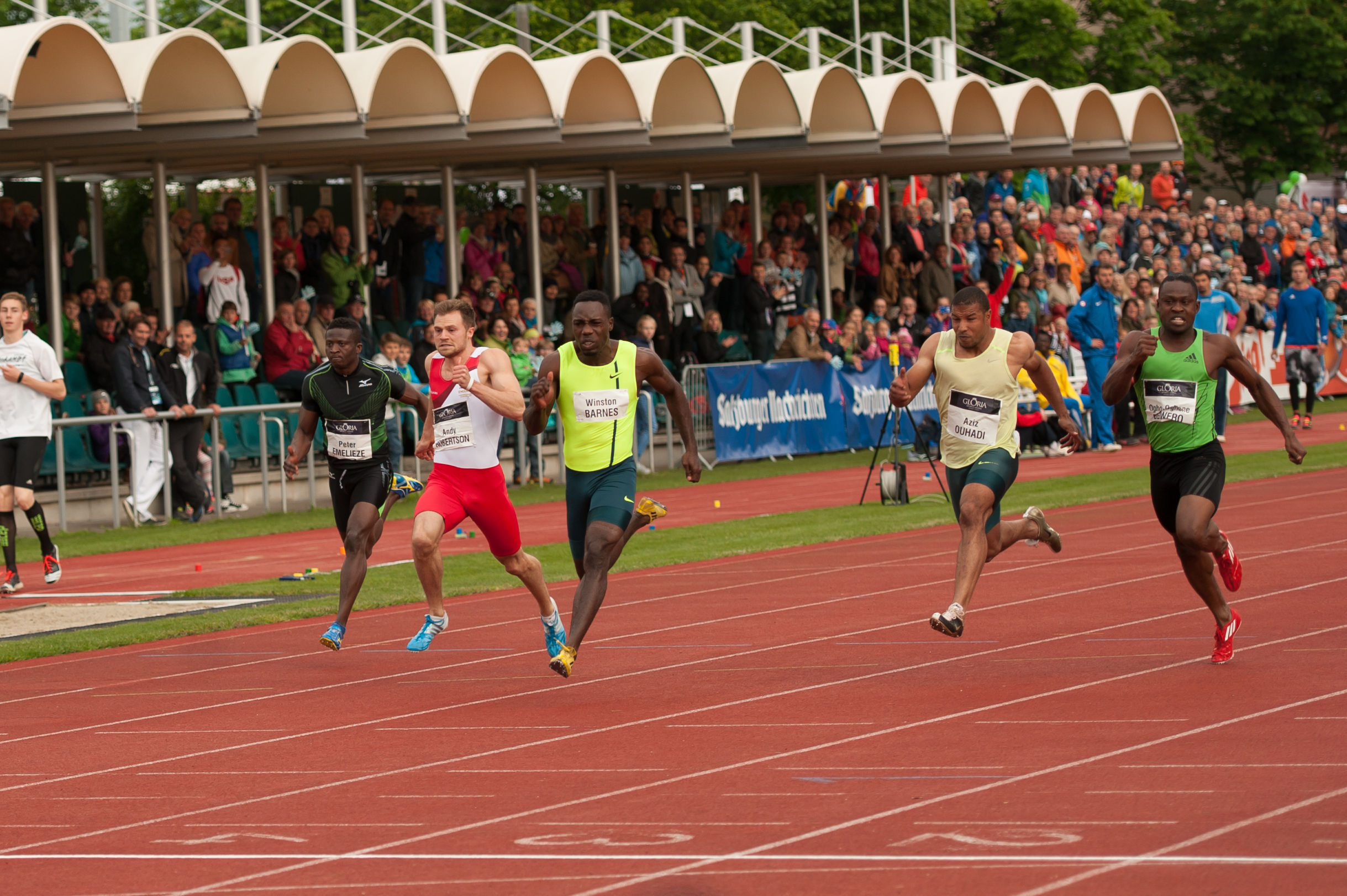
Winston Barnes on track at 2015 Salzburg Athletics Gala.

Emre Zafer Barnes (born Winston Barnes on 7 November 1988) is a Jamaica-born Turkish sprinter. Barnes won the 100 m race at the 2015 Salzburg Athletics Gala in Austria. Also at 2021 Islamic Solidarity Games he was awarded third place while he was in 4th place due to photo finish mistakes.

By July 2015, he switched allegiance to Turkey, and adopted the Turkish given name Emre Zafer. In his first season in Turkey, Barnes was the member of the team, which set a new Turkish record in 4 × 100 m relay in Erzurum.

He competed in the 100 m event at the 2016 Ricardo Romo Invitational of University of Texas at San Antonio, USA, and earned a quota spot for the 2016 Summer Olympics with his performance.

== Competition record ==
Following contains competitions with medal wins only:

Year	Competition	Venue	Position	Event	Notes
Representing Jamaica
2011	In'l di Atletica Leggera Sport Solidarieta	(Italy) Lignano	3rd	100 m	10.46
2011	Savo Games	(Finland) Lapinlahti	3rd	100 m	10.38
2013	Jamaica Int'l Invitational	(Jamaica) Kingston	3rd	100 m	10.36
2014	Queens Grace Jackson Track Meet	(Jamaica) St. Andrew	2nd	60 m	6.61
2014	JAAA All Comers Dev Meet #3	(Jamaica) St. Andrew	1st	100 m	10.17
2015	Meeting Caraibes Région	(Guadeloupe) Baie-Mahault	3rd	100 m	10.35
2015	Jamaica Int'l Invitational	(Jamaica) Kingston	1st	100 m	10.33
2015	Romanian Int'l Championship	Romania	1st	100 m	10.38
2015	Romanian Int'l Championship	Romania	1st	200 m	20.67
2015	Salzburger Leichtathletikgala	(Austria) Salzburg	1st	100 m	10.25
2015	Guldensporenmeeting	(Belgium) Kortrijk	3rd	100 m	10.30
2015	Galà dei Castelli	(Switzerland) Bellinzona	2nd	100 m	10.25
Representing Turkey
2016	2nd Int'l Sprint & Relay Challenge	(Turkey) Erzurum	3rd	100 m	10.17
2016	2nd Int'l Sprint & Relay Challenge	(Turkey) Erzurum	1st	4 × 100 m relay	38.31 NR
2016	2016 Olympics	(Brazil) Rio de Janeiro	4th (H1)	4 × 100 metres relay	38.30 NR
2017	European Team Championships	(France) Lille	2nd	100 m	10.36
2017	World Championships	(United Kingdom) London	18th (sf)	100 m	10.27
2017	World Championships	(United Kingdom) London	7th	4 × 100 m relay	38.73
2018	Continental Cup	(Czech Republic) Ostrava	2nd	100m	38.96
2018	Mediterranean Games	(Spain) Tarragona	2nd	100m	10.32
2018	Mediterranean Games	(Spain) Tarragona	2nd	4 × 100 meters relay	38.50
