= Kayhan Özer =

Turkish sprinter

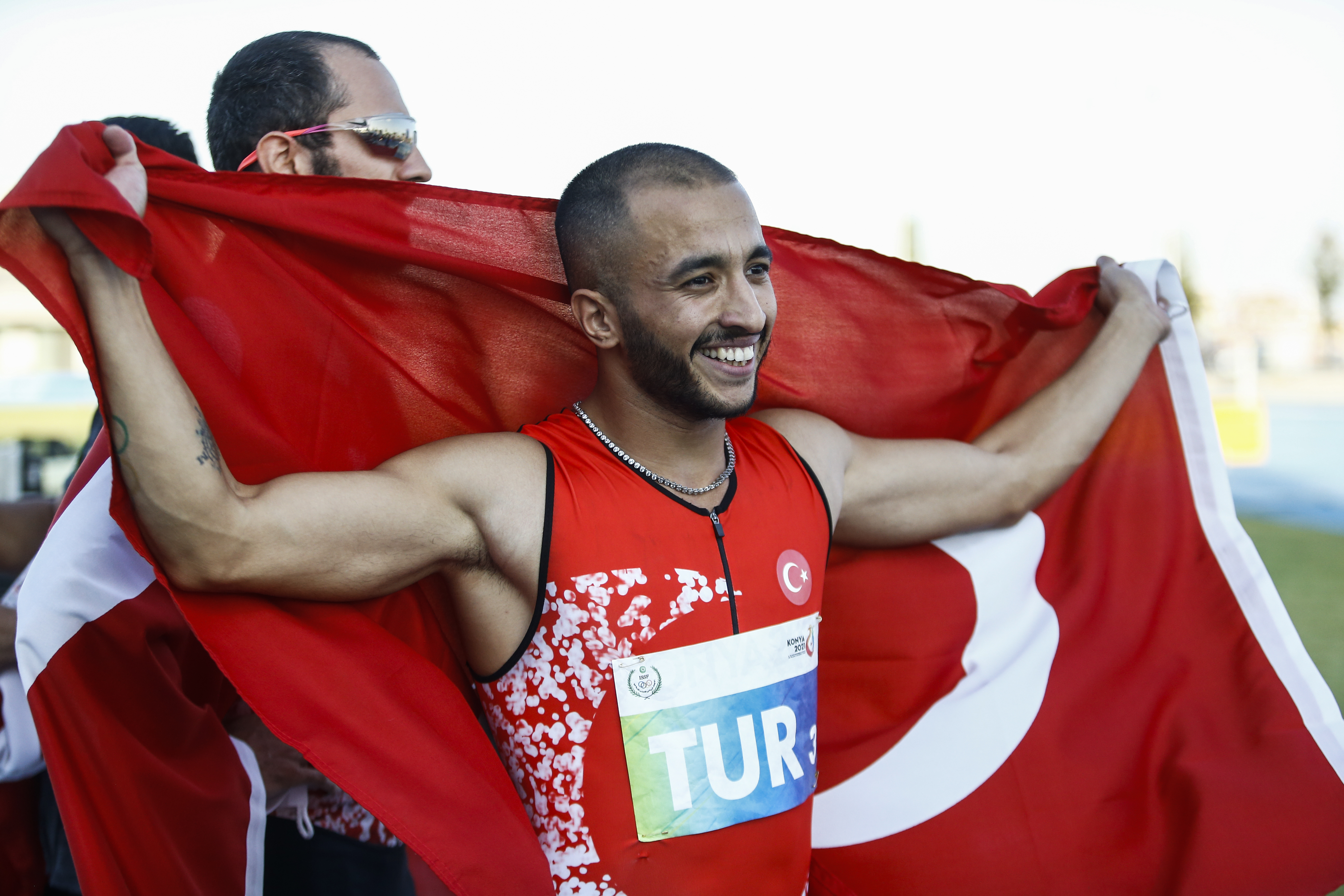
- Özer in 2022

Personal information
- Nationality: Turkish
- Born: 11 June 1998 (age 28) Adana, Turkey

Sport
- Sport: Athletics
- Event: 100 metres
Medal record
Men's athletics
Representing Turkey
Islamic Solidarity Games
Gold medal – first place	2021 Konya	4×100 m relay
Mediterranean Games
Silver medal – second place	2022 Oran	4×100 m relay
Silver medal – second place	2026 Taranto	4×100 m relay

Kayhan Özer (born 11 June 1998) is a Turkish athlete. He competed at the 2020 and 2024 Olympic Games.

== Career ==
Özer is a four-time gold medalist at the Balkan Athletics Championships, two-time gold medalist at the Balkan Indoor Athletics Championships, and also a gold medalist at the 2021 Islamic Solidarity Games.

He competed in the men's 4 × 100 metres relay event at the 2020 Summer Olympics.

In 2022, he raced against a sportscar and a motorcycle as a publicity stunt to promote the sport of athletics.

He competed in the 100 metres at the 2024 Paris Olympics.
