= 2022 European Athletics Championships – Men's 4 × 100 metres relay =

Men's 4 × 100 metres relay at the 2022 European Athletics Championships
- Venue: Olympiastadion
- Location: Munich
- Dates: 19 August (heats); 21 August (final)
- Competitors: 69 from 16 nations
- Winning time: 37.67

Medalists
gold medal	Jeremiah Azu; Zharnel Hughes; Jona Efoloko; Nethaneel Mitchell-Blake; Harry Aikines-Aryeetey*; Tommy Ramdhan*	Great Britain
silver medal	Méba-Mickaël Zeze; Pablo Matéo; Ryan Zeze; Jimmy Vicaut	France
bronze medal	Adrian Brzeziński; Przemysław Słowikowski; Patryk Wykrota; Dominik Kopeć; Mateusz Siuda*	Poland

The men's 4 × 100 metres relay at the 2022 European Athletics Championships took place at the Olympiastadion on 19 and 21 August.

== Records ==
Standing records prior to the 2022 European Athletics Championships
World record	Jamaica; Nesta Carter, Michael Frater; Yohan Blake, Usain Bolt	36.84	London, Great Britain	10 August 2012
European record	Great Britain; Adam Gemili, Zharnel Hughes; Richard Kilty, Nethaneel Mitchell-Blake	37.36	Doha, Qatar	5 October 2019
Championship record	France; Max Moriniere, Daniel Sangouma; Jean-Charles Trouabal, Bruno Marie-Rose	37.79	Split, Yugoslavia	1 September 1990
World Leading	Canada; Aaron Brown, Jerome Blake; Brendon Rodney, Andre De Grasse	37.48	Eugene, United States	23 July 2022
European Leading	Great Britain; Jona Efoloko, Zharnel Hughes; Nethaneel Mitchell-Blake, Reece Prescod	37.83	Eugene, United States	22 July 2022

== Schedule ==
Date	Time	Round
19 August 2022	10:00	Round 1
21 August 2022	21:12	Final

== Results ==
=== Round 1 ===
First 3 in each heat (Q) and 2 best performers (q) advance to the Final.

Rank	Heat	Lane	Nation	Athletes	Time	Notes
1	2	7	Germany	Kevin Kranz, Joshua Hartmann, Owen Ansah, Lucas Ansah-Peprah	37.97	Q, NR
2	2	6	France	Méba-Mickaël Zeze, Pablo Matéo, Ryan Zeze, Jimmy Vicaut	38.17	Q
3	1	5	Great Britain	Jeremiah Azu, Harry Aikines-Aryeetey, Jona Efoloko, Tommy Ramdhan	38.41	Q
4	2	4	Poland	Dominik Kopeć, Przemysław Słowikowski, Patryk Wykrota, Mateusz Siuda	38.60	Q, SB
5	2	5	Belgium	Robin Vanderbemden, Ward Merckx, Simon Verherstraeten, Kobe Vleminckx	38.73	q, NR
6	1	1	Netherlands	Elvis Afrifa, Taymir Burnet, Joris van Gool, Raphael Bouju	38.83	Q
7	3	3	Turkey	Emre Zafer Barnes, Jak Ali Harvey, Kayhan Özer, Ertan Özkan	38.98	q
8	2	1	Italy	Lorenzo Patta, Hillary Wanderson Polanco Rijo, Matteo Melluzzo, Chituru Ali	39.02	
9	1	7	Switzerland	Pascal Mancini, Bradley Lestrade, Felix Svensson, Daniel Löhrer	39.03	Q, SB
10	1	4	Greece	Konstadinos Zikos, Theodoros Vrontinos, Panayiotis Trivizas, Ioannis Nyfantopoulos	39.11	
11	1	6	Spain	Alberto Calero, Pablo Montalvo, Jesús Gómez, Sergio López	39.14	
12	2	2	Finland	Santeri Örn, Samuli Samuelsson, Oskari Lehtonen, Samuel Purola	39.37	
13	1	3	Czech Republic	Zdeněk Stromšík, Jiří Polák, Jan Jirka, David Kolář	39.41	
14	1	8	Ukraine	Serhiy Smelyk, Stanislav Kovalenko, Kyrylo Prykhodko, Andriy Vasyliev	39.62	SB
	2	8	Denmark	Rasmus Thornbjerg Klausen, Frederik Schou-Nielsen, Tobias Larsen, Tazana Kamanga-Dyrbak	DNF	
	1	2	Ireland	Israel Olatunde, Mark Smyth, Colin Doyle, Joseph Ojewumi	DNF	

=== Final ===
Rank	Lane	Nation	Athletes	Time	Notes
1st place, gold medalist(s)	4	Great Britain	Jeremiah Azu, Zharnel Hughes, Jona Efoloko, Nethaneel Mitchell-Blake	37.67	CR
2nd place, silver medalist(s)	6	France	Méba-Mickaël Zeze, Pablo Matéo, Ryan Zeze, Jimmy Vicaut	37.94	SB
3rd place, bronze medalist(s)	8	Poland	Adrian Brzeziński, Przemysław Słowikowski, Patryk Wykrota, Dominik Kopeć	38.15	NR
4	3	Netherlands	Elvis Afrifa, Taymir Burnet, Joris van Gool, Raphael Bouju	38.25	SB
5	7	Switzerland	Pascal Mancini, Bradley Lestrade, Felix Svensson, William Reais	38.36	NR
6	2	Belgium	Robin Vanderbemden, Ward Merckx, Jordan Paquot, Kobe Vleminckx	39.01	
7	1	Turkey	Emre Zafer Barnes, Jak Ali Harvey, Kayhan Özer, Ertan Özkan	39.20	
	5	Germany	Kevin Kranz, Joshua Hartmann, Owen Ansah, Lucas Ansah-Peprah	DNF	
