= 2026 European Athletics Championships – Men's 100 metres =

Men's 100 metres at the 2026 European Athletics Championships
- Venue: Alexander Stadium
- Location: Birmingham, United Kingdom
- Dates: 11 August 2026
- Competitors: 36 (target)
- Winning time: 10.09

Medalists
gold medal	Romell Glave	Great Britain
silver medal	Jeremiah Azu	Great Britain
bronze medal	Owen Ansah	Germany

Official Video Highlights

The men's 100 metres at the 2026 European Athletics Championships took place over three rounds at the Alexander Stadium in Birmingham, United Kingdom, on 11 August 2026.

== Background ==
Records before the 2026 European Athletics Championships
Record	Athlete (nation)	Time	Location	Date
World record	Usain Bolt (JAM)	9.58	Berlin, Germany	16 August 2009
European record	Lamont Marcell Jacobs (ITA)	9.80	Tokyo, Japan	1 August 2021
Championship record	Zharnel Hughes (GBR)	9.95	Berlin, Germany	7 August 2018
Championship record	Lamont Marcell Jacobs (ITA)	9.95	Munich, Germany	16 August 2022
World leading	Noah Lyles (USA)	9.79	New York City, United States	24 July 2026
European leading	Lamont Marcell Jacobs (ITA)	9.96	Paris, France	28 June 2026

== Qualification ==
For the men's 100 metres, the qualification period was from 27 July 2025 to 26 July 2026. Athletes qualified by running the entry standard of 10.15 or faster, by wildcard for the 2024 European Athletics Champion, or by their position on the World Athletics Rankings for the event. The target number was 36 athletes, yet eventually 37 qualified.

Qualification standings per 31 July 2026
QP	CP	Country	Athlete	PB	SB	Status	Details
1	1	Italy	Lamont Marcell Jacobs	9.80	9.96	Qualified by Wild Card	Defending European Champion
2	1	Great Britain & N.I.	Jeremiah Azu	9.97	10.00	Qualified by Entry Standard	9.97 - London Marathon Community Track, London (GBR) - 17 AUG 2025
3	2	Great Britain & N.I.	Romell Glave	9.97	9.97	Qualified by Entry Standard	9.97 - Olympic Stadium, London (GBR) - 18 JUL 2026
4	1	Germany	Owen Ansah	9.98	9.98	Qualified by Entry Standard	9.98 - Universitätsstadion Am Biopark, Regensburg (GER) - 06 JUN 2026
5	3	Great Britain & N.I.	Louie Hinchliffe	9.95	10.01	Qualified by Entry Standard	10.01 - Univ. of Arizona Roy P. Drachman Stadium, Tucson, AZ (USA) - 15 MAY 2026
reserve	4	Great Britain & N.I.	Elliot Jones	10.04	10.09	Qualified by Entry Standard	10.04 - London Marathon Community Track, London (GBR) - 17 AUG 2025
6	2	Germany	Heiko Gussmann	10.06	10.06	Qualified by Entry Standard	10.06 - Lohrheidestadion, Wattenscheid, Bochum (GER) - 25 JUL 2026
7	1	Netherlands	Elvis Afrifa	10.06	10.06	Qualified by Entry Standard	10.06 - FBK Stadium, Hengelo (NED) - 25 JUL 2026
8	1	Ireland	Israel Olatunde	10.08	10.41	Qualified by Entry Standard	10.08 - Lee Valley Athletics Centre, London (GBR) - 30 AUG 2025
9	1	Poland	Dominik Kopeć	10.05	10.08	Qualified by Entry Standard	10.08 - Zdzisław Krzyszkowiak Stadium, Bydgoszcz (POL) - 29 MAY 2026
10	2	Netherlands	Taymir Burnet	10.08	10.08	Qualified by Entry Standard	10.08 - FBK Stadium, Hengelo (NED) - 25 JUL 2026
reserve	5	Great Britain & N.I.	Nicholas Walsh	10.06	10.09	Qualified by Entry Standard	10.09 - London Marathon Community Track, London (GBR) - 25 MAY 2026
11	1	Slovenia	Anej Čurin Prapotnik	10.09	10.09	Qualified by Entry Standard	10.09 - Atletski stadion Poljane, Maribor (SLO) - 19 JUN 2026
12	2	Italy	Chituru Ali	9.96	10.09	Qualified by Entry Standard	10.09 - Cerritos College, Norwalk, CA (USA) - 11 JUL 2026
13	1	Spain	Abel Jordán	10.10	10.10	Qualified by Entry Standard	10.10 - John McDonnell Field, Fayetteville, AR (USA) - 29 MAY 2026
14	3	Germany	Kameron Horton	10.11	10.11	Qualified by Entry Standard	10.11 - Dean A. Hayes Track and Soccer Stadium, Murfreesboro, TN (USA) - 16 MAY 2026
15	1	Portugal	Delvis Santos	10.07	10.24	Qualified by Entry Standard	10.12 - Estádio 1º de Maio, Braga (POR) - 02 AUG 2025
reserve	4	Germany	Lucas Ansah-Peprah	10.00	10.15	Qualified by Entry Standard	10.13 - Stadion am Göldner, Sondershausen (GER) - 15 AUG 2025
reserve	5	Germany	Yannick Wolf	10.05	10.13	Qualified by Entry Standard	10.13 - Heinz-Steyer-Stadion, Dresden (GER) - 31 MAY 2026
16	1	San Marino	Francesco Sansovini	10.41	10.62	Qualified by Universality Place	
17	1	Bulgaria	Hristo Iliev	10.22	10.22	Qualified by World Rankings	12th - 1210 points
18	2	Ireland	Toluwabori Akinola	10.19	10.19	Qualified by World Rankings	14th - 1207 points
19	2	Spain	Guillem Crespí	10.18	10.19	Qualified by World Rankings	15th - 1207 points
20	1	Denmark	Simon Hansen	10.11	10.19	Qualified by World Rankings	18th - 1201 points
21	1	Sweden	Henrik Larsson	10.08	10.26	Qualified by World Rankings	19th - 1197 points
22	1	Belgium	Simon Verherstraeten	10.06	10.12	Qualified by World Rankings	21st - 1191 points
23	1	Hungary	Dominik Illovszky	10.25	10.33	Qualified by World Rankings	28th - 1175 points
reserve	6	Germany	Kevin Kranz	10.13	10.16	Qualified by World Rankings	29th - 1173 points
reserve	7	Germany	Robin Ganter	10.13	10.20	Qualified by World Rankings	30th - 1173 points
24	1	Finland	Riku Illukka	10.21	10.21	Qualified by World Rankings	32nd - 1169 points
25	1	Switzerland	Timothé Mumenthaler	10.13	10.19	Qualified by World Rankings	35th - 1164 points
26	1	Slovakia	Ján Volko	10.13	10.24	Qualified by World Rankings	39th - 1159 points
27	3	Italy	Samuele Ceccarelli	10.13	10.20	Qualified by World Rankings	40th - 1156 points
28	4	Italy	Filippo Randazzo	10.23	10.30	Qualified by World Rankings	41st - 1154 points
29	1	Lithuania	Adas Dambrauskas	10.26	10.26	Qualified by World Rankings	42nd - 1154 points
30	2	Belgium	Emiel Botterman	10.25	10.25	Qualified by World Rankings	45th - 1150 points
31	3	Belgium	Antoine Snyders	10.20	10.20	Qualified by World Rankings	48th - 1148 points
32	1	Turkey	Ertan Özkan	10.27	10.29	Qualified by World Rankings	51st - 1145 points
33	1	Norway	Per Tinius Fremstad-Waldron	10.32	10.33	Qualified by World Rankings	52nd - 1145 points
34	2	Turkey	Kayhan Özer	10.17	10.28	Qualified by World Rankings	55th - 1141 points
35	3	Spain	Jorge Hernández	10.22	10.22	Qualified by World Rankings	56th - 1140 points
reserve	5	Italy	Stephen Awuah Baffour	10.17	10.31	Qualified by World Rankings	61st - 1135 points
36	1	Austria	Markus Fuchs	10.08	10.32	Qualified by World Rankings	64th - 1133 points
37	1	Estonia	Henri Sai	10.32	10.32	Qualified by World Rankings	66th - 1132 points
reserve	1	Greece	Vasileios Myrianthopoulos	10.28	10.39	Next best by World Rankings	67th - 1130 points
reserve	2	Sweden	Jean-Christian Zirignon	10.31	10.31	Next best by World Rankings	71st - 1125 points
reserve	6	Italy	Eric Marek	10.20	10.20	Next best by World Rankings	72nd - 1125 points
reserve	2	Bulgaria	Nikola Karamanolov	10.32	10.35	Next best by World Rankings	74th - 1122 points
reserve	2	Norway	Jacob Vaula	10.36	10.61	Next best by World Rankings	85th - 1118 points
reserve	2	Austria	Lukas Pullnig	10.26	10.33	Next best by World Rankings	88th - 1116 points
reserve	2	Slovenia	Jernej Gumilar	10.23	10.38	Next best by World Rankings	89th - 1116 points
reserve	3	Sweden	Linus Pihl	10.35	10.35	Next best by World Rankings	93rd - 1112 points

Bye to semi-finals	Reserve activated	Withdrawal / reserve unused

== Schedule ==
Date	Time	Round
11 August 2026	11:15	Round 1
11 August 2026	20:32	Semi-finals
11 August 2026	21:47	Final

All times are local times (UTC+1)

== Results ==
=== Round 1 ===
Round 1 was held on 11 August 2026, at 11:15 in the morning. 12 best performers (q) advanced to the semi-finals.

==== Heat 1 ====
Place	Lane	Athlete	Nation	Time	Notes
1	8	Kayhan Özer	Turkey	10.51	q
2	4	Lucas Ansah-Peprah	Germany	10.52	q
3	7	Henrik Larsson	Sweden	10.55	q
4	6	Riku Illukka	Finland	10.57	
5	2	Antoine Snyders	Belgium	10.61	
6	3	Henri Sai	Estonia	10.66	
7	9	Filippo Randazzo	Italy	10.71	
8	5	Guillem Crespí	Spain	10.74	
				Wind: (−3.0 m/s)	

==== Heat 2 ====
Place	Lane	Athlete	Nation	Time	Notes
1	2	Toluwabori Akinola	Ireland	10.39	q
2	5	Simon Verherstraeten	Belgium	10.39	q
3	8	Adas Dambrauskas	Lithuania	10.57	q
4	6	Samuele Ceccarelli	Italy	10.58	
5	4	Jorge Hernández	Spain	10.62	
6	7	Hristo Iliev	Bulgaria	10.66	
7	3	Markus Fuchs	Austria	10.76	
8	9	Dominik Illovszky	Hungary	10.79	
				Wind: (−2.8 m/s)	

==== Heat 3 ====
Place	Lane	Athlete	Nation	Time	Notes
1	1	Emiel Botterman	Belgium	10.42	q
2	7	Timothé Mumenthaler	Switzerland	10.44	q
3	3	Simon Hansen	Denmark	10.46	q
4	2	Per Tinius Fremstad-Waldron	Norway	10.50	q
5	6	Ján Volko	Slovakia	10.53	q
6	5	Delvis Santos	Portugal	10.54	q
7	8	Abel Jordán	Spain	10.58	
8	4	Ertan Özkan	Turkey	10.73	
				Wind: (−1.0 m/s)	

=== Semi-finals ===
The semi-finals were held on 11 August 2026, at 20:32 in the evening. First 2 in each heat (Q) and the next 2 fastest (q) advanced to the final.

==== Heat 1 ====
Place	Lane	Athlete	Nation	Time	Notes
1	7	Romell Glave	Great Britain & N.I.	10.13	Q
2	4	Chituru Ali	Italy	10.34	Q
3	5	Heiko Gussmann	Germany	10.37	
4	3	Toluwabori Akinola	Ireland	10.38	
5	9	Emiel Botterman	Belgium	10.45	
6	2	Per Tinius Fremstad-Waldron	Norway	10.47	
7	8	Ján Volko	Slovakia	10.55 [.542]	
8	6	Taymir Burnet	Netherlands	10.55 [.548]	
				Wind: (−1.7 m/s)	

==== Heat 2 ====
Place	Lane	Athlete	Nation	Time	Notes
1	7	Jeremiah Azu	Great Britain & N.I.	10.17	Q
2	5	Owen Ansah	Germany	10.20	Q
3	4	Dominik Kopeć	Poland	10.32	R
4	3	Timothé Mumenthaler	Switzerland	10.36 [.353]	
5	6	Anej Čurin Prapotnik	Slovenia	10.36 [.355]	
5	2	Henrik Larsson	Sweden	10.36 [.355]	
7	8	Simon Hansen	Denmark	10.40	
—	9	Kayhan Özer	Turkey	DNS	
				Wind: (−0.5 m/s)	

==== Heat 3 ====
Place	Lane	Athlete	Nation	Time	Notes
1	4	Marcell Jacobs	Italy	10.08	Q
2	7	Elvis Afrifa	Netherlands	10.25	Q
3	5	Simon Verherstraeten	Belgium	10.27	q
4	6	Louie Hinchliffe	Great Britain & N.I.	10.30	q (Note: Did not proceed to the final due to injury . Replaced by next best qualifier, Dominik Kopeć.)
5	3	Riku Illukka	Finland	10.36	
6	2	Adas Dambrauskas	Lithuania	10.38	
7	9	Israel Olatunde	Ireland	10.49 [.485]	
8	8	Lucas Ansah-Peprah	Germany	10.49 [.488]	
				Wind: (−0.6 m/s)	

=== Final ===
The final was held on 11 August 2026, at 21:47 in the evening.

Place	Lane	Athlete	Nation	Time	Notes
1st place, gold medalist(s)	7	Romell Glave	Great Britain & N.I.	10.09	
2nd place, silver medalist(s)	4	Jeremiah Azu	Great Britain & N.I.	10.16	
3rd place, bronze medalist(s)	6	Owen Ansah	Germany	10.19	
4	3	Elvis Afrifa	Netherlands	10.22	
5	9	Dominik Kopeć	Poland	10.29	
6	8	Chituru Ali	Italy	10.34	
7	5	Marcell Jacobs	Italy	12.26	
8	2	Simon Verherstraeten	Belgium	13.12	
	9	Louie Hinchliffe	Great Britain & N.I.	DNS	
				Wind: (−0.4 m/s)	
