= 2024 Memorial Van Damme =

- Dates: 13–14 September 2024
- Host city: Brussels, Belgium
- Venue: King Baudouin Stadium
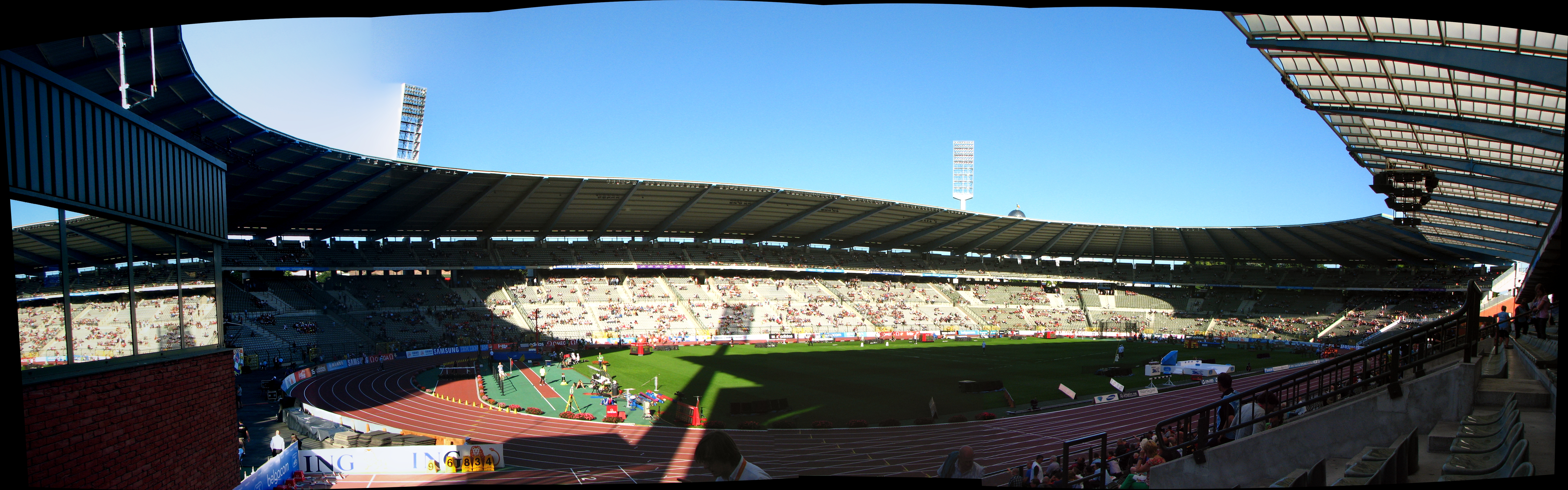
- Level: 2024 Diamond League

The 2024 Memorial Van Damme was the 48th edition of the annual outdoor track and field meeting in Brussels, Belgium. Held on 13–14 September at King Baudouin Stadium, it served as the finals of 2024 Diamond League – the highest-level international track and field circuit.

== Highlights ==
On night one, Olympic champion and World Record holder Armand Duplantis vaulted 6.11 metres to win the men's pole vault title, which was a meeting record, as was the 69.96m winning throw of Matthew Denny in the men's discus. Night two saw a further three meeting records set by Faith Kipyegon with 3:54.75 in the women's 1500 metres, Beatrice Chebet winning the women's 5000 metres in 14:09.82 and Leonardo Fabbri taking the men's shot put with an effort of 22.98 metres.

== Results ==
Whilst Diamond League points were used to gain entry into the finals, they were not used to determine Diamond League champions. Regardless of points accumulated throughout the season, winners of the 2024 Memorial Van Damme were crowned 2024 Diamond League champions in their respective events.

=== Diamond discipline ===
==== Men's events ====
Men's 100 Metres (+0.1 m/s)
Rank	Athlete	Nation	Time
1st place, gold medalist(s)	Ackeem Blake	Jamaica	9.93
2nd place, silver medalist(s)	Christian Coleman	United States	10.00
3rd place, bronze medalist(s)	Fred Kerley	United States	10.01
4	Emmanuel Eseme	Cameroon	10.09
5	Akani Simbine	South Africa	10.10 (.093)
6	Abdul Hakim Sani Brown	Japan	10.10 (.097)
7	Brandon Hicklin	United States	10.13
8	Rohan Watson	Jamaica	10.25

Men's 200 Metres (+0.7 m/s)
Rank	Athlete	Nation	Time
1st place, gold medalist(s)	Kenneth Bednarek	United States	19.67
2nd place, silver medalist(s)	Letsile Tebogo	Botswana	19.80
3rd place, bronze medalist(s)	Alexander Ogando	Dominican Republic	19.97
4	Courtney Lindsey	United States	20.21 (.201)
5	Fred Kerley	United States	20.21 (.204)
6	Kyree King	United States	20.45
7	Joseph Fahnbulleh	Liberia	20.53
8	Ryan Zeze	France	21.20

Men's 400 Metres
Rank	Athlete	Nation	Time
1st place, gold medalist(s)	Charlie Dobson	Great Britain	44.49
2nd place, silver medalist(s)	Kirani James	Grenada	44.63
3rd place, bronze medalist(s)	Muzala Samukonga	Zambia	44.69
4	Vernon Norwood	United States	44.78
5	Bayapo Ndori	Botswana	45.59
6	Jonathan Sacoor	Belgium	45.93
7	Busang Kebinatshipi	Botswana	46.43
8	Matthew Hudson-Smith	Great Britain	2:37.21

Men's 800 Metres
Rank	Athlete	Nation	Time
1st place, gold medalist(s)	Emmanuel Wanyonyi	Kenya	1:42.70
2nd place, silver medalist(s)	Djamel Sedjati	Algeria	1:42.86
3rd place, bronze medalist(s)	Marco Arop	Canada	1:43.25
4	Gabriel Tual	France	1:43.67
5	Eliott Crestan	Belgium	1:43.74
6	Wycliffe Kinyamal	Kenya	1:44.00
7	Andreas Kramer	Sweden	1:44.30
8	Tshepiso Masalela	Botswana	1:43.74
9	Ben Pattison	Great Britain	1:44.64

Men's 1500 Metres
Rank	Athlete	Nation	Time
1st place, gold medalist(s)	Jakob Ingebrigtsen	Norway	3:30.37
2nd place, silver medalist(s)	Timothy Cheruiyot	Kenya	3:30.93
3rd place, bronze medalist(s)	Cole Hocker	United States	3:30.94
4	Azeddine Habz	France	3:31.97
5	Jochem Vermeulen	Belgium	3:32.15
6	Yared Nuguse	United States	3:32.30
7	Reynold Cheruiyot	Kenya	3:32.50
8	Narve Gilje Nordås	Norway	3:33.02
9	Brian Komen	Kenya	3:33.21
10	Oliver Hoare	Australia	3:34.13
11	Elliot Giles	Great Britain	3:34.76

Men's 5000 Metres
Rank	Athlete	Nation	Time
1st place, gold medalist(s)	Berihu Aregawi	Ethiopia	12:43.66
2nd place, silver medalist(s)	Hagos Gebrhiwet	Ethiopia	12:44.25
3rd place, bronze medalist(s)	Telahun Haile Bekele	Ethiopia	12:45.63
4	Nicholas Kipkorir	Kenya	12:49.59
5	Yomif Kejelcha	Ethiopia	12:51.21
6	Isaac Kimeli	Belgium	12:58.16
7	Jacob Krop	Kenya	13:02.35
8	Cornelius Kemboi	Kenya	13:05.92
9	Dominic Lokinyomo Lobalu	Switzerland	13:09.23
10	Ronald Kwemoi	Kenya	13:35.84
—	Stewart McSweyn	Australia	DNF

Men's 110 Metres hurdles (+0.4 m/s)
Rank	Athlete	Nation	Time
1st place, gold medalist(s)	Sasha Zhoya	France	13.16
2nd place, silver medalist(s)	Lorenzo Simonelli	Italy	13.22
3rd place, bronze medalist(s)	Freddie Crittenden	United States	13.24
4	Cordell Tinch	United States	13.27
5	Michael Obasuyi	Belgium	13.31
6	Shunsuke Izumiya	Japan	13.33
7	Eric Edwards Jr.	United States	13.35
8	Daniel Roberts	United States	13.44

Men's 400 Metres hurdles
Rank	Athlete	Nation	Time
1st place, gold medalist(s)	Alison dos Santos	Brazil	47.93
2nd place, silver medalist(s)	Abderrahman Samba	Qatar	48.20
3rd place, bronze medalist(s)	Rasmus Mägi	Estonia	48.26
4	CJ Allen	United States	48.68
5	Roshawn Clarke	Jamaica	49.08
6	Malik James-King	Jamaica	49.37
7	Gerald Drummond	Costa Rica	49.63
8	Wilfried Happio	France	50.19

Men's 3000 Metres steeplechase
Rank	Athlete	Nation	Time
1st place, gold medalist(s)	Amos Serem	Kenya	8:06.90
2nd place, silver medalist(s)	Soufiane El Bakkali	Morocco	8:08.60
3rd place, bronze medalist(s)	Mohamed Amin Jhinaoui	Tunisia	8:09.93
4	Abraham Kibiwot	Kenya	8:10.51
5	Daniel Arce	Spain	8:10.88
6	Mohamed Tindouft	Tunisia	8:10.93
7	Getnet Wale	Ethiopia	8:14.66
8	Samuel Firewu	Ethiopia	8:15.86
9	Avinash Mukund Sable	India	8:17.09
10	Abrham Sime	Ethiopia	8:17.75

Men's High jump
Rank	Athlete	Nation	Mark
1st place, gold medalist(s)	Gianmarco Tamberi	Italy	2.34 m
2nd place, silver medalist(s)	Oleh Doroshchuk	Ukraine	2.31 m
3rd place, bronze medalist(s)	Woo Sang-hyeok	South Korea	2.25 m
4	Romaine Beckford	Jamaica	2.22 m
5	Thomas Carmoy	Belgium	2.22 m
6	Shelby McEwen	United States	2.12 m

Men's Pole vault
Rank	Athlete	Nation	Mark
1st place, gold medalist(s)	Armand Duplantis	Sweden	6.11 m
2nd place, silver medalist(s)	Emmanouil Karalis	Greece	5.82 m
3rd place, bronze medalist(s)	Ben Broeders	Belgium	5.82 m
4	Sam Kendricks	United States	5.82 m
5	Thibaut Collet	France	5.62 m
6	Christopher Nilsen	United States	5.62 m
7	KC Lightfoot	United States	5.62 m

Men's Long jump
Rank	Athlete	Nation	Mark
1st place, gold medalist(s)	Tajay Gayle	Jamaica	8.28 m (+0.4 m/s)
2nd place, silver medalist(s)	Simon Ehammer	Switzerland	8.16 m (+0.4 m/s)
3rd place, bronze medalist(s)	Miltiadis Tentoglou	Greece	8.15 m (+0.2 m/s)
4	Mattia Furlani	Italy	7.88 m (+0.3 m/s)
5	Carey McLeod	Jamaica	7.85 m (±0.0 m/s)
6	Wayne Pinnock	Jamaica	7.43 m (−0.3 m/s)

Men's Triple jump
Rank	Athlete	Nation	Mark
1st place, gold medalist(s)	Pedro Pichardo	Portugal	17.83 m (+0.4 m/s)
2nd place, silver medalist(s)	Max Heß	Germany	17.20 m (+0.3 m/s)
3rd place, bronze medalist(s)	Hugues Fabrice Zango	Burkina Faso	17.05 m (+0.1 m/s)
4	Almir dos Santos	Brazil	16.79 m (+0.3 m/s)
5	Lázaro Martínez	Cuba	16.23 m (±0.0 m/s)
6	Jean-Marc Pontvianne	France	16.01 m (+0.1 m/s)

Men's Shot put
Rank	Athlete	Nation	Mark
1st place, gold medalist(s)	Leonardo Fabbri	Italy	22.98 m
2nd place, silver medalist(s)	Ryan Crouser	United States	22.79 m
3rd place, bronze medalist(s)	Rajindra Campbell	Jamaica	21.95 m
4	Payton Otterdahl	United States	21.48 m
5	Chukwuebuka Enekwechi	Nigeria	21.29 m
—	Joe Kovacs	United States	NM

Men's Discus throw
Rank	Athlete	Nation	Time
1st place, gold medalist(s)	Matthew Denny	Australia	69.96 m
2nd place, silver medalist(s)	Mykolas Alekna	Lithuania	68.86 m
3rd place, bronze medalist(s)	Lukas Weißhaidinger	Austria	66.52 m
4	Daniel Ståhl	Sweden	66.26 m
5	Kristjan Čeh	Slovenia	65.40 m
6	Philip Milanov	Belgium	62.21 m
7	Fedrick Dacres	Jamaica	61.63 m

Men's Javelin throw
Rank	Athlete	Nation	Time
1st place, gold medalist(s)	Anderson Peters	Grenada	87.87 m
2nd place, silver medalist(s)	Neeraj Chopra	India	87.86 m
3rd place, bronze medalist(s)	Julian Weber	Germany	85.97 m
4	Andrian Mardare	Moldova	82.79 m
5	Roderick Genki Dean	Japan	80.37 m
6	Artur Felfner	Ukraine	79.86 m
7	Timothy Herman	Belgium	76.46 m

==== Women's events ====
Women's 100 Metres (+0.2 m/s)
Rank	Athlete	Nation	Time
1st place, gold medalist(s)	Julien Alfred	Saint Lucia	10.88
2nd place, silver medalist(s)	Dina Asher-Smith	Great Britain	10.92
3rd place, bronze medalist(s)	Marie-Josée Ta Lou	Ivory Coast	11.05
4	Daryll Neita	Great Britain	11.14
5	Patrizia van der Weken	Luxembourg	11.16
6	Gina Bass	Gambia	11.19
7	Tamari Davis	United States	11.21
8	Sha'Carri Richardson	United States	11.23
9	Rani Rosius	Belgium	11.37

Women's 200 Metres (+0.2 m/s)
Rank	Athlete	Nation	Time
1st place, gold medalist(s)	Brittany Brown	United States	22.20
2nd place, silver medalist(s)	Daryll Neita	Great Britain	22.45
3rd place, bronze medalist(s)	Anavia Battle	United States	22.61
4	Tasa Jiya	Netherlands	22.95
5	Tamara Clark	United States	23.01
6	Amy Hunt	Great Britain	23.09
7	Maboundou Koné	Ivory Coast	23.33
—	Marie-Josée Ta Lou	Ivory Coast	DQ

Women's 400 Metres
Rank	Athlete	Nation	Time
1st place, gold medalist(s)	Marileidy Paulino	Dominican Republic	49.45
2nd place, silver medalist(s)	Alexis Holmes	United States	50.32
3rd place, bronze medalist(s)	Rhasidat Adeleke	Ireland	50.96
4	Lynna Irby	United States	51.50
5	Lieke Klaver	Netherlands	51.69
6	Amandine Brossier	France	51.94
7	Sada Williams	Barbados	52.68
—	Salwa Eid Naser	Bahrain	DQ

Women's 800 Metres
Rank	Athlete	Nation	Time
1st place, gold medalist(s)	Mary Moraa	Kenya	1:56.56
2nd place, silver medalist(s)	Georgia Bell	Great Britain	1:57.50
3rd place, bronze medalist(s)	Natoya Goule-Toppin	Jamaica	1:58.94
4	Rénelle Lamote	France	1:58.94
5	Jemma Reekie	Great Britain	1:59.13
6	Habitam Alemu	Ethiopia	1:59.81
7	Halimah Nakaayi	Uganda	1:59.87
8	Prudence Sekgodiso	South Africa	2:03.16

Women's 1500 Metres
Rank	Athlete	Nation	Time
1st place, gold medalist(s)	Faith Kipyegon	Kenya	3:54.75
2nd place, silver medalist(s)	Diribe Welteji	Ethiopia	3:55.25
3rd place, bronze medalist(s)	Jessica Hull	Australia	3:56.99
4	Freweyni Hailu	Ethiopia	3:57.26
5	Nelly Chepchirchir	Kenya	3:58.05
6	Georgia Griffith	Australia	3:58.40
7	Georgia Bell	Great Britain	3:58.95
8	Birke Haylom	Ethiopia	3:59.27
9	Melissa Courtney-Bryant	Great Britain	3:59.75
10	Worknesh Mesele	Ethiopia	4:00.19
11	Elise Vanderelst	Belgium	4:01.26

Women's 5000 Metres
Rank	Athlete	Nation	Time
1st place, gold medalist(s)	Beatrice Chebet	Kenya	14:09.82
2nd place, silver medalist(s)	Medina Eisa	Ethiopia	14:21.89
3rd place, bronze medalist(s)	Fotyen Tesfay	Ethiopia	14:28.53
4	Ejgayehu Taye	Ethiopia	14:29.70
5	Caroline Nyaga	Kenya	14:30.14
6	Nozomi Tanaka	Japan	14:30.14
7	Melknat Wudu	Ethiopia	14:36.65
8	Karissa Schweizer	United States	14:36.88
9	Tsigie Gebreselama	Ethiopia	14:49.79

Women's 100 Metres hurdles (+0.4 m/s)
Rank	Athlete	Nation	Time
1st place, gold medalist(s)	Jasmine Camacho-Quinn	Puerto Rico	12.38
2nd place, silver medalist(s)	Nadine Visser	Netherlands	12.54
3rd place, bronze medalist(s)	Ackera Nugent	Jamaica	12.55
4	Grace Stark	United States	12.59
5	Danielle Williams	Jamaica	12.62
6	Tonea Marshall	United States	12.71
7	Cyréna Samba-Mayela	France	12.78
8	Pia Skrzyszowska	Poland	13.16

Women's 400 Metres hurdles
Rank	Athlete	Nation	Time
1st place, gold medalist(s)	Femke Bol	Netherlands	52.45
2nd place, silver medalist(s)	Anna Cockrell	United States	53.71
3rd place, bronze medalist(s)	Shiann Salmon	Jamaica	53.99
4	Shamier Little	United States	55.26
5	Ayomide Folorunso	Italy	55.37
6	Paulien Couckuyt	Belgium	55.66
7	Janieve Russell	Jamaica	55.94
8	Andrenette Knight	Jamaica	56.70

Women's 3000 Metres steeplechase
Rank	Athlete	Nation	Time
1st place, gold medalist(s)	Faith Cherotich	Kenya	9:02.36
2nd place, silver medalist(s)	Winfred Yavi	Bahrain	9:02.87
3rd place, bronze medalist(s)	Peruth Chemutai	Uganda	9:07.60
4	Gesa Felicitas Krause	Germany	9:08.94
5	Gabrielle Jennings	United States	9:09.89
6	Marwa Bouzayani	Tunisia	9:10.19
7	Valerie Constien	United States	9:13.31
8	Lea Meyer	Germany	9:22.71
9	Olivia Markezich	United States	9:27.98
10	Lomi Muleta	Ethiopia	9:52.35
—	Olivia Gürth	Germany	DNF

Women's High jump
Rank	Athlete	Nation	Mark
1st place, gold medalist(s)	Yaroslava Mahuchikh	Ukraine	1.97 m
2nd place, silver medalist(s)	Nicola Olyslagers	Australia	1.97 m
3rd place, bronze medalist(s)	Iryna Herashchenko	Ukraine	1.92 m
4	Eleanor Patterson	Australia	1.88 m
5	Angelina Topić	Serbia	1.88 m
6	Lia Apostolovski	Slovenia	1.88 m

Women's Pole vault
Rank	Athlete	Nation	Mark
1st place, gold medalist(s)	Nina Kennedy	Australia	4.88 m
2nd place, silver medalist(s)	Sandi Morris	United States	4.80 m
3rd place, bronze medalist(s)	Alysha Newman	Canada	4.80 m
4	Molly Caudery	Great Britain	4.80 m
5	Angelica Moser	Switzerland	4.70 m
6	Roberta Bruni	Italy	4.65 m
7	Elien Vekemans	Belgium	4.40 m

Women's Long jump
Rank	Athlete	Nation	Mark
1st place, gold medalist(s)	Larissa Iapichino	Italy	6.80 m (±0.0 m/s)
2nd place, silver medalist(s)	Monae' Nichols	United States	6.68 m (±0.0 m/s)
3rd place, bronze medalist(s)	Jasmine Moore	United States	6.61 m (±0.0 m/s)
4	Quanesha Burks	United States	6.56 m (+0.1 m/s)
5	Milica Gardašević	Serbia	6.40 m (−0.1 m/s)
6	Marthe Koala	Burkina Faso	6.39 m (±0.0 m/s)

Women's Triple jump
Rank	Athlete	Nation	Mark
1st place, gold medalist(s)	Leyanis Pérez	Cuba	14.37 m (−0.1 m/s)
2nd place, silver medalist(s)	Shanieka Ricketts	Jamaica	14.22 m (±0.0 m/s)
3rd place, bronze medalist(s)	Ackelia Smith	Jamaica	14.11 m (−0.2 m/s)
4	Neja Filipič	Slovenia	14.04 m (+0.1 m/s)
5	Jasmine Moore	United States	13.89 m (−0.1 m/s)
6	Dariya Derkach	Italy	13.45 m (+0.1 m/s)

Women's Shot put
Rank	Athlete	Nation	Mark
1st place, gold medalist(s)	Sarah Mitton	Canada	20.25 m
2nd place, silver medalist(s)	Chase Jackson	United States	19.90 m
3rd place, bronze medalist(s)	Yemisi Ogunleye	Germany	19.72 m
4	Maddi Wesche	New Zealand	19.65 m
5	Danniel Thomas-Dodd	Jamaica	19.24 m
6	Song Jiayuan	China	19.00 m

Women's Discus throw
Rank	Athlete	Nation	Mark
1st place, gold medalist(s)	Valarie Allman	United States	68.47 m
2nd place, silver medalist(s)	Feng Bin	China	67.49 m
3rd place, bronze medalist(s)	Yaime Pérez	Cuba	66.96 m
4	Sandra Elkasević	Croatia	65.10 m
5	Jorinde van Klinken	Netherlands	64.38 m
6	Kristin Pudenz	Germany	57.74 m

Women's Javelin throw
Rank	Athlete	Nation	Time
1st place, gold medalist(s)	Haruka Kitaguchi	Japan	66.13 m
2nd place, silver medalist(s)	Adriana Vilagoš	Serbia	65.23 m
3rd place, bronze medalist(s)	Maggie Malone-Hardin	United States	62.40 m
4	Victoria Hudson	Austria	62.30 m
5	Mackenzie Little	Australia	61.50 m
6	Flor Ruiz	Colombia	54.59 m

=== Promotional events ===
==== Men's ====
Men's 100 Metres (±0.0 m/s)
Rank	Athlete	Nation	Time
1st place, gold medalist(s)	Ferdinand Omanyala	Kenya	10.07
2nd place, silver medalist(s)	Kobe Vleminckx	Belgium	10.29
3rd place, bronze medalist(s)	Joshua Hartmann	Germany	10.30
4	Simon Verherstraeten	Belgium	10.33
5	Micheal Campbell	Jamaica	10.40
6	Elvis Afrifa	Netherlands	10.52
7	Antoine Snyders	Belgium	10.65
8	Ibrahim Camara	Belgium	10.80

Men's 400 Metres
Rank	Athlete	Nation	Time
1st place, gold medalist(s)	Daniel Segers	Belgium	45.38
2nd place, silver medalist(s)	Dylan Borlée	Belgium	45.59
3rd place, bronze medalist(s)	Florent Mabille	Belgium	45.80
4	Efekemo Okoro	Great Britain	46.19
5	Rusheen McDonald	Jamaica	46.71
6	Kevin Borlée	Belgium	47.18

==== Women's ====
Women's 200 Metres (+0.1 m/s)
Rank	Athlete	Nation	Time
1st place, gold medalist(s)	Sydney McLaughlin-Levrone	United States	22.40
2nd place, silver medalist(s)	Gina Mariam Bass Bittaye	Gambia	23.01
3rd place, bronze medalist(s)	Delphine Nkansa	Belgium	23.03
4	Boglárka Takács	Hungary	23.05
5	Lynna Irby-Jackson	United States	23.34
6	Maja Mihalinec Zidar	Slovenia	23.37
7	Rani Rosius	Belgium	23.56

Women's 400 Metres
Rank	Athlete	Nation	Time
1st place, gold medalist(s)	Sydney McLaughlin-Levrone	United States	49.11
2nd place, silver medalist(s)	Stacey-Ann Williams	Jamaica	50.53
3rd place, bronze medalist(s)	Andrea Miklós	Romania	51.16
4	Stephenie Ann McPherson	Jamaica	51.24
5	Hanne Claes	Belgium	52.03
6	Helena Ponette	Belgium	53.08
7	Rebecca Borga	Italy	54.25
