= 2025 World Athletics Championships – Men's 4 × 100 metres relay =

Men's 4 × 100 metres relay at the 2025 World Athletics Championships
- Venue: National Stadium
- Location: Tokyo, Japan
- Date: 20 September (heats); 21 September (final)
- Competitors: 70 from 16 nations
- Winning time: 37.29 WL

Medalists
gold medal	Christian Coleman; Kenny Bednarek; Courtney Lindsey; Noah Lyles; Ronnie Baker*; Trayvon Bromell*; T'Mars McCallum*	United States
silver medal	Aaron Brown; Jerome Blake; Brendon Rodney; Andre De Grasse	Canada
bronze medal	Nsikak Ekpo; Taymir Burnet; Xavi Mo-Ajok; Elvis Afrifa	Netherlands

The men's 4 × 100 metres relay at the 2025 World Athletics Championships was held at the National Stadium in Tokyo on 20 and 21 September 2025.

== Records ==
Before the competition, records were as follows:

Record	Athlete & Nat.	Perf.	Location	Date
World record	Jamaica; Nesta Carter, Michael Frater, Yohan Blake, Usain Bolt	36.84	London, United Kingdom	11 August 2012
Championships record	Jamaica; Nesta Carter, Michael Frater, Yohan Blake, Usain Bolt	37.04	Daegu, South Korea	4 September 2011
World Leading	South Africa; Bayanda Walaza, Sinesipho Dambile, Bradley Nkoana, Akani Simbine	37.61	Guangzhou, China	11 May 2025
African Record	South Africa; Bayanda Walaza, Shaun Maswanganyi, Bradley Nkoana, Akani Simbine	37.65	Paris, France	9 August 2024
European Record	Great Britain; Adam Gemili, Zharnel Hughes, Richard Kilty, Nethaneel Mitchell-Blake	37.37	Doha, Qatar	5 October 2019
Asian Record	Japan; Shuhei Tada, Kirara Shiraishi, Yoshihide Kiryu, Abdul Hakim Sani Brown	37.43	Doha, Qatar	5 October 2019
North, Central American and Caribbean record	Jamaica; Nesta Carter, Michael Frater, Yohan Blake, Usain Bolt	36.84	London, United Kingdom	11 August 2012
Oceanian record	Australia; Lachlan Kennedy, Joshua Azzopardi, Christopher Ius, Calab Law	37.87	Sydney, Australia	15 March 2025
South American Record	Brazil; Rodrigo do Nascimento, Vitor Hugo dos Santos, Derick Silva, Paulo André Camilo	37.72	Doha, Qatar	5 October 2019

== Qualification standard ==
First fourteen placed teams at the 2025 World Athletics Relays and the next two highest placed team on year top list.

== Schedule ==
The event schedule, in local time (UTC+9), is as follows:

Date	Time	Round
20 September	20:25	Heats
21 September	21:20	Final

== Results ==
=== Heats ===
The heats took place on 20 September. The first three teams in each heat ( Q ) and the next two fastest ( q ) qualified for the final.

==== Heat 1 ====
Place	Lane	Nation	Athletes	Time	Notes
1	5	Canada	Aaron Brown, Jerome Blake, Brendon Rodney, Andre De Grasse	37.85	Q, SB
2	8	United States	Christian Coleman, Ronnie Baker, Trayvon Bromell, T'Mars McCallum	37.98	Q
3	7	Germany	Deniz Almas, Marvin Schulte, Owen Ansah, Lucas Ansah-Peprah	38.12	Q, SB
4	4	France	Ryan Zeze, Jeff Erius, Theo Schaub, Aymeric Priam	38.34	q
5	9	Belgium	Kobe Vleminckx, Emiel Botterman, Antoine Snyders, Simon Verherstraeten	38.46	NR
6	2	Kenya	Boniface Mweresa, Steve Onyango Odhiambo, Meshack Kitsubuli Babu, Mark Odhiambo	38.56	
7	6	Poland	Oliwer Wdowik, Łukasz Żak, Adrian Brzeziński, Dominik Kopeć	38.59	
—	3	Jamaica	Ackeem Blake, Oblique Seville, Ryiem Forde, Kishane Thompson	DNF	

==== Heat 2 ====
Place	Lane	Nation	Athletes	Time	Notes
1	2	Ghana	Ibrahim Fuseini, Benjamin Azamati, Joseph Amoah, Abdul-Rasheed Saminu	37.79	Q, NR
2	3	Netherlands	Nsikak Ekpo, Taymir Burnet, Xavi Mo-Ajok, Elvis Afrifa	37.95	Q
3	8	Japan	Yuki Koike, Hiroki Yanagita, Yoshihide Kiryu, Towa Uzawa	38.07	Q
4	9	Australia	Connor Bond, Joshua Azzopardi, Calab Law, Rohan Browning	38.21	q
5	4	China	Deng Zhijian, He Jinxian, Shi Junhao, Xie Zhenye	38.38	
6	5	Italy	Fausto Desalu, Marcell Jacobs, Lorenzo Patta, Matteo Melluzzo	38.52	
—	7	Great Britain & N.I.	Jeremiah Azu, Louie Hinchliffe, Jona Efoloko, Eugene Amo-Dadzie	DNF	
—	6	South Africa	Shaun Maswanganyi, Sinesipho Dambile, Bradley Nkoana, Akani Simbine	DNF	

==== Heat 3 (Re-run) ====
Place	Lane	Nation	Athletes	Time	Notes
1	6	South Africa	Shaun Maswanganyi, Sinesipho Dambile, Bradley Nkoana, Akani Simbine	38.64	

=== Final ===
Place	Lane	Nation	Athletes	Time	Notes
1st place, gold medalist(s)	7	United States	Christian Coleman, Kenneth Bednarek, Courtney Lindsey, Noah Lyles	37.29	WL
2nd place, silver medalist(s)	5	Canada	Aaron Brown, Jerome Blake, Brendon Rodney, Andre De Grasse	37.55	SB
3rd place, bronze medalist(s)	8	Netherlands	Nsikak Ekpo, Taymir Burnet, Xavi Mo-Ajok, Elvis Afrifa	37.81	NR
4	6	Ghana	Ibrahim Fuseini, Benjamin Azamati, Joseph Amoah, Abdul-Rasheed Saminu	37.93	
5	9	Germany	Julian Wagner, Marvin Schulte, Owen Ansah, Lucas Ansah-Peprah	38.29	
6	4	Japan	Yuki Koike, Hiroki Yanagita, Yoshihide Kiryu, Towa Uzawa	38.35	
7	2	France	Ryan Zeze, Jeff Erius, Lenny Chanteur, Aymeric Priam	38.58	
—	3	Australia	Connor Bond, Jacob Despard, Calab Law, Rohan Browning	DNF	
