= List of Belgian records in athletics =

The following are the national records in athletics in Belgium maintained by its Athletics Federation: Ligue royale belge d'athlétisme/Koninklijke Belgische Atletiekbond (LRBA/KBAB).

== Outdoor ==
Key to tables: Awaiting ratification Record not kept by LRBA/KBAB Not ratified or later rescinded by LRBA/KBAB

=== Men ===
Event	Record	Athlete	Date	Meet	Place	Ref.
100 m	10.02 (+1.2 m/s)	Ronald Desruelles	11 May 1985		Naimette-Xhovémont, Belgium	
150 m (bend)	15.17 (±0.0 m/s)	Simon Verherstraeten	16 June 2026	Golden Spike Ostrava	Ostrava, Czech Republic	
200 m	20.13 (+0.4 m/s)	Simon Verherstraeten	14 July 2024	Resisprint International	La Chaux-de-Fonds, Switzerland	
200 m straight	20.98 (−0.6 m/s)	Jonathan Borlée	4 September 2016	Urban Memorial Van Damme	Brussels, Belgium	
300 m	31.87	Jonathan Borlée	5 July 2012	Meeting de la Province de Liège	Naimette-Xhovémont, Belgium	
400 m	44.15	Alexander Doom	10 June 2024	European Championships	Rome, Italy	
600 m	1:13.53	Eliott Crestan	15 July 2026	Meeting International d'Athlétisme de la Province de Liège	Naimette-Xhovémont, Belgium	
800 m	1:42.43	Eliott Crestan	7 July 2024	Meeting de Paris	Paris, France	
1000 m	2:15.29	Pieter Sisk	9 August 2025	IFAM Meeting	Oordegem, Belgium	
1500 m	3:30.99	Ruben Verheyden	20 June 2025	Meeting de Paris	Paris, France	
Mile	3:50.67 (Note: outdoor best; indoor mark ratified as absolute record)	Ruben Verheyden	12 June 2025	Bislett Games	Oslo, Norway	
Mile (road)	3:52.77	Ruben Querinjean (Note: Luxembourgish by World Athletics source; probably dual citizenship)	19 September 2026	World Road Running Championships	Copenhagen, Denmark	
2000 m	4:52.37	Ruben Verheyden	8 September 2023	Memorial van Damme	Brussels, Belgium	
3000 m	7:26.62	Mohammed Mourhit	18 August 2000	Herculis	Fontvieille, Monaco	
Two miles	8:14.88	Mohammed Mourhit	31 May 1997	Fanny Blankers-Koen Games	Hengelo, Netherlands	
5000 m	12:49.71	Mohammed Mourhit	25 August 2000	Memorial Van Damme	Brussels, Belgium	
5 km (road)	13:19	Robin Hendrix	31 December 2020	BOclassic	Bolzano, Italy	
10,000 m	26:52.30	Mohammed Mourhit	3 September 1999	Memorial Van Damme	Brussels, Belgium	
10 km (road)	27:10	Isaac Kimeli	12 January 2025	10K Valencia Ibercaja	Valencia, Spain	
15 km (road)	43:04	Peter Daenens	9 February 1985		Tampa, United States	
20,000 m (track)	57:44.4+ h	Gaston Roelants	20 September 1972		Brussels, Belgium	
20,000 m (track)	56:20.02+	Bashir Abdi	4 September 2020	Memorial Van Damme	Brussels, Belgium	
20 km (road)	58:29	Mohammed Mourhit	20 October 1996		Paris, France	
One hour	21322 m	Bashir Abdi	4 September 2020	Memorial Van Damme	Brussels, Belgium	
Half marathon	59:51	Bashir Abdi	12 March 2023		Ghent, Belgium	
25,000 m (track)	1:17:35+	Marc De Blander	2 September 1981		Denderleeuw, Belgium	
25 km (road)	1:13:25+	Bashir Abdi	1 March 2020	Tokyo Marathon	Tokyo, Japan	
30,000 m (track)	1:33:22	Marc De Blander	2 September 1981		Denderleeuw, Belgium	
30 km (road)	1:27:53+	Bashir Abdi	24 October 2021	Rotterdam Marathon	Rotterdam, Netherlands	
Marathon	2:03:36	Bashir Abdi	24 October 2021	Rotterdam Marathon	Rotterdam, Netherlands	
100 km (road)	6:15:30	Jean-Paul Praet	23 June 1989	Nacht van Vlaanderen	Torhout, Belgium	
48 hours (road)	485.099 km	Matthieu Bonne	30 May–1 June 2025	UltraPark Weekend 48 Hour	Pabianice, Poland	
6 days (road)	1045.519 km	Matthieu Bonne	5–11 September 2024	6 Day World Championships	Balatonfüred, Hungary	
110 m hurdles	13.10 (+0.8 m/s)	Michael Obasuyi	28 June 2026	Meeting de Paris	Paris, France	
200 m hurdles	23.02	Jonathan Nsenga	13 September 1997			
200 m hurdles (straight)	23.62	Damien Broothaerts	4 September 2016	Urban Memorial Van Damme	Brussels, Belgium	
400 m hurdles	48.66	Julien Watrin	2 September 2022	Memorial Van Damme	Brussels, Belgium	
2000 m steeplechase	5:22.24	William Van Dijck	8 August 1987	KBC Night of Athletics	Hechtel-Eksel, Belgium	
3000 m steeplechase	8:09.47	Ruben Querinjean (Note: started for Luxembourg; ratified because he has Belgian citizenship)	22 August 2025	Memorial Van Damme	Brussels, Belgium	
High jump	2.36 m	Eddy Annys	26 May 1985		Ghent, Belgium	
Pole vault	5.85 m	Ben Broeders	11 June 2022	Neujahrsspringen Meeting	Merzig, Germany	
Long jump	8.25 m (+0.2 m/s)	Erik Nys	6 July 1996	KBC Night of Athletics	Hechtel-Eksel, Belgium	
Triple jump	17.00 m (−0.8 m/s)	Michael Velter	14 May 2006		Vilvoorde, Belgium	
Shot put	19.34 m	Jos Schroeder	30 May 1976		Heizel, Belgium	
Discus throw	67.26 m	Philip Milanov	6 May 2016	Qatar Athletic Super Grand Prix	Doha, Qatar	
Hammer throw	71.76 m	Marnix Verhegghe	24 September 1989		Obourg, Belgium	
Javelin throw	87.35 m A	Timothy Herman	13 May 2023	Kip Keino Classic	Nairobi, Kenya	
Decathlon	8519 pts	Hans Van Alphen	26–27 May 2012	Hypo-Meeting	Götzis, Austria	
Decathlon	100m (wind) / Long jump (wind) / Shot put / High jump / 400m / 110m H (wind) / Discus / Pole vault / Javelin / 1500m; 10.96 (+1.0 m/s) / 7.62 m (+1.1 m/s) / 15.23 m / 2.06 m / 49.54 / 14.55 (+0.4 m/s) / 45.45 m / 4.96 m / 64.15 m / 4:20.87					
10,000 m walk (track)	40:04.8 h	Jos Martens	26 March 1988		Sittard, Netherlands	
20,000 m walk (track)	1:25:32.4	Dirk Nicque	6 April 1997		Tilburg, Netherlands	
20 km walk (road)	1:23:13	Jos Martens	10 April 1988		Goirle, Netherlands	
30,000 m walk (track)	2:12:00.7+ h	Godfried Dejonckheere	14 October 1989		Heule, Belgium	
50,000 m walk (track)	4:05:54.8	Dirk Nicque	14 June 1998		Rotterdam, Netherlands	
50 km walk (road)	3:47:34	Godfried De Jonckheere	10 September 1989		Arras, France	
Two hours walk (track)	27277 m	Godfried Dejonckheere	14 October 1989		Heule, Belgium	
4 × 100 m relay	38.46	Belgium; Kobe Vleminckx; Emiel Botterman; Antoine Snyders; Simon Verherstraeten	20 September 2025	World Championships	Tokyo, Japan	
4 × 200 m relay	1:24.15	Royal Excelsior SC; Miguel Morel Corredera; Arnaud Ghislain; Antoine Gillet; Damien Broothaerts	8 May 2011	Grand Prix Mingels	Brussels, Belgium	
4 × 400 m relay	2:57.75	Belgium; Jonathan Sacoor; Dylan Borlée; Kevin Borlée; Florent Mabille	10 August 2024	Olympic Games	Paris, France	
4 × 800 m relay	7:15.8 h	Belgium; André Ballieux; Alfred Langenus; Emile Leva; Roger Moens	8 August 1956		Bosvoorde, Belgium	
4 × 1500 m relay	15:06.8 h	Belgium; Marc Corstjens; Ivo Claes; Gino Van Geyte; Christophe Impens	5 June 1992		Sheffield, United Kingdom	
Ekiden relay	2:02:37	Belgium; Thomas De Bock / 5 km Simon Debognies / 10 km Tim Van de Velde / 5 km Isaac Kimeli / 10 km Dorian Boulvin / 5 km Dieter Kersten / 7.195 km	11 November 2022		Tongeren, Belgium	

=== Women ===
Event	Record	Athlete	Date	Meet	Place	Ref.
100 m	11.04 (+2.0 m/s)	Kim Gevaert	9 July 2006	Belgian Championships	Brussels, Belgium	
200 m	22.20 (+2.0 m/s)	Kim Gevaert	9 July 2006	Belgian Championships	Brussels, Belgium	
200 m straight	24.20 (+0.6 m/s)	Olivia Borlée	4 September 2016	Urban Memorial Van Damme	Brussels, Belgium	
300 m	36.47	Cynthia Bolingo	6 August 2022	Meeting for Mon	Kessel-Lo, Belgium	
400 m	49.96	Cynthia Bolingo	21 August 2023	World Championships	Budapest, Hungary	
600 m	1:25.91	Sandra Stals	27 August 2002		Naimette-Xhovemont, Belgium	
800 m	1:58.31	Sandra Stals	1 August 1998	KBC Night of Athletics	Hechtel-Eksel, Belgium	
1000 m	2:35.98	Elise Vanderelst	3 July 2021	KBC Night of Athletics	Heusden-Zolder, Belgium	
1500 m	4:01.26	Elise Vanderelst	14 September 2024	Memorial Van Damme	Brussels, Belgium	
Mile	4:28.11	Almensh Belete	18 August 2012	Flanders Cup	Kessel-Lo, Belgium	
Mile (road)	4:39.43 Wo	Mariska Parewyck	19 September 2026	World Road Running Championships	Copenhagen, Denmark	
2000 m	5:42.15	Veerle Dejaeghere	14 July 2001	KBC Night of Athletics	Heusden-Zolder, Belgium	
3000 m	8:36.14	Jana Van Lent	10 July 2026	Herculis	Fontvieille, Monaco	
Two miles	9:49.93	Veerle Dejaeghere	14 September 2007	Memorial Van Damme	Brussels, Belgium	
5000 m	14:37.47	Jana Van Lent	22 August 2025	Memorial Van Damme	Brussels, Belgium	
5 km (road)	14:42+ Mx	Jana Van Lent	4 January 2026	Prom'Classic	Nice, France	
10,000 m	30:51.18	Jana Van Lent	6 June 2026	Belgian Championships	Louvain-la-Neuve, Belgium	
10 km (road)	30:10 Mx	Jana Van Lent	4 January 2026	Prom'Classic	Nice, France	
15 km (road)	47:58 Wo	Chloé Herbiet	7 March 2026	Gate River Run 15K	Jacksonville, United States	
One hour	17315 m	Nina Lauwaert	4 September 2020	Memorial Van Damme	Brussels, Belgium	
20 km (road)	1:05:18 + Wo	Chloé Herbiet	20 September 2026	World Road Running Championships	Copenhagen, Denmark	
Half marathon	1:07:32	Chloé Herbiet	29 March 2026	Berlin Half Marathon	Berlin, Germany	
Half marathon	1:08:44 Wo	Chloé Herbiet	20 September 2026	World Road Running Championships	Copenhagen, Denmark	
25 km (road)	1:23:49+	Chloé Herbiet	7 December 2025	Valencia Marathon	Valencia, Spain	
30 km (road)	1:40:31+	Chloé Herbiet	7 December 2025	Valencia Marathon	Valencia, Spain	
Marathon	2:20:38	Chloé Herbiet	7 December 2025	Valencia Marathon	Valencia, Spain	
100 m hurdles	12.71 (+1.4 m/s)	Anne Zagré	18 July 2015	KBC Night of Athletics	Heusden-Zolder, Belgium	
200 m hurdles (straight)	26.61	Axelle Dauwens	4 September 2016	Urban Memorial Van Damme	Brussels, Belgium	
300 m hurdles	38.66	Paulien Couckuyt	18 July 2026	KBC Night of Athletics	Heusden-Zolder, Belgium	
400 m hurdles	53.20	Paulien Couckuyt	4 September 2026	Memorial Van Damme	Brussels, Belgium	
2000 m steeplechase	6:05.53	Eline Dalemans	27 July 2025	ISTAF Berlin	Berlin, Germany	
3000 m steeplechase	9:28.47	Veerle Dejaeghere	2 June 2007		Neerpelt, Belgium	
High jump	2.05 m	Tia Hellebaut	23 August 2008	Olympic Games	Beijing, China	
Pole vault	4.73 m	Elien Vekemans	13 August 2025 (Note: by World Athletics source; 13 July 2025 by VAL source, a typo)	29th International Pole Vault Meet	Jockgrim, Germany	
Long jump	6.86 m (+0.9 m/s)	Nafissatou Thiam	18 August 2019	Diamond League	Birmingham, United Kingdom	
Triple jump	14.55 m (+2.0 m/s)	Svetlana Bolshakova	31 July 2010	European Championships	Barcelona, Spain	
Shot put	17.29 m	Jolien Boumkwo	25 May 2024	Hallesche Werfertage	Halle, Germany	
Discus throw	61.40 m	Marie-Paule Geldhof	30 April 1994		Eeklo, Belgium	
Hammer throw	69.91 m	Vanessa Sterckendries	23 August 2020		Leverkusen, Germany	
Javelin throw	59.32 m (Note: record set during heptathlon competition)	Nafissatou Thiam	28 May 2017	Hypo Meeting	Götzis, Austria	
Heptathlon	7013 pts	Nafissatou Thiam	27–28 May 2017	Hypo Meeting	Götzis, Austria	
Heptathlon	100m H (wind) / High jump / Shot put / 200m (wind) / Long jump (wind) / Javelin / 800m; 13.37 (−0.7 m/s) / 1.98 m / 14.51 m / 24.40 (−1.6 m/s) / 6.56 m (+0.8 m/s) / 59.32 m / 2:15.24					
Decathlon	6577 pts	Cassandre Evans	28–29 September 2019		Schaerbeek, Belgium	
Decathlon	100m (wind) / Long jump (wind) / Shot put / High jump / 400m / 110m H (wind) / Discus / Pole vault / Javelin / 1500m; 12.62 (−1.5 m/s) / 5.49 m (−2.3 m/s) / 11.92 m / 1.57 m / 1:03.58 / 15.18 (−1.4 m/s) / 35.71 m / 3.00 m / 40.62 m / 5:56.58					
5000 m walk (track)	23:18.2 h	Sabine Desmet	28 May 1987		Villeneuve-d'Ascq, France	
10,000 m walk (track)	51:18.9	Christa Ceulemans	3 June 1992		Weert, Netherlands	
10 km walk (road)	49:55	Sabine Desmet	2 May 1987		New York City, United States	
20 km walk (road)	1:50:37	Frieda de Wolf	24 June 1989		Bruges, Belgium	
4 × 100 m relay	42.54	Belgium; Olivia Borlée; Hanna Mariën; Élodie Ouédraogo; Kim Gevaert	22 August 2008	Olympic Games	Beijing, China	
4 × 200 m relay	1:35.38	Racing Club Gent; Justine Goossens; Cloe Van Der Meulen; Kiné Gaye; Imke Vervaet	5 September 2021	Belgian Championships Relays	Jambes, Belgium	
4 × 400 m relay	3:22.12	Belgium; Cynthia Bolingo; Hanne Claes; Camille Laus; Helena Ponette	20 August 2022	European Championships	Munich, Germany	
4 × 800 m relay	8:36.4 h	Hermes Club Oostende; Griet Vanmassenhove; Ingrid Dalagrange; Linda Milo; Regine Berg	26 July 1986		Waregem, Belgium	
Ekiden relay	2:31:13	Daring Club Leuven Atletiek; Marieken Verhaeghe / 5 km Kim Geypen / 10 km Domi Lambrechts / 5 km Veerle Van Linden / 10 km Annelore Desaedeleer / 5 km Sigrid Vanden Bempt / 7.195 km	13 October 2012	Acerta Brussels Ekiden	Brussels, Belgium	

=== Mixed ===
Event	Record	Athlete	Date	Meet	Place	Ref.
4 × 100 m relay	41.16	Belgium; Simon Verherstraeten; Rani Rosius; Kobe Vleminckx; Delphine Nkansa	22 August 2025	Memorial Van Damme	Brussels, Belgium	
4 × 400 m relay	3:09.36 (Note: by official result source; 3:09.39 by VAL source, a typo)	Belgium; Alexander Doom; Helena Ponette; Jonathan Sacoor; Naomi Van den Broeck	3 August 2024	Olympic Games	Paris, France	

== Indoor ==
=== Men ===
Event	Record	Athlete	Date	Meet	Place	Ref.
60 m	6.52	Simon Verherstraeten	1 March 2026	Belgian Championships	Louvain-La-Neuve, Belgium	
100 m	10.35	Patrick Stevens	12 February 1996		Tampere, Finland	
200 m	20.66	Patrick Stevens	19 February 1995	Meeting Pas de Calais	Liévin, France	
200 m	20.66	Erik Wijmeersch	12 February 1997	Indoor Flanders Meeting	Ghent, Belgium	
200 m	20.66	Patrick Stevens	25 February 2000	European Championships	Ghent, Belgium	
300 m	32.72	Kevin Borlée	10 February 2013	Indoor Flanders Meeting	Ghent, Belgium	
400 m	45.25	Alexander Doom	2 March 2024	World Championships	Glasgow, United Kingdom	
500 m	1:00.76	Jonathan Borlée	14 February 2015	Millrose Games	New York City, United States	
600 m	1:14.92	Eliott Crestan	25 January 2025	LBFA Allianz Championships	Louvain-la-Neuve, Belgium	
800 m	1:43.83	Eliott Crestan	3 February 2026	Czech Indoor Gala	Ostrava, Czech Republic	
1000 m	2:17.17	Pieter Sisk	3 February 2024 (Note: by World Athletics source; 3 February 2004 by LRBA/KBAB source, a typo)	IFAM Indoor	Ghent, Belgium	
1500 m	3:33.32+	Pieter Sisk	31 January 2026	BU John Thomas Terrier Classic	Boston, United States	
Mile	3:50.31	Pieter Sisk	31 January 2026	BU John Thomas Terrier Classic	Boston, United States	
2000 m	4:52.41	Pieter Sisk	24 January 2026	New Balance Indoor Grand Prix	Boston, United States	
3000 m	7:38.94	Mohammed Mourhit	11 March 2001	World Championships	Lisbon, Portugal	
Two miles	8:13.2 h	Emiel Puttemans	18 February 1973		Berlin, Germany	
5000 m	13:03.46	John Heymans	26 January 2024	BU John Thomas Terrier Classic	Boston, United States	
10,000 m	28:12.4 h	Emiel Puttemans	22 February 1975		Pantin, France	
50 m hurdles	6.56+	Jonathan N'Senga	13 February 2000	Meeting Pas de Calais	Liévin, France	
60 m hurdles	7.50	Elie Bacari	18 January 2026	CMCM Meeting	Kirchberg, Luxembourg	
110 m hurdles	13.79	Jonathan N'Senga	12 February 1996		Tampere, Finland	
400 m hurdles	53.54	Jori Stroobants	27 January 2018	Meeting Elite en salle de l'Eure	Val-de-Reuil, France	
2000 m steeplechase	5:43.90	Bert Misplon	13 February 2011	Indoor Flanders Meeting	Ghent, Belgium	
High jump	2.31 m	Eddy Annys	17 January 1986		Simmerath, Germany	
High jump	2.31 m	Eddy Annys	25 February 1986		Solna, Sweden	
Pole vault	5.82 m	Ben Broeders	8 February 2023	Copernicus Cup	Toruń, Poland	
Long jump	8.08 m	Erik Nys	12 February 1995	Indoor Flanders Meeting	Ghent, Belgium	
Triple jump	16.90 m	Michael Velter	29 January 2005		Ghent, Belgium	
Shot put	18.92 m	Matthias Quintelier	26 February 2022	Belgian Championships	Louvain-la-Neuve, Belgium	
Discus throw	64.16 m	Philip Milanov	13 February 2016	ISTAF Indoor	Berlin, Germany	
Heptathlon	6259 pts	Thomas Van Der Plaetsen	7–8 March 2014	World Championships	Sopot, Poland	
Heptathlon	60m / Long jump / Shot put / High jump / 60m H / Pole vault / 1000m; 7.13 / 7.67 m / 14.32 m / 2.12 m / 8.16 / 5.20 m / 2:40.50					
Heptathlon	6259 pts	Jente Hauttekeete	7–8 March 2025	European Championships	Apeldoorn, Netherlands	
Heptathlon	60m / Long jump / Shot put / High jump / 60m H / Pole vault / 1000m; 6.93 / 7.30 m / 14.98 m / 2.07 m / 7.95 / 5.10 m / 2:39.82					
3000 m walk	12:08.9	Philippe Burton	18 January 1987		Liévin, France	
5000 m walk	18:54.67	Joseph Martens	6 March 1988	European Championships	Budapest, Hungary	
4 × 200 m relay	1:25.56	Racing Club Brussel (RCB); Dylan Borlée; Kevin Borlée; Jonathan Borlée; Raymond Bang Cuse	8 February 2016	IFAM Indoor	Ghent, Belgium	
4 × 400 m relay	3:02.51	Belgium; Dylan Borlée; Jonathan Borlée; Jonathan Sacoor; Kevin Borlée	4 March 2018	World Championships	Birmingham, United Kingdom	

=== Women ===
Event	Record	Athlete	Date	Meet	Place	Ref.
60 m	7.08	Rani Rosius	9 March 2025	European Championships	Apeldoorn, Netherlands	
200 m	23.26	Imke Vervaet	19 February 2023	Belgian Championships	Ghent, Belgium	
300 m	36.69	Cynthia Bolingo Mbongo	23 February 2019		Ghent, Belgium	
400 m	51.62	Cynthia Bolingo Mbongo	2 March 2019	European Championships	Glasgow, United Kingdom	
600 m	1:29.0 h	Regine Berg	27 February 1988		Vittel, France	
800 m	2:00.46	Sandra Stals	20 February 2000	Aviva Indoor Grand Prix	Birmingham, United Kingdom	
1000 m	2:39.68	Sandra Stals	26 February 2005	Meeting Pas de Calais	Liévin, France	
1500 m	4:05.71	Elise Vanderelst	9 February 2021	Meeting Hauts-de-France Pas-de-Calais	Liévin, France	
Mile	4:29.31	Elise Vanderelst	30 January 2024	Czech Indoor Gala	Ostrava, Czech Republic	
3000 m	8:47.98	Lisa Rooms	3 February 2024	Meeting Metz Moselle Athlélor	Metz, France	
5000 m	16:21.31	Veronique Collard	8 February 1998		Ghent, Belgium	
50 m hurdles	6.91+	Eline Berings	5 March 2010	Meeting Pas de Calais	Liévin, France	
60 m hurdles	7.92	Eline Berings	6 March 2009	European Championships	Turin, Italy	
High jump	2.05 m (Note: outdoor mark ratified as absolute record)	Tia Hellebaut	3 March 2007	European Championships	Birmingham, United Kingdom	
Pole vault	4.56 m	Elien Vekemans	24 January 2025	Perche Elite Tour	Rouen, France	
Long jump	6.79 m	Nafissatou Thiam	1 March 2020	French Championships	Liévin, France	
Triple jump	14.31 m	Svetlana Bolshakova	13 February 2011	Indoor Flanders Meeting	Ghent, Belgium	
Shot put	17.87 m	Jolien Boumkwo	19 February 2023	Belgian Championships	Ghent, Belgium	
Pentathlon	5055 pts	Nafissatou Thiam	3 March 2023	European Championships	Istanbul, Turkey	
Pentathlon	60m H / High jump / Shot put / Long jump / 800m; 8.23 / 1.92 m / 15.54 m / 6.59 m / 2:13.60					
3000 m walk	13:58.3 ht	Sabine Desmet	24 January 1987	Meeting Pas de Calais	Liévin, France	
4 × 200 m relay	1:37.48	Racing Club Gent; Imke Vervaet; Lauren Bauwens; Cloe Van Der Meulen; Justine Goossens	2 February 2020		Louvain-la-Neuve, Belgium	
4 × 400 m relay	3:28.05	Belgium; Naomi Van den Broeck; Helena Ponette; Camille Laus; Cynthia Bolingo	3 March 2024	World Championships	Glasgow, United Kingdom	

=== Mixed ===
Event	Record	Athlete	Date	Meet	Place	Ref.
4 × 400 m relay	3:15.60	Belgium; Jonathan Sacoor; Ilana Hanssens; Julien Watrin; Helena Ponette	21 March 2026	World Championships	Toruń, Poland	
