= 2026 European Athletics Championships – Men's 4 × 100 metres relay =

Men's 4 × 100 metres relay at the 2026 European Athletics Championships
- Venue: Alexander Stadium
- Location: Birmingham, United Kingdom
- Dates: 15 August 2026
- Nations: 16
- Winning time: 38.45

Medalists
gold medal	Jeremiah Azu; Louie Hinchliffe; Zharnel Hughes; Romell Glave	Great Britain
silver medal	Kevin Kranz; Marvin Schulte; Heiko Gussmann; Lucas Ansah-Peprah	Germany
bronze medal	Ibrahim Camara; Emiel Botterman; Antoine Snyders; Simon Verherstraeten	Belgium

The men's 4 × 100 metres relay at the 2026 European Athletics Championships took place over two rounds at the Alexander Stadium in Birmingham, United Kingdom, on 15 August 2026.

== Background ==
Records before the 2026 European Athletics Championships
Record	Athlete (nation)	Time	Location	Date
World record	Jamaica (Nesta Carter, Michael Frater, Yohan Blake, Usain Bolt)	36.84	London, United Kingdom	11 August 2012
European record	Great Britain (Adam Gemili, Zharnel Hughes, Richard Kilty, Nethaneel Mitchell-Blake)	37.36	Doha, Qatar	5 October 2019
Championship record	Great Britain (Jeremiah Azu, Zharnel Hughes, Jona Efoloko, Nethaneel Mitchell-Blake)	37.67	Munich, Germany	21 August 2022
World leading	United States (Ronnie Baker, Max Thomas, Lance Lang, Pjai Austin)	37.43	Gaborone, Botswana	3 May 2026
European leading	Germany (Kevin Kranz, Marvin Schulte, Owen Ansah, Lucas Ansah-Peprah)	37.67	Gaborone, Botswana	2 May 2026

== Qualification ==
For the men's 4 × 100 metres relay, the qualification period is from 1 January 2025 to 26 July 2026. The qualification procedure will be based on the aggregate of the two fastest times achieved by national teams in the qualification period. For being ranked, the results of relay races shall be valid only on condition that they are part of a competition staged in compliance with World Athletics Rules (and included into World Athletics Global Calendar) and that at least 2 international teams, representing at least 2 countries compete in the race. A total of 16 national teams can compete in the event. Host nation Great Britain has the right to be represented with one national team in the event. If they wish to participate and are not qualified as indicated above, the number of national teams to qualify will be reduced to 15.

Qualification standings per 31 July 2026
QP	Country	Athletes	Status	Accumulated times	Result 1	Result 2
1	Great Britain & N.I.		Allocated to Host Country			
2	Germany		Qualified by European Ranking	75.43	37.67	37.76
3	Netherlands		Qualified by European Ranking	75.68	37.81	37.87
4	Italy		Qualified by European Ranking	76.36	38.16	38.20
5	Belgium		Qualified by European Ranking	76.86	38.40	38.46
6	Poland		Qualified by European Ranking	77.02	38.43	38.59
7	Spain		Qualified by European Ranking	77.37	38.57	38.80
8	Ireland		Qualified by European Ranking	77.80	38.88	38.92
9	Switzerland		Qualified by European Ranking	77.83	38.88	38.95
10	Slovenia		Qualified by European Ranking	77.90	38.91	38.99
11	Greece		Qualified by European Ranking	77.94	38.91	39.03
12	Portugal		Qualified by European Ranking	78.02	38.99	39.03
13	Sweden		Qualified by European Ranking	78.03	38.96	39.07
14	Norway		Qualified by European Ranking	78.10	38.86	39.24
15	Turkey		Qualified by European Ranking	78.10	39.05	39.05
16	Finland		Qualified by European Ranking	78.11	39.05	39.06

== Schedule ==
Date	Time	Round
15 August 2026	13:00	Round 1
15 August 2026	21:33	Final

All times are local times (UTC+1)

== Results ==
=== Round 1 ===
Round 1 was held on 15 August 2026, at 13:00 in the afternoon. First 3 in each heat (Q) and the next 2 fastest (q) advanced to the final.

==== Heat 1 ====
Place	Lane	Nation	Athletes	Time	Notes
1	9	Great Britain & N.I.	Jeremiah Azu, Louie Hinchliffe, Zharnel Hughes, Romell Glave	38.29	Q
2	3	Netherlands	Daniljo Vriendwijk, Jozuah Revierre, Xavi Mo-Ajok, Elvis Afrifa	38.82	Q
3	2	Greece	Ioannis Voskopoulos, Nikolaos Panagiotopoulos, Sotirios Gkaragkanis, Vasileios Myrianthopoulos	39.17	Q, SB
4	6	Poland	Jakub Lempach, Patryk Krupa, Łukasz Żak, Dominik Kopeć	39.17	q
5	4	Turkey	Ertan Özkan, Oğuz Uyar, Batuhan Altıntaş, Emre Ergün	39.27	
6	7	Portugal	André Prazeres, Gabriel Maia, Delvis Santos, Gerson Baldé	39.49	
7	5	Norway	Per Tinius Fremstad-Waldron, Jørgen Homstad, Mathias Hove Johansen, Salum Ageze Kashafali	39.79	
—	8	Spain	Jorge Hernández, Abel Jordán, Andoni Calbano, Guillem Crespí	DNF	

==== Heat 2 ====
Place	Lane	Nation	Athletes	Time	Notes
1	5	Italy	Eric Marek, Eduardo Longobardi, Lorenzo Patta, Samuele Ceccarelli	38.50	Q
2	9	Germany	Kevin Kranz, Marvin Schulte, Heiko Gussmann, Lucas Ansah-Peprah	38.57	Q
3	4	Belgium	Amine Kasmi, Emiel Botterman, Antoine Snyders, Cédric Verschueren	38.84	Q
4	8	Ireland	Toluwabori Akinola, Sean Aigboboh, Marcus Lawler, Israel Olatunde	39.13	q, SB
5	6	Switzerland	Timothé Mumenthaler, Daryl Bachmann, Felix Svensson, Jason Joseph	39.18	SB
6	7	Slovenia	Staš Tin Lorbar, Filip Oiclj, Andrej Skočir, Anej Čurin Prapotnik	39.28	
7	2	Sweden	Filip Olsson, Zion Eriksson, Linus Pihl, Jean-Christian Zirignon	39.71	
—	3	Finland	Valtteri Louko, Riku Illukka, Oskari Lehtonen, Samuel Purola	DNF	

=== Final ===
The final was held on 15 August 2026, at 21:33 in the evening.

Place	Lane	Nation	Athletes	Time	Notes
1st place, gold medalist(s)	6	Great Britain & N.I.	Jeremiah Azu, Louie Hinchliffe, Zharnel Hughes, Romell Glave	38.45	
2nd place, silver medalist(s)	5	Germany	Kevin Kranz, Marvin Schulte, Heiko Gussmann, Lucas Ansah-Peprah	38.64	
3rd place, bronze medalist(s)	9	Belgium	Ibrahim Camara, Emiel Botterman, Antoine Snyders, Simon Verherstraeten	38.70	
4	7	Netherlands	Daniljo Vriendwijk, Jozuah Revierre, Xavi Mo-Ajok, Elvis Afrifa	38.98	
5	2	Poland	Jakub Lempach, Sebastian Libura, Łukasz Żak, Dominik Kopeć	39.18	
6	4	Greece	Ioannis Voskopoulos, Nikolaos Panagiotopoulos, Sotirios Gkaragkanis, Vasileios Myrianthopoulos	39.21	
7	3	Ireland	Toluwabori Akinola, Sean Aigboboh, Marcus Lawler, Israel Olatunde	40.26	
—	8	Italy	Eric Marek, Eseosa Fostine Desalu, Lorenzo Patta, Samuele Ceccarelli	DQ	TR24.5[B]
