= Bori Akinola =

Irish sprinter

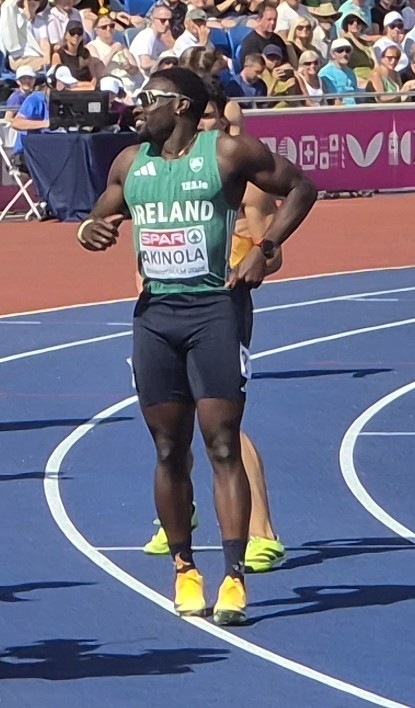
- Akinola at the 2026 European Championships

Personal information
- Full name: Toluwabori Akinola
- Nationality: Irish
- Born: 6 August 2001 (age 25)
- Height: 5 ft 0 in (152 cm)

Sport
- Sport: Athletics
- Event: Sprint
- Club: UCD AC
- Coached by: Adam McMullen

Achievements and titles
- Personal bests: 60m: 6.54 (2026) NR; 100m: 10.19 (2026); 200m: 21.42 (2025)

Toluwabori Akinola (born 6 August 2001) is an Irish sprinter. In 2025, he became Irish national champion over 60 metres and 100 metres and in 2026 set a new Irish national record in the 60m and retained his national title.

In September 2017, he emigrated to Ireland from Lagos, Nigeria with his mother, older brother and younger sister. He attended Community College in Balbriggan.

== Biography ==
Akinola was a relative late-starter to athletics, and was 17 years-old when he went to his first training session in 2018 in Santry with Fingallians Athletics Club.

Competing in July 2022 at the National under-23 Championships in Tullamore, he finished second in the 100 metres in 10.30. In 2023, he won a silver medal at the Irish Athletics Championships in the 100 metres, both behind Israel Olatunde. He was second behind Olatunde again at the 2024 Irish Championships. The pair were teammates in the 4 × 100 m relay at the 2024 European Athletics Championships, Akinola's first major championship.

In January 2025, he lowered his 60 metres personal best to 6.65 seconds. He won the 60 metres title at the Irish Indoor Athletics Championship at Abbotstown on 23 February 2025, running 6.61 seconds. The time put him joint-second on the Irish all-time list alongside Paul Hession, behind only the national record of 6.57 by Israel Olatunde, who finished third in the race. The first national title came despite the fact he had been nursing a hamstring injury in the lead-up to the race. He qualified for the Irish team for the 2025 European Athletics Indoor Championships in Apeldoorn. At the Championships, he ran 6.66 seconds to reach the semi-finals of the 60 metres race.

In June 2025, he ran the fastest all-conditions 100m time by an Irishman with 10.10 seconds (+2.9 m/s). On 21 June 2025, alongside Michael Farrelly, Marcus Lawler and Israel Olatunde, he set a new Irish 4 x 100 metres relay record, running a time of 38.92 seconds at a World Continental Tour Meeting in Switzerland, the record was broken the following week at the 2025 European Athletics Team Championships in Maribor, although he was not a member of the team due to picking up a niggle running in the 100 metres earlier that day, and was replaced with Sean Aigboboh. He won the 100 m at the 2025 Irish Athletics Championships ahead of Aigbobah. He set a new personal best of 10.20 seconds for the 100 m on 17 August 2025 in Stratford.

Akinola went unbeaten over 60 metres in January 2026. Competing in France on 24 January, he won the 60 m at the Meeting Indoor de Lyon, a World Athletics Indoor Tour Bronze meeting, in 6.65 seconds. The following week, he won at the EAP Glasgow in 6.59 seconds after he and Hungarian Dominik Illovszky were both credited with the same time. A few days later, he ran a new national record of 6.54 in Belgrade. On 1 March, Akinola retained his 60 m title at the Irish Indoor Athletics Championships, finishing in 6.60 seconds.

Selected for the 60 metres at the 2026 World Athletics Indoor Championships in Toruń, Poland, in March 2026, he reached the semi-finals with a run of 6.59 seconds. In May, he lowered his best for the 100 metres in Stratford to 10.19 seconds. In June, he won over 100 metres at the Josef Odložil Memorial in Prague. Defending his 100 metres title at the Irish Championships on 26 July, he placed second overall behind Benjamin Richardson who won in a new championship record time. Competing at the 2026 European Athletics Championships in Birmingham, England in August 2026, he was a semi-finalist in the 100 metres. He also ran in the men's 4 x 100 metres relay at the championships.

== Personal life ==
He studied computer science at University College Dublin, and later worked as an iOS engineer.
