= T'Mars McCallum =

American sprinter (born 2004)

Personal information
- Born: May 20, 2004 (age 22) Myrtle Beach, South Carolina, U.S.
- Height: 5 ft 8 in (173 cm)

Sport
- Country: United States
- Sport: Track and field
- Events: Sprints; Relays

Achievements and titles
- Personal bests: 60m: 6.59 (2025); 100m: 9.83 (2025); 200m: 19.73 (2025)
Medal record
Men's athletics
Representing the United States
World Championships
Gold medal – first place	2025 Tokyo	4 × 100 m relay

T'Mars McCallum (born May 20, 2004) is an American sprinter. He won bronze at the 2025 USA Outdoor Track and Field Championships in the 100 metres.

== Early life ==
From South Carolina, he attended Carolina Forest High School. As a youngster he was a member of the Myrtle Beach Track & Field Club. As well as excelling as a sprinter, he won state championships in the long jump, high jump and triple jump. He was recruited to North Carolina A&T by head coach Duane Ross, but followed Ross when he joined the University of Tennessee in 2022.

== Career ==
He ran wind-legal time for the 100 meters of 10.13 at the South Carolina state championships in May 2022. He won the 100 metres at the New Balance Nationals at Franklin Field in Philadelphia on 19 June 2022, in a wind-assisted 10.17 seconds.

He ran 10.03 seconds for the 100 metres at the Jamaica Athletics Invitational in May 2024. He qualified to compete at the US Olympic Trials in June 2024 in both the 100 metres and 200 metres, but missed the event through injury.

Competing at the NCAA Track & Field Championships East regional championships in Jacksonville, Florida, in May 2025, he ran a personal best 19.83 seconds for the 200 metres for an early world-lead in the discipline. He subsequently ran 10.03 seconds for the 100 metres to qualify for the final at the 2025 NCAA Outdoor Championships. On the same day, he ran 20.03 seconds to win his heat in the 200 metres. He placed fifth in the final of the 200 metres and eighth in the final of the 100 metres.

On 12 July 2025, he ran a wind-assisted 9.87 seconds (+2.1) in the 100 metres, and a world-leading 19.73 (+1.8) in the 200 metres Ed Murphey Track Classic, a World Athletics Continental Tour Silver event, in Memphis, Tennessee, regaining the world-lead from Letsile Tebogo who had run 19.76 seconds the weekend before.

He ran 10.01 seconds (-0.7 m/s) to win his preliminary heat of the 100 metres at the 2025 USA Outdoor Track and Field Championships, before 9.99 seconds to win his semi-final the following day. In the final, he lowered his personal best again to 9.83 seconds as he ran to a third place finish behind Kenny Bednarek and Courtney Lindsey. At the same championship, he reached the final of the 200 metres, placing eighth overall.

In September 2025, he competed in the 100 metres at the 2025 World Championships in Tokyo, Japan. He also ran in the men's 4 x 100 metres relay at the championships, as part of the gold medal winning American team.
