= Romell Glave =

British athlete (born 1999)

Personal information
- Nationality: British
- Born: 11 November 1999 (age 26) Manchester, Jamaica

Sport
- Sport: Athletics
- Event: Sprint
- Club: Croydon Harriers

Achievements and titles
- Personal bests: 60 m: 6.51 (Stockholm, 2026); 100 m: 9.97 (London, 2026); 200 m: 20.95 (Bedford, 2017)
Medal record
Men's athletics
Representing Great Britain
World Ultimate Championship
| Third place | 2026 Budapest | Mixed 4 × 100 m relay |
European Championships
| Gold medal – first place | 2026 Birmingham | 100 m |
| Gold medal – first place | 2026 Birmingham | 4 × 100 m relay |
| Bronze medal – third place | 2024 Rome | 100 m |

Romell Glave (born 11 November 1999) is a British sprinter. He is the reigning European champion in the 100 metres having won the title at the 2026 European Athletics Championships. He was also part of the gold medal-winning 4 × 100 metres relay team at the championships. He previously won the bronze medal in the 100 metres at the 2024 European Championships.

Born in Manchester, Jamaica, and brought up there, he moved to the UK in 2015. The following year, Glave joined the Croydon Harriers and became English Schools Champion over 200 metres. By 2017 he had become the world's fastest 17-year-old sprinter, running a 100 metres best of 10.21 seconds. Having overcome numerous injury problems in the subsequent years, he went on to represent Great Britain at multiple major championships, including the 2025 World Athletics Championships. He became the British champion in the 100 metres and officially broke the 10-second barrier for the first time on 20 June 2026.

== Early life ==
Brought up in Manchester, Jamaica, he was a keen footballer and cricketer as well as a sprinter in his youth. He has said he was inspired to prioritise sprinting by watching Usain Bolt in 2008. He arrived in the UK in 2015 to live in South Norwood within the London Borough of Croydon. He began at the Croydon Harriers athletic club in January 2016. That year, he won under-17 gold in the 200 m at the English Schools Championship before winning the 100 m and 200 m at the South of England Championships.

== Career ==
=== Early career: World’s fastest 17-year-old, but injuries ===
In 2017 he was officially the world's fastest 17-year-old sprinter, running a 100 metres best of 10.21 seconds. He also ran 6.77 for 60 metres, which placed him at the top of the under-20 UK rankings. In 2017, he won the 100 metres and 200 metres at the U20 England Championships. He had a long injury lay-off, returning to run a 10.61 100 m in August 2019. He also suffered a fractured back, which hampered his progress.

In August 2023, he ran a personal best 10.04, as well as 10.06 in the same night, over 100 metres in London. In September 2023, he ran a new personal best time of 10.02 seconds for the 100 m in London.

=== 2024: European Championships medal ===
In April 2024, he was selected as part of the British team for the 2024 World Athletics Relays in Nassau, Bahamas. In May 2024, he was selected to run the 100 metres and 4 × 100 m relay for Britain at the 2024 European Athletics Championships in Rome. He qualified for the final of the 100 metres and placed third overall in 10.06 seconds to win his first championship medal.

=== 2025: World Championships debut ===
He ran personal best time of 6.56 seconds over 60 metres at the Czech Indoor Gala in Ostrava on 4 February 2025. He was selected for the British team for the 2025 European Athletics Indoor Championships in Apeldoorn, however he later had to pull out with injury. He was named in the British team for the 2025 World Athletics Relays in Guangzhou. He ran in the men's 4 × 100 metres relay, alongside Nethaneel Mitchell-Blake, Jona Efoloko and Eugene Amo-Dadzie as the British quartet won their heat to qualify for the final and secure a place for Britain at the 2025 World Championships. He was selected for the 4 × 100 metres relay at the 2025 European Athletics Team Championships in Madrid in June 2025, helping the British men's 4 × 100 metres team to a third-place finish. In September 2025, he was a semi-finalist in the 100 metres at the 2025 World Championships in Tokyo, Japan, equaling his personal best of 10.00 seconds.

=== 2026: British and European champion ===
Glave opened his 2026 indoor season with a win over reigning world indoor champion Jeremiah Azu, and Olympic 100 metres silver medalist Kishane Thompson at the BAUHAUS-Galan Indoor, a World Athletics Winkle Indoor Tour Silver meeting, in Stockholm, winning in a personal best 6.51 seconds. Glave placed second in the final of the 60 metres at the 2026 British Indoor Athletics Championships in Birmingham on 14 February 2026, finishing behind Jeremiah Azu and ahead of Jody Smith, running 6.62 seconds in the final.

Glave was named in the British squad for the 4 × 100 metres relay at the 2026 World Athletics Relays in Gaborone, Botswana, anchoring the British men to a qualification spot for the final on the opening day. On 20 May, Glave ran a wind-aided 9.88 seconds (+2.7) for the 100 m at the Savona International Meeting in Italy before winning over 100 m at the Paavo Nurmi Games in Finland on 3 June. On 20 June, Glave broke the ten-second barrier for the 100 metres with a wind-legal 9.98 seconds to win the final at the 2026 UK Athletics Championships. Competing at the 2026 London Athletics Meet on 18 July, Glave ran a new 100 metres personal best of 9.97 seconds. At the 2026 Commonwealth Games he ran for England in the men's 4 × 100 m relay.

On 11 August, Glave won the 100 metres title at the 2026 European Athletics Championships in Birmingham, winning the gold medal with a run of 10.09 seconds ahead of Jeremiah Azu as part of a British one-two finish, with German Owen Ansah in third place. On 15 August, he ran the anchor-leg alongside Azu, Zharnel Hughes, and Louie Hinchliffe as Britain won the gold medal in the men's 4 × 100 metres relay at the championships. On 11 September, he was part of the Great Britain mixed 4 × 100 metres relay team which placed third at the inaugural World Ultimate Championship in Budapest. The following weekend, he equalled his personal best with 9.97 seconds at the Janusz Kusocinski Memorial in Silesia.

== Personal life ==
He studied a BTEC Extended Diploma in sports.
