= Israel Olatunde =

Irish sprinter

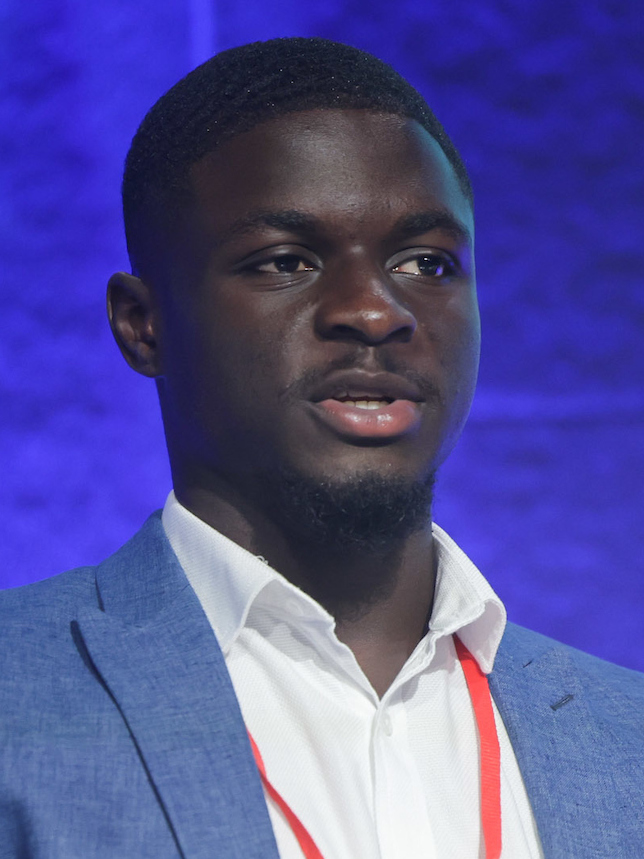
- Olatunde in 2022

Personal information
- Born: 29 May 2002 (age 24) Drogheda, Ireland
- Education: University College Dublin

Sport
- Country: Ireland
- Sport: Track and field
- Event: Sprints
- Club: Tallaght AC
- Coached by: Daniel Kilgallon (since 2019); Gerry McArdle (youth)

Achievements and titles
- Personal bests: 100 m: 10.08 NR (2025); 200 m: 21.49 (2021); Indoors; 60 m: 6.57 NR (2023); 200 m: 22.39 (2019)

Israel Olatunde (born 29 May 2002) is an Irish professional track and field athlete specializing in the sprints. He competed at the 2022 World Athletics Indoor Championships, and reached the final of the 100 metres at the 2022 European Athletics Championships, the first Irishman ever to do so, and where he finished sixth in an Irish record time. He later broke the national record in the 60 metres in 2023.

== Early years ==
Olatunde's parents, Elizabeth and Isaac, immigrated to Ireland from Nigeria in 1999 with their oldest son Gabriel. Israel was born in Drogheda and raised in Dundalk along with his older sister Sharon, though he made three trips to his parents' homeland during his upbringing. He played association football in his youth, where he "always knew [he] was faster than the other kids". He also tried Gaelic games and basketball. He gravitated towards the sport of athletics, though, because he "always copied whatever [his] sister did."

Olatunde took up competitive sprinting under coach Gerry McArdle during his first year at St Mary's College, Dundalk, where he would go on to earn his Leaving Certificate in June 2019. Olatunde also joined his first athletics club, Dúndealgan AC, representing them at the County Louth Championships in the under-17 category at age 14. He enrolled at University College Dublin in 2019, studying computer science on an Ad Astra Elite scholarship.

== Career ==
=== 2018 ===
In his first indoor meet, Olatunde won the junior (U20) national title in the 60 m with a time of 6.99 s at the National Junior and U23 Indoor Championships. He also won the indoor juvenile (U17) national titles in both the 60 m and 200 m events.

During the outdoor season, a fifteen-year old Olatunde captured the U20 national title in the 100 m. He qualified for his first international event, the 2018 European Athletics U18 Championships, where he competed in the 100 m event and was eliminated in the semifinals. Olatunde also won the U17 national title in the 200 m. In August, he set a new personal best in the same distance by clocking a 22.13 at the Celtic Games.

Olatunde was named the 2018 Athletics Ireland Juvenile Star for County Louth.

=== 2019 ===
On 27 January, Olatunde set a national U18 record in the 60 m by running 6.84 s to win his second consecutive Irish U20 title. He also won the U18 title in the same distance at the National Juvenile Championships, setting a new championship best by running 6.90 s.

On 29 June, Olatunde set the national U18 record in the 100 m with a time of 10.63 s at the Mannheim Gala in Germany. He also helped the 4 × 100 metres relay team record a time of 40.40 s, which was the second-fastest time ever ran by an Irish U20 team. Olatunde was selected to represent Ireland at the European Youth Olympic Festival in July, competing in the 100 m and the Swedish medley relay. He placed seventh in both events.

=== 2020 ===
Olatunde won his third straight national U20 title in the 60 m with a time of 6.91 s. He subsequently competed in the discipline at the Irish Universities Athletics Association (IUAA) Indoor Championships and the Irish Indoor National Championships, though his times were not fast enough to medal at either meet.

=== 2021 ===
On 21 February, Olatunde finished second in the 60 m at the Elite Micro Meet after clocking 6.73 s, breaking both the national U20 and U23 records. He competed in the 60 m event at the European Athletics Indoor Championships in Poland, but was eliminated in his heat with a time of 6.79 s in his major championship debut.

In the outdoor season, Olatunde won the national U20 title in the 100 m in a time of 10.51 s. A week later, he won his first national senior title in the same distance with a new personal best of 10.49 s at the Irish National Championships, beating the defending champion Stephen Gaffney in the final. Olatunde competed at the European U20 Championships in July, where he ran in both the 100 m and the 4 × 100 metres relay but failed to qualify for the final in either.

=== 2022 ===
In his first competitive run of the season, Olatunde ran 6.67 s in round one of the National Indoor League to break his own national U23 record in the 60 m. Two weeks later in round two, he shaved three-hundredths of a second off the record with a time of 6.64 s. Olatunde rounded off January by winning the Irish University title in 6.66 s. At the National Championships, he ran a personal best of 6.62 s to set a championship record and claim his first national indoor title. It was only one-hundredth of a second slower than the Irish national record, but it secured his spot in the following month's World Indoor Championships. After capturing the national U23 title in a championship-record time of 6.63 s, Olatunde travelled to Serbia to compete in the 60 m event at the World Championships. He finished fourth in his heat after clocking 6.66 s and did not advance to the semifinals.

Olatunde opened the outdoor season with a gold-medal performance at the Irish University Championships, posting a time of 10.50 s in the 100 m. On 14 May, he ran a new personal best of 10.35 s to win gold at the Belfast Irish Milers Meet. On 2 June, Olatunde improved his time to 10.27 s, setting a national U23 record and moving him into third-place on the Irish all-time list. Later that month, he captured his second consecutive national senior title in the 100 m distance, followed by the national U23 title in July.

On 15 August, Olatunde ran a new personal best of 10.19 s in the 100 metres preliminary round at the 2022 European Athletics Championships, breaking his own U23 national record. The following day, he finished 6th in the final and set a new Irish record of 10.17 at the distance. It was the first ever appearance by an Irishman in the 100m final at a European Athletics Championships.

=== 2024 ===
He competed in the 4 × 100 m relay at the 2024 European Athletics Championships, alongside Bori Akinola, Mark Smyth and Colin Doyle.

== Personal life ==
Olatunde is a Christian. He is good friends with fellow Irish sprinter Rhasidat Adeleke.

== Achievements ==
=== Personal bests ===
All information taken from World Athletics profile.

Type	Event	Time	Date	Place	Notes
Outdoor	100 metres	10.08	16 August 2022	Munich, Germany	+0.1 m/s (wind), NR
Outdoor	200 metres	21.80	4 August 2021	Belfast, Northern Ireland	+0.6 m/s (wind)
Outdoor	4 × 100 metres relay	39.27	24 July 2022	Tullamore, Ireland	
Indoor	60 metres	6.57	19 February 2023	Abbotstown, Ireland	NR
Indoor	200 metres	22.39	27 January 2019	Athlone, Ireland	

=== International championships results ===
Representing Ireland
Year	Competition	Venue	Position	Event	Time	Wind (m/s)
2018	European U18 Championships	Győr, Hungary	5th (sf)	100 m	11.09	-0.9
2021	European Indoor Championships	Toruń, Poland	44th (h)	60 m	6.79	—N/a
2021	European U20 Championships	Tallinn, Estonia	3rd (sf)	100 m	10.51	+0.9
2021	European U20 Championships	Tallinn, Estonia	6th (h)	4 × 100 m relay	41.06	—N/a
2022	World Indoor Championships	Belgrade, Serbia	4th (h)	60 m	6.66	—N/a
2022	European Championships	Munich, Germany	6th	100 m	10.17	+0.1
2022	European Championships	Munich, Germany	–	4 × 100 m relay	DNF	—N/a
2023	European Indoor Championships	Istanbul, Turkey	18th (sf)	60 m	6.69	—N/a
2023	European U23 Championships	Espoo, Finland	8th	100 m	10.44	+2.1
2023	European U23 Championships	Espoo, Finland	5th	4 × 100 m relay	39.51	—N/a
2024	World Indoor Championships	Glasgow, United Kingdom	26th (h)	60 m	6.70	—N/a
2024	European Championships	Rome, Italy	19th (sf)	100 m	10.40	+0.7
2024	European Championships	Rome, Italy	13th (h)	4 × 100 m relay	39.34	—N/a
2026	European Championships	Birmingham, United Kingdom	20th (sf)	100 m	10.49	-0.6
2026	European Championships	Birmingham, United Kingdom	7th	4 × 100 m relay	40.26	—N/a

=== National titles ===
- National Championships
  - 100 m: 2021, 2022
- Indoor National Championships
  - 60 m: 2022
- IUAA Championships
  - 100 m: 2022
- IUAA Indoor Championships
  - 60 m: 2022
- U23 National Championships
  - 100 m: 2022
- U23 Indoor National Championships
  - 60 m: 2022
- U20 National Championships
  - 100 m: 2018, 2021
- U20 Indoor National Championships
  - 60 m: 2018, 2019, 2020
- Juvenile National Championships
  - 200 m: 2018 (Note: U17 events)
- Juvenile Indoor National Championships
  - 60 m: 2018, 2019 (Note: U18 events)
  - 200 m: 2018
