= Ibrahim Camara (sprinter) =

Belgian sprinter (born 2004)

Personal information
- Born: 2 February 2004 (age 22)

Sport
- Sport: Athletics
- Event: Sprint
Medal record
Men's athletics
Representing Belgium
European Championships
Bronze medal – third place	2026 Birmingham	4 × 100 m relay

Ibrahim Camara (born 2 February 2004) is a Belgian sprinter. He won the bronze medal with the Belgium men's 4 × 100 m relay team at the 2026 European Championships.

== Biography ==
Born in Ganshoren, Camara is a member of Royal White Star Athletic Club in Brussels.

Camara equalled the Belgian under-23 record for the 100 metres set by Anthony Ferro in 2001, with a time of 10.26 seconds in placing third at the Belgian Championships in July 2026. The following month, Camara was selected to compete for Belgium at the 2026 European Athletics Championships in Birmingham, England. On 15 August, Camara won the bronze medal in the men's 4 × 100 m relay final alongside Antoine Snyders, Simon Verherstraeten and Emiel Botterman.
