= Emiel Botterman =

Belgian sprinter (born 2002)

Personal information
- Nationality: Belgian
- Born: 2 October 2002 (age 23)

Sport
- Sport: Athletics
- Event: Sprints
Medal record
Men's athletics
Representing Belgium
European Championships
Bronze medal – third place	2026 Birmingham	4 × 100 m relay

Emiel Botterman (born 2 October 2002) is a Belgian sprinter.

== Career ==
In August 2025, Botterman competed at the Belgian Championships and won the national championship in the 100 meters. As a result, he was selected to represent Belgium at the 2025 World Athletics Championships. At the World Championships he competed in the 4 × 100 metres relay and finished in fifth place in the heats with a national record time of 38.46 seconds.

In August 2026, he competed at the 2026 European Athletics Championships in the 100 meters. He won his heat with a time of 10.42 seconds and advanced to the semifinals. He was part of the Belgian quartet team that won a historic bronze medal in the 4 × 100 metres relay with a time of 38.70 seconds. This was Belgium's first ever medal in the event at an international competition.
