= Adrian Brzeziński =

Polish sprinter

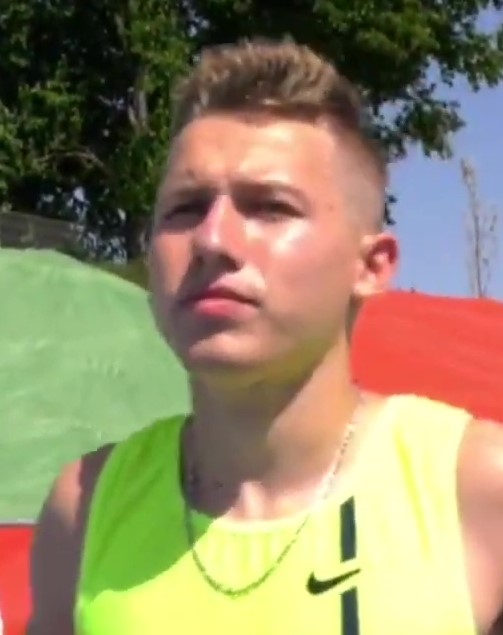
- Brzeziński in 2019

Personal information
- Nationality: Polish
- Born: 24 August 1998 (age 27)

Sport
- Sport: Athletics
- Event(s): 100 metres, 200 metres, long jump
- Club: MKL Toruń

Achievements and titles
- Personal bests: Outdoor; 100 m: 10.32 (Ruda Śląska 2022); 200 m: 20.77 (Toruń 2022); Long jump: 7.60 m (Ruda Śląska 2022); Indoor; 60 m: 6.57 (Toruń 2022); 200 m: 21.06 (Toruń 2021); 300 m: 34.77 (Toruń 2019); Long jump: 7.57 m (Toruń 2023)
Medal record
Men's athletics
Representing Poland
European Championships
Bronze medal – third place	2022 Munich	4×100 m relay

Adrian Brzeziński (born 24 August 1998) is a Polish sprinter and long jumper. He won a bronze medal in the 4×100 m relay at the 2022 European Athletics Championships, setting a Polish national record of 38.15 seconds in the process. He is also a two-time national indoor champion in the 200 metres, having won the event in 2019 and 2021.
