= 2024 European Athletics Championships – Men's 100 metres =

Men's 100 metres at the 2024 European Athletics Championships
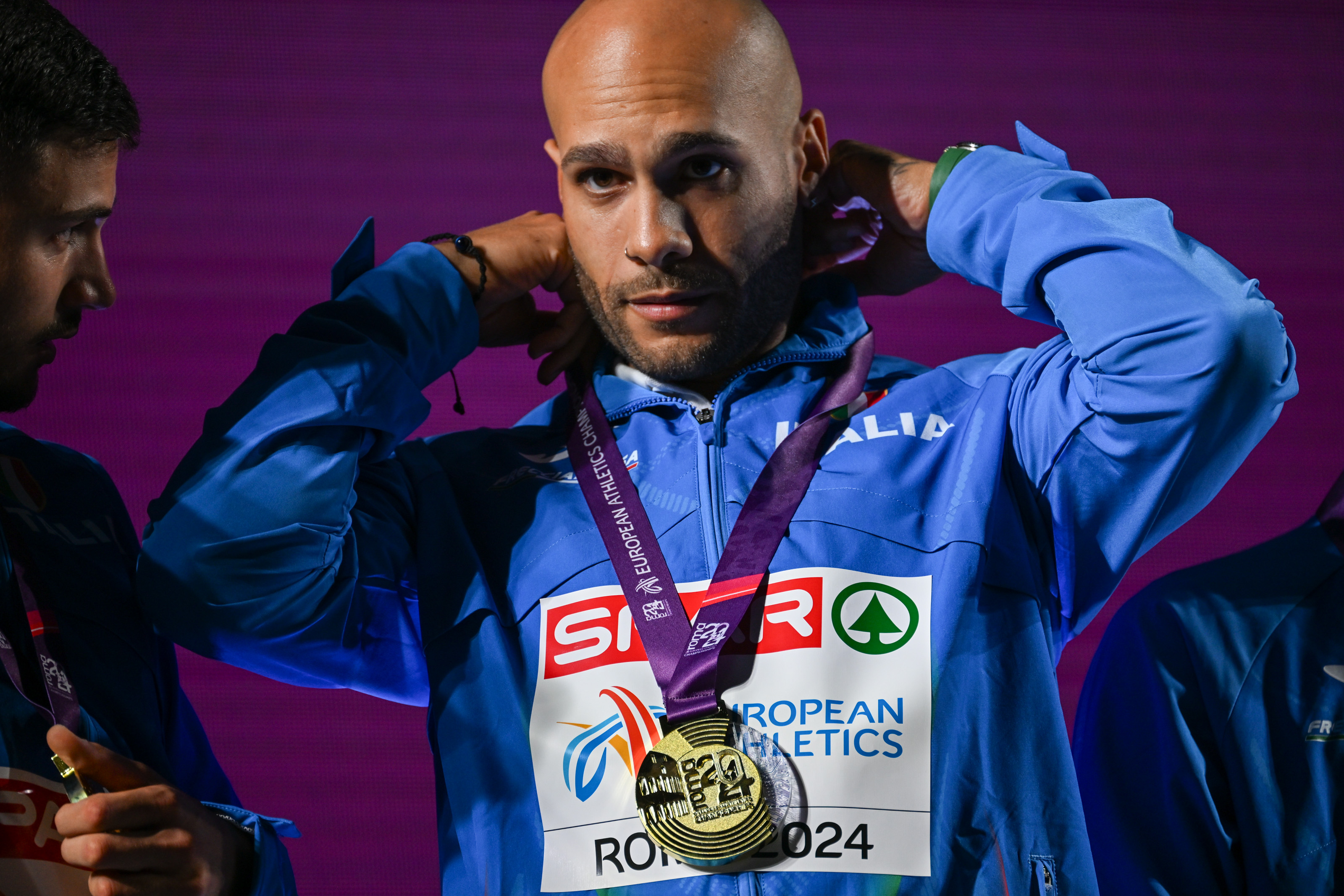
- The winner Marcell Jacobs
- Venue: Stadio Olimpico
- Location: Rome
- Dates: 7 June (round 1); 8 June (semifinals & final)
- Competitors: 36 from 23 nations
- Winning time: 10.02

Medalists
gold medal	Marcell Jacobs	Italy
silver medal	Chituru Ali	Italy
bronze medal	Romell Glave	Great Britain

The men's 100 metres at the 2024 European Athletics Championships took place at the Stadio Olimpico on 7 and 8 June.

== Records ==
Standing records prior to the 2024 European Athletics Championships
World record	Usain Bolt (JAM)	9.58	Berlin, Germany	16 August 2009
European record	Marcell Jacobs (ITA)	9.80	Tokyo, Japan	1 August 2021
Championship record	Zharnel Hughes (GBR)	9.95	Berlin, Germany	7 August 2018
Championship record	Lamont Marcell Jacobs (ITA)	9.95	Munich, Germany	16 August 2022
World Leading	Oblique Seville (JAM)	9.82	Kingston, Jamaica	1 June 2024
Europe Leading	Jeremiah Azu (GBR)	9.97	Leverkusen, Germany	25 May 2024

== Schedule ==
Date	Time	Round
7 June 2024	21:10	Round 1
8 June 2024	21:10	Semifinals
8 June 2024	22:53	Final

All times are local times (UTC+2)

== Results ==
=== Round 1 ===
The next 14 fastest (q) advanced to the semifinals. The 10 highest ranked athletes received a bye into the semifinals.

==== Heat 1 ====
Rank	Lane	Athlete	Nation	Time	Notes
1	8	Pablo Matéo	France	10.18	q
2	6	Matteo Melluzzo	Italy	10.21	q
3	5	Simon Hansen	Denmark	10.22	q
4	9	William Reais	Switzerland	10.35	q, SB
5	2	Carlos Nascimento	Portugal	10.35	q, SB
6	3	Marek Zakrzewski	Poland	10.36	
7	4	Zdeněk Stromšík	Czech Republic	10.39	
8	7	Aleksa Kijanović	Serbia	10.54	
				Wind: +0.2 m/s	

==== Heat 2 ====
Rank	Lane	Athlete	Nation	Time	Notes
1	8	Oliwer Wdowik	Poland	10.26	q
2	7	Robin Ganter	Germany	10.29	q
3	6	Israel Olatunde	Ireland	10.31	q, SB
4	3	Roberto Rigali	Italy	10.34	q
5	4	Ján Volko	Slovakia	10.35	q, SB
6	5	Jan Veleba	Czech Republic	10.53	SB
7	2	Francesco Sansovini	San Marino	10.55	SB
–	9	Méba-Mickaël Zeze	France	DQ	TR16.8
				Wind: +0.8 m/s	

==== Heat 3 ====
Rank	Lane	Athlete	Nation	Time	Notes
1	2	Chijindu Ujah	Great Britain	10.23	q
2	3	Guillem Crespí	Spain	10.25	q
3	8	Kayhan Özer	Turkey	10.34	q
4	6	Anej Čurin Prapotnik	Slovenia	10.34	q
5	4	Ioannis Nyfantopoulos	Greece	10.40	
6	5	Isak Hughes	Sweden	10.40	SB
7	9	Karl Erik Nazarov	Estonia	10.49	SB
8	7	Craig Gill	Gibraltar	11.17	SB
				Wind: +0.5 m/s	

=== Semifinals ===
The first 2 in each heat (Q) and the next 2 fastest (q) advance to the final. *Athletes that received a bye into the semifinal

==== Heat 1 ====
Rank	Lane	Athlete	Nation	Time	Notes
1	5	Romell Glave*	Great Britain	10.11	Q
2	7	Henrik Larsson*	Sweden	10.14	Q
3	4	Robin Ganter	Germany	10.21	q
4	9	Oliwer Wdowik	Poland	10.25	
5	6	Markus Fuchs*	Austria	10.29	
6	3	William Reais	Switzerland	10.32	SB
7	2	Israel Olatunde	Ireland	10.40	
–	8	Matteo Melluzzo	Italy	DNF	
				Wind: +0.7 m/s	

==== Heat 2 ====
Rank	Lane	Athlete	Nation	Time	Notes
1	6	Chituru Ali*	Italy	10.11	Q
2	4	Owen Ansah*	Germany	10.18	Q
3	5	Dominik Kopeć*	Poland	10.28	
4	7	Taymir Burnet*	Netherlands	10.33	
5	2	Roberto Rigali	Italy	10.36	
6	8	Ján Volko	Slovakia	10.38	
7	9	Carlos Nascimento	Portugal	10.43	
8	3	Kayhan Özer	Turkey	10.45	
				Wind: +0.3 m/s	

==== Heat 3 ====
Rank	Lane	Athlete	Nation	Time	Notes
1	5	Lamont Marcell Jacobs*	Italy	10.05	Q
2	3	Pablo Matéo	France	10.17	Q, =SB
3	9	Guillem Crespí	Spain	10.19	q, PB
4	8	Simon Hansen	Denmark	10.22	R
5	4	Chijindu Ujah	Great Britain	10.24	
6	7	Yannick Wolf*	Germany	10.32	
7	2	Anej Čurin Prapotnik	Slovenia	10.44	
8	6	Samuli Samuelsson*	Finland	10.59	SB
				Wind: +0.5 m/s	

=== Final ===
Robin Ganter withdrew from the final and was replaced by the next best performer from the semi-finals, Simon Hansen.

Rank	Lane	Athlete	Nation	Time	Notes
1st place, gold medalist(s)	5	Lamont Marcell Jacobs	Italy	10.02	SB
2nd place, silver medalist(s)	7	Chituru Ali	Italy	10.05	PB
3rd place, bronze medalist(s)	4	Romell Glave	Great Britain	10.06	
4	6	Henrik Larsson	Sweden	10.16	
5	3	Owen Ansah	Germany	10.17	
6	2	Guillem Crespí	Spain	10.18	PB
7	9	Simon Hansen	Denmark	10.19	PB
8	8	Pablo Mateo	France	10.22	
–	–	Robin Ganter	Germany	DNS	
				Wind: +0.7 m/s	
