= Louie Hinchliffe =

British athlete (born 2002)

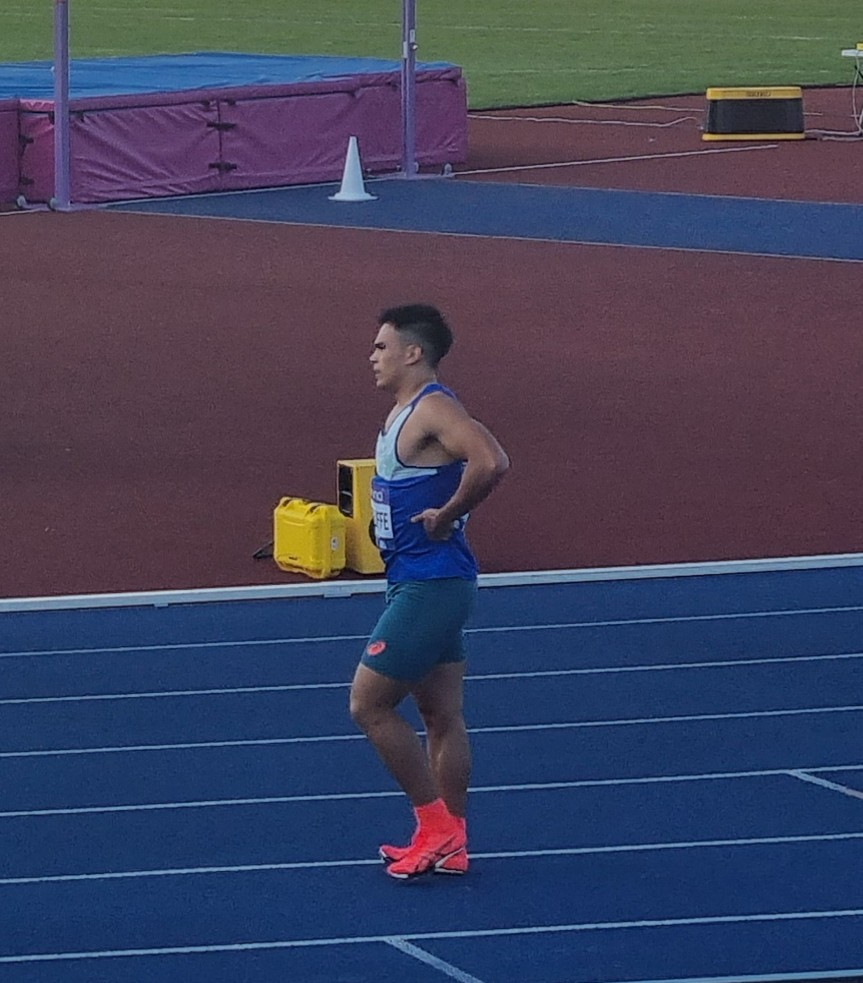
- Hinchliffe at the 2025 UK Athletics Championships

Personal information
- Nationality: British (English)
- Born: 18 July 2002 (age 24) Sheffield, England
- Employer: ASICS
- Height: 1.75 m (5 ft 9 in)

Sport
- Sport: Athletics
- Event: Sprint
- College team: Houston Cougars
- Club: Sheffield and Dearne
- Coached by: Carl Lewis

Achievements and titles
- Personal bests: 100 m: 9.95 (Eugene, 2024)
Medal record
Men's athletics
Representing Great Britain
Olympic Games
Bronze medal – third place	2024 Paris	4 × 100 m relay
European Championships
Gold medal – first place	2026 Birmingham	4 × 100 m relay

Louie Hinchliffe (born 18 July 2002) is a British sprinter. On 7 June 2024, he won the 2024 NCAA Championships 100 metres title with a time of 9.95 seconds for the University of Houston Cougars. That month, he also won the 100 m title at the British Athletics Championships. Selected for his first Olympic Games later that month, Hinchliffe was part of the Great Britain team that won bronze in the men's 4 × 100 metre relay in Paris 2024. In 2025, Hinchliffe signed a partnership with ASICS.

== Early life ==
Hinchliffe is from the Sheffield suburb of Crosspool and is a member of Sheffield and Dearne Athletic Club. He attended Notre Dame High School and studied business and IT at Lancaster University.

== Career ==
He competed for Great Britain in the 2021 European Athletics U20 Championships, where he reached the semi-finals of the 200 metres. He then spent his freshman year competing for Washington State University. He won the English national 100 m title in 2022. He lowered his personal best for the 100 metres to 10.23 in April 2023 in Walnut, California. He was selected for the 2023 European Athletics U23 Championships in Espoo.

After transferring to the University of Houston, he began being coached by Carl Lewis. In May 2024 he lowered his wind-legal personal best to 10.00 in Fayetteville, Arkansas and then ran a wind-assisted 100 metres in 9.84 seconds to qualify for the 2024 NCAA Championship finals. Competing at the 2024 NCAA Division I Outdoor Track and Field Championships in Eugene, Oregon he won the 100 metres title with a run of 9.95 seconds. He became the first European to win the title and placed him as the sixth fastest Briton of-all-time.

On 29 June 2024, he won the 100 metres title at the 2024 British Athletics Championships in Manchester, his first national title, and the first sprinter to win the NCAA Division 1 and British titles in the same season. On 5 July 2024, he was selected to represent Great Britain at the 2024 Summer Olympics in the 100 metres as well as being included in the 4 × 100 metres relay squad. Hinchliffe went out in the 100 metres semi-finals at the Games in Paris despite breaking ten seconds twice and also beating eventual gold medalist winner Noah Lyles in the first round, but ended the event as the highest ranked British athlete. Days later, he ran the final as Great Britain won a bronze medal in the 4 × 100 metres relay, his first senior medal.

Following the Olympic Games in 2024, he made the decision to turn professional and left the University of Houston to train under former Great Britain teammate Richard Kilty. However, a stress fracture and hamstring injuries restricted his ability to race for large parts of 2025, and he had to overcome the loss of his father. On 2 August 2025, he ran 10.01 seconds to place third in the 100 metres at the 2025 UK Athletics Championships in Birmingham, behind Zharnel Hughes and Jeremiah Azu. In September 2025, he competed in the men's 4 × 100 metres at the 2025 World Championships in Tokyo, Japan.

In February 2026, Hinchliffe completed a student-athlete reinstatement process and returned to the University of Houston to work under sprint coach Carl Lewis. In May, Hinchliffe ran 10.01 seconds for the 100 m at the West Regionals to qualify for the 2026 NCAA Outdoor Championships. On 20 June, he ran 10.03 seconds to place third in the 100 m final at the 2026 UK Athletics Championships, equal on time with Jeremiah Azu. He was selected to represent England at the 2026 Commonwealth Games in Glasgow. On 11 August, he qualified for the final of the 100 metres at the 2026 European Athletics Championships in Birmingham, but was a late withdrawal from the final. On 15 August, he won the gold medal with the men's 4 × 100 metres relay team at the championships alongside Azu, Hughes, and Romell Glave.

== Personal life ==
Hinchliffe's father Stuart was from Rotherham and his mother Leilana is from the Philippines. His father died of cancer shortly after the 2024 Olympic Games.

Hinchliffe was a successful junior golfer, playing from a single-figure handicap. He has a sister who has also competed in athletics, as a hurdler.
