= Owen Ansah =

German athlete (born 2000)

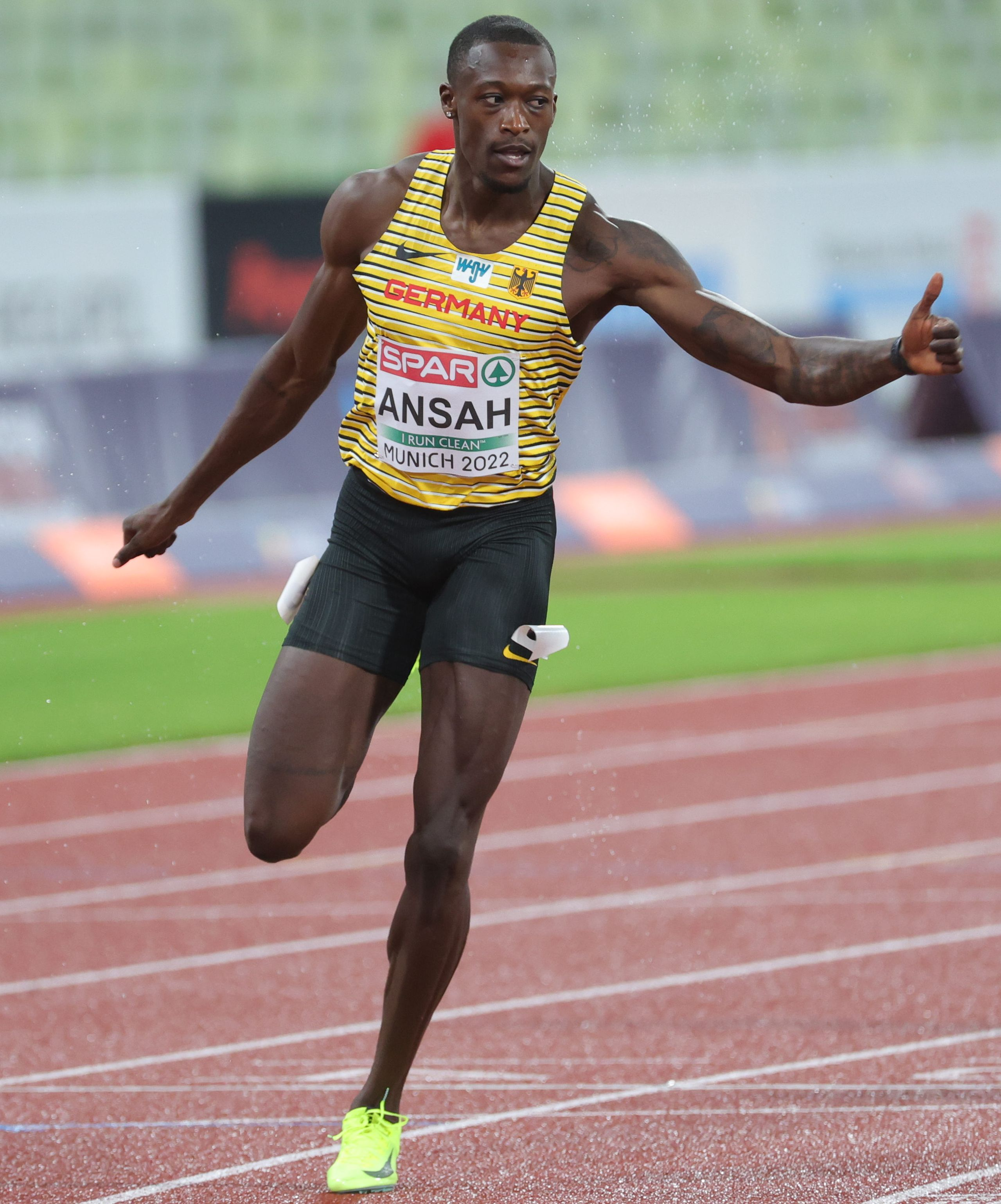
- Ansah in 2022

Personal information
- Nationality: German
- Born: 28 November 2000 (age 25) Hamburg, Germany
- Height: 1.90 m (6 ft 3 in)

Sport
- Sport: Athletics
- Events: Sprints; Relays
- Club: Hamburger SV
- Coached by: Sebastian Bayer

Achievements and titles
- Personal bests: Outdoor; 100 m: 9.98 NR (2026); 200 m: 20.04 (2026); Indoor; 60 m: 6.55 (2026)
Medal record
Men's athletics
Representing Germany
European Championships
Gold medal – first place	2026 Birmingham	200 m
Bronze medal – third place	2024 Rome	4 × 100 m relay
Bronze medal – third place	2026 Birmingham	100 m
World Relays
Bronze medal – third place	2026 Gaborone	4 × 100 m relay

Owen Ansah (born 28 November 2000) is a German sprinter, the first German to run under 10 seconds for the 100 metres. He has won German national titles over 100 and 200 metres, and the Indoor national title over 60 metres. He won the gold medal in the 200 metres and the bronze medal in the 100 metres at the 2026 European Championships. He also won a bronze medal at the 2024 European Championships in the men's 4 × 100 metres relay.

== Biography ==
Ansah grew up in Hamburg and started athletics in 2014. In 2021, he became German champion in the 200 meters in Braunschweig running a time of 20.89 seconds. That year, he was part of the German 4 × 200 m relay team which won gold at the 2021 World Athletics Relays. He travelled to Tokyo as part of the German sprint relay team for the delayed 2020 Olympic Games, but did not compete.

In Leipzig in February 2022, he won the German national title over 200 metres indoors. In June 2022, he won German national titles over both 100 metres and 200 metres in Berlin. He competed at the 2022 World Athletics Championships in Eugene, Oregon over 200 metres.

He set a new personal best over 60 metres at the start of 2023, but missed most of the year with injury. He qualified for the final at the 2024 European Athletics Championships in Rome over 100 metres. He finished fifth in the final in 10.17 seconds. Later on at the championships, he was a bronze medalist in the 4 × 100 metres relay. In June 2024, he won the 100 metres at the German Championships in Braunschweig, breaking the 10-second barrier for the first time. He competed in the 100 metres at the 2024 Paris Olympics. He also competed in the men's 4 × 100 m relay at the Games.

He competed at the 2025 World Athletics Relays in China in the Men's 4 × 100 metres relay in May 2025. On the second day of the competition he helped Germany place sixth overall, having previously helped the country secure a qualifying place for the upcoming World Championships. In September 2025, he competed in the 100 metres at the 2025 World Championships in Tokyo, Japan. He also ran in the men's 4 × 100 metres relay at the championships as the German team placed fifth.

In February 2026, he ran the 60 metres in 6.55 seconds in Karlsruhe. Later that month, he equalled his personal best 6.55 seconds to win the German Indoor Championships 60 metres race on 28 February 2026. As part of the Germany squad for the 4 × 100 metres relay at the 2026 World Athletics Relays in Gaborone, Botswana, he was a member of the men's team which ran a national record 37.67 seconds to earn a qualification spot for the final on the opening day. The following day, the quartet won the bronze medal in the final running a time of 37.76. Competing at the Sparkassen Open in Regensburg on 6 June, he set a new national record of 9.98 seconds for the 100 metres.

Ansah placed fourth in the 100 metres at the 2026 Herculis event in Monaco in July. However, prior to the event as he was preparing to leave to travel to France for the competition, he was visited by an anti-doping official but did not give a sample claiming he feared he would miss his flight. Ansah also claimed that the doping control officer neither offered him an alternative way of completing the test nor explained the possible consequences of a refusal. Ansah was reported to have been subsequently tested by the World Anti-Doping Agency on the day of competition in Monaco, and again by Germany's National Anti-Doping Agency (NADA) the following Monday. That month, NADA announced that it had opened a results management procedure against him, investigating under a rule which bars athletes from evading, refusing or failing to submit to doping tests, but that he was not immediately suspended from competition. Continuing with his season, Ansah completed a sprint double at the German Championships winning both the 100 metres and 200 metres titles in Bochum later that month, improving his 200 m personal best to 20.13 seconds. On 11 August, Ansah won the 100 metres bronze medal representing Germany at the 2026 European Athletics Championships in Birmingham, finishing behind a British one-two finish of Romell Glave and Jeremiah Azu. Later at the championships he won the gold medal in the 200 m final with a wind-assisted 19.95 seconds (+2.5 m/s) ahead of Britain's Zharnel Hughes. Speaking after the race, Ansah said "My coach always told me I am a 200 m sprinter. Today I finally believed it". Ansah was reportedly not considered for selection for the sprint relays at the championships due to the ongoing investigation and the potential knock-on impact upon relay teammates.

== Personal life ==
He is of Ghanaian heritage.
