= Simon Verherstraeten =

Belgian sprinter (born 1999)

Personal information
- Born: 14 January 1999 (age 27)

Sport
- Sport: Athletics
- Event: Sprint

Achievements and titles
- Personal bests: 60 m: 6.52 (2026) NR; 100 m: 10.06 (2024); 200 m: 20.13 (2024) NR
Medal record
Men's athletics
Representing Belgium
European Championships
Bronze medal – third place	2026 Birmingham	4 × 100 m relay
European U23 Championships
Bronze medal – third place	2019 Gävle	4 × 100 m relay

Simon Verherstraeten (born 14 January 1999) is a Belgian sprinter. A multiple-time national champion, and the Belgian national record holder over 200 metres from 2024, in February 2026, he set a Belgian national record in the 60 metres.

== Biography ==
From Kessel, Belgium, Verherstraeten was a member of the Belgian 4 × 100 metres sprint relay team which won the bronze medal in the final at the 2019 European Athletics U23 Championships in Gävle, Sweden.

Verherstraeten was a member of the Belgian 4 × 100 metres sprint relay team which placed sixth in the final at the 2022 European Athletics Championships in Munich, Germany. In the semi-final, alongside Robin Vanderbemden, Ward Merckx, and Kobe Vleminckx they set a Belgian national record of 38.73 seconds, 32 hundredths of a second faster than the previous Belgian record set in 2003.

Verherstraeten competed for Belgium at the 2024 World Athletics Relays in Nassau, The Bahamas, where in a time with Merckx, Antoine Snyders and Vleminckx, they ran a time of 38:68, five hundredths faster than the previous national record they had achieved with a similar lineup at the 2022 European Championships. He was a member of the Belgian 4 × 100 metres sprint relay team which placed fourth in the final at the 2024 European Athletics Championships in Rome, Italy, missing out on a medal in the final by just over one hundredths of a second. In July 2024 in La Chaux-de-Fonds, he set a Belgian national record for the 200 metres of 20.13 seconds, breaking the record of Patrick Stevens who had held the record since 1996.

In May 2025, he competed at the 2025 World Athletics Relays in China, helping the Belgian 4 × 100 metres team qualify for the upcoming World Championships. In September 2025, he competed in the men's 4 × 100 metres at the 2025 World Championships in Tokyo, Japan.

In February 2026, he set a new Belgian national record in the 60 metres of 6.54 seconds, whilst competing in Apeldoorn, breaking the previous Belgian record set by Ronald Desruelles in 1985. He then won the Belgian Indoor Championships, running 6.52 seconds in the final. Competing in the 60 metres at the 2026 World Athletics Indoor Championships in Toruń, Poland, he ran 6.53 and 6.56 seconds on his way to reaching the final, however suffered an injury in the final and could not complete the race. In August 2026, he became the first Belgium male athlete to qualify for a 100 metres final at a European Athletics Championships. The fairy tale ended however in disappointment: due to cramps in both calves, he ended a distant eight and last, stating afterwards that "Three races in a day is too much". On 15 August, he won the bronze medal in the men's 4 × 100 m relay final alongside Antoine Snyders, Ibrahim Camara and Emiel Botterman. At the 2026 Diamond League Final in Brussels in September, he placed ninth over 100 metres.
