= Antoine Snyders =

Belgian sprinter (born 1997)

Personal information
- Born: 10 February 1997 (age 29)

Sport
- Sport: Athletics
- Event: Sprint
Medal record
Men's athletics
Representing Belgium
European Championships
Bronze medal – third place	2026 Birmingham	4 × 100 m relay
European U23 Championships
Bronze medal – third place	2019 Gävle	4 × 100 m relay

Antoine Snyders (born 10 February 1997) is a Belgian sprinter.

== Biography ==
A member of RFC Liégeois athletics club, Snyders was a member of the Belgian 4 × 100 metres sprint relay team which won the bronze medal in the final at the 2019 European Athletics U23 Championships in Gävle, Sweden.

Snyders competed for Belgium at the 2024 World Athletics Relays in Nassau, The Bahamas, where alongside Ward Merckx, Simon Verherstraeten and Kobe Vleminckx, they ran a time of 38:68, five hundredths faster than the previous national record they had achieved with a similar lineup at the 2022 European Championships. He was a member of the Belgian 4 × 100 metres sprint relay team which placed fourth in the final at the 2024 European Athletics Championships in Rome, Italy, missing out on a medal in the final by just over one hundredths of a second.

In May 2025, he competed at the 2025 World Athletics Relays in China, helping the Belgian 4 × 100 metres team qualify for the upcoming World Championships. In September 2025, he competed in the men's 4 × 100 metres at the 2025 World Championships in Tokyo, Japan.

In May 2026, he ran for Belgium in the 2026 World Athletics Relays in the mixed 4 × 100 metres relay. He also ran in the men's 4 × 100 metres relay at the championships in Gaborone, Botswana as Belgium qualified their men's team for the 2026 World Athletics Ultimate Championship. In July, he won the 2026 Belgian Championships 100 metres title. Snyders competed for Belgium at the 2026 European Athletics Championships in Birmingham, England, winning the bronze medal in the men's 4 × 100 m relay final alongside Verherstraeten, Ibrahim Camara and Emiel Botterman.
