= Kobe Vleminckx =

Belgian sprinter (born 1998)

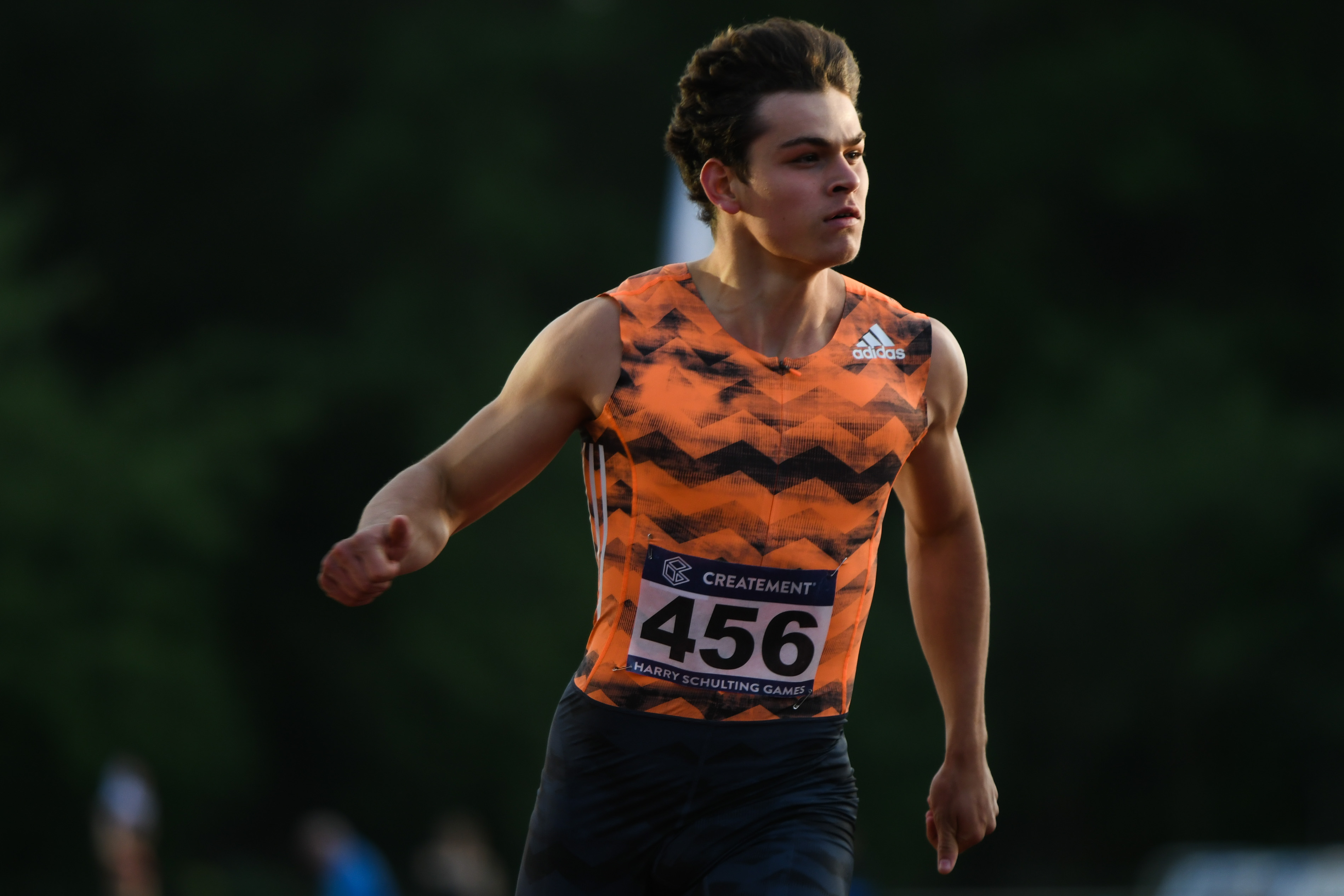
- Vleminckx in 2018

Personal information
- Born: 31 May 1998 (age 28)

Sport
- Sport: Athletics
- Event: Sprint

Achievements and titles
- Personal best(s): 60m: 6.63 (2024); 100m: 10.15 (2024); 200m: 20.23 (2024)
Medal record
Men's athletics
Representing Belgium
European U23 Championships
Silver medal – second place	2019 Gävle	200 m
Bronze medal – third place	2019 Gävle	4x100m relay

Kobe Vleminckx (born 31 May 1998) is a Belgian sprinter. He is a multiple-time national champion over 100 metres and was a silver medalist at the 2019 European Athletics U23 Championships over 200 metres.

== Biography ==
He won the silver medal in the 200 metres and was a member of the Belgian 4 x 100 metres sprint relay team which won the bronze medal in the final at the 2019 European Athletics U23 Championships in Gävle, Sweden. That year, he won the Belgian Athletics Championships over 100 metres, and retained the title the following year, but had to finish his season early due to persistent knee and hamstring injuries.

He returned to reach the semi-finals of the 60 metres at the 2021 European Athletics Indoor Championships in Poland. He won the Belgian national title again over 100 metres in June 2021.

He was a member of the Belgian 4 x 100 metres sprint relay team which placed sixth in the final at the 2022 European Athletics Championships in Munich, Germany. In the semi-final, alongside Robin Vanderbemden, Ward Merckx, and Simon Verherstraeten they set a Belgian national record of 38.73 seconds, 32 hundredths of a second faster than the previous Belgian record set in 2003.

He competed for Belgium at the 2024 World Athletics Relays in Nassau, The Bahamas, where alongside Merckx, Antoine Snyders and Verherstraeten ran a time of 38:68, five hundredths faster than the previous national record they had achieved with a similar lineup at the 2022 European Championships. He was a member of the Belgian 4 x 100 metres sprint relay team which placed fourth in the final at the 2024 European Athletics Championships in Rome, Italy, missing out on a medal in the final by just over one hundredths of a second. In July 2024, he ran new personal best times over 100 metres (10.15 seconds) and 200 metres (20.23 seconds) at the Résisprint International in La-Chaux-de-Fonds.

In February 2025, he ran an indoor personal best over 200 metres of 20.83 seconds to move to third on the Belgian all-time list. In May, he competed at the 2025 World Athletics Relays in China, helping the Belgian 4 x 100 metres team qualify for the upcoming World Championships. In September 2025, he competed in the men's 4 x 100 metres at the 2025 World Championships in Tokyo, Japan.

In May 2026, he ran in the 2026 World Athletics Relays in the mixed 4 × 100 metres relay in Gaborone, Botswana. He also ran in the men's 4 × 100 metres relay at the championships in Gaborone, Botswana.

== Personal life ==
He is from Oevel in Westerlo, in the Belgian province of Antwerp.
