= Lucas Ansah-Peprah =

German sprinter (born 2000)

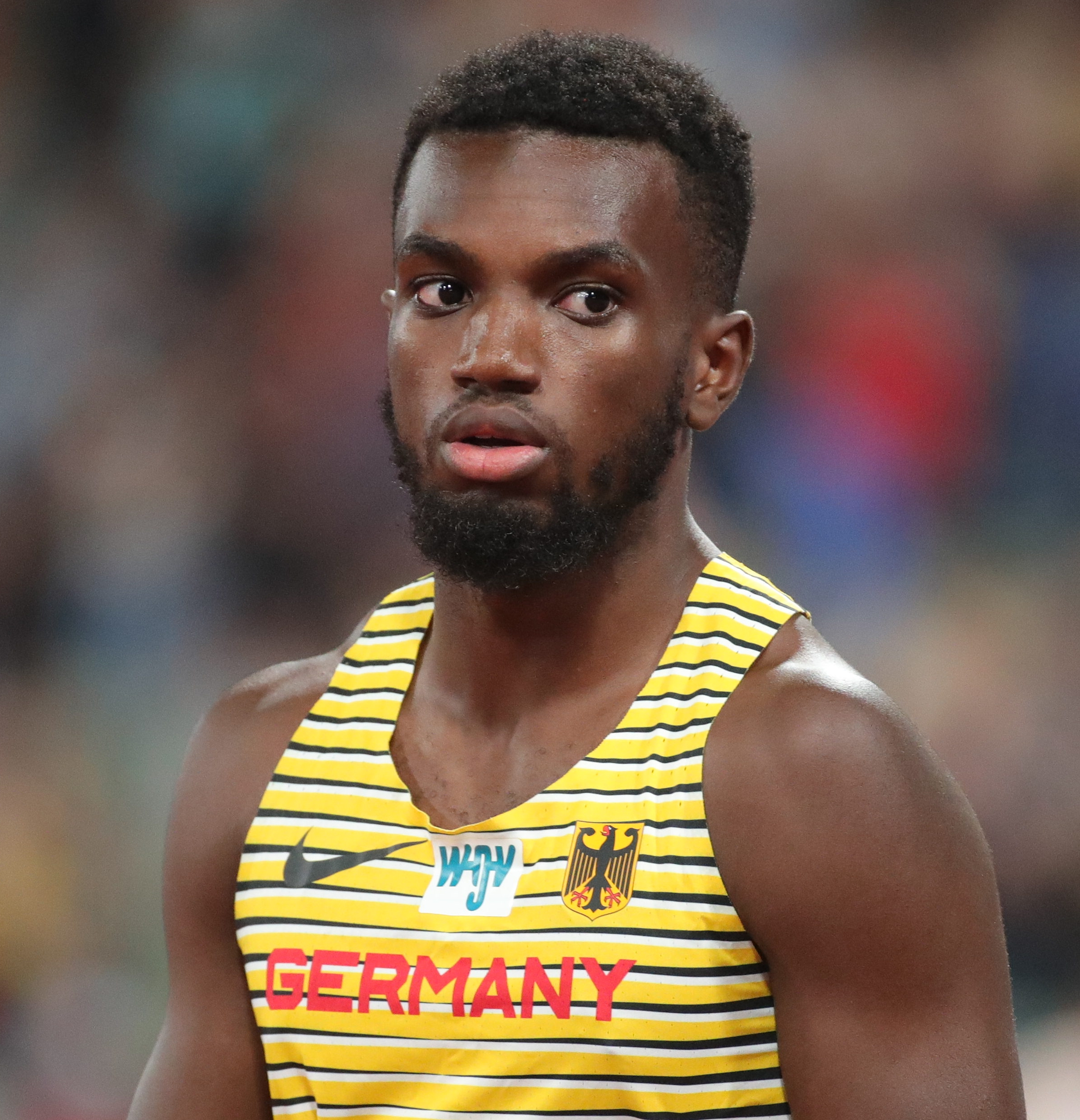
- Ansah-Peprah in 2022

Personal information
- Nationality: German
- Born: 16 January 2000 (age 26) Stuttgart, Germany
- Height: 1.83 m (6 ft 0 in)

Sport
- Sport: Athletics
- Events: Sprints; Relays
- Club: Hamburger SV
- Coached by: Sebastian Bayer

Achievements and titles
- Personal bests: Outdoor; 100 m: 10.00 (2024); 200 m: 20.43 (2025); Indoor; 60 m: 6.58 (2022)
Medal record
Men's athletics
Representing Germany
World Relays
| Bronze medal – third place | 2026 Gaborone | 4 × 100 m relay |
European Championships
| Silver medal – second place | 2026 Birmingham | 4 × 100 m relay |
| Bronze medal – third place | 2024 Rome | 4 × 100 m relay |

Lucas Ansah-Peprah (born 16 January 2000) is a German athlete. He competed in the men's 4 × 100 metres relay event at the 2020 Summer Olympics.

== Personal life ==
Born in Germany, Ansah-Peprah is of Ghanaian descent.
