= 2024 European Athletics Championships – Men's 200 metres =

Men's 200 metres at the 2024 European Athletics Championships
- Venue: Stadio Olimpico
- Location: Rome
- Dates: 9 June (round 1 & semi-finals); 10 June (final)
- Competitors: 34 from 23 nations
- Winning time: 20.28

Medalists
gold medal	Timothé Mumenthaler	Switzerland
silver medal	Filippo Tortu	Italy
bronze medal	William Reais	Switzerland

The men's 200 metres at the 2024 European Athletics Championships took place at the Stadio Olimpico on 9 and 10 June.

== Records ==
Standing records prior to the 2024 European Athletics Championships
World record	Usain Bolt (JAM)	19.19	Berlin, Germany	20 August 2009
European record	Pietro Mennea (ITA)	19.72	Mexico City, Mexico	12 September 1979
Championship record	Ramil Guliyev (TUR)	19.76	Berlin, Germany	9 August 2018
World Leading	Kenneth Bednarek (USA)	19.67	Doha, Qatar	10 May 2024
Europe Leading	Zharnel Hughes (GBR)	19.96	Kingston, Jamaica	11 May 2024

== Schedule ==
Date	Time	Round
9 June 2024	11:50	Round 1
9 June 2024	21:35	Semi-finals
10 June 2024	22:50	Final

All times are local times (UTC+2)

== Results ==
=== Round 1 ===
The 12 highest ranked athletes received a bye into the semi-finals. The next 12 fastest (Q) advance to the semi-finals.

==== Heat 1 ====
Rank	Lane	Athlete	Nation	Time	Notes
1	7	Roko Farkaš	Croatia	20.70	Q, NR
2	5	Gediminas Truskauskas	Lithuania	20.78	Q, SB
3	6	Eduard Kubelík	Czech Republic	20.91	Q
4	3	Łukasz Żok	Poland	20.97	
5	9	Ioannis Kariofyllis	Greece	21.00	
6	4	Samuel Purola	Finland	21.04	
7	8	Mathias Hove Johansen	Norway	21.21	
				Wind: -0.5 m/s	

==== Heat 2 ====
Rank	Lane	Athlete	Nation	Time	Notes
1	6	Tomáš Němejc	Czech Republic	20.54	Q, SB
2	9	Ramil Guliyev	Turkey	20.66	Q, SB
3	3	Oskars Grava	Latvia	20.78	Q, PB
4	5	Albert Komański	Poland	20.81	Q
5	7	Sotirios Gkaragkanis	Greece	20.91	Q
6	2	Linus Pihl	Sweden	20.95	R
7	8	Andrej Skočir	Slovenia	21.08	
8	4	Ján Volko	Slovakia	21.09	
				Wind: +1.0 m/s	

==== Heat 3 ====
Rank	Lane	Athlete	Nation	Time	Notes
1	9	Felix Svensson	Switzerland	20.52	Q
2	5	Erik Erlandsson	Sweden	20.55	Q, PB
3	8	Diego Aldo Pettorossi	Italy	20.56	Q, SB
4	3	Mark Smyth	Ireland	20.93	Q, SB
5	6	Patryk Wykrota	Poland	20.97	
6	7	Zoltán Wahl	Hungary	21.05	SB
–	4	Viljami Kaasalainen	Finland	DNS	
				Wind: -0.7 m/s	

=== Semi-finals ===
The first 2 in each heat (Q) and the next 2 fastest (q) advance to the final.

==== Heat 1 ====
Rank	Lane	Athlete	Nation	Time	Notes
1	6	Joshua Hartmann*	Germany	20.38	Q
2	7	Timothé Mumenthaler*	Switzerland	20.38	Q
3	4	Jona Efoloko*	Great Britain	20.73	
4	3	Gediminas Truskauskas	Lithuania	20.86	
5	9	Diego Aldo Pettorossi	Italy	20.88	
6	5	Linus Pihl	Sweden	20.91	PB
7	2	Sotirios Gkaragkanis	Greece	20.93	
8	8	Taymir Burnet*	Netherlands	21.02	
–	–	Eduard Kubelík	Czech Republic	DNS	
				Wind: +0.8 m/s	

==== Heat 2 ====
Rank	Lane	Athlete	Nation	Time	Notes
1	7	Pablo Matéo*	France	20.34	Q
2	4	Eseosa Fostine Desalu*	Italy	20.39	Q, SB
3	6	William Reais*	Switzerland	20.51	q
4	9	Tomáš Němejc	Czech Republic	20.52	q, PB
5	5	Erik Erlandsson	Sweden	20.52	q, PB
6	2	Oskars Grava	Latvia	20.79	
7	8	Jeriel Quainoo*	Great Britain	20.81	
8	3	Ramil Guliyev	Turkey	20.87	
				Wind: +1.2 m/s	

==== Heat 3 ====
Rank	Lane	Athlete	Nation	Time	Notes
1	8	Filippo Tortu*	Italy	20.14	Q, SB
2	9	Blessing Afrifah*	Israel	20.46	Q, SB
3	6	Ryan Zeze*	France	20.53	
4	4	Felix Svensson	Switzerland	20.66	
5	3	Mark Smyth	Ireland	20.86	SB
6	7	Ondřej Macík*	Czech Republic	20.89	
7	2	Roko Farkaš	Croatia	20.95	
–	5	Albert Komański	Poland	DNF	
				Wind: +0.9 m/s	

*Athletes that received a bye into the semi-final.

=== Final ===
Rank	Lane	Athlete	Nation	Time	Notes
1st place, gold medalist(s)	9	Timothé Mumenthaler	Switzerland	20.28	EU23L
2nd place, silver medalist(s)	6	Filippo Tortu	Italy	20.41	
3rd place, bronze medalist(s)	3	William Reais	Switzerland	20.47	
4	1	Erik Erlandsson	Sweden	20.57	
5	5	Eseosa Fostine Desalu	Italy	20.59	
6	2	Tomáš Nĕmejc	Czech Republic	20.91	
7	4	Blessing Akwasi Afrifah	Israel	20.97	
	7	Pablo Mateo	France	DQ	TR17.2.3
	8	Joshua Hartmann	Germany	DQ	TR16.8
				Wind: +0.8 m/s	
