= 2024 Czech Indoor Gala =

Athletics meeting in Ostrava, Czech Republic

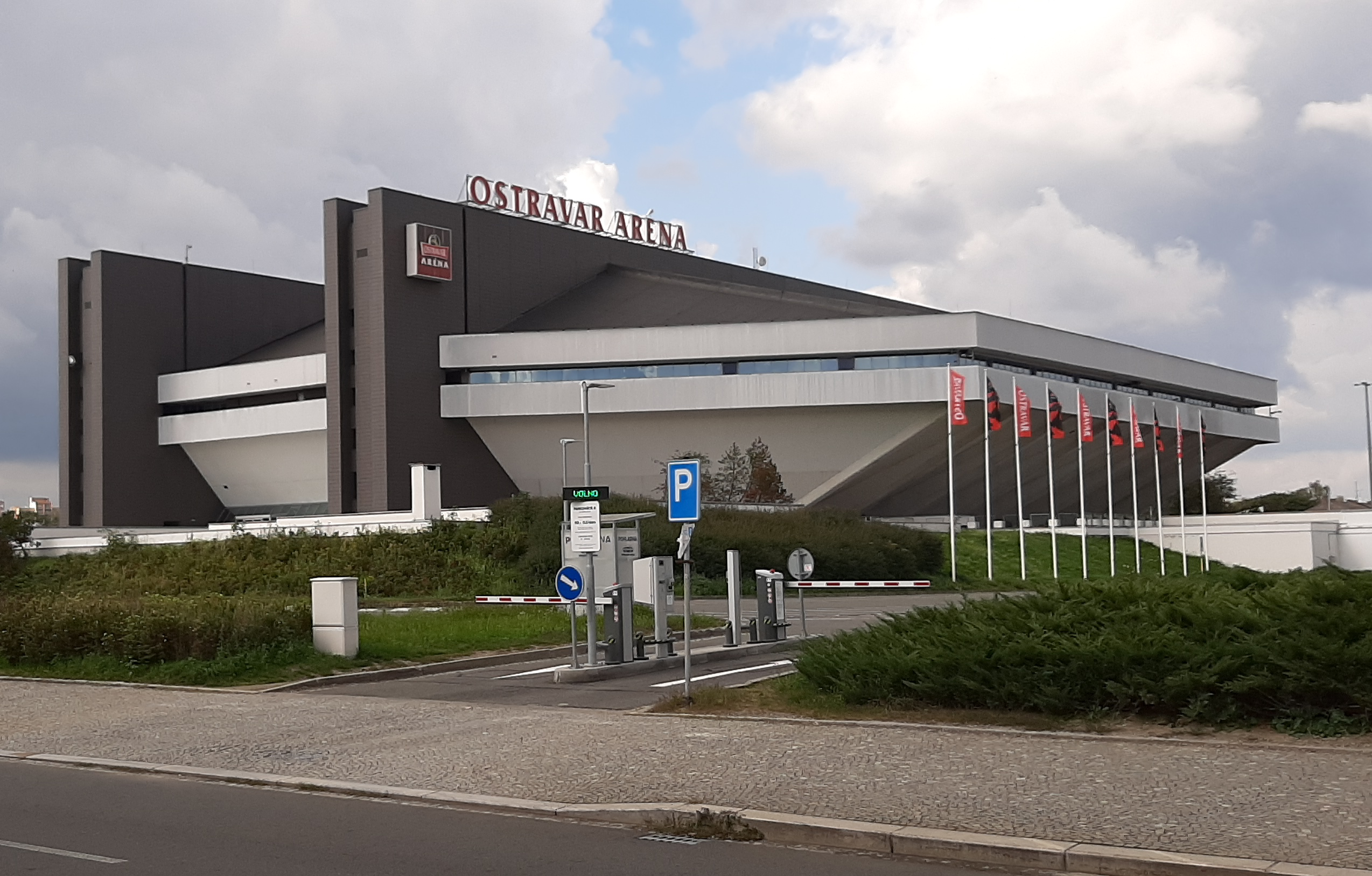
- Dates: 30 January 2024
- Host city: Ostrava, Czech Republic
- Venue: Vítkovice Athletic Hall
- Level: 2024 World Athletics Indoor Tour

The 2024 Czech Indoor Gala was the 8th edition of the annual indoor track and field meeting in Ostrava, Czech Republic. Held on 30 January, it was the second leg of the 2024 World Athletics Indoor Tour Gold – the highest-level international indoor track and field circuit.

The meeting was highlighted by Miltiadis Tentoglou making his season debut in the long jump against the Czech record-holder Radek Juska. In the mile run, Freweyni Hailu ran the 6th-fastest indoor mile of all time in 4:17.36.

== Results ==
=== World Athletics Indoor Tour ===
Men's 60m
Place	Athlete	Country	Time	Points
1st place, gold medalist(s)	Yoshihide Kiryū	Japan	6.53	10
2nd place, silver medalist(s)	Joshua Hartmann	Germany	6.57	7
3rd place, bronze medalist(s)	Henrik Larsson	Sweden	6.59	5
4	Jeremiah Azu	Great Britain	6.64	3
5	Kayhan Özer	Turkey	6.67	
6	Markus Fuchs	Austria	6.67	
7	Samuele Ceccarelli	Italy	6.74	
8	Jan Veleba	Czech Republic	6.80	

Men's 60m Round 1
Place	Athlete	Country	Time	Heat
1	Joshua Hartmann	Germany	6.54	2
2	Yoshihide Kiryū	Japan	6.55	2
3	Henrik Larsson	Sweden	6.60	2
4	Jeremiah Azu	Great Britain	6.66	1
5	Samuele Ceccarelli	Italy	6.73	1
6	Markus Fuchs	Austria	6.73	1
7	Jan Veleba	Czech Republic	6.76	2
8	Kayhan Özer	Turkey	6.78	1
9	Matyáš Koška	Czech Republic	6.78	2
10	Stanislav Jíra	Czech Republic	6.83	1
11	Joris van Gool	Netherlands	6.83	1
12	Filip Federič	Slovakia	6.84	2
13	Tobiáš Dvorský	Czech Republic	6.85	1
14	Eduard Kubelík	Czech Republic	6.87	2
15	Tomáš Košík	Slovakia	6.90	1
16	Tomáš Lisák	Czech Republic	6.95	2

Men's 800m
Place	Athlete	Country	Time	Points
1st place, gold medalist(s)	Tshepiso Masalela	Botswana	1:46.41	10
2nd place, silver medalist(s)	Catalin Tecuceanu	Italy	1:46.90	7
3rd place, bronze medalist(s)	Mateusz Borkowski	Poland	1:47.33	5
4	Jakub Dudycha	Czech Republic	1:47.42	3
5	Daniel Kotyza	Czech Republic	1:47.54	
6	Filip Šnejdr	Czech Republic	1:47.69	
7	Mohamed Ali Gouaned	Algeria	1:48.44	
	Patryk Sieradzki	Poland	DNF	
	Daniel Rowden	Great Britain	DNF	

Men's Shot Put
Place	Athlete	Country	Mark	Points
1st place, gold medalist(s)	Roger Steen (shot putter)	United States	21.38 m	10
2nd place, silver medalist(s)	Tomáš Staněk	Czech Republic	21.33 m	7
3rd place, bronze medalist(s)	Tom Walsh	New Zealand	21.17 m	5
4	Chukwuebuka Enekwechi	Nigeria	21.08 m	3
5	Filip Mihaljević	Croatia	20.91 m	
6	Rajindra Campbell	Jamaica	20.76 m	
7	Michał Haratyk	Poland	20.05 m	
8	Tadeáš Procházka	Czech Republic	18.69 m	

Women's 400m
Place	Athlete	Country	Time	Heat	Points
1st place, gold medalist(s)	Lieke Klaver	Netherlands	50.54	1	10
2nd place, silver medalist(s)	Henriette Jæger	Norway	51.57	1	7
3rd place, bronze medalist(s)	Lada Vondrová	Czech Republic	52.05	1	5
4	Andrea Miklós	Romania	52.39	2	3
5	Susanne Gogl-Walli	Austria	52.63	2	
6	Jessie Knight	Great Britain	52.64	1	
7	Nikoleta Jíchová	Czech Republic	52.78	1	
8	Justyna Święty-Ersetic	Poland	53.36	2	
9	Tereza Petržilková	Czech Republic	53.44	2	
10	Lurdes Gloria Manuel	Czech Republic	54.18	2	
	Daniela Ledecká	Slovakia	DNF	2	

Women's Mile
Place	Athlete	Country	Time	Points
1st place, gold medalist(s)	Freweyni Hailu	Ethiopia	4:17.36	10
2nd place, silver medalist(s)	Hirut Meshesha	Ethiopia	4:19.53	7
3rd place, bronze medalist(s)	Saron Berhe	Ethiopia	4:24.23	5
4	Netsanet Desta	Ethiopia	4:24.80	3
5	Agathe Guillemot	France	4:29.02	
6	Sofia Thøgersen	Denmark	4:29.31	
7	Elise Vanderelst	Belgium	4:29.31	
8	Ludovica Cavalli	Italy	4:30.15	
9	Claudia Bobocea	Romania	4:34.96	
10	Simona Vrzalová	Czech Republic	4:35.76	
11	Diana Mezuliáníková	Czech Republic	4:36.60	
	Salomé Afonso	Portugal	DNF	
	Aneta Lemiesz	Poland	DNF	
	Naomi Korir	Kenya	DNF	

Women's 60mH
Place	Athlete	Country	Time	Points
1st place, gold medalist(s)	Pia Skrzyszowska	Poland	7.82	10
2nd place, silver medalist(s)	Nadine Visser	Netherlands	7.93	7
3rd place, bronze medalist(s)	Sarah Lavin	Ireland	7.93	5
4	Alaysha Johnson	United States	7.94	3
5	Amber Hughes	United States	8.03	
6	Viktória Forster	Slovakia	8.07	
7	Cortney Jones	United States	8.09	
8	Tereza Elena Sinova	Czech Republic	8.14	

Women's 60mH Round 1
Place	Athlete	Country	Time	Heat
1	Pia Skrzyszowska	Poland	7.88	2
2	Nadine Visser	Netherlands	7.95	1
3	Sarah Lavin	Ireland	7.95	2
4	Alaysha Johnson	United States	8.01	1
5	Amber Hughes	United States	8.01	2
6	Cortney Jones	United States	8.04	2
7	Viktória Forster	Slovakia	8.06	1
8	Tereza Elena Sinova	Czech Republic	8.15	1
9	Helena Jiranová	Czech Republic	8.15	2
10	Anne Zagré	Belgium	8.22	1
11	Klaudia Siciarz	Poland	8.25	1
12	Stanislava Škvarková	Slovakia	8.28	1
13	Tereza Vokálová	Czech Republic	8.45	2
14	Ester Bendová	Czech Republic	8.46	1
15	Nicoleta Turnerová	Czech Republic	8.48	2

=== Indoor Meeting ===
Men's 200m
Place	Athlete	Country	Time	Heat
1st place, gold medalist(s)	Eduard Kubelík	Czech Republic	20.66	1
2nd place, silver medalist(s)	Albert Komański	Poland	20.93	1
3rd place, bronze medalist(s)	Blessing Afrifah	Israel	20.94	1
4	Ondřej Macík	Czech Republic	20.95	2
5	Diego Pettorossi	Italy	20.96	2
6	Jan Jirka	Czech Republic	21.05	2
7	Roko Farkaš	Croatia	21.09	1
8	Joe Ferguson	Great Britain	21.24	1
9	Patryk Wykrota	Poland	21.25	2
10	Filip Federič	Slovakia	21.58	2

Men's 400m
Place	Athlete	Country	Time	Heat
1st place, gold medalist(s)	Vít Müller	Czech Republic	46.26	2
2nd place, silver medalist(s)	Attila Molnár	Hungary	46.28	1
3rd place, bronze medalist(s)	Matěj Krsek	Czech Republic	46.45	1
4	Lionel Spitz	Switzerland	46.57	2
5	Oleksandr Pohorilko	Ukraine	46.67	1
6	Patrik Šorm	Czech Republic	46.68	1
7	Pavel Maslák	Czech Republic	47.01	2
8	Lorenzo Benati	Italy	47.09	2
9	Michal Desenský	Czech Republic	47.35	1
10	Jakub Majerčák	Czech Republic	47.76	2

Men's 1500m
Place	Athlete	Country	Time
1st place, gold medalist(s)	Isaac Nader	Portugal	3:34.23
2nd place, silver medalist(s)	Samuel Pihlström	Sweden	3:35.47
3rd place, bronze medalist(s)	Romain Mornet	France	3:37.22
4	Raphael Pallitsch	Austria	3:37.36
5	Filip Sasínek	Czech Republic	3:37.99
6	Maciej Wyderka	Poland	3:38.49
7	Callum Elson	Great Britain	3:39.55
8	Brian Komen	Kenya	3:40.90
9	Nico Boketta	Czech Republic	3:42.50
10	Marius Probst	Germany	3:48.41
	Adam Czerwiński	Poland	DNF
	Milan Ščibráni	Czech Republic	DNF

Men's Long Jump
Place	Athlete	Country	Mark
1st place, gold medalist(s)	Miltiadis Tentoglou	Greece	8.09 m
2nd place, silver medalist(s)	Radek Juška	Czech Republic	8.03 m
3rd place, bronze medalist(s)	Reece Ademola	Ireland	7.93 m
4	Bozhidar Saraboyukov	Bulgaria	7.83 m
5	Marko Čeko	Croatia	7.82 m
6	Gerson Baldé	Portugal	7.82 m
7	Petr Meindlschmid	Czech Republic	7.61 m
	Jules Pommery	France	NM

Women's 60m
Place	Athlete	Country	Time
1st place, gold medalist(s)	Ewa Swoboda	Poland	7.07
2nd place, silver medalist(s)	Patrizia van der Weken	Luxembourg	7.17
3rd place, bronze medalist(s)	Rani Rosius	Belgium	7.23
4	Viktória Forster	Slovakia	7.26
5	Natálie Kožuškaničová	Czech Republic	7.38
6	Remona Burchell	Jamaica	7.42
7	Nikola Bendová	Czech Republic	7.45
8	Karolína Maňasová	Czech Republic	7.56

Women's Pole Vault
Place	Athlete	Country	Mark
1st place, gold medalist(s)	Tina Šutej	Slovenia	4.73 m
2nd place, silver medalist(s)	Amálie Švábíková	Czech Republic	4.63 m
3rd place, bronze medalist(s)	Roberta Bruni	Italy	4.53 m
4	Angelica Moser	Switzerland	4.53 m
5	Nikola Pöschlová	Czech Republic	4.43 m
6	Hanga Klekner	Hungary	4.33 m
7	Kitty Friele Faye	Norway	4.23 m
8	Buse Arıkazan	Turkey	4.13 m
9	Zuzana Pražáková	Czech Republic	4.13 m
