= 2025 European Athletics Team Championships First Division =

Athletics competition results

Below are the full startlists and, when confirmed, results of the 2025 European Athletics Team Championships First Division on 26–29 June 2025 in Madrid, Spain.

== Overall standings ==
* Host nation (Spain)

Rank	Nation	Points	EW
1	Italy	431.5	3
2	Poland	405.5	2
3	Germany	397	3
4	Netherlands	384.5	8
5	Great Britain	381	2
6	Spain	378	2
7	France	354.5	3
8	Portugal	304	2
9	Sweden	288.5	1
10	Switzerland	286	2
11	Czech Republic	283	3
12	Greece	253	2
13	Hungary	244.5	1
14	Ukraine	231	2
15	Finland	220.5	1
16	Lithuania	178.5	0

: European Athletics Team Champion : silver medalist : bronze medalist : relegated

== Men's events ==
Key: WR= world record - ER = European Record - EL = 2023 European lead - CR = Championships record - NR = National record - NU23R = National Under-23 record

=== 100 metres ===
Place	Heat	Lane	Athlete	Nation	Time	Notes	Points
1	A	6	Eugene Amo-Dadzie	Great Britain	10.07		16
2	A	5	Elvis Afrifa	Netherlands	10.10	PB	15
3	B	5	Oliwer Wdowik	Poland	10.10	PB	14
4	A	9	Henrik Larsson	Sweden	10.11	SB	13
5	A	7	Lucas Ansah-Peprah	Germany	10.15		12
6	B	6	Dominik Illovszky	Hungary	10.25	=PB	11
7	A	8	Jeff Erius	France	10.25	=SB	9.5
7	A	4	Delvis Santos	Portugal	10.25		9.5
9	B	7	Sotirios Gkaragkanis	Greece	10.26	PB	8
10	B	9	Guillem Crespí	Spain	10.26	SB	7
11	A	3	Timothé Mumenthaler	Switzerland	10.30		6
12	B	3	Oleksandr Sokolov	Ukraine	10.32	SB	5
13	B	2	Adam Dambrauskas	Lithuania	10.34	SB	4
14	B	4	Samuli Samuelsson	Finland	10.40		3
15	B	8	Ondřej Macík	Czech Republic	10.43		2
16	A	2	Lorenzo Patta	Italy	14.42		1

=== 200 metres ===
Place	Heat	Lane	Athlete	Nation	Time	Notes	Points
1	A	6	Xavi Mo-Ajok	Netherlands	20.01	CR, EL, PB	16
2	A	5	Fausto Desalu	Italy	20.18	SB	15
3	A	7	Toby Harries	Great Britain	20.25		14
4	B	7	Igor Bogaczyński	Poland	20.37	PB	13
5	B	4	Delvis Santos	Portugal	20.52	PB	12
6	A	8	Tomáš Nĕmejc	Czech Republic	20.55	SB	11
7	A	3	Adrià Alfonso	Spain	20.57	PB	10
8	A	4	Joshua Hartmann	Germany	20.63	SB	9
9	A	2	Théo Schaub	France	20.64	PB	8
10	A	1	Gediminas Truskauskas	Lithuania	20.67	SB	7
11	B	5	Bradley Lestrade	Switzerland	20.81	=SB	6
12	B	3	Samuel Purola	Finland	20.86	SB	5
13	B	8	Balázs Mészáros	Hungary	20.87		4
14	B	6	Vasileios Myrianthopoulos	Greece	20.91		3
15	B	2	Linus Pihl	Sweden	21.19	SB	2
16	B	1	Dmytro Yanchyk	Ukraine	21.35		1

=== 400 metres ===
Place	Heat	Lane	Athlete	Nation	Time	Notes	Points
1	B	6	Samuel Reardon	Great Britain	44.60	CR, PB	16
2	B	7	Oleksandr Pohorilko	Ukraine	44.81	NR	15
3	B	3	Patrik Simon Enyingi	Hungary	44.84	=NR	14
4	A	6	Edoardo Scotti	Italy	44.93	PB	13
5	B	5	Jonas Phijffers	Netherlands	45.13		12
6	B	1	Maksymilian Szwed	Poland	45.18	PB	11
7	B	2	Téo Andant	France	45.21	SB	10
8	A	3	Carl Bengtström	Sweden	45.38	SB	9
9	B	8	George John Franks	Greece	45.46		8
10	A	1	Vincent Gendre	Switzerland	45.65	PB	7
11	A	4	Manuel Bea	Spain	45.89		6
12	A	5	Matěj Krsek	Czech Republic	46.01		5
13	A	7	Omar Elkhatib	Portugal	46.24		4
14	A	2	Konsta Alatupa	Finland	46.32	PB	3
15	A	8	Tomas Keršulis	Lithuania	46.55		2
16	B	4	Jean Paul Bredau	Germany	46.64		1

=== 800 metres ===
Place	Heat	Lane	Athlete	Nation	Time	Notes	Points
1	A	4	Mohamed Attaoui	Spain	1:44.01	CR	16
2	A	3	Francesco Pernici	Italy	1:44.39	PB	15
3	A	2	Corentin Magnou	France	1:45.06		14
4	A	5	Jakub Dudycha	Czech Republic	1:45.29		13
5	A	6	Ivan Pelizza	Switzerland	1:45.44		12
6	A	7	Alexander Stepanov	Germany	1:45.82		11
7	A	1	Samuel Chapple	Netherlands	1:46.09		10
8	A	8	Bartosz Kitliński	Poland	1:46.35		9
9	B	4	Samuel Pihlström	Sweden	1:46.76		8
10	B	5	Tiarnan Crorken	Great Britain	1:46.92		7
11	B	6	David Garcia	Portugal	1:47.96		6
12	B	2	Joonas Rinne	Finland	1:47.99	SB	5
13	B	1	Simas Bertašius	Lithuania	1:48.40	SB	4
14	B	3	Vladyslav Finchuk	Ukraine	1:48.40	SB	3
15	B	8	Charalampos Lagos	Greece	1:48.79		2
16	B	7	Ferenc Soma Kovács	Hungary	1:49.86		1

=== 1500 metres ===
Place	Athlete	Nation	Time	Notes	Points
1	Isaac Nader	Portugal	3:39.08		16
2	Stefan Nillessen	Netherlands	3:39.97		15
3	Filip Rak	Poland	3:40.14		14
4	Adrián Ben	Spain	3:40.31		13
5	Marc Tortell	Germany	3:40.58		12
6	Filip Sasínek	Czech Republic	3:40.87		11
7	Federico Riva	Italy	3:40.89		10
8	Anas Lagtiy Chaoudar	France	3:41.04		9
9	Archie Davis	United Kingdom	3:41.26		8
10	Joonas Rinne	Finland	3:41.97		7
11	Vadim Lonskiy	Ukraine	3:42.76	PB	6
12	Emil Danielsson	Sweden	3:43.72		5
13	Ferenc Soma Kovács	Hungary	3:45.52		4
14	Silas Zurfluh	Switzerland	3:46.08		3
15	Simas Bertašius	Lithuania	3:46.29		2
16	Georgios Matzaridis	Greece	3:49.76		1

=== 5000 metres ===
Place	Athlete	Nation	Time	Notes	Points
1	Niels Laros	Netherlands	13:44.45		16
2	Dominic Lokinyomo Lobalu	Switzerland	13:45.37		15
3	Thierry Ndikumwenayo	Spain	13:45.38		14
4	Frederik Ruppert	Germany	13:47.31	SB	13
5	Yemaneberhan Crippa	Italy	13:48.03	SB	12
6	Bastien Augusto	France	13:51.22		11
7	Kamil Herzyk	Poland	13:51.91	PB	10
8	David Mullarkey	Great Britain	13:53.31		9
9	Jonathan Grahn	Sweden	13:56.03		8
10	Damián Vich	Czech Republic	13:57.11		7
11	Andrii Atamaniuk	Ukraine	13:59.14	SB	6
12	István Szögi	Hungary	14:02.67		5
13	Eemil Helander	Finland	14:07.40		4
14	Rúben Amaral	Portugal	14:19.10		3
15	Giedrius Valinčius	Lithuania	14:23.07		2
16	Konstantinos Stamoulis	Greece	14:26.53		1

=== 110 metres hurdles ===
Place	Heat	Lane	Athlete	Nation	Time	Notes	Points
1	A	6	Jason Joseph	Switzerland	13.24		16
2	A	4	Lorenzo Ndele Simonelli	Italy	13.27	SB	15
3	A	8	Tade Ojora	Great Britain	13.36	SB	14
4	A	5	Enrique Llopis	Spain	13.40		13
5	A	7	Jakub Szymański	Poland	13.41		12
6	A	3	Romain Lecoeur	France	13.44		11
7	A	9	Manuel Mordi	Germany	13.64		10
8	A	2	Timme Koster	Netherlands	13.65		9
9	B	5	Santeri Kuusiniemi	Finland	13.83		8
10	B	7	Dmytro Bahinskyi	Ukraine	13.85		7
11	B	3	Anastasios Iliopoulos	Greece	14.03		6
12	B	6	Edson Gomes	Portugal	14.07		5
13	B	2	Ludvig All	Sweden	14.22	PB	4
14	B	8	Štepán Štefko	Czech Republic	14.24		3
15	B	4	Bálint Szeles	Hungary	14.48		2
16	B	9	Edgaras Benkunskas	Lithuania	14.59	SB	1

=== 400 metres hurdles ===
Place	Heat	Lane	Athlete	Nation	Time	Notes	Points
1	A	6	Vít Müller	Czech Republic	48.46		16
2	A	4	Alastair Chalmers	Great Britain	48.64		15
3	A	3	Julien Bonvin	Switzerland	48.66	SB	14
4	A	5	Alessandro Sibilio	Italy	48.94		13
5	A	7	Jesús David Delgado	Spain	49.06		12
6	A	1	Joshua Abuaku	Germany	49.39		11
7	B	6	Antti Sainio	Finland	49.44	SB	10
8	B	4	Diogo Barrigana	Portugal	49.58	PB	9
9	A	2	Oskar Edlund	Sweden	49.81		8
10	B	5	Csaba Molnár	Hungary	50.12		7
11	B	7	Hugo Menin	France	50.49		6
12	B	8	Rostyslav Holubovych	Ukraine	50.97	PB	5
13	B	2	Paweł Miezianko	Poland	51.17	PB	4
14	B	3	Dimitris Levantinos	Greece	51.24		3
15	B	1	Lukas Šermukšnis	Lithuania	51.96	PB	2
–	A	8	Nick Smidt	Netherlands		DNF	0

=== 3000 metres steeplechase ===
Place	Athlete	Nation	Time	Notes	Points
1	Karl Bebendorf	Germany	8:20.43	CR	16
2	Daniel Arce	Spain	8:22.04		15
3	Nicolas-Marie Daru	France	8:22.39		14
4	Vidar Johansson	Sweden	8:26.14		13
5	Maciej Megier	Poland	8:27.16		12
6	Will Battershill	Great Britain	8:28.19		11
7	István Palkovits	Hungary	8:28.22	SB	10
8	Ala Zoghlami	Italy	8:28.59		9
9	Tomáš Habarta	Czech Republic	8:38.83		8
10	Nick Marsman	Netherlands	8:48.29		7
11	Etson Barros	Portugal	8:50.52		6
12	Aarno Liebl	Switzerland	8:50.73		5
13	Eero Heinonen	Finland	9:03.36		4
14	Nestoras Kolios	Greece	9:12.31		3
15	Roman Rostikus	Ukraine	9:18.37		2
16	Lukas Tarasevičius	Lithuania	9:38.99	SB	1

=== 4 × 100 metres relay ===
Place	Heat	Lane	Country	Athletes	Time	Notes	Points
1	A	4	Netherlands	Nsikak Ekpo, Xavi Mo-Ajok, Taymir Burnet, Elvis Afrifa	37.87	CR, EL, NR	16
2	A	2	Germany	Kevin Kranz, Julian Wagner, Marvin Schulte, Lucas Ansah-Peprah	38.27		15
3	A	8	Great Britain	Romell Glave, Jona Efoloko, Adam Gemili, Eugene Amo-Dadzie	38.33		14
4	A	6	Italy	Filippo Randazzo, Fausto Desalu, Filippo Tortu, Lorenzo Simonelli	38.46		13
5	A	5	Spain	Jorge Hernández, Adria Alfonso, Abel Jordán, Guillem Crespí	38.57	SB	12
6	B	6	Czech Republic	Zdeněk Stromšík, Eduard Kubelík, Tomáš Němejc, Ondřej Macík	38.59	NR	11
7	B	7	Switzerland	Simon Ehammer, Bradley Lestrade, Felix Svensson, Jason Joseph	38.88	SB	10
8	B	3	Greece	Theodoros Vrontinos, Sotirios Gkaragkanis, Nikoloas Panagiotopoulos, Vasileios Myrianthopoulos	38.91	SB	9
9	B	4	Portugal	Carlos Nascimento, Delvis Santos, Gabriel Maia, André Prazeres	39.15		8
10	B	1	Finland	Valtteri Louko, Samuli Samuelsson, Santeri Örn, Samuel Purola	39.24	SB	7
11	B	5	Hungary	Dominik Illovszky, Zalán Deák, Márk Pap, Ábel Takács	39.26	SB	6
12	A	7	Poland	Patryk Krupa, Łukasz Żak, Adrian Brzeziński, Dominik Kopeć	39.29		5
13	A	1	Sweden	Jean-Christian Zirignon, Linus Pihl, Zion Eriksson, Lucas Törnström	39.44	SB	4
14	B	2	Lithuania	Kostas Skrabulis, Tomas Keršulis, Kristupas Seikauskas, Gediminas Truskauskas	39.95		3
–	A	3	France	Ylann Bizasene, Antoine Thoraval, Jeff Erius, Aymeric Priam		DNF	0
–	B	8	Ukraine	Oleksandr Sosnovenko, Dmytro Yanchyk, Oleksandr Sokolov, Illia Popov		DQ	0

=== High jump ===
Place	Group	Athlete	Nation	1.95	2.00	2.05	2.10	2.14	2.18	2.21	2.24	2.27	2.30	2.33	2.36	Result	Notes	Points
1	A	Jan Štefela	Czech Republic	–	–	–	–	o	o	o	o	xo	o	xo	xxx	2.33	PB	16
2	A	Matteo Sioli	Italy	–	–	–	o	o	o	o	o	xxo	xx			2.27		15
3	A	Tobias Potye	Germany	–	–	o	o	o	xo	xo	o	xx				2.24		14
4	A	Antonios Merlos	Greece	–	–	–	o	o	o	o	xxx					2.21	=SB	12.5
4	A	Dmytro Nikitin	Ukraine	–	–	–	o	o	–	o	xx–	x				2.21		12.5
6	B	David González	Spain	o	–	o	o	o	xxo	o	xx					2.21	PB	11
7	B	Kimani Jack	Great Britain	–	–	o	xo	o	xo	xo	x					2.21	PB	10
8	A	Mateusz Kołodziejski	Poland	–	–	o	o	o	o	xxo	xx					2.21		9
9	B	Juozas Baikštys	Lithuania	–	–	o	o	xo	xo	xx						2.18		7.5
9	B	Elijah Pasquier	France	–	o	xo	o	o	xo	xx						2.18		7.5
11	A	Gergely Török	Hungary	–	–	o	o	o	xxx							2.14		6
12	A	Daniel Kosonen	Finland	–	–	xo	o	o	x–	xx						2.14		4.5
12	B	Gerson Baldé	Portugal	–	xo	o	o	o	xxx							2.14	SB	4.5
14	B	Melwin Lycke Holm	Sweden	–	o	o	xo	xo	xx							2.14		3
15	B	Jérôme Hostettler	Switzerland	o	o	o	o	xxx								2.10	=PB	2
16	B	Jin van der Lee	Netherlands	–	o	o	xo	xxx								2.10		1

=== Pole vault ===
Place	Group	Athlete	Nation	4.90	5.10	5.30	5.45	5.60	5.70	5.80	5.85	5.90	5.95	6.00	Result	Notes	Points
1	A	Menno Vloon	Netherlands	–	–	–	–	–	o	xo	–	–	–	xxx	5.80		16
2	A	Piotr Lisek	Poland	–	–	–	o	xo	o	xxx					5.70		15
3	B	Márton Böndör	Hungary	xo	o	o	o	xo	o	xx					5.70	PB	13.5
3	A	Matěj Ščerba	Czech Republic	–	–	o	o	xx–	o	xx					5.70	PB	13.5
5	B	Urho Kujanpää	Finland	–	o	xo	o	xo	xo	x					5.70	=PB	11.5
5	B	Oleksandr Onufriyev	Ukraine	–	o	xo	xo	o	xo	x					5.70	PB	11.5
7	B	Juan Luis Bravo	Spain	–	o	o	xxo	o	r						5.60		10
8	A	Thibaut Collet	France	–	–	–	o	xo	xx–	x					5.60		9
9	B	Owen Heard	Great Britain	o	o	o	xo	xr							5.45		8
10	A	Matteo Oliveri	Italy	–	–	xo	xo	xx							5.45		7
11	A	Valentin Imsand	Switzerland	–	–	xxo	xo	x							5.70		6
12	B	Pedro Buaró	Portugal	–	–	xo	xxx								5.30		5
13	B	Linus Jönsson	Sweden	–	xo	xxx									5.10		3.5
13	B	Nikodemas Laurynas	Lithuania	o	xo	xxx									5.10	=PB	3.5
–	A	Torben Blech	Germany	–	–	–	xxx									NM	0
–	A	Emmanouil Karalis	Greece													DNS	0

=== Long jump ===
Place	Athlete	Nation	#1	#2	#3	#4	#5	#6	Result	Notes	Points
1	Miltiadis Tentoglou	Greece	8.15 (−0.2 m/s)	8.46 (+1.1 m/s)	x	8.44 (+1.8 m/s)	–	–	8.46 (+1.1 m/s)	CR, WL	16
2	Thobias Montler	Sweden	x	7.97 (+1.3 m/s)	7.98 (−0.1 m/s)	8.08 (+1.5 m/s)	r		8.08 (+1.5 m/s)		15
3	Mattia Furlani	Italy	8.03 (+1.0 m/s)	8.07 (−0.3 m/s)	4.95 (−0.8 m/s)	x	x	x	8.07 (−0.3 m/s)		14
4	Piotr Tarkowski	Poland	8.02 (+0.9 m/s)	7.97 (−0.1 m/s)	8.03 (+0.1 m/s)	7.88 (−0.2 m/s)	x	x	8.03 (+0.1 m/s)	=PB	13
5	Julien Pauthonnier	France	7.97 (+1.0 m/s)	7.86 (+0.5 m/s)	7.83 (+0.3 m/s)	7.80 (+2.2 m/s)	x		7.97 (+1.0 m/s)		12
6	Simon Batz	Germany	7.90 (+1.3 m/s)	7.92 (−0.5 m/s)	7.81 (−0.1 m/s)	x	x		7.92 (−0.5 m/s)		11
7	Simon Ehammer	Switzerland	x	x	7.87 (+0.3 m/s)	7.89 (+1.6 m/s)	x		7.89 (+1.6 m/s)		10
8	Petr Meindlschmid	Czech Republic	7.70 (+2.4 m/s)	x	7.82 (+0.1 m/s)	x	x		7.82 (+0.1 m/s)	SB	9
9	Lester Lescay	Spain	x	x	7.80 (+0.3 m/s)				7.80 (+0.3 m/s)		8
10	Kalle Salminen	Finland	7.65 (+0.5 m/s)	7.69 (+0.6 m/s)	7.73 (+1.7 m/s)				7.73 (+1.7 m/s)		7
11	Samuel Khogali	Great Britain	x	x	7.69 (−0.4 m/s)				7.69 (−0.4 m/s)		6
12	Danylo Dubyna	Ukraine	7.62 (+1.9 m/s)	7.62 (+1.0 m/s)	7.62 (+1.0 m/s)				7.62 (+1.0 m/s)		5
13	Gerson Baldé	Portugal	x	x	7.59 (+1.1 m/s)				7.59 (+1.1 m/s)		4
14	Mátyás Németh	Hungary	5.70 (+2.0 m/s)	7.49 (−0.1 m/s)	x				7.49 (−0.1 m/s)	SB	3
15	Algirdas Strelčiūnas	Lithuania	x	7.36 (+0.4 m/s)	x				7.36 (+0.4 m/s)		2
—	Justin Sluijter	Netherlands	x	x	x				NM		0

=== Triple jump ===
Place	Athlete	Nation	#1	#2	#3	#4	#5	#6	Result	Notes	Points
1	Jonathan Seremes	France	16.02 (+0.8 m/s)	16.83 (+1.0 m/s)	16.38 (+0.1 m/s)	16.74 (+0.4 m/s)	16.79 (−0.1 m/s)	17.00 (−0.1 m/s)	17.00 (−0.1 m/s)		16
2	Simone Biasutti	Italy	16.70 (+0.9 m/s)	16.94 (+0.6 m/s)	–	–	–	–	16.94 (+0.6 m/s)	PB	15
3	Vladyslav Shepeliev	Ukraine	16.83 (+1.8 m/s)	x	16.29 (+1.0 m/s)	–	16.51 (±0.0 m/s)	x	16.83 (+1.8 m/s)	PB	14
4	Marcos Ruiz	Spain	x	16.15 (+0.8 m/s)	13.40 (+0.1 m/s)	–	–	x	16.15 (+0.8 m/s)		13
5	Dániel Szenderffy	Hungary	15.87 (+1.9 m/s)	15.63 (+0.4 m/s)	16.00 (+0.3 m/s)	15.96 (±0.0 m/s)	x		16.00 (+0.3 m/s)		12
6	Tiago Pereira	Portugal	15.84 (+1.3 m/s)	15.97 (+0.8 m/s)	–	r			15.97 (+0.8 m/s)		11
7	Fabian Biondina	Netherlands	15.27 (+0.5 m/s)	15.91 (+0.7 m/s)	x	15.78 (+0.2 m/s)	x		15.91 (+0.7 m/s)	PB	10
8	Aaro Davidila	Finland	x	15.74 (+1.7 m/s)	15.90 (+1.4 m/s)	x	x		15.90 (+1.4 m/s)		9
9	Wojciech Galik	Poland	15.79 (+1.0 m/s)	x	15.68 (+0.5 m/s)				15.79 (+1.0 m/s)		8
10	Andreas Pantazis	Greece	15.62 (+0.7 m/s)	x	x				15.62 (+0.7 m/s)		7
11	Efe Uwaifo	Great Britain	x	15.58 (+1.1 m/s)	x				15.58 (+1.1 m/s)		6
12	Pavel Halátek	Czech Republic	x	x	15.39 (+0.4 m/s)				15.39 (+0.4 m/s)		5
13	Marius Vadeikis	Lithuania	15.26 (+1.6 m/s)	15.30 (+0.4 m/s)	15.22 (+0.7 m/s)				15.30 (+0.4 m/s)		4
14	Silvan Ryser	Switzerland	14.94 (+0.5 m/s)	14.93 (+0.9 m/s)	x				14.94 (+0.5 m/s)		3
15	Melwin Lycke Holm	Sweden	14.84 (+2.0 m/s)	14.91 (+1.2 m/s)	x				14.91 (+1.2 m/s)	PB	2
16	Pascal Boden	Germany	x	x	14.59 (+0.6 m/s)				14.59 (+0.6 m/s)		1

=== Shot put ===
Place	Athlete	Nation	#1	#2	#3	#4	#5	#6	Result	Notes	Points
1	Leonardo Fabbri	Italy	20.88	21.49	21.21	x	21.19	21.68	21.68		16
2	Wictor Petersson	Sweden	x	x	19.76	19.77	21.10	x	21.10		15
3	Konrad Bukowiecki	Poland	19.60	20.01	20.55	19.90	20.36	x	20.55		14
4	Scott Lincoln	Great Britain	x	19.89	19.99	20.40	x	20.41	20.41		13
5	Artem Levchenko	Ukraine	x	19.22	x	19.54	20.36		20.36	PB	12
6	Tsanko Arnaudov	Portugal	19.52	x	x	19.30	19.44		19.52		11
7	Silas Ristl	Germany	19.15	18.48	x	19.40	19.42		19.42		10
8	Yannick Rolvink	Netherlands	18.10	18.45	19.34	x	17.95		19.34	PB	9
9	Franck Elemba	France	18.91	x	18.39				18.91		8
10	Tadeáš Procházka	Czech Republic	18.88	18.28	x				18.88		7
11	Stefan Wieland	Switzerland	17.87	18.71	18.84				18.84		6
12	Konstantinos Gennikis	Greece	18.27	x	18.81				18.81		5
13	José Angel Pinedo	Spain	18.34	x	x				18.34		4
14	István Fekete	Hungary	17.18	18.17	17.74				18.17		3
15	Simonas Bakanas	Lithuania	16.90	17.87	x				17.87	PB	2
16	Nico Oksanen	Finland	x	16.66	x				16.66		1

=== Discus throw ===
Place	Athlete	Nation	#1	#2	#3	#4	#5	#6	Result	Notes	Points
1	Daniel Ståhl	Sweden	66.32	x	68.36	67.72	x	66.17	68.36		16
2	Mika Sosna	Germany	66.17	64.14	63.37	64.31	64.29	63.68	66.17		15
3	Lawrence Okoye	Great Britain	65.83	65.02	63.41	x	63.40	64.89	65.83		14
4	Diego Casas	Spain	61.84	62.35	62.91	64.32	64.77	62.55	64.77		13
5	Andrius Gudžius	Lithuania	59.40	63.60	x	64.63	64.44		64.63		12
6	Ruben Rolvink	Netherlands	63.73	60.19	63.78	x	x		63.78		11
7	Oskar Stachnik	Poland	60.13	61.88	60.72	60.09	59.73		61.88		10
8	Lolassonn Djouhan	France	58.18	59.83	x	57.50	58.63		59.83		9
9	Dimitrios Pavlidis	Greece	58.27	x	59.78				59.78		8
10	Mykhailo Brudin	Ukraine	59.41	59.30	x				59.41	SB	7
11	Emanuel Sousa	Portugal	59.23	58.56	58.23				59.23		6
12	Enrico Saccomano	Italy	57.99	57.54	58.66				58.66		5
13	Jakub Forejt	Czech Republic	57.08	57.43	57.30				57.43		4
14	Gian Vetterli	Switzerland	51.82	57.42	57.19				57.42		3
15	Mico Lampinen	Finland	56.67	x	55.82				56.67		2
–	János Huszák	Hungary	x	x	x					NM	0

=== Hammer throw ===
Place	Athlete	Nation	#1	#2	#3	#4	#5	#6	Result	Notes	Points
1	Mykhaylo Kokhan	Ukraine	76.60	x	77.45	81.66	x	79.25	81.66	PB	16
2	Merlin Hummel	Germany	x	77.35	79.63	x	81.27	x	81.27	PB	15
3	Bence Halász	Hungary	80.18	77.86	73.77	80.63	80.39	77.97	80.63		14
4	Yann Chaussinand	France	78.45	x	78.26	x	71.29	71.90	78.45		13
5	Volodymyr Myslyvčuk	Czech Republic	75.13	x	x	75.38	x		75.38		12
6	Giorgio Olivieri	Italy	72.90	72.53	72.02	72.13	70.53		72.90		11
7	Décio Andrade	Portugal	69.08	68.84	72.35	69.91	70.69		72.35	SB	10
8	Denzel Comenentia	Netherlands	71.79	70.74	70.19	71.70	x		71.79		9
9	Ragnar Carlsson	Sweden	69.91	69.29	70.80				70.80		8
10	Lars Wolfisberg	Switzerland	64.79	68.50	70.54				70.54		7
11	Ioannis Korakidis	Greece	70.53	69.99	x				70.53		6
12	Kevin Arreaga	Spain	65.69	69.19	68.77				69.19		5
13	Jake Norris	Great Britain	x	x	69.19				69.19		4
14	Aaron Kangas	Finland	66.84	69.06	68.37				69.06		3
15	Tomas Vasiliauskas	Lithuania	64.03	64.68	62.80				64.68		2
–	Paweł Fajdek	Poland	x	x	x					NM	0

=== Javelin throw ===
Place	Athlete	Nation	#1	#2	#3	#4	#5	#6	Result	Notes	Points
1	Julian Weber	Germany	85.15	84.69	74.14	–	–	–	85.15		16
2	Artur Felfner	Ukraine	66.80	64.34	75.39	75.26	80.54	x	80.54	SB	15
3	Edis Matusevičius	Lithuania	74.76	x	78.26	x	x	x	78.26	SB	14
4	Leandro Ramos	Portugal	74.76	77.08	78.12	x	76.30	74.47	78.12		13
5	Marcin Krukowski	Poland	70.19	75.26	x	77.39	77.50		77.50		12
6	Manu Quijera	Spain	70.52	77.26	75.68	76.97	75.32		77.26		11
7	Daniel Bainbridge	Great Britain	72.34	73.12	x	69.54	x		73.12		10
8	Topias Laine	Finland	70.56	68.58	73.04	66.81	70.59		73.04		9
9	Roberto Orlando	Italy	72.75	69.81	70.04				72.75		8
10	Dimitrios Tsitsos	Greece	71.41	71.73	70.57				71.73		7
11	Martin Konečný	Czech Republic	71.70	71.23	68.39				71.70		6
12	Franck di Sanza	Switzerland	71.25	x	69.45				71.25		5
13	Ryan Jansen	Netherlands	62.06	70.82	x				70.82		4
14	Noel Kovács	Hungary	66.54	68.38	63.17				68.38		3
15	Remi Rougetet	France	67.68	67.63	63.77				67.68		2
16	Jakob Rahm	Sweden	66.56	60.53	64.70				66.56		1

== Women's events ==
=== 100 metres ===
Place	Heat	Lane	Athlete	Nation	Time	Notes	Points
1	A	6	Boglárka Takács	Hungary	11.06	CR, NR	16
2	A	3	Ewa Swoboda	Poland	11.13	SB	15
3	B	6	Minke Bisschops	Netherlands	11.17	PB	14
4	A	5	Lorène Bazolo	Portugal	11.21		13
5	A	9	Zaynab Dosso	Italy	11.22	SB	12
6	A	4	Lisa Mayer	Germany	11.26		11
7	B	4	Polyniki Emmanouilidou	Greece	11.26	SB	10
8	A	2	Salomé Kora	Switzerland	11.27		9
9	A	8	Julia Henriksson	Sweden	11.27		8
10	A	7	María Isabel Pérez	Spain	11.31		7
11	B	7	Aleeya Sibbons	Great Britain	11.37		6
12	B	5	Sarah Richard	France	11.43		5
13	B	3	Pavla Kvasničková	Czech Republic	11.65		4
14	B	9	Ema Rupšytė	Lithuania	11.65		3
15	B	8	Diana Honcharenko	Ukraine	11.72		2
16	B	2	Aino Pulkkinen	Finland	11.77	PB	1

=== 200 metres ===
Place	Heat	Lane	Athlete	Nation	Time	Notes	Points
1	A	8	Jaël Bestué	Spain	22.19	CR, EL, NR	16
2	A	3	Helene Parisot	France	22.42	PB	15
3	A	5	Sophia Junk	Germany	22.53	PB	14
4	A	4	Lieke Klaver	Netherlands	22.59	SB	13
5	A	6	Lorène Bazolo	Portugal	22.61	NR	12
6	B	5	Boglárka Takács	Hungary	22.65	NR	11
7	B	7	Dalia Kaddari	Italy	22.68	SB	10
8	A	7	Julia Henriksson	Sweden	22.74	SB	9
9	B	3	Léonie Pointet	Switzerland	22.82	SB	8
10	A	2	Rachel Bennett	United Kingdom	22.87	PB	7
11	B	8	Polyniki Emmanouilidou	Greece	22.97	SB	6
12	B	6	Magdalena Niemczyk	Poland	23.04	PB	5
13	B	2	Lukrecija Sabaityté	Lithuania	23.11	PB	4
14	A	1	Terezie Táborská	Czech Republic	23.37		3
15	B	4	Tetiana Kaysen	Ukraine	23.59		2
16	B	1	Aino Pulkkinen	Finland	23.95		1

=== 400 metres ===
Place	Heat	Lane	Athlete	Nation	Time	Notes	Points
1	A	6	Femke Bol	Netherlands	49.48	CR, EL	16
2	A	7	Natalia Bukowiecka	Poland	50.14	SB	15
3	A	4	Paula Sevilla	Spain	50.70	PB	14
4	A	5	Anna Polinari	Italy	50.76	PB	13
5	A	3	Emily Newnham	Great Britain	50.84	PB	12
6	B	7	Mette Baas	Finland	51.47	PB	11
7	A	2	Johanna Martin	Germany	51.55	PB	10
8	A	8	Lada Vondrová	Czech Republic	51.68		9
9	A	1	Amandine Brossier	France	52.08		8
10	B	6	Catia Gubelmann	Switzerland	52.15		7
11	B	5	Elna Wester	Sweden	52.32	PB	6
12	B	8	Carina Vanessa	Portugal	52.62	PB	5
13	B	3	Modesta Justė Morauskaitė	Lithuania	52.76	SB	4
14	B	4	Zita Szentgyörgyi	Hungary	53.74		3
15	B	2	Alina Yaroshyna	Ukraine	54.19		2
16	B	1	Alexia Papavasileiou	Greece	54.34		1

=== 800 metres ===
Place	Heat	Lane	Athlete	Nation	Time	Notes	Points
1	A	7	Anaïs Bourgoin	France	1:58.60	CR	16
2	A	5	Audrey Werro	Switzerland	1:58.78		15
3	A	4	Eloisa Coiro	Italy	1:59.88		14
4	A	2	Gabija Galvydytė	Lithuania	1:59.96	SB	13
5	A	6	Anna Wielgosz	Poland	2:00.10		12
6	A	3	Abigail Ives	Great Britain	2:00.48		11
7	A	8	Smilla Kolbe	Germany	2:00.91		10
8	B	2	Salomé Afonso	Portugal	2:02.12	SB	9
9	B	4	Georgia-Maria Despollari	Greece	2:02.15	SB	8
10	A	1	Lorea Ibarzabal	Spain	2:02.41		7
11	B	6	Pavla Štoudková	Czech Republic	2:02.43		6
12	B	5	Veera Mattila	Finland	2:02.59		5
13	B	3	Yolanda Ngarambe	Sweden	2:03.44	SB	4
14	B	8	Yuliya Havryliak	Ukraine	2:04.75	PB	3
15	B	7	Eveline Saalberg	Netherlands	2:05.76		2
16	B	1	Hanga Klekner	Hungary	2:31.96	PB	1

=== 1500 metres ===
Place	Athlete	Nation	Time	Notes	Points
1	Agathe Guillemot	France	4:08.72		16
2	Salomé Afonso	Portugal	4:09.01		15
3	Revee Walcott-Nolan	Great Britain	4:09.16		14
4	Klaudia Kazimierska	Poland	4:09.70		13
5	Gabija Galvydytė	Lithuania	4:10.21		12
6	Marta Zenoni	Italy	4:10.23		11
7	Águeda Marqués	Spain	4:10.62		10
8	Joceline Wind	Switzerland	4:10.83		9
9	Maureen Koster	Netherlands	4:11.07		8
10	Vera Sjöberg	Sweden	4:11.32		7
11	Majtie Kolberg	Germany	4:11.41	PB	6
12	Koraini Kyriakopoulou	Greece	4:12.71	PB	5
13	Kristiina Sasínek Mäki	Czech Republic	4:20.19		4
14	Siiri Rainio	Finland	4:20.52		3
15	Nataliia Krol	Ukraine	4:22.10	SB	2
16	Gréta Varga	Hungary	4:23.92		1

=== 5000 metres ===
Place	Athlete	Nation	Time	Notes	Points
1	Nadia Battocletti	Italy	15:56.01		16
2	Marta García	Spain	15:58.53		15
3	Diane van Es	Netherlands	15:59.41		14
4	Sarah Lahti	Sweden	16:03.45		13
5	Calli Hauger-Thackery	Great Britain	16:06.33		12
6	Elena Burkard	Germany	16:10.06		11
7	Melissa Chelena Anastasakis	Greece	16:21.01	PB	10
8	Weronika Lizakowska	Poland	16:22.52	SB	9
9	Diana Mezuliáníková	Czech Republic	16:24.20		8
10	Susanna Saapunki	Finland	16:24.71		7
11	Alessia Zarbo	France	16:27.72		6
12	Mariia Mazurenko	Ukraine	16:31.11		5
13	Agnès McTighe	Switzerland	16:38.38		4
14	Ana Marinho	Portugal	16:53.74		3
15	Vaida Žūsinaitė-Nekriošienė	Lithuania	17:04.70		2
16	Gabriella K. Szabó	Hungary	17:10.23		1

=== 100 metres hurdles ===
Place	Heat	Lane	Athlete	Nation	Time	Notes	Points
1	A	6	Ditaji Kambundji	Switzerland	12.39		16
2	A	4	Nadine Visser	Netherlands	12.39		15
3	A	7	Pia Skrzyszowska	Poland	12.60		14
4	A	5	Giada Carmassi	Italy	12.62		13
5	A	2	Luca Kozák	Hungary	12.80		12
6	A	3	Nooralotta Neziri	Finland	12.90		11
7	A	8	Sacha Alessandrini	France	12.91		10
8	B	4	Xènia Benach	Spain	12.94	PB	9
9	B	5	Helena Jiranová	Czech Republic	13.06	PB	8
10	B	2	Sofia Iosifidou	Greece	13.08	PB	7
11	B	3	Melissa Sereno	Portugal	13.18	PB	6
12	A	9	Ricarda Lobe	Germany	13.20		5
13	B	8	Beatričė Juškevičiūtė	Lithuania	13.26	SB	4
14	B	6	Maja Maunsbach	Sweden	13.29		3
15	B	7	Iryna Budzynska	Ukraine	13.38		2
16	B	9	Alicia Barrett	Great Britain	13.43		1

=== 400 metres hurdles ===
Place	Heat	Lane	Athlete	Nation	Time	Notes	Points
1	A	4	Fatoumata Binta Diallo	Portugal	54.77	SB	16
2	A	5	Ayomide Folorunso	Italy	54.88		15
3	A	6	Lina Nielsen	Great Britain	54.90		14
4	A	7	Elena Kelety	Germany	54.91		13
5	A	8	Lena Wernli	Switzerland	55.19	PB	12
6	B	7	Sára Mátó	Hungary	55.37	SB	11
7	A	2	Kristiina Halonen	Finland	55.62		10
8	A	1	Moa Granat	Sweden	55.75		9
9	B	4	Anna Gryc	Poland	56.27		8
10	B	8	Nina Franke	Netherlands	56.30	PB	7
11	B	6	Emma Montoya	France	56.99		6
12	B	3	Tetyana Melnyk	Ukraine	57.22	PB	5
13	B	5	Zuzana Cymbálová	Czech Republic	57.61		4
14	B	2	Laoura Zenegia	Greece	57.82	SB	3
15	A	3	Daniela Fra	Spain	58.27		2
16	B	1	Ema Sarafinaitė	Lithuania	1:03.22	SB	1

=== 3000 metres steeplechase ===
Place	Athlete	Nation	Time	Notes	Points
1	Ilona Mononen	Finland	9:49.21		16
2	Sarah Tait	Great Britain	9:49.24		15
3	Kinga Królik	Poland	9:49.80		14
4	Marta Serrano	Spain	9:50.08		13
5	Flavie Renouard	France	9:50.83		12
6	Laura Taborda	Portugal	9:53.34		11
7	Veerle Bakker	Netherlands	9:55.81		10
8	Chiara Scherrer	Switzerland	9:56.81	SB	9
9	Vasiliki Kallimogianni	Greece	10:00.57		8
10	Zita Urbán	Hungary	10:03.84		7
11	Adia Budde	Germany	10:08.90		6
12	Ebba Cronholm	Sweden	10:13.26		5
13	Gaia Colli	Italy	10:16.79		4
14	Auksė Linkutė	Lithuania	10:25.21		3
15	Victoria Dutkevich	Ukraine	10:26.13	PB	2
16	Anna Málková	Czech Republic	10:40.91		1

=== 4 × 100 metres relay ===
Place	Heat	Lane	Country	Athletes	Time	Notes	Points
1	A	7	Netherlands	Nadine Visser, Lieke Klaver, Minke Bisschops, Marije van Hunenstijn	42.02	CR, EL, NR	16
2	A	4	Spain	Esperança Cladera, Jaël Bestué, Paula Sevilla, María Isabel Pérez	42.11	NR	15
3	A	2	Germany	Lisa Marie Kwayie, Sina Mayer, Sophia Junk, Lisa Mayer	42.52	SB	14
4	A	6	Italy	Vittoria Fontana, Gloria Hooper, Dalia Kaddari, Zaynab Dosso	42.58	SB	13
5	A	5	Poland	Magdalena Stefanowicz, Magdalena Niemczyk, Krystsina Tsimanouskaya, Ewa Swoboda	42.84	SB	12
6	A	8	France	Carolle Zahi, Sarah Richard, Hélène Parisot, Lucie Jean Charles	42.86	SB	11
7	A	1	Switzerland	Géraldine Frey, Céline Bürgi, Léonie Pointet, Salomé Kora	42.87	SB	10
8	A	3	Great Britain	Alicia Barrett, Rachel Bennett, Desiree Henry, Aleeya Sibbons	43.00		9
9	B	3	Greece	Sofia Kamperidou, Rafailia Spanoudaki-Chatziriga, Dimitra Tsoukala, Polyniki Emmanouilidou	43.26	SB	8
10	B	5	Hungary	Jusztina Csóti, Alexa Sulyán, Boglárka Takács, Anna Luca Kocsis	43.33	NR	7
11	B	6	Portugal	Lorène Bazolo, Beatriz Castelhano, Beatriz Andrade, Arialis Gandulla	43.44	NR	6
12	B	4	Czech Republic	Pavla Kvasničková, Terezie Táborská, Silvia Daněčková, Johanka Šafářová	43.65	SB	5
13	B	7	Sweden	Julia Henriksson, Nikki Anderberg, Wilma Svenson, Jamilia Bernhardsson	44.22	SB	4
14	B	2	Finland	Aino Pulkkinen, Anna Pursiainen, Emma Tainio, Nooralotta Neziri	44.48	SB	3
15	B	8	Ukraine	Anna Karandukova, Diana Honcharenko, Tetiana Kaysen, Danyila Khavan	44.52	SB	2
16	B	1	Lithuania	Andrė Ožechauskaitė, Ema Rupšytė, Akvilė Jonauskytė, Lukrecija Sabaitytė	44.81	SB	1

=== High jump ===
Place	Group	Athlete	Nation	1.70	1.75	1.80	1.84	1.88	1.91	1.94	1.97	2.00	2.03	Result	Notes	Points
1	A	Yaroslava Mahuchikh	Ukraine	–	–	–	–	–	o	o	xxo	o	xxx	2.00		16
2	A	Maria Żodzik	Poland	–	–	o	o	o	o	o	xxo	xx		1.97		15
3	A	Imke Onnen	Germany	–	–	–	o	o	xo	o	xxx			1.94		14
4	A	Michaela Hrubá	Czech Republic	–	–	o	o	o	o	xxx				1.91		12.5
4	B	Idea Pieroni	Italy	–	o	o	o	o	o	xxx				1.91		12.5
6	A	Britt Weerman	Netherlands	–	–	o	o	o	xxo	xx				1.91	SB	11
7	A	Tatiana Gusin	Greece	–	–	o	o	o	xxx					1.88		10
8	B	Ona Bonet	Spain	o	o	xo	xo	xo	x					1.88	=PB	9
9	B	Solène Gicquel	France	–	o	o	o	xxo	xx					1.88	=SB	8
10	B	Urtė Baikštytė	Lithuania	–	o	o	o	xxx						1.84	=SB	7
11	A	Engla Nilsson	Sweden	–	–	o	xo	xxx						1.84		6
12	A	Lilianna Bátori	Hungary	–	o	o	xxx							1.80		5
13	B	Heta Tuuri	Finland	o	o	xo	xxx							1.80		4
14	B	Céline Weber	Switzerland	o	o	xxx								1.75		3
15	B	Natacha Candé	Portugal	xo	o	xxx								1.75		2
16	B	Emily Borthwick	Great Britain	o	xxx									1.70		1

=== Pole vault ===
Place	Group	Athlete	Nation	3.60	3.80	4.00	4.15	4.30	4.45	4.55	4.65	4.70	4.75	4.80	Result	Notes	Points
1	A	Amálie Švábíková	Czech Republic	–	–	–	–	xo	–	o	xo	x–	xx		4.65		16
2	A	Maryna Kylypko	Ukraine	–	–	–	o	o	o	xxo	xo	x			4.65	SB	15
3	A	Angelica Moser	Switzerland	–	–	–	–	xo	xo	xo	x				4.55		14
4	A	Elisa Molinarolo	Italy	–	–	–	o	o	o	xxx					4.45		13
5	B	Gemma Tutton	Great Britain	–	–	o	xo	xxo	o	x					4.45	PB	12
6	A	Elise de Jong	Netherlands	–	–	–	o	o	xxx						4.30		10.5
6	B	Ariadni Adamopoulou	Greece	–	–	–	o	o	xxx						4.30		10.5
8	A	Hanga Klekner	Hungary	–	–	–	xxo	o	xx						4.30		9
9	B	Sandra Alvero	Sweden	o	xo	xo	xo	o	x						4.30		8
10	B	Monica Clemente	Spain	–	o	o	o	xo	xxx						4.30	SB	7
11	A	Saga Andersson	Finland	–	–	–	o	xxo	xx						4.30		4.5
11	A	Marie-Julie Bonnin	France	–	–	–	–	xxo	xx						4.30		4.5
11	B	Rugilė Miklyčiūtė	Lithuania	–	o	o	o	xxo	xx						4.30	NR	4.5
11	B	Zofia Gaborska	Poland	–	–	o	o	xxo	xx						4.30	PB	4.5
15	B	Friedelinde Petershofen	Germany	–	–	o	xxo	xxx							4.15		2
–	B	Cátia Pereira	Portugal													DNS	0

=== Long jump ===
Place	Athlete	Nation	#1	#2	#3	#4	#5	#6	Result	Notes	Points
1	Larissa Iapichino	Italy	6.49	x	6.63	6.64	6.92	6.72	6.92		16
2	Malaika Mihambo	Germany	x	6.84	6.76	x	x	x	6.84		15
3	Agate de Sousa	Portugal	x	6.67	x	6.66	6.84	x	6.84	SB	14
4	Annik Kälin	Switzerland	6.62	x	6.78	6.40	6.69	6.58	6.78		13
5	Hilary Kpatcha	France	6.64	6.66	x	6.60	6.76		6.76		12
6	Jazmin Sawyers	Great Britain	x	6.43	6.75	6.60	x		6.75		11
7	Pauline Hondema	Netherlands	6.70	6.58	6.36	x	6.54		6.70		10
8	Fátima Diame	Spain	x	6.05	6.68	x	x		6.68		9
9	Anna Matuszewicz	Poland	6.18	6.21	6.40				6.40		8
10	Petra Bánhidi-Farkas	Hungary	6.32	6.30	6.39				6.39		7
11	Khaddi Sagnia	Sweden	x	6.33	x				6.33		6
12	Jogailė Petrokaitė	Lithuania	6.20	4.74	r				6.20		5
13	Natalia Besi	Greece	6.18	x	6.18				6.18		4
14	Daniela Volná	Czech Republic	5.84	5.72	6.16				6.16		3
15	Jessica Kähärä	Finland	x	6.15	x				6.15		2
16	Alina Listunova	Ukraine	5.91	6.05	6.00				6.00		1

=== Triple jump ===
Place	Athlete	Nation	#1	#2	#3	#4	#5	#6	Result	Notes	Points
1	Caroline Joyeux	Germany	x	14.17	13.35	x	x	14.42	14.42		16
2	Maja Åskag	Sweden	x	13.99	12.30	x	13.99	14.18	14.18	SB	15
3	Erika Saraceni	Italy	13.20	13.64	x	x	13.99	14.08	14.08	PB	14
4	Oxana Koreneva	Greece	x	13.86	13.93	13.78	x	13.41	13.93		13
5	Ilionis Guillaume	France	x	13.19	13.32	13.83	13.90		13.90		12
6	Linda Suchá	Czech Republic	13.37	x	x	13.60	13.85		13.85		11
7	Adrianna Laskowska	Poland	x	13.76	x	x	x		13.76		10
8	Dovilė Kilty	Lithuania	13.29	x	x	x	13.46		13.46		9
9	Lucinda Gomes	Portugal	12.68	12.76	13.26				13.26		8
10	Georgina Forde-Wells	Great Britain	x	13.26	12.57				13.26		7
11	Viktoriia Baranivska	Ukraine	13.24	x	13.21				13.24		6
12	Kellynsia Leerdam	Netherlands	x	12.94	13.01				13.01		5
13	Erna Virók	Hungary	12.83	12.40	12.86				12.86		4
14	María González	Spain	x	x	12.85				12.85		3
15	Hanna Ferber	Switzerland	12.62	12.60	12.28				12.62		2
–	Senni Salminen	Finland	x	x	x					NM	0

=== Shot put ===
Place	Athlete	Nation	#1	#2	#3	#4	#5	#6	Result	Notes	Points
1	Jessica Schilder	Netherlands	18.63	x	x	19.02	20.14	19.54	20.14	CR	16
2	Yemisi Ogunleye	Germany	18.77	18.55	x	18.80	19.58	x	19.58		15
3	Fanny Roos	Sweden	19.08	x	18.10	18.94	19.38	19.01	19.38		14
4	Jessica Inchude	Portugal	18.74	18.13	18.58	18.84	x	x	18.84		13
5	María Belén Toimil	Spain	17.46	x	17.46	17.39	17.61		17.61	SB	12
6	Miryam Mazenauer	Switzerland	16.37	x	16.86	x	17.31		17.31		11
7	Serena Vincent	Great Britain	16.68	17.11	16.79	15.27	16.65		17.11		10
8	Eveliina Rouvali	Finland	16.84	x	x	x	16.53		16.84		9
9	Ol'ha Holodna	Ukraine	16.29	16.67	16.67				16.67		8
10	Klaudia Kardasz	Poland	16.67	16.58	15.92				16.67		7
11	Renáta Beregszászi	Hungary	16.45	x	x				16.45		6
12	Martina Mazurová	Czech Republic	15.83	15.63	15.78				15.83		5
13	Amanda Ngandu-Ntumba	France	15.48	x	x				15.48		4
14	Maria Rafailidou	Greece	x	15.16	x				15.16		3
15	Sara Verteramo	Italy	x	15.02	14.52				15.02		2
16	Ieva Gumbs	Lithuania	14.77	14.79	–				14.79		1

=== Discus throw ===
Place	Athlete	Nation	#1	#2	#3	#4	#5	#6	Result	Notes	Points
1	Jorinde van Klinken	Netherlands	64.61	63.69	63.86	63.65	x	x	64.61		16
2	Shanice Craft	Germany	58.06	58.06	60.42	58.02	–	61.53	61.53		15
3	Liliana Cá	Portugal	x	60.49	59.87	59.68	x	x	60.49		14
4	Mélina Robert-Michon	France	60.06	x	59.88	x	58.84	59.03	60.06		13
5	Daria Zabawska	Poland	55.04	57.98	58.32	58.66	58.14		58.66		12
6	Ieva Gumbs	Lithuania	57.94	58.13	57.46	58.47	x		58.47		11
7	Vanessa Kamga	Sweden	57.04	56.57	55.53	x	x		57.04		10
8	Chrysoula Anagnostopoulou	Greece	55.45	55.68	54.69	55.21	55.85		55.85		9
9	Barbora Tichá	Czech Republic	53.88	55.57	53.60				55.57	SB	8
10	Ines Lopez	Spain	x	55.12	54.35				55.12		7
11	Daisy Osakue	Italy	52.38	x	54.86				54.86		6
12	Helena Leveelahti	Finland	44.36	54.52	52.58				54.52		5
13	Dóra Kerekes	Hungary	51.27	x	53.95				53.95	SB	4
14	Zara Obamakinwa	Great Britain	x	x	52.08				52.08		3
15	Nataliya Semenova	Ukraine	49.77	x	51.07				51.07		2
16	Giada Borin	Switzerland	43.44	48.58	x				48.58		1

=== Hammer throw ===
Place	Athlete	Nation	#1	#2	#3	#4	#5	#6	Result	Notes	Points
1	Anita Włodarczyk	Poland	x	70.04	70.55	73.34	73.09	72.14	73.34	SB	16
2	Silja Kosonen	Finland	72.58	71.48	70.57	72.64	73.09	71.20	73.09		15
3	Anna Purchase	Great Britain	x	x	71.41	x	x	x	71.41		14
4	Sara Fantini	Italy	70.22	x	68.29	69.95	x	70.56	70.56		13
5	Aileen Kuhn	Germany	67.76	65.09	69.98	68.81	65.51		69.98		12
6	Stamatia Alexandra Scarvelis	Greece	66.51	67.32	63.51	68.01	67.93		68.01		11
7	Laura Redondo	Spain	64.43	65.93	64.57	63.74	64.96		65.93		10
8	Mariana Pestana	Portugal	62.71	64.79	60.78	x	x		64.79		9
9	Zsanett Németh	Hungary	x	x	64.33				64.33		8
10	Rebecka Hallerth	Sweden	61.78	62.77	64.02				64.02		7
11	Lotte Smink	Netherlands	61.14	60.92	63.94				63.94		6
12	Iryna Klymets	Ukraine	x	x	62.70				62.70		5
13	Rose Loga	France	x	x	60.54				60.54		4
14	Tereza Holcová	Czech Republic	x	59.81	55.05				59.81		3
15	Iris Nowack	Switzerland	56.46	57.30	56.21				57.30		2
16	Radha Kučinskaitė	Lithuania	34.36	x	x				34.36		1

=== Javelin throw ===
Place	Athlete	Nation	#1	#2	#3	#4	#5	#6	Result	Notes	Points
1	Elina Tzengko	Greece	60.06	58.30	62.23	x	59.57	59.76	62.23		16
2	Maria Andrejczyk	Poland	50.11	57.35	x	54.57	60.42	x	60.42	SB	15
3	Liveta Jasiūnaitė	Lithuania	58.88	56.75	56.96	56.64	55.73	x	58.88		14
4	Bekah Walton	Great Britain	58.63	55.39	x	52.79	53.89	58.20	58.63		13
5	Paola Padovan	Italy	55.83	53.32	53.74	57.91	53.66		57.91	PB	12
6	Alizée Minard	France	48.06	56.81	54.80	56.31	55.90		56.81		11
7	Andrea Železná	Czech Republic	54.72	53.29	54.95	x	53.63		54.95		10
8	Beatrice Lantz	Sweden	53.16	49.71	48.16	x	50.55		53.16		9
9	Dewi Lafontaine	Netherlands	52.34	49.59	52.77				52.77		8
10	Paula Rodriguez	Spain	47.87	49.32	52.43				52.43		7
11	Julia Ulbricht	Germany	x	52.19	x				52.19		6
12	Jenice Koller	Switzerland	51.24	48.70	52.11				52.11	PB	5
13	Annabella Bogdán	Hungary	51.43	50.13	50.29				51.43		4
14	Pilke Kössi	Finland	x	43.50	48.47				48.47		3
15	Viktoriya Banyra	Ukraine	48.38	46.23	44.09				48.38	SB	2
16	Marta Trovoada	Portugal	41.15	41.86	43.95				43.95		1

== Mixed event ==
=== 4 x 400 metres relay ===
Place	Heat	Lane	Country	Athletes	Time	Notes	Points
1	A	7	Poland	Maksymilian Szwed, Justyna Święty-Ersetic, Daniel Sołtysiak, Natalia Bukowiecka	3:09.43	CR, WL, NR	16
2	A	6	Italy	Edoardo Scotti, Virginia Troiani, Vladimir Aceti, Alice Mangione	3:09.66	NR	15
3	A	8	Great Britain	Samuel Reardon, Lina Nielsen, Toby Harries, Emily Newnham	3:09.66	SB	14
4	A	3	Spain	Manuel Guijarro, Blanca Hervás, Julio Arenas, Paula Sevilla	3:10.48	NR	13
5	A	2	France	Gilles Biron, Fanny Peltier, Yann Spillmann, Alexe Déau	3:11.71	SB	12
6	A	4	Netherlands	Keenan Blake, Myrte van der Schoot, Jonas Phijffers, Nina Franke	3:12.92	SB	11
7	A	5	Germany	Manuel Sanders, Jana Lakner, Joshua Abuaku, Irina Gorr	3:13.21	SB	10
8	B	3	Hungary	Patrik Simon Enyingi, Sarolta Kriszt, Árpád Kovács, Janka Molnár	3:14.97	SB	9
9	B	5	Sweden	Oskar Edlund, Marie Kimumba, David Thid, Elna Wester	3:15.40	NR	8
10	B	2	Finland	Konsta Alatupa, Mette Baas, Eljas Aalto, Viivi Lehikoinen	3:15.60	NR	7
11	B	8	Ukraine	Mykyta Barabanov, Maryana Shostak, Oleksandr Pohorilko, Tetyana Melnyk	3:16.18	SB	6
12	B	7	Greece	Vladimiros Andreadis, Andrianna Ferra, George John Franks, Dimitra Tsoukala	3:19.02	NR	5
13	B	1	Lithuania	Tomas Keršulis, Eva Aušraitė, Lukas Sutkus, Modesta Justė Morauskaitė	3:19.86	SB	4
14	A	1	Czech Republic	Milan Ščibráni, Barbora Malíková, Matĕj Krsek, Zuzana Cymbálová	3:20.01	SB	3
–	B	4	Portugal	Ericsson Tavares, Fatoumata Binta Diallo, Omar Elkhatib, Carina Vanessa		DQ	0
–	B	6	Switzerland	Vincent Gendre, Lena Wernli, Julien Bonvin, Catia Gubelmann		DQ	0

== See also ==
- 2025 European Athletics Team Championships Second Division
- 2025 European Athletics Team Championships Third Division
