= Athletics at the 2024 Summer Olympics – Men's 200 metres =

Men's 200 metres at the Games of the XXXIII Olympiad
- Venue: Stade de France, Paris, France
- Dates: 5 August 2024 (heats); 6 August 2024 (repechage round); 7 August 2024 (semi-finals); 8 August 2024 (final)
- Competitors: 45 from 26 nations
- Winning time: 19.46 WL

Medalists
1st place, gold medalist(s)		Letsile Tebogo	Botswana
2nd place, silver medalist(s)		Kenneth Bednarek	United States
3rd place, bronze medalist(s)		Noah Lyles	United States

Official Video

The men's 200 metres at the 2024 Summer Olympics was held in four rounds at the Stade de France in Paris, France, between 5 and 8 August 2024. This was the 29th time that the men's 200 metres was contested at the Summer Olympics. A total of 48 athletes were able to qualify for the event by entry standard or ranking.

== Summary ==
The event was stable, with the first six at the previous Olympics all returning. After winning three successive World Championships in a row, the 2020 bronze medalist, Noah Lyles was the favorite. The defending champion, Andre De Grasse, was the silver medalist in 2016 and at the 2019 World Championships. The returning silver medalist, Kenny Bednarek also finished second to Lyles in 2022 but was left off the podium in 2023, finishing fifth. Fourth place in 2021 was the youngster Erriyon Knighton, now 20 years old but experienced, having finished third in 2022 and second in 2023. Lyles' forte that has helped him win not only 200 metre races but more recently the 100 metres in 2023 and these Olympics is his closing top end speed. Fifth place in 2021 was Joseph Fahnbulleh with a notoriously poor start, but with consistent fast closing speed, picking off competitors down the home stretch year after year. And in 2023, bronze medalist Letsile Tebogo was actually gaining on Lyles toward the finish. Another wild card here is the sole appearance of these games by 400 metre world record holder and 2016 Olympic champion Wayde van Niekerk.

The first semi-final saw Bednarek running a relaxed 20.00 but Alexander Ogando displaced De Grasse. The second saw Tebogo beat Lyles with a 19.96. Knighton and Fahnbulleh qualified out of semi 3 with van Niekerk tying for last place. Time qualifiers were both from Zimbabwe; Tapiwanashe Makarawu and Makanakaishe Charamba.

In the final, Tebogo achieved the fastest start, with Lyles giving 0.1 seconds. Bednarek quickly moved out through the turn to take the lead by 0.05 seconds over Tebogo, who was starting to move. Bednarek and Tebogo entered the straightaway, side by side, with Lyles a small distance behind. From there Tebogo accelerated for a relaxed win. Lyles struggled to achieve a fast closing speed, as his form fell apart towards the end. He held his position ahead of Knighton to finish third. Second, third, and fourth places were identical to the previous Olympics, but with Tebogo taking first place.

Tebogo became the 5th fastest performer in history, setting a new African record. Bednarek and Lyles also recorded sprints that ranked among the top ten fastest 200m times in Olympic history.

After the race, Lyles collapsed on the track and was taken off in a wheelchair. It was later confirmed that he had tested positive for COVID-19 two days prior, which affected his performance. He later stated he would not run in the 4x100m or 4x400m relay races.

== Background ==
The men's 200 metres has been present on the Olympic athletics programme since 1900. The reigning Olympic champion was Andre De Grasse from Canada.

Global records before the 2024 Summer Olympics
Record	Athlete (nation)	Time (s)	Location	Date
World record	Usain Bolt (JAM)	19.19	Berlin, Germany	20 August 2009
Olympic record	Usain Bolt (JAM)	19.30	Beijing, China	20 August 2008
World leading	Noah Lyles (USA)	19.53	Eugene, United States	29 June 2024

Area records before the 2024 Summer Olympics
Area record	Athlete (nation)	Time (s)
Africa (records)	Letsile Tebogo (BOT)	19.50
Asia (records)	Xie Zhenye (CHN)	19.88
Europe (records)	Pietro Mennea (ITA)	19.72
North, Central America and Caribbean (records)	Usain Bolt (JAM)	19.19 WR
Oceania (records)	Peter Norman (AUS)	20.06
South America (records)	Alonso Edward (PAN)	19.81

== Competition format ==
The 2024 edition of the event introduced a significant change to the competition format in the addition of a repechage round. For the first round to semifinals advancement, instead of the "fastest losers" method used previously (and still used for the repechage to semifinals and the semifinals to final advancements), all of the runners who did not qualify on place received a second chance to run in the repechage round. This increased the number of rounds from three to four, and guaranteed that all runners could run at least twice.

In the first round, the top 3 in each of the 6 heats advanced to the semifinals, with all remaining runners relegated to the repechage. The repechage had 4 heats, with the top 1 runner in each heat plus the next 2 fastest overall advancing to the semifinals. For the semifinals, the top 2 in each of the 3 heats advanced along with the next 2 fastest overall.

== Qualification ==
For the men's 200 metres event, the qualification period was between 1 July 2023 and 30 June 2024. 48 athletes were able to qualify for the event, with a maximum of three athletes per nation, by running the entry standard of 20.16 seconds or faster or by their World Athletics Ranking for this event.

== Results ==
=== Heats ===
The heats were held on 5 August, starting at 19:55 (UTC+2) in the evening.

==== Heat 1 ====
Rank	Lane	Athlete	Nation	Time	Notes
1	4	Joseph Fahnbulleh	Liberia	20.20	Q
2	9	Eseosa Desalu	Italy	20.26	Q
3	3	Wayde van Niekerk	South Africa	20.42	Q
4	7	Ryan Zeze	France	20.49	
5	8	Felix Svensson	Switzerland	20.54 (.534)	
6	2	Cheickna Traore	Ivory Coast	20.54 (.536)	
7	5	Calab Law	Australia	20.75	
8	6	Albert Komański	Poland	20.77	
				Wind: +0.1 m/s	

==== Heat 2 ====
Rank	Lane	Athlete	Nation	Time	Notes
1	3	Tarsis Orogot	Uganda	20.32	Q
2	9	Wanya McCoy	Bahamas	20.35	Q
3	6	Renan Gallina	Brazil	20.41	Q
4	7	Andrew Hudson	Jamaica	20.53	
5	2	Udodi Onwuzurike	Nigeria	20.55	
6	8	César Almirón	Paraguay	20.87	
7	4	Tomáš Němejc	Czech Republic	21.03	
—	5	José González	Dominican Republic	DNS	
				Wind: -0.1 m/s	

==== Heat 3 ====
Rank	Lane	Athlete	Nation	Time	Notes
1	3	Letsile Tebogo	Botswana	20.10	Q
2	4	Makanakaishe Charamba	Zimbabwe	20.27	Q
3	8	Filippo Tortu	Italy	20.29	Q
4	2	Brendon Rodney	Canada	20.30	SB
5	5	Timothé Mumenthaler	Switzerland	20.63	
6	7	Koki Ueyama	Japan	20.84	
7	6	Benjamin Richardson	South Africa	51.86	injury
				Wind: -0.1 m/s	

==== Heat 4 ====
Rank	Lane	Athlete	Nation	Time	Notes
1	3	Kenneth Bednarek	United States	19.96	Q
2	5	Alexander Ogando	Dominican Republic	20.04	Q
3	2	Joshua Hartmann	Germany	20.30	Q
4	7	Diego Pettorossi	Italy	20.63	
5	4	Shota Iizuka	Japan	20.67	
6	6	Ondřej Macík	Czech Republic	21.04	
—	8	Zharnel Hughes	Great Britain	DNS	
				Wind: +0.2 m/s	

==== Heat 5 ====
Rank	Lane	Athlete	Nation	Time	Notes
1	4	Erriyon Knighton	United States	19.99	Q
2	3	Tapiwanashe Makarawu	Zimbabwe	20.07	Q
3	7	Shaun Maswanganyi	South Africa	20.20	Q
4	2	Aaron Brown	Canada	20.36	
5	9	Ian Kerr	Bahamas	20.53	
6	6	Pablo Mateo	France	20.58	
7	8	Erik Erlandsson	Sweden	20.65	
8	5	Eduard Kubelík	Czech Republic	21.14	
				Wind: +0.2 m/s	

==== Heat 6 ====
Rank	Lane	Athlete	Nation	Time	Notes
1	6	Noah Lyles	United States	20.19	Q
2	7	Andre De Grasse	Canada	20.30	Q
3	4	Towa Uzawa	Japan	20.33	Q
4	5	Bryan Levell	Jamaica	20.47	
5	2	Blessing Afrifah	Israel	20.78	
6	8	Chun-Han Yang	Chinese Taipei	20.83	
7	3	William Reais	Switzerland	20.92	
				Wind: +0.1 m/s	

=== Repechage round ===
The repechage round was held on 6 August, starting at 12:30 (UTC+2) in the afternoon.

==== Heat 1 ====
Rank	Lane	Athlete	Nation	Time	Notes
1	6	Udodi Onwuzurike	Nigeria	20.51	Q
2	8	Diego Pettorossi	Italy	20.53	
3	5	Timothé Mumenthaler	Switzerland	20.67	
4	7	Shota Iizuka	Japan	20.72	
5	4	Ondřej Macík	Czech Republic	21.14	
—	3	Cheickna Traore	Ivory Coast	DNS	
				Wind: +1.0 m/s	

==== Heat 2 ====
Rank	Lane	Athlete	Nation	Time	Notes
1	4	Brendon Rodney	Canada	20.42	Q
2	5	Bryan Levell	Jamaica	20.47	q
3	8	Pablo Mateo	France	20.57	
4	6	Koki Ueyama	Japan	20.92	
—	3	César Almirón	Paraguay	DQ	TR17.2.3[C]
—	7	Calab Law	Australia	DNS	
				Wind: +0.6 m/s	

==== Heat 3 ====
Rank	Lane	Athlete	Nation	Time	Notes
1	7	Ryan Zeze	France	20.40	Q
2	4	Aaron Brown	Canada	20.42	q
3	6	Chun-Han Yang	Chinese Taipei	20.73	
4	3	Blessing Afrifah	Israel	20.88	
5	2	Albert Komański	Poland	20.90	
6	8	Eduard Kubelík	Czech Republic	21.20	
—	5	William Reais	Switzerland	DNS	
				Wind: 0.0 m/s	

==== Heat 4 ====
Rank	Lane	Athlete	Nation	Time	Notes
1	6	Erik Erlandsson	Sweden	20.49	Q, PB
2	7	Andrew Hudson	Jamaica	20.55	
3	8	Ian Kerr	Bahamas	20.60	
4	5	Felix Svensson	Switzerland	20.65	
5	3	Tomáš Němejc	Czech Republic	20.84	
—	4	Benjamin Richardson	South Africa	DNS	
				Wind: +0.3 m/s	

=== Semi-finals ===
The semi-finals were held on 7 August, starting at 20:02 (UTC+2) in the evening.

==== Semifinal 1 ====
Rank	Lane	Athlete	Nation	Time	Notes
1	7	Kenneth Bednarek	United States	20.00	Q
2	8	Alexander Ogando	Dominican Republic	20.09	Q
3	5	Andre De Grasse	Canada	20.41	
4	4	Shaun Maswanganyi	South Africa	20.42	
5	9	Wanya McCoy	Bahamas	20.61	
6	6	Tarsis Gracious Orogot	Uganda	20.64	
7	3	Ryan Zeze	France	20.81	
8	2	Bryan Levell	Jamaica	20.93	
				Wind: -0.1 m/s	

==== Semifinal 2 ====
Rank	Lane	Athlete	Nation	Time	Notes
1	8	Letsile Tebogo	Botswana	19.96	Q
2	6	Noah Lyles	United States	20.08	Q
3	4	Makanakaishe Charamba	Zimbabwe	20.31	q
4	7	Eseosa Fostine Desalu	Italy	20.37	
5	5	Joshua Hartmann	Germany	20.47	
6	9	Towa Uzawa	Japan	20.54	
7	3	Aaron Brown	Canada	20.57	
8	2	Erik Erlandsson	Sweden	20.93	
				Wind: -0.2 m/s	

==== Semifinal 3 ====
Rank	Lane	Athlete	Nation	Time	Notes
1	8	Erriyon Knighton	United States	20.09	Q
2	6	Joseph Fahnbulleh	Liberia	20.12	Q
3	7	Tapiwanashe Makarawu	Zimbabwe	20.16	q
4	5	Filippo Tortu	Italy	20.54	
5	3	Brendon Rodney	Canada	20.59	
6	9	Renan Gallina	Brazil	20.60	
7	2	Udodi Chudi Onwuzurike	Nigeria	20.72 (.717)	
7	4	Wayde van Niekerk	South Africa	20.72 (.717)	
				Wind: -0.6 m/s	

=== Final ===
The final was held on 8 August, starting at 20:30 (UTC+2) in the evening.

Rank	Lane	Athlete	Nation	Time	Notes
1st place, gold medalist(s)	7	Letsile Tebogo	Botswana	19.46	AR, WL
2nd place, silver medalist(s)	8	Kenneth Bednarek	United States	19.62	
3rd place, bronze medalist(s)	5	Noah Lyles	United States	19.70	TR7.1[C]
4	6	Erriyon Knighton	United States	19.99	
5	4	Alexander Ogando	Dominican Republic	20.02	
6	2	Tapiwanashe Makarawu	Zimbabwe	20.10	
7	9	Joseph Fahnbulleh	Liberia	20.15	
8	3	Makanakaishe Charamba	Zimbabwe	20.53	
				Wind: +0.4 m/s	
