= 2023 European Athletics U23 Championships – Men's 200 metres =

Men's 200 metres at the 2023 European Athletics U23 Championships
- Venue: Leppävaara Stadium
- Location: Espoo, Finland
- Dates: 15 July (heats & semi-final); 16 July (final)
- Competitors: 40 from 24 nations
- Winning time: 20.67

Medalists
| gold medal | Blessing Afrifah | Israel |
| silver medal | Raphael Bouju | Netherlands |
| bronze medal | Timothé Mumenthaler | Switzerland |

The men's 200 metres event at the 2023 European Athletics U23 Championships was held in Espoo, Finland, at Leppävaara Stadium on 15 and 16 July.

== Records ==
Prior to the competition, the records were as follows:

| European U23 record | Christophe Lemaitre (FRA) | 19.80 | Daegu, South Korea | 3 September 2011 |
| Championship U23 record | Ján Volko (SVK) | 20.33 | Bydgoszcz, Poland | 15 July 2017 |

== Results ==
=== Heats ===
First 2 in each heat (Q) and the next 6 fastest (q) qualified for the semi-finals.

==== Heat 1 ====
| Place | Athlete | Nation | Time | Notes |
|---|---|---|---|---|
| 1 | Raphael Bouju | Netherlands | 20.83 | Q |
| 2 | Ondřej Macík | Czech Republic | 20.97 | Q |
| 3 | Igor Bogaczyński | Poland | 21.13 | q |
| 4 | Jacopo Albertin | Italy | 21.23 | |
| 5 | Linus Pihl | Sweden | 21.27 | |
| 6 | Jordan Jalce | France | 21.31 | |
| 7 | Simon Graf | Switzerland | 21.46 | |
| 8 | Anthony Smith | Turkey | 21.67 | |
| | | | Wind: (+0.4 m/s) | |

==== Heat 2 ====
| Place | Athlete | Nation | Time | Notes |
|---|---|---|---|---|
| 1 | Xavi Mo-Ajok | Netherlands | 20.95 | Q, SB |
| 2 | Bradley Lestrade | Switzerland | 21.07 | Q |
| 3 | James Hanson | Great Britain | 21.12 | q |
| 4 | Hugo Cerra | France | 21.12 | q |
| 5 | Vasilios Mirianthopoulos | Greece | 21.21 | |
| 6 | Oğuz Uyar | Turkey | 21.44 | |
| 7 | Jakub Nemec | Slovakia | 21.58 | |
| 8 | Beppe Grillo | Malta | 21.72 | |
| | | | Wind: (+0.1 m/s) | |

==== Heat 3 ====
| Place | Athlete | Nation | Time | Notes |
|---|---|---|---|---|
| 1 | Timothé Mumenthaler | Switzerland | 20.84 | Q |
| 2 | Ioannis Kariofyllis | Greece | 20.84 | Q, PB |
| 3 | Edoardo Luraschi | Italy | 21.10 | q, PB |
| 4 | Valtteri Louko | Finland | 21.26 | PB |
| 5 | Oskars Grava | Latvia | 21.28 | |
| 6 | Robin Ganter | Germany | 21.32 | |
| 7 | Mikkel Linnemand Johansson | Denmark | 21.68 | |
| — | Jaime Sancho | Spain | DNS | |
| | | | Wind: (+0.1 m/s) | |

==== Heat 4 ====
| Place | Athlete | Nation | Time | Notes |
|---|---|---|---|---|
| 1 | Marco Ricci | Italy | 20.98 | Q |
| 2 | Marcin Karolewski | Poland | 21.29 | Q |
| 3 | Eduard Kubelík | Czech Republic | 21.32 | |
| 4 | Jehan Anicet | France | 21.51 | |
| 5 | Robin Sapar | Estonia | 21.58 | |
| 6 | Kenny Emi Tijani-Ajayi | Norway | 21.63 | |
| 7 | Aviv Koffler | Israel | 21.69 | |
| — | Felix Frühn | Germany | DQ | TR 17.3.1 |
| | | | Wind: (+2.7 m/s) | |

==== Heat 5 ====
| Place | Athlete | Nation | Time | Notes |
|---|---|---|---|---|
| 1 | Blessing Afrifah | Israel | 20.65 | Q |
| 2 | Łukasz Żok | Poland | 20.74 | Q |
| 3 | Simon Wulff | Germany | 21.05 | q |
| 4 | Andrej Skočir | Slovenia | 21.12 | q |
| 5 | Colin Doyle | Ireland | 21.15 | |
| 6 | Gabriel Maia | Portugal | 21.33 | |
| 7 | Kristupas Seikauskas | Lithuania | 22.07 | |
| — | Ioannis Granitsiotis | Greece | DQ | TR 16.8 |
| | | | Wind: (+2.3 m/s) | |

=== Semi-finals ===
First 3 in each heat (Q) and the next 2 fastest (q) qualified for the final.

==== Heat 1 ====
| Place | Athlete | Nation | Time | Notes |
|---|---|---|---|---|
| 1 | Blessing Afrifah | Israel | 21.14 | Q |
| 2 | Xavi Mo-Ajok | Netherlands | 21.21 | Q |
| 3 | Marco Ricci | Italy | 21.28 | Q |
| 4 | Ondřej Macík | Czech Republic | 21.37 | q |
| 5 | James Hanson | Great Britain | 21.37 | |
| 6 | Edoardo Luraschi | Italy | 21.46 | |
| 7 | Bradley Lestrade | Switzerland | 21.47 | |
| 8 | Igor Bogaczyński | Poland | 25.85 | |
| | | | Wind: (−3.2 m/s) | |

==== Heat 2 ====
| Place | Athlete | Nation | Time | Notes |
|---|---|---|---|---|
| 1 | Raphael Bouju | Netherlands | 21.07 | Q, SB |
| 2 | Łukasz Żok | Poland | 21.28 | Q |
| 3 | Timothé Mumenthaler | Switzerland | 21.29 | Q |
| 4 | Ioannis Kariofyllis | Greece | 21.29 | q |
| 5 | Hugo Cerra | France | 21.38 | |
| 6 | Simon Wulff | Germany | 21.43 | |
| 7 | Andrej Skočir | Slovenia | 21.65 | |
| 8 | Marcin Karolewski | Poland | 21.94 | |
| | | | Wind: (−3.3 m/s) | |

=== Final ===
| Place | Lane | Athlete | Nation | Time | Notes |
|---|---|---|---|---|---|
| 1st place, gold medalist(s) | 6 | Blessing Afrifah | Israel | 20.67 | |
| 2nd place, silver medalist(s) | 5 | Raphael Bouju | Netherlands | 20.68 | |
| 3rd place, bronze medalist(s) | 4 | Timothé Mumenthaler | Switzerland | 20.85 | |
| 4 | 3 | Marco Ricci | Italy | 20.96 | |
| 5 | 1 | Ioannis Kariofyllis | Greece | 20.98 | |
| 6 | 8 | Łukasz Żok | Poland | 21.05 | |
| 7 | 2 | Ondřej Macík | Czech Republic | 21.35 | |
| 8 | 7 | Xavi Mo-Ajok | Netherlands | 1:11.18 | |
| | | | | Wind: (−1.1 m/s) | |
