= Timothé Mumenthaler =

Swiss athlete (born 2002)

Timothé Mumenthaler OLY
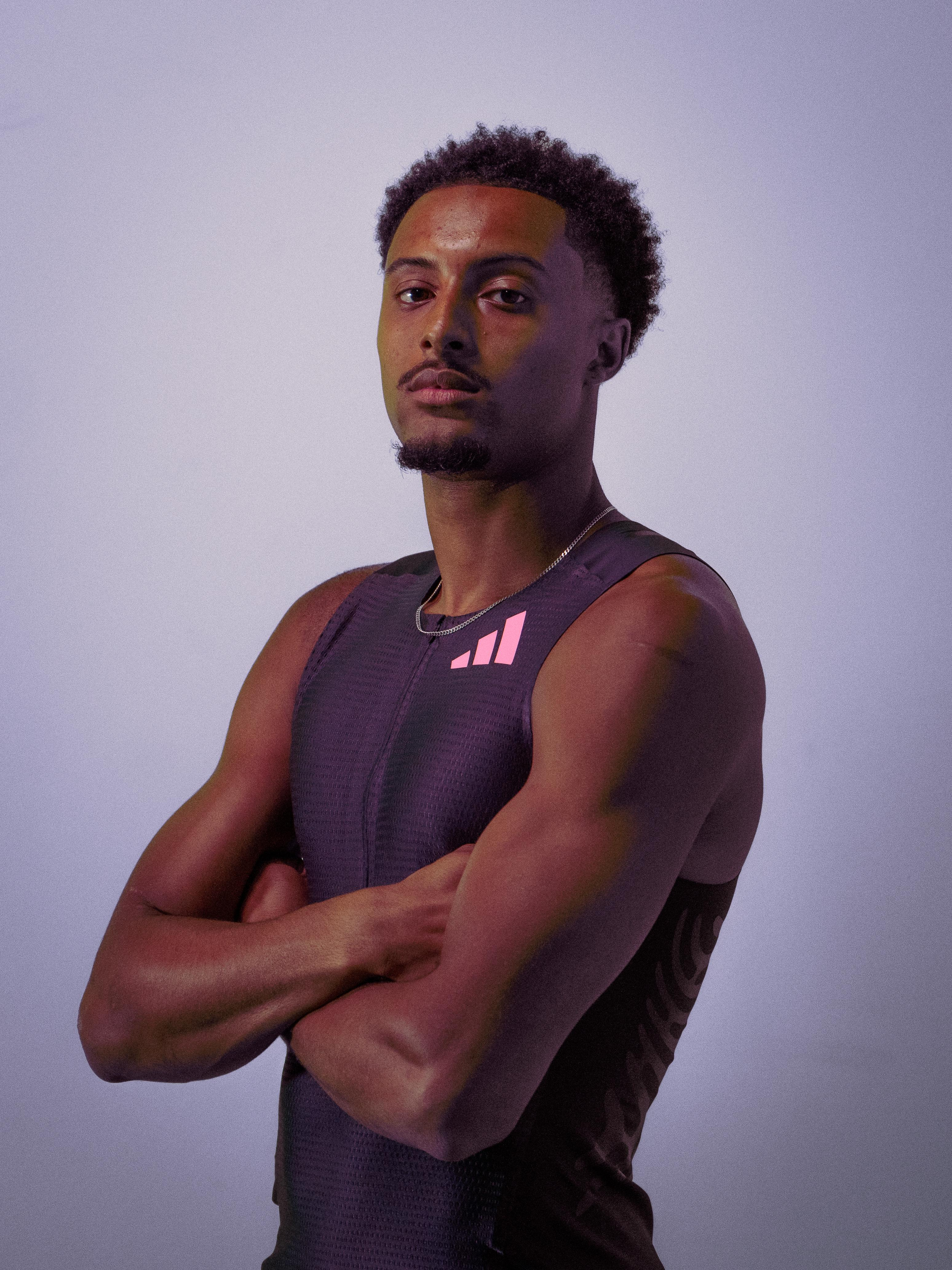

Personal information
- Nationality: Swiss
- Born: 12 December 2002 (age 23)
- Education: EPFL

Sport
- Sport: Athletics
- Event: Sprint

Achievements and titles
- Personal bests: 200 m: 20.09 (Birmingham, 2026)
Medal record
Men's athletics
Representing Switzerland
European Athletics Championships
Gold medal – first place	2024 Rome	200 m
Bronze medal – third place	2026 Birmingham	200 m
European U23 Championships
Bronze medal – third place	2023 Espoo	200 m

Timothé Sembéry Mumenthaler OLY (born 12 December 2002) is a Swiss sprinter. He won the 2024 European Championships in Rome over 200 metres, later also winning a bronze medal over the distance at the 2026 European Championships having run a personal best 20.09 seconds in the semi-final.

== Biography ==
He is a member of Stade Genève. In February 2018, he won the 60 metres and 200 metres at the Swiss Youth Indoor Championships in St. Gallen. He competed at the 2018 Summer Youth Olympics in Buenos Aires. He recorded a time for the 100 metres of 10.61 seconds aged 16 years-old. However, his progress was later slowed by injury.

In 2022, he was runner up in the Swiss Athletics Championships in the 100 metres. He finished fifth in the 200 metres at the 2023 European Athletics Team Championships First Division in Silesia, Poland in June 2023. He was a bronze medalist in the 200 m at the 2023 European Athletics U23 Championships in Espoo.

He ran as part of the Swiss 4 × 100 m relay team at the 2024 World Relays Championships in Nassau, Bahamas. He won the 200 metres gold medal at the European Athletics Championships in Rome, Italy, running 20.28 seconds. He reported muscular problems after the race in Rome, which affected his performance as he competed in the 200 m at the 2024 Olympics Games. He had a best time of 20.63 seconds in Paris, but did not progress to the semi-finals. He recovered to compete at the 2024 Athletissima in Lausanne, part of the 2024 Diamond League, later in August 2024, placing seventh in the 200 metres race.

He competed at the 2025 World Athletics Relays in China in the Men's 4 × 100 metres relay in May 2025. He ran a time of 20.27 seconds to set a new Swiss national record for the 200 metres at the 2025 Bislett Games, part of the 2025 Diamond League, on 12 June 2025.

In September 2025, he was a semi-finalist in the 200 metres at the 2025 World Championships in Tokyo, Japan.

He won the Swiss Indoor Championships over 60 metres on 1 March 2026, running 6.62 seconds in the final. In June, he had a fifth-place finish over 200 metres at the 2026 Bislett Games.

At the 2026 European Championships in Birmingham, England, Mumenthaler won the bronze medal in the 200 metres, sharing it with Italian Fausto Desalu after the pair could not be separated in the photo-finish. He had run a new personal best of 20.09 seconds in the semi-final. He was also a semi-finalist in the men's 100 metres at the championships. He also ran in the men's 4 x 100 metres relay at the championships. At the 2026 Diamond League Final in Brussels in September, he placed seventh over 200 metres. Later that month, he competed over 200 m at the inaugural World Ultimate Championship in Budapest.

== Personal life ==
Mumenthaler was born to a Swiss father and Senegalese mother. He grew up in Geneva, Switzerland. In 2023, he began pursuing a BSc in microengineering at Ecole polytechnique fédérale de Lausanne (EPFL), which he is completing on a part-time basis in parallel with his athletic career.
