= Rachel Bennett =

British sprinter (born 2002)

Personal information
- Born: 3 July 2002 (age 23)

Sport
- Sport: Athletics
- Event: Sprint

Achievements and titles
- Personal best(s): 60m: 7.43 (2025); 100m: 11.26 (2025); 200m: 22.87 (2025)

Rachel Bennett (born 3 July 2002) is a British sprinter from County Durham. She made her senior international debut for Great Britain at the 2025 European Athletics Team Championships competing in the 200 metres and the women's 4 x 100 metres relay.

== Early life ==
She is from Newton Aycliffe in County Durham and attended Barnard Castle School. She competed as a youngster for Shildon Running and Athletics Club.

== Career ==
In 2018, she won the Scottish U17 indoor title over 200 metres, and finished fourth England Athletics U17 national indoor championships at that distance. That year, she finished fourth at the England outdoor championship over 100 metres in a personal best time.

She finishes fourth overall in the 200 metres at the 2024 British Indoor Athletics Championships in Birmingham. She was also a finalist in June 2024 over 200 metres at the outdoor 2024 British Athletics Championships in Manchester, placing eighth in the final.

She reached the final of the 200 metres again at the 2025 British Indoor Athletics Championships in Birmingham, in February 2025. In May 2025, she won the 200 metres at the Loughborough International whilst competing for England, running a time of 23.74 seconds into a -2.1 mp/s headwind. She lowered her personal best for the 100 metres to 11.26 seconds (+0.2 m/ps) in London in June 2025.

She was selected for her senior international debut for the Great Britain team at the 2025 European Athletics Team Championships in Madrid, Spain, in June 2025. She ran as part of the British 4 x 100 metres relay team which placed eighth overall on 28 June. The following day, she returned to the track and ran a personal best 22.87 seconds (+0.8 m/ps) in the individual 200 metres race, helping the Great Britain team to finish in fifth place overall. On 3 August, she qualified for the final of the 200 metres at the 2025 UK Athletics Championships in Birmingham, placing eighth overall.
