= Felix Svensson =

Swiss sprinter (born 1997)

Felix Svensson OLY
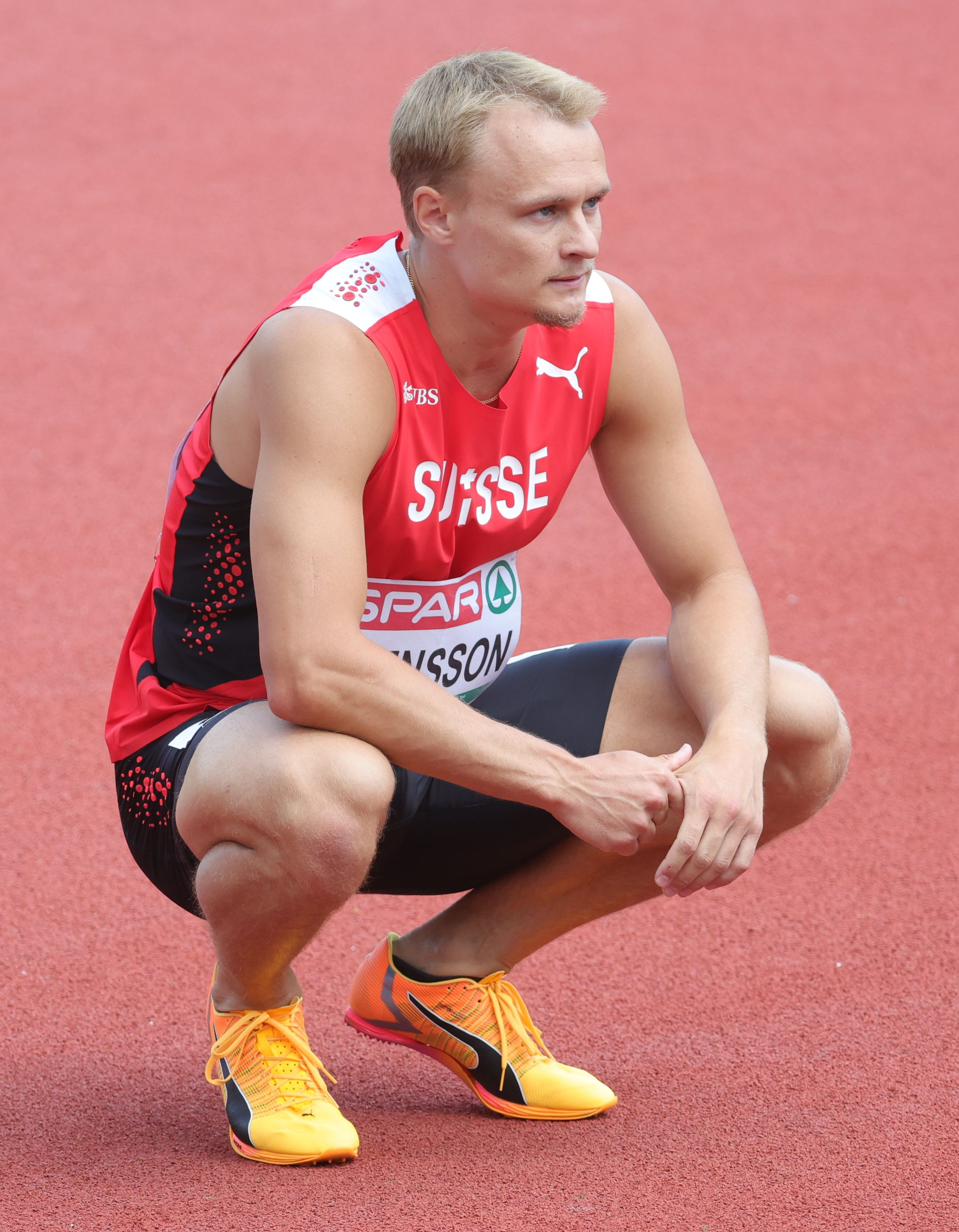
- Svensson in 2022

Personal information
- Born: 9 August 1997 (age 29) Gothenburg, Sweden

Sport
- Country: Switzerland
- Sport: Athletics
- Event: 200 metres

Felix Svensson OLY (born 9 August 1997) is a Swedish-born Swiss sprinter competing primarily in the 200 metres. He qualified for the 200 metres at the 2024 Summer Olympics. Born in Gothenburg, Svensson has represented Switzerland since 2019, but did not gain full eligibility for international competitions until 2022.

In January 2024, he set the Swiss national indoor record for the 200 metres, running 20.92. In July, he qualified for the 2024 Summer Olympics.

He is the son of former 400-metre hurdler Frida Svensson and tennis player Jonas Svensson.

== Career ==
Svensson´s family moved to Switzerland in 2001, and he grew up in the French-speaking part of the country. He initially played tennis and began athletics to improve his conditioning for the sport.

Representing Sweden, Svensson finished fifth in the 200 metres at the 2017 European Athletics U23 Championships in Bydgoszcz. There, he recorded a personal best of 20.87s in the semi-finals before delivering another sub-21 performance (20.95s) in the final.

Having previously represented Sweden internationally, Svensson decided in 2019 to change national teams and henceforth, to compete for Switzerland in the future. During his transition time, he was not eligible to represent any nation resulting in him not competing internationally for three years. He became eligible to compete for Switzerland in 2022.

In 2022, Svensson won the Swiss indoor 200 metres title and set a national record of 20.92s. In June the same year, he ran 20.43s in Zofingen to meet the qualifiying standard for the 2022 European Championships in Munich.

== Achievements ==
=== Personal bests ===
- 100 metres – 10.51 (Basel 2021)
- 200 metres – 20.30 (Winterthur 2024)
  - Indoor – 20.92 (Luxembourg 2024) NR
- 400 metres – 46.23 (La Chaux-de-Fonds 2021)

=== International competitions ===
Year	Competition	Venue	Position	Event	Time	Notes
Representing Switzerland
2018	European Championships	Berlin, Germany	18th (h)	200 m	20.95	
2018	European Championships	Berlin, Germany	N/A	4 × 400 m relay	DNF	
2022	European Championships	Munich, Germany	15th (h)	200 m	20.90	
2022	European Championships	Munich, Germany	5th	4 × 100 m relay	38.36	NR
2023	World Championships	Budapest, Hungary	11th	4 × 100 m relay	38.65	
2024	European Championships	Rome, Italy	11th (sf)	200 m	20.66	
2024	European Championships	Rome, Italy	7th (h)	4 × 100 m relay	38.70	
2024	Olympic Games	Paris, France	11th (rep)	200 m	20.65	
2026	European Championships	Birmingham, United Kingdom	22nd (h)	200 m	21.33	
2026	European Championships	Birmingham, United Kingdom	9th (h)	4 × 100 m relay	39.18	

=== National titles ===
- Swedish Championships
  - 200 metres: 2018, 2020
- Swiss Indoor Championships
  - 200 metres: 2022
- Swiss U23 Championships
  - 200 metres: 2019
- Swedish U23 Championships
  - 200 metres: 2019
- Swiss U20 Championships
  - 100 metres: 2016
