= Erik Erlandsson =

Swedish athlete (born 2004)

Personal information
- Nationality: Swedish
- Born: 22 May 2004 (age 22)

Sport
- Sport: Athletics
- Event: Sprint

Achievements and titles
- Personal bests: 200m: 20.43 (Växjo, 2025)

Erik Erlandsson (born 22 May 2004) is a Swedish sprinter. He became Swedish national indoor champion over 200 metres in 2024 and national record holder over 200 metres indoors in 2025.

== Biography ==
A member of IFK Lund, in January 2023 he set a new Swedish indoor junior record of 21.03 seconds for the 200 metres. On 12 February 2023, at the Nordenkampen in Karlstad, Erlandsson lowered that record again to 20.99 seconds.

Erlandsson had a difficult time in the rest of 2023, marred by injuries. However, he became Swedish indoor champion over 200 metres in Karlstad in February 2024 running 20.98 seconds for the win.

Erlandsson finished fourth in the 200 metres at the 2024 European Athletics Championships in Rome in 20.57 seconds, having run 20.55 and a personal best 20.52 seconds in the qualifying rounds. He competed in the 200m at the 2024 Paris Olympics, where he reached the semi-finals.

On 17 January 2025, he set a new Swedish indoor 200m record time of 20.43 in Växjö, breaking Johan Wissman's record from 2004. He equalled that time to win the 200 metres at the Czech Indoor Gala in Ostrava on 4 February 2025. He ran 20.50 to win the 200m title at the Swedish Indoor Championships. Competing at the 2026 European Athletics Championships in Birmingham, England he reached the semi-finals in the 200 metres.

== Personal life ==
Erlandsson is from Genarp.
