= Tomáš Němejc =

Czech athlete (born 2000)

Personal information
- Born: 24 February 2000 (age 26) Tábor, Czech Republic

Sport
- Sport: Athletics
- Event: Sprint

Achievements and titles
- Personal bests: 200m: 20.52 (Rome, 2024)

Tomáš Němejc (born 24 February 2000) is a Czech sprinter. In 2024, he won Czech national titles over 200 metres both indoors and outdoors. He was a finalist over that distance at the 2024 European Athletics Championships and competed at the 2024 Olympic Games.

== Early life ==
Němejc was born on 24 February 2000 in Tábor. He started competing in athletics in primary school and would train at a sports gymnasium in České Budějovice. He attended the University of West Bohemia in Plzeň.

== Career ==
He won the national title at the Czech Indoor Athletics Championships in Ostrava in February 2024, in a time of 20.82 seconds. He competed at the 2024 European Athletics Championships in Rome, Italy, where he became the first Czech man to reach the final of the 200 metres for 55 years and ran a personal best time of 20.52 seconds. He placed sixth overall in the final in a time of 20.91 seconds.

He won the Czech Athletics Championships outdoor national title over 200 metres in Zlín in June 2024 in a time of 20.58 seconds. He competed in the 200m at the 2024 Olympic Games in Paris, France. He ran 20.84 seconds in the repechage round but did not qualify for the semi-finals.

In January 2025, racing over 300 metres, he ran a personal record of 33.35 seconds to move to fifth place on the Czech all-time list. He ran an indoors personal best time of 20.65 seconds to retain his national 200 metres title at the Czech Indoor Athletics Championships in Ostrava, in February 2025. His Dukla Prague team also won the 4 x 200 metres relay at the Championships.

In June 2025, he was part of the Czech men's 4 x 100 metres relay team which set a new senior national record, whilst competing at the 2025 European Athletics Team Championships First Division in Madrid; running 38.59 seconds alongside Zdeněk Stromšík, Eduard Kubelík, and Ondřej Macík.

In September 2025, he competed in the 200 metres at the 2025 World Championships in Tokyo, Japan.
