= Fausto Desalu =

Italian sprinter (born 1994)

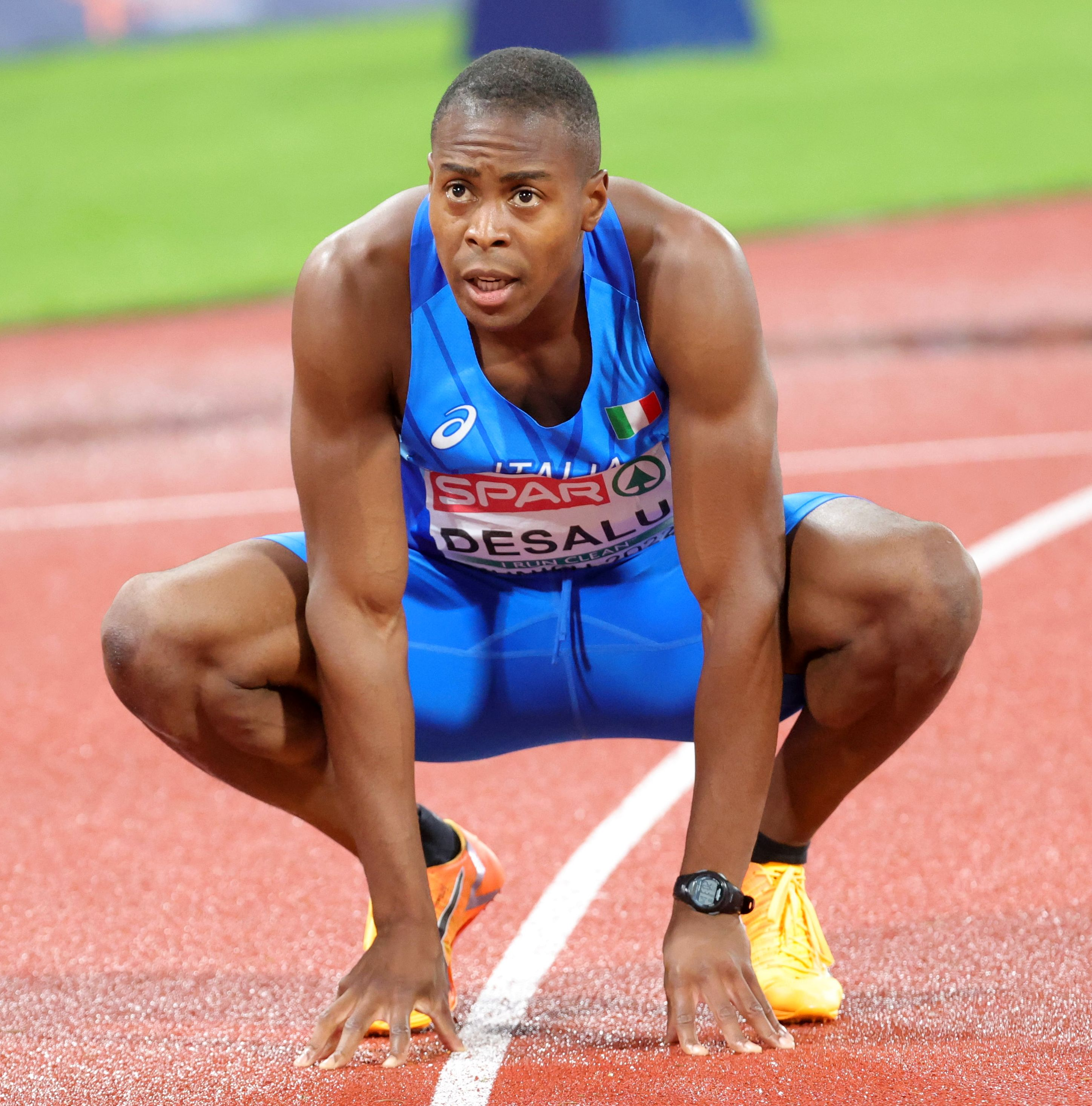
- Desalu in 2022

Personal information
- Full name: Eseosa Fostine Desalu
- Nationality: Nigerian and Italian
- Born: 19 February 1994 (age 32) Casalmaggiore, Italy
- Height: 1.79 m (5 ft 10 in)
- Weight: 69 kg (152 lb)

Sport
- Sport: Athletics
- Event: Sprint
- Club: G.S. Fiamme Gialle
- Coached by: Giangiacomo Contini; Sebastian Bacchieri

Achievements and titles
- Personal bests: 100 m: 10.21 (2022); 200 m: 20"08 (2024)
Medal record
Men's athletics
Representing Italy
Olympic Games
Gold medal – first place	2020 Tokyo	4 × 100 m relay
World Relays
Gold medal – first place	2021 Chorzów	4 × 100 m relay
European Championships
Bronze medal – third place	2026 Birmingham	200 m
Mediterranean Games
Silver medal – second place	2018 Tarragona	200 m
Military World Games
Gold medal – first place	2015 Mungyeong	200 m

Eseosa Fostine "Fausto" Desalu (Italian pronunciation: [ezeˈoːza ˈfausto deˈzaːlu]; born 19 February 1994) is an Italian sprinter who specialises in the 200 metres. He is the second-fastest Italian ever in the distance behind only Pietro Mennea, with a personal best of 20.08 seconds.

He was part of the 4 × 100 m relay team that won gold at the 2020 Summer Olympics.

== Biography ==
Born in Casalmaggiore, Italy, to Nigerian parents, Desalu acquired Italian citizenship in 2012, aged 18.

He originally focused on association football in his youth. However, he began to take up track and field around 2008, initially focusing on the sprint hurdles. His speed was better than his technique and he eventually focused on the 200 m instead. He gained full Italian citizenship in 2012. A member of Gruppi Sportivi Fiamme Gialle – the sports club of Italy's fiscal police force – he made his international debut at the 2012 World Junior Championships in Athletics. However, he failed to progress beyond the heats. He also ran with the 4 × 100 metres relay team, but they were also eliminated in the heats stage.

Desalu's first international medal came at the 2013 European Athletics Junior Championships, where he was a relay bronze medallist on home turf in Rieti, running the anchor leg on a team of Giacomo Isolano, Lorenzo Bilotti and Roberto Rigali. He also managed fifth place individually in the 200 m. His first senior medal followed at the 2014 European Team Championships, where he was part of the bronze medal-winning relay quartet alongside Massimiliano Ferraro, Diego Marani, and Delmas Obou. He was selected both individually and for the relay for Italy at the 2014 European Athletics Championships. He was a semi-finalist in the 200 m, having set a best of 20.55 seconds in the heats, and was a finalist in the relay with Fabio Cerutti, Marani and Obou (although the Italians failed to finish).

Desalu had his first appearance at global senior level at the 2015 IAAF World Relays, though the regrouped European Championships team did not make it past the heats. At the 2015 Military World Games he won the 200 m gold medal, a tenth of a second ahead of runner-up Serhiy Smelyk. He came close to a second medal at the games in the relay, placing fourth with Cerutti, Obou and Matteo Galvan.

On 4 September 2020, he became the first Italian to win a 200 m race event of the Diamond League during the Memorial Van Damme in 20.39 seconds. The following year, he made history by being part of the Italian team that won the gold medal in the 4 × 100 m relay at the 2020 Olympic Games held in Tokyo.

At the 2026 European Championships held in Birmingham, Desalu claimed the bronze medal in the 200 metres with a time of 20.26 seconds.

== Statistics ==
=== National records ===
- 4 × 100 m relay: 37.50 ( (Japan) Tokyo, 6 August 2021), he ran third leg in the team with Lorenzo Patta, Marcell Jacobs, Filippo Tortu.

=== Personal bests ===
- 60 metres – 6.76 seconds (2015)
- 100 metres – 10.21 seconds (2022)
- 200 metres – 20.08 seconds (2024)
- 110 metres hurdles – 14.20 seconds (2010)
- 60 metres hurdles – 7.86 seconds (2011)
- All information from European Athletics

For reference:

- split time of 4 × 100 m relay - 9.170 (third leg) (2021)

=== Achievements ===
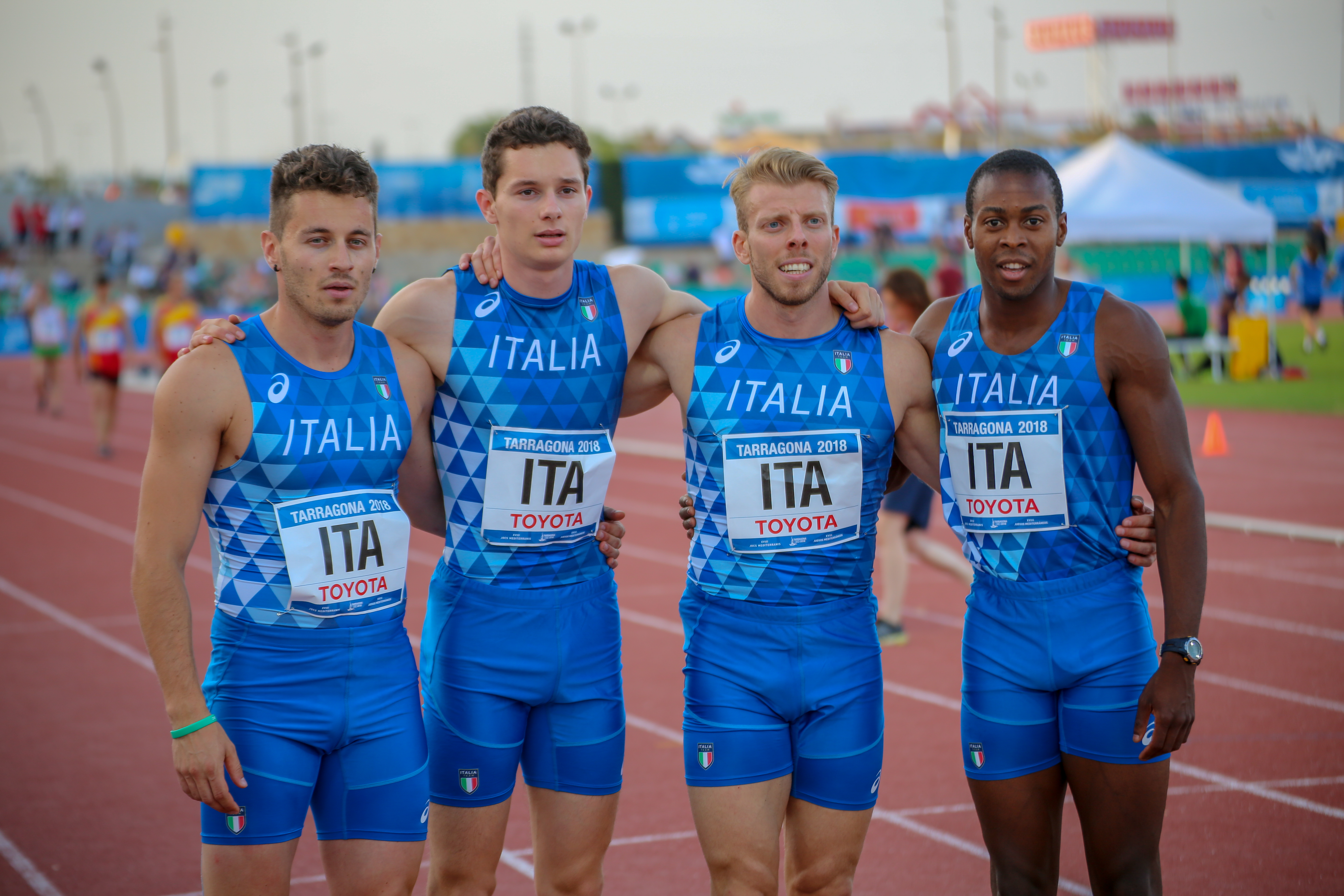
Desalu (first from right) with Federico Cattaneo, Filippo Tortu and Davide Manenti, the Italian national track relay team, at the 2018 Mediterranean Games.

Year	Competition	Venue	Position	Event	Notes
2012	World Junior Championships	Barcelona, Spain	— (heats)	200 m	DQ
2012	World Junior Championships	Barcelona, Spain	5th (heats)	4 × 100 m relay	40.41
2013	European Junior Championships	Rieti, Italy	5th	200 m	21.16
2013	European Junior Championships	Rieti, Italy	3rd	4 × 100 m relay	40.00
2014	European Team Championships	Braunschweig, Germany	3rd	4 × 100 m relay	39.06
2014	European Championships	Zürich, Switzerland	7th (semis)	200 m	20.73
2014	European Championships	Zürich, Switzerland	—	4 × 100 m relay	DNF
2015	IAAF World Relays	Nassau, Bahamas	3rd (heats)	4 × 100 m relay	38.84
2015	Military World Games	Mungyeong, South Korea	1st	200 m	20.64
2015	Military World Games	Mungyeong, South Korea	4th	4 × 100 m relay	39.64
2016	Olympic Games	Rio de Janeiro, Brazil	49th (h)	200 m	20.65
2017	IAAF World Relays	Nassau, Bahamas	–	4 × 100 m relay	DQ
2018	Mediterranean Games	Tarragona, Spain	2nd	200 m	20.77
2018	Mediterranean Games	Tarragona, Spain	1st	4 × 100 m relay	38.49
2018	European Championships	Berlin, Germany	6th	200 m	20.13
2018	European Championships	Berlin, Germany	–	4 × 100 m relay	DQ
2019	World Relays	Yokohama, Japan	3rd (h)	4 × 100 m relay	38.29^{1}
2019	World Championships	Doha, Qatar	21st (sf)	200 m	20.73
2021	World Relays	Chorzów, Poland	1st	4 × 100 m relay	39.21
2021	Olympic Games	Tokyo, Japan	16th (sf)	200 m	20.43
2021	Olympic Games	Tokyo, Japan	1st	4 × 100 m relay	37.50 NR
2022	World Championships	Eugene, United States	30th (h)	200 m	20.63
2022	World Championships	Eugene, United States	10th (h)	4 × 100 m relay	38.74
2022	European Championships	Munich, Germany	13th (sf)	200 m	20.48
2023	World Championships	Budapest, Hungary	23rd (h)	200 m	20.49
2024	European Championships	Rome, Italy	5th	200 m	20.59
2024	Olympic Games	Paris, France	9th (sf)	200 m	20.37
2024	Olympic Games	Paris, France	5th (h)	4 × 100 m relay	38.07
2025	World Relays	Guangzhou, China	5th	4 × 100 m relay	38.20
2025	World Championships	Tokyo, Japan	25th (h)	200 m	20.43
2025	World Championships	Tokyo, Japan	11th (h)	4 × 100 m relay	38.52
2026	European Championships	Birmingham, United Kingdom	3rd	200 m	20.26
2026	European Championships	Birmingham, United Kingdom	–	4 × 100 m relay	DQ

^{1}Did not finish in the final

=== National titles ===
Desalu won six national championships at individual senior level.

- Italian Athletics Championships
  - 100 m: 2025 (1)
  - 200 m: 2016, 2017, 2021, 2024, 2025 (5)

== See also ==
- List of European records in athletics
- List of Italian records in athletics
- Italian all-time lists - 200 m
- Italian all-time lists - 4 × 100 m relay
- Italian national track relay team
