= Albert Komański =

Polish athlete (born 2000)

Personal information
- Nationality: Polish
- Born: 7 February 2000 (age 26)

Sport
- Sport: Athletics
- Event: Sprint

Achievements and titles
- Personal best: 200m: 20.49 (2023)
Medal record
Men's athletics
Representing Poland
European Games
Silver medal – second place	2023 Kraków-Małopolska	200 m

Albert Komański (born 7 February 2000) is a Polish sprinter. He was Polish national indoors champion over 200 metres in 2023.

== Career ==
He became Polish national indoors champion in 2023, running 20.56 seconds for the 200 metres.

In June 2023, he lowered his 200 metres personal best to 20.49 seconds. He was a silver medalist over 200 metres at the 2023 European Team Championships in Silesia.

He competed at the 2023 World Athletics Championships in Budapest.

In June 2024, he was a semi finalist in the 200 metres at the 2024 European Athletics Championships in Rome. He competed in the 200m at the 2024 Paris Olympics.
