= Ondřej Macík =

Czech athlete (born 2001)

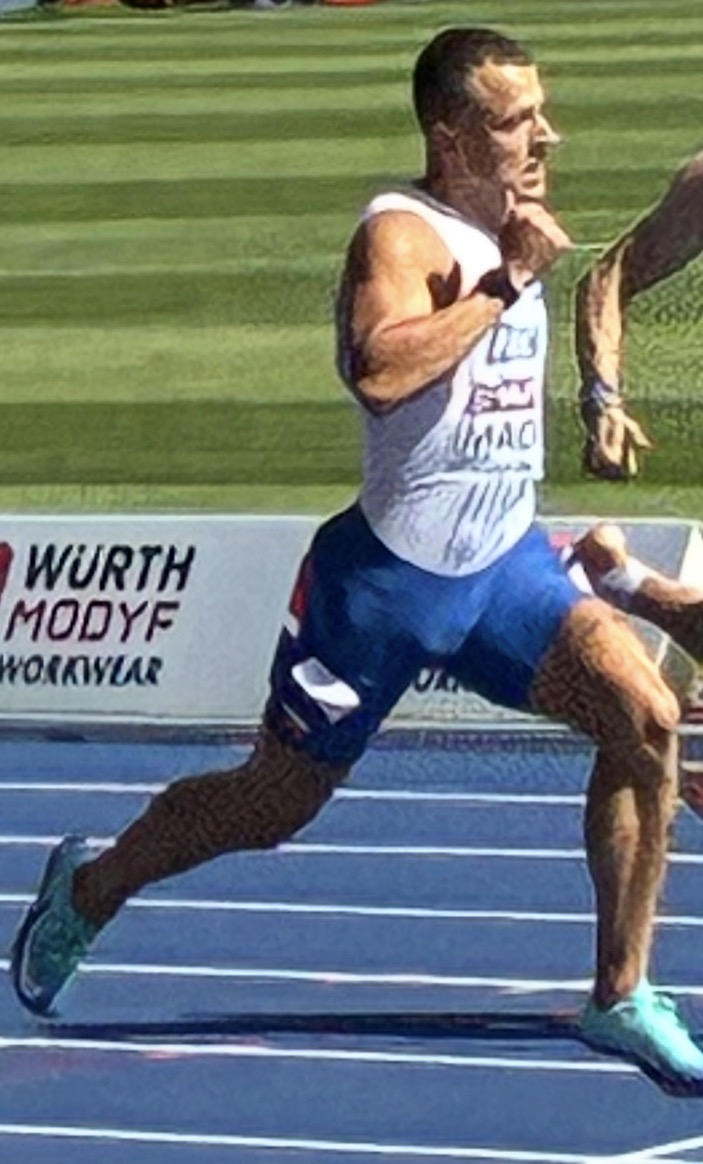
- Macík in 2026

Personal information
- Nationality: Czech
- Born: 12 January 2001 (age 25)

Sport
- Sport: Athletics
- Event: Sprint

Achievements and titles
- Personal bests: 200m: 20.39 (Tábor, 2023)

Ondřej Macík (born 12 January 2001) is a track and field athlete from the Czech Republic who competes as a sprinter. In 2023, he became Czech national champion over 200 metres both indoor and outdoor, and became the Czech national record holder over 200 metres outdoors. He competed at the 2024 Olympic Games.

== Biography ==
Macík was inspired to take up athletics after watching Pavel Maslák at the 2015 European Athletics Indoor Championships in Prague. Macík trains with Dukla Prague, whose members include Olympic snowboard cross champion Eva Adamczyková.

In June 2023 Macík was a finalist at the European Athletics U23 Championships in Espoo, Finland. In July 2023, he broke the Czech national record for the 200 metres, running 20.39 in Tábor.

Competing at the 2023 World Athletics Championships in Budapest, Hungary in August 2023, he reached the semifinals with a run of 20.40 seconds in the qualifying heats. In November 2023, he was pronounced Newcomer athlete (track and field) of the year within Czechia and placed eleventh overall in the vote for all athletes.

He ran as part of the Czech 4 × 100 m relay team at the 2024 World Relays Championships in Nassau, Bahamas. He competed in the 200m at the 2024 Paris Olympics where he ran 21.03 in his qualifying heat and 21.-4 seconds in the repechage round, but did not progress to the semi-finals.

He finished runner-up over 200 metres at the Czech Indoor Athletics Championships in Ostrava in February 2025, running a time of 20.79 seconds to finish behind Tomáš Němejc. In June 2025, he was part of the Czech men's 4 x 100 metres relay team which set a new senior national record, whilst competing at the 2025 European Athletics Team Championships First Division in Madrid; running 38.59 seconds alongside Zdeněk Stromšík, Eduard Kubelík and Němejc.

In August 2026, he competed at the 2026 European Athletics Championships in Birmingham, England in the 200 metres.
