= Diego Pettorossi =

Italian sprinter

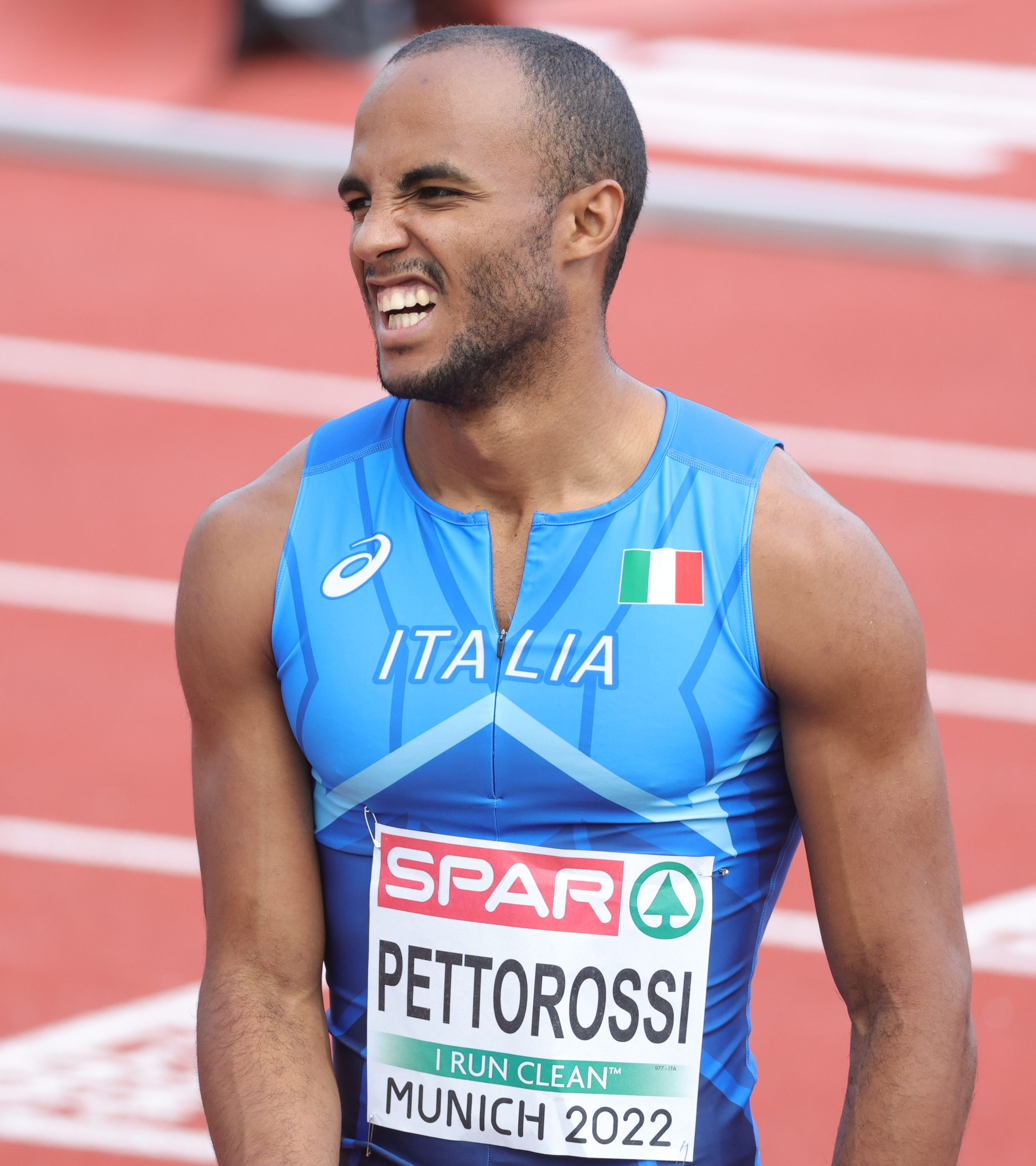
- Pettorossi in 2022

Personal information
- National team: Italy
- Born: 13 January 1997 (age 29) Bologna, Italy
- Height: 1.87 m (6 ft 2 in)
- Weight: 79 kg (174 lb)

Sport
- Sport: Athletics
- Event: Sprinting
- Club: Libertas Unicusano Livorno
- Coached by: Leonardo Righi

Achievements and titles
- Personal bests: 100 m: 10.36 (2022); 200 m: 20.54 (2022)
Medal record
Mediterranean Games
Gold medal – first place	2022 Oran	4×100 m relay
Silver medal – second place	2022 Oran	200 m

Diego Aldo Pettorossi (born 13 January 1997) is an Italian sprinter.

== Biography ==
Born in Bologna to an Ivorian father, adopted by an Italian family from Marche, and to a Sardinian mother from Alghero. He started playing basketball in Bologna, and took up athletics by joining Cus Bologna when he was 14.

== Achievements ==
Year	Competition	Venue	Rank	Event	Time	Notes
2022	Mediterranean Games	(Algeria) Oran	2nd	200 m	20.65	
2022	Mediterranean Games	(Algeria) Oran	1st	4×100 m relay	38.95	SB

== National titles ==
Pettorossi won a national championships at individual senior level.

- Italian Athletics Championships
  - 200 m: 2022

== See also ==
- Italian national track relay team
