= Eduard Kubelík =

Czech athlete (born 2002)

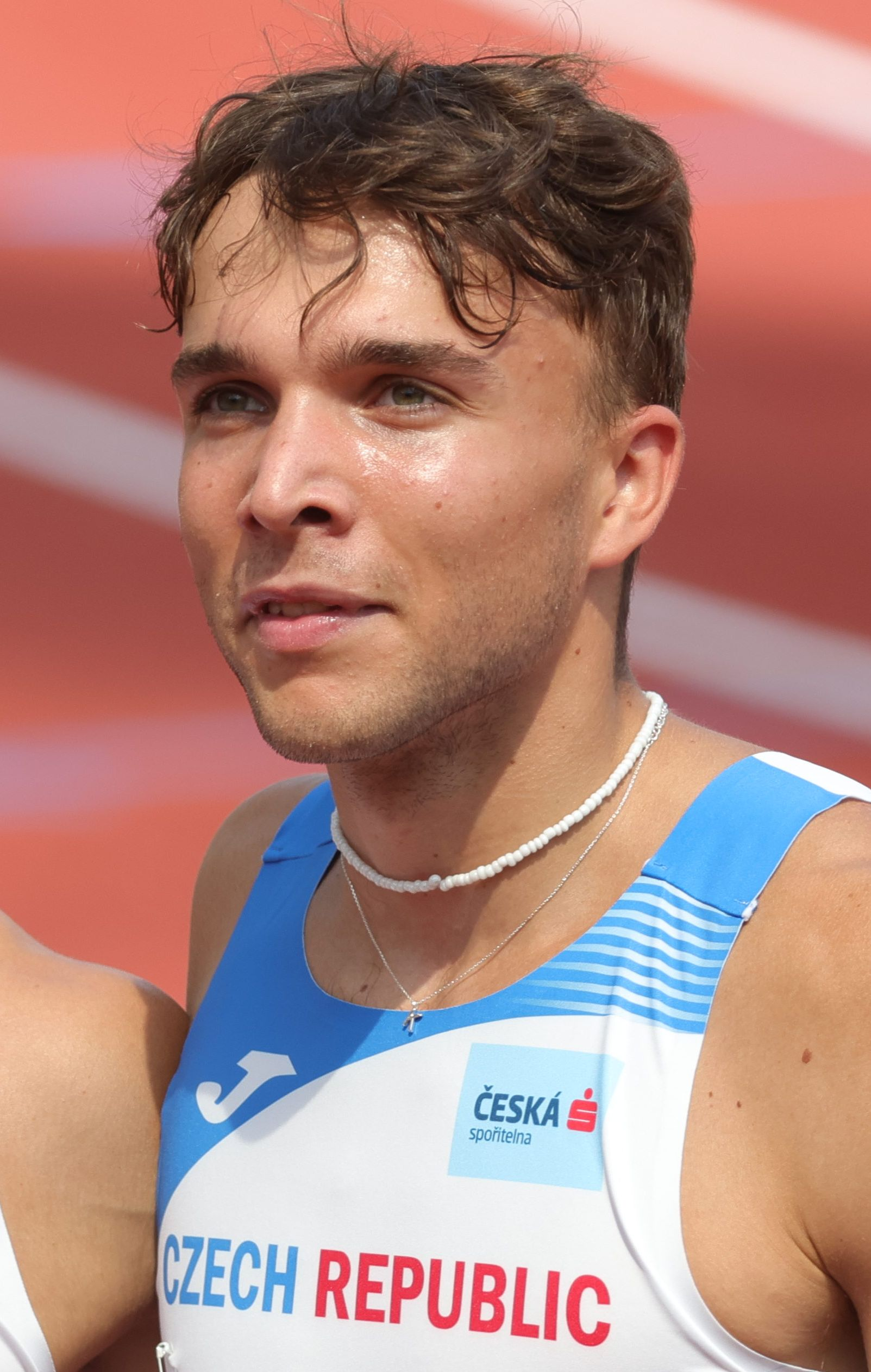
- Kubelík in 2022

Personal information
- Born: 8 October 2002 (age 23) Dačice, Czech Republic

Sport
- Sport: Athletics
- Event: Sprint

Achievements and titles
- Personal bests: 200m: 20.51 (Tabor, 2023)
Medal record
Men's athletics
Representing Czech Republic
European U20 Championships
Silver medal – second place	2021 Tallinn	200 m

Eduard Kubelík (born 8 October 2002) is a Czech sprinter. He has won national titles at the Czech Indoor Athletics Championships over 200 metres. He has represented the Czech Republic at multiple major championships, including the 2024 Olympic Games.

== Personal life ==
Eduard Kubelík was born on 8 October 2002 in Dačice.

== Career ==
He won the Czech Indoor Athletics Championships title in Ostrava in February 2020 running 21.26 seconds for the 200 metres.

He was a silver medalist over 200 metres at the 2021 European Athletics U20 Championships in Tallinn, Estonia, in a time of 20.82 seconds.

He won the Czech national indoors title for a second time in Ostrava in March 2022 running 21.02 seconds for the 200 metres. In June 2022, he finished third in the 100 metres at the Czech Athletics Championships in a time of 10.39 seconds. He competed over 200 metres at the 2022 European Athletics Championships in Munich, Germany, where he ran 21.25 seconds but did not progress to the semi-final.

He competed at the 2023 European Athletics U23 Championships in Espoo, Finland. He ran a personal best 20.51 seconds for the 200 metres in July 2023 at the Czech Athletics Championships as he finished runner-up. He also placed third in the 100 metres final.

He competed at the 2024 European Athletics Championships in Rome, Italy where he ran 20.91 seconds to qualify for the semi-finals. He competed in the 200m at the 2024 Olympics Games in Paris, France. He ran 21.20 seconds in the repechage round and did not qualify for the semi-finals.

In June 2025, he was part of the Czech men's 4 x 100 metres relay team which set a new senior national record, whilst competing at the 2025 European Athletics Team Championships First Division in Madrid; running 38.59 seconds alongside Zdeněk Stromšík, Tomáš Němejc, and Ondřej Macík.
