= List of African under-23 records in athletics =

The African U23 records in the sport of athletics are the all-time best marks set in competition by an athlete who competes for a member nation of the Confederation of African Athletics (CAA) by aged 22 or younger throughout the entire calendar year of the performance. Technically, in all under-23 age divisions, the age is calculated "on December 31 of the year of competition" to avoid age group switching during a competitive season. CAA doesn't maintain an official list for such performances. All bests shown on this list are tracked by statisticians not officially sanctioned by the governing body.

== Outdoor ==
=== Men ===
| Event | Record | Athlete | Nationality | Date | Meet | Place | Age | Ref. |
|---|---|---|---|---|---|---|---|---|
| 60 m | 6.58 A (−1.8 m/s) | Bayanda Walaza | South Africa | 8 February 2025 | Curro Podium Grand Finale & Simbine Classic Shootout | Pretoria, South Africa | 18 years, 365 days | |
| 100 m | 9.85 (+1.7 m/s) | Olusoji Fasuba | Nigeria | 12 May 2006 | | Doha, Qatar | 21 years, 307 days | |
| 150 m (straight) | 16.30 (±0.0 m/s) | Favour Ofili | Nigeria | 18 May 2024 | Atlanta City Games | Atlanta, United States | 21 years, 139 days | |
| 200 m | 19.50 (+1.6 m/s) | Letsile Tebogo | Botswana | 23 July 2023 | Anniversary Games | London, United Kingdom | 20 years, 46 days | |
| 300 m | 30.69 A | Letsile Tebogo | Botswana | 17 February 2024 | Simbine Curro Classic Shoot-Out | Pretoria, South Africa | 20 years, 255 days | |
| 400 m | 43.91 A | Muzala Samukonga | Zambia | 29 April 2023 | Botswana Golden Grand Prix | Gaborone, Botswana | 20 years, 141 days | |
| 800 m | 1:41.01 | David Rudisha | Kenya | 29 August 2010 | Rieti Meeting | Rieti, Italy | 21 years, 255 days | |
| 1000 m | 2:11.83 | Emmanuel Wanyonyi | Kenya | 10 July 2026 | Herculis | Fontvieille, Monaco | 21 years, 343 days | |
| 1500 m | 3:27.72 | Phanuel Koech | Kenya | 20 June 2025 | Meeting de Paris | Paris, France | 18 years, 201 days | |
| Mile | 3:43.40 | Noah Ngeny | Kenya | 7 July 1999 | Golden Gala (an IAAF Golden League event) | Rome, Italy | 20 years, 247 days | |
| Mile (road) | 3:52.45 | Emmanuel Wanyonyi | Kenya | 26 April 2025 | Adizero: Road to Records | Herzogenaurach, Germany | 20 years, 268 days | |
| 2000 m | 4:48.14 | Reynold Cheruiyot | Kenya | 8 September 2023 | Memorial Van Damme | Brussels, Belgium | 19 years, 40 days | |
| 3000 m | 7:20.67 | Daniel Komen | Kenya | 1 September 1996 | Rieti Meeting | Rieti, Italy | 20 years, 107 days | |
| 5000 m | 12:37.35 | Kenenisa Bekele | Ethiopia | 31 May 2004 | Fanny Blankers-Koen Games | Hengelo, Netherlands | 21 years, 353 days | |
| 5 km (road) | 12:49 | Berihu Aregawi | Ethiopia | 31 December 2021 | Cursa dels Nassos | Barcelona, Spain | 20 years, 306 days | |
| 10,000 m | 26:20.31 | Kenenisa Bekele | Ethiopia | 8 June 2004 | Golden Spike Ostrava | Ostrava, Czech Republic | 21 years, 361 days | |
| 10 km (road) | 26:24 | Rhonex Kipruto | Kenya | 12 January 2020 | 10k Valencia Ibercaja | Valencia, Spain | 20 years, 105 days | |
| Half marathon | 57:31 | Jacob Kiplimo | Uganda | 21 November 2021 | Lisbon Half Marathon | Lisbon, Portugal | 21 years, 7 days | |
| Marathon | 2:04:23 | Ayele Abshero | Ethiopia | 27 January 2012 | Dubai Marathon | Dubai, United Arab Emirates | 21 years, 30 days | |
| 110 m hurdles | | | | | | | | |
| 400 m hurdles | | | | | | | | |
| 3000 m steeplechase | | | | | | | | |
| High jump | | | | | | | | |
| Pole vault | | | | | | | | |
| Long jump | | | | | | | | |
| Triple jump | | | | | | | | |
| Shot put | | | | | | | | |
| Discus throw | | | | | | | | |
| Hammer throw | | | | | | | | |
| Javelin throw | | | | | | | | |
| Decathlon | | | | | | | | |
| Decathlon | 100m (wind) / Long jump (wind) / Shot put / High jump / 400m / 110m H (wind) / Discus / Pole vault / Javelin / 1500m | | | | | | | |
| 10,000 m walk (track) | 38:04.09 A | Misgana Wakuma | Ethiopia | 28 March 2026 | Ethiopian Championships | Addis Ababa, Ethiopia | 21 years, 266 days | |
| 20 km walk (road) | | | | | | | | |
| 50 km walk (road) | | | | | | | | |
| 4 × 100 m relay | 38.51 A | Mihlali Xhotyeni; Sinesipho Dambile; Letlhogonolo Moleyane; Benjamin Richardson | South Africa | 22 August 2021 | World U20 Championships | Nairobi, Kenya | 21 years, 173 days | |
| 4 × 400 m relay | | | | | | | | |

=== Women ===
| Event | Record | Athlete | Nationality | Date | Meet | Place | Age | Ref. |
|---|---|---|---|---|---|---|---|---|
| 100 m | 10.93 (+2.0 m/s) | Favour Ofili | Nigeria | 30 April 2022 | LSU Invitational | Baton Rouge, United States | 19 years, 120 days | |
| 150 m (bend) | 17.67 A (−0.5 m/s) | Kayla la Grange | South Africa | 8 February 2025 | Curro Podium Grand Finale & Simbine Classic Shootout | Pretoria, South Africa | 20 years, 196 days | |
| 150 m (straight) | 16.30 (±0.0 m/s) | Favour Ofili | Nigeria | 18 May 2024 | Atlanta City Games | Atlanta, United States | 21 years, 139 days | |
| 200 m | 21.78 (+0.6 m/s) | Christine Mboma | Namibia | 9 September 2021 | Weltklasse Zürich | Zürich, Switzerland | 18 years, 110 days | |
| 300 m | 34.60 A | Beatrice Masilingi | Namibia | 18 February 2023 | Curro Simbine Classic Shoot Out | Pretoria, South Africa | 19 years, 314 days | |
| 400 m | 48.54 | Christine Mboma | Namibia | 30 June 2021 | Irena Szewińska Memorial | Bydgoszcz, Poland | 18 years, 39 days | |
| 800 m | 1:54.01 | Pamela Jelimo | Kenya | 29 August 2008 | Weltklasse Zürich | Zürich, Switzerland | 18 years, 268 days | |
| 1500 m | 3:56.98 | Faith Kipyegon | Kenya | 10 May 2013 | Qatar Athletic Super Grand Prix | Doha, Qatar | 19 years, 120 days | |
| Mile run | 4:14.79 | Freweyni Hailu | Ethiopia | 21 July 2023 | Herculis | Fontvieille, Monaco | 22 years, 159 days | |
| Mile (road) | 4:20.98 Wo | Diribe Welteji | Ethiopia | 1 October 2023 | World Road Running Championships | Riga, Latvia | 21 years, 141 days | |
| 2000 m | 5:25.86 | Freweyni Hailu | Ethiopia | 14 September 2021 | Hanžeković Memorial | Zagreb, Croatia | 20 years, 214 days | |
| 3000 m | | | | | | | | |
| Two miles | 9:20.81 | Alemitu Heroye | Ethiopia | 24 August 2014 | British Grand Prix | Birmingham, United Kingdom | 19 years, 107 days | |
| 5000 m | 14:06.62 | Letesenbet Gidey | Ethiopia | 7 October 2020 | | Valencia, Spain | 22 years, 201 days | |
| 5 km (road) | 14:15 Mx | Marta Alemayo | Ethiopia | 4 April 2026 | Urban Trail de Lille | Lille, France | 17 years, 361 days | |
| 5 km (road) | 14:25+ Wo | Agnes Ngetich | Kenya | 10 September 2023 | Brașov Running Festival | Brașov, Romania | 22 years, 230 days | |
| 10,000 m | | | | | | | | |
| 10 km (road) | 29:25 Mx | Medina Eisa | Ethiopia | 16 February 2025 | 10K Facsa Castellón | Castellón de la Plana, Spain | 20 years, 44 days | |
| 10 km (road) | 29:26 Wo | Agnes Ngetich | Kenya | 18 November 2023 | Urban Trail de Lille | Lille, France | 22 years, 299 days | |
| 10 km (road) | 29:24 Wo (Note: Ngetich's women's-only record was not certified after World Athletics determined the course was 25 meters too short.) | Agnes Ngetich | Kenya | 10 September 2023 | Brașov Running Festival | Brașov, Romania | 22 years, 230 days | |
| 10 miles (road) | 50:37 | Asayech Ayichew | Ethiopia | 12 April 2026 | Cherry Blossom Ten Mile Run | Washington, D.C., United States | 21 years, 9 days | |
| Half marathon | 1:03:51 | Yalemzerf Yehualaw | Ethiopia | 24 October 2021 | Valencia Half Marathon | Valencia, Spain | 22 years, 82 days | |
| Marathon | 2:17:36 | Tadu Teshome | Ethiopia | 4 December 2022 | Valencia Marathon | Valencia, Spain | 21 years, 178 days | |
| 100 m hurdles | | | | | | | | |
| 200 m hurdles (straight) | 26.16 (+0.3 m/s) | Zeney van der Walt | South Africa | 16 June 2019 | Adidas Boost Boston Games | Boston, United States | 19 years, 25 days | |
| 300 m hurldes | 43.18 A | Lenka du Toit | South Africa | 8 February 2025 | Curro Podium Grand Finale & Simbine Classic Shootout | Pretoria, South Africa | 13 years, 346 days | |
| 400 m hurdles | | | | | | | | |
| Mile steeplechase | 4:52.10 | Celestine Jepkosgei Biwot | Kenya | 22 August 2025 | Memorial Van Damme | Brussels, Belgium | 21 years, 241 days | |
| 2000 m steeplechase | 6:02.04 | Celestine Biwot | Kenya | 18 June 2023 | Czeslaw Cybulski Memorial | Poznań, Poland | 19 years, 176 days | |
| 3000 m steeplechase | 8:58.78 | Celliphine Chepteek Chespol | Kenya | 26 May 2017 | Prefontaine Classic | Eugene, United States | 18 years, 338 days | |
| High jump | | | | | | | | |
| Pole vault | 4.50 m | Ansume de Beer | South Africa | 30 June 2026 | Fribourg International Meeting | Fribourg, Switzerland | 19 years, 6 days | |
| Long jump | | | | | | | | |
| Triple jump | | | | | | | | |
| Shot put | | | | | | | | |
| Discus throw | | | | | | | | |
| Hammer throw | 63.91 m | Annette Echikunwoke | Nigeria | 14 April 2017 | Cincinnati All-Ohio Championships | Cincinnati, United States | 20 years, 259 days | |
| Javelin throw | | | | | | | | |
| Heptathlon | | | | | | | | |
| Heptathlon | 100m H (wind) / High jump / Shot put / 200m (wind) / Long jump (wind) / Javelin / 800m | | | | | | | |
| 10,000 m walk (track) | 45:54.90 | Chahinez Nasri | Tunisia | 4 June 2016 | Mediterranean U23 Championships | Radès, Tunisia | 20 years, 1 day | |
| 20 km walk (road) | | | | | | | | |
| 4 × 100 m relay | | | | | | | | |
| 4 × 400 m relay | | | | | | | | |

== Indoor ==
=== Men ===
| Event | Record | Athlete | Nationality | Date | Meet | Place | Age | Ref. |
|---|---|---|---|---|---|---|---|---|
| 60 m | 6.45 | Kayinsola Ajayi | Nigeria | 26 February 2026 | SEC Championships | College Station, United Station | 21 years, 165 days | |
| 60 m | 6.45 | Kayinsola Ajayi | Nigeria | 14 March 2026 | NCAA Division I Championships | Fayetteville, United States | 21 years, 181 days | |
| 200 m | 20.17 A | Udodi Onwuzurike | Nigeria | 10 March 2023 | NCAA Division I Championships | Albuquerque, United States | 20 years, 40 days | |
| 200 m | 20.17 A | Tarsis Orogot | Uganda | 10 March 2023 | NCAA Division I Championships | Albuquerque, United States | 20 years, 106 days | |
| 400 m | 44.57 | Samuel Ogazi | Nigeria | 14 March 2026 | NCAA Division I Championships | Fayetteville, United States | 19 years, 304 days | |
| 600 y | 1:06.93 | Moitalel Naadokila | Kenya | 15 February 2020 | Texas Tech Shootout | Lubbock, United States | 19 years, 7 days | |
| 800 m | | | | | | | | |
| 1000 m | 2:15.26 | Noureddine Morceli | Algeria | 22 February 1992 | Indoor Meeting Karlsruhe | Birmingham, United Kingdom | 21 years, 359 days | |
| 1500 m | 3:31.04 | Samuel Tefera | Ethiopia | 16 February 2019 | Birmingham Indoor Grand Prix | Birmingham, United Kingdom | 19 years, 116 days | |
| Mile | 3:47.01 | Yomif Kejelcha | Ethiopia | 3 March 2019 | Bruce Lehane Invitational | Boston, United States | 21 years, 214 days | |
| 2000 m | 4:56.30 | Augustine Kiprono Choge | Kenya | 9 February 2007 | | Aubiére, France | 20 years, 19 days | |
| 3000 m | 7:24.90 | Daniel Komen | Kenya | 6 February 1998 | Samsung Cup | Budapest, Hungary | 21 years, 265 days | |
| 5000 m | 12:49.60 | Kenenisa Bekele | Ethiopia | 20 February 2004 | Birmingham Indoor Grand Prix | Birmingham, United Kingdom | 21 years, 252 days | |
| 60 m hurdles | | | | | | | | |
| High jump | | | | | | | | |
| Pole vault | | | | | | | | |
| Long jump | | | | | | | | |
| Triple jump | 17.12 m | Yasser Triki | Algeria | 23 February 2019 | SEC Championships | Fayetteville, United States | 21 years, 336 days | |
| Shot put | | | | | | | | |
| Heptathlon | | | | | | | | |
| Heptathlon | 60m / Long jump / Shot put / High jump / 60m H / Pole vault / 1000m | | | | | | | |
| 5000 m walk | | | | | | | | |
| 4 × 400 m relay | | | | | | | | |

=== Women ===
| Event | Record | Athlete | Nationality | Date | Meet | Place | Age | Ref. |
|---|---|---|---|---|---|---|---|---|
| 55 m | 6.58 | Beatrice Utondu-Okoye | Nigeria | 11 February 1990 | | Monroe, United States | 20 years, 80 days | |
| 60 m | | | | | | | | |
| 200 m | 22.11 A | Favour Ofili | Nigeria | 10 March 2023 | NCAA Division I Championships | Albuquerque, United States | 20 years, 69 days | |
| 400 m | 50.28 | Ella Onojuvwevwo | Nigeria | 13 March 2026 | NCAA Division I Championships | Fayetteville, United States | 20 years, 353 days | |
| 800 m | | | | | | | | |
| 1500 m | 3:55.47 | Diribe Welteji | Ethiopia | 6 February 2024 | Copernicus Cup | Toruń, Spain | 21 years, 269 days | |
| 2000 m | 5:34.51 | Kena Tufa | Ethiopia | 19 February 2026 | Meeting Hauts-de-France Pas-de-Calais | Liévin, France | 20 years, 54 days | |
| 3000 m | 8:23.74 | Meselech Melkamu | Ethiopia | 3 February 2007 | Sparkassen Cup | Stuttgart, Germany | 21 years, 290 days | |
| Two miles | 9:07.12 | Melknat Wudu | Ethiopia | 11 February 2024 | Millrose Games | New York City, United States | 19 years, 39 days | |
| Two miles | 9:04.39 (Note: later disqualified due to lane infringement) | Medina Eisa | Ethiopia | 11 February 2024 | Millrose Games | New York City, United States | 19 years, 39 days | |
| 60 m hurdles | | | | | | | | |
| High jump | | | | | | | | |
| Pole vault | | | | | | | | |
| Long jump | | | | | | | | |
| Triple jump | | | | | | | | |
| Shot put | 18.50 m | Jessica Oji | Nigeria | 1 March 2026 | Ivy League Championships | New York City, United States | 19 years, 62 days | |
| Weight throw | 25.13 m | Anthonett Nabwe | Liberia | 13 March 2026 | NCAA Division I Championships | Fayetteville, United States | 22 years, 54 days | |
| Pentathlon | | | | | | | | |
| Pentathlon | 60m H / High jump / Shot put / Long jump / 800m | | | | | | | |
| 3000 m walk | | | | | | | | |
| 4 × 400 m relay | | | | | | | | |
