= 2022 World Athletics Championships – Men's 200 metres =

Men's 200 metres at the 2022 World Championships
- Venue: Hayward Field
- Dates: 18 July (heats); 19 July (semi-finals); 21 July (final)
- Competitors: 55 from 33 nations
- Winning time: 19.31

Medalists
gold medal	Noah Lyles	United States
silver medal	Kenny Bednarek	United States
bronze medal	Erriyon Knighton	United States

Video on YouTube Official Video

The men's 200 metres at the 2022 World Athletics Championships was held at the Hayward Field in Eugene from 18 to 21 July 2022. The winning margin was 0.46 seconds.

== Summary ==
A cramp in the semi-final round quashed Fred Kerley's bid to win a medal in all three sprint events. The Olympic Gold Medalist Andre De Grasse did not start in the heats, #2 of all time Yohan Blake did not start the semi-final round. The world leader coming into this was 18-year-old Erriyon Knighton with a 19.49. Alexander Ogando set a national record to win heat 1, Knighton won heat 3 and defending champion Noah Lyles won semi 2 ahead of the next fastest qualifier Kenny Bednarek, putting those four in the center of the track for the final. The first six qualifiers ran under 20 in the semis.

In the final, Knighton had lane 3, Ogando 4, Bednarek 5 and Lyles 6. In the past Lyles had been slow to start, depending on his superior top end speed to win at the end. That strategy also resulted in him "only" getting the bronze medal in the Olympics. Here, Lyles was fast at the start, making up the stagger on also notoriously slow starting Joseph Fahnbulleh just past the halfway point in the turn. Only Bednarek was able to stay close. Coming onto the straightaway, Lyles was up a metre on Bednarek who had another metre on Knighton. Lyles turned on the top end jets and pulled away. Knighton also accelerated, closing on Bednarek, while holding off the fast close of Fahnbulleh for the bronze.

Lyles 19.31 broke Michael Johnson's American Record set winning the 1996 Olympics to become the third fastest 200 runner of all time. Additionally, bronze medalist Knighton became the youngest medalist in the 200 metres in Championship history. It was the third sweep on home soil for the American team. Prior to these Championships, no Men's team had a sweep since 2015.

== Records ==
Before the competition records were as follows:

Record	Athlete & Nat.	Perf.	Location	Date
World record	Usain Bolt (JAM)	19.19	Berlin, Germany	20 August 2009
Championship record	Usain Bolt (JAM)	19.19	Berlin, Germany	20 August 2009
World Leading	Erriyon Knighton (USA)	19.49	Baton Rouge, United States	30 April 2022
African Record	Frank Fredericks (NAM)	19.68	Atlanta, United States	1 August 1996
Asian Record	Xie Zhenye (CHN)	19.88	London, Great Britain	21 July 2019
North, Central American and Caribbean record	Usain Bolt (JAM)	19.19	Berlin, Germany	20 August 2009
South American Record	Alonso Edward (PAN)	19.81	Berlin, Germany	20 August 2009
European Record	Pietro Mennea (ITA)	19.72	Mexico City, Mexico	12 September 1979
Oceanian record	Peter Norman (AUS)	20.06	Mexico City, Mexico	16 October 1968

== Qualification standard ==
The standard to qualify automatically for entry was 20.24.

== Schedule ==
The event schedule, in local time (UTC−7), was as follows:

Date	Time	Round
18 July	17:05	Heats
19 July	18:50	Semi-finals
21 July	19:50	Final

== Results ==
=== Heats ===
The first 3 athletes in each heat (Q) and the next 3 fastest (q) qualify for the semi-finals.

Wind:
Heat 1: +1.0 m/s, Heat 2: 0.0 m/s, Heat 3: +2.1 m/s, Heat 4: +0.5 m/s, Heat 5: +0.4 m/s, Heat 6: +1.0 m/s, Heat 7: -0.3 m/s

Rank	Heat	Name	Nationality	Time	Notes
1	7	Noah Lyles	United States	19.98	Q
2	4	Alexander Ogando	Dominican Republic	20.01	Q, NR
2	3	Erriyon Knighton	United States	20.01	Q
4	3	Luxolo Adams	South Africa	20.10	Q
5	3	Nethaneel Mitchell-Blake	Great Britain & N.I.	20.11	Q
6	1	Joseph Fahnbulleh	Liberia	20.12	Q
7	3	Yancarlos Martínez	Dominican Republic	20.13	q
8	5	Fred Kerley	United States	20.17	Q
9	6	Filippo Tortu	Italy	20.18	Q
10	1	Koki Ueyama	Japan	20.26	Q, PB
11	5	Sinesipho Dambile	South Africa	20.29	Q, PB
12	7	Rasheed Dwyer	Jamaica	20.29	Q
13	1	Jerome Blake	Canada	20.30	Q
14	7	Xie Zhenye	China	20.30	Q
15	1	Joe Ferguson	Great Britain & N.I.	20.33	q
16	5	Udodi Onwuzurike	Nigeria	20.34	Q
17	2	Jereem Richards	Trinidad and Tobago	20.35	Q
18	4	Kenny Bednarek	United States	20.35	Q
19	5	Yohan Blake	Jamaica	20.35	q
20	1	Joseph Amoah	Ghana	20.40	SB
21	6	Guy Maganga Gorra	Gabon	20.44	Q, NR
22	4	Tarsis Orogot	Uganda	20.44	Q
23	6	Calab Law	Australia	20.50	Q, PB
24	7	Owen Ansah	Germany	20.52	
25	7	Eric Harrison Jr.	Trinidad and Tobago	20.54	
26	3	Akeem Bloomfield	Jamaica	20.56	
27	2	Aaron Brown	Canada	20.60	Q
28	6	Adam Gemili	Great Britain & N.I.	20.60	
29	3	Sibusiso Matsenjwa	Eswatini	20.60	
30	4	Fausto Desalu	Italy	20.63	
31	7	Lucas Vilar	Brazil	20.65	SB
32	5	William Reais	Switzerland	20.71	SB
33	2	Shota Iizuka	Japan	20.72	Q
34	3	Tinotenda Matiyenga	Zimbabwe	20.72	
35	7	Jan Jirka	Czech Republic	20.73	
36	5	Aidan Murphy	Australia	20.75	
37	2	Shaun Maswanganyi	South Africa	20.79	
38	2	Simon Hansen	Denmark	20.80	
39	2	Shainer Rengifo Montoya	Cuba	20.80	
40	4	Mouhamadou Fall	France	20.83	
41	1	Lucas Rodrigues da Silva	Brazil	20.90	
42	4	Hachim Maaroufou	Comoros	20.91	
43	2	Joseph Green	Guam	22.04	
44	6	Alonso Edward	Panama	22.08	
	4	Marcos Santos	Angola		DQ
	1	Terrence Talio	Papua New Guinea		DQ
	6	Andre de Grasse	Canada		DNS
	5	Emmanuel Eseme	Cameroon		DNS
	6	Yuki Koike	Japan		DNS

=== Semi-finals ===
The first 2 athletes in each heat (Q) and the next 2 fastest (q) qualify for the final.

Wind:
Heat 1: -0.1 m/s, Heat 2: +1.1 m/s, Heat 3: +0.3 m/s

Rank	Heat	Name	Nationality	Time	Notes
1	2	Noah Lyles	United States	19.62	Q
2	3	Erriyon Knighton	United States	19.77	Q
3	2	Kenny Bednarek	United States	19.84	Q, SB
4	2	Jereem Richards	Trinidad and Tobago	19.86	q
5	1	Alexander Ogando	Dominican Republic	19.91	Q, NR
6	1	Joseph Fahnbulleh	Liberia	19.92	Q
7	2	Luxolo Adams	South Africa	20.09	q
8	3	Aaron Brown	Canada	20.10	Q
9	3	Filippo Tortu	Italy	20.10	PB
10	3	Yancarlos Martínez	Dominican Republic	20.21	SB
11	1	Jerome Blake	Canada	20.29	
12	1	Nethaneel Mitchell-Blake	Great Britain & N.I.	20.30	
13	2	Tarsis Orogot	Uganda	20.35	
14	2	Udodi Onwuzurike	Nigeria	20.39	
15	3	Xie Zhenye	China	20.41	
16	1	Sinesipho Dambile	South Africa	20.47	
17	3	Koki Ueyama	Japan	20.48	
18	2	Joe Ferguson	Great Britain & N.I.	20.52	
19	2	Guy Maganga Gorra	Gabon	20.65	
20	1	Fred Kerley	United States	20.68	
21	3	Calab Law	Australia	20.72	
22	1	Shota Iizuka	Japan	20.77	
23	3	Rasheed Dwyer	Jamaica	20.87	
	1	Yohan Blake	Jamaica		DNS

=== Final ===
The final was started at 19:50 on 21 July. The results were as follows:

Wind: +0.4 m/s

Rank	Lane	Name	Nationality	Time	Notes
1st place, gold medalist(s)	6	Noah Lyles	United States	19.31	WL NR
2nd place, silver medalist(s)	5	Kenny Bednarek	United States	19.77	SB
3rd place, bronze medalist(s)	3	Erriyon Knighton	United States	19.80	
4	7	Joseph Fahnbulleh	Liberia	19.84	
5	4	Alexander Ogando	Dominican Republic	19.93	
6	2	Jereem Richards	Trinidad and Tobago	20.08	
7	8	Aaron Brown	Canada	20.18	
8	1	Luxolo Adams	South Africa	20.47	
