= 2023 World Athletics Championships – Men's 200 metres =

Men's 200 metres at the 2023 World Championships
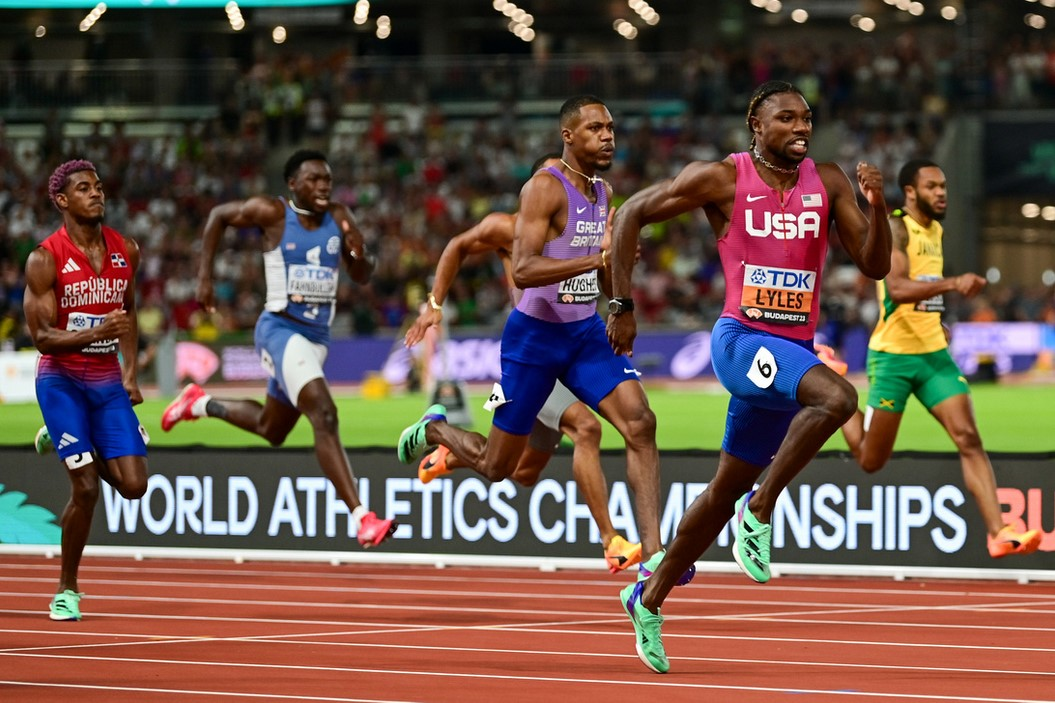
- Final of the event
- Venue: National Athletics Centre
- Dates: 23 August (heats); 24 August (semi-finals); 25 August (final)
- Winning time: 19.52

Medalists
gold medal	Noah Lyles	United States
silver medal	Erriyon Knighton	United States
bronze medal	Letsile Tebogo	Botswana

The men's 200 metres at the 2023 World Athletics Championships was held at the National Athletics Centre in Budapest from 23 to 25 August 2023. The winning margin was 0.23 seconds.

== Summary ==
As the carts were bringing the semi-finalists to the track from the warm-up area, one cart T-boned the other. Andrew Hudson received minor injuries with broken glass getting into his eye. The first semi was moved to last in the order to give Hudson and the other athletes a chance to recover. A relaxed defending champion Noah Lyles came through as the #1 qualifier. Hudson finished fourth in the semi-final, but was granted the extra lane in the final.

In the final, the start was fairly even, with the exception of Joseph Fahnbulleh's notoriously slow start, accentuated by Hudson's fast start in lane 1 next to him. As they were beginning to exit the turn, the three Americans, Lyles, Erriyon Knighton, and Kenny Bednarek, along with Letsile Tebogo all on the outside of the tracking Zharnel Hughes, were still even. With Lyles' notorious closing speed, that was bad news for the other competitors. From there, true to form, Lyles opened a gap that continued to widen to the finish. The next two runners to gain separation were the youngsters, 19 year old Knighton, then 20 year old Tebogo. Lyles had 3 metres over Knighton at the finish. Knighton was barely a metre clear of Tebogo. Lyles' 19.52 winning time equalled the #14 time in history, tied with two previous efforts from Lyles (but he's also run faster on four other occasions). Knighton's 19.75 means he owns all of the top 12 times ever run by a U20 athlete. This World Championship title was a three-peat for Lyles and completed the second leg of his pre-meet announced plan to take three gold medals.

== Records ==
Before the competition records were as follows:

Record	Athlete & Nat.	Perf.	Location	Date
World record	Usain Bolt (JAM)	19.19	Berlin, Germany	20 August 2009
Championship record	Usain Bolt (JAM)	19.19	Berlin, Germany	20 August 2009
World Leading	Noah Lyles (USA)	19.47	London, United Kingdom	23 July 2023
African Record	Letsile Tebogo (BOT)	19.50	London, United Kingdom	23 July 2023
Asian Record	Xie Zhenye (CHN)	19.88	London, United Kingdom	21 July 2019
European Record	Pietro Mennea (ITA)	19.72	Mexico City, Mexico	12 September 1979
North, Central American and Caribbean record	Usain Bolt (JAM)	19.19	Berlin, Germany	20 August 2009
Oceanian record	Peter Norman (AUS)	20.06	Mexico City, Mexico	16 October 1968
South American Record	Alonso Edward (PAN)	19.81	Berlin, Germany	20 August 2009

== Qualification standard ==
The standard to qualify automatically for entry was 20.16 seconds.

== Schedule ==
The event schedule, in local time (UTC+2), was as follows:

Date	Time	Round
23 August	12:15	Heats
24 August	20:20	Semi-finals
25 August	21:50	Final

== Results ==
=== Round 1 (heats) ===
Round 1 took place on 23 August. The first 3 athletes in each heat ( Q ) and the next 3 fastest ( q ) qualified for the semi-final.

==== Heat 1 ====
Rank	Lane	Athlete	Nation	Time	Notes
1	4	Zharnel Hughes	Great Britain & N.I.	19.99	Q
2	2	Aaron Brown	Canada	20.08	Q
3	5	Luxolo Adams	South Africa	20.15	Q, SB
4	8	Shota Iizuka	Japan	20.27	q, SB
5	7	Taymir Burnet	Netherlands	20.31	q, PB
6	3	Eseosa Desalu	Italy	20.49	SB
7	6	Gediminas Truskauskas	Lithuania	20.90	
8	9	Franko Burraj	Albania	21.52	
				Wind: 0.0 m/s	

==== Heat 2 ====
Rank	Lane	Athlete	Nation	Time	Notes
1	8	Noah Lyles	United States	20.05	Q
2	4	Andrew Hudson	Jamaica	20.25	Q
3	9	Ondřej Macík	Czech Republic	20.40	Q
4	3	Tapiwanashe Makarawu	Zimbabwe	20.64	
5	5	Ján Volko	Slovakia	20.69	
6	2	Jorge Vides	Brazil	20.80	
7	1	Ko Seung-hwan	South Korea	21.09	
8	6	Leroy Kamau	Papua New Guinea	21.18	
9	7	Jessy Franco	Gibraltar	22.04	
				Wind: -0.1 m/s	

==== Heat 3 ====
Rank	Lane	Athlete	Nation	Time	Notes
1	7	Letsile Tebogo	Botswana	20.22	Q
2	5	Joseph Fahnbulleh	Liberia	20.42	Q
3	9	William Reais	Switzerland	20.50	Q
4	3	Joshua Hartmann	Germany	20.51	
5	2	Blessing Akwasi Afrifah	Israel	20.73	
6	6	Aidan Murphy	Australia	20.90	
7	4	Marcos Santos	Angola	21.05	NR
8	8	Hachim Maaroufou	Comoros	21.29	
				Wind: -1.4 m/s	

==== Heat 4 ====
Rank	Lane	Athlete	Nation	Time	Notes
1	8	Brendon Rodney	Canada	20.14	Q, SB
2	6	Renan Correa	Brazil	20.44	Q
3	2	Shaun Maswanganyi	South Africa	20.56	Q
4	5	Koki Ueyama	Japan	20.66	
5	3	Nadale Buntin	Saint Kitts and Nevis	20.90 [.894]	
5	4	Zoltán Wahl	Hungary	20.90 [.894]	
7	7	Mohamed Obaid Alsadi	Oman	21.39	
—	9	James Dadzie	Ghana	DNF	
				Wind: -0.2 m/s	

==== Heat 5 ====
Rank	Lane	Athlete	Nation	Time	Notes
1	8	Towa Uzawa	Japan	20.34	Q
2	7	Courtney Lindsey	United States	20.39	Q
3	3	Rasheed Dwyer	Jamaica	20.40	Q
4	5	Tarsis Gracious Orogot	Uganda	20.44	q
5	4	Yang Chun-han	Chinese Taipei	20.82	
6	9	Ramil Guliyev	Turkey	20.89	
7	6	Mindia Endeladze	Georgia	21.20	
—	2	Emmanuel Eseme	Cameroon	DNS	
				Wind: -0.2 m/s	

==== Heat 6 ====
Rank	Lane	Athlete	Nation	Time	Notes
1	9	Erriyon Knighton	United States	20.17	Q
2	7	Andre De Grasse	Canada	20.28	Q
3	8	Sinesipho Dambile	South Africa	20.34	Q
4	3	Filippo Tortu	Italy	20.46	
5	6	Joseph Amoah	Ghana	20.56	
6	5	Sibusiso Matsenjwa	Eswatini	20.88	
7	2	Guy Maganga Gorra	Gabon	21.04	
8	4	Yeykell Eliuth Romero	Nicaragua	21.71	
				Wind: -0.5 m/s	

==== Heat 7 ====
Rank	Lane	Athlete	Nation	Time	Notes
1	5	Kenneth Bednarek	United States	20.01	Q
2	7	Alexander Ogando	Dominican Republic	20.14	Q
3	6	Alaba Akintola	Nigeria	20.54	Q
4	3	Alonso Edward	Panama	20.63	
5	4	Lucas Rodrigues da Silva	Brazil	20.86	
6	9	Taha Hussein Yaseen	Iraq	21.01	
7	8	Albert Komański	Poland	21.16	
—	2	Ryan Zeze	France	DQ	TR 16.8
				Wind: -0.1 m/s	

=== Semi-final ===
The semi-final took place on 24 August, with the 24 athletes involved being split into 3 heats of 8 athletes each. The first 2 athletes in each heat ( Q ) and the next 2 fastest ( q ) will qualify for the final.

==== Heat 1 ====
Rank	Lane	Athlete	Nation	Time	Notes
1	8	Noah Lyles	United States	19.76	Q
2	6	Alexander Ogando	Dominican Republic	20.02	Q
3	3	Tarsis Gracious Orogot	Uganda	20.26	
4	7	Brendon Rodney	Canada	20.27	
5	9	Andrew Hudson	Jamaica	20.38	qR
6	4	Luxolo Adams	South Africa	20.44	
7	2	Shota Iizuka	Japan	20.54	
8	6	Ondřej Macík	Czech Republic	20.71	
				Wind: -0.1 m/s	

==== Heat 2 ====
Rank	Lane	Athlete	Nation	Time	Notes
1	7	Kenneth Bednarek	United States	19.96	Q
2	6	Letsile Tebogo	Botswana	19.97	Q
3	5	Courtney Lindsey	United States	20.22	
4	9	Sinesipho Dambile	South Africa	20.28	PB
5	4	Renan Correa	Brazil	20.43	
6	3	Taymir Burnet	Netherlands	20.65	
7	2	Alaba Akintola	Nigeria		
—	8	Aaron Brown	Canada	DQ	TR 17.3.1
				Wind: 0.0 m/s	

==== Heat 3 ====
Rank	Lane	Athlete	Nation	Time	Notes
1	6	Erriyon Knighton	United States	19.98	Q
2	7	Zharnel Hughes	Great Britain & N.I.	20.02	Q
3	5	Andre De Grasse	Canada	20.10	q
4	4	Joseph Fahnbulleh	Liberia	20.21	q
5	8	Towa Uzawa	Japan	20.33	
6	9	Rasheed Dwyer	Jamaica	20.49	
7	3	Shaun Maswanganyi	South Africa	20.65	
8	2	William Reais	Switzerland	20.67	
				Wind: -0.4 m/s	

=== Final ===
The final started at 21:54 on 25 August.

Rank	Lane	Athlete	Nation	Time	Notes
1st place, gold medalist(s)	6	Noah Lyles	United States	19.52	
2nd place, silver medalist(s)	8	Erriyon Knighton	United States	19.75	
3rd place, bronze medalist(s)	9	Letsile Tebogo	Botswana	19.81	
4	4	Zharnel Hughes	Great Britain & N.I.	20.02	
5	7	Kenneth Bednarek	United States	20.07	
6	3	Andre De Grasse	Canada	20.14	
7	5	Alexander Ogando	Dominican Republic	20.23	
8	1	Andrew Hudson	Jamaica	20.40	
9	2	Joseph Fahnbulleh	Liberia	20.57	
				Wind: -0.2 m/s	
