= Kung Fu Kenny =

Kung Fu Kenny may refer to:

- Kendrick Lamar (born 1987), American rapper
- Kenny Bednarek (born 1998), American sprinter
