= 2026 World Athletics Ultimate Championship – Men's 100 metres =

Men's 100 metres at the 2026 World Athletics Ultimate Championship
- Venue: National Athletics Centre
- Location: Budapest, Hungary
- Dates: 12 September 2026 (semi-finals & final)
- Competitors: 16 from 10 nations
- Winning time: 9.85 s

Champion
- Kenny Bednarek; United States

The men's 100 metres was held over two rounds at the 2026 World Athletics Ultimate Championship at the National Athletics Centre in Budapest, Hungary on 12 September 2026. It was the first time the World Ultimate Championship is held. Athletes qualified by wildcard or by their world ranking.

== Background ==
Global records before the 2026 World Athletics Ultimate Championship
Record	Time	Athlete (nation)	Location	Date
World record	9.58	Usain Bolt (JAM)	Berlin, Germany	16 August 2009
World lead	9.79	Noah Lyles (USA)	New York City, United States	24 July 2026

Area records before the 2026 World Athletics Ultimate Championship
Record	Time	Athlete (nation)	Location	Date
African record	9.77	Ferdinand Omanyala (KEN)	Nairobi, Kenya	18 September 2021
Asian record	9.83	Su Bingtian (CHN)	Tokyo, Japan	1 August 2021
European record	9.80	Marcell Jacobs (ITA)	Tokyo, Japan	1 August 2021
North, Central American, and Caribbean record	9.58	Usain Bolt (JAM)	Berlin, Germany	16 August 2009
Oceanian record	9.85	Lachlan Kennedy (AUS)	Glasgow, United Kingdom	28 July 2026
South American record	9.85	Ronal Longa (COL)	Medellín, Colombia	28 June 2026

== Qualification ==
For the 100 metres, sixteen athletes qualified, up to three by wildcard for winners of the event at the 2024 Summer Olympic, the 2025 World Athletics Championships, or the 2026 Diamond League final and the others by their position at the World Athletics Rankings for the event on 3 September 2026.

== Results ==
=== Semi-finals ===
The semi-finals were held on 12 September at 19:21 (UTC+2). First 4 of each heat (Q) qualified to the final.

==== Heat 1 ====
Place	Lane	Athlete	Nation	Time	Notes
1	5	Oblique Seville	Jamaica	9.90	Q
2	2	Letsile Tebogo	Botswana	9.95	Q, =SB
3	4	Christian Coleman	United States	9.96	Q
4	7	Gift Leotlela	South Africa	10.03	Q
5	8	Lachlan Kennedy	Australia	10.05	
6	3	Romell Glave	Great Britain	10.08	
7	9	Jeremiah Azu	Great Britain	10.13	
8	6	Trayvon Bromell	United States	11.34	
				Wind: (−0.2 m/s)	

==== Heat 2 ====
Place	Lane	Athlete	Nation	Time	Notes
1	6	Kenny Bednarek	United States	9.94	Q
2	9	Ronnie Baker	United States	10.00 [.993]	Q
3	4	Kayinsola Ajayi	Nigeria	10.00 [.000]	Q
4	5	Akani Simbine	South Africa	10.05	Q
5	7	Emmanuel Eseme	Cameroon	10.11	
6	8	Ronal Longa	Colombia	10.12	
7	3	Marcell Jacobs	Italy	10.20	
8	2	Ackeem Blake	Jamaica	10.21	
				Wind: (−0.7 m/s)	

=== Final ===
The final was held on 12 September at 20:49 (UTC+2).

Place	Lane	Athlete	Nation	Time	Notes
1st place, gold medalist(s)	5	Kenny Bednarek	United States	9.85	SB
2	4	Oblique Seville	Jamaica	9.90	
3	7	Ronnie Baker	United States	9.93 [.923]	
4	8	Kayinsola Ajayi	Nigeria	9.93 [.927]	
5	3	Christian Coleman	United States	9.94	
6	9	Gift Leotlela	South Africa	9.98	
7	6	Letsile Tebogo	Botswana	10.07	
8	2	Akani Simbine	South Africa	10.09	
				Wind: (−0.6 m/s)	
