= 2021 World Athletics U20 Championships – Men's 200 metres =

Men's 200 metres at the 2021 World Athletics U20 Championships
- Venue: Kasarani Stadium
- Dates: 20 August (heats and semifinals); 21 August (final)
- Competitors: 36 from 27 nations
- Winning time: 20.21

Medalists
gold medal	Udodi Onwuzurike	Nigeria
silver medal	Letsile Tebogo	Botswana
bronze medal	Sinesipho Dambile	South Africa

The men's 200 metres at the 2021 World Athletics U20 Championships was held at the Kasarani Stadium on 20 and 21 August.

== Records ==
Standing records prior to the 2021 World Athletics U20 Championships
World U20 Record	Erriyon Knighton (USA)	19.88	Eugene, United States	26 June 2021
Championship Record	Michael Norman Jr. (USA)	20.17	Bydgoszcz, Poland	22 July 2016
World U20 Leading	Erriyon Knighton (USA)	19.84	Eugene, United States	27 June 2021

== Results ==
=== Heats ===
Qualification: First 4 of each heat (Q) and the 4 fastest times (q) qualified for the semifinals.

Wind:
Heat 1: -1.0 m/s, Heat 2: 0.0 m/s, Heat 3: -0.4 m/s, Heat 4: +0.4 m/s, Heat 5: +0.2 m/s

Rank	Heat	Name	Nationality	Time	Note
1	1	Udodi Onwuzurike	Nigeria	20.47	Q, PB
2	4	Tazana Kamanga-Dyrbak	Denmark	20.53	Q
3	5	Letsile Tebogo	Botswana	20.63	Q
4	1	Sinesipho Dambile	South Africa	20.68	Q
5	2	Wendell Miller	Bahamas	20.72	Q
6	1	Ali Khalid Mas	Saudi Arabia	20.83	Q, SB
7	2	Benjamin Richardson	South Africa	20.87	Q
8	3	Bryan Levell	Jamaica	20.90	Q
9	4	Eduard Kubelík	Czech Republic	20.92	Q
10	5	Nazzio John	Grenada	20.94	Q
11	1	Shainer Reginfo	Cuba	20.95	Q, SB
12	4	Carlos Brown	Bahamas	20.99	Q, PB
13	5	Blessing Akawasi Afrifah	Israel	21.00	Q
14	4	Jakub Pietrusa	Poland	21.01	Q, PB
15	1	Benyamin Yousefi	Iran	21.08	q, PB
16	2	Filippo Cappelletti	Italy	21.13	Q, PB
17	4	Adekalu Nicholas Fakorede	Nigeria	21.14	q
18	1	Michael Roth	Canada	21.14	q, PB
19	5	Bautista Diamante	Argentina	21.15	Q, PB
20	3	Tarsis Orogot	Uganda	21.28	Q
21	4	Katriel Angulo	Ecuador	21.31	q
22	2	Almond Small	Canada	21.32	Q
23	2	Shanmuga Srinivas Nalubothu	India	21.33	
24	2	Shakeem McKay	Trinidad and Tobago	21.42	
25	3	Jonathan Wambua	Kenya	21.43	Q, PB
25	5	Igor Bogaczyński	Poland	21.43	
27	5	Ioannis Kariofyllis	Greece	21.44	
28	3	Tomás Mondino	Argentina	21.50	Q
29	5	José Figueroa	Puerto Rico	21.50	
30	2	Izaias Alves	Brazil	21.52	SB
31	2	Gregory Prince	Jamaica	21.53	
32	1	Ioannis Granitsiotis	Greece	21.83	
33	3	Amr Hany Soliman	Egypt	22.30	
34	1	Josué Hepburn	Honduras	24.56	PB
	3	Clinton Muunga	Zimbabwe	DNF	
	3	Jayson Mandoze	Botswana	DQ	TR16.8
	4	Ali Anwar Ali Al Balushi	Oman	DNS	
	3	Federico Guglielmi	Italy	DNS	

=== Semifinals ===
Qualification: First 2 of each heat (Q) and the 2 fastest times (q) qualified for the final.

Wind:
Heat 1: +1.3 m/s, Heat 2: +2.3 m/s, Heat 3: +0.4 m/s

Rank	Heat	Name	Nationality	Time	Note
1	2	Udodi Onwuzurike	Nigeria	20.13	Q, w
2	1	Letsile Tebogo	Botswana	20.31	Q, PB
3	1	Tarsis Orogot	Uganda	20.37	Q, NU20R
4	2	Sinesipho Dambile	South Africa	20.45	Q, w
5	2	Blessing Akawasi Afrifah	Israel	20.49	q, w
6	1	Shainer Reginfo	Cuba	20.58	q, PB
7	3	Tazana Kamanga-Dyrbak	Denmark	20.61	Q
8	2	Eduard Kubelík	Czech Republic	20.65	w
9	1	Wendell Miller	Bahamas	20.69	
10	3	Jakub Pietrusa	Poland	20.70	Q, PB
11	3	Bryan Levell	Jamaica	20.71	
12	3	Benjamin Richardson	South Africa	20.71	
13	1	Nazzio John	Grenada	20.79	PB
14	1	Adekalu Nicholas Fakorede	Nigeria	20.87	PB
15	2	Carlos Brown	Bahamas	20.92	w
16	2	Bautista Diamante	Argentina	20.97	w
17	1	Benyamin Yousefi	Iran	21.02	PB
18	3	Filippo Cappelletti	Italy	21.08	PB
19	2	Almond Small	Canada	21.10	w
20	1	Jonathan Wambua	Kenya	21.13	PB
21	2	Katriel Angulo	Ecuador	21.25	w
22	3	Michael Roth	Canada	21.33	
23	3	Tomás Mondino	Argentina	21.58	
	3	Ali Khalid Mas	Saudi Arabia	DNF	

=== Final ===
The final was held on 21 August at 18:14.

Wind: +0.5 m/s

Rank	Lane	Name	Nationality	Time	Note
1st place, gold medalist(s)	3	Udodi Onwuzurike	Nigeria	20.21	NU20R
2nd place, silver medalist(s)	6	Letsile Tebogo	Botswana	20.38	
3rd place, bronze medalist(s)	7	Sinesipho Dambile	South Africa	20.48	SB
4	4	Tarsis Orogot	Uganda	20.57	
5	5	Tazana Kamanga-Dyrbak	Denmark	20.58	
6	1	Shainer Reginfo	Cuba	21.01	
7	2	Blessing Akawasi Afrifah	Israel	21.03	
8	8	Jakub Pietrusa	Poland	25.62	
