= Erriyon Knighton =

American sprinter (born 2004)

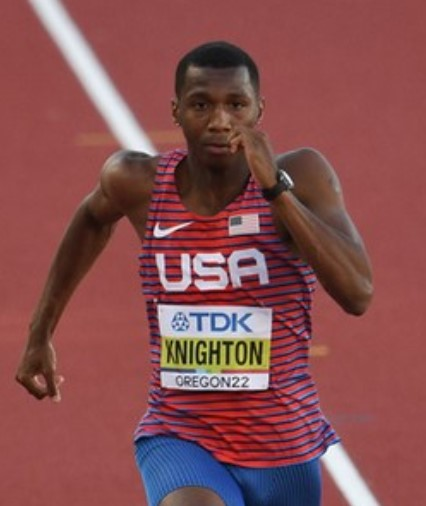
- Knighton at the 2022 World Athletics Championships in Eugene

Personal information
- Born: January 29, 2004 (age 22) Jesup, Georgia, U.S.
- Height: 6 ft 3 in (191 cm)
- Weight: 170 lb (77 kg)

Sport
- Country: United States
- Sport: Track and field
- Events: 100 meters, 200 meters
- Club: My Brother's Keeper Track Club
- Coached by: Jonathan Terry and Mike Holloway

Achievements and titles
- Personal bests: 100 m: 10.04 (Gainesville 2022); 200 m: 19.49 AJR (Baton Rouge 2022); 400 m: 45.37 (Gainesville 2025)
Medal record
Men's athletics
Representing the United States
World Championships
Silver medal – second place	2023 Budapest	200 m
Bronze medal – third place	2022 Eugene	200 m

Erriyon Knighton (born January 29, 2004) is an American sprinter specializing in the 100 meters and 200 meters. At the age of 18, he won the bronze medal in the 200 m at the 2022 World Athletics Championships, becoming the youngest ever individual sprint medalist in Championships history. He was also the silver medalist at the 2023 200m final at the World Championships.

On 12 September 2025, Knighton received a four-year suspension for an anti-doping rule violation in 2024, when appeals by World Athletics and the World Anti-Doping Agency of an earlier ruling were upheld by the Court of Arbitration for Sport.

Knighton holds the world under-18 best in the 200 m of 19.84 seconds, set on June 27, 2021. His best mark of 19.49 s (not ratified as U20 record) makes him the sixth-fastest athlete in history over the distance, only surpassed by Usain Bolt, Yohan Blake, Noah Lyles, Michael Johnson and Letsile Tebogo. It was also the fastest season opener ever.

In 2022, Knighton became the first athlete in history to win a second World Athletics Male Rising Star of the Year award.

== Career ==
=== Junior career ===
Erriyon Knighton started participating in track and field in 2019 as a freshman at Hillsborough High School in Tampa, Florida. During his time there, he ran the second fastest time over 200 meters for an under-18 athlete in world history, clocking 20.33 seconds in the final at the 2020 USA Track & Field Junior Olympics in Satellite Beach, Florida. He also played for Hillsborough's football team as a wide receiver; rated a four-star recruit by 247Sports.com, he received scholarship offers from schools including Alabama, Auburn, Florida State, and Florida.

==== 2021 ====
At age 16 in January, Knighton signed a sponsorship deal with Adidas in his junior year of high school, forgoing his remaining two years of amateur competition at Hillsborough High. On May 2, he broke the 10-second barrier over 100 meters at the PURE Athletics Sprint Elite Meet in Clermont, Florida, with a time of 9.99 seconds, but the wind was over the +2.0 meters per second velocity limit (+2.7) for record consideration.

On May 31, the 17-year-old set the world under-18 best in the boys' 200 meters in a time of 20.11 seconds, breaking Usain Bolt's best by two hundredths of a second. At the US Olympic Trials he would improve that time to 20.04 s in the first round on June 25, and then again to 19.88 s in the semi-finals the following day, breaking Bolt's world U20 record by five hundredths of a second. He then improved his own record to 19.84 seconds in the final on June 27, qualifying for the postponed 2020 Tokyo Summer Olympics.

At the Tokyo Games, Knighton became the youngest male to represent the United States in track and field since Jim Ryun in 1964. On August 3, he finished first in his 200-meter Olympic semi-final heat and qualified for an automatic spot in the final to be run the next day. In the final he finished in fourth with a time of 19.93 seconds.

==== 2022 ====
On April 30, Knighton set an unratified world junior record in the 200 m at the LSU Invitational in Baton Rouge running a time of 19.49 seconds, which remains his personal best up to now. He achieved 19.69 s at the USA Outdoor T&F Championships in June. Knighton later on went on to place third in the event at the 2022 World Athletics Championships, in Eugene, USA, becoming the youngest ever individual sprint medalist in Championship history. He also became the youngest winner of a Diamond League race with his 200 m victory on September 2 in Brussels.

==== 2023 ====
On July 9, 2023, in Eugene during the USA Outdoor T&F Championships, he won his first senior national title by triumphing in the 200 meters with a time of 19.72 seconds.

At the 2023 World Athletics Championships in Budapest in August, Erriyon Knighton once again stood on a world podium by finishing second in the 200 m final with a time of 19.75 seconds. He was once again beaten by Noah Lyles, who won comfortably with a time of 19.52 seconds.

At the end of the season in September, he finished third in the 200 m final of the Diamond League in Eugene with a time of 19.97 seconds.

Erriyon closed his last season as a junior with 18 times under 20 seconds in the 200 meters, with his top 10 times occupying the 10 best U20 performances of all time in the 200 meters.

==== 2024 ====
He started his season with a 200m indoor race in Liévin, France, where he won in a time of 20.21 seconds.

On March 26, Knighton was provisionally suspended by the US Anti-Doping Agency (USADA) after testing positive for a metabolite of the anabolic steroid trenbolone. In June the USADA accepted Knighton's explanation that the source of the trenbolone was contaminated meat and ruled that he bore "no fault or negligence" for the positive test. He therefore received no sanction.

At the US Olympic trials, he placed third in the 200 m with a time of 19.77 seconds, qualifying for the 2024 Summer Olympics in Paris. During the Olympic Games, Knighton recorded times in the 200m of 19.99 in the heats and 20.09 in the semi-final. In the final, Knighton finished in fourth place with a time of 19.99 seconds.

In early August, after the Olympics ended, the Athletics Integrity Unit launched an appeal with the Court of Arbitration for Sport (CAS) against United States Anti-Doping Agency's decision regarding Knighton's positive drug test.

==== 2025 ====
He participated in 2025 USA Outdoor Track and Field Championships, placing fifth in the 200m, with a time of 19.97 seconds.

On September 12, 2025, CAS overturned the USADA decision that Knighton bore "no fault or negligence" for the positive test in 2024 and instead issued him with a four-year ban set to expire in July 2029. CAS accepted appeals from World Athletics and WADA that the evidence for contaminated meat "fell short of the required proof of source" and was "statistically impossible". His results from 26 March 2024 to 12 April 2024 disqualified retroactively.

== Achievements ==
Information from World Athletics profile unless otherwise noted.

=== Personal bests ===
Distance	Time (s)	Wind	Location	Date	Notes
60 meters (i)	6.61		Gainesville, FL, U.S.	February 1, 2025	
100 meters	10.04	-0.1 m/s	Gainesville, FL, U.S.	April 16, 2022	
100 meters	9.98 w	+2.1 m/s	Gainesville, FL, U.S.	April 1, 2023	Wind-assisted
150 meters	14.85	+1.4 m/s	Atlanta, GA, U.S.	May 6, 2023	
200 meters	19.49	+1.4 m/s	Baton Rouge, LA, U.S.	April 30, 2022	AU20R
200 meters (i)	20.21	-	Arena Stade Couvert, Liévin (FRA)	February 10, 2024	
400 meters	45.37	-	Gainesville, FL, U.S.	April 5, 2025	
Youth and junior achievements
200 meters	19.84	+0.3 m/s	Eugene, OR, U.S.	June 27, 2021	World under-18 best

=== International competitions ===
Representing the United States
Year	Competition	Venue	Position	Event	Time	Notes
2021	Olympic Games	Tokyo, Japan	4th	200 m	19.93	
2022	World Championships	Eugene, OR, United States	3rd	200 m	19.80	
2023	World Championships	Budapest, Hungary	2nd	200 m	19.75	
2024	Olympic Games	Paris, France	4th	200 m	19.99	

=== Circuit wins ===
- Diamond League
  - 2022 (200 m): Brussels Memorial Van Damme
  - 2023 (200 m): Golden Gala (Florence), Bislett Games
- World Athletics Continental Tour
  - 2022 (200 m): Gyulai István Memorial
  - 2023 (200 m): Irena Szewinska Memorial
  - 2024 (200 m): Zagreb Hanžeković Memorial

=== National championships ===
Year	Competition	Venue	Position	Event	Time	Wind (m/s)	Notes
2021	U.S. Olympic Trials	Eugene, Oregon	3rd	200 m	19.84	+0.3	WU18B
2022	USATF Championships	Eugene, Oregon	2nd	200 m	19.69	−0.3	WU20R
2023	USATF Championships	Eugene, Oregon	1st	200 m	19.72	−0.1	SB
2024	U.S. Olympic Trials	Eugene, Oregon	3rd	200 m	19.77	+0.5	SB
2025	USATF Championships	Eugene, Oregon	5th	200 m	19.97	+0.2	SB

== Awards ==
- World Athletics Awards

Rising Star (Men): 2021, 2022

Records
Preceded by (Jamaica) Usain Bolt	Boys' World Under-18 Best Holder, 200 meters 31 May 2021 – present	Incumbent
Preceded by (Jamaica) Usain Bolt	Men's World Under-20 Record Holder, 200 meters 26 June 2021 – 12 April 2026	Succeeded by (Australia) Gout Gout
