= 150 metres =

Sprint race

Athletics 150 metres

World records
- Men: Usain Bolt (JAM) 14.35 (2009)
- Women: Favour Ofili (NGR) 15.85 (2025)

150 metres is a sprint event in track and field. It is a very rarely contested non-championship event, and it is not recognised by World Athletics. Given the proportion of standard running tracks, the event typically incorporates a bend when held in a track and field stadium, although some specially-built tracks allow it to take place entirely on a straight.

The event was given a high-profile outing in 1997 as an intermediate contest between two 1996 Olympic champions: Donovan Bailey (100 metres) and Michael Johnson (200 metres). Johnson pulled up mid-race, allowing Bailey to win the $1 million prize. This race coincided with a period of similar 150 m meetings between Bailey and the 1992 Olympic 100 m champion Linford Christie; the pair raced over three years for high cash prizes in Sheffield, England, in 1995, 1996 and 1997, with Christie winning the first two outings and Bailey winning the last.

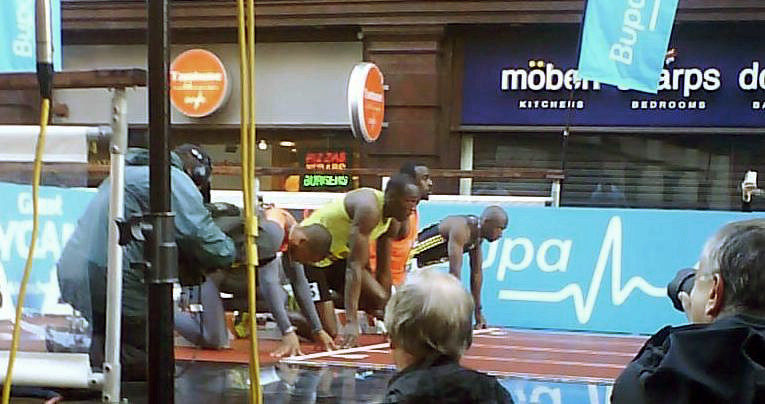
Usain Bolt lining up for his 150 m world best run in Manchester in 2009

The Manchester City Games in England – a competition featuring a long, raised track on one of the city's major streets – has provided many of the event's highlights since 2009, including the men's world best of 14.35 seconds, set by Usain Bolt in 2009. Allyson Felix ran the fastest ever female 150 m race in 2013 (16.36 seconds), although faster times have been recorded at intermediate stages of the 200 m event. The Great North City Games (held variously in Newcastle and Gateshead) feature a similar set-up to the Manchester event and have hosted several of the best men's and women's times. The British events typically attract American, British and Caribbean competitors, and athletes from these places account for nearly all the top 25 best times for men and women. A one-off 150 m race on Copacabana Beach in Rio de Janeiro was held in 2013 and Bolt finished in a time close to his own world best.

The 150 m had some significance as a regular indoor event in the 1960s and 1970s as a result of indoor tracks matching that distance. Wales held a national championship over the distance up to 1972, and Finland briefly had a women's national championship in the mid-1960s. A relay version of the distance (4 × 150 metres) was contested at the 1967 European Athletics Indoor Championships and was won by the Soviet Union's women's team. The distance attracted the attention of 1980 Olympic 200 m champion Pietro Mennea, whose hand-timed run of 14.8 seconds in Cassino, Italy, in 1983 stood as a world-best time for over a quarter of a century. Italy also provided a women's 150 m best that same decade, with Jamaican Merlene Ottey setting a time of 16.46 seconds in Trapani in 1989 – a world-best mark which was unbeaten for over two decades.

== All-time top 25 ==
- + = en route to 200 m performance
- straight = performance on straight track
- NWI = no wind measurement

=== Men ===
| Rank | Time | Type | Wind (m/s) | Athlete | Nationality | Date | Place | Ref. |
|---|---|---|---|---|---|---|---|---|
| 1 | 14.35 | straight | +1.1 | Usain Bolt | Jamaica | 17 May 2009 | Manchester | |
| 2 | 14.41+ | straight | -0.4 | Tyson Gay | United States | 16 May 2010 | Manchester | |
| 2 | 14.41 | straight | +0.3 | Noah Lyles | United States | 18 May 2024 | Atlanta | |
| 4 | 14.65 | straight | +1.4 | Walter Dix | United States | 17 September 2011 | Gateshead | |
| 5 | 14.66 | straight | +0.3 | Zharnel Hughes | United Kingdom | 18 May 2024 | Atlanta | |
| 6 | 14.70 | straight | (−1.1 m/s) | Ferdinand Omanyala | Kenya | 17 May 2025 | Atlanta | |
| 7 | 14.71 | straight | +1.3 | Yohan Blake | Jamaica | 17 May 2014 | Manchester | |
| 8 | 14.75 | straight | +0.1 | Jereem Richards | Trinidad and Tobago | 23 May 2021 | Boston | |
| 9 | 14.78 | bend | 0.0 | Sinesipho Dambile | South Africa | 16 June 2026 | Ostrava, Czech Republic | |
| 10 | 14.8 h | bend | NWI | Pietro Mennea | Italy | 3 September 1979 | Cassino | |
| 11 | 14.81 | straight | +0.2 | Nethaneel Mitchell-Blake | Great Britain | 20 May 2018 | Boston | |
| 12 | 14.83+ | bend | +0.4 | Michael Johnson | United States | 1 August 1996 | Atlanta | |
| 13 | 14.85 | straight | +0.3 | Erriyon Knighton | United States | 6 May 2023 | Atlanta | |
| 14 | 14.86 | straight | +0.3 | Alexander Ogando | Dominican Republic | 18 May 2024 | Atlanta | |
| 15 | 14.87 | straight | +1.4 | Marlon Devonish | Great Britain | 17 September 2011 | Gateshead | |
| 15 | 14.87 | straight | -0.1 | Wallace Spearmon | United States | 20 May 2012 | Manchester | |
| 15 | 14.87 | straight | +0.6 | Reece Prescod | Great Britain | 8 September 2018 | Gateshead | |
| 18 | 14.88 | straight | +1.4 | Daniel Bailey | Antigua and Barbuda | 31 March 2013 | Rio de Janeiro | |
| 19 | 14.89 | straight | +1.0 | Chris Royster | United States | 6 May 2023 | Atlanta | |
| 19 | 14.89 | straight | +0.3 | Ferdinand Omanyala | Kenya | 6 May 2023 | Atlanta | |
| 19 | 14.89 | straight | +0.3 | Josephus Lyles | United States | 18 May 2024 | Atlanta | |
| 22 | 14.90 | straight | -1.0 | Christophe Lemaitre | France | 25 May 2013 | Manchester | |
| 22 | 14.90 | straight | -0.2 | Michael Rodgers | United States | 14 September 2013 | Newcastle | |
| 24 | 14.91 | straight | +1.4 | Bruno de Barros | Brazil | 31 March 2013 | Rio de Janeiro | |
| 25 | 14.93+ | bend | +0.3 | John Regis | Great Britain | 20 August 1993 | Stuttgart | |
| 25 | 14.93 | straight | 0.0 | Miguel Francis | Antigua and Barbuda | 18 June 2016 | Somerville | |
| 25 | 14.93 | straight | +0.3 | Antonio Watson | Jamaica | 6 May 2023 | Atlanta | |
| 25 | 14.93 | straight | (−1.1 m/s) | Terrence Jones | Bahamas | 17 May 2025 | Atlanta | |

==== Notes ====
Below is a list of other times equal or superior to 14.93:

- Usain Bolt also ran 14.42 straight (2013), 14.44+ (2009), 14.85+ (2007).
- Tyson Gay also ran 14.51 (2011), 14.75+ (2007).
- Noah Lyles also ran 14.56 (2023), 14.67 (2026), 14.69 straight (2019), 14.77 (2018).
- Jereem Richards also ran 14.83 straight (2023).
- Marlon Devonish also ran 14.88 straight (2010).

==== Assisted marks ====
Any performance with a following wind of more than 2.0 metres per second is not counted for record purposes. Below is a list of the fastest wind-assisted times (inside 14.92). Only times that are superior to legal bests are shown.

- Linford Christie (GBR) ran 14.74 s (+3.9 m/s) on 23 July 1995 in Sheffield
- Donovan Bailey (CAN) ran 14.92 s (+3.9 m/s) on 23 July 1995 in Sheffield.

=== Women ===
| Rank | Time | Type | Wind (m/s) | Athlete | Nationality | Date | Place | Ref. |
|---|---|---|---|---|---|---|---|---|
| 1 | 15.85 | straight | (+2.0 m/s) | Favour Ofili | Nigeria | 17 May 2025 | Atlanta | |
| 2 | 16.09+ | bend | +0.2 | Shericka Jackson | Jamaica | 8 September 2023 | Brussels | |
| 3 | 16.10+ | bend | +1.3 | Florence Griffith Joyner | United States | 29 September 1988 | Seoul | |
| 4 | 16.14 | straight | (+2.0 m/s) | Tamari Davis | United States | 17 May 2025 | Atlanta | |
| 5 | 16.23+ | bend | +0.6 | Inger Miller | United States | 27 August 1999 | Seville | |
| 5 | 16.23 | straight | -0.7 | Shaunae Miller-Uibo | Bahamas | 20 May 2018 | Boston | |
| 7 | 16.25+ | bend | -0.6 | Julien Alfred | St. Lucia | 19 July 2025 | London | |
| 8 | 16.28+ | bend | +1.7 | Allyson Felix | United States | 31 August 2007 | Osaka | |
| 9 | 16.30 | straight | +0.1 | Tori Bowie | United States | 4 June 2017 | Boston | |
| 9 | 16.30 | straight | 0.0 | Candace Hill | United States | 18 May 2024 | Atlanta | |
| 11 | 16.33+ | bend | 0.0 | Merlene Ottey | Jamaica | 19 August 1993 | Stuttgart | |
| 12 | 16.39+ | bend | -0.4 | Brittany Brown | United States | 28 August 2025 | Zürich | |
| 13 | 16.41 | bend | +1.1 | Brianna Rollins-McNeal | United States | 20 July 2020 | Fort Worth | |
| 14 | 16.42+ | bend | -0.4 | Dina Asher-Smith | Great Britain | 28 August 2025 | Zürich | |
| 15 | 16.43+ | bend | +1.7 | Veronica Campbell-Brown | Jamaica | 31 August 2007 | Osaka | |
| 15 | 16.43 | straight | 0.0 | Celera Barnes | United States | 18 May 2024 | Atlanta | |
| 17 | 16.44 | straight | 0.0 | Daryll Neita | Great Britain | 18 May 2024 | Atlanta | |
| 18 | 16.45+ | bend | -0.6 | Amy Hunt | Great Britain | 19 July 2025 | London | |
| 19 | 16.50 | straight | +1.5 | Carmelita Jeter | United States | 17 September 2011 | Gateshead | |
| 19 | 16.50 | straight | +0.1 | Gabrielle Thomas | United States | 6 May 2023 | Atlanta | |
| 19 | 16.50 | straight | (+2.0 m/s) | Ashanti Moore | Jamaica | 17 May 2025 | Atlanta | |
| 22 | 16.53 | straight | -1.5 | Lynna Irby | United States | 23 May 2021 | Boston | |
| 23 | 16.54+ | bend | +0.6 | Merlene Frazer | Jamaica | 27 August 1999 | Seville | |
| 23 | 16.54 | straight | +0.1 | Debbie Ferguson-McKenzie | Bahamas | 17 May 2009 | Manchester | |
| 25 | 16.56 | bend | +0.6 | Dafne Schippers | Netherlands | 8 September 2020 | Ostrava | |

==== Notes ====
Below is a list of other times equal or superior to 16.56:

- Favour Ofili also ran 16.30 straight (2024).
- Allyson Felix also ran 16.36 straight (2013).
- Shaunae Miller-Uibo also ran 16.37 straight (2019).
- Tamari Davis also ran 16.44 straight (2023).
- Merlene Ottey also ran 16.46 bend (1989).
