= Noah Lyles =

American sprinter (born 1997)

Noah Lyles OLY
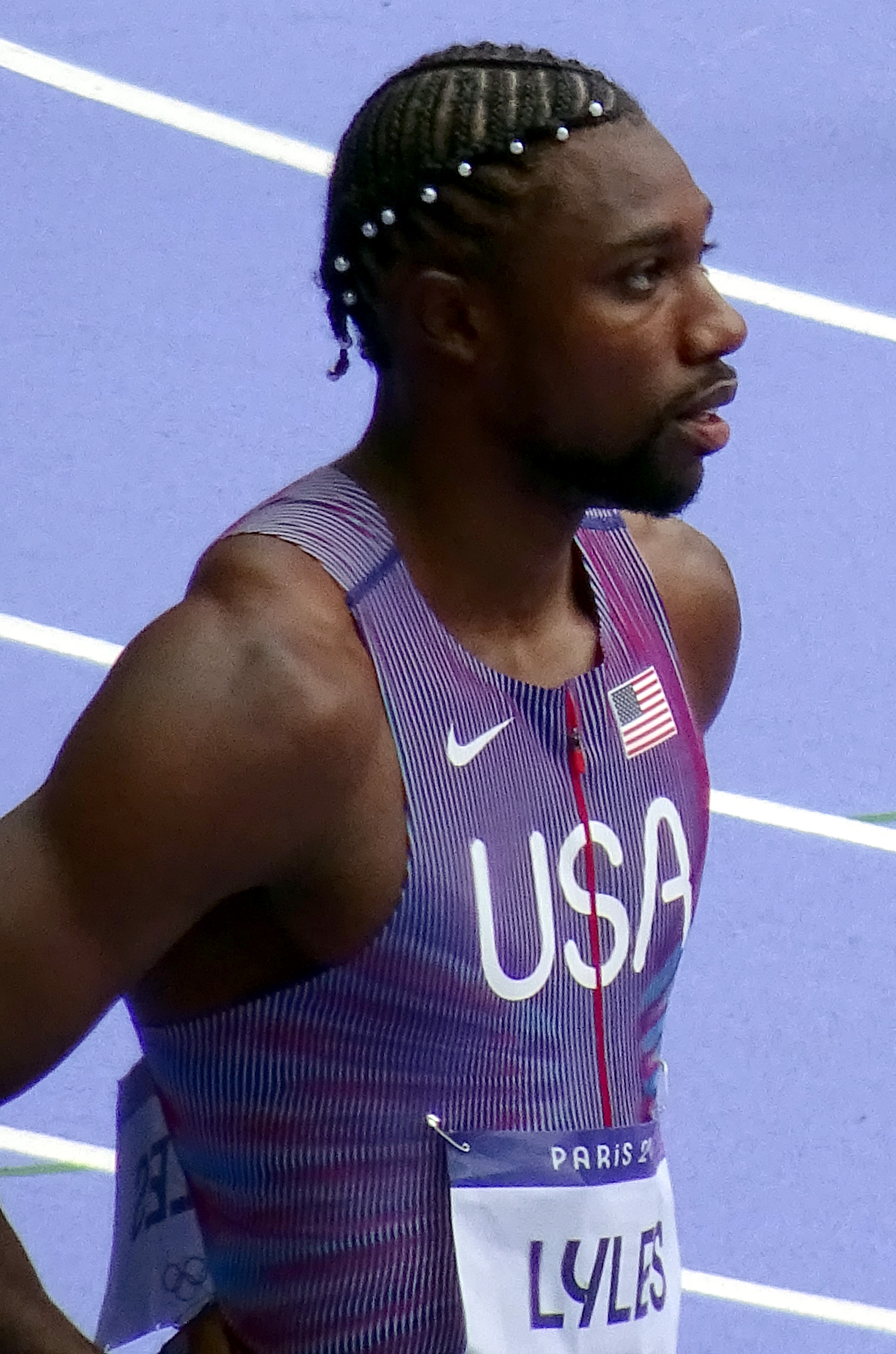
- Lyles at the 2024 Summer Olympics in Paris

Personal information
- Born: July 18, 1997 (age 29) Gainesville, Florida, U.S.
- Home town: Alexandria, Virginia, U.S.
- Height: 5 ft 11 in (180 cm)
- Weight: 170 lb (77 kg)

Sport
- Country: United States
- Sport: Track and Field
- Events: Sprints; Relays
- Club: PURE Athletics
- Team: Adidas
- Turned pro: 2016
- Coached by: Lance Brauman

Achievements and titles
- Highest world ranking: 1st (100m/200m, 2023)
- Personal bests: Outdoors; 100 m: 9.79 (Saint-Denis 2024); 150 m: 14.41 NB (Note: This is not an official American record as World Athletics, the international athletics governing body, does not recognize the distance.) (Atlanta 2024); 200 m: 19.31 NR (Eugene 2022); 400 m: 45.87 (Gainesville 2025); Indoors; 60 m: 6.43 A (Albuquerque 2024)
Medal record
Men's athletics
Representing the United States
Olympic Games
Gold medal – first place	2024 Paris	100 m
Bronze medal – third place	2020 Tokyo	200 m
Bronze medal – third place	2024 Paris	200 m
World Championships
Gold medal – first place	2019 Doha	200 m
Gold medal – first place	2019 Doha	4 × 100 m relay
Gold medal – first place	2022 Eugene	200 m
Gold medal – first place	2023 Budapest	100 m
Gold medal – first place	2023 Budapest	200 m
Gold medal – first place	2023 Budapest	4 × 100 m relay
Gold medal – first place	2025 Tokyo	200 m
Gold medal – first place	2025 Tokyo	4 × 100 m relay
Silver medal – second place	2022 Eugene	4 × 100 m relay
Bronze medal – third place	2025 Tokyo	100 m
World Indoor Championships
Silver medal – second place	2024 Glasgow	60 m
Silver medal – second place	2024 Glasgow	4 × 400 m relay
Diamond League
First place	2017	200 m
First place	2018	200 m
First place	2019	100 m
First place	2019	200 m
First place	2022	200 m
First place	2025	200 m
World Relays
Gold medal – first place	2024 Nassau	4 × 100 m relay
Silver medal – second place	2017 Nassau	4 × 200 m relay
Silver medal – second place	2019 Yokohama	4 × 100 m relay
World U20 Championships
Gold medal – first place	2016 Bydgoszcz	100 m
Gold medal – first place	2016 Bydgoszcz	4 × 100 m relay
Pan American U20 Championships
Gold medal – first place	2015 Edmonton	200 m
Silver medal – second place	2015 Edmonton	100 m
Youth Olympic Games
Gold medal – first place	2014 Nanjing	200 m
World Youth Championships
Silver medal – second place	2013 Donetsk	Medley relay
Continental Cup
Gold medal – first place	2018 Ostrava	100 m
Gold medal – first place	2018 Ostrava	4 × 100 m relay

YouTube information
- Channel: Noah Lyles, Olympian
- Subscribers: 406 thousand
- Views: 44 million
- Last updated: July 18, 2026

Noah Lyles (born July 18, 1997) is an American track and field sprinter who competes in various sprint race events. His personal best of 14.67 seconds in the 150 m reportedly set the world best, (Note: Lyles' 14.67 sec. performance at the 2026 Golden Spike Ostrava was reported by Al Jazeera, Radio France Internationale, Reuters, and The Athletic as setting the world best performance for the 150 m, but does not take into account the 14.44 sec. split time by Usain Bolt during the 2009 World Championships in Athletics – Men's 200 metres. This is likely due to Bolt's time being part of a longer distance race, and not a stand alone event like Lyles'.) and his time of 19.31 seconds in the 200 m is the American record, and makes him the third fastest of all-time. He is an Olympic champion and eight-time World champion.

In the 100 m, Lyles won the gold medal at the 2024 Olympic Games, is three-time world champion (4 × 100 m relay in 2019, 100 m and 4 × 100 m relay events in 2023), and was a 100 m and 4 × 100 m relay gold medalist at the 2016 World U20 Championships.

In the 200 m, Lyles is a four-time world champion (2019, 2022, 2023, 2025) and is the bronze medalist at the 2020 and 2024 Olympic Games. He also won a gold medal in the 2014 Youth Olympic Games.

Lyles completed a sprint triple by winning gold medals in the 100-meter, 200-meter and 4 × 100-meter events at the 2023 World Championships.

== Early life ==
Lyles was born on July 18, 1997, to Keisha Caine Bishop and Kevin Lyles, in Gainesville, Florida. His parents met as students at Seton Hall University, where they both competed in track and field. He has two siblings, Josephus and Abby. After their parents’ divorce, Lyles and his siblings relocated with their mother to Alexandria, Virginia.

Lyles was homeschooled during his early years while growing up with asthma, but was later able to attend public school.

Originally a gymnast, Lyles took up track and field at age 12. While watching the 2012 Summer Olympics on TV, he and his brother declared their intention to run together at the 2016 Summer Games. Lyles attended T. C. Williams High School (now Alexandria City High School).

== Early career ==
Lyles represented the United States at the 2014 Youth Olympic Games where he won a gold medal in the 200 m.

In January 2015, Lyles cleared 2.03 m (6 ft 7 3/4 in) in the high jump as a high school junior. In November 2015, he was named 2015 high school boys athlete of the year by Track & Field News.

In March 2016, Lyles won the 200 m at the New Balance Nationals Indoor. In April 2016, he won both the 100 m and 200 m at the 2016 Arcadia Invitational, setting new meeting records of 10.17 s and 20.48 s respectively. In June 2016, Lyles won the 100 m in 10.08 s at the USA Junior Championships.

In July 2016, Lyles went to the U.S. Olympic Trials to compete for spots on the Olympic team in the 100 m and the 200 m. He failed to advance from his first 100 m heat, but in the 200 m he won his semi-final and then placed fourth in the final with a time of 20.09 s, breaking a 31-year-old national high school record. Though he didn't qualify for the 2016 Summer Olympics, he qualified for the 2016 World U20 Championships where he was a double gold medalist, taking the 100 m and 4 × 100 m relay titles.

== Professional career ==
Lyles had committed to compete for the Florida Gators at the University of Florida, but in July 2016, Noah and his younger brother Josephus instead turned professional and signed with Adidas. In November 2016, Lyles was again named high school boys athlete of the year for 2016 by Track & Field News.

Lyles started 2017 with his first senior national title in the 300 m at the 2017 USA Indoor Championships in the thin air of Albuquerque, New Mexico, improving the indoor world record by one hundredth of a second to 31.87 s. He earned a silver medal in the 4 × 200-meter relay with team USA at the 2017 World Relays. Lyles won two meets in the 2017 IAAF Diamond League circuit, winning the final ahead of American champion Ameer Webb and world champion Ramil Guliyev. However, injuries prevented him from competing much of the season and he missed the 2017 World Championships as a result.

=== 2018 ===
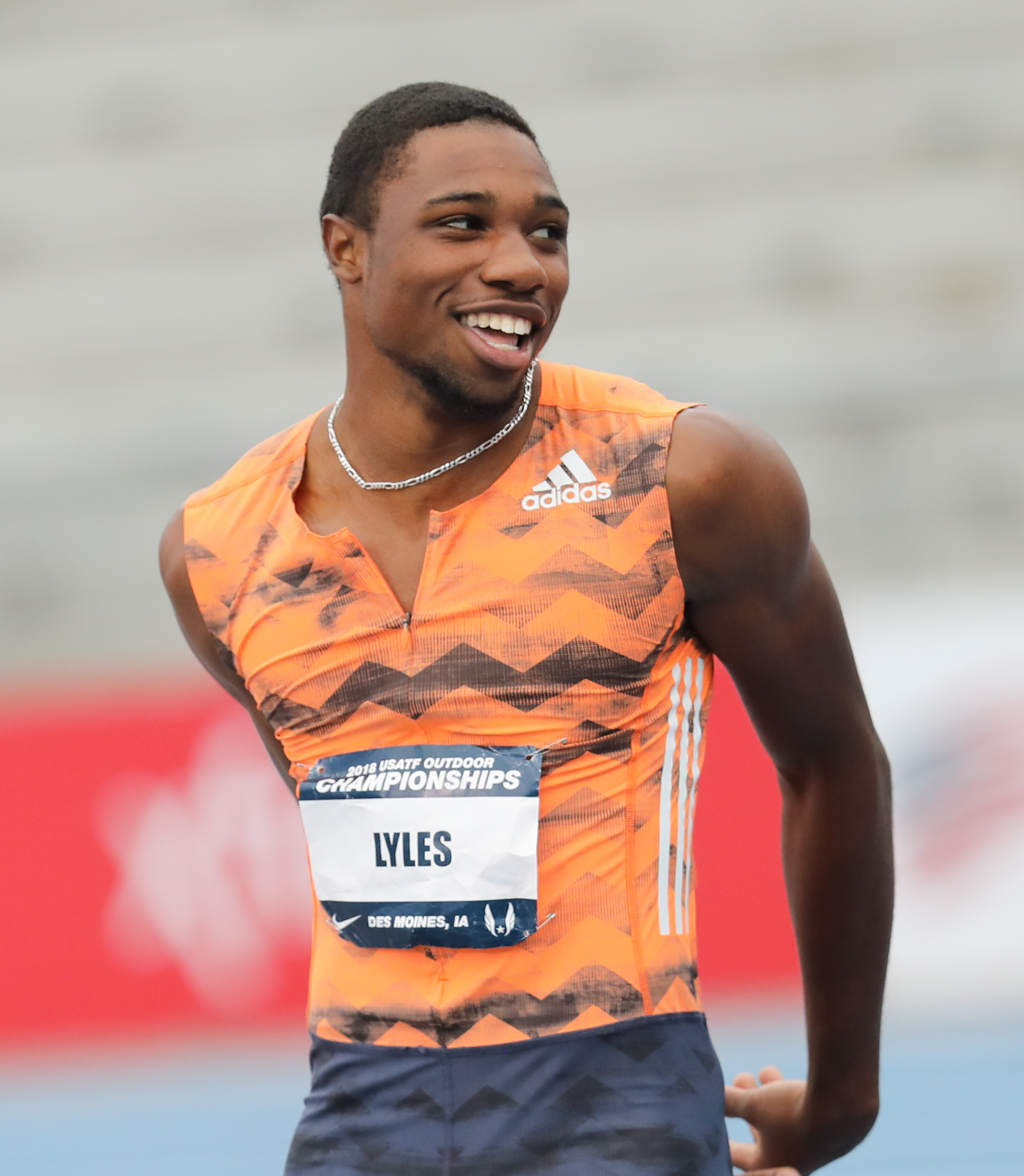
Lyles at the 2018 USATF Championships.

Lyles returned to Albuquerque to compete at the 2018 USA Indoor Championships, but in the 60-meter dash instead of the 300 m. He made it through his first heat while equaling his personal best time of 6.57 s, but failed to advance through his semi-final. Having failed to make the national team for the 2018 World Indoor Championships, he turned his focus to preparing for the outdoor season. He opened with a win in the 200 m at the IAAF Diamond League Doha meet, setting a new personal best with a time of 19.83 s. A few weeks later he ran the less common 150 m at the adidas Boston Games, winning in a personal best time of 14.77 s. He returned to the 200 m at the IAAF Diamond League in Eugene, winning and improving his personal best time to 19.69 s. This time matched the world leading time set by Clarence Munyai earlier that year.

At the 2018 USA Championships he focused on the 100 m instead, matching the world lead of 9.89 s in the semi-final. Mike Rodgers had set the world lead a day before in a separate heat, but he did not start in the semi-finals. This left Lyles' primary rival to be Ronnie Baker, who had run the 100 m in 9.78 s at the Prefontaine Classic earlier that year, but with a wind velocity just over the allowable limit for record purposes (+2.4 m/s). In the final Baker got out a few meters ahead of Lyles out of the blocks, but Lyles started to come back halfway through the race and just passed Baker in the last meter to win in 9.88 s, a new world lead and personal best time for Lyles. He became the youngest U.S. champion in the 100 m since Sam Graddy won in 1984.

Lyles world lead in the 100 m would later be beaten by Baker (9.87 s) and then Christian Coleman (9.79 s), but at the Herculis IAAF Diamond League meet in Monaco Lyles set a new 200 m world lead and personal best time in 19.65 s. The time placed him in the top-10 fastest men in the 200 m of all time. Before that Lyles equaled his personal best and world lead at the Athletissima IAAF Diamond League meet to win a greatly anticipated showdown against Michael Norman, who had set the indoor world record in the 400-meter dash earlier that year. Lyles went into the IAAF Diamond League final, the Weltklasse Zürich, as the favorite. He was again matched up against world champion Ramil Guliyev who recently also become European champion, setting a personal best of 19.76 s in the process. The two were placed in adjacent lanes and ran evenly through the bend, but Lyles started to pull away on the straight and finished in 19.67 s. It was his fourth time under 19.70 s in the same season. Only one other individual has been under 19.70 s four times in a career, world record holder Usain Bolt who also did it four times during his record-breaking 2009 season.

=== 2019 ===
In 2019, Lyles opened the season by running 100 meters races, running a 9.86 (+0.9) world leader in Shanghai on May 18. In his first 200-meter race, at the Pietro Mennea Golden Gala meet, he equalled Mennea's long standing 1979 world record time running a 19.72 (+0.7). A month later at Athletissima in Lausanne, he dropped his personal best to 19.50 (−0.1) to move into the number four position on the all-time list. A week later he ran a 9.92 (+0.3) 100 in Monaco. With the extended schedule in 2019, he ran the US National Championships at the end of July, taking the 200-meter title in 19.78 (−0.7) into a headwind in Des Moines. Then in Paris he ran 19.65 (+0.2).

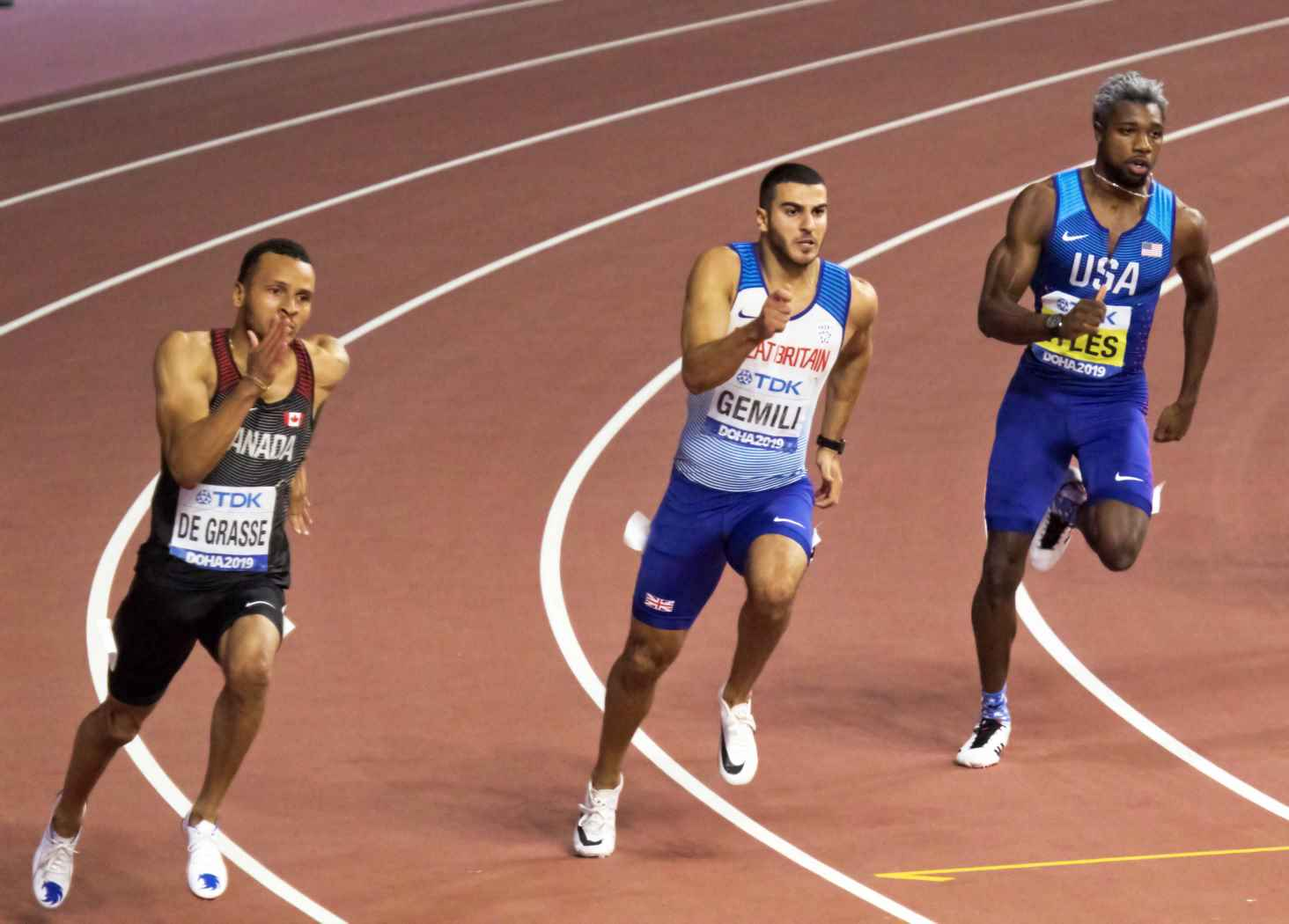
Noah Lyles (R) en route to the 200 m victory at Doha 2019.

Lyles won gold medals in the 200 m and the 4 × 100 m relay at the 2019 World Athletics Championships held in Doha, Qatar.

=== 2022 to present ===
On July 21, 2022, during the World Athletics Championships on home soil in Eugene, Oregon, Lyles claimed his second global title in the 200 m and surpassed Michael Johnson's long standing national record of 19.32 by running 19.31, which moved him to third on the world all-time list. Lyles went on to be part of the silver-winning team in the 4 × 100 m relay, where they were narrowly beaten by Canada. He capped his fine season in the Zürich Diamond League final with victory in 200 m, securing his fourth Diamond Trophy over the distance and fifth overall. Lyles was undefeated in his specialist event that year, breaking 20 seconds in all 12 of his races, including heats and finals.

At the 2023 World Athletics Championships held in Budapest, Lyles won the 100 m with a personal best of 9.83. Lyles went on to also win gold in the 200-meters with a time of 19.52 s. This was his third title in the 200 m and fifth overall in the World Athletics Championships. With his three 200 m world champion titles, he surpassed Michael Johnson (2) and Calvin Smith (2) and this moved him to second on the world all-time list for World Championship 200 m titles, only behind Usain Bolt with four titles.

On June 9, 2024, Lyles clocked 19.77 seconds for 200 m in New York City into a headwind of 1.6 m/s. As of 2026, this is the fastest time into such a strong headwind.

Lyles set a new 100 m personal best time of 9.81 s in winning at the London Diamond League on July 20, 2024. He won the 100 m at the 2024 Olympics with a new personal best of 9.784, giving a 0.005 second margin over Jamaica's Kishane Thompson (9.789). It was the first US victory in the event since 2004. The race was so close that Leigh Diffey calling the race for American NBC Sports prematurely declared Thompson the winner. After winning the gold medal, Lyles immediately said "America! I told you! I got this!" to American viewers.

Lyles' next event was the 200 m, in which he got the bronze medal with a time of 19.70, behind Letsile Tebogo and Kenny Bednarek. Following the event, he collapsed on the track and was taken off in a wheelchair. It was later confirmed that Lyles had tested positive for COVID-19 two days prior, which "affected [his] performance". He later stated he would not run in the 4 × 100 m or 4 × 400 m relay races.

In November 2024, Lyles won an exhibition 50 meter race against content creator IShowSpeed for $100,000, which was later donated to charity. The race was organized and refereed by MrBeast.

Lyles started the 2025 season with a 400-meter race at the Tom Jones Memorial and ran 45.87 s. He then suffered a tendon injury, leading him to delay the start of his season until July. Coming back from injury, he won the 200 m at the Monaco Diamond League with a time of 19.88 s, beating Olympic champion Tebogo.

At the 2025 World Athletics Championships held in Tokyo, Lyles won the bronze medal in the 100 m with a time of 9.89 s. He rebounded in the 200 m to win his fourth consecutive title with a time of 19.52 s. He then proceeded to anchor the US 4 × 100 m relay team to victory with a time of 37.29 s.

On the 16th June 2026, at the Ostrava Golden Spike, Noah Lyles set a 150m curved track world best of 14.67, beating Jamaican sprinter Kishane Thompson's previous 14.92.

== Personal life ==
Lyles has posted on X that he has asthma, allergies, dyslexia, ADD, anxiety, and depression.

He is also an anime fan, and has been seen carrying Yu-Gi-Oh! cards during competitions.

His wife is Jamaican track and field athlete Junelle Bromfield. In October 2024, Lyles and Bromfield got engaged. They were married on April 4, 2026.

== Achievements ==
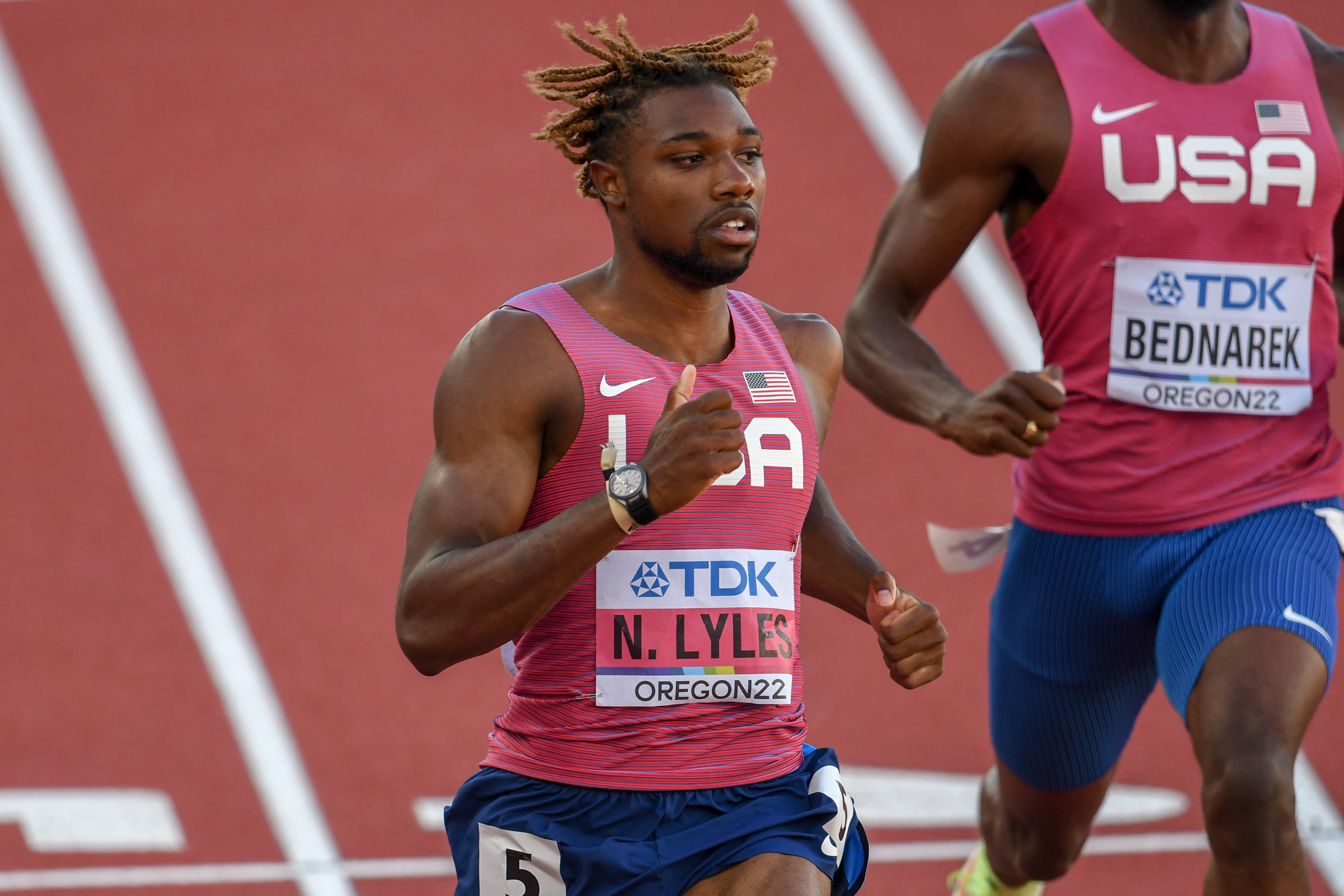
Lyles at the 2022 World Athletics Championships held in Eugene

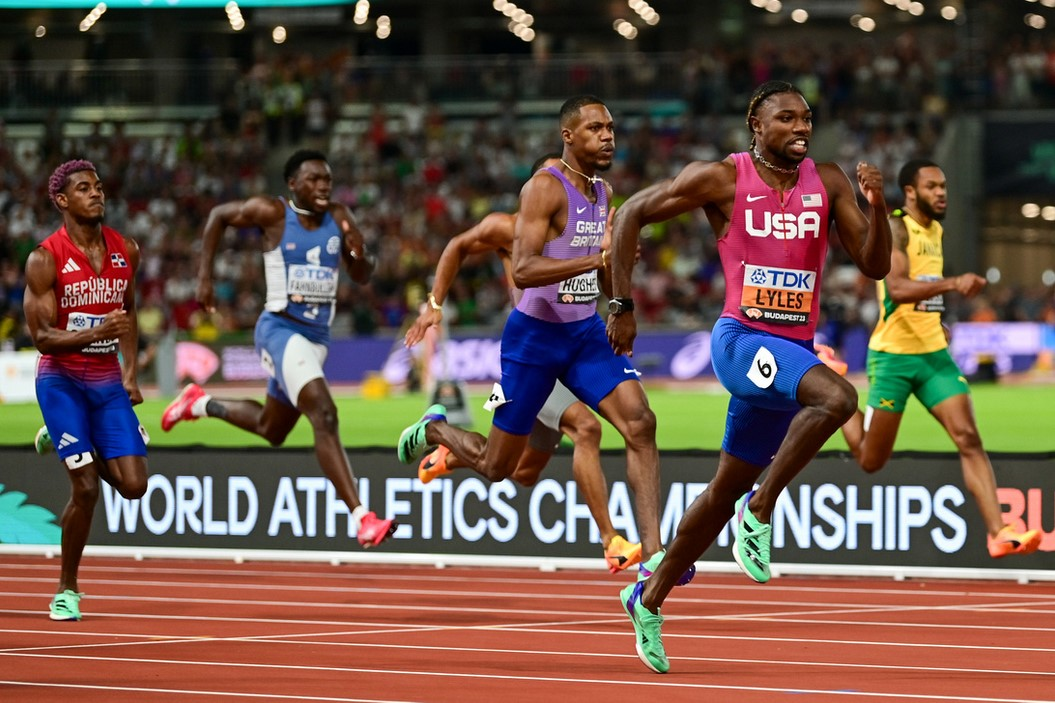
Lyles competing in the 200 m final in Budapest

Information from World Athletics profile unless otherwise noted.

=== Personal bests ===
Event	Mark	Wind (m/s)	Location	Date	Notes
100 m	9.79	+1.0	Saint-Denis, France	August 4, 2024	
100 m	9.79	+0.8	New York City, United States	July 24, 2026	
150 m- straight track	14.41	+0.3	Atlanta, United States	May 18, 2024	NB, 2nd of all-time
150m- curved track	14.67	±0.0	Ostrava, Czechia	June 16, 2026	WB
200 m	19.31	+0.4	Eugene, United States	July 21, 2022	NR, WL, 3rd of all-time
400 m	45.87	—N/a	Gainesville, United States	April 19, 2025	
4 × 100 m relay	37.10	—N/a	Doha, Qatar	October 5, 2019	NR, WL, 2nd of all-time
4 × 200 m relay	1:19.88	—N/a	Nassau, Bahamas	April 23, 2017	
60 m indoor	6.43 A	—N/a	Albuquerque, United States	February 17, 2024	Altitude-assisted
200 m indoor	20.63	—N/a	New York, United States	March 13, 2016	
300 m indoor	31.87 A	—N/a	Albuquerque, United States	March 4, 2017	Altitude-assisted
High jump indoor	2.03 m	—N/a	Blacksburg, United States	January 31, 2015	

Lyles has broken 20 seconds for 200 metres 47 times without wind assistance through 2025—more than any other athlete.

=== International competitions ===
Representing the United States
Year	Competition	Host	Position	Event	Time	Wind (m/s)	Notes
2013	World Youth Championships	Donetsk, Ukraine	9th	200 m	21.58	−2.5	
2013	World Youth Championships	Donetsk, Ukraine	2nd	Medley relay	1:50.14	—N/a	PB
2014	Youth Olympic Games	Nanjing, China	1st	200 m	20.80	+0.3	
2015	Pan American U20 Championships	Edmonton, Canada	2nd	100 m	10.18	+0.4	
2015	Pan American U20 Championships	Edmonton, Canada	1st	200 m	20.27	+1.3	
2016	World U20 Championships	Bydgoszcz, Poland	1st	100 m	10.17	−0.2	SB
2016	World U20 Championships	Bydgoszcz, Poland	1st	4 × 100 m relay	38.93	—N/a	PB
2017	World Relays	Nassau, Bahamas	2nd	4 × 200 m relay	1:19.88	—N/a	PB
2018	Continental Cup	Ostrava, Czech Republic	1st	100 m	10.01	±0.0	
2018	Continental Cup	Ostrava, Czech Republic	1st	4 × 100 m relay	38.05	—N/a	PB
2019	World Relays	Yokohama, Japan	2nd	4 × 100 m relay	38.07	—N/a	
2019	World Championships	Doha, Qatar	1st	200 m	19.83	+0.3	
2019	World Championships	Doha, Qatar	1st	4 × 100 m relay	37.10	—N/a	WL NR, 2nd all time
2021	Olympic Games	Tokyo, Japan	3rd	200 m	19.74	−0.5	=SB
2022	World Championships	Eugene, United States	1st	200 m	19.31	+0.4	WL NR, 3rd all time
2022	World Championships	Eugene, United States	2nd	4 × 100 m relay	37.55	—N/a	
2023	World Championships	Budapest, Hungary	1st	100 m	9.83	±0.0	WL PB
2023	World Championships	Budapest, Hungary	1st	200 m	19.52	−0.2	
2023	World Championships	Budapest, Hungary	1st	4 × 100 m relay	37.38	—N/a	
2024	World Indoor Championships	Glasgow, United Kingdom	2nd	60 m	6.44	—N/a	
2024	World Indoor Championships	Glasgow, United Kingdom	2nd	4 × 400 m relay	3:02.60	—N/a	
2024	World Relays	Nassau, Bahamas	1st	4 × 100 m relay	37.40	—N/a	WL
2024	Olympic Games	Paris, France	1st	100 m	9.79 (.784)	+1.0	PB
2024	Olympic Games	Paris, France	3rd	200 m	19.70	+0.4	
2025	World Championships	Tokyo, Japan	3rd	100 m	9.89	+0.3	
2025	World Championships	Tokyo, Japan	1st	200 m	19.52	±0.0	
2025	World Championships	Tokyo, Japan	1st	4 × 100 m relay	37.29	—N/a	

=== Circuit wins and titles ===
- Diamond League 100 m champion: 2019
- Diamond League 200 m champion: 2017, 2018, 2019, 2022, 2025

200 meters wins, other events specified in parentheses

- 2017 (2): Shanghai Diamond League (=WL PB), Brussels Memorial Van Damme
- 2018 (5): Doha Diamond League (MR PB), Eugene Prefontaine Classic (PB), Lausanne Athletissima (WL PB), Monaco Herculis (WL MR PB), Zürich Weltklasse
- 2019 (5): Shanghai (100 m, WL PB), Lausanne (WL MR PB), Paris Meeting (MR), Zürich (100 m), Brussels
- 2020 (1): Monaco (WL)
- 2021 (1): Eugene (WL MR)
- 2022 (4): Doha, Monaco (MR), Lausanne, Zürich (MR)
- 2023 (3): Paris (100 m), London (WL MR), Zürich
- 2024 (1): London (100 m)
- 2025 (2): Monaco, Zürich
- 2026 (1): Rome (100m)

=== National championships ===
Year	Competition	Venue	Position	Event	Time	Wind (m/s)	Notes
2013	U.S. World Youth Trials	Edwardsville, Illinois	3rd	200 m	21.62	−3.9	
2015	USATF U20 Championships	Eugene, Oregon	1st	100 m	10.14	+2.0	PB
2015	USATF U20 Championships	Eugene, Oregon	1st	100 m	10.18	+1.8	PB
2016	USATF U20 Championships	Clovis, California	1st	100 m	10.08 w	+2.2	Wind-assisted
2016	U.S. Olympic Trials	Eugene, Oregon	22nd	100 m	10.16	+1.8	SB
2016	U.S. Olympic Trials	Eugene, Oregon	4th	200 m	20.09	+1.6	PB
2017	USATF Indoor Championships	Albuquerque, New Mexico	1st	300 m	31.87 A	—N/a	Altitude assisted, WB
2017	USATF Championships	Sacramento, California	4th (heats)	200 m	20.54	−2.5	Q (Note: Qualified for the semis, but did not start (DNS).)
2018	USATF Indoor Championships	Albuquerque, New Mexico	9th	60 m	6.59 A	—N/a	Altitude-assisted
2018	USATF Championships	Des Moines, Iowa	1st	100 m	9.88	+1.1	PB
2019	USATF Championships	Des Moines, Iowa	1st	200 m	19.78	−0.7	
2021	U.S. Olympic Trials	Eugene, Oregon	7th	100 m	10.05	+0.8	
2021	U.S. Olympic Trials	Eugene, Oregon	1st	200 m	19.74	+0.3	
2022	USATF Championships	Eugene, Oregon	1st	200 m	19.67	−0.3	
2023	USATF Championships	Eugene, Oregon	3rd	100 m	10.00	+0.1	
2024	USATF Championships	Albuquerque, New Mexico	1st	60 m	6.43 A	—N/a	Altitude-assisted, PB
2024	U.S. Olympic Trials	Eugene, Oregon	1st	100 m	9.83	+0.4	
2024	U.S. Olympic Trials	Eugene, Oregon	1st	200 m	19.53	+0.5	MR
2025	USATF Championships	Eugene, Oregon	1st	200 m	19.63	+0.2	
2026	USATF Championships	New York City	1st	100 m	9.79	+0.8	WL, =PB

=== Season's bests ===
w = wind-assisted (wind velocity more than +2.0 m/s)

100 meters
Year	Time	Wind (m/s)	Venue	World rank
2026	9.79	+0.8	New York City, United States	4
2025	9.89	+0.3	Tokyo, Japan	2
2024	9.79	+1.0	Saint-Denis, France	1
2023	9.83	±0.0	Budapest, Hungary	1
2022	9.95	+0.3	Berlin, Germany	=15
2021	9.95	+1.9	Eugene, United States	10
2020	9.93 w	+4.0	Montverde, United States	—N/a
2020	10.04	+1.4	Clermont, United States	9
2019	9.86	+0.9	Shanghai, China	2
2018	9.88	+1.1	Des Moines, United States	3
2018	9.86 w	+4.1	Gainesville, United States	—N/a
2017	9.95 w	+4.3	Clermont, United States	—N/a
2016	10.16	+1.8	Eugene, United States	>100
2016	10.08 w	+2.2	Clovis, United States	—N/a
2015	10.14	+2.0	Eugene, United States	82
2015	10.07 w	+4.3	Edmonton, Canada	—N/a
2014	10.45	+1.0	Greensboro, United States	>100
2013	10.86	−1.5	Newport News, United States	>100
2012	11.27	−1.8	Newport News, United States	>100

- World rank from World Athletics' Season Top Lists.

200 meters
Year	Time	Wind (m/s)	Venue	World rank
2026	19.91	+1.6	Florida, United States	8
2025	19.51	+1.0	Tokyo, Japan	1
2024	19.53	+0.5	Eugene, United States	5
2023	19.47	+1.6	London, England	1
2022	19.31	+0.4	Eugene, United States	1
2021	19.52	+1.5	Eugene, United States	3
2020	19.76	+0.7	Monaco	1
2019	19.50	−0.1	Lausanne, Switzerland	1
2018	19.65	+0.9	Monaco	1
2017	19.90	−0.4	Shanghai, China	4
2016	20.09	+1.6	Eugene, United States	17
2016	20.04 w	+3.3	Eugene, United States	—N/a
2015	20.18	+1.8	Eugene, United States	28
2014	20.71	−0.4	Nanjing, China	>100
2013	21.28	−0.6	Donetsk, Ukraine	>100
2012	21.82	+0.1	Baltimore, United States	>100

- World rank from World Athletics' Season Top Lists.

=== Honors and awards ===
- Night of Legends Award

Jesse Owens Male Athlete of the Year: 2022, 2023

- World Athletics Awards

World Athlete of the Year (Men): 2023

- Laureus World Sports Awards

Sportsman of the Year: 2024 Nominee

== See also ==
- 2018 in 100 metres
- 2019 in 100 metres
- 2020 in 100 metres
- 2021 in 100 metres
- 2022 in 100 metres
- List of Youth Olympic Games gold medalists who won Olympic gold medals

== Notes ==
Achievements
Preceded by (Botswana) Isaac Makwala	Men's 200 meters season's best 2018, 2019	Incumbent
Awards
Preceded by Trentavis Friday	Track & Field News High School Boys Athlete of the Year; 2015, 2016	Succeeded by Armand Duplantis
