= John B. Todd Stadium =

Football stadium in Newport News, Virginia

Coordinates: 37.073764°N 76.496145°W

- Interactive map of John B. Todd Stadium
- Location: Newport News, Virginia
- Owner: Newport News Public Schools
- Capacity: 7,700
- Surface: Bermuda Grass
- Scoreboard: Fair Play FB-8132TKH-2

Construction
- Opened: 1967

John B. Todd Stadium is a football stadium in Newport News, Virginia located on Warwick Boulevard between Minton and Hidenwood Drives. It is named after John B. Todd, who was a standout football player at Newport News High School and The College of William and Mary.

Todd Stadium is owned and operated by Newport News Public Schools since its opening in 1967. All five high schools in Newport News use the stadium for football as well as track meets in order to consolidate resources among their members. Joseph S. Darling Memorial Stadium in nearby Hampton, Virginia serves high schools in Hampton in a similar fashion.

Todd Stadium has a capacity of 7,700 people. It is typically packed for AAA Peninsula District games and has also been used for state championship football games, most recently for the 2006 AAA Division 5 Championship between Phoebus High School and Edison High School. Todd Stadium is also used for the VHSL AAA state track and field championships.
