= Kenny Bednarek =

American sprinter (born 1998)

Kenny Bednarek OLY
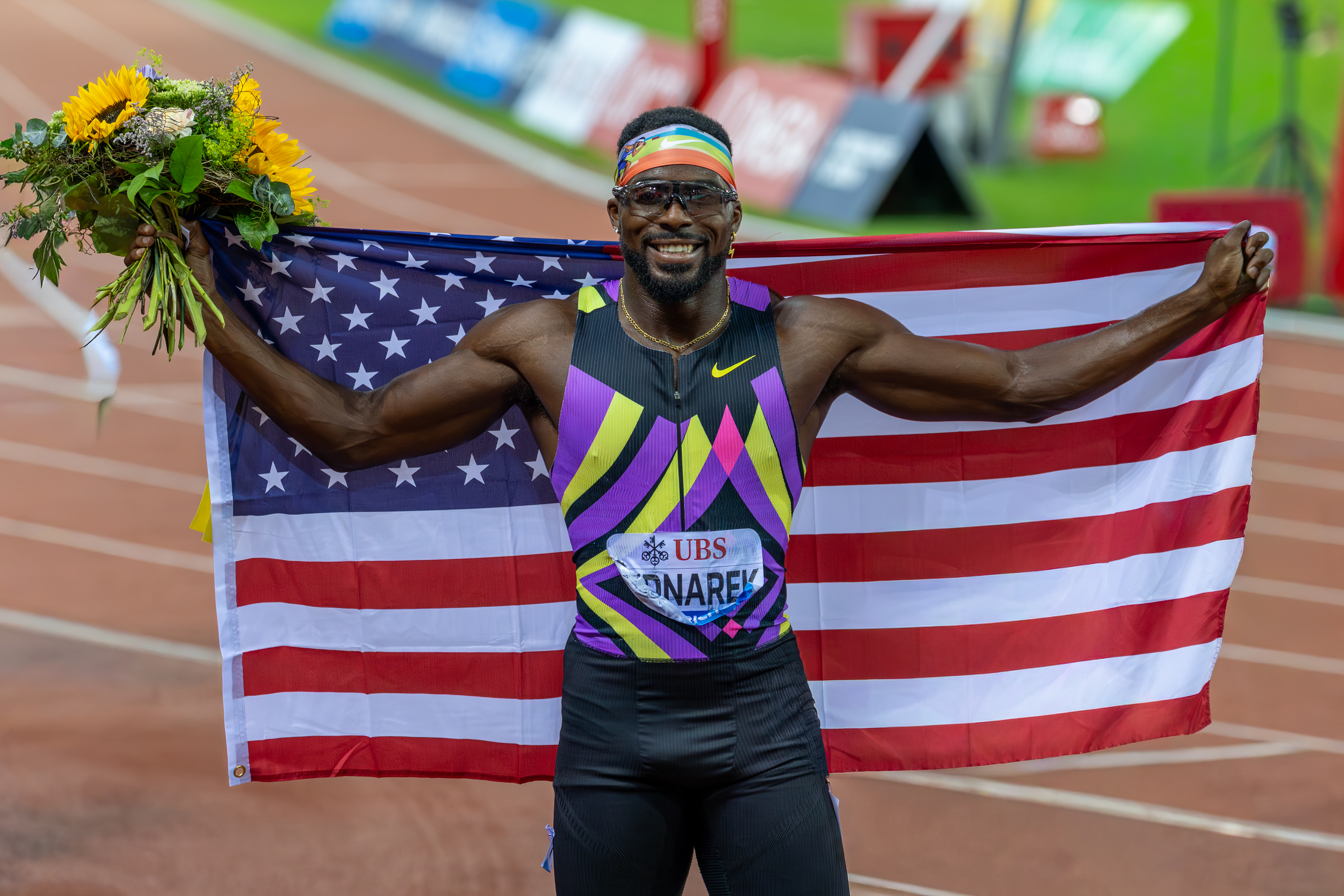
- Kenneth Bednarek sets a meet record in the 200 meter race at the 2026 Weltklasse Zürich athletics competition.

Personal information
- Nickname: Kung Fu Kenny
- Born: October 14, 1998 (age 28) Tulsa, Oklahoma, U.S.
- Height: 6 ft 2 in (188 cm)

Sport
- Country: United States
- Sport: Track and field
- Event: Sprints 200 m/100 m
- College team: Indian Hills Warriors
- Turned pro: 2019
- Coached by: Dennis Mitchell

Achievements and titles
- Olympic finals: 2020 Tokyo 200 m finals silver medalist 19.68
- World finals: 2022 Eugene 200 m finals silver medalist 19.77
- Personal bests: 100 m: 9.79 (2025); 200 m: 19.52 (2026); 400 m: 44.73 (2019)
Medal record
Men's athletics
Representing the United States
Olympic Games
Silver medal – second place	2020 Tokyo	200 m
Silver medal – second place	2024 Paris	200 m
World Championships
Gold medal – first place	2025 Tokyo	4 × 100 m relay
Silver medal – second place	2022 Eugene	200 m
Silver medal – second place	2025 Tokyo	200 m
World Ultimate Championship
First place	2026 Budapest	100 m
First place	2026 Budapest	200 m
World Relays
Gold medal – first place	2024 Nassau	4 × 100 m relay
Silver medal – second place	2025 Guangzhou	4 × 100 m relay
Diamond League
First place	2021	200 m
First place	2024	200 m
First place	2026	200 m

Kenneth Bednarek OLY (born October 14, 1998) is an American track and field sprinter from Rice Lake, Wisconsin. He specializes in the 100-meter and 200-meter distances, having won a silver medal at the 2020 Summer Olympics, 2022 World Championships, and at the 2024 Summer Olympics. At the inaugural 2026 World Athletics Ultimate Championship, Bednarek won both the 100 metres and 200 metres, earning his first two individual global titles; his winning 200-metre time of 19.52 seconds was a personal best and moved him to seventh on the world all-time list.

== Early life ==
Born in Tulsa, Oklahoma, Bednarek and his fraternal twin brother, Ian, were adopted by Mary Bednarek and moved to Rice Lake, Wisconsin. Both brothers took to running youth track starting in the second grade. Running for Rice Lake High School, Kenny won seven individual state titles and led his team to a 4 × 400 relay championship. His 20.43 was the number one high school 200-meter time in the nation in 2018.

He also played football at Rice Lake, scoring 17 touchdowns as a wide receiver, kick returner and on jet sweeps during his junior and senior years, recorded on videos posted on the recruiting website hudl.com. He also starred as a gunner on special teams. During his senior year, his Rice Lake Warriors teams won state championships in both track and football. Bednarek holds Wisconsin all-class records for 200 and 400 meters and the Division 2 record for 100 meters.

== Collegiate career ==
Bednarek did not qualify academically for a major four-year university, so he enrolled at Indian Hills Community College in Ottumwa, Iowa. He said, "I had a goal to go to university after JUCO, but obviously God (had) a different plan." At Indian Hills, Bednarek ran the fastest indoor 200 m in the US, the #2 time in the world for the indoor season, which tied him as the #25 individual on the all time indoor list at the time.

On May 17, 2019, running as a freshman for Indian Hills Community College in Ottumwa, Iowa at the age of 20, he ran the fourth fastest 200 meters ever at the time, under any conditions, running 19.49 at altitude with an exceptionally strong 6.1 mps aiding wind in the semi-finals of the NJCAA National Championships in Hobbs, New Mexico. The following day, Bednarek proved his speed by running 19.82 into a -0.8 headwind and running a 44.73 400 meters on the same day, becoming the NJCAA national champion in both events. 19.82 displaced Olympic gold medalist Tommie Smith's former world record for the #30 fastest legal race of all time. Six men have run faster into a negative wind, but -0.9 is the strongest hindering wind against any athlete to break 19.95.

Only one other person, Botswanan Isaac Makwala, has ever run sub-20 and sub-45 in the same day. Makwala was 28 when he did that in Madrid on July 6, 2014, making Bednarek the youngest athlete and only American athlete to pull off the feat.

For his achievement, Bednarek was named the "USATF Athlete of the Week" on May 22, 2019.

== Professional career ==
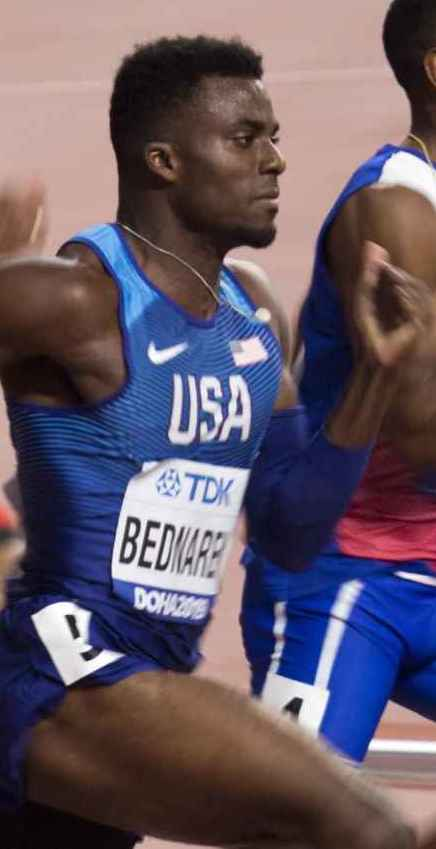
Bednarek at the 2019 World Athletics Championships

In July 2019, he left Indian Hills and signed a pro contract with Nike and began training in Florida with former world champion sprinter and Olympic medalist Justin Gatlin. “It wasn’t my decision," he said. "But you know Nike wanted to send me somewhere so I just kind of listened. So you know, they know what they’re doing. It’s all you know just going to trust the process.”

He said that he came out of high school as a 400-meter specialist but transitioned successfully into the 200-meters. "So I kind of want to continue that, maybe in the years to come try to do the 100, but yeah I think the 200 is my main event right now,” he said in July 2019.

At the 2019 USA Outdoor Track and Field Championships, Bednarek qualified for the 200 meters final. In the final, he pulled up with a hamstring injury but jogged across the finish line. Later in the season, winner Noah Lyles won the 2019 IAAF Diamond League 200 m title, entitling him to a wild card to the 2019 World Athletics Championships. USA was thus allowed an additional entry. By virtue of Bednarek being the fourth person to cross the finish line at the National Championships with a qualifying time, he was given the position into the World Championships. Weeks after his injury, Bednarek was only able to muster a non-qualifying 21.50 in his heat due to a nerve flare up.

On August 10, 2020, in the COVID-19 abbreviated season, Bednarek ran a world leading 19.80 (+1.0) at the Star Athletics Sprint Showcase in Montverde, Florida. The time moved him up to a tie for the #25 mark of all time.

On 4 August 2021, Bednarek won the silver medal at the 2020 Tokyo Olympics in the 200-meter men's final with a time of 19.68 seconds. On Sept. 9, 2021, Bednarek clinched the Diamond League 200 meter title at the Weltklasse in Zürich, winning with a time of 19.70s. During 2021, Bednarek ran the most sub-20 performances over 200 meters, both for wind-legal conditions and all conditions, of any athlete in a single season, with 12 total sub-20 performances, of which 10 were wind-legal. He ended the season ranked No. 1 in the 200 meters by World Athletics.

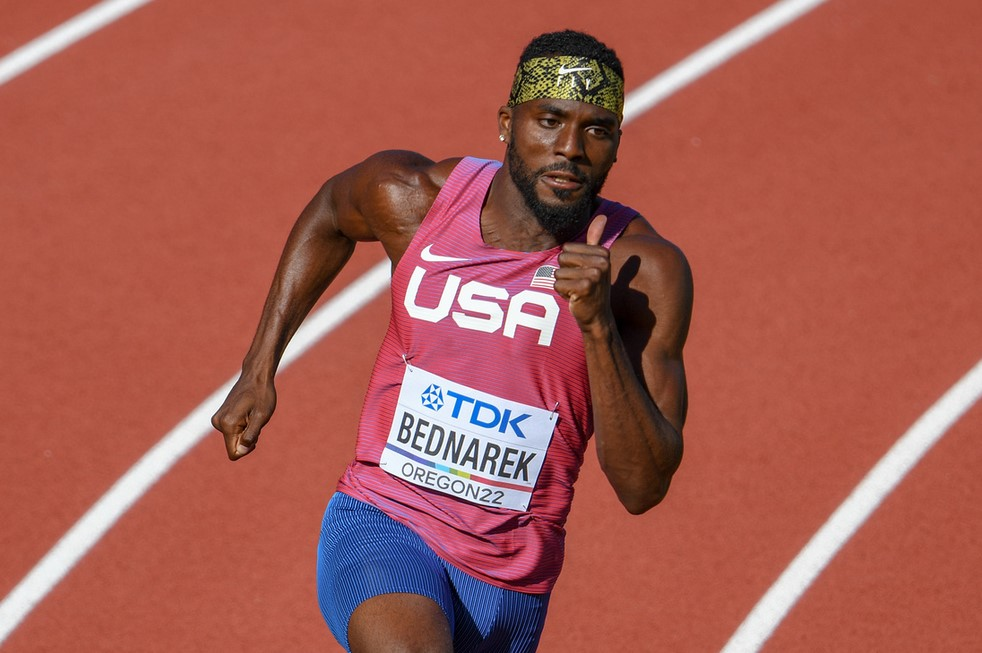
Bednarek running the 200 meters at the 2022 World Athletics Championships

On July 21, 2022, in Eugene, Ore., Bednarek took silver in the 200 meters at the 2022 World Athletics Championships with a time of 19.77. Noah Lyles, whom he had defeated in Tokyo, set an American record of 19.31 in the race.

In 2024, Bednarek qualified for the Olympic team by placing second at the Olympic trials in the 100 and 200 m. Noah Lyles won both races. In the 200m, both Lyles and Bednarek went under Michael Johnson's 1996 meet record of 19.66. Lyles edged Bednarek, running 19.53 to Bednarek's 19.59, a personal record. While Bednarek had made the last 3 World Championship or Olympic teams in the 200 m, this was the first time he had made a 100 m global team. Bednarek also ran a personal best of 9.87 in the 100 m final. At the Paris Olympics, Bednarek qualified for the 100 m final, where he placed 7th in a time of 9.88. Bednarek also qualified for the 200m final, by winning his semi-final in 20.00s. In the final he won the silver medal in a time of 19.62, finishing behind Letsile Tebogo.

In September 2024, it was announced that he had signed up for the inaugural season of the Michael Johnson founded Grand Slam Track. At the Kingston Slam held in April 2025, Bednarek won in his category, having won both the 100 m and 200 m. He also won his event category in the Miami Slam and Philadelphia Slam, later being crowned Racer of the Year for the 2025 Grand Slam Track season.

On August 1, 2025, at the 2025 USA Outdoor Track and Field Championships, Bednarek won a national title over the 100 meters, running 9.79. This time ties Bednarek with Noah Lyles and Maurice Greene as the sixth fastest American in history.

== Personal life ==
Bednarek's nickname is "Kung Fu Kenny" because he wears a Rambo-like tie around his head in races.

He has a pet Husky named Rambo.

Bednarek is Catholic. He is dating Indian golfer Sharmila Nicollet.

== Statistics ==
Information from his World Athletics profile unless otherwise noted.

=== Personal bests ===
Type	Distance	Time (s)	Wind (m/s)	Venue	Date	Notes
Individual events
Outdoor	100 metres	9.79	+1.8	Eugene, United States	1 August 2025	
Outdoor	200 metres	19.52	-0.1	Budapest, Hungary	13 September 2026	
Outdoor	400 metres	44.73	—N/a	Hobbs, United States	18 May 2019	
Team events
Outdoor	4 × 100 metres relay	37.29	—N/a	Tokyo, Japan	21 September 2025	

=== International competitions ===
Representing the United States
Year	Competition	Venue	Position	Event	Time	Notes
2019	World Championships	Doha, Qatar	46th (h)	200 m	21.50	
2021	Olympic Games	Tokyo, Japan	2nd	200 m	19.68	PB
2022	World Championships	Eugene, United States	2nd	200 m	19.77	SB
2023	World Championships	Budapest, Hungary	5th	200 m	20.07	
2024	World Relays	Nassau, Bahamas	1st	4 × 100 m relay	37.40	WL
2024	Olympic Games	Paris, France	7th	100 m	9.88	
2024	Olympic Games	Paris, France	2nd	200 m	19.62	
2024	Olympic Games	Paris, France	—	4 × 100 m relay	DQ	TR 24.7
2025	World Relays	Guangzhou, China	2nd	4 × 100 m relay	37.66	SB
2025	World Championships	Tokyo, Japan	4th	100 m	9.92	
2025	World Championships	Tokyo, Japan	2nd	200 m	19.58	SB
2025	World Championships	Tokyo, Japan	1st	4 × 100 m relay	37.29	WL
2026	World Ultimate Championship	Budapest, Hungary	1st	100 m	9.85	SB
2026	World Ultimate Championship	Budapest, Hungary	1st	200 m	19.52	WL

=== Circuit wins and titles ===
- Diamond League 200 metres champion (3): 2021, 2024, 2026
  - 2021 (4): Gateshead, Doha, Lausanne, Zürich
  - 2022 (1): Rabat
  - 2023 (1): Brussels
  - 2024 (3): Doha, Eugene, Brussels
  - 2026 (4): Rabat, Stockholm, Zürich, Brussels

Grand Slam Track results
Slam	Race group	Event	Pl.	Time	Prize money
2025 Kingston Slam	Short sprints	100 m	1st	10.07	US$100,000
2025 Kingston Slam	Short sprints	200 m	1st	20.07	US$100,000
2025 Miami Slam	Short sprints	100 m	1st	9.79	US$100,000
2025 Miami Slam	Short sprints	200 m	1st	19.84	US$100,000
2025 Philadelphia Slam	Short sprints	200 m	1st	19.95	US$100,000
2025 Philadelphia Slam	Short sprints	100 m	1st	9.86	US$100,000

=== National championships and competitions ===
Year	Competition	Venue	Position	Event	Time	Notes
2019	USA Championships	Des Moines, Iowa	8th	200 m	45.34	
2021	U.S. Olympic Trials	Eugene, Oregon	4th	100 m	9.89	PB
2021	U.S. Olympic Trials	Eugene, Oregon	2nd	200 m	19.78	PB
2022	USA Championships	Eugene, Oregon	7th	100 m	9.98	
2022	USA Championships	Eugene, Oregon	4th	200 m	19.87	
2023	USA Championships	Eugene, Oregon	2nd	200 m	19.82	
2024	U.S. Olympic Trials	Eugene, Oregon	2nd	100 m	9.87	PB
2024	U.S. Olympic Trials	Eugene, Oregon	2nd	200 m	19.59	PB
2025	USA Championships	Eugene, Oregon	1st	100 m	9.79	PB
2025	USA Championships	Eugene, Oregon	2nd	200 m	19.67	SB
2026	USA Championships	New York, New York	3rd	100 m	9.88	
