= Udodi Onwuzurike =

Nigerian-American sprinter (born 2003)

Personal information
- Full name: Udodi Chudi Onwuzurike
- Nationality: American, Nigerian
- Born: 29 January 2003 (age 23) Detroit, Michigan, U.S.
- Height: 1.83 m (6 ft 0 in)
- Weight: 70 kg (154 lb)

Sport
- Country: Nigeria
- Sport: Athletics
- Event: Sprinting
- Club: Stanford Cardinal

Achievements and titles
- Personal bests: 100 m: 9.92 +1.4 (2023); 200 m: 19.76 +0.6 (2023)
Medal record
Commonwealth Games
| Silver medal – second place | 2026 Glasgow | 200m |
| Bronze medal – third place | 2022 Birmingham | 4×100 m relay |
World U20 Championships
| Gold medal – first place | 2021 Nairobi | 200 m |

Udodi Chudi Onwuzurike (born 29 January 2003) is a sprinter who specializes in the 200 metres. Born in the United States, he represents Nigeria internationally. He was the gold medallist at the World Athletics U20 Championships in 2021. Onwuzurike competes collegiately for Stanford University and is an alumnus of Brother Rice High School in Bloomfield Hills, Michigan.

On 26 May 2023, he ran the 100 metres in 9.92 seconds at Sacramento becoming the 50th man to break 10 seconds for 100 metres and 20 seconds for 200 metres.

== Early life ==
Born in Detroit, Michigan, USA, to Nigerian parents, Udodi Chudi Onwuzurike holds dual citizenship, but his allegiance has always been with Nigeria, the country of his heritage. Growing up, Onwuzurike competed in various sports. He attended Brother Rice High School, where he began to focus on sprinting and achieved notable results at the high school level.

He has cited Nigerian sprinters such as Olusoji Fasuba as influences.

== Career ==
=== Junior Career ===
At the 2021 World Athletics U20 Championships in Nairobi, Kenya, Onwuzurike won the 200 meters event in a time of 20.21 seconds. He became the first Nigerian male sprinter to win a gold medal in the 200 m at the World U20 Championships. Onwuzurike also competed in the 100 meters, where he advanced to the semifinals.

=== College Career ===
Onwuzurike accepted an athletic scholarship to Stanford University and was an All-American sprinter for the Stanford Cardinal track and field team.

=== Senior Career ===
Onwuzurike has represented Nigeria at several major international competitions, including 2022 Commonwealth Games and the 2022 African Championships in Athletics. At the 2022 African Championships in Mauritius, he reached the finals in the 200 meters. He finished fourth.

At the 2023 African Games in Accra, Ghana, Onwuzurike competed in both the 100 m and 200 m events. He advanced to the finals in both events.

He competed in the 200 Meter at the 2024 Summer Olympics in Paris. He placed fifth in his heat, then won his repechage heat to qualify for the semi-final where he was eliminated by placing last.

At the 2026 Commonwealth Games held in Glasgow, in the 200 meters, he finished second, claiming the silver medal with a season's best time of 22.09 seconds. In the final of the 4 × 100 metres relay, he helped lead the Nigerian team to the bronze medal, finishing behind Canada and Australia.

== Personal bests ==
Udodi Chudi Onwuzurike’s personal best in the 100 meters is 9.92 seconds, a time he achieved in 2023. In the 200 meters, his personal best is 19.76 seconds, set during the 2022 season.

Grand Slam Track results
| Slam | Race group | Event | Pl. | Time | Prize money |
|---|---|---|---|---|---|
| 2025 Philadelphia Slam | Short sprints | 200 m | 7th | 20.67 | US$12,500 |
| 2025 Philadelphia Slam | Short sprints | 100 m | 6th | 10.20 | US$12,500 |
