= Luxolo Adams =

South African sprinter

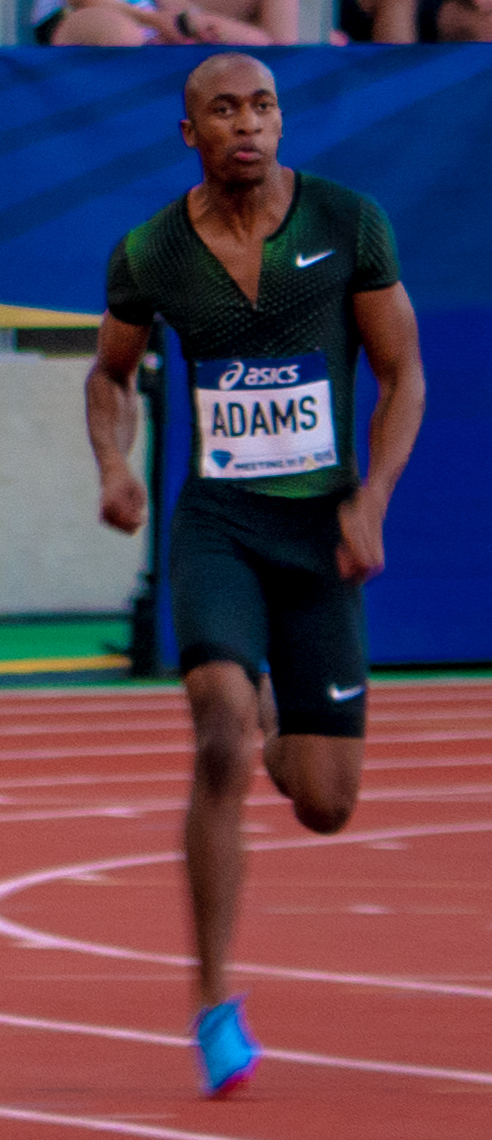

Personal information
- Nationality: South African
- Born: 1 August 1996 (age 30) Burgersdorp, South Africa

Sport
- Country: South Africa
- Sport: Athletics
- Event: Sprint

Achievements and titles
- Personal bests: 200 m – 19.82 (2022); 400 m – 46.37 (2015)
Medal record
Men's athletics
Representing South Africa
African Championships
Bronze medal – third place	2018 Asaba	200 m

Luxolo Adams (born 1 August 1996) is a South African sprinter. He won a silver medal in Men's 200 m at the inaugural Athletics World Cup in 2018. In 2018 he competed at the African Championships in Asaba and won the bronze medal in the 200 metres.

In June 2022, he ran a personal best of 19.82 seconds for the 200 m to win the Paris Diamond League, defeating reigning Olympic champion Andre de Grasse in the race while recording the second-best mark in South African history.

In 2024, Luxolo Adams experienced a notable setback when he was left out of the South African team for the Paris Olympics. Although he qualified the previous year with a time of 20.15, he struggled with injuries for the majority of 2024, only achieving a season's best of 21.31 in July. Athletics South Africa stated that his exclusion was due to his lack of fitness and failure to recover from injuries in time. At the time, he was ranked 71st in South Africa and 1355th in the world for the 200 meters.
