= Sinesipho Dambile =

South African sprinter

- Dambile at the 2026 Weltklasse Zürich

Personal information
- Born: 2 March 2002 (age 24) Qonce, Eastern Cape, South Africa
- Education: University of Pretoria
- Height: 6 ft 1 in (1.86 m)

Sport
- Country: South Africa
- Sport: Athletics
- Events: 200 metres, 400 metres
- Coached by: Thabo Matebedi
Medal record
Representing South Africa
Commonwealth Games
| Gold medal – first place | 2026 Glasgow | 200 m |
World U20 Championships
| Gold medal – first place | 2021 Nairobi | 4 × 100 m relay |
| Bronze medal – third place | 2021 Nairobi | 200 m |
World Relays
| Gold medal – first place | 2025 Guangzhou | 4 × 100 m relay |
| Silver medal – second place | 2019 Yokohama | 4×200 m relay |

Sinesipho Dambile (born 2 March 2002) is a South African sprinter competing primarily in the 200 metres. He competed in the 200 metres at the 2022 World Athletics Championships.

He became the first South African to win 200m gold at the 2026 Commonwealth games in a time of 19.96.

== Career ==
He won the 200m national title at the 2025 South African National Championships in a time of 20.11 which qualified him for the World Athletics Championships in Tokyo.

In 2026, he finished in second behind Olympic champion Letsile Tebogo in the 200m Diamond League in Oslo in a time of 20.10.

== Personal bests ==
Outdoor

- 100 metres – 10.22 (Pretoria 2025)
- 200 metres – 19.74 (Doha 2026)
- 300 metres – 32.10 (Pretoria 2020)
- 400 metres – 45.46 (Pretoria 2025)
