= Letsile Tebogo =

Sprinter from Botswana (born 2003)

Letsile Tebogo OLY
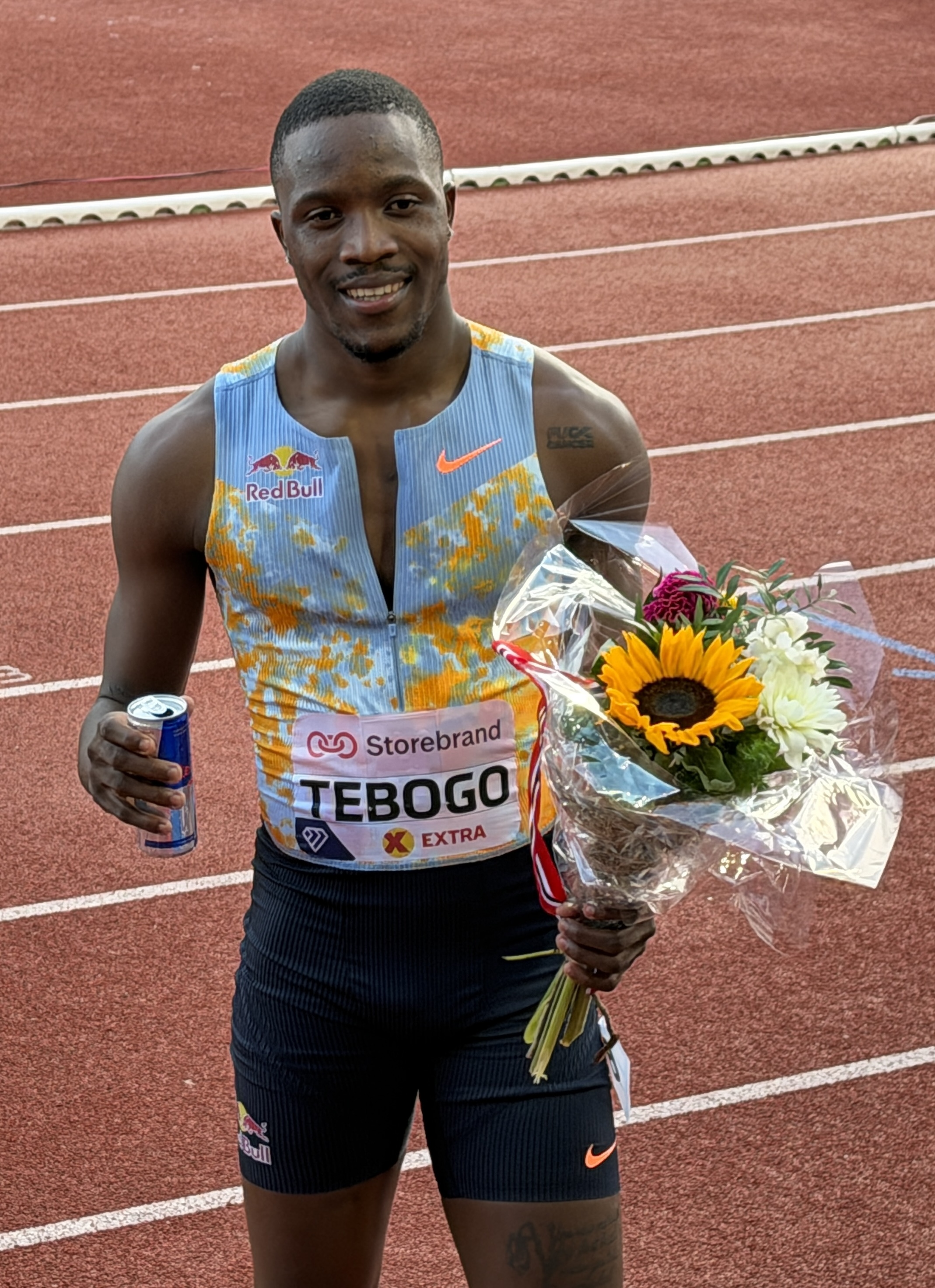
- Tebogo at the 2026 Bislett Games

Personal information
- Nickname: School-boy
- Nationality: Botswana
- Born: 7 June 2003 (age 23) Kanye, Botswana
- Height: 1.84 m (6 ft 0 in)
- Weight: 77 kg (170 lb)

Sport
- Country: Botswana
- Sport: Athletics
- Event: Sprints
- Team: Nike

Achievements and titles
- Personal bests: 100 m: 9.86 NR (Paris 2024); 200 m: 19.46 AR (Paris 2024); 300 m: 30.69 WB (Pretoria 2024); 400 m: 44.29 (Pretoria 2024)
Medal record
Men's athletics
Representing Botswana
Olympic Games
Gold medal – first place	2024 Paris	200 m
Silver medal – second place	2024 Paris	4 × 400 m relay
World Championships
Gold medal – first place	2025 Tokyo	4 × 400 m relay
Silver medal – second place	2023 Budapest	100 m
Bronze medal – third place	2023 Budapest	200 m
World Relays
Gold medal – first place	2024 Nassau	4 × 400 m relay
Gold medal – first place	2026 Gaborone	4 × 400 m relay
African Championships
Gold medal – first place	2022 Saint Pierre	200 m
World U20 Championships
Gold medal – first place	2021 Nairobi	100 m
Gold medal – first place	2022 Cali	100 m
Silver medal – second place	2021 Nairobi	200 m
Silver medal – second place	2022 Cali	200 m

Letsile Tebogo (Tswana pronunciation: [lɪt͡silɛ tɛbʊχo]; born 7 June 2003) is a Botswana sprinter. He won the gold medal at the 2024 Summer Olympics in the 200 metres event, with his win earning the first-ever Olympic gold medal for Botswana. He also won the silver medal at the 2023 World Championships in the 100 m and followed it up with a bronze medal in the 200 m five days later.

Tebogo won in the 100 metres and placed second in the 200 metres at both the 2021 and 2022 World Athletics Under-20 Championships. In 2021, he became the first Botswana athlete to claim the 100 m title at any World Championships level. He is the 200 m 2022 African champion, becoming the youngest winner of this title in competition history. He broke the 300 m world best, running a time of 30.69 seconds on 17 February 2024 at altitude in Pretoria, South Africa.

Tebogo has held the world U20 record in the 100 m since April 2022. He was the first man from Botswana to break the 10-second barrier.

== Career ==
Tebogo gained his first international experience at the age of 17 at the 2021 World Athletics Relays held in May in Chorzów, Poland. In August, he competed at the World Under-20 Championships in Nairobi, Kenya, winning the 100 metres and finishing second in the 200 metres.

On 19 February 2022, the 18-year-old set a new national record in the 100 m at the Botswana Athletics Championships with a time of 10.08 seconds. Two months later, he became the first man from Botswana to break the 10-second barrier at the event as he clocked a time of 9.96 seconds at the Gaborone International Meet, setting a new world under-20 record. On 15 July, he further improved his record in his debut race at the World Athletics Championships held in Eugene, Oregon, with a time of 9.94 seconds. The following month, he broke his own record again, clocking a 9.91 second performance in the final of the World U20 Championships in Cali, Colombia. At the end of the race he celebrated early, drawing comparisons to 100 m and 200 m world records holder Usain Bolt.

On 8 August 2024, Tebogo won the 200 m final at the Paris Olympics, earning the first-ever gold medal for Botswana with a time of 19.46s. His victory led to a holiday being declared in Botswana to celebrate his feat on the afternoon of 9 August. The government of Botswana also awarded him two houses in recognition of his victory.

In September 2024, Tebogo became the first male winner of the newly inaugurated Jesse Owens Rising Star Award at the Wanda Diamond League Final in Brussel. The 21-year-old's 19.80 was the best performance of the final by a male athlete aged 23 or under, even though he did not win the final. In the next month, for his historic achievement as an Olympic champion for Botswana, Tebogo received the Association of National Olympic Committees (ANOC) award for best male athlete of Paris 2024.

In December 2024, Tebogo was named World Athletics Male Athlete of the Year.

During the Botswana floods that took place in February 2025, Tebogo was praised for pulling cars out of floods in Gaborone.

In April 2025, Olympic champion Tebogo was appointed as the Kids’ Athletics Day 2025 ambassador by World Athletics.

At the 2025 World Athletics Championships, held in Tokyo, Japan, Tebogo was disqualified from the 100 metres final, after a false start. He then qualified for the 200 m final, where he finished fourth behind Noah Lyles, Kenneth Bednarek, and Bryan Levell. On 21 September 2025, running the second leg, he helped Botswana win the 4 × 400 m relay with the team recording a winning time of 2:57.76. The team consisted of Tebogo, Collen Kebinatshipi, Bayapo Ndori, and Lee Eppie.

In May 2026, Tebogo ran the second leg of the 4 × 400 m relay at the 2026 World Athletics Relays in Gaborone, Botswana, in front of a home crowd. The team ran a final time of 2:54.47, a competition record and the third fastest performance in the event ever at the time.

== Achievements ==
=== Personal bests ===
Distance	Time (s)	Wind	Location	Date	Notes
100 meters	9.86	+1.0 m/s	Paris, France	4 August 2024	NR
200 meters	19.46	+0.4 m/s	Paris, France	8 August 2024	NR, AR
300 meters	30.69		Pretoria, South Africa	17 February 2024	WB
400 meters	44.29		Pretoria, South Africa	18 March 2024	
Youth and junior achievements
100 meters	9.91	+0.8 m/s	Cali, Colombia	2 August 2022	World under-20 record
200 meters	19.96	-1.0 m/s	Cali, Colombia	4 August 2022	AU20R

=== International competitions ===
Representing Botswana
Year	Competition	Venue	Position	Event	Time	Notes
2021	World Relays	Chorzów, Poland	13th (h)	4 × 100 m relay	39.55	SB
2021	World U20 Championships	Nairobi, Kenya	1st	100 m	10.19	
2021	World U20 Championships	Nairobi, Kenya	2nd	200 m	20.38	
2022	African Championships	Saint Pierre, Mauritius	1st	200 m	20.26	
2022	African Championships	Saint Pierre, Mauritius	– (f)	4 × 100 m relay	DQ	
2022	World Championships	Eugene, OR, United States	16th (sf)	100 m	10.17	(h: WU20R NR (Note: In the heats Tebogo set a world under-20 and national record with a time of 9.94 seconds.))
2022	World U20 Championships	Cali, Colombia	1st	100 m	9.91	CR WU20R NR
2022	World U20 Championships	Cali, Colombia	2nd	200 m	19.96	CR
2023	World Championships	Budapest, Hungary	2nd	100 m	9.88	NR
2023	World Championships	Budapest, Hungary	3rd	200 m	19.81	
2024	World Relays	Nassau, Bahamas	1st	4 × 400 m relay	2:59.11	
2024	Olympic Games	Paris, France	6th	100 m	9.86	NR
2024	Olympic Games	Paris, France	1st	200 m	19.46	AR
2024	Olympic Games	Paris, France	2nd	4 × 400 m relay	2:54.53	AR
2025	World Championships	Tokyo, Japan	—	100 m	DQ	False start
2025	World Championships	Tokyo, Japan	4th	200 m	19.65	
2025	World Championships	Tokyo, Japan	1st	4 × 400 m	2:57.76	
2026	World Relays	Gaborone, Botswana	1st	4 × 400 m relay	2:54.47	AR
2026	World Relays	Gaborone, Botswana	6th	4 × 100 m relay	38.35	(h: NR 37.97) (Note: In the heats, the Botswana team set a national record of 37.97 seconds.)
2026	World Ultimate Championship	Budapest, Hungary	7th	100 m	10.07	
2026	World Ultimate Championship	Budapest, Hungary	2nd	200 m	19.76	

=== Circuit wins and titles ===
- Diamond League

- 2023: Lausanne Athletissima (200 m)
- 2024: Monaco Herculis (200 m), Lausanne Athletissima (200 m), Kamila Skolimowska Memorial (200 m), Rome Golden Gala (100 m), Zürich Weltklasse (200 m)
- 2025: Doha Diamond League (200 m), Prefontaine Classic (200 m)
- 2026: Bislett Games (200 m), Lausanne Athletissima (200 m)

- World Athletics Continental Tour

- 2023: Botswana Golden Grand Prix (200 m)
- 2024: Grand Prix Lombardia Brescia (200 m)
- 2025: Botswana Golden Grand Prix (200 m)

== See also ==
- List of Botswana records in athletics

== Notes ==
Olympic Games
Preceded by Rajab Mahommed; Amantle Montsho	Flag bearer for Botswana; Paris 2024 with Maxine Egner	Succeeded by Incumbent
Records
Preceded by (United States) Trayvon Bromell	Men's under-20 world record holder 100 meters 30 April 2022 – present	Incumbent
Preceded by (South Africa) Wayde van Niekerk	World best performances, 300 metres 17 February 2024 – present	Incumbent
