= Tarsis Orogot =

Ugandan sprinter

Personal information
- Nationality: Ugandan
- Born: 24 November 2002 (age 22)

Sport
- Sport: Sprinting
- Event(s): 100 and 200 metres

Tarsis Gracious Orogot (born 24 November 2002 in Aukot Gweri Soroti district) is an Olympic Ugandan sprinter.

Orogot gained his first experience at international championships in 2021, when he finished fourth in the 200 meter dash at the U20 World Championships in Nairobi in 20.57 s and set a Ugandan national record in the semifinals with 20.37 s. He also reached the semifinals in the 100m, where he was eliminated with a time of 10.37s. He represented Uganda at the 2022 World Athletics Championships.

Orogot is the first Male Ugandan Sprinter in history to compete in the 200m at any World Athletics Championships.

In 2023, running for the University of Alabama, he ran 20.17 for 200m indoors to set a world-leading mark in Albuquerque. This mark is a Ugandan record. And he later became the first East African in history to break the 20 second barrier in the 200m in a time of 19.94 (+0.4) at the 2023 NCAA CHAMPIONSHIPS.

He set a new national record running 19.75 s for the 200 m at the SEC Championship in Gainesville, FL on 11 May 2024. Qualifying for his first Olympic Games in Paris 2024

The previous year on 14 April 2023 he had set a track record for Gainesville by running 19.60 sec with a following wind of 2.9 m/s.

== Personal bests ==
- 100 m: 10.06sec (+0.8 m/s), 11 May 2024 in Percy Beard Track, Gainesville, FL (USA)(Ugandan record)
- 200 m: 19.75 sec (+1.0 m/s), 11 May 2024 at the SEC Championship in Gainesville, FL (Ugandan record) [4]
