= Mixed 4 × 100 metres relay =

Mixed-sex athletics event

Athletics Mixed 4 × 100 metres relay

World records
- Mixed: Jamaica 39.62 (2026); Ackeem Blake (M); Tina Clayton (F); Kadrian Goldson (M); Tia Clayton (F)

The mixed 4 × 100 metres relay is a mixed-sex 4 × 100 metres relay in which teams field two men and two women. Initially, teams were free to arrange participants in any order. As of the year 2026, there is no specific order in which sprinters are mandated to run, although the most common order is man-woman-man-woman. The event is most consistently held at the World Athletics Relays. From 2 to 3 May 2026 three world records in the event were broken, the first by team Canada, the second and third by team Jamaica, with the Jamaican team being the first nation to record a sub-40 in the event.

== Area records ==
- Updated August 2026.

Area	Time (s)	Year	Athletes	Team
Africa (records)	40.24	2026	Favour Ashe, Obi Jennifer Chukwuka, Chidera Ezeakor, Maria Omokwe	Nigeria
Asia (records)	40.55	2025	Tan Mengyi, Yuan Qiqi, Lu Weiyi, Sui Gaofei	China
Europe (records)	39.97	2026	Jeremiah Azu, Dina Asher-Smith, Zharnel Hughes, Amy Hunt	Great Britain
North, Central America and Caribbean (records)	39.62 WR	2026	Ackeem Blake, Tina Clayton, Kadrian Goldson, Tia Clayton	Jamaica
Oceania (records)	40.78	2026	Jai Gordon, Lakara Stallan, Calab Law, Chloe Mannix-Power	Australia
South America (records)	40.99	2026	Erik Cardoso, Gabriela Mourão, Jorge Vides, Ana Azevedo	Brazil

== All-Time Top 10 by Country ==
- Correct as of August 2026.

Rank	Time	Team	Nation	Date	Place	Ref.
1	39.62	Ackeem Blake, Tina Clayton, Kadrian Goldson, Tia Clayton	Jamaica	3 May 2026	Gaborone	
2	39.64	Ronnie Baker, Anavia Battle, Courtney Lindsey, Kayla White	United States	11 September 2026	Budapest	
3	39.97	Jeremiah Azu, Dina Asher-Smith, Zharnel Hughes, Amy Hunt	Great Britain	16 August 2026	Birmingham	
4	40.07	Eliezer Adjibi, Marie-Éloïse Leclair, Duan Asemota, Audrey Leduc	Canada	2 May 2026	Gaborone	
5	40.11	Kevin Kranz, Rebekka Haase, Heiko Gussmann, Gina Lückenkemper	Germany	16 August 2026	Birmingham	
6	40.20	Nsikak Ekpo, Minke Bisschops, Xavi Mo-Ajok, Isabel van den Berg	Netherlands	2 May 2026	Gaborone	
7	40.24	Favour Ashe, Obi Jennifer Chukwuka, Chidera Ezeakor, Maria Omokwe	Nigeria	2 May 2026	Gaborone	
8	40.42	Guillem Crespí, María Isabel Pérez, Andoni Calbano, Jaël Bestué	Spain	16 August 2026	Birmingham	
9	40.54	Ylann Bizasene, Gémima Joseph, Théo Schaub, Hélène Parisot	France	2 May 2026	Gaborone	
10	40.55	Tan Mengyi, Yuan Qiqi, Lu Weiyi, Sui Gaofei	China	8 August 2025	Shaoxing	

== All-Time Top 25 ==
- Correct as of September 2026.

Rank	Time	Team	Nation	Date	Place	Ref.
1	39.62	Ackeem Blake, Tina Clayton, Kadrian Goldson, Tia Clayton	Jamaica	3 May 2026	Gaborone	
2	39.64	Ronnie Baker, Anavia Battle, Courtney Lindsey, Kayla White	United States	11 September 2026	Budapest	
3	39.72	Ackeem Blake, Tina Clayton, Kadrian Goldson, Jonielle Smith	Jamaica	11 September 2026	Budapest	
4	39.97	Jeremiah Azu, Dina Asher-Smith, Zharnel Hughes, Amy Hunt	Great Britain	16 August 2026	Birmingham	
5	39.99	Ackeem Blake, Tina Clayton, Kadrian Goldson, Tia Clayton	Jamaica	2 May 2026	Gaborone	
6	40.07	Eliezer Adjibi, Marie-Éloïse Leclair, Duan Asemota, Audrey Leduc	Canada	2 May 2026	Gaborone	
7	40.11	Kevin Kranz, Rebekka Haase, Heiko Gussmann, Gina Lückenkemper	Germany	16 August 2026	Birmingham	
8	40.15	Yannick Wolf, Sophia Junk, Heiko Gussmann, Sina Kammerschmitt	Germany	2 May 2026	Gaborone	
9	40.20	Nsikak Ekpo, Minke Bisschops, Xavi Mo-Ajok, Isabel van den Berg	Netherlands	2 May 2026	Gaborone	
10	40.23	Eliezer Adjibi, Marie-Éloïse Leclair, Duan Asemota, Audrey Leduc	Canada	3 May 2026	Gaborone	
11	40.24	Favour Ashe, Obi Jennifer Chukwuka, Chidera Ezeakor, Maria Omokwe	Nigeria	2 May 2026	Gaborone	
12	40.26	Romell Glave, Imani Lansiquot, Jeremiah Azu, Success Eduan	Great Britain	11 September 2026	Budapest	
13	40.30	Sade McCreath, Marie-Éloïse Leclair, Duan Asemota, Eliezer Adjibi	Canada	11 May 2025	Guangzhou	
14	40.33	Courtney Lindsey, Jada Mowatt, Kyree King, E'Lexis Hollis	United States	3 May 2026	Gaborone	
15	40.34	Eliezer Adjibi, Audrey Leduc, Brendon Rodney, Sade McCreath	Canada	11 September 2026	Budapest	
16	40.36	Courtney Lindsey, Jada Mowatt, Kyree King, E'Lexis Hollis	United States	2 May 2026	Gaborone	
17	40.42	Guillem Crespí, María Isabel Pérez, Andoni Calbano, Jaël Bestué	Spain	16 August 2026	Birmingham	
18	40.44	Serena Cole, Krystal Sloley, Javari Thomas, Bryan Levell	Jamaica	11 May 2025	Guangzhou	
19	40.51	Guillem Crespí, María Isabel Pérez, Andoni Calbano, Jaël Bestué	Spain	2 May 2026	Gaborone	
20	40.52	Yannick Wolf, Chelsea Kadiri, Heiko Gussmann, Sina Kammerschmitt	Germany	3 May 2026	Gaborone	
21	40.54	Ylann Bizasene, Gémima Joseph, Théo Schaub, Hélène Parisot	France	2 May 2026	Gaborone	
22	40.55	Tan Mengyi, Yuan Qiqi, Lu Weiyi, Sui Gaofei	(China) Jiangsu	8 August 2025	Shaoxing	
23	40.65	Guillem Crespí, María Isabel Pérez, Andoni Calbano, Jaël Bestué	Spain	11 September 2026	Budapest	
24	40.69	Junior Tardioli, Elisa Valensin, Andrea Bernardi, Zaynab Dosso	Italy	3 May 2026	Gaborone	
25	40.72	Jona Efoloko, Alyson Bell, Jeriel Quainoo, Kissiwaa Mensah	Great Britain	3 May 2026	Gaborone	
