= List of Central American and Caribbean under-23 bests in athletics =

CAC U23 bests in the sport of athletics are the all-time best marks set in competition by aged 22 or younger throughout the entire calendar year of the performance and competing for a member nation of the Central American and Caribbean Athletic Confederation (CACAC). Technically, in all under-23 age divisions, the age is calculated "on December 31 of the year of competition" to avoid age group switching during a competitive season. CACAC doesn't maintain an official list for such performances. All bests shown on this list are tracked by statisticians not officially sanctioned by the governing body.

== Outdoor ==
=== Men ===
Event	Record	Athlete	Nationality	Date	Meet	Place	Age	Ref.
100 m	9.69 (±0.0 m/s)	Usain Bolt	Jamaica	16 August 2008	Olympic Games	Beijing, China	21 years, 361 days	
200 m	19.26 (+0.7 m/s)	Yohan Blake	Jamaica	16 September 2011	Memorial Van Damme	Brussels, Belgium	21 years, 264 days	
400 m	43.74	Kirani James	Grenada	3 July 2014	Athletissima	Lausanne, Switzerland	21 years, 305 days	
800 m								
1500 m								
3000 m								
5000 m								
10,000 m								
Marathon								
110 m hurdles	12.87 (+0.9 m/s)	Dayron Robles	Cuba	6 June 2008	Golden Spike Ostrava	Ostrava, Czech Republic	20 years, 200 days	
300 m hurdles	34.94	Yeral Nuñez	Dominican Republic	1 April 2023	Felix Sánchez Classic	Santo Domingo, Dominican Republic	20 years, 82 days	
400 m hurdles	47.34	Roshawn Clarke	Jamaica	21 August 2023	World Championships	Budapest, Hungary	19 years, 51 days	
3000 m steeplechase								
High jump	2.44 m	Javier Sotomayor	Cuba	29 July 1989	CAC Championships	San Juan, Puerto Rico	21 years, 289 days	
Pole vault								
Long jump	8.68 m (+1.7 m/s)	Juan Miguel Echevarría	Cuba	30 June 2018	25th Weitsprung Meeting	Bad Langensalza, Germany	19 years, 323 days	
Triple jump	18.08 m (±0.0 m/s)	Pedro Pablo Pichardo	Cuba	28 May 2015	Copa Cuba-Memorial Barrientos	Havana, Cuba	21 years, 332 days	
Shot put								
Discus throw								
Hammer throw								
Javelin throw								
Decathlon								
Decathlon	100m (wind) / Long jump (wind) / Shot put / High jump / 400m / 110m H (wind) / Discus / Pole vault / Javelin / 1500m							
5000 m walk (track)	19:34.07	Osvaldo Miramontes	Mexico	8 August 2026	World U20 Championships	Eugene, United States	17 years, 360 days	
10,000 m walk (track)	39:27.10	Emiliano Barba	Mexico	30 August 2024	World U20 Championships	Lima, Peru	17 years, 160 days	
20 km walk (road)								
50 km walk (road)								
4 × 100 m relay	38.61 A	Alexavier Monfried; Bryan Levell; Andrew Gilipps; Sandrey Davison	Jamaica	22 August 2021	World U20 Championships	Nairobi, Kenya	17 years, 242 days 18 years, 209 days	
4 × 400 m relay								

=== Women ===
Event	Record	Athlete	Nationality	Date	Meet	Place	Age	Ref.
100 m	10.77 (+1.7 m/s)	Adaejah Hodge	British Virgin Islands	18 April 2026	Tom Jones Memorial	Gainesville, United States	20 years, 36 days	
200 m	22.10 (+1.9 m/s)	Adaejah Hodge	British Virgin Islands	11 April 2026	Spec Towns Invitational	Athens, United States	20 years, 29 days	
400 m								
800 m								
1500 m								
3000 m								
5000 m								
10,000 m								
Marathon								
100 m hurdles	12.24 (−0.4 m/s)	Ackera Nugent	Jamaica	30 August 2024	Golden Gala	Rome, Italy	22 years, 123 days	
200 m hurdles (straight)	24.86 (+0.1 m/s)	Shiann Salmon	Jamaica	23 May 2021	Adidas Boost Boston Games	Boston, United States	22 years, 53 days	
400 m hurdles								
3000 m steeplechase								
High jump								
Pole vault								
Long jump								
Triple jump								
Shot put								
Discus throw								
Hammer throw								
Javelin throw								
Heptathlon								
Heptathlon	100m H (wind) / High jump / Shot put / 200m (wind) / Long jump (wind) / Javelin / 800m							
10,000 m walk (track)	44:13.88	Alegna González	Mexico	14 July 2018	World U20 Championships	Tampere, Finland	19 years, 193 days	
10 km walk (road)	44:50	Rachelle De Orbeta	Puerto Rico	10 February 2019	Oceania Race Walking Championships	Adelaide, Australia	18 years, 320 days	
20 km walk (road)								
4 × 100 m relay	42.94 A	Serena Cole; Tina Clayton; Kerrica Hill; Tia Clayton	Jamaica	22 August 2021	World U20 Championships	Nairobi, Kenya	17 years, 57 days 17 years, 5 days 16 years, 169 days 17 years, 5 days	
4 × 400 m relay								

== Indoor ==
=== Men ===
Event	Record	Athlete	Nationality	Date	Meet	Place	Age	Ref.
60 m								
200 m								
400 m	44.80	Kirani James	Grenada	27 February 2011	SEC Championships	Fayetteville, United States	18 years, 179 days	
800 m	1:46.20	Andrés Arroyo	Puerto Rico	27 February 2016	SEC Championships	Fayetteville, United States	20 years, 265 days	
1500 m								
3000 m								
60 m hurdles	7.33	Dayron Robles	Cuba	8 February 2008	PSD Bank Meeting	Düsseldorf, Germany	21 years, 81 days	
High jump	2.43 m	Javier Sotomayor	Cuba	4 March 1989	World Championships	Budapest, Hungary	21 years, 142 days	
Pole vault								
Long jump	8.46 m	Juan Echevarría	Cuba	2 March 2018	World Championships	Birmingham, United Kingdom	19 years, 203 days	
Triple jump								
Shot put								
Heptathlon	6272 pts	Ayden Owens-Delerme	Puerto Rico	28–29 January 2022	Razorback Invitational	Fayetteville, United States	21 years, 246 days	
Heptathlon	60m / Long jump / Shot put / High jump / 60m H / Pole vault / 1000m; 6.82 / 7.42 m / 14.74 m / 2.04 m / 7.86 / 4.85 m / 2:35.93							
5000 m walk								
4 × 400 m relay								

=== Women ===
Event	Record	Athlete	Nationality	Date	Meet	Place	Age	Ref.
60 m	6.94 A	Julien Alfred	Saint Lucia	11 March 2023	NCAA Division I Championships	Albuquerque, United States	21 years, 274 days	
200 m	22.01 A	Julien Alfred	Saint Lucia	11 March 2023	NCAA Division I Championships	Albuquerque, United States	21 years, 274 days	
300 m	36.97	Adaejah Hodge	British Virgin Islands	12 January 2024	Virginia Showcase	Virginia Beach, United States	17 years, 305 days	
400 m								
800 m								
1500 m								
3000 m								
60 m hurdles	7.72 A	Ackera Nugent	Jamaica	10 March 2023	NCAA Division I Championships	Albuquerque, United States	20 years, 315 days	
High jump	2.01 m	Ioamnet Quintero	Cuba	5 March 1993		Berlin, Germany	20 years, 178 days	
Pole vault								
Long jump								
Triple jump	14.47 m	Leyanis Perez	Cuba	4 February 2022	Meeting Elite de Miramas	Miramas, France	20 years, 25 days	
Shot put								
Pentathlon								
Pentathlon	60m H / High jump / Shot put / Long jump / 800m							
3000 m walk								
4 × 400 m relay								
