= 2026 African Championships in Athletics – Men's 200 metres =

Men's 200 metres at the 2026 African Championships in Athletics
- Venue: Legon Sports Stadium
- Location: Accra, Ghana
- Dates: 15–16 May
- Competitors: 54 from 33 nations
- Winning time: 20.32

Medalists
gold medal	Cheickna Traore	Ivory Coast
silver medal	Phaezel Selepe	Botswana
bronze medal	Mihlali Xhotyeni	South Africa

The men's 200 metres event at the 2026 African Championships in Athletics was held on 15 and 16 May in Accra, Ghana.

== Results ==
=== Heats ===
Held on 12 May. First 2 of each heat (Q) and the next 8 fastest (q) qualified for the semifinals.
Wind:
Heat 1: -3.5 m/s, Heat 2: -1.2 m/s, Heat 3: -2.1 m/s, Heat 4: -5.1 m/s, Heat 5: -2.8 m/s, Heat 6: -1.8 m/s, Heat 7: -3.0 m/s, Heat 8: -2.3 m/s

Rank	Heat	Athlete	Nationality	Time	Notes
1	6	Cheickna Traore	Ivory Coast	20.59	Q
2	6	Phaezel Selepe	Botswana	20.67	Q
3	3	Methembe Tshuma	Zimbabwe	21.00	Q
4	3	Joseph Paul Amoah	Ghana	21.01	Q
5	2	Kevin Lobatlamang	Botswana	21.02	Q
6	5	Mouhamed Ba	Senegal	21.14	Q
7	7	Charles Matundu	Namibia	21.15	Q
8	3	Calvin Bogosi Omphile	Botswana	21.22	q
9	8	Dennis Mwai	Kenya	21.22	Q
10	4	Marizuk Shaibu	Ghana	21.24	Q
10	6	Guy Maganga Gorra	Gabon	21.24	q
12	1	Mihlali Xhotyeni	South Africa	21.33	Q
12	4	Chidi Okezie	Nigeria	21.33	Q
14	5	Ibrahim Fuseini	Ghana	21.34	Q
15	8	Abdou Aziz Ndiaye	Senegal	21.36	Q
16	5	Ibrahima Hamayadji	Cameroon	21.41	q
17	2	Kossi Médard Nayo	Togo	21.42	Q
17	5	Malek Thiep Deng	South Sudan	21.42	q
19	2	Elkana Sabila	Kenya	21.43	q
20	3	Samuel Chege Waweru	Kenya	21.49	q
21	8	Gary Bibi	Mauritius	21.51	q
22	2	James Taiwo Emmanuel	Nigeria	21.63	q
23	5	Elton Hoeseb	Namibia	21.68	
23	5	Arthur Cissé	Ivory Coast	21.68	
23	7	Choongo Malambo	Zambia	21.68	Q
26	6	Marcos Santos	Angola	21.70	
27	3	Elvis Gaseb	Namibia	21.71	
28	1	Emmanuel Aboda	Uganda	21.75	Q
29	4	Magas Muhamed Traore	Ivory Coast	21.76	
30	3	Jerome Kounou	Benin	21.80	
31	6	Joshan Vencatasamy	Mauritius	21.80	
32	1	Betuel Dikabou	Republic of the Congo	21.84	
33	2	Derick Matutu	Zimbabwe	21.95	
34	8	Onywang Bach	Ethiopia	22.09	
35	7	George Eid	Cape Verde	22.11	
36	4	Duval Tsapzeu	Cameroon	22.15	
37	6	Herve Toumandji	Central African Republic	22.30	
38	7	Nyembu Kazadi	Democratic Republic of the Congo	22.45	
39	2	Konga Maseka	Zambia	22.46	
40	3	Mulumba Mardoche Kanyinda	Democratic Republic of the Congo	22.54	
41	7	Fernando Satetula	Angola	22.72	
42	8	Kun Waar Liem	ART	22.84	
43	6	Elvis Munyingu	Zambia	22.86	
44	7	Ludovic Kilambaye	Chad	22.95	
45	4	Ansu Badjie	Gambia	23.00	
46	2	Vicky Busa Ekoki	Democratic Republic of the Congo	23.01	
4	5	Stern Liffa	Malawi	23.10	
48	3	Theodore Izerimana	Burundi	23.12	
49	4	Beckham da Costa	Guinea-Bissau	23.83	
50	5	Kerfala Camara	Guinea	23.87	
51	8	Gregorio Ndong	Equatorial Guinea	23.99	
52	4	Filipe Eduley	São Tomé and Príncipe	24.10	
	1	Issa Niakh	Senegal	DQ	False start
	2	Yassine Hssine	Morocco	DQ	False start
	1	William Aguessy	Benin	DNS	
	1	Gerren Muwishi	Zimbabwe	DNS	
	1	Usheoritse Itsekiri	Nigeria	DNS	
	1	Arão Adão Simão	Angola	DNS	
	4	Wissy Frank Hoye	Gabon	DNS	
	6	Raphael Ngaguele Mberlina	Cameroon	DNS	
	7	Ally Hamis Gullam	Tanzania	DNS	
	7	Jesus Orphee Topize	Mauritius	DNS	
	8	Hachim Maaroufou	Comoros	DNS	
	8	David Nguema Allogho	Gabon	DNS	

=== Semifinals ===
Held 12 May. First 2 of each semifinal (Q) and the next 2 fastest (q) qualified for the final.
Wind:
Heat 1: -1.0 m/s, Heat 2: -0.5 m/s, Heat 3: -2.3 m/s

Rank	Heat	Athlete	Nationality	Time	Notes
1	2	Phaezel Selepe	Botswana	20.45	Q
2	3	Cheickna Traore	Ivory Coast	20.47	Q
3	3	Mihlali Xhotyeni	South Africa	20.72	Q
4	1	Joseph Paul Amoah	Ghana	20.79	Q
5	2	Mouhamed Ba	Senegal	20.81	Q
6	1	Kevin Lobatlamang	Botswana	20.83	Q
7	2	Guy Maganga Gorra	Gabon	20.84	q
8	3	Chidi Okezie	Nigeria	20.97	q
9	2	Kossi Médard Nayo	Togo	20.98	
10	2	Marizuk Shaibu	Ghana	20.98	
11	3	Ibrahim Fuseini	Ghana	21.01	
12	3	Dennis Mwai	Kenya	21.03	
13	1	Samuel Chege Waweru	Kenya	21.04	
14	1	Abdou Aziz Ndiaye	Senegal	21.09	
15	2	Elkana Sabila	Kenya	21.13	
15	3	Calvin Bogosi Omphile	Botswana	21.13	
17	2	Charles Matundu	Namibia	21.17	
18	1	Gary Bibi	Mauritius	21.24	
19	1	Malek Thiep Deng	South Sudan	21.31	
20	2	Ibrahima Hamayadji	Cameroon	21.36	
21	1	James Taiwo Emmanuel	Nigeria	21.46	
22	3	Choongo Malambo	Zambia	21.58	
23	3	Emmanuel Aboda	Uganda	21.77	
	1	Methembe Tshuma	Zimbabwe	DQ	False start

=== Final ===
Held on 13 May
Wind: NWI

Rank	Heat	Athlete	Nationality	Time	Notes
1st place, gold medalist(s)	7	Cheickna Traore	Ivory Coast	10.26	
2nd place, silver medalist(s)	6	Phaezel Selepe	Botswana	20.43	
3rd place, bronze medalist(s)	3	Mihlali Xhotyeni	South Africa	20.57	
4	4	Kevin Lobatlamang	Botswana	20.73	
5	5	Joseph Paul Amoah	Ghana	20.83	
6	1	Chidi Okezie	Nigeria	20.99	
7	2	Mouhamed Ba	Senegal	21.06	
8	8	Guy Maganga Gorra	Gabon	21.47	
