= 2026 World Athletics Relays – Mixed 4 × 100 metres relay =

Mixed 4 × 100 metres relay at the 2026 World Athletics Relays
- Venue: Botswana National Stadium, Gaborone
- Dates: 2 May (heats); 3 May (repechage round & final)
- Winning time: 39.62 WR

Medalists
gold medal	Ackeem Blake; Tina Clayton; Kadrian Goldson; Tia Clayton	Jamaica
silver medal	Eliezer Adjibi; Marie-Éloïse Leclair; Duan Asemota; Audrey Leduc	Canada
bronze medal	Courtney Lindsey; Jada Mowatt; Kyree King; E'Lexis Hollis	United States

The mixed 4 × 100 metres relay at the 2026 World Athletics Relays was held at the Botswana National Stadium in Gaborone, Botswana on 2 and 3 May 2026.

The event will serve as a qualifying event for the 2026 World Athletics Ultimate Championships in Budapest and the 2027 World Athletics Championships in Beijing. In this context, the top six teams in the final will secure direct entry to Budapest, while the top 12 teams in each event will qualify for Beijing.

== Records ==
Prior to the competition, the records were as follows:

Record	Team	Time	Location	Date
World record	Canada (Sade McCreath, Marie-Éloïse Leclair, Duan Asemota, Eliezer Adjibi)	40.30	Guangzhou, China	11 May 2025
Championships record	Canada (Sade McCreath, Marie-Éloïse Leclair, Duan Asemota, Eliezer Adjibi)	40.30	Guangzhou, China	11 May 2025
2026 World Leading	United States (Marcellus Moore, Anavia Battle, Max Thomas, Samirah Moody)	40.84	Gainesville, United States	4 April 2026

== Qualification ==
The top 8 teams in each event at the 2025 World Athletics Championships automatically qualify for entry to the championships. The remaining teams (up to 24 in total per event ) will be determined through the top lists in the qualification period from 1 January 2025 to 5 April 2026. Host country Botswana can enter with one team in each event, regardless of any entry conditions.

== Program ==
All times are local (UTC+2).

Date	Time	Round
2 May 2026	14:05	Heats
3 May 2026	14:02	Repechage round
3 May 2026	16:05	Final

== Results ==
=== Heats (World Championships Qualifying Round 1) ===
The heats were held on 2 May 2026, starting at 14:05 in the afternoon. Qualification: the first 2 of each heat (WQ) plus 2 fastest times (Wq) qualify to World Athletics Championships and World Athletics Relays Final.

==== Heat 1 ====
Rank	Lane	Nation	Competitors	Time	Notes
1	6	Canada	Eliezer Adjibi, Marie-Éloïse Leclair, Duan Asemota, Audrey Leduc	40.07	WQ, WR
2	8	Germany	Yannick Wolf, Sophia Junk, Heiko Gussmann, Sina Kammerschmitt	40.15	WQ, SB
3	7	Netherlands	Nsikak Ekpo, Minke Bisschops, Xavi Mo-Ajok, Isabel van den Berg	40.20	Wq, SB
4	4	Nigeria	Favour Ashe, Obi Chukwuka, Chidera Ezeakor, Maria Thompson Omokwe	40.24	Wq, SB
5	5	Italy	Junior Tardioli, Elisa Valensin, Andrea Bernardi, Irene Siragusa	40.96	SB
6	2	Portugal	David Landim, Lorène Bazolo, Delvis Santos, Arialis Gandulla	41.45	SB
7	3	Ukraine	Illia Popov, Diana Honcharenko, Oleksandr Sokolov, Danyyila Khavan	41.84	SB

==== Heat 2 ====
Rank	Lane	Nation	Competitors	Time	Notes
1	6	United States	Courtney Lindsey, Jada Mowatt, Kyree King, E'Lexis Hollis	40.36	WQ, SB
2	4	Spain	Guillem Crespí, María Isabel Pérez, Andoni Calbano, Jaël Bestué	40.51	WQ, SB
3	7	France	Ylann Bizasene, Gémima Joseph, Théo Schaub, Hélène Parisot	40.54	SB
4	8	Poland	Jakub Lempach, Aleksandra Piotrowska, Łukasz Żok, Martyna Kotwiła	41.34	SB
5	5	China	Huang Youwen, Xu Jialu, Chang Ji, Kong Lingyao	41.43	SB
6	3	Belgium	Kobe Vleminckx, Lotte Van Lent, Antoine Snyders, Rani Vincke	41.62	SB
7	1	Paraguay	Gustavo Mongelos, Macarena Gimenez, Fredy Maidana, Xenia Hiebert	42.77	SB
	2	India	Tamilarasu Senthilkumar, Nithya Gandhe Animesh Kujur, Sneha Shanuvall	DNF	

==== Heat 3 ====
Rank	Lane	Nation	Competitors	Time	Notes
1	6	Jamaica	Ackeem Blake, Tina Clayton, Kadrian Goldson, Tia Clayton	39.99	WQ, WR
2	7	Great Britain	Jona Efoloko, Alyson Bell, Jeriel Quainoo, Kissiwaa Mensah	40.72	WQ, SB
3	5	Australia	Jai Gordon, Lakara Stallan, Calab Law, Chloe Mannix-Power	40.78	SB
4	4	Kenya	Moses Onyango Wasike, Millicent Ndoro, Dennis Mwai, Mercy Oketch	41.35	SB
5	1	Switzerland	Enrico Güntert, Ajla Del Ponte, Felix Svensson, Salomé Kora	41.49	SB
6	3	Mexico	Brandon Heredia, Yamile Herrera, Gerardo Lomeli Ponce, Alejandra Urias	42.31	SB
7	2	Botswana	Thuto Masasa, Lame Kewamodimo, Calvin Omphile, Tshegofatso Bojosi	42.49	SB
	8	New Zealand	Tiaan Whelpton, Brooke Somerfield, Lex Revell-Lewis, Zoe Hobbs	DNF	

=== Repechage Round (World Championships Qualifying Round 2) ===
The repechage round was held on 3 May 2026, starting at 14:02 in the afternoon. Qualification: First 2 of each heat qualify to World Athletics Championships (WQ).

==== Heat 1 ====
Rank	Lane	Nation	Competitors	Time	Notes
1	5	Italy	Junior Tardioli, Elisa Valensin, Andrea Bernardi, Zaynab Dosso	40.69	WQ, SB
2	8	Portugal	Carlos Nascimento, Tatjana Pinto, Delvis Santos, Arialis Gandulla	40.76	WQ, SB
3	6	France	Ylann Bizasene, Gémima Joseph, Théo Schaub, Hélène Parisot	40.88	
4	3	Belgium	Kobe Vleminckx, Lotte Van Lent, Antoine Snyders, Rani Vincke	40.99	SB
5	2	Ukraine	Illia Popov, Diana Honcharenko, Oleksandr Sokolov, Danyyila Khavan	41.69	SB
6	4	Kenya	Moses Onyango Wasike, Millicent Ndoro, Dennis Mwai, Eunice Kadogo Murandafu	41.84	
7	7	Paraguay	Gustavo Mongelos, Macarena Gimenez, Fredy Maidana, Xenia Hiebert	42.50	SB

==== Heat 2 ====
Rank	Lane	Nation	Competitors	Time	Notes
1	4	Australia	Jai Gordon, Lakara Stallan, Calab Law, Chloe Mannix-Power	40.78	WQ, =SB
2	2	Switzerland	Enrico Güntert, Ajla Del Ponte, Felix Svensson, Salomé Kora	41.02	WQ, NR
3	5	China	Chen Jiapeng, Xu Jialu, Chang Ji, Liu Xiajun	41.23	SB, NR
4	7	New Zealand	Tiaan Whelpton, Brooke Somerfield, Hayato Yoneto, Zoe Hobbs	41.24	SB
5	8	Poland	Łukasz Żok, Magdalena Niemczyk, Dominik Kopeć, Aleksandra Piotrowska	41.26	SB
6	3	India	Ragul Kumar, Nithya Gandhe Animesh Kujur, Sneha Shanuvall	41.35	NR, SB
7	6	Mexico	Brandon Heredia, Yamile Herrera, Gerardo Lomeli Ponce, Alejandra Urias	41.57	SB
8	1	Botswana	Thuto Masasa, Lame Kewamodimo, Xholani Talane, Nono Kesego Kgari	42.66	

=== Final (World Ultimate Championships Qualifying Round) ===
The final was held on 3 May 2026, starting at 16:05 in the afternoon. The first six teams are automatically qualified for the 2026 World Athletics Ultimate Championships.

Rank	Lane	Nation	Competitors	Time	Notes
1st place, gold medalist(s)	6	Jamaica	Ackeem Blake, Tina Clayton, Kadrian Goldson, Tia Clayton	39.62	WR
2nd place, silver medalist(s)	4	Canada	Eliezer Adjibi, Marie-Éloïse Leclair, Duan Asemota, Audrey Leduc	40.23	
3rd place, bronze medalist(s)	5	United States	Courtney Lindsey, Jada Mowatt, Kyree King, E'Lexis Hollis	40.33	SB
4	7	Germany	Yannick Wolf, Chelsea Kadiri, Heiko Gussmann, Sina Kammerschmitt	40.52	
5	8	Spain	Guillem Crespí, Esther Navero, Andoni Calbano, Aitana Rodrigo	41.05	
6	1	Nigeria	Favour Ashe, Obi Chukwuka, Chidera Ezeakor, Maria Thompson Omokwe	42.03	
	3	Great Britain	Elliot Jones, Alyson Bell, Jeriel Quainoo, Desirèe Henry	DNF	
	2	Netherlands	Jaimie Omalla, Minke Bisschops, Nsikak Ekpo, Britt de Blaauw	DNF	
