= Wdowik =

Wdowik is a surname. Notable people with the surname include:

- Bartłomiej Wdowik (born 2000), Polish footballer
- Oliwer Wdowik (born 2002), Polish sprinter
