= Rasheed Foster =

Jamaican sprinter (born 2002)

Personal information
- Born: 23 August 2002 (age 24)

Sport
- Sport: Athletics
- Event: Sprint

Achievements and titles
- Personal bests: 60 m: 6.60 (2026); 100 m: 10.12 (2025); 200 m: 21.40 (2022)
Medal record
Men's athletics
Representing Jamaica
World Relays
Silver medal – second place	2025 Guangzhou	mixed 4 × 100 m relay

Rasheed Foster (born 23 August 2002) is a Jamaican sprinter. He made his senior international debut for Jamaica at the 2025 World Athletics Relays, winning a silver medal in the mixed 4 × 100 metres relay.

== Early life ==
Foster started participating in track and field in 2017. He attended Charlemont High School in Saint Catherine Parish before receiving a scholarship to attend Mico University College in Kingston, Jamaica.

== Career ==
He won back-to-back titles for the Mico University College at the Intercollegiate Track and Field Championships in 2024, running a wind-assisted 100 metres time of 10.12 seconds in April 2024.

In April 2025, he finished first in the College Men's 100 metres race at the Penn State Relays at Frank Forld in Philadelphia. He also helped his MICO University College team capture the College Men's 4 × 100 m relay title.

He was selected for the Jamaican relay pool for the 2025 World Athletics Relays in Guangzhou, China in May 2025. He ran as part of the Jamaican team in the inaugural Mixed 4 × 100 metres race at the event alongside Natasha Morrison, Krystal Sloley and Javari Thomas as the Jamaican quartet won their heat in 41.04 seconds to finish 0.01 ahead of the Great Britain team and recording the second fastest time on the day behind Canada, with the medals decided the following day in the same order.

Foster ran a personal best 6.60 seconds for the 60 metres (+1.4) at the 2026 Gibson McCook Relays in Kingston. He was named in the Jamaica squad for the 2026 World Athletics Relays in Gaborone, Botswana, running on the opening day in the men's 4 x 100 metres alongside Rohan Watson, Odaine McPherson, and Adrian Kerr.
