= Mihlali Xhotyeni =

South African sprinter

Personal information
- Born: 14 April 2003 (age 23)

Sport
- Sport: Track and field
- Events: 100 m, 200 m
Medal record
Men's athletics
Representing South Africa
African Championships
Bronze medal – third place	2026 Accra	200m
World U20 Championships
Gold medal – first place	2021 Nairobi	4×100m

Mihlali Xhotyeni (born 14 April 2003) is a South African sprinter. He won the bronze medal over 200 metres at the 2026 African Championships in Athletics.

== Biography ==
He is from Mthatha and attended Mthatha High School. He later studied at North-West University for a Bachelor of Commerce in Management Sciences with Business Management.

In 2021, Xhotyeni competed at the 2021 World Athletics U20 Championships in Nairobi, Kenya where he won gold medal as part of the South African 4 × 100 m relay team alongside Sinesipho Dambile, Letlhogonolo Moleyane, and Benjamin Richardson, with the relay team breaking the world U20 record, running 38.51 seconds.

In 2026, he won bronze medals in both the 100 m and 200 m at the USSA Championships and also had a third place finish in the 200 m at the South African Championships. In May 2026, he competed at the 2026 African Championships in Athletics in Accra, Ghana, winning the bronze medal behind Cheickna Traore of the Ivory Coast and Phaezel Selepe or Botswana in the 200 metres final, running 20.56 seconds, having qualified from his semi-final in 20.72 seconds.
