= Jada Mowatt =

American sprinter (born 1997)

Personal information
- Born: Jada Baylark; 17 October 1997 (age 28)

Sport
- Sport: Athletics
- Event: Sprint

Achievements and titles
- Personal best(s): 60m: 7.15 (2021); 100m: 10.99 (2025); 200m: 22.86 (2021)
Medal record
Women's athletics
Representing United States
World Relay Championships
Bronze medal – third place	2026 Gaborone	Mixed 4 × 100 m relay

Jada Mowatt (née Baylark born 17 October 1997) is an American sprinter.

== Biography ==
A student at Parkview Arts and Science Magnet High School in Little Rock, Arkansas, she completed in multi-events at high school. She later attended the University of Arkansas and focused on sprinting.

In 2018, she equalled, and then broke, the University of Arkansas record in the 100 metres dash of 11.10 seconds set by Veronica Campbell-Brown in 2004, improving it when she ran 11.04 seconds at the NCAA West Preliminaries in Sacramento. In February 2021 at the SEC Indoor Championships competing in the 60 metres she ran a personal best 7.20 seconds that moved her to equal second on the Arkansas Razorback all-time list, tied with the time Veronica Campbell-Brown set in 2004. The following month, she was a finalist at the 2021 NCAA Division I Indoor Championships, and lowered her personal best for the 60 m to 7.15 seconds, helping Arkansas to win the women’s team title.

In June 2024, she was a semi-finalist over both 100 metres and 200 metres at the US Olympic Team Trials. In February 2025, she placed fourth over 60 metres at the 2025 USA Indoor Track and Field Championships in New York, running 7.25 seconds in the final. She competed at the 2025 World Athletics Relays in China in the Mixed 4 × 100 metres relay in May 2025. In July, she ran a personal best for the 100 metres of 10.99 seconds at the Ed Murphey Classic. She placed third in her semi-final at the 2025 USA Outdoor Championships, running 11.23 seconds.

In February 2026, Mowatt won the 60 metres at the USATF NE Indoor Championship in a time of 7.40 seconds. She was a finalist over 60 metres at the 2025 American Indoor Championships, running times of 7.26 and 7.33 seconds. She was named in the United States team for the 2026 World Athletics Relays in Gaborone, Botswana. She was named to the mixed 4 x 100 metres relay alongside Courtney Lindsey, E'Lexis Hollis and Kyree King, winning their heat with a time of 40.36 seconds. In the final the following day, the quartet won the bronze medal behind Jamaica and Canada.

== Personal life ==
She is married to Pan American Games bronze medallist and former Jamaican 400 metres hurdles champion Kemar Mowatt, who has also worked as her coach.
