= 2026 World Athletics Indoor Championships – Women's 60 metres =

Women's 60 metres at the 2026 World Athletics Indoor Championships
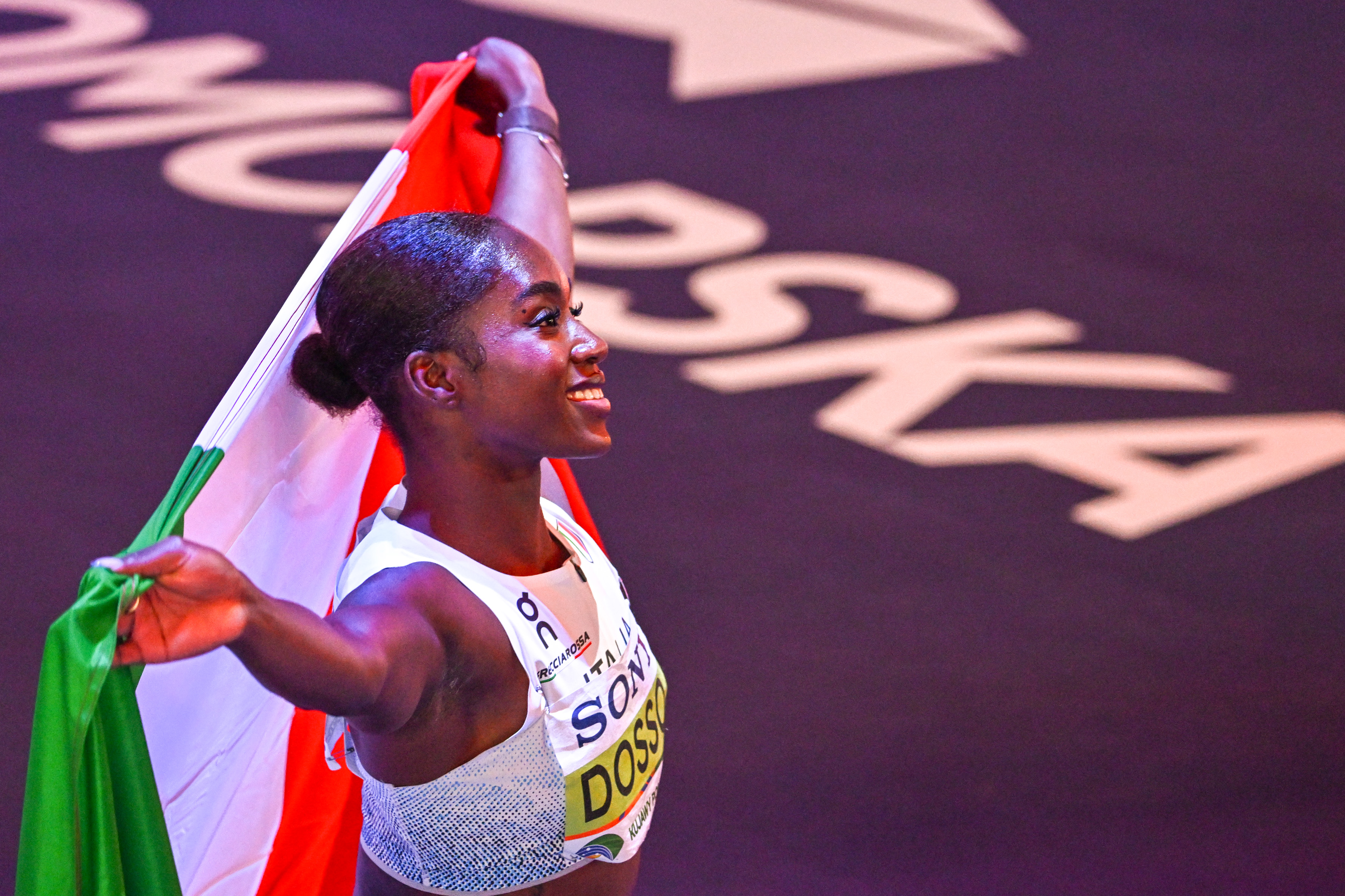
- Zaynab Dosso, three medals in a row at the World Indoor: 2024 bronze, 2025 silver, 2026 gold.
- Venue: Kujawsko-Pomorska Arena Toruń
- Location: Toruń, Poland
- Dates: 21 March
- Competitors: 52
- Winning time: 7.00

Medalists
gold medal	Zaynab Dosso	Italy
silver medal	Jacious Sears	United States
bronze medal	Julien Alfred	Saint Lucia

The women's 60 metres at the 2026 World Athletics Indoor Championships took place on the short track of the Kujawsko-Pomorska Arena Toruń in Toruń, Poland, on 21 March 2026. This was the 22nd time the event was contested at the World Athletics Indoor Championships. Athletes could qualify by achieving the entry standard or by their World Athletics Ranking in the event.

== Background ==
The women's 60 metres was contested 21 times before 2026, at every previous edition of the World Athletics Indoor Championships.

Records before the 2026 World Athletics Indoor Championships
Record	Athlete (nation)	Time (s)	Location	Date
World record	Irina Privalova (RUS)	6.92	Madrid, Spain	11 February 1993
World record	Irina Privalova (RUS)	6.92	Madrid, Spain	9 February 1995
Championship record	Gail Devers (USA)	6.95	Toronto, Canada	12 March 1993
2026 World Lead	Julien Alfred (LCA)	6.99	Fayetteville, United States	13 February 2026
2026 World Lead	Zaynab Dosso (ITA)	6.99	Toruń, Poland	22 February 2026

== Qualification ==
For the women's 60 metres, the qualification period ran from 1 November 2025 until 8 March 2026. Athletes could qualify by achieving the entry standard of 7.20 s. Athletes could also qualify by virtue of their World Athletics Ranking for the event or by virtue of their World Athletics Indoor Tour wildcard. There is a target number of 56 athletes.

== Results ==
=== Round 1 ===
Round 1 was held on 21 March, starting at 11:05 (UTC+1) in the morning.First 3 of each heat (Q) plus 3 fastest times (q) qualify to the semi-finals.

==== Heat 1 ====
Place	Lane	Athlete	Nation	Time	Notes
1	4	Zaynab Dosso	Italy	7.07 [.067]	Q
2	6	Audrey Leduc	Canada	7.20	Q, PB
3	8	Léonie Pointet	Switzerland	7.21 [.208]	Q
4	5	Jaslyn Gardner	United States	7.27 [.267]	
5	3	Magdalena Lindner	Austria	7.35	
6	7	Jessica Laurance	Philippines	7.37 [.363]	
7	2	Ema Bendová	Slovakia	7.51 [.506]	

==== Heat 2 ====
Place	Lane	Athlete	Nation	Time	Notes
1	3	Patrizia Van der Weken	Luxembourg	7.14	Q
2	5	Tatjana Pinto	Portugal	7.17 [.169]	Q, NR
3	8	Minke Bisschops	Netherlands	7.22 [.212]	Q
4	4	Lauren Roy	Ireland	7.25 [.246]	q
5	6	Ajla Del Ponte	Switzerland	7.25 [.247]	
6	2	Viktoria Korbová	Slovakia	6.81	
7	7	Zion Corrales-Nelson	Philippines	7.44	

==== Heat 3 ====
Place	Lane	Athlete	Nation	Time	Notes
1	7	Jonielle Smith	Jamaica	7.13	Q
2	6	Jaël Bestué	Spain	7.18 [.171]	Q, PB
3	8	Karolína Maňasová	Czech Republic	7.19 [.183]	Q
4	4	Zala Istenič	Slovenia	7.27 [.266]	
5	3	Rafaéla Spanoudaki-Hatziriga	Greece	7.36	
6	5	Alessandra Gasparelli	San Marino	7.51 [.509]	
7	2	Christina Alba Marcus Hafliðadóttir	Iceland	7.55	
	1	Saran Hadja Kouyaté	Guinea	DNS	

==== Heat 4 ====
Place	Lane	Athlete	Nation	Time	Notes
1	6	Julien Alfred	Saint Lucia	7.06 [.059]	Q
2	7	Sade McCreath	Canada	7.16 [.158]	Q
3	5	Kelly Doualla	Italy	7.27 [.266]	Q
4	8	Magdalena Stefanowicz	Poland	7.30 [.293]	
5	3	Gabriela Mourão	Brazil	7.31 [.305]	
6	2	Beatriz Castelhano	Portugal	7.37 [.369]	
7	4	María Montt	Chile	7.45 [.446]	

==== Heat 5 ====
Place	Lane	Athlete	Nation	Time	Notes
1	3	Dina Asher-Smith	Great Britain	7.07 [.070]	Q
2	6	Ana Azevedo	Brazil	7.17 [.168]	Q
3	2	Zoe Hobbs	New Zealand	7.21 [.202]	Q
4	8	Ciara Neville	Ireland	7.31 [.302]	
5	4	Gladymar Torres	Puerto Rico	7.33	
6	1	Liao Yanjun	Chinese Taipei	7.34	
7	5	Natacha Ngoye Akamabi	Republic of the Congo	7.46	SB
8	7	Lamiya Valiyeva	Azerbaijan	7.65	

==== Heat 6 ====
Place	Lane	Athlete	Nation	Time	Notes
1	8	Brianna Lyston	Jamaica	7.06 [.052]	Q, SB
2	6	Jacious Sears	United States	7.07 [.069]	Q
3	4	Lotta Kemppinen	Finland	7.16 [.160]	Q, NR
4	7	Philina Schwartz	Germany	7.18 [.172]	q
5	3	Claudine Njarasoa	Madagascar	7.30 [.297]	PB
6	2	Glanyernis Guerra	Venezuela	7.42 [.414]	
7	5	Loi Im Lan	Macau	7.45 [.449]	

==== Heat 7 ====
Place	Lane	Athlete	Nation	Time	Notes
1	5	Ewa Swoboda	Poland	7.08	Q
2	4	Amy Hunt	Great Britain	7.15	Q
3	2	Liranyi Alonso	Dominican Republic	7.19 [.188]	Q
4	7	Leah Bertrand	Trinidad and Tobago	7.22 [.214]	q
5	8	Isabel Posch	Austria	7.27 [.270]	
6	3	Lucija Potnik	Slovenia	7.42 [.412]	
7	1	Soniya Jones	Antigua and Barbuda	7.56	
8	6	Estelle Short	Cook Islands	7.93	PB

=== Semi-finals ===
The semi-finals were held on 21 March, starting at 20:14 (UTC+1) in the evening.

==== Heat 1 ====
Place	Lane	Athlete	Nation	Time	Notes
1	5	Julien Alfred	Saint Lucia	7.04 [.033]	Q
2	4	Jacious Sears	United States	7.04 [.040]	Q
3	6	Brianna Lyston	Jamaica	7.05 [.041]	q, SB
4	3	Amy Hunt	Great Britain	7.10	
5	2	Liranyi Alonso	Dominican Republic	7.19 [.183]	
6	7	Audrey Leduc	Canada	7.21	
7	1	Minke Bisschops	Netherlands	7.25 [.249]	
8	8	Kelly Doualla	Italy	7.36	

==== Heat 2 ====
Place	Lane	Athlete	Nation	Time	Notes
1	3	Zaynab Dosso	Italy	7.00	Q
2	5	Dina Asher-Smith	Great Britain	7.03 [.022]	Q, NR
3	2	Karolína Maňasová	Czech Republic	7.14	
4	4	Ana Azevedo	Brazil	7.15 [.144]	
5	6	Sade McCreath	Canada	7.15 [.145]	
6	7	Lotta Kemppinen	Finland	7.19 [.186]	
7	8	Philina Schwartz	Germany	7.20 [.191]	
8	1	Leah Bertrand	Trinidad and Tobago	7.25 [.242]	

==== Heat 3 ====
Place	Lane	Athlete	Nation	Time	Notes
1	4	Jonielle Smith	Jamaica	7.03 [.022]	Q, PB
2	5	Patrizia Van der Weken	Luxembourg	7.05 [.049]	Q
3	6	Ewa Swoboda	Poland	7.08	q
4	2	Zoe Hobbs	New Zealand	7.12	PB
5	3	Tatjana Pinto	Portugal	7.20 [.196]	
6	8	Lauren Roy	Ireland	7.23	
7	1	Léonie Pointet	Switzerland	7.27 [.264]	
8	7	Jaël Bestué	Spain	7.27 [.0.163]	

=== Final ===
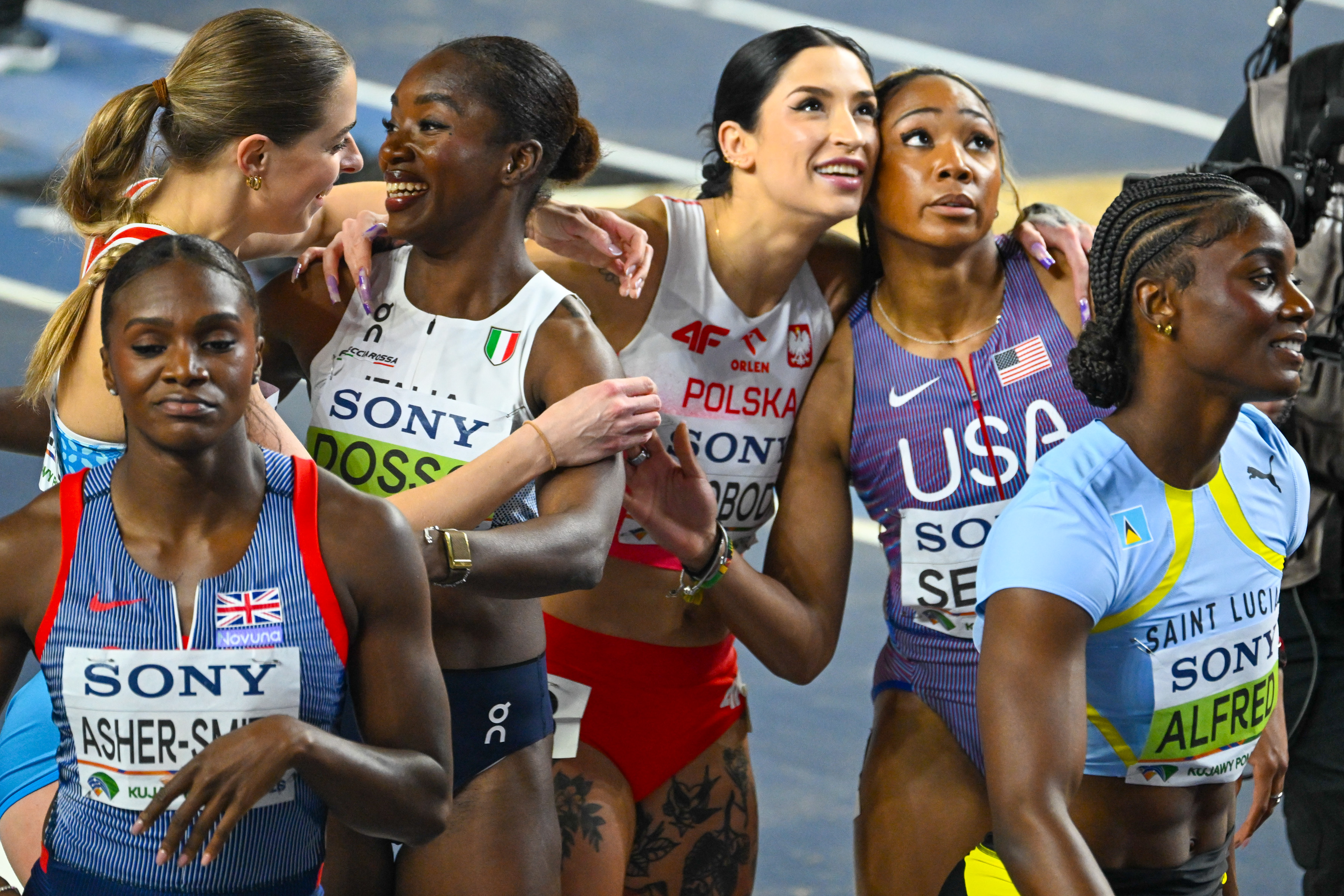
Six of the eight 60m finalists (only the two Jamaicans are missing from the photo).

The final was held on 21 March, starting at 21:20 (UTC+1) in the evening.

Place	Lane	Athlete	Nation	Time	Notes
1st place, gold medalist(s)	4	Zaynab Dosso	Italy	7.00	
2nd place, silver medalist(s)	2	Jacious Sears	United States	7.03 [.022]	SB
3rd place, bronze medalist(s)	5	Julien Alfred	Saint Lucia	7.03 [.025]	
4	1	Brianna Lyston	Jamaica	7.05	SB
5	6	Jonielle Smith	Jamaica	7.06	
6	8	Ewa Swoboda	Poland	7.07 [.069]	SB
7	3	Dina Asher-Smith	Great Britain	7.07 [.070]	
8	7	Patrizia Van der Weken	Luxembourg	7.10	
