= E'Lexis Hollis =

American sprinter (born 2002)

E’Lexis Hollis
Personal information
- Born: 3 July 2002 (age 23)

Sport
- Sport: Athletics
- Event: Sprint

Achievements and titles
- Personal best(s): 60m: 7.23 (2026); 100m: 11.25 (2025); 200m: 23.20 (2025)
Medal record
Women's athletics
Representing United States
World Relay Championships
Bronze medal – third place	2026 Gaborone	Mixed 4 × 100 m relay

E'Lexis Hollis (born 3 July 2002) is an American sprinter.

== Biography ==
Hollis studied at Ellensburg High School in Ellensburg, Washington, and competed for Central Washington University in the Great Northwest Athletic Conference (GNAC) setting school records over 60 metres, 100 metres and 200 metres.

After her final year at Central Washington University in 2025, she joined the Golden State Track Club in New Jersey, making her professional debut at the Spokane Showcase in February 2026. Hollis was a finalist over 60 metres at the 2026 USA Indoor Championships in Staten Island, running a personal best 7.26 seconds in the semi-final before improving with a time of 7.23 seconds to finish joint fifth overall alongside Alia Armstrong.

Named in the United States team for the 2026 World Athletics Relays in Gaborone, Botswana, she ran in the mixed 4 x 100 metres relay alongside Courtney Lindsey, Jada Mowatt and Kyree King, winning their heat with a time of 40.36 seconds. In the final the following day, the quartet won the bronze medal behind Jamaica and Canada.
