= Phaezel Selepe =

Botswana athlete (born 2006)

Personal information
- Full name: Prince Phaezel Selepe
- Born: 18 February 2006 (age 20)

Sport
- Sport: Athletics
- Event: Sprint
Medal record
Men's athletics
Representing Botswana
African Championships
Silver medal – second place	2026 Accra	200 m

Prince Phaezel Selepe (born 18 February 2006), also known as Phaezel Selepe, is a sprinter from Botswana. In 2026, he became national champion over 200 metres and won the silver medal over that distance at the 2026 African Championships in Athletics.

== Biography ==
In April 2026, Selepe became Botswanan national champion in the 200 metres, running 20.08 seconds in Gaborone. In May, he represented Botswana at the 2026 World Athletics Relays in Gaborone, helping the men's 4 x 100 metres relay qualify for the 2027 World Championships and set a new national record time of 37.96 seconds. Later that month, he competed for Botswana at the 2026 African Championships in Athletics, winning the silver medal behind Cheickna Traore of the Ivory Coast in the 200 metres final, running 20.42 seconds, having won his semi-final in 20.45 seconds. On 19 June, he ran a personal best 20.01 seconds to place fourth in the 200 metres at the 2026 Doha Diamond League. In July, he was a finalist in the 200 metres at the 2026 Commonwealth Games in Glasgow, Scotland.
