= Joe Ferguson (sprinter) =

British sprinter (born 2000)

Personal information
- Nationality: British (English)
- Born: 3 May 2000 (age 26) Barnsley, England

Sport
- Sport: Track and Field
- Event: 200 metres
- Club: Leeds AC
Medal record
Men's athletics
Representing Great Britain
World Relays
Bronze medal – third place	2025 Guangzhou	mixed 4×100 m relay

Joe Ferguson (born 3 May 2000) is a British sprinter from Yorkshire. In 2025 he became British champion over 200 metres indoors.

== Biography ==
Ferguson started running in Yorkshire for Barnsley AC in 2013, before running for Leeds City.

At the British Athletics Championships in September 2020, held in Manchester, Ferguson won bronze in the 200 metres. At the 2022 World Championship trials Ferguson ran a personal best time of 20.23 to qualify for the 2022 World Athletics Championships. At the games themselves, running in the 200 metres, Ferguson qualified from the heats to make the semi-finals.

In November 2024, he was named by British Athletics on the Olympic Futures Programme for 2025. He ran an indoors personal best of 20.93 seconds to win the 200 metres title at the 2025 British Indoor Athletics Championships in Birmingham, on 23 February 2025. He was named in the British team for the 2025 World Athletics Relays in Guangzhou. He ran in the mixed 4 x 100 metres relay, alongside Nia Wedderburn-Goodison, Kissiwaa Mensah and Jeriel Quainoo as the British quartet finished second in their heat to qualify for the final. In the final, they won the bronze medal in the event. He was selected for the 4 x 100 metres relay at the 2025 European Athletics Team Championships in Madrid in June 2025. In October 2025, he was retained on the British Athletics Olympic Futures Programme for 2025/26.
