= Gabrielle Cole =

Canadian athlete (born 2004)

Personal information
- Nationality: Canadian
- Born: 30 November 2004 (age 21)

Sport
- Sport: Athletics
- Event: Sprint

Achievements and titles
- Personal bests: 60m: 7.20 (2026); 100m: 11.38 (2025); 200m: 23.47 (2025)
Medal record
Women's athletics
Representing Canada
World Relays
Gold medal – first place	2025 Guangzhou	Mixed 4×100 m relay

Gabrielle Cole (born 30 November 2004) is a Canadian sprinter.

== Biography ==
From Ajax, Ontario, Cole attended J. Clarke Richardson Collegiate and trained as a member of the Flying Angels Track and Field Academy. She showed promise in sprinting at an early age. In 2019, she won three titles at the Canadian U16 Indoor Championship in Montreal at the age of 14 years-old, with her performances including setting a new meeting record over 60 metres.

Cole studies at the University of Guelph. In February 2025, she set a personal best of 7.36 in the 60 m to lead in the U Sports rankings, and set a 200 metres outright personal best of 23.86 seconds. She was selected that year for the Canadian relay pool to compete at the 2025 World Athletics Relays in Guangzhou, China in May 2025, and ran in the heats of the mixed 4 x 100 metres relay, helping the Canada team win the gold medal. In August, Cole won the 100 metres title at the 2025 Canada Games with a time of 11.70 seconds.

In 2026, she lowered her 60 m personal best to 7.20 seconds at the 2026 U Sports Indoor Track & Field Championships in Winnipeg to move to second on the Canadian all-time U23 list, just one-hundredth of a second behind the U23 and U Sports record of 7.19, set by Khamica Bingham in 2015. She also won the silver medal in the 300m the following day behind her teammate Dianna Proctor, before winning the women's 4x400m relay and placing second in the 4x200m relay alongside Proctor. She was selected later that year as part of the Canadian team for the 2026 World Athletics Relays.

Cole competed in the 100 metres at the 2026 Commonwealth Games in Glasgow, Scotland, reaching the semi-finals.
