= Oliwer Wdowik =

Polish athlete (born 2002)

Oliver Wdowik
Personal information
- Full name: Oliwer Mateusz Wdowik
- Nationality: Polish
- Born: 3 January 2002 (age 24)
- Education: University of Rzeszów

Sport
- Sport: Athletics
- Event: Sprint

Achievements and titles
- Personal bests: 60m: 6.54 (2026); 100m: 10.10 (2025); 200m: 20.82 (2020)
Medal record
Men's athletics
Representing Poland
World U20 Championships
Bronze medal – third place	2021 Nairobi	4×100m relay

Oliwer Wdowik (born 3 January 2002) is a Polish sprinter. He has won national indoors titles over 60 metres and 200 metres. He competed over 100 metres at the 2024 Paris Olympics.

== Biography ==
He is from Rzeszów, Poland and is a member of Resovia sports club. In February 2020, he won the Polish indoors national 200 metres title.

He finished fifth in the individual 100 metres and won bronze as part of the Polish 4x100m relay team at the 2021 World Athletics U20 Championships in Nairobi, Kenya in a European U20 record time, alongside Dominik Łuczynski, Patryk Krupa and Jakub Pietrusa.

In February 2024, he won the Polish national title over 60 metres in Toruń, Poland. He ran as part of the Polish 4x100m relay team at the 2024 World Relays Championships in Nassau, Bahamas.

In June 2024, he participated in the 2024 European Athletics Championships in Rome, Italy. Later that month, he was runner-up in the 100 metres at the Polish Athletics Championships in Bydgoszcz. He competed in the 100 metres at the 2024 Paris Olympics but did not advance past the qualifying heats.

He suffered injury in the winter of 2025 and did not compete prior to the Polish Indoor Championships in February 2025. Despite this, he won the 60 metres title at the Polish Championships in Toruń, in a time of 6.68 seconds. He competed in the 60 metres at the 2025 European Athletics Indoor Championships in Apeldoorn, Netherlands, where he qualified for the semi-finals. In the semi-final he ran a seasons best 6.62 seconds to place fifth and did not proceed to the final.

He competed at the 2025 World Athletics Relays in China in the Men's 4 × 100 metres relay in May 2025, helping Poland qualify for the final and gain an assured place at the upcoming World Championships. He ran a new personal best of 10.10 seconds in the 100 metres at the 2025 European Athletics Team Championships in Madrid. In September 2025, he competed in the men's 4 x 100 metres at the 2025 World Championships in Tokyo, Japan.

In January 2026, he lowered his personal best for the 60 metres to 6.59 seconds at the Orlen Cup Lodz in Poland. He lowered it again the following month at the Sparkassen Indoor Meeting Dortmund, a World Athletics Indoor Tour Bronze meeting, running 6.55 seconds. Wdowik won the men’s 60m title at the 2026 Polish Indoor Championships, running a new best of 6.54 seconds. He was a semi-finalist in the 60 metres at the 2026 World Athletics Indoor Championships in Toruń, Poland.
