= Duan Asemota =

Canadian sprinter (born 1996)

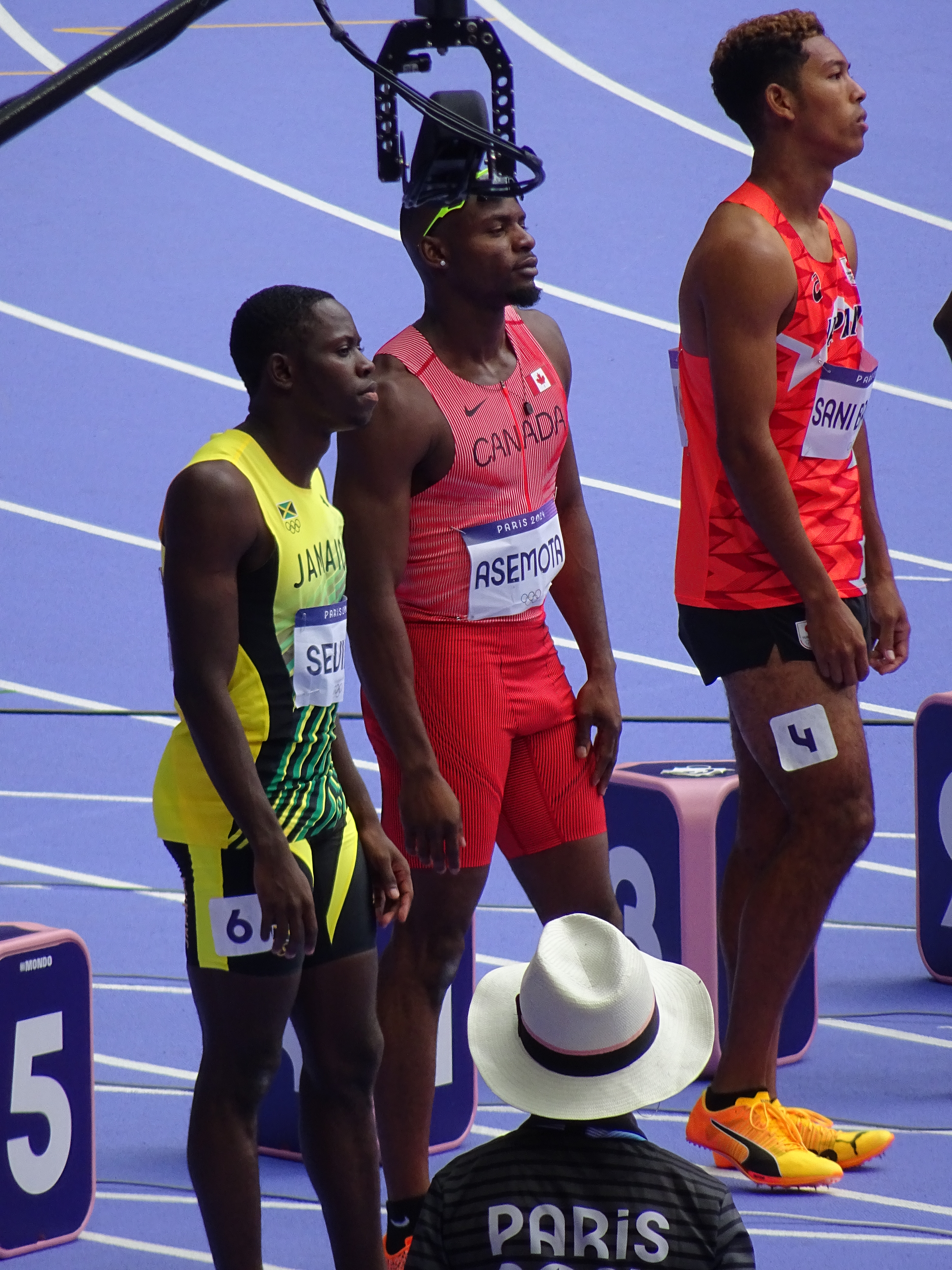
- Asemota (center) at the 2024 Summer Olympics

Personal information
- Born: 29 August 1996 (age 29) Montreal, Quebec, Canada

Sport
- Sport: Athletics
- Events: 100 metres, 200 metres, 60 metres
- University team: Ohio State University
- Club: Speed Academy Athletics Club / Speed with Attitude
- Coached by: Charles Allen

Achievements and titles
- Personal bests: 100 m: 10.03 s (London, ON 2024); 60 m (indoor): 6.70 s (Toronto 2025); 200 m: 20.95 s (Windsor, ON 2017)
Medal record
Men's athletics
Representing Canada
World Relay Championships
Gold medal – first place	2025 Guangzhou	4 × 100 m relay
Silver medal – second place	2026 Gaborone	Mixed 4 × 100 m relay
Commonwealth Games
Silver medal – second place	2026 Glasgow	4 × 100 m relay

Duan Asemota (born 29 August 1996) is a Canadian sprinter specializing in the 100 metres. He represented Canada at the 2024 Summer Olympics in Paris, competing in both the 100 metres and the 4 × 100 metres relay. Asemota is a multiple-time national team member and a former NCAA All-American.

== Early life and education ==
Asemota was born in Montreal, Quebec, and raised in Ajax, Ontario. He is of Nigerian descent. He began track and field at the age of eight but focused on sprinting during high school at Notre Dame Catholic Secondary School. Asemota was a multi-sport athlete, also playing basketball for the Durham City Bulldogs and soccer for Pickering Soccer Club. In 2014, he broke his high school's senior records in both the 100 metres and 200 metres.

After high school, Asemota attended Coffeyville Community College in Kansas, earning an associate degree before transferring to Ohio State University, where he majored in communication studies and competed in NCAA Division I track and field.

== Collegiate career ==
At Ohio State, Asemota became a First-Team All-American, contributing to the 4×100 metre relay team's school record and second-place finish at the 2018 NCAA Championships. He also earned silver in the 100 metres at the 2018 Big Ten Championships and helped the relay team win the Big Ten title that year.

== International career ==
Asemota made his international debut at the 2015 Pan American Junior Athletics Championships in Edmonton, Alberta. In 2016, he competed at the NACAC U23 Championships in San Salvador, running 10.87 seconds in the 100 metres preliminaries and helping Canada's 4×100 metre relay team to a fifth-place finish in 40.55 seconds.

In 2019, Asemota finished fifth in the 100 metres at the 2019 Summer Universiade in Naples.

In 2023, he placed fifth in the 100 metres at the Canadian Track and Field Championships, earning a spot on Canada's 4×100 metre relay team for the 2023 World Athletics Championships in Budapest.

== 2024 Summer Olympics ==
At the 2024 Summer Olympics in Paris, Asemota competed in the men's 100 metres, finishing fifth in his heat with a time of 10.17 seconds, narrowly missing advancement to the semifinals. He also participated in the 4×100 metre relay. Asemota later revealed he had been managing a torn labrum and sports hernia during the Games.

== 2025 Canadian Indoor Championships ==
In March 2025, Asemota won the men's 60 metres at the Canadian Indoor Championships in Toronto with a time of 6.70 seconds. He also anchored his club, Speed with Attitude, to gold in the 4×200 metre relay in 1:30.51, setting a new championship record.

== Coaching ==
Asemota is coached by Charles Allen, a former Canadian Olympian and current Hub Coach for Sprints and Hurdles (East) with Athletics Canada.

== Career highlights ==
Year	Competition	Event	Result	Notes
2015	Pan American Junior Championships	100 m	—	DQ (false start)
2016	NACAC U23 Championships	100 m	10.87	Prelims only
2016	NACAC U23 Championships	4 × 100 m relay5th	10.19 seconds	
2018	Big Ten Championships	100 m	2nd	Silver medalist
2018	Big Ten Championships	4 × 100 m relay	1st	Gold medalist, Conference record
2018	NCAA Championships	4 × 100 m relay	2nd	NCAA All-American
2019	2019 Summer Universiade	100 m	5th	Finalist
2023	Canadian Track and Field Championships	100 m	5th	Named to World Championships team
2023	2023 World Athletics Championships	4 × 100 m relay	—	Represented Canada
2024	2024 Summer Olympics	100 m	5th in heat	10.17 seconds
2024	2024 Summer Olympics	4 × 100 m relay	—	Competed
2025	Canadian Indoor Championships	60 m	1st	National Champion (6.70)
2025	Canadian Indoor Championships	4 × 200 m relay	1st	Gold medal, Championship record

== Personal bests ==
Event	Time	Wind	Venue	Date
100 metres	10.03 s	+1.9 m/s	London, Ontario	26 May 2024
100 metres (wind-assisted)	9.98 s	+3.4 m/s	Baton Rouge, Louisiana	20 April 2024
200 metres	20.95 s	+0.9 m/s	Windsor, Ontario	18 June 2017
60 metres (indoor)	6.70 s	N/A	Toronto, Ontario	22 March 2025
4×200 metres relay (indoor)	1:30.51	N/A	Toronto, Ontario	22 March 2025

== See also ==
- List of Canadian sports personalities
- Athletics in Canada
