= 2025 World Athletics Relays – Mixed 4 × 100 metres relay =

Mixed 4 × 100 metres relay at the 2025 World Athletics Relays
- Venue: Tianhe Stadium, Guangzhou
- Dates: 10 May (heats); 11 May (final)
- Winning time: 40.30

Medalists
| gold medal | Sade McCreath; Marie-Éloïse Leclair; Duan Asemota; Eliezer Adjibi; Gabrielle Cole*; Jacqueline Madogo* | Canada |
| silver medal | Serena Cole; Krystal Sloley; Javari Thomas; Bryan Levell; Natasha Morrison*; Rasheed Foster* | Jamaica |
| bronze medal | Asha Philip; Kissiwaa Mensah; Jeriel Quainoo; Joe Ferguson; Nia Wedderburn-Goodison* | Great Britain |

The mixed 4 × 100 metres relay at the 2025 World Athletics Relays was held at the Tianhe Stadium in Guangzhou, China on 10 and 11 May.

It was the first time a mixed 4 × 100 metres was held at the World Athletics Relays.

== Records ==
No records were established prior to the championships.

| Record | Team | Time | Location | Date |
|---|---|---|---|---|
| World record | Vacant | — | | |
| Championships record | Vacant | — | | |
| 2025 World Leading | Vacant | — | | |

== Qualification ==
On 10 November 2024, World Athletics announced the qualification system for the championships. The top 16 teams in each event at the 2024 Summer Olympic Games qualify for entry to the championships. The host country China will enter with one team in each event, regardless of any entry conditions. The remaining teams (up to 32 in total per event) will be determined through the top lists in the qualification period (1 January 2024 to 13 April 2025).

== Program ==
All times are local (UTC+8).

| Date | Time | Round |
|---|---|---|
| 10 May 2025 | 19:01 | Heats |
| 11 May 2025 | 19:05 | Final |

== Results ==
=== Heats ===
The heats were held on 10 May 2025, starting at 19:01 (UTC+8) in the evening. Qualification: First 2 of each heat (Q) plus 2 fastest times (q) qualify to the Final.

==== Heat 1 ====
| Rank | Lane | Nation | Competitors | Time | Notes |
|---|---|---|---|---|---|
| 1 | 8 | Italy | Alice Pagliarini, Gaya Bertello, Andrea Federici, Samuele Ceccarelli | 41.15 | Q |
| 2 | 7 | France | Lucie Jean-Charles, Noemie Denon, Dylan Vermont, Antoine Thoraval | 41.28 | Q |
| 3 | 6 | Switzerland | Lena Weiss, Soraya Becerra, Mathieu Chèvre, Jonathan Gou Gomez | 41.92 | |
| 4 | 5 | United States | Kennedy Blackmon, Jada Mowatt, Kendal Williams, Pjai Austin | 1:05.77 | |
| | 4 | Poland | Karolina Łozowska, Monika Romaszko, Adrian Brzeziński, Marek Zakrzewski | DNF | |

==== Heat 2 ====
| Rank | Lane | Nation | Competitors | Time | Notes |
|---|---|---|---|---|---|
| 1 | 6 | Jamaica | Natasha Morrison, Krystal Sloley, Javari Thomas, Rasheed Foster | 41.04 | Q |
| 2 | 7 | Great Britain | Nia Wedderburn-Goodison, Kissiwaa Mensah, Jeriel Quainoo, Joe Ferguson | 41.05 | Q |
| 3 | 8 | China | Shuping Huang, Lingyao Kong, Jinfeng Chen, Guanfeng Chen | 41.30 | q |
| 4 | 5 | Germany | Sina Mayer, Sina Kammerschmitt, Aleksandar Ašković, Chidiera Onuoha | 41.43 | |
| | 4 | Spain | Esperança Cladera, Jaël Bestué, Adria Alfonso, Ricardo Sánchez | DNF | |

==== Heat 3 ====
| Rank | Lane | Nation | Competitors | Time | Notes |
|---|---|---|---|---|---|
| 1 | 6 | Canada | Gabrielle Cole, Jacqueline Madogo, Duan Asemota, Eliezer Adjibi | 40.90 | Q |
| 2 | 8 | Australia | Olivia Dodds, Carla Bull, Connor Bond, Josiah John | 41.15 | Q |
| 3 | 5 | Belgium | Janie De Naeyer, Lotte Van Lent, Robbe Torfs, Rendel Vermeulen | 41.24 | q |
| 4 | 7 | Netherlands | Demi van den Wildenberg, Fenna Achterberg, Timo Spiering, Eugene Omalla | 41.81 | |
| | 4 | Nigeria | | DNS | |

=== Final ===
The final was held on 11 May 2025, starting at 19:05 (UTC+8) in the evening.

| Rank | Lane | Nation | Competitors | Time | Notes |
|---|---|---|---|---|---|
| 1st place, gold medalist(s) | 6 | Canada | Sade McCreath, Marie-Éloïse Leclair, Duan Asemota, Eliezer Adjibi | 40.30 | SB |
| 2nd place, silver medalist(s) | 7 | Jamaica | Serena Cole, Krystal Sloley, Javari Thomas, Bryan Levell | 40.44 | SB |
| 3rd place, bronze medalist(s) | 8 | Great Britain | Asha Philip, Kissiwaa Mensah, Jeriel Quainoo, Joe Ferguson | 40.88 | SB |
| 4 | 9 | Australia | Olivia Dodds, Carla Bull, Connor Bond, Josiah John | 41.22 | |
| 5 | 5 | Italy | Chiara Melon, Gaya Bertello, Roberto Rigali, Stephen Baffour | 41.25 | |
| 6 | 4 | France | Lucie Jean-Charles, Noemie Denon, Dylan Vermont, Antoine Thoraval | 41.31 | |
| 7 | 3 | China | Shuping Huang, Lingyao Kong, Jinfeng Chen, Guanfeng Chen | 41.56 | |
| 8 | 2 | Belgium | Janie De Naeyer, Lotte Van Lent, Robbe Torfs, Rendel Vermeulen | 41.72 | |
