= Sade McCreath =

Canadian athlete

Personal information
- Nationality: Canadian
- Born: 25 June 1996 (age 30)
- Home town: Ajax, Ontario

Sport
- Sport: Athletics
- Event: Sprint

Achievements and titles
- Personal bests: 60m: 7.12 (2026); 100m: 10.86 (2026) NR; 200m: 23.19 (2023)
Medal record
Women's athletics
Representing Canada
Commonwealth Games
Silver medal – second place	2026 Glasgow	4×100m relay
World Relay Championships
Gold medal – first place	2025 Guangzhou	Mixed 4 × 100 m relay
Silver medal – second place	2026 Gaborone	4×100 m relay
Pan American Championships
Gold medal – first place	2026 Medellín	100 m

Sade McCreath (born 25 June 1996) is a Canadian sprinter. She competed at the 2024 Summer Olympics. In 2026, she set a new Canadian national record for the 100 metres and won the 100 metres at the inaugural Pan American Championships.

== Biography ==
McCreath competed over 60 metres at the 2024 World Athletics Indoor Championships in Glasgow, Scotland. She was part of the Canadian 4 × 100 m relay team that competed at the 2024 World Athletics Relays in Nassau, Bahamas, and qualified for the 2024 Olympic Games. She was selected to compete for Canada at the 2024 Summer Olympics in Paris for her Olympic debut. She was part of the 4 × 100 m sprint relay team which qualified for the final, setting a national record of 45.20 seconds.

McCreath reached the semi-finals of the 60 metres at the 2025 World Athletics Indoor Championships in Nanjing. She was selected for the Canadian relay pool for the 2025 World Athletics Relays in Guangzhou, China in May 2025, where she won the gold medal in the inaugural Mixed 4 x 100 metres relay. The following weekend, she ran the 100 metres at the Golden Grand Prix in Tokyo in 11.46 seconds to finish behind Bree Rizzo and Twanisha Terry in third but ahead of Sha'Carri Richardson.

On 22 June 2025, she equalled the Canadian national record of Audrey Leduc with a time of 10.95s (+1.2 m/s) to win the women's 100m at the Bob Vigars Classic in Ontario. It was also the fastest time for the distance ever recorded by a woman on Canadian soil. Earlier in the evening, she had also ran a wind-assisted time of 10.94 seconds in the preliminary round at the event.

McCreath was a finalist in the 100 metres at the 2025 NACAC Championships in Freeport, The Bahamas placing fifth overall in 11.19 seconds (+0.1). In September 2025, she competed in the 100 metres at the 2025 World Championships in Tokyo, Japan. She also ran in the women's 4 x 100 metres relay at the championships as the Canadian team placed seventh overall.

McCreath won the 60 metres title at the 2026 Canadian Indoor Championships, running a time of 7.12 seconds to move to joint-second on the Canadian all-time list behind Philomena Mensah. She also ran 7.12 seconds to win the ISTAF Indoor Berlin 60 metres race on 6 March 2026. She was selected as part of the Canada team for the 2026 World Athletics Relays in Gaborone, Botswana. She ran in the women's 4 x 100 metres as Canada won the silver medal behind Jamaica, running a national record time 42.17 seconds. Selected as part of the Canadian team for the inaugural 2026 Pan American Championships in Athletics in Medellín, she won the 100 metres final, running 11.10 seconds to win ahead of Brazilian Ana Carolina Azevedo. In July, she set a new Canadian national record with 10.86 seconds (+1.7) at the 2026 Edmonton Athletics Invitational. She was named in the Canada team for the 2026 Commonwealth Games, winning the silver medal in the women's 4 × 100 m relay. She was alao a finalist competing in the women's 100 metres in Glasgow, Scotland. In September, she competed over 100 m at the inaugural World Ultimate Championship in Budapest.

== Personal life ==
She is from Ajax, Ontario. She is of Jamaican descent through both her parents. She attended high school at St. Edmund Campion Secondary School where she holds the record for 100m and 200m. She attended Bethune-Cookman University.

== Athletics achievements ==
Information from her World Athletics profile unless otherwise noted.

=== Personal bests ===
Type	Distance	Time (s)	Wind (m/s)	Venue	Date	Notes
Individual events
Indoor	60 metres	7.12	—N/a	Toronto, Canada	28 February 2026	
Indoor	60 metres	7.12	—N/a	Berlin, Germany	6 March 2026	
Indoor	200 metres sh	24.76	—N/a	Atlanta, United States	8 February 2018	
Outdoor	100 metres	10.86	+1.7	Edmonton, Canada	12 July 2026	NR
Outdoor	200 metres	23.19	+1.6	Langley, Canada	30 July 2023	
Team events
Outdoor	4 × 100 metres relay	42.17	—N/a	Gaborone, Botswana	3 May 2026	NR
Outdoor	Mixed 4 × 100 metres relay	40.30	—N/a	Guangzhou, China	11 May 2025	

=== International competitions ===
Representing Canada
Year	Competition	Venue	Position	Event	Time	Notes
2014	World Junior Championships	Eugene, United States	24th (sf)	100 m	12.16	
2014	World Junior Championships	Eugene, United States	—	4 × 100 m relay	DNF	
2019	Summer Universiade	Naples, Italy	12th (sf)	100 m	11.65	
2024	World Indoor Championships	Glasgow, United Kingdom	32nd (h)	60 m	7.30	
2024	World Relays	Nassau, The Bahamas	7th	4 × 100 m relay	43.09	
2024	Olympic Games	Paris, France	6th	4 × 100 m relay	42.69	
2025	World Indoor Championships	Nanjing, China	21st (sf)	60 m	7.35	
2025	World Relays	Guangzhou, China	5th	4 × 100 m relay	42.46	NR
2025	World Relays	Guangzhou, China	1st	Mixed 4 × 100 m relay	40.30	SB
2025	NACAC Championships	Freeport, The Bahamas	5th	100 m	11.19	
2025	World Championships	Tokyo, Japan	36th (h)	100 m	11.41	
2025	World Championships	Tokyo, Japan	7th	4 × 100 m relay	42.82	
2026	World Indoor Championships	Toruń, Poland	13th (sf)	60 m	7.15	
2026	World Relays	Gaborone, Botswana	2nd	4 × 100 m relay	42.17	NR
2026	Pan American Championships	Medellín, Colombia	1st	100 m	11.10	
2026	Commonwealth Games	Glasgow, United Kingdom	7th	100 m	11.14	
2026	Commonwealth Games	Glasgow, United Kingdom	2nd	4 × 100 m relay	42.76	
2026	World Ultimate Championships	Budapest, Hungary	17th (sf)	100 m	11.39	
2026	World Ultimate Championships	Budapest, Hungary	4th	Mixed 4 × 100 m relay	40.34	
