= Philina Schwartz =

German sprinter (born 2006)

Philina Marianne Schwartz
Personal information
- Born: 25 November 2006 (age 19)

Sport
- Sport: Athletics
- Event: Sprint

Achievements and titles
- Personal best(s): 60m: 7.16 (2026); 100m: 11.24 (2025); 200m: 23.75 (2025)

Philina Marianne Schwartz (born 25 November 2006) is a German sprinter. She won the 60 metres title at the German Indoor Athletics Championships in 2026.

== Biography ==
Born in Oberhausen and later based Berlin, in 2025 Schwartz set personal best times of 7.36 seconds for the 60 metres and 11.24 seconds outdoors in the 100 meters. Since 2023, she has worked with sprint coach Max Schnicke. She is a member of Berlin Athletics Club. Schwartz set a personal best in the 100 metres to claim a victory at the 2025 German U20 Championships in 11.37 seconds. She was subsequently a finalist in the 100 metres at the 2025 European Athletics U20 Championships in Tampere, Finland.

Schwartz opened her 2026 indoor season at the Gerhard Schlegel Memorial Sports Festival in Berlin with two new personal bests in the 60 meters, running 7.30 seconds in the heat before improving to a time of 7.22 seconds in the final. The following month, she lowered her personal best again, and met the automatic qualifying standard for the 2026 World Indoor Championships, with a run of 7.18 seconds at the North German Indoor Championships in Neubrandenburg. On 13 February 2026, Schwartz had a victory in the 60m at the Erfurt Indoor 2026, a World Athletics Indoor Tour Challenger meeting, extending her unbeaten streak to nine races in 2026. She qualified fastest for the final with 7.21 seconds before setting a new lifetime best of 7.17 seconds, to move to an early lead at the top of the German 2026 list. On 28 February, she lowered her personal best for the 60 metres to 7.16 seconds qualifying for the final at the German Indoor Athletics Championships, winning the final with a time of 7.18 seconds ahead of Sina Kammerschmitt and Jolina Ernst.

Schwartz made her major championship debut at the 2026 World Athletics Indoor Championships in Poland, where she was the youngest member of the German team. She reached the semi-finals of the 60 metres, running her third and sixth fastest times of her career with 7.18 seconds in her heat and 7.20 in her semi-final.
