= George Eid =

Lebanese journalist (born 1985)

- Τζορτζ Ιντ
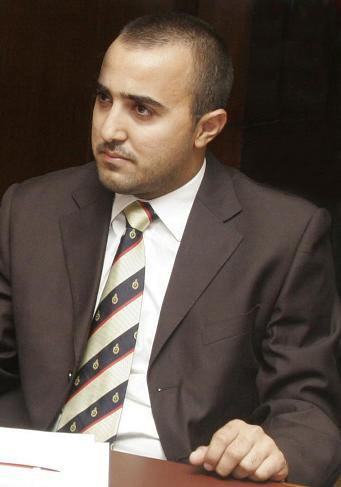
- Born: George Eid; June 25, 1985 (age 40); Ashrafieh, Beirut, Lebanon
- Occupations: Head of News Operations, Deputy Editor in Chief, News reporter, Anchor, University Lecturer
- Years active: 2007–present
- Spouse: Rana Richa
- Children: Eleni Eid
- Parent(s): Elias Eid; Caroline Mazidji
- Awards: Said Akl Award 2007

George Eid (Arabic: جورج عيد) (Greek: τζορτζ Ιντ) (born June 25, 1985) is a multilingual Lebanese senior journalist, anchor, war correspondent, documentary producer and university lecturer, columnist known for his liberal reports and articles. He is among the young journalists who appeared in Lebanon after 2007.

At a young age he made his debut on radio and television, and in e-media and written media in a period of seven years. He was a founding member of Murr Television, Lebanon and Sky News Arabia. He was one of the first international correspondents to enter Aleppo to cover the Syrian conflict in 2012. He is also the producer of the first documentary about the Greeks of Lebanon Kalimera Men Beirut, which was first shown in March 2017.

== Early life and education ==
Eid was born in Beirut, Lebanon, the son of Elias Eid and Caroline Mazidji. During his early childhood he was raised by his maternal grandparents both refugees from Asia Minor. He spent most of his childhood with them in the Gemmayzeh and Mar Mikhaël neighbourhoods during a time when Lebanon was divided by civil war. They had a great influence on him and both were later featured in a documentary he made about the Greeks of Lebanon. Eid developed a great passion for languages at an early age.

He was educated at the German school of Jounieh and learned to speak five languages: Arabic, German, French, English and Greek. After graduating he attended the Lebanese American University in 2004 and enrolled for a bachelor's degree in journalism. He later transferred to Notre Dame University in 2005 where he completed a BA in journalism and public relations.

In 2012 he was accepted into the master's program at Paris-Sorbonne University (Paris IV) - CELSA Paris, graduating two years later with a master's degree in marketing, management, communication and media. From an early age he had a passion for news and wanted to work in the media industry.

== Career ==
Eid received the Said Akl Award in 2007 for best poetic performance. He was also awarded the first prize from an international library of poets for his poem "Life". His reports and columns appeared in many Lebanese newspapers, particularly in An-Nahar and Al Aamal between 2007–2009. In 2007 after the July war, Eid participated in the United Nations Development Program (UNDP) conference in Malta and helped to issue the overall report on oil spill pollution in Lebanon affecting the shoreline from Jieh to Byblos. He also served as a youth shadow Minister of Tourism and Industry between in 2007–2008.

The second Youth Shadow government was established after a bill was passed on December 12, 2005, by the Lebanese cabinet to establish and support such a structure. This was developed by MP and Editor in Chief of An-Nahar daily, Gebran Tueni who was assassinated during the Cedar Revolution.

Eid was also the editor-in-chief of the weekly magazine Al Raii el Aam (public opinion). He also occupied the seat of political editor at the web news agency iloubnan.info in 2008. He was also a freelance writer with articles published in publications such as Timeout-Beirut, Naharashabab, Elite, El taswik el Arabi-Dubai, and Haya-Dubai.

At the end of 2008, Lebanese Radio CEO Fouad Hamdan asked Eid to present a talk show on Radio Lebanon tackling the Lebanese elections in June 2009. Eid proposed the program name Saadat Al Nakheb, which was approved and began airing on January 9, 2009. The show voiced the opinions of young people and independent politicians. In a review in Annahar saadat al Nakheb the program was described as an "innovative new show that is timely and needed". The show aired until the end of June 2009. He then started the program Lana wa Lakum which tackled the daily issues of Lebanese society; it ended by September 2009. On April 7, 2009, Eid began his television career with the newly reborn Murr television. He became a reporter known for his innovative style of reporting on a wide range of issues from social to political.

On October 7, 2010, an MTV correspondent received threats related to his reporting on the mysterious purchase of lands by Hezbollah in the eastern part of the Lebanese capital Beirut. A step which has been considered to have caused a demographic imbalance in the region. However, despite these threats, Eid prepared and aired a follow -up report on the same issue on October 23, 2010, and another on November 26, 2010.

Eid joined Voice of Lebanon (VDL 100.5FM) radio station as a news anchor and show host on January 15, 2011. On February 7 he aired the political show Al-mahkama which tackled all issues related to the Special Tribunal of Lebanon. February 17, Eid took a phone call on air from a witness to P.M. Hariri's assassination, Zuhair el Sedik, who launched a series of accusations during the show. Following this Eid received a court summons issued by ex-minister Karim Pakradouni who was accused by el Sedik. However the case was dropped on 25 February 25, 2011. On April 22, 2011, Eid was shot at while reporting on outlaws in the western part of Beirut where Hezbollah militants dominate. However, Eid was not hurt or injured due to the protection of the Lebanese security forces, and he was able to produce and publish the report on the same day. On 30 November 2011, Eid resigned from MTV after signing with SKY NEWS Arabia, based in Abu Dhabi. He assumed the position of deputy news Editor and Roving reporter.

In 2014 Eid returned to MTV as a deputy editor-in-chief and senior reporter.

Eid was appointed as Head of News Operations for MTV Lebanon News in July 2019. He led a newsroom of 90 journalists through the October 2019 uprising in Lebanon, Corona pandemic and a dire economic situation.

He kept his role as a Senior correspondent for the channel whereas he was the first to arrive on the field on the afternoon of the Beirut port blast on 4 August 2020.

In parallel, he started to report for Voice of America Radio in Washington DC in English after the Beirut Blast. In addition to reporting for ANT1 Greece in Greek.

On August 30, 2020 he joined the 75-year-old Cyprus Mail newspaper as its Middle East correspondent, based in Beirut.

== Affiliation with Greece ==
Having Greek roots from his maternal side. Eid has always supported the Greek Community of Beirut. In 2016, He produced the documentary Kalimera men Beirut, the first of its kind to tell the story of the Greeks who came to Lebanon as Refugees in 1922. In February 2019 he founded the organization Stin Viryto with the main purpose of promoting and preserving the Greek culture in Lebanon. In June that same year, he launched the first Greek Festival of Lebanon an event that was attended by more than 12000 people over three days and acclaimed by both the Lebanese and Greek Media.

On August 15, 2020 George Eid Started shooting his new documentary "Zeibekiko of Beirut" that tells the story of the Greek community in Beirut after the Beirut Port blast.

== A selection of articles and editorials ==
- عميدالحبر والدم
- عذرا منك شارل شيخاني
- نشيد الصحافي
- الله اليوم في موسم الحصاد
- 6 points balancing a handshake and a bullet
- Downtown Beirut sit-in to a sudden end
- The General who knew too little or too much?
- A government or not a government?
- A government...Pending yesterday!
- On the threshold of a new presidential era?

== Media and interviews ==
- ورشة عمل شبابية في صور عن تنشيط وتنمية سياحية افضل
- الوزير ماروني التقى وزير السياحة في "حكومة الظل
- عيد أطلع ديبلوماسية يونانية على نشاطات "حكومة الظل الشبابية
- نادي "نهارالشباب" في جامعة سيدة اللويزة اطلق حملة "لا للحرب
- جامعة سيدة اللويزة كرمت 3 من طلابها نالوا "جائزة سعيد عقل

== See also ==
- Gebran Tueni
- May Chidiac
