= Sina Kammerschmitt =

German sprinter (born 2006)

Personal information
- Born: 17 September 2003 (age 22)

Sport
- Sport: Athletics
- Event: Sprint

Achievements and titles
- Personal bests: 60 m: 7.21 (2026); 100 m: 11.32 (2025); 200 m: 24.15 (2025)
Medal record
Women's athletics
Representing Germany
European U20 Championships
Silver medal – second place	2021 Tallinn	4 × 100 m relay

Sina Kammerschmitt (born 17 September 2003) is a German sprinter. She placed second in the 60 metres at the German Indoor Athletics Championships in 2026.

== Biography ==
From Westhofen, Kammerschmitt started in athletics at five years-old and trained as a youngster as a member of the Worms Gymnastics Club (TGW).

Kammerschmitt was coached as a teenager by Fabian Weiland. In July 2021, she ran a wind-legal personal best for the 100 metres in Mannheim of 11.77 seconds. Kammerschmitt placed second in the 100 metres at the 2021 German U20 Championships in Rostock. Kammerschmitt won the silver medal with the German team in the 4 × 100 metres relay at the 2021 European Athletics U20 Championships in Tallinn, Estonia.

On May 29, 2022, Kammerschmitt ran 11.79 seconds at the Kurpfalz Gala 2022 Weinheim to win over 100 m in the U20 final. She placed fourth with the German team in the 4 × 100 metres relay at the 2022 World Athletics U20 Championships in Cali, Colombia.

In 2023, Kammerschmitt transferred clubs from TG Worms to join MTG Mannheim. After barely racing in 2023, Kammerschmitt ran a personal best of 11.35 seconds for the 100 metres at the senior German Athletics Championships in Braunschweig in June 2024, placing fifth overall.

Kammerschmitt made her debut with the German national team as a 21 year-old at the 2025 World Athletics Relays in Guangzhou, China in the Mixed 4 × 100 metres relay in May 2025. She lowered her personal best to 11.32 seconds for the 100 metres in August 2025 in Sondershausen.

On 28 February 2026, she lowered her personal best for the 60 metres to 7.21 seconds in finishing behind Philina Schwartz in the final of the German Indoor Athletics Championships in Dortmund. She was named for the 2026 World Athletics Relays in Gaborone, Botswana, and ran in the women’s 4 × 100 metres relay and in the mixed 4 × 100 metres relay team which both qualified from the heats on the opening day of competition, setting an inaugural European record in the mixed event. The following day, she raced as the German team placed fourth overall in the mixed final.

== Personal life ==
She was educated at IGS Osthofen.
