= Sandrey Davison =

Jamaican athlete (born 2003)

Personal information
- Nationality: Jamaican
- Born: 25 January 2003 (age 23)

Sport
- Sport: Athletics
- Event: Sprint
- Club: Sprintec; Dynamic Speed; Elite Performance
- Coached by: Corey Bennett; Maurice Wilson; Michael Frater; Reynaldo Walcott

Achievements and titles
- Personal bests: 60m: 6.51 (2026); 100m: 10.00s (2024); 200m: 20.51s (2026)
Medal record
Men's athletics
Representing Jamaica
World U20 Championships
| Silver medal – second place | 2021 Nairobi | 4×100m relay |
NACAC U20 Championships
| Bronze medal – third place | 2021 San Jose | 200m |
CARIFTA Games Junior (U20)
| Silver medal – second place | 2022 Kingston | 200m |
| Gold medal – first place | 2022 Kingston | 4x100m relay |

Sandrey Davison (born 25 January 2003) is a Jamaican sprinter.

== Early life ==
He attended St. Catherine High School in St. Catherine Parish in Jamaica.

== Career ==
In July 2021, he won an NACAC Under-20 200m bronze medal in the 100 metres in San Jose, Costa Rica. He was a silver medalist in the 4 × 100 m relay at the 2021 World Athletics Championships in Nairobi. He won back-to-back Jamaican U20 titles in the 100 metres in 2021 and 2022, lowering jis Personal best to 10.20 seconds in Kingston, Jamaica in June 2022. He competed at the 2022 World Athletics U20 Championships in Cali, Colombia. However, he suffered a hamstring tear at the championships and was unable to run the final.

Davison joined the Elite Performance Track Club in 2022 after signing a professional contract with sportswear manufacturing company Puma. However, he was only able to run four races in 2023. In March 2024, he joined the Michael Frater-led Dynamic Track Club.

In April 2024, he was selected as part of the Jamiacan team for the 2024 World Athletics Relays in Nassau, Bahamas. He ran the anchor leg for the Hanaican 4 × 100 m team that qualified for the 2024 Paris Olympics. He made his Diamond League debut at the 2024 Prefontaine Classic where he finished fifth in the 100 metres with a personal best time of 10.13 seconds.

On 1 March 2025, he placed third in the 200 metres final at the Jamaican World Athletics Indoor Championships qualifier at GC Foster College in a time of 20.75 seconds.

Davison ran a personal best 6.51 seconds for the 60 metres (+1.4) at the 2026 Gibson McCook Relays in Kingston.
