= Acetabular labrum tear =

Injury of the acetabular labrum

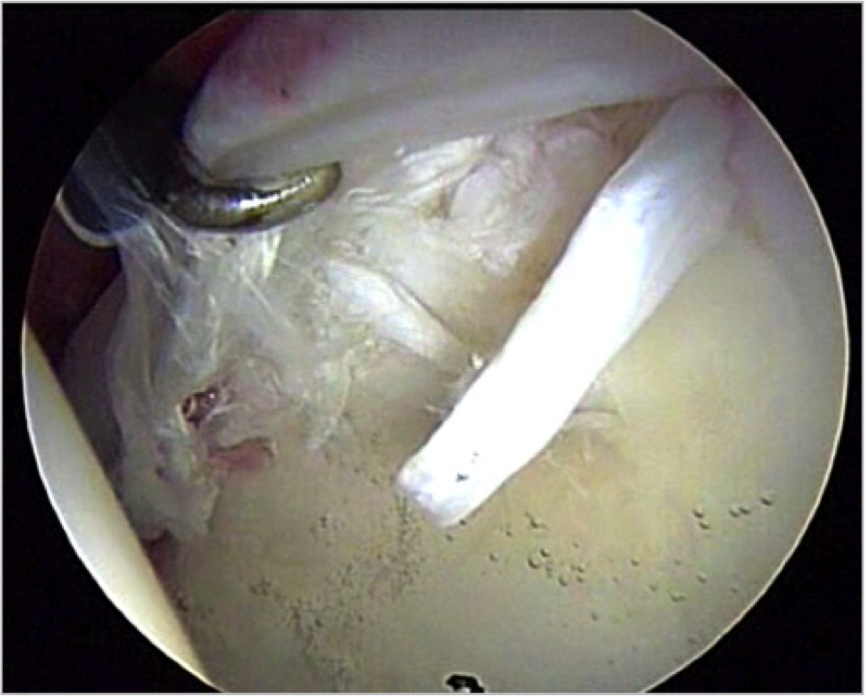
- A complex labral tear. An arthroscopic probe is seen at the junction of the labrum and acetabular rim.
- Specialty: Orthopedics
- Causes: excessive force, hip dislocation, capsular hip hypermobility, hip dysplasia, hip degeneration
- Risk factors: older age
- Diagnostic method: physical examination, medical imaging
- Treatment: surgery, physical therapy

An acetabular labrum tear or hip labrum tear is a common injury of the acetabular labrum resulting from a number of causes including running, hip dislocation, and deterioration with ageing. Most are thought to result from a gradual tear due to repetitive microtrauma.

Acetabular labrum tears present with anterior hip or groin pain, and less commonly buttock pain. Frequently, there are also mechanical symptoms including clicking, locking, and giving way. Due to the limitations of the physical examination, further diagnosis requires medical imaging.

Studies have shown that there are some differences in the tear area of the acetabular labrum in different regions, which may be related to the differences in people's living habits.

Conservative treatment is usually recommended initially, including relative rest, the use of anti-inflammatory and pain medications. Patients may also be considered for labral reconstruction surgery to help recover their athletic ability. At present, there is not enough evidence to show that physical therapy is beneficial for the acetabular labrum.

In addition, since the cause of the acetabular labrum tear has not been proven to be directly related to any specific action, this condition is difficult to prevent.

== Causes ==
It is estimated that 75% of acetabular labrum tears have an unknown cause. Tears of the labrum have been credited to a variety of causes such as excessive force, hip dislocation, capsular hip hypermobility, hip dysplasia, and hip degeneration. A tight iliopsoas tendon has also been attributed to labrum tears by causing compression or traction injuries that eventually lead to a labrum tear. Most labrum tears are thought to be from gradual tear due to repetitive microtrauma. Incidents of labrum tears increase with age, suggesting that they may also be caused by deterioration through the aging process. Labrum tears in athletes can occur from a single event or recurring trauma. Running can cause labrum tears due to the labrum being used more for weight bearing and taking excessive force while at the end-range motion of the leg: hyperabduction, hyperextension, hyperflexion, excessive external rotation. Sporting activities are likely causes, specifically those that require frequent lateral rotation or pivoting on a loaded femur as in hockey or ballet. Constant hip rotation places increased stress on the capsular tissue and damage to the iliofemoral ligament. This in turn causes hip rotational instability putting increased pressure on the labrum. Traumatic injuries are most commonly seen in athletes who participate in contact or high-impact sports like football, soccer, or golf. The prevalence rate for traumatic hip injuries that causes a tear of the labrum is very low. Less than 25% of all patients can relate a specific incident to their torn labrum; however, they are often a result of a dislocation or fracture. Falling on one's side causes a blunt trauma to the greater trochanter of the femur. Since there is very little soft tissue to diminish the force between the impact and the greater trochanter, the entire blow is transferred to the surface of the hip joint. And since bone density does not reach its peak until the age of 30, hip traumas could result in a fracture. Tears of the hip labrum can be classified in a variety of ways, including morphology, etiology, location, or severity.

Anatomical modifications of the femur and or hip socket cause a slow buildup of damage to the cartilage. Femur or acetabular dysplasia can lead to femoral acetabular impingement (FAI). Impingement occurs when the femoral head rubs abnormally or lacks a full range of motion in the acetabular socket. There are three different forms of FAI. The first form is caused by a cam-deformity where extra bone is present on the femoral head, which leads to the head being non-spherical. The second deformity is referred to as a pincer deformity and it is due to an excess growth of the acetabular socket. The third type of FAI is a combination of the first two deformities. When either abnormality is present, it changes the position of the femoral head in the hip socket. The increased stresses that the femur and or acetabulum experience may lead to a fracture of the acetabular rim or a detachment of the overstressed labrum.

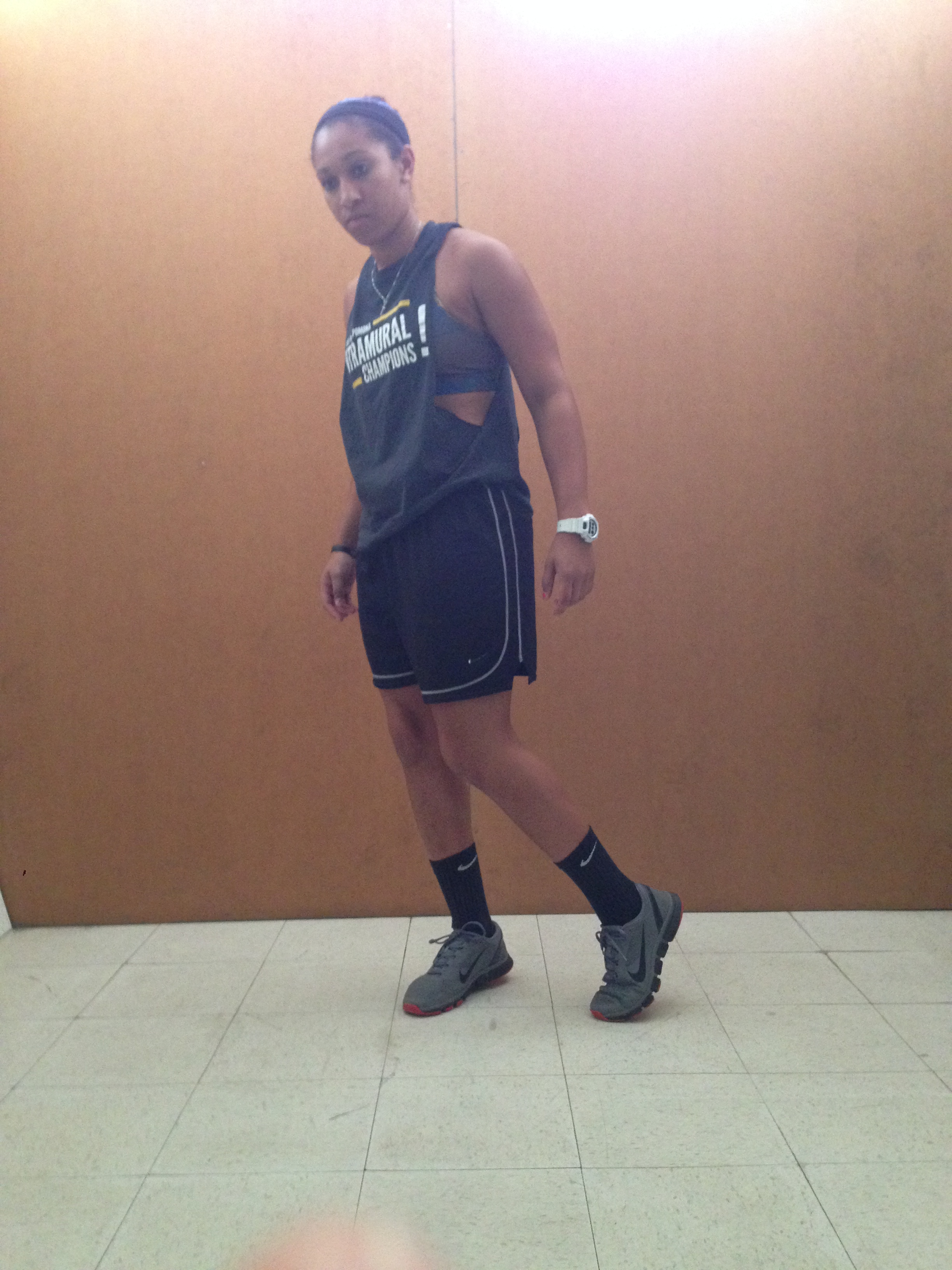
Women are more susceptible to acetabulum labrum tears due to their pelvic anatomy.

== Diagnosis ==
An acetabular labrum tear is assessed by physical examination followed by medical imaging. An MR arthrogram is more reliable than magnetic resonance imaging. A full confirmation can be made using arthroscopy.

== Epidemiology ==
In the United States acetabular labrum tears usually occur in the anterior or anterior-superior area, possibly due to a sudden change from labrum to acetabular cartilage. The most common labrum tears in Japan are in the posterior region, likely due to the customary practice of sitting on the floor. Posterior labrum tears in the Western world usually occur when a force drives the femoral head posteriorly which transfers shear and compressive forces to the posterior labrum.

== Rehabilitation ==
There is little evidence for the benefit of physical therapy for the acetabular labrum. Some studies though report that physical therapy could be of benefit in restoring "sports-ready" capabilities. Following surgery, such as labral reconstruction which has shown promising results in helping people by using an iliotibial band graft. Patients will use crutches for up to six weeks and physical exercise such as running, curtailed for at least six months.

There are usually four phases in the rehabilitation process: "Phase I: initial exercises (weeks 1–4), Phase II: intermediate exercises (weeks 5–7), Phase III: advanced exercises (weeks 8–12), and Phase IV: return to sports (weeks 12+)". Therapy programs need to be personalised.

In phase I the first objective is to minimize pain and inflammation. A symmetrical gait pattern is essential so as not to create an imbalance in the muscles of the hip. Aquatic therapy enables more gravity-free movement.

In phase II more flexibility in the soft tissue is promoted, with an emphasis on strength training basics.

In phase III the focus is to begin building functional strength, using single leg exercises to build the muscle and challenge the strength of the hip.

Phase IV is the final stage where further exercise is prescribed until returning to sports. Complex movements like squatting, kicking, and running, will be promoted until symmetrical pain free movements are achieved.

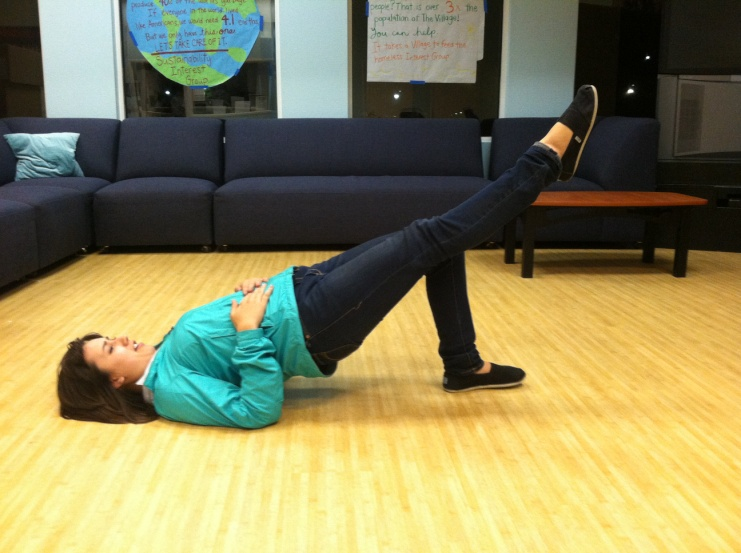
Single leg bridge

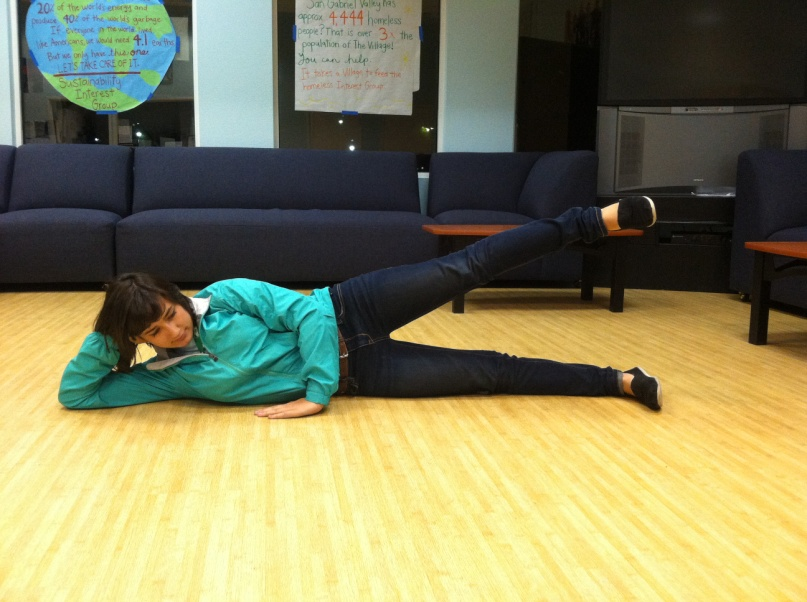
Side leg raise

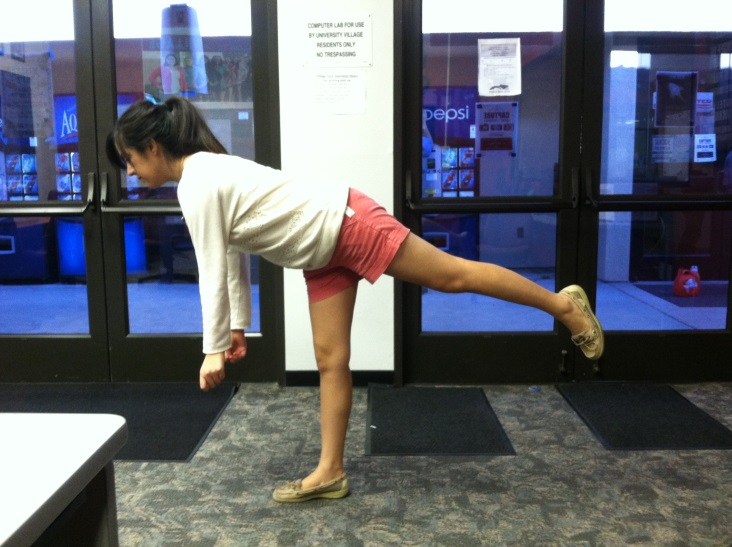
Single leg balance

== Prevention ==
An acetabular labrum tear can occur in a variety of ways such as frequent twisting movement, direct trauma, or degeneration. But many hip labral tears are not directly related to any specific action, making it difficult to prevent such an injury. It may be possible to lower the risk by strengthening the gluteus, stretching before exercise, and discontinuing the use of repetitive twisting activities.

One way to prevent a hip labrum tear is to decrease the pressure on the anterior labrum region. The labrum is about 2 to 3 mm thick but is wider and thinner in the anterior portion. Studies have found that in the United States and European countries, hip labral tears are commonly found in the anterior region. Muscular imbalance of the pelvis can develop lower crossed syndrome. It is caused by tight hip flexors and erector spinae with inhibited weak gluteals and abdominals. Imbalance of the muscles can lead to an anterior pelvic tilt, increased hip flexion, and lumbar hyperlordosis of the lumbar spine. This increases the pressure in the anterior labrum. Weak gluteals during hip extension have also shown increased joint pressure in the anterior labrum. Muscles that help with balance need to be strengthened, or stretched to prevent a hip labrum tear. Exercises include strengthening the gluteus by abducting the hip whilst lying on the side with legs together. The top leg is raised keeping the knee and hip straight; especially effective where there is an anterior pelvic tilt. A tight hip flexor may be stretched by using a kneeling hip flexor stretch that targets the iliopsoas.

Stretching before exercise will affect the cartilage through "creep". It will place a constant load on the labrum, allowing fluid the leak out and deform to the applied load. This is significant for the viscoelasticity of the labrum. The hip labrum acts as a shock absorber, joint lubricator, stabilizer and pressure distributor. A warm-up using body weight squats can induce creep before exercise to help prevent a hip labrum tear.

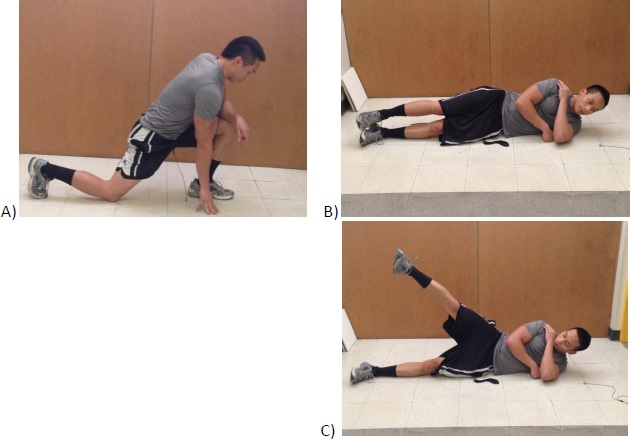
In A), Stretch of a right hip flexor, iliopsoas. The weight bearing knee (left) does not go past the toes. Leaning forward for a good stretch and holding it for about 15 to 20 seconds is needed. In B), The starting position for the side lying hip abduction. The top leg needs to be lifted straight up and repeated 10 times.

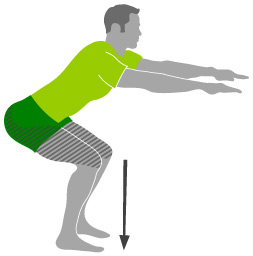
A body weight squat with no added weights allows legs to be warmed up, creep may be induced in the cartilage and muscles to prepare for intense exercise.

Strain vs. Time graph for the three stages of creep. Strain slowly rises up and almost becomes constant from a constant stress on a viscoelastic material. Like cartilage, it will deform or strain, from constant stress. The strain deformation is slow, but eventually too much stress will increase it.

== See also ==
- Glenoid labrum
