= Eliezer Adjibi =

Canadian sprinter

Personal information
- Born: 23 September 2000 (age 25) Porto-Novo, Benin
- Home town: Ottawa, Ontario

Sport
- Sport: Athletics
- Event: Sprint

Achievements and titles
- Personal best: 100 m: 9.92 A (2026)
Medal record
Men's athletics
Representing Canada
World Relay Championships
Gold medal – first place	2025 Guangzhou	Mixed 4 × 100 m relay
Silver medal – second place	2026 Gaborone	Mixed 4 × 100 m relay
Pan American Championships
Silver medal – second place	2026 Medellín	100 m
NACAC Championships
Gold medal – first place	2025 Freeport	4 × 100 m relay

Eliezer Adjibi (born 23 September 2000) is a Canadian sprinter.

== Early life ==
He was born in Benin before living in Ottawa, Canada. He attended Louis-Riel High School and was initially a soccer player but began sprinting in grade 11 and had encouragement and guidance from Louis Riel Dome coach Lotfi Khaida, who competed for Algeria in the 1988 and 1992 Olympics. In his senior year he won silver and bronze medals in the Under-20 and 100 metres and 200 metres races at the 2018 Canadian Track and Field Championships. He later studied mechanical engineering at the University of Ottawa.

== Career ==
He is the a member of the C.A.N.I. Club where he is coached by former sprinter Lyndon George. At the Niagara 2022 Canada Summer Games, his 100m time of 10.32 seconds broke the previous Canada Games’ record which has been co-held by three men since 2017. That year, he also lowered his personal best time to 10.23 seconds and placed fourth at the Canadian Athletics Championships.

In June 2024, Adjibi ran a personal best 10.04 seconds for the 100 metres (+2.00 m/s). At the same event he also ran a wind-assisted 9.98 seconds. Later that month, he claimed second place in the 100 metres at the 2024 Canadian Athletics Championships in a time of 10.23 seconds, three one-hundredths of a second off the winning time posted by Olympic medallist Andre De Grasse. Subsequently, he was named as part of the Canadian relay pool for the 2024 Olympic Games.

He was named in the Canadian team for the 2025 World Athletics Relays in China, in May 2025. He ran the anchor leg of the mixed 4 x 100 metres relay, which made its debut as an event at the championships, as Canada won their heat and clinched their place in the final with the fastest time. In the final, he ran as the Canadian team won the gold medal in the event. On 22 June 2025 at the Bob Vigars Classic in London, Ontario, he lowered his personal best for the 100 metres when he ran a wind legal 10.02 seconds (+1.5 m/s). He finished fourth in the 100 metres at the 2025 NACAC Championships in Freeport, The Bahamas in 10.16 seconds (+0.4).

He was named in the Canadian team for the 2025 World Athletics Championships in Tokyo, Japan.

Adjibi won the 60 metres at the 2026 Canadian Indoor Athletics Championships in a championship record 6.62 seconds. He was selected as part of the Canadian team for the 2026 World Athletics Relays. In the mixed 4 x 100 metres relay he was part of the team which briefly set a new world record time of 40.07 seconds, until it was broken by Jamaica in the following heat. The following day, the quartet won the silver medal behind Jamaica in the final. Selected as part of the Canadian team for the inaugural 2026 Pan American Championships in Athletics in Medellín, he placed second in the 100 metres final, running a new personal best of 9.92 seconds on 26 June, finishing runner-up to Colombian Ronal Longa. He competed in the 100 metres at the 2026 Commonwealth Games in Glasgow, Scotland, without advancing to the semi-finals.
