= 2021 World Athletics U20 Championships – Men's 4 × 100 metres relay =

Men's 4 × 100 metres relay at the 2021 World Athletics U20 Championships
- Venue: Kasarani Stadium
- Dates: 21–22 August
- Competitors: 59 from 14 nations
- Winning time: 38.51

Medalists
gold medal	Mihlali Xhotyen; Sinesipho Dambile; Letlhogonolo Moleyane; Benjamin Richardson; *Henru Olivier; *Bradley Oliphant	South Africa
silver medal	Alexavier Monfries; Bryan Levell; Andrew Gilipps; Sandrey Davison	Jamaica
bronze medal	Dominik Łuczynski; Patryk Krupa; Jakub Pietrusa; Oliwer Wdowik	Poland

The men's 4 × 100 metres relay at the 2021 World Athletics U20 Championships was held at the Kasarani Stadium on 21 and 22 August.

== Records ==
Standing records prior to the 2021 World Athletics U20 Championships
World U20 Record	United States	38.62	San José, Costa Rica	20 July 2019
Championship Record	United States	38.66	Grosseto, Italy	18 July 2004
World U20 Leading	Brazil	38.90	Chula Vista, United States	24 April 2021

== Results ==
=== Heats ===
Qualification: First 3 of each heat ( Q ) plus the 2 fastest times ( q ) qualified for the final.

Rank	Heat	Nation	Athletes	Time	Notes
1	1	Poland	Dominik Łuczynski, Patryk Krupa, Jakub Pietrusa, Oliwer Wdowik	38.93	Q, AU20R
2	1	Jamaica	Alexavier Monfries, Bryan Levell, Andrew Gilipps, Sandrey Davison	39.00	Q, SB
3	2	South Africa	Mihlali Xhotyen, Henru Olivier, Letlhogonolo Moleyane, Bradley Oliphant	39.33	Q, AU20R
4	1	Nigeria	Kingsley Emeka Unorji, Ogheneovo Nicholas Mabilo, Adekalu Nicholas Fakorede, Godson Oke Oghenebrume	39.33	Q, NU20R
5	2	Italy	Angelo Ulisse, Matteo Melluzzo, Filippo Cappelletti, Lorenzo Ndele Simonelli	39.56	Q, SB
6	1	Colombia	Neider Abello, John Paredes, Jhon Berrío, Carlos Flórez	40.04	q, NU20R
7	2	Greece	Konstantinos Milios, Ioannis Kariofyllis, Ioannis Granitsiotis, Nikolaos Panagiotopoulos	40.13	Q, NU20R
8	2	Saudi Arabia	Nasser Mahmoud Mohammed, Ali Ahmed Ali, Sultan Kaabi, Anbar Jamaan Al-Zahrani	40.40	q, SB
9	1	Eswatini	Lihle Gininindza, Ayanda Malaza, Bongumenzi Mbingo, Lwazi Menziwokuhle Msibi	41.34	NU20R
10	1	Finland	Eino Vuori, Arttu Peltola, Niko Kangasoja, Alexander Björkgren	50.88	
	2	Botswana	Allison Kenosi, Jayson Mandoze, Godiraone Lobatlamang, Tumo Stagato Lesesere	DQ	TR16.8
	2	Ecuador	Alan Minda, Katriel Angulo, Miguel Ángel Maldonado, Steeven Salas	DQ	TR16.8
	2	Brazil	Hygor Gabriel Bezerra, Izaias Alves, Igor Clemente Medeiros, Renan Correa	DQ	TR17.3.1
	1	Qatar	Nayef Mubarak Al-Rashidi, Oumar Abakar, Mahamat Zakaria Khalid, Amar Ebed	DQ	TR17.3.1

=== Final ===
The final was held on 22 August at 16:46.

Rank	Lane	Nation	Athletes	Time	Notes
1st place, gold medalist(s)	3	South Africa	Mihlali Xhotyen, Sinesipho Dambile, Letlhogonolo Moleyane, Benjamin Richardson	38.51	WU20R
2nd place, silver medalist(s)	6	Jamaica	Alexavier Monfries, Bryan Levell, Andrew Gilipps, Sandrey Davison	38.61	AU20R
3rd place, bronze medalist(s)	5	Poland	Dominik Łuczynski, Patryk Krupa, Jakub Pietrusa, Oliwer Wdowik	38.90	AU20R
4	4	Italy	Angelo Ulisse, Matteo Melluzzo, Filippo Cappelletti, Lorenzo Simonelli	39.28	NU20R
5	1	Colombia	Neider Abello, John Paredes, Jhon Berrío, Carlos Flórez	40.00	NU20R
6	7	Greece	Konstantinos Milios, Ioannis Kariofyllis, Ioannis Granitsiotis, Nikolaos Panagiotopoulos	40.07	NU20R
	8	Nigeria	Adekalu Nicholas Fakorede, Ogheneovo Nicholas Mabilo, Udodi Onwuzurike, Godson Oke Oghenebrume	DNF	
	2	Saudi Arabia	Nasser Mahmoud Mohammed, Ali Ahmed Ali, Sultan Kaabi, Anbar Jamaan Al-Zahrani	DQ	TR24.7
