= Krystal Sloley =

Jamaican athlete

Personal information
- Nationality: Jamaican
- Born: Krystal Tuckerlee Sloley; 24 April 2002 (age 24)

Sport
- Sport: Athletics
- Event: Sprint
- College team: UTECH

Achievements and titles
- Personal bests: 60m: 7.15 (Kingston, 2026); 100m: 10.99 (Kingston, 2024)
Medal record
Women's athletics
Representing Jamaica
World Relays
Silver medal – second place	2025 Guangzhou	mixed 4×100 m relay

Krystal Tuckerlee Sloley (born 24 April 2002) is a Jamaican sprinter. She made her senior international debut for Jamaica at the 2025 World Athletics Relays, winning a silver medal in the mixed 4 x 100 metres relay.

== Early life ==
She attended Ardenne High School in Kingston, Jamaica before attending Campion College and the University of Technology, Jamaica.

== Career ==
A member of the MVP Race Club, Sloley travelled to Europe in 2023 to run World Athletics Continental Tour events across the summer. She won the 100 metres at the Meeting Arcobaleno EAP AtleticaEuropa in Celle Ligure, Italy ahead of Mia Gross and compatriot Tia Clayton on 19 July. She then ran 11.30 in Luxembourg in late July 2023, and 11.27 seconds for the 100 metres at the Meeting Brazzale Vicenza 2023 in Italy on August 8, 2023.

She ran 11.09 seconds for the 100 metres to finish second at the Jamaica International in May 2024. On 1 June 2024 she lowered her personal best again to 10.99 seconds at the 2024 Racers Grand Prix. Later that month, she finished sixth in the final of the 100 metres at the Jamaica Athletics Championships in Kingston, Jamaica.

On 24 April 2025, she was named in the Jamaican team for the 2025 World Athletics Relays in Guangzhou, China in May 2025. She ran as part of the mixed 4 x 100 metres relay alongside Javari Thomas, Natasha Morrison and Rasheed Foster, which made its debut as an event at the championships, as Jamaica clinched their place in the final in 41.04 seconds. In the final, the team of Sloley, Thomas, Bryan Levell, and Serena Cole won the silver medal in the event.

Sloley ran a personal best 7.15 seconds for the 60 metres (+1.4) at the 2026 Gibson McCook Relays in Kingston. She was named in the Jamaica team for the 2026 Central American and Caribbean Games.
