= Javari Thomas =

Jamaican sprinter (born 2001)

Personal information
- Nationality: Jamaican
- Born: 25 September 2001 (age 25)

Sport
- Sport: Athletics
- Event: Sprint

Achievements and titles
- Personal bests: 60 m: 6.58 (2025); 100 m: 10.09 (2026); 200 m: 20.13 (2026)
Medal record
Men's athletics
Representing Jamaica
World Relays
Silver medal – second place	2025 Guangzhou	mixed 4 × 100 m relay
CAC Games
Silver medal – second place	2026 Santo Domingo	4×100m relay

Javari Thomas (born 25 September 2001) is a Jamaican sprinter. He made his senior international debut for Jamaica at the 2025 World Athletics Relays, winning a silver medal in the mixed 4 × 100 metres relay.

== Biography ==
He attended St Jago High School where he was coached by Michael Frater from 2019.

== Career ==
In May 2024, he set a personal best for the 100 metres of 10.11 seconds, in Kingston, Jamaica. He was third in a personal best 20.32 seconds in the 200 metres at the Jamaican Athletics Championships in June 2024.

He ran a personal best 6.58 second for the 60 metres in February 2025 in Kingston, Jamaica. In April 2025, he set a new seasons best for the 100 metres of 10.24 seconds, also in Kingston. He was selected for the Jamaican relay pool for the 2025 World Athletics Relays. He was a silver medalist the inaugural Mixed 4 × 100 metres in China, running the final alongside Krystal Sloley, Bryan Levell, and Serena Cole. The team of Thomas, Sloley, Natasha Morrison and Rasheed Foster had qualified second fastest for the final, running 41.04 seconds to win their heat ahead of the Great British team.

He was named in the Jamaica team for the 2026 Central American and Caribbean Games.
