= Bryan Levell =

Jamaican athlete (born 2003)

- Levell in 2026

Personal information
- Nationality: Jamaican
- Born: 23 December 2003 (age 22)
- Height: 1.85 m (6 ft 1 in)

Sport
- Sport: Athletics
- Event: Sprint
- Club: Uptimum Track Club
- Coached by: Shanikie Osbourne

Achievements and titles
- Personal bests: 60m: 6.47 (Kingston, 2026); 100m: 9.82 (Eisenstadt, 2025); 200m: 19.64 (Tokyo, 2025)
Medal record
Men's athletics
Representing Jamaica
World Championships
Bronze medal – third place	2025 Tokyo	200 m
World Relays
Silver medal – second place	2025 Guangzhou	mixed 4×100 m relay
World U20 Championships
Silver medal – second place	2021 Nairobi	4×100m relay
Silver medal – second place	2022 Cali	4×100m relay
CARIFTA Games Junior (U20)
Gold medal – first place	2022 Kingston	200m
Gold medal – first place	2022 Kingston	4x100m relay
Gold medal – first place	2022 Kingston	4x400m relay

Bryan Levell (born 23 December 2003) is a Jamaican sprinter. He won the Jamaican Athletics Championships over 200 metres in 2024 and 2025, competed in the 200m at the 2024 Paris Olympics, and won the bronze medal over 200 metres at the 2025 World Championships, running a personal best time of 19.64 seconds in the final.

== Early life ==
He attended Edwin Allen High School in Frankfield, Clarendon, Jamaica. He was successful competing at the annual ISSA boys and girls Championships. At the 2022 ISSA Championships he won Edwin Allen's first ever gold medal in the class one 100m final recording 10.25 (-0.6) in a close finish.

== Career ==
He was a silver medalist in the 4 × 100 m relay at the 2021 World Athletics U20 Championships in Nairobi.

Successfully, he placed first with gold for the 200m at the 2022 CARIFTA Games in 21.18.

He finished sixth in the 200 metres final at the 2022 World Athletics U20 Championships in Cali, Colombia. He was a silver medalist in the 4 × 100 m relay at the championships.

Despite missing part of 2023 with injury, he turned professional joining coach Shanikie Osbourne in Kingston, Jamaica.

=== 2024: Olympic debut ===
He ran as part of the Jamaican 4 × 100 m relay team which qualified for the 2024 Summer Olympics in Paris at the 2024 World Athletics Relays – Men's 4 × 100 metres relay in Nassau, Bahamas.

Competing at the Jamaican national championships in June 2024, he won the 200 metres title, running a personal best time of 19.97 seconds. At the championships, he also lowered his personal best to 10.07 seconds for the 100 metres in the first qualifying heat. In the semi-final, he broke the 10-second barrier for the first time, running 9.98 seconds. In the final, he finished in fourth place in a time of 10.04 seconds He competed in the 200m at the 2024 Paris Olympics, where he reached the semi-finals.

=== 2025: World Championships medalist ===
On 24 April 2025, he was named on the Jamaican team for the 2025 World Athletics Relays in Guangzhou, China in May. He was a silver medalist for the inaugural Mixed 4 x 100 metres, running the final alongside Krystal Sloley, Javari Thomas, and Serena Cole.

That month, he was named as a challenger for the short sprints category at the 2025 Grand Slam Track event in Philadelphia, finishing second in the 100 metres with a time of 10.02 seconds. He ran a wind-assisted 200 metres in 19.79 seconds (+2.5 m/s) on 7 June 2025, to win the Racers Grand Prix, a World Athletics Continental Tour Silver meeting, in Kingston, Jamaica.

He ran a personal best 9.94 seconds in the 100 metres semifinal at the Jamaican Athletics Championships in June 2025. However, in the final, he appeared to pull-up with a leg issue and placed eighth. He returned the following day to win the national 200 metres title in a time of 20.10 seconds. The next month, he lowered his personal best for the 100 metres to 9.82 seconds whilst competing in Austria.

In September 2025, he was a bronze medalist in the 200 metres at the 2025 World Championships in Tokyo, Japan, with a personal best time of 19.64 seconds in the final.

=== 2026 ===
Levell ran a personal best 6.47 seconds for the 60 metres (+0.7) at the Gibson McCook Relays in Kingston on 1 March 2026.

He was selected to represent Jamaica in the 60 metres at the 2026 World Athletics Indoor Championships in Toruń, Poland, and ran 6.53 seconds in his heat and semi-final to reach the final. In the final, he slowed down drastically crossing the line 7th in 7.69.

He set a new meeting record for the 100 metres at Velocity Fest 19 in April, winning the 100 m final in 9.90 seconds.

In an unexpected fourth-place performance, he recorded 10.34 in the 100 metres at the JAAA Puma meet. On 4 July, he was fifth with 20.20 seconds for the 200 m at the 2026 Prefontaine Classic. In September, he was a finalist over 200 m at the inaugural World Ultimate Championship in Budapest, placing sixth overall.
