= Serena Cole =

Jamaican sprinter

Personal information
- Nationality: Jamaican
- Born: 26 June 2004 (age 22)

Sport
- Sport: Athletics
- Events: Sprint; Long Jump
- Club: MVP Track & Field Club; Swept Track Club
- Coached by: Stephen Francis; Okeil Stewart

Achievements and titles
- Personal bests: 60m: 7.14 (2026); 100m: 11.13 (2022) 200m: 24.09 (2022); Long jump: 6.36m (2022)
Medal record
Women's athletics
Representing Jamaica
World Relays
| Silver medal – second place | 2025 Guangzhou | Mixed relay |
World U20 Championships
| Gold medal – first place | 2021 Nairobi | 4×100 m relay |
| Gold medal – first place | 2022 Cali | 4×100 m relay |
| Silver medal – second place | 2022 Cali | 100 m |
Junior Pan American Games
| Gold medal – first place | 2025 Asunción | 4×100 m relay |
CARIFTA Games Junior (U20)
| Gold medal – first place | 2022 Kingston | Long jump |
| Gold medal – first place | 2022 Kingston | 4x100m relay |

Serena Cole (born 26 June 2004) is a Jamaican sprinter. A multiple-time medalist at the World Athletics U20 Championships, she was a member of the Jamaican women's 4 x 100 metres relay team that ran world U20 records in 2021 and 2022. Cole made her senior international debut for Jamaica at the 2025 World Athletics Relays, winning a silver medal in the mixed 4 x 100 metres relay.

== Early life ==
She attended Edwin Allen High School in Clarendon, Jamaica.

== Career ==
She was a member of the Jamaican women's 4 x 100 metres relay team that ran a new world U20 record of 42.94 at the 2021 World Athletics U20 Championships in Nairobi.

She was a member of the Jamaican team which won the 4 x 100 metre relay at the 2022 CARIFTA Games with a time of 42.58 to break the under-20 world record, however, the time wasn't ratified due to JADCO personnel failing to test all four members of the team. She also won the long jump title at the championships.

She was a silver medalist in the 100 metres behind compatriot Tina Clayton in the 100 metre at the 2022 World Athletics U20 Championships. She then teamed up with Clayton, Kerrica Hill and Tia Clayton to win gold in the 4 x 100 metres at the championships, and broke the world U20 record with 42.59 s to win gold.

She won the U20 100m at the Jamaican Carifa Games Trials in March however she missed the Games due to a hamstring injury. In 2023, she signed a shoe contract with Nike and joined the MVP Track Club under coach Stephen Francis.

She was a silver medalist at the inaugural mixed 4 x 100 metres relay with the Jamaican team at the 2025 World Athletics Relays in China, running the final alongside Krystal Sloley, Bryan Levell, and Javari Thomas.

Cole ran a personal best 7.14 seconds for the 60 metres (+1.4) at the 2026 Gibson McCook Relays in Kingston.
