= Cheickna Traore =

Ivorian athlete (born 2000)

Personal information
- Nationality: Ivorian
- Born: 21 October 2000 (age 25)

Sport
- Sport: Athletics
- Event: Sprint
- College team: Ramapo College, Penn State University

Achievements and titles
- Personal bests: 60m: 6.52 (Michigan, 2024); 100m: 10.15 (Oregon, 2024); 200m: 19.93 (Lexington, 2024)NR
Medal record
Men's athletics
Representing the Ivory Coast
African Championships
Gold medal – first place	2026 Accra	200 m
Gold medal – first place	2026 Accra	4×100 m relay

Cheickna Traore (born 21 October 2000) is an Ivorian sprinter. In 2024, he became the Ivorian national record holder over 200 metres and won the gold medal over 200 metres at the 2026 African Championships in Athletics.

== Early life ==
He was born in the Ivory Coast but moved to the United States when he was five years old. From 2015 he attended Innovation High School and Henry Snyder High School in Jersey City, New Jersey. He then attended Ramapo College in Mahwah, New Jersey and earned his bachelor's degree. After graduation from Ramapo, he enrolled at Penn State University.

== Career ==
Running for Ramapo College, Traore set two NCAA Division III records in the 200m and ran the third-fastest 100m in division history. In his first indoor season at Penn State in 2024, he won Big Ten titles in the 60m, 200m and 4x400 and had a second-place finish in the 200m at the NCAA Indoor Championships with an indoor career best of 20.30.

He won gold in the 200 metres running for the Ivory Coast at the 2023 Francophone Games in Kinshasa in August 2023. At the same championship he also won gold as part of a victorious Ivorian 4 × 100 m relay team.

He set a new Penn State school record in the 200m outdoors with a time of 20.17 on 22 May 2024 in Lexington. The following day, Traore ran a 19.93 (2024 Paris Olympic standard time) for the 200 metres, setting a new Ivorian national record. On 7 June 2024, he won the 2024 NCAA Division I Outdoor Track and Field Championships in Eugene, Oregon, running the 200 metres in 19.95 seconds. He competed in the 200m at the 2024 Paris Olympics.

In May 2026, he won the gold medal in the 200 metres at the 2026 African Championships in Athletics in Accra, Ghana. Later that month, he placed fourth in the 200 metres at the 2026 Meeting International Mohammed VI d'Athlétisme de Rabat.

== See also ==
- List of Pennsylvania State University Olympians
