= Kyree King =

American sprinter (born 1994)

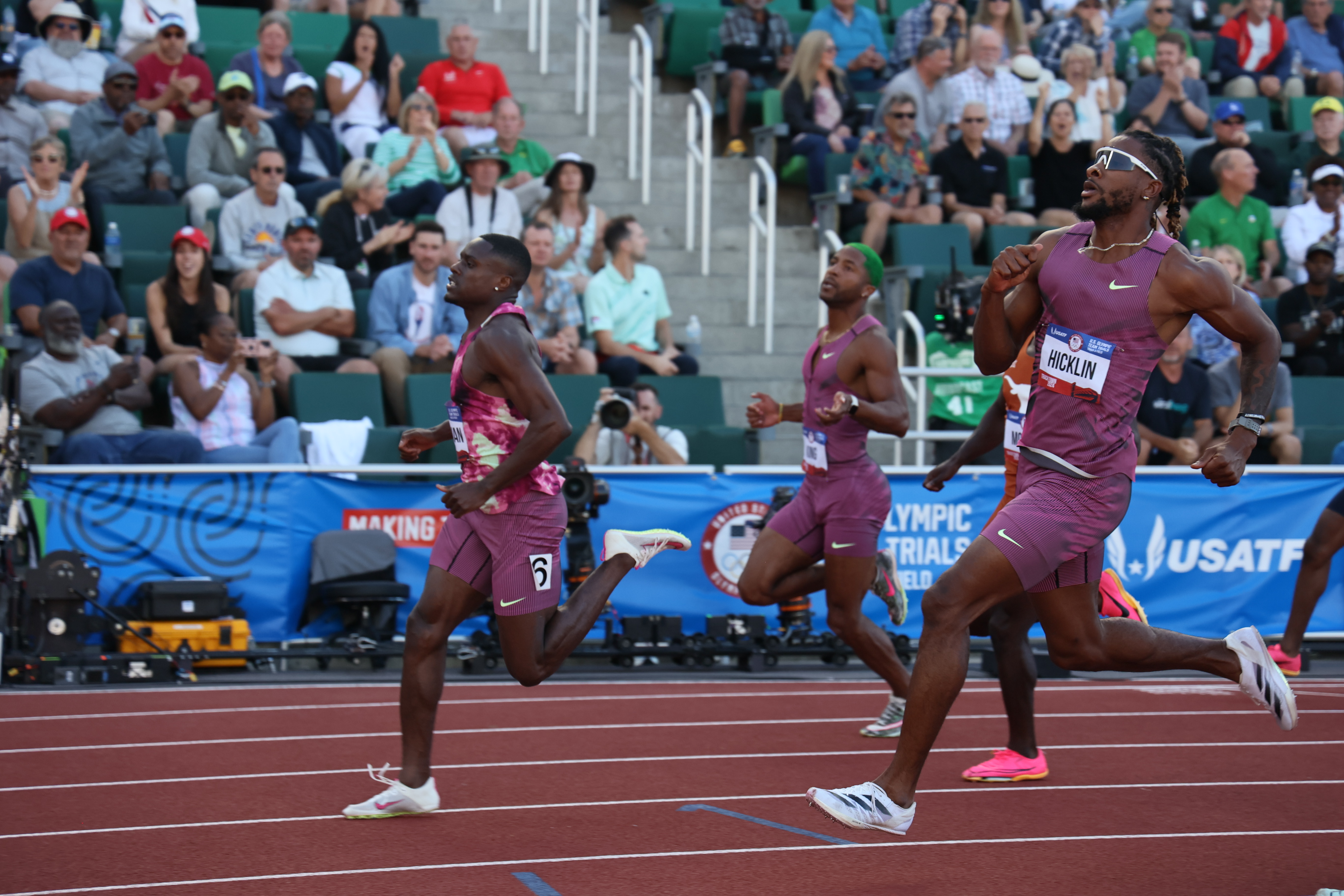
- King at the 2024 United States Olympic trials

Personal information
- Born: July 9, 1994 (age 32)
- Education: Mt. San Antonio College, Western Kentucky University, University of Oregon

Sport
- Country: United States
- Sport: Athletics
- Events: 100 m, 200 m
- College team: Western Kentucky Hilltoppers; Oregon Ducks

Achievements and titles
- Personal bests: Outdoor; 100 m: 9.96 (Eugene, 2022); 200 m: 19.90 (Eugene 2024); Indoor; 60 m: 6.57 (College Station 2017); 200 m: 21.02 (New York 2017)
Medal record
Men's athletics
Representing United States
World Relays
Gold medal – first place	2024 Nassau	4 × 100 m relay
Silver medal – second place	2025 Guangzhou	4 × 100 m relay
Bronze medal – third place	2026 Gaborone	Mixed 4 × 100 m relay
NACAC Championships
Gold medal – first place	2022 Freeport	4 × 100 m relay
Silver medal – second place	2022 Freeport	100 m
Silver medal – second place	2022 Freeport	200 m

Kyree King (born July 9, 1994) is an American sprinter.

== Biography ==
=== Early career ===
After initially competing for Mt. San Antonio College in the California Community College Athletic Association, King competed collegiately at Western Kentucky before transferring to Oregon his senior year. He was an All-American in the 200 meters and was the 2017 Pac-12 Men's Track Athlete of the Year after winning the Pac-12 titles in the 100 meters, 200 meters and 4 × 100 m relay that year.

On 10 August 2020, he ran 10.04 seconds for the 100 m at the Montverde Academy, Montverde, Florida which placed him 9th on the year list worldwide for 2020.

He was a silver medalist in the 100 m at the 2022 NACAC Championships held at the Grand Bahama Sport Complex in Freeport, Grand Bahama. He was then part of the victorious American 4 × 100 m relay that won gold at the event.

Competing at the 2023 USA Outdoor Track and Field Championships, in Eugene, Oregon, he reached the semi-finals of the 100 m and 200 m competitions.

=== 2024 ===
In April 2024, he was selected as part of the American team for the World Athletics Relays in Nassau, Bahamas. In May 2024, he finished third in the 200 metres at the Doha Diamond League. Later that month he won the 100 metres in 10.11 seconds at the LA Grand Prix, and finished third at the 2024 Prefontaine Classic in the 200 metres. In June 2024, he finished second in the 100 m at the BAUHAUS-galan Diamond League event in Stockholm. He competed in the men's 4 × 100 metres relay at the 2024 Paris Olympics.

=== 2025 ===
He was selected for the US team for the 2025 World Athletics Relays in China. He ran as part of the men's 4 × 100 m relay team which won their heat and qualified a team for the World Championships before finishing in second place overall. He finished sixth over 200 metres in May 2025 at both the Doha and Rabat Diamond Leagues. He then finished third over 200 metres in Stockholm at the BAUHAUS-galan in June, all events part of the 2025 Diamond League. He placed sixth in the 200 metres at the Diamond League Final in Zurich on 28 August.

He reached the final of the 200 metres and the semi-finals of the 100 metres at the 2025 USA Outdoor Track and Field Championships, placing seventh overall in the 200 metres.

=== 2026 ===
King was named in the United States team for the 2026 World Athletics Relays in Gaborone, Botswana. He ran in the final of the mixed 4 x 100 metres as the American team won the bronze medal behind Jamaica and Canada. In September, he competed over 200 m at the inaugural World Ultimate Championship in Budapest.
