= 2025 World Athletics Relays =

Athletics competition in Guangzhou, China

- Host city: Guangzhou, China
- Edition: 7th
- Events: 6
- Dates: 10–11 May 2025
- Main venue: Guangdong Olympic Stadium

The 2025 World Athletics Relays (Chinese: 2025世界田联接力赛) was held at the Guangdong Olympic Stadium in Guangzhou, China, on 10 and 11 May 2025. It was the 7th edition of the World Athletics Relays and the first time the event was held in China.

The 2025 edition was the first edition to feature a mixed 4 × 100 metres relay.

== Overview ==
Initially, Guangzhou was awarded to host the 2023 World Athletics Relays, which would be held on 13 and 14 May 2023. On 31 October 2022, it was announced that the championships would be postponed to 2025 because of the COVID-19 pandemic.

The event served as a qualifying event for the 2025 World Athletics Championships in Tokyo, Japan, with the top 14 teams in each event (except the mixed 4 × 100 metres) securing qualification to the World Championships.

== Schedule ==
All times are local (UTC+8).

Day 1: 10 May 2025
Time	Event	Round
19:01	Mixed 4 × 100 m	Heats
19:22	Mixed 4 × 400 m	World Ch. Qualifying Round 1
20:03	Women's 4 × 100 m	World Ch. Qualifying Round 1
20:25	Men's 4 × 100 m	World Ch. Qualifying Round 1
20:53	Women's 4 × 400 m	World Ch. Qualifying Round 1
21:23	Men's 4 × 400 m	World Ch. Qualifying Round 1

Day 2: 11 May 2025
Time	Event	Round
19:05	Mixed 4 × 100 m	Final
19:13	Mixed 4 × 400 m	World Ch. Qualifying Round 2
19:34	Women's 4 × 400 m	World Ch. Qualifying Round 2
19:56	Men's 4 × 400 m	World Ch. Qualifying Round 2
20:16	Women's 4 × 100 m	World Ch. Qualifying Round 2
20:32	Men's 4 × 100 m	World Ch. Qualifying Round 2
21:03	Mixed 4 × 400 m	Final
21:16	Women's 4 × 100 m	Final
21:26	Men's 4 × 100 m	Final
21:36	Women's 4 × 400 m	Final
21:49	Men's 4 × 400 m	Final

== Medal table ==
* Host nation (China)

Rank	Nation	Gold	Silver	Bronze	Total
1	South Africa	2	0	1	3
2	United States	1	2	0	3
3	Spain	1	1	0	2
4	Canada	1	0	1	2
4	Great Britain	1	0	1	2
6	Jamaica	0	1	1	2
7	Australia	0	1	0	1
7	Belgium	0	1	0	1
9	Botswana	0	0	1	1
9	Kenya	0	0	1	1
Totals (10 entries)		6	6	6	18

== Medalists ==
Event	Gold		Silver		Bronze	
Men's 4 × 100 metres relay	South Africa; Bayanda Walaza; Sinesipho Dambile; Bradley Nkoana; Akani Simbine	37.61 WL	United States; Courtney Lindsey; Kenneth Bednarek; Kyree King; Brandon Hicklin	37.66 SB	Canada; Aaron Brown; Jerome Blake; Brendon Rodney; Andre de Grasse	38.11
Men's 4 × 400 metres relay	South Africa; Gardeo Isaacs; Udeme Okon; Leendert Koekemoer; Zakithi Nene; Lythe Pillay*	2:57.50 WL	Belgium; Jonathan Sacoor; Robin Vanderbemden; Daniel Segers; Alexander Doom	2:58.19 SB	Botswana; Lee Eppie; Justice Oratile; Kabo Rankgwe; Leungo Scotch	2:58.27 SB
Women's 4 × 100 metres relay	Great Britain; Nia Wedderburn-Goodison; Amy Hunt; Bianca Williams; Success Eduan	42.21 SB	Spain; Esperança Cladera; Jaël Bestué; Paula Sevilla; María Isabel Pérez	42.28	Jamaica; Natasha Morrison; Shelly-Ann Fraser-Pryce; Tina Clayton; Shericka Jackson	42.33 SB
Women's 4 × 400 metres relay	Spain; Paula Sevilla; Eva Santidrián; Daniela Fra; Blanca Hervás	3:24.13 NR	United States; Paris Peoples; Karimah Davis; Maya Singletary; Bailey Lear	3:24.72	South Africa; Shirley Nekhubui; Miranda Charlene Coetzee; Precious Molepo; Zenéy van der Walt	3:24.84 NR
Mixed 4 × 100 metres relay details	Canada; Sade McCreath; Marie-Éloïse Leclair; Duan Asemota; Eliezer Adjibi; Gabrielle Cole*; Jacqueline Madogo*	40.30 SB	Jamaica; Serena Cole; Krystal Sloley; Javari Thomas; Bryan Levell	40.44 SB	Great Britain; Asha Philip; Kissiwaa Mensah; Jeriel Quainoo; Joe Ferguson	40.88 SB
Mixed 4 × 400 metres relay details	United States; Chris Robinson; Courtney Okolo; Johnnie Blockburger; Lynna Irby-Jackson	3:09.54 CR	Australia; Luke van Ratingen; Ellie Beer; Terrell Thorne; Carla Bull	3:12.20 AR	Kenya; David Sanayek Kapirante; Mercy Chebet; Brian Onyari Tinega; Mercy Adongo Oketch	3:13.10 SB

== Qualification system ==
On 10 November 2024, World Athletics announced the qualification system for the championships. The top 16 teams in each event at the 2024 Summer Olympic Games qualify for entry to the championships. The host country China will enter with one team in each event, regardless of any entry conditions. The remaining teams (up to 32 in total per event) will be determined through the top lists in the qualification period (1 January 2024 to 13 April 2025).

== Participating nations ==
734 athletes from 43 federations are entered to the championships.

- Australia
- Belgium
- Botswana
- Brazil
- Canada
- Chile
- China
- Chinese Taipei
- Colombia
- Denmark
- Dominican Republic
- France
- Germany
- Ghana
- Great Britain
- Guyana
- India
- Ireland
- Italy
- Ivory Coast
- Jamaica
- Japan
- Kenya
- Liberia
- Mexico
- Netherlands
- Nigeria
- Norway
- Paraguay
- Peru
- Poland
- Portugal
- Qatar
- Senegal
- South Africa
- South Korea
- Spain
- Sri Lanka
- Switzerland
- Thailand
- Uganda
- United States
- Zimbabwe
