= 2025 European Athletics Indoor Championships – Men's 60 metres =

Men's 60 metres at the 2025 European Athletics Indoor Championships
- Venue: Omnisport Apeldoorn
- Location: Apeldoorn, Netherlands
- Dates: 8 March 2025
- Competitors: 40 from 25 nations
- Winning time: 6.49 EL, PB

Medalists
gold medal	Jeremiah Azu	Great Britain
silver medal	Henrik Larsson	Sweden
bronze medal	Andrew Robertson	Great Britain

The men's 60 metres at the 2025 European Athletics Indoor Championships was held on the short track of Omnisport in Apeldoorn, Netherlands, on 8 March 2025. This was the 36th time the event was contested at the European Athletics Indoor Championships. Athletes qualified by achieving the entry standard or by their World Athletics Ranking in the event.

== Background ==
The men's 60 metres was contested 35 times before 2025, at every previous edition of the European Athletics Indoor Championships (1970–2023), with the exception of 1972 and 1981, when the 50 metres was held instead. The 2025 European Athletics Indoor Championships was held in Omnisport Apeldoorn in Apeldoorn, Netherlands. The removable indoor athletics track was retopped for these championships in September 2024.

Christian Coleman of the United States is the world record holder with a time of 6.34 s, set in 2018. The European record is held by Marcell Jacobs of Italy in 2022. The championship record of 6.42 s was set by Dwain Chambers of Great Britain in 2009.

Records before the 2025 European Athletics Indoor Championships
Record	Athlete (nation)	Time (s)	Location	Date
World record	Christian Coleman (USA)	6.34	Albuquerque, United States	18 February 2018
European record	Marcell Jacobs (ITA)	6.41	Belgrade, Serbia	19 March 2022
Championship record	Dwain Chambers (GBR)	6.42	Turin, Italy	7 March 2009
World leading	JC Stevenson (USA)	6.50	Lubbock, United States	24 January 2025
European leading	Henrik Larsson (SWE)	6.54	Düsseldorf, Germany	9 February 2025
European leading	Abel Jordán (ESP)	6.54	Madrid, Spain	22 February 2025

== Qualification ==
For the men's 60 metres, the qualification period ran from 25 February 2024 until 23 February 2025. Athletes qualified by achieving the entry standards of 6.60 s indoors or 10.05 s over 100 metres outdoors. Athletes could also qualify by virtue of their World Athletics Ranking for the event. There was a target number of 40 athletes.

== Results ==
=== Round 1 ===
Round 1 took place on 8 March, starting at 12:00 (UTC+1) in the afternoon. First 4 in each heat (Q) and the next 4 by time (q) qualified for the semi-finals.

==== Heat 1 ====
Rank	Athlete	Nation	Time	Notes
1	Andrew Robertson	Great Britain	6.60	Q, SB
2	Taymir Burnet	Netherlands	6.62	Q, =PB
3	Robin Ganter	Germany	6.63 [.625]	Q
4	Simon Hansen	Denmark	6.63 [.629]	Q, SB
5	Oliwer Wdowik	Poland	6.64	q, SB
6	Guillem Crespí	Spain	6.66	q
7	Santeri Örn	Finland	6.75	
8	Francesco Sansovini	San Marino	6.83	

==== Heat 2 ====
Rank	Athlete	Nation	Time	Notes
1	Henrik Larsson	Sweden	6.59	Q
2	Carlos Nascimento	Portugal	6.61	Q, PB
3	Elvis Afrifa	Netherlands	6.63 [.627]	Q
4	John Otugade	Great Britain	6.63 [.628]	Q
5	Stephen Baffour	Italy	6.65	q, PB
6	Adas Dambrauskas	Lithuania	6.69	q
7	Aleksa Kijanović	Serbia	6.74	
8	Sean Penalver	Gibraltar	7.38	PB

==== Heat 3 ====
Rank	Athlete	Nation	Time	Notes
1	Allan Lagui	France	6.59	Q
2	Kevin Kranz	Germany	6.60	Q
3	Anej Čurin Prapotnik	Slovenia	6.61	Q, PB
4	William Reais	Switzerland	6.66	Q
5	Eino Vuori	Finland	6.70	
6	Ján Volko	Slovakia	6.72	
7	Nsikak Ekpo	Netherlands	6.78	
8	Vasileios Myrianthopoulos	Greece	6.79	

==== Heat 4 ====
Rank	Athlete	Nation	Time	Notes
1	Jeremiah Azu	Great Britain	6.58 [.578]	Q
2	Dominik Illovszky	Hungary	6.58 [.579]	Q, PB
3	Nikola Karamanolov	Bulgaria	6.66	Q
4	Yannick Wolf	Germany	6.67	Q
5	Jean-Christian Zirignon	Sweden	6.72	
6	Mustafa Kemal Ay	Turkey	6.77 [.761]	
7	Sotirios Garaganis	Greece	6.77 [.766]	
8	Beppe Grillo	Malta	6.83	PB

==== Heat 5 ====
Rank	Athlete	Nation	Time	Notes
1	Karl Erik Nazarov	Estonia	6.61	Q, SB
2	Toluwabori Akinola	Ireland	6.66	Q
3	Abel Jordán	Spain	6.67 [.663]	Q
4	Samuele Ceccarelli	Italy	6.67 [.670]	Q
5	Hristo Iliev	Bulgaria	6.71	
6	Ertan Özkan	Turkey	6.74 [.734]	
7	Nikolaos Panagiotopoulos	Greece	6.74 [.740]	PB
8	Delvis Santos	Portugal	6.77	

=== Semi-finals ===
The semi-finals took place on 8 March, starting at 19:10 (UTC+1) in the evening. First 2 in each heat (Q) and the next 2 by time (q) qualified for the final.

==== Heat 1 ====
Rank	Athlete	Nation	Time	Notes
1	Jeremiah Azu	Great Britain	6.52	Q, EL, PB
2	Elvis Afrifa	Netherlands	6.57	Q, PB
3	Kevin Kranz	Germany	6.58	q
4	Adas Dambrauskas	Lithuania	6.62 [.614]	=NR
5	Oliwer Wdowik	Poland	6.62 [.618]	SB
6	Anej Čurin Prapotnik	Slovenia	6.65 [.643]	
7	Dominik Illovszky	Hungary	6.65 [.645]	
8	William Reais	Switzerland	6.70	

==== Heat 2 ====
Rank	Athlete	Nation	Time	Notes
1	Andrew Robertson	Great Britain	6.57	Q, SB
2	Henrik Larsson	Sweden	6.58	Q
3	Taymir Burnet	Netherlands	6.61	q, PB
4	Toluwabori Akinola	Ireland	6.63	
5	Yannick Wolf	Germany	6.64	
6	Simon Hansen	Denmark	6.66	
7	Stephen Baffour	Italy	6.67	
8	Abel Jordán	Spain	6.68	

==== Heat 3 ====
Rank	Athlete	Nation	Time	Notes
1	Guillem Crespí	Spain	6.58	Q, PB
2	Carlos Nascimento	Portugal	6.61	Q, =PB
3	Robin Ganter	Germany	6.65 [.647]	
3	Karl Erik Nazarov	Estonia	6.65 [.647]	
5	John Otugade	Great Britain	6.67	
6	Samuele Ceccarelli	Italy	6.68	
7	Allan Lagui	France	6.72	
8	Nikola Karamanolov	Bulgaria	6.82	

=== Final ===
The final took place on for 8 March, starting at 21:40 (UTC+1) in the evening.

Rank	Athlete	Nation	Time	Notes
1st place, gold medalist(s)	Jeremiah Azu	Great Britain	6.49	EL, PB
2nd place, silver medalist(s)	Henrik Larsson	Sweden	6.52	NR
3rd place, bronze medalist(s)	Andrew Robertson	Great Britain	6.55 [.544]	SB
4	Elvis Afrifa	Netherlands	6.55 [.550]	NR
5	Kevin Kranz	Germany	6.57	=SB
6	Guillem Crespí	Spain	6.59	
7	Carlos Nascimento	Portugal	6.62	
8	Taymir Burnet	Netherlands	6.66	
