= Naoki =

- Gender: Male

Origin
- Origin: Japanese
- Meaning: Different meanings depending on the kanji used

Naoki (直樹) is a masculine Japanese given name and surname. Notable people with the name include:

- Naoki Abe (阿部 直紀; born 1945), Japanese long jumper
- Naoki Bandō (坂東 尚樹; born 1957), Japanese voice actor
- Naoki Chiba (千葉 直樹; born 1977), Japanese former football player
- Naoki Eiga (栄花 直輝; born 1967), Japanese kendoka
- Naoki Furukawa (古川 直季; born 1968), Japanese politician
- Naoki Goto (後東 尚輝; born 2002), Japanese footballer
- Naoki Hagiwara (萩原 直輝; born 1996), Japanese goalball player
- Naoki Hamaguchi (浜口 直樹; born 1981), Japanese video game programmer and director
- Naoki Hanawa (塙 尚輝; born 1976), Japanese singer and comedian
- Naoki Hane (羽根 直樹; born 1976), Japanese professional 9 dan Go player
- Naoki Hatada (畑田 真輝; born 1990), Japanese footballer
- Naoki Hatta (八田 直樹; born 1986), Japanese retired footballer
- Naoki Hattori (服部 尚貴; born 1966), Japanese motoring journalist and racing driver
- Naoki Hayashi (林 尚輝; born 1998), Japanese professional footballer
- Naoki Higashida (東田 直樹; born 1992), Japanese autistic writer
- Naoki Hiraoka (平岡 直起; born 1973), Japanese former football player and manager
- Naoki Hisaya (久弥 直樹), Japanese screenwriter
- Naoki Hommachi (本街 直樹; born 1968), Japanese former football player
- Naoki Hoshino (星野 直樹; 1892–1978), Japanese politician
- Naoki Hyakuta (百田 尚樹; born 1956), Japanese novelist, television producer, and politician
- Naoki Imamura (今村 直樹; born 1973), Japanese voice actor
- Naoki Imaya (今矢 直城; born 1980), Japanese footballer
- Naoki Inose (猪瀬 直樹; born 1946), Japanese journalist, historian, social critic and biographer
- Naoki Inoue (井上 直樹; born 1997), Japanese mixed martial artist
- Naoki Inoue (footballer) (井上 直輝; born 1997), Japanese footballer
- Naoki Inoue (sprinter) (井上 直紀; born 2003), Japanese sprinter
- Naoki Ishibashi (石橋 直希; born 1981), Japanese former football player
- Naoki Ishihara (石原 直樹; born 1984), Japanese former professional footballer
- Naoki Ishikawa (石川 直樹; born 1985), Japanese former professional footballer
- Naoki Ishikawa (kickboxer) (石川 直生; born 1989), Japanese retired kickboxer
- Naoki Ishikawa (photographer) (石川 直樹; born 1977), Japanese photographer and mountaineer
- Naoki Izumiya (泉谷 直木; born 1948), Japanese businessman and the president and CEO of Asahi Breweries
- Naoki Kanuma (鹿沼 直生; born 1997), Japanese professional footballer
- Naoki Kawaguchi (川口 尚紀; born 1994), Japanese footballer
- Naoki Kawamae (川前 直樹; born 1982), Japanese badminton player
- Naoki Kawamata (川俣 直樹; born 1985), Japanese rugby union player
- Naoki Kawano (川野 直輝; born 1982), Japanese actor and musician
- Naoki Kazama (風間 直樹; born 1966), Japanese politician
- Naoki Kobayashi (小林 直己; born 1984), Japanese dancer and actor
- Naoki Kobayashi (sprinter) (小林 直己; born 1990), Japanese track and field sprinter
- Naoki Kodaka (小高 直樹; born 1984), Japanese video game music composer
- Naoki Kojima (兒島 直樹; born 2000), Japanese track and road cyclist
- Naoki Koyama (小山 直城; born 1996), Japanese marathon runner
- Naoki Koyama (shogi professional) (小山 直希; born 1999), Japanese professional shogi player
- Naoki Kumata (熊田 直紀; born 2004), Japanese footballer
- Naoki Kunishima (國島 直希; born 1994), Japanese actor and model
- Naoki Kurita (栗田 直紀; born 1971), Japanese sport shooter
- Naoki Kuriyama (栗山 直樹; born 1990), Japanese retired footballer
- Naoki Kusumi (久住 有生; born 1972), Japanese artist
- Naoki Kusunose (楠瀬 直木; born 1964), Japanese football manager and former player
- Naoki Kuwata (桑田 尚樹; born 1977), Japanese actor and model
- Naoki Maeda (footballer, born 1994) (前田 直輝; born 1994), Japanese professional footballer
- Naoki Maeda (footballer, born 1996) (前田 尚輝; born 1996), Japanese footballer
- Naoki Matayoshi (又吉 直樹; born 1980), Japanese novelist and comedian
- Naoki Matoba (的場 直樹; born 1977), Japanese baseball player
- Naoki Matsuda (松田 直樹; 1977–2011), Japanese professional footballer
- Naoki Matsudo (松戸 直樹; born 1973), Japanese motorbike racer
- Naoki Matsumoto (松本 直樹; born 1998), Japanese professional baseball player
- Naoki Matsushita (mixed martial artist) (松下 直樹; born 1973), Japanese mixed martial artist
- Naoki Matsuyo (松代 直樹; born 1974), Japanese former football player
- Naoki Minezaki (峰崎 直樹; born 1944), Japanese politician
- Naoki Miyamoto (宮本 直毅; 1934–2012), Japanese professional Go player
- Naoki Miyanishi (宮西 尚生; born 1985), Japanese professional baseball pitcher
- Naoki Mizunuma (水沼 尚輝; born 1996), Japanese swimmer
- Naoki Monna (門奈 直樹; born 1942), Japanese sociologist
- Naoki Mori (footballer, born 1972) (森 直樹; born 1972), Japanese former football player
- Naoki Mori (footballer, born 1977) (森 直樹; born 1972), Japanese professional football manager and former player
- Naoki Mori (virologist) (森 直樹), Japanese virologist
- Naoki Motomura (本村 直樹; born 1992), Japanese rugby sevens player
- Naoki Murata (村田 直樹; 1949–2020), Japanese judoka and author
- Naoki Nagasaka (長坂 尚樹; born 1953), Japanese former racing driver
- Naoki Naito (内藤 直樹; born 1968), Japanese former football player
- Naoki Nakagawa (中川 直樹; born 1996), Japanese tennis player
- Naoki Nakahigashi (中東 直己; born 1981), Japanese professional baseball player
- Naoki Nakamura (中村 直幹; born 1996), Japanese ski jumper
- Naoki Nakamura (racing driver) (中村 直樹; born 1982), Japanese professional drifter
- Naoki Naruo (鳴尾 直軌; born 1974), Japanese former football player and manager
- Naoki Nishioka (born 2006), Japanese sprinter
- Naoki Nokubo (野久保 直樹; born 1981), Japanese television personality
- Naoki Nomura (野村 直輝; born 1991), Japanese footballer
- Naoki Okada (岡田 直樹; born 1962), Japanese politician
- Naoki Okami (born 2000), Japanese sprinter
- Naoki Otani (大谷 尚輝; born 1995), Japanese footballer
- Naoki Ozawa (小沢 直樹; born 1988), Japanese rugby union player
- Naoki Rossi (born 2007), Swiss figure skater
- Naoki Saito (さいとう なおき; born 1982), Japanese illustrator, manga artist, and YouTuber
- Naoki Saito (mathematician), Japanese mathematician
- Naoki Sakai (footballer) (酒井 直樹; born 1975), Japanese former football player
- Naoki Sakai (industrial designer) (坂井 直樹; born 1947), Japanese industrial designer
- Naoki Sakurada (桜田 直樹; born 1968), Japanese mixed martial artist
- Naoki Sanda (三田 尚希; born 1992), Japanese footballer
- Naoki Sano (佐野 直喜; born 1965), Japanese retired professional wrestler and former mixed martial artist
- Naoki Satō (佐藤 直紀; born 1970), Japanese composer
- Naoki Sato (footballer) (佐藤 尚輝; born 1996), Japanese footballer
- Naoki Satoh (baseball) (佐藤 直樹; born 1998), Japanese professional baseball outfielder
- Naoki Segi (瀬木 直貴; born 1963), Japanese film director
- Naoki Shigematsu (重松 直樹; born 1977), Japanese former competitive figure skater
- Naoki Shimura (志村 直紀; born 1941), Japanese ski jumper
- Naoki Shirane (白根 尚貴; born 1993), Japanese former professional baseball player
- Naoki Soma (相馬 直樹; born 1971), Japanese football manager and former player
- Naoki Sugai (菅井 直樹; born 1984), Japanese former football player
- Naoki Sugioka (杉岡 尚樹; born 1994), Japanese handball player
- Naoki Sugiura (杉浦 直樹; 1931–2011), Japanese actor
- Naoki Sutoh (須藤 直輝; born 2002), Japanese professional footballer
- Naoki Tajima (田島 尚輝; born 2000), Japanese tennis player
- Naoki Takahashi (高橋 直樹; born 1976), Japanese former football player
- Naoki Takashima (高島 直樹; 1950–2023), Japanese politician
- Naoki Tajima (田島 尚輝; born 2000), Japanese tennis player
- Naoki Takeshi (武子 直輝; born 1993), Japanese actor
- Naoki Takizawa (滝沢 直己; born 1960), Japanese fashion designer
- Naoki Tanaka (comedian) (田中 直樹; born 1971), Japanese comedian, actor and television presenter
- Naoki Tanaka (footballer) (田中 直基; born 1993), Japanese footballer
- Naoki Tanaka (politician) (田中 直紀; born 1940), Japanese former politician
- Naoki Tanaka (kickboxer) (田中 直樹; born 1992), Japanese kickboxer
- Naoki Tanemura (種村 直樹; 1936–2014), Japanese writer, essayist and critic
- Naoki Tanizaki (谷嵜 直樹; born 1978), Japanese professional wrestler
- Naoki Tatsuta (龍田 直樹; born 1950), Japanese voice actor
- Naoki Tokunaga (徳永 直紀; born 1966), Japanese former technical director
- Naoki Tsubaki (椿 直起; born 2000), Japanese professional footballer
- Naoki Tsukahara (塚原 直貴; born 1985), Japanese track and field sprinter
- Naoki Urasawa (浦沢 直樹; born 1960), Japanese manga artist and musician
- Naoki Urata (浦田 尚希; born 1974), Japanese former Japanese football player
- Naoki Uto (宇都 直輝; born 1991), Japanese professional basketball player
- Naoki Wako (輪湖 直樹; born 1989), Japanese footballer
- Naoki Yamada (山田 直輝; born 1990), Japanese footballer
- Naoki Yamamoto (manga artist) (山本 直樹; born 1960), Japanese manga artist
- Naoki Yamamoto (racing driver) (山本 尚貴; born 1988), Japanese racing driver
- Naoki Yanagi (矢薙 直樹; born 1972), Japanese voice actor
- Naoki Yasuzaki (安崎 直幹; born 1969), Japanese former ski jumper
- Naoki Yokomizo (横溝 直輝; born 1980), Japanese racing driver
- Naoki Yokoyama (横山 直樹; born 1949), Japanese electrical engineer
- Naoki Yoshida (吉田 直樹; born 1973), Japanese video game producer, director and designer
- Naoki Yoshikawa (吉川 尚輝; born 1995), Japanese professional baseball second baseman
- Naoki Yuasa (湯浅 直樹; born 1983), Japanese alpine ski racer
- Kazu Naoki (直木 和; 1918–1940s), Japanese football player
- Sanjugo Naoki (直木 三十五; 1891–1934), Japanese novelist

== Fictional characters ==
- Naoki Domon, a character of Gekisou Sentai Carranger
- Naoki Hanzawa, a character of Naoki Hanzawa
- Naoki Ishida, a character of Cardfight!! Vanguard
- Naoki Kashima, the name given to the Demi-Fiend protagonist in the radio play version of Shin Megami Tensei: Nocturne
- Naoki Azuma, a character in the web manga series "Takopi's Original Sin"

== See also ==
- Naoki Prize, a Japanese literary award presented semiannually
