= 2025 European Athletics U23 Championships – Men's 100 metres =

Men's 100 metres at the 2025 European Athletics U23 Championships
- Venue: Fana Stadion
- Location: Bergen, Norway
- Dates: 17 July (heats & semi-finals); 18 July (final)
- Competitors: 29 from 19 nations
- Winning time: 10.28

Medalists
| gold medal | Jeff Erius | France |
| silver medal | Nsikak Ekpo | Netherlands |
| bronze medal | Abel Jordán | Spain |

The men's 100 metres event at the 2025 European Athletics U23 Championships was held in Bergen, Norway, at Fana Stadion on 17 and 18 July.

== Records ==
Prior to the competition, the records were as follows:

| Record | Athlete (nation) | Time (s) | Location | Date |
|---|---|---|---|---|
| European U23 record | Christophe Lemaitre (FRA) | 9.92 | Albi, France | 29 July 2011 |
| Championship U23 record | Jeremiah Azu (GBR) | 10.04 | Espoo, Finland | 13 July 2023 |

== Results ==
=== Heats ===
First 3 in each heat (Q) and the next 4 fastest (q) qualified for the semi-finals.

==== Heat 1 ====
| Place | Athlete | Nation | Time | Notes |
|---|---|---|---|---|
| 1 | Emilio González | Germany | 10.49 [.485] | Q |
| 2 | Junior Tardioli | Italy | 10.49 [.486] | Q |
| 3 | Jernej Gumilar | Slovenia | 10.52 | Q |
| 4 | Gabriel Maia | Portugal | 10.58 | q |
| 5 | Marc Escandell | Spain | 10.61 | q |
| 6 | Filip Federič | Slovakia | 10.74 | |
| 7 | Vasily Klimov | Austria | 10.84 | |
| | | | Wind: (−0.9 m/s) | |

==== Heat 2 ====
| Place | Athlete | Nation | Time | Notes |
|---|---|---|---|---|
| 1 | Nsikak Ekpo | Netherlands | 10.31 | Q |
| 2 | Jeff Erius | France | 10.35 | Q |
| 3 | Jan Eric Frehe | Germany | 10.53 | Q |
| 4 | Filip Oiclj | Slovenia | 10.71 | |
| 5 | Valtteri Louko | Finland | 10.72 | |
| 6 | Mattia Silvestrelli | Italy | 10.85 | |
| 7 | Sondre Witzøe | Norway | 10.92 | |
| — | Adas Dambrauskas | Lithuania | DNS | |
| | | | Wind: (−1.8 m/s) | |

==== Heat 3 ====
| Place | Athlete | Nation | Time | Notes |
|---|---|---|---|---|
| 1 | Andrea Bernardi | Italy | 10.43 | Q |
| 2 | Heiko Gussmann | Germany | 10.45 | Q |
| 3 | Nikola Karamanolov | Bulgaria | 10.47 | Q |
| 4 | Linus Pihl | Sweden | 10.61 | |
| 5 | Michael Onilogbo | Great Britain | 10.62 | |
| 6 | Topi Huttunen | Finland | 10.65 | |
| 7 | Beppe Grillo | Malta | 10.81 | |
| | | | Wind: (−1.1 m/s) | |

==== Heat 4 ====
| Place | Athlete | Nation | Time | Notes |
|---|---|---|---|---|
| 1 | Abel Jordán | Spain | 10.43 | Q |
| 2 | Hristo Iliev | Bulgaria | 10.56 | Q |
| 3 | Seán Aigboboh | Ireland | 10.58 | Q |
| 4 | Isak Hughes | Sweden | 10.59 | q |
| 5 | Anej Čurin Prapotnik | Slovenia | 10.60 | q |
| 6 | Oleksandr Sosnovenko | Ukraine | 10.81 | |
| — | Valentin Jensen | Denmark | DNS | |
| | | | Wind: (−1.6 m/s) | |

=== Semi-finals ===
First 3 in each heat (Q) and the next 2 fastest (q) qualified for the semi-finals.

==== Heat 1 ====
| Place | Athlete | Nation | Time | Notes |
|---|---|---|---|---|
| 1 | Abel Jordán | Spain | 10.45 | Q |
| 2 | Heiko Gussmann | Germany | 10.48 | Q |
| 3 | Andrea Bernardi | Italy | 10.49 | Q |
| 4 | Jernej Gumilar | Slovenia | 10.54 [.534] | |
| 5 | Hristo Iliev | Bulgaria | 10.54 [.535] | |
| 6 | Jan Eric Frehe | Germany | 10.58 | |
| 7 | Isak Hughes | Sweden | 10.59 [.587] | |
| 8 | Gabriel Maia | Portugal | 10.59 [.589] | |
| | | | Wind: (−1.7 m/s) | |

==== Heat 2 ====
| Place | Athlete | Nation | Time | Notes |
|---|---|---|---|---|
| 1 | Jeff Erius | France | 10.28 | Q |
| 2 | Nsikak Ekpo | Netherlands | 10.30 | Q |
| 3 | Nikola Karamanolov | Bulgaria | 10.44 | Q |
| 4 | Junior Tardioli | Italy | 10.49 | q |
| 5 | Emilio González | Germany | 10.51 | q |
| 6 | Marc Escandell | Spain | 10.61 [.606] | |
| 7 | Anej Čurin Prapotnik | Slovenia | 10.61 [.607] | |
| — | Seán Aigboboh | Ireland | DNS | |
| | | | Wind: (−1.0 m/s) | |

=== Final ===
| Place | Athlete | Nation | Time | Notes |
|---|---|---|---|---|
| 1st place, gold medalist(s) | Jeff Erius | France | 10.28 | |
| 2nd place, silver medalist(s) | Nsikak Ekpo | Netherlands | 10.30 | |
| 3rd place, bronze medalist(s) | Abel Jordán | Spain | 10.31 | |
| 4 | Heiko Gussmann | Germany | 10.39 | |
| 5 | Junior Tardioli | Italy | 10.42 | |
| 6 | Andrea Bernardi | Italy | 10.43 | |
| 7 | Nikola Karamanolov | Bulgaria | 10.47 | |
| 8 | Emilio González | Germany | 10.63 | |
| | | | Wind: (−2.0 m/s) | |
