= Yannick Wolf =

German sprinter (born 2000)

Personal information
- Born: 12 May 2000 (age 26)

Sport
- Sport: Athletics
- Event: Sprint

Achievements and titles
- Personal bests: 60 m: 6.58 (2026); 100 m: 10.05 (2025); 200 m: 21.32 (2021)
Medal record
Men's athletics
Representing Germany
European Games
Gold medal – first place	2023 Kraków-Małopolska	4 × 100 m relay
European U23 Championships
Gold medal – first place	2021 Tallinn	4 × 100 m relay

Yannick Wolf (born 12 May 2000) is a German sprinter. He was won the German Athletics Championships over 100 metres and represented Germany at the World Athletics Championships and 2024 Olympic Games.

== Early and personal life ==
From Bavaria, Wolf trained as a member of SC Baierbrunn, near Munich, and then LG Stadtwerke München. Although he was keen on many sports such as football, tennis, skiing, and windsurfing as well as athletics. In 2017, he was German youth champion in the long jump, before later transitioning to sprint events. Alongside his athletics career he has worked as a member of the Bavarian State Police, and as part of their elite sports program.

== Career ==
=== Early career: Long jumper to sprinter, European U23 gold ===
Competing in Nantes, France in 2018 he jumped a personal best of 7.62 meters for the long jump. However, a succession of injuries including three dislocated shoulders and a torn patellar tendon in the knee of his takeoff leg saw him switch focus.

Wolf placed fifth in the 100 metres at the 2021 European Athletics U23 Championships in Tallinn, Estonia. He then won the gold medal in the men's 4 × 100 metres relay at the Championships, with the team setting a new U23 European record of 38.70 seconds. Unfortunately, a return of injury problems led him to miss the home European Championships in Munich in 2022.

=== 2023: German 100 m champion ===
Wolf was a member of the German 4 × 100 metres relay team alongside Julian Wagner, Joshua Hartmann and Marvin Schulte that won the 2023 European Athletics Team Championships First Division in Silesia, Poland, winning ahead of the reigning Olympic champions Italy and reigning European champions Great Britain in June 2023. The next month, he won the 100 metres title at the German Athletics Championships in 10.19 seconds in Kassel. He ran as a member of the Germany 4 × 100 metres relay team at the 2023 World Athletics Championships in Budapest.

=== 2024: Olympic debut ===
In May 2024, he ran as part of the German 4 × 100 m relay team which qualified for the 2024 Paris Olympics at the 2024 World Relays Championships in Nassau, Bahamas. That month, he showed his form with a run of 10.08 seconds for the 100 metres at the True Athletes Classic in Leverkusen. Wolf competed for Germany in the semi-finals of the 100 metres at the 2024 European Athletics Championships in Rome, without advancing to the final.

He placed third defending his 100 metres title at the 2024 German Championships. Later that summer, he ran as part of Germany team in the 4 × 100 metres relay at the 2024 Olympic Games in Paris. At the end of 2024 Wolf made the switch from LG Stadtwerke München to join Cologne Athletics.

=== 2025 ===
Wolf ran his personal best of 6.60 seconds to place runner-up to Robin Ganter at the German Indoor Athletics Championships over 60 metres in February 2025 in Dortmund. Wolf was a semi-finalist at the 2025 European Athletics Indoor Championships in Appledorn, Netherlands in March in the 60 metres. In May 2025, he competed at the 2025 World Athletics Relays in China in the Men's 4 × 100 metres relay. On the second day of the competition he helped Germany place sixth overall, having previously helped the country secure a qualifying place for the upcoming World Championships.

=== 2026 ===
Wolf ran his lifetime best 6.60 seconds to place second behind Jeremiah Azu at the ISTAF Indoor in Dusseldorf, a World Athletics Indoor Tour Silver meeting, on 24 January 2026. The following month, he lowered his personal best again, running 6.58 seconds to place fourth in the German Indoor Championships 60 metres final on 28 February 2026.

Competing at the 2026 World Athletics Relays in Gaborone, Botswana, on 2 May, he was part of the German mixed 4 × 100 metres team alongside Sophia Junk, Heiko Gussmann and Sina Kammerschmitt as they set the inaugural European record on the opening day to qualify for the final with the third fastest time behind Jamaica and Canada. The following day, he raced as the German team placed fourth overall.
