= 2021 European Athletics U23 Championships – Men's 4 × 100 metres relay =

Event at 2021 European Athletics

Men's 4 × 100 metres relay at the 2021 European Athletics U23 Championships
- Venue: Kadriorg Stadium, Tallinn
- Dates: 11 July
- Competitors: 53 from 13 nations
- Winning time: 38.70

Medalists
gold medal	Yannick Wolf; Luis Brandner; Milo Skupin-Alfa; Joshua Hartmann	Germany
silver medal	Arnau Monné; Pol Retamal; Jesús Gómez; Sergio López	Spain
bronze medal	Erik Kostrytsya; Andrii Vasyliev; Kyrylo Prykhodko; Vasyl Makukh	Ukraine

The men's 4 × 100 metres relay event at the 2021 European Athletics U23 Championships was held on Day 4 on July 11 at Kadriorg Stadium in Tallinn, Estonia.

== Records ==
Prior to the competition, the records were as follows:

European U23 record	Great Britain (GBR)	38.77	Tampere, Finland	14 July 2013
Championship U23 record	Great Britain (GBR)	38.77	Tampere, Finland	14 July 2013

== Results ==
=== Round 1 ===
Qualification rule: First 3 in each heat (Q) and the next 2 fastest (q) advance to the Final.

Rank	Heat	Nation	Athletes	Time	Notes
1	2	Germany	Yannick Wolf, Luis Brandner, Milo Skupin-Alfa, Joshua Hartmann	39.03	Q, EU23L
2	1	Spain	Arnau Monné, Pol Retamal, Jesús Gómez, Sergio López	39.50	Q
3	1	Ukraine	Erik Kostrytsya, Andrii Vasyliev, Kyrylo Prykhodko, Vasyl Makukh	39.63	Q
4	1	Czech Republic	Stanislav Jíra, Jan Trafina, Tomáš Nemejc, Štěpán Hampl	39.67	Q
5	2	Great Britain	James Hanson, Jeremiah Azu, Dominic Ashwell, Destiny Ogali	39.77	Q
6	2	Romania	Robert Sebastian Bîrsa, Marius Gabriel Tone, Alin Ionut Anton, Cristian Nicusor Roiban	40.13	Q
7	2	Latvia	Aleksandrs Kucs, Roberts Jānis Zālītis, Oskars Grava, Iļja Petrušenko	40.26	q, NU23R
8	1	Poland	Damian Trzaska, Łukasz Żok, Patryk Wykrota, Artur Łęczycki	40.37	q
9	1	Italy	Fabrizio Ceglie, Alessandro Ori, Lorenzo Paissan, Samuele Ceccarelli	40.52	
10	1	Turkey	Furkan Yıldırım, Oğuz Uyar, Berk Deniz Çelen, Cafer Güneş	40.72	
11	2	Estonia	Lukas Lessel, Henri Sai, Ken-Mark Minkovski, Robin Sapar	41.26	
	1	Denmark	Emil Mader Kjaer, Mads Lunø, Tobias Larsen, Rasmus Thornbjerg Klausen	DNF	
	2	Finland	Eeli Purola, Santeri Örn, Konsta Alatupa, Samuel Purola	DNF	

=== Final ===
Rank	Nation	Athletes	Time	Notes
1st place, gold medalist(s)	Germany	Yannick Wolf, Luis Brandner, Milo Skupin-Alfa, Joshua Hartmann	38.70	EU23R
2nd place, silver medalist(s)	Spain	Arnau Monné, Pol Retamal, Jesús Gómez, Sergio López	39.00	
3rd place, bronze medalist(s)	Ukraine	Erik Kostrytsya, Andrii Vasyliev, Kyrylo Prykhodko, Vasyl Makukh	39.45	
4	Poland	Damian Trzaska, Łukasz Żok, Patryk Wykrota, Artur Łęczycki	39.67	
5	Romania	Robert Sebastian Bîrsa, Marius Gabriel Tone, Alin Ionut Anton, Cristian Nicusor Roiban	40.15	
6	Latvia	Aleksandrs Kucs, Roberts Jānis Zālītis, Oskars Grava, Iļja Petrušenko	40.18	NU23R
	Czech Republic	Stanislav Jíra, Jan Trafina, Tomáš Nemejc, Štěpán Hampl	DNF	
	Great Britain	Dominic Ashwell, Jeremiah Azu, James Hanson, Brandon Mingeli	DNF	
