= 2023 Italian Athletics Championships =

Edition of the Italian Athletics Championships

- Dates: 28–30 July (main event)
- Host city: Molfetta (track & field); Milazzo (35 km racewalk); Gubbio (cross country); Frosinone (20 km racewalk)
- Level: Senior
- Events: 38 (track & field); 2 (35 km racewalk); 2 (20 km racewalk); 4 (cross country); 2 (10,000 m)

The 2023 Italian Athletics Championships will be the 113th edition of the Italian Athletics Championships and took place in Molfetta, Apulia (Stadio di atletica Mario Saverio Cozzoli), from 28 to 30 July.

For qualifying up to 16 athletes for each event, there will be a "Challenge Assoluto" three weeks before in Modena.

The Italian championships of the men's and women's 35 km racewalk took place in Milazzo on 29 January.

== Champions ==
=== Track & Field + 10 km walk (Molfetta 28-30 July) ===
Track events
Event	Men	Performance	Women	Performance
100 m	Samuele Ceccarelli	10.30	Zaynab Dosso	11.28
200 m	Filippo Tortu	20.14	Dalia Kaddari	22.90
400 m	Davide Re	45.21	Alessandra Bonora	52.24
800 m	Simone Barontini	1:44.50	Eloisa Coiro	2:00.43
1500 m	Pietro Arese	3:46.07	Sintayehu Vissa	4:06.85
5000 m	Jacopo De Marchi	14.02.07	Nadia Battocletti	16:08.50
110/100 m hs	Lorenzo Simonelli	13.40	Giada Carmassi	13.14
400 m hs	Mario Lambrughi	49.54	Ayomide Folorunso	54.22 NR
3000 m st	Ala Zoghlami	8:30.97	Eleonora Curtabbi	9:55.28
Road events
10 km walk (road)	Francesco Fortunato	39.50	Valentina Trapletti	44.27
Field events
High jump	Stefano Sottile	2.28 m	Elena Vallortigara	1.87 m
Pole vault	Simone Bertelli	5.40 m	Roberta Bruni	4.60 m CR=
Long jump	Filippo Randazzo	7.88 m	Ottavia Cestonaro	6.37 m
Triple jump	Andy Diaz	17.21 m	Ottavia Cestonaro	13.98 m
Shot put	Leonardo Fabbri	21.80 m	Anna Musci	15.74 m
Discus throw	Giovanni Faloci	59.81 m	Daisy Osakue	63.25 m CR
Hammer throw	Simone Falloni	71.59 m	Sara Fantini	71.02 m
Javelin throw	Roberto Orlando	76.53 m	Carolina Visca	56.54 m
Combined
Decathlon/Heptathlon	Lorenzo Naidon	8090 pts	Scilla Benussi	5334 pts

=== 10,000 m (Brescia, 7 May) ===
Event	Men	Performance	Women	Performance
10,000 m	Pietro Riva	28:21.88	Nadia Battocletti	33:06.25 PB

=== 20 km walk (Alberobello 1 May) ===
Event	Men	Performance	Women	Performance
20 km walk	Massimo Stano	1:21:21	Valentina Trapletti	1:29:47

=== 20 km walk (Frosinone, 19 March) ===
Event	Men	Performance	Women	Performance
20 km	Francesco Fortunato	1:21.11	Valentina Trapletti	1:32.57

=== Cross country (Gubbio, 11-12 March) ===
Event	Men	Performance	Women	Performance
3 km	Ala Zoghlami	8:54.	Ludovica Cavalli	
10 km / 8 km	Marco Fontana Granotto	30:35.	Nadia Battocletti	

=== 35 km walk (Milazzo, 29 January) ===
Event	Men	Performance	Women	Performance
35 km	Riccardo Orsoni	2:33:06	Sara Vitiello	2:54:06

== See also ==
- 2023 Italian Athletics Indoor Championships
