= Izumiya (surname) =

Izumiya (泉谷) is a Japanese surname. It may refer to:

- Naoki Izumiya (born 1948), Japanese businessman
- Seizo Izumiya (born 1961), Japanese martial artist, karate master, and coach
- Shigeru Izumiya (born 1948), Japanese poet, folk singer, actor, and tarento
- Shunsuke Izumiya (born 2000), Japanese hurdler

== See also ==
- Izumiya, a Japanese supermarket chain
