= 2024 European Athletics Championships – Men's 4 × 100 metres relay =

Men's 4 × 100 metres relay at the 2024 European Athletics Championships
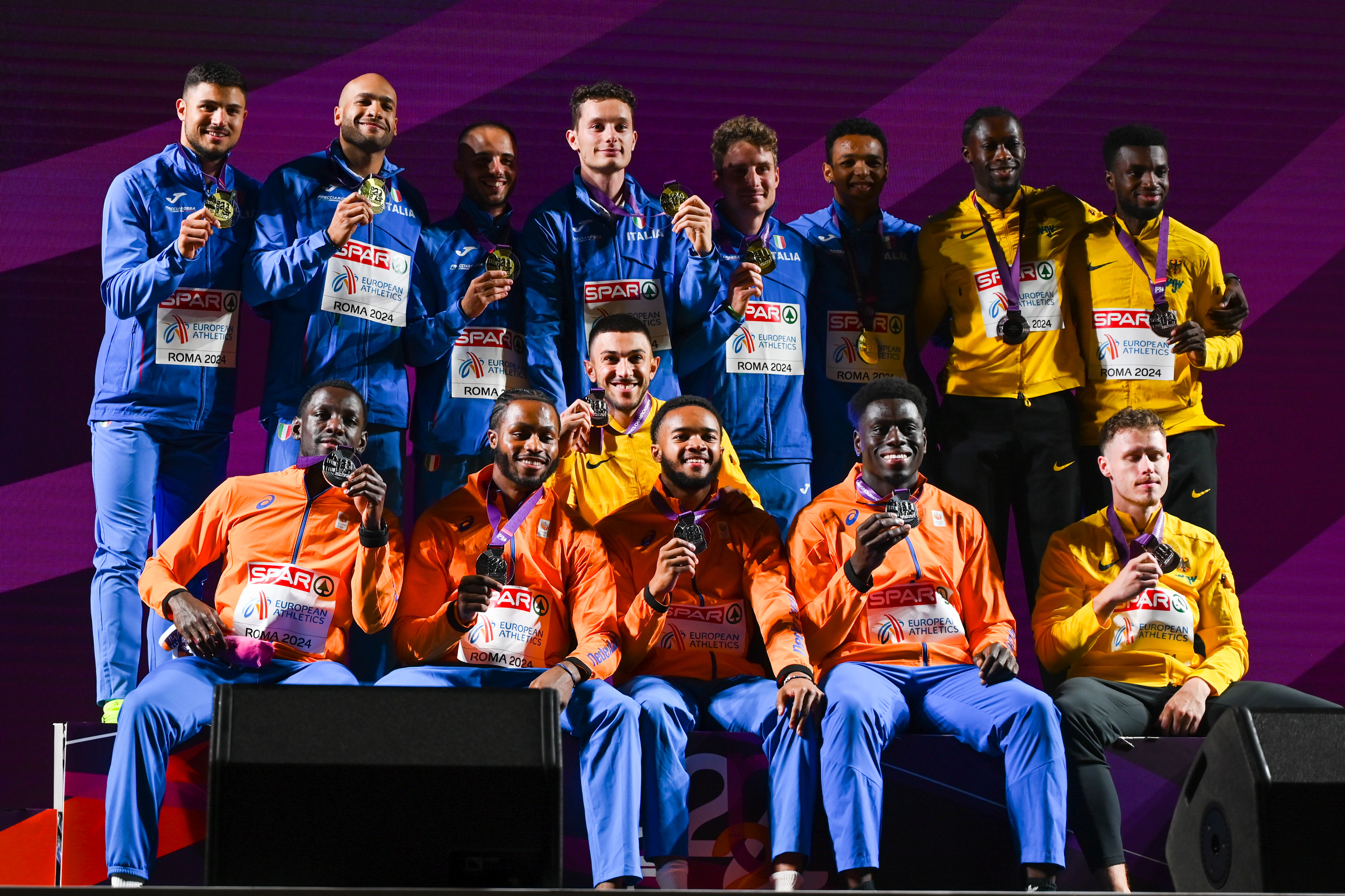
- The Podium
- Venue: Stadio Olimpico
- Location: Rome
- Dates: 11 June (heats); 12 June (final)
- Winning time: 37.82 EL

Medalists
| gold medal | Matteo Melluzzo; Marcell Jacobs; Lorenzo Patta; Filippo Tortu; Roberto Rigali*; Lorenzo Simonelli* | Italy |
| silver medal | Elvis Afrifa; Taymir Burnet; Xavi Mo-Ajok; Nsikak Ekpo | Netherlands |
| bronze medal | Kevin Kranz; Owen Ansah; Deniz Almas; Lucas Ansah-Peprah | Germany |

The men's 4 × 100 metres relay at the 2024 European Athletics Championships took place at the Stadio Olimpico on 11 and 12 June.

== Records ==
Standing records prior to the 2024 European Athletics Championships
| World record | Jamaica (Nesta Carter, Michael Frater; Yohan Blake, Usain Bolt) | 36.84 | London, Great Britain | 11 August 2012 |
| European record | Great Britain (Adam Gemili, Zharnel Hughes; Richard Kilty, Nethaneel Mitchell-Blake) | 37.36 | Doha, Qatar | 5 October 2019 |
| Championship record | Great Britain (Jeremiah Azu, Zharnel Hughes; Jona Efoloko, Nethaneel Mitchell-Blake) | 37.67 | Munich, Germany | 21 August 2022 |
| World Leading | United States (Courtney Lindsey, Kenneth Bednarek; Kyree King, Noah Lyles) | 37.40 | Nassau, Bahamas | 5 May 2024 |
| Europe Leading | Italy (Roberto Rigali, Lamont Marcell Jacobs; Lorenzo Patta, Filippo Tortu) | 38.14 | Nassau, Bahamas | 5 May 2024 |

== Schedule ==
| Date | Time | Round |
|---|---|---|
| 11 June 2024 | 12:00 | Round 1 |
| 12 June 2024 | 22:50 | Final |

All times are local times (UTC+2)

== Results ==
=== Round 1 ===
First 3 in each heat (Q) and 2 best performers (q) advance to the Final.

| Rank | Heat | Lane | Nation | Athletes | Time | Notes |
|---|---|---|---|---|---|---|
| 1 | 2 | 9 | Netherlands | Elvis Afrifa, Taymir Burnet, Xavi Mo-Ajok, Nsikak Ekpo | 38.34 | Q |
| 2 | 2 | 5 | Italy | Roberto Rigali, Matteo Melluzzo, Lorenzo Patta, Lorenzo Ndele Simonelli | 38.40 | Q |
| 3 | 1 | 5 | Germany | Kevin Kranz, Owen Ansah, Deniz Almas, Lucas Ansah-Peprah | 38.43 (.421) | Q, SB |
| 4 | 2 | 8 | France | Antoine Thoraval, Jeff Erius, Ryan Zeze, Aymeric Priam | 38.43 (.425) | Q |
| 5 | 1 | 9 | Belgium | Kobe Vleminckx, Ward Merckx, Antoine Snyders, Simon Verherstraeten | 38.55 | Q, NR |
| 6 | 1 | 7 | Poland | Marek Zakrzewski, Oliwer Wdowik, Łukasz Żak, Dominik Kopeć | 38.67 | Q, SB |
| 7 | 1 | 4 | Switzerland | Pascal Mancini, Felix Svensson, Bradley Lestrade, Timothé Mumenthaler | 38.70 | q |
| 8 | 1 | 2 | Denmark | Rasmus Thornbjerg Klausen, Emil Mader Kjær, Jacob Hvorup, Simon Hansen | 39.10 | q |
| 9 | 1 | 6 | Greece | Vasileios Myrianthopoulos, Nikolaos Panagiotopoulos, Sotirios Garaganis, Ioannis Nyfantopoulos | 39.13 | R, SB |
| 10 | 2 | 3 | Spain | Ricardo Sánchez, Abel Alejandro Jordan, Juan Carlos Castillo, Sergio López | 39.21 | SB |
| 11 | 2 | 7 | Czech Republic | Zdeněk Stromšík, Jan Veleba, Jan Jirka, Ondřej Macík | 39.22 | |
| 12 | 2 | 6 | Portugal | Carlos Nascimento, André Prazeres, Delvis Santos, Gabriel Maia | 39.26 | SB |
| 13 | 1 | 3 | Ireland | Toluwabori Akinola, Mark Smyth, Colin Doyle, Israel Olatunde | 39.34 | SB |
| 14 | 2 | 2 | Turkey | Kayhan Özer, Oğuz Uyar, Batuhan Altintaş, Mustafa Kemal Ay | 39.57 | |
| 15 | 1 | 8 | Great Britain | Chijindu Ujah, Jona Efoloko, Richard Kilty, Romell Glave | 39.60 | |
| | 2 | 4 | Slovenia | Jernej Gumilar, Matevž Šuštaršič, Andrej Skočir, Anej Čurin Prapotnik | DNF | |

=== Final ===
The final started on 12 June at 22:50.

| Rank | Lane | Nation | Athletes | Time | Notes |
|---|---|---|---|---|---|
| 1st place, gold medalist(s) | 8 | Italy | Matteo Melluzzo, Lamont Marcell Jacobs, Lorenzo Patta, Filippo Tortu | 37.82 | EL |
| 2nd place, silver medalist(s) | 7 | Netherlands | Elvis Afrifa, Taymir Burnet, Xavi Mo-Ajok, Nsikak Ekpo | 38.46 | |
| 3rd place, bronze medalist(s) | 5 | Germany | Kevin Kranz, Owen Ansah, Deniz Almas, Lucas Ansah-Peprah | 38.52 | |
| 4 | 6 | Belgium | Kobe Vleminckx, Ward Merckx, Antoine Snyders, Simon Verherstraeten | 38.65 | |
| 5 | 3 | Switzerland | Pascal Mancini, William Reais, Bradley Lestrade, Timothé Mumenthaler | 38.68 | |
| 6 | 2 | Denmark | Simon Hansen, Emil Mader Kjær, Jacob Hvorup, Frederik Schou-Nielsen | 39.21 | |
| 7 | 9 | Greece | Vasileios Myrianthopoulos, Nikolaos Panagiotopoulos, Sotirios Gkaragkanis, Ioannis Nyfantopoulos | 39.39 | |
| | 4 | Poland | Łukasz Żok, Marek Zakrzewski, Łukasz Żak, Dominik Kopeć | DNF | |
| | 9 | France | | DNS | |
