= 2025 European Athletics U23 Championships – Men's 4 × 100 metres relay =

Men's 4 × 100 metres relay at the 2025 European Athletics U23 Championships
- Venue: Fana Stadion
- Location: Bergen, Norway
- Dates: 20 July
- Competitors: 71 from 17 nations
- Winning time: 38.43 CR, EU23R

Medalists
gold medal	Maxime Rebierre; Yoran Kabengele Kabala; Mohammed Badru; Jeff Erius; Dejan Ottou	France
silver medal	Benedikt Thomas Wallstein; Jan Eric Frehe; Maurice Grahl; Heiko Gussmann	Germany
bronze medal	Manuel Vilacha; Abel Jordán; Juan Carlos Castillo; Marc Escandell; Jaime Sancho	Spain

The men's 4 × 100 metres relay event at the 2025 European Athletics U23 Championships was held in Bergen, Norway, at Fana Stadion on 20 July.

== Records ==
Prior to the competition, the records were as follows:

Record	Nation	Time (s)	Location	Date
European U23 record	Germany (GER)	38.70	Tallinn, Estonia	11 July 2021
Championship U23 record	Germany (GER)	38.70	Tallinn, Estonia	11 July 2021

== Results ==
=== Heats ===
First 2 in each heat (Q) and the next 2 fastest (q) advance to the final.

==== Heat 1 ====
Place	Nation	Athletes	Time	Notes
1	France	Maxime Rebierre, Yoran Kabengele Kabala, Mohammed Badru, Dejan Ottou	39.11	Q, SB
2	Netherlands	Jafrailyson Acton, Nsikak Ekpo, Timo Spiering, Matthew Sophia	39.49	Q, SB
3	Italy	Eduardo Longobardi, Andrea Bernardi, Filippo Cappelletti, Junior Tardioli	39.53	SB
4	Ukraine	Andrii Barabanov, Oleksandr Sosnovenko, Davyd Kulakovskyi, Volodymyr Kilko	40.05	SB
5	Czech Republic	Mikuláš Mutinský, Lukáš Soukal, Jindřich Stibral, Benjamin Jakob	40.08	
6	Norway	Emil Gundersen, Oliver Tollefsen, Sander Werge Nilsen, Kenny Emi Tijani-Ajayi	40.56	SB

==== Heat 2 ====
Place	Nation	Athletes	Time	Notes
1	Germany	Benedikt Thomas Wallstein, Jan Eric Frehe, Maurice Grahl, Heiko Gussmann	39.06	Q
2	Switzerland	Ramón Roppel, Joël Csontos, Mathieu Chèvre, Jonathan Gou Gomez	39.36	Q, NU23R
3	Belgium	Olivier Lifrange, Cédric Verschueren, Robbe Torfs, Timber Huysmans	39.42	q, NU23R
4	Poland	Hubert Kozelan, Rafał Rembisz, Dawid Grząka, Michał Gorzkowicz	39.63	SB
5	Ireland	Max O'Reilly, Craig Duffy, Darragh Murphy, Emmanuel Akinrolie	39.83	SB

==== Heat 3 ====
Place	Nation	Athletes	Time	Notes
1	Spain	Marc Escandell, Abel Jordán, Juan Carlos Castillo, Jaime Sancho	38.87	Q, =NU23R
2	Slovenia	Jernej Gumilar, Jurij Beber, Andrej Skočir, Anej Čurin Prapotnik	39.05	Q, NR
3	Finland	Topi Huttunen, Matias Ahtinen, Valtteri Louko, Rasmus Vehmaa	39.50	q, NU23R
4	Sweden	Isak Holgersson, Lucas Törnström, Jonatan Borg, Linus Pihl	39.55	NU23R
5	Austria	Vasily Klimov, Max Förster, Enzo Diessl, Felix Lang	39.63	NU23R
6	Turkey	Hüseyin Mutlu Korkmaz, Berkay Canbolat, Hasan Beyazel, Orçun Duran	39.97	NU23R

=== Final ===
Place	Nation	Athletes	Time	Notes
1st place, gold medalist(s)	Maxime Rebierre, Yoran Kabengele Kabala, Mohammed Badru, Jeff Erius	France	38.43	CR, EU23R
2nd place, silver medalist(s)	Benedikt Thomas Wallstein, Jan Eric Frehe, Maurice Grahl, Heiko Gussmann	Germany	38.80	SB
3rd place, bronze medalist(s)	Manuel Vilacha, Abel Jordán, Juan Carlos Castillo, Marc Escandell	Spain	38.86	NU23R
4	Jernej Gumilar, Jurij Beber, Andrej Skočir, Anej Čurin Prapotnik	Slovenia	38.99	NR
5	Jafrailyson Acton, Nsikak Ekpo, Timo Spiering, Matthew Sophia	Netherlands	39.17	SB
6	Topi Huttunen, Matias Ahtinen, Valtteri Louko, Rasmus Vehmaa	Finland	39.59	
7	Olivier Lifrange, Cédric Verschueren, Robbe Torfs, Rendel Vermeulen	Belgium	39.73	
—	Ramón Roppel, Joël Csontos, Mathieu Chèvre, Jonathan Gou Gomez	Switzerland	DNF	
