= Taymir Burnet =

Dutch sprinter (born 1992)

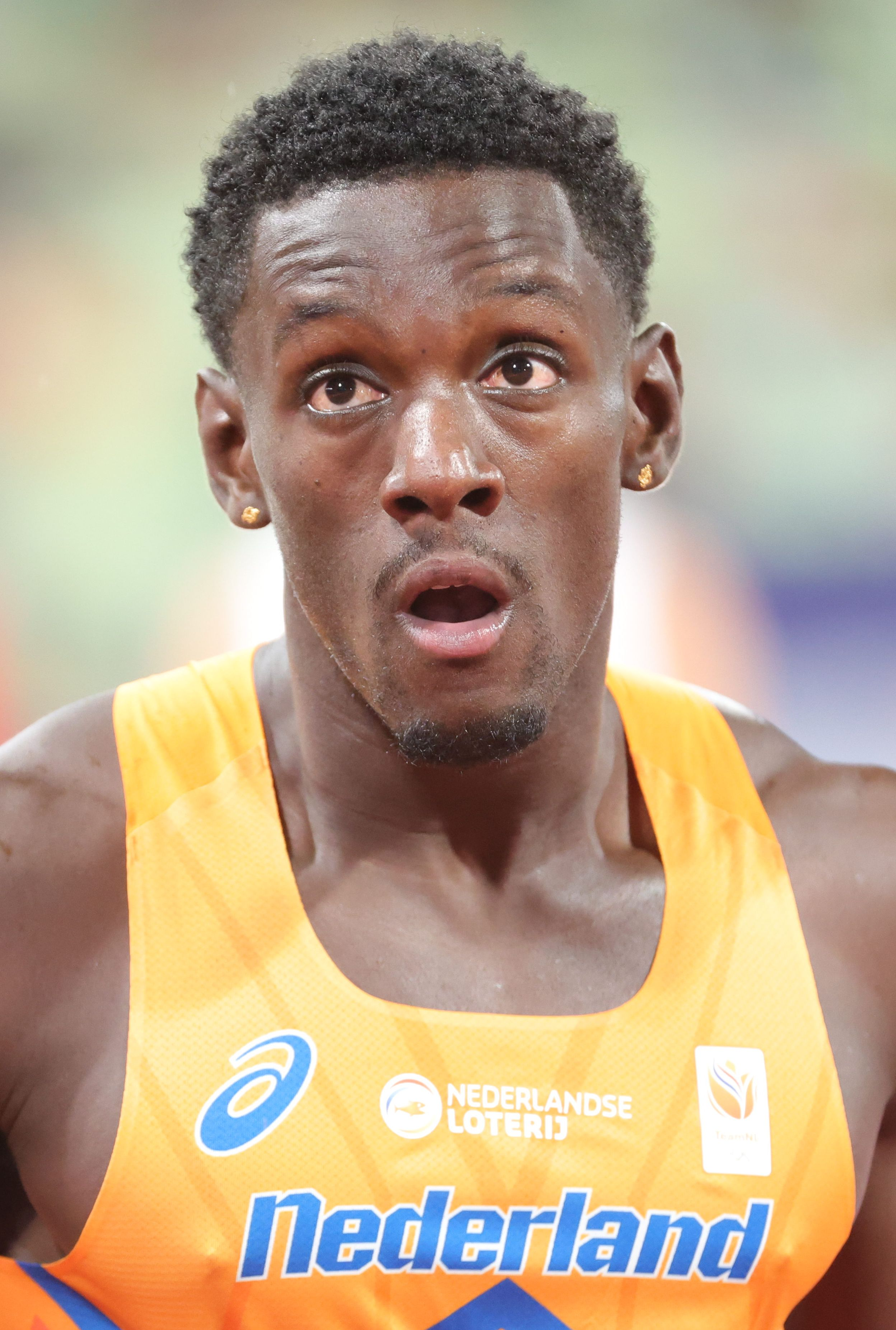
- Burnet at the 2022 European Athletics Championships in Munich

Personal information
- Born: 1 October 1992 (age 33) Willemstad, Curaçao, Netherlands Antilles

Sport
- Country: Netherlands
- Sport: Track and field
- Events: 60 metres, 100 metres, 200 metres
- Club: Rotterdam Atletiek

Achievements and titles
- Highest world ranking: No. 30 (200 m); No. 53 (100 m); No. 535 (overall)
- Personal bests: 60 m: 6.51 s i (2026, NR); 100 m: 10.09 s (2024); 150 m: 15.28 s (2024, NB); 200 m: 20.30 s (2024); 300 m: 32.29 s (2024); 400 m: 46.51 s i (2022)
Medal record
Men's athletics
Representing the Netherlands
World Championships
Bronze medal – third place	2025 Tokyo	4 × 100 m relay
World Indoor Championships
Bronze medal – third place	2022 Belgrade	4 × 400 m relay
European Championships
Silver medal – second place	2024 Rome	4 × 100 m relay
Bronze medal – third place	2018 Berlin	4 × 100 m relay

Taymir Burnet (born 1 October 1992) is a Dutch track and field athlete who competes in sprinting. He represented the Netherlands at multiple major championships including the 2020 and 2024 Olympic Games. He holds the Dutch record in the 60 metres with a time of 6.51 seconds set on 21 February 2026 and has a Dutch best performance in the 150 metres.

In relays, Burnet won bronze medals at the 2022 World Indoor Championships and the 2025 World Championships. He holds Dutch records in the 4 × 100 metres relay with a time of 37.81 seconds set on 21 September 2025 and 4 × 200 metres relay with a time of 1:20.86 minutes set on 4 September 2021.

== Career ==
He was a bronze medalist in the 4 × 100 metres relay at the 2018 European Athletics Championships in Berlin, Germany.

He won the Dutch national title over 200 metres at the Dutch Athletics Championships in August 2020. Burnet represented Netherlands at the 2020 Tokyo Olympics, competing in the 200 metres, reaching the semi-finals.

He was a bronze medalist in the men's 4 × 400 metres relay at the 2022 World Athletics Indoor Championships in Belgrade, Serbia. He ran at the 2022 European Athletics Championships in the 4 × 100 metres relay event finishing fourth. He competed in the 4 × 100 metres relay at the 2022 World Athletics Championships.

He finished fourth in the 200 metres at the 2023 European Athletics Team Championships. At the Championships, he also competed in the 4 × 100 metres relay. In 2023, he was selected for the 200 metres and also included with the Dutch relay pool for the 2023 World Athletics Championships in Budapest.

He ran in the semi-final for the Dutch 4 × 400 metres team that would go on and win the bronze medal at the 2024 World Athletics Indoor Championships in Glasgow, Scotland. He then ran as part of the Dutch 4 × 100 metres relay team at the 2024 World Relays Championships in Nassau, Bahamas in May 2024. He was a silver medalist at the 2024 European Athletics Championships in the 4 × 100 metres relay in Rome in June 2024. Later that month, he was runner-up in the 100 metres at the Dutch Athletics Championships. He competed in the men's 4 × 100 m relay at the 2024 Olympic Games.

In February 2025, he finished runner-up at the Dutch Indoor Athletics Championships over 60 metres. He finished eighth in the final of the 60 metres at the 2025 European Athletics Indoor Championships in Apeldoorn. He competed at the 2025 World Athletics Relays in China in the Men's 4 × 100 metres relay in May 2025. Alongside Xavi Mo-Ajok, Nsikak Ekpo and Elvis Afrifa he was part of the Dutch 4 × 100 metres team which set a new national record of 37.87 seconds to win the 2025 European Athletics Team Championships First Division in Madrid on 28 June.

In February 2026, he set a new Dutch national record in the 60 metres of 6.51 seconds, whilst competing in Apeldoorn. The following month, he reached the final of the 60 metres at the 2026 World Indoor Championships in Toruń, Poland having qualified after he tied in 6.56 seconds with Belgian Simon Verherstraeten in his semi-final. On 7 June, he equalled his 100 metres personal best with 10.09 seconds at the 2026 Bauhausgalan in Stockholm.

== Personal bests ==
Information from his World Athletics profile unless otherwise noted.

=== Individual events ===
Personal best times for individual events
Event		Time	Location	Date	Record	Notes
60 metres		6.51 i	Apeldoorn, Netherlands	21 February 2026	NR	
100 metres		9.98 w	La Chaux-de-Fonds, Switzerland	30 June 2019		Wind assistance: +3.5 m/s
100 metres		10.09	Potchefstroom, South Africa	14 February 2024		(Wind: +1.9 m/s)
150 metres		15.28	Willemstad, Curaçao	28 April 2024	NB	(Wind: -0.5 m/s)
200 metres	long track	20.07 w	La Chaux-de-Fonds, Switzerland	14 August 2021		Wind assistance: +2.1 m/s
200 metres	long track	20.30	Potchefstroom, South Africa	14 February 2024		(Wind: +0.0 m/s)
200 metres	short track	20.92 i	Ostrava, Czech Republic	3 February 2022		
300 metres		32.29	Pretoria, South Africa	17 February 2024		
400 metres	long track	47.60	Hengelo, Netherlands	6 June 2022		
400 metres	short track	46.51 i	Apeldoorn, Netherlands	26 February 2022		Burnet's outright 400 m best

=== Team events ===
Personal best times for team events
Event	Time	Location	Date	Record	Notes
4 × 100 metres relay	37.81	Tokyo, Japan	21 September 2025	NR	Teamed with Nsikak Ekpo, Xavi Mo-Ajok, and Elvis Afrifa. Burnet ran the second leg.
4 × 200 metres relay	1:20.86	Rotterdam, Netherlands	4 September 2021	NR	Teamed with Churandy Martina, Hensley Paulina, and Xavi Mo-Ajok. Burnet ran the first leg.
4 × 400 metres relay short track	3:06.47 i	Glasgow, United Kingdom	3 March 2024		Teamed with Isaya Klein Ikkink, Tony van Diepen, and Ramsey Angela. Brunet ran the first leg.

== Competition results ==
=== International competitions ===
Achievements in international competitions representing the Netherlands
Year	Competition	Location	Position	Event	Time	Notes
2017	World Championships	London, United Kingdom	11th (h)	4 × 100 m relay	38.66	
2018	European Championships	Berlin, Germany	21st (sf)	200 m	20.84	NR
2018	European Championships	Berlin, Germany	3rd	4 × 100 m relay	38.03	
2019	World Relays	Yokohama, Japan	10th (h)	4 × 100 m relay	38.67	
2019	World Championships	Doha, Qatar	17th (sf)	100 m	10.18	
2019	World Championships	Doha, Qatar	12th (sf)	200 m	20.34	PB
2019	World Championships	Doha, Qatar	–	4 × 100 m relay	DQ	
2021	World Relays	Chorzów, Poland	–	4 × 100 m relay	DNF	
2021	Olympic Games	Tokyo, Japan	22nd (sf)	200 m	20.90	
2021	Olympic Games	Tokyo, Japan	–	4 × 100 m relay	DNF	
2022	World Indoor Championships	Belgrade, Serbia	3rd	4 × 400 m relay	3:06.90	
2022	World Championships	Eugene, United States	13th (h)	4 × 100 m relay	39.07	
2022	European Championships	Munich, Germany	10th (sf)	200 m	20.44	
2022	European Championships	Munich, Germany	4th	4 × 100 m relay	38.25	
2023	World Championships	Budapest, Hungary	19th (sf)	200 m	20.65	
2023	World Championships	Budapest, Hungary	–	4 × 100 m relay	DNF	
2024	World Indoor Championships	Glasgow, United Kingdom	3rd (h)	4 × 400 m relay	3:06.47	NR
2024	European Championships	Rome, Italy	16th (sf)	100 m	10.33	
2024	European Championships	Rome, Italy	23rd (sf)	200 m	21.02	
2024	European Championships	Rome, Italy	2nd	4 × 100 m relay	38.46	
2024	Olympic Games	Paris, France	12th (h)	4 × 100 m relay	38.48	
2025	European Indoor Championships	Apeldoorn, Netherlands	8th	60 m	6.66	
2025	World Championships	Tokyo, Japan	26th (h)	100 m	10.21	
2025	World Championships	Tokyo, Japan	3rd	4 × 100 m relay	37.81	NR
2026	World Indoor Championships	Toruń, Poland	6th	60 m	6.61	
2026	European Championships	Birmingham, United Kingdom	23rd (h)	100 m	10.55	
