= John Otugade =

British sprinter (born 1995)

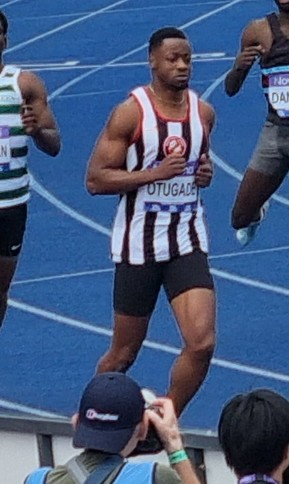
- 2025 UK Athletics Championships

Personal information
- Nationality: British
- Born: 24 January 1995 (age 31)

Sport
- Sport: Athletics
- Events: 60, 100m, 200m

Achievements and titles
- Personal bests: 60m: 6.60 (Lee Valley, 2021); 100m: 10.18 (Clermont, 2024); 200m: 21.13 (Lee Valley, 2017)

John Otugade (born 24 January 1995) is a British sprinter. He was runner-up over 60 metres at the 2025 British Indoor Athletics Championships and was a semi-finalist at the 2025 European Athletics Indoor Championships.

== Biography ==
Otugade is a member of the Shaftesbury Harriers. He equalled his personal best of 6.60 seconds for the 60 metres whilst competing in January 2025. He finished second at the 2025 British Indoor Athletics Championships in Birmingham over 60 metres in February 2025, running 6.64 seconds. He was subsequently selected for the British team for the 2025 European Athletics Indoor Championships in Apeldoorn. Competing at the Championships on his senior international debut, he qualified for the semi-finals of the 60 metres with a run of 6.63 seconds. He finished fifth in his semi-final in a time of 6.77 seconds.

On 2 August, Otugade qualified for the finals of the 100 metres at the 2025 UK Athletics Championships in Birmingham, placing eighth overall.

== Personal life ==
From London, he attended Queen Elizabeth School in Barnet. He studied law at the University College London. He combines his athletics career with full-time work, and worked in investment banking, and as a paralegal, prior to becoming a solicitor. He is of Nigerian descent.
