= Abel Jordán =

Spanish sprinter (born 2003)

Personal information
- Full name: Abel Alejandro Jordán
- Nationality: Spanish
- Born: 18 September 2003 (age 22)

Sport
- Sport: Athletics
- Events: Sprint, Hurdles

Achievements and titles
- Personal bests: 60m: 6.54 (2025) NU23R; 100m 10.18 (2024); 60m hurdles: 7.59 (2025); 100m hurdles: 13.55 (2024)
Medal record
Men's athletics
Representing Spain
European U23 Championships
Bronze medal – third place	2025 Bergen	100m
Bronze medal – third place	2025 Bergen	4x100 m relay

Abel Alejandro Jordán (born 18 September 2003) is a Spanish sprinter and hurdler. He won the Spanish Indoor Athletics Championships over 60 metres in 2025.

== Early and personal life ==
His parents emigrated to Spain from Cuba in 2002. He was born in Vigo a year later, but moved with his parents at the age of five months-old to Madrid. He was named after two of his father's best friends, Abel and Alejandro. He studied Mechanical Engineering in the United States at California State University, Fullerton.

== Career ==
=== 2024 ===
After suffering injuries in 2023, he moved away from competing in hurdles to focus on sprints at the start of 2024. In the 2024 winter season competing in the United States, he broke the Spanish under-23 record for the 60 metres with a time of 6.59 seconds, the fourth fastest Spanish athlete in history. In May 2024 he ran a personal best 10.19 seconds for the 100 metres. He competed in the 4 × 100 m relay at the 2024 European Athletics Championships in Rome in June 2024. The following month, in July 2024, he ran a new personal best time of 10.18 seconds to win the Spanish U23 Championships over 100 metres, in Burgos.

=== 2025 ===
He won the Spanish men's 60m title at the Spanish Indoor Athletics Championships, in a personal best time of 6.54 seconds, on 22 February 2025, also a Spanish under-23 record. At the same championship on the same day, he also qualified second fastest for the 60m hurdles final with a time of 7.63 seconds, placing second in the final behind Enrique Llopis. He competed at the 2025 European Athletics Indoor Championships in Apeldoorn, Netherlands in both the 60 metres and 60 metres hurdles competitions. he reached the final of the 60 metres hurdles competition, placing fourth overall in a time of 7.54 seconds. He was also a semi-finalist in the men’s 60 metres.

In July 2025, he retained his 100 metres title at the outdoor Spanish U23 Championships in Badajoz. He won the bronze medal in the 100 metres race at the 2025 European Athletics U23 Championships, running a time of 10.31 seconds into a headwind (-2.0 m/s). Later in the championships, he ran as part of the Spanish men's 4 x 100 metres relay team that won the bronze medal.

=== 2026 ===
Competing in the United States, he qualified for the 2026 NCAA Outdoor Championships in June 2026 over 100 metres. He competed in the 100 metres at the 2026 European Athletics Championships in Birmingham, England in August 2026. He also ran in the men's 4 x 100 metres relay at the championships.

== International competitions ==
Year	Competition	Venue	Position	Event	Notes
Representing Spain
2021	European U20 Championships	Tallinn, Estonia	6th (h)	110 m hurdles (0,99m)	13.88
2024	European Championships	Rome, Italy	10th (h)	4 × 100 m relay	39.21
2025	European Indoor Championships	Apeldoorn, Netherlands	4th	60 m hurdles i	7.54
2025	European Indoor Championships	Apeldoorn, Netherlands	21st (sf)	60 m i	6.68
2025	European U23 Championships	Bergen, Norway	3rd	100 m	10.31
2025	European U23 Championships	Bergen, Norway	3rd	4 × 100 m relay	38.86
2026	European Championships	Birmingham, United Kingdom	14th (h)	100 m	10.58
2026	European Championships	Birmingham, United Kingdom	–	4 × 100 m relay	DNF
