= 2023 Italian Athletics Indoor Championships =

- Dates: 18-19 February
- Host city: Ancona
- Venue: Palaindoor di Ancona
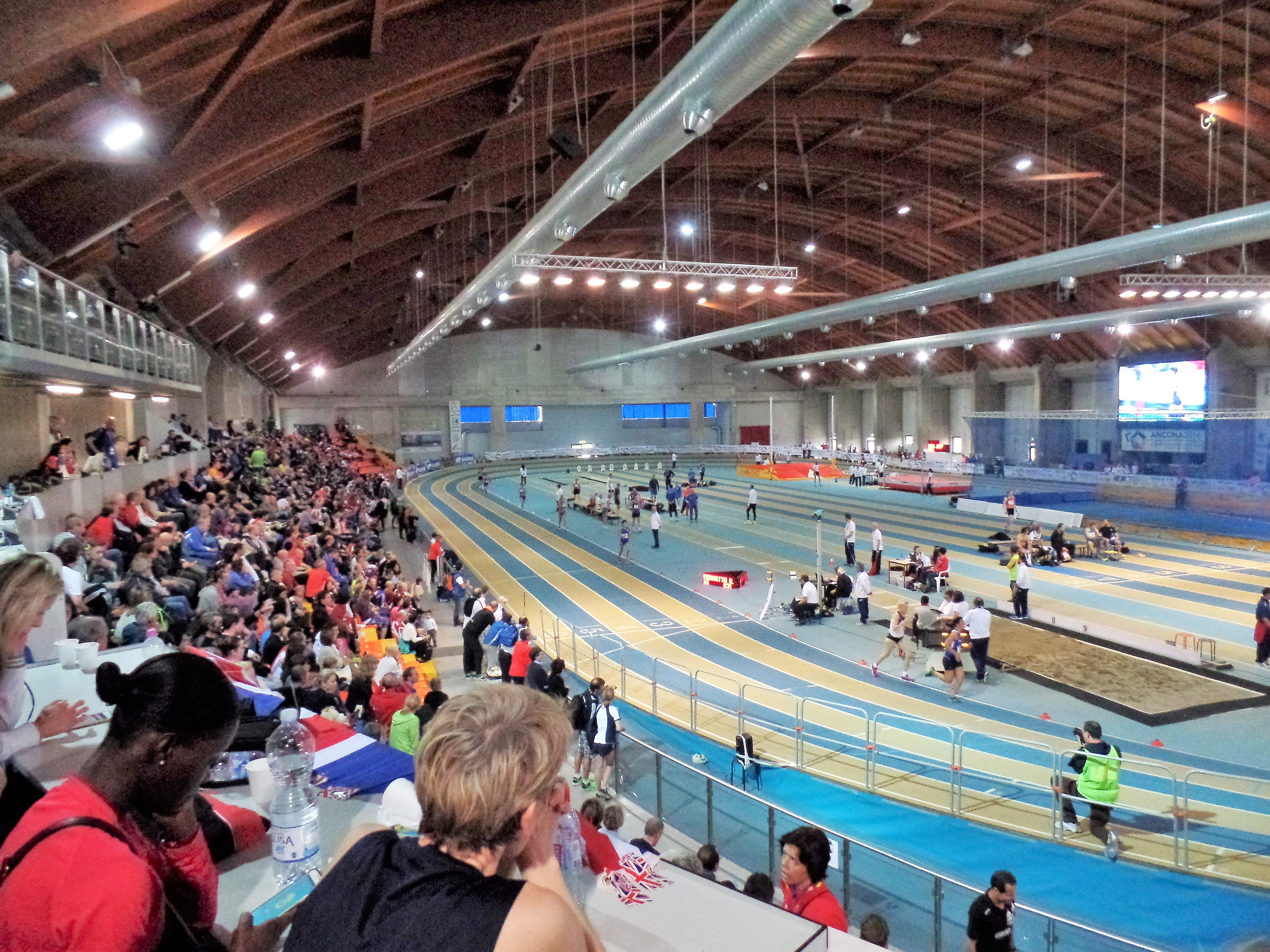
- Level: Senior
- Events: 28

2023 Italian Athletics Indoor Championships is the 54th edition of the Italian Athletics Indoor Championships held in Ancona.

== Champions ==
Event	Men	Performance	Women	Performance
60 m	Samuele Ceccarelli	6.54 PB	Gloria Hooper	7.31 SB
400 m	Riccardo Meli	46.58	Ayomide Folorunso	52.28 PB
800 m	Catalin Tecuceanu	1:45.99 PB	Eloisa Coiro	2:03.55
1500 m	Pietro Arese	3:48.07	Ludovica Cavalli	4:08.00 PB
3000 m	Ossama Meslek	7:52.90	Ludovica Cavalli	9:14.25
Relay 4x2 rounds	CUS Pro Patria Milano; Francesco Rossi; Andrea Blesio; Luca Sito; Andrea Panassidi	3:13.40	CUS Pro Patria Milano; Ilaria Burattin; Serena Troiani; Alexandra Troiani; Virginia Troiani	3:39.84
60 m hs	Lorenzo Simonelli	7.66 U23NR	Nicla Mosetti	8.04 PB
5000/3000 m race walk	Francesco Fortunato	18:37.63 PB	Alexandrina Mihai	12:51.73 PB
High jump	Stefano Sottile	2.26 m	Elena Vallortigara	1.90 m
Pole vault	Matteo Oliveri	5.43 m	Roberta Bruni	4.62 m NR
Long jump	Filippo Randazzo	7.68 m	Larissa Iapichino	6.53 m
Triple jump	Tobia Bocchi	16.83 m SB	Dariya Derkach	14.12 m
Shot put	Leonardo Fabbri	21.60 m PB	Monia Cantarella	15.96 m PB
Combined events (heptahlon/pentathlon)	Lorenzo Naidon	5714 pts SB	Sveva Gerevini	4411 pts SB

Note:

- Full results.

== See also ==
- 2023 Italian Athletics Championships
