= Joshua Hartmann =

German sprinter (born 1999)

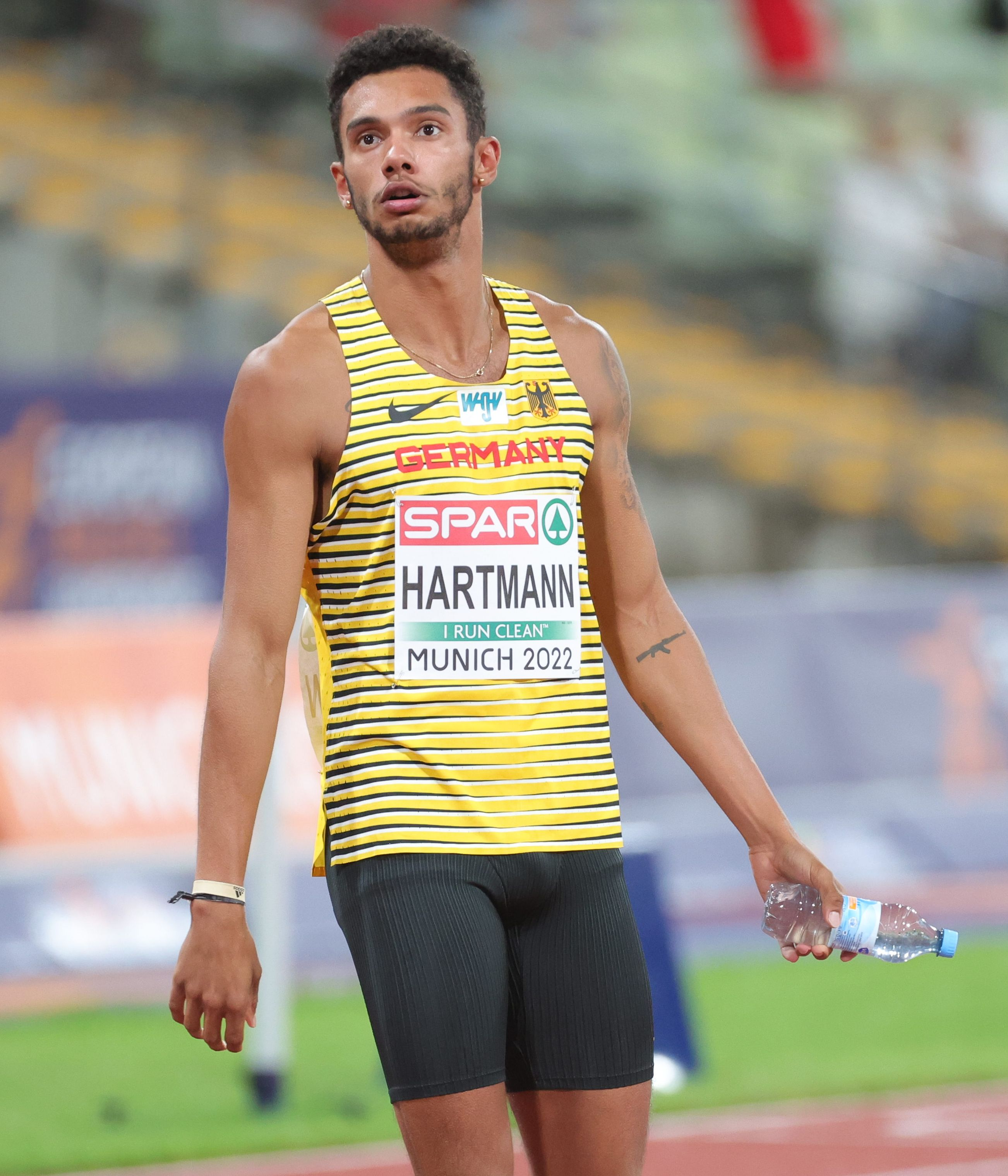
- Hartmann in 2022

Personal information
- Nationality: German
- Born: 9 June 1999 (age 27) Siegen, Germany
- Height: 1.87 m (6 ft 2 in)

Sport
- Sport: Athletics
- Events: Sprints; Relays
- Club: ASV Köln
- Coached by: Jannik Engel

Achievements and titles
- Personal bests: Outdoor; 100 m: 10.06 (2024); 200 m: 20.02 NR (2023); Indoor; 60 m: 6.53 (2023)
Medal record
Men's athletics
Representing Germany
European Games
Gold medal – first place	2023 Kraków-Małopolska	4 × 100 m relay

Joshua Hartmann (born 9 June 1999) is a German track and field athlete specializing in sprint events. He competed in the men's 4 × 100 metres relay event at the 2020 Summer Olympics.

== Career ==
In July 2021, Hartmann represented Germany at the 2021 European Athletics U23 Championships in the men's 4 × 100 metres relay where he won a gold medal and set the European under-23 record in the event with a time of 38.70.

== Personal life ==
Hartmann was born in Siegen, Germany to a US-American father and German mother.
