= Allan Lagui =

French athlete (born 1999)

Personal information
- Born: 21 September 1999 (age 27) Rosny-sous-Bois, France
- Height: 183 cm (6 ft 0 in)
- Weight: 79 kg (174 lb)

Sport
- Country: France
- Sport: Athletics
- Events: Sprints; Relays
- Coached by: Richard Cursaz

Achievements and titles
- Personal bests: Outdoor; 100 m: 10.25 (Cergy-Pontoise, 2023); 200 m: 21.35 (Cergy-Pontoise, 2024); Indoor; 60 m: 6.58 (Miramas, 2025)

Allan Lagui (born 21 September 1999) is a French sprinter. He represented France over 60 metres at the 2025 European Athletics Indoor Championships.

== Career ==
He is a member of Cergy-Pontoise Athlétisme in the Val-d'Oise and Yvelines departments. He finished third in the 60 metres at the French Indoor Athletics Championships, in Miramas in 2024. He was a member of the France squad that travelled for the 2024 World Athletics Relays.

He led the French 60 metres rankings in the winter of 2025. In February 2025, he set a new personal best over 60 metres of 6.58 seconds in the heats of the French Indoor Athletics Championships in Miramas, where he went on to place second overall. He was subsequently selected for the 2025 European Athletics Indoor Championships in Appeldoorn, where he qualified for the semi-finals after winning his qualifying heat in 6.59 seconds. On 10 April 2025, he was provisionally named in the French team for the 2025 World Athletics Relays in Guangzhou, China in May 2025.
