= Xavi Mo-Ajok =

Dutch athlete (born 2002)

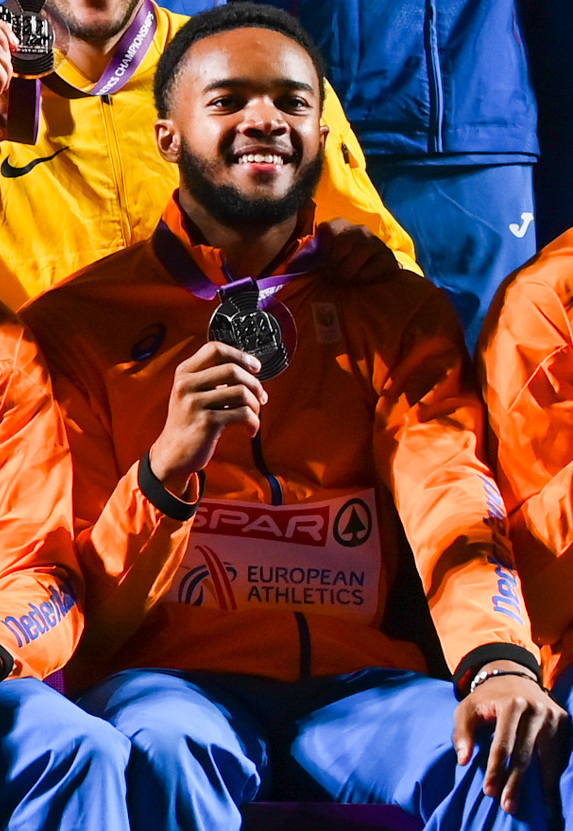
- Xavi Mo-Ajok in 2024

Personal information
- Nationality: Dutch
- Born: 16 September 2002 (age 23)

Sport
- Sport: Athletics
- Event: Sprint

Achievements and titles
- Personal bests: 60 m: 6.69 (Apeldoorn, 2024); 100 m: 10.09 (Hengelo, 2025); 200 m: 20.01 (Madrid, 2025)
Medal record
Men's athletics
Representing Netherlands
World Championships
Bronze medal – third place	2025 Tokyo	4 × 100 m relay
European Championships
Silver medal – second place	2024 Rome	4 × 100 m relay
European U20 Championships
Silver medal – second place	2021 Tallinn	4 × 100 m relay

Xavi Mo-Ajok (born 16 September 2002) is a Dutch sprinter. He has won Dutch national indoor titles over 60 metres and 200 metres. He won silver at the 2024 European Athletics Championships in the men's 4 × 100 metres relay. He was also a silver medalist in the men's 4 × 100 metres relay at the 2021 European Athletics U20 Championships.

== Career ==
He was a silver medalist at the 2021 European Athletics U20 Championships in Tallinn, Estonia, in the 4 × 100 metres relay. In 2022, he won the Dutch Indoor Athletics Championships over 200 metres in Apeldoorn.

He represented the Netherlands at the 2023 European Athletics Team Championships in the 4 × 100 metres relay in June 2023 in Silesia, Poland. In July 2023, he reached the final of the 200 metres at the 2023 European Athletics U23 Championships in Espoo, Finland, placing eighth overall. In August 2023, he was also included with the Dutch relay pool for the 2023 World Athletics Championships in Budapest.

In February 2024, he won the Dutch Indoor Athletics Championships over 60 metres in Apeldoorn. He ran as part of the Dutch 4 × 100 m relay team at the 2024 World Relays Championships in Nassau, Bahamas in May 2024.

He was a silver medalist at the 2024 European Athletics Championships in the 4 × 100 metres relay in Rome, Italy, in June 2024.

He competed at the 2025 World Athletics Relays in China in the Men's 4 × 100 metres relay in May 2025. He ran a personal best of 10.09 seconds for the 100 metres in Hengelo on 9 June 2025. Alongside Taymir Burnet, Nsikak Ekpo and Elvis Afrifa he was part of the Dutch 4 × 100 metres team which set a new national record of 37.87 seconds to win the 2025 European Athletics Team Championships First Division in Madrid on 28 June. The following day, he won the 200 metres at the event, lowering his personal best to 20.01 seconds (1.8m/s). He finished fifth over 200 metres in the 2025 Diamond League event in Monaco at the 2025 Herculis.

In September 2025, he was a semi-finalist in the 200 metres at the 2025 World Championships in Tokyo, Japan. He also ran in the men's 4 × 100 metres relay at the championships, winning the bronze medal with the Dutch team.

In August 2026, he competed for the Netherlands at the 2026 European Athletics Championships in Birmingham, England.

== Personal life ==
He is from Hoogvliet, near Rotterdam. His father is Surinamese; his mother was born in Cabo Verde. He competed as a judoka before concentrating on sprinting.
