= Hristo Iliev (sprinter) =

Bulgarian sprinter (born 2005)

Personal information
- Born: 3 January 2005 (age 21)

Sport
- Sport: Athletics
- Event: Sprint

Achievements and titles
- Personal bests: 60m: 6.51 (2026) NR AU23R; 100m: 10.29 (2025); 200m: 21.08 (2025)
Medal record
Men's athletics
Representing Bulgaria
Balkan Championships
Bronze medal – third place	2025 Volos	100m
Balkan Indoor Championships
Gold medal – first place	2026 Belgrade	60m

Hristo Iliev (born 3 January 2005) is a Bulgarian sprinter. He is a multiple-time national champion over 100 metres. Competing over 60 metres, he won the Balkan Indoor Championships in 2026, setting a new Bulgarian national record and European U23 record.

== Biography ==
Iliev is coached by the renowned Bulgarian trainer Valya Demireva. He won the Bulgarian Athletics Championships over 100 metres in June 2024. That year, he was a semi-finalist over 100 metres and 200 metres at the 2024 World Athletics U20 Championships in Lima, Peru.

He competed at the 2025 European Athletics Indoor Championships in Apeldoorn, Netherlands, in March 2025, without advancing to the semi-finals. In July 2025, he was a semi-finalist at the 2025 European Athletics U23 Championships in Bergen, Norway over 100 metres. That month, he placed third in the 100 metres at the 2025 Balkan Athletics Championships in Volos. He retained his 100 metres title at the Bulgarian Championships in August 2025.

In February 2026, he set a Bulgarian national record in the 60 metres with a time of 6.54 seconds at the Belgrade Indoor Meeting, part of the World Athletics Indoor Tour, improving the long-standing national record set by Petar Petrov in 1978 by four hundredths of a seconds and going below the automatic standard for the upcoming Indoor World Championships. Later that month, on the same track in Belgrade, he won the 60 metres title at the Balkan Athletics Indoor Championships with a new national record time of 6.53 seconds, which also set a new European under-23 record, and broke the championship record of Aggelos Pavlakakis from 2000.

Competing at the Bulgarian Indoor Championships in Sofia on 1 March 2026, he lowered his national record for the 60 metres to 6.51 seconds to tie the European lead for the event and finish ahead of defending champion Nikola Karamanolov. He was subsequently selected for the 2026 World Athletics Indoor Championships in Toruń, Poland, running 6.63 seconds without advancing to the semi-finals. He competed in the 100 metres at the 2026 European Athletics Championships in Birmingham, England in August 2026.
