= Heiko Gussmann =

German sprinter

Personal information
- Born: 11 March 2004 (age 22)

Sport
- Sport: Athletics
- Event: Sprint
Medal record
Men's athletics
Representing Germany
European Championships
Silver medal – second place	2026 Birmingham	4 × 100 m relay
Silver medal – second place	2026 Birmingham	4 × 100 m mixed
European U23 Championships
Silver medal – second place	2025 Bergen	4 × 100 m relay
European U20 Championships
Bronze medal – third place	2023 Jerusalem	4 × 100 m relay

Heiko Gussmann (born 11 March 2004) is a German sprinter.

== Biography ==
A member of SCL Heel Baden-Baden, in June 2023 Gussmann moved tu the top of the European 100 metres U20 rankings with a time of 10.34 seconds in Regensburg. Gussmann won the bronze medal in the 4 × 100 metres relay at the 2023 European Athletics U20 Championships in Jerusalem, Israel.

In January 2025, Gussmann set a personal best of 6.58 seconds for the 60 metres at the Hessian Indoor Championships in Frankfurt. The following month, he lowered it and twice equalled the European U23 men's 60 m record of 6.57 in the heats and final in Berlin at the ISTAF Indoor, winning the event ahead of Akani Simbine.

Having lowered his 100 m personal best to 10.15 seconds in 2025, Gussmann placed fourth overall in the individual 100 metres and later won the silver medal in the 4 × 100 metres relay alongside Benedikt Wallstein, Jan Eric Frehe and Maurice Grahl at the 2025 European Athletics U23 Championships in Bergen, Norway.

Gussmann ran in the mixed 4 × 100 metres relay at the 2026 World Athletics Relays in Gaborone, Botswana, competing alongside Sophia Junk, Sina Kammerschmitt and Yannick Wolf on the opening day with their finishing time of 40.15 seconds setting a European record. The following day, he raced as the German team placed fourth overall. Competing at the 2026 European Athletics Championships in Birmingham, England in August 2026, he was a semi-finalist in the 100 metres. He also won a silver medal in the men's 4 × 100 metres relay at the championships, before returning to the track on the final evening of the championships to win a silver medal in the mixed 4 × 100 metres relay.
