= 2025 World Athletics Relays – Men's 4 × 100 metres relay =

Men's 4 × 100 metres relay at the 2025 World Athletics Relays
- Venue: Tianhe Stadium, Guangzhou
- Dates: 10 May (heats); 11 May (repechage round & final)
- Winning time: 37.61

Medalists
| gold medal | Bayanda Walaza; Sinesipho Dambile; Bradley Nkoana; Akani Simbine | South Africa |
| silver medal | Courtney Lindsey; Kenny Bednarek; Kyree King; Brandon Hicklin | United States |
| bronze medal | Aaron Brown; Jerome Blake; Brendon Rodney; Andre De Grasse | Canada |

The men's 4 × 100 metres relay at the 2025 World Athletics Relays was held at the Tianhe Stadium in Guangzhou, China on 10 and 11 May.

The event served as a qualifying event for the 2025 World Athletics Championships, with the top 14 teams securing qualification to the World Championships.

== Records ==
Prior to the competition, the records were as follows:

| Record | Team | Time | Location | Date |
|---|---|---|---|---|
| World record | Jamaica (Nesta Carter, Michael Frater, Yohan Blake, Usain Bolt) | 36.84 | London, United Kingdom | 11 August 2012 |
| Championships record | United States (Mike Rodgers, Justin Gatlin, Tyson Gay, Ryan Bailey) | 37.38 | (The Bahamas) Nassau, Bahamas | 2 May 2015 |
| 2025 World Leading | Australia Gold (Lachlan Kennedy, Joshua Azzopardi, Christopher Ius, Calab Law) | 37.87 | Sydney, Australia | 15 March 2025 |

== Qualification ==
On 10 November 2024, World Athletics announced the qualification system for the championships. The top 16 teams in each event at the 2024 Summer Olympic Games qualify for entry to the championships. The host country China will enter with one team in each event, regardless of any entry conditions. The remaining teams (up to 32 in total per event) will be determined through the top lists in the qualification period (1 January 2024 to 13 April 2025).

== Program ==
All times are local (UTC+8).

| Date | Time | Round |
|---|---|---|
| 10 May 2025 | 20:25 | Heats |
| 11 May 2025 | 20:32 | Repechage round |
| 11 May 2025 | 21:26 | Final |

== Results ==
=== Heats (World Championships Qualifying Round 1) ===
The heats were held on 10 May 2025, starting at 20:25 (UTC+8) in the evening. Qualification: First 2 of each heat qualify to the 2025 World Athletics Championships (WQ) and World Athletics Relays Final. All teams that do not qualify move on the repechage round, where they get a second chance to qualify for the World Championships.

==== Heat 1 ====
| Rank | Lane | Nation | Competitors | Time | Notes |
|---|---|---|---|---|---|
| 1 | 6 | Great Britain | Romell Glave, Nethaneel Mitchell-Blake, Jona Efoloko, Eugene Amo-Dadzie | 38.18 | WQ, SB |
| 2 | 9 | Poland | Patryk Krupa, Oliwer Wdowik, Łukasz Żak, Dominik Kopeć | 38.43 | WQ, SB |
| 3 | 8 | Ghana | Barnabas Aggerh, Joseph Amoah, Sean Safo-Antwi, Ibrahim Fuseini | 38.49 | SB |
| 4 | 4 | South Korea | Seo Minjun, Nwamadi Joeljin, Lee Jae-seong, Ko Seung-hwan | 38.56 | NR |
| 5 | 7 | France | Pablo Matéo, Jeff Erius, Ryan Zeze, Aymeric Priam | 38.62 | SB |
| 6 | 5 | Colombia | Jhonny Rentería, Carlos Palacios, Neiker Abello, Carlos Flórez | 38.75 | |

==== Heat 2 ====
| Rank | Lane | Nation | Competitors | Time | Notes |
|---|---|---|---|---|---|
| 1 | 6 | South Africa | Bayanda Walaza, Sinesipho Dambile, Bradley Nkoana, Akani Simbine | 37.84 | WQ, WL |
| 2 | 8 | Germany | Kevin Kranz, Owen Ansah, Yannik Wolf, Lucas Ansah-Peprah | 38.33 | WQ, SB |
| 3 | 5 | Kenya | Boniface Mweresa, Ferdinand Omanyala, Meshack Kitsubuli Babu, Steve Onyango Odhiambo | 38.35 | NR |
| 4 | 3 | Chinese Taipei | Lai Po-Hsiang, Chen Wen-Pu, Huang Tso-Chun, Wei Tai-sheng | 39.00 | SB |
| 5 | 4 | Thailand | Natawat Iamudom, Soraoat Dapbang, Chayut Khongprasit, Puripol Boonson | 39.18 | SB |
| | 7 | Jamaica | Rohan Watson, Julian Forte, Yohan Blake, Kishane Thompson | DNF | |
| | 9 | Belgium | Jordan Paquot, Antoine Snyders, Kobe Vleminckx, Simon Verherstraeten | DQ | TR24.7[L] |

==== Heat 3 ====
| Rank | Lane | Nation | Competitors | Time | Notes |
|---|---|---|---|---|---|
| 1 | 7 | Japan | Abdul Hakim Sani Brown, Rai Atago, Towa Uzawa, Naoki Inoue | 37.84 | WQ, =WL |
| 2 | 5 | Canada | Aaron Brown, Jerome Blake, Brendon Rodney, Andre De Grasse | 38.15 | WQ |
| 3 | 8 | Netherlands | Onyema Adigida, Taymir Burnet, Xavi Mo-Ajok, Elvis Afrifa | 38.20 | SB |
| 4 | 6 | Australia | Lachlan Kennedy, Joshua Azzopardi, Christopher Ius, Prince Jackson | 38.33 | |
| 5 | 4 | Switzerland | Daryl Bachmann, Timothé Mumenthaler, Bradley Lestrade, Jonathan Gou Gomez | 38.95 | SB |
| 6 | 9 | Denmark | Valentin Jensen, Kojo Musah, Simon Hansen, Frederik Schou-Nielsen | 39.08 | SB |

==== Heat 4 ====
| Rank | Lane | Nation | Competitors | Time | Notes |
|---|---|---|---|---|---|
| 1 | 7 | United States | Courtney Lindsey, Kenny Bednarek, Kyree King, Brandon Hicklin | 37.86 | WQ, SB |
| 2 | 8 | Italy | Fausto Desalu, Matteo Melluzzo, Lorenzo Patta, Filippo Tortu | 38.16 | WQ, SB |
| 3 | 6 | China | Xie Zhenye, Zeng Keli, Wang Shengjie, Chen Jiapeng | 38.30 | SB |
| 4 | 9 | Brazil | Vinícius Moraes, Vitor Hugo dos Santos, Erik Cardoso, Felipe Bardi | 38.40 | SB |
| 5 | 5 | Botswana | Karabo Mothibi, Larona Mayana, Godiraone Kevin Lobatlamang, Tumo van Wyk | 38.49 | NR |
| 6 | 3 | Paraguay | Jonathan Wolk, Misael Zalazar, Fredy Maidana, César Almirón | 39.53 | SB |
| 7 | 4 | Spain | Alejandro Rueda, Juan Carlos Castillo, Adria Alfonso, Ricardo Sánchez | 39.66 | SB |

=== Repechage Round (World Championships Qualifying Round 2) ===
The repechage round was held on 11 May 2025, starting at 20:32 (UTC+8) in the evening. The repechage round consisted of all countries which did not qualify for the final. Qualification: First 2 of each heat qualify to the 2025 World Athletics Championships (WQ).

==== Heat 1 ====
| Rank | Lane | Nation | Competitors | Time | Notes |
|---|---|---|---|---|---|
| 1 | 6 | France | Pablo Matéo, Jeff Erius, Ryan Zeze, Aymeric Priam | 38.31 | WQ, SB |
| 2 | 7 | Ghana | Barnabas Aggerh, Joseph Amoah, Mustapha Bokpin, Ibrahim Fuseini | 38.32 | WQ, SB |
| 3 | 9 | South Korea | Seo Minjun, Nwamadi Joeljin, Lee Jae-seong, Lee Jun-hyeok | 38.51 | NR |
| 4 | 4 | Chinese Taipei | Lai Po-Hsiang, Chen Wen-Pu, Huang Tso-Chun, Wei Tai-sheng | 38.96 | SB |
| | 5 | Netherlands | Onyema Adigida, Taymir Burnet, Xavi Mo-Ajok, Elvis Afrifa | DNF | |
| | 8 | Switzerland | Jonathan Gou Gomez, Timothé Mumenthaler, Bradley Lestrade, Daryl Bachmann | DNF | |

==== Heat 2 ====
| Rank | Lane | Nation | Competitors | Time | Notes |
|---|---|---|---|---|---|
| 1 | 6 | Belgium | Robin Vanderbemden, Antoine Snyders, Kobe Vleminckx, Simon Verherstraeten | 38.49 | WQ, NR |
| 2 | 8 | Kenya | Boniface Mweresa, Ferdinand Omanyala, Meshack Kitsubuli Babu, Steve Onyango Odhiambo | 38.51 | WQ |
| 3 | 7 | Colombia | Neiker Abello, Carlos Palacios, Pedro Agualimpia, Carlos Flórez | 38.84 | |
| 4 | 9 | Paraguay | Jonathan Wolk, Misael Zalazar, Fredy Maidana, César Almirón | 39.37 | SB |
| 5 | 4 | Denmark | Valentin Jensen, Frederik Schou-Nielsen, Emil Frænde, Jason Lubago | 39.51 | |
| | 5 | Jamaica | Rohan Watson, Julian Forte, Yohan Blake, Kishane Thompson | DNF | |

==== Heat 3 ====
| Rank | Lane | Nation | Competitors | Time | Notes |
|---|---|---|---|---|---|
| 1 | 7 | China | Shi Junhao, Zeng Keli, Wang Shengjie, He Jinxian | 38.03 | WQ, SB |
| 2 | 5 | Australia | Lachlan Kennedy, Joshua Azzopardi, Christopher Ius, Prince Jackson | 38.31 | WQ |
| 3 | 8 | Botswana | Karabo Mothibi, Larona Mayana, Godiraone Kevin Lobatlamang, Tumo van Wyk | 38.53 | |
| 4 | 6 | Brazil | Vinícius Moraes, Vitor Hugo dos Santos, Erik Cardoso, Felipe Bardi | 38.64 | |
| 5 | 9 | Thailand | Natawat Iamudom, Thawatchai Himaiad, Chayut Khongprasit, Puripol Boonson | 39.20 | |
| 6 | 4 | Spain | Alejandro Rueda, Juan Carlos Castillo, Adria Alfonso, Ricardo Sánchez | 39.53 | SB |

=== Final ===
The final was held on 11 May 2025, starting at 21:26 (UTC+8) in the evening.

| Rank | Lane | Nation | Competitors | Time | Notes |
|---|---|---|---|---|---|
| 1st place, gold medalist(s) | 8 | South Africa | Bayanda Walaza, Sinesipho Dambile, Bradley Nkoana, Akani Simbine | 37.61 | WL |
| 2nd place, silver medalist(s) | 5 | United States | Courtney Lindsey, Kenny Bednarek, Kyree King, Brandon Hicklin | 37.66 | SB |
| 3rd place, bronze medalist(s) | 4 | Canada | Aaron Brown, Jerome Blake, Brendon Rodney, Andre De Grasse | 38.11 | |
| 4 | 7 | Japan | Naoki Okami, Naoki Nishioka, Rai Atago, Naoki Inoue | 38.17 | |
| 5 | 9 | Italy | Fausto Desalu, Matteo Melluzzo, Lorenzo Patta, Filippo Tortu | 38.20 | |
| 6 | 2 | Germany | Kevin Kranz, Owen Ansah, Julian Wagner, Lucas Ansah-Peprah | 38.92 | |
| | 3 | Poland | Patryk Krupa, Oliwer Wdowik, Łukasz Żak, Dominik Kopeć | DNF | |
| | 6 | Great Britain | Romell Glave, Nethaneel Mitchell-Blake, Jona Efoloko, Eugene Amo-Dadzie | DNF | |
