= Naoki Inoue (sprinter) =

Japanese sprinter

Personal information
- Born: 16 September 2003 (age 22)

Sport
- Sport: Athletics
- Event: Sprint

Achievements and titles
- Personal best(s): 100m 10.12 (2025); 200m 21.53 (2022)

Naoki Inoue (born 16 September 2003) is a Japanese sprinter.

== Biography ==
Competing for Waseda University he ran 10.19 seconds to win the 100 metres at the All Japan University Track & Field Challenge in April 2023.

In April 2025, he ran a new personal best of 10.12 seconds to win the Oda Mikio Memorial International in Hiroshima. He competed at the 2025 World Athletics Relays in China in the Men's 4 × 100 metres relay in May 2025. During the competition he helped Japan secure a qualifying place for the upcoming World Championships and place fourth overall.

He equalled his personal best of 10.12 seconds for the 100 metres at the Golden Grand Prix in Tokyo in May 2025, where he placed fourth overall. He placed fourth in the 100 metres at the Japanese Athletics Championships in Tokyo in July 2025.

He was named in the Japanese team for the relay at the 2025 World Athletics Championships in Tokyo, Japan.

In May 2026, he ran at the 2026 World Athletics Relays in the men's 4 × 100 metres relay in Gaborone, Botswana.
