= Naoki Okami =

Japanese sprinter

Personal information
- Born: 17 January 2000 (age 26)

Sport
- Sport: Athletics
- Event: Sprint

Achievements and titles
- Personal best(s): 100m 10.15 (2023); 200m 21.30 (2024)

Naoki Okami (born 17 January 2000) is a Japanese sprinter. He placed second in the 100 metres at the 2025 Japanese Athletics Championships.

== Career ==
He competed at the 2025 World Athletics Relays in China in the Men's 4 × 100 metres relay in May 2025. During the competition he helped Japan secure a qualifying place for the upcoming World Championships and place fourth overall.

He placed second in the 100 metres at the Japanese Athletics Championships in Tokyo in July 2025 behind Yoshihide Kiryū. He was named in the Japanese team for the 2025 World Athletics Championships in Tokyo, Japan.
