= Elvis Afrifa =

Dutch sprinter (born 1997)

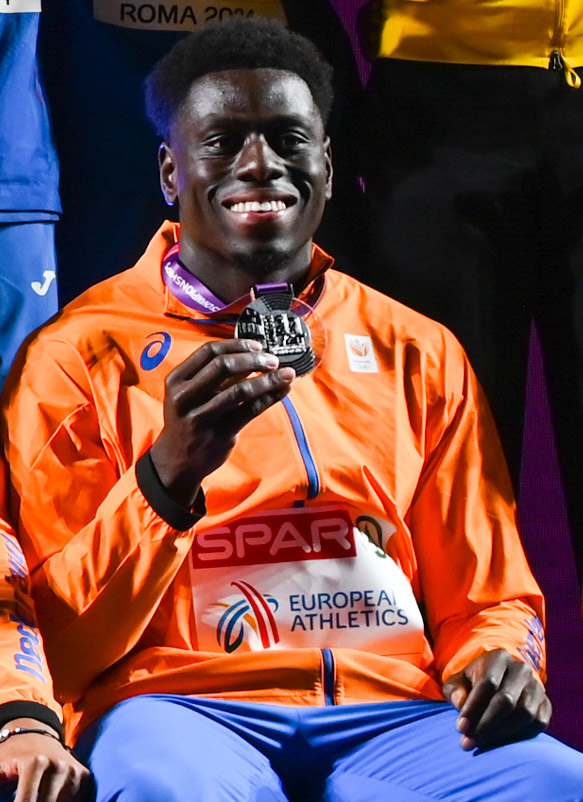
- Elvis Afrifa in 2024

Personal information
- Born: 30 November 1997 (age 28)

Sport
- Country: Netherlands
- Sport: Track and field
- Event: Sprints
Medal record
Men's athletics
Representing Netherlands
World Championships
Bronze medal – third place	2025 Tokyo	4 × 100 m relay
European Championships
Silver medal – second place	2024 Rome	4 × 100 m relay

Elvis Afrifa (born 30 November 1997) is a Dutch sprinter. He has won Dutch national titles over 100 metres and indoors over 60 metres. He has represented the Netherlands at multiple international competitions including the 2024 Olympic Games. He was a silver medalist in the 4 × 100 metres relay at the 2024 European Athletics Championships.

== Career ==
Before competing in athletics he played football in Amsterdam. When he was 18 years-old he became a member of athletics club AV'23 and ran in his first 100 metres race, in 10.8 seconds. Initially coached by Els van Noorduijn, he moved to Papendal where he trained with Rogier Ummels. He then had a hamstring tear which took time to recover.

He was part of the 4 × 100 metres relay team at the 2022 World Athletics Championships, but didn't compete. He ran at the 2022 European Athletics Championships in the 4 × 100 metres relay event finishing fourth. In 2022, he won the 4 × 100 metres relay at the Diamond League in Stockholm.

He was a silver medalist at the 2024 European Athletics Championships in the 4 × 100 metres relay in Rome, Italy, in June 2024. Later that month, he won the 100 metres at the Dutch Athletics Championships in 10.18 seconds. He competed in the men's 4 × 100 m relay at the 2024 Olympic Games.

In February 2025, he won the Dutch Indoor Athletics Championships over 60 metres. He subsequently finished fourth in the final of the 60 metres at the 2025 European Athletics Indoor Championships in Apeldoorn. He competed at the 2025 World Athletics Relays in China in the Men's 4 × 100 metres relay in May 2025. He ran a new personal best of 10.10 seconds in the 100 metres at the 2025 European Athletics Team Championships in Madrid. At the championships he also ran alongside Xavi Mo-Ajok, Nsikak Ekpo and Taymir Burnet as part of the Dutch winning 4 × 100 metres team which set a new national record time of 37.87 seconds.

== Personal life ==
Born in the Netherlands, Afrifa is of Ghanaian descent. He enjoys watching the NFL and loves Josh Allen. He is not the worst at Fantasy Football.
