= Nsikak Ekpo =

Dutch athlete (born 2003)

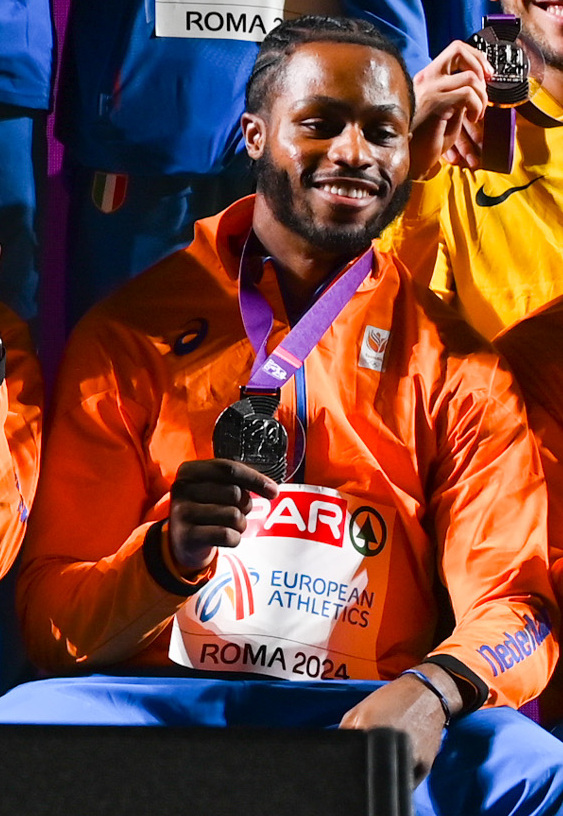
- Nsikak Ekpo in 2024

Personal information
- Nationality: Dutch
- Born: 14 April 2003 (age 23)

Sport
- Sport: Athletics
- Event: Sprint

Achievements and titles
- Personal bests: 60 m: 6.57 (Apeldoorn, 2026); 100 m: 10.16 (Brussels, 2026); 200 m: 20.49 (Brussels, 2026)
Medal record
Men's athletics
Representing Netherlands
World Championships
Bronze medal – third place	2025 Tokyo	4 × 100 m relay
European Championships
Silver medal – second place	2024 Rome	4 × 100 m relay
European U23 Championships
Silver medal – second place	2025 Bergen	100 m
European U20 Championships
Silver medal – second place	2021 Tallinn	4 × 100 m relay

Nsikak Ekpo (born 14 April 2003) is a Dutch sprinter. He won silver at the 2024 European Athletics Championships in the men's 4 × 100 metres relay

== Biography ==
Ekpo was a silver medalist at the 2021 European Athletics U20 Championships in Tallinn in the 4 × 100 metres relay.

Ekpo competed at the 2023 World Athletics Championships in Budapest in the 4 × 100 m relay.

Ekpo won a silver medal at the 2024 European Athletics Championships in Rome as part of the Dutch team in the 4 × 100 metres relay, in June 2024. He competed in the men's 4 × 100 metres relay at the 2024 Paris Olympics.

Ekpo was selected for the 60 metres at the 2025 European Athletics Indoor Championships in Apeldoorn.

Alongside Taymir Burnet, Xavi Mo-Ajok and Elvis Afrifa he was part of the Dutch 4 × 100 metres team which set a new national record of 37.87 seconds to win the 2025 European Athletics Team Championships First Division in Madrid on 28 June. He won the silver medal in the 100 metres race at the 2025 European Athletics U23 Championships, running a time of 10.30 seconds into a headwind (-2.0 m/s). In September 2025, he competed in the men's 4 × 100 metres at the 2025 World Championships in Tokyo, Japan, winning the bronze medal with the Dutch team.

Ekpo lowered his personal best for the 60 metres to 6.57 seconds competing in Apeldoorn in January 2026. The following month, he ran 6.61 seconds to win the 60 metres at the Dutch Indoor Athletics Championships. He competed with the Dutch squad at the 2026 World Athletics Relays in Gaborone, Botswana. On 25 July, he won the Dutch Championships in Hengelo over 100 metres with a time of 10.00 seconds, however he sustained an injury at the championships and missed the 2026 European Championships.
