= Naoki Izumiya =

Japanese businessman

- Born: 9 August 1948 (age 77)
- Education: Kyoto Sangyo University
- Occupation: Businessman
- Title: Chairman and CEO, Asahi Breweries

Naoki Izumiya (born 9 August 1948) is a Japanese businessman and the president and CEO of Asahi Breweries. He joined the company in 1972, became president in 2010, and was elevated to CEO and chairman in 2016.
