= Jeff Erius =

French athlete (born 2004)

Personal information
- Born: 8 March 2004 (age 22) Strasbourg, France
- Height: 188 cm (6 ft 2 in)
- Weight: 77 kg (170 lb)

Sport
- Country: France
- Sport: Athletics
- Event: Sprint

Achievements and titles
- Personal bests: 60m 6.58 (Miramas, 2024); 100m 9.98 (Albi, 2024)
Medal record
Men's athletics
Representing France
World Relays
Bronze medal – third place	2024 Nassau	4×100 m relay
European U23 Championships
Gold medal – first place	2025 Bergen	100m
Gold medal – first place	2025 Bergen	4x100 m relay
European U20 Championships
Silver medal – second place	2021 Tallinn	100 m

Jeff Erius (born 8 March 2004) is a French sprinter. He is French national champion over 60 metres. He competed in the 4 x 100 metres relay at the 2024 Olympic Games.

== Biography ==
Erius participated in 2021 at the age of 17 years-old in the 2021 French Athletics Championships in Angers, placing third in the 200 meters event. He won silver in the 100 metres at the 2021 European Athletics U20 Championships in Tallinn in 10.27 seconds.

On February 18, 2023, in Aubière at the 2023 French Indoor Athletics Championships he won his first senior national title by winning the 60 meters in a time of 6.62 seconds, establishing a new French junior record. He competed at the 2023 European Athletics Indoor Championships in Istanbul and the 2023 European Athletics Team Championships in Silesia, however a hamstring injury ruled him out for the rest of the season.

In February 2024, he retained his 60m French national title in Miramas running a personal best of 6.58 seconds. He was subsequently selected to compete for France at the 2024 World Athletics Indoor Championships in Glasgow, where he progressed through his heat of the 60 metres in 6.63 seconds and ran the same time in the semi-finals without proceeding to the final.

He was part of the French 4 × 100 m relay team which won bronze at the 2024 World Athletics Relays in Nassau, Bahamas in May 2024. He competed in the men's 4 x 100 metres relay at the 2024 Paris Olympics as part of the French team which qualified for the final and placed sixth overall.

On 10 April 2025, he was named in the French team for the 2025 World Athletics Relays in Guangzhou, China in May 2025. He competed at the 2025 World Athletics Relays in China in the Men's 4 × 100 metres relay in May 2025. On the second day of the competition he helped France secure a qualifying place for the upcoming World Championships.

He won the gold medal in the 100 metres race at the 2025 European Athletics U23 Championships, winning with a time of 10.28 seconds into a headwind (-2.0 m/s). Later in the championships, he anchored the French men's 4 x 100 metres relay team to gold in a championship record time of 38.43 seconds. In September 2025, he competed in the men's 4 x 100 metres at the 2025 World Championships in Tokyo, Japan, as the French team placed seventh. The following month he joined the Pure athletics group in Florida, trained by Lance Brauman, and including Noah Lyles.

On 25 July 2026, Erius placed second in the 100 metres at the 2026 French Championships in wet weather conditions.

== Personal life ==
He is from Strasbourg.
