= Nikola Karamanolov =

Bulgarian sprinter (born 2005)

Personal information
- Born: 9 March 2005 (age 21)

Sport
- Sport: Athletics
- Event: Sprint

Achievements and titles
- Personal best(s): 60m: 6.60 (2026); 100m: 10.32 (2025); 200m: 21.52 (2024)

Nikola Karamanolov (born 9 March 2005) is a Bulgarian sprinter. He has won Bulgarian indoor national titles over 60 metres and competed at the 2025 and 2026 World Athletics Indoor Championships.

== Biography ==
Karamanolov won the 60 metres titles at the Bulgarian Indoor Championships in 2024, and that summer ran 10.50 seconds for the 100 metres in June 2024. He competed for Bulgaria at the 2024 World Athletics U20 Championships in Lima, Peru, reaching the semi-finals.

Karamanolov won the 60 metres title again at the Bulgarian Indoor Championships in February 2025. He was a semi-finalist on his senior major championships debut, competing in the 60 m at the 2025 European Athletics Indoor Championships in Apeldoorn, Netherlands in March 2025. That month, he represented Bulgaria at the 2025 World Athletics Indoor Championships in Nanjing, China.

Runner-up to Hristo Iliev over 60 metres at the 2026 Bulgarian Indoor Championships in 6.60 seconds. He was subsequently selected for the 2026 World Athletics Indoor Championships in Toruń, Poland, where he ran 6.68 seconds, without advancing to the semi-finals.
