= List of European under-23 records in athletics =

European U23 records in the sport of athletics are ratified by the European Athletics Association (EAA). Athletics records comprise the best performance of an athlete before the year of their 23rd birthday. Technically, in all under-23 age divisions, the age is calculated "on December 31 of the year of competition" to avoid age group switching during a competitive season.

== Outdoor ==
Pending ratification Best unratified mark Record not kept by EAA Not ratified or later rescinded by EAA

=== Men ===
Event	Record	Athlete	Nationality	Date	Meet	Place	Age	Ref.
100 m	9.92 (+2.0 m/s)	Christophe Lemaitre	France	29 July 2011	French Championships	Albi, France	21 years, 48 days	
200 m	19.80 (+0.8 m/s)	Christophe Lemaitre	France	2 September 2011	World Championships	Daegu, South Korea	21 years, 83 days	
400 m	44.33	Thomas Schönlebe	East Germany	3 September 1987	World Championships	Rome, Italy	22 years, 28 days	
600 m	1:14.55	Adam Kszczot	Poland	5 August 2009	Lahti Salpausselän Suvi-ilta	Lahti, Finland	19 years, 337 days	
800 m	1:42.47	Yuriy Borzakovskiy	Russia	24 August 2001	Memorial van Damme	Brussels, Belgium	20 years, 134 days	
1000 m	2:14.37	Niels Laros	Netherlands	7 July 2024	FBK Games	Hengelo, Netherlands	19 years, 81 days	
1500 m	3:28.32	Jakob Ingebrigtsen	Norway	7 August 2021	Olympic Games	Tokyo, Japan	20 years, 322 days	
Mile	3:45.94	Niels Laros	Netherlands	5 July 2025	Prefontaine Classic	Eugene, United States	20 years, 79 days	
Mile (road)	4:04.3 h	Simone Valduga	Italy	7 September 2025	Kö Mile	Düsseldorf, Germany	21 years, 48 days	
2000 m	4:49.68	Niels Laros	Netherlands	8 September 2023	Memorial Van Damme	Brussels, Belgium	18 years, 144 days	
3000 m	7:27.05	Jakob Ingebrigtsen	Norway	17 September 2020	Golden Gala	Rome, Italy	19 years, 364 days	
5000 m	12:48.45	Jakob Ingebrigtsen	Norway	10 June 2021	Golden Gala	Florence, Italy	20 years, 264 days	
10,000 m	27:24.09	Ali Kaya	Turkey	2 May 2015	Turkish Championships	Mersin, Turkey	21 years, 12 days	
10 km (road)	27:54	Juan Zijderlaan	Netherlands	22 February 2026	10K Facsa Castellón	Castellón de la Plana, Spain	20 years, 148 days	
10 km (road)	27:25	Julien Wanders	Switzerland	30 December 2018	Corrida Pedestre Internationale de Houilles	Paris, France	22 years, 287 days	
15 km (road)	42:30+	Ali Kaya	Turkey	24 April 2016	Istanbul Half Marathon	Istanbul, Turkey	22 years, 4 days	
20 km (road)	57:07+	Ali Kaya	Turkey	24 April 2016	Istanbul Half Marathon	Istanbul, Turkey	22 years, 4 days	
20 km (road)	57:07+	Julien Wanders	Switzerland	11 February 2018	Barcelona Half Marathon	Barcelona, Spain	21 years, 330 days	
Half marathon	1:00:09	Julien Wanders	Switzerland	11 February 2018	Barcelona Half Marathon	Barcelona, Spain	21 years, 330 days	
Half marathon	59:53a	Benoit Zwierzchlewski	France	9 February 1997		Las Vegas, United States	20 years, 174 days	
Marathon	2:10:47	Henrik Jørgensen	Denmark	17 April 1983		London, United Kingdom	21 years, 189 days	
110 m hurdles	12.97 (+1.0 m/s)	Ladji Doucouré	France	15 July 2005		Angers, France	22 years, 109 days	
300 m hurdles	35.45	Alain-Hervé Mfomkpa	Switzerland	25 May 2017	Nationales Auffahrtsmeeting	Langenthal, Switzerland	20 years, 355 days	
400 m hurdles	47.64	Karsten Warholm	Norway	9 August 2018	European Championships	Berlin, Germany	22 years, 162 days	
3000 m steeplechase	8:10.83	Günther Weidlinger	Austria	21 August 1999	World Championships	Seville, Spain	21 years, 138 days	
3000 m steeplechase	8:10.36	Frank Baumgartl	East Germany	28 July 1976	Olympic Games	Montreal, Canada	21 years, 60 days	
High jump	2.42 m	Patrik Sjöberg	Sweden	30 June 1987	DN Galan	Stockholm, Sweden	22 years, 176 days	
Pole vault	6.15 m (Note: outdoor best; indoor mark ratified as absolute record)	Armand Duplantis	Sweden	17 September 2020	Golden Gala	Rome, Italy	20 years, 312 days	
Long jump	8.86 m (+1.9 m/s)	Robert Emmiyan	Soviet Union	22 May 1987		Tsaghkadzor, Soviet Union	22 years, 95 days	
Triple jump	17.98 m (+1.2 m/s)	Teddy Tamgho	France	12 June 2010		New York City, United States	20 years, 362 days	
Shot put	22.25 m	Konrad Bukowiecki	Poland	14 September 2019	Kamila Skolimowska Memorial	Chorzów, Poland	22 years, 181 days	
Discus throw	74.35 m	Mykolas Alekna	Lithuania	14 April 2024	Oklahoma Throws Series World Invitational	Ramona, United States	21 years, 200 days	
Hammer throw	81.70 m	Olli-Pekka Karjalainen	Finland	16 June 2002	Eliittikisat	Lahti, Finland	22 years, 101 days	
Hammer throw	83.54 m	Igor Nikulin	Soviet Union	2 September 1982		Athens, Greece	22 years, 19 days	
Javelin throw	90.20 m	Max Dehning	Germany	25 February 2024	German Winter Throwing Championships	Halle, Germany	19 years, 169 days	
Decathlon	8691 pts	Niklas Kaul	Germany	2–3 October 2019	World Championships	Doha, Qatar	21 years, 234 days	
Decathlon	100m (wind) / Long jump (wind) / Shot put / High jump / 400m / 110m H (wind) / Discus / Pole vault / Javelin / 1500m; 11.27 (+0.3 m/s) / 7.19 m (+0.6 m/s) / 15.10 m / 2.02 m / 48.48 / 14.64 (+0.7 m/s) / 49.20 m / 5.00 m / 79.05 m / 4:15.70							
Decathlon	8706 pts	Frank Busemann	Germany	1 August 1996	Olympic Games	Atlanta, United States	21 years, 157 days	
Decathlon	100m (wind) / Long jump (wind) / Shot put / High jump / 400m / 110m H (wind) / Discus / Pole vault / Javelin / 1500m; 10.60 (+0.7 m/s) / 8.07 m (+0.8 m/s) / 13.60 m / 2.04 m / 48.34 / 13.47 (+0.3 m/s) / 45.04 m / 4.80 m / 66.86 m / 4:31.41							
5000 m walk (track)	18:56.19	Nicolo' Vidal	Italy	8 August 2026	World U20 Championships	Eugene, United States	18 years, 97 days	
20 km walk (road)	1:17:16	Vladimir Kanaykin	Russia	29 September 2007	IAAF Race Walking Challenge	Saransk, Russia	22 years, 192 days	
20 km walk (road)	1:16:43	Sergey Morozov	Russia	8 June 2008	Russian Championships	Saransk, Russia	20 years, 79 days	
50 km walk (road)	3:38:58	Mikhail Ryzhov	Russia	14 August 2013	World Championships	Moscow, Russia	21 years, 240 days	
4 × 100 m relay	38.43	Maxime Rebierre; Yoran Kabengele Kabala; Mohammed Badru; Jeff Erius	France	20 July 2025	European U23 Championships	Bergen, Norway	21 years, 134 days	
4 × 400 m relay	3:02.02	David Garcia; Ángel González; Markel Fernández; Gerson Pozo	Spain	20 July 2025	European U23 Championships	Bergen, Norway	20 years, 44 days 22 years, 164 days	

=== Women ===
Event	Record	Athlete	Nationality	Date	Meet	Place	Age	Ref.
100 m	10.88 (+2.0 m/s)	Marlies Oelsner	East Germany	1 July 1977	East German Championships	Dresden, Germany	19 years, 102 days	
100 m	10.77 (+0.7 m/s)	Ivet Lalova	Bulgaria	19 June 2004	European Cup First League	Plovdiv, Bulgaria	20 years, 32 days	
200 m	21.71 (+0.7 m/s)	Marita Koch	East Germany	10 June 1979		Karl-Marx-Stadt, East Germany	22 years, 112 days	
200 m	21.71 (+1.2 m/s)	Heike Drechsler	East Germany	29 June 1986	European Championships	Jena, East Germany	21 years, 195 days	
400 m	48.60	Marita Koch	East Germany	4 August 1979	European Cup	Turin, Italy	22 years, 167 days	
400 m	48.25	Olga Vladykina	Soviet Union	6 October 1985	IAAF World Cup	Canberra, Australia	22 years, 98 days	
600 m	1:22.85	Audrey Werro	Switzerland	23 June 2026	Biel/Bienne Athletics Abendmeeting	Biel, Switzerland	22 years, 88 days	
800 m	1:53.98	Audrey Werro	Switzerland	7 June 2026	Bauhausgalan	Stockholm, Sweden	22 years, 72 days	
800 m	1:53.80	Audrey Werro	Switzerland	28 June 2026	Meeting de Paris	Paris, France	22 years, 93 days	
1000 m	2:30.85	Martina Kämpfert	East Germany	9 July 1980		East Berlin, East Germany	20 years, 241 days	
1500 m	3:56.05	Sifan Hassan	Netherlands	17 July 2015	Herculis	Fontvieille, Monaco	22 years, 187 days	
Mile (road)	4:42.3 h	Nel Vanopstal	Belgium	7 September 2025	Kö Mile	Düsseldorf, Germany	21 years, 10 days	
3000 m	8:20.07	Konstanze Klosterhalfen	Germany	30 June 2019	Prefontaine Classic	Eugene, United States	22 years, 104 days	
5000 m	14:24.68	Elvan Abeylegesse	Turkey	11 June 2004	Bislett Games	Bergen, Norway	21 years, 274 days	
10,000 m	30:26.41	Yasemin Can	Turkey	12 August 2016	Olympic Games	Rio de Janeiro, Brazil	19 years, 245 days	
10 km (road)	31:23	Alina Reh	Germany	14 October 2018		Berlin, Germany	21 years, 144 days	
10 km (road)	31:22	Megan Keith	Great Britain	14 January 2024	10K Valencia Ibercaja	Valencia, Spain	21 years, 266 days	
Marathon	2:29:06 Mx	Becky Briggs	Great Britain	3 April 2022	Manchester Marathon	Manchester, United Kingdom	22 years, 32 days	
100 m hurdles	12.40 (+0.8 m/s)	Ditaji Kambundji	Switzerland	8 June 2024	European Championships	Rome, Italy	22 years, 19 days	
200 m hurdles (bend)	25.8 h (+0.6 m/s)	Annelie Jahns-Erdhardt	East Germany	5 July 1970		Erfurt, East Germany		
200 m hurdles (bend)	25.8 h (−0.9 m/s)	Teresa Sukniewicz	Poland	9 August 1970		Warsaw, Poland	21 years, 272 days	
300 m hurdles	36.86	Femke Bol	Netherlands	31 May 2022	Golden Spike Ostrava	Ostrava, Czech Republic	22 years, 97 days	
400 m hurdles	52.03	Femke Bol	Netherlands	4 August 2021	Olympic Games	Tokyo, Japan	21 years, 162 days	
3000 m steeplechase	9:13.46	Anna Emilie Møller	Denmark	30 September 2019	World Championships	Doha, Qatar	22 years, 64 days	
High jump	2.09 m	Stefka Kostadinova	Bulgaria	30 August 1987	World Championships	Rome, Italy	22 years, 158 days	
Pole vault	4.92 m	Yelena Isinbayeva	Russia	3 September 2004	Memorial van Damme	Brussels, Belgium	22 years, 92 days	
Long jump	7.45 m (+0.9 m/s)	Heike Drechsler	East Germany	21 June 1986		Tallinn, Soviet Union	21 years, 187 days	
Triple jump	14.79 m (−0.7 m/s)	Anna Pyatykh	Russia	21 June 2003	European Cup Super League	Florence, Italy	22 years, 78 days	
Shot put	22.53 m	Natalya Lisovskaya	Soviet Union	27 May 1984		Sochi, Soviet Union	21 years, 316 days	
Discus throw	73.36 m	Irina Meszynski	East Germany	17 August 1984		Prague, Czechoslovakia	22 years, 146 days	
Discus throw	74.56 m	Ilke Wyludda	East Germany	23 July 1989		Neubrandenburg, East Germany	20 years, 117 days	
Hammer throw	77.06 m	Tatyana Lysenko	Russia	15 July 2005	Vladimir Kuts Memorial	Moscow, Russia	21 years, 279 days	
Javelin throw	68.43 m	Sara Kolak	Croatia	6 July 2017	Athletissima	Lausanne, Switzerland	22 years, 14 days	
Javelin throw	70.78 m	Mariya Abakumova	Russia	21 August 2008	Olympic Games	Beijing, China	22 years, 219 days	
Heptathlon	7001 pts	Carolina Klüft	Sweden	24 August 2003	World Championships	Saint-Denis, France	20 years, 203 days	
Heptathlon	100m H (wind) / High jump / Shot put / 200m (wind) / Long jump (wind) / Javelin / 800m; 13.18 (−0.4 m/s) / 1.94 m / 14.19 m / 22.98 (+1.1 m/s) / 6.68 m (+1.0 m/s) / 49.90 m / 2:12.12							
5000 m walk	20:07.52	Beate Anders	East Germany	23 June 1990		Rostock, East Germany	22 years, 139 days	
5 km walk	20:05	Olga Polyakova	Russia	28 May 2000		Saransk, Russia	19 years, 248 days	
20 km walk (road)	1:25:02	Elena Lashmanova	Russia	11 August 2012	Olympic Games	London, United Kingdom	20 years, 124 days	
Marathon walk	3:25:42	Sofia Fiorini	Italy	12 April 2026	World Race Walking Team Championships	Brasília, Brazil	21 years, 236 days	
Marathon walk	3:15:11	Sofia Fiorini	Italy	15 August 2026	European Championships	Birmingham, United Kingdom	21 years, 236 days	
4 × 100 m relay	42.09	Christina Brehmer; Romy Schneider; Ingrid Auerswald; Marlies Göhr	East Germany	4 August 1979	European Cup	Turin, Italy	21 years, 157 days 21 years, 9 days 21 years, 336 days 21 years, 136 days	
4 × 400 m relay	3:26.52	Rebecca Grieve; Emily Newnham; Poppy Malik; Yemi Mary John	Great Britain	20 July 2025	European U23 Championships	Bergen, Norway	20 years, 171 days 21 years, 62 days 21 years, 235 days 22 years, 78 days	
4 × 400 m relay	3:21.20	Christiane Marquardt; Barbara Krug; Christina Brehmer; Marita Koch	East Germany	3 September 1978	European Championships	Prague, Czech Republic	19 years, 294 days 22 years, 120 days 20 years, 187 days 21 years, 197 days	

== Indoor ==
=== Men ===
Event	Record	Athlete	Nationality	Date	Meet	Place	Age	Ref.	Video
50 m	5.64	Alex Porkhomovski	Russia	4 February 1994	Russian Winter Meeting	Moscow Russia	21 years, 176 days		
60 m	6.53	Hristo Iliev	Bulgaria	21 February 2026	Balkan Championships	Belgrade, Serbia	21 years, 49 days		
60 m	6.51	Jason Livingston	Great Britain	8 February 1992		Glasgow, Great Britain	20 years, 328 days		
60 m	6.51	Haralabos Papadias	Greece	14 February 1997		Pireaus, Greece	22 years, 21 days		
60 m	6.51	Mark Lewis-Francis	Great Britain	11 March 2001	World Championships	Lisbon, Portugal	18 years, 188 days		
60 m	6.51	Hristo Iliev	Bulgaria	28 February 2026	Bulgarian Championships	Sofia, Bulgaria	21 years, 56 days		
60 m	6.50	Haralabos Papadias	Greece	7 March 1997	World Championships	Paris, France	22 years, 42 days		
60 m	6.48	Jimmy Vicaut	France	2 March 2013	European Championships	Gothenburg, Sweden	21 years, 3 days		
200 m	20.43	Erik Erlandsson	Sweden	4 February 2025	Czech Indoor Gala	Ostrava, Czech Republic	20 years, 258 days		
200 m	20.36	Bruno Marie-Rose	France	22 February 1987	European Championships	Liévin, France	21 years, 278 days		
400 m	45.31	Maksymilian Szwed	Poland	8 March 2025	European Championships	Apeldoorn, Netherlands	20 years, 214 days		
600 m	1:15.31 A	Thomas Staines	Great Britain	1 February 2019	New Mexico Classic	Albuquerque, United States	20 years, 344 days		
800 m	1:45.75	Bartosz Kitliński	Poland	19 January 2025	CMCM Luxembourg Meeting	Kirchberg, Luxembourg	20 years, 222 days		
800 m	1:44.15	Yuriy Borzakovskiy	Russia	27 January 2001	Indoor Meeting Karlsruhe	Karlsruhe, Germany	19 years, 290 days		
1000 m
1000 m	2:17.16	Viktor Chudinovskiy	Russia	7 January 2009	Yekaterinburg Yalamov Memorial	Yekaterinburg, Russia	19 years, 55 days		
1500 m	3:34.32	Håkon Moe Berg	Norway	22 January 2026	BAUHAUS-galan Indoor	Stockholm, Sweden	19 years, 210 days		
1500 m	3:33.96	Håkon Moe Berg	Norway	19 February 2026	Meeting Hauts-de-France Pas-de-Calais	Liévin, France	19 years, 238 days		
1500 m	3:30.60	Jakob Ingebrigtsen	Norway	17 February 2022	Meeting Hauts-de-France Pas-de-Calais	Liévin, France	21 years, 151 days		
Mile
Mile	3:52.70	Stefan Nillessen	Netherlands	13 February 2025	Meeting Hauts-de-France Pas-de-Calais	Liévin, France	22 years, 42 days		
Mile	3:53.65	Josh Kerr	Great Britain	9 February 2019	Millrose Games	New York City, United States	21 years, 124 days		
Mile	3:52.44	Pierre-Antoine Attiogbe	France	13 February 2026	Boston University David Hemery Valentine Invitational	Boston, United States	20 years, 334 days		
3000 m	7:37.10	Stefan Nillessen	Netherlands	7 February 2025	Indoor Meeting Karlsruhe	Karlsruhe, Germany	22 years, 36 days		
3000 m	7:29.49	Niels Laros	Netherlands	13 February 2025	Meeting Hauts-de-France Pas-de-Calais	Liévin, France	19 years, 302 days		
5000 m	13:12.55	Polat Kemboi Arikan	Turkey	10 February 2012	PSD Bank Meeting	Düsseldorf, Germany	21 years, 60 days		
60 m hurdles	7.51	Elie Bacari	Belgium	19 January 2025	CMCM Meeting	Kirchberg, Luxembourg	21 years, 97 days		
60 m hurdles	7.51	Elie Bacari	Belgium	6 March 2025	European Championships	Apeldoorn, Netherlands	21 years, 143 days		
60 m hurdles	7.41	Colin Jackson	Great Britain	26 February 1989		Sindelfingen, Germany	22 years, 8 days		
300 m hurdles	34.26 OT ^{[WB]}	Karsten Warholm	Norway	10 February 2018	Avoimet Pirkanmaan	Tampere, Finland	21 years, 347 days		
High jump	2.41 m	Patrik Sjoberg	Sweden	1 February 1987		Pireaus, Greece	22 years, 27 days		
Pole vault	6.18 m	Armand Duplantis	Sweden	15 February 2020	Glasgow Indoor Grand Prix	Glasgow, United Kingdom	20 years, 97 days		
Long jump	8.56 m	Yago Lamela	Spain	7 March 1999	World Championships	Maebashi, Japan	21 years, 226 days		
Triple jump	17.92 m (2nd jump)	Teddy Tamgho	France	6 March 2011	European Championships	Paris, France	21 years, 264 days		
Triple jump	17.92 m (4th jump)	Teddy Tamgho	France	6 March 2011	European Championships	Paris, France	21 years, 264 days		
Shot put	22.00 m	Konrad Bukowiecki	Poland	15 February 2018	Copernicus Cup	Toruń, Poland	20 years, 335 days		
Heptathlon
Heptathlon	6297 pts	Kevin Mayer	France	3 March 2013	European Championships	Gothenburg, Sweden	21 years, 21 days		
Heptathlon	60m / Long jump / Shot put / High jump / 60m H / Pole vault / 1000m; 7.10 / 7.54m / 15.16m / 2.05m / 8.01 / 5.20m / 2:37.30								
3000 m walk	10:52.77	Callum Wilkinson	Great Britain	25 February 2018	Müller Indoor Grand Prix	Glasgow, United Kingdom	20 years, 348 days		
5000 m walk	18:15.91	Mikhail Shchennikov	Soviet Union	4 February 1989		Gomel, USSR	21 years, 42 days		
4 × 400 m relay									

=== Women ===
Event	Record	Athlete	Nationality	Date	Meet	Place	Age	Ref.
50 m	6.09	Zhanna Tarnopolskaya	Ukraine	23 February 1986		Moscow, Russia	20 years, 211 days	
60 m	7.14	Karolína Maňasová	Czech Republic	9 March 2025	European Championships	Apeldoorn, Netherlands	21 years, 109 days	
60 m	7.10	Karolína Maňasová	Czech Republic	9 March 2025	European Championships	Apeldoorn, Netherlands	21 years, 109 days	
60 m	7.00	Nelli Cooman	Netherlands	23 February 1986	European Championships	Madrid, Spain	21 years, 262 days	
200 m	23.00	Nora Lindahl	Sweden	23 February 2025	Swedish Championships	Växjö, Sweden	20 years, 166 days	
200 m	22.52 A	Rhasidat Adeleke	Ireland	21 January 2023	Dr. Martin Luther King Collegiate Invitational	Albuquerque, New Mexico, United States	20 years, 145 days	
400 m
400 m	49.76	Taťána Kocembová	Czechoslovakia	2 February 1984		Vienna, Austria	21 years, 276 days	
600 m	1:23.41	Keely Hodgkinson	Great Britain	28 January 2023	Manchester World Indoor Tour	Manchester, United Kingdom	20 years, 331 days	
800 m	1:56.64	Audrey Werro	Switzerland	22 March 2026	World Indoor Championships	Toruń, Poland	21 years, 360 days	
1000 m	2:34.8 h	Brigitte Kraus	West Germany	19 February 1978		Dortmund, West Germany	21 years, 191 days	
1500 m
1500 m	4:00.46	Sifan Hassan	Netherlands	19 February 2015	Stockholm XL Galan	Stockholm, Sweden	22 years, 49 days	
1500 m	4:00.52	Jemma Reekie	Great Britain	8 February 2020	Millrose Games	New York City, United States	21 years, 339 days	
1500 m	4:05.27	Adèle Gay	France	19 February 2026	Meeting Hauts-de-France Pas-de-Calais	Liévin, France	21 years, 126 days	
3000 m	8:32.47	Konstanze Klosterhalfen	Germany	16 February 2019	German Championships	Leipzig, Germany	21 years, 363 days	
60 m hurdles	7.77	Zofia Bielczyk	Poland	1 March 1980	European Championships	Sindelfingen, Germany	21 years, 161 days	
High jump	2.06 m	Yaroslava Mahuchikh	Ukraine	2 February 2021	Banskobystricka latka	Banská Bystrica, Slovakia	19 years, 136 days	
Pole vault	4.87 m	Holly Bleasdale	Great Britain	20 January 2012	Villeurbanne INSA Perch'formance	Villeurbanne, France	20 years, 79 days	
Long jump	7.29 m	Heike Drechsler	East Germany	25 January 1986		Berlin, Germany	21 years, 40 days	
Triple jump	14.76 m	Tereza Marinova	Bulgaria	24 February 1999		Piraeus, Greece	21 years, 152 days	
Triple jump	14.76 m	Tereza Marinova	Bulgaria	7 March 1999	World Championships	Maebashi, Japan	21 years, 163 days	
Shot put	21.12 m	Ilona Slupianek	East Germany	13 March 1977	European Championships	San Sebastián, Spain	20 years, 170 days	
Pentathlon	4922 pts	Saga Vanninen	Finland	9 March 2025	European Championships	Apeldoorn, Netherlands	21 years, 309 days	
Pentathlon	60m H / High jump / Shot put / Long jump / 800m; 8.19 / 1.81 m / 15.56 m / 6.52 m / 2:12.20							
Pentathlon	5000 pts	Katarina Johnson-Thompson	Great Britain	6 March 2015	European Championships	Prague, Czech Republic	22 years, 56 days	
Pentathlon	60m H / High jump / Shot put / Long jump / 800m; 8.18 / 1.95m / 12.32m / 6.89m / 2:12.78							
3000 m walk	11:40.33 ^{[WR]}	Claudia Iovan	Romania	30 January 1999		Bucharest, Romania	20 years, 339 days	
5000 m walk	20:23.2	Yekaterina Medvedeva	Russia	9 February 2016		Saransk, Russia	22 years, 276 days	
10,000 m walk	45:14.71	Alesia Savaneuskaya	Belarus	14 February 2025	Belarusian Championships	Mogilev, Belarus	19 years, 155 days	
4 × 400 m relay								
