= Samuele Ceccarelli =

Italian sprinter (born 2000)

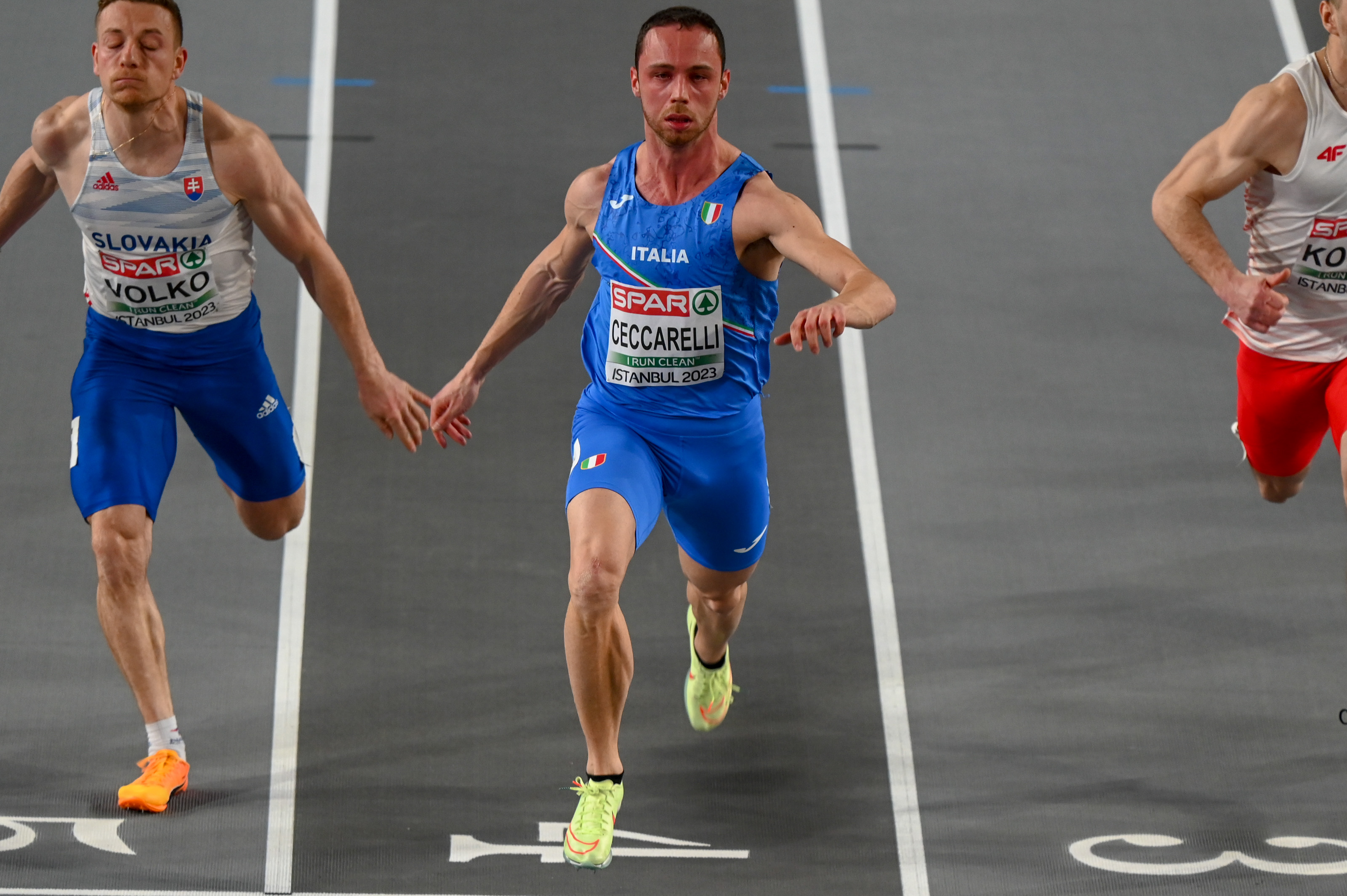
- Ceccarelli at the European Indoor Championships in Istanbul

Personal information
- Born: 9 January 2000 (age 26) Massa, Italy
- Height: 1.84 m (6 ft 0 in)
- Weight: 80 kg (176 lb)

Sport
- Country: Italy
- Sport: Athletics
- Event: Sprints
- Club: Atletica Firenze Marathon
- Coached by: Marco Del Medico

Achievements and titles
- Personal bests: 60 m: 6.47i (Istanbul 2023); 100 m: 10.13 (Florence 2023; Chorzów 2023); 200 m: 21.60 (Campi Bisenzio 2018); 4 × 100 m relay: 38.47 (Chorzów 2023)
Medal record
Men's athletics
Representing Italy
European Indoor Championships
Gold medal – first place	2023 Istanbul	60 m
European Games
Gold medal – first place	2023 Kraków-Małopolska	100 m
Silver medal – second place	2023 Kraków-Małopolska	4 × 100 m relay

Samuele Ceccarelli (born 9 January 2000) is an Italian sprinter. He won the gold medal in the 60 metres at the 2023 European Indoor Championships, defeating compatriot and Olympic champion Marcell Jacobs.

Ceccarelli won the Italian 60 m title in 2023, beating Jacobs as well.

== Career ==
Samuele Ceccarelli trained in karate initially until the age of 15. He switched to athletics at age 16.

He won several medals at the national under-20 level between 2018 and 2019. In January 2019, the 19-year-old set a 60 metres personal best of 6.72 seconds while still an U20 athlete.

His progress in following three years was hampered by persistent injuries and frequent micro-fractures.

In February 2023, he won his first national senior title with 60 m victory at the Italian Athletics Indoor Championships in Ancona, beating Olympic champion Marcell Jacobs. Ceccarelli repeated that feat on a European stage at Istanbul 2023 the following month for an Italian 1–2. He set a new personal best of 6.47 s in the semi-finals to move up to second on the Italian all-time list (behind only Jacobs) and fifth on the European one.

== Statistics ==
=== International competitions ===
Representing Italy
Year	Competition	Venue	Position	Event	Time
2019	European U20 Championships	(Sweden) Borås	13th (sf)	100 m	10.62
2021	European U23 Championships	(Estonia) Tallinn	15th (h)	100 m	10.52
2021	European U23 Championships	(Estonia) Tallinn	9th (h)	4 × 100 m relay	40.52
2023	European Indoor Championships	(Turkey) Istanbul	1st	60 m	6.48
2023	European Team Championships	(Poland) Chorzów	1st	100 m	10.13 PB
2023	European Team Championships	(Poland) Chorzów	2nd	4 × 100 m relay	38.47

=== National titles ===
- Italian Athletics Indoor Championships
  - 60 metres: 2023

== See also ==
- Italian national track relay team
