= 2026 Gyulai István Memorial =

2026 Gyulai István Memorial 16th edition
- Edition: 16th
- Dates: 14 July 2026
- Host city: Budapest, Hungary
- Venue: Zsivotzky Gyula Nemzeti Atlétikai Központ
- Level: Senior
- Type: Outdoor
- Official website: https://gyulaimemorial.hu

The 2026 Gyulai István Memorial – Hungarian Athletics Grand Prix (Hungarian: Gyulai István Memorial – Atlétikai Magyar Nagydíj) was the 16th edition of the outdoor track and field for athletes in Budapest, Hungary. It was held on 14 July 2026 at the Zsivotzky Gyula Nemzeti Atlétikai Központ. The competition is part of an international event currently held under the auspices of the 2026 World Athletics Continental Tour.

The best performance is awarded the Spiriev Bojidar Trophy.

The memorial is named after István Gyulai, who died in 2006 and was the secretary of the World Athletics Federation.

== Records ==
The following records were set during the competition.

=== National records ===
Event	Record	Name	Nation
100 metres hurdles – women	12.59	Luca Kozák	Hungary
High jump – women	=1.98	Marija Vuković	Montenegro
200 metres – women	22.55	Sada Williams	Barbados
200 metres – men	19.92	Yassine Hssine	Morocco

=== World leading ===
The best mark achieved worldwide within a given season.

Event	Record	Name	Nation
Hammer Throw – men	83.64	Ethan Katzberg	Canada

=== Meeting records ===
Event	Record	Name	Nation
Hammer Throw – men	83.64	Ethan Katzberg	Canada
400 metres hurdles – men	47.58	Emil Agyekum	Germany
1500 metres – men	3:31.09	Phanuel Koech	Kenya
110 metres hurdles – men	12.85	Ja'Kobe Tharp	United States
Pole vault – women	4.80	Nina Kennedy	Australia
Pole vault – women	4.80	Eliza McCartney	Australia
High Jump – women	2.00	Eleanor Patterson	Australia
200 metres – women	21.83	Gabrielle Thomas	United States

== Results ==
Sources: Gyulai István Memorial, World Athletics

=== Men ===
The competitions are in chronological order.

Event	First		Second		Third	
Hammer Throw	Ethan Katzberg; Canada	83.64 MR, WL	Merlin Hummel; Germany	81.74 SB	Bence Halász; Hungary	81.65 SB
Pole vault	Armand Duplantis; Sweden	6.07	Kurtis Marschall; Australia	6.00 =PB	Emmanouil Karalis; Greece	5.90
400 metres hurdles	Emil Agyekum; Germany	47.58 MR, PB	Trevor Bassitt; United States	47.59	Caleb Dean; United States	47.62
200 metres	Yassine Hssine; Morocco	19.92 NR, PB	Makanakaishe Charamba; Zimbabwe	20.09	Udodi Chudi Onwuzurike; Nigeria	20.18 =SB
Long jump	Miltiadis Tentoglou; Greece	8.31	Anvar Anvarov; Uzbekistan	8.12	Simon Batz; Germany	8.12 SB
Shot put	Leonardo Fabbri; Italy	22.04	Rajindra Campbell; Jamaica	21.52	Chukwuebuka Enekwechi; Nigeria	21.48
3000 metres	Mathew Kipsang; Kenya	7:31.90	Anthony Camerieri; United States	7:32.64 PB	Jackson Sharp; Australia	7:33.59 PB
100 metres	Emmanuel Eseme; Cameroon	9.99	Abdul-Rasheed Saminu; Ghana	10.01 SB	Ackeem Blake; Jamaica	10.04
1500 metres	Phanuel Koech; Kenya	3:31.09 MR, SB	Danson Kiplangat; Kenya	3:31.10 PB	José Carlos Pinto; Portugal	3:31.47 PB
110 metres hurdles	Ja'Kobe Tharp; United States	12.85 MR	Jamal Britt; United States	13.01	Cordell Tinch; United States	13.06 SB
800 metres	Djamel Sedjati; Algeria	1:43.19 SB	Laban Chepkwony; Kenya	1:43.54 SB	David Barroso; Spain	1:43.60 PB
400 metres	Muzala Samukonga; Zambia	44.02 SB	Attila Molnár; Hungary	44.51	Zakithi Nene; South Africa	44.57

=== Women ===
The competitions are in chronological order.

Event	First		Second		Third	
Long jump	Monae Nichols; United States	6.88	Claire Bryant; United States	6.72	Ackelia Smith; Jamaica	6.67
Pole vault	Nina Kennedy; Australia	4.80 MR	Eliza McCartney; New Zealand	4.80 MR	Tina Šutej; Slovenia	4.75
High Jump	Eleanor Patterson; Australia	2.00 MR, =SB	Nicola Olyslagers; Australia	1.98	Marija Vuković; Montenegro	1.98 =NR, =PB
400 metres hurdles	Jasmine Jones; United States	52.91 SB	Rushell Clayton; Jamaica	53.34	Kemi Adekoya; Bahamas	54.18
200 metres	Gabrielle Thomas; United States	21.83 MR	Kayla White; United States	21.92 PB	Anavia Battle; United States	22.21 SB
1500 metres	Abbey Caldwell; Australia	4:01.79	Claudia Hollingsworth; Australia	4:02.09	Mirriam Cherop; Kenya	4:02.15 PB
100 metres	Julien Alfred; Saint Lucia	10.87 SB	Tina Clayton; Jamaica	10.97	Brianna Lyston; Jamaica	11.01
100 metres hurdles	Masai Russell; United States	12.33	Rayniah Jones; United States	12.47	Alaysha Johnson; United States	12.49

== Spiriev Bojidar Trophy ==
2026 Winner: (Sweden) Armand Duplantis

== See also ==
- List of Hungarian records in athletics
