= Kayla White =

American athlete

Personal information
- Born: September 24, 1996 (age 30) Miami, Florida, U.S.
- Education: North Carolina A&T State University; Miami Southridge Senior High School

Sport
- Country: United States
- Sport: Athletics
- Event: Sprint
- College team: North Carolina A&T Aggies
- Team: Nike
- Turned pro: 2019
- Coached by: Duane Ross; 2014–23; Dennis Mitchell; July 2023–present

Achievements and titles
- Personal bests: 100 m: 10.84 (Eugene, 2025); 200 m: 21.92 (Budapest, 2026)
Medal record
Women's athletics
Representing United States
World Championships
Gold medal – first place	2025 Tokyo	4 × 100 m relay
World Ultimate Championship
First place	2026 Budapest	4 × 100 m mixed
Third place	2026 Budapest	200 m
Diamond League
Second place	2026	200 m

Kayla White (born September 24, 1996) is an American track and field athlete who competes as a sprinter.

== Professional career ==
In April 2023, White beat Sha'Carri Richardson in the 200 meters at the inaugural Botswana Golden Grand Prix with a time of 22.38 seconds. Competing at the 2023 USA Outdoor Track and Field Championships, in Eugene, Oregon, she reached the semi-finals of the 100 m competition. In the 200 metres, White ran a new personal best time of 22.01s to finish third overall. She was selected for the 2023 World Athletics Championships in Budapest in August 2023, and qualified for the semi-finals in the 200 metres.

After 2023 USA Outdoor Track and Field Championships, White moved back to Florida to be coached by Dennis Mitchell.

She ran as part of the American 4 × 100 m relay team at the 2025 World Athletics Relays as they won their heat and qualified a team for the World Championships. She ran 10.89 seconds (+1.3 m/s) to win her preliminary heat of the 100 metres at the 2025 USA Outdoor Track and Field Championships. After winning her semi-final in 10.92 seconds, she then ran to a second place finish behind Melissa Jefferson-Wooden, with a new personal best time of 10.82 seconds (+0.4).

In September 2025, she was a semi-finalist in the 100 metres at the 2025 World Championships in Tokyo, Japan. She also ran in the women's 4 × 100 metres relay at the championships as part of the team which won the gold medal in the final for the American team.

On 26 April 2026, White ran 22.68 seconds to win over 200 metres at the Botswana Golden Grand Prix in Gaborone. On 31 May, she ran the 200 metres in 22.28 seconds to place second to compatriot Cambrea Sturgis at the 2026 Diamond League in Rabat and 22.07 seconds on 6 June to finish runner-up to Gabby Thomas at the USATF Lone Star Grand Prix in College Station, Texas. The following month, she ran 22.04 for the 200 m at the 2026 Herculis event in Monaco before setting a new 200 m personal best of 21.92 seconds at the István Gyulai Memorial, in Budapest. On 24 July, White finished runner-up at the USA Championships over 100 metres for the second consecutive year, finishing in 10.90 seconds behind only Sha'Carri Richardson. White won the first Diamond League victory of her career at the 2026 Athletissima in Lausanne on 21 August, running 22.18 seconds (+0.3m/s) to win the 200 metres ahead of world silver medallist Amy Hunt. At the 2026 Diamond League Final in Brussels on 4 September, White ran 22.00 seconds for second place in the 200 metres behind Julien Alfred. On 11 September, she was part of the winning American mixed 4 × 100 metres relay team at the inaugural 2026 World Athletics Ultimate Championship in Budapest, alongside Anavia Battle, Courtney Lindsey and Ronnie Baker. Two days later, she returned to compete in the 200 metres final, and finished as part of an American one-two-three with Melissa Jefferson-Wooden and Gabby Thomas, placing third in 21.93 seconds. On 18 September, she finished as runner-up to Gabby Thomas in the 200 m at Athlos in London.

== NCAA ==
In 2019 she became the NCAA indoor champion over 200 metres, running in 22.66 seconds in Birmingham, Alabama. She also finished second in the 60 m hurdles at the same event.

In 2019, White earned 5 NCAA Division I All-American awards and won 5 individual Mid-Eastern Athletic Conference titles at conference championships.

In 2018, White earned 1 NCAA Division I All-American award and won 6 individual Mid-Eastern Athletic Conference titles.

In 2017, White earned 2 NCAA Division I All-American awards and won 3 individual Mid-Eastern Athletic Conference titles.

In 2016, White won 3 individual Mid-Eastern Athletic Conference titles in the 60 m hurdles, 100 m hurdles and 4 × 100 m relay.

At North Carolina A&T, White earned All-MEAC academic awards.

== Early life ==
From Miami, Florida, White was a dancer before trying athletics in High School. She went to Miami Southridge Senior High School before attending North Carolina A&T State University between 2015 and 2019. White won 2014 FHSAA 4A District 14 Championships and placed 5th in FHSAA Region 4 championships in 100 meters in 12.13w. White won 2013 FHSAA 4A District 14 Championships 100 meters in 12.83.

== Personal life ==
From 2021 to 2023, White coached track and field at University of Tennessee in Knoxville.

== Statistics ==
Representing the United States
Year	Competition	Venue	Position	Event	Notes
2023	World Championships	Budapest, Hungary	9th	200 m	22.34
2025	World Relays	Guangzhou, China	4th	4 × 100 m relay	42.38

Grand Slam Track results
Slam	Race group	Event	Pl.	Time	Prize money
2025 Miami Slam	Short sprints	100 m	7th	11.08	US$12,500
2025 Miami Slam	Short sprints	200 m	6th	22.85	US$12,500
