= Jasmine Jones =

American athlete (born 2001)

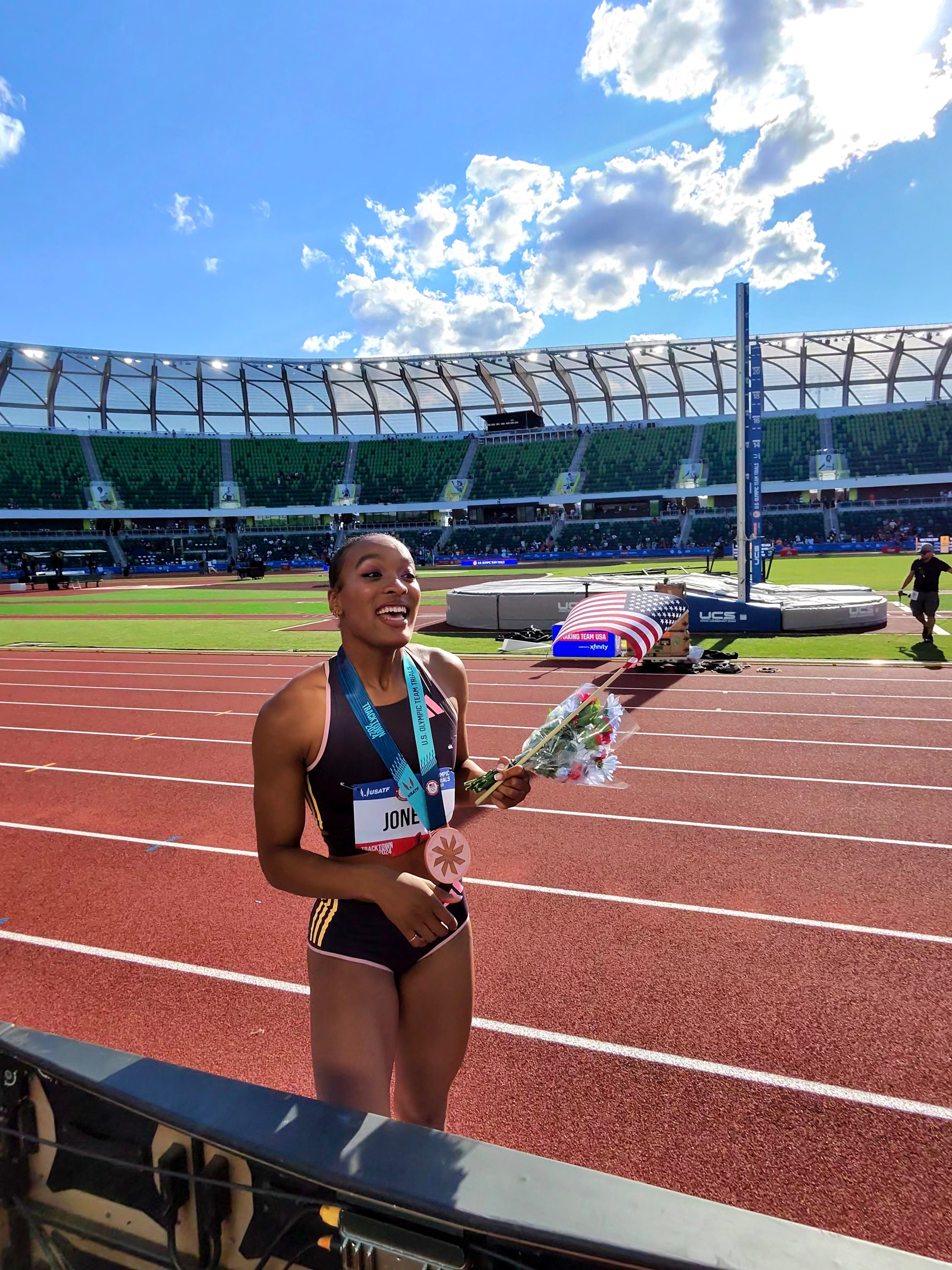
- Jones at the 2024 U.S. Olympic Trials

Personal information
- Full name: Jasmine Mari Jones
- Born: November 30, 2001 (age 24) Atlanta, Georgia, U.S.
- Height: 5 ft 11 in (180 cm)

Sport
- Sport: Athletics
- Event: Hurdles

Achievements and titles
- Personal bests: 60 m hurdles: 7.77 (Boston, 2024); 100 m hurdles: 12.64 (Eugene, 2024); 400 m hurdles 52.08 (Tokyo, 2025)
Medal record
Women's athletics
Representing United States
World Championships
Silver medal – second place	2025 Tokyo	400 m hurdles
World Ultimate Championship
First place	2026 Budapest	400 m hurdles
Pan American U20 Championships
Gold medal – first place	2019 San José	100 m hurdles

Jasmine Mari Jones (born November 30, 2001) is an American track and field athlete. In 2026, she won the 400 m hurdles at the inaugural World Ultimate Championship. She was the silver medalist at the 2025 World Championships and competed at the 2024 Summer Olympics, finishing fourth in the final.

Jones previously won the gold medal at the 2019 Pan American U20 Championships in the 100 m hurdles and was runner-up in the 60 m hurdles at the 2024 USA Indoor Track and Field Championships.

== Early life ==
Daughter of Henry Jones, an NFL All-Pro safety for the Buffalo Bills from 1991 to 2000, and Joanna Cox Jones, an NCAA D1 sprinter, Jones attended Greater Atlanta Christian School and won a national age-group title, over 400 m hurdles, in 2016. She was named the Georgia female track and field athlete of the year in 2019.

== Career ==
=== Early career ===
Jones won gold in the 100 m hurdles at the 2019 USATF U20 Outdoor Championships in Miramar, Florida in June. She then won gold in the same event at the 2019 Pan American U20 Athletics Championships in San Jose, Costa Rica in July 2019.

Jones ran track at college for USC Trojans with whom she claimed an NCAA Outdoors title in the 4 × 100 m relay in her first year of 2021. The following year, she was runner-up in the NCAA Outdoors 100 m hurdles in a personal best time of 12.66 seconds.

=== 2024: Olympic debut ===
Jones finished as runner-up in the 60 m hurdles at the US National Indoors Championships in New Mexico in February 2024, running a personal best time of 7.82 seconds. Competing at the NCAA Indoor Championships in Boston, Massachusetts, she won the 60 metres hurdles final in a personal best time of 7.77 seconds.

She won the 400 m hurdles at the NCAA Championships in Eugene, Oregon in June 2024 in 53.15 seconds. Later that month, she ran a personal best 52.77 seconds to finish third in the 400 metres hurdles at the US Olympic trials.

Jones placed fourth at the 2024 Olympic Games in the 400 m hurdles with a time of 52.29 seconds, which was a personal best as well as a US collegiate record.

=== 2025: World Championships silver medalist ===
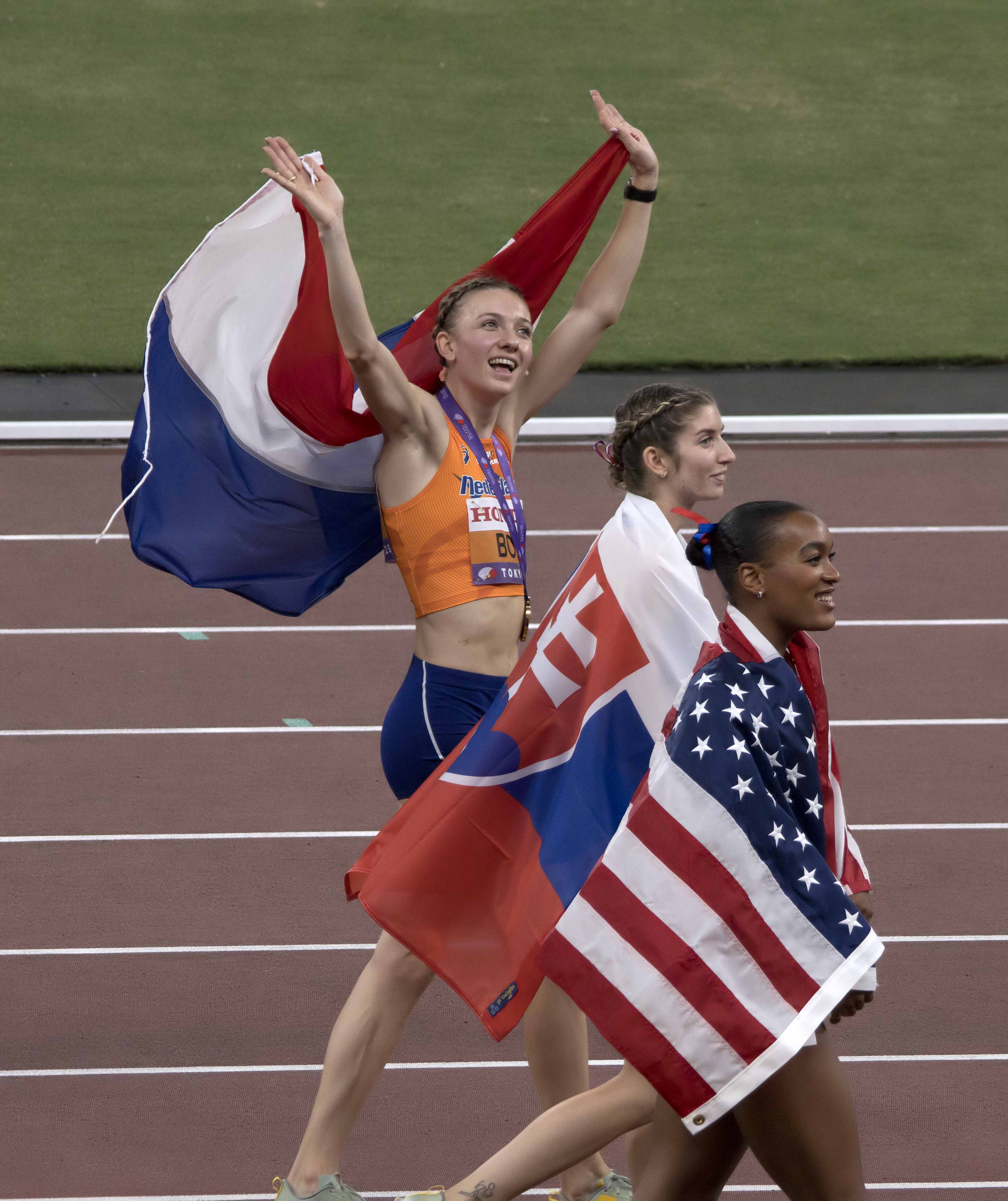
Jones (front) after the 2025 World Athletics Championships 400 m hurdles final.

Announced for the inaugural season of the Michael Johnson founded Grand Slam Track, She was the slam winner at the 2025 Philadelphia Slam in the long hurdles category after finishing second in both the 400 metres hurdles and 400 metres races. She ran 53.18 seconds to finish second to Femke Bol in the 400 metres hurdles at the 2025 London Athletics Meet, part of the 2025 Diamond League, on July 19.

She placed third in the final of the 400 metres hurdles at the 2025 USA Outdoor Track and Field Championships. She also placed third in the 400 metres hurdles on August 16 in the Diamond League at the 2025 Kamila Skolimowska Memorial, in Poland.

Jones was selected for the American team for the 2025 World Athletics Championships in Tokyo, Japan, winning the silver medal in the 400 metres hurdles, running a personal best time of 52.08 seconds.

=== 2026: Ultimate champion ===
On 10 July 2026, Jones ran a personal best of 51.09 seconds for the 400 metres flat at the 2026 Herculis event in Monaco, part of the 2026 Diamond League. On 14 July, she won over 400 metres hurdles in 52.91 seconds at the István Gyulai Memorial, in Budapest. Competing at the inaugural World Ultimate Championship in Budapest on 13 September, Jones won the 400 m hurdles in a season's best time of 52.45 seconds for the first major international title of her career.

== Competition results ==
=== International championships ===
Representing the United States
Year	Competition	Venue	Position	Event	Result
2019	Pan American U20 Championships	San José, Costa Rica	1st	100 m hurdles	13.20
2024	Olympic Games	Paris, France	4th	400 m hurdles	52.29
2025	World Championships	Tokyo, Japan	2nd	400 m hurdles	52.08
2026	World Ultimate Championship	Budapest, Hungary	1st	400 m hurdles	52.45

=== National championships ===
Year	Competition	Venue	Position	Event	Time
2021	NCAA Division I Indoor Championships	Fayetteville, Arkansas	− (h)	60 m hurdles	DNF
2021	NCAA Division I Outdoor Championships	Eugene, Oregon	11th	100 m hurdles	12.94
2021	NCAA Division I Outdoor Championships	Eugene, Oregon	1st	4 × 100 m relay	42.82
2021	U.S. Olympic Trials	Eugene, Oregon	− (h)	100 m hurdles	DNF
2022	NCAA Division I Indoor Championships	Birmingham, Alabama	3rd (h)^{1}	60 m hurdles	7.93
2022	NCAA Division I Indoor Championships	Birmingham, Alabama	4th	4 × 400 m relay	3:33.03
2022	NCAA Division I Outdoor Championships	Eugene, Oregon	2nd	100 m hurdles	12.66
2022	NCAA Division I Outdoor Championships	Eugene, Oregon	10th	4 × 100 m relay	43.32
2022	NCAA Division I Outdoor Championships	Eugene, Oregon	16th	4 × 400 m relay	3:35.52
2023	NCAA Division I Indoor Championships	Albuquerque, New Mexico	4th	4 × 400 m relay	3:28.58
2024	U.S. Indoor Championships	Albuquerque, New Mexico	2nd	60 m hurdles	7.78
2024	NCAA Division I Indoor Championships	Boston, Massachusetts	1st	60 m hurdles	7.77
2024	NCAA Division I Indoor Championships	Boston, Massachusetts	2nd	4 × 400 m relay	3:27.62
2024	NCAA Division I Outdoor Championships	Eugene, Oregon	4th	100 m hurdles	12.64
2024	NCAA Division I Outdoor Championships	Eugene, Oregon	1st	400 m hurdles	53.15
2024	U.S. Olympic Trials	Eugene, Oregon	3rd	400 m hurdles	52.77
2025	U.S. Championships	Eugene, Oregon	3rd	400 m hurdles	53.23

^{1} Did not start in the final

=== Circuit performances ===
Grand Slam Track results
Slam	Race group	Event	Pl.	Time	Prize money
2025 Philadelphia Slam	Long hurdles	400 m hurdles	2nd	54.65	US$100,000
2025 Philadelphia Slam	Long hurdles	400 m	2nd	52.73	US$100,000
