= Cambrea Sturgis =

American sprinter

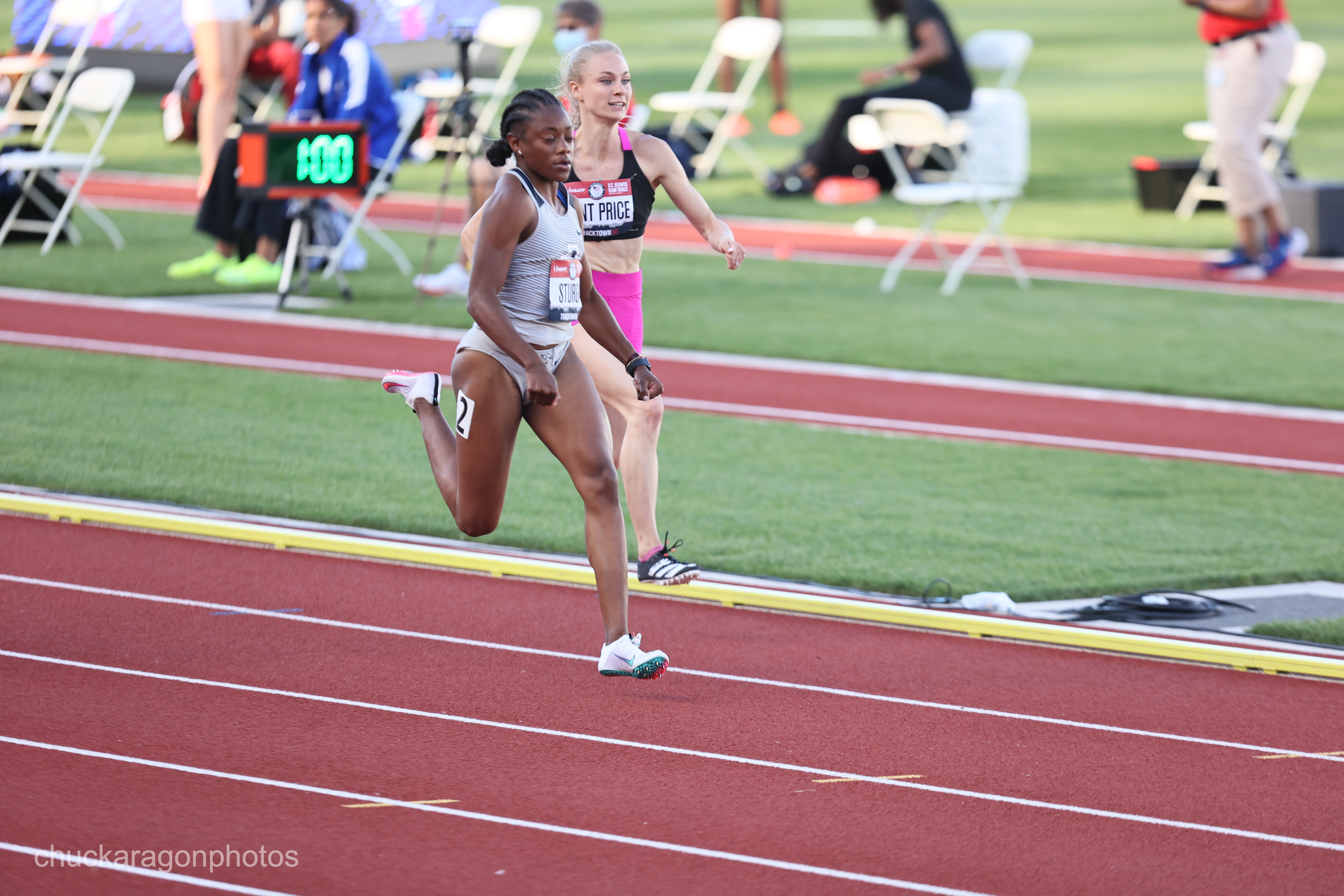
- Sturgis in 2021

Personal information
- Nationality: American
- Born: March 27, 1999 (age 27)
- Height: 4 ft 11 in (150 cm)

Sport
- Country: United States
- Sport: Track and field
- Event: Sprints
- College team: North Carolina A&T Aggies
- Club: Adidas
- Turned pro: 2021

Achievements and titles
- Personal bests: 60 m: 7.15i (2020); 100 m: 10.87 (2022); 200 m: 21.93 (2026)

Cambrea Sturgis (born March 27, 1999) is an American professional track and field athlete specializing in the sprints. She won two national titles in 2021, winning the 100 m and the 200 m at the NCAA Division I Outdoor Championships as a sophomore.

== Early life ==
Sturgis grew up in Kannapolis, North Carolina, where her first sport was basketball. She began running track in middle school, following in the footsteps of her father, Darius. Sturgis initially struggled, finishing last in races, but improved after joining an Amateur Athletic Union club called the Salisbury Speedsters.

Sturgis graduated from A.L. Brown High School in Kannapolis, North Carolina. She was one of the fastest 100 m and 200 m sprinters in the state by her sophomore year, earning MecKa 4A Conference female track athlete of the year accolades. She was the Cabarrus County and 4A West Region champion in both events that year, placing top-three at the 4A state meet with respective times of 11.73 and 24.04 seconds. Sturgis repeated as 4A West Region champion in the 200 m as a junior, but did not compete as a senior.

Sturgis was discovered as a sophomore by North Carolina A&T State University head coach Duane Ross, who said: "Mechanically, she has the tools. She is wired the correct way for a sprinter. I knew she had a future in this sport, and as soon as I could, I started recruiting her." Sturgis also received offers from programs such as LSU, Georgia, Iowa, Minnesota and Western Carolina.

== College career ==
Sturgis competed at the NCAA Division I level for the North Carolina A&T Aggies. As a freshman, she broke the 200 m school record with a winning time of 23.43 seconds at the 2019 Hokie Invitational. Sturgis also finished third in the 200 m at the 2019 NCAA Division I Outdoor Championships with a personal best time of 22.40 seconds. She was named a first-team All-American by the U.S. Track and Field Cross Country Coaches Association (USTFCCCA).

Sturgis won her first conference title as a sophomore, taking the 200 m crown at the 2020 MEAC Indoor Championships to contribute to the Aggies' fourth straight indoor team title. She also ran a personal best time of 7.15 seconds in the 60 m to set a meet record at the Jim Green Invitational, earning national female athlete of the week honors by the USTFCCCA. In the spring season, Sturgis won the 100 m, 200 m, and 4 × 100 m events at the 2021 MEAC Outdoor Championships, leading the Aggies to a conference title with 290 points. She was again named national female athlete of the week by the USTFCCCA for her performance.

Sturgis won the sprint double the following month at the 2021 NCAA Division I Outdoor Championships, winning the 100 m event in 10.74 seconds before placing first in the 200 m with a personal best time of 22.12 seconds. The former became the fastest wind aided 100 m time in NCAA history while the latter was the fourth-fastest 200 m performance in NCAA history. She also anchored the 4 × 100 m team to a third-place finish with a school-record time of 43.03 seconds. Sturgis competed at the U.S. Olympic Trials in the 100 m and 200 m events, but was eliminated in the semi-finals in both races. She was named the 2021 Southeast Region Women's Track Athlete of the Year by the USTFCCCA.

== Professional career ==
On July 4, 2021, Sturgis announced that she would be foregoing her remaining college eligibility and pursuing a professional career with Adidas.

On April 23, 2022, Sturgis ran a world-leading time of 10.87 seconds to win the 100 m event at the Aggie Classic, improving on Elaine Thompson-Herah's mark of 10.89 from the week before.

== Achievements ==
All information taken from World Athletics profile.

=== Personal bests ===
Type	Distance	Time (s)	Wind (m/s)	Venue	Date	Notes
Individual events
Indoor	60 metres	7.15	—N/a	Lexington, United States	11 January 2020	
Indoor	200 metres sh	23.02	—N/a	Fayetteville, United States	15 February 2020	
Indoor	300 metres sh	37.71	—N/a	Blacksburg, United States	24 January 2020	
Outdoor	100 metres	10.87	+1.8	Greensboro, United States	23 April 2022	
Outdoor	200 metres	21.93	+1.7	Nairobi, Kenya	24 April 2026	
Outdoor	400 metres	56.47	—N/a	High Point, United States	23 March 2019	
Team events
Indoor	4 × 400 metres relay Sh	3:35.97	—N/a	Fayetteville, United States	15 February 2020	
Outdoor	4 × 100 metres relay	42.56	—N/a	Austin, United States	1 April 2023	
Outdoor	4 × 400 metres relay	3:37.30	—N/a	Des Moines, United States	24 April 2021	

=== International competitions ===
Representing the United States
Year	Competition	Venue	Position	Event	Time	Notes
2026	World Ultimate Championship	Budapest, Hungary	12th (sf)	100 m	11.21	
2026	World Ultimate Championship	Budapest, Hungary	6th	200 m	22.46	

=== National championships and competitions ===
Year	Competition	Venue	Position	Event	Time	Notes
2019	NCAA Division I Championships	Austin, Texas	11th (sf)	100 m	11.22	
2019	NCAA Division I Championships	Austin, Texas	3rd	200 m	22.40	
2019	NCAA Division I Championships	Austin, Texas	6th	4 × 100 m relay	43.09	
2021	NCAA Division I Championships	Eugene, Oregon	1st	100 m	10.74	
2021	NCAA Division I Championships	Eugene, Oregon	1st	200 m	22.21	PB CL
2021	NCAA Division I Championships	Eugene, Oregon	3rd	4 × 100 m relay	43.03	
2021	U.S. Olympic Trials	Eugene, Oregon	10th (sf)	100 m	11.05	
2021	U.S. Olympic Trials	Eugene, Oregon	11th (sf)	200 m	22.68	
2022	USA Indoor Championships	Spokane, Washington	5th	60 m	7.18	
2022	USA Championships	Eugene, Oregon	13th (sf)	100 m	11.04	
2022	USA Championships	Eugene, Oregon	4th	200 m	22.16	
2023	USA Championships	Eugene, Oregon	18th (h)	100 m	11.22	
2023	USA Championships	Eugene, Oregon	19th (h)	200 m	23.09	
2024	U.S. Olympic Trials	Eugene, Oregon	23rd (sf)	100 m	11.35	
2024	U.S. Olympic Trials	Eugene, Oregon	18th (sf)	200 m	22.98	
2025	USA Championships	Eugene, Oregon	17th (sf)	100 m	11.28	
2025	USA Championships	Eugene, Oregon	11th (sf)	200 m	22.66	
2026	USA Championships	New York, New York	2nd	200 m	22.22	
