= Courtney Lindsey =

American athlete (born 1998)

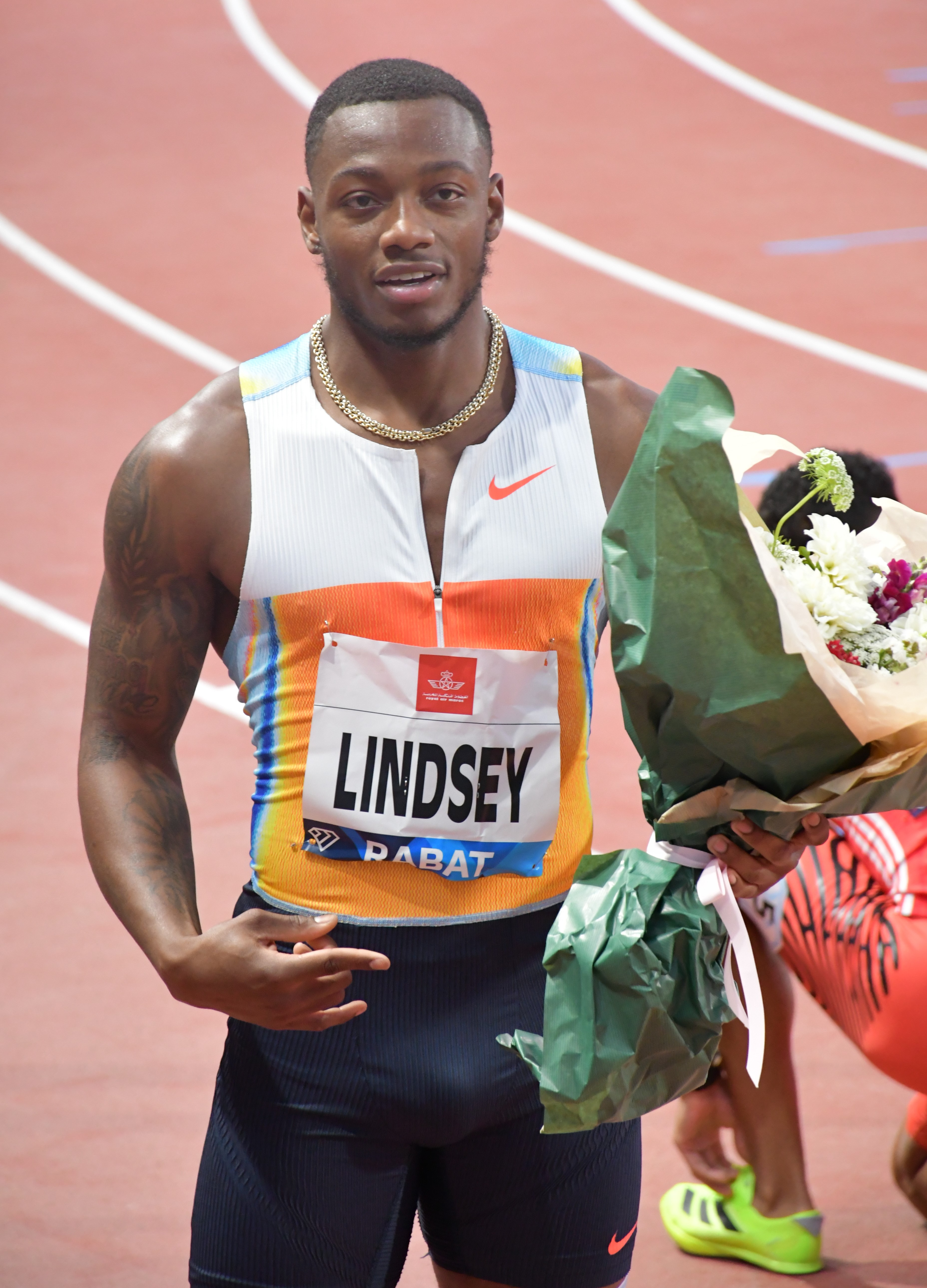
- Lindsey at the 2025 Meeting International Mohammed VI d'Athlétisme de Rabat.

Personal information
- Nationality: United States
- Born: November 18, 1998 (age 27) Rock Island, Illinois, U.S.
- Employer: Nike
- Height: 5 ft 10 in (178 cm)

Sport
- Sport: Athletics
- Event: Sprint

Achievements and titles
- Personal bests: 100 m: 9.82 (Eugene, 2025); 200 m 19.71 (Nairobi, 2024)
Medal record
Men's athletics
Representing the United States
World Championships
Gold medal – first place	2025 Tokyo	4 × 100 m relay
World Ultimate Championship
First place	2026 Budapest	4 × 100 m mixed
Third place	2026 Budapest	200 m
World Relays
Gold medal – first place	2024 Nassau	4 × 100 m relay
Silver medal – second place	2025 Guangzhou	4 × 100 m relay
Bronze medal – third place	2026 Gaborone	4 × 100 m mixed

Courtney Lindsey (born November 18, 1998) is an American track and field athlete who competes as a sprinter.

== Early life ==
Born and raised in Rock Island, Illinois, he attended Rock Island High School. He used to train at a boxing gym in the Quad Cities operated by his step father. Lindsey began his collegiate career at Iowa Central Community College. In July 2019, he signed a letter of intent to transfer to Texas Tech University.

== Career ==
=== 2023 ===
In June 2023, competing for Texas Tech University, he ran a new personal best time of 10.02 in the heats of the NCAA Outdoor Championship in the 100 m event in Austin, Texas. He then triumphed in the final, running a new personal best time of 9.89 seconds. Although, his 4 × 100 m relay team was disqualified at the same event, he ran another new personal best of 19.86s to finish runner-up in the 200m race.

Competing at the 2023 USA Outdoor Track and Field Championships, in Eugene, Oregon, he reached the semi-finals of the 100 m competition. In the 200 metres, he beat Fred Kerley and Christian Coleman, amongst others, to finish in third place in the final in a new personal best time of 19.85 seconds.

In July 2023, he made his debut in a Diamond League event, finishing seventh in Monaco in the 100 metres. He was selected for the 2023 World Athletics Championships in Budapest in August 2023. Competing in the 200m in Budapest he qualified for the semi-finals where he ran 20.22, missing out on a spot in the final by 1 hundredth of a second to Joseph Fahnbulleh.

=== 2024 ===
On 20 April 2024, he lowered his 200 m personal best to 19.71 seconds at high altitude at the Kip Keino Classic in Nairobi, Kenya, setting a new track record which as of 10 September 2024 he holds jointly with Letsile Tebogo of Botswana. He was selected to be part of the American team for the 2024 World Athletics Relays, taking place in Nassau, Bahamas in May 2024. On 10 May 2024, he finished runner-up in the 200 metres at the 2024 Doha Diamond League. He followed that with the runner-up spot at the 2024 Prefontaine Classic.

He competed in the United States men's 4 × 100 metres relay team at the 2024 Paris Olympics.

=== 2025 ===
Lindsey was invited as a challenger to the inaugural 2025 Grand Slam Track meeting in Jamaica. He placed 5th in the 100 m race there on April 4. On 24 April 2025, he was named in the American team for the 2025 World Athletics Relays in Guangzhou, China in May 2025. He ran as part of the men's 4 × 100 m relay team which won their heat and qualified a team for the World Championships before finishing in second place overall. In May 2025, he finished second in the 200 metres race at the 2025 Doha Diamond League 0.01 seconds behind reigning Olynpic champion Letsile Tebogo. The following week he ran 20.04 seconds (0.4 m/s) to win the 200 metres at the 2025 Meeting International Mohammed VI d'Athlétisme de Rabat, also part of the 2025 Diamond League. He ran 19.87 seconds to place second in the 200 metres at the 2025 Prefontaine Classic.

He reached the semi-finals of the 100 metres at the 2025 USA Outdoor Track and Field Championships, winning his heat in 10.05 seconds ahead of Christian Coleman and Brandon Hicklin. After winning his semi-final the following day, he lowered his personal best in the final to 9.82 seconds as he ran to a second place finish behind Kenny Bednarek. At the same championships, he reached the final of the 200 metres, placing fourth overall.

In September 2025, he was a semi-finalist in the 100 metres at the 2025 World Championships in Tokyo, Japan. He also ran in the men's 200 metres, reaching the semi-finals and won a gold medal in the men's 4 × 100 metres relay at the championships.

=== 2026 ===
Lindsey was named in the United States team for the 2026 World Athletics Relays in Gaborone, Botswana, winning the bronze medal behind Jamaica and Canada in the mixed 4 × 100 metres relay. On 7 June, he placed third in 20.24 seconds in the 200 metres at the 2026 Diamond League event in Stockholm. On 4 July, Lindsay ran a season’s best 20.19 seconds to place fourth over 200 metres at the 2026 Prefontaine Classic. He ran 9.93 seconds (+1.9) for the 100 metres on 10 July in Memphis, Tennessee at the Ed Murphey Classic. On 24 July, Lindsey ran 9.97 seconds to place fifth in the 100 m at the 2026 USA Championships. At the 2026 Diamond League Final in Brussels in September, he placed fifth over 200 metres. On 11 September, she was part of the winning American mixed 4 × 100 metres relay team at the inaugural 2026 World Athletics Ultimate Championship in Budapest, alongside Kayla White, Anavia Battle and Ronnie Baker. On the final day of the championship, he placed third overall in the 200 metres final in a season's best 19.79 seconds.

== Statistics ==
Grand Slam Track results
Slam	Race group	Event	Pl.	Time	Prize money
2025 Kingston Slam	Short sprints	100 m	5th	10.25	US$15,000
2025 Kingston Slam	Short sprints	200 m	6th	20.62	US$15,000
