= Rachel Dincoff =

American athlete (born 1993)

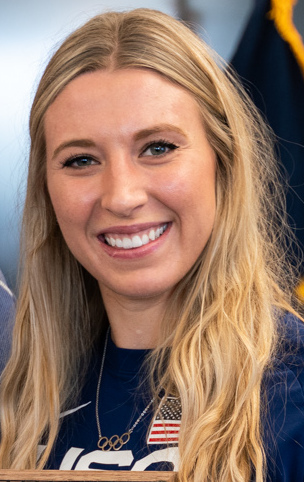
- Dincoff in 2021

Personal information
- Nationality: American
- Born: Rachel Dincoff; 24 December 1993 (age 31)

Sport
- Sport: Track and Field
- Event: Discus

Rachel Dincoff (born 24 December 1993) is an American Olympic athlete who competes in discus and shot put.

== Early life ==
Dincoff was an All-American for Auburn University in women's track & field. She captured Second Team All-American honors in the shotput during the outdoor track & field season of 2014 by posting a 16.08m throw in the NCAA Outdoor Track & Field Championships. Dincoff coached at New Mexico State University.

== Career ==
On 20 May 2021 in Tucson, at the Tucson Elite Classic, Rachel Dincoff was second behind Jorinde van Klinken in the women's discus. With a PB of 64.41m, Dincoff was comfortably beyond the Olympic qualifying mark of 63.50.

On 19 June 2021 at the 2020 United States Olympic Trials (track and field) she came third in the discus to finish behind Valarie Allman and Micaela Hazlewood. As she had already thrown the Olympic qualifying standard she was assured of her place at the delayed Olympic Games. At the 2020 Summer Games discus event Dincoff threw 56.22 to finish twelfth in her qualification group.

== Personal life ==
Dincoff and defensive end Carl Lawson began a relationship after meeting at Auburn University.
