= 2026 World Athletics Ultimate Championship – Men's 200 metres =

Men's 200 metres at the 2026 World Athletics Ultimate Championship
- Venue: National Athletics Centre
- Location: Budapest, Hungary
- Dates: 13 September 2026 (semi-finals & final)
- Competitors: 16 from 11 nations
- Winning time: 19.52 s

Champion
- Kenny Bednarek; United States

The men's 200 metres was held over two rounds at the 2026 World Athletics Ultimate Championship at the National Athletics Centre in Budapest, Hungary on 13 September 2026. It was the first time the World Ultimate Championship is held. Athletes qualified by wildcard or by their world ranking.

== Background ==
Global records before the 2026 World Athletics Ultimate Championship
Record	Time	Athlete (nation)	Location	Date
World record	19.19	Usain Bolt (JAM)	Berlin, Germany	20 August 2009
World lead	19.62	Kenny Bednarek (USA)	Zurich, Switzerland	27 August 2026
World lead	19.62	Kenny Bednarek (USA)	Brussels, Belgium	5 September 2026

Area records before the 2026 World Athletics Ultimate Championship
Record	Time	Athlete (nation)	Location	Date
African record	19.46	Letsile Tebogo (BOT)	Paris, France	8 August 2024
Asian record	19.88	Xie Zhenye (CHN)	London, United Kingdom	21 July 2019
European record	19.72	Pietro Mennea (ITA)	Mexico City, Mexico	12 September 1979
North, Central American, and Caribbean record	19.19	Usain Bolt (JAM)	Berlin, Germany	20 August 2009
Oceanian record	19.67	Gout Gout (AUS)	Sydney, Australia	12 April 2026
South American record	19.81	Alonso Edward (PAN)	Berlin, Germany	20 August 2009

== Qualification ==
For the 200 metres, sixteen athletes qualified, up to three by wildcard for winners of the event at the 2024 Summer Olympic, the 2025 World Athletics Championships, or the 2026 Diamond League final and the others by their position at the World Athletics Rankings for the event on 3 September 2026.

== Results ==
=== Semi-finals ===
The semi-finals were held on 11 September at 20:57 (UTC+2). First 4 of each heat (Q) qualified to the final.

==== Heat 1 ====
Place	Lane	Athlete	Nation	Time	Notes
1	5	Kenny Bednarek	United States	19.86	Q
2	9	Courtney Lindsey	United States	19.89	Q, SB
3	6	Letsile Tebogo	Botswana	19.96	Q
4	4	Udodi Onwuzurike	Nigeria	20.16	Q
5	8	José Figueroa	Puerto Rico	20.46	
6	2	Kyree King	United States	20.57	
7	3	Timothé Mumenthaler	Switzerland	20.61	
8	7	Alexander Ogando	Dominican Republic	20.64	
				Wind: (+0.1 m/s)	

==== Heat 2 ====
Place	Lane	Athlete	Nation	Time	Notes
1	7	Sinesipho Dambile	South Africa	19.80	Q
2	5	Andre De Grasse	Canada	19.87	Q
3	8	Bryan Levell	Jamaica	20.08 [.075]	Q
4	9	Aaron Brown	Canada	20.08 [.076]	Q
5	6	Makanakaishe Charamba	Zimbabwe	20.13	
6	3	Christopher Taylor	Jamaica	20.36	
7	4	Yassine Hssine	Morocco	20.37	
8	2	Brandon Hicklin	United States	20.49	
				Wind: (−0.2 m/s)	

=== Final ===
The final was held on 12 September at 20:18 (UTC+2).

Place	Lane	Athlete	Nation	Time	Notes
1st place, gold medalist(s)	6	Kenny Bednarek	United States	19.52	WL
2	5	Letsile Tebogo	Botswana	19.76	SB
3	4	Courtney Lindsey	United States	19.79	SB
4	8	Sinesipho Dambile	South Africa	19.91	
5	7	Andre De Grasse	Canada	19.92	
6	9	Bryan Levell	Jamaica	20.07	
7	3	Aaron Brown	Canada	20.23	
8	2	Udodi Onwuzurike	Nigeria	20.45	
				Wind: (−0.1 m/s)	
