= 2026 World Athletics Ultimate Championship – Mixed 4 × 100 metres relay =

Mixed 4 × 100 metres relay at the 2026 World Athletics Ultimate Championship
- Venue: National Athletics Centre
- Location: Budapest, Hungary
- Dates: 11 September 2026 (final)
- Competitors: 32 from 8 nations
- Winning time: 39.64

Champion
- United States (Ronnie Baker, Anavia Battle, Courtney Lindsey, Kayla White)

The mixed 4 × 100 metres relay was held as a straight final at the 2026 World Athletics Ultimate Championship at the National Athletics Centre in Budapest, Hungary on 11 September 2026. It was the first time the World Ultimate Championship is held. Teams qualified by competition placement or by their world ranking.

== Background ==
Global records before the 2026 World Athletics Ultimate Championship
Record	Time	Nation (athletes)	Location	Date
World record	39.62	Jamaica (Ackeem Blake, Tina Clayton, Kadrian Goldson, Tia Clayton)	Gaborone, Botswana	3 May 2026
World lead	39.62	Jamaica (Ackeem Blake, Tina Clayton, Kadrian Goldson, Tia Clayton)	Gaborone, Botswana	3 May 2026

Area records before the 2026 World Athletics Ultimate Championship
Record	Time	Athlete (nation)	Location	Date
African record	40.24	Nigeria (Favour Ashe, Obi Jennifer Chukwuka, Chidera Ezeakor, Maria Omokwe)	Gaborone, Botswana	2 May 2026
Asian record	40.55	China (Tan Mengyi, Yuan Qiqi, Lu Weiyi, Sui Gaofei)	Shaoxing, China	8 August 2025
European record	39.97	Great Britain (Jeremiah Azu, Dina Asher-Smith, Zharnel Hughes, Amy Hunt)	Birmingham, United Kingdom	16 August 2026
North, Central American, and Caribbean record	39.62	Jamaica (Ackeem Blake, Tina Clayton, Kadrian Goldson, Tia Clayton)	Gaborone, Botswana	3 May 2026
Oceanian record	40.78	Australia (Jai Gordon, Lakara Stallan, Calab Law, Chloe Mannix-Power)	Paris, France	28 June 2026
South American record	40.99	Brazil (Erik Cardoso, Gabriela Mourão, Jorge Vides, Ana Azevedo)	Lima, Peru	30 May 2026

== Qualification ==
For the mixed 4 × 100 metres relay, eight teams qualified, six by their finishing position at the 2026 World Relays, two by their position at the World Athletics Rankings for the event on 3 September 2026 and finally Hungary were awarded an entry due to being the host country.

== Results ==
=== Final ===
The final was held on 11 September at 19:08 (UTC+2).

Place	Lane	Nation	Athletes	Time	Notes
1st place, gold medalist(s)	9	United States	Ronnie Baker, Anavia Battle, Courtney Lindsey, Kayla White	39.64	PB
2	6	Jamaica	Ackeem Blake, Tina Clayton, Kadrian Goldson, Jonielle Smith	39.72	
3	7	Great Britain	Romell Glave, Imani Lansiquot, Jeremiah Azu, Success Eduan	40.26	
4	5	Canada	Eliezer Adjibi, Audrey Leduc, Brendon Rodney, Sade McCreath	40.34	
5	3	Spain	Guillem Crespí, María Isabel Pérez, Andoni Calbano, Jaël Bestué	40.65	
6	8	Germany	Kevin Kranz, Jolina Ernst, Robin Ganter, Sina Kammerschmitt	40.85	
7	2	Hungary	Krisztián Kalics, Boglárka Takács, Dominik Pázmándi, Zita Szentgyörgyi	41.21	PB
8	4	Netherlands	Elvis Afrifa, Britt de Blaauw, Xavi Mo-Ajok, Fenna Achterberg	41.31	
