= Carl Lawson =

American football player (born 1995)

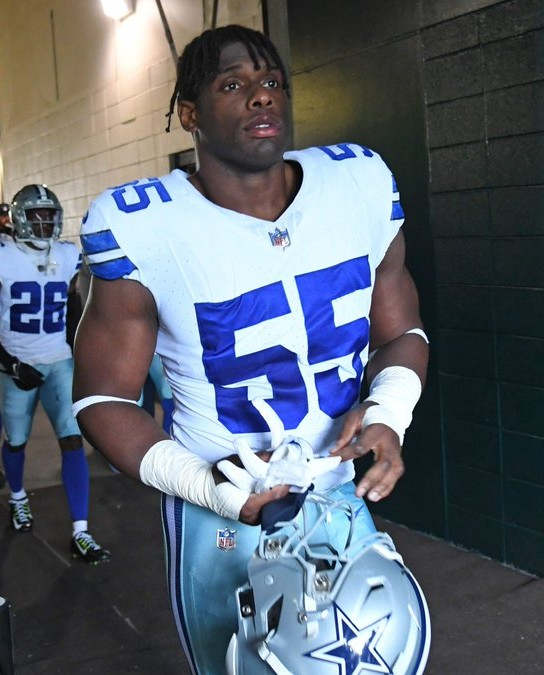
- Lawson with the Dallas Cowboys in 2024

No. 96 – Indianapolis Colts
- Position: Defensive end
- Roster status: Practice squad

Personal information
- Born: June 29, 1995 (age 31); Alpharetta, Georgia, U.S.
- Listed height: 6 ft 2 in (1.88 m)
- Listed weight: 260 lb (118 kg)

Career information
- High school: Milton (GA)
- College: Auburn (2013–2016)
- NFL draft: 2017: 4th round, 116th overall pick

Career history
- Cincinnati Bengals (2017–2020); New York Jets (2021–2023); Dallas Cowboys (2024); Baltimore Ravens (2025); Indianapolis Colts (2026–present)*
- * Offseason or practice squad member only

Awards and highlights
- PFWA All-Rookie Team (2017); First-team All-American (2016); First-team All-SEC (2016)

Career NFL statistics as of 2025
- Total tackles: 135
- Sacks: 32
- Forced fumbles: 4
- Fumble recoveries: 1
- Stats at Pro Football Reference

Carl Lawson (born June 29, 1995) is an American professional football defensive end for the Indianapolis Colts of the National Football League (NFL). He played college football for the Auburn Tigers.

== Early life ==
Lawson attended Milton High School in Milton, Georgia. He had 87 tackles and 15 sacks as a junior and 78 tackles and 27 sacks his senior year. Lawson was a consensus five-star recruit and was ranked among the top recruits in his class. He committed to Auburn University to play college football.

== College career ==
As a true freshman at Auburn in 2013, Lawson had 20 tackles and four sacks. He missed his sophomore year in 2014 due to a torn ACL. In 2015, Lawson played in only seven games in his junior season due to injuries, recording 17 tackles and one sack.

== Professional career ==
Pre-draft measurables
Height	Weight	Arm length	Hand span	40-yard dash	10-yard split	20-yard split	20-yard shuttle	Three-cone drill	Vertical jump	Broad jump	Bench press
6 ft 1 3/4 in (1.87 m)	261 lb (118 kg)	31 1/2 in (0.80 m)	10 3/8 in (0.26 m)	4.67 s	1.60 s	2.67 s	4.19 s	7.46 s	33.0 in (0.84 m)	9 ft 6 in (2.90 m)	35 reps
All values from NFL Combine

=== Cincinnati Bengals ===
Lawson was selected by the Cincinnati Bengals in the fourth round, 116th overall, in the 2017 NFL draft. He played in all 16 games with one start, recording 16 tackles and 8.5 sacks. His 8.5 sacks finished second on the team behind Geno Atkins' 9.0 and first among all rookies, earning him a spot on the Pro Football Writers of America All-Rookie Team.

In 2018, Lawson played in eight games before suffering a season-ending torn ACL in Week 8. He was placed on injured reserve on November 5, 2018.

=== New York Jets ===
On March 18, 2021, Lawson signed a three-year, $45 million contract with the New York Jets. On August 19, during a joint practice with the Green Bay Packers, Lawson went down with an apparent left leg injury. An MRI later confirmed that Lawson had suffered a ruptured Achilles tendon in his left leg, ending his 2021 season.

In 2022, he played in all 17 games and although he finished with 7 sacks and 49 quarterback pressures, he was not a consistent pass rush threat as he was with the Bengals.

In 2023, he struggled to get on the field after suffering a back injury in training camp. He appeared in 6 games and was declared inactive in 11 contests, while making 5 tackles and no sacks.

=== Dallas Cowboys ===
On August 19, 2024, Lawson signed with the Dallas Cowboys. He was acquired to provide depth at the defensive end position after Sam Williams was lost for the season with a knee injury suffered early in camp. He was released on August 27, and re-signed to the practice squad. He did not have a defined role in the defense until both Micah Parsons and DeMarcus Lawrence missed significant time after Week 4. He was promoted to the active roster on October 9. In the final 13 games he recorded 5 sacks, 30 quarterback pressures, 9 tackles, one pass defensed and one forced fumble.

=== Baltimore Ravens ===
On October 23, 2025, Lawson signed with the Baltimore Ravens' practice squad. He was released by the Ravens on December 9. He appeared in one game and had one tackle.

=== Indianapolis Colts ===
On October 7, 2026, Lawson signed with the Indianapolis Colts practice squad.

== Personal life ==
Lawson and Olympic discus thrower Rachel Dincoff began a relationship after meeting at Auburn University.

Lawson's grand-uncle is sprinter Carl Lawson, who was selected to represent Jamaica at the 1972 Summer Olympics.

== NFL career statistics ==
Legend
**Bold**	Career high

=== Regular season ===
Year	Team	Games		Tackles					Interceptions						Fumbles			
Year	Team	GP	GS	Cmb	Solo	Ast	Sack	Sfty	PD	Int	Yds	Avg	Lng	TD	FF	FR	Yds	TD
2017	CIN	16	1	16	10	6	**8.5**	0	0	0	0	0.0	0	0	0	0	0	0
2018	CIN	7	0	6	4	2	1.0	0	0	0	0	0.0	0	0	0	0	0	0
2019	CIN	12	2	23	17	6	5.0	0	0	0	0	0.0	0	0	0	0	0	0
2020	CIN	16	11	**36**	**18**	**18**	5.5	0	0	0	0	0.0	0	0	**2**	0	0	0
2021	NYJ	0	0	Did not play due to injury														
2022	NYJ	**17**	**17**	33	**18**	15	7.0	0	0	0	0	0.0	0	0	1	**1**	**2**	0
2023	NYJ	6	0	5	2	3	0.0	0	0	0	0	0.0	0	0	0	0	0	0
Career		74	31	119	69	50	27.0	0	0	0	0	0.0	0	0	3	1	2	0
