= 2026 World Athletics Ultimate Championship – Women's 200 metres =

Women's 200 metres at the 2026 World Athletics Ultimate Championship
- Venue: National Athletics Centre
- Location: Budapest, Hungary
- Dates: 13 September 2026 (semi-finals & final)
- Competitors: 16 from 10 nations
- Winning time: 21.47 s

Champion
- Melissa Jefferson-Wooden; United States

The women's 200 metres was held over two rounds at the 2026 World Athletics Ultimate Championship at the National Athletics Centre in Budapest, Hungary on 13 September 2026. It was the first time the World Ultimate Championship is held. Athletes qualified by wildcard or by their world ranking.

== Background ==
Global records before the 2026 World Athletics Ultimate Championship
Record	Time	Athlete (nation)	Location	Date
World record	21.34	Florence Griffith-Joyner (USA)	Seoul, South Korea	29 September 1988
World lead	21.51	Julien Alfred (LCA)	Fontvieille, Monaco	10 July 2026

Area records before the 2026 World Athletics Ultimate Championship
Record	Time	Athlete (nation)	Location	Date
African record	21.78	Christine Mboma (NAM)	Zurich, Switzerland	9 September 2021
Asian record	22.01	Li Xuemei (CHN)	Shanghai, China	22 October 1997
European record	21.63	Dafne Schippers (NED)	Beijing, China	28 August 2015
North, Central American, and Caribbean record	21.34	Florence Griffith-Joyner (USA)	Seoul, South Korea	29 September 1988
Oceanian record	22.23	Melinda Gainsford (AUS)	Stuttgart, Germany	13 July 1997
South American record	22.47	Vitoria Cristina Rosa (BRA)	Eugene, United States	19 July 2022

== Qualification ==
For the 200 metres, sixteen athletes qualified, up to three by wildcard for winners of the event at the 2024 Summer Olympic, the 2025 World Athletics Championships, or the 2026 Diamond League final and the others by their position at the World Athletics Rankings for the event on 3 September 2026.

== Results ==
=== Semi-finals ===
The semi-finals were held on 13 September at 18:44 (UTC+2). First 4 of each heat (Q) qualify to the final.

==== Heat 1 ====
Place	Lane	Athlete	Nation	Time	Notes
1	7	Gabby Thomas	United States	21.88	Q
2	6	Melissa Jefferson-Wooden	United States	22.15	Q
3	8	Kayla White	United States	22.28	Q
4	5	Fabienne Hoenke	Switzerland	22.72	Q
5	3	Rhasidat Adeleke	Ireland	22.81	
6	9	Liranyi Alonso	Dominican Republic	22.96	
7	2	Lavanya Williams	Jamaica	23.10	
—	4	Jenna Prandini	United States	DNS	
				Wind: (+0.7 m/s)	

==== Heat 2 ====
Place	Lane	Athlete	Nation	Time	Notes
1	6	Amy Hunt	Great Britain	22.22	Q
2	4	Ashanti Moore	Jamaica	22.30	Q, PB
3	5	Shaunae Miller-Uibo	Bahamas	22.39	Q
4	8	Cambrea Sturgis	United States	22.40	Q
5	7	Anavia Battle	United States	22.46	
6	9	Jaël Bestué	Spain	22.68	
7	2	Gémima Joseph	France	22.92	
8	3	Success Eduan	Great Britain	22.93	
9	1	Boglárka Takács	Hungary	23.24	
				Wind: (+0.2 m/s)	

=== Final ===
The final was held on 13 September at 20:49 (UTC+2).

Place	Lane	Athlete	Nation	Time	Notes
1st place, gold medalist(s)	6	Melissa Jefferson-Wooden	United States	21.47	WL, PB
2	8	Gabby Thomas	United States	21.77	
3	9	Kayla White	United States	21.93	
4	7	Amy Hunt	Great Britain	22.10	SB
5	5	Ashanti Moore	Jamaica	22.34	
6	4	Cambrea Sturgis	United States	22.46	
7	2	Anavia Battle	United States	22.54	
8	3	Fabienne Hoenke	Switzerland	22.74	
—	2	Shaunae Miller-Uibo	Bahamas	DNS	
				Wind: (−0.6 m/s)	
