= 2026 World Athletics Ultimate Championship – Women's 400 metres hurdles =

Women's 400 metres hurdles at the 2026 World Athletics Ultimate Championship
- Venue: National Athletics Centre
- Location: Budapest, Hungary
- Dates: 12 September 2026 (semi-finals); 13 September 2026 (final)
- Competitors: 17 from 12 nations
- Winning time: 52.45 s

Champion
- Jasmine Jones; United States

The women's 400 metres hurdles was held over two rounds at the 2026 World Athletics Ultimate Championship at the National Athletics Centre in Budapest, Hungary on 12 and 13 September 2026. It was the first time the World Ultimate Championship is held. Athletes qualified by wildcard or by their world ranking.

== Background ==
Global records before the 2026 World Athletics Ultimate Championship
Record	Time	Athlete (nation)	Location	Date
World record	50.37	Sydney McLaughlin-Levrone (USA)	Paris, France	8 August 2024
World lead	52.13	Anna Cockrell (USA)	Zurich, Switzerland	27 August 2026

Area records before the 2026 World Athletics Ultimate Championship
Record	Time	Athlete (nation)	Location	Date
African record	52.90	Nezha Bidouane (MAR)	Seville, Spain	25 August 1999
Asian record	53.09	Kemi Adekoya (BHR)	Budapest, Hungary	24 August 2023
European record	50.95	Femke Bol (NED)	La Chaux-de-Fonds, Switzerland	14 July 2024
North, Central American, and Caribbean record	50.37	Sydney McLaughlin-Levrone (USA)	Paris, France	8 August 2024
Oceanian record	53.17	Debbie Flintoff-King (AUS)	Seoul, South Korea	28 September 1988
South American record	52.66	Gianna Woodruff (PAN)	Tokyo, Japan	17 September 2025

== Qualification ==
For the 400 metres hurdles, seventeen athletes qualified, up to three by wildcard for winners of the event at the 2024 Summer Olympic, the 2025 World Athletics Championships, or the 2026 Diamond League final and the others by their position at the World Athletics Rankings for the event on 3 September 2026.

== Results ==
=== Semi-finals ===
The semi-finals were held on 12 September at 18:46 (UTC+2). First 4 of each heat (Q) qualified to the final.

==== Heat 1 ====
Place	Lane	Athlete	Nation	Time	Notes
1	7	Emma Zapletalová	Slovakia	52.93	Q
2	6	Gianna Woodruff	Panama	53.73	Q
3	9	Paulien Couckuyt	Belgium	53.81	Q
4	5	Rushell Clayton	Jamaica	53.84	Q
5	8	Fatoumata Binta Diallo	Portugal	53.90	
6	4	Ashley Miller	Zimbabwe	54.23	
7	2	Shamier Little	United States	54.53	
8	3	Louise Maraval	France	55.97	

==== Heat 2 ====
Place	Lane	Athlete	Nation	Time	Notes
1	5	Jasmine Jones	United States	52.77	Q, SB
2	7	Anna Cockrell	United States	53.31	Q
3	9	Sanique Walker	Jamaica	53.77	Q, PB
4	6	Dalilah Muhammad	United States	53.79	Q
5	8	Amalie Iuel	Norway	54.19	
6	4	Ayomide Folorunso	Italy	54.57	
7	3	Lina Nielsen	Great Britain	55.14	
8	2	Shiann Salmon	Jamaica	56.35	
9	1	Sára Mátó	Hungary	57.05	

=== Final ===
The final was held on 13 September at 18:08 (UTC+2).

Place	Lane	Athlete	Nation	Time	Notes
1st place, gold medalist(s)	5	Jasmine Jones	United States	52.45	SB
2	6	Emma Zapletalová	Slovakia	52.68	
3	7	Anna Cockrell	United States	53.09	
4	3	Dalilah Muhammad	United States	53.11	SB
5	9	Sanique Walker	Jamaica	53.61	PB
6	4	Paulien Couckuyt	Belgium	53.88	
7	8	Gianna Woodruff	Panama	53.89	
8	2	Rushell Clayton	Jamaica	54.32	
