= Micaela Hazlewood =

American athlete (born 1995)

Micaela Lewis
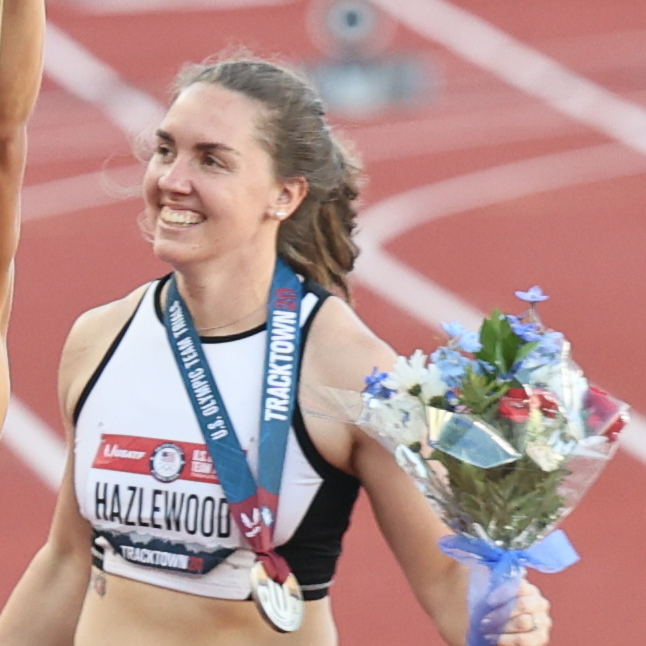

Personal information
- Nationality: United States
- Born: Micaela Hazlewood; 18 June 1995 (age 31)
- Home town: Columbus, Ohio
- Education: Purdue University '18; University of Kentucky '20; Master of Health Administration

Sport
- Sport: Athletics
- Event: Discus
- Turned pro: 2019

Achievements and titles
- Personal bests: Discus: 62.54 (Eugene, 2021)

Micaela Lewis (née Hazlewood born 18 June 1995) is an American track and field athlete. She finished second at the US National Championships in the discus in 2021.

== Early life ==
From Linton, Indiana, she attended Linton-Stockton High School before attending Purdue University. After graduating she transferred to the University of Kentucky, following former Purdue throws coach Keith McBride to Lexington. She was a SEC Silver Medalist in the shot put with a PB 16.51m in her last collegiate event on 22 February 2019.

== Career ==
On 19 June 2021 at the 2020 United States Olympic Trials (track and field) she threw a personal best 62.54m in the discus to finish second behind Valarie Allman and ahead of Rachel Dincoff. The result gave Hazlewood just 10 days to compete and meet or exceed the Olympic qualifying standard of 63.5 or she would not be able to go to Tokyo. She threw at the BAAA Bahamas National Championship on Saturday 26 June 2021, and the University of Michigan on 28 June without reaching the qualifying distance.

== Personal life ==
She is the daughter of Bob and Janet Hazlewood (née Pfefferkorn). In October 2020, Hazlewood married fellow Purdue alumnus Luke Lewis in Columbus, Ohio.
