= Anavia Battle =

American sprinter (born 1999)

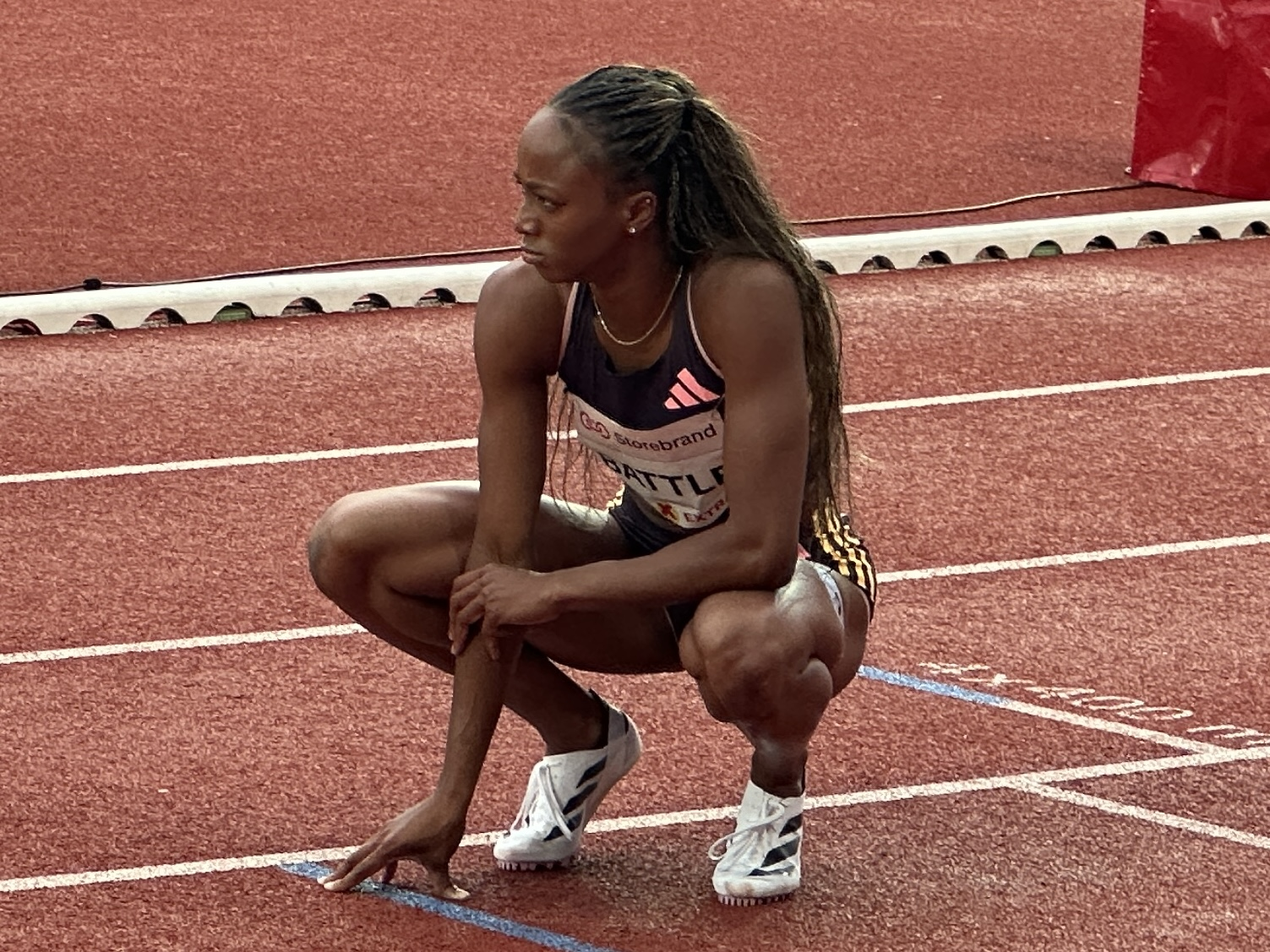
- Pictured at the Bislett Games in 2024

Personal information
- Born: March 28, 1999 (age 27) Inkster, Michigan, U.S.
- Height: 167.64 cm (5 ft 6 in)

Sport
- Country: United States
- Sport: Athletics
- Events: 100 m, 200 m
- College team: Ohio State Buckeyes
- Club: Adidas; Nov 2022-Present

Achievements and titles
- Personal bests: 100 m: 10.98 (Gainesville, 2025); 200 m: 21.95 (Eugene, 2021)
Medal record
Women's athletics
Representing United States
World Ultimate Championship
First place	2026 Budapest	4 × 100 m mixed

Anavia Battle (born March 28, 1999) is an American sprinter.

== Early life ==
From Inkster, Michigan, she was a graduate of Wayne Memorial High School (class of 2017). Battle was the 2021 Big Ten outdoor champion in both the 100 and 200 metres and ran a leg on the Big Ten champion 4 × 100 metres relay while at Ohio State. She finished third in the NCAA Division I 200 metres final in 2021.

== Career ==
At the US Olympic trials in Eugene, Oregon, Battle qualified for the U.S. women's Olympic team for the delayed 2020 Summer Olympics after finishing third in the 200 m race on June 26 with a new personal best time of 21.95 seconds. In Tokyo, she reached the semifinals of the woman's 200 metres.

She finished second at the 2024 Diamond League Shanghai over 200 metres, finishing behind Daryll Neita but ahead of Sha'Carri Richardson, in 22.99 seconds. In June 2024, she finished fourth in the 200 m at the 2024 BAUHAUS-galan Diamond League event in Stockholm.

She ran 22.41 seconds to win the 200 metres at the 2025 Xiamen Diamond League event in China, in April 2025. She secured a victory in the 200 m at the 2025 Shanghai Diamond League, in a season-best 22.38 seconds. She also won the 200 metres at the Diamond League event at the 2025 Golden Gala in Rome on 6 June 2025 and then won her fourth Diamond League event of the season when she ran 22.27 (0.9 m/s) to win at the 2025 Meeting de Paris on 20 June.

She reached the semi-finals of the 100 metres at the 2025 USA Outdoor Track and Field Championships, running her heat in 11.02 seconds (+3.2 m/s). Later at the championships she was runner-up to Melissa Jefferson-Wooden in a season's best 22.13 seconds in the women's 200 meters final. She placed fourth over 200 metres at the Diamond League Final in Zurich on 28 August.

In September 2025, she was a finalist in the 200 metres at the 2025 World Championships in Tokyo, Japan, placing fourth overall with a time of 22.22 seconds in the final.

Battle was a finalist in the 60 metres at the 2026 USA Indoor Track and Field Championships in New York. In May, she placed third over 200 metres at both the Shanghai and Xiamen Diamond League events. On 4 June, she placed third once again over 200 metres in the Diamond League, at the 2026 Golden Gala in Rome. On 24 July, she was a finalist at the 2026 USA Outdoor Track and Field Championships over 100 metres, placing fourth overall. At the 2026 Diamond League Final in Brussels in September, she placed fourth in the 200 metres. On 11 September, she was part of the winning American mixed 4 × 100 metres relay team at the inaugural 2026 World Athletics Ultimate Championship in Budapest, alongside Kayla White, Courtney Lindsey and Ronnie Baker. On 18 September, she placed third in the 200 metres at Athlos in London.

== Athletics achievements ==
Information from her World Athletics profile unless otherwise noted.

=== Personal bests ===
Type	Distance	Time (s)	Wind (m/s)	Venue	Date	Notes
Individual events
Indoor	60 metres	7.24	—N/a	Lexington, United States	29 January 2022	
Indoor	60 metres	7.24	—N/a	New York, United States	1 March 2026	
Indoor	200 metres sh	22.49	—N/a	Fayetteville, United States	18 February 2022	
Indoor	300 metres sh	37.08	—N/a	New York, United States	26 January 2019	
Outdoor	100 metres	10.98	+1.6	Gainesville, United States	19 April 2025	
Outdoor	200 metres	21.95	+1.3	Eugene, United States	26 June 2021	
Outdoor	300 metres	36.70	—N/a	Philadelphia, United States	30 April 2022	
Team events
Outdoor	4 × 100 metres relay	41.70	—N/a	Gainesville, United States	18 April 2026	
Outdoor	Mixed 4 × 100 metres relay	39.64	—N/a	Budapest, Hungary	11 September 2026	NBP
Outdoor	4 × 400 metres relay	3:26.59	—N/a	Austin, United States	29 March 2025	

=== International competitions ===
Representing the United States
Year	Competition	Venue	Position	Event	Time	Notes
2021	Olympic Games	Tokyo, Japan	16th (sf)	200 m	23.02	
2025	World Championships	Tokyo, Japan	4th	200 m	22.22	
2026	World Ultimate Championship	Budapest, Hungary	7th	200 m	22.54	
2026	World Ultimate Championship	Budapest, Hungary	1st	Mixed 4 × 100 m relay	39.64	PB

=== National championships and competitions ===
Year	Competition	Venue	Position	Event	Time	Notes
2018	USA U20 Championships	Bloomington, Indiana	8th	100 m	11.78	
2018	USA U20 Championships	Bloomington, Indiana	5th	200 m	23.37	
2019	NCAA Division I Indoor Championships	Birmingham, Alabama	5th	200 m sh	23.07	
2019	NCAA Division I Championships	Austin, Texas	14th (sf)	200 m	23.01	
2021	NCAA Division I Indoor Championships	Fayetteville, Arkansas	5th	200 m sh	22.76	
2021	NCAA Division I Championships	Eugene, Oregon	12th (sf)	100 m	11.43	
2021	NCAA Division I Championships	Eugene, Oregon	3rd	200 m	22.42	
2021	NCAA Division I Championships	Eugene, Oregon	17th (sf)	4 x 100 m relay	44.33	
2021	U.S. Olympic Trials	Eugene, Oregon	24th (h)	100 m	11.37	
2021	U.S. Olympic Trials	Eugene, Oregon	3rd	200 m	21.95	
2022	NCAA Division I Indoor Championships	Birmingham, Alabama	3rd	200 m sh	22.63	
2022	NCAA Division I Championships	Eugene, Oregon	22nd (sf)	100 m	11.43	
2022	NCAA Division I Championships	Eugene, Oregon	3rd	200 m	22.33	
2022	NCAA Division I Championships	Eugene, Oregon	6th	4 x 100 m relay	43.52	
2022	USA Championships	Eugene, Oregon	29th (h)	100 m	11.45	
2022	USA Championships	Eugene, Oregon	14th (sf)	200 m	22.72	
2023	USA Championships	Eugene, Oregon	13th (sf)	200 m	22.76	
2024	USA Indoor Championships	Albuquerque, New Mexico	10th (sf)	60 m	7.34	
2024	U.S. Olympic Trials	Eugene, Oregon	9th	100 m	11.12	
2024	U.S. Olympic Trials	Eugene, Oregon	10th (sf)	200 m	22.41	
2025	USA Championships	Eugene, Oregon	7th (h)	100 m	11.02	
2025	USA Championships	Eugene, Oregon	2nd	200 m	22.13	
2026	USA Indoor Championship	New York, New York	7th	60 m	7.28	
2026	USA Championships	New York, New York	4th	100 m	11.02	
