= István Gyulai =

Hungarian athletics administrator (1943–2006)

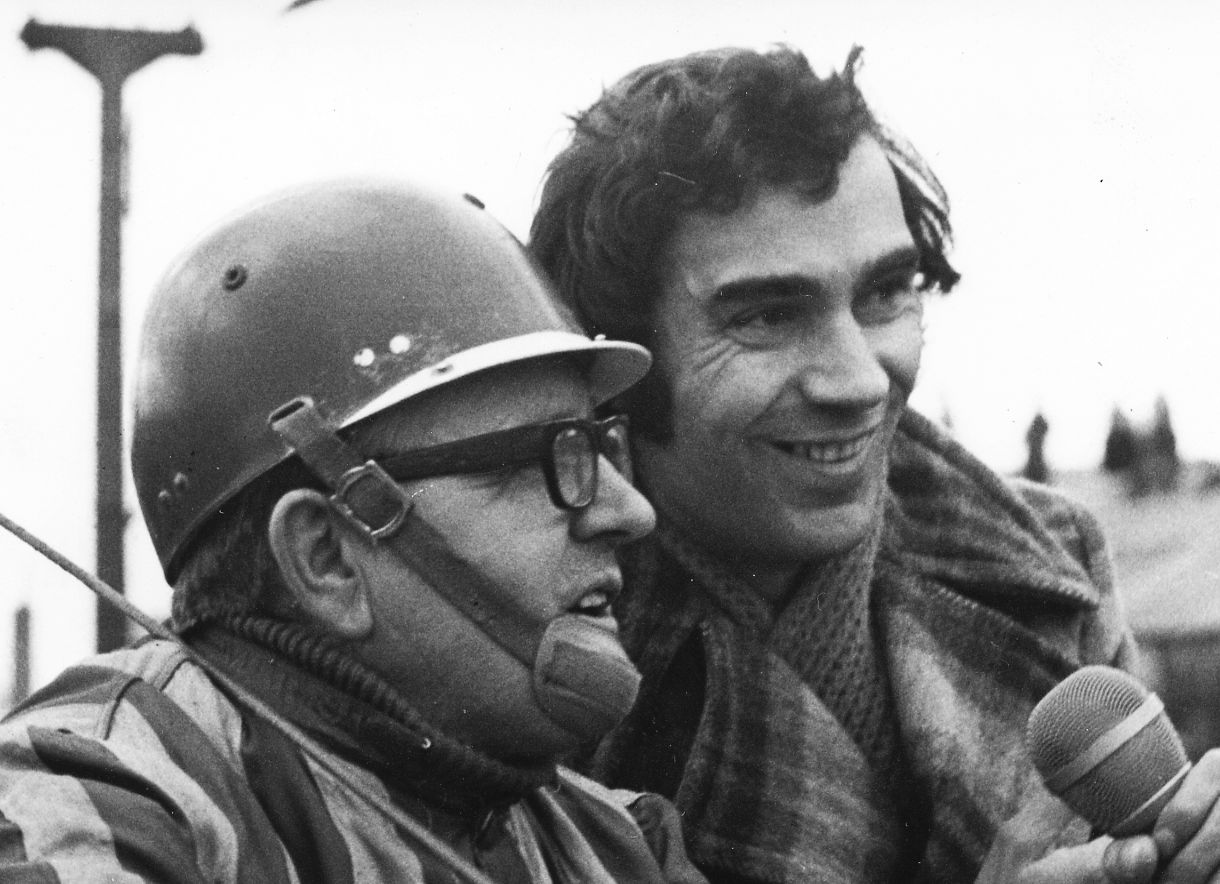
- Gyulai (right) in 1975

Personal information
- Born: 21 March 1943 Budapest, Hungary
- Died: 11 March 2006 (aged 62) Monte Carlo, Monaco

Sport
- Sport: Track and field
Medal record
Representing Hungary
Summer Universiade
Gold medal – first place	1963 Porto Alegre	4x100m relay
Silver medal – second place	1965 Budapest	4x400m relay

István Gyulai (21 March 1943 – 11 March 2006) was a former Hungarian television commentator and General Secretary of the IAAF and the AIPS.

A sprinter during his active athletics career, he was a 28-time national champion. He won two relay medals in two editions of the Universiade: a gold medal over 4 x 100 metres in 1963 and a silver medal over 4 x 400 metres in 1965. He participated in the 1964 Tokyo Olympics. He was part of the Budapest Honvéd sports club.

He started his television career in 1970 on Hungarian television. He led the sport section between 1990 and 1991.

He was a member of the IAAF Council from 1984 until 2001, and from 1991 until his death he was the General Secretary of the IAAF. During his years in the council, he still worked for the Hungarian Television as well. He was a key figure in helping Hungary host major athletics events; among the competitions held in the country were two editions of the IAAF World Indoor Championships, the 1994 IAAF World Cross Country Championships and the 1998 European Athletics Championships.

On 7 October 2006 the athletics stadium in Debrecen, Hungary was rededicated the István Gyulai Athletics Stadium in his honour. Five years after his death, the Gyulai István Memorial – Hungarian Athletics Grand Prix was launched in his honour, with his younger son Márton acting as meeting director.

His first wife, middle-distance runner Olga Kazi, also competed at the Olympics for Hungary. Both his sons followed his steps in sports. The elder, Miklós Gyulai, a sprinter who was national champion and ran the 4x100 relay on the 2000 Sydney Olympics and the 4x100 relay final on the 1999 World Championships, was also the founding member of the Hungarian bobsleigh team, competing in 1994, 1998 and 2002 Winter Olympics. His younger son, Márton Gyulai is a former pilot of the Hungarian bobsleigh team having driven both the 2-man and the 4-man sled in the 2006 Winter Olympics in Torino. The idea of the boys trying themselves out in bobsleigh came from their father and a close family friend, Andrew Frankl (father of Nicholas Frankl).

On the occasion of his 70th birthday, his biography "A Királynő Helytartója: Gyulai István életrajzi regénye" was published in Hungarian with 2500 copies available online.
