= 2026 World Athletics Ultimate Championship =

- Dates: 11–13 September 2026
- Host city: Budapest, Hungary
- Venue: National Athletics Centre (Budapest)
- Level: Senior
- Type: Outdoor
- Events: 28

The 2026 World Athletics Ultimate Championship was held at the National Athletics Centre in Budapest, Hungary, from 11 to 13 September 2026. Organised by World Athletics, it was an inaugural biennial invitational that featured top athletes in selected disciplines (including defending Olympic and world champions) competing for shares of a US$10 million purse.

== Qualification ==
The Ultimate Championship is a limited-field invitational, with individual track events limited to 16 entrants, and field events limited to eight entrants. Direct qualification slots are offered to:

- The gold medalist from the 2024 Summer Olympics.
- The gold medalist from the 2025 World Athletics Championships.
- The winner of the event at the 2026 Diamond League final.

The remainder of the field in each individual event will be determined by the World Athletics Rankings for the period from 2 September 2025 to 1 September 2026. There is no limit on how many athletes from a single country can be in the field for a single event.

For relay events, the 2026 World Athletics Relays served as the main qualifier, with the top six teams in its mixed 4 × 400 metres and mixed 4 × 100 metres events qualifying for the Ultimate Championship. Two more teams will qualify based on their performance during the competition period between 22 August 2025 to 1 September 2026. Only one team can qualify per-country in relays.

The following athletes have automatically qualified for the Ultimate Championship based on winning a gold medal at the 2024 Summer Olympics or 2025 world championships, or winning the Diamond League finals:

=== Men's ===
Event	2024 Olympic Champion	2025 World Champion	2026 Diamond League final winner
100 m	Noah Lyles; United States	Oblique Seville; Jamaica	
200 m	Letsile Tebogo; Botswana	Noah Lyles; United States	Kenny Bednarek; United States
400 m	Quincy Hall; United States	Collen Kebinatshipi; Botswana	
800 m	Emmanuel Wanyonyi; Kenya		
1500 m	Cole Hocker; United States	Isaac Nader; Portugal	Cameron Myers; Australia
5000 m	Jakob Ingebrigtsen; Norway	Cole Hocker; United States	Birhanu Balew; Bahrain
110 m hurdles	Grant Holloway; United States	Cordell Tinch; United States	Ja'Kobe Tharp; United States
400 m hurdles	Rai Benjamin; United States		Alison dos Santos; Brazil
High jump	Hamish Kerr; New Zealand		Mateusz Kołodziejski; Poland
Pole vault	Armand Duplantis; Sweden		Emmanouil Karalis; Greece
Long jump	Miltiadis Tentoglou; Greece	Mattia Furlani; Italy	Tajay Gayle; Jamaica
Hammer	Ethan Katzberg; Canada		—N/a
Javelin	Arshad Nadeem; Pakistan	Keshorn Walcott; Trinidad and Tobago	Rumesh Tharanga; Sri Lanka

=== Women's ===
Event	2024 Olympic Champion	2025 World Champion	2026 Diamond League final winner
100 m	Julien Alfred; Saint Lucia	Melissa Jefferson-Wooden; United States	Tina Clayton; Jamaica
200 m	Gabby Thomas; United States	Melissa Jefferson-Wooden; United States	Julien Alfred; Saint Lucia
400 m	Marileidy Paulino; Dominican Republic	Sydney McLaughlin-Levrone; United States	Marileidy Paulino; Dominican Republic
800 m	Keely Hodgkinson; Great Britain	Lilian Odira; Kenya	Audrey Werro; Switzerland
1500 m	Faith Kipyegon; Kenya		Klaudia Kazimierska; Poland
5000 m	Beatrice Chebet; Kenya		Freweyni Hailu; Ethiopia
100 m hurdles	Masai Russell; United States	Ditaji Kambundji; Switzerland	Masai Russell; United States
400 m hurdles	Sydney McLaughlin-Levrone; United States	Femke Bol; Netherlands	Anna Cockrell; United States
High jump	Yaroslava Mahuchikh; Ukraine	Nicola Olyslagers; Australia	Eleanor Patterson; Australia
Pole vault	Nina Kennedy; Australia	Katie Moon; United States	Hana Moll; United States
Long jump	Tara Davis-Woodhall; United States		Monae' Nichols; United States
Triple jump	Thea LaFond; Dominica	Leyanis Pérez; Cuba	Saly Sarr; Senegal
Javelin	Haruka Kitaguchi; Japan	Juleisy Angulo; Ecuador	Yan Ziyi; China

=== Wildcards ===
Additionally, several athletes received exceptional invitations to compete at the 2026 World Athletics Ultimate Championship. Among the international invitees were Josh Kerr (Great Britain) and Jakob Ingebrigtsen (Norway), who were both added to the men's 1500 metres. Their inclusion expanded the field to 13 athletes. Gianmarco Tamberi (Italy) was also granted an invitation in the men's high jump. As host nation, Hungary received exceptional invitations for Patrik Enyingi (400 m), Luca Kozák (100 m hurdles), Sára Mátó (400 m hurdles), Boglárka Takács (100 m and 200 m), as well as the Hungarian mixed 4 × 100 m and 4 × 400 m relay teams.

== Schedule ==
S	Semi-finals	F	Final

Men
Date →	11 Sep		12 Sep		13 Sep	
Event ↓	11 Sep		12 Sep		13 Sep	
100 m			S	F		
200 m					S	F
400 m	S		F			
800 m			S		F	
1500 m					F	
5000 m	F					
110 m hurdles	S	F				
400 m hurdles			S		F	
High jump					F	
Pole vault	F					
Long jump			F			
Hammer throw	F					
Javelin throw					F	

Women
Date →	11 Sep		12 Sep		13 Sep	
Event ↓	11 Sep		12 Sep		13 Sep	
100 m			S	F		
200 m					S	F
400 m	S		F			
800 m	S		F			
1500 m			F			
5000 m					F	
100 m hurdles	S	F				
400 m hurdles			S		F	
High jump	F					
Pole vault			F			
Long jump	F					
Triple jump					F	
Javelin throw			F			

Mixed
Date →	11 Sep	12 Sep	13 Sep
Event ↓	11 Sep	12 Sep	13 Sep
4 × 100 m relay	F		
4 × 400 m relay			F

Detailed event schedule
Day One—Friday, 11 September 7 PM
Track Events
Event	Division Round	Men / Women / Mixed
4 × 100 m relay	Final	mixed
400 m	Semi-finals	men
400 m	Semi-finals	women
100 m hurdles	Semi-finals	women
110 m hurdles	Semi-finals	men
5000 m	Final	men
800 m	Semi-finals	women
100 m hurdles	Final	women
110 m hurdles	Final	men
Field Events
High jump	Final	women
Hammer throw	Final	men
Pole vault	Final	men
Long jump	Final	women
Day Two—Saturday, 12 September 6 PM
Track Events
400 m	Final	women
400 m	Final	men
800 m	Semi-finals	men
400 m hurdles	Semi-finals	women
100 m	Semi-finals	women
100 m	Semi-finals	men
1500 m	Final	women
400 m hurdles	Semi-finals	men
800 m	Final	women
100 m	Final	women
100 m	Final	men
Field Events
Javelin throw	Final	women
Pole vault	Final	women
Long jump	Final	men
Day Three-Sunday, 13 September 6 PM
Track Events
400 m hurdles	Final	women
200 m	Semi-finals	men
400 m hurdles	Final	men
200 m	Semi-finals	women
5000 m	Final	women
800 m	Final	men
4 × 400 m relay	Final	mixed
1500 m	Final	men
200 m	Final	men
200 m	Final	women
Field Events
Javelin throw	Final	men
High jump	Final	men
Triple jump	Final	women

== Medal table ==
The following table is notional, 1st=gold, 2nd=silver and 3rd=bronze. The champion receiving a trophy as no medals were officially given with second and third place.

* Host nation (Hungary)

Rank	Nation	Gold	Silver	Bronze	Total
1	United States	10	7	10	27
2	Italy	2	0	0	2
3	Great Britain	1	4	1	6
4	Norway	1	1	2	4
5	Botswana	1	1	0	2
5	Greece	1	1	0	2
7	Switzerland	1	0	2	3
8	Ethiopia	1	0	1	2
8	Germany	1	0	1	2
8	Ukraine	1	0	1	2
11	Algeria	1	0	0	1
11	Brazil	1	0	0	1
11	Dominican Republic	1	0	0	1
11	Japan	1	0	0	1
11	Poland	1	0	0	1
11	Senegal	1	0	0	1
11	Sri Lanka	1	0	0	1
11	Sweden	1	0	0	1
19	Australia	0	3	1	4
20	Jamaica	0	2	1	3
21	Cuba	0	1	1	2
22	Bulgaria	0	1	0	1
22	Canada	0	1	0	1
22	China	0	1	0	1
22	Grenada	0	1	0	1
22	Hungary*	0	1	0	1
22	Nigeria	0	1	0	1
22	Saint Lucia	0	1	0	1
22	Slovakia	0	1	0	1
30	Netherlands	0	0	3	3
31	Colombia	0	0	1	1
31	Kenya	0	0	1	1
31	Mexico	0	0	1	1
31	Serbia	0	0	1	1
31	Trinidad and Tobago	0	0	1	1
Totals (35 entries)		28	28	29	85

== Results ==
In the World Athletics Ultimate Championship, medals are not awarded; instead the champion alone received a trophy in each event. Other participants received prize money according to their placings. The tables below show the top three finishers in each event.

=== Men ===
Event	Champion		Second		Third	
100 metres	Kenny Bednarek; United States	9.85 SB	Oblique Seville; Jamaica	9.90	Ronnie Baker; United States	9.93
200 metres	Kenny Bednarek; United States	19.52 WL	Letsile Tebogo; Botswana	19.76	Courtney Lindsey; United States	19.79
400 metres	Collen Kebinatshipi; Botswana	43.39 NR	Rai Benjamin; United States	44.15	Jereem Richards; Trinidad and Tobago	44.23
800 metres	Djamel Sedjati; Algeria	1:41.91	Marco Arop; Canada	1:42.28	Emmanuel Wanyonyi; Kenya	1:42.44
1500 metres	Josh Kerr; Great Britain	3:29.35	Cameron Myers; Australia	3:29.68	Hobbs Kessler; United States	3:30.73
5000 metres	Jakob Ingebrigtsen; Norway	12:59.24 SB	Cole Hocker; United States	13:00.05 SB	Parker Wolfe; United States	13:00.13
110 metres hurdles	Ja'Kobe Tharp; United States	12.94	Cordell Tinch; United States	12.95	Bradley Franklin; United States	13.01
400 metres hurdles	Alison dos Santos; Brazil	45.98	Rai Benjamin; United States	46.40 SB	Karsten Warholm; Norway	46.78
High jump	Gianmarco Tamberi; Italy	2.37 m WL	JuVaughn Harrison; United States	2.30 m	Erick Portillo; Mexico	2.26 m
Pole vault	Armand Duplantis; Sweden	6.20 m	Emmanouil Karalis; Greece	6.15 m	Sondre Guttormsen; Norway	5.95 m
Long jump	Miltiadis Tentoglou; Greece	8.35 m	Bozhidar Sarâboyukov; Bulgaria	8.34 m	Simon Ehammer; Switzerland	8.07 m
Hammer throw	Merlin Hummel; Germany	81.46 m	Bence Halász; Hungary	80.30 m	Mykhaylo Kokhan; Ukraine	78.90 m
Javelin throw	Rumesh Tharanga; Sri Lanka	91.09 m	Anderson Peters; Grenada	86.18 m	Julian Weber; Germany	85.89 m

=== Women ===
Event	Champion		Second		Third	
100 metres	Melissa Jefferson-Wooden; United States	10.62 WL	Julien Alfred; Saint Lucia	10.74	Sha'Carri Richardson; United States	10.76
200 metres	Melissa Jefferson-Wooden; United States	21.47 WL, PB	Gabrielle Thomas; United States	21.77	Kayla White; United States	21.93
400 metres	Marileidy Paulino; Dominican Republic	49.07	Henriette Jæger; Norway	49.28	Nickisha Pryce; Jamaica	49.56
800 metres	Audrey Werro; Switzerland	1:55.88	Keely Hodgkinson; Great Britain	1:56.26	Femke Broeders-Bol; Netherlands	1:56.74
1500 metres	Klaudia Kazimierska; Poland	3:57.55	Georgia Hunter Bell; Great Britain	3:57.72	Nikki Hiltz; United States	3:58.16
5000 metres	Likina Amebaw; Ethiopia	14:30.36	Jessica Hull; Australia	14:32.39 PB	Fantaye Belayneh; Ethiopia	14:32.62
100 metres hurdles	Masai Russell; United States	12.22	Tobi Amusan; Nigeria	12.34	Nadine Visser; Netherlands	12.39
400 metres hurdles	Jasmine Jones; United States	52.45 SB	Emma Zapletalová; Slovakia	52.68	Anna Cockrell; United States	53.09
High jump	Yaroslava Mahuchikh; Ukraine	1.99 m	Nicola Olyslagers; Australia	1.95 m	Eleanor Patterson; Australia Angelina Topić; Serbia	1.91 m
Pole vault	Sandi Morris; United States	4.90 m =SB	Hana Moll; United States	4.90 m	Angelica Moser; Switzerland	4.85 m =SB
Long jump	Larissa Iapichino; Italy	6.90 m	Jazmin Sawyers; Great Britain	6.78 m	Alyssa Jones; United States	6.77 m
Triple jump	Saly Sarr; Senegal	15.06 m	Davisleydi Velazco; Cuba	15.04 m	Leyanis Pérez Hernández; Cuba	14.90 m
Javelin throw	Haruka Kitaguchi; Japan	68.92 m NR	Yan Ziyi; China	68.05 m	Flor Ruiz; Colombia	64.84 m

=== Mixed ===
Event	Champion		Second		Third	
4 × 100 metres relay	United States; Ronnie Baker; Anavia Battle; Courtney Lindsey; Kayla White	39.64	Jamaica; Ackeem Blake; Tina Clayton; Kadrian Goldson; Jonielle Smith	39.72	Great Britain; Romell Glave; Imani Lansiquot; Jeremiah Azu; Success Eduan	40.26
4 × 400 metres relay	United States; Chris Bailey; Alexis Holmes; Jacory Patterson; Aaliyah Butler	3:08.32	Great Britain; Ben Jefferies; Yemi Mary John; Toby Harries; Charlotte Henrich	3:09.40	Netherlands; Jonas Phijffers; Lieke Klaver; Keenan Blake; Myrte van der Schoot	3:09.57

== Participating nations ==
381 athletes from 65 federations are entered into the championships.

Participating Federations
- Algeria (1)
- Australia (12)
- Bahrain (2)
- Belgium (8)
- Botswana (6)
- Brazil (3)
- Bulgaria (1)
- Burkina Faso (1)
- Burundi (1)
- Cameroon (1)
- Canada (14)
- China (2)
- Colombia (2)
- Croatia (1)
- Cuba (4)
- Czech Republic (3)
- Dominica (1)
- Dominican Republic (3)
- Ethiopia (12)
- France (12)
- Germany (11)
- Great Britain (27)
- Greece (2)
- Grenada (1)
- Hungary (17) (host)
- Ireland (3)
- Italy (14)
- Jamaica (39)
- Japan (5)
- Kenya (14)
- Latvia (1)
- Luxembourg (1)
- Mexico (1)
- Morocco (1)
- Netherlands (17)
- New Zealand (4)
- Nigeria (11)
- Norway (12)
- Pakistan (1)
- Panama (1)
- Poland (8)
- Portugal (4)
- Puerto Rico (1)
- Qatar (2)
- Saint Lucia (1)
- Saint Vincent and the Grenadines (1)
- Senegal (1)
- Serbia (3)
- Slovakia (1)
- Slovenia (2)
- South Africa (6)
- Spain (10)
- Sri Lanka (1)
- Sweden (2)
- Switzerland (8)
- Trinidad and Tobago (2)
- Turkey (1)
- Uganda (1)
- Ukraine (5)
- United States (80)
- Uzbekistan (1)
- Zambia (1)
- Zimbabwe (1)
