= 2020 United States Olympic trials (track and field) =

2020 United States Olympic track and field trials
- Dates: June 18–27, 2021
- Host city: Eugene, Oregon, USA
- Venue: Hayward Field
- Level: Senior
- Type: Outdoor
- Events: 40 (men: 20; women: 20)

The 2020 United States Olympic trials for track and field were staged in Eugene, Oregon, having been moved from the initially selected Hilmer Lodge Stadium in Walnut, California. This was first major event for the redesigned and rebuilt Hayward Field.

Organized by USA Track and Field and TrackTown USA, the ten-day competition was originally scheduled for June 19–28, 2020, but was rescheduled to June 18–27, 2021 due to the COVID-19 pandemic and the postponement of the 2020 Summer Olympics to 2021. It is serving as the national championships in track and field for the United States.

The results of the event determined qualification for the American Olympic team at the 2020 Summer Olympics, to be held in Tokyo. Provided they had achieved the Olympic standard or are in the World Athletics ranking quota, the top three athletes in each event gained a place on the Olympic team. In the event that a leading athlete did not hold the standard, or an athlete withdrew, the next highest finishing athlete with the standard was selected instead. USA Track and Field announced their Olympic roster based on these guidelines on July 6, 2021.

The trials for the men's and women's marathon were held on February 29, 2020 in Atlanta and the trials for the men's 50 km race walk were held on January 25, 2020 at San Diego Christian College and the Santee Town Center station in Santee, California.

Multiple rising high school and collegiate track athletes such as Nico Young, Erriyon Knighton, Hobbs Kessler, and Sha'Carri Richardson participated in the trials. Multiple world-leads, US records, and world records were broken during the trials such as Sydney McLaughlin's 400m hurdles WR of 51.90 during the finals, Erriyon Knighton's U-18 and U-20 200m record of 19.84 in the finals, and Ryan Crouser's shot put WR of 23.37m.

== Men's results ==
Key:
≠ Athlete without Olympic qualifying standard, not selected
Athlete without Olympic qualifying standard, invited to Olympics based on world list position

=== Men track events ===
Event	Gold		Silver		Bronze	
100 meters (Wind: +0.8 m/s)	Trayvon Bromell	9.80	Ronnie Baker	9.85 PB	Fred Kerley	9.86 PB
200 meters (Wind: +0.3 m/s)	Noah Lyles	19.74	Kenny Bednarek	19.78 PB	Erriyon Knighton	19.84 WJR
400 meters	Michael Norman	44.07	Michael Cherry	44.35 PB	Randolph Ross	44.74
800 meters	Clayton Murphy	1:43.17	Isaiah Jewett	1:43.85 PB	Bryce Hoppel	1:44.14
1500 meters	Cole Hocker	3:35.28	Matthew Centrowitz	3:35.34	Yared Nuguse	3:36.19
5000 meters	Paul Chelimo	13:26.82	Grant Fisher	13:27.01	Woody Kincaid	13:27.13
10,000 meters	Woody Kincaid	27:53.62	Grant Fisher	27:54.29	Joe Klecker	27:54.90
Marathon (Note: The 2020 U.S. Olympic trials Marathon took place Feb. 29, 2020, in Atlanta, Georgia.)	Galen Rupp	2:09:20	Jacob Riley	2:10:02	Abdi Abdirahman	2:10:03
110 meters hurdles (Wind: +0.4 m/s)	Grant Holloway	12.96	Devon Allen	13.10	Daniel Roberts	13.11
400 meters hurdles	Rai Benjamin	46.83 CR	Kenny Selmon	48.08 PB	David Kendziera	48.38
3000 meters steeplechase	Hillary Bor	8:21.34	Benard Keter	8:21.81	Mason Ferlic	8:22.05
20 km walk	Nick Christie	1:30:48	Daniel Nehnevaj ≠	1:31:59	Emmanuel Corvera ≠	1:34:38
50 km walk	Andreas Gustafsson ≠	4:12:11	Matthew Forgues ≠	4:14:42	Nick Christie ≠	4:27:28

=== Men field events ===
Event	Gold		Silver		Bronze	
High jump	JuVaughn Harrison	2.33 m (7 ft 7 1/2 in)	Darryl Sullivan	2.33 m (7 ft 7 1/2 in)	Shelby McEwen	2.30 m (7 ft 6 1/2 in)
Pole vault	Chris Nilsen	5.90 m (19 ft 4 1/4 in)	Sam Kendricks KC Lightfoot	5.85 m (19 ft 2 1/4 in)	Not awarded	
Long jump	JuVaughn Harrison	8.47 m (27 ft 9 1/4 in) (Wind: -0.2 m/s)	Marquis Dendy	8.38 m (27 ft 5 3/4 in) (Wind: +0.5 m/s)	Steffin McCarter	8.26 m (27 ft 1 in) (Wind: -0.2 m/s)
Triple jump	Will Claye	17.21 m (56 ft 5 1/2 in) (Wind: +0.1 m/s)	Donald Scott	17.18 m (56 ft 4 1/4 in) (Wind: +0.5 m/s)	Chris Benard	17.01 m (55 ft 9 1/2 in) (Wind: +0.1 m/s)
Shot put	Ryan Crouser	23.37 m (76 ft 8 in) WR	Joe Kovacs	22.34 m (73 ft 3 1/2 in)	Payton Otterdahl	21.92 m (71 ft 10 3/4 in)
Discus throw	Mason Finley	63.07 m (206 ft 11 in)	Reggie Jagers	62.61 m (205 ft 4 in)	Sam Mattis	62.51 m (205 ft 1 in)
Hammer throw	Rudy Winkler	82.71 m (271 ft 4 in) NR CR	Daniel Haugh	79.39 m (260 ft 5 in)	Alex Young	78.32 m (256 ft 11 in)
Javelin throw	Curtis Thompson	82.78 m (271 ft 7 in)	Michael Shuey	79.24 m (259 ft 11 in)	Riley Dolezal ≠	77.07 m (252 ft 10 in)
Decathlon	Garrett Scantling	8647 pts	Steve Bastien	8485 pts	Zach Ziemek	8471 pts

== Women's results ==
Key: ≠ Athlete without Olympic qualifying standard, not selected.

=== Women track events ===
Event	Gold		Silver		Bronze	
100 meters (Wind: -1.0 m/s) ^{[a]}	Javianne Oliver	10.99	Teahna Daniels	11.03	Jenna Prandini	11.11
200 meters (Wind: +1.3 m/s)	Gabrielle Thomas	21.61 WL CR	Jenna Prandini	21.89	Anavia Battle	21.95
400 meters	Quanera Hayes	49.78	Allyson Felix	50.02 MWR	Wadeline Jonathas	50.03
800 meters	Athing Mu	1:56.07 WL CR	Raevyn Rogers	1:57.66	Ajeé Wilson	1:58.39
1500 meters	Elinor Purrier St. Pierre	3:58.03 CR	Cory McGee	4:00.67	Heather MacLean	4:02.09
5000 meters	Elise Cranny	15:27.81	Karissa Schweizer	15:28.11	Rachel Schneider	15:29.56
10,000 meters	Emily Sisson	31:03.82 CR	Karissa Schweizer	31:16.52	Alicia Monson	31:18.55
Marathon	Aliphine Tuliamuk	2:27:23	Molly Seidel	2:27:31	Sally Kipyego	2:28:52
100 meters hurdles (Wind: +0.8 m/s) ^{[b]}	Keni Harrison	12.47	Christina Clemons	12.53	Gabbi Cunningham	12.53
400 meters hurdles	Sydney McLaughlin	51.90 WR	Dalilah Muhammad	52.42	Anna Cockrell	53.70
3000 meters steeplechase	Emma Coburn	9:09.41 CR	Courtney Frerichs	9:11.79	Valerie Constien	9:18.34
20 km walk	Robyn Stevens	1:35:13	Maria Michta-Coffey ≠	1:39:25	Miranda Melville ≠	1:40:39
50 km walk	Robyn Stevens	4:37:31	Erin Taylor-Talcott	4:47:00	Katie Burnett	4:53:26

=== Women field events ===
Event	Gold		Silver		Bronze	
High jump ^{[c]}	Vashti Cunningham	1.96 m (6 ft 5 in)	Inika McPherson ≠	1.93 m (6 ft 3 3/4 in)	Nicole Greene ≠	1.93 m (6 ft 3 3/4 in)
Pole vault	Katie Nageotte	4.95 m (16 ft 2 3/4 in) WL CR PB	Morgann LeLeux	4.70 m (15 ft 5 in) PB	Sandi Morris	4.60 m (15 ft 1 in)
Long jump	Brittney Reese	7.13 m (23 ft 4 1/2 in) (Wind: +1.3 m/s)	Tara Davis	7.04 m (23 ft 1 in) (Wind: +1.4 m/s)	Quanesha Burks	6.96 m (22 ft 10 in) (Wind: +1.6 m/s)
Triple jump	Keturah Orji	14.52 m (47 ft 7 1/2 in) (Wind: +0.9 m/s)	Tori Franklin	14.36 m (47 ft 1 1/4 in) (Wind: +1.4 m/s)	Jasmine Moore	14.15 m (46 ft 5 in) (Wind: +1.6 m/s)
Shot put	Jessica Ramsey	20.12 m (66 ft 0 in) CR	Raven Saunders	19.96 m (65 ft 5 in)	Adelaide Aquilla	18.95 m (62 ft 2 in)
Discus throw ^{[d]}	Valarie Allman	69.92 m (229 ft 4 in)	Micaela Hazlewood ≠	62.54 m (205 ft 2 in)	Rachel Dincoff	60.21 m (197 ft 6 in)
Hammer throw	DeAnna Price	80.31 m (263 ft 5 in) NR CR	Brooke Andersen	77.72 m (254 ft 11 in)	Gwen Berry	73.50 m (241 ft 1 in)
Javelin throw ^{[e]}	Maggie Malone	63.50 m (208 ft 4 in)	Kara Winger	61.47 m (201 ft 8 in)	Avione Allgood-Whetstone ≠	58.94 m (193 ft 4 in)
Heptathlon	Annie Kunz	6703 pts	Kendell Williams	6683 pts	Erica Bougard	6667 pts

==== Notes ====
^{a} Sha'Carri Richardson originally finished first in a time of 10.86, but she was suspended by World Athletics after testing positive for THC.
^{b} Brianna McNeal originally finished second in a time of 12.51, but she was suspended for five years for an anti-doping rule violation (missed tests). While she was allowed to compete at the trials pending appeal, her suspension was later upheld.
^{c} Neither McPherson nor Greene achieved the Olympic standard or a qualifying world ranking. In addition to Cunningham, USATF selected fourth-placed Rachel McCoy who previously achieved the Olympic standard, and Tynita Butts, who did not reach the finals but held a qualifying ranking of #21.
^{d} Hazlewood had not achieved the Olympic standard or a qualifying world ranking. Fourth place Kelsey Card, who had a qualifying ranking of #23, was instead selected.
^{e} Allgood-Whetstone had not achieved the Olympic standard or a qualifying world ranking. Fourth place Ariana Ince, who had a qualifying ranking of #16, was instead selected.

== Schedule ==
Event schedule
DAY ONE—FRIDAY, JUNE 18, 2021
NBC Sports Gold
Time (PST)	Event	Division	Round
2:50 p.m.	National Anthem		
4:03 p.m.	1500m	Women	1st Round
4:30 p.m.	400m	Women	1st Round
4:58 p.m.	400m	Men	1st Round
5:26 p.m.	800m	Men	1st Round
5:54 p.m.	5000m	Women	1st Round
6:37 p.m.	100m	Women	1st Round
7:25 p.m.	10,000m	Men	Final
Field Events
12:00 p.m.	Shot put	Men	Qualifying
4:00 p.m.	Discus throw	Women	Qualifying
4:45 p.m.	High jump	Women	Qualifying
6:15 p.m.	Long jump	Women	Qualifying
6:30 p.m.	Shot put	Men	Final
DAY TWO—SATURDAY, JUNE 19, 2021
1:00 p.m.	100m	Men	Decathlon
5:04 p.m.	100m hurdles	Women	1st Round
5:34 p.m.	100m	Men	1st Round
6:03 p.m.	100m	Women	Semifinals
6:18 p.m.	400m	Men	Decathlon
6:40 p.m.	1500m	Women	Semifinals
7:04 p.m.	800m	Men	Semifinals
7:20 p.m.	400m	Women	Semifinals
7:35 p.m.	400m	Men	Semifinals
7:51 p.m	100m	Women	Final
Decathlon
1:00 p.m.	100m	Men	Decathlon
1:50 p.m.	Long jump	Men	Decathlon
2:50 p.m.	Shot put	Men	Decathlon
4:00 p.m.	High jump	Men	Decathlon
6:18 p.m.	400m	Men	Decathlon
Field Events
2:15 p.m.	Javelin throw	Men	Qualifying
4:30 p.m.	Pole vault	Men	Qualifying
5:15 p.m.	Triple jump	Men	Qualifying
6:42 p.m.	Discus throw	Women	Final
DAY THREE—SUNDAY, JUNE 20, 2021
12:15 p.m.	110m hurdles	Men	Decathlon
6:03 p.m.	100mH	Women	Semifinals
6:19 p.m	100m	Men	Semifinals
6:35 p.m.	3000m steeplechase	Women	1st Round
7:06 p.m.	400m	Women	Final
7:15 p.m.	400m	Men	Final
7:23 p.m.	1500m	Men	Decathlon
7:43 p.m.	100mH	Women	Final
7:52 p.m.	100m	Men	Final
Decathlon
12:15 p.m.	110m hurdles	Men	Decathlon
1:20 p.m.	Discus throw	Men	Decathlon
3:45 p.m.	Pole vault	Men	Decathlon
5:15 p.m.	Javelin	Men	Decathlon
6:15 p.m.	Javelin	Men	Decathlon
7:23 p.m.	1500m	Men	Decathlon
Field Events
5:50 p.m.	High jump	Women	Final
5:55 p.m.	Triple jump	Women	Final
DAY FOUR—MONDAY, JUNE 21, 2021
4:20 p.m.	National Anthem		
4:29 p.m.	3000m steeplechase	Men	1st Round
5:05 p.m.	1500m	Women	Final
5:28 p.m.	800m	Men	Final
5:40 p.m.	5,000m	Women	Final
Field Events
3:30 p.m.	Pole vault	Men	Final
4:15 p.m.	Javelin throw	Men	Final
4:40 p.m.	Triple jump	Men	Final
DAY FIVE—WEDNESDAY, JUNE 23, 2021
Field Events
12:50 p.m.	National Anthem		
1:00 p.m.	Hammer throw	Men	Qualifying
3:00 p.m.	Hammer throw	Men	Final
4:30 p.m.	Hammer throw	Women	Qualifying
6:30 p.m.	Hammer throw	Women	Final
DAY SIX—THURSDAY, JUNE 24, 2021
5:50 p.m.	National Anthem		
6:04 p.m.	1500m	Men	1st Round
6:31 p.m.	200m	Women	1st Round
7:00 p.m.	800m	Women	1st Round
7:32 p.m.	400m hurdles	Men	1st Round
8:04 p.m.	5000m	Men	1st Round
8:47 p.m.	3000m Steeple	Women	Final
Field Events
1:30 p.m.	Shot put	Women	Qualifying
5:00 p.m.	Pole vault	Women	Qualifying
5:45 p.m.	Long jump	Women	Qualifying
7:05 p.m.	Discus throw	Men	Qualifying
8:00 p.m.	Shot put	Women	Final
DAY SEVEN—FRIDAY, JUNE 25, 2021
1:50 p.m.	National Anthem		
2:04 p.m.	200m	Men	1st Round
2:33 p.m.	110m hurdles	Men	1st Round
3:02 p.m.	800m	Women	Semifinals
3:18 p.m.	400m hurdles	Men	Semifinals
3:35 p.m.	400m hurdles	Women	1st Round
4:05 p.m.	1500m	Men	Semifinals
4:25 p.m.	200m	Women	Semifinals
4:42 p.m.	3000m steeplechase	Men	Final
Field Events
1:00 p.m.	Javelin throw	Women	Qualifying
2:10 p.m.	Long jump	Men	Qualifying
3:00 p.m.	High jump	Men	Qualifying
3:30 p.m.	Discus throw	Men	Final
DAY EIGHT—SATURDAY, JUNE 26, 2021
9:00 a.m.	20 km Race Walk	Men	Final
9:01 a.m.	20 km Race Walk	Women	Final
1:15 p.m	100m hurdles	Women	Heptathlon
5:20 p.m.	National Anthem		
5:38 p.m	200m	Women	Heptathlon
6:03 p.m.	110m hurdles	Men	Semifinals
6:19 p.m.	400m hurdles	Women	Semifinals
6:35 p.m.	400m hurdles	Men	Final
6:44 p.m.	10,000m	Women	Final
7:24 p.m.	200m	Women	Final
7:33 p.m.	200m	Men	Semifinals
7:51 p.m.	110m hurdles	Men	Final
Field Events
5:30 p.m.	Javelin	Women	Final
5:40 p.m.	Pole vault	Women	Final
6:30 p.m.	Long jump	Women	Final
Heptathlon
1:15 p.m.	100m hurdles	Women	Heptathlon
2:30 p.m.	High jump	Women	Heptathlon
4:40 p.m.	Shot put	Women	Heptathlon
5:38 p.m	200m	Women	Heptathlon
DAY NINE—SUNDAY, JUNE 27, 2021
3:50 p.m.	800m - b	Women	Heptathlon
4:04 p.m.	800m - a	Women	Heptathlon
4:20 p.m.	400m hurdles	Women	Final
4:30 p.m.	5000m	Men	Final
4:52 p.m.	800m	Women	Final
5:10 p.m.	1500m	Men	Final
5:22 p.m.	200m	Men	Final
FIELD EVENTS
3:20 p.m.	High jump	Men	Final
4:00 p.m.	Long jump	Men	Final
Heptathlon
1:00 p.m.	Long jump	Women	Heptathlon
2:15 p.m.	Javelin throw	Women	Heptathlon
3:50 p.m.	800m - b	Women	Heptathlon
4:04 p.m.	800m - a	Women	Heptathlon

== Qualification ==
USA Track & Field sets minimum performances standards for entry into the national championships. In order to merit entry into the championships, an athlete must meet that standard, or better, within a set time frame prior to the competition.

All qualifying performances for the U.S. Olympic trials must be attained on a standard outdoor track in the period

- Wednesday, May 1, 2019 through Sunday, June 6, 2021,

or on an indoor track, in the same event, in the period

- Wednesday, January 1, 2020 through Sunday, June 6, 2021;

except for the 10,000 meters, Decathlon & Heptathlon and 20 km Race Walks, whose qualifying period is from

- Tuesday, January 1, 2019 through Sunday, June 6, 2021.

The qualifying performance for the men's 50 km Race walk must be attained in the period

- Monday January 1, 2018 through Sunday, January 12, 2020.

There are also automatic qualifying criteria outside of the entry standards. Athletes who are the reigning indoor or outdoor national champion are automatically qualified to enter that event.

Qualifying marks must be attained in a 2020 U.S. Olympic trials event. No qualifying marks will be allowed using alternate events, except for the men's Mile run as follows: An appeal to use a Mile qualifying mark for the 1500 will be accepted only if the mile mark was made during the 2020 season, from Wednesday, January 1, 2020 through Sunday, June 6, 2021, and the mark is 3:54.00 or better.

For events over distances from 100 m to 800 m, performances will only be accepted if fully automatic timing (FAT) is used. For performances beyond that distance, FAT times are also used, but in the event that the athlete has not recorded a FAT performance, a manually recorded time may be used. There will be no adjustment for marks made at altitude. Wind-assisted performances will not be accepted for 2020 U.S. Olympic trials qualifying.

Event	Men's standard	Women's standard	Max entrants	Rounds
100 m	10.05	11.15	32	3
200 m	20.24	22.80	30	3
400 m	45.20	51.35	28	3
800 m	1:46.00	2:02.50	32	3
1500 m	3:37.50 (3:54.00 for mile run)	4:06.00	30	3
5000 m	13:25.00	15:20.00	24	1
10,000 m	28:00.00	32:25.00	24	1
20,000 m race walk	1:36:00	1:48:00	15	1
50,000 m race walk	5:15:00	-	15	1
110/100 m hurdles	13.48	12.84	32	3
400 m hurdles	49.50	56.25	28	3
3000 m steeplechase	8:32.00	9:50.00	24	2
High jump	2.26 m (7 ft 4 3/4 in)	1.87 m (6 ft 1 1/2 in)	24	2
Pole vault	5.75 m (18 ft 10 1/4 in)	4.60 m (15 ft 1 in)	24	2
Long jump	8.00 m (26 ft 2 3/4 in)	6.70 m (21 ft 11 3/4 in)	24	2
Triple jump	16.66 m (54 ft 7 3/4 in)	13.50 m (44 ft 3 1/4 in)	24	2
Shot put	20.65 m (67 ft 8 3/4 in)	17.70 m (58 ft 3/4 in)	24	2
Discus throw	62.00 m (203 ft 4 3/4 in)	58.00 m (190 ft 3 1/4 in)	24	2
Hammer throw	72.00 m (236 ft 2 1/2 in)	68.00 m (223 ft 1 in)	24	2
Javelin throw	75.00 m (246 ft 3/4 in)	54.00 m (177 ft 1 3/4 in)	24	2
Decathlon/Heptathlon	7900 pts	6000 pts	18	1
