= Ronnie Baker (sprinter) =

American sprinter (born 1993)

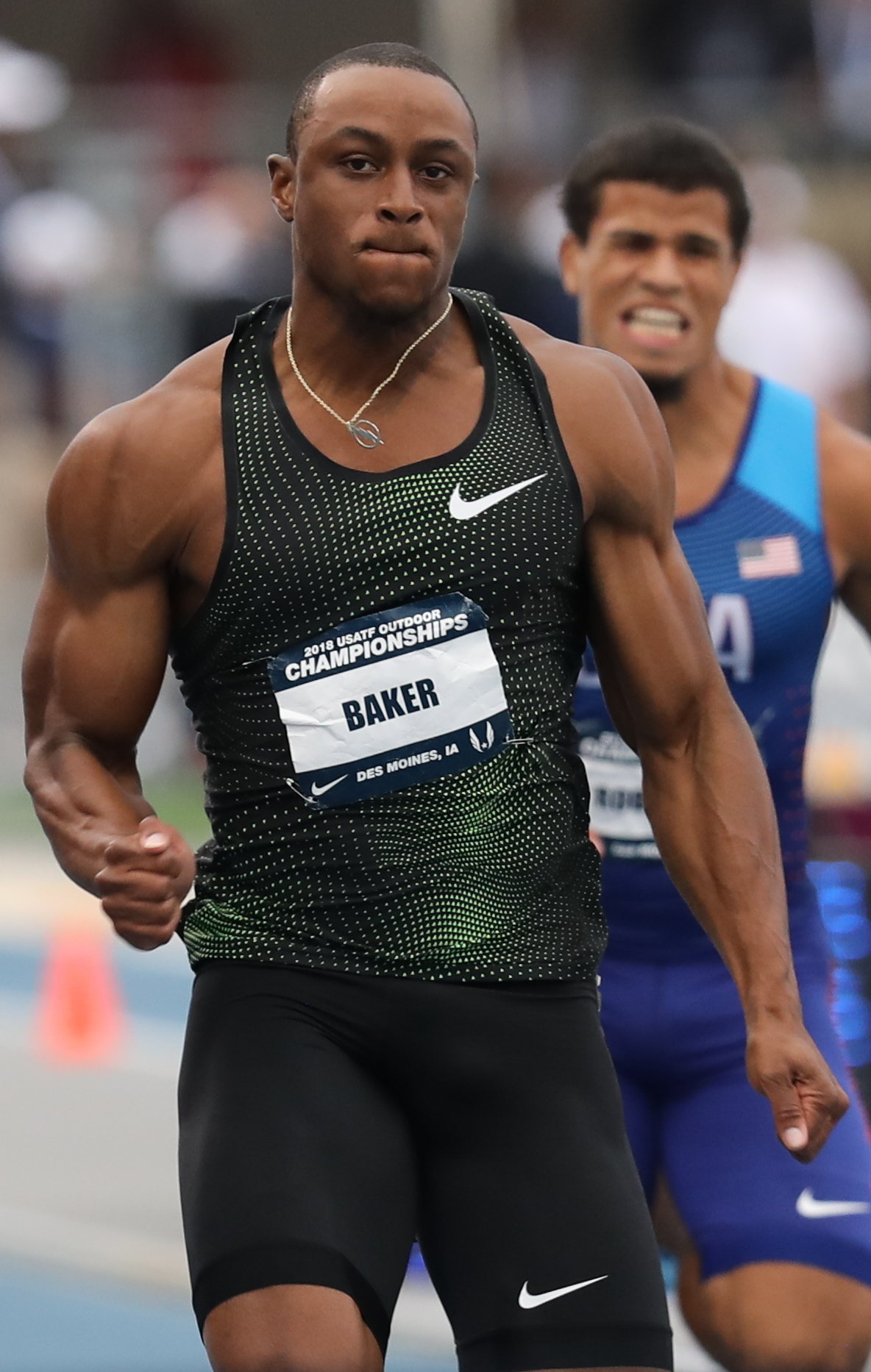
- Baker at the 2018 USATF Championships

Personal information
- Born: October 15, 1993 (age 33) Louisville, Kentucky, U.S.
- Employers: Adidas, Performance Kitchen
- Height: 5 ft 10 in (178 cm)

Sport
- Country: United States
- Sport: Track and field
- Event: Sprints
- College team: TCU Horned Frogs (2013–2016)
- Coached by: Darryl Anderson

Achievements and titles
- Personal bests: 60 m: 6.40 A (2018); 100 m: 9.83 (2021); 200 m: 20.54 (2024)
Medal record
Men's athletics
Representing the United States
World Championships
Gold medal – first place	2025 Tokyo	4 × 100 m relay
World Ultimate Championship
First place	2026 Budapest	4 × 100 m mixed
Third place	2026 Budapest	100 m
World Indoor Championships
Bronze medal – third place	2018 Birmingham	60 m
World Relays
Gold medal – first place	2026 Gaborone	4 × 100 m relay
Gold medal – first place	2017 Nassau	4 × 100 m relay
World Indoor Tour
Winner	2020	60 m

Ronnie Baker (born October 15, 1993) is an American professional track and field athlete specializing in the sprints. Over 60 meters his personal best time of 6.40 seconds makes him the third-fastest man in the event in history. He was champion over 60 m at the USA Indoor Championships in 2017, a medalist over 60 m at the World Indoor Championships in 2018, and a gold medallist in the 4 × 100 m relay at the World Relays in 2017. Baker was a dominant competitor over 100 m in the Diamond League circuit in 2018, winning four races and placing no worse than second, including in the final where he also placed second. He was the fastest man in the world in 2017 over 60 m, and the second fastest in 2018 over both 60 m and 100 m. In college he competed for the TCU Horned Frogs, where he was champion over 60 m at the NCAA Division I Indoor Championships in both 2015 and 2016. At the 2020 Tokyo Olympics, Ronnie Baker ran his personal best of 9.83 in the men's 100 m semi-finals, which made him the 6th fastest man in the history of Olympics 100 m event.

== Early life ==
When Baker first started with school he ran cross country. Once in middle school he switched to running the 400 meters, and stuck with that through high school, competing in both track and basketball at Ballard High School in Louisville, Kentucky. Baker looked up to and was influenced by Michael Johnson, Tyson Gay, and Usain Bolt during his running career.

== Track career ==
Baker ran for the Texas Christian University (TCU) track team, switching from the 400 meters to the shorter sprint events. During his time there, he was twice NCAA (United States collegiate) champion in the 60 m event in 2015 and 2016.

In 2017, Baker became national indoor champion over 60 m. A month later at the World Relays he earned his first gold medal at a global championship in the 4 × 100 m relay.

In 2018, Baker won third in the World Indoor Championships.

He set his 100 m then-personal best (9.87, wind −0.1 m/s) on August 22, 2018, at the Kamila Skolimowska Memorial in Chorzów.

In his first 100 m race of 2021 at the Texas Relays on March 27, Baker won in a world leading 9.94 s and also broke the 1992 meet record of 9.97 s set by Olapade Adeniken.

He qualified for the Tokyo Olympics by running, at the time, a personal best of 9.85 in the 100 m, while finishing 2nd at the 2020 US Olympic Trials.

Baker's Tokyo Olympic semifinal personal best time of 9.83 at the time made him the 6th fastest American man and tied him at the time for the 9th fastest time in Olympic 100 m history; it also qualifies him as the fifth-fastest American in Olympic 100 m history.

In 2025, Baker won the USA Indoor 60 meters title, becoming the only athlete in history to capture the championship eight years apart, having previously won in 2017. During the outdoor season, he became the first athlete to run a sub-10-second 100 meters on Slovak soil, marking a historic performance for the country. Later that year, Baker represented the United States at the World Championships in Tokyo, where he earned a gold medal as a member of the U.S. 4 × 100 meters relay team.

== Accolades and awards ==
While in high school, Baker was named in 2011 and 2012 the Gatorade state boys track and field athlete of the year. He received enough powdered Gatorade that he and his mother were able to stock Ballard High with the product for a time.

== Personal life ==
A native of Louisville, Kentucky, Baker attended Ballard High School. He also lived in Anchorage, Alaska for seven years in his youth. Baker is a distant relative of Tyson Gay. He married the former Mikaela Harrison on March 7, 2020, in Fort Worth, Texas. He has a daughter, Mayah, and son, RJ. Baker is a Christian.

== Statistics ==
Information from World Athletics profile unless otherwise noted.

=== Personal bests ===
Event	Time (s)	Wind (m/s)	Venue	Date	Notes
60 m	6.40 A	—N/a	Albuquerque, New Mexico, US	February 18, 2018	Altitude-assisted
100 m	9.83	+0.9	Tokyo, Japan	August 1, 2021	
100 m	9.78 w	+2.4	Eugene, Oregon, US	May 26, 2018	Wind-assisted
200 m	20.54	+0.5	Szekesfehervar, Hungary, US	July 9, 2024	
200 m	20.06 w	+4.3	Austin, Texas, US	April 29, 2017	Wind-assisted
200 m indoor	20.60 A	—N/a	Albuquerque, New Mexico, US	January 30, 2016	Altitude-assisted
4 × 100 m relay	38.09	—N/a	Knoxville, Tennessee, US	April 14, 2018	

=== International championship results ===
Representing the United States
Year	Competition	Venue	Position	Event	Notes
2015	Universiade	Gwangju, South Korea	4th	100 m	10.17 (0.0 m/s wind)
2015	Universiade	Gwangju, South Korea	DNF (semi 2)	4 × 100 m relay	Did not finish
2015	Universiade	Gwangju, South Korea	DQ	4 × 400 m relay	~~3:06.56~~
2017	World Relays	Nassau, Bahamas	1st	4 × 100 m relay	38.43
2018	World Indoor Championships	Birmingham, England	3rd	60 m	6.44
2025	World Indoor Championships	Nanjing, China	6th	60 m	6.59
2025	World Championships	Tokyo, Japan	4th (h)	4 × 100 m relay	37.98
2026	World Ultimate Championship	Budapest, Hungary	3rd	100 m	9.93

=== Circuit wins ===
- Diamond League (100 m)
  - Eugene: 2017, 2018
  - Rome: 2018
  - Paris: 2018
  - London: 2018
  - Stockholm: 2021
  - Monaco: 2021
- World Athletics Indoor Tour (60 m)
  - Overall winner: 2020
  - Toruń: 2017
  - Birmingham: 2017
  - Glasgow: 2020
  - Liévin: 2020
  - Madrid: 2020

=== National championship results ===
Representing the Louisville Track Club (2012), TCU Horned Frogs (2013–2016), and Nike (2017–2021)
Year	Competition	Venue	Position	Event	Time	Notes
2012	USATF Junior Championships	Bloomington, Indiana	15th	400 m	48.28	
2013	NCAA Division I Championships	Eugene, Oregon	7th	4 × 100 m relay	39.87	
2013	NCAA Division I Championships	Eugene, Oregon	7th	4 × 400 m relay	3:05.37	
2014	NCAA Division I Indoor Championships	Albuquerque, New Mexico	10th	4 × 400 m relay	3:12:41	
2014	NCAA Division I Championships	Eugene, Oregon	23rd	100 m	10.74	(+0.6 m/s wind)
2014	NCAA Division I Championships	Eugene, Oregon	10th	4 × 100 m relay	39.52	SB
2015	NCAA Division I Indoor Championships	Fayetteville, Arkansas	1st	60 m	6.52	PB
2015	NCAA Division I Indoor Championships	Fayetteville, Arkansas	5th	4 × 400 m relay	3:07.03	
2015	NCAA Division I Championships	Eugene, Oregon	10th	4 × 400 m relay	3:06.25	
2015	NCAA Division I Championships	Eugene, Oregon	2nd	4 × 100 m relay	38.59	PB
2015	USATF Championships	Eugene, Oregon	7th	100 m	10.19	(0.0 m/s wind)
2016	NCAA Division I Indoor Championships	Birmingham, Alabama	1st	60 m	6.47	WL, CR, PB
2016	NCAA Division I Championships	Eugene, Oregon	9th	100 m	10.09	(+1.6 m/s wind) SB
2016	NCAA Division I Championships	Eugene, Oregon	6th	4 × 100 m relay	38.72	SB
2016	US Olympic Trials	Eugene, Oregon	12th	100 m	10.10	(+2.0 m/s wind)
2017	USATF Indoor Championships	Albuquerque, New Mexico	1st	60 m	6.45	WL, PB
2017	USATF Championships	Sacramento, California	12th	100 m	10.26	(−1.4 m/s wind)
2018	USATF Indoor Championships	Albuquerque, New Mexico	2nd	60 m	6.40	PB
2018	USATF Championships	Des Moines, Iowa	2nd	100 m	9.90	(+1.1 m/s wind) PB
2019	USATF Championships	Des Moines, Iowa	5th	100 m	10.20	(−1.0 m/s wind)
2021	US Olympic Trials	Eugene, Oregon	2nd	100 m	9.85	(+0.8 m/s wind) PB

- NCAA results from Track & Field Results Reporting System.

=== Seasonal bests ===
100 m
Year	Time	Wind (m/s)	Venue	Notes
2011	10.57	+0.6	Louisville, Kentucky, US	
2012	10.59	+1.0	Louisville, Kentucky, US	
2013	10.33 w	+4.3	Fort Worth, Texas, US	Wind-assisted
2013	10.58	−1.4	Waco, Texas, US	
2014	10.21	+0.7	Fayetteville, Arkansas, US	
2014	10.14 w	+2.7	Fayetteville, Arkansas, US	Wind-assisted
2015	10.05	+1.8	Ames, Iowa, US	
2015	9.94 w	+2.1	Eugene, Oregon, US	Wind-assisted
2016	9.95 w	+2.7	Fort Worth, Texas, US	Wind-assisted
2016	10.09	+1.6	Eugene, Oregon, US	
2017	9.98	+0.4	Kingston, Jamaica	
2017	9.86 w	+2.4	Eugene, Oregon, US	Wind-assisted
2018	9.78 w	+2.4	Eugene, Oregon, US	Wind-assisted
2018	9.87	−0.1	Chorzów, Poland	
2019	10.20	−1.0	Des Moines, Iowa, US	
2020	10.00	+1.1	Fort Worth, Texas, US	
2021	9.83	+0.9	Tokyo, Japan	

60 m
Year	Time	Venue	Notes
2013	6.76	College Station, Texas, US	
2014	6.94	College Station, Texas, US	
2015	6.52	Fayetteville, Arkansas, US	
2016	6.47	Birmingham, Alabama, US	
2017	6.45 A	Albuquerque, New Mexico, US	Altitude-assisted
2018	6.40 A	Albuquerque, New Mexico, US	Altitude-assisted
2020	6.44	Liévin, France	
2020	6.44	Madrid, Spain	
2021	6.53	Fayetteville, Arkansas, US	

=== Track records ===
As of 9 September 2024, Baker holds the following track records for 100 metres.

Location	Time	Windspeed m/s	Date	Notes
Chorzów	9.87	– 0.1	22/08/2018	Track record shared with Fred Kerley (USA) from 25/08/2024.
Stade Sébastien Charléty, Paris	9.88	+ 0.8	30/06/2018	
Torrance	9.97	+ 0.5	21/04/2018	

== See also ==
- 2018 in 100 metres

Achievements
Preceded by (Jamaica) Asafa Powell	Men's 60 meters season's best 2017	Succeeded by (United States) Christian Coleman
