= Gyulai István Memorial =

Annual track and field meet

- Date: July
- Location: Ferenc Puskás Stadium, Budapest (2011–2013); Bregyó közi Regionális Atlétika Központ, Székesfehérvár (2014–2024); National Athletics Centre, Budapest, Hungary (2025–)
- Event type: Track and field
- World Athletics Cat.: World Athletics Continental Tour Gold
- Established: 2011
- Last held: 2026
- Edition: 16
- Website: gyulaimemorial.hu/en/

The Gyulai István Memorial – Hungarian Athletics Grand Prix (Hungarian: Gyulai István Memorial – Atlétikai Magyar Nagydíj) is an annual track and field meet that takes place at Bregyó közi Regionális Atlétika Központ in Székesfehérvár, Hungary. It was first held in 2011 at the Ferenc Puskás Stadium in Budapest, as the successor of the Budapest Grand Prix of the 1980s.

The meeting is part of an international circuit of meetings, currently under the auspices of the World Athletics Continental Tour.

The Memorial is named after István Gyulai, who died in 2006, and served as secretary of the World Athletics.

== World records ==
Over the course of its history, one world record has been set at the Gyulai István Memorial.

World records set at Gyulai István Memorial
Year	Event	Record	Athlete	Nationality
2025	Pole vault	6.29 m	Armand Duplantis	Sweden

== Meeting records ==
=== Men ===
Men's meeting records of the Gyulai István Memorial
Event	Record	Athlete	Nationality	Date	Ref.
60 m	6.63 (+0.3 m/s)	Dominik Illovszky	Hungary	12 August 2025	
100 m	9.84 (+1.2 m/s)	Akani Simbine	South Africa	6 July 2021	
200 m	19.69 (−0.4 m/s)	Bryan Levell	Jamaica	12 August 2025	
400 m	43.74	Steven Gardiner	Bahamas	18 July 2023	
600 m	1:15.07	Donavan Brazier	United States	19 August 2020	
800 m	1:42.96	Laban Chepkwony	Kenya	12 August 2025	
1000 m	2:16.08	Ayanleh Souleiman	Djibouti	2 July 2018	
1500 m	3:31.09	Phanuel Koech	Kenya	14 July 2026	
3000 m	7:30.96	Muktar Edris	Ethiopia	6 July 2021	
5000 m	13:24.51	Michael Kiprop Tiony	Kenya	30 July 2011	
110 m hurdles	12.85 (−0.4 m/s)	Ja'Kobe Tharp	United States	14 July 2026	
400 m hurdles	47.58	Emil Agyekum	Germany	14 July 2026	
3000 m steeplechase	8:10.48	Benjamin Kigen	Kenya	2 July 2018	
High jump	2.40 m	Mutaz Essa Barshim	Qatar	2 July 2018	
Pole vault	6.29 m	Armand Duplantis	Sweden	12 August 2025	
Long jump	8.34 m (+0.5 m/s)	Ruswahl Samaai	South Africa	4 July 2017	
Triple jump	17.92 m (+0.4 m/s)	Pedro Pichardo	Portugal	6 July 2021	
Shot put	22.89 m	Joe Kovacs	United States	8 August 2022	
Discus throw	71.23 m	Kristjan Čeh	Slovenia	8 August 2022	
Hammer throw	83.64 m	Ethan Katzberg	Canada	14 July 2026	
Javelin throw	83.71 m	Marcin Krukowski	Poland	4 July 2017	

=== Women ===
Women's meeting records of the Gyulai István Memorial
Event	Record	Athlete	Nationality	Date	Ref.
100 m	10.67 (+1.3 m/s)	Shelly-Ann Fraser-Pryce	Jamaica	8 August 2022	
200 m	21.83 (±0.0 m/s)	Gabrielle Thomas	United States	14 July 2026	
400 m	49.53	Shaunae Miller-Uibo	Bahamas	2 July 2018	
800 m	1:59.33	Diribe Welteji	Ethiopia	8 August 2022	
1500 m	3:58.25	Georgia Griffith	Australia	12 August 2025	
Mile run	4:24.29	Genzebe Dibaba	Ethiopia	2 July 2018	
2000 m	5:33.76	Genzebe Dibaba	Ethiopia	9 July 2019	
3000 m	9:02.68	Sylvia Jebiwot Kibet	Kenya	20 August 2012	
5000 m	15:02.83	Agnes Jebet Tirop	Kenya	4 July 2017	
100 m hurdles	12.28 (+0.1 m/s)	Kendra Harrison	United States	4 July 2017	
400 m hurdles	51.68	Sydney McLaughlin	United States	8 August 2022	
3000 m steeplechase	9:20.01	Etenesh Diro	Ethiopia	3 July 2017	
High jump	2.00 m	Eleanor Patterson	Australia	14 July 2026	
Pole vault	4.80 m	Nina Kennedy	Australia	14 July 2026	
Pole vault	4.80 m	Eliza McCartney	Australia	14 July 2026	
Long jump	6.94 m (+0.9 m/s)	Tianna Bartoletta	United States	8 July 2014	
Triple Jump	14.15 m	Irina Gumenyuk	Russia	10 July 2013	
Shot put	20.19 m	Valerie Adams	New Zealand	18 July 2016	
Hammer throw	78.10 m	Anita Włodarczyk	Poland	17 July 2016	
Javelin throw	62.73 m	Liveta Jasiūnaitė	Lithuania	6 July 2021	
