= 2020 USA Indoor Track and Field Championships =

2020 USA Track & Field Indoor Championships
- Dates: February 14-15
- Host city: Albuquerque, New Mexico, United States
- Venue: Albuquerque Convention Center
- Level: Senior
- Type: Indoor
- Events: 26 (men: 13; women: 13)

The 2020 USA Indoor Track and Field Championships were held at the Albuquerque Convention Center in Albuquerque, New Mexico. Organized by USA Track and Field (USATF), the two-day competition took place from February 14 to February 15 and serves as the national championships in track and field for the United States.

The heptathlon and pentathlon being contested as part of the 2020 USATF Indoor Combined Events Championships will be held February 7-8, 2020 at the United States Naval Academy’s Wesley Brown Field House in Annapolis, Maryland.

== Schedule ==
H	Heats	½	Semi-finals	F	Final
M = morning session, A = afternoon session

Men
Date →	14 February	15 February	
Event ↓	A	A	
60 metres	H	½	F
400 metres	H	F	
800 metres	H	F	
1500 metres		F	
3000 metres	F		
3000 metres race walk	F		
60 metres hurdles	H	½	F
High jump	F		
Pole vault	F		
Long jump	F		
Triple jump		F	
Shot put	F		
35 lbs Weight throw	F		

Women
Date →	14 February	15 February	
Event ↓	A	A	
60 metres	H	½	F
400 metres	H	F	
800 metres	H	F	
1500 metres	F		
3000 metres		F	
3000 metres race walk		F	
60 metres hurdles	H	½	F
High jump	F		
Pole vault		F	
Long jump	F		
Triple jump		F	
Shot put		F	
20 lbs Weight throw	F		

Event schedule
DAY ONE - - SATURDAY, February 7TH
Indoor pentathlon
10:00 AM	W	Pentathlon (60mHH)	Final
11:00 AM	W	Pentathlon (HJ)	Final
12:50 PM	W	Pentathlon (SP)	Final
1:45 PM	W	Pentathlon (LJ)	Final
TBD	W	Pentathlon (800m)	Final
Indoor heptathlon
10:15 AM	M	Heptathlon (60m)	Final
11:00 AM	M	Heptathlon (LJ)	Final
12:00 PM	M	Heptathlon (SP)	Final
1:15 PM	M	Heptathlon (HJ)	Final
DAY TWO -- SUNDAY, February 8TH
9:00 AM	M	Heptathlon (60HH)	Final
10:00 AM	M	Heptathlon (PV)	Final
TBD	M	Heptathlon (1000m)	Final
DAY THREE -- SATURDAY, February 14TH NBC Sports Gold 5:00 GMT
Track Events
Time (GMT)	Men / Women	Event	Division Round
5:10 PM	W	60mH	First round
5:31 PM	M	60mH	First round
5:52 PM	W	60m	First round
6:13 PM	M	60m	First round
6:34 PM	M	3000m RW	Final
6:53 PM	W	800m	First round
7:14 PM	M	800m	First round
7:34 PM	W	400m	First round
7:59 PM	M	400m	First round
8:28 PM	W	3000m	Final
8:45 PM	M	3000m	Final
Field Events
5:30 PM	M	35# Wt. Throw	Final
5:30 PM	W	Triple Jump	Final
6:15 PM	M	Pole Vault	Final
7:10 PM	M	Long Jump	Final
7:20 PM	M	High Jump	Final
7:30 PM	W	Shot Put	Final
DAY FOUR -- SUNDAY, February 15TH NBC Sports 2:00 GMT
Track Events
12:10 PM	W	60mH	Semi-finals
12:25 PM	M	60mH	Semi-finals
12:40 PM	W	60m	Semi-finals
12:55 PM	M	60m	Semi-finals
1:10 PM	Masters W	200m (75+)	Exhibition
1:18 PM	Masters M	200m (75+)	Exhibition
1:26 PM	W	3000m RW	Final
2:05 PM	M	400m	Final - S
2:15 PM	M	400m	Final - F
2:24 PM	W	800m	Final
2:33 PM	M	800m	Final
2:42 PM	W	1500	Final
2:53 PM	W	400m	Final - S
3:02 PM	W	400m	Final - F
3:11 PM	M	1500	Final
3:24 PM	W	60mH	Final
3:33 PM	M	60mH	Final
3:42 PM	W	60m	Final
3:52 PM	M	60m	Final
Field Events
11:00 AM	W	20# Wt. Throw	Final
11:15 AM	W	Long Jump	Final
1:05 PM	W	Pole Vault	Final
1:35 PM	M	Shot Put	Final
1:40 PM	W	High Jump	Final
2:05 PM	M	Triple Jump	Final

== Entry Standards ==
Events in bold will be contested at the Championships.

Men	Women
60 meters 24-3
6.65	7.30
(55m) 6.18	(55m) 6.43
60 m hurdles 24-3
8.00	8.16
(55 m hurdles) 7.40	(55 m hurdles) 7.35
400 meters 20-2
(400 m) 46.80	(400 m) 52.90
800 meters 20-2
(1000 m) 2:22.85	(1000 m) 2:41.50
(800 m) 1:48.75	(800 m) 2:03.00
1500 meters 12-1
(Mile) 3:57.50	(Mile) 4:28.50
(1500 m) 3:40.40	(1500 m) 4:14.00
3000 meters 16-1
(3000 m) 7:55.00	(3000 m) 9:00.00
(5000 m) 13:30.00	(5000 m) 15:30.00
3000 metres race walk 12-1
12:45	14:40
(Mile) 6:25	(Mile) 7:30
(5000 m) 22:00	(5000 m) 24:30
High Jump 16-1
2.15 m (7 ft 1/2 in)	1.85 m (6 ft 3/4 in)
Pole Vault 16-1
5.45 m (17 ft 10 1/2 in)	4.50 m (14 ft 9 in)
Long Jump 16-1
7.60 m (24 ft 11 in)	6.35 m (20 ft 10 in)
Triple Jump 16-1
15.39 m (50 ft 5 3/4 in)	13.35 m (43 ft 9 1/2 in)
Shot Put 16-1
18.90 m (62 ft 0 in)	17.75 m (58 ft 2 3/4 in)
Weight Throw 16-1
20.00 m (65 ft 7 1/4 in)	22.35 m (73 ft 3 3/4 in)
Heptathlon / Pentathlon 12-1
5450 pts	4250 pts
Decathlon 7700 pts	Heptathlon 5900 pts

November 17, 2019 - February 9, 2020 window.

== Medal summary ==
=== Men ===
Event	Gold		Silver		Bronze	
60 metres	Christian Coleman	6.37	Marvin Bracy	6.49	Brandon Carnes	6.53
400 metres	Rashard Clark	45.86	Kyle Clemons	46.00	Eric Fogltanz	46.40
800 metres	Bryce Hoppel	1:46.67	Isaiah Harris	1:47.16	Abraham Alvarado	1:47.86
1500 metres	Josh Thompson	3:44.07	Nicholas Harris	3:44.57	Craig Engels	3:44.62
3000 metres	Paul Chelimo	8:00.14	Anthony Rotich	8:01.91	Hillary Bor	8:01.92
3000 metres race walk	Nick Christie	11:55.44	John Cody Risch	12:08.33	Emmanuel Corvera	12:10.29
60 m hurdles	Aaron Mallett	7.54	Jarret Eaton	7.57	Brendan Ames	7.65
High jump	Erik Kynard	2.26 m (7 ft 4 3/4 in)	Shelby McEwen	2.26 m (7 ft 4 3/4 in)	Keenon Laine	2.23 m (7 ft 3 3/4 in)
High jump	Erik Kynard	2.26 m (7 ft 4 3/4 in)	Shelby McEwen	2.26 m (7 ft 4 3/4 in)	Jeron Robinson	2.23 m (7 ft 3 3/4 in)
Pole vault	Matt Ludwig	5.85 m (19 ft 2 1/4 in)	Branson Ellis	5.80 m (19 ft 1/4 in)	Kyle Pater	5.75 m (18 ft 10 1/4 in)
Pole vault	Matt Ludwig	5.85 m (19 ft 2 1/4 in)	Branson Ellis	5.80 m (19 ft 1/4 in)	Cole Walsh	5.75 m (18 ft 10 1/4 in)
Long jump	KeAndre Bates	7.98 m (26 ft 2 in)	Malik Moffett	7.93 m (26 ft 0 in)	Charles Brown, Jr.	7.91 m (25 ft 11 1/4 in)
Triple jump	Donald Scott	17.24 m (56 ft 6 1/2 in)	Omar Craddock	17.14 m (56 ft 2 3/4 in)	Chris Benard	17.02 m (55 ft 10 in)
Shot put	Ryan Crouser	22.60 m (74 ft 1 3/4 in) CR	Nick Ponzio	20.85 m (68 ft 4 3/4 in)	Payton Otterdahl	20.50 m (67 ft 3 in)
Weight Throw	Conor McCullough	25.31 m (83 ft 1/4 in)	Daniel Haugh	25.04 m (82 ft 1 3/4 in)	Daniel Roberts	24.60 m (80 ft 8 1/2 in)
Heptathlon	Garrett Scantling	6209 points	Scott Filip	5797 points	Jack Flood	5714 points

=== Women ===
Event	Gold		Silver		Bronze	
60 metres	Mikiah Brisco	7.04	Javianne Oliver	7.08	Brianna McNeal	7.17
400 metres	Wadeline Jonathas	51.54	Naasha Robinson	51.98	Quanera Hayes	52.07
800 metres	Ajeé Wilson	2:01.98	Kaela Edwards	2:02.41	Allie Wilson	2:02.99
1500 metres	Shelby Houlihan	4:06.41	Colleen Quigley	4:08.30	Karissa Schweizer	4:08.32
3000 metres	Shelby Houlihan	8:52.03	Karissa Schweizer	8:53.70	Colleen Quigley	8:55.55
3000 metres race walk	Robyn Stevens	13:12.54	Miranda Melville	13:26.37	Maria Michta-Coffey	13:35.56
60 m hurdles	Gabriele Cunningham	7.92	Payton Chadwick	7.94	Tiffani McReynolds	7.96
High jump	Vashti Cunningham	1.97 m (6 ft 5 1/2 in)	Amina Smith	1.90 m (6 ft 2 3/4 in)	Tynita Butts-Townsend	1.87 m (6 ft 1 1/2 in)
Pole vault	Sandi Morris	4.90 m (16 ft 3/4 in)	Jenn Suhr	4.85 m (15 ft 10 3/4 in)	Olivia Gruver	4.70 m (15 ft 5 in)
Long jump	Quanesha Burks	6.76 m (22 ft 2 in)	Kate Hall	6.69 m (21 ft 11 1/4 in)	Kendell Williams	6.61 m (21 ft 8 in)
Triple jump (Note: Keturah Orji set the American record 14.60 m (47 ft 10 3/4 in) in the second round. Tori Franklin then improved upon the record to 14.64 m (48 ft 1/4 in) in the sixth round.)	Tori Franklin	14.64 m (48 ft 1/4 in) NR	Keturah Orji	14.60 m (47 ft 10 3/4 in)	Imani Oliver	13.80 m (45 ft 3 1/4 in)
Shot put	Chase Ealey	18.99 m (62 ft 3 1/2 in)	Haley Teel	18.40 m (60 ft 4 1/4 in)	Maggie Ewen	18.05 m (59 ft 2 1/2 in)
Weight Throw	Janeah Stewart	24.62 m (80 ft 9 1/4 in)	Alyssa Wilson	22.80 m (74 ft 9 1/2 in)	Erin Reese	22.76 m (74 ft 8 in)
Pentathlon	Annie Kunz	4610 points	Emilyn Dearman	4451 points	Shaina Burns	4375 points

== Qualification ==
The 2020 USA Indoor Track and Field Championships serve as the qualification meet for United States representatives in international competitions, including the 2020 IAAF World Indoor Championships from 13 to 15 March 2020 in Nanjing, China. In order to be entered, athletes need to achieve a qualifying standard mark and place in the top 2 in their event and top 12 in the world. The United States team, as managed by USATF, can also bring a qualified back up athlete in case one of the team members is unable to perform.

Additionally, defending 2019 IAAF World Indoor Tour Winner (received a wildcard spot subject to ratification by their country) and World Champions received byes into the 2020 World Championships. The athletes eligible for a bye are:

=== Defending World Champions ===
- Courtney Okolo - 400 m
- Will Claye - Triple Jump
- Christian Coleman - 60 m
- Kendra Harrison - 60 m hurdles
- Sandi Morris - Pole Vault

=== Defending World Tour Winner ===
- Nathan Strother - 400 m
- Jarret Eaton - 60 m hurdles
