= Georgia Bulldogs women's track and field =

- Founded: 1980
- University: University of Georgia
- Head coach: Caryl Smith-Gilbert (4th season)
- Conference: SEC
- Location: Athens, Georgia, US
- Outdoor track: Spec Towns Track (Capacity: 1,000)
- Nickname: Bulldogs
- Colors: Red and black

Conference Indoor Championships
- 2006

Conference Outdoor Championships
- 1995, 2006, 2025

Women Indoor National Championships
- 2018, 2026

Women Outdoor National Championships
- 2025, 2026

The Georgia Bulldogs women's track and field team represents University of Georgia in NCAA Division I women's indoor and outdoor track and field.

== Facility ==
Spec Towns Track is the practice and competition stadium for the UGA track & field teams. In 2023, the University of Georgia announced plans to build a new track and field complex.

== Notable athletes ==
In 2018, Keturah Orji became the first Bulldog to win The Bowerman, an award that honors collegiate track & field's most outstanding athlete of the year. Orji was also the first three-time finalist for the award.

Two UGA women's track and field athletes have won the Honda Sports Award, Kendell Williams in 2017 and Aaliyah Butler in 2025.

=== Olympic medalists ===
Name	Country	Olympiad	Event	Result	Medal
Gwen Torrence	United States	1992 Barcelona	200 meters	21.81	Gold
Gwen Torrence	United States	1992 Barcelona	4x100 meter relay	41.11	Gold
Gwen Torrence	United States	1992 Barcelona	4x400 meter relay	3:20.92	Silver
Gwen Torrence	United States	1996 Atlanta	4x100 meter relay	41.95	Gold
Gwen Torrence	United States	1996 Atlanta	100 meters	10.96	Bronze
Debbie Ferguson-McKenzie	Bahamas	1996 Atlanta	4x100 meter relay	42.14	Silver
Debbie Ferguson-McKenzie	Bahamas	2000 Sydney	4x100 meter relay	41.95	Gold
Debbie Ferguson-McKenzie	Bahamas	2004 Athens	200 meters	22.30	Bronze
Hyleas Fountain	United States	2008 Beijing	Women's heptathlon	6,619 Points	Silver
Shaunae Miller-Uibo	Bahamas	2016 Rio de Janeiro	400 meters	49.44	Gold
Shaunae Miller-Uibo	Bahamas	2021 Tokyo	400 meters	48.36	Gold
Lynna Irby	United States	2021 Tokyo	4x400 meter relay	3:18.85	Gold
Lynna Irby	United States	2021 Tokyo	Mixed 4x400 meter relay	3:10.22	Bronze
Aaliyah Butler	United States	2024 Paris	4x400 meter relay	3:15.27	Gold

== History ==
=== SEC & NCAA Championship Meet Finishes ===
Georgia Bulldogs Women's Track and Field
Year	Head coach	SEC Indoor		NCAA Indoor		SEC Outdoor		NCAA Outdoor	
Year	Head coach	Place	Points	Place	Points	Place	Points	Place	Points
1980	Bill Katz	—N/a	—N/a	—N/a	—N/a	—N/a	—N/a	—N/a	—N/a
1981	Bill Katz	—N/a	—N/a	—N/a	—N/a	4	54	—N/a	—N/a
1982	Steve Sitler	-	—N/a	—N/a	—N/a	5	50	—N/a	—N/a
1983	Steve Sitler	5	60	10T	10	5	58	32	13
1984	Steve Sitler	2	89	9	11	3	62	28T	19
1985	Mike Sheeley	5	35	20T	8	4	71	23T	11
1986	Mike Sheeley	5	53.3	12T	10	5	67	11	19
1987	Mike Sheeley	5	58	13T	10	5	38	13T	20
1988	Lewis Gainey	7	33	NTS	NTS	6	35	NTS	NTS
1989	Lewis Gainey	7	16	NTS	NTS	6	54	14T	15
1990	John Mitchell	7	17	45T	1	NTS	NTS	NTS	NTS
1991	John Mitchell	7	12	NTS	NTS	5	50	32	7
1992	John Mitchell	7	30	NTS	NTS	7	42.5	NTS	NTS
1993	John Mitchell	7	49	NTS	NTS	7	45	NTS	NTS
1994	John Mitchell	9	24.33	27T	7	6	53	NTS	NTS
1995	John Mitchell	2	96.5	7	20	1	135.5	3	41.3
1996	John Mitchell	3	83.5	2	34	4	88	12	21
1997	John Mitchell	6	35	NTS	NTS	6	65	56T	2
1998	John Mitchell	7	50	8	1	3	103	6	32
1999	John Mitchell	6	44	18	10	4	107.5	4	37
2000	Wayne Norton	5	62	42	4	5	85	19	12
2001	Wayne Norton	5	61.5	13	14.5	7	55	25	10.6
2002	Wayne Norton	6	26	NTS	NTS	7	49	45T	4
2003	Wayne Norton	6	55.5	36T	4	6	66	11	22
2004	Wayne Norton	4	81	6	36	3	101.5	7	24
2005	Wayne Norton	6	54	12	16.5	4	106.2	6	28
2006	Wayne Norton	1	101.5	5T	27	1	136*	9	25.75
2007	Wayne Norton	2	103	4	28	3	106	9	24
2008	Wayne Norton	10	14.5	NTS	NTS	10	32	60T	2
2009	Wayne Norton	11	14	NTS	NTS	9	45.5	NTS	NTS
2010	Wayne Norton	5	65.5	42T	4	5	74.5	26T	10
2011	Wayne Norton	6	54	NTS	NTS	4	94	40T	6
2012	Wayne Norton	5	52	28T	8	4	108	21T	14
2013	Wayne Norton	5	52.5	10	22	5	87	11T	25
2014	Wayne Norton	5	64.5	3T	40.5	5	70.5	5	35
2015	Wayne Norton	6	50	3	37	6	64	5	41
2016	Petros Kyprianou	3	65	3	45	8	59	3	41
2017	Petros Kyprianou	4	64	2	51	4	77	2	62.2
2018	Petros Kyprianou	2	84.5	1	61	8	61	2	52
2019	Petros Kyprianou	7	49	20	11	10	42.5	66T	1
2020	Petros Kyprianou	N/A	N/A	N/A	N/A	N/A	N/A	N/A	N/A
2021	Petros Kyprianou	3	69	5	31	5	64	3	37.5
2022	Caryl Smith-Gilbert	9	23	46	2.2	10	33.5	45T	4
2023	Caryl Smith-Gilbert	6	53	5	31	6	57	10T	19
2024	Caryl Smith-Gilbert	6	47	3	33	5	72	10T	25
2025	Caryl Smith-Gilbert	4	57	2	33	1	103	1	73
2026	Caryl Smith-Gilbert	3	68	1	45	3	90	1	50

=== NCAA Championship Meet Individual Event Champions ===
Georgia Bulldogs Women's Individual Event Champions
Year	Name	Country	Meet	Event	Result
2026	Adaejah Hodge	British Virgin Islands	2026 Outdoor Championships	200 m	21.68
2026	Dejanea Oakley	Jamaica	2026 Outdoor Championships	400 m	48.79
2026	Adaejah Hodge	British Virgin Islands	2026 Indoor Championships	200 m	22.22
2026	Dejanea Oakley	Jamaica	2026 Indoor Championships	400 m	50.47
2025	Elena Kulichenko	Cyprus	2025 Outdoor Championships	High jump	1.96 m (6 ft 5 in)
2025	Stephanie Ratcliffe	Australia	2025 Outdoor Championships	Hammer throw	71.37 m (234 ft 1 3/4 in)
2025	Aaliyah Butler	(United States) USA	2025 Outdoor Championships	400 m	49.26
2024	Elena Kulichenko	Cyprus	2024 Outdoor Championships	High jump	1.97 m (6 ft 5 1/2 in)
2021	Marie-Therese Obst	Norway	2021 Outdoor Championships	Javelin throw	59.69 m (195 ft 10 in)
2018	Kate Hall	(United States) USA	2018 Indoor Championships	Long jump	6.73 m (22 ft 3/4 in)
2018	Keturah Orji	(United States) USA	2018 Indoor Championships	Triple jump	14.04 m (46 ft 3/4 in)
2018	Lynna Irby	(United States) USA	2018 Outdoor Championships	400 m	49.80
2018	Keturah Orji	(United States) USA	2018 Outdoor Championships	Long jump	6.67 m (21 ft 10 1/2 in)
2018	Keturah Orji	(United States) USA	2018 Outdoor Championships	Triple jump	14.04 m (46 ft 3/4 in)
2017	Mady Fagan	(United States) USA	2017 Indoor Championships	High jump	1.93 m (6 ft 3 3/4 in)
2017	Keturah Orji	(United States) USA	2017 Indoor Championships	Triple jump	14.11 m (46 ft 3 1/2 in)
2017	Kendell Williams	(United States) USA	2017 Indoor Championships	Pentathlon	4682
2017	Mady Fagan	(United States) USA	2017 Outdoor Championships	High jump	1.91 m (6 ft 3 in)
2017	Kate Hall	(United States) USA	2017 Outdoor Championships	Long jump	6.73 m (22 ft 3/4 in)
2017	Keturah Orji	(United States) USA	2017 Outdoor Championships	Triple jump	14.29 m (46 ft 10 1/2 in)
2017	Kendell Williams	(United States) USA	2017 Outdoor Championships	Heptathlon	6265
2016	Kendell Williams	(United States) USA	2016 Indoor Championships	Pentathlon	4703 (Collegiate Record)
2016	Keturah Orji	(United States) USA	2016 Indoor Championships	Triple jump	14.12 m (46 ft 3 3/4 in)
2016	Keturah Orji	(United States) USA	2016 Outdoor Championships	Triple jump	14.53 m (47 ft 8 in) (Collegiate Record)
2016	Kendell Williams	(United States) USA	2016 Outdoor Championships	Heptathlon	6225
2016	Chanice Porter	Jamaica	2016 Outdoor Championships	Long Jump	6.67 m (21 ft 10 1/2 in)
2015	Keturah Orji	(United States) USA	2015 Outdoor Championships	Triple jump	14.16 m (46 ft 5 1/4 in)
2015	Kendell Williams	(United States) USA	2015 Indoor Championships	Pentathlon	4,678 (collegiate record)
2015	Leontia Kallenou	Cyprus	2015 Indoor Championships	High jump	1.935 m (6 ft 4 in)
2014	Leontia Kallenou	Cyprus	2014 Outdoor Championships	High jump	1.89 m (6 ft 2 1/4 in)
2014	Kendell Williams	(United States) USA	2014 Outdoor Championships	Heptathlon	5,854
2014	Leontia Kallenou	Cyprus	2014 Indoor Championships	High jump	1.87 m (6 ft 1 1/2 in)
2014	Kendell Williams	(United States) USA	2014 Indoor Championships	Pentathlon	4,635 (collegiate record)
2013	Freya Jones	(United Kingdom) UK	2013 Outdoor Championships	Javelin throw	54.945 m (180 ft 3 in)
2013	Shaunae Miller-Uibo	(The Bahamas) Bahamas	2013 Indoor Championships	400 m	50.88
2010	Nikola Lomnicka	Slovakia	2010 Outdoor Championships	Hammer throw	65.56 m (215 ft 1 in)
2007	Jenny Dahlgren	Argentina	2007 Outdoor Championships	Hammer throw	70.715 m (232 ft 0 in)
2007	Patricia Sylvester	Grenada	2007 Indoor Championships	High jump	1.89 m (6 ft 2 1/4 in)
2006	Jenny Dahlgren	Argentina	2006 Outdoor Championships	Hammer throw	68.99 m (226 ft 4 in)
2006	Jenny Dahlgren	Argentina	2006 Indoor Championships	Weight throw	24.045 m (78 ft 10 1/2 in)
2004	Hyleas Fountain	(United States) USA	2004 Outdoor Championships	Long jump	6.615 m (21 ft 8 1/4 in)
2004	Hyleas Fountain	(United States) USA	2004 Indoor Championships	Long jump	6.59 m (21 ft 7 1/4 in)
2004	Hyleas Fountain	(United States) USA	2004 Indoor Championships	Pentathlon	4,412
2004	Fanni Juhász	Hungary	2004 Indoor Championships	Pole vault	4.25 m (13 ft 11 1/4 in)
2003	Hyleas Fountain	(United States) USA	2003 Outdoor Championships	Heptathlon	5,999
2001	Thorey Elisdottir	Iceland	2001 Indoor Championships	Pole vault	4.51 m (14 ft 9 1/2 in)
1999	Vigdis Guðjónsdóttir	Iceland	1999 Outdoor Championships	Javelin throw	55.55 m (182 ft 3 in)
1999	Debbie Ferguson	(The Bahamas) Bahamas	1999 Indoor Championships	60 m	7.24
1998	Debbie Ferguson	(The Bahamas) Bahamas	1998 Outdoor Championships	100 m	10.94w
1998	Debbie Ferguson	(The Bahamas) Bahamas	1998 Outdoor Championships	200 m	22.66
1996	Debbie Ferguson	(The Bahamas) Bahamas	1996 Indoor Championships	200 m	23.17
1989	Kim Engel	(United States) USA	1989 Outdoor Championships	Javelin throw	59.95 m (196 ft 8 in)
1987	Gwen Torrence	(United States) USA	1987 Outdoor Championships	100 m	11.25
1987	Gwen Torrence	(United States) USA	1987 Outdoor Championships	200 m	22.37
1987	Gwen Torrence	(United States) USA	1987 Indoor Championships	55 m	6.56
1986	Gwen Torrence	(United States) USA	1986 Indoor Championships	55 m	6.62
1984	Linda Detlefsen	(United States) USA	1984 Indoor Championships	1500 m	4:21.32
