= 2019 USA Indoor Track and Field Championships =

Track and field championship

2019 USA Track & Field Indoor Championships
- Dates: February 22–24
- Host city: Staten Island, New York, United States
- Venue: Ocean Breeze Athletic Complex
- Level: Senior
- Type: Indoor
- Events: 30 (men: 15; women: 15)

2019 USA Indoor Track and Field Championships

The 2019 USA Indoor Track and Field Championships were held at the Ocean Breeze Athletic Complex in Staten Island, New York. Organized by USA Track and Field (USATF), the three-day competition took place from February 22 to February 24 and serves as the national championships in track and field for the United States.

== Schedule ==
H	Heats	½	Semi-finals	F	Final
M = morning session, A = afternoon session

Men
Date →	22 February	23 February		24 February	
Event ↓	A	A		A	
60 metres		H		½	F
300 metres		H	F		
600 metres		H		F	
1000 metres		H		F	
Mile				F	
2 Mile		F			
3000 metres race walk		F			
60 metres hurdles		H		½	F
High jump		F			
Pole vault		F			
Long jump		F			
Triple jump				F	
Shot put		F			
35 lbs Weight throw	F				
Heptathlon	F				

Women
Date →	22 February	23 February		24 February	
Event ↓	A	A		A	
60 metres		H		½	F
300 metres		H	F		
600 metres		H		F	
1000 metres		H		F	
Mile		F			
2 Mile				F	
3000 metres race walk				F	
60 metres hurdles		H		½	F
High jump		F			
Pole vault				F	
Long jump		F			
Triple jump				F	
Shot put				F	
20 lbs Weight throw	F				
Pentathlon	F				

== Entry Standards ==
Events in bold will be contested at the Championships.
Events listed directly below those being contested may be used as alternates for qualifying.
Qualifying window: November 16, 2018 – February 17, 2019
Combined Events qualifying window: January 5, 2018 – February 17, 2019

Men	Women
60 meters
6.70	7.55
(55m) 6.23	(55m) 6.85
300 meters
33.49	39.00
(200 m) 21.20	(200 m) 23.75
(400 m) 47.40	(400 m) 54.00
600 meters
1:18.00	1:33.00
(400 m) 47.40	(400 m) 54.00
(800 m) 1:49.50	(800 m) 2.06.00
1000 meters
2:25.85	2:44.00
(800 m) 1:49.50	(800 m) 2:06.00
Mile
3:58.00	4:35.00
(1500 m) 3:40.40	(1500 m) 4:14.00
2 Mile
8:40.00	10:07.00
(3000 m) 8:01.50	(3000 m) 9:27.00
(5000 m) 13:30.00	(5000 m) 16:18.50
3000 metres race walk
12:45	14:40
(Mile) 6:25	(Mile) 7:30
(5000 m) 22:00	(5000 m) 24:30
60 m hurdles
8.35	8.00
(55 m hurdles) 7.55	(55 m hurdles) 7.40
High Jump
2.15 m (7 ft 1/2 in)	1.81 m (5 ft 11 1/4 in)
Pole Vault
5.45 m (17 ft 10 1/2 in)	4.50 m (14 ft 9 in)
Long Jump
7.60 m (24 ft 11 in)	6.25 m (20 ft 6 in)
Triple Jump
15.39 m (50 ft 5 3/4 in)	12.80 m (41 ft 11 3/4 in)
Shot Put
18.90 m (62 ft 0 in)	17.00 m (55 ft 9 1/4 in)
Weight Throw
21.50 m (70 ft 6 1/4 in)	20.00 m (65 ft 7 1/4 in)
Heptathlon / Pentathlon
5450 pts	4250 pts
	Heptathlon 5900 pts

== Medal summary ==
=== Men ===
Event	Gold		Silver		Bronze	
60 meters	Demek Kemp	6.55	Cordero Gray	6.59	Sean McLean	6.63
300 meters	Dontavius Wright	32.89 s	Manteo Mitchell	33.54 s	Brycen Spratling	33.59 s
600 meters	Donavan Brazier	1:13.77 WB	Sam Ellison	1:15.20	Kameron Jones	1:15.32
1000 meters	Clayton Murphy	2:20.36	Abraham Alvarado	2:21.08	Brannon Kidder	2:21.23
Mile	Craig Engels	3:59.69	Henry Wynne	4:00.20	John Gregorek Jr.	4:00.26
Two miles	Drew Hunter	8:25.29 CR	Eric Avila	8:32.41	Tripp Hurt	8:32.72
3000 metres race walk	Nick Christie	11:35.34	Emmanuel Corvera	11:49.25	John Cody Risch	11:57.26
60 m hurdles	Devon Allen	7.60	Aaron Mallett	7.64	Joshua Thompson	7.69
High jump	Jeron Robinson	2.24 m (7 ft 4 in)	Avion Jones	2.21 m (7 ft 3 in)	Kristopher Kornegay-Gober	2.18 m (7 ft 1 3/4 in)
Pole vault	Andrew Irwin	5.80 m (19 ft 1/4 in)	Scott Houston	5.61 m (18 ft 4 3/4 in)	Max Babits	5.51 m (18 ft 3/4 in)
Long jump	Jordan Downs	7.73 m (25 ft 4 1/4 in)	Malik Moffett	7.69 m (25 ft 2 3/4 in)	Josh Colley	7.53 m (24 ft 8 1/4 in)
Triple jump	Donald Scott	16.85 m (55 ft 3 1/4 in)	Chris Carter	16.66 m (54 ft 7 3/4 in)	KeAndre Bates	16.38 m (53 ft 8 3/4 in)
Shot put	Ryan Crouser	22.22 m (72 ft 10 3/4 in)	Joe Kovacs	21.40 m (70 ft 2 1/2 in)	Josh Awotunde	20.63 m (67 ft 8 in)
Weight Throw	Daniel Haugh	24.12 m (79 ft 1 1/2 in)	Conor McCullough	23.98 m (78 ft 8 in)	Alex Young	23.67 m (77 ft 7 3/4 in)
Heptathlon	Tim Ehrhardt	5868 points	Solomon Simmons	5766 points	Jack Flood	5701 points
Masters exhibition 60 m	Anthony Searles	8.08	Stephen Gould	8.09	Steven Snow	8.24
CHSAA exhibition 4 × 800 m						

=== Women ===
Event	Gold		Silver		Bronze	
60 meters	Shania Collins	7.16	Kate Hall	7.23	Sharika Nelvis	7.32
300 meters	Brittany Brown	35.95 CR	Gabby Thomas	35.98	Kayla Davis	37.46
600 meters	Athing Mu	1:23.57 AR WL	Raevyn Rogers	1:24.88	Olivia Baker	1:26.93
1000 meters	Ajeé Wilson	2:34.71 CR WL	Hanna Green	2:35.40	Ce'Aira Brown	2:35.62
Mile run	Colleen Quigley	4:29.47	Shelby Houlihan	4:29.92	Cory McGee	4:30.14
Two miles	Shelby Houlihan	9:31.38 WL	Katie Mackey	9:33.70	Elinor Purrier	9:34.65
3000 metres race walk	Miranda Melville	12:57.58	Katie Burnett	13:14.09	Kayla Shapiro	14:11.84
60 m hurdles	Sharika Nelvis	7.85 WL	Evonne Britton	7.86	Amber Hughes	8.06
High jump	Vashti Cunningham	1.96 m (6 ft 5 in)	Ty Butts	1.88 m (6 ft 2 in)	Amina Smith	1.88 m (6 ft 2 in)
Pole vault	Katie Nageotte	4.81 m (15 ft 9 1/4 in)	Annie Rhodes	4.56 m (14 ft 11 1/2 in)	Kristen Leland	4.56 m (14 ft 11 1/2 in)
Long jump	Kate Hall	6.51 m (21 ft 4 1/4 in)	Quanesha Burks	6.39 m (20 ft 11 1/2 in)	Kenyattia Hackworth	6.39 m (20 ft 11 1/2 in)
Triple jump	Keturah Orji	14.55 m (47 ft 8 3/4 in)	Tori Franklin	14.45 m (47 ft 4 3/4 in)	Lynnika Pitts	13.66 m (44 ft 9 3/4 in)
Shot put	Chase Ealey	18.62 m (61 ft 1 in)	Magdalyn Ewen	18.45 m (60 ft 6 1/4 in)	Jessica Ramsey	18.37 m (60 ft 3 in)
Weight Throw	Janeah Stewart	24.80 m (81 ft 4 1/4 in)	DeAnna Price	24.52 m (80 ft 5 1/4 in)	Kaitlyn Long	23.19 m (76 ft 3/4 in)
Pentathlon	Kendell Williams	4496 points	Emilyn Dearman	4356 points	Anna Hall	4302 points
Masters exhibition 60 m	Cheryl Bellaire	9.71	Susan Loyd	9.80	Leandra Funk	9.82

== Qualification ==
The 2020 USA Indoor Track and Field Championships serve as the qualification meet for United States representatives in international competitions, including the 2020 IAAF World Indoor Championships. In order to be entered, athletes need to achieve a qualifying standard mark and place in the top 2 in their event and top 12 in the world. The United States team, as managed by USATF, can also bring a qualified back up athlete in case one of the team members is unable to perform.

Additionally, defending 2019 IAAF World Indoor Tour Winner (received a wildcard spot subject to ratification by their country) and World Champions received byes into the 2020 World Championships. The athletes eligible for a bye are:

=== Defending World Champions ===
- Courtney Okolo – 400 m
- Will Claye – Triple jump
- Christian Coleman – 60 m
- Kendra Harrison – 60 m hurdles
- Sandi Morris – Pole vault

=== Defending World Tour Winner ===
- Nathan Strother – 400 m
- Jarret Eaton – 60 m hurdles
