= Allie Wilson =

American middle-distance runner (born 1996)

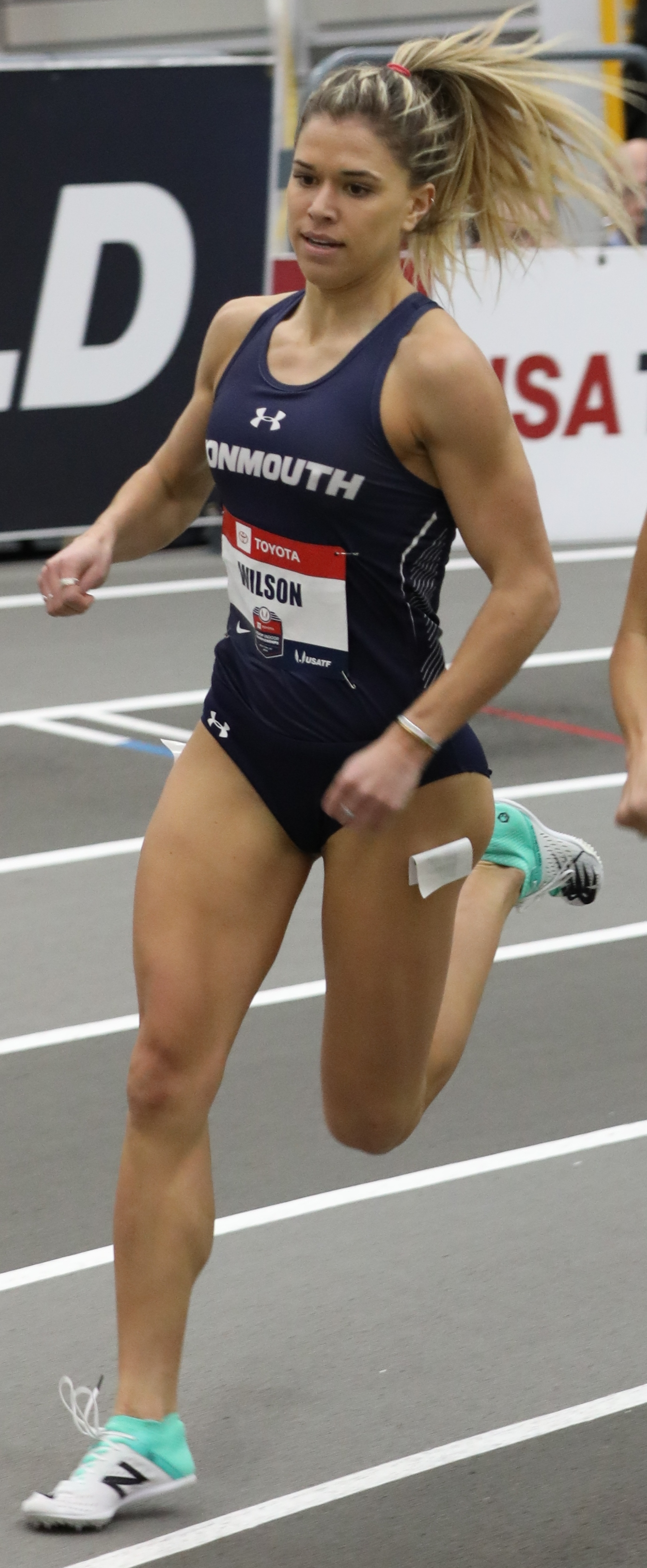
- Wilson at the 2019 USA Indoor Track and Field Championships

Personal information
- Nationality: United States
- Born: March 31, 1996 (age 30)
- Home town: Wallingford, Pennsylvania
- Education: Strath Haven High School; Monmouth University
- Height: 5 ft 6 in (168 cm)

Sport
- Sport: Athletics
- Event: 800 metres
- College team: Monmouth Hawks
- Club: Heartland Track Club
- Coached by: Chris Tarello; Amy Yoder Begley

Achievements and titles
- National finals: 2019 USA Indoors; • 1000m, 6th; 2019 NCAA Indoors; • 800m, 4th; 2019 NCAAs; • 800m, 5th; 2020 USA Indoors; • 800m, 3rd (bronze); 2021 USA Champs; • 800m, 6th; 2022 USA Road Mile; • Road mile, 4th; 2022 USA Champs; • 800m, 4th; 2023 USA Indoors; • 800m, 2nd (silver); 2024 USA Indoors; • 800m, 1st (gold)
- Personal bests: 800m: 1:57.52 (London 2024); 1000m: 2:35.42 (Louisville 2024); 1500m: 4:04.02 (Memphis 2022); Mile: 4:26.04 (Los Angeles 2022)
Medal record
Women's athletics
Representing United States
NACAC Championships
Silver medal – second place	2022 Freeport	800 m
- Updated on January 1, 2024

Allie Wilson (born March 31, 1996) is an American middle-distance runner specializing in the 800 metres. She was the 2024 USA Indoor Track and Field Championships winner in the 800 m.

Her first major breakthrough came in 2018 during her third year at Monmouth University, advancing from 2:11 to a 2:04 best in the 800 m and qualifying for her first NCAA Championships. After a best finish of 5th at the 2019 NCAA finals, Wilson signed as a professional with the Atlanta Track Club coached by Amy Yoder Begley and her husband Andrew. She went on to finish sixth at the Olympic Trials and fourth at the 2022 U.S. championships, just one spot away from making a U.S. global championship team. At the 2022 NACAC Championships, she won the silver medal in the 800 metres.

== Early life ==
Wilson is from Wallingford, Pennsylvania, where she attended Strath Haven High School. She started running the 800 m in 2005, under the Catholic Youth Organization at St. John Chrysostom Catholic Church.

At Strath Haven, she split her fall seasons between cross country running and soccer while working as a lifeguard. She was the Delaware County Daily Times 2013 Girls' Soccer Player of the Year, and was considered the best defender in Delaware County. Despite getting offers from NCAA Division I schools to run cross country and track, Wilson said that soccer was her "main sport".

In 2014, Wilson's Strath Haven team qualified for the Penn Relays Championship of America in the 4 × 800 metres relay for the fifth year in a row, with the help of Wilson splitting 2:17 on the third leg. The team's best finish in the Championship of America finals was 4th, at the 2011 edition when both Wilson and her sister Val split 2:15 on the first and second legs.

== Collegiate career ==
From fall 2014 to spring 2019, Wilson ran for the Monmouth Hawks track and field program, coached by Chris Tarello. She failed to qualify for the NCAA championships her freshman and second years, and during her junior year she experienced a fifth metatarsal fracture on her foot after jumping into a swimming pool.

After recovering, she qualified for the 2018 NCAA Division I Outdoor Track and Field Championships at the 2018 NCAA East regional in Tampa, Florida. Running from the second heat, both Wilson and competitor Laurie Barton split 2:04.58 tying for the final qualifying spot, a difference that was later resolved in Wilson's favor by just 0.001 seconds. In Eugene, Wilson finish just 7th in her semi-final and did not make the finals, although her time of 2:05.55 would have advanced if she had been placed in the third heat. During the 2018 season overall, Wilson improved her personal bests from 2:11 and 4:33 in the 800 m and 1500 m to 2:04 and 4:22 respectively.

On February 8, 2019 at the Boston University Valentine Invitational, Wilson ran an 800 m personal best of 2:02.65, the number 2 time in the NCAA that season. Wilson competed in her first senior national championship at the 2019 USA Indoor Track and Field Championships, while still a college senior. Racing the rarely-run 1000 metres event, she qualified for the finals and finished 6th overall in a time of 2:41.76. Later that season at the 2019 NCAA Division I Indoor Track and Field Championships, Wilson improved upon her placing to finish 4th in the finals. In doing so, she became the first Monmouth Hawk to finish top-8 at an NCAA Division I Women's Indoor Track and Field Championships.

At the 2019 NCAA Division I Outdoor Track and Field Championships, Wilson again qualified for the finals of the 800 m with the 3rd-fastest overall time in the semi-finals. In the finals, she ran another personal best of 2:02.56 for 5th place. The time was the fastest in Monmouth program history.

== Professional career ==
=== 2019-2020 ===
While in college, Wilson was an intern for the Shore Athletic Club, her first experience with a professional team. On July 30, 2019, Wilson signed with the Atlanta Track Club to be coached under Amy Yoder Begley and her husband Andrew Begley. She was inspired to join by Monmouth teammate and 2015 NCAA runner-up Dylan Capwell, who had signed with the Atlanta TC earlier.

During her first championships as a professional at the 2020 USA Indoor Track and Field Championships, Wilson finished 3rd – her first national medal. Wilson was scheduled to run in nine different meetings before the 2020 United States Olympic trials, but the postponement of the Olympics due to COVID-19 changed her plans.

=== 2021 ===
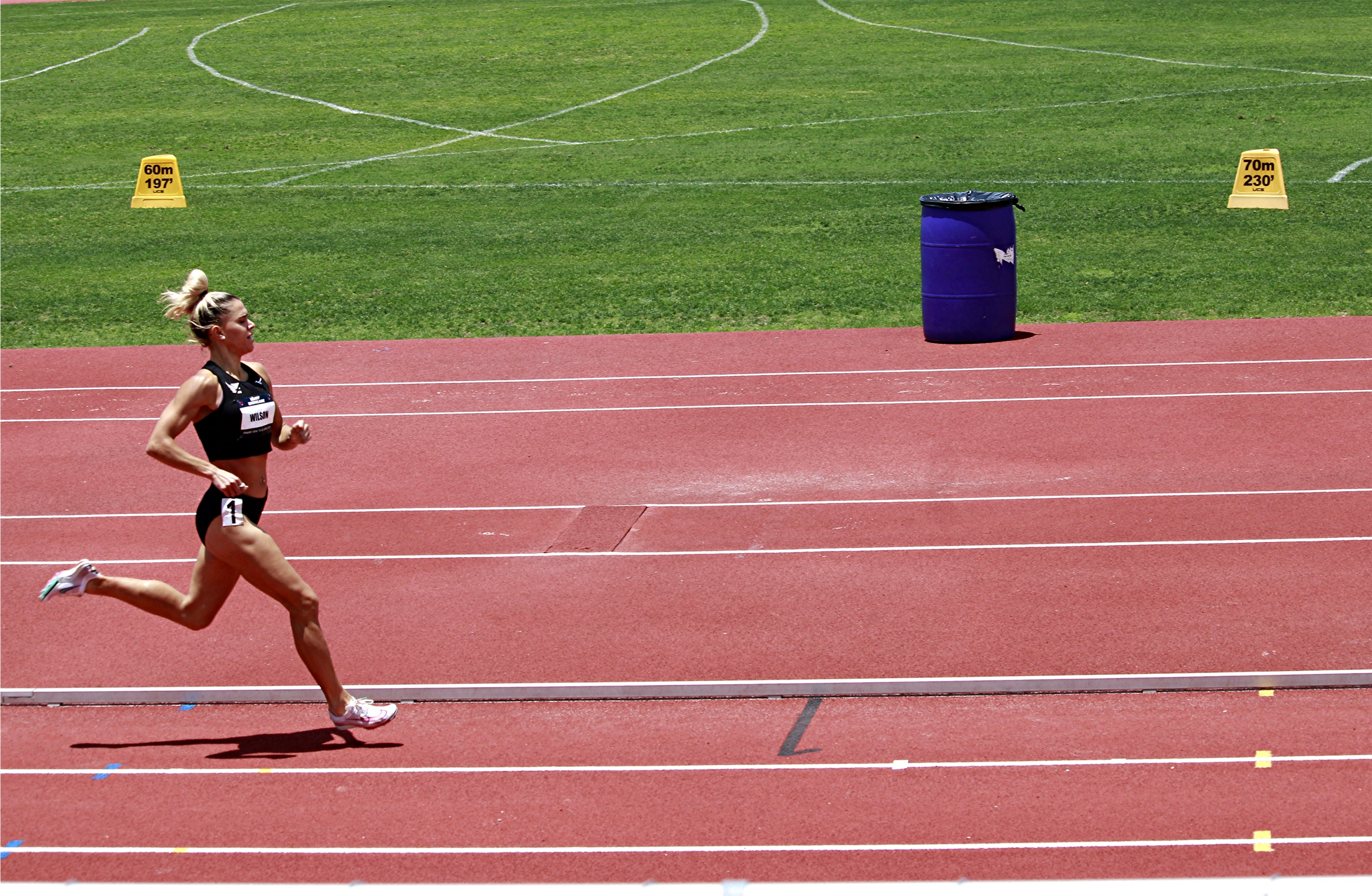
Wilson at the Panther Stadium at Blackshear Field in 2021

Wilson broke the 800 m two-minute barrier for the first time on May 15, 2021 at the Sound Running Track Meet in Irvine, California, with a time of 1:59.68 behind only Laura Muir. At the postponed 2021 United States Olympic trials in Eugene, Oregon, Wilson placed 2nd in her heat and 3rd in her semi-final, advancing to her first Olympic Trials final.

Hot conditions in Eugene led to a delay in the event schedule – it was 109 °F (43 °C) at 4:30 pm local time when the finals were originally set to be held, and a thermometer held to the track surface read 148.1 °F (64.5 °C). Though the temperature dropped to 93 °F (34 °C) by the time of the delayed start, the relative heat and nighttime conditions were still an adjustment for the athletes. Led by Athing Mu, the opening pace was very fast. Wilson was in eighth place after 200 metres, and seventh place at 400 m. After falling back to eighth place at 600 m, Wilson rallied to finish sixth overall in a new personal best of 1:59.02 despite the heat. All five runners ahead of her also set lifetime bests in the race, and as only the top three were selected, Wilson did not qualify for the 2021 U.S. Olympic team.

=== 2022 ===
At the 2022 Sound Running Track Meet, Wilson ran another personal best of 1:58.18, surpassing the 2022 World Athletics Championships minimum qualifying standard while stumbling and falling at the finish line. At the 2022 USA Outdoor Track and Field Championships, Wilson advanced to the finals and all eight finalists were within four metres of each other with 200 m to go, hitting the 600 m mark in 1:28.58. Wilson ended up finishing fourth in 1:58.35, missing out on qualifying for the U.S. Worlds team by just one spot. As a consolation, Wilson was offered a spot on the 2022 NACAC Championships U.S. squad, where she won the silver medal in a photo finish with gold medalist Ajeé Wilson.

=== 2023 ===
Wilson had a successful early 2023 season, beginning with her appearance at the 2023 USA Indoor Track and Field Championships in the 800 m. After Laurie Barton set the pace through 400 m in 59.09 seconds, Kaela Edwards took over at 600 m. Both Nia Akins and Wilson moved to pass Edwards, but Akins' final lap of 29.71 seconds beat Wilson's of 29.83 seconds, earning Akins the gold and Wilson the silver medal.

During the outdoor season, Wilson won the 2023 Penn Relays Olympic Development 800 m in a time of 2:01.13, under "incessant" rain. At the 2023 USA Outdoor Track and Field Championships, Wilson finished 4th in her semi-final behind Ajeé Wilson, and she did not qualify for the U.S. team at the 2023 World Championships.

=== 2024 ===
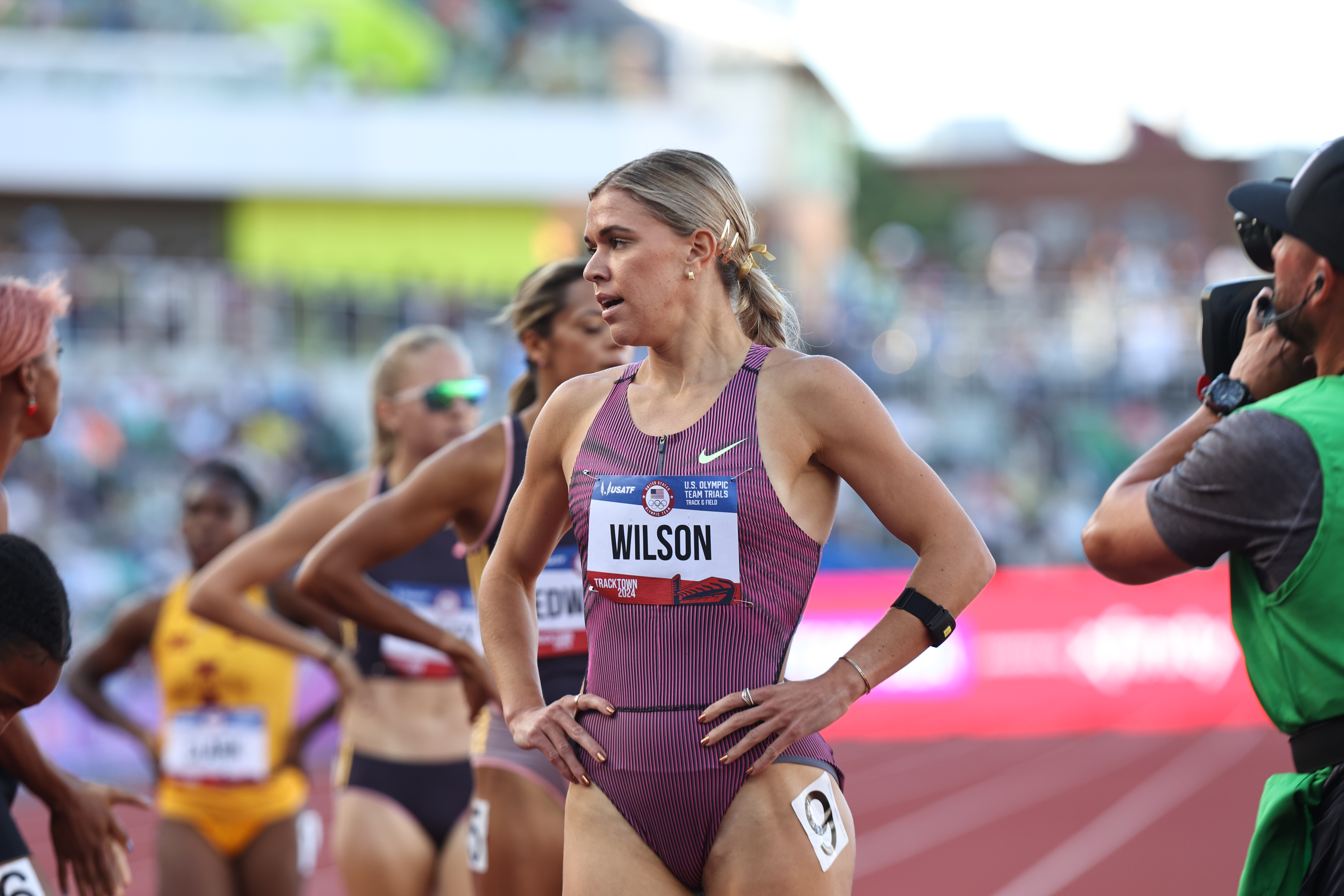
Wilson at the 2024 US Olympic Trials

Before she started her 2024 season, Wilson and her coach Amy Yoder Begley left the Atlanta Track Club, becoming an unsponsored athlete. The two relocated to Indianapolis, Indiana and started Heartland Track Club coached by Amy's Husband, Andrew Begley. After narrowly losing to Olivia Baker at the Dr. Sander Invite, Wilson won the 2024 Millrose Games 800 m, this time beating Baker by 0.3 seconds.

At the 2024 USA Indoor Track and Field Championships finals, Addy Wiley in her first championships as a professional took the lead, but Wilson passed her in the final 50 metres to win her first national title.

=== International competitions ===
Representing the United States
Year	Competition	Venue	Position	Event	Time
2024	World Athletics Indoor Championships	Glasgow, Scotland	14th	800m	2:01.66
2024	Olympic Games	Paris, France	28th	800m	1:59.73

=== National championships ===
Year	Competition	Venue	Position	Event	Time
2020	USATF Indoor Championships	Albuquerque, New Mexico	3rd	800m	2:02.99
2021	USATF 1 Mile Road Championships	Des Moines, Iowa	9th	mile	4:38.50
2021	USA Olympic Trials	Eugene, Oregon	6th	800m	1:59.02
2022	USATF 1 Mile Road Championships	Des Moines, Iowa	4th	mile	4:37.0
2022	USATF Outdoor Championships	Eugene, Oregon	4th	800m	1:58.35
2023	USATF Indoor Championships	Albuquerque, New Mexico	2nd	800m	2:00.33
2023	USATF Outdoor Championships	Eugene, Oregon	9th	800m	2:01.02
2024	USATF Indoor Championships	Albuquerque, New Mexico	1st	800m	2:00.63
2024	USA Olympic Trials	Eugene, Oregon	2nd	800m	1:58.32

== Statistics ==
=== Personal bests ===
Event	Mark	Place	Competition	Venue	Date	Ref
600 metres	1:26.40 sh	3rd place, bronze medalist(s)	Millrose Games	New York City	February 11, 2023	
800 metres	1:57.52	7th	Anniversary Games	London, United Kingdom	July 20, 2024	
1000 metres	2:36.31 sh	2nd place, silver medalist(s)	Terrier Classic	Boston, Massachusetts	January 28, 2023	
1500 metres	4:04.02	3rd place, bronze medalist(s)	Ed Murphey Classic	Memphis, Tennessee	July 29, 2022	
Mile run	4:26.04	2nd place, silver medalist(s)	Occidental College Sunset Tour	Eagle Rock, California	July 9, 2022	
