= Amber Hughes =

American triple jumper and hurdler

Personal information
- Nationality: American
- Born: 23 September 1994 (age 31)
- Home town: Atlanta, Georgia
- Height: 5 ft 9 in (1.75 m)

Sport
- Sport: Athletics
- Events: 100 metres hurdles, 100 metres
- College team: Tennessee State Lady Tigers
- Now coaching: Georgia State Panthers

Achievements and titles
- National finals: 2016 NCAA Indoors; • Triple jump, 4th; 2016 NCAAs; • Triple jump, 18th; 2016 USA Champs; • Triple jump, 17th; 2017 NCAA Indoors; • Triple jump, 11th; 2017 NCAAs; • Triple jump, 7th; 2017 USA Champs; • Triple jump, 5th; 2019 USA Indoors; • 60m hurdles, 3rd (bronze); 2023 USA Indoors; • 60m hurdles, 3rd (bronze)
- Personal bests: 100mH: 12.68 (+1.6) (2023); 100m: 11.40 (−1.5) (2023); TJ: 13.62m (+0.5) (2017)

Amber Hughes (born 23 September 1994), is an American triple jumper and hurdler. She is a two-time national championship third-place finisher indoors in the hurdles, at the 2019 and 2023 championships.

== Biography ==
Hughes was raised in Atlanta, Georgia where she attended Douglass High School. As a prep, she was a Georgia state champion in both the triple jump and 100 m hurdles.

In 2013, Hughes joined the Tennessee State Lady Tigers track and field team to compete in the NCAA. Until after her graduation in 2017, Hughes saw most of her success in the triple jump. She was a four-time NCAA finalist in that event, while she only qualified for one NCAA championship in the 100 m hurdles, in 2015 when she did not make the finals.

Hughes made her biggest performance jump in 2017, taking her 100 metres hurdles personal best from 13.12 to 12.74.

In 2019, Hughes secured her first national podium finish, at the 2019 USA Indoor Track and Field Championships where she finished 3rd in a time of 8.06 seconds.

Going into the 2020 Summer Olympics, Hughes was considered a contender to make the U.S. team, but her preparation was impacted by the one-year postponement of the games due to the COVID-19 virus. She competed at the delayed 2020 United States Olympic trials, but did not make the finals.

In 2021, Hughes started coaching for the Georgia State Panthers track and field program handling team operations.

In 2023, Hughes achieved her second national podium finish, placing third at the 2023 USA Indoor Track and Field Championships.

== Statistics ==
=== Personal bests ===
Event	Mark	Competition	Venue	Date
100 metres hurdles	12.68 (+1.6 m/s)	P-T-S Meeting	Banská Bystrica, Slovakia	20 July 2023
100 metres	11.40 (−1.5 m/s)	ATL Open	Atlanta, Georgia	17 June 2023
Triple jump	13.62 m (+0.5 m/s)	North Florida Invitational	Jacksonville, Florida	8 April 2017

=== Circuit performances ===
Grand Slam Track results
Slam	Race group	Event	Pl.	Time	Prize money
2025 Kingston Slam	Short hurdles	100 m hurdles	7th	13.39	US$12,500
2025 Kingston Slam	Short hurdles	100 m	7th	12.32	US$12,500
