= 2013 World Youth Championships in Athletics – Girls' long jump =

Girls' long jump at the 2013 World Youth Championships in Athletics
- Venue: RSC Olimpiyskiy
- Dates: 13 July (qualification); 14 July (final)
- Competitors: 31
- Winning distance: 6.42

Medalists
gold medal	Florentina Marincu	Romania
silver medal	Keturah Orji	United States
bronze medal	Natalia Chacińska	Poland

The girls' long jump at the 2013 World Youth Championships in Athletics was held on 13 and 14 July.

== Medalists ==
Gold	Silver	Bronze
Florentina Marincu; Romania	Keturah Orji; United States	Natalia Chacińska; Poland

== Records ==
Prior to the competition, the following records were as follows.

World Youth Best	Heike Drechsler (GDR)	6.91	Jena, East Germany	9 August 1981
Championship Record	Darya Klishina (RUS)	6.47	Ostrava, Czech Republic	15 July 2007
World Youth Leading	Florentina Marincu (ROU)	6.54	Bucharest, Romania	2 June 2013

== Qualification ==
Qualification rule: 6.00 (Q) or at least 12 best performers (q) qualified.

Rank	Group	Name	Nationality	#1	#2	#3	Result	Notes
1	A	Courtney Corrin	United States	6.31			6.31	Q
2	A	Keturah Orji	United States	5.97	6.25		6.25	Q
3	B	Natalia Chacińska	Poland	5.84	6.19		6.19	Q, PB
4	B	Veronika Šádková	Czech Republic	5.96	5.84	6.13	6.13	Q, PB
5	B	Florentina Marincu	Romania	x	x	6.12	6.12	Q
6	A	Benedetta Cuneo	Italy	6.10			6.10	Q
7	B	Barbora Dvořáková	Czech Republic	x	6.06		6.06	Q, PB
7	B	Janaína Fernandes	Brazil	6.06			6.06	Q, PB
9	B	Kristal Liburd	Saint Kitts and Nevis	6.02			6.02	Q, PB
10	B	Filippa Fotopoulou	Cyprus	5.76	6.00		6.00	Q, PB
11	A	Wang Rong	China	x	x	6.00	6.00	Q
11	B	Nathalie Buschung	Germany	x	6.00		6.00	Q
13	A	Fátima Diame	Spain	x	5.98	x	5.98	
14	B	Darya Dyachenko	Ukraine	4.98	5.01	5.97	5.97	PB
15	A	Magali Roche	Canada	5.81	5.96	5.93	5.96	PB
16	A	Noor Nadia Shahidatun	Malaysia	5.71	5.66	5.95	5.95	
17	B	Léa Fleury	France	5.93	x	x	5.93	
18	B	Emilia Kjellberg	Sweden	3.64	x	5.91	5.91	
19	A	Tamara Moncrieffe	Jamaica	5.46	5.66	5.82	5.82	
20	A	Audrey Kyriacou	Australia	5.75	5.09	x	5.75	
21	B	Saskia Koßmann	Germany	x	5.75	x	5.75	
22	B	Yelyzaveta Babiy	Ukraine	5.67	5.62	x	5.67	
23	A	Evelise Veiga	Portugal	5.61	x	5.63	5.63	
24	A	Yulia Isaeva	Russia	x	x	5.55	5.55	
25	B	Martina Jan	Slovenia	5.46	x	x	5.46	
26	A	Andrea Nuñez	Spain	5.28	5.44	5.26	5.44	
27	A	Rechelle Meade	Anguilla	x	5.44	x	5.44	
	A	Aries Sánchez	Venezuela	x	x	x	NM	
	A	Daisy Isa	Bulgaria	x	x	x	NM	
	B	Zinzi Chabangu	South Africa	x	–	–	NM	
	A	Veronica Ugeh Kasie	Nigeria				DNS	

== Final ==
Rank	Name	Nationality	#1	#2	#3	#4	#5	#6	Result	Notes
1st place, gold medalist(s)	Florentina Marincu	Romania	5.82	5.93	6.42	6.24	x	6.19	6.42	
2nd place, silver medalist(s)	Keturah Orji	United States	6.06	6.20	x	5.83	x	6.39	6.39	PB
3rd place, bronze medalist(s)	Natalia Chacińska	Poland	x	6.10	x	5.75	6.22	6.07	6.22	PB
4	Janaína Fernandes	Brazil	6.03	6.05	5.81	6.11	6.11	6.21	6.21	PB
5	Courtney Corrin	United States	5.85	6.19	5.83	5.65	6.16	x	6.19	
6	Benedetta Cuneo	Italy	x	5.79	6.02	5.92	5.85	6.15	6.15	
7	Nathalie Buschung	Germany	6.01	6.02	6.09	5.63	x	5.76	6.09	PB
8	Veronika Šádková	Czech Republic	x	5.80	6.07	x	5.92	5.92	6.07	
9	Kristal Liburd	Saint Kitts and Nevis	5.54	x	5.94				5.94	
10	Wang Rong	China	5.84	5.93	5.89				5.93	
11	Filippa Fotopoulou	Cyprus	5.93	5.72	x				5.93	
12	Barbora Dvořáková	Czech Republic	5.81	x	5.80				5.81	
