= 2017 NCAA Division I Outdoor Track and Field Championships =

- Edition: 96th (Men); 36th (Women)
- Dates: June 7–10, 2017
- Host city: Eugene, Oregon; University of Oregon
- Venue: Hayward Field
- Events: 42

The 2017 NCAA Division I Outdoor Track and Field Championships were the 96th NCAA Men's Division I Outdoor Track and Field Championships and the 36th NCAA Women's Division I Outdoor Track and Field Championships held for the fifth consecutive year at Hayward Field in Eugene, Oregon on the campus of the University of Oregon. In total, forty-two different men's and women's track and field events were contested from June 7 to June 10, 2017.

== Results ==
=== Men's events ===
==== 100 meters ====
- Only top eight final results shown; no prelims are listed

Wind: -2.1 m/s

Rank	Name	University	Time	Notes
1st place, gold medalist(s)	Christian Coleman	Tennessee	10.04	
2nd place, silver medalist(s)	Cameron Burrell	Houston	10.12	
3rd place, bronze medalist(s)	Christopher Belcher	North Carolina A&T	10.19	
4	Kyree King	Oregon	10.20	
5	Jaylen Bacon	Arkansas State	10.25	
6	(United Kingdom) Nethaneel Mitchell-Blake	LSU	10.26	
7	(Jamaica) Senoj-Jay Givans	Texas	10.29	
8	(Jamaica) Odean Skeen	Auburn	10.97	

==== 200 meters ====
- Only top eight final results shown; no prelims are listed

Wind: -3.1 m/s

Rank	Name	University	Time	Notes
1st place, gold medalist(s)	Christian Coleman	Tennessee	20.25	
2nd place, silver medalist(s)	(United Kingdom) Nethaneel Mitchell-Blake	LSU	20.29	
3rd place, bronze medalist(s)	(Trinidad and Tobago) Jereem Richards	Alabama	20.55	
4	Kyree King	Oregon	20.61	
5	Christopher Belcher	North Carolina A&T	20.66	
6	(Jamaica) Senoj-Jay Givans	Texas	20.76	
7	(The Bahamas) Teray Smith	Auburn	20.77	
8	Jaylen Bacon	Arkansas	20.84	

==== 400 meters ====
- Only top eight final results shown; no prelims are listed

Rank	Name	University	Time	Notes
1st place, gold medalist(s)	Fred Kerley	Texas A&M	44.10	
2nd place, silver medalist(s)	(Jamaica) Nathon Allen	Auburn	44.69	
3rd place, bronze medalist(s)	Michael Cherry	LSU	44.77	
4	Michael Norman	USC	44.88	
5	(Jamaica) Akeem Bloomfield	Auburn	45.13	
6	Marcus Chambers	Oregon	45.28	
7	(Jamaica) Steven Gayle	Alabama	45.59	
8	Wil London	Baylor	45.72	

==== 800 meters ====
- Only top eight final results shown; no prelims are listed

Rank	Name	University	Time	Notes
1st place, gold medalist(s)	(Kenya) Emmanuel Korir	UTEP	1:45.03	
2nd place, silver medalist(s)	Isaiah Harris	Penn State	1:45.40	
3rd place, bronze medalist(s)	Joseph White	Georgetown	1:45.73	
4	(Canada) Robert Heppenstall	Wake Forest	1:46.68	
5	(Puerto Rico) Andrés Arroyo	Florida	1:47.28	
6	Drew Piazza	Virginia Tech	1:47.58	
7	Devin Dixon	Texas A&M	1:49.32	
8	(Kenya) Michael Saruni	UTEP	2:15.56	

==== 1500 meters ====
- Only final results shown; no prelims are listed

Rank	Name	University	Time	Notes
1st place, gold medalist(s)	(United Kingdom) Josh Kerr	New Mexico	3:43.03	
2nd place, silver medalist(s)	(Kenya) Justine Kiprotich	Michigan State	3:43.50	
3rd place, bronze medalist(s)	Craig Engels	Ole Miss	3:43.54	
4	Joshua Thompson	Oklahoma State	3:44.34	
5	(United Kingdom) Neil Gourley	Virginia Tech	3:44.39	
6	Andrew Dusing	Miami (Ohio)	3:44.56	
7	Jeff Thies	Portland	3:44.59	
8	Ben Saarel	Colorado	3:44.78	
9	Vincent Ciattei	Virginia Tech	3:44.83	
10	David Timlin	Indiana State	3:45.41	
11	Blake Haney	Oregon	3:50.51	
12	Craig Nowak	Oklahoma State	3:52.60	

==== 5000 meters ====
- Only top eight final results shown; no prelims are listed

Rank	Name	University	Time	Notes
1st place, gold medalist(s)	Grant Fisher	Stanford	14:35.60	
2nd place, silver medalist(s)	Jack Bruce	Arkansas	14:35.88	
3rd place, bronze medalist(s)	Justyn Knight	Syracuse	14:36.23	
4	Marc Scott	Tulsa	14:36.57	
5	Amon Terer	Campbell	14:36.78	
6	Chartt Miller	Iona	14:36.79	
7	Joe Klecker	Colorado	14:38.03	
8	John Dressel	Colorado	14:38.40	

==== 10000 meters ====
- Only top eight final results shown; no prelims are listed

Rank	Name	University	Time	Notes
1st place, gold medalist(s)	Marc Scott	Tulsa	29:01.54	
2nd place, silver medalist(s)	Rory Linkletter	BYU	29:02.96	
3rd place, bronze medalist(s)	Erik Peterson	Butler	29:04.74	
4	Arsène Guillorel	Samford	29:05.27	
5	Lucas Stalnaker	Navy	29:08.81	
6	Gilbert Kirui	Iona	29:09.42	
7	Matthew Baxter	NAU	29:09.83	
8	Luke Traynor	Tulsa	29:10.58	

==== 110 meters hurdles ====
- Only top eight final results shown; no prelims are listed

Wind: -2.0 m/s

Rank	Name	University	Time	Notes
1st place, gold medalist(s)	Grant Holloway	Florida	13.49	
2nd place, silver medalist(s)	Reuben Walters	Alabama	13.54	
3rd place, bronze medalist(s)	David Kendziera	Illinois	13.59	
4	Aaron Mallett	Iowa	13.65	
5	Nick Anderson	Kentucky	13.66	
6	Marquis Morris	USC	13.75	
7	Desmond Palmer	Pittsburgh	14.00	
8	Isiah Moore	South Carolina	14.05	

==== 400 meters hurdles ====
- Only top eight final results shown; no prelims are listed

Rank	Name	University	Time	Notes
1st place, gold medalist(s)	Eric Futch	Florida	48.32	
2nd place, silver medalist(s)	Rai Benjamin	UCLA	48.33	
3rd place, bronze medalist(s)	(Jamaica) Kemar Mowatt	Arkansas	48.49	
4	Kenny Selmon	North Carolina	48.60	
5	Desmond Palmer	Pittsburgh	49.63	
6	TJ Holmes	Florida	49.98	
7	David Kendziera	Illinois	50.78	
8	Robert Grant	Texas A&M	1:20.79	

==== 3000 meters steeplechase ====
- Only final results shown; no prelims are listed

Rank	Name	University	Time	Notes
1st place, gold medalist(s)	Edwin Kibichiy	Louisville	8:28.40	
2nd place, silver medalist(s)	Darren Fahy	Georgetown University	8:31.08	
3rd place, bronze medalist(s)	Dylan Blankenbaker	Oklahoma	8:31.17	
4	MJ Erb	Ole Miss	8:32.38	
5	Scott Carpenter	Georgetown University	8:32.92	
6	Benard Keter	Texas Tech	8:34.27	
7	Troy Fraley	Gonzaga University	8:35.38	
8	Troy Reeder	Furman University	8:38.64	
9	Emmanuel Rotich	Tulane	8:40.64	
10	Jacob Heslington	BYU	8:44.28	
11	Bailey Roth	Arizona	8:48.70	
12	Noah Schutte	University of Portland	9:04.87	

==== 4 x 100 meters relay ====
- Only top eight final results shown; no prelims are listed

Rank	University	Time	Notes
1st place, gold medalist(s)	Houston	38.34	
2nd place, silver medalist(s)	Auburn	38.48	
3rd place, bronze medalist(s)	N. Carolina A&T	38.57	
4	Texas A&M	38.72	
5	Texas	38.73	
6	Oregon	38.81	
7	Arkansas	38.82	
8	LSU	DNF	

==== 4 x 400 meters relay ====
- Only top eight final results shown; no prelims are listed

Rank	University	Time	Notes
1st place, gold medalist(s)	Texas A&M	2:59.98	
2nd place, silver medalist(s)	Arkansas	3:01.84	
3rd place, bronze medalist(s)	Iowa	3:01.91	
4	Florida	3:02.16	
5	Texas Tech	3:02.29	
6	Alabama	3:03.81	
7	Ohio State	3:05.27	
8	Auburn	3:12.22	

==== Long Jump ====
- Only final results shown; no prelims are listed

Rank	Name	University	Distance	Wind	Notes
1st place, gold medalist(s)	KeAndre Bates	University of Florida	8.05m (26-5 )		
2nd place, silver medalist(s)	Grant Holloway	University of Florida	8.00m (26-3 )		
3rd place, bronze medalist(s)	Will Williams	Texas A&M	7.96m (26-1 1/2 )		
4	Terrell Mcclain	University of Akron	7.80m (25-7 1/4 )		
5	Chris Mcbride	Clemson University	7.71m (25-3 1/2 )		
6	Eric Sloan	University of Southern California	7.65m (25-1 1/4 )		
7	Carlos Becker	Florida State	7.63m (25-1/2 )		
8	Andreas Trajkovski	University of Arkansas	7.62m (25-0 )		
9	Jacob Fincham-dukes	Oklahoma State	7.61m (24-11 3/4 )		
10	O'Brien Wasome	University of Texas at Austin	7.58m (24-10 1/2 )		
11	Scotty Newton	Texas Christian University	7.51m (24-7 3/4 )		
12	Justin Hall	Texas Tech	7.48m (24-6 1/2 )		
13	Isaiah Griffith	University of Nebraska–Lincoln	7.47m (24-6 1/4 )		
14	Jamie Brown	Alabama State	7.46m (24-5 3/4 )		
15	Adrian Riley	University of Texas at San Antonio	7.44m (24-5 )		
16	Harrison Schrage	University of Arkansas	7.40m (24-3 1/2 )		
17	Cory Barger	Sacramento State University	7.34m (24-1 )		
18	Malik Moffett	Penn State	7.32m (24-1/4 )		
19	Willie Reed	Miss State	7.28m (23-10 3/4 )		
20	Ventavius Sears	Western Kentucky	7.26m (23-10 )		
21	O'Shea Wilson	University of Iowa	7.20m (23-7 1/2 )		
22	Zack Bazile	Ohio State	7.14m (23-5 1/4 )		
23	Samory Fraga	Kent State	6.99m (22-11 1/4 )		
	Fred Dorsey	University of Kentucky	FOUL		

==== Triple Jump ====
- Only final results shown; no prelims are listed

Rank	Name	University	Distance	Wind	Notes
1st place, gold medalist(s)	KeAndre Bates	University of Florida	16.76m (55-0 )		
2nd place, silver medalist(s)	Clive Pullen	University of Arkansas	16.60m (54-5 1/2 )		
3rd place, bronze medalist(s)	Scott Carter	University of Wyoming	16.24m (53-3 1/2 )		
4	Hayden Mcclain	University of Oklahoma	16.17m (53-3/4 )		
5	Barden Adams	University of Kansas	16.08m (52-9 1/4 )		
6	Montel Nevers	Florida State	16.05m (52-8 )		
7	Craig Stevens	Kent State	16.00m (52-6 )		
8	Samuel Trigg	New Mexico	15.97m (52-4 3/4 )		
9	Armani Wallace	Florida State	15.97m (52-4 3/4 )		
10	Scotty Newton	Texas Christian University	15.86m (52-1/2 )		
11	Clayton Brown	University of Florida	15.82m (51-11 )		
12	Michael Tiller	Bethune-Cookman	15.73m (51-7 1/4 )		
13	Jeffrey Prothro	Texas A&M	15.70m (51-6 1/4 )		
14	Felix Obi	Baylor University	15.66m (51-4 1/2 )		
15	Efe Uwaifo	Harvard	15.65m (51-4 1/4 )		
16	Eric Sloan	University of Southern California	15.62m (51-3 )		
17	Bryce Williams	Penn State	15.59m (51-1 3/4 )		
18	Jordan Scott	University of Virginia	15.50m (50-10 1/4 )		
19	Jaden Purnell	Oral Roberts University	15.50m (50-10 1/4 )		
20	Antwon James	University of Iowa	15.38m (50-5 1/2 )		
21	Isaiah Griffith	University of Nebraska–Lincoln	15.13m (49-7 3/4 )		
22	Eric Bethea	Indiana University Bloomington	15.03m (49-3 3/4 )		
23	Klyvens Delaunay	University of Alabama	14.58m (47-10 )		
	Lasheon Strozier	North Carolina A&T State University	FOUL		

==== High Jump ====
- Only top eight final results shown; no prelims are listed

Rank	Name	University	Height	Notes
1st place, gold medalist(s)	Christoff Bryan	Kansas State	2.21m (7-3 )	
2nd place, silver medalist(s)	Trey Culver	Texas Tech	2.21m (7-3 )	
3rd place, bronze medalist(s)	Justice Summerset	University of Arizona	2.18m (7-1 3/4 )	
4	Tye Williams	University of South Carolina	2.13m (6-11 3/4 )	
4	Keenon Laine	University of Georgia	2.13m (6-11 3/4 )	
6	Jalen Ford	Iowa State	2.13m (6-11 3/4 )	
7	Jerin Allen	University of Louisville	2.13m (6-11 3/4 )	
7	Jhonny Victor	University of Florida	2.13m (6-11 3/4 )	
9	Clayton Brown	University of Florida	2.13m (6-11 3/4 )	
9	Jonathan Wells	University of Illinois Urbana-Champaign	2.13m (6-11 3/4 )	
9	Eric Blackman	Purdue	2.13m (6-11 3/4 )	
12	Michael Burke	UCLA	2.13m (6-11 3/4 )	
13	Michael Mccann	University of Nebraska–Lincoln	2.08m (6-9 3/4 )	
13	Matthew Birzer	University of Notre Dame	2.08m (6-9 3/4 )	
15	Tiaan Steenkamp	Arkansas State	2.08m (6-9 3/4 )	
15	Landon Bartel	University of Nebraska–Lincoln	2.08m (6-9 3/4 )	
15	Garrett Cragin	Texas A&M	2.08m (6-9 3/4 )	
15	Kyle Landon	Southern Illinois	2.08m (6-9 3/4 )	
19	Vincent Calhoun	California State University, Long Beach	2.08m (6-9 3/4 )	
19	Chris Sullivan	FIU	2.08m (6-9 3/4 )	
	Ed'Ricus Williams	Florida State	NH	
	Cody Stine	University of Akron	NH	
	Keyth Fightmaster	Samford University	NH	
	Justin Kretchmer	University of Kentucky	NH	

==== Pole Vault ====
- Only final results shown; no prelims are listed

Rank	Name	University	Height	Notes
1st place, gold medalist(s)	Matthew Ludwig	University of Akron	5.60m (18-4 1/2 )	
2nd place, silver medalist(s)	Adrian Valles	University of Cincinnati	5.55m (18-2 1/2 )	
3rd place, bronze medalist(s)	Hussain Alhizam	University of Kansas	5.45m (17-10 1/2 )	
3rd place, bronze medalist(s)	Chris Nilsen	University of South Dakota	5.45m (17-10 1/2 )	
5	Cole Walsh	University of Oregon	5.45m (17-10 1/2 )	
5	Jacob Wooten	Texas A&M	5.45m (17-10 1/2 )	
7	Audie Wyatt	Texas A&M	5.45m (17-10 1/2 )	
8	Sean Collins	University of South Alabama	5.45m (17-10 1/2 )	
9	Nate Richartz	University of Notre Dame	5.45m (17-10 1/2 )	
10	Devin King	Southeastern Louisiana University	5.30m (17-4 1/2 )	
11	Barrett Poth	University of Texas at Austin	5.30m (17-4 1/2 )	
12	Will Herrscher	University of Alabama	5.30m (17-4 1/2 )	
12	Jake Albright	University of Kansas	5.30m (17-4 1/2 )	
14	Noah Gary	Michigan State	5.30m (17-4 1/2 )	
15	Sean Clarke	University of Pennsylvania	5.30m (17-4 1/2 )	
16	Garrett Starkey	Arizona State	5.15m (16-10 3/4 )	
16	Brad Johnson	Virginia Tech	5.15m (16-10 3/4 )	
18	Everette Favor	University of Oklahoma	5.15m (16-10 3/4 )	
18	Carl Johansson	Texas A&M	5.15m (16-10 3/4 )	
20	Connor Hall	Duke University	5.15m (16-10 3/4 )	
20	Rashid Coulibaly	University of Wisconsin–Madison	5.15m (16-10 3/4 )	
	Armand Woodley	University of South Carolina	NH	
	August Kiles	Princeton University	NH	
	Antonio Ruiz	Stephen F. Austin State University	NH	

==== Shot Put ====
- Only top eight final results shown; no prelims are listed

Rank	Name	University	Distance	Notes
1st place, gold medalist(s)	Filip Mihaljevic Croatia	Virginia	21.30m (69-10 3/4 )	
2nd place, silver medalist(s)	Mostafa Hassan Egypt	Colorado State	20.38m (66-10 1/2 )	
3rd place, bronze medalist(s)	Nicholas Demaline	Ohio State	20.08m (65-10 1/2 )	
4	Oghenakpobo Efekoro	Virginia	19.70m (64-7 3/4 )	
5	Denzel Comenentia Netherlands	Georgia	19.63m (64-5 )	
6	Nicholas Ponzio	USC	19.53m (64-1 )	
7	Peter Simon Hungary	California	19.49m (63-11 1/2 )	
8	Alex Renner	N Dakota State	19.26m (63-2 1/4 )	

==== Discus throw ====
- Only top eight final results shown; no prelims are listed

Rank	Name	University	Distance	Notes
1st place, gold medalist(s)	Filip Mihaljevic Croatia	Virginia	63.76 m (209 ft 2 in)	
2nd place, silver medalist(s)	Reginald Jagers	Kent State	62.51 m (205 ft 1 in)	
3rd place, bronze medalist(s)	Jordan Young Canada	Virginia	61.94 m (203 ft 2 in)	
4	Brian Williams	Ole Miss	59.95 m (196 ft 8 in)	
5	Reno Tuufuli	University of Iowa	59.81 m (196 ft 2 in)	
6	Mitchell Cooper	Kansas	59.12 m (193 ft 11 in)	
7	Marek Barta	Virginia Tech	58.99 m (193 ft 6 in)	
8	Kyle Long	Arizona State	58.09 m (190 ft 7 in)	

==== Javelin throw ====
- Only top eight final results shown; no prelims are listed

Rank	Name	University	Distance	Notes
1st place, gold medalist(s)	Ioannis Kyriazis	Texas A&M	82.58m (270-11 )	
2nd place, silver medalist(s)	Nicolas Quijera	Miss State	76.77m (251-10 )	
3rd place, bronze medalist(s)	Michael Shuey	Penn State	76.42m (250-9 )	
4	Alex Pascal	University of Missouri	75.38m (247-4 )	
5	Matti Mortimore	North Dakota State University	74.33m (243-10 )	
6	Sindri Gudmundsson	Utah State	73.28m (240-5 )	
7	Curtis Thompson	Miss State	72.47m (237-9 )	
8	Chris Mirabelli	Rutgers	71.68m (235-2 )	
9	Ryan Kerr	Penn State	70.71m (232-0 )	
10	McLean Lipschutz	University of Alabama	69.41m (227-8 )	
11	Sam Hardin	Texas A&M	69.34m (227-6 )	
12	Cody Danielson	University of Oregon	69.31m (227-4 )	
13	Michael Criticos	University of Memphis	69.18m (227-0 )	
14	Adrian Mitchell	University of Albany	68.54m (224-10 )	
15	Matthew Kuskey	UC Santa Barbara	68.25m (223-11 )	
16	Simon Litzell	UCLA	67.62m (221-10 )	
17	Werner Bouwer	Texas Tech	67.60m (221-9 )	
18	Michael Biddle	Penn State	66.95m (219-8 )	
19	Reinhard Van	University of Missouri	66.86m (219-4 )	
20	Emron Gibbs	Southern Miss.	66.76m (219-0 )	
21	Seth Derr	University of Nebraska–Lincoln	66.05m (216-8 )	
22	Ethan Shalaway	University of Kentucky	65.02m (213-4 )	
23	Marian Spannowsky	UCLA	64.90m (212-11 )	
24	Tucker Rizzi	College of William & Mary	60.91m (199-10 )	

==== Hammer throw ====
- Only final results shown; no prelims are listed

Rank	Name	University	Distance	Notes
1st place, gold medalist(s)	Rudy Winkler	Cornell	74.12m (243-2 )	
2nd place, silver medalist(s)	Alex Young	Southeastern Louisiana University	73.66m (241-8 )	
3rd place, bronze medalist(s)	Gleb Dudarev	Kansas	73.44m (240-11 )	
4	Hilmar Orn	Virginia	72.38m (237-5 )	
5	Denzel Comenentia	University of Georgia	71.75m (235-4 )	
6	Johnnie Jackson	LSU	71.72m (235-4 )	
7	Alex Poursanidis	University of Georgia	71.44m (234-4 )	
8	Joseph Ellis	Michigan	70.33m (230-9 )	
9	Jordan Young	Virginia	69.71m (228-8 )	
10	Dempsey Mcguigan	Ole Miss	69.14m (226-10 )	
11	Adam Keenan	Northern Arizona	68.98m (226-4 )	
12	Cameron Brown	Tennessee	68.55m (224-11 )	
13	Joshua Hernandez	Sam Houston State University	66.95m (219-8 )	
14	Brock Eager	Washington St.	66.16m (217-1 )	
15	Seth Whitener	Tennessee	66.14m (217-0 )	
16	Cristian Ravar	Arkansas State	65.33m (214-4 )	
17	Trevor Troutman	Louisville	65.09m (213-6 )	
18	Austin Riddle	Rice	64.94m (213-1 )	
19	Riley Budde	Wisconsin	63.15m (207-2 )	
20	Mitch Dixon	Kansas State	62.91m (206-4 )	
21	Brady Grunder	Kansas State	62.71m (205-9 )	
22	Kyle Smith	Kansas State	61.54m (201-11 )	
23	Austin Cook	Texas A&M	60.00m (196-10 )	
24	Cullen Prena	Oregon	59.75m (196-0 )	

==== Decathlon ====
- Only final results shown; no prelims are listed

Rank	Name	University	Points	Notes
1st place, gold medalist(s)	Lindon Victor	Texas A&M	8390	
2nd place, silver medalist(s)	Devon Williams	University of Georgia	8181	
3rd place, bronze medalist(s)	Luca Wieland	University of Minnesota	8146	
4	Steven Bastien	University of Michigan	8015	
5	Scott Filip	Rice University	7867	
6	Hunter Veith	Wichita State	7866	
7	Cody Walton	University of Nebraska–Lincoln	7813	
8	Wolf Mahler	University of Texas at Austin	7737	
9	TJ Lawson	Kent State	7725	
10	Steele Wasik	University of Texas at Austin	7642	
11	Daniel Golubovic	Duke University	7634	
12	Joe Delgado	University of Oregon	7590	
13	Gabe Moore	University of Arkansas	7527	
14	Tim Ehrhardt	Michigan State	7455	
15	Mitch Modin	University of Oregon	7446	
16	Josh Cogdill	Colorado St.	7258	
17	William Dougherty	University of Iowa	7199	
18	Derek Jacobus	University of Arkansas	7126	
19	Tim Duckworth	University of Kentucky	7026	
20	Jackson Walker	BYU	6821	
DNF	Hunter Price	Colorado St.	--	
DNF	Markus Leemet	University of South Carolina	--	
DNF	Karl Saluri	University of Georgia	--	
DNF	Jack Lint	University of Virginia	--	

=== Women's events ===
==== Women's 100 meters ====
- Only top eight final results shown; no prelims are listed

Wind: +0.3 m/s

Rank	Name	University	Time	Notes
1st place, gold medalist(s)	Mikiah Brisco	LSU	10.96	
2nd place, silver medalist(s)	Deajah Stevens	Oregon	11.04	
3rd place, bronze medalist(s)	Teahna Daniels	Texas	11.06	
4	Ariana Washington	Oregon	11.09	
5	Aleia Hobbs	LSU	11.12	
6	Ashley Henderson	San Diego State	11.19	
7	Aaliyah Brown	Texas A&M	11.21	
8	Ky Westbrook	USC	11.29	

==== Women's 200 meters ====
- Only top eight final results shown; no prelims are listed

Wind: +1.1 mps

Rank	Name	University	Time	Notes
1st place, gold medalist(s)	Kyra Jefferson	Florida	22.02	
2nd place, silver medalist(s)	Ariana Washington	Oregon	22.39	
3rd place, bronze medalist(s)	Gabrielle Thomas	Harvard	22.61	
4	Aaliyah Brown	Texas A&M	22.79	
5	Jada Martin	LSU	22.85	
6	Deanna Hill	USC	23.00	
7	Brittany Brown	Iowa	23.02	
-	Deajah Stevens	Oregon	DQ	

==== Women's 400 meters ====
- Only top eight final results shown; no prelims are listed

Rank	Name	University	Time	Notes
1st place, gold medalist(s)	Chrisann Gordon Jamaica	Texas	50.51	
2nd place, silver medalist(s)	Shakima Wimbley	Miami	50.68	
3rd place, bronze medalist(s)	Kendall Ellis	USC	51.06	
4	Daina Harper	Arkansas	51.57	
5	Shakira Barnett	Florida	51.84	
6	Elexis Guster	Oregon	52.25	
7	Cameron Pettigrew	USC	52.52	
8	Jaevin Reed	Texas A&M	52.61	

==== Women's 800 meters ====
- Only top eight final results shown; no prelims are listed

Rank	Name	University	Time	Notes
1st place, gold medalist(s)	Raevyn Rogers	Oregon	2:00.02	
2nd place, silver medalist(s)	Hanna Green	Virginia Tech	2:01.32	
3rd place, bronze medalist(s)	Brooke Feldmeier	Oregon	2:01.54	
4	Shea Collinsworth	BYU	2:02.30	
5	Katlee Dodd	Oklahoma State	2:03.38	
6	Rianna Goins	UC Davis	2:03.86	
7	Courtney Clayton	Vanderbilt	2:04.02	
8	Olivia Baker	Stanford	2:04.21	

==== Women's 1500 meters ====
- Only top eight final results shown; no prelims are listed

Rank	Name	University	Time	Notes
1st place, gold medalist(s)	Jaimie Phelan	Michigan	4:13.78	
2nd place, silver medalist(s)	Nikki Hiltz	Arkansas	4:13.80	
3rd place, bronze medalist(s)	Karisa Nelson	Samford	4:13.96	
4	Katie Rainsberger	Oregon	4:14.20	
5	Dani Jones	Colorado	4:14.35	
6	Rebecca Mehra	Stanford	4:14.52	
7	Christina Aragon	Stanford	4:14.79	
8	Amy-Eloise Neale United Kingdom	Washington	4:14.89	

==== Women's 5000 meters ====
- Only top eight final results shown; no prelims are listed

Rank	Name	University	Time	Notes
1st place, gold medalist(s)	Karissa Schweizer	Missouri	15:38.93	
2nd place, silver medalist(s)	Alsu Bogdanova Russia	Eastern Michigan	15:43.84	
3rd place, bronze medalist(s)	Katherine Receveur	Indiana	15:44.80	
4	Allie Ostrander	Boise State	15:46.18	
5	Fiona O'Keeffe	Stanford	15:46.93	
6	Allie Buchalski	Furman	15:48.07	
7	Sarah Disanza	Wisconsin	15:48.51	
8	Samantha Nadel	Oregon	15:48.93	

==== Women's 10000 meters ====
- Only top eight final results shown; no prelims are listed

Rank	Name	University	Time	Notes
1st place, gold medalist(s)	Charlotte Taylor	San Francisco	32:38.57	
2nd place, silver medalist(s)	Alice Wright United Kingdom	New Mexico	32:42.64	
3rd place, bronze medalist(s)	Sharon Lokedi Kenya	Kansas	32:46.10	
4	Alyssa Snyder	Montana State	32:58.31	
5	Erin Clark	Colorado	33:03.22	
6	Regan Rome	William and Mary	33:06.03	
7	Chelsea Blaase	Tennessee	33:06.86	
8	Caroline Sang Kenya	Charlotte	33:09.67	

==== Women's 100 meters hurdles ====
- Only top eight final results shown; no prelims are listed

Wind: +1.6 mps

Rank	Name	University	Time	Notes
1st place, gold medalist(s)	Tobi Amusan Nigeria	UTEP	12.57	
2nd place, silver medalist(s)	Jasmine Camacho-Quinn Puerto Rico	Kentucky	12.58	
3rd place, bronze medalist(s)	Rushelle Burton	Texas	12.65	
4	Alaysha Johnson	Oregon	12.72	
5	Devynne Charlton	Purdue	12.74	
6	Sasha Wallace	Oregon	12.81	
7	Dior Hall	USC	12.82	
8	Anna Cockrell	USC	12.91	

==== Women's 400 meters hurdles ====
- Only top eight final results shown; no prelims are listed

Rank	Name	University	Time	Notes
1st place, gold medalist(s)	Sage Watson Canada	Arizona	54.52	
2nd place, silver medalist(s)	Anna Cockrell	USC	55.36	
3rd place, bronze medalist(s)	Amalie Iuel Norway	USC	55.82	
4	Ariel Jones	Texas	56.52	
5	Kymber Payne	LSU	56.60	
6	Jade Miller	Harvard	56.61	
7	Symone Black	Purdue	57.15	
8	Katrina Seymour Bahamas	East Tennessee State	59.68	

==== Women's 3000 meters steeplechase ====
- Only top eight final results shown; no prelims are listed

Rank	Name	University	Time	Notes
1st place, gold medalist(s)	Allie Ostrander	Boise State	9:41.31	
2nd place, silver medalist(s)	Madison Boreman	Colorado	9:46.48	
3rd place, bronze medalist(s)	Tori Gerlach	Penn State	9:46.76	
4	Elinor Purrier	New Hampshire	9:48.26	
5	Grayson Murphy	Utah	9:53.66	
6	Hope Schmelzle	Northern Illinois	9:55.49	
7	Ellie Abrahamson	Wake Forest	9:56.18	
8	Brianna Ilarda Australia	Providence	10:02.83	

==== Women's 4 x 100 meters relay ====
- Only top eight final results shown; no prelims are listed

Rank	University	Time	Notes
1st place, gold medalist(s)	Kentucky	42.51	
2nd place, silver medalist(s)	Alabama	42.56	
3rd place, bronze medalist(s)	Florida	42.73	
4	San Diego State	43.32	
5	Clemson	43.38	
6	Arkansas	43.68	
7	Purdue	43.88	
8	Kansas State	45.00	

==== Women's 4 x 400 meters relay ====
- Only top eight final results shown; no prelims are listed

Rank	University	Time	Notes
1st place, gold medalist(s)	Oregon	3:23.13	
2nd place, silver medalist(s)	USC	3:23.35	
3rd place, bronze medalist(s)	LSU	3:26.99	
4	Texas A&M	3:27.26	
5	Texas	3:27.27	
6	Florida	3:27.76	
7	Miami	3:28.90	
8	Ohio State	3:31.36	

==== Women's Long Jump ====
- Only final results shown; no prelims are listed

Rank	Name	University	Distance	Wind	Notes
1st place, gold medalist(s)	Kate Hall	University of Georgia	6.73m (22-1 )	-0.6	
2nd place, silver medalist(s)	Keturah Orji	University of Georgia	6.71m (22-1/4 )	+2.2	
3rd place, bronze medalist(s)	Sydney Conley	University of Kansas	6.56m (21-6 1/4 )	+0.2	
4	Jhoanmy Luque	Iowa State	6.54m (21-5 1/2 )	+0.3	
5	Sha'Keela Saunders	University of Kentucky	6.48m (21-3 1/4 )	+0.1	
6	Rougui Sow	University of South Carolina	6.45m (21-2 )	+0.1	
7	Savannah Carson	Purdue	6.44m (21-1 1/2 )	+3.3	
8	Wurrie Njadoe	Kansas State	6.36m (20-10 1/2 )	+0.9	
9	Tierra Williams	University of Nebraska–Lincoln	6.33m (20-9 1/4 )	-0.9	
10	Darrielle Mcqueen	University of Florida	6.33m (20-9 1/4 )	-1.4	
11	Quanesha Burks	University of Alabama	6.27m (20-7 )	-2.2	
12	Destiny Carter	University of Kentucky	6.25m (20-6 1/4 )	-1.3	
13	Allanah Mccorkle	Iowa State	6.16m (20-2 1/2 )	+0.7	
14	Nataliyah Friar	LSU	6.12m (20-1 )	-0.3	
15	Rose Jackson	North Dakota State University	6.07m (19-11 )	-1.1	
16	Jahisha Thomas	University of Iowa	6.04m (19-9 3/4 )	-0.8	
17	Yanis David	University of Florida	6.01m (19-8 3/4 )	-1.1	
18	Leah Lott	Miss State	6.01m (19-8 3/4 )	+0.0	
19	Filippa Fotopoulou	University of Alabama	5.93m (19-5 1/2 )	+0.0	
20	Rhesa Foster	University of Oregon	5.91m (19-4 3/4 )	-0.2	
21	Viershanie Latham	Texas Tech	5.90m (19-4 1/4 )	+0.8	
22	Baileh Simms	University of Oklahoma	5.90m (19-4 1/4 )	-2.4	
23	Zuliat Alli	Texas Tech	5.73m (18-9 3/4 )	+0.0	
24	Tayler Fleming	UC Riverside	5.64m (18-6 )	-0.7	

==== Women's Triple Jump ====
- Only top eight final results shown; no prelims are listed

Rank	Name	University	Distance	Wind	Notes
1st place, gold medalist(s)	Keturah Orji	Georgia	14.29 m (46 ft 10 1/2 in)w	+3.3	
2nd place, silver medalist(s)	Marie-Josee Ebwea-Bile France	Kentucky	13.69 m (44 ft 10 3/4 in)w	+2.6	
3rd place, bronze medalist(s)	Yanis David France	Florida	13.64 m (44 ft 9 in)w	+3.0	
4	Jhoanmy Luque Venezuela	Iowa State	13.47 m (44 ft 2 1/4 in)	+1.2	
5	Viershanie Latham	Texas Tech	13.45 m (44 ft 1 1/2 in)w	+2.6	
6	Dannielle Gibson Bahamas	Penn State	13.36 m (43 ft 9 3/4 in)	+0.1	
7	Amber Hughes	Tennessee State	13.32 m (43 ft 8 1/4 in)	+1.4	
8	Tiffany Flynn	Mississippi State	13.31 m (43 ft 8 in)	+1.5	

==== Women's High Jump ====
- Only top eight final results shown; no prelims are listed

Rank	Name	University	Height	Notes
1st place, gold medalist(s)	Madeline Fagan	Georgia	1.91 m (6 ft 3 in)	
2nd place, silver medalist(s)	Tatiana Gusin	Georgia	1.91 m (6 ft 3 in)	
3rd place, bronze medalist(s)	Kaysee Pilgrim	UNLV	1.85 m (6 ft 3/4 in)	
4	Logan Boss	Mississippi State	1.85 m (6 ft 3/4 in)	
5	Nikki Manson	Akron	1.85 m (6 ft 3/4 in)	
6	Loretta Blaut	Cincinnati	1.82 m (5 ft 11 1/2 in)	
6	Courtney Avery	Lehigh	1.82 m (5 ft 11 1/2 in)	
6	Chelsie Decoud	Texas State	1.82 m (5 ft 11 1/2 in)	

==== Women's Pole Vault ====
- Only top eight final results shown; no prelims are listed

Rank	Name	University	Height	Notes
1st place, gold medalist(s)	Olivia Gruver	Kentucky	4.50 m (14 ft 9 in)	
2nd place, silver medalist(s)	Alexis Weeks	Arkansas	4.45 m (14 ft 7 in)	
3rd place, bronze medalist(s)	Annie Rhodes Johnigan	Baylor	4.40 m (14 ft 5 in)	
4	Sydney Clute	Indiana	4.40 m (14 ft 5 in)	
5	Kristina Owsinski	Washington	4.40 m (14 ft 5 in)	
6	Victoria Hoggard	Arkansas	4.40 m (14 ft 5 in)	
7	Alyssa Applebee	Tulane	4.30 m (14 ft 1 1/4 in)	
8	Helen Falda	UTA	4.15 m (13 ft 7 1/4 in)	
8	Desiree Freier	Arkansas	4.15 m (13 ft 7 1/4 in)	
8	Sarah Bell	Vanderbilt	4.15 m (13 ft 7 1/4 in)	
8	Kayla Smith	Georgia	4.15 m (13 ft 7 1/4 in)	
8	Lakan Taylor	Alabama	4.15 m (13 ft 7 1/4 in)	

==== Women's Shot Put ====
- Only top eight final results shown; no prelims are listed

Rank	Name	University	Distance	Notes
1st place, gold medalist(s)	Danniel Thomas Jamaica	Kent State	19.15 m (62 ft 9 3/4 in)	
2nd place, silver medalist(s)	Emmonnie Henderson	Louisville	17.92 m (58 ft 9 1/2 in)	
3rd place, bronze medalist(s)	Brittany Mann	USC	17.49 m (57 ft 4 1/2 in)	
4	Raven Saunders	Ole Miss	17.47 m (57 ft 3 3/4 in)	
5	Janeah Stewart	Ole Miss	17.42 m (57 ft 1 3/4 in)	
6	Maggie Ewen	Arizona State	17.40 m (57 ft 1 in)	
7	Lloydricia Cameron	Florida	17.28 m (56 ft 8 1/4 in)	
8	Jessica Woodard	Oklahoma	17.22 m (56 ft 5 3/4 in)	

==== Women's Discus throw ====
- Only top eight final results shown; no prelims are listed

Rank	Name	University	Distance	Notes
1st place, gold medalist(s)	Shadae Lawrence Jamaica	Kansas State	61.37 m (201 ft 4 in)	
2nd place, silver medalist(s)	Maggie Ewen	Arizona State	60.11 m (197 ft 2 in)	
3rd place, bronze medalist(s)	Valarie Allman	Stanford	59.19 m (194 ft 2 in)	
4	Danniel Thomas Jamaica	Kent State	56.61 m (185 ft 8 in)	
5	Gabi Jacobs	Missouri	56.27 m (184 ft 7 in)	
6	Katelyn Daniels	Michigan State	56.12 m (184 ft 1 in)	
7	Laulauga Tausaga	Iowa	55.71 m (182 ft 9 in)	
8	Gleneve Grange Jamaica	Florida State	54.84 m (179 ft 11 in)	

==== Women's Javelin Throw ====
- Only top eight final results shown; no prelims are listed

Rank	Name	University	Distance	Notes
1st place, gold medalist(s)	Irena Sediva Czech Republic	Virginia Tech	58.76 m (192 ft 9 in)	
2nd place, silver medalist(s)	Marija Vucenovic Serbia	Florida	58.58 m (192 ft 2 in)	
3rd place, bronze medalist(s)	Ashley Pryke	Memphis	56.93 m (186 ft 9 in)	
4	Mackenzie Little Australia	Stanford	55.32 m (181 ft 5 in)	
5	Rebekah Wales	LSU	54.92 m (180 ft 2 in)	
6	Katelyn Gochenour	Duke	54.26 m (178 ft 0 in)	
7	Audrey Malone	Texas A&M	53.44 m (175 ft 3 in)	
8	Haley Crouser	Texas	53.09 m (174 ft 2 in)	

==== Women's Hammer Throw ====
- Only top eight final results shown; no prelims are listed

Rank	Name	University	Distance	Notes
1st place, gold medalist(s)	Maggie Ewen	Arizona State	73.32 m (240 ft 6 in)	
2nd place, silver medalist(s)	Brooke Andersen	Northern Arizona	68.62 m (225 ft 1 in)	
3rd place, bronze medalist(s)	Beatrice Llano	Georgia	67.42 m (221 ft 2 in)	
4	Janee Kassanavoid	Kansas State	66.58 m (218 ft 5 in)	
5	Veronika Kanuchova	Florida State	65.97 m (216 ft 5 in)	
6	Julia Ratcliffe New Zealand	Princeton	65.25 m (214 ft 0 in)	
7	Freya Block	Southern Illinois	64.56 m (211 ft 9 in)	
8	Emma Thor	Virginia Tech	64.19 m (210 ft 7 in)	

==== Women's Heptathlon ====
- Only top eight final results shown; no prelims are listed

Rank	Name	University	Points	Notes
1st place, gold medalist(s)	Kendell Williams	Georgia	6265	
2nd place, silver medalist(s)	Nina Schultz	Kansas State	5959	
3rd place, bronze medalist(s)	Taliyah Brooks	Arkansas	5795	
4	Leigha Brown	Arkansas	5694	
5	Jacklyn Siefring	Akron	5663	
6	Alissa Brooks-Johnson	Washington State	5658	
7	Jordan Gray	Kennesaw State	5621	
8	Kaylee Hinton	Texas Tech	5580	

== Standings ==
=== Men ===
- Only top ten teams shown

Rank	University	Score	Notes
1st place, gold medalist(s)	Florida	61.5	
2nd place, silver medalist(s)	Texas A&M	59.5	
3rd place, bronze medalist(s)	Virginia	36	
4	Arkansas	33	
5	Auburn	24	
6	Georgia	22.5	
7 (tie)	LSU	20	
7 (tie)	Tennessee	20	
9	Oregon	19.5	
10	Alabama	19.0	

=== Women ===
- Only top ten teams shown

Rank	University	Score	Notes
1st place, gold medalist(s)	Oregon	64	
2nd place, silver medalist(s)	Georgia	62.2	
3rd place, bronze medalist(s)	USC	43	
4	Kentucky	40	
5	Florida	39	
6	Arkansas	38.2	
7 (tie)	LSU	32	
7 (tie)	Texas	32	
9	Kansas State	25	
10	Arizona State	21	

== See also ==
- NCAA Men's Division I Outdoor Track and Field Championships
- NCAA Women's Division I Outdoor Track and Field Championships
