= Kate Hall (athlete) =

American track and field athlete

Kate Hall-Harnden
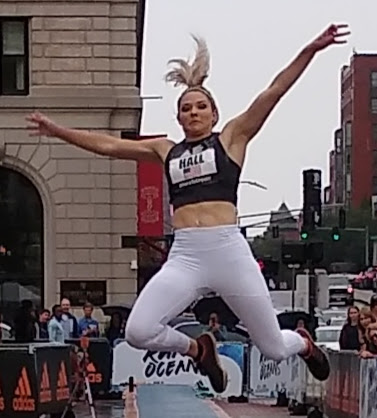
- Adidas Boost Boston Games (2019)

Personal information
- Born: Kate Hall; January 12, 1997 (age 29) Casco, Maine, U.S.
- Education: Lake Region High School (2015); University of Georgia
- Height: 5 ft 4 in (1.63 m)
- Weight: 121 lb (55 kg)

Sport
- Sport: Athletics
- Events: Long jump 60 meters
- College team: Georgia Bulldogs
- Coached by: Petros Kyprianou, 2017-2019; Chris Pribish, 2019-present

Kate Hall-Harnden (née Hall, born January 12, 1997) is an American track and field athlete specializing in the long jump and Sprint. Hall coached Track and Field at Saint Joseph's College of Maine between 2018 - 2022.

== Career ==
Hall is a Type 1 diabetic, having been diagnosed with the condition age 10.

Kate Hall erased the oldest girls' high school record in track and field when the 2015 high school senior from Maine leaped 22 feet, 5 inches outdoors at New Balance Outdoor Nationals in June 2015. Hall's record-breaking long jump has surpassed the minimum standard for the 2016 Rio Olympics set by the international track federation (IAAF). It also made her the No. 6-ranked American female long jumper in 2015, No. 16 in the world in 2016 and No. 6-ranked American female long jumper - No. 18 in the world in 2017.

Hall competed in the final of the long jump where she qualified for the final at 2016 United States Olympic Trials (track and field) jumped 6.59 m (21 ft 7 1/4 in) and in the final placed 10th with a best of 6.34 m (20 ft 9 1/2 in).

In January 2021, Hall-Harnden announced recovering from ACL injury.

US National Championship	Event	Venue	Place	Time
2022 USA Outdoor Track and Field Championships	Long Jump	Eugene, Oregon	5th	6.52 m (21 ft 4 1/2 in)
2020 USA Indoor Track and Field Championships	Long Jump	Albuquerque, New Mexico	2nd	6.69 m (21 ft 11 1/4 in)
2019 USA Outdoor Track and Field Championships	Long Jump	Des Moines, Iowa	10th	6.55 m (21 ft 5 3/4 in)
2019 USA Indoor Track and Field Championships	Long Jump	Ocean Breeze, New York	1st	6.51 m (21 ft 4 1/4 in)
2019 USA Indoor Track and Field Championships	60 meters	Ocean Breeze, New York	2nd	7.23
2016 United States Olympic Trials (track and field)	Long Jump	Eugene, Oregon	10th	6.34 m (20 ft 9 1/2 in)

== NCAA ==
Kate Hall placed 16th in Eugene, Oregon / University of Oregon at 2018 NCAA Division I Outdoor Track and Field Championships in Long Jump with a jump of 6.14 m (20 ft 1 1/2 in).

Kate Hall won long jump in College Station, Texas / Texas A&M University at 2018 NCAA Division I Indoor Track and Field Championships in Long Jump with a jump of 6.73 m (22 ft 3/4 in) ahead of Georgia Lady Bulldogs teammates (triple jump champion) Keturah Orji and Tara Davis whom placed 2nd and 3rd respectively. Hall also placed 6th in the 60 meters (7.24 s) after running a lifetime best 7.17 seconds (p).

Kate Hall won long jump in Eugene, Oregon / University of Oregon at 2017 NCAA Division I Outdoor Track and Field Championships in Long Jump with a jump of 6.71 m (22 ft 0 in) ahead of Georgia Lady Bulldogs teammate and triple jump champion Keturah Orji.

Hall, who broke the national girls high school record in the long jump less than a year ago, in her first event as a Cyclone at the Big 4 Duals on January 23, 2016, ran the second fastest 60-meter dash time in ISU history (7.40 seconds).

Representing University of Georgia
Year	Southeastern Conference Indoor track and field Championship	NCAA Division I Indoor track and field Championship	SEC Outdoor track and field Championship	NCAA Outdoor track and field Championship
2018	60 meters 7th 7.27	60 meters 6th 7.24	100 meters 11th 11.30	
2018	Long Jump 1st 6.64 m (21 ft 9 1/4 in)	Long Jump 1st 6.73 m (22 ft 3/4 in)	Long Jump 6th 6.45 m (21 ft 1 3/4 in)	Long Jump 16th 6.14 m (20 ft 1 1/2 in)
2017	60 meters 8th 7.35		100 meters 9th 11.34	
2017	Long Jump 4th 6.40 m (20 ft 11 3/4 in)	Long Jump 4th 6.48 m (21 ft 3 in)	Long Jump 4th 6.67 m (21 ft 10 1/2 in)	Long Jump 1st 6.71 m (22 ft 0 in)
Representing Iowa State University
Year	Big Ten Conference Indoor track and field Championship	NCAA Indoor Championships	Big Ten Outdoor Championships	NCAA Outdoor Championships
2016	Long Jump 2nd 6.44 m (21 ft 1 1/2 in)	Long Jump 12th 6.12 m (20 ft 3/4 in)		
2016	60 meters 4th 7.39			

== Prep ==
Hall is a 2015 graduate of Lake Region High School in Naples, Maine.

She had a high school personal best long jump of 22 feet 5 inches. Kate Hall's national record leap of 6.835 m (22 ft 5 in) in the girls long jump won her a title at the 2015 New Balance Nationals Outdoor on Sunday in Greensboro, North Carolina, and broke a 39-year-old national high school record. Hall placed third in 100 meters at the 2015 New Balance Nationals Outdoor.

Hall defended her New England Meet of Champions Long jump crown and set a Maine state record with a 6.38 m (20 ft 11 in) at the 70th New England Interscholastic Outdoor Track and Field Championship in May 2015.

She was named Maine Girls Track & Field Athlete of the Year by USA Today High School Sports in June 2015. The Gatorade State Girls Track & Field Athletes of the Year were selected based on athletic production and impact in the 2014–15 season.

The Gatorade Company, in collaboration with USA TODAY High School Sports, on June 19, 2014, announced selected her as its 2013–14 Gatorade Maine Girls Track & Field Athlete of the Year. She is the first Gatorade Maine Girls Track & Field Athlete of the Year to be chosen from Lake Region High School.

Hall won 2015 Maine State Track and Field Championship Class B State titles in long jump (20' 4.75), 200 meters (24.82), 100 meters (11.69), and placed 4th in 4×100 meters relay with Danica Chadwick, Hannah Chadwick, Sarah Hancock, Kate Hall.
