= Lake Region High School (Maine) =

Location
- 1877 Roosevelt Trail; Naples, Maine; United States
- Coordinates: 43°59′53″N 70°39′25″W

Information
- Type: Public high school
- Principal: Maggie Thornton
- Teaching staff: 43.00 (FTE)
- Grades: 9–12
- Enrollment: 503 (2024–2025)
- Student to teacher ratio: 11.70
- Colors: Blue and Gold
- Athletics: Paul True
- Mascot: King Triton
- Nickname: Lakers
- Website: lrhs.lakeregionschools.org

Lake Region High School is a public high school and associated on-site vocational center located in Naples, Maine, United States, serving the towns of Bridgton, Casco, and Naples. The school is part of Maine School Administrative District 61.
