= Keturah Orji =

American triple jumper (born 1996)

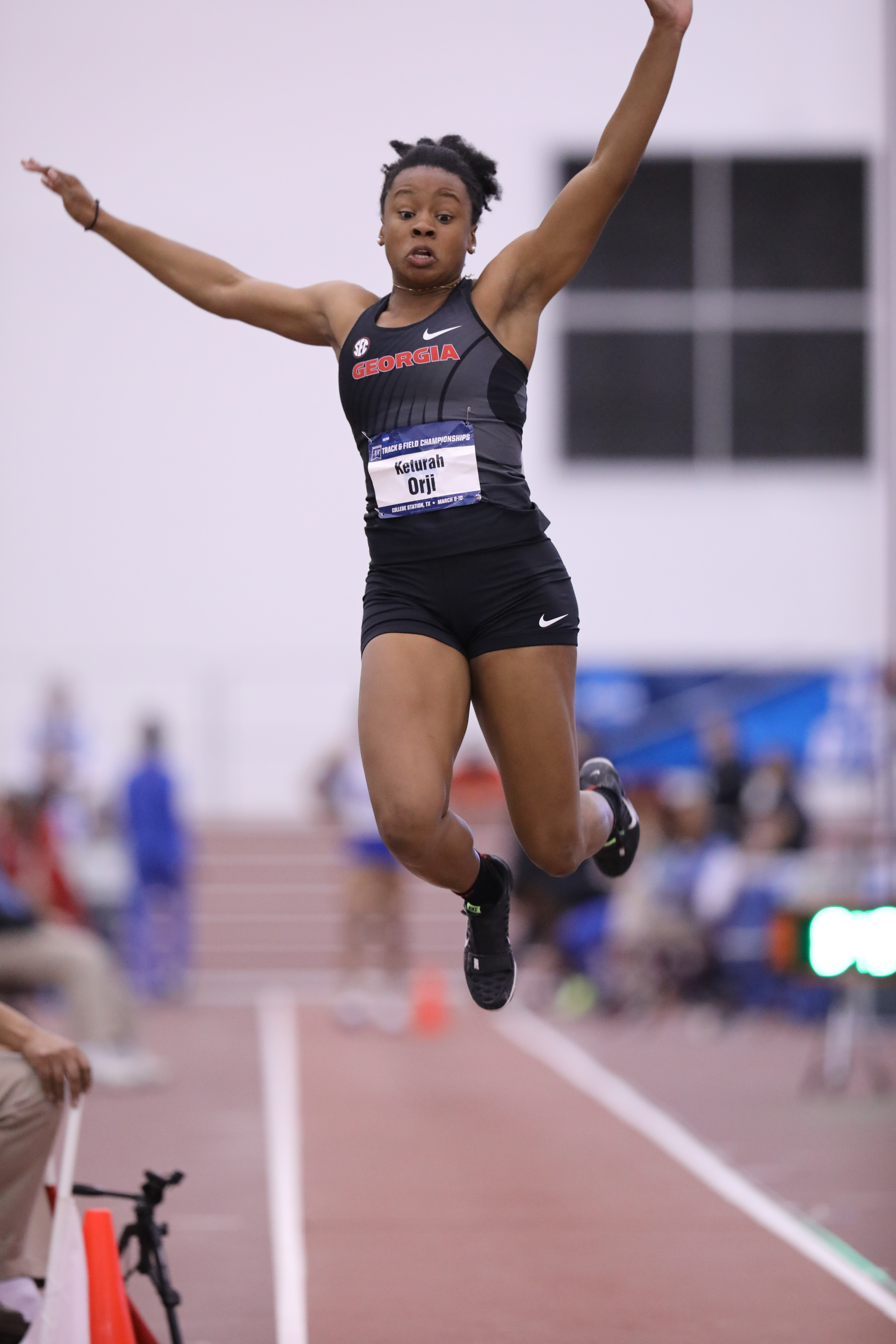
- American triple jumper

Personal information
- Born: March 5, 1996 (age 30) Hoboken, New Jersey, U.S.
- Home town: Mount Olive Township, New Jersey, U.S.
- Education: Mount Olive High School (2014); University of Georgia
- Height: 5 ft 5 in (1.66 m)

Sport
- Sport: Athletics
- Event: Triple jump
- College team: Georgia Bulldogs
- Turned pro: 2018
- Coached by: Petros Kyprianou
Medal record
Women's athletics
Representing the United States
Pan American Games
Silver medal – second place	2019 Lima	Long jump
IAAF World U18 Championships
Silver medal – second place	2013 Donetsk	Long jump
Bronze medal – third place	2013 Donetsk	Triple jump
NACAC Championships
Silver medal – second place	2022 Freeport	Triple jump

Keturah Orji (born March 5, 1996) is an American track and field athlete specializing in the triple jump. She has set a new US triple jump record twice.

== Early life ==
Born in Hoboken, New Jersey to Nigerian parents, Orji grew up in Mount Olive Township, New Jersey and graduated from Mount Olive High School in 2014.

In 2010, Orji was a level 8 gymnast at Giant Gymnastics, Inc. in Hackettstown, New Jersey. At the 2010 New Jersey state championships, she performed the All-Around (Vault, Bars, Beam and Floor). Orji wanted to become an Olympic gymnast as a youth. Orji credits doing gymnastics when she was young for part of her early success. She won the 2013-2014 New Jersey State Interscholastic Athletic Association girls track and field Gatorade Player of the Year awards. Orji defended her New Jersey Meet of Champions Triple jump crown, set a New Jersey state record with a 42-6 1/2 and improved on the Morris County long jump record of 20–2 in 2013. She had a high school personal best triple jump of 44 feet 11 inches She is a 2014 graduate of Mount Olive High School (New Jersey) in Flanders.

== NCAA ==
Orji placed second 2015 NCAA Division I Indoor Track and Field Championships triple jump and placed 13th in long jump. She won 2015 NCAA Division I Outdoor Track and Field Championships triple jump setting an American junior record and placed 7th in long jump and was named the 2016 Southeastern Conference Scholar-Athlete of the Year as well as the SEC Field Athlete of the Year. In 2016, Orji placed won 2016 NCAA Division I Indoor Track and Field Championships triple jump and placed 4th in long jump and was named the U.S. Track & Field and Cross Country Coaches Association (USTFCCCA) National Women's Outdoor Field Athlete of the Year in 2015–2016.

Orji won 2016 NCAA Division I Outdoor Track and Field Championships triple jump and placed 6th in long jump. She won fan vote for 2015-2016 Bowerman Award, The Bowerman award is collegiate track & field's highest individual honor.

In 2017, she won her fifth SEC Title as a champion in the triple jump 14.32 m (46 ft 11 3/4 in) at Vanderbilt University at the 2017 SEC Indoor track and field championships where she set SEC, college, NCAA Division I, and American records surpassing 1996 US Olympian and 10 time USATF national champion Sheila Hudson. Orji also won the 2017 NCAA Division I Indoor Track and Field Championships triple jump title and placed 3rd in long jump. Orji won her sixth SEC Title as a champion in the triple jump 13.95 m (45 ft 9 in) at University of South Carolina at the 2017 SEC Outdoor track and field championships and placed 5th in long jump 6.44 m (21 ft 1 1/2 in) behind champion Quanesha Burks 6.82 m (22 ft 4 1/2 in).

She won 2017 NCAA Division I Outdoor Track and Field Championships triple jump title and placed 2nd in long jump behind Georgia Lady Bulldogs teammate and champion Kate Hall. Orji was a 2017 Bowerman Award finalist.

Orji won her seventh SEC Title as a champion in the triple jump 14.18 m (46 ft 6 1/4 in) at Texas A&M University at the 2018 SEC Indoor track and field championships and placed 2nd in long jump 6.53 m (21 ft 5 in) behind champion Kate Hall 6.64 m (21 ft 9 1/4 in).

Orji won 2018 NCAA Division I Indoor Track and Field Championships triple jump title 14.27 m (46 ft 9 3/4 in) and placed 2nd in long jump 6.52 m (21 ft 4 1/2 in) behind champion Kate Hall 6.73 m (22 ft 3/4 in) ahead of Georgia Lady Bulldogs teammate Tara Davis. She won her ninth SEC Title triple jump and long jump championship titles jumping 14.62 m (47 ft 11 1/2 in) and 6.81 m (22 ft 4 in) respectively earning 20 points for the Georgia Lady Bulldogs in Knoxville, Tennessee where the Tennessee Volunteers hosted the 2018 SEC Outdoor track and field championships. Orji set a collegiate record in the triple jump in Knoxville.

She also won the 2018 NCAA Division I Outdoor Track and Field Championships triple jump and long jump championship titles jumping 14.04 m (46 ft 3/4 in) and 6.67 m (21 ft 10 1/2 in) respectively earning 20 points for the Georgia Lady Bulldogs in Eugene, Oregon / University of Oregon where the Oregon Ducks hosted the 2018 NCAA Division I Outdoor Track and Field Championships.

In 2018, Orji become first woman to win eight NCAA titles in Field events. Orji was named winner of The Bowerman for the 2018 track & field seasons. She was the first three-time female finalist in award history.

Representing University of Georgia
Year	SEC Indoor	NCAA Indoor	SEC Outdoor	NCAA Outdoor
2018	Triple Jump 1st 14.18 m (46 ft 6 1/4 in)	Triple Jump 1st 14.27 m (46 ft 9 3/4 in)	Triple Jump 1st 14.62 m (47 ft 11 1/2 in)	Triple Jump 1st 14.04 m (46 ft 3/4 in)
2018	Long Jump 2nd 6.53 m (21 ft 5 in)	Long Jump 2nd 6.52 m (21 ft 4 1/2 in)	Long Jump 1st 6.81 m (22 ft 4 in)	Long Jump 1st 6.67 m (21 ft 10 1/2 in)
2017	Triple Jump 1st 14.32 m (46 ft 11 3/4 in)	Triple Jump 1st 14.11 m (46 ft 3 1/2 in)	Triple Jump 1st 13.95 m (45 ft 9 in)	Triple Jump 1st 14.29 m (46 ft 10 1/2 in)
2017	Long Jump 3rd 6.72 m (22 ft 1/2 in)	Long Jump 3rd 6.58 m (21 ft 7 in)	Long Jump 5th 6.44 m (21 ft 1 1/2 in)	Long Jump 2nd 6.71 m (22 ft 0 in)
2016	Triple Jump 1st 14.08 m (46 ft 2 1/4 in)	Triple Jump 1st 14.12 m (46 ft 3 3/4 in)	Triple Jump 1st 14.60 m (47 ft 10 3/4 in)	Triple Jump 1st 14.53 m (47 ft 8 in)
2016	Long Jump 4th 6.51 m (21 ft 4 1/4 in)	Long Jump 4th 6.48 m (21 ft 3 in)	Long Jump 4th 6.48 m (21 ft 3 in)	Long Jump 6th 6.29 m (20 ft 7 1/2 in)
2015	Triple Jump 1st 13.72 m (45 ft 0 in)	Triple Jump 2nd 13.77 m (45 ft 2 in)	Triple Jump 1st 14.13 m (46 ft 4 1/4 in)	Triple Jump 1st 14.15 m (46 ft 5 in)
2015	Long Jump 3rd 6.43 m (21 ft 1 in)	Long Jump 13th 6.00 m (19 ft 8 in)	Long Jump 3rd 6.61 m (21 ft 8 in)	Long Jump 7th 6.57 m (21 ft 6 1/2 in)

== Professional career ==
Orji set the triple jump American Junior record at 14.15 m (46 ft 5 in) while winning the 2015 NCAA Outdoor Championships. She represented her country at the 2016 World Indoor Championships finishing fourth. She set the American record at 14.53 m (47 ft 8 in) while winning the 2016 NCAA Outdoor Championships.

Orji joined Team USA teammate Andrea Geubelle as one of the two meeting 2016 Olympic Standard at 2016 United States Olympic Trials (track and field) and represented the United States at Athletics at the 2016 Summer Olympics and in the fifth round the pair were joined by Christina Epps who jumped the 2016 Olympic Standard to form a trio for Rio. Orji jumped 14.71 m (48 ft 3 in) (+0.0 m/s, Rio de Janeiro 2016) Video of record setting jump American Record since broken by Tori Franklin. At the 2016 Olympics, she triple jumped 14.71 m (48 ft 3 in) American record at Athletics at the 2016 Summer Olympics – Women's triple jump to place fourth.

Orji was recognized as one of three finalists for The Bowerman Award presented by USTFCCCA, the highest collegiate honor in track and field, December 16, 2016, on Friday night in Orlando after being honored by the Southeastern Conference outdoor Scholar-Athlete of the Year. Mount Olive Superintendent Larrie Reynolds presented Orji with a plaque on Monday night, at a meeting which also acknowledged all fall athletes in the district. She was also presented with a "key to the city" at a township council workshop meeting on Tuesday night.

Injury forced Orji from competing in the 2017 World Championships in Athletics – Women's triple jump in London Stadium after qualifying at 2017 USA Outdoor Track and Field Championships where Orji triple jumped 14.26 m (46 ft 9 1/4 in) to win in 95 degree heat at Hornet Stadium (Sacramento). Orji was recognized as one of three finalists for The Bowerman Award presented by USTFCCCA in 2017.

Orji opened her final year by topping her own collegiate, NCAA Division I and American Indoor Records in the triple jump in 14.53 m (47 ft 8 in) at the Clemson Invitational on Saturday January 20, 2018. She placed 5th in the triple jump in Birmingham at 2018 IAAF World Indoor Championships after she jumped 14.31 m (46 ft 11 1/4 in).

Orji placed 2nd in the triple jump in London at 2018 Athletics World Cup after she jumped 14.60 m (47 ft 10 3/4 in).

Orji won 2018 USA Outdoor Track and Field Championships where Orji triple jumped 14.59 m (47 ft 10 1/4 in) setting a US Championship triple jump record.

== International competitions ==
Year	Competition	Venue	Position	Event	Notes
Representing the United States
2013	World Youth Championships	Donetsk, Ukraine	2nd	Long jump	6.39 m (20 ft 11 1/2 in)
2013	World Youth Championships	Donetsk, Ukraine	3rd	Triple jump	13.69 m (44 ft 10 3/4 in)
2014	World Junior Championships	Eugene, United States	9th	Triple jump	13.29 m (43 ft 7 in)
2016	World Indoor Championships	Portland, United States	4th	Triple jump	14.14 m (46 ft 4 1/2 in)
2016	Olympic Games	Rio de Janeiro, Brazil	4th	Triple jump	14.71 m (48 ft 3 in)
2018	World Indoor Championships	Birmingham, United Kingdom	5th	Triple jump	14.31 m (46 ft 11 1/4 in)
2019	World Championships	Doha, Qatar	7th	Triple jump	14.46 m (47 ft 5 1/4 in)
2019	Pan American Games	Lima, Peru	2nd	Long jump	6.66 m (21 ft 10 in)
2021	Olympic Games	Tokyo, Japan	7th	Triple jump	14.59 m (47 ft 10 1/4 in)
2022	World Indoor Championships	Belgrade, Serbia	7th	Triple jump	14.42 m (47 ft 3 1/2 in)
2022	World Championships	Eugene, United States	6th	Triple jump	14.49 m (47 ft 6 1/4 in)
2022	NACAC Championships	Freeport, Bahamas	2nd	Triple jump	14.32 m (46 ft 11 3/4 in)
2023	World Championships	Budapest, Hungary	9th	Triple jump	14.33 m (47 ft 0 in)
2024	World Indoor Championships	Glasgow, United Kingdom	4th	Triple jump	14.36 m (47 ft 1 1/4 in)
2024	Olympic Games	Paris, France	9th	Triple jump	14.05 m (46 ft 1 in)

== Personal bests ==
Outdoor

- Long jump – 6.81 m (22 ft 4 in) (+1.0 m/s, Knoxville, Tennessee 2018)
- Triple jump – 14.92 m (48 ft 11 1/4 in) (+1 m/s, Chula Vista High Performance 2021) American Outdoor Record

Indoor

- Long jump – 6.72 m (22 ft 1/2 in) (Nashville, Tennessee 2017)
- Triple jump – 14.53 m (47 ft 8 in) (Clemson, South Carolina 2018) former American Indoor Record

Awards
Preceded by Raevyn Rogers	The Bowerman (women's winner); 2018	Succeeded by incumbent
