= Janeah Stewart =

American track and field athlete (b. 1996)

Personal information
- Nationality: American
- Born: July 21, 1996 (age 29) Calumet City, Illinois
- Height: 1.85 m (6 ft 1 in)

Sport
- Country: United States
- Sport: Throws
- Event(s): Shot put, Weight, Discus, Hammer
- College team: University of Mississippi; Thornwood High School '14
- Turned pro: 2018
- Coached by: John Smith
Medal record
Women's athletics
Representing the United States

Janeah Stewart (born July 21, 1996) is a student-athlete on the University of Mississippi women's track and field team. The four event thrower from Illinois, was awarded All-American status her first three years of college. Janeah Stewart's winning weight throw of 23.18m/76-0.75 broke the SEC meet record that had stood since 2004 and moved her up to No. 1 in the nation this year and No. 6 in NCAA history.

== Professional ==
2017 World Rankings
Women's Shot Put 41
Women's Discus Throw 77
Women's Hammer Throw 99

2018 World Rankings
Women's Shot Put 36
Women's Discus Throw 109
Women's Hammer Throw 13

Stewart placed 13th by throwing the Hammer 63.78 m (209 ft 3 in) and fouled in the shot put at 2017 USA Outdoor Track and Field Championships.
Stewart placed 4th by throwing the Hammer 70.56 m (231 ft 5 3/4 in) and placed 5th by throwing 18.03 m (59 ft 1 3/4 in) in the shot put at 2018 USA Outdoor Track and Field Championships.

| Year | Competition | Venue | Position | Event | Notes |
USATF Championships
| 2018 | 2018 USA Outdoor Track and Field Championships | Drake University | 4th place | Hammer | 70.56 m (231 ft 6 in) |
| 2018 | 2018 USA Outdoor Track and Field Championships | Drake University | 5th place | Shot put | 18.03 m (59 ft 2 in) |
| 2017 | 2017 USA Outdoor Track and Field Championships | Sacramento State University | 13th place | Hammer | 63.78 m (209 ft 3 in) |
| 2017 | 2017 USA Outdoor Track and Field Championships | Sacramento State University | Did not place | Shot put | fouled |

== College ==
Stewart earned two NCAA Division I All-America honors after her 2018 NCAA Division I Outdoor Track and Field Championships where she threw Shot put 17.34 m (56 ft 10 1/2 in) to place fifth, and Hammer throw 72.92 m (239 ft 2 3/4 in) to place first. Her hammer performance is a top 10 college throw all time.

Stewart earned two NCAA Division I All-America honors after her 2018 NCAA Division I Indoor Track and Field Championships where she threw Shot put 15.40 m (50 ft 6 1/4 in) to place fifteenth, and Weight throw 23.26 m (76 ft 3 1/2 in) to place third.

Stewart earned two All-America honors after her 2016 National Junior College Athletic Association indoor championship where she threw Shot put 14.93 m (48 ft 11 3/4 in) to place second, and Weight throw 19.77 m (64 ft 10 1/4 in) to place second. Stewart is a 2016 Kansas Relays champion in the hammer after throwing 55.09 m (180 ft 8 3/4 in). Stewart is a 2016 Drake Relays champion in the shot put after throwing 16.31 m (53 ft 6 in). Stewart earned to All-America honors after her 2016 National Junior College Athletic Association outdoor championship where she threw shot put 15.78 m (51 ft 9 1/4 in) to place second, discus 50.79 m (166 ft 7 1/2 in) to place first, and hammer 58.95 m (193 ft 4 3/4 in) to place first.

Stewart is 2016 NJCAA National Women’s Outdoor Field Athlete of the Year, a four-time NJCAA national champion (2015 indoor shot put, 2015 outdoor shot put, 2016 outdoor discus, 2016 outdoor hammer) and 2016 runner-up in the outdoor shot put, nine-time NJCAA All-American, earning honors in the indoor and outdoor shot put, indoor weight throw, outdoor hammer throw and discus, and 2016 USTFCCCA Women’s Midwest Indoor Field Athlete of the Year.

Stewart set Iowa Central Community College school record holder in the shot put 16.31 m (53 ft 6 in), discus 50.79 m (166 ft 7 1/2 in), hammer throw 58.95 m (193 ft 4 3/4 in) and weight throw 19.77 m (64 ft 10 1/4 in).

Representing University of Mississippi
| Year | SEC Indoor | NCAA Indoor | SEC Outdoor | NCAA Outdoor |
|---|---|---|---|---|
| 2018 | Shot Put 2nd 17.63 m (57 ft 10 in) | Shot Put 15th 15.40 m (50 ft 6 1/4 in) | Shot Put 1st 17.97 m (58 ft 11 1/4 in) | Shot put 5th 17.34 m (56 ft 10 1/2 in) |
| 2018 | Weight 1st 23.06 m (75 ft 7 3/4 in) | Weight 3rd 23.26 m (76 ft 3 1/2 in) | Hammer 2nd 66.15 m (217 ft 1/4 in) | Hammer 1st 72.92 m (239 ft 2 3/4 in) |
| 2018 | | | Discus 3rd 54.91 m (180 ft 1 3/4 in) | |
| 2017 | Shot Put 2nd 17.31 m (56 ft 9 1/4 in) | Shot Put 8th 17.23 m (56 ft 6 1/4 in) | Shot Put 4th 17.42 m (57 ft 1 3/4 in) | Shot Put 5th 17.42 m (57 ft 1 3/4 in) |
| 2017 | Weight 1st 23.18 m (76 ft 1/2 in) | Weight 13th 20.05 m (65 ft 9 1/4 in) | Hammer 3rd 62.78 m (205 ft 11 1/2 in) | Hammer 10th 63.30 m (207 ft 8 in) |
| 2017 | | | Discus 2nd 54.57 m (179 ft 1/4 in) | Discus 9th 54.81 m (179 ft 9 3/4 in) |
Representing Iowa Central Community College
| Year | Region XI Indoor Championships | NJCAA Indoor Championships | Region XI Outdoor Championships | NJCAA Outdoor Championships |
| 2016 | Shot Put 1st 15.46 m (50 ft 8 1/2 in) | Shot Put 2nd 14.93 m (48 ft 11 3/4 in) | Shot Put 1st 15.80 m (51 ft 10 in) | Shot Put 2nd 15.78 m (51 ft 9 1/4 in) |
| 2016 | Weight 1st 18.43 m (60 ft 5 1/2 in) | Weight 2nd 19.77 m (64 ft 10 1/4 in) | Hammer 1st 58.51 m (191 ft 11 1/2 in) | Hammer 1st 58.95 m (193 ft 4 3/4 in) |
| 2016 | | | Discus 1st 47.36 m (155 ft 4 1/2 in) | Discus 1st 50.79 m (166 ft 7 1/2 in) |
| 2015 | Shot Put 1st 13.20 m (43 ft 3 1/2 in) | Shot Put 1st 14.71 m (48 ft 3 in) | Shot Put 1st 14.18 m (46 ft 6 1/4 in) | Shot Put 1st 16.23 m (53 ft 2 3/4 in) |
| 2015 | Weight 1st 15.12 m (49 ft 7 1/4 in) | Weight 11th 15.65 m (51 ft 4 in) | Hammer 1st 46.63 m (152 ft 11 3/4 in) | Hammer 7th 49.54 m (162 ft 6 1/4 in) |
| 2015 | | | Discus 2nd 41.07 m (134 ft 8 3/4 in) | Discus 4th 42.45 m (139 ft 3 1/4 in) |

== Prep ==
Stewart is a 2014 graduate of South Holland's Thornwood High School.
