= Craig Engels =

American middle-distance runner (born 1994)

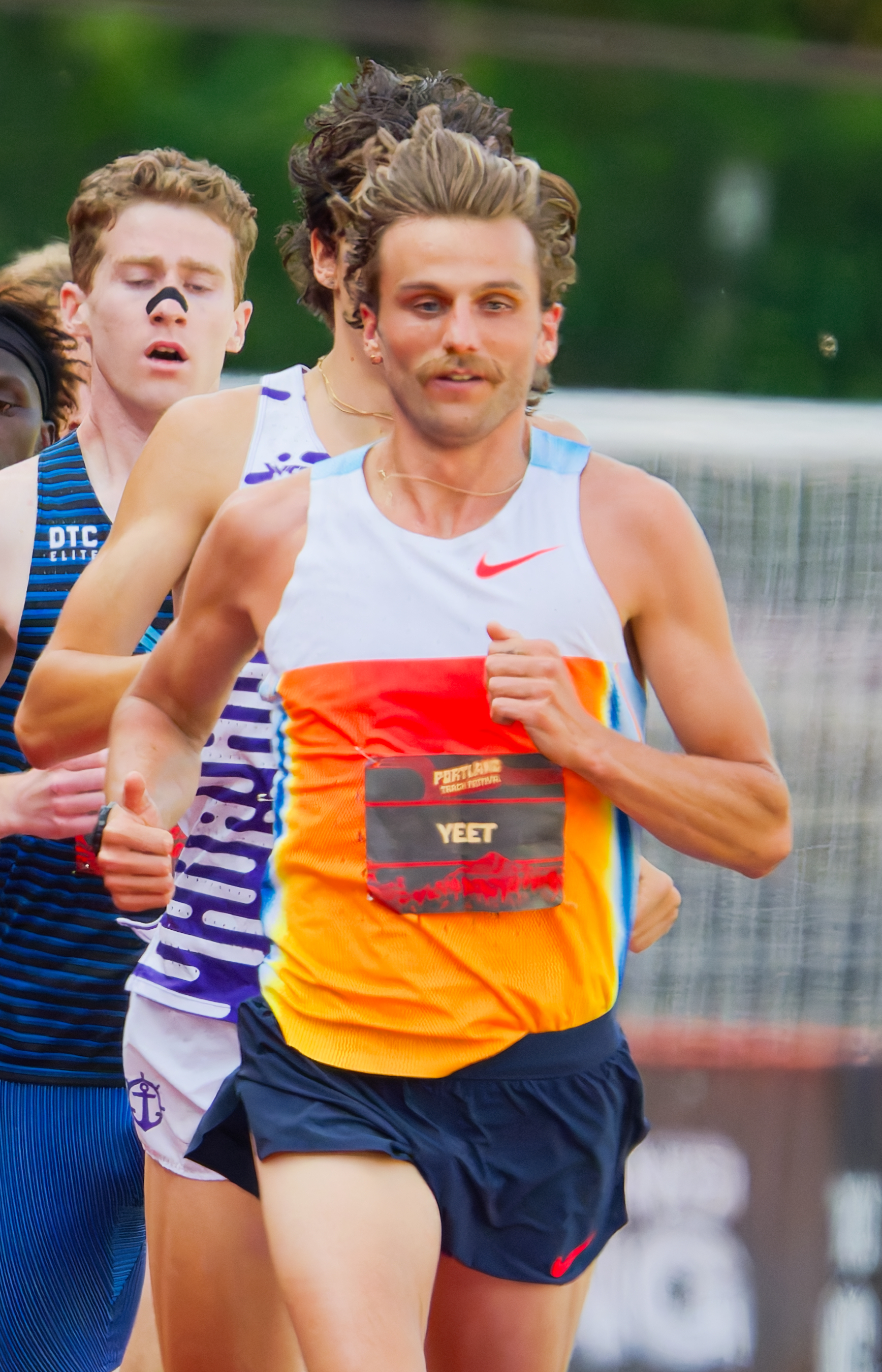
- Engels in 2025

Personal information
- Born: May 1, 1994 (age 32) Pfafftown, North Carolina, U.S.
- Height: 6 ft 0 in (183 cm)
- Weight: 145 lb (66 kg)

Sport
- Sport: Track, cross country
- Event(s): 1500 meters, mile
- College team: North Carolina State, Mississippi
- Club: Union Athletics
- Coached by: Ryan Vanhoy

Achievements and titles
- World finals: 2019 Doha; 1500 m, 10th
- Personal best(s): 800 meters: 1:44.68; 1500 meters: 3:33.64; Mile: 3:51.60
Medal record
Men's athletics
Representing United States
Pan American Junior Athletics Championships
Gold medal – first place	2013 Medellin	Men's 1500m
- Updated on April 12, 2016

Craig Engels (born May 1, 1994) is an American middle-distance runner. He is the 2019 US national champion in the 1500m. He also won the 2019 USATF Indoor Championships mile. He won an NCAA Championship as part of the Ole Miss men's distance medley relay team in 2017 and competed for the United States at the 2013 Pan American Junior Athletics Championships, where he won the men's 1500 meters.

== Running career ==
=== High school ===
Engels attended Ronald W. Reagan High School in Pfafftown, North Carolina, graduating in 2012. In addition to running cross country and track, he played for his school's soccer team and was a member of the Earth Club at his school. By the time he graduated from Reagan High School, he had set his school's records in the 800 meters, mile, and 3200 meters. In indoor track, he was a two-time NCHSAA 4A state champion in the 1000 meters, and one-time state champion in the mile. In outdoor track, he was a NCHSAA 4A state champion in the mile and 800 meters.

His best high school mile time was recorded at the 2012 Adidas Grand Prix Dream Mile, where he ran 4:03.96, which as of 2017 is the state high school record mile time for North Carolina. Throughout high school, Engels was coached by RunCCG coach, Chris Catton.

=== Collegiate ===
Engels first attended North Carolina State with an athletic scholarship. During his freshman year, he was redshirted and experienced chronic injury problems. In the summer after his freshman year, he traveled with the US junior national team to Colombia to compete at the 2013 Pan American Junior Athletics Championships, where he won the 1500 meters. Just four months after this, during winter break, Engels decided to terminate his enrollment at NC State. He considered stopping competitive running altogether, but was urged by his high school coach, Chris Catton, not to quit. During his winter of uncertainty, he sent gifts individually to his teammates at NC State as a sign of goodbye, and also bought a used recreational vehicle on Craigslist, which broke down immediately after purchase.

By early 2014, with some persuasion from Mississippi coach Ryan Vanhoy, who had tried to recruit Engels out of high school two years earlier, Engels transferred to University of Mississippi.

During the 2015 indoor season Engels debuted for Ole Miss at the Auburn Invitational, placing third in the mile in 4:05.51. Engels also set a new personal best of 4:01.19 at the Husky Classic for 12th place. Engels ran the 1600m leg of the Rebel's SEC championship Distance Medley Relay while also finishing runner-up in the mile event at the SEC Championships in 4:03.76.

During the 2015 outdoor season Engels made his outdoor Rebel debut at the Border Clash in the 800m, finishing second with a time of 1:48.27. He also made his 1500m Rebel debut at the Virginia Challenge, breaking the school record with a time of 3:40.28. Engels raced to a personal-best 800m time of 1:46.13 at the LSU Invitational, which left him ranked No. 2 all time in school history. Engels finished 10th at the SEC Championships in the 5000m in a Personal-best time of 14:20.27 which was followed up with a third-place finish in the 1500m with a time of 3:45.37. After finishing third in the NCAA East Prelims with a time of 1:47.16, Engels went on to finish 10th at the NCAA Championships with a time of 1:47.33, the eighth-fastest time of the semifinals and .04 seconds from advancing which earned him Second team All-America honors.

During the 2015 NCAA Cross Country season, Engels placed second on the team and 16th overall at the SEC Championships with an 8K time of 24:00.00, followed by a 15th-place finish in the 9.725 Kilometer Race at the NCAA South Region Championships with a time of 31:09.2, earning All-Region honors. In the last race of the season Engels Finished 160th overall at the NCAA Championships with a 10K time of 31:31.7

During the 2016 indoor season Engels ran the 800m leg of the fourth-place DMR team at the Penn State National that set a school record with a time of 9:30.48, followed by a fifth-place finish in the 800m at the Penn State National with an indoor personal-best time of 1:47.75. He finished seventh in the 800m at the SEC Championships with a time of 1:49.86, earning All-SEC First Team honors. Engels ran the 800m leg of the SEC Champion DMR team that won the third-straight DMR crown for Ole Miss at the SEC Championships. He then ran the 800m leg for the Ole Miss DMR team that placed third at the 2016 NCAA Indoor Track and Field Championships, earning First Team All-America honors.

Engels began the 2016 outdoor season strongly, finished first overall in the 800m at the Texas Invitational with a time of 1:47.17 and a second-place finish in the 800m at the Payton Jordan Invitational with a time of 1:47.06. He then set a school record with a second-place finish in the 1500m at the Florida Relays with a time of 3:38.82, which was the third fastest time in the NCAA in 2016. With a first-place finish in a time of 3:50.71 Engels became the first Ole' Miss man to win a SEC crown in the 1500m Run. Engels would finish 11th in the 1500m at the NCAA East Prelims (3:44.19) to qualify for the NCAA Championships, where he placed an impressive 7th in a time of 3:43.23, earning First Team All-America honors.

During the 2016 Olympic Trials Engels finished 4th and 5th in the 800m and 1500m finals while setting a personal best time of 1:46.03 in the 800m and 3:37.66 in the 1500m, which set a new Ole Miss Rebels school record.

=== Professional ===
In July 2017, Engels joined the Nike Oregon Project to be coached by Pete Julian and left Oxford, Mississippi for Portland, Oregon. Engels planned to be coached by Pete Julian, instead of Alberto Salazar, the latter whom Engels had inadvertently introduced himself to at the 2013 USATF Outdoor Championships. Engels states his reasoning for joining the Oregon Project as largely the result of Ryan Vanhoy's (Engels coach at Ole Miss) advice and because they had the coolest gear. Vanhoy himself had briefly coached NOP Member Eric Jenkins while at Northeastern. While Engels could have joined NOP during the USATF Championships, he decided to wait until he was able to make an official visit to Portland and meet all the major players. After officially joining the Nike Oregon Project, Engels raced the Sir Walter Miler, where he finished a close second in 3:57.67 to former high school standout and professional Adidas athlete Drew Hunter's 3:57.32 efforts for first. This marks Engels first official time under 4:00 minutes in the mile, although his 3:35 1500m mark converts to a 3:53 mile.

During the 2018 indoor season, Engels knocked nearly four seconds off his mile personal best at the David Hemery Valentine Invitational at Boston University, finishing in 3:53.93. Engels' time was fast enough to qualify for the USATF Indoor Championships in Albuquerque, New Mexico. At the USATF Indoor Championships, Engels finished third behind Ben Blankenship and Paul Chelimo, the former not having run the qualifying time for the IAAF Indoor Championships. Because of this, Engels made his first world championships team, where he finished 7th in the finals in 3:58.92, only .73 seconds behind World Indoor Champion Samuel Tefera.

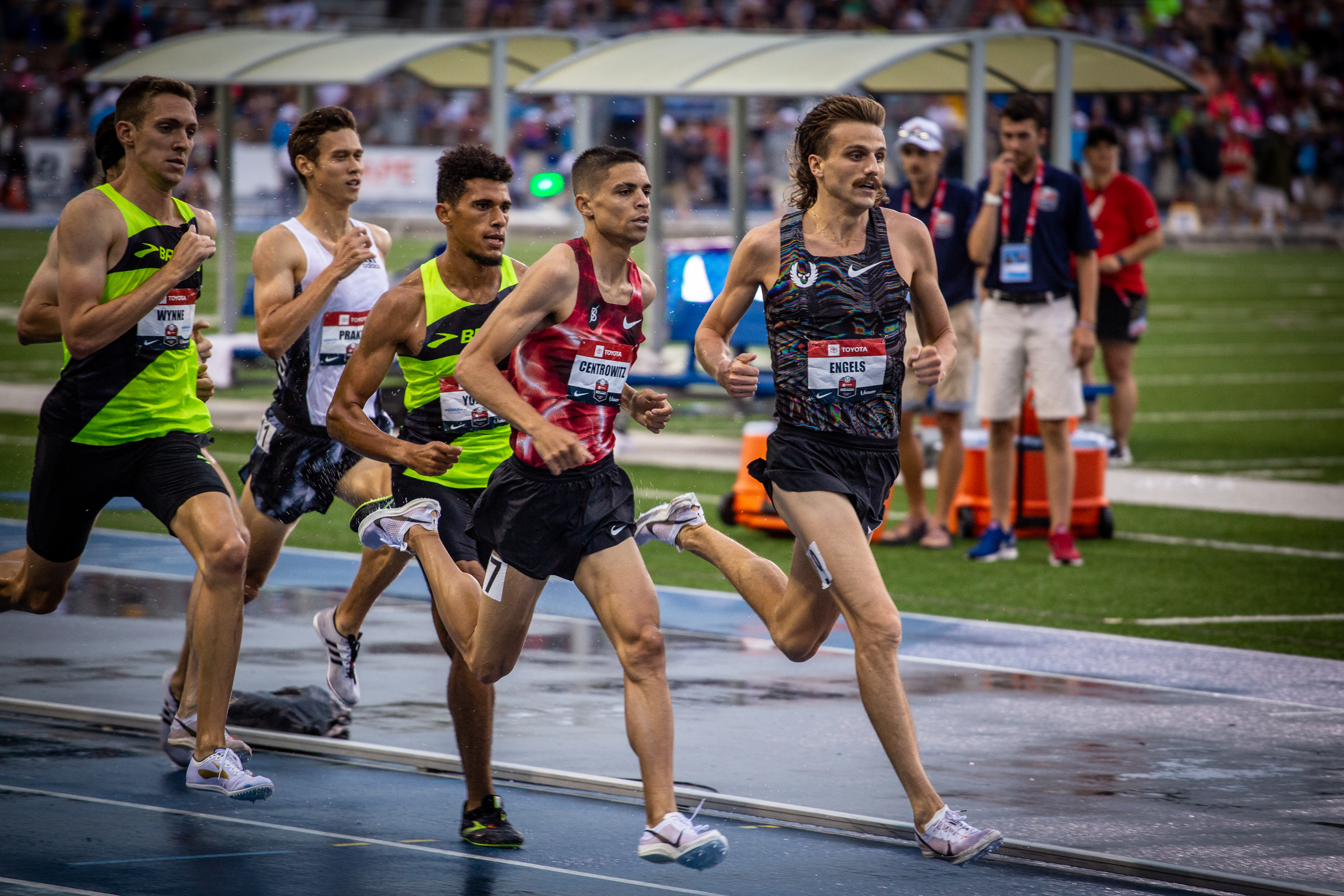
Engels at the 2019 US Track & Field Championship

On July 28, 2019 Engels won the 1500m final at the 2019 USATF Outdoor Championships. Engels ran a 3:44.93, beating out 2016 Olympic gold medalist Matthew Centrowitz by 0.04 seconds in a tactical race which displayed the advantage of commanding the race from the front in lane 1.

On September 6, 2019 Engels finished 5th in the 1500 at the Diamond League final in Brussels, Belgium running a PR of 3:34.04. His time was under the Olympic Standard (3:35.00).

Engels finished 10th in the IAAF World Championships 1500 final in Doha, Qatar on October 6, 2019. He faded out of medal contention in the last 600 meters but still ran 3:34.24, just .20 off his personal best. The race was won by Kenya's Timothy Cheruiyot in 3:29.26, who led gun to wire in one of the fastest World Championships 1500s in history.

During the 2021 Olympic Trials, Engels finished 4th in the 1500m final at Eugene, Oregon.

Engels qualified for the 2024 US Olympic Trials in the 1500m. He finished in ninth place.
