= 2015 NCAA Division I Indoor Track and Field Championships =

- Dates: March 13–14, 2015
- Host city: Fayetteville, Arkansas; University of Arkansas
- Venue: Randal Tyson Track Center
- Events: 32

The 2015 NCAA Division I Indoor Track and Field Championships was the 51st NCAA Men's Division I Indoor Track and Field Championships and the 34th NCAA Women's Division I Indoor Track and Field Championships, held at the Randal Tyson Track Center in Fayetteville, Arkansas near the campus of the host school, the University of Arkansas. In total, thirty-two different men's and women's indoor track and field events were contested from March 13 to March 14, 2015.

== Results ==
=== Men's results ===
==== 60 meters ====
- Final results shown, not prelims

Rank	Name	University	Time	Notes
1st place, gold medalist(s)	Ronnie Baker	TCU	6.52	
2nd place, silver medalist(s)	John Teeters	Oklahoma State	6.54	
3rd place, bronze medalist(s)	Jalen Miller	Mississippi	6.57	
4	Senoj-Jay Givans Jamaica	Texas	6.58	
5	Markesh Woodson	Missouri	6.62	6.611
6	Christian Coleman	Tennessee	6.62	6.618
7	Tevin Hester	Clemson	6.63	
8	Desmond Lawrence	North Carolina A&T	6.65	

==== 60-m hurdles ====
- Final results shown, not prelims

Rank	Name	University	Time	Notes
1st place, gold medalist(s)	Omar McLeod Jamaica	Arkansas	7.45	
2nd place, silver medalist(s)	Chris Caldwell	Texas Tech	7.69	
3rd place, bronze medalist(s)	Trey Holloway	Hampton	7.72	
4	William Taylor	Arizona State	7.75	
5	Adarius Washington	Indiana State	7.78	
6	Aaron Mallett	Iowa	7.79	
7	Oladapo Akinmoladun	Nebraska	7.80	
8	Teivaskie Lewin	South Dakota	7.81	

==== 200 meters ====
- Final results shown, not prelims

Rank	Name	University	Time	Notes
1st place, gold medalist(s)	Trayvon Bromell	Baylor	20.19	
2nd place, silver medalist(s)	Andre De Grasse Canada	USC	20.26	
3rd place, bronze medalist(s)	Brice Robinson	Tulsa	20.75	
4	Aaron Ernest	LSU	20.76	
5	Dedric Dukes	Florida	20.85	
6	Tevin Hester	Clemson	20.86	
7	Shavez Hart Jamaica	Texas A&M	20.89	
8	Sam Watts	TCU	21.01	

==== 400 meters ====
- Final results shown, not prelims

Rank	Name	University	Time	Notes
1st place, gold medalist(s)	Vernon Norwood	LSU	45.31	
2nd place, silver medalist(s)	Bralon Taplin Grenada	Texas A&M	45.55	
3rd place, bronze medalist(s)	Najee Glass	Florida	45.77	
4	Deon Lendore Trinidad and Tobago	Texas A&M	45.81	
5	Quincy Downing	LSU	46.13	
6	Zack Bilderback	Texas	46.49	
7	DJ Zahn	Illinois	46.69	
8	Arman Hall	Florida	DNF	

==== 800 meters ====
- Final results shown, not prelims

Rank	Name	University	Time	Notes
1st place, gold medalist(s)	Edward Kemboi Kenya	Iowa State	1:46.05	
2nd place, silver medalist(s)	Dylan Capwell	Monmouth	1:46.70	
3rd place, bronze medalist(s)	Clayton Murphy	Akron	1:47.06	
4	Brandon McBride Canada	Mississippi State	1:47.16	
5	Ryan Manahan	Georgetown	1:47.56	
6	Alex Amankwah Ghana	Alabama	1:48.03	
7	Ryan Schnulle	Florida	1:50.93	
8	Tre'tez Kinnaird	Indiana	1:51.98	

==== Mile ====
- Final results shown, not prelims

Rank	Name	University	Time	Notes
1st place, gold medalist(s)	Edward Cheserek	Oregon	3:57.94	
2nd place, silver medalist(s)	Cristian Soratos Mexico	Montana State	3:59.86	
3rd place, bronze medalist(s)	Anthony Rotich	UTEP	4:01.78	
4	John Gregorek Jr.	Oregon	4:04.30	
5	Chad Noelle	Oklahoma State	4:04.36	
6	Daniel Winn	Oregon	4:04.44	
7	Brannon Kidder	Penn State	4:04.48	
8	Keffri Neal	Kentucky	4:04.93	
9	Ahmed Bile	Georgetown	4:05.21	
10	Jake Hurysz	Colorado	4:07.91	

==== 3000 meters ====
- Final results shown, not prelims. Only top ten results shown

Rank	Name	University	Time	Notes
1st place, gold medalist(s)	Eric Jenkins	Oregon	7:58.81	
2nd place, silver medalist(s)	Edward Cheserek	Oregon	7:59.42	
3rd place, bronze medalist(s)	Will Geoghegan	Oregon	8:00.44	
4	Kemoy Campbell Jamaica	Arkansas	8:00.57	
5	Morgan Pearson	Colorado	8:01.89	
6	Adam Bitchell	New Mexico	8:02.72	
7	Martin Hehir	Syracuse	8:03.38	
8	Thomas Curtin	Virginia Tech	8:03.56	
9	Parker Stinson	Oregon	8:03.63	
10	Stanley Kebenei	Arkansas	8:03.78	

==== 5000 meters ====
- Final results shown, not prelims. Only top ten results shown

Rank	Name	University	Time	Notes
1st place, gold medalist(s)	Eric Jenkins	Oregon	13:48.36	
2nd place, silver medalist(s)	Kemoy Campbell Jamaica	Arkansas	13:49.55	
3rd place, bronze medalist(s)	Parker Stinson	Oregon	13:52.79	
4	Jason Witt	BYU	13:53.64	
5	Marc Scott United Kingdom	Tulsa	13:54.25	
6	Pierce Murphy	Colorado	13:54.36	
7	Will Geoghegan	Oregon	13:56.11	
8	Thomas Curtin	Virginia Tech	13:57.87	
9	Mark Parrish	Florida	14:01.21	
10	Ammar Moussa	Colorado	14:01.22	

==== Distance Medley Relay ====
- Leg 1 is 1200 meters, Leg 2 is 400 meters, Leg 3 is 800 meters, and Leg 4 is 1600 meters. Only top three final results shown

Rank	School	Competitors	Time	Notes
1st place, gold medalist(s)	Oregon	Leg 1: Colby Alexander; Leg 2: Marcus Chambers; Leg 3: Niki Franzmair; Leg 4: Edward Cheserek	9:30.53	
2nd place, silver medalist(s)	Penn State	Leg 1: Brannon Kidder; Leg 2: Alex Shisler; Leg 3: Za'Von Watkins; Leg 4: Robby Creese	9:32.21	
3rd place, bronze medalist(s)	Iowa State	Leg 1: Edward Kemboi Kenya; Leg 2: Brandon Barnes; Leg 3: Patrick Peterson; Leg 4: Christian DeLago	9:32.48	

=== Women's results ===
==== 60 meters ====
- Final results shown, not prelims

Rank	Name	University	Time	Notes
1st place, gold medalist(s)	Remona Burchell Jamaica	Alabama	7.12	
2nd place, silver medalist(s)	Ky Westbrook	USC	7.21	
3rd place, bronze medalist(s)	Jasmine Todd	Oregon	7.22	
4	Jenna Prandini	Oregon	7.24	
5	Mikiah Brisco	LSU	7.25	
6	Shayla Sanders	Florida	7.26	
7	Dezerea Bryant	Kentucky	7.27	
8	Aaliyah Brown	Texas A&M	7.32	

==== 60-m hurdles ====
- Final results shown, not prelims

Rank	Name	University	Time	Notes
1st place, gold medalist(s)	Kendra Harrison	Kentucky	7.87	
2nd place, silver medalist(s)	Bridgette Owens	Florida	7.88	
3rd place, bronze medalist(s)	Morgan Snow	Texas	8.08	
4	Le'Tristan Pledger	Texas Tech	8.17	
5	Sasha Wallace	Oregon	8.23	
6	Erica Bougard	Mississippi State	8.25	
7	Nnenya Hailey	Arizona	8.31	
8	Dior Hall	USC	8.48	

==== 200 meters ====
- Final results shown, not prelims

Rank	Name	University	Time	Notes
1st place, gold medalist(s)	Kyra Jefferson	Florida	22.63	
2nd place, silver medalist(s)	Jenna Prandini	Oregon	22.74	
3rd place, bronze medalist(s)	Dezerea Bryant	Kentucky	22.86	
4	Cierra White	Texas Tech	22.90	
5	A'Keyla Mitchell	Kansas State	22.96	
6	Ariana Washington	Oregon	23.07	
7	Kamaria Brown	Texas A&M	23.15	
8	Ashton Purvis	Texas A&M	23.27	

==== 400 meters ====
- Final results shown, not prelims

Rank	Name	University	Time	Notes
1st place, gold medalist(s)	Courtney Okolo	Texas	51.12	
2nd place, silver medalist(s)	Taylor Ellis-Watson	Arkansas	51.52	
3rd place, bronze medalist(s)	Ashley Spencer	Texas	51.85	
4	Shamier Little	Texas A&M	52.21	
5	Kala Funderburk	Florida State	52.51	
6	Margaret Bamgbose Nigeria	Notre Dame	52.65	
7	Brianna Tate	Arizona State	52.67	
8	Robin Reynolds	Florida	53.14	

==== 800 meters ====
- Final results shown, not prelims

Rank	Name	University	Time	Notes
1st place, gold medalist(s)	Natoya Goule Jamaica	Clemson	2:01.64	
2nd place, silver medalist(s)	Kaela Edwards	Oklahoma State	2:03.59	
3rd place, bronze medalist(s)	Olicia Williams	Baylor	2:03.67	
4	Chrishuna Williams	Arkansas	2:04.33	
5	Hanna Green	Virginia Tech	2:05.29	
6	Elizabeth Whelan	North Carolina	2:05.61	
7	Shea Martinez	BYU	2:05.75	
8	Brooke Feldemeier	Mississippi	2:05.80	

==== Mile ====
- Final results shown, not prelims

Rank	Name	University	Time	Notes
1st place, gold medalist(s)	Leah O'Connor	Michigan State	4:27.18	
2nd place, silver medalist(s)	Shelby Houlihan	Arizona State	4:28.71	
3rd place, bronze medalist(s)	Colleen Quigley	Florida State	4:31.24	
4	Rosie Clarke United Kingdom	Iona	4:31.75	
5	Erin Teschuk	North Dakota State	4:32.35	
6	Sammy Silva	New Mexico	4:35.44	
7	Angel Piccirillo	Villanova	4:37.96	
8	Nikki Hiltz	Oregon	4:38.47	
9	Stephanie Schappert	Villanova	4:38.63	
10	Mariah Kelly	Baylor	4:55.81	

==== 3000 meters ====
- Final results shown, not prelims. Only top ten results shown

Rank	Name	University	Time	Notes
1st place, gold medalist(s)	Dominique Scott South Africa	Arkansas	8:55.19	
2nd place, silver medalist(s)	Elise Cranny	Stanford	8:58.88	
3rd place, bronze medalist(s)	Emily Sisson	Providence	9:01.16	9:01.155
4	Katrina Coogan	Georgetown	9:01.16	9:01.160
5	Jessica Tonn	Stanford	9:01.84	
6	Rachel Johnson	Baylor	9:02.50	
7	Erin Teschuk Canada	North Dakota State	9:07.92	
8	Shelby Houlihan	Arizona State	9:09.61	
9	Rachele Schulist	Michigan State	9:09.78	
10	Katy Moen	Iowa State	9:13.83	

==== 5000 meters ====
- Final results shown, not prelims. Only top ten results shown

Rank	Name	University	Time	Notes
1st place, gold medalist(s)	Emily Sisson	Providence	15:32.15	
2nd place, silver medalist(s)	Rachel Johnson	Baylor	15:40.35	
3rd place, bronze medalist(s)	Sarah Disanza	Wisconsin-Madison	15:47.32	
4	Chelsea Blaase	Tennessee	15:47.52	
5	Courtney Frerichs	UMKC	15:47.56	
6	Molly Seidel	Notre Dame	15:48.31	
7	Diane Robison	Arkansas	15:52.07	
8	Sandie Raines	Virginia Tech	15:55.59	
9	Liv Westphal France	Texas	16:00.56	
10	Megan Curham	Princeton	16:07.46	

==== Distance Medley Relay ====
- Leg 1 is 1200 meters, Leg 2 is 400 meters, Leg 3 is 800 meters, and Leg 4 is 1600 meters. Only top three final results shown

Rank	School	Competitors	Time	Notes
1st place, gold medalist(s)	Arkansas	Leg 1: Jessica Kamilos; Leg 2: Sparkle McKnight Trinidad and Tobago; Leg 3: Therese Haiss; Leg 4: Dominique Scott South Africa	10:51.89	
2nd place, silver medalist(s)	Stanford	Leg 1: Jessica Tonn; Leg 2: Olivia Baker; Leg 3: Claudia Saunders; Leg 4: Elise Cranny	10:53.66	
3rd place, bronze medalist(s)	Michigan	Leg 1: Shannon Osika; Leg 2: Maya Long; Leg 3: Danielle Pfeifer; Leg 4: Brook Handler	10:58.64	

== See also ==
- NCAA Men's Division I Indoor Track and Field Championships
- NCAA Women's Division I Indoor Track and Field Championships
