= 2015 NCAA Division I Outdoor Track and Field Championships =

- Edition: 94th (Men); 34th (Women)
- Dates: June 10–13, 2015
- Host city: Eugene, Oregon; University of Oregon
- Venue: Hayward Field
- Events: 42

The 2015 NCAA Division I Outdoor Track and Field Championships was held from June 10 to June 13, 2015. This was the 94th NCAA Men's Division I Outdoor Track and Field Championships and the 34th NCAA Women's Division I Outdoor Track and Field Championships. The meet was held for the third consecutive year at Hayward Field in Eugene, Oregon, on the campus of the University of Oregon.

In total, 42 different men's and women's track and field events were contested. The men's distance events were historically slow due to wind and heat. University of Oregon was the overall men's and women's winner of the meet by points.

== Results ==
=== Men's events ===
==== 100 meters ====
- Only top eight final results shown; no prelims are listed

Wind: +2.7 mps

Rank	Name	University	Time	Notes
1st place, gold medalist(s)	Andre De Grasse Canada	USC	9.75	
2nd place, silver medalist(s)	Trayvon Bromell	Baylor	9.88	
3rd place, bronze medalist(s)	Jarrion Lawson	Arkansas	9.90	
4	Senoj-Jay Givans Jamaica	Texas	9.97	
5	Kendal Williams	Florida State	9.98	
6	Tevin Hester	Clemson	10.03	10.027
7	Kolby Listenbee	TCU	10.03	10.029
8	Clayton Vaughn	Texas-Arlington	10.04	

==== 200 meters ====
- Only top eight final results shown; no prelims are listed

Wind: +2.4 mps

Rank	Name	University	Time	Notes
1st place, gold medalist(s)	Andre De Grasse Canada	USC	19.58	
2nd place, silver medalist(s)	Dedric Dukes	Florida	19.86	19.856
3rd place, bronze medalist(s)	Trayvon Bromell	Baylor	19.86	19.858
4	Tremayne Acy	LSU	20.04	
5	Aaron Ernest	LSU	20.11	
6	Tevin Hester	Clemson	20.29	
7	Kahlil Henderson	Auburn	20.38	
8	Kendal Williams	Florida State	20.45	

==== 400 meters ====
- Only top eight final results shown; no prelims are listed

Rank	Name	University	Time	Notes
1st place, gold medalist(s)	Vernon Norwood	LSU	45.10	
2nd place, silver medalist(s)	Marcus Chambers	Oregon	45.59	
3rd place, bronze medalist(s)	DJ Zahn	Illinois	45.97	
4	Najee Glass	Florida	46.31	
5	Steven Gayle	Alabama	46.32	
6	Zack Bilderback	Texas	46.50	
7	Ceo Ways	North Carolina	46.52	
-	Deon Lendore Trinidad and Tobago	Texas A&M	DNF	

==== 800 meters ====
- Only top eight final results shown; no prelims are listed

Rank	Name	University	Time	Notes
1st place, gold medalist(s)	Edward Kemboi	Iowa State	1:49.26	
2nd place, silver medalist(s)	Brannon Kidder	Penn State	1:49.36	
3rd place, bronze medalist(s)	Clayton Murphy	Akron	1:49.52	
4	Jesse Garn	Binghamton	1:49.74	
5	Shaquille Walker	BYU	1:49.99	
6	Brandon McBride	Mississippi State	1:50.11	
7	Collins Kibet	Arizona	1:50.35	
8	Andres Arroyo Puerto Rico	Florida	1:50.67	

==== 1500 meters ====
- Only top eight final results shown; no prelims are listed

Rank	Name	University	Time	Notes
1st place, gold medalist(s)	Chad Noelle	Oklahoma State	3:54.96	
2nd place, silver medalist(s)	Zach Perkins	Air Force	3:55.08	
3rd place, bronze medalist(s)	Blake Haney	Oregon	3:55.12	
4	Peter Callahan	New Mexico	3:55.22	
5	Jordan Williamsz	Villanova	3:55.36	
6	Kyle Graves	Wake Forest	3:55.39	
7	Cristian Soratos	Montana State	3:55.60	
8	David Elliot	Boise State	3:55.86	

==== 5000 meters ====
- Only top eight final results shown

Rank	Name	University	Time	Notes
1st place, gold medalist(s)	Edward Cheserek	Oregon	13:48.67	
2nd place, silver medalist(s)	Eric Jenkins	Oregon	13:48.92	
3rd place, bronze medalist(s)	Kemoy Campbell Jamaica	Arkansas	13:49.23	
4	Will Geoghegan	Oregon	13:49.35	
5	Woody Kincaid	Portland	13:49.54	
6	Justyn Knight	Syracuse	13:50.96	
7	Thomas Curtin	Stanford	13:52.11	
8	Sean McGorty	Stanford	13:53.63	

==== 10000 meters ====
- Only top eight final results shown

Rank	Name	University	Time	Notes
1st place, gold medalist(s)	Edward Cheserek	Oregon	28:58.92	
2nd place, silver medalist(s)	Eric Jenkins	Oregon	28:59.13	
3rd place, bronze medalist(s)	Jason Witt	BYU	29:04.58	
4	Craig Lutz	Texas	29:11.17	
5	Pierce Murphy	Colorado	29:15.18	
6	Matt McElroy	Northern Arizona	29:16.55	
7	Matt McClintock	Purdue	29:16.57	
8	Malachy Schrobligen	Wisconsin	29:17.07	

==== 110 meters hurdles ====
- Only top eight final results shown; no prelims are listed

Wind: +3.9 mps

Rank	Name	University	Time	Notes
1st place, gold medalist(s)	Omar McLeod Jamaica	Arkansas	13.01	
2nd place, silver medalist(s)	Johnathan Cabral Canada	Oregon	13.22	
3rd place, bronze medalist(s)	Isaac Willams	Houston	13.31	
4	Joshua Thompson	LSU	13.34	
5	Aaron Mallett	Iowa	13.40	
6	Spencer Dunkerley-Offor	Texas	13.45	
7	Justin Johnson	Clemson	13.56	
8	Cameron Hall	Savannah State	13.61	

==== 400 meters hurdles ====
- Only top eight final results shown; no prelims are listed

Rank	Name	University	Time	Notes
1st place, gold medalist(s)	Michael Stigler	Kansas	48.84	
2nd place, silver medalist(s)	Jordin Andrade	Boise State	49.24	
3rd place, bronze medalist(s)	David Kendziera	Illinois	49.56	
4	Quincy Downing	LSU	49.79	
5	Gregory Coleman	Texas A&M	50.15	
6	Jussi Kanervo Finland	South Carolina	50.20	
7	Eric Futch	Florida	50.90	
8	Desmond Palmer	Pittsburgh	51.57	

==== 3000 meters steeplechase ====
- Only top eight final results shown; no prelims are listed

Rank	Name	University	Time	Notes
1st place, gold medalist(s)	Anthony Rotich Kenya	UTEP	8:33.90	
2nd place, silver medalist(s)	Stanley Kebenei	Arkansas	8:34.28	
3rd place, bronze medalist(s)	Ole Hesselbjerg	Eastern Kentucky	8:36.09	
4	Brandon Doughty	Oklahoma	8:38.35	
5	Mike Hardy	Weber State	8:42.30	
6	Mark Parrish	Florida	8:42.34	
7	Dylan Lafond	Illinois	8:42.96	
8	Zak Seddon	Florida State	8:43.77	

==== 4 x 100 meters relay ====
- Only top eight final results shown; no prelims are listed

Rank	University	Time	Notes
1st place, gold medalist(s)	Arkansas	38.47	
2nd place, silver medalist(s)	TCU	38.59	
3rd place, bronze medalist(s)	LSU	38.62	
4	USC	38.75	
5	Texas A&M	38.77	
6	Florida	38.96	
7	Illinois	39.36	
8	Alabama	39.63	

==== 4 x 400 meters relay ====
- Only top eight final results shown; no prelims are listed

Rank	University	Time	Notes
1st place, gold medalist(s)	LSU	3:01.96	
2nd place, silver medalist(s)	Florida	3:02.48	
3rd place, bronze medalist(s)	Mississippi State	3:04.96	
4	Ohio State	3:05.35	
5	BYU	3:05.56	
6	Arkansas	3:05.91	
7	Texas A&M	3:06.85	
8	Illinois	3:07.10	

==== Long Jump ====
- Only top eight final results shown; no prelims are listed

Rank	Name	University	Distance	Wind	Best legal
1st place, gold medalist(s)	Marquis Dendy	Florida	8.43m (27-8)	+2.3	8.34m +1.4
2nd place, silver medalist(s)	Jarrion Lawson	Arkansas	8.34m (27-4 1/2)	+0.2	
3rd place, bronze medalist(s)	Roelf Pienaar	Arkansas State	8.01 (26-3 1/2)	+1.6	
4	Jonathan Addison	North Carolina State	7.99m (26-2 3/4)	+2.3	7.83m +0.6
5	Adoree Jackson	USC	7.91m (25-11 1/2)	+1.9	
6	Laderrick Ward	SIU-Edwardsville	7.82 (25-8)	+2.5	7.46m +1.0
7	Walter Jones	California	7.79 (25-6 3/4)	+1.9	
8	Ventavius Sears	Western Kentucky	7.76 (25-5 1/2)	+1.9	

==== Triple Jump ====
- Only top eight final results shown; no prelims are listed

Rank	Name	University	Distance	Wind	Best legal
1st place, gold medalist(s)	Marquis Dendy	Florida	17.71m (58-1 1/4)	+2.4	17.50 +1.2
2nd place, silver medalist(s)	Latario Collie	Texas A&M	17.01m (55-9 3/4)	+3.8	16.87 +1.8
3rd place, bronze medalist(s)	Donald Scott	Eastern Michigan	16.83m (55-2 3/4)	+2.5	16.71 +1.9
4	Ben Williams	Louisville	16.74m (54-11 1/4)	+1.4	
5	Jonathan Reid	Florida State	16.52m (54-2 1/2)	+2.2	
6	Jeremiah Green	Alabama	16.50m (54-1 3/4)	+4.2	
7	Clive Pullen	Arkansas	16.27m (53-4 1/2)	+4.2	
8	Steve Waithe	Penn State	16.26m (53-4 1/4)	+3.4	14.16 +2.0

==== High Jump ====
- Only top eight final results shown; no prelims are listed

Rank	Name	University	Height	Notes
1st place, gold medalist(s)	Jacorian Duffield	Texas Tech	2.28m (7-5 3/4)	
2nd place, silver medalist(s)	Bradley Adkins	Texas Tech	2.25m (7-4 1/2)	
3rd place, bronze medalist(s)	Avion Jones	East Carolina	2.25m (7-4 1/2)	
4	Marcus Jackson	Mississippi State	2.22m (7-3 1/4)	
5	Wally Ellenson	Marquette	2.19m (7-2 1/4)	
6	Bryan McBride	Arizona State	2.19m (7-2 1/4)	
7	James White	Nebraska	2.19m (7-2 1/4)	
8 (tie)	Randall Cunningham II	USC	2.16m (7-1)	
8 (tie)	Shawn Johnson	Auburn	2.16m (7-1)	

==== Pole Vault ====
- Only top eight final results shown; no prelims are listed

Rank	Name	University	Height	Notes
1st place, gold medalist(s)	Shawn Barber Canada	Akron	5.60 (18-4 1/2)	
2nd place, silver medalist(s)	Pauls Pujats	Memphis	5.55 (18-2 1/2)	
3rd place, bronze medalist(s)	Dylan Duvio	Stanford	5.50 (18-0 1/2)	
4	Audie Wyatt	Texas A&M	5.50 (18-0 1/2)	
5	Adrian Valles Spain	Cincinnati	5.50 (18-0 1/2)	
6 (tie)	Logan Plibsen	New Mexico	5.40 (17-8 1/2)	
6 (tie)	Jake Blankenship	Tennessee	5.40 (17-8 1/2)	
8	Craig Hunter	Connecticut	5.40 (17-8 1/2)	

==== Shot Put ====
- Only top eight final results shown; no prelims are listed

Rank	Name	University	Distance	Notes
1st place, gold medalist(s)	Jonathan Jones	Buffalo	20.78m (68-2 1/4 )	20.57
2nd place, silver medalist(s)	Darrell Hill	Penn State	20.78m (68-2 1/4 )	20.27
3rd place, bronze medalist(s)	Stipe Zunic Croatia	Florida	20.30m (66-7 1/4 )	
4	Josh Freeman	Southern Illinois	20.15m (66-1 1/2 )	
5	Ryan Crouser	Texas	19.99m (65-7 )	
6	Nick Vena	Georgia	19.80m (64-11 1/2 )	
7	JC Murasky	Ohio State	19.61m (64-4 )	
8	Nicholas Ponzio	USC	19.53m (64-1 )	

==== Discus throw ====
- Only top eight final results shown; no prelims are listed

Rank	Name	University	Distance	Notes
1st place, gold medalist(s)	Sam Mattis	Penn	62.48m (205-0)	
2nd place, silver medalist(s)	Tavis Bailey	Tennessee	61.92m (203-2)	
3rd place, bronze medalist(s)	Filip Mihaljevic	Virginia	61.29m (201-1)	
4	Antonio James	Michigan State	60.99m (200-1)	
5	Ryan Crouser	Texas	60.18m (197-5)	
6	Jordan Young	Virginia	60.13m (197-3)	
7	Cody Snyder	South Dakota	59.04m (193-8)	
8	Michael Ohakwe	Arizona State	58.49m (191–10)	

==== Javelin throw ====
- Only top eight final results shown; no prelims are listed

Rank	Name	University	Distance	Notes
1st place, gold medalist(s)	Sam Crouser	Oregon	79.19m (259-9 )	
2nd place, silver medalist(s)	John Ampomah	Middle Tennessee State	77.13m (253-0 )	
3rd place, bronze medalist(s)	Curtis Thompson	Mississippi State	75.42m (247-5 )	
4	Raymond Dykstra	Kentucky	74.90m (245-9 )	
5	Ioannis Kyriazis	Texas A&M	73.13m (239–11 )	
6	Thomas Lang	Duke	72.50m (237–10 )	
7	Matti Mortimore	North Dakota State	72.44m (237-8 )	
8	Kyle Bynum	Memphis	70.07m (229–10 )	

==== Hammer throw ====
- Only top eight final results shown; no prelims are listed

Rank	Name	University	Distance	Notes
1st place, gold medalist(s)	Conor McCullough	USC	76.91m (252-4 )	
2nd place, silver medalist(s)	Matthias Tayala	Kent State	71.56m (234-9 )	
3rd place, bronze medalist(s)	Greg Skipper	Oregon	71.25m (233-9 )	
4	Tomas Kruzliak	Virginia Tech	226-8	
5	Renaldo Frechou	South Alabama	225-2	
6	Chukwuebuka Enekwechi	Purdue	224-6	
7	Jordan Young	Virginia	223-7	
8	Rudy Winkler	Cornell	223-5	

==== Decathlon ====
- Only top eight final results shown; no prelims are listed

Rank	Name	University	Points	Notes
1st place, gold medalist(s)	Maicel Uibo Estonia	Georgia	8,356	
2nd place, silver medalist(s)	Pau Tonnesen Spain	Arizona	8,247	
3rd place, bronze medalist(s)	Dakotah Keys	Oregon	7,863	
4	Harrison Williams	Stanford	7,806	
5	Tim Ehrhardt	Michigan State	7,677	
6	Stephen Soerens	Princeton	7,669	
7	Wolf Mahler	Texas	7,650	
8	Scott Filip	Rice	7,647	

=== Women's events ===
==== 100 meters ====
- Only top eight final results shown; no prelims are listed

Wind: +3.1 mps

Rank	Name	University	Time	Notes
1st place, gold medalist(s)	Jenna Prandini	Oregon	10.96	
2nd place, silver medalist(s)	Morolake Akinosun	Texas	10.97	
3rd place, bronze medalist(s)	Dezerea Bryant	Kentucky	11.01	
4	Ky Westbrook	USC	11.11	
5	Aaliyah Brown	Texas A&M	11.14	
6	Aleia Hobbs	LSU	11.16	
7	Keilah Tyson	Kentucky	11.21	
8	Jennifer Madu	Texas A&M	11.45	

==== 200 meters ====
- Only top eight final results shown; no prelims are listed

Wind: +1.9 mps

Rank	Name	University	Time	Notes
1st place, gold medalist(s)	Dezerea Bryant	Kentucky	22.18	
2nd place, silver medalist(s)	Jenna Prandini	Oregon	22.21	
3rd place, bronze medalist(s)	Kamaria Brown	Texas A&M	22.24	22.232
4	Kyra Jefferson	Florida	22.24	22.240
5	Morolake Akinosun	Texas	22.52	
6	Aaliyah Brown	Texas A&M	22.76	
7	Cierra White	Texas Tech	22.94	
8	Jada Martin	LSU	22.97	

==== 400 meters ====
- Only top eight final results shown; no prelims are listed

Rank	Name	University	Time	Notes
1st place, gold medalist(s)	Kala Funderburk	Florida State	51.67	
2nd place, silver medalist(s)	Kendall Baisden	Texas	51.74	51.739
3rd place, bronze medalist(s)	Daye Shon Roberson	Oklahoma	51.74	51.740
4	Taylor Ellis-Watson	Arkansas	52.01	
5	Shakima Wimbley	Miami	52.08	
6	Margaret Bamgbose	Notre Dame	52.13	
7	Ashley Spencer	Texas	52.65	
8	Kiara Porter	VCU	52.67	

==== 800 meters ====
- Only top eight final results shown; no prelims are listed

Rank	Name	University	Time	Notes
1st place, gold medalist(s)	Raevyn Rogers	Oregon	1:59.71	
2nd place, silver medalist(s)	Claudia Saunders	Stanford	2:00.63	
3rd place, bronze medalist(s)	Hanna Green	Virginia Tech	2:01.17	
4	Chrishuna Williams	Arkansas	2:01.67	
5	Alethia Marrero	Indiana State	2:03.86	
6	Natoya Goule Jamaica	Clemson	2:05.19	
7	Claudia Francis	Florida	2:07.72	
8	Savannah Camacho	Oklahoma State	2:09.07	

==== 1500 meters ====
- Only top eight final results shown; no prelims are listed

Rank	Name	University	Time	Notes
1st place, gold medalist(s)	Rhianwedd Price	Miss State	4:09.56	
2nd place, silver medalist(s)	Shelby Houlihan	Arizona State	4:09.67	
3rd place, bronze medalist(s)	Sara Sutherland	Colorado	4:13.48	
4	Natalja Piliusina	Oklahoma State	4:15.01	
5	Raquel Lambdin	UC Davis	4:15.28	
6	Stephanie Schappert	Villanova	4:16.01	
7	Brook Handler	Michigan	4:16.19	
8	Linden Hall	Florida State	4:16.58	

==== 5000 meters ====
- Only top eight final results shown

Rank	Name	University	Time	Notes
1st place, gold medalist(s)	Emily Sisson	Providence	15:34.10	
2nd place, silver medalist(s)	Dominique Scott	Arkansas	15:40.47	
3rd place, bronze medalist(s)	Jessica Tonn	Stanford	15:41.72	
4	Kate Avery United Kingdom	Iona	15:41.95	
5	Erin Finn	Michigan	15:43.97	
6	Calli Thackery	New Mexico	15:47.15	
7	Shelby Houlihan	Arizona State	15:49.72	
8	Liv Westphal	Boston College	15:52.17	

==== 10000 meters ====
- Only top eight final results shown; no prelims are listed

Rank	Name	University	Time	Notes
1st place, gold medalist(s)	Molly Seidel	Notre Dame	33:18.37	
2nd place, silver medalist(s)	Dominique Scott	Arkansas	33:25.81	
3rd place, bronze medalist(s)	Emily Stites	William & Mary	33:26.15	
4	Molly Grabill	Oregon	33:26.61	
5	Waverly Neer	Oregon	33:26.98	
6	Chelsea Blaase	Tennessee	33:27.73	
7	Margo Malone	Syracuse	33:39.50	
8	Alice Wright	New Mexico	33:41.86	

==== 100 meters hurdles ====
- Only top eight final results shown; no prelims are listed

Wind: +1.7 mps

Rank	Name	University	Time	Notes
1st place, gold medalist(s)	Kendra Harrison	Kentucky	12.55	
2nd place, silver medalist(s)	Cindy Ofili United Kingdom	Michigan	12.60	
3rd place, bronze medalist(s)	Dior Hall	USC	12.74	
4	Jade Barber	Notre Dame	12.85	
5	Bridgette Owens	Florida	12.86	
6	Chanice Chase	LSU	12.95	
7	Devynne Charlton	Purdue	13.00	
8	Daeshon Gordon	LSU	13.29	

==== 400 meters hurdles ====
- Only top eight final results shown; no prelims are listed

Rank	Name	University	Time	Notes
1st place, gold medalist(s)	Shamier Little	Texas A&M	53.74	
2nd place, silver medalist(s)	Kendra Harrison	Kentucky	54.09	
3rd place, bronze medalist(s)	Leah Nugent	Kentucky	55.82	
4	Sage Watson Canada	Florida State	55.97	
5	Jade Miller	Harvard	56.68	
6	Nnenya Hailey	Arizona	56.98	
7	Amalie Iuel Denmark	USC	56.99	
8	Jaide Stepter	USC	57.12	

==== 3000 meters steeplechase ====
- Only top eight final results shown; no prelims are listed

Rank	Name	University	Time	Notes
1st place, gold medalist(s)	Colleen Quigley	Florida State	9:29.32	
2nd place, silver medalist(s)	Courtney Frerichs	UMKC	9:31.36	
3rd place, bronze medalist(s)	Leah O'Connor	Michigan State	9:33.38	
4	Marisa Howard	Boise State	9:37.84	
5	Erin Teschuk Canada	North Dakota State	9:42.15	
6	Rachel Johnson	Baylor	9:42.93	
7	Elinor Purrier	New Hampshire	9:53.69	
8	Maddie Van Beek	North Dakota State	9:54.42	

==== 4 x 100 meters relay ====
- Only top eight final results shown; no prelims are listed

Rank	University	Time	Notes
1st place, gold medalist(s)	Florida	42.95	
2nd place, silver medalist(s)	Texas A&M	43.08	
3rd place, bronze medalist(s)	USC	43.27	
4	Texas	43.38	
5	LSU	43.69	
6	Purdue	44.55	
7	Mississippi	44.64	
-	Oregon	DQ	

==== 4 x 400 meters relay ====
- Only top eight final results shown; no prelims are listed

Rank	University	Time	Notes
1st place, gold medalist(s)	Florida	3:28.12	
2nd place, silver medalist(s)	USC	3:29.97	
3rd place, bronze medalist(s)	Florida State	3:31.78	
4	Purdue	3:31.98	
5	Miami	3:33.90	
6	Arkansas	3:34.27	
7	Texas A&M	3:34.41	
8	Texas	3:37.31	

==== Long Jump ====
- Only top eight final results shown; no prelims are listed

Rank	Name	University	Distance	Wind	Best legal
1st place, gold medalist(s)	Quanesha Burks	Alabama	6.91m (22-8 )	+2.6	
2nd place, silver medalist(s)	Jenna Prandini	Oregon	6.80m (22-3 3/4 )	+1.7	
3rd place, bronze medalist(s)	Sha'Keela Saunders	Kentucky	6.75m (22-1 3/4 )	+1.8	
4	Jasmine Todd	Oregon	6.65m (21-10 )	+2.7	
5	Sydney Conley	Kansas	6.60m (21-8 )	+3.4	
6	Der'Renae Freeman	Florida State	6.59m (21-7 1/2 )	+2.9	
7	Keturah Orji	Georgia	6.57m (21-6 3/4 )	+4.3	
8	Chanice Porter	Georgia	6.50m (21-4 )	+3.3	6.14 +1.6

==== Triple Jump ====
- Only top eight final results shown; no prelims are listed

Rank	Name	University	Distance	Wind	Best legal
1st place, gold medalist(s)	Keturah Orji	Georgia	14.15m (46-5 1/4 )	+1.8	AJR
2nd place, silver medalist(s)	Marshay Ryan	Auburn	13.53m (44-4 3/4 )	+1.5	
3rd place, bronze medalist(s)	Simone Charley	Vanderbilt	13.49m (44-3 1/4 )	+2.7	13.32 +1.2
4	Nadia Eke	Columbia	13.46m (44-2 )	+3.1	13.23 +1.8
5	Tori Franklin	Michigan State	13.38m (43-10 3/4 )	+5.3	13.16 +2.0
6	Nataliyah Friar	LSU	13.32m (43-8 1/2 )	+2.8	13.21 +1.9
7	Allie Saunders	Texas State	13.25m (43-5 3/4 )	+2.6	13.04 +1.7
8	Daisy Ding	Rice	13.18m (43-3 )	+4.1	13.17 +1.9

==== High Jump ====
- Only top eight final results shown; no prelims are listed

Rank	Name	University	Height	Notes
1st place, gold medalist(s)	Jeannelle Scheper Saint Lucia	South Carolina	1.90m (6-2 3/4 )	
2nd place, silver medalist(s)	Kimberly Williamson	Kansas State	1.90m (6-2 3/4 )	
3rd place, bronze medalist(s)	Leontia Kallenou Cyprus	Georgia	1.87m (6-1 1/2 )	
4	Akela Jones Barbados	Kansas State	1.87m (6-1 1/2 )	
5	Tatiana Gusin	Georgia	1.84m (6-1/2 )	
6	Claudia Garcia Jou Spain	Akron	1.81m (5-11 1/4 )	
7	Erika Hurd	Cincinnati	1.81m (5-11 1/4 )	
7	Marusa Cernjul	Nebraska	1.81m (5-11 1/4 )	

==== Pole Vault ====
- Only top eight final results shown; no prelims are listed

Rank	Name	University	Height	Notes
1st place, gold medalist(s)	Demi Payne	Stephen F. Austin	15-5	
2nd place, silver medalist(s)	Sandi Morris	Arkansas	15-3	
3rd place, bronze medalist(s)	Stephanie Richartz	Illinois	14-7 1/4	
4	Kristina Owsinski	Washington	14-5 1/4	
5	Desiree Freier	Arkansas	14-3 1/4	
6	Anginae Monteverde	BYU	14-1 1/4	
7	Ariel Voskamp	Arkansas	14-1 1/4	
8	Kimyanna Rudolph	Indiana State	13-9 1/4	

==== Shot Put ====
- Only top eight final results shown; no prelims are listed

Rank	Name	University	Distance	Notes
1st place, gold medalist(s)	Raven Saunders	Southern Illinois	60-2 1/2	
2nd place, silver medalist(s)	Kelsey Card	Wisconsin	58-11 1/4	
3rd place, bronze medalist(s)	Tori Bliss	LSU	58-6	
4	Dani Winters	Kansas State	57-10 1/2	
5	Brittany Mann	Oregon	56-6	
6	Christina Hillman	Iowa State	56-2 3/4	
7	Jill Rushin	Missouri	56-0	
8	Alexis Cooks	Akron	55-1	

==== Discus throw ====
- Only top eight final results shown; no prelims are listed

Rank	Name	University	Distance	Notes
1st place, gold medalist(s)	Shelbi Vaughan	Texas A&M	61.39m (201-5 )	
2nd place, silver medalist(s)	Kelsey Card	Wisconsin	59.38m (194–10 )	
3rd place, bronze medalist(s)	Emmonnie Henderson	Louisville	58.34m (191-5 )	
4	Tera Novy	USC	58.31m (191-3 )	
5	Valarie Allman	Stanford	56.37m (184–11 )	
6	Alexis Cooks	Akron	55.51m (182-1 )	
7	Beckie Famurewa	Kentucky	55.41m (181-9 )	
8	Alexandra Collatz	USC	55.37m (181-8 )	

==== Javelin Throw ====
- Only top eight final results shown; no prelims are listed

Rank	Name	University	Distance	Notes
1st place, gold medalist(s)	Irena Sediva Czech Republic	Virginia Tech	192-9	
2nd place, silver medalist(s)	Hannah Carson	Texas Tech	189-4	
3rd place, bronze medalist(s)	Elizabeth Herrs	Oklahoma	185-1	
4	Rebekah Wales	LSU	178-0	
5	Freya Jones	Georgia	177-6	
6	Nicolle Murphy	Minnesota	175-9	
7	Jessie Merckle	Wake Forest	174–10	
8	Fawn Miller	Florida	172-9	

==== Hammer Throw ====
- Only top eight final results shown; no prelims are listed

Rank	Name	University	Distance	Notes
1st place, gold medalist(s)	DeAnna Price	Southern Illinois	234-6	
2nd place, silver medalist(s)	Julia Radcliffe	Princeton	220-9	
3rd place, bronze medalist(s)	Brooke Pleger	Bowling Green	219–11	
4	Jillian Weir	Oregon	218–11	
5	Julia Reedy	Oklahoma	211-4	
6	Dana Levy	Kansas	208-1	
7	Jianna Williams	Illinois State	206-4	
8	Kearsten Peoples	Missouri	204-5	

==== Heptathlon ====
- Only top eight final results shown; no prelims are listed

Rank	Name	University	Score	Notes
1st place, gold medalist(s)	Akela Jones Barbados	Kansas State	6,371	
2nd place, silver medalist(s)	Kendell Williams	Georgia	6,223	
3rd place, bronze medalist(s)	Quintunya Chapman	Georgia	6,147	
4	Erica Bougard	Mississippi State	6,050	
5	Jess Herauf	Minnesota	5,965	
6	Jena Hemann	Texas A&M	5,913	
7	Xenia Rahn	North Carolina	5,851	
8	Nikki Larch-Miller	Wichita State	5,806	

== Standings ==
=== Men ===
- Only top ten teams shown

Rank	University	Score	Notes
1st place, gold medalist(s)	Oregon	85.0	
2nd place, silver medalist(s)	Florida	56.0	
3rd place, bronze medalist(s)	Arkansas	53.0	
4	LSU	45.0	
5	USC	40.50	
6	Texas A&M	27.0	
7	Texas	26.0	
8	Mississippi State	20.0	
9	Texas Tech	18.0	
10 (tie)	Penn State	17.0	
10 (tie)	Illinois	17.0	

=== Women ===
- Only top ten teams shown

Rank	University	Score	Notes
1st place, gold medalist(s)	Oregon	59.0	
2nd place, silver medalist(s)	Kentucky	50.0	
3rd place, bronze medalist(s)	Texas A&M	47.0	
4	Arkansas	43.0	
5	Georgia	41.0	
6	Florida State	35.0	
7	USC	34.0	
8	Florida	32.0	
9 (tie)	Kansas State	28.0	
9 (tie)	Texas	28.0	

== See also ==
- NCAA Men's Division I Outdoor Track and Field Championships
- NCAA Women's Division I Outdoor Track and Field Championships
