= Kaela Edwards =

American middle-distance runner

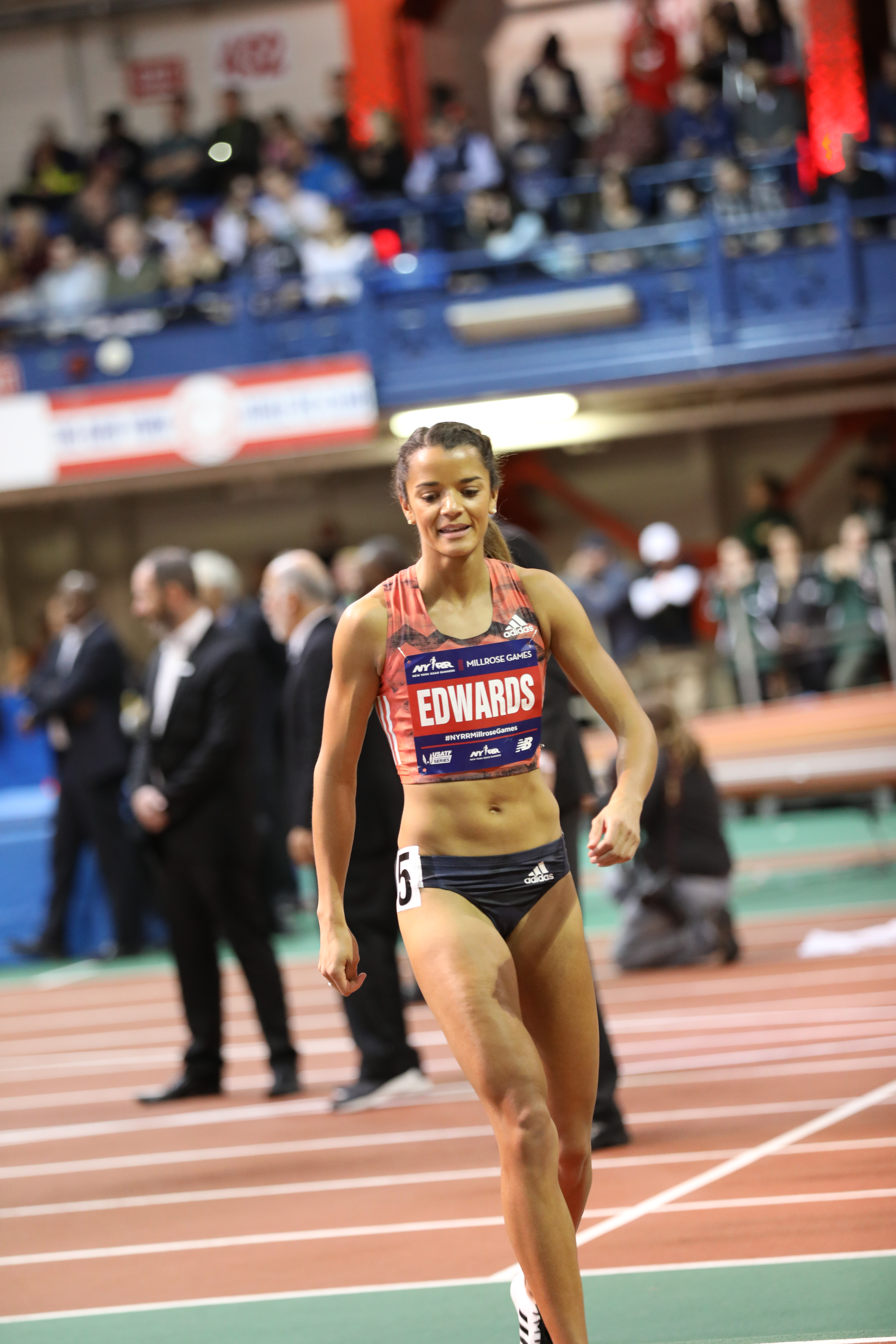
- Edwards at 2019 Millrose Games

Personal information
- Nationality: American
- Born: December 8, 1993 (age 32) Aurora, Colorado
- Height: 5 ft 7 in (1.70 m)

Sport
- Sport: Track and field
- Event(s): 800 metres 1500 metres 400 metres
- College team: Oklahoma State Cowgirls
- Club: Adidas
- Turned pro: 2017
- Coached by: Chad Noelle

Achievements and titles
Personal best
800 metres	1:59.68 (2018)
1500 metres	4:10.46 (2017)
Mile (i)	4:28.75 (2017)
400 metres	55.26 (2015)
Medal record
Women's athletics
Representing the United States

Kaela Edwards (born December 8, 1993) is an American middle-distance runner.

== Professional ==
Edwards began competing for Adidas and in Boulder. Edwards was coached by Joe Bosshard from 2017 to 2019. Edwards trained with two women who were trained by Bosshard and who made it to the 2016 Summer Olympics (Aisha Praught-Leer and Emma Coburn). After summer 2019, Chad Noelle began coaching Kaela Edwards.

Year	Competition	Venue	Position	Event	Time	Notes
Representing the United States
2023	World Championships	Budapest, Hungary	48th	800 m	2:02.22	

Year	US National Championship	Event	Venue	Place	Time
2023	2023 USA Outdoor Track and Field Championships	800 m	Eugene, Oregon	3rd	2:00.52
2023	2023 USA Indoor Track and Field Championships	800 m	Albuquerque, New Mexico	3rd	2:00.52
2020	2020 USA Indoor Track and Field Championships	800 m	Albuquerque, New Mexico	2nd	2:02.41
2019	2019 USA Outdoor Track and Field Championships	800 m	Des Moines, Iowa	27th	2:07.67
2019	2019 USA Indoor Track and Field Championships	1000 m	Staten Island, New York	9th	2:45.01
2018	2018 USA Outdoor Track and Field Championships	800 m	Des Moines, Iowa	8th	1:59.68
2018	2018 USA Indoor Track and Field Championships	800 m	Albuquerque, New Mexico	3rd	2:02.77
2017	2017 USA Outdoor Track and Field Championships	1500 m	Hornet Stadium (Sacramento)	19th	4:15.43
2016	USA Olympic Trials Track and Field Championships	800 m	Hayward Field; Eugene, Oregon	20th	2:03.307

== NCAA ==
Edwards attended Oklahoma State University and graduated in 2017.

Edwards was a 5-time NCAA Division I First Team All-American, the fourth most in Oklahoma State history behind Christine McMiken '86, Jackie Goodman '89 and Natalja Piliusina '15 and an NCAA Track champion. Edwards holds Oklahoma State Cowgirls school records in the 1000 meters (i), 1500 meters, one mile (i), 2nd place in DMR (11:01.15 - M. Sughroue, C. Nichols S. Camacho, K. Edwards at Arkansas Razorback Invitational 2016) and 3000 m (9:06.27).

School Year	Big 12 Conference Cross Country	NCAA Division I Cross Country	Big 12 Conference Indoor track and field	NCAA Division I Indoor track and field	Big 12 Conference Outdoor Track and Field	NCAA Division I Outdoor Track and Field
2016-17 Senior	13th, 21:11.7	80th, 20:44.4	800 m 1st, 2:04.77	Mile 4th, 4:34.27	1500 m 1st, 4:33.10	1500 m 15th, 4:19.40
2016-17 Senior	13th, 21:11.7	80th, 20:44.4	DMR, 1st, 11:19.02		4 × 400 m 8th, 3:40.59	1500 m 15th, 4:19.40
2015-16 Junior	4th, 20:51.1	70th, 20:39.3	Mile 1st, 4:46.73	Mile 1st, 4:35.62		1500 m 6th, 4:15.14
2015-16 Junior	4th, 20:51.1	70th, 20:39.3	1000 m 1st, 2:47.42			1500 m 6th, 4:15.14
2015-16 Junior	4th, 20:51.1	70th, 20:39.3	4 × 400 m, 5th, 3:42.77	DMR, 9th, 11:13.08		1500 m 6th, 4:15.14
2014-15 Sophomore			DMR 1st, 11:16.86	Mile, 2nd, 2:03.59	800 m 3rd, 2:10.48	800 m 22nd, 2:09.72
2014-15 Sophomore			1000 m 1st, 2:43.11	Mile, 2nd, 2:03.59	800 m 3rd, 2:10.48	800 m 22nd, 2:09.72
2013-14 Freshman	23rd, 21:30.6		DMR, 4th, 11:37.19	800 m 3rd, 2:05.72		
2013-14 Freshman	23rd, 21:30.6		800 m 2nd, 2:06.12	800 m 3rd, 2:05.72		

== High school ==
Edwards graduated from Littleton High School in Colorado. Edward was raised in hometown of Highlands Ranch, Colorado. Edwards placed 11th running 46.92 in 300 m hurdles and 8th in 400 m running 58.52 in 5A in 2010 Colorado All-Classification State Track Meet; won 800 m at 2011 Mt SAC Relays High School Invite, later placed 4th in 800 m running 2:10.73 & 4th in 400 m running 55.74 in 2011 Colorado All-Classification State Track Meet; Dana Gaetani, Grace Brittan, Rosa Hardarson, Kaela Edwards won Sprint medley relay at 2012 Mt SAC Relays High School Invite, later placed 2nd in 800 m running 2:10.61 & 2nd in 400 m running 55.68 in 2012 Colorado All-Classification State Track Meet.
