= 2014 NCAA Division I Indoor Track and Field Championships =

- Dates: March 14–15, 2014
- Host city: Albuquerque, New Mexico; University of New Mexico
- Venue: Albuquerque Convention Center
- Events: 32

The 2014 NCAA Division I Indoor Track and Field Championships was the 50th NCAA Men's Division I Indoor Track and Field Championships and the 33rd NCAA Women's Division I Indoor Track and Field Championships, held at the Albuquerque Convention Center in Albuquerque, New Mexico near the campus of the host school, the University of New Mexico. In total, thirty-two different men's and women's indoor track and field events were contested from March 14 to March 15, 2014.

== Results ==
=== Men's events ===
==== 60 meters ====
- Final results shown, not prelims

Rank	Name	University	Time	Notes
1st place, gold medalist(s)	Dentarius Locke	FSU	6.52	
2nd place, silver medalist(s)	Ryan Milus	Arizona State	6.57	
3rd place, bronze medalist(s)	Diondre Batson	Alabama	6.58	
4	Aaron Brown Canada	USC	6.60	
5	Antwan Wright	Florida	6.63	6.622
6	Cameron Burrell	Houston	6.63	6.629
7	Tevin Hester	Clemson	6.64	
8	Jalen Miller	MSU	6.69	

==== 60 meters with hurdles ====
- Final results shown, not prelims

Rank	Name	University	Time	Notes
1st place, gold medalist(s)	Omar McLeod Jamaica	Arkansas	7.58	
2nd place, silver medalist(s)	Eddie Lovett United States Virgin Islands	Florida	7.58	
3rd place, bronze medalist(s)	Wayne Davis	Texas A&M	7.61	
4	Johnathan Cabral Canada	Oregon	7.65	
5	Aleec Harris	USC	7.67	
6	Milan Ristić Serbia	California	7.68	NR
7	Donovan Robertson	Ohio State	7.69	
8	Greggmar Swift Barbados	Indiana State	7.85	

==== 200 meters ====
- Final results shown, not prelims

Rank	Name	University	Time	Notes
1st place, gold medalist(s)	Diondre Batson	Alabama	20.32	
2nd place, silver medalist(s)	Dedric Dukes	Florida	20.34	
3rd place, bronze medalist(s)	Carvin Nkanata	Pittsburg	20.52	
4	Arman Hall	Florida	20.55	
5	Tyreek Hill	Garden City CC	20.57	
6	Aaron Brown	USC	20.64	
7	Aldrich Bailey Jr.	Pittsburgh	20.66	
8	Bruno Hortelano-Roig Spain	TCU	20.75	

==== 400 meters ====
- Final results shown, not prelims

Rank	Name	University	Time	Notes
1st place, gold medalist(s)	Deon Lendore Trinidad and Tobago	Texas A&M	45.21	
2nd place, silver medalist(s)	Vernon Norwood	LSU	45.46	
3rd place, bronze medalist(s)	Arman Hall	Florida	45.52	
4	Michael Berry	Oregon	45.64	
5	Christopher Giesting	Notre Dame	45.74	
6	Brycen Spratling	Pittsburgh	46.08	
7	Patrick Feeney	Notre Dame	46.19	
8	Zack Bilderback	UT	47.63	
9	James Harris	FSU	DQ	Lane violation

==== 800 meters ====
- Final results shown, not prelims

Rank	Name	University	Time	Notes
1st place, gold medalist(s)	Brandon McBride	MSU	1:48.17	
2nd place, silver medalist(s)	Edward Kemboi	Iowa State	1:48.84	
3rd place, bronze medalist(s)	Patrick Rono	Arkansas	1:49.04	
4	Tomas Squella	Arkansas	1:49.23	
5	Ryan Schnulle	Florida	1:49.31	
6	Samuel Ellison	Villanova	1:50.13	
7	Za'Von Watkins	Penn State	1:50.25	
8	Jesse Jorgensen	Washington State	1:50.33	

==== Mile ====
- Final results shown, not prelims

Rank	Name	University	Time	Notes
1st place, gold medalist(s)	Anthony Rotich	UTEP	4:02.54	
2nd place, silver medalist(s)	Lawi Lalang	Arizona	4:02.81	
3rd place, bronze medalist(s)	Mac Fleet	Oregon	4:02.96	
4	Rich Peters	Boston University	4:03.49	
5	Will Geoghegan	Dartmouth	4:04.17	
6	John Gregorek Jr.	Columbia	4:04.49	
7	Sam Penzenstadler Australia	Loyola Chicago	4:04.77	
8	Jordan Williamsz Canada	Villanova	4:04.79	
9	Jeremy Rae	Notre Dame	4:05.07	
10	Matt Hillenbrand	Kentucky	4:08.01	

==== 3000 meters ====
- Final results shown, not prelims. Only top ten results shown

Rank	Name	University	Time	Notes
1st place, gold medalist(s)	Edward Cheserek	Oregon	8:11.59	
2nd place, silver medalist(s)	Kirubel Erassa	Oklahoma State	8:13.08	
3rd place, bronze medalist(s)	Ben Saarel	Colorado	8:13.45	
4	Jared Ward	BYU	8:13.73	
5	Trevor Dunbar	Oregon	8:14.13	
6	John Simons	Minnesota	8:14.40	
7	Erik Olson	Stanford	8:14.77	
8	Brian Shrader	Northern Arizona	8:14.84	
9	Reed Connor	Wisconsin	8:15.17	
10	Matthew Gillespie	Iona	8:15.38	

==== 5000 meters ====
- Final results shown, not prelims. Only top ten results shown

Rank	Name	University	Time	Notes
1st place, gold medalist(s)	Edward Cheserek	Oregon	13:46.67	
2nd place, silver medalist(s)	Lawi Lalang	Arizona	13:52.83	
3rd place, bronze medalist(s)	Parker Stinson	Oregon	13:54.46	
4	Jared Ward	BYU	13:54.93	
5	Joe Rosa	Stanford	13:55.84	
6	Luke Caldwell United Kingdom	New Mexico	13:56.66	
7	Patrick Tiernan Australia	Villanova	14:00.83	
8	Reed Connor	Wisconsin	14:09.20	
9	Adam Bitchell	New Mexico	14:10.36	
10	Morgan Pearson	Colorado	14:15.78	

==== Distance Medley Relay ====
- Leg 1 is 1200 meters, Leg 2 is 400 meters, Leg 3 is 800 meters, and Leg 4 is 1600 meters. Only top ten final results shown

Rank	School	Competitors	Time	Notes
1st place, gold medalist(s)	Stanford	Leg 1: Marco Bertolotti; Leg 2: Steven Solomon Australia; Leg 3: Luke Lefebure; Leg 4: Michael Atchoo	9:37.39	
2nd place, silver medalist(s)	Oregon	Leg 1: Brett Johnson; Leg 2: Marcus Chambers; Leg 3: Boru Guyota; Leg 4: Trevor Dunbar	9:40.47	
3rd place, bronze medalist(s)	Indiana	Leg 1: Jordan Gornall; Leg 2: Derrick Morgan; Leg 3: Tretez Kinnaird; Leg 4: Rorey Hunter	9:41.23	
4	Notre Dame	Leg 1: J.P. Malette; Leg 2: Patrick Feeney; Leg 3: Jacob Dumford; Leg 4: Nick Happe	9:41.90	
5	Columbia	Leg 1: Brendon Fish; Leg 2: Noah Lartigue; Leg 3: Harry McFann; Leg 4: Daniel Everett	9:42.48	
6	Virginia Tech	Leg 1: Leoule Degfae; Leg 2: Martin Dally; Leg 3: Tihut Degfae; Leg 4: Grant Pollock	9:42.82	
7	Arkansas	Leg 1: Cale Wallace; Leg 2: Eric Janise; Leg 3: Andrew Pisechko; Leg 4: Patrick Rono	9:43.19	
8	Washington	Leg 1: Blake Nelson; Leg 2: Quadelle Satterwhite; Leg 3: Derrick Daigre; Leg 4: Meron Simon	9:44.75	
9	Villanova	Leg 1: Dusty Solis; Leg 2: Samuel Ellison; Leg 3: Christopher Fitzsimons; Leg 4: Sam McEntee Australia	9:51.63	
10	Georgetown	Leg 1: Amos Bartelsmeyer; Leg 2: Devante Washington; Leg 3: Ryan Manahan; Leg 4: Ahmed Bile	9:57.85	

==== Heptathlon ====
- Final results shown, not prelims

Rank	Name	University	Marks	Points
1st place, gold medalist(s)				
2nd place, silver medalist(s)				
3rd place, bronze medalist(s)				
4				
5				
6				
7				
8				
9				
10				
11				
12				
13				
14				
15				
16				

==== Weight Throw ====
- Final results shown, not prelims

Rank	Name	University	Distance	Notes
1st place, gold medalist(s)				
2nd place, silver medalist(s)				
3rd place, bronze medalist(s)				
4				
5				
6				
7				
8				
9				
10				
11				
12				
13				
14				
15				
16				

==== Shot Put ====
- Final results shown, not prelims

Rank	Name	University	Distance	Notes
1st place, gold medalist(s)				
2nd place, silver medalist(s)				
3rd place, bronze medalist(s)				
4				
5				
6				
7				
8				
9				
10				
11				
12				
13				
14				
15				
16				

==== Long Jump ====
- Final results shown, not prelims

Rank	Name	University	Distance	Notes
1st place, gold medalist(s)				
2nd place, silver medalist(s)				
3rd place, bronze medalist(s)				
4				
5				
6				
7				
8				
9				
10				
11				
12				
13				
14				
15				
16				

==== Triple Jump ====
- Top eight results shown, not prelims

Rank	Name	University	Distance	Notes
1st place, gold medalist(s)	Felix Obi	Baylor Bears	16.59 m (54 ft 5 in)	
2nd place, silver medalist(s)	Mark Jackson	UTEP Miners	16.38 m (53 ft 8 3/4 in)	
3rd place, bronze medalist(s)	Jonathan Reid	Florida State Seminoles	16.28 m (53 ft 4 3/4 in)	
4	Ben Williams	Louisville Cardinals	16.22 m (53 ft 2 1/2 in)	
5	Anthony May	Arkansas Razorbacks	16.03 m (52 ft 7 in)	
6	Steve Waithe	Penn State Nittany Lions	15.81 m (51 ft 10 1/4 in)	
7	Jeremiah Green	Alabama Crimson Tide	15.81 m (51 ft 10 1/4 in)	
8	Cordairo Golden	Middle Tennessee Blue Raiders	15.80 m (51 ft 10 in)	

==== Pole Vault ====
- Final results shown, not prelims

Rank	Name	University	Height	Notes
1st place, gold medalist(s)				
2nd place, silver medalist(s)				
3rd place, bronze medalist(s)				
4				
5				
6				
7				
8				
9				
10				
11				
12				
13				
14				
15				
16				

==== High Jump ====
- Final results shown, not prelims

Rank	Name	University	Height	Notes
1st place, gold medalist(s)	James Harris	Florida State Seminoles	2.32 m	
2nd place, silver medalist(s)	Nick Ross	Arizona Wildcats	2.29 m	
3rd place, bronze medalist(s)	Marcus Jackson	Mississippi State Bulldogs	2.29 m	
4	Montez Blair	Cornell Big Red	2.23 m	
5	Bradley Adkins	Texas Tech Red Raiders	2.20 m	
5	Jacorian Duffield	Texas Tech Red Raiders	2.20 m	
7	Alexander Bowen Jr.	Alabama Crimson Tide	2.20 m	
8	Tanner Anderson	Duke Blue Devils	2.15 m	
9	Gemikal Prude	Lipscomb Bisons	2.15 m	
10	Anthony May	Arkansas Razorbacks	2.15 m	
10	Jon Hendershot	Penn State Nittany Lions	2.15 m	
10	Maalik Reynolds	Penn Quakers	2.15 m	
13	Cameron Ostrowski	Iowa State Cyclones	2.10 m	
14	Isaiah Harris	Saint Peter's Peacocks	2.10 m	
15	Mohamed Koita	Manhattan Jaspers	2.10 m	
	Andre Dorsey	Kennesaw State Owls	NH	

=== Women's events ===
==== w60 meters ====
- Final results shown, not prelims

Rank	Name	University	Time	Notes
1st place, gold medalist(s)	Remona Burchell Jamaica	Alabama	7.11	
2nd place, silver medalist(s)	Dezerea Bryant	Kentucky	7.12	
3rd place, bronze medalist(s)	Jasmine Todd	Oregon	7.16	
4	Morolake Akinosun	Texas	7.23	
5	Katie Wise	Indiana State	7.25	
6	Shayla Sanders	Florida	7.27	
7	Jenna Prandini	Oregon	7.32	
8	Jennifer Madu	Texas A&M	7.33	

==== w60 meters with hurdles ====
- Final results shown, not prelims

Rank	Name	University	Time	Notes
1st place, gold medalist(s)	Sharika Nelvis	Arkansas State	7.93	7.923
2nd place, silver medalist(s)	Tiffani McReynolds	Baylor	7.93	7.930
3rd place, bronze medalist(s)	Jasmin Stowers	LSU	7.94	7.937
4	Kendra Harrison	Kentucky	7.94	7.939
5	Janice Jackson	UTEP	8.05	
6	Cindy Ofili	California	8.07	
7	Jade Barber	Notre Dame	8.10	
8	Sasha Wallace	Oregon	DNF	

==== w200 meters ====
- Final results shown, not prelims

Rank	Name	University	Time	Notes
1st place, gold medalist(s)	Dezerea Bryant	Kentucky	22.69	
2nd place, silver medalist(s)	Kyra Jefferson	Florida	22.79	
3rd place, bronze medalist(s)	Mahagony Jones	Penn State	22.93	
4	Ashton Purvis	Texas A&M	23.11	
5	Destinee Gause	Florida	23.23	
6	Tynia Gaither Bahamas	USC	23.41	
7	Shayla Sanders	Florida	23.56	
8	Kamaria Brown	Texas A&M	DNF	

==== w400 meters ====
- Final results shown, not prelims

Rank	Name	University	Time	Notes
1st place, gold medalist(s)	Phyllis Francis	Oregon	50.46	
2nd place, silver medalist(s)	Ashley Spencer	Texas	51.71	
3rd place, bronze medalist(s)	Shamier Little	Texas A&M	51.96	
4	Courtney Okolo	Texas	51.97	
5	Kendall Baisden	Texas	52.01	
6	Kiah Seymour	Penn State	52.85	
7	CoCo Ndipagdor	USC	52.88	
8	Robin Reynolds	Florida	52.92	

==== w800 meters ====
- Final results shown, not prelims

Rank	Name	University	Time	Notes
1st place, gold medalist(s)	Laura Roesler	Oregon	2:03.85	
2nd place, silver medalist(s)	Savannah Kamacho	Oklahoma State	2:05.53	
3rd place, bronze medalist(s)	Kaela Edwards	Oklahoma State	2:05.72	
4	Andrea Keklak	Georgetown	2:06.42	
5	Amanda Smith	Virginia Tech	2:06.53	
6	Megan Krumpoch	Dartmouth	2:06.84	
7	Alena Brooks	Minnesota	2:08.31	
8	Nicky Akande	Villanova	2:11.60	

==== wMile ====
- Final results shown, not prelims

Rank	Name	University	Time	Notes
1st place, gold medalist(s)	Emily Lipari	Villanova	4:38.82	
2nd place, silver medalist(s)	Stephanie Brown	Arkansas	4:39.12	
3rd place, bronze medalist(s)	Shelby Houlihan	Arizona State	4:39.52	
4	Cory McGee	Florida	4:39.61	
5	Carly Hamilton	Georgia	4:40.18	
6	Colleen Quigley	FSU	4:40.39	
7	Leah O'Connor	Michigan State	4:40.86	
8	Monica Adler	Boston University	4:40.87	
9	Allison Peare	Kentucky	4:47.33	
10	Elizabeth Whelan Canada	UNC	4:56.71	

==== w3000 meters ====
- Final results shown, not prelims. Only top ten results shown

Rank	Name	University	Time	Notes
1st place, gold medalist(s)	Abbey D'Agostino	Dartmouth	9:14.47	
2nd place, silver medalist(s)	Dominique Scott South Africa	Arkansas	9:16.05	
3rd place, bronze medalist(s)	Elinor Kirk	UAB	9:17.00	
4	Emma Bates	Boise State	9:17.37	
5	Katrina Coogan	Georgetown	9:17.38	
6	Grace Heymsfield	Arkansas	9:17.83	
7	Aisling Cuffe	Stanford	9:17.87	
8	Rachel Johnson	Baylor	9:20.23	
9	Kate Avery United Kingdom	Iona	9:21.73	
10	Mara Olson	Butler	9:24.86	

==== w5000 meters ====
- Final results shown, not prelims. Only top ten results shown

Rank	Name	University	Time	Notes
1st place, gold medalist(s)	Abbey D'Agostino	Dartmouth	16:20.39	
2nd place, silver medalist(s)	Aisling Cuffe	Stanford	16:22.48	
3rd place, bronze medalist(s)	Kathy Kroeger	Stanford	16:23.34	
4	Emma Bates	Boise State	16:25.66	
5	Juliet Bottorff	Duke	16:26.53	
6	Emily Stites	William & Mary	16:27.99	
7	Shalaya Kipp	Colorado	16:32.03	
8	Emily Sisson	Providence	16:34.18	
9	Hannah Walker	FSU	16:35.01	
10	Elinor Kirk	UAB	16:36.12	

==== wDistance Medley Relay ====
- Leg 1 is 1200 meters, Leg 2 is 400 meters, Leg 3 is 800 meters, and Leg 4 is 1600 meters. Only top ten final results shown

Rank	School	Competitors	Time	Notes
1st place, gold medalist(s)	Arkansas	Leg 1: Grace Heymsfield; Leg 2: Chrishuna Williams; Leg 3: Stephanie Brown; Leg 4: Dominique Scott	11:05.83	
2nd place, silver medalist(s)	Stanford	Leg 1: Amy Weissenbach; Leg 2: Kristyn Williams; Leg 3: Claudia Saunders; Leg 4: Justine Fedronic France	11:08.28	
3rd place, bronze medalist(s)	Notre Dame	Leg 1: Alexa Aragon; Leg 2: Michelle Brown; Leg 3: Danielle Aragon; Leg 4: Kelly Curran	11:11.54	
4	Florida	Leg 1: Agata Strausa; Leg 2: Ebony Eutsey; Leg 3: Rebekah Greene; Leg 4: Cory McGee	11:12.12	
5	Michigan	Leg 1: Jaimie Phelan; Leg 2: Maya Long; Leg 3: Danielle Pfeifer; Leg 4: Brook Handler	11:14.60	
6	Oregon	Leg 1: Annie Leblanc Canada; Leg 2: Chizoba Okodogbe; Leg 3: Samantha Murphy; Leg 4: Megan Patrignelli	11:17.38	
7	Georgetown	Leg 1: Hannah Neczypor; Leg 2: Deseree King; Leg 3: Sabrina Southerland; Leg 4: Katrina Coogan	11:18.39	
8	Dartmouth	Leg 1: Elizabeth Markowitz; Leg 2: Jennifer Meech; Leg 3: Megan Krumpoch; Leg 4: Dana Giordano	11:18.60	
9	Villanova	Leg 1: Angel Piccirillo; Leg 2: Michaela Wilkins; Leg 3: Nicky Akande; Leg 4: Emily Lipari	11:20.40	
10	Duke	Leg 1: Anima Banks; Leg 2: Elizabeth Kerpon; Leg 3: Haley Meier; Leg 4: Audrey Huth	11:36.89	

==== Pentathlon ====
- Final results shown, not prelims

Rank	Name	University	Marks	Points
1st place, gold medalist(s)				
2nd place, silver medalist(s)				
3rd place, bronze medalist(s)				
4				
5				
6				
7				
8				
9				
10				
11				
12				
13				
14				
15				
16				

==== Weight Throw ====
- Final results shown, not prelims

Rank	Name	University	Distance	Notes
1st place, gold medalist(s)				
2nd place, silver medalist(s)				
3rd place, bronze medalist(s)				
4				
5				
6				
7				
8				
9				
10				
11				
12				
13				
14				
15				
16				

==== wShot Put ====
- Final results shown, not prelims

Rank	Name	University	Distance	Notes
1st place, gold medalist(s)				
2nd place, silver medalist(s)				
3rd place, bronze medalist(s)				
4				
5				
6				
7				
8				
9				
10				
11				
12				
13				
14				
15				
16				

==== wLong Jump ====
- Final results shown, not prelims

Rank	Name	University	Distance	Notes
1st place, gold medalist(s)				
2nd place, silver medalist(s)				
3rd place, bronze medalist(s)				
4				
5				
6				
7				
8				
9				
10				
11				
12				
13				
14				
15				
16				

==== wTriple Jump ====
- Final results shown, not prelims

Rank	Name	University	Distance	Notes
1st place, gold medalist(s)				
2nd place, silver medalist(s)				
3rd place, bronze medalist(s)				
4				
5				
6				
7				
8				
9				
10				
11				
12				
13				
14				
15				
16				

==== wPole Vault ====
- Final results shown, not prelims

Rank	Name	University	Height	Notes
1st place, gold medalist(s)				
2nd place, silver medalist(s)				
3rd place, bronze medalist(s)				
4				
5				
6				
7				
8				
9				
10				
11				
12				
13				
14				
15				
16				

==== wHigh Jump ====
- Final results shown, not prelims

Rank	Name	University	Height	Notes
1st place, gold medalist(s)				
2nd place, silver medalist(s)				
3rd place, bronze medalist(s)				
4				
5				
6				
7				
8				
9				
10				
11				
12				
13				
14				
15				
16				

== See also ==
- NCAA Men's Division I Indoor Track and Field Championships
- NCAA Women's Division I Indoor Track and Field Championships
