= 2017 USA Indoor Track and Field Championships =

Sports tournament

- Dates: March 3–5
- Host city: Albuquerque, New Mexico, United States
- Venue: Albuquerque Convention Center
- Level: Senior
- Type: Indoor
- Events: 30 (men: 15; women: 15)

The 2017 USA Indoor Track and Field Championships was held at the Albuquerque Convention Center in Albuquerque, New Mexico. Organized by USA Track and Field (USATF), the three-day competition took place from March 3 to March 5 and served as the national championships in track and field for the United States. All marks in the competition are considered at altitude.

== Medal summary ==
=== Men ===
Event	Gold		Silver		Bronze	
60 meters	Ronnie Baker	6.45	LeShon Collins	6.54	Desmond Lawrence	6.58
300 meters	Noah Lyles	31.87 CR	Paul Dedewo	31.92	Dontavius Wright	32.56
600 meters	Erik Sowinski	1:15.07 CR	Casimir Loxsom	1:15.18	Shaquille Walker	1:15.39
1000 meters	Clayton Murphy	2:18.60 CR	Brannon Kidder	2:19.10	Andrew Wheating	2:20.39
1 Mile	Ben Blankenship	3:59.22	Cristian Soratos	3:59.56	Garrett Heath	4:00.31
2 Mile	Paul Chelimo	8:28.53	Woody Kincaid	8:38.66	Ryan Hill	8:38.81
60 m hurdles	Aries Merritt	7.51	Aleec Harris	7.54	Jarret Eaton	7.59
2 mile racewalk	John Nunn	12:38.37	Nick Christie	13:11.81	Jonathan Hallman	13:29.00
High jump	Erik Kynard	2.30 m (7 ft 6 1/2 in)	Allex Austin	2.24 m (7 ft 4 in)	Deante Kemper	2.24 m (7 ft 4 in)
Pole vault	Sam Kendricks	5.85 m (19 ft 2 1/4 in)	Logan Cunningham	5.65 m (18 ft 6 1/4 in)	Chris Pillow	5.65 m (18 ft 6 1/4 in)
Long jump	La'Derrick Ward	7.93 m (26 ft 0 in)	Brendan Ames	7.74 m (25 ft 4 1/2 in)	Kendall Spencer	7.66 m (25 ft 1 1/2 in)
Triple jump	Chris Carter	17.10 m (56 ft 1 in)	Donald Scott	16.99 m (55 ft 8 3/4 in)	Joshua Honeycutt	16.91 m (55 ft 5 1/2 in)
Shot put (Note: Darien Moore originally won with a mark of 20.78 m, but he accepted an anti-doping sanction for metandienone metabolites in May for a sample he took during the championships, retroactively disqualifying him.)	Jon Jones	20.53 m (67 ft 4 1/4 in)	David Pless	20.31 m (66 ft 7 1/2 in)	Darrell Hill	20.16 m (66 ft 1 1/2 in)
Weight Throw	Alex Young	24.02 m (78 ft 9 1/2 in)	Colin Dunbar	23.74 m (77 ft 10 1/2 in)	Sean Donnelly	23.57 m (77 ft 3 3/4 in)
Heptathlon	Japheth Cato	5738	Austin Bahner	5640	Thomas Hopkins	5417
Masters 400 meters	Gabriel Fuzat	51.58	Khalid Mulazim	52.02	Brian Duff	52.70

=== Women ===
Event	Gold		Silver		Bronze	
60 meters	Morolake Akinosun	7.08	Dezerea Bryant	7.11	Lekeisha Lawson	7.15
300 meters	Phyllis Francis	36.15	Joanna Atkins	36.18	Candace Hill	36.56
600 meters	Ajeé Wilson	1:23.84 CR	Courtney Okolo	1:24.00	Kendra Chambers	1:25.46
1000 meters	Charlene Lipsey	2:37.97 CR	Lauren Johnson	2:38.33	Hannah Fields	2:40.18
1 Mile	Shelby Houlihan	4:45.18	Colleen Quigley	4:45.58	Heather Kampf	4:46.06
2 Mile	Shelby Houlihan	10:19.14	Heather Kampf	10:21.80	Sara Sutherland	10:22.49
60 m hurdles	Keni Harrison	7.81	Jasmin Stowers	7.82	Christina Manning	8.02
2 mile racewalk	Maria Michta-Coffey	13:55.27 CR	Miranda Melville	14:26.42	Katie Burnett	15:03.36
High jump	Vashti Cunningham	1.96 m (6 ft 5 in)	Inika McPherson	1.88 m (6 ft 2 in)	Maya Pressley	1.85 m (6 ft 3/4 in)
Pole vault	Sandi Morris	4.70 m (15 ft 5 in)	Katie Nageotte	4.65 m (15 ft 3 in)	Mary Saxer	4.65 m (15 ft 3 in)
Long jump	Erica Bougard	6.44 m (21 ft 1 1/2 in)	Jessie Gaines	6.42 m (21 ft 3/4 in)	Kenyattia Hackworth	6.38 m (20 ft 11 in)
Triple jump	Tori Franklin	13.86 m (45 ft 5 1/2 in)	Danylle Kurywchak	13.41 m (43 ft 11 3/4 in)	Blessing Ufodiama	13.33 m (43 ft 8 3/4 in)
Shot put	Michelle Carter	19.03 m (62 ft 5 in)	Brittany Smith	18.29 m (60 ft 0 in)	Felisha Johnson	18.23 m (59 ft 9 1/2 in)
Weight Throw	Gwen Berry	25.60 m (83 ft 11 3/4 in)	DeAnna Price	24.30 m (79 ft 8 1/2 in)	Felisha Johnson	24.22 m (79 ft 5 1/2 in)
Pentathlon	Erica Bougard	4558	Sharon Day-Monroe	4404	Sami Spenner	4211
Masters 1000 meters	Sonja Friend-Uhl	2:56.65	Lisa Valle	3:14.17	Terry Ballou	3:16.04
