= Eric Jenkins =

American distance runner

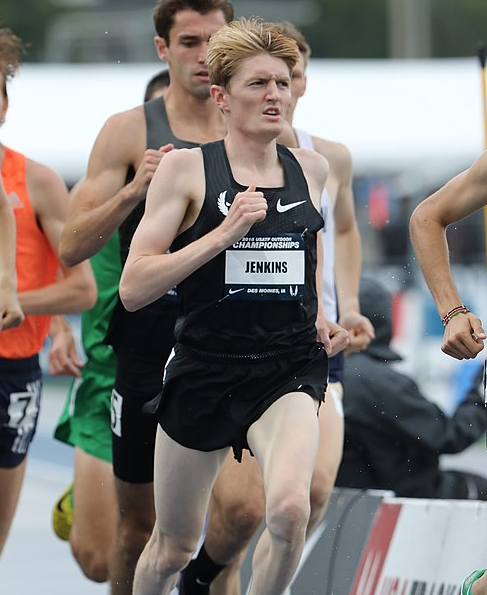
- Jenkins at the 2018 USA Outdoor Track and Field Championships

Personal information
- Nationality: American
- Born: November 24, 1991 (age 34) Portsmouth, New Hampshire, U.S.
- Height: 5 ft 9 in (175 cm)
- Weight: 141 lb (64 kg)

Sport
- Sport: Track, cross country running
- Event: 800–10,000 m
- College team: Northeastern; Oregon
- Club: Nike Oregon Project
- Turned pro: 2015
- Retired: 2023

Achievements and titles
- Personal bests: 1500 m: 3:35.94; 3000 m: 7:38.19; 5000 m: 13:05.85(i); 10,000 m: 27:22.06
- Updated on September 18, 2018

Eric Jenkins (born November 24, 1991) is an American retired long-distance runner. In college, he ran for Northeastern University, before transferring to the University of Oregon after his junior year. At the University of Oregon, Jenkins was a two-time NCAA Champion, with victories in the 3000 metres and 5000 metres at the 2015 NCAA Division I Indoor Track and Field Championships. He began competing professionally for Nike in 2015 as part of the Nike Oregon Project. Jenkins retired from competition in 2023.

== Early life and youth competition ==
Jenkins first ran competitively in cross country while in middle school. He then attended Portsmouth High School in New Hampshire, although he did not run all of the four years he attended. In his senior year of high school, he recorded a personal best of 4:15.10 in the 1600 metres.

== Collegiate competition ==
Jenkins enrolled in Northeastern University, where he made an immediate impact for the school's cross country team when he placed third overall at the 2011 CAA Cross Country Championships. In Jenkins' first semesters at Northeastern, the head coach was Renny Waldron, who noticed that he would start out too fast to finish strong in many of his freshman races. By Jenkins' junior year, Northeastern's cross country and track program went through widespread staff changes and new coaches were hired. Jenkins set Northeastern's indoor mile, 3000-meter, and 5000-meter records.

In the summer of 2013, Jenkins transferred to the University of Oregon. While a student and runner with Oregon, he won the men's 3K and 5K at the 2015 NCAA DI Indoor T&F Championships. During this time, a rivalry formed between him and his teammate Edward Cheserek, who would finish either closely behind or ahead of Jenkins in several races.

Eric is a two-time NCAA indoor champion; All-America honors every year in track and cross country; NCAA cross country runner-up, three NCAA track team titles, and the second-fastest 5,000 in NCAA history.) After graduating in June, Jenkins signed with Nike and headed to Europe, where he notched personal bests in the 3,000 meters (7:41.79) as well as in the 5,000 (13:07.33).

== Senior competition ==
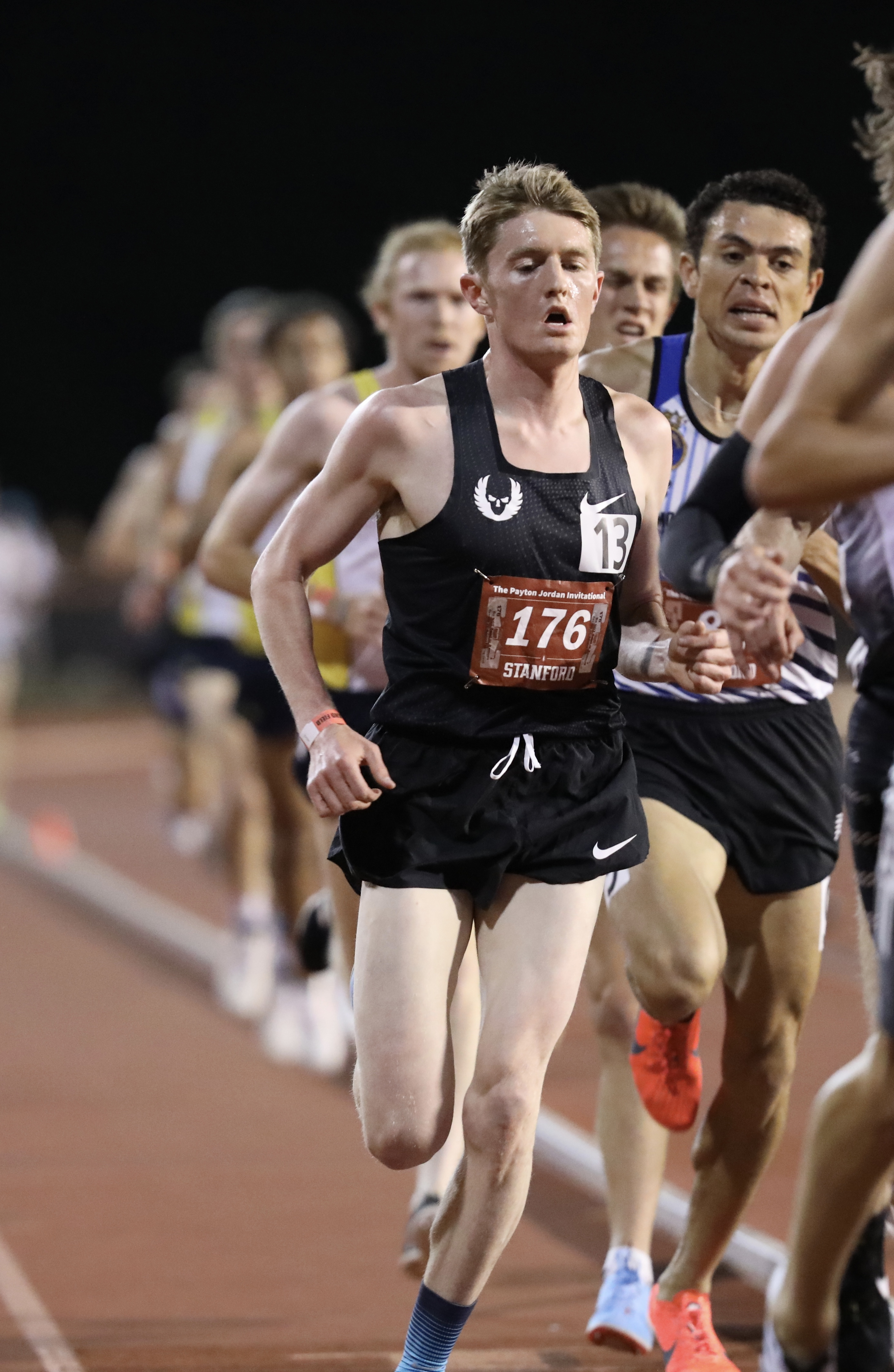
Jenkins competes in the 2019 Payton Jordan Invitational

During his first summer as a professional runner, Jenkins participated in two meets on the Belgian racing circuit. In Kortrijk, he ran the 1500 m, and in Heusden he ran the 5000 m, fulfilling the Olympic "A" standard in the process with his 13:07 result.

On February 5, 2016, Jenkins recorded a time of 3:42:32 over 1500 meters House of Track meeting in Portland. Two weeks later he ran a personal record over 3000 meters during the Millrose Games in New York, his time of 7:39:43 was good for 3rd place in the race that was won by Ryan Hill in 7:38:82.

On May 27, Jenkins competed in the 10,000 meters event at the Prefontaine Classic. He finished in 27:48.02 to achieve the 2016 Olympic qualifying standard. Later he placed fourth in the 5000 m at the U.S. Olympic Trials and failed to qualify. On September 3, 2016, Jenkins won the Fifth Avenue Mile in a time of 3:49.5, narrowly defeating the previous year's winner, Matt Centrowitz, by 0.1 seconds. On January 14, 2017, Jenkins won the Seattle UW Preview Mile in 3:58.68.

On February 11, 2017, Jenkins won the Millrose Games Wanamaker Mile with a time of 3:53.23, he defeated Olympic bronze medalist Clayton Murphy by over a second. This was Jenkins' first Wanamaker title. On February 26, Jenkins finished second at the Boston BU Last Chance Meet in 13:05.85. Jenkins’ effort was the top time in the United States in 2017.

On May 7, 2017, Jenkins won the Payton Jordan Invitational 1500m in 3:38.30, outdistancing top Americans such as Evan Jager, Izaic Yorks, and Brandon Kidder. On May 18, 2017, Jenkins won the Los Angeles USATF Distance Classic in 3:36.51.On June 11 Jenkins won the Portland Track Festival in 3:37.55. In doing so he beat out many talented domestic competitors, such as Sam Prakel, Lopez Lomong, Riley Masters, and Ryan Hill.

On June 23, Jenkins finished second in the USATF Championships 5000m final behind Paul Chelimo to qualify for the 2017 IAAF World Championships in Athletics. On July 22, 2017, Jenkins placed 6th at the Heusden-Zolder KBC Night of Athletics 1500m in Belgium in 3:37.92. Jenkins’ race result at the Heusden-Zolder KBC Night of Athletics ended a nearly ten month long undefeated streak at 1500m and Mile distance races, including a Wanamaker Mile and Fifth Avenue Mile title and wins against the reigning Olympic 1500m Champion Matthew Centrowitz and Olympic 800m bronze medalist Clayton Murphy. On August 9, 2017, Jenkins finished tenth in his heat of the 5000m at the 2017 IAAF World Championships.

Jenkins announced his retirement in 2023 after competing professionally for eight years. In an interview, he reflected on his retirement, stating: "I really gave it everything. It just felt like the right time. My body hasn’t held up to the training necessary to compete."

== Post-retirement career ==
Jenkins is a commentator at Citius Mag, where he hosts a podcast called "Off the Rails" with Aisha Praught-Leer.
