= Patrick Peterson (runner) =

American middle-distance runner

Personal information
- Born: August 26, 1992 (age 34) Gloversville, New York, U.S.

Sport
- Country: United States
- Events: 800 m, 1500 m
- College team: Sacred Heart University, Iowa State Cyclones
- Club: Atlanta Track Club

Achievements and titles
- Personal bests: 800 m: 1:45.82 1500 m: 3:39.18 1 Mile: 4:01.81

Patrick Peterson (born August 26, 1992) is an American former middle-distance runner who ran professionally for Atlanta Track Club and Mizuno. He ran collegiately for the Iowa State Cyclones, where he placed 3rd at the 2015 Big 12 Outdoor Track and Field Championships in the 800 meter. He was a member of Iowa State's third place distance medley relay team at the 2015 NCAA Division I Indoor Track and Field Championships, earning First-Team All-America honors and running an 800 m split of 1:46.52, the fastest in the race. He served as an assistant coach for the University of Connecticut track and field team.

== Collegiate ==
Peterson attended Sacred Heart University for the majority of his college career. At SHU, he was the New England Intercollegiate Amateur Athletic Association champion the 800 meter and the mile, and the 2013 Northeast Conference Indoor 800m champion. Peterson then transferred to Iowa State to compete in 2014 and 2015 for the Cyclones, where he earned All-Big 12 honors in the 800 meter and All-America honors in the DMR. Additionally, he has the eighth fastest 800 meter time in Iowa State history and he is a member of the fastest DMR team in Cyclone history.

== Professional ==
Peterson made his professional debut for New Balance and the Big Bear Track Club in California, highlighted by a 6th-place finish at 2016 USATF Indoor Track and Field Championships in the 800 meter. Peterson currently runs for the Atlanta Track Club Elite team coached by Andrew and Amy Begley. With a time of 7:11.84 at the Boston University Last Chance Meet in 2018, Peterson is a member of the second fastest indoor 4x800 team ever along with former Iowa State teammate Edward Kemboi. The team broke the former 4x800 indoor world record by 1.26 seconds, but lost to Hoka NJ/NY Track Club by 0.54 seconds.
