= Jenna Prandini =

American track and field athlete (born 1992)

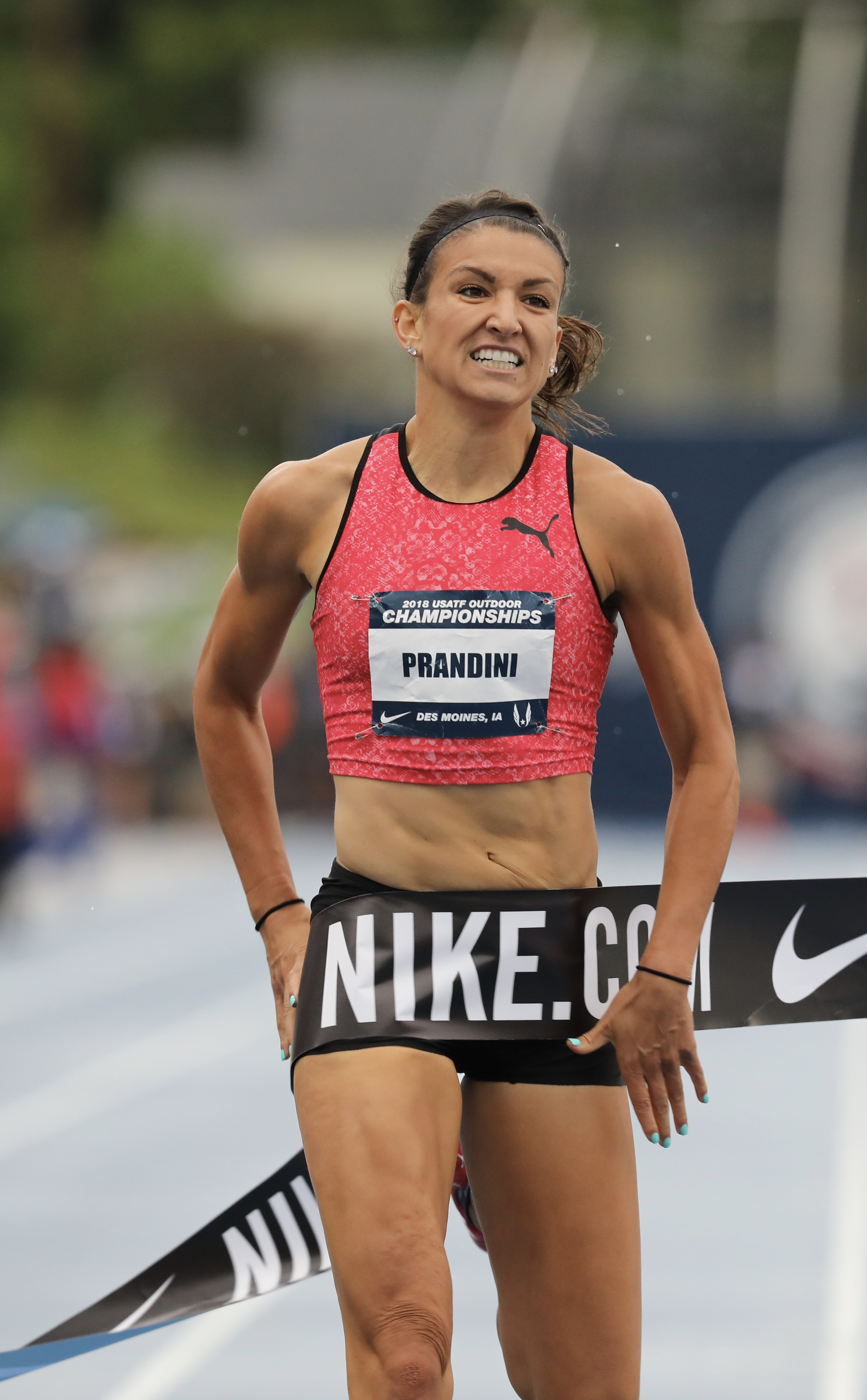
- Prandini in 2018

Personal information
- Nationality: United States
- Born: Jenna Elizabeth Prandini; November 20, 1992 (age 33) Fresno, California, U.S.
- Height: 5 ft 8 in (1.73 m)
- Weight: 132 lb (60 kg)

Sport
- Sport: Track & Field
- Events: Sprint, long jump
- Club: Puma
- Coached by: Edrick Floréal

Achievements and titles
- Personal bests: 100 m: 10.92 s (Eugene, Oregon 2015); 200 m: 21.89 s (Eugene, Oregon 2021); Long Jump: 6.80 m (Eugene, Oregon 2015)
Medal record
Women's athletics
Representing the United States
Olympic Games
Silver medal – second place	2020 Tokyo	4 × 100 m relay
World Championships
Gold medal – first place	2022 Eugene	4 × 100 m relay
Silver medal – second place	2015 Beijing	4 × 100 m relay
NACAC Championships
Gold medal – first place	2018 Toronto	100 m
Gold medal – first place	2018 Toronto	4 × 100 m relay
Representing Americas
Continental Cup
Gold medal – first place	2018 Ostrava	4 × 100 m
Bronze medal – third place	2018 Ostrava	100 m

Jenna Elizabeth Prandini (born November 20, 1992) is an American track and field athlete who has competed in both sprinting and long jump. She is a two-time national champion at 200 meters (2015, 2018), and a two-time Olympian in 2016 and 2020. She won a silver medal at the 2020 Summer Olympics as part of the United States 4 × 100 m relay team, and won a gold medal with the US 4 × 100 m relay at the 2022 World Athletics Championships.

== Professional ==
Before Prandini's 2015 national title, she won the 100 meters at the 2015 NCAA Division I Outdoor Track and Field Championships as a Senior at the University of Oregon. The previous year, she won the long jump. She also was a runner up in the 200 meters both years, runner up in the long jump in 2015 and finished third in the 100 meters in 2014. Prandini is the second female to win the NCAA 100 meters & USA National Outdoor 200 meters in the same year. In 2015, she won the Honda Sports Award as the nation's best female track and field competitor.

Prandini qualified for the 2016 Summer Olympics in the 200 meters by placing third at the 2016 Olympic Trials. At the 2016 Summer Olympics in Rio, she finished 10th in the 200 meters.

Prandini came to the University of Oregon with the same triple threat credentials, winning all three events (100 m, 200 m and long jump) at the 2011 CIF California State Meet for Clovis High School in Clovis, California. In her junior year, she won both the long jump and triple jump and also finished second in the 100 meters. In 2011, she also won the US Junior Championship in the long jump.

By coincidence, all of Prandini's major championships have essentially occurred at home. The CIF meet is held in Clovis at cross town Buchanan High School, the NCAA Championships and USA Outdoor Championships were at Hayward Field at the University of Oregon, though for the Junior Championships, also at Hayward Field, she moved to Oregon for school three months later.

In 2021, Prandini represented the United States in both the 100 m and 200 m at the 2020 Summer Olympics in Tokyo. She won a silver medal with Team USA in the 4 × 100 m relay by running the third leg.

== Statistics ==
=== Circuit performances ===
Grand Slam Track results
Slam	Race group	Event	Pl.	Time	Prize money
2025 Kingston Slam	Short sprints	100 m	2nd	11.23	US$50,000
2025 Kingston Slam	Short sprints	200 m	2nd	23.56	US$50,000
2025 Philadelphia Slam	Short sprints	200 m	6th	22.82	US$10,000
2025 Philadelphia Slam	Short sprints	100 m	8th	11.28	US$10,000

=== National titles ===
- USA Outdoor Track and Field Championships
  - 200-meter dash: 2018
- USA Outdoor Track and Field Championships
  - 200-meter dash: 2015
- NCAA Women's Division I Outdoor Track and Field Championships
  - Long jump: 2014
  - 100-meter dash: 2015
- NCAA Women's Division I Indoor Track and Field Championships
  - Long jump: 2015

=== Personal records ===
- 100-meter dash – 10.92 seconds (2015)
- 200-meter dash – 21.89 seconds (2021)
- Long jump – 6.80 m (22 ft 3 1/2 in) (2015)
- Triple jump – 12.73 m (41 ft 9 in) (2010)

=== Indoor personal records ===
- 60-meter dash indoor – 7.15 seconds (2015)
- 200-meter dash indoor – 22.52 seconds (2015)
- Long jump – 6.65 m (21 ft 9 3/4 in) (2015)

=== Major competitions ===
Championship	Event	Mark	Place	Date
California State High School Track and Field championship	LJ	19'2.75" w(1.1)	4th	May 31, 2008
California State High School Track and Field championship	TJ	39'9" w(1.1)	6th	June 4, 2009
California State High School Track and Field championship	LJ	20'5.75" w(3.2)	1st	June 4, 2010
California State High School Track and Field championship	TJ	42'7.25" w(2.2)	1st	June 4, 2010
California State High School Track and Field championship	100 m	11.42 w(2.0)	2nd	June 4, 2010
California State High School Track and Field championship	LJ	19'11.75" w(0)	1st	June 4, 2011
California State High School Track and Field championship	200 m	23.81 w(0.1)	1st	June 4, 2011
California State High School Track and Field championship	100 m	11.69 w(-0.3)	1st	June 4, 2011
USATF U20 Outdoor Championships	100 m	11.51 w(1.1)	5th	June 23, 2011
USATF U20 Outdoor Championships	200 m	23.75 w(0.9)	5th	June 23, 2011
USATF U20 Outdoor Championships	LJ	6.24m 20-5 ¾	1st	June 23, 2011
MPSF Indoor Track and Field Championships	60 m	7.34	2nd	February 23, 2013
NCAA Division I Indoor Championships	60 m	7.38	5th	Mar 9, 2013
Pac-12 Track & Field Championships	4 × 100 m	43.81	1st	May 12, 2013
Pac-12 Track & Field Championships	200 m	23.15	3rd	May 12, 2013
Pac-12 Track & Field Championships	100 m	11.46	1st	May 12, 2013
Pac-12 Track & Field Championships	LJ	6.15m 20' 2.25"	5th	May 12, 2013
NCAA Division I National Championships	4 × 100 m	43.80	4th	June 8, 2013
NCAA Division I National Championships	4 × 400 m	3:28.24	4th	June 8, 2013
NCAA Division I National Championships	100 m	11.43	7th	June 8, 2013
USATF national championship	100 m	11.90	25th	Jun 28, 2013
NCAA Division I Indoor Track & Field Championships	60 m	7.32	7th	March 15, 2014
Pac-12 Track & Field Championships	200 m	22.60	1st	May 18, 2014
Pac-12 Track & Field Championships	100 m	11.21	1st	May 18, 2014
Pac-12 Track & Field Championships	4 × 100 m	43.77	2nd	May 18, 2014
Pac-12 Track & Field Championships	LJ	6.38m 20' 11.25"	1st	May 18, 2014
NCAA Division I National Championships	200 m	22.63 (w)	2nd	June 14, 2014
NCAA Division I National Championships	LJ	6.55m 21' 6"	1st	June 14, 2014
NCAA Division I National Championships	100 m	11.42	3rd	June 14, 2014
MPSF Indoor Track and Field Championships	60 m	7.19	1st	February 28, 2015
NCAA Division I Indoor Track & Field Championships	60 m	7.24	4th	March 15, 2015
NCAA Division I Indoor Track & Field Championships	200 m	22.74	2nd	March 15, 2015
NCAA Division I Indoor Track & Field Championships	LJ	6.65m 21' 10"	1st	Mar 15, 2015
NCAA Division I National Championships	200 m	22.21	2nd	June 14, 2015
NCAA Division I National Championships	LJ	6.80 m 22' 3.75"	2nd	June 14, 2015
NCAA Division I National Championships	100 m	10.96 (w)	1st	June 14, 2015
USA championships	100 m	10.96	6th	June 28, 2015
USA championships	200 m	22.20 w(+0.4)	1st	June 28, 2015
World Championships	200 m	22.87	13th	August 27, 2015
World Championships	4 × 100 m	41.68	2nd	Aug 29, 2015
2016 Olympic Trials	100 m	10.96	5th	July 3, 2016
2016 Olympic Trials	200 m	22.53	3rd	July 10, 2016
2016 Summer Olympics	200 m	22.55	10th	August 16, 2016
2017 USA championships	100 m	11.35 w(-1.2)	13th	June 23, 2017
2017 USA championships	200 m	23.16 w(-2.5)	7th	June 25, 2017
2018 USA championships	100 m	10.98 w(+0.6)	3rd	June 22, 2018
2018 USA championships	200 m	22.62 w(-1.0)	1st	June 24, 2018
2020 Olympic Trials	100 m	11.11	4th	June 19, 2021
2020 Olympic Trials	200 m	21.89	2nd	June 26, 2021
2020 Summer Olympics	4 × 100 m	41.45	2nd	August 6, 2021
2020 Summer Olympics	200 m	22.57	12th	August 2, 2021

Awards
Preceded by Laura Roesler	The Bowerman (women's winner); 2015	Succeeded by Courtney Okolo
