= Cristian Soratos =

American middle-distance runner (born 1992)

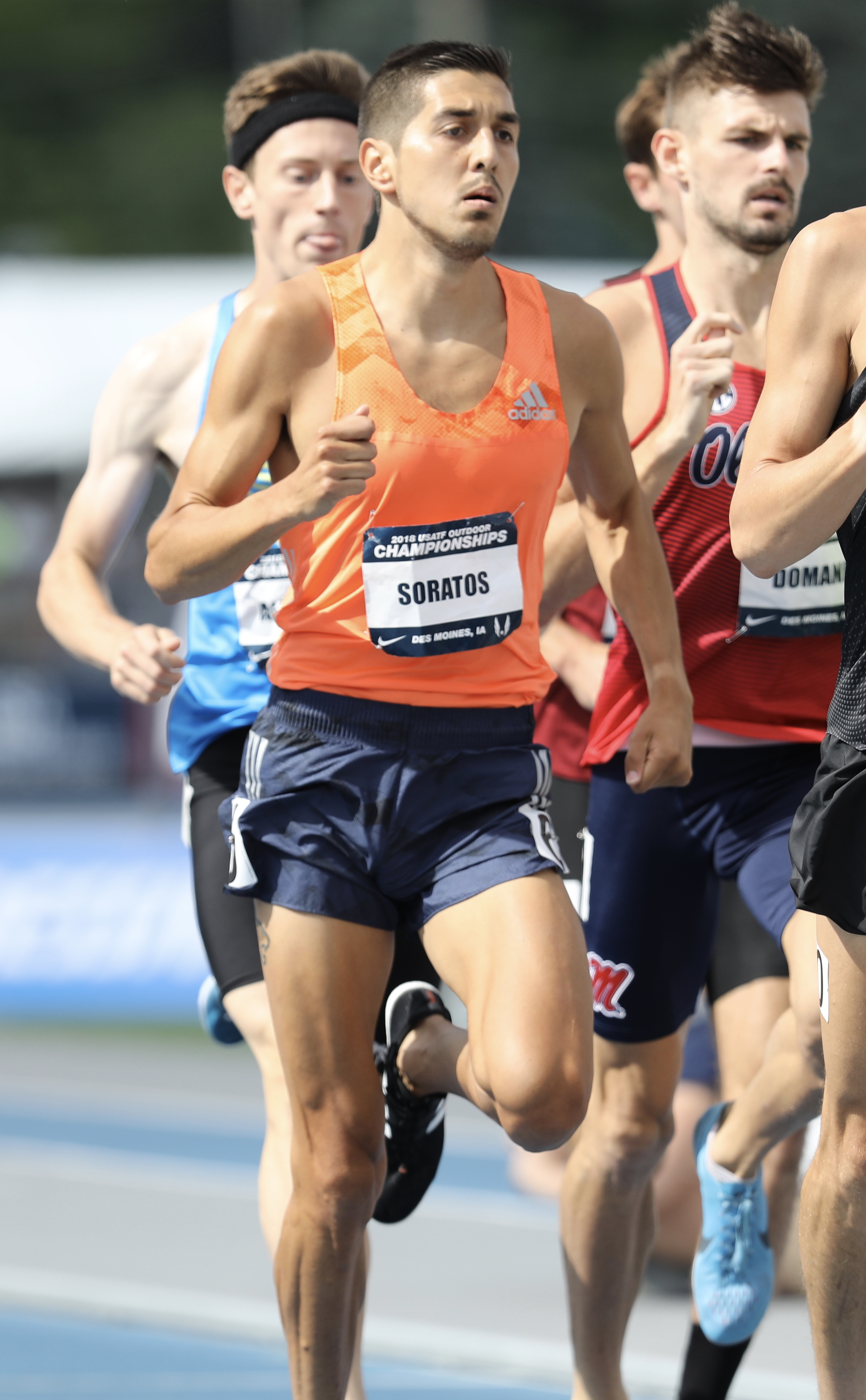
- Soratos at the 2018 USA Outdoor Track Championships

Personal information
- Nickname: "Buzzard"
- Born: September 26, 1992 (age 33) Salinas, California, U.S.

Sport
- Sport: Track, Ballin' on Twitch
- Events: 1500 meters, mile, 800 meters
- College team: Montana State, Hartnell College Panthers

Achievements and titles
- Personal bests: 1500m: 3:36.73; Mile: 3:54.23i^{1}
- Updated on February 3, 2018

Cristian Soratos (born September 26, 1992) is an American professional middle-distance runner. Born in Salinas, California, he first took up competitive running at Salinas High School. He then ran at Hartnell College where he eventually became All-State, after which he was recruited to Montana State University. After running several races at high altitude, Soratos ran his first sub-4 minute mile in 2015, and went on to emerge as one of the fastest collegiate runners in the United States. On June 25, 2015, he became a professional runner when he signed a contract to be sponsored by Adidas.

== Running career ==
=== High school ===
Soratos attended Salinas High School in Salinas, California. He was known to have been a runner of small stature. As a senior in high school, Soratos recorded a personal best 1600 meter time of 4:23.26. He was not subsequently recruited to a track program, and continued his post-high school running career voluntarily.

=== Collegiate ===
"My coach and I joke around when we see the trailers for the movie McFarland, USA and call it ‘Hartnell, USA’ because that’s what the culture was like...There was a heavy Hispanic presence there, and it was comfortable. I wanted to keep running."

— Cristian Soratos, March 2015

Soratos first attended Hartnell College, where he began training for cross country and track under coach Chris Zepeda. Soratos broke school records on the track. At Hartnell, Soratos pursued a high-mileage training program which at one point involved running 80 miles per week.

In his sophomore year at Hartnell, Soratos won four Coast Conference titles and recorded 3:47 at the 2012 California Community College Athletic Association state track and field championships in the 1500 meters, and subsequently transferred to Montana State University at the insisting of MSU coach Lyle Weese, who was once a standout MSU steeplechaser, professional runner, and Hartnell coach.

In one of MSU's home meets, on January 16, 2015, Soratos ran a 4:05 indoor mile, which the NCAA converted to a 3:56 result due to Bozeman's altitude of approximately 4,400 feet above sea level. It was the first race in which Soratos wore his Sonic the Hedgehog long socks, which attracted much attention in the sport.

Commentary from enthusiasts and experts alike was overwhelmingly skeptical of the NCAA-converted result. However, the following month, Soratos garnered national attention when he ran the indoor mile of at the 2015 University of Washington Huskey Classic, whose venue was much closer to sea level, with a time of 3:55.27.

The result automatically put Soratos in first place in the collegiate men's national leaderboard for the indoor mile, and also qualified him for the NCAA DI Indoor Track and Field Championships.

At the 2015 NCAA DI Indoor T&F Championships, Soratos placed second in an extraordinary indoor mile finals race behind Edward Cheserek, during which Soratos, after running the first three laps at approximately 64 seconds per 400 meters, exploded into the lead after the third lap with a 53.36 second 400-meter split in the middle of the mile race. Although Soratos finished behind Cheserek, the running website LetsRun.com called the race "a mid-race surge for the ages" in reference to Cristian's mid-race burst.

=== Professional ===
On the morning of June 25, 2015, Soratos signed with Adidas, and later in the same day ran in the men's 1500 meters of the 2015 USA Outdoor T&F Championships, where he finished 24th overall. On September 9, 2015, Soratos ran Hoka One One's Long Island Mile in New York in a time of 3:58.70, placing fourth overall. On June 2, 2016, Soratos raced at the Festival of Miles in St. Louis, finishing in third place with a time of 3:57.39.

On February 11, 2017, Soratos made a significant breakthrough when he finished in first place in the men's invitational mile at the 2017 Millrose Games. He finished in a new personal best time of 3:54.23.

On August 3, 2018, Soratos ran 3:59.16 for the men's mile at the loaded 2018 Sir Walter Miler, finishing in last place. All 13 men in the race ran under four minutes, with Lopez Lomong winning in 3:53.86.

Year	Competition	Venue	Position	Event	Notes
representing Adidas
2015	USA Outdoor Track and Field Championships	Eugene, Oregon	24th	1500 m	3:49.50
2016	USA Indoor Track and Field Championships	Portland, Oregon	7th	1500 m	3:48.33
2017	USA Indoor Track and Field Championships	Albuquerque, New Mexico	2nd	Mile	3:59.56
2017	USA Outdoor Track and Field Championships	Sacramento, California	5th	1500 m	3:44.49
2018	USA Outdoor Track and Field Championships	Des Moines, Iowa	8th	1500 m	3:44.12

== Notes ==
^1 The "i" next to a result indicates an indoor performance.
