= Erin Teschuk =

Canadian runner (born 1994)

Personal information
- Born: 25 October 1994 (age 31) Winnipeg, Manitoba, Canada
- Education: North Dakota State University
- Height: 1.63 m (5 ft 4 in)
- Weight: 52 kg (115 lb)

Sport
- Country: Canada
- Sport: Track and field
- Events: 1500 metres, 3000 metres steeplechase, 5000 metres
- College team: North Dakota State Bison

Achievements and titles
- Personal bests: Outdoor; 1500 m: 4:11.21 (New York City 2022); 3000 m steeplechase: 9:40.07 (Beijing 2015); 5000 m: 15:37.43 (Walnut 2023); Indoor; 1500 m: 4:13.51 (New York City 2023); Mile: 4:31.21 (New York City 2023); 3000 m: 8:46.46 (Boston 2023); 5000 m: 16:01.69 (Bloomington 2016)

Erin Teschuk (born 25 October 1994) is a Canadian middle- and long-distance runner. She represented her country at the 2015 World Championships in Beijing, the 2016 Summer Olympics in Rio, and the 2023 World Championships in Budapest. Collegiately, she competed for the North Dakota State Bison where she was a 15-time Summit League champion and 7-time All-American.

== Early and personal life ==
Teschuk grew up in Winnipeg and attended St. Mary's Academy from 2008 to 2012. Running for St. Mary's, she won three provincial cross country titles and won ten medals at the Manitoba High School Championships over the course of four years. She was also a multiple time medalist at the Legion National Youth Track and Field Championships.

Teschuk graduated from North Dakota State University with a BSc in 2016. She is currently enrolled as a graduate student at York University studying Psychology.

In August 2023, she was engaged to her longtime partner Charlie Grimshaw during a hike in Koppl, Austria.

== Collegiate career ==
=== 2012–13 ===
After redshirting her freshman cross-country season, Teschuk made her debut for NDSU running 3:06.76 over 1000 metres on 7 December 2012. She would go on to set indoor seasons bests of 2:13.86 in the 800 metres and 4:59.03 for the mile as well as anchoring the Bison to a Summit League DMR title.

Outdoors, she managed to run a personal best of 4:33.61 in the 1500 metres and finished runner-up at the Summit League Championships. Later that summer, she would make her debut in a new event, the 2000 metres steeplechase, where she would represent Manitoba at the Canada Summer Games in Sherbrooke, Quebec where she finished second to Geneviève Lalonde in a time of 6:45.40.

=== 2013–14 ===
Teschuk ran her first season of cross-country at NDSU in 2013 and finished 5th at the Summit League Championships and 93rd at the Midwest Regionals. At the Summit League indoor championships, she once again anchored the Bison to a DMR title and finished second in the mile individually.

Outdoors, she concentrated on the 3000 metres steeplechase where she ran a seasons best time of 10:23.75 at the Bryan Clay Invitational and won the Summit League title. She also qualified for the NCAA West Preliminary where she finished 7th in her heat, failing to advance to the National Championship.

=== 2014–15 ===
Teschuk had a breakthrough 2014 cross-country season which included 6 races over the course of 3 months. She began her season on 29 August with a win at the NDSU home meet, followed by a 5th place finish at the Stanford Invitational on 27 September, and a 1st place finish at the Ron Pynn Invitational on 18 October. In November, she won the Summit League Cross Country title and finished second at the Midwest Regional, making her the first NDSU runner to qualify for the NCAA Cross Country Championships. At nationals in Terre Haute, Indiana, she placed 116th, running the 6 kilometre course in a time of 21:18.1.

Teschuk's strong showings continued into the indoor season where she ran personal bests of 4:34.78 for the mile and 9:02.40 over 3000 metres, which qualified her for the 2015 NCAA Division I Indoor Track and Field Championships in both events. She also retained her Summit League indoor mile title and won the Summit League indoor 800 metres title in a personal best time of 2:10.21.

At the national meet, she finished 5th in the mile and 7th in the 3000 metres, earning All-American honours in both events.

At the Summit League Outdoor Track and Field Championships from 13 May to 15 May 2015, Teschuk claimed Summit League titles in the 1500 metres and the steeplechase. At the NCAA Championships she focused on the steeplechase where she finished 5th with a personal best of 9:42.15. A month later in Edmonton at the Canadian Championships she won her first Canadian steeplechase title. These performances qualified her to compete at the Pan American Games in Toronto and the World Championships in Beijing.

On 24 July, she made her national team debut at the Pan Am Games where she finished 4th in a time of 9:53.03. In August, she made her World Championship debut where she ran a 9:40.07 personal best but failed to make it to the finals, placing 10th in her heat.

=== 2015–16 ===
Entering the 2015 NCAA Cross Country Championships, Teschuk was undefeated having won all three of her previous races at the Stanford Invitational, the Summit League Championships, and the Midwest Regional. Entering the race, she was viewed as a potential podium contender. Despite this, she finished just 26th, still 88 places higher than the year prior and earning All-American status.

At the conference indoor meet, Teschuk won her third straight Summit League mile title and also took first in the 3000 metres. She would contest those same events at the 2016 NCAA Indoor Championships as well, placing 6th in the mile and 4th over 3000 metres.

Outdoors, she won her fourteenth and fifteenth Summit League titles winning both the 1500 metres and steeplechase. At NCAAs, she once again contested the steeplechase where she finished 8th. Just one week later she claimed her second Canadian title in Edmonton in a time of 9:50.99.

== Professional career ==
=== 2016–2018 ===
Shortly after her 3000 metres steeplechase victory at 2016 Canadian Championships, Teschuk turned professional signing with ASICS Furman Elite, based in Greenville, South Carolina forgoing her final season of cross country eligibility at NDSU.

Having met the Olympic Standard of 9:45.00 at the 2015 World Championships, Teschuk qualified for the 2016 Olympics in Rio de Janeiro. Just as in Beijing one year prior, she failed to qualify the finals, placing 16th in her heat.

In 2017, Teschuk ran a seasons best of 9:43.34 on 16 June in Portland. At the Canadian Championships in Ottawa later that year, she placed 4th, failing to qualify for the World Championships in London.

On 20 January 2018, Teschuk ran a 3000 m personal best of 9:01.30 in Nashville. She would run her steeplechase seasons best of 9:57.25 on 28 July 2018 in Ninove, Belgium.

=== 2019–present ===
In 2019, Teschuk joined VicCity Elite, a middle-distance training group based out of Victoria, British Columbia.

Teschuk finished just three races in 2020 due to the ongoing pandemic, but was able to run a 3000 metres personal best of 8:59.28 on 14 February at the Boston University Valentine Invitational.

On 8 May 2021, Teschuk ran her first steeplechase race in almost two years running a time of 10:16.80 at Griswold Stadium in Portland. 20 days later, once again at Griswold Stadium, she would improve upon her time by 20 seconds running a seasons best of 9:58.46, her first sub-10 minute clocking in almost 3 years.

2022 marked a shift in focus to the 1500 metres for Teschuk. On 20 May, she would run a 4:11.21 personal best at Icahn Stadium in New York City and finished 11th at the Canadian Championships in June. Later that summer, she would make her first national team appearance since the 2016 Olympics at the NACAC Championships where she would finish 5th over 1500 metres in 4:12.76.

Teschuk opened her 2023 indoor season with a mile personal best of 4:31.21, placing 5th at the Dr. Sander Invitational in New York City,

On 10 February 2023, Teschuk ran a time of 8:46.46 over the indoors 3000 metres in Boston, placing her 3rd on the all-time Canadian list. One week later, she competed in the Mixed Relay at the World Cross Country Championships in Bathurst, Australia. She competed alongside Canadian teammates Kate Current, Matthew Beaudet, and Perry Mackinnon. The foursome finished 8th out of 15 teams in a time of 24:55.

Outdoors, Teschuk ran a 5000 metres personal best of 15:37.43 at Mt. SAC and took first place at the Music City Track Carnival in the same event. On 27 July, she placed 7th over 5000 metres at the Canadian Championships.

Teschuk was selected for her first World Championship team in 8 years, being selected to compete in the 5000 metres at the 2023 World Athletics Championships in Budapest, Hungary. The selection was a "big surprise" to Teschuk herself who didn't believe she would make the team. In Budapest, Teschuk placed 18th in her heat, running a time of 15:56.54.

== Competition record ==
Year	Competition	Venue	Position	Event	Notes	
Representing North Dakota State Bison
Year	Summit League XC	NCAA XC	Summit League indoor	NCAA Indoor	Summit League Outdoor	NCAA Outdoor
2015-16	20:43.9 1st	20:18.3 26th	Mile 4:41.78 1st	Mile 4:38.94 6th	1500 m 4:25.96 1st	
2015-16			3000 m 9:08.79 1st	3000 m 9:08.45 4th	3000 SC 10:18.14 1st	3000 SC 9:56.71 8th
2014-15	21:17.4 1st	21:18.1 116th	Mile 4:41.28 1st	Mile 4:32.35 5th	1500 m 4:18.60 1st	
2014-15			800 m 2:10.21 1st	3000 m 9:07.92 7th	3000 SC 10:03.56 1st	3000 SC 9:42.15 5th
2014-15			DMR 12:03.54 1st			
2013-14	5th 21:53.3		Mile 4:52.38 2nd		1500 m 4:25.96 1st	
2013-14			3800 m DMR 11:20.65 1st		3000 SC 10:42.07 1st	3000 SC 10:24.98 40th
2013-14			5000 m 18:01.36 10th			
2012-13			DMR 12:11.82 1st		1500 m 4:39.65 2nd	
2012-13			800 m 2:20.99 4th		800 m 2:16.58 6th	

Year	Competition	Venue	Position	Event	Notes
Representing Canada
2015	Pan American Games	Toronto, Ontario, Canada	4th	3000 m s'chase	10:02.33
2015	World Championships	Beijing, China	25th (h)	3000 m s'chase	9:40.07
2016	Olympic Games	Rio de Janeiro, Brazil	46th (h)	3000 m s'chase	9:53.70
2022	NACAC Championships	Freeport, Bahamas	5th	1500 m	4:12.76
2023	World Cross Country Championships	Bathurst, Australia	8th	Mixed Relay	24:55
2023	World Championships	Budapest, Hungary	37th (h)	5000 m	15:56.54

== Personal bests ==
Outdoor

- 3000 metres steeplechase – 9:40.07 (Beijing 2015)
- 1500 metres - 4:11.21 (New York, NY 2022)
- One Mile - 4:36.20 (Vancouver 2019)
- 5000 metres - 15:37.43 (Walnut, CA 2023)

Indoor

- 1500 metres – 4:13.51 (New York, NY 2023)
- One mile – 4:31.21 (New York, NY 2023)
- 3000 metres – 8:46.46 (Boston, MA 2023)
- 5000 metres – 16:01.69 (Bloomington, IN 2015)
