= John Teeters =

American sprinter

John Teeters (born May 14, 1993) is an American sprinter. He is from Edmond, Oklahoma, United States where he ran for Edmond Memorial High School. Teeters ran for University of Tulsa and Oklahoma State University–Stillwater. He competed in the 2016 Olympic Trials, the NCAA Championships, and the Big 12 Championships. In the 2015 NCAA Division I Indoor Track and Field Championships he earned a silver in the 60m dash. He was also the sixth best in the world in 60m in 2015. In the 2016 Olympic trials preliminaries, he ran a personal best 10.00s 100 meters. He has also run a wind aided 9.91 (+4.2) for 100 meters. He now runs professionally for Under Armour.
