= Edward Kemboi =

Kenyan middle-distance runner

Personal information
- Born: December 9, 1993 (age 32) Eldoret, Kenya
- Height: 5 ft 8 in (1.73 m)
- Weight: 125 lb (57 kg)

Sport
- Country: Kenya
- Event(s): 800 m, 1500 m
- College team: Iowa State Cyclones
- Club: Atlanta Track Club
- Turned pro: 2015

Achievements and titles
- Personal best(s): 800 m: 1:44.77 1500 m: 3:39.02; Road 5 km: 15:17; 8K (xc): 23:44.50 10K (xc): 30:49.60

Edward Kemboi (born December 9, 1993) is a Kenyan middle-distance runner who competes professionally for Atlanta Track Club and Mizuno. He won the 800 metres at 2015 NCAA Division I Outdoor Track and Field Championships and at the 2015 NCAA Division I Indoor Track and Field Championships.

== Collegiate ==
In college, Kemboi competed for Iowa State University. He won seven Big 12 titles during his four years at the school.

== Professional ==
Kemboi represents Kenya in international competition. He competes for and trains with Atlanta Track Club where his coached by Amy and Andrew Begley. Fellow Iowa State Cyclone Patrick Peterson is also part of the team.
