= Desmond Lawrence =

American gridiron football player (born 1994)

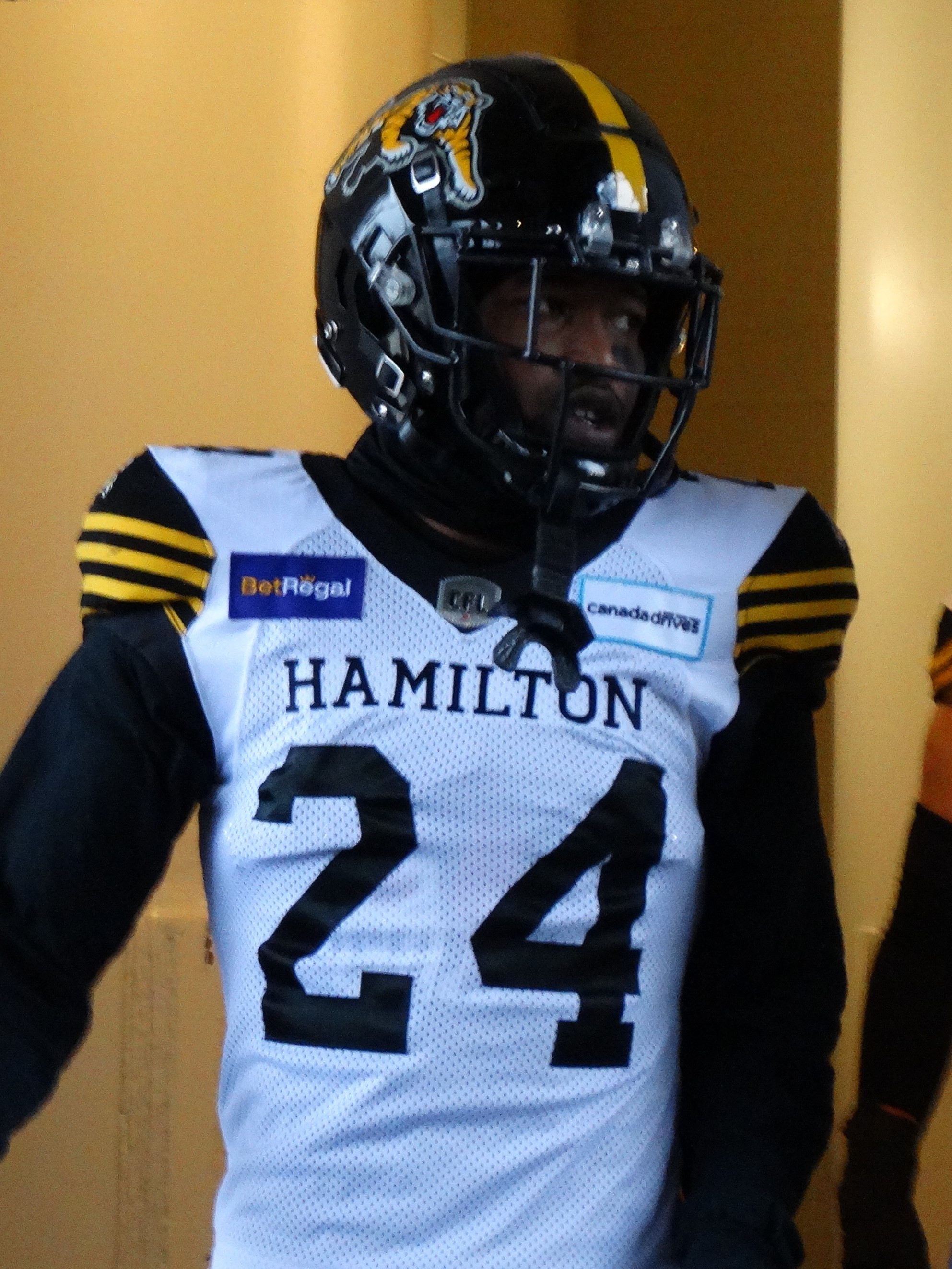
- Lawrence with the Hamilton Tiger-Cats in 2021

No. 23, 25, 24, 46, 22
- Position: Defensive back

Personal information
- Born: November 30, 1994 (age 31); Charlotte, North Carolina, U.S.
- Listed height: 6 ft 0 in (1.83 m)
- Listed weight: 185 lb (84 kg)

Career information
- High school: Charlotte Christian School (NC)
- College: North Carolina

Career history
- 2017–2018: Detroit Lions
- 2019: Atlanta Legends
- 2020: DC Defenders
- 2021–2022: Hamilton Tiger-Cats
- 2022–2023: Winnipeg Blue Bombers
- Stats at CFL.ca

Desmond Lawrence (born November 30, 1994) is an American former professional football defensive back.

== College career ==
Lawrence played college football for the North Carolina Tar Heels from 2013 to 2016. He played in 47 games where he had 178 total tackles, six tackles for a loss, 1.5 sacks, three interceptions, and one forced fumble.

== Professional career ==
=== Detroit Lions ===
Lawrence signed with the Detroit Lions as an undrafted free agent on May 12, 2017. However, he was injured during training camp and was moved to the reserve/injured list in 2018. He was released in the following off-season on April 6, 2018.

=== Atlanta Legends ===
Lawrence played for the Atlanta Legends in 2019, but the Alliance of American Football folded after the eighth game of play.

=== DC Defenders ===
In 2020, Lawrence played for the DC Defenders, but the XFL ceased operations mid-season due to the COVID-19 pandemic.

=== Hamilton Tiger-Cats ===
Lawrence signed with the Hamilton Tiger-Cats on February 17, 2021. He made the team following training camp and played in his first career professional game on August 5, 2021, against the Winnipeg Blue Bombers. He played in 10 regular season games where he had 22 defensive tackles, three special teams tackles, one sack, and two interceptions. At the end of the season, he was the team's nominee for the CFL's Most Outstanding Rookie Award.

In 2022 with the Tiger-Cats, he spent the majority of the year on the practice roster and played in just five games where he had four defensive tackles and two special teams tackles. He was released on October 1, 2022.

=== Winnipeg Blue Bombers ===
On October 5, 2022, it was announced that Lawrence had signed a practice roster agreement with the Winnipeg Blue Bombers. He was released on November 20, 2023.
