= Chad Noelle =

American middle-distance runner

Personal information
- Nationality: American
- Born: April 12, 1993 (age 33)
- Education: Oklahoma State University
- Height: 1.83 m (6 ft 0 in)
- Weight: 67.1 kg (148 lb)

Sport
- Sport: Track
- Events: 1500m, 800m

Achievements and titles
- Personal bests: 800 meters: 1:48.06; 1500 meters: 3:38.35

Chad Noelle (born April 12, 1993) is an American professional middle-distance runner. He was the NCAA Champion at 1500m at the 2015 NCAA Championship while competing for Oklahoma State University. He later competed at the 2016 U.S. Olympic Trials.

== Running career ==
=== High school ===
Noelle grew up in upstate New York and competed for Greene Central High School. He played soccer before focusing on track later in high school. He first drew attention in 2009 when ran 4:20.84 for 1600m as a sophomore at the New York State Championship. The following year, he worked with Robb Munro, a coach at a nearby high school, as his school did not have indoor track or a cross-country team. His first high school cross-country race as a Senior he won the Foot Locker Northeast Regional in 2010 and then placed 10th at the Foot Locker National Championships. He finished his high school career with 5 New York State titles, a 5 time All-American, winner of the 2011 Milrose Games Boys Mile and was named 2011 Gatorade New York Player of the Year. He set NYS Section 4 records in the 1600m (4:10.54), mile (4:09.02) and 3200m (8:56.02). He also ran 1:53.54 for the 800m.

=== College ===
Noelle was heavily recruited out of high school and elected to attend the University of Oregon. At Oregon he broke 4 minutes in the mile in 2013 running 3:59.57 at 19. Outdoors he was an All-American in the 1500m and ran 3:41.09. He also ran 1:49.33 at 800m while competing for Oregon. At the end of 2013 he transferred to Oklahoma State University.

Over the next 3 years at OSU Noelle improved dramatically. He became a 4 time Big 12 Champion, set the school records at 1000m (2:22.55) and the DMR (9:26.60), earned 4 more All-American honors, and helped the Cowboys to multiple Big 12 team titles. In 2015 during the indoor season he ran the mile in 3:57.78 at the Iowa State Classic. That season he anchored the Cowboys to a Big 12 title in the DMR and won the mile. He then placed 5th in the mile at the NCAA Indoor Track Championships. He followed that with an undefeated outdoor season, winning every final he ran in. At the Payton Jordan Invite he ran 3:38.35, which remained the #1 time in the NCAA that season. He later won the NCAA 1500m title, closing his last lap in under 51 seconds. In 2016 he ran 7:54.06 in the 3000m and competed in the 1500m at the 2016 U.S. Olympic Trials.

=== Professional ===
In 2016 after graduating from OSU Noelle signed a sponsorship with Asics. He now trains in Boulder, Colorado
