= Edward Cheserek =

Kenyan American distance runner

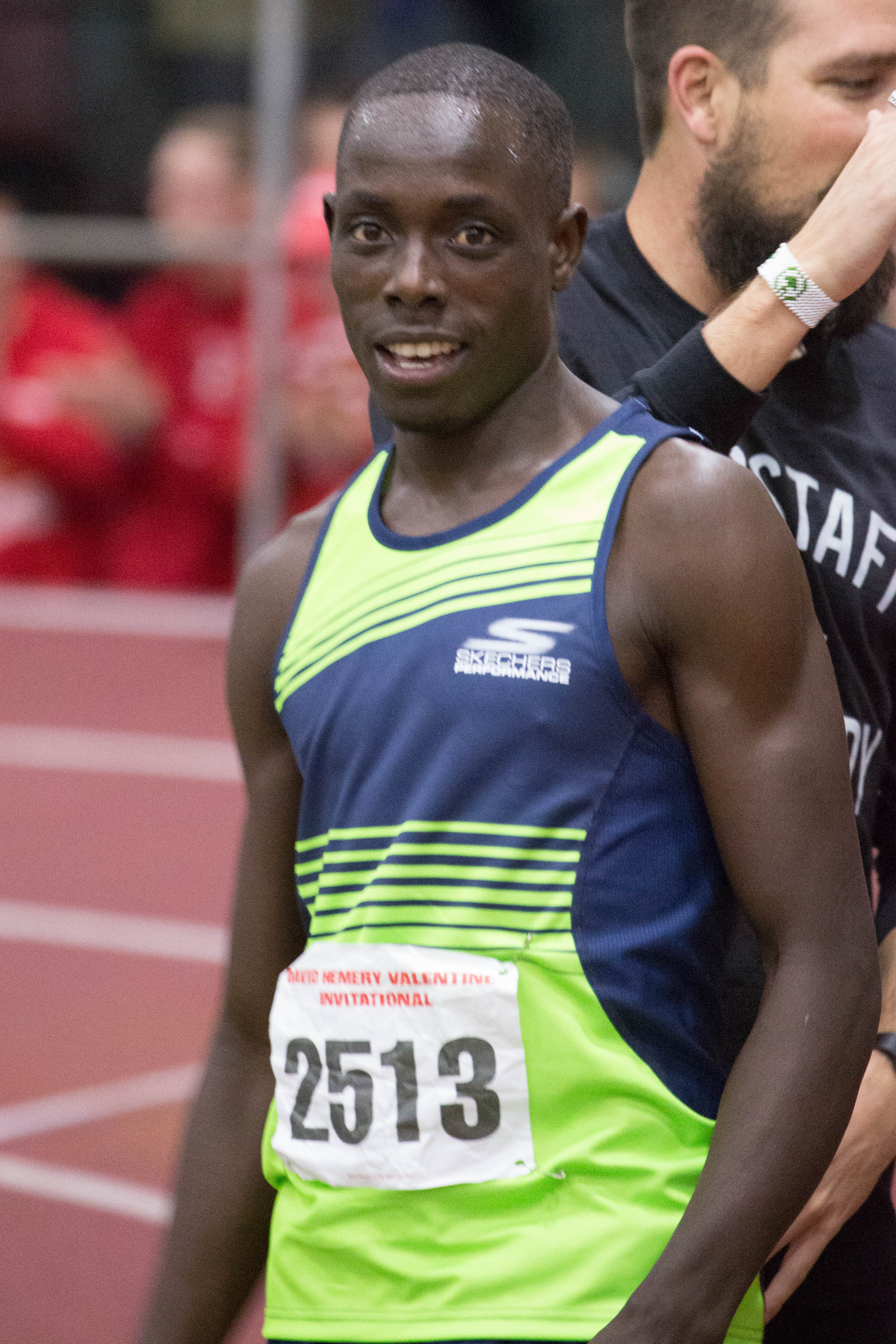
- Cheserek at the 2018 Boston University David Hemery Valentine Invitational

Personal information
- Nationality: Kenyan
- Born: 2 February 1994 (age 32)
- Height: 1.69 m (5 ft 7 in)

Sport
- Country: Kenya
- Sport: Athletics/Track, Long-distance running
- Event(s): 1500 meters, 5000 meters, 10,000 meters
- College team: Oregon Ducks
- Club: Skechers
- Turned pro: May 2017
- Coached by: Andy Powell (2013-2018); Stephen Haas (2019-2021) Andy Powell (2021 October - present)

Achievements and titles
- Personal bests: Outdoor ^{1}^{2}; 1500 m: 3:36.50 (Pullman 2014); Mile: 4:03.29 (New York 2011); 3000 m: 7:43.47 (Lucern 2019); 2-mile: 8:31.43 (Eugene 2018); 5000 m: 13:04.44 (Heusden 2019); 10,000 m: 27:42.69 (California 2020); Indoor; 1500 m: 3:33.76i+ (Boston 2018); Mile: 3:49.44i NR (Boston 2018); 3000 m: 7:38.74i (Boston 2018); 2-mile: 8:39.15i HSR (New York 2013); 5000 m: 13:08.05i (Boston 2019); Road; Mile: 3:53.3 (Honolulu 2019); 5 km: 13:29 (Carlsbad 2019); 10 km: 28:51+ (Falmouth 2019)
Medal record
Men's athletics
Representing Kenya

Edward Cheserek (born 2 February 1994) is a Kenyan distance runner. He is a 17-time NCAA champion collegiate distance runner for the University of Oregon. Cheserek was the most highly recruited high school distance runner in the nation out of Saint Benedict's Preparatory School in New Jersey where he was named the Gatorade 2012-2013 National Cross Country Runner of the Year. In 2013, Cheserek became the first freshman in Oregon history to win the NCAA National Cross Country Championships. Cheserek repeated this feat in his sophomore and junior years at Oregon before coming in third in the race in 2016 during his senior year. In total, Cheserek has 17 NCAA National Titles, including two indoor distance medley relays and one cross-country team title.

== Early life ==
Edward Cheserek was born on 2 February 1994 in Chepteran, Iten, Kenya to a family of ethnic Marakwet subsistence farmers. Cheserek is from the Marakwet tribe, which is a subgroup of the Kalenjin people. Edward Cheserek's father, Jacob, was a corporal in the Kenyan military, and is deceased. His mother, Dinah, is still living in Kenya. Cheserek is the fourth of seven siblings and is the only person in his family to have emigrated from Kenya at 14 years old. He was raised on a farm with no electricity or running water. Cheserek grew up in Kapker hamlet, Kapchebau village in the hills of northeastern Elgeyo-Marakwet County, western Kenya, where the altitude is close to two miles above sea level.

== Running career ==
=== High school ===
Edward Cheserek began running at age 14, after his father urged him to focus on running when his running ability was noticed on the soccer field. He joined athletic training camps in Iten when his father moved the family there. In 2009, Cheserek won the Kenyan junior national titles in the steeplechase, 5,000 metres, and 10,000 metres. The following year in 2010, the Nairobi-based missionary group Stadi za Maisha assisted him in obtaining a scholarship at Saint Benedict's Preparatory School in Newark, New Jersey, United States.

In the summer of 2010, Cheserek moved to the United States and began attending Saint Benedict's Preparatory School in Newark, New Jersey, later that fall. He has twice won the Foot Locker National High School Cross Country meet, first in 2011 and again in 2012, and was named the 2012-2013 Gatorade Cross Country Runner of the Year. In 2013, he set a new high school indoor 2 mile record of 8:39.25, replacing Gerry Lindgren's 49-year-old record of 8:40.00. During his senior year, Cheserek was the most highly recruited high school distance runner in the nation.

I have been lucky enough to have a good coach. To be good, to train good and want success, you need your coach to show you those things. I also want to be as good as what my coach wants me to be. That is what makes a difference with a runner. When you run and practice, you can do it for the coach. When you do it for the coach and yourself, you are at your best. You try harder and get better each day. I like being better each race. There is no reason to run if you don't.

=== Collegiate ===
Cheserek was recruited by the University of Oregon and in the fall of 2013 was the first freshman in Oregon history to win an NCAA National Cross Country Championship. As a freshman, Cheserek was the 2014 NCAA Indoor T&F champion in both the indoor 3000m and 5000m runs. Cheserek showcased his versatility at different distances by placing first in the indoor mile at the 2015 NCAA Division I Indoor Track and Field Championships.

At the 2014 NCAA Division I Outdoor Track & Field Championships in Eugene, Oregon, on June 11, Cheserek unleashed a final 400 meter sprint in 53.17 seconds to win the Men's 10,000m race with a time of 28:30.18, a personal best. He returned on June 13 to compete in the 5,000m race, dwindling the pack with a furious 56.84 final 400 meters, but it was not enough to out-kick Lawi Lalang of Arizona, as Cheserek placed 2nd in a personal best of 13:18.71 to Lalang's 13:18.36, which was an NCAA Meet Championship record. Cheserek's 18-points contributed significantly to the University of Oregon's Men's team title. After his phenomenal success on the collegiate scene, a 2015 The Wall Street Journal article described the 21-year-old Cheserek as the next great American distance runner. Cheserek hopes to become an American citizen.

During his college running career, Cheserek earned the nickname King Ches, a reference to his many winning streaks.

Oregon	Pac12 Cross Country	NCAA Cross Country	Indoor MPSF	NCAA Indoor	Outdoor Pac12	NCAA Outdoor
Freshman 13-14	8000: 24:36.0 1st	10,000: 29:41.0 1st	3000: 7:47.20 1st	3000: 8:11.59 1st 5000: 13:46.67 1st	1500: 3:36.50 1st	5000 13:18.71 2nd 10,000: 28:30.18 1st
Sophomore 14-15	8000: 23:22.1 1st	10,000: 30:19.4 1st	DMR: 9:27.02 1st	Mile: 3:57.94 1st 3000: 7:59.42 2nd DMR: 9:30.53 1st	5000: 13:45.25 1st	5000: 13:48.67 1st 10,000: 28:58.92 1st
Junior 15-16	8000: 23:06.3 1st	10,000: 28:45.8 1st		3000: 8:00.40 1st 5000: 13:47.89 1st DMR: 9:27.27 1st	10,000 28:58.57 1st	5,000 13:25.59 1st 10,000: 29:09.57 1st
Senior 16-17	8000: 23:58.9 1st	10,000: 29:48.0 3rd		5,000: 13:42.20 1st 3,000: 7:55.91 1st Mile: 4:05.42 2nd	10,000: 29:11.76 1st	

=== Professional career ===
In 2017 Cheserek turned professional, signing with Skechers Performance Team. At the 2018 Boston University David Hemery Valentine Invitational he ran the mile in 3:49.44, a personal best and at that time the 2nd fastest indoor mile in world history. In 2019, at the Carlsbad 5k road race, he tied the official IAAF world record with a 13:29 and his girlfriend for two years, Sharon Lokedi won the women's race in 15:48.

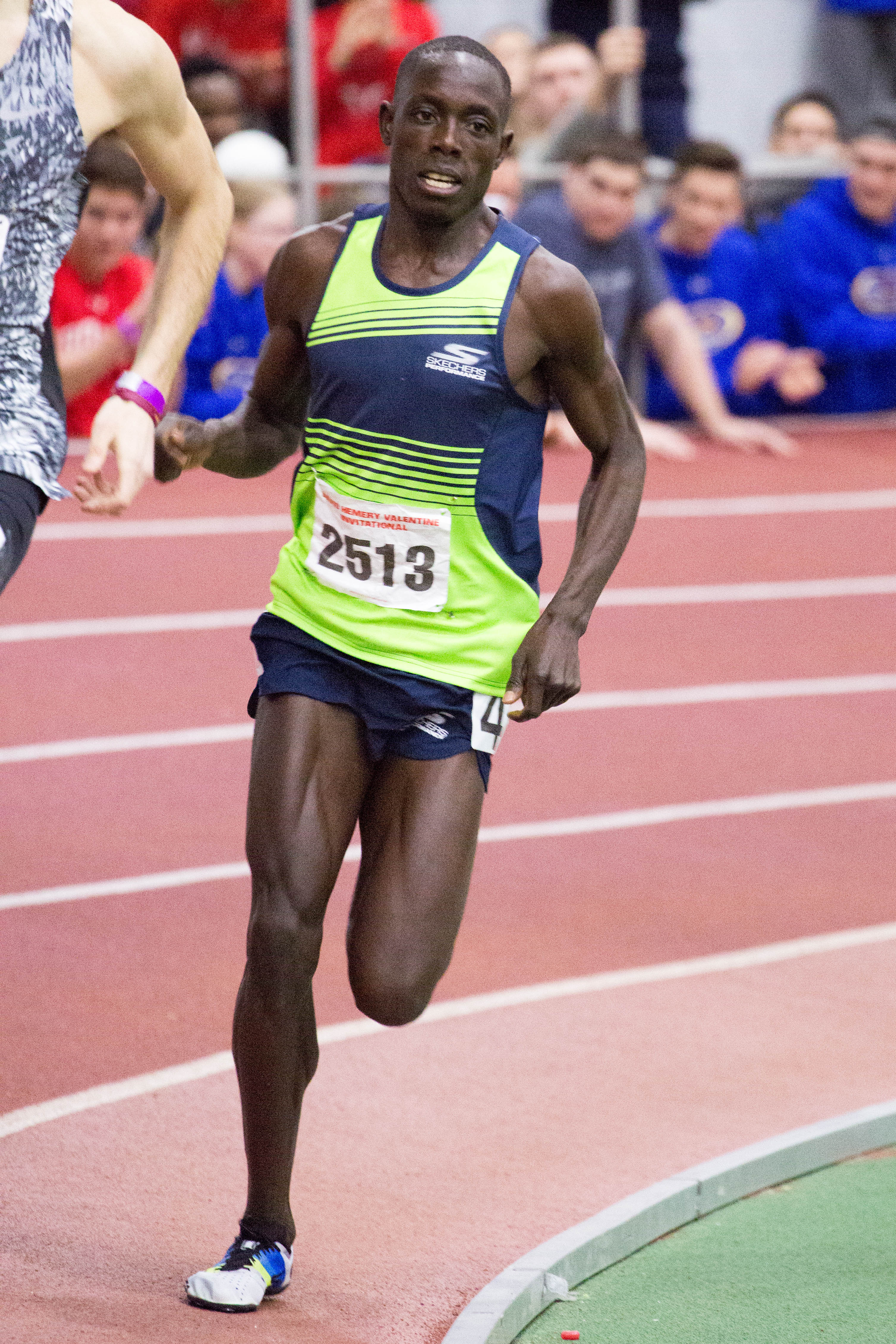
Edward Cheserek running the mile at the 2018 Boston University David Hemery Valentine Invitational in 3:49.44, a personal best and at that time the 2nd fastest indoor mile in world history.

== Competition record ==
Year	Competition	Venue	Position	Event	Notes
Representing Kenya
2011	Adidas Grand Prix	New York City, United States	4th	1 Mile	4:03.29
2012	Millrose Games	New York City, United States	8th	5000 m	13:57.04(i)
2014	Millrose Games	New York City, United States	8th	2 Mile	8:39.15(i)
2015	Millrose Games	New York City, United States	8th	Mile	3:56.43(i)
2016	Millrose Games	New York City, United States	6th	3000 m	7:40.51(i)
2018	BU David Hemery Valentine Invitational	Boston, Massachusetts, United States	1st	Mile	3:49.44(i)
2019	BU Last chance Invitational	Boston, MA, United States	1st	5000 m	13:08.05

== Personal records ==
=== High school ===
- 800 m: 1:49.98 (2012)
- 1000 m (indoor): 2:27.42 (2013)
- 1500 m (indoor): 3:45.20+ (2012)
- 1600 m: 4:09.90 (2012)
- Mile: 4:03.29 (2011)
- Mile (indoor): 4:02.21 (2012)
- 3000 m (indoor): 8:05.46+ (2013)
- 3200 m: 8:53.64 (2011)
- 2-mile: 8:55.12 (2012)
- 2-mile (indoor): 8:39.15 (2013)
- 5000 m: 14:02.33 (2011)
- 5000 m (indoor): 13:57.04 (2012)
- 10,000 m: 29:42.29 (2012)

=== College ===
- 1000 m (indoor): 2:19.02 (2013)
- Mile (indoor): 3:52.01 (2017)
- 1500 m: 3:36.50 (2014)
- 1600 m split in DMR: 3:52.88 (2016)
- 3000 m (indoor): 7:40.51 (2016)
- 5000m: 13:18.71 (2014)
- 10,000 m: 28:30.18 (2014)

=== Professional ===
- 1500 m (indoor): 3:33.76 (2018)
- Mile (indoor): 3:49.44 (2018)
- 3000 m (indoor): 7:38.74 (2018)
- 5000 m (indoor): 13:08.05 (2019)
- 5000 m (road): 13:29 (2019)
- 5000 m: 13:04.44 (2019)
- 10000 m: 27:23.58 (2020)
- 10000m (road): 28:25 (2021)
- Half Marathon:59:11 (2023)
- Marathon: 2:05:24 (2024)

== Notes ==
- ^1 The "i" next to a result indicates an indoor performance.
- ^2 Cheserek's 1500 meter personal best was 3:33.76 en route to his 3:49.44 mile. 3:36.50 is only his outdoor 1500 meter personal best, not en-route of a mile race.
