= 2017 NCAA Division I Indoor Track and Field Championships =

- Dates: March 10–11, 2017
- Host city: College Station, Texas; Texas A&M University
- Venue: Gilliam Indoor Track Stadium
- Events: 34

The 2017 NCAA Division I Indoor Track and Field Championships was the 53rd NCAA Men's Division I Indoor Track and Field Championships and the 36th NCAA Women's Division I Indoor Track and Field Championships, held at the Gilliam Indoor Track Stadium in College Station, Texas near the campus of the host school, the Texas A&M University. In total, thirty-four different men's and women's indoor track and field events were contested from March 10 to March 11, 2017.

== Results ==
=== Men's results ===
==== 60 meters ====
- Final results shown, not prelims

Rank	Name	University	Time	Team score
1st place, gold medalist(s)	Christian Coleman	Tennessee	6.45	10
2nd place, silver medalist(s)	Cameron Burrell	Houston	6.54	8
3rd place, bronze medalist(s)	Jaylen Bacon	Arkansas State	6.56	6
4	Senoj-Jay Givans Jamaica	Texas	6.59	5
5	Kendal Williams	Georgia	6.60	4
6	Kyree King	Oregon	6.63	3
7	Mario Burke Barbados	Houston	6.66	2
8	Kenzo Cotton	Arkansas	6.70	1

==== 200 meters ====
- Final results shown, not prelims

Rank	Name	University	Time	Team score
1st place, gold medalist(s)	Christian Coleman	Tennessee	20.11	10
2nd place, silver medalist(s)	Jereem Richards Trinidad and Tobago	Alabama	20.31	8
3rd place, bronze medalist(s)	Just'N Thymes	USC	20.36	6
4	Nethaneel Mitchell-Blake United Kingdom	LSU	20.63	5
5	Maxwell Willis	Baylor	20.69	4
6	Josh Washington	Arkansas	20.73	3
7	Kenzo Cotton	Arkansas	20.75	2
8	Ncincilili Titi South Africa	South Carolina	21.03	1

==== 400 meters ====
- Final results shown, not prelims

Rank	Name	University	Time	Team score
1st place, gold medalist(s)	Fred Kerley	Texas A&M	44.85	10
2nd place, silver medalist(s)	Michael Cherry	LSU	45.64	8
3rd place, bronze medalist(s)	Mylik Kerley	Texas A&M	45.75	6
4	Steven Gayle Jamaica	Alabama	46.02	5
5	Eric Futch	Florida	46.16	4
6	Eric Janise	Arkansas	46.33	3
7	Jermaine Griffith	Rutgers	47.10	2
	Kunle Fasasi	Florida	DQ	

==== 800 meters ====
- Final results shown, not prelims

Rank	Name	University	Time	Team score
1st place, gold medalist(s)	Emmanuel Korir Kenya	UTEP	1:47.48	10
2nd place, silver medalist(s)	Drew Piazza	Virginia Tech	1:47.62	8
3rd place, bronze medalist(s)	Joseph White	Georgetown	1:47.79	6
4	Isaiah Harris	Penn State	1:47.94	5
5	Robert Heppenstall	Wake Forest	1:47.98	4
6	Daniel Kuhn	Indiana	1:48.72	3
7	Blair Henderson	LSU	1:49.69	2
	Michael Saruni Kenya	UTEP	DQ	

==== Mile ====
- Final results shown, not prelims

Rank	Name	University	Time	Team score
1st place, gold medalist(s)	Josh Kerr United Kingdom	New Mexico	4:03.22	10
2nd place, silver medalist(s)	Edward Cheserek	Oregon	4:05.42	8
3rd place, bronze medalist(s)	Sampson Laari Ghana	Middle Tennessee	4:06.11	6
4	Neil Gourley United Kingdom	Virginia Tech	4:06.26	5
5	Adam Palamar	Syracuse	4:06.47	4
6	Joshua Thompson	Oklahoma State	4:06.96	3
7	Liam Dee	Iona	4:07.82	2
8	Ben Saarel	Colorado	4:07.84	1
9	Matthew Maton	Oregon	4:08.88	
10	Thomas Joyce	California	4:16.77	

==== 3000 meters ====
Rank	Name	University	Time	Team score
1st place, gold medalist(s)	Edward Cheserek	Oregon	7:55.91	10
2nd place, silver medalist(s)	Justyn Knight	Syracuse	7:56.21	8
3rd place, bronze medalist(s)	Marc Scott	Tulsa	7:57.19	6
4	Joe Klecker	Colorado	7:58.90	5
5	Colby Gilbert	Washington	7:59.41	4
6	Cole Rockhold	Colorado State	7:59.89	3
7	Brian Barraza	Houston	8:00.69	2
8	John Dressel	Colorado	8:01.93	1
9	Clayton Young	BYU	8:02.11	
10	Scott Carpenter	Georgetown	8:06.34	
11	Jack Keelan	Stanford	8:10.03	
12	Amon Terer	Campbell	8:12.28	
13	Erik Peterson	Butler	8:16.46	
14	Garrett Corcoran	California	8:20.31	
15	Ben Saarel	Colorado	8:21.01	
16	Matthew Maton	Oregon	8:21.45	

==== 5000 meters ====
Rank	Name	University	Time	Team score
1st place, gold medalist(s)	Edward Cheserek	Oregon	13:41.20	10
2nd place, silver medalist(s)	Marc Scott	Tulsa	13:43.83	8
3rd place, bronze medalist(s)	Amon Terer	Campbell	13:47.01	6
4	John Dressel	Colorado	13:47.84	5
5	Alfred Chelanga	Alabama	13:48.36	4
6	Erik Peterson	Butler	13:49.83	3
7	MJ Erb	Ole Miss	13:51.73	2
8	Tyler Day	Northern Arizona	13:53.93	1
9	Grant Fischer	Colorado State	13:55.37	
10	Jerrell Mock	Colorado State	13:56.74	
11	Rory Linkletter	BYU	13:57.62	
12	Zach Herriott	Virginia	13:59.99	
13	Jonathan Green	Georgetown	14:00.95	
14	Matthew Baxter	Northern Arizona	14:08.28	
15	Colby Gilbert	Washington	14:20.58	
16	Alex Short	San Francisco	14:23.26	

==== 60 meters hurdles ====
- Final results shown, not prelims

Rank	Name	University	Time	Team score
1st place, gold medalist(s)	Grant Holloway	Florida	7.58	10
2nd place, silver medalist(s)	Freddie Crittenden III	Syracuse	7.67	8
3rd place, bronze medalist(s)	Chad Zallow	Youngstown State	7.72	6
4	David Kendziera	Illinois	7.73	5
5	Ruebin Walters	Alabama	7.77	4
6	Ashtyn Davis	California	7.83	3
7	Nick Anderson	Kentucky	7.85	2
8	Aaron Mallett	Iowa	9.49	1

==== 4 × 400 meters relay ====
Rank	University	Athletes	Time	Team score
1st place, gold medalist(s)	Texas A&M	Fred Kerley, Robert Grant, Devin Dixon, Mylik Kerley	3:02.80	10
2nd place, silver medalist(s)	Florida	Kunle Fasasi, Grant Holloway, Eric Futch, Ryan Clark	3:03.52	8
3rd place, bronze medalist(s)	Arkansas	Kemar Mowatt, Obi Igbokwe, Eric Janise, Jamarco Stephen	3:05.34	6
4	LSU	Michael Cherry, Jaron Flournoy, Nethaneel Mitchell-Blake, Lamar Bruton	3:05.53	5
5	Iowa	Emmanuel Ogwo, Collin Hofacker, DeJuan Frye, Mar'yea Harris	3:05.60	4
6	Texas Tech	Kyle Collins, Andrew Hudson, Steven Champlin, Charles Jones	3:05.63	3
7	Texas	Byron Robinson, Senoj-Jay Givans, Christopher Irvin, Aldrich Bailey Jr.	3:05.88	2
8	Alabama	Skyler Bowden, Steven Gayle, Jacopo Lahbi, Jereem Richards	3:06.06	1
9	USC	Ricky Morgan Jr., Just'N Thymes, Zyaire Clemes, Marquis Morris	3:06.08	
10	Penn State	Dan Chisena, Xavier Smith, Samuel Reiser, Isaiah Harris	3:07.43	
11	Kansas	Ivan Henry, Tre Daniels, Jaron Hartley, Strymar Livingston	3:07.87	
	Iowa State	Eric Fogltanz, Ben Kelly, Roshon Roomes, Jaymes Dennison	DNF	

==== Distance medley relay ====
Rank	University	Athletes	Time	Team score
1st place, gold medalist(s)	Ole Miss	Craig Engels, Nick DeRay, Sean Tobin, Robert Domanic	9:31.32	10
2nd place, silver medalist(s)	Virginia Tech	Daniel Jaskowak, Gregory Chiles, Kevin Cianfarini, Vincent Ciattei	9:33.35	8
3rd place, bronze medalist(s)	Georgetown	Darren Fahy, Quincey Wilson, Spencer Brown, Scott Carpenter	9:33.42	6
4	Oregon	Austin Tamagno, Marcus Chambers, Mick Stanovsek, Blake Haney	9:33.52	5
5	Indiana	Joseph Murphy, Markevious Roach, Daniel Kuhn, Kyle Mau	9:34.17	4
6	Oklahoma State	Craig Nowak, Brandon Singleton, Bradley Johnson, Hassan Abdi	9:35.02	3
7	Arkansas	Ethan Moehn, Jamarco Stephen, Carlton Orange, Jack Bruce	9:38.91	2
8	Villanova	Elliot Slade, Harry Purcell, Ville Lampinen, Logan Wetzel	9:39.38	1
9	Minnesota	Shane Streich, Jack Wellenstein, Mitch Hechsel, Derek Wiebke	9:41.11	
10	New Mexico	Elmar Engholm, Mark Haywood, Kristian Hansen, Graham Thomas	9:46.87	
11	UTEP	Jonah Koech, Asa Guevara, Cosmas Boit, Michael Saruni	9:56.03	
12	Stanford	Tai Dinger, Jackson Shumway, Brian Smith, Jack Keelan	10:00.77	

==== High jump ====
Rank	Name	University	2.10	2.15	2.20	2.23	2.26	2.29	Mark	Team score
1st place, gold medalist(s)	Trey Culver	Texas Tech	o	o	xo	o	o	xxx	2.26	10
2nd place, silver medalist(s)	Kyle Landon	Southern Illinois	o	o	o	o	xo	xxx	2.26	8
3rd place, bronze medalist(s)	Keenon Laine	Georgia	o	o	o	xo	xxx		2.23	6
4	Randall Cunningham II	USC	o	o	o	xxo	xxx		2.23	5
5=	Christoff Bryan	Kansas State	o	o	xo	xxx			2.20	3.5
5=	Clayton Brown	Florida	o	o	xo	xxx			2.20	3.5
7=	Justice Summerset	Arizona	o	xo	xo	xxx			2.20	1.5
7=	Darius Carbin	Georgia	xo	o	xo	xxx			2.20	1.5
9	Ken LeGassey	Arkansas	o	o	xxx				2.15	
10	Zachary Blackham	BYU	o	xo	xxx				2.15	
11	Matthew Campbell	Albany	xo	xo	xxx				2.15	
12=	Darryl Sullivan	Tennessee	o	xxx					2.10	
12=	Michael Burke	UCLA	o	xxx					2.10	
12=	Julian Harvey	SIU Edwardsville	o	xxx					2.10	
15	Damar Robinson	Louisville	xo	xxx					2.10	
16	Charles Brown	Texas Tech	xxo	xxx					2.10	

==== Pole vault ====
Rank	Name	University	5.25	5.35	5.45	5.50	5.55	5.60	5.65	5.70	5.81	Mark	Team score
1st place, gold medalist(s)	Chris Nilsen	South Dakota	o	o	xo	o	–	xo	–	xxo	xxx	5.70	10
2nd place, silver medalist(s)	Audie Wyatt	Texas A&M	xo	o	o	o	o	xr				5.55	8
3rd place, bronze medalist(s)	Matthew Ludwig	Akron	o	o	xo	xxo	xxx					5.50	6
4	Tim Ehrhardt	Michigan State	o	o	xxo	xxo	xxx					5.50	5
5	Adrián Vallés	Cincinnati	o	–	o	xxr						5.45	4
6	Torben Laidig	Virginia Tech	xo	o	o	xxx						5.45	2.5
6	Nate Richartz	Notre Dame	o	xo	o	xxx						5.45	2.5
8	Tray Oates	Samford	xxo	xo	o	–	xxx					5.45	1
9	Devin King	Southeastern Louisiana	o	o	xo	xxx						5.45	
10	Deakin Volz	Virginia Tech	xo	xo	xo	xxx						5.45	
11	Chase Smith	Washington	o	xo	xxx							5.35	
11	Jake Albright	Kansas	o	xo	xxx							5.35	
13	Kyle Pater	Air Force	xo	xxo	xxx							5.35	
14	Nick Maestretti	Kansas	o	xxx								5.25	
15	Paulo Benavides	Kansas	xo	xxx								5.25	
	Barrett Poth	Texas	xxx									NH	

==== Long jump ====
Rank	Name	University	Round						Mark	Team score
Rank	Name	University	1	2	3	4	5	6	Mark	Team score
1st place, gold medalist(s)	KeAndre Bates	Florida	7.24	8.04	7.60	7.66	7.90	8.00	8.04	10
2nd place, silver medalist(s)	Will Williams	Texas A&M	x	7.82	7.86	x	7.47	7.89	7.89	8
3rd place, bronze medalist(s)	Steffin McCarter	Texas	7.78	7.66	7.59	7.71	7.73	7.83	7.83	6
4	Andreas Trajkovski	Arkansas	7.76	7.61	7.67	x	7.83	7.71	7.83	5
5	Julian Harvey	SIU Edwardsville	7.78	7.55	7.49	7.53	7.81	7.71	7.81	4
6	Terrell McClain	Akron	7.81	7.66	7.53	7.72	7.75	7.69	7.81	3
7	Damarcus Simpson	Oregon	x	7.71	x	7.76	x	7.62	7.76	2
8	Travonn White	Arkansas	x	7.68	7.21	7.74	x	7.47	7.74	1
9	Chris McBride	Clemson	7.53	7.48	7.60	7.63	7.48	7.40	7.63	
10	Jacob Fincham-Dukes	Oklahoma State	7.59	x	7.54				7.59	
11	Grant Holloway	Florida	7.16	7.57	7.57				7.57	
12	Austin Hazel	UCLA	7.47	7.50	7.55				7.55	
13	Ventavius Sears	Western Kentucky	7.55	x	7.21				7.55	
14	Charles Brown	Texas Tech	x	7.48	x				7.48	
15	O'Shea Wilson	Iowa	x	5.80	7.33				7.33	
	Hunter Veith	Wichita State	x	-	-				NM	

==== Triple jump ====
Rank	Name	University	Round						Mark	Team score
Rank	Name	University	1	2	3	4	5	6	Mark	Team score
1st place, gold medalist(s)	Clive Pullen	Arkansas	16.82	16.56	16.70	x	x	16.86	16.86	10
2nd place, silver medalist(s)	KeAndre Bates	Florida	16.12	16.62	16.28	16.31	16.54	16.12	16.62	8
3rd place, bronze medalist(s)	O'Brien Wasome	Texas	x	16.49	x	-	x	16.24	16.49	6
4	Hayden McClain	Oklahoma	15.17	15.55	16.10	x	16.03	16.16	16.16	5
5	Barden Adams	Kansas	x	15.99	15.34	15.62	15.25	15.75	15.99	4
6	Kaiwan Culmer	Nebraska	15.51	15.53	15.75	15.19	15.43	15.96	15.96	3
7	Clayton Brown	Florida	15.84	15.55	15.64	x	15.87	15.92	15.92	2
8	Montel Nevers	Florida State	x	15.36	15.90	15.59	x	15.63	15.90	1
9	David Oluwadara	Boston University	15.69	15.73	15.58	15.88	15.34	15.32	15.88	
10	Jordan Scott	Virginia	x	15.53	15.69				15.69	
11	Damar Robinson	Louisville	13.99	15.21	15.63				15.63	
12	Scotty Newton	TCU	15.51	x	x				15.51	
13	Charles Brown	Texas Tech	15.15	x	15.42				15.42	
14	Michael Tiller	Bethune-Cookman	15.06	15.31	15.34				15.34	
15	Eric Bethea	Indiana	15.11	14.23	15.32				15.32	
	Lasheon Strozier	North Carolina A&T	x	x	x				NM	

==== Shot put ====
Rank	Name	University	Round						Mark	Team score
Rank	Name	University	1	2	3	4	5	6	Mark	Team score
1st place, gold medalist(s)	Mostafa Hassan Egypt	Colorado State	19.07	x	20.36	19.97	20.49	21.27	21.27	10
2nd place, silver medalist(s)	Denzel Comenentia Netherlands	Georgia	19.44	19.11	19.56	19.18	19.86	19.88	19.88	8
3rd place, bronze medalist(s)	Oghenakpobo Efekoro Nigeria	Virginia	18.95	18.79	19.26	18.57	19.19	19.84	19.84	6
4	Jared Kern	Southern Illinois	19.20	x	17.74	18.97	19.77	x	19.77	5
5	Josh Awotunde	South Carolina	18.13	x	19.20	19.14	x	19.66	19.66	4
6	Nicholas Demaline	Ohio State	x	19.44	x	19.19	18.62	x	19.44	3
7	Nicolai Ceban	Kansas	19.28	x	18.64	x	19.33	19.37	19.37	2
8	Aaron Castle	Arizona	18.54	19.15	18.68	18.96	19.20	18.97	19.20	1
9	Kyle Felpel	Alabama	18.80	18.99	x	x	x	18.88	18.99	
10	Willie Morrison	Indiana	17.21	18.71	14.39				18.71	
11	Alex Renner	North Dakota State	18.42	18.67	18.47				18.67	
12	Matthew Katnik	USC	18.37	18.62	x				18.62	
13	Austin Droogsma	Florida State	17.53	18.16	18.08				18.16	
14	Brian Williams	Ole Miss	x	17.53	17.88				17.88	
15	Dotun Ogundeji	UCLA	x	x	17.27				17.27	
	Filip Mihaljević Croatia	Virginia	x	x	x				NM	

==== Weight throw ====
Rank	Name	University	Round						Mark	Team score
Rank	Name	University	1	2	3	4	5	6	Mark	Team score
1st place, gold medalist(s)	Johnnie Jackson	LSU	22.64	22.88	x	21.78	21.94	x	22.88	10
2nd place, silver medalist(s)	Grant Cartwright	Michigan	21.79	22.55	22.70	21.74	x	22.00	22.70	8
3rd place, bronze medalist(s)	Jordan Young	Virginia	x	22.09	22.32	22.28	22.41	x	22.41	6
4	Rudy Winkler	Cornell	22.18	22.30	21.72	20.91	x	x	22.30	5
5	Josh Davis	NC State	21.28	20.71	21.77	22.04	21.07	x	22.04	4
6	Gleb Dudarev	Kansas	x	x	21.96	x	x	21.97	21.97	3
7	Joseph Ellis	Michigan	20.91	x	21.37	x	21.02	21.73	21.73	2
8	Riley Budde	Wisconsin	21.64	21.14	x	21.23	x	x	21.64	1
9	Daniel Haugh	Alabama	21.20	21.32	21.56	21.23	x	21.48	21.56	
10	Adam Kelly	Princeton	21.13	x	21.08				21.13	
11	Alex Poursanidis	Georgia	x	20.99	20.49				20.99	
12	AJ McFarland	Florida	19.61	20.99	20.21				20.99	
13	Elias Hakansson	Alabama	x	20.86	x				20.86	
14	Reginald Jagers	Kent State	20.66	20.03	20.43				20.66	
15	James Hubbard	Long Beach State	x	x	20.11				17.27	
16	Aleks Rapp	Tulsa	20.02	20.03	20.08				20.08	

==== Heptathlon ====
The highest mark recorded in each event is highlighted in yellow

Rank	Athlete	University	60m	LJ	SP	HJ	60m H	PV	1000m	Points	Team score
1st place, gold medalist(s)	Devon Williams	Georgia	6.88	7.83	14.11	1.95	7.75	4.76	2:41.26	6177	10
2nd place, silver medalist(s)	Tim Duckworth	Kentucky	6.77	7.77	13.09	2.16	8.10	5.26	3:04.24	6165	8
3rd place, bronze medalist(s)	Karl Saluri Estonia	Georgia	6.79	7.58	14.41	1.86	8.33	4.96	2:36.92	6051	6
4	Hunter Price	Colorado State	6.94	7.30	13.27	2.04	8.01	4.66	2:37.99	5996	5
5	Lindon Victor Grenada	Texas A&M	6.99	7.23	16.55	2.07	8.43	4.76 NR	2:51.14	5976	4
6	Harrison Williams	Stanford	7.02	7.03	13.34	1.95	8.23	5.36	2:39.45	5970	3
7	Wolf Mahler	Texas	6.94	7.00	12.38	1.92	8.31	4.86	2:34.15	5791	2
8	Jonathan Wells	Illinois	7.13	7.44	13.67	2.16	8.11	4.76	3:09.21	5786	1
9	Hunter Veith	Wichita State	7.00	7.55	12.41	1.95	8.15	4.96	2:56.44	5760	
10	Kevin Nielsen	BYU	7.12	7.34	11.91	1.95	8.44	4.76	2:44.47	5630	
11	Mitch Modin	Oregon	7.13	7.10	13.16	1.95	8.35	4.66	2:55.01	5527	
12	Gabe Moore	Arkansas	7.15	6.69	13.51	1.95	8.49	4.66	2:44.58	5519	
13	Austin Jamerson	Cornell	7.17	7.22	12.47	2.10	8.34	4.06	2:50.84	5509	
14	John Seals	George Mason	7.13	6.97	12.35	2.10	8.22	4.66	3:12.70	5447	
15	Steven Bastien	Michigan	6.96	7.43	13.12	1.92	8.34	NH	DNF	4119	
16	Steele Wasik	Texas	7.14	6.85	13.72	1.98	DNF	NH	DNF	3107	

=== Men's team scores ===
- Top 10 and ties shown

Rank	University	Team score
1st place, gold medalist(s)	Texas A&M	46
2nd place, silver medalist(s)	Florida	45.5
3rd place, bronze medalist(s)	Oregon	38
4	Georgia	35.5
5	Arkansas	33
6	LSU	30
7	Virginia Tech	23.5
8	Alabama	22
9	Texas	21
10	Syracuse	20
10	Tennessee	20

=== Women's results ===
==== w60 meters ====
- Final results shown, not prelims

Rank	Name	University	Time	Team score
1st place, gold medalist(s)	Hannah Cunliffe	Oregon	7.14	10
2nd place, silver medalist(s)	Javianne Oliver	Kentucky	7.16	8
3rd place, bronze medalist(s)	Ariana Washington	Oregon	7.20	6
4	Ashley Henderson	San Diego State	7.22	5
5	Deajah Stevens	Oregon	7.22	4
6	Kortnei Johnson	LSU	7.22	3
7	Quanesha Burks	Alabama	7.27	2
8	Mikiah Brisco	LSU	7.29	1

==== w200 meters ====
- Final results shown, not prelims

Rank	Name	University	Time	Team score
1st place, gold medalist(s)	Ariana Washington	Oregon	22.42	10
2nd place, silver medalist(s)	Hannah Cunliffe	Oregon	22.53	8
3rd place, bronze medalist(s)	Deanna Hill	USC	22.54	6
4	Ashley Henderson	San Diego State	22.83	5
5	Brittany Brown	Iowa	22.92	4
6	Jada Martin	LSU	22.96	3
7	Diamond Spaulding	Texas A&M	23.09	2
8	Gabrielle Thomas	Harvard	23.35	1

==== w400 meters ====
- Final results shown, not prelims

Rank	Name	University	Time	Team score
1st place, gold medalist(s)	Shakima Wimbley	Miami	51.07	10
2nd place, silver medalist(s)	Kendall Ellis	USC	51.07	8
3rd place, bronze medalist(s)	Sage Watson Canada	Arizona	51.84	6
4	Daina Harper	Arkansas	51.93	5
5	Alex Gholston	Alabama	52.23	4
6	Chrisann Gordon Jamaica	Texas	52.81	3
7	Zola Golden	Texas	52.90	2
8	Brittny Ellis	Miami	53.13	1

==== w800 meters ====
- Final results shown, not prelims

Rank	Name	University	Time	Team score
1	Raevyn Rogers	Oregon	2:01.09	10
2	Hanna Green	Virginia Tech	2:02.13	8
3	Shea Collinsworth	BYU	2:02.35	6
4	Jazmine Fray	Texas A&M	2:03.00	5
5	Ruby Stauber	LSU	2:03.01	4
6	Jasmine Staebler	Iowa State	2:04.08	3
7	Olivia Baker	Stanford	2:04.45	2
8	Abike Egbeniyi Nigeria	Middle Tennessee	2:06.86	1

==== wMile ====
- Final results shown, not prelims

Rank	Name	University	Time	Team score
1st place, gold medalist(s)	Karisa Nelson	Samford	4:31.24	10
2nd place, silver medalist(s)	Elinor Purrier	New Hampshire	4:31.88	8
3rd place, bronze medalist(s)	Danae Rivers	Penn State	4:33.89	6
4	Kaela Edwards	Oklahoma State	4:34.27	5
5	Therese Haiss	Arkansas	4:34.54	4
6	Nikki Hiltz	Arkansas	4:34.57	3
7	Millie Paladino	Providence	4:34.62	2
8	Siofra Cleirigh Buttner	Villanova	4:34.78	1
9	Amy-Eloise Neale United Kingdom	Washington	4:35.12	
10	Grace Barnett	Clemson	4:38.27	

==== w3000 meters ====
Rank	Name	University	Time	Team score
1st place, gold medalist(s)	Dani Jones	Colorado	9:09.20	10
2nd place, silver medalist(s)	Karissa Schweizer	Missouri	9:09.33	8
3rd place, bronze medalist(s)	Katie Rainsberger	Oregon	9:09.87	6
4	Samantha Nadel	Oregon	9:10.88	5
5	Vanessa Fraser	Stanford	9:10.92	4
6	Katherine Receveur	Indiana	9:12.61	3
7	Allie Buchalski	Furman	9:13.39	2
8	Erin Clark	Colorado	9:13.56	1
9	Alli Cash	Oregon	9:14.98	
10	Tessa Barrett	Penn State	9:16.50	
11	Elise Cranny	Stanford	9:17.85	
12	Katie Jensen	Rice	9:20.50	
13	Gina Sereno	Michigan	9:21.67	
14	Taylor Werner	Arkansas	9:27.66	
15	Rachel Koon	NC State	9:33.22	
16	Claire Green	Arizona	9:47.57	

==== w5000 meters ====
Rank	Name	University	Time	Team score
1st place, gold medalist(s)	Karissa Schweizer	Missouri	15:19.14	10
2nd place, silver medalist(s)	Erin Finn	Michigan	15:27.36	8
3rd place, bronze medalist(s)	Anna Rohrer	Notre Dame	15:29.83	6
4	Allie Buchalski	Furman	15:41.69	5
5	Tessa Barrett	Penn State	15:42.29	4
6	Jordann McDermitt	Eastern Michigan	15:43.95	3
7	Brianna Ilarda	Providence	15:46.13	2
8	Anne-Marie Blaney	UCF	15:49.26	1
9	Alice Wright United Kingdom	New Mexico	15:56.24	
10	Olivia Pratt	Butler	15:56.54	
11	Erika Kemp	NC State	15:59.19	
12	Lauren LaRocco	Portland	16:03.80	
13	Maggie Schmaedick	Oregon	16:07.30	
14	Makena Morley	Colorado	16:12.39	
15	Grayson Murphy	Utah	16:24.00	
	Judy Pendergast	Harvard	DQ	

==== w60 meters hurdles ====
- Final results shown, not prelims

Rank	Name	University	Time	Team score
1st place, gold medalist(s)	Sasha Wallace	Oregon	7.90	10
2nd place, silver medalist(s)	Devynne Charlton Bahamas	Purdue	7.93	8
3rd place, bronze medalist(s)	Pedrya Seymour Bahamas	Illinois	7.97	6
4	Anna Cockrell	USC	7.99	5
5	Rushelle Burton Jamaica	Texas	8.02	4
6	Tobi Amusan Nigeria	UTEP	8.03	3
7	Jasmine Camacho-Quinn Puerto Rico	Kentucky	8.11	2
8	Alaysha Johnson	Oregon	8.13	1

==== w4 × 400 meters relay ====
Rank	University	Athletes	Time	Team score
1st place, gold medalist(s)	USC	Cameron Pettigrew, Amalie Iuel Norway, Deanna Hill, Kendall Ellis	3:27.03	10
2nd place, silver medalist(s)	Oregon	Makenzie Dunmore, Deajah Stevens, Elexis Guster, Raevyn Rogers	3:27.07	8
3rd place, bronze medalist(s)	Texas A&M	Jaevin Reed, Briyahna Desrosiers, Danyel White, Jazmine Fray	3:28.36	6
4	Alabama	Takyera Roberson, Alex Gholston, Diamond Gause, Domonique Williams Trinidad and Tobago	3:28.62	5
5	Baylor	Taylor Bennett, Kiana Hawn, Kiana Horton, Leticia De Souza Brazil	3:30.60	4
6	Ohio State	Beatrice Hannan, Karrington Winters, Aaliyah Barnes, Maggie Barrie Sierra Leone	3:31.23	3
7	Miami	Aiyanna Stiverne Canada, Brittny Ellis, Michelle Atherley, Shakima Wimbley	3:31.85	2
8	Florida	Brandee Johnson, Destinee Gause, Taylor Sharpe, Sharrika Barnett	3:31.94	1
9	South Carolina	Precious Holmes, Tyler Brockington, Aliyah Abrams Guyana, Briana Haith	3:32.14	
10	Purdue	Symone Black, Chloe Abbott, Jahneya Mitchell, Brionna Thomas	3:32.34	
11	Arkansas	Sunkietra McCallister, Brianna Swinton, Ceara Watson, Daina Harper	3:32.34	
12	LSU	Kymber Payne, Jada Martin, Rachel Misher, Travia Jones Canada	3:32.34	

==== wDistance medley relay ====
Rank	University	Athletes	Time	Team score
1st place, gold medalist(s)	Colorado	Tabor Scholl, Elissa Mann, Sage Hurta, Dani Jones	11:00.34	10
2nd place, silver medalist(s)	Stanford	Vanessa Fraser, Missy Mongiovi, Malika Waschmann, Elise Cranny	11:00.36	8
3rd place, bronze medalist(s)	Oregon	Lilli Burdon, Ashante Horsley, Brooke Feldmeier, Katie Rainsberger	11:00.68	6
4	BYU	Ashleigh Warner, Brenna Porter, Kristi Rush, Erica Birk	11:03.42	5
5	Michigan	Jamie Morrissey, Jade Harrison, Jaimie Phelan, Gina Sereno	11:04.74	4
6	Penn State	Danae Rivers, Tichina Rhodes, Rachel Banks, Julie Kocjancic	11:04.89	3
7	Kansas	Riley Cooney, Nicole Montgomery, Whitney Adams, Hannah Richardson	11:05.35	2
8	Notre Dame	Kelly Hart, Payton Miller, Jamie Marvil, Jessica Harris	11:05.76	1
9	Indiana	Brenna Calder, Taylor Williams, Olivia Hippensteel, Katherine Receveur	11:06.03	
10	LSU	Ruby Stauber, Travia Jones Canada, Erika Lewis, Morgan Schuetz	11:06.83	
11	Arkansas	Regan Ward, Brianna Swinton, Ceara Watson, Taylor Werner	11:10.41	
12	Villanova	Kaley Ciluffo, Amari Onque-Shabazz, McKenna Keegan, Sammy Bockoven	11:13.59	

==== wHigh jump ====
Rank	Name	University	1.76	1.81	1.84	1.87	1.90	1.93	1.96	Mark	Team score
1st place, gold medalist(s)	Madeline Fagan	Georgia	–	o	o	o	xxo	xxo	r	1.93	10
2nd place, silver medalist(s)	Tatiana Gousin Greece	Georgia	–	o	o	xxo	xo	xxx		1.90	8
3rd place, bronze medalist(s)	Logan Boss	Mississippi State	o	o	o	o	xxo	xxx		1.90	6
4	Stacey Destin	Alabama	o	xxo	o	o	xxx			1.87	5
5	Nicole Greene	North Carolina	o	xxo	o	xxx				1.84	4
6	Shelley Spires	Air Force	o	o	xo	xxx				1.84	3
7	Kimberly Williamson Jamaica	Kansas State	o	o	xxo	xxx				1.84	2
8	Zarriea Willis	Texas Tech	o	xo	xxx					1.81	0.5
8	Lisanne Hagens	Arizona	o	xo	xxx					1.81	0.5
10	Nikki Manson	Akron	o	xxo	xxx					1.81	
11	Eleonora Omoregie	Florida State	xo	xxx						1.76	
11	Janae Moffitt	Purdue	xo	xxx						1.76	
13	Clarissa Cutliff	FIU	xxo	xxx						1.76	
13	Andrea Stapleton	BYU	xxo	xxx						1.76	
	Kandie Bloch-Jones	Illinois	xxx							NH	
	Jailah Mason	Morgan State	xxx							NH	

==== wPole vault ====
Rank	Name	University	4.05	4.20	4.30	4.40	4.45	4.50	Mark	Team score
1st place, gold medalist(s)	Lakan Taylor	Alabama	o	o	xo	o	o	xxx	4.45	10
2nd place, silver medalist(s)	Annie Rhodes	Baylor	o	xo	o	xxo	xxo	xxx	4.45	8
3rd place, bronze medalist(s)	Olivia Gruver	Kentucky	–	o	o	xo	xxx		4.40	6
4	Lucy Bryan United Kingdom	Akron	xo	o	xxo	xo	xxx		4.40	5
5	Victoria Weeks	Arkansas	o	o	o	xxx			4.30	4
6	Desiree Freier	Arkansas	o	xo	xo	xxx			4.30	3
7	Alexis Weeks	Arkansas	o	o	xxx				4.20	1.5
7	Elizabeth Quick	Washington	o	o	xxx				4.20	1.5
9	Allison Harris	Princeton	xo	o	xxx				4.20	
10	Shay Petty	Texas	o	xo	xxx				4.20	
11	Kally Long	Texas	xo	xxo	xxx				4.20	
12	Sarah Bell	Vanderbilt	o	xxx					4.05	
13	Madison Heath	Duke	xo	xxx					4.05	
13	Lindsey Murray	Ole Miss	xo	xxx					4.05	
13	Emily Gunderson	Texas A&M	xo	xxx					4.05	
	Kathryn Tomczak	Air Force	xxx						NH	

==== wLong jump ====
Rank	Name	University	Round						Mark	Team score
Rank	Name	University	1	2	3	4	5	6	Mark	Team score
1st place, gold medalist(s)	Sha'Keela Saunders	Kentucky	6.42	6.70	6.55	x	6.62	6.90	6.90	10
2nd place, silver medalist(s)	Quanesha Burks	Alabama	6.64	6.60	x	6.65	6.72	x	6.72	8
3rd place, bronze medalist(s)	Keturah Orji	Georgia	6.26	6.34	6.34	x	6.58	x	6.58	6
4	Kate Hall	Georgia	x	6.45	x	x	6.48	6.35	6.48	5
5	Savannah Carson	Purdue	6.36	x	6.28	6.19	6.25	6.48	6.48	4
6	Rougui Sou	South Carolina	6.11	x	6.35	6.37	x	6.46	6.46	3
7	Kendell Williams	Georgia	x	x	6.29	6.12	6.43	6.25	6.43	2
8	Darrielle McQueen	Florida	6.22	6.29	x	6.16	6.30	6.38	6.38	1
9	Taliyah Brooks	Arkansas	x	6.25	6.29	6.07	6.28	6.33	6.33	
10	Destiny Carter	Kentucky	6.28	x	5.95				6.28	
11	Sydney Conley	Kansas	6.19	6.00	6.24				6.24	
12	Jhoanmy Luque	Iowa State	x	6.16	6.17				6.17	
13	Jahisha Thomas	Iowa	6.17	5.91	5.92				6.17	
14	Jogaile Petrokaite	Florida State	6.09	x	x				6.09	
15	Baileh Simms	Oklahoma	5.99	x	x				5.99	
16	Samara Spencer	South Dakota	5.04	5.55	5.30				5.55	

==== wTriple jump ====
Rank	Name	University	Round						Mark	Team score
Rank	Name	University	1	2	3	4	5	6	Mark	Team score
1st place, gold medalist(s)	Keturah Orji	Georgia	14.11	14.08	-	-	-	-	14.11	10
2nd place, silver medalist(s)	Yanis David France	Florida	13.39	13.76	x	13.70	13.62	x	13.76	8
3rd place, bronze medalist(s)	Natasha Dicks	South Carolina	x	13.47	x	x	x	x	13.47	6
4	Marshay Ryan	Auburn	12.92	12.79	13.16	x	13.04	13.43	13.43	5
5	Tiffany Flynn	Mississippi State	13.31	13.25	13.18	13.39	13.21	x	13.39	4
6	Viershanie Latham	Texas Tech	12.77	12.99	13.16	12.92	13.13	13.39	13.39	3
7	Simone Charley	Vanderbilt	13.29	13.21	12.96	13.21	13.31	13.19	13.31	2
8	Dannielle Gibson	Penn State	13.00	13.23	12.67	13.10	x	13.01	13.23	1
9	Jhoanmy Luque	Iowa State	12.91	13.20	x	x	13.14	13.21	13.21	
10	Shardia Lawrence	Kansas State	12.79	13.00	13.15				13.15	
11	Amber Hughes	Tennessee State	13.09	12.91	x				13.09	
12	Iana Amsterdam	Clemson	11.89	12.77	13.06				13.06	
13	Sha'Keela Saunders	Kentucky	12.61	12.68	12.80				12.80	
14	Jannell Hadnot	New Mexico	12.57	12.80	x				12.80	
15	Darrielle McQueen	Florida	12.23	12.38	x				12.38	
	Marie-Josee Ebwea-Bile	Kentucky	x	x	x				NM	

==== wShot put ====
Rank	Name	University	Round						Mark	Team score
Rank	Name	University	1	2	3	4	5	6	Mark	Team score
1st place, gold medalist(s)	Raven Saunders	Ole Miss	18.31	17.98	18.04	19.20	18.10	19.56	19.56	10
2nd place, silver medalist(s)	Danniel Thomas Jamaica	Kent State	18.00	17.90	17.99	18.26	18.40	x	18.40	8
3rd place, bronze medalist(s)	Brittany Mann	USC	x	17.78	16.79	x	16.93	17.18	17.78	6
4	Maggie Ewen	Arizona State	17.57	x	16.67	x	x	x	17.57	5
5	Jessica Woodard	Oklahoma	17.55	x	x	x	x	x	17.55	4
6	Emmonnie Henderson	Louisville	16.48	17.13	17.41	17.50	x	x	17.50	3
7	Lloydricia Cameron	Florida	16.84	16.57	17.34	16.14	17.29	17.31	17.34	2
8	Janeah Stewart	Ole Miss	14.69	15.27	17.23	15.56	16.55	16.34	17.23	1
9	Cion Hicks	Baylor	16.13	16.76	16.56	x	x	x	16.76	
10	Amelia Strickler	Miami (Ohio)	x	16.61	16.52				16.61	
11	Nikki Okwelogu Nigeria	Harvard	16.13	15.73	15.34				16.13	
12	Torie Owers	UCLA	15.06	16.07	15.12				16.07	
13	Aaliyah Pete	Colorado State	15.89	15.91	16.04				16.04	
14	Erin Farmer	Arkansas State	15.84	x	15.73				15.84	
15	Kiley Sabin	Minnesota	15.81	x	15.73				15.81	
16	Haley Teel	Alabama	x	15.00	15.69				15.69	

==== Weight throw ====
Rank	Name	University	Round						Mark	Team score
Rank	Name	University	1	2	3	4	5	6	Mark	Team score
1st place, gold medalist(s)	Annette Echikunwoke	University of Cincinnati	21.87	x	x	21.81	x	22.42	22.42	10
2nd place, silver medalist(s)	Dolly Nyemah	Louisville	20.47	20.15	21.42	21.73	21.49	21.74	21.74	8
3rd place, bronze medalist(s)	Victoria Merriweather	Charlotte	18.46	21.42	19.36	21.35	21.48	21.74	21.74	6
4	Sade Olatoye	Ohio State	21.69	20.71	21.07	x	x	x	21.69	5
5	LaPorscha Wells	Georgia State	21.21	x	x	x	20.97	x	21.21	4
6	Maggie Ewen	Arizona State	x	20.21	20.67	20.44	20.97	20.51	20.97	3
7	Raven Saunders	Ole Miss	x	20.14	20.81	20.33	x	20.61	20.81	2
8	Jasmine Manigault	Auburn	20.39	20.72	20.20	20.25	x	20.05	20.72	1
9	Janee' Kassanavoid	Kansas State	19.77	20.71	x	19.31	18.39	x	20.71	
10	Stamatia Scarvelis	Tennessee	20.19	x	20.50				20.50	
11	Brooke Andersen	Northern Arizona	x	20.29	18.38				20.29	
12	Marthaline Cooper	Winthrop	20.20	x	x				20.20	
13	Janeah Stewart	Ole Miss	18.46	20.05	x				20.05	
14	Shelby Ashe	Georgia	x	19.86	x				19.86	
15	Jordan McClendon	LSU	19.43	18.99	19.82				19.82	
16	Banke Oginni	Wisconsin	19.25	19.44	x				19.44	

==== wPentathlon ====
The highest mark recorded in each event is highlighted in yellow

Rank	Athlete	University	60m H	HJ	SP	LJ	800	Points	Team score
1st place, gold medalist(s)	Kendell Williams	Georgia	8.03	1.78	12.96	6.47	2:15.61	4682	10
2nd place, silver medalist(s)	Taliyah Brooks	Arkansas	8.13	1.84	11.97	6.48	2:22.39	4580	8
3rd place, bronze medalist(s)	Nina Schultz Canada	Kansas State	8.41	1.81	12.14	6.18	2:26.55	4340	6
4	Michelle Atherley	Miami	8.21	1.75	12.69	5.67	2:17.05	4319	5
5	Leigha Brown	Arkansas	8.48	1.72	12.45	5.61	2:15.00	4216	4
6	Stacey Destin	Alabama	8.63	1.90	11.71	5.78	2:32.15	4186	3
7	Georgia Ellenwood Canada	Wisconsin	8.64	1.72	12.12	5.77	2:18.29	4162	2
8	Rose Jackson	North Dakota State	8.77	1.60	12.78	6.09	2:17.57	4142	1
9	Kelsey Herman	Arkansas	8.34	1.75	11.92	6.06	2:33.68	4139	
10	Zoe Hughes	Harvard	8.80	1.63	12.73	5.94	2:19.81	4089	
11	Nikki Larch-Miller	Wichita State	8.26	1.63	11.90	5.64	2:17.93	4088	
12	Jaclyn Siefring	Akron	8.76	1.63	12.13	5.88	2:16.72	4084	
13	Holly Hankenson	Louisville	8.52	1.57	11.65	5.74	2:14.88	4017	
14	Louisa Grauvogel	Georgia	8.47	1.60	12.37	5.81	2:23.99	4008	
15	Melissa-Maree Farrington	Florida State	8.40	1.72	11.46	5.80	2:32.69	3992	
16	Breanne Borman	Wichita State	8.78	1.60	12.72	5.33	2:33.25	3705	

=== Women's team scores ===
- Top 10 and ties shown

Rank	University	Team score
1st place, gold medalist(s)	Oregon	84
2nd place, silver medalist(s)	Georgia	51
3rd place, bronze medalist(s)	Alabama	37
4	USC	35
5	Arkansas	32
6	Kentucky	26
7	Colorado	21
8	Miami	18
8	Missouri	18
10	Penn State	14
10	Stanford	14

== See also ==
- NCAA Men's Division I Indoor Track and Field Championships
- NCAA Women's Division I Indoor Track and Field Championships
