= 2016 NCAA Division I Outdoor Track and Field Championships =

- Edition: 95th (Men); 35th (Women)
- Dates: June 8–11, 2016
- Host city: Eugene, Oregon; University of Oregon
- Venue: Hayward Field
- Events: 42

The 2016 NCAA Division I Outdoor Track and Field Championships were the 95th NCAA Men's Division I Outdoor Track and Field Championships and the 35th NCAA Women's Division I Outdoor Track and Field Championships held for the fourth consecutive year at Hayward Field in Eugene, Oregon on the campus of the University of Oregon. In total, forty-two different men's and women's track and field events were contested from June 8 to June 11, 2016.

== Results ==
=== Men's events ===
==== 100 meters ====
- Only top eight final results shown; no prelims are listed

Wind: -2.3 mps

Rank	Name	University	Time	Notes
1st place, gold medalist(s)	Jarrion Lawson	Arkansas	10.22	
2nd place, silver medalist(s)	Christian Coleman	Tennessee	10.23	
3rd place, bronze medalist(s)	(Jamaica) Senoj-Jay Givans	Texas	10.25	
4	Cameron Burrell	Houston	10.26	(10.253)
5	John Teeters	Oklahoma State	10.26	(10.257)
6	Markesh Woodson	Missouri	10.32	
7	Kenzo Cotton	Arkansas	10.35	
8	(United Kingdom) Nethaneel Mitchell-Blake	LSU	12.05	

==== 200 meters ====
- Only top eight final results shown; no prelims are listed

Wind: -0.2 mps

Rank	Name	University	Time	Notes
1st place, gold medalist(s)	Jarrion Lawson	Arkansas	20.19	
2nd place, silver medalist(s)	Christian Coleman	Tennessee	20.26	
3rd place, bronze medalist(s)	Brendon Rodney Canada	LIU Brooklyn	20.39	
4	Renard Howell	LSU	20.55	(20.543)
5	Kenzo Cotton	Arkansas	20.55	(20.544)
6	Tevin Hester	Clemson	20.68	
7	Nick Gray	Ohio State	20.93	
-	Nethaneel Mitchell-Blake United Kingdom	LSU	DNS	

==== 400 meters ====
- Only top eight final results shown; no prelims are listed

Rank	Name	University	Time	Notes
1st place, gold medalist(s)	Arman Hall	Florida	44.82	
2nd place, silver medalist(s)	Fitzroy Dunkley Jamaica	LSU	45.06	
3rd place, bronze medalist(s)	Michael Cherry	LSU	45.11	
4	Marcus Chambers	Oregon	45.27	
5	Najee Glass	Florida	45.61	
6	Nathan Strother	Tennessee	45.72	
7	Kunle Fasasi Nigeria	Florida	46.10	
8	Ricky Morgan Jr	USC	46.63	

==== 800 meters ====
- Only top eight final results shown; no prelims are listed

Rank	Name	University	Time	Notes
1st place, gold medalist(s)	Donavan Brazier	Texas A&M	1:43.55	NJR
2nd place, silver medalist(s)	Brandon McBride Canada	Mississippi State	1:44.50	
3rd place, bronze medalist(s)	Shaquille Walker	BYU	1:45.17	
4	Isaiah Harris	Penn State	1:45.76	
5	Sampson Laari Ghana	MTSU	1:47.15	
6	Chris Sanders	La Salle	1:47.50	
7	Eliud Rutto Kenya	MTSU	1:48.54	
8	Robert Heppenstall Canada	Wake Forest	1:51.14	

==== 1500 meters ====
- Only top eight final results shown; no prelims are listed

Rank	Name	University	Time	Notes
1st place, gold medalist(s)	Clayton Murphy	Akron	3:36.38	
2nd place, silver medalist(s)	Izaic Yorks	Washington	3:38.06	
3rd place, bronze medalist(s)	Henry Wynne	Virginia	3:38.35	
4	Brannon Kidder	Penn State	3:40.67	
5	Sam Prakel	Oregon	3:40.84	
6	Robert Domanic	Ole Miss	3:41.71	
7	Craig Engels	Ole Miss	3:43.23	
8	James Randon	Yale	3:43.84	

==== 5000 meters ====
- Only top eight final results shown; no prelims are listed

Rank	Name	University	Time	Notes
1st place, gold medalist(s)	Edward Cheserek	Oregon	13:25.59	
2nd place, silver medalist(s)	Sean McGorty	Stanford	13:26.10	
3rd place, bronze medalist(s)	Patrick Tiernan Australia	Villanova	13:27.07	
4	Thomas Curtin	Virginia Tech	13:27.64	
5	Morgan McDonald	Wisconsin	13:29.79	
6	Grant Fisher	Stanford	13:30.13	
7	Ryan Wailing	Ole Miss	13:31.30	
8	Patrick Corona	Air Force	13:31.66	

==== 10000 meters ====
- Only top eight final results shown; no prelims are listed

Rank	Name	University	Time	Notes
1st place, gold medalist(s)	Edward Cheserek	Oregon	29:09.57	
2nd place, silver medalist(s)	Futsum Zienasellassie	Northern Arizona	29:10.68	
3rd place, bronze medalist(s)	Gabe Gonzalez	Arkansas	29:11.09	
4	Pierce Murphy	Colorado	29:12.49	
5	Reid Buchanan	Portland	29:13.40	
6	Jacob Thomson	Kentucky	29:13.73	
7	Luis Vargas	N.C. State	29:18.40	
8	Erik Peterson	Butler	29:23.48	

==== 110 meters hurdles ====
- Only top eight final results shown; no prelims are listed

Wind: -0.9 mps

Rank	Name	University	Time	Notes
1st place, gold medalist(s)	Devon Allen	Oregon	13.50	
2nd place, silver medalist(s)	Nick Anderson	Kentucky	13.67	
3rd place, bronze medalist(s)	Adarius Washington	Indiana State	13.68	
4	Freddie Crittenden III	Syracuse	13.70	
5	Amere Lattin	Houston	13.80	
6	Tony Brown	Alabama	13.81	
7	Dondre Echols	South Carolina	13.84	
8	Jordan Moore	LSU	13.88	

==== 400 meters hurdles ====
- Only top eight final results shown; no prelims are listed

Rank	Name	University	Time	Notes
1st place, gold medalist(s)	Eric Futch	Florida	48.91	
2nd place, silver medalist(s)	TJ Holmes	Florida	49.31	
3rd place, bronze medalist(s)	Kenny Selmon	North Carolina	49.56	
4	Robert Grant	Texas A&M	49.62	
5	Taylor McLaughlin	Michigan	49.74	
6	Rai Benjamin	UCLA	49.82	
7	Mica-Jonathan Petit-Homme Haiti	LIU Brooklyn	50.71	
8	Jussi Kanervo Finland	South Carolina	52.11	

==== 3000 meters steeplechase ====
- Only top eight final results shown; no prelims are listed

Rank	Name	University	Time	Notes
1st place, gold medalist(s)	Mason Ferlic	Michigan	8:27.16	
2nd place, silver medalist(s)	Frankline Tonui Kenya	Arkansas	8:30.67	
3rd place, bronze medalist(s)	Edwin Kibichiy Kenya	Louisville	8:30.71	
4	Dylan Blankenbaker	Oklahoma	8:34.69	
5	Darren Fahy	Georgetown	8:36.73	
6	Zak Seddon United Kingdom	Florida State	8:38.26	
7	Troy Reeder	Furman	8:42.26	
8	MJ Erb	Ole Miss	8:43.81	

==== 4 x 100 meters relay ====
- Only top eight final results shown; no prelims are listed

Rank	University	Time	Notes
1st place, gold medalist(s)	LSU	38.42	
2nd place, silver medalist(s)	Houston	38.44	
3rd place, bronze medalist(s)	Arkansas	38.49	
4	Florida	38.54	
5	Western Kentucky	38.60	
6	TCU	38.72	
7	N.C. State	39.48	
8	Arizona State	39.90	

==== 4 x 400 meters relay ====
- Only top eight final results shown; no prelims are listed

Rank	University	Time	Notes
1st place, gold medalist(s)	LSU	3:00.69	
2nd place, silver medalist(s)	Florida	3:01.12	
3rd place, bronze medalist(s)	Nebraska	3:03.39	
4	Texas A&M	3:03.94	
5	Clemson	3:04.75	
6	Purdue	3:06.25	
7	Ohio State	3:06.27	
	Mississippi State	DQ	

==== Long Jump ====
- Only top eight final results shown; no prelims are listed

Rank	Name	University	Distance	Wind	Notes
1st place, gold medalist(s)	Jarrion Lawson	Arkansas	8.15m (26-9 )	+1.6	
2nd place, silver medalist(s)	Roelf Pienaar South Africa	Arkansas State	7.93m (26-1/4 )	+0.4	
3rd place, bronze medalist(s)	KeAndre Bates	Florida	7.82m (25-8 )	-0.7	
4	Corey Crawford	Rutgers	7.69m (25-2 3/4 )	+1.1	
5	Adoree Jackson	USC	7.66m (25-1 3/4 )	+1.8	
6	Jonathan Addison	N.C. State	7.62m (25-0 )	-0.3	
7	Emmanuel Williams	Northwestern State	7.59m (24-11 )	-2.6	
8	Zack Bazile	Ohio State	7.58m (24-10 1/2 )	-1.2	

==== Triple Jump ====
- Only top eight final results shown; no prelims are listed

Rank	Name	University	Distance	Wind	Notes
1st place, gold medalist(s)	Latario Collie Bahamas	Texas A&M	16.97	+1.4	
2nd place, silver medalist(s)	KeAndre Bates	Florida	16.73	+3.2	
3rd place, bronze medalist(s)	Matthew O'Neal	South Florida	16.59	-0.6	
4	Tim White	Arizona State	16.57	+0.7	
5	Shawn Johnson	Auburn	16.28	+0.9	
6	Brian Leap	Penn State	16.13	+1.4	
7	Lathone Collie Bahamas	Texas A&M	16.02	-1.8	
8	Kaiwan Culmer	Nebraska	15.93	+ 1.0	

==== High Jump ====
- Only top eight final results shown; no prelims are listed

Rank	Name	University	Height	Notes
1st place, gold medalist(s)	Randall Cunningham II	USC	2.25m (7-4 1/2 )	
2nd place, silver medalist(s)	Christoff Bryan Jamaica	Kansas State	2.22m (7-3 1/4 )	
3rd place, bronze medalist(s)	Trey Mcrae	UNC Charlotte	2.19m (7-2 1/4 )	
4	Avion Jones	East Carolina	2.19m (7-2 1/4 )	
5	Trey Culver	Texas Tech	2.19m (7-2 1/4 )	
6	Bradley Adkins	Texas Tech	2.19m (7-2 1/4 )	
7	Matthew Campbell Jamaica	Albany	2.19m (7-2 1/4 )	
8 (tie)	Kyle Landon	Southern Illinois	2.19m (7-2 1/4 )	
8 (tie)	Keenon Laine	Western Kentucky	2.19m (7-2 1/4 )	

==== Pole Vault ====
- Only top eight final results shown; no prelims are listed

Rank	Name	University	Height	Notes
1st place, gold medalist(s)	Jake Blankenship	Tennessee	5.60m (18-4 1/2 )	
2nd place, silver medalist(s)	Torben Laidig Germany	Virginia Tech	5.55m (18-2 1/2 )	
3rd place, bronze medalist(s)	Devin King	Southeastern Louisiana	5.45m (17-10 1/2 )	
4	Craig Hunter	UConn	5.45m (17-10 1/2 )	
5	Jax Thoirs United Kingdom	Washington	5.45m (17-10 1/2 )	
6	Dylan Bell	Air Force	5.45m (17-10 1/2 )	
7 (tie)	Cole Walsh	Oregon	5.30m (17-4 1/2 )	
7 (tie)	Adam Bragg	Princeton	5.30m (17-4 1/2 )	
7 (tie)	Tray Oates	Samford	5.30m (17-4 1/2 )	

==== Shot Put ====
- Only top eight final results shown; no prelims are listed

Rank	Name	University	Distance	Notes
1st place, gold medalist(s)	Filip Mihaljevic Croatia	Virginia	20.71m (67-11 1/2 )	
2nd place, silver medalist(s)	Chukwuebuka Enekwechi	Purdue	20.37m (66-10 )	
3rd place, bronze medalist(s)	Mostafa Hassan Egypt	Colorado State	20.19m (66-3 )	
4	Nicholas Scarvelis	UCLA	20.17m (66-2 1/4 )	
5	Braheme Days	UCLA	20.03m (65-8 3/4 )	
6	Josh Freeman	Southern Illinois	19.46m (63-10 1/4 )	
7	Josh Awotunde	South Carolina	19.43m (63-9 )	
8	Brett Neelly	Kansas State	19.16m (62-10 1/2 )	

==== Discus throw ====
- Only top eight final results shown; no prelims are listed

Rank	Name	University	Distance	Notes
1st place, gold medalist(s)	Nicholas Percy United Kingdom	Nebraska	61.27 m (201 ft 0 in)	
2nd place, silver medalist(s)	Sam Mattis	Penn	60.96 m (200 ft 0 in)	
3rd place, bronze medalist(s)	Marek Barta Czech Republic	Virginia Tech	60.96 m (200 ft 0 in)	
4	Gerhard De Beer South Africa	Arizona	60.88 m (199 ft 8 in)	
5	Filip Mihaljevic Croatia	Virginia	60.28 m (197 ft 9 in)	
6	Jan-Louw Kotze South Africa	South Alabama	59.79 m (196 ft 1 in)	
7	Reginald Jagers	Kent State	59.56 m (195 ft 4 in)	
8	Kevin Farley	Southeast Missouri State	57.90 m (189 ft 11 in)	

==== Javelin throw ====
- Only top eight final results shown; no prelims are listed

Rank	Name	University	Distance	Notes
1st place, gold medalist(s)	Curtis Thompson	Mississippi State	77.64 m (254 ft 8 in))	
2nd place, silver medalist(s)	Ioannis Kyriazis Greece	Texas A&M	77.25 m (253 ft 5 in)	
3rd place, bronze medalist(s)	John Ampomah Ghana	MTSU	76.44 m (250 ft 9 in)	
4	Emron Gibbs Grenada	Southern Mississippi	74.62 m (244 ft 9 in)	
5	Evan Karakolis Canada	Rice University	73.95 m (242 ft 7 in)	
6	Jay Stell	Navy	73.81 m (242 ft 1 in)	
7	Cody Danielson	Oregon	72.92 m (239 ft 2 in)	
8	Rob Robbins	Cornell	72.52 m (237 ft 11 in)	

==== Hammer throw ====
- Only top eight final results shown; no prelims are listed

Rank	Name	University	Distance	Notes
1st place, gold medalist(s)	Nick Miller United Kingdom	Oklahoma State	73.98 m (242 ft 8 in)	
2nd place, silver medalist(s)	Rudy Winkler	Cornell	72.84 m (238 ft 11 in)	
3rd place, bronze medalist(s)	Greg Skipper	Oregon	71.39 m (234 ft 2 in)	
4	Sean Donnelly	Minnesota	71.28 m (233 ft 10 in)	
5	Anders Eriksson Sweden	Florida	70.48 m (231 ft 2 in)	
6	Chukwuebuka Enekwechi	Purdue	69.74 m (228 ft 9 in)	
7	Adam Keenan Canada	Northern Arizona	69.45 m (227 ft 10 in)	
8	Dempsey McGuigan United Kingdom	Ole Miss	69.23 m (227 ft 1 in)	

==== Decathlon ====
- Only top eight final results shown; no prelims are listed

Rank	Name	University	Points	Notes
1st place, gold medalist(s)	Lindon Victor Grenada	Texas A&M	8,379	
2nd place, silver medalist(s)	Zach Ziemek	Wisconsin	8,300	
3rd place, bronze medalist(s)	Maicel Uibo Estonia	Georgia	8,294	
4	Pau Tonnesen Spain	Arizona	8,103	
5	Harrison Williams	Stanford	8,032	
6	Solomon Simmons	Eastern Michigan	7,936	
7	Karl Saluri Estonia	Georgia	7,934	
8	Steven Bastien	Michigan	7,917	

=== Women's events ===
==== Women's 100 meters ====
- Only top eight final results shown; no prelims are listed

Wind: +2.6 mps

Rank	Name	University	Time	Notes
1st place, gold medalist(s)	Ariana Washington	Oregon	10.95	
2nd place, silver medalist(s)	Ashley Henderson	San Diego State	10.96	
3rd place, bronze medalist(s)	Morolake Akinosun	Texas	11.07	
4	Tynia Gaither Bahamas	USC	11.08	
5	Mikiah Brisco	LSU	11.13	
6	Deanna Hill	USC	11.21	
7	Kianna Gray	Kentucky	11.24	
8	Jennifer Madu	Texas A&M	11.27	

==== Women's 200 meters ====
- Only top eight final results shown; no prelims are listed

Wind: +1.9 mps

Rank	Name	University	Time	Notes
1st place, gold medalist(s)	Ariana Washington	Oregon	22.21	
2nd place, silver medalist(s)	Deajah Stevens	Oregon	22.25	
3rd place, bronze medalist(s)	Gabrielle Thomas	Harvard	22.47	
4	Morolake Akinosun	Texas	22.54	(22.533)
5	Tynia Gaither Bahamas	USC	22.54	(22.539)
6	Felicia Brown	Tennessee	22.67	
7	Deanna Hill	USC	22.75	
8	Jasmine Camacho-Quinn	Kentucky	23.07	

==== Women's 400 meters ====
- Only top eight final results shown; no prelims are listed

Rank	Name	University	Time	Notes
1st place, gold medalist(s)	Courtney Okolo	Texas	50.36	
2nd place, silver medalist(s)	Taylor Ellis-Watson	Arkansas	50.86	
3rd place, bronze medalist(s)	Shakima Wimbley	Miami	51.43	
4	Margaret Bamgbose	Notre Dame	51.57	
5	Chrisann Gordon Jamaica	Texas	51.72	
6	Robin Reynolds	Florida	51.84	
7	Jasmine Blocker	Tulane	53.14	
8	Felecia Majors	Tennessee	59.68	

==== Women's 800 meters ====
- Only top eight final results shown; no prelims are listed

Rank	Name	University	Time	Notes
1st place, gold medalist(s)	Raevyn Rogers	Oregon	2:00.75	
2nd place, silver medalist(s)	Olivia Baker	Stanford	2:02.65	
3rd place, bronze medalist(s)	Shea Collinsworth	BYU	2:02.83	
4	Claudia Saunders France	Stanford	2:02.99	
5	Cecilia Barowski	Princeton	2:03.09	(2:03.087)
6	Anima Banks	Duke	2:03.09	(2:03.089)
7	Morgan Schuetz	LSU	2:03.72	
8	Baylee Mires	Washington	2:03.92	

==== Women's 1500 meters ====
- Only top eight final results shown; no prelims are listed

Rank	Name	University	Time	Notes
1st place, gold medalist(s)	Marta Freitas Portugal	Mississippi State	4:09.53	
2nd place, silver medalist(s)	Elise Cranny	Stanford	4:09.54	
3rd place, bronze medalist(s)	Dana Giordano	Dartmouth	4:11.86	
4	Shannon Osika	Michigan	4:12.23	
5	Annie Leblanc	Oregon	4:14.80	
6	Kaela Edwards	Oklahoma State	4:15.14	
7	Annemarie Schwanz	Fresno State	4:15.19	
8	Jaimie Phelan	Michigan	4:15.61	

==== Women's 5000 meters ====
- Only top eight final results shown; no prelims are listed

Rank	Name	University	Time	Notes
1st place, gold medalist(s)	Dominique Scott South Africa	Arkansas	15:57.07	
2nd place, silver medalist(s)	Aurora Dybedokken	Oklahoma State	16:00.81	
3rd place, bronze medalist(s)	Karissa Schweizer	Missouri	16:02.82	
4	Ednah Kurgat	Liberty	16:02.91	
5	Alli Cash	Oregon	16:04.11	
6	Lauren LaRocco	Portland	16:06.47	
7	Regan Rome	William and Mary	16:06.50	
8	Brenna Peloquin	Boise State	16:07.32	

==== Women's 10000 meters ====
- Only top eight final results shown; no prelims are listed

Rank	Name	University	Time	Notes
1st place, gold medalist(s)	Dominique Scott South Africa	Arkansas	32:35.69	
2nd place, silver medalist(s)	Alice Wright United Kingdom	New Mexico	32:46.99	
3rd place, bronze medalist(s)	Hannah Everson	Air Force	32:47.25	
4	Lauren LaRocco	Portland	32:47.30	
5	Chelsea Blaase	Tennessee	32:49.03	
6	Sharon Lokedi Kenya	Kansas	32:49.43	
7	Tara Jameson Ireland	Iona	32:52.92	
8	Brenna Peloquin	Boise State	32:58.78	

==== Women's 100 meters hurdles ====
- Only top eight final results shown; no prelims are listed

Wind: +3.8 mps

Rank	Name	University	Time	Notes
1st place, gold medalist(s)	Jasmine Camacho-Quinn Puerto Rico	Kentucky	12.54	
2nd place, silver medalist(s)	Tobi Amusan Nigeria	UTEP	12.79	
3rd place, bronze medalist(s)	Sasha Wallace	Oregon	12.81	(12.804)
4	Cindy Ofili United Kingdom	Michigan	12.81	(12.810)
5	Alexis Perry	North Carolina St.	12.87	
6	Chanice Chase Canada	LSU	12.90	
7	Danielle Demas	Sam Houston St.	17.10	
-	Pedrya Seymour Bahamas	Illinois	DNF	

==== Women's 400 meters hurdles ====
- Only top eight final results shown; no prelims are listed

Rank	Name	University	Time	Notes
1st place, gold medalist(s)	Shamier Little	Texas A&M	53.51	
2nd place, silver medalist(s)	Kiah Seymour	Kentucky	54.67	
3rd place, bronze medalist(s)	Sage Watson Canada	Arizona	54.85	
4	Autumne Franklin	Harvard	54.91	
5	Chanice Chase Canada	LSU	54.94	
6	Jaide Stepter	USC	55.30	
7	Claudia Francis	Florida	56.39	
8	Kaila Barber	Notre Dame	56.54	

==== Women's 3000 meters steeplechase ====
- Only top eight final results shown; no prelims are listed

Rank	Name	University	Time	Notes
1st place, gold medalist(s)	Courtney Frerichs	New Mexico	9:24.41	
2nd place, silver medalist(s)	Jessica Kamilos	Arkansas	9:41.28	
3rd place, bronze medalist(s)	Elinor Purrier	New Hampshire	9:47.71	
4	Ingeborg Loevnes Norway	Oklahoma State	9:48.57	
5	Devin Clark	Arkansas	9:49.25	
6	Laura Rose Donegan Australia	New Hampshire	9:52.57	
7	Paige Kouba	Harvard	9:54.43	
8	Erin Teschuk Canada	North Dakota State	9:56.71	

==== Women's 4 x 100 meters relay ====
- Only top eight final results shown; no prelims are listed

Rank	University	Time	Notes
1st place, gold medalist(s)	LSU	42.65	
2nd place, silver medalist(s)	USC	42.90	
3rd place, bronze medalist(s)	Oregon	42.91	
4	Texas A&M	42.95	
5	Kentucky	43.02	
6	San Diego State	43.68	
7	Florida	44.11	
8	Tennessee	DNF	

==== Women's 4 x 400 meters relay ====
- Only top eight final results shown; no prelims are listed

Rank	University	Time	Notes
1st place, gold medalist(s)	Texas	3:27.64	
2nd place, silver medalist(s)	Arkansas	3:27.94	
3rd place, bronze medalist(s)	South Carolina	3:29.03	
4	LSU	3:29.82	
5	Florida	3:29.99	
6	Notre Dame	3:31.95	
7	Miami	3:32.24	
8	USC	3:40.61	

==== Women's Long Jump ====
- Only top eight final results shown; no prelims are listed

Rank	Name	University	Distance	Wind	Notes
1st place, gold medalist(s)	Chanice Porter Jamaica	Georgia	6.67 m (21 ft 10 1/2 in)	-0.5	
2nd place, silver medalist(s)	Quanesha Burks	Alabama	6.52 m (21 ft 4 1/2 in)	-0.4	
3rd place, bronze medalist(s)	Taliyah Brooks	Arkansas	6.35 m (20 ft 10 in)	-0.9	
4	Alexis Perry	N.C. State	6.31 m (20 ft 8 1/4 in)	-0.8	
5	Darrielle McQueen	Florida	6.31 m (20 ft 8 1/4 in)	+0.1	
6	Keturah Orji	Georgia	6.29 m (20 ft 7 1/2 in)	+0.3	
7	Gabrielle Farquharson	Rutgers	6.29 m (20 ft 7 1/2 in)	-0.3	
8	Yanis David France	Florida	6.26 m (20 ft 6 1/4 in))	-0.6	

==== Women's Triple Jump ====
- Only top eight final results shown; no prelims are listed

Rank	Name	University	Distance	Wind	Notes
1st place, gold medalist(s)	Keturah Orji	Georgia	14.53 m (47 ft 8 in)	+1.2	NR
2nd place, silver medalist(s)	Simone Charley	Vanderbilt	13.77 m (45 ft 2 in)	+1.8	
3rd place, bronze medalist(s)	Yanis David France	Florida	13.64 m (44 ft 9 in)w	+5.3	
4	Jhoanmy Luque Venezuela	Iowa State	13.37 m (43 ft 10 1/4 in)	+1.1	
5	Tierra Williams	Nebraska	13.37 m (43 ft 10 1/4 in)	+1.8	
6	Natasha Dicks	South Carolina	13.35 m (43 ft 9 1/2 in)	+0.7	
7	Isabella Marten Germany	California	13.3 m (43 ft 7 1/2 in)w	+4.4	
8	Marshay Ryan	Auburn	13.22 m (43 ft 4 1/4 in)w	+3.4	

==== Women's High Jump ====
- Only top eight final results shown; no prelims are listed

Rank	Name	University	Height	Notes
1st place, gold medalist(s)	Kimberly Williamson Jamaica	Kansas State	1.88 m (6 ft 2 in)	
2nd place, silver medalist(s)	Madeline Fagan	Georgia	1.85 m (6 ft 3/4 in)	
3rd place, bronze medalist(s)	Claudia Garcia Jou Spain	Akron	1.82 m (5 ft 11 1/2 in)	
3rd place, bronze medalist(s)	Kaitlin Whitehorn	Dartmouth	1.82 m (5 ft 11 1/2 in)	
5	Erica Bougard	Miss State	1.82 m (5 ft 11 1/2 in)	
6	Loretta Blaut	Cincinnati	1.82 m (5 ft 11 1/2 in)	
7	Chelsie Decoud	Texas State	1.82 m (5 ft 11 1/2 in)	
8	Reka Czuth Hungary	Nebraska	1.82 m (5 ft 11 1/2 in)	

==== Women's Pole Vault ====
- Only top eight final results shown; no prelims are listed

Rank	Name	University	Height	Notes
1st place, gold medalist(s)	Alexis Weeks	Arkansas	4.50 m (14 ft 9 in)	
(silver) (tie)	Alysha Newman Canada	Miami	4.30 m (14 ft 1 1/4 in)	
(silver) (tie)	Morgann LeLeux	Louisiana-Lafayette	4.30 m (14 ft 1 1/4 in)	
4	Sydney Clute	Indiana	4.30 m (14 ft 1 1/4 in)	
5	Megan Clark	Duke	4.30 m (14 ft 1 1/4 in)	
6	Jessica Harter	Purdue	4.20 m (13 ft 9 1/4 in)	
7 (tie)	Kally Long	Texas	4.20 m (13 ft 9 1/4 in)	
7 (tie)	Alyssa Applebee	Missouri	4.20 m (13 ft 9 1/4 in)	
7 (tie)	Caroline Hasse Germany	Akron	4.20 m (13 ft 9 1/4 in)	

==== Women's Shot Put ====
- Only top eight final results shown; no prelims are listed

Rank	Name	University	Distance	Notes
1st place, gold medalist(s)	Raven Saunders	Ole Miss	19.33 m (63 ft 5 in)	
2nd place, silver medalist(s)	Chase Ealey	Oklahoma State	17.99 m (59 ft 1/4 in)	
3rd place, bronze medalist(s)	Jessica Woodard	Oklahoma	17.88 m (58 ft 7 3/4 in)	
4	Kelsey Card	Wisconsin	17.65 m (57 ft 10 3/4 in)	
5	Brittany Mann	Oregon	17.49 m (57 ft 4 1/2 in)	
6	Christina Hillman	Iowa State	17.48 m (57 ft 4 in)	
7	Lloydricia Cameron	Florida	17.01 m (55 ft 9 1/2 in)	
8	Nikki Okwelogu Nigeria	Harvard	16.91 m (55 ft 5 1/2 in)	

==== Women's Discus throw ====
- Only top eight final results shown; no prelims are listed

Rank	Name	University	Distance	Notes
1st place, gold medalist(s)	Kelsey Card	Wisconsin	63.52 m (208 ft 4 in)	
2nd place, silver medalist(s)	Kellion Knibb Jamaica	Florida State	61.44 m (201 ft 6 in)	NR
3rd place, bronze medalist(s)	Valarie Allman	Stanford	61.42 m (201 ft 6 in)	
4	Shadae Lawrence Jamaica	Kansas State	61.18 m (200 ft 8 in)	
5	Katelyn Daniels	Michigan State	60.54 m (198 ft 7 in)	
6	Shelbi Vaughan	Texas A&M	59.32 m (194 ft 7 in)	
7	Tera Novy	USC	57.70 m (189 ft 3 in)	
8	Maggie Ewen	Arizona State	54.66 m (179 ft 3 in)	

==== Women's Javelin Throw ====
- Only top eight final results shown; no prelims are listed

Rank	Name	University	Distance	Notes
1st place, gold medalist(s)	Maggie Malone	Texas A&M	62.19 m (204 ft 0 in)	
2nd place, silver medalist(s)	Hannah Carson	Texas Tech	61.20 m (200 ft 9 in)	
3rd place, bronze medalist(s)	Audrey Malone	Texas A&M	57.06 m (187 ft 2 in)	
4	Nicolle Murphy	Minnesota	55.84 m (183 ft 2 in)	
5	Marija Vucenovic Serbia	Florida	55.29 m (181 ft 4 in)	
6	Rebekah Wales	LSU	53.96 m (177 ft 0 in)	
7	Mackenzie Little Australia	Stanford	53.65 m (176 ft 0 in)	
8	Elizabeth Herrs	Oklahoma	52.06 m (170 ft 9 in)	

==== Women's Hammer Throw ====
- Only top eight final results shown; no prelims are listed

Rank	Name	University	Distance	Notes
1st place, gold medalist(s)	DeAnna Price	Southern Illinois	71.53 m (234 ft 8 in)	
2nd place, silver medalist(s)	Sara Savatović Serbia	Kansas State	65.61 m (215 ft 3 in)	
3rd place, bronze medalist(s)	Marthaline Cooper	Winthrop	65.21 m (213 ft 11 in)	
4	Julia Reedy	Oklahoma	65.06 m (213 ft 5 in)	
5	Maggie Ewen	Arizona State	63.61 m (208 ft 8 in)	
6	Lyndsey Thorpe	Minnesota	63.30 m (207 ft 8 in)	
7	Nakel McClinton	Indiana	62.91 m (206 ft 4 in)	
8	Annette Echikunwoke	Cincinnati	62.01 m (203 ft 5 in)	

==== Women's Heptathlon ====
- Only top eight final results shown; no prelims are listed

Rank	Name	University	Points	Notes
1st place, gold medalist(s)	Kendell Williams	Georgia	6225	
2nd place, silver medalist(s)	Erica Bougard	Miss State	6088	
3rd place, bronze medalist(s)	Akela Jones	Kansas State	6063	
4	Alex Gochenour	Arkansas	5962	
5	Georgia Ellenwood	Wisconsin	5935	
6	Payton Stumbaugh	Arkansas	5868	
7	Jess Lehman	Minnesota	5835	
8	Paige Knodle	Northern Iowa	5833	

== Standings ==
=== Men ===
- Only top ten teams shown

Rank	University	Score	Notes
1st place, gold medalist(s)	Florida	62.0	
2nd place, silver medalist(s)	Arkansas	56.0	
3rd place, bronze medalist(s)	Texas A&M	50.0	
4	Oregon	48.0	
5	LSU	41.0	
6	Tennessee	30.0	
7	Virginia	20.0	
8	Virginia Tech	19.0	
9	Mississippi State	18.0	
10 (tie)	Nebraska	17.0	
10 (tie)	Houston	17.0	

=== Women ===
- Only top ten teams shown

Rank	University	Score	Notes
1st place, gold medalist(s)	Arkansas	72.0	
2nd place, silver medalist(s)	Oregon	62.0	
3rd place, bronze medalist(s)	Georgia	41.0	
4	Texas	36.0	
5	Texas A&M	35.0	
6	LSU	31.0	
7 (tie)	Kansas State	29.0	
7 (tie)	Stanford	29.0	
9 (tie)	USC	28.0	
9 (tie)	Florida	28.0	

== See also ==
- NCAA Men's Division I Outdoor Track and Field Championships
- NCAA Women's Division I Outdoor Track and Field Championships
