= Quanesha Burks =

American long jumper (born 1995)

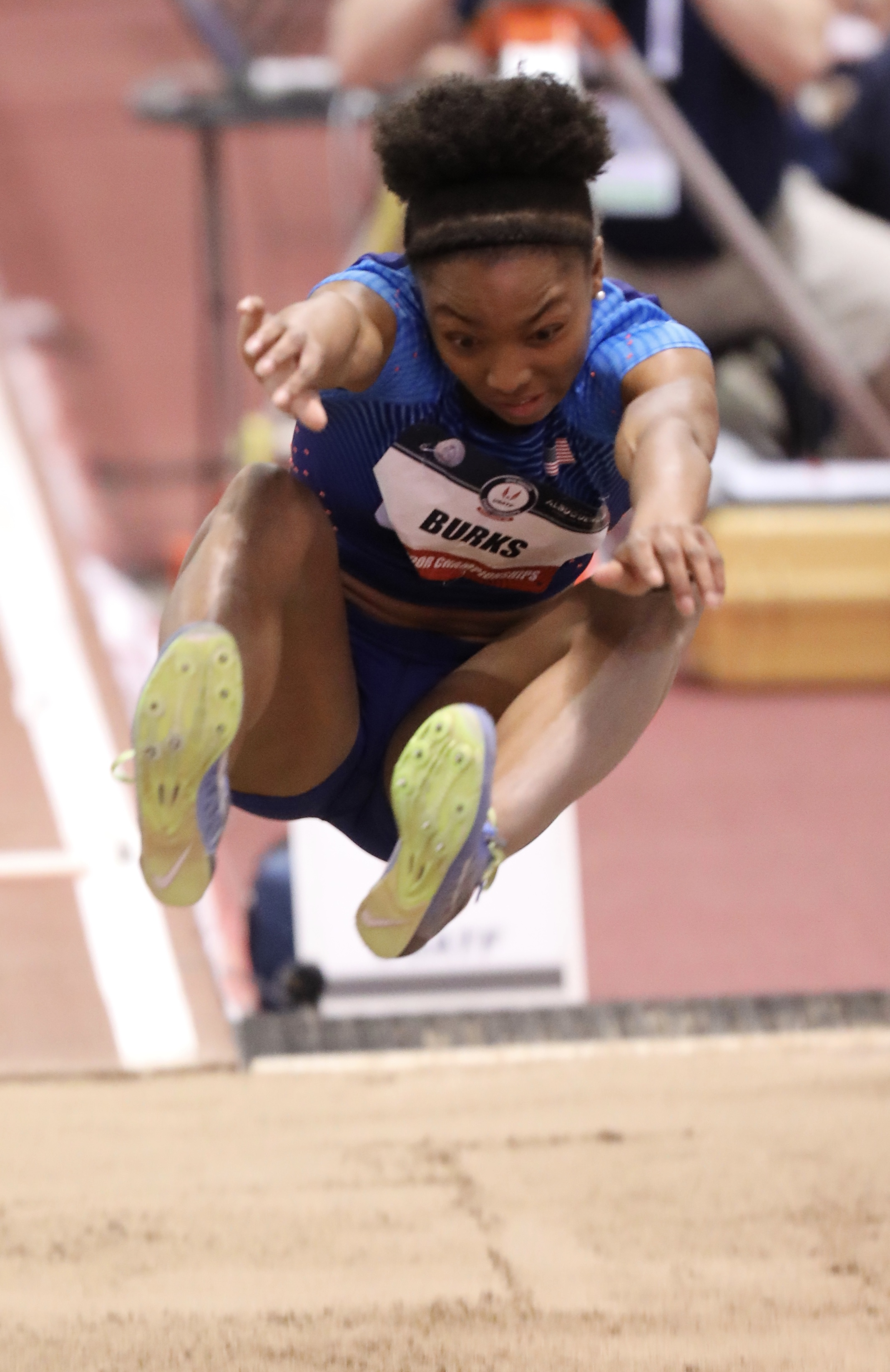
- Burks in 2018

Personal information
- Born: 15 March 1995 (age 31) Ozark, Alabama, United States

Sport
- Sport: Track and field
- Event: Long jump
Medal record
Representing United States
NACAC Championships
| Gold medal – first place | 2015 San José | Long jump |
| Gold medal – first place | 2022 Freeport | Long jump |

Quanesha Burks (born March 15, 1995) is an American track and field athlete who mainly competes as a long jumper. She represented her country at the 2015 Pan American Games and the 2017 World Championships in Athletics. She was the gold medalist at the regional 2015 NACAC Championships in Athletics. Collegiately, she competed for Alabama Crimson Tide and was the 2015 NCAA Division I champion in long jump.

== Career ==
Born to Lesha Dobbins in Ozark, Alabama, she attended Hartselle High School and went on to study at University of Alabama. Burks has four younger siblings; two brothers and two sisters. While a high school student, she took up track and performed well, going on to place third in the triple jump at the 2012 USATF Junior Olympics and winning a 100-meter dash/long jump/triple jump triple at the 2013 state championships.

=== College ===
Burks competed for the Alabama Crimson Tide where she was a multiple-time Southeastern Conference champion and multiple-time NCAA champion, including being Alabama's first women's long jump champion. In college, she also competed in the 100 meter dash and 4x100 relay. Her first NCAA long jump title came at the 2015 NCAA Division I Outdoor Track and Field Championships. She was runner-up to Jamaica's Chanice Porter at the 2016 NCAA Outdoor Championships and also took second at the 2017 NCAA Division I Indoor Track and Field Championships after Sha'Keela Saunders.

=== Professional ===
Burks made her international debut at the age of nineteen, competing in the long jump at the 2014 World Junior Championships in Athletics, where she placed fifth. A senior gold medal came at the 2015 NACAC Championships in Athletics, where she set the championship record at 6.93 m. She managed eighth place in the final at the 2015 Pan American Games, but took a second regional gold at the 2016 NACAC Under-23 Championships in Athletics, breaking the championship record with a jump of 6.74 m. After a fourth-place finish at the 2017 USA Outdoor Track and Field Championships, her global senior debut came at the 2017 World Championships in Athletics, though she did not make it beyond the qualifying round.

She was third at the 2018 PSD Bank Meeting on the IAAF World Indoor Tour, then finished second to Brittney Reese at the 2018 USA Indoor Track and Field Championships to earn qualification to the 2018 IAAF World Indoor Championships where she finished 4th.

== International competitions ==
Representing the United States
| Year | Competition | Venue | Position | Event | Notes |
|---|---|---|---|---|---|
| 2014 | World Junior Championships | Eugene, United States | 5th | Long jump | 6.04 m |
| 2015 | NACAC Championships | San José, Costa Rica | 1st | Long jump | 6.93 m CR |
| 2015 | Pan American Games | Toronto, Canada | 8th | Long jump | 6.47 m |
| 2016 | NACAC Under-23 Championships | San Salvador, El Salvador | 1st | Long jump | 6.74 m CR |
| 2017 | World Championships | London, United Kingdom | 14th (q) | Long jump | 6.44 m |
| 2018 | World Indoor Championships | Birmingham, United Kingdom | 4th | Long jump | 6.81 m |
| 2018 | NACAC Championships | Toronto, Canada | 2nd | Long jump | 6.59 m |
| 2021 | Olympic Games | Tokyo, Japan | 13th (q) | Long jump | 6.56 m |
| 2022 | World Indoor Championships | Belgrade, Serbia | 5th | Long jump | 6.77 m |
| 2022 | World Championships | Eugene, United States | 4th | Long jump | 6.88 m |
| 2022 | NACAC Championships | Freeport, Bahamas | 1st | Long jump | 6.75 m |
| 2023 | World Championships | Budapest, Hungary | 16th (q) | Long jump | 6.57 m |
| 2025 | World Championships | Tokyo, Japan | 8th | Long jump | 6.60 m |

== National titles ==
- NCAA Outdoor Championships
  - Long jump: 2015

== Personal life ==
Burks grew up in poverty. She worked at McDonald's as a high school student to help pay for her grandmother's car insurance.
