= KeAndre Bates =

American track and field athlete (b. 1996)

Personal information
- Nationality: American
- Born: May 24, 1996 (age 30) Temple, Texas
- Height: 1.80 m (5 ft 11 in)

Sport
- Sport: Track and field
- Events: Triple jump; Long jump
- College team: University of Florida
- Turned pro: 2018
- Coached by: Nic Petersen
- Retired: 2020

Achievements and titles
- Personal bests: Outdoor: Long jump – 8.32 m (27 ft 3 1/2 in) (Wind: +3.6 m/s) (2016); Long jump – 8.11 m (26 ft 7 1/4 in) (Wind: +1.0 m/s) (2016); Triple jump – 17.16 m (56 ft 3 1/2 in) (Wind: +1.0 m/s) (2018); 100 meters – 10.60 (Wind: +4.4 m/s) (2017); 4 × 100 meters relay – 39.07 (2017); High jump – 2.05 m (6 ft 8 1/2 in) (2014); Indoor: Triple jump – 16.81 m (55 ft 1 3/4 in) (2017); Long jump – 8.04 m (26 ft 4 1/2 in) (2017); High jump – 1.99 m (6 ft 6 1/4 in) (2014)
Medal record
Men's athletics
Representing the United States
NACAC Championships in Athletics
Bronze medal – third place	2018 Toronto	Triple Jump
NACAC Under-23 Championships in Athletics
Silver medal – second place	2016 San Salvador	Long Jump
2015 Pan American Junior Athletics Championships
Bronze medal – third place	2015 Edmonton	Long jump
IAAF World Youth Championships in Athletics
	2013 Donetsk	Triple Jump

KeAndre Bates (born May 24, 1996) is an American track and field athlete who competes in the triple jump with a personal record of 17.16 m (56 ft 3 1/2 in) and Long jump 8.32 m (27 ft 3 1/2 in). Bates is a 3-time NCAA champion, 14-time NCAA Division I All-American and 3-time SEC champion. Bates represented United States at 2013 World Youth Championships in Athletics, 2015 Pan American Junior Athletics Championships, 2016 NACAC Under-23 Championships, and 2018 NACAC Championships.

== Career ==
Bates earned his place among World's top triple jumpers before graduation from Florida. Bates earned fourteen NCAA Division I All-American as a college student-athlete. He earned an athletic scholarship to attended University of Florida and competed for the Florida Gators men's track and field.

Year	Competition	Venue	Position	Event	Notes
Representing United States
2018	2018 NACAC Championships	Toronto Canada	3rd	Triple jump	16.58 m (54 ft 5 in) (Wind: -0.2 m/s)
2018	USA Outdoor Track and Field Championships	Des Moines, Iowa	3rd	Triple jump	17.16 m (56 ft 4 in) (Wind: +1.0 m/s)
2018	USA Outdoor Track and Field Championships	Des Moines, Iowa	9th	Long jump	7.71 m (25 ft 4 in) (Wind: +3.2 m/s)
2018	2018 NCAA Division I Outdoor Track and Field Championships	University of Oregon	3rd	Triple jump	16.63 m (54 ft 7 in) (Wind: -0.0 m/s)
2018	2018 NCAA Division I Outdoor Track and Field Championships	University of Oregon	7th	Long jump	7.86 m (25 ft 9 in) (Wind: +0.5 m/s)
2018	SEC Outdoor Track and Field Championships	University of Tennessee	3rd	Triple jump	16.23 m (53 ft 3 in) (Wind: +1.3 m/s)
2018	SEC Outdoor Track and Field Championships	University of Tennessee	4th	Long jump	8.00 m (26 ft 3 in) (Wind: +3.5 m/s)
2018	2018 NCAA Division I Indoor Track and Field Championships	Texas A&M University	2nd	Triple jump	16.67 m (54 ft 8 in)
2018	2018 NCAA Division I Indoor Track and Field Championships	Texas A&M University	6th	Long jump	7.90 m (25 ft 11 in)
2018	SEC Indoor Track and Field Championships	Texas A&M University	3rd	Triple jump	15.82 m (51 ft 11 in)
2018	SEC Indoor Track and Field Championships	Texas A&M University	7th	Long jump	7.61 m (25 ft 0 in)
2017	USA Outdoor Track and Field Championships	Sacramento, California	17th	Triple jump	14.64 m (48 ft 0 in) (Wind: +2.7 m/s)
2017	USA Outdoor Track and Field Championships	Sacramento, California	6th	Long jump	8.14 m (26 ft 8 in) (Wind: +2.9 m/s)
2017	2017 NCAA Division I Outdoor Track and Field Championships	University of Oregon	1st	Triple jump	16.76 m (55 ft 0 in) (Wind: +2.4 m/s)
2017	2017 NCAA Division I Outdoor Track and Field Championships	University of Oregon	1st	Long jump	8.05 m (26 ft 5 in) (Wind: -1.1 m/s)
2017	2017 NCAA Division I Outdoor Track and Field Championships	University of Oregon	11th	4 × 100 meter relay	39.07
2017	SEC Outdoor Track and Field Championships	University of Missouri	1st	Triple jump	16.63 m (54 ft 7 in) (Wind: +2.3 m/s)
2017	SEC Outdoor Track and Field Championships	University of Missouri	2nd	Long jump	8.03 m (26 ft 4 in) (Wind: +1.0 m/s)
2017	2017 NCAA Division I Indoor Track and Field Championships	Texas A&M University	2nd	Triple jump	16.62 m (54 ft 6 in)
2017	2017 NCAA Division I Indoor Track and Field Championships	Texas A&M University	1st	Long jump	8.04 m (26 ft 5 in)
2017	SEC Indoor Track and Field Championships	Vanderbilt University	1st	Triple jump	16.81 m (55 ft 2 in)
2017	SEC Indoor Track and Field Championships	Vanderbilt University	1st	Long jump	8.01 m (26 ft 3 in)
2016	2016 NACAC Under-23 Championships in Athletics	San Salvador, El Salvador	3rd	Long jump	7.77 m (25 ft 6 in) (Wind: +3.6 m/s)
2016	USA Olympic Trials	Eugene, Oregon	9th	Triple jump	16.50 m (54 ft 2 in) (Wind: +1.2 m/s)
2016	USA Olympic Trials	Eugene, Oregon	6th	Long jump	8.32 m (27 ft 4 in) (Wind: +3.6 m/s)
2016	2016 NCAA Division I Outdoor Track and Field Championships	University of Oregon	2nd	Triple jump	16.73 m (54 ft 11 in) (Wind: +3.2 m/s)
2016	2016 NCAA Division I Outdoor Track and Field Championships	University of Oregon	3rd	Long jump	7.82 m (25 ft 8 in) (Wind: -0.7 m/s)
2016	SEC Outdoor Track and Field Championships	University of Alabama, Tuscaloosa	7th	Triple jump	15.72 m (51 ft 7 in) (Wind: -0.5 m/s)
2016	SEC Outdoor Track and Field Championships	University of Alabama, Tuscaloosa	3rd	Long jump	7.78 m (25 ft 6 in) (Wind: 0.6 m/s)
2016	2016 NCAA Division I Indoor Track and Field Championships	University of Alabama at Birmingham	4th	Long jump	7.73 m (25 ft 4 in)
2016	SEC Indoor Track and Field Championships	University of Arkansas	7th	Triple jump	15.66 m (51 ft 5 in)
2016	SEC Indoor Track and Field Championships	University of Arkansas	8th	Long jump	7.41 m (24 ft 4 in)
2015	2015 Pan American Junior Athletics Championships	Edmonton, Alberta	3rd	Long jump	7.54 m (24 ft 9 in) (Wind: +1.6 m/s)
2015	US Junior U 20 Outdoor Track and Field Championships	University of Oregon	5th	Triple jump	15.07 m (49 ft 5 in) (Wind: +1.5 m/s)
2015	US Junior U 20 Outdoor Track and Field Championships	University of Oregon	1st	Long jump	7.73 m (25 ft 4 in) (Wind: +3.4 m/s)
2015	SEC Outdoor Track and Field Championships	Mississippi State University	8th	Triple jump	15.80 m (51 ft 10 in) (Wind: +2.7 m/s)
2015	SEC Outdoor Track and Field Championships	Mississippi State University	3rd	Long jump	7.97 m (26 ft 2 in) (Wind: -3.0 m/s)
2015	2015 NCAA Division I Indoor Track and Field Championships	University of Arkansas	7th	Triple jump	16.42 m (53 ft 10 in)
2015	2015 NCAA Division I Indoor Track and Field Championships	University of Arkansas	3rd	Long jump	8.02 m (26 ft 4 in)
2015	SEC Indoor Track and Field Championships	University of Kentucky	5th	Triple jump	16.06 m (52 ft 8 in)
2015	SEC Indoor Track and Field Championships	University of Kentucky	5th	Long jump	7.58 m (24 ft 10 in)
2014	2014 USA U 20 Junior Outdoor Track and Field Championships	University of Oregon	3rd	Triple jump	15.38 m (50 ft 6 in) (Wind: +1.3 m/s)
2014	2014 USA U 20 Junior Outdoor Track and Field Championships	University of Oregon	8th	Long jump	7.45 m (24 ft 5 in) (Wind: +2.0 m/s)
2014	New Balance Nationals Outdoor	North Carolina A&T State University	1st	Triple jump	15.34 m (50 ft 4 in) (Wind: +2.2 m/s)
2014	New Balance Nationals Outdoor	North Carolina A&T State University	5th	Long jump	7.10 m (23 ft 4 in) (Wind: +1.5 m/s)
2014	Texas Relays	University of Texas at Austin	1st	Triple jump	15.34 m (50 ft 4 in) (Wind: +2.2 m/s)
2014	Texas Relays	University of Texas at Austin	4th	Long jump	7.11 m (23 ft 4 in) (Wind: +1.5 m/s)
2014	Texas Relays	University of Texas at Austin	8th	High jump	2.00 m (6 ft 7 in)
2014	New Balance Nationals Indoor	Fort Washington Avenue Armory	2nd	Triple jump	15.28 m (50 ft 2 in)
2014	New Balance Nationals Indoor	Fort Washington Avenue Armory	7th	Long jump	7.04 m (23 ft 1 in)
2014	New Balance Nationals Indoor	Fort Washington Avenue Armory	9th	High jump	1.99 m (6 ft 6 in)
2013	USATF National Junior Olympic Track & Field Championships	North Carolina A&T State University	1st	Triple jump	15.31 m (50 ft 3 in) (Wind: +1.5 m/s)
2013	USATF National Junior Olympic Track & Field Championships	North Carolina A&T State University	3rd	Long jump	7.12 m (23 ft 4 in) (Wind: +0.5 m/s)
2013	USATF National Junior Olympic Track & Field Championships	North Carolina A&T State University	19th	400 metres hurdles	55.82
2013	2013 World Youth Championships in Athletics	Donetsk, Ukraine	9th	Triple jump	15.45 m (50 ft 8 in) (Wind: +1.4 m/s)
2013	USA World Youth Trials	Southern Illinois University Edwardsville	4th	Long jump	6.93 m (22 ft 9 in) (Wind: +2.1 m/s)
2013	USA World Youth Trials	Southern Illinois University Edwardsville	1st	Triple jump	14.99 m (49 ft 2 in) (Wind: +1.9 m/s)
2012	USATF National Junior Olympic Track & Field Championships	Baltimore, Maryland	1st	Triple jump	14.47 m (47 ft 6 in) (Wind: +1.4 m/s)
2012	USA Junior Outdoor Track and Field Championships	Bloomington, Indiana	17th	Triple jump	14.32 m (47 ft 0 in) (Wind: +0.4 m/s)

== Personal Biography ==
KeAndre Bates was born in Temple, Texas, United States, and attended Burges High School'14 as a University Interscholastic League Texas 4A two sport athlete (football and Track and Field) before committing to Florida Gators track and field.
