= Raven Saunders =

American track and field athlete (born 1996)

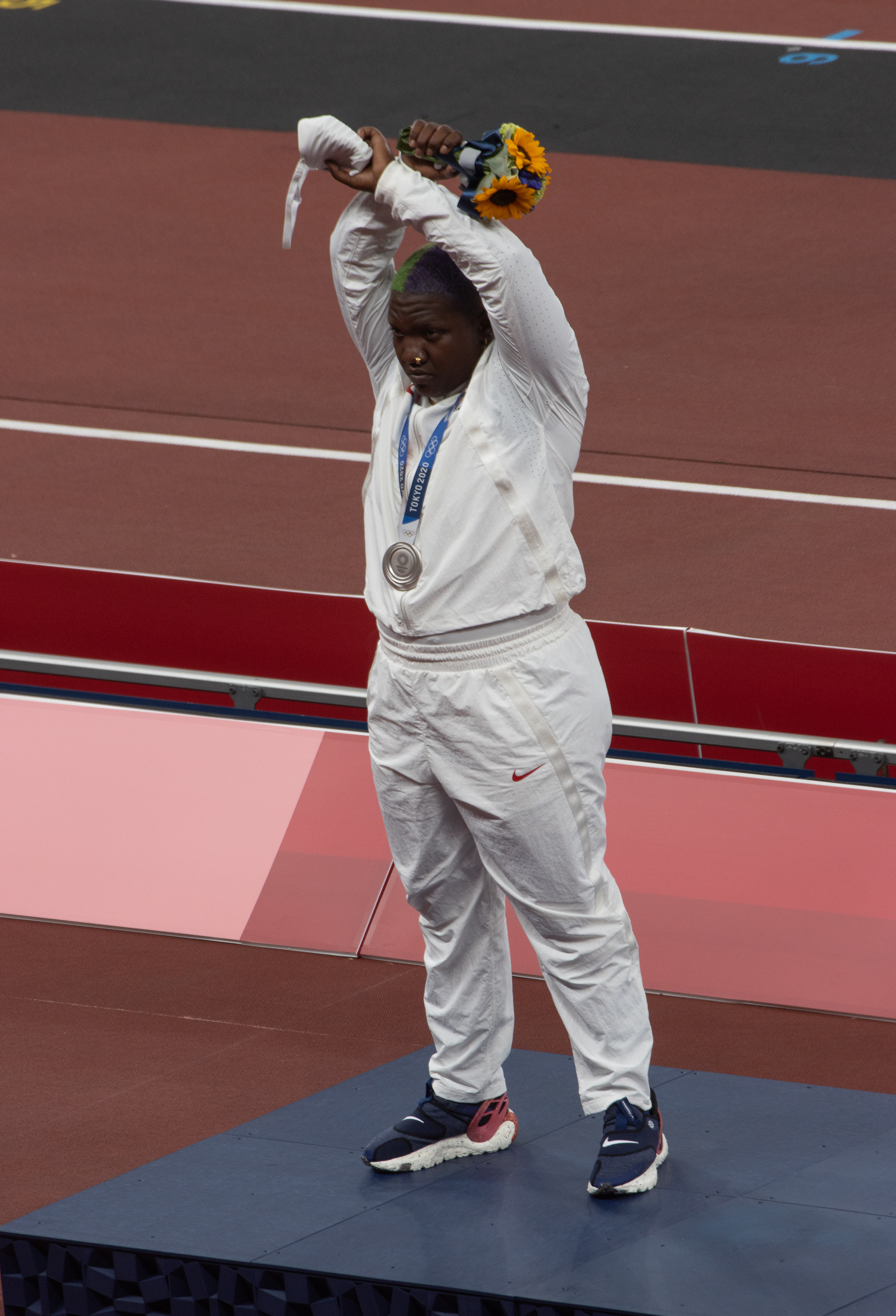
- Saunders on the podium at the Tokyo 2020 Olympic Games

Personal information
- Born: May 15, 1996 (age 30) Charleston, South Carolina, U.S.
- Height: 5 ft 5 in (165 cm)

Sport
- Country: United States
- Sport: Athletics (track and field)
- Events: Shot put; Discus
- College team: Southern Illinois University Salukis, Ole Miss Rebels
- Turned pro: 2018
- Coached by: Herbert Johnson (2011–2014); Connie Price-Smith (2015–2017)

Achievements and titles
- Highest world ranking: 3rd (shot put, 2018)
- Personal bests: Shot put: 19.96 m (65 ft 5 3/4 in) (2021); Discus: 56.85 m (186 ft 6 in) (2016); Hammer: 57.97 m (190 ft 2 1/4 in) (2016)
Medal record
Women's athletics
Representing the United States
Olympic Games
| Silver medal – second place | 2020 Tokyo | Shot put |
World Junior Championships
| Silver medal – second place | 2014 Eugene | Shot Put |
Pan American Junior Championships
| Gold medal – first place | 2015 Edmonton | Shot Put |
NACAC U23 Championships
| Gold medal – first place | 2016 San Salvador | Shot Put |
Representing Americas
Continental Cup
| Silver medal – second place | 2018 Ostrava | Shot Put |
- Updated on July 12, 2025

Raven Saunders (born May 15, 1996), also known as "Hulk," is an American track and field athlete who competes in shot put. They represented the United States in shot put at the Summer Olympics in 2016, 2021, and 2024, medaling in silver at the pandemic-delayed 2020 Tokyo Olympics. As a student at Southern Illinois University and University of Mississippi, they won four NCAA collegiate titles in shot put, both indoor and outdoor. They were a world junior silver medalist in 2014 and the Pan American junior champion in 2015.

== Early life ==
Raven Saunders was born on May 15, 1996, in Charleston, South Carolina. They have a younger sister.

Saunders is a 2014 graduate of Burke High School in Charleston, South Carolina, where they competed in track and field. Saunders went on to attend Southern Illinois University (SIU) in Carbondale, Illinois, before transferring to the University of Mississippi in University, Mississippi, to compete for the Ole Miss Rebels track team.

== Career ==
=== 2011–2014: High school and junior career ===
Saunders started throwing shot put and discus as a ninth grader at Burke High School. Their coach, Herbert Johnson, became a father figure to Saunders.

During their senior year in March 2014, Saunders broke the national high school indoor record for the shot put with a mark of 17.27 m (56 ft 7 3/4 in); in April 2014, they broke the outdoor record for the shot put with a mark of 17.29 m (56 ft 8 1/2 in). They were selected as the Gatorade Female Track and Field Athlete of the Year for their efforts.

Saunders placed first at the 2014 US Junior Championships, and made their international debut at the 2014 World Junior Championships in Athletics in Eugene, Oregon and took the silver medal behind Guo Tianqian of China (who was Asian champion one year later). Saunders raised funds through the internet in order to attend the meeting, which was nearly 3,000 miles away from their hometown in South Carolina.

=== 2015: Start of NCAA career at SIU, Pan Am Junior Champion ===
Saunders started their NCAA career at Southern Illinois University (SIU), where they won shot put titles at the 2015 Missouri Valley Conference Indoor Track and Field Championships, 2015 NCAA Indoor Championships, 2015 Missouri Valley Conference Outdoor Track and Field Championships, and the 2015 NCAA Outdoor Championships.

Saunders was the first American junior athlete to throw beyond 18 meters. They continued to improve their American junior records and broke the Missouri Valley Conference record.

Saunders placed 8th at the 2015 USA Outdoor Track and Field Championships and topped the podium at the 2015 Pan American Junior Athletics Championships, beating the runner-up by over 2.5 meters with a throw of 18.27 m (59 ft 11 1/4 in), a new Pan American Junior Championship record.

=== 2016: Transfer to Ole Miss, Rio Olympics ===
As a sophomore, Saunders transferred to the University of Mississippi and competed for the Ole Miss Rebels track team. They won shot put titles at the 2016 Southeastern Conference Track and Field Championships (both indoor and outdoor) and the 2016 NCAA Outdoor Championships, and placed 12th at 2016 NCAA Indoor Championships.

Saunders broke the 23-year-old outdoor championship record with their shot put throw of 19.33 m (63 ft 5 in) in 2016.

Saunders successfully made their first Olympic team with a throw of 19.24 m (63 ft 1 1/4 in) at the 2016 United States Olympic Trials, coming second only to Michelle Carter, who would go on to become the first American woman to win the gold medal in shot put at the Rio Olympics.

Saunders competed at the 2016 Summer Olympics in Rio de Janeiro, placing 5th with a throw of 19.35 m (63 ft 5 3/4 in).

=== 2018–2020: Leaving Ole Miss, turning pro, injuries ===
In February 2018, Saunders announced they were leaving Ole Miss due to “personal and medical issues,” but that they intended to return to complete their degree.

In April 2018, Saunders turned professional, launching this new phase of their career as a shot putter at the War Eagle Invitational at Auburn University with a throw of 19.56 m (64 ft 2 in).

In June 2018, Saunders announced that they had signed with Nike, the same week that they finished third in shot put at the USA Outdoor Track and Field Championships with a throw of 18.74 m (61 ft 5 3/4 in).

At the end of the 2018 season, Saunders had surgery on their elbow, followed by hip surgery in May 2019, taking them out of competition for the rest of 2019. Saunders returned to competition in early 2020, taking part in only two meets before the COVID-19 pandemic canceled the rest of the season.

=== 2021–2022: Tokyo Olympics, podium gesture ===
In June 2021, Saunders placed second in shot put at the U.S. Track and Field Olympic Trials, with a personal best of 19.96 m (65 ft 6 in).

On August 1, 2021, at the pandemic-delayed Tokyo Olympics, Saunders won the silver medal in shot put, with a throw of 19.79 m (64 ft 11 in).

On the podium during the medal ceremony, Saunders raised their arms above their head and formed an "X" with their wrists, later explaining: “It’s the intersection of where all people who are oppressed meet.“ As a result, the IOC launched a probe to whether the gesture violated Olympic rules, which prohibited athletes from "[any] kind of demonstration or political, religious or racial propaganda" in any Olympic site, including playing fields and podiums.

The United States Olympic Committee defended Saunders' gesture, stating that it did not breach its rules as it was a "peaceful expression in support of racial and social justice that was respectful of [their] competitors."

On August 3, it was announced that Saunders’ mother Clarissa had died at an Olympics watch party in Florida for athletes’ families. The next day, the IOC suspended its investigation into Saunders' gesture on the podium.

In October 2021, Saunders had another surgery on their hip. Nine months later, they returned to compete at the 2022 USA Outdoor Track and Field Championships, placing 4th in shot put with a throw of 18.95 m (62 ft 2 in) and missing out on competing at the 2022 World Athletics Championships.

Disappointed with their performance, Saunders announced in July 2022 that they would be taking the rest of the year off in order to fully recuperate from hip surgery, with the intention of returning for indoor meets in early 2023 and the goal of qualifying for the 2023 World Athletics Championship.

=== 2023: Anti-doping rule violation ===
Saunders served an 18-month competition ban from August 2022 to February 2024 issued by United States Anti-Doping Agency (USADA) for three "whereabouts" failures during a 12-month period, in which they either missed drug testing or failed to submit paperwork indicating where they could be found.

=== 2024: Paris Olympics ===
At the 2024 Paris Olympics, Saunders qualified for the shot put final with a throw of 18.62 m (61 ft 1 in). In the final, Saunders finished 11th with a top throw of 17.79 m (58 ft 4 1/4 in).

=== 2025: Second anti-doping rule violation ===
In September 2025, the USADA announced that Saunders had accepted a second suspension of 2 1/2 years for additional "whereabouts" violations. Their suspension was retroactive to December 2024.

== Personal life ==
Saunders is non-binary and queer, having come out to their mother as queer in the third grade.

Saunders has been outspoken about their struggles with depression and suicidal ideation. They have worked as an advocate for racial justice, mental health, and animal rights for bovines, especially bulls.

=== International competitions ===
Representing the United States
| Year | Competition | Venue | Position | Event | Result | Notes |
|---|---|---|---|---|---|---|
| 2014 | World Junior Championships | Eugene, Oregon | 2nd | Shot put | 16.63 m (54 ft 6 1/2 in) | —N/a |
| 2015 | Pan American Junior Championships | Edmonton, Canada | 1st | Shot put | 18.27 m (59 ft 11 1/4 in) | CR |
| 2016 | NACAC U23 Championships | San Salvador, El Salvador | 1st | Shot put | 18.49 m (60 ft 7 3/4 in) | —N/a |
| 2016 | Olympic Games | Rio de Janeiro, Brazil | 5th | Shot put | 19.35 m (63 ft 5 3/4 in) | SB |
| 2017 | World Championships | London, United Kingdom | 10th | Shot put | 17.86 m (58 ft 7 in) | —N/a |
| 2018 | Continental Cup | Ostrava, Czech Republic | 2nd | Shot put | 19.74 m (64 ft 9 in) | SB |
| 2021 | Olympic Games | Tokyo, Japan | 2nd | Shot put | 19.79 m (64 ft 11 in) | —N/a |
| 2024 | Olympic Games | Paris, France | 11th | Shot put | 17.79 m (58 ft 4 1/4 in) | —N/a |

=== National competitions ===
| Year | Competition | Venue | Position | Event | Result | Notes |
|---|---|---|---|---|---|---|
| 2014 | USA Junior Championships | Eugene, Oregon | 1st | Shot put | 17.02 m (55 ft 10 in) | —N/a |
| 2015 | USA Championships | Eugene, Oregon | 8th | Shot put | 17.85 m (58 ft 6 3/4 in) | —N/a |
| 2015 | USA Junior Championships | Eugene, Oregon | 1st | Shot put | 17.01 m (55 ft 9 1/2 in) | —N/a |
| 2016 | United States Olympic Trials | Eugene, Oregon | 2nd | Shot put | 19.24 m (63 ft 1 1/4 in) | —N/a |
| 2017 | USA Championships | Sacramento, California | 1st | Shot put | 19.76 m (64 ft 9 3/4 in) | SB |
| 2018 | USA Championships | Des Moines, Iowa | 3rd | Shot put | 18.74 m (61 ft 5 3/4 in) | —N/a |
| 2021 | United States Olympic Trials | Eugene, Oregon | 2nd | Shot put | 19.96 m (65 ft 5 3/4 in) | PB SB |
| 2022 | USA Championships | Eugene, Oregon | 4th | Shot put | 18.95 m (62 ft 2 in) | SB |
| 2024 | United States Olympic Trials | Eugene, Oregon | 2nd | Shot put | 19.90 m (65 ft 3 1/4 in) | SB |

=== NCAA competitions ===
Representing Southern Illinois University and University of Mississippi
| Year | Competition | Venue | Position | Event | Result | Team | Notes |
|---|---|---|---|---|---|---|---|
| 2015 | Division I Indoor Championships | Fayetteville, Arkansas | 1st | Shot put | 18.62 m (61 ft 1 in) | Southern Illinois University | SB |
| 2015 | Division I Championships | Eugene, Oregon | 1st | Shot put | 18.35 m (60 ft 2 1/4 in) | Southern Illinois University | —N/a |
| 2016 | Division I Indoor Championships | Birmingham, Alabama | 12th | Shot put | 16.59 m (54 ft 5 in) | University of Mississippi | —N/a |
| 2016 | Division I Championships | Eugene, Oregon | 1st | Shot put | 19.33 m (63 ft 5 in) | University of Mississippi | —N/a |
| 2017 | Division I Indoor Championships | College Station, Texas | 1st | Shot put | 19.56 m (64 ft 2 in) | University of Mississippi | CR |
| 2017 | Division I Championships | Eugene, Oregon | 4th | Shot put | 17.47 m (57 ft 3 3/4 in) | University of Mississippi | —N/a |
