= 2016 NACAC U23 Championships in Athletics =

IX NACAC Under-23 Championships in Athletics
- Dates: July 15–17
- Host city: San Salvador, El Salvador
- Venue: Estadio Jorge "Mágico" González
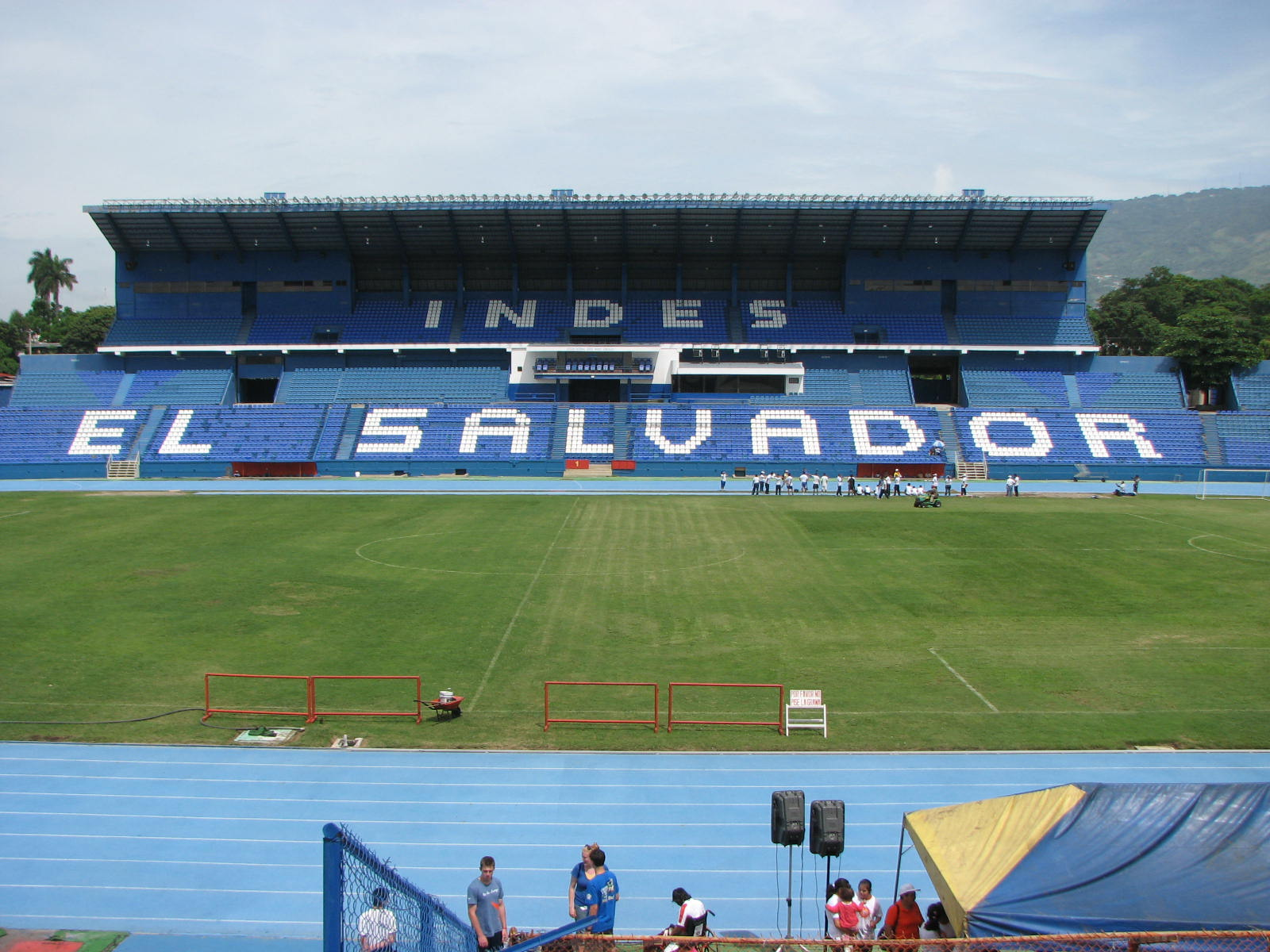
- Level: U-23
- Events: 44
- Participation: 305 athletes from 28 nations
- Records set: 12 CRs

The 9th NACAC Under-23 Championships in Athletics were held at Jorge "El Magico" Gonzalez National Stadium in San Salvador, El Salvador from July 15–17, 2016.

== Medal summary ==
Medal winners and complete results can be found.

=== Men ===
Event	Gold		Silver		Bronze	
100 metres (wind: -0.9 m/s)	Kendal Williams (USA)	10.23	Stanly del Carmen (DOM)	10.37	Levi Cadogan (BAR)	10.37
200 metres (wind: +0.8 m/s)	Reynier Mena (CUB)	20.41	Stanly del Carmen (DOM)	20.51	Ian Kerr (BAH)	20.83
400 metres	Nathon Allen (JAM)	45.39	Michael Cherry (USA)	45.50	Warren Hazel (SKN)	45.81 NR
800 metres	Isaiah Harris (USA)	1:47.52	Chris Sanders (USA)	1:47.77	Corey Bellemore (CAN)	1:47.88
1500 metres	Henry Wynne (USA)	3:51.81	Mike Tate (CAN)	3:51.91	Thomas Awad (USA)	3:54.51
5000 metres	Patrick Corona (USA)	15:18.26	Sydney Gidabuday (USA)	15:21.16	Alberto Gonzalez (GUA)	15:31.17
10,000 metres	Erik Peterson (USA)	30:28.74	Ian La Mere (USA)	30:33.68	Alberto Gonzalez (GUA)	31:41.60
110 metres hurdles (Note: Initial race winner Will Barnes with a time of 13.53 (13.527) was later disqualified due to an anti-doping rules violation.) (wind: -0.3 m/s)	Freddie Crittenden (USA)	13.53	Aaron Malett (USA)	13.67 (13.665)	Tyler Mason (JAM)	13.67 (13.669)
400 metres hurdles	Khalifah Rosser (USA)	49.25	José Gaspar (CUB)	49.92	Juander Santos (DOM)	50.02
3000 metres steeplechase	Antoine Thibeault (CAN)	8:55.96	Michael Erb (USA)	9:12.25	Brandon Allen (CAN)	9:18.81
4 × 100 metres relay	United States; Devin Jenkins; Christian Coleman; Kendal Williams; Fredrick Kerley	38.63	Jamaica; Ajamu Graham; Nathon Allen; Rohan Cole; Renard Howell	39.25	Bahamas; Anthony Adderley; Tadashi Pinder; Stephen Newbold; Ian Kerr	39.85
4 × 400 metres relay	United States; Dontavius Wright; Robert Grant; Khalifah Rosser; Michael Cherry	3:00.89	Jamaica; Twain Crooks; Martin Manley; Keeno Burrell; Nathon Allen	3:04.11	Bahamas; Maverick Bowleg; Ashley Riley; Janeko Cartwright; Stephen Newbold	3:04.74
20,000 metres walk	José Alejandro Barrondo (GUA)	1:34:32.01	Anthony Peters (USA)	1:35:04.77	Gerson Navas (ESA)	1:35:24.48
High jump	Avion Jones (USA)	2.22 m (7 ft 3 1/4 in)	Hiawatha Carter (USA)	2.19 m (7 ft 2 in)	Alhaji Manasray (CAN)	2.13 m (6 ft 11 3/4 in)
Pole vault	Devin King (USA)	5.10 m (16 ft 8 3/4 in)	Jorge Luna (MEX)	5.10 m (16 ft 8 3/4 in)	Abbey Alcon (DOM)	4.90 m (16 ft 3/4 in)
Long jump	Ifeanyichukwu Otuonye (TCA)	7.88 m (25 ft 10 in) +0.6	Jonathan Addison (USA)	7.80 m (25 ft 7 in) +1.7	KeAndre Bates (USA)	7.77 m (25 ft 5 3/4 in) +1.1
Triple jump	Eric Sloan (USA)	16.15 m (52 ft 11 3/4 in) +0.0	Lathone Collie (BAH)	15.80 m (51 ft 10 in) -0.3	Jeremiah Green (USA)	15.04 m (49 ft 4 in) -1.1
Shot put	Braheme Days, Jr. (USA)	19.36 m (63 ft 6 in)	Josh Freeman (USA)	19.27 m (63 ft 2 1/2 in)	Eldred Henry (IVB)	19.11 m (62 ft 8 1/4 in)
Discus throw	Brian Williams (USA)	58.00 m (190 ft 3 in)	Sam Mattis (USA)	57.40 m (188 ft 3 in)	Eldred Henry (IVB)	56.45 m (185 ft 2 in)
Hammer throw	Diego del Real (MEX)	74.55 m (244 ft 7 in) CR	Rudy Winkler (USA)	73.00 m (239 ft 6 in)	Alexander Young (USA)	67.43 m (221 ft 2 in)
Javelin throw	Curtis Thompson (USA)	79.28 m (260 ft 1 in)	David Carreon (MEX)	76.25 m (250 ft 1 in)	Janiel Craigg (BAR)	75.62 m (248 ft 1 in) NR
Decathlon	Rostam Turner (CAN)	7601 pts CR	Cody Walton (USA)	7409 pts	Zachary Bornstein (CAN)	7169 pts

=== Women ===
Event	Gold		Silver		Bronze	
100 metres (wind: -2.0 m/s)	Sashalee Forbes (JAM)	11.51	Shayla Sanders (USA)	11.52	Carmiesha Cox (BAH)	11.76
200 metres (wind: +2.6 m/s)	Kali Davis-White (JAM)	22.66w	Arialis Gandulla (CUB)	23.36w	Robin Reynolds (USA)	23.40w
400 metres	Chrisann Gordon (JAM)	51.02 CR	Jaide Stepter (USA)	52.51	Sonikqua Walker (JAM)	52.69
800 metres	Lisneydis Veitia (CUB)	2:02.02 CR	Jenna Westaway (CAN)	2:03.90	Sahily Diago (CUB)	2:04.20
1500 metres	Jenna Westaway (CAN)	4:16.03	Mary Cain (USA)	4:16.86	Regan Yee (CAN)	4:19.16
5000 metres	Lauren La Rocco (USA)	16:57.27	Angelin Figueroa (PUR)	18:36.88	Wendy Ascencio (ESA)	19:15.88
10,000 metres	Chelsea Blaase (USA)	35:30.87 CR	Olivia Pratt (USA)	36:17.28	Wendy Ascencio (ESA)	40:17.85
100 metres hurdles (wind: -1.5 m/s)	Jasmine Camacho-Quinn (PUR)	12.78 CR	Pedrya Seymour (BAH)	12.83 NR	Alexis Perry (USA)	13.12
400 metres hurdles	Kiah Seymour (USA)	56.19	Autumne Franklin (USA)	56.36	Tia-Adana Belle (BAR)	57.16
3000 metres steeplechase	Regan Yee (CAN)	10:38.79	Paige Kouba (USA)	10:38.84	Irma Aldana (ESA)	12:05.43
4 × 100 metres relay	United States; Robin Reynolds; Shayla Sanders; Deanna Hill; Shayla Sanders	42.93	Jamaica; Chanice Bonner; Kali Davis-White; Sashalee Forbes; Sonikqua Walker	43.63	Bahamas; Pedrya Seymour; Tayla Carter; Danielle Gibson; Carmiesha Cox	45.17
4 × 400 metres relay	United States; Carly Muscaro; Jaide Stepter; Kiah Seymour; Shakima Wimbley	3:28.45	Jamaica; Sonikqua Walker; Dawnlee Lonely; Samantha James; Chrisann Gordon	3:32.06	Canada; Taysia Radoslav; Jenna Westaway; Medeleine Price; Maïté Bouchard	3:44.45
10,000 metres walk	Yesenia Miranda (ESA)	49:24.70 CR	Molly Josephs (USA)	53:34.86	Karin Vicente (GUA)	55:09.10
High jump	Akela Jones (BAR)	1.91 m (6 ft 3 in) CR	Loretta Blaut (USA)	1.81 m (5 ft 11 1/4 in)	Georgia Ellenwood (CAN)	1.78 m (5 ft 10 in)
Pole vault	Megan Clark (USA)	4.40 m (14 ft 5 in) =CR	Yaritza Diaz (PUR)	3.70 m (12 ft 1 1/2 in)		
Long jump	Quanesha Burks (USA)	6.74 m (22 ft 1 1/4 in) -1.0 (6.69) CR	Akela Jones (BAR)	6.74 m (22 ft 1 1/4 in) -1.6 (6.56) CR	Alexis Perry (USA)	6.66 m (21 ft 10 in) -1.0
Triple jump	Dannielle Gibson (BAH)	13.54 m (44 ft 5 in) +1.0	Simone Charley (USA)	13.50 m (44 ft 3 1/4 in) +0.0	Danielle McQueen (USA)	12.98 m (42 ft 7 in) +1.4
Shot put	Raven Saunders (USA)	18.49 m (60 ft 7 3/4 in) CR	Sahily Viart (CUB)	17.42 m (57 ft 1 3/4 in)	Erin Farmer (USA)	16.43 m (53 ft 10 3/4 in)
Discus throw	Shelbi Vaughn (USA)	57.20 m (187 ft 7 in) CR	Tera Novy (USA)	55.70 m (182 ft 8 in)	Agnes Esser (CAN)	51.50 m (168 ft 11 in)
Hammer throw	Becky Famurewa (USA)	61.03 m (200 ft 2 in)	Monique Griffiths (USA)	60.21 m (197 ft 6 in)	Agnes Esser (CAN)	58.44 m (191 ft 8 in)
Javelin throw	Yulenmis Aguilar (CUB)	57.09 m (187 ft 3 in) CR	Sarah Firestone (USA)	53.96 m (177 ft 0 in)	Jessie Merckle (USA)	53.28 m (174 ft 9 in)
Heptathlon	Taliyah Brooks (USA)	5609 pts	Clairwin Dameus (USA)	5087 pts	Lyxandra Geerman (ARU)	3998 pts

== Medal table (unofficial) ==
* Host nation (El Salvador)

Rank	Nation	Gold	Silver	Bronze	Total
1	United States (USA)	25	26	11	62
2	Jamaica (JAM)	4	4	1	9
3	Canada (CAN)	4	2	9	15
4	Cuba (CUB)	3	3	1	7
5	Puerto Rico (PUR)	2	2	0	4
6	Bahamas (BAH)	1	2	5	8
7	Mexico (MEX)	1	2	0	3
8	Barbados (BAR)	1	1	3	5
9	El Salvador (ESA)*	1	0	4	5
10	Guatemala (GUA)	1	0	3	4
11	Turks and Caicos Islands (TKS)	1	0	0	1
12	Dominican Republic (DOM)	0	2	2	4
13	British Virgin Islands (IVB)	0	0	2	2
14	Aruba (ARU)	0	0	1	1
14	Saint Kitts and Nevis (SKN)	0	0	1	1
Totals (15 entries)		44	44	43	131

== Participation ==
According to an unofficial count, 305 athletes from 28 nations participated. The only eligible countries not participating were Dominica, Grenada, and Saint Lucia.

- Anguilla (1)
- Antigua and Barbuda (4)
- Aruba (2)
- Bahamas (14)
- Barbados (9)
- Belize (8)
- Bermuda (2)
- British Virgin Islands (7)
- Canada (32)
- Cayman Islands (1)
- Costa Rica (18)
- Cuba (9)
- Dominican Republic (8)
- Haiti (2)
- Honduras (1)
- Guatemala (12)
- Jamaica (32)
- Mexico (9)
- Montserrat (1)
- Nicaragua (2)
- Puerto Rico (8)
- Saint Kitts and Nevis (5)
- Saint Vincent and the Grenadines (4)
- El Salvador (25)
- Trinidad and Tobago (11)
- Turks and Caicos Islands (1)
- United States (75)
- United States Virgin Islands (2)
