= Braheme Days Jr. =

American shot putter

Personal information
- Nationality: American
- Born: January 18, 1995 (age 31) Bridgeton, New Jersey
- Height: 6 ft 1 in (1.85 m)
- Weight: 299 lb (136 kg)

Sport
- Sport: Track and field
- Event: Shot put
- College team: UCLA Bruins

Achievements and titles
- Personal best(s): SP (5 kg): 20.14 m (Lille 2011); SP (5.45 kg): 21.53 m (New York 2012) SP (6 kg): 21.16 m (Chula Vista 2014)
Medal record
Athletics
Representing the United States
World Junior Championships
Bronze medal – third place	2014 Oregon	Shot put
World Youth Championships
Bronze medal – third place	2011 Lille	Shot put
NACAC Under-23 Championship
Gold medal – first place	2016 San Salvador	Shot Put

Braheme Days Jr. (born January 18, 1995) is an American shot putter.

He won a bronze medal at the 2011 World Youth Championships in Athletics.

== Prep ==
Days won his first National HS Shot Put title at the NBIN meet in New York, New York with a throw of 21.00m (5.45 kg)

Days attended Bridgeton High School and was selected by The Press of Atlantic City as their Boys' Track and Field Athlete of the Year in 2011, as well as Indoor Athlete of the Year 2012.

He was a USA Today All-American track and field selection in 2012.

== NCAA ==
He eventually signed to the UCLA Bruins in February 2013.

Days is the current American Junior Record holder in the shot put with a distance of 21.16 m (69 ft 5 in)(6 kg). He placed tenth in shot put at 2016 NCAA Division I Indoor Track and Field Championships in 18.76 m (61 ft 6 1/2 in). Days placed fifth in shot put at 2016 NCAA Division I Outdoor Track and Field Championships in 20.03 m (65 ft 8 1/2 in). He won shot put at 2016 NACAC Under-23 Championships in Athletics in 19.36 m (63 ft 6 in).
