= Paige Kouba =

American steeplechase runner

Personal information
- Nationality: American
- Born: January 8, 1994 (age 32) Eugene, Oregon
- Height: 5 ft 9 in (1.75 m)

Sport
- Sport: Athletics
- Event: 3000 metres steeplechase
- College team: Harvard Crimson
- Club: Saucony
- Turned pro: 2016

Achievements and titles
- Personal best: 3000 m SC: 9:50.21
Medal record
Representing the United States
NACAC Under-23 Championships
Silver medal – second place	2016 El Salvador	steeplechase

Paige Kouba (born January 8, 1994) is an American cross country and track athlete from Eugene, Oregon. Paige earned a 2016 NACAC U23 silver medal. As a long-distance runner she has been most successful in the steeplechase, earning National Collegiate Athletic Association (NCAA) All-American honors in that event in 2016 after finishing 7th at Outdoor Nationals. She was a 2016 Olympic Trials qualifier, the 2016 Ivy League champion in the steeplechase, and was also a member of Harvard's winning DMR at the 2016 Ivy League indoor championships.

== High school ==
As a freshman, Paige Kouba won the 2008 Northwest regional meet in the Nike Cross Nationals series, and was a four time state cross country finalist. As a senior, Kouba won the 2012 Outdoor track and field Oregon School Activities Association 6A title in 800 meters.

== NCAA ==
Competing in the Ivy League (2012–16), Kouba ran cross country and track and field and was captain of the 2015-16 Harvard University team that won in the 2016 Ivy League outdoor championships at Princeton University. Kouba placed 7th in steeplechase at 2016 NCAA Division I Outdoor Track and Field Championships.

== Professional ==
Paige Kouba signed with Saucony in July 2016 and debuted at the 2016 United States Olympic Trials (track and field). Kouba represented the US in steeplechase by earning a silver medal in a time of 10:38.84 at 2016 NACAC Under-23 Championships in Athletics in El Salvador contributing to USA's 62 medals at this competition.
