= Lexi Weeks =

American pole vaulter (born 1996)

Lexi Jacobus
Personal information
- Born: Alexis Weeks; November 20, 1996 (age 29) Jacksonville, Arkansas, U.S.
- Height: 5 ft 6 in (168 cm)
- Weight: 130 lb (59 kg)

Sport
- Country: United States
- Sport: Track and field
- Event: Pole vault
- Team: University of Arkansas
- Turned pro: 2019
- Retired: 2021

Achievements and titles
- Personal bests: 4.70 metres (15 ft 5 in); 4.68 metres (15 ft 4 1/2 in) i

Alexis "Lexi" Jacobus (née Weeks, born November 20, 1996) is an American pole vaulter. Lexi Jacobus has an identical twin Tori Weeks Hoggard, who is also a pole vaulter. Lexi qualified for the 2016 Summer Olympics by finishing third at the Olympic trials. Jacobus is the first woman to win 4 NCAA Division I pole Vault titles.

Lexi Jacobus, a four-time NCAA pole vault champion, seven-time All-American and five-time SEC champion for the Arkansas Razorbacks, has joined the University of Arkansas at Little Rock Trojans coaching staff. Derek Jacobus, Lexi Jacobus’ husband who was an All-American decathlete at the University of Arkansas-Fayetteville, is a University of Arkansas at Little Rock GA coach after previously serving as volunteer assistant coach. Lexi Jacobus will to continue training for the 2020 Olympics after graduating from Arkansas with a biochemistry degree and a 4.0 GPA while serving as assistant coach at University of Arkansas at Little Rock.

== Global ==
Jacobus qualified for 2017 USA Outdoor Track and Field Championships.

Jacobus placed 19th in Women's Pole Vault at the 2016 Olympics, clearing 4.45 metres (14 ft 7 in) and third at the Olympic trials pole vault in 4.70 metres (15 ft 5 in).

representing Team USA
Athletics at the 2016 Summer Olympics	4.45 m (14 ft 7 in)	T-19th
US Championships
2019 USA Outdoor Track and Field Championships	NH @ 4.40 m (14 ft 5 in)	T-11th
2018 USA Outdoor Track and Field Championships	4.45 m (14 ft 7 in)	9th
2017 USA Outdoor Track and Field Championships	NH @ 4.40 m (14 ft 5 in)	T-10th
2016 Olympic trials	4.70 m (15 ft 5 in)	(bronze) 3rd

== NCAA ==
Lexi, Tori Weeks Hoggard, and Desiree Freier placed 1st, 2nd and 5th scoring 22 points for the Arkansas Razorbacks at 2018 NCAA Indoor Track and Field championships. Lexi Jacobus set an NCAA Division I championship record and won at 2018 NCAA Division I Indoor Track and Field Championships pole vault in 4.66 metres (15 ft 3 1/2 in) and placed third Southeastern Conference Indoor Track and Field Championships in 4.38 metres (14 ft 4 1/2 in) behind champion Olivia Gruver and her sister Victoria Hoggard. In 2019, Lexi won the NCAA Indoor Championships, her twin sister won the Outdoor Championships.

Jacobus placed second 2017 NCAA Division I Outdoor Track and Field Championships pole vault in 4.45 metres (14 ft 7 in) and won 2017 pole vault title at Southeastern Conference Outdoor Track and Field Championships in 4.45 metres (14 ft 7 in). She placed fifth at 2017 NCAA Division I Indoor Track and Field Championships pole vault in 4.30 metres (14 ft 1 1/2 in) and placed second Southeastern Conference Indoor Track and Field Championships in 4.57 metres (15 ft 0 in) to her sister Tori Weeks.

Jacobus won titles at 2016 NCAA Division I Outdoor Track and Field Championships pole vault in 4.50 metres (14 ft 9 in) and Southeastern Conference Outdoor Track and Field Championships in 4.57 metres (15 ft 0 in). She won a title at 2016 NCAA Division I Indoor Track and Field Championships pole vault in 4.63 metres (15 ft 2 1/2 in) and Southeastern Conference Indoor Track and Field Championships in 4.48 metres (14 ft 8 1/2 in).

representing Arkansas Razorbacks track and field
2019 NCAA Division I Outdoor Track and Field Championships	Pole Vault	4.20 m (13 ft 9 1/4 in)	9th
2019 Southeastern Conference Outdoor track and field Championship	Pole Vault	4.36 m (14 ft 3 1/2 in)	3rd (bronze)
2019 NCAA Division I Indoor Track and Field Championships	Pole Vault	4.61 m (15 ft 1 1/4 in)	1st (gold)
2019 Southeastern Conference Indoor track and field Championship	Pole Vault	4.68 m (15 ft 4 1/4 in)	1st (gold)
2018 NCAA Division I Outdoor Track and Field Championships	Pole Vault	4.50 m (14 ft 9 in)	2nd (silver)
2018 Southeastern Conference Outdoor track and field Championship	Pole Vault	4.65 m (15 ft 3 in)	1st (gold)
2018 NCAA Division I Indoor Track and Field Championships	Pole Vault	4.66 m (15 ft 3 1/4 in)	1st (gold)
2018 Southeastern Conference Indoor track and field Championship	Pole Vault	4.38 m (14 ft 4 1/4 in)	3rd (bronze)
2017 NCAA Division I Outdoor Track and Field Championships	Pole Vault	4.45 m (14 ft 7 in)	2nd (silver)
2017 Southeastern Conference Outdoor track and field Championship	Pole Vault	4.45 m (14 ft 7 in)	1st (gold)
2017 NCAA Division I Indoor Track and Field Championships	Pole Vault	4.20 m (13 ft 9 1/4 in)	7th
2017 Southeastern Conference Indoor track and field Championship	Pole Vault	4.57 m (14 ft 11 3/4 in)	2nd (silver)
2016 NCAA Division I Outdoor Track and Field Championships	Pole Vault	4.50 m (14 ft 9 in)	1st (gold)
2016 Southeastern Conference Outdoor track and field Championship	Pole Vault	4.57 m (14 ft 11 3/4 in)	1st (gold)
2016 NCAA Division I Indoor Track and Field Championships	Pole Vault	4.63 m (15 ft 2 1/4 in)	1st (gold)
2016 Southeastern Conference Indoor track and field Championship	Pole Vault	4.48 m (14 ft 8 1/4 in)	1st (gold)

== Prep ==
Jacobus is from Cabot, Arkansas and attended Cabot High School. She set a national high school pole vault record in 2015 with a height of 14 feet, 7.5 inches Jacobus was honored by 2015 Arkansas Gatorade Player of the Year awards for Track and Field.

Jacobus cleared 4.46 metres (14 ft 7 1/2 in) in Black Springs, Arkansas and set the Pole vault American Junior record.

Jacobus won 3 titles at 2015 Arkansas Activities Association outdoor state track and field 7A championships Pole vault in 4.27 metres (14 ft 0 in), 100 m hurdles in 14.97 s, and Long jump in 5.37 metres (17 ft 7 1/2 in). She was runner-up to her sister Tori at the 2015 Arkansas Activities Association indoor state track and field 5A-7A championships Pole vault in 4.11 metres (13 ft 6 in) and won 4 × 400 m relay with Tristyn Edgar, Tori Weeks, Jennifer Bond, Lexi Weeks in 4:03.15.

Jacobus finished second at 2013 Arkansas Activities Association outdoor state track and field 7A championships Pole vault in 3.66 metres (12 ft 0 in). Weeks won 2013 Arkansas Activities Association indoor state track and field 5A-7A championships pole vault in 3.76 metres (12 ft 4 in).
