= Trey Culver =

American high jumper (born 1996)

Personal information
- National team: United States
- Born: July 18, 1996 (age 30) Dallas, Texas

Sport
- Sport: Track and Field
- Event: High Jump
- College team: Texas Tech University

Achievements and titles
- Personal best: 2.28m (Outdoor) 2.33m (Indoor)

Trey Culver (born July 18, 1996) is an American track and field athlete who competes in the high jump. He is a two-time NCAA champion and has competed for team USA at the NACAC Championships.

== Early life ==
Trey was born in Dallas, Texas, to Regina and Hiawatha Culver Jr. He grew up in Lubbock, Texas, where he attended Coronado High School. He finished third in the state 5A high jump in his senior year. Leaving high school he had JUCO offers to play basketball but decided to attend his hometown school, Texas Tech University, to compete on the Track and Field Team.

== Career ==
College Career

Culver has a very successful college career at Texas Tech. He was a seven-time USTFCCCA All-American, the 2017 USTFCCCA Male Scholar Athlete of the Year, the 2018 CoSIDA Male Academic All-American of the Year, a three-time Big-12 Champion, and a two-time NCAA indoor champion. On January 13, 2018 he jumped his indoor personal best 2.33m at the Corky Classic which at the time was the 4th highest jump in NCAA history.

Non-Collegiate Career

Culver first represented the United States at the 2016 NACAC U23 meet where he cleared 2.19m for second place. He also represented the United States at the 2018 NACAC Championships where he finished in 8th place clearing 2.16m. In 2021 he finished 5th at the U.S. Olympic Trials. He has an outdoor personal best of 2.28m from 2018.

NCAA championship Results
Year	Meet	Venue	Event	Place	Mark
2015	NCAA Outdoor Championships	Hayward Field	High Jump	11th	2.16m
2016	NCAA Indoor Championships	Birmingham CrossPlex	High Jump	1st	2.23m
2016	NCAA Outdoor Championships	Hayward Field	High Jump	5th	2.19m
2017	NCAA Indoor Championships	Gilliam Indoor Track Stadium	High Jump	1st	2.26m
2017	NCAA Outdoor Championships	Hayward Field	High Jump	5th	2.19m
2018	NCAA Indoor Championships	Gilliam Indoor Track Stadium	High Jump	2nd	2.29m
2018	NCAA Outdoor Championships	Hayward Field	High Jump	4th	2.21m

== Personal life ==
Trey is from an athletic family. He has two younger brothers, J.J., and Jarrett. J.J. played basketball collegiately for Wayland Baptist where he once scored 100 points in a single game. His youngest brother, Jarrett played basketball at Texas Tech and now is a professional basketball player in the NBA.

His father is a pastor at Rising Star Baptist Church in Lubbock.
