= Kali Davis-White =

American-Jamaican sprinter

Personal information
- Full name: Kali Davis-White
- Nationality: Jamaican, American
- Born: October 27, 1994 (age 31) Lauderdale Lakes, Florida, U.S.

Sport
- Sport: Running, Track and Field
- Event: Sprints
- College team: Tennessee

Achievements and titles
- Personal bests: 60m: 7.28s, Blacksburg, (2016); 100m: 11.27s, Kingston, (2016); 200m: 22.86s, Tallahassee, (2016)
Medal record
Women's athletics
Representing Jamaica
NACAC Under-23 Championship
Gold medal – first place	2016 San Salvador	200 m
Silver medal – second place	2016 San Salvador	4x100 m relay

Kali Davis-White (born October 27, 1994) is a sprint athlete, who specializes in the 60 meters, 100 meters, and 200 meters. She competes for the Tennessee Volunteers.

== Career ==
=== College ===
Kali Davis-White started her college career at Florida State University in the 2014 season. After her sophomore year at Florida State, she transferred to Tennessee where she competed in 2016.

=== Professional ===
Davis-White was born and competed for the United States as a Junior athlete. She qualified for the 2012 World Junior Championships in the 200 meters for the United States. Both of her parents were born in Jamaica allowing her to compete for either the U.S. or Jamaica. She qualified for Jamaica at the 2016 Olympics in the 200 meters with a time of 22.94 seconds.

== See also ==
- Jamaica at the 2016 Summer Olympics
