= Sydney Gidabuday =

American distance runner

Personal information
- Born: August 21, 1996 (age 29)
- Education: Adams State University
- Occupation: Distance runner

Sydney Gidabuday (born August 21, 1996, in Orange, California) is an American distance runner who runs for the Boulder-based team The Track Club. He is coached by Evan Schwartz. He competes in events ranging from 3000m to the half-marathon. He attended El Modena High School of Orange, California and later competed on the collegiate level at Adams State University in Alamosa, Colorado.

== Early life and education ==
Sydney Gidabuday's birth parents are both Tanzanian-born. Although Gidabuday was raised in Orange, California by an adoptive family and is an American citizen, he was raised in Tanzania from a young age before returning to California for high school and further education. Gidabuday attended El Modena High School in Orange, California where he competed for the track team. Gidabuday then went on to receive a scholarship to attend DII college Adams State University, where he studied Business and Sports Management.

== Running ==
In college, Sydney dominated the DII college scene becoming a seven-time NCAA champion whilst competing for Adams State University. In doing so, Gidabuday became the second-fastest 5,000m runner in DII history and became the Adams State University 5000m record holder (13:29.31). Sydney Gidabuday currently runs with the Roots Running Project coached by Dr. Richard Hansen and based out of Boulder, Colorado. Other team members include Noah Droddy, Frank Lara, and Alia Gray. He previously ran for the professional running team Tinman Elite based in Boulder, Colorado, and coached by Tom Schwartz. After his time with Tinman Elite, Sydney trained with the Roots Running Project before joining The Track Club. His personal bests are 4:01.76 for the mile, 7:54.77 for 3,000m, 13:22.40 for 5,000m and 28:15.40 for 10,000m
