= Travia Jones =

Canadian sprinter (born 1995)

Personal information
- Nationality: Canadian
- Born: 12 July 1995 (age 30)

Sport
- Sport: Sprinting
- Event: 400 metres

Travia Jones (born 12 July 1995) is a Canadian sprinter. She competed in the women's 400 metres at the 2017 World Championships in Athletics.

Jones was an All-American sprinter for the LSU Lady Tigers track and field team in the NCAA.
