= Senoj-Jay Givans =

Jamaican sprinter

Senoj-Jay Givans (Born December 30, 1993 in Jamaica) is a track runner formerly from the University of Texas born in Jamaica. He ran a 9.96 100-meter time at the 2016 NCAA championships breaking the 10-second barrier. This was the 9th fastest time in collegiate history. He competed in the Olympic Trials for the Jamaica in 2016. He earned a bronze medal at the 2012 World Junior Championships in Athletics – Men's 4 × 100 metres relay.
