= MJ Erb =

American long-distance runner

Personal information
- Nationality: American
- Born: February 2, 1994 (age 32) Farmington, New York, U.S.
- Height: 6 ft 2 in (1.88 m)

Sport
- Sport: Track, long-distance running
- Events: Steeplechase, mile, 5000 meters, 1500 metres
- College team: Ole Miss Rebels
- Club: Saucony Freedom Track Club
- Turned pro: 2017
- Coached by: Tim Broe

Achievements and titles
- Personal bests: Steeplechase: 8:26.75 (2017) mile: 4:04.66 (2014) 5000 meters: 13:43.55 (2017)
Medal record
Representing United States
NACAC U23
Silver medal – second place	2016 El Salvador	3000 Steeplechase
- Updated on January 29, 2017

MJ Erb (born February 2, 1994) is an American long-distance runner born in Farmington, New York.

== Professional ==
Erb ran 8:29.09 to place seventh in the steeplechase at 2018 USA Outdoor Track and Field Championships in Des Moines, Iowa.

Erb ran 8:32.78 to win the steeplechase at 2018 Occidental College USATF Distance Classic.

Erb ran 29:43 for 10 km to place ninth at 2018 USA Cross Country Championships in Tallahassee, Florida.

Michael Erb ran 8:26.75 to place seventh in the steeplechase at 2017 USA Outdoor Track and Field Championships at Sacramento state.

Erb represented the United States and earned a silver medal 2016 NACAC Under-23 Championships in Athletics.

A former All-Greater Rochester cross-country standout competed Friday night at the United States Track and Field Olympic Trials in Oregon where he placed 15th in the 2016 United States Olympic Trials (track and field) steeplechase final.

Erb placed 23rd at U20 2013 USA Cross Country Championships in 25:42.9.

== NCAA ==
Erb is an All-American track and field athlete who competes for Ole Miss Rebels track and field. MJ Erb earned an All-American Cross country award from USTFCCCA in November 2014 when he competed at Syracuse University.

Representing Ole Miss Rebels
Year	Southeastern Conference Cross Country	NCAA Cross Country	Southeastern Conference indoor	NCAA indoor	Southeastern Conference Outdoor	NCAA Outdoor
2016-17	23:39.7 2nd	29:58.5 6th	5000 m 13:52.08 1st	5000 m 13:51.73 7th	5000 m 13:47.64 1st	
2016-17	23:39.7 2nd	29:58.5 6th	3000 m 7:59.63 2nd		3000 m SC 8:48.07 1st	3000 m SC 8:32.38 4th
2015-16	27:41.5 115th	31:50.8 187th	5000 m 14:21.89 11th		5000 m 14:05.23 3rd	
2015-16	27:41.5 115th	31:50.8 187th	3000 m 8:27.93 16th		3000 SC 8:43.06 3rd	3000 SC 8:43.81 8th
2014-15			5000 m 14:05.86 4th			
2014-15			3000 m 8:16.62 8th			
Representing Syracuse Orangemen
Year	Atlantic Coast Conference Cross Country	NCAA Cross Country	Atlantic Coast Conference indoor	NCAA indoor	Atlantic Coast Conference Outdoor	NCAA Outdoor
2014-15	23:36.0 11th	30:52.9 37th				
2013-14	24:37.9 21st	30:59.5 57th	5000 m 14:54.97 31st		5000 m 14:18.20 13th	
2013-14	24:37.9 21st	30:59.5 57th	DMR 9:59.81 8th		3000 SC 8:51.86 2nd	3000 SC 8:51.74 34th
Year	Big East Conference Cross Country	NCAA Cross Country	Big East Conference indoor	NCAA indoor	Big East Conference Outdoor	NCAA Outdoor
2012-13					3000 sc 9:14.65 5th	

== Prep ==
Erb competed for Victor Senior High School in Victor, New York. At the 2012 New York State Public High School Athletic Association, Erb placed sixth in 3000 Steeplechase in 9:32.10. At the 2011 Nike Cross Nationals, Erb placed 18th to earn high school All-American honor.
