= USATF National Junior Olympic Track & Field Championships =

US athletics competition

The USATF National Junior Olympic Track & Field Championships, also known as the USATF Junior Olympics, is an annual track and field competition for American athletes between the ages of seven and eighteen. It is organised by USA Track & Field and features six different age categories, each covering two years. Qualification for the competition is dependent upon performances at the preliminary, association level (usually a state), then the regional championships; the top five of each event at regional level earn the right to compete at the national competition.

The competition had its first edition in 1967 and has been held every year since. The event grew in stature to include around 10,000 athletes at the 48th edition in 2014. The 50th edition was held in Sacramento, California. The event and its qualifiers serve to support the development of grassroots track and field competition in the United States. The national level event has been attended by several prominent American athletes in their youth, including Olympic champions Maurice Greene, Allyson Felix and Bryan Clay, as well as three-time world champion John Godina.

The USATF event is a stand-alone track and field event, as opposed to the broader multi-sport programme of the AAU Junior Olympic Games.

== See also ==
- United States junior records in athletics
