= 2024 USA Indoor Track and Field Championships – Results =

These are the results of the 2024 USA Indoor Track and Field Championships, the American qualifying meet for the 2024 World Athletics Indoor Championships. It took place on February 16-17 in Albuquerque, New Mexico at the Albuquerque Convention Center. On day one, two world records and one world best were set at the meeting.

== Results ==
Men's 400m Round 1
Place	Athlete	Time	Heat
1	Jacory Patterson	45.51	1
2	Brian Faust	45.57	3
3	Christopher Bailey	45.61	1
4	Bryce Deadmon	45.64	3
5	Matthew Boling	45.86	2
6	Trevor Bassitt	46.34	3
7	Wilbert London	46.82	1
8	Jonah Vigil	47.01	1
9	Paul Dedewo	47.10	4
10	Jeremiah Curry	47.13	2
11	Demarius Smith	47.26	4
12	Ryan Willie	47.47	4
13	Chance Tanner	47.53	3
14	James Milholen	47.67	2
15	Willington Wright	47.75	3
16	Elija Godwin	47.87	2

Men's 400m
Place	Athlete	Time
1st place, gold medalist(s)	Brian Faust	45.47
2nd place, silver medalist(s)	Jacory Patterson	45.48
3rd place, bronze medalist(s)	Christopher Bailey	45.76
4	Paul Dedewo	46.08
5	Matthew Boling	46.19
6	Bryce Deadmon	46.60

Men's 800m Round 1
Place	Athlete	Time	Heat
1	Isaiah Harris	1:46.97	2
2	Josh Hoey	1:47.04	2
3	Vincent Crisp	1:47.04	3
4	Abraham Alvarado	1:47.17	3
5	Sam Ellis	1:47.26	2
6	Brannon Kidder	1:47.45	2
7	Collin Dylla	1:47.47	3
8	Luciano Fiore	1:47.58	3
9	Shane Streich	1:48.15	4
10	Ben Nagel	1:48.28	4
11	Bryce Hoppel	1:48.57	1
12	Matt Wisner	1:48.63	1
13	Christian Harrison	1:49.30	4
14	Cass Elliott	1:49.75	4
15	Jaxson Hoey	1:49.83	2
16	Grant Grosvenor	1:50.10	1
17	Colin Schultz	1:56.99	1

Men's 800m
Place	Athlete	Time
1st place, gold medalist(s)	Bryce Hoppel	1:46.67
2nd place, silver medalist(s)	Isaiah Harris	1:46.78
3rd place, bronze medalist(s)	Josh Hoey	1:47.41
4	Abraham Alvarado	1:47.86
5	Vincent Crisp	1:47.99
6	Shane Streich	1:48.41

Men's 3000m
Place	Athlete	Time
1st place, gold medalist(s)	Yared Nuguse	7:55.76
2nd place, silver medalist(s)	Olin Hacker	7:56.22
3rd place, bronze medalist(s)	Morgan Beadlescomb	7:56.70
4	Dillon Maggard	7:57.56
5	Abdihamid Nur	7:58.65
6	Kasey Knevelbaard	7:58.99
7	Sam Gilman	8:00.55
8	Matthew Wilkinson	8:01.51
9	Ian Shanklin	8:01.53
10	Ben Veatch	8:02.68
11	Alec Basten	8:05.35
12	Waleed Suliman	8:09.06
13	Isaac Updike	8:09.55
14	Nick Randazzo	8:12.90
15	Willy Fink	8:14.72

Men's 60mH
Place	Athlete	Time
1st place, gold medalist(s)	Trey Cunningham	7.39
2nd place, silver medalist(s)	Cameron Murray	7.45
3rd place, bronze medalist(s)	Daniel Roberts	7.48
4	Louis Rollins	7.56
5	Michael Dickson	7.57
6	Cordell Tinch	7.58
7	Freddie Crittenden	7.58

Men's 60mH Round 1
Place	Athlete	Time	Heat
1	Grant Holloway	7.27	1
2	Trey Cunningham	7.46	2
3	Cordell Tinch	7.50	2
4	Cameron Murray	7.51	1
5	Louis Rollins	7.56	2
6	Daniel Roberts	7.58	1
7	Freddie Crittenden	7.59	1
8	Michael Dickson	7.59	2
9	Dylan Beard	7.65	2
10	Johnny Brackins	7.66	2
11	Paris Williams	7.69	1
12	Devon Montgomery	7.78	2
13	Titus Moore	7.85	1
14	Ryan Fontenot	7.85	2
15	Parker Bowden	8.62	1
	Jamal Britt	DNS	1

Men's High Jump
Place	Athlete	Mark
1st place, gold medalist(s)	Shelby McEwen	2.28 m
2nd place, silver medalist(s)	Vernon Turner	2.25 m
3rd place, bronze medalist(s)	Kyle Rollins	2.25 m
4	Elijah Kosiba	2.22 m
5	Jaivon Harrison	2.22 m
6	Corvell Todd	2.22 m
7	Anthony Jones	2.17 m
8	Justin Lewis	2.17 m
9	Trey Allen	2.17 m
10	Mayson Conner	2.17 m
11	Jonathan Rankins-James	2.17 m
12	Brion Stephens	2.17 m

Men's Pole Vault
Place	Athlete	Mark
1st place, gold medalist(s)	Chris Nilsen	6.00 m
2nd place, silver medalist(s)	Sam Kendricks	5.95 m
3rd place, bronze medalist(s)	Austin Miller	5.90 m
4	Olen Tray Oates	5.80 m
5	Nate Richartz	5.75 m
6	Matt Ludwig	5.75 m
7	Luke Winder	5.65 m
8	KC Lightfoot	5.65 m
9	Jacob Wooten	5.65 m
10	Clayton Fritsch	5.65 m
11	Zach McWhorter	5.50 m
12	Carson Cody Waters	5.50 m
	Zach Bradford	NM
	Trevor Stephenson	NM

Men's Triple Jump
Place	Athlete	Mark
1st place, gold medalist(s)	Chris Carter	16.49 m
2nd place, silver medalist(s)	Chris Benard	16.42 m
3rd place, bronze medalist(s)	James Carter	16.16 m
4	Sir-Jonathan Sims	15.40 m
5	Isaiah Griffith	15.24 m

Men's Weight Throw
Place	Athlete	Mark
1st place, gold medalist(s)	Daniel Haugh	26.35 m
2nd place, silver medalist(s)	Isaiah Rogers	24.41 m
3rd place, bronze medalist(s)	Tanner Berg	23.41 m
4	Peyton Barton	22.79 m
5	Newlyn Stephenson	21.77 m
6	Alex Kristeller	21.63 m
7	Morgan Shigo	21.10 m
8	Joseph White	20.66 m
9	Anthony Harrison	20.48 m
10	Taige Bryant	20.13 m

Men's 3000m Race Walk
Place	Athlete	Time
1st place, gold medalist(s)	Nick Christie	11:56.06
2nd place, silver medalist(s)	Emmanuel Corvera	12:47.14
3rd place, bronze medalist(s)	Clayton Stoil	13:14.58
4	Dan Nehnevaj	15:21.41

Women's 400m Round 1
Place	Athlete	Time	Heat
1	Alexis Holmes	51.31	3
2	Talitha Diggs	51.93	1
3	Bailey Lear	52.13	3
4	Na'Asha Robinson	52.68	1
5	Jessica Wright	52.74	1
6	Quanera Hayes	52.79	2
7	Maya Singletary	52.82	3
8	Tiffany Hughey	53.27	2
9	Taylor Manson	53.37	2
10	Josie Donelson	53.44	2
11	Bianca Stubler	53.56	3

Women's 400m
Place	Athlete	Time
1st place, gold medalist(s)	Alexis Holmes	50.34
2nd place, silver medalist(s)	Talitha Diggs	51.23
3rd place, bronze medalist(s)	Quanera Hayes	51.76
4	Bailey Lear	52.06
5	Jessica Wright	52.37
6	Na'Asha Robinson	52.79

Women's 800m Round 1
Place	Athlete	Time	Heat
1	Addison Wiley	2:01.29	2
2	Allie Wilson	2:01.64	2
3	Nia Akins	2:02.53	3
4	Samantha Watson	2:02.65	3
5	Angel Piccirillo	2:02.99	3
6	Olivia Baker	2:03.10	1
7	Emily Richards	2:03.15	1
8	McKenna Keegan	2:04.18	2
9	Presley Weems	2:04.56	2
10	Mallory Lindaman	2:05.12	3
11	MaLeigha Menegatti	2:06.25	1
12	Stephanie Brokaw	2:06.86	1
	Sadi Henderson	DQ	3

Women's 800m
Place	Athlete	Time
1st place, gold medalist(s)	Allie Wilson	2:00.63
2nd place, silver medalist(s)	Addison Wiley	2:00.70
3rd place, bronze medalist(s)	Nia Akins	2:00.90
4	Samantha Watson	2:00.94
5	Olivia Baker	2:02.21
6	Angel Piccirillo	2:02.53

Women's 3000m
Place	Athlete	Time
1st place, gold medalist(s)	Elle Purrier St. Pierre	8:54.40
2nd place, silver medalist(s)	Josette Andrews	9:03.10
3rd place, bronze medalist(s)	Katie Wasserman	9:06.99
4	Rachel Schneider	9:10.21
5	Allie Buchalski	9:11.96
6	Elly Henes	9:12.25
7	Ella Donaghu	9:21.32
8	Angelina Ellis	9:23.51
9	Jennifer Randall	9:27.09
10	Carmen Graves	9:38.11
11	Kayley Delay	9:39.70
12	Lydia Olivere	9:49.05

Women's 60mH
Place	Athlete	Time
1st place, gold medalist(s)	Tia Jones	7.68
2nd place, silver medalist(s)	Jasmine Jones	7.78
3rd place, bronze medalist(s)	Masai Russell	7.80
4	Christina Clemons	7.90
5	Amber Hughes	7.99
6	Talie Bonds	8.06
	Alaysha Johnson	DQ
	Cortney Jones	DQ

Women's 60mH Round 1
Place	Athlete	Time	Heat
1	Tia Jones	7.67	2
2	Masai Russell	7.79	1
3	Jasmine Jones	7.82	2
4	Alaysha Johnson	7.86	1
5	Christina Clemons	7.90	2
6	Talie Bonds	7.95	1
7	Amber Hughes	7.98	2
8	Cortney Jones	8.02	2
9	Sharika Nelvis	8.14	1
10	Kaylah Robinson	8.15	1

Women's High Jump
Place	Athlete	Mark
1st place, gold medalist(s)	Vashti Cunningham	1.92 m
2nd place, silver medalist(s)	JaiCieonna Gero-Holt	1.89 m
3rd place, bronze medalist(s)	Cierra Allphin	1.85 m
4	Loretta Blaut	1.81 m
5	Zarriea Willis	1.81 m
6	Arika Harbo	1.77 m
7	Mercedeez Francis	1.77 m
8	Elizabeth Evans	1.77 m

Women's Long Jump
Place	Athlete	Mark
1st place, gold medalist(s)	Tara Davis-Woodhall	7.18 m
2nd place, silver medalist(s)	Jasmine Moore	6.93 m
3rd place, bronze medalist(s)	Monae' Nichols	6.73 m
4	Sha'Keela Saunders	6.54 m
5	Tiffany Flynn	6.52 m
6	Madisen Richards	6.44 m
7	Samiyah Samuels	6.38 m
8	Elizabeth White	6.29 m
9	Jasmyn Steels	6.25 m
10	Jenica Bosko	6.20 m
11	Melanie Winters	6.08 m
12	Jasmine Todd	6.05 m

Women's Shot Put
Place	Athlete	Mark
1st place, gold medalist(s)	Chase Jackson	20.02 m
2nd place, silver medalist(s)	Maggie Ewen	19.14 m
3rd place, bronze medalist(s)	Adelaide Aquilla	18.74 m
4	Jessica Woodard	18.57 m
5	Katie Fare	16.73 m
6	Rachel Fatherly	16.57 m
7	Jessica Ramsey	16.30 m
8	Josephine Schaefer	16.25 m
9	Rebecca Green	15.40 m

Women's 3000m Race Walk
Place	Athlete	Time
1st place, gold medalist(s)	Miranda Melville	13:55.24
2nd place, silver medalist(s)	Janelle Branch	13:59.81
3rd place, bronze medalist(s)	Robyn Stevens	14:07.30
4	Angelina Colon	14:33.36
5	Celina Lepe	14:33.38
6	Stephanie Casey	14:50.25
7	Marissa Sciotto	14:57.67
8	Kyra Pellegrino	16:40.47
	Ruby Ray	DNF

Men's 60m
Place	Athlete	Time
1st place, gold medalist(s)	Noah Lyles	6.43
2nd place, silver medalist(s)	Christian Coleman	6.44
3rd place, bronze medalist(s)	Ronnie Baker	6.51
4	Emmanuel Wells	6.56
5	Brandon Carnes	6.57
6	Zachaeus Beard	6.58
7	PJ Austin	6.58
8	J.T. Smith	6.58

Men's 60m Round 1
Place	Athlete	Time	Heat
1	Christian Coleman	6.49	2
2	Noah Lyles	6.52	3
3	Ronnie Baker	6.53	2
4	Emmanuel Wells	6.58	1
5	Zachaeus Beard	6.59	3
6	J.T. Smith	6.59	3
7	PJ Austin	6.60	1
8	Brandon Carnes	6.61	2
9	Demek Kemp	6.64	1
10	Coby Hilton	6.65	2
11	Sam Blaskowski	6.65	3
12	Jaelen Means	6.66	1
13	Dominick Corley	6.66	1
14	Kendal Williams	6.67	1
15	Kasaun James	6.67	3
16	Mason Phillips	6.72	2
17	Bryan Sosoo	6.72	2

Men's 1500m
Place	Athlete	Time
1st place, gold medalist(s)	Cole Hocker	3:37.51
2nd place, silver medalist(s)	Hobbs Kessler	3:38.76
3rd place, bronze medalist(s)	Henry Wynne	3:38.81
4	Cooper Teare	3:38.99
5	Vincent Ciattei	3:39.03
6	Sam Prakel	3:40.04
7	Casey Comber	3:40.06
8	Sam Ellis	3:41.74
9	Johnathan Reniewicki	3:43.44
10	Craig Engels	3:44.59
11	Eric Holt	3:44.97
12	Josh Thompson	3:54.25

Men's Long Jump
Place	Athlete	Mark
1st place, gold medalist(s)	Johnny Brackins	8.23 m
2nd place, silver medalist(s)	Isaac Grimes	8.06 m
3rd place, bronze medalist(s)	Jarrion Lawson	8.05 m
4	Trumaine Jefferson	8.03 m
5	Jason Smith	8.03 m
6	Will Williams	7.99 m
7	Rayvon Grey	7.95 m
8	James Carter	7.82 m
9	JuVaughn Harrison	7.73 m
10	Cordell Tinch	7.61 m
11	Cameron Crump	7.52 m
12	Jalen Seals	7.48 m

Men's Shot Put
Place	Athlete	Mark
1st place, gold medalist(s)	Ryan Crouser	22.80 m
2nd place, silver medalist(s)	Roger Steen	21.47 m
3rd place, bronze medalist(s)	Jordan Geist	20.50 m
4	Adrian Piperi	20.43 m
5	Nikolas Curtiss	20.33 m
6	Patrick Larrison	19.51 m
7	Jeff Kline	19.48 m
8	T'Mond Johnson	19.42 m
9	Myles Kerner	19.14 m
10	Zach Landa	18.63 m
11	Lucas Warning	17.45 m

Women's 60m
Place	Athlete	Time
1st place, gold medalist(s)	Aleia Hobbs	7.02
2nd place, silver medalist(s)	Mikiah Brisco	7.06
3rd place, bronze medalist(s)	Celera Barnes	7.09
4	Tamara Clark	7.12
5	Kiara Parker	7.15
6	Samirah Moody	7.27
7	Kiara Brown	7.30
8	Zhane Smith	7.37

Women's 60m Round 1
Place	Athlete	Time	Heat
1	Aleia Hobbs	7.10	2
2	Mikiah Brisco	7.13	1
3	Celera Barnes	7.15	2
4	Kiara Parker	7.18	2
5	Tamara Clark	7.20	1
6	Samirah Moody	7.25	1
7	Kiara Brown	7.28	1
8	Zhane Smith	7.28	2
9	Divonne Franklin	7.32	1
10	Anavia Battle	7.34	2
11	Taylor Anderson	7.41	1

Women's 1500m
Place	Athlete	Time
1st place, gold medalist(s)	Nikki Hiltz	4:08.35
2nd place, silver medalist(s)	Emily Mackay	4:08.70
3rd place, bronze medalist(s)	Anna Camp Bennett	4:10.20
4	Gabrielle Jennings	4:13.68
5	Rachel Schneider	4:13.76
6	Laurie Barton	4:16.84
7	Elly Henes	4:19.68
	Addison Wiley	DNF

Women's Pole Vault
Place	Athlete	Mark
1st place, gold medalist(s)	Katie Moon	4.80 m
2nd place, silver medalist(s)	Sandi Morris	4.75 m
3rd place, bronze medalist(s)	Gabriela Leon	4.70 m
4	Bridget Williams	4.60 m
5	Kristen Hixson	4.50 m
6	Emily Grove	4.50 m
7	Brynn King	4.50 m
8	Rachel Baxter	4.40 m
9	Sydney Walter	4.25 m
10	Mackenzie Beukes	4.25 m
11	Chinne Okoronkwo	4.25 m
	Marissa Kalsey	NM

Women's Triple Jump
Place	Athlete	Mark
1st place, gold medalist(s)	Keturah Orji	14.50 m
2nd place, silver medalist(s)	Jasmine Moore	14.43 m
3rd place, bronze medalist(s)	Mylana Hearn	13.81 m
4	Lexi Ellis	13.13 m
5	Imani Oliver	13.06 m
6	Arianna Fisher	13.04 m
7	Cierra Pulliam	12.78 m

Women's Weight Throw
Place	Athlete	Mark
1st place, gold medalist(s)	Erin Reese	25.73 m
2nd place, silver medalist(s)	Brooke Andersen	24.35 m
3rd place, bronze medalist(s)	Janeah Stewart	24.29 m
4	Rachel Tanczos	23.26 m
5	Elisia Lancaster	22.58 m
6	Chioma Njoku	20.15 m

=== Masters Events ===
Men's 200m
Place	Athlete	Time
1st place, gold medalist(s)	Antoine Echols	21.90
2nd place, silver medalist(s)	Durran Dunn	22.87
3rd place, bronze medalist(s)	Garth Robinson	23.05

Women's 200m
Place	Athlete	Time
1st place, gold medalist(s)	Easter Grant	24.60
2nd place, silver medalist(s)	Angee Henry	25.35
3rd place, bronze medalist(s)	Cynthia McNamee	26.77
