= 2026 USA Outdoor Track and Field Championships =

National track and field championship event

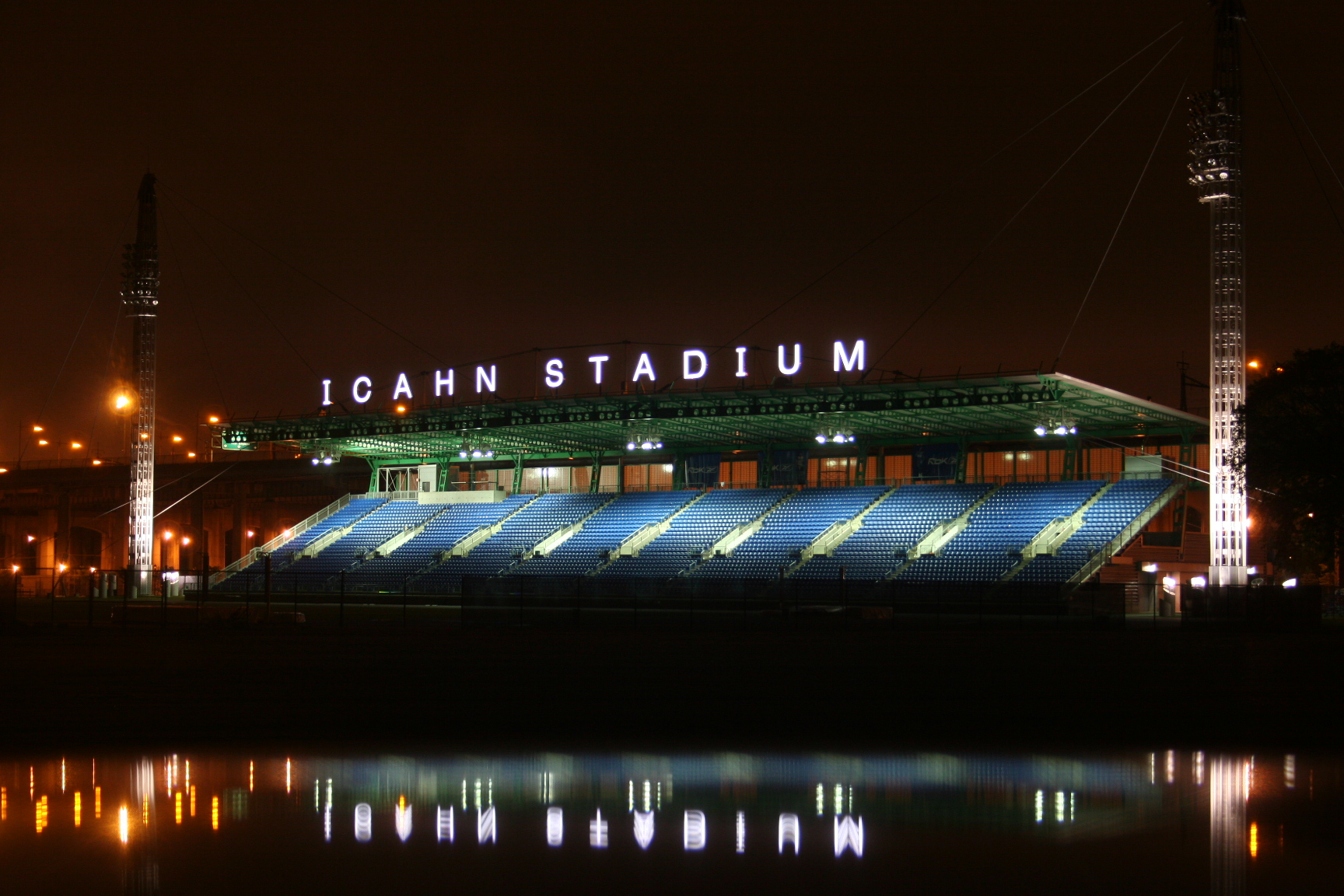
- Dates: July 23–26, 2026
- Host city: New York City, United States
- Venue: Icahn Stadium
- Level: Senior; Para
- Type: Outdoor
- Events: Open: 44 (men: 20; women: 20)

The 2026 USA Outdoor Track and Field Championships was held at Icahn Stadium in New York City from July 23 to 26, 2026. They served as USA Track & Field's (USATF) national championships in track and field for the United States. The results of the event determined national champions and awarded World Athletics Rankings points that allowed athletes to qualify for the 2026 World Athletics Ultimate Championship held in Budapest, Hungary.

It was the first championships in New York City since 1991. The 2026 championships were also the first to replace the 20 km walk and 35 km walk events with the new half marathon walk.

On July 21, New York City mayor Zohran Mamdani announced a lottery for 500 free tickets to the event.

== Qualification ==
Qualifying performances for the championships had to be attained during the following time periods.

- Race walk: January 1, 2025 - July 12, 2026
- 10,000 meters & combined events: May 1, 2026 – July 12, 2026
- All other events: July 1, 2026 – July 12, 2026

Event	Men's auto standard	Women's auto standard	Max entrants	Rounds
100 m	10.05	11.07	32	3
200 m	20.25	22.40	24	2
400 m	44.95	51.00	24	2
800 m	1:45.25	1:59.70	24	2
1500 m	3:34.50 (Mile: 3:51.50)	4:05.00 (Mile: 4:24.00)	36	2
5000 m	13:12.00	15:05.00	24	1
10,000 m	27:45.00	31:30.00	24	1
Half marathon race walk	1:42:30; 20 km walk: 1:36:00; 10 km walk: 46:30; 5 km walk: 22:00	1:55:00; 20 km walk: 1:48:00; 10 km walk: 51:30; 5 km walk: 24:30	15	1
110/100 m hurdles	13.40	12.80	32	3
400 m hurdles	49.60	55.80	24	2
3000 m steeplechase	8:27.00	9:41.00	30	2
High jump	2.26 m (7 ft 4 3/4 in)	1.88 m (6 ft 2 in)	16	1
Pole vault	5.82 m (19 ft 1 in)	4.65 m (15 ft 3 in)	16	1
Long jump	8.10 m (26 ft 6 3/4 in)	6.75 m (22 ft 1 1/2 in)	16	1
Triple jump	16.70 m (54 ft 9 1/4 in)	13.60 m (44 ft 7 1/4 in)	16	1
Shot put	21.10 m (69 ft 2 1/2 in)	19.00 m (62 ft 4 in)	16	1
Discus throw	65.00 m (213 ft 3 in)	62.00 m (203 ft 4 3/4 in)	16	1
Hammer throw	74.50 m (244 ft 5 in)	71.00 m (232 ft 11 1/4 in)	16	1
Javelin throw	78.00 m (255 ft 10 3/4 in)	57.00 m (187 ft 0 in)	16	1
Decathlon/Heptathlon	8100 pts	6200 pts	16	1

== Open results ==
=== Men's track ===
Event	Gold		Silver		Bronze	
100 meters (Wind: (+0.8 m/s))	Noah Lyles	9.79 WL	Ronnie Baker	9.88	Kenny Bednarek	9.88
200 meters (Wind: (+1.5 m/s))	Garrett Kaalund	20.04	Brandon Hicklin	20.29 [.288]	Max Thomas	20.29 [.290]
400 meters	Chris Bailey	44.39	Khaleb McRae	44.41	Demarius Smith	44.54 SB
800 meters	Cooper Lutkenhaus	1:43.48	Wes Ferguson	1:44.55	Hobbs Kessler	1:45.00 SB
1500 meters	Nathan Green	3:50.27	Vincent Ciattei	3:50.32	Rheinhardt Harrison	3:50.65
5000 meters	Vincent Ciattei	13:46.75	Cooper Teare	13:46.88	Samuel Prakel	13:46.93
10,000 meters	Woody Kincaid	30:13.66	Grant Fisher	30:14.46	Drew Bosley	30:20.60
110 meters hurdles (Wind: (+0.5 m/s))	Cordell Tinch	13.00 [.993] SB	Bradley Franklin	13.00 [.997] PB	Kendrick Smallwood	13.11
400 meters hurdles	Christopher Robinson	47.61 SB	James Smith II	48.53 PB	Caleb Dean	48.66
3000 meters steeplechase	Nathan Mountain	8:13.81	Carson Williams	8:13.88 PB	Duncan Hamilton	8:14.05 SB
Half marathon walk	Nick Christie	1:31:57.11	Jordan Crawford	1:36:17.18	Michael Mannozzi	1:50:52

=== Men's field ===
Event	Gold		Silver		Bronze	
High jump	Tyus Wilson	2.29 m (7 ft 6 in) =PB	Scottie Vines	2.26 m (7 ft 4 3/4 in) =SB	Shelby McEwen	2.20 m (7 ft 2 1/2 in)
Pole vault	Chris Nilsen	5.82 m (19 ft 1 in)	Sam Kendricks	5.82 m (19 ft 1 in)	Zach Bradford	5.72 m (18 ft 9 in)
Long jump	Isaac Grimes	8.18 m (26 ft 10 in) SB (Wind: (+0.7 m/s))	Malcolm Clemons	8.07 m (26 ft 5 1/2 in) SB (Wind: (+0.7 m/s))	Steffin Mccarter	7.97 m (26 ft 1 3/4 in) (Wind: (+1.1 m/s))
Triple jump	Salif Mane	16.66 m (54 ft 7 3/4 in) (Wind: (−4.4 m/s))	Russell Robinson	16.66 m (54 ft 7 3/4 in) (Wind: (−0.8 m/s))	James Carter Jr	16.15 m (52 ft 11 3/4 in) (Wind: (−1.3 m/s))
Shot put	Jordan Geist	22.32 m (73 ft 2 1/2 in)	Tripp Piperi	21.91 m (71 ft 10 1/2 in) SB	Payton Otterdahl	21.65 m (71 ft 1/4 in)
Discus throw	Texas Tanner	65.46 m (214 ft 9 in)	Reggie Jagers	64.00 m (209 ft 11 in)	Mitchell Weber	63.84 m (209 ft 5 in)
Hammer throw	Rudy Winkler	77.05 m (252 ft 9 in)	Alex Young	74.93 m (245 ft 10 in)	Trey Knight	73.70 m (241 ft 9 in)
Javelin throw	Curtis Thompson	87.59 m (287 ft 4 in) SB	Jordan Davis	82.36 m (270 ft 2 in) SB	Marc Minichello	75.98 m (249 ft 3 in)
Decathlon	Garrett Scantling	8526 pts	Kyle Garland	8431 pts	Hakim McMorris	8312 pts

=== Women's track ===
Event	Gold		Silver		Bronze	
100 meters (Wind: (+0.9 m/s))	Sha'Carri Richardson	10.77 =SB	Kayla White	10.90 SB	Tamari Davis	11.00
200 meters	Melissa Jefferson-Wooden	21.69 SB	Cambrea Sturgis	22.22	Camryn Dickson	22.58
400 meters	Aaliyah Butler	49.93	Alexis Holmes	50.47	Sanaria Butler	50.89
800 meters	Nia Akins	1:59.25 SB	Addy Wiley	1:59.40	Meghan Hunter	1:59.67
1500 meters	Nikki Hiltz	4:06.92	Addy Wiley	4:06.96	Emily Mackay	4:06.98
5000 meters	Emily Mackay	14:55.82 SB	Shelby Houlihan	14:57.88	Parker Valby	15:06.25
10,000 meters	Sydney Vaught	33:30.60	Katie Izzo	33:36.98	Allie Buchalski	33:42.29
100 meters hurdles (Wind: (+0.0 m/s))	Alia Armstrong	12.38 SB	Alaysha Johnson	12.42	Tara Davis-Woodhall	12.57
400 meters hurdles	Anna Cockrell	52.94	Deonca Bookman	53.95 PB	Shamier Little	54.37
3000 meters steeplechase	Lexy Halladay-Lowry	9:12.54 SB	Gabbi Jennings	9:17.42	Madie Boreman	9:17.68 PB
Half marathon walk	Lauren Harris	1:38:35.56	Maria Michta-Coffey	1:47:44	Angelica Harris	1:49:03

=== Women's field ===
Event	Gold		Silver		Bronze	
High jump	Vashti Cunningham	1.92 m (6 ft 3 1/2 in)	Charity Hufnagel	1.92 m (6 ft 3 1/2 in)	Sanaa Barnes	1.89 m (6 ft 2 1/4 in)
Pole vault	Sandi Morris	4.90 m (16 ft 3/4 in) SB	Emily Grove	4.70 m (15 ft 5 in) =SB	Tori Thomas	4.60 m (15 ft 1 in) PB
Long jump	Alyssa Jones	6.96 m (22 ft 10 in) (Wind: (+0.2 m/s))	Monae' Nichols	6.92 m (22 ft 8 1/4 in) (Wind: (+0.3 m/s))	Tara Davis-Woodhall	6.90 m (22 ft 7 1/2 in) (Wind: (−1.0 m/s))
Triple jump	Euphenie Andre	13.94 m (45 ft 8 3/4 in) (Wind: (+1.1 m/s)) PB	Kayla Woods	13.75 m (45 ft 1 1/4 in) (Wind: (+0.7 m/s)) PB	Kayla Pinkard	13.48 m (44 ft 2 1/2 in) (Wind: (+2.0 m/s))
Shot put	Chase Jackson	20.55 m (67 ft 5 in)	Abria Smith	19.31 m (63 ft 4 in) PB	Adelaide Aquilla	18.74 m (61 ft 5 3/4 in)
Discus throw	Valarie Sion	69.54 m (228 ft 1 3/4 in)	Cierra Jackson	67.40 m (221 ft 1 1/2 in)	Erika Beistle	65.29 m (214 ft 2 1/4 in)
Hammer throw	Annette Echikunwoke	75.47 m (247 ft 7 in)	Rachel Richeson	73.02 m (239 ft 6 in)	Erin Reese	72.94 m (239 ft 3 in)
Javelin throw	Madison Wiltrout	61.53 m (201 ft 10 in)	Evie Bliss	60.41 m (198 ft 2 in)	Madelyn Harris	57.14 m (187 ft 5 in)
Heptathlon	Erin Marsh	6059 pts	Timara Chapman	6021 pts	Lauren Taubert	5971 pts

== Other results ==
=== Youth ===
Event	Gold		Silver		Bronze	
800 meters	Saul Barone	2:18.08	Ethan Riordan	2:23.54	Kavin Jagetia	2:25.38

=== Masters ===
Event	Gold		Silver		Bronze	
Men's 100m Hurdles	Fan Qingxue	14.47	Brian Bombei	14.56	Kevin Bosma	14.62
Women's 80m Hurdles	Allison Murphy	12.35	Rachel Guest	13.03	Andrea Collier	13.05

== Notes ==
Regardless of World Athletics Rankings scores, winners of three other championship events will be automatically selected by World Athletics to the 2026 World Athletics Ultimate Championship. Only results from events to be staged at the Ultimate Championships will be considered.

- Athletics at the 2024 Summer Olympics winners
  - Men
    - Noah Lyles - 100 m
    - Quincy Hall - 400 m
    - Cole Hocker - 1500 m
    - Grant Holloway - 110 m hurdles
    - Rai Benjamin - 400 m hurdles
  - Women
    - Gabrielle Thomas - 200 m
    - Masai Russell - 100 m hurdles
    - Sydney McLaughlin-Levrone - 400 m hurdles
    - Tara Davis-Woodhall - Long jump
- 2025 World Athletics Championships winners
  - Men
    - Noah Lyles - 200 m
    - Cole Hocker - 5000 m
    - Cordell Tinch - 110 m hurdles
    - Rai Benjamin - 400 m hurdles
  - Women
    - Melissa Jefferson-Wooden - 100 m
    - Melissa Jefferson-Wooden - 200 m
    - Sydney McLaughlin-Levrone - 400 m
    - Katie Moon - Pole vault
    - Tara Davis-Woodhall - Long jump
- 2026 Diamond League overall points winners
