= 600 metres =

Infrequently contested athletics distance

Athletics 600 metres

World records
- Men: (United States) Johnny Gray 1:12.81 (1986)
- Women: (Kenya) Mary Moraa 1:21.63 (2024)

Short track world records
- Men: Josh Hoey (USA) 1:12.84 (2025)
- Women: Keely Hodgkinson (GBR) 1:23.41 (2023)

The 600 metres is a rarely run middle-distance running event in track and field competitions. It is most often run at high school indoor track and field competitions. It is also run at the Penn Relays.

== All-time top 25 ==
- i = indoor performance
- A = affected by altitude
- h = hand timing

=== Men (outdoor) ===
- Correct as of August 2026.

Ath.#	Perf.#	Time	Athlete	Nation	Date	Place	Ref.
1	1	1:12.81	Johnny Gray	United States	24 May 1986	Santa Monica	
2	2	1:13.10	David Rudisha	Kenya	5 June 2016	Birmingham	
3	3	1:13.21	Pierre-Ambroise Bosse	France	5 June 2016	Birmingham	
4	4	1:13.28	Duane Solomon	United States	1 July 2013	Burnaby	
5	5	1:13.49	Joseph Mutua Mwengi	Kenya	27 August 2002	Liège	
6	6	1:13.53	Eliott Crestan	Belgium	15 July 2026	Naimette-Xhovémont	
	7	1:13.71	Rudisha #2		24 August 2014	Birmingham	
	8	1:13.72	Mutua Mwengi #2		2 September 2003	Naimette-Xhovémont	
7	9	1:13.80	Earl Jones	United States	24 May 1986	Santa Monica	
8	10	1:13.9 h	Raidel Acea	Cuba	20 April 2013	La Habana	
9	11	1:13.97	Ryan Sánchez	Puerto Rico	18 March 2023	Carolina	
	12	1:13.99	Sánchez #2		19 March 2022	Carolina	
10	13	1:14.01	Gabriel Tual	France	31 May 2025	Nice	
11	14	1:14.15	David Mack	United States	24 May 1986	Santa Monica	
	15	1:14.16	Gray #2		21 July 1984	Sacramento	
12	16	1:14.3 h A	Lee Evans	United States	31 August 1968	Echo Summit	
13	17	1:14.33	Charles Jock	United States	24 June 2015	Portland	
14	18	1:14.34 A	Slimane Moula	Algeria	27 January 2026	Potchefstroom	
15	19	1:13.35	Nicholas Kiplagat	Kenya	15 July 2026	Naimette-Xhovémont	
16	20	1:14.36	Djamel Sedjati	Algeria	11 March 2023	Sasolburg	
16	20	1:14.36	Michael Cherry	United States	18 March 2023	Carolina	
18	22	1:14.41	Andrea Longo	Italy	30 August 2000	Rovereto	
18	22	1:14.41	Matt Scherer	United States	15 June 2008	Eugene	
	24	1:14.43	Solomon #2		29 March 2014	Orlando	
20	25	1:14.47	Nick Symmonds	United States	15 June 2008	Eugene	
	25	1:14.47	Crestan #2		19 June 2024	Naimette-Xhovémont	
21		1:14.48	Trinity Gray	United States	30 August 2000	Rovereto	
21		1:14.48	Tibo de Smet	Belgium	15 July 2026	Naimette-Xhovémont	
23		1:14.55	Adam Kszczot	Poland	5 August 2009	Lahti	
24		1:14.56	Tobias Grønstad	Norway	5 May 2024	Pliezhausen	
25		1:14.72	André Bucher	Switzerland	1 September 1999	Bellinzona	
25		1:14.72	Gary Reed	Canada	2 September 2003	Naimette-Xhovémont	

=== Men (indoor) ===
- Correct as of February 2026.

Ath.#	Perf.#	Time	Athlete	Nation	Date	Place	Ref.
1	1	1:12.84	Josh Hoey	United States	6 December 2025	Boston	
2	2	1:13.77	Donavan Brazier	United States	24 February 2019	New York	
	3	1:13.97	Brazier #2		11 February 2022	Spokane	
3	4	1:14.03 A	Brandon Miller	United States	9 February 2024	Albuquerque	
4	5	1:14.04	Will Sumner	United States	8 February 2025	New York City	
5	6	1:14.15	Cooper Lutkenhaus	United States	1 February 2026	New York City	
6	7	1:14.17	Isaiah Jewett	United States	8 February 2025	New York City	
	8	1:14.37	Miller #2		8 February 2025	New York City	
	9	1:14.39	Brazier #3		25 January 2020	Boston	
7	10	1:14.67	Miles Brown	United States	27 February 2026	Indianapolis	
8	11	1:14.77	Jenoah McKiver	United States	1 February 2026	New York City	
9	12	1:14.79 A	Michael Saruni	Kenya	19 January 2018	Albuquerque	
10	13	1:14.88	Oussama El Bouchayby	Morocco	27 January 2024	Clemson	
11	14	1:14.89	Handal Roban	Saint Vincent and the Grenadines	7 February 2026	State College	
12	15	1:14.90	Alex Amankwa	Ghana	31 January 2025	State College	
13	16	1:14.91	Casimir Loxsom	United States	28 January 2017	University Park	
14	17	1:14.92	Eliott Crestan	Belgium	25 January 2025	Louvain-la-Neuve	
15	18	1:14.95	Isaiah Harris	United States	11 February 2022	Spokane	
	19	1:14.96	Harris #2		28 January 2017	University Park	
16	20	1:14.97 A	Emmanuel Korir	Kenya	20 January 2017	Albuquerque	
17	21	1:15.07 A	Erik Sowinski	United States	5 March 2017	Albuquerque	
18	22	1:15.09	Saveliy Savlukov	Russia	7 January 2024	Yekaterinburg	
18	22	1:15.09	Yanis Meziane	France	8 February 2025	Metz	
20	24	1:15.12	Nico Motchebon	Germany	28 February 1999	Sindelfingen	
20	24	1:15.12 A	Jonathan Jones	Barbados	4 February 2022	Albuquerque	
22		1:15.16	Devon Dixon	United States	31 January 2020	Lubbock	
23		1:15.18	Christopher Bailey	United States	13 January 2023	Fayetteville	
24		1:15.19	William Jones	United States	16 January 2026	Spokane	
25		1:15.20	Samuel Ellison	United States	24 February 2019	New York	

=== Women (outdoor) ===
- Correct as of June 2026.

Ath.#	Perf.#	Time	Athlete	Nation	Date	Place	Ref.
1	1	1:21.63	Mary Moraa	Kenya	1 September 2024	Berlin	
2	2	1:21.77	Caster Semenya	South Africa	27 August 2017	Berlin	
3	3	1:22.39	Ajee' Wilson	United States	27 August 2017	Berlin	
4	4	1:22.63	Ana Fidelia Quirot	Cuba	25 July 1997	Guadalajara	
5	5	1:22.74	Athing Mu	United States	30 April 2022	Philadelphia	
6	6	1:22.85	Audrey Werro	Switzerland	23 June 2026	Biel	
7	7	1:22.87	Maria Mutola	Mozambique	27 August 2002	Liège	
8	8	1:22.98	Shafiqua Maloney	St. Vincent and Grenadines	1 September 2024	Berlin	
	9	1:23.13	Mutola #2		2 September 2003	Naimette-Xhovémont	
9	10	1:23.18	Francine Niyonsaba	Burundi	27 August 2017	Berlin	
10	11	1:23.35	Pamela Jelimo	Kenya	5 July 2012	Liège	
11	12	1:23.45	Paris Peoples	United States	4 April 2026	Miramar	
	13	1:23.51	Maloney #2		4 April 2026	Miramar	
12	14	1:23.78	Natalya Khrushcheleva	Russia	2 September 2003	Naimette-Xhovémont	
	15	1:23.80	Maloney #3		6 April 2024	Miramar	
13	16	1:24.09	Natoya Goule	Jamaica	30 April 2022	Philadelphia	
	17	1:24.13	Mu #2		19 March 2022	Tempe	
14	18	1:24.36	Marilyn Okoro	Great Britain	5 July 2012	Liège	
	19	1:24.45	Wilson #2		29 April 2023	Philadelphia	
15	20	1:24.53	Bendere Oboya	Australia	18 June 2024	Bilbao	
16	21	1:24.56	Martina Kämpfert-Steuk	East Germany	1 August 1981	Erfurt	
	22	1:24.61	Maloney #4		5 April 2025	Miramar	
17	23	1:24.62	Assia Raziki	Morocco	19 June 2022	Rabat	
18	24	1:24.77	Michelle Ballentine	Jamaica	3 August 2004	Naimette-Xhovémont	
19	25	1:24.84	Tharushi Karunarathna	Sri Lanka	18 June 2024	Bilbao	
20		1:24.85	Ines Vogelgesang	East Germany	31 July 1983	Berlin	
21		1:24.88	Alica Schmidt	Germany	1 September 2024	Berlin	
22		1:24.94	Nelly Jepkosgei	Bahrain	1 September 2024	Berlin	
23		1:25.04	Joanna Jóźwik	Poland	9 August 2015	Szczecin	
24		1:25.05	Luciana de Paula Mendes	Brazil	3 August 2004	Naimette-Xhovémont	
25		1:25.22	Sophia Gorriaran	United States	30 April 2022	Philadelphia	

=== Women (indoor) ===
- Correct as of January 2026.

Ath.#	Perf.#	Time	Athlete	Nation	Date	Place	Ref.
1	1	1:23.41	Keely Hodgkinson	Great Britain	28 January 2023	Manchester	
2	2	1:23.44	Olga Kotlyarova	Russia	1 February 2004	Moscow	
3	3	1:23.57	Athing Mu	United States	24 February 2019	New York City	
4	4	1:23.59	Alysia Montaño	United States	16 February 2013	New York City	
5	5	1:23.84	Ajee' Wilson	United States	5 March 2017	Albuquerque	
6	6	1:24.00	Courtney Okolo	United States	5 March 2017	Albuquerque	
7	7	1:24.02	Yuliya Stepanova	Russia	6 February 2011	Moscow	
8	8	1:24.19	Sanu Jallow	The Gambia	16 January 2026	Fayetteville	
9	9	1:24.32	Nia Akins	United States	9 February 2024	Albuquerque	
10	10	1:24.44	Kelly-Ann Beckford	Jamaica	31 January 2026	State College	
	11	1:24.48	Wilson #2		4 February 2017	New York City	
11	12	1:24.60	Shafiqua Maloney	St. Vincent and Grenadines	17 January 2025	Fayetteville	
12	13	1:24.65	Shamier Little	United States	13 January 2023	Fayetteville	
13	14	1:24.71	Valery Tobias	United States	30 January 2026	Albuquerque	
	15	1:24.85	Wilson #3		11 February 2023	New York City	
14	16	1:24.87	Roisin Willis	United States	1 February 2026	New York City	
15	17	1:24.88	Raevyn Rogers	United States	24 February 2019	New York City	
16	18	1:24.99	Taiya Shelby	United States	31 January 2026	State College	
17	19	1:25.06	Rebecca Grieve	Great Britain	30 January 2026	Albuquerque	
18	20	1:25.15	Natalya Khrushcheleva	Russia	1 February 2004	Moscow	
19	21	1:25.16	Britton Wilson	United States	13 January 2023	Fayetteville	
	22	1:25.20	Akins #2		11 February 2023	Albuquerque	
	23	1:25.21	Okolo #2		4 February 2017	Lincoln	
20	24	1:25.23	Tatyana Firova	Russia	27 January 2008	Moscow	
	24	1:25.23	Wilson #4		20 January 2017	New York City	
21		1:25.35	Natoya Goule	Jamaica	17 February 2017	Clemson	
22		1:25.46	Lyubov Tsyoma	Soviet Union	15 February 1987	Moscow	
22		1:25.46	Kendra Chambers	United States	5 March 2017	Albuquerque	
24		1:25.64	Juliette Whittaker	United States	1 February 2026	New York City	
25		1:25.68	Nadezhda Olizarenko	Soviet Union	25 February 1989	Moscow	
