= 2025 World Athletics Indoor Championships – Men's 60 metres =

Men's 60 metres at the 2025 World Athletics Indoor Championships
- Venue: Nanjing's Cube at Nanjing Youth Olympic Sports Park
- Location: Nanjing, China
- Dates: 21 March
- Winning time: 6.49

Medalists
gold medal	Jeremiah Azu	Great Britain
silver medal	Lachlan Kennedy	Australia
bronze medal	Akani Simbine	South Africa

The men's 60 metres at the 2025 World Athletics Indoor Championships took place on the short track of the Nanjing's Cube at Nanjing Youth Olympic Sports Park in Nanjing, China, on 21 March 2025. This was the 21st time the event had been contested at the World Athletics Indoor Championships. Athletes could qualify by achieving the entry standard or by their World Athletics Ranking in the event.

== Background ==
The men's 60 metres was contested 20 times before 2025, at every previous edition of the World Athletics Indoor Championships.

Records before the 2025 World Athletics Indoor Championships
Record	Athlete (nation)	Time (s)	Location	Date
World record	Christian Coleman (USA)	6.34	Albuquerque, United States	18 February 2018
Championship record	Christian Coleman (USA)	6.37	Birmingham, United Kingdom	3 March 2018
World leading	JC Stevenson (USA)	6.46	Virginia Beach, United States	14 March 2025

== Qualification ==
For the men's 60 metres, the qualification period ran from 1 September 2024 until 9 March 2025. Athletes could qualify by achieving the entry standards of 6.55 s. Athletes could also qualify by virtue of their World Athletics Ranking for the event or by virtue of their World Athletics Indoor Tour wildcard. There is a target number of 56 athletes.

== Results ==
=== Heats ===
The heats were held on 21 March, starting at 12:55 (UTC+8) in the morning. First 2 of each heat (Q) plus 8 fastest times (q) qualified to the semi-finals.

==== Heat 1 ====
Place	Lane	Athlete	Nation	Time	Notes
1	6	Akani Simbine	South Africa	6.57	Q, =SB
2	3	Deng Xinrui	China	6.64	Q
3	8	Norris Spike	Canada	6.74	
4	2	Favoris Muzrapov	Tajikistan	6.86	
5	7	Ján Volko	Slovakia	6.87	
6	4	Aayush Kunwar	Nepal	7.16	SB
7	5	Andrew Robertson	Great Britain	17.86	

==== Heat 2 ====
Place	Lane	Athlete	Nation	Time	Notes
1	3	Coby Hilton	United States	6.70 [.693]	Q
2	2	William Reais	Switzerland	6.70 [.697]	Q
2	6	Chamod Yodasinghe	Sri Lanka	6.70 [.697]	Q
4	1	Joshua Azzopardi	Australia	6.70 [.698]	
5	7	Adas Dambrauskas	Lithuania	6.76	
6	5	Thiago Prata	Brazil	6.81	
7	4	Luke Haga	Solomon Islands	7.30	PB
8	8	Joe Sika	Tonga	7.97	PB

==== Heat 3 ====
Place	Lane	Athlete	Nation	Time	Notes
1	8	Rikkoi Brathwaite	British Virgin Islands	6.64	Q
2	5	Guillem Crespí	Spain	6.67	Q
3	2	Nishion Ebanks	Jamaica	6.70	
4	4	Franco Florio	Argentina	6.76	
5	7	Beppe Grillo	Malta	6.87	
6	6	Hassan Saaid	Maldives	7.05	
7	3	Stanislaus Kostka	Federated States of Micronesia	7.43	PB

==== Heat 4 ====
Place	Lane	Athlete	Nation	Time	Notes
1	5	Eloy Benitez	Puerto Rico	6.49	Q, NR
2	4	Ali Al-Balushi	Oman	6.58	Q
3	3	Naoki Nishioka	Japan	6.67	q
4	6	Marc Brian Louis	Singapore	6.68	NR
5	7	Yassin Bandaogo	Italy	6.74	
6	8	Roberts Jānis Zālītis	Latvia	6.78	
7	2	Reita Kakianako	Kiribati	7.47	PB

==== Heat 5 ====
Place	Lane	Athlete	Nation	Time	Notes
1	3	Ronnie Baker	United States	6.56	Q
2	6	Malachi Murray	Canada	6.63	Q
3	2	Xie Zhenye	China	6.64	q
4	8	Pais Wisil	Papua New Guinea	6.66	q
5	5	Eino Vuori	Finland	6.77	
6	7	Andro Grigorjan	Georgia	7.03	
7	4	Daniel Tolosa	Cook Islands	7.12	NR

==== Heat 6 ====
Place	Lane	Athlete	Nation	Time	Notes
1	5	Jeremiah Azu	Great Britain	6.53	Q
2	7	Julian Forde	Barbados	6.57	Q, PB
3	6	Arthur Cissé	Ivory Coast	6.65	q
4	2	Emmanuel Wells	United States	6.76	
5	3	Mustafa Kemal Ay	Turkey	6.77	
6	8	Raihau Maiau	French Polynesia	6.85	SB
7	4	Winzar Kakiouea	Nauru	7.09	

==== Heat 7 ====
Place	Lane	Athlete	Nation	Time	Notes
1	4	Lachlan Kennedy	Australia	6.52	Q
2	5	Tiaan Whelpton	New Zealand	6.62	Q
3	8	Stephen Awuah Baffour	Italy	6.66	q
4	1	Ertan Özkan	Turkey	6.75	
5	7	Chan Yat Lok	Hong Kong	6.81	
6	2	Chan Kin Wa	Macau	6.94	
7	3	Johnny Key	Samoa	7.04	PB
8	6	Rizan Leo Rara	Vanuatu	7.17	PB

==== Heat 8 ====
Place	Lane	Athlete	Nation	Time	Notes
1	5	Rohan Watson	Jamaica	6.54	Q
2	2	Yoshiki Kinashi	Japan	6.60	Q, PB
3	8	Dominik Illovszky	Hungary	6.63	q
4	7	Mamadou Fall Sarr	Senegal	6.67	q
5	4	Nikola Karamanolov	Bulgaria	6.71	
6	3	Waisele Inoke	Fiji	6.94	
7	6	Sorsy Phompakdi	Laos	7.04	NR

=== Semi-finals ===
The semi-finals started at 20:05 (UTC+8). First 2 in each heat (Q) and the next 2 fastest (q) advanced to the final.

==== Heat 1 ====
Place	Lane	Athlete	Nation	Time	Notes
1	4	Jeremiah Azu	Great Britain	6.52	Q
2	6	Rohan Watson	Jamaica	6.58	Q
3	5	Julian Forde	Barbados	6.59	q
4	3	Ali Al Balushi	Oman	6.61	
5	7	Guillem Crespi	Spain	6.64	
6	1	Stephen Awuah Baffour	Italy	6.67	
7	2	William Reais	Switzerland	6.72	
8	8	Pais Wisil	Papua New Guinea	6.73	

==== Heat 2 ====
Place	Lane	Athlete	Nation	Time	Notes
1	6	Ronnie Baker	United States	6.51	Q
2	5	Lachlan Kennedy	Australia	6.54	Q
3	2	Deng Xinrui	China	6.61	
4	4	Rikkoi Brathwaite	British Virgin Islands	6.63 [.621]	
5	3	Yoshiki Kinashi	Japan	6.63 [.630]	
6	8	Arthur Cissé	Ivory Coast	6.67	
7	1	Mamadou Fall Sarr	Senegal	6.68	
8	7	Chamod Yodasinghe	Sri Lanka	6.70	

==== Heat 3 ====
Place	Lane	Athlete	Nation	Time	Notes
1	5	Eloy Benitez	Puerto Rico	6.52	Q
2	3	Akani Simbine	South Africa	6.53	Q, PB
3	1	Xie Zhenye	China	6.60	q, SB
4	8	Naoki Nishioka	Japan	6.62	
5	2	Dominik Illovszky	Hungary	6.63	
6	7	Malachi Murray	Canada	6.65	
7	6	Coby Hilton	United States	6.67	
8	4	Tiaan Whelpton	New Zealand	6.70	

=== Final ===
The final was started at 21:25 (UTC+8).

Rank	Lane	Name	Nationality	Time	Notes
1st place, gold medalist(s)	6	Jeremiah Azu	Great Britain	6.49	=PB
2nd place, silver medalist(s)	2	Lachlan Kennedy	Australia	6.50	
3rd place, bronze medalist(s)	3	Akani Simbine	South Africa	6.54	
4	1	Xie Zhenye	China	6.58	SB
5	7	Rohan Watson	Jamaica	6.59 [.585]	
6	4	Ronnie Baker	United States	6.59 [.586]	
7	8	Julian Forde	Barbados	6.64	
—	5	Eloy Benitez	Puerto Rico	DNF	
