= Isaac Grimes =

American long jumper

Personal information
- Born: 7 February 1998 (age 28)

Sport
- Sport: Athletics
- Event: Long jump

Achievements and titles
- Personal best: Long jump: 8.35m (2021)

Isaac Grimes (born 7 February 1998) is an American long jumper. He won the 2025 and 2026 USA Outdoor Track and Field Championships, having previously finished as runner-up at the USA Indoor Championships in 2024, and in 2022 at the NCAA Indoor and the NCAA Outdoor Championships.

== NCAA ==
He grew in Moreno Valley, California and then attended college at Chadron State College in Nebraska. He won the NCAA Div. II title in the long jump and excelled at the long jump and triple jump both indoors and outdoors. After two seasons he transferred to Florida State University in 2020 for whom, at the Tyson Invitational in Arkansas passed Ngoni Makusha's mark for the longest jump in college history with 8.33 metres. He then jumped 8.35 metres in Fayetteville, Arkansas to finish runner up at the 2021 NCAA Indoor Championships to JuVaughn Harrison. In June 2021, he jumped 8.05 metres to finish runner up to Harrison again at the 2021 NCAA Division I Outdoor Track and Field Championships.

== Professional career ==
=== 2024 ===
He jumped 7.74 metres to finish runner-up to Wayne Pinnock the University of New Mexico Collegiate Classic at the Albuquerque, New Mexico in February 2024. He jumped 8.06 metres to finish runner-up at the USA Indoor Championships in Alburquerque, late that month.

In June 2024, he jumped 8.11 metres to finish fifth at the US Olympic Trials in Eugene, Oregon.

=== 2025 ===
He finished third in the long jump in Astana on the 2025 World Athletics Indoor Tour with 7.89 metres, behind Lester Lescay and Marquis Dendy, with just two centimetres separating the top three. That month, he finished runner-up on the World Athletics Indoor Tour event in Belgrade with a jump of 8.13 metres. He jumped 7.81 metres to finish in sixth place at the 2025 USA Indoor Track and Field Championships in February 2025.

He finished sixth at the 2025 Xiamen Diamond League event in China, with a best jump of 7.78 metres. On 1 August, he jumped 8.15 metres to win the 2025 USA Outdoor Track and Field Championships in Eugene, Oregon.

In September 2025, he competed at the 2025 World Championships in Tokyo, Japan, qualifying for the final and placing tenth overall.

=== 2026 ===
On 1 March 2026, he jumped 8.00 metres to finish third behind Steffin McCarter and Jeremiah Davis at the 2026 USA Indoor Track and Field Championships.

On 23 July 2026, Grimes retained his title at the 2026 USA Outdoor Track and Field Championships in New York. In doing so, he became the first person since 2011 to win the long jump in consecutive years.
