= Maggi Congdon =

American middle-distance runner (born 2002)

Personal information
- Nationality: United States
- Born: 23 July 2002 (age 23)
- Home town: Steamboat Springs, Colorado
- Education: Northern Arizona University '25 BS Civil engineering Steamboat Springs High School '20

Sport
- Country: United States
- Sport: Athletics
- Event: Middle-distance running
- Club: Nike Swoosh
- Turned pro: 2025
- Coached by: Mike Smith

Achievements and titles
- Personal best(s): 800m: 1:58.42 (Eugene, 2025); 1500m: 4:02.79 (Eugene, 2024); Mile: 4:27.77 (Seattle, 2025)

Maggi Congdon (born 23 July 2002) is an American middle-distance runner. She was runner-up over 800 metres at the 2025 USA Outdoor Track and Field Championships and competed for the United States at the 2025 World Championships.

== Early life ==
From Steamboat Springs, Colorado, she graduated from Steamboat Springs High School in 2020. As well as running track in high school, she also participated in cross country running. She committed in November 2019 to run in the collegiate system after being inspired by local track coach Renee Tumminello.

representing Steamboat Springs High School
2019 New Balance Nationals Outdoor Track and Field Championships	1500 m	4:42.19	10th
2019 New Balance Nationals Outdoor Track and Field Championships	Mile	5:02.19	10th
2019 Colorado High School Activities Association Outdoor Track and Field Championships	1600 m	5:07.92	7th
2019 Colorado High School Activities Association Outdoor Track and Field Championships	800 m	2:13.35	(silver) 2nd
2019 Colorado High School Activities Association Outdoor Track and Field Championships	4x800 m relay	3:37.36	4th
2018 Colorado High School Activities Association Outdoor Track and Field Championships	1600 m	5:06.52	(gold) 1st
2018 Colorado High School Activities Association Outdoor Track and Field Championships	800 m	2:14.07	(gold) 1st
2017 Colorado High School Activities Association Outdoor Track and Field Championships	1600 m	5:10.07	4th
2017 Colorado High School Activities Association Outdoor Track and Field Championships	800 m	2:18.33	5th

== NCAA ==
Maggi Congdon is a 6-time NCAA Division I All-American and 12-time Big Sky Conference champion. She graduated from Northern Arizona University in 2025 with a degree in civil engineering. She was a finalist in the 1500 metres at the 2024 NCAA Outdoor Championships, in Eugene, Oregon, where she had a ninth-place finish in a time of 4:07.81. In June 2024, she lowered her personal best to 4:02.79 to reach the final of the 1500 metres at the US Olympic Trials, the only college athlete to reach the final of the event that year. In September 2024, she signed an NIL deal with Hoka.

In February 2025, she ran 4:27.77 indoors in the mile run in Seattle, Washington. The following month, she placed third indoors at the 2025 NCAA Indoor Championships in the Mike, behind Wilma Nielsen and Mena Scatchard in Virginia Beach on 15 March.

In June 2025, Congdon, finished third in the women’s 1500 metres at the 2025 NCAA Outdoor Championships in Eugene with a time of 4:09.31.

representing Northern Arizona Lumberjacks
2025 NCAA Division I Outdoor Track and Field Championships	1500 m	4:09.31	(bronze) 3rd
2025 Big Sky Conference Outdoor Track and Field Championships	1500 m	4:21.09	(silver) 2nd
2025 Big Sky Conference Outdoor Track and Field Championships	800 m	2:04.57	(gold) 1st
2025 Big Sky Conference Outdoor Track and Field Championships	4x400 m relay	3:34.23	(gold) 1st
2025 NCAA Division I Indoor Track and Field Championships	Mile	4:32.88	(bronze) 3rd
2025 Big Sky Conference Indoor Track and Field Championships	400 m	53.73	5th
2025 Big Sky Conference Indoor Track and Field Championships	4x400 m relay	3:35.48	(gold) 1st
2025 Big Sky Conference Indoor Track and Field Championships	Mile	4:50.73	(gold) 1st
2025 Big Sky Conference Indoor Track and Field Championships	Distance medley relay	11:46.25	(gold) 1st
2024 NCAA Division I Outdoor Track and Field Championships	1500 m	4:10.41	9th
2024 NCAA Division I Outdoor Track and Field Championships	4x400 m relay	3:31.28	14th
2024 Big Sky Conference Outdoor Track and Field Championships	1500 m	4:21.93	(bronze) 3rd
2024 Big Sky Conference Outdoor Track and Field Championships	800 m	2:06.38	(gold) 1st
2024 Big Sky Conference Outdoor Track and Field Championships	4x400 m relay	3:34.54	(gold) 1st
2024 NCAA Division I Indoor Track and Field Championships	Mile	4:36.71	9th
2024 NCAA Division I Indoor Track and Field Championships	800 m	2:06.41	8th
2024 Big Sky Conference Indoor Track and Field Championships	800 m	2:05.24	(gold) 1st
2024 Big Sky Conference Indoor Track and Field Championships	4x400 m relay	3:38.59	(gold) 1st
2024 Big Sky Conference Indoor Track and Field Championships	Distance medley relay	11:38.55	(gold) 1st
2023 Big Sky Conference Indoor Track and Field Championships	800 m	2:05.71	(gold) 1st
2022 NCAA Division I Outdoor Track and Field Championships	800 m	2:05.38	33rd
2022 Big Sky Conference Outdoor Track and Field Championships	1500 m	4:26.83	(silver) 2nd
2022 Big Sky Conference Outdoor Track and Field Championships	800 m	2:09.22	(silver) 2nd
2021 NCAA Division I Outdoor Track and Field Championships	800 m	2:07.47	66th
2021 Big Sky Conference Outdoor Track and Field Championships	800 m	2:09.77	(gold) 1st

== Professional ==
In July 2025, she signed a contract to run as a professional with Nike. She lowered her personal best to 1:58.55 to finish second behind Meghan Hunter in the 800 metres at the Sunset Tour Los Angeles on 12 July 2025. She reached the final of the 800 metres at the 2025 USA Outdoor Track and Field Championships in Eugene, Oregon, running a personal best 1:58.42 in the semi-final to beat Raevyn Rogers on the line. In the final, she finished runner-up behind Roisin Willis in 1:59.39 after closing strongly to go from sixth to second.

In September 2025, she was a semi-finalist in the women's 800 metres at the 2025 World Athletics Championships in Tokyo, Japan.

On 17 January, Condon opened her 2026 indoor season competing as a member of Nike's Swoosh TC and won the women's mile in 4:27.77 and the 800 meters in 2:00.93, to set two meet records in the space of as many hours, at the Washington Preview in Seattle. On 1 February 2026, placed third behind Addy Wiley and Tsige Duguma over 1000 metres at the Millrose Games in 2:35.91. She was a finalist in the 800 metres at the 2026 USA Indoor Track and Field Championships in New York, placing fourth overall.
