= 2025 USA Indoor Track and Field Championships =

2025 USA Track & Field Indoor Championships
- Dates: February 22–23
- Host city: New York City, New York
- Venue: Ocean Breeze Athletic Complex
- Level: Senior
- Type: Indoor
- Events: 28 (men: 14; women: 14)

The 2025 USA Indoor Track and Field Championships were held at the Ocean Breeze Athletic Complex on Staten Island, New York City from February 22–23. Organized by USA Track and Field (USATF), it served as the indoor United States national championships in track and field and selection meet for the 2025 World Athletics Indoor Championships in Nanjing, China.

== Medal summary ==
=== Men's track ===
Event	Gold		Silver		Bronze	
60 meters	Ronnie Baker	6.52	Colby Hilton	6.58 (6.573)	Emmanuel Wells	6.58 (6.577)
60 meter hurdles	Grant Holloway	7.36	Cameron Murray	7.41	Johnny Brackins	7.43
400 meters	Chris Bailey	45.21	Jacory Patterson	45.60	Elija Godwin	46.09
800 meters	Josh Hoey	1:43.24 NR	Brandon Miller	1:44.26	Wes Ferguson	1:44.92
1500 meters	Hobbs Kessler	3:38.82	Sam Prakel	3:39.14	Luke Houser	3:39.27
3000 meters	Hobbs Kessler	7:38.00	Dylan Jacobs	7:38.02	Sam Gilman	7:38.64
3000 meter race walk	Emmanuel Corvera	11:57.89	Jordan Crawford	12:00.92	Jason Cherng	12:19.50

=== Men's field ===
Event	Gold		Silver		Bronze	
High jump	Vernon Turner	2.25 m (7 ft 4 1/2 in)	Elijah Kosiba	2.22 m (7 ft 3 1/4 in)	Earnest Sears	2.17 m (7 ft 1 1/4 in)
Pole vault	Chris Nilsen	5.70 m (18 ft 8 1/4 in)	Jacob Wooten	5.70 m (18 ft 8 1/4 in)	Austin Miller	5.70 m (18 ft 8 1/4 in)
Long jump	Will Williams	8.16 m (26 ft 9 1/4 in)	Cameron Crump	8.04 m (26 ft 4 1/2 in)	Marquis Dendy	8.01 m (26 ft 3 1/4 in)
Triple jump	James Carter	16.88 m (55 ft 4 1/2 in)	Russell Robinson	16.67 m (54 ft 8 1/4 in)	Donald Scott	16.62 m (54 ft 6 1/4 in)
Shot put	Tripp Piperi	21.50 m (70 ft 6 1/4 in)	Roger Steen	21.28 m (69 ft 9 3/4 in)	Josh Awotunde	21.05 m (69 ft 1/2 in)
Weight throw	Daniel Haugh	25.11 m (82 ft 4 1/2 in)	Tanner Berg	24.96 m (81 ft 10 1/2 in)	Alex Young	24.82 m (81 ft 5 in)
Heptathlon	Kyle Garland	6139 points	Hakim McMorris	6011 points	Aiden Ouimet	6006 points

=== Women's track ===
Event	Gold		Silver		Bronze	
60 meters	Celera Barnes	7.11 (7.104)	Jacious Sears	7.11 (7.107)	Mikiah Brisco	7.18
60 meter hurdles	Masai Russell	7.74	Grace Stark	7.76	Christina Clemons	7.81
400 meters	Alexis Holmes	50.51	Rosey Effiong	51.43	Quanera Hayes	51.47
800 meters	Nia Akins	1:59.31	Valery Tobias	1:59.55	Sage Hurta-Klecker	2:00.13
1500 meters	Nikki Hiltz	4:05.76	Sinclaire Johnson	4:06.05	Heather MacLean	4:06.69
3000 meters	Nikki Hiltz	8:48.28	Shelby Houlihan	8:48.43	Whittni Morgan	8:48.56
3000 meter race walk	Lauren Harris	13:23.83	Maria Michta-Coffey	13:33.28	Miranda Melville	13:36.67

=== Women's field ===
Event	Gold		Silver		Bronze	
High jump	Vashti Cunningham	1.94 m (6 ft 4 1/4 in)	Charity Hufnagel	1.94 m (6 ft 4 1/4 in)	Jenna Rogers	1.91 m (6 ft 3 in)
Pole vault	Katie Moon	4.80 m (15 ft 8 3/4 in)	Gabriela Leon	4.65 m (15 ft 3 in)	Emily Grove	4.65 m (15 ft 3 in)
Long jump	Monae' Nichols	6.73 m (22 ft 3/4 in)	Claire Bryant	6.72 m (22 ft 1/2 in)	Jasmine Moore	6.66 m (21 ft 10 in)
Triple jump	Jasmine Moore	13.90 m (45 ft 7 in)	Mylana Hearn	13.60 m (44 ft 7 1/4 in)	Makenzy Mizera	12.58 m (41 ft 3 1/4 in)
Shot put	Chase Jackson	19.65 m (64 ft 5 1/2 in)	Maggie Ewen	18.86 m (61 ft 10 1/2 in)	Jessica Ramsey	18.51 m (60 ft 8 1/2 in)
Weight throw	Rachel Richeson	25.26 m (82 ft 10 1/4 in)	Erin Reese	24.91 m (81 ft 8 1/2 in)	Jalani Davis	24.80 m (81 ft 4 1/4 in)
Pentathlon	Timara Chapman	4555 points	Cheyenne Nesbitt	4462 points	Erin Marsh	4423 points

Event schedule
DAY ONE—SATURDAY, February 22ND
Track Events
Time (EST)	Men / Women	Event	Division Round
11:00 AM	M	Heptathlon (60m)	
11:20 AM	W	Pentathlon (60m Hurdles)	
1:45 PM	M	3000m RW	Final
2:07 PM	W	3000m RW	Final
2:31 PM	W	800m	First Round
3:00 PM	M	800m	First Round
3:31 PM	W	3000m	Final
4:02 PM	W	60m Hurdles	Semi-Final
4:25 PM	M	60m Hurdles	Semi-Final
4:48 PM	W	Pentathlon (800m)	
5:03 PM	W	400m	First Round
5:39 PM	M	400m	First Round
6:15 PM	M	3000m	Final
6:30 PM	W	60m Hurdles	Final
6:38 PM	M	60m Hurdles	Final
Field Events
11:40 AM	M	Heptathlon (Long Jump)	
12:30 PM	W	Pentathlon (High Jump)	
12:45 PM	M	Heptathlon (Shot Put)	
1:00 PM	W	Pole Vault	Final
2:00 PM	W	Pentathlon (Shot Put)	
2:00 PM	M	Heptathlon (High Jump)	
3:10 PM	W	Shot Put	Final
3:15 PM	W	Heptathlon (Long Jump)	
3:15 PM	M	Triple Jump	Final
4:00 PM	M	Pole Vault	Final
4:30 PM	W	Long Jump	Final
5:00 PM	M	Weight Throw	Final
DAY TWO—SUNDAY, February 23RD
Track Events
10:00 AM	M	Heptathlon (60m Hurdles)	
12:56 PM	W	60m	Semi-Final
1:19 PM	M	60m	Semi-Final
1:44 PM	M	Heptathlon (1000m)	
1:52 PM	W	400m	Final
1:59 PM	W	800m	Final
2:07 PM	M	800m	Final
2:15 PM	M	400m	Final
2:23 PM	W	1500m	Final
2:32 PM	M	1500m	Final
2:45 PM	W	60m	Final
2:54 PM	M	60m	Final
Field Events
11:00 AM	M	High Jump	Final
11:00 AM	W	High Jump	Final
11:00 AM	M	Heptathlon (Pole Vault)	
11:00 AM	W	Weight Throw	Final
1:15 PM	W	Triple Jump	Final
1:36 PM	M	Long Jump	Final
1:45 PM	M	Shot Put	Final
