= Valery Tobias =

American runner (born 2000)

Personal information
- Born: 24 September 2000 (age 25)

Sport
- Sport: Athletics
- Event: Middle-distance running
- Coached by: PattiSue Plumer

Achievements and titles
- Personal bests: 800m: 1:59.40 (Eugene, 2025); 1500m: 4:15.29 (Portland, 2025)

Valery Tobias (born 24 September 2000) is an American middle-distance runner. She was runner-up over 800 metres at the 2025 and 2026 USA Indoor Championships.

== Early life ==
From Lower Rio Grande Valley in Texas, she attended Edinburg IDEA Quest.

== Career ==
Running for the University of Texas, she was one of a quartet, along with Julien Alfred, Rhasidat Adeleke, and Kennedy Simon that broke the collegiate record in the sprint medley, running 3:36.10 in April 2023 at the Texas Relays. She set new college records for the 800 metres, both indoors and outdoors. Tobias joined the Brooks Beasts Track Club in 2024.

She was runner-up to Nia Akins at the 2025 USA Indoor Track and Field Championships, running a 1:59.55 seconds personal best for the 800 metres. She was selected for the 2025 World Athletics Indoor Championships in Nanjing in March 2025, where she placed fifth in her semi-final.

In May 2025, she set a new personal best for the 800 metres, running 1:59.49 in Los Angeles. She was a finalist in the 800 metres at the 2025 USA Outdoor Track and Field Championships, running 1:59.40 in the semi-final before placing eighth overall in the final.

On 1 March 2026, she was second to Addison Wiley in the 800 metres at the 2026 USA Indoor Track and Field Championships, running 1:59.77, for a second consecutive runner-up place at the championships. She was selected to represent the United States at the 2026 World Athletics Indoor Championships in Toruń, Poland, and although she qualified for the semi-finals was later disqualified for a lane infringement.

=== International competitions ===
Representing the United States
Year	Competition	Venue	Position	Event	Time
2025	World Athletics Indoor Championships	Nanjing, China	8th	800m	2:03.39
2026	World Athletics Indoor Championships	Toruń, Poland	--	800m	DQ

=== National championships ===
Year	Competition	Venue	Position	Event	Time
2023	USATF Outdoor Championships	Eugene, Oregon	21st	800m	2:03.58
2024	Olympic Trials	Eugene, Oregon	24th	800m	2:04.33
2025	USATF Indoor Championships	Staten Island, New York	2nd	800m	1:59.55
2025	USATF Outdoor Championships	Eugene, Oregon	8th	800m	2:02.11
2026	USATF Indoor Championships	Staten Island, New York	2nd	800m	1:59.77
2026	USATF Outdoor Championships	New York City, New York	12th	800m	2:01.98
