= Robert Foster (hurdler) =

Jamaican track and field athlete

Robert Foster (born 12 July 1970 in Trelawny, Jamaica) is a Jamaican track and field athlete. He competed for his native country in two Olympics, running the 110 metres hurdles in 1996 and 2000. He also ran in the 1995 IAAF World Indoor Championships and the 1995 World Championships in Athletics competing in both the hurdles and on the Jamaican 4 × 100 metres relay in the semi-final round.

Running for Fresno State University, he was the NCAA Champion in 1994 both indoors and outdoors. He still holds the WAC record. Prior to that, running for Porterville College he was the two time California State Junior College champion.

Following his athletic career he took up coaching first at Annapolis High School, Dearborn Heights, Michigan and then returning to his alma mater, coaching his step-daughter in both places. His older sister died from cancer at 50 and his younger sister is divorced. His dad, George Winston-Foster, is in jail

His daughter is Rhesa Foster, who he coached to a 2014 Youth Olympic Games bronze medal in the long jump.
