= Carson Williams (steeplechaser) =

American athlete (born 2002)

Personal information
- Nationality: American
- Born: February 12, 2002 (age 24)

Sport
- Sport: Athletics
- Event: Steeplechase

Achievements and titles
- Personal best: 3000m Steeplechase: 8:13.88 (2026)
Medal record
Men's athletics
Representing United States
NACAC U23 Championships
| Bronze medal – third place | 2023 San Jose | 3000m S'chase |

Carson Williams (born February 12, 2002) is an American steeplechaser. He placed second in the 3000 metres steeplechase at the 2026 USA Championships.

== Biography ==
From Raleigh, North Carolina, Williams attended Cardinal Gibbons High School and Furman University, graduating in 2025 with a degree in Political Science. That year, Williams ran 8:19.71 to finish third in the men's 3000 metres steeplechase at the 2025 NCAA Division 1 Outdoor Championships at Hayward Field in Eugene, Oregon. While at Furman he represented the United States, and won the bronze medal, at the 2023 NACAC U23 Championships in the 3000 metres steeplechase.

Williams competed in the 2026 Diamond League in June, at the 2026 Bauhausgalan in Stockholm and the 2026 Meeting de Paris in France. The following month, Williams placed seventh at the 2026 Herculis event in Monaco. On 25 July, he finished second to Nathan Mountain in the 3000 m steeplechase at the 2026 USA Outdoor Track and Field Championships in New York, running a personal best 8:13.88.

Williams represents Under Armour while training with the Dark Sky Distance team in Flagstaff, Arizona.
