= Meghan Hunter =

American middle-distance runner (born 2001)

Personal information
- Born: 31 May 2001 (age 25)

Sport
- Sport: Athletics
- Event: Middle-distance running

Achievements and titles
- Personal bests: 800m: 1:58.21 (Los Angeles, 2025); Indoor; 800m: 1:59.70 (New York, 2026)

Meghan Hunter (born 31 May 2001) is an American middle-distance runner. She was third over 800 metres at both the 2026 USA Indoor Championships and 2026 USA Outdoor Championships.

== Early life ==
From Provo, Utah, her father Iain moved from England to California in childhood, and also ran in college and later became an Exercise Science professor, focusing on the biomechanics of runners and from 2003, a consultant with USATF. She has siblings Kate, John and Morgan and attended Provo High School. She won individual state championships in the 100 metres, 200 metres, 400 metres and 800 metres, and set an all-classes state record in the 400 metres of 52.59 seconds. Despite suffering a cruciate knee ligament injury she was named Gatorade’s Athlete of the Year in 2018 and 2019. She signed a letter of intent with Brigham Young University in 2019. She graduated in 2023 with a bachelor's degree in communications disorders and began a master's degree in speech and language pathology.

== Career ==
Diljeet Taylor, the BYU track and cross-country coach, chose for Hunter to concentrate on 800 metres running. In May 2021 she ran 2:04.27 for the distance, and in the winter of 2022 she won the Mountain States Federation championship in a time of 2:04.08 which was the sixth fastest indoor time ever at BYU.

She placed third at the 2024 NCAA Indoor Championships in March 2024. She was a semi-finalist at the U.S. Olympic Trials in June 2024.

In January 2025, Hunter won the 800m at the John Thomas Terrier Classic in Boston, Massachusetts with a time of 2:00.21 to set a new BYU school indoor record. In February 2025, Hunter ram alongside Carmen Alder, Riley Chamberlain, and Tessa Buswell to set a new collegiate best time of 10:37.58 for the distance relay medley at the Husky Classic, breaking the previous best NCAA mark by over six seconds.

She finished in third place in the 800 metres at the 2025 NCAA Outdoor Championships in Eugene, Oregon, in a time of 1:59.03. She lowered her personal best to 1:58.21 to win the 800 metres at the Sunset Tour Los Angeles on 12 July 2025 ahead of Maggi Congdon. The time placed her sixth on the all-dates NCAA list. She reached the final of the 800 metres at the 2025 USA Outdoor Track and Field Championships, running 1:58.42 in the semi-final. In the final, she placed fifth overall in 2:00.53 after a tangle of legs in the final 200 metres with Addy Wiley. She finished fifth in the final of the 800 metres competing for the United States at the 2025 NACAC Championships in Freeport, The Bahamas.

Hunter turned professional and joined fellow BYU alumni Lexy Halladay-Lowry the Nike Swoosh team based in Provo. On 24 January 2026, Hunter earned a win in the women's 800 meters at the Dr. Sander Scorcher in New York, running 1:59.70 despite an injury restricted end to 2025. The following month, she ran won the 800 metres in 1:59.74, leading gun to tape, at the BU Valentine Invitational in Boston.

On 1 March 2026, she was third to Addison Wiley and Valery Tobias in the 800 metres at the 2026 USA Indoor Track and Field Championships, running 2:00.03. On 11 July, Hunter ran 1:58.43 at the Sound Running Sunset Tour. She placed third in the final of the 800 metres at the 2026 USA Championships in New York on 26 July, running 1:59.67.

== Personal life ==
In July 2019, she was injured in an automobile accident after a deer jumped in front of the car she was travelling in on her way to volunteer at a local race meet. It resulted in a broken neck, with doctors initially fearing if she would run again with vertebrae fused together in surgery and months in a neck brace. She returned to track work outs nine months after the incident. After her return to racing, she was nominated for a CWSA Honda Inspiration Award and the 2024 NCAA Woman of the Year Award. In 2025, she was selected by the Big 12 Conference of directors for the annual Bob Bowlsby Award. She is a member of The Church of Jesus Christ of Latter-day Saints.
