= Rhesa Foster =

American long jumper (born 1998)

Personal information
- Nationality: USA
- Born: 25 May 1998 (28 years, 69 days old) Pomona, California
- Home town: Clovis, California
- Education: Clovis North High School; University of Oregon
- Parent: Robert Foster (father)

Sport
- Sport: Athletics
- Events: Long jump 60 metres hurdles
- College team: Oregon Ducks
- Club: Nike, Inc.
- Coached by: Robert Foster

Achievements and titles
- National finals: 2016 USA U20s; • Long jump, NM; 2017 NCAAs; • Long jump, 20th; 2017 USA U20s; • Long jump, 2nd (silver); 2018 NCAAs; • Long jump, 12th; 2019 NCAA Indoors; • Long jump, 5th; 2019 NCAAs; • Long jump, 7th; 2021 NCAAs; • Long jump, 15th; 2022 USA Indoors; • Long jump, 4th; 2022 USA Champs; • Long jump, 11th; 2023 USA Indoors; • Long jump, 1st (gold); 2023 USA Champs; • Long jump, 9th
- Personal bests: LJ: 6.74m (+2.0) (2023); 60mH: 8.34 (2020)
Medal record
Women's athletics
Representing United States
Summer Youth Olympics
Bronze medal – third place	2014 Nanjing	Long jump
- Updated on January 1, 2024

Rhesa Foster (born May 25, 1998) is an American long jumper. She won the bronze medal at the 2014 Summer Youth Olympics in the long jump, and she won the 2023 USA Outdoor Track and Field Championships after the drugs disqualification of original winner Tara Davis.

== Biography ==
Foster is from Clovis, California where she attended Clovis North High School. Her father is Robert Foster, who competed at the 1996 and 2000 Summer Olympics in the 110 metres hurdles. Her brother Caleb was also a fourth-place finisher at the 2018 CIF state championships.

In 2014, she won the bronze medal in the long jump at the Summer Youth Olympics. She was the first American to medal in athletics at the 2014 Summer Youth Olympics, and to do it she set a personal best of 6.17 metres.

As a senior in 2016, Foster had reconstructive surgery on her knee due an ACL tear sustained during volleyball her junior year, followed by a hamstring injury that hampered her final high school season. She nonetheless was the winner of the California Interscholastic Federation state championships long jump, breaking a 45-year-old section record.

From 2017 to 2021, Foster attended The University of Oregon, competing on the Oregon Ducks track and field team. She qualified for NCAA Division I Women's Outdoor Track and Field Championships finals in 2017, 2018, 2019, and 2021, and she also qualified for the indoor championship finals in 2019, which she achieved her best finish of 5th place at.

On June 23, 2017, Foster qualified for the 2017 Pan American U20 Athletics Championships by virtue of her second-place finish at the USATF U20 Outdoor Championships. She finished 4th in the finals, just missing out on the medals.

Competing in her first national championships as a professional, Foster finished 4th at the 2022 USA Indoor Track and Field Championships in the long jump. After finishing 11th at the outdoor championships, Foster improved to win the silver medal at the 2023 USA Indoor Track and Field Championships—a result that later got promoted to gold after original winner Tara Davis tested positive for cannabis.

== Statistics ==
=== Personal bests ===
Event	Mark	Place	Competition	Venue	Date	Ref
Long jump	6.74 m (22 ft 1 1/4 in) (+2.0 m/s)	1st place, gold medalist(s)	Azusa Pacific University Franson Last Chance	Azusa, California	May 12, 2023	
60 metres hurdles	8.34	(silver) (heat #2)	Mountain Pacific Sports Federation Indoor Championships	Seattle, Washington	February 28, 2020	
