= 2025 World Athletics Indoor Championships – Women's 800 metres =

Women's 800 metres at the 2025 World Athletics Indoor Championships
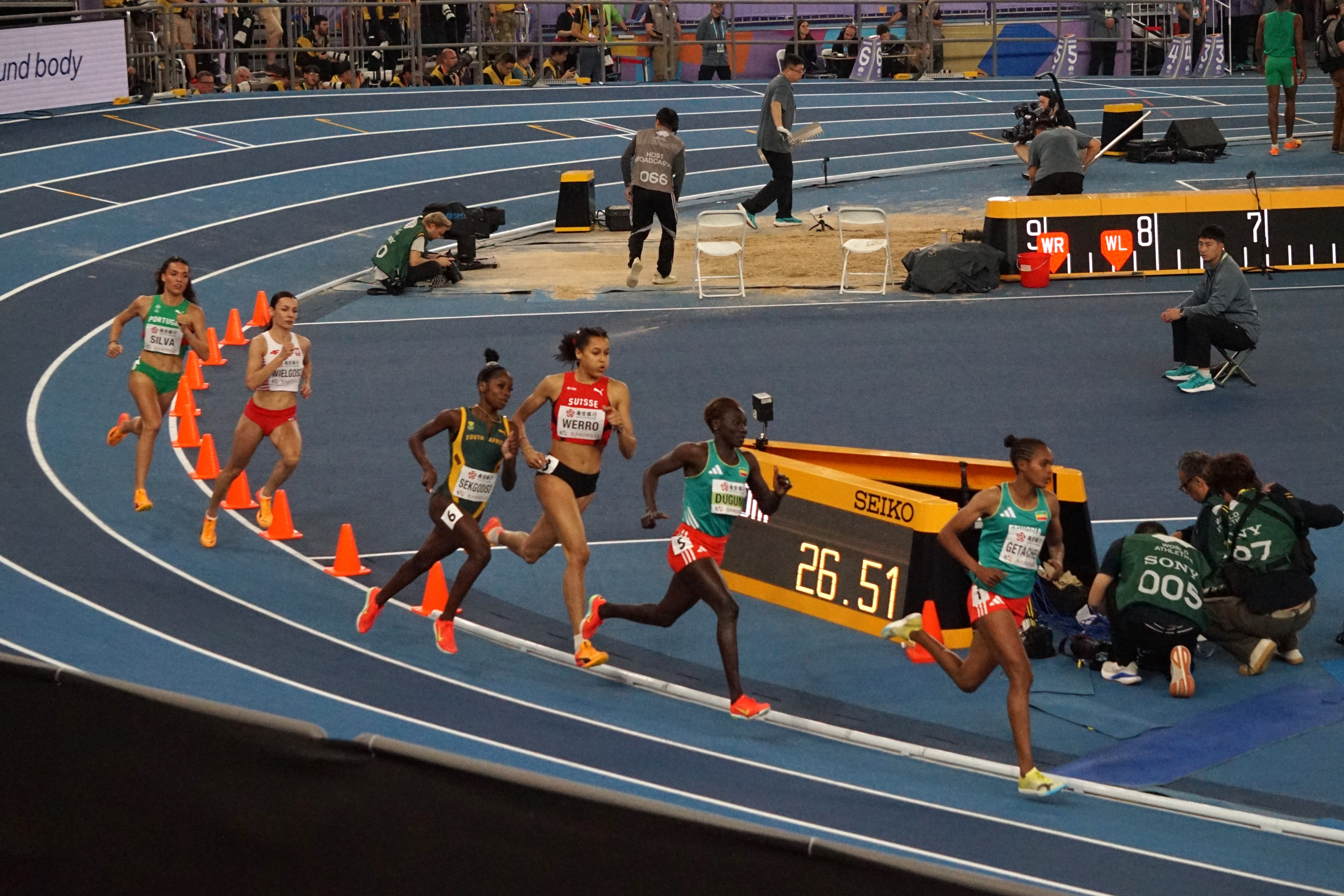
- The final underway
- Venue: Nanjing's Cube at Nanjing Youth Olympic Sports Park
- Location: Nanjing, China
- Dates: 21 March (heats); 22 March (semi-finals); 23 March (final)
- Winning time: 1:58.40 WL

Medalists
gold medal	Prudence Sekgodiso	South Africa
silver medal	Nigist Getachew	Ethiopia
bronze medal	Patricia Silva	Portugal

The women's 800 metres at the 2025 World Athletics Indoor Championships took place in the Nanjing's Cube at Nanjing Youth Olympic Sports Park in Nanjing, China, on 21, 22 and 23 March 2025. It was the 21st time the event was contested at the World Athletics Indoor Championships. Athletes qualified by achieving the entry standard or by their World Athletics Ranking in the event.

The heats took place on 21 March during the morning session. The semi-finals occurred on 22 March during the evening session. The final took place on 23 March during the evening session.

== Background ==
The women's 800 metres was contested 20 times before 2025, at every previous edition of the World Athletics Indoor Championships.

Records before the 2025 World Athletics Indoor Championships
Record	Athlete (nation)	Time (s)	Location	Date
World record	Jolanda Čeplak (SLO)	1:55.82	Vienna, Austria	3 March 2002
Championship record	Ludmila Formanová (CZE)	1:56.90	Maebashi, Japan	7 March 1999
World leading	Tsige Duguma (ETH)	1:58.97	Metz, France	8 February 2025

== Qualification ==
For the women's 800 metres, the qualification period ran from 1 September 2024 until 9 March 2025. Athletes qualified by achieving the entry standards of 2:00.00. Athletes were also able to qualify by virtue of their World Athletics Ranking for the event, or by virtue of their World Athletics Indoor Tour wildcard. There was a target number of 30 athletes.

== Results ==
=== Heats ===
The heats took place on 21 March, starting at 11:15 (UTC+8) in the morning. The first 3 of each heat (Q) qualified for the semi-finals.

==== Heat 1 ====
Place	Athlete	Nation	Time	Notes
1	Patricia Silva	Portugal	2:04.44	Q
2	Lilian Odira	Kenya	2:04.46	Q
3	Habitam Alemu	Ethiopia	2:04.48	Q
4	Eloisa Coiro	Italy	2:04.50	
5	Halimah Nakaayi	Uganda	2:04.57	SB
6	Wilma Nielsen	Sweden	2:04.97	

==== Heat 2 ====
Place	Athlete	Nation	Time	Notes
1	Tsige Duguma	Ethiopia	2:04.52	Q
2	Audrey Werro	Switzerland	2:04.91	Q
3	Lorea Ibarzabal	Spain	2:05.10	Q
4	Vivian Chebet Kiprotich	Kenya	2:05.11	SB
5	Aurora Rynda	Canada	2:07.17	
6	Wu Hongjiao	China	2:08.77	

==== Heat 3 ====
Place	Athlete	Nation	Time	Notes
1	Prudence Sekgodiso	South Africa	2:03.89	Q
2	Nigist Getachew	Ethiopia	2:03.91	Q, PB
3	Valery Tobias	United States	2:04.42	Q
4	Abbey Caldwell	Australia	2:05.15	PB
5	Alison Andrews-Paul	New Zealand	2:05.76	
6	Noélie Yarigo	Benin	2:07.88	

==== Heat 4 ====
Place	Athlete	Nation	Time	Notes
1	Nia Akins	United States	2:03.29	Q
2	Anna Wielgosz	Poland	2:03.40	Q
3	Shafiqua Maloney	Saint Vincent and the Grenadines	2:03.56	Q
4	Sarah Billings	Australia	2:03.60	PB
5	Caroline Bredlinger	Austria	2:03.78	
6	Rachel Pellaud	Switzerland	2:06.24	

=== Semi-finals ===
The semi-finals took place on 22 March, starting at 12:05 (UTC+8) in the afternoon. The first 3 of each heat (Q) qualified for the final.

==== Heat 1 ====
Place	Athlete	Nation	Time	Notes
1	Tsige Duguma	Ethiopia	2:03.85	Q
2	Nigist Getachew	Ethiopia	2:04.01	Q
3	Patricia Silva	Portugal	2:04.20	Q
4	Nia Akins	United States	2:04.38	
5	Shafiqua Maloney	Saint Vincent and the Grenadines	2:04.55	
6	Lilian Odira	Kenya	2:16.12	

==== Heat 2 ====
Place	Athlete	Nation	Time	Notes
1	Audrey Werro	Switzerland	2:01.11	Q
2	Prudence Sekgodiso	South Africa	2:01.21	Q
3	Anna Wielgosz	Poland	2:01.36	Q
4	Lorea Ibarzabal	Spain	2:02.57	
5	Valery Tobias	United States	2:03.39	
6	Habitam Alemu	Ethiopia	2:05.44	

=== Final ===
The final took place on 23 March, starting at 20:54 (UTC+8).

Place	Athlete	Nation	Time	Notes
1st place, gold medalist(s)	Prudence Sekgodiso	South Africa	1:58.40	WL, NR
2nd place, silver medalist(s)	Nigist Getachew	Ethiopia	1:59.63	PB
3rd place, bronze medalist(s)	Patricia Silva	Portugal	1:59.80	NR
4	Audrey Werro	Switzerland	1:59.81	NR
5	Anna Wielgosz	Poland	2:00.34	PB
6	Tsige Duguma	Ethiopia	2:04.76	
