= Nathan Mountain =

American athlete (born 2002)

Personal information
- Nationality: American
- Born: August 27, 2002 (age 23)

Sport
- Sport: Athletics
- Event: Steeplechase

Achievements and titles
- Personal best: 3000m Steeplechase: 8:11.92 (2026)

Nathan Mountain (born 27 August 2002) is an American steeplechaser. He won the 3000 metres steeplechase at the 2026 USA Outdoor Track and Field Championships.

== Biography ==
A high school student of St. Xavier High School, Ohio, Mountain initially competed in football before switching his focus to athletics in his freshman year, and set a new school record in the cross country running over 5km at the Trinity / Valkyrie Invitational in Louisville in September 2020. He set a national high school record in the 2000 metres steeplechase of 5:40.72 in June 2021, a record that stood for five years. The following month, he won over two-miles at the Brooks PR Invitational. Following his high school career he joined the University of Virginia.

Mountain placed second to Parker Stokes in the 3000 metres steeplechase at the 2024 NCAA Championships. In April 2026, Mountain ran 8:11.92 in the 3000 metres steeplechase at the Virginia Challenge. He had a ninth place finish at the 2026 NCAA Championships in June. The following month, he won the 2026 USA Outdoor Track and Field Championships in 8:13.81 in New York, winning ahead of Carson Williams, despite almost falling at the final barrier. That year, he signed a professional contract with Hoka to join a professional set-up in Portland.
