= Wes Ferguson =

American middle-distance runner (born 2001)

Personal information
- Born: 5 March 2001 (age 25)

Sport
- Sport: Athletics
- Event: Middle-distance running

Achievements and titles
- Personal bests: 800m: 1:44.41 (2026); Indoor; 800m: 1:44.92 (2025)

Wes Ferguson (born 5 March 2001) is an American middle-distance runner. He finished runner-up over 800 metres at the 2026 USA Championships, having previously placed third at the 2025 USA Indoor Championships.

== Biography ==
From Fremont, Nebraska, he attended Fremont High School and was initially a keen golfer before focusing on track and field.

Ferguson attended the University of Nebraska at Kearney. In January 2022, he broke the NCAA Division II record for the 1000 metres, running a time of 2:23.8 at the Nebraska Graduate Classic in Lincoln, Nebraska. He won the NCAA Division II 800 metres title both indoors and outdoors in 2022, before moving into the top three on the DII all-time list with a win outdoors in 2023. He won his third consecutive 800 metres outdoor title on 25 May 2024, and also won all-American honours that year as part of the men's 4x400 m relay team. He finished his time at the university with eight school-records across disciplines indoors and outdoors. The following month, he was a semi-finalist in the 800 metres at the USA Olympic Trials, having entered the trials with eighth best time in the country of 1:45.06.

After graduating from University with a Bachelor of Science in Sports Management, Ferguson signed a professional contract with Under Armour. In February 2025, he placed third over 800 metres at the 2025 USA Indoor Track and Field Championships in New York, running 1:44.92 in the final to finish behind Josh Hoey and Brandon Miller.

On 30 May 2026, he ran a personal best time of 1:44.41 to win the 800 metres at the Under Armour Track and Field Nationals competition in Bradenton, Florida. Ferguson was the fastest qualifier with 1:45.17 for the final of the 800 metres at the 2026 USA Championships in New York on 26 July, ultimately finishing runner-up in the final to Cooper Lutkenhaus in 1:44.55 ahead of Hobbs Kessler.
