= Demarius Smith =

American sprinter (born 1998)

Personal information
- Full name: Demarius J Smith
- Born: 25 December 1998 (age 27) New Orleans, Louisiana

Sport
- Country: United States
- Sport: Athletics
- Event: Sprint

Achievements and titles
- World finals: Indoor World Champion 2026 Pan American Silver Medalist 2023
- Personal bests: 60 m: 6.64 s (Lubbock, 2023); 100 m: 10.07 s (Austin, 2023); 200 m: 20.25 s (Gainesville, 2025); 400 m: 44.45 s (Eugene, 2025)
Medal record
Men's athletics
Representing United States
World Championships
Silver medal – second place	2025 Tokyo	4 × 400 m relay
World Indoor Championships
Gold medal – first place	2026 Toruń	4 × 400 m relay
Pan American Games
Silver medal – second place	2023 Santiago	4 × 400 m relay mixed

Demarius Smith (born 25 December 1998) is an American sprinter. He won silver medals in the men's 4 × 400 metres relay at the 2025 World Athletics Championships, and in the mixed 4 × 400 metres relay at the 2023 Pan American Games.

== Early life ==
He attended Parkview High School in Gwinnett County, Georgia.

== Career ==
He was a silver medalist at the 2023 Pan American Games in Santiago de Chile in the Mixed 4 × 400 metres relay, with the team initially finishing third, but race winners Dominican Republic were later disqualified.

He was named in the United States squad for the 2024 World Athletics Relays in The Bahamas. In June 2024, he was a semi-finalist in the 400 metres at the US Olympic Trials in Eugene, Oregon.

He ran a personal best 45.19 seconds for the 400 metres competing in Marseille, France on 13 July 2025 to finish ahead of Randolph Ross. That month, he also competed in Europe over 200 metres. He lowered his personal best for the 400 metres again on 1 August 2025, running 44.45 seconds to reach the final of the 400 metres at the 2025 USA Indoor Track and Field Championships in Eugene, Oregon, before placing seventh in the final in 45.55 seconds.

He was selected for the American team for the 2025 World Athletics Championships in Tokyo, Japan, as part of the relay pool. He competed in the men's 4 × 400 metres, where his handover to teammate Bryce Deadmon was ruled as impacted by an infraction by a Zambian athlete in the adjoining lane. Despite the American team placing sixth in the race; the American team and Kenyan team, who were also deemed to have been affected by Zambia during the heat, were put into a run-off against each other for a place in the final; with the same quartet, running in the same lanes. Smith ran as they won the run-off on the morning of the final, with a time of 2:58.48, before a different quartet ran the final later that day, placing second behind Botswana.

Smith was finalist in the 400 metres at the 2026 USA Indoor Track and Field Championships in New York, running 45.89 seconds. He was selected for the United States relay teams at the 2026 World Athletics Indoor Championships in Toruń, Poland, and ran in the men's 4 × 400 metres relay, with the team winning the gold medal. On 25 July, Smith placed third in the 400 metres at the 2026 USA Outdoor Track and Field Championships in New York, with a season's best time of 44.54 seconds.
