= Athletics at the 2023 Pan American Games – Mixed 4 × 400 metres relay =

Mixed 4 × 400 metres relay at the 2023 Pan American Games
- Venue: Julio Martínez National Stadium
- Dates: October 30
- Competitors: 28 from 7 nations
- Winning time: 3:16.05

Medalists
Gold medal	Ezequiel Suárez; Anabel Medina; Robert King; Marileidy Paulino	Dominican Republic
Silver medal	Douglas Mendes; Letícia Nonato; Lucas Vilar; Tiffani Marinho	Brazil
Bronze medal	Demarius Smith; Honour Finley; Richard Kuykendoll; Jada Griffin	United States

The mixed 4 × 400 metres relay competition of the athletics events at the 2023 Pan American Games took place on October 30 at the Julio Martínez National Stadium of Santiago, Chile.

== Records ==
Prior to this competition, the existing world and Pan American Games records were as follows:

World record	United States	3:08.80	Budapest, Hungary	August 19, 2023
Pan American Games record	Inaugural event	—	—	—

== Schedule ==
Date	Time	Round
October 30, 2023	21:15	Final

== Results ==
All times shown are in seconds.

KEY:	q	Fastest non-qualifiers	Q	Qualified	NR	National record	PB	Personal best	SB	Seasonal best	DQ	Disqualified

=== Final ===
The results were as follows

Rank	Lane	Nation	Name	Time	Notes
1st place, gold medalist(s)	7	Dominican Republic	Ezequiel Suárez; Anabel Medina; Robert King; Marileidy Paulino	3:16.05	
2nd place, silver medalist(s)	8	Brazil	Douglas Mendes; Letícia Nonato; Lucas Vilar; Tiffani Marinho	3:18.55	
3rd place, bronze medalist(s)	3	United States	Demarius Smith; Honour Finley; Richard Kuykendoll; Jada Griffin	3:19.41	
4	5	Cuba	Yoao Illas; Lisneidy Veitía; Yoandys Lescay; Zurian Hechavarría	3:21.20	
5	6	Ecuador	Francisco Tejeda; Virginia Villalba; Alan Minda; Nicole Caicedo	3:23.09	
6	2	Colombia	Jhon Perlaza; Lina Licona; Anthony Zambrano; Evelis Aguilar	3:23.17	
7	4	Chile	Martín Zabala; Poulette Cardoch; Sergio Germain; Stephanie Saavedra	3:28.77	
