= 2023 USA Indoor Track and Field Championships =

2023 USA Track & Field Indoor Championships
- Dates: February 16–18
- Host city: Albuquerque, New Mexico, United States
- Venue: Albuquerque Convention Center
- Level: Senior
- Type: Indoor
- Events: 28 (men: 14; women: 14)
- Participation: 212 Men + 212 Women; 424 athletes

The 2023 USA Indoor Track and Field Championships were held at Albuquerque Convention Center in Albuquerque, New Mexico. Organized by USA Track and Field (USATF), the three-day competition took place from February 16 to February 18 and served as the national championships in track and field for the United States.

== Medal summary ==
=== Men's track ===
Event	Gold		Silver		Bronze	
60 metres	J.T. Smith	6.53	Kendal Williams	6.59 SB	Isaiah Trousil	6.61
60 m hurdles	Freddie Crittenden	7.49	Robert Dunning	7.49	Louis Rollins	7.63
400 metres	Justin Robinson	45.40	Noah Williams	45.69	Craig Allen	46.11
800 metres	Bryce Hoppel	1:45.92	Isaiah Harris	1:46.42	Vincent Crisp	1:46.74
1500 metres	Sam Prakel	3:42.62	Henry Wynne	3:42.90	John Reniewicki	3:44.09
3000 metres	Sam Prakel	8:12.46	Eduardo Herrera	8:13.11	Olin Hacker	8:14.33
3000 metres race walk	Nick Christie	11:56.67	Daniel Nehnevaj	12:19.23	Emmanuel Corvera	12:50.49

=== Men's field ===
Event	Gold		Silver		Bronze	
High jump	Shelby McEwen	2.24 m (7 ft 4 in)	Darius Carbin	2.21 m (7 ft 3 in)	Jordan Wesner	2.21 m (7 ft 3 in)
Pole vault	Sam Kendricks	5.91 m (19 ft 4 1/2 in)	Jacob Wooten	5.86 m (19 ft 2 1/2 in)	KC Lightfoot	5.86 m (19 ft 2 1/2 in)
Long jump	William Williams Jr.	8.20 m (26 ft 10 3/4 in) PB	Jalen Seals	7.69 m (25 ft 2 3/4 in) SB	Rayvon Grey	7.66 m (25 ft 1 1/2 in)
Triple jump	Donald Scott	16.96 m (55 ft 7 1/2 in)	Omar Craddock	16.38 m (53 ft 8 3/4 in)	R'Lazon Brumfield	16.14 m (52 ft 11 1/4 in)
Shot put	Joseph Kovacs	21.55 m (70 ft 8 1/4 in) SB	Jordan Geist	21.36 m (70 ft 3/4 in)	Adrian Piperi III	21.05 m (69 ft 1/2 in) SB
Weight Throw	Daniel Haugh	25.44 m (83 ft 5 1/2 in)	Alex Young	24.25 m (79 ft 6 1/2 in)	Rudy Winkler	23.88 m (78 ft 4 in)
Heptathlon	Steve Bastien	6012 points	Will Daniels	5946 points	Devon Williams	5898 points

=== Women's track ===
Event	Gold		Silver		Bronze	
60 metres	Aleia Hobbs	6.94 AR	Marybeth Sant Price	7.09	Destiny Smith-Barnett	7.11
60 m hurdles	Alaysha Johnson	7.83	Tonea Marshall	7.85	Amber Hughes	8.01
400 metres	Anna Hall	51.03	Na'asha Robinson	52.30	Brittany Aveni	52.67
800 metres	Nia Akins	2:00.16	Allie Wilson	2:00.33	Kaela Edwards	2:00.52
1500 metres	Nikki Hiltz	4:17.10	Sage Hurta-Klecker	4:17.26	Kristlin Gear	4:18.21
3000 metres	Valerie Constien	8:48.29	Whittni Morgan	8:48.42	Emily Mackay	8:50.14
3000 metres race walk	Miranda Melville	13:37.69	Maria Michta-Coffey	13.49.29	Janelle Branch	14:04.17

=== Women's field ===
Event	Gold		Silver		Bronze	
High jump	Vashti Cunningham	2.00 m (6 ft 6 1/2 in)	Nissi Kabongo	1.87 m (6 ft 1 1/2 in)	Mercedeez Francis	1.87 m (6 ft 1 1/2 in)
Pole vault	Katie Moon	4.80 m (15 ft 8 3/4 in)	Emily Grove	4.66 m (15 ft 3 1/4 in)	Bridget Williams	4.61 m (15 ft 1 1/4 in)
Long jump (Note: Tara Davis-Woodhall originally won the women's long jump with a mark of 6.99 m (22 ft 11 in), but she tested positive for cannabis at the event and was given a one-month ban from competition, nullifying her result and promoting Rhesa Foster to winner.)	Rhesa Foster	6.63 m (21 ft 9 in)	Tiffany Flynn	6.57 m (21 ft 6 1/2 in)	Quanesha Burks	6.46 m (21 ft 2 1/4 in)
Triple jump	Keturah Orji	14.31 m (46 ft 11 1/4 in)	Imani Oliver	13.13 m (43 ft 3/4 in)	Cierra Pulliam	12.99 m (42 ft 7 1/4 in)
Shot put	Chase Ealey	19.87 m (65 ft 2 1/4 in)	Magdalyn Ewen	19.41 m (63 ft 8 in)	Jessica Woodward	17.67 m (57 ft 11 1/2 in)
Weight Throw	DeAnna Price	26.02 m (85 ft 4 1/4 in) WB	Brooke Anderson	24.97 m (81 ft 11 in)	Rachel Tanczos	24.58 m (80 ft 7 1/2 in)
Pentathlon	Anna Hall	5004 points AR	Hope Bender	4445 points	Erin Marsh	4432 points

== Qualification ==
The 2023 USA Indoor Track and Field Championships serve as the national championship meet for United States. The 2023 World Athletics Indoor Championships were cancelled in the summer of 2022 due to COVID-19 restrictions in the host country, China.

=== Defending World Champions ===
- Grant Holloway - 60 m hurdles
- Ajeé Wilson - 800 m
- Sandi Morris - pole vault

=== Defending World Tour Winner ===
- Elijah Hall - 60 m

== Schedule ==
H	Heats	½	Semi-finals	F	Final
M = morning session, A = afternoon session

Men
Date →	17 February	18 February	
Event ↓	A	A	
60 metres		½	F
400 metres	H	F	
800 metres	H	F	
1500 metres		F	
3000 metres	F		
60 metres hurdles		½	F
High jump	F		
Pole vault	F		
Long jump		F	
Triple jump		F	
Shot put		F	
35 lbs Weight throw		F	

Women
Date →	17 February	18 February	
Event ↓	A	A	
60 metres		½	F
400 metres	H	F	
800 metres	H	F	
1500 metres	F		
3000 metres		F	
60 metres hurdles		½	F
High jump		F	
Pole vault		F	
Long jump	F		
Triple jump		F	
Shot put	F		
20 lbs Weight throw		F	

Event schedule
DAY ONE - - THURSDAY, February 16TH
Track Events
1:30 PM	M	3000m Race Walk	Final
2:00 PM	W	3000m Race Walk	Final
Indoor pentathlon
11:00 AM	W	Pentathlon (60m Hurdles)	Final
12:00 PM	W	Pentathlon (High Jump)	Final
2:30 PM	W	Pentathlon (Shot Put)	Final
3:45 PM	W	Pentathlon (Long Jump)	Final
5:00 PM; 5:08 PM	W	Pentathlon (800m) Group B Group A	Final
Indoor heptathlon
11:30 AM	M	Heptathlon (60m)	Final
12:15 PM	M	Heptathlon (Long Jump)	Final
1:30 PM	M	Heptathlon (Shot Put)	Final
2:30 PM	M	Heptathlon (High Jump)	Final
DAY TWO—FRIDAY, February 17TH
10:00 AM	M	Heptathlon (60m Hurdles)	Final
11:00 AM	M	Heptathlon (Pole Vault)	Final
1:55 PM	M	Heptathlon (1000m)	Final
DAY TWO—FRIDAY, February 17TH NBC Sports 2:00 - 4:30 PM MT
Track Events
Time (PST)	Men / Women	Event	Division Round
12:00 PM	W	60m Hurdles	First Round
12:26 PM	M	60m Hurdles	First Round
12:40 PM	W	60m	First Round
1:05 PM	M	60m	First Round
2:14 PM	W	3000m	Final
2:29 PM	W	800m	First Round
2:54 PM	M	800m	First Round
3:19 PM	M	400m	First Round
3:44 PM	W	400m	First Round
4:10 PM	M	3000m	Final
Field Events
12:30 PM	W	20LB Weight Throw	Final
1:40 PM	M	Triple Jump	Final
1:45 PM	W	Long Jump	Final
2:15 PM	W	High Jump	Final
2:40 PM	M	35LB Weight Throw	Final
DAY THREE—SATURDAY, February 18TH NBC Sports 2:00 - 4:00 PM MT
Track Events
1:00 PM	W	60m Hurdles	Semi Finals
1:14 PM	M	60m Hurdles	Semi Finals
1:30 PM	W	60m	Semi Finals
1:44 PM	M	60m	Semi Finals
2:04 PM; 2:12 PM	W	400m	Final
2:20 PM	W	800m	Final
2:28 PM	M	800m	Final
2:35 PM; 2:43 PM	M	400m	Final
3:00 PM	W	1500m	Final
3:10 PM	M	1500m	Final
3:20 PM	W	60m Hurdles	Final
3:30 PM	M	60m Hurdles	Final
3:40 PM	W	60m	Final
3:50 PM	M	60m	Final
Field Events
11:00 AM	M	Pole Vault	Final
11:00 AM	M	High Jump	Final
12:35 PM	W	Shot Put	Final
1:45 PM	W	Pole Vault	Final
2:05 PM	W	Triple Jump	Final
2:10 PM	M	Long Jump	Final
2:30 PM	M	Shot Put	Final

== Entry Standards ==
Events in bold will be contested at the Championships.

Men	Women
60 meters 24-3
6.70	7.40
60 m hurdles 24-3
7.82	8.30
400 meters 20-2
47.20	53.90
800 meters 20-2
(1000 m) 2:22.25	(1000 m) 2:37.55
(800 m) 1:47.75	(800 m) 2:01.50
1500 meters 12-1
(Mile) 3:54.00	(Mile) 4:28.50
(1500 m) 3:37.00	(1500 m) 4:09.00
3000 meters 16-1
(3000 m) 7:46.00	(3000 m) 8:50.00
(5000 m) 13:20.00	(5000 m) 15:15.00
3000 metres race walk 12-1
12:45	14:40
(Mile) 6:25	(Mile) 7:30
(5000 m) 22:00	(5000 m) 24:30
(20 km) 1:36:00	(20 km) 1:48:00
High Jump 12-1
2.18 m (7 ft 1 3/4 in)	1.85 m (6 ft 3/4 in)
Pole Vault 12-1
5.75 m (18 ft 10 1/4 in)	4.60 m (15 ft 1 in)
Long Jump 12-1
7.60 m (24 ft 11 in)	6.35 m (20 ft 10 in)
Triple Jump 12-1
15.50 m (50 ft 10 in)	13.35 m (43 ft 9 1/2 in)
Shot Put 12-1
19.40 m (63 ft 7 3/4 in)	17.75 m (58 ft 2 3/4 in)
Weight Throw 12-1
22.00 m (72 ft 2 in)	23.00 m (75 ft 5 1/2 in)
Heptathlon / Pentathlon 12-1
5450 pts	4250 pts
Decathlon 7700 pts	Heptathlon 5900 pts

January 1, 2022 – February 11, 2023 window.
