= Julian Forde =

Barbadian athlete (born 2001)

Personal information
- Nationality: Barbados
- Born: 22 April 2001 (age 25)

Sport
- Sport: Athletics
- Event: Sprint

Achievements and titles
- Personal bests: 60m: 6.62s (2024); 100m: 10.25s (2022)

Julian Forde (born 22 April 2001) is a Barbadian sprinter.

== Early life ==
He was raised in a religious family and attended Harrison College. He was the Barbados Secondary Schools Athletics Championship winner over 100 metres and 200 metres in 2019.

== Career ==
He competed in the American collegiate system for Louisiana Tech University and North Texas University. He won the 60 metres race at the Arkansas Invitational in 6.70 seconds in January 2024.

He ran a season's best of 6.64 seconds for the 60 metres in 2025. He was selected for the 2025 World Athletics Indoor Championships in Nanjing in March 2025 2025, where he finished in seventh place in the final of the 60 metres race, with a time of 6.64 seconds. He competed in the 100 metres at the 2026 Commonwealth Games in Glasgow, Scotland, without advancing to the semi-finals.
