= Hakim McMorris =

American athlete (born 2000)

Personal information
- Nationality: American
- Born: March 2, 2000 (age 26)

Sport
- Sport: Athletics
- Event: Decathlon

Achievements and titles
- Personal bests: Decathlon: 8599 (Talence, 2026); Heptathlon: 6255 (Indianapolis, 2026)

Hakim McMorris (born 3 March 2000) is an American multi-event athlete. He was the American Indoor Champion of heptathlon in 2026, having finished runner-up in 2025.

== Biography ==
McMorris attended The McCallie School in Chattanooga, Tennessee, prior to attending the University of California, Berkeley. Whilst competing for California, McMorris posted a career-best score of 7941 points for the decathlon in April 2022 at the Mt. SAC Relays.

McMorris won the decathlon representing the United States at the 2024 Thorpe Cup with 8163 points.

McMorris finished runner-up to Kyle Garland in the heptathlon at the 2025 USATF Combined Events Championships in New York, with 6011 points. In April 2025, in Walnut, California, he set a new decathlon personal best in winning the Mt. SAC Relays with 8,258 points.

McMorris won the heptathlon at the 2026 USATF Combined Events Championships on 22 February, finishing ahead of USA 2025 decathlon champion Heath Baldwin, securing a personal best overall score of 6,255 points to narrowly win by 10 points. The score moved him to eighth on the American all-time list. In April, he retained his title at the Mt. Sac Relays with a personal best decathlon score of 8,420. In May, at the Hypo-Meeting in Götzis, McMorris set a personal best in the high jump, clearing 2.03 metres but fell on day two during the hurdles and did not finish. He placed third in decathlon at the 2026 USA Championships behind Garland and returning champion Garrett Scantling. In September 2026, he placed second to Sander Skotheim with a personal best of 8599 points at the Décastar in Talence. He finished the season placed third in the 2026 World Athletics Combined Events Tour rankings.
