= Coby Hilton =

American sprinter (born 1998)

Personal information
- Born: 28 April 1998 (age 28)

Sport
- Sport: Athletics
- Event: Sprinting

Achievements and titles
- Personal best(s): 60m: 6.53 (Lincoln, 2024); 100m: 10.14 (Colorado Springs, 2022); 200m: 20.56 (Colorado Springs, 2022)

Coby Hilton (born 8 April 1998) is an American sprinter. He was runner-up at the 2025 USA Indoor Track and Field Championships over 60 metres.

== Early life ==
From Marshall, Minnesota, he attended Marshall High School and was a 2021 graduate of South Dakota State University. He became the university's fastest-ever 200 metres runner whilst a sophomore, running 20.92 at the South Dakota Challenge in 2019.

== Career ==
In June 2024, he was runner-up in the 100 metres national event at the 2024 BAUHAUS-galan in Stockholm. He reached the semi-finals of the 100 metres at the US Olympic Trials later that month.

He was runner-up to Ronnie Baker at the 2025 USA Indoor Track and Field Championships, running 6.58 seconds for the 60 metres and finishing four-thousandths of a second ahead of third placed Emmanuel Wells. He was selected for the 2025 World Athletics Indoor Championships in Nanjing in March 2025.
