= Cameron Crump =

American long jumper (born 1999)

Personal information
- Nationality: American
- Born: September 3, 1999 (age 26)

Sport
- Sport: Athletics
- Event: Long jump

Achievements and titles
- Personal best(s): Long jump: 8.39m (2023); 100m: 9.99 (2026)

Cameron Crump (born 3 September 1999) is an American long jumper and sprinter.

== Early life ==
He attended Strayhorn High School in Sarah, Mississippi, and won state high school titles as a jumper and a sprinter.

== Career ==
Competing for Mississippi State University, he finished thirteenth at the NCAA Championships in 2021, and sixth at the NCAA Indoor Championships in 2022, with a jump of 7.65 meters to earn first-team all-American status and become the first Mississippi State athlete to be named an all-American since 1989. He won the SEC Indoor title in February 2023, with a personal best distance of 8.39 metres. He finished third behind Jamaicans Wayne Pinnock and Carey McLeod with 8.00 metres at the 2023 SEC Outdoor Championships in May 2023.

He was runner-up at the 2025 USA Indoor Track and Field Championships in New York, on 23 February 2025. He was selected for the 2025 World Athletics Indoor Championships in Nanjing in March 2025.

Crump competed in the long jump at the 2026 USA Indoor Track and Field Championships in New York, placing fifth overall. Competing in the 100 metres at the Music City Track Carnival in Cleveland, Tennessee in May 2026, Crump was timed at breaking the ten-second barrier with a time of 9.99 seconds, finishing behind Sam Blaskowski.
