= Naimette-Xhovémont =

Neighborhood in Liège, Belgium

Coordinates: 50°39′01″N 5°33′40″E

Naimette-Xhovémont (French pronunciation: [nɛmɛt (h)ɔvemɔ̃]) is a quarter in the district of Saint Walburga within the city of Liège, Wallonia, located in the province of Liège, Belgium. It is situated south-east of the river Meuse, on its left bank. The area is sometimes called the Montmartre of Liège because of the vibrant life on the steep cobbled streets, plus magnificent gardens which are sometimes open to the public.

The sports complex of Liège Province is located on the hill and is used by RFC Athletics and Rugby RFC Liège. A second rugby stadium is scheduled for completion in late summer 2014.

The name of the neighbourhood inspired the giant Xhovémont mascot of RFC Liège Rugby.
