= Steamboat Springs High School =

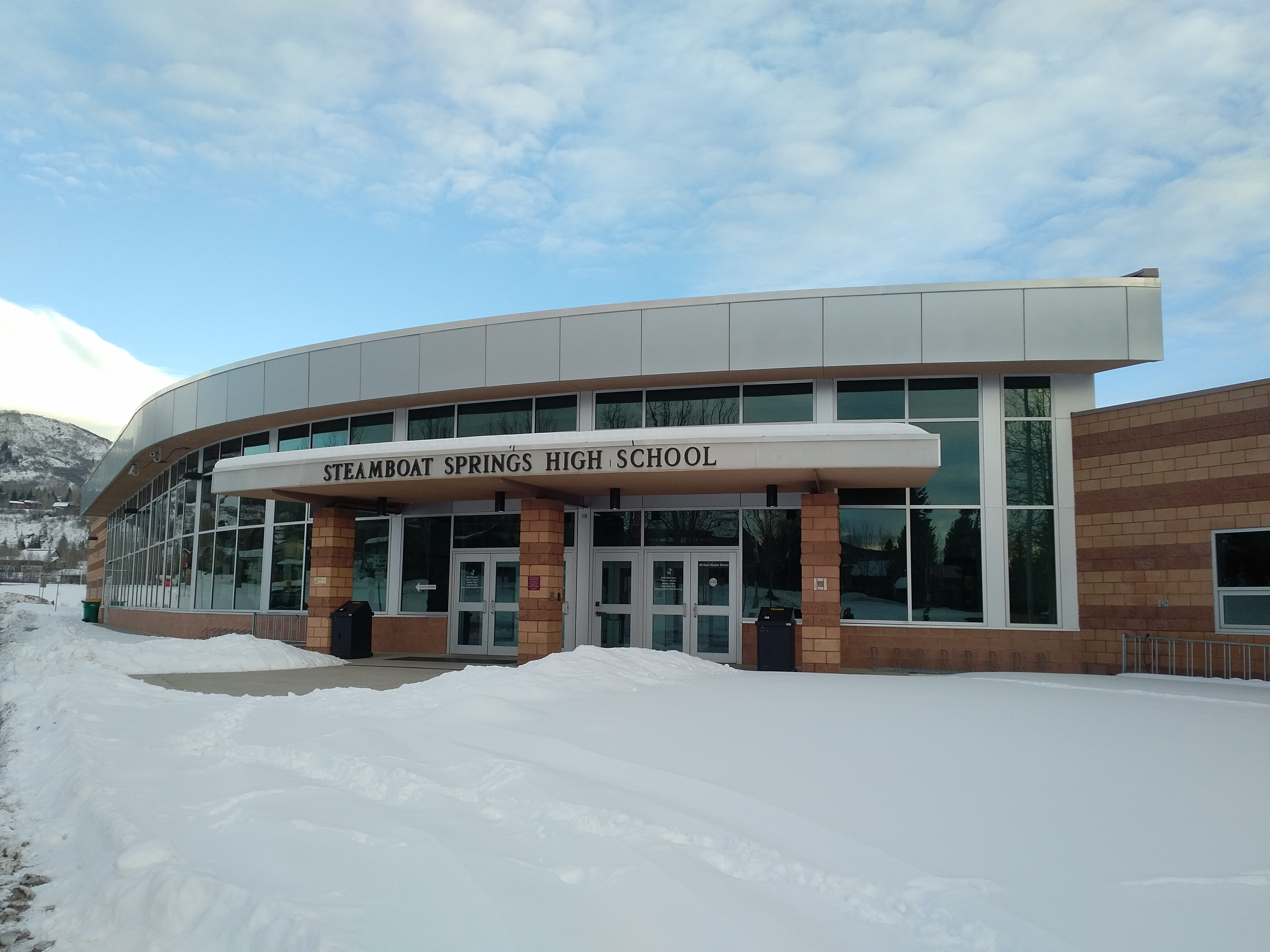
- Front entrance Steamboat Springs High School

Location
- 45 E. Maple Street; Steamboat Springs, Colorado 80487; United States; 40°29′08″N 106°49′22″W

Information
- CEEB code: 061310
- Teaching staff: 50.79 (FTE)
- Grades: 9-12
- Enrollment: 845 (2023–2024)
- Student to teacher ratio: 16.64
- Colors: Red and white
- Mascot: Sailor
- Website: sshs.steamboatschools.net

Steamboat Springs High School, nicknamed "Home of the Sailors," is a high school located at 45 E. Maple Street in Steamboat Springs, Colorado, United States.

In 2014, it had 626 students in grades 9–12, and 41 teachers . The student body was half male and half female, and minority enrollment was 12 percent.

The school includes many clubs and groups, such as Science Olympiad, French and Spanish Clubs, Math Club, Interact, Future Business Leaders of America, Drama Troupe, Gnosis Magazine, Fly Fishing Club, and Knowledge Bowl.
