= Nia Akins =

American athlete (born 1998)

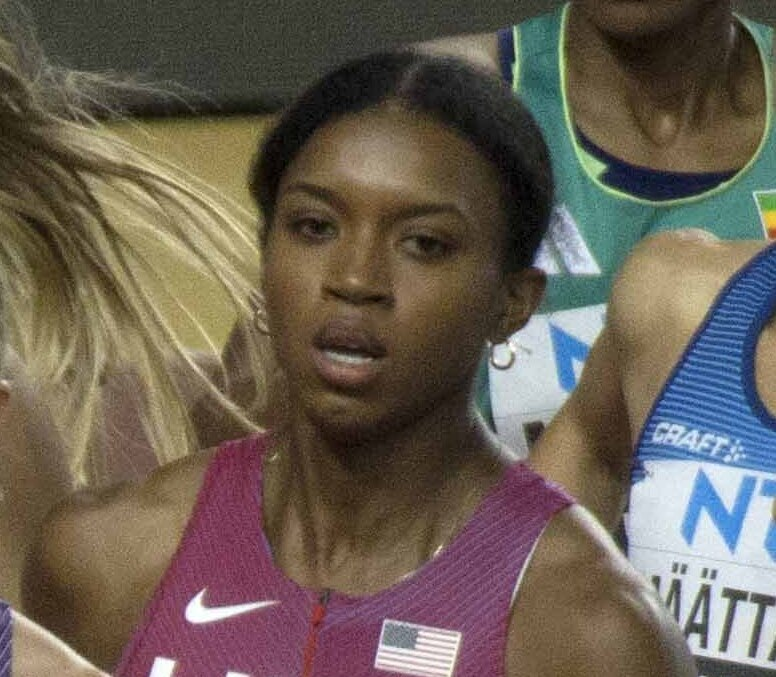
- Akins at the 2023 World Athletics Championships

Personal information
- Nationality: American
- Born: July 7, 1998 (age 28)

Sport
- Sport: Athletics
- Event: 800m

Achievements and titles
- Personal bests: 800m: (1:57.36 Eugene, Oregon, 2024)
Medal record
Women's athletics
Representing United States
NACAC Championships
Gold medal – first place	2025 Freeport	800 m

Nia Akins (born July 7, 1998) is an American middle-distance runner. A multiple-time national champion over 800 metres; both indoors and outdoors she has represented the United States at multiple global championships. She won her first national titles outdoors in 2023 and 2024 and regained the title in 2026. She won the indoors title in 2023 and 2025.

== Early life ==
From San Diego, the daughter of Nicol Hodges and Marlon Akins, she attended Rancho Bernardo High School before attending the University of Pennsylvania in 2016. On May 18, 2020, she graduated from the University of Pennsylvania's School of Nursing.

== Career ==
Competing at a collegiate level, she was a two-time NCAA 800m runner-up. At the 2019 NACAC U23 Championships, she won a silver medal in the 800m in Queretaro, Mexico.

Akins was the only runner to turn pro in 2020, having run the second-fastest 800m time in NCAA history of 2:00.71 at the Boston Invitational. She moved to Seattle to train under Danny Mackey with the Brooks Beasts Track Club, alongside athletes such as Olympic medalist Josh Kerr, and Allie Ostrander.

In July 2022, she ran a new personal best time of 1:58.78 in Memphis, Tennessee.

In February 2023, Akins won the US national indoor 800m title, in Albuquerque, New Mexico. She started her 2023 outdoor season with victories at both of her outdoor 800m races, running a 1:59.37 at the Portland Track Festival and then a 1:59.76 in Portland on June 24, 2023.

Competing at the 2023 USA Outdoor Track and Field Championships, in Eugene, Oregon, she reached the final of the 800m competition as the fastest qualifier and won the final ahead of Raevyn Rogers. She was selected for the 2023 World Athletics Championships in Budapest in August 2023. She ran a new personal best in the final, running 1:57.73 in finishing sixth. She also made her Diamond League debut in August 2023, finishing fourth in the 800 metres in Zürich.

Akins won the 800m at the US Olympic Trials in Eugene, Oregon, on June 24, 2024. She competed in the 800 metres at the 2024 Summer Olympics in Paris in August 2024, reaching the semi-finals.

She won the 800 metres title at the 2025 USA Indoor Track and Field Championships. She was selected for the 2025 World Athletics Indoor Championships in Nanjing in March 2025, where she qualified for the semi-finals. She fell after only 100 metres of her semi-final, but kept running and almost qualified for the final, finishing just 0.18 seconds short.

In May 2025, she was named as a challenger for the short distance category at the 2025 Grand Slam Track event in Philadelphia. She reached the final of the 800 metres at the 2025 USA Outdoor Track and Field Championships, winning her semi-final in 1:58.09. She was leading until the last 100 metres in the final, running 1:59.52 to finish fourth. She won the gold medal in the 800 metres competing for the United States at the 2025 NACAC Championships in Freeport, The Bahamas.

Akins had a low-key start to racing in 2026 after suffering ill-effects from a motor vehicle accident, but went into the 800 metres at the 2026 USA Championships in New York in July with an unbeaten record in the season, albeit in small local races. Having won her semi-final, Akins remained unbeaten and won her third national title over 800 metres in four years on 26 July, moving from the back of the field to the front in the final quarter of the race to win in 1:59.25, ahead of Addy Wiley, Meghan Hunter and defending champion Roisin Willis.

== Statistics ==
=== International competitions ===
Representing the United States
Year	Competition	Venue	Position	Event	Time
2023	World Athletics Championships	Budapest, Hungary	6th	800 m	1:57.73
2024	Olympic Games	Paris, France	10th (sf)	800 m	1:58.20
2025	World Indoor Championships	Nanjing, China	9th (sf)	800 m	2:04.38
2025	NACAC Championships	Freeport, The Bahamas	1st	800m	1:59.75

=== National championships ===
Year	Competition	Venue	Position	Event	Time
2019	USA Outdoor Track and Field Championships	Des Moines, Iowa	7th	800m	2:04.39
2021	Olympic Trials	Eugene, Oregon	9th	800m	2:12.87
2022	USA Indoor Track and Field Championships	Spokane, Washington	7th	800m	2:05.88
2022	USA Outdoor Track and Field Championships	Eugene, Oregon	11th	800m	2:01.90
2023	USA Indoor Track and Field Championships	Albuquerque, New Mexico	1st	800m	2:00.16
2023	USA Outdoor Track and Field Championships	Eugene, Oregon	1st	800m	1:59.50
2024	USA Indoor Track and Field Championships	Albuquerque, New Mexico	3rd	800m	2:00.90
2024	USA Olympic Trials	Eugene, Oregon	1st	800m	1:57.36
2025	USATF Indoor Championships	New York City, New York	1st	800m	1:59.31
2025	USATF Outdoor Championships	Eugene, Oregon	4th	800m	1:59.52
2026	USATF Outdoor Championships	New York City, New York	1st	800m	1:59.25

=== Circuit performances ===
Grand Slam Track results
Slam	Race group	Event	Pl.	Time	Prize money
2025 Philadelphia Slam	Short distance	1500 m	8th	DNF	US$10,000
2025 Philadelphia Slam	Short distance	800 m		2:13.07	US$10,000

== Personal life ==
Akins is also a musician who records her own music.
