= Rachel Richeson =

American hammer thrower

Personal information
- Born: Rachel Tanczos; September 27, 1999 (age 26) Danielsville, Pennsylvania
- Education: University of Notre Dame '21 '22; Bethlehem Catholic High School '17
- Spouse: Cade Richeson

Sport
- Sport: Athletics
- Event: Hammer throw
- Turned pro: 2022

Achievements and titles
- World finals: 2025
- Personal best: Hammer: 79.33m (2026)

Rachel Richeson (née Tanczos; born September 27, 1999) is an American track and field athlete. She won the American national title at the 2025 USA Indoor Track and Field Championships in the weight throw.

== Early life ==
She attended Bethlehem Catholic High School in Pennsylvania where she was part of the volleyball team, and was a hurdler and jumper before focusing on throwing events. She later attended University of Notre Dame from 2017, where her father Dan had been an American football player, with the desire to pursue the hammer throw.

== NCAA ==
Rachel Tanczos at University of Notre Dame won the 2019 Weight Throw title at Atlantic Coast Conference Indoor Track and Field Championships and graduated as a 5-time NCAA Division I All-American.

Year	Competition	Venue	Position	Event	Notes
Representing University of Notre Dame
2022	NCAA Outdoor T&F Championships	University of Oregon	10th	Hammer	67.35 m
2022	NCAA Indoor T&F Championships	Birmingham CrossPlex	4th	Weight Throw	23.06 m
2021	NCAA Outdoor T&F Championships	University of Oregon	17th	Hammer	65.03 m
2021	NCAA Indoor T&F Championships	University of Arkansas	2nd	Weight Throw	23.24 m
2020	NCAA Indoor T&F Championships	Albuquerque, New Mexico	All-American	Weight Throw	cancelled due to COVID-19

== Professional career ==
She won the bronze medal at the 2023 USA Indoor Track and Field Championships in Albuquerque, New Mexico with a personal best 24.58 metres for the weight throw.

She won the 2025 USA Indoor Track and Field Championships in the Weight Throw in New York in February 2025, with a throw of 25.26 metres.

In April 2025, she won the hammer throw at the Oklahoma Throws Series, a World Athletics Continental Tour Bronze meeting in Ramona, Oklahoma, with a personal best throw of 78.80 metres, a distance which moved her to fifth place on the world all-time list. She finished third overall in the hammer throw at the 2025 USA Outdoor Track and Field Championships. She placed fourth in at the 2025 Kamila Skolimowska Memorial, in Poland, on August 16. In September 2025, she competed in the hammer throw at the 2025 World Championships in Tokyo, Japan.

On 28 March 2026, she won the hammer throw at the USATF Winter Long Throws National Championship in Arizona with a throw of 76.86 metres. On 6 June she threw a personal best 79.33m to place second to Camryn Rogers at the USATF Lone Star Grand Prix in College Station, Texas. In July, she placed second in the hammer throw at the 2026 USA Championships.
