= Sam Prakel =

American runner (born 1994)

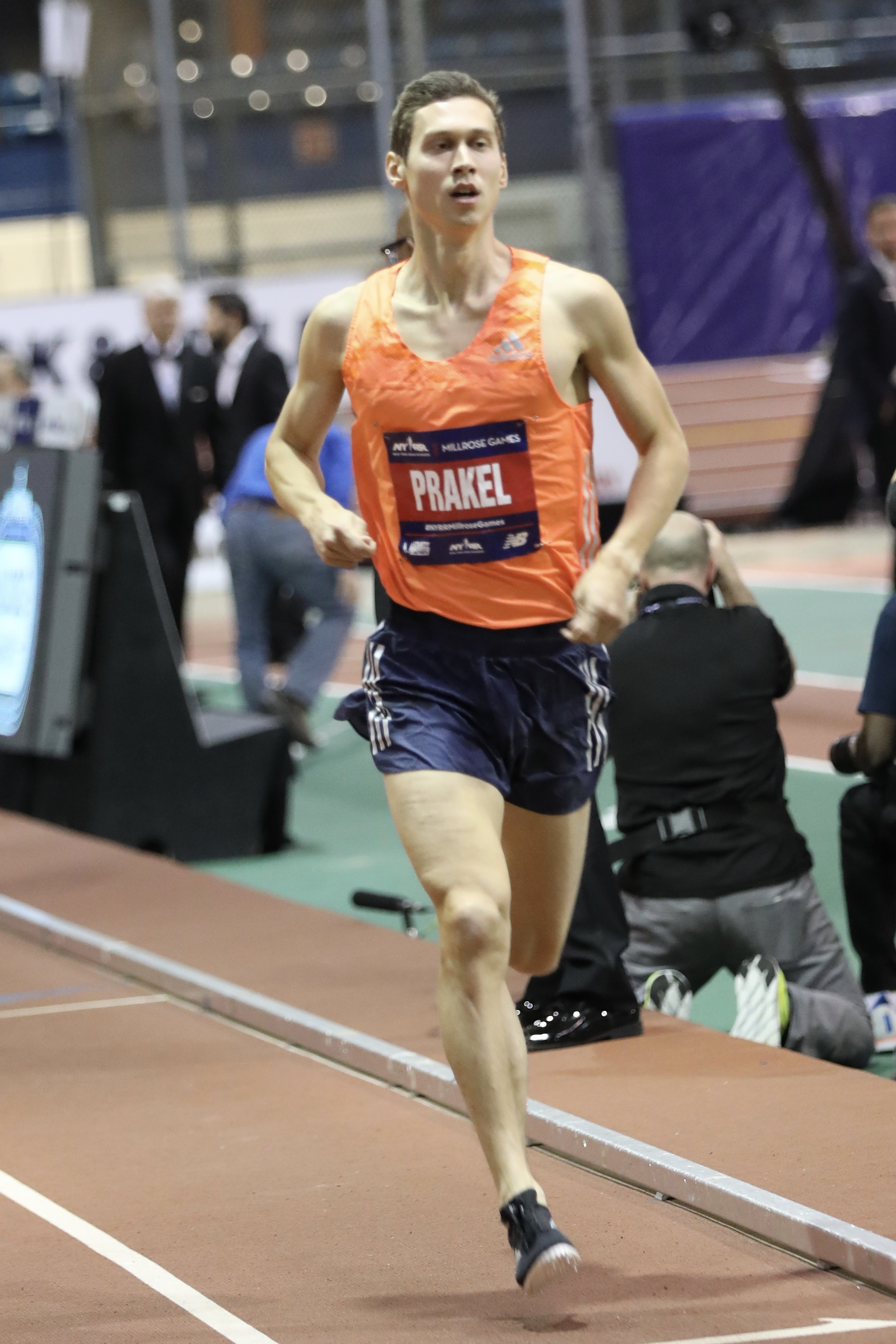

Personal information
- Full name: Samuel Prakel
- Born: 29 October 1994 (age 31) Versailles, Ohio, U.S.
- Education: Versailles High School

Sport
- Sport: Athletics
- Events: 800 metres, 1500 metres, Mile, 3000 metres
- College team: Oregon Ducks
- Club: Adidas
- Turned pro: 2018

Achievements and titles
- Highest world ranking: 19 (1500m)
Medal record
Representing United States
World Road Running Championships
Bronze medal – third place	2023 Riga	1 mile

Samuel Prakel (born 29 October 1994) is an American middle- and long-distance runner, who competes for Adidas. His personal best time in the indoor mile is 3:50.94, tied for 13th all-time. He competed collegiately for the Oregon Ducks, where he was a five-time All American and won the 1500m at the 2018 Pac-12 Championships.

== High school career ==
Prakel attended Versailles High School in Ohio. During his time there he was a two-time Ohio Division III state champion in cross country winning the race in 2011 and 2012. His senior year he was a Footlocker Nationals qualifier and won Ohio Gatorade Cross Country Runner of the Year.

On the track, Prakel was a four-time state champion winning the 3200m in 2012, the 800m in 2013, and the 1600m in both 2012 and 2013. Immediately after his senior season he finished third in the 1,500 meters at the 2013 U.S. Junior Championships, running a 3:46.93.

== Collegiate career ==
Prakel attended the University of Oregon training alongside teammates such as Edward Cheserek, Eric Jenkins, Mac Fleet, and Cooper Teare among others. He finished his time there as a five-time All-American and the 2018 Pac-12 1,500m Champion.

== Professional career ==
On July 31, 2018, he announced via an Instagram post he had signed a professional contract with Adidas.

In March 2022 Prakel represented the United States at the 2022 World Athletics Indoor Championships in Belgrade, Serbia where he ran a 3:38.40 1500m, finishing 9th overall.

At the 2023 USA Indoor Track and Field Championships, Prakel won both the 1500m and 3000m. However, Prakel initially finished second in the 1500m to Josh Thompson, who was later disqualified for inhibiting Henry Wynne in the final 100 meters, with Prakel therefore given the title.

On April 25, 2023 in Des Moines, Iowa, he set the world record for the road mile with a time of 4:01.21.

On October 1, 2023 Prakel represented the United States at the World Road Running Championships. He won bronze in the road mile in a time of 3:56.43. During the pre-race press conference Prakel stated that he had postponed his wedding by a week in order to compete at the event.

== Competition record ==
=== USA Championships ===
Representing adidas
Year	Competition	Venue	Position	Event	Time
2016	US Olympic Trials	Eugene, Oregon	SF1 6th	1500 m	3:48.55
2017	USA Championships	Sacramento, California	7th	1500 m	3:45.02
2018	USA Championships	Des Moines, Iowa	7th	1500 m	3:44.01
2019	USA Indoor Championships	New York City	4th	Mile	4:01.76
2019	USA Championships	Des Moines, Iowa	6th	1500 m	3:46.09
2020	USA Indoor Championships	Albuquerque, New Mexico	7th	1500 m	3:47.84
2021	US Olympic Trials	Eugene, Oregon	9th	1500 m	3:38.67
2022	USA Indoor Championships	Spokane, Washington	4th	1500 m	3:39.92
2022	USA Championships	Eugene, Oregon	8th	1500 m	3:46.43
2023	USA Indoor Championships	Albuquerque, New Mexico	1st	3000 m	8:12.46
2023	USA Indoor Championships	Albuquerque, New Mexico	1st	1500 m	3:42.62
2023	USA Championships	Eugene, Oregon	4th	1500 m	3:35.83
2024	USA Indoor Championships	Albuquerque, New Mexico	6th	1500 m	3:40.04
2024	US Olympic Trials	Eugene, Oregon	SF1 6th	1500 m	3:38.50
2024	US Olympic Trials	Eugene, Oregon	16th	5000 m	14:17.87
2025	USA Championships	Eugene, Oregon	9th	1500 m	3:33.70

== Personal bests ==
Surface	Event	Time	Date	Venue	Notes
Indoor track	1000m	2:19.87	January 12, 2019	Dempsey Indoor Center	Not legal
Indoor track	One mile	3:50.94	March 3, 2019	Boston University	
Indoor track	3000m	7:53.82	January 25, 2020	The Armory	
Indoor track	5000m	13:15.96	December 3, 2022	Boston University	
Outdoor track	800m	1:46.39	June 11, 2022	Griswold Stadium	
Outdoor track	1000m	2:18.15	July 17, 2020	Finn Rock, Oregon	
Outdoor track	1500m	3:33.08	July 31, 2025	Hayward Field	
Outdoor track	One mile	3:54.64	August 3, 2018	Raleigh, NC	
Outdoor track	3000m	7:46.06	January 15, 2022	Seattle	
Outdoor track	One Mile Road	3:47.7	July 23, 2022	Cleveland, OH	Not legal
Outdoor track	5000m	13:41.79	December 4, 2020	San Juan Capistrano, CA	
