= Emmanuel Wells =

American sprinter (born 1997)

Personal information
- Born: 20 October 1997 (age 29)

Sport
- Sport: Athletics
- Event: Sprinting

Achievements and titles
- Personal bests: 60m: 6.48 (Spokane, 2024); 100m: 10.26 (Tucson, 2019); 200m: 20.88 (Tucson, 2019)

Emmanuel Wells (born 20 October 1997) is an American sprinter. He finished third at the 2025 USA Indoor Track and Field Championships over 60 metres.

== Early life ==
He is from Seattle, he attended Rainier Beach High School, Central Arizona College and Washington State University.

== Career ==
Competing for the Washington State Cougars in the Pac-12 Conference Track and Field Championships in Tucson, Arizona in 2019, Wells placed third in the 100 metres with a time of 10.26 seconds and fourth in the 200 metres with a time of 20.88 seconds. in 2020 he won the Pac-12 60m Conference Championship By 2021, he was the program-record holder over 60 metres.

He finished fourth at the 2024 USA Indoor National Track and Field Championships in New Mexico. Third at the 2025 USA Indoor Track and Field Championships in New York, running 6.48 seconds in the 60 metres, He was selected for the 2025 World Athletics Indoor Championships in Nanjing, China, in March 2025.

Wells was also a finalist in the 60 metres at the 2026 USA Indoor Track and Field Championships in New York.

== Personal life ==
Nicknamed "RayRay", in October 2020 when video of him from training emerged, and went viral, of him cleanly clearing a 61-inch hurdle (155 centimetres), with a bunny hop, in his socks. Wells later worked as a high school track coach at Kennedy Catholic in Washington.
