= Erin Reese =

American athlete (born 1995)

Erin Barnes ( Reese )
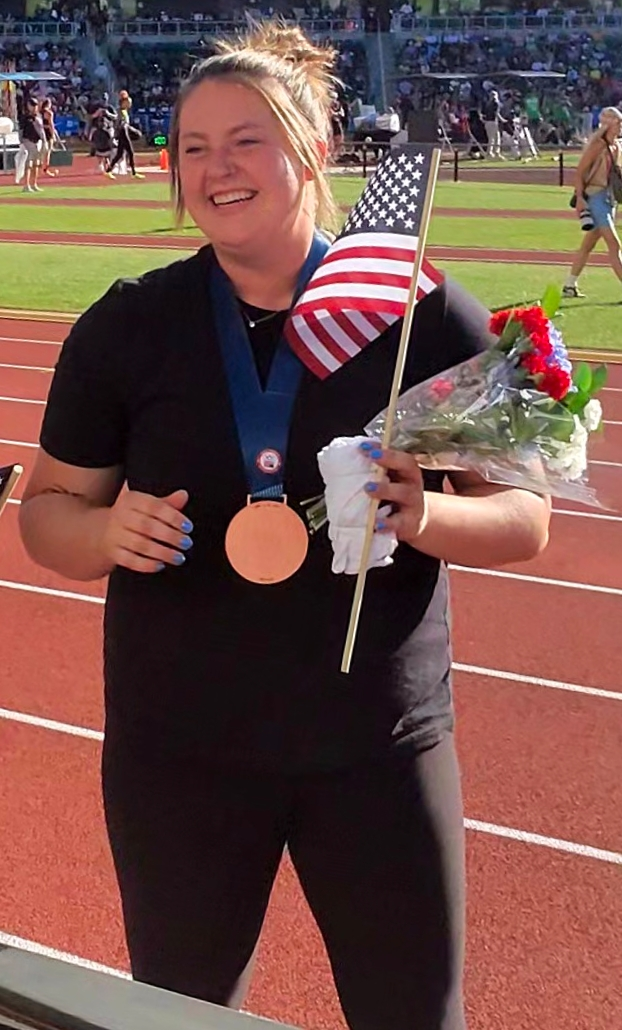
- Barnes (Reese) at the 2024 United States Olympic trials

Personal information
- Nationality: American
- Born: December 4, 1995 (age 30)
- Home town: Mount Prospect, Illinois, U.S.

Sport
- Sport: Athletics
- Event: Hammer throw

Achievements and titles
- Personal bests: Hammer: 76.76m (2026); Weigh throw: 25.73m (2023)

Erin Reese (born December 4, 1995) is an American hammer thrower. In 2024, she became national indoor champion in the weight throw achieving the second furthest all-time throw worldwide.

== Early life ==
Reese is from Mount Prospect, Illinois. She attended Prospect High School.

== Career ==
On February 17, 2024, she became national champion in the weight throw with a distance of 25.73 metres in Albuquerque, New Mexico. This distance placed her second all-time in the discipline.

In June 2024, she placed third at the 2024 United States Olympic trials in Eugene, Oregon in the hammer throw. She subsequently competed in the hammer throw at the 2024 Paris Olympics.

In July 2026, she placed third in the hammer throw at the 2026 USA Championships with a throw of 72.94 metres.

== Personal life ==
Erin attended the University of Dayton in the fall of 2015. As a Flyer, Reese eventually broke both the school records in the discus and the hammer throw, competing at the national level in both events. Reese is an Indiana State University psychology graduate and worked in 2024 in behavioral health with school children with various needs. Erin married former Indiana State Track & Field teammate Joseph Barnes in October 2023
