= 2018 European Athletics Championships – Men's 4 × 100 metres relay =

Men's 4 × 100 metres relay at the 2018 European Athletics Championships
- Venue: Olympic Stadium
- Location: Berlin
- Dates: 12 August 2018
- Competitors: 65 from 16 nations
- Winning time: 37.80

Medalists
gold medal	Chijindu Ujah; Zharnel Hughes; Adam Gemili; Harry Aikines-Aryeetey; Nethaneel Mitchell-Blake*	Great Britain
silver medal	Emre Zafer Barnes; Jak Ali Harvey; Yiğitcan Hekimoglu; Ramil Guliyev	Turkey
bronze medal	Chris Garia; Churandy Martina; Hensley Paulina; Taymir Burnet	Netherlands

The Men's 4 × 100 metres relay at the 2018 European Athletics Championships took place at the Olympic Stadium on 12 August.

== Records ==
Standing records prior to the 2018 European Athletics Championships
World record	Jamaica; Nesta Carter, Michael Frater; Yohan Blake, Usain Bolt	36.84	London, Great Britain	11 August 2012
European record	Great Britain; Chijindu Ujah, Adam Gemili; Daniel Talbot, Nethaneel Mitchell-Blake	37.47	London, Great Britain	12 August 2017
Championship record	France; Max Moriniere, Daniel Sangouma; Jean-Charles Trouabal, Bruno Marie-Rose	37.79	Split, Yugoslavia	1 September 1990
World Leading	Great Britain; Chijindu Ujah, Zharnel Hughes; Adam Gemili, Nethaneel Mitchell-Blake	37.61	London, Great Britain	22 July 2018
European Leading	Great Britain; Chijindu Ujah, Zharnel Hughes; Adam Gemili, Nethaneel Mitchell-Blake	37.61	London, Great Britain	22 July 2018

== Schedule ==
Date	Time	Round
12 August 2018	19:40	Round 1
12 August 2018	21:35	Final

== Results ==
=== Round 1 ===
First 3 in each heat (Q) and 2 best performers (q) advance to the Final.

Rank	Heat	Lane	Nation	Athletes	Time	Notes
1	1	6	Great Britain	Chijindu Ujah, Zharnel Hughes, Adam Gemili, Nethaneel Mitchell-Blake	37.84	Q
2	1	3	Netherlands	Chris Garia, Churandy Martina, Hensley Paulina, Taymir Burnet	38.30	Q
3	1	7	Turkey	Emre Zafer Barnes, Jak Ali Harvey, Yiğitcan Hekimoglu, Ramil Guliyev	38.30	Q, =NR
4	2	7	France	Mickaël-Méba Zeze, Marvin René, Stuart Dutamby, Mouhamadou Fall	38.62	Q
5	2	8	Ukraine	Oleksandr Sokolov, Emil Ibrahimov, Volodymyr Suprun, Serhiy Smelyk	38.86	Q, SB
6	1	4	Czech Republic	Zdeněk Stromšík, Jan Veleba, Jan Jirka, Pavel Maslák	38.94	q, SB
7	1	8	Portugal	José Lopes, Diogo Antunes, Frederico Curvelo, Carlos Nascimento	39.09	q, SB
8	2	3	Finland	Eetu Rantala, Otto Ahlfors, Oskari Lehtonen, Samuel Purola	39.11	Q, NR
9	2	2	Spain	Patrick Chinedu Ike, Pol Retamal, Daniel Rodríguez, Ángel David Rodríguez	39.12	SB
10	2	6	Switzerland	Suganthan Somasundaram, Silvan Wicki, Florian Clivaz, Alex Wilson	39.13	SB
11	1	1	Greece	Efthímios Steryioúlis, Ioánnis Nifadópoulos, Panayiótis Trivizás, Lykourgos-Stefanos Tsakonas	39.49	SB
12	1	2	Romania	Costin Florian Homiuc, Alexandru Terpezan, Ionuț Neagoe, Petre Rezmiveș	39.63	
	2	1	Germany	Kevin Kranz, Patrick Domogala, Julian Reus, Lucas Jakubczyk	DNF	
	1	5	Sweden	Dennis Leal, Stefan Tärnhuvud, Felix Svensson, Tony Darkwah	DNF	
	2	5	Poland	Eryk Hampel, Remigiusz Olszewski, Dominik Kopeć, Przemysław Słowikowski	DQ	163.3 (a)
	2	4	Italy	Federico Cattaneo, Fausto Desalu, Davide Manenti, Filippo Tortu	DQ	170.7

=== Final ===
Rank	Lane	Nation	Athletes	Time	Notes
1st place, gold medalist(s)	5	Great Britain	Chijindu Ujah, Zharnel Hughes, Adam Gemili, Harry Aikines-Aryeetey	37.80	
2nd place, silver medalist(s)	8	Turkey	Emre Zafer Barnes, Jak Ali Harvey, Yiğitcan Hekimoglu, Ramil Guliyev	37.98	NR
3rd place, bronze medalist(s)	6	Netherlands	Chris Garia, Churandy Martina, Hensley Paulina, Taymir Burnet	38.03	NR
4	3	France	Mickaël-Méba Zeze, Marvin René, Stuart Dutamby, Mouhamadou Fall	38.51	SB
5	4	Ukraine	Oleksandr Sokolov, Emil Ibrahimov, Volodymyr Suprun, Serhiy Smelyk	38.71	SB
6	7	Finland	Eetu Rantala, Otto Ahlfors, Oskari Lehtonen, Samuel Purola	38.92	NR
7	1	Portugal	José Lopes, Diogo Antunes, Frederico Curvelo, Carlos Nascimento	39.07	SB
	2	Czech Republic	Zdeněk Stromšík, Jan Veleba, Jan Jirka, Pavel Maslák	DNS	
