= 2021 World Athletics Relays – Men's 4 × 100 metres relay =

Athlete Relay

Men's 4 × 100 metres relay at the 2021 World Athletics Relays
- Venue: Silesian Stadium, Chorzów
- Dates: 1 May (heats) & 2 May (final)
- Nations: 18
- Winning time: 39.21

Medalists
gold medal	Fausto Desalu; Marcell Jacobs; Davide Manenti; Filippo Tortu	Italy
silver medal	Ryuichiro Sakai; Ryota Suzuki; Daisuke Miyamoto; Hiroki Yanagita	Japan
bronze medal	Simon Hansen; Tazana Kamanga-Dyrbak; Kojo Musah; Frederik Schou-Nielsen	Denmark

The men's 4 × 100 metres relay at the 2021 World Athletics Relays has been held at the Silesian Stadium on 1 and 2 May.

Only 18 teams participated of 24 possible qualifiers, with the USA (CR), Jamaica (WR), Canada, Great Britain, Trinidad and Tobago, and China (WL) not entering. On the 19 teams qualified by entry standard (38.80), Thailand and Chinese Taipei also declined to participate, same as Australia, first of the following top list. The 10 best placed teams will qualify for the 2022 World Championships in Eugene.

5 nations which made the men’s 4x100m final at the 2019 IAAF World Athletics Championships in Doha are entered – Brazil, France, Japan, the Netherlands and South Africa – their qualification for Tokyo is also already secured. The 8 finalist teams will join them if different ones.

== Records ==
Prior to the competition, the records were as follows:

World record	Jamaica (Nesta Carter, Michael Frater, Yohan Blake, Usain Bolt)	36.84	(United Kingdom) London, Great Britain	11 August 2012
Championships record	United States (Mike Rodgers, Justin Gatlin, Tyson Gay, Ryan Bailey)	37.38	(The Bahamas) Nassau, Bahamas	2 May 2015
World Leading	China (Su Bingtian, Xie Zhenye, Wu Zhiqiang, Wang Zhihong)	38.29	Shenzhen, China	20 March 2021

== Program ==
- Heats : Saturday 1 May 2021, 20:39 (weather: 11 °C).
- Final: Sunday 2 May 2021, 19:35 (weather: 7 °C).

== Preview ==
According to World Athletics, there were 2 teams who were possible favorite winners:

- Brazil: Paulo André de Oliveira returns to World Relays and he is again joined by his 2019 teammates Rodrigo do Nascimento and Derick Silva. That trio was also part of the quartet which finished fourth at the 2019 IAAF World Championships in Doha, clocking 37.72 (AR), along with Felipe dos Santos.
- South Africa: Akani Simbine, who has already been under 10 seconds 3 times this season. He, Thando Dlodlo, Simon Magakwe and Clarence Munyai combined to clock an African record of 37.65 (AR) in the Doha heats, going on to finish 5th in the final, with Dlodlo and Munyai joining Simbine among South Africa’s team entries, along with Gift Leotlela.

There are 6 possible runners-up for the final:

- France: 37.88, features 2016 Olympic 200m bronze medallist Christophe Lemaitre (not in the heats), who helped his nation to bronze at the London 2012 Games, along with Amaury Golitin, Mouhamadou Fall and Méba-Mickaël Zeze.
- The Netherlands: 37.91 (NR). The Dutch entries include Doha team members Joris van Gool, Taymir Burnet, Hensley Paulina and Churandy Martina, along with Chris Garia.
- Japan: 37.43 (AR), home Olympics, and following silver at the Rio Games and world bronze in Doha, Japan is fielding a largely developmental squad including Ryuichiro Sakai (1st leg), Ryota Suzuki (2nd), Daisuke Miyamoto (3rd) and Hiroki Yanagita (Final leg).
- Italy: 38.11 (NR) while European indoor 60m champion Marcell Jacobs has been named on the Italian team along with national 100m record-holder Filippo Tortu, along with Fausto Desalu and Davide Manenti.
- Germany: 38.24 with Julian Reus, who formed part of European medal-winning teams from 2012-2016, is in the German squad.
- Ghana: 38.24 with Benjamin Azamati-Kwaku.

6 more teams to complete the 10 World Championships qualifiers:

- Czech Republic: 38.62 (NR) with Zdeněk Stromšík, Jan Veleba, Jan Jirka and Dominik Záleský.
- Turkey: 38.47 while 2017 world 200m champion Ramil Guliyev is among the team entries, with former Jamaicans Jak Ali Harvey and Emre Zafer Barnes.
- ~~NGR 38.59~~ with Divine Oduduru (renounced to participate for visa reasons).
- UKR: 38.84 with Emil Ibrahimov, Erik Kostrytsya, Stanislav Kovalenko and Serhiy Smelyk.
- ZIM: 38.95 (NR) with Ngoni Makusha.
- POL: 39.20. The host nation squad features Adrian Brzeziński (3rd leg), Dominik Kopeć (2nd), Karol Kwiatkowski, Rafał Pająk, Mateusz Siuda (1st), Przemysław Słowikowski (Final leg) and Łukasz Żok.

== Results ==
KEY:	Q	Qualified	q	Qualified as fastest times	WL	World leading	NR	National record	SB	Seasonal best	OG	2020 Olympic Games qualification	WC	2022 World Championships qualification

=== Heats ===
Heats Qualification: First 2 of each heat (Q) plus the 2 fastest times (q) advanced to the final.

Rank	Heat	Nation	Athletes	Time	Notes
1	3	Italy	Fausto Desalu, Marcell Jacobs, Davide Manenti, Filippo Tortu	38.45	Q, EL, *OG, *WC
2	2	Brazil	Rodrigo do Nascimento, Felipe dos Santos, Derick Silva, Paulo André de Oliveira	38.45	Q, SB, *WC
3	3	South Africa	Thando Dlodlo, Gift Leotlela, Clarence Munyai, Akani Simbine	~~38.49~~DQ	Q, SB, *WC
4	2	Germany	Julian Reus, Joshua Hartmann, Deniz Almas, Marvin Schulte	38.70	Q, SB, *OG, *WC
5	1	Netherlands	Joris van Gool, Taymir Burnet, Chris Garia, Churandy Martina	38.79	Q, SB, *WC
6	1	Ghana	Sean Safo-Antwi, Benjamin Azamati-Kwaku, Joseph Oduro Manu, Joseph Paul Amoah	38.79	Q, SB, *OG, *WC
7	2	Japan	Ryuichiro Sakai, Ryota Suzuki, Daisuke Miyamoto, Hiroki Yanagita	38.98	q, SB, *WC
8	2	Denmark	Simon Hansen, Tazana Kamanga-Dyrbak, Kojo Musah, Frederik Schou-Nielsen	39.06	q, NR, *OG, *WC
9	1	Ukraine	Erik Kostrytsya, Emil Ibrahimov, Stanislav Kovalenko, Serhiy Smelyk	39.06	SB, *WC
10	3	France	Amaury Golitin, Marvin René, Méba-Mickaël Zeze, Mouhamadou Fall	39.08	SB, *WC
11	1	Spain	José González, Pol Retamal, Jesús Gómez, Sergio López	39.30	SB, *WC
12	2	Poland	Mateusz Siuda, Dominik Kopeć, Adrian Brzeziński, Przemysław Słowikowski	39.34	SB
13	3	Botswana	Thapelo Monaiwa, Letsile Tebogo, Karabo Mothibi, Thuto Masasa	39.55	SB
14	1	Turkey	Emre Zafer Barnes, Jak Ali Harvey, Ertan Özkan, Ramil Guliyev	39.59	SB
15	3	Belarus	Dzianis Bliznets, Stanislau Darahakupets, Siarhei Pustabayeu, Yury Zabalotny	40.01	SB
16	2	Zimbabwe	Dickson Kamungeremu, Makanakaishe Charamba, Rodwell Leroy Ndlovu, Ngoni Makusha	40.54	
	1	Czech Republic	Zdeněk Stromšík, Jiří Polák, Jan Jirka, Jan Veleba	DNF	
	3	Portugal	André Prazeres, Diogo Antunes, Frederico Curvelo, Delvis Santos	DQ	

=== Final ===
Rank	Nation	Athletes	Time	Notes
1st place, gold medalist(s)	Italy	Fausto Desalu, Marcell Jacobs, Davide Manenti, Filippo Tortu	39.21	
2nd place, silver medalist(s)	Japan	Ryuichiro Sakai, Ryota Suzuki, Daisuke Miyamoto, Hiroki Yanagita	39.42	
3rd place, bronze medalist(s)	Denmark	Simon Hansen, Tazana Kamanga-Dyrbak, Kojo Musah, Frederik Schou-Nielsen	39.56	
	Netherlands	Joris van Gool, Taymir Burnet, Hensley Paulina, Chris Garia	DNF	
	Germany	Michael Pohl, Joshua Hartmann, Roy Schmidt, Marvin Schulte	DNF	
	Brazil	Rodrigo do Nascimento, Felipe dos Santos, Derick Silva, Paulo André de Oliveira	DQ	R17.3.1
	Ghana	Sean Safo-Antwi, Benjamin Azamati-Kwaku, Joseph Oduro Manu, Joseph Paul Amoah	DQ	R24.7
	South Africa	Thando Dlodlo, Gift Leotlela, Clarence Munyai, Akani Simbine	DQ	Doping offence
