= 2019 IAAF World Relays – Men's 4 × 100 metres relay =

Men's 4 × 100 metres relay at the 2019 IAAF World Relays
- Venue: Nissan Stadium
- Dates: 11 May (heats) & 12 May (final)
- Nations: 25
- Winning time: 38.05

Medalists
gold medal	Rodrigo do Nascimento; Jorge Vides; Derick Silva; Paulo André de Oliveira	Brazil
silver medal	Mike Rodgers; Justin Gatlin; Isiah Young; Noah Lyles; Cameron Burrell*	United States
bronze medal	Chijindu Ujah; Harry Aikines-Aryeetey; Adam Gemili; Nethaneel Mitchell-Blake	Great Britain

The men's 4 × 100 metres relay at the 2019 IAAF World Relays was held at the Nissan Stadium on 11 and 12 May.

== Records ==
Prior to the competition, the records were as follows:

World record	Jamaica (Nesta Carter, Michael Frater, Yohan Blake, Usain Bolt)	36.84	(United Kingdom) London, Great Britain	11 August 2012
Championship record	United States (Mike Rodgers, Justin Gatlin, Tyson Gay, Ryan Bailey)	37.38	(The Bahamas) Nassau, Bahamas	2 May 2015
World Leading	Canada	38.34	Gainesville, United States	30 March 2019

== Results ==
KEY:	Q	Qualified	q	Fastest non-qualifiers	WL	World leading	CR	Championship record	NR	National record	SB	Seasonal best	WC	2019 World Championships qualification

=== Heats ===
Qualification: First 2 of each heat (Q) plus the 2 fastest times (q) advanced to the final.

Rank	Heat	Nation	Athletes	Time	Notes
1	1	Great Britain	Chijindu Ujah, Harry Aikines-Aryeetey, Adam Gemili, Nethaneel Mitchell-Blake	38.11	Q, WL, *WC
2	1	Brazil	Rodrigo do Nascimento, Jorge Vides, Derick Silva, Paulo André de Oliveira	38.22	Q, SB, *WC
3	2	Italy	Eseosa Desalu, Marcell Jacobs, Davide Manenti, Filippo Tortu	38.29	Q, SB, *WC
4	3	United States	Mike Rodgers, Justin Gatlin, Isiah Young, Cameron Burrell	38.34	Q, SB, *WC
5	2	China	Wu Zhiqiang, Xie Zhenye, Su Bingtian, Liang Jinsheng	38.46	Q, SB, *WC
6	2	Turkey	Emre Zafer Barnes, Jak Ali Harvey, İzzet Safer, Ramil Guliyev	38.47	q, SB, *WC
7	3	France	Mouhamadou Fall, Jimmy Vicaut, Mickaël-Meba Zézé, Stuart Dutamby	38.51	Q, SB, *WC
8	1	Jamaica	Nesta Carter, Julian Forte, Rasheed Dwyer, Tyquendo Tracey	38.51	q, SB, *WC
9	1	South Africa	Emile Erasmus, Simon Magakwe, Anaso Jobodwana, Akani Simbine	38.66	SB, *WC
10	2	Netherlands	Christopher Garia, Churandy Martina, Hensley Paulina, Taymir Burnet	38.67	SB, *WC
11	3	Canada	Gavin Smellie, Aaron Brown, Brendon Rodney, Andre De Grasse	38.76	SB
12	2	Czech Republic	Zdeněk Stromšík, Jan Veleba, Jan Jirka, Dominik Záleský	38.77	NR
13	2	Thailand	Ruttanapon Sowan, Nutthapong Veeravongratanas, Jirapong Meenapra, Siripol Punpa	38.82	
14	2	Ukraine	Oleksandr Sokolov, Emil Ibrahimov, Volodymyr Suprun, Serhiy Smelyk	38.84	SB
15	3	Chinese Taipei	Wei Tai-sheng, Wang Wei-hsu, Yang Chun-han, Cheng Po-yu	38.89	SB
16	1	Germany	Kevin Kranz, Patrick Domogala, Julian Reus, Robin Erewa	38.91	SB
17	1	Australia	Trae Williams, Alex Hartmann, Zach Holdsworth, Jake Doran	39.05	
18	3	Dominican Republic	Christopher Valdez, Yohandris Andújar, Mayovanex de Óleo, Yancarlos Martínez	39.12	
19	1	Indonesia	Mochammad Bisma Diwa Abina, Lalu Muhammad Zohri, Eko Rimbawan, Bayu Kertanegara	39.39	SB
20	3	Finland	Otto Ahlfors, Ville Myllymäki, Oskari Lehtonen, Samuel Purola	39.59	SB
21	1	Venezuela	Alberto Aguilar, Rafael Vázquez, Alexis Nieves, Abdel Kalil	39.76	SB
	1	Poland	Remigiusz Olszewski, Przemysław Słowikowski, Karol Kwiatkowski, Dominik Kopeć	DNF	
	2	Zimbabwe	Dicksson Kamungeremu, Tatenda Tsumba, Itayi Vambe, Ngoni Makusha	DQ	R163.3(b)
	3	Japan	Shuhei Tada, Ryota Yamagata, Yuki Koike, Yoshihide Kiryu	DQ	170.6(a)
	3	Nigeria	Enoch Adegoke, Emmanuel Arowolo, Ogho-Oghene Egwero, Usheoritse Itsekiri	DQ	170.6(a)

=== Final ===
Rank	Lane	Nation	Athletes	Time	Notes	Points
1st place, gold medalist(s)	7	Brazil	Rodrigo do Nascimento, Jorge Vides, Derick Silva, Paulo André de Oliveira	38.05	WL	8
2nd place, silver medalist(s)	5	United States	Mike Rodgers, Justin Gatlin, Isiah Young, Noah Lyles	38.07	SB	7
3rd place, bronze medalist(s)	4	Great Britain	Chijindu Ujah, Harry Aikines-Aryeetey, Adam Gemili, Nethaneel Mitchell-Blake	38.15		6
4	8	China	Wu Zhiqiang, Xie Zhenye, Su Bingtian, Liang Jinsheng	38.16	SB	5
5	9	France	Stuart Dutamby, Jimmy Vicaut, Mickaël-Meba Zézé, Mouhamadou Fall	38.31	SB	4
6	3	Jamaica	Nesta Carter, Julian Forte, Rasheed Dwyer, Nigel Ellis	38.88		3
7	2	Turkey	Emre Zafer Barnes, Jak Ali Harvey, Izzet Safer, Ramil Guliyev	39.13		2
	6	Italy	Eseosa Desalu, Lamont Marcell Jacobs, Davide Manenti, Filippo Tortu	DNF		0
