= 2017 IAAF World Relays – Men's 4 × 100 metres relay =

Men's 4 × 100 metres relay at the 2017 IAAF World Relays
- Venue: Thomas Robinson Stadium
- Dates: 22 April (heats & final)
- Competitors: 93 from 21 nations
- Winning time: 38.43

Medalists
gold medal	Leshon Collins; Mike Rodgers; Ronnie Baker; Justin Gatlin; Marvin Bracy*	United States
silver medal	Mario Burke; Ramon Gittens; Nicholas Deshong; Burkheart Ellis	Barbados
bronze medal	Tang Xingqiang; Xie Zhenye; Su Bingtian; Liang Jinsheng; Mo Youxue*; Zhang Peimeng*	China

The men's 4 × 100 metres relay at the 2017 IAAF World Relays was held at the Thomas Robinson Stadium on 2 May.

From the gun in the final, American Leshon Collins got some separation from Canada's Akeem Haynes. Also gaining an advantage on the stagger was Chijindu Ujah, the British leadoff as the gap to China's Tang Xingqiang and Barbados' Mario Burke shrank. Down the backstretch, Britain's Zharnel Hughes and American Mike Rodgers didn't gain against China's Xie Zhenye, who gained a step on Ramon Gittens to his outside. The second Canadian exchange between Aaron Brown and Brendon Rodney was an adventure, with Rodney hopping up and down leaving the zone without the baton. Through the second turn, American Ronnie Baker gained a little on Britain's Daniel Talbot and China's sub-10 star, Su Bingtian to take a slight lead into the final handoff. Britain's Ojie Edoburun reached back for the baton first but came up empty handed. The American handoff was more awkward as Justin Gatlin slowed and grabbed twice to finally get the baton in hand. China's final exchange was also awkward as Su ran up on Liang Jinsheng, finally getting a successful handoff but behind a step, as USA came out with the baton in first. With the advantage, the Olympic silver medalist sped away to a huge victory. Farther behind, Netherlands also failed to get the handoff between Solomon Bockarie and Hensley Paulina. Two steps behind China, Barbados made a clean exchange between Nicholas Deshong and Burkheart Ellis. As expected, Liang was losing ground to Gatlin, behind him, reminiscent of Bob Hayes in Tokyo, a gangly running Ellis was gaining on every step, Barbados overtaking China a step out, accentuated by a dip finish.

== Records ==
Prior to the competition, the records were as follows:

World record	Jamaica (Nesta Carter, Michael Frater, Yohan Blake, Usain Bolt)	36.84	(United Kingdom) London, Great Britain	11 August 2012
Championship record	United States (Mike Rodgers; Justin Gatlin; Tyson Gay; Ryan Bailey; United States)	37.38	(The Bahamas) Nassau, Bahamas	2 May 2015
World Leading	Canada	38.15	Gainesville, United States	1 April 2017
African Record	Nigeria (Osmond Ezinwa, Olapade Adeniken, Francis Obikwelu, Davidson Ezinwa)	37.94	Athens, Greece	9 August 1997
Asian Record	Japan (Ryota Yamagata, Shōta Iizuka, Yoshihide Kiryu, Aska Cambridge)	37.60	Rio de Janeiro, Brazil	19 August 2016
North, Central American and Caribbean record	Jamaica (Nesta Carter, Michael Frater, Yohan Blake, Usain Bolt)	36.84	(United Kingdom) London, Great Britain	11 August 2012
South American Record	Brazil (Vicente de Lima, Édson Ribeiro, André da Silva, Claudinei da Silva)	37.90	Sydney, Australia	30 September 2000
European Record	Great Britain (Jason Gardener, Darren Campbell, Marlon Devonish, Dwain Chambers)	37.73	Seville, Spain	29 August 1999
Oceanian record	Australia (Paul Henderson, Tim Jackson, Steve Brimacombe, Damien Marsh)	38.17	Gothenburg, Sweden	12 August 1995
Oceanian record	Australia (Anthony Alozie, Isaac Ntiamoah, Andrew McCabe, Josh Ross)	38.17	(United Kingdom) London, Great Britain	10 August 2012

== Schedule ==
Date	Time	Round
22 April 2017	19:59	Heats
22 April 2017	22:12	Final B
22 April 2017	22:36	Final

All times are local times (UTC-4)

== Results ==
KEY:	Q	Qualified	q	Fastest non-qualifiers	WL	World leading	CR	Championship record	NR	National record	SB	Seasonal best	WC	2017 World Championships qualification

=== Heats ===
Qualification: First 2 of each heat (Q) plus the 2 fastest times (q) advanced to the final. The next 8 fastest times qualified for the final B.

Rank	Heat	Nation	Athletes	Time	Notes
1	2	Canada	Akeem Haynes, Aaron Brown, Brendon Rodney, Andre De Grasse	38.21	Q
2	2	United States	Marvin Bracy, Mike Rodgers, Ronnie Baker, Justin Gatlin	38.22	Q
3	3	Great Britain	Chijindu Ujah, Zharnel Hughes, Adam Gemili, Daniel Talbot	38.32	Q, SB
4	1	Netherlands	Giovanni Codrington, Churandy Martina, Solomon Bockarie, Hensley Paulina	38.71	Q, SB
5	1	China	Mo Youxue, Xie Zhenye, Su Bingtian, Zhang Peimeng	38.97	Q, SB
6	1	Australia	Trae Williams, Tom Gamble, Alexander Hartmann, Nicholas Andrews	39.09	q, SB
7	2	France	Marvin René, Stuart Dutamby, Mickael-Meba Zeze, Jimmy Vicaut	39.10	q, SB
8	2	Germany	Julian Reus, Robin Erewa, Alexander Kosenkow, Sven Knipphals	39.11	SB
9	3	Barbados	Mario Burke, Ramon Gittens, Nicholas Deshong, Burkheart Ellis Jr	39.26	Q, SB
10	1	Bahamas	Warren Fraser, Shavez Hart, Cliff Resias, Adrian Griffith	39.36	SB
11	1	Trinidad and Tobago	Keston Bledman, Kyle Greaux, Emmanuel Callender, Dan-Neil Telesford	39.44	SB
12	3	Japan	Takumi Masuda, Yuma Saito, Jun Yamashita, Kenta Oshima	39.52	SB
13	3	Dominican Republic	Christopher Valdez, Yohandris Andújar, Mayobanex de Óleo, Juan Aroldi Santos	39.56	SB
14	3	Cuba	Harlyn Pérez, Yordan O'Farrill, Yoan Medina, Reynier Mena	39.67	SB
15	2	Mexico	Héctor Ruiz, Iván Moreno, Juan Carlos Alanis, César Ramírez	39.71	SB
16	3	Saint Kitts and Nevis	Hakeem Huggins, Lestrod Roland, Allistar Clarke, Brijesh Lawrence	39.81	SB
17	2	Poland	Dominik Kopeć, Przemysław Słowikowski, Artur Zaczek, Grzegorz Zimniewicz	39.84	SB
	2	Italy	Fabio Cerutti, Eseosa Desalu, Federico Cattaneo, Filippo Tortu	DQ	R170.7
	3	Brazil	António Cesar Rodrigues, Bruno de Barros, Derick Silva, Vítor Hugo dos Santos	DQ	R163.3(A)
	1	Antigua and Barbuda	Chavaughn Walsh, Daniel Bailey, Jared Jarvis, Tahir Walsh	DNF	
	1	Jamaica	Everton Clarke, Kemar Bailey-Cole, Jevaughn Minzie, Yohan Blake	DNF	

=== Final B ===
Rank	Lane	Nation	Athletes	Time	Notes
1	5	Trinidad and Tobago	Moriba Morain, Emmanuel Callender, Kyle Greaux, Dan-Neil Telesford	39.04	SB, *WC
2	3	Germany	Roy Schmidt, Robin Erewa, Julian Reus, Aleixo-Platini Menga	39.15	*WC
3	4	Bahamas	Warren Fraser, Shavez Hart, Cliff Resias, Adrian Griffith	39.18	SB, *WC
4	7	Dominican Republic	Christopher Valdez, Yohandris Andújar, Carlos Jorge, Juan Aroldi Santos	39.57	
5	8	Cuba	Harlyn Pérez, Yordan O'Farrill, Yoan Medina, Reynier Mena	39.90	
6	2	Mexico	Héctor Ruiz, Iván Moreno, Juan Carlos Alanis, César Ramírez	39.98	
7	6	Japan	Takumi Masuda, Yuma Saito, Jun Yamashita, Takeshi Fujiwara	40.31	
8	1	Saint Kitts and Nevis	Hakeem Huggins, Lestrod Roland, Allistar Clarke, Brijesh Lawrence	41.07	

=== Final ===
Rank	Lane	Nation	Athletes	Time	Notes
1st place, gold medalist(s)	5	United States	Leshon Collins, Mike Rodgers, Ronnie Baker, Justin Gatlin	38.43	*WC
2nd place, silver medalist(s)	8	Barbados	Mario Burke, Ramon Gittens, Nicholas Deshong, Burkheart Ellis Jr	39.18	SB, *WC
3rd place, bronze medalist(s)	7	China	Tang Xingqiang, Xie Zhenye, Su Bingtian, Liang Jinsheng	39.22	*WC
4	2	Australia	Trae Williams, Tom Gamble, Alexander Hartmann, Nicholas Andrews	39.73	*WC
5	1	France	Marvin René, Jimmy Vicaut, Mickael-Meba Zeze, Stuart Dutamby	39.83	*WC
	4	Canada	Akeem Haynes, Aaron Brown, Brendon Rodney, Andre De Grasse	DNF	
	3	Netherlands	Giovanni Codrington, Churandy Martina, Solomon Bockarie, Hensley Paulina	DNF	
	6	United Kingdom	Chijindu Ujah, Zharnel Hughes, Daniel Talbot, Ojie Edoburun	DNF	
