= 2018 European Athletics Championships – Men's 100 metres =

Men's 100 metres at the 2018 European Athletics Championships
- Venue: Olympic Stadium
- Location: Berlin
- Dates: August 6 (round 1); August 7 (semifinals & final)
- Competitors: 48 from 20 nations
- Winning time: 9.95

Medalists
gold medal	Zharnel Hughes	Great Britain
silver medal	Reece Prescod	Great Britain
bronze medal	Jak Ali Harvey	Turkey

The men's 100 metres at the 2018 European Athletics Championships took place at the Olympic Stadium on 6 and 7 August. Churandy Martina of the Netherlands was the defending champion, Jak Ali Harvey of Turkey was the defending silver medalist, and Jimmy Vicaut of France was the defending bronze medalist.

== Records ==
Standing records prior to the 2018 European Athletics Championships
World record	Usain Bolt (JAM)	9.58	Berlin, Germany	16 August 2009
European record	Francis Obikwelu (POR)	9.86	Athens, Greece	22 August 2004
Championship record	Francis Obikwelu (POR)	9.99	Gothenburg, Sweden	8 August 2006
World Leading	Noah Lyles (USA)	9.88	Des Moines, Iowa, United States	22 June 2018
European Leading	Zharnel Hughes (GBR)	9.91	Kingston, Jamaica	9 June 2018
Broken records during the 2018 European Athletics Championships
Championship record	Jimmy Vicaut (FRA)	9.97	Berlin, Germany	7 August 2018
Championship record	Zharnel Hughes (GBR)	9.95	Berlin, Germany	7 August 2018

== Schedule ==
Date	Time	Round
6 August 2018	18:30	Round 1
7 August 2018	21:30	Semifinals
7 August 2018	23:50	Final

All times are local times (UTC+2)

== Competition format ==
The top eight ranked athletes by time during the season who entered the championships were given a BYE into the Semi-Finals. The first round was held on Monday, August 6. The Semi-Finals were held the day after, and the Final just over two hours after that.

== Results ==
=== Round 1 ===
First 2 in each heat (Q) and the next fastest 5 (q) advance to the Semifinals. 7 fastest entrants awarded bye to Semifinals.

Wind:
Heat 1: -0.2 m/s, Heat 2: +0.1 m/s, Heat 3: +0.2 m/s, Heat 4: -0.3 m/s, Heat 5: +0.4 m/s

Rank	Heat	Lane	Name	Nationality	Time	Note
1	1	2	Churandy Martina	Netherlands	10.24	Q
2	5	4	Silvan Wicki	Switzerland	10.28	Q
3	3	1	Alex Wilson	Switzerland	10.32	Q
4	1	8	Ján Volko	Slovakia	10.32	Q
5	2	5	Yazaldes Nascimento	Portugal	10.33	Q
6	5	8	Carlos Nascimento	Portugal	10.33	Q
7	5	6	Hensley Paulina	Netherlands	10.34	q
8	3	3	Christopher Garia	Netherlands	10.35	Q
9	4	7	Jonathan Quarcoo	Norway	10.37	Q
10	1	6	Dominik Kopeć	Poland	10.37	q
11	2	6	Julian Reus	Germany	10.37	Q
12	3	4	José Lopes	Portugal	10.38	q
13	5	7	Federico Cattaneo	Italy	10.39	q
14	3	8	Zdeněk Stromšík	Czech Republic	10.39	q
15	5	2	Yiğitcan Hekimoğlu	Turkey	10.40	
16	3	6	Kevin Kranz	Germany	10.41	
17	4	4	Lucas Jakubczyk	Germany	10.41	Q
18	5	5	Oleksandr Sokolov	Ukraine	10.43	
19	2	8	Ioánnis Nifadópoulos	Greece	10.44	
19	3	7	Remigiusz Olszewski	Poland	10.44	
21	1	4	Denis Dimitrov	Bulgaria	10.45	
22	4	6	Marvin René	France	10.47	
23	4	8	Dennis Leal	Sweden	10.51	
24	2	1	Aitor Same Ekobo	Spain	10.51	
25	2	7	Jan Veleba	Czech Republic	10.52	
26	4	5	Joris van Gool	Netherlands	10.52	
27	3	2	Šimon Bujna	Slovakia	10.53	
28	2	2	Przemysław Słowikowski	Poland	10.54	
29	4	1	Patrick Chinedu Ike	Spain	10.54	
30	1	7	Ángel David Rodríguez	Spain	10.55	
31	4	3	Dominik Záleský	Czech Republic	10.55	
32	4	2	Ionuț Andrei Neagoe	Romania	10.56	
33	2	3	Florian Clivaz	Switzerland	10.57	
34	1	1	Markus Fuchs	Austria	10.57	
35	2	4	Henrik Larsson	Sweden	10.62	
36	5	3	Dániel Szabó	Hungary	10.64	
37	1	5	Erik Hagberg	Sweden	10.69	
38	3	5	Petar Peev	Bulgaria	10.75	
39	1	3	Ioan Andrei Melnicescu	Romania	10.88	

=== Semifinals ===
First 2 (Q) and next 2 fastest (q) qualify for the final.

Wind:
Heat 1: +0.4 m/s, Heat 2: +0.6 m/s, Heat 3: +0.2 m/s

Rank	Heat	Lane	Name	Nationality	Time	Note
1	1	4	Jimmy Vicaut*	France	9.97	Q, CR
2	2	5	Zharnel Hughes*	Great Britain	10.01	Q
3	2	3	Jak Ali Harvey*	Turkey	10.09	Q
4	1	6	Reece Prescod*	Great Britain	10.10	Q
5	3	4	Filippo Tortu*	Italy	10.12	Q
6	3	5	Chijindu Ujah*	Great Britain	10.14	Q
7	1	8	Churandy Martina	Netherlands	10.18	q, SB
8	1	5	Emre Zafer Barnes*	Turkey	10.21	q
9	2	2	Yazaldes Nascimento	Portugal	10.22	SB
10	3	3	Alex Wilson	Switzerland	10.22	SB
11	2	4	Marcell Jacobs*	Italy	10.28	
12	1	1	Dominik Kopeć	Poland	10.29	
13	2	6	Ján Volko	Slovakia	10.31	
14	1	3	Carlos Nascimento	Portugal	10.31	
15	3	1	Christopher Garia	Netherlands	10.31	
16	2	8	Lucas Jakubczyk	Germany	10.32	
17	2	7	Zdeněk Stromšík	Czech Republic	10.37	
18	3	7	Julian Reus	Germany	10.37	
19	2	1	Hensley Paulina	Netherlands	10.38	
20	1	2	Federico Cattaneo	Italy	10.39	
21	3	2	José Lopes	Portugal	10.40	
22	3	8	Jonathan Quarcoo	Norway	10.45	
23	1	7	Silvan Wicki	Switzerland	10.49	
24	3	6	Amaury Golitin*	France	10.55	

*Athletes who received a bye to the semifinals

=== Final ===
Wind: 0.0 m/s

Rank	Lane	Name	Nationality	Time	Note
1st place, gold medalist(s)	5	Zharnel Hughes	Great Britain	9.95	CR
2nd place, silver medalist(s)	7	Reece Prescod	Great Britain	9.96	=NU23R
3rd place, bronze medalist(s)	3	Jak Ali Harvey	Turkey	10.01	
4	8	Chijindu Ujah	Great Britain	10.06	SB
5	6	Filippo Tortu	Italy	10.08	
6	2	Churandy Martina	Netherlands	10.16	SB
7	1	Emre Zafer Barnes	Turkey	10.29	
	4	Jimmy Vicaut	France	DNS	
