= 2015 European Athletics U23 Championships – Men's 200 metres =

The men's 200 metres event at the 2015 European Athletics U23 Championships was held in Tallinn, Estonia, at Kadriorg Stadium on 10 and 11 July.

== Medalists ==
Gold	Karol Zalewski; Poland
Silver	Leon Reid; United Kingdom
Bronze	Jan Jirka; Czech Republic

== Results ==
=== Final ===
11 July
Wind: 1.1 m/s

Rank	Name	Nationality	Reaction Time	Time	Notes
1st place, gold medalist(s)	Karol Zalewski	Poland	0.147	20.49	
2nd place, silver medalist(s)	Leon Reid	United Kingdom	0.137	20.63	
3rd place, bronze medalist(s)	Jan Jirka	Czech Republic	0.172	20.82	
4	Bastien Mouthon	Switzerland	0.128	20.83	
5	Stuart Dutamby	France	0.183	20.89	
6	Samuli Samuelsson	Finland	0.162	20.90	
7	Marcus Lawler	Ireland	0.133	20.94	
8	Giacomo Tortu	Italy	0.169	21.12	

=== Semifinals ===
11 July

==== Semifinal 1 ====
Wind: 0.0 m/s

Rank	Name	Nationality	Reaction Time	Time	Notes
1	Karol Zalewski	Poland	0.154	20.50	Q
2	Marcus Lawler	Ireland	0.158	20.91	Q
3	Samuli Samuelsson	Finland	0.139	20.96	Q
4	Stuart Dutamby	France	0.174	20.97	q
5	Giacomo Tortu	Italy	0.177	21.08	q
6	Aleksandr Yefimov	Russia	0.171	21.34	
7	Even Pettersen	Norway	0.146	22.99	

==== Semifinal 2 ====
Wind: 0.1 m/s

Rank	Name	Nationality	Reaction Time	Time	Notes
1	Leon Reid	United Kingdom	0.142	20.65	Q
2	Jan Jirka	Czech Republic	0.173	20.96	Q
3	Bastien Mouthon	Switzerland	0.172	20.98	Q
4	Denis Ogarkov	Russia	0.137	21.23	
5	Volodymyr Suprun	Ukraine	0.158	21.40	
6	Marvin René	France	0.166	21.44	
7	Roope Saarinen	Finland	0.170	21.46	

=== Heats ===
10 July

==== Heat 1 ====
Wind: 1.2 m/s

Rank	Name	Nationality	Reaction Time	Time	Notes
1	Karol Zalewski	Poland	0.141	20.46	Q
2	Stuart Dutamby	France	0.170	20.84	SB Q
3	Samuli Samuelsson	Finland	0.151	20.89	PB Q
4	Giacomo Tortu	Italy	0.188	21.05	PB q
5	Volodymyr Suprun	Ukraine	0.156	21.17	q
6	Even Pettersen	Norway	0.136	21.21	PB q
7	Bálint Móricz	Hungary	0.196	21.40	

==== Heat 2 ====
Wind: -0.9 m/s

Rank	Name	Nationality	Reaction Time	Time	Notes
1	Leon Reid	United Kingdom	0.138	20.78	Q
2	Guy-Elphège Anouman	France	0.163	21.20	Q
3	Aleksandr Yefimov	Russia	0.153	21.29	Q
4	Morten Madsen	Denmark	0.143	21.37	
5	Imri Persiado	Israel	0.158	21.46	
6	Kolbeinn Hödur Gunnarsson	Iceland	0.167	21.48	SB
	Alexandru Terpezan	Romania	0.148	DQ	

==== Heat 3 ====
Wind: 0.5 m/s

Rank	Name	Nationality	Reaction Time	Time	Notes
1	Marcus Lawler	Ireland	0.145	20.94	Q
2	Hensley Paulina	Netherlands	0.144	21.17	Q
3	Roope Saarinen	Finland	0.192	21.19	PB Q
4	Denis Ogarkov	Russia	0.146	21.20	q
5	Simone Pettenati	Italy	0.153	21.49	
6	Michal Tlustý	Czech Republic	0.158	21.57	
7	Markus Fuchs	Austria	0.146	21.99	

==== Heat 4 ====
Wind: 1.7 m/s

Rank	Name	Nationality	Reaction Time	Time	Notes
1	Jan Jirka	Czech Republic	0.174	20.78	PB Q
2	Bastien Mouthon	Switzerland	0.139	20.99	Q
3	Marvin René	France	0.156	21.22	Q
4	Illia Siratsiuk	Belarus	0.158	21.22	
5	Lodovico Cortelazzo	Italy	0.145	21.24	
6	Jani Koskela	Finland	0.157	21.44	
7	Ricardo Ribeiro	Portugal	0.190	21.65	

== Participation ==
According to an unofficial count, 28 athletes from 20 countries participated in the event.

- Austria (1)
- Belarus (1)
- Czech Republic (2)
- Denmark (1)
- Finland (3)
- France (3)
- Hungary (1)
- Iceland (1)
- Ireland (1)
- Israel (1)
- Italy (3)
- Netherlands (1)
- Norway (1)
- Poland (1)
- Portugal (1)
- Romania (1)
- Russia (2)
- Switzerland (1)
- Ukraine (1)
- United Kingdom (1)
