= 2019 World Athletics Championships – Men's 4 × 100 metres relay =

Men's 4 × 100 metres relay at the 2019 World Championships
- Venue: Khalifa International Stadium
- Dates: 4 October (heats); 5 October (final)
- Competitors: 68 from 15 nations
- Teams: 15
- Winning time: 37.10

Medalists
| gold medal | Christian Coleman; Justin Gatlin; Mike Rodgers; Noah Lyles; Cravon Gillespie* | United States |
| silver medal | Adam Gemili; Zharnel Hughes; Richard Kilty; Nethaneel Mitchell-Blake | Great Britain |
| bronze medal | Shuhei Tada; Kirara Shiraishi; Yoshihide Kiryū; Abdul Hakim Sani Brown; Yuki Koike* | Japan |

Video on YouTube Official Video

The men's 4 × 100 metres relay at the 2019 World Athletics Championships was held at the Khalifa International Stadium in Doha, Qatar, from 4 to 5 October 2019.

== Summary ==
=== Background ===
Defending champion Great Britain was back with two members of their winning team, taking the qualifying heats with a world leading time. South Africa set the African continental record as they qualified winning the other heat. In a familiar situation, despite having the gold and silver medalists on their team, USA struggled with their handoff, completing their handoff at the end of the third zone and missing disqualification by inches or a favorable judge's decision. USA was the slowest qualifier into the final, just .08 ahead of Italy setting their national record in the adjacent lane. Because of the poor qualification position, USA drew lane 8. Instead of a substitute anchor runner, they went with their "A" team, putting in 200 meter champion Noah Lyles. Lyles spent the 2019 season coming back after slow starts, essentially demonstrating his superior top end speed. In a relay with a rolling start, his slow starts are negated. USA put the fastest starter, now the fastest man in the world, Christian Coleman in the blocks running against GBR's fastest turn runner Adam Gemili.

=== Race ===
Coleman did his part, gaining rapidly on China's best starter Su Bingtian to his outside. With a smooth handoff, as Justin Gatlin took his first step, he was ahead of China meaning USA would have no traffic interference for the rest of the race. One lane inside of Coleman, Gemili also did his job, keeping GBR close. Shuhei Tada for Japan also gained on World Relays champion Brazil.

On the second leg, Gatlin separated from Xu Zhouzheng and Zharnel Hughes also lost a little to the Olympic champion, but USA was right where GBR could watch them. Mike Rodgers had to hesitate to get the baton from Gatlin, but with USA's history, there was no disaster. GBR's handoff was also hesitant, with Richard Kilty having to decelerate to not run out of the handoff zone, but Japan passed quickly to former junior world record holder Yoshihide Kiryū to keep them close. Through the turn, Rodgers separated from Kilty, Kiryū also gained with Japan passing in second place and South Africa was pulling close to Brazil to create a traffic jam. USA handed off cleanly to Lyles, as if they had practiced the handoff in advance. Japan handed off to their national record holder Abdul Hakim Sani Brown, GBR handed off to Nethaneel Mitchell-Blake, South Africa gave it to #6 on the season Akani Simbine and Brazil had Paulo André de Oliveira. And they were off to the races.

With a metre and a half advantage, Lyles expanded it to three metres by the finish. Lyles crossed the line holding the baton in the air in victory. Mitchell-Blake gained slightly to battle Brown for the medals, taking silver by a half a metre. Behind them de Oliveira came back on Simbine to nip South Africa at the line.

USA's 37.10 tied Jamaica's rescinded Usain Bolt/Asafa Powell powered 2008 Olympic team for the third fastest ever and the American record. Great Britain's 37.36 tied two more Bolt led Jamaican World Championship teams from 2013 and 2015 for the sixth best ever and the European record. Japan's 37.43 moved them into #14 in history, #4 as a country and the Asian record. And Brazil moved to become the #8 country, just behind South Africa's now #7 place from their faster race the trials and set the South American record improving on the one they tied in the trials. In all four continental records and nine national records among the 16 team event.

== Records ==
Before the competition records were as follows:

| Record | Perf. | Team | Date | Location |
|---|---|---|---|---|
| World | 36.84 | Jamaica; Nesta Carter, Michael Frater, Yohan Blake, Usain Bolt | 11 Aug 2012 | London, United Kingdom |
| Championship | 37.04 | Jamaica; Nesta Carter, Michael Frater, Yohan Blake, Usain Bolt | 4 Sep 2011 | Daegu, South Korea |
| World leading | 37.60 | Great Britain; Chijindu Ujah, Zharnel Hughes, Richard Kilty, Nethaneel Mitchell-Blake | 21 Jul 2019 | London, United Kingdom |
| African | 37.94 | Nigeria; Osmond Ezinwa, Olapade Adeniken, Francis Obikwelu, Davidson Ezinwa | 9 Aug 1997 | Athens, Greece |
| Asian | 37.60 | Japan; Ryota Yamagata, Shota Iizuka, Yoshihide Kiryu, Asuka Cambridge | 19 Aug 2016 | Rio de Janeiro, Brazil |
| NACAC | 36.84 | Jamaica; Nesta Carter, Michael Frater, Yohan Blake, Usain Bolt | 11 Aug 2012 | London, United Kingdom |
| South American | 37.90 | Brazil; Vicente de Lima, Édson Ribeiro, André da Silva, Claudinei da Silva | 30 Sep 2000 | Sydney, Australia |
| European | 37.47 | Great Britain; Chijindu Ujah, Adam Gemili, Daniel Talbot, Nethaneel Mitchell-Blake | 12 Aug 2017 | London, United Kingdom |
| Oceanian | 38.17 | Australia; Paul Henderson, Tim Jackson, Steve Brimacombe, Damien Marsh | 12 Aug 1995 | Gothenburg, Sweden |
| Oceanian | 38.17 | Australia; Anthony Alozie, Isaac Ntiamoah, Andrew McCabe (sprinter), Josh Ross | 10 Aug 2012 | London, United Kingdom |

The following records were matched or set at the competition:

| Record | Perf. | Team | Date |
|---|---|---|---|
| World leading | 37.56 | Great Britain; Adam Gemili, Zharnel Hughes, Richard Kilty, Nethaneel Mitchell-Blake | 4 Oct 2019 |
| African | 37.65 | South Africa; Thando Dlodlo, Simon Magakwe, Clarence Munyai, Akani Simbine | 4 Oct 2019 |
| South African | 37.65 | South Africa; Thando Dlodlo, Simon Magakwe, Clarence Munyai, Akani Simbine | 4 Oct 2019 |
| Chinese | 37.79 | China; Su Bingtian, Xu Zhouzheng, Wu Zhiqiang, Xie Zhenye | 4 Oct 2019 |
| South American | 37.90 | Brazil; Rodrigo do Nascimento, Vitor Hugo dos Santos, Derick Silva, Paulo André de Oliveira | 4 Oct 2019 |
| Brazilian | 37.90 | Brazil; Rodrigo do Nascimento, Vitor Hugo dos Santos, Derick Silva, Paulo André de Oliveira | 4 Oct 2019 |
| Dutch | 37.91 | Netherlands; Joris van Gool, Taymir Burnet, Hensley Paulina, Churandy Martina | 4 Oct 2019 |
| Italian | 38.11 | Italy; Federico Cattaneo, Marcell Jacobs, Davide Manenti, Filippo Tortu | 4 Oct 2019 |
| World leading | 37.10 | United States; Christian Coleman, Justin Gatlin, Mike Rodgers, Noah Lyles | 5 Oct 2019 |
| United States | 37.10 | United States; Christian Coleman, Justin Gatlin, Mike Rodgers, Noah Lyles | 5 Oct 2019 |
| European | 37.36 | Great Britain; Adam Gemili, Zharnel Hughes, Richard Kilty, Nethaneel Mitchell-Blake | 5 Oct 2019 |
| British | 37.36 | Great Britain; Adam Gemili, Zharnel Hughes, Richard Kilty, Nethaneel Mitchell-Blake | 5 Oct 2019 |
| Asian | 37.43 | Japan; Shuhei Tada, Kirara Shiraishi, Yoshihide Kiryū, Abdul Hakim Sani Brown | 5 Oct 2019 |
| Japanese | 37.43 | Japan; Shuhei Tada, Kirara Shiraishi, Yoshihide Kiryū, Abdul Hakim Sani Brown | 5 Oct 2019 |
| South American | 37.72 | Brazil; Rodrigo do Nascimento, Vitor Hugo dos Santos, Derick Silva, Paulo André de Oliveira | 5 Oct 2019 |
| Brazilian | 37.72 | Brazil; Rodrigo do Nascimento, Vitor Hugo dos Santos, Derick Silva, Paulo André de Oliveira | 5 Oct 2019 |

== Schedule ==
The event schedule, in local time (UTC+3), was as follows:

| Date | Time | Round |
|---|---|---|
| 4 October | 21:05 | Heats |
| 5 October | 22:15 | Final |

== Results ==
=== Heats ===
The first three in each heat (Q) and the next two fastest (q) qualified for the final.

| Rank | Heat | Lane | Nation | Athletes | Time | Notes |
|---|---|---|---|---|---|---|
| 1 | 1 | 6 | Great Britain & N.I. | Adam Gemili, Zharnel Hughes, Richard Kilty, Nethaneel Mitchell-Blake | 37.56 | Q, WL |
| 2 | 2 | 4 | South Africa | Thando Dlodlo, Simon Magakwe, Clarence Munyai, Akani Simbine | 37.65 | Q, AR |
| 3 | 2 | 5 | Japan | Yuki Koike, Kirara Shiraishi, Yoshihide Kiryū, Abdul Hakim Sani Brown | 37.78 | Q, SB |
| 4 | 2 | 9 | China | Su Bingtian, Xu Zhouzheng, Wu Zhiqiang, Xie Zhenye | 37.79 | Q, NR |
| 5 | 2 | 6 | France | Amaury Golitin, Jimmy Vicaut, Méba-Mickaël Zeze, Mouhamadou Fall | 37.88 | q, SB |
| 6 | 1 | 2 | Brazil | Rodrigo do Nascimento, Vitor Hugo dos Santos, Derick Silva, Paulo André de Oliveira | 37.90 | Q, =AR |
| 7 | 2 | 3 | Netherlands | Joris van Gool, Taymir Burnet, Hensley Paulina, Churandy Martina | 37.91 | q, NR |
| 8 | 2 | 2 | Canada | Gavin Smellie, Aaron Brown, Brendon Rodney, Andre De Grasse | 37.91 | SB |
| 9 | 1 | 5 | United States | Christian Coleman, Justin Gatlin, Mike Rodgers, Cravon Gillespie | 38.03 | Q, SB |
| 10 | 1 | 4 | Italy | Federico Cattaneo, Marcell Jacobs, Davide Manenti, Filippo Tortu | 38.11 | NR |
| 11 | 1 | 7 | Jamaica | Oshane Bailey, Yohan Blake, Rasheed Dwyer, Tyquendo Tracey | 38.15 | SB |
| 12 | 2 | 7 | Germany | Julian Reus, Joshua Hartmann, Roy Schmidt, Marvin Schulte | 38.24 | SB |
| 13 | 1 | 8 | Ghana | Sean Safo-Antwi, Benjamin Azamati-Kwaku, Martin Owusu Antwi, Joseph Amoah | 38.24 | SB |
| | 1 | 3 | Turkey | Kayhan Özer, Jak Ali Harvey, Emre Zafer Barnes, Ramil Guliyev | DQ | 170.7 |
| | 2 | 8 | Nigeria | Enoch Olaoluwa Adegoke, Usheoritse Itsekiri, Ogho-Oghene Egwero, Adeseye Ogunlewe | DQ | 163.3(a) |
| | 1 | 9 | Qatar | | DNS | |

=== Final ===
The final was started on 5 October at 22:15.

| Rank | Lane | Nation | Athletes | Time | Notes |
|---|---|---|---|---|---|
| 1st place, gold medalist(s) | 8 | United States | Christian Coleman, Justin Gatlin, Mike Rodgers, Noah Lyles | 37.10 | WL, NR |
| 2nd place, silver medalist(s) | 7 | Great Britain & N.I. | Adam Gemili, Zharnel Hughes, Richard Kilty, Nethaneel Mitchell-Blake | 37.36 | AR |
| 3rd place, bronze medalist(s) | 4 | Japan | Shuhei Tada, Kirara Shiraishi, Yoshihide Kiryū, Abdul Hakim Sani Brown | 37.43 | AR |
| 4 | 6 | Brazil | Rodrigo do Nascimento, Vitor Hugo dos Santos, Derick Silva, Paulo André de Oliveira | 37.72 | AR |
| 5 | 5 | South Africa | Thando Dlodlo, Simon Magakwe, Clarence Munyai, Akani Simbine | 37.73 | |
| 6 | 9 | China | Su Bingtian, Xu Zhouzheng, Wu Zhiqiang, Bie Ge | 38.07 | |
| | 2 | France | Amaury Golitin, Jimmy Vicaut, Méba-Mickaël Zeze, Christophe Lemaitre | DNF | |
| | 3 | Netherlands | Joris van Gool, Taymir Burnet, Hensley Paulina, Churandy Martina | DQ; ~~37.80~~ | 170.7 |
