= 2009 World Youth Championships in Athletics – Boys' 100 metres =

The Boys' 100 metres at the 2009 World Youth Championships in Athletics was held at the Brixen-Bressanone Sport Arena on 8 and 9 July. The event was won by Prezel Hardy of the United States.

== Medalists ==
Gold	Silver	Bronze
Prezel Hardy; United States	Aaron Brown; Canada	Giovanni Galbieri; Italy

== Records ==
Prior to the competition, the following records were as follows.

World Youth Best	Rynell Parson (USA)	10.23	Indianapolis, USA	21 June 2007
Championship Record	Darrel Brown (TRI)	10.31	Debrecen, Hungary	13 July 2001
World Youth Leading	Prezel Hardy (USA)	10.34	Waco, United States	22 May 2009
World Youth Leading	Takumi Kuki (JPN)	10.34	Nara, Japan	19 June 2009

No new records were set during the competition.

== Heats ==
Qualification rule: first 2 of each heat (Q) plus the 4 fastest times (q) qualified.

== Semifinals ==
Qualification rule: first 4 of each heat (Q) qualified.

=== Heat 1 ===
Rank	Lane	Name	Nationality	Time	Notes
1	6	Prezel Hardy	United States	10.38	Q
2	5	Ryota Yamagata	Japan	10.61	Q
3	4	Huang Xiang	Canada	10.62	Q
4	3	Moriba Morain	Trinidad and Tobago	10.71	Q
5	7	Richmond Collins	South Africa	10.73	
6	2	Carlos Rodríguez	Puerto Rico	10.84	
7	1	Mateo Edward	Panama	10.88	
–	8	Ratu Tabakaucoro	Fiji	DNS	

Key: PB = Personal best, SB = Seasonal best

Wind: 1.1 m/s

=== Heat 2 ===
Rank	Lane	Name	Nationality	Time	Notes
1	6	Aaron Brown	Canada	10.49	Q
2	8	Jimmy Vicaut	France	10.56	Q
3	3	Giovanni Galbieri	Italy	10.59	Q
4	5	Takumi Kuki	Japan	10.61	Q
5	4	Tan Juquan	China	10.62	
6	7	Kemar Bailey-Cole	Jamaica	10.66	
7	2	Geno Jones	Bahamas	10.72	
8	1	Jamol James	Trinidad and Tobago	10.91	

Key: PB = Personal best, SB = Seasonal best

Wind: 1.3 m/s

== Final ==
Rank	Lane	Name	Nationality	Time	Notes
1st place, gold medalist(s)	6	Prezel Hardy	United States	10.57	
2nd place, silver medalist(s)	5	Aaron Brown	Canada	10.74	
3rd place, bronze medalist(s)	7	Giovanni Galbieri	Italy	10.79	
4	4	Ryota Yamagata	Japan	10.80	
5	8	Huang Xiang	China	10.83	
6	1	Takumi Kuki	Japan	10.88	
7	3	Jimmy Vicaut	France	10.89	
8	2	Moriba Morain	Trinidad and Tobago	10.94	

Key: PB = Personal best, SB = Seasonal best

Wind: −1.2 m/s
