= 2015 European Athletics U23 Championships – Men's 4 × 100 metres relay =

The men's 4×100 metres relay event at the 2015 European Athletics U23 Championships was held in Tallinn, Estonia, at Kadriorg Stadium on 12 July.

== Medalists ==
| Gold | Guy-Elphège Anouman; Mickaël-Meba Zézé; Ken Romain; Stuart Dutamby; France |
| Silver | Marcel Kadlec; Michal Desenský; Jan Jirka; Zdeněk Stromšík; Czech Republic |
| Bronze | Aleksandr Yeliseyev; Dmitriy Sychev; Denis Ogarkov; Kirill Chernukhin; Russia |

== Results ==
=== Final ===
12 July

| Rank | Name | Nationality | Reaction Time | Time | Notes |
|---|---|---|---|---|---|
| 1st place, gold medalist(s) | France | Guy-Elphège Anouman; Mickaël-Meba Zézé; Ken Romain; Stuart Dutamby | 0.190 | 39.36 | |
| 2nd place, silver medalist(s) | Czech Republic | Marcel Kadlec; Michal Desenský; Jan Jirka; Zdeněk Stromšík | 0.153 | 39.38 | |
| 3rd place, bronze medalist(s) | Russia | Aleksandr Yeliseyev; Dmitriy Sychev; Denis Ogarkov; Kirill Chernukhin | 0.176 | 39.45 | NUR |
| 4 | Romania | Ioan Pitigoi; Alexandru Terpezan; Ionut Andrei Neagoe; Daniel Budin | 0.160 | 39.77 | NUR |
| 5 | Ireland | Jonathon Browning; Eanna Madden; Kieran Elliott; Marcus Lawler | 0.180 | 39.89 | NUR |
| 6 | Norway | Jonas Tapani Halonen; Joachim Sandberg; Håkon Morken; Salum Ageze Kashafali | 0.143 | 40.04 | NUR |
| | Netherlands | Rik Jansen; Simon Blok; Marvin Douma; Hensley Paulina | 0.163 | DQ | |
| | Sweden | Adam Denguir; Chris Brusenback; Jan Wocalewski; Jakob Lindbom | 0.156 | DNF | |

=== Heats ===
12 July

==== Heat 1 ====
| Rank | Nation | Competitors | Reaction Time | Time | Notes |
|---|---|---|---|---|---|
| 1 | France | Pierre Chalus; Mickaël-Meba Zézé; Ken Romain; Stuart Dutamby | 0.173 | 39.76 | Q |
| 2 | Netherlands | Rik Jansen; Simon Blok; Marvin Douma; Hensley Paulina | 0.159 | 39.89 | Q |
| 3 | Russia | Aleksandr Yeliseyev; Dmitriy Sychev; Denis Ogarkov; Kirill Chernukhin | 0.185 | 39.96 | Q |
| 4 | Sweden | Adam Denguir; Chris Brusenback; Jan Wocalewski; Jakob Lindbom | 0.156 | 40.08 | q |
| 5 | Norway | Jonas Tapani Halonen; Joachim Sandberg; Even Pettersen; Salum Ageze Kashafali | 0.159 | 40.50 | q |
| 6 | Switzerland | Yanier Bello; Silvan Wicki; Bastien Mouthon; Brahian Peña | 0.199 | 40.61 | |
| 7 | Hungary | Zalán Kádasi; Miklós Kovács; Bálint Móricz; Valdó Szűcs | 0.151 | 41.11 | |
| | Portugal | José Lopes; Ricardo Ribeiro; Ricardo dos Santos; Carlos Nascimento | | DQ | |

==== Heat 2 ====
| Rank | Nation | Competitors | Reaction Time | Time | Notes |
|---|---|---|---|---|---|
| 1 | Czech Republic | Marcel Kadlec; Michal Desenský; Jan Jirka; Zdeněk Stromšík | 0.145 | 39.76 | Q |
| 2 | Romania | Ioan Pitigoi; Alexandru Terpezan; Ionut Andrei Neagoe; Daniel Budin | 0.173 | 40.08 | NUR Q |
| 3 | Ireland | Jonathon Browning; Eanna Madden; Kieran Elliott; Marcus Lawler | 0.163 | 40.11 | NUR Q |
| 4 | Latvia | Jurgis Karulis; Kristaps Zūdiņš; Reinis Kreipans; Rihards Parandjuks | 0.134 | 41.95 | |
| | Poland | Dawid Olszowy; Dominik Kopeć; Karol Zalewski; Krzysztof Grześkowiak | 0.152 | DQ | |
| | Italy | Federico Cattaneo; Lorenzo Bilotti; Giacomo Tortu; Giovanni Galbieri | 0.174 | DQ | |
| | Finland | Elmo Lakka; Otto Ahlfors; Samuli Samuelsson; Roope Saarinen | 0.147 | DNF | |
| | Germany | Bastian Heber; Raphael Müller; Maximilian Ruth; Kai Alexander Sparenberg | 0.195 | DQ | |

== Participation ==
According to an unofficial count, 66 athletes from 16 countries participated in the event.

- Czech Republic (4)
- Finland (4)
- France (5)
- Germany (4)
- Hungary (4)
- Ireland (4)
- Italy (4)
- Latvia (4)
- Netherlands (4)
- Norway (5)
- Poland (4)
- Portugal (4)
- Romania (4)
- Russia (4)
- Sweden (4)
- Switzerland (4)
