= 2015 European Athletics U23 Championships – Men's 100 metres =

The men's 100 metres event at the 2015 European Athletics U23 Championships was held in Tallinn, Estonia, at Kadriorg Stadium on 9 and 10 July.

== Medalists ==
Gold	Giovanni Galbieri; Italy
Silver	Denis Dimitrov; Bulgaria
Bronze	Guy-Elphège Anouman; France

== Results ==
=== Final ===
10 July
Wind: 0.0 m/s

Rank	Name	Nationality	Reaction Time	Time	Notes
1st place, gold medalist(s)	Giovanni Galbieri	Italy	0.154	10.33	PB
2nd place, silver medalist(s)	Denis Dimitrov	Bulgaria	0.162	10.34	
3rd place, bronze medalist(s)	Guy-Elphège Anouman	France	0.172	10.39	
4	Hensley Paulina	Netherlands	0.124	10.40	
5	Dominik Kopeć	Poland	0.149	10.50	
6	Aleksandr Yeliseyev	Russia	0.180	10.56	
7	Federico Cattaneo	Italy	0.166	10.57	
8	Carlos Nascimento	Portugal	0.147	10.58	

=== Semifinals ===
9 July

==== Semifinal 1 ====
Wind: 0.5 m/s

Rank	Name	Nationality	Reaction Time	Time	Notes
1	Denis Dimitrov	Bulgaria	0.121	10.39	Q
2	Federico Cattaneo	Italy	0.160	10.49	Q
3	Aleksandr Yeliseyev	Russia	0.199	10.50	Q
4	Marvin René	France	0.157	10.50	
5	Krzysztof Grześkowiak	Poland	0.133	10.52	PB
6	Even Pettersen	Norway	0.129	10.57	SB
7	Patrick Domogala	Germany	0.151	10.75	
8	Lorenzo Bilotti	Italy	0.153	11.76	

==== Semifinal 2 ====
Wind: 2.3 m/s

Rank	Name	Nationality	Reaction Time	Time	Notes
1	Giovanni Galbieri	Italy	0.166	10.20 w	Q
2	Hensley Paulina	Netherlands	0.157	10.29 w	Q
3	Guy-Elphège Anouman	France	0.168	10.34 w	Q
4	Carlos Nascimento	Portugal	0.162	10.42 w	q
5	Dominik Kopeć	Poland	0.153	10.44 w	q
6	Zdeněk Stromšík	Czech Republic	0.128	10.45 w	
7	Roman Kravtsov	Ukraine	0.188	10.49 w	
8	Daniel Budin	Romania	0.205	10.54 w	

=== Heats ===
9 July

==== Heat 1 ====
Wind: -1.2 m/s

Rank	Name	Nationality	Reaction Time	Time	Notes
1	Aleksandr Yeliseyev	Russia	0.184	10.62	Q
2	Federico Cattaneo	Italy	0.184	10.63	Q
3	Patrick Domogala	Germany	0.147	10.68	Q
4	Volodymyr Suprun	Ukraine	0.147	10.69	
5	Riste Pandev	North Macedonia	0.172	10.71	
6	José Lopes	Portugal	0.147	10.74	
7	Alexandru Terpezan	Romania	0.162	10.89	
8	Przemysław Słowikowski	Poland	0.158	29.39	

==== Heat 2 ====
Wind: -1.2 m/s

Rank	Name	Nationality	Reaction Time	Time	Notes
1	Hensley Paulina	Netherlands	0.144	10.51	Q
2	Guy-Elphège Anouman	France	0.171	10.52	Q
3	Lorenzo Bilotti	Italy	0.151	10.60	Q
4	Even Pettersen	Norway	0.145	10.61	q
5	Krzysztof Grześkowiak	Poland	0.136	10.66	q
6	Morten Madsen	Denmark	0.137	10.72	
7	Zalán Kádasi	Hungary	0.150	10.81	
8	Jan Kramberger	Slovenia	0.178	10.84	

==== Heat 3 ====
Wind: -0.8 m/s

Rank	Name	Nationality	Reaction Time	Time	Notes
1	Giovanni Galbieri	Italy	0.191	10.51	Q
2	Denis Dimitrov	Bulgaria	0.163	10.54	Q
3	Roman Kravtsov	Ukraine	0.154	10.63	Q
4	Carlos Nascimento	Portugal	0.203	10.65	q
5	Imri Persiado	Israel	0.141	10.76	
6	Chris Brusenback	Sweden	0.213	10.79	
7	Markus Fuchs	Austria	0.162	10.96	
8	Kristaps Zūdiņš	Latvia	0.167	11.05	

==== Heat 4 ====
Wind: -1.4 m/s

Rank	Name	Nationality	Reaction Time	Time	Notes
1	Marvin René	France	0.168	10.50	Q
2	Dominik Kopeć	Poland	0.193	10.62	Q
3	Daniel Budin	Romania	0.206	10.63	Q
4	Zdeněk Stromšík	Czech Republic	0.142	10.64	q
5	Otto Ahlfors	Finland	0.153	10.70	
6	Adam Denguir	Sweden	0.169	10.70	
7	Salum Ageze Kashafali	Norway	0.168	10.73	
8	Francesco Molinari	San Marino	0.159	11.23	SB

== Participation ==
According to an unofficial count, 32 athletes from 22 countries participated in the event.

- Austria (1)
- Bulgaria (1)
- Czech Republic (1)
- Denmark (1)
- Finland (1)
- France (2)
- Germany (1)
- Hungary (1)
- Israel (1)
- Italy (3)
- Latvia (1)
- North Macedonia (1)
- Netherlands (1)
- Norway (2)
- Poland (3)
- Portugal (2)
- Romania (2)
- Russia (1)
- San Marino (1)
- Slovenia (1)
- Sweden (2)
- Ukraine (2)
