= Davide Manenti =

Italian sprinter

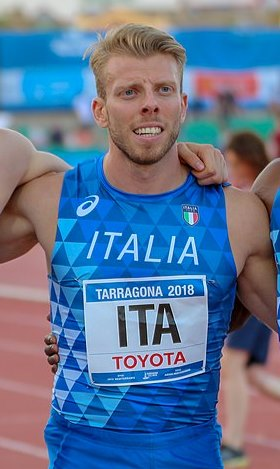
- Manenti at the 2018 Mediterranean Games in Tarragona

Personal information
- Nationality: Italian
- Born: April 16, 1989 (age 37) Turin, Italy
- Height: 1.78 m (5 ft 10 in)
- Weight: 80 kg (180 lb)

Sport
- Country: Italy
- Sport: Athletics
- Event: Sprint
- Club: C.S. Aeronautica Militare
- Coached by: Alessandro Nocera

Achievements and titles
- Personal bests: 60 m: 6.86 (2012); 100 m: 10.48 (2019); 200 m: 20.44 (2016); 400 m: 46.66 (2016); 4×100 m relay: 38.11 (2019); 4×400 m relay: 3:06.71 (2019)
Medal record
World Relays
Gold medal – first place	2021 Chorzów	4×100 m relay
European Team Championships
Bronze medal – third place	2015 Cheboksary	4×100 m relay
Mediterranean Games
Gold medal – first place	2013 Mersin	4×100 m relay
Gold medal – first place	2018 Tarragona	4×100 m relay
European U23 Championships
Gold medal – first place	Ostrava 2011	4×100 m relay

Davide Manenti (born 16 April 1989, in Turin) is an Italian sprinter. He competed in the 4 × 100 m relay event at the 2012 Summer Olympics and the 200 m event at the 2016 Summer Olympics. He has competed with the Italian national relay team and was a gold medallist in the 4 × 100 metres relay at the 2011 European Athletics U23 Championships, the 2013 Mediterranean Games, the 2018 Mediterranean Games and the 2021 World Athletics Relays. He holds a personal best of 10.48 seconds for the 100 metres and 20.44 seconds for the 200 metres.

== International competitions ==
Year	Competition	Venue	Position	Event	Notes
Representing Italy
2008	World Junior Championships	Bydgoszcz, Poland	20th (sf)	200 m	21.67 (-0.9 m/s)
2008	World Junior Championships	Bydgoszcz, Poland	9th (sf)	4 × 100 m relay	40.41
2011	European U23 Championships	Ostrava, Czech Republic	10th (sf)	200 m	21.01 (+0.8 m/s)
2011	European U23 Championships	Ostrava, Czech Republic	1st	4 × 100 m relay	39.05
2012	European Championships	Helsinki, Finland	15th (sf)	200 m	21.07
2012	Olympic Games	London, United Kingdom	13th (sf)	4 × 100 m relay	38.58
2013	Mediterranean Games	Mersin, Turkey	7th	200 m	20.86
2013	Mediterranean Games	Mersin, Turkey	1st	4 × 100 m relay	39.06
2015	European Team Championships	Cheboksary, Russia	3rd	4 × 100 m relay	38.71
2015	Universiade	Gwangju, South Korea	5th	200 m	20.82
2016	European Championships	Amsterdam, Netherlands	6th	200 m	20.66
2016	European Championships	Amsterdam, Netherlands	5th	4x100 m relay	38.69
2016	Olympic Games	Rio de Janeiro, Brazil	34th (h)	200 m	20.51
2018	Mediterranean Games	Tarragona, Spain	5th	200 m	20.96
2018	Mediterranean Games	Tarragona, Spain	1st	4 × 100 m relay	38.49
2018	European Championships	Berlin, Germany	19th (sf)	200 m	20.81
2018	European Championships	Berlin, Germany	–	4 × 100 m relay	DQ
2019	World Relays	Yokohama, Japan	8th	4 × 100 m relay	38.29
2019	World Championships	Doha, Qatar	10th (sf)	4 × 100 m relay	38.11
2021	World Relays	Chorzów, Poland	1st	4 × 100 m relay	39.21

=== Circuit wins ===
Meetings

- 2015
  - BAUHAUS-galan (Diamond League) - (Sweden) Stockholm, 4×100 m: 39.15 (gold)

=== National titles ===
Manenti won five national championships at senior level.

- Italian Athletics Championships
  - 200 m: 2015 (1)
  - 4×100 m relay: 2010, 2012 (2)
- Italian Athletics Indoor Championships
  - 4×200 m relay: 2010, 2011 (2)

== See also ==
- Italy national relay team
- Italy at the 2012 Summer Olympics
- Italy at the 2016 Summer Olympics
- Italy at the 2019 World Athletics Championships
- Italy at the 2012 European Athletics Championships
- Italy at the 2016 European Athletics Championships
- Italy at the 2018 European Athletics Championships
