= Thando Dlodlo =

South African sprinter (born 1999)

Personal information
- Nationality: South African
- Born: 22 April 1999 (age 27)

Sport
- Country: South Africa
- Sport: Athletics
- Event: Sprint
Medal record
Men's athletics
Representing South Africa
World Relays
Disqualified	2021 Chorzów	4×100 m relay (stripped)

Thandolwenkosi Dlodlo (born 22 April 1999) is a South African sprinter.

He ran in 10.08 in Trieste in July 2019 and won a bronze medal in the 4×100 metres relay at the African Games in Rabat the following month.

In March 2022, Dlodlo was banned retrospectively for two-and-a-half years after testing positive for "testosterone and its related compounds". South Africa was stripped of its 4x100m gold medal, won in Chorzów, Poland when Dlodlo was part of the team.

== International competitions ==
Year	Competition	Venue	Position	Event	Notes
Representing South Africa
2018	World U20 Championships	Tampere, Finland	30th (h)	100 m	10.70
2019	African Games	Rabat, Morocco	8th	100 m	10.33
2019	African Games	Rabat, Morocco	3rd	4 × 100 m relay	38.80
2019	World Championships	Doha, Qatar	29th (h)	100 m	10.25
2019	World Championships	Doha, Qatar	5th	4 × 100 m relay	37.73
2021	World Relays	Chorzów, Poland	1st (stripped)	4 × 100 m relay	~~38.71~~
