= Zdeněk Stromšík =

Czech sprinter

Personal information
- Nationality: Czech
- Born: 25 November 1994 (age 31) Valašské Meziříčí, Czech Republic
- Education: Technical University of Ostrava
- Height: 175 cm (5 ft 9 in)
- Weight: 77 kg (170 lb)

Sport
- Sport: Athletics
- Event: 100 metres
- Club: SSK Vítkovice
- Coached by: Jaroslav Jerry Vlček

Zdeněk Stromšík (born 25 November 1994) is a Czech sprinter. He represented his country in the 60 metres at the 2018 World Indoor Championships where he was injured and finished last in his heat.

== International competitions ==
Year	Competition	Venue	Position	Event	Notes
Representing the Czech Republic
2010	Youth Olympic Games	Singapore	3rd (C)	100 m	11.45
2012	World Junior Championships	Barcelona, Spain	54th (h)	100 m	11.02
2012	World Junior Championships	Barcelona, Spain	–	4 × 100 m relay	DQ
2013	European Junior Championships	Rieti, Italy	4th	100 m	10.56
2015	European Indoor Championships	Prague, Czech Republic	26th (h)	60 m	6.74
2015	European U23 Championships	Tallinn, Estonia	6th (sf)	100 m	10.45 (w)
2015	European U23 Championships	Tallinn, Estonia	2nd	4 × 100 m relay	39.38
2017	Universiade	Taipei, Taiwan	22nd (qf)	100 m	10.68
2018	World Indoor Championships	Birmingham, United Kingdom	48th (h)	60 m	7.41
2018	European Championships	Berlin, Germany	17th (sf)	100 m	10.37
2018	European Championships	Berlin, Germany	6th (h)	4 × 100 m relay	38.94^{1}
2019	European Indoor Championships	Glasgow, United Kingdom	19th (sf)	60 m	6.78
2019	World Relays	Yokohama, Japan	12th (h)	4 × 100 m relay	38.77
2019	Universiade	Naples, Italy	12th (sf)	100 m	10.51
2019	Universiade	Naples, Italy	8th	200 m	21.32
2019	Universiade	Naples, Italy	6th	4 × 100 m relay	40.54
2021	European Indoor Championships	Toruń, Poland	37th (h)	60 m	6.77
2021	World Relays	Chorzów, Poland	–	4 × 100 m relay	DNF
2022	European Championships	Munich, Germany	16th (h)	100 m	10.60
2022	European Championships	Munich, Germany	13th (h)	4 × 100 m relay	39.41
2023	European Indoor Championships	Istanbul, Turkey	32nd (h)	60 m	6.79
2024	European Championships	Rome, Italy	16th (h)	100 m	10.39
2024	European Championships	Rome, Italy	16th (h)	100 m	10.39
2024	European Championships	Rome, Italy	11th (h)	4 × 100 m relay	39.22

^{1}Did not start in the final

== Personal bests ==
Outdoor

- 100 metres – 10.16 (+1.7 m/s, Tábor 2018)
- 100 metres - 10.11 (+ 3.0 m/s, Brno 2018)
- 200 metres – 21.46 (+0.2 m/s, Hodonín 2013)

Indoor

- 60 metres – 6.59 (Ostrava 2023)
