= Hensley Paulina =

Dutch olympic sprinter

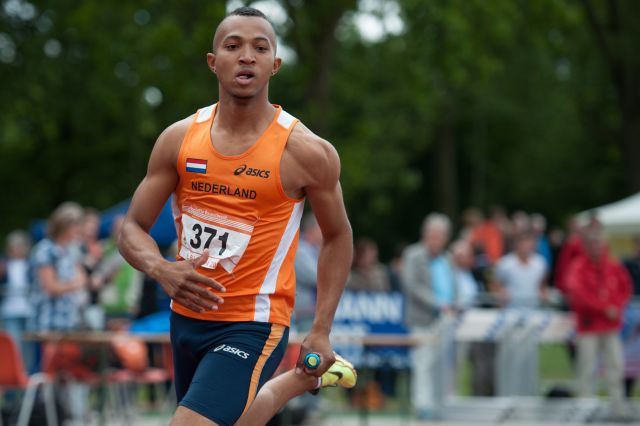
- Hensley Paulina in 2013

Personal information
- Born: 26 June 1993 (age 33) Willemstad, Curaçao, Netherlands Antilles
- Height: 1.83 m (6 ft 0 in)
- Weight: 76 kg (168 lb)

Sport
- Country: Netherlands
- Sport: Track and field
- Events: 100 metres 200 metres
- Coached by: Wendell Prince; Jurgen Faneyt; Dennis Mitchell; Rana Reider

Hensley Paulina (born 26 June 1993) is a Dutch sprinter. He competed in the 4 × 100 metres relay event at the 2015 World Championships in Beijing narrowly missing the final.

== Competition record ==
| Year | Competition | Venue | Position | Event | Notes |
Representing Netherlands Antilles and Curaçao
| 2009 | CARIFTA Games (U17) | Vieux Fort, Saint Lucia | 14th (h) | 100 m | 11.09 |
| 2009 | CARIFTA Games (U17) | Vieux Fort, Saint Lucia | 10th (h) | 200 m | 22.57 |
| 2009 | World Youth Championships | Brixen, Italy | 33rd (qf) | 100 m | 11.05 |
| 2010 | CARIFTA Games (U20) | George Town, Cayman Islands | – | 100 m | DQ |
| 2010 | CARIFTA Games (U20) | George Town, Cayman Islands | 4th | 200 m | 21.42 |
| 2010 | South American Games | Medellín, Colombia | 4th | 100 m | 10.55 (w) |
| 2010 | World Junior Championships | Moncton, Canada | – | 100 m | DQ |
| 2011 | CARIFTA Games (U20) | Montego Bay, Jamaica | 12th (h) | 100 m | 10.92 |
| 2011 | CARIFTA Games (U20) | Montego Bay, Jamaica | 9th (h) | 200 m | 22.05 |
| 2011 | Central American and Caribbean Championships | Mayagüez, Puerto Rico | 25th (h) | 100 m | 10.81 |
| 2011 | Central American and Caribbean Championships | Mayagüez, Puerto Rico | 9th (h) | 4 × 100 m relay | 41.49 |
Representing the Netherlands
| 2012 | World Junior Championships | Barcelona, Spain | 41st (h) | 100 m | 10.81 |
| 2013 | European U23 Championships | Tampere, Finland | 3rd | 100 m | 10.48 |
| 2013 | European U23 Championships | Tampere, Finland | – | 4 × 100 m relay | DNF |
| 2013 | World Championships | Moscow, Russia | 5th | 4 × 100 m relay | 38.37 |
| 2014 | IAAF World Relays | Nassau, Bahamas | 8th (h) | 4 × 100 m relay | 38.52 |
| 2014 | European Championships | Zürich, Switzerland | 5th | 4 × 100 m relay | 38.60 |
| 2015 | IAAF World Relays | Nassau, Bahamas | 6th (B) | 4 × 100 m relay | 39.25 |
| 2015 | European U23 Championships | Tallinn, Estonia | 4th | 100 m | 10.40 |
| 2015 | European U23 Championships | Tallinn, Estonia | 9th (h) | 200 m | 21.17 |
| 2015 | European U23 Championships | Tallinn, Estonia | 3rd (h) | 4 × 100 m relay | 39.89^{1} |
| 2015 | World Championships | Beijing, China | 8th (h) | 4 × 100 m relay | 38.41 |
| 2016 | World Indoor Championships | Portland, United States | 23rd (sf) | 60 m | 6.73 |
| 2016 | European Championships | Amsterdam, Netherlands | 18th (sf) | 100 m | 10.33 |
| 2016 | European Championships | Amsterdam, Netherlands | 23rd (sf) | 200 m | 23.49 |
| 2016 | Olympic Games | Rio de Janeiro, Brazil | 14th (h) | 4 × 100 m relay | 38.53 |
| 2017 | IAAF World Relays | Nassau, Bahamas | 4th (h) | 4 × 100 m relay | 38.71^{1} |
| 2017 | World Championships | London, United Kingdom | 11th (h) | 4 × 100 m relay | 38.66 |
| 2018 | European Championships | Berlin, Germany | 19th (sf) | 100 m | 10.38 |
| 2018 | European Championships | Berlin, Germany | 3rd | 4 × 100 m relay | 38.03 |
| 2019 | World Relays | Yokohama, Japan | 10th (h) | 4 × 100 m relay | 38.67 |
| 2019 | World Championships | Doha, Qatar | 7th (h) | 4 × 100 m relay | 37.91^{2} |
| 2021 | World Relays | Chorzów, Poland | – | 4 × 100 m relay | DNF |
| 2022 | World Championships | Eugene, United States | 13th (h) | 4 × 100 m relay | 39.07 |
| 2023 | World Championships | Budapest, Hungary | – | 4 × 100 m relay | DNF |

^{1}Did not finish in the final
^{2}Disqualified in the final

== Personal bests ==
Outdoor

- 100 metres – 10.26 (+1.4 m/s, Heusden-Zolder 2014)
- 200 metres – 21.41 (+0.7 m/s, George Town 2010)

Indoor

- 60 metres – 6.64 (Jablonec nad Nisou 2016)
