= Giovanni Galbieri =

Italian sprinter

Personal information
- Nationality: Italian
- Born: 8 January 1993 (age 33) Negrar, Italy

Sport
- Sport: Athletics
- Event: Sprints

Achievements and titles
- Personal bests: 100 m: 10.32 (2015); 200 m: 22.16 (2015)
Medal record
Men's athletics
Representing Italy
World Youth Championships
Bronze medal – third place	2009 Brixen	100 m

Giovanni Galbieri (born 8 January 1993) is an Italian sprinter.

== Biography ==
He won the bronze medal over 100 metres at the 2009 World Youth Championships in Athletics.

Year	Time	Venue	Date	World Rank
2013	10.57	(Italy) Rieti	14 June	
2012	10.48	(Spain) Barcelona	11 July	
2011	10.51	(Italy) Rovereto	1 May	
2010	10.61	(Italy) Rieti	3 October	
2009	10.59	(Italy) Brixen	9 July	

== Achievements ==
Year	Competition	Venue	Position	Event	Time	Notes
2009	World Youth Championships	(Italy) Brixen	3rd	100 metres	10.79	
2012	World Junior Championships	(Spain) Barcelona	SF	100 metres	10.48	
2013	European U23 Championships	(Finland) Tampere	7th	4×100 metres relay	39.55	
2015	European U23 Championships	(Estonia) Tallinn	1st	100 metres	10.33	
2015	European U23 Championships	(Estonia) Tallinn	—	4×100 metres relay	DQ	
