= Filippo Tortu =

Italian sprinter (born 1998)

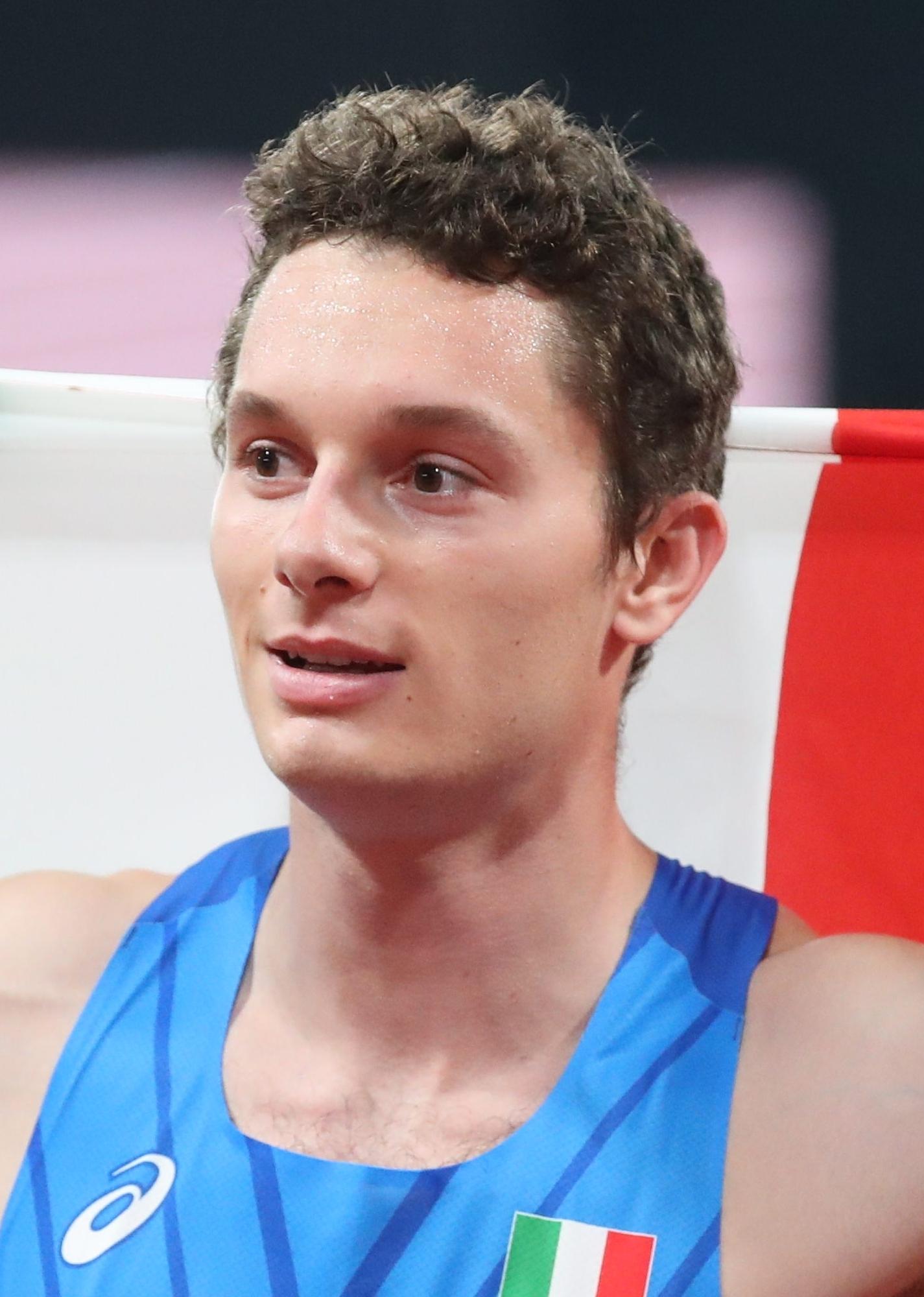
- Tortu at the 2022 European Championships

Personal information
- Born: 15 June 1998 (age 28) Milan, Italy
- Height: 1.87 m (6 ft 2 in)
- Weight: 75 kg (165 lb)

Sport
- Country: Italy
- Sport: Athletics
- Events: 100 m, 200 m
- Club: G.S. Fiamme Gialle
- Coached by: Salvino Tortu

Achievements and titles
- Personal bests: 60 m: 6.58 (2019); 100 m: 9.99 (2018); 200 m: 20.10 (2022); 4 × 100 m relay: 37.50 (2021) NR
Medal record
Men's athletics
Representing Italy
Event	1st	2nd	3rd
Olympic Games	1	0	0
World Championships	0	1	0
World Relays	1	0	0
European Championships	1	1	1
European Games	0	1	0
Mediterranean Games	1	0	0
World U20 Championships	0	1	0
European U20 Championships	1	1	0
Total	5	5	1
Olympic Games
Gold medal – first place	2020 Tokyo	4 × 100 m relay
World Championships
Silver medal – second place	2023 Budapest	4 × 100 m relay
World Relays
Gold medal – first place	2021 Chorzów	4 × 100 m relay
European Championships
Gold medal – first place	2024 Rome	4 × 100 m relay
Silver medal – second place	2024 Rome	200 m
Bronze medal – third place	2022 Munich	200 m
European Games
Silver medal – second place	2023 Kraków-Małopolska	4 × 100 m relay
Mediterranean Games
Gold medal – first place	2018 Tarragona	4 × 100 m relay
World U20 Championships
Silver medal – second place	2016 Bydgoszcz	100 m
European U20 Championships
Gold medal – first place	2017 Grosseto	100 m
Silver medal – second place	2017 Grosseto	4 × 100 m relay

Filippo Tortu (born 15 June 1998) is an Italian sprinter. He was the first Italian to break the 10-second barrier and is the third fastest Italian in the 100 metres behind Marcell Jacobs and Chituru Ali. He ran the anchor leg in the 4 × 100 m relay of the Italian team that won a gold medal at the 2020 Summer Olympics. His leg was the fifth fastest anchor of all time.

He is coached by his father, Salvino Tortu, a former Sardinian sprinter who moved to Lombardy.

== Biography ==
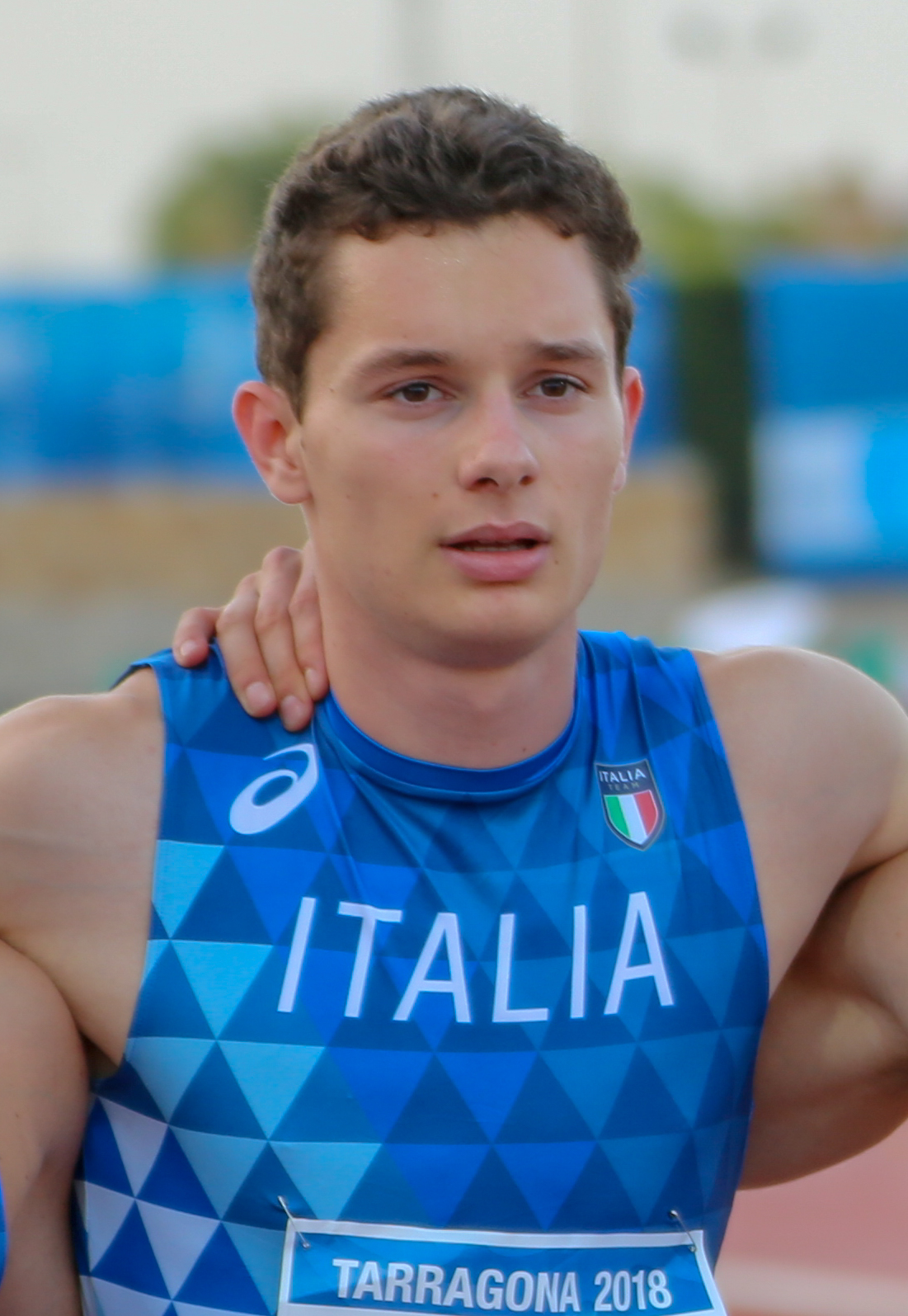
Tortu at the 2018 Mediterranean Games

Born in Milan to a Sardinian father, former runner Salvino, and a Lombard mother, Paola Confalonieri, he began to play sports at the age of eight years, dividing his time between track and field and basketball.

In 2010 and 2011, he won the title of fastest runner in Milan while competing in the categories of prima media and seconda media (first and second years of middle school). He then began to dedicate himself entirely to track and field, coached by his father. In 2013, he won the 80 meters in the Italian championships in Jesolo (category cadetto) with a time of 9.09.

He finished third at the 2014 trials for the European Youth Olympic Games, but did not qualify. He did, however, qualify for the 200 meters, but in a preliminary race for the Youth Olympics, he fell at the finish line; he broke both arms, and as a result, he was not able to compete in the finals. In 2015, he broke the Italian youth record in the 100 meters with a time of 10.33, as well as in the 200 meters with a time of 20.92.

In 2016, he broke the Italian junior record of 100 meters in Savona, twice obtaining a time of 10.24; this record had been unbeaten for 34 years, and was held by Pierfrancesco Pavoni who ran the distance in 10.25 at the 1982 European Championships. A month later, he landed his first Italian title in Rieti, winning the final of 100 meters in 10.32. He took part in the European Championships in Amsterdam, where he qualified for the semifinals by winning with a time of 10.19, which was a new Italian junior record. He failed, however, to reach the final by 0.03 seconds. He also ran the final leg of 4 × 100 relay, finishing in 5th place. He participated at the World U20 Championships in Bydgoszcz, where he won the silver medal in 100 meters with a time of 10.24, behind American Noah Lyles (10.17). In the same championships, he participated in the 4 × 100 relay where they finished 7th.

At the 2020 Summer Olympics, Tortu competed in the men's 100 m. He reached the semi-final, but did not qualify for the finals. Tortu also ran the anchor leg in the 4 × 100 relay final, coming from behind to pip the British team by one-hundredth of a second, running his leg with only 8.845 seconds and winning an unexpected historic gold.

In 2024, he competed at the Summer Olympics, this time competing in the 200 metres instead. He reached the semifinal round but did not qualify for the finals. He ran the anchor leg of the 4 × 100 relay to defend their title, but finished in 4th.

== National records ==
- 100 metres: 9.99 (+0.2 m/s; (Spain) Madrid, 22 June 2018) - former Italian record
- 4 × 100 m relay: 37.50 ( (Japan) Tokyo, 6 August 2021), he ran final leg in the team with Lorenzo Patta, Marcell Jacobs, Eseosa Desalu

== Achievements ==
Year	Competition	Venue	Position	Event	Time	Notes
2014	Youth Olympic Games	(China) Nanjing	Final	200 metres	DNS	
2016	European Championships	(Netherlands) Amsterdam	9th (sf)	100 metres	10.19	
2016	European Championships	(Netherlands) Amsterdam	5th	4 × 100 m relay	38.69	
2016	World U20 Championships	(Poland) Bydgoszcz	2nd	100 metres	10.24	
2016	World U20 Championships	(Poland) Bydgoszcz	7th	4 × 100 m relay	40.02	
2017	IAAF World Relays	(The Bahamas) Nassau	Heat	4 × 100 m relay	DQ	R170.7
2017	European U20 Championships	(Italy) Grosseto	1st	100 metres	10.73 (–4.3)	
2017	European U20 Championships	(Italy) Grosseto	2nd	4 × 100 m relay	39.50	
2017	World Championships	(United Kingdom) London	17th (sf)	200 metres	20.62	w
2018	Mediterranean Games	(Spain) Tarragona	1st	4 × 100 m relay	38.49	
2018	European Championships	(Germany) Berlin	5th	100 metres	10.08	
2018	European Championships	(Germany) Berlin	Heat	4 × 100 m relay	DQ	R170.7
2019	IAAF World Relays	(Japan) Yokohama	Final	4 × 100 m relay	DNF	
2019	World Championships	(Qatar) Doha	7th	100 metres	10.07	SB
2019	World Championships	(Qatar) Doha	10th (sf)	4 × 100 m relay	38.11	NR
2021	World Athletics Relays	(Poland) Chorzów	1st	4 × 100 m relay	39.21	
2021	Olympic Games	(Japan) Tokyo	18th (sf)	100 metres	10.16	
2021	Olympic Games	(Japan) Tokyo	1st	4 × 100 m relay	37.50	NR
2022	World Championships	(United States) Eugene	9th (sf)	200 metres	20.10	
2022	World Championships	(United States) Eugene	10th (h)	4 × 100 m relay	38.74	SB
2022	European Championships	(Germany) Munich	3rd	200 metres	20.27	
2023	European Team Championships	(Poland) Chorzów	5th	200 metres	20.61	
2023	European Team Championships	(Poland) Chorzów	2nd	4 × 100 m relay	38.47	SB
2023	World Championships	(Hungary) Budapest	25th (h)	200 metres	20.46	
2023	World Championships	(Hungary) Budapest	2nd	4 × 100 m relay	37.62	SB
2024	World Athletics Relays	(The Bahamas) Nassau	Final	4 × 100 m relay	DQ	
2024	European Championships	(Italy) Rome	2nd	200 metres	20.41	
2024	European Championships	(Italy) Rome	1st	4 × 100 m relay	37.82	EL
2025	World Relays	(China) Guangzhou	5th	4 × 100 m relay	38.20	

== Personal bests ==
Outdoor

- 100 metres: 9.99 (+0.2 m/s; (Spain) Madrid, 22 June 2018)
- Fastest 100 metre anchor leg: 8.845 ( (Japan) Tokyo, 5 August 2021)
- 200 metres: 20.10 (+0.3 m/s; (United States) Eugene, 19 July 2022)

Indoor

- 60 metres: 6.58 ( (Italy) Ancona, 20 January 2019)

== National titles ==
- Italian Athletics Championships
  - 100 metres: 2016
  - 200 metres: 2023
- Italian Athletics Indoor Championships
  - 60 metres: 2020

== See also ==
- 2018 in 100 metres (19th with 9.99)
- 2019 in 100 metres (46th with 10.07)
- 2020 in 100 metres (15th with 10.07)
- List of Italian records in athletics
- Italian all-time lists - 100 metres
- Italian all-time lists - 200 metres
- Italian national track relay team

Awards
Preceded by Gianluigi Buffon	Italian Sportsman of the Year; 2018	Succeeded by Roberto Mancini
