= Julian Reus =

German sprinter (born 1988)

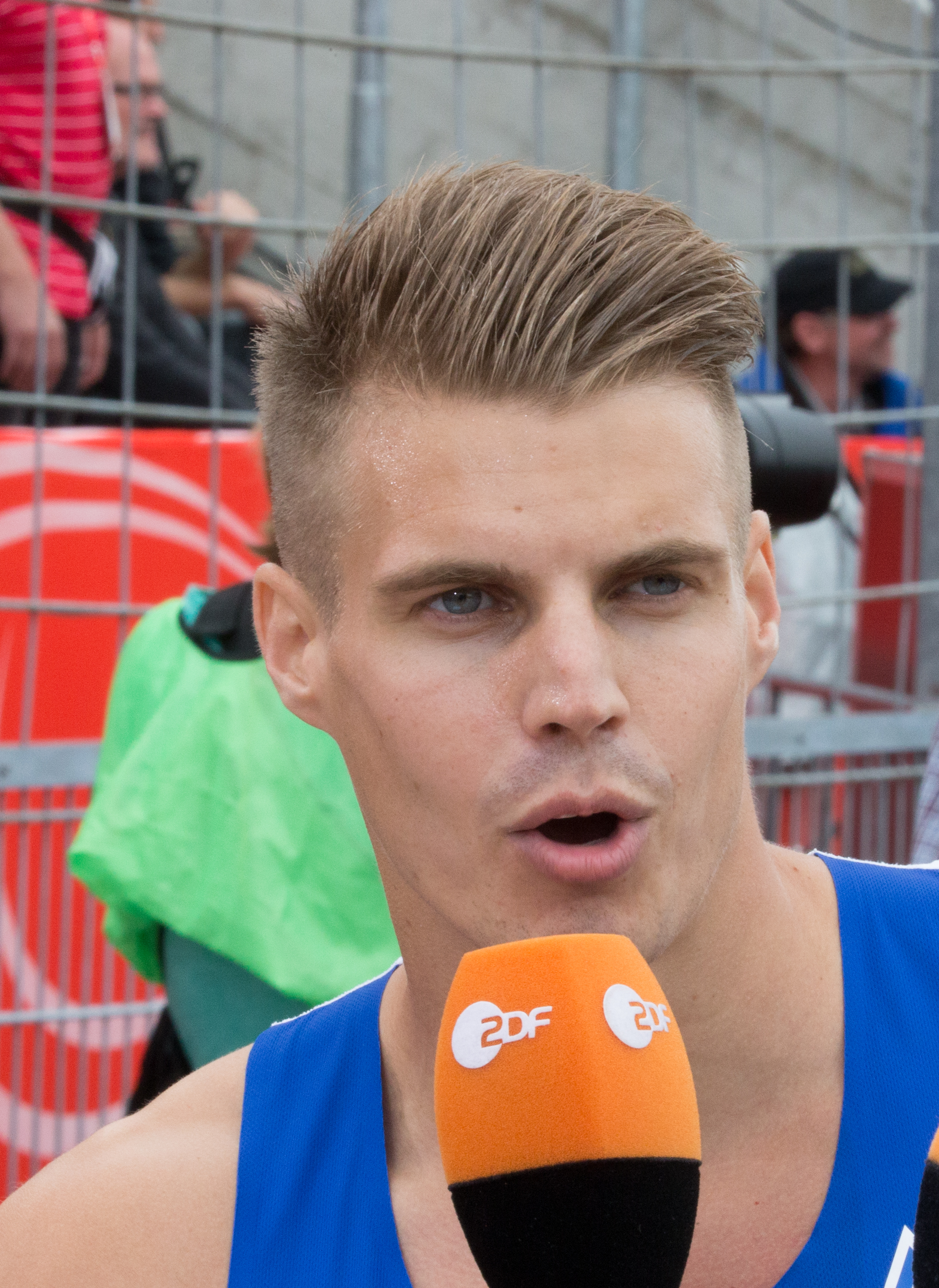
- Reus in 2014

Personal information
- Full name: Julian Reus
- Born: 28 April 1988 (age 38) Hanau, West Germany
- Height: 176 cm (5 ft 9 in)
- Weight: 75 kg (165 lb)

Sport
- Country: Germany
- Sport: Track and field
- Event: Sprint
Medal record
European Championships
Silver medal – second place	2012 Helsinki	4 × 100 m relay
Silver medal – second place	2014 Zurich	4 × 100 m relay
Bronze medal – third place	2016 Amsterdam	4 × 100 m relay
European Indoor Championships
Bronze medal – third place	2015 Prague	60 m

Julian Reus (born 29 April 1988) is a German track and field athlete who competes in the 100 and 200 meters dash. His 100 m personal best of 10.01 seconds was once the German record. Though unofficial according to IAAF regulations of a maximum +2.0 m/s tailwind for a valid time, he also clocked 9.99 seconds (+4.8 m/s) during the men's 100 metres at the 2017 IAAF Diamond League.

Reus won the silver medal at the 2012 European Athletics Championships in Helsinki at the 4 × 100 metres relay.

== Competition record ==
Year	Competition	Venue	Position	Event	Notes
Representing Germany
2005	World Youth Championships	Marrakesh, Morocco	18th (sf)	100 m	10.89
2005	World Youth Championships	Marrakesh, Morocco	29th (h)	200 m	21.94
2006	World Junior Championships	Beijing, China	29th (h)	100 m	10.67 (+0.9 m/s)
2006	World Junior Championships	Beijing, China	9th (sf)	200 m	21.30 (-1.0 m/s)
2006	World Junior Championships	Beijing, China	—	4 × 100 m relay	DNF
2007	European Junior Championships	Hengelo, Netherlands	1st	100 m	10.38
2007	European Junior Championships	Hengelo, Netherlands	2nd	200 m	20.87
2007	European Junior Championships	Hengelo, Netherlands	1st	4 × 100 m relay	39.81
2007	World Championships	Osaka, Japan	6th	4 × 100 m relay	38.62
2012	European Championships	Helsinki, Finland	14th (sf)	100 m	10.44
2012	European Championships	Helsinki, Finland	2nd	4 × 100 m relay	38.44
2012	Olympic Games	London, United Kingdom	11th (h)	4 × 100 m relay	38.37
2013	European Indoor Championships	Gothenburg, Sweden	6th	60 m	6.62
2013	World Championships	Moscow, Russia	28th (h)	100 m	10.27
2013	World Championships	Moscow, Russia	4th	4 × 100 m relay	38.04
2014	World Relays	Nassau, Bahamas	–	4 × 200 m relay	DNF
2014	European Championships	Zurich, Switzerland	10th (sf)	100 m	10.35
2014	European Championships	Zurich, Switzerland	2nd	4 × 100 m relay	38.09
2015	European Indoor Championships	Prague, Czech Republic	3rd	60 m	6.60
2015	World Championships	Beijing, China	24th (sf)	100 m	10.28
2015	World Championships	Beijing, China	31st (h)	200 m	20.51
2015	World Championships	Beijing, China	4th	4 × 100 m relay	38.15
2016	European Championships	Amsterdam, Netherlands	16th (sf)	100 m	10.28
2016	European Championships	Amsterdam, Netherlands	13th (sf)	200 m	20.83
2016	European Championships	Amsterdam, Netherlands	3rd	4 × 100 m relay	38.47
2016	Olympic Games	Rio de Janeiro, Brazil	45th (h)	100 m	10.34
2016	Olympic Games	Rio de Janeiro, Brazil	24th (h)	200 m	20.39
2016	Olympic Games	Rio de Janeiro, Brazil	9th (h)	4 × 100 m relay	38.26
2017	World Relays	Nassau, Bahamas	2nd (B)	4 × 100 m relay	39.15
2017	World Championships	London, United Kingdom	26th (h)	100 m	10.25
2017	World Championships	London, United Kingdom	10th (h)	4 × 100 m relay	38.66
2018	European Championships	Berlin, Germany	18th (sf)	100 m	10.37
2018	European Championships	Berlin, Germany	–	4 × 100 m relay	DNF
2019	World Relays	Yokohama, Japan	16th (h)	4 × 100 m relay	38.91
2019	World Championships	Doha, Qatar	12th (h)	4 × 100 m relay	38.24
2021	World Relays	Chorzów, Poland	4th (h)	4 × 100 m relay	38.70
2021	Olympic Games	Tokyo, Japan	6th	4 × 100 m relay	38.12

== See also ==
- German all-time top lists – 100 metres
