= Carlos Nascimento (athlete) =

Portuguese sprinter

Personal information
- Full name: Carlos Manuel Sampaio Nascimento
- Born: 12 October 1994 (age 32) Matosinhos

Sport
- Sport: Athletics
- Events: 60 m, 100 m, 200 m
Medal record
Men's athletics
Representing Portugal
European Games
Gold medal – first place	2019 Minsk	100 m

Carlos Manuel Sampaio Nascimento (born 12 October 1994) is a Portuguese sprinter. He competed in the 60 metres at the 2016 IAAF World Indoor Championships.

== Competition record ==
Year	Competition	Venue	Position	Event	Notes
Representing Portugal
2010	Youth Olympic Games	Singapore	1st (B)	100 m	10.79
2011	World Youth Championships	Lille, France	30th (h)	100 m	10.41
2012	World Junior Championships	Barcelona, Spain	7th	100 m	10.41
2012	World Junior Championships	Barcelona, Spain	28th (h)	200 m	21.38
2013	European Junior Championships	Rieti, Italy	17th (sf)	100 m	10.82
2013	European Junior Championships	Rieti, Italy	8th	4 × 100 m relay	40.94
2015	European U23 Championships	Tallinn, Estonia	8th	100 m	10.58
2015	European U23 Championships	Tallinn, Estonia	–	4 × 100 m relay	DQ
2016	World Indoor Championships	Portland, United States	26th (h)	60 m	6.71
2016	Ibero-American Championships	Rio de Janeiro, Brazil	14th (sf)	100 m	10.52
2016	European Championships	Amsterdam, Netherlands	21st (h)	100 m	10.54
2016	European Championships	Amsterdam, Netherlands	13th (h)	4 × 100 m relay	39.52
2018	European Championships	Berlin, Germany	14th (sf)	100 m	10.31
2018	European Championships	Berlin, Germany	7th	4 × 100 m relay	39.07
2019	European Indoor Championships	Glasgow, United Kingdom	13th (sf)	60 m	6.71
2019	European Games	Minsk, Belarus	1st	100 m	10.35
2019	Universiade	Naples, Italy	8th (sf)	100 m	10.45^{1}
2021	European Indoor Championships	Toruń, Poland	5th	60 m	6.65
2021	Olympic Games	Tokyo, Japan	45th (h)	100 m	10.37
2022	World Indoor Championships	Belgrade, Serbia	15th (sf)	60 m	6.65
2022	Ibero-American Championships	La Nucía, Spain	12th (h)	100 m	10.65
2022	Ibero-American Championships	La Nucía, Spain	–	4 × 100 m relay	DNF
2022	European Championships	Munich, Germany	21st (sf)	100 m	10.40
2023	European Indoor Championships	Istanbul, Turkey	20th (sf)	60 m	6.71
2024	European Championships	Rome, Italy	20th (sf)	100 m	10.43
2024	European Championships	Rome, Italy	12th (h)	4 × 100 m relay	39.26
2025	European Indoor Championships	Apeldoorn, Netherlands	7th	60 m	6.62

^{1}Did not start in the final

== Personal bests ==
Outdoor

- 100 metres – 10.13 (+1.0 m/s, Braga 2018)
- 200 metres – 21.05 (+0.0 m/s, Braga 2018)

Indoor

- 60 metres – 6.62 (Toruń 2021)
- 200 metres – 21.25 (Pombal 2018)
