= Volodymyr Suprun =

Ukrainian sprinter (born 1994)

Personal information
- Nationality: Ukrainian
- Born: 24 January 1994 (age 31)

Sport
- Country: Ukraine
- Sport: Track and field
- Event(s): 100 metres 4 × 100 metres relay

Volodymyr Suprun (born 24 January 1994) is a Ukrainian sprinter. He competed in the 4 × 100 metres relay event at the 2015 World Championships in Athletics in Beijing, China.

== International competitions ==
Representing Ukraine
Year	Competition	Venue	Position	Event	Notes
2015	European U23 Championships	Tallinn, Estonia	11th (sf)	200 metres	21.40
2015	European U23 Championships	Tallinn, Estonia	17th (h)	100 m	10.69
2015	World Championships	Beijing, China	11th (h)	4 × 100 m relay	38.79
2016	European Championships	Amsterdam, Netherlands	8th (f)	4 × 100 m relay	39.46
2016	European Championships	Amsterdam, Netherlands	24th (h)	100 m	10.58
2017	European Indoor Championships	Belgrade, Serbia	13th (sf)	60 m	6.75
2018	European Championships	Berlin, Germany	5th	4 × 100 m relay	38.71
2019	European Indoor Championships	Glasgow, United Kingdom	31st (h)	60 m	6.87
2019	World Relays	Yokohama, Japan	14th (h)	4 × 100 m relay	38.84
