= Jak Ali Harvey =

Jamaican-Turkish sprinter (born 1989)

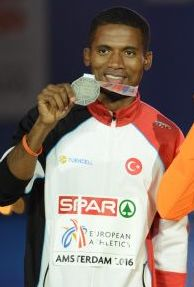
- Harvey at the 2016 European Championships.

Personal information
- Nationality: Turkey
- Born: 4 May 1989 (age 37) Hanover Parish, Jamaica
- Height: 1.83 m (6 ft 0 in)
- Weight: 74 kg (163 lb)

Sport
- Sport: Track and field
- Events: 100 metres, 200 metres

Achievements and titles
- Personal bests: 100 m 9.92 (Erzurum 2016); 200 m 20.38 (Ankara 2015)
Medal record
Men's athletics
Representing Turkey
European Championships
| Silver medal – second place | 2016 Amsterdam | 100 m |
| Silver medal – second place | 2018 Berlin | 4 × 100 m relay |
| Bronze medal – third place | 2018 Berlin | 100 m |
European Games
| Bronze medal – third place | 2019 Minsk | 100 m |
Islamic Solidarity Games
| Gold medal – first place | 2021 Konya | 4 × 100 m relay |
Mediterranean Games
| Gold medal – first place | 2018 Tarragona | 100 m |
| Gold medal – first place | 2022 Oran | 100 m |
| Silver medal – second place | 2018 Tarragona | 4 × 100 m relay |
| Silver medal – second place | 2022 Oran | 4 × 100 m relay |
Representing Europe
Continental Cup
| Silver medal – second place | 2018 Ostrava | 4 × 100 m relay |
Representing Jamaica
Summer Universiade
| Gold medal – first place | 2011 Shenzhen | 100 m |
NACAC U-23 Championships
| Silver medal – second place | 2010 Miramar | 4 × 100 meters |

Jak Ali Harvey, formerly Jacques Montgomery Harvey (born 4 May 1989 in Hanover Parish, Jamaica) is a former Jamaican sprinter. He now competes for Turkey.

Harvey won the silver medal of the 100 m event at the 2016 European Athletics Championships in Amsterdam, Netherlands. He became the first ever Turkish athlete to win a medal in that event at the European Championships.

== Competition record ==
| Year | Competition | Venue | Position | Event | Notes |
Representing Jamaica
| 2010 | NACAC U23 Championships | Miramar, Florida, United States | 5th | 100 m | 10.26 (+1.7 m/s) |
| 2010 | NACAC U23 Championships | Miramar, Florida, United States | 2nd | 4 × 100 m relay | 39.36 |
| 2010 | Central American and Caribbean Games | Mayagüez, Puerto Rico | 1st (h) | 4 × 100 m relay | 38.96 |
| 2011 | Universiade | Shenzhen, China | 1st | 100 m | 10.14 |
| 2011 | Universiade | Shenzhen, China | – (h) | 4 × 100 m relay | DQ |
Representing Turkey
| 2015 | World Championships | Beijing, China | 15th (sf) | 100 m | 10.08 |
| 2016 | European Championships | Amsterdam, Netherlands | 2nd | 100 m | 10.07 |
| 2016 | European Championships | Amsterdam, Netherlands | 14th (h) | 4 × 100 m relay | 39.58 |
| 2016 | Olympic Games | Rio de Janeiro, Brazil | 10th (sf) | 100 m | 10.03 |
| 2016 | Olympic Games | Rio de Janeiro, Brazil | 40th (h) | 200 m | 20.58 |
| 2016 | Olympic Games | Rio de Janeiro, Brazil | 10th (h) | 4 × 100 m relay | 38.30 |
| 2017 | World Championships | London, United Kingdom | 12th (sf) | 100 m | 10.16 |
| 2017 | World Championships | London, United Kingdom | 7th | 4 × 100 m relay | 38.73 |
| 2018 | Mediterranean Games | Tarragona, Spain | 1st | 100 m | 10.10 |
| 2018 | Mediterranean Games | Tarragona, Spain | 2nd | 4 × 100 m relay | 38.50 |
| 2018 | European Championships | Berlin, Germany | 3rd | 100 m | 10.01 |
| 2018 | European Championships | Berlin, Germany | 2nd | 4 × 100 m relay | 37.98 |
| 2019 | World Relays | Yokohama, Japan | 7th | 4 × 100 m relay | 39.13 |
| 2019 | World Championships | Doha, Qatar | – | 4 × 100 m relay | DQ |
| 2021 | World Relays | Chorzów, Poland | 14th (h) | 4 × 100 m relay | 39.59 |
| 2021 | Olympic Games | Tokyo, Japan | 36th (h) | 100 m | 10.25 |
| 2021 | Olympic Games | Tokyo, Japan | – | 4 × 100 m relay | DQ |
| 2022 | Mediterranean Games | Oran, Algeria | 1st | 100 m | 10.15 |
| 2022 | Mediterranean Games | Oran, Algeria | 2nd | 4 × 100 m relay | 38.98 |
| 2022 | Islamic Solidarity Games | Konya, Turkey | 7th (sf) | 100 m | 10.10^{1} |
| 2022 | Islamic Solidarity Games | Konya, Turkey | 1st | 4 × 100 m relay | 38.74 |
| 2022 | Islamic Solidarity Games | Konya, Turkey | – | 4 × 400 m relay | DQ |
| 2022 | European Championships | Munich, Germany | – | 100 m | DQ |
| 2022 | European Championships | Munich, Germany | 7th | 4 × 100 m relay | 39.20 |

^{1}Disqualified in the final
