= Prezel Hardy =

American sprinter (born 1992)

Personal information
- Nationality: American
- Born: June 1, 1992 (age 34) Caserma Ederle, Italy

Sport
- Sport: Running
- Event: 100 metres
- College team: Texas A&M Aggies

Achievements and titles
- Personal best: 100m: 10.13 (Waco 2011)
Medal record
Men's athletics
Representing the United States
NACAC U-23 Championships
Silver medal – second place	2012 Irapuato	200 meters
World Youth Championships
Gold medal – first place	2009 Brixen	100 m

Prezel Hardy Jr. (born June 1, 1992) is an American sprinter who specializes in the 100 meters.

At the 2009 World Youth Championships in Athletics in Brixen, Italy, Hardy won the 100 meters in 10.57 in the midst of heavy rain.

Hardy attends Texas A&M University in College Station, Texas. At the 2009 Texas State high school meet he won the State 5A title in the 100 meters in 10.08 seconds, which would have bettered the World youth record of 10.23 set by Tamunosiki Atorudibo in 2002 and tied by Rynell Parson in 2007 had it not been for the wind assistance of 2.2 meters per second. However, his time made him the third fastest performer in high school history, behind only Jeffery Demps (10.01) and J-Mee Samuels (10.05w), and a new Texas state record, beating the previous record set by Henry Neal of Greenville with a time of 10.15 seconds in 1990.

He was named to the 2009 All-USA Track & Field Team by USA Today.

He lists Tyson Gay as his athletic role model.

At Ellison, Hardy is also a member of the football varsity, playing running back and wide receiver.
