= Dominik Kopeć =

Polish sprinter (born 1995)

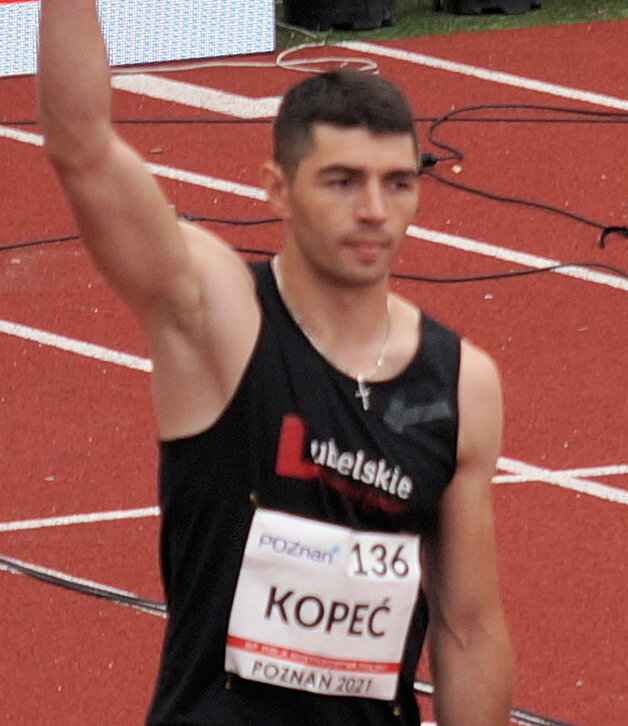
- Dominik Kopeć in 2021

Personal information
- Born: 5 March 1995 (age 31) Łuszczacz, Lublin Voivodeship, Poland
- Height: 1.79 m (5 ft 10 in)
- Weight: 79 kg (174 lb)

Sport
- Sport: Athletics
- Event: 100 metres
- Club: KS Agros Zamość
- Coached by: Andrzej Gdański (–2025); Piotr Maruszewski (2025–)
Medal record
Men's athletics
Representing Poland
European Championships
Bronze medal – third place	2022 Munich	4×100 m relay
Polish Athletics Championships
Gold medal – first place	2018 Lublin	100 m
Gold medal – first place	2018 Lublin	200 m
Gold medal – first place	2019 Radom	100 m
Gold medal – first place	2019 Radom	200 m
Gold medal – first place	2021 Poznań	100 m
Gold medal – first place	2022 Suwałki	100 m
Silver medal – second place	2017 Białystok	4×100 m relay
Silver medal – second place	2020 Włocławek	100 m
Bronze medal – third place	2017 Białystok	100 m
Bronze medal – third place	2018 Suwałki	4×100 m relay
Bronze medal – third place	2019 Radom	4×100 m relay
Polish Indoor Athletics Championships
Gold medal – first place	2022 Toruń	60 m
Silver medal – second place	2018 Toruń	60 m
Silver medal – second place	2018 Toruń	200 m
Silver medal – second place	2019 Toruń	60 m
Bronze medal – third place	2015 Toruń	4×200 m relay
Bronze medal – third place	2017 Toruń	60 m
Bronze medal – third place	2020 Toruń	60 m

Dominik Kopeć (pronounced [ˈkɔpɛt͡ɕ]; born 5 March 1995) is a Polish sprinter. He finished fifth at the 2015 European U23 Championships in Tallinn.

== International competitions ==
Year	Competition	Venue	Position	Event	Notes
Representing Poland
2014	World Junior Championships	Eugene, United States	13th (h)	4 × 100 m relay	40.68
2015	European U23 Championships	Tallinn, Estonia	5th	100 m	10.50
2015	European U23 Championships	Tallinn, Estonia	–	4 × 100 m relay	DQ
2017	World Relays	Nassau, Bahamas	17th (h)	4 × 100 m relay	39.84
2017	European U23 Championships	Bydgoszcz, Poland	18th (sf)	100 m	10.57
2017	European U23 Championships	Bydgoszcz, Poland	6th	4 × 100 m relay	40.11
2018	World Cup	London, United Kingdom	7th	4 × 100 m relay	38.91
2018	European Championships	Berlin, Germany	12th (sf)	100 m	10.29
2018	European Championships	Berlin, Germany	–	4 × 100 m relay	DQ
2019	World Relays	Yokohama, Japan	–	4 × 100 m relay	DNF
2021	European Indoor Championships	Toruń, Poland	23rd (sf)	60 m	6.69
2021	World Relays	Chorzów, Poland	12th (h)	4 × 100 m relay	39.34
2021	World Relays	Chorzów, Poland	–	4 × 200 m relay	DNF
2022	European Championships	Munich, Germany	15th (sf)	100 m	10.23
2022	European Championships	Munich, Germany	3rd	4 × 100 m relay	38.15
2023	European Indoor Championships	Istanbul, Turkey	4th	60 m	6.53
2023	World Championships	Budapest, Hungary	18th (sf)	100 m	10.15
2023	World Championships	Budapest, Hungary	–	4 × 100 m relay	DNF
2024	European Championships	Rome, Italy	12th (sf)	100 m	10.28
2024	European Championships	Rome, Italy	6th (h)	4 × 100 m relay	38.67^{1}
2025	World Championships	Tokyo, Japan	13th (h)	4 × 100 m relay	38.59
2026	World Indoor Championships	Toruń, Poland	14th (sf)	60 m	6.60
2026	European Championships	Birmingham, United Kingdom	5th	100 m	10.29
2026	European Championships	Birmingham, United Kingdom	5th	4 × 100 m relay	39.18

^{1}Did not finish in the final

== Personal bests ==
Outdoor

- 100 metres – 10.05 (+0.1 m/s, Dessau-Rosslau 2023)
- 200 metres – 20.59 (+0.9 m/s, Szczecin 2018)

Indoor

- 60 metres – 6.53 (Istanbul 2023)
- 200 metres – 21.17 (Toruń 2018)
