= Guy-Elphège Anouman =

French sprinter

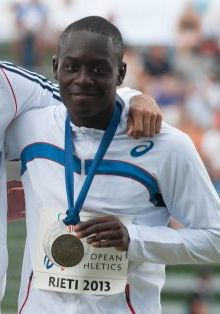
- Anouman at the 2013 European Junior Championships.

Personal information
- Born: 19 May 1994 (age 32) La Garenne-Colombes, France
- Height: 177 cm (5 ft 10 in)
- Weight: 75 kg (165 lb)

Sport
- Country: France
- Sport: Athletics (running)
- Events: 100 metres, 200 metres

Achievements and titles
- Personal bests: 100m: 10.42 (2013); 200m: 21.05 (2013)
Medal record
European U23 Championships
Gold medal – first place	2015 Tallinn	4 × 100 m relay
Bronze medal – third place	2015 Tallinn	100 m

Guy-Elphège Anouman (born 13 June 1994) is a French sprinter who specialises in the 100 and 200 metres.

In 2011, Amouman established a new World Youth Best in the 200 m (indoor).

Anouman competed in the 200 metres at the 2010 Summer Youth Olympics in Singapore.
