= Xu Zhouzheng =

Chinese sprinter

Personal information
- Nationality: Chinese
- Born: 26 December 1995 (age 30)

Sport
- Sport: Athletics
- Event: Sprinting

Xu Zhouzheng (born 26 December 1995) is a Chinese athlete who won several medals in 100m and 4 × 100 m relays.

== Career ==
He competed in the men's 100 metres event at the 2019 World Athletics Championships.
