= Rynell Parson =

American sprinter (born 1990)

Personal information
- Nationality: American
- Born: November 7, 1990 (age 35) San Antonio, Texas
- Height: 5 ft 8 in (173 cm)

Sport
- Sport: Running
- College team: LSU Tigers

Achievements and titles
- Personal bests: 100m: 10.23 (Indianapolis 2007); 200m: 21.05 (Norfolk 2006)

Rynell Deon Parson (born July 11, 1990) is an American sprinter who specializes in the 100 meters. A native of San Antonio, Texas, Parson attended John Paul Stevens High School. He graduated from Louisiana State University in 2013 with a degree in sport administration.
