= Derick Silva =

Brazilian sprinter (born 1998)

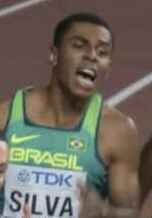
- Silva in 2019

Personal information
- Full name: Derick de Souza da Silva
- Born: 23 April 1998 (age 28) Rio de Janeiro, Brazil

Sport
- Sport: Athletics
- Events: 100 metres; 200 metres
Medal record
Men's athletics
Representing Brazil
World Relays
Gold medal – first place	2019 Yokohama	4×100 m relay
Pan American Games
Gold medal – first place	2019 Lima	4×100 m relay
World Youth Championships in Athletics
Silver medal – second place	2015 Cali	100 m

Derick de Souza da Silva (born 23 April 1998) is a Brazilian track and field athlete who specializes in sprint. Representing Brazil at the 2019 World Athletics Championships, he was part of Brazil's team that qualified to the final in men's 4 × 100 metres relay. He competed at the 2020 Summer Olympics.

== Career ==
Silva was part of the Brazilian men's 4 × 100 metres relay team that won the 2019 IAAF World Relays in Yokohama. Later that year, he also won gold in the 4 × 100 metres relay at the 2019 Pan American Games, where Brazil finished in 38.27 seconds.

At the 2019 World Athletics Championships in Doha, Silva ran the third leg of Brazil's 4 × 100 metres relay team alongside Rodrigo do Nascimento, Vitor Hugo dos Santos and Paulo André Camilo. The quartet finished fourth in the final in 37.72 seconds, setting a Brazilian and South American record.

Silva later represented Brazil at the 2020 Summer Olympics in Tokyo. He competed in the men's 4 × 100 metres relay with Rodrigo do Nascimento, Felipe Bardi and Paulo André Camilo. The Brazilian team recorded 38.34 seconds in the heats and did not advance to the final.

== Personal bests ==
- 100 m: 10.10 (wind: +0.2 m/s) – (Spain) Guadalajara, 6 Jul 2018
- 200 m: 20.23 (wind: +1.6 m/s) – (United States) Auburn, 21 Apr 2018
- 4 × 100 m relay: 37.72 – (Qatar) Doha, 5 Oct 2019
