= Mouhamadou Fall =

French sprinter (born 1992)

Personal information
- Full name: Mouhamadou Fall N’dao
- Born: 25 February 1992 (age 34) Beaumont-sur-Oise, France
- Height: 192 cm (6 ft 4 in)
- Weight: 87 kg (192 lb)

Sport
- Country: France
- Sport: Athletics
- Event: Sprint
- Coached by: Mickaël Hanany

Achievements and titles
- Personal bests: 60 meters: 6.60 s 100 meters: 10.04 s 200 meters: 20.34 s

Mouhamadou Fall (born 25 February 1992) is a French sprinter. He competed in the 4×100 metres relay at the 2020 Summer Olympics.

Fall had been serving bans for anti-doping rule violations since April 2024 and is due to become eligible again in July 2026.

== Career ==
He finished third at the 2019 European Team Championships and competed at the 2019 World Championships without reaching the final. He also became French champion in 2019.

In the 4 × 100 metres relay he finished fourth at the 2018 European Championships and fifth at the 2019 IAAF World Relays.

His personal best times are 10.12 seconds in the 100 metres, achieved in July 2019 in Saint-Etienne; and 20.34 seconds in the 200 metres, achieved in July 2019 in Saint-Etienne.

Fall was coached by Mickaël Hanany.

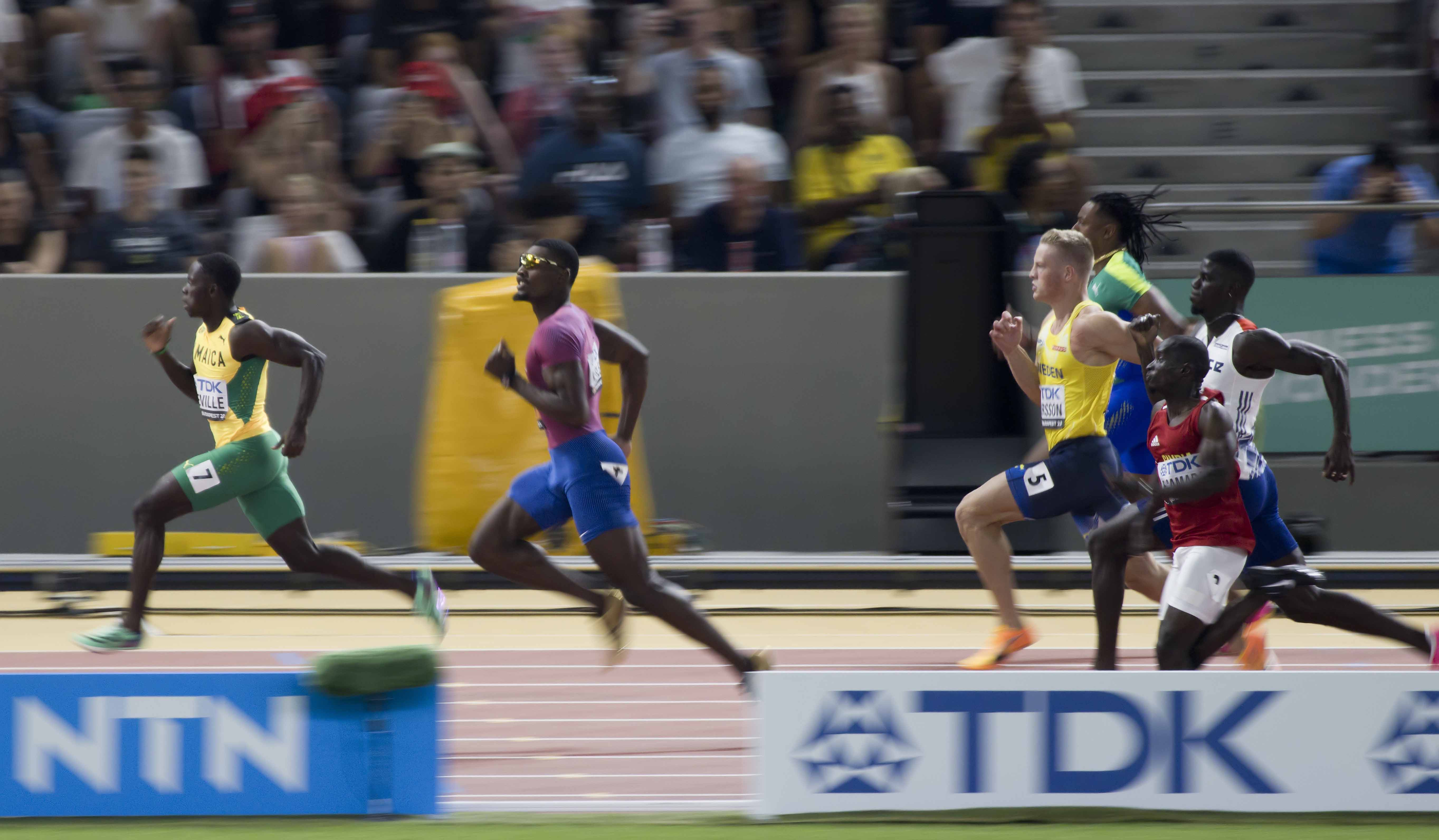
Fall (far right) in 100m heat at 2023 World Championships

Fall served a nine-month ban from April 2024 to January 2025 for an anti-doping rule violation after testing positive for heptaminol in July 2023. In September 2024, Fall was issued with an 18-month ban set to expire in July 2026 for a second anti-doping rule violation for whereabouts failures (missed tests or filing omissions). The two sanctions also resulted in the Fall's disqualification of dozens of races from June 2022 to April 2024.

Fall competed in the 2026 Enhanced Games. In response to Fall’s announcement of intent to compete in the event, the French Anti-Doping Agency stated it would test participating French athletes and enforce sanctions for banned substances.

== Personal life ==
Born in Beaumont-sur-Oise, France, Fall is of Senegalese descent.
