= Emil Ibrahimov =

Ukrainian sprinter

Personal information
- Born: 1 February 1990 (age 35)

Sport
- Country: Ukraine
- Sport: Track and field
- Event(s): 100 metres 4 × 100 metres relay

Emil Yusyrovych Ibrahimov (Ukrainian: Еміль Юсирович Ібрагімов; born 1 February 1990) is a Ukrainian sprinter.

Since 2014, he established the National record on 4 x 100 m with 38.53, with teammates Serhiy Smelyk, Ihor Bodrov and Vitaliy Korzh, winning final B at 2014 IAAF World Relays. His personal best on 100 m is 10.30, in 2016 in Erzurum. He won the National title on 200 m in 2017.
