= Chris Garia =

Dutch sprinter and baseball player (born 1992)

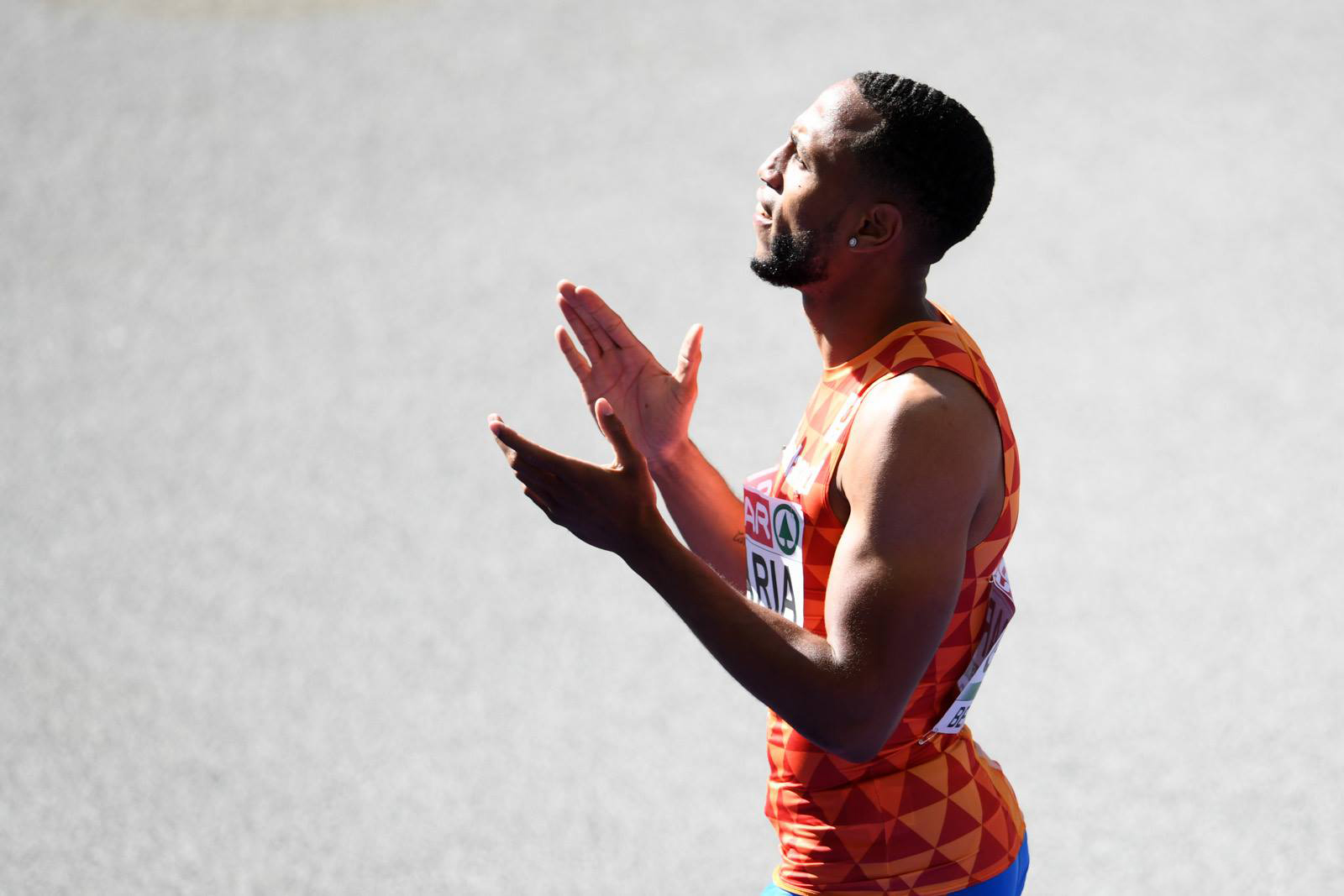
- Garia at the 2018 European Championships

Personal information
- Full name: Christopher George Paul Garia
- Nationality: Netherlands
- Born: 16 December 1992 (age 33) Willemstad, Netherlands Antilles

Sport
- Sport: Running
- Event(s): 100 metres, 200 metres

Achievements and titles
- Personal bests: 60 m: 6.70; 100 m: 10.22; 200 m: 20.68

Christopher George Paul Garia (born 16 December 1992) is a Dutch sprinter and former professional baseball outfielder from Curaçao. Garia won the 60 metres at the 2018 Dutch National Indoor Championships in a time of 6.70 seconds. He was also a member of the Dutch national baseball team before completing his transformation to sprinter.

== Baseball career ==
Chris Garia
- Outfielder
- Born: 16 December 1992 (age 33); Willemstad, Netherlands Antilles
- Bats: Both Throws: Right
- Stats at Baseball Reference
Medals
Men's baseball
Representing Netherlands
European Baseball Championship
Gold medal – first place	2016 Hoofddorp	Team
France International Baseball Tournament
Gold medal – first place	2016 Sénart	Team

=== Texas Rangers ===
On 28 May 2010, Garia signed with the Texas Rangers as an international free agent. He spent his first two professional seasons with the Dominican Summer League Rangers, hitting .205 in 60 games in 2010, and batting .315 over 61 contests in 2011. Garia played in 47 games for the Low-A Spokane Indians in 2012, slashing .246/.319/.328 with one home run, 16 RBI, and 18 stolen bases.

Garia split the 2013 season between Spokane and the Single-A Hickory Crawdads, posting a .218/.261/.322 batting line with four home runs, 25 RBI, and 24 stolen bases across 68 total appearances. He made 101 appearances for the High-A Myrtle Beach Pelicans during the 2014 campaign, slashing .284/.343/.387 with four home runs, 24 RBI, and a career-high 45 stolen bases.

Garia split the 2015 season between the High-A High Desert Mavericks, Double-A Frisco RoughRiders, and Triple-A Round Rock Express, hitting a combined .283/.330/.451 with eight home runs, 46 RBI, and 27 stolen bases. In 2016, he played in 47 games split between Hickory and Frisco, slashing .213/.271/.354 with four home runs, 13 RBI, and 12 stolen bases. Garia was released by the Rangers organization on 27 June 2016.

=== Vaessen Pioniers ===
On 30 July 2016, Garia signed with the Vaessen Pioniers of the Honkbal Hoofdklasse. In five games for the team, Garia went 6-for-14 (.429) with two RBI and three stolen bases.

=== Lincoln Saltdogs ===
On 18 November 2016, Garia signed with the Lincoln Saltdogs of the American Association of Independent Professional Baseball. He played in five games for the Saltdogs in 2017, going 1-for-18 (.056) with one stolen base. Garia was released by Lincoln on 29 May 2017.

=== Hoofddorp Pioniers ===
Garia subsequently played in one game for the Hoofddorp Pioniers of the Honkbal Hoofdklasse, going 0-for-4 with one strikeout; the contest proved to be his final professional baseball game.

=== International career ===
Garia was also selected for the Netherlands national baseball team for the 2016 France International Baseball Tournament, the 2016 European Baseball Championship, the exhibition games against Japan in 2016 and the training camp in the United States in 2017.

On 25 August 2016, Garia was selected for the 2016 France International Baseball Tournament. On 7 September, he was selected for the 2016 European Baseball Championship. On 26 October, Garia was selected for the exhibition games against Japan.

On 7 February 2017, Garia was selected for the training camp in the United States. On 9 February, he was selected for the 2017 World Baseball Classic, but on 26 February, he cancelled.
