= CJ Ujah =

British sprinter

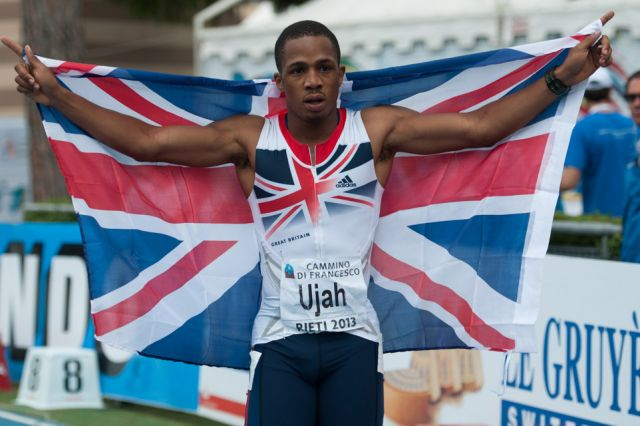
- Chijindu Ujah in 2013

Personal information
- Nationality: British (English)
- Born: 5 March 1994 (age 32) Ponders End, Enfield, London, England
- Education: Bishop Stopford's School; Sir George Monoux College; Middlesex University
- Height: 1.80 m (5 ft 11 in)
- Weight: 75 kg (165 lb)

Sport
- Sport: Men's athletics
- Event: Sprints
- Club: Enfield and Haringey AC

Achievements and titles
- Personal best: 100 m: 9.96 (Hengelo 2014)
Medal record
Representing Great Britain
Olympic Games
Disqualified	2020 Tokyo	4 × 100 m relay
World Championships
Gold medal – first place	2017 London	4 × 100 m relay
Diamond League
First place	2017 Zurich	100 m
European Athletics Championships
Gold medal – first place	2016 Amsterdam	4 × 100 m relay
Gold medal – first place	2018 Berlin	4 × 100 m relay
Men's junior athletics
Representing Great Britain
European Athletics Junior Championships
Gold medal – first place	2013 Rieti	100 m
Representing England
Commonwealth Youth Games
Silver medal – second place	2011 Douglas	100 m
Silver medal – second place	2011 Douglas	4 × 100 m relay

Chijindu Andre E. O. Ujah (born 5 March 1994) is a British athlete, specializing as a sprinter. The lead-off runner of the Great Britain 4 × 100 metres relay team that won both the World title in 2017 and the European title in 2016 and 2018, he also won the title in the 100 metres at the 2017 Diamond League final.

On 18 February 2022, it was announced that Ujah and his teammates Zharnel Hughes, Nethaneel Mitchell-Blake, and Richard Kilty would be stripped of their 4 × 100 metres relay 2020 Summer Olympics silver medals after Court of Arbitration for Sport found Ujah guilty of a doping violation.

== Early life and education ==
Chijindu Ujah was born in Enfield, London into a family who are originally from Nigeria. He grew up in Enfield and has one older sibling. He attended St. Matthew's CE Primary School and Bishop Stopford's School alongside his brother. Chijindu went on to study at Sir George Monoux College, a sixth form college in Walthamstow. He later graduated with a degree in sports science from Middlesex University.

== Career ==
Ujah is the fifth British sprinter to break 10 seconds for the 100 metres, and the youngest to do so, as of June 2014 he is ranked first on the all-time European under-20 list, and third on both the all-time British list and the all-time European under-23 list for the event with a fastest time of 9.96 (with a +1.4 tailwind), achieved at Hengelo, Netherlands on 8 June 2014.

He is coached by Jonas Tawiah-Dodoo.

In 2013, he became the European Junior Champion in the 100 m.

At youth level, Ujah won the silver medal over 100 metres at the 2011 Commonwealth Youth Games He also finished 8th in the IAAF World Youth Games 100 m. In 2012, he came 6th in the IAAF World Junior Championships 100 m.

On 14 February 2015, Chijindu Ujah won the Sainsbury's Indoor British Championships 60 m with a time of 6.57 seconds.

At the 2016 Summer Olympics from Rio de Janeiro, he failed to make the final of the 100 metres by 0.01 seconds.

He ran the first leg in the 4 × 100 metres relay for Great Britain, the gold medal-winning team at the 2017 World Championships in London on 12 August. Two weeks later, he won his first global individual title, winning the 2017 IAAF Diamond League title over 100 metres in 9.97 seconds.

=== Doping ban ===
At the Tokyo 2020 Summer Olympics, he was awarded a silver medal for the 4 × 100 men's relay event. He was later provisionally suspended for an alleged doping violation after his doping test showed the presence of a prohibited substance S-23 and Enobosarm. On 14 September 2021 it was announced that his 'B' sample had also tested positive, confirming the initial test and "almost certainly" resulting in the relay team being disqualified and losing their medals. On 18 February 2022, having not appealed the findings of the test, the Court of Arbitration for Sport disqualified the British relay team with the silver medals being returned and ultimately reallocated to the Canadian team. On 10 October 2022, Ujah was banned for 22 months, backdated to 6 August 2021 for unintentional use of prohibited substances by the AIU and the World Anti-Doping Agency resulting from inadequte caution after buying supplements over the internet.
