= Stuart Dutamby =

French sprinter

Personal information
- Born: 24 April 1994 (age 32) Saint-Germain-en-Laye, France
- Height: 176 cm (5 ft 9 in)
- Weight: 74 kg (163 lb)

Sport
- Country: France
- Sport: Athletics
- Club: Lille Métropole Athlétisme (2012–2021); Athlétique Club Paris-Joinville (2024)
- Coached by: Boukhoubza Jalile (2012–2014); Ontanon Guy (2014–2016); Demoniere Dimitri (2016–2024)
Medal record
European Championships
| Silver medal – second place | 2016 Amsterdam | 4 x 100 m relay |

Stuart Dutamby (born 24 April 1994) is a French sprinter. He competed in the men's 4 × 100 metres relay at the 2016 Summer Olympics.
