= Marvin René =

French sprinter

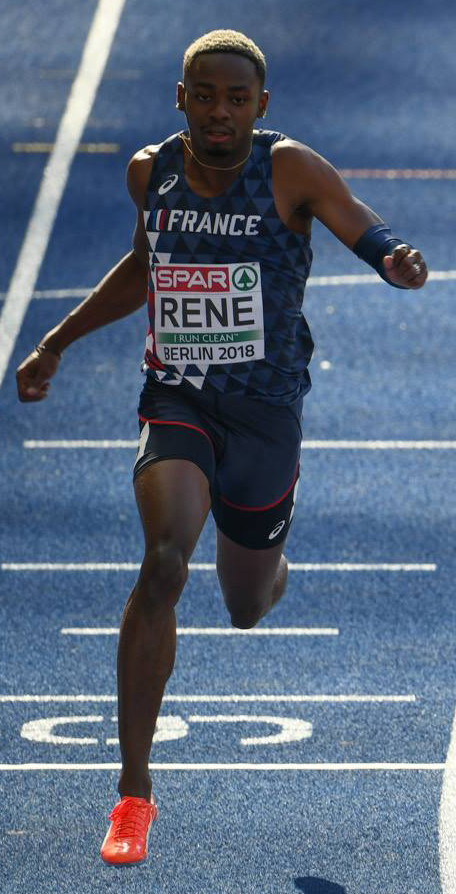
- René in 2018

Personal information
- Born: 11 April 1995 (age 31) Cayenne, French Guiana
- Height: 180 cm (5 ft 11 in)
- Weight: 68 kg (150 lb)

Sport
- Country: France
- Sport: Athletics

Marvin René (born 11 April 1995) is a French sprinter. He competed in the men's 4 × 100 metres relay at the 2016 Summer Olympics.
