= 2013 European Athletics U23 Championships – Men's 100 metres =

The Men's 100 metres event at the 2013 European Athletics U23 Championships was held in Tampere, Finland, at Ratina Stadium on 11 and 12 July.

== Medalists ==
Gold	Adam Gemili; United Kingdom
Silver	Deji Tobais; United Kingdom
Bronze	Hensley Paulina; Netherlands

== Results ==
=== Final ===
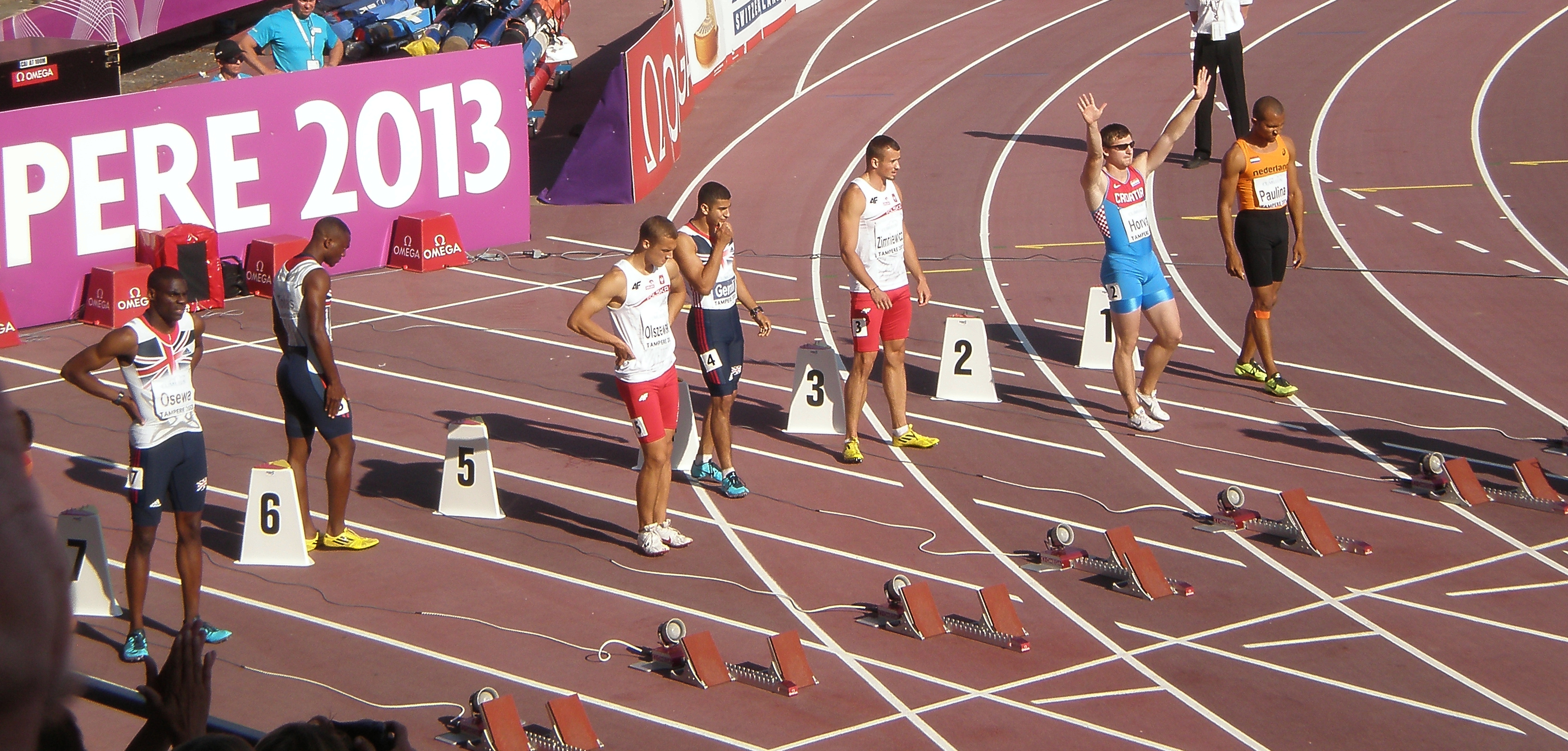
Presentation of the finalists

12 July 2013 / 18:10
Wind: -0.3 m/s

Rank	Name	Nationality	Lane	Reaction Time	Time	Notes
1st place, gold medalist(s)	Adam Gemili	United Kingdom	4	0.178	10.20	
2nd place, silver medalist(s)	Deji Tobais	United Kingdom	6	0.141	10.29	
3rd place, bronze medalist(s)	Hensley Paulina	Netherlands	1	0.134	10.48	PB
4	Remigiusz Olszewski	Poland	5	0.154	10.49	
5	Grzegorz Zimniewicz	Poland	3	0.168	10.55	
6	Eduard Viles	Spain	8	0.124	10.55	
7	Samuel Osewa	United Kingdom	7	0.163	10.58	
8	Dario Horvat	Croatia	2	0.136	10.61	

=== Semifinals ===
Qualified: First 3 in each heat (Q) and 2 best performers (q) advance to the Final

==== Summary ====
Rank	Name	Nationality	Time	Notes
1	Adam Gemili	United Kingdom	10.18	Q SB
2	Deji Tobais	United Kingdom	10.27	Q PB
3	Remigiusz Olszewski	Poland	10.49	Q
4	Grzegorz Zimniewicz	Poland	10.52	Q
5	Eduard Viles	Spain	10.53	Q
6	Samuel Osewa	United Kingdom	10.54	Q
6	Hensley Paulina	Netherlands	10.54	q
8	Dario Horvat	Croatia	10.55	q
9	Patrick Domogala	Germany	10.57	
10	Aurel Manga	France	10.57	
11	Boyan Petrov	Bulgaria	10.60	
12	Diogo Antunes	Portugal	10.62	
13	Massimiliano Ferraro	Italy	10.63	
14	Eetu Rantala	Finland	10.69	
15	Petar Kremenski	Bulgaria	10.70	
	Francesco Basciani	Italy	DQ	R 163.3a

==== Details ====
===== Semifinal 1 =====
11 July 2013 / 18:30 Wind: -0.5 m/s

Rank	Name	Nationality	Lane	Reaction Time	Time	Notes
1	Adam Gemili	United Kingdom	6	0.177	10.18	Q SB
2	Grzegorz Zimniewicz	Poland	2	0.177	10.52	Q
3	Samuel Osewa	United Kingdom	5	0.173	10.54	Q
4	Dario Horvat	Croatia	3	0.163	10.55	q
5	Patrick Domogala	Germany	8	0.128	10.57	
6	Aurel Manga	France	7	0.180	10.57	
7	Boyan Petrov	Bulgaria	1	0.160	10.60	
8	Massimiliano Ferraro	Italy	4	0.163	10.63	

===== Semifinal 2 =====
11 July 2013 / 18:37 Wind: -1.1 m/s

Rank	Name	Nationality	Lane	Reaction Time	Time	Notes
1	Deji Tobais	United Kingdom	5	0.149	10.27	Q PB
2	Remigiusz Olszewski	Poland	3	0.153	10.49	Q
3	Eduard Viles	Spain	4	0.148	10.53	Q
4	Hensley Paulina	Netherlands	7	0.140	10.54	q
5	Diogo Antunes	Portugal	8	0.145	10.62	
6	Eetu Rantala	Finland	1	0.181	10.69	
7	Petar Kremenski	Bulgaria	2	0.175	10.70	
	Francesco Basciani	Italy	6	0.167	DQ	R 163.3a

=== Heats ===
Qualified: First 3 in each heat (Q) and 4 best performers (q) advance to the Semifinals

==== Summary ====
Rank	Name	Nationality	Time	Notes
1	Adam Gemili	United Kingdom	10.42	Q
2	Deji Tobais	United Kingdom	10.47	Q
3	Francesco Basciani	Italy	10.48	Q
4	Dario Horvat	Croatia	10.49	Q
5	Samuel Osewa	United Kingdom	10.52	Q
6	Aurel Manga	France	10.54	Q
7	Eduard Viles	Spain	10.55	Q
8	Remigiusz Olszewski	Poland	10.57	Q
8	Grzegorz Zimniewicz	Poland	10.57	q
10	Hensley Paulina	Netherlands	10.59	Q
11	Diogo Antunes	Portugal	10.61	Q
11	Massimiliano Ferraro	Italy	10.61	Q
13	Eetu Rantala	Finland	10.70	q
14	Patrick Domogala	Germany	10.71	Q
15	Petar Kremenski	Bulgaria	10.71	q
16	Boyan Petrov	Bulgaria	10.73	q
17	Roy Schmidt	Germany	10.74	
18	Lukas Gaudutis	Lithuania	10.77	
18	Ognyan Ognyanov	Bulgaria	10.77	
18	David Sennung	Sweden	10.77	
21	Iordánis Roussákis	Greece	10.78	
22	Bogdan Madaras	Romania	10.79	
23	Federico Cattaneo	Italy	10.85	
24	Kostas Skrabulis	Lithuania	10.85	
25	Andrej Doričić	Croatia	10.87	
25	Richard Pulst	Estonia	10.87	
27	Nikolai Bjerkan	Norway	10.89	
28	Umutcan Emektaş	Turkey	10.90	
29	Dayan Aviv	Israel	10.96	
30	Irakli Ashortia	Georgia	11.02	
31	António Brandão	Portugal	11.11	
31	Steve Camilleri	Malta	11.11	

==== Details ====
===== Heat 1 =====
11 July 2013 / 10:50 Wind: -1.3 m/s

Rank	Name	Nationality	Lane	Reaction Time	Time	Notes
1	Deji Tobais	United Kingdom	2	0.214	10.47	Q
2	Massimiliano Ferraro	Italy	5	0.182	10.61	Q
3	Patrick Domogala	Germany	4	0.143	10.71	Q
4	Petar Kremenski	Bulgaria	3	0.159	10.71	q
5	Lukas Gaudutis	Lithuania	1	0.148	10.77	
6	David Sennung	Sweden	8	0.139	10.77	
7	Nikolai Bjerkan	Norway	6	0.226	10.89	
8	Irakli Ashortia	Georgia	7	0.140	11.02	

===== Heat 2 =====
11 July 2013 / 10:58 Wind: -1.3 m/s

Rank	Name	Nationality	Lane	Reaction Time	Time	Notes
1	Dario Horvat	Croatia	4	0.146	10.49	Q
2	Eduard Viles	Spain	2	0.147	10.55	Q
3	Diogo Antunes	Portugal	7	0.124	10.61	Q
4	Boyan Petrov	Bulgaria	1	0.167	10.73	q
5	Iordánis Roussákis	Greece	8	0.199	10.78	
6	Bogdan Madaras	Romania	5	0.166	10.79	
7	Umutcan Emektaş	Turkey	3	0.173	10.90	
8	Dayan Aviv	Israel	6	0.180	10.96	

===== Heat 3 =====
11 July 2013 / 11:06 Wind: -0.2 m/s

Rank	Name	Nationality	Lane	Reaction Time	Time	Notes
1	Francesco Basciani	Italy	2	0.157	10.48	Q
2	Samuel Osewa	United Kingdom	1	0.156	10.52	Q
3	Aurel Manga	France	7	0.185	10.54	Q
4	Grzegorz Zimniewicz	Poland	8	0.159	10.57	q
5	Eetu Rantala	Finland	5	0.171	10.70	q
6	Ognyan Ognyanov	Bulgaria	6	0.179	10.77	
7	Richard Pulst	Estonia	4	0.161	10.87	
8	António Brandão	Portugal	3	0.180	11.11	

===== Heat 4 =====
11 July 2013 / 11:14 Wind: -0.9 m/s

Rank	Name	Nationality	Lane	Reaction Time	Time	Notes
1	Adam Gemili	United Kingdom	5	0.180	10.42	Q
2	Remigiusz Olszewski	Poland	2	0.177	10.57	Q
3	Hensley Paulina	Netherlands	3	0.138	10.59	Q
4	Roy Schmidt	Germany	8	0.136	10.74	
5	Federico Cattaneo	Italy	6	0.158	10.85	
6	Kostas Skrabulis	Lithuania	7	0.148	10.85	
7	Andrej Doričić	Croatia	1	0.144	10.87	
8	Steve Camilleri	Malta	4	0.139	11.11	

== Participation ==
According to an unofficial count, 32 athletes from 21 countries participated in the event.

- Bulgaria (3)
- Croatia (2)
- Estonia (1)
- Finland (1)
- France (1)
- Georgia (1)
- Germany (2)
- Greece (1)
- Israel (1)
- Italy (3)
- Lithuania (2)
- Malta (1)
- Netherlands (1)
- Norway (1)
- Poland (2)
- Portugal (2)
- Romania (1)
- Spain (1)
- Sweden (1)
- Turkey (1)
- United Kingdom (3)
