= Athletics at the 2017 Summer Universiade – Men's 100 metres =

The men's 100 metres event at the 2017 Summer Universiade was held on 23 and 24 August at the Taipei Municipal Stadium.

== Medalists ==
| Gold | Silver | Bronze |
|---|---|---|
| Yang Chun-han; Chinese Taipei | Thando Roto; South Africa | Cameron Burrell; United States |

== Results ==
=== Heats ===
Qualification: First 3 in each heat (Q) and next 2 fastest (q) qualified for the quarterfinals.

Wind:
Heat 1: +0.1 m/s, Heat 2: -0.4 m/s, Heat 3: +0.3 m/s, Heat 4: -1.3 m/s, Heat 5: -0.1 m/s
Heat 6: -0.1 m/s, Heat 7: -0.7 m/s, Heat 8: +1.1 m/s, Heat 9: +1.4 m/s, Heat 10: -0.9 m/s

| Rank | Heat | Name | Nationality | Time | Notes |
|---|---|---|---|---|---|
| 1 | 10 | Emmanuel Yeboah | Ghana | 10.25 | Q, PB |
| 2 | 3 | LeShon Collins | United States | 10.30 | Q |
| 3 | 4 | Shuhei Tada | Japan | 10.33 | Q |
| 3 | 10 | Yang Chun-han | Chinese Taipei | 10.33 | Q |
| 5 | 5 | Moriba Morain | Trinidad and Tobago | 10.34 | Q |
| 6 | 9 | Joseph Millar | New Zealand | 10.35 | Q |
| 7 | 4 | Heber Gallegos | Mexico | 10.41 | Q |
| 7 | 9 | Jiang Hengnan | China | 10.41 | Q |
| 9 | 1 | Cameron Burrell | United States | 10.43 | Q |
| 9 | 7 | Tyquendo Tracey | Jamaica | 10.43 | Q |
| 11 | 9 | Imri Persiado | Israel | 10.44 | Q |
| 12 | 3 | Juan Carlos Alanis | Mexico | 10.47 | Q |
| 13 | 2 | Skander Djamil Athmani | Algeria | 10.49 | Q |
| 13 | 10 | Samuel Osewa | Great Britain | 10.49 | Q |
| 15 | 3 | Zdeněk Stromšík | Czech Republic | 10.50 | Q |
| 16 | 1 | Yusuke Tanaka | Japan | 10.51 | Q |
| 16 | 2 | Thando Roto | South Africa | 10.51 | Q |
| 16 | 6 | Diogo Antunes | Portugal | 10.51 | Q |
| 16 | 8 | Ján Volko | Slovakia | 10.51 | Q |
| 20 | 9 | Pascal Mancini | Switzerland | 10.53 | q |
| 21 | 8 | Eetu Rantala | Finland | 10.55 | Q, SB |
| 21 | 3 | Kostas Skrabulis | Lithuania | 10.55 | q |
| 23 | 7 | Gabriel Constantino | Brazil | 10.56 | Q |
| 24 | 8 | Shadrack Opoku Agyemang | Ghana | 10.57 | Q |
| 25 | 10 | Oluwasegun Makinde | Canada | 10.58 | |
| 26 | 6 | James Linde | Canada | 10.59 | Q |
| 26 | 8 | Florian Clivaz | Switzerland | 10.59 | |
| 28 | 4 | Luca Antonio Cassano | Italy | 10.60 | Q |
| 28 | 10 | Rohan Browning | Australia | 10.60 | |
| 30 | 5 | Muhammad Aqil Yasmin | Malaysia | 10.61 | Q, PB |
| 30 | 7 | Vladislav Grigoryev | Kazakhstan | 10.61 | Q |
| 32 | 5 | Markus Fuchs | Austria | 10.62 | Q |
| 33 | 1 | Dominik Záleský | Czech Republic | 10.63 | Q |
| 34 | 2 | Marcus Lawler | Ireland | 10.64 | Q |
| 35 | 5 | Przemysław Słowikowski | Poland | 10.65 | |
| 36 | 2 | Jin Su Jung | Australia | 10.67 | |
| 37 | 7 | Šimon Bujna | Slovakia | 10.70 | |
| 38 | 4 | Pius Adome | Uganda | 10.73 | |
| 38 | 5 | Federico Cattaneo | Italy | 10.73 | |
| 40 | 4 | İzzet Safer | Turkey | 10.74 | |
| 40 | 7 | Ditiro Sebele | Botswana | 10.74 | |
| 42 | 2 | Matías Robledo | Argentina | 10.75 | |
| 43 | 3 | Gerren Muwishi | Zimbabwe | 10.76 | |
| 43 | 6 | Eryk Hampel | Poland | 10.76 | Q |
| 43 | 9 | Christophe Boulos | Lebanon | 10.76 | |
| 46 | 4 | Ugnius Savickas | Lithuania | 10.81 | |
| 46 | 4 | Vyacheslav Zems | Kazakhstan | 10.81 | |
| 48 | 2 | Ville Myllymäki | Finland | 10.84 | |
| 48 | 10 | Chan Yan Lam | Hong Kong | 10.84 | PB |
| 50 | 1 | Lee Ji-woo | South Korea | 10.86 | |
| 50 | 3 | Jorge Caracassis | Argentina | 10.86 | |
| 52 | 1 | Micah Ballantyne | Trinidad and Tobago | 10.87 | |
| 53 | 7 | Jan Kramberger | Slovenia | 10.91 | |
| 53 | 9 | Benjamin Gabrielsen | Denmark | 10.91 | SB |
| 55 | 8 | Rebeilwe Thwanyane | Botswana | 10.92 | |
| 56 | 1 | Vơ Ngọc Huy | Vietnam | 10.94 | |
| 56 | 10 | Edgar Silwimba | Zambia | 10.94 | |
| 58 | 7 | Ushe Shava | Zimbabwe | 10.99 | |
| 59 | 6 | Wan Hin Chung | Hong Kong | 11.01 | |
| 60 | 3 | Josef Norales | Honduras | 11.03 | |
| 60 | 8 | Mohamed Sahid Othman | Sierra Leone | 11.03 | |
| 62 | 1 | Benele Simphiwe Dlamini | Swaziland | 11.06 | PB |
| 63 | 6 | Tan Zong Yang | Singapore | 11.08 | |
| 63 | 10 | Aleksa Kijanović | Serbia | 11.08 | |
| 65 | 9 | Ali Rashid Al-Marjabi | Oman | 11.14 | |
| 66 | 2 | Hallgeir Martinsen | Norway | 11.15 | |
| 66 | 5 | Enej Vrhunec | Slovenia | 11.15 | |
| 66 | 7 | Prasha Rizki Kusumawarni | Indonesia | 11.15 | |
| 69 | 1 | Khereng Nelson Khereng | Lesotho | 11.17 | |
| 70 | 3 | Sean Michael Kaufman | Philippines | 11.18 | |
| 71 | 2 | Kavindu Araliya Kottahachchi | Sri Lanka | 11.19 | |
| 72 | 5 | Ali Abdoulaye Yataga | Niger | 11.22 | |
| 73 | 4 | Abdullah Mohammed Al-Shuqayfi | Saudi Arabia | 11.29 | |
| 74 | 4 | Tang Cho Hin | Macau | 11.32 | |
| 75 | 6 | Francis Oketayot | Uganda | 11.33 | |
| 76 | 6 | Jose Mariolla Ramananjatovo | Madagascar | 11.39 | |
| 77 | 1 | Rihards Parandjuks | Latvia | 11.51 | |
| 78 | 6 | Taratibu Machak Hozza | Tanzania | 11.55 | =PB |
| 79 | 2 | Go Yuhei | Philippines | 11.61 | |
| 80 | 7 | Steve Mendiola Jr. | Federated States of Micronesia | 11.78 | SB |
| 81 | 6 | Dan Kiviasi Asamba | Kenya | 21.42 | |
| | 8 | Ferdinand Omany Omurwa | Kenya | DNF | |
| | 3 | Saleh Hussain Al-Moselem | Saudi Arabia | DQ | R162.7 |
| | 5 | Owen Adonis | Guyana | DNS | |
| | 5 | Krishna Chhetri | Nepal | DNS | |
| | 8 | Fidel Nguema | Equatorial Guinea | DNS | |
| | 8 | Mellitus Ugwuoke | Nigeria | DNS | |
| | 9 | Chukwudike Harry | Nigeria | DNS | |

=== Quarterfinals ===
Qualification: First 3 in each heat (Q) and the next 4 fastest (q) qualified for the semifinals.

Wind:
Heat 1: +0.4 m/s, Heat 2: -0.4 m/s, Heat 3: 0.0 m/s, Heat 4: -0.1 m/s

| Rank | Heat | Name | Nationality | Time | Notes |
|---|---|---|---|---|---|
| 1 | 3 | Shuhei Tada | Japan | 10.29 | Q |
| 2 | 2 | Ján Volko | Slovakia | 10.31 | Q |
| 2 | 3 | Yang Chun-han | Chinese Taipei | 10.31 | Q |
| 4 | 2 | Tyquendo Tracey | Jamaica | 10.32 | Q |
| 5 | 1 | Thando Roto | South Africa | 10.35 | Q |
| 5 | 4 | Emmanuel Yeboah | Ghana | 10.35 | Q |
| 7 | 4 | Heber Gallegos | Mexico | 10.37 | Q |
| 8 | 3 | Cameron Burrell | United States | 10.42 | Q |
| 9 | 2 | LeShon Collins | United States | 10.43 | Q |
| 10 | 1 | Skander Djamil Athmani | Algeria | 10.44 | Q, PB |
| 10 | 4 | Joseph Millar | New Zealand | 10.44 | Q |
| 12 | 1 | Diogo Antunes | Portugal | 10.48 | Q |
| 12 | 3 | Samuel Osewa | Great Britain | 10.48 | q |
| 14 | 4 | Imri Persiado | Israel | 10.52 | q |
| 15 | 1 | Eetu Rantala | Finland | 10.55 | q, =SB |
| 15 | 4 | Jiang Hengnan | China | 10.55 | q |
| 17 | 2 | Yusuke Tanaka | Japan | 10.60 | |
| 18 | 2 | Vladislav Grigoryev | Kazakhstan | 10.64 | |
| 18 | 3 | Markus Fuchs | Austria | 10.64 | |
| 20 | 1 | Kostas Skrabulis | Lithuania | 10.67 | |
| 20 | 3 | James Linde | Canada | 10.67 | |
| 22 | 2 | Zdeněk Stromšík | Czech Republic | 10.68 | |
| 23 | 4 | Marcus Lawler | Ireland | 10.70 | |
| 24 | 2 | Pascal Mancini | Switzerland | 10.71 | |
| 25 | 4 | Muhammad Aqil Yasmin | Malaysia | 10.73 | |
| 26 | 2 | Gabriel Constantino | Brazil | 10.74 | |
| 26 | 3 | Eryk Hampel | Poland | 10.74 | |
| 28 | 3 | Juan Carlos Alanis | Mexico | 10.77 | |
| 29 | 1 | Shadrack Opoku Agyemang | Ghana | 11.80 | |
| 30 | 4 | Dominik Záleský | Czech Republic | 12.18 | |
| 31 | 1 | Luca Antonio Cassano | Italy | 30.39 | |
| | 1 | Moriba Morain | Trinidad and Tobago | DNF | |

=== Semifinals ===
Qualification: First 4 in each heat (Q) qualified for the final.

Wind:
Heat 1: 0.0 m/s, Heat 2: +0.1 m/s

| Rank | Heat | Name | Nationality | Time | Notes |
|---|---|---|---|---|---|
| 1 | 2 | Thando Roto | South Africa | 10.18 | Q |
| 2 | 1 | Yang Chun-han | Chinese Taipei | 10.20 | Q, NR |
| 3 | 1 | Emmanuel Yeboah | Ghana | 10.26 | Q |
| 4 | 1 | Shuhei Tada | Japan | 10.27 | Q |
| 5 | 2 | Ján Volko | Slovakia | 10.28 | Q |
| 6 | 2 | Tyquendo Tracey | Jamaica | 10.29 | Q |
| 7 | 1 | Cameron Burrell | United States | 10.30 | Q |
| 8 | 2 | LeShon Collins | United States | 10.31 | Q |
| 9 | 2 | Joseph Millar | New Zealand | 10.35 | |
| 10 | 1 | Samuel Osewa | Great Britain | 10.42 | |
| 11 | 1 | Skander Djamil Athmani | Algeria | 10.44 | =PB |
| 11 | 1 | Jiang Hengnan | China | 10.44 | |
| 11 | 2 | Heber Gallegos | Mexico | 10.44 | |
| 14 | 2 | Eetu Rantala | Finland | 10.51 | SB |
| 15 | 1 | Diogo Antunes | Portugal | 10.54 | |
| | 2 | Imri Persiado | Israel | DNS | |

=== Final ===
Wind: -0.9 m/s

| Rank | Lane | Name | Nationality | Time | Notes |
|---|---|---|---|---|---|
| 1st place, gold medalist(s) | 1 | Yang Chun-han | Chinese Taipei | 10.22 | |
| 2nd place, silver medalist(s) | 4 | Thando Roto | South Africa | 10.24 | |
| 3rd place, bronze medalist(s) | 9 | Cameron Burrell | United States | 10.27 | |
| 4 | 3 | Tyquendo Tracey | Jamaica | 10.28 | |
| 5 | 6 | Ján Volko | Slovakia | 10.30 | |
| 6 | 2 | LeShon Collins | United States | 10.32 | |
| 7 | 8 | Shuhei Tada | Japan | 10.33 | |
| 8 | 7 | Emmanuel Yeboah | Ghana | 10.36 | |
