= Deji Tobais =

British sprinter (born 1991)

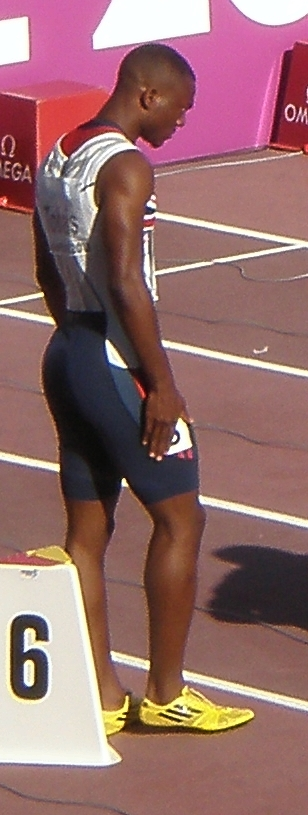

Deji Tobais (born 31 October 1991) is a British male track and field sprinter who competes in the 100 metres and 200 metres. He represented his country at age-category level including two medals at the European Athletics U23 Championships in 2013, where he set a European under-23 record in the 4 × 100 metres relay.

== Career ==
Raised in Luton, Tobais lost his hearing in his left ear as a result of childhood meningitis. He was a fast football player at primary school and his father took him to an athletics club at age ten, where his speed gave him an advantage. At Windsor, Slough, Eton and Hounslow Athletic Club, he began to focus on short sprinting and by 2006 he won the under-15 category at the AAA nationals in 100 m and 60 metres indoors. In 2008 he won the 100 m at the English Schools' Athletics Championships as well as a 100/200 m double at the national under-17 championships.

Tobais earned his first international selection at the 2008 Commonwealth Youth Games, coming fourth in the 100 m final. At the 2010 World Junior Championships in Athletics, he reached the semi-finals. The following year he ran in the heats for the 4 × 100 metres relay team, where Andrew Robertson, Kieran Showler-Davis, Richard Kilty and Danny Talbot took the silver in the final. The 2012 season brought him new personal bests of 10.29 for the 100 m and 20.61 seconds for the 200 m. He maintained this form into 2013 and he came away with two medals at the 2013 European Athletics U23 Championships, taking 100 m silver behind Adam Gemili, before teaming up with his compatriot to set a European under-23 record of 38.77 seconds.

A personal best of 10.18 seconds was the highlight of his 2014 season. He was fifth at the British Athletics Championships that year. His performances dropped thereafter and he failed to make the national 100 m final in the next three seasons.

== International competitions ==
Year	Competition	Venue	Position	Event	Notes
2008	Commonwealth Youth Games	Pune, India	4th	100 m	10.52
2010	World Junior Championships	Moncton, Canada	4th (semis)	100 m	10.73 w
2011	European U23 Championships	Ostrava, Czech Republic	1st	4 × 100 m relay	39.31 (heats)
2013	European U23 Championships	Tampere, Finland	2nd	100 m	10.29
2013	European U23 Championships	Tampere, Finland	1st	4 × 100 m relay	38.77 AUR

== Personal bests ==
- 60 metres – 6.74 (2018)
- 100 metres – 10.18 (2014)
- 200 metres – 20.61 (2012)
