= Grzegorz Zimniewicz =

Polish sprinter (born 1991)

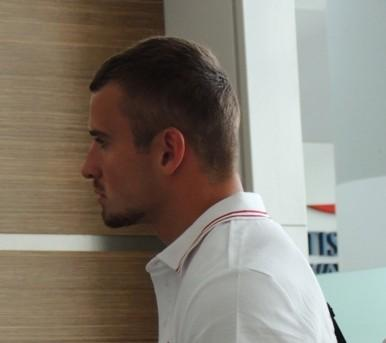
- Grzegorz Zimniewicz in 2013

Personal information
- Born: 13 October 1991 (age 35) Leszno, Poland
- Education: PWSZ Leszno
- Height: 1.84 m (6 ft 0 in)
- Weight: 82 kg (181 lb)

Sport
- Sport: Athletics
- Event: 100 metres
- Club: UKS Achilles Leszno
- Coached by: Dariusz Górski
Medal record
Men's athletics
Representing Poland
European U23 Championships
Silver medal – second place	2013 Tampere	4 x 100 m
Universiade
Silver medal – second place	2015 Gwangju	4 × 100 m relay

Grzegorz Zimniewicz (born 13 October 1991) is a Polish athlete competing in sprinting events. He represented his country in the 4 × 100 metres relay at the 2013 World Championships without qualifying for the final.

== International competitions ==
Year	Competition	Venue	Position	Event	Notes
Representing Poland
2009	European Junior Championships	Novi Sad, Serbia	6th (h)	4 × 100 m relay	40.70
2010	World Junior Championships	Moncton, Canada	4th (h)	100 m	10.37^{1}
2010	World Junior Championships	Moncton, Canada	10th (h)	4 × 100 m relay	40.24
2011	European U23 Championships	Ostrava, Czech Republic	11th (h)	100 m	10.64
2011	European U23 Championships	Ostrava, Czech Republic	4th	4 × 100 m relay	39.40
2011	Military World Games	Rio de Janeiro, Brazil	24th (h)	100 m	10.97^{2}
2011	Military World Games	Rio de Janeiro, Brazil	1st	4 × 100 m relay	39.63
2013	European U23 Championships	Tampere, Finland	5th	100 m	10.55
2013	European U23 Championships	Tampere, Finland	2nd	4 × 100 m relay	38.81
2013	World Championships	Moscow, Russia	11th (h)	4 × 100 m relay	38.51
2015	Universiade	Gwangju, South Korea	2nd	4 × 100 m relay	39.50
2015	Military World Games	Mungyeong, South Korea	14th (sf)	100 m	10.79
2015	Military World Games	Mungyeong, South Korea	1st	4 × 100 m relay	39.35
2016	European Championships	Amsterdam, Netherlands	6th	4 × 100 m relay	38.69
2017	IAAF World Relays	Nassau, Bahamas	17th (h)	4 × 100 m relay	39.84
2017	Universiade	Taipei, Taiwan	–	4 × 100 m relay	DQ

^{1}Disqualified in the semifinals

^{2}Did not finish in the semifinals

== Personal bests ==
Outdoor

- 100 metres – 10.31 (+0.8 m/s, Łódź 2013)
- 200 metres – 21.08 (-0.6 m/s, Zielona Góra 2010)

Indoor

- 60 metres – 6.66 (Spała 2014)
