= 2018 European Athletics Championships – Men's 200 metres =

Men's 200 metres at the 2018 European Athletics Championships
- Venue: Olympic Stadium
- Location: Berlin
- Dates: August 8 (round 1 & semi-finals); August 9 (final)
- Competitors: 40 from 22 nations
- Winning time: 19.76

Medalists
gold medal	Ramil Guliyev	Turkey
silver medal	Nethaneel Mitchell-Blake	Great Britain
bronze medal	Alex Wilson	Switzerland

The men's 200 metres at the 2018 European Athletics Championships took place at the Olympic Stadium on 8 and 9 August.

== Records ==
Standing records prior to the 2018 European Athletics Championships
World record	Usain Bolt (JAM)	19.19	Berlin, Germany	20 August 2009
European record	Pietro Mennea (ITA)	19.72	Mexico City, Mexico	12 September 1979
Championship record	Konstantinos Kenteris (GRE)	19.85	Munich, Germany	9 August 2002
World Leading	Noah Lyles (USA)	19.65	Monaco	20 July 2018
European Leading	Ramil Guliyev (TUR)	19.90	Oslo, Norway	7 June 2018
Broken records during the 2018 European Athletics Championships
Championship record	Ramil Guliyev (TUR)	19.76	Berlin, Germany	9 August 2018
European Leading	Ramil Guliyev (TUR)	19.76	Berlin, Germany	9 August 2018

== Schedule ==
Date	Time	Round
8 August 2018	10:50	Round 1
8 August 2018	20:15	Semi-finals
9 August 2018	21:05	Final

All times are local times (UTC+2)

== Competition format ==
The top ten ranked athletes by time during the season who entered the championships were given a bye into the semi-finals.

== Results ==
=== Round 1 ===
First 3 in each heat (Q) and the next 2 fastest (q) advance to the semi-finals.

==== Heat 1 ====
Rank	Lane	Athlete	Nation	Time	Notes
1	5	Robin Vanderbemden	Belgium	20.50	Q
2	2	Andrew Howe	Italy	20.60	Q
3	8	Taymir Burnet	Netherlands	20.67	Q
4	3	Robin Erewa	Germany	20.69	q
5	1	Pol Retamal	Spain	20.92	
6	7	Emil Ibrahimov	Ukraine	21.29	
7	4	Alexandru Terpezan	Romania	21.39	
8	2	Denis Dimitrov	Bulgaria	21.43	
				Wind: +0.1 m/s	

==== Heat 2 ====
Rank	Lane	Athlete	Nation	Time	Notes
1	8	Lykourgos-Stefanos Tsakonas	Greece	20.49	Q
2	4	Mickaël-Méba Zeze	France	20.65	Q, SB
3	3	Davide Manenti	Italy	20.70	Q
4	7	Jonathan Quarcoo	Norway	20.77	q
5	2	Marcus Lawler	Ireland	20.80	
6	5	Ionut Andrei Neagoe	Romania	21.21	
7	6	Sergio Juárez	Spain	21.33	
				Wind: -0.1 m/s	

==== Heat 3 ====
Rank	Lane	Athlete	Nation	Time	Notes
1	7	Eseosa Desalu	Italy	20.39	Q, SB
2	8	Stuart Dutamby	France	20.64	Q
3	6	Delano Williams	Great Britain	20.89	Q
4	2	Felix Svensson	Sweden	20.95	
5	5	Oskari Lehtonen	Finland	21.06	
6	4	Jan Jirka	Czech Republic	21.15	
7	3	Šimon Bujna	Slovakia	21.26	
				Wind: +0.2 m/s	

==== Heat 4 ====
Rank	Lane	Athlete	Nation	Time	Notes
1	1	Solomon Bockarie	Netherlands	20.66	Q
2	8	Steven Müller	Germany	20.78	Q
3	4	Daniel Rodríguez	Spain	20.81	Q
4	5	Silvan Wicki	Switzerland	20.93	
5	6	Gediminas Truskauskas	Lithuania	21.11	
6	3	Panayiótis Trivizás	Greece	21.18	
7	7	Markus Fuchs	Austria	21.29	
8	2	Paisios Dimiatriades	Cyprus	21.31	
				Wind: +0.2 m/s	

=== Semi-finals ===
First 2 (Q) and next 2 fastest (q) qualify for the final.

==== Heat 1 ====
Rank	Lane	Athlete	Nation	Time	Notes
1	4	Ramil Guliyev*	Turkey	20.33	Q
2	3	Leon Reid*	Ireland	20.38	Q
3	5	Ján Volko*	Slovakia	20.58	
4	7	Steven Müller	Germany	20.76	
5	8	Davide Manenti	Italy	20.81	
6	2	Taymir Burnet	Netherlands	20.84	
–	6	Stuart Dutamby	France	DNS	
–	1	Delano Williams	Great Britain	DNS	
				Wind: +0.3 m/s	

==== Heat 2 ====
Rank	Lane	Athlete	Nation	Time	Notes
1	4	Bruno Hortelano*	Spain	20.29	Q
2	6	Eseosa Desalu	Italy	20.35	Q, SB
3	5	Adam Gemili*	Great Britain	20.46	q
4	2	Mickaël-Méba Zeze	France	20.49	SB
5	3	Churandy Martina*	Netherlands	20.51	
6	8	Lykourgos-Stefanos Tsakonas	Greece	20.54	
7	7	Robin Vanderbemden	Belgium	20.62	
8	1	Robin Erewa	Germany	20.79	
				Wind: +0.3 m/s	

==== Heat 3 ====
Rank	Lane	Athlete	Nation	Time	Notes
1	4	Alex Wilson*	Switzerland	20.16	Q
2	5	Nethaneel Mitchell-Blake*	Great Britain	20.35	Q
3	7	Solomon Bockarie	Netherlands	20.41	q, SB
4	3	Serhiy Smelyk*	Ukraine	20.54	
5	2	Daniel Rodríguez	Spain	20.77	
6	8	Andrew Howe	Italy	20.78	
7	6	Aleixo-Platini Menga*	Germany	20.83	
8	1	Jonathan Quarcoo	Norway	21.07	
				Wind: +0.3 m/s	

*Athletes who received a bye to the semi-finals

=== Final ===
Rank	Lane	Athlete	Nation	Time	Notes
1st place, gold medalist(s)	6	Ramil Guliyev	Turkey	19.76	CR, EL, NR
2nd place, silver medalist(s)	4	Nethaneel Mitchell-Blake	Great Britain	20.04	SB
3rd place, bronze medalist(s)	5	Alex Wilson	Switzerland	20.04	NR
4	3	Bruno Hortelano	Spain	20.05	
5	2	Adam Gemili	Great Britain	20.10	SB
6	7	Eseosa Desalu	Italy	20.13	PB
7	8	Leon Reid	Ireland	20.37	
8	1	Solomon Bockarie	Netherlands	20.39	SB
				Wind: +0.7 m/s	
