= 2022 World Athletics Indoor Championships – Men's 60 metres =

Men's 60 metres at the 2022 World Athletics Indoor Championships
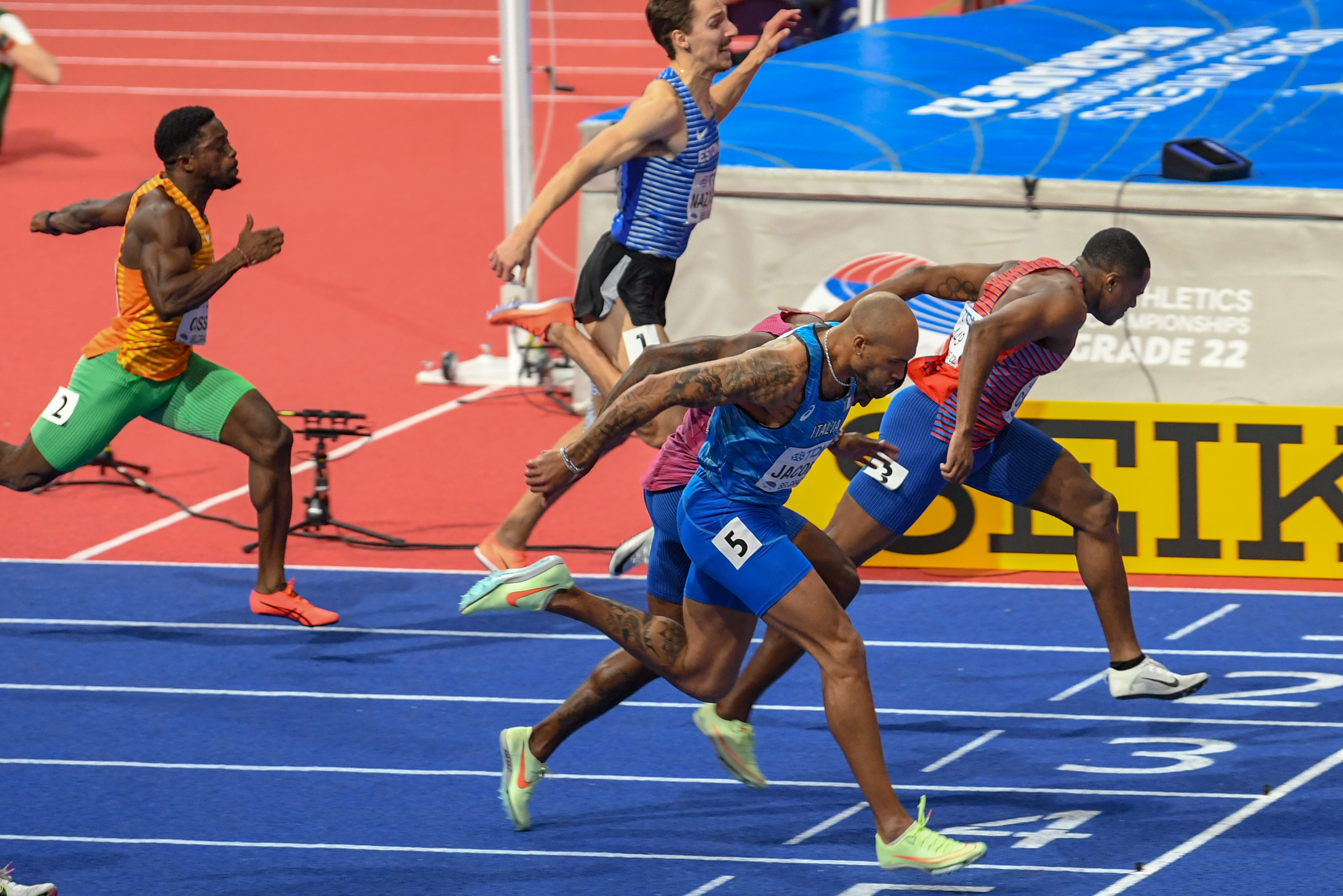
- The final arrive
- Venue: Štark Arena
- Dates: 19 March
- Competitors: 46 from 41 nations
- Winning time: 6.41

Medalists
gold medal	Marcell Jacobs	Italy
silver medal	Christian Coleman	United States
bronze medal	Marvin Bracy	United States

The men's 60 metres at the 2022 World Athletics Indoor Championships took place on 19 March 2022

== Results ==
=== Heats ===
Qualification: First 3 in each heat (Q) and the next 3 fastest (q) advance to the Semi-Finals

The heats were started at 10:45.

Rank	Heat	Lane	Name	Nationality	Time	Notes
1	4	2	Marvin Bracy	United States	6.46	Q, PB
2	1	5	Christian Coleman	United States	6.51	Q
3	4	6	Femi Ogunode	Qatar	6.52	Q, SB
4	5	5	Marcell Jacobs	Italy	6.53	Q
5	3	3	Arthur Cissé	Ivory Coast	6.55	Q
6	4	8	Karl Erik Nazarov	Estonia	6.55	Q, NR
7	7	2	Bolade Ajomale	Canada	6.57	Q, PB
8	3	4	Shuhei Tada	Japan	6.57	Q, SB
9	3	2	Lalu Muhammad Zohri	Indonesia	6.58	Q, NR
10	7	7	Adam Thomas	Great Britain	6.59	Q,
11	1	4	Aleksandar Askovic	Germany	6.61	Q, PB
12	3	7	Stephen Abosi	Botswana	6.62	q, NR
13	2	7	Ferdinand Omanyala	Kenya	6.62	Q
14	3	8	Andrew Robertson	Great Britain	6.62	q
14	4	4	Carlos Nascimento	Portugal	6.62	q, PB
16	5	6	Jerod Elcock	Trinidad and Tobago	6.63	Q
17	1	8	Bernat Canet	Spain	6.63	Q
18	5	7	Imranur Rahman	Bangladesh	6.64	Q, NR
19	2	4	Mario Burke	Barbados	6.64	Q
20	2	1	Nigel Ellis	Jamaica	6.64	Q, PB
21	2	8	Israel Olatunde	Ireland	6.66	
21	4	5	Giovanni Galbieri	Italy	6.66	
23	6	8	Travis Collins	Guyana	6.66	Q
24	6	3	Rikkoi Brathwaite	British Virgin Islands	6.66	Q
25	1	2	Ján Volko	Slovakia	6.66	SB
26	7	5	Felipe Bardi dos Santos	Brazil	6.66	Q
27	3	6	Dominik Illovszky	Hungary	6.67	
28	5	3	Markus Fuchs	Austria	6.68	
29	5	2	Miles Lewis	Puerto Rico	6.69	
30	6	4	David Vivas	Venezuela	6.69	Q
31	2	2	Adrian Brzeziński	Poland	6.69	
32	6	2	Ali Anwar Ali Al Balushi	Oman	6.71	
33	7	4	Sean Safo-Antwi	Ghana	6.71	
34	2	5	Erik Cardoso	Brazil	6.73	
35	7	8	Hassan Taftian	Iran	6.75	SB
36	1	3	Aleksa Kijanović	Serbia	6.80	
37	2	3	Favoris Muzrapov	Tajikistan	6.83	NR
38	5	8	Hassan Saaid	Maldives	6.87	SB
39	6	7	Fabrice Dabla	Togo	6.87	
40	2	6	Mohamed Alhammadi	United Arab Emirates	6.94	PB
41	7	6	Benele Simphiwe Dlamini	Eswatini	6.98	PB
42	4	3	Mateo Vargas	Paraguay	7.08	
43	1	7	Craig Gill	Gibraltar	7.10	PB
	4	7	Przemysław Słowikowski	Poland	DQ	TR16.8
	1	6	Umar Khayam Hameed	Pakistan	DQ	TR16.8
	3	5	Foday Kallon	Sierra Leone	DQ	TR16.8
	5	4	Melique García	Honduras	DNS	
	7	3	Francesco Sansovini	San Marino	DNS	
	6	5	Joris van Gool	Netherlands	DNS	
	6	6	Emmanuel Eseme	Cameroon	DNS	

=== Semifinals ===
Qualification: First 2 in each heat (Q) and the next 2 fastest (q) advance to the Final

The heats were started at 18:40.

Rank	Heat	Lane	Name	Nationality	Time	Notes
1	2	3	Marcell Jacobs	Italy	6.45	Q, =WL NR
2	3	6	Christian Coleman	United States	6.51	Q
2	1	3	Marvin Bracy	United States	6.51	Q
4	2	5	Adam Thomas	Great Britain	6.57	Q
5	3	5	Bolade Ajomale	Canada	6.58	Q
6	2	7	Karl Erik Nazarov	Estonia	6.59	q
7	2	4	Arthur Cissé	Ivory Coast	6.59	q
8	3	4	Femi Ogunode	Qatar	6.60	
9	2	2	Stephen Abosi	Botswana	6.61	NR
10	3	3	Aleksandar Askovic	Germany	6.62	
11	1	6	Jerod Elcock	Trinidad and Tobago	6.63	Q
12	1	2	Andrew Robertson	Great Britain	6.64	
13	1	4	Ferdinand Omanyala	Kenya	6.64	
14	1	1	Nigel Ellis	Jamaica	6.65	
15	3	1	Carlos Nascimento	Portugal	6.65	
16	1	8	Mario Burke	Barbados	6.67	
17	3	2	Felipe Bardi dos Santos	Brazil	6.67	
18	1	5	Travis Collins	Guyana	6.67	
19	2	1	David Vivas	Venezuela	6.79	
20	3	8	Bernat Canet	Spain	8.29	
	1	7	Imranur Rahman	Bangladesh	DNF	
	2	6	Shuhei Tada	Japan	DQ	TR16.8
	2	8	Lalu Muhammad Zohri	Indonesia	DNS	
	3	7	Rikkoi Brathwaite	British Virgin Islands	DNS	

=== Final ===
The final was started at 21:20

Rank	Lane	Name	Nationality	Time	Notes
1st place, gold medalist(s)	5	Marcell Jacobs	Italy	6.41 (6.407)	WL AR
2nd place, silver medalist(s)	3	Christian Coleman	United States	6.41 (6.410)	WL
3rd place, bronze medalist(s)	4	Marvin Bracy	United States	6.44	PB
4	1	Karl Erik Nazarov	Estonia	6.58	
5	6	Adam Thomas	Great Britain	6.60	
6	8	Jerod Elcock	Trinidad and Tobago	6.63	
7	7	Bolade Ajomale	Canada	6.63	
8	2	Arthur Cissé	Ivory Coast	6.69	
