= 2016 European Athletics Championships – Men's 100 metres =

Men's 100 metres at the 2016 European Athletics Championships
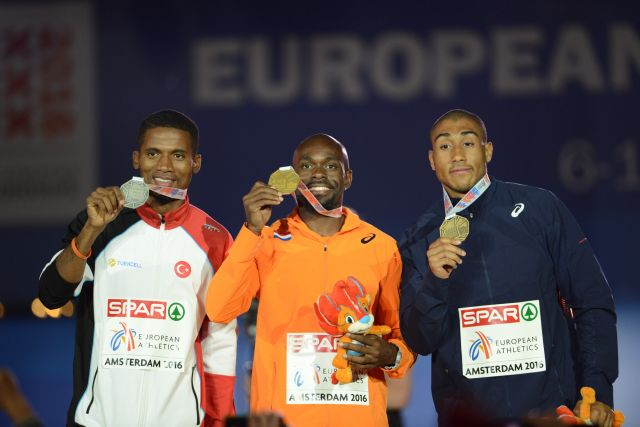
- The podium.
- Venue: Olympic Stadium
- Location: Amsterdam
- Dates: July 6 (Round 1); July 7 (semifinals & final)
- Competitors: 36 from 19 nations
- Winning time: 10.07

Medalists
gold medal	Churandy Martina	Netherlands
silver medal	Jak Ali Harvey	Turkey
bronze medal	Jimmy Vicaut	France

The men's 100 metres at the 2016 European Athletics Championships took place at the Olympic Stadium on 6 and 7 July. The event consisted of three rounds, Preliminary, semi-final and final, with the top nine ranked athletes automatically entered at the semi-final stage.

The gold and silver medallists clocked the same time in the final (10.07 seconds), the first time this has happened at these championships since the introduction of fully automatic timing.

== Records ==
Standing records prior to the 2016 European Athletics Championships
World record	Usain Bolt (JAM)	9.58	Berlin, Germany	16 August 2009
European record	Francis Obikwelu (POR)	9.86	Athens, Greece	22 August 2004
Championship record	Francis Obikwelu (POR)	9.99	Gothenburg, Sweden	8 August 2006
World Leading	Jimmy Vicaut (FRA)	9.86	Montreuil-sous-Bois, France	7 June 2016
European Leading	Jimmy Vicaut (FRA)	9.86	Montreuil-sous-Bois, France	7 June 2016

== Schedule ==
Date	Time	Round
6 July 2016	12:40	Round 1
7 July 2016	18:00	Semifinals
7 July 2016	19:50	Final

All times are local times (UTC+2)

== Results ==
=== Round 1 ===
First 3 in each heat (Q) and the next fastest 4 (q) advance to the Semifinals. 9 fastest entrants awarded bye to Semifinals.

Wind:
Heat 1: +0.5 m/s, Heat 2: +0.8 m/s, Heat 3: +1.9 m/s, Heat 4: +0.6 m/s

Rank	Heat	Lane	Name	Nationality	Time	Note
1	3	5	Ramil Guliyev	Turkey	10.21	Q
2	1	8	Richard Kilty	Great Britain	10.24	Q
2	3	7	Ojie Edoburun	Great Britain	10.24	Q
4	4	3	Filippo Tortu	Italy	10.25	Q
5	2	6	Solomon Bockarie	Netherlands	10.26	Q
5	3	3	Massimiliano Ferraro	Italy	10.26	Q, PB
7	2	4	Alex Wilson	Switzerland	10.30	Q, SB
8	2	3	Jan Veleba	Czech Republic	10.30	Q
9	2	2	Przemysław Słowikowski	Poland	10.35	q, PB
9	4	8	Lucas Jakubczyk	Germany	10.35	Q
11	1	7	Hensley Paulina	Netherlands	10.36	Q
12	3	2	Rytis Sakalauskas	Lithuania	10.37	q
13	1	4	Ángel David Rodríguez	Spain	10.40	Q
14	4	4	Ján Volko	Slovakia	10.42	Q
15	4	7	János Sipos	Hungary	10.45	q
16	4	5	Remigiusz Olszewski	Poland	10.46	q
17	1	6	Marek Niit	Estonia	10.48	
18	1	5	Giovanni Galbieri	Italy	10.48	
19	1	2	Jakub Matúš	Slovakia	10.51	
19	3	4	Diogo Antunes	Portugal	10.51	
21	1	3	Carlos Nascimento	Portugal	10.54	
22	3	8	Markus Fuchs	Austria	10.56	
23	2	7	Denis Dimitrov	Bulgaria	10.57	
24	2	8	Volodymyr Suprun	Ukraine	10.58	
25	4	2	Emil Ibrahimov	Ukraine	10.61	
	3	6	Vitaliy Korzh	Ukraine	DNF	
	2	5	Kevin Moore	Malta	DQ	R162.7
	4	6	Reto Schenkel	Switzerland	DNS	

=== Semifinals ===
First 2 (Q) and next 2 fastest (q) qualify for the final.

Wind:
Heat 1: +1.5 m/s, Heat 2: +0.6 m/s, Heat 3: -0.4 m/s

Rank	Heat	Lane	Name	Nationality	Time	Note
1	1	3	Jimmy Vicaut*	France	10.03	Q
2	1	6	James Ellington*	Great Britain	10.04	Q, PB
2	2	6	Jak Ali Harvey*	Turkey	10.04	Q
4	1	4	Ramil Guliyev	Turkey	10.07	q, PB
5	1	7	Solomon Bockarie	Netherlands	10.13	q, PB
6	3	6	Richard Kilty	Great Britain	10.15	Q
7	1	5	Lucas Jakubczyk	Germany	10.16	SB
8	2	3	Churandy Martina*	Netherlands	10.16	Q
9	2	7	Filippo Tortu	Italy	10.19	PB
10	2	4	Ojie Edoburun	Great Britain	10.20	
11	3	4	Bruno Hortelano*	Spain	10.22	Q
12	3	3	Julian Reus*	Germany	10.22	
13	1	8	Massimiliano Ferraro	Italy	10.26	=PB
13	2	5	Stuart Dutamby*	France	10.26	
15	1	1	Przemysław Słowikowski	Poland	10.27	PB
16	1	2	Jan Veleba	Czech Republic	10.28	=SB
17	3	5	Emre Zafer Barnes*	Turkey	10.31	
18	3	8	Hensley Paulina	Netherlands	10.33	
19	3	2	Alex Wilson	Switzerland	10.34	
20	2	2	Rytis Sakalauskas	Lithuania	10.40	
21	3	1	Ján Volko	Slovakia	10.43	
22	3	7	János Sipos	Hungary	10.47	
23	2	8	Remigiusz Olszewski	Poland	10.56	
24	2	1	Ángel David Rodríguez	Spain	12.13	

*Athletes who received a bye to the semifinals

=== Final ===
Wind: 0.0 m/s

Rank	Lane	Name	Nationality	Time	Note
1st place, gold medalist(s)	8	Churandy Martina	Netherlands	10.07	SB
2nd place, silver medalist(s)	5	Jak Ali Harvey	Turkey	10.07	
3rd place, bronze medalist(s)	6	Jimmy Vicaut	France	10.08	
4	9	Bruno Hortelano	Spain	10.12	
5	7	James Ellington	Great Britain	10.19	
6	3	Ramil Guliyev	Turkey	10.23	
7	2	Solomon Bockarie	Netherlands	10.25	
	4	Richard Kilty	Great Britain	DQ	R162.7
