= 2013 European Athletics U23 Championships – Men's 4 × 100 metres relay =

The Men's 4 x 100 metres relay event at the 2013 European Athletics U23 Championships was held in Tampere, Finland, at Ratina Stadium on 14 July.

== Medalists ==
Gold	Deji Tobais; Danny Talbot; Dannish Walker-Khan; Adam Gemili; David Bolarinwa^{†} Samuel Osewa^{†} United Kingdom
Silver	Remigiusz Olszewski; Przemysław Słowikowski; Karol Zalewski; Grzegorz Zimniewicz; Poland
Bronze	Eduard Viles; Adrià Burriel; Bruno Hortelano; Eusebio Cáceres; Spain

^{†}: Competed only in heat.

== Results ==
=== Final ===
14 July 2013 / 17:20

Rank	Name	Nationality	Lane	Reaction Time	Time	Notes
1st place, gold medalist(s)	United Kingdom	Deji Tobais; Danny Talbot; Dannish Walker-Khan; Adam Gemili	5	0.179	38.77	EUR, CUR
2nd place, silver medalist(s)	Poland	Remigiusz Olszewski; Przemysław Słowikowski; Karol Zalewski; Grzegorz Zimniewicz	3	0.151	38.81	
3rd place, bronze medalist(s)	Spain	Eduard Viles; Adrià Burriel; Bruno Hortelano; Eusebio Cáceres	8	0.152	38.87	NUR
4	Germany	Yannick Hoecker; Patrick Domogala; Roy Schmidt; Robin Erewa	4	0.174	38.88	NUR
5	Czech Republic	Jan Jirka; Lukáš Šťastný; Pavel Maslák; Michal Desenský	2	0.164	39.23	NUR
6	France	Jean-Baptiste Formet; Aurel Manga; Jeffrey John; Ken Romain	1	0.152	39.46	
7	Italy	Federico Cattaneo; Francesco Basciani; Giacomo Tortu; Giovanni Galbieri	7	0.127	39.55	
8	Sweden	David Sennung; Benjamin Olsson; Joel Groth; Jan Wocalewski	6	0.150	39.58	NUR

=== Heats ===
Qualified: First 3 in each heat (Q) and 2 best performers (q) advance to the Final

==== Summary ====
Rank	Nation	Time	Notes
1	Poland	39.14	Q
2	Germany	39.25	Q
3	United Kingdom	39.35	Q
4	Spain	39.36	Q
5	Czech Republic	39.56	q
6	France	39.65	q
7	Finland	39.80	
8	Sweden	39.95	Q
9	Italy	39.98	Q
10	Estonia	40.03	
11	Lithuania	40.13	
12	Portugal	40.74	
13	Israel	40.77	
	Netherlands	DNF	
	Georgia	DNS	

==== Details ====
===== Heat 1 =====
14 July 2013 / 15:05

Rank	Nation	Competitors	Lane	Reaction Time	Time	Notes
1	Poland	Remigiusz Olszewski; Przemysław Słowikowski; Karol Zalewski; Grzegorz Zimniewicz	3	0.160	39.14	Q
2	Germany	Yannick Hoecker; Patrick Domogala; Roy Schmidt; Robin Erewa	6	0.164	39.25	Q
3	Spain	Eduard Viles; Adrià Burriel; Bruno Hortelano; Eusebio Cáceres	5	0.145	39.36	Q
4	Czech Republic	Jan Jirka; Lukáš Šťastný; Pavel Maslák; Michal Desenský	1	0.168	39.56	q
5	France	Jean-Baptiste Formet; Aurel Manga; Pierre Chalus; Ken Romain	8	0.162	39.65	q
6	Finland	Arttu Halmela; Markus Koivula; Jani Koskela; Eetu Rantala	2	0.157	39.80	
7	Estonia	Kaspar Mesila; Richard Pulst; Markus Ellisaar; Timo Tiismaa	7	0.151	40.03	
	Georgia	Bachana Khorava; Denis Zhvania; Nika Kartavtsev; Irakli Ashortia	4		DNS	

===== Heat 2 =====
14 July 2013 / 15:15

Rank	Nation	Competitors	Lane	Reaction Time	Time	Notes
1	United Kingdom	Deji Tobais; David Bolarinwa; Dannish Walker-Khan; Samuel Osewa	6	0.193	39.35	Q
2	Sweden	David Sennung; Benjamin Olsson; Joel Groth; Jan Wocalewski	3	0.151	39.95	Q
3	Italy	Federico Cattaneo; Francesco Basciani; Giacomo Tortu; Giovanni Galbieri	4	0.160	39.98	Q
4	Lithuania	Ugnius Savickas; Domantas Žalga; Kostas Skrabulis; Lukas Gaudutis	2	0.186	40.13	
5	Portugal	Diogo Antunes; Tiago Silvestre; António Brandão; Samuel Remédios	5	0.182	40.74	
6	Israel	Amir Hamidulin; Omri Harosh; Amit Cohen; Dayan Aviv	1	0.152	40.77	
	Netherlands	Jonathan Mutebwa; Koen van Erve; Erik Stevens; Hensley Paulina	7	0.169	DNF	

== Participation ==
According to an unofficial count, 59 athletes from 14 countries participated in the event.

- Czech Republic (4)
- Estonia (4)
- Finland (4)
- France (5)
- Germany (4)
- Israel (4)
- Italy (4)
- Lithuania (4)
- Netherlands (4)
- Poland (4)
- Portugal (4)
- Spain (4)
- Sweden (4)
- United Kingdom (6)
