= Robin Erewa =

German sprinter

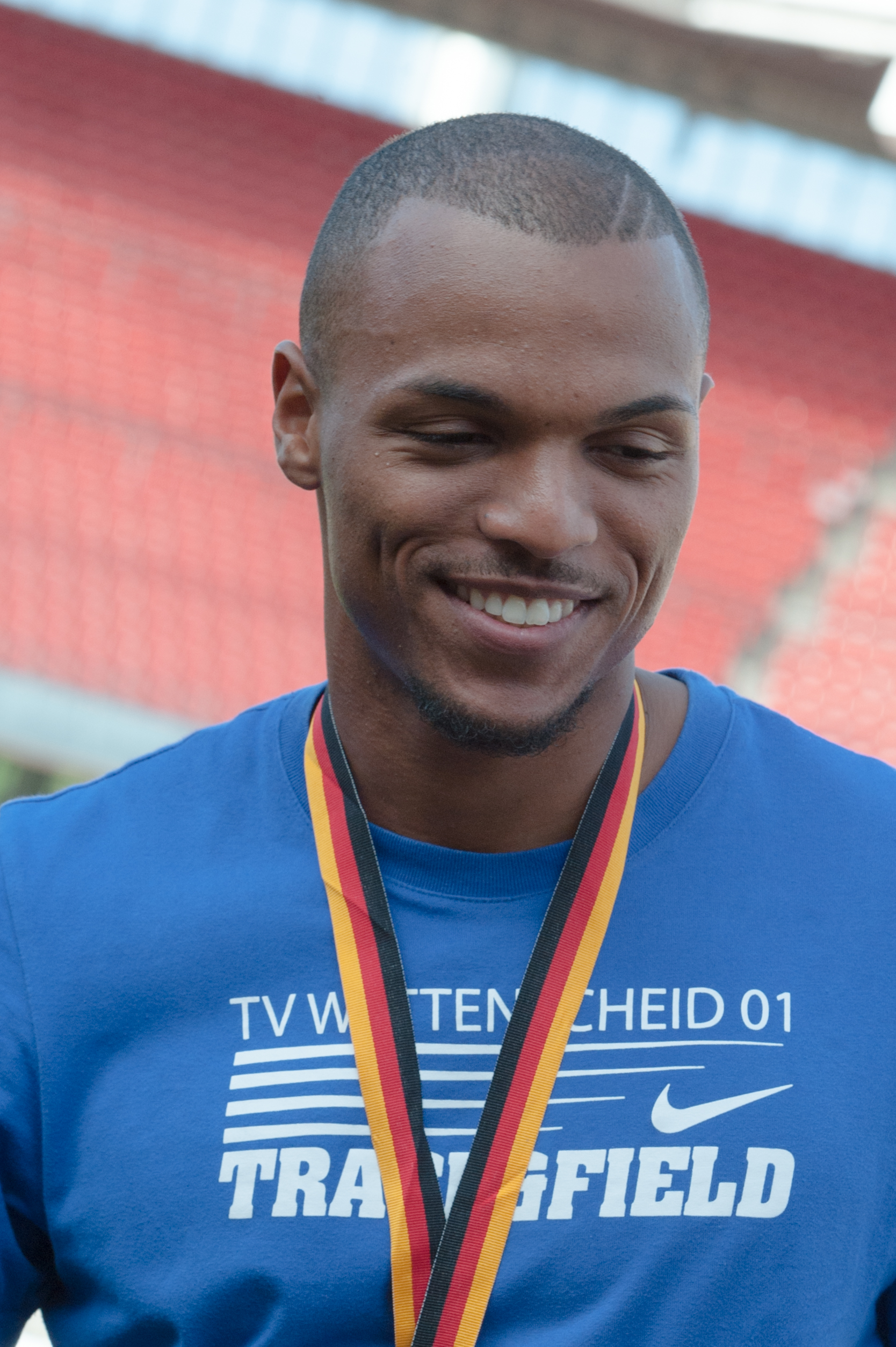
- Robin Erewa in 2015

Personal information
- Born: 24 June 1991 (age 35) Oberhausen, Germany
- Height: 1.84 m (6 ft 0 in)
- Weight: 77 kg (170 lb)

Sport
- Sport: Athletics
- Event: 200 metres

Robin Erewa (born 24 June 1991) is a German sprinter specialising in the 200 metres. He competed at the 2015 World Championships in Beijing without advancing from the first round. Born of a Nigerian father, he first played football before switching to athletics at the age of 12.

== Competition record ==
Year	Competition	Venue	Position	Event	Notes
Representing Germany
2010	World Junior Championships	Moncton, Canada	5th	200 m	21.09
2010	World Junior Championships	Moncton, Canada	5th	4 × 100 m relay	39.97
2011	European U23 Championships	Ostrava, Czech Republic	11th (sf)	200 m	21.10
2011	European U23 Championships	Ostrava, Czech Republic	3rd	4 × 100 m relay	39.19
2013	European U23 Championships	Tampere, Finland	9th (h)	200 m	21.02
2013	European U23 Championships	Tampere, Finland	4th	4 × 100 m relay	38.88
2014	World Relays	Nassau, Bahamas	–	4 × 200 m relay	DNF
2014	European Championships	Zürich, Switzerland	14th (sf)	200 m	20.82
2015	World Relays	Nassau, Bahamas	3rd	4 × 200 m relay	1:22.65
2015	World Championships	Beijing, China	38th (h)	200 m	20.67
2016	European Championships	Amsterdam, Netherlands	18th (sf)	200 m	20.98
2016	Olympic Games	Rio de Janeiro, Brazil	45th (h)	200 m	20.61
2017	World Relays	Nassau, Bahamas	2nd (B)	4 × 100 m relay	39.15
2017	World Relays	Nassau, Bahamas	–	4 × 200 m relay	DNF
2017	World Championships	London, United Kingdom	10th (h)	4 × 100 m relay	38.66
2018	European Championships	Berlin, Germany	18th (sf)	200 m	20.79
2019	World Relays	Yokohama, Japan	16th (h)	4 × 100 m relay	38.91
2019	World Relays	Yokohama, Japan	3rd	4 × 200 m relay	1:21.26
2022	European Championships	Munich, Germany	21st (h)	200 m	21.12

== Personal bests ==
Outdoor

- 100 metres – 10.31 (+0.8 m/s, Ulm 2014)
- 200 metres – 20.46 (+1.7 m/s, Mannheim 2014)

Indoor

- 60 metres – 6.80 (Leipzig 2016)
- 200 metres – 20.56 (Leipzig 2014)
