= Thando Roto =

South African sprinter

Personal information
- Born: 26 September 1995 (age 30)

Sport
- Country: South Africa
- Sport: Athletics
- Event: Sprint

Achievements and titles
- Personal bests: 100 m – 9.95 (2017); 200 m – 21.12 (2014)
Medal record
Summer Universiade
Silver medal – second place	2017 Taipei	100 m

Thando Roto (born 26 September 1995) is a South African sprinter.
