= Aurel Manga =

French hurdler

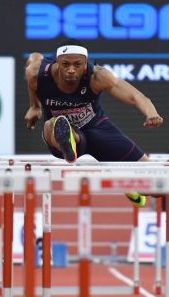
- Aurel Manga (center) at the 2017 European Indoor Championships

Personal information
- Born: 24 July 1992 (age 34) Paris, France
- Height: 1.90 m (6 ft 3 in)
- Weight: 90 kg (198 lb)

Sport
- Country: France
- Sport: Athletics
- Events: 60 m hurdles 110 m hurdles
- Club: Ca Montreuil 93
- Coached by: Giscard Samba-Koundy
Medal record
Men's athletics
Representing France
World Indoor Championships
Bronze medal – third place	2018 Birmingham	60 m hurdles
European Indoor Championships
Bronze medal – third place	2019 Glasgow	60 m hurdles

Aurel Manga (born 24 July 1992) is a French athlete specialising in hurdling. He finished sixth at the 2016 European Championships and fifth at the 2017 European Indoor Championships.

== Career ==
His personal bests are 13.33 seconds in the 110 metres hurdles (+1.7 m/s, Angers 2016) and 7.53 seconds in the 60 metres hurdles (Bordeaux 2017).

On 4 March 2018, Manga won the bronze medal at the World Indoor Championships 2018 Birmingham in the 60 m hurdles, where Britain's Andrew Pozzi (7.46 seconds) beat America's Jarret Eaton (7.47 seconds) in a photo finish. He repeated his bronze medal win at the 2019 European Athletics Indoor Championships in Glasgow, UK.

== Personal life ==
Born in France, Manga is of Cameroonian descent.

== International competitions ==
Year	Competition	Venue	Position	Event	Notes
Representing France
2013	European U23 Championships	Tampere, Finland	10th (sf)	100 m	10.57
2013	European U23 Championships	Tampere, Finland	6th	4 × 100 m relay	39.46
2016	European Championships	Amsterdam, Netherlands	6th	110 m hurdles	13.47
2017	European Indoor Championships	Belgrade, Serbia	5th	60 m hurdles	7.58
2017	World Championships	London, United Kingdom	24th (h)	110 m hurdles	13.58
2018	World Indoor Championships	Birmingham, United Kingdom	3rd	60 m hurdles	7.54
2018	European Championships	Berlin, Germany	7th	110 m hurdles	13.51
2019	European Indoor Championships	Glasgow, United Kingdom	3rd	60 m hurdles	7.63
2021	European Indoor Championships	Toruń, Poland	5th	60 m hurdles	7.63
2021	Olympic Games	Tokyo, Japan	8th	110 m hurdles	13.38
2022	European Championships	Munich, Germany	15th (sf)	110 m hurdles	13.70
