= Przemysław Słowikowski =

Polish sprinter (born 1993)

Personal information
- Full name: Przemysław Stefan Słowikowski
- Born: 20 November 1993 (age 32) Gdynia, Poland
- Education: Jędrzej Śniadecki Academy
- Height: 1.87 m (6 ft 2 in)
- Weight: 83 kg (183 lb)

Sport
- Sport: Athletics
- Event: 100 metres
- Club: WKS Flota Gdynia
- Coached by: Rafał Has
Medal record
Men's athletics
Representing Poland
European Championships
Bronze medal – third place	2022 Munich	4×100 m relay
European U23 Championships
Silver medal – second place	2013 Tampere	4 x 100 m
Polish Athletics Championships
Gold medal – first place	2015 Kraków	100 m
Gold medal – first place	2019 Radom	4×100 m relay
Gold medal – first place	2021 Poznań	4×100 m relay
Silver medal – second place	2019 Radom	100 m
Silver medal – second place	2020 Włocławek	100 m
Silver medal – second place	2021 Poznań	100 m
Silver medal – second place	2022 Suwałki	100 m
Bronze medal – third place	2016 Bydgoszcz	100 m
Bronze medal – third place	2018 Lublin	100 m
Bronze medal – third place	2018 Lublin	200 m
Bronze medal – third place	2019 Radom	200 m
Polish Indoor Athletics Championships
Gold medal – first place	2019 Toruń	4×200 m relay
Silver medal – second place	2021 Toruń	60 m
Silver medal – second place	2022 Toruń	60 m
Bronze medal – third place	2014 Sopot	200 m

Przemysław Słowikowski (pronounced [pʐɛˈmɨs.waf swɔ.viˈkɔf.ski]; born 20 November 1993) is a Polish sprinter. He won a silver medal in the 4 × 100 metres relay at the 2013 European U23 Championships.

In August 2022 at the European Athletics Championships in Munich, he was part of the Poland relay team that won a bronze medal in the 4×100 meters relay, establishing a national record.

== International competitions ==
Year	Competition	Venue	Position	Event	Notes
Representing Poland
2012	World Junior Championships	Barcelona, Spain	4th	4 × 100 m relay	39.47
2013	European U23 Championships	Tampere, Finland	2nd	4 × 100 m relay	38.81
2015	European U23 Championships	Tallinn, Estonia	24th (sf)	100 m	29.39
2016	European Championships	Amsterdam, Netherlands	15th (sf)	100 m	10.27
2016	European Championships	Amsterdam, Netherlands	6th	4 × 100 m relay	38.69
2017	World Relays	Nassau, Bahamas	17th (h)	4 × 100 m relay	39.84
2017	World Relays	Nassau, Bahamas	9th (h)	4 × 200 m relay	1:24.78
2017	Universiade	Taipei, Taiwan	35th (h)	100 m	10.65
2017	Universiade	Taipei, Taiwan	–	4 × 100 m relay	DQ
2018	World Cup	London, United Kingdom	7th	4 × 100 m relay	38.91
2018	European Championships	Berlin, Germany	28th (h)	100 m	10.54
2018	European Championships	Berlin, Germany	–	4 × 100 m relay	DQ
2019	World Relays	Yokohama, Japan	–	4 × 100 m relay	DNF
2021	European Indoor Championships	Toruń, Poland	17th (sf)	60 m	6.68
2021	World Relays	Chorzów, Poland	12th (h)	4 × 100 m relay	39.34
2022	World Indoor Championships	Belgrade, Serbia	–	60 m	DQ
2022	European Championships	Munich, Germany	16th (sf)	100 m	10.24
2022	European Championships	Munich, Germany	3rd	4 × 100 m relay	38.15 NR

== Personal bests ==
Outdoor

- 100 metres – 10.19 (+1.6 m/s, Jelenia Góra 2020)
- 200 metres – 20.78 (+0.9 m/s, Gdańsk 2015)

Indoor

- 60 metres – 6.69 (Spała 2018)
- 200 metres – 21.42 (Toruń 2018)
