= Track and field at the 2011 Military World Games – Men's 4 × 100 metres relay =

The men's 4 × 100 metres relay event at the 2011 Military World Games was held on 22 and 23 July at the Estádio Olímpico João Havelange.

== Records ==
Prior to this competition, the existing world and CISM record were as follows:

World Record	Jamaica (Nesta Carter, Michael Frater, Usain Bolt, Asafa Powell)	37.10	Beijing, China	22 August 2008
CISM World Record	Italy (Alessandro Cavallaro, Simone Collio, Rosario La Mastra, Jacques Riparelli)	39.28	Hyderabad, India	October 2007

== Schedule ==
Date	Time	Round
22 July 2011		Semifinals
23 July 2011	10:50	Final

== Medalists ==
Gold	Silver	Bronze
Brazil; Vicente de Lima; Ailson Feitosa; Basílio de Moraes; Nilson André	Poland; Grzegorz Zimniewicz; Kamil Masztak; Robert Kubaczyk; Marcin Marciniszyn	Sri Lanka; Shareef Safran; Ranil Jayawaradena; Gihan Chamara; Shehan Ambepitiya

== Results ==
=== Final ===
Rank	Lane	Nation	Name	Time	Notes
1st place, gold medalist(s)	4	Brazil	Vicente de Lima, Ailson Feitosa, Basílio de Moraes, Nilson André	39.53	
2nd place, silver medalist(s)	5	Poland	Grzegorz Zimniewicz, Kamil Masztak, Robert Kubaczyk, Marcin Marciniszyn	39.63	
3rd place, bronze medalist(s)	3	Sri Lanka	Shareef Safran, Ranil Jayawaradena, Gihan Chamara, Shehan Ambepitiya	40.02	
4	6	Venezuela	Jermaine Chirinos, Diego Rivas, Alvaro Cassiani, Ronald Amaya	40.08	
5	8	India	Hemant Kirulkar, Joseph Mattathil George, Rashid Shameermon, Nitin Kumar	40.70	
6	2	Saudi Arabia	Yahya Habib, Ahmed Almuwallad, Yasir Alnashri, Mohamed Ibrahim	40.71	
7	1	Italy	Stefano Tremigliozzi, Stefano Dacastello, Roberto Donati, Emanuele Di Gregorio	40.72	
	7	Jamaica	Claon Hall, Miguel Barton, Oliver Christie, Marlon Robinson	DNF	
