= 2016 IAAF World Indoor Championships – Men's 60 metres =

Men's 60 metres at the 2016 IAAF World Indoor Championships
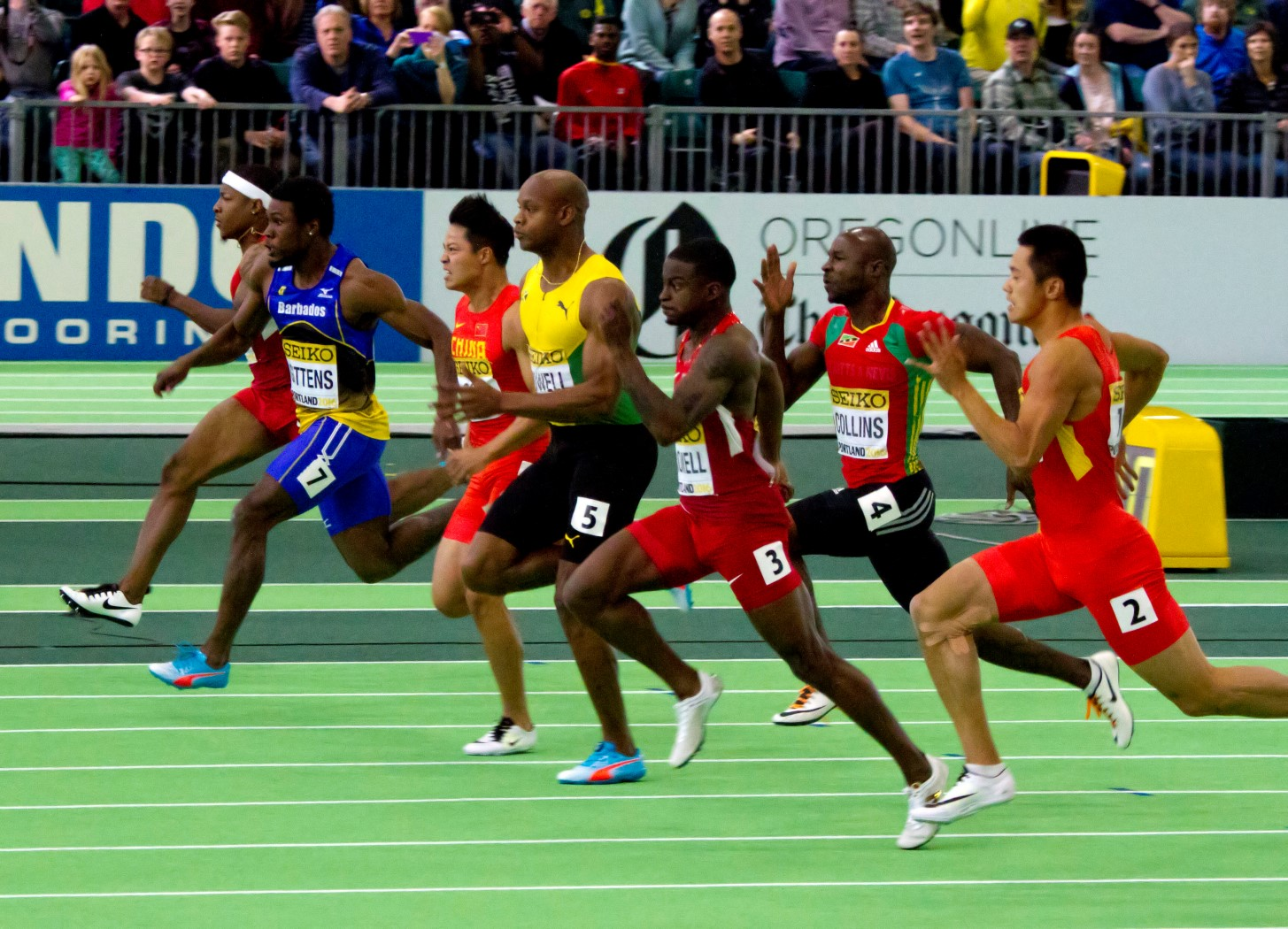
- Venue: Oregon Convention Center
- Dates: March 18
- Competitors: 54 from 47 nations
- Winning time: 6.47

Medalists
gold medal	Trayvon Bromell	United States
silver medal	Asafa Powell	Jamaica
bronze medal	Ramon Gittens	Barbados

Video on YouTube Official Video

The men's 60 metres at the 2016 IAAF World Indoor Championships took place on March 18, 2016.

Asafa Powell has spent a career where he was (until the advent of Usain Bolt), the fastest man in the world, but championships have evaded him. In the opening heats, most athletes try to get to the next round without fully extending themselves. Powell ran his opening heat in 6.44, just .05 off the world record, making him the fifth-fastest athlete in history. More impressive, he noticeably eased up ten meters away from the finish line. It was the Jamaican National Record and the world leading time for 2016. In the semi-final round, Powell repeated the performance with exactly the same time. In the final, that speed wasn't there, instead Trayvon Bromell led from the first step out of the blocks and nobody could catch him. After getting a poor start, Powell made a late rush to capture the silver, still his best individual medal at the world level, edging out Ramon Gittens' national record for bronze.

== Results ==
=== Heats ===
Qualification: First 3 (Q) and next 3 fastest (q) qualified for the semifinals.

Rank	Heat	Name	Nationality	Time	Notes
1	5	Asafa Powell	Jamaica	6.44	Q, WL, NR
2	5	Xie Zhenye	China	6.55	Q, PB
3	1	Kim Collins	Saint Kitts and Nevis	6.56	Q
4	6	Mike Rodgers	United States	6.57	Q
5	3	Trayvon Bromell	United States	6.57	Q
5	7	Marvin Bracy	United States	6.57	Q
7	7	Yoshihide Kiryu	Japan	6.59	Q, PB
8	2	James Dasaolu	Great Britain	6.59	Q
9	1	Ramon Gittens	Barbados	6.61	Q
10	6	Bruno Hortelano	Spain	6.63	Q, PB
11	3	Eric Cray	Philippines	6.64	Q
11	7	Rondel Sorrillo	Trinidad and Tobago	6.64	Q
13	4	Su Bingtian	China	6.64	Q
14	4	Abdullah Abkar Mohammed	Saudi Arabia	6.64	Q, PB
15	6	Hua Wilfried Koffi	Côte d'Ivoire	6.64	Q
16	5	Adrian Griffith	Bahamas	6.65	Q
16	7	Antoine Adams	Saint Kitts and Nevis	6.65	q
18	4	Andrew Robertson	Great Britain	6.66	Q
19	1	Chavaughn Walsh	Antigua and Barbuda	6.66	Q
20	1	Kemar Hyman	Cayman Islands	6.67	q
21	6	Mobolade Ajomale	Canada	6.67	q
22	5	Churandy Martina	Netherlands	6.67	
23	2	Gabriel Mvumvure	Zimbabwe	6.68	Q
24	4	Odain Rose	Sweden	6.69	
25	2	Remigiusz Olszewski	Poland	6.71	Q
26	4	Carlos Nascimento	Portugal	6.71	
27	3	Hensley Paulina	Netherlands	6.73	Q
28	7	Ángel David Rodríguez	Spain	6.74	
29	1	Ogho-Oghene Egwero	Nigeria	6.75	
30	5	Jeremy Dodson	Samoa	6.76	
31	4	Abdul Hamid Abdullah Iswandi	Indonesia	6.77	PB
32	3	Darrell Wesh	Haiti	6.77	
33	4	Mateo Edward	Panama	6.78	SB
34	6	Gérard Kobéané	Burkina Faso	6.80	
35	1	Ján Volko	Slovakia	6.80	
36	5	Brian Kasinda	Zambia	6.80	PB
37	5	Rolando Palacios	Honduras	6.81	SB
38	7	Himasha Eashan Waththakankanamge	Sri Lanka	6.81	PB
39	7	Adam Harris	Guyana	6.82	
40	4	Yancarlos Martínez	Dominican Republic	6.83	
41	3	Andy Martínez	Peru	6.84	PB
42	3	Julius Morris	Montserrat	6.85	
43	1	Rodman Teltull	Palau	6.94	
44	5	Sibusiso Matsenjwa	Swaziland	6.95	SB
45	6	Shaun Gill	Belize	6.99	
46	2	Adel Sesay	Sierra Leone	7.01	
47	2	Shinebayar Damdinchimeg	Mongolia	7.02	
48	6	Jesús Manuel Cáceres	Paraguay	7.05	PB
49	1	Siueni Filimone	Tonga	7.08	
50	6	Syed Muhammad Aoun	Pakistan	7.16	
51	3	Yanis Dallay	Comoros	7.29	
52	7	Emile Condé	Guinea	7.37	SB
53	3	Scheyenne Sanitoa	American Samoa	7.37	
	2	Desmond Kitungwa	Democratic Republic of the Congo	DQ	R162.7
	2	Sean Safo-Antwi	Ghana	DNS	
	2	Mohammed Abukhousa	Palestine	DNS	

=== Semifinals ===
Qualification: First 2 (Q) and next 2 fastest (q) qualified for the final.

Rank	Heat	Name	Nationality	Time	Notes
1	3	Asafa Powell	Jamaica	6.44	Q, =WL, =NR
2	2	Kim Collins	Saint Kitts and Nevis	6.49	Q
3	3	Su Bingtian	China	6.50	Q, =AR
4	2	Mike Rodgers	United States	6.51	Q
5	1	Trayvon Bromell	United States	6.53	Q
6	1	Ramon Gittens	Barbados	6.53	Q
7	3	Marvin Bracy	United States	6.54	q
8	2	Xie Zhenye	China	6.55	q, =PB
9	1	Yoshihide Kiryu	Japan	6.56	PB
10	3	Mobolade Ajomale	Canada	6.60	
11	2	Kemar Hyman	Cayman Islands	6.61	
11	3	Andrew Robertson	Great Britain	6.61	
13	3	Chavaughn Walsh	Antigua and Barbuda	6.61	
14	1	Hua Wilfried Koffi	Côte d'Ivoire	6.63	
15	2	Bruno Hortelano	Spain	6.63	=PB
16	1	Antoine Adams	Saint Kitts and Nevis	6.66	
17	3	Eric Cray	Philippines	6.67	
18	3	Abdullah Abkar Mohammed	Saudi Arabia	6.68	
19	2	Gabriel Mvumvure	Zimbabwe	6.68	
20	1	Rondel Sorrillo	Trinidad and Tobago	6.68	
21	2	Remigiusz Olszewski	Poland	6.71	
22	2	Adrian Griffith	Bahamas	6.71	
23	1	Hensley Paulina	Netherlands	6.73	
	1	James Dasaolu	Great Britain	DQ	R162.7

=== Final ===
The final was started at 20:40.

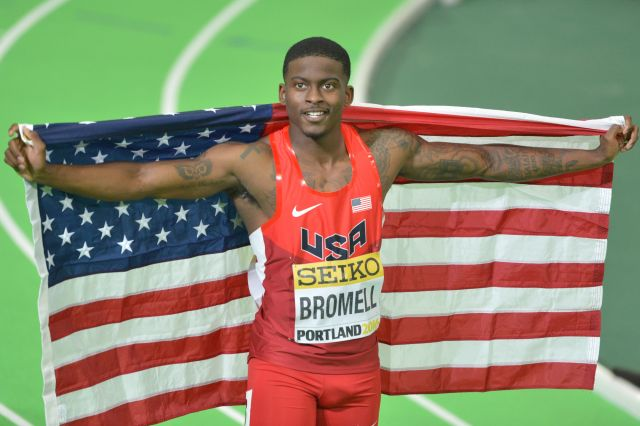
Trayvon Bromell after winning gold

Rank	Lane	Name	Nationality	Time	Notes
1st place, gold medalist(s)	3	Trayvon Bromell	United States	6.47	PB
2nd place, silver medalist(s)	5	Asafa Powell	Jamaica	6.50	
3rd place, bronze medalist(s)	7	Ramon Gittens	Barbados	6.51	NR
4	2	Xie Zhenye	China	6.53	PB
5	6	Su Bingtian	China	6.54	
6	8	Mike Rodgers	United States	6.54	
7	1	Marvin Bracy	United States	6.56	
8	4	Kim Collins	Saint Kitts and Nevis	6.56	
