= Athletics at the 2017 Summer Universiade – Men's 4 × 100 metres relay =

The men's 4 × 100 metres relay event at the 2017 Summer Universiade was held on 27 and 28 August at the Taipei Municipal Stadium.

== Medalists ==
Gold	Silver	Bronze
Japan (JPN); Yusuke Tanaka; Shuhei Tada; Sho Kitagawa; Jun Yamashita	United States (USA); John Lewis III; LeShon Collins; Jacarias Martin; Cameron Burrell	Chinese Taipei; Wei Yi-ching; Yang Chun-han; Cheng Po-yu; Chen Chia-hsun

== Results ==
=== Heats ===
Qualification: The first team in each heat (Q) and the next 4 fastest (q) qualified for the final.

Rank	Heat	Nation	Athletes	Time	Notes
1	2	United States	John Lewis III, LeShon Collins, Jacarias Martin, Cameron Burrell	39.16	Q
2	4	Chinese Taipei	Wei Yi-ching, Yang Chun-han, Cheng Po-yu, Chen Chia-hsun	39.23	Q, SB
3	4	Japan	Yusuke Tanaka, Shuhei Tada, Sho Kitagawa, Jun Yamashita	39.26	q
4	2	Mexico	Heber Gallegos, Iván Moreno, César Ramírez, Juan Carlos Alanís	39.31	q, NR
5	3	Thailand	Kritsada Namsuwan, Bandit Chuangchai, Jirapong Meenapra, Jaran Sathoengram	39.43	Q
6	4	Finland	Eetu Rantala, Oskari Mörö, Samuli Samuelsson, Ville Myllymäki	39.67	q
7	1	Switzerland	Florian Clivaz, Pascal Mancini, Bastien Mouthon, Silvan Wicki	39.77	Q
8	4	Ghana	Godfred Kofitse, Emmanuel Yeboah, Stephen Opoku, Desmond Aryee	39.77	q, SB
9	3	Brazil	Jonathan Mendes, Aldemir da Silva Júnior, Aliffer Júnior dos Santos, Gabriel Constantino	39.80	
10	3	Canada	Ingvar Moseley, Oluwasegun Makinde, Gregory MacNeill, James Linde	40.01	SB
11	2	Trinidad and Tobago	Micah Ballantyne, Moriba Morain, Darren Alfred, Dan-Neil Telesford	40.13	
12	1	Australia	Nicholas Bate, Rohan Browning, Simon Greig, Taylor Burns	40.33	
13	1	Slovakia	Šimon Bujna, Roman Turčáni, Denis Danáč, Ján Volko	40.69	
14	2	Argentina	Oscar Caracassis, Guillermo Ruggeri, Matías Robledo, Jaime Rodríguez	40.83	
15	1	South Korea	Kim Gyeong-tae, Ko Seung-hwan, Hwang Hyeonu, Lee Ji-woo	41.23	
16	3	Sri Lanka	Godayalage Kularathna, Akhila Nilaweera, Agalakada Arachchig, Kavindu Kottahachchi	41.96	SB
	1	Poland	Grzegorz Zimniewicz, Przemysław Słowikowski, Artur Zaczek, Eryk Hampel	DQ	R163.3a
	1	Singapore	Tan Zong Yang, Khairyll Amri Tumadi, Timothee Yap Jin Wei, Calvin Kang Li Loong	DQ	R163.3a
	2	Uganda	Daniel Bingi, Pius Adome, Francis Oketayot, Benson Okot	DQ	R163.3a
	4	Saudi Arabia	Saleh Al-Moselem, Abdulsalam Al-Quraya, Abdullah Al-Shuqayfi, Hassan Al-Onayzan	DQ	R170.7

=== Final ===
Official Video

Rank	Lane	Nation	Athletes	Time	Notes
1st place, gold medalist(s)	7	Japan	Yusuke Tanaka, Shuhei Tada, Sho Kitagawa, Jun Yamashita	38.65	SB
2nd place, silver medalist(s)	6	United States	John Lewis III, LeShon Collins, Jacarias Martin, Cameron Burrell	38.69	
3rd place, bronze medalist(s)	4	Chinese Taipei	Wei Yi-ching, Yang Chun-han, Cheng Po-yu, Chen Chia-hsun	39.06	SB
4	8	Mexico	Heber Gallegos, Iván Moreno, César Ramírez, Juan Carlos Alanís	39.17	NR
5	5	Thailand	Kritsada Namsuwan, Bandit Chuangchai, Jirapong Meenapra, Jaran Sathoengram	39.22	SB
6	1	Ghana	Desmond Aryee, Emmanuel Yeboah, Stephen Opoku, Godfred Kofitse	39.76	
7	2	Finland	Eetu Rantala, Oskari Mörö, Samuli Samuelsson, Ville Myllymäki	40.37	
	3	Switzerland	Florian Clivaz, Pascal Mancini, Silvan Wicki, Bastien Mouthon	DNF	
