= Gabriel Constantino =

Brazilian hurdler (born 1995)

Personal information
- Born: 9 February 1995 (age 31) Rio de Janeiro, Brazil
- Education: Salgado de Oliveira University
- Height: 1.83 m (6 ft 0 in)
- Weight: 80 kg (176 lb)

Sport
- Sport: Athletics
- Events: 110 m hurdles, 60 m hurdles
Medal record
Men's athletics
Representing Brazil
Universiade
Gold medal – first place	2019 Napoles	110 m hurdles

Gabriel Oliveira Constantino (born 9 February 1995) is a Brazilian hurdler. He is the current South American record holder in the 110m hurdles, with a time of 13.18. Constantino finished 6th in the men's 60 metres hurdles at the 2018 IAAF World Indoor Championships. He advanced to the final on time, being the second fastest and final non-automatic qualifier. To qualify for the championships, he equaled at national and South American record of 7.60 seconds.

In 2018, in France, he broke the South American record for 110m hurdles with a time of 13.23. In July 2019, in Hungary, he hit again the South American record of 110m hurdles, with a time of 13.18.

At the 2019 Pan American Games in Lima, Gabriel arrived as a favorite for gold and qualified for the final in 1st place, with a time of 13.42. However, in the final, he tripped over one of the obstacles, finishing in last place.

He competed at the 2020 Summer Olympics.

== Personal bests ==
- 110 m hurdles: 13.18 (wind: +0.8 m/s) – (Hungary) Székesfehérvár, 9 July 2019
- 100 m: 10.28 (wind: +0.6 m/s) – (Brazil) Bragança Paulista, 8 July 2018
- 200 m: 20.21 (wind: +0.9 m/s) – (Brazil) Bragança Paulista, 28 April 2019
- 4 × 100 m relay: 38.33 – (Brazil) Bragança Paulista, 15 September 2018
- 60 m hurdles: 7.60 – (Brazil) São Caetano do Sul, 17 Jan 2018

== International competitions ==
Year	Competition	Venue	Position	Event	Notes
Representing Brazil
2012	South American Youth Championships	Mendoza, Argentina	1st	Long jump	7.35 m
2014	World Junior Championships	Eugene, United States	24th (h)	200 m	21.37
2014	World Junior Championships	Eugene, United States	14th (sf)	110 m hurdles (99 cm)	13.93
2016	Ibero-American Championships	Rio de Janeiro, Brazil	5th	110 m hurdles	13.76
2016	South American U23 Championships	Lima, Peru	3rd	200 m	21.42
2016	South American U23 Championships	Lima, Peru	1st	110 m hurdles	14.10
2016	South American U23 Championships	Lima, Peru	1st	4 × 100 m relay	39.86
2017	Universiade	Taipei, Taiwan	26th (qf)	100 m	10.74
2017	Universiade	Taipei, Taiwan	8th (sf)	110 m hurdles	13.94^{1}
2017	Universiade	Taipei, Taiwan	9th (h)	4 × 100 m relay	39.80
2018	World Indoor Championships	Birmingham, United Kingdom	6th	60 m hurdles	7.71
2018	Ibero-American Championships	Trujillo, Peru	1st	110 m hurdles	13.61
2018	Ibero-American Championships	Trujillo, Peru	1st	4 × 100 m relay	38.78
2019	South American Championships	Lima, Peru	1st	110 m hurdles	13.54
2019	South American Championships	Lima, Peru	2nd	4 × 100 m relay	39.91
2019	Universiade	Naples, Italy	1st	110 m hurdles	13.22
2019	Universiade	Naples, Italy	7th	4 × 100 m relay	1:23.05
2019	Pan American Games	Lima, Peru	1st (h)	110 m hurdles	13.42^{2}
2019	World Championships	Doha, Qatar	–	110 m hurdles	DQ
2020	South American Indoor Championships	Cochabamba, Bolivia	1st	60 m hurdles	7.78
2021	Olympic Games	Tokyo, Japan	22nd (sf)	110 m hurdles	13.89
2022	South American Indoor Championships	Cochabamba, Bolivia	2nd	60 m hurdles	7.78
2022	World Indoor Championships	Belgrade, Serbia	26th (h)	60 m hurdles	7.74
2022	World Championships	Eugene, United States	–	110 m hurdles	DQ
2022	South American Games	Asunción, Paraguay	3rd	110 m hurdles	14.00
2023	World Championships	Budapest, Hungary	25th (h)	110 m hurdles	13.58

^{1}Disqualified in the final
^{2}Did not finish in the final
