= 2011 European Athletics U23 Championships – Men's 4 × 100 metres relay =

The Men's 4x100 metres relay event at the 2011 European Athletics U23 Championships was held in Ostrava, Czech Republic, at Městský stadion on 17 July.

== Medalists ==
Gold	Michael Tumi; Francesco Basciani; Davide Manenti; Delmas Obou; Italy
Silver	Andrew Robertson; Kieran Showler-Davis; Richard Kilty; Danny Talbot; Deji Tobais^{†} United Kingdom
Bronze	Florian Hübner; Maximilian Kessler; Robin Erewa; Felix Göltl; Germany

^{†}: Competed only in heat.

== Results ==
=== Final ===
17 July 2011 / 17:25

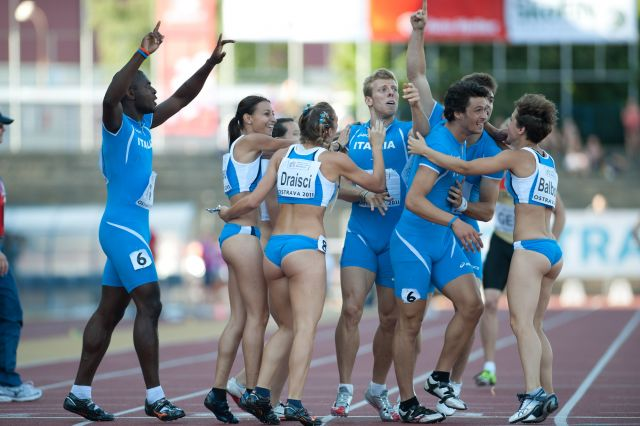
Italian team after winning the gold

Rank	Name	Nationality	Lane	Reaction Time	Time	Notes
1st place, gold medalist(s)	Italy	Michael Tumi; Francesco Basciani; Davide Manenti; Delmas Obou	6	0.157	39.05	
2nd place, silver medalist(s)	United Kingdom	Andrew Robertson; Kieran Showler-Davis; Richard Kilty; Danny Talbot	4	0.164	39.10	
3rd place, bronze medalist(s)	Germany	Florian Hübner; Maximilian Kessler; Robin Erewa; Felix Göltl	3	0.170	39.19	
4	Poland	Mateusz Biegajło; Artur Zaczek; Cezary Bagiński; Grzegorz Zimniewicz	7	0.204	39.40	
5	Czech Republic	Václav Zich; Lukáš Šťastný; Pavel Maslák; Tomáš Kavka	8	0.147	39.41	
6	Netherlands	Wouter Brus; Dennis Spillekom; Erik Stevens; Joeri Jaegers	5	0.161	39.60	
	Greece	Konstadínos Koutsouklákis; Mihaíl Dardaneliótis; Efstrátios Fraggoúlis; Likoúrgos-Stéfanos Tsákonas	2	0.192	DNF	
	France	Benbezi Zeze; Benjamin Georg; Dylan Rigot; Ben Bassaw	1	0.181	DQ	R 170.14

=== Heats ===
Qualified: First 3 in each heat (Q) and 2 best performers (q) advance to the Final

==== Summary ====
Rank	Nation	Time	Notes
1	United Kingdom	39.31	Q
2	Italy	39.45	Q
3	Germany	39.47	Q
4	Czech Republic	39.89	Q
4	Netherlands	39.89	Q
6	Poland	39.96	Q
7	France	39.97	q
8	Greece	40.37	q
9	Sweden	40.45	
	Spain	DNF	

==== Details ====
===== Heat 1 =====
17 July 2011 / 15:45

Rank	Nation	Competitors	Lane	Reaction Time	Time	Notes
1	Germany	Florian Hübner; Maximilian Kessler; Robin Erewa; Felix Göltl	4	0.172	39.47	Q
2	Netherlands	Wouter Brus; Dennis Spillekom; Erik Stevens; Joeri Jaegers	3	0.159	39.89	Q
3	Poland	Mateusz Biegajło; Artur Zaczek; Cezary Bagiński; Grzegorz Zimniewicz	6	0.231	39.96	Q
4	France	Benbezi Zeze; Benjamin Georg; Dylan Rigot; Ben Bassaw	5	0.178	39.97	q
5	Greece	Konstadínos Koutsouklákis; Mihaíl Dardaneliótis; Efstrátios Fraggoúlis; Likoúrgos-Stéfanos Tsákonas	2	0.169	40.37	q

===== Heat 2 =====
17 July 2011 / 15:52

Rank	Nation	Competitors	Lane	Reaction Time	Time	Notes
1	United Kingdom	Andrew Robertson; Kieran Showler-Davis; Richard Kilty; Deji Tobais	5	0.172	39.31	Q
2	Italy	Michael Tumi; Francesco Basciani; Davide Manenti; Delmas Obou	2	0.168	39.45	Q
3	Czech Republic	Václav Zich; Lukáš Šťastný; Pavel Maslák; Tomáš Kavka	4	0.208	39.89	Q
4	Sweden	David Sennung; Oskar Åberg; Alexander Nordkvist; Tom Kling-Baptiste	6	0.147	40.45	
	Spain	Eduard Viles; Iván Jesús Ramos; Sergio Ruiz; Eusebio Cáceres	3	0.164	DNF	

== Participation ==
According to an unofficial count, 41 athletes from 10 countries participated in the event.

- Czech Republic (4)
- France (4)
- Germany (4)
- Greece (4)
- Italy (4)
- Netherlands (4)
- Poland (4)
- Spain (4)
- Sweden (4)
- United Kingdom (5)
