= Diogo Antunes =

Portuguese sprinter (born 1992)

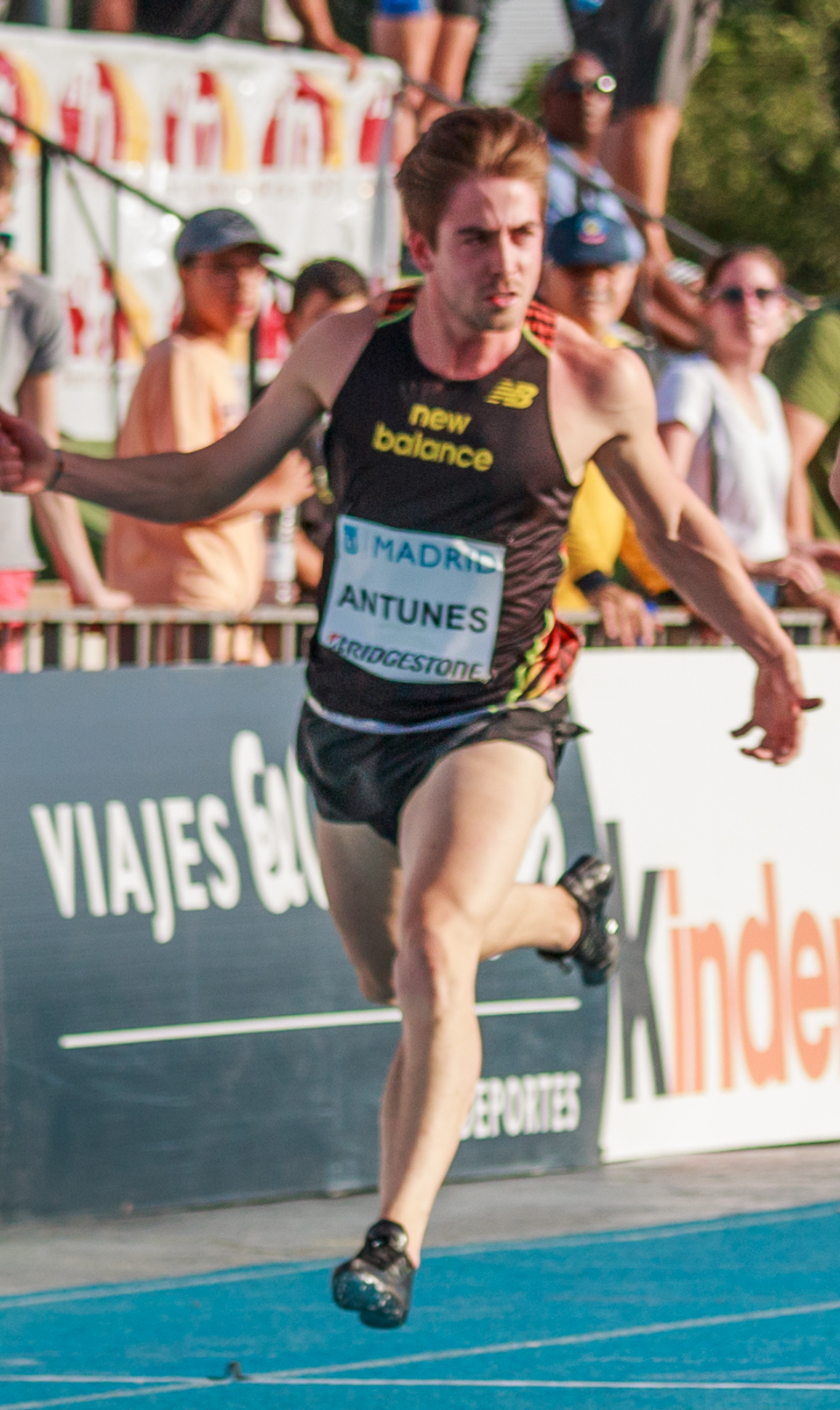
- Diogo Antunes in 2017

Personal information
- Born: 2 November 1992 (age 33) Oeiras, Portugal
- Education: University of Lisbon
- Height: 1.75 m (5 ft 9 in)
- Weight: 72 kg (159 lb)

Sport
- Sport: Athletics
- Event: 100 metres
- Club: Benfica
- Coached by: João Abrantes

Diogo José Pereira de Fortunato Antunes (born 2 November 1992 in Oeiras) is a Portuguese sprinter competing primarily in the 100 metres. He represented his country at three consecutive European Championships.

== International competitions ==
Year	Competition	Venue	Position	Event	Notes
Representing Portugal
2011	European Junior Championships	Tallinn, Estonia	18th (h)	100 m	10.98
2011	European Junior Championships	Tallinn, Estonia	6th	4 × 100 m relay	41.20
2012	European Championships	Helsinki, Finland	6th	4 × 100 m relay	39.96
2013	European Indoor Championships	Gothenburg, Sweden	19th (h)	60 m	6.81
2013	European U23 Championships	Tampere, Finland	12th (h)	100 m	10.62
2013	European U23 Championships	Tampere, Finland	12th (h)	4 × 100 m relay	40.74
2014	European Championships	Zürich, Switzerland	32nd (h)	100 m	10.61
2014	European Championships	Zürich, Switzerland	7th (h)	4 × 100 m relay	38.79^{1}
2015	World Relays	Nassau, Bahamas	18th (h)	4 × 100 m relay	39.42
2015	Universiade	Gwangju, South Korea	–	100 m	DQ
2016	Ibero-American Championships	Rio de Janeiro, Brazil	12th (sf)	100 m	10.50
2016	European Championships	Amsterdam, Netherlands	19th (h)	100 m	10.51
2017	Universiade	Taipei, Taiwan	15th (sf)	100 m	10.54
2018	Mediterranean Games	Tarragona, Spain	4th	100 m	10.41
2018	Mediterranean Games	Tarragona, Spain	3rd	4 × 100 m relay	39.28
2018	European Championships	Berlin, Germany	7th	4 × 100 m relay	39.07
2021	World Relays	Chorzów, Poland	–	4 × 100 m relay	DQ
2021	World Relays	Chorzów, Poland	3rd	4 × 200 m relay	1:24.53

^{1}Did not finish in the final

== Personal bests ==
Outdoor

- 100 metres – 10.20 (+0.7 m/s, Lisbon 2021)
- 200 metres – 21.52 (+0.6 m/s, Lisbon 2014)

Indoor

- 60 metres – 6.67 (Pombal 2016)
- 200 metres – 22.00 (Pombal 2015)
