= Remigiusz Olszewski =

Polish sprinter (born 1992)

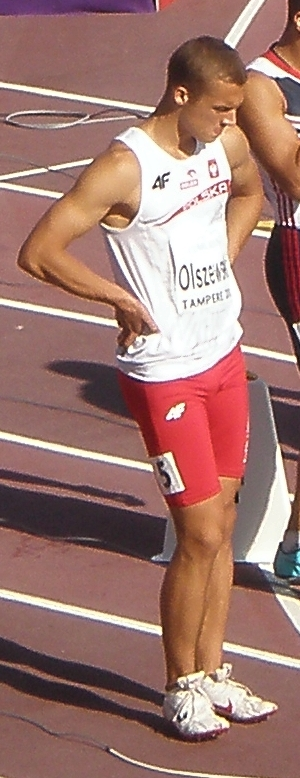
- Remigiusz Olszewski in 2013

Personal information
- Born: 20 September 1992 (age 33) Kaczory, Poland

Sport
- Sport: Athletics
- Event(s): 100 m, 200 m
- Club: KS Gwardia Piła (–2011); SL WKS Zawisza Bydgoszcz (2012); OŚ AZS Poznań (2013–)
- Coached by: Ryszard Olszewski
Medal record
Men's athletics
Representing Poland
European U23 Championships
Silver medal – second place	2013 Tampere	4 x 100 m

Remigiusz Olszewski (born 20 September 1992) is a Polish athlete competing in sprinting events. He represented his country in the 60 metres at the 2014, 2016 and 2018 World Indoor Championships reaching the semifinals on all three occasions.

== Competition record ==
Year	Competition	Venue	Position	Event	Notes
Representing Poland
2010	World Junior Championships	Moncton, Canada	19th (sf)	200 m	21.31 (w)
2013	European U23 Championships	Tampere, Finland	4th	100 m	10.49
2013	European U23 Championships	Tampere, Finland	2nd	4x100 m relay	38.81
2014	World Indoor Championships	Sopot, Poland	18th (sf)	60 m	6.66
2014	IAAF World Relays	Nassau, Bahamas	5th (B)	4x100 m relay	39.31
2015	European Indoor Championships	Prague, Czech Republic	11th (sf)	60 m	6.66
2015	IAAF World Relays	Nassau, Bahamas	19th (h)	4x100 m relay	39.48
2015	IAAF World Relays	Nassau, Bahamas	4th	4x200 m relay	1:22.85
2016	World Indoor Championships	Portland, United States	21st (sf)	60 m	6.71
2016	European Championships	Amsterdam, Netherlands	23rd (sf)	100 m	10.56
2018	World Indoor Championships	Birmingham, United Kingdom	15th (sf)	60 m	6.65
2018	European Championships	Berlin, Germany	=19th (h)	100 m	10.44
2018	European Championships	Berlin, Germany	– (h)	4x100 m relay	DQ
2019	European Indoor Championships	Glasgow, United Kingdom	14th (sf)	60 m	6.72
2019	World Relays	Yokohama, Japan	–	4 × 100 m relay	DNF
2021	European Indoor Championships	Toruń, Poland	6th	60 m	6.66

== Personal bests ==
Outdoor

- 100 metres – 10.21 (+1.8 m/s, Bydgoszcz 2016)
- 200 metres – 20.89 (-0.4 m/s, Kutno 2015)

Indoor

- 60 metres – 6.62 (Toruń 2016)
