= Eetu Rantala =

Finnish sprinter (born 1993)

Eetu Rantala (born 5 June 1993) is a Finnish sprinter who specialized in the 100 metres, 200 metres and 4 × 100 metres relay. He competed at four European Championships, one European Indoor Championships and won three Finnish titles.

== Career ==
He grew up in Oulainen. As a child he practised football and diving, followed by baseball. He joined the club Oulu Pyrinnö at the age of 15, some 100 kilometres away from his home, and was coached by Jukka Vähäkangas. In 2011, he became Finnish junior champion in the 100 metres and Nordic junior champion in the 4 × 100 metres relay; repeating the exact same achievements in 2012. He also competed in the 100 metres at the 2012 European Championships and 2012 World Junior Championships without reaching the final. The Finnish relay team at the 2012 European Championships did not reach the final either, and the Finnish relay team at the 2012 World Junior Championships were disqualified. He ran both events at the 2013 European Team Championships First League, and competed in both events at the 2013 European U23 Championships on home soil in Tampere without reaching the final.

A major improvement of results came between 2013 and 2014. Rantala improved from 6.83 to 6.73 in the 60 metres, in February 2014 in Mustasaari; from 10.54 to 10.30 in the 100 metres, in June 2014 in Lahti; and from 21.75 to 21.08 in the 200 metres, in August 2014 in Kuopio. He took his first and only Finnish indoor title, in the 200 metres, competed at another European Team Championships First League, and became triple Nordic-Baltic U23 champion in the 100, 200 and relay. Notably, all three of Rantala's winning times were new or tied championship records. The next week, Rantala became double Finnish champion in the 100 and 200 metres. He then entered the 2014 European Championships. Running the 100 metres heat in 10.36 was described as a success, though he bowed out in the semi-final, and the relay team did not reach the final either. Lastly, 2014 saw Rantala's first individual start in the Finland–Sweden International, recording a third place in the 100 and fifth in the 200.

During the 2015 indoor season he suffered from mycoplasma. Lacking significant individual achievements over the next years, he did participate in the relay at the 2016 European Championships. After running a personal best in the 60 metres of 6.70 twice, in January and February 2017, he reached the semi-final at the 2017 European Indoor Championships (60 m) and the 2017 Summer Universiade (100 m), finished seventh in the 2017 Summer Universiade relay and at the 2017 Finland–Sweden International (100 m).

2018 saw Rantala win his third and last Finnish title, in the 100 metres in Jyväskylä, three weeks before finishing sixth in the relay at the 2018 European Championships. They finished their heat in 39.11 seconds, a new Finnish record, and reached the final on the grounds of Poland getting disqualified. Their final time of 38.92 seconds was another Finnish record. The team won the Finland–Sweden International in 39.14 seconds, where Rantala also finished sixth in the 100 metres.

A bronze medal at the 2019 Finnish Indoor Championships was his last domestic medal, though he continued competing until 2022. He underwent back surgery in October 2019.

== Personal life ==
In the summer of 2014, he took the entrance tests to the Faculty of Sport and Exercise Science at the University of Jyväskylä.
