= Bruno Hortelano =

Spanish sprinter (born 1991)

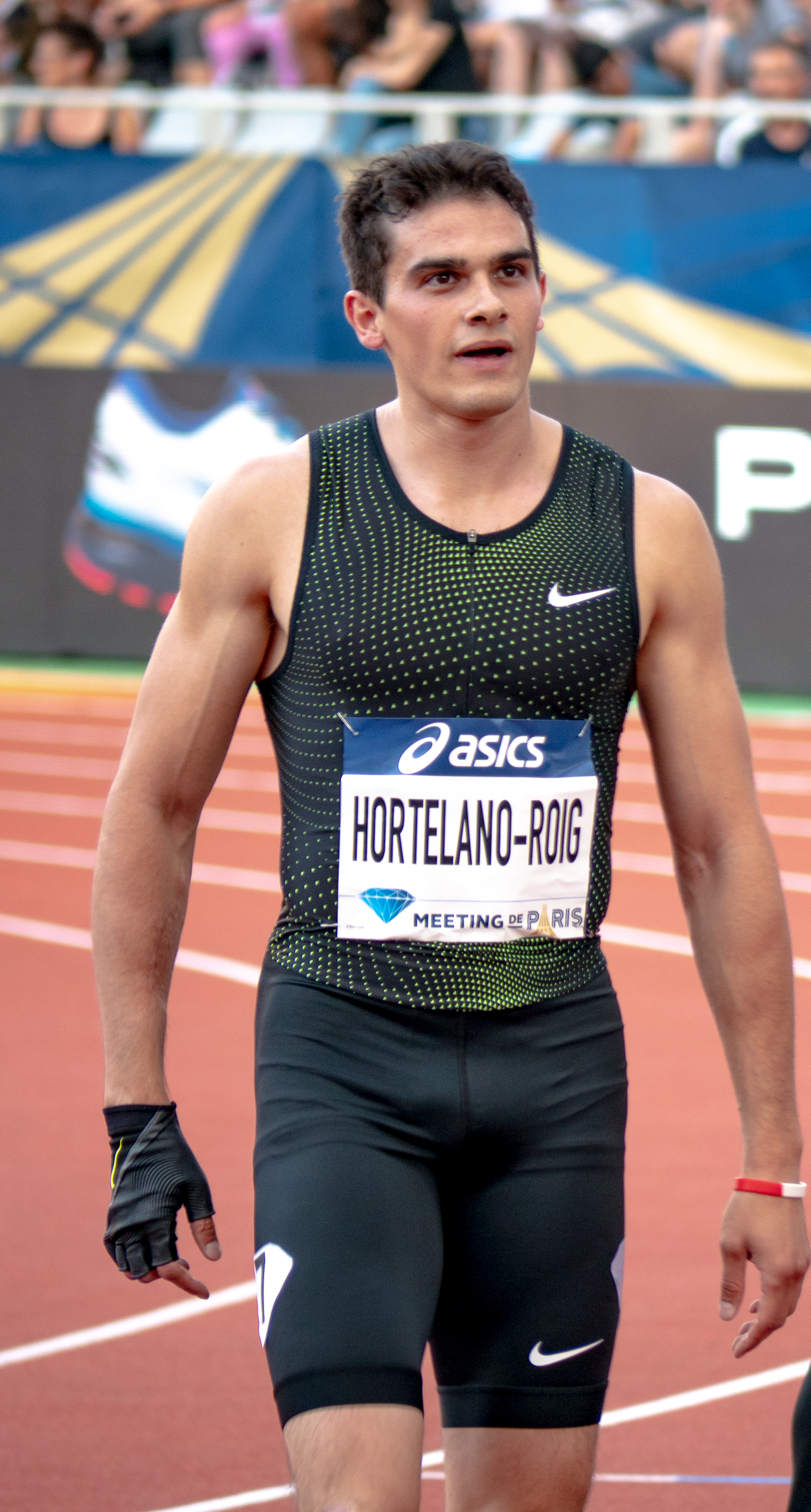
- Hortelano in 2018

Personal information
- Full name: Bruno Dominix Hortelano Roig
- Born: 18 September 1991 (age 34) Wollongong, Australia
- Education: Cornell University
- Height: 1.81 m (5 ft 11 in)
- Weight: 72 kg (159 lb)

Sport
- Sport: Athletics
- Events: 100 m, 200 m
- College team: Cornell Big Red
- Coached by: Adrian Durant
Medal record
World Indoor Championships
| Silver medal – second place | 2022 Belgrade | 4 × 400 m relay |
European Championships
| Gold medal – first place | 2016 Amsterdam | 200 m |
| Bronze medal – third place | 2018 Berlin | 4x400 m relay |
European U23 Championships
| Bronze medal – third place | 2013 Tampere | 4 × 100 m relay |

Bruno Dominix Hortelano Roig (born 18 September 1991) is a Spanish former athlete competing in sprinting events.

== Early life and career ==
Hortelano was born to Spanish parents in Wollongong, Australia, where his father was completing a PhD. After the family moved to Canada in 1992, Hortelano was raised in Burlington, Ontario. His sports interests varied from taekwondo, soccer and, in high school, American football. He was a member of the Burlington Track Club and also competed at high school venues initially contesting the 100 m and later the 110 m hurdles. From 2005 to 2009, he attended Assumption Catholic Secondary School. He was twice named the most valuable sprinter. Hortelano was a finalist in the 100 m at 10.76 in the 2009 OFSSA Provincial Championships, Toronto. That fall, Hortelano was enrolled at Cornell University in Ithaca, New York, where he competed in the Ivy League; a genetics major, he graduated in 2014.

He represented Spain in the 200 metres at the 2013 World Championships, reaching the semifinals after setting a new Spanish record of 20.47 in the heats. At the 2016 European Championships, he won the gold medal after setting a new Spanish record of 20.39 in the semifinals. Later in 2016, at the Summer Olympics in Rio, Hortelano again broke his own national record in the Men's 200 m with a time of 20.12, but failed to qualify for the final.

On 5 September 2016 Hortelano suffered a "catastrophic hand injury" in a drunk driving car accident in Madrid, but made a full recovery with the exception of partial use of his right hand and in 2018 he established a new national record in the 200 and 400 metres.

Hortelano announced his retirement in May 2025.

== International competitions ==
| Year | Competition | Venue | Position | Event | Notes |
Representing Spain
| 2010 | World Junior Championships | Moncton, Canada | 21st (h) | 200 m | 21.51 (Note: Did not start in the semifinals) |
| 2011 | European U23 Championships | Ostrava, Czech Republic | 16th (h) | 100 m | 10.74 |
| 2012 | European Championships | Helsinki, Finland | 18th (sf) | 200 m | 21.35 |
| 2012 | European Championships | Helsinki, Finland | 9th (h) | 4 × 100 m relay | 39.81 |
| 2013 | European U23 Championships | Tampere, Finland | 5th | 200 m | 20.70 |
| 2013 | European U23 Championships | Tampere, Finland | 3rd | 4 × 100 m relay | 38.87 |
| 2013 | European U23 Championships | Tampere, Finland | 5th | 4 × 400 m relay | 3:05.28 |
| 2013 | World Championships | Moscow, Russia | 16th (sf) | 200 m | 20.55 |
| 2013 | World Championships | Moscow, Russia | 9th (h) | 4 × 100 m relay | 38.46 |
| 2016 | World Indoor Championships | Portland, United States | 15th (sf) | 60 m | 6.63 |
| 2016 | Ibero-American Championships | Rio de Janeiro, Brazil | 2nd | 200 m | 20.48 |
| 2016 | Ibero-American Championships | Rio de Janeiro, Brazil | 4th | 4 × 100 m relay | 39.28 |
| 2016 | European Championships | Amsterdam, Netherlands | 4th | 100 m | 10.12 |
| 2016 | European Championships | Amsterdam, Netherlands | 1st | 200 m | 20.45 |
| 2016 | Olympic Games | Rio de Janeiro, Brazil | 10th (sf) | 200 m | 20.12 |
| 2018 | European Championships | Berlin, Germany | 4th | 200 m | 20.05 |
| 2018 | European Championships | Berlin, Germany | 3rd | 4 × 400 m relay | 3:00.78 |
| 2022 | World Indoor Championships | Belgrade, Serbia | 8th (sf) | 400 m | 46.76 |
| 2022 | World Indoor Championships | Belgrade, Serbia | 2nd | 4 × 400 m relay | 3:06.82 |

== Personal bests ==
Outdoor

- 100 metres – 10.06 (+1.0 m/s, Madrid 2016; NR)
- 200 metres – 20.04 (+0.8 m/s, Getafe 2018; NR)
- 400 metres – 44.69 (Madrid 2018; NR)

Indoor

- 60 metres – 6.63 (Portland 2016)
- 200 metres – 20.75 (Albuquerque 2014)
- 400 metres – 47.04 (Hanover, New Hampshire 2014)
