= Roy Schmidt (sprinter) =

German sprinter

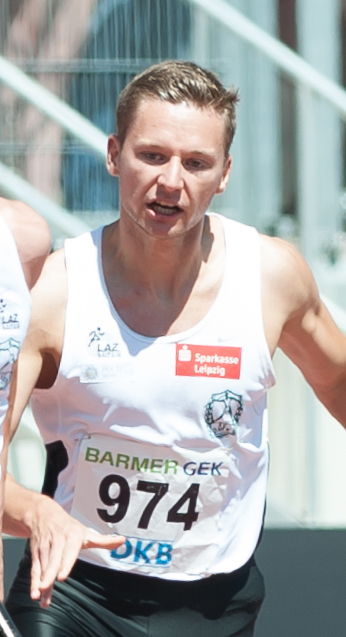
- Roy Schmidt in 2015

Personal information
- Born: 30 September 1991 (age 34) Leipzig, Germany
- Height: 1.83 m (6 ft 0 in)
- Weight: 75 kg (165 lb)

Sport
- Sport: Athletics
- Event(s): 100 m, 200 m
- Club: SC DHfK Leipzig
- Coached by: Ronald Stein

Roy Schmidt (born 30 September 1991 in Leipzig) is a German sprinter. He represented his country in the 4 × 100 metres relay at the 2017 World Championships without qualifying for the final. In addition, he won a bronze medal in the same event at the 2016 European Championships.

== International competitions ==
Year	Competition	Venue	Position	Event	Notes
Representing Germany
2008	World Junior Championships	Bydgoszcz, Poland	22nd (h)	100 m	21.66
2008	World Junior Championships	Bydgoszcz, Poland	–	4 × 100 m relay	DNF
2009	European Junior Championships	Novi Sad, Serbia	7th	200 m	21.44
2009	European Junior Championships	Novi Sad, Serbia	1st	4 × 100 m relay	39.33
2010	World Junior Championships	Moncton, Canada	10th (sf)	200 m	21.25 (w)
2010	World Junior Championships	Moncton, Canada	5th	4 × 100 m relay	39.97
2013	European U23 Championships	Tampere, Finland	17th (h)	100 m	10.74
2013	European U23 Championships	Tampere, Finland	4th	4 × 100 m relay	38.88
2016	European Championships	Amsterdam, Netherlands	3rd	4 × 100 m relay	38.47
2017	World Relays	Nassau, Bahamas	2nd (B)	4 × 100 m relay	39.15
2017	World Championships	London, United Kingdom	10th (h)	4 × 100 m relay	38.66
2019	World Championships	Doha, Qatar	12th (h)	4 × 100 m relay	38.24
2021	World Relays	Chorzów, Poland	–	4 × 100 m relay	DNF

== Personal bests ==
Outdoor

- 100 metres – 10.23 (+0.1 m/s, La Chaux des Fonds 2019)
- 200 metres – 20.85 (+1.8 m/s, Mannheim 2014)

Indoor

- 60 metres – 6.70 (Erfurt 2018)
- 200 metres – 21.16 (Metz 2009)
- 400 metres – 48.97 (Chemnitz 2011)
