= Andrew Robertson (sprinter) =

British athlete (born 1990)

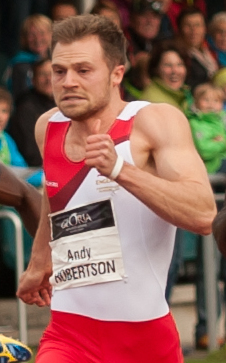
- Andy Robertson in 2015

Personal information
- Born: 17 December 1990 (age 35) Grantham, England
- Height: 1.75 m (5 ft 9 in)
- Weight: 69 kg (152 lb)

Sport
- Sport: Athletics
- Event(s): 60 m, 100 m, 200 m
- Club: Sale Harriers
Medal record
Men's Athletics
Representing Great Britain
European Indoor Championships
Bronze medal – third place	2025 Apeldoorn	60 m
Representing England
Commonwealth Games
Silver medal – second place	2014 Glasgow	4x100 m relay

Andrew Robertson (born 17 December 1990) is an English sprinter.

== Biography ==
Robertson finished third behind Dwain Chambers and Harry Aikines-Aryeetey at the 2013 British Athletics Championships.

He competed in the 60 metres at the 2016 IAAF World Indoor Championships and also at the 2018 IAAF World Indoor Championships over. He is also a two time British indoor champion over 60m.

At the 2025 European Athletics Indoor Championships in Apeldoorn, he won a bronze medal in the 60 metres.

== Competition record ==
Year	Competition	Venue	Position	Event	Notes
Representing Great Britain and England
2007	European Youth Olympic Festival	Belgrade, Serbia	2nd	200 m	21.72
2007	European Youth Olympic Festival	Belgrade, Serbia	1st	4 × 100 m relay	41.62
2009	European Junior Championships	Novi Sad, Serbia	4th	100 m	10.37
2009	European Junior Championships	Novi Sad, Serbia	3rd	4 × 100 m relay	39.78
2011	European U23 Championships	Ostrava, Czech Republic	3rd	100 m	10.52
2011	European U23 Championships	Ostrava, Czech Republic	2nd	4 × 100 m relay	39.10
2014	Commonwealth Games	Glasgow, United Kingdom	4th (h)	4 × 100 m relay	38.78
2015	IAAF World Relays	Nassau, Bahamas	1st (B)	4 × 100 m relay	38.67
2015	European Athletics Team Championships	Cheboksary, Russia	1st	4 × 100 m relay	38.21CR
2016	World Indoor Championships	Portland, United States	11th (sf)	60 m	6.61
2017	European Indoor Championships	Belgrade, Serbia	4th (sf)	60 m	6.63^{1}
2018	World Indoor Championships	Birmingham, United Kingdom	13th (sf)	60 m	6.63
2018	Athletics World Cup	London, United Kingdom	8th	4 × 100 m	38.97
2021	European Indoor Championships	Toruń, Poland	4th	60 m	6.63
2022	World Indoor Championships	Belgrade, Serbia	12th (sf)	60 m	6.64
2025	European Indoor Championships	Apeldoorn, Netherlands	3rd	60 m	6.55
2025	World Indoor Championships	Nanjing, China	58th (h)	60 m	17.86

== Personal bests ==
Outdoor

- 100 metres – 10.10 (+1.9 m/s, Bedford 2014)
- 200 metres – 20.76 (+1.1 m/s, Loughborough 2013)

Indoor

- 60 metres – 6.54 (Sheffield 2016)
