= Markus Fuchs (sprinter) =

Austrian sprinter

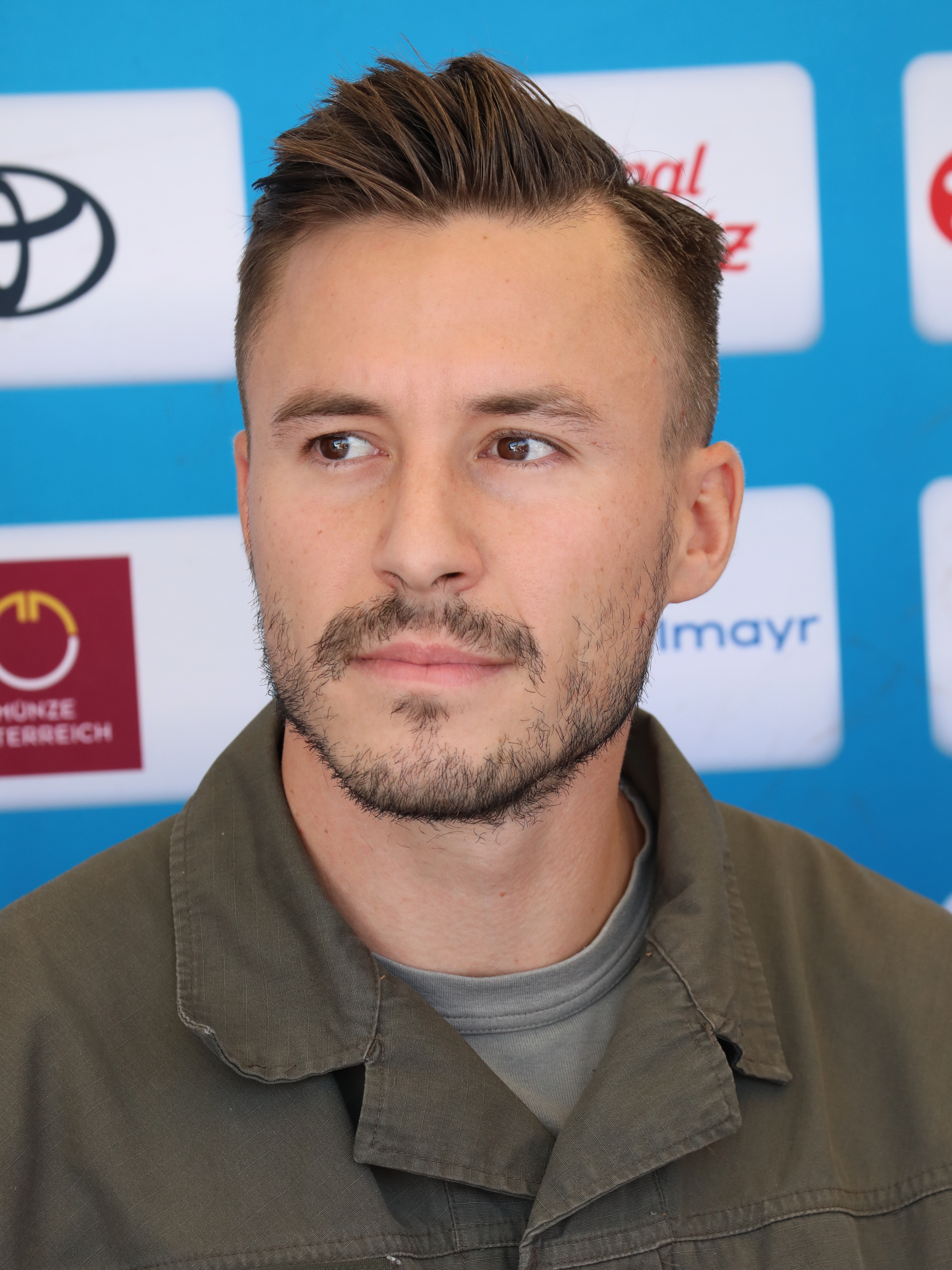
- Fuchs in 2024

Personal information
- Born: 14 November 1995 (age 30)
- Education: University of Vienna
- Height: 1.76 m (5 ft 9 in)
- Weight: 70 kg (154 lb)

Sport
- Sport: Athletics
- Events: 100 m, 200 m
- Club: ULC - Riverside Mödling

Markus Fuchs (born 14 November 1995) is an Austrian sprinter. He represented his country at two outdoor and three indoor European Championships.

== International competitions ==
| Year | Competition | Venue | Position | Event | Notes |
Representing Austria
| 2011 | European Youth Olympic Festival | Trabzon, Turkey | 22nd (h) | 100 m | 11.27 |
| 2015 | European Indoor Championships | Prague, Czech Republic | 29th (h) | 60 m | 6.85 |
| 2015 | European U23 Championships | Tallinn, Estonia | 29th (h) | 100 m | 10.96 |
| 2015 | European U23 Championships | Tallinn, Estonia | 27th (h) | 200 m | 21.99 |
| 2016 | European Championships | Amsterdam, Netherlands | 22nd (h) | 100 m | 10.56 |
| 2017 | European Indoor Championships | Belgrade, Serbia | 22nd (h) | 60 m | 6.84 |
| 2017 | European U23 Championships | Bydgoszcz, Poland | 19th (sf) | 100 m | 10.59 |
| 2017 | European U23 Championships | Bydgoszcz, Poland | – | 200 m | DQ |
| 2017 | Universiade | Taipei, Taiwan | 18th (qf) | 100 m | 10.64 |
| 2017 | Universiade | Taipei, Taiwan | 29th (h) | 200 m | 21.79 |
| 2018 | European Championships | Berlin, Germany | 34th (h) | 100 m | 10.57 |
| 2018 | European Championships | Berlin, Germany | 25th (h) | 200 m | 21.29 |
| 2019 | European Indoor Championships | Glasgow, United Kingdom | 11th (sf) | 60 m | 6.71 |
| 2019 | Universiade | Naples, Italy | 13th (sf) | 100 m | 10.53 |
| 2019 | Universiade | Naples, Italy | 15th (sf) | 200 m | 21.37 |
| 2021 | European Indoor Championships | Toruń, Poland | 38th (h) | 60 m | 6.77 |
| 2022 | World Indoor Championships | Belgrade, Serbia | 28th (h) | 60 m | 6.68 |
| 2022 | European Championships | Munich, Germany | 23rd (sf) | 100 m | 10.42 |
| 2023 | European Indoor Championships | Istanbul, Turkey | 7th | 60 m | 6.59 |
| 2023 | World Championships | Budapest, Hungary | 46th (h) | 100 m | 10.43 |
| 2024 | World Indoor Championships | Glasgow, United Kingdom | 10th (sf) | 60 m | 6.58 |
| 2024 | European Championships | Rome, Italy | 13th (sf) | 100 m | 10.29 |
| 2024 | Olympic Games | Paris, France | 65th (h) | 100 m | 10.59 |
| 2026 | European Championships | Birmingham, United Kingdom | 23rd (h) | 100 m | 10.76 |

== Personal bests ==
Outdoor

- 100 metres – 10.08 (+1.2m/s, St. Polten 2023)
- 200 metres – 20.84 (-1.0 m/s, Weinheim 2018)

Indoor

- 60 metres – 6.58 (Glasgow 2024)
- 200 metres – 21.45 (Vienna 2019)
