= Track and field at the 2011 Military World Games – Men's 100 metres =

The men's 100 metres event at the 2011 Military World Games was held on 19 and 20 and 21 July at the Estádio Olímpico João Havelange.

== Records ==
Prior to this competition, the existing world and CISM record were as follows:

World Record	Usain Bolt (JAM)	9.58	Berlin, Germany	16 August 2009
CISM World Record	Samuel Francis (QAT)	10.10	Hyderabad, India	16 October 2007

== Schedule ==
Date	Time	Round
19 July 2011	18:25	Round 1
20 July 2011	11:15	Semifinals
21 July 2011	16:45	Final

== Medalists ==
Gold	Silver	Bronze
Femi Seun Ogunode; Qatar	Aziz Ouhadi; Morocco	Nilson André; Brazil

== Results ==
=== Final ===
Wind: +0.2 m/s

Rank	Lane	Name	Nationality	Time	Notes
1st place, gold medalist(s)	6	Femi Seun Ogunode	Qatar	10.07	CR
2nd place, silver medalist(s)	3	Aziz Ouhadi	Morocco	10.17	
3rd place, bronze medalist(s)	7	Nilson André	Brazil	10.34	
4	4	Emanuele Di Gregorio	Italy	10.39	
5	1	Robert Kubaczyk	Poland	10.43	
6	8	Yasir Alnashri	Saudi Arabia	10.43	
7	2	Marlon Robinson	Jamaica	10.44	
8	5	Julian Reus	Germany	10.45	
