= Massimiliano Ferraro =

Italian sprinter

Personal information
- National team: Italy
- Born: 6 February 1991 (age 35) Posillipo, Italy
- Height: 1.79 m (5 ft 10 in)
- Weight: 81 kg (179 lb)

Sport
- Sport: Athletics
- Event: Sprinting
- Club: Atletica Riccardi
- Coached by: Stefano Valerio; Fabio Cerutti

Achievements and titles
- Personal best: 100 m: 10.26 (2016)
Medal record
European Team Championships
Bronze medal – third place	2014 Braunschweig	4×100 m relay
Bronze medal – third place	2015 Cheboksary	4×100 m relay

Massimiliano Ferraro (born 6 February 1991) is an Italian sprinter.

== Achievements ==
Year	Competition	Venue	Rank	Event	Time	Notes
2016	European Championships	(Netherlands) Amsterdam	5th	4 × 100 m relay	38.69	

== National titles ==
Ferraro won a national championship at individual senior level.

- Italian Indoor Athletics Championships
  - 60 m: 2017

== See also ==
- Italy at the European Athletics Team Championships
