= Shuhei Tada =

Japanese sprinter (born 1996)

Personal information
- Nationality: Japanese
- Born: 24 June 1996 (age 30) Higashiōsaka, Japan
- Height: 1.76 m (5 ft 9 in)
- Weight: 68 kg (150 lb)

Sport
- Country: Japan
- Sport: Athletics
- Event: 100 metres
Medal record
Men's athletics
Representing Japan
World Championships
Bronze medal – third place	2017 London	4×100 m relay
Bronze medal – third place	2019 Doha	4×100 m relay
Asian Games
Gold medal – first place	2018 Jakarta	4×100 m relay
Asian Indoor Championships
Silver medal – second place	2024 Tehran	60 m
Summer Universiade
Gold medal – first place	2017 Taipei	4×100 m relay

Shuhei Tada (多田 修平, Tada Shūhei; born 24 June 1996) is a Japanese sprinter. He competed in the men's 100 metres at the 2017 World Championships in Athletics. Tada also represented Japan at the 2020 Summer Olympics in Tokyo, competing in the 100 metre and 4x100 metre relay events.

== Personal bests ==
- Information from World Athletics profile unless otherwise noted.

Outdoor

- 100 metres – 10.01 (+2.0 m/s, Tottori 2021)
- 200 metres – 21.72 (+0.9 m/s, Hachioji 2021)

Indoor

- 60 metres – 6.52 (Glasgow 2024) NR
- 200 metres – 22.42 (College Station 2017)
