= Federico Cattaneo =

Italian sprinter (born 1993)

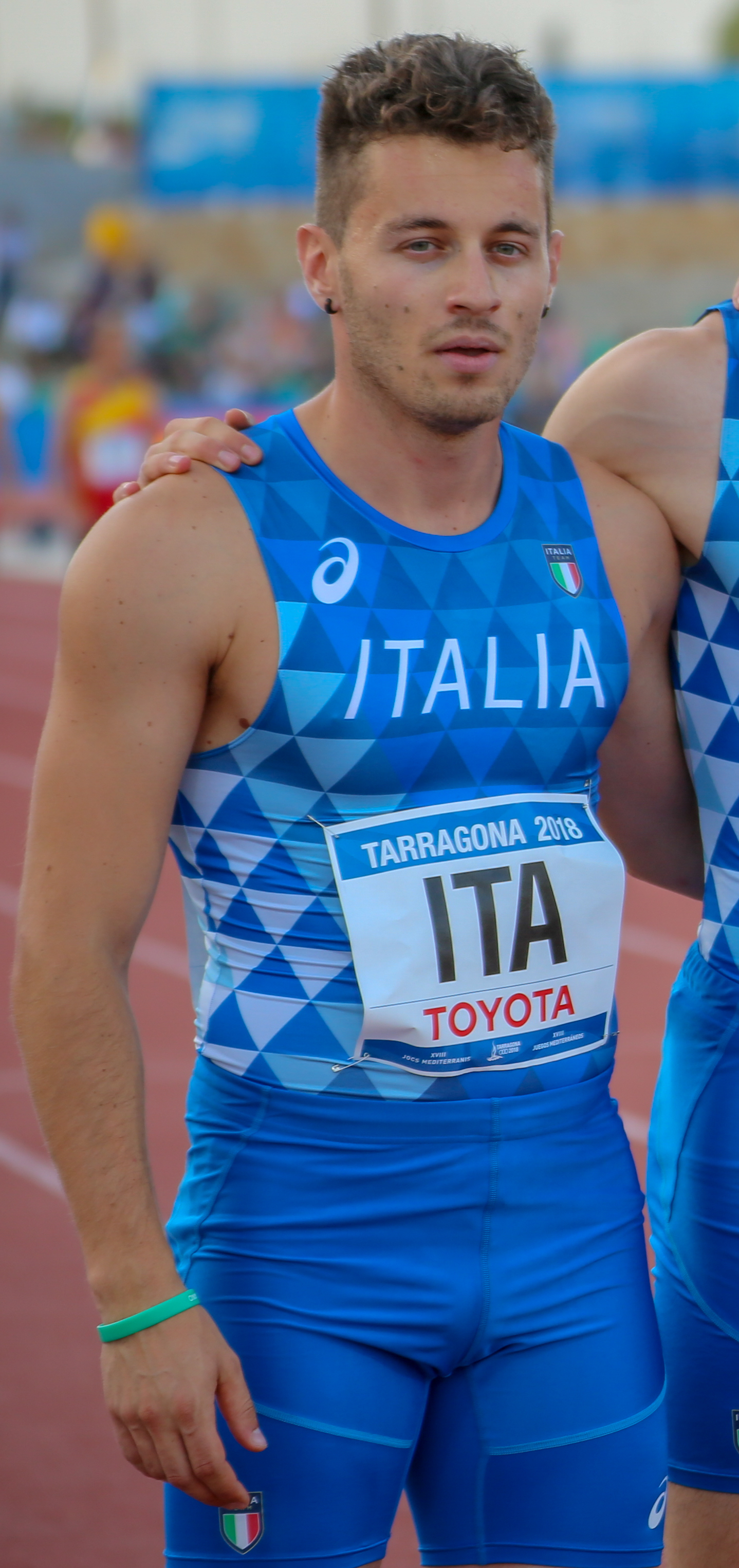
- Federico Cattaneo in 2018

Personal information
- Nationality: Italian
- Born: 14 July 1993 (age 32) Saronno, Italy
- Height: 1.78 m (5 ft 10 in)
- Weight: 72 kg (159 lb)

Sport
- Country: Italy
- Sport: Athletics
- Event: Sprining
- Club: Atletica Riccardi

Achievements and titles
- Personal best: 100 m: 10.28 (2017)
Medal record
Mediterranean Games
Bronze medal – third place	2018 Tarragona	100 m

Federico Cattaneo (born 14 July 1993) is an Italian sprinter who won a bronze medal at the 2018 Mediterranean Games.

== National records ==
- 4×100 m relay: 38.11 ( (Qatar) Doha, 4 October 2019), he ran first leg in the team with Marcell Jacobs, Davide Manenti, Filippo Tortu; former holder

== National titles ==
- Italian Athletics Championships
  - 100 metres: 2017

== See also ==
- Italy at the 2018 Mediterranean Games
- Italy at the 2018 European Athletics Championships
