= 2013 World Youth Championships in Athletics – Boys' 200 metres =

Boys' 200 metres at the 2013 World Youth Championships in Athletics
- Venue: RSC Olimpiyskiy
- Dates: 12 July (heats); 13 July (semifinal); 14 July (final)
- Competitors: 104
- Winning time: 20.63 WYL

Medalists
gold medal	Michael O'Hara	Jamaica
silver medal	Vitor Hugo dos Santos	Brazil
bronze medal	Reynier Mena	Cuba

The boys' 200 metres at the 2013 World Youth Championships in Athletics was held on 12, 13 and 14 July.

== Medalists ==
Gold	Silver	Bronze
Michael O'Hara; Jamaica	Vítor Hugo dos Santos; Brazil	Reynier Mena; Cuba

== Records ==
Prior to the competition, the following records were as follows.

World Youth Best	Usain Bolt (JAM)	20.13	Bridgetown, Barbados	20 July 2003
Championship Record	Usain Bolt (JAM)	20.40	Sherbrooke, Canada	13 July 2003
World Youth Leading	Reynier Mena (CUB)	20.72	Havana, Cuba	28 June 2013

== Heats ==
Qualification rule: first 2 of each heat (Q) next 11 fastest (q) qualified.

=== Heat 1 ===
Rank	Lane	Name	Nationality	Time	Notes
1	1	Llewellyn Hein	South Africa	21.66	Q
2	8	Cameron Nurse	Canada	22.03	
3	3	Sadiki Tyson	Saint Kitts and Nevis	22.27	PB
4	7	Josneyber Ramírez	Venezuela	22.38	
5	2	Mahmoud Hammoudi	Algeria	22.45	
6	6	Vincent Karger	Luxembourg	22.54	
7	5	Douglas Orellana	Guatemala	22.67	PB
8	4	Wong Wai Kin	Hong Kong	23.27	

=== Heat 2 ===
Rank	Lane	Name	Nationality	Time	Notes
1	4	Vitor Hugo dos Santos	Brazil	21.62	Q
2	8	Zak Irwin	Ireland	21.68	q, PB
3	7	Even Meinseth	Norway	22.25	
4	5	Michele Nabacino	Italy	22.37	
5	3	Abdesselam Bouchamia	Algeria	22.61	
6	1	Sean Banda	Zimbabwe	22.70	PB
7	6	Jean Lozereau	Mauritius	22.75	
8	2	Blaž Murn	Slovenia	22.97	

=== Heat 3 ===
Rank	Lane	Name	Nationality	Time	Notes
1	1	Arturo Deliser	Panama	21.62	Q
2	3	Ian Kerr	Bahamas	21.68	q
3	7	Reberto Boyde	Saint Vincent and the Grenadines	21.78	q, PB
4	5	Mohamed Saad Ghali	Bahrain	22.41	PB
5	6	Milorad Stevović	Serbia	22.61	
6	2	Sudirman Hadi	Indonesia	22.65	
7	4	Zayid Al-Siyabi	Oman	22.78	PB
8	8	Kristers Kalniņš	Latvia	22.90	

=== Heat 4 ===
Rank	Lane	Name	Nationality	Time	Notes
1	2	Mo Youxue	China	21.53	Q
2	4	Khalifa Bakhit Bin Jarn	United Arab Emirates	22.06	PB
3	1	Denys Tsven	Ukraine	22.09	PB
4	8	Leonel Carrizo	Argentina	22.55	PB
5	3	Paulus Nghixulu	Namibia	22.76	
6	5	Óscar Sánchez	Spain	22.83	
	7	Jorge Sánchez	Peru	DQ	
	6	Mario Burke	Barbados	DNS	

=== Heat 5 ===
Rank	Lane	Name	Nationality	Time	Notes
1	7	Reuberth Boyde	Saint Vincent and the Grenadines	21.88	Q, PB
2	4	Marek Šefránek	Slovakia	21.94	
3	2	Lee Jeong-tae	South Korea	22.15	
4	8	Alagie Sonko	Gambia	22.30	PB
5	5	Alexis Aguilar	Argentina	22.99	
6	1	Asa Lionel	Saint Lucia	23.02	
	3	Mohamed Fares Jlassi	Tunisia	DNS	
	6	Kenzo Cotton	United States	DNS	

=== Heat 6 ===
Rank	Lane	Name	Nationality	Time	Notes
1	5	Janeko Cartwright	Bahamas	21.57	Q
2	6	Lê Trọng Hinh	Vietnam	21.80	q
3	7	Vincent Basima	Botswana	22.11	
4	8	Haji Ture Beker	Ethiopia	22.35	PB
5	3	Mikhail Litvin	Kazakhstan	22.44	
6	1	Daniel Martínez	Mexico	22.46	
7	2	Mohit	India	22.57	
8	4	Christophe Boulos	Lebanon	22.79	

=== Heat 7 ===
Rank	Lane	Name	Nationality	Time	Notes
1	3	Jonathan Farinha	Trinidad and Tobago	21.46	Q
2	2	Odane Bernard	Jamaica	21.71	q
3	1	Jacob Waqanivalu	Fiji	22.39	
4	6	Leonardo Claro	Venezuela	22.42	
5	4	Antony Mikael	Lebanon	22.68	
6	7	Luis Iriarte	Peru	23.08	
7	5	Abdullah Mohammed Makhreb	Yemen	23.83	PB
	8	Sidiki Ouedraogo	Burkina Faso	DNS	

=== Heat 8 ===
Rank	Lane	Name	Nationality	Time	Notes
1	5	Divine Oduduru	Nigeria	21.24	Q, PB
2	1	Noah Lyles	United States	21.28	q, PB
3	6	Brian Kasinda	Zambia	22.12	PB
4	3	Frederik Schou-Nielsen	Denmark	22.34	
5	2	Yahor Papou	Belarus	22.44	
6	4	Ashish Chhikara	India	23.22	
7	8	Tornike Kvantaliani	Georgia	23.34	
	7	Marko Kovačević	Croatia	DNS	

=== Heat 9 ===
Rank	Lane	Name	Nationality	Time	Notes
1	4	Thomas Somers	Great Britain	21.09	Q, PB
2	1	Daniel Mazón	Spain	21.80	q
3	5	Mantas Šeštokas	Lithuania	22.09	
4	8	Shermar Paul	Canada	22.22	
5	7	Zaid Sadun	Saudi Arabia	22.35	PB
6	2	Kyron McMaster	British Virgin Islands	22.55	
7	3	Saif Khalfan Al-Obaidani	Oman	22.58	SB
8	6	Gregor Kovše	Slovenia	22.86	

=== Heat 10 ===
Rank	Lane	Name	Nationality	Time	Notes
1	4	Michael O'Hara	Jamaica	20.96	Q
2	5	Michael Songore	Zimbabwe	21.60	q, PB
3	7	Lee-Anzo Losper	Namibia	22.19	PB
4	3	Abdulaziz Al-Jadani	Saudi Arabia	22.35	PB
5	1	Samith Arachchige	Sri Lanka	22.62	PB
6	6	Ilya Musatov	Kazakhstan	23.17	
	8	Stanley Mutunga	Kenya	DQ	
	2	Mishal Al-Mutairi	Kuwait	DNS	

=== Heat 11 ===
Rank	Lane	Name	Nationality	Time	Notes
1	5	Reynier Mena	Cuba	20.91	Q
2	4	Aaron Powell	Fiji	21.87	q, PB
3	6	Alkronus Bridgewater	Saint Kitts and Nevis	21.92	q
4	2	Daniel Avendaño	Colombia	22.04	
5	8	Peter Trajkovski	Denmark	22.10	PB
6	7	Viktor Senchuk	Ukraine	22.31	PB
7	3	Carlos Perlaza	Ecuador	22.39	PB
8	1	Nisal Mudiyanselage	Sri Lanka	23.25	

=== Heat 12 ===
Rank	Lane	Name	Nationality	Time	Notes
1	8	Li Zhe	China	21.63	Q
2	1	Richárd Köcse	Hungary	22.09	
3	2	Karabo Mothibi	Botswana	22.47	
4	3	Assan Faye	Gambia	22.48	
5	6	Cristian Radu	Romania	22.58	
6	5	Jean-Eve-Roseline	Seychelles	22.93	
7	4	Roger Sosa	Paraguay	23.26	
	7	Kazuya Yano	Japan	DQ	

=== Heat 13 ===
Rank	Lane	Name	Nationality	Time	Notes
1	8	Ricardo Feliciano	Puerto Rico	21.76	Q
2	4	Ricardo Pereira	Portugal	21.93	q, PB
3	1	Babacar Diop	France	21.99	
4	6	Gabriele Gargano	Italy	22.27	
5	3	Nicolae Gorcea	Romania	22.34	PB
6	5	Tomer Shapira	Israel	22.81	
7	2	Alejandro Araya	Costa Rica	23.44	
	7	Sebastien Clarice	Mauritius	DNS	

== Semifinals ==
Qualification rule: first 2 of each heat (Q) plus the 2 fastest times (q) qualified.

=== Heat 1 ===
Rank	Lane	Name	Nationality	Time	Notes
1	5	Thomas Somers	Great Britain	21.05	Q, PB
2	3	Divine Oduduru	Nigeria	21.13	Q, PB
3	4	Li Zhe	China	21.49	q, PB
4	1	Daniel Mazón	Spain	21.63	
5	7	Zak Irwin	Ireland	21.76	
6	8	Michael Songore	Zimbabwe	21.81	
7	2	Aaron Powell	Fiji	21.96	
	6	Arturo Deliser	Panama	DQ	

=== Heat 2 ===
Rank	Lane	Name	Nationality	Time	Notes
1	4	Michael O'Hara	Jamaica	21.17	Q
2	3	Vítor Hugo dos Santos	Brazil	21.20	Q
3	6	Jonathan Farinha	Trinidad and Tobago	21.36	q
4	7	Noah Lyles	United States	21.58	
5	8	Ian Kerr	Bahamas	21.91	
6	5	Llewellyn Hein	South Africa	21.97	
7	2	Reberto Boyde	Saint Vincent and the Grenadines	22.16	
8	1	Alkronus Bridgewater	Saint Kitts and Nevis	22.60	

=== Heat 3 ===
Rank	Lane	Name	Nationality	Time	Notes
1	3	Reynier Mena	Cuba	21.38	Q
2	4	Mo Youxue	China	21.59	Q
3	7	Odane Bernard	Jamaica	21.66	PB
4	8	Reuberth Boyde	Saint Vincent and the Grenadines	22.02	
5	1	Lê Trọng Hinh	Vietnam	22.12	
6	2	Ricardo Pereira	Portugal	22.20	
7	5	Ricardo Feliciano	Puerto Rico	22.25	
	6	Janeko Cartwright	Bahamas	DNF	

== Final ==
Rank	Lane	Name	Nationality	Time	Notes
1st place, gold medalist(s)	6	Michael O'Hara	Jamaica	20.63	WYL
2nd place, silver medalist(s)	7	Vítor Hugo dos Santos	Brazil	20.67	PB
3rd place, bronze medalist(s)	5	Reynier Mena	Cuba	20.79	
4	4	Thomas Somers	Great Britain	20.84	PB
5	1	Jonathan Farinha	Trinidad and Tobago	21.00	PB
6	3	Ejowvokoghene Oduduru	Nigeria	21.37	
7	8	Mo Youxue	China	21.37	
8	2	Li Zhe	China	21.54	
