= 2014 World Junior Championships in Athletics – Men's 100 metres =

World Junior Championship in Athletics

The men's 100 metres at the 2014 World Junior Championships in Athletics was held at Hayward Field on 22 and 23 July.

== Medalists ==
Gold	Kendal Williams; United States
Silver	Trayvon Bromell; United States
Bronze	Yoshihide Kiryū; Japan

== Records ==
Standing records prior to the 2014 World Junior Championships in Athletics
World Junior Record	Trayvon Bromell (USA)	9.97	Eugene, United States	13 June 2014
Championship Record	Adam Gemili (GBR)	10.05	Barcelona, Spain	11 July 2012
World Junior Leading	Trayvon Bromell (USA)	9.97	Eugene, United States	13 June 2014
Broken records during the 2014 World Junior Championships in Athletics
None

== Results ==
=== Heats ===
Qualification: Best 3 (Q) and next 3 fastest (q) qualify for the next round.

Wind:

Heat 1: +0.4 m/s, Heat 2: +1.4 m/s, Heat 3: +1.0 m/s, Heat 4: −0.2 m/s, Heat 5: +1.1 m/s, Heat 6: +0.7 m/s, Heat 7: −0.5 m/s

Rank	Heat	Name	Nationality	Time	Notes
1	6	Trayvon Bromell	United States	10.13	Q
2	5	Kendal Williams	United States	10.23	Q, PB
3	1	Cejhae Greene	Antigua and Barbuda	10.27	Q, PB
4	2	Jevaughn Minzie	Jamaica	10.32	Q
5	3	Andre Azonwanna	Canada	10.33	Q, PB
6	2	Josh Clarke	Australia	10.36	Q
6	3	Michael O'Hara	Jamaica	10.36	Q
8	1	Jonathan Farinha	Trinidad and Tobago	10.37	Q
8	5	Mo Youxue	China	10.37	Q, SB
10	5	Morten Dalgaard Madsen	Denmark	10.38	Q, PB
11	7	Yoshihide Kiryū	Japan	10.40	Q
12	4	Ojie Edoburun	Great Britain	10.43	Q
13	6	Reuben Arthur	Great Britain	10.44	Q, PB
13	5	Thando Roto	South Africa	10.44	q
15	4	Levi Cadogan	Barbados	10.45	Q
16	2	Takuya Kawakami	Japan	10.46	Q
17	6	Vitor Hugo dos Santos	Brazil	10.49	Q, SB
18	1	Luca Antonio Cassano	Italy	10.50	Q
19	1	Silvan Wicki	Switzerland	10.55	q
20	4	Stanley del Carmen	Dominican Republic	10.56	Q
20	3	Sydney Siame	Zambia	10.56	Q
20	2	Austin Hamilton	Sweden	10.56	q
23	6	Keanu Pennerman	Bahamas	10.57	
24	7	Yaniel Carrero	Cuba	10.58	Q
25	3	Cliff Resias	Bahamas	10.60	
26	5	Simone Pettenati	Italy	10.61	
27	1	Lin Renkeng	China	10.62	
27	1	Kehinde Olubodun	Nigeria	10.62	
29	3	Iván Moreno	Mexico	10.64	
30	4	Himasha Eashan Waththakankanamge	Sri Lanka	10.66	
31	6	John-Mark Constantine	Trinidad and Tobago	10.67	
32	7	Aykut Ay	Turkey	10.71	Q
32	6	Mahmoud Hammoudi	Algeria	10.71	
34	4	Frank Itoya	Spain	10.72	
34	5	Jan Kramberger	Slovenia	10.72	
34	4	Ricardo Pereira	Portugal	10.72	
37	7	Samuli Samuelsson	Finland	10.78	
38	6	Mzamo Mngomezulu	Swaziland	10.84	NJR
39	7	Sebastian Schürman	Germany	10.85	
40	2	Amanuel Abebe	Ethiopia	10.99	
41	3	Peauope Suli Fifita	Tonga	11.00	
42	2	Faresa Kapisi	American Samoa	11.66	
42	3	Reginald Koc	Aruba	11.66	PB
44	5	Tioti Batuao	Kiribati	11.90	PB
45	1	Roy Elwise	Federated States of Micronesia	12.17	PB
46	7	Quentin Leguay	Monaco	12.40	
47	1	Alfreto Quiani	Marshall Islands	13.13	PB
48	4	Cheikh Beya	Mauritania	14.77	PB
	7	Cajuniba Okirua	Cook Islands	DNF	
	4	Arthur Cissé	Ivory Coast	DNS	
	2	Mohammad Azizi	Afghanistan	DNS	
	5	Seco Camara	Guinea-Bissau	DNS	

=== Semifinals ===
Qualification: Best 2 (Q) and next 2 fastest (q) qualify for the next round.

Wind:

Heat 1: 0.0 m/s, Heat 2: −0.3 m/s, Heat 3: -1.6 m/s

Rank	Heat	Name	Nationality	Time	Notes
1	1	Trayvon Bromell	United States	10.29	Q
2	1	Levi Cadogan	Barbados	10.31	Q
3	1	Ojie Edoburun	Great Britain	10.36	q
4	1	Yoshihide Kiryū	Japan	10.38	q
5	2	Cejhae Greene	Antigua and Barbuda	10.39	Q
6	2	Jonathan Farinha	Trinidad and Tobago	10.41	Q
7	2	Jevaughn Minzie	Jamaica	10.43	
8	2	Takuya Kawakami	Japan	10.47	
8	2	Mo Youxue	China	10.47	
10	2	Morten Dalgaard Madsen	Denmark	10.48	
11	3	Kendal Williams	United States	10.49	Q
12	3	Andre Azonwanna	Canada	10.50	Q
13	2	Thando Roto	South Africa	10.61	
14	2	Aykut Ay	Turkey	10.62	
15	1	Austin Hamilton	Sweden	10.64	
16	1	Sydney Siame	Zambia	10.68	
17	1	Michael O'Hara	Jamaica	10.69	
18	3	Yaniel Carrero	Cuba	10.70	
18	1	Luca Antonio Cassano	Italy	10.70	
20	3	Josh Clarke	Australia	10.79	
21	3	Reuben Arthur	Great Britain	10.81	
21	3	Vitor Hugo dos Santos	Brazil	10.81	
23	3	Stanley del Carmen	Dominican Republic	10.92	
24	3	Silvan Wicki	Switzerland	11.14	

=== Final ===
The final was started at 20:50

Wind −0.6

Rank	Lane	Name	Nationality	Time	Notes
1st place, gold medalist(s)	5	Kendal Williams	United States	10.21	PB
2nd place, silver medalist(s)	6	Trayvon Bromell	United States	10.28	
3rd place, bronze medalist(s)	2	Yoshihide Kiryū	Japan	10.34	
4	4	Levi Cadogan	Barbados	10.39	
5	3	Cejhae Greene	Antigua and Barbuda	10.43	
6	1	Ojie Edoburun	Great Britain	10.45	
7	8	Andre Azonwanna	Canada	10.46	
8	7	Jonathan Farinha	Trinidad and Tobago	10.47	
