= Kendal Williams =

American sprinter

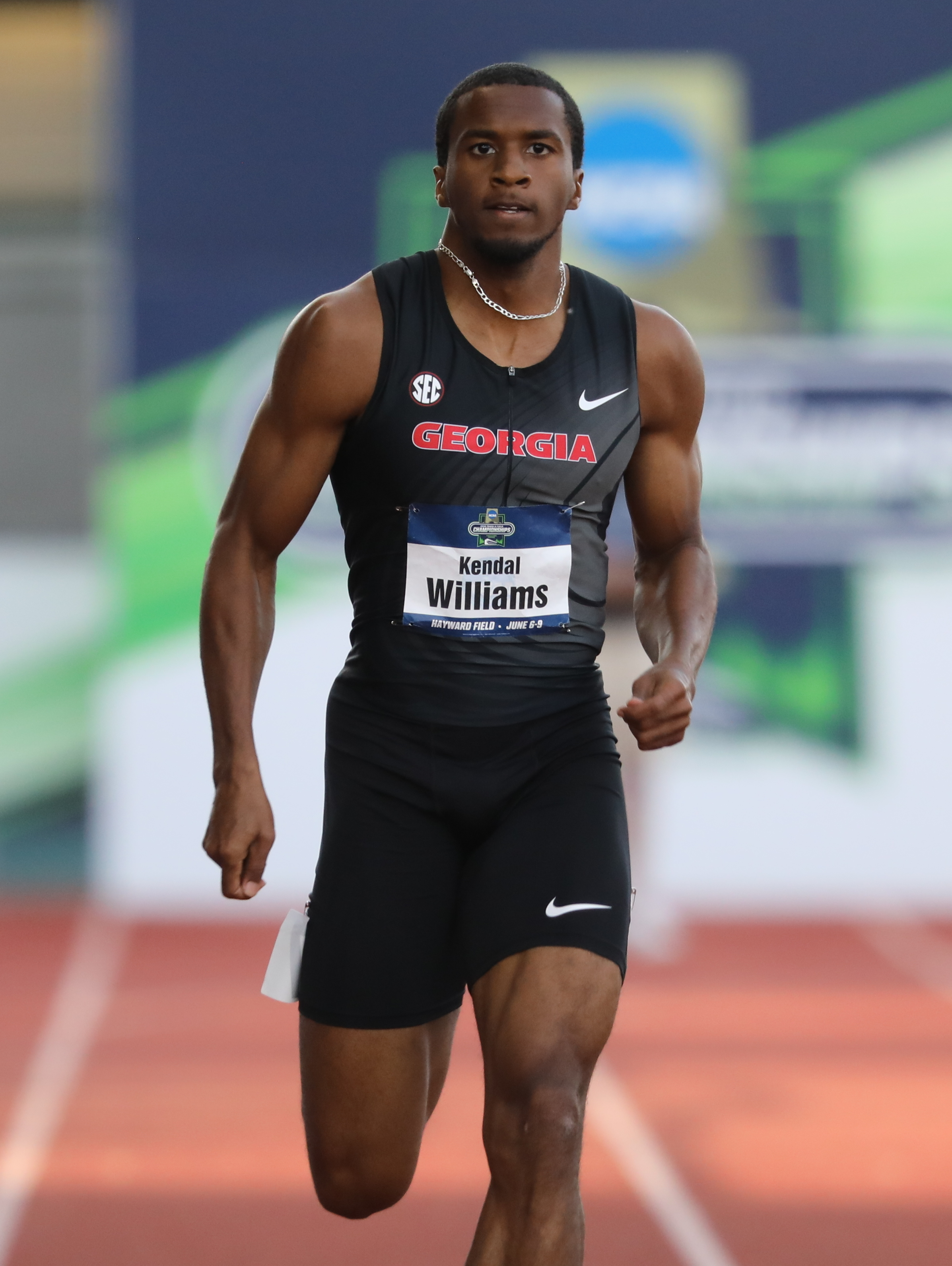
- Williams at the 2018 NCAA Division I Championships

Personal information
- Born: September 23, 1995 (age 30) Jacksonville, Florida, US
- Height: 5 ft 11 in (180 cm)
- Weight: 165 lb (75 kg)

Sport
- Sport: Track and field
- Event: Sprints
- College team: Georgia Bulldogs (2016–2018); Florida State Seminoles (2015)
- Club: PURE Athletics
- Team: adidas
- Turned pro: 2018

Achievements and titles
- Personal bests: 60 m: 6.51 (2017); 100 m: 9.93 (2024); 200 m: 20.15 (2018)
Medal record
Men's athletics
Representing the United States
Athletics World Cup
Gold medal – first place	2018 London	4×100 m relay
Silver medal – second place	2018 London	100 m
Pan American Games
Gold medal – first place	2015 Toronto	4×100 m relay
NACAC Championships
Silver medal – second place	2018 Toronto	100 m
NACAC U23 Championships
Gold medal – first place	2016 San Salvador	100 m
Gold medal – first place	2016 San Salvador	4×100 m relay
World Junior Championships
Gold medal – first place	2014 Oregon	100 m
Gold medal – first place	2014 Oregon	4×100 m relay

Kendal Williams (born September 23, 1995) is an American professional track and field athlete specializing in the sprints. Representing the United States at the 2014 World Junior Championships in Athletics, he earned gold medals in the 100 meters and the 4 × 100 m relay, upsetting teammate and favorite Trayvon Bromell in the 100 m who had earlier that year become the first junior to break the 10-second barrier.

Williams attended Stanton College Preparatory School where he won multiple state titles and was a high school All-American. He went to Florida State University on scholarship in 2014 and competed for the Seminoles in 2015, placing second in the Atlantic Coast Conference Championships 100 m with a wind-assisted 9.98 seconds run as a freshman. However he transferred to the University of Georgia after his freshman year, following coach Ken Harnden whose contract had not been renewed by Florida State.

In his senior year at Georgia he clocked a 9.99 s run, this time with allowable wind, in the Southeastern Conference Championships 100 m to win and set a new personal best. He did not progress out of his heat at the NCAA Division I Championships, but he went on to make the final at the USA Championships, finishing third in his last race representing the Bulldogs. He went on to represent the United States at the inaugural Athletics World Cup, earning a silver medal in the 100 m and a gold medal in the 4 × 100 m relay.

== Statistics ==
- Information from World Athletics profile.

=== Personal bests ===
Event	Time	Wind (m/s)	Venue	Date	Notes
60 m	6.51	—N/a	Clemson, South Carolina, US	February 17, 2017	Indoor
100 m	9.93	+2.0	Clermont, Florida, US	May 11, 2024	
100 m	9.98 w	+2.1	Tallahassee, Florida, US	May 16, 2015	Wind-assisted
200 m	20.15	+0.8	Knoxville, Tennessee, US	May 13, 2018	
200 m	20.11 w	+3.3	Eugene, Oregon, US	July 7, 2016	Wind-assisted
4×100 m relay	38.27	—N/a	Toronto, Ontario, Canada	July 25, 2015	
4×200 m relay	1:20.88	—N/a	Gainesville, Florida, US	30 March 2019	

=== International championship results ===
Representing the United States
Year	Competition	Venue	Position	Event	Time	Wind (m/s)	Notes
2014	World Junior Championships	Eugene, Oregon, US	1st	100 m	10.21	−0.6	PB
2014	World Junior Championships	Eugene, Oregon, US	16th	200 m	21.10	+1.9	
2014	World Junior Championships	Eugene, Oregon, US	1st	4×100 m relay	38.70	—N/a	WJL, PB
2015	Pan American Games	Toronto, Ontario, Canada	1st	4×100 m relay	38.27	—N/a	PB
2016	NACAC U23 Championships	San Salvador, El Salvador	1st	100 m	10.23	−0.9	
2016	NACAC U23 Championships	San Salvador, El Salvador	1st	4×100 m relay	38.63	—N/a	
2018	Athletics World Cup	London, England	2nd	100 m	10.05	+0.3	
2018	Athletics World Cup	London, England	1st	4×100 m relay	38.42	—N/a	
2018	NACAC Championships	Toronto, Ontario, Canada	2nd	100 m	10.11	+0.4	
2018	NACAC Championships	Toronto, Ontario, Canada	DNF	4×100 m relay	—	—N/a	Dropped baton

=== National championship results ===
Representing the 1st Coast Track Club (2011–2014), Florida State Seminoles (2015), Georgia Bulldogs (2016–2018), and adidas (2019–2022)
Year	Competition	Venue	Position	Event	Time	Wind (m/s)	Notes
2011	US World Youth Trials	Myrtle Beach, South Carolina	4th	100 m	10.79	−2.8	
2011	US World Youth Trials	Myrtle Beach, South Carolina	4th	200 m	21.31	+1.4	
2011	USATF Youth Championships (born 1995–1996)	Myrtle Beach, South Carolina	1st	200 m	21.46	−1.5	
2011	USATF Youth Championships (born 1995–1996)	Myrtle Beach, South Carolina	1st	100 m	10.73	−0.5	
2011	USATF Youth Championships (born 1995–1996)	Myrtle Beach, South Carolina	4th	400 m	50.50	—N/a	PB
2012	USATF Junior Championships	Bloomington, Indiana	10th	100 m	10.68	−0.9	
2012	USATF Junior Championships	Bloomington, Indiana	5th	200 m	21.11	+0.1	
2013	USATF Junior Championships	Des Moines, Iowa	6th	100 m	10.88	−4.8	
2013	USATF Junior Championships	Des Moines, Iowa	DQ (semis)	200 m	—	−3.4	Lane violation
2014	USATF Junior Championships	Eugene, Oregon	2nd	100 m	10.27	+1.2	PB
2014	USATF Junior Championships	Eugene, Oregon	2nd	200 m	20.46 w	+2.9	Wind-assisted
2015	NCAA Division I Indoor Championships	Fayetteville, Arkansas	9th	60 m	6.62	—N/a	
2015	NCAA Division I Outdoor Championships	Eugene, Oregon	5th	100 m	9.98 w	+2.7	Wind-assisted
2015	NCAA Division I Outdoor Championships	Eugene, Oregon	8th	200 m	20.45 w	+2.4	Wind-assisted
2015	NCAA Division I Outdoor Championships	Eugene, Oregon	9th	4×100 m relay	39.48	—N/a	
2015	USATF Championships	Eugene, Oregon	10th	100 m	9.98 w	+3.7	Wind-assisted
2016	US Olympic Trials	Eugene, Oregon	10th	100 m	10.04 w	+2.7	Wind-assisted
2016	US Olympic Trials	Eugene, Oregon	7th	200 m	20.38	+1.6	
2017	NCAA Division I Indoor Championships	College Station, Texas	5th	60 m	6.60	—N/a	
2017	NCAA Division I Championships	Eugene, Oregon	21st	100 m	10.50	+1.3	
2018	NCAA Division I Indoor Championships	College Station, Texas	7th	60 m	6.65	—N/a	
2018	NCAA Division I Championships	Eugene, Oregon	16th	100 m	10.16	−0.9	
2018	NCAA Division I Championships	Eugene, Oregon	3rd	200 m	20.32	0.0	
2018	USATF Championships	Des Moines, Iowa	3rd	100 m	10.00	+1.1	
2019	USATF Championships	Des Moines, Iowa	10th	100 m	10.33	−0.1	
2021	US Olympic Trials	Eugene, Oregon	18th	100 m	10.15	+1.9	SB
2022	2022 USA Outdoor Track and Field Championships	Eugene, Oregon	9th	100 m	10.03	+1.4	
2022	2022 USA Outdoor Track and Field Championships	Eugene, Oregon	15th	200 m	20.79	+1.2	

- NCAA results from Track & Field Results Reporting System.

=== Seasonal bests ===
Year	60 meters	100 meters	200 meters
2011	—	10.51	21.16
2012	6.81	10.48	20.89
2013	6.71	10.28	20.64
2014	—	10.21	20.55
2015	6.56	10.07	20.26
2016	6.63	10.06	20.31
2017	6.51	10.06	20.30
2018	6.61	9.99	20.15
2019	—	10.03	—
2020	—	10.14	21.07
2021	6.78	10.15	—
