= 2017 European Athletics U23 Championships – Men's 4 × 100 metres relay =

The men's 4 × 100 metres relay event at the 2017 European Athletics U23 Championships was held in Bydgoszcz, Poland, at Zdzisław Krzyszkowiak Stadium on 16 July.

== Medalists ==
Gold	Silver	Bronze
Germany; Roger Gurski; Kai Köllmann; Philipp Trutenat; Daniel Hoffmann; Deniz Almas*	Great Britain; Theo Etienne; Kyle de Escofet; Reuben Arthur; Ojie Edoburun	Finland; Willem Kajander; Oskari Lehtonen; Samuli Samuelsson; Aleksi Lehto

*Athletes who ran in heats only

== Results ==
=== Heats ===
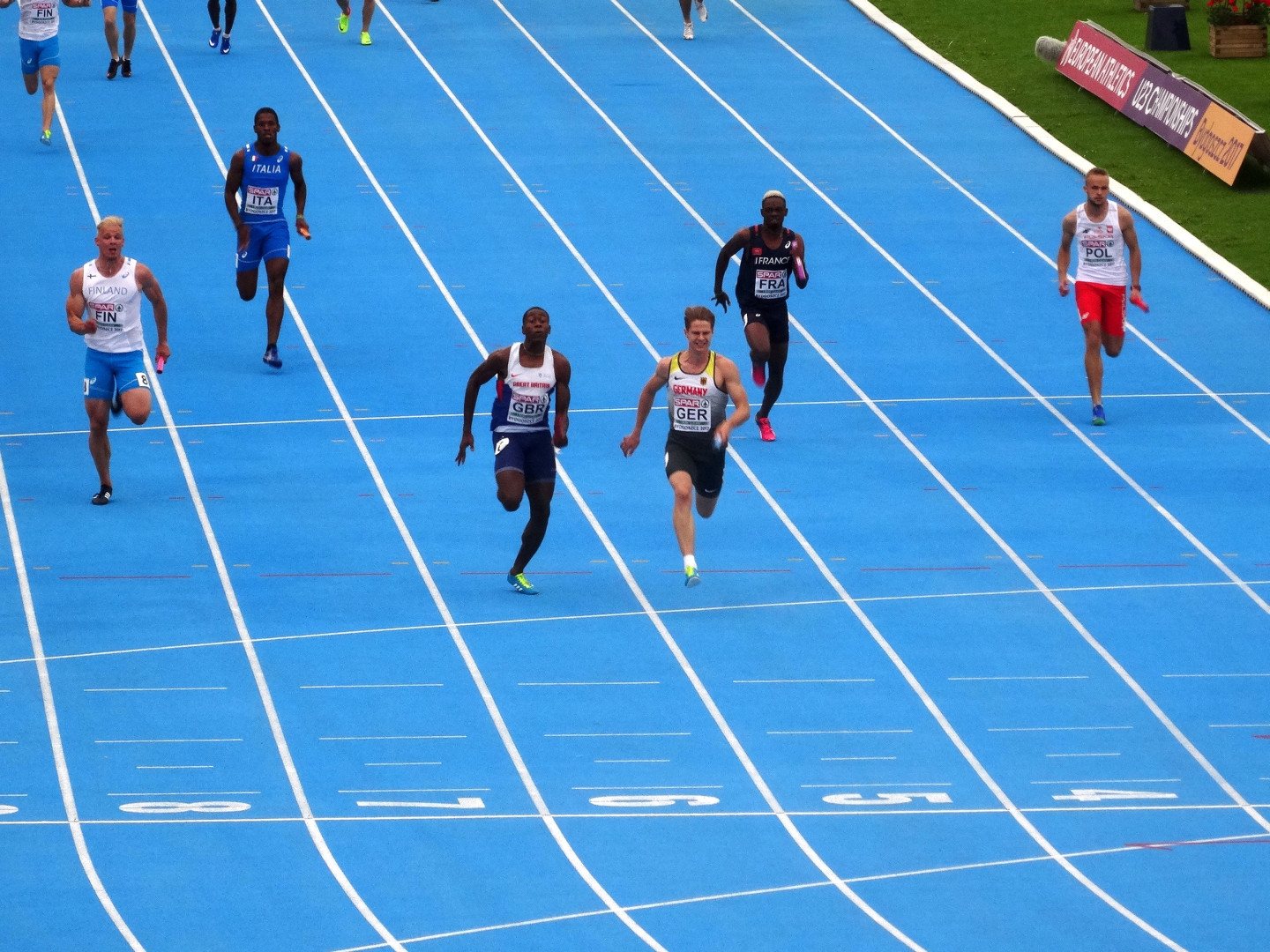
The final

16 July

Qualification rule: First 3 in each heat (Q) and the next 2 fastest (q) qualified for the final.

Rank	Heat	Nation	Athletes	Time	Notes
1	2	Germany	Roger Gurski, Kai Köllmann, Deniz Almas, Daniel Hoffmann	38.91	Q
2	2	France	Amaury Golitin, Gautier Dautremer, Hachim Maaroufou, Marvin René	39.36	Q
3	1	Great Britain	Theo Etienne, Kyle de Escofet, Reuben Arthur, Ojie Edoburun	39.45	Q
4	2	Portugal	José Lopes, Rafael Jorge, Ricardo Pereira, Ricardo Ribeiro	39.55	Q
5	1	Italy	Luca Antonio Cassano, Jacopo Spanò, Lodovico Cortelazzo, Hillary Wanderson Polanco Rijo	39.69	Q
6	1	Finland	Willem Kajander, Oskari Lehtonen, Samuli Samuelsson, Aleksi Lehto	39.78	Q
7	1	Poland	Artur Wasilewski, Przemysław Adamski, Dominik Kopeć, Karol Kwiatkowski	39.96	q
8	2	Hungary	Zsolt Pázmándi, Bence Boros, Péter Balogh, Richárd Köcse	40.04	q
9	1	Romania	Ioan Pitigoi, Ioan Andrei Melnicescu, Gabriel Petre, Petre Rezmives	40.09	
10	2	Denmark	Sebastian Ree Pedersen, Frederik Schou-Nielsen, Kojo Musah, Kristoffer Hari	40.12	
11	1	Turkey	Ertan Özkan, Fatih Aktaş, Abdülkadir Gögalp, Aykut Ay	40.49	
	1	Sweden	Emil von Barth, Austin Hamilton, Felix Svensson, Jakob Lindbom	DNF	
	2	Ukraine	Roman Kravtsov, Danylo Kurta, Yuriy Storozh, Oleksandr Sokolov	DQ	R170.7
	2	Czech Republic	Dominik Záleský, Jáchym Procházka, Jiří Kubeš, Vojtěch Kolarčík	DQ	R162.7

=== Final ===
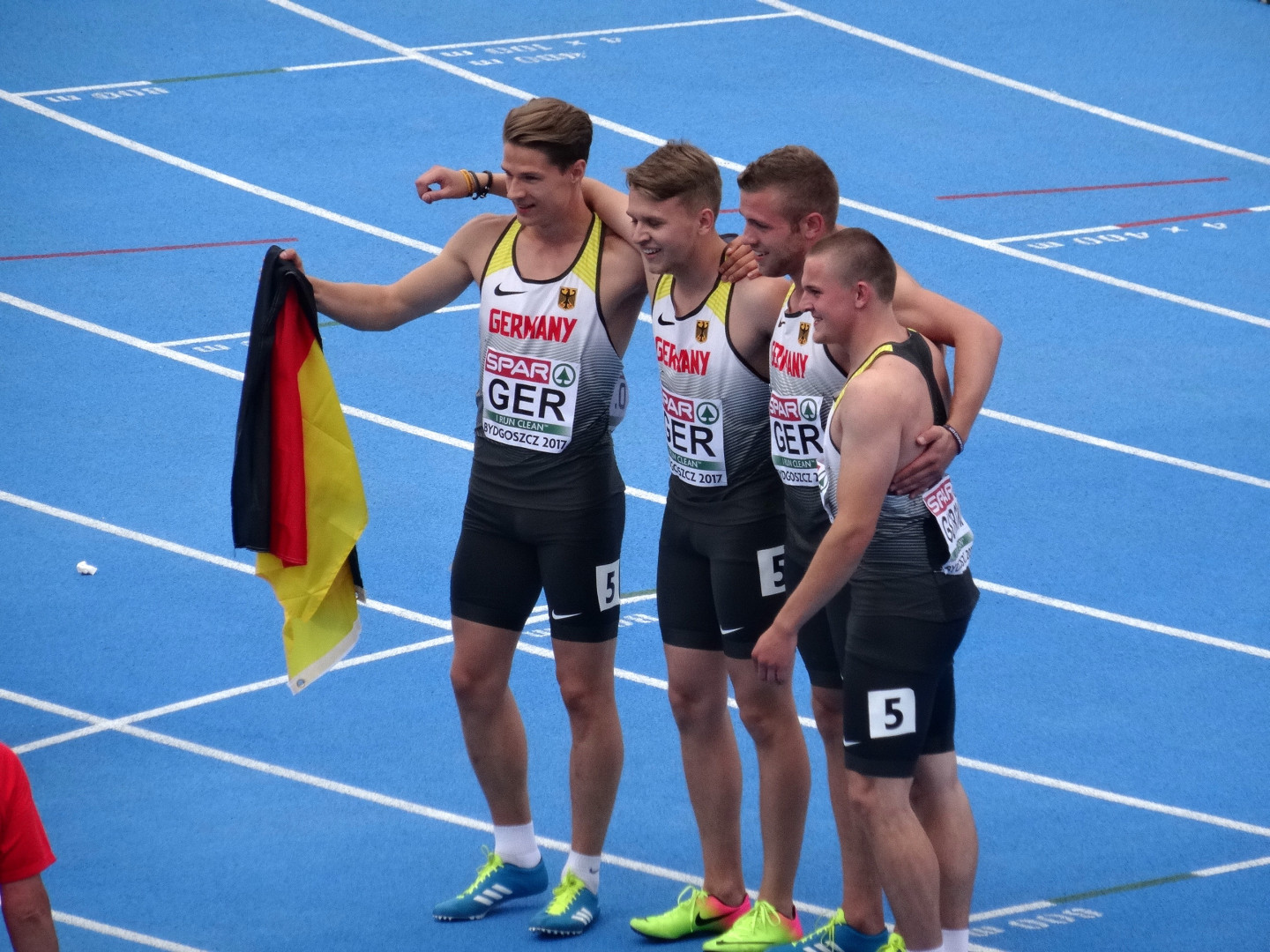
The winning German team

16 July

Rank	Lane	Nation	Athletes	Time	Notes
1st place, gold medalist(s)	5	Germany	Roger Gurski, Kai Köllmann, Philipp Trutenat, Daniel Hoffmann	39.11	
2nd place, silver medalist(s)	6	Great Britain	Theo Etienne, Kyle de Escofet, Reuben Arthur, Ojie Edoburun	39.11	
3rd place, bronze medalist(s)	8	Finland	Willem Kajander, Oskari Lehtonen, Samuli Samuelsson, Aleksi Lehto	39.70	
4	4	France	Amaury Golitin, Gautier Dautremer, Hachim Maaroufou, Marvin René	39.86	
5	9	Portugal	José Lopes, Rafael Jorge, Ricardo Pereira, Ricardo Ribeiro	39.88	
6	2	Poland	Karol Kwiatkowski, Przemysław Adamski, Dominik Kopeć, Eryk Hampel	40.11	
7	3	Hungary	Zsolt Pázmándi, Bence Boros, Péter Balogh, Richárd Köcse	50.97	
	7	Italy	Luca Antonio Cassano, Jacopo Spanò, Andrea Federici, Hillary Wanderson Polanco Rijo	DQ	R170.7
