= 2014 World Junior Championships in Athletics – Men's 4 × 100 metres relay =

The men's 4 x 100 metres relay event at the 2014 World Junior Championships in Athletics was held in Eugene, Oregon, USA, at Hayward Field on 25 and 26 July.

== Medalists ==
Gold	Jalen Miller; Trayvon Bromell; Kendal Williams; Trentavis Friday; United States
Silver	Takuya Kawakami; Yoshihide Kiryū; Yuki Koike; Masaharu Mori; Japan
Bronze	Raheem Robinson; Michael O'Hara; Edward Clarke; Jevaughn Minzie; Jamaica

== Records ==
Standing records prior to the 2014 World Junior Championships in Athletics
World Junior Record	United States (Trell Kimmons, Abidemi Omole, Ivory Williams, LaShawn Merritt)	38.66	Grosseto, Italy	18 July 2004
Championship Record	United States (Trell Kimmons, Abidemi Omole, Ivory Williams, LaShawn Merritt)	38.66	Grosseto, Italy	18 July 2004
World Junior Leading	(Jamaica) Calabar High School	39.35	Kingston, Jamaica	29 March 2014
Broken records during the 2014 World Junior Championships in Athletics

== Results ==
=== Final ===
26 July
Start time: 17:35 Temperature: 31 °C Humidity: 26 %

Rank	Name	Nationality	Lane	Reaction Time	Time	Notes
1st place, gold medalist(s)	United States	Jalen Miller; Trayvon Bromell; Kendal Williams; Trentavis Friday	5	0.154	38.70	WJL
2nd place, silver medalist(s)	Japan	Takuya Kawakami; Yoshihide Kiryū; Yuki Koike; Masaharu Mori	4	0.157	39.02	SB
3rd place, bronze medalist(s)	Jamaica	Raheem Robinson; Michael O'Hara; Edward Clarke; Jevaughn Minzie	6	0.174	39.12	SB
4	China	Mo Youxue; Liang Jinsheng; Lin Renkeng; Li Zhe	3	0.168	39.51	NJR
5	Nigeria	Omeiza John Akerele; Tega Odele; Ini-Oluwa Victor Oye; Ejowvokoghene Divine Oduduru	1	0.170	39.66	SB
6	Trinidad and Tobago	Holland Cabara; Jonathan Farinha; Micah Ballantyne; John Mark Constantine	7	0.188	39.92	SB
7	Australia	Josh Clarke; Jesse Usoalii; Jacob Despard; Anthony Collum	2	0.126	40.09	SB
	Thailand	Teerasak Sunthanon; Kacha Sawangyen; Natthawut Chuchuai; Pooriphat Kaijun	8	0.152	DNF	

=== Heats ===
25 July
First 2 in each heat (Q) and the next 2 fastest (q) advance to the Final

==== Summary ====
Rank	Nation	Time	Notes
1	Japan	39.23	Q WJL
2	United States	39.43	Q SB
3	Nigeria	39.67	q SB
4	China	39.75	Q SB
5	Jamaica	39.86	Q
6	Australia	40.18	q SB
7	Thailand	40.24	Q
8	Trinidad and Tobago	40.32	Q
9	Bahamas	40.45	
10	Botswana	40.53	SB
11	Norway	40.62	NJR
12	South Africa	40.64	SB
13	Poland	40.68	
14	Turkey	41.18	SB
15	Barbados	41.39	SB
	United Kingdom	DNF	
	Canada	DQ	170.7
	Italy	DQ	170.7
	Zimbabwe	DNS	

==== Details ====
First 2 in each heat (Q) and the next 2 fastest (q) advance to the Final

===== Heat 1 =====
26 July
Start time: 18:35 Temperature: 28 °C Humidity: 33%

Rank	Nation	Competitors	Lane	Reaction Time	Time	Notes
1	China	Mo Youxue; Liang Jinsheng; Lin Renkeng; Li Zhe	3	0.155	39.75	Q SB
2	Thailand	Teerasak Sunthanon; Kacha Sawangyen; Natthawut Chuchuai; Pooriphat Kaijun	2	0.131	40.24	Q
3	Botswana	Thabiso Sekgopi; Baboloki Thebe; Leungo Scotch; Karabo Mothibi	6	0.173	40.53	SB
4	Poland	Tomasz Mudlaff; Jacek Kabaciński; Marcin Talacha; Dominik Kopeć	7	0.184	40.68	
5	Turkey	Miktat Kaya; Miraç Semerci; Fatih Aktas; Aykut Ay	5	0.188	41.18	SB
	United Kingdom	Reuben Arthur; Roy Ejiakuekwu; Chris Stone; Marvin Popoola	4	0.146	DNF	

===== Heat 2 =====
26 July
Start time: 18:50 Temperature: 28 °C Humidity: 33%

Rank	Nation	Competitors	Lane	Reaction Time	Time	Notes
1	Japan	Takuya Kawakami; Yoshihide Kiryū; Yuki Koike; Masaharu Mori	3	0.167	39.23	Q WJL
2	United States	Jalen Miller; Trayvon Bromell; Terry Jerrigan; Michael Wells	5	0.147	39.43	Q SB
3	Nigeria	Kehinde Olubodun; Tega Odele; Ini-Oluwa Victor Oye; Ejowvokoghene Divine Oduduru	6	0.174	39.67	q SB
4	Australia	Josh Clarke; Jesse Usoalii; Jacob Despard; Anthony Collum	7	0.159	40.18	q SB
5	Barbados	Rivaldo Leacock; Levi Cadogan; Michael Nicholls; Jerrad Mason	2	0.209	41.39	SB
	Canada	Stevens Dorcelus; Andre Azonwanna; Mobolade Ajomale; Deion Barker	4	0.143	DQ	170.7

Note:
IAAF Rule 170.7 - Passing the baton outside the takeover zone

===== Heat 3 =====
26 July
Start time: 18:56 Temperature: 28 °C Humidity: 33%

Rank	Nation	Competitors	Lane	Reaction Time	Time	Notes
1	Jamaica	Waseem Williams; Raheem Robinson; Edward Clarke; Raheem Chambers	5	0.175	39.86	Q
2	Trinidad and Tobago	Holland Cabara; Micah Ballantyne; Akanni Hislop; John Mark Constantine	2	0.190	40.32	Q
3	Bahamas	Keanu Pennerman; Cliff Resias; Deedro Clarke; Javan Martin	7	0.187	40.45	
4	Norway	Even Meinseth; Amund Høie Sjursen; Jonathan Quarcoo; Karsten Warholm	4	0.153	40.62	NJR
5	South Africa	Sonwabiso Skhosana; Eckhardt Rossouw; Jon Seeliger; Thando Roto	3	0.179	40.64	SB
	Italy	Luca Antonio Cassano; Jacopo Spanò; Roberto Rigali; Simone Pettenati	8	0.162	DQ	170.7
	Zimbabwe		6		DNS	

Note:
IAAF Rule 170.7 - Passing the baton outside the takeover zone

== Participation ==
According to an unofficial count, 78 athletes from 18 countries participated in the event.

- Australia (4)
- Bahamas (4)
- Barbados (4)
- Botswana (4)
- Canada (4)
- China (4)
- Italy (4)
- Jamaica (6)
- Japan (4)
- Nigeria (5)
- Norway (4)
- Poland (4)
- South Africa (4)
- Thailand (4)
- Trinidad and Tobago (5)
- Turkey (4)
- United Kingdom (4)
- United States (6)
