= Athletics at the 2018 Commonwealth Games – Men's 4 × 100 metres relay =

Men's 4 × 100 metres relay at the 2018 Commonwealth Games
- Venue: Carrara Stadium
- Dates: 13 April (heats); 14 April (final)
- Nations: 15
- Winning time: 38.13

Medalists
gold medal	Reuben Arthur; Zharnel Hughes; Richard Kilty; Harry Aikines-Aryeetey	England
silver medal	Henricho Bruintjies; Emile Erasmus; Anaso Jobodwana; Akani Simbine	South Africa
bronze medal	Everton Clarke; Oshane Bailey; Warren Weir; Yohan Blake; Nigel Ellis	Jamaica

The men's 4 × 100 metres relay at the 2018 Commonwealth Games, as part of the athletics programme, took place in the Carrara Stadium on 13 and 14 April 2018.

== Records ==
Prior to this competition, the existing world and Games records were as follows:

World record	Jamaica (Nesta Carter, Michael Frater, Yohan Blake, Usain Bolt)	36.84	London, United Kingdom	11 August 2012
Games record	Jamaica (Jason Livermore, Kemar Bailey-Cole, Nickel Ashmeade, Usain Bolt)	37.58	Glasgow, Scotland	2 August 2014

== Schedule ==
The schedule was as follows:

Date	Time	Round
Friday 13 April 2018	11:05	First round
Saturday 14 April 2018	14:40	Final

All times are Australian Eastern Standard Time (UTC+10)

== Results ==
=== First round ===
The first round consisted of two heats. The three fastest teams per heat (plus two fastest losers) advanced to the final.

Heat 1

Rank	Nation	Athletes	Result	Notes	Qual.
1	South Africa	Henricho Bruintjies; Emile Erasmus; Anaso Jobodwana; Akani Simbine	38.71		Q
2	Australia	Trae Williams; Rohan Browning; Jack Hale; Josh Clarke	38.78	SB	Q
3	Sri Lanka	Himasha Eashan; Shehan Ambepitiya; Mohamed Ashrafu; Vinoj De Silva	39.47		Q
4	The Gambia	Ebrahima Camara; Abdoulie Asim; Assan Faye; Adama Jammeh	40.57		
–	Trinidad and Tobago	Keston Bledman; Marc Burns; Nathan Farinha; Emmanuel Callender	DQ	R 170.6c	
–	Antigua and Barbuda		DNS		
–	Ghana		DNS		
–	Kenya		DNS		

Heat 2

Rank	Nation	Athletes	Result	Notes	Qual.
1	England	Reuben Arthur; Zharnel Hughes; Richard Kilty; Harry Aikines-Aryeetey	38.15		Q
2	Jamaica	Everton Clarke; Nigel Ellis; Oshane Bailey; Yohan Blake	38.44		Q
3	Nigeria	Enoch Olaoluwa Adegoke; Usheoritse Itsekiri; Ogho-Oghene Egwero; Seye Ogunlewe	38.52		Q
4	Barbados	Shane Brathwaite; Ramon Gittens; Nicholas Deshong; Burkheart Ellis Jr	38.95	SB	q
5	Malaysia	Nixson Anak Kennedy; Jonathan Nyepa; Badrul Hisham Abdul Manap; Khairul Hafiz Jantan	39.39		q
6	Fiji	Samuela Railoa; Aaron Powell; Eugene Vollmer; Petero Veitaqomaki	42.09		
–	Canada	Sam Effah; Bismark Boateng; Oluwasegun Makinde; Gavin Smellie	DQ	R 170.7	

=== Final ===
The medals were determined in the final.

Rank	Lane	Nation	Athletes	Result	Notes
1st place, gold medalist(s)	6	England	Reuben Arthur; Zharnel Hughes; Richard Kilty; Harry Aikines-Aryeetey	38.13	SB
2nd place, silver medalist(s)	5	South Africa	Henricho Bruintjies; Emile Erasmus; Anaso Jobodwana; Akani Simbine	38.24	NR
3rd place, bronze medalist(s)	3	Jamaica	Everton Clarke; Oshane Bailey; Warren Weir; Yohan Blake	38.35	SB
4	4	Australia	Trae Williams; Rohan Browning; Jack Hale; Josh Clarke	38.58	SB
5	1	Barbados	Shane Brathwaite; Ramon Gittens; Nicholas Deshong; Burkheart Ellis Jr	39.04	
6	8	Sri Lanka	Himasha Eashan; Shehan Ambepitiya; Mohamed Ashrafu; Vinoj De Silva	39.08	NR
7	2	Malaysia	Nixson Anak Kennedy; Jonathan Nyepa; Badrul Hisham Abdul Manap; Khairul Hafiz Jantan	39.37	
–	7	Nigeria	Ogho-Oghene Egwero; Usheoritse Itsekiri; Emmanuel Arowolo; Seye Ogunlewe	DQ	R 170.6c
