= 2017 European Athletics U23 Championships – Men's 100 metres =

The men's 100 metres event at the 2017 European Athletics U23 Championships was held in Bydgoszcz, Poland, at Zdzisław Krzyszkowiak Stadium on 13 and 14 July.

== Medalists ==
Gold	Ojie Edoburun; Great Britain
Silver	Ján Volko; Slovakia
Bronze	Jonathan Quarcoo; Norway

== Records ==
Prior to the competition, the records were as follows:

European U23 record	Christophe Lemaitre (FRA)	9.92	Albi, France	29 July 2011
Championship U23 record	Simeon Williamson (GBR)	10.10	Debrecen, Hungary	13 July 2007

== Results ==
=== Heats ===
13 July

Qualification rule: First 3 (Q) and the next 6 fastest (q) qualified for the semifinals.

Wind:
Heat 1: +0.9 m/s, Heat 2: +1.2 m/s, Heat 3: +0.5 m/s, Heat 4: +1.0 m/s, Heat 5: +1.5 m/s, Heat 6: +1.0 m/s

Rank	Heat	Name	Nationality	Time	Notes
1	5	Ján Volko	Slovakia	10.23	Q
2	5	Dominik Záleský	Czech Republic	10.31	Q, PB
3	1	Samuli Samuelsson	Finland	10.34	Q
4	5	Austin Hamilton	Sweden	10.36	Q
5	5	Luca Antonio Cassano	Italy	10.36	q, PB
6	4	Ojie Edoburun	Great Britain	10.37	Q
7	1	Marvin René	France	10.43	Q
8	3	Jonathan Quarcoo	Norway	10.44	Q
9	2	Joseph Dewar	Great Britain	10.48	Q
10	2	Kojo Musah	Denmark	10.48	Q, =PB
11	4	Hillary Wanderson Polanco Rijo	Italy	10.51	Q
12	6	Reuben Arthur	Great Britain	10.51	Q
13	1	Dominik Kopeć	Poland	10.52	Q
14	4	Petre Rezmives	Romania	10.54	Q
15	5	José Lopes	Portugal	10.54	q
16	2	Daniel Hoffmann	Germany	10.55	Q
17	6	Amaury Golitin	France	10.56	Q
18	2	Ioan Andrei Melnicescu	Romania	10.56	q
19	4	Markus Fuchs	Austria	10.57	q
20	3	Manuel Eitel	Germany	10.58	Q
21	3	Rafael Jorge	Portugal	10.59	Q
22	1	Emil von Barth	Sweden	10.61	q
23	1	Ricardo Pereira	Portugal	10.62	q
24	6	Sylvain Chuard	Switzerland	10.63	Q
25	4	Przemysław Adamski	Poland	10.67	
26	3	Danylo Kurta	Ukraine	10.67	
27	3	Frederik Schou-Nielsen	Denmark	10.67	
28	5	Dániel Szabó	Hungary	10.68	
29	2	Abdülkadir Gögalp	Turkey	10.72	
30	4	Kolbeinn Hödur Gunnarsson	Iceland	10.73	
31	6	Kristoffer Hari	Denmark	10.74	
32	1	Fatih Aktaş	Turkey	10.74	
33	6	Desmond Rogo	Sweden	10.76	
34	4	Aleksa Kijanović	Serbia	10.78	
35	2	Damir Redžepagić	Bosnia and Herzegovina	10.79	
36	2	Jakub Matúš	Slovakia	10.81	
37	5	Luke Bezzina	Malta	10.88	
38	1	Raitis Fomrats	Latvia	10.99	PB
39	6	Aykut Ay	Turkey	10.99	
40	6	Vojtěch Kolarčík	Czech Republic	11.03	
41	6	Sean Collado	Gibraltar	11.71	

=== Semifinals ===
13 July

Qualification rule: First 2 (Q) and the next 2 fastest (q) qualified for the final.

Wind:
Heat 1: +1.6 m/s, Heat 2: +0.8 m/s, Heat 3: +1.5 m/s

Rank	Heat	Name	Nationality	Time	Notes
1	3	Ján Volko	Slovakia	10.18	Q
2	2	Ojie Edoburun	Great Britain	10.26	Q
2	2	Jonathan Quarcoo	Norway	10.26	Q, NU23R
4	3	Austin Hamilton	Sweden	10.34	Q, PB
5	3	Reuben Arthur	Great Britain	10.35	q
6	3	Luca Antonio Cassano	Italy	10.36	q, =PB
7	1	Marvin René	France	10.39	Q
8	1	Samuli Samuelsson	Finland	10.39	Q
9	3	Dominik Záleský	Czech Republic	10.39	
10	2	Hillary Wanderson Polanco Rijo	Italy	10.42	
11	1	Joseph Dewar	Great Britain	10.45	
12	2	Petre Rezmives	Romania	10.47	
13	2	José Lopes	Portugal	10.51	=PB
14	3	Amaury Golitin	France	10.52	
15	1	Rafael Jorge	Portugal	10.53	
16	1	Emil von Barth	Sweden	10.54	
17	2	Daniel Hoffmann	Germany	10.56	
18	1	Dominik Kopeć	Poland	10.57	
19	2	Markus Fuchs	Austria	10.59	
20	2	Kojo Musah	Denmark	10.59	
21	3	Ricardo Pereira	Portugal	10.60	
22	3	Sylvain Chuard	Switzerland	10.62	
23	1	Manuel Eitel	Germany	10.65	
24	1	Ioan Andrei Melnicescu	Romania	10.68	

=== Final ===
14 July

Wind: 0.0 m/s

Rank	Lane	Name	Nationality	Time	Notes
1st place, gold medalist(s)	6	Ojie Edoburun	Great Britain	10.14	
2nd place, silver medalist(s)	4	Ján Volko	Slovakia	10.18	
3rd place, bronze medalist(s)	5	Jonathan Quarcoo	Norway	10.29	
4	7	Samuli Samuelsson	Finland	10.36	
5	2	Reuben Arthur	Great Britain	10.39	
6	9	Austin Hamilton	Sweden	10.40	
7	3	Luca Antonio Cassano	Italy	10.42	
8	8	Marvin René	France	10.44	
