= Reuben Arthur =

British male track and field sprinter

Personal information
- Nationality: British
- Born: 12 October 1996 (age 29) Islington, London
- Height: 1.68 m (5 ft 6 in)
- Weight: 67 kg (148 lb)

Sport
- Country: Great Britain, England
- Sport: Athletics
- Event: 100 metres

Achievements and titles
- Personal best: 100 m: 10.18
Medal record
Men's athletics
Representing England
Commonwealth Games
Gold medal – first place	2018 Gold Coast	4 × 100 m relay

Reuben Arthur (born 12 October 1996) is a British male track and field sprinter who specialises in the 100 metres. He was a relay gold medallist with England at the 2018 Commonwealth Games, leading off the team of Zharnel Hughes, Richard Kilty, and Harry Aikines-Aryeetey.

Born in Islington, London, he represented Great Britain in age category competitions, including the World Youth Championships in Athletics, World Junior Championships in Athletics, European Athletics Junior Championships and European Athletics U23 Championships. He won his first international medal at the 2017 European Athletics U23 Championships, taking a silver with the 4 × 100 metres relay team including Theo Etienne, Kyle de Escofet and Ojie Edoburun.

He joined Enfield and Haringey Athletic Club and worked with coaches Edwin Stevens and Jonas Dodoo. He went on to study at Goldsmiths, University of London and won the British Universities 100 m title in 2017.

== International competitions ==
Year	Competition	Venue	Position	Event	Notes
2013	World Youth Championships	Donetsk, Ukraine	4th (semis)	100 m	10.66
2014	World U20 Championships	Eugene, United States	5th (semis)	100 m	10.81
2014	World U20 Championships	Eugene, United States	— (h)	4 × 100 m relay	DNF
2015	European Junior Championships	Eskilstuna, Sweden	4th	100 m	10.67
2015	European Junior Championships	Eskilstuna, Sweden	— (h)	4 × 100 m relay	DQ
2017	European U23 Championships	Bydgoszcz, Poland	5th	100 m	10.39
2017	European U23 Championships	Bydgoszcz, Poland	2nd	4 × 100 m relay	39.11
2018	Commonwealth Games	Gold Coast, Australia	1st	4 × 100 m relay	38.13
