= Roman Kravtsov =

Ukrainian sprinter

Roman Kravtsov Gorilla
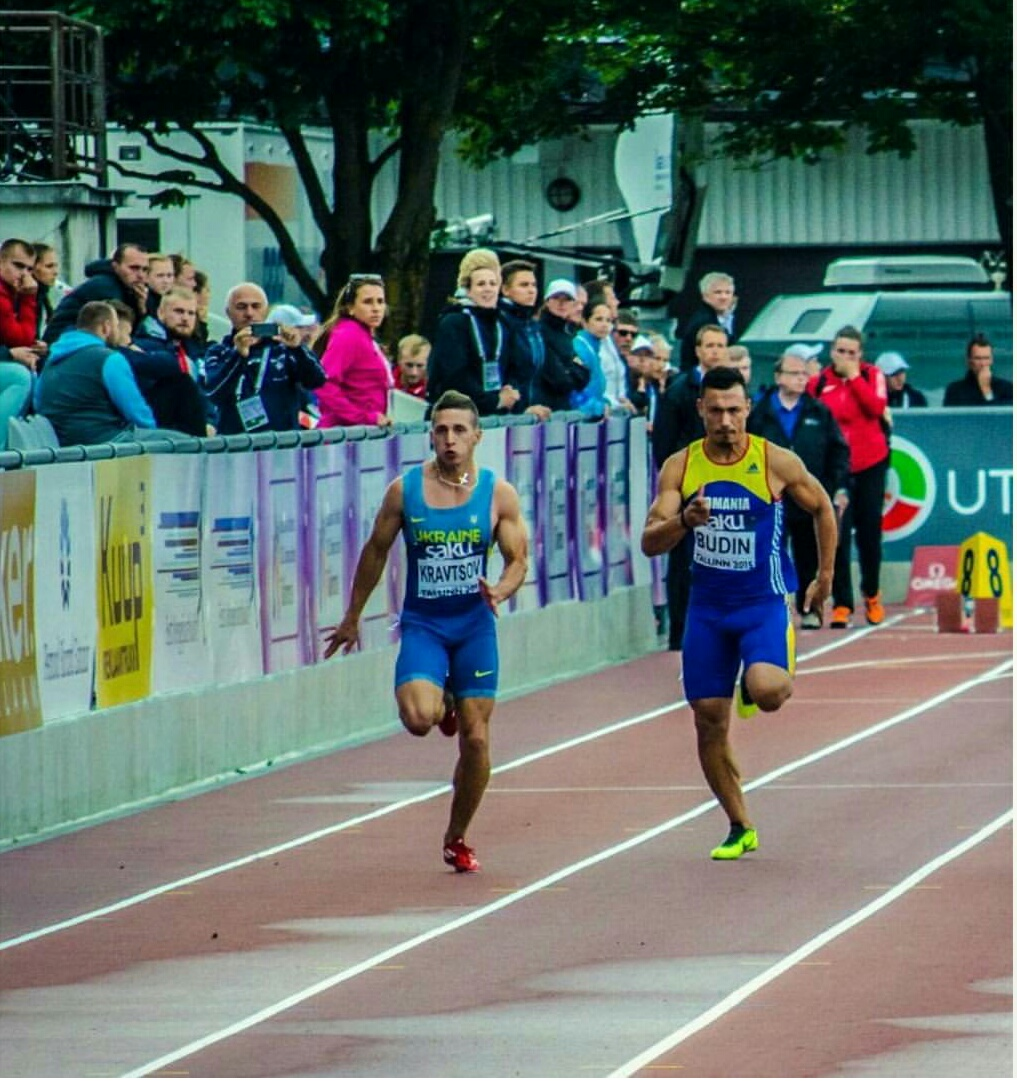

Personal information
- Full name: Kravtsov Roman Valerievich
- Nationality: Ukrainian
- Born: 18 May 1995 (age 31)

Sport
- Country: Ukraine
- Sport: Track and field
- Events: 100 metres 4 × 100 metres relay
Medal record
2020 Ukrainian Athletics Indoor Championships
| Bronze medal – third place | 2020 Sumy | 60 m |

Roman Kravtsov (Ukrainian: Роман Кравцов; born 18 May 1995) is a Ukrainian sprinter. He competed in the 4 × 100 metres relay event at the 2015 World Championships in Athletics in Beijing, China.

== International competitions ==
Representing Ukraine
| Year | Competition | Venue | Position | Event | Notes |
|---|---|---|---|---|---|
| 2014 | European Championships | Zürich, Switzerland | 9th (h) | 4 × 100 m relay | 39.03 |
| 2015 | European U23 Championships | Tallinn, Estonia | 10th (sf) | 100 m | 10.49 |
| 2015 | World Championships | Beijing, China | 11th (h) | 4 × 100 m relay | 38.79 |
| 2016 | European Championships | Amsterdam, Netherlands | 8th | 4 × 100 m relay | 39.46 |
| 2017 | European U23 Championships | Bydgoszcz, Poland | – | 4 × 100 m relay | DQ |

== Personal bests ==
| Event | Best | Location | Date |
|---|---|---|---|
| 60 metres | 6.78 s | Kyiv, Ukraine | 20 February 2015 |
| 100 metres | 10.39 s | Kirovohrad, London | 30 July 2015 |
| 200 metres | 21.19 s | Kyiv, Fa | 24 June 2016 |
