= Silvan Wicki =

Swiss sprinter (born 1995)

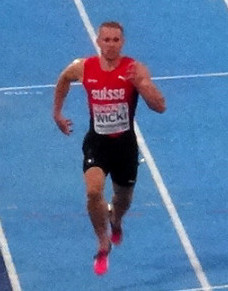
- Silvan Wicki in 2017

Personal information
- Born: 13 February 1995 (age 31)
- Education: Zurich University of Applied Sciences

Sport
- Sport: Athletics
- Events: 100 m, 200 m

Silvan Wicki (born 13 February 1995) is a Swiss sprinter. He represented his country at two European Championships without advancing from the heats.

== International competitions ==
Year	Competition	Venue	Position	Event	Notes
Representing Switzerland
2012	World Junior Championships	Barcelona, Spain	49th (h)	200 m	21.81
2012	World Junior Championships	Barcelona, Spain	–	4 × 100 m relay	DQ
2013	European Junior Championships	Rieti, Italy	18th (sf)	100 m	10.87
2013	European Junior Championships	Rieti, Italy	6th	4 × 100 m relay	40.26
2014	World Junior Championships	Eugene, United States	24th (sf)	100 m	11.14
2014	World Junior Championships	Eugene, United States	56th (h)	200 m	21.86
2015	European U23 Championships	Tallinn, Estonia	9th (h)	4 × 100 m relay	40.61
2016	European Championships	Amsterdam, Netherlands	20th (h)	200 m	21.41
2017	European U23 Championships	Bydgoszcz, Poland	7th	200 m	21.32
2017	Universiade	Taipei, Taiwan	16th (sf)	200 m	21.38
2017	Universiade	Taipei, Taiwan	7th (h)	4 × 100 m relay	39.77^{1}
2018	European Championships	Berlin, Germany	17th (h)	200 m	20.93
2018	European Championships	Berlin, Germany	10th (h)	4 × 100 m relay	39.13
2019	European Indoor Championships	Glasgow, United Kingdom	18th (sf)	60 m	6.76
2019	Universiade	Naples, Italy	12th (sf)	200 m	21.13
2021	Olympic Games	Tokyo, Japan	40th (h)	100 m	10.28

^{1}Did not finish in the final

== Personal bests ==
Outdoor

- 100 metres – 10.11 (+2.0 m/s, Bulle 2020)
- 200 metres – 20.60 (+1.4 m/s, Langenthal 2018)

Indoor

- 60 metres – 6.59 (Magglinen 2021)
- 200 metres – 21.74 (Magglingen 2014)
