= Austin Hamilton =

Swedish sprinter

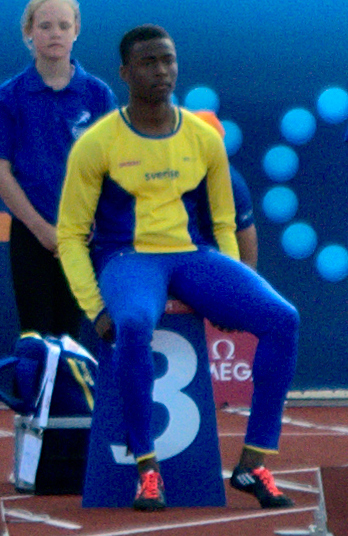
- Austin Hamilton in 2015

Medal record

Men's athletics

Representing Sweden

European Indoor Championships
Bronze medal – third place	2017 Belgrade	60 m

Austin Hamilton (born 29 July 1997) is a Swedish male track and field sprinter who competes mainly in the 100 metres. He was a bronze medallist in the 60 metres at the 2017 European Athletics Indoor Championships and represented his country at the 2016 European Athletics Championships in the 4 × 100 metres relay.

A member of Malmö AI club, Hamilton was born in Jamaica and moved to Sweden at the age of nine. He set a Swedish junior record of 10.40 seconds for the 100 metres.

== International competitions ==
Year	Competition	Venue	Position	Event	Notes
2014	World Junior Championships	Eugene, United States	15th (sf)	100 m	10.64
2015	European Junior Championships	Eskilstuna, Sweden	5th	100 m	10.72
2015	European Junior Championships	Eskilstuna, Sweden	1st	4 × 100 m relay	39.73 NJR
2016	World U20 Championships	Bydgoszcz, Poland	13th (sf)	100 m	10.47
2016	European Championships	Amsterdam, Netherlands	11th (h)	4 × 100 m relay	39.37
2017	European Indoor Championships	Belgrade, Serbia	3rd	60 m	6.63
2017	European U23 Championships	Bydgoszcz, Poland	6th	100 m	10.40
2017	European U23 Championships	Bydgoszcz, Poland	–	4 × 100 m relay	DNF
2019	European Indoor Championships	Glasgow, United Kingdom	17th (sf)	60 m	6.75
2019	European U23 Championships	Gävle, Sweden	8th	100 m	14.70 (w)

== Personal bests ==
- 60 metres – 6.63 (2017)
- 100 metres – 10.39 (2019)
- 200 metres – 21.37 (2015)

All info from All-Athletics profile.
