= Michael O'Hara (athlete) =

Jamaican sprinter

Personal information
- Full name: Michael Sydney Anthony O'Hara Jr.
- Born: 29 September 1996 (age 29) Kingston, Jamaica

Sport
- Country: Jamaica
- Sport: Athletics
- Event(s): 110 metres hurdles and 200 metres
Medal record
Men's athletics
Representing Jamaica
World Junior Championships
Bronze medal – third place	Eugene 2014	200 m
Bronze medal – third place	Eugene 2014	4×100 m relay
World Youth Championships
Gold medal – first place	Donetsk 2013	200 m
Gold medal – first place	Donetsk 2013	Medley relay
CARIFTA Games (Junior)
Gold medal – first place	2014 Fort-de-France	200 m
Gold medal – first place	2014 Fort-de-France	4×100 m relay
Silver medal – second place	2015 Basseterre	100 m
Gold medal – first place	2015 Basseterre	4×100 m relay
Gold medal – first place	2015 Basseterre	4×400 m relay
CARIFTA Games (Youth)
Silver medal – second place	2012 Hamilton	100 m
Silver medal – second place	2012 Hamilton	110 m hurdles
Gold medal – first place	2012 Hamilton	4×100 m relay
Gold medal – first place	2012 Hamilton	4×400 m relay
- Updated on 28 August 2022

Michael O'Hara (born 29 September 1996 in Kingston) is a Jamaican sprinter who specializes in the 110 metres hurdles.

== Career ==
He won a gold medal in the 200 m at the 2013 World Youth Championships.

His personal best time is 10.19 seconds, achieved in May 2014 in Kingston. He also has 20.45 seconds in the 200 metres, achieved in July 2014 in Eugene.

== Personal best ==
Event	Result	Venue	Date
100 m	10.19 s (wind: +1.8 m/s)	(Jamaica) Kingston	24 May 2014
200 m	20.45 s (wind: +1.3 m/s)	(United States) Eugene	24 July 2014
110 m hurdles	13.40 s (wind: +1.4 m/s)	(Jamaica) Kingston	25 June 2022

== Achievements ==
Year	Competition	Venue	Position	Event	Notes
Representing Jamaica
2012	CARIFTA Games (U17)	Hamilton, Bermuda, Bermuda	2nd	100 m	10.68 w (wind: +3.6 m/s)
2012	CARIFTA Games (U17)	Hamilton, Bermuda, Bermuda	2nd	110 m hurdles (91 cm)	13.97 (wind: +0.8 m/s)
2012	CARIFTA Games (U17)	Hamilton, Bermuda, Bermuda	1st	4 × 100 m relay	41.64
2012	CARIFTA Games (U17)	Hamilton, Bermuda, Bermuda	1st	4 × 400 m relay	3:14.52
2012	2012 CAC Junior Championships (U18)	San Salvador, El Salvador	10th (h)	200 m	21.82 (wind: +0.4 m/s)
2012	2012 CAC Junior Championships (U18)	San Salvador, El Salvador	3rd	110 m hurdles	13.65 (wind: -0.5 m/s)
2012	2012 CAC Junior Championships (U18)	San Salvador, El Salvador	1st	4 × 100 m relay	40.17
2013	IAAF World Youth Championships	Donetsk, Ukraine	4th	100 m	10.46 (wind: -0.4 m/s)
2013	IAAF World Youth Championships	Donetsk, Ukraine	1st	200 m	20.63 (wind: -1.0 m/s)
2013	IAAF World Youth Championships	Donetsk, Ukraine	1st	Medley relay	1:49.23
2014	CARIFTA Games (U20)	Fort-de-France, Martinique	1st	200 m	20.50 (wind: +1.3 m/s)
2014	CARIFTA Games (U20)	Fort-de-France, Martinique	1st	4 × 100 m relay	39.38
2014	World Junior Championships	Eugene, United States	17th (sf)	100 m	10.69 (wind: 0.0 m/s)
2014	World Junior Championships	Eugene, United States	3rd	200m	20.31 w (wind: +2.3 m/s)
2014	World Junior Championships	Eugene, United States	3rd	4 × 100 m relay	39.12
2015	CARIFTA Games (U20)	Basseterre, Saint Kitts and Nevis	2nd	100 m	10.33 (wind: +1.5 m/s)
2015	CARIFTA Games (U20)	Basseterre, Saint Kitts and Nevis	1st	4 × 100 m relay	40.39
2015	CARIFTA Games (U20)	Basseterre, Saint Kitts and Nevis	1st	4 × 400 m relay	3:09.13
