= Jonathan Quarcoo =

Norwegian sprinter (born 1996)

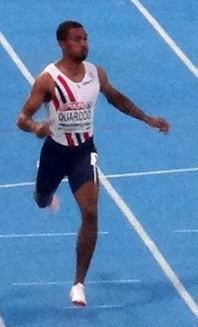
- Jonathan Quarcoo in 2017

Personal information
- Born: 13 October 1996 (age 29) Bodø, Norway

Sport
- Sport: Athletics
- Event(s): 100 m, 200 m
- Club: FIK Orion

Jonathan Tetteh Quarcoo (born 13 October 1996) is a Norwegian sprinter.

He won the European Team Championships 2017, 1st League, in 100 m. He also represented his country at the 2017 World Championships narrowly missing the semifinals in 200m, and won a bronze medal at the 2017 European U23 Championships.

== International competitions ==
Year	Competition	Venue	Position	Event	Notes
Representing Norway
2014	World Junior Championships	Eugene, United States	36th (h)	200 m	21.50
2014	World Junior Championships	Eugene, United States	11th (h)	4 x 100 m relay	40.62
2015	European Junior Championships	Eskilstuna, Sweden	4th	200 m	20.99
2015	European Junior Championships	Eskilstuna, Sweden	3rd (h)	4 x 100 m relay	40.46^{1}
2016	European Championships	Amsterdam, Netherlands	10th (h)	4 × 100 m relay	39.35
2017	European U23 Championships	Bydgoszcz, Poland	3rd	100 m	10.29
2017	European U23 Championships	Bydgoszcz, Poland	4th	200 m	20.80
2017	World Championships	London, United Kingdom	26th (h)	200 m	20.60
2018	European Championships	Berlin, Germany	22nd (sf)	100 m	10.45
2018	European Championships	Berlin, Germany	22nd (sf)	200 m	21.07

^{1}Disqualified in the final

== Personal bests ==
Outdoor

- 100 metres – 10.26 (+0.8 m/s, Bydgoszcz 2017)
- 200 metres – 20.39 (+0.9 m/s, Bydgoszcz 2017)

Indoor

- 60 metres – 6.76 (Rud 2016)
- 200 metres – 21.79 (Bærum 2014)
