= 2013 World Youth Championships in Athletics – Boys' 100 metres =

Boys' 100 metres at the 2013 World Youth Championships in Athletics
- Venue: RSC Olimpiyskiy
- Dates: 10 July (heats); 11 July (semifinal & final)
- Competitors: 94
- Winning time: 10.35 WYL

Medalists
gold medal	Mo Youxue	China
silver medal	Ojie Edoburun	Great Britain
bronze medal	Reynier Mena	Cuba

The boys' 100 metres at the 2013 World Youth Championships in Athletics was held on 10 and 11 July.

== Medalists ==
Gold	Silver	Bronze
Mo Youxue; China	Ojie Edoburun; Great Britain	Reynier Mena; Cuba

== Records ==
Prior to the competition, the following records were as follows.

World Youth Best	Yoshihide Kiryū (JPN)	10.19	Fukuroi, Japan	3 November 2012
Championship Record	Darrel Brown (TRI)	10.31	Debrecen, Hungary	13 July 2001
World Youth Leading	Kristoffer Hari (DEN)	10.37	Schweinfurt, Germany	22 June 2013

== Heats ==
Qualification rule: first 2 of each heat (Q) qualified.

=== Heat 1 ===
Rank	Lane	Name	Nationality	Time	Notes
1	3	Ejowvokoghene Oduduru	Nigeria	10.67	Q
2	7	Reuben Arthur	Great Britain	10.71	Q
3	6	Mahmoud Hammoudi	Algeria	10.92	
4	2	Amund Høie Sjursen	Norway	11.00	
5	8	Mzamo Mngomezulu	Swaziland	11.27	
6	5	Alexis Aguilar	Argentina	11.39	
7	1	Sylla Sekou	Guinea	11.56	PB
8	4	Christopher Matute	Honduras	11.96	PB

=== Heat 2 ===
Rank	Lane	Name	Nationality	Time	Notes
1	4	Reynier Mena	Cuba	10.85	Q
2	6	Lê Trong Hinh	Vietnam	11.11	Q
3	3	Sadiki Tyson	Saint Kitts and Nevis	11.16	
4	2	Yang Chun-Han	Chinese Taipei	11.17	
5	7	Vladyslav Chepurnyy	Ukraine	11.43	
6	8	Blagota Petricevic	Montenegro	11.55	
7	5	Janille Greenidge	Saint Lucia	11.84	
8	1	Telava Mafoa	Tuvalu	12.60	PB

=== Heat 3 ===
Rank	Lane	Name	Nationality	Time	Notes
1	4	Mo Youxue	China	10.64	Q
2	3	Lee Jeong-Tae	South Korea	10.97	Q
3	8	Ian Kerr	Bahamas	11.04	
4	5	Csaba Kiss	Hungary	11.10	
5	2	Jacob Waqanivalu	Fiji	11.17	
6	6	Arturo Sepúlveda	Mexico	11.20	
7	7	Eduard Plotnikov	Israel	11.39	

=== Heat 4 ===
Rank	Lane	Name	Nationality	Time	Notes
1	6	Kenzo Cotton	United States	10.52	Q, PB
2	4	Marek Šefránek	Slovakia	10.91	Q
3	7	Keanu Pennerman	Bahamas	11.21	
4	3	Nisal S.D.K. Mudiyanselage	Sri Lanka	11.32	
5	8	Sudirman Hadi	Indonesia	11.42	
6	5	Oleksandr Revenko	Ukraine	11.43	
7	2	Cajuniba Okirua	Cook Islands	12.20	PB
8	1	Brenden Yamase	Federated States of Micronesia	12.22	PB

=== Heat 5 ===
Rank	Lane	Name	Nationality	Time	Notes
1	2	Vítor Hugo dos Santos	Brazil	10.74	Q
2	3	Reberto Boyde	Saint Vincent and the Grenadines	10.86	Q
3	4	Even Meinseth	Norway	11.08	
4	8	Aaron Powell	Fiji	11.09	
5	1	Edwin Diodonet	Puerto Rico	11.18	
6	6	Kyel West	Cayman Islands	11.41	PB
7	5	Sean Penalver	Gibraltar	12.54	PB
	7	Meshaal Almutairi	Kuwait	DQ	

=== Heat 6 ===
Rank	Lane	Name	Nationality	Time	Notes
1	6	Ojie Edoburun	Great Britain	10.68	Q
2	5	Karabo Mothibi	Botswana	10.99	Q
3	4	Nejc Mozina	Slovenia	11.09	
4	3	Namataiki Tevenino	French Polynesia	11.58	
5	2	Brent Joseph	Saint Lucia	11.60	
6	8	Ali Anaal	Maldives	11.72	PB
7	7	Arosha I.K.U. Gamage	Sri Lanka	14.25	
	1	Fabian Netzlaff	Germany	DNS	

=== Heat 7 ===
Rank	Lane	Name	Nationality	Time	Notes
1	7	Aitor Same Ekobo	Spain	10.86	Q
2	5	Ricardo Pereira	Portugal	10.97	Q
3	3	Lucanus Robinson	Canada	11.08	
4	1	Josneyber Ramírez	Venezuela	11.09	
5	8	Daniel Avendaño	Colombia	11.23	
6	2	Sebastien Clarice	Mauritius	11.49	
7	4	Siosaia Teumohenga	Tonga	12.67	
	6	Nanthavat Khentanone	Laos	DNS	

=== Heat 8 ===
Rank	Lane	Name	Nationality	Time	Notes
1	8	Mario Burke	Barbados	10.66	Q
2	7	Ibrahim Moussa Adam	Qatar	10.85	Q, PB
3	3	Reuberth Boyde	Saint Vincent and the Grenadines	10.88	
4	2	Alkronus Bridgewater	Saint Kitts and Nevis	11.14	
5	1	Peter Trajkovski	Denmark	11.18	
6	4	Guvanch Mattaganov	Turkmenistan	11.48	PB
	6	Lee-Anzo Losper	Namibia	DQ	
	5	Sergey Vasilyev	Kazakhstan	DNS	

=== Heat 9 ===
Rank	Lane	Name	Nationality	Time	Notes
1	3	Michael O'Hara	Jamaica	10.66	Q
2	2	Michael Songore	Zimbabwe	10.72	Q, PB
3	8	Jin Ri	China	10.99	
4	7	Leonel Carrizo	Argentina	11.21	
5	4	Wong Wai Kin	Hong Kong	11.27	
6	5	Antony Mikael	Lebanon	11.39	
	6	Lee Chang-Soo	South Korea	DNF	

=== Heat 10 ===
Rank	Lane	Name	Nationality	Time	Notes
1	5	Shunto Nagata	Japan	10.81	Q
2	6	Daniel Martínez	Mexico	11.08	Q
3	8	Abdesselam Bouchamia	Algeria	11.08	
4	7	Jakub Galandziej	Poland	11.16	
5	4	Saif Khalfan Al Obaidani	Oman	11.26	
6	1	Aaron Hector	Canada	11.29	
7	2	Jean-Eve Roseline	Seychelles	11.37	
8	3	Jervian Boatswain	Montserrat	12.20	PB

=== Heat 11 ===
Rank	Lane	Name	Nationality	Time	Notes
1	4	Jaalen Jones	United States	10.68	Q
2	1	Andrea Federici	Italy	10.88	Q
3	8	Akiyoshi Ono	Japan	10.89	
4	2	Frederik Schou-Nielsen	Denmark	10.93	
5	5	Mohamed Saad Ghali	Bahrain	11.10	
6	6	Jean Daniel Lozereau	Mauritius	11.11	
7	3	George Molisingi	Vanuatu	11.45	PB
8	7	Utiraoi Takaria	Kiribati	11.91	PB

=== Heat 12 ===
Rank	Lane	Name	Nationality	Time	Notes
1	2	Waseem Williams	Jamaica	10.66	Q
2	1	Cornelius Janse van Rensburg	South Africa	10.96	Q
3	4	Francesco Tarussio	Italy	11.08	
4	8	Pavel Vereshchagin	Russia	11.12	
5	3	Christophe Boulos	Lebanon	11.34	
6	6	Miktat Kaya	Turkey	11.34	
7	7	Hasib Muratovic	Bosnia and Herzegovina	11.61	
8	5	Mohammed Abusenan	Palestine	12.29	

== Semifinals ==
Qualification rule: first 2 of each heat (Q) plus the 2 fastest times (q) qualified.

=== Heat 1 ===
Rank	Lane	Name	Nationality	Time	Notes
1	5	Reynier Mena	Cuba	10.43	Q
2	3	Mo Youxue	China	10.44	Q
3	4	Michael O'Hara	Jamaica	10.47	q
4	7	Reuben Arthur	Great Britain	10.66	
5	6	Jaalen Jones	United States	10.67	
6	1	Lee Jeong-Tae	South Korea	10.79	
7	8	Andrea Federici	Italy	11.04	
8	2	Daniel Martínez	Mexico	11.05	

=== Heat 2 ===
Rank	Lane	Name	Nationality	Time	Notes
1	4	Ojie Edoburun	Great Britain	10.55	Q
2	6	Aitor Same Ekobo	Spain	10.76	Q
3	7	Michael Songore	Zimbabwe	10.84	
4	1	Lê Trong Hinh	Vietnam	10.88	
5	8	Marek Šefránek	Slovakia	10.96	
6	5	Ejowvokoghene Oduduru	Nigeria	11.05	
7	2	Cornelius Janse van Rensburg	South Africa	11.06	
8	3	Kenzo Cotton	United States	12.35	

=== Heat 3 ===
Rank	Lane	Name	Nationality	Time	Notes
1	6	Mario Burke	Barbados	10.49	Q, PB
2	3	Vítor Hugo dos Santos	Brazil	10.51	Q, PB
3	4	Waseem Williams	Jamaica	10.59	q
4	1	Ricardo Pereira	Portugal	10.79	PB
5	7	Roberto Boyde	Saint Vincent and the Grenadines	10.82	
6	8	Ibrahim Moussa Adam	Qatar	10.85	
7	5	Shunto Nagata	Japan	10.87	
8	2	Karabo Mothibi	Botswana	11.00	

== Final ==
Rank	Lane	Name	Nationality	Time	Notes
1st place, gold medalist(s)	6	Mo Youxue	China	10.35	WYL
2nd place, silver medalist(s)	4	Ojie Edoburun	Great Britain	10.35	PB
3rd place, bronze medalist(s)	5	Reynier Mena	Cuba	10.37	PB
4	1	Michael O'Hara	Jamaica	10.46	
5	3	Mario Burke	Barbados	10.51	
6	8	Vítor Hugo dos Santos	Brazil	10.53	
7	2	Waseem Williams	Jamaica	10.58	
8	7	Aitor Same Ekobo	Spain	10.65	PB
