= Samuli Samuelsson =

Finnish sprinter

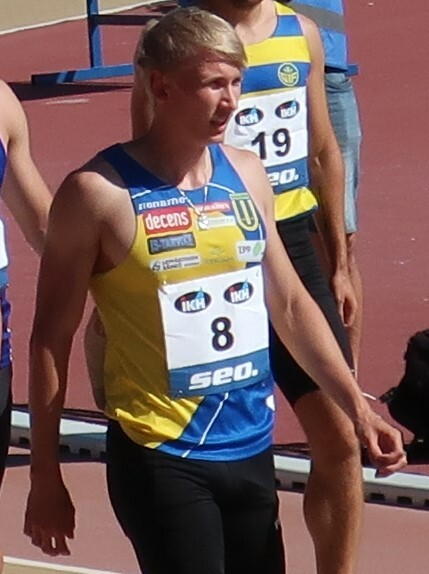
- Samuelsson in 2020

Personal information
- Full name: Samuli Kalevi Samuelsson
- Born: 23 June 1995 (age 31) Ikaalinen, Finland
- Height: 1.80 m (5 ft 11 in)
- Weight: 71 kg (157 lb)

Sport
- Sport: Athletics
- Event(s): 100 m, 200 m
- Club: Team Ikaalisten Urheilijat
- Coached by: Mikael Ylöstalo

Samuli Kalevi Samuelsson (born 23 June 1995) is a Finnish athlete competing in sprinting events. He won a bronze medal at the 2017 European U23 Championships in Bydgoszcz. He is the national record holder in 100 meters.

== International competitions ==
Year	Competition	Venue	Position	Event	Notes
Representing Finland
2013	European Junior Championships	Rieti, Italy	8th (h)	4 × 100 m relay	40.33
2014	World Junior Championships	Eugene, United States	37th (h)	100 m	10.78
2014	World Junior Championships	Eugene, United States	37th (h)	200 m	21.53
2015	European U23 Championships	Tallinn, Estonia	6th	200 m	20.90
2015	European U23 Championships	Tallinn, Estonia	–	4 × 100 m relay	DNF
2016	European Championships	Amsterdam, Netherlands	19th (h)	200 m	21.36
2016	European Championships	Amsterdam, Netherlands	15th (h)	4 × 100 m relay	39.68
2017	European U23 Championships	Bydgoszcz, Poland	4th	100 m	10.36
2017	European U23 Championships	Bydgoszcz, Poland	5th (h)	200 m	20.93^{1}
2017	European U23 Championships	Bydgoszcz, Poland	3rd	4 × 100 m relay	39.70
2017	Universiade	Taipei, Taiwan	8th (sf)	200 m	20.99
2017	Universiade	Taipei, Taiwan	7th	4 × 100 m relay	40.37
2021	European Indoor Championships	Toruń, Poland	30th (h)	60 m	6.75
2022	European Championships	Munich, Germany	12th (h)	100 m	10.39
2022	European Championships	Munich, Germany	12th (h)	4 × 100 m relay	39.37
2023	European Indoor Championships	Istanbul, Turkey	29th (h)	60 m	6.75
2024	World Indoor Championships	Glasgow, United Kingdom	28th (h)	60 m	6.72
2024	European Championships	Rome, Italy	23rd (sf)	100 m	10.59

^{1}Disqualified in the semifinals

== Personal bests ==
Outdoor

- 100 metres – 10.12 (Kuortane 2023)
- 200 metres – 20.73 (Seinäjoki 2017)

Indoor

- 60 metres – 6.64 (Aarhus 2022)
- 200 metres – 21.25 (Helsinki 2022)
