= 2016 European Athletics Championships – Men's 4 × 100 metres relay =

Men's 4 × 100 metres relay at the European Athletics Championships
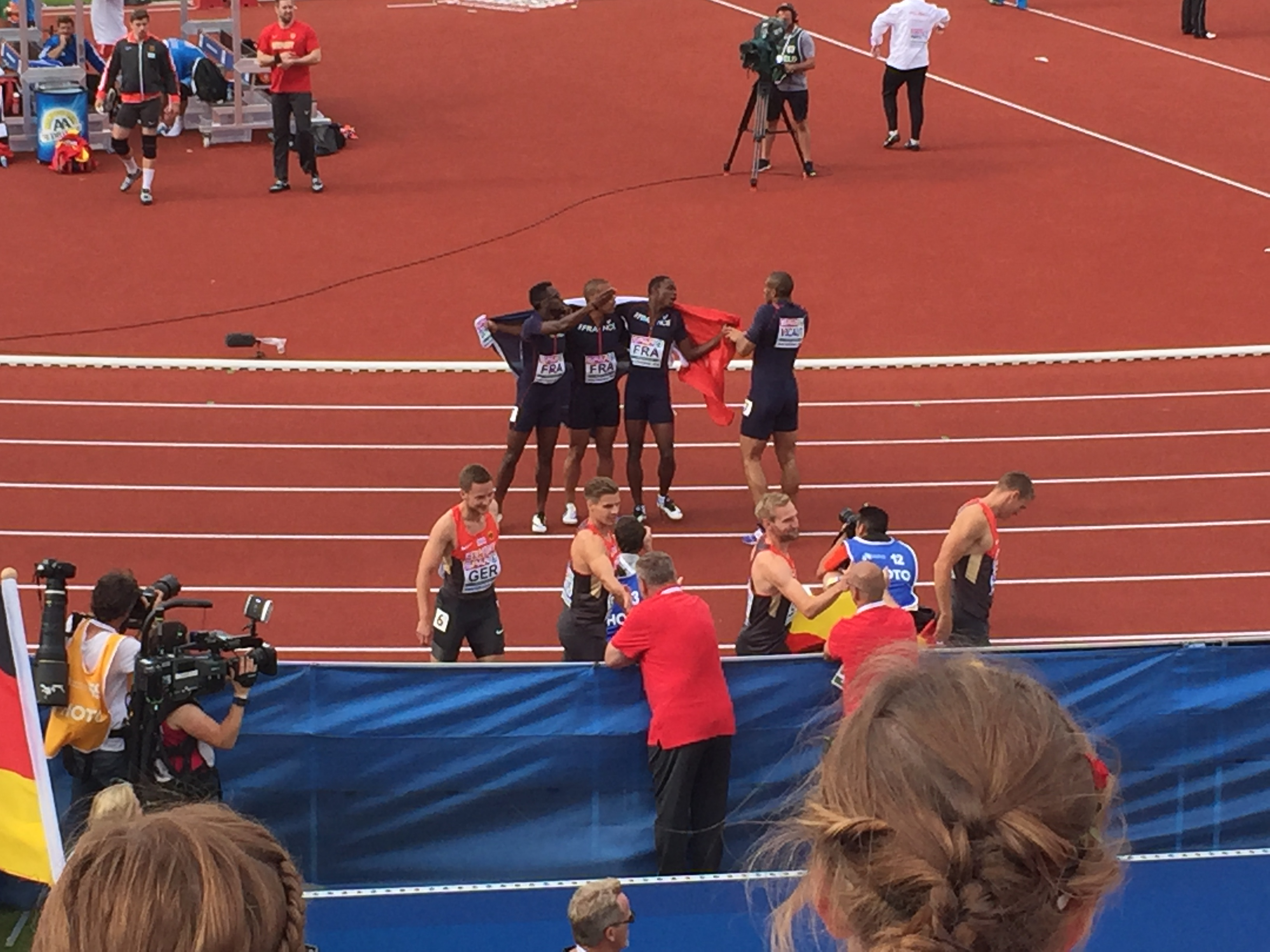
- Venue: Olympic Stadium
- Location: Amsterdam
- Dates: 9 July (round 1); 10 July (final)
- Competitors: 66 from 16 nations
- Winning time: 38.17

Medalists
| gold medal | James Dasaolu; Adam Gemili; James Ellington; Chijindu Ujah | Great Britain |
| silver medal | Marvin René; Stuart Dutamby; Mickael-Meba Zeze; Jimmy Vicaut | France |
| bronze medal | Julian Reus; Sven Knipphals; Roy Schmidt; Lucas Jakubczyk; Robert Hering* | Germany |

The men's 4 × 100 metres relay at the 2016 European Athletics Championships took place at the Olympic Stadium on 9 and 10 July.

== Records ==
Standing records prior to the 2016 European Athletics Championships
| World record | Jamaica; Nesta Carter, Michael Frater; Yohan Blake, Usain Bolt | 36.84 | London, Great Britain | 11 August 2012 |
| European record | Great Britain; Jason Gardener, Darren Campbell; Marlon Devonish, Dwain Chambers | 37.73 | Seville, Spain | 29 August 1999 |
| Championship record | France; Max Moriniere, Daniel Sangouma; Jean-Charles Trouabal, Bruno Marie-Rose | 37.79 | Split, Yugoslavia | 1 September 1990 |
| World Leading | Canada; Gavin Smellie, Ben Williams; Dontae Richards-Kwok, Justyn Warner | 38.11 | Gainesville, United States | 2 April 2016 |
| European Leading | Turkey; Emre Zafer Barnes, Jak Ali Harvey; İzzet Safer, Ramil Guliyev | 38.31A | Erzurum, Turkey | 12 June 2016 |

== Schedule ==
| Date | Time | Round |
|---|---|---|
| 9 July 2016 | 19:40 | Round 1 |
| 10 July 2016 | 17:55 | Final |

All times are local times (UTC+2)

== Results ==
=== Round 1 ===
First 3 in each heat (Q) and 2 best performers (q) advance to the Final.

| Rank | Heat | Nation | Athletes | Time | Notes |
|---|---|---|---|---|---|
| 1 | 1 | Great Britain | James Dasaolu, Adam Gemili, James Ellington, Chijindu Ujah | 38.12 | Q, EL |
| 2 | 1 | Germany | Julian Reus, Sven Knipphals, Robert Hering, Lucas Jakubczyk | 38.25 | Q, SB |
| 3 | 1 | Italy | Massimiliano Ferraro, Federico Cattaneo, Davide Manenti, Filippo Tortu | 38.58 | Q, SB |
| 4 | 2 | Poland | Grzegorz Zimniewicz, Przemysław Słowikowski, Adam Pawłowski, Karol Zalewski | 38.64 | Q, SB |
| 5 | 2 | Netherlands | Giovanni Codrington, Churandy Martina, Patrick van Luijk, Dimitri Juliet | 38.78 | Q |
| 6 | 2 | France | Marvin René, Stuart Dutamby, Mickael-Meba Zeze, Jimmy Vicaut | 38.85 | Q, SB |
| 7 | 1 | Switzerland | Pascal Mancini, Reto Amaru Schenkel, Suganthan Somasunduram, Alex Wilson | 38.88 | q, SB |
| 8 | 1 | Ukraine | Roman Kravtsov, Volodymyr Suprun, Ihor Bodrov, Vitaliy Korzh | 39.12 | q |
| 9 | 1 | Spain | Mauro Triana, Óscar Husillos, Alberto Gavaldá, Ángel David Rodríguez | 39.15 | SB |
| 10 | 2 | Norway | Jonas Tapani Halonen, Jonathan Quarcoo, Håkon Morken, Jaysuma Saidy Ndure | 39.35 | SB |
| 11 | 1 | Sweden | Emil von Barth, Austin Hamilton, Tom Kling-Baptiste, Johan Wissman | 39.37 | SB |
| 12 | 2 | Portugal | Ancuiam Lopes, Francis Obikwelu, David Lima, Carlos Nascimento | 39.51 | |
| 13 | 1 | Ireland | Jason Smyth, Eanna Madden, Jonathon Browning, Marcus Lawler | 39.52 | SB |
| 14 | 2 | Turkey | Umutcan Emektaş, Jak Ali Harvey, İzzet Safer, Ramil Guliyev | 39.58 | |
| 15 | 2 | Finland | Eetu Rantala, Otto Ahlfors, Samuli Samuelsson, Ville Myllymäki | 39.68 | |
| 16 | 2 | Romania | Daniel Budin, Ioan Andrei Melnicescu, Ionut Andrei Neagoe, Cătălin Cîmpeanu | 39.98 | |

=== Final ===
| Rank | Lane | Nation | Athletes | Time | Notes |
|---|---|---|---|---|---|
| 1st place, gold medalist(s) | 5 | Great Britain | James Dasaolu, Adam Gemili, James Ellington, Chijindu Ujah | 38.17 | |
| 2nd place, silver medalist(s) | 7 | France | Marvin René, Stuart Dutamby, Mickael-Meba Zeze, Jimmy Vicaut | 38.38 | SB |
| 3rd place, bronze medalist(s) | 6 | Germany | Julian Reus, Sven Knipphals, Roy Schmidt, Lucas Jakubczyk | 38.47 | |
| 4 | 4 | Netherlands | Solomon Bockarie, Churandy Martina, Patrick van Luijk, Giovanni Codrington | 38.57 | |
| 5 | 8 | Italy | Massimiliano Ferraro, Federico Cattaneo, Davide Manenti, Filippo Tortu | 38.69 | |
| 6 | 3 | Poland | Grzegorz Zimniewicz, Przemysław Słowikowski, Adam Pawłowski, Karol Zalewski | 38.69 | |
| 7 | 1 | Switzerland | Pascal Mancini, Reto Amaru Schenkel, Suganthan Somasunduram, Alex Wilson | 39.11 | |
| 8 | 2 | Ukraine | Roman Kravtsov, Volodymyr Suprun, Ihor Bodrov, Vitaliy Korzh | 39.46 | |
