= 2017 European Athletics U23 Championships – Men's 200 metres =

The men's 200 metres event at the 2017 European Athletics U23 Championships was held in Bydgoszcz, Poland, at Zdzisław Krzyszkowiak Stadium on 14 and 15 July.

== Medalists ==
| Gold | Ján Volko; Slovakia |
| Silver | Gautier Dautremer; France |
| Bronze | Roger Gurski; Germany |

== Records ==
Prior to the competition, the records were as follows:

| European U23 record | Christophe Lemaitre (FRA) | 19.80 | Daegu, South Korea | 3 September 2011 |
| Championship U23 record | Chris Lambert (GBR) | 20.34 | Bydgoszcz, Poland | 20 July 2003 |

== Results ==
=== Heats ===
14 July

Qualification rule: First 3 (Q) and the next 4 fastest (q) qualified for the semifinals.

Wind:
Heat 1: +0.9 m/s, Heat 2: +1.2 m/s, Heat 3: +0.5 m/s, Heat 4: +1.0 m/s

| Rank | Heat | Name | Nationality | Time | Notes |
|---|---|---|---|---|---|
| 1 | 1 | Gautier Dautremer | France | 20.74 | Q, PB |
| 2 | 3 | Jonathan Quarcoo | Norway | 20.79 | Q, PB |
| 3 | 2 | Ján Volko | Slovakia | 20.80 | Q |
| 4 | 1 | Roger Gurski | Germany | 20.88 | Q |
| 5 | 2 | Samuli Samuelsson | Finland | 20.93 | Q |
| 6 | 3 | Silvan Wicki | Switzerland | 20.95 | Q, SB |
| 7 | 4 | Kevin Ugo | Germany | 21.06 | Q |
| 8 | 1 | Oskari Lehtonen | Finland | 21.06 | Q, PB |
| 9 | 3 | Simone Tanzilli | Italy | 21.09 | Q |
| 10 | 4 | Felix Svensson | Sweden | 21.09 | Q |
| 11 | 2 | Jacopo Spanò | Italy | 21.14 | Q |
| 12 | 4 | Lodovico Cortelazzo | Italy | 21.20 | Q |
| 13 | 2 | Ricardo Ribeiro | Portugal | 21.21 | q |
| 14 | 1 | Rafael Jorge | Portugal | 21.22 | q |
| 15 | 2 | Petre Rezmives | Romania | 21.23 | q |
| 16 | 4 | Daniel Cerdán | Spain | 21.24 | q |
| 17 | 3 | Fatih Aktaş | Turkey | 21.26 | |
| 18 | 3 | Jiří Kubeš | Czech Republic | 21.31 | |
| 19 | 1 | Kolbeinn Hödur Gunnarsson | Iceland | 21.39 | |
| 20 | 4 | Aleksa Kijanović | Serbia | 21.44 | |
| 21 | 1 | Dániel Szabó | Hungary | 21.46 | |
| 22 | 3 | Daniel Rodríguez | Spain | 21.52 | |
| 23 | 1 | Damir Redžepagić | Bosnia and Herzegovina | 21.52 | |
| 24 | 4 | Raitis Fomrats | Latvia | 22.14 | |
| 25 | 2 | Luke Bezzina | Malta | 22.19 | |
| | 3 | Alji Shabani | Macedonia | DQ | R162.7 |
| | 4 | Markus Fuchs | Austria | DQ | R162.7 |

=== Semifinals ===
15 July

Qualification rule: First 3 (Q) and the next 2 fastest (q) qualified for the final.

Wind:
Heat 1: +0.9 m/s, Heat 2: +0.9 m/s

| Rank | Heat | Name | Nationality | Time | Notes |
|---|---|---|---|---|---|
| 1 | 1 | Jonathan Quarcoo | Norway | 20.39 | Q, NU23R |
| 2 | 1 | Ján Volko | Slovakia | 20.54 | Q, NR |
| 3 | 1 | Roger Gurski | Germany | 20.71 | Q |
| 4 | 2 | Gautier Dautremer | France | 20.78 | Q |
| 5 | 2 | Felix Svensson | Sweden | 20.87 | Q, PB |
| 6 | 2 | Silvan Wicki | Switzerland | 20.89 | Q, PB |
| 7 | 1 | Simone Tanzilli | Italy | 20.93 | q |
| 8 | 2 | Lodovico Cortelazzo | Italy | 20.95 | q |
| 9 | 1 | Jacopo Spanò | Italy | 21.02 | SB |
| 10 | 2 | Oskari Lehtonen | Finland | 21.17 | |
| 11 | 2 | Ricardo Ribeiro | Portugal | 21.22 | |
| 12 | 1 | Rafael Jorge | Portugal | 21.25 | |
| 13 | 2 | Daniel Cerdán | Spain | 21.30 | |
| 14 | 2 | Kevin Ugo | Germany | 1:03.87 | |
| | 1 | Petre Rezmives | Romania | DNF | |
| | 1 | Samuli Samuelsson | Finland | DQ | R162.7 |

=== Final ===
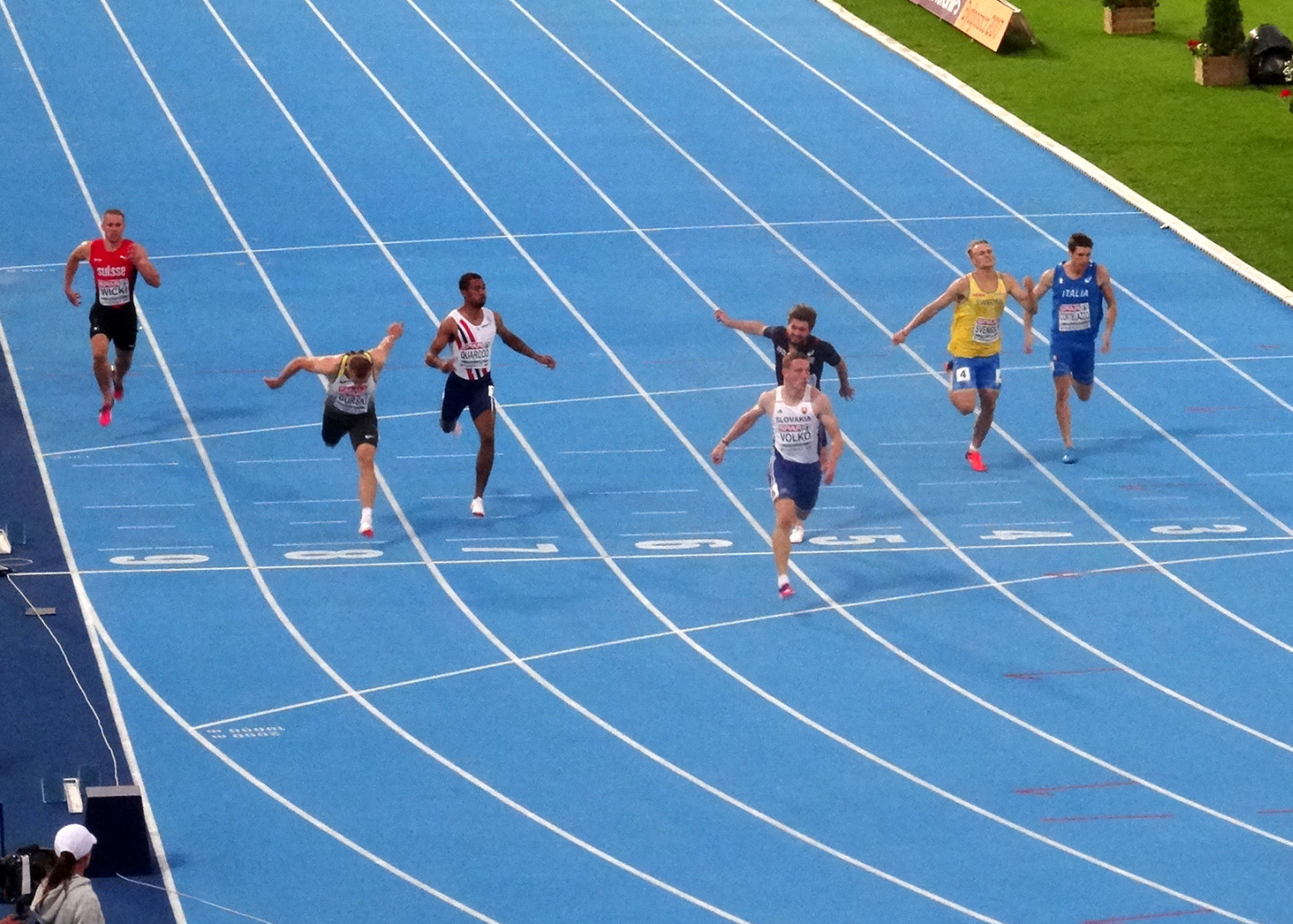
The final

15 July

Wind: +1.6 m/s

| Rank | Lane | Name | Nationality | Time | Notes |
|---|---|---|---|---|---|
| 1st place, gold medalist(s) | 6 | Ján Volko | Slovakia | 20.33 | CR, NR |
| 2nd place, silver medalist(s) | 5 | Gautier Dautremer | France | 20.66 | PB |
| 3rd place, bronze medalist(s) | 8 | Roger Gurski | Germany | 20.70 | |
| 4 | 7 | Jonathan Quarcoo | Norway | 20.80 | |
| 5 | 4 | Felix Svensson | Sweden | 20.95 | |
| 6 | 3 | Lodovico Cortelazzo | Italy | 21.05 | |
| 7 | 9 | Silvan Wicki | Switzerland | 21.32 | |
| | 2 | Simone Tanzilli | Italy | DNS | |
