= Takuya Kawakami =

Japanese sprinter (born 1995)

Personal information
- Nationality: Japanese
- Born: 8 June 1995 (age 31) Chiba, Japan
- Education: Chuo University
- Height: 1.69 m (5 ft 7 in)
- Weight: 60 kg (130 lb)

Sport
- Country: Japan
- Sport: Track and field
- Event(s): 60 metres 100 metres
- Club: Osaka Gas

Achievements and titles
- Personal bests: 60 m: 6.54 NIR (2019); 100 m: 10.22 (2019)
Medal record
Men's athletics
Representing Japan
World Junior Championships
Silver medal – second place	2014 Eugene	4×100 m relay
Asian Junior Championships
Gold medal – first place	2014 Taipei	100 m
Gold medal – first place	2014 Taipei	4×100 m relay

Takuya Kawakami (川上 拓也, Kawakami Takuya; born 8 June 1995 in Chiba) is a Japanese track and field sprinter. His personal best is 10.22 seconds in the 100 metres and 6.54 seconds in the indoor 60 metres. The latter is the current Japanese indoor record. He won a silver medal in the 4 × 100 metres relay at the 2014 World Junior Championships, with teammates Yoshihide Kiryu, Yuki Koike and Masaharu Mori.

== Personal bests ==
Event	Time (s)	Venue	Date	Notes
60 m	6.54 (Indoor)	Birmingham, United Kingdom	16 February 2019	Current NIR
100 m	10.22 (wind: +1.0 m/s)	Fujiyoshida, Japan	1 September 2019	
100 m	10.09 (wind: +4.5 m/s)	Hiratsuka, Japan	10 June 2017	Wind-assisted

== International competition ==
Year	Competition	Venue	Position	Event	Time (s)	Notes
Representing Japan
2014	Asian Junior Championships	Taipei, Taiwan	1st	100 m	10.47 (wind: +0.3 m/s)	
2014	Asian Junior Championships	Taipei, Taiwan	1st	4×100 m relay	39.49 (relay leg: 1st)	
2014	World Junior Championships	Eugene, United States	8th (sf)	100 m	10.47 (wind: -0.3 m/s)	
2014	World Junior Championships	Eugene, United States	2nd	4×100 m relay	39.02 (relay leg: 1st)	SB

== National titles ==
Year	Competition	Venue	Event	Time (s)
Representing Chuo University
2016	National University Championships	Kumagaya, Saitama	4×100 m relay	38.92 (relay leg: 1st)
2017	National University Championships	Fukui, Fukui	4×100 m relay	39.40 (relay leg: 1st)
2017	National Championships	Yokohama, Kanagawa	4×100 m relay	39.30 (relay leg: 1st)
