= Kenzo Cotton =

American track and field athlete (born 1996)

Personal information
- Born: May 13, 1996 (age 30) La Vista, Nebraska, U.S.
- Height: 6 ft 2 in (1.88 m)

Sport
- Sport: Sprinting
- Events: 60 metres 100 metres 200 metres
- College team: Arkansas Razorbacks track and field
- Club: Arkansas Track Club
- Turned pro: 2018

Achievements and titles
- Personal bests: 100m: 9.96 w (Austin, Tx 2018); 200m: 20.20 w (Austin, Tx 2017); 400m: 47.26 (Fayetteville, Ark 2015)
Medal record
Men's athletics
Representing the United States
2013 World Youth Championships
2013 Donetsk	100 m

Kenzo Cotton (born May 13, 1996) is an American sprinter. Cotton competed in the boy's 100 meters at the 2013 World Youth Championships in Athletics. Cotton is 2015 NCAA Division I Outdoor Track and Field Championships 4x100 m champion, a 19-time NCAA Division I All-American and Southeastern Conference champion. Cotton won two Junior Olympic Championship titles, and won two USA (U 18) titles.

== Career ==
Cotton is a 2 time Junior Olympic Champion, and won 2 USA (U 18) titles.

Year	Competition	Venue	Position	Event	Notes
IAAF Championships
2013	2013 World Youth Championships	RSC Olimpiyskiy Donetsk, Ukraine	24th place	100 meters	12.35
USATF Championships
2018	2018 USA Outdoor Track and Field Championships	Drake University	9th place	100 metres	10.14
2018	2018 USA Outdoor Track and Field Championships	Drake University	5th place	200 metres	20.817
2017	2017 USA Outdoor Track and Field Championships	Sacramento State University	18th place	100 metres	10.18
2017	2017 USA Outdoor Track and Field Championships	Sacramento State University	8th place	200 metres	20.78
2016	2016 United States Olympic Trials (track and field)	University of Oregon	14th place	100 metres	10.11
2016	2016 United States Olympic Trials (track and field)	University of Oregon	10th place	200 metres	20.43
2013	US World Youth Trials	Southern Illinois University Edwardsville	1st place	100 metres	10.69
2013	US World Youth Trials	Southern Illinois University Edwardsville	1st place	200 metres	21.26
2012	USATF National Junior Olympic Track & Field Championships	Hughes Stadium (Morgan State)	1st place	100 metres	10.71
2012	USATF National Junior Olympic Track & Field Championships	Hughes Stadium (Morgan State)	1st place	200 metres	21.27
2011	USATF National Junior Olympic Track & Field Championships	Wichita State University	3rd place	100 metres	10.87
2011	USATF National Junior Olympic Track & Field Championships	Wichita State University	3rd place	200 metres	22.15

== NCAA ==
Cotton is 2015 NCAA Division I Outdoor Track and Field Championships 4x100 m champion, a 19-time NCAA Division I All-American and Southeastern Conference champion.

Representing University of Arkansas
School Year	Southeastern Conference Indoor track and field Championship	NCAA Indoor track and field Championship	Southeastern Conference Outdoor Track and Field Championship	NCAA Outdoor Track and Field Championship
2018 Senior	60 m - 6.59 - 1st	60 m - 6.66 - 10th	100 m - 10.24 - 7th	100 m - 10.14 - 13th
2018 Senior	200 m - 20.61 - 2nd	200 m - 21.85 - 7th	200 m - 25.46 - 8th	200 m - 20.73 - 7th
2018 Senior			4x100 m - 38.76 - 2nd	4x100 m - 39.01 - 4th
2018 Senior				4x400 m - 3:04.53 - 6th
2017 Junior	60 m - 6.67 - 3rd	60 m - 6.70 - 8th	100 m - 10.23 - 4th	100 m - 10.11 - 10th
2017 Junior	200 m - 20.65 - 4th	200 m - 20.75 - 7th	200 m - 20.81 - 9th	200 m - 20.52 - 12th
2017 Junior			4x100 m - 39.02 - 2nd	4x100 m - 38.82 - 7th
2016 Sophomore	60 m - 6.63 - 3rd	60 m - 6.70 - 8th	100 m - 10.28 - 5th	100 m - 10.35 - 7th
2016 Sophomore	200 m - 20.66 - 4th	200 m - 20.74 - 3rd	200 m - 21.06 - 21st	200 m - 20.55 - 5th
2016 Sophomore			4x100 m - 38.96 - 2nd	4x100 m - 38.49 - 3rd
2016 Sophomore		4x400 m - 3:09.13 - 12th		
2015 Freshman			100 m - 10.32 - 11th	
2015 Freshman	200 m - 21.19 - 8th		200 m - 20.84 - 5th	
2015 Freshman		DMR - 9:40.83 - 8th		
2015 Freshman			4x100 m - 39.12 - 5th	4x100 m - 38.47 - 1st
2015 Freshman	4x400 m - 3:10.89 - 7th	4x400 m - 3:08.04 - 8th	4x400 m - 3:08.64 - 8th	4x400 m - 3:05.91 - 6th

== Early life and prep ==
Cotton won 2014 Nebraska Gatorade Track Athlete of the Year.

Cotton won 2013 Nebraska Gatorade Track Athlete of the Year.

Cotton graduated from Papillion La Vista High School c/o 2014 as a 8-time outdoor track and field NSAA state champion with high school personal best times of 21.30 (200 meters) and 47.66 (400 meters) which were Nebraska state records.

Cotton also held a personal best long jump of 20' 11.5.

Representing Papillion La Vista High School
Nebraska State Activities Association A state championship
Year	Outdoor Track
2014	1st in the 200 m (21.91)
2014	1st in the 400 m (47.66)
2013	1st in the 100 m (10.41)
2013	1st in the 200 m (21.54)
2013	1st in the 4x100 m (41.40)
2013	8th in the 4x400 m (3:26.36)
2012	1st in the 100 m (10.40)
2012	1st in the 200 m (21.30)
2012	6th in the 4x100 m (42.77)
2012	9th in the 4x400 m (3:26.60)
2011	3rd in the 100 m (10.97)
2011	1st in the 200 m (21.77)
2011	8th in the 4x100 m (43.86)
Year	Indoor Track
2013	1st in the 55 m (6.5)
2012	1st in the 60 m (6.31)
2012	1st in the 200 m (22.90)
2012	6th in the long jump (20' 11.5)
2011	6th in the 60 m (7.08)

In 2014, Cotton placed 1st in the 200 m (21.91) and 1st in the 400 m (47.66) at Nebraska State Activities Association A state meet.
