= Trayvon Bromell =

American sprinter (born 1995)

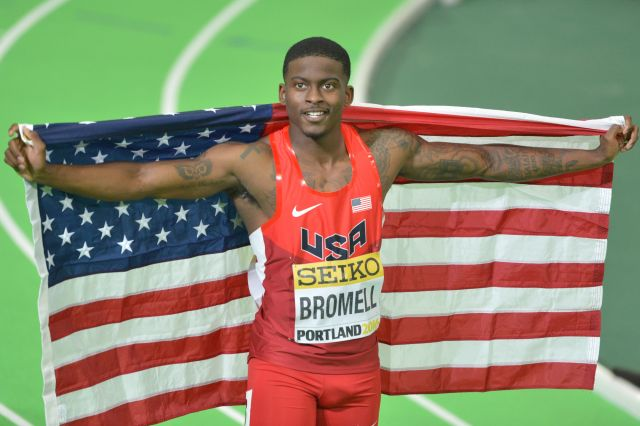
- Bromell at the 2016 World Indoor Championships in Portland

Personal information
- Born: July 10, 1995 (age 31) St. Petersburg, Florida, U.S.
- Employer: New Balance
- Height: 5 ft 8 in (173 cm)
- Weight: 156 lb (71 kg)

Sport
- Country: United States
- Sport: Track and field
- Event: Sprints
- College team: Baylor Bears (2014–2015)
- Turned pro: October 2015
- Coached by: Rana Reider (2019–2024); Mike Ford (2013–Present)

Achievements and titles
- Personal bests: 100 m: 9.76A (2021); 200 m: 20.03 (2015); Indoors; 60 m: 6.42 (2023, 26)
Medal record
Men's athletics
Representing the United States
World Championships
Gold medal – first place	2025 Tokyo	4 × 100 m relay
Bronze medal – third place	2015 Beijing	100 m
Bronze medal – third place	2022 Eugene	100 m
World Indoor Championships
Gold medal – first place	2016 Portland	60 m
Bronze medal – third place	2026 Toruń	60 m
Diamond League
First place	2022	100 m
World Junior Championships
Gold medal – first place	2014 Eugene	4 × 100 m relay
Silver medal – second place	2014 Eugene	100 m
Pan American Junior Championships
Gold medal – first place	2013 Medellín	4 × 100 m relay
Bronze medal – third place	2013 Medellín	100 m

Trayvon Jaquez Bromell (born July 10, 1995) is an American professional track and field athlete specializing in sprinting events. He won bronze medals in the 100 meters at the 2015 and 2022 World Championships. Bromell was the 2016 World indoor 60 meters champion, and competed for the United States at the 2016 Rio and 2020 Tokyo Olympics. He was the first junior to break the 10-second barrier in the 100 meters with a time of 9.97 seconds, the former junior world record.

Bromell's personal bests of 6.42 seconds in the 60 meters and 9.76 seconds in the 100 meters make him the joint sixth-fastest man of all time at those events. He was the 2022 Diamond League 100 m champion.

== Track career ==
=== 2013 ===
In May, competing for Gibbs High School in St. Petersburg, Florida, Bromell won the 100 m at the Florida High School Athletic Association 3A State Finals in 10.45 s, and was second in the 200 meters in 21.41 s.

On June 8 he had a brush with the 100 m high school record and junior world record, clocking his first sub-10 s run with an altitude-assisted time of 9.99 s at the Great Southwest Classic in Albuquerque, New Mexico. However, the race was wind-assisted with a +4.0 m/s tailwind, +2.0 m/s above the allowable limit for record keeping.

Later that month Bromell competed in the 100 m and the 200 m at the New Balance Nationals Outdoor. In the 100 m he won his preliminary in 10.31 s before winning the final in 10.45 s, run into a −2.4 m/s headwind. In the 200 m he lowered his personal best twice with times of 20.96 s in the preliminary and 20.91 s in the final despite headwinds. However, he still had to settle for second in the final. Bromell headed to the USA Junior Outdoor Track & Field Championships a few days later to compete in the 100 m on day one and the 200 m on day two. On day one he won his semi in 10.56 s into a −2.7 m/s headwind and the final again in 10.48 s with a much stronger −4.8 m/s headwind, winning his first USATF title in the 100 m. On day two Bromell was disqualified after his semi for stepping out of his lane during the race, and did not compete in the 200 m final.

After the national championships he was named the Gatorade Track and Field Athlete of the Year for 2013.

With his win in the 100 m he qualified to represent the United States in the 100 m and the 4 × 100 meters relay at international championships that year. Two months later in August Bromell competed in the Pan American Junior Championships in Medellín, Colombia where he competed in the 100 m and the 4 × 100 m relay. He placed third in the 100 m to earn his first international medal, and then anchored the United States to victory in the 4 × 100 m relay to earn his first international gold medal.

=== 2014 ===
On March 29, 2014, Bromell tied the world junior record in the 100 meters, running a 10.01 at the Texas Relays in Austin, Texas, while representing Baylor University. Just one day before the race, Bromell came within .01 of the record with a 10.02. Following the meet, Bromell was named "2014 Texas Relays Most Outstanding Performer." The last Baylor athlete to receive the same honor was Michael Johnson, 24 years earlier.

On June 13, 2014, Bromell ran 9.92 in the semifinals at the NCAA Men's Outdoor Track and Field Championships at Hayward Field in Eugene, Oregon, but that result did not enter the record books, because it was ruled wind-assisted due to a +2.2 mps tail-wind with +2.0 mps being the maximum allowable tail-wind for times to be considered legal. The following day, he ran 9.97 in the final with a legal +1.8mps wind. Pending ratification, that gave him sole possession of the men's 100 m record. Bromell became the first freshman since Walter Dix in 2005 to win the 100 meters at the NCAA Outdoor Championships.

At the end of May 2014, Bromell ran a time of 9.77 at the Big 12 Championships. However, the record-time was nullified by a +4.2 m/s tail-wind. The meet was at Lubbock, Texas, where the altitude is just eight meters below an elevation that would qualify marks for altitude assistance. Meet officials also reversed the direction of the race to take advantage of the wind. At the time, Bromell's time of 9.77 was the ninth-fastest wind-aided 100 meter result of all time.

=== 2015 ===
In 2015, he returned to Eugene at the NCAA Championships, improving his personal best time to 9.90 in the preliminary round of the 100 m.

At the 2015 USA Outdoor Track and Field Championships, in June 2015, Bromell won his first round heat in a personal best time of 9.84 seconds, tying him as the tenth fastest 100 m runner of all time with Canadian legends Donovan Bailey and Bruny Surin. He won his semi-final in a wind-aided 9.76 seconds (+3.7 m/s) to improve his all-conditions best, before going on to finish second in the final to Tyson Gay in 9.96 seconds. This qualified him for the 2015 World Championships in both the 100 m and 4 × 100 meters relay.

Bromell made his Diamond League debut at the 2015 Herculis meeting in Monaco, competing in the 100 m and 4 × 100 m relay. Although one of the favorites for the 100 m, Bromell false-started, thus disqualifying him. However, he was able to successfully lead-off his team to a victory in the 4 × 100 m in 37.87 seconds.

In August, Bromell arrived in Beijing for the World Championships. Bromell won his 100 meter heat in 9.91 seconds, and qualified for the final after finishing third in his semi-final in a fastest-loser time of 9.99 seconds. Bromell went on to tie for the bronze medal in the final, running 9.92 seconds to equal his college rival Andre De Grasse of Canada, whose 9.92 was a personal best. This was the first tie in World Championship 100m history. In the 4 × 100 meter relay, Bromell ran the lead leg once again in both the heats and the final. He was able to lead the United States team off to a victory in their heat, and a silver medal in the final. However, a mishap in the final exchange resulted in a disqualification for the team, stripping Bromell and his teammates of their medal. Bromell ended his season there, and went on to graduate from Baylor later in the year. He turned professional and signed an endorsement deal with sports company New Balance.

=== 2016 ===
2016 was set to be a breakout year for Bromell, after his achievements the year before. Trayvon set his sights on winning the gold medal at the 2016 Summer Olympics in the 100 m, and defeating the defending Olympic champion and fastest man in history, Usain Bolt of Jamaica, at the latter's final Olympic 100 m race.

Bromell decided to race indoors, competing in the 60 meters event. On March 12, 2016, he placed second in the 60 meters in 6.507 seconds at 2016 USA Indoor Track and Field Championships, and six days later, on March 18, 2016, Bromell improved his time by three hundredths of a second by winning the 60 meters title in 6.47s at the 2016 IAAF World Indoor Championships. Winning in front of a home crowd in Oregon, Bromell also beat Jamaican veteran Asafa Powell, who ran 6.44 seconds in the heats and the semi-finals, both while easing down.

Bromell opened his outdoor season with a 200-meter race at the Waco Baylor Invitational. Not normally a 200 m runner, Bromell still won the race in a decent 20.30 seconds. He ran his first 100 m of the season at the Waco Michael Johnson Classic in 10.04 seconds. After a 7th-place finish in the 200 m at an IAAF Diamond League stop in Rome, Bromell pulled out of meets in Birmingham and Oslo, after suffering a grade one Achilles tendon sprain he got before the meet in Rome. He focused on recovering and making the US team in the 100 m at the Olympic Trials in Oregon.

In July, Bromell competed at the national trials. He won his heat in 9.94 seconds and his semi-final in 9.86 seconds, before going on to finish second in the final to 34-year-old veteran and fellow Florida resident Justin Gatlin, thus qualifying him to compete for the US at the Olympics with Gatlin and another Florida resident Marvin Bracy. Bromell's time of 9.84 seconds equaled his personal best, which he coincidentally set on the same venue (Hayward Field). Bromell focused all his time on prepping for Rio.

Not long after the trials, Bromell's injury came back, forcing him to pause on his prep for the Olympics. Bromell still decided to compete at Rio, in both the 100 m and 4 × 100 m relay.

Bromell arrived in Rio for the Olympics, and took part in the Parade of Nations on August 5, 2016. Eight days later, on August 13, 2016, he competed in his 100 m heat, where he finished second with 10.13 seconds, behind Ben Youssef Meite of the Ivory Coast. The next day, as with the year before, Bromell was drawn in the same semi-final as Andre De Grasse and Usain Bolt, and finished third once again behind the two. Bromell edged out Chijindu Ujah of Great Britain by 2 milliseconds to take the last qualifying spot for the final, in 10.01 seconds. Less than two hours later, Bromell raced in the final, finishing eighth in 10.06. Bromell rested up for the 4 × 100 m final, where he would switch places with Michael Rodgers to run anchor leg instead of first. In the final, Bromell struggled to keep up with the Japanese anchor Asuka Cambridge, and dove at the line to finish third just 2 hundredths behind him, but 2 hundredths ahead of Canada's anchor Andre De Grasse. Bromell fell to the ground in agonizing pain after his dive, and Rodgers helped him to his feet as the medical team helped him off the Track. While his team celebrated their bronze medal, a scan revealed Bromell had torn his Achilles once again. More disappointment came as it was revealed that an improper first exchange resulted in a disqualification, therefore stripping Bromell and his very same teammates from Beijing of their medal once again.

=== 2017 ===
After a disappointing 2016 season, Bromell was anxious to recover with a comeback. He set his sights on beating Bolt again, but this time at the 2017 World Championships. Bolt decided to only contest in the 100 m and 4 × 100 m that year, dropping the 200 m as it was harder to train for. The 100 m race at the championships was set to be his last individual race, and Bromell's last shot at Bolt's crown. However, healing took longer than expected, and Bromell barely raced during the season. His only race was on June 22, 2017, at the US National Championships in the 100 m, where he finished third in his heat with 10.22 seconds and did not advance to the semi-finals. Bromell avoided training and racing from then on to recover.

=== 2021 ===
Bromell returned to form in 2021, recording a personal best and world leading time of 9.77 seconds in the 100 m. He won the 2021 Olympic Trials ahead of Ronnie Baker and Fred Kerley.

At the 2020 Summer Olympics in Tokyo, Bromell failed to make the 100 m final after coming in third in his semi-final, one millisecond behind second-place finisher Enoch Adegoke of Nigeria with both runners being assigned an official time of 10.00 seconds. On September 18, Bromell competed at the Kip Keino Classic in Nairobi, Kenya placing first and beating his personal best by running a time of 9.76 seconds.

== Achievements ==
Information from World Athletics profile unless otherwise noted.

=== Personal bests ===
Event	Time (s)	Wind (m/s)	Venue	Date	Notes
60 m indoor	6.42	—N/a	Clemson, United States	February 10, 2023	#6th athlete all time
100 m	9.76 A	+1.2	Nairobi, Kenya	September 18, 2021	#6th athlete all time
200 m	20.03	+2.0	Eugene, United States	June 10, 2015	
200 m	19.86 w	+2.4	Eugene, United States	June 12, 2015	
200 m indoor	20.19	—N/a	Fayetteville, United States	March 14, 2015	
4 × 100 m relay	37.87	—N/a	Monaco, Monaco	July 17, 2015	

=== International competitions ===
Representing the United States
Year	Competition	Venue	Position	Event	Time	Wind (m/s)	Notes
2013	Pan American Junior Championships	Medellín, Colombia	3rd	100 m	10.44	+1.8	
2013	Pan American Junior Championships	Medellín, Colombia	1st	4 × 100 m relay	39.17	—N/a	PB
2014	World Junior Championships	Eugene, United States	2nd	100 m	10.28	−0.6	
2014	World Junior Championships	Eugene, United States	1st	4 × 100 m relay	38.70	—N/a	PB
2015	World Championships	Beijing, China	3rd	100 m	9.92	−0.5	
2015	World Championships	Beijing, China	DQ	4 × 100 m relay	—	—N/a	Illegal baton pass
2016	World Indoor Championships	Portland, United States	1st	60 m	6.47	—N/a	PB
2016	Olympic Games	Rio de Janeiro, Brazil	8th	100 m	10.06	+0.2	
2016	Olympic Games	Rio de Janeiro, Brazil	DQ	4 × 100 m relay	—	—N/a	Illegal baton pass
2021	Olympic Games	Tokyo, Japan	10th (sf)	100 m	10.00	-0.2	
2021	Olympic Games	Tokyo, Japan	7th (h)	4 × 100 m relay	38.10	—N/a	
2022	World Championships	Eugene, United States	3rd	100 m	9.88	-0.1	
2025	World Championships	Tokyo, Japan	4th (h)	4 × 100 m relay	37.98	—N/a	
2026	World Indoor Championships	Pomeranian, Poland	3rd	60 m	6.448	—N/a	
2026	World Ultimate Championship	Budapest, Hungary	16th (h)	100 m	11.34	−0.2	

=== National championships ===
Representing the Baylor Bears (2014–2015) and New Balance (2016–2021)
Year	Competition	Venue	Position	Event	Time	Wind (m/s)	Notes
2013	U.S. Junior Championships	Des Moines, Iowa	1st	100 m	10.47	−4.8	
2013	U.S. Junior Championships	Des Moines, Iowa	DQ (semi 2)	200 m	—	−3.4	Lane violation
2014	NCAA Division I Indoor Championships	Albuquerque, New Mexico	10th	60 m	6.65 A	—N/a	Altitude-assisted, PB
2014	NCAA Division I Championships	Eugene, Oregon	1st	100 m	9.97	+1.8	WJR, PB
2014	NCAA Division I Championships	Eugene, Oregon	DNF	4 × 100 m relay	—	—N/a	Did not finish
2014	U.S. Junior Championships	Eugene, Oregon	1st	100 m	10.07	+1.2	
2015	NCAA Division I Indoor Championships	Fayetteville, Arkansas	DQ (semi 2)	60 m	—	—N/a	False start
2015	NCAA Division I Indoor Championships	Fayetteville, Arkansas	1st	200 m	20.19	—N/a	WL, PB
2015	NCAA Division I Championships	Eugene, Oregon	2nd	100 m	9.88 w	+2.7	Wind-assisted
2015	NCAA Division I Championships	Eugene, Oregon	3rd	200 m	19.86 w	+2.4	Wind-assisted
2015	NCAA Division I Championships	Eugene, Oregon	15th	4 × 100 m relay	39.80	—N/a	
2015	U.S. Championships	Eugene, Oregon	2nd	100 m	9.96	0.0	
2016	U.S. Indoor Championships	Portland, Oregon	2nd	60 m	6.51	—N/a	PB
2016	U.S. Olympic Trials	Eugene, Oregon	2nd	100 m	9.84	+1.6	PB
2017	U.S. Championships	Sacramento, California	21st	100 m	10.22	+0.4	SB
2021	U.S. Olympic Trials	Eugene, Oregon	1st	100 m	9.80	+0.8	
2022	U.S. Championships	Eugene, Oregon	3rd	100 m	9.88	+1.8	
2023	U.S. Championships	Eugene, Oregon	6th	100 m	10.14	+0.1	
2025	U.S. Championships	Eugene, Oregon	4th	100 m	9.84	+1.8	
2026	U.S. Indoor Championships	Staten Island	2nd	60 m	6.47	—N/a	

- NCAA results from Track & Field Results Reporting System.

=== Circuit wins and titles ===
- Diamond League 100 m champion: 2022

100 m; other events specified in parentheses

- 2015: Monaco Herculis (4 × 100 m relay)
- 2021: Gateshead British Grand Prix
- 2022: Eugene Prefontaine Classic, Chorzów Kamila Skolimowska Memorial, Zürich Weltklasse

- World Athletics Indoor Tour (60 m)
  - 2021: New York New Balance Indoor Grand Prix

=== 100 m seasonal bests ===
Year	Time	Wind (m/s)	Venue	World rank
2012	10.40	+1.2	Orlando, United States	>100
2013	10.14	NWI	Charlotte, United States	59 (Note: Although no wind is listed for this performance, World Athletics still lists it as the joint 59th fastest performance of 2013.)
2013	10.27	+0.9	Orlando, United States	>100
2014	9.97	+1.8	Eugene, United States	13
2015	9.84	+1.3	Eugene, United States	4
2016	9.84	+1.6	Eugene, United States	3
2017	10.22	+0.4	Sacramento, United States	>100
2018	—N/a			
2019	10.54	+1.1	Montverde, United States	>100
2020	9.90	+1.4	Clermont, United States	2
2021	9.76	+1.2	Nairobi, Kenya	1
2022	9.81	+1.5	Eugene, United States	2

- World rank from World Athletics' Season Top Lists.

== See also ==
- 2020 in 100 metres

== Notes ==
Records
Preceded by (Trinidad and Tobago) Darrel Brown (United States) Jeff Demps	Men's junior world record holder 100 meters June 13, 2014 – July 15, 2022	Succeeded by (Botswana) Letsile Tebogo
