= Josh Clarke (sprinter) =

Australian track and field sprinter

Personal information
- Full name: Joshua Clarke
- Born: 19 May 1995 (age 31) Sydney, Australia
- Height: 1.80 m (5 ft 11 in)
- Weight: 85 kg (187 lb)

Sport
- Country: Australia
- Sport: Athletics
- Events: 100 m, 200 m
- Coached by: Matt Beckenham

Achievements and titles
- Personal bests: 10.15s (100 m); 20.66s (200 m)
Medal record
Men's athletics
Representing Australia
Commonwealth Youth Games
Bronze medal – third place	2011 Isle of Man	100 m
Australian Athletics Championships
Gold medal – first place	2013–2014 Melbourne	100 m
Gold medal – first place	2014–2015 Brisbane	100 m

Joshua Clarke (born 19 May 1995) is an Australian track and field sprinter. He is a former national 100-metre champion in Australia.

== Early life ==
Born in Sydney, Clarke studied at The King's School where he was coached by Nancy Atterton, a former sprinter and gold medalist in the 1954 British Empire and Commonwealth Games.

== Career ==
Clarke started running at a young age, In December 2010, he set an Under-16 record with a time of 10.72 seconds in the 100m competing for NSW. He competed in the Australian Junior Athletics Championships in the 2012/13 season finishing 3rd overall behind Jarrod Geddes and Hugh Donovan with a time of 10.58 seconds. He competed for Australia in the 2011 Commonwealth Youth Games where he competed in the 100m and the 4x 100metres events. He finished 3rd in the 100m final with a time of 10.53 seconds and he helped Australia finish 4th in the 4 × 100m relay.

He set a time of 10.36 seconds in the 2014 Junior Championships in Australia which puts him in 3rd place for the Australian Junior All-time list behind Matt Shirvington and Paul Narracott.

He also competed at the 2014 World Junior Championships and he finished 2nd in Heat 2 qualifying for the semi-finals with a time of 10.36 seconds but ran badly in the semis with a time of 10.79 seconds and not making the final.

In March 2015, he competed in the 93rd Australian Athletics Championships in Brisbane where he finished first in the 100m final with a time of 10.19 seconds just ahead of the Pacific Sprint-king, Banuve Tabakaucoro who ran 10.26 seconds.

Clarke won the 2016 ACT Athletics Championships with a time of 10.15 seconds qualifying him for the 2016 Olympic Games. His run moved him from tenth to fifth on the Australian All Time list just behind Patrick Johnson (9.93), Matt Shirvington (10.03), Josh Ross (10.08) and Damien Marsh (10.13). It was the fastest time set by an Australian in the 100m in eight and a half years.

In February 2016, he became Australia's first male sprinter in the 100m at the Olympics since 2004 Athens Olympics after he ran a personal best of 10.15 seconds to qualify for the 2016 Olympics.

In May 2017, he moved to Canberra and is now coached by Matt Beckenham who also coaches the national record holder for the women's 100m, Melissa Breen.

== Personal life ==
He is currently enrolled at The University of Sydney, working on a degree in commerce.

== Statistics ==
=== Personal bests ===
Event	Performance	Venue	Date
60 M	6.64	Sydney, Australia	14 February 2015
100 M	10.15	Canberra, Australia	6 February 2016
200 M	20.66	Sydney, Australia	10 January 2016
4 × 100m relay	40.09	Eugene, USA	26 July 2014
