= Mo Youxue =

Chinese sprinter (born 1996)

Personal information
- Nationality: Chinese
- Born: February 10, 1996 (age 30) Liuzhou, China
- Height: 1.80 m (5 ft 11 in)
- Weight: 147 lb (67 kg)

Sport
- Country: China
- Sport: Track and field
- Event(s): 100 metres, 200 metres

Achievements and titles
- Personal best: 100m：10.346 s
Medal record
Men's athletics
Representing China
World Championships
Silver medal – second place	2015 Beijing	4×100 m relay
World Youth Championships
Gold medal – first place	Donetsk 2013	100 m

Mo Youxue (莫有雪; born February 10, 1996) is a Chinese track and field sprint athlete who competes in the 100m and 200-meter dash events. He won a silver medal for China in the 4 x 100 metres relay at the 2015 World Championships in Beijing.

Mo was born in Bantang Hamlet 板塘屯, Bantang Village 板塘村, Chuanshan Town 穿山镇, Liujiang County, Liuzhou City, Guangxi Province, China.

His first major result was a gold medal at the 2013 World Youth Championships, where he ran a personal best and world youth leading time of 10.35, beating Ojie Edoburun in a photo finish.

He won a silver medal for China in the 4 x 100 metres relay at the 2015 World Championships in Beijing finishing behind Jamaica.

In late 2022, Youxue began coaching Deng Xinrui.

== Personal bests ==
- 100 metres: 10.346 seconds (2013)
- 200 metres: 20.96 seconds (2015)
