= Ojie Edoburun =

British track and field sprint athlete

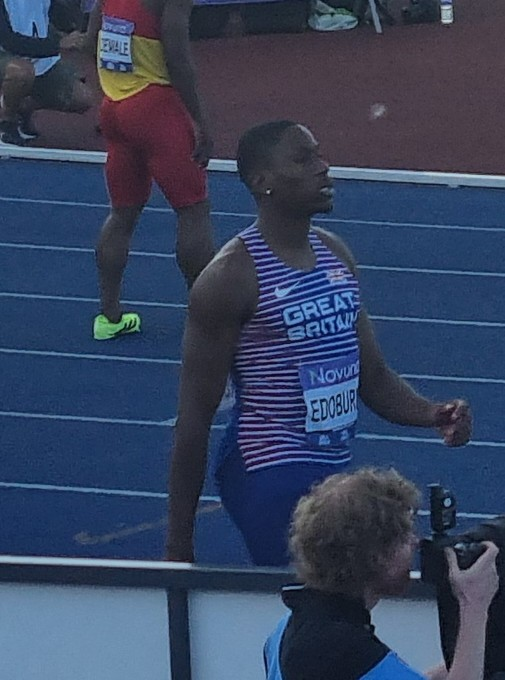
- Ojie Edoburun at the 2025 UK Athletics Championships

Personal information
- Nationality: British (English)
- Born: 2 June 1996 (age 30) London, England
- Height: 1.90 m (6 ft 3 in)

Sport
- Sport: Track and field
- Event(s): 100 metres, 200 metres

Achievements and titles
- Personal best(s): 100 m: 10.04 s (Prague 2018); 200 m: 21.29 s (Walnut 2014)
Medal record
Men's athletics
Representing Great Britain
European Under-23 Championships
Gold medal – first place	2017 Bydgoszcz	100 m
Silver medal – second place	2017 Bydgoszcz	4 x 100 m relay
European Junior Championships
Gold medal – first place	2015 Eskilstuna	100 m
World Youth Championships
Silver medal – second place	2013 Donetsk	100 m
Representing England
Commonwealth Games
Gold medal – first place	2022 Birmingham	4×100 m relay

Osarojie Dayo Edoburun (born 2 June 1996) is a British track and field sprint athlete who competes in the 100m and 200m events. He won a gold medal at the Commonwealth Games.

== Biography ==
Born in England, Edoburun is of Nigerian descent.

He is a European junior and under-23 champion in the 100 metres and competed at the 2013 World Youth Championships where he became second behind China's Mo Youxue in a then career best time of 10.35.

Edoburun became the British 100 metres champion after winning the 2019 British Athletics Championships.

He represented England at the 2022 Commonwealth Games in Birmingham and was a member of the England 4 x 400 metre relay team that won the gold medal.

== Personal bests ==
Event	Result	Venue	Date
Outdoor
100 m	10.04	(Czech Republic) Prague	4 June 2018
200 m	20.40	(United States) Gainesville, Fla.	29 April 2017
Indoor
60 m	6.66 s	(United Kingdom) London	10 February 2016
