= Akron Zips track and field =

American college track and field team

- University: University of Akron
- Head coach: Kendra Reimer-Gonzales
- Conference: MAC
- Location: Akron, Ohio
- Outdoor track: Lee R. Jackson Track & Field Complex
- Nickname: Zips
- Colors: Blue and gold

The Akron Zips track and field team is the track and field program that represents University of Akron. The Zips compete in NCAA Division I as a member of the Mid-American Conference. The team is based in Akron, Ohio, at the Lee R. Jackson Track & Field Complex.

The program is coached by Kendra Reimer-Gonzales. The track and field program officially encompasses four teams because the NCAA considers men's and women's indoor track and field and outdoor track and field as separate sports.

Pole vaulter Shawn Barber was the team's first three-time NCAA champion.

== Postseason ==
As of August 2025, a total of 16 men and 17 women have achieved individual first-team All-American status for the team at the Division I men's outdoor, women's outdoor, men's indoor, or women's indoor national championships (using the modern criteria of top-8 placing regardless of athlete nationality).

First team NCAA All-Americans
Team	Championships	Name	Event	Place	Ref.
Women's	1999 Outdoor	Christi Smith	Heptathlon	2nd	
Men's	2000 Outdoor	LeShaunte Edwards	200 meters	7th	
Women's	2000 Outdoor	Christi Smith	Heptathlon	1st	
Men's	2001 Indoor	LaShaunte Edwards	200 meters	8th	
Women's	2001 Indoor	Mary Varga	High jump	2nd	
Women's	2001 Outdoor	Mary Varga	Heptathlon	8th	
Men's	2003 Indoor	John Russell	Pole vault	7th	
Women's	2003 Indoor	Beata Rudzinska	800 meters	5th	
Women's	2003 Outdoor	Kira Sims	Pole vault	4th	
Women's	2003 Outdoor	Mary Varga	Heptathlon	8th	
Men's	2004 Indoor	John Russell	Pole vault	3rd	
Women's	2004 Indoor	Beata Rudzinska	800 meters	4th	
Women's	2004 Indoor	Kira Sims	Pole vault	5th	
Women's	2004 Outdoor	Beata Rudzinska	800 meters	4th	
Women's	2004 Outdoor	Kira Sims	Pole vault	4th	
Men's	2005 Indoor	Tomasz Smialek	High jump	6th	
Women's	2005 Indoor	Beata Rudzinska	800 meters	3rd	
Men's	2005 Outdoor	John Russell	Pole vault	3rd	
Women's	2005 Outdoor	Beata Rudzinska	800 meters	3rd	
Women's	2005 Outdoor	Ashley Kaufman	Javelin throw	7th	
Men's	2006 Indoor	John Russell	Pole vault	3rd	
Men's	2006 Outdoor	Tomasz Smialek	High jump	8th	
Men's	2006 Outdoor	John Russell	Pole vault	6th	
Men's	2008 Indoor	Auston Papay	Shot put	8th	
Women's	2008 Indoor	Stevi Large	Weight throw	5th	
Men's	2008 Outdoor	Cadeau Kelley	Long jump	7th	
Women's	2008 Outdoor	Stevi Large	Hammer throw	8th	
Women's	2009 Indoor	Stevi Large	Weight throw	2nd	
Women's	2009 Outdoor	Stevi Large	Hammer throw	1st	
Men's	2010 Indoor	Michael Uhle	Pole vault	5th	
Women's	2010 Indoor	Carrie Kayes	Pole vault	4th	
Men's	2010 Outdoor	Daniel Kinsey	Decathlon	6th	
Women's	2010 Outdoor	Carrie Keyes	Pole vault	7th	
Women's	2010 Outdoor	Valerie Wert	Hammer throw	6th	
Men's	2011 Outdoor	Willie Brown	800 meters	7th	
Men's	2013 Indoor	Shawn Barber	Pole vault	5th	
Men's	2013 Outdoor	Shawn Barber	Pole vault	3rd	
Women's	2013 Outdoor	Alexis Cooks	Discus throw	6th	
Women's	2013 Outdoor	Brittany Funk	Hammer throw	6th	
Men's	2014 Indoor	Shawn Barber	Pole vault	1st	
Men's	2014 Indoor	Alex McCune	Heptathlon	6th	
Women's	2014 Indoor	Annika Roloff	Pole vault	3rd	
Women's	2014 Indoor	Brittany Funk	Weight throw	8th	
Men's	2014 Outdoor	Shawn Barber	Pole vault	2nd	
Men's	2014 Outdoor	Alex McCune	Decathlon	6th	
Women's	2014 Outdoor	Annika Roloff	Pole vault	1st	
Women's	2014 Outdoor	Alexis Cooks	Discus throw	4th	
Women's	2014 Outdoor	Brittany Funk	Hammer throw	4th	
Men's	2015 Indoor	Clayton Murphy	800 meters	3rd	
Men's	2015 Indoor	Shawn Barber	Pole vault	1st	
Women's	2015 Indoor	Claudia Garcia Jou	High jump	2nd	
Women's	2015 Indoor	Brittany Funk	Weight throw	5th	
Men's	2015 Outdoor	Clayton Murphy	800 meters	3rd	
Men's	2015 Outdoor	Shawn Barber	Pole vault	1st	
Women's	2015 Outdoor	Claudia Garcia Jou	High jump	6th	
Women's	2015 Outdoor	Alexis Cooks	Shot put	8th	
Women's	2015 Outdoor	Alexis Cooks	Discus throw	6th	
Men's	2016 Indoor	Clayton Murphy	800 meters	1st	
Women's	2016 Indoor	Claudia Garcia Jou	High jump	3rd	
Men's	2016 Outdoor	Clayton Murphy	1500 meters	1st	
Women's	2016 Outdoor	Claudia Garcia Jou	High jump	3rd	
Women's	2016 Outdoor	Caroline Hasse	Pole vault	7th	
Men's	2017 Indoor	Matt Ludwig	Pole vault	3rd	
Men's	2017 Indoor	Terrell McClain	Long jump	6th	
Women's	2017 Indoor	Lucy Bryan	Pole vault	4th	
Men's	2017 Outdoor	Matt Ludwig	Pole vault	1st	
Men's	2017 Outdoor	Terrell McClain	Long jump	4th	
Women's	2017 Outdoor	Nikki Manson	High jump	5th	
Women's	2017 Outdoor	Jaclyn Siefring	Heptathlon	5th	
Men's	2018 Indoor	Matt Ludwig	Pole vault	4th	
Women's	2018 Indoor	Lucy Bryan	Pole vault	7th	
Women's	2018 Indoor	Jaclyn Siefring	Pentathlon	4th	
Men's	2018 Outdoor	Matt Ludwig	Pole vault	2nd	
Men's	2018 Outdoor	Jordan Latimer	Long jump	2nd	
Women's	2018 Outdoor	Lucy Bryan	Pole vault	6th	
Men's	2019 Indoor	Matt Ludwig	Pole vault	4th	
Men's	2019 Indoor	Jordan Latimer	Long jump	7th	
Men's	2019 Outdoor	Jordan Latimer	Long jump	8th	
Women's	2019 Outdoor	Lucy Bryan	Pole vault	5th	
Men's	2021 Indoor	Hunter Garretson	Pole vault	8th	
Men's	2023 Outdoor	Hunter Garretson	Pole vault	2nd	
Men's	2025 Indoor	Hunter Garretson	Pole vault	3rd	

== See also ==
- Category:Akron Zips men's track and field athletes (6)
- Category:Akron Zips women's track and field athletes (4)
