= 2018 NCAA Division I Outdoor Track and Field Championships =

- Edition: 97th (Men); 37th (Women)
- Dates: June 6–9, 2018
- Host city: Eugene, Oregon; University of Oregon
- Venue: Hayward Field
- Events: 42

The 2018 NCAA Division I Outdoor Track and Field Championships were the 97th NCAA Men's Division I Outdoor Track and Field Championships and the 37th NCAA Women's Division I Outdoor Track and Field Championships held for the sixth consecutive year at Hayward Field in Eugene, Oregon on the campus of the University of Oregon. In total, forty-two different men's and women's track and field events were contested from Wednesday June 6 to Saturday June 9, 2018.

== Results ==
=== Men's events ===
==== Men's 100 meters ====
Needing points in pursuit of the team title, the University of Houston was hoping to score with its three sprinters Cameron Burrell, Elijah Hall, and Mario Burke in the final of the 100 m on June 8. Though a headwind prevented fast times, Burrell and Hall were able to accelerate and out-lean Florida State University's Andre Ewers, considered by some to be the favorite, at the finish to score 18 points in addition to Burke's one point for finish eighth. In a post-race interview with ESPN, Burrell said he dedicated his win in this race to teammate Brian Barazza who fell after leading in the 3000 m steeplechase hours before.

Wind: -0.9 m/s

Rank	Name	University	Time	Notes
1st place, gold medalist(s)	Cameron Burrell	Houston	10.13	
2nd place, silver medalist(s)	Elijah Hall	Houston	10.17	
3rd place, bronze medalist(s)	(Jamaica) Andre Ewers	Florida State	10.19	
4	Cravon Gillespie	Oregon	10.27	
5	(Jamaica) Raheem Chambers	Auburn	10.33	
6	McKinely West	Southern Miss.	10.36	
7	(Antigua and Barbuda) Cejhae Greene	Georgia	10.37	
8	(Barbados) Mario Burke	Houston	10.41	

==== Men's 200 meters ====
The men's 200 m was won by Texas Tech University's Divine Oduduru on May 8. Running into a strong headwind of 3.1 meters per second, Oduduru ran 20.28 seconds to win the title by only one one-hundredth of a second over 100m contenter Andre Ewers of Florida State University.

Wind: 0.0 m/s

Rank	Athlete	Team	Time	Notes
1st place, gold medalist(s)	(Nigeria) Divine Oduduru	Texas Tech	20.28	
2nd place, silver medalist(s)	(Jamaica) Andre Ewers	Florida State	20.29	
3rd place, bronze medalist(s)	Kendal Williams	Georgia	20.32	
4	Jaron Flournoy	LSU	20.43	
5	Rodney Rowe	N. Carolina A&T	20.52	
6	Mustaqeem Williams	Tennessee	20.62	
7	Kenzo Cotton	Arkansas	20.73	
8	McKinely West	Southern Miss.	20.84	

==== Men's 400 meters ====
Having set the indoor 400 m world record and having not lost a race all year, the University of Southern California's Michael Norman was considered the prohibitive favorite in the men's 400 m on June 8. Before the race, he said his goal was to beat Olympic gold medalist Quincy Watts, his coach's personal best in the event, which would have also been a collegiate record. Despite a fleeting rain, Norman ran conservatively in the beginning but pulled a late charge to win the race in 43.61 seconds, a new collegiate record and a time that made him among the 15 fastest performers of all time. The University of Auburn's Akeem Bloomfield also ran under 44 seconds and his teammate Nathon Allen ran 44.1 seconds, both among the top collegiate times in history, leading some to call the race the greatest collegiate 400m of all time.

Rank	Name	University	Time	Notes
1st place, gold medalist(s)	Michael Norman	USC	43.61	PB CR FR NCAAR
2nd place, silver medalist(s)	(Jamaica) Akeem Bloomfield	Auburn	43.94	PB
3rd place, bronze medalist(s)	(Jamaica) Nathon Allen	Auburn	44.13	PB
4	Mar'yea Harris	Iowa	45.00	
5	Tyrell Richard	South Carolina St.	45.10	
6	Obi Igbokwe	Arkansas	45.16	
7	Kahmari Montgomery	Houston	45.75	
8	Wil London	Baylor	46.20	

==== Men's 800 meters ====
The University of Texas at El Paso's Michael Saruni, coming off his collegiate record, was considered the favorite for the men's 800 m on June 8. Texas A&M University's Devin Dixon led the field through a quick 400 m split, and soon Saruni and Penn State University's Isaiah Harris were both in contention with a lap to go. But with 300 meters to go, Saruni abruptly accelerated, leaving him with less energy on the final stretch as Harris and eventually Mississippi State University's Marco Arop passed him, with Harris taking his first NCAA title in a quick personal best time of 1:44.76.

Rank	Athlete	Team	Time	Notes
1st place, gold medalist(s)	Isaiah Harris	Penn State	1:44.76	PB
2nd place, silver medalist(s)	(Canada) Marco Arop	Miss State	1:45.25	PB
3rd place, bronze medalist(s)	(Kenya) Michael Saruni	UTEP	1:45.31	
4	Bryce Hoppel	Kansas	1:45.67	PB
5	Devin Dixon	Texas A&M	1:45.86	
6	(Kenya) Jonah Koech	UTEP	1:46.23	PB
7	Robert Ford	USC	1:46.72	
8	(Canada) Robert Heppenstall	Wake Forest	1:47.14	

==== Men's 1500 meters ====
The University of New Mexico's Josh Kerr was the favorite for the men's 1500 m on June 8 on account of being the defending champion and collegiate record-holder. Before the race, he had mentioned wanting to break his own collegiate record in the final on June 8, but wet conditions didn't allow it as the field went out in 61 seconds for the first 400 m. In a late surge, the unheralded Ollie Hoare passed Kerr in the final 100 meters to become the University of Wisconsin's first champion in this event in over 40 years.

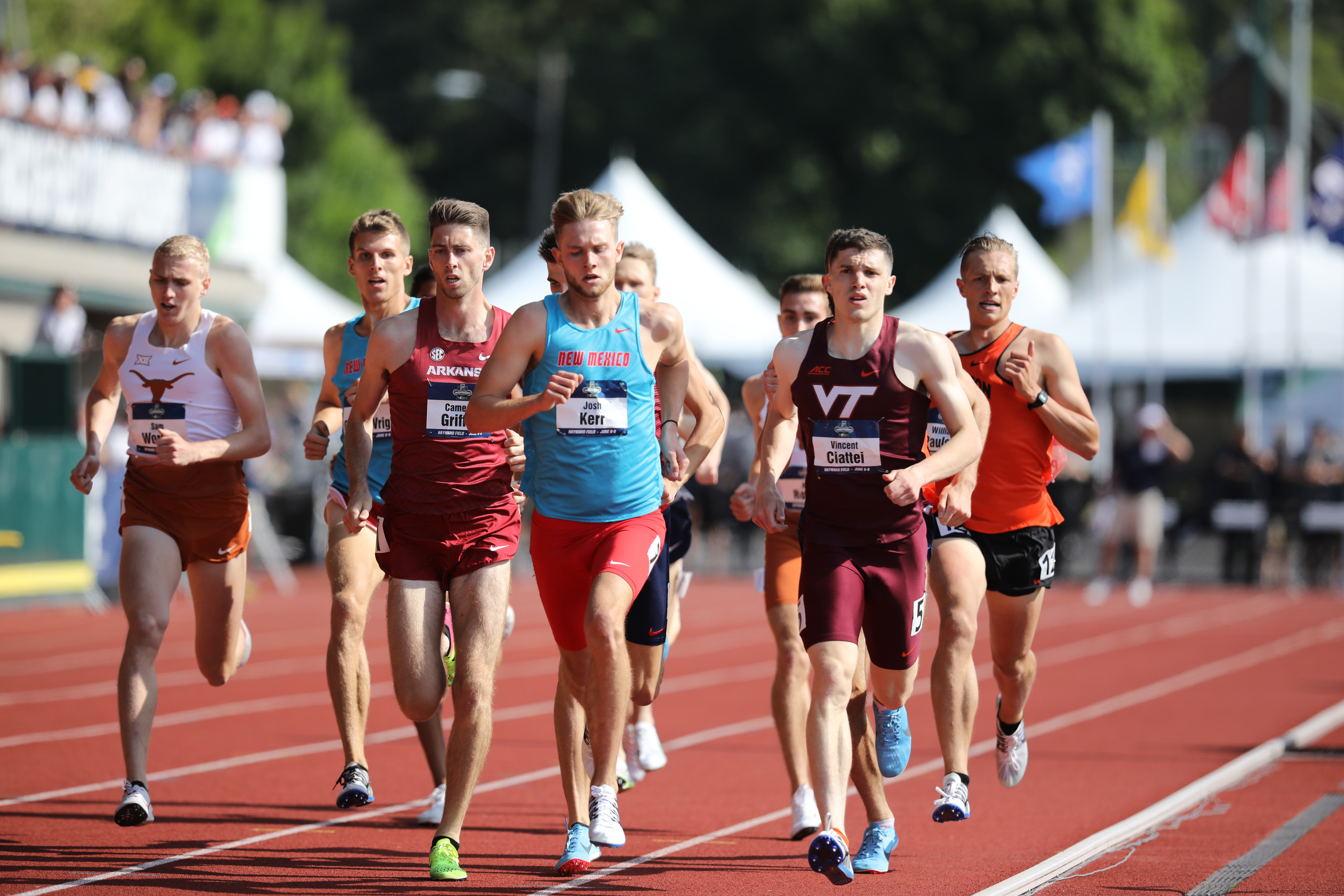

Rank	Athlete	Team	Time	Notes
1st place, gold medalist(s)	(Australia) Ollie Hoare	Wisconsin	3:44.77	
2nd place, silver medalist(s)	Vincent Ciattei	Virginia Tech	3:45.02 (3:45.012)	
3rd place, bronze medalist(s)	(United Kingdom) Josh Kerr	New Mexico	3:45.02 (3:45.015)	
4	Robert Domanic	Ole Miss	3:45.47	
5	Sam Worley	Texas	3:45.67	
6	Sam Prakel	Oregon	3:45.73	
7	(Kenya) Justine Kiprotich	Michigan State	3:45.75 (3:45.744)	
8	(Australia) Cameron Griffith	Arkansas	3:45.75 (3:45.747)	
9	(Germany) Amos Bartelsmeyer	Georgetown	3:46.54	
10	Diego Zarate	Virginia Tech	3:46.55	
11	Mike Marsella	Virginia	3:52.39	
12	Mick Stanovsek	Oregon	3:56.12	

==== Men's 5000 meters ====
Former indoor and outdoor 5000 m champions Justyn Knight and Grant Fisher were among the favorites in the men's 5000 m on June 8. Despite finishing in the last three places in the 10,000 m two days prior to the race, Brigham Young University's three runners were also expected to factor on suspicion that they had purposefully ran the 10,000 m easily to avoid getting disqualified from the meet and focus solely on the 5000 m. Wet conditions and a championship-style tactical race prevented fast times as only one athlete in the field set a personal best. Ultimately, Stanford University senior Sean McGorty finished the strongest as he took the individual title, with his teammate Fisher being passed by Knight in the final ten meters. The strong finish of Stanford runners scored them sixteen points in this event, which contributed to briefly allowing Stanford to lead the overall team title standings.

Rank	Athlete	Team	Time	Notes
1st place, gold medalist(s)	Sean McGorty	Stanford	13:54.81	
2nd place, silver medalist(s)	(Canada) Justyn Knight	Syracuse	13:55.03	
3rd place, bronze medalist(s)	Grant Fisher	Stanford	13:55.04	
4	Andy Trouard	Northern Arizona	13:55.46	
5	(Kenya) Amon Kemboi	Campbell	13:56.37	
6	Dillon Maggard	Utah State	13:57.40	
7	(Kenya) Edwin Kurgat	Iowa State	13:58.01	
8	(Canada) Rory Linkletter	BYU	13:58.20	
9	(Kenya) Vincent Kiprop	Alabama	13:59.60	
10	Jaret Carpenter	Purdue	14:00.01	
11	Cole Rockhold	Colorado St.	14:00.96	
12	Clayton Young	BYU	14:02.17	
13	(Kenya) Gilbert Kigen	Alabama	14:03.06	
14	Philo Germano	Syracuse	14:03.57	
15	Conor Lundy	Princeton	14:04.08	PB
16	Ben Veatch	Indiana	14:06.40	
17	Cooper Teare	Oregon	14:08.18	
18	(Kenya) Lawrence Kipkoech	Campbell	14:11.95	
19	Zach Perrin	Colorado	14:16.56	
20	(Kenya) Alfred Chelanga	Alabama	14:19.36	
21	(Australia) Chartt Miller	Iona	14:20.90	
22	Colby Gilbert	Washington	14:27.22	
23	Zach Long	Tennessee	14:28.97	
24	Connor McMillan	BYU	14:29.12	

==== Men's 10,000 meters ====
With last year's champion Marc Scott having graduated, the University of Alabama's Vincent Kiprop, a Kenyan transfer from the NCAA Division II school Missouri Southern State University, was considered the favorite. He was helped in the final by fellow Kenyans and Alabama transfers Gilbert Kigen and Alfred Chelanga, who ran together at a quick pace of 4:22 for the first 1600 m. In the next two miles, the pace substantially slowed as Northern Arizona University runners Tyler Day and Matthew Baxter caught up and alternated the lead. The field remained tightly packed, with the top eight athletes less than two seconds apart at 8000 m which Kiprop first passed in 22:59. With two laps remaining, the top six of Kiprop, Day, Baxter, the University of Michigan's Ben Flanagan, Thomson, and Dillon Maggard began to separate. Kiprop attempted to lengthen his lead with one lap to go, but Flanagan remained in tow and passed Kiprop in the final 50 meters. Directly at the conclusion of the race, he told ESPN cameras, "Where's my mom?" Flanagan's final time of 28:34 was a thirty-nine second improvement over his previous best of 29:13. Flanagan credited staying "as patient as possible" in part for his win. His victory was the first by a Canadian in this event at the NCAA championships since 2012, when Cam Levins won the title.

Rank	Name	Team	Time	Notes
1st place, gold medalist(s)	(Canada) Ben Flanagan	Michigan	28:34.53	PB
2nd place, silver medalist(s)	(Kenya) Vincent Kiprop	Alabama	28:34.99	
3rd place, bronze medalist(s)	Dillon Maggard	Utah State	28:38.36	PB
4	Tyler Day	Northern Arizona	28:39.03	
5	(New Zealand) Matthew Baxter	Northern Arizona	28:39.35	
6	Jacob Thomson	Kentucky	28:40.50	PB
7	(Kenya) Gilbert Kigen	Alabama	28:55.66	
8	Robert Brandt	UCLA	29:13.12	
9	Colin Bennie	Syracuse	29:13.66	
10	(France) Arsène Guillorel	Samford	29:16.71	
11	Grant Fischer	Colorado St.	29:20.73	
12	Connor McMillan	BYU	29:32.65	
13	(Kenya) Lawrence Kipkoech	Campbell	29:34.52	
14	Michael Crozier	Georgetown	29:38.21	
15	Frank Lara	Furman	29:42.87	
16	(Kenya) Alfred Chelanga	Alabama	29:44.08	
17	(France) Emmanuel Roudolff-Levisse	Portland	29:45.39	
18	Jonathan Green	Georgetown	29:46.57	
19	Nahom Solomon	Georgia Tech	29:46.96	
20	Matt Welch	Portland	30:02.69	
21	(Canada) Mike Tate	Southern Utah	30:14.75	
22	Conner Mantz	BYU	31:37.34	
23	Clayton Young	BYU	31:37.54	
24	(Canada) Rory Linkletter	BYU	31:37.69	

==== Men's 110-meter hurdles ====
Defending champion Grant Holloway of the University of Florida won the men's 110 m hurdles on June 8. Holloway had a fast start and built up a lead 50 meters into the race, but as he approached the finish both the University of Illinois' David Kendziera and Damion Thomas of Louisiana State University began to make up ground, leaning at the finish line but ultimately coming up short.

Wind: -0.9 m/s

Rank	Athlete	Team	Time	Notes
1st place, gold medalist(s)	Grant Holloway	Florida	13.42	
2nd place, silver medalist(s)	David Kendziera	Illinois	13.43	
3rd place, bronze medalist(s)	(Jamaica) Damion Thomas	LSU	13.45	
4	Trey Cunningham	Florida State	13.64	
5	Antoine Lloyd	Nebraska	13.94	
6	(Trinidad and Tobago) Ruebin Walters	Alabama	13.95	
7	Luke Siedhoff	Nebraska	13.99	
8	John Burt	Texas	14.01	

==== Men's 400-meter hurdles ====
The men's 400 m hurdles took place on May 8. The University of Southern California's Rai Benjamin attracted attention during the prelims by stepping twelve times (as compared to the standard thirteen or more) between each hurdle, a feat that only world record holder Kevin Young had notably achieved before. During the final, which took place soon after Southern California teammate Michael Norman set the collegiate record in the flat 400 m, Benjamin stuttered at one of the early hurdles but ultimately pulled away from the field late to run a time of 47.02 seconds. The time was not only a personal best by nearly a full second, but it was also a championship record, Hayward Field facility record, national record for Antigua and Barbuda, an NCAA collegiate record, and the equal number-two performance of all time, behind only Kevin Young's 46-second performance and equal to Edwin Moses' 1983 former World Record. The time came as a surprise to many who thought that the wet conditions and puddles on the track were not conducive to running fast times.

Rank	Athlete	Team	Time	Notes
1st place, gold medalist(s)	(Antigua and Barbuda) Rai Benjamin	USC	47.02	PB CR FR NCAAR
2nd place, silver medalist(s)	Kenny Selmon	North Carolina	48.12	PB
3rd place, bronze medalist(s)	David Kendziera	Illinois	48.42	PB
4	(Jamaica) Kemar Mowatt	Arkansas	48.83	
5	Taylor McLaughlin	Michigan	49.59	PB
6	Jacob Smith	Northern Iowa	50.60	
7	(Latvia) Maksims Sincukovs	Arizona	50.63	
8	Infinite Tucker	Texas A&M	50.76	

==== Men's 3000-meter steeplechase ====
There was no clear favorite in the men's 3000 m steeplechase, as the collegiate yearly leader did not qualify and no scoring athletes returned from last year's final. Most expected the race to be tactical due to wet conditions, but the University of Houston's Brian Barraza gapped the field early, taking the race out at an 8:20 pace for the first few laps—a time that was over ten seconds faster than any of the athletes' personal bests. The frontrunning strategy seemed to have been working as Barazza still held a considerable lead going in to the last lap, but a fall on one of the last barriers allowed the University of Minnesota's Obsa Ali to pass and win the race in a personal-best time of 8:32 minutes. Barraza had trouble getting up after his fall, and ultimately finished tenth. As Houston was considered by some to be a contender for the team title, Barazza's bold race strategy was considered foolish by some but brave by others. After the race, Barraza's coach Steve Magness said that Barraza felt dazed after the race, and that he was considering being checked for a concussion. The fall was later featured on ESPN's SportsCenter.

Rank	Name	University	Time	Notes
1st place, gold medalist(s)	Obsa Ali	Minnesota	8:32.23	PB
2nd place, silver medalist(s)	(United Kingdom) Jamaine Coleman	Eastern Kentucky	8:33.52	PB
3rd place, bronze medalist(s)	Steven Fahy	Stanford	8:34.52	PB
4	Aidan Tooker	Syracuse	8:35.41	PB
5	Andrew Gardner	Washington	8:37.07	PB
6	Matt Owens	BYU	8:38.09	
7	Clayson Shumway	BYU	8:40.15	
8	Riley Osen	Portland	8:41.24	PB
9	Noah Affolder	Syracuse	8:43.72	
10	Brian Barraza	Houston	8:44.42	
11	Max Benoit	Michigan State	8:47.15	
12	John Rice	Texas	8:52.81	

==== Men's 4 x 100-meter relay ====
Despite rain on the track, the University of Houston won the men's 4x100 m in a new collegiate-record time of 38.17 seconds. The prior record had stood for 30 years.

Rank	Team	Time	Notes
1st place, gold medalist(s)	Houston	38.17	CR FR NCAAR
2nd place, silver medalist(s)	Ohio State	38.75	
3rd place, bronze medalist(s)	Florida	38.89	
4	Arkansas	39.01	
5	Florida State	39.37	
6	Southern Miss.	39.49	
7	Northwestern St.	39.63	
	N. Carolina A&T	DNF	

==== Men's 4 x 400-meter relay ====
Though the 4 x 400 m was the final men's event of the championships, the team title was already decided as the University of Georgia's points lead was too great for any other team to overtake them in the relays. Nevertheless, the University of Southern California won the event and set a new collegiate record of 2:59.00 minutes. The four-man team included both new NCAA record-holders Michael Norman (in the flat 400 m) and Rai Benjamin (in the 400 m hurdles), and both athletes ran under 44 seconds for their legs to have the two fastest split times in the field. Despite Norman having held the third-fastest split time in history with a 43.03 split at the NCAA West Regional, it was Benjamin who had the faster split of 43.6 seconds in the race on June 8. Norman, who was the anchor, ran largely alone for his leg as he received the baton in the lead and the team won by nearly a full second.

Rank	Team	Time	Notes
1st place, gold medalist(s)	USC	2:59.00	CR FR NCAAR
2nd place, silver medalist(s)	Texas A&M	2:59.91	
3rd place, bronze medalist(s)	LSU	3:00.56	
4	Florida	3:01.83	
5	Houston	3:04.03	
6	Arkansas	3:04.53	
7	Baylor	3:04.54	
8	Stanford	3:05.50	

==== Men's long jump ====
Zach Baile of Ohio State University won the men's long jump on June 6 in a personal best distance of 8.37 m (27 ft 5 1/2 in).

Rank	Athlete	Team	Distance	Wind	Notes
1st place, gold medalist(s)	Zack Bazile	Ohio State	8.37 m (27 ft 5 1/2 in)	+1.9	PB
2nd place, silver medalist(s)	Jordan Latimer	Akron	8.02 m (26 ft 3 1/2 in)	+1.8	PB
3rd place, bronze medalist(s)	(Jamaica) Odaine Lewis	Texas Tech	7.99 m (26 ft 2 1/2 in)	+3.7	
4	Rayvon Grey	LSU	7.96 m (26 ft 1 1/4 in)	+3.1	
5	Charles Brown	Texas Tech	7.90 m (25 ft 11 in)	+2.4	
6	Kyle Darrow	Northeastern	7.88 m (25 ft 10 in)	+1.8	PB
7	KeAndre Bates	Florida	7.86 m (25 ft 9 1/4 in)	+0.5	
8	(Algeria) Tahar Triki	Texas A&M	7.86 m (25 ft 9 1/4 in)	+0.4	
9	Grant Holloway	Florida	7.83 m (25 ft 8 1/4 in)	+0.1	
10	Damarcus Simpson	Oregon	7.81 m (25 ft 7 1/4 in)	+1.2	
11	Terrell Mcclain	Akron	7.77 m (25 ft 5 3/4 in)	+2.8	
12	Julian Harvey	SIU Edwardsville	7.76 m (25 ft 5 1/2 in)	+1.8	
13	(France) Yann Randrianasolo	South Carolina	7.73 m (25 ft 4 1/4 in)	+1.4	
14	Harrison Schrage	Arkansas	7.70 m (25 ft 3 in)	+2.0	PB
15	Jonathan Wells	Illinois	7.65 m (25 ft 1 in)	+0.7	
16	Kenneth Fisher	Florida State	7.65 m (25 ft 1 in)	+1.9	
17	(United Kingdom) Jacob Fincham-Dukes	Oklahoma State	7.60 m (24 ft 11 in)	+0.4	
18	Saladin Nasser	Long Beach St.	7.48 m (24 ft 6 1/4 in)	+2.4	
19	JuVaughn Blake	LSU	7.48 m (24 ft 6 1/4 in)	+0.9	
20	Jason Smith	Long Beach St.	7.42 m (24 ft 4 in)	+0.4	
21	Marcus Flannigan	Grand Canyon	7.38 m (24 ft 2 1/2 in)	+1.4	
22	(United States Virgin Islands) Fred Dorsey	Kentucky	7.35 m (24 ft 1 1/4 in)	-0.4	
23	Carter Shell	Arkansas State	7.30 m (23 ft 11 1/4 in)	+0.3	
	Tyler Jones	Kennesaw State	FOUL		

==== Men's triple jump ====
Tahar Triki of Texas A&M University won the men's triple jump on June 8.

Rank	Athlete	Team	Distance	Wind	Notes
1st place, gold medalist(s)	(Algeria) Tahar Triki	Texas A&M	16.79 m (55 ft 1 in)	-0.7	
2nd place, silver medalist(s)	(Jamaica) Odaine Lewis	Texas Tech	16.73 m (54 ft 10 1/2 in)	+0.6	PB
3rd place, bronze medalist(s)	KeAndre Bates	Florida	16.63 m (54 ft 6 1/2 in)	+0.0	
4	Scotty Newton	TCU	16.47 m (54 ft 1/4 in)	-0.7	
5	(Zimbabwe) Chengetayi Mapaya	TCU	16.42 m (53 ft 10 1/4 in)	+0.5	PB
6	Christian Edwards	Alabama	16.37 m (53 ft 8 1/4 in)	+0.2	PB
7	Darius Armstead	Sacramento St.	16.17 m (53 ft 1/2 in)	-0.1	
8	(Jamaica) Clayton Brown	Florida	16.10 m (52 ft 9 3/4 in)	-0.5	
9	(The Bahamas) Kaiwan Culmer	Nebraska	16.09 m (52 ft 9 1/4 in)	+0.0	
10	(Jamaica) Jordan Scott	Virginia	15.96 m (52 ft 4 1/4 in)	-0.2	
11	Barden Adams	Kansas	15.90 m (52 ft 1 3/4 in)	-0.6	
12	(Zimbabwe) Brian Mada	DePaul	15.89 m (52 ft 1 1/2 in)	-0.2	PB
13	David Oluwadara	Boston U.	15.86 m (52 ft 1/4 in)	+0.1	
14	Papay Glaywulu	Oklahoma	15.86 m (52 ft 1/4 in)	+0.3	
15	John Warren	Southern Miss.	15.86 m (52 ft 1/4 in)	-0.9	
16	DaJuan Seward	Ohio State	15.75 m (51 ft 8 in)	-0.4	
17	Jeremiah Green	Clemson	15.71 m (51 ft 6 1/2 in)	+0.5	
18	(Finland) Tuomas Kaukolahti	California	15.53 m (50 ft 11 1/4 in)	-0.9	
19	Craig Stevens Jr	Kent State	15.36 m (50 ft 4 1/2 in)	-0.5	
20	Markel Dalton	Charlotte	15.14 m (49 ft 8 in)	-0.1	
21	Darrel Jones	Liberty	15.00 m (49 ft 2 1/2 in)	-0.2	
22	Zachary Johnson	Sam Houston St.	13.32 m (43 ft 8 1/4 in)	-0.8	
	(Jamaica) O'Brien Wasome	Texas	DNS		
	Armani Wallace	Florida State	FOUL		

==== Men's high jump ====
Kansas State University's Tejaswin Shankar won the men's high jump on June 8.

Rank	Athlete	Team	Height	Notes
1st place, gold medalist(s)	(India) Tejaswin Shankar	Kansas State	2.24 m (7 ft 4 in)	
2nd place, silver medalist(s)	Shelby McEwen	Alabama	2.21 m (7 ft 3 in)	
3rd place, bronze medalist(s)	Keenon Laine	Georgia	2.21 m (7 ft 3 in)	
4	Trey Culver	Texas Tech	2.21 m (7 ft 3 in)	
5	(Greece) Antonios Merlos	Georgia	2.18 m (7 ft 1 3/4 in)	PB
6	Vernon Turner	Oklahoma	2.18 m (7 ft 1 3/4 in)	
7	Earnie Sears	USC	2.18 m (7 ft 1 3/4 in)	
8	Jhonny Victor	Florida	2.18 m (7 ft 1 3/4 in)	
9	Landon Bartel	Nebraska	2.18 m (7 ft 1 3/4 in)	
10	(Jamaica) Clayton Brown	Florida	2.13 m (6 ft 11 3/4 in)	
10	(Jamaica) Damar Robinson	Louisville	2.13 m (6 ft 11 3/4 in)	
12	Samuel Shoultz	Maryland	2.13 m (6 ft 11 3/4 in)	
13	JuVaughn Blake	LSU	2.08 m (6 ft 9 3/4 in)	
13	Ty Anderson	UTSA	2.08 m (6 ft 9 3/4 in)	
13	Jonathan Wells	Illinois	2.08 m (6 ft 9 3/4 in)	
13	Zack Anderson	South Dakota	2.08 m (6 ft 9 3/4 in)	
13	Matthew Birzer	Notre Dame	2.08 m (6 ft 9 3/4 in)	
18	Ryan Lockard	Minnesota	2.08 m (6 ft 9 3/4 in)	
18	Ben Milligan	Oregon	2.08 m (6 ft 9 3/4 in)	
18	Brandon Piwinski	Michigan	2.08 m (6 ft 9 3/4 in)	
	Safir Scott	Connecticut	NH	
	Julian Harvey	SIU Edwardsville	NH	
	Bryant O'Georgia	Arizona	NH	
	Jerin Allen	Louisville	NH	

==== Men's pole vault ====
The University of South Dakota's Chris Nilsen set an NCAA championship record of 5.83 m (19 ft 1 1/2 in) to win the men's pole vault, which took place on June 6.

Rank	Name	University	Height	Notes
1st place, gold medalist(s)	Chris Nilsen	South Dakota	5.83 m (19 ft 1 1/2 in)	CR
2nd place, silver medalist(s)	Matthew Ludwig	Akron	5.55 m (18 ft 2 1/2 in)	
3rd place, bronze medalist(s)	(Germany) Torben Laidig	Virginia Tech	5.55 m (18 ft 2 1/2 in)	
4	Jacob Wooten	Texas A&M	5.55 m (18 ft 2 1/2 in)	PB
5	Tray Oates	Samford	5.45 m (17 ft 10 1/2 in)	
5	(Saudi Arabia) Hussain Al-Hizam	Kansas	5.45 m (17 ft 10 1/2 in)	
7	Deakin Volz	Virginia Tech	5.45 m (17 ft 10 1/2 in)	
8	(United Kingdom) Joel Benitez	Virginia Tech	5.45 m (17 ft 10 1/2 in)	PB
9	Adam Coulon	Indiana	5.45 m (17 ft 10 1/2 in)	PB
10	Marc Toney	UC Davis	5.45 m (17 ft 10 1/2 in)	PB
11	Nate Richartz	Notre Dame	5.30 m (17 ft 4 1/2 in)	
11	Sean Collins	South Alabama	5.30 m (17 ft 4 1/2 in)	
13	Drew Mcmichael	Texas Tech	5.30 m (17 ft 4 1/2 in)	
14	Audie Wyatt	Texas A&M	5.30 m (17 ft 4 1/2 in)	
15	Blake Scott	Oklahoma State	5.30 m (17 ft 4 1/2 in)	PB
16	Craig Hunter	Connecticut	5.30 m (17 ft 4 1/2 in)	
17	(Estonia) Sander Moldau	Washington St.	5.15 m (16 ft 10 3/4 in)	
17	Elijah Cole	Charlotte	5.15 m (16 ft 10 3/4 in)	
19	Clayton Fritsch	Sam Houston St.	5.15 m (16 ft 10 3/4 in)	
20	Scott Marshall	Grand Canyon	5.15 m (16 ft 10 3/4 in)	
	Nick Meyer	Kansas	NH	
	Cole Gorski	Ohio State	NH	
	Jake David	South Dakota	NH	
	Devin King	SE Louisiana	NH	

==== Men's shot put ====
After winning the men's hammer throw earlier in the day, the University of Georgia's Denzel Comenentia won the shot put on June 6 with a throw of 20.61 m (67 ft 7 1/4 in).

Rank	Athlete	Team	Distance	Notes
1st place, gold medalist(s)	(Netherlands) Denzel Comenentia	Georgia	20.61 m (67 ft 7 1/4 in)	
2nd place, silver medalist(s)	(Nigeria) Josh Awotunde	South Carolina	20.57 m (67 ft 5 3/4 in)	
3rd place, bronze medalist(s)	(Egypt) Mostafa Hassan	Colorado St.	20.44 m (67 ft 1/2 in)	
4	Adrian Piperi	Texas	20.41 m (66 ft 11 1/2 in)	PB
5	Jordan Geist	Arizona	20.32 m (66 ft 8 in)	
6	(Nigeria) Oghenakpobo Efekoro	Virginia	20.28 m (66 ft 6 1/4 in)	
7	Austin Droogsma	Florida State	20.23 m (66 ft 4 1/4 in)	
8	Nicholas Demaline	Ohio State	20.18 m (66 ft 2 1/4 in)	PB
9	Jared Kern	Southern Illinois	19.95 m (65 ft 5 1/4 in)	
10	Payton Otterdahl	North Dakota State	19.62 m (64 ft 4 1/4 in)	
11	Grant Cartwright	Michigan	19.61 m (64 ft 4 in)	PB
12	Jordan West	Tennessee	19.43 m (63 ft 8 3/4 in)	
13	Kord Ferguson	Alabama	19.39 m (63 ft 7 1/4 in)	
14	Andrew Liskowitz	Michigan	19.19 m (62 ft 11 1/2 in)	
15	Nicholas Ponzio	USC	19.01 m (62 ft 4 1/4 in)	
16	(Hungary) Peter Simon	California	18.95 m (62 ft 2 in)	
17	McKay Johnson	California	18.92 m (62 ft 3/4 in)	
18	T'Mond Johnson	Texas State	18.91 m (62 ft 1/4 in)	
19	Noah Castle	Kentucky	18.91 m (62 ft 1/4 in)	
20	Nikolas Huffman	Kentucky	18.54 m (60 ft 9 3/4 in)	
21	Brett Neelly	Kansas State	18.04 m (59 ft 2 in)	
22	(Israel) Itamar Levi	Arkansas State	17.92 m (58 ft 9 1/2 in)	
23	Reno Tuufuli	Iowa	17.89 m (58 ft 8 1/4 in)	
	Cedric Paul	Northwestern St.	FOUL	

==== Men's discus throw ====
Luke Vaughn of Memphis University won the men's discus throw on June 8.

Rank	Athlete	Team	Mark	Notes
1st place, gold medalist(s)	Luke Vaughn	Memphis	60.41 m (198 ft 2 in)	
2nd place, silver medalist(s)	(United Kingdom) Greg Thompson	Maryland	58.96 m (193 ft 5 in)	
3rd place, bronze medalist(s)	Brian Williams	Ole Miss	58.62 m (192 ft 3 in)	
4	Kord Ferguson	Alabama	58.42 m (191 ft 8 in)	
5	Reno Tuufuli	Iowa	57.61 m (189 ft 0 in)	
6	Ashmon Lucas	Purdue	56.88 m (186 ft 7 in)	
7	David Lucas	Penn State	56.87 m (186 ft 6 in)	
8	(United Kingdom) Nicholas Percy	Nebraska	56.72 m (186 ft 1 in)	
9	Eric Kicinski	Texas Tech	56.55 m (185 ft 6 in)	
10	Payton Otterdahl	North Dakota State	55.48 m (182 ft 0 in)	
11	Daniel Haugh	Alabama	55.27 m (181 ft 3 in)	
12	Jordan Geist	Arizona	54.95 m (180 ft 3 in)	
13	George Evans	Kansas	54.41 m (178 ft 6 in)	
14	(Moldova) Nicolai Ceban	Kansas	54.26 m (178 ft 0 in)	
15	(Germany) Rafael Vallery	Memphis	53.98 m (177 ft 1 in)	
16	Noah Castle	Kentucky	53.95 m (177 ft 0 in)	
17	Kyle Douglass	Montana State	53.91 m (176 ft 10 in)	
18	McKay Johnson	California	53.43 m (175 ft 3 in)	
19	Turner Washington	Arizona	53.36 m (175 ft 0 in)	
20	(Italy) Gian Ragonesi	Miami	52.77 m (173 ft 1 in)	
21	Cullen Prena	Ole Miss	51.47 m (168 ft 10 in)	
22	(Slovenia) Irenej Bozovicar	Manhattan	51.46 m (168 ft 9 in)	
23	Carlos Davis	Nebraska	49.10 m (161 ft 1 in)	
	Ben Hammer	South Dakota	FOUL	

==== Men's javelin throw ====
Mississippi State University's Anderson Peters set a championship record of 82.82 m (271 ft 8 in) to win the men's javelin throw on June 6.

Rank	Name	Team	Distance	Notes
1st place, gold medalist(s)	(Grenada) Anderson Peters	Miss State	82.82 m (271 ft 8 in)	PB CR
2nd place, silver medalist(s)	(Spain) Nicolas Quijera	Miss State	80.21 m (263 ft 1 in)	PB
3rd place, bronze medalist(s)	(Iceland) Sindri Guðmundsson	Utah State	76.37 m (250 ft 6 in)	
4	Trevor Danielson	Stanford	71.80 m (235 ft 6 in)	PB
5	(Australia) Michael Criticos	Memphis	71.25 m (233 ft 9 in)	
6	Elijah Marta	Kentucky	70.81 m (232 ft 3 in)	PB
7	(Paraguay) Fabian Dohmann	Texas	70.58 m (231 ft 6 in)	
8	Aaron True	Wichita State	70.26 m (230 ft 6 in)	
9	Jesse Newman	Grand Canyon	69.81 m (229 ft 0 in)	PB
10	Jonno Engelking	SE Missouri	68.07 m (223 ft 3 in)	
11	(Germany) Marian Spannowsky	UCLA	68.05 m (223 ft 3 in)	
12	(Saint Kitts and Nevis) Adrian Williams	SE Louisiana	68.01 m (223 ft 1 in)	
13	William Petersson	Texas A&M	67.33 m (220 ft 10 in)	
14	(Sweden) Simon Litzell	UCLA	66.72 m (218 ft 10 in)	
15	Michael Biddle	Penn State	66.52 m (218 ft 2 in)	
16	Tony White	UMBC	65.71 m (215 ft 7 in)	
17	(The Bahamas) Denzel Pratt	Liberty	65.19 m (213 ft 10 in)	
18	John Nizich	Oregon	64.30 m (210 ft 11 in)	
19	Richard Vinson	SE Missouri	63.58 m (208 ft 7 in)	
20	Damien Odle	Wichita State	63.47 m (208 ft 2 in)	
21	(Spain) Rodrigo Iglesias	Akron	63.23 m (207 ft 5 in)	
22	Sean Richards	Navy	61.35 m (201 ft 3 in)	
23	August Cook	Army	61.10 m (200 ft 5 in)	
24	Cade Antonucci	Auburn	59.30 m (194 ft 6 in)	

==== Men's hammer throw ====
The men's hammer throw took place on June 6. University of Georgia junior Denzel Comenentia set a personal best to win his first NCAA championship.

Rank	Athlete	Team	Best mark	Notes
1st place, gold medalist(s)	(Netherlands) Denzel Comenentia	Georgia	76.41 m (250 ft 8 in)	PB
2nd place, silver medalist(s)	(Sweden) Anders Eriksson	Florida	73.76 m (241 ft 11 in)	
3rd place, bronze medalist(s)	(United Kingdom) Jake Norris	LSU	73.24 m (240 ft 3 in)	PB
4	Rudy Winkler	Rutgers	72.74 m (238 ft 7 in)	
5	Daniel Haugh	Alabama	72.72 m (238 ft 6 in)	
6	Morgan Shigo	Penn State	72.47 m (237 ft 9 in)	PB
7	(Norway) Thomas Mardal	Florida	72.20 m (236 ft 10 in)	PB
8	AJ Mcfarland	Florida	71.29 m (233 ft 10 in)	PB
9	Adam Kelly	Princeton	70.27 m (230 ft 6 in)	
10	(Spain) Kevin Arreaga	Miami	70.07 m (229 ft 10 in)	
11	(Iceland) Hilmar Orn Jonsson	Virginia	69.94 m (229 ft 5 in)	
12	(Belarus) Gleb Dudarev	Kansas	69.18 m (226 ft 11 in)	
13	Michael Shanahan	New Hampshire	69.16 m (226 ft 10 in)	
14	Brock Eager	Washington St.	67.97 m (222 ft 11 in)	
15	(Spain) Cristian Ravar Ladislau	Arkansas State	67.75 m (222 ft 3 in)	
16	Silviu Bocancea	California	65.54 m (215 ft 0 in)	
17	Justin Stafford	UCLA	64.25 m (210 ft 9 in)	
18	Mitch Dixon	Kansas State	64.17 m (210 ft 6 in)	
19	Joshua Hernandez	Sam Houston St.	63.46 m (208 ft 2 in)	
20	Ricky Hurley	Southern Illinois	63.07 m (206 ft 11 in)	
21	Kieran Mckeag	Minnesota	62.45 m (204 ft 10 in)	
22	Avery Carter	Missouri	62.21 m (204 ft 1 in)	
23	(United Kingdom) Nicholas Percy	Nebraska	61.70 m (202 ft 5 in)	
24	Jacob Mcbride	North Dakota State	60.75 m (199 ft 3 in)	

==== Decathlon ====
The men's decathlon began on June 6. Only 18 of the 24 competitors completed the event. British athlete Tim Duckworth of the University of Kentucky led the field by a wide margin after the first five events on June 6, and continued to perform well in the remaining events before sustaining an injury on June 7. He remained in competition despite the injury, and due to his prior lead was able to win the overall points table despite finishing last place in the final 1500 m event.

Rank	Athlete	Team	Overall points	100 m	LJ	SP	HJ	400 m	110 m H	DT	PV	JT	1500 m
1st place, gold medalist(s)	(United Kingdom) Tim Duckworth	Kentucky	8336	959; 10.57	1063; 8.01 m (26 ft 3 1/4 in)	676; 13.15 m (43 ft 1 1/2 in)	925; 2.13 m (6 ft 11 3/4 in)	872; 48.78	927; 14.37	721; 42.76 m (140 ft 3 in)	944; 5.11 m (16 ft 9 in)	697; 57.27 m (187 ft 10 in)	552; 5:01.27
2nd place, silver medalist(s)	(Estonia) Karl Saluri	Georgia	8137	975; 10.50	985; 7.70 m (25 ft 3 in)	753; 14.41 m (47 ft 3 1/4 in)	653; 1.83 m (6 ft 0 in)	902; 48.14	820; 15.25	725; 42.95 m (140 ft 10 in)	852; 4.81 m (15 ft 9 1/4 in)	691; 56.91 m (186 ft 8 in)	781; 4:24.49
3rd place, bronze medalist(s)	(Estonia) Johannes Erm	Georgia	8046	892; 10.86	1056; 7.98 m (26 ft 2 in)	695; 13.46 m (44 ft 1 3/4 in)	785; 1.98 m (6 ft 5 3/4 in)	893; 48.34	864; 14.88	751; 44.21 m (145 ft 0 in)	852; 4.81 m (15 ft 9 1/4 in)	666; 55.21 m (181 ft 1 in)	592; 4:54.46
4	Joe Delgado	Louisville	7852	888; 10.88	862; 7.20 m (23 ft 7 1/4 in)	715; 13.79 m (45 ft 2 3/4 in)	758; 1.95 m (6 ft 4 3/4 in)	889; 48.41	834; 15.13	669; 40.20 m (131 ft 10 in)	793; 4.61 m (15 ft 1 1/4 in)	648; 54.01 m (177 ft 2 in)	796; 4:22.36
5	Scott Filip	Rice	7803	938; 10.66	1005; 7.78 m (25 ft 6 1/4 in)	667; 12.99 m (42 ft 7 1/4 in)	813; 2.01 m (6 ft 7 in)	855; 49.13	829; 15.17	621; 37.84 m (124 ft 1 in)	734; 4.41 m (14 ft 5 1/2 in)	644; 53.71 m (176 ft 2 in)	697; 4:37.35
6	Tim Ehrhardt	Michigan State	7736	890; 10.87	918; 7.43 m (24 ft 4 1/2 in)	651; 12.73 m (41 ft 9 in)	813; 2.01 m (6 ft 7 in)	913; 47.92	744; 15.90	536; 33.61 m (110 ft 3 in)	913; 5.01 m (16 ft 5 in)	596; 50.49 m (165 ft 7 in)	762; 4:27.35
7	Markus Ballengee	Liberty	7722	808; 11.24	720; 6.60 m (21 ft 7 3/4 in)	682; 13.24 m (43 ft 5 1/4 in)	813; 2.01 m (6 ft 7 in)	828; 49.72	884; 14.72	736; 43.48 m (142 ft 7 in)	852; 4.81 m (15 ft 9 1/4 in)	656; 54.56 m (179 ft 0 in)	743; 4:30.17
8	Kevin Nielsen	BYU	7695	876; 10.93	915; 7.42 m (24 ft 4 in)	652; 12.75 m (41 ft 9 3/4 in)	813; 2.01 m (6 ft 7 in)	847; 49.30	836; 15.11	612; 37.41 m (122 ft 8 in)	793; 4.61 m (15 ft 1 1/4 in)	598; 50.63 m (166 ft 1 in)	753; 4:28.70
9	Gabe Moore	Arkansas	7670	856; 11.02	828; 7.06 m (23 ft 1 3/4 in)	731; 14.05 m (46 ft 1 in)	731; 1.92 m (6 ft 3 1/2 in)	837; 49.51	867; 14.86	787; 45.97 m (150 ft 9 in)	763; 4.51 m (14 ft 9 1/2 in)	697; 57.25 m (187 ft 9 in)	573; 4:57.73
10	Nick Guerrant	Michigan State	7619	883; 10.90	852; 7.16 m (23 ft 5 3/4 in)	640; 12.56 m (41 ft 2 1/4 in)	785; 1.98 m (6 ft 5 3/4 in)	830; 49.67	836; 15.11	732; 43.29 m (142 ft 0 in)	734; 4.41 m (14 ft 5 1/2 in)	670; 55.48 m (182 ft 0 in)	657; 4:43.80
11	Trent Nytes	Wisconsin	7609	854; 11.03	905; 7.38 m (24 ft 2 1/2 in)	687; 13.33 m (43 ft 8 3/4 in)	840; 2.04 m (6 ft 8 1/4 in)	845; 49.34	817; 15.27	686; 41.04 m (134 ft 7 in)	648; 4.11 m (13 ft 5 3/4 in)	683; 56.37 m (184 ft 11 in)	644; 4:45.87
12	(Jamaica) Adrian Riley	UTSA	7520	901; 10.82	1038; 7.91 m (25 ft 11 1/4 in)	625; 12.30 m (40 ft 4 1/4 in)	758; 1.95 m (6 ft 4 3/4 in)	764; 51.12	789; 15.51	720; 42.70 m (140 ft 1 in)	676; 4.21 m (13 ft 9 1/2 in)	645; 53.81 m (176 ft 6 in)	604; 4:52.51
13	William Dougherty	Iowa	7467	856; 11.02	788; 6.89 m (22 ft 7 1/4 in)	748; 14.32 m (46 ft 11 3/4 in)	731; 1.92 m (6 ft 3 1/2 in)	826; 49.76	841; 15.07	613; 37.47 m (122 ft 11 in)	763; 4.51 m (14 ft 9 1/2 in)	591; 50.17 m (164 ft 7 in)	710; 4:35.31
14	(New Zealand) Aaron Booth	Kansas State	7458	832; 11.13	833; 7.08 m (23 ft 2 1/2 in)	664; 12.95 m (42 ft 5 3/4 in)	731; 1.92 m (6 ft 3 1/2 in)	768; 51.02	750; 15.85	711; 42.28 m (138 ft 8 in)	763; 4.51 m (14 ft 9 1/2 in)	701; 57.55 m (188 ft 9 in)	705; 4:36.04
15	Benjamin Ose	Dartmouth	7237	858; 11.01	804; 6.96 m (22 ft 10 in)	592; 11.77 m (38 ft 7 1/4 in)	627; 1.80 m (5 ft 10 3/4 in)	797; 50.39	776; 15.62	633; 38.43 m (126 ft 0 in)	822; 4.71 m (15 ft 5 1/4 in)	624; 52.38 m (171 ft 10 in)	704; 4:36.32
16	Derek Jacobus	Arkansas	7236	876; 10.93	900; 7.36 m (24 ft 1 3/4 in)	681; 13.22 m (43 ft 4 1/4 in)	705; 1.89 m (6 ft 2 1/4 in)	848; 49.29	705; 16.25	592; 36.43 m (119 ft 6 in)	734; 4.41 m (14 ft 5 1/2 in)	543; 46.90 m (153 ft 10 in)	652; 4:44.61
17	Sawyer Smith	Wisconsin	6583	888; 10.88	881; 7.28 m (23 ft 10 1/2 in)	737; 14.14 m (46 ft 4 1/2 in)	705; 1.89 m (6 ft 2 1/4 in)	793; 50.47	728; 16.04	708; 42.15 m (138 ft 3 in)	734; 4.41 m (14 ft 5 1/2 in)	409; 37.70 m (123 ft 8 in)	0 DNF
18	Nathan Hite	Texas A&M	6518	863; 10.99	628; 6.19 m (20 ft 3 1/2 in)	719; 13.85 m (45 ft 5 1/4 in)	679; 1.86 m (6 ft 1 in)	835; 49.57	775; 15.63	667; 40.14 m (131 ft 8 in)	763; 4.51 m (14 ft 9 1/2 in)	589; 50.05 m (164 ft 2 in)	0 DNF
DNF	Harrison Williams	Stanford	--	945; 10.63	975; 7.66 m (25 ft 1 1/2 in)	724; 13.93 m (45 ft 8 1/4 in)	758; 1.95 m (6 ft 4 3/4 in)	909; 48.01	0 DQ	646; 39.10 m (128 ft 3 in)	0 DNS	0 DNS	0 DNS
DNF	TJ Lawson	Kent State	--	870; 10.96	838; 7.10 m (23 ft 3 1/2 in)	726; 13.96 m (45 ft 9 1/2 in)	758; 1.95 m (6 ft 4 3/4 in)	773; 50.92	0 DNS	0 DNS	0 DNS	0 DNS	0 DNS
DNF	Rauno Liitmae	Missouri	--	778; 11.38	713; 6.57 m (21 ft 6 1/2 in)	714; 13.77 m (45 ft 2 in)	679; 1.86 m (6 ft 1 in)	738; 51.70	0 DNS	0 DNS	0 DNS	0 DNS	0 DNS
DNF	Steele Wasik	Texas	--	852; 11.04	797; 6.93 m (22 ft 8 3/4 in)	676; 13.14 m (43 ft 1 1/4 in)	705; 1.89 m (6 ft 2 1/4 in)	0 DNS	0 DNS	0 DNS	0 DNS	0 DNS	0 DNS
DNF	(Canada) Nathaniel Mechler	Houston	--	899; 10.83	920; 7.44 m (24 ft 4 3/4 in)	613; 12.11 m (39 ft 8 3/4 in)	0 NH	0 DNS	0 DNS	0 DNS	0 DNS	0 DNS	0 DNS
DNF	Hunter Veith	Wichita State	--	870; 10.96	838; 7.10 m (23 ft 3 1/2 in)	636; 12.48 m (40 ft 11 1/4 in)	0 DNS	0 DNS	0 DNS	0 DNS	0 DNS	0 DNS	0 DNS

=== Women's events ===
==== Women's 100 meters ====
Coming off a 10.91 time in the prelims that was the fourth-best mark in NCAA history, Aleia Hobbs of Louisiana State University was favored to win the women's 100 m on June 9. Heavy rain prevented her from besting that time as she won the event by more than 0.2 seconds, and Hobbs said after the race that the rain was so pervasive that she could not see the track while she was running.

Wind: -0.7 m/s

Rank	Athlete	Team	Time	Notes
1st place, gold medalist(s)	Aleia Hobbs	LSU	11.01	
2nd place, silver medalist(s)	(Jamaica) Natalliah Whyte	Auburn	11.24	
3rd place, bronze medalist(s)	Twanisha Terry	USC	11.39	
4	(Jamaica) Jonielle Smith	Auburn	11.40	
5	Shania Collins	Tennessee	11.41	
6	Mikiah Brisco	LSU	11.44	
7	Deanna Hill	USC	11.45	
8	Ariana Washington	Oregon	11.50	

==== Women's 200 meters ====
The women's 200 m took place on June 9. Harvard University's Gabby Thomas, the indoor collegiate record holder in this event, faced Lynna Irby of Georgia University, a freshman who had set the meet record in the 400 m. Facing a strong headwind, both of the favorites took the lead at the start but were slowed substantially on the home stretch as the University of Southern California's Angelerne Annelus passed them both from lane 8, the widest lane, to win the race in 22.76 seconds. After the race, Annelus said she was in shock because she had not even been expected to make the final.

Wind: -2.3 m/s

Rank	Athlete	Team	Time	Notes
1st place, gold medalist(s)	Anglerne Annelus	USC	22.76	
2nd place, silver medalist(s)	Gabby Thomas	Harvard	22.86	
3rd place, bronze medalist(s)	Lynna Irby	Georgia	22.92	
4	Ka'Tia Seymour	Florida State	23.10	
5	Kortnei Johnson	LSU	23.20	
6	Ashley Henderson	San Diego State	23.34	
7	Deanna Hill	USC	23.53	
8	Shania Collins	Tennessee	24.01	

==== Women's 400 meters ====
University of Georgia freshman Lynna Irby won the women's 400 m in a new meet-record time of 49.80 seconds on June 9. The time was the number-two NCAA performance of all time in this event.

Rank	Athlete	Team	Time	Notes
1st place, gold medalist(s)	Lynna Irby	Georgia	49.80	PB, MR
2nd place, silver medalist(s)	Kendall Ellis	USC	50.19	
3rd place, bronze medalist(s)	Brionna Thomas	Purdue	50.78	PB
4	Sharrika Barnett	Florida	51.16	
5	Chloe Abbott	Purdue	51.87	
6	Briyahna Desrosiers	Oregon	52.10	
7	Rachel Misher	LSU	52.23	
8	Makenzie Dunmore	Oregon	1:49.13	

==== Women's 800 meters ====
Texas A&M University freshman and high school record-holder Sammy Watson won the women's 800 m on June 9. The race took place during intermittent heavy rain accounting for slower times, and Watson had to dive at the line exhausted to hold off Middle Tennessee State University's Abike Egbeniyi.

Rank	Athlete	Team	Time	Notes
1st place, gold medalist(s)	Sammy Watson	Texas A&M	2:04.21	
2nd place, silver medalist(s)	(Nigeria) Abike Egbeniyi	Middle Tennessee State	2:04.33	
3rd place, bronze medalist(s)	(Canada) Ashley Taylor	Northern Arizona	2:05.01	
4	(Republic of Ireland) Siofra Cleirigh Buttner	Villanova	2:05.73	
5	Olivia Baker	Stanford	2:06.18	
6	(Ghana) Martha Bissah	Norfolk State	2:06.79	
7	Sabrina Southerland	Oregon	2:06.99	
8	(Jamaica) Jazmine Fray	Texas A&M	2:07.34	

==== Women's 1500 meters ====
Rank	Name	University	Time	Notes
1st place, gold medalist(s)	(Australia) Jessica Hull	Oregon	4:08.75	PB
2nd place, silver medalist(s)	Nikki Hiltz	Arkansas	4:09.14	PB
3rd place, bronze medalist(s)	Elise Cranny	Stanford	4:09.49	PB
4	Christina Aragon	Stanford	4:09.59	PB
5	Rachel Procratsky	Virginia Tech	4:10.84	
6	Taryn Rawlings	Portland	4:11.37	PB
7	Elinor Purrier	New Hampshire	4:11.56	
8	Danae Rivers	Penn State	4:12.36	
9	Grace Barnett	Clemson	4:13.01	
10	Dillon McClintock	Michigan State	4:15.29	
11	Janelle Noe	Toledo	4:20.37	
12	(Spain) Martina Rodriguez	Memphis	4:22.08	

==== Women's 5000 meters ====
Rank	Name	University	Time	Notes
1st place, gold medalist(s)	Karissa Schweizer	Missouri	15:41.58	
2nd place, silver medalist(s)	Allie Buchalski	Furman	15:42.77	
3rd place, bronze medalist(s)	(New Zealand) Lilli Burdon	Oregon	15:43.22	
4	Vanessa Fraser	Stanford	15:43.77	
5	(United Kingdom) Amy-Eloise Neale	Washington	15:44.41	
6	Ednah Kurgat	New Mexico	15:46.31	
7	Jessica Drop	Georgia	15:46.39	
8	Allie Ostrander	Boise State	15:46.50	
9	(Eritrea) Weini Kelati	New Mexico	15:46.57	
10	Erika Kemp	NC State	15:48.62	
11	(United Kingdom) Charlotte Taylor	San Francisco	15:49.70	
12	(Kenya) Sharon Lokedi	Kansas	15:51.29	
13	Erin Clark	Colorado	15:51.80	
14	(Canada) Nicole Hutchinson	Villanova	15:57.00	
15	Savannah Carnahan	Furman	15:57.42	
16	Elly Henes	NC State	15:57.69	
17	Samantha Nadel	Oregon	16:01.14	
18	Alicia Monson	Wisconsin	16:04.46	
19	Abbey Wheeler	Providence	16:06.69	
20	Rachel Dadamio	Notre Dame	16:07.39	PB
21	Katherine Receveur	Indiana	16:08.40	
22	Morgan Ilse	North Carolina	16:08.83	
23	Hannah Steelman	Wofford	16:09.63	PB
24	Bailey Davis	Louisville	16:36.04	

==== Women's 10,000 meters ====
The women's 10,000 m was held on June 7. Defending outdoor 5000 m and 2016 cross country champion Karissa Schweizer of the University of Missouri was favored by some to take the title in her first attempt at the distance at the championships, but she also faced the previous year's 10,000 m champion Charlotte Taylor from the University of San Francisco. A brisk pace set in part by Taylor put the athletes in reach of the NCAA meet record, and soon Schweizer, Taylor, Notre Dame's Anna Rohrer, University of Kansas junior Sharon Lokedi from Kenya, and former NCAA 3000m steeplechase runner-up Alice Wright, from the University of New Mexico, led the race at times alternating the lead. In the end, Lokedi pulled strongly away from the field in the final lap to win in a new championship record time of 32:09.20, followed by University of Louisville freshman Dorcas Wasike, who moved up the field in the final stages to take second. Lokedi had qualified for six NCAA track championship events before and never finished worse than sixth, but had never won an individual NCAA title before the race. Thanks to the fast pace, all of the first six athletes broke the old NCAA meet record, which had been set by Sylvia Mosqueda in 1988.

Rank	Athlete	Team	Time	Notes
1st place, gold medalist(s)	(Kenya) Sharon Lokedi	Kansas	32:09.20	PB CR
2nd place, silver medalist(s)	(Kenya) Dorcas Wasike	Louisville	32:11.81	PB
3rd place, bronze medalist(s)	Karissa Schweizer	Missouri	32:14.94	
4	(United Kingdom) Alice Wright	New Mexico	32:17.92	
5	(United Kingdom) Charlotte Taylor	San Francisco	32:17.95	
6	Anna Rohrer	Notre Dame	32:26.24	
7	Kaitlyn Benner	Colorado	33:13.38	
8	Jaci Smith	Air Force	33:14.00	
9	Erin Clark	Colorado	33:20.46	
10	(Poland) Weronika Pyzik	San Francisco	33:27.29	
11	Makena Morley	Colorado	33:28.66	
12	(Australia) Clare O'Brien	Boise State	33:34.18	
13	Margaret Allen	Indiana	33:48.94	PB
14	Caroline Alcorta	North Carolina	33:49.81	PB
15	Lauren Larocco	Portland	33:50.44	
16	Samantha Halvorsen	Wake Forest	33:52.69	PB
17	Annie Heffernan	Notre Dame	34:07.99	
18	Rachel Walny	Bowling Green	34:19.02	
19	Sara Freix	Virginia Tech	34:53.03	
20	Eden Meyer	North Florida	35:03.00	
21	Samantha Drop	Georgia	35:03.81	
22	Christine Frederick	Ohio State	35:23.61	
	(Bulgaria) Militsa Mircheva	Florida State	DNF	
	Alli Cash	Oregon	DNF	

==== Women's 100-meter hurdles ====
- Only top eight final results shown; no prelims are listed

Wind: +0.9 m/s

Rank	Name	University	Time	Notes
1st place, gold medalist(s)	(Puerto Rico) Jasmine Camacho-Quinn	Kentucky	12.70	
2nd place, silver medalist(s)	(The Bahamas) Devynne Charlton	Purdue	12.77	
3rd place, bronze medalist(s)	Cortney Jones	Florida State	13.04 (13.035)	
4	(The Bahamas) Pedrya Seymour	Texas	13.04 (13.037)	
5	(Jamaica) Janeek Brown	Arkansas	13.05	
6	Tonea Marshall	LSU	13.09	
7	Alaysha Johnson	Oregon	13.22	
8	(Jamaica) Rushelle Burton	Texas	13.51	

==== Women's 400-meter hurdles ====
- Only top eight final results shown; no prelims are listed

Rank	Name	University	Time	Notes
1st place, gold medalist(s)	Sydney McLaughlin	Kentucky	53.96	
2nd place, silver medalist(s)	Anna Cockrell	USC	55.71	SB
3rd place, bronze medalist(s)	Kymber Payne	LSU	56.88	
4	Symone Black	Purdue	57.22	
5	(Jamaica) Ranae McKenzie	Kansas State	57.67	
6	Nikki Stephens	Florida	57.80	
7	Emma Spagnola	Minnesota	58.61	
8	Ariel Jones	Texas	59.92	

==== Women's 3000-meter steeplechase ====
On June 9, Boise State University sophomore Allie Ostrander won the women's 3000 m steeplechase, defending her title from last year's race. She described her strategy as being "relaxed for the first couple of laps and then winding it up," helped by Syracuse University's Paige Stoner who also pushed the pace. She became the first NCAA Division I athlete to win back-to-back steeplechase titles as an underclassman, and the second two-time national champion in Boise State Broncos history.

Rank	Name	University	Time	Notes
1st place, gold medalist(s)	Allie Ostrander	Boise State	9:39.28	
2nd place, silver medalist(s)	(Canada) Charlotte Prouse	New Mexico	9:45.45	
3rd place, bronze medalist(s)	Paige Stoner	Syracuse	9:46.98	PB
4	Claire Borchers	Michigan	9:48.33	PB
5	Val Constien	Colorado	9:48.40	PB
6	Grayson Murphy	Utah	9:48.80	
7	Courtney Coppinger	Kansas	9:49.04	PB
8	Cierra Simmons	Utah State	9:49.33	PB
9	Sarah Scott	Oklahoma	9:56.17	PB
10	(Russia) Alsu Bogdanova	Eastern Michigan	9:59.29	
11	Devin Clark	Arkansas	10:03.70	
12	Katy Kunc	Kentucky	10:09.04	

==== Women's 4 x 100-meter relay ====
- Only top eight final results shown; no prelims are listed

Rank	University	Time	Notes
1st place, gold medalist(s)	LSU	42.25	
2nd place, silver medalist(s)	Oregon	43.06	
3rd place, bronze medalist(s)	USC	43.11	
4	Kentucky	43.49	
5	Auburn	43.76	
6	Alabama	44.05	
7	Texas A&M	44.26	
8	Florida State	44.30	

==== Women's 4 x 400-meter relay ====
- Only top eight final results shown; no prelims are listed

Rank	University	Time	Notes
1st place, gold medalist(s)	USC	3:27.06	SB
2nd place, silver medalist(s)	Purdue	3:27.13	
3rd place, bronze medalist(s)	Oregon	3:28.36	
4	Kentucky	3:30.52	
5	Florida	3:30.73	
6	LSU	3:32.08	
7	Ohio State	3:32.25	
8	Baylor	3:32.63	

==== Women's long jump ====
Former American record holder in the triple jump, Keturah Orji of the University of Georgia, won the women's long jump on June 7.

Rank	Athlete	Team	Distance	Wind	Notes
1st place, gold medalist(s)	Keturah Orji	Georgia	6.67 m (21 ft 10 1/2 in)	+1.2	
2nd place, silver medalist(s)	Darrielle McQueen	Florida	6.61 m (21 ft 8 in)	+1.5	
3rd place, bronze medalist(s)	(United Kingdom) Jahisha Thomas	Iowa	6.53 m (21 ft 5 in)	+0.5	
4	(France) Yanis David	Florida	6.51 m (21 ft 4 1/4 in)	-0.4	
5	Tara Davis	Georgia	6.48 m (21 ft 3 in)	+2.1	
6	Savannah Carson	Purdue	6.43 m (21 ft 1 in)	+3.0	
7	(France) Rougui Sow	South Carolina	6.42 m (21 ft 3/4 in)	+2.6	
8	Madisen Richards	USC	6.42 m (21 ft 3/4 in)	+2.0	PB
9	(Trinidad and Tobago) Tyra Gittens	Texas A&M	6.38 m (20 ft 11 in)	+0.6	
10	Dominique Bullock	Auburn	6.36 m (20 ft 10 1/4 in)	+2.3	
11	(Venezuela) Jhoanmy Luque	Iowa State	6.34 m (20 ft 9 1/2 in)	+0.1	
12	Rhesa Foster	Oregon	6.32 m (20 ft 8 3/4 in)	+3.0	
13	(Nigeria) Mercy Abire	Oral Roberts	6.27 m (20 ft 6 3/4 in)	-0.1	
14	Destiny Longmire	San Jose St.	6.23 m (20 ft 5 1/4 in)	-2.3	PB
15	Anna Keefer	North Carolina	6.17 m (20 ft 2 3/4 in)	+0.7	PB
16	Kate Hall	Georgia	6.14 m (20 ft 1 1/2 in)	+0.4	
17	Ja'la Henderson	Wyoming	6.12 m (20 ft 3/4 in)	-0.1	
18	Samiyah Samuels	Houston	6.09 m (19 ft 11 3/4 in)	+1.1	
19	Raynesha Lewis	Nebraska	6.07 m (19 ft 10 3/4 in)	+0.1	
20	(Germany) Helena McLeod	Northern Arizona	6.07 m (19 ft 10 3/4 in)	+1.5	PB
21	Keishorea Armstrong	Binghamton	6.02 m (19 ft 9 in)	+0.2	
22	Jewel Smith	Maryland	5.94 m (19 ft 5 3/4 in)	+1.6	
23	Gabby Collins	Western Michigan	5.88 m (19 ft 3 1/4 in)	+1.2	
24	LaTyria Jefferson	Kansas	5.71 m (18 ft 8 3/4 in)	-2.3	

==== Women's triple jump ====
Rank	Name	University	Distance	Wind	Notes
1st place, gold medalist(s)	Keturah Orji	Georgia	14.04 m (46 ft 3/4 in)	+1.1	
2nd place, silver medalist(s)	(France) Yanis David	Florida	13.95 m (45 ft 9 in)	+2.8	
3rd place, bronze medalist(s)	(France) Marie-Josee Ebwea-Bile	Kentucky	13.66 m (44 ft 9 3/4 in)	+1.6	
4	(Germany) Jessie Maduka	UCLA	13.65 m (44 ft 9 1/4 in)	+1.9	PB
5	(Hungary) Eszter Bajnok	Virginia Tech	13.42 m (44 ft 1/4 in)	+2.7	SB
6	(United Kingdom) Jahisha Thomas	Iowa	13.39 m (43 ft 11 in)	+1.2	
7	(Jamaica) Jehvania Whyte	Northern Illinois	13.36 m (43 ft 9 3/4 in)	+3.4	
8	Darrielle McQueen	Florida	13.31 m (43 ft 8 in)	+2.6	
9	Kelly McKee	Virginia	13.23 m (43 ft 4 3/4 in)	+2.3	
10	Chaquinn Cook	Oregon	13.21 m (43 ft 4 in)	+1.3	
11	Lajarvia Brown	Texas A&M	13.19 m (43 ft 3 1/4 in)	-1.8	
12	Cidaea' Woods	Tennessee	13.15 m (43 ft 1 1/2 in)	+1.0	
13	(Venezuela) Jhoanmy Luque	Iowa State	13.10 m (42 ft 11 1/2 in)	+1.8	
14	Ciynamon Stevenson	Texas A&M	13.02 m (42 ft 8 1/2 in)	+0.8	
15	Ja'la Henderson	Wyoming	13.01 m (42 ft 8 in)	+2.2	
16	Sabina Allen	Campbell	12.99 m (42 ft 7 1/4 in)	-0.7	
17	Michelle Fokam	Rice	12.97 m (42 ft 6 1/2 in)	+2.1	
18	(Jamaica) Shardia Lawrence	Kansas State	12.93 m (42 ft 5 in)	+1.6	
19	(Greece) Konstantina Romaiou	Kansas State	12.91 m (42 ft 4 1/4 in)	+2.9	
20	Jaimie Robinson	Alabama	12.87 m (42 ft 2 1/2 in)	+2.8	
21	Ashley Anderson	California	12.86 m (42 ft 2 1/4 in)	+1.3	
22	(United Kingdom) Simi Fajemisin	Harvard	12.52 m (41 ft 3/4 in)	+1.6	
23	(Jamaica) Tamara Moncrieffe	Alabama	12.49 m (40 ft 11 1/2 in)	+1.6	
-	Anisa Toppin	North Carolina A&T	DNS		

==== Women's high jump ====
Rank	Name	University	Height	Notes
1st place, gold medalist(s)	Alexus Henry	UT-Arlington	1.82 m (5 ft 11 1/2 in)	
2nd place, silver medalist(s)	Erinn Beattie	UC Davis	1.82 m (5 ft 11 1/2 in)	
2nd place, silver medalist(s)	Loretta Blaut	Cincinnati	1.82 m (5 ft 11 1/2 in)	
4	Shelley Spires	Air Force	1.78 m (5 ft 10 in)	
4	Megan McCloskey	Penn State	1.78 m (5 ft 10 in)	
6	Zarriea Willis	Texas Tech	1.78 m (5 ft 10 in)	
7	(Greece) Tatiana Gusin	Georgia	1.78 m (5 ft 10 in)	
8	Andrea Stapleton	BYU	1.78 m (5 ft 10 in)	
8	Stephanie Ahrens	Nebraska-Omaha	1.78 m (5 ft 10 in)	
10	Ellen Ekholm	Kentucky	1.78 m (5 ft 10 in)	
10	Regan Lewis	Ball State	1.78 m (5 ft 10 in)	
12	LaTyria Jefferson	Kansas	1.73 m (5 ft 8 in)	
12	(Seychelles) Lissa Labiche	South Carolina	1.73 m (5 ft 8 in)	
12	Ashley Ramacher	Minnesota	1.73 m (5 ft 8 in)	
12	Carly Paul	Brown	1.73 m (5 ft 8 in)	
12	(Finland) Heta Tuuri	Minnesota	1.73 m (5 ft 8 in)	
17	Cyre Virgo	Texas Tech	1.73 m (5 ft 8 in)	
18	Lily Lowe	Hawaii	1.73 m (5 ft 8 in)	
	(Canada) Dallyssa Huggins	Maryland	NH	
	Clarissa Cutliff	FIU	NH	
	Janae Moffitt	Purdue	NH	
	Kaitlyn Walker	LSU	NH	
	Anna Peyton Malizia	Penn	NH	
	Lyndsey Lopes	USC	NH	

==== Women's pole vault ====
University of Kentucky junior Olivia Gruver won the women's pole vault on June 7 in a personal best mark of 4.55 m (14 ft 11 in).

Rank	Athlete	Team	Height	Notes
1st place, gold medalist(s)	Olivia Gruver	Kentucky	4.55 m (14 ft 11 in)	PB
2nd place, silver medalist(s)	Alexis Jacobus	Arkansas	4.50 m (14 ft 9 in)	
3rd place, bronze medalist(s)	(Sweden) Lisa Gunnarsson	Virginia Tech	4.40 m (14 ft 5 in)	
4	Rachel Baxter	Virginia Tech	4.30 m (14 ft 1 1/4 in)	
4	Bridget Guy	Virginia	4.30 m (14 ft 1 1/4 in)	
6	(United Kingdom) Lucy Bryan	Akron	4.30 m (14 ft 1 1/4 in)	
7	Taylor Amann	Wisconsin	4.30 m (14 ft 1 1/4 in)	
8	Maddie Gardner	West Virginia	4.30 m (14 ft 1 1/4 in)	
9	Kally Long	Texas	4.30 m (14 ft 1 1/4 in)	
9	(Italy) Helen Falda	South Dakota	4.30 m (14 ft 1 1/4 in)	PB
11	Lauren Martinez	California	4.30 m (14 ft 1 1/4 in)	PB
12	Kristen Denk	Vanderbilt	4.15 m (13 ft 7 1/4 in)	
12	Victoria Hoggard	Arkansas	4.15 m (13 ft 7 1/4 in)	
12	Erika Malaspina	Stanford	4.15 m (13 ft 7 1/4 in)	
15	Laura Marty	Duke	4.15 m (13 ft 7 1/4 in)	
16	Gabriela Leon	Louisville	4.15 m (13 ft 7 1/4 in)	
16	Lindsey Murray	Ole Miss	4.15 m (13 ft 7 1/4 in)	
18	Sophia Franklin	Michigan State	4.00 m (13 ft 1 1/4 in)	
18	Britainy Smith	Alabama	4.00 m (13 ft 1 1/4 in)	
18	Andrea Willis	Kansas	4.00 m (13 ft 1 1/4 in)	
21	Kathryn Tomczak	Air Force	4.00 m (13 ft 1 1/4 in)	
	Hannah McWilliams	Texas A&M-CC	NH	
	Kaitlyn Merritt	Stanford	NH	
	Rylee Robinson	Arkansas	NH	

==== Women's shot put ====
Multiple-time collegiate record holder Maggie Ewen of Arizona State University won the women's shot put on June 7.

Rank	Athlete	Team	Distance	Notes
1st place, gold medalist(s)	Maggie Ewen	Arizona State	19.17 m (62 ft 10 1/2 in)	
2nd place, silver medalist(s)	Jessica Woodard	Oklahoma	18.68 m (61 ft 3 1/4 in)	PB
3rd place, bronze medalist(s)	Lena Giger	Stanford	17.59 m (57 ft 8 1/2 in)	
4	Laulauga Tausaga	Iowa	17.34 m (56 ft 10 1/2 in)	PB
5	Janeah Stewart	Ole Miss	17.34 m (56 ft 10 1/2 in)	
6	Alyssa Wilson	UCLA	17.21 m (56 ft 5 1/2 in)	PB
7	Samantha Noennig	Arizona State	17.12 m (56 ft 2 in)	
8	Lloydricia Cameron	Florida	17.07 m (56 ft 0 in)	
9	(Trinidad and Tobago) Portious Warren	Alabama	16.92 m (55 ft 6 in)	
10	Galissia Cause	East Carolina	16.72 m (54 ft 10 1/4 in)	
11	(Jamaica) Gleneve Grange	Florida State	16.70 m (54 ft 9 1/4 in)	
12	(United Kingdom) Divine Oladipo	Connecticut	16.55 m (54 ft 3 1/2 in)	
13	Meia Gordon	Oklahoma	16.51 m (54 ft 2 in)	
14	(Netherlands Antilles) Jess St. John	Kansas State	16.48 m (54 ft 3/4 in)	
15	Aliyah Gustafson	Bowling Green	16.47 m (54 ft 1/4 in)	
16	Tochi Nlemchi	SMU	16.18 m (53 ft 1 in)	
17	(Lithuania) Ieva Zarankaite	Florida State	16.09 m (52 ft 9 1/4 in)	
18	Kiley Sabin	Minnesota	15.95 m (52 ft 3 3/4 in)	
19	Banke Oginni	Wisconsin	15.90 m (52 ft 1 3/4 in)	
20	Katelyn Daniels	Michigan State	15.52 m (50 ft 11 in)	
21	Tori McKinley	Auburn	15.33 m (50 ft 3 1/2 in)	
22	Alexis Chiles	Southern Miss.	15.11 m (49 ft 6 3/4 in)	
23	Brenn Flint	Utah State	13.72 m (45 ft 0 in)	
	Lauren Evans	North Carolina St.	FOUL	

==== Women's discus throw ====
Rank	Name	University	Distance	Notes
1st place, gold medalist(s)	Maggie Ewen	Arizona State	60.48 m (198 ft 5 in)	
2nd place, silver medalist(s)	(Jamaica) Shadae Lawrence	Kansas State	59.68 m (195 ft 9 in)	
3rd place, bronze medalist(s)	Valarie Allman	Stanford	59.20 m (194 ft 2 in)	
4	Laulauga Tausaga	Iowa	56.07 m (183 ft 11 in)	
5	Gabi Jacobs	Missouri	55.47 m (181 ft 11 in)	
6	Calea Carr	Arkansas State	54.67 m (179 ft 4 in)	PB
7	Obiageri Amaechi	Princeton	54.16 m (177 ft 8 in)	
8	Katelyn Daniels	Michigan State	53.84 m (176 ft 7 in)	
9	(Lithuania) Ieva Zarankaite	Florida State	53.80 m (176 ft 6 in)	
10	Micaela Hazlewood	Purdue	52.87 m (173 ft 5 in)	
11	(Canada) Agnes Esser	Minnesota	52.23 m (171 ft 4 in)	
12	(Moldova) Alexandra Emilianov	Kansas	51.30 m (168 ft 3 in)	
13	(The Bahamas) Serena Brown	Texas A&M	50.48 m (165 ft 7 in)	
14	(Jamaica) Shanice Love	Florida State	50.43 m (165 ft 5 in)	
15	Elena Bruckner	Texas	50.19 m (164 ft 7 in)	
16	Debbie Ajagbe	Miami	49.99 m (164 ft 0 in)	
17	Lloydricia Cameron	Florida	47.90 m (157 ft 1 in)	
18	(United Kingdom) Divine Oladipo	Connecticut	46.09 m (151 ft 2 in)	
19	(Trinidad and Tobago) Portious Warren	Alabama	45.08 m (147 ft 10 in)	
20	Abigale Wilson	Akron	41.13 m (134 ft 11 in)	
21	Ashley Anumba	Penn	33.21 m (108 ft 11 in)	
	Alyssa Wilson	UCLA	FOUL	
	Claudia Ababio	Maryland	FOUL	
	Jessica Woodard	Oklahoma	FOUL	

==== Women's javelin throw ====
Australian athlete Mackenzie Little won the women's javelin throw on June 7 representing Stanford University.

Rank	Athlete	Team	Distance	Notes
1st place, gold medalist(s)	(Australia) Mackenzie Little	Stanford	60.36 m (198 ft 0 in)	PB
2nd place, silver medalist(s)	Jenna Gray	Stanford	57.29 m (187 ft 11 in)	PB
3rd place, bronze medalist(s)	(Paraguay) Laura Paredes	Florida State	55.17 m (181 ft 0 in)	PB
4	(Nigeria) Kelechi Nwanaga	UMBC	55.02 m (180 ft 6 in)	PB
5	Alyssa Olin	North Dakota State	55.02 m (180 ft 6 in)	
6	Avione Allgood	Florida	53.93 m (176 ft 11 in)	
7	(Canada) Ashley Pryke	Memphis	53.85 m (176 ft 8 in)	
8	Kristen Clark	Texas A&M	52.83 m (173 ft 3 in)	
9	Destiny Dawson	Oregon State	52.14 m (171 ft 0 in)	PB
10	Kylee Carter	Auburn	51.20 m (167 ft 11 in)	
11	Ashton Riner	BYU	50.25 m (164 ft 10 in)	
12	(Bosnia and Herzegovina) Vanja Spaic	Fresno State	50.19 m (164 ft 7 in)	
13	Maura Fiamoncini	Bucknell	49.90 m (163 ft 8 in)	
14	Nicolle Murphy	Minnesota	49.89 m (163 ft 8 in)	
15	Peyton Montgomery	Auburn	48.54 m (159 ft 3 in)	
15	Marie-Therese Obst	Georgia	48.54 m (159 ft 3 in)	PB
17	Brittni Wolczyk	Nebraska	48.38 m (158 ft 8 in)	
18	Haley Crouser	Texas	47.26 m (155 ft 0 in)	
19	Callie Jones	Southern Miss.	47.01 m (154 ft 2 in)	
20	Tairyn Montgomery	Georgia	46.76 m (153 ft 4 in)	
21	Morgan Woods	McNeese State	45.57 m (149 ft 6 in)	
22	Stephanie Sievers	Penn State	43.99 m (144 ft 3 in)	
23	(Canada) Keira McCarrell	Oregon	43.07 m (141 ft 3 in)	
	Madalaine Stulce	Texas A&M	FOUL	

==== Women's hammer throw ====
University of Mississippi senior Janeah Stewart won the women's hammer throw on June 7 in a personal-best mark of 72.92 m (239 ft 2 in).

Rank	Athlete	Team	Distance	Notes
1st place, gold medalist(s)	Janeah Stewart	Ole Miss	72.92 m (239 ft 2 in)	PB
2nd place, silver medalist(s)	Brooke Andersen	Northern Arizona	72.87 m (239 ft 0 in)	
3rd place, bronze medalist(s)	(Greece) Stamatia Scarvelis	Tennessee	69.10 m (226 ft 8 in)	PB
4	Alyssa Wilson	UCLA	66.99 m (219 ft 9 in)	PB
5	Maddy Nilles	North Dakota State	66.49 m (218 ft 1 in)	PB
6	(Czech Republic) Pavla Kuklova	Virginia Tech	66.18 m (217 ft 1 in)	PB
7	(Norway) Helene Ingvaldsen	Kansas State	64.77 m (212 ft 6 in)	PB
8	Valarie Allman	Stanford	63.52 m (208 ft 4 in)	
9	Temi Ogunrinde	Minnesota	62.90 m (206 ft 4 in)	
10	(Sweden) Emma Thor	Virginia Tech	62.83 m (206 ft 1 in)	
11	Ashley Bryant	Oklahoma	62.75 m (205 ft 10 in)	
12	Leia Mistowski	William and Mary	61.97 m (203 ft 3 in)	
13	Janee' Kassanavoid	Kansas State	61.51 m (201 ft 9 in)	
14	Jillian Shippee	North Carolina	61.10 m (200 ft 5 in)	
15	(Jamaica) Nayoka Clunis	Minnesota	61.03 m (200 ft 2 in)	
16	Kelcey Bedard	Colorado St.	60.94 m (199 ft 11 in)	
17	Gabrielle Figueroa	Kent State	60.94 m (199 ft 11 in)	
18	Makenli Forrest	Louisville	60.81 m (199 ft 6 in)	
19	(Estonia) Ksenia Safonova	Towson	60.69 m (199 ft 1 in)	
20	Dasiana Larson	Liberty	60.10 m (197 ft 2 in)	
21	(United Kingdom) Emma O'Hara	Maryland	59.65 m (195 ft 8 in)	
22	Lara Boman	South Dakota	57.57 m (188 ft 10 in)	
23	Rachel Wilson	Penn	57.10 m (187 ft 4 in)	
24	Kaylee Antill	Arizona State	55.79 m (183 ft 0 in)	

==== Heptathlon ====
The women's heptathlon began on June 8. 20 of the 24 competitors completed the event. The competition was close throughout, but Canadian athlete Georgia Ellenwood of the University of Wisconsin–Madison won the event by scoring more points in the 800 m over second-placer Louisa Grauvogel of the University of Georgia.

Rank	Athlete	Team	Overall points	100 m	HJ	SP	200 m	LJ	JT	800 m
1st place, gold medalist(s)	(Canada) Georgia Ellenwood	Wisconsin	6146	1036; 13.60	991; 1.81 m (5 ft 11 1/4 in)	692; 12.47 m (40 ft 10 3/4 in)	949; 24.33	862; 6.04 m (19 ft 9 3/4 in)	734; 43.45 m (142 ft 6 in)	882; 2:15.76
2nd place, silver medalist(s)	(Germany) Louisa Grauvogel	Georgia	6074	1132; 12.95	916; 1.75 m (5 ft 8 3/4 in)	696; 12.52 m (41 ft 3/4 in)	1008; 23.72	762; 5.71 m (18 ft 8 3/4 in)	735; 43.50 m (142 ft 8 in)	825; 2:19.92
3rd place, bronze medalist(s)	Madeline Holmberg	Penn State	5833	970; 14.06	771; 1.63 m (5 ft 4 in)	773; 13.68 m (44 ft 10 1/2 in)	953; 24.29	846; 5.99 m (19 ft 7 3/4 in)	685; 40.91 m (134 ft 2 in)	835; 2:19.16
4	Kendall Gustafson	UCLA	5800	952; 14.19	916; 1.75 m (5 ft 8 3/4 in)	698; 12.55 m (41 ft 2 in)	874; 25.14	783; 5.78 m (18 ft 11 1/2 in)	730; 43.27 m (141 ft 11 in)	847; 2:18.27
5	Amanda Froeynes	Florida	5794	941; 14.27	916; 1.75 m (5 ft 8 3/4 in)	675; 12.21 m (40 ft 1/2 in)	833; 25.60	780; 5.77 m (18 ft 11 in)	756; 44.63 m (146 ft 5 in)	893; 2:14.98
6	Alissa Brooks-Johnson	Washington St.	5789	1001; 13.84	806; 1.66 m (5 ft 5 1/4 in)	719; 12.87 m (42 ft 2 1/2 in)	893; 24.93	765; 5.72 m (18 ft 9 in)	722; 42.87 m (140 ft 7 in)	883; 2:15.69
7	(Canada) Nina Schultz	Kansas State	5778	1020; 13.71	916; 1.75 m (5 ft 8 3/4 in)	674; 12.19 m (39 ft 11 3/4 in)	842; 25.49	810; 5.87 m (19 ft 3 in)	678; 40.55 m (133 ft 0 in)	838; 2:18.95
8	(Trinidad and Tobago) Tyra Gittens	Texas A&M	5748	1078; 13.31	879; 1.72 m (5 ft 7 1/2 in)	689; 12.42 m (40 ft 8 3/4 in)	902; 24.83	893; 6.14 m (20 ft 1 1/2 in)	613; 37.17 m (121 ft 11 in)	694; 2:29.95
9	(Jamaica) Ayesha Champagnie	Minnesota	5740	974; 14.03	771; 1.63 m (5 ft 4 in)	767; 13.59 m (44 ft 7 in)	897; 24.89	747; 5.66 m (18 ft 6 3/4 in)	837; 48.82 m (160 ft 2 in)	747; 2:25.79
10	Jaclyn Siefring	Akron	5725	952; 14.19	879; 1.72 m (5 ft 7 1/2 in)	649; 11.82 m (38 ft 9 1/4 in)	915; 24.69	828; 5.93 m (19 ft 5 1/4 in)	588; 35.85 m (117 ft 7 in)	914; 2:13.53
11	Ashtin Zamzow	Texas	5667	1000; 13.85	806; 1.66 m (5 ft 5 1/4 in)	698; 12.56 m (41 ft 2 1/4 in)	887; 25.00	735; 5.62 m (18 ft 5 1/4 in)	730; 43.24 m (141 ft 10 in)	811; 2:20.92
12	Hope Bender	UC Santa Barbara	5653	1017; 13.73	806; 1.66 m (5 ft 5 1/4 in)	654; 11.89 m (39 ft 0 in)	961; 24.21	738; 5.63 m (18 ft 5 1/2 in)	588; 35.85 m (117 ft 7 in)	889; 2:15.24
13	(Liberia) Maya Neal	Tennessee	5555	1011; 13.77	771; 1.63 m (5 ft 4 in)	676; 12.22 m (40 ft 1 in)	915; 24.69	846; 5.99 m (19 ft 7 3/4 in)	601; 36.54 m (119 ft 10 in)	735; 2:26.70
14	Shaina Burns	Texas A&M	5553	970; 14.06	806; 1.66 m (5 ft 5 1/4 in)	778; 13.76 m (45 ft 1 1/2 in)	799; 25.98	738; 5.63 m (18 ft 5 1/2 in)	679; 40.62 m (133 ft 3 in)	783; 2:23.05
15	(Spain) Patricia Ortega	Akron	5542	1044; 13.54	879; 1.72 m (5 ft 7 1/2 in)	594; 10.99 m (36 ft 1/2 in)	901; 24.85	651; 5.33 m (17 ft 5 3/4 in)	579; 35.38 m (116 ft 0 in)	894; 2:14.88
16	Lyndsey Lopes	USC	5504	1053; 13.48	879; 1.72 m (5 ft 7 1/2 in)	562; 10.50 m (34 ft 5 1/4 in)	943; 24.40	726; 5.59 m (18 ft 4 in)	613; 37.16 m (121 ft 10 in)	728; 2:27.24
17	Aliyah Whisby	Kennesaw State	5490	1036; 13.60	916; 1.75 m (5 ft 8 3/4 in)	625; 11.45 m (37 ft 6 3/4 in)	945; 24.38	810; 5.87 m (19 ft 3 in)	420; 27.01 m (88 ft 7 in)	738; 2:26.43
18	Aaron Howell	Michigan	5404	998; 13.86	842; 1.69 m (5 ft 6 1/2 in)	717; 12.84 m (42 ft 1 1/2 in)	718; 26.93	640; 5.29 m (17 ft 4 1/4 in)	730; 43.28 m (141 ft 11 in)	759; 2:24.84

== Standings ==
=== Men ===
- Only top ten teams shown

Rank	University	Score	Notes
1st place, gold medalist(s)	Georgia	52	
2nd place, silver medalist(s)	Florida	42	
3rd place, bronze medalist(s)	Houston	35	
4	USC	34	
5 (tie)	Alabama	33	
5 (tie)	Texas Tech	33	
7	Texas A&M	29	
8 (tie)	Stanford	28	
8 (tie)	LSU	28	
10	Mississippi State	26	

=== Women ===
- Only top ten teams shown

Rank	University	Score	Notes
1st place, gold medalist(s)	USC	53	
2nd place, silver medalist(s)	Georgia	52	
3rd place, bronze medalist(s)	Stanford	51	
4	Kentucky	46	
5	Florida	42	
6	LSU	41	
7	Oregon	39	
8	Purdue	34	
9	Arizona State	25	
10	Virginia Tech	21.5	

== See also ==
- NCAA Men's Division I Outdoor Track and Field Championships
- NCAA Women's Division I Outdoor Track and Field Championships
