= Mario Burke =

Barbadian sprinter (born 1997)

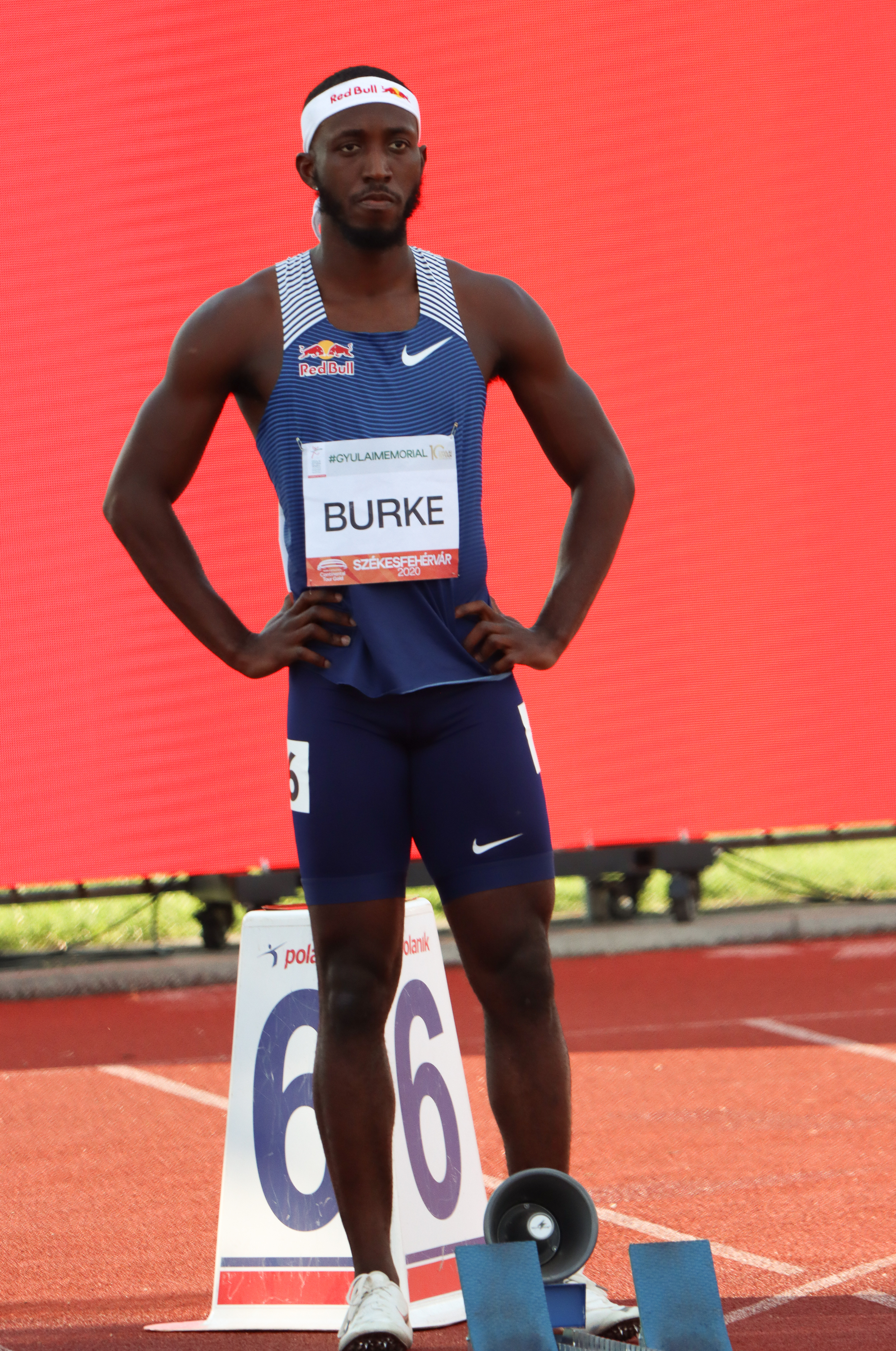
- Mario Burke at the 2020 Gyulai Memorial in Szekesfehervar, Hungary

Personal information
- Full name: Mario Omar Burke
- Born: 18 March 1997 (age 29) Bridgetown, Barbados
- Height: 6 ft 0 in (1.83 m)

Sport
- Sport: Track and field
- Event: Sprints
- College team: Houston Cougars
- Coached by: Leroy Burrell and Carl Lewis

Achievements and titles
- Personal bests: 60 m: 6.55 (Birmingham, 2019); 100 m: 9.95* (Austin, 2019); 200 m: 20.08 (Austin, 2019)
Medal record
Men's athletics
Representing Barbados
World Relays
Silver medal – second place	2017 Nassau	4×100 m relay
NACAC Championships
Silver medal – second place	2018 Toronto	4×100 m relay
CAC Games
Gold medal – first place	2018 Barranquilla	4×100 m relay
NACAC U23 Championships
Bronze medal – third place	2019 Querétaro	100 m
World U20 Championships
Bronze medal – third place	2016 Bydgoszcz	100 m
CARIFTA Games (U20)
Gold medal – first place	2015 Basseterre	100 m
Gold medal – first place	2015 Basseterre	200 m
Silver medal – second place	2016 St. George's	100 m
Bronze medal – third place	2016 St. George's	4×100 m relay
CACAC Junior Championships (U18)
Silver medal – second place	2012 San Salvador	4×400 m relay
CARIFTA Games (U17)
Gold medal – first place	2013 Nassau	100 m
Silver medal – second place	2013 Nassau	200 m
Bronze medal – third place	2012 Devonshire	200 m

Mario Omar Burke (born 18 March 1997) is a Barbadian sprinter. He currently attends the University of Houston. Burke won a bronze medal in the 100 metres at 2016 World Junior Championships in Athletics. On June 24, 2017, Burke won the 100 metres race at the Barbados National Championships.

He opened his 2019 season with a world-leading time of 6.56 seconds in the 60 meters at the Red Raider Invite meet. He went on to place second over the same distance at the NCAA Division I Indoor Championships with a new personal best time of 6.55 s.

On June 5, 2019, at the NCAA Division I Championships, he became the second Barbadian to break the 10-second barrier with a legal time of 9.98 s. He had previously broken the 10-second barrier with a 9.95 s clocking at the American Athletic Conference Championships a few weeks earlier, but the race was wind-assisted.

== Statistics ==
Information from IAAF profile or Track & Field Results Reporting System unless otherwise noted.

=== Personal bests ===
Event	Time	Wind (m/s)	Competition	Venue	Date	Notes
60 m	6.55	n/a	NCAA Division I Indoor Championships	Birmingham, Alabama, U.S.	March 9, 2019	
100 m	9.98	+1.3	NCAA Division I Championships	Austin, Texas, U.S.	5 June 2019	
100 m	9.95 w	+3.2	AAC Championships	Wichita, Kansas, U.S.	12 May 2019	Wind-assisted
200 m	20.08	+0.7	NCAA Division I Championships	Austin, Texas, U.S.	5 June 2019	
4×100 m relay	38.17	n/a	NCAA Division I Championships	Eugene, Oregon, U.S.	8 June 2018	Former NCAAR (Note: Shared with John Lewis III, Elijah Hall, and Cameron Burrell for the Houston Cougars.)

=== 100 m seasonal bests ===
Year	Time	Wind (m/s)	Venue	Date
2012	10.65	+0.4	San Salvador, El Salvador	29 June
2013	10.49	+0.3	Donetsk, Ukraine	11 July
2013	10.47 w	+3.5	Port of Spain, Trinidad and Tobago	2 March
2014	10.50	0.0	St. Michael, Barbados	9 March
2015	10.21	+1.5	Basseterre, St. Kitts and Nevis	4 April
2016	10.26	+0.2	Bydgoszcz, Poland	20 July
2017	10.17	+0.2	St. Michael, Barbados	24 June
2017	10.14 w	+4.2	Austin, Texas, U.S.	25 May
2018	10.03	+0.5	Barranquilla, Colombia	29 July
2019	9.95 w	+3.2	Wichita, Kansas, U.S.	12 May
2019	9.98	+1.3	Austin, Texas, U.S.	5 June
2020	10.32	+0.3	Prairie View, Texas, U.S.	30 July
2021	10.32	+2.0	Miramar, Florida, U.S.	10 April
2022	10.54	+1.1	Port of Spain, Trinidad and Tobago	24 June

=== International championship results ===
Year	Competition	Venue	Position	Event	Time	Wind (m/s)	Notes
Representing Barbados
2012	CARIFTA Games (U17)	Devonshire, Bermuda	4th	100 m	10.71 w	+3.6	Wind-assisted
2012	CARIFTA Games (U17)	Devonshire, Bermuda	3rd	200 m	22.23	−0.5	
2012	CACAC Junior Championships (U18)	San Salvador, El Salvador	7th	100 m	10.87	−0.6	
2012	CACAC Junior Championships (U18)	San Salvador, El Salvador	5th (semi 1)	200 m	23.08	+0.4	
2012	CACAC Junior Championships (U18)	San Salvador, El Salvador	2nd	4×400 m relay	3:14.31	n/a	PB
2013	CARIFTA Games (U17)	Nassau, Bahamas	1st	100 m	10.61	+0.5	
2013	CARIFTA Games (U17)	Nassau, Bahamas	2nd	200 m	21.42 w	+2.2	Wind-assisted
2013	World Youth Championships	Donetsk, Ukraine	5th	100 m	10.51	−0.4	
2014	CARIFTA Games (U18)	Fort-de-France, Martinique	DQ	100 m	—	—	False start
2015	CARIFTA Games (U20)	Basseterre, St. Kitts and Nevis	1st	100 m	10.21	+1.5	PB
2015	CARIFTA Games (U20)	Basseterre, St. Kitts and Nevis	1st	200 m	21.51	−0.6	SB
2015	World Relays	Nassau, Bahamas	2nd (final 2)	4×100 m relay	38.70	n/a	NR, PB
2016	CARIFTA Games (U20)	St. George's, Grenada	2nd	100 m	10.29	+1.4	SB
2016	CARIFTA Games (U20)	St. George's, Grenada	4th	200 m	21.14 w	+4.5	Wind-assisted
2016	CARIFTA Games (U20)	St. George's, Grenada	3rd	4×100 m relay	40.97	n/a	
2016	World U20 Championships	Bydgoszcz, Poland	3rd	100 m	10.26	−0.2	SB
2016	World U20 Championships	Bydgoszcz, Poland	4th (semi 3)	4×100 m relay	40.14	n/a	NU20R
2017	World Relays	Nassau, Bahamas	2nd	4×100 m relay	39.18	n/a	SB
2017	World Championships	London, England	6th (quarter 3)	100 m	10.42	0.0	
2017	World Championships	London, England	8th (semi 1)	4×100 m relay	39.19	n/a	
2018	CAC Games	Barranquilla, Columba	4th	100 m	10.17	+1.7	
2018	CAC Games	Barranquilla, Columba	1st	4×100 m relay	38.41	n/a	NR
2018	NACAC Championships	Toronto, Ontario, Canada	4th (semi 2)	100 m	10.29	+1.5	
2018	NACAC Championships	Toronto, Ontario, Canada	2nd	4×100 m relay	38.69	n/a	
2019	NACAC U23 Championships	Querétaro, Mexico	3rd	100 m	10.01	+1.1	10.010 s CR (Note: The top three finishers, including Mario Burke, finished with a rounded up time of 10.01 s; Waseem Williams (10.002 s) placed ahead of Samson Colebrooke (10.004 s) who placed ahead of Mario Burke (10.010 s) as determined by the thousandths of a second measurements.)
2019	NACAC U23 Championships	Querétaro, Mexico	DQ	200 m	—	—	False start
2019	Pan American Games	Lima, Peru	14th	100 m	10.46	−0.3	
2019	World Championships	Doha, Qatar	31st	100 m	10.31	+0.1	
2021	Olympic Games	Tokyo, Japan	59th (h)	100 m	15.81	+0.8	
2022	World Indoor Championships	Belgrade, Serbia	16th (sf)	60 m	6.67	n/a	
2024	World Indoor Championships	Glasgow, United Kingdom	9th (sf)	60 m	6.57	n/a	
2025	NACAC Championships	Freeport, Bahamas	4th	4 × 100 m relay	39.03	n/a	

=== National championship results ===
Year	Competition	Venue	Position	Event	Time	Wind (m/s)	Notes
2012	Barbados Championships	Bridgetown, Barbados	2nd	100 m	10.81	−0.9	PB
2012	Barbados Championships	Bridgetown, Barbados	5th	200 m	21.77	−0.5	PB
2013	Barbados Championships	Bridgetown, Barbados	7th	100 m	10.62	+0.1	
2015	Barbados Championships	Bridgetown, Barbados	4th	100 m	10.39	+1.7	
Representing the Houston Cougars
2016	NCAA Division I Championships	Eugene, Oregon, U.S.	2nd	4×100 m relay	38.44	n/a	PB
2017	NCAA Division I Indoor Championships	College Town, Texas, U.S.	7th	60 m	6.66	n/a	
2017	NCAA Division I Championships	Eugene, Oregon, U.S.	15th	100 m	10.19	+1.3	PB
2017	NCAA Division I Championships	Eugene, Oregon, U.S.	1st	4×100 m relay	38.34	n/a	PB
2017	Barbados Championships	Bridgetown, Barbados	1st	100 m	10.17	+0.2	PB
2017	Barbados Championships	Bridgetown, Barbados	3rd	200 m	20.60	+1.3	PB
2018	NCAA Division I Indoor Championships	College Station, Texas, U.S.	13th	4×400 m relay	3:08.86	n/a	
2018	NCAA Division I Championships	Eugene, Oregon, U.S.	8th	100 m	10.41	−0.9	
2018	NCAA Division I Championships	Eugene, Oregon, U.S.	1st	4×100 m relay	38.17	n/a	NCAAR, PB
2018	NCAA Division I Championships	Eugene, Oregon, U.S.	5th	4×400 m relay	3:04.03	n/a	PB
2018	Barbados Championships	Bridgetown, Barbados	1st	100 m	10.27	−0.2	
2018	Barbados Championships	Bridgetown, Barbados	2nd	200 m	20.68	+0.4	
2019	NCAA Division I Indoor Championships	Birmingham, Alabama, U.S.	2nd	60 m	6.55	n/a	PB
2019	NCAA Division I Championships	Austin, Texas, U.S.	6th	100 m	10.06	+0.8	
2019	NCAA Division I Championships	Austin, Texas, U.S.	4th	200 m	20.11	+0.8	
2019	Barbados Championships	Bridgetown, Barbados	1st	100 m	10.24	+0.2	
