= Cameron Burrell =

American sprinter (1994–2021)

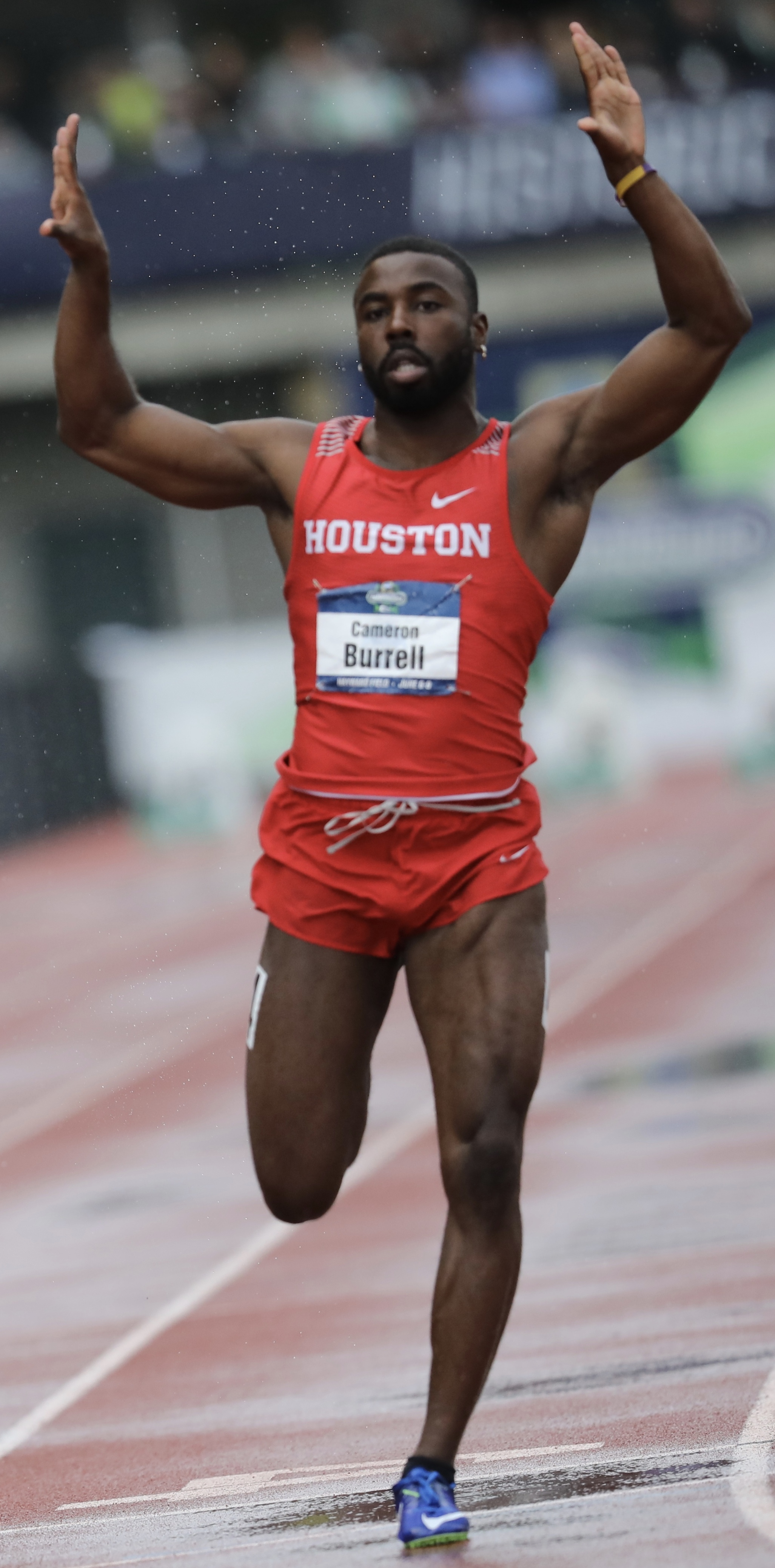
- Burrell winning at the 2018 NCAA Division I Outdoor Track and Field Championships

Personal information
- Nationality: American
- Born: Cameron Malik Burrell; September 11, 1994 Houston, Texas, U.S.
- Died: August 9, 2021 (aged 26) Houston, Texas, U.S.
- Employers: Nike and Red Bull

Sport
- Sport: Track and field
- Events: 60 m; 100 m; Long jump; 4×100 m relay
- College team: Houston Cougars (2014–2018)
- Turned pro: June 2018
- Coached by: Leroy Burrell and Carl Lewis

Achievements and titles
- Personal bests: 60 m: 6.48 s (2016); 100 m: 9.93 s (2017, 2018); 200 m: 20.75 s (2016); Long jump: 8.06 m (2015, 26 ft 5 1/4 in)
Medal record
Men's track and field
Representing the United States
World Relays
Silver medal – second place	2019 Yokohama	4×100 m relay
Athletics World Cup
Gold medal – first place	2018 London	4×100 m relay
NACAC Championships
Bronze medal – third place	2018 Toronto	100 m
Gold medal – first place	2015 San José	Long jump
Universiade
Silver medal – second place	2017 Taipei	4×100 m relay
Bronze medal – third place	2017 Taipei	100 m
World Junior Championships
Gold medal – first place	2012 Barcelona	4×100 m relay
Pan American Junior Championships
Gold medal – first place	2013 Medellín	4×100 m relay
World Youth Championships
Gold medal – first place	2011 Villneuve-d'Ascq	Medley relay

Cameron Malik Burrell (September 11, 1994 – August 9, 2021) was an American sprinter. He was the NCAA Division I champion over 100 meters in 2018, and anchored the Houston Cougars to victory in the 4 × 100 meters relay in 2017 and 2018. He ran for the United States 4 × 100 m relay team at the World Junior Championships in 2012 and the World Relays in 2019, with the team earning gold and silver from each competition respectively. Additionally Burrell anchored the U.S. 4 × 100 m relay team to gold at the inaugural Athletics World Cup in 2018.

He was the son of Olympic champion and former 100 meters world record holder Leroy Burrell and Olympic champion Michelle Finn-Burrell. He was also the godson of former track and field star Carl Lewis. On June 8, 2017, he became the 121st man to break the 10-second barrier over 100 meters in a time of 9.93 seconds, beating his father's school record set five years before Cameron's birth by one hundredth of a second. He repeated this feat a year later at the USA Championships.

== Early life ==
Cameron Malik Burrell was born on September 11, 1994, to former 100m world record holder Leroy Burrell and Olympic gold medalist Michelle Finn-Burrell. He has two siblings, Joshua and Jaden. Growing up, Cameron Burrell was surrounded by athletics; in addition to his parents' athletic background, his aunt Dawn Burrell was the 2001 World Indoor Champion in the Long Jump. His father's teammate and close friend was Carl Lewis, who knew Cameron his whole life. Despite this, his family never forced him into athletics, though Cameron already knew he wanted to be a sprinter at a very young age.

Cameron attended Ridge Point High School in Missouri City, Texas. Throughout his junior years, he competed at the 2011 World Youth Championships in Lille, the 2012 World Junior Championships in Barcelona, and the 2013 Pan American Junior Championships in Medellín. He also formed a close friendship with his rival from Morton Ranch High School, Elijah Hall. After graduating from Ridge Point in June 2013, Burrell chose to follow in his father's footsteps and attend the University of Houston, where his father was coaching.

== Collegiate career ==
=== 2014–2015 ===
During his freshman year, Burrell made the NCAA Indoor 60m final, where he finished 6th. Outdoors, he ran a leg on the 4 × 100 m relay at the NCAA Outdoor Championships but finished 7th in the heats and did not qualify for the final. He started out strong in his sophomore season, but suffered an injury and was forced to miss the Indoor Championships and Redshirt his outdoor season.

=== 2016 ===
Burrell returned to competition in 2016, and finished 2nd in the NCAA 60m final, setting a school record at 6.48. Outdoors, he won his first conference title in the 100m and finished 4th at the NCAA Championships in 10.26.

=== 2017 ===
Burrell once again finished 2nd at the NCAA 60m final, this time to Christian Coleman of Tennessee, who equaled the collegiate record of 6.45. During the outdoor season, he broke his father's long-standing school record in the 100m with 9.93 during the semifinals of the NCAA Championships. In the final, he finished second to Coleman again. During the 4 × 100 m however, he anchored Houston to the victory in 38.34.

=== 2018 ===
Having already completed four indoor seasons, Burrell was able to compete only outdoors. At the NCAA Championships, he anchored the Cougars to a collegiate record in the 4 × 100 m, defending their title from the previous year. Then, with two other Cougars in the 100m final, he finally won his first NCAA individual title, with Elijah Hall 2nd and Mario Burke 8th. Burrell dedicated his win to his teammate Brian Barraza, who fell after leading in the steeplechase and finished in 10th.

Burrell equaled his personal best of 9.93 in the heats of the US Championships, then went on to finish 5th in the final. He competed at the inaugural Athletics World Cup in London, England, anchoring the US' 4 × 100 m team to victory in 38.42 seconds. He stayed in London for his Diamond League debut at the Anniversary Games, where he placed 4th in his heat and 9th in the final. Burrell then traveled to Toronto for the NACAC Championships, and picked up a bronze medal in the 100m.

After their seasons ended, Burrell and Elijah Hall turned professional and signed with Nike and Red Bull.

== Death ==
Burrell died on August 9, 2021, at the age of 26. It was later revealed he died by suicide from a gunshot in a parking garage in Houston, Texas.

== Statistics ==
- Information from World Athletics profile unless otherwise noted.

=== Personal bests ===
Event	Time or mark	Wind (m/s)	Venue	Date	Notes
60 m	6.48	—N/a	Birmingham, Alabama, US	March 12, 2016	Indoor
100 m	9.93	+0.8	Eugene, Oregon, US	June 7, 2017	
100 m	9.93	+1.4	Des Moines, Iowa, US	June 21, 2018	
100 m	9.90 w	+4.5	Austin, Texas, US	May 25, 2017	Wind-assisted
200 m	20.75	+0.1	Orlando, Florida, US	May 14, 2016	
200 m	20.64 w	+2.7	Houston, Texas, US	May 7, 2021	Wind-assisted
4×100 m relay	38.17	—N/a	Eugene, Oregon, US	June 8, 2018	Former collegiate record (Note: Shared with John Lewis III, Elijah Hall, and Mario Burke for the Houston Cougars. Burrell was the fourth runner for the team.)
Long jump	8.06 m (26 ft 5 1/4 in)	−0.4	San José, Costa Rica	August 8, 2015	
Long jump	8.17 m (26 ft 9 1/2 in) w	+3.5	Eugene, Oregon, US	June 25, 2015	Wind-assisted

=== International championship results ===
Representing the United States
Year	Competition	Position	Event	Time or mark	Venue	Notes
2011	World Youth Championships	15th	Long jump	7.11 m (23 ft 3 3/4 in)	Villeneuve-d'Ascq, France	(+1.6 m/s wind)
2011	World Youth Championships	1st (semi 1)	Medley relay	1:51.13	Villeneuve-d'Ascq, France	WYL, PB, Q (Note: Burrell was replaced in the final, but the four runners that ran in the final finished first, earning the team gold medals.)
2012	World Junior Championships	1st (semi 2)	4×100 m relay	39.25	Barcelona, Spain	PB, Q
2013	Pan American Junior Championships	1st	4×100 m relay	39.17	Medellín, Colombia	PB
2015	NACAC Championships	1st	Long jump	8.06 m (26 ft 5 1/4 in)	San José, Costa Rica	(−0.4 m/s wind) Championship record, PB
2017	Universiade	3rd	100 m	10.27	Taipei, Taiwan	(−0.9 m/s wind)
2017	Universiade	2nd	4×100 m relay	38.69	Taipei, Taiwan	
2018	Athletics World Cup	1st	4×100 m relay	38.42	London, England	
2018	NACAC Championships	3rd	100 m	10.12	Toronto, Ontario, Canada	(+0.4 m/s wind)
2018	NACAC Championships	DNF	4×100 m relay	—	Toronto, Ontario, Canada	Teammate dropped baton
2019	World Relays	1st (semi 3)	4×100 m relay	38.34	Yokohama, Japan	Q (Note: Burrell was replaced in the final, but the four runners that ran in the final finished second, earning the team silver medals.)

=== National championship results ===
Representing CL Athletics Stars (2010–2013), the Houston Cougars (2014–2018), and Nike and Red Bull (2019)
Year	Competition	Position	Event	Time or mark	Wind (m/s)	Venue	Notes
2010	USATF Junior Championships	9th	Long jump	6.62 m (21 ft 8 1/2 in)	−0.5	Des Moines, Iowa	
2011	US World Youth Trials	9th	100 m	10.87	−1.4	Myrtle Beach, South Carolina	PB
2011	US World Youth Trials	1st	Long jump	7.37 m (24 ft 2 in)	+1.7	Myrtle Beach, South Carolina	PB
2012	USATF Junior Championships	4th	100 m	10.64	−1.8	Bloomington, Indiana	
2012	USATF Junior Championships	4th	Long jump	7.48 m (24 ft 6 1/4 in) w	+2.2	Bloomington, Indiana	Wind-assisted
2013	USATF Junior Championships	3rd	100 m	10.65	−4.8	Des Moines, Iowa	
2014	NCAA Division I Indoor Championships	6th	60 m	6.66 A	—N/a	Albuquerque, New Mexico	Altitude-assisted
2014	NCAA Division I Championships	16th	4×100 m relay	39.65	—N/a	Eugene, Oregon	
2015	USATF Championships	6th	Long jump	8.17 m (26 ft 9 1/2 in) w	+3.5	Eugene, Oregon	Wind-assisted
2016	NCAA Division I Indoor Championships	2nd	60 m	6.48	—N/a	Birmingham, Alabama	PB
2016	NCAA Division I Championships	4th	100 m	10.26	−2.3	Eugene, Oregon	
2016	NCAA Division I Championships	2nd	4×100 m relay	38.44	—N/a	Eugene, Oregon	PB
2016	US Olympic Trials	16th	100 m	10.18 w	+2.4	Eugene, Oregon	Wind-assisted
2017	NCAA Division I Indoor Championships	2nd	60 m	6.54	—N/a	College Station, Texas	
2017	NCAA Division I Championships	2nd	100 m	10.12	−2.1	Eugene, Oregon	
2017	NCAA Division I Championships	1st	4×100 m relay	38.34	—N/a	Eugene, Oregon	PB
2017	USATF Championships	7th	100 m	10.19	−0.7	Sacramento, California	
2018	NCAA Division I Championships	1st	100 m	10.13	−0.9	Eugene, Oregon	
2018	NCAA Division I Championships	1st	4×100 m relay	38.17	—N/a	Eugene, Oregon	Collegiate record, PB
2018	NCAA Division I Championships	1st (semi 2)	4×400 m relay	3:06.51	—N/a	Eugene, Oregon	Q (Note: Burrell was replaced in the final, and the four runners that ran in the final finished fifth.)
2018	USATF Championships	5th	100 m	10.04	+1.1	Des Moines, Iowa	
2019	USATF Championships	18th	100 m	10.43	−2.0	Des Moines, Iowa	

- NCAA results from Track & Field Results Reporting System.

=== Seasonal bests ===
Year	60 m	100 m	Long jump
2010	—	11.06 s	7.20 m (23 ft 7 1/4 in)
2011	6.94 s	10.41 s	7.49 m (24 ft 6 3/4 in)
2012	6.82 s	10.42 s	7.60 m (24 ft 11 in)
2013	6.61 s	10.36 s	7.09 m (23 ft 3 in)
2014	6.54 s	10.32 s	7.73 m (25 ft 4 1/4 in)
2015	6.60 s	—	8.06 m (26 ft 5 1/4 in)
2016	6.48 s	10.16 s	7.80 m (25 ft 7 in)
2017	6.53 s	9.93 s	—
2018	6.69 s	9.93 s	—
2019	6.60 s	10.12 s	—
2020	6.62 s	—	—
2021	6.58 s	10.01 s w	—
