= Elijah Hall (sprinter) =

American sprinter (born 1994)

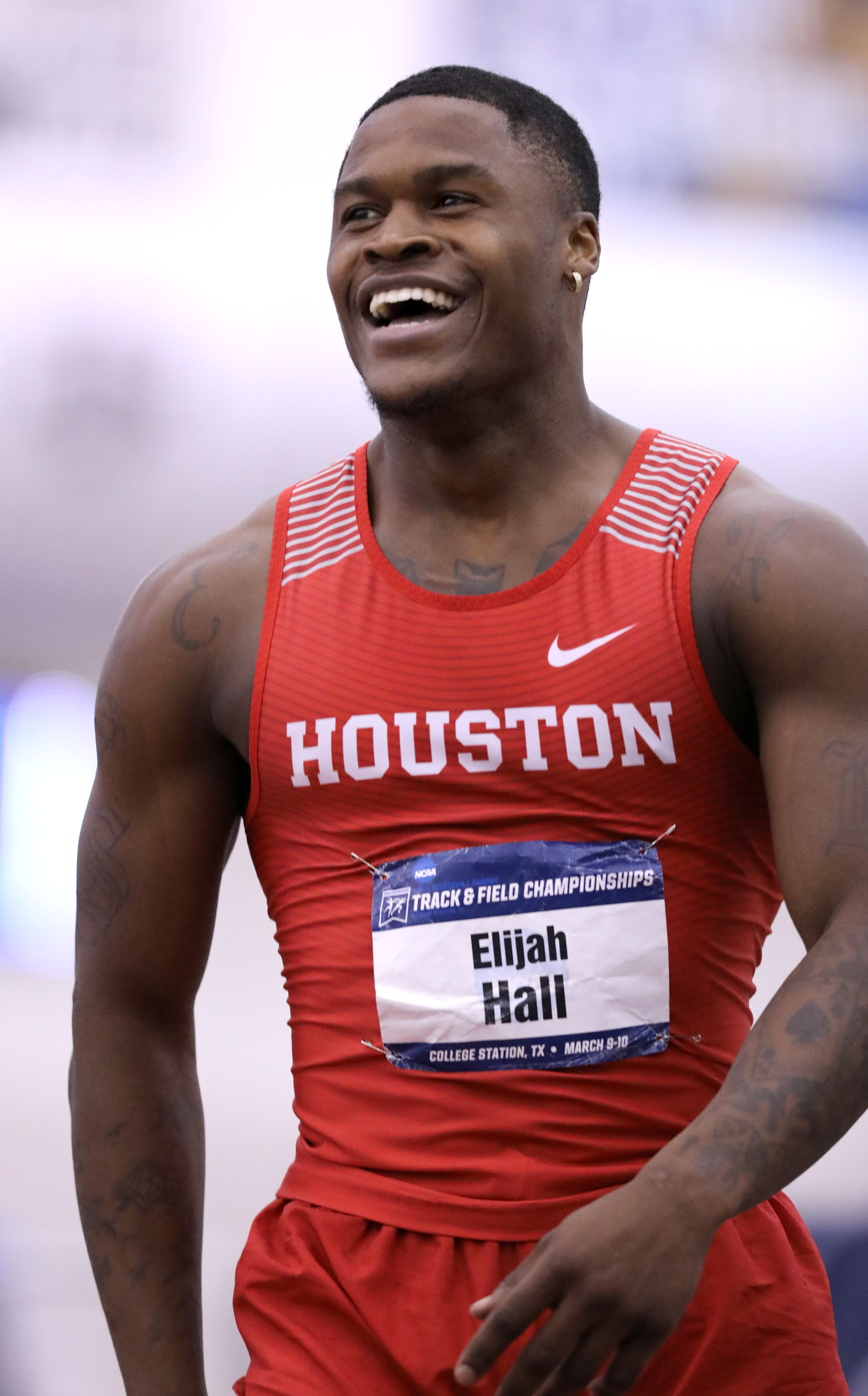
- Hall at the 2018 NCAA Division I Indoor Championships

Personal information
- Full name: Elijah Hall-Thompson
- Born: August 22, 1994 (age 31) Katy, Texas, U.S.
- Employer(s): Nike and Red Bull
- Height: 5 ft 10 in (178 cm)
- Weight: 185lb/84kg

Sport
- Country: United States
- Sport: Track and field
- Event: Sprints
- College team: Houston Cougars (2017–2018); Butler Grizzlies (2015–2016)
- Club: CL Athletics Stars (youth)
- Turned pro: June 2018
- Coached by: Leroy Burrell and Carl Lewis

Achievements and titles
- Personal bests: 60 m: 6.52 (2018); 100 m: 9.90 (2022); 200 m: 20.02 (2018, indoor NR)
Medal record
Men's athletics
Representing the United States
World Championships
Silver medal – second place	2022 Eugene	4×100 m relay

Elijah Hall-Thompson (born August 22, 1994) is an American track and field sprinter and American record holder in the indoor 200 meters. At the NCAA Division I Championships he helped the Houston Cougars win and set the collegiate record in the 4 × 100 meters relay in 2018, and won both the 60 meters and the 200 meters at the NCAA Division I Indoor Championships in 2018. His winning time of 20.02 seconds in the 200 meters is the second fastest time ever achieved over the distance indoors.

Hall qualified to represent the United States for the 2017 World Championships in the 200 m, but withdrew due to an injury.

== Early life ==
Elijah Hall grew up in Texas and attended Morton Ranch High School, where he played American football. Due to his football speed, he would run track after the football season ended. After his junior season, Hall tore his ACL; after recovering, he broke his arm during football the following year. However, he clocked an impressive 20.60 seconds over the 200m at the Texas UIL 6A State Championships. He began to take more interest in track, and joined a club during the summer where he trained with his track rival from Ridge Point High School, Cameron Burrell, son of former world record holder Leroy Burrell. Hall decided to leave football behind in order to be a healthier athlete, and focus on track.

== Collegiate career ==
=== 2015-2016: Community College ===
Hall attended Garden City Community College for a semester, then transferred to Butler County Community College. He won the NJCAA indoor title in the 200m, and finished 8th in the 60m. Injuries continued to plague him from time-to-time, and he was just able to help his team finish 2nd in the 4x100m. In 2016, he defended his indoor 200m title and finished 7th in the 60m. Outdoors, he won the 100m in 10.16 and finished 2nd in the 200m. He then competed at the Olympic Trials in Eugene, Oregon, finishing 6th in his 100m heat; and he was disqualified in his 200m heat.

=== 2017: Joining the Houston Cougars ===
Hall returned to Texas and transferred to the University of Houston, to join Burrell and to be coached by his father Leroy and track & field legend Carl Lewis. His injury returned as he pulled up in the 200m at the Fayetteville Tyson Invitational. Two months later, he appeared to be doing well outdoors, winning both the 100m and the 200m at the American Athletic Conference Championships, the latter in a wind-aided 19.96. His injury returned at the NCAA West Preliminary round, and he was forced to miss the NCAA Championships. Hall finally got his measure at the US Championships, where he finished 3rd in the 200m with 20.21 seconds and qualified for the World Championships in London, England. However, his injury returned yet again and he was forced to miss out.

=== 2018: National Record Holder ===
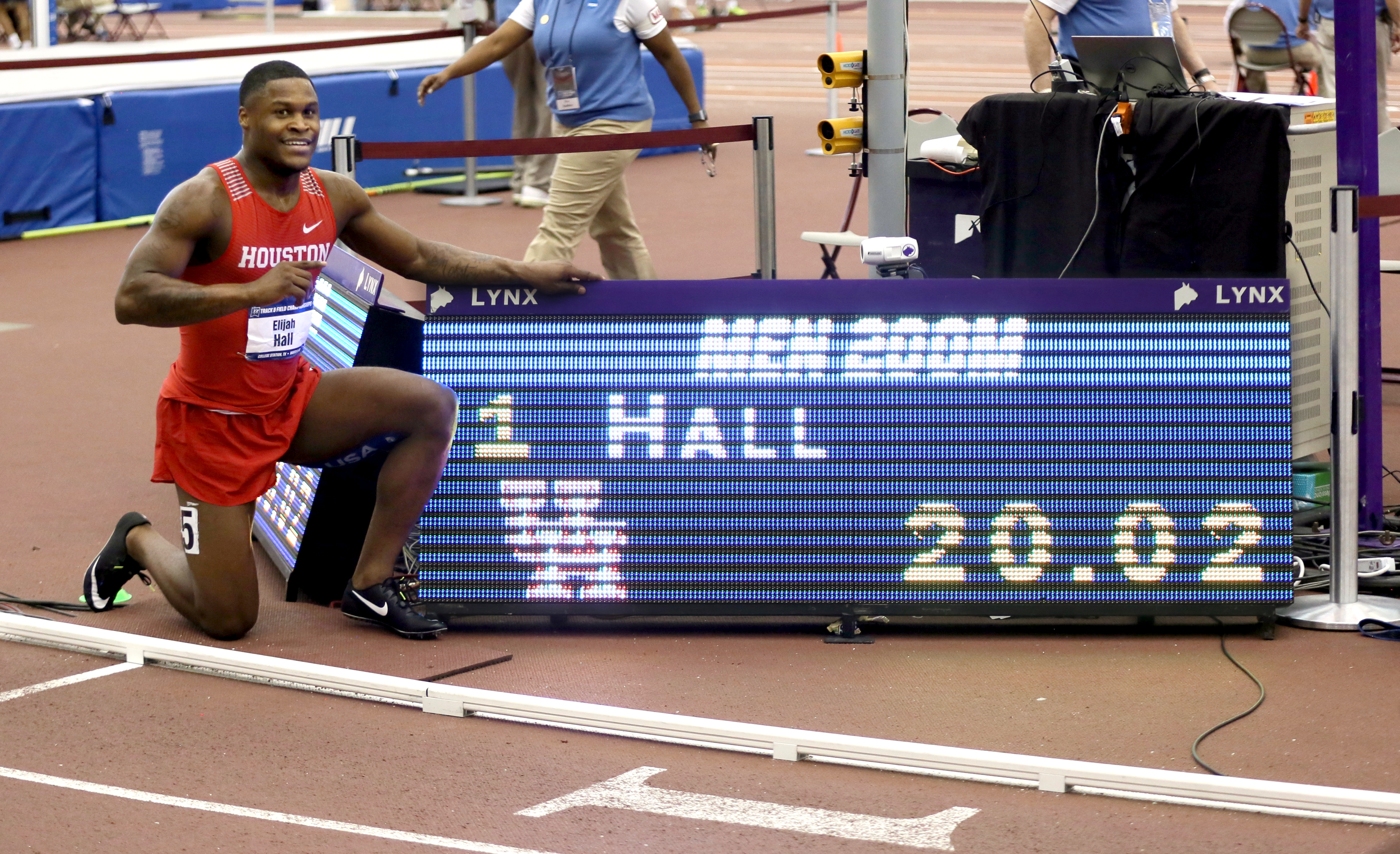
Hall posing with the clock after setting a collegiate record in the indoor 200m in 2018

Finally feeling healthy, Hall began to break through in the 2018 season. Leading up to the championships, he had only been defeated once between the 60m and the 200m. At the NCAA Indoor Championships, Hall stumbled in the 60m but was able to make an unbelievable late charge and win the title in a personal best of 6.52 seconds. Then, in the 200m, he set a collegiate, American and NACAC record of 20.02 seconds, the second-fastest time in history over the indoor 200m. He then helped Houston's 4x400m team to 4th place.

Despite his incredible 200m performance, Leroy Burrell and Carl Lewis decided for Hall to focus on the 100m for the outdoor season. Though his first few races were rough, he made it through to the final at the NCAA Championships with 2 other Cougars: Cameron and junior Mario Burke. Having put 3 athletes in the 100m final, Houston won the 4x100m with ease, defending their title and setting a collegiate record of 38.17 seconds in the rain. Then, in a surprise finish, Hall finished 2nd in the 100m behind Cameron, both defeating the favorite from Florida State Andre Ewers. Burke finished in 8th, meaning Houston scored 19 points in the final, contributing to their 2nd place team finish.

In October, Hall and Cameron turned professional and signed with Nike and Red Bull.

== Statistics ==
- All information from World Athletics profile unless otherwise noted.

=== Personal Bests ===
Event	Time	Wind (m/s)	Venue	Date	Notes
60 m	6.52	—N/a	College Station, Texas, US	March 10, 2018	Indoor
100 m	9.90	+1.8	Eugene, Oregon	June 24, 2022	
200 m	20.02	—N/a	College Station, Texas, US	March 10, 2018	Indoor #2 all-time, American and collegiate record
200 m	19.96 w	+2.1	Houston, Texas, US	May 14, 2017	Wind-assisted
4×100 m relay	38.17	—N/a	Eugene, Oregon, US	June 8, 2018	Former collegiate record (Note: Shared with John Lewis III, Mario Burke, and Cameron Burrell for the Houston Cougars. Hall was the second carrier, after Lewis and before Burke.)
4×200 m relay	1:21.17	—N/a	Philadelphia, Pennsylvania, US	April 29, 2017	

=== National championship results ===
- DNF = did not finish
- DQ = disqualified
- PB = personal best
- NR = national (American) record
- CR = collegiate record

Representing the Butler Grizzlies (2015–2016) and the Houston Cougars (2017–2018)
Year	Competition	Position	Event	Time	Wind (m/s)	Venue	Notes
2015	NJCAA Indoor Championships	8th	60 m	7.22	—N/a	Albuquerque, New Mexico	
2015	NJCAA Indoor Championships	DNF	200 m	—	—N/a	Albuquerque, New Mexico	
2015	NJCAA Division I Championships	DQ (semi 5)	100 m	—	+4.9	Hutchinson, Kansas	False start
2015	NJCAA Division I Championships	DNF (semi 5)	200 m	—	+6.6	Hutchinson, Kansas	
2015	NJCAA Division I Championships	2nd	4×100 m relay	40.12	—N/a	Hutchinson, Kansas	PB
2016	NJCAA Indoor Championships	7th	60 m	6.83	—N/a	Winston-Salem, North Carolina	
2016	NJCAA Indoor Championships	1st	200 m	21.25	—N/a	Winston-Salem, North Carolina	
2016	NJCAA Division I Championships	1st	100 m	10.16	+0.8	Levelland, Texas	PB
2016	NJCAA Division I Championships	2nd	200 m	20.37	+1.0	Levelland, Texas	PB
2016	NJCAA Division I Championships	1st	4×100 m relay	39.32	—N/a	Levelland, Texas	PB
2016	NJCAA Division I Championships	4th	4×400 m relay	3:12.57	—N/a	Levelland, Texas	PB
2016	US Olympic Trials	29th	100 m	10.29	+1.9	Eugene, Oregon	
2016	US Olympic Trials	DQ (heat 2)	200 m	—	+1.0	Eugene, Oregon	Lane violation
2017	US Championships	3rd	200 m	20.21	−2.1	Sacramento, California	PB
2018	NCAA Division I Indoor Championships	1st	60 m	6.52	—N/a	College Station, Texas	PB
2018	NCAA Division I Indoor Championships	1st	200 m	20.02	—N/a	College Station, Texas	Indoor #2 all-time, NR, CR
2018	NCAA Division I Indoor Championships	13th	4×400 m relay	3:08.86	—N/a	College Station, Texas	
2018	NCAA Division I Championships	2nd	100 m	10.17	−0.9	Eugene, Oregon	
2018	NCAA Division I Championships	1st	4×100 m relay	38.17	—N/a	Eugene, Oregon	CR, PB

- NJCAA and NCAA results from Track & Field Results Reporting System.

=== Seasonal bests ===
Year	60 meters	100 meters	200 meters
2010	—	10.93	21.53
2011	7.05	—	21.12
2012	—	—	20.86
2013	—	10.60	20.60
2014	6.80	—	—
2015	6.70	10.49	21.16
2016	6.72	10.16	20.37
2017	6.65	10.11	20.21
2018	6.52	10.10	20.02
2019	—	—	20.55
2020	6.71	10.23	20.69
2021	6.65	—	20.80

== Notes ==
Records
Preceded by Wallace Spearmon	Men's 200 meters indoor American record holder March 10, 2018 – present	Incumbent
