= Matt Ludwig =

American pole vaulter (born 1996)

Personal information
- Full name: Matthew Joseph Ludwig
- Born: July 5, 1996 (age 30)
- Home town: Chardon, Ohio, U.S.

Sport
- Country: United States
- Sport: Athletics
- Event: Pole vault
- University team: Missouri (2015–2017); Akron (2017–2019)
Medal record
Men's athletics
Representing the United States
Pan American Games
Gold medal – first place	2023 Santiago	Pole vault

Matthew Joseph "Matt" Ludwig (born July 5, 1996) is an American pole vaulter.

== Biography ==
Ludwig is a native of Ohio, where he attended Lake Catholic High School. He attended the University of Missouri before transferring to the University of Akron where he graduated in 2019 with a bachelor's degree in biomedical engineering.

Ludwig was originally an alternate on the three-man U.S. Olympic pole vault team at the 2020 Tokyo Olympics, but subsequently competed as an Olympian after bronze medalist and reigning world champion Sam Kendricks tested positive for COVID-19 and was declared out of the Tokyo Games.

== Career highlights ==
- 2017 Outdoor NCAA Champion
- 2020 U.S. Indoor Champion
- 2021 Tokyo Olympian (called up from alternate)
- Best indoors: 5.85m or (19 ft 2.5 in)
- Best outdoors: 5.90m (19 ft 4.25 in)
