= 2024 London Athletics Meet =

- Dates: 20 July 2024
- Host city: London
- Venue: London Stadium
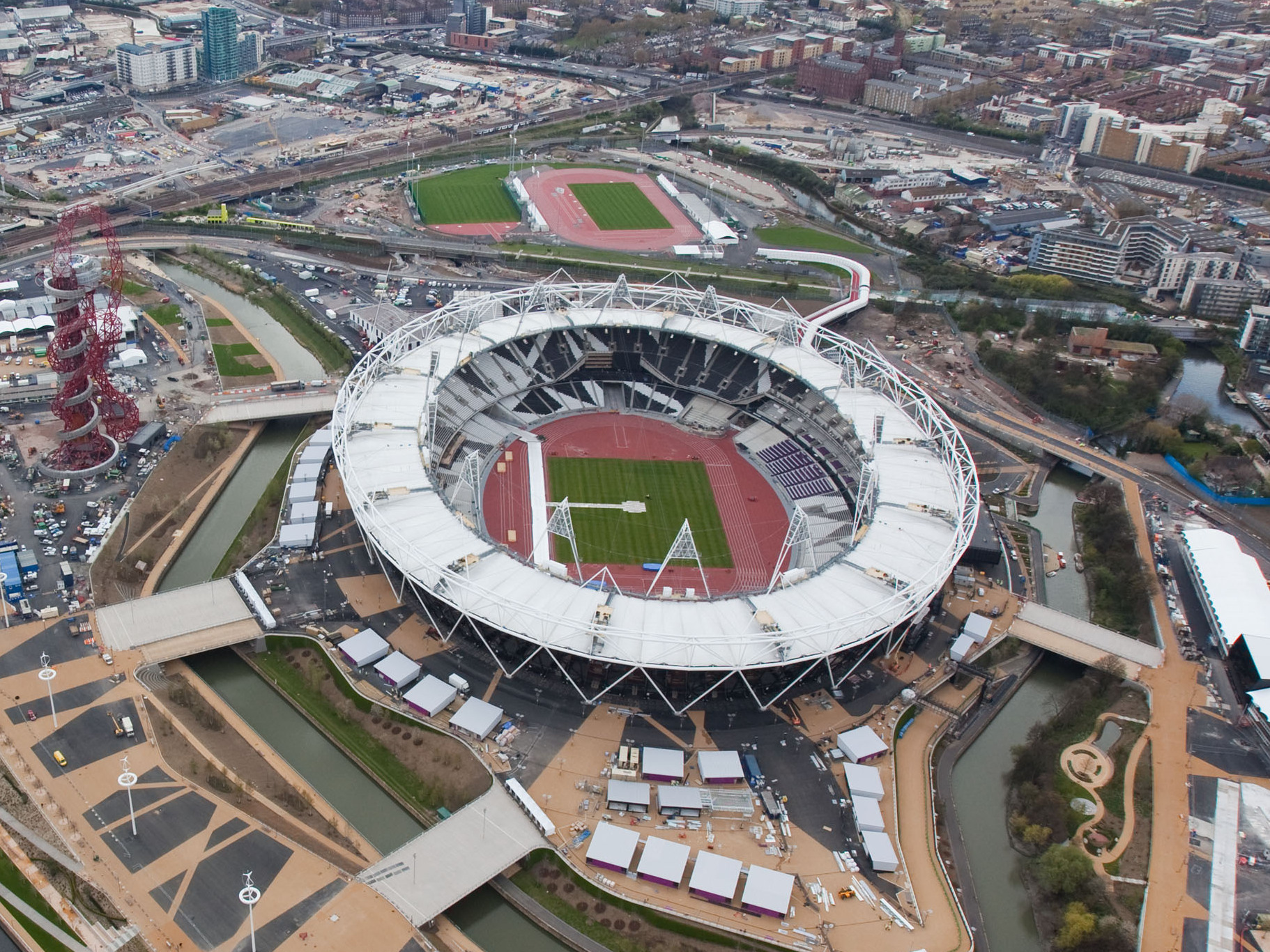
- Level: 2024 Diamond League

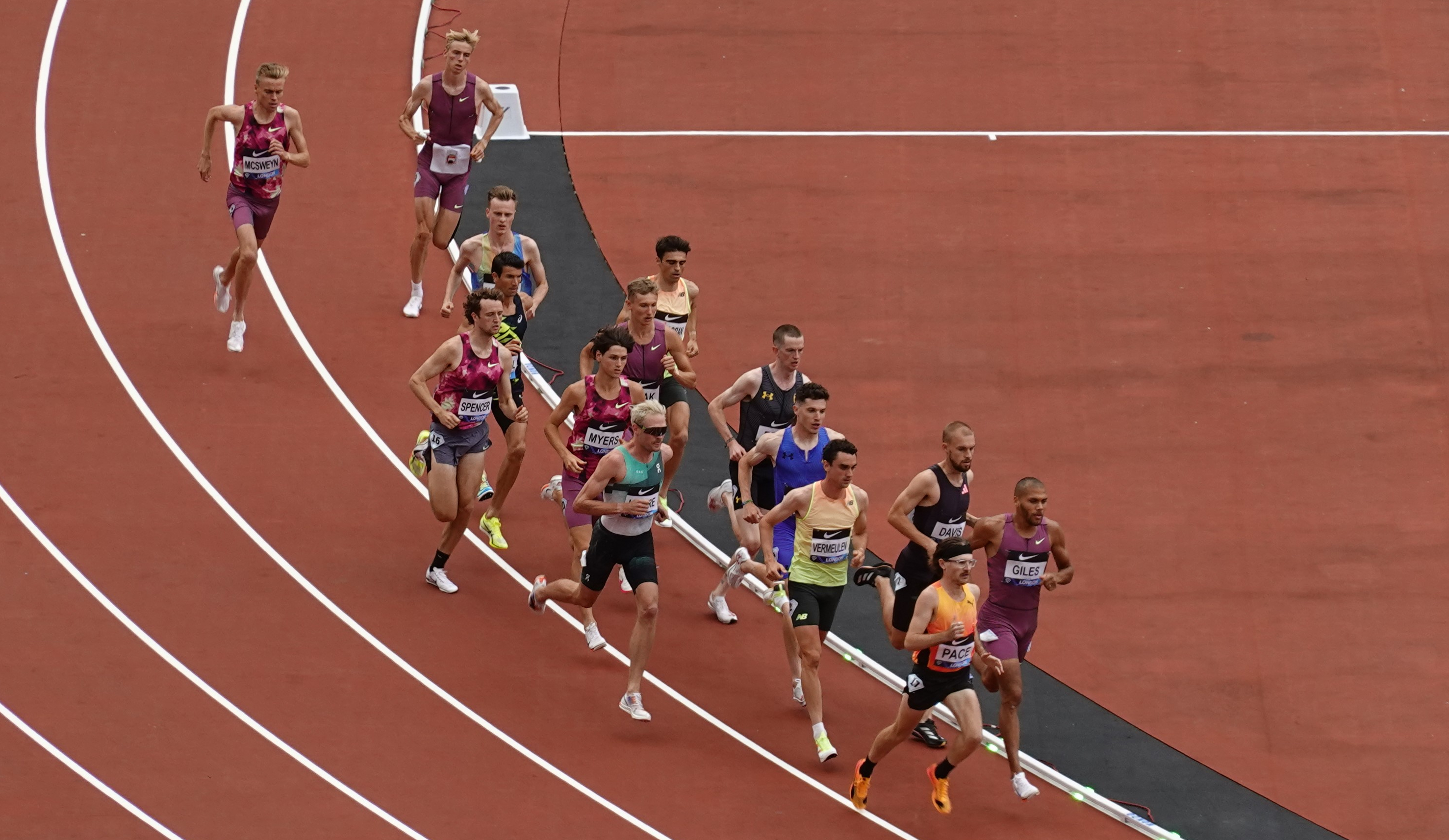
Athletes participating in the Men's mile race.

The 2024 London Athletics Meet was the 71st edition of the annual outdoor track and field meeting held in London. Held on 20 July at London Stadium, it was the tenth leg of the 2024 Diamond League – the highest level international track and field circuit.

The meeting was also the final Diamond League event before the 2024 Summer Olympics.

At the meeting, European records were set in the women's 800 m by Keely Hodgkinson and men's 400 m by Matthew Hudson-Smith.

== Results ==
Athletes competing in the Diamond League disciplines earned extra compensation and points which went towards qualifying for the 2024 Diamond League finals. First place earned 8 points, with each step down in place earning one less point than the previous, until no points are awarded in 9th place or lower. In the case of a tie, each tying athlete earns the full amount of points for the place.

=== Diamond Discipline ===
Men's 100 Metres (−0.3 m/s)
Place	Athlete	Age	Country	Time	Points
1st place, gold medalist(s)	Noah Lyles	27	United States	9.81	8
2nd place, silver medalist(s)	Akani Simbine	30	South Africa	9.86	7
3rd place, bronze medalist(s)	Letsile Tebogo	21	Botswana	9.88	6
4	Louie Hinchliffe	22	Great Britain	9.97	5
5	Ackeem Blake	22	Jamaica	9.97	4
6	Zharnel Hughes	29	Great Britain	10.00	3
7	Jeremiah Azu	23	Great Britain	10.08	2
8	Yohan Blake	34	Jamaica	10.23	1

Men's 400 Metres
Place	Athlete	Age	Country	Time	Points
1st place, gold medalist(s)	Matthew Hudson-Smith	29	Great Britain	43.74	8
2nd place, silver medalist(s)	Vernon Norwood	32	United States	44.10	7
3rd place, bronze medalist(s)	Jereem Richards	30	Trinidad and Tobago	44.18	6
4	Charlie Dobson	24	Great Britain	44.23	5
5	Kirani James	31	Grenada	44.38	4
6	Christopher Morales Williams	19	Canada	44.90	3
7	Bayapo Ndori	25	Botswana	45.03	2

Men's Mile (Emsley Carr Mile)
Place	Athlete	Age	Country	Time	Points
1st place, gold medalist(s)	Olli Hoare	27	Australia	3:49.03	8
2nd place, silver medalist(s)	Narve Gilje Nordås	25	Norway	3:49.06	7
3rd place, bronze medalist(s)	Adel Mechaal	33	Spain	3:49.21	6
4	Niels Laros	19	Netherlands	3:49.45	5
5	Stewart McSweyn	29	Australia	3:49.59	4
6	Cameron Myers	18	Australia	3:50.16	3
7	Adam Fogg	25	Great Britain	3:50.48	2
8	Andrew Coscoran	28	Ireland	3:50.49	1
9	Filip Rak	21	Poland	3:50.92	
10	Jochem Vermeulen	25	Belgium	3:51.00	
11	Elliot Giles	30	Great Britain	3:52.30	
12	Vincent Ciattei	29	United States	3:52.54	
13	Archie Davis	25	Great Britain	3:55.07	
14	Adam Spencer	22	Australia	3:55.49	
	Callum Davies	25	Australia	DNF	
	Neil Gourley	29	Great Britain	DNF	
	George Mills	25	Great Britain	DNF	

Men's 3000 Metres
Place	Athlete	Age	Country	Time	Points
1st place, gold medalist(s)	Dominic Lokinyomo Lobalu	25	Switzerland	7:27.68	8
2nd place, silver medalist(s)	Grant Fisher	27	United States	7:27.99	7
3rd place, bronze medalist(s)	Edwin Kurgat	28	Kenya	7:28.53	6
4	Telahun Haile Bekele	25	Ethiopia	7:30.80	5
5	Sean McGorty	29	United States	7:32.79	4
6	Cornelius Kemboi	24	Kenya	7:33.56	3
7	Brian Fay	25	Ireland	7:34.48	2
8	Emmanuel Korir Kiplagat	22	Kenya	7:34.59	1
9	Morgan Beadlescomb	26	United States	7:36.10	
10	Nick Griggs	19	Ireland	7:36.59	
11	Mike Foppen	27	Netherlands	7:37.12	
12	Jack Rowe	28	Great Britain	7:38.70	
13	Melkeneh Azize	19	Ethiopia	7:39.13	
14	Jonas Raess	30	Switzerland	7:40.30	
15	Gideon Kipkertich Rono	21	Kenya	7:41.76	
16	Scott Beattie	25	Great Britain	7:42.78	
17	Will Barnicoat	21	Great Britain	7:48.12	
18	Ellis Cross	27	Great Britain	7:48.45	
19	Rory Leonard	23	Great Britain	7:56.52	
	Jude Thomas	22	Australia	DNF	

Men's 400 Metres Hurdles
Place	Athlete	Age	Country	Time	Points
1st place, gold medalist(s)	Alison dos Santos	24	Brazil	47.18	8
2nd place, silver medalist(s)	Roshawn Clarke	20	Jamaica	47.63	7
3rd place, bronze medalist(s)	Ismail Abakar	20	Qatar	47.72	6
4	Kyron McMaster	27	British Virgin Islands	47.81	5
5	Wilfried Happio	25	France	48.26	4
6	CJ Allen	29	United States	48.49	3
7	Gerald Drummond	29	Costa Rica	48.89	2
8	Alastair Chalmers	24	Great Britain	49.52	1

Men's High Jump
Place	Athlete	Age	Country	Mark	Points
1st place, gold medalist(s)	Hamish Kerr	27	New Zealand	2.30 m	8
2nd place, silver medalist(s)	JuVaughn Harrison	25	United States	2.26 m	7
3rd place, bronze medalist(s)	William Grimsey	27	Great Britain	2.22 m	6
4	Jan Štefela	23	Czech Republic	2.22 m	5
5	Thomas Carmoy	24	Belgium	2.22 m	4
6	Norbert Kobielski	27	Poland	2.18 m	3

Men's Shot Put
Place	Athlete	Age	Country	Mark	Points
1st place, gold medalist(s)	Leonardo Fabbri	27	Italy	22.52 m	8
2nd place, silver medalist(s)	Ryan Crouser	31	United States	22.37 m	7
3rd place, bronze medalist(s)	Payton Otterdahl	28	United States	22.13 m	6
4	Joe Kovacs	35	United States	22.03 m	5
5	Jacko Gill	29	New Zealand	21.11 m	4
6	Tom Walsh	32	New Zealand	21.06 m	3
7	Scott Lincoln	31	Great Britain	20.71 m	2
8	Roger Steen	32	United States	20.15 m	1

Women's 200 Metres (−0.9 m/s)
Place	Athlete	Age	Country	Time	Points
1st place, gold medalist(s)	Gabrielle Thomas	27	United States	21.82	8
2nd place, silver medalist(s)	Julien Alfred	23	Saint Lucia	21.86	7
3rd place, bronze medalist(s)	Dina Asher-Smith	28	Great Britain	22.07	6
4	Daryll Neita	27	Great Britain	22.20	5
5	Rhasidat Adeleke	21	Ireland	22.35	4
6	Tamara Clark	25	United States	22.59	3
7	Jenna Prandini	31	United States	22.93	2
8	Amy Hunt	22	Great Britain	22.96	1

Women's 400 Metres
Place	Athlete	Age	Country	Time	Points
1st place, gold medalist(s)	Nickisha Pryce	23	Jamaica	48.57	8
2nd place, silver medalist(s)	Natalia Kaczmarek	26	Poland	48.90	7
3rd place, bronze medalist(s)	Lieke Klaver	25	Netherlands	49.58	6
4	Amber Anning	23	Great Britain	49.63	5
5	Laviai Nielsen	28	Great Britain	49.87	4
6	Lynna Irby	25	United States	50.71	3
7	Victoria Ohuruogu	31	Great Britain	50.76	2
8	Talitha Diggs	21	United States	52.47	1

Women's 800 Metres
Place	Athlete	Age	Country	Time	Points
1st place, gold medalist(s)	Keely Hodgkinson	22	Great Britain	1:54.61	8
2nd place, silver medalist(s)	Jemma Reekie	26	Great Britain	1:55.61	7
3rd place, bronze medalist(s)	Georgia Bell	30	Great Britain	1:56.28	6
4	Natoya Goule	33	Jamaica	1:56.83	5
5	Rénelle Lamote	30	France	1:57.06	4
6	Halimah Nakaayi	29	Uganda	1:57.26	3
7	Allie Wilson	28	United States	1:57.52	2
8	Laura Muir	31	Great Britain	1:57.63	1
9	Catriona Bisset	30	Australia	1:58.12	
10	Elena Bellò	27	Italy	1:58.89	
	Erin Wallace	24	Great Britain	DNF	

Women's 400 Metres Hurdles
Place	Athlete	Age	Country	Time	Points
1st place, gold medalist(s)	Femke Bol	24	Netherlands	51.30	8
2nd place, silver medalist(s)	Shamier Little	29	United States	52.78	7
3rd place, bronze medalist(s)	Rushell Clayton	31	Jamaica	53.24	6
4	Andrenette Knight	27	Jamaica	53.69	5
5	Jessie Knight	30	Great Britain	54.15	4
6	Cathelijn Peeters	27	Netherlands	54.50	3
7	Shiann Salmon	25	Jamaica	54.50	2
8	Lina Nielsen	28	Great Britain	54.65	1

Women's Pole Vault
Place	Athlete	Age	Country	Mark	Points
1st place, gold medalist(s)	Nina Kennedy	27	Australia	4.85 m	8
2nd place, silver medalist(s)	Alysha Newman	30	Canada	4.75 m	7
3rd place, bronze medalist(s)	Molly Caudery	24	Great Britain	4.65 m	6
3rd place, bronze medalist(s)	Sandi Morris	32	United States	4.65 m	6
5	Eliza McCartney	27	New Zealand	4.65 m	4
5	Angelica Moser	26	Switzerland	4.65 m	4
7	Roberta Bruni	30	Italy	4.65 m	2
8	Katie Moon	33	United States	4.50 m	1
	Olivia McTaggart	24	New Zealand	NM	

Women's Long Jump
Place	Athlete	Age	Country	Mark	Points
1st place, gold medalist(s)	Malaika Mihambo	30	Germany	6.87 m (−0.1 m/s)	8
2nd place, silver medalist(s)	Agate de Sousa	24	Portugal	6.75 m (+1.1 m/s)	7
3rd place, bronze medalist(s)	Larissa Iapichino	22	Italy	6.70 m (−0.2 m/s)	6
4	Milica Gardašević	25	Serbia	6.58 m (+0.7 m/s)	5
5	Katarina Johnson-Thompson	31	Great Britain	6.54 m (+0.5 m/s)	4
6	Tiffany Flynn	28	United States	6.50 m (+1.4 m/s)	3
7	Yanis David	26	France	6.28 m (+0.9 m/s)	2
8	Yue Ya Xin	26	Hong Kong	6.24 m (+0.2 m/s)	1

Women's Javelin Throw
Place	Athlete	Age	Country	Mark	Points
1st place, gold medalist(s)	Mackenzie Little	27	Australia	66.27 m	8
2nd place, silver medalist(s)	Adriana Vilagoš	20	Serbia	65.58 m	7
3rd place, bronze medalist(s)	Maggie Malone-Hardin	30	United States	62.99 m	6
4	Haruka Kitaguchi	26	Japan	62.69 m	5
5	Tori Peeters	30	New Zealand	60.43 m	4
6	Victoria Hudson	28	Austria	60.35 m	3
7	Līna Mūze	31	Latvia	60.33 m	2
8	Rebekah Walton	24	Great Britain	52.19 m	1

=== Promotional events ===
Men's 4×100 Metres Relay
Place	Athlete	Age	Country	Time
1st place, gold medalist(s)	Ryuichiro Sakai; Hiroki Yanagita; Yoshihide Kiryū; Koki Ueyama		Japan	38.07
2nd place, silver medalist(s)	Sebastian Sultana; Jacob Despard; Calab Law; Joshua Azzopardi		Australia	38.31
3rd place, bronze medalist(s)	CJ Ujah; Jeriel Quainoo; Nethaneel Mitchell-Blake; Eugene Amo-Dadzie		Great Britain	38.32
4	Eliezer Adjibi; Duan Asemota; Brendon Rodney; Jerome Blake		Canada	38.35
5	Elvis Afrifa; Taymir Burnet; Xavi Mo-Ajok; Nsikak Ekpo		Netherlands	38.55
6	Ryan Zeze; Harold Achi-Yao; Pablo Matéo; Méba-Mickaël Zeze		France	38.56
	Jeremiah Azu; Louie Hinchliffe; Richard Kilty; Reece Prescod		Great Britain	DNF

Women's 4×100 Metres Relay
Place	Athlete	Age	Country	Time
1st place, gold medalist(s)	Dina Asher-Smith; Imani-Lara Lansiquot; Amy Hunt; Daryll Neita		Great Britain	41.55
2nd place, silver medalist(s)	Orlann Oliere; Sarah Richard; Hélène Parisot; Chloé Galet		France	42.10
3rd place, bronze medalist(s)	Bianca Williams; Desirèe Henry; Joy Eze; Success Eduan		Great Britain	42.46
4	Ella Connolly; Bree Masters; Kristie Edwards; Torrie Lewis		Australia	42.48
5	Isabel van den Berg; Marije van Hunenstijn; Minke Bisschops; Tasa Jiya		Netherlands	42.50
6	Salomé Kora; Léonie Pointet; Géraldine Frey; Emma van Camp		Switzerland	42.71
	Sade McCreath; Jacqueline Madogo; Marie-Éloise Leclair; Audrey Leduc		Canada	DNF

=== National events ===
Men's 100 Metres (+2.1 m/s)
Place	Athlete	Age	Country	Time
1st place, gold medalist(s)	Eugene Amo-Dadzie	32	Great Britain	10.12
2nd place, silver medalist(s)	Reece Prescod	28	Great Britain	10.14
3rd place, bronze medalist(s)	CJ Ujah	30	Great Britain	10.14
4	Ojie Edoburun	28	Great Britain	10.18
5	Dylan Vermont	24	France	10.31
6	David Morgan-Harrison	22	Great Britain	10.36
7	Jeriel Quainoo	21	Great Britain	10.42
8	Onyema Adigida	24	Netherlands	10.43

Men's 400 Metres
Place	Athlete	Age	Country	Time
1st place, gold medalist(s)	Samuel Reardon	20	Great Britain	44.70
2nd place, silver medalist(s)	Alex Haydock-Wilson	24	Great Britain	45.37
3rd place, bronze medalist(s)	Bailey Swift	22	Great Britain	45.70
4	Lewis Davey	23	Great Britain	45.80
5	Joe Brier	25	Great Britain	45.83
6	Rio Mitcham	24	Great Britain	45.87
7	Toby Harries	25	Great Britain	46.02
8	Alex Knibbs	25	Great Britain	46.17

Women's 100 Metres (+1.1 m/s)
Place	Athlete	Age	Country	Time
1st place, gold medalist(s)	Imani-Lara Lansiquot	26	Great Britain	11.12
2nd place, silver medalist(s)	Desirèe Henry	28	Great Britain	11.22
3rd place, bronze medalist(s)	Bianca Williams	30	Great Britain	11.29
4	Nia Wedderburn-Goodison	19	Great Britain	11.33
5	Joy Eze	20	Great Britain	11.35
6	Finette Agyapong	27	Great Britain	11.42
7	Alyson Bell	20	Great Britain	11.46
8	Success Eduan	19	Great Britain	11.48

Women's 400 Metres
Place	Athlete	Age	Country	Time
1st place, gold medalist(s)	Yemi Mary John	21	Great Britain	51.18
2nd place, silver medalist(s)	Nicole Yeargin	26	Great Britain	51.64
3rd place, bronze medalist(s)	Ama Pipi	28	Great Britain	51.87
4	Jodie Williams	30	Great Britain	52.06
5	Poppy Malik	20	Great Britain	52.23
6	Hannah Kelly	23	Great Britain	52.30
7	Hannah Brier	26	Great Britain	52.94
8	Emily Newnham	20	Great Britain	53.48

=== U18 events ===
Men's 4×100 Metres Relay
Place	Athlete	Age	Country	Time
1st place, gold medalist(s)			Great Britain	41.70

Women's 4×100 Metres Relay
Place	Athlete	Age	Country	Time
1st place, gold medalist(s)			Great Britain	47.93
2nd place, silver medalist(s)			Great Britain	48.35

=== Other ===
Men's High Jump
Place	Athlete	Age	Country	Mark
	Mutaz Barsham	33	Qatar	DNS

== See also ==
- 2024 Diamond League
