= 2022 World Athletics U20 Championships – Women's 4 × 100 metres relay =

Women's 4 × 100 metres relay at the 2022 World Athletics U20 Championships
- Venue: Estadio Olímpico Pascual Guerrero
- Dates: 4 August (heats); 5 August (final)
- Competitors: 76 from 18 nations
- Winning time: 42.59

Medalists
gold medal	Serena Cole; Tina Clayton; Kerrica Hill; Tia Clayton; Alexis James*	Jamaica
silver medal	Jayla Jamison; Autumn Wilson; Iyana Gray; Shawnti Jackson; Lily Jones*; Alyssa Colbert*	United States
bronze medal	María Alejandra Murillo; Marlet Ospino; Melany Bolaño; Laura Martínez	Colombia

The women's 4 × 100 metres relay at the 2022 World Athletics U20 Championships was held at the Estadio Olímpico Pascual Guerrero in Cali, Colombia on 4 and 5 August 2022.

== Records ==
Standing records prior to the 2022 World Athletics U20 Championships
World U20 Record	Jamaica	42.94	Nairobi, Kenya	22 August 2021
Championship Record	Jamaica	42.94	Nairobi, Kenya	22 August 2021
World U20 Leading	United States	42.40	Walnut, United States	16 April 2022

== Results ==
=== Heats ===
Qualification: First 2 of each heat ( Q ) plus the 2 fastest times ( q ) qualified for the final.

Rank	Heat	Nation	Athletes	Time	Notes
1	1	Jamaica	Serena Cole, Tina Clayton, Alexis James, Tia Clayton	43.28	Q
2	2	United States	Lily Jones, Autumn Wilson, Iyana Gray, Alyssa Colbert	43.66	Q, SB
3	3	Great Britain	Nia Wedderburn-Goodison, Alyson Bell, Joy Eze, Faith Akinbileje	43.78	Q, NU20R
4	3	Colombia	María Alejandra Murillo, Marlet Ospino, Melany Bolaño, Laura Martínez	44.34 [.332]	Q, NU20R
5	3	Germany	Chelsea Kadiri, Sina Kammerschmitt, Marlene Körner, Holly Okuku	44.34 [.338]	q
6	1	Italy	Gaya Bertello, Ludovica Galuppi, Agnese Musica, Ilenia Angelini	44.69	Q, SB
7	2	Australia	Aleksandra Stoilova, Olivia Rose Inkster, Hayley Reynolds, Taylah Cruttenden	44.83	Q, SB
8	2	Switzerland	Soraya Becerra, Emma Van Camp, Selina Furler, Anouk Ledermann	44.94 [.940]	q, SB
8	3	Czech Republic	Eva Kubíčková, Tereza Lamačová, Adéla Tkáčová, Hana Blažková	44.94 [.940]	SB
10	2	Poland	Dorota Puzio, Aleksandra Piotrowska, Julia Dziamska, Magdalena Niemczyk	45.14	SB
11	1	France	Maïwenn L'Heveder, Lauraline Lerus, Shana Lambourde, Maud Zeffou Poaty	45.20	SB
12	1	South Africa	Nosipho Malinga, Kayla La Grange, Kayla Murray, Natasha Gertenbach	45.84	SB
13	1	Puerto Rico	Legna Echevarria, Frances Colón, Darelis Dominguez, Karina Franceschi	46.12	NU20R
14	1	Trinidad and Tobago	Reneisha Andrews, Shaniqua Bascombe, Kayla Caesar, Kyah La Fortune	46.44	
15	1	Bahamas	Shatalya Dorsett, Lacarthea Cooper, Paige Archer, Javonya Valcourt	46.51	SB
	2	Finland	Minea Fogelholm, Anna Pursiainen, Emma Tainio, Katriina Wright	DQ	TR24.7
	3	Nigeria	Adijatu Rejoice Sule, Praise Ofoku, Adetutu Funmilayo Aladeloye, Obi Jennifer Chukwuka	DQ	TR24.6
	3	Brazil	Ana Cecília Correia de Oliveira, Natalia Campregher, Vanessa Sena, Leticia Ruzilla	DQ	TR24.7
	2	Canada		DNS	

=== Final ===
The final was held on 5 August at 18:37.

Rank	Nation	Athletes	Time	Notes
1st place, gold medalist(s)	Jamaica	Serena Cole, Tina Clayton, Kerrica Hill, Tia Clayton	42.59	WU20R
2nd place, silver medalist(s)	United States	Jayla Jamison, Autumn Wilson, Iyana Gray, Shawnti Jackson	43.28	NU20R
3rd place, bronze medalist(s)	Colombia	María Alejandra Murillo, Marlet Ospino, Melany Bolaño, Laura Martínez	44.59	
4	Germany	Chelsea Kadiri, Sina Kammerschmitt, Marlene Körner, Holly Okuku	44.73	
5	Italy	Gaya Bertello, Ludovica Galuppi, Agnese Musica, Ilenia Angelini	44.79	
6	Australia	Hayley Reynolds, Olivia Rose Inkster, Georgia Harris, Taylah Cruttenden	45.15	
	Great Britain	Nia Wedderburn-Goodison, Alyson Bell, Joy Eze, Faith Akinbileje	DNF	
	Switzerland	Soraya Becerra, Emma Van Camp, Selina Furler, Anouk Ledermann	DQ	TR24.7
