= 2025 European Athletics U23 Championships – Women's 200 metres =

Women's 200 metres at the 2025 European Athletics U23 Championships
- Venue: Fana Stadion
- Location: Bergen, Norway
- Dates: 18 July (heats); 19 July (semi-finals & final)
- Competitors: 28 from 18 nations
- Winning time: 22.74

Medalists
| gold medal | Success Eduan | Great Britain |
| silver medal | Henriette Jæger | Norway |
| bronze medal | Nora Lindahl | Sweden |

The women's 200 metres event at the 2025 European Athletics U23 Championships was held in Bergen, Norway, at Fana Stadion on 18 and 19 July.

== Records ==
Prior to the competition, the records were as follows:

| Record | Athlete (nation) | Time (s) | Location | Date |
|---|---|---|---|---|
| European U23 record | Marita Koch (GDR) | 21.71 | Karl Marx Stadt, East Germany | 10 June 1979 |
| Championship U23 record | Hana Benešová (SVK) | 22.57 | Turku, Finland | 13 July 1997 |

== Results ==
=== Heats ===
First 3 in each heat (Q) and the next 4 fastest (q) qualified for the semi-finals.

==== Heat 1 ====
| Place | Athlete | Nation | Time | Notes |
|---|---|---|---|---|
| 1 | Henriette Jæger | Norway | 23.35 | Q |
| 2 | Alyson Bell | Great Britain | 23.61 | Q |
| 3 | Britt de Blaauw | Netherlands | 23.92 | Q |
| 4 | Lina Hribar | Slovenia | 24.09 | |
| 5 | Ivana Peralta | Spain | 24.23 | |
| 6 | Katja Luukkola | Finland | 24.58 | |
| 7 | Ioana-Adnana Vrînceanu | Romania | 24.63 | |
| | | | Wind: (−2.0 m/s) | |

==== Heat 2 ====
| Place | Athlete | Nation | Time | Notes |
|---|---|---|---|---|
| 1 | Magdalena Niemczyk | Poland | 23.48 | Q |
| 2 | Holly Okuku | Germany | 23.50 | Q |
| 3 | Kissiwaa Mensah | Great Britain | 23.51 | Q, SB |
| 4 | Lia Thalmann | Switzerland | 24.04 | |
| 5 | Agáta Cellerová | Slovakia | 24.10 | |
| 6 | Alessandra Gasparelli | San Marino | 24.54 | |
| — | Lucija Potnik | Slovenia | DQ | TR 16.8 |
| | | | Wind: (−2.3 m/s) | |

==== Heat 3 ====
| Place | Athlete | Nation | Time | Notes |
|---|---|---|---|---|
| 1 | Fabienne Hoenke | Switzerland | 23.42 | Q |
| 2 | Polyniki Emmanouilidou | Greece | 23.55 | Q |
| 3 | Sila Koloğlu | Turkey | 23.73 | Q |
| 4 | Alexa Sulyán | Hungary | 23.75 | q |
| 5 | Emma Tainio | Finland | 23.83 | q |
| 6 | Chiara Goffi | Italy | 24.28 | |
| 7 | Lurdes Oliveira | Portugal | 24.69 | |
| | | | Wind: (−2.2 m/s) | |

==== Heat 4 ====
| Place | Athlete | Nation | Time | Notes |
|---|---|---|---|---|
| 1 | Success Eduan | Great Britain | 23.12 | Q |
| 2 | Iris Caligiuri | Switzerland | 23.30 | Q |
| 3 | Nora Lindahl | Sweden | 23.44 | Q |
| 4 | Maren Bakke Amundsen | Norway | 23.66 | q, SB |
| 5 | Simay Özçiftçi | Turkey | 23.89 | q |
| 6 | Inga Kanicka | Poland | 23.96 | |
| 7 | Maria Bisericescu | Romania | 24.39 | |
| | | | Wind: (−1.6 m/s) | |

=== Semi-finals ===
First 3 in each heat (Q) and the next 2 fastest (q) qualified for the final.

==== Heat 1 ====
| Place | Athlete | Nation | Time | Notes |
|---|---|---|---|---|
| 1 | Success Eduan | Great Britain | 22.90 | Q |
| 2 | Nora Lindahl | Sweden | 23.15 | Q |
| 3 | Magdalena Niemczyk | Poland | 23.31 | Q |
| 4 | Iris Caligiuri | Switzerland | 23.26 | q |
| 5 | Alyson Bell | Great Britain | 23.59 | |
| 6 | Maren Bakke Amundsen | Norway | 23.70 | |
| 7 | Britt de Blaauw | Netherlands | 24.10 | |
| 8 | Simay Özçiftçi | Turkey | 24.19 | |
| | | | Wind: (−1.3 m/s) | |

==== Heat 2 ====
| Place | Athlete | Nation | Time | Notes |
|---|---|---|---|---|
| 1 | Henriette Jæger | Norway | 23.04 | Q |
| 2 | Holly Okuku | Germany | 23.23 | Q |
| 3 | Polyniki Emmanouilidou | Greece | 23.30 | Q |
| 4 | Fabienne Hoenke | Switzerland | 23.36 | qD |
| 4 | Kissiwaa Mensah | Great Britain | 23.36 | |
| 6 | Sila Koloğlu | Turkey | 23.62 | |
| 7 | Alexa Sulyán | Hungary | 23.72 | |
| 8 | Emma Tainio | Finland | 24.04 | |
| | | | Wind: (−1.5 m/s) | |

=== Final ===
| Place | Athlete | Nation | Time | Notes |
|---|---|---|---|---|
| 1 | Success Eduan | Great Britain | 22.74 | SB |
| 2 | Henriette Jæger | Norway | 22.78 | SB |
| 3 | Nora Lindahl | Sweden | 22.92 | SB |
| 4 | Fabienne Hoenke | Switzerland | 23.36 | |
| 5 | Iris Caligiuri | Switzerland | 23.16 | PB |
| 6 | Polyniki Emmanouilidou | Greece | 23.25 | |
| 7 | Magdalena Niemczyk | Poland | 23.29 | |
| 8 | Holly Okuku | Germany | 23.32 | |
| | | | Wind: (−0.7 m/s) | |
