= Jolina Ernst =

German sprinter (born 2004)

Personal information
- Born: 4 June 2004 (age 22)

Sport
- Sport: Athletics
- Event: Sprint
Medal record
Women's athletics
Representing Germany
European U23 Championships
Bronze medal – third place	2025 Bergen	4 × 100 m relay
World University Games
Bronze medal – third place	2025 Bochum	4 × 100 m relay

Jolina Ernst (born 4 June 2004) is a German sprinter. She won the German Athletics Championships in 2026 over 100 metres.

== Biography ==
A member of TV Wattenscheid, her parents Melanie Paschke and Andre Ernst were both sprinters. In July 2025, she won a bronze medal with the German team in the 4 × 100 metres relay, at the 2025 European Athletics U23 Championships in Bergen, Norway alongside Viola John, Holly Okuku and Chelsea Kadiri. She also won a bronze medal representing Germany at the 2025 World University Games in Germany.

In February 2026, she placed third over 60 metres at the German Indoor Athletics Championships. In May 2026, was named in the German team for the 2026 World Athletics Relays in Gaborone, Botswana, and ran the opening leg of the women's 4 × 100 metres final as the German team placed sixth overall. In July 2026, she won the 100 metres title at the German Championships, with a personal best time of 11.26 seconds. The following month, she represented Germany at the 2026 European Athletics Championships in Birmingham, England. In September, she was named in the German relay team for the 2026 World Ultimate Championship in Budapest.
