= 2025 European Athletics U23 Championships – Women's 4 × 100 metres relay =

Women's 4 × 100 metres relay at the 2025 European Athletics U23 Championships
- Venue: Fana Stadion
- Location: Bergen, Norway
- Dates: 20 July
- Competitors: 45 from 13 nations
- Winning time: 42.92 CR, SB

Medalists
gold medal	Nia Wedderburn-Goodison; Kissiwaa Mensah; Alyson Bell; Success Eduan; Faith Akinbileje; Joy Eze	Great Britain
silver medal	Chloé Rabac; Emma van Camp; Fabienne Hoenke; Soraya Becerra; Iris Caligiuri	Switzerland
bronze medal	Viola John; Holly Okuku; Jolina Ernst; Chelsea Kadiri	Germany

The women's 4 × 100 metres relay event at the 2025 European Athletics U23 Championships was held in Bergen, Norway, at Fana Stadion on 20 July.

== Records ==
Prior to the competition, the records were as follows:

Record	Nation	Time (s)	Location	Date
European U23 record	East Germany (GDR)	42.09	Turin, Italy	4 August 1979
Championship U23 record	Great Britain (GBR)	43.04	Espoo, Finland	15 July 2023

== Results ==
=== Heats ===
First 3 in each heat (Q) and the next 2 fastest (q) advance to the final.

==== Heat 1 ====
Place	Nation	Athletes	Time	Notes
1	Great Britain	Faith Akinbileje, Kissiwaa Mensah, Alyson Bell, Joy Eze	43.07	Q, SB
2	Poland	Aleksandra Piotrowska, Inga Kanicka, Magdalena Niemczyk, Emilia Wójtowicz	43.48	Q, NU23R
3	Netherlands	Alyshia Kavehercy, Britt de Blaauw, Fenna Achterberg, Isabel van den Berg	43.94	Q, SB
4	Spain	Carla Cruz, Elena Guiu, Ivana Peralta, Ericka Badeau Maseras	44.02	q, SB
5	Portugal	Rita Barbosa, Beatriz Castelhano, Lurdes Oliveira, Joana Dias	44.21	q, NU23R
6	Lithuania	Neda Lasickaitė, Gabija Klimukaitė, Andre Ožechauskaite, Ema Rupšytė	45.34	SB
7	Slovenia	Lana Andolšek, Lina Hribar, Katjuša Jordan Nadižar, Lucija Potnik	45.93	

==== Heat 2 ====
Place	Nation	Athletes	Time	Notes
1	Switzerland	Chloé Rabac, Emma van Camp, Iris Caligiuri, Soraya Becerra	43.47	Q, NU23R
2	Germany	Viola John, Holly Okuku, Jolina Ernst, Chelsea Kadiri	43.62	Q, SB
3	France	Nina Thevenin, Amandine Estival, Romane Colletin, Grâce Tade	44.30	Q, SB
4	Turkey	Büşra Akay, Sila Koloğlu, Simay Özçiftçi, Beyzanur Seylan	44.42	NR
5	Italy	Gaya Bertello, Rachele Torchio, Chiara Goffi, Amanda Ugochinyere Obijiaku	44.64	SB
—	Finland	Priscilla Boateng, Anna Pursiainen, Emma Tainio, Katja Luukkola	DNF	

=== Final ===
Place	Nation	Athletes	Time	Notes
1st place, gold medalist(s)	Nia Wedderburn-Goodison, Kissiwaa Mensah, Alyson Bell, Success Eduan	Great Britain	42.92	CR, SB
2nd place, silver medalist(s)	Chloé Rabac, Emma van Camp, Fabienne Hoenke, Soraya Becerra	Switzerland	43.39	NU23R
3rd place, bronze medalist(s)	Viola John, Holly Okuku, Jolina Ernst, Chelsea Kadiri	Germany	43.75	
4	Alyshia Kavehercy, Britt de Blaauw, Fenna Achterberg, Isabel van den Berg	Netherlands	44.11	
5	Carla Cruz, Elena Guiu, Ivana Peralta, Ericka Badeau Maseras	Spain	44.27	
6	Rita Barbosa, Beatriz Castelhano, Lurdes Oliveira, Joana Dias	Portugal	44.62	
7	Nina Thevenin, Amandine Estival, Romane Colletin, Grâce Tade	France	44.81	
—	Aleksandra Piotrowska, Inga Kanicka, Magdalena Niemczyk, Emilia Wójtowicz	Poland	DQ	
