= Kissiwaa Mensah =

British sprinter (born 2005)

Personal information
- Born: 24 July 2005 (age 20)

Sport
- Sport: Athletics
- Event: Sprint

Achievements and titles
- Personal best(s): 60m: 7.39 (2024); 100m: 11.58 (2024); 200m: 23.19 (2024)
Medal record
Women's athletics
Representing Great Britain
World Relays
Bronze medal – third place	2025 Guangzhou	mixed 4×100 m relay
European U23 Championships
Gold medal – first place	2025 Bergen	4x100m relay

Kissiwaa Mensah (born 24 July 2005) is a British sprinter. She was a bronze medalist running for Great Britain in the mixed 4 x 100 metres at the 2025 World Athletics Relays.

== Biography ==
Mensah competed for Great Britain at the 2024 World Athletics U20 Championships in Lima, Peru.

Mensah finished runner-up to Alyson Bell in the final of the 200 metres at the 2025 British Indoor Athletics Championships in Birmingham, on 23 February 2025. She was named in the British team for the 2025 World Athletics Relays in Guangzhou. She made her senior international debut racing in the mixed 4 x 100 metres relay, alongside Joe Ferguson, Nia Wedderburn-Goodison and Jeriel Quainoo as the British quartet finished second in their heat to qualify for the final. They won bronze in the final with Asha Philip coming into the team for Wedderburn-Goodison.

Mensah was named in the British team for the 2025 European Athletics U23 Championships in Bergen, winning a gold medal as part of the women’s 4 x 100 metres relay team which won in a championship record time of 42.92 seconds. In October 2025, she was named on the British Athletics Olympic Futures Programme for 2025/26.

Mensah was named in the British squad for the 4 x 100 metres relay at the 2026 World Athletics Relays in Gaborone, Botswana. On the opening day of the competition, she anchored the mixed 4 x 100 m relay team as they qualified for the final. On 21 June, Mensah placed sixth in the final of the 200 metres at the 2026 UK Athletics Championships in Birmingham.
