= Ethan Wiltshire =

British athlete (born 2002)

Personal information
- Full name: Ethan Harbias-Wiltshire
- Nationality: British (English)
- Born: 29 June 2002 (age 24)

Sport
- Sport: Athletics
- Event: Sprint

Achievements and titles
- Personal best(s): 60m: 6.80 (2025); 100m: 10.33 (2021); 200m: 20.51 (2025)
Medal record
Men's athletics
Representing Great Britain
European U20 Championships
Gold medal – first place	2021 Tallinn	4x100m relay

Ethan Harbias-Wiltshire (born 29 June 2002) is a British sprinter. He won a gold medal at the 2021 European Athletics U20 Championships in the 4 × 100 m relay.

== Biography ==
Wiltshire won the silver medal over 60 metres at the 2019 England Athletics U20 Indoor Championships in Sheffield, running his heat and semi-final in 7.00 and 6.97 seconds respectively before running a lifetime best 6.92 seconds in the final. He was subsequently selected for the England U20 team to compete in the Welsh International Games in Cardiff, where he placed third with a time of 6.95 seconds.

Wiltshire won a gold medal at the 2021 European Athletics U20 Championships in the 4 × 100 m relay, running alongside Joseph Harding, Jeriel Quainoo and Toby Makoyawo for a time of 39.74 seconds in Tallinn. He also ran in the individual 100 metres, reaching the final with a personal best 10.34 seconds and placing fourth overall with an improved time of 10.33 seconds.

Wiltshire placed third over 200 metres at the 2025 UK Athletics Championships behind Zharnel Hughes and Jona Efoloko, running 20.51 seconds, a new lifetime best.

Wiltshire was named in the British squad for the 4 x 100 metres relay at the 2026 World Athletics Relays in Gaborone, Botswana.
