= Tallinn 2021 =

Tallinn 2021 may refer to:

- 2021 European Athletics U23 Championships
- 2021 European Athletics U20 Championships
