= 2024 World Athletics U20 Championships – Women's 100 metres =

Sporting event

Women's 100 metres at the 2024 World Athletics U20 Championships
- Venue: Estadio Atlético de la VIDENA
- Dates: 27 August 2024 (heats & semi-finals); 28 August 2024 (final)
- Competitors: 49 from 36 nations
- Winning time: 11.17

Medalists
gold medal	Alana Reid	Jamaica
silver medal	Adaejah Hodge	British Virgin Islands
bronze medal	Kishawna Niles	Barbados

The women's 100 metres at the 2024 World Athletics U20 Championships was held at the Estadio Atlético de la VIDENA in Lima, Peru on 27 and 28 August 2024.

== Records ==
U20 standing records prior to the 2024 World Athletics U20 Championships were as follows:

Record	Athlete & Nationality	Mark	Location	Date
World U20 Record	Marlies Oelsner (GDR)	10.88	Dresden, Germany	1 July 1977
Championship Record	Tina Clayton (JAM)	10.95	Cali, Colombia	3 August 2022
World U20 Leading	Alana Reid (JAM)	11.09	Gainesville, United States	13 April 2024

== Results ==
=== Heats ===
The first 3 athletes in each heat (Q) and the next 6 fastest (q) qualified to the semi-finals.

==== Heat 1 ====
Rank	Lane	Athlete	Nation	Time	Notes
1	9	Adaejah Hodge	British Virgin Islands	11.45	Q
2	2	Kishawna Niles	Barbados	11.63	Q
3	4	Uliana Stepaniuk	Ukraine	11.82	Q
4	8	Lina Hribar	Slovenia	11.95 (.948)	
5	6	Abinaya Rajarajan	India	11.95 (.950)	
6	7	Athaleyha Hinckson	Guyana	12.01	
7	5	Rachele Torchio	Italy	12.05	
8	3	Carla Martínez	Spain	12.08	
				Wind: -0.2 m/s	

==== Heat 2 ====
Rank	Lane	Athlete	Nation	Time	Notes
1	7	Mabel Akande	Great Britain	11.53	Q
2	2	Radina Velichkova	Bulgaria	11.57	Q
3	5	Justina Eyakpobeyan	Nigeria	11.61	Q
4	9	Olivia Lundberg	Sweden	11.63	q
5	8	Lucija Potnik	Slovenia	11.71	q, SB
6	6	Sherin Kimuanga	Germany	11.75	q
7	3	Kaili Botje	South Africa	11.92	
8	4	Antonia Ramírez	Chile	12.15	
				Wind: +0.2 m/s	

==== Heat 3 ====
Rank	Lane	Athlete	Nation	Time	Notes
1	4	Alana Reid	Jamaica	11.46	Q
2	8	Chelsea Kadiri	Germany	11.51	Q
3	6	Taylor Snaer	United States	11.58	Q
4	5	Jagoda Żukowska	Poland	11.79	q
5	2	Renée Tedga	Canada	11.89	
6	7	Jazmin Romeu	Spain	12.15	
7	9	Shayann Demeritte	Bahamas	12.19	
8	3	Casey Cruz	Northern Mariana Islands	13.59	
9	1	Emma Bottin	Monaco	13.64	
				Wind: -0.6 m/s	

==== Heat 4 ====
Rank	Lane	Athlete	Nation	Time	Notes
1	5	Viwe Jingqi	South Africa	11.61	Q
2	2	Chen Yujie	China	11.66	Q
3	7	Liranyi Alonso	Dominican Republic	11.77	Q
4	3	Marielle Venida	New Zealand	11.80	
5	4	Frederikke Voss Vestergaard	Denmark	12.03	
6	6	Chioma Nweke	Nigeria	12.24	
7	8	Katharina Stadler	Austria	12.25	
8	9	Chelsea Scoyler	Australia	29.06	
				Wind: -0.5 m/s	

==== Heat 5 ====
Rank	Lane	Athlete	Nation	Time	Notes
1	8	Chloé Rabac	Switzerland	11.77	Q
2	7	Frances Colón	Puerto Rico	11.83	Q
3	2	Avery Lewis	United States	11.85	Q
4	4	Thieanna Terrelonge	Jamaica	12.03	
5	6	Agnese Musica	Italy	12.07	
6	5	María Maturana	Colombia	12.08	
7	1	Oliwia Zimoląg	Poland	12.23	
8	3	Mariyam Ru Ya Ali	Maldives	12.47	
–	9	Zinad Joseph	ART	DNS	
				Wind: -0.6 m/s	

==== Heat 6 ====
Rank	Lane	Athlete	Nation	Time	Notes
1	7	Nia Wedderburn-Goodison	Great Britain	11.47	Q
2	5	Aleksandra Stoilova	Australia	11.56	Q
3	6	Miia Ott	Estonia	11.69	Q
4	8	Savannah Blair	Canada	11.78	q
5	2	Vanessa Sena	Brazil	11.79	q
6	3	Nina Thevenin	France	11.92	
7	9	Stefany Julio	Colombia	12.01	
8	4	Cayetana Chirinos	Peru	12.17	
				Wind: -0.4 m/s	

=== Semi-finals ===
The first 2 athletes in each heat (Q) and the next 2 fastest (q) qualified to the final.

==== Heat 1 ====
Rank	Lane	Athlete	Nation	Time	Notes
1	4	Kishawna Niles	Barbados	11.39 (.389)	Q
2	7	Nia Wedderburn-Goodison	Great Britain	11.39 (.389)	Q
3	6	Viwe Jingqi	South Africa	11.49	q
4	5	Radina Velichkova	Bulgaria	11.68	
5	2	Sherin Kimuanga	Germany	11.76	
6	8	Miia Ott	Estonia	11.84	
7	9	Savannah Blair	Canada	11.87	
8	3	Liranyi Alonso	Dominican Republic	11.89	
				Wind: +0.5 m/s	

==== Heat 2 ====
Rank	Lane	Athlete	Nation	Time	Notes
1	4	Alana Reid	Jamaica	11.44	Q
2	3	Justina Eyakpobeyan	Nigeria	11.56	Q
3	5	Aleksandra Stoilova	Australia	11.58	q
4	6	Mabel Akande	Great Britain	11.59	
5	9	Lucija Potnik	Slovenia	11.72	
6	8	Avery Lewis	United States	11.77	
7	7	Chen Yujie	China	11.79	
8	2	Jagoda Żukowska	Poland	11.98	
				Wind: -0.3 m/s	

==== Heat 3 ====
Rank	Lane	Athlete	Nation	Time	Notes
1	7	Chelsea Kadiri	Germany	11.52	Q
2	4	Adaejah Hodge	British Virgin Islands	11.59	Q
3	2	Olivia Lundberg	Sweden	11.72	
4	5	Frances Colón	Puerto Rico	11.74	
5	9	Vanessa Sena	Brazil	11.76	
6	8	Taylor Snaer	United States	11.77	
7	6	Chloé Rabac	Switzerland	11.78	
8	3	Uliana Stepaniuk	Ukraine	11.80	
				Wind: +0.4 m/s	

=== Final ===
Rank	Lane	Athlete	Nation	Time	Notes
1st place, gold medalist(s)	6	Alana Reid	Jamaica	11.17	
2nd place, silver medalist(s)	8	Adaejah Hodge	British Virgin Islands	11.27	
3rd place, bronze medalist(s)	4	Kishawna Niles	Barbados	11.37	
4	5	Nia Wedderburn-Goodison	Great Britain	11.46	
5	9	Viwe Jingqi	South Africa	11.57	
6	7	Chelsea Kadiri	Germany	11.58	
7	3	Justina Eyakpobeyan	Nigeria	11.63	
8	2	Aleksandra Stoilova	Australia	11.64	
				Wind: 0.0 m/s	
