= Nora Lindahl =

Swedish and Finnish athlete (born 2004)

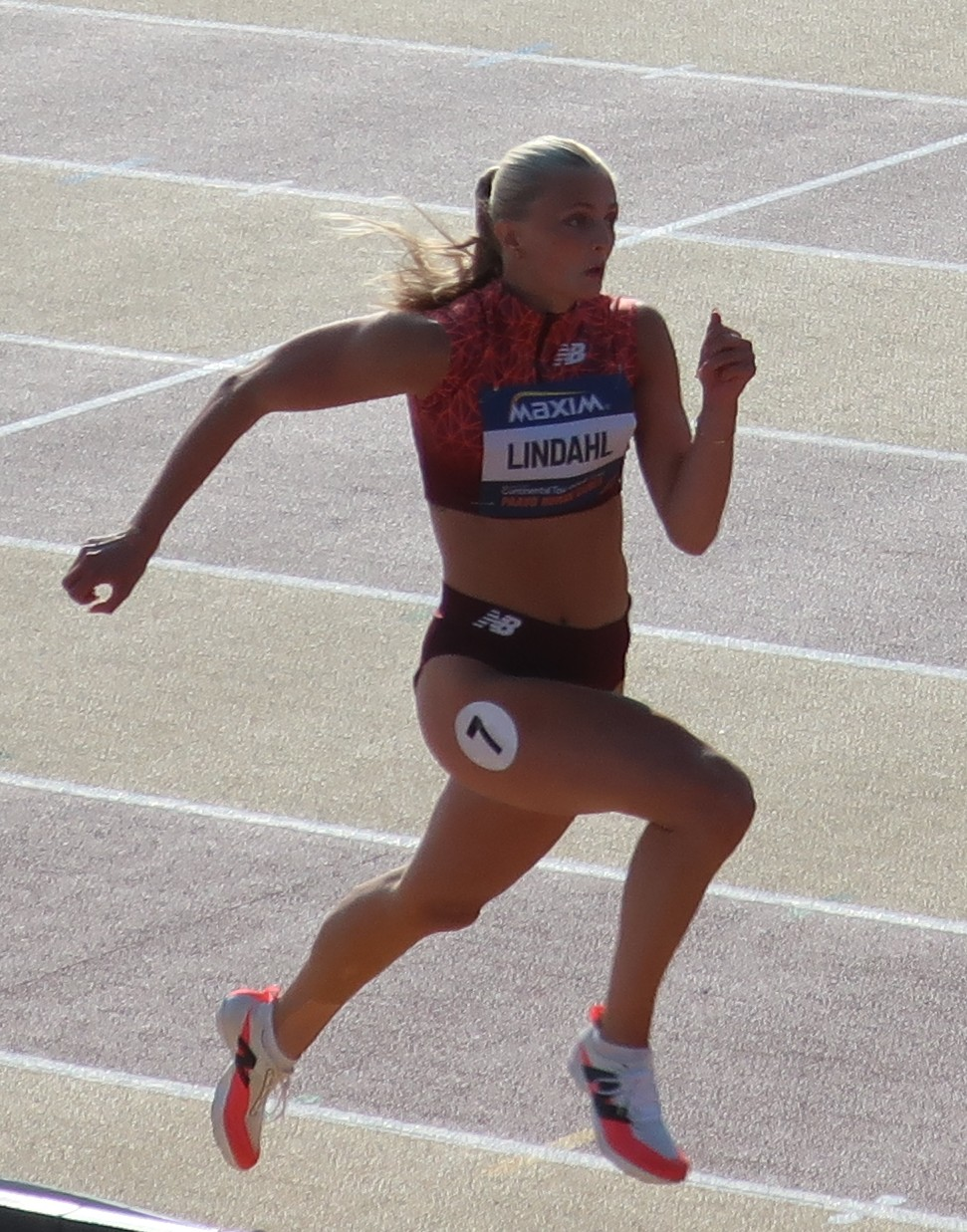
- Lindahl in 2025

Personal information
- Nationality: Finland
- Born: 10 September 2004 (age 21) Luxembourg

Sport
- Sport: Athletics
- Event: Sprint

Achievements and titles
- Personal bests: 60 m: 7.28 (Mustasaari, 2026); 100 m: 11.18 (Vari, 2026); 200 m: 22.87 (Copenhagen, 2026)
Medal record
Women's athletics
Representing Sweden
European U23 Championships
Bronze medal – third place	2025 Bergen	200 m
European U20 Championships
Gold medal – first place	2023 Jerusalem	200 m

Nora Lindahl (born 10 September 2004) is a Swedish and Finnish sprinter. Representing Finland, she was the 2023 European U20 champion over 200 metres and won the Swedish Indoor Athletics Championships over 60 metres in 2026. She has represented Sweden at multiple senior major championships, including the 2024 Olympic Games and 2025 World Athletics Championships. She is set to represent Finland from 31 December 2027.

== Biography ==
In July 2023, she was runner-up to Julia Henriksson at the Swedish Athletics Championships 200 m race in Söderhamn. She won 200 metres at the 2023 European Athletics U20 Championships in Jerusalem in a personal best 23.26 seconds.

In January 2024, she ran 23.71 for the 200 meters last weekend to set a new indoors personal best and move into tenth place on the Swedish all-time list. The following month she lowered her 200 m best to 23.46 running indoors in Metz. That month, she was runner-up to Julia Henriksson at the Swedish Athletics Indoor Championships 200 m race in Karlstad.

In May 2024 she lowered her personal best over 200 metres to 23.13 whilst racing in Kalamata, Greece, to move to fifth place in the Swedish all-time list.

She ran a personal best 22.97 at the 2024 European Athletics Championships in Rome over 200 metres to qualify for the semi-finals. She competed at the 2024 Summer Olympics in Paris over 200 metres.

She won the bronze medal in the 200 metres at the 2025 European Athletics U23 Championships in Bergen, Norway in 22.92 seconds. In September 2025, she competed in the 200 metres at the 2025 World Championships in Tokyo, Japan.

Lindahl equalled her personal best of 7.28 seconds to win the 60 meters at the 2026 Swedish Indoor Championships in Stockholm. In May, she won the 200 metres the Canarias Athletics Invitational in Tenerife. On 13 June, she set a new personal best of 11.18 seconds for the 100 metres. On 22 June, she set a new personal best in the 200 metres with 22.87 seconds in Copenhagen.

== Personal life ==
Born in Luxembourg, Lindahl has dual citizenship of Sweden and Finland. Her father Markus Lindahl is a Finnish former sprinter. She is coached by her Swedish mother Frida Lindahl. Her aunt Åsa Hedström competed as a middle-distance runner. Having previously represented Sweden at international level, she applied to represent Finland with approval granted in 2026, and her eligibility beginning on 31 December 2027. She is a member of HIFK Friidrott club in Finland.
