= Britt de Blaauw =

Dutch sprinter

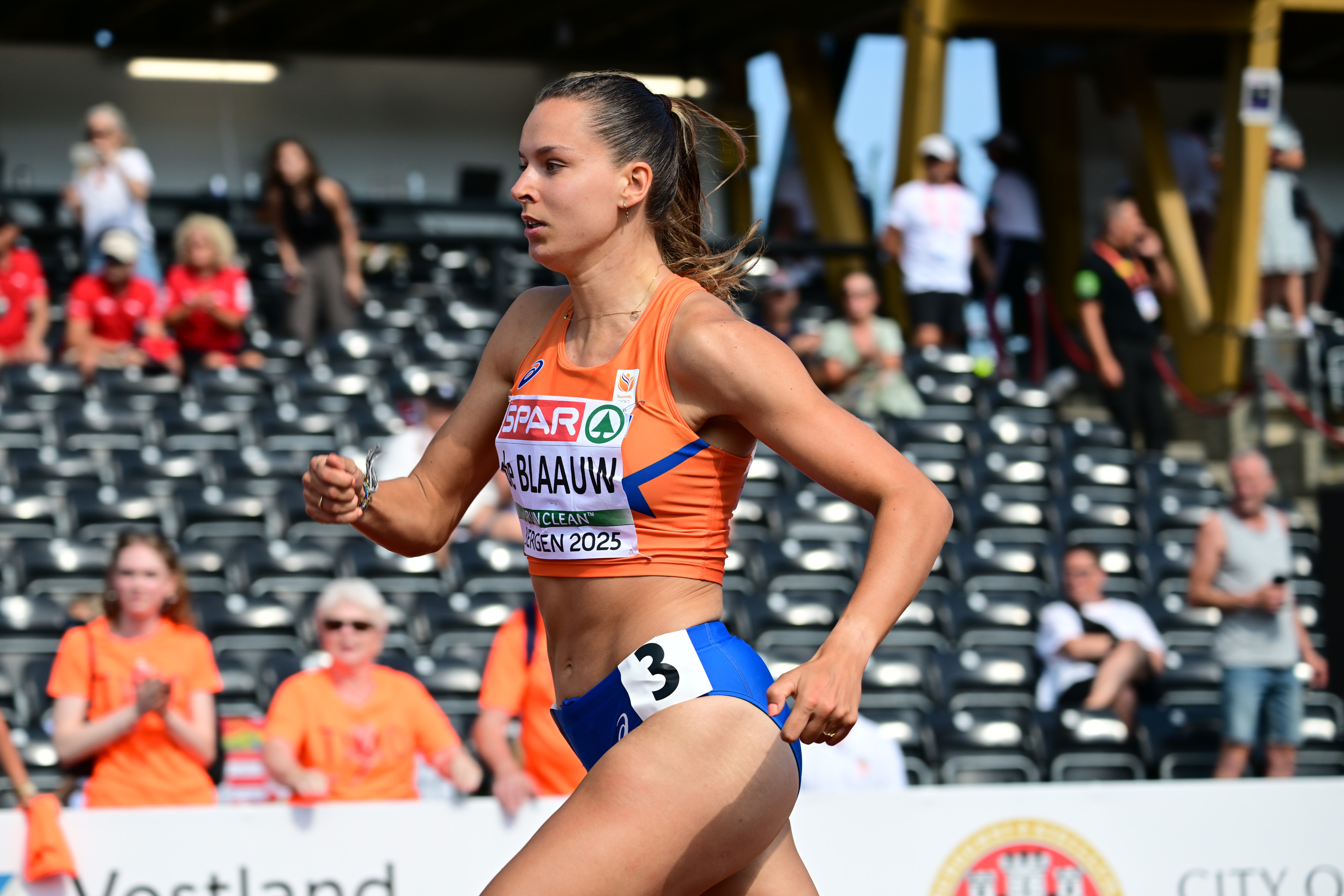
- Britt de Blaauw at the 2025 European Athletics U23 Championships in Bergen, Norway.

Personal information
- Born: 22 April 2004 (age 22)

Sport
- Sport: Athletics
- Event: Sprint

Achievements and titles
- Personal bests: 100m: 11.48 (Hengelo, 2025); 200m: 23.30 (Geneva, 2025)
Medal record
Representing Netherlands
European U20 Championships
Silver medal – second place	2023 Jerusalem	4 × 400 m relay

Britt de Blaauw (born 22 April 2004) is a Dutch sprinter. She competed for the Netherlands at the 2025 World Athletics Championships.

== Biography ==
She was a silver medalist in the relay at the 2023 European Athletics U20 Championships in Jerusalem, Israel. Their time of 3:33.33 was also a new national U20 record.

She was selected for the Dutch team for the 2025 World Athletics Relays in China in May 2025, and ran as part of the 4 x 100 metres ream which qualified for the upcoming world championships. She was a member of the Dutch 4 x 100 metres team which placed fourth at the 2025 European Athletics U23 Championships in Bergen, Norway.

In August 2025 at the 2025 Memorial Van Damme she ran the Dutch national record in the Mixed 4 × 100 metres relay together with Elvis Afrifa, Minke Bisschops and Nsikak Ekpo with a time of 40.96 seconds. She was selected for the Dutch team for the 2025 World Athletics Championships in Tokyo, Japan, running as part of the women's 4 x 100 metres relay team in September 2025, which did not qualify for the final.

De Blaauw competed with the Dutch squad at the 2026 World Athletics Relays in Gaborone, Botswana. On 25 July, she placed third behind Isabel van den Berg and Fenna Achterberg at the Dutch Championships in Hengelo over 100 metres with a time of 11.53 seconds. She competed for the Netherlands at the 2026 European Athletics Championships in both the mixed and women's 4 x 100 metres relay events.

== Personal life ==
She studies Kinesiology at the VU University in Amsterdam.
