= Iris Caligiuri =

Swiss athlete (born 2003)

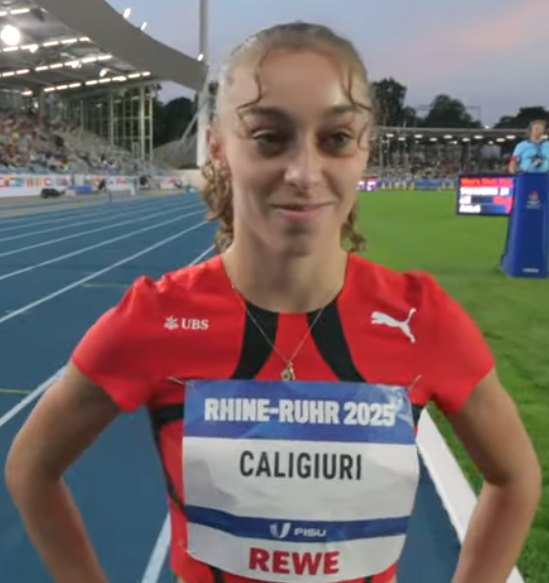
- Caligiuri in 2025

Personal information
- Nationality: Swiss
- Born: 1 July 2003 (age 23)

Sport
- Sport: Athletics
- Event: Sprint
Medal record
Women's athletics
Representing Switzerland
European U23 Championships
| Silver medal – second place | 2025 Bergen | 4 × 100 m relay |
| Bronze medal – third place | 2023 Espoo | 4 × 100 m relay |
World University Games
| Silver medal – second place | 2025 Bochum | 4 × 100 m relay |

Iris Caligiuri (born 1 July 2003) is a Swiss sprinter with French and Italian heritage. She represented Switzerland at the 2025 World Athletics Championships.

== Early and personal life ==
Caligiuri is a resident of Romont in the Glâne District in Switzerland, she holds dual-citizenship with France through her mother who is from Nantes, and has Italian heritage through her father. She studies at the University of Lausanne.

== Career ==
Coached by Kenny Guex, she is a member of Lausanne-Sports member, and was previously with SA Bulle. She won the Swiss under-23 national title over 200 metres in 2023. Caligiuri won a bronze medal representing Switzerland at the 2023 European Athletics U23 Championships in Espoo, Finland, in the women's 4 x 100 metres relay.

In May 2024, she set a new personal best for the 100 metres of 11.64 seconds. That summer, she won a gold medal over 200 metres and a silver medal in the 100 metres at the French U23 Championships in Albi, competing in the colours of the French club Annecy Haute-Savoie Athlétisme.

Caligiuri won a silver medal representing Switzerland at the 2025 World University Games in Germany. She won a silver medal at the 2025 European Athletics U23 Championships in Bergen, in the women's 4 x 100 metres relay. she also had a fifth place finish in the women’s 200 metres final and also ran in the women's 4 x 400 metres relay, with Caligiuri and Fabienne Hoenke sharing relay duties as they both raced in the 200 m final. She ran for Switzerland at the 2025 World Athletics Championships in Tokyo, Japan, in the women's x 400 metres relay.

In May 2026, she ran for Switzerland at the 2026 World Athletics Relays in the women's 4 × 400 metres relay in Gaborone, Botswana. In August 2026, she competed at the 2026 European Athletics Championships in Birmingham, England, in the women's 200 metres, reaching the semi-finals.
