= Success Eduan =

British athlete

Personal information
- Nationality: British
- Born: Success Odyase Eduan; 27 September 2004 (age 22)

Sport
- Sport: Athletics
- Event: Sprint

Achievements and titles
- Personal bests: 100 m: 11.39 (2023); 200 m: 22.43 (2026)
Medal record
Women's athletics
Representing Great Britain
World Ultimate Championship
Third place	2026 Budapest	Mixed 4 × 100 m relay
World Relays
Gold medal – first place	2025 Guangzhou	4 × 100 m relay
European Championships
Gold medal – first place	2026 Birmingham	4 × 100 m relay
European U23 Championships
Gold medal – first place	2025 Bergen	200 m
Gold medal – first place	2025 Bergen	4 × 100 m relay
European U20 Championships
Bronze medal – third place	2021 Tallinn	200 m
Bronze medal – third place	2023 Jerusalem	200 m
Gold medal – first place	2021 Tallinn	4 × 100 m
Silver medal – second place	2023 Jerusalem	4 × 100 m

Success Odyase Eduan (born 27 September 2004) is a British sprinter. She won the 2026 UK Athletics Championships title and 2023 British Indoor Athletics Championships title over 200 metres.

== Early life ==
From Blackley, Manchester, she attended St Matthew's Roman Catholic High School in Moston, Manchester, where she was head girl. Her athletic talent was spotted early at the school whilst running cross-country. She later attended Loreto College, Manchester. She combined her athletics career with studying midwifery at the University of Salford even as she became British champion.

== Career ==
Eduan won a gold medal and a bronze medal at the European Athletics U20 Championships in Tallinn, Estonia in July 2021. She won bronze in the 200 m and gold after anchoring the victorious women's 4 × 100 m relay. In 2022, Eduan won the national U20 title over 200 metres, and was selected to represent Britain at the 2022 World Athletics U20 Championships.

In February 2023, Eduan won at the British Indoor Championships in Birmingham over 200 metres with a time of 23.49 seconds. In August 2023, she won bronze at the 2023 European Athletics U20 Championships in Jerusalem in the 200 metres. She was then part of a 4 × 100 m relay team that won silver at the championships.

In May 2024, Eduan finished runner-up to Joy Eze at the British Universities and Colleges Sport Championships (BUCS) in the 100 metres, running a time of 11.52 seconds, while competing for Salford University. In November 2024, she was named by British Athletics on the Olympic Futures Programme for 2025. Eduan ran the anchor leg for the Great Britain team which won gold in the women's 4 × 100 metres at the World Athletics Relays Championship on 11 May 2025. She won the gold medal in the 200 metres at the 2025 European Athletics U23 Championships in Bergen, Norway in 22.74 seconds. Later in the championships, she anchored the British women's 4 × 100 metres relay team to gold in a championship record time of 42.92 seconds.

Eduan finished in fourth place in the 200 metres at the 2025 UK Athletics Championships in Birmingham, in a personal best 22.53 seconds. She was selected for the British relay pool at the 2025 World Athletics Championships in Tokyo, Japan. In October 2025, she was named on the British Athletics Olympic Futures Programme for 2025/26.

Eduan was named in the British squad for the 2026 World Athletics Relays in Gaborone, Botswana. She anchored the women's 4 × 100 metres as Great Britain secured qualification for the 2027 World Championships. In June 2026, she won the 200 m title at the UK Championships in a personal best of 22.43 seconds. Competing at the 2026 London Athletics Meet on 18 July, she ran the 200 m in 22.53 seconds. She was a finalist in the 200 metres at the 2026 Commonwealth Games in Glasgow, Scotland, placing seventh overall. Later at the Games, she also competed in the women's 4 × 100 m relay. On 15 August, Eduan won the gold medal with the British women's 4 × 100 m relay team at the 2026 European Athletics Championships in Birmingham, with the quartet of Dina Asher-Smith, Amy Hunt, Eduan and Imani-Lara Lansiquot finishing more than a second clear of the field in 42.05 seconds. She was also a finalist in the 200 metres at the championships. At the 2026 Diamond League Final in Brussels in September, she placed seventh in the 200 metres. The following weekend, she was part of the Great Britain mixed 4 × 100 metres relay team which placed third at the inaugural World Ultimate Championship in Budapest. In October 2026, she moved up to podium potential in the 2026-27 Olympic World Class Programme awarded by UK Athletics. Eduan was nominated as part of the Great Britain 4x100m relay team alongside Asher-Smith, Hunt and Lansiquot for Team of the Year by The Sunday Times at the Sportswoman of the Year Awards.

== Athletics achievements ==
=== Personal bests ===
Type	Distance	Time (s)	Wind (m/s)	Venue	Date	Notes
Individual events
Indoor	60 metres	7.41	—N/a	Birmingham, United Kingdom	26 February 2022	
Indoor	200 metres sh	23.41	—N/a	Birmingham, United Kingdom	18 February 2024	
Outdoor	100 metres	11.39	-0.1	Mannheim, Germany	24 June 2023	
Outdoor	200 metres	22.43	-0.9	Birmingham, United Kingdom	21 June 2026	
Team events
Outdoor	4 × 100 metres relay	41.88	—N/a	Tokyo, Japan	20 September 2025	
Outdoor	4 × 400 metres relay	3:51.44	—N/a	Birmingham, United Kingdom	3 August 2024	

=== International competitions ===
Representing Great Britain & England
Year	Competition	Venue	Position	Event	Time
2021	European U20 Championships	Tallinn, Estonia	3rd	200 m	23.62
2021	European U20 Championships	Tallinn, Estonia	1st	4 × 100 m relay	44.62
2022	World U20 Championships	Cali, Colombia	12th (sf)	200 m	23.56
2023	European U20 Championships	Jerusalem, Israel	3rd	200 m	23.34
2023	European U20 Championships	Jerusalem, Israel	2nd	4 × 100 m relay	43.82
2025	World Relays	Guangzhou, China	1st	4 × 100 m relay	42.21
2025	European U23 Championships	Bergen, Norway	1st	200 m	22.74
2025	European U23 Championships	Bergen, Norway	1st	4 × 100 m relay	42.92
2025	World Championships	Tokyo, Japan	4th	4 × 100 m relay	42.07
2026	World Relays	Gaborone, Botswana	—	4 × 100 m relay	DQ (Re)
2026	World Relays	Gaborone, Botswana	2nd	4 × 100 m relay	42.90 (WQ)
2026	Commonwealth Games	Glasgow, United Kingdom	7th	200 m	23.04
2026	Commonwealth Games	Glasgow, United Kingdom	5th	4 × 100 m relay	43.45
2026	European Championships	Birmingham, United Kingdom	6th	200 m	22.66
2026	European Championships	Birmingham, United Kingdom	1st	4 × 100 m relay	42.05
2026	World Ultimate Championship	Budapest, Hungary	13th (h)	200 m	22.93

=== National championships and competitions ===
Year	Competition	Venue	Position	Event	Time
2018	England Championships, U15 events	Bedford	2nd	200 m	25.71
2019	England Indoor Championships, U15 events	Sheffield	1st	200 m	24.72
2019	England Championships, U15 events	Bedford	1st	200 m	23.71
2020	England Championships, U17 events	Sheffield	1st	200 m	24.13
2021	England Championships, U20 events	Bedford	1st	200 m	23.70
2022	England Indoor Championships, U20 events	Sheffield	1st	200 m	23.44
2022	British Indoor Championships	Birmingham	5th	60 m	7.41
2022	England Championships, U20 events	Bedford	1st	200 m	23.62
2023	England Indoor Championships, U20 events	Sheffield	1st	200 m	23.54
2023	British Indoor Championships	Birmingham	1st	200 m	23.49
2023	England Championships, U20 events	Chelmsford	1st	200 m	23.61
2023	British Championships	Manchester	6th	200 m	23.20
2024	British Indoor Championships	Birmingham	2nd	200 m	23.41
2024	British Championships	Manchester	5th	200 m	23.15
2025	Wales Championships, U23 events	Cardiff	1st	200 m	22.69
2025	British Championships	Birmingham	4th	200 m	22.53
2026	British Championships	Birmingham	1st	200 m	22.43
