= Faith Akinbileje =

British athlete (born 2005)

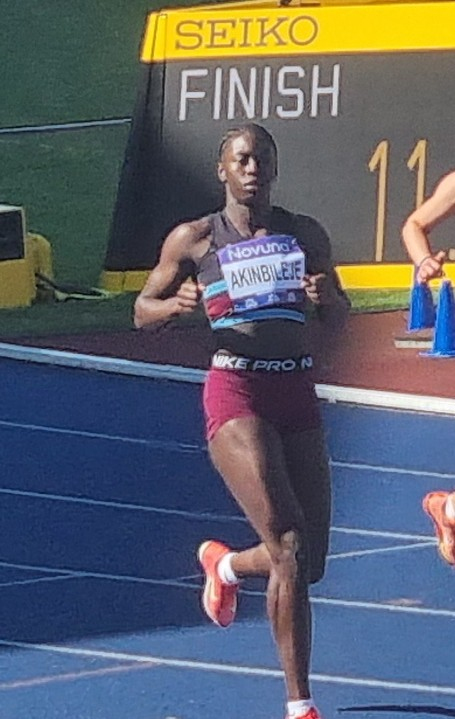

Personal information
- Nationality: British
- Born: 21 September 2005 (age 20)
- Height: 177 cm (5 ft 10 in)

Sport
- Sport: Athletics
- Event: Sprints
- Club: Blackheath & Bromley AC

Achievements and titles
- Personal bests: 60m: 7.29 (Sheffield, 2024); 100m: 11.11 (London, 2025); 200m: 22.76 (London, 2025)
Medal record
Women's athletics
Representing Great Britain
European U23 Championships
Gold medal – first place	2025 Bergen	4x100m relay
European U18 Championships
Gold medal – first place	2022 Jerusalem	200 metres
Gold medal – first place	2022 Jerusalem	Relay medley

Faith Akinbileje (born 21 September 2005) is a British track and field athlete who competes as a sprinter.

== Biography ==
Akinbileje is a member of the Blackheath and Bromley Athletics Club where she was a training partner to Dina Asher-Smith as a youngster. She was voted as the Athletics Weekly British U20 female athlete of the year in 2022. In the July of that year, she won gold medals at the European U18 Championship in Jerusalem, in both the 200 metres and the medley relay. She was subsequently selected for the British team to compete in the 4 x 100m relay at the 2022 World Athletics U20 Championships in Cali, Colombia.

She was selected for the Great Britain and Northern Ireland team to compete at the 2023 European Athletics U20 Championships in Jerusalem, Israel in August 2023.

On 17 February 2024, she qualified for the final at the British Indoor Athletics Championships in the 60 metres event, running 7.34 in the final in Birmingham to finish fourth. In June 2024, she lowered her personal best to 11.51 for the 100 metres at the South of England U20 Championships. In July 2024, she finished fourth in the 200 metres England U20 Championships in Birmingham.

In 2025, she improved her personal best for the 100 metres to 11.19 seconds. She was named in the British team for the 2025 European Athletics U23 Championships in Bergen, Norway. She qualified for the final of the 100 metres, with her time of 11.42 the fastest of the opening heats, placing fourth in the final in 11.50 seconds. Later in the championships, she won a gold medal as part of the women's 4 x 100 metres relay team.

On 2 August 2025, she ran 11.34 seconds to place third in the 100 metres at the 2025 UK Athletics Championships in Birmingham, behind Amy Hunt and Desiree Henry. She returned the following day and finished in sixth place in the 200 metres, running a personal best 22.88 seconds. In October 2025, she was named on the British Athletics Olympic Futures Programme for 2025/26.
