= Chelsea Kadiri =

German sprinter (born 2005)

Personal information
- Born: 27 July 2005 (age 21)

Sport
- Sport: Athletics
- Event: Sprint

Achievements and titles
- Personal bests: 60 m: 7.29 (Leipzig, 2024); 100 m: 11.25 (Kassel, 2023); 200 m: 23.89 (Haldensleben, 2024)
Medal record
Women's athletics
Representing Germany
European U23 Championships
Bronze medal – third place	2025 Bergen	4 × 100 m relay
European U20 Championships
Gold medal – first place	2023 Jerusalem	4 × 100 m relay
European U18 Championships
Silver medal – second place	2022 Jerusalem	100 metres

Chelsea Kadiri (born 27 July 2005) is a German sprinter.

== Biography ==
From Magdeburg, Kadiri won the silver medal in the 100 metres at the 2022 European Athletics U18 Championships in Jerusalem, Israel, running 11.50 seconds in the final (+1.8 m/s) to finish runner-up to Nia Wedderburn-Goodison of Great Britain, having previously set a championship record of 11.52 seconds in the semi-final.

Having won the German U20 title over 100 metres in 11.54 seconds in Rostock in July 2023, and later that month placed second behind Gina Lückenkemper but ahead of Sina Mayer at the senior German Athletics Championships, running 11.33 seconds for the 100 metres in the final, having ran a personal best 11.25 (+0.4) in the semi-final. The following month, Kadiri won gold in the 4 × 100 metres relay at the 2023 European Athletics U20 Championships in Jerusalem, having placed fourth in the final of the 100 metres, missing a medal by 0.01 second.

Kadiri qualified for the final at the 2024 World Athletics U20 Championships in Lima, Peru in the 100 metres, having won her semi-final in 11.52 seconds, ahead of Adaejah Hodge, prior to placing sixth overall in the final.

In July 2025, Kadiri won the German U23 title over 100 metres in a time of 11.39 seconds (+1.7) in Ulm. She won the bronze medal with the German team in the 4 × 100 metres relay at the 2025 European Athletics U23 Championships in Bergen, Norway.

Prior to the start of the 2026 season, Kadiri moved her training base from SC Magdeburg to Sprint Team Wetzlar. She was named in the German team for the 2026 World Athletics Relays in Gaborone, Botswana, and raced as the German mixed 4 × 100 metres team placed fourth overall in the final. In August 2026, she competed at the 2026 European Athletics Championships in Birmingham, England, in the women's 100 metres.
