= Viola John =

German sprinter (born 2003)

Personal information
- Born: 23 June 2003 (age 23)

Sport
- Sport: Athletics
- Event: Sprint

Achievements and titles
- Personal bests: 60m: 7.28 (2026); 100m: 11.35 (2025); 200m: 23.67 (2025)
Medal record
Women's athletics
Representing Germany
European U23 Championships
Bronze medal – third place	2025 Bergen	4×100m relay

Viola John (born 23 June 2003) is a German sprinter.

== Biography ==
From Munich, John competed in multi-events, training at TSV Forstenried under coach Monika Maier before later focusing on sprint and hurdle events, and began attending a specialized sports high school in Unterschleißheim, Bavaria.

A member of LG Stadtwerke München and later LG Brillux Münster, John competed as an individual, as well as winning a bronze medal with the German team in the 4×100 metres relay, at the 2025 European Athletics U23 Championships in Bergen, Norway.

John set a new personal best of 7.28 seconds for the 60 metres in January 2026 at the Westphalian Championships in Dortmund. In February, she was a finalist over 60 m at the German Indoor Championships, placing seventh overall. She was named in the German team for the 2026 World Athletics Relays in Gaborone, Botswana. John ran the opening leg of the women's 4 x 100 metres final as the German team placed sixth overall.
