= 2021 European Athletics U20 Championships =

- Dates: 15–18 July
- Host city: Tallinn, Estonia
- Venue: Kadriorg Stadium
- Level: Under 20
- Events: 44
- Participation: 1230 athletes from 46 nations

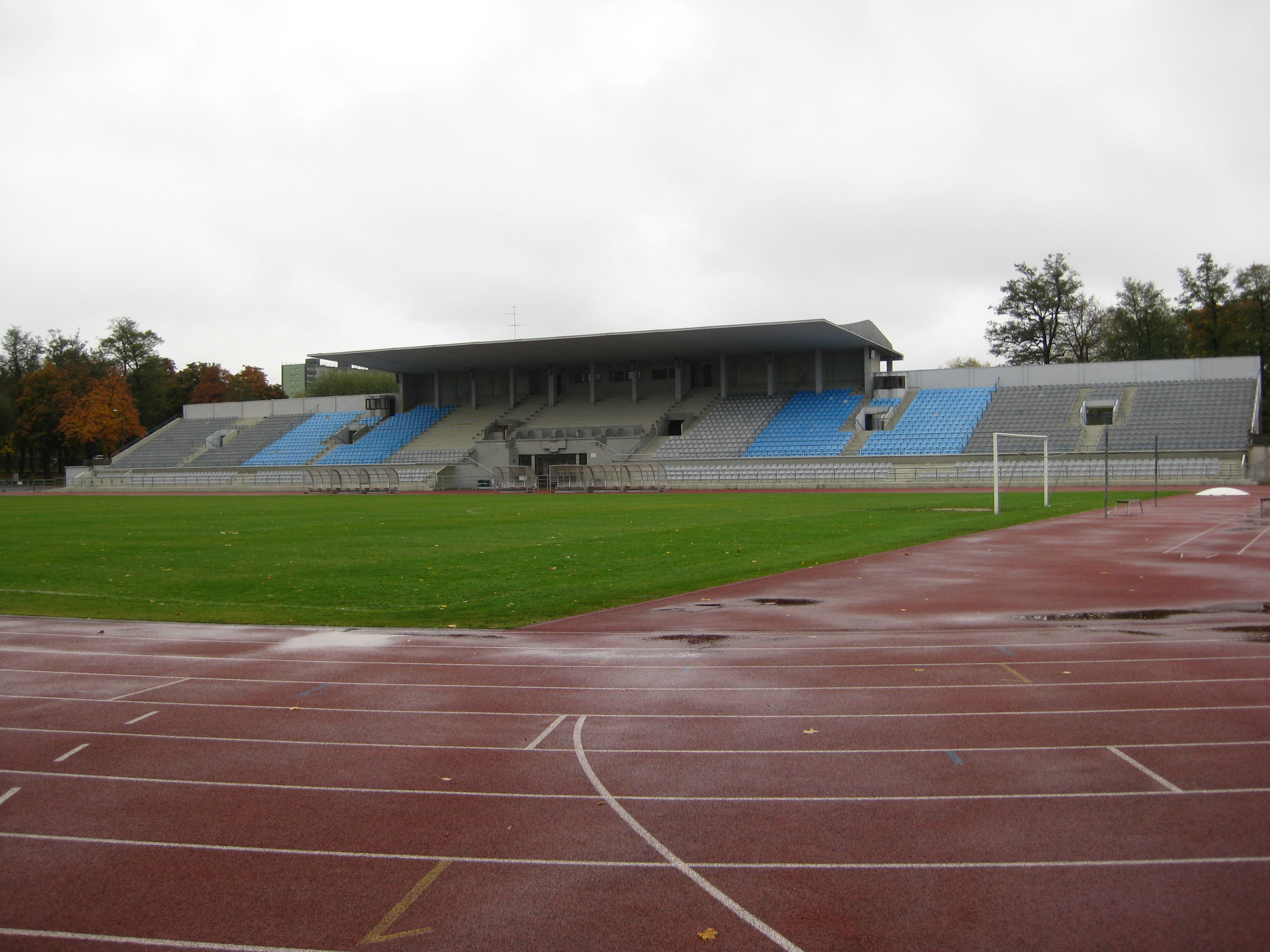

The 2021 European Athletics U20 Championships were the 26th edition of the biennial European U20 athletics championships. They were held in Tallinn, Estonia from 15 July to 18 July. The 2021 European Athletics U23 Championships had been held in the same venue one week earlier, after Bergen renounced.

== Medal summary ==
=== Men ===
==== Track ====
Event	Gold		Silver		Bronze	
100 metres	Toby Makoyawo; Great Britain	10.25 =EU20L	Jeff Erius; France	10.27 EU18L	Matteo Melluzzo; Italy	10.31
200 metres	Derek Kinlock; Great Britain	20.72 PB	Eduard Kubelík; Czech Republic	20.82 NU20R	Federico Guglielmi; Italy	20.98 PB
400 metres	Edward Faulds; Great Britain	45.72 EU20L	Lorenzo Benati; Italy	46.27 PB	Håvard Bentdal Ingvaldsen; Norway	46.70 PB
800 metres	Krzysztof Różnicki; Poland	1:47.44	Kacper Lewalski; Poland	1:48.50	Yanis Meziane; France	1:48.56
1500 metres	Cian McPhillips; Ireland	3:46.55	Rick van Riel; Netherlands	3:46.69	Henry McLuckie; Great Britain	3:47.15
3000 metres	Nick Griggs; Ireland	8:17.18	Yassin Mohumed; Germany	8:18.36	Alex Melloy; Great Britain	8:18.49
5000 metres	Joel Ibler Lillesø; Denmark	14:32.93	David Cantero; Spain	14:33.55	Bastian Mrochen; Germany	14:34.04
110 metres hurdles (100 cm)	Sasha Zhoya; France	13.05 CR	Matthew Sophia; Netherlands	13.26	Lorenzo Simonelli; Italy	13.34 PB
400 metres hurdles	Berke Akçam; Turkey	50.70	Oskar Edlund; Sweden	51.15	Dominik Škorjanc; Croatia	51.78
3000 metres steeplechase	Pol Oriach; Spain	8:41.36 EU20L	Axel Vang Christensen; Denmark	8:42.75 EU18L	Cesare Caiani; Italy	8:50.16 PB
4 × 100 metres relay	Great Britain; Joseph Harding; Jeriel Quainoo; Toby Makoyawo; Ethan Wiltshire	39.74	Netherlands; Matthew Sophia; Nsikak Ekpo; Keitharo Oosterwolde; Xavi Mo-Ajok	40.07	Italy; Angelo Ulisse; Filippo Cappelletti; Federico Guglielmi; Matteo Melluzzo	40.18
4 × 400 metres relay	Great Britain; Brodie Young; Samuel Reardon; Charlie Carvell; Edward Faulds; Reuben Henry-Daire*; Daniel Joyce*	3:05.25 WU20L	Italy; Stefano Grendene; Tommaso Boninti; Francesco Pernici; Lorenzo Benati; Neil Antonel*	3:07.13 SB	Germany; Jan-Lukas Schröder; Max Tank; Malik Skupin-Alfa; Okai Charles; Friedrich Rumpf*	3:08.09 SB
10,000 m walk	Paul McGrath; Spain	42:32.19 PB	Mert Kahraman; Turkey	42:37.83 PB	Dmitriy Gramachkov; Authorised Neutral Athletes	42:39.25 PB

==== Field ====
Event	Gold		Silver		Bronze	
High jump	Jonathan Kapitolnik; Israel	2.25 EU20L	Mateusz Kołodziejski; Poland	2.23 PB	Sam Brereton; Great Britain	2.17 PB
Pole vault	Anthony Ammirati; France	5.64	Matvei Volkov; Belarus	5.44	Oleksandr Onufriyev; Ukraine	5.44 PB
Long jump	Oliver Koletzko; Germany	7.98 WU20L	Bryan Mucret; France	7.93 PB	Erwan Konaté; France	7.91 PB
Triple jump	Gabriel Wallmark; Sweden	16.39 WU20L	Dimitar Tashev; Bulgaria	16.18 PB	Viktor Morozov; Estonia	16.14
Shot put (6 kg)	Muhamet Ramadani; Kosovo	19.92 NU20R	Ilya Misouski; Belarus	19.49	Claudio Stoessel; Germany	19.43 PB
Discus throw (1.75 kg)	Mykolas Alekna; Lithuania	68.00	Magnus Zimmermann; Germany	61.55	Uladzislau Puchko; Belarus	61.06
Hammer throw (6 kg)	Dawid Piłat; Poland	79.59 NU20R	Merlin Hummel; Germany	79.32	Jean-Baptiste Bruxelle; France	77.90
Javelin throw	Artur Felfner; Ukraine	78.41 WU20L	Onni Ruokangas; Finland	73.06 PB	Lenny Brisseault; France	72.62

==== Combined ====
Event	Gold		Silver		Bronze	
Decathlon (junior)	Jente Hauttekeete; Belgium	8150 pts WU20L	Sander Skotheim; Norway	8012 pts PB	Téo Bastien; France	7722 pts PB

=== Women ===
==== Track ====
Event	Gold		Silver		Bronze	
100 metres	Rhasidat Adeleke; Ireland	11.34	Ivana Ilić; Serbia	11.42	Joy Eze; Great Britain	11.44 EU18L
200 metres	Rhasidat Adeleke; Ireland	22.90 NR, EU20L	Minke Bisschops; Netherlands	23.55	Success Eduan; Great Britain	23.62 PB
400 metres	Kornelia Lesiewicz; Poland	52.46	Yemi Mary John; Great Britain	53.06 PB	Veronika Arkhipova; Authorised Neutral Athletes	53.41
800 metres	Audrey Werro; Switzerland	2:03.12	Svitlana Zhulzhyk; Ukraine	2:04.02 PB	Valentina Rosamilia; Switzerland	2:04.08
1500 metres	Ingeborg Østgård; Norway	4:19.75	Marina Martinez; Spain	4:20.35	Mireya Arnedillo; Spain	4:21.29
3000 metres	Ilona Mononen; Finland	9:15.66 PB	Sofia Thøgersen; Denmark	9:16.43 EU18L	Ina Halle Haugen; Norway	9:16.47
5000 metres	Carla Domínguez; Spain	16:16.57	Agate Caune; Latvia	16:17.56 EU18L	Emma Heckel; Germany	16:20.18
100 metres hurdles	Ditaji Kambundji; Switzerland	13.03	Weronika Barcz; Poland	13.42 PB	Marika Majewska; Poland	13.46
400 metres hurdles	Andrea Rooth; Norway	57.16 EU20L	Moa Granat; Sweden	57.94	Martha K.D. Rasmussen; Denmark	58.30
3000 metres steeplechase	Olivia Gürth; Germany	9:59.15 PB	Gréta Varga; Hungary	9:59.17	Sevval Özdoğan; Turkey	10:07.84 PB
4 × 100 metres relay	Alyson Bell; Eve Wright; Joy Eze; Success Eduan; Great Britain	44.62 SB	Cheyenne Kuhn; Sina Kammerschmitt; Antonia Dellert; Holly Okuku; Germany	44.68	Dorota Puzio; Monika Romaszko; Marta Zimna; Magdalena Niemczyk; Poland	44.79
4 × 400 metres relay	Lena Leege; Lara-Noelle Steinbrecher; Anna Hense; Maja Schorr; Germany	3:35.38 WU20L	Carmen Avilés; Berta Segura; Sofia Cosculluela; Lucia Pinacchio; Spain	3:36.10 NU23R	Alessandra Iezzi; Federica Pansini; Angelica Ghergo; Alexandra Almici; Italy	3:36.31 SB
10,000 m walk	Yuliya Khalilova; Authorised Neutral Athletes	46:14.21 EU20L	Eliška Martínková; Czech Republic	46:23.74 PB	Maële Biré-Heslouis; France	46:32.94 PB

==== Field ====
Event	Gold		Silver		Bronze	
High jump	Britt Weerman; Netherlands	1.88 =NU23R	Natalya Spiridonova; Authorised Neutral Athletes	1.86 SB	Elisabeth Pihela; Estonia	1.86 =PB
Pole vault	Sarah Franziska Vogel; Germany	4.30 PB	Emma Brentel; France	4.20	Lisa Gruber; Austria	4.15 =NU20R
Long jump	Maja Åskag; Sweden	6.80	Tessy Ebosele; Spain	6.63 PB	Mikaelle Assani; Germany	6.62
Triple jump	Maja Åskag; Sweden	14.05 EU20L	Valeriya Volovlikova; Authorised Neutral Athletes	13.65 PB	Darja Sopova; Latvia	13.62 NU20R
Shot put	Pınar Akyol; Turkey	16.80	Alida van Daalen; Netherlands	16.56	Nina Chioma Ndubuisi; Germany	15.71 WU18L
Discus throw	Violetta Ignatyeva; Authorised Neutral Athletes	58.65	Alida van Daalen; Netherlands	55.63	Alina Nikitsenka; Belarus	55.04
Hammer throw	Silja Kosonen; Finland	71.06 CR	Rose Loga; France	67.70	Maryola Bukel; Belarus	63.25
Javelin throw	Elina Tzengko; Greece	61.18	Adriana Vilagoš; Serbia	60.44	Anni-Linnea Alanen; Finland	54.80

==== Combined ====
Event	Gold		Silver		Bronze	
Heptathlon	Saga Vanninen; Finland	6271 pts WU20L	Sofie Dokter; Netherlands	5878 pts PB	Marie Dehning; Germany	5778 pts PB

== Medal table ==
* Host nation (Estonia)

Rank	Nation	Gold	Silver	Bronze	Total
1	Great Britain (GBR)	6	1	5	12
2	Germany (GER)	4	4	7	15
3	Ireland (IRL)	4	0	0	4
4	Spain (ESP)	3	4	1	8
5	Poland (POL)	3	3	2	8
6	Sweden (SWE)	3	2	0	5
7	Finland (FIN)	3	1	1	5
8	France (FRA)	2	4	6	12
–	Authorised Neutral Athletes (ANA)^{[1]}	2	2	2	6
9	Norway (NOR)	2	1	2	5
10	Turkey (TUR)	2	1	1	4
11	Switzerland (SUI)	2	0	1	3
12	Netherlands (NED)	1	7	0	8
13	Denmark (DEN)	1	2	1	4
14	Ukraine (UKR)	1	1	1	3
15	Belgium (BEL)	1	0	0	1
15	Greece (GRE)	1	0	0	1
15	Israel (ISR)	1	0	0	1
15	Kosovo (KOS)	1	0	0	1
15	Lithuania (LTU)	1	0	0	1
20	Italy (ITA)	0	2	6	8
21	Belarus (BLR)	0	2	3	5
22	Czech Republic (CZE)	0	2	0	2
22	Serbia (SRB)	0	2	0	2
24	Latvia (LAT)	0	1	1	2
25	Bulgaria (BUL)	0	1	0	1
25	Hungary (HUN)	0	1	0	1
27	Estonia (EST)*	0	0	2	2
28	Austria (AUT)	0	0	1	1
28	Croatia (CRO)	0	0	1	1
Totals (29 entries)		44	44	44	132

^[1] Not included in the official medal table.

== Placing table ==
Results: After 44 events.

Rank	Team	Points
1	Germany	186.5
2	Great Britain	163
3	France	123
4	Poland	91
5	Spain	86
6	Italy	84
7	Finland	66
8	Netherlands	64
9	Norway	60
10	Sweden	58

Rank	Team	Points
11	Belarus	58
12	Ireland	54
13	Turkey	47
14	Ukraine	42
15	Switzerland	36
16	Hungary	32
17	Greece	29
18	Czech Republic	29
19	Denmark	28
20	Israel	22

== Participation ==
1,230 athletes (624 men and 606 women) from 46 nations are expected to participate in these championships.

- Andorra (2)
- Armenia (3)
- Austria (19)
- Authorised Neutral Athletes (24)
- Belarus (31)
- Belgium (23)
- Bulgaria (7)
- Croatia (13)
- Cyprus (8)
- Czech Republic (53)
- Denmark (13)
- Estonia (39)
- Finland (45)
- France (59)
- Georgia (1)
- Germany (95)
- Gibraltar (1)
- Great Britain (67)
- Greece (39)
- Hungary (41)
- Iceland (3)
- Ireland (33)
- Israel (17)
- Italy (87)
- Kosovo (1)
- Latvia (23)
- Liechtenstein (1)
- Lithuania (12)
- Luxembourg (1)
- Malta (3)
- Moldova (2)
- Monaco (1)
- Netherlands (25)
- Norway (41)
- Poland (62)
- Portugal (18)
- Romania (17)
- San Marino (1)
- Serbia (12)
- Slovakia (20)
- Slovenia (20)
- Spain (70)
- Sweden (50)
- Switzerland (41)
- Turkey (46)
- Ukraine (40)

== See also ==
- 2021 European Athletics U23 Championships
