= Fabienne Hoenke =

Swiss sprinter (born 2004)

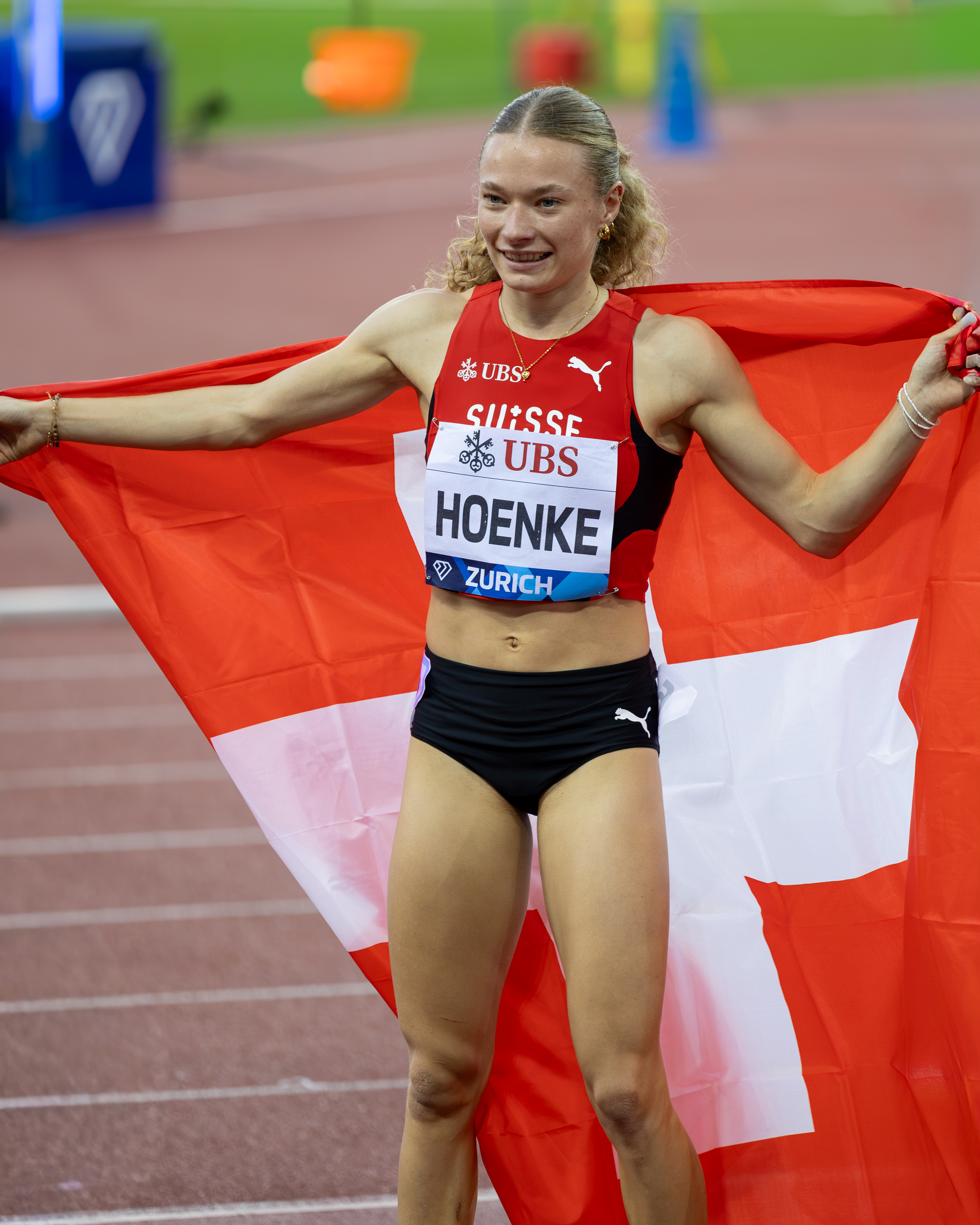
- Hoenke at the 2026 Weltklasse Zürich

Personal information
- Born: 20 January 2004 (age 22)

Sport
- Sport: Athletics
- Event: Sprint

Achievements and titles
- Personal bests: 60 m: 7.29 (2026); 100 m: 11.27 (2026); 200 m: 22.46 (2026)
Medal record
Women's athletics
Representing Switzerland
European Championships
Silver medal – second place	2026 Birmingham	4 × 100 m relay
European U23 Championships
Silver medal – second place	2025 Bergen	4 × 100 m relay

Fabienne Hoenke (born 20 January 2004) is a Swiss sprinter. She won the silver medal at the 2026 European Championships in the women's 4 × 100 metres relay, also placing fourth over 200 metres at the championships.

== Biography ==
Hoenke is from Möhlin, in the canton of Aargau, and is a member of LV Fricktal, having joined the club at ten years-old. She attended Liestal Sports Gymnasium from 2019.

In 2023, she was part of the Swiss team which set a new Swiss U20 record in the 4 × 100 metres relay, and two days later, also broke the Swiss U20 record in the 200 metres with a time of 23.65 seconds. The record had previously been held by Mujinga Kambundji. She gained her first experience at international championships in 2023, when she finished fifth in the 200 metres at the 2023 European Athletics U20 Championships in Jerusalem.

Hoenke represented her country at the 2024 European Athletics Championships in Rome, without advancing to the semi-finals of the 200 metres having run 23.59 seconds. At 20 years-old, she was the youngest individual competitor on the Swiss European Championship team.

In July 2025, she won a silver medal with the Swiss women's 4 × 100 metres relay team at the 2025 European Athletics U23 Championships in Bergen, Norway.

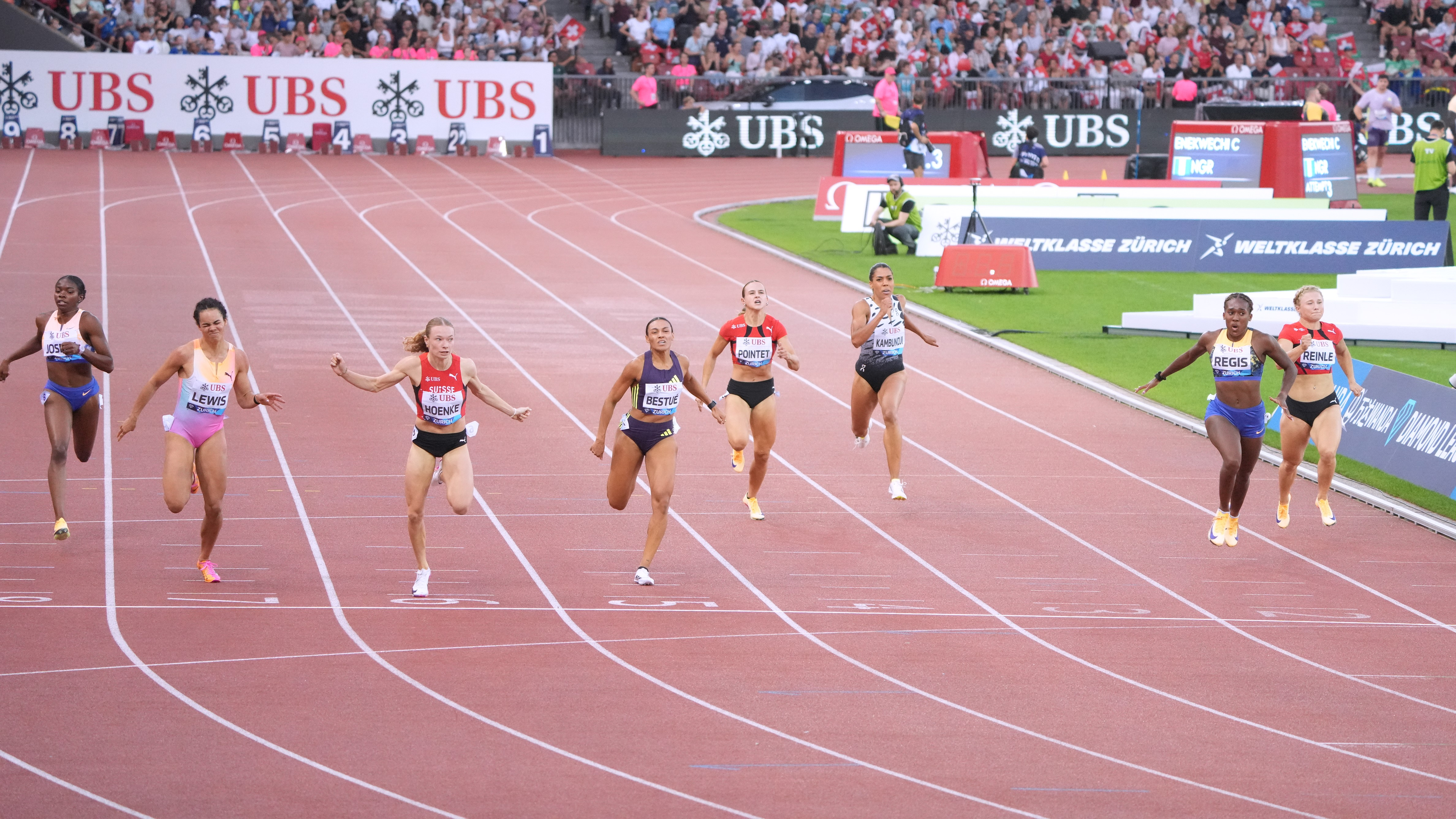
Fabienne Hoenke (SUI) wins the 200 m at Weltklasse Zürich 2026 in 22.53.

In May 2026, she ran at the World Athletics Relays in the women's 4 × 100 metres relay in Gaborone, Botswana. In July 2026, she made her Diamond League debut at Herculis in Monaco, running a personal best time for the 200 metres of 22.50 seconds. The following week she won in 22.78 seconds over 200 metres at Spitzen Leichtathletik Luzern, finishing ahead of Lavanya Williams and Sada Williams. In August, she ran in the final of the women's 4 × 100 metres relay at the 2026 European Athletics Championships in Birmingham, with the Switzerland team winning the silver medal. She had also placed fourth in the final of the 200 metres at the championships. On 27 August 2026, Hoenke won the 200 metres at Weltklasse Zürich in 22.53 seconds, recording the third-fastest time of her career. In September, she qualified for the final over 200 m at the inaugural World Ultimate Championship in Budapest, placing eighth overall.
