= Isabel van den Berg =

Dutch athlete (born 2005)

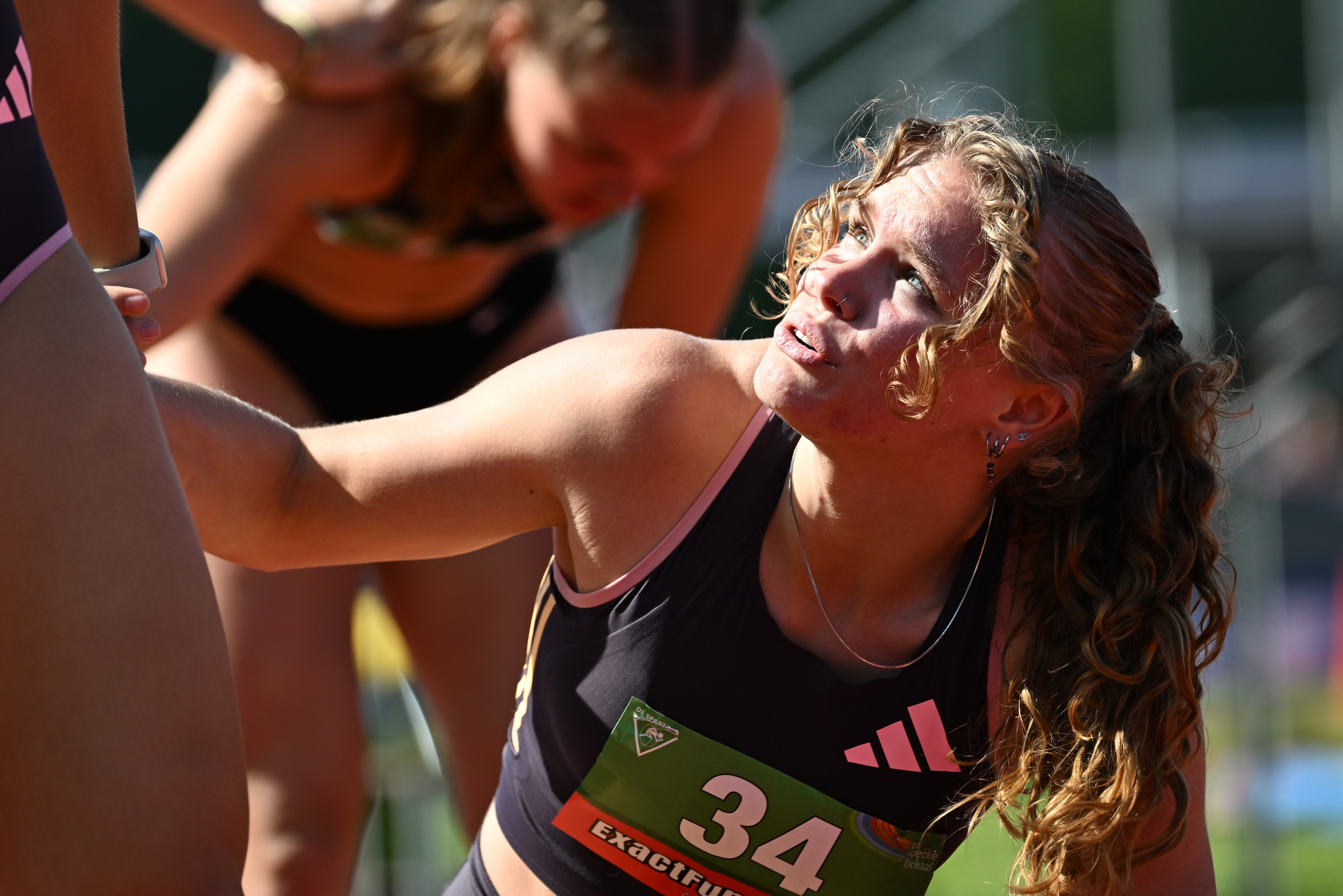
- Isabel van den Berg in 2024.

Personal information
- Nationality: Dutch
- Born: 5 February 2005 (age 21)
- Height: 1.69 m (5 ft 7 in)

Sport
- Sport: Athletics
- Event: Sprint

Achievements and titles
- Personal bests: 60m: 7.24 (2025); 100m: 11.32 (2026); 200m: 23.63 (2024)

Isabel van den Berg (born 2 February 2005) is a Dutch sprinter. She won the Dutch Athletics Championships over 100 metres in 2026, and competed at the 2024 Paris Olympics.

== Biography ==
=== 2023 ===
In February 2023, she competed in the Dutch U20 Indoors Championships as an 18-year-old. She finished second in the 60 meters with a time of 7.67 seconds. The following day she won gold in the 200 meters in a personal best of 24.63 seconds. Ten following week, she reached the final of the 200 meters at the senior Dutch Indoor Athletics Championships in Apeldoorn, running a personal best time of 24.51 seconds.

In July 2023, she finished seventh at the senior Dutch Athletics Championships in Breda over 200 metres running 24.59 seconds.

=== 2024 ===
She finished fifth in both the 100 metres and 200 metres races at the 2024 Dutch Athletics Championships in June 2024, running two personal best times in the process (11.53 and 23.63 seconds).

In July 2024, she was named in the Dutch relay pool for the 2024 Summer Olympics. On 8 August 2024, she ran as part of the Dutch 4 × 100 m relay team in Paris which qualified for the final, alongside Minke Bisschops, Marije van Hunenstijn, and Tasa Jiya.

=== 2025 ===
She ran a personal best 7.24 seconds to finish runner-up over 60 metres at the 2025 Dutch indoor national championships in February 2025. Competing at the 2025 European Athletics Indoor Championships, she ran 7.32 seconds without progressing past her heat.

She was a member of the Dutch 4 x 100 metres team which placed fourth at the 2025 European Athletics U23 Championships in Bergen, Norway. She was selected for the Dutch team for the 2025 World Athletics Championships in Tokyo, Japan, running as part of the women's 4 x 100 metres relay team in September 2025.

=== 2026 ===
On 1 March 2026, van den Berg won the 200 metres at the Dutch Indoor Athletics Championships in Apeldoorn. She also placed third in the 60 metres final at the championships. She competed with the Dutch squad at the 2026 World Athletics Relays in Gaborone, Botswana. On 25 July, she won the Dutch Championships in Hengelo over 100 metres with a personal best time of 11.32 seconds. She competed for the Netherlands at the 2026 European Athletics Championships.

== Personal life ==
She was born in Amstelveen, and started her athletics career at Athletics Association Amstelveen. She attended secondary school at Amstelveen College. Her family moved to Aalsmeer in 2019. She is a member of the Athletics club Phanos in Amsterdam. She has a brother, and a sister, Milou, who is also an athlete and who has competed in shot put and hurdles.
