= Alyson Bell =

British athlete (born 2003)

Personal information
- Nationality: British (Scottish)
- Born: 9 November 2003 (age 22)

Sport
- Sport: Athletics
- Event: Sprint

Achievements and titles
- Personal bests: 60m: 7.30 (Sheffield, 2025); 100m: 11.31 (Geneva, 2023); 200m: 23.12 (Birmingham, 2025)
Medal record
Women's athletics
Representing Great Britain
World Relays
Bronze medal – third place	2024 Nassau	4×100 m relay
European U23 Championships
Gold medal – first place	2025 Bergen	4x100m relay
Gold medal – first place	2023 Espoo	4x100m relay
European Athletics U20 Championships
Gold medal – first place	2021 Tallinn	4x100 m relay

Alyson Bell (born 9 November 2003) is a British track and field athlete who competes as a sprinter. She became British indoor champion, and Scottish national indoor record holder, over 200 metres in 2025.

== Early life ==
Bell runs for Giffnock North Athletic Club and attended Edinburgh University. At university, she shared a flat with fellow Scottish international athlete Megan Keith, and triathlete Isla Britton.

== Career ==
Bell won gold as part of the 4 × 100 m relay team at the 2021 European Athletics U20 Championships in Tallinn. She also won a gold as part of the 4 × 100 m relay team at the 2023 European U23 Athletics Championships in Espoo.

She was chosen to represent Great Britain at the 2023 World Athletics Championships in Budapest in August 2023. In October 2023, Bell was included in the World Class Programme by UK Athletics for the first time.

On 17 February 2024, she qualified for the final at the British national indoor championships in the 60 metres event, running 7.41 in the final in Birmingham to finish seventh.

In April 2024, she was selected as part of the British team for the 2024 World Athletics Relays in Nassau, Bahamas. In November 2024, she was named by British Athletics on the Olympic Futures Programme for 2025. She was chosen to represent Scotland at the 2024 Loughborough International in May 2024.

She set a Scottish indoor record of 23.12 seconds to win the Senior national title at the 2025 British Indoor Athletics Championships in Birmingham, on 23 February 2025, breaking the previous mark set by Zoey Clark.

She was named in the British team for the 2025 European Athletics U23 Championships in Bergen, winning a gold medal as part of the women’s 4 x 100 metres relay team which won in a championship record time of 42.92 seconds. In October 2025, she was retained on the British Athletics Olympic Futures Programme for 2025/26.

Bell was a finalist in the 60 metres at the 2026 British Indoor Athletics Championships in Birmingham, on 14 February 2026, placing sixth overall. Bell also qualified for the final of the 200 metres the following day, but did not run in the final.

Bell was named in the British squad for the 4 x 100 metres relay at the 2026 World Athletics Relays in Gaborone, Botswana. She competed in the mixed 4 x 100 m relay as the team qualified for the 2027 World Athletics Championships. She was a semi-finalist in the 200 metres at the 2026 Commonwealth Games in Glasgow, Scotland. Later at the Games, she also competed in the women's 4 × 100 m relay.

== Athletics achievements ==
=== International competitions ===
Representing Great Britain & Scotland
Year	Competition	Venue	Position	Event	Time
2021	European U20 Championships	Tallinn, Estonia	1st	4 × 100 m relay	44.62
2022	World U20 Championships	Cali, Colombia	—	4 × 100 m relay	DNF
2023	European Team Championships First Division	Chorzów, Poland	—	4 × 100 m relay	DQ
2023	European U23 Championships	Espoo, Finland	6th	100 m	11.46
2023	European U23 Championships	Espoo, Finland	1st	4 × 100 m relay	43.04
2024	World Relays	Nassau, The Bahamas	3rd	4 × 100 m relay	42.80
2025	European U23 Championships	Bergen, Norway	10th (sf)	200 m	23.59
2025	European U23 Championships	Bergen, Norway	1st	4 × 100 m relay	42.92
2026	World Relays	Gaborone, Botswana	—	4 × 100 m relay	DQ (Re)
2026	World Relays	Gaborone, Botswana	2nd	4 × 100 m relay	42.90 (WQ)
2026	Commonwealth Games	Glasgow, United Kingdom	16th (sf)	200 m	23.42
2026	Commonwealth Games	Glasgow, United Kingdom	7th	4 × 100 m relay	44.81

=== National championships and competitions ===
Year	Competition	Venue	Position	Event	Time
2016	Scottish Indoor Championships, U13 events	Glasgow	1st	60 m	8.11
2017	Scottish Indoor Championships, U15 events	Glasgow	2nd	60 m	8.04
2017	Scottish Championships, U15 events	Glasgow	1st	100 m	12.36
2018	England Indoor Championships, U15 events	Sheffield	2nd	60 m	7.89
2018	England Indoor Championships, U15 events	Sheffield	1st	200 m	25.45
2018	Scottish Indoor Championships, U15 events	Glasgow	1st	200 m	25.74
2018	Scottish Indoor Championships, U15 events	Glasgow	1st	60 m	7.82
2019	Scottish Indoor Championships, U17 events	Glasgow	1st	200 m	25.17
2019	Scottish Indoor Championships, U17 events	Glasgow	2nd	60 m	7.65
2019	Scottish Championships, U20 events	Glasgow	1st	100 m	12.22
2019	Scottish Championships, U17 events	Glasgow	1st	100 m	12.04
2019	Scottish Championships, U17 events	Glasgow	1st	200 m	24.64
2020	Scottish Indoor Championships, U17 events	Glasgow	2nd	60 m	7.59
2020	Scottish Indoor Championships, U17 events	Glasgow	1st	200 m	25.02
2020	England Indoor Championships, U17 events	Sheffield	3rd	60 m	7.57
2020	England Indoor Championships, U17 events	Sheffield	4th	200 m	24.76
2021	England Championships, U20 events	Bedford	3rd	100 m	11.92
2022	England Championships, U20 events	Bedford	4th	100 m	11.72
2023	British Indoor Championships	Birmingham	10th (sf)	60 m	7.46
2024	British Indoor Championships	Birmingham	7th	60 m	7.41
2025	British Indoor Championships	Birmingham	5th	60 m	7.31
2025	British Indoor Championships	Birmingham	1st	200 m	23.12
2026	British Indoor Championships	Birmingham	6th	60 m	7.43
2026	British Indoor Championships	Birmingham	—	200 m	DNS
