= Holly Okuku =

German sprinter (born 2005)

Personal information
- Born: 23 March 2005 (age 21)

Sport
- Sport: Athletics
- Event: Sprint

Achievements and titles
- Personal best(s): 60m: 7.47 (Dortmund, 2023); 100m: 11.39 (Austin, 2025); 200m: 22.85 (Gainesville, 2025); 400m: 54.53 (Albuquerque, 2025)
Medal record
Women's athletics
Representing Germany
European U23 Championships
Bronze medal – third place	2025 Bergen	4x100m relay
European U20 Championships
Gold medal – first place	2023 Jerusalem	4x100m relay
Silver medal – second place	2021 Tallinn	4x100m relay
European U18 Championships
Silver medal – second place	2022 Jerusalem	200 metres

Holly Okuku (born 23 March 2005) is a German sprinter.

== Biography ==
Okuku is from Baunatal and trained as a member of GSV Eintracht Baunatal in the district of Kassel, in Hesse. She is the daughter of sprinter Florence Ekpo-Umoh. She showed aptitude for sprinting at a young age, and was running below 12 seconds for the 100 metres as an under-14 athlete in 2019.

Okuku won the silver medal with the German team in the 4x100 metres relay at the 2021 European Athletics U20 Championships in Tallinn, Estonia. In 2022, as a 17-year-old, she ran a time of 23.62 seconds for the 200 metres. She won the silver medal in the 200 metres at the 2022 European Athletics U18 Championships in Jerusalem, Israel in July 2022. She placed fourth with the German team in the 4 × 100 m relay at the 2022 World Athletics U20 Championships in Cali, Colombia.

Following that, Okuku changed clubs, moving to join the Wetzlar Sprint Team from 1 January 2023, but with the understanding that she could continue to train in Baunatal under coach Holger Menne. She won the gold medal with the German team in the 4 × 100 m relay at the 2023 European Athletics U20 Championships in Jerusalem, Israel.

Okuku ran 22.85 seconds for the 200 metres in April 2025 at the Tom Jones Memorial in Gainesville, Florida. Competing for the University of Texas, she was a semi-finalist at the 2025 NCAA Outdoor Championships in June 2025 in Eugene, Oregon, in the 200 metres. She won the bronze medal with the German team in the 4 × 100 m relay at the 2025 European Athletics U23 Championships in Bergen, Norway.
