= Nia Wedderburn-Goodison =

British athlete

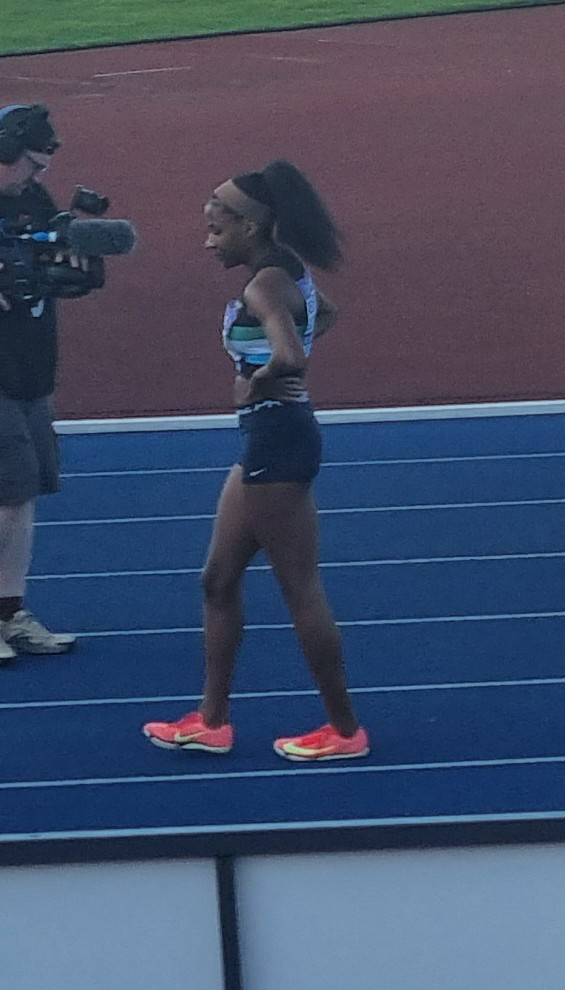
- Nia Wedderburn-Goodison at the 2025 UK Athletics Championships

Personal information
- Nationality: Great Britain
- Born: 9 January 2005 (age 21)

Sport
- Sport: Athletics
- Event: Sprint

Achievements and titles
- Personal bests: 60m: 7.23 (2026); 100m: 11.16s (2025); 200m: 23.23 (2024)
Medal record
Women's athletics
Representing Great Britain
World Relays
Gold medal – first place	2025 Guangzhou	4×100 m relay
Bronze medal – third place	2025 Guangzhou	mixed 4×100 m relay
European U23 Championships
Silver medal – second place	2025 Bergen	100m
Gold medal – first place	2025 Bergen	4x100 m relay
World U20 Championships
Bronze medal – third place	2024 Lima	100 m
European U18 Championships
Gold medal – first place	2022 Jerusalem	100 metres
Gold medal – first place	2022 Jerusalem	Relay medley

Nia Wedderburn-Goodison (born 9 January 2005) is a British track and field athlete who competes as a sprinter. In 2022, she won gold medals at the European U18 Championship in both the 100m and the medley relay.

== Early life ==
She was first taken to an athletics club by her parents after winning a mixed school sports day race by a considerable margin when she was just five years-old. She later attended Capital City Academy, in Willesden.

== Career ==
At just age of 16 years-old, Wedderburn-Goodison became the British under-20 champion over 100 metres in June 2021. In July 2022, she won gold medals at the European U18 Championship in Jerusalem, in both the 100m and the medley relay. She was selected for the 100 metres and as part of the 4 × 100 m relay team for the 2022 World Athletics U20 Championships in Cali, Colombia.

She was coached by Michael Frater for six weeks in Kingston, Jamaica in 2023. After this, competing at the British Athletics Championships in Manchester, she reached the final in the 100m and finished sixth overall. She was selected for the Great Britain and Northern Ireland team to compete at the 2023 European Athletics U20 Championships in Jerusalem, Israel in August 2023.

On 17 February 2024, she qualified for the final at the British national indoor championships in the 60 metres event, running 7.39 in the final in Birmingham to finish sixth. In June 2034, she set a new personal best of 11.21 metres for the 100 metres whilst racing in Lee Valley. She was selected for the 2024 World Athletics U20 Championships in Lima, Peru where she qualified second fastest for the final in the women's 100 metres, running 11.39 seconds and placed fourth in the final. She was later promoted to the bronze medal after Adeajah Hodge was disqualified for a failed drug test. In October 2024, she was nominated by Athletics Weekly for best British female junior. In November 2024, she was named by British Athletics on the Olympic Futures Programme for 2025.

She was named in the British team for the 2025 World Athletics Relays in Guangzhou. She made her senior international debut racing in the mixed 4 x 100 metres relay, alongside Joe Ferguson, Kissiwaa Mensah and Jeriel Quainoo as the British quartet finished second in their heat to qualify for the final. The following day, Wedderburn-Goodison was moved into the women's 4x100 metres team, helping them to take the gold medal. She won the silver medal in the 100 metres race at the 2025 European Athletics U23 Championships, running a time of 11.38 seconds into a headwind (-1.3 m/s) in Bergen, Norway. Later in the championships, she ran as part of the British women's 4 x 100 metres relay team that won the gold medal in a championship record time of 42.92 seconds. On 2 August, she finished fifth in the final of the 100 metres at the 2025 UK Athletics Championships in Birmingham in 11.37 seconds. In October 2025, she was named on the British Athletics Olympic Futures Programme for 2025/26. She also became a member of Dynamic Speed Track Club in Jamaica.

Wedderburn-Goodison was named in the British squad for the 4 x 100 metres relay at the 2026 World Athletics Relays in Gaborone, Botswana, running in the women's 4 x 100 m relay as the team qualified for the 2027 World Championships. On 21 June, she set an equal personal best of 23.23 seconds to qualify for the final of the 200 metres at the 2026 UK Athletics Championships, prior to placing eighth in the final in 23.28 seconds.

== Personal life ==
Her uncle is involved with managing the sprinting group Titans International in Jamaica. She has a sister.
