= Jeriel Quainoo =

British athlete (born 2003)

Personal information
- Nationality: British (English)
- Born: 17 April 2003 (age 23)

Sport
- Sport: Athletics
- Event: Sprint
- Club: Blackheath & Bromley AC

Achievements and titles
- Personal bests: 60m: 6.74 (London, 2022); 100m: 10.26 (Tallinn, 2021); 200m: 20.34 (Clermont, 2024)
Medal record
Men's athletics
Representing Great Britain
World Relays
Bronze medal – third place	2025 Guangzhou	mixed 4×100 m relay
European U20 Championships
Gold medal – first place	2021 Tallinn	4x100m relay

Jeriel Quainoo (born 17 April 2003) is a British sprinter.

== Early life ==
Quainoo grew up in Ladbroke Grove, and trained as a teenager at the Linford Christie Stadium. He attended Oaklands College in Hertfordshire.

== Career ==
Coached by Ryan Freckleton at Blackheath & Bromley Athletic Club, he was a European U20 4 × 100 m gold medalist in 2021 in Tallinn.

In July 2022, he finished third in the 200 metres at the senior 2022 British Athletics Championships in Manchester with a 20.40 seconds personal best.

He followed that up by winning a 100m and 200m sprint double at the English U20 Championships in Bedford. He represented Britain at the 2022 World Athletics U20 Championships in Cali, Colombia in August 2022. After qualifying for the final, he finished in seventh place in the 200 metres.

In May 2024, he was selected to run the 200 metres and 4 × 100 m relay for Britain at the 2024 European Athletics Championships in Rome. In November 2024, he was named by British Athletics on the Olympic Futures Programme for 2025.

He was named in the British team for the 2025 World Athletics Relays in Guangzhou. He ran in the mixed 4 x 100 metres relay, alongside Nia Wedderburn-Goodison, Kissiwaa Mensah and Joe Ferguson as the British quartet finished second in their heat to qualify for the final. In the final, they won the bronze medal in the event. He was named in the British team for the 2025 European Athletics U23 Championships in Bergen. In October 2025, he was retained on the British Athletics Olympic Futures Programme for 2025/26.

Quainoo was a semi-finalist in the 60 metres at the 2026 British Indoor Athletics Championships in Birmingham, on 14 February 2026.

Quainoo was named in the British squad for the 4 x 100 metres relay at the 2026 World Athletics Relays in Gaborone, Botswana. He competed in the mixed 4 x 100 m relay as the team qualified for the 2027 World Athletics Championships.
