= Joy Eze (British sprinter) =

British athlete

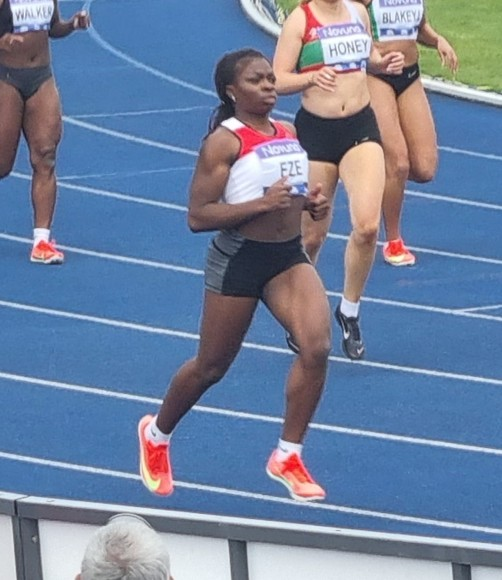
- 2025 UK Athletics Championships

Personal information
- Nationality: Great Britain
- Born: 31 May 2004 (age 22)

Sport
- Sport: Athletics
- Event: Sprint

Achievements and titles
- Personal best(s): 60 m: 7.19 (Sheffield, 2025); 100 m: 11.24 (London, 2025); 200 m: 23.46 (London, 2024)
Medal record
Women's athletics
Representing Great Britain
European U23 Championships
Gold medal – first place	2025 Bergen	4x100m relay
European U20 Championships
Gold medal – first place	2023 Jerusalem	100 m
Gold medal – first place	2021 Tallinn	4 × 100 m
Silver medal – second place	2023 Jerusalem	4 × 100 m
Bronze medal – third place	2021 Tallinn	100 m

Joy Eze (born 31 May 2004) is a British track and field athlete who competes as a sprinter. The British Universities and Colleges and European U20 champion over 100 metres, she was British Indoor Championships runner-up over 60 metres in 2025 and made her major international debut at the European Indoor Championships in 2025.

== Early life ==
From Walker, Newcastle upon Tyne, Eze attended St Mary’s Catholic High School. She is a member of the Gateshead Harriers. She studied Pharmacy at Newcastle University.

== Career ==
In 2021 competing at the 2021 European Athletics U20 Championships in Tallinn, Estonia, Eze won the bronze medal in the individual 100 metres, and the gold medal in the women's 4 × 100 m relay. She was selected to compete in the British team for the 2022 World Athletics U20 Championships in Cali, Colombia.

She won the British Universities 60 m title in March 2023, as well as the national U20 60 m title that month. In August 2023, Eze became European U20 champion in the 100 metres in Jerusalem, Israel, pipping compatriot Renee Regis into silver by 0.01 seconds. She lowered her personal best over 100 m to 11.37 s at the event. Eze and Regis were then part of the women's 4 × 100 m relay team that won the silvermedal at the championships.

In May 2024, she won the British Universities and Colleges Sport (BUCS) 100 metres title in a time of 11.49 seconds. That month, she was selected to represent England at the Loughborough International.

She finished second over 60 metres at the 2025 British Indoor Athletics Championships, in Birmingham, in February 2025. She was selected for the British team for the 2025 European Athletics Indoor Championships in Apeldoorn, Netherlands, where she ran 7.20 seconds to qualify for the semi-finals. In the semi-final she ran 7.25 seconds and did not progress to the final.

She was named in the British team for the 2025 European Athletics U23 Championships in Bergen, Norway, winning a gold medal as part of the women’s 4 x 100 metres relay team. On 2 August, she finished fourth in the final of the 100 metres at the 2025 UK Athletics Championships in Birmingham in 11.35 seconds. She was selected for the British relay pool at the 2025 World Athletics Championships in Tokyo, Japan. In October 2025, she was named on the British Athletics Olympic Futures Programme for 2025/26.

Eze was a finalist in the 60 metres at the 2026 British Indoor Athletics Championships in Birmingham, on 14 February 2026, placing fifth overall. On 20 June, she was a finalist in the 100 metres at the 2026 UK Championships.
