= 2025 European Athletics U23 Championships =

Sports competition in Bergen, Norway

- Organisers: EAA
- Edition: 15th
- Dates: 17–20 July
- Host city: Bergen, Norway
- Venue: Fana Stadion
- Level: Under 23
- Type: Outdoor
- Events: 44
- Participation: 1,245 athletes from 44 nations
- Official website: Bergen 2025

The 2025 European Athletics U23 Championships was the 15th edition of the biennial athletics competition between European athletes under the age of twenty three. The event is organized by European Athletics Association and held from 17–20 July 2025 in Bergen, Norway. This was the first time that Norway stages the European Athletics U23 Championships.

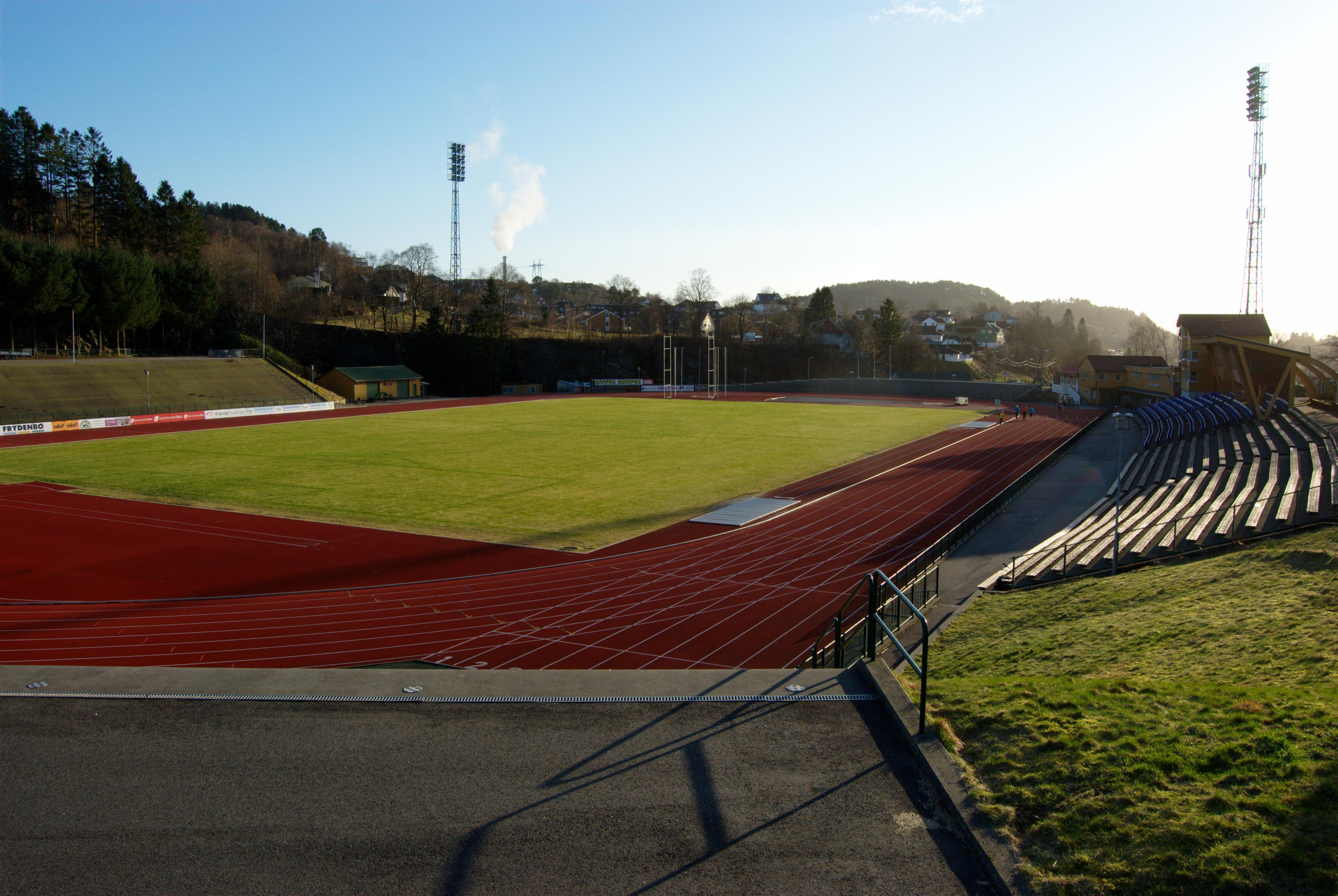
Fana stadion.

== Medal table ==
* Host nation (Norway)

Rank	Nation	Gold	Silver	Bronze	Total
1	Germany	5	9	12	26
2	Great Britain	4	4	3	11
3	Spain	4	3	4	11
4	Netherlands	4	3	1	8
5	France	3	6	3	12
6	Italy	3	3	3	9
7	Poland	2	2	1	5
8	Czech Republic	2	1	0	3
8	Switzerland	2	1	0	3
8	Turkey	2	1	0	3
11	Finland	2	0	2	4
12	Serbia	2	0	1	3
13	Romania	2	0	0	2
14	Ireland	1	2	2	5
15	Norway*	1	1	1	3
16	Cyprus	1	0	1	2
17	Austria	1	0	0	1
17	Denmark	1	0	0	1
17	Israel	1	0	0	1
17	Ukraine	1	0	0	1
21	Sweden	0	3	2	5
22	Bulgaria	0	2	0	2
23	Greece	0	1	2	3
24	Belgium	0	1	1	2
25	Hungary	0	1	0	1
25	Lithuania	0	1	0	1
27	Latvia	0	0	1	1
27	Portugal	0	0	1	1
27	Slovakia	0	0	1	1
27	Slovenia	0	0	1	1
Totals (30 entries)		44	45	43	132

== Medal summary ==
=== Men ===
Event	Gold		Silver		Bronze	
100 metres	Jeff Erius; France	10.28	Nsikak Ekpo; Netherlands	10.30	Abel Jordán; Spain	10.31
200 metres	Blessing Afrifah; Israel	20.64	Damiano Dentato; Italy	20.69	Jaime Sancho; Spain	20.76
400 metres	Jonas Phijffers; Netherlands	44.82 CR, NU23R	Maksymilian Szwed; Poland	45.28	Brodie Young; Great Britain	45.34
800 metres	Niels Laros; Netherlands	1:44.36	Justin Davies; Great Britain	1:44.97	Giovanni Lazzaro; Italy	1:44.98
1500 metres	Stefan Nillessen; Netherlands	3:44.87	Paul Anselmini; France	3:45.35	Filip Rak; Poland	3:45.42
5000 metres	Niels Laros; Netherlands	13:44.74	Nick Griggs; Ireland	13:45.80	Will Barnicoat; Great Britain	13:46.11
10,000 metres	Joel Ibler Lillesø; Denmark	29:05.45 PB	Jonathan Grahn; Sweden	29:05.49 PB	Jaime Migallón; Spain	29:06.85
110 metres hurdles	Enzo Diessl; Austria	13.46	Zeno van Neygen; Belgium	13.54 PB	Elie Bacari; Belgium	13.56
400 metres hurdles	Owe Fischer-Breiholz; Germany	48.01 CR	Ismail Nezir; Turkey	48.33 PB	Matic Ian Gucek; Slovenia	48.34 =NR
3000 metres steeplechase	Maciej Megier; Poland	8:20.17 CR, PB	Stefan Nillessen; Netherlands	8:20.48 NU23R	Lourenço Rodrigues; Portugal	8:21.99 NU23R
4 × 100 metres relay	Maxime Rebierre; Yoran Kabengele Kabala; Mohammed Badru; Jeff Erius; Dejan Ottou*; France	38.43 CR, EU23R	Benedikt Thomas Wallstein; Jan Eric Frehe; Maurice Grahl; Heiko Gussmann; Germany	38.80 SB	Manuel Vilacha; Abel Jordan; Juan Carlos Castillo; Marc Escandell; Jaime Sancho*; Spain	38.86 NU23R
4 × 400 metres relay	David Garcia; Ángel González; Markel Fernandez; Gerson Pozo; Sergio Plata*; Spain	3:02.02 CR, EU23R	Felix Levasseur; Maxime Wassmer; Benoît Moudio Priso; Allan Lacroix; France	3:02.60 SB	Thorben Finke; Max Husemann; Lukas Krappe; Florian Kroll; Germany	3:02.83 NU23R
10,000 metres walk	Mazlum Demir; Turkey	39:45.84 PB	Emiliano Brigante; Italy	39:49.64	Frederick Weigel; Germany	40:00.90 PB
High jump	Matteo Sioli; Italy	2.30 m PB	Mikolaj Szczesny; Poland	2.26 m PB	Melwin Lycke Holm; Sweden	2.24 m PB
Pole vault	Simone Bertelli; Italy	5.70 m PB	Tristan Despres; France	5.60 m	Valters Kreišs; Latvia	5.60 m
Long jump	Erwan Konate; France	8.25 m NU23R	Bozhidar Sarâboyukov; Bulgaria	8.21 m SB	Kasperi Vehmaa; Finland	7.97 m =PB
Triple jump	Pablo Delgado; Spain	16.55 m PB	Lâchezar Vâlchev; Bulgaria	16.48 m PB	Federico Lorenzo Bruno; Italy	16.47 m SB
Shot put	Tizian Lauria; Germany	20.02 m	Leo Zikovic; Sweden	19.47 m PB	Yannick Rolvink; Netherlands	19.01 m
Discus throw	Steven Richter; Germany	64.67 m	Mika Sosna; Germany	63.42 m	Marius Karges; Germany	62.20 m
Javelin throw	Artur Felfner; Ukraine	81.14 m	Nick Thumm; Germany	80.74 m	Eemil Porvari; Finland	79.88 m
Hammer throw	Iosif Kesidis; Cyprus	74.87 m NU23R	Georgios Papanastasiou; Greece	72.98 m	Ioannis Korakidis; Greece	72.51 m
Decathlon	Andrin Huber; Switzerland	8188 pts PB	Jeff Tesselaar; Netherlands	8108 pts	Antoine Ferranti; France	8032 pts
WR world record | AR area record | CR championship record | GR games record | NR national record | OR Olympic record | PB personal best | SB season best | WL world leading (in a given season)

* Indicates the athletes only competed in the preliminary heats and received medals.

=== Women ===
Event	Gold		Silver		Bronze	
100 metres	Karolína Maňasová; Czech Republic	11.30	Nia Wedderburn-Goodison; Great Britain	11.38	Polyniki Emmanouilidou; Greece	11.44
200 metres	Success Eduan; Great Britain	22.74 SB	Henriette Jæger; Norway	22.78 SB	Nora Lindahl; Sweden	22.92 SB
400 metres	Henriette Jæger; Norway	49.74 CR	Yemi Mary John; Great Britain	50.50	Alexe Deau; France	50.94
800 metres	Audrey Werro; Switzerland	1:57.42 CR	Rocío Arroyo; Spain	1:59.18 NU23R	Abigail Ives; Great Britain	1:59.77
1500 metres	Dilek Koçak; Turkey	4:08.79 PB	Adèle Gay; France	4:08.99	Eimear Maher; Ireland	4:09.54
5000 metres	Maria Forero; Spain	15:43.44	Vanessa Mikitenko; Germany	15:51.97	Anika Thompson; Ireland	15:56.80
10,000 metres	Anika Thompson; Ireland	32:31.47 NU23R	Kira Weis; Germany	32:36.54	Carolina Schäfer; Germany	33:04.33
100 metres hurdles	Alicja Sielska; Poland	12.91	Anna Tóth; Hungary	13.02	Tereza Čorejová; Slovakia	13.05
400 metres hurdles	Emily Newnham; Great Britain	54.09 CR, PB	Vanessa Baldé; Germany	55.36	Vivienne Morgenstern; Germany	55.45
3000 metres steeplechase	Ilona Mononen; Finland	9:30.49	Marta Serrano; Spain	9:30.74	Adia Budde; Germany	9:32.14
4 × 100 metres relay	Nia Wedderburn-Goodison; Kissiwaa Mensah; Alyson Bell; Success Eduan; Faith Akinbileje*; Joy Eze*; Great Britain	42.92 CR, SB	Chloé Rabac; Emma van Camp; Fabienne Hoenke; Soraya Becerra; Iris Caligiuri*; Switzerland	43.39 NU23R	Viola John; Holly Okuku; Jolina Ernst; Chelsea Kadiri; Germany	43.75
4 × 400 metres relay	Rebecca Grieve; Emily Newnham; Poppy Malik; Yemi Mary John; Holly Mpassy*; Abigail Ives*; Great Britain	3:26.52 CR, EU23R	Natalia Rojas; Ana Prieto; Berta Segura; Rocio Arroyo; Elisa Lorenzo*; Spain	3:28.06 NU23R	Laure-Anne Faleme; Lou-Anne Pouzancre-Hoyer; Benedetta Kouakou; Alexe Déau; Léa Thery-Demarque*; Mathilde Descoux*; France	3:28.37 NU23R
10,000 metres walk	Alexandrina Mihai; Italy	43:49.55 PB	Ana Delahaie; France	44:07.59 PB	Giulia Gabriele; Italy	44:19.31
High jump	Angelina Topić; Serbia	1.95 m	Engla Nilsson; Sweden	1.93 m	Joana Herrmann; Germany	1.91 m
Pole vault	Viktorie Ondrová; Czech Republic	4.45 m PB	Rugilė Miklyčiūtė; Lithuania Chiara Sistermann; Germany	4.35 m NR 4.35 m =PB	Not awarded	
Long jump	Ramona Verman; Romania	6.60 m PB	Samira Attermeyer; Germany	6.58 m PB	Ida Andrea Breigan; Norway	6.58 m
Triple jump	Alexia Ioana Dospin; Romania	14.05 m PB	Clémence Rougier; France	13.93	Aleksandrija Mitrović; Serbia	13.84
Shot put	Nina Chioma Ndubuisi; Germany	17.73 m	Jolina Lange; Germany	17.04 m PB	Helena Kopp; Germany	16.90 PB
Discus throw	Inés López; Spain	58.20 m NU23R	Benedetta Benedetti; Italy	56.98 m PB	Milina Wepiwé; Germany	56.82 m
Javelin throw	Adriana Vilagoš; Serbia	62.41 m	Petra Sicaková; Czech Republic	58.14 m	Mira Lukas; Germany	57.22 m
Hammer throw	Aileen Kuhn; Germany	72.53 m PB	Nicola Tuthill; Ireland	70.90 m	Valentina Savva; Cyprus	70.22 m NR
Heptathlon	Saga Vanninen; Finland	6563 pts CR, NR	Abigail Pawlett; Great Britain	6320 pts PB	Serina Riedel; Germany	6183 pts
WR world record | AR area record | CR championship record | GR games record | NR national record | OR Olympic record | PB personal best | SB season best | WL world leading (in a given season)

* Indicates the athletes only competed in the preliminary heats and received medals.

== Entry standards ==
Event	Men	Quota	Women	Rounds
100 metres	10.48	32	11.68	3
200 metres	21.15	32	24.00	3
400 metres	46.90	32	55.00	3
800 metres	1:48.00	24	2:06.50	2
1500 metres	3:42.50	24	4:22.00	2
5000 metres	13:58.00	24	16:37.50	1
10,000 metres	29:40.00	24	35:30.00	1
110/100 metres hurdles	14.35	32	13.80	3
400 metres hurdles	52.50	32	1:00.00	3
3000 metres steeplechase	8:55.00	24	10:20.00	2
10,000 metres race walk	45:30.00	24	51:00.00	1
4 × 100 metres relay		16		2
4 × 400 metres relay		16		2
High jump	2.10 m (6 ft 10 1/2 in)	24	1.80 m (5 ft 10 3/4 in)	2
Pole vault	5.25 m (17 ft 2 1/2 in)	24	4.05 m (13 ft 3 1/4 in)	2
Long jump	7.55 m (24 ft 9 in)	24	6.35 m (20 ft 10 in)	2
Triple jump	15.50 m (50 ft 10 in)	24	13.10 m (42 ft 11 1/2 in)	2
Shot put	17.65 m (57 ft 10 3/4 in)	24	14.40 m (47 ft 2 3/4 in)	2
Discus throw	54.50 m (178 ft 9 1/2 in)	24	49.50 m (162 ft 4 3/4 in)	2
Hammer throw	65.00 m (213 ft 3 in)	24	60.50 m (198 ft 5 3/4 in)	2
Javelin throw	71.00 m (232 ft 11 1/4 in)	24	50.00 m (164 ft 1/2 in)	2
Decathlon/Heptathlon	7450	20	5650	1

== Participation ==
1,245 athletes from 40 nations are expected to compete at this edition.

- Andorra (1)
- Armenia (2)
- Austria (18)
- Belgium (28)
- Bosnia and Herzegovina (4)
- Bulgaria (7)
- Croatia (14)
- Cyprus (12)
- Czech Republic (40)
- Denmark (13)
- Estonia (17)
- Finland (51)
- France (78)
- Georgia (1)
- Germany (105)
- Great Britain (49)
- Greece (48)
- Hungary (38)
- Iceland (5)
- Ireland (40)
- Israel (10)
- Italy (90)
- Latvia (11)
- Liechtenstein (4)
- Lithuania (18)
- Luxembourg (2)
- Malta (2)
- Moldova (2)
- Montenegro (1)
- Netherlands (42)
- North Macedonia (1)
- Norway (51)
- Poland (60)
- Portugal (31)
- Romania (22)
- San Marino (2)
- Serbia (15)
- Slovakia (18)
- Slovenia (29)
- Spain (70)
- Sweden (55)
- Switzerland (61)
- Turkey (48)
- Ukraine (29)
