= 2025 European Athletics Indoor Championships – Women's 60 metres =

Women's 60 metres at the 2025 European Athletics Indoor Championships
- Venue: Omnisport Apeldoorn
- Location: Apeldoorn, Netherlands
- Dates: 9 March 2025
- Competitors: 40 from 25 nations
- Winning time: 7.01 WL, NR

Medalists
gold medal	Zaynab Dosso	Italy
silver medal	Mujinga Kambundji	Switzerland
bronze medal	Patrizia van der Weken	Luxembourg

The women's 60 metres at the 2025 European Athletics Indoor Championships was held on the short track of Omnisport in Apeldoorn, Netherlands, on 9 March 2025. This was 36th time the event was contested at the European Athletics Indoor Championships. Athletes can qualify by achieving the entry standard or by their World Athletics Ranking in the event.

== Background ==
The women's 60 metres was contested 35 times before 2025, at every previous edition of the European Athletics Indoor Championships (1970–2023), with the exception of 1972 and 1981, when the 50 metres was held instead. The 2025 European Athletics Indoor Championships will be held in Omnisport Apeldoorn in Apeldoorn, Netherlands. The removable indoor athletics track was retopped for these championships in September 2024.

Irina Privalova of Russia is the world and European record holder with a time of 6.92 s, set in both 1993 and 1995. The championship record of 7.00 s was set by Nelli Cooman of the Netherlands in 1986 and equalled by Mujinga Kambundji of Switzerland in 2023.

Records before the 2025 European Athletics Indoor Championships
Record	Athlete (nation)	Time (s)	Location	Date
World record	Irina Privalova (RUS)	6.92	Madrid, Spain	11 February 1993
European record	Irina Privalova (RUS)	6.92	Madrid, Spain	9 February 1995
Championship record	Nelli Cooman (NED)	7.00	Madrid, Spain	23 February 1986
Championship record	Mujinga Kambundji (SUI)	7.00	Istanbul, Turkey	3 March 2023
World leading	Jacious Sears (USA)	7.02	New York City, United States	8 February 2025
European leading	Mujinga Kambundji (SUI)	7.03	St. Gallen, Switzerland	22 February 2025

== Qualification ==
For the women's 60 metres, the qualification period runs from 25 February 2024 until 23 February 2025. Athletes can qualify by achieving the entry standards of 7.20 s indoors or 11.05 s over 100 metres outdoors. Athletes can also qualify by virtue of their World Athletics Ranking for the event. There is a target number of 40 athletes.

== Rounds ==
=== Round 1 ===
Round 1 was held on 9 March, starting at 12:00 (UTC+1) in the afternoon. First 4 in each heat (Q) and the next 4 by time (q) qualify for the semi-finals.

==== Heat 1 ====
Rank	Athlete	Nation	Time	Notes
1	Patrizia Van Der Weken	Luxembourg	7.11	Q
2	Bianca Williams	Great Britain	7.20 [.197]	Q
3	Sophia Junk	Germany	7.20 [.199]	Q, PB
4	Minke Bisschops	Netherlands	7.24	Q
5	Emma Van Camp	Switzerland	7.25	q
6	Maja Mihalinec Zidar	Slovenia	7.27	SB
7	Dimitra Tsoukala	Greece	7.39	
8	Milana Tirnanić	Serbia	7.41	

==== Heat 2 ====
Rank	Athlete	Nation	Time	Notes
1	Mujinga Kambundji	Switzerland	7.19	Q
2	Lorène Dorcas Bazolo	Portugal	7.22	Q
3	Lisa Mayer	Germany	7.24	Q
4	Gloria Hooper	Italy	7.25	Q, PB
5	Delphine Nkansa	Belgium	7.28	
6	Aleksandra Piotrowska	Poland	7.30	=SB
7	Isabel van den Berg	Netherlands	7.32	
8	Lika Kharchilava	Georgia	7.76	PB

==== Heat 3 ====
Rank	Athlete	Nation	Time	Notes
1	Boglárka Takács	Hungary	7.15	Q, NR
2	Maria Isabel Pérez	Spain	7.17	Q
3	Joy Eze	Great Britain	7.20	Q
4	Viktória Forster	Slovakia	7.27	Q, SB
5	Alexandra Burghardt	Germany	7.31	
6	Marije Van Hunenstijn	Netherlands	7.33	SB
7	Olivia Fotopoulou	Cyprus	7.36	
8	Diana Honcharenko	Ukraine	7.48	

==== Heat 4 ====
Rank	Athlete	Nation	Time	Notes
1	Zaynab Dosso	Italy	7.06	Q
2	Karolína Maňasová	Czech Republic	7.14	Q, EU23R
3	Carolle Zahi	France	7.15	Q, SB
4	Amy Hunt	Great Britain	7.17	Q, PB
5	Polyniki Emmanouilidou	Greece	7.18	q, PB
6	Maria Mihalache	Romania	7.26	q, PB
7	Ann Marii Kivikas	Estonia	7.29	PB
8	Thea Parnis Coleiro	Malta	7.61	PB

==== Heat 5 ====
Rank	Athlete	Nation	Time	Notes
1	Ewa Swoboda	Poland	7.14	Q
2	Rani Rosius	Belgium	7.16	Q, SB
3	Géraldine Frey	Switzerland	7.19	Q
4	Jaël Bestué	Spain	7.25	Q
5	Julia Henriksson	Sweden	7.27	q, SB
6	Arianna De Masi	Italy	7.31	
7	Magdalena Lindner	Austria	7.33	SB
8	Rafailia Spanoudaki-Chatziriga	Greece	7.41	

=== Semi-finals ===
The semi-finals were held on 9 March, starting at 16:05 (UTC+1) in the afternoon. First 2 in each heat (Q) and the next 2 by time (q) qualify for the final.

==== Heat 1 ====
Rank	Athlete	Nation	Time	Notes
1	Mujinga Kambundji	Switzerland	7.04	Q
2	Patrizia Van Der Weken	Luxembourg	7.06	Q, NR
3	Amy Hunt	Great Britain	7.09	q, PB
4	Maria Isabel Pérez	Spain	7.17	
5	Carolle Zahi	France	7.19	
6	Sophia Junk	Germany	7.21	
7	Maria Mihalache	Romania	7.26	=PB
8	Viktória Forster	Slovakia	7.28	

==== Heat 2 ====
Rank	Athlete	Nation	Time	Notes
1	Zaynab Dosso	Italy	7.03	Q, =EL
2	Rani Rosius	Belgium	7.08	Q, NR
3	Karolína Maňasová	Czech Republic	7.10	q, EU23R, NR
4	Géraldine Frey	Switzerland	7.13	SB
5	Minke Bisschops	Netherlands	7.17	PB
6	Jaël Bestué	Spain	7.22	
7	Joy Eze	Great Britain	7.25	
8	Julia Henriksson	Sweden	7.26	SB

==== Heat 3 ====
Rank	Athlete	Nation	Time	Notes
1	Boglárka Takács	Hungary	7.09	Q, NR
2	Ewa Swoboda	Poland	7.12	Q
3	Bianca Williams	Great Britain	7.17	
4	Lorène Dorcas Bazolo	Portugal	7.21	
5	Polyniki Emmanouilidou	Greece	7.22	
6	Emma Van Camp	Switzerland	7.24	
7	Gloria Hooper	Italy	7.28	
8	Lisa Mayer	Germany	7.49	

=== Final ===
The final was held on 9 March, starting at 18:37 (UTC+1) in the evening.

Rank	Athlete	Nation	Time	Notes
1st place, gold medalist(s)	Zaynab Dosso	Italy	7.01	WL, NR
2nd place, silver medalist(s)	Mujinga Kambundji	Switzerland	7.02	SB
3rd place, bronze medalist(s)	Patrizia Van Der Weken	Luxembourg	7.06	NR
4	Ewa Swoboda	Poland	7.07	SB
5	Rani Rosius	Belgium	7.10 [.091]	
6	Amy Hunt	Great Britain	7.10 [.100]	
7	Boglárka Takács	Hungary	7.12	
8	Karolína Maňasová	Czech Republic	7.14	
