= 2023 World Athletics Championships – Women's 200 metres =

Athletics event

Women's 200 metres at the 2023 World Championships
- Venue: National Athletics Centre
- Dates: 23 August (heats); 24 August (semi-finals); 25 August (final)
- Winning time: 21.41 CR

Medalists
gold medal	Shericka Jackson	Jamaica
silver medal	Gabrielle Thomas	United States
bronze medal	Sha'Carri Richardson	United States

The women's 200 metres at the 2023 World Athletics Championships was held at the National Athletics Centre in Budapest from 23 to 25 August 2022.

== Summary ==
All the expected finalists qualified. The structure of the semis didn't make it easy. The third semi was loaded with the defending champion, Shericka Jackson, the newly crowned 100 metres champion, Sha'Carri Richardson, and perennial finalist, 2017 silver medalist Marie-Josée Ta Lou. With only two automatic qualifying spots, something had to give. Ta Lou had to get one of the time qualifying spots and was relegated to lane 2 in the final.

In the final, the staggers mostly held true halfway through the turn, then Jackson began to edge forward with Dina Asher-Smith and Gabrielle Thomas showing a slight advantage. As they reached the straightaway, Jackson had a clear 2 metre lead with Thomas just barely ahead of Richardson, Asher-Smith, Julien Alfred and Daryll Neita. Jackson continued to power away, the winner was not going to be in doubt. Thomas separated, with Richardson also moving forward. Jackson let off the gas a couple of steps before the finish line, her time of 21.41 improved her standing as #2 performer of all time, just .07 short of Florence Griffith-Joyner's 35 year old world record. Thomas followed 4 metres later, a step ahead of now double medalist at these championships, Richardson.

== Records ==
Before the competition records were as follows:

Record	Athlete & Nat.	Perf.	Location	Date
World record	Florence Griffith-Joyner (USA)	21.34	Seoul, South Korea	29 September 1988
Championship record	Shericka Jackson (JAM)	21.45	Eugene, United States	21 July 2022
World Leading	Gabrielle Thomas (USA)	21.60	Eugene, United States	9 July 2023
African Record	Christine Mboma (NAM)	21.78	Zürich, Switzerland	9 September 2021
Asian Record	Li Xuemei (CHN)	22.01	Shanghai, China	22 October 1997
North, Central American and Caribbean record	Florence Griffith-Joyner (USA)	21.34	Seoul, South Korea	29 September 1988
South American Record	Vitoria Cristina Rosa (BRA)	22.47	Eugene, United States	19 July 2022
European Record	Dafne Schippers (NED)	21.63	Beijing, China	28 August 2015
Oceanian record	Melinda Gainsford (AUS)	22.23	Stuttgart, Germany	13 July 1997

== Qualification standard ==
The standard to qualify automatically for entry was 22.60.

== Schedule ==
The event schedule, in local time (UTC+2), was as follows:

Date	Time	Round
23 August	11:20	Heats
24 August	19:45	Semi-finals
25 August	21:40	Final

== Results ==
=== Heats ===
The first 3 athletes in each heat (Q) and the next 6 fastest (q) qualify for the semi-finals.

Wind:
Heat 1: -0.4 m/s, Heat 2: -0.7 m/s, Heat 3: -0.4 m/s, Heat 4: -0.4 m/s, Heat 5: -1.3 m/s, Heat 6: -0.3 m/s

Rank	Heat	Name	Nationality	Time	Notes
1	2	Sha'Carri Richardson	United States	22.16	Q
2	5	Gabrielle Thomas	United States	22.26	Q
3	2	Marie-Josée Ta Lou	Ivory Coast	22.26	Q, SB
4	1	Anthonique Strachan	Bahamas	22.31	Q
5	4	Julien Alfred	Saint Lucia	22.31	Q
6	1	Daryll Neita	Great Britain & N.I.	22.39	Q
7	4	Natalliah Whyte	Jamaica	22.44	Q
8	6	Dina Asher-Smith	Great Britain & N.I.	22.46	Q
9	5	Kevona Davis	Jamaica	22.49	Q
10	3	Shericka Jackson	Jamaica	22.51	Q
11	6	Maboundou Koné	Ivory Coast	22.55	Q
12	3	Veronica Shanti Pereira	Singapore	22.57	Q, NR
13	1	Jaël Bestué	Spain	22.58	Q
14	6	Kayla White	United States	22.62	Q
15	2	Olivia Fotopoulou	Cyprus	22.65	Q, PB
16	1	Favour Ofili	Nigeria	22.66	q
17	6	Dalia Kaddari	Italy	22.67	q, SB
18	4	Bianca Williams	Great Britain & N.I.	22.67	Q
19	3	Jessika Gbai	Ivory Coast	22.78	Q
20	3	Adaejah Hodge	British Virgin Islands	22.82	q
21	6	Krystsina Tsimanouskaya	Poland	22.88	q
22	5	Tasa Jiya	Netherlands	22.97	Q
23	2	Polyniki Emmanoulidou	Greece	23.00	q
24	4	Gina Bass	Gambia	23.02	q
25	2	Ashanti Moore	Jamaica	23.12	
26	2	Lorène Dorcas Bazolo	Portugal	23.13	
27	1	Léonie Pointet	Switzerland	23.16	PB
28	1	Yunisleidy García	Cuba	23.22	
29	5	Boglárka Takács	Hungary	23.24	
30	5	Cecilia Tamayo-Garza	Mexico	23.25	
31	5	Martyna Kotwiła	Poland	23.34	
32	4	Georgia Hulls	New Zealand	23.36	
33	3	Susanne Walli	Austria	23.38	
34	1	Ana Carolina Azevedo	Brazil	23.45	
35	3	Alexa Sulyán	Hungary	23.47	
36	1	Aino Pulkkinen	Finland	23.48	
37	6	Remi Tsuruta	Japan	23.49	
38	3	Nicole Caicedo	Ecuador	23.51	
39	2	Anniina Kortetmaa	Finland	23.52	
40	4	Julia Henriksson	Sweden	23.55	
41	5	Christine Bjelland Jensen	Norway	23.62	
42	2	Gorete Semedo	São Tomé and Príncipe	23.69	SB
43	6	Rhoda Njobvu	Zambia	23.82	
44	6	Vitoria Cristina Rosa	Brazil	23.86	
	4	Ella Connolly	Australia	DNS	

=== Semi-finals ===
The first 2 athletes in each heat (Q) and the next 2 fastest (q) qualify for the final.

Rank	Heat	Name	Nationality	Time	Notes
1	1	Gabrielle Thomas	United States	21.97	Q
2	3	Shericka Jackson	Jamaica	22.00	Q
3	2	Julien Alfred	Saint Lucia	22.17	Q
4	3	Sha'Carri Richardson	United States	22.20	Q
5	2	Daryll Neita	Great Britain & N.I.	22.21	Q, PB
6	3	Marie-Josée Ta Lou	Ivory Coast	22.26	q, SB
7	1	Dina Asher-Smith	Great Britain & N.I.	22.28	Q
8	2	Anthonique Strachan	Bahamas	22.30	q
9	2	Kayla White	United States	22.34	
10	2	Kevona Davis	Jamaica	22.34	
11	3	Bianca Williams	Great Britain & N.I.	22.45	PB
12	1	Natalliah Whyte	Jamaica	22.52	
13	3	Jaël Bestué	Spain	22.60	
14	1	Tasa Jiya	Netherlands	22.67	PB
15	1	Olivia Fotopoulou	Cyprus	22.73	
16	1	Dalia Kaddari	Italy	22.75	
17	3	Veronica Shanti Pereira	Singapore	22.79	
18	3	Favour Ofili	Nigeria	22.86	
19	2	Jessika Gbai	Ivory Coast	22.88	
20	2	Adaejah Hodge	British Virgin Islands	22.96	
21	3	Gina Bass	Gambia	23.10	
22	1	Polyniki Emmanoulidou	Greece	23.15	
23	2	Krystsina Tsimanouskaya	Poland	23.34	
	1	Maboundou Koné	Ivory Coast	DQ	TR17.3.1

=== Final ===
The final started at 21:42 on 25 August. The results were as follows:

Wind: +0.1 m/s

Rank	Lane	Name	Nationality	Time	Notes
1st place, gold medalist(s)	6	Shericka Jackson	Jamaica	21.41	CR, NR
2nd place, silver medalist(s)	8	Gabrielle Thomas	United States	21.81	
3rd place, bronze medalist(s)	9	Sha'Carri Richardson	United States	21.92	PB
4	7	Julien Alfred	Saint Lucia	22.05	
5	5	Daryll Neita	Great Britain & N.I.	22.16	PB
6	3	Anthonique Strachan	Bahamas	22.29	
7	4	Dina Asher-Smith	Great Britain & N.I.	22.34	
8	2	Marie-Josée Ta Lou	Ivory Coast	22.64	
