= 2022 European Athletics Championships – Women's 200 metres =

Women's 200 metres at the 2022 European Athletics Championships
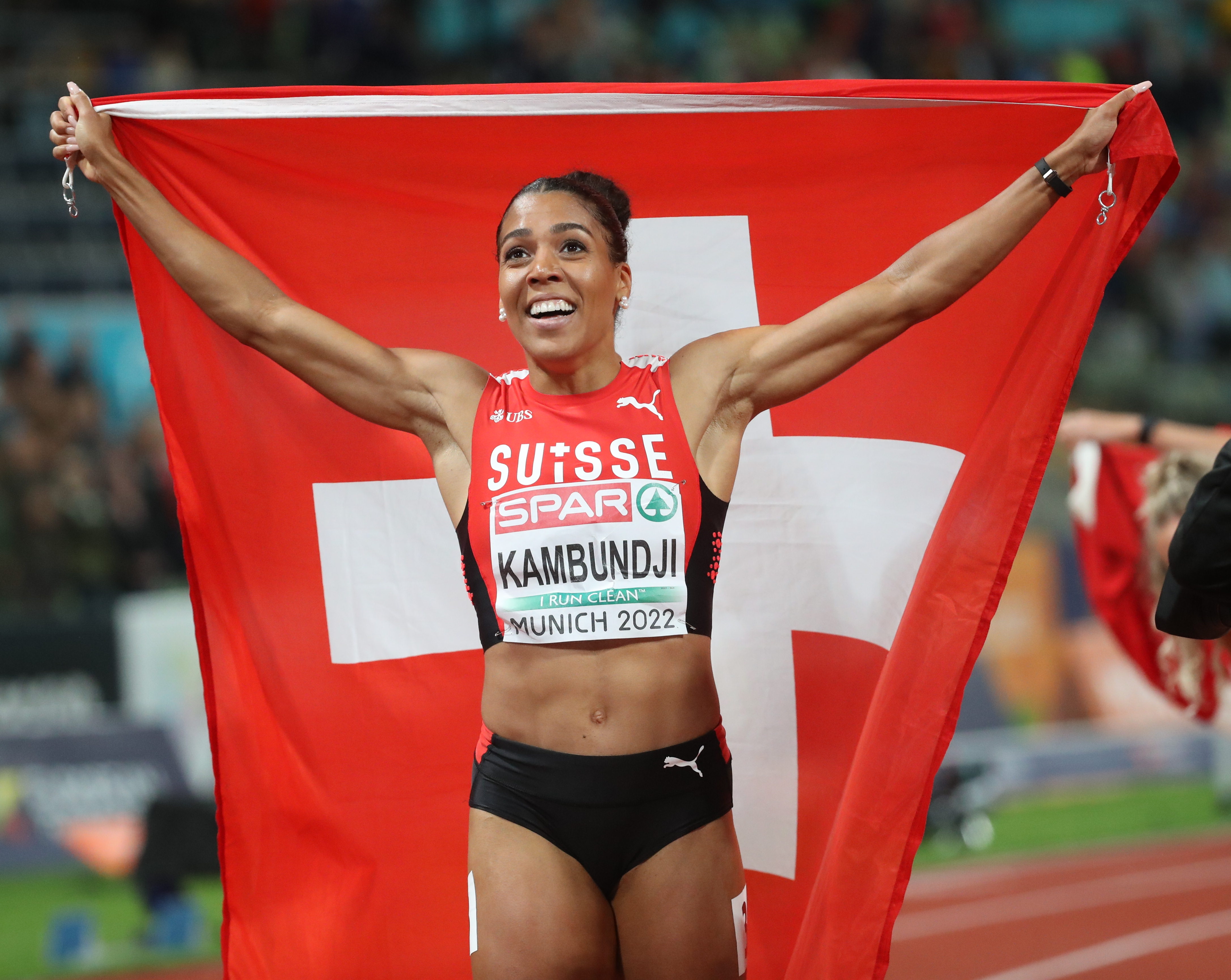
- Venue: Olympiastadion
- Location: Munich
- Dates: 18 August (round 1 and semifinals); 19 August (final)
- Competitors: 32 from 18 nations
- Winning time: 22.32

Medalists
gold medal	Mujinga Kambundji	Switzerland
silver medal	Dina Asher-Smith	Great Britain
bronze medal	Ida Karstoft	Denmark

The women's 200 metres at the 2022 European Athletics Championships took place at the Olympiastadion on 18 and 19 August.

== Records ==
Standing records prior to the 2022 European Athletics Championships
World record	Florence Griffith-Joyner (USA)	21.34	Seoul, South Korea	29 September 1988
European record	Dafne Schippers (NED)	21.63	Beijing, China	21 August 2015
Championship record	Heike Drechsler (GDR)	21.71	Stuttgart, West Germany	29 August 1986
World Leading	Shericka Jackson (JAM)	21.45	Eugene, Oregon, United States	21 July 2022
Europe Leading	Dina Asher-Smith (GBR)	21.96	Eugene, Oregon, United States	19 July 2022

== Schedule ==
Date	Time	Round
18 August 2022	13:05	Round 1
18 August 2022	20:54	Semifinals
19 August 2022	22:22	Final

All times are local times (UTC+2)

== Results ==
=== Round 1 ===
First 4 in each heat (Q) and the next 4 fastest (q) advance to the Semifinals. The 8 highest ranked athletes received a bye into the semi-finals

Wind:
Heat 1: +0.3 m/s, Heat 2: +0.9 m/s, Heat 3: +0.5 m/s

Rank	Heat	Lane	Name	Nationality	Time	Note
1	1	2	Jodie Williams	Great Britain	22.92	Q, SB
2	3	5	Shana Grebo	France	23.00	Q
3	2	4	Jamile Samuel	Netherlands	23.00	Q
4	3	6	Imke Vervaet	Belgium	23.05	Q, =PB
5	1	5	Delphine Nkansa	Belgium	23.08	Q
6	2	6	Lorène Bazolo	Portugal	23.12	Q
7	2	8	Jessica-Bianca Wessolly	Germany	23.14	Q, SB
8	3	2	Alexandra Burghardt	Germany	23.16	Q
9	3	7	Lisa Lilja	Sweden	23.20	Q
10	1	8	Gémima Joseph	France	23.21	Q
11	3	4	Nikola Horowska	Poland	23.32	q
12	3	6	Irene Siragusa	Italy	23.36	q
13	1	8	Artemis Melina Anastasiou	Greece	23.38	Q
14	3	8	Léonie Pointet	Switzerland	23.39	q
15	2	2	Olivia Fotopoulou	Cyprus	23.40	Q
16	1	3	Susanne Walli	Austria	23.45	q
17	1	1	Marika Popowicz-Drapała	Poland	23.47	
18	2	5	Anniina Kortetmaa	Finland	23.60	
19	2	7	Julia Henriksson	Sweden	23.62	
20	1	4	Vittoria Fontana	Italy	23.63	
21	2	3	Lucía Carrillo	Spain	23.64	
22	3	1	Elisabeth Slettum	Norway	23.67	
23	1	7	Martina Hofmanová	Czech Republic	23.73	
	2	1	Beth Dobbin	Great Britain	DQ	TR16.8

=== Semifinals ===
The twelve qualifiers from round 1 are joined by the eight highest ranked athletes who received a bye.

First 2 in each semifinal (Q) and the next 2 fastest (q) advance to the Final.

Wind:
Heat 1: -0.3 m/s, Heat 2: 0.0 m/s, Heat 3: +0.3 m/s

Rank	Heat	Lane	Name	Nationality	Time	Note
1	2	4	Dina Asher-Smith	Great Britain	22.53	Q
2	1	6	Ida Karstoft	Denmark	22.73	Q
3	3	3	Mujinga Kambundji	Switzerland	22.76	Q
4	2	3	Lieke Klaver	Netherlands	22.92	Q
5	1	3	Jodie Williams	Great Britain	23.03	Q
6	2	7	Alexandra Burghardt	Germany	23.05	q
7	2	6	Dalia Kaddari	Italy	23.06	q
8	1	4	Jamile Samuel	Netherlands	23.13	
9	3	5	Shana Grebo	France	23.13	Q
10	3	6	Paula Sevilla	Spain	23.19	
11	3	3	Delphine Nkansa	Belgium	23.28	
12	1	7	Olivia Fotopoulou	Cyprus	23.33	
13	2	8	Gémima Joseph	France	23.36	
14	2	1	Lorène Dorcas Bazolo	Portugal	23.43	
15	1	5	Corinna Schwab	Germany	23.44	
16	3	8	Irene Siragusa	Italy	23.46	
17	3	2	Jessica-Bianca Wessolly	Germany	23.47	
18	1	8	Imke Vervaet	Belgium	23.48	
19	2	2	Artemis Melina Anastasiou	Greece	23.60	
20	2	5	Nikola Horowska	Poland	23.62	
21	3	1	Susanne Walli	Austria	23.73	
22	1	2	Léonie Pointet	Switzerland	23.77	
23	1	1	Lisa Lilja	Sweden	23.96	
	3	4	Daryll Neita	Great Britain	DNS	

=== Final ===
Olympiastadion - 19 Aug - 22:22

Rank	Lane	Name	Nationality	Time	Note
1st place, gold medalist(s)	3	Mujinga Kambundji	Switzerland	22.32	
2nd place, silver medalist(s)	5	Dina Asher-Smith	Great Britain	22.43	
3rd place, bronze medalist(s)	6	Ida Karstoft	Denmark	22.72	
4	8	Jodie Williams	Great Britain	22.85	SB
5	4	Lieke Klaver	Netherlands	22.88	
6	7	Shana Grebo	France	23.06	
7	2	Dalia Kaddari	Italy	23.19	
8	1	Alexandra Burghardt	Germany	23.24	
