= 2023 European Athletics Indoor Championships – Women's 60 metres =

Women's 60 metres at the 2023 European Athletics Indoor Championships
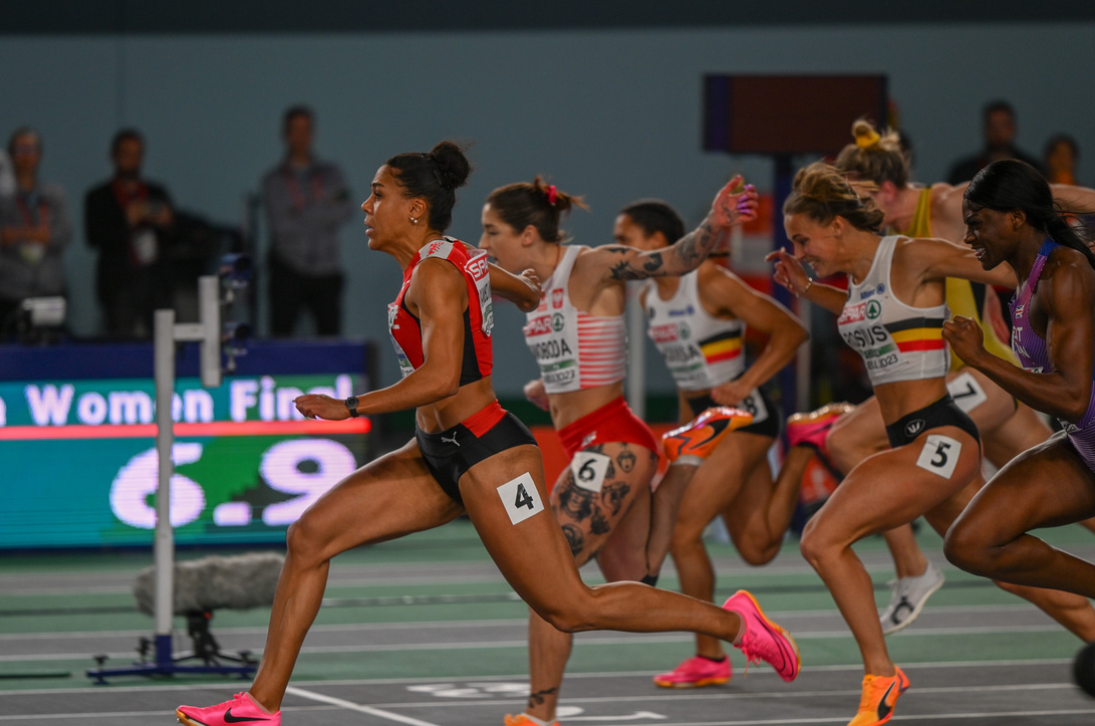
- The finish of the final.
- Venue: Ataköy Athletics Arena
- Location: Istanbul, Turkey
- Dates: 3 March 2023
- Competitors: 37 from 24 nations
- Winning time: 7.00 =CR

Medalists
gold medal	Mujinga Kambundji	Switzerland
silver medal	Ewa Swoboda	Poland
bronze medal	Daryll Neita	Great Britain

The women's 60 metres event at the 2023 European Athletics Indoor Championships was held on 3 March 2023 at 12:05 (heats), at 19:05 (semi-finals) and at 21:45 (final) local time.

== Records ==
Standing records prior to the 2023 European Athletics Indoor Championships
World record	Irina Privalova (RUS)	6.92	Madrid, Spain	11 February 1993
European record	Irina Privalova (RUS)	6.92	Madrid, Spain	9 February 1995
Championship record	Nelli Cooman (NED)	7.00	Madrid, Spain	23 February 1986
World Leading	Aleia Hobbs (USA)	6.94	Albuquerque, United States	18 February 2023
European Leading	Mujinga Kambundji (SUI)	7.03	St. Gallen, Switzerland	18 February 2023

== Results ==
=== Heats ===
Qualification: First 4 in each heat (Q) and the next 4 fastest (q) advance to the Semifinals.

Rank	Heat	Athlete	Nationality	Time	Note
1	1	Ewa Swoboda	Poland	7.11	Q
2	2	Daryll Neita	Great Britain	7.14	Q
3	4	Mujinga Kambundji	Switzerland	7.18	Q
4	1	Rani Rosius	Belgium	7.22	Q
5	4	Delphine Nkansa	Belgium	7.22	Q
6	5	Arialis Martinez	Portugal	7.24	Q
7	2	Alexandra Burghardt	Germany	7.24	Q
8	1	Polyniki Emmanouilidou	Greece	7.26	Q, PB
9	3	Patrizia van der Weken	Luxembourg	7.26	Q, =SB
10	5	Melissa Gutschmidt	Switzerland	7.27	Q
11	3	Jaël Bestué	Spain	7.30	Q
12	4	Rosalina Santos	Portugal	7.30	Q
13	1	Sarah Atcho	Switzerland	7.30	Q
14	3	Õilme Võro	Estonia	7.31	Q, PB
15	5	Lisa Mayer	Germany	7.31	Q
16	2	Olivia Fotopoulou	Cyprus	7.32	Q
17	2	Lorène Dorcas Bazolo	Portugal	7.32	Q
18	3	Magdalena Stefanowicz	Poland	7.32	Q
19	1	Julia Henriksson	Sweden	7.33	q
20	4	Irene Siragusa	Italy	7.35	Q
21	1	Anna Bongiorni	Italy	7.36	q
22	5	Asha Philip	Great Britain	7.36	Q
23	3	N'Ketia Seedo	Netherlands	7.37	q
24	2	Martyna Kotwiła	Poland	7.38	q
25	5	Gloria Hooper	Italy	7.39	
26	4	Joan Healy	Ireland	7.41	
27	5	Milana Tirnanić	Serbia	7.42	
28	5	Boglárka Takács	Hungary	7.42	
29	2	Rafalia Spanoudaki-Chatziriga	Greece	7.43	
30	4	Magdalena Lindner	Austria	7.44	
31	3	Jusztina Csóti	Hungary	7.45	
32	2	Viktória Forster	Slovakia	7.51	
33	1	Anna Pursiainen	Finland	7.52	
34	4	Guðbjörg Jóna Bjarnadóttir	Iceland	7.56	
35	3	Alessandra Gasparelli	San Marino	7.63	
36	5	Carla Scicluna	Malta	7.72	SB
37	3	Charlotte Afriat	Monaco	8.13	

=== Semifinals ===
Qualification: First 2 in each heat (Q) and the next 2 fastest (q) advance to the Final.

Rank	Heat	Athlete	Nationality	Time	Note
1	3	Mujinga Kambundji	Switzerland	7.05	Q
2	2	Daryll Neita	Great Britain	7.07	Q
3	1	Ewa Swoboda	Poland	7.10	Q
4	1	Rani Rosius	Belgium	7.16	Q, PB
5	3	Delphine Nkansa	Belgium	7.22	Q
6	2	Alexandra Burghardt	Germany	7.23	Q
7	3	Jaël Bestué	Spain	7.23	q
8	3	Arialis Martinez	Portugal	7.24	q
9	2	Sarah Atcho	Switzerland	7.26	
10	2	Patrizia van der Weken	Luxembourg	7.27	
10	3	Lisa Mayer	Germany	7.27	
12	1	Õilme Võro	Estonia	7.29	=NR
13	1	Melissa Gutschmidt	Switzerland	7.30	
14	2	N'Ketia Seedo	Netherlands	7.32	
15	3	Magdalena Stefanowicz	Poland	7.32	
16	2	Martyna Kotwiła	Poland	7.33	
17	2	Lorène Dorcas Bazolo	Portugal	7.34	
18	2	Polyniki Emmanouilidou	Greece	7.34	
19	3	Julia Henriksson	Sweden	7.34	
20	1	Rosalina Santos	Portugal	7.35	
21	1	Asha Philip	Great Britain	7.35	
22	1	Olivia Fotopoulou	Cyprus	7.36	
23	1	Irene Siragusa	Italy	7.39	
24	3	Anna Bongiorni	Italy	7.39	

=== Final ===
Rank	Lane	Athlete	Nationality	Time	Note
1st place, gold medalist(s)	4	Mujinga Kambundji	Switzerland	7.00	=CR
2nd place, silver medalist(s)	6	Ewa Swoboda	Poland	7.09	=SB
3rd place, bronze medalist(s)	3	Daryll Neita	Great Britain	7.12	
4	5	Rani Rosius	Belgium	7.15	PB
5	2	Arialis Martinez	Portugal	7.17	=NR
6	8	Delphine Nkansa	Belgium	7.19	PB
7	7	Alexandra Burghardt	Germany	7.24	
8	1	Jaël Bestué	Spain	7.28	
