= 2024 European Athletics Championships – Women's 100 metres =

Event at European Athletics Championships

Women's 100 metres at the 2024 European Athletics Championships
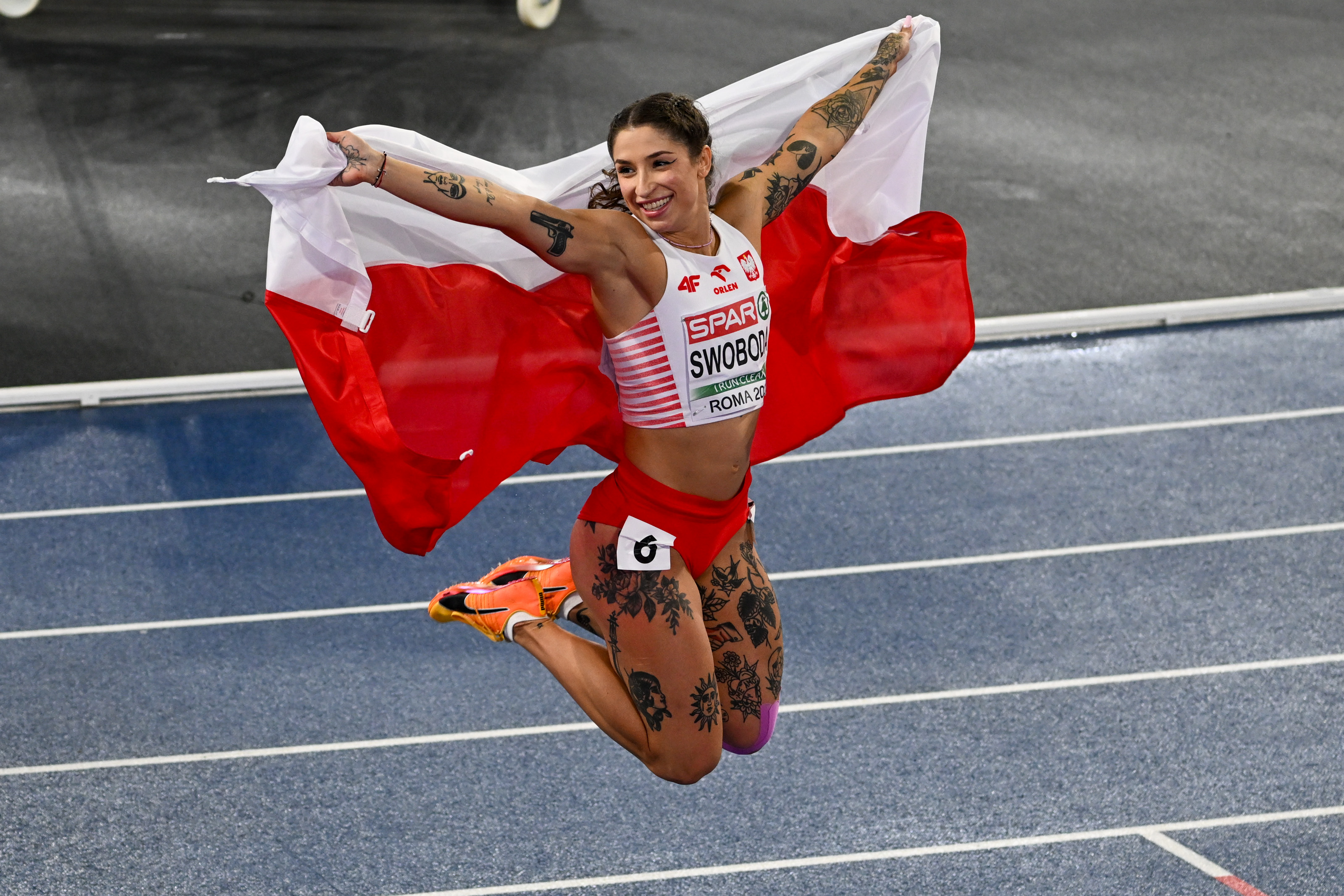
- The silver medal winner Ewa Swoboda
- Venue: Stadio Olimpico
- Location: Rome
- Dates: 8 June (round 1); 9 June (semifinals & final)
- Competitors: 33 from 22 nations
- Winning time: 10.99

Medalists
gold medal	Dina Asher-Smith	Great Britain
silver medal	Ewa Swoboda	Poland
bronze medal	Zaynab Dosso	Italy

The women's 100 metres at the 2024 European Athletics Championships took place at the Stadio Olimpico on 8 and 9 June.

== Records ==
Standing records prior to the 2024 European Athletics Championships
World record	Florence Griffith-Joyner (USA)	10.49	Indianapolis, United States	16 July 1988
European record	Christine Arron (FRA)	10.73	Budapest, Hungary	19 August 1998
Championship record	Christine Arron (FRA)	10.73	Budapest, Hungary	19 August 1998
World Leading	Jacious Sears (USA)	10.77	Gainesville, United States	13 April 2024
Europe Leading	Daryll Neita (GBR)	10.98	Doha, Qatar	10 May 2024
Europe Leading	Dina Asher-Smith (GBR)	10.98	Eugene, United States	25 May 2024

== Schedule ==
Date	Time	Round
8 June 2024	10:50	Round 1
9 June 2024	21:05	Semifinals
9 June 2024	22:53	Final

All times are local times (UTC+2)

== Results ==
=== Round 1 ===
The next 14 fastest (q) advanced to the semifinals. The 10 highest ranked athletes received a bye into the semifinals.

Wind:
Heat 1: +0.6 m/s, Heat 2: +0.4 m/s, Heat 3: +0.1 m/s

Rank	Heat	Lane	Name	Nationality	Time	Note
1	1	7	Rani Rosius	Belgium	11.20	q, SB
2	2	7	Lisa Mayer	Germany	11.20	q
3	3	2	Polyniki Emmanoulidou	Greece	11.21	q, =PB
4	1	5	Géraldine Frey	Switzerland	11.25	q
5	3	3	Amy Hunt	Great Britain	11.26	q
6	1	8	Olivia Fotopoulou	Cyprus	11.27	q
7	2	6	Delphine Nkansa	Belgium	11.28	q, SB
8	1	4	Jennifer Montag	Germany	11.31	q, SB
9	3	4	Julia Henriksson	Sweden	11.31	q
10	1	2	Lotta Kemppinen	Finland	11.32	q, PB
11	2	8	Anna Bongiorni	Italy	11.35	q, SB
12	1	6	Lorène Dorcas Bazolo	Portugal	11.35	q
13	2	9	María Isabel Pérez	Spain	11.41	q
14	3	8	Karolína Maňasová	Czech Republic	11.45	q
15	2	3	Dimitra Tsoukala	Greece	11.48	R
16	3	5	Viktória Forster	Slovakia	11.50	R
17	3	7	Magdalena Lindner	Austria	11.52	
18	1	9	Alessandra Gasparelli	San Marino	11.60	=SB
19	3	6	Rosalina Santos	Portugal	11.62	
20	2	5	Ivana Ilić	Serbia	11.62	
21	2	4	Arialis Gandulla	Portugal	11.65	SB
22	1	3	Gayane Chiloyan	Armenia	11.98	
23	2	2	Marie-Charlotte Gastaud	Monaco	12.52	=PB

=== Semifinals ===
The first 2 in each heat (Q) and the next 2 fastest (q) advance to the final.

Wind:
Heat 1: +0.7 m/s, Heat 2: +0.3 m/s, Heat 3: +2.0 m/s

Rank	Heat	Lane	Name	Nationality	Time	Note
1	2	5	Dina Asher-Smith*	Great Britain	10.96	Q, EL
2	3	5	Patrizia van der Weken*	Luxembourg	11.00	Q, NR
3	3	6	Zaynab Dosso*	Italy	11.01	Q, NR
4	1	6	Ewa Swoboda*	Poland	11.02	Q, SB
5	1	5	Gina Lückenkemper*	Germany	11.06	Q, =SB
6	2	7	Gémima Joseph*	France	11.06	Q
7	2	6	Mujinga Kambundji*	Switzerland	11.09	q, SB
8	1	4	Amy Hunt	Great Britain	11.13	q
9	3	7	Boglárka Takács*	Hungary	11.16	
10	3	9	Karolína Maňasová	Czech Republic	11.17	NU23R
11	1	8	Polyniki Emmanoulidou	Greece	11.21	
12	2	8	Delphine Nkansa	Belgium	11.21	PB
13	1	3	Rani Rosius	Belgium	11.25	
14	3	3	Julia Henriksson	Sweden	11.27	
15	3	4	Salomé Kora*	Switzerland	11.29	
16	1	7	Géraldine Frey	Switzerland	11.29	
17	2	9	Lorène Dorcas Bazolo	Portugal	11.32	
18	1	9	Anna Bongiorni	Italy	11.32	SB
19	2	4	Rebekka Haase*	Germany	11.35	
20	1	2	Olivia Fotopoulou	Cyprus	11.40	
21	2	3	María Isabel Pérez	Spain	11.41	
22	2	2	Lotta Kemppinen	Finland	11.44	
23	3	8	Dimitra Tsoukala	Greece	11.44	
	3	2	Viktória Forster	Slovakia	DNS	
	3	8	Lisa Mayer	Germany	DNS	
	3	2	Jennifer Montag	Germany	DNS	

*Athletes that received a bye into the semifinal

=== Final ===
Wind: +0.7 m/s

Rank	Lane	Name	Nationality	Time	Note
1st place, gold medalist(s)	4	Dina Asher-Smith	Great Britain	10.99	
2nd place, silver medalist(s)	6	Ewa Swoboda	Poland	11.03	
3rd place, bronze medalist(s)	5	Zaynab Dosso	Italy	11.03	
4	7	Patrizia van der Weken	Luxembourg	11.04	
5	8	Gina Lückenkemper	Germany	11.07	
6	3	Gémima Joseph	France	11.08	
7	2	Amy Hunt	Great Britain	11.15	
8	9	Mujinga Kambundji	Switzerland	11.15	
