= 2025 World Athletics Indoor Championships – Women's 60 metres =

Women's 60 metres at the 2025 World Athletics Indoor Championships
- Venue: Nanjing's Cube at Nanjing Youth Olympic Sports Park
- Location: Nanjing, China
- Dates: 22 March
- Winning time: 7.04

Medalists
gold medal	Mujinga Kambundji	Switzerland
silver medal	Zaynab Dosso	Italy
bronze medal	Patrizia van der Weken	Luxembourg

The women's 60 metres at the 2025 World Athletics Indoor Championships took place on the short track of the Nanjing's Cube at Nanjing Youth Olympic Sports Park in Nanjing, China, on 22 March 2025. This was the 21st time the event was contested at the World Athletics Indoor Championships. Athletes could qualify by achieving the entry standard or by their World Athletics Ranking in the event.

== Background ==
The women's 60 metres was contested 20 times before 2025, at every previous edition of the World Athletics Indoor Championships.

Records before the 2025 World Athletics Indoor Championships
Record	Athlete (nation)	Time (s)	Location	Date
World record	Irina Privalova (RUS)	6.92	Madrid, Spain	11 February 1993
World record	Irina Privalova (RUS)	6.92	Madrid, Spain	9 February 1995
Championship record	Gail Devers (USA)	6.95	Toronto, Canada	12 March 1993
World leading	Zaynab Dosso (ITA)	7.01	Apeldoorn, Netherlands	9 March 2025

== Qualification ==
For the women's 60 metres, the qualification period ran from 1 September 2024 to 9 March 2025. The entry standards were 7.15 s indoors or 10.90 s over 100 metres outdoors. Athletes could also qualify by virtue of their World Athletics Ranking for the event or by virtue of their World Athletics Indoor Tour wildcard. There was a target number of 56 athletes.

== Results ==
=== Heats ===
The heats were held on 22 March, starting at 11:15 (UTC+8) in the morning. First 3 of each heat (Q) plus 6 fastest times (q) qualified for the semi-finals.

==== Heat 1 ====
Place	Lane	Athlete	Nation	Time	Notes
1	3	Zaynab Dosso	Italy	7.09	Q
2	2	Kishawna Niles	Barbados	7.22	Q
3	7	Audrey Leduc	Canada	7.25	Q
4	4	Polyniki Emmanouilidou	Greece	7.28	q
5	5	Maria Mihalache	Romania	7.34	
6	8	Viktória Forster	Slovakia	7.39	
—	6	Beatrice Masilingi	Namibia	DNS	

==== Heat 2 ====
Place	Lane	Athlete	Nation	Time	Notes
1	8	Jodean Williams	Jamaica	7.20	Q
2	2	Patrizia van der Weken	Luxembourg	7.21 [.203]	Q
3	6	Destiny Smith-Barnett	Liberia	7.21 [.210]	Q
4	5	Camille Rutherford	Bahamas	7.25	q
5	4	Chen Yujie	China	7.34	
6	7	Guadalupe Torrez	Bolivia	7.58	
7	3	Valentina Meredova	Turkmenistan	7.68	SB

==== Heat 3 ====
Place	Lane	Athlete	Nation	Time	Notes
1	2	Zoe Hobbs	New Zealand	7.18	Q
2	7	Mikiah Brisco	United States	7.20	Q
3	3	Boglárka Takács	Hungary	7.24	Q
4	6	Ana Carolina Azevedo	Brazil	7.31	
5	8	Gloria Hooper	Italy	7.36	
6	5	Maja Mihalinec Zidar	Slovenia	7.40	
7	4	Natasha Chetty	Seychelles	7.80	

==== Heat 4 ====
Place	Lane	Athlete	Nation	Time	Notes
1	6	Mujinga Kambundji	Switzerland	7.20	Q
2	2	Rani Rosius	Belgium	7.23	Q
3	8	Torrie Lewis	Australia	7.25	Q
4	4	Beyoncé Defreitas	British Virgin Islands	7.26	q, PB
5	3	Sade McCreath	Canada	7.27	q
6	5	Maboundou Koné	Ivory Coast	7.33	
7	7	Lucija Potnik	Slovenia	7.43	

==== Heat 5 ====
Place	Lane	Athlete	Nation	Time	Notes
1	7	Ewa Swoboda	Poland	7.16	Q
2	8	Liang Xiaojing	China	7.17	Q, PB
3	5	Natasha Morrison	Jamaica	7.20	Q
4	3	Géraldine Frey	Switzerland	7.26	q
5	2	Michelle-Lee Ahye	Trinidad and Tobago	7.28	q
6	6	Dimitra Tsoukala	Greece	7.46	
7	4	Natacha Ngoye	Republic of the Congo	7.59	

==== Heat 6 ====
Place	Lane	Athlete	Nation	Time	Notes
1	6	Joella Lloyd	Antigua and Barbuda	7.21	Q
2	7	Amy Hunt	Great Britain	7.26	Q
3	2	Julia Henriksson	Sweden	7.31	Q
4	8	Ella Connolly	Australia	7.35	
5	4	Ann Marii Kivikas	Estonia	7.40	
6	3	Kristina Marie Knott	Philippines	7.42	
7	5	Leah Sandavene	Angola	7.70	SB

=== Semi-finals ===
The semi-finals started on 22 March, starting at 20:15 (UTC+8). First 2 in each heat (Q) and the next 2 fastest (q) qualified for the final.

==== Heat 1 ====
Place	Lane	Athlete	Nation	Time	Notes
1	3	Zaynab Dosso	Italy	7.07	Q
2	4	Amy Hunt	Great Britain	7.15	Q
3	6	Liang Xiaojing	China	7.17	q, PB
4	5	Joella Lloyd	Antigua and Barbuda	7.25 [.243]	
5	7	Natasha Morrison	Jamaica	7.25 [.247]	
6	1	Michelle-Lee Ahye	Trinidad and Tobago	7.31	
7	2	Julia Henriksson	Sweden	7.35	
8	8	Camille Rutherford	Bahamas	7.41	

==== Heat 2 ====
Place	Lane	Athlete	Nation	Time	Notes
1	5	Patrizia van der Weken	Luxembourg	7.12 [.112]	Q
2	3	Mujinga Kambundji	Switzerland	7.12 [.119]	Q
3	4	Zoe Hobbs	New Zealand	7.12 [.120]	q, SB
4	2	Torrie Lewis	Australia	7.23	
5	7	Boglárka Takács	Hungary	7.25	
6	6	Kishawna Niles	Barbados	7.32	
7	1	Polyniki Emmanouilidou	Greece	7.33	
8	8	Sade McCreath	Canada	7.35	

==== Heat 3 ====
Place	Lane	Athlete	Nation	Time	Notes
1	3	Ewa Swoboda	Poland	7.11	Q
2	6	Rani Rosius	Belgium	7.15	Q
3	4	Mikiah Brisco	United States	7.19	
4	5	Jodean Williams	Jamaica	7.22 [.214]	
5	2	Audrey Leduc	Canada	7.22 [.214]	
6	8	Géraldine Frey	Switzerland	7.24	
7	7	Destiny Smith-Barnett	Liberia	7.29	
8	1	Beyoncé Defreitas	British Virgin Islands	7.38	

=== Final ===
The final was held on 22 March, starting at 21:18 (UTC+8) in the evening.

Place	Lane	Athlete	Nation	Time	Notes
1st place, gold medalist(s)	6	Mujinga Kambundji	Switzerland	7.04	
2nd place, silver medalist(s)	3	Zaynab Dosso	Italy	7.06	
3rd place, bronze medalist(s)	4	Patrizia van der Weken	Luxembourg	7.07	
4	5	Ewa Swoboda	Poland	7.09	
5	7	Amy Hunt	United Kingdom	7.11	
6	1	Zoe Hobbs	New Zealand	7.13	
7	2	Rani Rosius	Belgium	7.14 [.133]	
8	8	Liang Xiaojing	China	7.14 [.138]	PB
