= 2026 European Athletics Championships – Women's 100 metres =

Women's 100 metres at the 2026 European Athletics Championships
- Venue: Alexander Stadium
- Location: Birmingham, United Kingdom
- Dates: 10 August 2026
- Competitors: 36 (target)
- Winning time: 11.00

Medalists
gold medal	Amy Hunt	Great Britain
silver medal	Ewa Swoboda	Poland
bronze medal	Delphine Nkansa	Belgium

Official Video Highlights

The women's 100 metres at the 2026 European Athletics Championships took place over three rounds at the Alexander Stadium in Birmingham, United Kingdom, on 10 August 2026.

== Background ==
Records before the 2026 European Athletics Championships
Record	Athlete (nation)	Time	Location	Date
World record	Florence Griffith-Joyner (USA)	10.49	Indianapolis, United States	16 July 1988
European record	Christine Arron (FRA)	10.73	Budapest, Hungary	19 August 1998
Championship record	Christine Arron (FRA)	10.73	Budapest, Hungary	19 August 1998
World leading	Adeajah Hodge (IVB)	10.63	Eugene, United States	11 June 2026
European leading	Géraldine Di Tizio-Frey (SUI)	10.96	Zürich, Switzerland	25 July 2026

== Qualification ==
For the women's 100 metres, the qualification period was from 27 July 2025 to 26 July 2026. Athletes qualified by running the entry standard of 11.18 or faster, by wildcard for the 2024 European Athletics Champion, or by their position on the World Athletics Rankings for the event. The target number was 36 athletes.

Qualification standings per 31 July 2026
QP	CP	Country	Athlete	PB	SB	Qualification method	Qualification details
1	1	Great Britain & N.I.	Dina Asher-Smith	10.83	11.13	Qualified by Wild Card	Defending European Champion
2	2	Great Britain & N.I.	Daryll Neita	10.90	11.18	Qualified by Entry Standard	10.94 - National Stadium, Tokyo (JPN) - 13 SEP 2025
3	1	Switzerland	Géraldine Di Tizio-Frey	10.96	10.96	Qualified by Entry Standard	10.96 - Letzigrund, Zürich (SUI) - 25 JUL 2026
4	3	Great Britain & N.I.	Amy Hunt	10.97	10.97	Qualified by Entry Standard	10.97 - Olympiastadion, Stockholm (SWE) - 07 JUN 2026
5	1	Poland	Ewa Swoboda	10.94	10.98	Qualified by Entry Standard	10.98 - Sports Park Mladost, Zagreb (CRO) - 26 JUN 2026
6	1	Czech Republic	Karolína Maňasová	11.01	11.01	Qualified by Entry Standard	11.01 - Sportzentrum Niederösterreich, St. Pölten (AUT) - 04 JUN 2026
7	1	Portugal	Tatjana Pinto	11.00	11.02	Qualified by Entry Standard	11.02 - Estadio Universitario, Lisboa (POR) - 25 JUL 2026
8	1	Germany	Rebekka Haase	11.04	11.04	Qualified by Entry Standard	11.04 - Sportzentrum Niederösterreich, St. Pölten (AUT) - 04 JUN 2026
9	2	Germany	Gina Lückenkemper	10.93	11.21	Qualified by Entry Standard	11.05 - Olympiastadion, Berlin (GER) - 27 JUL 2025
10	1	Luxembourg	Patrizia Van der Weken	11.00	11.05	Qualified by Entry Standard	11.05 - Olympiastadion, Stockholm (SWE) - 07 JUN 2026
11	1	Austria	Christania Williams	10.96	11.06	Qualified by Entry Standard	11.06 - Štadión SNP, Banská Bystrica (SVK) - 21 JUL 2026
12	1	Italy	Zaynab Dosso	11.01	11.07	Qualified by Entry Standard	11.07 - Centro Sportivo Fontanassa, Savona (ITA) - 20 MAY 2026
13	1	Hungary	Boglárka Takács	11.06	11.16	Qualified by Entry Standard	11.08 - Nemzeti Atlétikai Központ, Budapest (HUN) - 02 AUG 2025
14	2	Switzerland	Salomé Kora	10.95	11.09	Qualified by Entry Standard	11.09 - Letzigrund, Zürich (SUI) - 25 JUL 2026
15	2	Austria	Isabel Posch	11.10	11.10	Qualified by Entry Standard	11.10 - Sportzentrum Niederösterreich, St. Pölten (AUT) - 04 JUN 2026
16	3	Switzerland	Ajla Del Ponte	10.90	11.11	Qualified by Entry Standard	11.11 - Stadion Trinermatten, Zofingen (SUI) - 23 MAY 2026
17	4	Great Britain & N.I.	Imani Lansiquot	10.99	11.02	Qualified by Entry Standard	11.12 - Centro Sportivo Fontanassa, Savona (ITA) - 20 MAY 2026
reserve	4	Switzerland	Nathacha Kouni	11.12	11.12	Qualified by Entry Standard	11.12 - Letzigrund, Zürich (SUI) - 25 JUL 2026
18	1	Belgium	Delphine Nkansa	11.13	11.13	Qualified by Entry Standard	11.13 - Atletiekarena Gaston Roelants, Kessel-Lo (BEL) - 25 JUL 2026
19	1	Spain	María Isabel Pérez	11.07	11.15	Qualified by Entry Standard	11.15 - Sports Park Mladost, Zagreb (CRO) - 26 JUN 2026
20	2	Poland	Krystsina Tsimanouskaya	11.04	11.16	Qualified by Entry Standard	11.16 - Stadion Zygmunta Szelesta, Warszawa (POL) - 27 JUN 2026
21	3	Germany	Chelsea Kadiri	11.17	11.17	Qualified by Entry Standard	11.17 - Enwag-Stadion, Wetzlar (GER) - 10 JUL 2026
reserve	5	Great Britain & N.I.	Mabel Akande	11.18	11.18	Qualified by Entry Standard	11.18 - Alexander Stadium, Birmingham (GBR) - 20 JUN 2026
22	2	Belgium	Rani Rosius	11.10	11.18	Qualified by Entry Standard	11.18 - Province Naimette Arena, Liège (BEL) - 15 JUL 2026
23	1	Malta	Claire Azzopardi	11.66	11.68	Qualified by Universality Place	
24	1	San Marino	Alessandra Gasparelli	11.42	11.42	Qualified by Universality Place	
25	1	Gibraltar	Charlotte Peat	12.93	12.93	Qualified by Universality Place	
26	3	Austria	Magdalena Lindner	11.26	11.26	Qualified by World Rankings	19th - 1193 points
27	1	Greece	Polyniki Emmanouilidou	11.21	11.28	Qualified by World Rankings	25th - 1182 points
28	2	Portugal	Arialis Gandulla	11.17	11.25	Qualified by World Rankings	28th - 1177 points
29	2	Greece	Rafailia Spanoudaki-Chatziriga	11.26	11.37	Qualified by World Rankings	33rd - 1176 points
30	1	Finland	Lotta Kemppinen	11.19	11.28	Qualified by World Rankings	34th - 1175 points
31	1	Slovenia	Zala Istenič	11.25	11.25	Qualified by World Rankings	35th - 1173 points
32	1	Slovakia	Viktória Forster	11.19	11.34	Qualified by World Rankings	37th - 1169 points
reserve	4	Germany	Philina Marianne Schwartz	11.23	11.23	Qualified by World Rankings	43rd - 1166 points
33	1	Ireland	Ciara Neville	11.31	11.31	Qualified by World Rankings	46th - 1165 points
34	2	Italy	Gloria Hooper	11.24	11.25	Qualified by World Rankings	47th - 1163 points
35	1	Estonia	Ann Marii Kivikas	11.35	11.38	Qualified by World Rankings	48th - 1162 points
36	2	Ireland	Lauren Roy	11.23	11.23	Qualified by World Rankings	51st - 1161 points
reserve	1	Turkey	Simay Özçiftçi	11.36	11.36	Next best by World Rankings	53rd - 1160 points
reserve	1	Lithuania	Ema Rupšytė	11.37	11.46	Next best by World Rankings	60th - 1152 points
reserve	1	Norway	Helene Rønningen	11.38	11.44	Next best by World Rankings	61st - 1151 points
reserve	3	Portugal	Beatriz Castelhano	11.34	11.34	Next best by World Rankings	69th - 1144 points
reserve	2	Spain	Ericka Badeau Maseras	11.32	11.32	Next best by World Rankings	70th - 1142 points
reserve	3	Italy	Alessia Pavese	11.19	11.19	Next best by World Rankings	75th - 1135 points
reserve	3	Ireland	Lucy-May Sleeman	11.26	11.26	Next best by World Rankings	77th - 1135 points
reserve	2	Slovakia	Delia Farajpour	11.42	11.45	Next best by World Rankings	79th - 1133 points
reserve	4	Italy	Alice Pagliarini	11.44	11.44	Next best by World Rankings	92nd - 1127 points
reserve	1	Sweden	Wilma Svenson	11.32	11.32	Next best by World Rankings	109th - 1116 points
reserve	1	Bulgaria	Radina Velichkova	11.45	11.53	Next best by World Rankings	132nd - 1106 points
reserve	4	Ireland	Mollie O'Reilly	11.54	11.54	Next best by World Rankings	143rd - 1102 points

Bye to semi-finals	Reserve activated	Withdrawal / reserve unused

== Schedule ==
Date	Time	Round
10 August 2026	11:25	Round 1
10 August 2026	20:10	Semi-finals
10 August 2026	21:50	Final

All times are local times (UTC+1)

== Results ==
=== Round 1 ===
Round 1 was held on 10 August 2026, at 11:25 in the morning. 12 best performers (q) advance to the semi-finals.

==== Heat 1 ====
Place	Lane	Athlete	Nation	Time	Notes
1	6	Boglárka Takács	Hungary	10.93	q
2	7	Imani-Lara Lansiquot	Great Britain & N.I.	10.99	q
3	3	María Isabel Pérez	Spain	11.11	q
4	9	Arialis Gandulla	Portugal	11.18	q
5	8	Ciara Neville	Ireland	11.29	q
6	2	Viktória Forster	Slovakia	11.51	
7	4	Charlotte Peat	Gibraltar	12.71	
—	5	Zala Istenič	Slovenia	DQ	TR16.8
				Wind: (+3.2 m/s)	

==== Heat 2 ====
Place	Lane	Athlete	Nation	Time	Notes
1	6	Rani Rosius	Belgium	11.17	q, SB
2	7	Lotta Kemppinen	Finland	11.25	q, SB
3	2	Nathacha Kouni	Switzerland	11.31 [.301]	q
4	5	Polyniki Emmanouilidou	Greece	11.31 [.304]	
5	8	Ann Marii Kivikas	Estonia	11.35	=NR
6	4	Chelsea Kadiri	Germany	11.47	
7	3	Isabel Posch	Austria	11.48	
8	9	Alessandra Gasparelli	San Marino	11.60	
				Wind: (+0.0 m/s)	

==== Heat 3 ====
Place	Lane	Athlete	Nation	Time	Notes
1	7	Delphine Nkansa	Belgium	11.07	q, PB
2	2	Salomé Kora	Switzerland	11.19	q
3	9	Gloria Hooper	Italy	11.24	q, =PB
4	8	Krystsina Tsimanouskaya	Poland	11.30	q
5	4	Magdalena Lindner	Austria	11.32 [.317]	
6	5	Lauren Roy	Ireland	11.32 [.318]	
7	6	Rafaéla Spanoudaki-Hatziriga	Greece	11.42	
8	3	Claire Azzopardi	Malta	11.88	
				Wind: (+1.8 m/s)	

=== Semi-finals ===
The semi-finals were held on 10 August 2026, at 20:10 in the evening. First 2 in each heat (Q) and the next 2 by time (q) qualified for the final.

==== Heat 1 ====
Place	Lane	Athlete	Nation	Time	Notes
1	7	Amy Hunt	Great Britain & N.I.	10.99	Q
2	6	Patrizia Van der Weken	Luxembourg	11.08	Q
3	3	Dina Asher-Smith	Great Britain & N.I.	11.10	q, SB
4	5	Salomé Kora	Switzerland	11.12	q
5	2	Gina Lückenkemper	Germany	11.28 [.274]	
6	4	Tatjana Pinto	Portugal	11.28 [.278]	
7	9	Lotta Kemppinen	Finland	11.29	
8	8	Krystsina Tsimanouskaya	Poland	11.44	
				Wind: (+1.0 m/s)	

==== Heat 2 ====
Place	Lane	Athlete	Nation	Time	Notes
1	7	Géraldine Di Tizio-Frey	Switzerland	11.02	Q
2	5	Zaynab Dosso	Italy	11.11	Q
3	4	Imani Lansiquot	Great Britain & N.I.	11.16	
4	3	Rani Rosius	Belgium	11.24	
5	8	María Isabel Pérez	Spain	11.31	
6	2	Daryll Neita	Great Britain & N.I.	11.34	
7	6	Rebekka Haase	Germany	11.36	
8	9	Ciara Neville	Ireland	11.57	
				Wind: (+1.1 m/s)	

==== Heat 3 ====
Place	Lane	Athlete	Nation	Time	Notes
1	5	Ewa Swoboda	Poland	11.04	Q
2	6	Delphine Nkansa	Belgium	11.09	Q
3	8	Boglárka Takács	Hungary	11.13	SB
4	4	Christania Williams	Austria	11.21	
5	7	Karolína Maňasová	Czech Republic	11.23	
6	3	Nathacha Kouni	Switzerland	11.26	
7	2	Arialis Gandulla	Portugal	11.34	
8	9	Gloria Hooper	Italy	11.37	
				Wind: (+0.9 m/s)	

=== Final ===
The final was held on 10 August 2026, at 21:50 in the evening.

Place	Lane	Athlete	Nation	Time	Notes
1st place, gold medalist(s)	4	Amy Hunt	Great Britain & N.I.	11.00	
2nd place, silver medalist(s)	6	Ewa Swoboda	Poland	11.02	
3rd place, bronze medalist(s)	8	Delphine Nkansa	Belgium	11.06	PB
4	7	Géraldine Di Tizio-Frey	Switzerland	11.07	
5	2	Dina Asher-Smith	Great Britain & N.I.	11.10	=SB
6	5	Patrizia Van der Weken	Luxembourg	11.10	
7	3	Zaynab Dosso	Italy	11.12	
8	9	Salomé Kora	Switzerland	11.51	
				Wind: (+1.0 m/s)	
