= Boglárka Takács =

Hungarian athlete

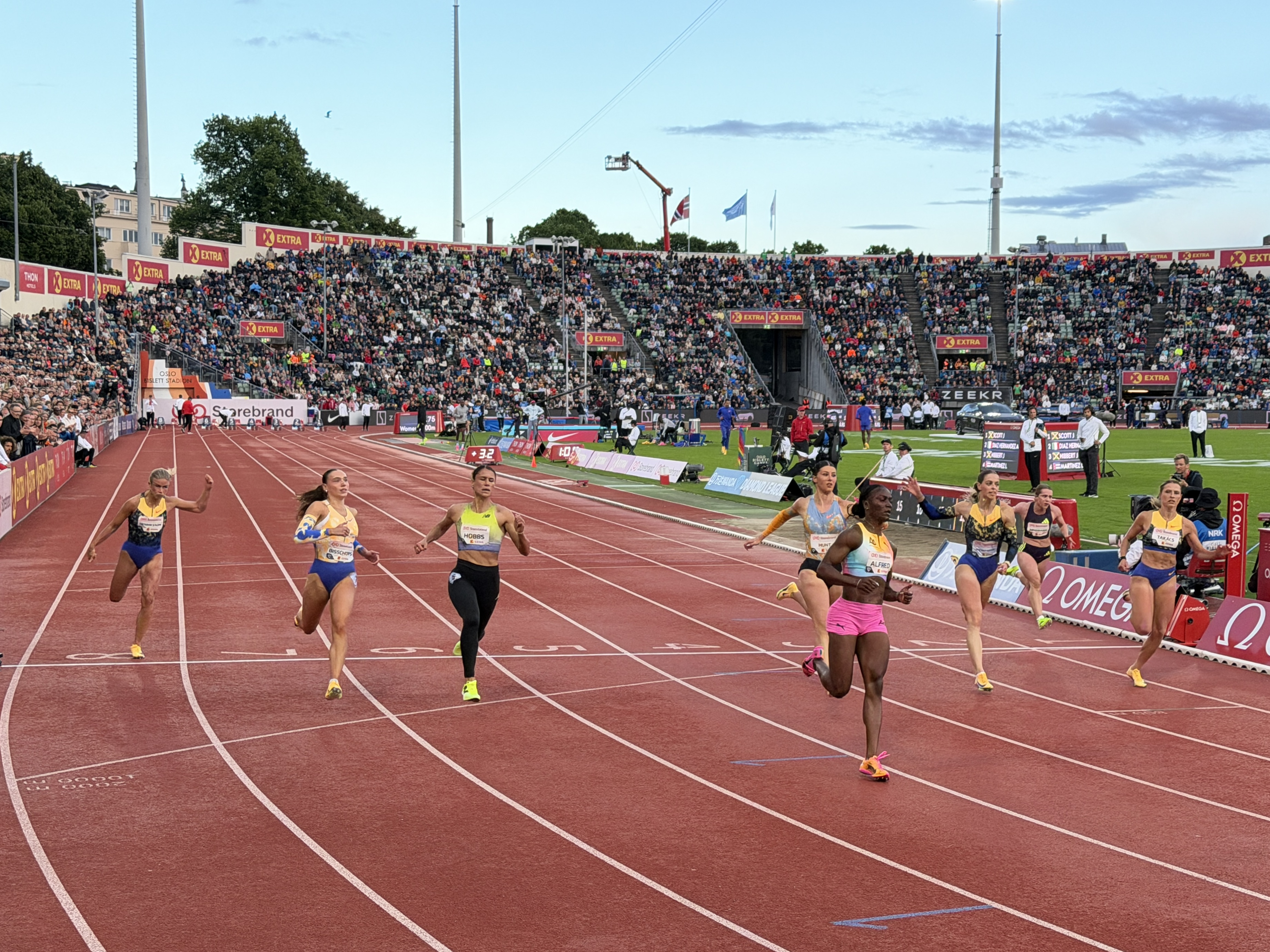
- Takács at the 2026 Bislett Games

Personal information
- Nationality: Hungarian
- Born: 28 August 2001 (age 25)

Sport
- Sport: Athletics
- Event: Sprint

Achievements and titles
- Personal bests: 60 m: 7.09 (2025, NR); 100 m: 11.06 (2025, NR); 200 m: 22.65 (2025, NR)
Medal record
Women's athletics
Representing Hungary
European U23 Championships
Silver medal – second place	2023 Espoo	100 m
Silver medal – second place	2023 Espoo	200 m

Boglárka Takács (born 28 August 2001) is a Hungarian track and field athlete who competes internationally as a sprinter. She is a multiple-time Hungarian national champion as well as the Hungarian record-holder over 100m and 200m. In 2025, she set a Hungarian national record over 60 metres.

== Biography ==
Boglárka Takács runs for Budapest Honved. In 2022, Boglárka Takács twice lowered the Hungarian record over 100 metres. In May, 2022 she beat Enikő Szabó's time of 11.41 seconds from 2004, running 11.37 seconds, and then in September 2022 she lowered it again to 11.31 seconds. In August 2022, she competed in the women's 100 meters at the 2022 European Athletics Championships held in Munich, Germany, qualifying for the semi-finals.

In June 2023, she beat the Hungarian national record for the 200 metres set by Irén Orosz-Árva in 1981, running 22.77 seconds in Budapest. On the same day, she lowered the 100 metre national record to 11.23 seconds. Later that month, Takács won the bronze medal in the 100 metres at the 2023 European Athletics Team Championships Second Division, in Silesia, Poland, helping her country to win the Second Division title.

She was selected as part of the Hungary team for the 2023 European Athletics U23 Championships held from in July 2023 in Espoo, Finland. In the 100m semi-finals she was quickest qualifier and set a new national record time of 11.14 seconds, which also improved the European U23 leading time of the year. She won the silver medal in the final. She then also won the silver medal in the 200 metres.

Selected for the 2023 World Athletics Championships in Budapest, she qualified for the semi-final of the 100 metres. She also competed in the 200 metres but did not make it through the heats.

She reached the semi-finals of the women's 60 metres at the 2024 World Athletics Indoor Championships in Glasgow. She ran as part of the Hungarian 4 × 100 m relay team at the 2024 World Relays Championships in Nassau, Bahamas. She finished sixth in the 100 metres at the 2024 Diamond League event in Stockholm. She competed at the 2024 Summer Olympics in Paris over 200 metres.

Competing at the 2025 European Athletics Indoor Championships, she set a Hungarian national record of 7.09 seconds in winning her semi-final. She was selected for the 2025 World Athletics Indoor Championships in Nanjing.

She ran 11.06 seconds for the 100 metres at the 2025 European Athletics Team Championships in Madrid, winning the First Division race and lowering her own national record. She ran 11.08 seconds for the 100 metres to win the 2025 Hungarian Championships in Budapest. She was selected for the 100 metres and 200 metres by the Hungarian team for the 2025 World Athletics Championships in Tokyo, Japan In September 2025, she was a semi-finalist in the 100 metres.

Takács won the 60 metres title at the 2026 Hungarian Indoor Championships in Nyíregyháza. In May, she ran at the 2026 World Athletics Relays in the women's 4 × 100 metres relay in Gaborone, Botswana. In June, she placed fifth over 100 metres at the 2026 Bislett Games. In August 2026, she competed at the 2026 European Athletics Championships in Birmingham, England, in the women's 200 metres, reaching the final and placing eighth overall. She also competed in the women's 100 metres at the championships, reaching the semi-finals and in the women's 4 × 100 metres relay at the championships, where Hungary placed sixth overall in the final. At the 2026 Diamond League Final in Brussels in September, she placed eighth in the 100 metres. She also competed that month over 100 m at the inaugural World Ultimate Championship in Budapest.

== Athletic Achievements ==
=== Personal bests ===
Type	Distance	Time (s)	Wind (m/s)	Venue	Date	Notes
Individual events
Indoor	50 metres	6.27	—N/a	Ostrava, Czech Republic	4 February 2025	NR
Indoor	60 metres	7.09	—N/a	Apeldoorn, Netherlands	9 March 2025	NR
Indoor	200 metres sh	23.56	—N/a	Nyíregyháza, Hungary	18 February 2024	
Outdoor	100 metres	11.06	0.0	Madrid, Spain	27 June 2025	NR
Outdoor	200 metres	22.65	-0.3	Madrid, Spain	29 June 2025	NR
Team events
Outdoor	4 × 100 metres relay	42.84	—N/a	Birmingham, United Kingdom	15 August 2026	NR

=== International competitions ===
Representing Hungary
Year	Competition	Venue	Position	Event	Time	Notes
2017	European Youth Olympic Festival	Győr, Hungary	2nd	100 m	11.58	
2017	European Youth Olympic Festival	Győr, Hungary	—	4 × 100 m relay	DNF	
2018	European U18 Championships	Győr, Hungary	2nd	100 m	11.75	
2018	World U20 Championships	Tampere, Finland	30th (h)	100 m	11.88	
2018	Youth Olympic Games	Buenos Aires, Argentina	4th	100 m	11.45	
2019	European U20 Championships	Borås, Sweden	8th	100 m	11.73	
2019	European U20 Championships	Borås, Sweden	14th (h)	4 × 100 m relay	46.28	
2021	European Team Championships Second League	Stara Zagora, Bulgaria	1st	4 × 100 m relay	44.38	
2021	European U23 Championships	Tallinn, Estonia	18th (sf)	100 m	11.65	
2021	European U23 Championships	Tallinn, Estonia	20th (sf)	200 m	24.13	
2022	European Championships	Munich, Germany	16th (sf)	100 m	11.49	
2022	European Championships	Munich, Germany	11th (h)	4 × 100 m relay	44.19	SB
2023	European Indoor Championships	Istanbul, Türkiye	28th (h)	60 m	7.42	
2023	European Team Championships Second Division	Chorzów, Poland	3rd	100 m	11.36	
2023	European Team Championships Second Division	Chorzów, Poland	1st	4 × 100 m relay	43.49	NR
2023	European U23 Championships	Espoo, Finland	2nd	100 m	11.30	
2023	European U23 Championships	Espoo, Finland	2nd	200 m	23.33	
2023	World Championships	Budapest, Hungary	23rd (sf)	100 m	11.26	
2023	World Championships	Budapest, Hungary	29th (h)	200 m	23.24	
2023	World Championships	Budapest, Hungary	14th (h)	4 × 100 m relay	43.38	NR
2024	World Indoor Championships	Glasgow, United Kingdom	17th (sf)	60 m	7.21	
2024	World Relays	Nassau, Bahamas	19th (h)	4 × 100 m relay	43.66	Re
2024	World Relays	Nassau, Bahamas	15th	4 × 100 m relay	44.04	
2024	European Championships	Rome, Italy	9th (sf)	100 m	11.16	
2024	European Championships	Rome, Italy	13th (sf)	200 m	23.09	
2024	Olympic Games	Paris, France	18th (sf)	100 m	11.26	
2024	Olympic Games	Paris, France	32nd (h)	200 m	23.05	
2025	European Indoor Championships	Apeldoorn, Netherlands	7th	60 m	7.12	
2025	World Indoor Championships	Nanjing, China	14th (sf)	60 m	7.25	
2025	European Team Championships First Division	Madrid, Spain	1st	100 m	11.06	CR NR
2025	European Team Championships First Division	Madrid, Spain	6th	200 m	22.65	NR
2025	European Team Championships First Division	Madrid, Spain	10th	4 × 100 m relay	43.33	NR
2025	World Championships	Tokyo, Japan	21st (sf)	100 m	11.32	
2025	World Championships	Tokyo, Japan	33rd (h)	200 m	23.18	
2026	World Relays	Gaborone, Botswana	—	4 × 100 m relay	DQ (Re)	TR 24.6
2026	World Relays	Gaborone, Botswana	3rd	4 × 100 m relay	43.32	NR
2026	European Championships	Birmingham, United Kingdom	9th (sf)	100 m	11.13	SB
2026	European Championships	Birmingham, United Kingdom	8th	200 m	22.82	
2026	European Championships	Birmingham, United Kingdom	6th	4 × 100 m relay	43.33	
2026	World Ultimate Championship	Budapest, Hungary	15th (h)	100 m	11.27	
2026	World Ultimate Championship	Budapest, Hungary	16th (h)	200 m	23.24	

=== National championships and competitions ===
Year	Competition	Venue	Position	Event	Time	Notes
2016	Hungarian Championships, U16 events	Debrecen	1st	100 m	13.03	
2017	Hungarian U18 Indoor Championships	Budapest	2nd	60 m	7.75	
2017	Hungarian U18 Indoor Championships	Budapest	2nd	200 m	25.91	
2017	Hungarian U18 Indoor Championships	Budapest	1st	4 × 200 m relay	1:44.14	
2017	Hungarian U18 Championships	Miskolc	1st	100 m	12.24	
2017	Hungarian U18 Championships	Miskolc	2nd	200 m	25.49	
2018	Hungarian Indoor Championships	Budapest	4th	100 m	7.65	
2018	Hungarian U18 Indoor Championships	Budapest	1st	60 m	7.55	
2018	Hungarian U18 Indoor Championships	Budapest	1st	200 m	24.78	
2018	Hungarian U18 Indoor Championships	Budapest	1st	4 × 200 m relay	1:43.68	
2018	Hungarian U18 Championships	Győr	1st	100 m	11.78	
2018	Hungarian U18 Championships	Győr	1st	200 m	24.31	
2018	Hungarian Championships	Székesfehérvár	2nd	100 m	11.81	
2018	Hungarian Championships	Székesfehérvár	2nd	4 × 100 m relay	47.06	
2019	Hungarian Indoor Championships	Budapest	2nd	60 m	7.43	
2019	Hungarian Indoor Championships	Budapest	1st	200 m	24.08	
2019	Hungarian U20 Indoor Championships	Budapest	1st	60 m	7.47	
2019	Hungarian U20 Indoor Championships	Budapest	1st	200 m	24.29	
2019	Hungarian U20 Indoor Championships	Budapest	1st	4 × 200 m relay	1:39.93	
2019	Hungarian U20 Championships	Budapest	1st	100 m	12.07	
2019	Hungarian U20 Championships	Budapest	1st	200 m	24.09	
2019	Hungarian Championships	Budapest	1st	100 m	11.56	
2019	Hungarian Championships	Budapest	1st	200 m	23.73	
2020	Hungarian Indoor Championships	Budapest	2nd	60 m	7.51	
2020	Hungarian Indoor Championships	Budapest	1st	200 m	24.60	
2020	Hungarian U20 Indoor Championships	Budapest	1st	60 m	7.56	
2020	Hungarian U20 Indoor Championships	Budapest	1st	200 m	24.65	
2020	Hungarian Championships	Budapest	3rd	100 m	12.02	
2020	Hungarian Championships	Budapest	3rd	4 × 400 m relay	3:48.29	
2020	Hungarian U20 Championships	Budapest	1st	100 m	12.10	
2020	Hungarian U20 Championships	Budapest	1st	200 m	25.06	
2021	Hungarian U23 Championships	Miskolc	1st	100 m	11.81	
2021	Hungarian U23 Championships	Miskolc	1st	200 m	24.10	
2021	Hungarian Championships	Debrecen	2nd	100 m	11.66	
2021	Hungarian Championships	Debrecen	1st	200 m	23.66	
2022	Hungarian Indoor Championships	Nyíregyháza	2nd	60 m	7.47	
2022	Hungarian Championships	Budapest	1st	100 m	11.58	
2022	Hungarian Championships	Budapest	1st	200 m	23.60	
2022	Hungarian U23 Championships	Miskolc	1st	100 m	11.44	
2022	Hungarian U23 Championships	Miskolc	1st	200 m	23.89	
2023	Hungarian Indoor Championships	Nyíregyháza	3rd	60 m	7.40	
2023	Hungarian Championships	Budapest	1st	100 m	11.36	
2023	Hungarian Championships	Budapest	1st	200 m	23.27	
2024	Hungarian Indoor Championships	Nyíregyháza	1st	60 m	7.20	
2024	Hungarian Indoor Championships	Nyíregyháza	1st	200 m	23.56	
2024	Hungarian Championships	Budapest	1st	100 m	11.19	
2024	Hungarian Championships	Budapest	1st	200 m	23.21	
2025	Hungarian Indoor Championships	Nyíregyháza	1st	60 m	7.21	
2025	Hungarian Championships	Budapest	1st	100 m	11.08	
2025	Hungarian Championships	Budapest	1st	200 m	23.06	
2026	Hungarian Indoor Championships	Nyíregyháza	1st	60 m	7.28	
2026	Hungarian Championships	Budapest	1st	100 m	11.27	
2026	Hungarian Championships	Budapest	1st	200 m	23.02	

== Personal life ==
Her younger brother, Ábel Takács, is also a sprinter, and won the 2025 Hungarian Championships over 200 metres with a personal best time of 21.04 seconds.
