= Arialis Gandulla =

Cuban-born Portuguese sprinter (born 1995)

Personal information
- Full name: Arialis Josefa Gandulla Martínez
- Born: 22 June 1995 (age 31)
- Height: 1.70 m (5 ft 7 in)
- Weight: 75 kg (165 lb)

Sport
- Country: Portugal
- Sport: Athletics
- Events: 100 m, 200 m
- Club: Benfica
Medal record
Women's athletics
Representing Portugal
Mediterranean Games
Gold medal – first place	2026 Taranto	4×100 m relay
Bronze medal – third place	2026 Taranto	100 m

Arialis Josefa Gandulla Martínez (born 22 June 1995) is a Cuban-born Portuguese sprinter. She competed in the 200 metres at the 2015 World Championships in Beijing without advancing from the first round. At club level, she represents Benfica in Portugal.

== International competitions ==
Year	Competition	Venue	Position	Event	Notes
Representing Cuba
2013	Pan American Junior Championships	Medellin, Colombia	1st	100 m	11.32 (w)
2013	Pan American Junior Championships	Medellin, Colombia	1st	200 m	23.27
2014	World Junior Championships	Eugene, United States	6th	200 m	23.48 (w)
2014	Pan American Sports Festival	Mexico City, Mexico	4th	200 m	23.15 (w)
2014	Central American and Caribbean Games	Xalapa, Mexico	5th	100 m	11.55
2014	Central American and Caribbean Games	Xalapa, Mexico	4th	200 m	23.57
2014	Central American and Caribbean Games	Xalapa, Mexico	3rd	4 × 100 m relay	44.19
2015	Pan American Games	Toronto, Canada	15th (sf)	100 m	11.36 (w)
2015	Pan American Games	Toronto, Canada	13th (sf)	200 m	23.08
2015	Pan American Games	Toronto, Canada	8th (h)	4 × 100 m relay	44.58^{1}
2015	NACAC Championships	San José, Costa Rica	9th (h)	200 m	23.82
2015	World Championships	Beijing, China	40th (h)	200 m	23.35
2016	NACAC U23 Championships	San Salvador, El Salvador	2nd	200 m	23.36
2016	Olympic Games	Rio de Janeiro, Brazil	50th (h)	200 m	23.41
Representing Portugal
2023	European Indoor Championships	Istanbul, Turkey	5th	60 m	7.17
2023	World Championships	Budapest, Hungary	40th (h)	100 m	11.47
2024	European Championships	Rome, Italy	21st (h)	100 m	11.65
2026	European Championships	Birmingham, United Kingdom	20th (sf)	100 m	11.34
2026	European Championships	Birmingham, United Kingdom	7th (h)	4 × 100 m relay	43.06^{1}
2026	Mediterranean Games	Taranto, Italy	3rd	100 m	11.43
2026	Mediterranean Games	Taranto, Italy	1st	4 × 100 m relay	43.57

^{1}Did not finish in the final

== Personal bests ==
Outdoor

- 100 metres – 11.22 (Meeting de Salamanca, 2021)
- 200 metres – 23.08 (+1.6 m/s, Toronto 2015)

== Personal life ==
Gandulla is married to Pedro Pichardo, with whom she has a daughter, Rosalis Maria.
