= Karolína Maňasová =

Czech athlete (born 2003)

Personal information
- Nationality: Czech
- Born: 26 November 2003 (age 22) Nový Jičín, Czech Republic

Sport
- Sport: Athletics
- Event: Sprint
- Club: SSK Vítkovice

Achievements and titles
- Personal bests: 60m: 7.05 (Ostrava, 2026) NR; 100m: 11.01 (St. Pölten, 2026) NR
Medal record
Women's athletics
Representing Czech Republic
European U23 Championships
| Gold medal – first place | 2025 Bergen | 100m |

Karolína Maňasová (born 26 November 2003) is a Czech sprinter. She is the Czech national record holder in the 60 metres and 100 metres. She has competed at multiple major championships, including the 2024 Olympic Games in Paris, where she competed in the 100 metres.

== Biography ==
She is a member of SSK Vitkovice. She won her first national title at the Czech Indoor Athletics Championships in the 60 metres, in February 2023.

In January 2024, Manasova equalled the Czech 60m national record at the Jablonec Indoor Meeting, running 7.23 to equal the time set by Klára Seidlová in 2018. She set a new Czech 60m record of 7.15 in Ostrava in February 2024, and retained her national title at that distance. She competed at the 2024 World Athletics Indoor Championships in Glasgow in March 2024, where she ran 7.27 seconds in her qualifying heat without progressing through to the semi-finals.

Maňasová competed at the 2024 European Athletics Championships in Rome, Italy, where she reached the semi-finals. At the Championships she ran a 100 metres personal best of 11.17 seconds. In June 2024, she became Czech champion in the same distance, running 11.24 in the final, and managed to run 11.21 in her heat to set a new Czech Athletics Championships record time. She competed in the 100 metres at the 2024 Paris Olympics, reaching the semi-finals and running a personal best 11.11 seconds.

She retained her Czech national indoors 60m title in February 2025, running 7.17 seconds in Ostrava. She was a finalist in the 60 metres at the 2025 European Athletics Indoor Championships in Appeldoorn, Netherlands, qualifying for the semi-finals with a personal best and national indoor record time for the 60 metres of 7.14 seconds, before lowering it again to 7.10 seconds in the semi-final.

Maňasová won the gold medal in the 100 metres race at the 2025 European Athletics U23 Championships, running a time of 11.30 seconds into a headwind (-1.3 m/s). In September, she competed in the 100 metres at the 2025 World Championships in Tokyo, Japan.

On 20 January 2026 while competing in Ostrava, Maňasová ran a new Czech national record of 7.05 seconds for the 60 metres. On 28 February, Maňasová won the 60 metres at the Czech Indoor Athletics Championships in a championship record of 7.11 seconds.

On 4 June 2026, at the Liese Prokop Memorial in St. Pölten, Austria, Maňasová broke the Czech 100 m national record running the time of 11.01 seconds, breaking the previous mark which had been held by Jarmila Kratochvílová since 1981. In August 2026, she competed at the 2026 European Athletics Championships in Birmingham, England, in the women's 100 metres, reaching the semi-finals.

== Athletics achievements ==
Information from her World Athletics profile unless otherwise noted.

=== Personal bests ===
| Type | Distance | Time (s) | Wind (m/s) | Venue | Date | Notes |
Individual events
| Indoor | 60 metres | 7.05 | —N/a | Ostrava, Czech Republic | 20 January 2026 | NR |
| Indoor | 200 metres sh | 24.49 | —N/a | Ostrava, Czech Republic | 7 March 2021 | |
| Outdoor | 100 metres | 11.01 | +0.9 | St. Pölten, Austria | 4 June 2026 | NR |
| Outdoor | 200 metres | 23.98 | -1.4 | Ostrava, Czech Republic | 22 May 2022 | |
Team events
| Outdoor | 4 × 100 metres relay | 44.29 | —N/a | Chorzów, Poland | 24 June 2023 | |

=== International competitions ===
Representing Czech Republic
| Year | Competition | Venue | Position | Event | Time | Notes |
|---|---|---|---|---|---|---|
| 2023 | European Team Championships First Division | Chorzów, Poland | 10th | 100 m | 11.44 | |
| 2023 | European Team Championships First Division | Chorzów, Poland | 10th | 4 × 100 m relay | 44.29 | SB |
| 2023 | European U23 Championships | Espoo, Finland | 17th (sf) | 100 m | 11.53 | |
| 2024 | World Indoor Championships | Glasgow, United Kingdom | 27th (h) | 60 m | 7.27 | |
| 2024 | European Championships | Rome, Italy | 10th (sf) | 100 m | 11.17 | NU23R |
| 2024 | Olympic Games | Paris, France | 24th (sf) | 100 m | 11.35 | |
| 2025 | European Indoor Championships | Apeldoorn, The Netherlands | 8th | 60 m | 7.14 | |
| 2025 | European U23 Championships | Bergen, Norway | 1st | 100 m | 11.30 | |
| 2025 | World Championships | Tokyo, Japan | 44th (h) | 100 m | 11.37 | |
| 2026 | World Indoor Championships | Toruń, Poland | 11th (sf) | 60 m | 7.14 | |
| 2026 | European Championships | Birmingham, United Kingdom | 12th (sf) | 100 m | 11.23 | |
