= 2025 European Athletics U23 Championships – Women's 100 metres =

Women's 100 metres at the 2025 European Athletics U23 Championships
- Venue: Fana Stadion
- Location: Bergen, Norway
- Dates: 17 July (heats & semi-finals); 18 July (final)
- Competitors: 26 from 17 nations
- Winning time: 11.30

Medalists
gold medal	Karolína Maňasová	Czech Republic
silver medal	Nia Wedderburn-Goodison	Great Britain
bronze medal	Polyniki Emmanouilidou	Greece

The women's 100 metres event at the 2025 European Athletics U23 Championships was held in Bergen, Norway, at Fana Stadion on 17 and 18 July.

== Records ==
Prior to the competition, the records were as follows:

Record	Athlete (nation)	Time (s)	Location	Date
European U23 record	Marlies Oelsner (GDR)	10.88	Dresden, East Germany	1 July 1977
Championship U23 record	Maria Karastamati (GRE)	11.03	Erfurt, Germany	16 July 2005

== Results ==
=== Heats ===
First 3 in each heat (Q) and the next 4 fastest (q) qualified for the semi-finals.

==== Heat 1 ====
Place	Athlete	Nation	Time	Notes
1	Karolína Maňasová	Czech Republic	11.47	Q
2	Viola John	Germany	11.58	Q
3	Gaya Bertello	Italy	11.62	Q
4	Diana Honcharenko	Ukraine	11.68	
5	Beatriz Castelhano	Portugal	11.71	
6	Lina Hribar	Slovenia	11.82	
			Wind: (−0.6 m/s)	

==== Heat 2 ====
Place	Athlete	Nation	Time	Notes
1	Faith Akinbileje	Great Britain	11.42	Q
2	Emma Van Camp	Switzerland	11.48	Q
3	Lucy-May Sleeman	Ireland	11.57	Q
4	Amanda Obijiaku	Italy	11.58	q
5	Agáta Cellerová	Slovakia	11.80	
6	Alessandra Gasparelli	San Marino	11.82	
7	Andre Ožechauskaite	Lithuania	12.13	
			Wind: (−0.5 m/s)	

==== Heat 3 ====
Place	Athlete	Nation	Time	Notes
1	Nia Wedderburn-Goodison	Great Britain	11.52	Q
2	Aleksandra Piotrowska	Poland	11.57	Q
3	Sina Kammerschmitt	Germany	11.63	Q
4	Ema Rupšytė	Lithuania	11.70 [.693]	
5	Chloé Rabac	Switzerland	11.70 [.694]	
6	Rachele Torchio	Italy	11.75	
7	Anna Pursiainen	Finland	11.85	
			Wind: (−1.0 m/s)	

==== Heat 4 ====
Place	Athlete	Nation	Time	Notes
1	Jolina Ernst	Germany	11.43	Q
2	Polyniki Emmanouilidou	Greece	11.44	Q
3	Delia Farajpour	Slovakia	11.54	Q
4	Elena Guiu	Spain	11.55	q
5	Lucija Potnik	Slovenia	11.58	q
6	Soraya Becerra	Switzerland	11.59	q
			Wind: (+ m/s)	

=== Semi-finals ===
First 3 in each heat (Q) and the next 2 fastest (q) qualified for the semi-finals.

==== Heat 1 ====
Place	Athlete	Nation	Time	Notes
1	Karolína Maňasová	Czech Republic	11.49	Q
2	Faith Akinbileje	Great Britain	11.55	Q
3	Polyniki Emmanouilidou	Greece	11.55	Q
4	Delia Farajpour	Slovakia	11.67	
5	Viola John	Germany	11.70	
6	Amanda Obijiaku	Italy	11.74	
7	Soraya Becerra	Switzerland	11.74	
8	Sina Kammerschmitt	Germany	11.77	
			Wind: (−1.3 m/s)	

==== Heat 2 ====
Place	Athlete	Nation	Time	Notes
1	Gaya Bertello	Italy	11.44	Q
2	Nia Wedderburn-Goodison	Great Britain	11.51	Q
3	Jolina Ernst	Germany	11.61	Q
4	Aleksandra Piotrowska	Poland	11.66 [.652]	q
5	Lucija Potnik	Slovenia	11.66 [.656]	qD
5	Emma Van Camp	Switzerland	11.66 [.656]	
7	Elena Guiu	Spain	11.72	
8	Lucy-May Sleeman	Ireland	11.77	
			Wind: (−1.8 m/s)	

=== Final ===
Place	Athlete	Nation	Time	Notes
1st place, gold medalist(s)	Karolína Maňasová	Czech Republic	11.30	
2nd place, silver medalist(s)	Nia Wedderburn-Goodison	Great Britain	11.38	
3rd place, bronze medalist(s)	Polyniki Emmanouilidou	Greece	11.44	
4	Faith Akinbileje	Great Britain	11.50	
5	Jolina Ernst	Germany	11.54	
6	Lucija Potnik	Slovenia	11.56	
7	Aleksandra Piotrowska	Poland	11.61	
8	Gaya Bertello	Italy	11.82	
			Wind: (−1.3 m/s)	
