= Alexandra Burghardt =

German sprinter (born 1994)

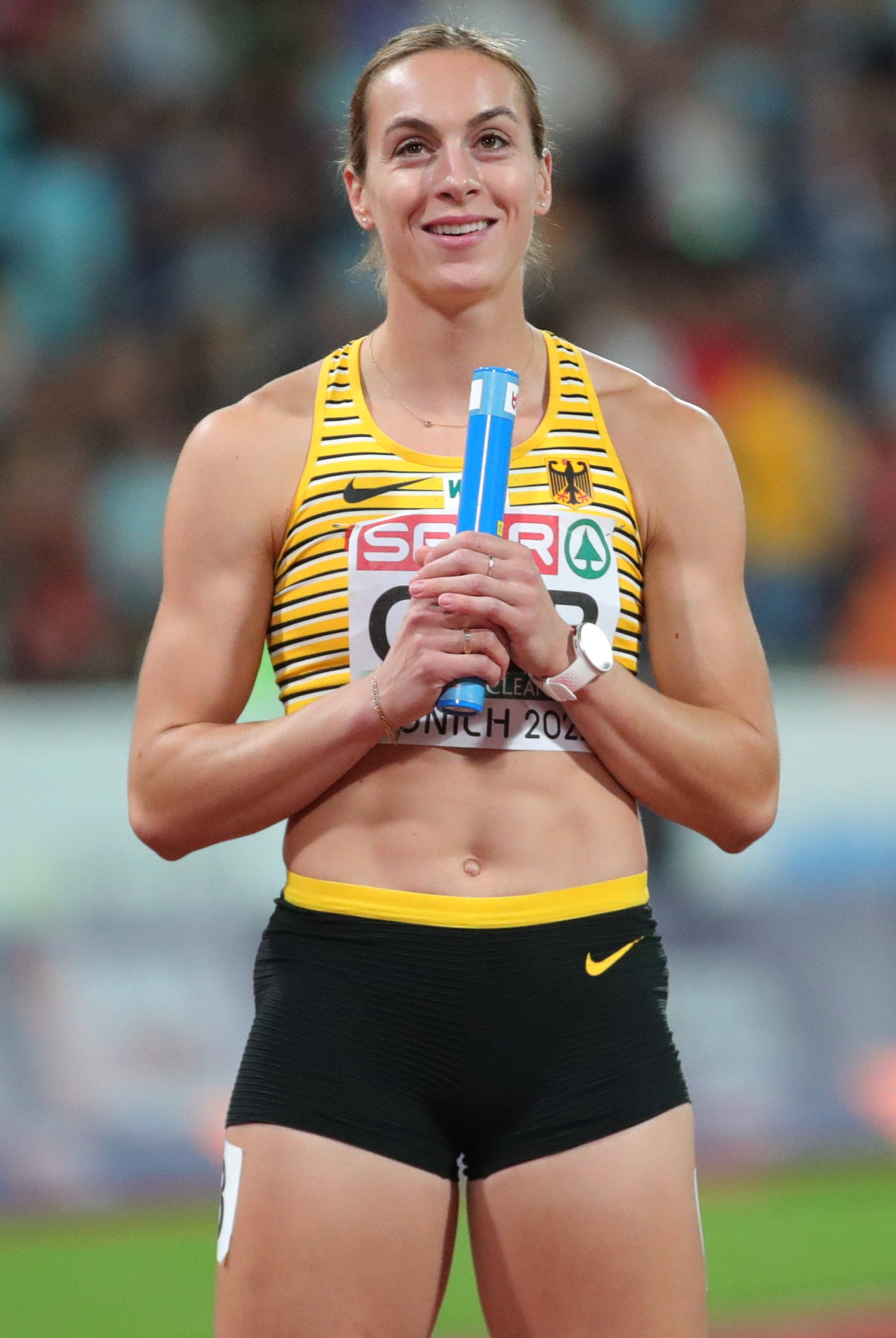
- Burghardt in Munich 2022

Personal information
- Born: 28 April 1994 (age 32) Mühldorf am Inn, Germany
- Height: 1.82 m (6 ft 0 in)
- Weight: 70 kg (154 lb)

Sport
- Country: Germany
- Sport: Athletics, bobsleigh
- Event: 100 metres
Medal record
Representing Germany
Women's bobsleigh
Olympic Games
Silver medal – second place	2022 Beijing	Two-woman
Women's athletics
Olympic Games
Bronze medal – third place	2024 Paris	4 × 100 m relay
World Championships
Bronze medal – third place	2022 Eugene	4 × 100 m relay
European Championships
Gold medal – first place	2022 Munich	4 × 100 m relay

Alexandra Burghardt (born 28 April 1994) is a German sprinter and bobsledder. She is the seventh athlete and fourth woman in history to win Olympic medals in both a summer sport and a winter sport.

== Career ==
She competed in the 4 × 100 metres relay at the 2015 World Championships in Beijing, finishing fifth in the final.

At the 2020 Summer Olympics in Tokyo, Burghardt finished fifth as a member of the 4 × 100 m relay on 6 August 2021. She returned to the bobsleigh track of the 2022 Winter Olympics in Beijing half a year later, winning the silver medal on 19 February 2022. After winning the bronze medal in athletics at the 2024 Summer Olympics in Paris, she became the seventh athlete and fourth woman in history to win Olympic medals in both a summer sport and a winter sport.

Burghardt was awarded the Bavarian Order of Merit in 2024.

== Athletics international competitions ==
Year	Competition	Venue	Position	Event	Notes
Representing Germany
2011	World Youth Championships	Lille, France	4th	100 m hurdles	13.42
2011	European Junior Championships	Tallinn, Estonia	1st	4 × 100 m relay	43.42
2012	World Junior Championships	Barcelona, Spain	19th (sf)	100 m hurdles	14.07
2012	World Junior Championships	Barcelona, Spain	2nd	4 × 100 m relay	44.24
2013	European Junior Championships	Rieti, Italy	8th (sf)	100 m	12.07
2013	European Junior Championships	Rieti, Italy	1st (h)	4 × 100 m relay	44.61^{1}
2015	European Indoor Championships	Prague, Czech Republic	9th (sf)	60 m	7.24
2015	European U23 Championships	Tallinn, Estonia	2nd	100 m	11.54
2015	European U23 Championships	Tallinn, Estonia	1st	4 × 100 m relay	43.47
2015	World Championships	Beijing, China	5th	4 × 100 m relay	42.64
2017	European Indoor Championships	Belgrade, Serbia	6th	60 m	7.19
2017	World Relays	Nassau, Bahamas	1st	4 × 100 m relay	42.84
2019	World Relays	Yokohama, Japan	3rd	4 × 100 m relay	43.68
2021	Olympic Games	Tokyo, Japan	11th (sf)	100 m	11.07
2021	Olympic Games	Tokyo, Japan	5th	4 × 100 m relay	42.12
2022	World Championships	Eugene, United States	31st (h)	100 m	11.29
2022	World Championships	Eugene, United States	3rd	4 × 100 m relay	42.03
2022	European Championships	Munich, Germany	8th	200 m	23.24
2022	European Championships	Munich, Germany	1st	4 × 100 m relay	42.34
2023	European Indoor Championships	Istanbul, Turkey	7th	60 m	7.24
2024	Olympic Games	Paris, France	3rd	4 × 100 m relay	41.97
2025	European Indoor Championships	Apeldoorn, Netherlands	30th (h)	60 m	7.31

^{1}Did not finish

== Bobsleigh international competitions ==
Year	Competition	Venue	Position	Event	Notes
Representing Germany
2022	Olympic Games	Beijing, China	2nd	Two-woman	4:04.73

== Personal bests ==
Outdoor

- 100 metres – 11.01 (+1.8 m/s, Bulle 2021)

Indoor

- 60 metres – 7.19 (Belgrade 2017)

== Team bests ==
Athletics

- 4 × 100 metres - 41.97

Bobsleigh

- Two-woman - 4:04.73
