= Polyniki Emmanouilidou =

Greek sprinter (born 2003)

Personal information
- Nationality: Greek
- Born: 30 June 2003 (age 23) Thessaloniki, Greece
- Height: 1.57 m (5 ft 2 in)
- Weight: 50 kg (110 lb)

Sport
- Sport: Athletics
- Events: 60m, 100m, 200m
- Club: ASS Alexandros Makedonias

Achievements and titles
- Personal bests: 60 m: 7.18 (2025); 100m: 11.21 (2023); 200m: 22.84 (2024)
Medal record
Women's athletics
Representing Greece
Mediterranean Games
Silver medal – second place	2026 Taranto	100 m
Silver medal – second place	2026 Taranto	4 x 100 m relay
Bronze medal – third place	2026 Taranto	4 x 100 m relay mixed

Polyniki Emmanouilidou (Greek: Πολυνίκη Εμμανoυηλίδου; born 30 June 2003), is a Greek sprinter. She competed in the 60 metres event at the 2023 European Athletics Indoor Championships in Istanbul.

== Honours & competition record ==
Year	Competition	Venue	Position	Event	Notes
Representing Greece
2022	World U20 Championships	Cali, Colombia	5th	200 m	23.42
2023	European Indoor Championships	Istanbul, Turkey	18th (sf)	60 m	7.34
2023	European Team Championships; Division 1	Chorzów, Poland	7th	100 m	11.30
2023	European Team Championships; Division 1	Chorzów, Poland	3rd	200 m	22.85 PB, NU23R
2023	European U23 Championships	Espoo, Finland	5th	100 m	11.40
2023	European U23 Championships	Espoo, Finland	3rd	200 m	23.41
2023	World Championships	Budapest, Hungary	22nd (sf)	200 m	23.15
2024	World Indoor Championships	Glasgow, United Kingdom	28th (h)	60 m	7.27
2024	European Championships	Rome, Italy	11th (sf)	100 m	11.21 =PB
2024	European Championships	Rome, Italy	8th	200 m	23.01
2024	Olympic Games	Paris, France	26th (h)	100 m	11.25
2025	European Indoor Championships	Apeldoorn, Netherlands	17th (sf)	60 m	7.22
2025	World Indoor Championships	Nanjing, China	20th (sf)	60 m	7.33
2025	European U23 Championships	Bergen, Norway	3rd	100 m	11.44
2025	European U23 Championships	Bergen, Norway	6th	200 m	23.25
2025	Balkan Championships	Volos, Greece	1st	200 m	23.01
2025	Balkan Championships	Volos, Greece	1st	4 × 100 m relay	43.77
2025	World Championships	Tokyo, Japan	33rd (h)	100 m	11.36
2025	World Championships	Tokyo, Japan	22nd (sf)	200 m	23.04
2026	European Championships	Birmingham, United Kingdom	13th (h)	100 m	11.31
2026	European Championships	Birmingham, United Kingdom	10th (sf)	200 m	23.06
2026	European Championships	Birmingham, United Kingdom	–	4 × 100 m relay	DNF
2026	Mediterranean Games	Taranto, Italy	2nd	100 m	11.41
2026	Mediterranean Games	Taranto, Italy	2nd	4 × 100 m relay	43.61
2026	Mediterranean Games	Taranto, Italy	3rd	4 × 100 m relay mixed	41.74 NR
