= Patrizia Van der Weken =

Luxembourgish sprinter

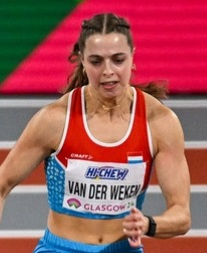
- Van der Weken in 2024

Personal information
- Nationality: Luxembourgish
- Born: 12 November 1999 (age 26)

Sport
- Sport: Track and field
- Events: 100 m, 200 m
- Coached by: Arnaud Starck
Medal record
World Indoor Championships
Bronze medal – third place	2025 Nanjing	60 m
European Indoor Championships
Bronze medal – third place	2025 Apeldoorn	60 m
Summer World University Games
Gold medal – first place	2021 Chengdu	100 m

Patrizia Van der Weken (born 12 November 1999) is a Luxembourgish sprinter who is a national record holder in the 100 metres and 200 metres events. In 2025, in the 60 metres event, she won bronze medals at both the World and European Championships.

== Career ==
Van der Weken participated in the 2023 European Athletics Indoor Championships, where she won her heat but was ultimately eliminated in the semifinals. Later that year, Van der Weken competed in the World Athletics Championships in Budapest, placing 33rd.

In 2024, she reached a World Indoor Championship final for the first time, placing seventh in the 60 metres in Glasgow - the best ever performance by a Luxembourgish athlete in the history of the championships at that point. She subsequently became the first Luxembourgish woman to reach a final at the European Athletics Championships, when she finished fourth in the 100 metres in that year's championships in Rome, missing out on a medal by 0.01 seconds and setting a new national record of 11 seconds flat in the semi-finals. A month later she won on her Diamond League debut, finishing first in the 100 metres at the Meeting de Paris.

Van der Weken made her Olympic debut at the 2024 Summer Olympics in Paris in the 100 metres event, where she progressed past her the heats and qualified for the semi-finals, becoming the first Luxembourgish women to do so. Her performance led to her being named Luxembourg's flagbearer for the closing ceremonies. She was also voted Luxembourg's Sportswoman of the Year for 2024, with her coach Arnaud Starck also being named the country's Coach of the Year.

Entering 2025, she showed strong form during the indoor athletics season, setting new national records in the 60 and 200 metres at the CMCM Luxembourg Indoor Meeting, her second competition of the year, and going on to take three wins in the World Athletics Indoor Tour in Ostrava, Karlsruhe and the final in Madrid and being crowned as Tour champion in the 60 metres.

On 9 March 2025, she won the bronze medal in the 60 metres event at the 2025 European Indoor Championships, becoming the first Luxembourgish to win a medal at an international indoor competition, and the third to win a medal in an international athletics event (Note: after Josy Barthel, Olympic champion in 1952, and David Fiegen, European silver medalist in 2006.)

On 22 March 2025, she won the bronze medal in the 60 metres event at the 2025 World Indoor Championships, becoming the first Luxembourgish to win a medal in that competition. In September 2025, she competed in the 100 metres at the 2025 World Championships in Tokyo, Japan.

In February 2026, at the Copernicus Cup in Toruń, she ran a personal best of 7.01 seconds for the 60 metres.

== Competition record ==
Year	Competition	Venue	Position	Event	Notes
Representing Luxembourg
2015	Games of the Small States of Europe	Reykjavík, Iceland	6th	100 m	12.23
2015	Games of the Small States of Europe	Reykjavík, Iceland	3rd	4 × 100 m relay	48.73
2016	European Youth Championships	Tbilisi, Georgia	7th	100 m	11.96
2016	European Youth Championships	Tbilisi, Georgia	32nd (h)	200 m	25.68
2017	Games of the Small States of Europe	Serravalle, San Marino	2nd	100 m	11.86
2017	Games of the Small States of Europe	Serravalle, San Marino	3rd	200 m	24.32
2017	Games of the Small States of Europe	Serravalle, San Marino	3rd	4 × 100 m relay	46.68
2017	European U20 Championships	Grosseto, Italy	14th (sf)	100 m	11.91
2017	European U20 Championships	Grosseto, Italy	28th (h)	200 m	24.82
2018	Championships of the Small States of Europe	Schaan, Liechtenstein	3rd	100 m	11.67
2018	World U20 Championships	Tampere, Finland	15th (sf)	100 m	11.70
2018	World U20 Championships	Tampere, Finland	18th (sf)	200 m	24.58
2019	European U23 Championships	Gävle, Sweden	9th (sf)	100 m	11.82
2019	European U23 Championships	Gävle, Sweden	23rd (h)	200 m	24.73
2021	Championships of the Small States of Europe	Serravalle, San Marino	1st	100 m	11.58
2021	Championships of the Small States of Europe	Serravalle, San Marino	1st	200 m	24.36
2021	European U23 Championships	Tallinn, Estonia	8th	100 m	11.73
2022	World Indoor Championships	Belgrade, Serbia	21st (sf)	60 m	7.28
2022	World Championships	Eugene, United States	36th (h)	100 m	11.34
2022	European Championships	Munich, Germany	17th (sf)	100 m	11.51
2023	European Indoor Championships	Istanbul, Turkey	10th (sf)	60 m	7.27
2023	Games of the Small States of Europe	Marsa, Malta	1st	100 m	11.11 (w)
2023	World University Games	Chengdu, China	1st	100 m	11.22
2023	World Championships	Budapest, Hungary	33rd (h)	100 m	11.38
2024	World Indoor Championships	Glasgow, United Kingdom	7th	60 m	7.15
2024	European Championships	Rome, Italy	4th	100 m	11.04
2024	Olympic Games	Paris, France	15th (sf)	100 m	11.13
2025	European Indoor Championships	Apeldoorn, Netherlands	3rd	60 m	7.06
2025	World Indoor Championships	Nanjing, China	3rd	60 m	7.07
2025	World Championships	Tokyo, Japan	29th (h)	100 m	11.29
2026	World Indoor Championships	Toruń, Poland	8th	60 m	7.10
2026	European Championships	Birmingham, United Kingdom	6th	100 m	11.10
2026	World Ultimate Championship	Budapest, Hungary	6th	100 m	11.06

== Personal bests ==
Outdoor

- 100 metres – 11.00 NR (+2.0 m/s, Rome, 2024)
- 200 metres – 23.19 NR (+1.0 m/s, Chorzów, 2023)

Indoor

- 60 metres – 7.01 NR (Torún, 22 February 2026)
- 200 metres – 23.17 NR (Kirchberg, 19 January 2025)
