= Lisa Mayer =

German sprinter (born 1996)

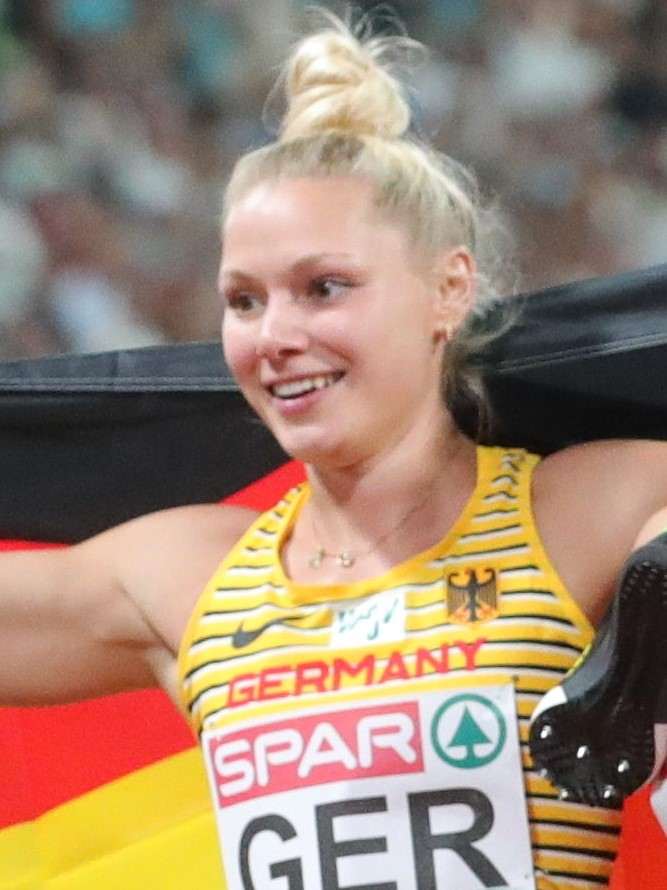
- Mayer in 2022

Personal information
- Nationality: German
- Born: 2 May 1996 (age 30) Gießen, Germany
- Height: 1.71 m (5 ft 7 in)
- Weight: 57 kg (126 lb)

Sport
- Country: Germany
- Sport: Track and field
- Events: 100 m, 200 m
- Club: LG Langgöns/Oberkleen
- Coached by: Rainer Finkernagel; Klaus Sommerlad
Medal record
Women's Athletics
Representing Germany
Olympic Games
Bronze medal – third place	2024 Paris	4 × 100 m relay
European Championships
Gold medal – first place	2022 Munich	4 × 100 m relay
Bronze medal – third place	2016 Amsterdam	4 × 100 m relay

Lisa Mayer (born 2 May 1996) is a German sprinter. She competed in the 200 metres at the 2016 European Athletics Championships, won a gold medal at the 2017 IAAF World Relays and has been the European Champion with the German 4 × 100 metres relay team since 2022.

== International competitions ==
Year	Competition	Venue	Position	Event	Notes
Representing Germany
2013	World Youth Championships	Donetsk, Ukraine	7th	200 m	24.12
2014	World Junior Championships	Eugene, United States	3rd	4 × 100 m relay	44.65
2015	European Junior Championships	Eskilstuna, Sweden	2nd	100 m	11.64
2015	European Junior Championships	Eskilstuna, Sweden	1st (h)	4 × 100 m relay	44.61^{1}
2016	European Championships	Amsterdam, Netherlands	8th	200 m	23.10
2016	European Championships	Amsterdam, Netherlands	3rd	4 × 100 m relay	42.48
2016	Olympic Games	Rio de Janeiro, Brazil	19th (sf)	200 m	22.90
2016	Olympic Games	Rio de Janeiro, Brazil	4th	4 × 100 m relay	42.10
2017	European Indoor Championships	Belgrade, Serbia	5th	60 m	7.19
2017	World Relays	Nassau, Bahamas	1st	4 × 100 m relay	42.84
2017	World Relays	Nassau, Bahamas	2nd (h)	4 × 200 m relay	1:31.16
2017	World Championships	London, United Kingdom	4th	4 × 100 m relay	42.36
2019	World Relays	Yokohama, Japan	2nd (h)	4 × 100 m relay	43.03
2022	European Championships	Munich, Germany	1st	4 × 100 m relay	42.34
2023	European Indoor Championships	Istanbul, Turkey	10th (sf)	60 m	7.27
2024	European Championships	Rome, Italy	2nd (h)	100 m	11.20^{2}
2024	European Championships	Rome, Italy	4th	4 × 100 m relay	42.61
2024	Olympic Games	Paris, France	3rd	4 × 100 m relay	41.97
2025	European Indoor Championships	Apeldoorn, Netherlands	24th (h)	60 m	7.49
2025	World Championships	Tokyo, Japan	41st (h)	100 m	29.34

^{1}Did not finish in the final
^{2}Did not start in the semifinals

Abbreviations: h = heat (Q, q), sf = semi-final

== Personal bests ==
Outdoor

- 100 metres – 11.12 (+1.7 m/s, Mannheim 15 May 2021)
- 200 metres – 22.64 (+1.7 m/s, Weinheim 27 May 2017)

Indoor

- 60 metres – 7.12 (Karlsruhe 3 February 2018)
- 200 metres – 23.30 (Leipzig 28 February 2016)
