= 2024 World Athletics Indoor Championships – Women's 60 metres =

Women's 60 metres at the 2024 World Athletics Indoor Championships
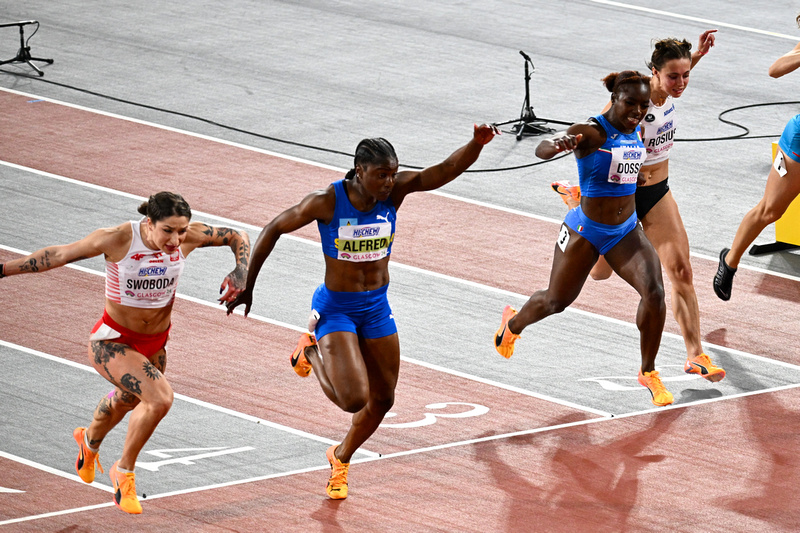
- Venue: Commonwealth Arena
- Dates: 2 March
- Competitors: 53 from 41 nations
- Winning time: 6.98

Medalists
gold medal	Julien Alfred	Saint Lucia
silver medal	Ewa Swoboda	Poland
bronze medal	Zaynab Dosso	Italy

The women's 60 metres at the 2024 World Athletics Indoor Championships took place on 2 March 2024.

== Results ==
=== Heats ===
Qualification: First 3 in each heat (Q) and the next 3 fastest (q) advance to the Semi-Finals. The heats started at 11:20.

==== Heat 1 ====
Rank	Lane	Athlete	Nation	Time	Notes
1	5	Géraldine Frey	Switzerland	7.15	Q, SB
2	6	Anthonique Strachan	Bahamas	7.24	Q
3	3	María Isabel Pérez	Spain	7.29	Q
4	4	Vitoria Cristina Rosa	Brazil	7.32	=SB
5	7	Monika Weigertová	Slovakia	7.35	
6	2	Anaís Hernández	Chile	7.48	
7	1	Macarena Giménez	Paraguay	7.59	
8	8	Jovita Arunia	Solomon Islands	8.19	NR

==== Heat 2 ====
Rank	Lane	Athlete	Nation	Time	Notes
1	4	Ewa Swoboda	Poland	7.02	Q
2	6	Briana Williams	Jamaica	7.22	Q
3	3	Boglárka Takács	Hungary	7.23	Q
4	2	Sade McCreath	Canada	7.30	
5	7	Beyonce DeFreitas	British Virgin Islands	7.44	
6	8	Alessandra Gasparelli	San Marino	7.45	
7	5	Ana Carolina Azevedo	Brazil	7.50	PB

==== Heat 3 ====
Rank	Lane	Athlete	Nation	Time	Notes
1	6	Julien Alfred	Saint Lucia	7.02	Q
2	5	Mikiah Brisco	United States	7.20	Q
3	3	N'Ketia Seedo	Netherlands	7.24	Q
4	7	Karolína Maňasová	Czech Republic	7.27	
5	4	Magdalena Lindner	Austria	7.46	
6	8	Guadalupe Torrez	Bolivia	7.50	
7	2	Aziza Sbaity	Lebanon	7.56	

==== Heat 4 ====
Rank	Lane	Athlete	Nation	Time	Notes
1	4	Rani Rosius	Belgium	7.12	Q, PB
2	3	Zoe Hobbs	New Zealand	7.15	Q, SB
3	2	Tristan Evelyn	Barbados	7.17	Q
4	5	Mélissa Gutschmidt	Switzerland	7.26	
5	6	Michelle-Lee Ahye	Trinidad and Tobago	7.26	=SB
6	7	Lotta Kemppinen	Finland	7.28	
7	8	Astrid Glenner-Frandsen	Denmark	7.54	

==== Heat 5 ====
Rank	Lane	Athlete	Nation	Time	Notes
1	4	Gina Bass	Gambia	7.15	Q, SB
2	5	Celera Barnes	United States	7.15	Q
3	3	Magdalena Stefanowicz	Poland	7.26	Q
4	7	Polyniki Emmanouilidou	Greece	7.27	
5	2	Amy Hunt	Great Britain	7.29	
6	6	Lorène Dorcas Bazolo	Portugal	7.33	
7	8	Dana Hussain	Iraq	7.51	SB
8	1	Marie-Charlotte Gastaud	Monaco	7.95	

==== Heat 6 ====
Rank	Lane	Athlete	Nation	Time	Notes
1	3	Zaynab Dosso	Italy	7.10	Q
2	5	Shashalee Forbes	Jamaica	7.17	Q
3	4	Delphine Nkansa	Belgium	7.22	Q
4	2	Audrey Leduc	Canada	7.22	q, =PB
5	7	Rosalina Santos	Portugal	7.32	
6	6	Viktória Forster	Slovakia	7.35	
7	1	Loi Im Lan	Macau	7.46	SB
8	8	Filomenaleonisa Iakopo	American Samoa	8.44	NR

==== Heat 7 ====
Rank	Lane	Athlete	Nation	Time	Notes
1	4	Aleia Hobbs	United States	7.07	Q
2	6	Patrizia van der Weken	Luxembourg	7.12	Q
3	1	Orlann Oliere	France	7.20	Q
4	5	Jaël Bestué	Spain	7.20	q
5	2	Õilme Võro	Estonia	7.24	q, NR
6	7	Helene Rønningen	Norway	7.26	PB
7	3	Ángela Gabriela Tenorio	Ecuador	7.33	
8	8	Zarinae Sapong	Northern Mariana Islands	8.33	PB

=== Semi-finals ===
Qualification: First 2 in each heat (Q) and the next 2 fastest (q) advance to the Final. The heats were started at 19:45.

==== Heat 1 ====
Rank	Lane	Athlete	Nation	Time	Notes
1	3	Ewa Swoboda	Poland	6.98	Q, WL, NR
2	5	Rani Rosius	Belgium	7.12	Q, =PB
3	4	Patrizia van der Weken	Luxembourg	7.13	q
4	6	Celera Barnes	United States	7.14	
5	2	Boglárka Takács	Hungary	7.21 [.207]	
6	8	Audrey Leduc	Canada	7.21 [.209]	
7	1	María Isabel Pérez	Spain	7.26	
8	7	Anthonique Strachan	Bahamas	7.36	

==== Heat 2 ====
Rank	Lane	Athlete	Nation	Time	Notes
1	4	Aleia Hobbs	United States	7.04	Q
2	5	Zaynab Dosso	Italy	7.05	Q
3	6	Zoe Hobbs	New Zealand	7.09	q, AR
4	2	Tristan Evelyn	Barbados	7.14	
5	3	Shashalee Forbes	Jamaica	7.15	
6	7	Orlann Oliere	France	7.18	
7	8	Jaël Bestué	Spain	7.24	
8	1	Magdalena Stefanowicz	Poland	7.37	

==== Heat 3 ====
Rank	Lane	Athlete	Nation	Time	Notes
1	3	Julien Alfred	Saint Lucia	7.03	Q
2	4	Mikiah Brisco	United States	7.10	Q
3	5	Géraldine Frey	Switzerland	7.16	
4	2	Briana Williams	Jamaica	7.19	
5	7	Delphine Nkansa	Belgium	7.21 [.207]	
6	6	Gina Bass	Gambia	7.21 [.208]	
7	8	N'Ketia Seedo	Netherlands	7.29	
8	1	Õilme Võro	Estonia	7.31	

=== Final ===
The final was started on 2 March at 21:45.

Rank	Lane	Name	Nationality	Time	Notes
1st place, gold medalist(s)	4	Julien Alfred	Saint Lucia	6.98	=WL
2nd place, silver medalist(s)	5	Ewa Swoboda	Poland	7.00	
3rd place, bronze medalist(s)	3	Zaynab Dosso	Italy	7.05	
4	8	Zoe Hobbs	New Zealand	7.06	AR
5	7	Mikiah Brisco	United States	7.08	
6	2	Rani Rosius	Belgium	7.14	
7	1	Patrizia van der Weken	Luxembourg	7.15	
	6	Aleia Hobbs	United States	DNS	
