= Delphine Nkansa =

Belgian athlete (born 2001)

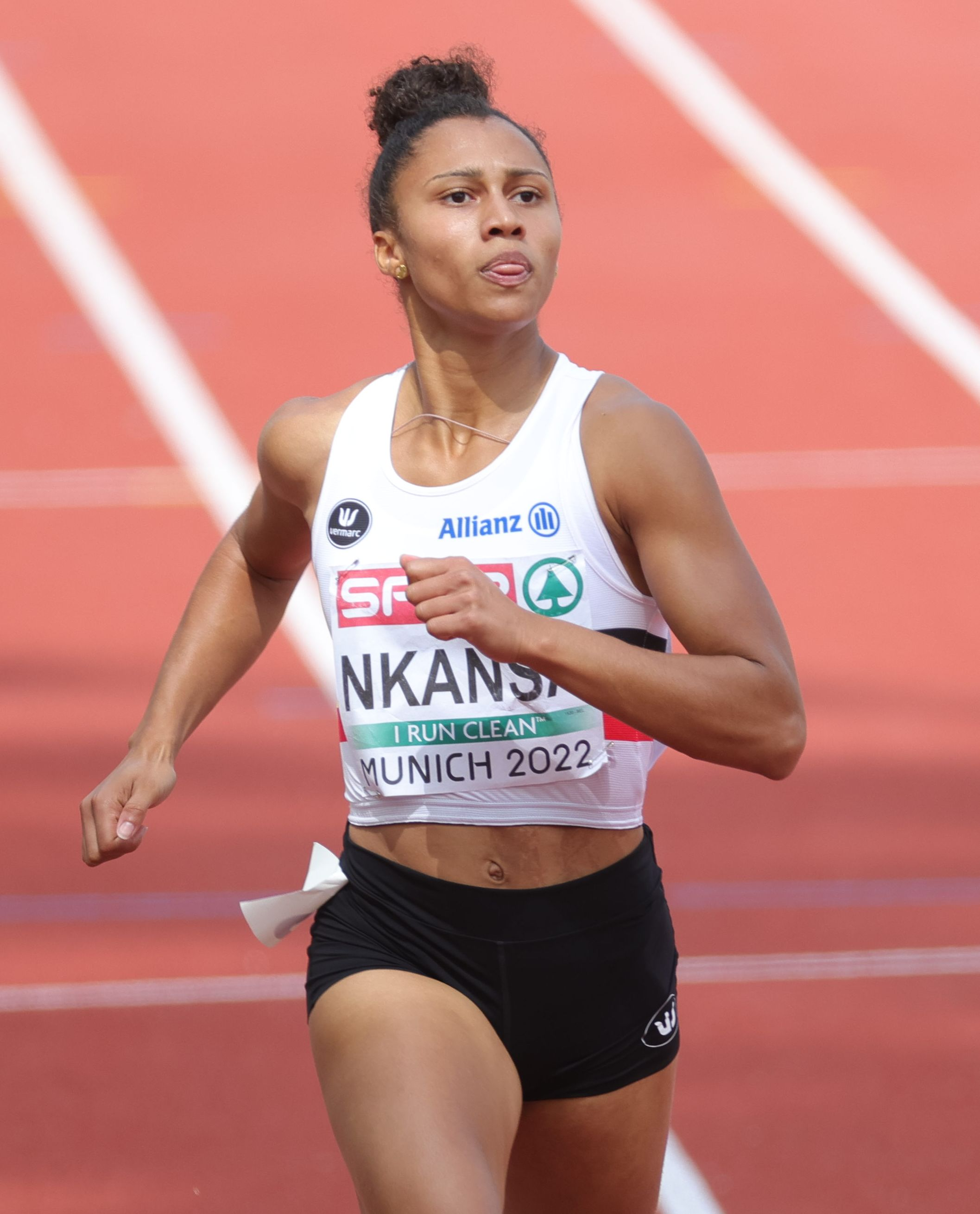
- Nkansa in 2022

Personal information
- Nationality: Belgian
- Born: 21 September 2001 (age 24)

Sport
- Sport: Track and Field
- Events: 100 m, 200 m
Medal record
Women's athletics
Representing Belgium
European Championships
Bronze medal – third place	2026 Birmingham	100 m
European U23 Championships
Gold medal – first place	2023 Espoo	200 m

Delphine Nkansa (born 21 September 2001) is a Belgian sprinter. She won the bronze medal at the 2026 European Championships in the 100 metres. She was the Belgian national champion over 200 metres in 2022 and the European Under-23 champion over that same distance in 2023.

== Personal life ==
Nkansa was born in Belgium to a Congolese father and Belgian mother. She grew up in Lisbon, Portugal after her family moved for her father's work. After achieving her baccalaureate in Lisbon, Nkansa moved to Paris to study law.

== Career ==
=== 2022 ===
Nkansa set a new personal best time of 23.03 seconds for the 200 metres in July 2022 in Albi, France. At the same event she improved her 100 m personal best to 11.26 seconds to make her second fastest Belgian woman of all time in the event behind only Kim Gevaert. Nkansa qualified from her 200 m heat at the 2022 European Athletics Championships in a time of 23.08 and was eleventh fastest in the semi-finals running 23.28. This matched her result in the 100 m as she qualified from the heat to the semi-finals and also finished eleventh fastest in a time of 11.39 seconds. Nkansa was part of the Belgian 4 × 100 metres relay team that qualified for the final with a seasons best time of 43.58 in the semi-final, before finishing sixth in the final.

=== 2023 ===
Nkansa ran a new personal best over 60 m of 7.24 seconds in January 2023. Soon afterwards she finished runner-up to Rani Rosius in the 60 m at the Belgian national indoors championships in February 2023. She was subsequently selected for the 2023 European Athletics Indoor Championships in March 2023, in which she qualified through the rounds for the final. She finished sixth in the final in a new personal best time of 7.19 seconds.

At the 2023 European Athletics U20 Championships in Espoo, Finland, Nkansa won the gold medal in the 200 metres. Selected for the 2023 World Athletics Championships in Budapest, she did not qualify for the semi-final of the 100 metres.

=== 2024 ===
She reached the semi-finals of the women's 60 metres at the 2024 World Athletics Indoor Championships in Glasgow. She ran as part of the Belgian 4 × 100 m relay team at the 2024 World Relays Championships in Nassau, Bahamas. She was selected for the 2024 European Athletics Championships in Rome in June 2024. She placed 4th in the European Championships semi-final in Rome in June 2024, not advancing to the final. She did post a personal record, covering 100 meters in 11.21s. She was also part of the Belgian 4 × 100 m relay team which qualified for the final. In June, she again broke her personal record at the 2024 Belgian Athletics Championships setting a time of 11.20s. Having qualified for the women's 100 metres at the 2024 Summer Olympic Games via the World Athletics Rankings, she qualified for the semi-finals by matching her PB and finishing 3rd in her round 1 heat. She finished 7th in her semi-final. She also ran in the women's 4 × 100 metres relay, the Belgian team also having qualified for the 2024 Summer Olympic Games via the World Athletics Rankings. The team was however disqualified in round 1 when Elise Mehuys passed the baton to her outside the takeover zone.

=== 2025 ===
She was selected for the 60 metres at the 2025 European Athletics Indoor Championships in Appeldoorn where she did not qualify for the semi-finals. She ran the anchor leg for the Belgian 4 × 100 m relay team at the 2025 World Athletics Relays as Belgium won their heat and qualified a team for the World Championships. She won the 100 metres for Belgium at the 2025 European Athletics Team Championships Second Division in Maribor on 28 June.

In September 2025, she competed in the women's 4 × 100 metres at the 2025 World Championships in Tokyo, Japan.

=== 2026 ===
Nkansa placed third over 60 metres in 7.29 seconds at the Belgian Indoor Championships. At the end of July, she crowned herself queen of Belgian sprint by winning both 100 and 200 metres Belgian national outdoor titles. Competing at the 2026 European Championships in Birmingham, England, Nkansa ran a personal best 11.06 seconds to place third in the final of the 100 metres, winning her first senior individual medal at a major championships. She also competed in the women's 4 × 100 metres relay at the championships, with Belgium placing fifth in the final. At the 2026 Diamond League Final in Brussels in September, she placed ninth in the 100 metres.

== Athletic Achievements ==
=== Personal bests ===
Type	Distance	Time (s)	Wind (m/s)	Venue	Date	Notes
Individual events
Indoor	60 metres	7.17	—N/a	Val-de-Reuil, France	2 February 2025	
Indoor	200 metres sh	23.36	—N/a	Metz, France	8 February 2026	
Outdoor	100 metres	11.06	+1.0	Birmingham, United Kingdom	10 August 2026	
Outdoor	200 metres	22.88	+1.1	Brussels, Belgium	3 August 2025	
Team events
Outdoor	4 × 100 metres relay	42.80	—N/a	Guangzhou, China	10 May 2025	

=== International competitions ===
Representing Belgium
Year	Competition	Venue	Position	Event	Time	Notes
2022	European Championships	Munich, Germany	11th (sf)	100 m	11.39	
2022	European Championships	Munich, Germany	11th (sf)	200 m	23.28	
2022	European Championships	Munich, Germany	6th	4 × 400 m relay	43.98	
2023	European Indoor Championships	Istanbul, Türkiye	6th	60 m	7.19	PB
2023	European U23 Championships	Espoo, Finland	4th	100 m	11.36	
2023	European U23 Championships	Espoo, Finland	1st	200 m	23.31	
2023	European U23 Championships	Espoo, Finland	5th	4 × 400 m relay	43.66	NU23R
2023	World Championships	Budapest, Hungary	35th (h)	100 m	11.40	
2024	World Indoor Championships	Glasgow, United Kingdom	15th (sf)	60 m	7.21	
2024	World Relays	Nassau, Bahamas	—	4 × 100 m relay	DQ (Re)	TR 24.7
2024	World Relays	Nassau, Bahamas	8th	4 × 100 m relay	43.17	
2024	European Championships	Rome, Italy	12th (sf)	100 m	11.21	PB
2024	European Championships	Rome, Italy	6th	4 × 100 m relay	43.48	
2024	Olympic Games	Paris, France	19th (sf)	100 m	11.28	
2024	Olympic Games	Paris, France	—	4 × 100 m relay	DQ	TR 24.7
2025	European Indoor Championships	Apeldoorn, Netherlands	26th (h)	60 m	7.28	
2025	World Relays	Guangzhou, China	6th	4 × 100 m relay	42.85	
2025	European Team Championships Second Division	Maribor, Slovenia	1st	100 m	11.42	
2025	European Team Championships Second Division	Maribor, Slovenia	1st	4 × 100 m relay	43.46	SB
2025	World Championships	Tokyo, Japan	—	4 × 100 m relay	DQ	TR24.7[L]
2026	European Championships	Birmingham, United Kingdom	3rd	100 m	11.06	PB
2026	European Championships	Birmingham, United Kingdom	16th (h)	200 m	23.41	
2026	European Championships	Birmingham, United Kingdom	5th	4 × 100 m relay	43.31	

=== National championships and competitions ===
Year	Competition	Venue	Position	Event	Time	Notes
2017	Portuguese U18 Indoor Championships	Pombal	4th	60 m	8.00	
2017	Portuguese U18 Championships	Abrantes	1st	100 m	11.92	
2017	Portuguese U18 Championships	Abrantes	1st	200 m	24.91	
2017	Portuguese U20 Championships	Marinha Grande	2nd	100 m	12.08	
2017	Portuguese U20 Championships	Marinha Grande	3rd	200 m	24.96	
2018	Portuguese U18 Indoor Championships	Pombal	1st	60 m	7.50	
2018	Portuguese U20 Indoor Championships	Pombal	1st	60 m	7.60	
2018	Portuguese U20 Indoor Championships	Pombal	1st	200 m sh	24.60	
2019	Portuguese Indoor Championships	Pombal	—	60 m	7.48	OC
2019	Portuguese U23 Championships	Vagos	2nd	100 m	11.90	
2019	Portuguese U20 Championships	Vagos	1st	100 m	11.69	
2019	Portuguese U20 Championships	Vagos	3rd	200 m	24.47	
2019	Portuguese Championship	Lisbon	—	100 m	11.71	OC
2019	Portuguese Championship	Lisbon	—	200 m	24.41	OC
2020	French U20 Indoor Championships	Miramas	2nd	60 m	7.52	
2020	French Indoor Championships	Liévin	—	60 m	7.57	OC
2021	French U23 Championships	Caen	1st	100 m	11.73	
2022	French U23 Indoor Championships	Lyon	7th	60 m	7.49	
2022	French Indoor Championships	Miramas	—	60 m	7.46	OC
2022	Belgian Championships	Gentbrugge	2nd	100 m	11.42	
2022	Belgian Championships	Gentbrugge	1st	200 m	23.34	
2022	French U23 Championships	Albi	2nd	100 m	11.23	
2022	French U23 Championships	Albi	1st	200 m	23.03	
2023	Belgian Indoor Championships	Ghent	2nd	60 m	7.28	
2023	French U23 Championships	Fontainebleau	2nd	200 m	23.42	
2023	Belgian Championships	Bruges	1st	100 m	11.03	
2023	Belgian Championships	Bruges	—	200 m	DNS	
2024	Belgian Championships	Brussels	1st	100 m	11.20	
2025	Belgian Championships	Brussels	3rd	100 m	11.32	
2025	Belgian Championships	Brussels	2nd	200 m	22.88	
2026	Belgian Indoor Championships	Louvain-la-Neuve	3rd	60 m	7.29	
2026	Belgian Championships	Kessel-Lo	1st	100 m	11.13	
2026	Belgian Championships	Kessel-Lo	2nd	200 m	23.58	
