= Olivia Fotopoulou =

Cypriot athlete (born 1996)

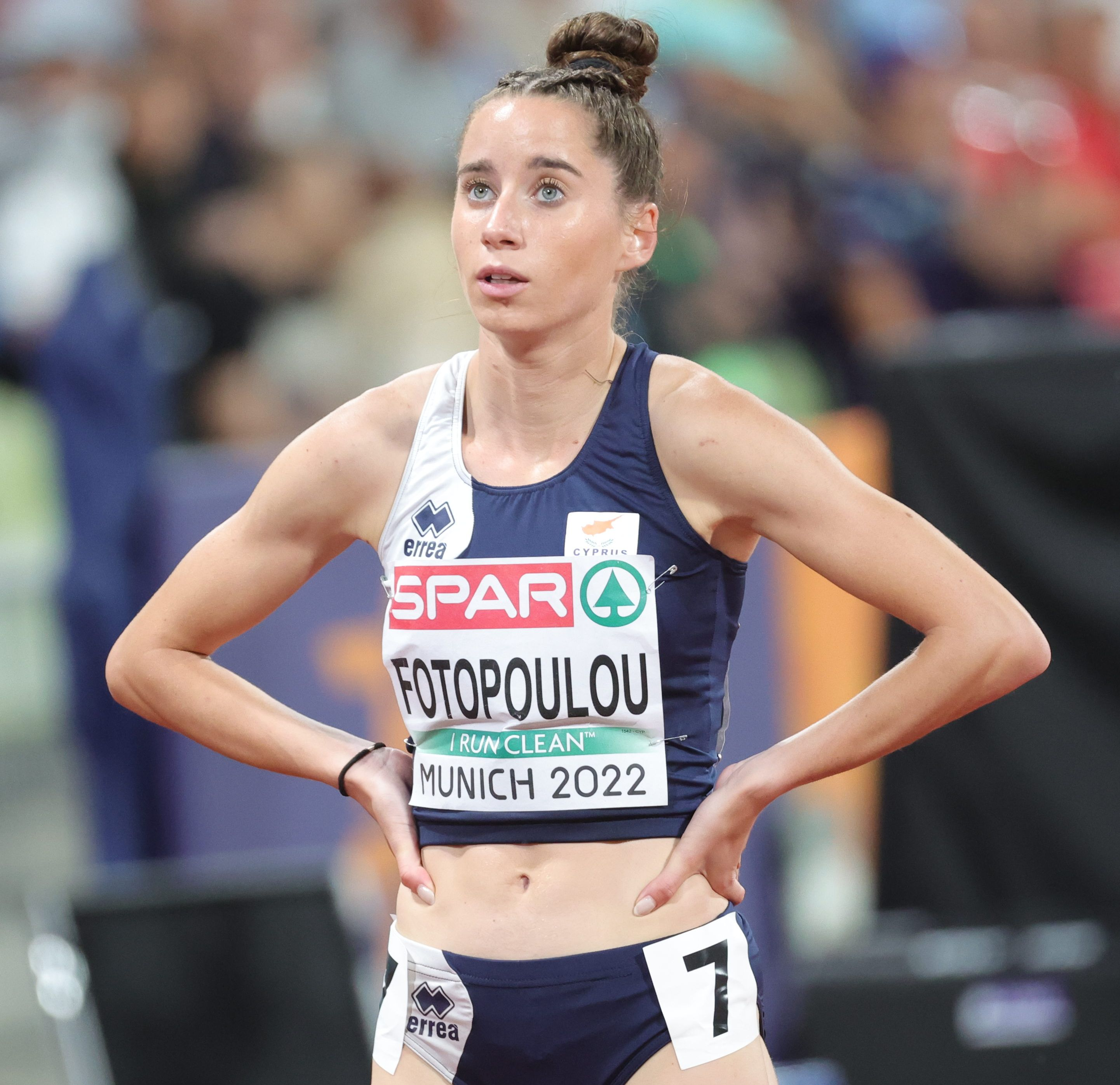
- Fotopoulou in 2022

Personal information
- Nationality: Cyprus
- Born: 20 December 1996 (age 29) Limassol, Cyprus

Sport
- Sport: Athletics
- Event: Sprint

Achievements and titles
- Personal bests: 100m: 11.25 (Nicosia, 2023); 200m: 22.65 (Budapest, 2023)
Medal record
Women's athletics
Representing Cyprus
European Games
Silver medal – second place	2023 Kraków-Małopolska	200 m
Mediterranean Games
Silver medal – second place	2022 Oran	200 m
Bronze medal – third place	2022 Oran	100 m
Bronze medal – third place	2022 Oran	4x100 m

Olivia Fotopoulou (Greek: Ολίβια Φωτοπούλου; born 20 December 1996) is a Cypriot track and field athlete who competes as a sprinter. She is a multiple time national champion in the 100 metres and 200 metres. She competed at the 2024 Olympic Games.

== Biography ==
In June 2022, Fotopoulou won a bronze medal in the 100 metres at the 2022 Mediterranean Games. She competed in the 200m at the 2022 World Athletics Championships in Eugene, Oregon in July, running 23.25s in the first round. The following month she competed at the 2022 European Athletics Championships in Munich running 23.33s in the semi-finals over 200m.

Competing at the 2023 European Athletics Indoor Championships in Istanbul in March 2023, Fotopoulou ran 7.36s in the semi-finals of the 60 meters. In June 2023, she finished second with a time of 11.34s in the 100 meters in the 2nd division of the 2023 European Team Championships in Chorzów and was first in the 200 meters, running 22.71s, securing the silver medal overall, behind only Lieke Klaver. Fotopoulou competed in both sprint events at the 2023 World Athletics Championships in Budapest in August 2023 and qualified for the semi-finals of the 200 metres with a personal best time of 22.65s.

Fotopoulou competed for Cyprus at the 2024 Summer Olympics in Paris over 200 metres, reaching the semi-finals. She also competed in the 100 metres race at the Games.

Fotopoulou was selected for the 60 metres at the 2025 European Athletics Indoor Championships in Appeldoorn, Netherlands but did not progress to the semi-finals. In September 2025, she was a semi-finalist in the 200 metres at the 2025 World Championships in Tokyo, Japan.

In May 2026, Fotopoulou won the 200m in 23.48 seconds at the European Challenger Championships in Monaco, before teaming up with her twin sister to win the Swedish relay for Cyprus. She was a semi-finalist in the 200 metres at the 2026 Commonwealth Games in Glasgow, Scotland.

== Personal life ==
Her twin sister Filippa Fotopoulou is also an international athlete, competing in the long jump. Both sisters studied together at the University of Alabama.
