= Julia Henriksson =

Swedish sprinter (born 2000)

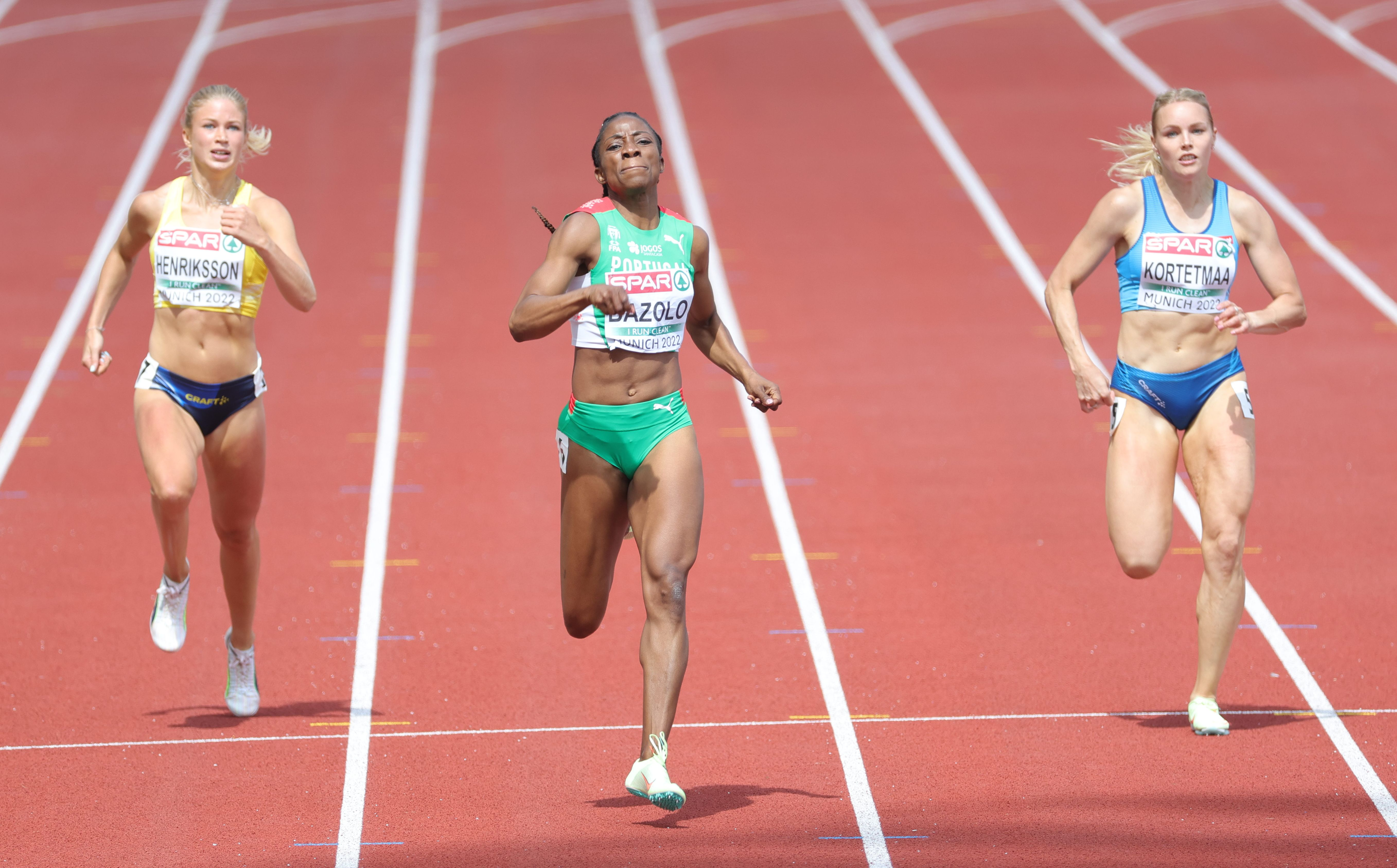
- Henriksson in 2022

Personal information
- Nationality: Swedish
- Born: 11 July 2000 (age 26)
- Height: 1.68 m (5 ft 6 in)

Sport
- Sport: Athletics
- Event: Sprint

Achievements and titles
- Personal bests: 60m: 7.22 (Karlstad, 2024); 100m: 11.19 (Athens, 2024); 200m: 22.69 (Sollentuna, 2024)

Julia Henriksson (born 11 July 2000) is a Swedish athlete who competes as a sprinter. She has won Swedish national champion titles at 60m, 100m and 200m and is the Swedish indoors national record holder over 200 metres and joint record holder outdoors over 200 metres.

== Early life ==
From Bjuv, Henriksson was a promising junior athlete but stopped athletics completely in high school, and didn't race at all in 2016 and 2017. She started training again after her hiatus and started training full-time in 2019. She again had to pause her training to recover from stress fractures to her foot, in 2020.

== Career ==
Competing in Mölndal in August 2021, Henriksson ran 100m in 11.37s which moved her up to fifth all-time by Swedish women and made her the fastest Swedish woman since 2014. Henriksson won the Swedish national 100m title in Norrköping in August 2022, with a time of 11.55 seconds.

After making her debut at a major championship by competing at the 2022 European Athletics Championships in Munich, albeit without qualifying in her heat, Henriksson set a new personal best 200m time of 23.15 in Helsinki.

In January 2023, at the Quality Hotel Games in Växjö, she achieved an indoor 200m time of 23.32s, a time that placed her second on Sweden's all-time list. The following month, she lowered her personal best indoor 200m time again, to 23.26 before claiming national championship title victories in 60m and 200m in Malmö. This included a new personal best time of 7.30s for the 60m.

Henriksson qualified for the semi-finals in the 60m at the 2023 European Athletics Indoor Championships in Istanbul in March 2023.

Henriksson competed in the 200m at the Diamond League event in Stockholm in July 2023, finishing seventh. She competed in the 200 metres at the 2023 World Athletics Championships in Budapest in August 2023.

In Karlstad in February 2024, she set a new personal best for 60m of 7.22 seconds, and, for 200 metres, of 23.03 seconds, an indoor national record. In May 2024, she lowered her personal 100m best to 11.19 in Athens. She finished second in the 200m and fifth in the 100m at the 2024 Diamond League event in Stockholm.

She finished sixth in the final of the 200m at the European Athletics Championships in Rome in June 2024, having equaled the Swedish national record of 22.82 seconds in the semi-final. She broke the Swedish national record while competing at the 2024 Summer Olympics in Paris in the 200m, reaching the semi-finals. She also competed in the 100m at the Games.

Henirksson set a new indoor national record of 22.84 seconds while winning the 200m title at the Swedish Indoor Championships in February 2025. She reached the semi-finals of the 60 metres at the 2025 World Athletics Indoor Championships in Nanjing.

In September 2025, she competed in the 100 metres at the 2025 World Championships in Tokyo, Japan. She also ran in the women's 200 metres at the championships, reaching the semi-finals.

Henriksson won the 200 metres and placed second to Nora Lindahl over 60 metres at the 2026 Swedish Indoor Championships in Stockholm.

== Personal life ==
Henriksson trained with IFK Helsingborg; however, due to financial concerns after the COVID-19 pandemic, the athletic club had to halt investment in athletes. As a result, Henriksson began supplementing her income by working as a receptionist at a health centre in 2022.
