= Mollie O'Reilly =

Irish sprinter (born 1998)

Molly O'Reilly
Personal information
- Nationality: Irish
- Born: 10 December 1998 (age 27)

Sport
- Sport: Athletics
- Event: Sprints

Achievements and titles
- Personal bests: 60m: 7.40 (2026); 100m: 11.54 (2026); 200m: 23.80 (2025)

Mollie O'Reilly (born 10 December 1998) is an Irish sprinter.

== Biography ==
O’Reilly started in athletics at a young age. She competed at Irish national finals in Athlone at under-12 level, winning bronze behind Molly Scott and Gina Akpe-Moses. She won an Irish schools' title in 2016 over 400 metres and represented Ireland at the 2016 IAAF World U20 Championships, running 54.92 seconds for the 400 m at the age of 17 years-old. A member of Dundrum South Dublin Athletics Club, and was initially coached by Liz McDonagh, but in 2018 moved to train with Daniel Kilgallon in Tallaght, however her progress was halted by injury.

O'Reilly suffered from a succession of foot metatarsal problems which she described as "five years of stress fractures", and trained as a physiotherapist. An aborted return to action in 2021 led to get foot problem returning again. She made the decision to transition to shorter sprints, and earned h made senior Ireland international debut competing in the 4 × 100 m relay at the 2023 European Games, with her relay team finishing second in the Third Division.

In June 2024, O'Reilly placed third at the Irish Championships over 100 metres, finishing behind Rhasidat Adeleke and Sarah Lavin but finishing ahead of Gina Akpe-Moses in a lifetime best of 11.61 seconds. In August 2025, she placed third again in the Irish Championships 100 metres final, running 11.60 seconds behind Ciara Neville and Lauren Roy.

On 28 February 2026, O'Reilly placed third in the 200 metres at the Irish Indoor Athletics Championships in 24.14 seconds finishing behind Sophie Becker and Molly Daly. She was named in the Irish team for the 2026 World Athletics Relays in Botswana, and ran in the women's 4 × 100 m relay. On 25 July, she placed second in the 100 metres at the 2026 Irish Outdoor Championships behind defending champion Ciara Neville, running 11.63 seconds into a headwind.
