= 2018 IAAF World U20 Championships – Women's 4 × 100 metres relay =

Women's 4 × 100 metres relay at the 2018 World U20 Championships
- Venue: Ratina Stadium
- Dates: 13 July (heats); 14 July (final)
- Competitors: 62 from 14 nations
- Winning time: 43.82

Medalists
gold medal	Victoria Dönicke; Corinna Schwab; Sophia Junk; Denise Uphoff; Keshia Beverly Kwadwo*	Germany
silver medal	Molly Scott; Gina Akpe-Moses; Ciara Neville; Patience Jumbo-Gula; Rhasidat Adeleke*	Ireland
bronze medal	Kristal Awuah; Alisha Rees; Georgina Adam; Ebony Carr; Mair Edwards*; Vera Chinedu*	Great Britain

The women's 4 × 100 metres relay at the 2018 IAAF World U20 Championships was held at Ratina Stadium on 13 and 14 July.

== Records ==
Standing records prior to the 2018 IAAF World U20 Championships in Athletics
World U20 Record	Germany	43.27	Grosseto, Italy	23 July 2017
Championship Record	Jamaica	43.40	Kingston, Jamaica	21 July 2002
World U20 Leading	Ireland	44.15	Oordegem, Belgium	26 May 2018

== Results ==
=== Heats ===
Qualification: First 3 of each heat ( Q ) plus the 2 fastest times ( q ) qualify for the final.

Rank	Heat	Lane	Nation	Athletes	Time	Notes
1	1	2	Germany	Victoria Dönicke, Keshia Beverly Kwadwo, Sophia Junk, Corinna Schwab	43.80	Q, WU20L
2	2	4	Ireland	Molly Scott, Gina Akpe-Moses, Rhasidat Adeleke, Patience Jumbo-Gula	44.27	Q
3	2	5	Italy	Vittoria Fontana, Moillet Kouakou, Alessia Carpinteri, Margherita Zuecco	44.52	Q, NU20R
4	2	2	France	Wided Atatou, Sacha Alessandrini, Marine Mignon, Eleane Marcelin	44.80	Q, SB
5	1	3	Great Britain	Kristal Awuah, Mair Edwards, Vera Chinedu, Ebony Carr	44.84	Q
6	1	5	Switzerland	Judith Goll, Silke Lemmens, Veronica Vancardo, Mélissa Gutschmidt	45.01	Q, SB
7	2	8	Poland	Pia Skrzyszowska, Magdalena Stefanowicz, Alicja Potasznik, Anna Pluschke	45.19	q
8	1	4	Australia	Nana-Adoma Owusu-Afriyie, Kristie Edwards, Samantha Johnson, Grace Brennan	45.26	q, SB
9	2	3	Brazil	Micaela de Mello, Gabriela Mourão, Leticia Lima, Tiffani Silva	45.28	
10	1	7	Canada	Keira Christie-Galloway, Deondra Green, Kendra Leger, Tatiana Aholou	45.68	
11	2	6	Austria	Lena Pressler, Isabel Posch, Magdalena Lindner, Chiara-Belinda Schuler	45.99	
	1	8	China	Lin Yuwei, Zhou Yu, Liang Nuo, Feng Lulu	DQ	R163.3(b)
	2	7	Jamaica	Kimone Shaw, Ackera Nugent, Fredricka McKenzie, Kemba Nelson	DQ	R163.3(a)
	1	6	United States	Daija Lampkin, Tamara Clark, Jasmin Reed, Thelma Davies	DQ	R170.6(c)

=== Final ===
The final was held on 14 July at 16:01.

Rank	Lane	Nation	Athletes	Time	Notes
1st place, gold medalist(s)	6	Germany	Victoria Dönicke, Corinna Schwab, Sophia Junk, Denise Uphoff	43.82	
2nd place, silver medalist(s)	5	Ireland	Molly Scott, Gina Akpe-Moses, Ciara Neville, Patience Jumbo-Gula	43.90	NU20R
3rd place, bronze medalist(s)	3	Great Britain	Kristal Awuah, Alisha Rees, Georgina Adam, Ebony Carr	44.05	SB
4	8	France	Wided Atatou, Sacha Alessandrini, Marine Mignon, Eleane Marcelin	44.24	SB
5	1	Poland	Pia Skrzyszowska, Magdalena Stefanowicz, Alicja Potasznik, Martyna Kotwiła	44.61	SB
6	7	Switzerland	Judith Goll, Silke Lemmens, Veronica Vancardo, Mélissa Gutschmidt	44.65	SB
7	2	Australia	Nana-Adoma Owusu-Afriyie, Kristie Edwards, Samantha Johnson, Mia Gross	44.78	OCU20R
8	4	Italy	Vittoria Fontana, Moillet Kouakou, Alessia Carpinteri, Margherita Zuecco	44.81	
