= Precious Akpe-Moses =

Irish sprinter (born 2006)

Personal information
- Nationality: Irish
- Born: 9 July 2006 (age 20)

Sport
- Sport: Athletics
- Event: 100 metres 200 metres
- Club: Blackrock AC & Birchfield Harriers

Achievements and titles
- Personal bests: 60m: 7.33 (2026); 100m: 11.62 (2025); 200m: 23.60 (2025)

Precious Akpe-Moses (born 9 July 2006) is an Irish sprinter. She was runner-up in the 60 metres at the Irish Indoor Athletics Championships in 2026.

== Biography ==
Competing for Birchfield Harriers, Akpe-Moses won the U20 English Indoor Championships over 200 metres in February 2024 in a personal best time of 24.43 seconds.

Competing for Blackrock Athletics Club at the Irish U-20 Championships in Tullamore in July 2025, she won the 100 metres in 11.64 seconds and set a championship record of 23.66 seconds in the 200m. At the 2025 European Athletics U20 Championships in Tampere she ran in the women's 100m, running 11.66 seconds to finish second in her heat to secure automatic qualification to the semi-finals in a time 0.02 below her personal best despite running into a -2.0 m/s headwind. After qualifying for the final with another personal best (11.62) she placed seventh overall. She ran a 23.60 seconds (+0.2) personal best to reach the final of the 200 metres at the championships, before placing fourth overall. She also ran for Irish 4 × 100 m relay team which qualified for the final.

On 1 March 2026, Akpe-Moses was runner-up in the 60 metres at the Irish Indoor Athletics Championships in 7.33 seconds finishing behind Ciara Neville and ahead of championship record holder Molly Scott and defending champion Sarah Leahy. She was named in the Irish team for the 2026 World Athletics Relays in Botswana, running in the women's 4 x 100 metres relay. In May, she won the 200 metres race for Birchfield Harriers at the National Athletics League opener in Derby, and also placed second to Joy Eze over 100 metres at the meet.

== Personal life ==
Akpe-Moses is the younger sister of former European U-20 100m champion Gina Akpe-Moses.
