= 2026 European Athletics Championships – Women's 4 × 100 metres relay =

Women's 4 × 100 metres relay at the 2026 European Athletics Championships
- Venue: Alexander Stadium
- Location: Birmingham, United Kingdom
- Dates: 15 August 2026
- Nations: 16
- Winning time: 42.05 EL

Medalists
gold medal	Dina Asher-Smith (final only); Amy Hunt; Success Eduan; Imani Lansiquot; Kristal Awuah (heats only)	Great Britain
silver medal	Géraldine Di Tizio-Frey; Fabienne Hoenke (final only); Léonie Pointet; Salomé Kora; Ajla Del Ponte (heats only)	Switzerland
bronze medal	Krystsina Tsimanouskaya; Pia Skrzyszowska (final only); Magdalena Stefanowicz; Ewa Swoboda; Wiktoria Gajosz (heats only)	Poland

The women's 4 × 100 metres relay at the 2026 European Athletics Championships took place over two rounds at the Alexander Stadium in Birmingham, United Kingdom, on 15 August 2026.

== Background ==
Records before the 2026 European Athletics Championships
Record	Athlete (nation)	Time	Location	Date
World record	United States (Tianna Madison, Allyson Felix, Bianca Knight, Carmelita Jeter)	40.82	London, United Kingdom	10 August 2012
European record	East Germany (Silke Gladisch, Sabine Rieger, Ingrid Auerswald, Marlies Göhr)	41.37	Canberra, Australia	6 October 1985
Championship record	East Germany (Silke Möller, Katrin Krabbe, Kerstin Behrendt, Sabine Günther)	41.68	Split, Yugoslavia	1 September 1990
World leading	(United States) USC Trojans (Dajaz Defrand, Mia Brahe-Pedersen, Madison Whyte, Brianna Selby)	41.58	Eugene, United States	13 June 2026
European leading	Great Britain (Dina Asher-Smith, Amy Hunt, Success Eduan, Imani Lansiquot)	42.06	London, United Kingdom	18 July 2026

== Qualification ==
For the women's 4 × 100 metres relay, the qualification period is from 1 January 2025 to 26 July 2026. The qualification procedure will be based on the aggregate of the two fastest times achieved by national teams in the qualification period. For being ranked, the results of relay races shall be valid only on condition that they are part of a competition staged in compliance with World Athletics Rules (and included into World Athletics Global Calendar) and that at least 2 international teams, representing at least 2 countries compete in the race. A total of 16 national teams can compete in the event. Host nation Great Britain has the right to be represented with one national team in the event. If they wish to participate and are not qualified as indicated above, the number of national teams to qualify will be reduced to 15.

Qualification standings per 31 July 2026
QP	Country	Athletes	Status	Accumulated times	Result 1	Result 2
1	Great Britain & N.I.		Allocated to Host Country			
2	Germany		Qualified by European Ranking	83.73	41.86	41.87
3	Spain		Qualified by European Ranking	84.29	42.11	42.18
4	Netherlands		Qualified by European Ranking	84.62	42.02	42.60
5	Italy		Qualified by European Ranking	85.19	42.58	42.61
6	Belgium		Qualified by European Ranking	85.65	42.80	42.85
7	Poland		Qualified by European Ranking	85.67	42.83	42.84
8	Switzerland		Qualified by European Ranking	85.68	42.81	42.87
9	Portugal		Qualified by European Ranking	86.55	43.11	43.44
10	Hungary		Qualified by European Ranking	86.65	43.32	43.33
11	Austria		Qualified by European Ranking	86.88	43.11	43.77
12	Greece		Qualified by European Ranking	87.03	43.26	43.77
13	Ireland		Qualified by European Ranking	87.62	43.73	43.89
14	Slovakia		Qualified by European Ranking	87.98	43.95	44.03
15	Finland		Qualified by European Ranking	88.00	43.99	44.01
16	Denmark		Qualified by European Ranking	88.49	43.94	44.55

== Schedule ==
Date	Time	Round
15 August 2026	12:40	Round 1
15 August 2026	21:48	Final

All times are local times (UTC+1)

== Results ==
=== Round 1 ===
Round 1 was held on 15 August 2026, at 12:40 in the afternoon. First 3 in each heat (Q) and the next 2 fastest (q) advanced to the final.

==== Heat 1 ====
Place	Lane	Nation	Athletes	Time	Notes
1	2	Italy	Alice Pagliarini, Gloria Hooper, Dalia Kaddari, Alessia Pavese	42.22	Q, SB
2	3	Great Britain & N.I.	Kristal Awuah, Amy Hunt, Success Eduan, Imani Lansiquot	42.37	Q
3	5	Portugal	Lorène Dorcas Bazolo, Tatjana Pinto, Beatriz Castelhano, Arialis Gandulla	43.06	Q, NR
4	9	Ireland	Lucy-May Sleeman, Ciara Neville, Sarah Leahy, Lauren Roy	43.13	q, NR
5	7	Austria	Karin Strametz, Magdalena Lindner, Christania Williams, Isabel Posch	43.37	
6	8	Denmark	Mette Graversgaard, Amaya Kruse Jørgensen, Ronja Christophersen, Annika Baun Haldbo	43.49	SB
7	6	Finland	Saara Keskitalo, Lotta Kemppinen, Tessa Moisio, Nooralotta Neziri	43.78	SB
8	4	Netherlands	Isabel van den Berg, Britt de Blaauw, Fenna Achterberg, Anna Roelofs	43.95	

==== Heat 2 ====
Place	Lane	Nation	Athletes	Time	Notes
1	5	Switzerland	Géraldine Di Tizio-Frey, Ajla Del Ponte, Léonie Pointet, Salomé Kora	42.38	Q, SB
2	8	Poland	Krystsina Tsimanouskaya, Wiktoria Gajosz, Magdalena Stefanowicz, Ewa Swoboda	42.37	Q, SB
3	4	Hungary	Zita Szentgyörgyi, Boglárka Takács, Luca Kozák, Lili Hanna Brucker	42.84	Q, NR
4	3	Belgium	Rani Vincke, Rani Rosius, Janie De Naeyer, Delphine Nkansa	42.98	q, SB
5	2	Slovakia	Delia Farajpour, Viktória Korbová, Lenka Kovacovicová, Viktória Forster	44.20	
—	6	Germany	Jolina Ernst, Rebekka Haase, Sophia Junk, Gina Lückenkemper	DNF	
—	7	Greece	Apostolia Antonatou, Rafaéla Spanoudaki-Hatziriga, Dimitra Tsoukala, Polyniki Emmanouilidou	DNF	
—	9	Spain	Ericka Badeau Maseras, Jaël Bestué, Lucía Carrillo, María Isabel Pérez	DNF	

=== Final ===
The final was held on 15 August 2026, at 21:48 in the evening.

Place	Lane	Nation	Athletes	Time	Notes
1st place, gold medalist(s)	7	Great Britain & N.I.	Dina Asher-Smith, Amy Hunt, Success Eduan, Imani Lansiquot	42.05	EL
2nd place, silver medalist(s)	8	Switzerland	Géraldine Di Tizio-Frey, Fabienne Hoenke, Léonie Pointet, Salomé Kora	43.12	
3rd place, bronze medalist(s)	6	Poland	Krystsina Tsimanouskaya, Pia Skrzyszowska, Magdalena Stefanowicz, Ewa Swoboda	43.15	
4	5	Italy	Zaynab Dosso, Gloria Hooper, Dalia Kaddari, Alessia Pavese	43.21	
5	3	Belgium	Rani Vincke, Rani Rosius, Janie De Naeyer, Delphine Nkansa	43.31	
6	9	Hungary	Zita Szentgyörgyi, Boglárka Takács, Luca Kozák, Lili Hanna Brucker	43.33	
7	2	Ireland	Lucy-May Sleeman, Ciara Neville, Sarah Leahy, Lauren Roy	44.18	
—	4	Portugal	Lorène Dorcas Bazolo, Tatjana Pinto, Beatriz Castelhano, Arialis Gandulla	DNF	
