= Athletics at the 2025 Summer World University Games – Women's 200 metres =

Women's 200 metres at the 2025 Summer World University Games
- Venue: Lohrheidestadion
- Location: Bochum, Germany
- Dates: 23 July (heats); 24 July (semi-finals & final)
- Competitors: 42 from 29 nations
- Winning time: 22.79 PB

Medalists
| gold medal | Vittoria Fontana | Italy |
| silver medal | Léonie Pointet | Switzerland |
| bronze medal | Esperança Cladera | Spain |

The women's 200 metres event at the 2025 Summer World University Games was held in Bochum, Germany, at Lohrheidestadion on 23 and 24 July.

== Records ==
Prior to the competition, the records were as follows:

| Record | Athlete (nation) | Time (s) | Location | Date |
|---|---|---|---|---|
| Games record | Marita Koch (GDR) | 21.91 | Mexico City, Mexico | 12 September 1979 |

== Results ==
=== Heats ===
First 3 in each heat (Q) and the next 6 fastest (q) qualified for the semi-finals.

==== Heat 1 ====
| Place | Athlete | Nation | Time | Notes |
|---|---|---|---|---|
| 1 | Iris Caligiuri | Switzerland | 23.28 | Q |
| 2 | Vittoria Fontana | Italy | 23.50 | Q |
| 3 | Viktória Strýčková | Slovakia | 23.67 | Q |
| 4 | Simay Özçiftçi | Turkey | 23.98 | q |
| 5 | Maja Medic | Norway | 24.54 | |
| 6 | Sonia | India | 24.84 | |
| 7 | Evelīna Krakope | Latvia | 25.98 | PB |
| 8 | Sang Lida | Cambodia | 26.19 | |
| | | | Wind: (+0.1 m/s) | |

==== Heat 2 ====
| Place | Athlete | Nation | Time | Notes |
|---|---|---|---|---|
| 1 | Dalia Kaddari | Italy | 23.36 | Q |
| 2 | Anestayshia George | South Africa | 23.94 | Q |
| 3 | Inga Kanicka | Poland | 23.95 | Q |
| 4 | Marielle Venida | New Zealand | 24.03 | q |
| 5 | Charity Atiang | Uganda | 25.34 | |
| | | | Wind: (+0.2 m/s) | |

==== Heat 3 ====
| Place | Athlete | Nation | Time | Notes |
|---|---|---|---|---|
| 1 | Brooke Ironside | Great Britain | 23.33 | Q, SB |
| 2 | Emma Tainio | Finland | 23.64 | Q, PB |
| 3 | Jessica Milat | Australia | 23.65 | Q |
| 4 | Angel Silvia | India | 24.01 | q |
| 5 | Gabriella Marais | South Africa | 24.14 | q |
| 6 | Joseline Carrasco | Mexico | 25.25 | |
| 7 | Reem Sulaiman al Amri | Oman | 28.04 | |
| | | | Wind: (+0.5 m/s) | |

==== Heat 4 ====
| Place | Athlete | Nation | Time | Notes |
|---|---|---|---|---|
| 1 | Esperança Cladera | Spain | 23.54 | Q |
| 2 | Sila Koloğlu | Turkey | 23.83 | Q |
| 3 | Maria Mihalache | Romania | 24.19 | Q |
| 4 | Jennifer Eduwu | Great Britain | 24.45 | q |
| 5 | Júlia Fodor | Hungary | 24.56 | SB |
| 6 | Antonia Ramírez | Chile | 24.98 | |
| 7 | Doyin Ogunremi | Canada | 25.14 | |
| | | | Wind: (−0.3 m/s) | |

==== Heat 5 ====
| Place | Athlete | Nation | Time | Notes |
|---|---|---|---|---|
| 1 | Léonie Pointet | Switzerland | 23.45 | Q |
| 2 | Nikola Horowska | Poland | 23.98 | Q |
| 3 | Georgia Oland | Canada | 24.23 | Q |
| 4 | Lenka Kovačovicová | Slovakia | 24.27 | q |
| 5 | Bridget Mbwali | Uganda | 25.40 | |
| 6 | Sara Mia Belič | Slovenia | 25.45 | |
| 7 | Farida Rzayeva | Azerbaijan | 26.62 | |
| 8 | Paula Zaret Tinoco | Ecuador | 27.33 | |
| | | | Wind: (−0.6 m/s) | |

==== Heat 6 ====
| Place | Athlete | Nation | Time | Notes |
|---|---|---|---|---|
| 1 | Kristie Edwards | Australia | 23.31 | Q |
| 2 | Lauren Roy | Ireland | 23.57 | Q |
| 3 | Malin Furuhaug | Norway | 23.99 | Q |
| 4 | Alexandra Zalyubovskaya | Kazakhstan | 24.23 | q |
| 5 | Jordyn Blake | New Zealand | 24.66 | |
| 6 | Nimansha Herath | Sri Lanka | 25.19 | |
| 7 | Christine Kabwe | Zambia | 27.49 | |
| | | | Wind: (+0.8 m/s) | |

=== Semi-finals ===
First 2 in each heat (Q) and the next 2 fastest (q) qualified for the final.

==== Heat 1 ====
| Place | Athlete | Nation | Time | Notes |
|---|---|---|---|---|
| 1 | Vittoria Fontana | Italy | 23.22 | Q |
| 2 | Esperança Cladera | Spain | 23.29 | Q |
| 3 | Iris Caligiuri | Switzerland | 23.55 | q |
| 4 | Jessica Milat | Australia | 23.97 | |
| 5 | Georgia Oland | Canada | 24.16 | |
| 6 | Nikola Horowska | Poland | 24.18 | |
| 7 | Simay Özçiftçi | Turkey | 24.32 | |
| 8 | Lenka Kovačovicová | Slovakia | 24.37 | |
| | | | Wind: (−1.4 m/s) | |

==== Heat 2 ====
| Place | Athlete | Nation | Time | Notes |
|---|---|---|---|---|
| 1 | Dalia Kaddari | Italy | 23.38 | Q |
| 2 | Brooke Ironside | Great Britain | 23.80 | Q |
| 3 | Sila Koloğlu | Turkey | 23.85 | q |
| 4 | Inga Kanicka | Poland | 24.11 | |
| 5 | Emma Tainio | Finland | 24.21 | |
| 6 | Marielle Venida | New Zealand | 24.23 | |
| 7 | Gabriella Marais | South Africa | 24.53 | |
| | | | Wind: (−1.5 m/s) | |

==== Heat 3 ====
| Place | Athlete | Nation | Time | Notes |
|---|---|---|---|---|
| 1 | Léonie Pointet | Switzerland | 23.41 | Q |
| 2 | Kristie Edwards | Australia | 23.48 | Q |
| 3 | Viktória Strýčková | Slovakia | 23.93 | |
| 4 | Lauren Roy | Ireland | 24.07 | |
| 5 | Anestayshia George | South Africa | 24.31 | |
| 6 | Angel Silvia | India | 24.56 | |
| 7 | Maria Mihalache | Romania | 24.57 | |
| 8 | Alexandra Zalyubovskaya | Kazakhstan | 24.92 | |
| | | | Wind: (−2.5 m/s) | |

=== Final ===
| Place | Athlete | Nation | Time | Notes |
|---|---|---|---|---|
| 1st place, gold medalist(s) | Vittoria Fontana | Italy | 22.79 | PB |
| 2nd place, silver medalist(s) | Léonie Pointet | Switzerland | 22.81 | SB |
| 3rd place, bronze medalist(s) | Esperança Cladera | Spain | 23.03 | |
| 4 | Dalia Kaddari | Italy | 23.04 | |
| 5 | Kristie Edwards | Australia | 23.07 | |
| 6 | Iris Caligiuri | Switzerland | 23.27 | |
| 7 | Brooke Ironside | Great Britain | 23.57 | |
| 8 | Sila Koloğlu | Turkey | 23.65 | |
| | | | Wind: (+0.1 m/s) | |
