= 2018 IAAF World U20 Championships – Women's 100 metres =

Women's 100 metres at the 2018 World U20 Championships
- Venue: Ratina Stadium
- Dates: 11 and 12 July
- Competitors: 39 from 30 nations
- Winning time: 11.16

Medalists
gold medal	Briana Williams	Jamaica
silver medal	Twanisha Terry	United States
bronze medal	Kristal Awuah	Great Britain

The women's 100 metres at the 2018 IAAF World U20 Championships was held at Ratina Stadium on 11 and 12 July.

== Records ==
Standing records prior to the 2018 IAAF World U20 Championships in Athletics
World Junior Record	Marlies Göhr (GDR)	10.88	Dresden, East Germany	1 July 1977
Championship Record	Candace Hill (USA)	11.07	Bydgoszcz, Poland	21 July 2016
World Junior Leading	Twanisha Terry (USA)	10.99	Torrance, California, United States	21 April 2018

== Results ==
=== Heats ===
Qualification: First 4 of each heat (Q) and the 4 fastest times (q) qualified for the semifinals.

Wind:
Heat 1: +0.8 m/s, Heat 2: +0.4 m/s, Heat 3: +1.9 m/s, Heat 4: +1.8 m/s, Heat 5: +0.2 m/s

Rank	Heat	Name	Nationality	Time	Note
1	3	Briana Williams	Jamaica	11.28	Q
2	4	Kristal Awuah	Great Britain	11.35	Q, PB
3	2	Twanisha Terry	United States	11.37	Q
4	1	Keshia Beverly Kwadwo	Germany	11.43	Q
5	5	Daija Lampkin	United States	11.44	Q
6	1	Magdalena Stefanowicz	Poland	11.50	Q, PB
7	3	Lorraine Martins	Brazil	11.52	Q
8	4	Ciara Neville	Ireland	11.54	Q, SB
9	1	Jenea Spinks	Trinidad and Tobago	11.58	Q
10	5	Gina Akpe-Moses	Ireland	11.58	Q
11	1	Patrizia Van Der Weken	Luxembourg	11.62	Q
12	2	Marina-Andreea Baboi	Romania	11.64	Q
13	3	Patricia Urquía	Spain	11.66	Q, PB
14	3	Akilah Lewis	Trinidad and Tobago	11.67	Q
15	4	Ockera Myrie	Jamaica	11.70	Q
16	4	Anahí Suarez	Ecuador	11.70	Q, PB
17	5	Jaida Knowles	Bahamas	11.71	Q
18	3	Deondra Green	Canada	11.73	q
19	4	Amasha De Silva	Sri Lanka	11.75	q
20	5	Margherita Zuecco	Italy	11.75	Q
21	3	Lulu Feng	China	11.77	q
22	5	Denise Uphoff	Germany	11.77	q
23	2	Riley Day	Australia	11.77	Q
24	1	Mia Gross	Australia	11.80	
25	2	Sara Francis	Finland	11.83	Q
26	3	Soniya Jones	Netherlands Antilles	11.83	
27	1	Guillermina Cossio	Argentina	11.83	
28	2	Alessia Carpinteri	Italy	11.85	
29	2	Tiana Ósk Whitworth	Iceland	11.87	
30	5	Boglárka Takács	Hungary	11.88	
31	2	Judith Goll	Switzerland	11.93	
32	4	Gabriela Mourão	Brazil	11.98	
33	1	Lucy Sheat	New Zealand	12.10	
34	4	Suwilanji Theresa Mpondela	Zambia	12.38	
35	4	Jana Mitovska	North Macedonia	12.45	SB
36	1	Laura Bevington	Gibraltar	12.74	NJR
37	5	Marie-Charlotte Gastaud	Monaco	13.31	SB
	5	Klaudia Adamek	Poland	DNF	
	3	Fatmata Koroma	Sierra Leone	DNS	

=== Semifinals ===
Qualification: First 2 of each heat (Q) and the 2 fastest times (q) qualified for the final.

Wind:
Heat 1: +0.4 m/s, Heat 2: -0.2 m/s, Heat 3: +0.3 m/s

Rank	Heat	Name	Nationality	Time	Note
1	1	Twanisha Terry	United States	11.03	Q, CR
2	2	Briana Williams	Jamaica	11.25	Q
3	3	Kristal Awuah	Great Britain	11.37	Q
4	1	Keshia Beverly Kwadwo	Germany	11.39	Q
5	1	Gina Akpe-Moses	Ireland	11.51	q
6	3	Daija Lampkin	United States	11.55	Q
7	2	Magdalena Stefanowicz	Poland	11.56	Q
8	2	Lorraine Martins	Brazil	11.57	q
9	3	Jenea Spinks	Trinidad and Tobago	11.62	
10	1	Deondra Green	Canada	11.63	SB
11	2	Akilah Lewis	Trinidad and Tobago	11.65	
12	1	Riley Day	Australia	11.67	
13	3	Ockera Myrie	Jamaica	11.69	
14	1	Marina-Andreea Baboi	Romania	11.69	
15	1	Patrizia Van Der Weken	Luxembourg	11.70	
16	3	Ciara Neville	Ireland	11.70	
17	3	Anahí Suarez	Ecuador	11.70	PB
18	3	Lulu Feng	China	11.84	
19	1	Amasha De Silva	Sri Lanka	11.86	
20	3	Sara Francis	Finland	11.87	
21	2	Margherita Zuecco	Italy	11.88	
22	2	Denise Uphoff	Germany	11.90	
23	2	Patricia Urquía	Spain	11.90	
	2	Jaida Knowles	Bahamas	DNS	

=== Final ===
Wind: +0.3 m/s

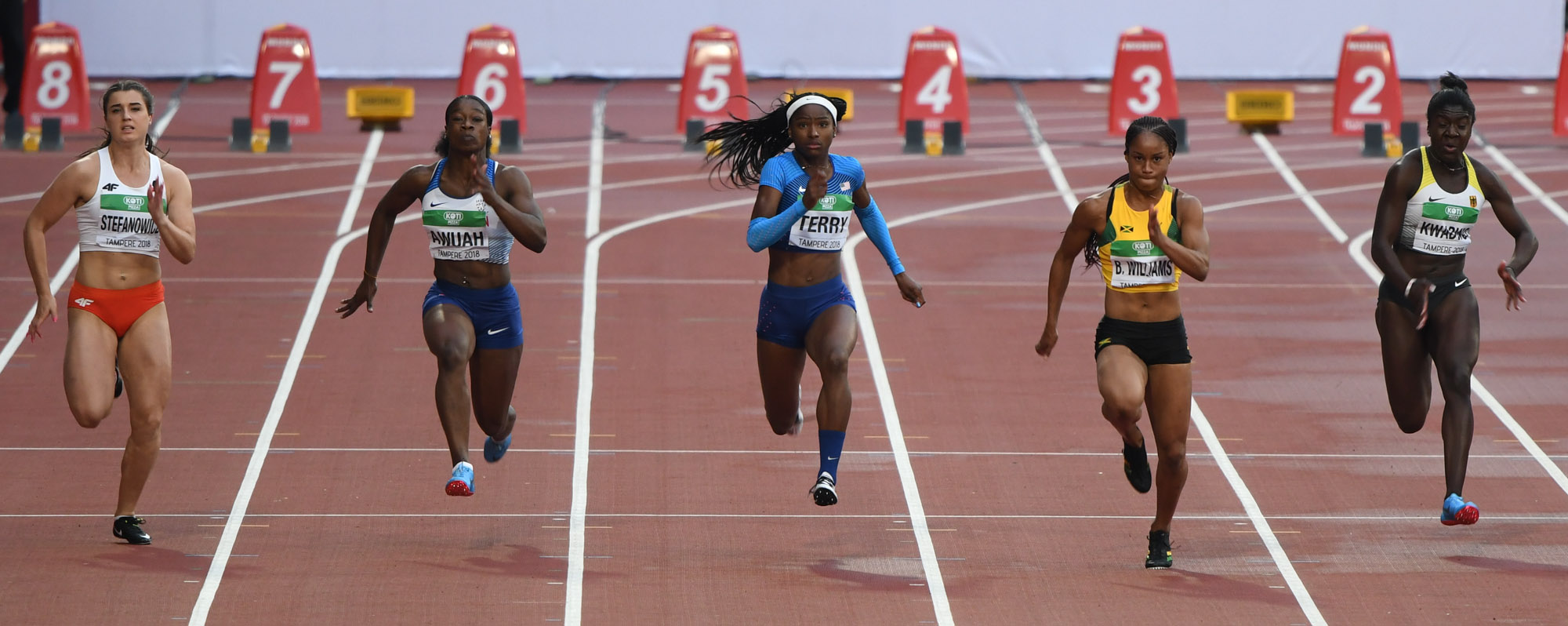
The final

Rank	Lane	Name	Nationality	Time	Note
1st place, gold medalist(s)	4	Briana Williams	Jamaica	11.16	
2nd place, silver medalist(s)	5	Twanisha Terry	United States	11.19	
3rd place, bronze medalist(s)	6	Kristal Awuah	Great Britain	11.37	
4	3	Keshia Beverly Kwadwo	Germany	11.41	
5	7	Magdalena Stefanowicz	Poland	11.47	PB
6	1	Lorraine Martins	Brazil	11.48	
7	8	Daija Lampkin	United States	11.59	
8	2	Gina Akpe-Moses	Ireland	11.64	
