= 2018 IAAF World U20 Championships – Women's 200 metres =

Women's 200 metres at the 2018 World U20 Championships
- Venue: Ratina Stadium
- Dates: 13 and 14 July
- Competitors: 34 from 25 nations
- Winning time: 22.50

Medalists
gold medal	Briana Williams	Jamaica
silver medal	Lauren Rain Williams	United States
bronze medal	Martyna Kotwiła	Poland

The women's 200 metres at the 2018 IAAF World U20 Championships was held at Ratina Stadium on 13 and 14 July.

== Records ==
Standing records prior to the 2018 IAAF World U20 Championships in Athletics
World U20 Record	Allyson Felix (USA)	22.18	Athens, Greece	25 August 2004
Championship Record	Anthonique Strachan (BAH)	22.53	Barcelona, Spain	13 July 2012
World U20 Leading	Sydney McLaughlin (USA)	22.39	Gainesville, United States	29 March 2018

== Results ==
=== Heats ===
Qualification: First 4 of each heat (Q) and the 4 fastest times (q) qualified for the semifinals.

Wind:
Heat 1: -0.1 m/s, Heat 2: +1.1 m/s, Heat 3: +0.9 m/s, Heat 4: +0.2 m/s, Heat 5: +0.7 m/s

Rank	Heat	Name	Nationality	Time	Note
1	4	Lauren Rain Williams	United States	22.98	Q
2	5	Polina Miller	Authorised Neutral Athletes	23.17	Q
3	5	Martyna Kotwiła	Poland	23.21	Q, NJR
4	3	Briana Williams	Jamaica	23.32	Q
5	5	Akvilė Andriukaitytė	Lithuania	23.35	Q, NJR
6	1	Jayla Kirkland	United States	23.41	Q
7	1	Sophia Junk	Germany	23.43	Q
8	2	Alisha Rees	Great Britain	23.49	Q
9	3	Corinna Schwab	Germany	23.55	Q, PB
10	2	Ashlan Best	Canada	23.62	Q, SB
11	4	Georgina Adam	Great Britain	23.69	Q
12	4	Jaël Bestué	Spain	23.70	Q
13	3	Lorraine Martins	Brazil	23.75	Q
14	3	Mia Gross	Australia	23.78	Q
15	5	Shuri Aono	Japan	23.93	Q
16	2	Riley Day	Australia	24.00	Q
17	4	Ciara Neville	Ireland	24.01	Q
18	1	Anahí Suárez	Ecuador	24.01	Q
19	4	Catarina Lourenço	Portugal	24.03	q, PB
20	1	Leticia Lima	Brazil	24.03	Q
21	1	Angie González	Colombia	24.13	q
22	1	Iantha Wright	Trinidad and Tobago	24.16	q
23	4	Patrizia Van Der Weken	Luxembourg	24.20	q
24	1	Sara Francis	Finland	24.23	PB
25	5	Sanda Colomeiteva	Cyprus	24.25	
26	5	Aurora Berton	Italy	24.29	
27	2	Moillet Kouakou	Italy	24.32	Q
28	3	Lucy Sheat	New Zealand	24.52	
29	3	Gayane Chiloyan	Armenia	24.52	SB
30	2	Kayvon Stubbs	Bahamas	24.61	
31	3	Lauren Gale	Canada	24.78	
	4	Jaida Knowles	Bahamas	DNS	
	2	Akilah Lewis	Trinidad and Tobago	DNS	
	2	Halutie Hor	Ghana	DNS	

=== Semifinals ===
Qualification: First 2 of each heat (Q) and the 2 fastest times (q) qualified for the final.

Wind:
Heat 1: -0.5 m/s, Heat 2: -0.1 m/s, Heat 3: +0.2 m/s

Rank	Heat	Name	Nationality	Time	Note
1	2	Lauren Rain Williams	United States	23.15	Q
2	3	Briana Williams	Jamaica	23.41	Q
3	2	Martyna Kotwiła	Poland	23.42	Q
4	1	Polina Miller	Authorised Neutral Athletes	23.44	Q
5	2	Sophia Junk	Germany	23.46	q
6	3	Jayla Kirkland	United States	23.54	Q
7	1	Corinna Schwab	Germany	23.57	Q
8	2	Lorraine Martins	Brazil	23.64	q
9	1	Alisha Rees	Great Britain	23.67	
10	3	Ashlan Best	Canada	23.67	
11	2	Jaël Bestué	Spain	23.68	
12	3	Mia Gross	Australia	23.86	
13	3	Anahí Suárez	Ecuador	24.09	
14	3	Georgina Adam	Great Britain	24.37	
15	1	Iantha Wright	Trinidad and Tobago	24.41	
16	3	Catarina Lourenço	Portugal	24.46	
17	3	Angie González	Colombia	24.46	
18	2	Patrizia Van Der Weken	Luxembourg	24.58	
19	1	Shuri Aono	Japan	24.60	
20	2	Moillet Kouakou	Italy	24.61	
21	1	Leticia Lima	Brazil	24.64	
22	2	Ciara Neville	Ireland	24.68	
23	1	Akvilė Andriukaitytė	Lithuania	25.23	
	1	Riley Day	Australia	DNS	

=== Final ===
Wind: -0.1 m/s

Rank	Lane	Name	Nationality	Time	Note
1st place, gold medalist(s)	3	Briana Williams	Jamaica	22.50	CR
2nd place, silver medalist(s)	5	Lauren Rain Williams	United States	23.09	
3rd place, bronze medalist(s)	4	Martyna Kotwiła	Poland	23.21	NJR
4	6	Polina Miller	Authorised Neutral Athletes	23.32	
5	1	Sophia Junk	Germany	23.55	
6	7	Corinna Schwab	Germany	23.55	PB
7	2	Lorraine Martins	Brazil	23.91	
	8	Jayla Kirkland	United States	DQ	
