= 2026 European Athletics Championships – Women's 200 metres =

Women's 200 metres at the 2026 European Athletics Championships
- Venue: Alexander Stadium
- Location: Birmingham, United Kingdom
- Dates: 12 August 2026 (round 1 & semi-finals); 13 August 2026 (final)
- Competitors: 36 (target)
- Winning time: 22.19

Medalists
gold medal	Amy Hunt	Great Britain
silver medal	Rhasidat Adeleke	Ireland
bronze medal	Dina Asher-Smith	Great Britain

Official Video Highlights

The women's 200 metres at the 2026 European Athletics Championships took place over three rounds at the Alexander Stadium in Birmingham, United Kingdom, on 12 and 13 August 2026.

== Background ==
Records before the 2026 European Athletics Championships
Record	Athlete (nation)	Time	Location	Date
World record	Florence Griffith-Joyner (USA)	21.34	Seoul, South-Korea	29 September 1988
European record	Dafne Schippers (NED)	21.63	Beijing, China	28 August 2015
Championship record	Heike Drechsler (GDR)	21.71	Stuttgart, West-Germany	29 August 1986
World leading	Julien Alfred (LCA)	21.51	Fontvieille, Monaco	10 July 2026
European leading	Dina Asher-Smith (GBR)	22.28	London, United Kingdom	18 July 2026

== Qualification ==
For the women's 200 metres, the qualification period was from 27 July 2025 to 26 July 2026. Athletes qualified by running the entry standard of 22.85 or faster, by wildcard for the 2024 European Athletics Champion, or by their position on the World Athletics Rankings for the event. The target number was 36 athletes.

Qualification standings per 31 July 2026
QP	CP	Country	Athlete	PB	SB	Qualification method	Details
1	1	Switzerland	Mujinga Kambundji	22.05	23.37	Qualified by Wild Card	Defending European Champion
2	1	Great Britain & N.I.	Amy Hunt	22.08	22.30	Qualified by Entry Standard	22.08 - National Stadium, Tokyo (JPN) - 18 SEP 2025
3	2	Great Britain & N.I.	Dina Asher-Smith	21.88	22.28	Qualified by Entry Standard	22.14 - Alexander Stadium, Birmingham (GBR) - 03 AUG 2025
4	3	Great Britain & N.I.	Success Eduan	22.43	22.43	Qualified by Entry Standard	22.43 - Alexander Stadium, Birmingham (GBR) - 21 JUN 2026
5	1	Spain	Jaël Bestué	22.19	22.57	Qualified by Entry Standard	22.46 - Estadi Natalia Rodríguez, Tarragona (ESP) - 03 AUG 2025
6	2	Switzerland	Fabienne Hoenke	22.50	22.50	Qualified by Entry Standard	22.50 - Stade Louis II, Monaco (MON) - 10 JUL 2026
reserve	4	Great Britain & N.I.	Kristal Ama-Awuah	22.57	22.57	Qualified by Entry Standard	22.57 - London Marathon Community Track, London (GBR) - 12 JUL 2026
7	1	France	Gémima Joseph	22.57	22.60	Qualified by Entry Standard	22.60 - Ray Conn Sports Complex, Cleveland, TN (USA) - 29 MAY 2026
8	3	Switzerland	Léonie Pointet	22.69	22.69	Qualified by Entry Standard	22.69 - Stadion Trinermatten, Zofingen (SUI) - 23 MAY 2026
9	1	Germany	Sophia Junk	22.53	22.76	Qualified by Entry Standard	22.71 - National Stadium, Tokyo (JPN) - 18 SEP 2025
10	2	Germany	Judith Bilepo Mokobe	22.78	22.78	Qualified by Entry Standard	22.78 - Lohrheidestadion, Wattenscheid, Bochum (GER) - 26 JUL 2026
11	2	Spain	Esperança Cladera	22.79	22.93	Qualified by Entry Standard	22.79 - Estadi Natalia Rodríguez, Tarragona (ESP) - 03 AUG 2025
12	1	Ireland	Rhasidat Adeleke	22.34	22.80	Qualified by Entry Standard	22.80 - Morton Stadium, Santry, Dublin (IRL) - 25 JUL 2026
13	2	Ireland	Lauren Roy	22.83	22.83	Qualified by Entry Standard	22.83 - John McDonnell Field, Fayetteville, AR (USA) - 30 MAY 2026
14	1	Greece	Polyniki Emmanouilidou	22.84	23.22	Qualified by World Rankings	12th - 1194 points
15	3	Germany	Jessica-Bianca Wessolly	22.50	22.92	Qualified by World Rankings	17th - 1180 points
reserve	4	Germany	Talea Prepens	22.83	22.86	Qualified by World Rankings	18th - 1177 points
16	1	Cyprus	Olivia Fotopoulou	22.65	23.07	Qualified by World Rankings	19th - 1177 points
17	1	Belgium	Delphine Nkansa	22.88	23.26	Qualified by World Rankings	20th - 1174 points
18	1	Italy	Vittoria Fontana	22.79	23.03	Qualified by World Rankings	24th - 1164 points
19	1	Hungary	Boglárka Takács	22.65	23.02	Qualified by World Rankings	25th - 1164 points
20	1	Turkey	Sila Koloğlu	23.09	23.09	Qualified by World Rankings	26th - 1163 points
21	3	Spain	Alba Borrero	22.97	22.97	Qualified by World Rankings	27th - 1163 points
22	2	Italy	Dalia Kaddari	22.64	23.19	Qualified by World Rankings	28th - 1162 points
23	4	Switzerland	Iris Caligiuri	23.02	23.25	Qualified by World Rankings	29th - 1159 points
24	2	Greece	Rafailia Spanoudaki-Chatziriga	23.04	23.38	Qualified by World Rankings	30th - 1158 points
25	3	Italy	Gloria Hooper	22.89	23.10	Qualified by World Rankings	31st - 1157 points
26	1	Estonia	Ann Marii Kivikas	23.04	23.22	Qualified by World Rankings	36th - 1150 points
27	1	Poland	Wiktoria Gajosz	22.91	22.91	Qualified by World Rankings	37th - 1149 points
28	1	Slovenia	Zala Istenič	22.97	22.97	Qualified by World Rankings	38th - 1149 points
29	1	Slovakia	Viktória Korbová	23.25	23.25	Qualified by World Rankings	42nd - 1141 points
reserve	5	Germany	Holly Okuku	22.85	22.87	Qualified by World Rankings	46th - 1138 points
30	1	Lithuania	Lukrecija Sabaitytė	23.11	23.44	Qualified by World Rankings	52nd - 1137 points
reserve	4	Italy	Elena Cambiolo	23.05	23.05	Qualified by World Rankings	56th - 1135 points
31	2	Turkey	Elif Polat	23.16	23.19	Qualified by World Rankings	57th - 1133 points
32	3	Greece	Dimitra Tsoukala	22.97	23.56	Qualified by World Rankings	58th - 1133 points
33	1	Norway	Maren Bakke Amundsen	23.45	23.45	Qualified by World Rankings	64th - 1124 points
34	2	Slovenia	Lina Hribar	23.29	23.29	Qualified by World Rankings	76th - 1116 points
35	1	Sweden	Wilma Svenson	23.30	23.30	Qualified by World Rankings	79th - 1114 points
reserve	5	Italy	Ginevra Ricci	23.24	23.24	Qualified by World Rankings	81st - 1114 points
36	1	Bulgaria	Kristen Radukanova	23.55	23.55	Qualified by World Rankings	91st - 1104 points
reserve	3	Ireland	Sophie Becker	22.83	22.83	Next best by World Rankings	95th - 1100 points

Bye to semi-finals	Reserve activated	Withdrawal / reserve unused

== Schedule ==
Date	Time	Round
12 August 2026	11:40	Round 1
12 August 2026	20:20	Semi-finals
13 August 2026	21:50	Final

All times are local times (UTC+1)

== Results ==
=== Round 1 ===
Round 1 was held on 12 August 2026, at 11:40 in the morning. 12 best performers (q) advance to the semi-finals.

==== Heat 1 ====
Place	Lane	Athlete	Nation	Time	Notes
1	6	Boglárka Takács	Hungary	22.84	q, SB
2	8	Polyniki Emmanouilidou	Greece	23.15	q, SB
3	3	Ann Marii Kivikas	Estonia	23.16	q, SB
4	9	Lauren Roy	Ireland	23.20	q
5	4	Vittoria Fontana	Italy	23.23	q
6	7	Maren Bakke Amundsen	Norway	23.50	
7	5	Lina Hribar	Slovenia	23.74	
				Wind: (−0.9 m/s)	

==== Heat 2 ====
Place	Lane	Athlete	Nation	Time	Notes
1	9	Talea Prepens	Germany	23.16	q
2	5	Wilma Svenson	Sweden	23.30	q, =PB
3	3	Elena Cambiolo	Italy	23.35	q
4	8	Iris Caligiuri	Switzerland	23.39	q
5	2	Elif Polat	Turkey	23.43	
6	7	Lukrecija Sabaitytė	Lithuania	23.62	
7	4	Dimitra Tsoukala	Greece	23.77	
	6	Zala Istenič	Slovenia	DNS	
				Wind: (−0.4 m/s)	

==== Heat 3 ====
Place	Lane	Athlete	Nation	Time	Notes
1	7	Dalia Kaddari	Italy	23.14	q, SB
2	5	Alba Borrero	Spain	23.35	q
3	3	Rafailia Spanoudaki-Chatziriga	Greece	23.37	q, SB
4	6	Delphine Nkansa	Belgium	23.41	
5	4	Wiktoria Gajosz	Poland	23.44	
6	8	Viktória Korbová	Slovakia	23.51	
7	9	Sila Koloğlu	Turkey	23.65	
8	2	Kristen Radukanova	Bulgaria	24.18	
				Wind: (+ m/s)	

=== Semi-finals ===
The semi-finals were held on 12 August 2026, at 20:20 in the evening. First 2 in each heat (Q) and the next 2 fastest (q) advanced to the final.

==== Heat 1 ====
Place	Lane	Athlete	Nation	Time	Notes
1	7	Dina Asher-Smith	Great Britain & N.I.	22.49	Q
2	6	Gémima Joseph	France	22.68	Q
3	9	Dalia Kaddari	Italy	22.96	SB
4	2	Polyniki Emmanouilidou	Greece	23.06	SB
5	8	Léonie Pointet	Switzerland	23.10	
6	4	Talea Prepens	Germany	23.32	
7	3	Mujinga Kambundji	Switzerland	23.81	
8	5	Esperança Cladera	Spain	36.10	
				Wind: (±0.0 m/s)	

==== Heat 2 ====
Place	Lane	Athlete	Nation	Time	Notes
1	8	Amy Hunt	Great Britain & N.I.	22.37	Q
2	6	Jaël Bestué	Spain	22.69	Q
3	9	Boglárka Takács	Hungary	22.77	q, SB
4	4	Lauren Roy	Ireland	23.16	
5	7	Sophia Junk	Germany	23.22	
6	3	Ann Marii Kivikas	Estonia	23.34	
7	2	Rafailia Spanoudaki-Chatziriga	Greece	23.45	
8	5	Elena Cambiolo	Italy	23.70	
				Wind: (−0.1 m/s)	

==== Heat 3 ====
Place	Lane	Athlete	Nation	Time	Notes
1	4	Rhasidat Adeleke	Ireland	22.43	Q, SB
2	8	Fabienne Hoenke	Switzerland	22.46	Q, PB
3	7	Success Eduan	Great Britain & N.I.	22.56	q
4	6	Judith Bilepo Mokobe	Germany	23.24	
5	5	Vittoria Fontana	Italy	23.25	
6	2	Wilma Svenson	Sweden	23.30	=PB
7	9	Alba Borrero	Spain	23.32	
8	3	Iris Caligiuri	Switzerland	23.34	
				Wind: (±0 m/s)	

=== Final ===
The final was held on 13 August 2026, at 21:50 in the evening.

Place	Lane	Athlete	Nation	Time	Notes
1st place, gold medalist(s)	7	Amy Hunt	Great Britain & N.I.	22.19	EL
2nd place, silver medalist(s)	6	Rhasidat Adeleke	Ireland	22.28	NR
3rd place, bronze medalist(s)	8	Dina Asher-Smith	Great Britain & N.I.	22.29	
4	9	Fabienne Hoenke	Switzerland	22.55	
5	4	Gémima Joseph	France	22.63	
6	3	Success Eduan	Great Britain & N.I.	22.66	
7	5	Jaël Bestué	Spain	22.69	
8	2	Boglárka Takács	Hungary	22.82	
				Wind: (+0.7 m/s)	
