= 2023 European Athletics U23 Championships – Women's 200 metres =

Women's 200 metres at the 2023 European Athletics U23 Championships
- Venue: Leppävaara Stadium
- Location: Espoo, Finland
- Dates: 15 July (heats & semi-finals); 16 July (final)
- Competitors: 28 from 22 nations
- Winning time: 23.31

Medalists
gold medal	Delphine Nkansa	Belgium
silver medal	Boglárka Takács	Hungary
bronze medal	Polyniki Emmanouilidou	Greece

The women's 200 metres event at the 2023 European Athletics U23 Championships was held in Espoo, Finland, at Leppävaara Stadium on 15 and 16 July.

== Records ==
Prior to the competition, the records were as follows:

European U23 record	Marita Koch (GDR)	21.71	Karl Marx Stadt, East Germany	10 June 1979
Championship U23 record	Hana Benešová (SVK)	22.57	Turku, Finland	13 July 1997

== Results ==
=== Heats ===
First 3 in each heat (Q) and the next 4 fastest (q) qualified for the semi-finals.

==== Heat 1 ====
Place	Athlete	Nation	Time	Notes
1	Nikola Horowska	Poland	22.99	Q
2	Talea Prepens	Germany	23.17	Q
3	Polyniki Emmanouilidou	Greece	23.37	Q
4	Anna Pursiainen	Finland	23.87	
5	Wilma Svenson	Sweden	24.15	
6	Iris Caligiuri	Switzerland	24.19	
7	Pavla Kvasničková	Czech Republic	24.20	
			Wind: (+2.4 m/s)	

==== Heat 2 ====
Place	Athlete	Nation	Time	Notes
1	Gémima Joseph	France	23.25	Q
2	Delphine Nkansa	Belgium	23.46	Q
3	Lucía Carrillo	Spain	23.50	Q
4	Lukrecija Sabaityté	Lithuania	23.84	q
5	Barbora Šplechtnová	Czech Republic	23.92	
6	Maren Bakke Amundsen	Norway	23.96	
7	Guðbjörg Jóna Bjarnadóttir	Iceland	24.19	
			Wind: (+0.7 m/s)	

==== Heat 3 ====
Place	Athlete	Nation	Time	Notes
1	Dalia Kaddari	Italy	23.00	Q, SB
2	Paméra Losange	France	23.23	Q
3	Léonie Pointet	Switzerland	23.48	Q
4	Ivana Ilic	Serbia	23.70	q
5	Veronika Drljacic	Croatia	23.80	q
6	Simay Özçiftçi	Turkey	23.89	
7	Lenka Kovačovicová	Slovakia	24.35	
			Wind: (+2.0 m/s)	

==== Heat 4 ====
Place	Athlete	Nation	Time	Notes
1	Monika Romaszko	Poland	23.33	Q
2	Ann Marii Kivikas	Estonia	23.47	Q, PB
3	Boglárka Takács	Hungary	23.50	Q
4	Natálie Kožuškaničová	Czech Republic	23.74	q
5	Tamara Milutinovic	Serbia	23.95	
6	Maria Bisericescu	Romania	24.02	
7	Carla Scicluna	Malta	24.23	
			Wind: (+1.1 m/s)	

=== Semi-finals ===
First 3 in each heat (Q) and the next 2 fastest (q) qualified for the final.

==== Heat 1 ====
Place	Athlete	Nation	Time	Notes
1	Dalia Kaddari	Italy	23.77	Q
2	Delphine Nkansa	Belgium	23.93	Q
3	Monika Romaszko	Poland	23.95	Q
4	Léonie Pointet	Switzerland	24.05	
5	Lucía Carrillo	Spain	24.21	
6	Veronika Drljacic	Croatia	24.50	
7	Natálie Kožuškaničová	Czech Republic	24.51	
—	Gémima Joseph	France	DNS	
			Wind: (±0.0 m/s)	

==== Heat 2 ====
Place	Athlete	Nation	Time	Notes
1	Talea Prepens	Germany	23.51	Q
2	Polyniki Emmanouilidou	Greece	23.61	Q
3	Nikola Horowska	Poland	23.65	Q
4	Boglárka Takács	Hungary	23.69	q
5	Paméra Losange	France	23.82	q
6	Ann Marii Kivikas	Estonia	24.12	
7	Lukrecija Sabaityté	Lithuania	24.40	
8	Ivana Ilic	Serbia	24.42	
			Wind: (−3.6 m/s)	

=== Final ===
Place	Lane	Athlete	Nation	Time	Notes
1st place, gold medalist(s)	4	Delphine Nkansa	Belgium	23.31	
2nd place, silver medalist(s)	1	Boglárka Takács	Hungary	23.33	
3rd place, bronze medalist(s)	7	Polyniki Emmanouilidou	Greece	23.41	
4	6	Talea Prepens	Germany	23.52	
5	5	Dalia Kaddari	Italy	23.52	
6	3	Nikola Horowska	Poland	23.53	
7	8	Monika Romaszko	Poland	23.77	
8	2	Paméra Losange	France	23.90	
				Wind: (−0.1 m/s)	
