= Molly Scott (athlete) =

Irish sprinter

Personal information
- Born: 29 August 1999 (age 27) Carlow, Ireland

Sport
- Country: Ireland
- Sport: Athletics
- Events: 60m, 60m hurdles, 100m, 100m hurdles

Achievements and titles
- Personal bests: 100 m: 11.47 (Tallinn 2021) 100m hurdles 13.59 (Gävle, 2019); Indoors; 60 m: 7.19 (Abbotstown 2022) 60m hurdles 8.31 (Dublin, 2024)
Medal record
Women's athletics
Representing Ireland
World U20 Championships
| Silver medal – second place | 2018 Tampere | 4x100 m relay |
European U18 Championships
| Bronze medal – third place | 2016 Tbilisi | 100 m hurdles |

Molly Scott (born 30 March 1999) is an Irish track and field athlete. She is a multiple Irish 60m national champion as well as the national record holder over that distance. She has been called “Ireland's fastest woman”.

== Personal life ==
Molly Scott is from Carlow in south-east Ireland. She is a member of St. Laurence O'Toole Athletics Club in Carlow. Scott, since the age of 12, has been coached by her mother Deirdre. In 2021, she completed a law degree and subsequently began a barrister of law degree at King's Inns.

== Career ==
=== Junior career ===
Scott won bronze in the 100 metres hurdles at the 2016 European Athletics Youth Championships held in Tbilisi, Georgia. In 2018, she earned silver as part of the 4 × 100 m Irish team at the World U-20 Championships in Tampere, Finland.

=== Senior career ===
Scott took her first Irish national senior title in 2019 when she won the 60 m race in a time of 7.32 seconds at the National Sports Campus in Abbotstown.

On 29 January 2022, she broke the national 60 m record held by Amy Foster by running 7.23 seconds for the distance. However, Scott only initially held the record for a few days as Rhasidat Adeleke then ran 7.21 in Albuquerque that same week. On 27 February, Scott regained the national record running 7.19 and in doing so secured the win for her second Irish Indoor Athletics Championships in Abbotstown. It was the second time the final had been run that day after a technical fault had not recorded times for the first race. In February, Scott also recorded a win over 60 m European indoor champion Ajla Del Ponte at the Czech Gala in Ostrava.

Scott was named in the Ireland squad for the 2022 World Athletics Indoor Championships held in the Serbian capital Belgrade in March 2022. She qualified from the heats for the semi-final in the 60 m, before finishing 19th overall. She was named in the Irish sprint team for the outdoor 2022 World Athletics Championships held in Eugene, Oregon and the 2022 European Championships, however, that summer a tear to the posterior tibial tendon in her left ankle resulted in a long period of rehabilitation.

On 17 February 2024, she finished runner-up in a personal best time of 8.31 in the 60 metres hurdles at the Irish national indoor championships. The following day she won the 60 metres title in a time of 7.36 seconds. In June 2024, she finished second in the 100m hurdles at the Irish Athletics Championships in 13.64 seconds.

Scott was called to the Bar and practises as a barrister at the Four Courts in Dublin. She has said that combining her first year at the Bar with training was unsustainable and contributed to a period of physical burnout during the 2024–25 indoor season.

On 1 March 2026, Scott placed third in the 60 metres at the Irish Indoor Athletics Championships in 7.37 seconds finishing behind Ciara Neville and Precious Akpe-Moses, but ahead of defending champion Sarah Leahy. She was named in the Irish team for the 2026 World Athletics Relays in Botswana, and ran in the women's 4 × 100 m relay. Scott had a third-place finish in the 100 m at the Irish Championships in July 2026 and was named in the Irish sprint relay pool for the 2026 European Championships in Birmingham.
