= 2021 European Athletics U23 Championships – Women's 200 metres =

Women's 200 metres at the 2021 European Athletics U23 Championships
- Venue: Kadriorg Stadium, Tallinn
- Dates: 9–10 July
- Competitors: 32 from 22 nations
- Winning time: 22.64

Medalists
gold medal	Dalia Kaddari	Italy
silver medal	Sophia Junk	Germany
bronze medal	Gémima Joseph	France

The women's 200 metres event at the 2021 European Athletics U23 Championships was held in Tallinn, Estonia, at Kadriorg Stadium on 9 and 10 July.

== Records ==
Prior to the competition, the records were as follows:

European U23 record	Marita Koch (GER)	21.71	Karl-Marx-Stadt, East Germany	10 June 1979
Championship U23 record	Hana Benešová (CZE)	22.57	Turku, Finland	13 July 1997

== Results ==
=== Round 1 ===
Qualification rule: First 4 in each heat (Q) and the next 4 fastest (q) advance to the Semi-Finals.

Wind:
Heat 1: +0.5 m/s, Heat 2: -0.4 m/s, Heat 3: -0.4 m/s, Heat 4: -0.6 m/s, Heat 5: +0.6 m/s

Rank	Heat	Name	Nationality	Time	Notes
1	2	Gémima Joseph	France	23.13	Q
2	3	Sophia Junk	Germany	23.15	Q
3	5	Dalia Kaddari	Italy	23.24	Q
4	1	Talea Prepens	Germany	23.26	Q
5	5	Akvilė Andriukaitytė	Lithuania	23.48	Q, SB
6	4	Wided Atatou	France	23.49	Q
7	2	Marina Andreea Baboi	Romania	23.61	Q, PB
8	3	Eleonora Ricci	Italy	23.66	Q
9	2	Aurora Berton	Italy	23.70	Q
10	5	Kiah Dubarry-Gay	Great Britain	23.73	Q
11	1	Georgina Adam	Great Britain	23.80	Q
12	3	Mizgin Ay	Turkey	23.83	Q
13	2	Veronika Drljačić	Croatia	23.83	Q, PB
14	1	Wilma Rosenquist	Sweden	23.85	Q, SB
15	5	Julia Henriksson	Sweden	23.87	Q, PB
16	3	Katsiaryna Zhyvayeva	Belarus	23.88	Q, SB
17	4	Artemis Melina Anastasiou	Greece	23.90	Q
18	4	Léonie Pointet	Switzerland	23.92	Q
19	2	Viktoriya Ratnikova	Ukraine	24.02	q
20	3	Tamara Milutinović	Serbia	24.17	q
21	1	Boglárka Takács	Hungary	24.23	Q
22	4	Line Holm Jensen	Denmark	24.26	Q
23	3	Julia Polak	Poland	24.27	q
24	2	Ingvild Meinseth	Norway	24.32	q
25	5	Natálie Kožuškaničová	Czech Republic	24.32	
26	1	Štepánka Kolářová	Czech Republic	24.33	
27	2	Guðbjörg Jóna Bjarnadóttir	Iceland	24.40	
28	5	Viktoria Strýčková	Slovakia	24.51	
29	1	Olena Radiuk-Kucuk	Ukraine	24.56	
30	4	Agáta Kolingerová	Czech Republic	24.67	
31	3	Kaitesi Ertzgaard	Norway	24.69	
32	1	Beatrice Berti	San Marino	26.08	
	4	Amber Anning	Great Britain	DNS	
	5	Carla Scicluna	Malta	DNS	

=== Semifinals ===
Qualification rule: First 2 in each heat (Q) and the next 2 fastest (q) advance to the Final.

Wind:
Heat 1: -1.3 m/s, Heat 2: -1.2 m/s, Heat 3: -0.7 m/s

Rank	Heat	Name	Nationality	Time	Notes
1	1	Sophia Junk	Germany	22.92	Q, PB
2	3	Gémima Joseph	France	23.04	Q
3	2	Dalia Kaddari	Italy	23.18	Q
4	2	Talea Prepens	Germany	23.29	Q
5	1	Kiah Dubarry-Gay	Great Britain	23.29	Q, PB
6	1	Eleonora Ricci	Italy	23.37	q, PB
7	3	Marina Andreea Baboi	Romania	23.49	Q, PB
8	3	Mizgin Ay	Turkey	23.49	q, PB
9	3	Julia Henriksson	Sweden	23.55	PB
10	1	Wided Atatou	France	23.57	
11	2	Georgina Adam	Great Britain	23.57	
12	3	Akvilė Andriukaitytė	Lithuania	23.61	
13	3	Aurora Berton	Italy	23.64	
14	1	Katsiaryna Zhyvayeva	Belarus	23.66	PB
15	1	Julia Polak	Poland	23.82	
16	2	Veronika Drljačić	Croatia	23.82	PB
17	2	Léonie Pointet	Switzerland	23.97	
18	1	Wilma Rosenquist	Sweden	24.04	
19	2	Viktoriya Ratnikova	Ukraine	24.07	
20	3	Boglárka Takács	Hungary	24.13	
21	2	Tamara Milutinović	Serbia	24.18	
22	2	Artemis Melina Anastasiou	Greece	24.21	
23	3	Ingvild Meinseth	Norway	24.30	
24	1	Line Holm Jensen	Denmark	24.34	

=== Final ===
Wind: –0.4 m/s

Rank	Lane	Name	Nationality	Time	Notes
1st place, gold medalist(s)	5	Dalia Kaddari	Italy	22.64	EU23L
2nd place, silver medalist(s)	3	Sophia Junk	Germany	22.87	PB
3rd place, bronze medalist(s)	4	Gémima Joseph	France	22.97	
4	6	Talea Prepens	Germany	23.15	PB
5	8	Kiah Dubarry-Gay	Great Britain	23.32	
6	2	Eleonora Ricci	Italy	23.41	
7	7	Marina Andreea Baboi	Romania	23.48	PB
8	1	Mizgin Ay	Turkey	23.74	
