= Nikola Horowska =

Polish sprinter and long jumper

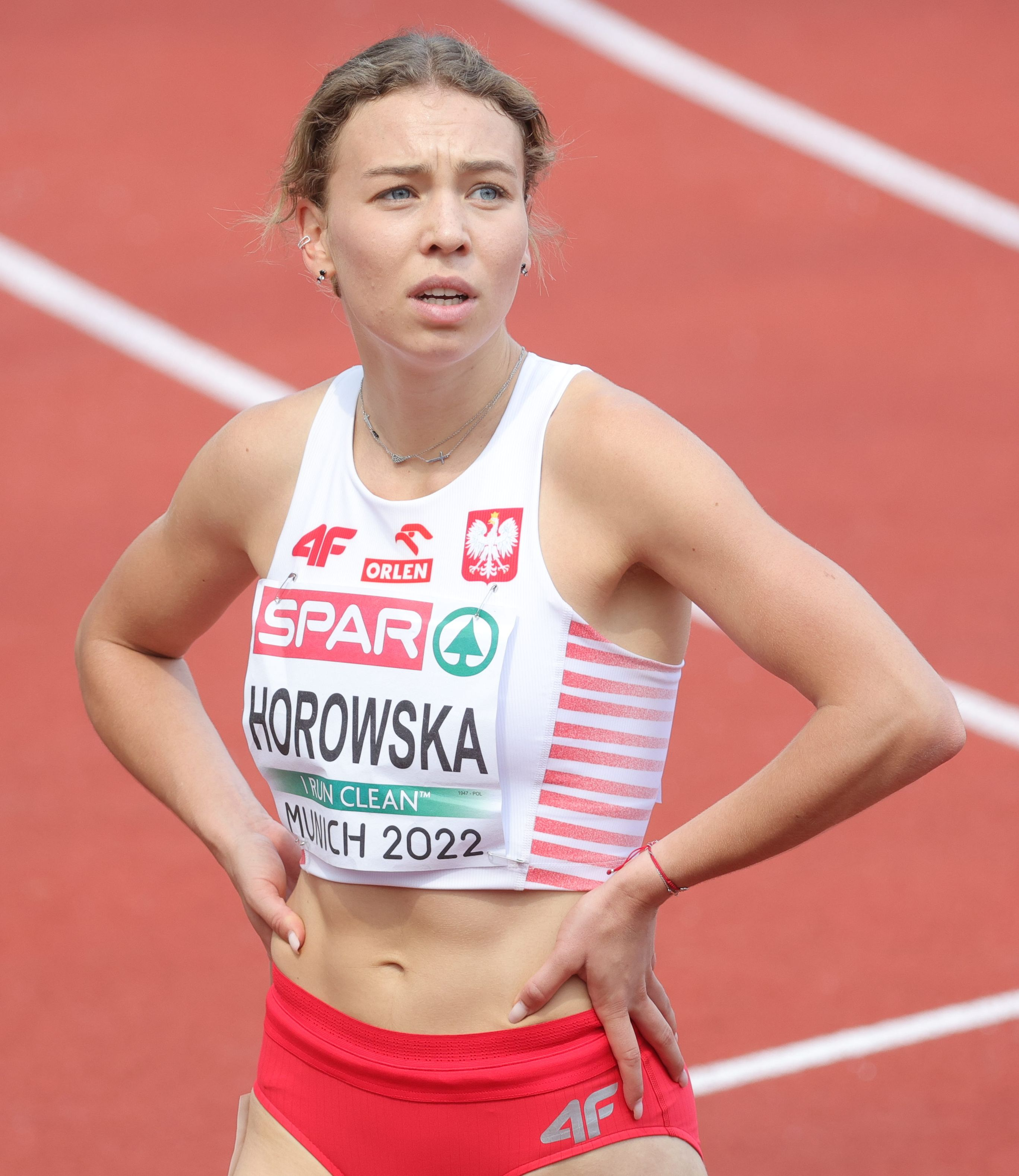
- Nikola Horowska in 2022

Personal information
- Born: 3 January 2001 (age 25) Świętno, Poland
- Education: The Jacob of Paradies University
- Height: 1.75 m (5 ft 9 in)
- Weight: 61 kg (134 lb)

Sport
- Country: Poland
- Sport: Track and field
- Events: Sprints, long jump
- Club: Iskra Wolsztyn (2014–2018); Nadodrze Powodowo (2018–2021); ALKS AJP Gorzów Wielkopolski (2022–)
- Coached by: Jacek Skwierzyński (–2018); Artur Walczak-Mortezael (2018–2021); Tomasz Saska (2022–)

Nikola Horowska (born 3 January 2001) is a Polish athlete competing primarily in the 200 metres and long jump. She won two gold medals at the 2023 World University Games.

== International competitions ==
Representing Poland
Year	Competition	Venue	Position	Event	Notes
2022	European Championships	Munich, Germany	20th (sf)	200 m	23.62
2023	European U23 Championships	Espoo, Finland	6th	200 m	23.53
2023	European U23 Championships	Espoo, Finland	6th	4 × 100 m relay	43.87
2023	European U23 Championships	Espoo, Finland	4th	4 × 400 m relay	3:31.38
2023	European U23 Championships	Espoo, Finland	12th	Long jump	4.00 m
2023	World University Games	Chengdu, China	1st	200 m	23.00
2023	World University Games	Chengdu, China	2nd	4 × 100 m relay	44.20
2023	World University Games	Chengdu, China	1st	Long jump	6.60 m
2024	European Championships	Rome, Italy	21st (q)	Long jump	6.46 m
2024	Olympic Games	Paris, France	27th (q)	Long jump	6.31 m
2025	European Indoor Championships	Apeldoorn, Netherlands	11th (q)	Long jump	6.42 m
2025	World University Games	Bochum, Germany	26th (sf)	200 m	24.18
2025	World University Games	Bochum, Germany	5th	4 × 100 m relay	44.05
2025	World University Games	Bochum, Germany	14th (q)	Long jump	6.11 m
2025	World Championships	Tokyo, Japan	22nd (q)	Long jump	6.39 m

=== Personal bests ===
Outdoor

- 100 metres – 11.38 (+0.7 m/s, Włocławek 2023)
- 200 metres – 22.98 (0.0 m/s, Bern 2022)
- Long jump – 6.61 (-0.1 m/s, Gorzów Wielkopolski 2023)

Indoor

- 60 metres – 7.32 (Toruń 2022)
- 200 metres – 23.22 (Toruń 2022)
- Long jump – 6.45 (Toruń 2023)
