= Briana Williams =

Jamaican-American sprinter (born 2002)

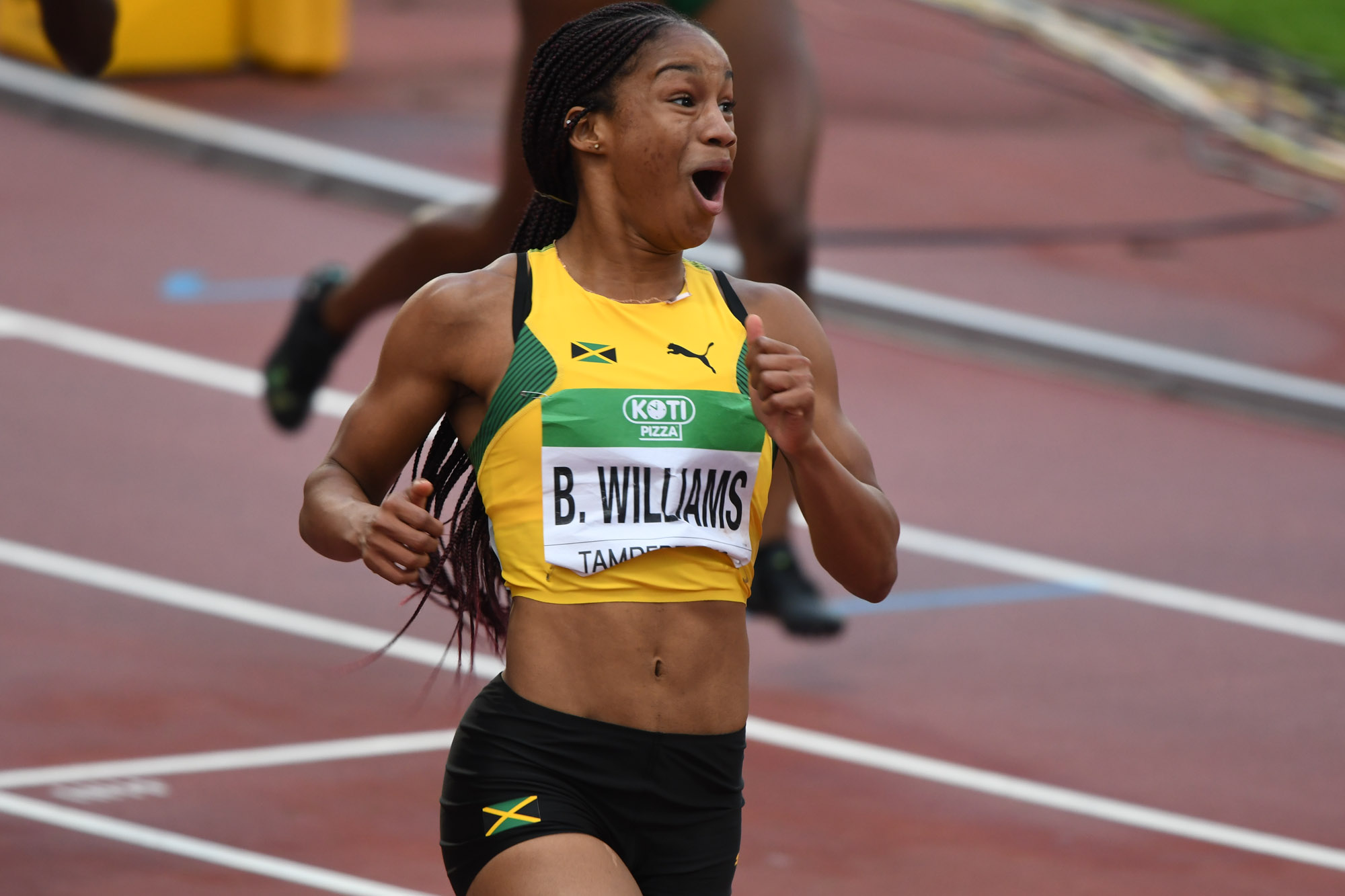

Personal information
- Full name: Briana Nichole Williams
- Nationality: Jamaican; American
- Born: 21 March 2002 (age 24) Miami, Florida, U.S.

Sport
- Country: Jamaica
- Sport: Track and field
- Event: Sprints
- Club: Born 2 Do It
- Turned pro: 2020
- Coached by: Ato Boldon

Achievements and titles
- Personal bests: 100 m: 10.94 (2022); 200 m: 22.50 (2018)
Medal record
Women's athletics
Representing Jamaica
Olympic Games
Gold medal – first place	2020 Tokyo	4 × 100 m relay
World Championships
Silver medal – second place	2022 Eugene	4 × 100 m relay
Silver medal – second place	2023 Budapest	4 × 100 m relay
World Relays
Gold medal – first place	2026 Gaborone	4×100 m relay
World U20 Championships
Gold medal – first place	2018 Tampere	100 m
Gold medal – first place	2018 Tampere	200 m
NACAC Championships
Bronze medal – third place	2022 Freeport	4 × 100 m relay
Pan American U20 Championships
Gold medal – first place	2019 San José	100 m
Silver medal – second place	2019 San José	4 × 100 m relay
NACAC Championships (U18)
Gold medal – first place	2019 Queretaro	100 m

Briana Nichole Williams (born March 21, 2002) is a Jamaican-American athlete who competes over 100 metres and 200 metres. She became the youngest athlete to win the women's 100 metres and 200 metres double at the 2018 World Under-20 Championships in Tampere at age 16.

She holds the girls' 100 metres age-15 world record with a time of 11.13 seconds, set in March 2018. She is the Jamaican under-18 and under-20 record holder in the women's 200 metres, and was Jamaica"s under-18 and under-20 record holder in the women's 100 metres with personal bests of 22.50 seconds and 10.97 seconds respectively.

== Athletics career ==
=== 2018 ===
On March 17 at the Bob Hayes Invitational in Jacksonville, Florida, Williams broke the world age-15 record in the girls' 100 metres, winning in a time of 11.13 seconds. The previous record had been 11.17 seconds, set almost 27 years prior by Marion Jones on 1 June 1991.

Two weeks later she earned gold medals in the 100 metres, the 200 metres, and the 4 × 100 metres relay at the 2018 CARIFTA Games in the under-17 category, setting championship records in the 100 metres and 4 × 100 metres relay.

In July she became the youngest athlete ever to win both the women's 100 metres and the 200 metres at the 2018 IAAF World U20 Championships in Tampere.

=== 2019 ===
At the 2019 CARIFTA Games in April, Williams again tripled in the 100 m, 200 m, and 4 × 100 m relay to win three gold medals in the under-20 category.

On 1 June, Williams set a new Jamaican under-18 and under-20 record in the women's 100 metres at the JAC Open in Jacksonville, Florida, improving on Kiara Grant's under-20 record set the month prior by one hundredth of a second to 11.10 seconds. Grant took the record back a week later at the NCAA Division I Championships in Austin, Texas with a 11.04 seconds finish in the final, but less than an hour later Williams improved the record to 11.02 seconds at the Great Southwest Classic in Albuquerque, New Mexico.

Williams ran 10.94 s in the 100 m final at the Jamaican Championships on 21 June 2019, which would have set the world under-18 best time and improved her Jamaican under-20 record. However, she tested positive for the banned diuretic hydrochlorothiazide during the competition. While she was ruled to be not at fault and received no period of ineligibility to compete, her results from the Jamaican Championships were deleted from the records.

=== 2021 ===
Williams improved her official Jamaican under-20 record of 11.02 seconds in the women's 100 metres at the JAC Summer Open in Jacksonville, Florida on 30 May, clocking 11.19 seconds in the prelims and then winning the final in 11.01 seconds. A day later in the American Track League at the same track she ran 10.97 in the prelims, but the time was assisted by a +2.5 m/s wind, making it ineligible for record purposes which allow no more than a +2.0 m/s wind velocity. In the final she clocked 10.98 seconds to win with only a +1.0 m/s wind, setting her second Jamaican under-20 record in two days. In June 2021, Williams placed fourth at the Jamaican National Championships with a time of 11.01 in the 100 metres, thus not qualifying for the 2020 Summer Olympics in that event. However, she competed at the Olympics as a part of the 4 × 100 metres relay team, winning the gold medal.

== Awards and recognition ==
Williams earned the Austin Sealy award at the CARIFTA Games in 2018 and then 2019 for her records set and gold medals earned in the 100 metres, 200 metres, and 4 × 100 metres relay in both editions. She was the first Jamaican athlete to win the award two years in a row since Usain Bolt in 2004.

For her athletics achievements in 2018 she was nominated for the IAAF Female Rising Star and the Laureus Breakthrough of the Year awards.

== Statistics ==
- Information from World Athletics profile unless otherwise noted.

=== Personal bests ===
Event	Time (s)	Wind (m/s)	Venue	Date	Notes
60 metres	7.15	-1.1	Kingston, Jamaica	25 January 2020	Jamaican U20 record
60 metres indoor	7.04	—N/a	Belgrade, Serbia	18 March 2022	Jamaican U23 indoor record
100 metres	10.97	+1.2	Miramar, FL, United States	5 June 2021	Jamaican U20 record (Note: Williams finished third in 10.94 s at the 2019 Jamaican Championships, which would have been a world under-18 best time and improved her Jamaican under-20 record. However, she tested positive for the banned diuretic hydrochlorothiazide during the competition. She was ruled to be not at fault and received no period of ineligibility to compete, but her results from the Jamaican Championships were nullified.)
100 metres	10.93 w	+3.6	Miramar, FL, United States	5 June 2021	(wind-assisted)
200 metres	22.50	-0.1	Tampere, Finland	14 July 2018	Jamaican U18 and U20 record
4 × 100 m relay	41.02	—N/a	Tokyo, Japan	6 August 2021	Jamaican national record, 2nd all-time

=== International competitions ===
Representing Jamaica
Year	Competition	Venue	Position	Event	Time	Wind (m/s)	Notes
2017	CARIFTA Games (U18)	Willemstad, Curaçao	3rd	100 m	11.80	−1.6	
2018	CARIFTA Games (U17)	Nassau, Bahamas	1st	100 m	11.27	+1.6	CR
2018	CARIFTA Games (U17)	Nassau, Bahamas	1st	200 m	23.11	+1.1	PB
2018	CARIFTA Games (U17)	Nassau, Bahamas	1st	4 × 100 m relay	44.95	—N/a	PB CR
2018	World U20 Championships	Tampere, Finland	1st	100 m	11.16	0.0	
2018	World U20 Championships	Tampere, Finland	1st	200 m	22.50	−0.1	NU18R NU20R CR
2019	CARIFTA Games (U20)	Georgetown, Cayman Islands	1st	100 m	11.25	+0.3	SB
2019	CARIFTA Games (U20)	Georgetown, Cayman Islands	1st	200 m	22.89	+0.9	SB
2019	CARIFTA Games (U20)	Georgetown, Cayman Islands	1st	4 × 100 m relay	44.25	—N/a	PB
2019	NACAC U18 Championships	Querétaro, Mexico	1st	100 m	11.11	+1.5	CR
2019	Pan American U20 Championships	San José, Costa Rica	1st	100 m	11.38	−1.4	
2019	Pan American U20 Championships	San José, Costa Rica	2nd	4 × 100 m relay	44.36	—N/a	
2021	Olympic Games	Tokyo, Japan	1st	4 × 100 m relay	41.02	—N/a	NR
2022	World Indoor Championships	Belgrade, Serbia	6th	60 m	7.04	—N/a	
2023	World Championships	Budapest, Hungary	2nd	4 × 100 m relay	41.21	—N/a	
2024	World Indoor Championships	Glasgow, United Kingdom	14th (sf)	60 m	7.19	—N/a	
2026	World Relays	Gaborone, Botswana	1st	4 × 100 m relay	42.00	—N/a	

=== National championships ===
Year	Competition	Venue	Position	Event	Time	Wind (m/s)	Notes
2017	Jamaican U20 Championships	Kingston, Jamaica	2nd	100 m	11.30	+1.6	PB
2017	Jamaican U20 Championships	Kingston, Jamaica	2nd	200 m	23.57	+0.5	PB
2018	Jamaican Championships	Kingston, Jamaica	5th	100 m	11.21	+0.4	
2019	Jamaican Championships	Kingston, Jamaica	~~3rd~~ DQ	100 m	~~10.94~~	+0.6	
2021	Jamaican Championships	Kingston, Jamaica	4th	100 m	11.01	-	

=== Seasonal bests ===
- w = wind-assisted (over +2.0 m/s)

Year	100 metres	200 metres
2014	13.25	—
2015	12.09	24.79
2016	12.58	26.16
2017	11.30	23.56
2018	11.13	22.50
2019	11.02	22.88
2020	12.43	24.70
2021	10.97	22.93 w
2022	11.03	22.81
2023	11.01	23.38
