= Lauren Roy =

Irish sprinter (born 2000)

Personal information
- Born: 25 September 2000 (age 25)

Sport
- Sport: Athletics
- Event: Sprint

Achievements and titles
- Personal bests: 60m: 7.19 (2026); 100m: 11.23 (2026); 200m: 22.83 (2026)

Lauren Roy (born 25 September 2000) is an Irish sprinter. She has represented Ireland at the World Athletics Championships and is the Northern Ireland record holder over 200 metres and second on the Irish all-time indoor list in the 200 metres and 60 metres.

== Biography ==
Roy trained as a Fast Twitch AC athlete and was coached by Tim Thompson. Roy travelled as a member of the Ireland relay pool at the 2018 IAAF World U20 Championships. She won the Irish U-20 indoor title over 60 metres with a personal best of 7.42 seconds in February 2019. She subsequently made her senior international debut as an 18-year-old at the 2019 European Athletics Indoor Championships in Glasgow, Scotland in the 60 metres, but did not progress past her preliminary heat.

Roy competed for Ireland in the 4 x 100 metres relay at the 2022 World Athletics Championships in Eugene, Oregon. In 2022, Roy left Queen’s University, Belfast to go on scholarship to the University of Texas at San Antonio in the United States. She was a member of the Irish team which gained promotion to the second division of the European Athletics Team Championships in June 2023.

Having transferred to Tarleton State University, Roy set a new Northern Ireland 200 m record, breaking the previous record of Amy Foster which had stood for 24 years, with a time of 23.27 seconds in Texas in 2025. Additionally, on 25 April 2025 she ran a wind- assisted time of 22.85 seconds (+3.5) in Stephenville, Texas. She competed for Ireland at the 2025 European Athletics Team Championships Second Division in Maribor, Slovenia, placing fifth in the 200 metres in 23.32 seconds.

Roy was a member of the Irish women's 4 x 100 metres relay team alongside Sarah Leahy, Ciara Neville and Sarah Lavin that broke the Irish national record with a time of 43.73 seconds at the 2025 London Athletics Meet. That month, she was a semi-finalist over 200 metres at the 2025 Summer World University Games in Germany. Roy was runner-up to Neville in the 100 m, and third behind Sharlene Mawdsley and Lavin in the 200 m, at the 2025 Irish Athletics Championships.

In January 2026, Roy ran a 60 metres personal best of 7.25 seconds at the Corky Classic in Lubbock. On 24 January, she ran a 200 m indoor personal best of 22.89 in Texas, moving to second on the Irish all-time indoor list behind Rhasidat Adeleke, and also lowering her 60 m personal best to 7.23 seconds on the same day. She later ran a new best of 7.19 seconds to move joint second on the Irish all-time list, and placed second over 60 metres at the WAC Indoor Championships, finishing behind Victoria Cameron and ahead of Prestina Ochonogor in a Tarleton-sweep of the podium, to help Tarleton win the women's team competition for the first time.

Roy was selected to represent Ireland in the 60 metres at the 2026 World Athletics Indoor Championships in Toruń, Poland, in March 2026, and advanced to the semi-finals by one thousandth of a second after a fourth-place finish in her heat in 7.25 seconds. In May, Roy ran a lifetime best of 22.83 (+2.0m), to also move to second on the Irish outdoor all-time list behind Adeleke and qualified for the 2026 NCAA Outdoor Championships. She also lowered her 100 m personal best to 11.23 seconds. However, because the NCAA Championships clashed with the NI & Ulster Senior Championships, she was then not selected for the 2026 Commonwealth Games. At the Irish Championships on 25 July, she placed second to Adeleke in the 200 metres. In August, she was part of the Ireland women’s 4 x 100 metres relay team that set a new national record of 43.13 at the 2026 European Athletics Championships in Birmingham, England. She also competed in the women's 200 metres at the championships, reaching the semi-finals.

== Personal life ==
She was educated at Tarleton State University in Texas, United States.
