= Ben Buckingham =

Australian steeplechase runner

Personal information
- Full name: Benjamin Buckingham
- Born: 8 November 1991 (age 34) Myrtleford, Victoria, Australia

Sport
- Country: Australia
- Sport: Track and field
- Event: 3000 metres steeplechase
Medal record
Men's athletics
Representing Australia
Oceania Athletics Championships
Gold medal – first place	2019 Townsville	3000 m s'chase
Silver medal – second place	2024 Suva	3000 m s'chase

Benjamin Buckingham (born 8 November 1991) is an Australian track and field athlete who specializes in the 3000 metres steeplechase.

== Early years ==
Buckingham grew up on a 600-acre cattle farm and started serious running at the age of 10 with his mother. When he was 18 years of age he left his hometown of Myrtleford, Victoria to go to the University of Melbourne. Buckingham continued his running and came third in the 2010 National U20 steeplechase.

Buckingham made his international debut at the 2010 World Mountain Running Championships in Slovenia, competing in the junior race. After completing his studies he ran 8:03 (3000m) and 8:54 (steeple) and was placed third in the national championships in the summer of 2016.2017. In 2019 he dropped to 7:54.00 (3000m) and 8:27.51 (steeple) and won the Oceania Championships.

== Achievements ==
Buckingham completed his second degree (Juris Doctor/law and Arts - history/international relations) at the age of 25 in 2016. He trained full time for six months before starting work as a Lawyer at Minter Ellison.

Buckingham won the gold medal in the men's 3000 metres steeplechase at the 2019 Oceania Athletics Championships held in Townsville, Australia. He also competed in the men's 3000 metres steeplechase event at the 2019 World Athletics Championships held in Doha, Qatar. He did not qualify to compete in the final.

In 2020, Buckingham headed to Europe where he clocked two 8:24s with a best of 8:24.39 to move to sixth Australian all-time.

Buckingham qualified for the men's 3000 metres steeplechase event at the 2020 Summer Olympics held in Tokyo, Japan. He ran seventh in the Men's 3000m steeplechase heat with a time of 8:20.95, missing out on the final.
