= Esperança Cladera =

Spanish sprinter

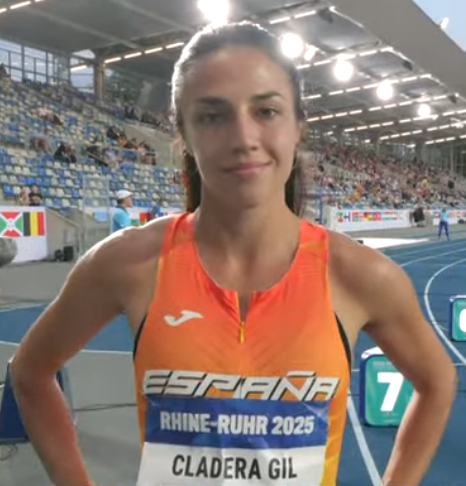
- At the 2025 Summer World University Games

Personal information
- Full name: Esperança Cladera Gil
- Born: 14 May 2002 (age 24)

Sport
- Sport: Athletics
- Event: Sprint

Achievements and titles
- Personal bests: 100m 11.61 (2025); 200m: 22.79 (2025)
Medal record
Women's athletics
Representing Spain
World Relays
Silver medal – second place	2025 Guangzhou	4×100 m relay
Bronze medal – third place	2026 Gaborone	4×100 m relay
World University Games
Bronze medal – third place	2025 Bochum	200 m

Esperança Cladera Gil (born 14 May 2002) is a Spanish sprinter. In 2025, she won the Spanish Indoor Athletics Championships over 200 metres. She was a member of the Spanish 4 x 100 metres relay team which set new Spanish national records whilst running at the 2025 World Athletics Relays and the 2025 European Team Championships.

== Biography ==
From Mallorca, she finished in fifth place in the 200 metres at the 2018 European Athletics U18 Championships in Gyor, Hungary.

By 2024, she had become a member of Valencia Club Atletismo. She made her senior championship debut when she competed for Spain at the 2024 European Athletics Championships in Rome, Italy, reaching the semi-finals of the 200 metres.

In February 2025, she won the 200 metres at the Spanish Indoor Athletics Championships. She was selected for the Spanish relay pool for the 2025 World Athletics Relays in China. In the 4 x 100 metres relay she was part of a team alongside Jaël Bestué, Paula Sevilla, and Maria Isabel Perez who won their opening race ahead of Jamaica containing Shelly-Ann Fraser-Pryce and Shericka Jackson, with a time of 42.18 seconds, setting a Spanish national record, and ensuring qualification for the 2025 World Championships.

She was part of the Spanish 4 x 100 metres team, again alongside Bestué, Sevilla and Maribel Pérez, which set another new Spanish record of 42.11 seconds at the 2025 European Athletics Team Championships First Division in Madrid on 28 June. She won a bronze medal at the 2025 Summer World University Games in the 200 metres in Bochum, Germany.

In September 2025, she competed in the women's 4 x 100 metres at the 2025 World Championships in Tokyo, Japan, as part of the Spanish team which placed fifth overall.

Cladera was selected as part of the Spanish team for the 2026 World Athletics Relays in Gaborone, Botswana. On the opening day she ran as part the women's 4x100m relay team alongside Jaël Bestué, Lucía Carrillo and Maribel Pérez as they ran 42.26 to win the first heat ahead of Canada and qualifying for the final with the second-fastest overall time, surpassed only by Jamaica. The following day, the quartet won the bronze medal in the final behind Jamaica and Canada. In June, Cladera won over 200 metres at the Josef Odložil Memorial in Prague. August 2026, she competed at the 2026 European Athletics Championships in Birmingham, England, in the women's 200 metres, reaching the semi-finals.
