= Twanisha Terry =

American sprinter (born 1999)

Twanisha Terry OLY
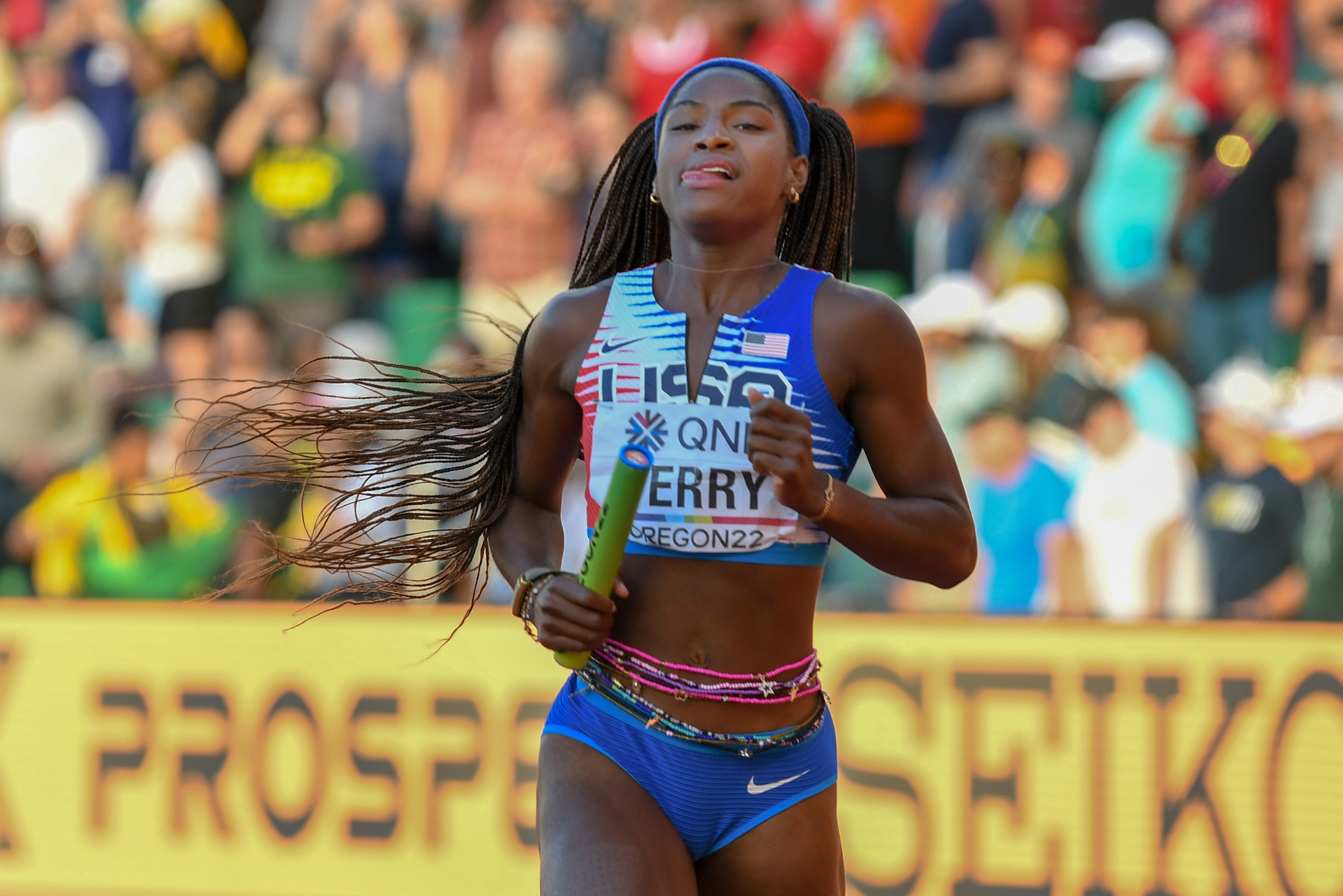
- Terry at the 2022 World Athletics Championships in Eugene

Personal information
- Nickname: TeeTee
- Born: January 24, 1999 (age 27) Miami, Florida, U.S.
- Employer: Nike
- Height: 5 ft 5 in (165 cm)

Sport
- Country: United States
- Sport: Track and field
- Event: Sprints
- College team: USC Trojans (2018–2021)
- Coached by: Dennis Mitchell

Achievements and titles
- Personal bests: 100 m: 10.87 (2022); 200 m: 22.21 (2023); Indoors; 60 m: 7.09 (2021)
Medal record
Women's athletics
Representing the United States
Olympic Games
Gold medal – first place	2024 Paris	4 × 100 m relay
World Championships
Gold medal – first place	2022 Eugene	4 × 100 m relay
Gold medal – first place	2023 Budapest	4 × 100 m relay
Gold medal – first place	2025 Tokyo	4 × 100 m relay
Pan American Games
Bronze medal – third place	2019 Lima	4 × 100 m relay
World U20 Championships
Silver medal – second place	2018 Tampere	100 m

Twanisha "TeeTee" Terry OLY (born January 24, 1999) is an American sprinter specializing in the 100 meters distance. She has earned two World Athletics Championships gold medals as part of U.S. women's 4 × 100 m relays: at the 2022 World Athletics Championships and 2023 World Athletics Championships.

At age 19, in April 2018, Terry ran the 100 m in a time of 10.99 seconds at the Mt. SAC Relays, becoming the joint fourth-fastest under-20 woman in history. The same year, she won the gold medal in the 100 m at the USATF U20 Championships and the silver medal over the distance at the World U20 Championships. She won one individual NCAA Division I title.

== Achievements ==
Information from World Athletics profile unless otherwise noted.

=== Personal bests ===
Event	Time	Wind (m/s)	Venue	Date	Notes
60 meters	7.09	—N/a	Fayetteville, Arkansas, U.S.	March 12, 2021	
100 meters	10.87	+1.8	Eugene, Oregon, U.S.	June 24, 2022	
100 meters	10.74 w	+2.9	Eugene, Oregon, U.S.	June 24, 2022	(wind-assisted)
200 meters	22.21	+0.3	Eugene Oregon U.S.	Sep 17, 2023	
200 meters indoor	22.75	—N/a	Fayetteville, Arkansas, U.S.	March 13, 2021	
4 × 100 m relay	41.03	—N/a	Budapest, Hungary	August 26, 2023	

=== International competitions ===
Representing the United States
Year	Competition	Venue	Position	Event	Time	Notes
2018	World U20 Championships	Tampere, Finland	2nd	100 m	11.19	0.0 m/s
2019	NACAC U23 Championships	Querétaro, Mexico	2nd	100 m	11.08 w	+3.3 m/s (wind-assisted)
2019	NACAC U23 Championships	Querétaro, Mexico	1st	4 × 100 m relay	42.97	
2019	Pan American Games	Lima, Peru	5th	100 m	11.37	-0.6 m/s
2019	Pan American Games	Lima, Peru	3rd	4 × 100 m relay	43.39	
2022	World Championships	Eugene, OR, United States	1st	4 × 100 m relay	41.14	
2023	World Championships	Budapest, Hungary	1st	4 × 100 m relay	41.03	
2024	Olympic Games	Paris, France	5th	100 m	10.97	
2024	Olympic Games	Paris, France	1st	4 × 100 m relay	41.78	
2025	World Relays	Guangzhou, China	4th	4 × 100 m relay	42.38	
2025	NACAC Championships	Freeport, Bahamas	9th (h)	100 m	11.33	
2025	World Championships	Tokyo, Japan	11th (sf)	100 m	11.07	
2025	World Championships	Tokyo, Japan	1st	4 × 100 m relay	41.75	

=== National championships ===
Representing Metro-Dade Track Club (2013), Miami Northwestern Bulls (2013–2017), USC Trojans (2017–2021) and Nike (2021–)
Year	Competition	Venue	Position	Event	Time	Notes
2013	AAU Junior Olympic Nationals	Ypsilanti, Michigan	1st	4 × 100 m relay	47.30	
2014	NSAF Nationals	Greensboro, North Carolina	1st	100 m	11.89	-1.0 m/s
2014	NSAF Nationals	Greensboro, North Carolina	1st	4 × 100 m relay	46.03	
2014	NSAF Nationals	Greensboro, North Carolina	2nd	4 × 200 m relay	1:37.10	
2015	NSAF Nationals	Greensboro, North Carolina	1st (p)	4 × 100 m relay	45.52	
2015	NSAF Nationals	Greensboro, North Carolina	1st	4 × 200 m relay	1:34.87	
2015	NSAF Nationals	Greensboro, North Carolina	5th	Swedish relay	2:10.99	
2015	U.S. World Youth Trials	Lisle, Illinois	5th	100 m	11.83	-0.8 m/s
2015	U.S. World Youth Trials	Lisle, Illinois	4th	200 m	23.96	+1.0 m/s PB
2016	NSAF Nationals	Greensboro, North Carolina	2nd	100 m	11.41	+1.0 m/s
2016	NSAF Nationals	Greensboro, North Carolina	– (f)	4 × 200 m relay	DQ	
2016	NSAF Nationals	Greensboro, North Carolina	2nd	4 × 400 m relay	3:40.56	
2016	NSAF Nationals	Greensboro, North Carolina	3rd	Swedish relay	2:08.97	
2017	NSAF Nationals	Greensboro, North Carolina	2nd	100 m	11.37	+0.9 m/s
2017	NSAF Nationals	Greensboro, North Carolina	3rd	4 × 100 m relay	45.44	
2017	NSAF Nationals	Greensboro, North Carolina	2nd	4 × 200 m relay	1:35.76	
2017	NSAF Nationals	Greensboro, North Carolina	2nd	4 × 400 m relay	3:39.99	
2017	NSAF Nationals	Greensboro, North Carolina	2nd	Swedish relay	2:06.33	
2018	NCAA Division I Indoor Championships	College Station, Texas	9th (p)	60 m	7.22	PB
2018	NCAA Division I Championships	Eugene, Oregon	3rd	100 m	11.39	-0.7 m/s
2018	NCAA Division I Championships	Eugene, Oregon	11th	200 m	22.82	+1.0 m/s
2018	NCAA Division I Championships	Eugene, Oregon	3rd	4 × 100 m relay	43.11	
2018	USATF U20 Championships	Bloomington, Indiana	1st	100 m	11.24	-1.1 m/s
2019	NCAA Division I Indoor Championships	Birmingham, Alabama	1st	60 m	7.14	PB
2019	NCAA Division I Championships	Austin, Texas	3rd	100 m	10.98	+1.6 m/s PB
2019	NCAA Division I Championships	Austin, Texas	16th	200 m	23.15	+1.3 m/s
2019	NCAA Division I Championships	Austin, Texas	1st	4 × 100 m relay	42.21	
2019	USATF Championships	Des Moines, Iowa	5th	100 m	11.32	-1.7 m/s
2021	NCAA Division I Indoor Championships	Fayetteville, Arkansas	2nd	60 m	7.14	
2021	NCAA Division I Indoor Championships	Fayetteville, Arkansas	4th	200 m	22.75	PB
2021	NCAA Division I Championships	Eugene, Oregon	2nd	100 m	10.79 w	+2.2 m/s
2021	NCAA Division I Championships	Eugene, Oregon	5th	200 m	22.69	+0.2 m/s
2021	NCAA Division I Championships	Eugene, Oregon	1st	4 × 100 m relay	42.82	
2021	U.S. Olympic Trials	Eugene, Oregon	9th (sf)	100 m	11.04 w	+2.5 m/s
2022	USATF Championships	Eugene, Oregon	3rd	100 m	10.74 w	+2.9 m/s
2023	USATF Championships	Eugene, Oregon	6th	100 m	11.05	+0.7 m/s
2023	USATF Championships	Eugene, Oregon	5th	200 m	22.17	-0.4 m/s
2024	U.S. Olympic Trials	Eugene, Oregon	3rd	100 m	10.89	+0.8 m/s
