= Kristie Edwards =

Australian sprinter (born 2000)

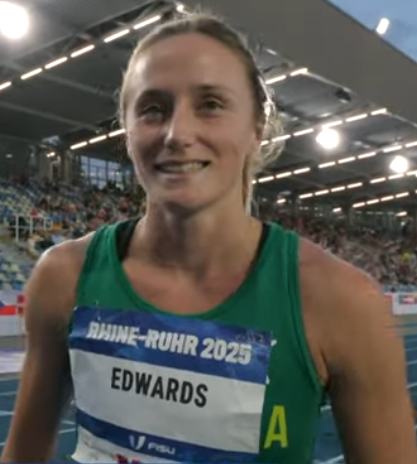
- At the 2025 Summer World University Games

Personal information
- Nationality: Australian
- Born: 24 February 2000 (age 26)

Sport
- Sport: Track and Field
- Event: Sprint

Achievements and titles
- Personal best(s): 60m: 7.24 (2025); 100m: 11.26 (2025); 200m: 22.81 (2025)
Medal record
Women's athletics
Representing Australia
Oceania Championships
Gold medal – first place	2019 Townsville	4x100m relay
Summer World University Games
Gold medal – first place	2025 Bochum	4x100m relay

Kristie Edwards (born 24 February 2000) is an Australian sprinter.

== Early life ==
She attended Newport Public School and from 2017, Pymble Ladies' College in New South Wales. On leaving school, she studied at the University of Technology Sydney.

== Career ==
She started running for the Newport Nippers in New South Wales. Edwards gained her first experience at international championships in 2018, when she finished seventh with the Australian 4 × 100 m relay team at the 2018 World Athletics U20 Championships in Tampere, setting a new Australian junior record.

She won gold in the 4 × 100 m relay at the 2019 Oceania Athletics Championships in Townsville in 44.47 seconds, along with Nana Owusu-Afriyie, Riley Day, and Celeste Mucci. She competed for Australia at the 2019 IAAF World Relays and was named in the squad for the 2019 World Athletics Championships in Doha.

In 2020, she moved from Sydney, to be based in Queensland. She is a member of Noosa athletics club.

She was part of the Australian squad selected to compete in the 4 × 100 m sprint relay at the 2023 World Athletics Championships in Budapest.

At the 2024 London Athletics Meet in July 2024, she was part of the Australian 4x100 metres team alongside Torrie Lewis, Ella Connolly and Bree Masters that set a new Australian and Oceania record of 42.48 seconds. She participated in the relay at the 2024 Summer Olympics in Paris, as they finished fifth in their heat in 42.75 seconds.

She finished runner-up to Jessica Milat in the 200 metres race at the 2025 Australian Athletics Championships on 13 April 2025, running a personal best time of 22.81 seconds. She competed at the 2025 World Athletics Relays in China in the Women's 4 × 100 metres relay in May 2025. She was selected for the 2025 Summer World University Games in Germany, winning the gold medal in the women's 4 x 100 metres relay.

In September 2025, she competed in the 200 metres at the 2025 World Championships in Tokyo, Japan. She also ran in the women's 4 x 100 metres relay at the championships.
