= Brooke Ironside =

British sprinter

Personal information
- Born: 18 June 2003 (age 23)

Sport
- Sport: Athletics
- Event: Sprint

Achievements and titles
- Personal bests: 60m: 7.37 (London, 2025); 100m: 11.47 (Rhede, 2024); 200m: 23.11 (Karlstad, 2024)

Brooke Ironside (born 18 June 2003) is a British sprinter.

== Biography ==
A member of Bournemouth Athletics Club in Dorset, Ironside studied Sport, Exercise and Health science at AECC University College in Bournemouth.

=== 2024 ===
Ironside won the 200 metres in a championships best of 23.37 at the British Universities and Colleges Sport (BUCS) Indoor Championships in February 2024, also placing third over 60 metres. That month, she placed third in the 200 metres at the 2024 British Indoor Athletics Championships behind Ama Pipi and Success Eduan, running 23.68 in both her semi-final and the final. She achieved a personal best 23.21 seconds in finishing sixth in the 200 metres final at the 2024 British Athletics Championships, won by Dina Asher-Smith in July 2024. That summer, she lowered her personal best for the 200 metres to 23.11 seconds at the Folksam Grand Prix in Sweden.

=== 2025 ===
Ironside won the 200 metres at the 2025 BUCS Indoor Championships in 23.60 seconds in February 2025. She reached the final of the 200 metres at the 2025 British Indoor Athletics Championships in Birmingham later that month, placing fourth overall after winning her heat and her semi-final races. That summer, she was named in the British team for the 2025 Summer World University Games in Bochum, Germany, where she qualified for the final of the 200 metres, placing seventh overall.

=== 2026 ===
On 14 February 2026, competing at the 2026 British Indoor Athletics Championships, she qualified for the final and placed third overall the following day from lane two, finishing behind Renee Regis and Hannah Brier.

== Athletic Achievements ==
=== Personal bests ===
Type	Distance	Result	Wind (m/s)	Venue	Date	Notes
Individual events
Outdoor	100 metres	11.47s	+2.0	Rhede, Germany	14 July 2024	
Outdoor	200 metres	23.11s	+1.4	Karlstad, Sweden	4 July 2024	
Outdoor	400 metres	55.21s	—N/a	Woking, United Kingdom	10 September 2022	
Outdoor	Long Jump	6.19m	+1.4	Chelmsford, United Kingdom	18 June 2022	
Outdoor	Triple Jump	11.21m	+1.9	Bournemouth, United Kingdom	29 May 2022	
Indoor	60 metres	7.37s	—N/a	London, United Kingdom	5 January 2025	
Indoor	200 metres sh	23.37s	—N/a	Sheffield, United Kingdom	25 February 2024	

=== National championships and competitions ===
Year	Competition	Venue	Position	Event	Result	Notes
2021	British Championships	Manchester	33rd (h)	100 m	12.82s	
2022	England Indoor Championships, U20 events	Sheffield	6th	60 m	7.59s	
2022	England Indoor Championships, U20 events	Sheffield	3rd	200 m sh	24.28s	SB
2022	British Indoor Championships	Birmingham	14th (sf)	60 m	7.57s	
2022	British Indoor Championships	Birmingham	8th (h)	200 m sh	24.79s	
2022	England Championships, U20 events	Bedford	6th	100 m	12.03s	
2022	England Championships, U20 events	Bedford	13th	Long jump	3.85m	
2022	England Championships, U20 events	Bedford	4th	200 m	24.37s	
2023	British Indoor Championships	Birmingham	13th (sf)	60 m	7.63s	
2023	British Indoor Championships	Birmingham	10th (sf)	200 m sh	24.50s	
2023	British Indoor Championships	Birmingham	6th	Long jump	5.96m	
2023	England Championships, U23 events	Chelmsford	3rd	Long jump	6.11m	SB
2023	England Championships, U23 events	Chelmsford	3rd	200 m	24.02s	
2023	British Championships	Manchester	18th (sf)	100 m	11.98s	
2023	British Championships	Manchester	19th (h)	200 m	24.15s	
2024	British Indoor Championships	Birmingham	3rd	200 m sh	23.68s	
2024	British Championships	Manchester	6th	200 m	23.21s	
2025	British Indoor Championships	Birmingham	4th	200 m sh	23.79	
2025	British Championships	Birmingham	12th (h)	200 m	23.68	
2026	British Indoor Championships	Birmingham	3rd	200 m sh	23.92s	
2026	British Championships	Birmingham	13th (h)	200 m	23.64	
