= Sophia Junk =

German sprinter (born 1999)

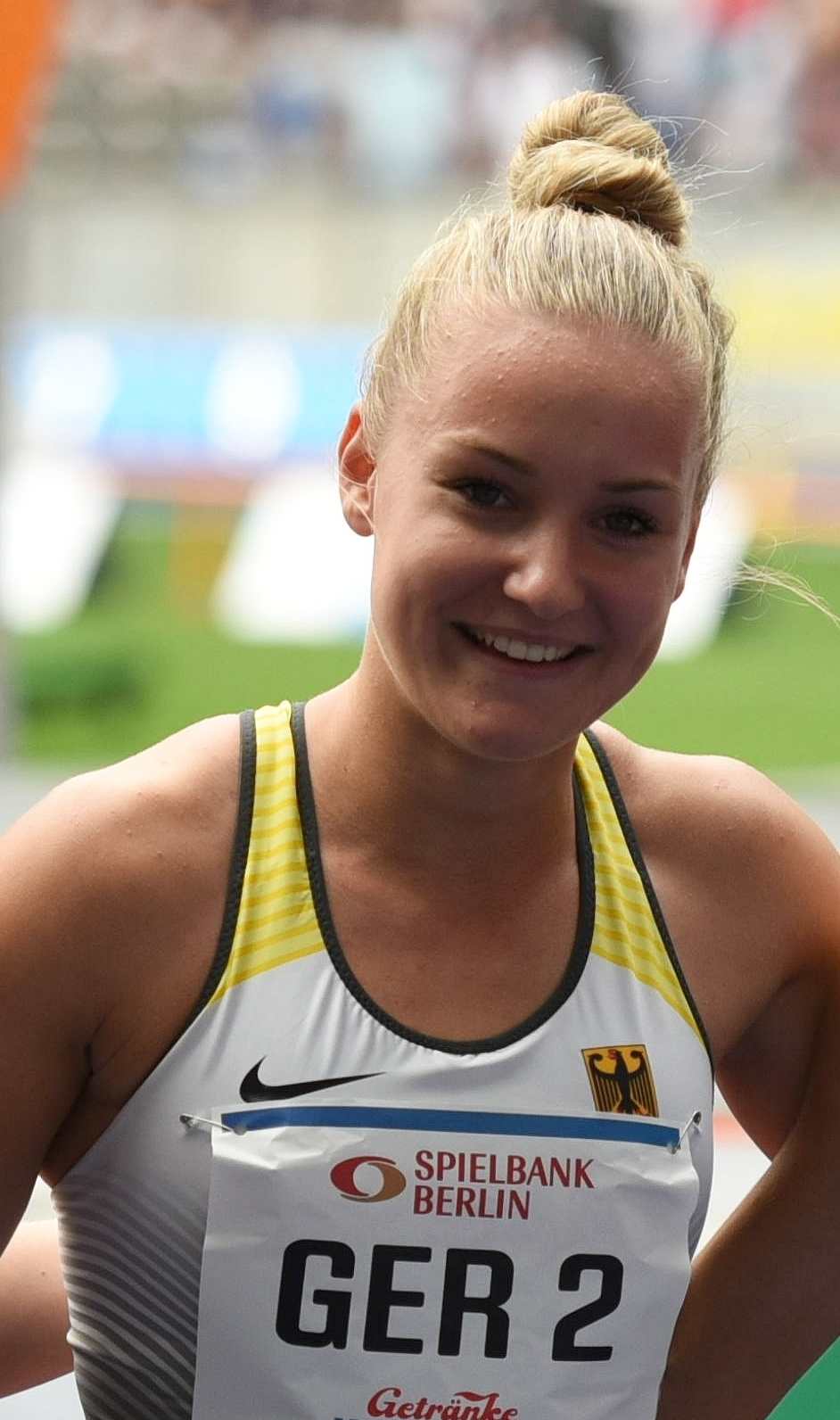
- Junk in 2019

Personal information
- Born: 1 March 1999 (age 27)
- Height: 1.69 m (5 ft 7 in)

Sport
- Sport: Athletics
- Event: Sprint

Achievements and titles
- Personal bests: 60 m: 7.20 (2025); 100 m: 11.26 (2024); 200 m 22.53 (2025)
Medal record
Women's athletics
Representing Germany
Olympic Games
Bronze medal – third place	2024 Paris	4 × 100 m relay
World Championships
Bronze medal – third place	2025 Tokyo	4 × 100 m relay
European U23 Championships
Gold medal – first place	2019 Gävle	4 × 100 m relay
Silver medal – second place	2021 Tallinn	200 m
Gold medal – first place	2021 Tallinn	4 × 100 m relay
World U20 Championships
Gold medal – first place	2018 Tampere	4 × 100 m relay
European U20 Championships
Gold medal – first place	2017 Grosseto	4 × 100 m relay
Silver medal – second place	2017 Grosseto	200 m

Sophia Junk (born 1 March 1999) is a German sprinter. She has competed at multiple major championships, including the 2024 Olympic Games.

== Biography ==
Junk won silver at the 2017 European Athletics U20 Championships in Grosseto in the 200 metres. She was also part of the German 4 × 100 m relay team that broke the U18 world record at those European Championships.

In 2018 she won gold as part of the German 4 × 100 m relay team at the 2018 IAAF World U20 Championships in Tampere. She also ran in the individual 200 metres at the championships, placing fifth in the final.

At the 2019 European Athletics U23 Championships in Sweden, she won gold as part of the German 4 × 100 m relay team. She won silver in the 200 metres and gold in the 4 × 100 m relay at the 2021 European Athletics U23 Championships in Tallinn.

In 2022 she competed at the 2022 World Athletics Championships in Eugene, Oregon in the 200 metres.

In 2024 she was a member of the German 4 × 100 metres relay team at the 2024 European Athletics Championships. She ran in the heats for the Germany relay team in the 4 × 100 metres relay at the 2024 Paris Olympics, earning a bronze medal when the team finished third in the final.

Junk ran in the 60 metres at the 2025 European Athletics Indoor Championships in Appeldoorn, recording a personal best 7.20 seconds in the heats, and running 7.21 seconds in the semi-finals. but did not qualify for the final. She competed at the 2025 World Athletics Relays in China in the Women's 4 × 100 metres relay in May 2025. She ran a personal best 22.52 seconds for the 200 metres as she finished third competing for Germany at the 2025 European Athletics Team Championships First Division in Madrid in June 2025. She placed second in the 100 metres at the German Athletics Championships in August 2025 in Dresden, running 11.33 seconds to finish behind Gina Lückenkemper.

In September 2025, she was a semi-finalist in the 200 metres at the 2025 World Championships in Tokyo, Japan. Junk also ran in the women's 4 × 100 metres relay at the championships, winning the bronze medal with the German team.

Junk placed fifth behind new German champion Philina Schwartz at the German Indoor Championships 60 metres race on 28 February 2026. She was named for the 2026 World Athletics Relays in Gaborone, Botswana, and ran in the women's 4 × 100 metres relay and in the mixed 4 × 100 metres relay team which both qualified from the heats on the opening day of competition, setting a European record in the mixed race. In August 2026, she competed at the 2026 European Athletics Championships in Birmingham, England, in the women's 200 metres, reaching the semi-finals. She also competed in the women's 4 × 100 metres relay at the championships.

== Personal life ==
Junk started training in athletics at seven years old. She is a member of LG Rhein-Wied. She became a member the Rhineland-Palatinate State Police in 2018.
