= Silke Lemmens =

Swiss sprinter

Personal information
- Nationality: Swiss
- Born: 30 November 1999 (age 26) Belgium

Sport
- Sport: Athletics

Silke Lemmens (born 30 November 1999) is a Swiss track and field sprinter. She represented Switzerland at the 2020 Summer Olympics in Tokyo 2021, competing in women's 4 × 400 metres relay.
