= Sarah Leahy =

Irish sprinter (born 1999)

Personal information
- Born: 1 August 1999 (age 27)

Sport
- Sport: Athletics
- Event: Sprint

Sarah Leahy (born 1 August 1999) is an Irish sprinter. She has represented Ireland at the World Athletics Championships and has won Irish national indoor titles over 60 metres.

== Biography ==
Leahy won a silver medal in the Irish under-14 national indoor championships behind future senior national champion Molly Scott but athletics initially took a back seat as she played for the Killarney Legion in Gaelic Football, as well as for Kerry County and for the University of Limerick, prior to focusing fully on athletics in 2021.

She competed for Ireland in the 4 x 100 metre relay at the 2022 World Athletics Championships in Eugene, Oregon. She moved to Dublin and joined the training group in Tallaght coached by Daniel Kilgallon, which produced Irish sprinters such as Rhasidat Adeleke and Israel Olatunde. She won the Irish indoor title over 60 metres in February 2023, running 7.30 seconds, a time that moved her to joint fourth on the Irish all-time list. She was later also runner-up over that distance in 2024.

She regained the national indoor 60 metres title in February 2025, running 7.39 seconds. She was a member of the Irish women's 4 x 100 metres relay team alongside Lauren Roy, Ciara Neville and Sarah Lavin who broke the Irish national record with a time of 43.73 seconds at the 2025 London Athletics Meet.

Leahy was named in the Irish team for the 2026 World Athletics Relays in Botswana, and ran in the women's 4 × 100 m relay. In August, she was part of the Ireland women's 4 x 100 metres relay team that set a new national record of 43.13 at the 2026 European Athletics Championships in Birmingham, England.

== Personal life ==
She is from Killarney in County Kerry and is a member of Killarney Valley AC. She has been involved in a research project at the University of Limerick looking into sprint analytics. She also previously studied engineering at the university and later worked as a technician with a construction company based in Ballymount, Dublin.
