= Léonie Pointet =

Swiss athlete (born 2001)

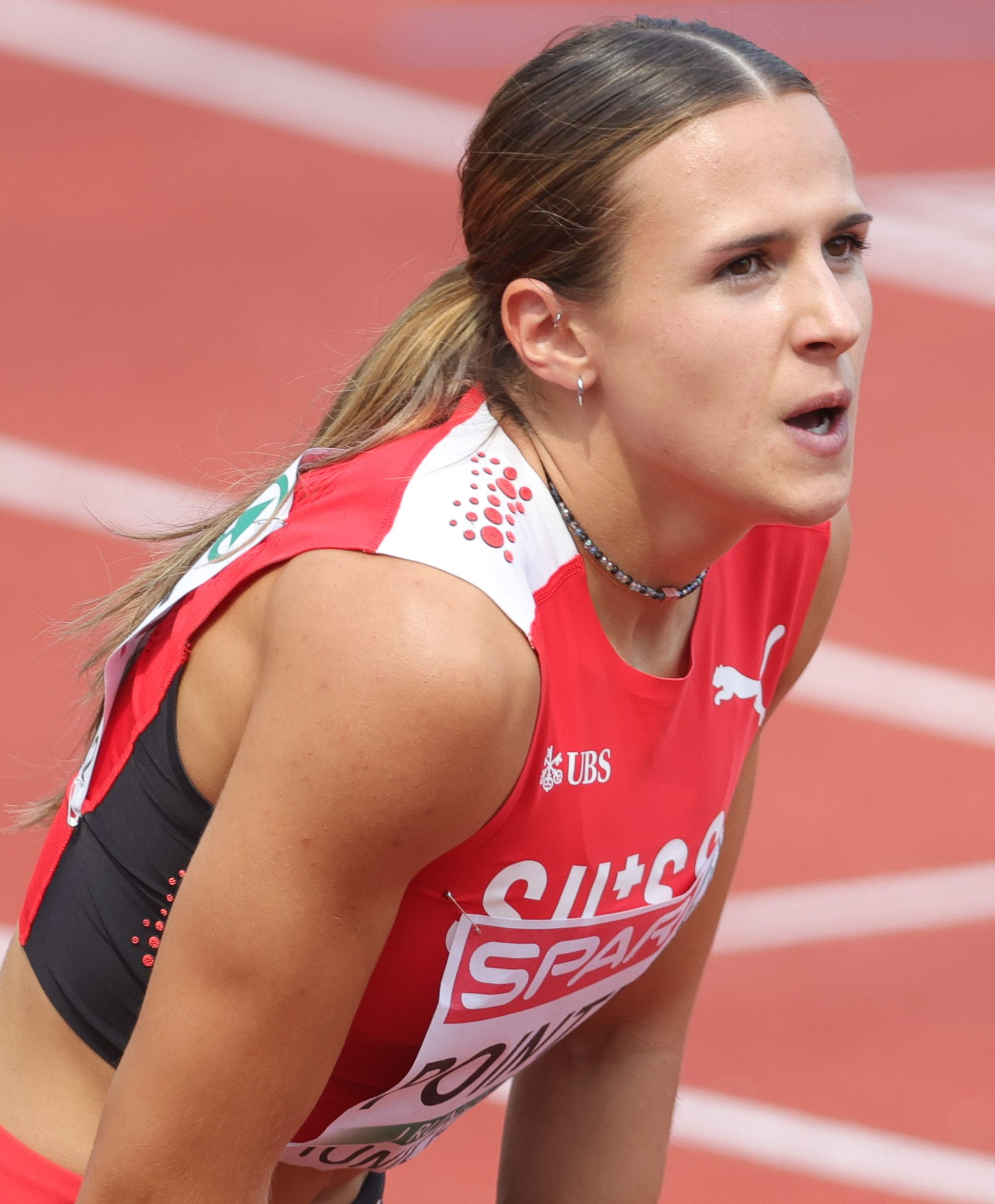
- Pointet in 2022

Personal information
- Nationality: Swiss
- Born: 17 February 2001 (age 25)

Sport
- Sport: Athletics
- Event: Sprint

Achievements and titles
- Personal bests: 200 m : 22.96 s (St Gallen, 2024)
Medal record
Women's athletics
Representing Switzerland
European Championships
| Silver medal – second place | 2026 Birmingham | 4 × 100 m relay |
European U23 Championships
| Bronze medal – third place | 2023 Espoo | 4 × 100 m relay |
World University Games
| Silver medal – second place | 2025 Bochum | 200 m |
| Silver medal – second place | 2025 Bochum | 4 × 100 m relay |

Léonie Pointet (born 17 February 2001) is a Swiss sprinter. She is a multiple-time national champion over 200 metres.

== Biography ==
In February 2022, she won her first Swiss indoor 200 metres title in Magglingen, running 23.74 seconds. She represented Switzerland at the 2022 European Athletics Championships in Munich.

In July 2023, she won her first outdoors 200 metres Swiss Championship title in Bellinzona, running 23.27 seconds. Later that month, she was a European Athletics U23 Championships bronze medallist in the 4 × 100 m relay in Espoo, Finland in July 2023. In August 2023, she set a personal best of 23.16 seconds competing in the 200 metres at the 2023 World Athletics Championships in Budapest, however she did not progress to the semi finals.

In February 2024, she won her second Swiss indoor 200 metres title in St Gallen, running 23.35 seconds.

She was selected for the Swiss team for the 2024 World Athletics Relays in Nassau, Bahamas. As part of the 4 × 100 m team she helped secure a place at the 2024 Paris Olympics. In May 2024, she set a new personal best running 22.96 seconds for the 200 m in St Gallen.

She competed in the individual 200 m and was a member of the Swiss 4 × 100 m relay team that ran at the 2024 European Athletics Championships in Rome in June 2024. She competed at the 2024 Summer Olympics in Paris over 200 metres. She also competed in the 4 × 100 m relay at the Games.

In February 2025, she won her third national indoor 200 metres title at the Swiss Indoor Athletics Championships in St. Gallen, running a time of 23.29 seconds. She competed at the 2025 World Athletics Relays in China in the Women's 4 × 100 metres relay in May 2025.

She won a silver medal at the 2025 Summer World University Games in the 200 metres in Bochum, Germany. She also won a silver medal at the Games in the wonen's 4 × 100 metres relay.

In September 2025, she competed in the 200 metres at the 2025 World Championships in Tokyo, Japan. She also ran in the women's 4 × 100 metres relay at the championships.

Pointet won the Swiss Indoor Championships over 60 metres on 1 March 2026, running 7.12 seconds in the final. In May, she ran at the 2026 World Athletics Relays in the women's 4 × 100 metres relay in Gaborone, Botswana. In August, she ran in the women's 4 × 100 metres relay at the 2026 European Athletics Championships in Birmingham, with the Swiss team winning the bronze medal in the final. She also competed in the women's 200 metres at the championships, reaching the semi-finals.

== Personal life ==
She is from Jongny in the canton of Vaud. She combines athletics with studying physiotherapy at University of Applied Sciences and Arts of Western Switzerland (HESAV) with her athletics commitments extending the completion of her bachelor's degree in Physiotherapy to six years instead of three.
