= Nana Adoma Owusu-Afriyie =

Australian sprinter

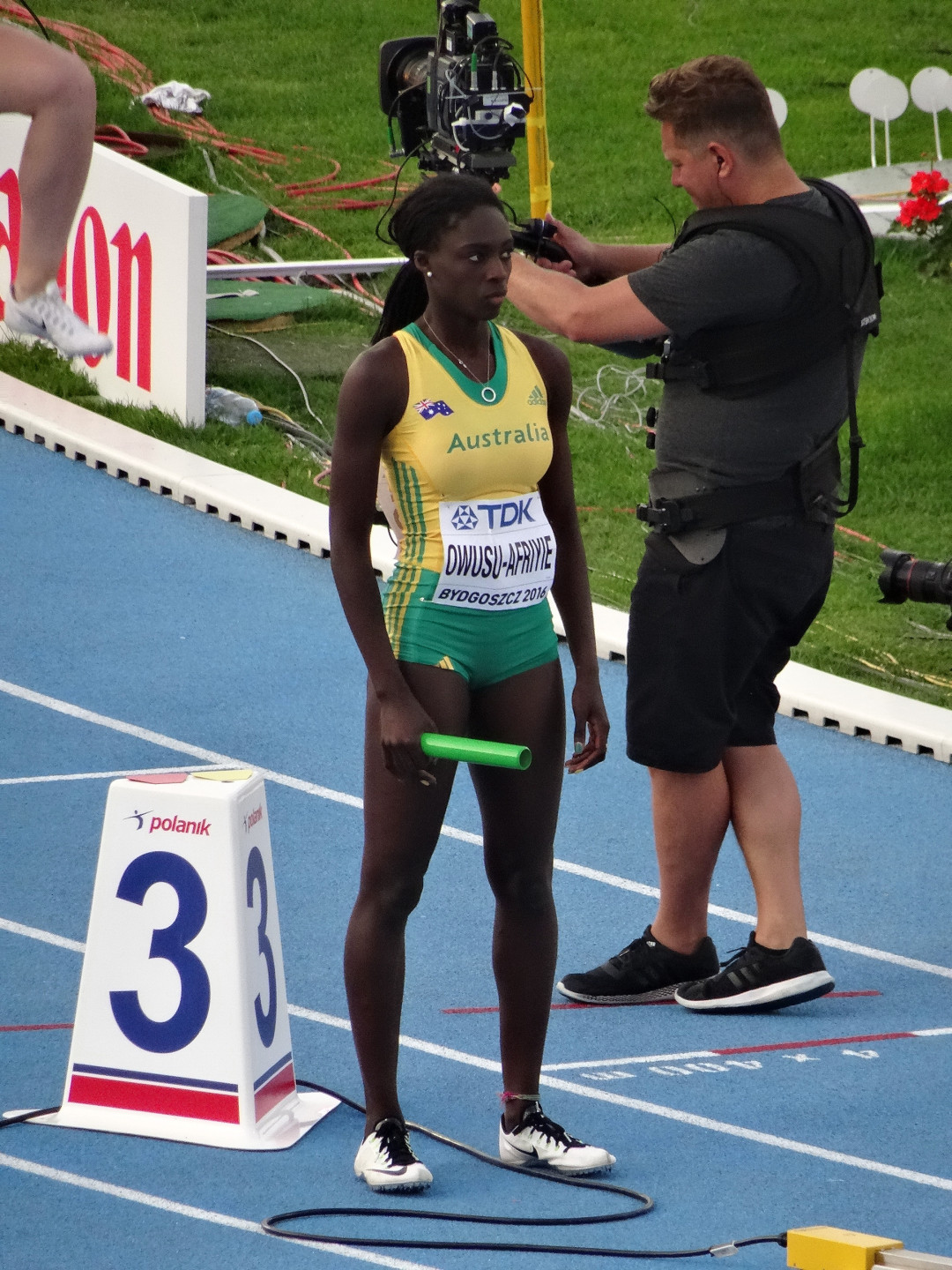
- Nana Adoma Owusu-Afriyie in 2016

Personal information
- Nationality: Australian
- Born: 22 March 1999 (age 27)

Sport
- Sport: Athletics
- Event: Sprinting
Medal record
Women's Athletics
Representing Australia
Oceania Championships
Gold medal – first place	2019 Townsville	4x100m relay
Bronze medal – third place	2019 Townsville	200m
Universiade
Silver medal – second place	2019 Naples	4x100m relay

Nana Adoma Owusu-Afriyie (born 22 March 1999) is an Australian athlete. She competed in the women's 4 × 100 metres relay event at the 2019 World Athletics Championships.

In August 2020, she was studying a Bachelor of Nutrition Science at Deakin University.
