= Vittoria Fontana =

Italian sprinter

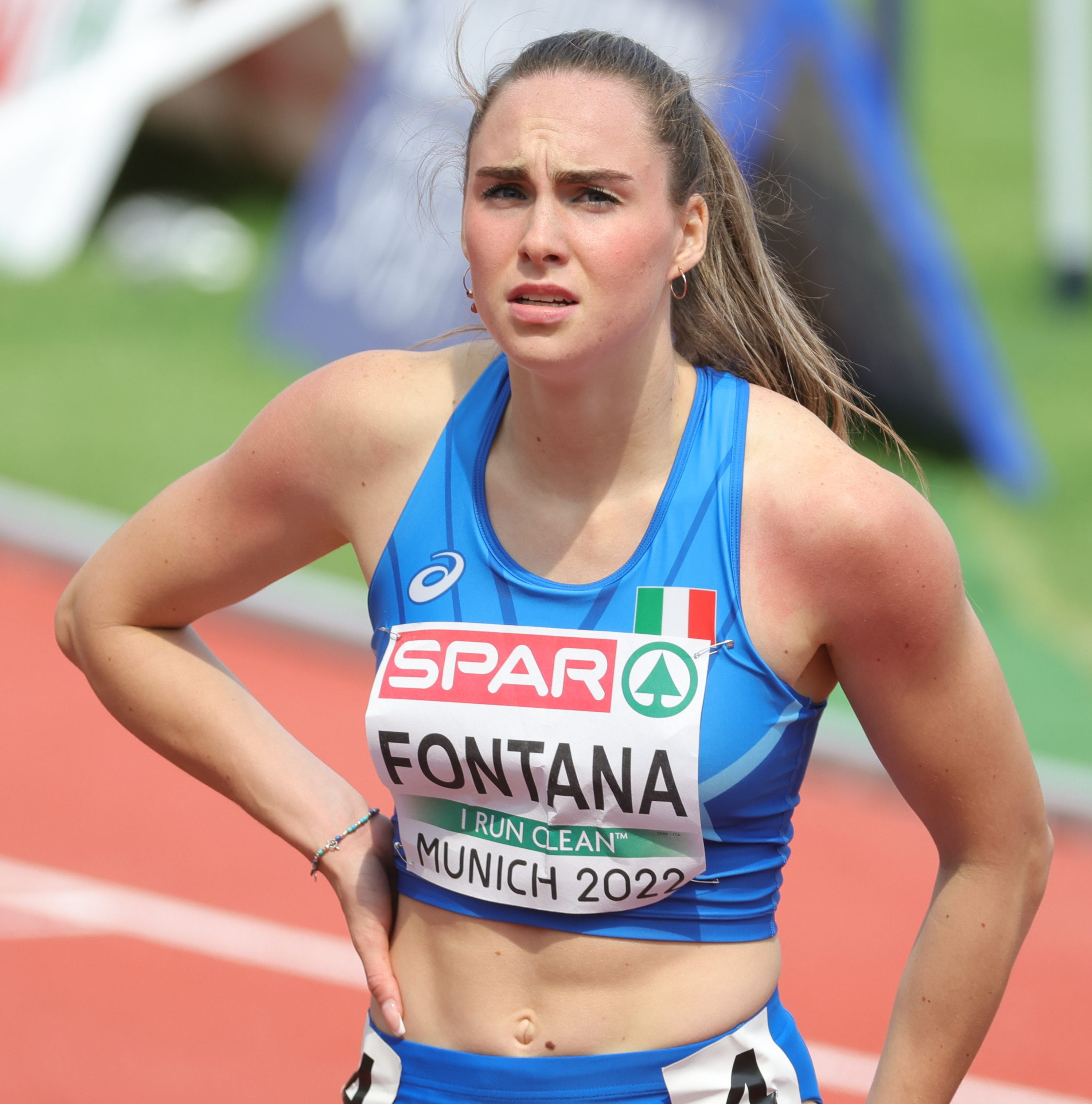
- Fontana in 2022

Personal information
- National team: Italy (1 cap)
- Born: 23 July 2000 (age 26) Gallarate, Italy
- Height: 1.76 m (5 ft 9 in)
- Weight: 63 kg (139 lb)

Sport
- Sport: Athletics
- Event: Sprint
- Club: C.S. Carabinieri; N.Atl. Fanfulla Lodigiana
- Coached by: Giuseppe Cappelletti

Achievements and titles
- Personal bests: 100 m: 11.33 (2021); 60 m indoor: 7.28 (2021)
Medal record
Women's athletics
Representing Italy
World Relays
Gold medal – first place	2021 Chorzów	4×100 m relay
World University Games
Gold medal – first place	2025 Bochum	200 m
Mediterranean Games
Gold medal – first place	2026 Taranto	200 m
Mediterranean U23 Championships
Silver medal – second place	2018 Jesolo	4×100 m relay
European U20 Championships
Gold medal – first place	2019 Borås	100 m

Vittoria Fontana (born 23 July 2000) is an Italian sprinter. She competed at the 2020 Summer Olympics, in 100 m.

== Personal best ==
- 100 m: 11.33 (Geneva, Switzerland, 12 June 2021)

== Achievements ==
Senior level

Year	Competition	Venue	Position	Event	Measure	Notes
2021	European Indoor Championships	(Poland) Toruń	Semifinal	60 m	7.28	PB
2021	World Relays	(Poland) Chorzów	1st	4×100 m relay	43.79	SB

== National titles ==
- Italian Athletics Indoor Championships
  - 60 metres: 2021

== See also ==
- Italian all-time top lists - 100 metres
