= Gina Akpe-Moses =

Irish sprinter

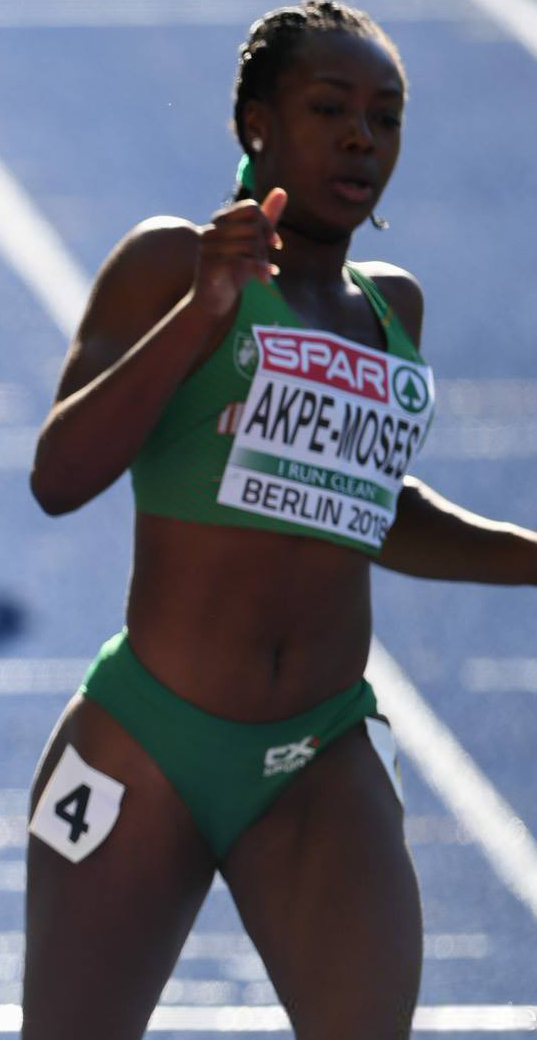
- Akpe-Moses at the 2018 European Athletics Championships

Personal information
- Nationality: Irish
- Born: 25 February 1999 (age 27) Lagos, Nigeria

Sport
- Sport: Athletics
- Event: 100 metres 200 metres
- Club: Blackrock AC & Birchfield Harriers
Medal record
Women's athletics
Representing Ireland
World U20 Championships
Silver medal – second place	2018 Tampere	4x100 m relay
European U20 Championships
Gold medal – first place	2017 Grosseto	100 m
European U18 Championships
Silver medal – second place	2016 Tbilisi	100 m
European U18 Olympic Festival
Silver medal – second place	2015 Tbilisi	200 m

Gina Akpe-Moses (born 25 February 1999 in Lagos, Nigeria) is an Irish athlete specialising as a sprinter. In 2017 she became the European junior champion over 100 metres, the first Irish woman to win a sprint gold medal at that level.

== Career ==
Arriving at the age of three in Dundalk, Gina Akpe-Moses started athletics at age 11 in St Gerard's AC, then specialised in sprinting. In 2014, she moved to Birmingham to join an elite British club. Her sister Precious Akpe-Moses is also a sprinter.

In 2015, a 16-year-old Akpe-Moses competed at the European Athletics Under-20 Championships in Eskilstuna, Sweden coming in fourth place as part of the women's 4 x 100 metres relay team. That same year, she won joint-silver medal in the 200 metres at the European Youth Summer Olympic Festival held in Tbilisi, Georgia.

She earned a silver in the 100 metres run at the 2016 European U18 Championships in Tbilisi.

In 2017, Akpe-Moses took gold for the 100 m at the European U20 Championships held in Grosseto, Italy and again came fourth in the 4 x 100 metres relay.

In 2018, she won silver as part of the women's 4 × 100 m Irish team at the World U20 Championships in Tampere, Finland, having also qualified for the final of the individual race.

== Personal bests ==
- 60 metres indoors – 7.37 (Kuldīga 2020)

- 100 metres – 11.45 (+1.2 m/s, Oordegem, Lede 2019)
- 200 metres – 23.86 (+0.4 m/s, Mannheim 2018)
