= Irish Indoor Athletics Championships =

Annual national indoor athletics championships for Ireland

- Sport: Indoor track and field
- Founded: 1988
- Country: Republic of Ireland, Northern Ireland
- Related competitions: Irish Athletics Championships

The Irish Indoor Athletics Championships, also known as the National Senior Indoor Championships, is an annual indoor track and field competition organised by Athletics Ireland, which serves as the Irish indoor national championship for the sport.

It was first organised in 1988 by the Bord Luthchleas na hEireann (Irish Athletic Board), which later folded into Athletics Ireland and made the competition an all-Ireland championships from 2000 onwards. Athletes from Northern Ireland are also eligible to compete at the British Indoor Athletics Championships.

Typically contested in mid February, the competition features championships for both men and women, with around 28 events divided equally between the sexes. The event has had a regular title sponsor, with Woodie's DIY serving from 2007-14, Irish Life from 2015-22 and 123.ie from 2023 onwards.

Since 2003, non-Irish athletes may participate as guests only, though non-Irish athletes may compete if they are members of an athletics club in the Republic of Ireland.

== Events ==
The following athletics events feature as standard on the Irish Indoor Championships programme:

- Sprint: 60 m, 200 m, 400 m
- Distance track events: 800 m, 1500 m, 3000 m
- Hurdles: 60 m hurdles
- Jumps: long jump, triple jump, high jump, pole vault
- Throws: shot put
- Racewalking: 5000 m (men), 3000 m (women)
- Combined events: heptathlon (men), pentathlon (women)

== Editions ==
Edition	Date	Location	Dates	Venue	Events	Sponsor	Notes	Reference
1	1988	Nenagh		Nenagh Arena	20			
2	1989	Nenagh		Nenagh Arena	20			
3	1990	Nenagh		Nenagh Arena	20			
4	1991	Nenagh		Nenagh Arena	29			
5	1992	Nenagh		Nenagh Arena	29			
6	1993	Nenagh		Nenagh Arena	29			
7	1994	Nenagh		Nenagh Arena	29			
8	1995	Nenagh		Nenagh Arena	29			
9	1996	Nenagh		Nenagh Arena	29			
10	1997	Nenagh		Nenagh Arena	29			
11	1998	Nenagh	14–15 February	Nenagh Arena	29			
12	1999	Nenagh	13–14 February	Nenagh Arena	29			
13	2000	Nenagh	12–13 February	Nenagh Arena	29			
14	2001	Nenagh	3–4 February	Nenagh Arena	29			
15	2002	Nenagh	16–17 February	Nenagh Arena	28			
16	2003	Belfast	15–16 February	Odyssey Arena	28			
17	2004	Belfast	14–15 February	Odyssey Arena	28			
18	2005	Nenagh	5–6 February	Nenagh Arena	29			
19	2006	Belfast	18–19 February	Odyssey Arena	28			
20	2007	Belfast	17–18 February	Odyssey Arena	28	Woodie's DIY		
21	2008	Belfast	26–27 January	Odyssey Arena	28	Woodie's DIY		
22	2009	Belfast	7–8 February	Odyssey Arena	28	Woodie's DIY		
23	2010	Belfast	6–7 February	Odyssey Arena	28	Woodie's DIY		
24	2011	Belfast	19–20 February	Odyssey Arena	28	Woodie's DIY		
25	2012	Belfast	11–12 February	Odyssey Arena	28	Woodie's DIY		
26	2013	Athlone	17–18 February	AIT International Arena	28	Woodie's DIY		
27	2014	Athlone	15–16 February	AIT International Arena	28	Woodie's DIY		
28	2015	Athlone	21–22 February	AIT International Arena	28	Irish Life Health		
29	2016	Athlone	27–28 February	AIT International Arena	28	Irish Life Health		
30	2017	Dublin	18–29 February	National Indoor Arena	28	Irish Life Health		
31	2018	Dublin	17–18 February	National Indoor Arena	28	Irish Life Health		
32	2019	Dublin	16–17 February	National Indoor Arena	28	Irish Life Health		
33	2020	Dublin	16–17 February	National Indoor Arena		Irish Life Health		
34	2021	Dublin		National Indoor Arena		Irish Life Health	Event cancelled due to Covid	
35	2022	Dublin	26–27 February	National Indoor Arena		Irish Life Health		
36	2023	Dublin	18–19 February	National Indoor Arena		123.ie		
37	2024	Dublin	17–18 February	National Indoor Arena		123.ie		
38	2025	Dublin	22–23 February	National Indoor Arena		123.ie		

== Venues ==
The Irish Indoor Championships has been held at four different venues during its lifetime. The Nenagh Arena in Nenagh has hosted the event the most, serving as host on sixteen occasions in an unbroken run from 1988 to 2002. It was the only indoor track and field stadium in the country during that time. The Odyssey Arena in Belfast became a regular host after that period, holding all but one of the championships from 2002 to 2012. The AIT International Arena in Athlone served as the host venue from 2012 to 2016.

Location	Venue	Venue Image	First hosted	Years hosted	Total hosts
Nenagh, Republic of Ireland	Nenagh Arena		1988	1988, 1989, 1990, 1991, 1992, 1993, 1994, 1995, 1996, 1997, 1998, 1999, 2000, 2001, 2002, 2005	16
Belfast, Northern Ireland	Odyssey Arena		2003	2003, 2004, 2006, 2007, 2008, 2009, 2010, 2011, 2012	9
Dublin, Republic of Ireland	National Indoor Arena		2017	2017, 2018, 2019, 2020, 2022, 2023, 2024, 2025	8
Athlone, Republic of Ireland	AIT International Arena		2013	2013, 2014, 2015, 2016	4

== Championships records ==
=== Men ===
Event	Record	Athlete/Team	Date	Place	Ref.
60 m	6.57 NR	Israel Olatunde	19 February 2023	Abbotstown	
3000 m walk	11:06.69 NR	Alex Wright	2 February 2019	Abbotstown	
5000 m walk	18:50.70 NR	Alex Wright	18 February 2017	Dublin	
