= Ciara Neville =

Irish sprinter

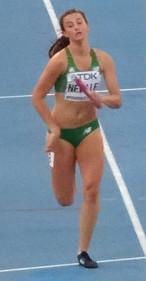
- Ciara Neville in 2016

Personal information
- Born: 14 October 1999 (age 27) Limerick, Ireland

Sport
- Sport: Athletics
- Event: 100 metres
- Club: Emerald AC

Ciara Neville (born 14 October 1999) is an Irish sprinter. In 2018, she won silver as part of the 4 × 100 m Irish team at the Youth World U-20 Championships in Tampere, Finland, and also qualified for the semifinal of the individual race. She represented her country at the 2017 European Indoor Championships reaching the semifinals.

== International competitions ==
Year	Competition	Venue	Position	Event	Notes
Representing Ireland
2015	European Junior Championships	Eskilstuna, Sweden	13th (sf)	100 m	12.06
2015	European Junior Championships	Eskilstuna, Sweden	4th	4 × 100 m relay	45.38
2015	European Youth Olympic Festival	Tbilisi, Georgia	1st	100 m	12.01
2016	World U20 Championships	Bydgoszcz, Poland	5th	4 × 100 m relay	44.82
2016	European Youth Championships	Tbilisi, Georgia	14th (sf)	100 m	12.02
2017	European Indoor Championships	Belgrade, Serbia	23rd (sf)	60 m	7.49
2017	European U20 Championships	Grosseto, Italy	7th	100 m	11.98
2018	World Indoor Championships	Birmingham, United Kingdom	37th (h)	60 m	7.47
2018	European Championships	Berlin, Germany	9th (h)	4 × 100 m relay	43.80
2019	World Relays	Yokohama, Japan	10th (h)	4 × 100 m relay	44.02
2019	European U23 Championships	Gävle, Sweden	5th	100 m	11.57
2019	European U23 Championships	Gävle, Sweden	4th	4 × 100 m relay	44.32
2021	European Indoor Championships	Toruń, Poland	20th (sf)	60 m	7.37
2026	World Indoor Championships	Toruń, Poland	31st (h)	60 m	7.31
2026	European Championships	Birmingham, United Kingdom	24th (sf)	100 m	11.57
2026	European Championships	Birmingham, United Kingdom	7th	4 × 100 m relay	44.18

== Personal bests ==
Outdoor

- 100 metres – 11.33(+1.0 m/s, Morton Stadium, IRL 2019)
- 200 metres – 23.60(+0.7 m/s, Oordegem, BEL 2019)

Indoor

- 60 metres – 7.30 (Athlone 2017)
- 200 metres – 24.01 (Athlone 2015)
