= 2025 World Athletics Relays – Women's 4 × 100 metres relay =

Women's 4 × 100 metres relay at the 2025 World Athletics Relays
- Venue: Tianhe Stadium, Guangzhou
- Dates: 10 May (heats); 11 May (repechage round & final)
- Winning time: 42.21

Medalists
gold medal	Nia Wedderburn-Goodison; Amy Hunt; Bianca Williams; Success Eduan; Asha Philip*; Desiree Henry*	Great Britain
silver medal	Esperança Cladera; Jaël Bestué; Paula Sevilla; María Isabel Pérez	Spain
bronze medal	Natasha Morrison; Shelly-Ann Fraser-Pryce; Tina Clayton; Shericka Jackson; Tia Clayton*	Jamaica

The women's 4 × 100 metres relay at the 2025 World Athletics Relays was held at the Tianhe Stadium in Guangzhou, China on 10 and 11 May.

The event served as a qualifying event for the 2025 World Athletics Championships, with the top 14 teams securing qualification to the World Championships.

== Records ==
Prior to the competition, the records were as follows:

Record	Team	Time	Location	Date
World record	United States (Tianna Madison, Allyson Felix, Bianca Knight, Carmelita Jeter)	40.82	London, United Kingdom	10 August 2012
Championships record	United States (Tamari Davis, Gabrielle Thomas, Celera Barnes, Melissa Jefferson)	41.85	(The Bahamas) Nassau, Bahamas	5 May 2024
2025 World Leading	(United States) USA Red (Tamari Davis Gabrielle Thomas, Jenna Prandini, Anavia Battle)	41.74	Austin, United States	29 March 2025

== Qualification ==
On 10 November 2024, World Athletics announced the qualification system for the championships. The top 16 teams in each event at the 2024 Summer Olympic Games qualify for entry to the championships. The host country China will enter with one team in each event, regardless of any entry conditions. The remaining teams (up to 32 in total per event) will be determined through the top lists in the qualification period (1 January 2024 to 13 April 2025).

== Program ==
All times are local (UTC+8).

Date	Time	Round
10 May 2025	20:03	Heats
11 May 2025	20:16	Repechage round
11 May 2025	21:16	Final

== Results ==
=== Heats (World Championships Qualifying Round 1) ===
The heats were held on 10 May 2025, starting at 20:03 (UTC+8) in the evening. Qualification: First 2 of each heat (WQ) plus 2 fastest times (Wq) qualify to the 2025 World Athletics Championships and World Athletics Relays Final. All teams that did not qualify moved on the repechage round, where they got a second chance to qualify for the World Championships.

==== Heat 1 ====
Rank	Lane	Nation	Competitors	Time	Notes
1	9	Belgium	Rani Vincke, Rani Rosius, Lien Torfs, Delphine Nkansa	42.80	WQ, SB
2	7	Great Britain	Asha Philip, Amy Hunt, Bianca Williams, Desiree Henry	42.92	WQ, SB
3	6	Australia	Georgia Harris, Bree Rizzo, Kristie Edwards, Thewbelle Philp	43.15	
4	8	France	Marie-Ange Rimlinger, Sarah Richard, Helene Parisot, Chloé Galet	43.29	SB
5	4	Chile	Anaís Hernández, María Ignacia Montt, Isidora Jiménez, Antonia Ramírez	43.64	NR
6	5	Ivory Coast	Dinedye Denis, Maboundou Koné, Lou Yonan Chantal Djehi, Dawa Ange Ella Klah	44.85	SB

==== Heat 2 ====
Rank	Lane	Nation	Competitors	Time	Notes
1	7	Spain	Esperança Cladera, Jaël Bestué, Paula Sevilla, María Isabel Pérez	42.18	WQ, NR
2	5	Jamaica	Tina Clayton, Shelly-Ann Fraser-Pryce, Tia Clayton, Shericka Jackson	42.51	WQ, SB
3	6	Germany	Sophia Junk, Nele Jaworski, Jessica-Bianca Wessolly, Rebekka Haase	42.98	Wq, SB
	4	Liberia	Ebony Morrison, Thelma Davies, Symone Darius, Destiny Smith-Barnett	DNF	
	8	Poland	Aleksandra Piotrowska, Magdalena Niemczyk, Magdalena Stefanowicz, Krystsina Tsimanouskaya	DQ	
	9	China	Chen Yuije, Li Yuting, Liang Xiaojing, Ge Manqi	DQ	

==== Heat 3 ====
Rank	Lane	Nation	Competitors	Time	Notes
1	5	United States	Mikiah Brisco, Caisja Chandler, Kayla White, Twanisha Terry	42.86	WQ
2	7	Canada	Sade McCreath, Marie-Éloïse Leclair, Catherine Léger, Audrey Leduc	43.11	WQ
3	9	Netherlands	Anne van de Wiel, Marije van Hunenstijn, Minke Bisschops, Britt de Blaauw	43.13	Wq, SB
4	6	Italy	Vittoria Fontana, Dalia Kaddari, Irene Siragusa, Alessia Pavese	43.30	SB
5	4	Portugal	Beatriz Andrade, Lorène Bazolo, Arialis Gandulla, Íris Silva	44.18	SB
	8	Switzerland	Mélissa Gutschmidt, Celine Burgi, Emma Van Camp, Léonie Pointet	DNF	

=== Repechage Round (World Championships Qualifying Round 2) ===
The repechage round was held on 11 May 2025, starting at 20:16 (UTC+8) in the evening. The repechage round consisted of all countries which did not qualify for the final. Qualification: First 3 of each heat qualify to the 2025 World Athletics Championships (WQ).

==== Heat 1 ====
Rank	Lane	Nation	Competitors	Time	Notes
1	7	France	Marie-Ange Rimlinger, Sarah Richard, Helene Parisot, Chloé Galet	43.08	WQ, SB
2	5	Italy	Vittoria Fontana, Dalia Kaddari, Irene Siragusa, Alessia Pavese	43.12	WQ, SB
3	8	Chile	Anaís Hernández, María Ignacia Montt, Isidora Jiménez, Antonia Ramírez	43.74	WQ
4	4	Portugal	Beatriz Andrade, Lorène Bazolo, Arialis Gandulla, Íris Silva	44.16	SB
	6	Ivory Coast	Dinedye Denis, Maboundou Koné, Lou Yonan Chantal Djehi, Dawa Ange Ella Klah	DNF	

==== Heat 2 ====
Rank	Lane	Nation	Competitors	Time	Notes
1	7	China	Chen Yuije, Li Yuting, Zhu Junying, Ge Manqi	43.03	WQ, SB
2	6	Switzerland	Mélissa Gutschmidt, Celine Burgi, Léonie Pointet, Emma Van Camp	43.35	WQ, SB
3	8	Poland	Aleksandra Piotrowska, Magdalena Niemczyk, Magdalena Stefanowicz, Krystsina Tsimanouskaya	43.38	WQ, SB
	5	Australia	Georgia Harris, Bree Rizzo, Kristie Edwards, Thewbelle Philp	DQ	

=== Final ===
The final was held on 11 May 2025, starting at 21:16 (UTC+8) in the evening.

Rank	Lane	Nation	Competitors	Time	Notes
1st place, gold medalist(s)	9	Great Britain	Nia Wedderburn-Goodison, Amy Hunt, Bianca Williams, Success Eduan	42.21	SB
2nd place, silver medalist(s)	7	Spain	Esperança Cladera, Jaël Bestué, Paula Sevilla, María Isabel Pérez	42.28	
3rd place, bronze medalist(s)	8	Jamaica	Natasha Morrison, Shelly-Ann Fraser-Pryce, Tina Clayton, Shericka Jackson	42.33	SB
4	6	United States	Mikiah Brisco, Caisja Chandler, Kayla White, Twanisha Terry	42.38	
5	4	Canada	Sade McCreath, Jacqueline Madogo, Marie-Éloïse Leclair, Audrey Leduc	42.46	NR
6	5	Belgium	Rani Vincke, Rani Rosius, Lien Torfs, Delphine Nkansa	42.85	
7	2	Netherlands	Anne van de Wiel, Marije van Hunenstijn, Minke Bisschops, Britt de Blaauw	43.21	
	3	Germany	Sophia Junk, Nele Jaworski, Jessica-Bianca Wessolly, Rebekka Haase	DNF	
