= 2026 World Athletics Relays – Women's 4 × 100 metres relay =

Women's 4 × 100 metres relay at the 2026 World Athletics Relays
- Venue: Botswana National Stadium, Gaborone
- Dates: 2 May (heats); 3 May (repechage round & final)
- Winning time: 42.00

Medalists
| gold medal | Briana Williams; Jodean Williams; Lavanya Williams; Elaine Thompson-Herah, Shericka Jackson*; Jonielle Smith* | Jamaica |
| silver medal | Sade McCreath; Audrey Leduc; Marie-Éloïse Leclair; Donna Ntambue | Canada |
| bronze medal | Lucia Carrillo; Jaël Bestué; Esperança Cladera; María Isabel Pérez | Spain |

The women's 4 × 100 metres relay at the 2026 World Athletics Relays was held at the Botswana National Stadium in Gaborone, Botswana on 2 and 3 May 2026.

The event will serve as a qualifying event for the 2027 World Athletics Championships in Beijing. In this context, the top 12 teams in each event will qualify for the World Championships.

== Records ==
Prior to the competition, the records were as follows:

| Record | Team | Time | Location | Date |
|---|---|---|---|---|
| World record | United States (Tianna Madison, Allyson Felix, Bianca Knight, Carmelita Jeter) | 40.82 | London, United Kingdom | 10 August 2012 |
| Championships record | United States (Tamari Davis, Gabrielle Thomas, Celera Barnes, Melissa Jefferson) | 41.85 | (The Bahamas) Nassau, Bahamas | 5 May 2024 |
| 2026 World Leading | (United States) USA White (Melissa Jefferson-Wooden, Anavia Battle, Kayla White, Sha'Carri Richardson) | 41.70 | Gainesville, United States | 18 April 2026 |

== Qualification ==
The top 8 teams in each event at the 2025 World Athletics Championships automatically qualify for entry to the championships. The remaining teams (up to 24 in total per event ) will be determined through the top lists in the qualification period from 1 January 2025 to 5 April 2026. Host country Botswana can enter with one team in each event, regardless of any entry conditions.

== Program ==
All times are local (UTC+2).

| Date | Time | Round |
|---|---|---|
| 2 May 2026 | 15:05 | Heats |
| 3 May 2026 | 15:30 | Repechage round |
| 3 May 2026 | 16:24 | Final |

== Results ==
=== Heats (World Championships Qualifying Round 1) ===
The heats were held on 2 May 2026, starting at 15:05 in the afternoon. Qualification: the first 2 of each heat (WQ) plus 2 fastest times (Wq) qualify to World Athletics Championships and World Athletics Relays Final.

==== Heat 1 ====
| Rank | Lane | Nation | Competitors | Time | Notes |
|---|---|---|---|---|---|
| 1 | 8 | Spain | Lucia Carrillo, Jaël Bestué, Esperança Cladera, María Isabel Pérez | 42.26 | WQ, SB |
| 2 | 5 | Canada | Sade McCreath, Audrey Leduc, Marie-Éloïse Leclair, Donna Ntambue | 42.39 | WQ, SB |
| 3 | 7 | Poland | Magdalena Niemczyk, Marlena Granaszewska, Magdalena Stefanowicz, Pia Skrzyszowska | 43.09 | Wq, SB |
| 4 | 6 | United States | Semira Killebrew, Jadyn Mays, Samirah Moody, Karimah Davis | 43.33 | |
| 5 | 2 | India | Tamanna, Nithva Gandhe, Sudeshna Shivankar, Sneha Sathyanarayana Shanuva | 43.97 | SB |
| | 4 | Australia | Ebony Lane, Torrie Lewis, Monique Hanlon, Georgia Harris | DQ | TR24.7 |
| | 3 | Ireland | Molly Scott, Ciara Neville, Mollie O'Reilly, Sarah Leahy | DQ | TR24.7 |

==== Heat 2 ====
| Rank | Lane | Nation | Competitors | Time | Notes |
|---|---|---|---|---|---|
| 1 | 4 | China | Liang Xiaojing, Liu Guoyi, Zhu Junying, Chen Yujie | 42.62 | WQ, SB |
| 2 | 5 | Italy | Alice Pagliarini, Gloria Hooper, Margherita Castellani, Zaynab Dosso | 42.94 | WQ, SB |
| 3 | 8 | Switzerland | Chloé Rabac, Fabienne Hoenke, Léonie Pointet, Céline Bürgi | 43.11 | SB |
| 4 | 2 | South Africa | Viwe Jingqi, Kyla La Grange, Gabriella Marais, Joviale Mbisha | 43.22 | SB |
| 5 | 6 | Netherlands | Anne van de Wiel, Britt de Blaauw, Isabel van den Berg, Fenna Achterberg | 43.28 | SB |
| 6 | 3 | Chile | Roxana Ramírez, María Montt, Antonia Ramirez, Belen Ituarte | 45.40 | |
| | 7 | Great Britain | Nia Wedderburn-Goodison, Imani-Lara Lansiquot, Success Eduan, Aleeya Sibbons | DQ | TR24.7 |

==== Heat 3 ====
| Rank | Lane | Nation | Competitors | Time | Notes |
|---|---|---|---|---|---|
| 1 | 6 | Jamaica | Shericka Jackson, Jodean Williams, Lavanya Williams, Jonielle Smith | 41.96 | WQ, SB |
| 2 | 7 | Germany | Sina Kammerschmitt, Rebekka Haase, Sophia Junk, Gina Lückenkemper | 42.44 | WQ, SB |
| 3 | 8 | Portugal | Lorène Bazolo, Tatjana Pinto, Beatriz Castelhano, Arialis Gandulla | 43.11 | Wq, NR |
| 4 | 2 | Botswana | Loungo Matlhaku, Boitshepiso Kelapile, Nancy Budzwani, Nono Kesego Kgari | 45.62 | |
| | 5 | Belgium | Camille Sonneville, Lotte Van Lent, Rani Vincke, Janie De Naeyer | DQ | TR24.7 |
| | 4 | France | Chloé Galet, Gémima Joseph, Hélène Parisot, Sarah Richard | DQ | TR24.7 |
| | 3 | Hungary | Zita Szentgyörgyi, Boglárka Takács, Luca Kozák, Anna Tóth | DQ | TR24.6 |
| | 1 | Nigeria | Chigozie Nwankwo, Obi Jennifer Chukwuka, Maria Thompson Omokwe, Miracle Ezechukwu | DQ | TR24.7 |

=== Repechage Round (World Championships Qualifying Round 2) ===
The repechage round was held on 3 May 2026, starting at 15:30 in the afternoon. Qualification: the first 2 of each heat (WQ) qualify to World Athletics Championships.

==== Heat 1 ====
| Rank | Lane | Nation | Competitors | Time | Notes |
|---|---|---|---|---|---|
| 1 | 6 | France | Lucie Jean Charles, Chloé Galet, Hélène Parisot, Sarah Richard | 42.92 | WQ, SB |
| 2 | 4 | Nigeria | Chigozie Nwankwo, Obi Jennifer Chukwuka, Maria Thompson Omokwe, Miracle Ezechukwu | 42.94 | WQ, SB |
| 3 | 7 | Hungary | Zita Szentgyörgyi, Boglárka Takács, Luca Kozák, Anna Tóth | 43.32 | NR |
| 4 | 3 | South Africa | Viwe Jingqi, Kyla La Grange, Gabriella Marais, Joviale Mbisha | 43.56 | |
| 5 | 5 | Belgium | Justine Goossens, Camille Sonneville, Rani Vincke, Janie De Naeyer | 43.59 | SB |
| 6 | 8 | India | Tamanna, Nithva Gandhe, Sudeshna Shivankar, Sneha Sathyanarayana Shanuva | 53.90 | |

==== Heat 2 ====
| Rank | Lane | Nation | Competitors | Time | Notes |
|---|---|---|---|---|---|
| 1 | 5 | Australia | Ebony Lane, Torrie Lewis, Monique Hanlon, Georgia Harris | 42.88 | WQ, SB |
| 2 | 4 | Great Britain | Renee Regis, Nia Wedderburn-Goodison, Aleeya Sibbons, Success Eduan | 42.90 | WQ, SB |
| 3 | 7 | Switzerland | Chloé Rabac, Fabienne Hoenke, Léonie Pointet, Céline Bürgi | 42.92 | SB |
| 4 | 6 | Ireland | Precious Akpe-Moses, Ciara Neville, Mollie O'Reilly, Sarah Leahy | 44.25 | SB |
| 5 | 8 | Chile | Roxana Ramírez, María Montt, Pilar Rodríguez, Belen Ituarte | 44.31 | SB |
| 6 | 3 | Netherlands | Anne van de Wiel, Britt de Blaauw, Fenna Achterberg, Demi van den Wildenberg | 44.41 | |
| 7 | 2 | Botswana | Loungo Matlhaku, Boitshepiso Kelapile, Nancy Budzwani, Same Amantle Mhutsiwa | 44.93 | SB |

=== Final ===
The final was held on 3 May 2026, starting at 16:25 in the afternoon

| Rank | Lane | Nation | Competitors | Time | Notes |
|---|---|---|---|---|---|
| 1st place, gold medalist(s) | 4 | Jamaica | Briana Williams, Jodean Williams, Lavanya Williams, Elaine Thompson-Herah | 42.00 | |
| 2nd place, silver medalist(s) | 5 | Canada | Sade McCreath, Audrey Leduc, Marie-Éloïse Leclair, Donna Ntambue | 42.17 | NR |
| 3rd place, bronze medalist(s) | 6 | Spain | Lucia Carrillo, Jaël Bestué, Esperança Cladera, María Isabel Pérez | 42.31 | |
| 4 | 3 | Italy | Alice Pagliarini, Gloria Hooper, Dalia Kaddari, Alessia Pavese | 42.61 | SB |
| 5 | 7 | China | Liang Xiaojing, Liu Guoyi, Zhu Junying, Chen Yujie | 42.61 | SB |
| 6 | 8 | Germany | Viola John, Rebekka Haase Jolina Ernst, Gina Lückenkemper | 42.61 | |
| 7 | 2 | Poland | Magdalena Stefanowicz, Marlena Granaszewska, Magdalena Niemczyk, Pia Skrzyszowska | 43.23 | |
| | 1 | Portugal | Lorène Bazolo, Tatjana Pinto, Beatriz Castelhano, Arialis Gandulla | DQ | |
