= 2025 World Athletics Championships – Women's 4 × 100 metres relay =

Women's 4 × 100 metres relay at the 2025 World Athletics Championships
- Venue: National Stadium
- Location: Tokyo, Japan
- Date: 20 September (heats); 21 September (final)
- Competitors: 67 from 16 nations
- Winning time: 41.75

Medalists
gold medal	Melissa Jefferson-Wooden; Twanisha Terry; Kayla White; Sha'Carri Richardson; Jacious Sears*	United States
silver medal	Shelly-Ann Fraser-Pryce; Tia Clayton; Tina Clayton; Jonielle Smith; Jodean Williams*	Jamaica
bronze medal	Sina Mayer; Rebekka Haase; Sophia Junk; Gina Lückenkemper	Germany

The women's 4 × 100 metres relay at the 2025 World Athletics Championships was held at the National Stadium in Tokyo on 20 and 21 September 2025.

== Records ==
Before the competition, records were as follows:

Record	Athlete & Nat.	Perf.	Location	Date
World record	United States; Tianna Madison, Allyson Felix, Bianca Knight, Carmelita Jeter	40.82	London, United Kingdom	10 August 2012
Championship record	United States; Tamari Davis, Twanisha Terry, Gabby Thomas, Sha'Carri Richardson	41.07	Budapest, Hungary	26 August 2023
World Leading	Great Britain; Dina Asher-Smith, Amy Hunt, Desiree Henry, Daryll Neita	41.69	London, United Kingdom	19 July 2025
African Record	Ivory Coast; Murielle Ahouré-Demps, Marie Josée Ta Lou-Smith, Jessika Gbai, Maboundou Koné	41.90	Budapest, Hungary	25 August 2023
Asian Record	(China) Sichuan; Lin Xiao, Li Yali, Liu Xiaomei, Li Xuemei	42.23	Shanghai, China	23 October 1997
European Record	East Germany; Silke Möller, Sabine Rieger, Ingrid Auerswald, Marlies Göhr	41.37	Canberra, Australia	6 October 1985
North, Central American and Caribbean record	United States; Tianna Madison, Allyson Felix, Bianca Knight, Carmelita Jeter	40.82	London, United Kingdom	10 August 2012
Oceanian record	Australia; Ella Connolly, Bree Masters, Kristie Edwards, Torrie Lewis	42.48	London, United Kingdom	20 July 2024
South American Record	Brazil; Evelyn dos Santos, Ana Claudia Lemos, Franciela Krasucki, Rosângela Santos	42.29	Moscow, Russia	18 August 2013

== Qualification standard ==
First fourteen placed teams at the 2025 World Athletics Relays and the next two highest placed team on year top list.

== Schedule ==
The event schedule, in local time (UTC+9), is as follows:

Date	Time	Round
20 September	20:45	Heats
21 September	21:06	Final

== Results ==
=== Heats ===
The heats took place on 20 September. The first three teams in each heat ( Q ) and the next two fastest ( q ) qualified for the final.

==== Heat 1 ====
Place	Lane	Nation	Athletes	Time	Notes
1	7	Jamaica	Jodean Williams, Tia Clayton, Tina Clayton, Jonielle Smith	41.80	Q, SB
2	5	Spain	Esperança Cladera, Jaël Bestué, Paula Sevilla, María Isabel Pérez	42.53	Q
3	9	France	Marie-Ange Rimlinger, Sarah Richard, Helene Parisot, Gémima Joseph	42.71	Q, SB
4	6	Netherlands	Isabel van den Berg, Britt de Blaauw, Marije van Hunenstijn, Demi van den Wildenberg	43.62	
5	2	Chile	Macarena Borie, María Ignacia Montt, Isidora Jiménez, Anaís Hernández	44.07	
6	4	Italy	Vittoria Fontana, Gloria Hooper, Dalia Kaddari, Alessia Pavese	49.41	
—	3	Australia	Ella Connolly, Bree Rizzo, Kristie Edwards, Torrie Lewis	DNF	
—	8	Belgium	Rani Vincke, Rani Rosius, Janie De Naeyer, Delphine Nkansa	DQ	TR24.7[L]

==== Heat 2 ====
Place	Lane	Nation	Athletes	Time	Notes
1	5	United States	Jacious Sears, Twanisha Terry, Kayla White, Sha'Carri Richardson	41.60	Q, WL
2	8	Germany	Sina Mayer, Rebekka Haase, Sophia Junk, Gina Lückenkemper	41.86	Q, SB
3	7	Great Britain & N.I.	Dina Asher-Smith, Success Eduan, Desiree Henry, Daryll Neita	41.88	Q
4	6	Canada	Sade McCreath, Jacqueline Madogo, Marie-Éloïse Leclair, Audrey Leduc	42.38	q, NR
5	3	Poland	Magdalena Niemczyk, Pia Skrzyszowska, Krystsina Tsimanouskaya, Ewa Swoboda	42.83	q, SB
6	4	China	Liang Xiaojing, Li Yuting, Zhu Junying, Chen Yujie	42.94	SB
7	2	Ivory Coast	Dinedye Denis, Maboundou Koné, Jessika Gbai, Lou Yonan Chantal Djehi	44.64	
—	9	Switzerland	Géraldine Frey, Céline Bürgi, Léonie Pointet, Ajla Del Ponte	DNF	

=== Final ===
Place	Lane	Nation	Athletes	Time	Notes
1st place, gold medalist(s)	5	United States	Melissa Jefferson-Wooden, Twanisha Terry, Kayla White, Sha'Carri Richardson	41.75	
2nd place, silver medalist(s)	6	Jamaica	Shelly-Ann Fraser-Pryce, Tia Clayton, Tina Clayton, Jonielle Smith	41.79	SB
3rd place, bronze medalist(s)	8	Germany	Sina Mayer, Rebekka Haase, Sophia Junk, Gina Lückenkemper	41.87	
4	4	Great Britain & N.I.	Dina Asher-Smith, Amy Hunt, Desiree Henry, Daryll Neita	42.07	
5	7	Spain	Esperança Cladera, Jaël Bestué, Paula Sevilla, María Isabel Pérez	42.47	
6	9	France	Marie-Ange Rimlinger, Sarah Richard, Helene Parisot, Gémima Joseph	42.81	
7	2	Canada	Sade McCreath, Jacqueline Madogo, Marie-Éloïse Leclair, Audrey Leduc	42.82	
—	3	Poland	Magdalena Niemczyk, Pia Skrzyszowska, Krystsina Tsimanouskaya, Ewa Swoboda	DQ	TR24.7[L]
