= Bianca Williams =

British athlete (born 1993)

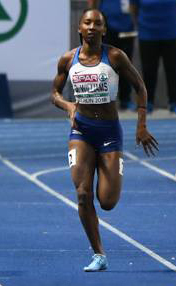
- Williams in 2018

Personal information
- Born: 18 December 1993 (age 32) Enfield, London, United Kingdom
- Education: University of East London
- Height: 1.67 m (5 ft 6 in)
- Weight: 57 kg (126 lb)

Sport
- Club: Enfield & Haringey AC
- Coached by: Lloyd Cowan
Medal record
Women's athletics
Representing Great Britain
Olympic Games
Silver medal – second place	2024 Paris	4 × 100 m relay
World Championships
Bronze medal – third place	2023 Budapest	4 × 100 m relay
World Relays
Gold medal – first place	2025 Guangzhou	4 × 100 m relay
Silver medal – second place	2014 Nassau	4 × 200 m relay
Bronze medal – third place	2015 Nassau	4 × 100 m relay
Bronze medal – third place	2024 Nassau	4 × 100 m relay
European Championships
Gold medal – first place	2018 Berlin	4 × 100 m relay
Silver medal – second place	2016 Amsterdam	4 × 100 m relay
European Games
Bronze medal – third place	2023 Kraków-Małopolska	200 m
Representing Europe
Continental Cup
Silver medal – second place	2018 Ostrava	4 × 100 m relay
Representing England
Commonwealth Games
Gold medal – first place	2018 Gold Coast	4 × 100 m relay
Gold medal – first place	2022 Birmingham	4 × 100 m relay
Bronze medal – third place	2014 Glasgow	200 m
Bronze medal – third place	2014 Glasgow	4 × 100 m relay

Bianca Williams (born 18 December 1993) is a British athlete. She won the silver medal in the women's 4 × 100 metres relay at the 2024 Summer Olympics.

She competed for England at the 2014 Commonwealth Games, where she won bronze medals in the 200 m, and in the 4 × 100 m relay. She has also won two medals as part of the British team at the IAAF World Relays; with silver in the 4 × 200 m in 2014, and bronze in the 4 × 100 m in 2015. She ranks fifth on the UK all-time list at 200 m with her best of 22.45 secs.

Williams was one of a series of British female youth sprinters to appear on the world stage in the 2010s, along with Jodie Williams, Ashleigh Nelson, Desirèe Henry, Dina Asher-Smith and Asha Philip, later supplemented in the 2020s by Daryll Neita, Imani Lansiquot and Amy Hunt. Predominantly a relay athlete, she paused her career to have her first child in 2020, aged 26. She returned a few years later in 2022 to renewed individual form, setting a lifetime best in her favoured event in 2023, and competing in the individual 200 metres at the 2024 Summer Olympics.

Domestically, Williams in 2025, at the age of 31, won her first national title, indoors over 60 metres.

In November 2023, Williams was named in the BBC's 100 Women list, which features 100 inspiring and influential women from around the world.

== Career ==
In 2014, Williams won a bronze medal at the World Relays in the 4 × 200 m relay. In June, she ran a new 200 m personal best of 22.79 s in finishing second at the Golden Spike Ostrava. Williams competed at the 2014 Commonwealth Games in Glasgow, winning bronze medals in the 200 m and 4 × 100 m relay and finishing sixth in the 100 m. She also competed at the 2014 European Championships, finishing fourth over 200 m.

The following year, at the World Relays, Williams won a bronze medal at the 4 × 100 m relay. At the European Team Championships in Cheboksary, she finished second in the 200 m. In August, she competed at the World Championships in Beijing, making it to the semi-finals of the 200 m.

Williams won a silver medal in the 4 × 100 m relay at the 2016 European Championships. She competed at the 2017 World Championships in London, making the semi-finals of the 200 m.

In 2018, Williams reached the semi-finals of the 60 m World Indoor Championships in Birmingham, running a new personal best of 7.26 s. At the 2018 Commonwealth Games, held on the Gold Coast, she finished sixth over 200 m and won gold in the 4 × 100 m relay. In July, Williams competed at the Athletics World Cup in London, where she won a gold medal in the 4 × 100 m relay and finished fourth in the 100 m. Williams also competed at the European Championships, where she won a gold medal in the 4 × 100 m relay and finished sixth in the 200 m.

Williams won a silver medal in the 4 × 100 m relay at the 2022 Commonwealth Games in Birmingham, before being upgraded to gold due to a doping violation. In 2023, Williams captained the British team at the European Team Championships First Division, as they finished fifth with Williams running her fastest 200 m in five years to finish second in that event in 22.75 s. She ran 22.59 s, only 0.01 s off of her personal best, over the distance to finish second at the British Championships behind Daryll Neita. At the World Championships in Budapest, Williams reached the semi-finals in the 200 m, running a new personal best of 22.45 s. She went onto win a bronze medal as part of the 4 × 100 m relay team, alongside her teammates Asha Philip, Imani Lansiquot and Daryll Neita.

In 2024, Williams was part of the British team at the World Relays, winning a bronze medal in the 4 × 100 m relay. In July, she was officially selected for her first Olympics as part of Great Britain's Olympic team. At the Games in Paris, Williams made it to the semi-finals of the 200 m and won a silver medal after running in the heats of the 4 × 100 m relay.

Williams improved her seven-year old 60 m personal best of 7.26 s by running 7.21 s to win at the ISTAF Indoor Düsseldorf on 9 February 2025. She won her first national title at the 2025 British Indoor Championships, winning over 60 m in a time of 7.19 s. On 28 February, she lowered her personal best again to 7.16 s at the Villa de Madrid Indoor Meeting. At the European Indoor Championships in Apeldoorn, Williams made the semi-finals of the 60 m, running 7.17 s.

Williams was a member of the Great Britain team which won gold in the women's 4 × 100 metres at the World Athletics Relays on 11 May 2025.

== Personal life ==
Williams lives in Maida Vale and in addition to her track career, works as a part-time tennis coach. She is in a relationship with the Portuguese sprinter Ricardo dos Santos with whom she has a son, born in 2020.

=== 2020 police incident ===
On 4 July 2020, Williams and dos Santos accused the Metropolitan Police of racial profiling after having their car stopped and searched whilst returning from a training session. Williams uploaded a video of them both being detained and searched. After the incident occurred, Linford Christie shared Williams' video of the incident on Twitter, with the comment "Racist police aren't just in America #BLM". Williams subsequently spoke with The Times and accused the police of racial profiling and acting violently towards her family. Keir Starmer said on LBC that senior Met officers should feel “very uncomfortable” about the force's handling of the case.

The Met released a statement, saying the vehicle Williams was travelling in had been on the wrong side of the road, and that the driver had sped off when asked to stop. They also said the Directorate of Professional Standards had reviewed footage from social media and officers' bodycams, and were satisfied there was no concern around the officers' conduct involved in the incident. On 7 July 2020, the Met voluntarily referred the incident to the Independent Office for Police Conduct, for independent investigation into the incident. Additionally, they stated that they were now treating the matter as a 'public complaint'.

On 1 July 2021, it was announced that three of the six officers involved were under investigation for gross misconduct. In January 2023, it was reported that five officers were to face a gross misconduct hearing, and that an investigator at the IOPC resigned in November 2020, complaining that her investigation of the incident had been "watered down". The disciplinary hearing against the five officers, who deny the allegations, began on 18 September 2023. Two of the five officers were found guilty of gross misconduct in that they had lied about smelling cannabis. None of the officers were found guilty of misconduct in relation to the stopping of the vehicle, or the handcuffing of the couple. The two officers found guilty of gross misconduct were dismissed. The police misconduct panel who considered the 2020 incident deemed Williams to be 'a credible and thoughtful witness' who had clearly been deeply affected by the incident. After the officers were sacked, a crowdfunding page was set up for the officers' benefit. As at 30 October 2023, more than £140,000 had been raised for them. Williams said she was "shocked with the amount of money that’s been raised".

On 4 October 2024, the Police Appeals Tribunal overturned the gross misconduct outcome and reinstated the jobs of the two officers as well as ordering they receive back pay.

=== Driving ban ===
On 4 December 2023, Magistrates imposed on Williams a six-month driving ban, 18 points on her driving licence and fines, surcharges and costs totalling £471. Williams pleaded guilty to failing on three separate occasions to advise the police, in writing, who it was that had been driving her Tesla Model 3 car. The vehicle was alleged to have been involved in an incident earlier in the year. The athlete told the court that she wasn't the driver at the time of the alleged incident and that imposing a ban may jeopardise her chances of qualifying for the 2024 Olympic Games. Williams told the Court she would have difficulty attending her training sessions if she had to rely on public transport. Following her guilty-plea, Williams' suspended driving licence has an accumulated total of 29 penalty points.

== Athletic achievements ==
=== Personal bests ===
Type	Distance	Time (s)	Wind (m/s)	Venue	Date	Notes
Individual events
Outdoor	100 metres	11.17	+1.0	Geneva, Switzerland	14 June 2014	
Outdoor	200 metres	22.45	-0.2	Budapest, Hungary	24 August 2023	
Outdoor	400 metres	54.34	—N/a	Rovereto, Italy	29 August 2017	
Indoor	60 metres	7.16	—N/a	Madrid, Spain	28 February 2025	
Indoor	200 metres sh	23.96	—N/a	Sheffield, United Kingdom	10 February 2013	
Team events
Outdoor	4 × 100 metres relay	41.88	—N/a	Berlin, Germany	12 August 2018	
Outdoor	4 × 200 metres relay	1:29.61	—N/a	Nassau, The Bahamas	25 May 2014	

=== International competitions ===
Representing Great Britain & England
Year	Competition	Venue	Position	Event	Time
2011	European Junior Championships	Tallinn, Estonia	3rd	4 × 100 m relay	45.00
2013	European U23 Championships	Tampere, Finland	—	200 m	DNF
2014	World Relays	Nassau, The Bahamas	5th	4 × 100 m relay	42.75
2014	World Relays	Nassau, The Bahamas	2nd	4 × 200 m relay	1:29.61
2014	Commonwealth Games	Glasgow, United Kingdom	6th	100 m	11.31
2014	Commonwealth Games	Glasgow, United Kingdom	3rd	200 m	22.58
2014	Commonwealth Games	Glasgow, United Kingdom	3rd	4 × 100 m relay	43.10
2014	European Championships	Zürich, Switzerland	4th	200 m	22.68
2015	World Relays	Nassau, The Bahamas	3rd	4 × 100 m relay	42.84
2015	European Team Championships Super League	Cheboksary, Russia	11th	4 × 100 m relay	44.68
2015	European Team Championships Super League	Cheboksary, Russia	2nd	200 m	23.16
2015	World Championships	Beijing, China	13th	200 m	22.87
2015	World Championships	Beijing, China	4th	4 × 100 m relay	42.10
2016	European Championships	Amsterdam, Netherlands	2nd	4 × 100 m relay	42.45
2017	World Championshops	London, United Kingdom	21st	200 m	23.40
2018	World Indoor Championships	Birmingham, United Kingdom	17th	60 m	7.26
2018	Commonwealth Games	Gold Coast, Australia	6th	200 m	23.06
2018	Commonwealth Games	Gold Coast, Australia	1st	4 × 100 m relay	42.46
2018	World Cup	London, United Kingdom	4th	100 m	11.25
2018	World Cup	London, United Kingdom	1st	4 × 100 m relay	42.52
2018	European Championships	Berlin, Germany	6th	200 m	22.88
2018	European Championships	Berlin, Germany	1st	4 × 100 m relay	41.88
2018	Continental Cup	Ostrava, Czech Republic	2nd	4 × 100 m relay	42.55
2019	European Team Championships Super League	Bydgoszcz, Poland	3rd	4 × 100 m relay	43.46
2021	European Team Championships Super League	Chorzów, Poland	1st	4 × 100 m relay	43.36
2022	Commonwealth Games	Birmingham, United Kingdom	1st	4 × 100 m relay	42.41
2022	European Championships	Munich, Germany	—	4 × 100 m relay	DNF
2023	European Team Championships First Division	Chorzów, Poland	6th	100 m	11.29
2023	European Team Championships First Division	Chorzów, Poland	2nd	200 m	22.75
2023	European Games	Chorzów, Poland	3rd	200 m	22.75
2023	World Championships	Budapest, Hungary	11th	200 m	22.67
2023	World Championships	Budapest, Hungary	3rd	4 × 100 m relay	41.97
2024	World Relays	Nassau, The Bahamas	3rd	4 × 100 m relay	42.80
2024	Olympic Games	Paris, France	10th	200 m	22.58
2024	Olympic Games	Paris, France	2nd	4 × 100 m relay	41.85
2025	European Indoor Championships	Apeldoorn, Netherlands	10th	60 m	7.17
2025	World Relays	Guangzhou, China	1st	4 × 100 m relay	42.21

=== National championships and competitions ===
Year	Competition	Venue	Position	Event	Time
2010	England Indoor Championships, U17 events	Birmingham	—	60 m	DNS
2011	England Indoor Championships, U20 events	Birmingham	8th	60 m	7.83
2011	England Indoor Championships, U20 events	Birmingham	—	200 m	25.05
2011	England Championships, U20 events	Bedford	4th	100 m	11.66
2011	England Championships, U20 events	Bedford	—	200 m	DQ
2011	British Championships	Birmingham	—	100 m	12.12
2011	British Championships	Birmingham	—	200 m	24.65
2012	England Indoor Championships, U20 events	Birmingham	3rd	200 m	24.87
2013	British Indoor Championships	Sheffield	—	60 m	7.48
2013	British Indoor Championships	Sheffield	4th	200 m	24.15
2013	England Championships, U23 events	Bedford	3rd	100 m	11.53
2013	England Championships, U23 events	Bedford	2nd	200 m	23.37
2014	British Indoor Championships	Sheffield	6th	60 m	7.44
2014	British Championships	Birmingham	—	100 m	DQ
2014	British Championships	Birmingham	2nd	200 m	22.88
2015	British Championships	Birmingham	2nd	100 m	11.43
2015	British Championships	Birmingham	2nd	200 m	23.56
2016	British Championships	Birmingham	6th	200 m	24.23
2017	British Championships	Birmingham	4th	100 m	11.47
2017	British Championships	Birmingham	2nd	200 m	23.05
2018	British Indoor Championships	Birmingham	3rd	60 m	7.28
2018	British Championships	Birmingham	3rd	100 m	11.20
2018	British Championships	Birmingham	2nd	200 m	22.60
2021	British Championships	Manchester	—	100 m	11.79
2021	British Championships	Manchester	6th	200 m	23.49
2022	British Indoor Championships	Birmingham	4th	60 m	7.35
2023	British Indoor Championships	Birmingham	5th	60 m	7.34
2023	British Championships	Manchester	3rd	100 m	11.29
2023	British Championships	Manchester	2nd	200 m	22.59
2024	British Indoor Championships	Birmingham	2nd	60 m	7.30
2024	British Championships	Manchester	7th	200 m	23.26
2025	British Indoor Championships	Birmingham	1st	60 m	7.19
