= 2024 World Athletics Relays – Women's 4 × 100 metres relay =

Women's 4 × 100 metres relay at the 2024 World Athletics Relays
- Venue: Thomas Robinson Stadium, Nassau, Bahamas
- Dates: 4 May (heats) & 5 May (repechage, final)

Medalists
gold medal	Tamari Davis; Gabrielle Thomas; Celera Barnes; Melissa Jefferson	United States
silver medal	Chloé Galet; Gémima Joseph; Hélène Parisot; Mallory Leconte	France
bronze medal	Alyson Bell; Amy Hunt; Bianca Williams; Aleeya Sibbons	Great Britain

The women's 4 × 100 metres relay at the 2024 World Athletics Relays has been held at the Thomas Robinson Stadium on 4 and 5 May.

== Records ==
Prior to the competition, the records were as follows:

World record	United States (Tianna Madison, Allyson Felix, Bianca Knight, Carmelita Jeter)	40.82	London, United Kingdom	10 Aug 2012
Championships record	United States (Tianna Bartoletta, Alexandria Anderson, Jeneba Tarmoh, LaKeisha Lawson)	41.88	(The Bahamas) Nassau, Bahamas	24 May 2014
World Leading	United States USA Red (Mikiah Brisco, Abby Steiner, Jenna Prandini, Aleia Hobbs)	41.94	Gainesville, Florida, United States	22 March 2024

== Program ==
- Heats: Saturday 4 May 2024, 19:53
- Repechage: Sunday 5 May 2024, 19:40
- Final: Sunday 5 May 2024, 21:50

== Results ==
KEY:	Q	Qualified	q	Qualified as fastest times	WL	World leading	NR	National record	SB	Seasonal best	OG	2024 Olympic Games qualification

=== Heats ===
The top two per heat earned automatic Olympic qualification and advancement to the finals. All other teams had a second chance at Olympic qualification in the repechage round the following day.

Women's 4x100 Metres Relay Olympic Qualifying Round 1 - Heat
Place	Athlete	Country	Time	Heat
1	Tamari Davis; Gabrielle Thomas; Celera Barnes; Melissa Jefferson	United States	42.21	1
2	Asha Philip; Imani-Lara Lansiquot; Bianca Williams; Amy Hunt	Great Britain	42.33	4
3	Louise Wieland; Lisa Mayer; Gina Lückenkemper; Rebekka Haase	Germany	42.72	3
4	Krystsina Tsimanouskaya; Monika Romaszko; Magdalena Stefanowicz; Ewa Swoboda	Poland	42.81	2
5	Ebony Lane; Bree Masters; Ella Connolly; Torrie Lewis	Australia	42.83	3
6	Murielle Ahouré-Demps; Jessika Gbai; Maboundou Koné; Marie-Josée Ta Lou	Ivory Coast	42.83	3
7	Sonia Molina-Prados; Jaël Bestué; Paula Sevilla; María Isabel Pérez	Spain	42.85	3
8	N'Ketia Seedo; Marije van Hunenstijn; Minke Bisschops; Tasa Jiya	Netherlands	42.88	4
9	Sade McCreath; Marie-Éloise Leclair; Audrey Leduc; Crystal Emmanuel	Canada	42.98	2
10	Liang Xiaojing; Ge Manqi; Yuan Qiqi; Li Yuting	China	43.03	2
11	Zaynab Dosso; Dalia Kaddari; Anna Bongiorni; Alessia Pavese	Italy	43.08	2
12	Orlann Oliere; Gémima Joseph; Hélène Parisot; Mallory Leconte	France	43.09	1
13	Ebony Morrison; Destiny Smith-Barnett; Maia McCoy; Symone Darius	Liberia	43.15	4
14	Justina Tiana Eyakpobeyan; Favour Ofili; Olayinka Olajide; Tima Godbless	Nigeria	43.15	1
15	Devynne Charlton; Camille Rutherford; Charisma Taylor; Printassia Johnson	Bahamas	43.17	4
16	Taejha Badal; Michelle-Lee Ahye; Reese Webster; Leah Bertrand	Trinidad and Tobago	43.22	4
17	Géraldine Frey; Salomé Kora; Léonie Pointet; Sarah Atcho	Switzerland	43.29	1
18	Jodean Williams; Tia Clayton; Alana Reid; Remona Burchell	Jamaica	43.33	2
19	Jusztina Csóti; Anna Kocsis; Boglárka Takács; Alexa Sulyán	Hungary	43.66	4
20	Aimara Nazareno; Anahí Suárez; Nicole Caicedo; Ángela Tenorio	Ecuador	43.67	3
21	Gabriela Mourão; Ana Azevedo; Lorraine Martins; Vitória Cristina Rosa	Brazil	43.82	1
22	Marlet Ospino; Angélica Gamboa; Laura Martínez; Natalia Linares	Colombia	44.12	1
23	Manaka Miura; Remi Tsuruta; Shuri Aono; Aiha Yamagata	Japan	44.16	1
24	Anaís Hernández; María Ignacia Montt; Isidora Jiménez; Belen Ituarte	Chile	44.31	3
25	Isabel Posch; Magdalena Lindner; Karin Strametz; Viktoria Willhuber	Austria	44.49	4
26	Liranyi Alonso; Martha Méndez; Milagros Durán; Fiordaliza Cofil	Dominican Republic	44.72	2
27	Miia Ott; Ann Marii Kivikas; Kreete Verlin; Diana Suumann	Estonia	44.81	3
28	Astrid Glenner-Frandsen; Mathilde Kramer; Emma Beiter Bomme; Klara Skriver Loessl	Denmark	45.03	2
	Rani Vincke; Rani Rosius; Elise Mehuys; Delphine Nkansa	Belgium	DQ	3
	Laura Moreira; Jocelin Echazabal; Yarima García; Yunisleidy García	Cuba	DNF	4

=== Repechage Olympic qualifying round ===
The repechage round consisted of all countries which did not qualify for the finals. The top two countries in each repechage heat qualified for the 2024 Olympics, however there was no path for the repechage teams to qualify for the World Relays finals later in the day.

Women's 4x100 Metres Relay Olympic Qualifying Round 2 - Heat
Place	Athlete	Country	Time	Heat
1	Zaynab Dosso; Dalia Kaddari; Irene Siragusa; Arianna de Masi	Italy	42.60	1
2	Murielle Ahouré-Demps; Jessika Gbai; Maboundou Koné; Marie-Josée Ta Lou	Ivory Coast	42.63	1
3	Justina Tiana Eyakpobeyan; Favour Ofili; Olayinka Olajide; Tima Godbless	Nigeria	42.71	3
4	Jodean Williams; Tia Clayton; Remona Burchell; Alana Reid	Jamaica	42.74	2
5	Géraldine Frey; Salomé Kora; Léonie Pointet; Sarah Atcho	Switzerland	42.75	3
6	Sonia Molina-Prados; Jaël Bestué; Paula Sevilla; María Isabel Pérez	Spain	42.88	1
7	Liang Xiaojing; Ge Manqi; Yuan Qiqi; Li Yuting	China	43.13	3
8	Rani Vincke; Rani Rosius; Janie de Naeyer; Delphine Nkansa	Belgium	43.17	1
9	Devynne Charlton; Camille Rutherford; Charisma Taylor; Printassia Johnson	Bahamas	43.32	3
10	Aimara Nazareno; Anahí Suárez; Nicole Caicedo; Ángela Tenorio	Ecuador	43.47	1
11	Gabriela Mourão; Ana Azevedo; Lorraine Martins; Vitória Cristina Rosa	Brazil	43.51	3
12	Taejha Badal; Reese Webster; Reyare Thomas; Leah Bertrand	Trinidad and Tobago	43.54	2
13	Manaka Miura; Remi Tsuruta; Shuri Aono; Aiha Yamagata	Japan	43.63	1
14	Marlet Ospino; Angélica Gamboa; Laura Martínez; Natalia Linares	Colombia	43.92	3
15	Jusztina Csóti; Anna Kocsis; Boglárka Takács; Alexa Sulyán	Hungary	44.04	2
16	Laura Moreira; Jocelin Echazabal; Yarima García; Yunisleidy García	Cuba	44.05	2
17	Ebony Morrison; Destiny Smith-Barnett; Maia McCoy; Symone Darius	Liberia	44.31	2
18	Isidora Jiménez; Viviana Olivares; Anaís Hernández; María Ignacia Montt	Chile	44.40	2
19	Astrid Glenner-Frandsen; Mathilde Kramer; Emma Beiter Bomme; Klara Skriver Loessl	Denmark	44.88	2
20	Miia Ott; Ann Marii Kivikas; Kreete Verlin; Diana Suumann	Estonia	45.56	3
	Isabel Posch; Magdalena Lindner; Karin Strametz; Viktoria Willhuber	Austria	DNF	1
		Dominican Republic	DNS	3

=== Final ===
Women's 4x100 Metres Relay
Place	Athlete	Country	Time
1st place, gold medalist(s)	Tamari Davis; Gabrielle Thomas; Celera Barnes; Melissa Jefferson	United States	41.85
2nd place, silver medalist(s)	Chloé Galet; Gémima Joseph; Hélène Parisot; Mallory Leconte	France	42.75
3rd place, bronze medalist(s)	Alyson Bell; Amy Hunt; Bianca Williams; Aleeya Sibbons	Great Britain	42.80
4	Louise Wieland; Nele Jaworski; Gina Lückenkemper; Rebekka Haase	Germany	42.93
5	Ebony Lane; Bree Masters; Ella Connolly; Torrie Lewis	Australia	43.02
6	N'Ketia Seedo; Marije van Hunenstijn; Minke Bisschops; Tasa Jiya	Netherlands	43.07
7	Sade McCreath; Marie-Éloise Leclair; Audrey Leduc; Donna Ntambue	Canada	43.09
	Martyna Kotwiła; Monika Romaszko; Magdalena Stefanowicz; Ewa Swoboda	Poland	DNF
