= Athletics at the 2024 Summer Olympics – Women's 4 × 100 metres relay =

Women's 4 × 100 metres relay at the Games of the XXXIII Olympiad
- Venue: Stade de France, Paris, France
- Dates: 8 August 2024 (round 1); 9 August 2024 (final)
- Winning time: 41.78

Medalists
1st place, gold medalist(s)		Melissa Jefferson, Twanisha Terry, Gabrielle Thomas, Sha'Carri Richardson	United States
2nd place, silver medalist(s)		Dina Asher-Smith, Imani-Lara Lansiquot, Amy Hunt, Daryll Neita, Bianca Williams*, Desiree Henry*	Great Britain
3rd place, bronze medalist(s)		Alexandra Burghardt, Lisa Mayer, Gina Lückenkemper, Rebekka Haase, Sophia Junk* *Indicates the athlete only competed in the preliminary heats.	Germany

Official Video

The women's 4 × 100 metres relay at the 2024 Summer Olympics was held in two rounds at the Stade de France in Paris, France, on 8 and 9 August 2024. This was the 23rd time that the women's 4 × 100 metres relay was contested at the Summer Olympics. A total of 16 teams were able to qualify for the event through the 2024 World Athletics Relays or the World Athletics top list.

== Summary ==
Jamaica was the defending champions, but none of the individuals on their team returned. For returning silver medalists USA, only Gabrielle Thomas competed. Bronze medalists Great Britain brought back three Dina Asher-Smith, Imani-Lara Lansiquot and Daryll Neita. More recently, USA won the 2022 and 2023 World Championships with much the same team, defeating a much stronger team from Jamaica in 2023, with GBR also with a similar team in third. GBR was second in 2022 while a similar German team won bronze. USA had the gold medalist in the 200 with second, third and fifth in the 100 final. That would, on paper, be the favorites. No other team put more than one into the 100 final. Unlike the other relays, USA ran the same four athletes in both rounds.

GBR started off fast with Asher-Smith opening up a third of a second over GER Alexandra Burghardt, with Melissa Jefferson USA, Alana Reid JAM and Salomé Kora about even behind GER. Lansiquot maintained the GBR lead, but Twanisha Terry rocketed the backstretch to put USA clearly in second. Gémima Joseph ran a strong second leg to put France in third. During the pass, Thomas had her hand out a long time before Terry could find it with the baton, costing USA some time. Gina Lückenkemper ran a fast turn to bring Germany even with GBR. France was slightly ahead of USA for the final handoff, but it was to 2023 World Champion Sha'Carri Richardson with a running start. Richardson looked back to make sure the baton got into her hand. Germany had the lead handing off to Rebekka Haase, a step up on GBR with Daryll Neita working down the home stretch to reel in Haase. Bursting out of the crowd, Richardson cruised by Neita and Haase half way down the straightway, then looking back to make sure she had the win for the USA, with Great Britain finishing second and Germany third.

== Background ==
The 4 × 100 metres relay at the Summer Olympics is the shortest track relay event held at the multi-sport event. The women's event has been continuously held since the 1928 Olympic Games in Amsterdam.

Global records before the 2024 Summer Olympics
Record	Athlete (Nation)	Time (s)	Location	Date
World record	United States (Tianna Madison, Allyson Felix, Bianca Knight, Carmelita Jeter)	40.82	London, United Kingdom	10 August 2012
Olympic record	United States (Tianna Madison, Allyson Felix, Bianca Knight, Carmelita Jeter)	40.82	London, United Kingdom	10 August 2012
World leading	Great Britain (Dina Asher-Smith, Imani Lansiquot, Amy Hunt, Daryll Neita)	41.55	London, United Kingdom	20 July 2024

Area records before the 2024 Summer Olympics
Area Record	Athlete (Nation)	Time (s)
Africa (records)	Ivory Coast (Murielle Ahouré-Demps, Marie-Josée Ta Lou, Jessika Gbai, Maboundou Koné)	41.90
Asia (records)	China (Lin Xiao, Li Yali, Liu Xiaomei, Li Xuemei)	42.23
Europe (records)	East Germany (Silke Möller, Sabine Rieger-Günther, Ingrid Auerswald-Lange, Marlies Göhr)	41.37
North, Central America and Caribbean (records)	United States (Tianna Madison, Allyson Felix, Bianca Knight, Carmelita Jeter)	40.82 WR
Oceania (records)	Australia (Ella Connolly, Bree Masters, Kristie Edwards, Torrie Lewis)	42.48
South America (records)	Brazil (Evelyn dos Santos, Ana Lemos, Franciela Krasucki, Rosângela Santos)	42.29

== Qualification ==
For the women's 4 × 100 metres relay event, fourteen teams qualified through the 2024 World Athletics Relays. The remaining two spots were awarded to the teams with the highest ranking on the World Athletics Top List. The qualification period is between 1 July 2023 and 30 June 2024.

Qualification event	No. of teams	Qualified teams
2024 World Athletics Relays	14	Australia; Canada; France; Germany; Great Britain; Italy; Ivory Coast; Jamaica; Netherlands; Nigeria; Poland; Switzerland; Trinidad and Tobago; United States
World Athletics Top List (as of June 30, 2024)	2	Spain; Belgium
Total	16	

== Results ==
=== Round 1 ===
Round 1 was held on 8 August, starting at 11:10 (UTC+2) in the morning.

==== Heat 1 ====
Rank	Lane	Nation	Competitors	Reaction	Time	Notes
1	6	United States	Melissa Jefferson, Twanisha Terry, Gabrielle Thomas, Sha'Carri Richardson	0.144	41.94	Q
2	7	Germany	Sophia Junk, Lisa Mayer, Gina Lückenkemper, Rebekka Haase	0.152	42.15	Q, SB
3	2	Switzerland	Salomé Kora, Sarah Atcho-Jaquier, Léonie Pointet, Mujinga Kambundji	0.133	42.38	Q, SB
4	5	Australia	Ella Connolly, Bree Masters, Kristie Edwards, Torrie Lewis	0.153	42.75	
5	8	Poland	Magdalena Niemczyk, Krystsina Tsimanouskaya, Magdalena Stefanowicz, Ewa Swoboda	0.156	42.86	
6	4	Italy	Zaynab Dosso, Dalia Kaddari, Irene Siragusa, Arianna De Masi	0.159	43.03	
–	3	Belgium	Rani Vincke, Rani Rosius, Elise Mehuys, Delphine Nkansa	0.137	DQ	TR 24.7
–	9	Ivory Coast	Murielle Ahouré-Demps, Jessika Gbai, Maboundou Koné, Marie Josée Ta Lou-Smith	0.153	DQ	TR 17.2.3

==== Heat 2 ====
Rank	Lane	Nation	Competitors	Reaction	Time	Notes
1	7	Great Britain	Bianca Williams, Imani Lansiquot, Amy Hunt, Desiree Henry	0.173	42.03	Q
2	6	France	Orlann Oliere, Gémima Joseph, Hélène Parisot, Chloé Galet	0.163	42.13	Q
3	9	Jamaica	Alana Reid, Kemba Nelson, Shashalee Forbes, Tia Clayton	0.164	42.35	Q, SB
4	8	Canada	Sade McCreath, Jacqueline Madogo, Marie-Éloïse Leclair, Audrey Leduc	0.140	42.50	q, NR
5	5	Netherlands	Isabel van den Berg, Marije van Hunenstijn, Minke Bisschops, Tasa Jiya	0.157	42.64	q
6	4	Nigeria	Justina Tiana Eyakpobeyan, Favour Ofili, Rosemary Chukwuma, Tima Godbless	0.168	42.70	SB
7	3	Spain	Sonia Molina-Prados, Jaël Bestué, Paula Sevilla, María Isabel Pérez	0.183	42.77	SB
8	2	Trinidad and Tobago	Akilah Lewis, Sole Frederick, Sanaa Frederick, Leah Bertrand	0.156	43.99	

=== Final ===
The final was held on 9 August, starting at 19:30 (UTC+2) in the evening.

Rank	Lane	Nation	Competitors	Reaction	Time	Notes
1st place, gold medalist(s)	5	United States	Melissa Jefferson, Twanisha Terry, Gabrielle Thomas, Sha'Carri Richardson	0.155	41.78	SB
2nd place, silver medalist(s)	8	Great Britain	Dina Asher-Smith, Imani-Lara Lansiquot, Amy Hunt, Daryll Neita	0.177	41.85	
3rd place, bronze medalist(s)	7	Germany	Alexandra Burghardt, Lisa Mayer, Gina Lückenkemper, Rebekka Haase	0.166	41.97	SB
4	6	France	Orlann Oliere, Gémima Joseph, Hélène Parisot, Chloé Galet	0.156	42.23	
5	4	Jamaica	Alana Reid, Kemba Nelson, Shashalee Forbes, Tia Clayton	0.143	42.29	SB
6	3	Canada	Sade McCreath, Jacqueline Madogo, Marie-Éloïse Leclair, Audrey Leduc	0.129	42.69	
7	2	Netherlands	Isabel van den Berg, Marije van Hunenstijn, Minke Bisschops, Tasa Jiya	0.144	42.74	
–	9	Switzerland	Salomé Kora, Sarah Atcho-Jaquier, Léonie Pointet, Mujinga Kambundji	0.134	DQ	TR 24.7
