= Donna Ntambue =

Canadian sprinter

Personal information
- Born: 26 February 2001 (age 25)
- Home town: Montreal, Quebec

Sport
- Sport: Athletics
- Event: Sprint

Achievements and titles
- Personal best(s): 60m: 7.32 (2024); 100m: 11.36 (2024); 200m: 23.94 (2024)
Medal record
Women's athletics
Representing Canada
World Relays
Silver medal – second place	2026 Gaborone	4×100 m relay

Donna Ntambue (born 26 February 2001) is a Canadian sprinter. In 2026, she was part of the Canada women's 4 × 100 metres relay team which set a new national record at the 2026 World Athletics Relays.

== Biography ==
From Montreal, Ntammbue experienced junior international competitions in athletics and basketball representing Canada under-16 International Basketball Federation Americas Tournament for basketball and in 2018 at the Buenos Aires Youth Olympic Games in track and field. As a basketball player, Ntambue was named Réseau du sport étudiant du Québec (RSEQ) player, rookie, and defensive player of the year in the 2018-2019 season while studying at Collège Montmorency. Ntambue spent two seasons playing basketball for the University of Utah from 2020 to 2021 and for Northeastern University from 2021 to 2022.

Competing in athletics, Ntambue was part of the Canadian 4 × 100 m relay team that competed at the 2024 World Athletics Relays in Nassau, Bahamas, and placed seventh overall in the final.

Ntambue placed fifth overall in 11.38 seconds in the 100 metres at the 2025 Canadian Athletics Championships in Ottawa, and was named as part of the Canadian relay pool for the 2025 World Championships in Tokyo.

Selected as part of the Canadian team for the 2026 World Athletics Relays in Botswana, she ran alongside Sade McCreath, Marie-Éloïse Leclair and Audrey Leduc to help Canada qualify for the women's 4x100 metres final with a time of 42.39 seconds. She ran the anchor leg in the final the following day as Canada won the silver medal behind Jamaica in a national record 42.17 seconds.
