= Athletics at the 2026 Commonwealth Games – Women's 4 × 100 metres relay =

Women's 4 × 100 metres relay at the 2026 Commonwealth Games
- Venue: Scotstoun Stadium, Glasgow
- Dates: 1 August 2026 (semifinals and final)
- Winning time: 42.65

Medalists
gold medal	Alana Reid; Jodean Williams; Lavanya Williams; Ashanti Moore	Jamaica
silver medal	Sade McCreath; Marie-Éloïse Leclair; Frédérique Chiasson; Audrey Leduc	Canada
bronze medal	Michelle-Lee Ahye; Shaniqua Bascombe; Reese Webster; Leah Bertrand	Trinidad and Tobago

The women's 4 × 100 metres relay at the 2026 Commonwealth Games, as part of the athletics programme, is taking place at the Scotstoun Stadium on 1 August 2026.

== Records ==
Prior to this competition, the existing world and Games records were as follows:

World record	United States (Tianna Madison, Allyson Felix, Bianca Knight, Carmelita Jeter)	40.82	London, United Kingdom	10 August 2012
Commonwealth record	Jamaica (Briana Williams, Elaine Thompson-Herah, Shelly-Ann Fraser-Pryce, Shericka Jackson)	41.02	Tokyo, Japan	6 August 2021
Games record	Jamaica (Kerron Stewart, Veronica Campbell-Brown, Schillonie Calvert, Shelly-Ann Fraser-Pryce)	41.83	Glasgow, Scotland	2 August 2014

== Schedule ==
The schedule was as follows:

Date	Time	Round
1 August 2026	10:00	First round
1 August 2026	18:30	Final

== Results ==
=== First round ===
The first round was held on the morning of 1 August 2026.

Rank	Heat	Lane	Nation	Athletes	Time	Notes
1	2	3	Jamaica	Alana Reid, Jodean Williams, Lavanya Williams, Ashanti Moore	42.74	Q
2	1	2	Canada	Frederique Chiasson, Audrey Leduc, Marie-Éloïse Leclair, Sade McCreath	43.15	Q
3	1	7	Trinidad and Tobago	Michelle-Lee Ahye, Shaniqua Bascombe, Reese Webster, Leah Bertrand	43.31	Q, SB
4	1	6	Australia	Ebony Lane, Chloe Mannix-Power, Monique Hanlon, Georgia Harris	43.52	Q
5	2	5	Nigeria	Miracle Ezechukwu, Obi Jennifer Chukwuka, Olayinka Olajide, Prestina Oluchi Ochonogor	43.93	Q
6	2	4	England	Mabel Akande, Aleeya Sibbons, Renee Regis, Louise Evans	44.11	Q
7	2	7	The Gambia	Nyimansata Jawneh, Isatou Sey, Sirreh Sanneh, Gina Mariam Bass Bittaye	44.68	q, SB
8	1	4	Scotland	Lucy Fraser, Kaya Slater, Alyson Bell, Alisha Rees	44.89	q
9	2	2	Singapore	Amanda Loo, Elizabeth-Ann Tan, Kerstin Ong, Shanti Pereira	45.52	SB
10	2	6	Maldives	Aishath Shabaa Saleem, Ziva Moosa Shafeeu, Aminath Layaana, Ahbaa Nizaar	47.04	NR
11	1	5	Papua New Guinea	Adrine Monagi, Denlyne Kinbangi, Hephzibah Romalus, Isila Apkup	47.42	
12	1	3	Ghana	Evonne Britton, Deborah Acheampong, Lovina Ewusi, Anita Afrifa	50.75	

=== Final ===
The final will take place on the evening of 1 August 2028.

Place	Nation	Athletes	Time	Notes
1st place, gold medalist(s)	Jamaica	Alana Reid, Jodean Williams, Lavanya Williams, Ashanti Moore	42.65	
2nd place, silver medalist(s)	Canada	Sade McCreath, Marie-Éloïse Leclair, Frédérique Chiasson, Audrey Leduc	42.76	
3rd place, bronze medalist(s)	Trinidad and Tobago	Michelle-Lee Ahye, Shaniqua Bascombe, Reese Webster, Leah Bertrand	43.07	
4	Australia	Ebony Lane, Chloe Mannix-Power, Monique Hanlon, Torrie Lewis	43.09	
5	England	Mabel Akande, Aleeya Sibbons, Renee Regis, Success Eduan	43.45	
6	Nigeria	Miracle Ezechukwu, Obi Jennifer Chukwuka, Olayinka Olajide, Prestina Oluchi Ochonogor	43.74	
7	Scotland	Lucy Fraser, Kaya Slater, Alyson Bell, Alisha Rees	44.81	
8	The Gambia	Nyimansata Jawneh, Isatou Sey, Serreh Sanneh, Gina Mariam Bass Bittaye	44.85	
