= Lucía Carrillo =

Spanish sprinter (born 2002)

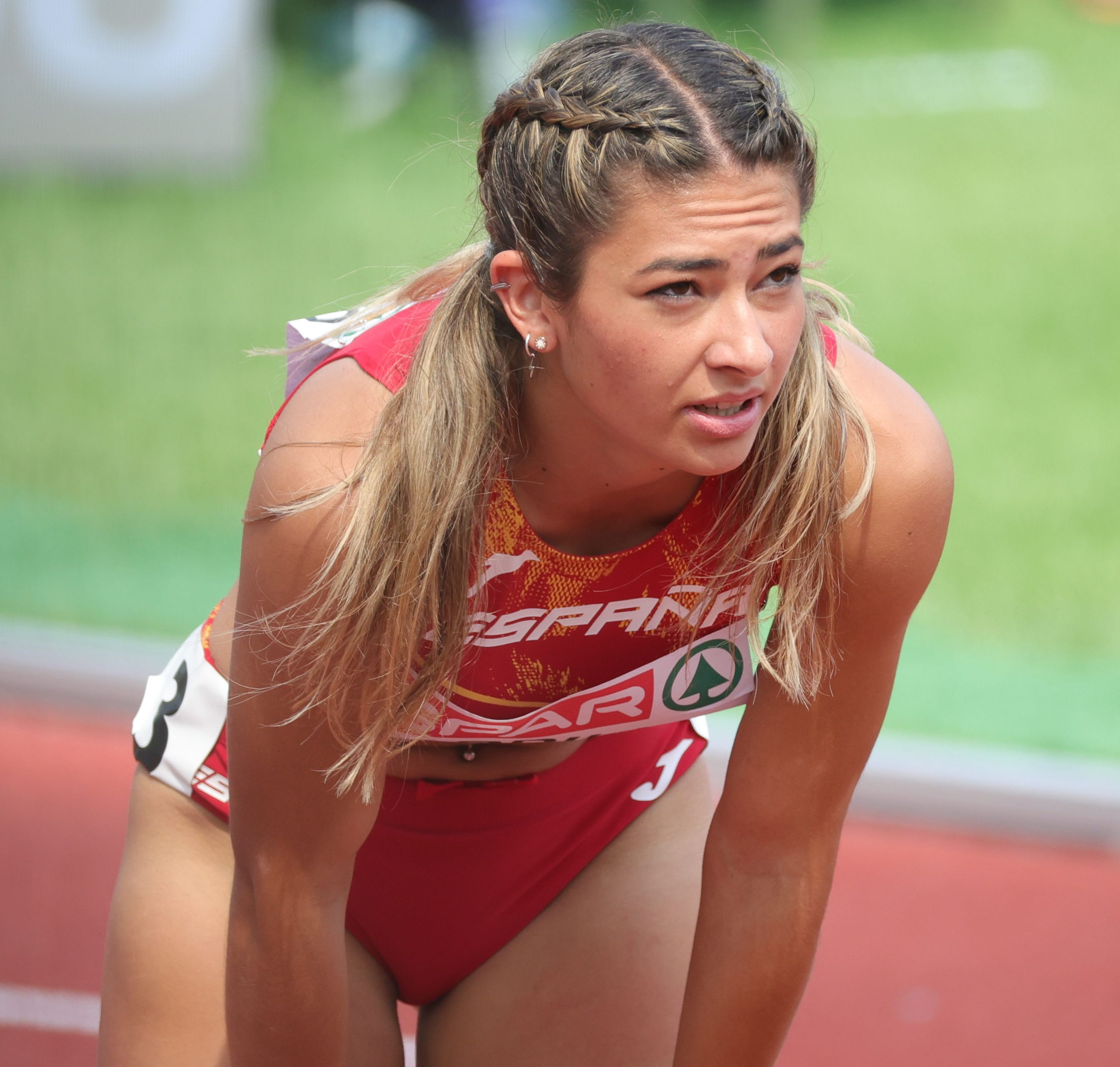
- Carillo in 2022

Personal information
- Born: 4 January 2002 (age 24)
- Height: 170 cm (5 ft 7 in)

Sport
- Sport: Athletics
- Event: Sprint
Medal record
Women's athletics
Representing Spain
World Relay Championships
Bronze medal – third place	2026 Gaborone	4×100 m relay

Lucía Carrillo (born 4 January 2002) is a Spanish sprinter. She was a bronze medalist at the 2026 World Athletics Relays in the women's 4 × 100 metres relay.

== Biography ==
From Burgos, Carillo placed fourth in the 200 metres at the 2021 World Athletics U20 Championships in Nairobi, Kenya. In Tallinn later that year, Carrillo ran a personal best for the 200 m of 23.55 seconds in the semi-final of the 2021 European Athletics U20 Championships. In the final, she ran 23.80 and finished in sixth place overall.

In August 2022, she represented Spain at the 2022 European Athletics Championships in Munich, running a time of 23.64 seconds. Later that year, she won the bronze medal in the 100 m at the U23 Mediterranean Championships in Pescara with a time of 11.62 seconds, finishing behind the French runners Chloé Galet and Mallory Leconte.

In 2024, Carrillo broke the Castilla and León U23 and overall record for the 60 meters flat, with a time of 7.40 seconds, to hold six Castilla and León indoor records in total, holding the 60 and 200 metres records in the under-20, under-23 and all-time list.

Carrillo was part of the Spanish team for the 2025 World Athletics Relays. That summer, she placed second over 100 metres at the Spanish Athletics Championships, running 11.36 seconds.

Carillo was named in the Spanish team for the 2026 World Athletics Relays in Gaborone, Botswana. On the opening day she ran as part the women's 4x100m relay team alongside Jaël Bestué, Esperança Cladera and Maribel Pérez as they ran 42.26 to win the first heat ahead of Canada and qualifying for the final with the second-fastest overall time, surpassed only by Jamaica. The following day, the quartet won the bronze medal in the final behind Jamaica and Canada. In August, She competed in the women's 4 × 100 metres relay at the 2026 European Athletics Championships in Birmingham, England.
