= Ashanti Moore =

Jamaican athlete

Personal information
- Nationality: Jamaica
- Born: 7 November 2000 (age 25)

Sport
- Sport: Athletics
- Event: Sprint
- Club: SprinTec
- Coached by: Maurice Wilson

Achievements and titles
- Personal bests: 60m 7.06 (Spanish Town, 2026); 100m: 10.94 (Serbia, 2025); 200m: 22.30 (Budapest, 2026)
Medal record
Women's athletics
Representing Jamaica
Commonwealth Games
Gold medal – first place	2026 Glasgow	4×100m relay

Ashanti Moore (born 7 November 2000) is a Jamaican track and field athlete who competes as a sprinter. She won the Jamaican Athletics Championships in 2025 over 200 metres.

== Biography ==
Moore attended Hydel High School in St. Catherine, Jamaica, where she participated in the ISSA Boys and Girls high school championships taking the Class One double in 2019.

== Career ==
In April 2023, Moore set a new 200m personal best time in consecutive weeks, running 22.62 in Waco, Texas and then following it up with a mark of 22.49 seconds for the 200 metres at the Texas Invitational event in Austin, Texas. At that event she also won the 100 metres, running a seasons-best 11.12 seconds. In July 2023, she ran a new personal best 100m time of 11.06 seconds to finish in sixth place in the final at the Jamaican Athletics Championships held in Kingston, Jamaica.

Moore was selected to compete in the 200 metres at the 2023 World Athletics Championships in Budapest in August, 2023. She finished fifth in her heat, running 23.12 seconds.

At the Jamaica Athletics Invitational WA Continental Tour Silver inside Independence Park, she recorded 23.00 in the 200 metres for 4th place.

She qualified from her 200 metres semi-final at the 2025 Jamaican Athletics Championships in 22.92 seconds before returning the following day to win claim her first national title, winning in 22.66 seconds ahead of Gabrielle Matthews. She was named in the Jamaican squad for the 2025 NACAC Championships in Nassau, The Bahamas. In September 2025, she was a semi-finalist in the 200 metres at the 2025 World Championships in Tokyo, Japan.

At the Qwick Meet at the GC Foster College in March, she ran a 60 metres personal best of 7.06s (+1.2). Moore placed fourth in the 100 metres final at the 2026 Jamaican Athletics Championships on 19 June 2026, with a time of 11.08 seconds. That weekend, she also placed third in the final of the 200 metres in 22.45 seconds, behind Alana Reid and Lavanya Williams. She was a finalist in the 200 metres at the 2026 Commonwealth Games in Glasgow, Scotland, placing fourth overall. Later at the Games, she won a gold medal in the women's 4 × 100 m relay. In September, she was a finalist over 200 m at the inaugural World Ultimate Championship in Budapest, running a new personal best of 22.30 seconds.

=== Bobsleigh ===
In July 2025, Moore was announced as an addition to the Jamaica Bobsleigh and Skeleton Federation (JBSF) with JBSF President Nelson Stokes describing her as "an impressive athlete with all the attributes of a world-beater in bobsleigh."
