= Frédérique Chiasson =

Canadian sprinter

Personal information
- Born: 12 January 2002 (age 24)

Sport
- Sport: Athletics
- Event: Sprint
Medal record
Women's athletics
Representing Canada
Commonwealth Games
Silver medal – second place	2026 Glasgow	4×100m relay

Frédérique Chiasson (born 12 January 2002) is a Canadian sprinter.

== Biography ==
From La Sarre, in Abitibi-Témiscamingue, Chiasson studies at Laval University.

In August 2025, she ran a personal best and Games record 23.08 seconds to win the 200 metres at the 2025 Canada Games having previously reset the Games record with a time of 23.24 seconds in the preliminary round.

She was selected as part of the Canada team for the 2026 World Athletics Relays in Gaborone, Botswana. She was selected for the 2026 Commonwealth Games in Glasgow, Scotland, where she was a semi-finalist in the women's 200 metres. Later at the games, she ran as part of the Canadian women's 4 x 100 metres relay team as they won the silver medal in the women's 4 × 100 metres relay.
