= Printassia Johnson =

Bahamian sprinter

Printassia Johnson (born 12 November 1993) is a Bahamian sprinter.

She ran the 100 metres in 12.07 seconds in 2009. In 2012 she recorded 7.73 seconds in the 60 metres and 24.60 seconds in the 200 metres. By 2015 she had improved the two latter events to 7.65 and 24.44 seconds respectively. She competed at the Carifta Games and attended the Queen's College, Nassau She competed collegiately for several colleges; Illinois State University, Florida Memorial University, Grambling State University] and Life University.

Johnson was absent from athletics between 2016 and 2021, before started training by herself again, and being picked up by Bahamas-based coach Ednal Rolle. Johnson then returned to the United States and made a serious comeback in 2022. At the JML Levitate Invite in Miami in May she broke the 12-second barrier with 11.81 in the 100 metres. She also ran good wind-assisted times before doing 11.74 and 23.86 at the Bahamas Championships. Lastly, at the 2022 NACAC Championships she another personal best in the 100 metres of 11.66 seconds, but did not reach the final, and won a silver medal in the 4 × 100 metres relay.

In 2024 she improved her times again, first 23.81 in the 200 metres at the Vanderbilt Invitational in Nashville, 7.53 in the 60 metres at the Tiger Paw Invitational in Clemson (both indoors), 23.50 at the Pepsi Florida Relays in Gainesville, 23.23 at the LSU Alumni Gold meet in Baton Rouge and 11.56 at the Last Chance Qualifier in Atlanta. Invited to the 2024 World Athletics Relays, Johnson ran the 4 × 100 metres relay.

Johnson then transitioned to the 400 metres. In doing so she was coached by Dominic Demeritte at the Life University. She won the 400 metres both individually and relay at the 2025 NAIA Championships. Running the distance in 51.29 seconds in July 2025, she proceeded to become Bahamian champion in August in 51.25 seconds. Another personal best of 51.07 in the heats at the 2025 NACAC Championships was followed by a fourth place in the final. However, she also took part in a failed attempt to qualify for the relay at the 2025 World Championships. The team was 5 seconds off the qualiying standard.
