= Novig =

Prediction market and financial exchange

- Type: Private
- Industry: Prediction market, Sports betting
- Headquarters: 169 Madison Avenue Suite 2199; New York, NY 10012
- Website: novig.com

Novig is a sports-focused prediction market platform based in New York City. It is regulated as a financial exchange rather than a sportsbook.

Novig was co-founded by Jacob Fortinsky and Kelechi Ukah in 2024. It started as a state-licensed betting shop in Colorado before transitioning to a dual-currency sweepstakes company later that year. Novig changed strategies again when it applied for Commodity Futures Trading Commission (CFTC) registration as a prediction market exchange operator in January 2026, doing business as Ludlow Exchange, LLC. The registration received CFTC approval as a designated contract market in June. Novig officially relaunched in 47 states (excluding Arizona, Michigan, and Nevada) on August 4. The next day, Novig sued New York in federal court to prevent the state from enforcing its sports betting laws. Within 72 hours, the company brought similar suits to Massachusetts, New Mexico, and Washington.

In September 2026, actress Sydney Sweeney appeared nude in an advertisement for Novig, using sports equipment as props to cover up while repeating the tagline "Just sports". The company also described her as a "strategic partner and equity holder." The advertisement attracted criticism from several female athletes, including gymnast Gracie Kramer, sprinter Amy Hunt, and swimmer Ariarne Titmus, for objectifying and setting back women in sports. Others described the controversy as likely intentional as a form of outrage marketing. Novig released a second iteration of ads featuring Sweeney in October, with co-founder and CEO Jacob Fortinsky defending the strategy. As per The Conversation, the campaign represented two trends: "how routinely women’s bodies are sexualized in digital media and how gambling companies use sexual appeal [...] to target young men."
