= Chloé Galet =

French athlete (born 2001)

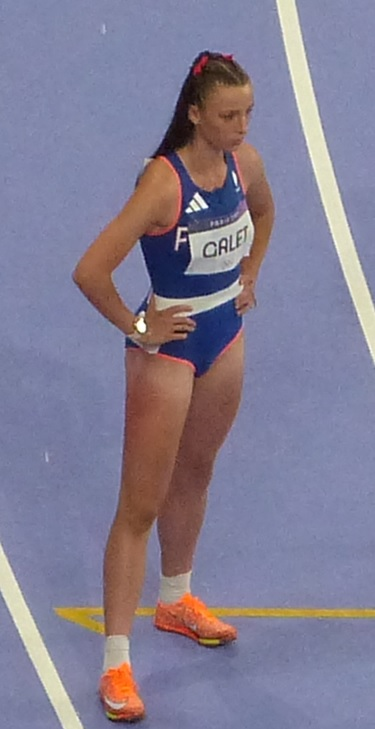
- Galet at the 2024 Paris Olympics

Personal information
- Born: 30 August 2001 (age 25) Fourmies, Nord, France
- Height: 168 cm (5 ft 6 in)
- Weight: 60 kg (132 lb)

Sport
- Country: France
- Sport: Athletics
- Event: Sprint
- Club: U.S.Maubeuge

Achievements and titles
- Personal bests: 60m: 7.29 (Metz, 2024); 100m: 11.11 (Angers, 2024); 200m: 23.31 (Angers, 2024)
Medal record
Women's athletics
Representing France
World Relays
Silver medal – second place	2024 Nassau	4×100 m relay

Chloé Galet (born 30 August 2001) is a French sprinter. She competed at the 2024 Olympic Games where she was a finalist as part of the French team in the women's 4 x 100 meters relay, in which they placed fourth overall.

== Early life ==
She is from Fourmies, Nord. She studied in Valenciennes at the Polytechnic University of Hauts-de-France.

== Career ==
She was selected for the French 4x100m relay squad for the 2022 European Championships in Munich. In December 2022, she set a 60m personal best of 7.39 in Reims.

She set a personal best time of 11.41 seconds in the 100m during the 2023 French U21 Championships in Fontainebleau. She was selected for the 2023 European Athletics U23 Championships but suffered a hamstring injury during the event.

She lowered her 60m personal best to 7.29 in winning the French University Championships in February 2024. In June 2024, she lowered her personal best for the 100 metres to 11.11 seconds whilst running in Angers to move into the top-ten of the French all-time list. She ran as part of the French 4x100m relay team which finished as runner-up and qualified for the 2024 Paris Olympics at the 2024 World Relays Championships in Nassau, Bahamas. She competed in the 4 x 100 metres relay at the 2024 Paris Olympics as part of the French team which placed fourth overall.

She competed at the 2025 World Athletics Relays in China in the Women's 4 × 100 metres relay in May 2025.

In May 2026, she ran at the 2026 World Athletics Relays in the women's 4 × 100 metres relay in Gaborone, Botswana.

== Personal life ==
She received the medal of honour from her home town Fourmies, Nord in May 2024. Her twin sister Lea also competes in track and field.
