= Anne van de Wiel =

Dutch athlete (born 1997)

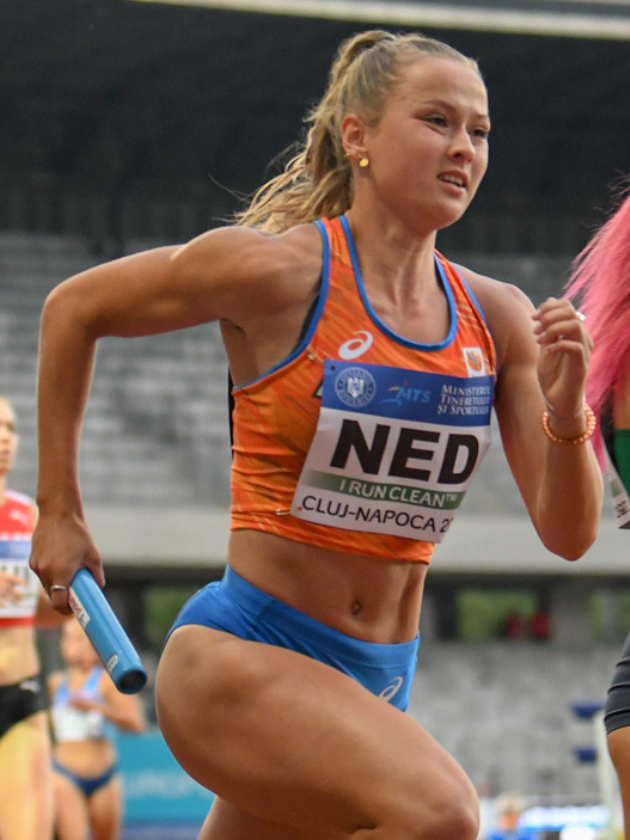
- van de Wiel in 2021

Personal information
- Nationality: Dutch
- Born: 4 June 1997 (age 29)
- Height: 1.68 m (5 ft 6 in)

Sport
- Sport: Athletics
- Events: 400 metres, heptathlon

Achievements and titles
- Personal bests: 200 m: 23.68 (2021); 400 m: 52.54 (2024); 400 mH: 57.28 (2024); Heptathlon: 5756 (2020)
Medal record
Women's athletics
Representing the Netherlands
European Championships
Gold medal – first place	2024 Rome	4×400 m relay

Anne van de Wiel (pronounced [ˈɑnə vɑn də ˈʋil]; born 4 June 1997) is a Dutch multi-event athlete. She won Dutch heptathlon national titles in 2019 and 2020.

== Personal life ==
Van de Wiel is from Breda, and her twin sister Myke is also an athlete. She studied sociology at Erasmus University. Both sisters later moved to train in Rotterdam.

== Career ==
Early in her athletics career, van de Wiel competed primarily in the heptathlon. She won the silver medal in the heptathlon at the 2017 Dutch Championships in Utrecht.

At the 2018 Dutch Championships in June, van de Wiel won silver in the heptathlon behind her sister Myke.

At the 2019 Dutch Championships in Den Haag, held in July, van de Wiel won the heptathlon with a total of 5712 points.

Van de Wiel won bronze in the heptathlon at the 2020 NK Indoor Meerkamp. She also participated in two individual events at the 2020 Dutch Indoor Championships in Apeldoorn in February. She finished fourth in the 200 meters and eighth in the long jump. Van de Wiel won the Dutch Championships title in the heptathlon again in September 2020 in Emmeloord with a score of 5756 points, setting her personal best.

In 2021, van de Wiel started specializing in the 400 metres. She dropped her personal best in the event to 53.46 seconds in June. Van de Wiel travelled as part of the Dutch relay team to the 2020 Summer Olympics in Tokyo but did not compete.

At the 2022 Dutch Championships in Apeldoorn in June, van de Wiel won the bronze medal in the 400 m.

At the 2023 Dutch Championships in Breda in July, she won the silver medal in the 400 m hurdles.

In May 2024, van de Wiel went under 53 seconds in the 400 m, accomplishing the feat twice. In June, she competed as part of the Dutch 4 × 400 m relay team at the 2024 European Championships in Rome. Van de Wiel ran in the heats, and the Netherlands finished first in the final, earning her a gold medal. She travelled to the 2024 Summer Olympics in Paris with the Dutch relay team but did not compete.

She competed at the 2025 World Athletics Relays in China in the Women's 4 × 100 metres relay in May 2025.

In May 2026, she competed with the Dutch squad at the 2026 World Athletics Relays in Gaborone, Botswana. In July, she won the 400 metres hurdles title at the 2026 Dutch Championships.
