= Jodean Williams =

Jamaican sprinter

Personal information
- Born: 11 November 1993 (age 32)
- Height: 1.70 m (5 ft 7 in)
- Weight: 65 kg (143 lb)

Sport
- Sport: Athletics
- Event: 200 metres
- Club: 1. Racers 2. SprinTec
Medal record
Women's athletics
Representing Jamaica
World Championships
| Silver medal – second place | 2025 Tokyo | 4 × 100 m relay |
World Relays
| Gold medal – first place | 2026 Gaborone | 4×100 m relay |
Commonwealth Games
| Gold medal – first place | 2026 Glasgow | 4×100m relay |
Central American and Caribbean Games
| Bronze medal – third place | 2018 Barranquilla | 200 m |

Jodean Williams (born 11 November 1993) is a Jamaican sprinter competing primarily in the 200 metres. She represented her country at the 2017 World Championships and the 2025 World Athletics Indoor Championships reaching the semifinals on both occasions.

== Statistics ==
=== Circuit performances ===
Grand Slam Track results
| Slam | Race group | Event | Pl. | Time | Prize money |
|---|---|---|---|---|---|
| 2025 Kingston Slam | Short sprints | 100 m | 8th | 11.68 | US$12,500 |
| 2025 Kingston Slam | Short sprints | 200 m | 7th | 24.29 | US$12,500 |

=== International competitions ===
| Year | Competition | Venue | Position | Event | Notes |
Representing Jamaica
| 2012 | Central American and Caribbean; Junior Championships (U20) | San Salvador, El Salvador | 3rd | 200 m | 24.07 |
| 2012 | World Junior Championships | Barcelona, Spain | 12th (sf) | 200 m | 23.94 |
| 2015 | NACAC Championships | San José, Costa Rica | 6th | 200 m | 23.12 |
| 2017 | World Championships | London, United Kingdom | 20th (sf) | 200 m | 23.32 |
| 2018 | Central American and Caribbean Games | Barranquilla, Colombia | 3rd | 200 m | 22.96 |
| 2025 | World Indoor Championships | Nanjing, China | 10th (sf) | 60 m | 7.22 |
| 2025 | NACAC Championships | Freeport, Bahamas | 4th | 100 m | 11.13 |
| 2025 | World Championships | Tokyo, Japan | 2nd | 4 × 100 m relay | 41.80 |
| 2026 | World Relays | Gaborone, Botswana | 1st | 4 × 100 m relay | 42.00 |
| 2026 | Commonwealth Games | Glasgow, United Kingdom | 5th | 100 m | 11.09 |
| 2026 | Commonwealth Games | Glasgow, United Kingdom | 1st | 4 × 100 m relay | 42.65 |
| 2026 | World Ultimate Championship | Budapest, Hungary | 10th (h) | 100 m | 11.16 |

=== Personal bests ===
Outdoor

- 100 metres – 11.00 ((+0.8 m/s), Freeport 2025)
- 200 metres – 22.88 ((±0.0 m/s), Barranquilla 2018)
- 400 metres – 52.92 (Kingston 2018)
