= Audrey Leduc =

Canadian sprinter (born 1999)

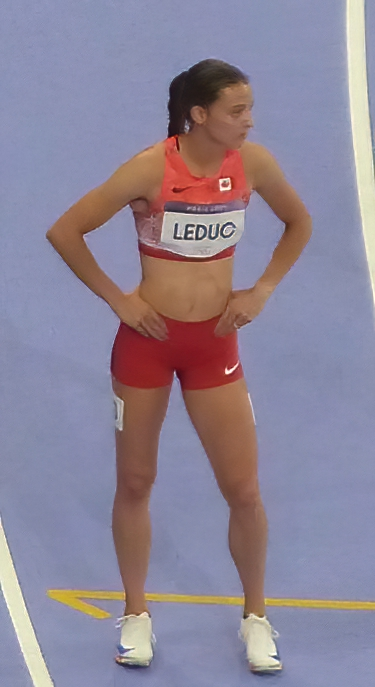

Personal information
- Born: March 9, 1999 (age 27) Gatineau, Quebec, Canada
- Education: Laval University
- Height: 5 ft 7 in (170 cm)

Sport
- Sport: Track and field
- Events: 60 m, 100 m, 200 m
- University team: Laval Rouge et Or

Achievements and titles
- Personal bests: Outdoor; 100 m: 10.94 NR (Edmonton, 2025); 200 m: 22.36 NR (Atlanta, 2024); Indoor; 60 m: 7.20 (New York 2025); 200 m: 23.94 (Clemson 2026)
Medal record
Women's track and field
Representing Canada
Commonwealth Games
Silver medal – second place	2026 Glasgow	4 × 100 m relay
NACAC U23 Championships
Silver medal – second place	2019 Queretaro	4 × 100 m relay
Pan American Championships
Gold medal – first place	2026 Medellín	200 m
World Relay Championships
Silver medal – second place	2026 Gaborone	4 × 100 m relay
Silver medal – second place	2026 Gaborone	Mixed 4 × 100 m relay

Audrey Leduc (born March 9, 1999) is a Canadian sprinter who holds the Canadian records in the 100 m (10.94) and 200 m (22.36), set in 2025 and 2024, respectively.

== Athletics career ==
In her youth, Leduc competed for the Gatineau Athletics Club, competing both sprinting events and the long jump, but specializing in the 100 m.

In 2018, Leduc won the Canadian U20 100 m title, clocking a time of 12.11 in the final. The day after the 100 m final, she competed in the long jump, jumping personal best of 5.86 m to take third.

The following year, Leduc represented Canada at the 2019 NACAC U23 Championships in Querétaro, Mexico. Competing in the 100 m, she set a personal best of 11.54 in the heats, before improving that time with clocking 11.52 with an illegal +3.3 m/s wind. She also competed as part of the Canadian 4 × 100 m relay team, taking a silver medal alongside Shyvonne Roxborough, Ashlan Best, and Natassha McDonald.

=== Laval Rouge et Or ===
2020 marked Leduc's first year competing as part of the Laval Rouge et Or track and field team. Competing in her first USPORTS Championships in March, she won bronze in the 60 m, silver in the 4 × 200 m, and a bronze in the long jump.

At the 2022 USPORTS Championships, she took bronze in the 60 m, repeating her showing from the 2020 edition, took fifth in the long jump, and won gold anchoring the Laval women to 4 × 200 m gold. Later that year, representing Quebec at the Canada Summer Games in the Niagara Region, she won three gold medals in the 100 m, 200 m, and 4 × 100 m.

In 2023, Leduc won her first USPORTS individual title, winning the long jump in a personal best of 6.11m. That same weekend she also won a bronze medal in the 4 × 200 m and fifth in the 60 m. In July, she placed fourth at the Canadian Track and Field Championships in the 100 m.

=== 2024: Breakthrough year ===
2024 marked a breakthrough year for Leduc. In March, she represented Canada at the World Indoor Championships in Glasgow, Scotland. Competing in the 60 m, where she tied her personal best of 7.22 in the first round, advancing her to the semi-finals. In the semis, she ran another personal best of 7.21, but didn't advance to the final. Later that month, at the USPORTS Championships, she won gold in the 60 m and led the Laval women's 4 × 200 m team to a silver medal.

On March 30, Leduc opened her 2024 outdoor season at the Florida Relays in Gainesville, Florida. Competing in the 100 m, she ran a massive personal best of 11.08, eclipsing her previous best by 0.30 seconds and breaking the 36-year-old Quebec record of 11.13.

On April 20, competing at Louisiana State University, Leduc set another 100 m personal best of 10.96. With her time, Leduc broke Angela Bailey's long-standing Canadian national record of 10.98, set in 1987. Her time was also under the Paris Olympic qualifying standard of 11.07, qualifying her for the 2024 Summer Olympics in August. On May 31, Leduc ran a big personal best in the 200m of 22.36, the second fastest time ever recorded by a Canadian. In the 100m heats at the Olympics, Leduc broke her own national record with a time of 10.95.

She reached the semi-finals of the 60 metres at the 2025 World Athletics Indoor Championships in Nanjing.

== Athletics achievements ==
Information from her World Athletics profile unless otherwise noted.

=== Personal bests ===
Type	Distance	Time (s)	Wind (m/s)	Venue	Date	Notes
Individual events
Indoor	60 metres	7.20	—N/a	New York, United States	8 February 2025	
Indoor	200 metres sh	23.25	—N/a	Clemson, United States	13 February 2026	
Indoor	300 metres sh	39.97	—N/a	Montréal, Canada	27 January 2024	
Outdoor	100 metres	10.94	+0.9	Edmonton, Canada	13 July 2025	NR
Outdoor	200 metres	22.36	+1.1	Atlanta, Georgia	31 May 2024	NR
Team events
Indoor	4 × 200 metres relay sh	1:37.66	—N/a	Montréal, Canada	26 January 2024	
Outdoor	4 × 100 metres relay	42.17	—N/a	Gaborone, Botswana	3 May 2026	NR
Outdoor	4 × 100 metres relay Mx	40.07	—N/a	Gaborone, Botswana	2 May 2026	NR

=== International competitions ===
Representing Canada
Year	Competition	Venue	Position	Event	Time	Notes
2019	NACAC U23 Championships	Querétaro, Mexico	5th	100 m	11.52	
2019	NACAC U23 Championships	Querétaro, Mexico	2nd	4 × 100 m relay	44.28	
2024	World Indoor Championships	Glasgow, United Kingdom	17th (sf)	60 m	7.21	
2024	World Relays	Nassau, The Bahamas	7th	4 × 100 m relay	43.09	
2024	Olympic Games	Paris, France	11th (sf)	100 m	11.10	
2024	Olympic Games	Paris, France	15th (sf)	200 m	22.68	
2024	Olympic Games	Paris, France	6th	4 × 100 m relay	42.69	
2025	World Indoor Championships	Nanjing, China	11th (sf)	60 m	7.22	
2025	World Relays	Guangzhou, China	5th	4 × 100 m relay	42.46	NR
2025	NACAC Championships	Freeport, The Bahamas	8th	100 m	11.43	
2025	World Championships	Tokyo, Japan	22nd (sf)	100 m	11.34	
2025	World Championships	Tokyo, Japan	18th (sf)	200 m	22.90	
2025	World Championships	Tokyo, Japan	7th	4 × 100 m relay	42.82	
2026	World Indoor Championships	Toruń, Poland	18th (sf)	60 m	7.21	
2026	World Relays	Gaborone, Botswana	2nd	4 × 100 m relay	42.17	NR
2026	World Relays	Gaborone, Botswana	2nd	4 × 100 m relay Mx	40.23	
2026	Pan American Championships	Medellín, Colombia	1st	200 m	22.64	
2026	Commonwealth Games	Glasgow, United Kingdom	6th	100 m	11.09	
2026	Commonwealth Games	Glasgow, United Kingdom	10th (sf)	200 m	22.98	
2026	Commonwealth Games	Glasgow, United Kingdom	2nd	4 × 100 m relay	42.76	
2026	World Ultimate Championships	Budapest, Hungary	14th (sf)	100 m	11.26	
2026	World Ultimate Championships	Budapest, Hungary	4th	4 × 100 m relay Mx	40.34	

=== National titles ===
She has won ten national titles.

- Canadian U20 Indoor Championships
  - Long jump: 2017 (1)
- Canadian U20 Championships
  - 100 metres: 2018 (1)
- Canada Summer Games
  - 100 metres: 2022 (1)
  - 200 metres: 2022 (1)
- Canadian Championships
  - 100 metres: 2024, 2025, 2026 (3)
  - 200 metres: 2024, 2025, 2026 (3)
