= Desirèe Henry =

British sprinter (born 1995)

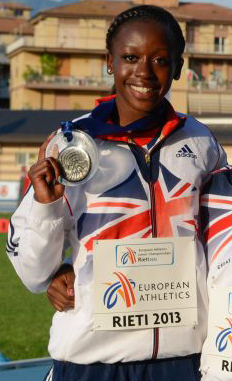
- Henry at the 2013 European Junior Championships

Personal information
- Full name: Desirèe Latifah N. Henry
- Born: 26 August 1995 (age 30) Enfield
- Height: 1.71 m (5 ft 7 in)
- Weight: 64 kg (141 lb)

Sport
- Sport: Athletics
- Events: 100 metres, 200 meters and 400 meters
- Club: Enfield & Haringey AC
- Coached by: Mike MacFarlane
Medal record
Women's athletics
Representing Great Britain
Olympic Games
Silver medal – second place	2024 Paris	4 × 100 m relay
Bronze medal – third place	2016 Rio de Janeiro	4 × 100 m relay
World Championships
Silver medal – second place	2017 London	4 × 100 m relay
European Championships
Gold medal – first place	2014 Zürich	4 × 100 m relay
Gold medal – first place	2024 Rome	4 × 100 m relay
European Junior Championships
Gold medal – first place	2013 Rieti	4 × 100 m relay
Silver medal – second place	2013 Rieti	200 m
World Youth Championships
Gold medal – first place	2011 Lille	200 m
World Relays
Gold medal – first place	2025 Guangzhou	4 × 100 m relay
Silver medal – second place	2014 Nassau	4 × 200 m relay

Desirèe Latifah N. Henry (born 26 August 1995) is a British sprinter who competes in the 100 metres and 200 metres. She won an Olympic silver medal in the women's 4 × 100 metres relay at the 2024 Summer Olympics in Paris, the bronze medal in the 4 × 100 metres relay at the 2016 Rio Games, and a silver medal in the 4 × 100 m relay at the 2017 World Athletics Championships in London.

== Early life ==
Henry was born on 26 August 1995 in Edmonton, London. She attended Highfield Primary School, St Anne's Catholic High School and City and Islington College. She is of Antiguan and Guyanese descent.

== Career ==
Henry is the 2011 World Youth Champion in the 200 meters. Her personal bests are 11.06 for the 100 meters, 22.46 for the 200 meters and 52.27 in the 400 meters all set in 2016.

Henry was one of seven young people who lit the Olympic cauldron at the London 2012 Olympic opening ceremony. All were nominated by famous British Olympians, with Henry being nominated by decathlete Daley Thompson.

She ran the anchor leg as Great Britain won the 4 × 100 metres relay at the 2014 European Championships in Zurich.

Henry improved her personal bests in 2016 to 11.06 in the 100 meters and 22.46 in the 200 meters and earned selection for the Rio Olympics. She began sprinting over 400 meters in 2015 but soon returned to shorter distances. In Rio, she reached the semifinals of the 100 metres, running 11.09, having run 11.08 in her heat. She went on to win a bronze medal in the sprint relay, setting a new British record of 41.77, along with her teammates Asha Philip, Dina Asher-Smith and Daryll Neita.

She won a silver medal as part of the 4 × 100 metres relay team at the 2017 World Athletics Championships in London and gold in the same event at the 2024 European Athletics Championships in Rome.

On 5 July 2024, Henry was named in the British 4 × 100 metres relay squad for the Paris Olympics. She won a silver medal in the event, having run on the last leg in the heats.

== International competitions ==
Year	Competition	Venue	Position	Event	Notes
Representing Great Britain
2011	World Youth Championships	Lille, France	1st	200 m	23.25
2012	World Junior Championships	Barcelona, Spain	4th	200 m	23.34
2013	European Junior Championships	Rieti, Italy	2nd	200 m	23.56
2013	European Junior Championships	Rieti, Italy	1st	4 × 100 m	43.81
2014	World Relays	Nassau, Bahamas	2nd	4 × 200 m	1:29.61
2014	World Junior Championships	Eugene, Oregon, United States	4th	100 m	11.56 (wind: -1.0 m/s)
2014	World Junior Championships	Eugene, Oregon, United States	—	4 × 100 m	DNF
2014	European Championships	Zürich, Switzerland	7th	100 m	11.43 (11.21)
2014	European Championships	Zürich, Switzerland	1st	4 × 100 m	42.24
2015	World Championships	Beijing, China	4th	4 × 100 m	42.10
2016	European Championships	Amsterdam, Netherlands	2nd (sf)	100 m	11.09^{1}
2016	Olympic Games	Rio de Janeiro, Brazil	12th (sf)	100 m	11.09
2016	Olympic Games	Rio de Janeiro, Brazil	3rd	4 × 100 m	41.77
2017	World Championships	London, United Kingdom	18th (sf)	100 m	11.24
2017	World Championships	London, United Kingdom	2nd	4 × 100 m	42.12
2019	World Relays	Yokohama, Japan	–	4 × 100 m	DNF
2024	European Championships	Rome, Italy	1st	4 × 100 m	41.91
2024	Olympic Games	Paris, France	2nd	4 × 100 m	41.85
2025	World Championships	Tokyo, Japan	4th	4 × 100 m	42.07

Note: Results in brackets indicate superior time achieved in qualifying rounds.

^{1}Did not finish in the final

Olympic Games
Preceded by Catriona Le May Doan, Steve Nash, Nancy Greene and Wayne Gretzky	Final Olympic torchbearer (with Callum Airlie, Jordan Duckitt, Katie Kirk, Cameron MacRitchie, Aidan Reynolds, and Adelle Tracey); London 2012	Succeeded by Irina Rodnina and Vladislav Tretiak
Preceded by Li Ning	Final Summer Olympic torchbearer (with Callum Airlie, Jordan Duckitt, Katie Kirk, Cameron MacRitchie, Aidan Reynolds, and Adelle Tracey); London 2012	Succeeded by Vanderlei Cordeiro de Lima
