= Amy Hunt =

British Olympic sprinter (born 2002)

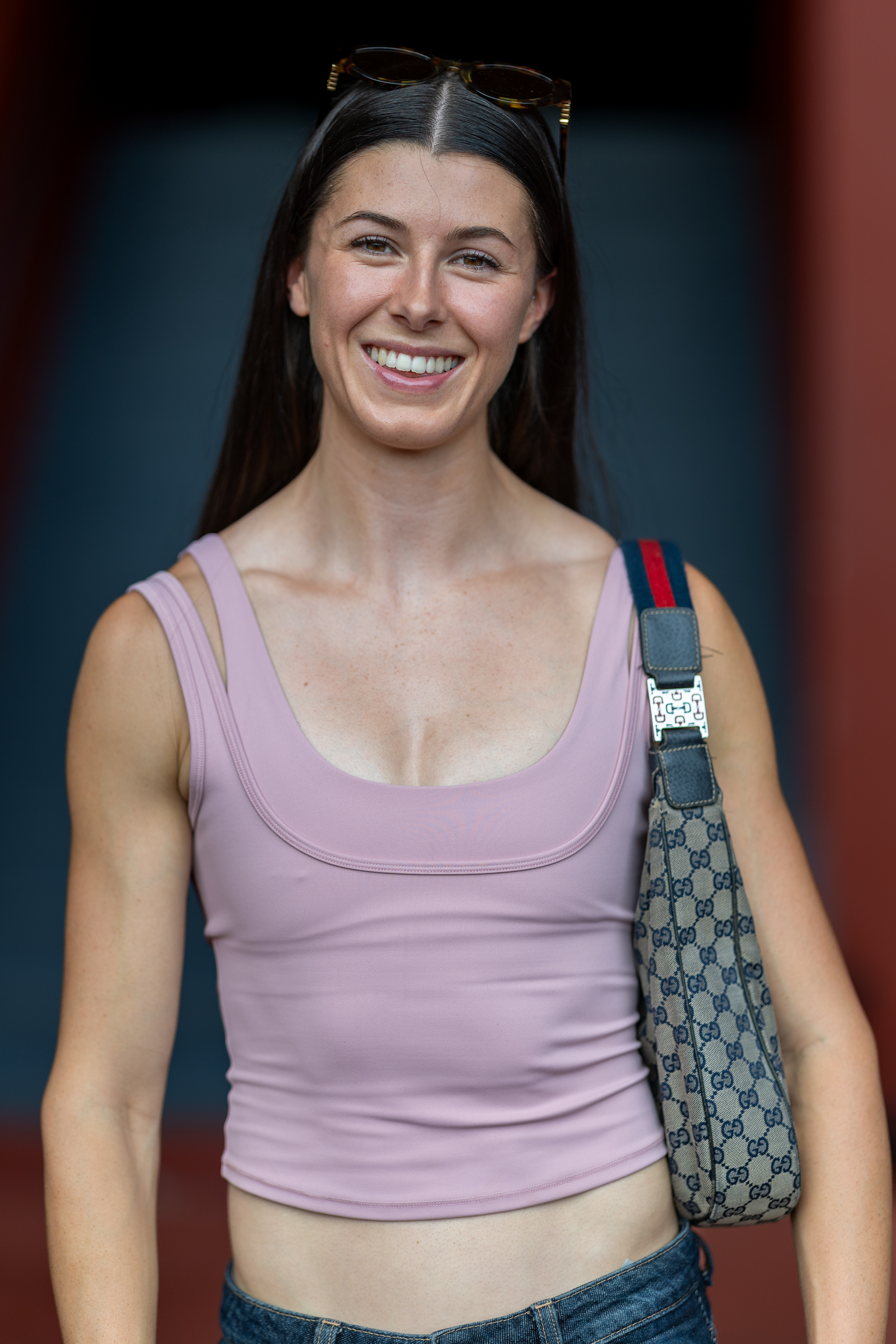
- Hunt at the 2026 Weltklasse Zürich

Personal information
- Born: 15 May 2002 (age 24) Newark, Nottinghamshire, England
- Education: Corpus Christi College, Cambridge (BA)

Sport
- Sport: Women's athletics
- Event: Sprint
- Club: Charnwood
- Coached by: Marco Airale

Achievements and titles
- Personal bests: 100 m: 10.97 (Stockholm, 2026); 200 m: 22.08 (Tokyo, 2025); Indoor; 60 m: 7.04 (Toruń, 2026)
Medal record
Women's athletics
Representing Great Britain
Olympic Games
Silver medal – second place	2024 Paris	4 × 100 m relay
World Championships
Silver medal – second place	2025 Tokyo	200 m
European Championships
Gold medal – first place	2024 Rome	4 × 100 m relay
Gold medal – first place	2026 Birmingham	100 m
Gold medal – first place	2026 Birmingham	200 m
Gold medal – first place	2026 Birmingham	4 × 100 m relay
Gold medal – first place	2026 Birmingham	4 × 100 m mixed
World Relays
Gold medal – first place	2025 Guangzhou	4 × 100 m relay
Bronze medal – third place	2024 Nassau	4 × 100 m relay
Representing England
Commonwealth Games
Silver medal – second place	2026 Glasgow	100 m

Amy Hunt (born 15 May 2002) is an English sprinter. She won the gold medal in the 100 metres, 200 metres, 4 × 100 metres relay, and 4 × 100 metres mixed relay at the 2026 European Championships, becoming the first athlete to win four gold medals at a single European Championship. She won silver in the 4 × 100 m at the 2024 Summer Olympics and silver in the 200 m at the 2025 World Athletics Championships. She holds the world record for the women's under-18 200 metres, set in June 2019 with a time of 22.42s.

== Education ==
Hunt attended Barnby Road Academy and then Kesteven and Grantham Girls' School. In 2023, she gained a BA in English from Corpus Christi College, Cambridge University. She described Cambridge as "its own crazy world", and considered dropping out at the end of each year, but could not as "I'm not a quitter". She found her tutors were not always the most supportive when it came to her athletic pursuits.

== Athletics career ==
=== Early career ===
In June 2019, Hunt rose to prominence when she ran in a 200 m junior race in Mannheim, Germany, in what was her fifth competitive race outdoors at that distance. Her time of 22.42s was a new world under-18 record. In the summer of 2019, she won gold medals in both the 200 m and 4 × 100 m at the European Under-20 Championships. Her transition into senior athletics was disrupted by COVID-19 and the rupture of her quadriceps in early 2022.

University studies and graduation saw Hunt only start training fully in early June 2023. She came 5th in the 100 m final at that year's British Championships in 11.67 s. At the European U23 Championships in Espoo, she won a gold medal in the 4 × 100 m relay. In August, she ran a new 100 m personal best of 11.13 s, to go ninth on the British all-time top lists.

=== 2024: Olympic Games debut ===
In February, Hunt won gold over 60 m at the British Indoor Championships, with a time of 7.26 s. She improved her 100 m personal best to 11.12 s at the Pure Athletics Invitational on 20 April. She finished third in the 200 metres at the Diamond League event in Stockholm in June.

Hunt won her first senior title as part of the Great Britain women's 4 × 100 m team that took gold at the European Championships in Rome on 12 June. Later that month, she finished second over 100 metres at the British Championships in Manchester, running 11.41 s. She went onto place third in the 200 m, with a time of 22.78 s.

Hunt was selected to the Great Britain 4 × 100 metres relay squad for the 2024 Summer Olympics, and helped the team win a silver medal.

=== 2025: International breakthrough ===
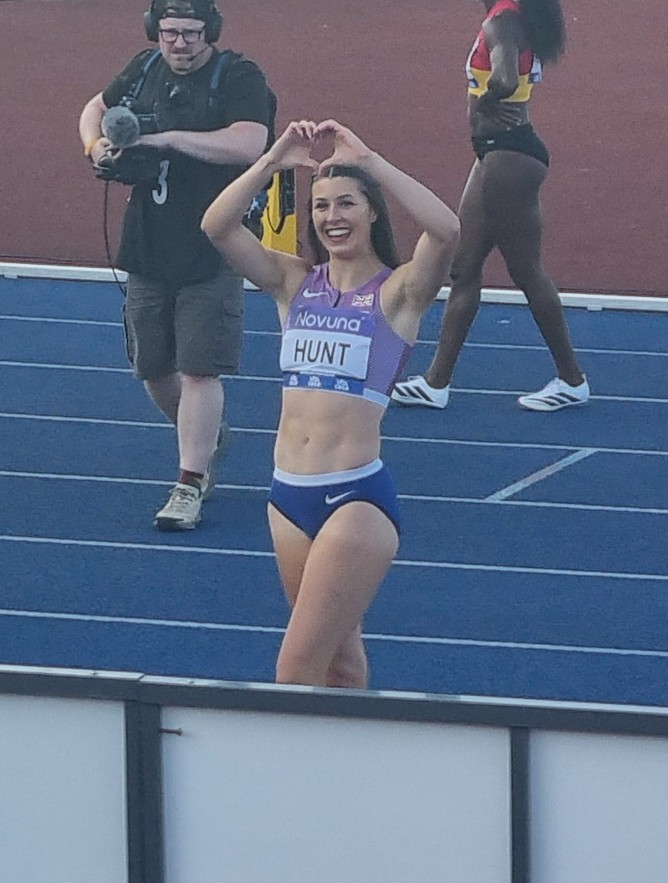
Hunt after victory at the 2025 UK Athletics Championships

She set a new 60 metres personal best of 7.18 seconds in the semi-final at the 2025 British Indoor Athletics Championships in Birmingham, on 22 February 2025, prior to finishing in fourth place overall after appearing to slip out of the blocks in the final. At the European Indoor Championships in Apeldoorn, Hunt ran a new personal best of 7.09 seconds in the 60 metres semi-final, before placing sixth in the final in a time of 7.10 seconds. She was subsequently selected for the World Indoor Championships in Nanjing, China, where she ran 7.11 seconds to finish fifth in the 60 metres final.

Hunt ran 23.06 seconds to finish fifth in the 200 metres at the Xiamen Diamond League in China, in April. She finished fourth in the 200 metres at the Shanghai Diamond League in China on 3 May, in a new seasons best time of 22.86 seconds. Hunt was a member of the Great Britain team which won gold in the women's 4 × 100 metres at the World Relays on 11 May 2025. On 16 May, she lowered her personal best to 11.03 seconds in the 100 metres race at the Doha Diamond League to move to fourth on the UK all-time list. In June, she finished second over 200 metres at the Golden Gala in Rome and the Meeting de Paris, both part of the Diamond League. She ran a personal best of 22.31 s to finish third in the 200 m at the London Diamond League on 19 July. On 2 August, Hunt won the 100 m final at the UK Championships in a new personal best of 11.02 s to claim her first British senior outdoor title. In the 200 m, Hunt narrowly finished second behind Dina Asher-Smith in a new personal best of 22.14 s.

She ran 22.61 seconds for fifth in the women's 200 m at the Diamond League Final in Zurich on 28 August. She was selected for the 100 metres and 200 metres and as part of the 4 × 100 m relay for the British team for the World Championships in Tokyo, Japan. On 19 September, Hunt took silver in the 200 m final, achieving her first global individual medal and her first medal at the World Championships.

=== 2026: Quadruple European gold medalist, sub 11 seconds 100 metres ===
Hunt (foreground) at the 2026 Bislett Games

Hunt placed second in the 60 metres at the 2026 British Indoor Athletics Championships in Birmingham on 14 February 2026, finishing behind Dina Asher-Smith in the final. Later that month at the Copernicus Cup in Toruń, she ran a personal best of 7.04 seconds for the distance, 0.01 outside Asher-Smith's national record. Hunt was a semi-finalist at the 2026 World Athletics Indoor Championships in Poland, running 7.10 seconds.

On 7 June, Hunt broke 11-seconds for the 100 metres for the first time, running 10.97 seconds (+0.8) in placing second to Melissa Jefferson-Wooden at the 2026 Bauhausgalan in Stockholm, part of the 2026 Diamond League. On 10 June, she again ran under 11 seconds, placing second behind Julien Alfred in a wind-assisted race at the 2026 Bislett Games. At the UK Championships on 20 June, she retained her 100 metres title, winning in a time of 11.01 seconds.

On 28 July, Hunt won the silver medal representing England in the 100 metres at the Commonwealth Games in Glasgow, running 10.98 seconds to finish behind race winner Zoe Hobbs of New Zealand.

On 10 August, Hunt ran a time of 11.00 seconds to win the gold medal in the 100 metres at the European Championships in Birmingham. Three days later, she won the gold in the 200 metres, clocking 22.19 seconds to complete the sprint double. On 15 August, Hunt ran the second leg as Great Britain won the women's 4 × 100 m relay to claim her third gold medal of the championship. The following day, she anchored the British team to gold in the mixed 4 × 100 m relay, becoming the first person to win four gold medals at a single European Championships.

Returning to the Diamond League on 21 August, Hunt finished in second place in the 200 metres in the Lausanne meet, after being beaten by Kayla White. On 4 September at the Diamond League final in Brussels, she placed third in the 200 metres in a season's best time of 22.16 seconds. The following day, Hunt finished second in the 100 metres. On 12 September, Hunt was a finalist in the 100 metres at the inaugural 2026 World Athletics Ultimate Championship in Budapest. The following day, she returned to compete in the 200 metres final, and finished fourth in a season’s best of 22.10 seconds.

== Personal life ==
Hunt is based in Padua, Italy, where she trains under coach Marco Airale. Before races, Hunt uses puzzle games such as Wordle and Connections to calm herself.

She described her on‑track persona as a blend of scholarship and showmanship, telling young girls they can be an “academic badass and a track goddess.” Hunt enjoys the theatricality of sprinting, calling it “gladiatorial,” and is known for her carefully designed nails.

Hunt has also discussed health challenges, including a period of low blood pressure that caused near‑fainting episodes after races and required extensive cardiac testing. She now manages the condition by monitoring her blood pressure daily, using high‑salt electrolytes, and keeping her body moving between reps.

In September 2026, after the 200 m final at the World Ultimate Championships, Hunt attracted media attention for criticizing an advert for sports betting website Novig in which actress Sydney Sweeney appeared nude. In a post-race interview, Hunt stated "This is what women in sport look like. 21.4, muscles, hard work, sweat, blood, tears." She later described the advert as "a barrier for girls in sport".

== Athletic achievements ==
=== Personal bests ===
Type	Distance	Time (s)	Wind (m/s)	Venue	Date	Notes
Individual events
Indoor	50 metres	6.20	—N/a	Ostrava, Czech Republic	3 February 2026	NR
Indoor	60 metres	7.04	—N/a	Toruń, Poland	22 February 2026	
Indoor	200 metres sh	25.22	—N/a	Sheffield, United Kingdom	14 February 2016	
Indoor	300 metres sh	37.61	—N/a	New York, United States	6 February 2022	
Indoor	400 metres sh	54.25	—N/a	Padua, Italy	2 February 2025	
Outdoor	100 metres	10.97	+0.8	Stockholm, Sweden	7 June 2026	
Outdoor	200 metres	22.08	-0.1	Tokyo, Japan	18 September 2025	
Outdoor	400 metres	53.63	—N/a	Brescia, Italy	14 June 2025	
Team events
Outdoor	4 × 100 metres relay	41.55	—N/a	London, United Kingdom	20 July 2024	NR
Outdoor	4 × 400 metres relay	3:35.92	—N/a	Milan, Italy	13 April 2024	

=== International competitions ===
Representing Great Britain & England
Year	Competition	Venue	Position	Event	Time
2018	European U18 Championships	Győr, Hungary	—	100 m	DNS
2019	European U20 Championships	Borås, Sweden	1st	200 m	22.94
2019	European U20 Championships	Borås, Sweden	1st	4 × 100 m relay	44.11
2023	European Team Championships First Division	Chorzów, Poland	—	4 × 100 m relay	DQ
2023	European U23 Championships	Espoo, Finland	1st	4 × 100 m relay	43.04
2024	World Indoor Championships	Glasgow, United Kingdom	31st (h)	60 m	7.29
2024	World Relays	Nassau, The Bahamas	3rd	4 × 100 m relay	42.80
2024	European Championships	Rome, Italy	7th	100 m	11.15
2024	European Championships	Rome, Italy	1st	4 × 100 m relay	41.91
2024	Olympic Games	Paris, France	2nd	4 × 100 m relay	41.85
2025	European Indoor Championships	Apeldoorn, Netherlands	6th	60 m	7.10
2025	World Indoor Championships	Nanjing, China	5th	60 m	7.11
2025	World Relays	Guangzhou, China	1st	4 × 100 m relay	42.21
2025	World Championships	Tokyo, Japan	9th (sf)	100 m	11.05
2025	World Championships	Tokyo, Japan	2nd	200 m	22.14
2025	World Championships	Tokyo, Japan	4th	4 × 100 m relay	42.07
2026	World Indoor Championships	Toruń, Poland	9th (sf)	60 m	7.10
2026	Commonwealth Games	Glasgow, United Kingdom	2nd	100 m	10.98
2026	European Championships	Birmingham, United Kingdom	1st	100 m	11.00
2026	European Championships	Birmingham, United Kingdom	1st	200 m	22.19
2026	European Championships	Birmingham, United Kingdom	1st	4 × 100 m relay	42.05
2026	European Championships	Birmingham, United Kingdom	1st	Mixed 4 × 100 m relay	39.97 ER
2026	World Ultimate Championship	Budapest, Hungary	8th	100 m	11.09
2026	World Ultimate Championship	Budapest, Hungary	4th	200 m	22.10 SB

=== National championships and competitions ===
Year	Competition	Venue	Position	Event	Time
2015	England Championships, U15 events	Sheffield	2nd	60 m	7.90
2016	England Indoor Championships, U15 events	Sheffield	1st	60 m	7.71
2016	England Indoor Championships, U15 events	Sheffield	1st	200 m	25.22
2016	England Championships, U15 events	Bedford	1st	100 m	11.96
2017	England Indoor Championships, U17 events	Sheffield	1st	60 m	7.43
2017	England Championships, U17 events	Bedford	1st	100 m	11.72
2018	England Indoor Championships, U20 events	Sheffield	4th	60 m	7.52
2018	England Championships, U17 events	Bedford	1st	100 m	11.56
2019	England Indoor Championships, U20 events	Sheffield	1st	60 m	7.34
2019	England Championships, U20 events	Bedford	1st	100 m	11.78
2020	British Indoor Championships	Glasgow	1st	60 m	7.39
2020	British Championships	Manchester	3rd	100 m	11.35
2021	England Championships, U20 events	Bedford	3rd	200 m	23.92
2023	England Championships, U23 events	Chelmsford	2nd	100 m	11.47
2023	British Championships	Manchester	5th	100 m	11.67
2024	British Indoor Championships	Birmingham	1st	60 m	7.26
2024	British Championships	Manchester	2nd	100 m	11.41
2024	British Championships	Manchester	3rd	200 m	22.78
2025	British Indoor Championships	Birmingham	4th	60 m	7.26
2025	British Championships	Birmingham	1st	100 m	11.02
2025	British Championships	Birmingham	2nd	200 m	22.14
2026	British Indoor Championships	Birmingham	2nd	60 m	7.15
2026	British Championships	Birmingham	1st	100 m	11.01
2026	British Championships	Birmingham	2nd	200 m	22.64

== Nominations ==
She was named by the British Athletics Writers' Association as the "young female athlete of 2019".

In January 2020, Hunt was listed by British Vogue as one of their "Faces Set To Define The Decade Ahead".
