= Magdalena Niemczyk =

Polish sprinter (born 2003)

Personal information
- Born: 25 March 2003 (age 23)

Sport
- Sport: Athletics
- Event: Sprint

Achievements and titles
- Personal best(s): 60m: 7.29 (2023); 100m: 11.33 (2025); 200m: 23.01 (2025)
Medal record
Women's athletics
Representing Poland
European U20 Championships
Bronze medal – third place	2021 Tallinn	4x100m relay

Magdalena Niemczyk (born 25 March 2003) is a Polish sprinter. She became national indoor champion in the 200 metres in 2025. She competed at the 2024 Olympic Games and the 2025 World Athletics Championships.

== Biography ==
Niemczyk is from Kolbuszowa Górna and later studied psychology in Rzeszów. She won a bronze medal with the Polish team in the 4x100 metres relay at the 2021 European Athletics U20 Championships in Tallinn, Estonia. She placed fourth with the Polish team in the 4 x 100 metres relay at the 2021 World Athletics U20 Championships in Nairobi, Kenya, where she also reached the semi-finals of the individual 100 metres. She won the Polish U20 championships in the 100 metres in 2022.

In August 2024, she competed in the 4 x 100 metres relay at the 2024 Olympic Games in Paris, France. She won the Polish Indoor Athletics Championships over 200 metres in February 2025. She ran with the Polish team at the 2025 World Athletics Relays in Guangzhou, China, in May 2025, as the 4 x 100 metres relay team won a place at the upcoming World Championships. In June 2025, she ran a new personal best of 23.01 second for the 200 metres. She subsequently ran as part of the Polish team which qualified for the final and placed eighth overall in the women's 4 x 100 metres relay at the 2025 World Athletics Championships in Tokyo, Japan.

In May 2026, she ran in the 2026 World Athletics Relays in the mixed 4 × 100 metres relay. She also ran in the women's 4 × 100 metres relay at the championships in Gaborone, Botswana.
