= Gabby Thomas =

American sprinter (born 1996)

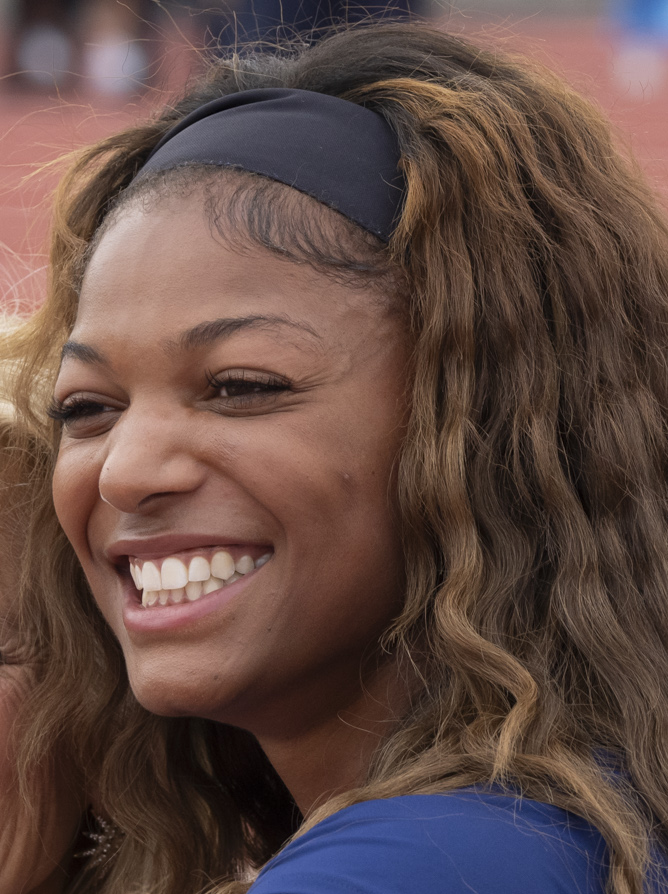
- Thomas on July 25, 2024 in Paris

Personal information
- Full name: Gabrielle Lisa Thomas
- Born: December 7, 1996 (age 29) Atlanta, Georgia, U.S.
- Home town: Northampton, Massachusetts, U.S.
- Education: Pace Academy; Harvard University; University of Texas Health Science Center at Houston
- Height: 5 ft 10 in (178 cm)

Sport
- Country: United States
- Sport: Track and field
- Event: Sprint

Achievements and titles
- Olympic finals: 2024 Paris; 200 m, Gold; 4 × 100 m, Gold; 4 × 400 m, Gold; 2020 Tokyo; 200 m, Bronze; 4 × 100 m, Silver
- Personal bests: 100 m: 10.95 (Botswana 2026); 200 m: 21.60 (Eugene 2023); 400 m: 49.14 (Kingston 2025); Long jump: 6.27 m (20 ft 6 3/4 in) (Palo Alto 2017); Indoors; 60 m: 7.21i (Fayetteville 2021); 200 m: 22.38i (College Station 2018); 300 m: 35.73i (New York 2021)
Medal record
Women's athletics
Representing the United States
Olympic Games
Gold medal – first place	2024 Paris	200 m
Gold medal – first place	2024 Paris	4 × 100 m relay
Gold medal – first place	2024 Paris	4 × 400 m relay
Silver medal – second place	2020 Tokyo	4 × 100 m relay
Bronze medal – third place	2020 Tokyo	200 m
World Championships
Gold medal – first place	2023 Budapest	4 × 100 m relay
Silver medal – second place	2023 Budapest	200 m
World Relays
Gold medal – first place	2024 Nassau	4 × 100 m relay
Gold medal – first place	2024 Nassau	4 × 400 m relay

Gabrielle Lisa Thomas (born December 7, 1996) is an American track and field athlete specializing in 100 and 200 meter sprint who is the 2024 200 m Olympic champion. Born in Georgia and raised in Massachusetts, Thomas competed in college for Harvard University before beginning a professional track career in 2018. Thomas also has a master of public health degree in epidemiology.

At the 2020 Tokyo Olympics, she won the bronze medal in the 200 m and a silver as part of the women's 4 × 100 m relay. On August 25, 2023, she claimed the 200 m silver medal in the 2023 World Athletics Championships in Budapest with a time of 21.81 seconds. She won gold as part of Team USA in the women's 4 × 100 m relay final with a championship record of 41.03 seconds. At the 2024 Summer Olympics in Paris, Thomas won three gold medals; individually in the 200 m, and alongside her teammates in the 4 × 100 m relay and 4 × 400 m relay, in which they ran an American record and the second-fastest time ever.

== Early life and background ==
Thomas was born December 7, 1996, in Atlanta, Georgia, to an American mother, Jennifer Randall, and a father, Desmond Thomas, originally from Jamaica. She has a twin brother. In 2007, Randall moved the family to Massachusetts to teach at the University of Massachusetts after completing her PhD at Emory University. While the family settled in Florence, Thomas played softball and soccer, then joined the track and field team at the Williston Northampton School. She was inspired to run by Allyson Felix, saying that her first memory of a track race was watching Felix while at her grandmother's house. In four years at her high school, Thomas set multiple school records and was most valuable player every year.

A graduate of Harvard University, she studied neurobiology and global health as an undergraduate. In May 2023, Thomas finished her master of public health degree in epidemiology at the University of Texas Health Science Center at Houston, at their Austin regional campus. She is a member of Alpha Kappa Alpha sorority.

== Career ==
While at Harvard, Thomas won 22 conference titles across her three years of athletics in six different events, setting the school and Ivy League records in the 100 meters, 200 meters and the indoor 60 meters. She signed a contract with New Balance and turned pro in October 2018, forgoing her last year of collegiate eligibility.

After Harvard, she moved to Austin, Texas, to be coached by Tonja Buford-Bailey.

Thomas (left) at the 2020 US Olympic trials.

=== 2020 ===
In 2020, Thomas was provisionally banned by the Athletics Integrity Unit after allegedly missing three anti-doping tests within a 12-month period. Her suspension was lifted in July 2020.

=== 2021 ===
In 2021 an MRI revealed a tumor on her liver, but it turned out to be benign. She represented the United States in the 200 meter race at the postponed 2020 Tokyo Olympics. Her time of 21.61 seconds at the United States Olympic trials on June 26, 2021, was the second-fastest ever at the time, surpassed only by world record holder Florence Griffith-Joyner. The time even surprised Thomas herself; after the race, she said, "It definitely changed how I view myself as a runner. I am still in shock... my dream was to make the Olympic team... Now that I've accomplished [that], I'm going to set higher goals." On August 3, 2021, in the Olympic final, Thomas won a bronze medal, running with a time of 21.87 s, behind Elaine Thompson-Herah (gold) and Christine Mboma (silver). Three days later, the U.S. team having qualified for the finals of the 4 × 100 m relay, Thomas ran anchor, and the team came in second place behind the Jamaican team, securing her the silver medal along with teammates Javianne Oliver, Teahna Daniels, and Jenna Prandini.

=== 2022 ===
In March, Thomas started her outdoor season at the Texas Relays in Austin with the fastest-ever season opener by any 200 m female sprinter. She achieved the quickest wind-assisted mark of all time at 21.69 seconds (+3.1 m/s). She ran winning 10.92 s in the 100 m just 45 minutes earlier. Thomas missed the qualifying for the home World Championships in Eugene, Oregon in July as she tore her hamstring just weeks before the USATF Championships held in June and only finished eighth in the 200 m final.

=== 2023 ===
On April 29 at the Texas Invitational in Austin, Thomas set a personal record in the 400 m with a time of 49.68 s (her previous PR was 51.15 s from May 2021). On July 9, 2023, Thomas became the US national champion for the women's 200 m sprint. On August 25, 2023, she claimed the silver medal in the 2023 World Athletics Championships in 21.81 seconds. She finished ahead of USA teammate Sha'Carri Richardson (21.92), and behind defending women's 200 m world champion Shericka Jackson (21:41 CR). She would also go on to win gold as part of Team USA in the women's 4 × 100 m relay final with a championship record of 41.03 seconds. Her teammates in this event were Tamari Davis, Twanisha Terry, and Sha'Carri Richardson.

=== 2024 ===
On June 29, 2024, Thomas qualified for the 2024 Paris Olympics by winning the U.S. Olympic Trials 200 m race with a time of 21.81. She won the 200 m at the final pre-Olympic Diamond League meeting in London, England, on July 20, with a time of 21.82. At the Olympics, she won only gold medals, including the 200 meter race with a time of 21.82, and along with her teammates in the 4 × 100 m and 4 × 400 m relays.

On September 26, she competed at the Athlos track meet, a women-only track and field meeting at Icahn Stadium in New York City, finishing second in the 200 m.

In November 2024, it was announced that Thomas had signed up for the inaugural season of the Michael Johnson founded Grand Slam Track.

=== 2025 ===
Having finished in third place in the 200 m at the 2025 USA Outdoor Track and Field Championships on Aug. 3, Thomas announced in September 2025 that she would not compete at the 2025 World Athletics Championships due to the aggravation of an Achilles tendon injury she had first sustained in May.

== Achievements ==
=== International competitions ===
Representing the United States
Year	Competition	Venue	Position	Event	Time	Notes
2019	World Relays	Yokohama, Japan	–	4 × 200 m relay	DQ	
2021	Olympic Games	Tokyo, Japan	3rd	200 m	21.87	+0.8 m/s
2021	Olympic Games	Tokyo, Japan	2nd	4 × 100 m relay	41.45	SB
2023	World Championships	Budapest, Hungary	2nd	200 m	21.81	
2023	World Championships	Budapest, Hungary	1st	4 × 100 m relay	41.03	CR
2024	World Relays	Nassau, Bahamas	1st	4 × 100 m relay	41.85	WL
2024	World Relays	Nassau, Bahamas	1st	4 × 400 m relay	3:21.70	WL
2024	Olympic Games	Paris, France	1st	200 m	21.82	
2024	Olympic Games	Paris, France	1st	4 × 100 m relay	41.78	
2024	Olympic Games	Paris, France	1st	4 × 400 m relay	3:15.27	AR
2026	World Ultimate Championship	Budapest, Hungary	2nd	200 m	21.77	

=== National championships ===
Year	Competition	Venue	Position	Event	Time	Notes
2019	USATF Indoor Championships	Staten Island, New York	2nd	300 m	35.98	
2019	USATF Championships	Des Moines, Iowa	8th	200 m	DNF	-1.2 m/s
2021	U.S. Olympic Trials	Eugene, Oregon	4th	100 m	11.15	-1.0 m/s
2021	U.S. Olympic Trials	Eugene, Oregon	1st	200 m	21.61	+1.3 m/s PB
2022	USATF Championships	Eugene, Oregon	8th	200 m	22.47	-0.3 m/s
2023	USATF Championships	Eugene, Oregon	1st	200 m	21.60	-0.4 m/s PB
2024	U.S. Olympic Trials	Eugene, Oregon	1st	200 m	21.81	+0.6 m/s
2025	USATF Championships	Eugene, Oregon	3rd	200 m	22.20	+0.5 m/s

=== Circuit performances ===
Grand Slam Track results
Slam	Race group	Event	Pl.	Time	Prize money
2025 Kingston Slam	Long sprints	200 m	1st	22.62	US$100,000
2025 Kingston Slam	Long sprints	400 m	2nd	49.14	US$100,000
2025 Miami Slam	Short sprints	100 m	4th	10.97	US$50,000
2025 Miami Slam	Short sprints	200 m	1st	21.95	US$50,000
2025 Philadelphia Slam	Short sprints	200 m	2nd	22.10	US$30,000
2025 Philadelphia Slam	Short sprints	100 m	4th	11.16	US$30,000

==== Circuit wins ====
- Diamond League
  - 2018 (200 m): Lausanne
  - 2019 (200 m): Lausanne
  - 2022 (200 m): Doha
  - 2023 (200 m): Paris
  - 2024 (200 m): London

== Awards and honors ==
- Night of Legends Award 2024: Jackie Joyner-Kersee Female Athlete of the Year
- Honorary Membership, Alpha Kappa Alpha sorority
