= Marie-Éloïse Leclair =

Canadian athlete

Personal information
- Nationality: Canadian
- Born: 10 September 2002 (age 23)
- Education: Simon Fraser University

Sport
- Sport: Athletics
- Event: Sprint

Achievements and titles
- Personal bests: 60m: 7.30s (2024); 100m: 11.38s (2024); 200m: 23.40s (2024)
Medal record
Women's athletics
Representing Canada
Commonwealth Games
Silver medal – second place	2026 Glasgow	4×100m relay
World Relay Championships
Gold medal – first place	2025 Guangzhou	Mixed 4 × 100 m relay
Silver medal – second place	2026 Gaborone	4 × 100 m relay
Silver medal – second place	2026 Gaborone	Mixed 4 × 100 m relay

Marie-Éloïse Leclair (born 10 September 2002) is a Canadian sprinter. She competed at the 2024 Summer Olympics.

== Biography ==
Whilst a student at Simon Fraser University, she was named by the Great Northwest Athletic Conference as their 2023-24 Female Athlete of the Year.

Leclair was part of the Canadian 4 × 100 m relay team that competed at the 2024 World Athletics Relays in Nassau, Bahamas, and qualified for the 2024 Olympic Games.

Leclair was selected to compete for Canada at the 2024 Summer Olympics in Paris for her Olympic debut. She was part of the 4 × 100 m sprint relay team which qualified for the final, setting a national record of 42.50 seconds.

Leclair was selected for the Canadian relay pool for the 2025 World Athletics Relays in Guangzhou, China in May 2025, where she won gold in the inaugural Mixed 4 x 100 metres relay. She was named in the Canadian team for the 2025 World Athletics Championships in Tokyo, Japan.

Leclair was selected as part of the Canada team for the 2026 World Athletics Relays in Gaborone, Botswana. In the mixed 4 x 100 metres relay she was part of the team which briefly set a new world record time of 40.07 seconds, until it was broken by Jamaica in the following heat. She also ran in the women's 4 x 100 metres relay on the opening day of the competition. The following day she again raced twice, winning the silver medal in the mixed relay as well as the women’s 4 x 100 m in which Canada won the silver medal behind Jamaica in a national record time 42.17 seconds. She was named in the Canada team for the 2026 Commonwealth Games, winning the silver medal in the women's 4 × 100 m relay. She was also a semi-finalist in the 200 metres at the women's 200 metres in Glasgow, Scotland.

== Personal life ==
She is from Montreal.
