= Tianna Bartoletta =

American track and field athlete

Tianna Madison
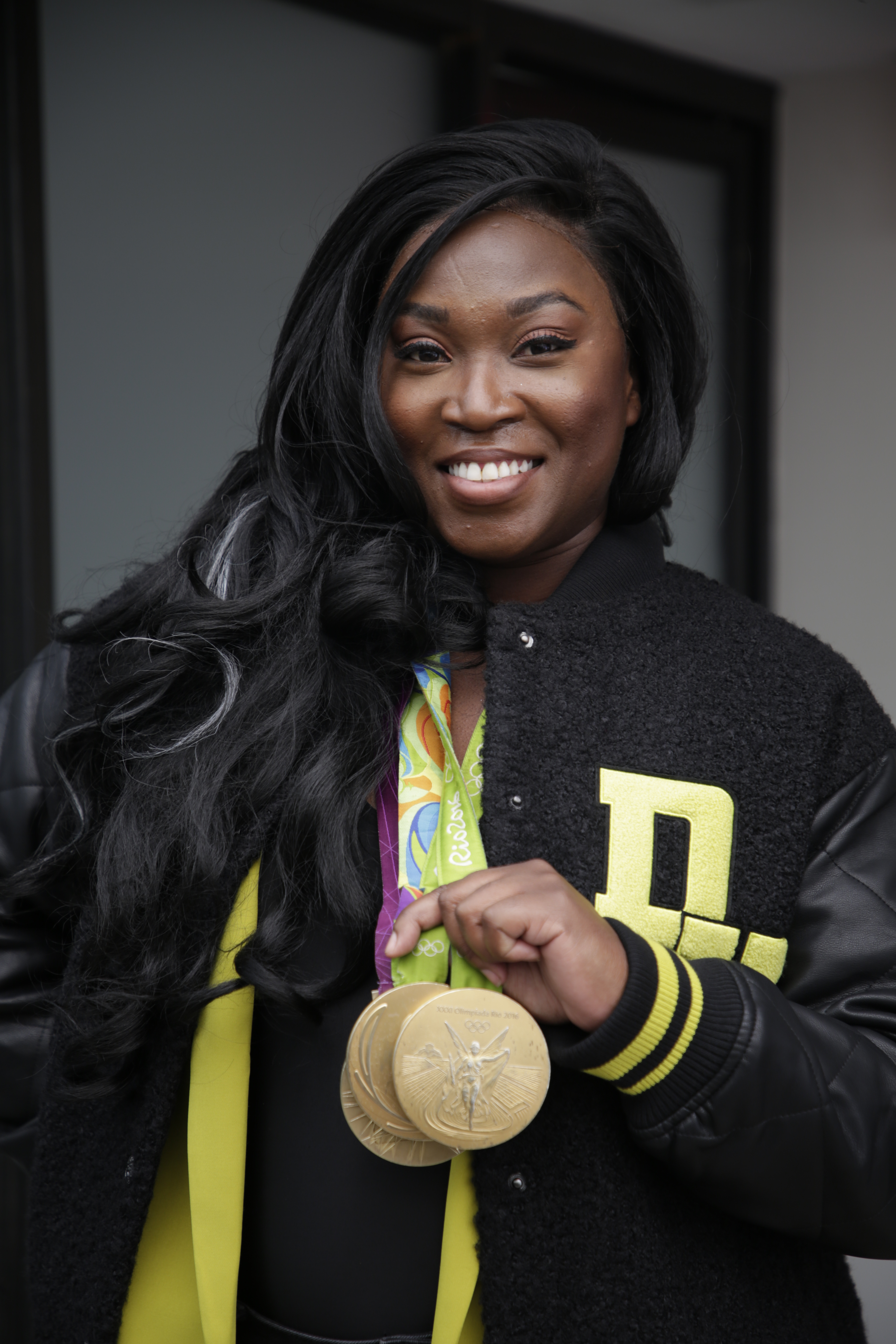
- Madison in 2025 at Black Week NYC.

Personal information
- Born: August 30, 1985 (age 41) Elyria, Ohio, U.S.
- Height: 5 ft 6 in (168 cm)
- Weight: 135 lb (61 kg)
- Website: tiannabee.com

Sport
- Country: United States
- Sport: Track & Field / Bob sled
- Events: long jump, 60 meters, 100 meters
- College team: Tennessee Vols
- Team: Nike

Achievements and titles
- Olympic finals: 2012; 100 m, 4th 4 × 100 m, Gold; 2016; 100 m, 9th (sf); Long jump, Gold; 4 × 100 m, Gold
- World finals: 2005; Long jump, Gold; 2007; Long jump, 10th 2015; Long jump, Gold; 2017; Long jump, Bronze
Medal record
Women's athletics
Representing the United States
Olympic Games
Gold medal – first place	2012 London	4 × 100 m relay
Gold medal – first place	2016 Rio de Janeiro	Long jump
Gold medal – first place	2016 Rio de Janeiro	4 × 100 m relay
World Athletics Championships
Gold medal – first place	2005 Helsinki	Long jump
Gold medal – first place	2015 Beijing	Long jump
Bronze medal – third place	2017 London	Long jump
World Indoor Championships
Gold medal – first place	2006 Moscow	Long jump
Bronze medal – third place	2012 Istanbul	60 m
Bronze medal – third place	2014 Sopot	60 m
World Relay Championships
Gold medal – first place	2014 Nassau	4 × 100 m relay
Silver medal – second place	2015 Nassau	20px Americas
Continental Cup
Gold medal – first place	2014 Marrakech	4 × 100 m relay
Bronze medal – third place	2014 Marrakech	Long jump

Tianna Bartoletta (née Madison) (born August 30, 1985) is an American track and field athlete who specializes in the long jump and short sprinting events. She is a two-time Olympian with three gold medals. At the 2012 Summer Olympics she placed fourth in the 100 m race then won her first gold by leading off the world record-setting 4 × 100 m relay team. At the 2016 Summer Olympics she won two more golds, first with a personal best to win the long jump then again leading off the victorious 4 × 100 m relay team.

Other achievements include winning the long jump World Championship in 2005 and 2015, plus the long jump World Indoor Championship in 2006. She also was a pusher on the U.S. bobsled team in 2012.

It was announced in August 2020 that Madison would be joining SPIRE Institute and Academy as an ambassador. She will be joining the others such as Ryan Lochte and Elizabeth Beisel representing the school. The goal of the partnership with SPIRE and the ambassadors is to emphasize the development of peak performance in athletics, academics, character and life.

== High school ==
Tianna Madison was born on August 30, 1985, in Elyria, Ohio. She attended local public schools, including Elyria High School. She was a member of the 2003 USA TODAY All-USA High School Girls Track Team, as well as her high school basketball and track teams. She appeared in the 2003 "Faces In The Crowd" section of Sports Illustrated, participated in the Ohio Reads program working with elementary students, made Elyria High School's High and Distinguished Honor Rolls for four years running, and was named the 2003 Gatorade Ohio High School Girls Track & Field Athlete of the Year.

Madison was named a 2002 American Track & Field Outdoor All-American. She earned nine career high school state championships, including seven in individual events, and became the third athlete in Ohio history to win four events at a state championship meet two years in a row (Susan Nash 1983–84 and Jesse Owens 1932–33). Her team won the Ohio Division I team title in 2003, and Team district titles all four years. Madison won her third Ohio long jump crown and set a state outdoor record and state-meet best in 2003, while claiming state 100 m titles in 2002 and 2003 and winning the Ohio 200 m championships. She anchored the 4 × 100 m relay to victory in both 2002 and 2003, setting state records. She set the indoor mark in 2002 and is fourth on the all-time girls' indoor long jump list.

Madison won the Intermediate Girls Division at the USA Track & Field Junior Olympic Championships in 2001. She set meet records at the 2002 Nike Indoor Classic and the Adidas Outdoor Championships in 2003. She also won the Volunteer Indoor Track Classic and the 2003 USATF Junior Championships.

== Collegiate career ==
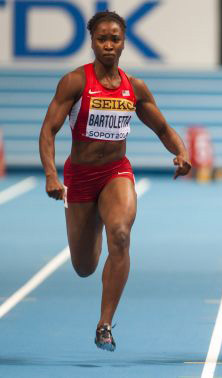
Madison at the 2014 World Indoor Championships

Madison attended the University of Tennessee. She won the SEC Indoor Long Jump, SEC Outdoor Long Jump, NCAA Indoor Long Jump, and NCAA Outdoor Long Jump titles, and both Indoor and Outdoor All-America honors. She was named Academic All-SEC and a member of the Lady Vol Academic Honor Roll.

Madison is currently third all-time on University of Tennessee's indoor performer lists in the 60 m dash and long jump, fifth all-time in the triple jump and 55m, and sixth in the 200 m.

Madison was selected as the SEC Freshman Outdoor Field Events Athlete of the Year. She also won the long jump and 55m at the SEC Invitational, the long jump at the Penn State National Open, the Sea Ray Relays, the Knoxville Invitational, the Gatorade Classic, and ran the opening 200-meter leg that set collegiate, meet, stadium and school records in the sprint medley baton event at the Penn Relays for Tennessee.

She is ranked first all-time in Tennessee’s history of the outdoor long jump at 6.89 meters (22 ft 7.5 in).

== Professional career ==
In August 2005, Madison won the gold medal at the 2005 World Outdoor Championships in Athletics with a then personal best distance of 6.89 meters.

In 2006, Madison won the silver medal at the World Indoor Championships of Athletics with a jump of 6.80 meters. Her medal was elevated to gold when the Russian winner Tatyana Kotova was disqualified for using performance-enhancing drugs.

Madison won a gold medal at the 2012 Olympics in London in the women's 4 × 100 relay. She ran the lead-off leg in the final, in which the U.S. team set a world record. She also competed in the individual 100 meter event. She reached the final, finishing fourth with a personal best time of 10.85.

In 2014, Madison was crowned USA outdoor champion in the 100 m, USA indoor champion in the 60 m, and USA outdoor long jump runner-up. In 2015, Madison defended her title as the USA indoor champion in the 60 m and was ranked number 1 in the world in the women's long jump.

On August 28, 2015, Madison won the gold medal in the women's long jump at the 2015 World Outdoor Championships of Athletics, with a personal best distance of 7.14 meters, 10 years after her first triumph.

On August 17, 2016, Madison came in as one of the favourites in the Women's Long Jump as she was the reigning world champion. Other favourites were compatriot Brittney Reese, reigning Olympic Champion and world leader, Ivana Španović, the best non- American Long Jumper, and Daria Klishina, Russia's sole track&field representative. Madison did not disappoint, winning her first Olympic title with a personal best jump of 7.17m.

In August 2020, SPIRE Institute and Academy signed Madison to become a track and field ambassador. As an ambassador she will lead and instruct select classes.

== Bobsledding ==
In October 2012, Madison was named to the U.S. National bobsled team. Madison was one of three track and field Olympians (along with Lolo Jones and Hyleas Fountain) invited to the U.S. women's bobsled push championship by coach Todd Hays. Jones and Madison made the bobsled team, giving them a chance to earn a spot on the bobsled World Cup circuit. On November 9, 2012, Madison and teammate Elana Meyers placed third in Madison's first career World Cup bobsledding competition.

== Personal life ==
Tianna Madison married John Bartoletta in 2016 but began going by her married surname after the Olympics in 2012. They resided near Tampa, Florida. She credited John for reviving her athletic career. Tianna separated from her husband in May 2017. The two divorced in 2020.

In the lead-up to the 2012 Olympics, Madison publicly claimed to have been molested by another student in high school and experienced other problems with her parents. They ended up suing her and her husband for defamation in September. However, the lawsuit was dismissed in March 2013.

In Fall 2021, Madison was inducted into Sigma Gamma Rho sorority.

== Organization ==
Madison is the founder and president of Club 360, a program helping young women build successful lives by enabling them to broaden their experiences and make educated decisions.
