= 2023 European Athletics U23 Championships – Women's 400 metres =

Women's 400 metres at the 2023 European Athletics U23 Championships
- Venue: Leppävaara Stadium
- Location: Espoo, Finland
- Dates: 13 July (heats & semi-finals); 14 July (final)
- Competitors: 25 from 16 nations
- Winning time: 51.04

Medalists
gold medal	Yemi Mary John	Great Britain
silver medal	Henriette Jæger	Norway
bronze medal	Keely Hodgkinson	Great Britain

The women's 400 metres event at the 2023 European Athletics U23 Championships was held in Espoo, Finland, at Leppävaara Stadium on 13 and 14 July.

== Records ==
Prior to the competition, the records were as follows:

European U23 record	Marita Koch (GDR)	48.60	Turin, Italy	4 August 1979
Championship U23 record	Olga Zaytseva (RUS)	50.72	Erfurt, Germany	16 July 2005

== Results ==
=== Heats ===
First 3 in each heat (Q) and the next 4 fastest (q) will qualify for the semi-finals.

==== Heat 1 ====
Place	Athlete	Nation	Time	Notes
1	Catia Gubelmann	Switzerland	52.51	Q, PB
2	Carmen Avilés	Spain	52.61	Q, PB
3	Ilaria Accame	Italy	52.61	Q, PB
4	Zoë Sedney	Netherlands	52.72	q
5	Anna Orlova	Ukraine	54.20	PB

==== Heat 2 ====
Place	Athlete	Nation	Time	Notes
1	Yemi Mary John	Great Britain	53.16	Q
2	Giulia Senn	Switzerland	53.51	Q
3	Veronika Drljacic	Croatia	53.83	Q
4	Tetiana Kharashchuk	Ukraine	54.06	q
5	Virág Simon	Hungary	54.46	
6	Sigrid Kongssund Amlie	Norway	56.03	
7	Carlota Morán	Andorra	58.79	

==== Heat 3 ====
Place	Athlete	Nation	Time	Notes
1	Berta Segura	Spain	53.22	Q
2	Henriette Jæger	Norway	53.65	Q
3	Aleksandra Formella	Poland	53.67	Q
4	Eleonora Foudraz	Italy	53.72	q
5	Ajda KaučIč	Slovenia	54.93	
6	Wanessa Jankowa	Bulgaria	57.01	SB

==== Heat 4 ====
Place	Athlete	Nation	Time	Notes
1	Keely Hodgkinson	Great Britain	53.08	Q
2	Katriina Wright	Finland	53.72	Q
3	Lakeri Ertzgaard	Norway	53.87	Q
4	Laura Elena Rami	Italy	54.11	q
5	Aline Yuille	Switzerland	54.32	PB
6	Emma Matyus	Romania	55.31	

=== Semi-finals ===
First 3 in each heat (Q) and the next 2 fastest (q) will qualify for the final.

==== Heat 1 ====
Place	Athlete	Nation	Time	Notes
1	Zoë Sedney	Netherlands	52.11	Q, PB
2	Keely Hodgkinson	Great Britain	52.44	Q
3	Katriina Wright	Finland	52.92	Q
4	Berta Segura	Spain	52.95	q
5	Lakeri Ertzgaard	Norway	52.97	q, SB
6	Catia Gubelmann	Switzerland	53.13	
7	Ilaria Accame	Italy	53.19	
8	Laura Elena Rami	Italy	54.49	

==== Heat 2 ====
Place	Athlete	Nation	Time	Notes
1	Yemi Mary John	Great Britain	51.80	Q
2	Henriette Jæger	Norway	52.78	Q
3	Giulia Senn	Switzerland	53.20	Q
4	Carmen Avilés	Spain	53.56	
5	Veronika Drljacic	Croatia	53.83	
6	Tetiana Kharashchuk	Ukraine	54.55	
7	Eleonora Foudraz	Italy	54.64	
8	Aleksandra Formella	Poland	54.78	

=== Final ===
Place	Lane	Athlete	Nation	Time	Notes
1st place, gold medalist(s)	7	Yemi Mary John	Great Britain	51.04	PB
2nd place, silver medalist(s)	6	Henriette Jæger	Norway	51.06	NR
3rd place, bronze medalist(s)	5	Keely Hodgkinson	Great Britain	51.76	PB
4	4	Zoë Sedney	Netherlands	52.02	PB
5	3	Giulia Senn	Switzerland	52.33	
6	8	Katriina Wright	Finland	52.65	
7	2	Lakeri Ertzgaard	Norway	52.95	SB
8	1	Berta Segura	Spain	53.56	
