= Henriette Jæger =

Norwegian athlete (born 2003)

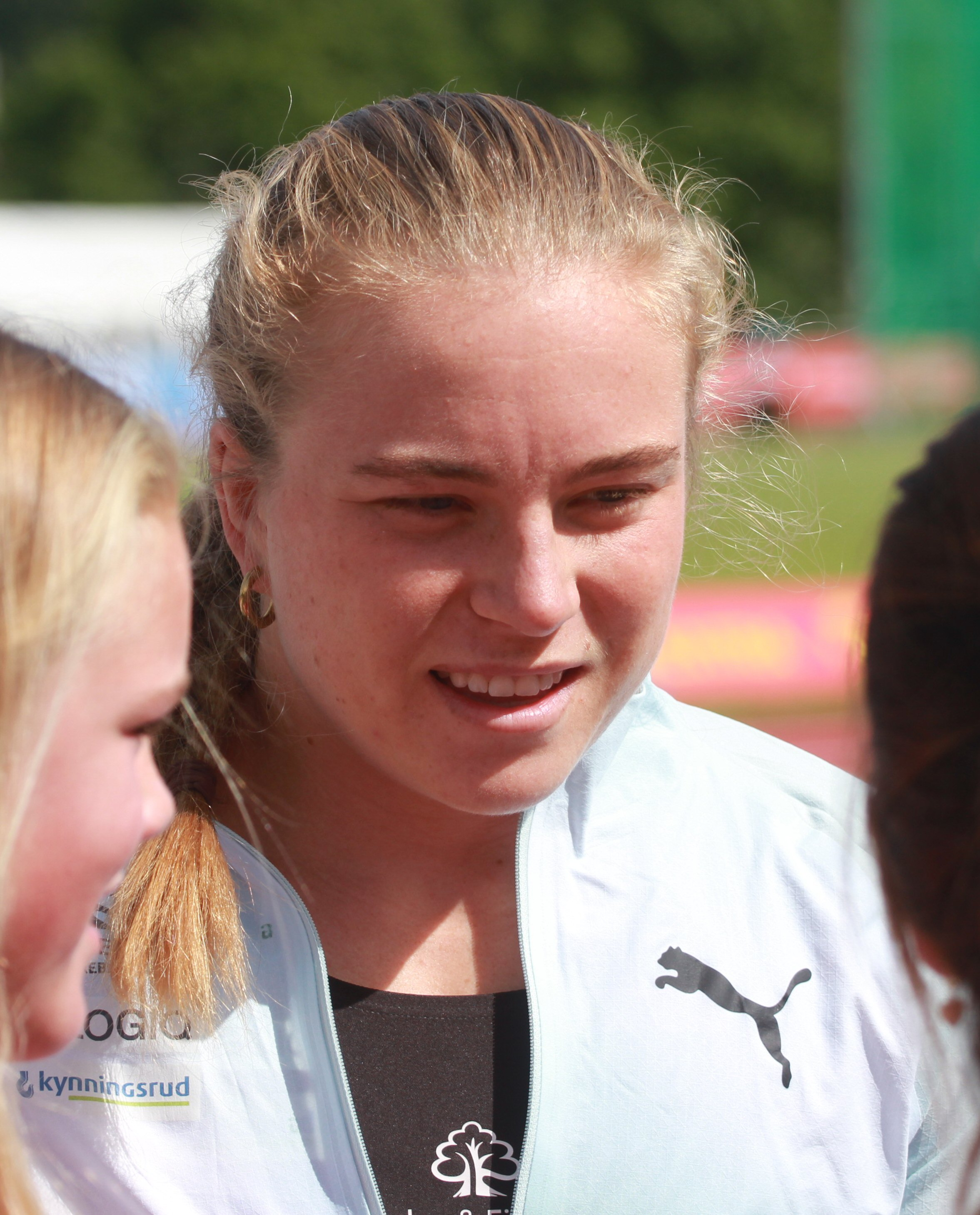
- Jæger in 2026

Personal information
- Nationality: Norwegian
- Born: 30 June 2003 (age 23) Aremark, Norway

Sport
- Sport: Athletics
- Event: 400 metres
- Club: Aremark IF
- Coached by: Unn Merete Jæger

Achievements and titles
- Personal bests: 200 m: 22.58 (2024, NR); 300 m: 35.46 (2024, NR); 400 m: 48.78 (2026, NR); 400 m sh: 50.44 (2025, NR)
Medal record
Women's athletics
Representing Norway
World Ultimate Championship
Second place	2026 Budapest	400 m
World Indoor Championships
Bronze medal – third place	2025 Nanjing	400 m
European Championships
Gold medal – first place	2026 Birmingham	400 m
Gold medal – first place	2026 Birmingham	4 × 400 m mixed
European Indoor Championships
Silver medal – second place	2025 Apeldoorn	400 m
World Relays
Gold medal – first place	2026 Gaborone	4 × 400 m relay
European U23 Championships
Gold medal – first place	2025 Bergen	400 m
Silver medal – second place	2025 Bergen	200 m
Silver medal – second place	2023 Espoo	400 m
Youth Olympic Festival
Silver medal – second place	2019 Baku	Heptathlon

Henriette Jæger (born 30 June 2003) is a Norwegian track and field athlete. She is a multiple time national champion, and former U18 world record holder. In 2023, she became the Norwegian record holder over 400 metres. In 2025, she won the silver medal at that distance at the 2025 European Athletics Indoor Championships, and bronze at the 2025 World Athletics Indoor Championships.

== Biography ==
=== Young heptathlete ===
From Aremark, Jæger was 14 years-old when she came in third at the Norwegian senior indoor championships over 200 metres, in February 2018. As a 14-year-old at the Baltic Athletics Championships in 2018, she broke the Norwegian record for girls aged 15 in the heptathlon - that had stood since 1986 - with a score of 5352 points. Competing in Fagernes in 2020, she broke 6000 points for the heptathlon for the first time. In September 2020, she broke the world U18 Heptathlon record with 6301 points, surpassing María Vicente’s record score from 2018. Jæger set a new Norwegian U20 heptathlon record in Gotzis in May 2021 of 6154 points.

=== 2022–2023: Junior 400 m medalist ===
Jæger finished in fourth place in the 400 meters at the 2022 World Athletics U20 Championships held in Cali, Colombia with a time of 52.23 seconds.

Competing at the 2023 European Athletics U23 Championships held from in July 2023 in Espoo, Finland, she won a silver medal in the 400 m after a close battle with Yemi Mary John, with Keely Hodgkinson in third. Her time of 51.06s set a Norwegian record over the distance.

=== 2024: Olympic and World Indoor finalist ===
In January 2024, she set a new national record in the 200 metres indoors running 22.99 in Baerum. At the 2024 Copernicus Cup in February 2024, she set a new 400 m personal best, and a new national record, running 51.05. She competed in the 400 metres at the 2024 World Athletics Championships in Glasgow and reached the semi-finals. She ran as part of the Norwegian 4 × 400 m relay team which qualified for the 2024 Paris Olympics, at the 2024 World Relays Championships in Nassau, Bahamas.

In June 2024, in Rome, she became the first Norwegian woman to reach the final of the 200 metres at the European Athletics Championships for 78 years winning her semi final in 22.71 seconds. She finished fourth in the final having run 22.83 seconds. Later that month, she won both the 200 m and 400 m at the Norwegian Athletics Championships. She ran a new 400 m personal best of 49.85 seconds in La Chaux-de-Fonds in July 2024.

She qualified for the final at the 2024 Summer Olympics over 400 metres in August 2024, finishing in eighth place.

=== 2025: World and European Indoor medalist ===
She ran under 51 seconds for the 400 metres for first time indoors with a Norwegian indoor record of 50.44 at the Copernicus Cup on 16 February 2025. The following weekend, she completed a 200/400 m double at the Norwegian Indoor Championships. On 8 March 2025, she ran 50.45 seconds to win the silver medal in the 400 metres at the 2025 European Athletics Indoor Championships in Apeldoorn. She won the bronze medal in the final of the 400 metres at the 2025 World Athletics Indoor Championships in Nanjing, running 50.92 seconds.

She placed third in the 200 metres at the 2025 Shanghai Diamond League. She helped the Norwegian women's 4 × 400 metres relay team set a new national record in finishing fourth overall at the 2025 World Athletics Relays in China. In June 2025, she ran 49.62 seconds to set a new Norwegian national record for the 400 metres at the 2025 Bislett Games, Oslo. Three days later she was runner-up in the 400 metres at the 2025 BAUHAUS-galan event in Stockholm, both part of the 2025 Diamond League. On 29 June 2025 she anchored the Norwegian mixed 4 × 400 metres team to victory to help Norway achieve promotion from the 2025 European Athletics Team Championships Second Division in Maribor. She ran a championship record of 49.74 seconds to win the gold medal in the 400 metres at the 2025 European Athletics U23 Championships in Bergen in her native Norway. She also won the silver medal in the 200 metres at the championships. The following month she recorded a Diamond League victory winning in 50.09 seconds over 400 metres at the 2025 Athletissima event in Lausanne in wet conditions. She placed third in a national record 49.49 seconds for the 400 metres at the Diamond League Final in Zurich on 28 August.

Competing at the 2025 World Athletics Championships in Tokyo, she qualified for the final and placed seventh overall in the women's 400 metres.

=== 2026: European champion ===
In March, she was a finalist over 400 metres at the 2026 World Athletics Indoor Championships in Toruń, Poland. Competing at the 2026 World Athletics Relays in Gaborone, Botswana, Jaeger helped the Norwegian women's 4 × 400 metres team run a national record of 3:22.78 in the qualifying round on 2 May. The following day, she ran the anchor leg as they improved the national record to 3:20.96 to win the gold medal in the women’s 4 × 400 m final. On 4 June at the 2026 Golden Gala in Rome, she won the 400 metres in 49.60 seconds, and the following week won in 49.52 at the 2026 Bislett Games. Competing at the 2026 London Athletics Meet on 18 July, Jaeger improved her Norwegian record to 49.15 seconds.

On the opening day of the 2026 European Championships in Birmingham, she won a gold medal in the mixed 4 × 400 metres relay alongside Karsten Warholm, Amalie Iuel and Andreas Ofstad Kulseng on 10 August, with the quartet setting a new championship record time of 3:09.62. Later at the championships, she won a second gold medal with a dominant win in the 400 metres final, running a new national record of 49.04 seconds and winning by a second over Natalia Bukowiecka of Poland. At the 2026 Diamond League Final in Brussels on 5 September, she placed second over 400 metres to Marileidy Paulino. The following week, she also placed second to Paulino at the inaugural World Ultimate Championship in Budapest, and again on 18 September when she ran a new Norwegian national record of 48.78 seconds at Athlos in London, the fastest performance by a European athlete since Marie-Jose Perec won the 1996 Olympics. She was nominated for women’s European Athlete of the Year for 2026.

== Competition results ==
All information from World Athletics profile.

=== International competitions ===
Representing Norway
Year	Competition	Venue	Position	Event	Result	Notes
2019	European Youth Olympic Festival	Baku, Azerbaijan	2nd	Heptathlon	5835 pts	
2019	European Youth Olympic Festival	Baku, Azerbaijan	5th	Medley relay	2:11.21	
2022	World U20 Championships	Cali, Colombia	4th	400 m	52.23	
2023	European Indoor Championships	Istanbul, Turkey	8th (sf)	400 m	53.08	
2023	European Team Championships First Division	Chorzów, Poland	7th	400 m	51.66	PB
2023	European Team Championships First Division	Chorzów, Poland	−	4 × 100 m relay	DQ	
2023	European Team Championships First Division	Chorzów, Poland	10th	4 × 400 m relay mixed	3:15.67	
2023	European U23 Championships	Espoo, Finland	2nd	400 m	51.06	NR
2023	European U23 Championships	Espoo, Finland	5th	4 × 400 m relay	3:31.51	NU23R
2023	World Championships	Budapest, Hungary	23rd (h)	400 m	51.33	
2024	World Indoor Championships	Glasgow, United Kingdom	6th (sf)	400 m	51.48	
2024	World Relays	Nassau, Bahamas	5th	4 × 400 m relay	3:26.88	NR
2024	European Championships	Rome, Italy	4th	200 m	22.83	
2024	Olympic Games	Paris, France	8th	400 m	49.96	
2025	European Indoor Championships	Apeldoorn, Netherlands	2nd	400 m	50.45	
2025	World Indoor Championships	Nanjing, China	3rd	400 m	50.92	
2025	World Relays	Guangzhou, China	4th	4 × 400 m relay	3:25.35	NR
2025	European U23 Championships	Bergen, Norway	2nd	200 m	22.78	
2025	European U23 Championships	Bergen, Norway	1st	400 m	49.74	
2025	European U23 Championships	Bergen, Norway	6th	4 × 400 m relay	3:30.88	NU23R
2025	World Championships	Tokyo, Japan	7th	400 m	49.74	
2025	World Championships	Tokyo, Japan	6th	4 × 400 m relay	3:23.71	NR
2026	World Indoor Championships	Toruń, Poland	7th	400 m	51.50	
2026	World Relays	Gaborone, Botswana	1st	4 × 400 m relay	3:20.96	NR
2026	European Championships	Birmingham, United Kingdom	1st	Mixed 4 × 400 m relay	3:09.62	CR, NR
2026	European Championships	Birmingham, United Kingdom	1st	400 m	49.04	NR
2026	World Athletics Ultimate Championship	Budapest, Hungary	2nd (Note: At this championship, the top three athletes don't receive medals, only the winner receives a trophy.)	400 m	49.28	
2026	World Athletics Ultimate Championship	Budapest, Hungary	5th	4 × 400 m mixed	3:11.31	(48.81 split)
