= 2023 European Athletics U23 Championships – Women's 4 × 400 metres relay =

Women's 4 × 400 metres relay at the 2023 European Athletics U23 Championships
- Venue: Leppävaara Stadium
- Location: Espoo, Finland
- Dates: 15 July (heats); 16 July (final)
- Competitors: 55 from 12 nations
- Winning time: 3:30.60

Medalists
gold medal	Lea Thery-Demarque; Cassandra Delaunay-Belleville; Pauline Toriel; Louise Maraval; Marina Lasserre	France
silver medal	Michelle Gröbli; Lena Wernli; Giulia Senn; Catia Gubelmann; Aline Yuille	Switzerland
bronze medal	Rocio Arroyo; Berta Segura; Blanca Hervás; Carmen Avilés; Ana Garitaonandia	Spain

The women's 4 × 400 metres relay event at the 2023 European Athletics U23 Championships was held in Espoo, Finland, at Leppävaara Stadium on 15 and 16 July.

== Records ==
Prior to the competition, the records were as follows:

European U23 record	Russia (RUS)	3:26.58	Debrecen, Hungary	15 July 2007
Championship U23 record	Russia (RUS)	3:26.58	Debrecen, Hungary	15 July 2007

== Results ==
=== Round 1 ===
Qualification rule: First 3 in each heat (Q) and the next 2 fastest (q) advance to the Final.

Rank	Heat	Nation	Athletes	Time	Notes
1	2	Switzerland	Michelle Gröbli, Lena Wernli, Aline Yuille, Catia Gubelmann	3:34.65	Q, SB
2	2	Spain	Rocio Arroyo, Blanca Hervás, Ana Garitaonandia, Carmen Avilés	3:34.68	Q, SB
3	1	Poland	Kinga Gacka, Aleksandra Formella, Wiktoria Drozd, Aleksandra Wołczak	3:34.74	Q, SB
4	1	France	Lea Thery-Demarque, Cassandra Delaunay-Belleville, Pauline Toriel, Marina Lasserre	3:35.07	Q, SB
5	2	Germany	Annkathrin Hoven, Brenda Cataria-Byll, Emilia Grahle, Mona Mayer	3:35.09	Q, SB
6	1	Ukraine	Anna Orlova, Svitlana Zhulzhyk, Mariya Buryak, Tetiana Kharashchuk	3:35.84	Q, SB
7	2	Finland	Olivia Heino, Katriina Wright, Heidi Salminen, Veera Mattila	3:36.18	q, SB
8	1	Norway	Astri Ertzgaard, Anniken Årebrot, Marin Stray Gautadottir, Sigrid Kongssund Amlie	3:36.66	q, SB
9	1	Italy	Eleonora Foudraz, Alexandra Almici, Beatrice Zeli, Laura Elena Rami	3:36.94	SB
10	2	Croatia	Rahela Leščak, Nina Vuković, Natalija Švenda, Veronika Drljačić	3:39.40	SB
11	2	Greece	Elimpiona Zenegia, Vasiliki-Paraskevi Mitsiouli, Laoura Zenegia, Georgia-Maria Despollari	3:40.62	NU20R
12	1	Czech Republic	Kateřina Šmilauerová, Lenka Čechová, Zuzana Cymbálová, Lucie Zavadilová	3:42.74	SB

=== Final ===
Rank	Nation	Athletes	Time	Notes
1st place, gold medalist(s)	France	Lea Thery-Demarque, Cassandra Delaunay-Belleville, Pauline Toriel, Louise Maraval	3:30.60	EU23L
2nd place, silver medalist(s)	Switzerland	Michelle Gröbli, Lena Wernli, Giulia Senn, Catia Gubelmann	3:30.62	NU23R
3rd place, bronze medalist(s)	Spain	Rocio Arroyo, Berta Segura, Blanca Hervás, Carmen Avilés	3:31.11	NU23R
4	Poland	Kinga Gacka, Aleksandra Formella, Nikola Horowska, Wiktoria Drozd	3:31.38	SB
5	Norway	Astri Ertzgaard, Andrea Rooth, Marin Stray Gautadottir, Henriette Jæger	3:31.51	NU23R
6	Finland	Heidi Salminen, Katriina Wright, Aada Aho, Veera Mattila	3:33.57	SB
7	Germany	Annkathrin Hoven, Brenda Cataria-Byll, Emilia Grahle, Mona Mayer	3:34.02	SB
8	Ukraine	Anna Orlova, Svitlana Zhulzhyk, Mariya Buryak, Tetiana Kharashchuk	3:36.60	
