= 2023 European Athletics U23 Championships – Women's 800 metres =

Women's 800 metres at the 2023 European Athletics U23 Championships
- Venue: Leppävaara Stadium
- Location: Espoo, Finland
- Dates: 13 July (heats); 14 July (final)
- Competitors: 20 from 15 nations
- Winning time: 2:02.96

Medalists
gold medal	Daniela García	Spain
silver medal	Veera Mattila	Finland
bronze medal	Georgia-Maria Despollari	Greece

The women's 800 metres event at the 2023 European Athletics U23 Championships was held in Espoo, Finland, at Leppävaara Stadium on 13 and 14 July.

== Records ==
Prior to the competition, the records were as follows:

European U23 record	Keely Hodgkinson (GBR)	1:55.77	Paris, France	9 June 2023
Championship U23 record	Yelena Kofanova (RUS)	1:58.94	Kaunas, Lithuania	18 July 2009

== Results ==
=== Heats ===
First 3 in each heat (Q) and the next 2 fastest (q) will qualify for the final.

==== Heat 1 ====
Place	Athlete	Nation	Time	Notes
1	Daniela García	Spain	2:06.08	Q
2	Veera Mattila	Finland	2:06.29	Q
3	Lucia Sturm	Germany	2:06.30	Q
4	Julia Cherot	France	2:06.56	
5	Caroline Bredlinger	Austria	2:07.14	
6	Hana Grobovšek	Slovenia	2:07.74	
7	Anne Gine Løvnes	Norway	2:08.40	
8	Julia Nielsen	Sweden	2:08.65	
—	Pernille Karlsen Antonsen	Norway	DQ	

==== Heat 2 ====
Place	Athlete	Nation	Time	Notes
1	Georgia-Maria Despollari	Greece	2:04.53	Q
2	Nina Vuković	Croatia	2:04.66	Q, PB
3	Wilma Nielsen	Sweden	2:04.71	Q
4	Veronika Sadek	Slovenia	2:04.90	q
5	Invida Mauriņa	Latvia	2:04.93	q, PB
6	Sophia Volkmer	Germany	2:05.09	
7	Anniken Årebrot	Norway	2:06.14	PB
8	Federica Pansini	Italy	2:07.57	
9	Switlana Schulschyk	Ukraine	2:09.75	
10	Hédi Heffner	Hungary	2:12.55	

=== Final ===
Place	Athlete	Nation	Time	Notes
1st place, gold medalist(s)	Daniela García	Spain	2:02.96	
2nd place, silver medalist(s)	Veera Mattila	Finland	2:03.14	PB
3rd place, bronze medalist(s)	Georgia-Maria Despollari	Greece	2:04.14	
4	Lucia Sturm	Germany	2:04.58	
5	Nina Vuković	Croatia	2:04.60	PB
6	Wilma Nielsen	Sweden	2:04.66	
7	Veronika Sadek	Slovenia	2:05.11	
8	Invida Mauriņa	Latvia	2:06.92	
