= 2023 European Athletics U23 Championships – Women's 400 metres hurdles =

Women's 400 metres hurdles at the 2023 European Athletics U23 Championships
- Venue: Leppävaara Stadium
- Location: Espoo, Finland
- Dates: 14 July (heats); 15 July (semi-finals); 16 July (final)
- Competitors: 40 from 20 nations
- Winning time: 55.78

Medalists
gold medal	Andrea Rooth	Norway
silver medal	Elena Carraro	France
bronze medal	Lena Pressler	Austria

The women's 400 metres hurdles event at the 2023 European Athletics U23 Championships was held in Espoo, Finland, at Leppävaara Stadium on 14 and 16 July.

== Records ==
Prior to the competition, the records were as follows:

European U23 record	Femke Bol (NED)	52.03	Tokyo, Japan	4 August 2021
Championship U23 record	Emma Zapletalová (SVK)	54.28	Tallinn, Estonia	10 July 2021

== Results ==
=== Round 1 ===
Qualification rule: First 2 in each heat (Q) and the next 6 fastest (q) advance to the Semi-Finals.

Rank	Heat	Name	Nationality	Time	Notes
1	1	Lena Preßler	Austria	57.60	Q
2	5	Carla García	Spain	57.65	Q
3	5	Louise Maraval	France	57.83	Q
4	5	Hanna Karlsson	Sweden	57.97	q, SB
5	1	Aada Aho	Finland	57.99	Q, PB
6	3	Ester Bendová	Czech Republic	58.04	Q
7	1	Salome Hüsler	Switzerland	58.07	q
8	2	Andrea Rooth	Norway	58.10	Q
9	5	Alessia Seramondi	Italy	58.14	q
10	5	Heidi Salminen	Finland	58.20	q
11	2	Juliana Guerreiro	Portugal	58.22	Q
12	2	Maena Drouin	France	58.42	q
13	3	Anna Mager	Austria	58.54	Q
14	4	Mariya Buryak	Ukraine	58.60	Q
15	3	Janka Molnár	Hungary	58.61	q
16	4	Nina Hespel	Belgium	58.66	Q
17	4	Regina Mohai	Hungary	58.74	Q
18	2	Romy Dannenburg	Netherlands	58.92	Q
19	3	Marin Stray Gautadottir	Norway	58.98	Q
20	1	Giorgia Marcomin	Italy	59.09	Q
21	1	Martha Rasmussen	Denmark	59.12	Q
22	3	Vasiliki-Paraskevi Mitsiouli	Greece	59.34	Q
23	1	Ebba Åhman	Sweden	59.59	Q
24	5	Sofia Lavreshina	Portugal	59.75	Q
25	4	Lena Wernli	Switzerland	59.75	Q
26	2	Sofia Faggion	Italy	59.85	Q
27	2	Rahela Leščak	Croatia	1:00.06	Q
28	3	Debby Schenk	Switzerland	1:00.10	Q
29	5	Natalija Švenda	Croatia	1:00.22	Q
30	2	Yaroslava Yalysovetska	Ukraine	1:00.37	Q
31	5	Anja Dlauhy	Austria	1:00.46	Q
32	1	Laura Dobránszky	Hungary	1:00.59	Q
33	2	Mia Pirnat Kopač	Slovenia	1:01.17	Q
34	4	Zuzana Cymbálová	Czech Republic	1:01.23	Q
35	4	Tyra Landin	Sweden	1:01.24	Q
36	4	Elimpiona Zenegia	Greece	1:01.27	Q
37	4	Iida Verainen	Finland	1:01.84	Q
38	3	Andrea Švecová	Slovakia	1:02.71	Q
39	1	Laoura Zenegia	Greece	1:03.24	Q
40	3	Dragana Macanović	Serbia	1:07.66	Q

=== Semifinals ===
Qualification rule: First 3 in each heat (Q) and the next 2 fastest (q) advance to the Final.

Rank	Heat	Name	Nationality	Time	Notes
1	1	Lena Preßler	Austria	56.48	Q
2	1	Nina Hespel	Belgium	56.57	Q
3	1	Andrea Rooth	Norway	56.93	Q
4	2	Louise Maraval	France	56.95	Q
5	2	Carla García	Spain	57.19	Q
6	2	Janka Molnár	Hungary	57.27	Q
7	2	Aada Aho	Finland	57.46	q, PB
8	1	Mariya Buryak	Ukraine	57.57	q, PB
9	2	Ester Bendová	Czech Republic	57.82	
10	1	Maena Drouin	France	58.21	
11	1	Heidi Salminen	Finland	58.58	
12	1	Juliana Guerreiro	Portugal	58.85	
13	2	Hanna Karlsson	Sweden	58.86	
14	2	Alessia Seramondi	Italy	59.02	
15	1	Salome Hüsler	Switzerland	59.15	
16	2	Anna Mager	Austria	1:06.10	

=== Final ===
Rank	Lane	Name	Nationality	Time	Notes
1st place, gold medalist(s)	3	Andrea Rooth	Norway	55.78	EU23L
2nd place, silver medalist(s)	6	Louise Maraval	France	55.83	PB
3rd place, bronze medalist(s)	5	Lena Preßler	Austria	55.94	NR
4	8	Janka Molnár	Hungary	56.16	
5	7	Nina Hespel	Belgium	56.25	
6	2	Mariya Buryak	Ukraine	56.92	PB
7	4	Carla García	Spain	56.94	SB
8	1	Aada Aho	Finland	58.14	
