= Alexe Déau =

French athlete (born 2004)

Alexe Deau
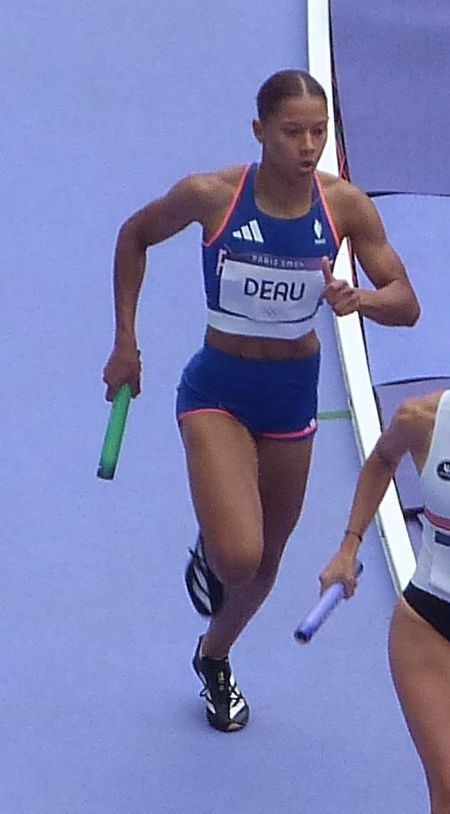
- Deau at the 2024 Olympic Games

Personal information
- Nationality: French
- Born: 4 September 2004 (age 22) La Trinité, Martinique
- Height: 170 cm (5 ft 7 in)
- Weight: 59 kg (130 lb)

Sport
- Country: France
- Sport: Athletics
- Event: Sprint

Achievements and titles
- Personal bests: 400 m: 50.94 s (Bergen, 2025)
Medal record
Women's athletics
Representing France
European U23 Championships
Bronze medal – third place	2025 Bergen	400m
Bronze medal – third place	2025 Bergen	4x400 m relay
European U20 Championships
Silver medal – second place	2023 Jerusalem	400m
Gold medal – first place	2023 Jerusalem	4x400m relay

Alexe Déau (born 4 September 2004) is a French sprinter. She competed at the 2024 Summer Olympics.

== Early life ==
She is from Sainte-Marie, on the island of Martinique. Déau started athletics in 2011 with Gauloise de Trinité. She then joined the RAN (Regroupement Athlétique du Nord) before leaving for mainland France.

== Career ==
After moving to mainland France, she joined the ASA Athletics club in Maisons-Alfort. She was a silver medalist in the 400 metres at the 2023 European Athletics U20 Championships in Jerusalem, Israel, finishing six tenths of a second behind Czech runner Lurdes Gloria Manuel. Déau ran a personal best time of 52.53 seconds which moved her to number two on the all-time France under-20 list, just one hundredth of a second behind the French U20 record which was set in 1982. She also went on to win the gold medal in the women's 4 x 400 metres relay at the same championships.

She ran at the 2024 European Athletics Championships in Rome, Italy, as part of the France women's 4 × 400 metres relay team. The team subsequently placed fifth in the final in June 2024. Later that month, she finished second behind Amandine Brossier over 400 metres at the French Athletics Championships, running a personal best time of 52.35 seconds in Angers.

She was selected for the French relay pool for the 2024 Olympic Games in Paris. She ran as part of the French women's 4x400 metres relay team which qualified for the final.

She competed at the 2025 World Athletics Relays in China in the Women's 4 × 400 metres relay in May 2025. She also competed in the Mixed 4 × 400 metres relay at the event. She ran a 50.94 seconds personal best to win the bronze medal in the 400 metres at the 2025 European Athletics U23 Championships in Bergen, Norway. Later in the championships, she ran the anchor leg as part of the bronze medal winning French 4 x 400 metres relay team. She was selected for the French team for the 2025 World Athletics Championships in Tokyo, Japan. She ran on the opening day in the mixed 4 × 400 metres relay. She also ran in the French women's x 400 metres relay team which qualified for the final.
