= 2025 European Athletics U23 Championships – Women's 400 metres =

Women's 400 metres at the 2025 European Athletics U23 Championships
- Venue: Fana Stadion
- Location: Bergen, Norway
- Dates: 17 July (heats); 18 July (semi-finals); 19 July (final)
- Competitors: 28 from 19 nations
- Winning time: 49.74 CR

Medalists
gold medal	Henriette Jæger	Norway
silver medal	Yemi Mary John	Great Britain
bronze medal	Alexe Deau	France

The women's 400 metres event at the 2025 European Athletics U23 Championships was held in Bergen, Norway, at Fana Stadion on 17, 18 and 19 July.

== Records ==
Prior to the competition, the records were as follows:

Record	Athlete (nation)	Time (s)	Location	Date
European U23 record	Marita Koch (GDR)	48.60	Turin, Italy	4 August 1979
Championship U23 record	Olga Zaytseva (RUS)	50.72	Erfurt, Germany	16 July 2005

== Results ==
=== Heats ===
First 3 in each heat (Q) and the next 4 fastest (q) qualified for the semi-finals.

==== Heat 1 ====
Place	Athlete	Nation	Time	Notes
1	Henriette Jæger	Norway	52.19	Q
2	Ana Prieto	Spain	52.64	Q
3	Elna Wester	Sweden	52.95	Q
4	Clarissa Vianelli	Italy	53.10	q, PB
5	Nataliia Besidovska	Ukraine	54.81	
6	Ajda KaučIč	Slovenia	55.01	
7	Helene Vogel	Austria	55.14	

==== Heat 2 ====
Place	Athlete	Nation	Time	Notes
1	Rebecca Grieve	Great Britain	52.30	Q
2	Myrte van der Schoot	Netherlands	52.97	Q
3	Klaudia Osipiuk	Poland	53.36	Q, =PB
4	Berta Segura	Spain	53.79	q
5	Nancy Dematte'	Italy	53.84	q
6	Ema Sarafinaitė	Lithuania	54.73	
7	Cecilie Gedsö Färge	Denmark	55.66	PB

==== Heat 3 ====
Place	Athlete	Nation	Time	Notes
1	Alexe Déau	France	52.26	Q
2	Poppy Malik	Great Britain	52.84	Q
3	Karolina Zbičajnik	Slovenia	53.66	Q
4	Ioana Andrei	Romania	54.34	
5	Zoe Tessarolo	Italy	54.51	
6	Ani Mamatsashvili	Georgia	55.16	
7	Hege-Lee Pielberg	Estonia	55.60	

==== Heat 4 ====
Place	Athlete	Nation	Time	Notes
1	Yemi Mary John	Great Britain	52.39	Q
2	Anouk Krause-Jentsch	Germany	53.45	Q
3	Dominika Duraj	Poland	53.47	Q, SB
4	Lou-Anne Pouzancre-Hoyer	France	53.51	q
5	Laura van der Veen	Norway	53.91	
6	Kaya Simasotchi	Switzerland	54.66	
7	Nicole Milić	Croatia	55.50	

=== Semi-finals ===
First 3 in each heat (Q) and the next 2 fastest (q) qualified for the final.

==== Heat 1 ====
Place	Athlete	Nation	Time	Notes
1	Yemi Mary John	Great Britain	51.64	Q
2	Henriette Jæger	Norway	51.69	Q
3	Ana Prieto	Spain	52.11	Q, PB
4	Elna Wester	Sweden	52.50	q
5	Anouk Krause-Jentsch	Germany	52.98	PB
6	Dominika Duraj	Poland	53.53	
7	Clarissa Vianelli	Italy	53.68	
8	Lou-Anne Pouzancre-Hoyer	France	53.97	

==== Heat 2 ====
Place	Athlete	Nation	Time	Notes
1	Alexe Déau	France	51.67	Q, PB
2	Myrte van der Schoot	Netherlands	52.00 [.997]	Q, PB
3	Poppy Malik	Great Britain	52.00 [.999]	Q
4	Rebecca Grieve	Great Britain	52.56	q
5	Klaudia Osipiuk	Poland	53.31	PB
6	Karolina Zbičajnik	Slovenia	53.58	
7	Berta Segura	Spain	54.16	
8	Nancy Dematte'	Italy	54.39	

=== Final ===
Place	Athlete	Nation	Time	Notes
1st place, gold medalist(s)	Henriette Jæger	Norway	49.74	CR
2nd place, silver medalist(s)	Yemi Mary John	Great Britain	50.50	PB
3rd place, bronze medalist(s)	Alexe Déau	France	50.94	PB
4	Ana Prieto	Spain	51.75	PB
5	Poppy Malik	Great Britain	52.03	
6	Myrte van der Schoot	Netherlands	52.21	
7	Elna Wester	Sweden	52.33	
8	Rebecca Grieve	Great Britain	52.59	
