= Daniela García (athlete) =

Spanish middle-distance runner

Personal information
- Full name: Daniela García Tena
- Nationality: Spanish
- Born: 31 August 2001 (age 24)

Sport
- Sport: Athletics
- Event: 800 metres
Medal record
World University Games
Bronze medal – third place	2025 Bochum	800 m

Daniela García Tena (born 31 August 2001) is a Spanish athlete. She competed in the women's 800 metres event at the 2021 European Athletics Indoor Championships.

== International competitions ==
Year	Competition	Venue	Position	Event	Time
Representing Spain
2019	European U20 Championships	Borås, Sweden	6th	800 m	2:05.43
2021	European Indoor Championships	Toruń, Poland	12th (sf)	800 m i	2:04.32
2021	European U23 Championships	Tallinn, Estonia	5th	800 m	2:04.13
2022	Mediterranean Games	Oran, Algeria	5th	800 m	2:03.45)
2022	Ibero-American Championships	La Nucía, Spain	2nd	800 m	2:03.65
2022	Mediterranean U23 Championships	Pescara, Italy	5th	800 m	2:09.84
2022	Mediterranean U23 Championships	Pescara, Italy	2nd	4 x 400 m	3:43.21
2023	European Indoor Championships	Istanbul, Turkey	12th (h)	800 m i	2:04.20
2023	European U23 Championships	Espoo, Finland	1st	800 m	2:02.96
2023	World Championships	Budapest, Hungary	31st (h)	800 m	2:00.92
2024	European Championships	Rome, Italy	11th (sf)	800 m	2:00.68
2025	European Indoor Championships	Apeldoorn, Netherlands	4th (sf)	800 m i	2:02.16
