= Yemi Mary John =

British athlete (born 2003)

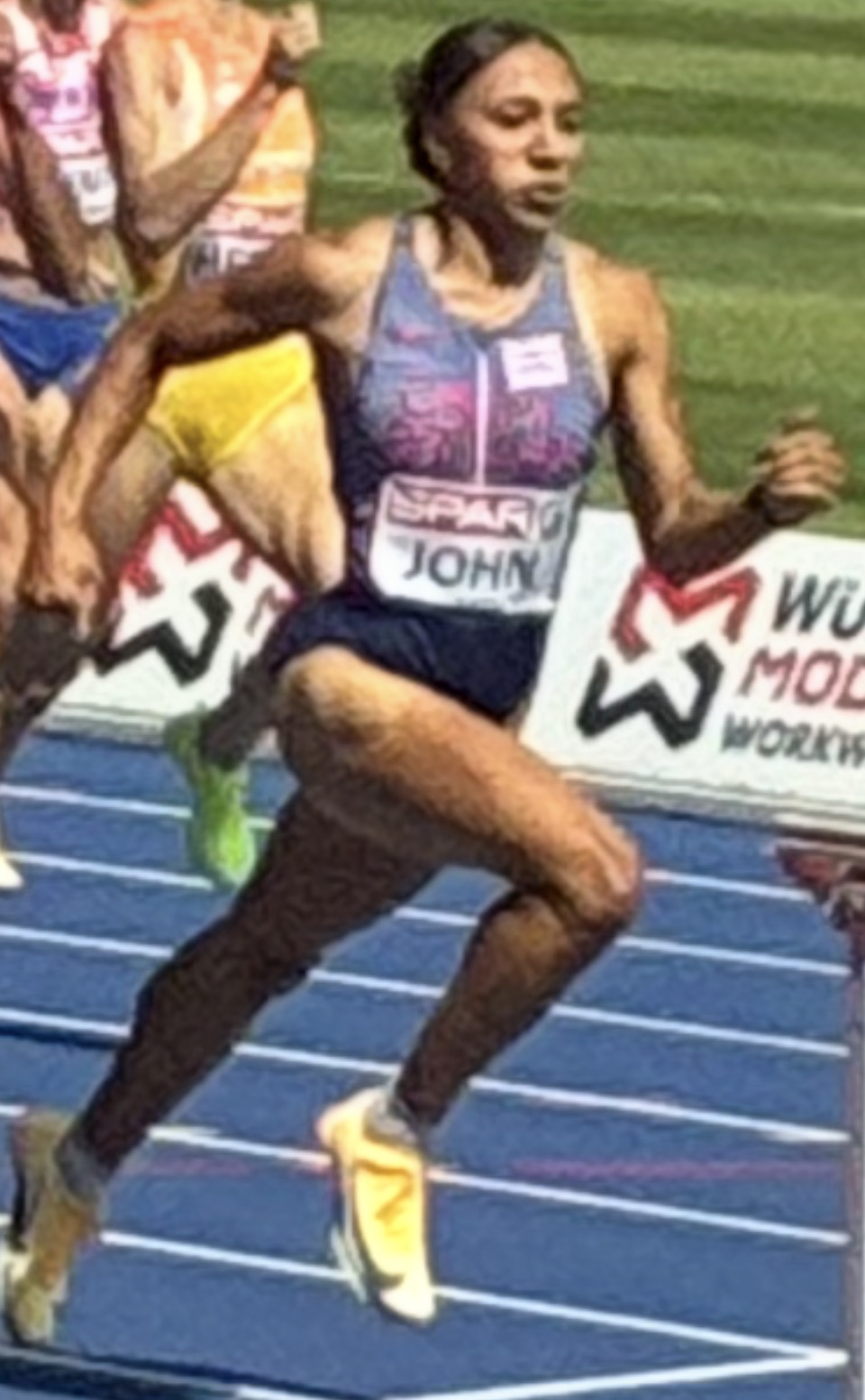
- John in 2026

Personal information
- Nationality: British
- Born: 3 May 2003 (age 23) Italy

Sport
- Sport: Track and field
- Event: 400 metres
- College team: USC Trojans
- Club: Woodford Green with Essex Ladies

Achievements and titles
- Personal bests: 400 m: 49.85 s (Tokyo, 2026); Indoor; 400 m: 51.55 s (Metz, 2026)
Medal record
Women's athletics
Representing Great Britain
Olympic Games
Bronze medal – third place	2024 Paris	4 × 400 m relay
World Championships
Silver medal – second place	2023 Budapest	4 × 400 m mixed
Bronze medal – third place	2023 Budapest	4 × 400 m relay
World Ultimate Championship
Second place	2026 Budapest	Mixed 4 × 400 m relay
European Championships
Silver medal – second place	2026 Birmingham	4 × 400 m relay
Silver medal – second place	2026 Birmingham	4 × 400 m mixed
World Relays
Bronze medal – third place	2026 Gaborone	4 × 400 m mixed
European U23 Championships
Gold medal – first place	2023 Espoo	400 m
Gold medal – first place	2025 Bergen	4 × 400 m relay
Silver medal – second place	2025 Bergen	400 m
World U20 Championships
Gold medal – first place	2022 Cali	400 m
Bronze medal – third place	2022 Cali	4 × 400 m relay
European U20 Championships
Silver medal – second place	2021 Tallinn	400 m
Representing England
Commonwealth Games
Silver medal – second place	2026 Glasgow	4 × 400 m Mixed

Yemi Mary John (born 3 May 2003) is a British track and field athlete. She won the gold medal in the 400 metres at the 2022 World Athletics Under-20 Championships and the 2026 British Indoor Athletics Championships. She was a medalist in the 4 × 400 metres relay at the 2024 Olympic Games, and 2023 World Athletics Championships.

== Biography ==
John ran a new personal best to finish runner up in the 400 metres at the 2021 European Under-20 Championships in Tallinn. She was a member of the British 4 × 400 m relay team that finished fifth at the 2022 World Indoor Championships held in Belgrade.

Yemi was crowned the winner at the 2022 World U20 Championship 400 m event in Cali, Colombia as she lowered her personal best throughout the rounds to win the final in 51.50 seconds, the second fastest time ever recorded by a British under-20 athlete, after Linsey MacDonald's 51.16 s from 1980. She later also won bronze in the 4 × 400 m relay race at the event.

Competing at the British Athletics Championships in July 2023, in Manchester, England, she reached the final of the women's 400 m and finished in 3rd place. She was selected as part of the Great Britain team for the 2023 European Athletics U23 Championships held from in July 2023 in Espoo, Finland. Yemi Mary John won a gold medal in the 400 m at the event, with compatriot Keely Hodgkinson in third.

She was chosen to represent Great Britain at the 2023 World Athletics Championships in Budapest in August 2023. Running the anchor leg in the mixed 4 × 400-metre relay, she took advantage of a late, dramatic fall by Femke Bol of the Netherlands to win world silver, her first senior representative medal. A week later, she ran in the heats of the women's 4 × 400 metres relay, winning a bronze medal.

After winning the 400 metres bronze medal at the 2024 British Athletics Championships, John was subsequently named in the Great Britain team for the 2024 Summer Olympics. Again running the heats only, she won an Olympic bronze medal as part of the successful Great Britain women's 4 × 400 metres relay squad.

She lowered her personal best to 50.50 seconds winning the silver medal in the 400 metres for the British team for the 2025 European Athletics U23 Championships in Bergen. Later in the championships, she ran as part of the gold medal-winning British 4 × 400 metres relay team.

On 2 August, she won her heat to qualify for the final of the 400 metres at the 2025 UK Athletics Championships in Birmingham. She was selected as part of the British team for the 2025 World Athletics Championships in Tokyo, Japan. She ran in the women's 4 × 400 metres relay, being eliminated in the heats.

On 8 February 2026, John ran an indoor personal best for the 400 metres of 51.55 seconds in Metz, France. John won the 400 metres at the 2026 British Indoor Athletics Championships in Birmingham on 15 February 2026, finishing ahead of Louisa Stoney and 2025 World Indoor Champion Amber Anning. Competing in the individual 400 metres at the 2026 World Athletics Indoor Championships in Poland, she ran 52.28 seconds without advancing from her heat.

John was named in the British squad for the 4 × 400 metres relay at the 2026 World Athletics Relays in Gaborone, Botswana. On the opening day of the competition, she anchored the British mixed 4 × 400 m team and ran a split time of 49.15 seconds as they qualified for the final with the fastest overall time of 3:09.69. The following day, she again ran the anchor leg to secure the bronze medal for the British team. On 17 May 2026, John broke ground to a major personal best of 49.85 s at the Golden Grand Prix in Tokyo, becoming the seventh and youngest British woman to break the 50-second barrier for the 400 m. Later that month, she competed in Poland and ran 50.36 seconds for second place in the 400 m behind home runner Natalia Bukowiecka at the Irena Szewińska Memorial. On 21 June, she finished runner-up to Amber Anning in the final of the 400 metres at the 2026 UK Athletics Championships, running 50.23 seconds.

John was selected to represent England at the 2026 Commonwealth Games in Glasgow, placing sixth in the final of the 400 metres. She later won a silver medal in the mixed 4 × 400 m relay. On 10 August, she won a silver medal competing for Great Britain at the 2026 European Athletics Championships in the mixed 4 × 400 metres relay in Birmingham. Competing individually, she placed fifth in the final of the women's 400 metres. On the final night of the championships, she won the silver medal in the women's 4 × 400 metres relay. In September, selected as part of the Great Britain team to compete at the inaugural World Athletics Ultimate Championship in Budapest, she ran in the mixed 4 × 400 metres relay, as the team placed second overall.

== Personal life ==
Yemi has a Nigerian father (Christopher Olanrewaju John) and an Italian mother (Gabriella Faciotti) who lives in London. She was set to join the University of Michigan as a freshman in 2023, but signed for the University of Southern California.
