= Carmen Avilés =

Spanish athlete (born 2002)

Personal information
- Full name: Carmen Avilés Palos
- Nationality: Spanish
- Born: 5 April 2002 (age 24) Madrid, Spain
- Height: 1.76 m (5 ft 9 in)

Sport
- Sport: Athletics
- Event: 400 metres

Achievements and titles
- Personal best(s): 400 m:: 51.82 (Madrid, 2025)
Medal record
Women's athletics
Representing Spain
World Indoor Championships
Bronze medal – third place	2026 Toruń	4 × 400 m relay
European U23 Championships
Bronze medal – third place	2023 Espoo	4 × 400 m relay
European U20 Championships
Silver medal – second place	2021 Tallinn	4 × 400 m relay

Carmen Avilés Palos (Note: In this Spanish name, the first or paternal surname is Avilés and the second or maternal family name is Palos.) (born 5 April 2002) is a Spanish sprinter. She has competed for Spain at multiple major championships, including the 2024 Olympic Games. That year, she was part of a Spanish team which set a new national record in the women's 4 x 400 metres relay.

== Biography ==
In July 2021, she was part of the Spanish 4 × 400 m relay team that won silver at the 2021 European Athletics U20 Championships in Tallinn.

In March 2022, she ran as part of the Spanish 4 × 400 m relay team at the World Athletics Indoor Championships in Belgrade. In May 2022, she won gold in a Spanish U23 record time in the 4 × 400 m relay at the 2022 Ibero-American Championships in Athletics. She competed at the 2022 World Athletics Championships in the 4 × 400 m relay in Eugene.

In July 2023, she was part of the Spanish 4 × 400 m relay team which won bronze at the 2023 European Athletics U23 Championships in Espoo.

Avilés was part of the Spanish 4 × 400 m relay team that qualified for the 2024 Paris Olympics at the 2024 World Relays in Nassau.

Avilés was selected for the 2024 European Athletics Championships in Rome in June 2024. Her Spanish 4 × 400 m relay team qualified for the final and placed seventh overall. The team of Avilés, Berta Segura, Blanca Hervás and Eva Santidrián set a new Spanish national record time 3:25.25, more than two seconds lower than the previous national best.

Avilés ran a personal best time for the 400 metres of 52.16 seconds in Madrid on 21 June 2024. On 29 June 2024, she came third at the Spanish championships over 400 metres in La Nucia. She competed in the women's 4 × 400 metres relay at the 2024 Paris Olympics.

She competed at the 2025 World Athletics Relays in China in the Mixed 4 × 400 metres relay in May 2025. She was subsequently selected for the Spanish team for the 2025 World Athletics Championships in Tokyo, Japan, where she ran in the women's x 400 metres relay.

In March 2026, she was selected for the Spanish relay team for the 2026 World Athletics Indoor Championships in Poland, winning a bronze medal with the women’s 4 x 400 metres relay team. In May, she ran at the 2026 World Athletics Relays in the mixed 4 × 400 metres relay in Gaborone, Botswana.

== Personal life ==
Avilés is from Córdoba.
