= Louise Maraval =

French athlete (born 2001)

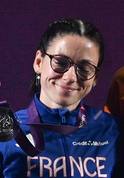
- Maraval with her silver European 400 m hurdles medal

Personal information
- Born: 31 July 2001 (age 25) Cholet, France
- Home town: La Verrie, France
- Height: 167 cm (5 ft 6 in)
- Weight: 61 kg (134 lb)

Sport
- Country: France
- Sport: Athletics
- Event: 400 m hurdles

Achievements and titles
- Personal bests: 400 mH: 53.71 (Angers, 2024)
Medal record
Women's athletics
Representing France
European Championships
Silver medal – second place	2024 Rome	400 m hurdles
European U23 Championships
Gold medal – first place	2023 Espoo	4 × 400 m relay
Silver medal – second place	2021 Tallinn	4 × 400 m relay
Silver medal – second place	2023 Espoo	400 m hurdles
Mediterranean Games
Silver medal – second place	2026 Taranto	400 m hurdles

Louise Maraval (French pronunciation: [lwiz maʁaval]; born 31 July 2001) is a French hurdler and sprinter. In 2023, she became the French national champion over 400 metres hurdles. In 2024, she won the silver medal at the European Championships.

== Biography ==
Maraval runs for Entente Sèvre in Saint-Laurent-sur-Sèvre in the Vendée department of the Pays de la Loire region.

She was a silver medalist in the 4 × 400 m relay at the 2021 European Athletics U23 Championships in Tallinn.

In February 2023, she was runner-up in the 400 metres at the French indoor championships in Aubiere. She was a silver medalist in the 400 metres hurdles at the 2023 European Athletics U23 Championships in Espoo. At the championships she also won gold anchoring the French team in the women's 4 × 400 m relay. She won the French national title in the 400 m hurdles in July 2023 in Albi.

She competed for France at the 2023 World Athletics Championships in Budapest as part of the French mixed 4 × 400 m relay which set a new national record in 3:12:25 and finished in fourth place in the final.

She ran as part of the French Mixed 4 × 400 m relay team which qualified for the 2024 Paris Olympics at the 2024 World Relays Championships in Nassau, Bahamas.

In May 2024, Maraval moved to second in the all-time French list for the 400 m hurdles, behind Marie-José Pérec, by running 54.44 in Marseille. In doing so she also achieved the qualifying standard for the 2024 Paris Olympics. On 10 June 2024, she ran a personal best 54.36 to qualify for the final at the 2024 European Athletics Championships in Rome. In the final she came away with the silver medal behind Femke Bol, and lowered her personal best to 54.23 seconds.

On 30 June 2024, she won the French national 400 m hurdles title in Angers in a time of 53.71 seconds. She competed in the 400 metres hurdles at the 2024 Summer Olympics in Paris in August 2024, placing eighth in the final. She also competed in the women's 4 × 400 m relay and mixed 4 × 400 m relay at the Games.

She was selected for the 2025 European Athletics Indoor Championships in Appeldoorn. On 10 April 2025, she was named in the French team for the 2025 World Athletics Relays in Guangzhou, China in May 2025. She competed in the women's 4 × 400 metres relay as the French team finished second behind the United States in their heat to secure a place at the 2025 World Championships. On the second day, she also competed in the Mixed 4 × 400 metres relay at the event helping that French team also qualify for the World Championships.

She was selected for the French team for the 2025 World Athletics Championships in Tokyo, Japan running 55.83 seconds without qualifying for the semi-finals.

In May 2026, she ran at the 2026 World Athletics Relays in the mixed 4 × 400 metres relay. She also ran in the women's 4 × 400 metres relay at the championships in Gaborone, Botswana. In June, she was runner-up to Emily Newnham over 400 metres hurdles at the Josef Odložil Memorial in Prague. Competing at the 2026 European Athletics Championships in Birmingham, England, she was a finalist in the 400 metres hurdles, placing eighth. She also competed in the women's 4 × 400 metres relay at the championships. In September, she competed in the 400 m hurdles at the inaugural World Ultimate Championship in Budapest.

== International competitions ==
Year	Competition	Venue	Position	Event	Notes
Competing for France
2019	European U20 Championships	Borås, Sweden	14th	Heptathlon	5239 pts
2021	European U23 Championships	Tallinn, Estonia	8th	Heptathlon	5725 pts
2021	European U23 Championships	Tallinn, Estonia	2nd	4 × 400 m relay	3:30.33
2023	European U23 Championships	Espoo, Finland	2nd	400 m hurdles	55.83
2023	European U23 Championships	Espoo, Finland	1st	4 × 400 m relay	3:30.60
2023	World Championships	Budapest, Hungary	4th	Mixed 4 × 400 m relay	3:12.99
2023	World Championships	Budapest, Hungary	9th	4 × 400 m relay	3:28.35
2024	World Relays	Nassau, Bahamas	6th	Mixed 4 × 400 m relay	3:17.38
2024	European Championships	Rome, Italy	−	Mixed 4 × 400 m relay	DQ
2024	European Championships	Rome, Italy	2nd	400 m hurdles	54.23
2024	European Championships	Rome, Italy	5th	4 × 400 m relay	3:22.39
2024	Olympic Games	Paris, France	−	Mixed 4 × 400 m relay	DQ
2024	Olympic Games	Paris, France	8th	400 m hurdles	54.53
2024	Olympic Games	Paris, France	5th	4 × 400 m relay	3:21.41
2025	European Indoor Championships	Apeldoorn, Netherlands	5th	4 × 400 m relay	3:25.80
2025	World Championships	Tokyo, Japan	30th (h)	400 m hurdles	55.84
2025	World Championships	Tokyo, Japan	7th	4 × 400 m relay	3:24.08
2026	European Championships	Birmingham, United Kingdom	8th	400 m hurdles	54.88
2026	European Championships	Birmingham, United Kingdom	5th	4 × 400 m relay	3:24.50
2026	Mediterranean Games	Taranto, Italy	2nd	400 m hurdles	54.68
2026	World Ultimate Championship	Budapest, Hungary	15th (h)	400 m hurdles	55.97
