= 2023 European Athletics Indoor Championships – Women's 800 metres =

Women's 800 metres at the 2023 European Athletics Indoor Championships
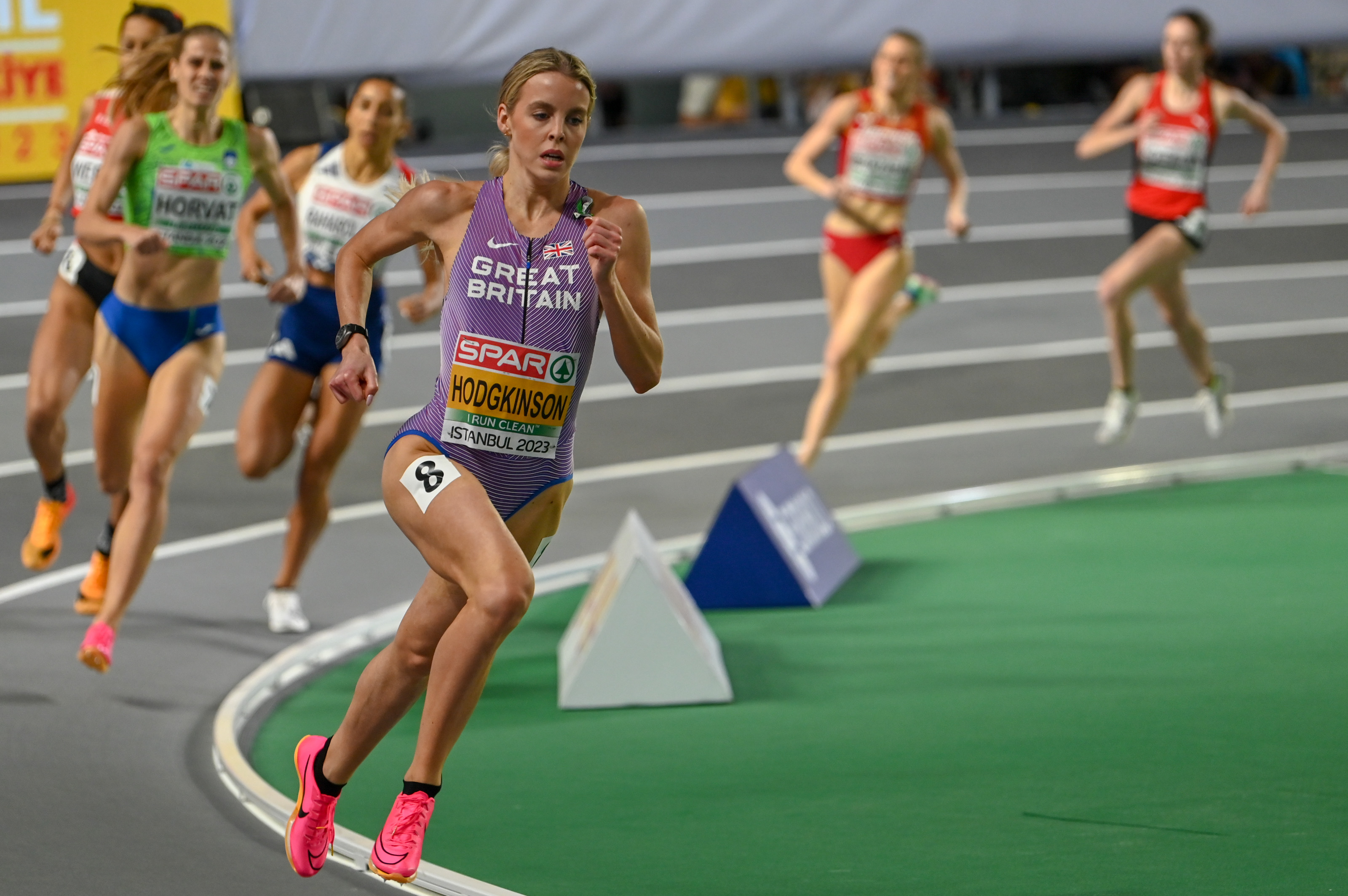
- The final underway.
- Venue: Ataköy Athletics Arena
- Location: Istanbul, Turkey
- Dates: 2 March 2023 (round 1); 4 March 2023 (semi-finals); 5 March 2025 (final)
- Competitors: 28 from 16 nations
- Winning time: 1:58.66

Medalists
gold medal	Keely Hodgkinson	Great Britain
silver medal	Anita Horvat	Slovenia
bronze medal	Agnès Raharolahy	France

The women's 800 metres event at the 2023 European Athletics Indoor Championships was held on 2 March 2023 at 19:40 (heats), on 4 March at 19:15 (semi-finals), and on 5 March at 20:35 (final) local time.

== Records ==
Standing records prior to the 2023 European Athletics Indoor Championships
World record	Jolanda Čeplak (SLO)	1:55.82	Wien, Austria	3 March 2002
European record	Jolanda Čeplak (SLO)	1:55.82	Wien, Austria	3 March 2002
Championship record	Jolanda Čeplak (SLO)	1:55.82	Wien, Austria	3 March 2002
World Leading	Keely Hodgkinson (GBR)	1:57.18	Birmingham, Great Britain	25 February 2023
European Leading	Keely Hodgkinson (GBR)	1:57.18	Birmingham, Great Britain	25 February 2023

== Results ==
=== Heats ===
Qualification: First 2 in each heat (Q) and the next 2 fastest (q) advance to the Semifinals.

Rank	Heat	Athlete	Nationality	Time	Note
1	3	Keely Hodgkinson	Great Britain	2:01.67	Q
2	3	Majtie Kolberg	Germany	2:01.94	Q, PB
3	3	Eloisa Coiro	Italy	2:02.19	q
4	2	Anita Horvat	Slovenia	2:03.06	Q
5	1	Isabelle Boffey	Great Britain	2:03.24	Q
6	2	Gabriela Gajanová	Slovakia	2:03.25	Q
7	1	Bianka Kéri	Hungary	2:03.26	Q
8	2	Lore Hoffmann	Switzerland	2:03.34	q
9	3	Hedda Hynne	Norway	2:03.34	SB
10	1	Annemarie Nissen	Denmark	2:03.70	PB
11	3	Valentina Rosamilia	Switzerland	2:04.14	
12	2	Daniela García	Spain	2:04.20	
13	5	Agnès Raharolahy	France	2:04.56	Q
14	5	Lorea Ibarzabal	Spain	2:04.63	Q
15	1	Charlotte Pizzo	France	2:04.89	
16	5	Elena Bellò	Italy	2:05.06	
17	5	Veronika Sadek	Slovenia	2:05.32	
18	5	Angelika Sarna	Poland	2:05.50	
19	4	Audrey Werro	Switzerland	2:05.60	Q
20	4	Léna Kandissounon	France	2:05.80	Q
21	4	Margarita Koczanowa	Poland	2:06.00	
22	5	Julia Nielsen	Sweden	2:06.33	
23	4	Wilma Nielsen	Sweden	2:06.79	
24	1	Jerneja Smonkar	Slovenia	2:06.94	
25	4	Patrícia Silva	Portugal	2:07.58	
26	4	Tuğba Toptaş	Turkey	2:08.14	
27	2	Cristina Daniela Balan	Romania	2:08.92	
28	2	Malin Ingeborg Nyfors	Norway	2:14.93	

=== Semifinals ===
Qualification: First 3 in each heat (Q) and the next 2 fastest (q) advance to the Final.

Rank	Heat	Athlete	Nationality	Time	Note
1	1	Keely Hodgkinson	Great Britain	2:00.05	Q
2	1	Audrey Werro	Switzerland	2:01.19	Q
3	1	Lorea Ibarzabal	Spain	2:01.25	Q
4	1	Agnès Raharolahy	France	2:01.31	q
5	1	Majtie Kolberg	Germany	2:01.49	q, PB
6	1	Gabriela Gajanová	Slovakia	2:01.70	NR
7	2	Anita Horvat	Slovenia	2:03.11	Q
8	2	Lore Hoffmann	Switzerland	2:03.19	Q
9	2	Eloisa Coiro	Italy	2:03.31	Q
10	2	Bianka Kéri	Hungary	2:03.36	
11	2	Léna Kandissounon	France	2:03.58	
12	2	Isabelle Boffey	Great Britain	2:03.94	

=== Final ===
Rank	Lane	Athlete	Nationality	Time	Note
1st place, gold medalist(s)	6	Keely Hodgkinson	Great Britain	1:58.66	
2nd place, silver medalist(s)	5	Anita Horvat	Slovenia	2:00.54	
3rd place, bronze medalist(s)	1	Agnès Raharolahy	France	2:00.85	
4	3	Lorea Ibarzabal	Spain	2:00.87	PB
5	4	Audrey Werro	Switzerland	2:00.91	
6	3	Lore Hoffmann	Switzerland	2:01.22	PB
7	2	Eloisa Coiro	Italy	2:02.80	
8	2	Majtie Kolberg	Germany	2:03.65	
