= Lena Pressler =

Austrian athlete (born 2001)

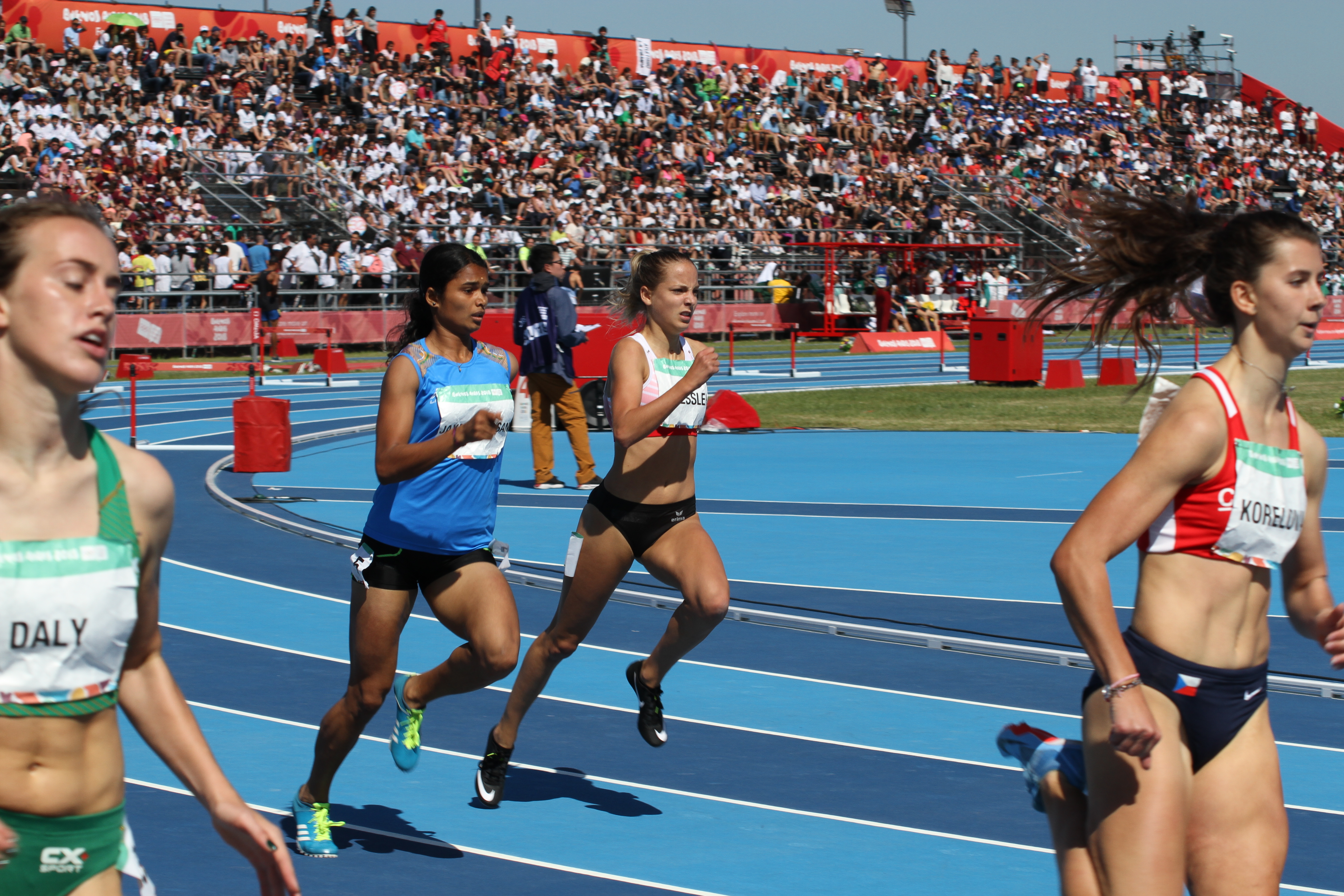
- Pressler in 2018

Personal information
- Nationality: Austrian
- Born: 15 January 2001 (age 25)

Sport
- Sport: Athletics
- Event: Sprint
Medal record
Women's athletics
Representing Austria
European U23 Championships
Bronze medal – third place	2023 Espoo	400 m hurdles
European U18 Championships
Bronze medal – third place	2018 Győr	400m hurdles

Lena Pressler (born 15 January 2001) is an Austrian hurdler. She is a multiple-time national champion and Balkan champion in the 400 metres hurdles.

== Biography ==
A member of Union St. Pölten, Pressler won a bronze medal representing Austria in Győr at the 2018 European Athletics U18 Championships, in the women's 400 metres hurdles.

In 2022, Pressler broke the long-standing Austrian national record in the 400m hurdles with a time of 56.73 seconds. In June 2023, she sat another new Austrian record. with a time of 56.15 seconds. Pressler won a bronze medal representing Austria at the 2023 European Athletics U23 Championships in Espoo, Finland, in the women's 400 metres hurdles. Pressler won the Balkan Championships over 400 metres hurdles in 2024.

In May 2026, she was part of the Austrian women's 4 x 400 metres relay team which ran 3:32.71 to break the oldest existing Austrian national record previously from 1976. The following month, Pressler won the 2026 Balkan Championships over 400 metres hurdles in a time of 55.36 seconds. Pressler represented Austria at the 2026 European Athletics Championships in Birmingham in the 400 metres hurdles, reaching the semi-finals with the fastest time from the preliminary heats of 54.97 seconds.
