= Veera Mattila =

Finnish athlete (born 2003)

Personal information
- Nationality: Finnish
- Born: 21 January 2003 (age 23)

Sport
- Sport: Athletics
- Event: 800m

Achievements and titles
- Personal bests: 800m: 2:01.12 (Tampere, 2023)
Medal record
Women's athletics
Representing Finland
European U23 Championships
Silver medal – second place	2023 Espoo	800m

Veera Mattila (born 21 January 2003) is a track and field athlete from Finland. In 2023, she was a silver medalist at the 2023 European Athletics U23 Championships and became the national indoor champion over 800 metres, and in 2024 national indoor champion over 400 metres. In 2025, she won the 800m at the Finnish Athletics Championships and in 2026, again won the 800m indoors.

== Early life ==
From Kiikoinen, she attended High School in Pori. She then studied biology at the University of Turku.

== Career ==
She was part of a Finnish 4 × 400 m relay team that set a new national U20 record at the 2022 World Athletics U20 Championships in Cali, Colombia. Individually at that championships she competed in the 800 metres and qualified from the heats for the semi-finals. In August 2022, she was selected for the Finnish team at the 2022 European Athletics Championships held in Munich, Germany.

In February 2023, she became the Finnish national indoor champion over 800m, in Helsinki. She ran a new indoor personal best time of 2:08.01. At the same competition she also ran in the 400m and set a new indoor personal best of 54.85, finishing fifth.

In July 2023, she competed in the 2023 European Athletics U23 Championships – Women's 800 metres and won the silver medal in Espoo, Finland, in a new personal best time of 2:03.14. Although, she was initially mistakenly given the bronze medal on the podium. She ran a personal best for the 800 metres of 2:01.12 in Tampere, Finland on 8 August 2023.

She won the national title over 400 metre at the 2024 Finnish Indoor Athletics Championships in a time of 55.54 seconds. She was runner-up to Sara Lappalainen at the Finnish Athletics Championships over 800 metres in June 2024.

In August 2025, she won the 800 metres at the Finish Championships in Espoo. She won the 800 metres on 1 March 2026 at the Finnish Indoor Championships.

In August 2026, she competed for Finland at the 2026 European Athletics Championships in Birmingham, England, in the women's 4 x 400 metres relay.
