= Andrea Rooth =

Norwegian athletics competitor

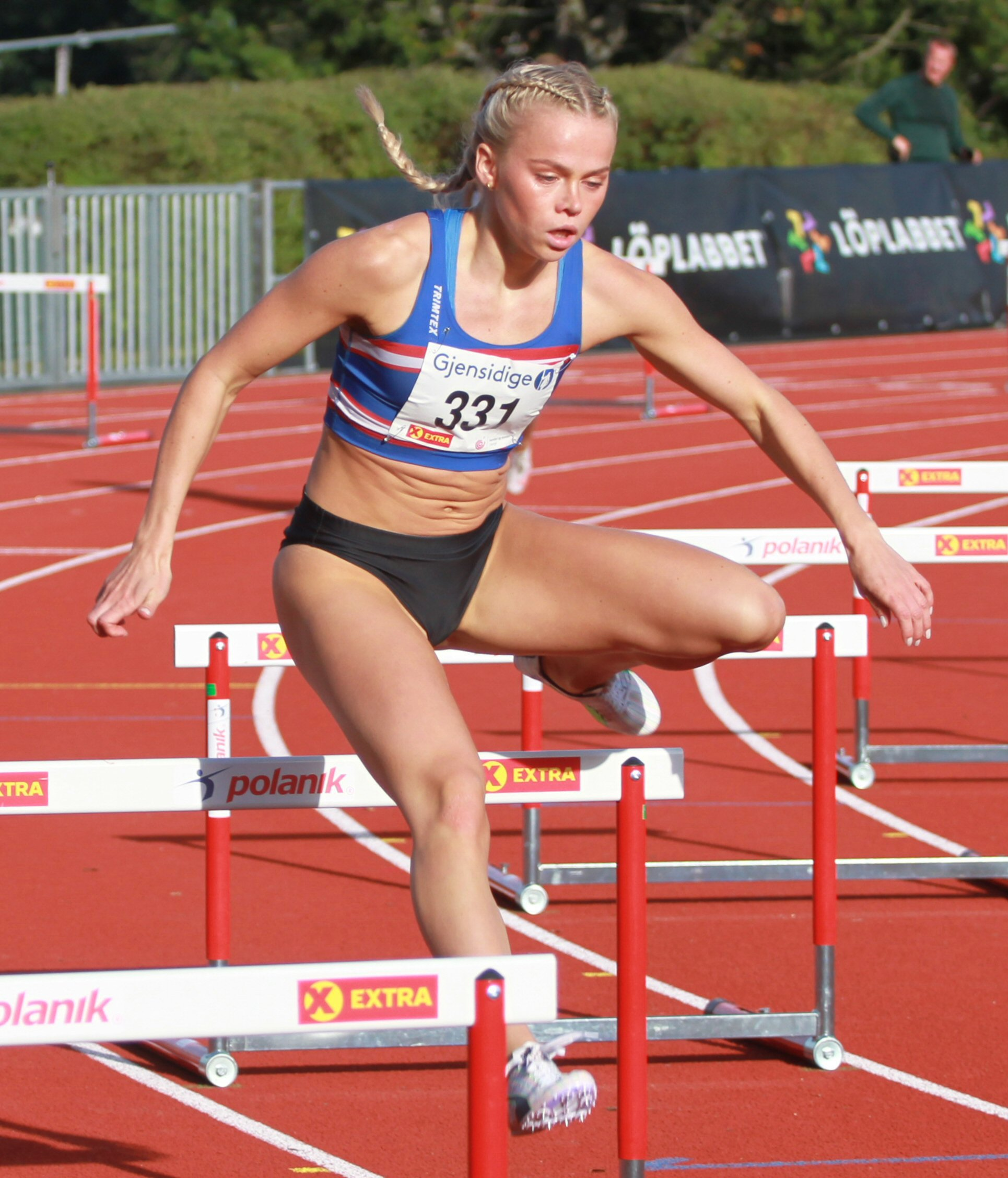
- Rooth racing in 2021

Personal information
- Born: 6 March 2002 (age 24)
Medal record
European U23 Championships
Gold medal – first place	2023 Espoo	400m hurdles
European Athletics U20 Championships
Gold medal – first place	2021 Tallinn	400 m hurdles
Youth Olympic Festival
Silver medal – second place	2019 Baku	400m hurdles

Andrea Rooth (born 6 March 2002) is a Norwegian hurdler. She won gold in the 400m hurdles at the 2021 European Athletics U20 Championships, and has competed at the 2019 European Youth Summer Olympic Festival, 2019 Bislett Games, and was disqualified for a false start in the 100m hurdles at the 2022 European Athletics Championships.

== Family background ==
She is related to the Rooth family of athletes from Oslo. Her cousin is Markus Rooth. 110m hurdles world record holder Colin Jackson is her godfather.
