= Keely Hodgkinson =

English middle-distance runner (born 2002)

Keely Hodgkinson MBE
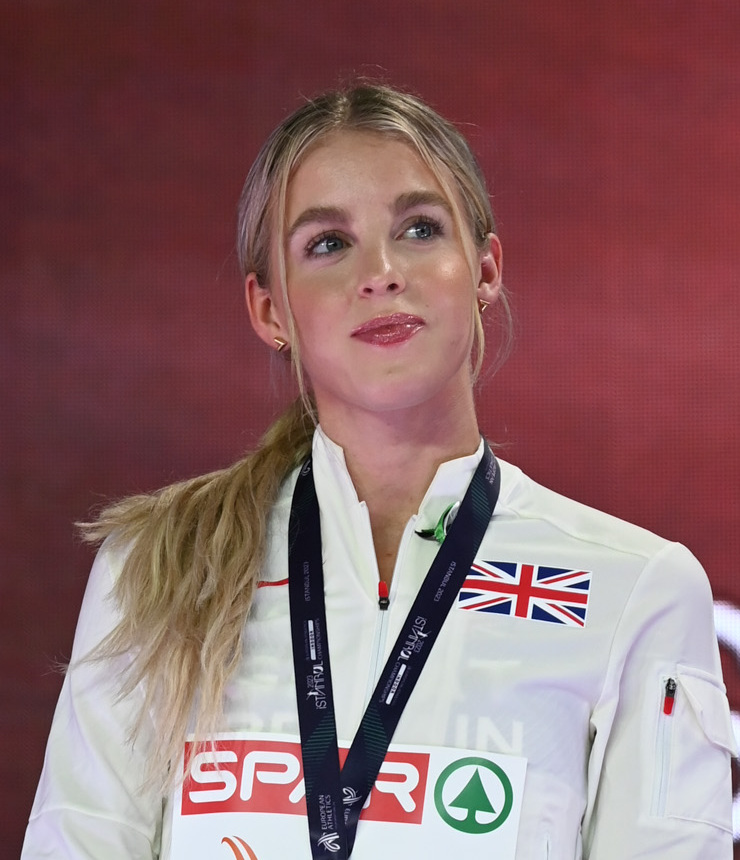
- Hodgkinson at the 2023 European Indoor Championships

Personal information
- Full name: Keely Nicole Hodgkinson
- Born: 3 March 2002 (age 24) Atherton, Greater Manchester, England
- Height: 5 ft 7 in (170 cm)

Sport
- Country: Great Britain; England
- Sport: Athletics
- Events: 400 metres, 800 metres
- Club: Leigh Harriers
- Coached by: Trevor Painter (2019–); Margaret Galvin (–2019)

Achievements and titles
- Highest world ranking: 1st (800 m, 2021); 9th (overall, 2026)
- Personal bests: Long track: 400 m: 51.14 (2026); 800 m: 1:54.33 (2026, NR); Short track: 400 m: 51.49 i (2026); 600 m: 1:23.41 i (2023, WB); 800 m: 1:54.87 i (2026, WR)
Medal record
Women's athletics
Representing Great Britain
Olympic Games
Gold medal – first place	2024 Paris	800 m
Silver medal – second place	2020 Tokyo	800 m
World Championships
Silver medal – second place	2022 Eugene	800 m
Silver medal – second place	2023 Budapest	800 m
Bronze medal – third place	2025 Tokyo	800 m
World Indoor Championships
Gold medal – first place	2026 Toruń	800 m
Diamond League Finals
Winner	2021 Zurich	800 m
European Championships
Gold medal – first place	2022 Munich	800 m
Gold medal – first place	2024 Rome	800 m
Silver medal – second place	2026 Birmingham	800 m
European Indoor Championships
Gold medal – first place	2021 Toruń	800 m
Gold medal – first place	2023 Istanbul	800 m
European U23 Championships
Bronze medal – third place	2023 Espoo	400 m
European U20 Championships
Bronze medal – third place	2019 Borås	800 m
European U18 Championships
Gold medal – first place	2018 Győr	800 m
Representing England
Commonwealth Games
Silver medal – second place	2022 Birmingham	800 m

Keely Nicole Hodgkinson (born 3 March 2002) is an English middle-distance runner specialising in the 800 metres. Over this distance, she won gold medals at the 2024 Summer Olympics and the 2026 World Indoor Championships. She is also a two-time winner at the European Athletics Championships and has won silver and bronze medals at World Championships. Hodgkinson is the world record holder over 800 m indoors and the British record holder over 800 m outdoors. She is a four-time national champion.

At the age of 19, she won the silver medal at the delayed 2020 Summer Olympics, breaking the British record set by Kelly Holmes in 1995. Hodgkinson proceeded to win silver medals at the 2022 World Championships, the 2023 World Championships and the 2022 Commonwealth Games. She became a European outdoors champion in 2022 and 2024 and a European indoor champion in 2021 and 2023. She was also the 2021 Diamond League finals 800 m winner.

At the 2024 Summer Olympics, Hodgkinson led the final from near the start, and then broke away in the last 100 metres to cross the line ahead of Tsige Duguma and Mary Moraa. She was voted BBC Sports Personality of the Year for 2024, and was awarded an MBE for contribution to athletics in the 2025 New Year Honours list. An injury-affected year in 2025 saw Hodgkinson win bronze at the World Athletics Championships.

In 2026, Hodgkinson won the World Indoor title in Torún. During the outdoor season, major new rivalries emerged with Audrey Werro and Femke Broeders-Bol, culminating in second-place finishes for Hodgkinson behind Werro and ahead of Broeders-Bol at both the European Athletics Championships and the World Athletics Ultimate Championship.

== Early life and background ==
Keely Nicole Hodgkinson was born on 3 March 2002 in Atherton, Greater Manchester, and grew up there. She attended Fred Longworth High School in Tyldesley, where she was friends with fellow pupil and future England footballer Ella Toone. Hodgkinson also attended Loughborough College in Leicestershire. In 2021, she began a degree in criminology at Leeds Beckett University, but later dropped out to focus on her athletics career.

== Athletics career ==
=== 2011–2017: Early career ===
Hodgkinson joined Leigh Harriers at the age of nine and won county championships in middle-distance events. She also swam with Howe Bridge Aces Swimming Club before devoting herself fully to running.

In 2012, aged ten, she competed at the British Schools Modern Biathlon Championships in London. Hodgkinson finished second in the 500 m run, and after the 50 m swim, she ended in eighth place overall. Her father encouraged her to focus on athletics rather than swimming, and she was inspired by Jessica Ennis-Hill winning the gold medal in the heptathlon at the 2012 Summer Olympics.

In 2013, she became the first Leigh Harrier to claim the individual U11 girls' title in both the South East Lancashire League and the Red Rose League. She ran her 16th consecutive undefeated race two weeks later in the Mid-Lancashire Cross Country League at U11 level. At U13 level, she became Cheshire and Manchester champion in both the 800 and 1200 m. In 2014, she took her third Greater Manchester U13 title on a cross country course.

At the age of 13, Hodgkinson had to limit training after a mastoidectomy to remove a tumour on her ear, which left her 95% deaf in that ear. She also suffered from knee issues. The following year, she finished third in the U15 800 m events at both the ESAA English Schools' Athletics Championships and England Athletics Championships. In 2017, she raced the 800 m in the U17 age category, and won her first gold medal at the England Championships, before adding the 1500 m UK School Games title.

=== 2018–2020 ===
In June 2018, aged 16, Hodgkinson became the England U20 800 m champion. The following month, she won the gold medal at the European Athletics U18 Championships held in Győr, Hungary, breaking the championship record in the process with a time of 2:04.84. In August, she won the England U17 title before setting a competition record time of 2:04.89 on way to victory at the (UK) School Games. At the Believe Sports Awards in Wigan, she was named as the Sports Achiever of the Year. In June 2019, Hodgkinson competed at the England U20 Championships, placing second, and she earned bronze at the European U20 Championships in Borås, Sweden. During 2019, Trevor Painter and Jenny Meadows began coaching her in Manchester.

In February 2020, aged 17, Hodgkinson set the second-fastest female U20 performance ever in the indoor 800 m at the Vienna Indoor Classic. She set a European U20 record of 2:01.16 to triumph on her international debut at senior level, just 0.13 s off the world U20 record. She broke Kirsty Wade's long-standing British U20 record of 2:02.88 set in 1981, and Aníta Hinriksdóttir's European record for the age group set in 2015 by 0.4 seconds. Later that month, she went on to take the national senior 800 m title at the British Indoor Championships. At the end of August, she competed at the Göteborg GP in Sweden, recording a new personal best of 2:01.78. The 2020 season was heavily impacted by the COVID-19 pandemic, with the 2020 Summer Olympics postponed until the following year. In September, Hodgkinson claimed the British outdoor title to become the youngest winner in the competition over 800 m since 1974. She improved her personal best again with a time 2:01.73, when ending her season with a fifth-place finish in Rovereto, Italy, three days later.

=== 2021: Olympic silver medallist and Diamond League title ===
In Vienna, Hodgkinson became the first British woman to set a world U20 record since Zola Budd 36 years previously. She won the 800 m for the second consecutive year with a time of 1:59.03. This marked the first time that she had completed the event in under two minutes, and also broke the world indoor U20 record. She shaved two seconds off the previous best set by Ethiopia's Meskerem Legesse in 2004. Hodgkinson competed at the 2021 European Indoor Championships in Toruń, Poland. She became the second youngest British winner in the competition's history (after 400 m runner Marilyn Neufville in 1970), and also the youngest ever women's 800 m European indoor champion.

In May, Hodgkinson secured victory at the Golden Spike in Ostrava, Czechia, recording a sub-two minute mark outdoors for the first time after clocking 1:58.89. She broke by almost a second the UK junior record which had been held by Charlotte Moore. Her time was also the European junior record, beating Birte Bruhns' mark of 1:59.17 set in 1988. At the end of June, she secured a place in the British team for the Tokyo Olympics by defending her title at the 2021 British Athletics Championships. She overcame Laura Muir and Jemma Reekie to seal victory. A week later, she set a British U23 record by lowering her personal best to 1:57.51 when finishing fourth at the Stockholm Diamond League meet.

At the 2020 Summer Olympics, Hodgkinson won the silver medal behind the USA's Athing Mu, taking almost two seconds off her personal best with a time of 1:55.88. Hodgkinson also broke Kelly Holmes' 26-year-old British record of 1:56.21 in the race, as well as setting new European U20 and U23 records. After the race, Hodgkinson stated that the Olympics' postponement had benefitted her, saying: "If the Olympics had been last year I wouldn't have been here, but suddenly it's given me a year to grow and compete with these girls."

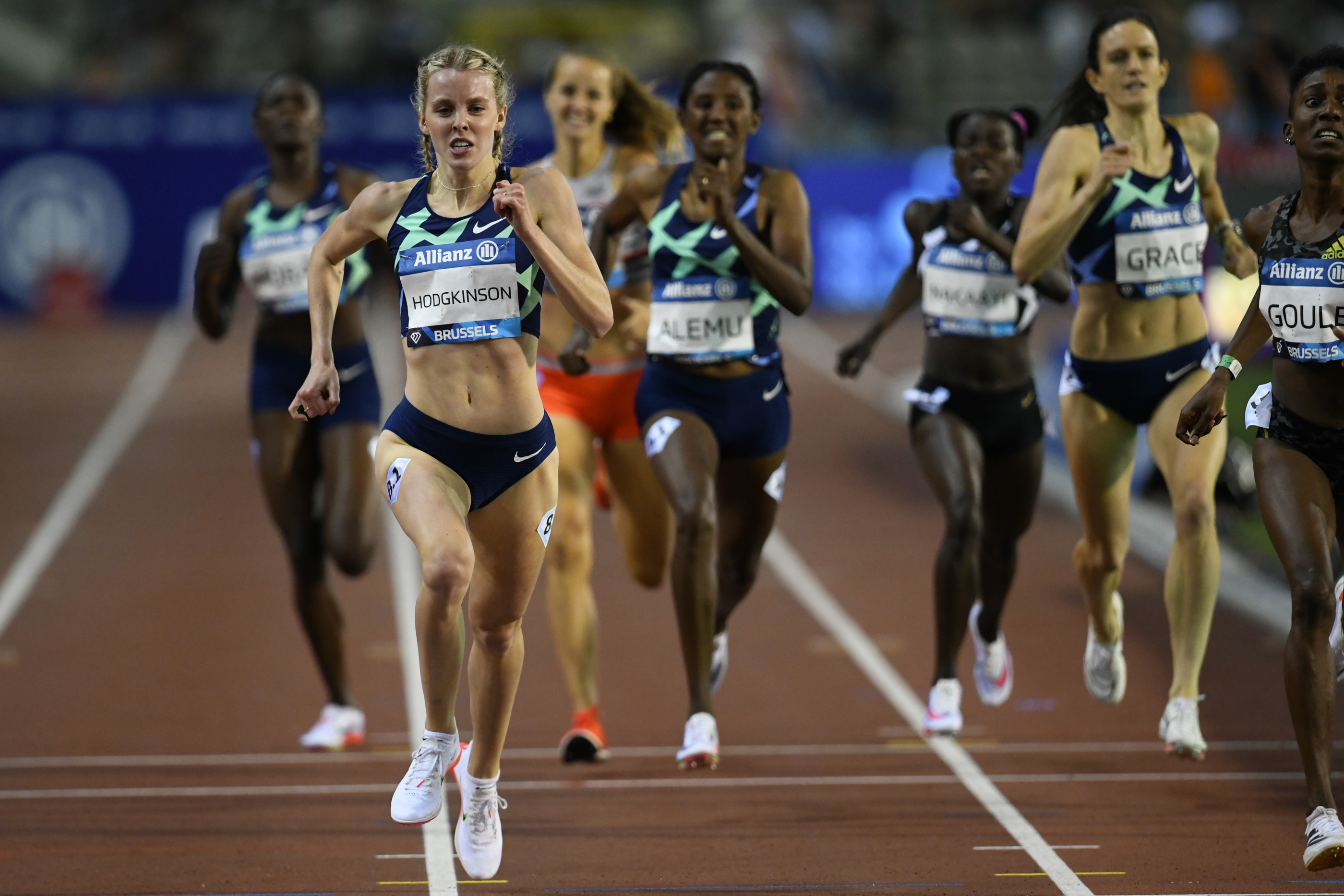
Hodgkinson won her first Diamond Trophy (800 m) in 2021. Pictured (L) at the Memorial Van Damme in Brussels.

On the Diamond League circuit, Hodgkinson came second in Brussels, and ended the season with victory at the Zürich final in September, winning the Diamond League 800 m title.

Hodgkinson's early athletics career had been funded by her parents, but in 2020, she was not named by British Athletics as a recipient of £15,000 of lottery funding. Businessman Barrie Wells, who had previously helped fund 18 athletes to the 2012 London Olympics, stepped in and roughly matched the £15,000 a year that she had missed out on. This allowed Hodgkinson to attend warm-weather training in Florida. In October 2021, British Athletics announced that Hodgkinson would receive lottery funding.

=== 2022: European champion and world silver medallist ===
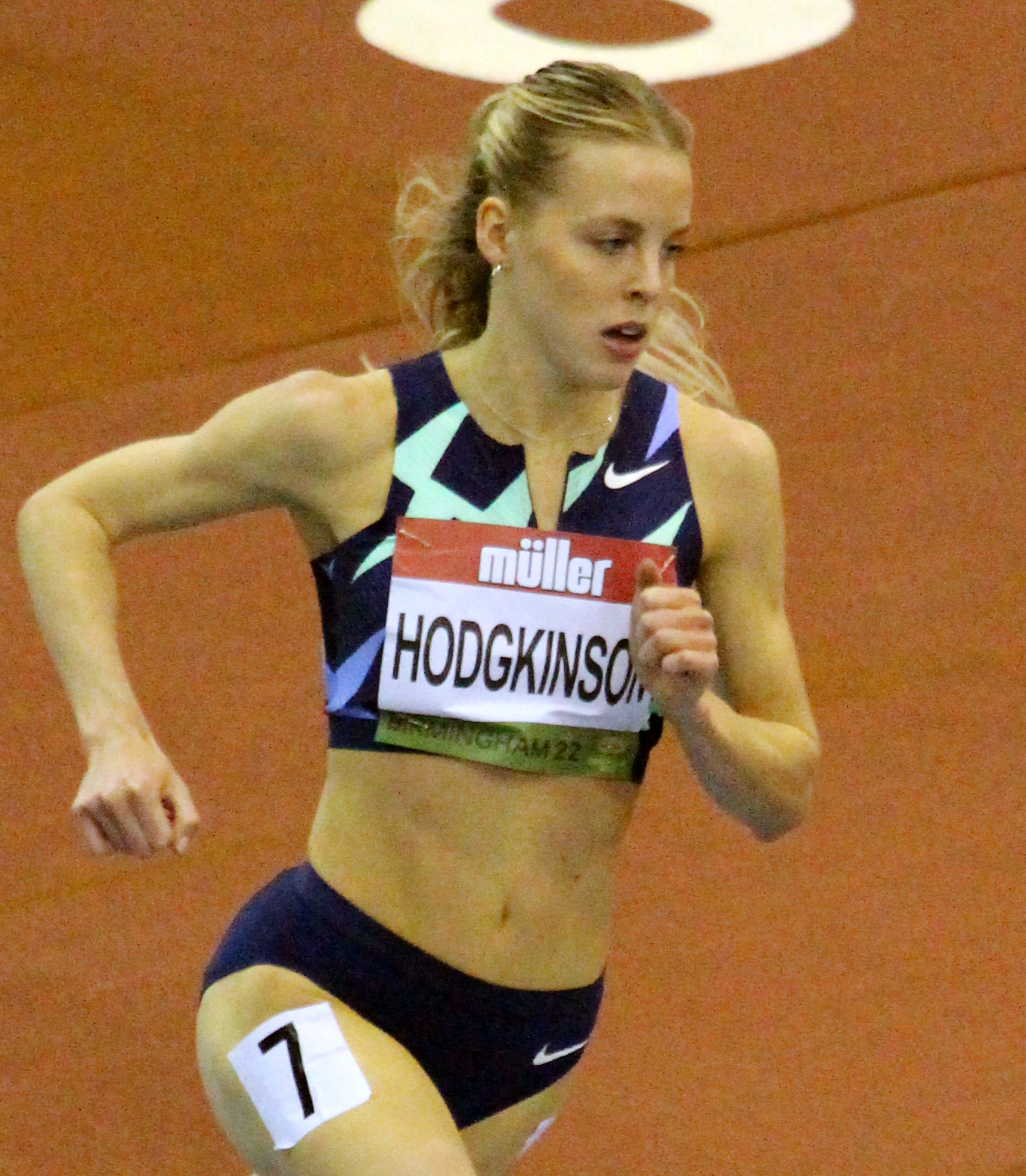
In February 2022, Keely Hodgkinson recorded the fastest indoor 800 m time by a woman in 20 years.

At the beginning of the season, Hodgkinson revealed that she was targeting medals at the World Indoor Championships in March as well as three major outdoor championships in the summer: the World Championships, Commonwealth Games and the European Championships. Hodgkinson said: "It's definitely physically possible to do all four. Mentally, we'll see. The world outdoors is No 1 and I really want to do the Commonwealths, as it is a home Games. With the Europeans we'll see how the body and mind are coping."

Hodgkinson opened her athletics year on 19 February with the fastest indoor 800 m performance by a woman in 20 years with 1:57.20, at the Birmingham Indoor Grand Prix. It was the quickest mark since the precise day she was born, when the indoor world record was set by Jolanda Čeplak. Her time set a new British indoor record, the fastest ever mark by a teenager, and the sixth-fastest indoor mark of all time. In March, Hodgkinson travelled to the World Indoor Championships in Belgrade. She suffered a quad injury during her warm-up for the event and was forced to withdraw.

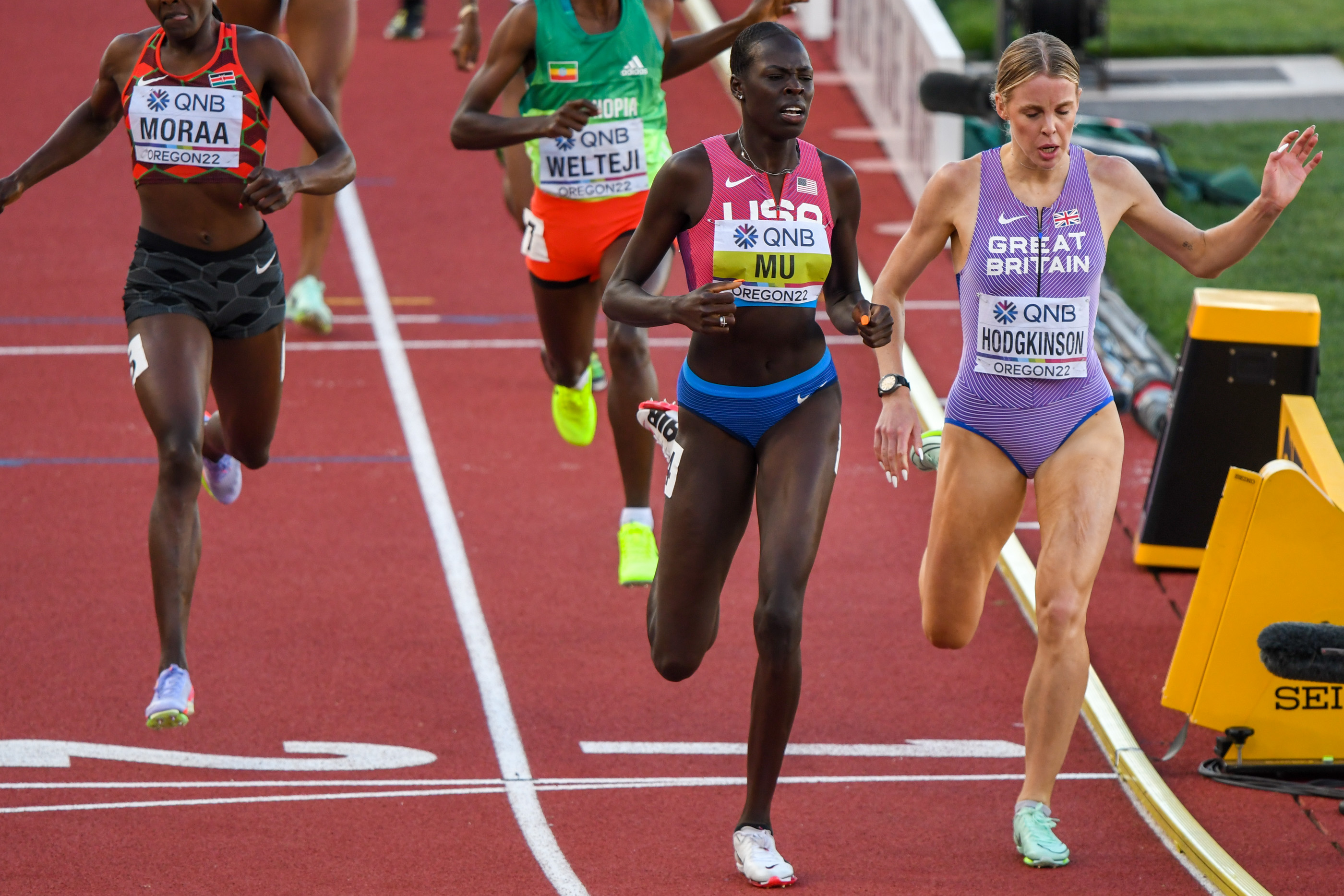
Only 0.08 s separated the winner (C) and the runner-up (R) at the 2022 World Athletics Championships in the US.

On 21 May, Hodgkinson competed at the Diamond League event in Birmingham, claiming victory in the 800 m. She then had further success in the Diamond League, claiming victories in Eugene, and Oslo, as well as finishing runner-up behind Kenyan athlete Mary Moraa in Stockholm.

In the 800 m at the World Athletics Championships in Eugene, Hodgkinson claimed silver after finishing 0.08 s behind Mu. Hodgkinson recorded a season's best time of 1:56.38. Less than two weeks later, at the Commonwealth Games, she claimed another silver medal, this time finishing behind Moraa. Later in August, she secured her first major senior outdoor gold, winning the 800 m at the European Championships held in Munich in a time of 1:59.04. She finished half a second ahead of French athlete Rénelle Lamote who claimed silver.

In September, she finished in fifth place at the Zürich Diamond League final. Hodgkinson's time at the Birmingham indoor event earlier in the year made her the world leader for the season with a nearly 1.3-second advantage, while her result from the World Championships final ranked as the second quickest time for the year outdoors.

=== 2023: World silver medallist again ===
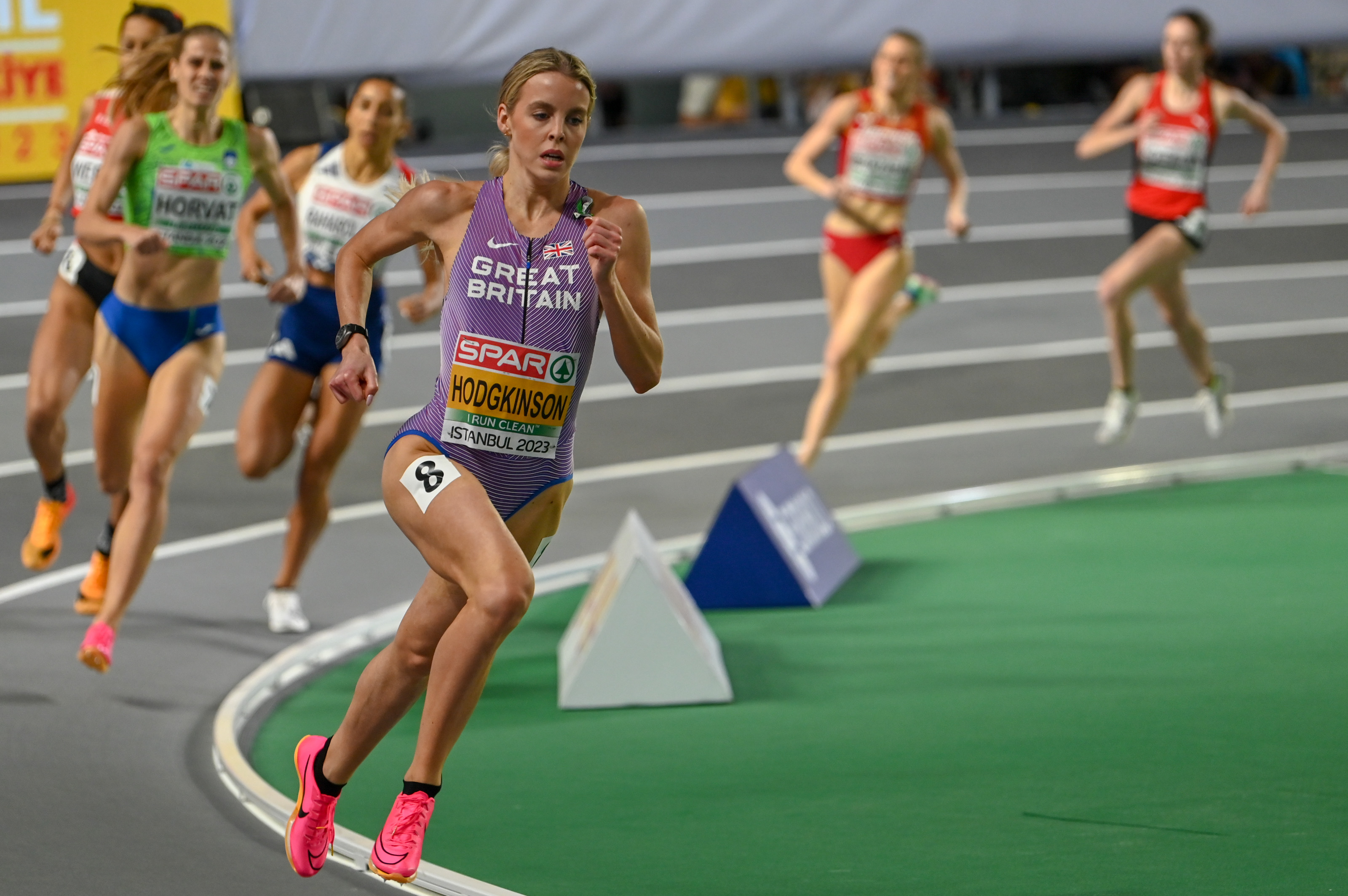
Hodgkinson won her third European title at Istanbul 2023 to extend her streak of sub-two-minute races to 19.

In January, Hodgkinson set a new world indoor record time in the less frequently run distance of 600 metres with a time of 1:23.41 in Manchester. She eclipsed Olga Kotlyarova's record set in 2004 by 0.03 s. She then won three events on the World Indoor Tour in the 800 m category. She took victories in Toruń (meet record of 1:57.87), Liévin in France, and the Tour Final in Birmingham, where she improved her own British indoor record with 1:57.18. She concluded her indoor season with a successful defence of her European 800 m title at the European Athletics Indoor Championships in Istanbul. She dedicated the win to her first coach in athletics, Joe Galvin, who had died a few days earlier, saying: "This one is definitely for him and everyone at home. He had a lot of belief in little 10-year-old me."

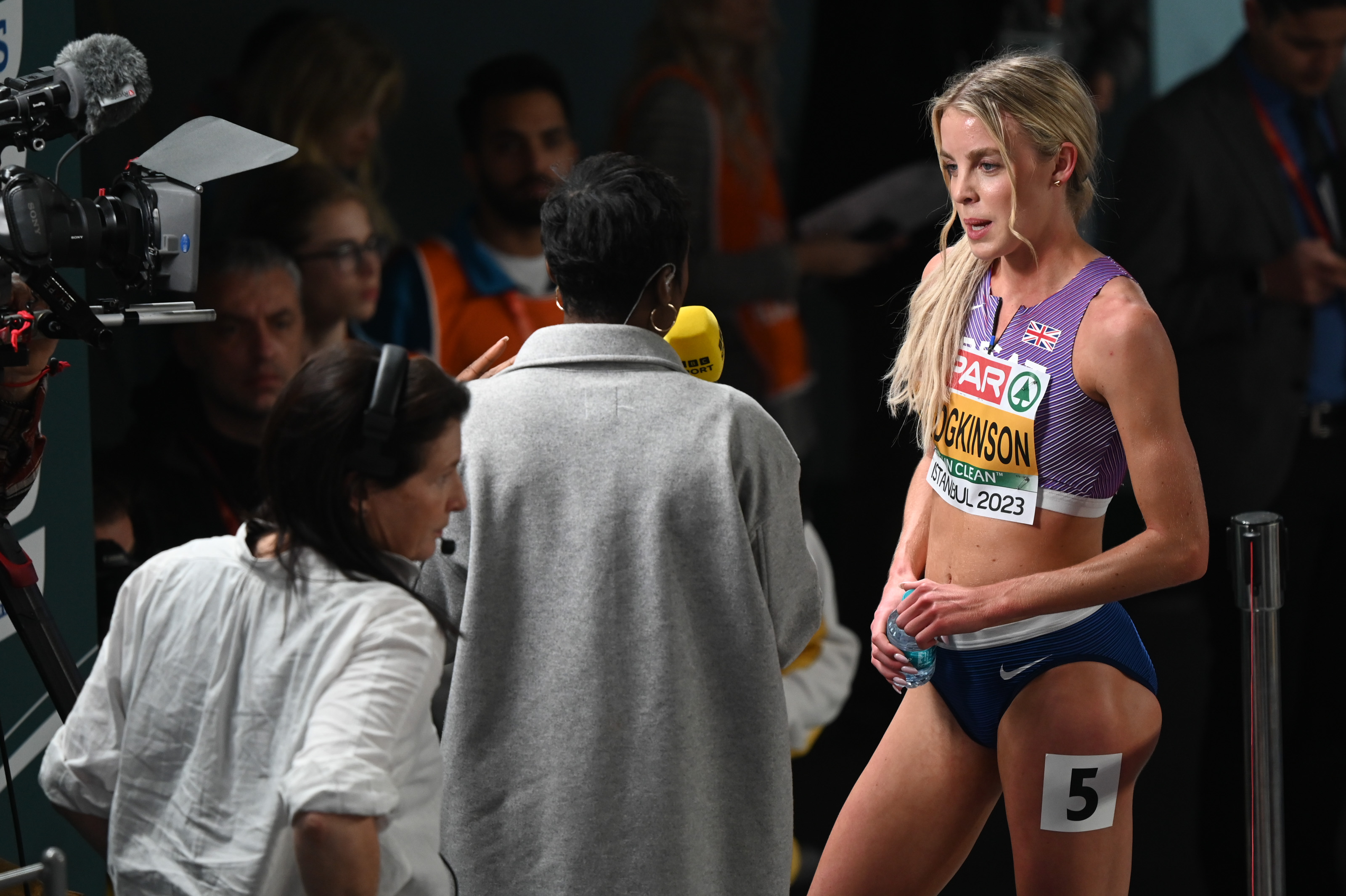
Keely Hodgkinson interviewed at the 2023 European Indoor Championships in Istanbul.

In the 2023 Diamond League, Hodgkinson clinched victory at the Meeting de Paris in June, breaking her British record by 0.11 s in a time of 1:55.77. She also won the 400 m at the England U23s with a new personal best time of 52.24. The time was also a championship record, eclipsing the mark of 52.43 set by Christine Ohuruogu in 2005. She then finished second to Moraa in the 800 m at the Lausanne Diamond League meeting in Switzerland. Hodgkinson defended her 800 m National Championships title with a stadium-record time of 1:58.26 in Manchester. Having been appointed co-captain of the British team at the European U23 Championships in Espoo, Finland, she competed in the 400 m. Hodgkinson went on to secure bronze, clocking a new personal best of 51.76. She later missed the Anniversary Games Diamond League meeting in London due to illness.

At the World Championships in Budapest, Hodgkinson passed Mu in the final straight, but could not overhaul Moraa at the finish, ultimately finishing second in the 800 m with a time of 1:56.34, around 0.3 s separating her from both the champion Moraa (1:56.03) and third-placed Mu (1:56.61). Hodgkinson finished runner-up to Mu in the Eugene Diamond League final, and improved on her own British record with a time of 1:55.19.

=== 2024: Olympic champion ===
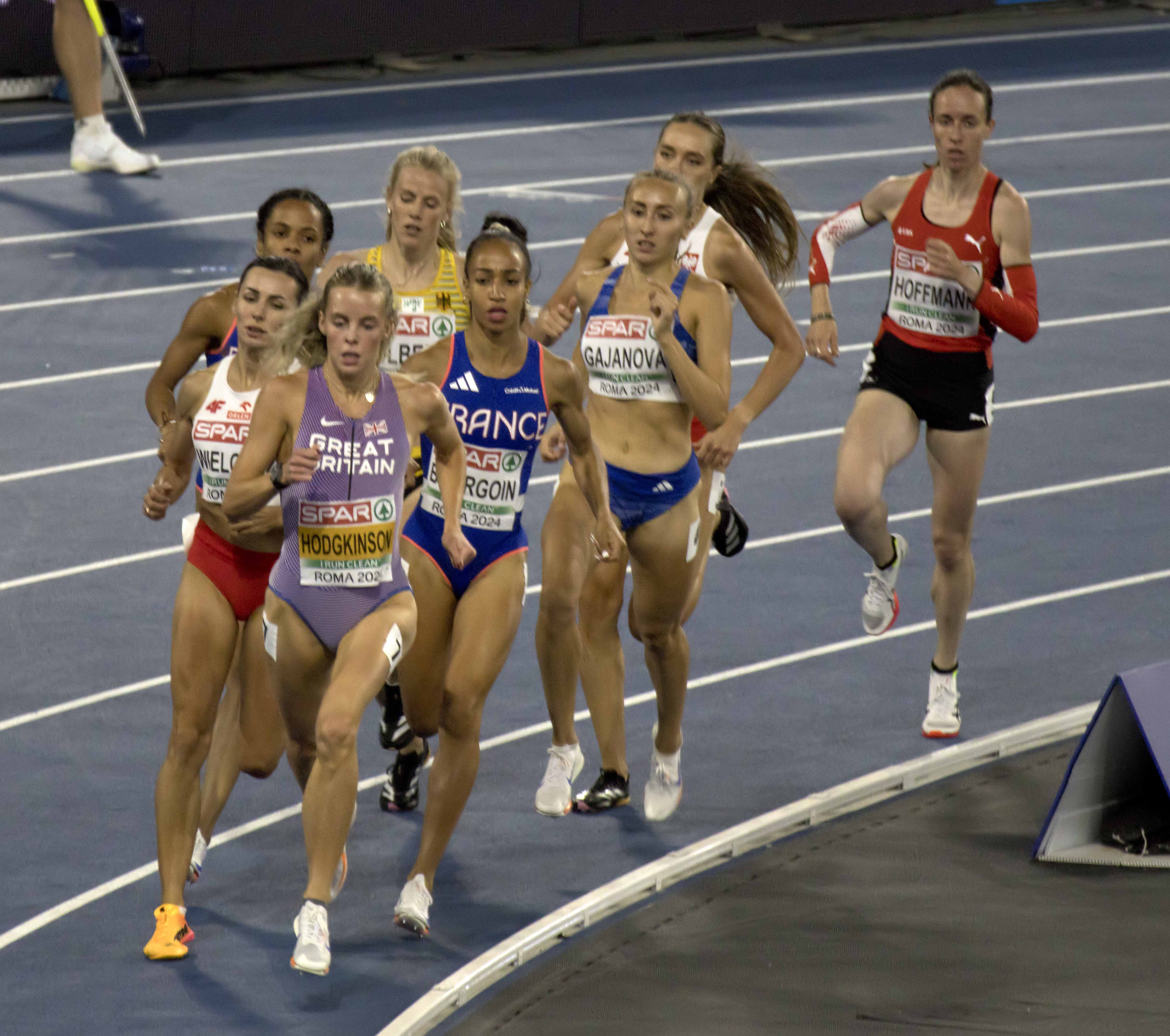
Hodgkinson in the lead during the 800 m final at the 2024 European Championships

Hodgkinson opened her 2024 season on 15 May, running a 400 m personal best time of 51.61 at a meeting in Savona, Italy. She finished second behind Ireland's Sharlene Mawdsley. On 25 May, she competed in her first 800 m event of the season at the Prefontaine Classic Diamond League meeting in Eugene, Oregon. Hodgkinson overtook Moraa with 150 metres remaining and claimed victory in a world-leading time for the year of 1:55.78.

In June, Hodgkinson competed in the 800 m at the European Championships in Rome, while suffering from illness. She held off Gabriela Gajanová to retain the European title she had won two years previously. In July, at the Diamond League meeting in London, Hodgkinson finished in first place and also set a new British 800 m record time of 1:54:61. Her time made her the sixth fastest woman in history over the distance. Hodgkinson also triumphed at the FBK Games in Hengelo, pulling away from Prudence Sekgodiso on the final bend to secure the victory in a time of 1:57.36.

At the 2024 Summer Olympics, Hodgkinson clinched the gold medal in the women's 800 m final with a time of 1:56.72. Tsige Duguma finished second in 1:57.15. Hodgkinson became the third British woman to have won Olympic gold at the distance, and the tenth British woman to win an athletics gold in the history of the games. A large mural was then painted at Stevenson Square in Manchester to honour her achievement. On 21 August, she announced she would miss the rest of the season due to injury. At the end of the year, Hodgkinson stated her ambition to break the women's 800 m world record held by Jarmila Kratochvílová who ran 1:53.28 in 1983.

=== 2025: World Championship bronze medallist ===
In February, Hodgkinson intended to try and break Čeplak's 23-year-old indoor 800 m world record at the Keely Klassic, a new competition named after her, but was forced to withdraw two days prior due to a hamstring tear. Hodgkinson took part in her first race in over a year at the Diamond League event in Silesia on 16 August. She won in a new 800 m world leading time for the year of 1:54.74, which was also her second fastest time ever.

On 20 August, Hodgkinson secured back-to-back victories in the Diamond League with a win in Lausanne. Her time of 1:55.69 was a meeting record, and she finished in front of Swiss athlete Audrey Werro and fellow Briton Georgia Hunter Bell. In September, she won a bronze medal in the 800 metres at the 2025 World Athletics Championships in Tokyo after finishing behind Kenya's Lilian Odira and Hunter Bell. The following month, she was the 800 m champion at the Athlos meet in New York. She finished more than a second ahead of Hunter Bell in a time of 1:56.53.

=== 2026: Indoor 800 m world record and World Indoor Champion ===
On 14 February, she improved her own British 800 m record to 1:56.33 at the British Indoor Championships, before setting a new indoor 800 m world record of 1:54.87, in Liévin, France, on 19 February 2026. The latter time was just under a second quicker than the previous record set by Jolanda Čeplak on 3 March 2002, the day of Hodgkinson's birth. Hodgkinson finished the race more than three seconds faster than Werro and Duguma who placed second and third. The following month, she set a new personal best indoor time of 51.49 in the 400 m in an invitational race in Glasgow.

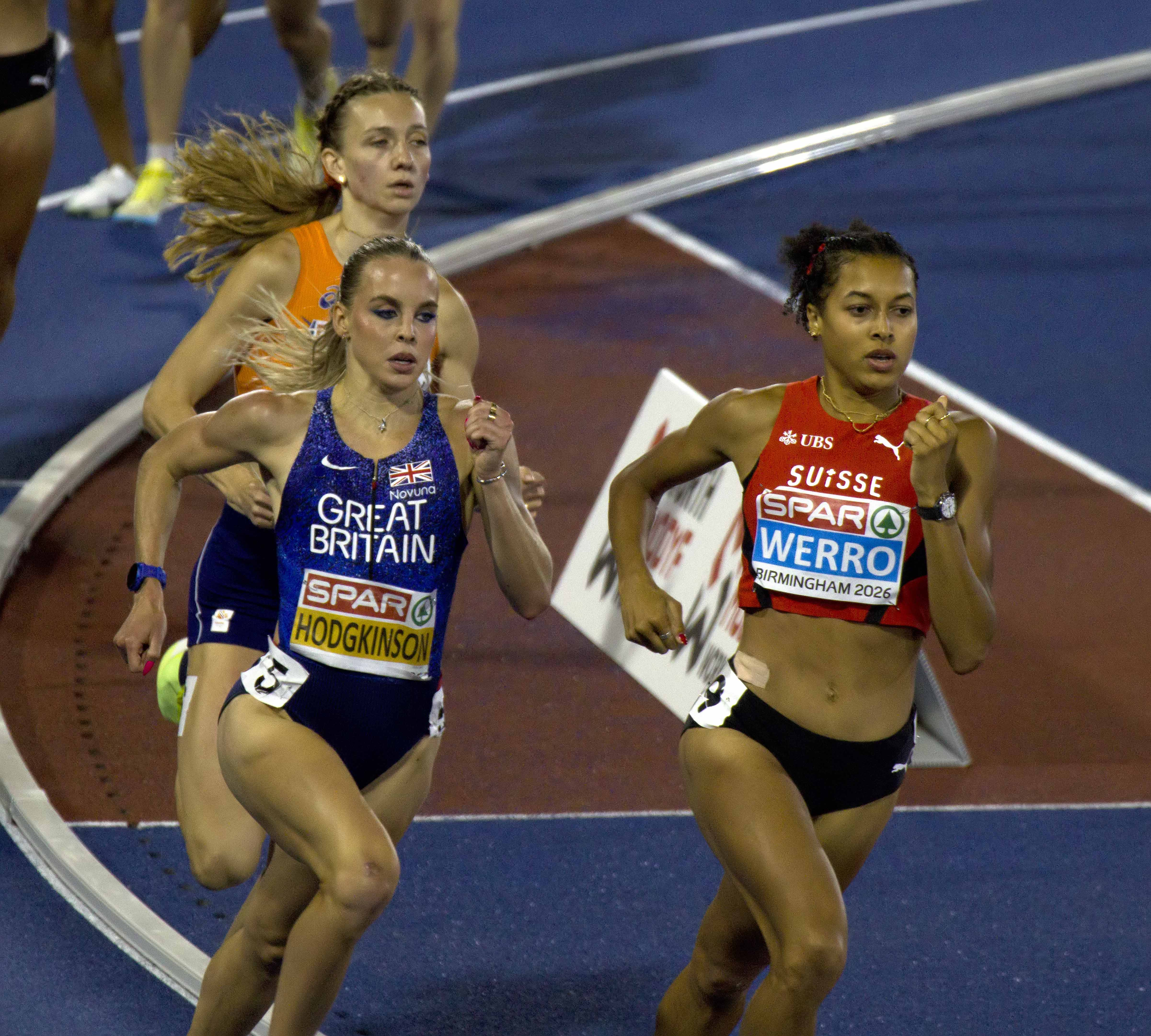
Hodgkinson (left) entering the last 100 m of the 800 m final at the 2026 European Athletics Championships.

On 22 March 2026, Hodgkinson won gold in the 800 m at the 2026 World Athletics Indoor Championships, finishing with a time of 1:55.30 (the second-fastest indoor time in history) and a winning margin of 1.34 seconds from silver-medallist Werro. Later that evening, she ran with Tess McHugh, Louisa Stoney and Dina Asher-Smith as part of the British quartet that placed fifth in the women's 4 × 400 metres relay final, with Hodgkinson's split time of 50.10 s being the fastest of the race.

On 4 June, Hodgkinson ran a personal best for the 400 m of 51.14 at the Golden Gala in Rome, part of the 2026 Diamond League, finishing seventh. On her first outdoor 800 m race of the season on 7 June, Hodgkinson set a new British national record of 1:54.33 in the Diamond League at the 2026 Bauhausgalan in Stockholm, placing second to Werro. Later that month, she withdrew from the final of the 400 m at the British Championships with muscle tightness. Hodgkinson was not named by England in their athletics squad for the 2026 Commonwealth Games, with the Briton instead choosing to focus on the upcoming European Championships. At the Diamond League meeting in Eugene, Hodgkinson finished runner-up to Kenya's Odira. She then claimed victory in the 800 m at the 2026 London Athletics Meet, winning in a time of 1:56.21 to finish ahead of Dutch runner Femke Broeders-Bol.

On 14 August, Hodgkinson won the silver medal in the 800 m at the 2026 European Athletics Championships, after she was beaten by Werro. The Swiss athlete led from the first lap and Hodgkinson was unable to catch her on the final straight, finishing in 1:55.01 to Werro's championship record 1:54.81. After missing Diamond League races in Brussels and Zurich due to a hamstring tear, Hodgkinson returned to action at the World Athletics Ultimate Championship in Budapest, where she finished runner-up to Werro in the 800 m. Werro took control of the race from the first lap, with Hodgkinson overtaking Broeders-Bol on the home straight to come second in a time of 1:56.26. She called the trio's developing rivalry as "great for our sport". On 18 September, she ended her season with a victory in the 800 m at the Athlos meet. Hodgkinson wore a speedsuit as she finished over two seconds ahead of Switzerland's Valentina Rosamilia in the race at the StoneX Stadium in London.

== Personal life ==
Hodgkinson has a keen interest in fashion and attended London Fashion Week in 2024. Speaking about her approach to combining her athletics with her love for fashion, Hodgkinson has stated: "I get ready for a track meet as if I'm going out. It's like a stage; you're preparing to perform." In July 2026, a clothing and footwear line designed by Hodgkinson in collaboration with Nike was launched.

Hodgkinson has shared how she suffered a bout of depression 'from the comedown' following her silver medal at the delayed 2020 Summer Olympics. She explained that she had taken up playing the piano to help her deal with it. She is a supporter of Premier League football club Manchester United, and was invited onto the pitch at Old Trafford after winning Olympic gold in 2024.

In September 2026, Hodgkinson said that an MRI scan she undertook following a hamstring injury in 2025 had revealed an abnormality to the muscle. Her hamstring is split, giving her two tendons, meaning that if one of the tendons is torn, she can still continue running, but it could make her more susceptible to hamstring injury.

== Personal bests ==
Information taken from World Athletics profile unless otherwise noted.

Personal best times for individual events
Event	Time	Venue	Date	Notes
400 metres	51.14	Rome, Italy	4 June 2026	
400 metres short track	51.49 i	Glasgow, United Kingdom	1 March 2026	
600 metres	1:23.41 i	Manchester, United Kingdom	28 January 2023	
600 metres short track	1:23.41 i	Manchester, United Kingdom	28 January 2023	World best
800 metres	1:54.33	Stockholm, Sweden	7 June 2026	British record
800 metres short track	1:54.87 i	Liévin, France	19 February 2026	World record
1500 metres	4:30.00	Loughborough, United Kingdom	1 September 2017	(age 15; also 4:29.05 in 2018 Mx)

=== Progression ===
Key: Lifetime best (in bold)

Season's best results in the 800 metres
Year	800 m	Notes	Season rank	800 m short track	Notes	Season rank
2017	2:06.85		507	—N/a		
2018	2:04.26		233	—N/a		
2019	2:03.40		174	—N/a		
2020	2:01.73		44	2:01.16 i	AU20R	13
2021	1:55.88	AU20R AU23R NR	2	1:59.03 i	WU20R (Note: World indoor under-20 record until 27 February 2021.) AU20R	4
2022	1:56.38		2	1:57.20 i	AU23R (Note: Although European Athletic Association recognises under-20 and U23 records outdoors, it, however, acknowledges only U20 age category in indoor competitions.) NR	1
2023	1:55.19	AU23R NR	2	1:57.18 i	AU23R NR	1
2024	1:54.61	AU23R NR	1	—N/a		
2025	1:54.74		2	—N/a		
2026	**1:54.33**	NR		**1:54.87** i	WR	

Season rank from World Athletics' Season Top Lists

== Competition results ==
Information taken from World Athletics profile unless otherwise noted.

=== International competitions ===
Representing Great Britain & England
Year	Competition	Venue	Position	Event	Time	Notes
2018	European U18 Championships	Győr, Hungary	1st	800 m	2:04.84	CR
2019	European U20 Championships	Borås, Sweden	3rd	800 m	2:03.40	PB
2021	European Indoor Championships	Toruń, Poland	1st	800 m	2:03.88 i	
2021	Olympic Games	Tokyo, Japan	2nd	800 m	1:55.88	AU20R AU23R
2022	World Championships	Eugene, OR, United States	2nd	800 m	1:56.38	SB
2022	Commonwealth Games	Birmingham, United Kingdom	2nd	800 m	1:57.40	
2022	European Championships	Munich, Germany	1st	800 m	1:59.04	
2023	European Indoor Championships	Istanbul, Turkey	1st	800 m	1:58.66 i	
2023	European U23 Championships	Espoo, Finland	3rd	400 m	51.76	PB
2023	World Championships	Budapest, Hungary	2nd	800 m	1:56.34	
2024	European Championships	Rome, Italy	1st	800 m	1:58.65	
2024	Olympic Games	Paris, France	1st	800 m	1:56.72	
2025	World Championships	Tokyo, Japan	3rd	800 m	1:54.91	
2026	World Indoor Championships	Toruń, Poland	1st	800 m	1:55.30 i	
2026	World Indoor Championships	Toruń, Poland	5th	4 × 400 m relay	3:28.09 i	
2026	European Championships	Birmingham, United Kingdom	2nd	800 m	1:55.01	
2026	Ultimate Championship	Budapest, Hungary	2nd	800 m	1:56.26	

=== Circuit wins and titles ===
800 metres wins, other events specified in parentheses.

- Diamond League women's 800 metres champion: 2021
  - 2021: Zürich Weltklasse
  - 2022: Birmingham Diamond League, Eugene Prefontaine Classic (WL), Oslo Bislett Games (SB)
  - 2023: Paris Meeting (WL NR)
  - 2024: Eugene Prefontaine Classic (WL), London Athletics Meet (WL, MR, NR)
  - 2025: Chorzów Kamila Skolimowska Memorial (WL), Athletissima (MR)
  - 2026: London Athletics Meet
- World Athletics Continental Tour
  - 2021: Ostrava Golden Spike
  - 2024: Fanny Blankers-Koen Games
- World Athletics Indoor Tour women's 800 metres overall winner: 2023
  - 2022: Birmingham Indoor Grand Prix (WL MR NR)
  - 2023: Manchester World Indoor Tour (600 m, WB), Toruń Copernicus Cup (WL MR), Liévin Meeting Hauts-de-France Pas-de-Calais (WL), Birmingham World Indoor Tour Final (NR)
  - 2026: Liévin Meeting Hauts-de-France Pas-de-Calais (WR)

=== National championships and competitions ===
Track results only. Hodgkinson competed also at the ECCA English Championships (2014, 2016, 2017, 2018) with best place being fifth on a 5 km course in 2018, and at the cross country ESAA Championships (2016, 2017, 2018) with best place being second on a 3.8 km course also in 2018.

Year	Competition	Venue	Position	Event	Time	Notes
2016	ESAA English Schools' Championships, U15 events	Gateshead	3rd	800 m	2:13.08	
2016	England Championships, U15 events	Bedford	3rd	800 m	2:12.53	
2017	ESAA English Schools' Championships, U17 events	Birmingham	4th	800 m	2:08.82	
2017	England Championships, U17 events	Bedford	1st	800 m	2:06.85	
2017	(UK) School Games, U17 events	Loughborough	1st	1500 m	4:30.00	
2018	England Championships, U20 events	Bedford	1st	800 m	2:04.41	
2018	England Championships, U17 events	Bedford	1st	800 m	2:09.38	
2018	(UK) School Games, U17 events	Loughborough	1st	800 m	2:04.89	GR
2019	England Championships, U20 events	Bedford	2nd	800 m	2:05.77	
2020	British Indoor Championships	Glasgow	1st	800 m	2:04.37 i	
2020	British Championships	Manchester	1st	800 m	2:03.24	
2021	British Championships	Manchester	1st	800 m	1:59.61	
2022	British Indoor Championships	Birmingham	2nd	400 m	52.42 i	PB
2022	British Championships	Manchester	5th	400 m	52.41	PB
2023	England Championships, U23 events	Chelmsford	1st	400 m	52.24	PB NR CR
2023	British Championships	Manchester	1st	800 m	1:58.26	SR
2024	British Championships	Manchester	7th	400 m	52.22	
2026	UK Indoor Championships	Birmingham	–	800 m	1:56.33 i	NR
2026	UK Championships	Birmingham	DNS	400 m	N/A	

== Honours and awards ==
2018

- Believe Sports Awards: Sports Achiever of the Year
- British Athletics Supporters Club: BASC Young Female Athlete of the Year

2021

- British Athletics Writers' Association: Cliff Temple Award for British Female Athlete of the Year
- British Athletics Supporters Club: BASC Athlete of the Year

2023

- Believe Star on the Walk of Fame outside Leigh Town Hall

2024

- BBC Sports Personality of the Year Award
- MBE for contribution to athletics in the King's New Year Honours
- Sunday Times Sportswoman of the Year
- British Athletics Supporters Club: BASC Athlete of the Year

2026

- World Athletics: Athlete of the Month (February 2026)
- European Athletics: Athlete of the Month (February 2026), (March 2026)
