= Berta Segura =

Spanish athlete (born 2003)

Personal information
- Full name: Berta Segura Berenjeno
- Nationality: Spanish
- Born: 6 June 2003 (age 23) Lleida (Lérida)
- Height: 170 cm (5 ft 7 in)

Sport
- Sport: Athletics
- Event: 400 metres

Achievements and titles
- Personal best(s): 400 m:: 51.68 (La Nucia, 2024)
Medal record
Women's athletics
Representing Spain
European U23 Championships
Silver medal – second place	2025 Bergen	4x400 m relay
Bronze medal – third place	2023 Espoo	4 × 400 m relay
European U20 Championships
Silver medal – second place	2021 Tallinn	4 × 400 m relay

Berta Segura Berenjeno (Note: In this Spanish name, the first or paternal surname is Segura and the second or maternal family name is Berenjeno.) (born 6 June 2003) is a Spanish sprinter. She became Spanish champion in 2024 over 400 metres.

== Career ==
In July 2021, she was part of the Spanish 4 × 400 m relay team that won silver at the 2021 European Athletics U20 Championships in Tallinn.

In May 2022, she won gold in a Spanish U23 record time in the 4 × 400 m relay at the 2022 Ibero-American Championships in Athletics. In August 2022, she was part of the Spanish 4 × 400 m relay team qualified for the final of the 2022 European Athletics Championships, in Munich, in which they finished eighth. In August 2022, she qualified for the final of the 400 metres at the 2022 World Athletics U20 Championships in Cali, Colombia, placing sixth overall.

In July 2023, she was part of the Spanish 4 × 400 m relay team which won bronze at the 2023 European Athletics U23 Championships in Espoo, Finland.

Segura was part of the Spanish 4 × 400 m relay team that qualified for the 2024 Paris Olympics at the 2024 World Relays in Nassau, Bahamas.

Segura was selected for the 2024 European Athletics Championships in Rome in June 2024. Her Spanish 4 × 400 m relay team qualified for the final and placed seventh overall. They set a new Spanish national record time 3:25.25, more than two seconds lower than the previous national best. She also reached the semi finals of the individual 400 metres, running a Catalan record time of 51.92 seconds.

On 29 June 2024, she became Spanish champion over 400 metres in La Nucia, running a personal best time of 51.68 seconds. She competed in the women's 4 × 400 metres relay at the 2024 Paris Olympics.

She competed at the 2025 World Athletics Relays in China in the Mixed 4 × 400 metres relay in May 2025.

== Personal life ==
Segura is from Lleida in Catalonia.
