= 2023 European Athletics U23 Championships =

Sports competition in Espoo, Finland

- Organisers: EAA
- Edition: 14th
- Dates: 13–16 July
- Host city: Espoo, Finland
- Venue: Leppävaara Stadium
- Level: Under 23
- Type: Outdoor
- Events: 44
- Participation: 48 nations
- Official website: Espoo 2023

The 2023 European Athletics U23 Championships were the 14th edition of the biennial athletics competition between European athletes under the age of twenty three. The event was organized by European Athletics Association and held from 13–16 July 2023 in Espoo, Finland. This was the third time that Finland staged European Athletics U23 Championships after previous editions Turku 1997 and Tampere 2013.

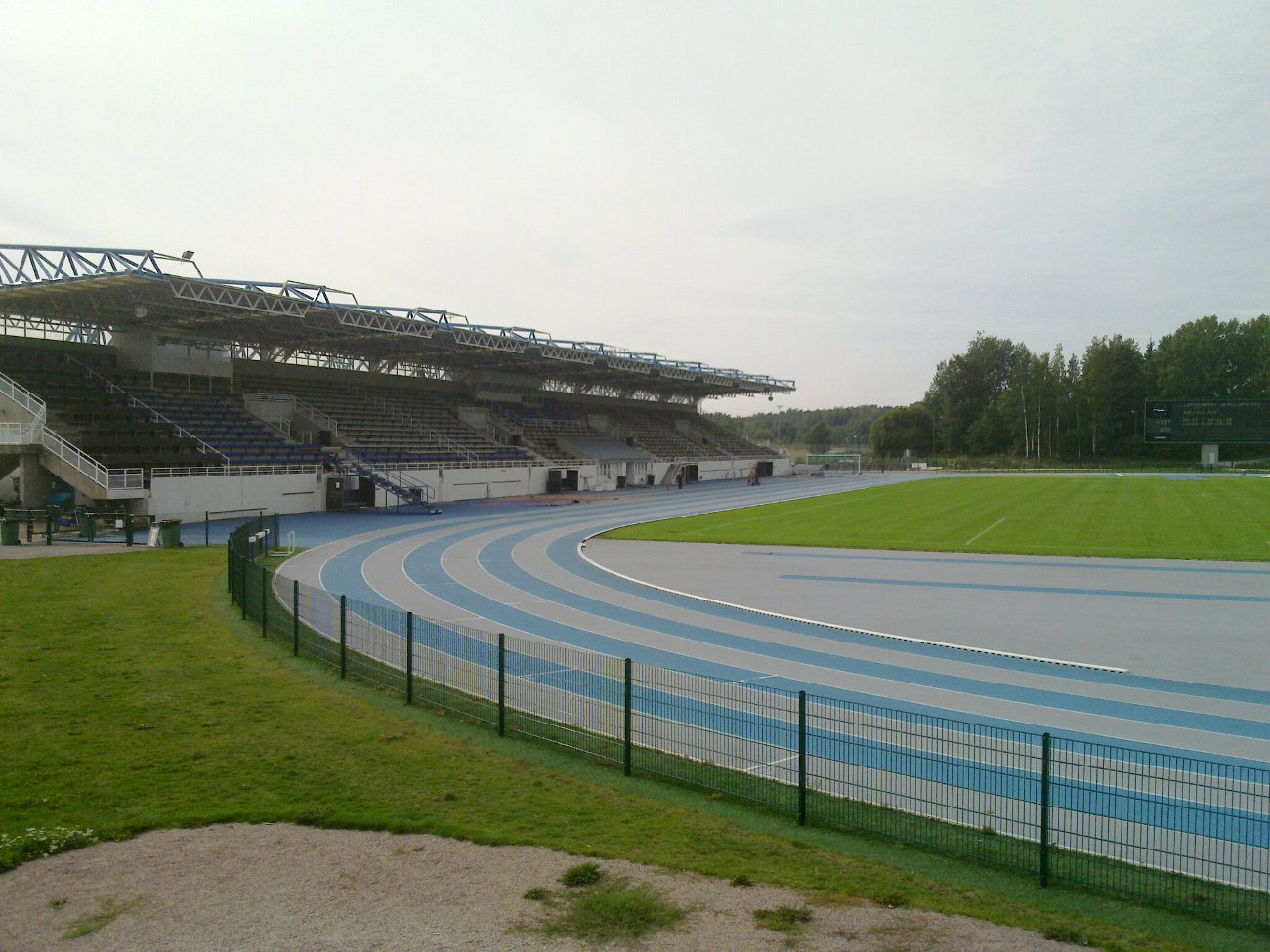
Leppävaara Stadium.

== Medal table ==
* Host nation (Finland)

Rank	Nation	Gold	Silver	Bronze	Total
1	Great Britain (GBR)	7	3	4	14
2	France (FRA)	6	4	5	15
3	Netherlands (NED)	4	3	2	9
4	Spain (ESP)	4	2	5	11
5	Norway (NOR)	4	2	3	9
6	Italy (ITA)	3	6	2	11
7	Finland (FIN)*	3	3	4	10
8	Germany (GER)	2	4	2	8
9	Turkey (TUR)	2	3	1	6
10	Ukraine (UKR)	2	2	0	4
11	Switzerland (SUI)	1	2	3	6
12	Greece (GRE)	1	1	2	4
13	Belgium (BEL)	1	1	0	2
13	Ireland (IRL)	1	1	0	2
13	Lithuania (LTU)	1	1	0	2
16	Cyprus (CYP)	1	0	0	1
16	Israel (ISR)	1	0	0	1
18	Sweden (SWE)	0	3	2	5
19	Hungary (HUN)	0	2	3	5
20	Estonia (EST)	0	1	1	2
21	Portugal (POR)	0	1	0	1
22	Poland (POL)	0	0	2	2
23	Austria (AUT)	0	0	1	1
23	Kosovo (KOS)	0	0	1	1
Totals (24 entries)		44	45	43	132

== Medal summary ==
=== Men ===
Event	Gold		Silver		Bronze	
100 metres	Jeremiah Azu; Great Britain	10.05	Raphael Bouju; Netherlands	10.17	Pablo Mateo; France	10.18
200 metres	Blessing Afrifah; Israel	20.67	Raphael Bouju; Netherlands	20.68	Timothé Mumenthaler; Switzerland	20.85
400 metres	Håvard Bentdal Ingvaldsen; Norway	45.13	Lionel Spitz; Switzerland	45.27 PB	Attila Molnár; Hungary	45.36
800 metres	Yanis Meziane; France	1:45.92	Ethan Hussey; Great Britain	1:45.95	Paul Anselmini; France	1:45.99
1500 metres	Stefan Nillessen; Netherlands	3:43.35	Mohamed Attaoui; Spain	3:43.63	Samuel Pihlström; Sweden	3:43.73
5000 metres	Charles Hicks; Great Britain	13:35.07	Eemil Helander; Finland	13:40.25	Will Barnicoat; Great Britain	13:45.24
10,000 metres	Rory Leonard; Great Britain	29:08.33	Francesco Guerra; Italy	29:11.86	Miguel Baidal; Spain	29:14.91
110 metres hurdles	Sasha Zhoya; France	13.31	Lorenzo Simonelli; Italy	13.36	Erwann Cinna; France	13.47 PB
400 metres hurdles	İsmail Nezir; Turkey	49.19	Berke Akçam; Turkey	49.48 SB	Oskar Edlund; Sweden	49.57 PB
3000 metres steeplechase	Alejandro Quijada; Spain	8:28.91 PB	Etson Barros; Portugal	8:32.08	Baptiste Guyon; France	8:33.64
20 kilometres walk	Paul McGrath; Spain	1:21:03 PB	Andrea Cosi; Italy	1:23:02	Jerry Jokinen; Finland	1:24:41 NU23R
4 × 100 metres relay	Italy; Eric Marek; Matteo Melluzzo; Marco Ricci; Junior Tardioli	38.92 NU23R	France; Jordan Jalce; Hugo Cerra; Mohammed Badru; Pablo Mateo	38.92 SB	Poland; Igor Bogaczyński; Adam Łukomski; Łukasz Żok; Patryk Krupa	39.06
4 × 400 metres relay	Italy; Luca Sito; Riccardo Meli; Francesco Domenico Rossi; Lorenzo Benati	3:02.49 EU23L	Turkey; İlyas Çanakçı; Kubilay Ençü; Berke Akçam; İsmail Nezir	3:03.04 NU23R	Great Britain; Ethan Brown; Brodie Young; Samuel Reardon; Edward Faulds	3:03.12 SB
High jump	Ali Eren Ünlü; Turkey	2.22 m	Oleh Doroshchuk; Ukraine Roman Petruk; Ukraine	2.19 m	No medal awarded	
Pole vault	Juho Alasaari; Finland	5.71 m =NU23R	Robin Emig; France	5.66 m	Pål Haugen Lillefosse; Norway	5.66 m
Long jump	Henrik Flåtnes; Norway	7.96 m PB	Simon Batz; Germany	7.72 m	Mátyás Németh; Hungary	7.71 m
Triple jump	Simon Gore; France	16.40 m SB	Gabriel Wallmark; Sweden	16.24 m SB	Batuhan Çakır; Turkey	16.16 m
Shot put	Tizian Lauria; Germany	19.80 m PB	Eric Maihöfer; Germany	19.44 m SB	Muhamet Ramadani; Kosovo	19.20 m
Discus throw	Mykolas Alekna; Lithuania	68.34 m CR	Marius Karges; Germany Marius Karges; Germany	62.56 m	Yasiel Brayan Sotero Salazar; Spain	61.69 m
Javelin throw	Artur Felfner; Ukraine	83.04 m NU23L	Topias Laine; Finland	79.77 m	Michele Fina; Italy	77.23 m PB
Hammer throw	Mykhaylo Kokhan; Ukraine	77.21 m SB	Merlin Hummel; Germany	75.61 m	Sören Klose; Germany	73.70 m
Decathlon	Markus Rooth; Norway	8608 pts CR, NR	Sander Skotheim; Norway	8561 pts	Sven Roosen; Netherlands	8128 pts
WR world record | AR area record | CR championship record | GR games record | NR national record | OR Olympic record | PB personal best | SB season best | WL world leading (in a given season)

* Indicates the athletes only competed in the preliminary heats and received medals.

=== Women ===
Event	Gold		Silver		Bronze	
100 metres	N'Ketia Seedo; Netherlands	11.22	Boglárka Takács; Hungary	11.30	Mélissa Gutschmidt; Switzerland	11.33
200 metres	Delphine Nkansa; Belgium	23.31	Boglárka Takács; Hungary	23.33	Polyniki Emmanouilidou; Greece	23.41
400 metres	Yemi Mary John; Great Britain	51.04 PB	Henriette Jæger; Norway	51.06 NR	Keely Hodgkinson; Great Britain	51.76 PB
800 metres	Daniela García; Spain	2:02.96	Veera Mattila; Finland	2:03.14 PB	Georgia-Maria Despollari; Greece	2:04.14
1500 metres	Sophie O'Sullivan; Ireland	4:07.18 PB	Sarah Healy; Ireland	4:07.36	Shannon Flockhart; Great Britain	4:08.37 PB
5000 metres	Megan Keith; Great Britain	15:34.33	Maria Forero; Spain	15:43.22	Amina Maatoug; Netherlands	15:50.83
10,000 metres	Alice Goodall; Great Britain	33:16.45	Sara Nestola; Italy	33:17.51	Aurora Bado; Italy	34:12.75
100 metres hurdles	Ditaji Kambundji; Switzerland	12.68 CR	Elena Carraro; Italy	12.97	Anna Tóth; Hungary	12.97
400 metres hurdles	Andrea Rooth; Norway	55.78 EU23L	Louise Maraval; France	55.83 PB	Lena Pressler; Austria	55.94 NR
3000 metres steeplechase	Olivia Gürth; Germany	9:26.98 CR	Greta Karinauskaitė; Lithuania	9:30.96	Marta Serrano; Spain	9:41.47
20 kilometres walk	Pauline Stey; France	1:31:17 NU23R	Alexandrina Mihai; Italy	1:32:32 PB	Camille Moutard; France	1:35:40
4 × 100 metres relay	Great Britain; Cassie-Ann Pemberton; Amy Hunt; Alyson Bell; Aleeya Sibbons	43.04 CR	France; Hillary Godé; Marie-Ange Rimlinger; Gémima Joseph; Paméra Losange	43.39 SB	Switzerland; Nathacha Kouni; Iris Caligiuri; Léonie Pointet; Mélissa Gutschmidt	43.59 NU23R
4 × 400 metres relay	France; Léa Thery-Demarque; Cassandra Delauney-Belleville; Pauline Toriel; Louise Maraval	3:30.60 EU23L	Switzerland; Michelle Gröbli; Lena Wernli; Giulia Senn; Catia Gubelmann	3:30.62 NU23R	Spain; Rocío Arroyo; Berta Segura; Blanca Hervás; Carmen Avilés	3:31.11 NU23R
High jump	Elena Kulichenko; Cyprus	1.91 m	Panagiota Dosi; Greece	1.89 m PB	Wiktoria Miąso; Poland	1.87 m SB
Pole vault	Marie-Julie Bonnin; France	4.50 m =EU23L	Elien Vekemans; Belgium	4.45 m	Kitty Friele Faye; Norway	4.40 m PB
Long jump	Larissa Iapichino; Italy	6.93 m =EL	Maja Åskag; Sweden	6.73 m	Tessy Ebosele; Spain	6.63 m
Triple jump	María Vicente; Spain	14.21 m =EU23L	Maja Åskag; Sweden	13.76 m	Jessica Kähärä; Finland	13.59 m
Shot put	Alida van Daalen; Netherlands	18.32 m EU23L	Serena Vincent; Great Britain	16.93 m PB	Emilia Kangas; Finland	16.75 m
Discus throw	Alida van Daalen; Netherlands	56.77 m	Özlem Becerek; Turkey	55.38 m	Lotta Flatum; Norway	54.45 m
Hammer throw	Silja Kosonen; Finland	73.71 m CR	Charlotte Payne; Great Britain	69.22 m	Aileen Kuhn; Germany	68.30 m
Javelin throw	Elina Tzengko; Greece	60.73 m	Gedly Tugi; Estonia	57.62 m	Anni-Linnea Alanen; Finland	56.67 m
Heptathlon	Saga Vanninen; Finland	6317 pts	Sofie Dokter; Netherlands	6256 pts	Pippi Lotta Enok; Estonia	6002 pts
WR world record | AR area record | CR championship record | GR games record | NR national record | OR Olympic record | PB personal best | SB season best | WL world leading (in a given season)

* Indicates the athletes only competed in the preliminary heats and received medals.

== Entry standards ==
Event	Men	Quota	Women	Rounds
100 metres	10.50	32	11.70	3
200 metres	21.30	32	24.00	3
400 metres	47.00	32	55.00	3
800 metres	1:48.00	24	2:06.50	2
1500 metres	3:42.50	24	4:24.00	2
5000 metres	13:58.00	25	16:35.00	1
10,000 metres / 10 km road	29:45.00	25	35:40.00	1
3000 metres steeplechase	9:00.00	24	10:25.00	2
110/100 metres hurdles	14.40	32	13.20	3
400 metres hurdles	52.50	32	1:00.50	3
High jump	2.15 m (7 ft 1/2 in)	24	1.81 m (5 ft 11 1/4 in)	2
Pole vault	5.20 m (17 ft 1/2 in)	24	4.05 m (13 ft 3 1/4 in)	2
Long jump	7.60 m (24 ft 11 in)	24	6.25 m (20 ft 6 in)	2
Triple jump	15.55 m (51 ft 0 in)	24	12.95 m (42 ft 5 3/4 in)	2
Shot put	17.80 m (58 ft 4 3/4 in)	24	14.50 m (47 ft 6 3/4 in)	2
Discus throw	54.50 m (178 ft 9 1/2 in)	24	49.50 m (162 ft 4 3/4 in)	2
Hammer throw	65.50 m (214 ft 10 1/2 in)	24	61.00 m (200 ft 1 1/2 in)	2
Javelin throw	72.00 m (236 ft 2 1/2 in)	24	51.00 m (167 ft 3 3/4 in)	2
Decathlon/Heptathlon	7400	20	5600	1
20 kilometres race walk	1:35:00	25	1:48:00	1
4 × 100 metres relay		16		2
4 × 400 metres relay		16		2

== Participation ==
1153 athletes from 40 nations are expected to compete at this edition.

- Andorra (2)
- Armenia (2)
- Austria (26)
- Belgium (26)
- Bulgaria (6)
- Croatia (8)
- Cyprus (3)
- Czech Republic (37)
- Denmark (16)
- Estonia (11)
- Finland (74)
- France (85)
- Germany (78)
- Great Britain (49)
- Greece (40)
- Hungary (36)
- Iceland (3)
- Ireland (32)
- Israel (14)
- Italy (83)
- Kosovo (1)
- Latvia (16)
- Lithuania (8)
- Luxembourg (1)
- Malta (3)
- Moldova (2)
- Netherlands (37)
- Norway (51)
- Poland (66)
- Portugal (25)
- Romania (20)
- San Marino (1)
- Serbia (12)
- Slovakia (13)
- Slovenia (18)
- Spain (76)
- Sweden (45)
- Switzerland (49)
- Turkey (41)
- Ukraine (37)
