= 2022 European Athletics Championships – Women's 4 × 100 metres relay =

European sporting event

Women's 4 × 100 metres relay at the 2022 European Athletics Championships
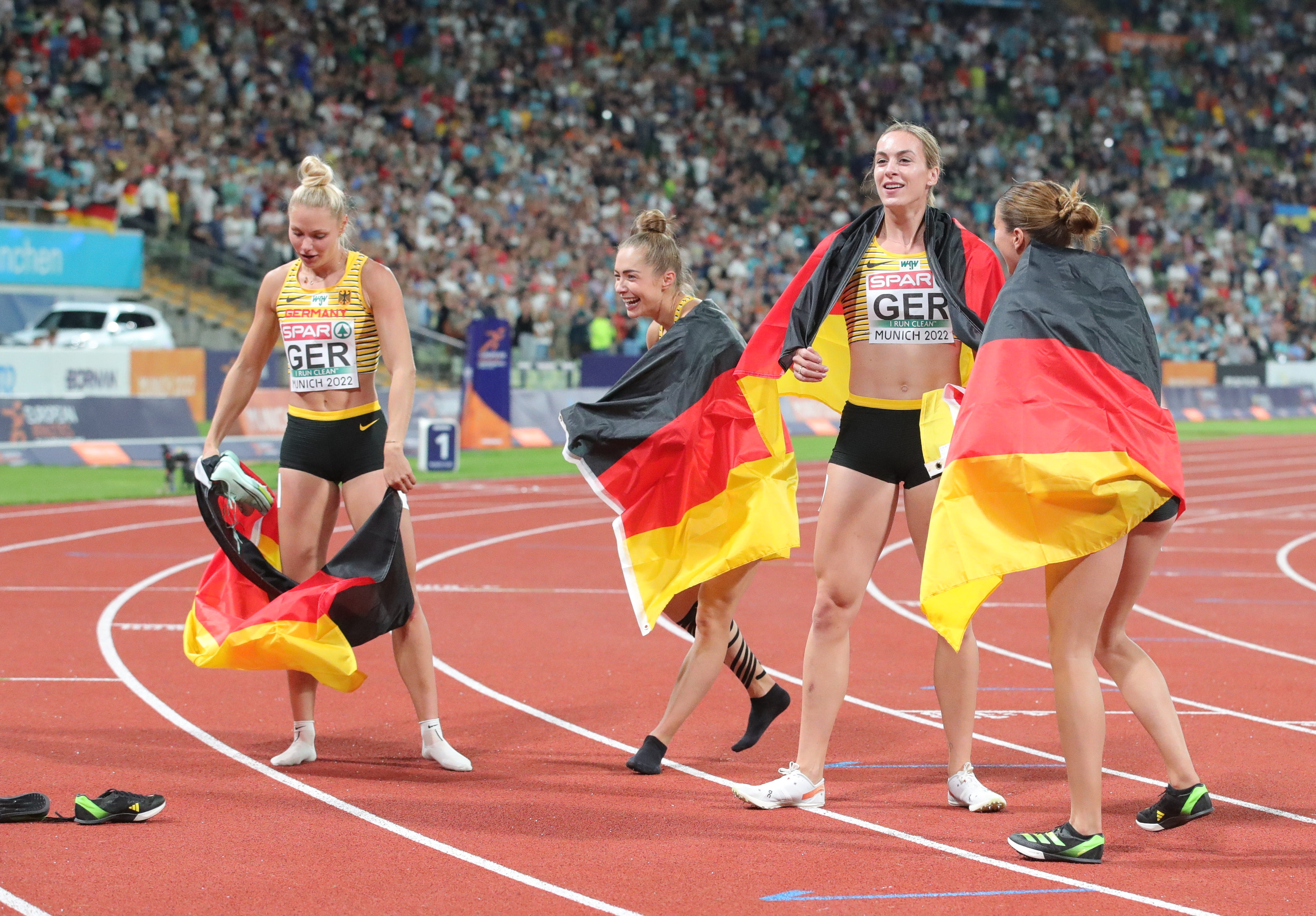
- The German team shortly after winning the final.
- Venue: Olympiastadion
- Location: Munich
- Dates: 19 August (heats); 21 August (final)
- Competitors: 70 from 16 nations
- Winning time: 42.34

Medalists
gold medal	Alexandra Burghardt; Lisa Mayer; Gina Lückenkemper; Rebekka Haase; Jessica-Bianca Wessolly*	Germany
silver medal	Pia Skrzyszowska; Anna Kiełbasińska; Marika Popowicz-Drapała; Ewa Swoboda; Magdalena Stefanowicz*; Martyna Kotwiła*	Poland
bronze medal	Zaynab Dosso; Dalia Kaddari; Anna Bongiorni; Alessia Pavese; Gloria Hooper*	Italy

The women's 4 × 100 metres relay at the 2022 European Athletics Championships took place at the Olympiastadion on 19 and 21 August.

== Records ==
Standing records prior to the 2022 European Athletics Championships
World record	United States; Tianna Madison, Allyson Felix; Bianca Knight, Carmelita Jeter	40.82	London, Great Britain	10 August 2012
European record	East Germany; Silke Gladisch, Sabine Rieger; Ingrid Auerswald, Marlies Göhr	41.37	Canberra, Australia	6 October 1985
Championship record	East Germany; Silke Möller, Katrin Krabbe; Kerstin Behrendt, Sabine Günther	41.68	Split, Yugoslavia	1 September 1990
World Leading	United States; Melissa Jefferson, Abby Steiner; Jenna Prandini, Twanisha Terry	41.14	Eugene, United States	23 July 2022
European Leading	Great Britain; Asha Philip, Imani-Lara Lansiquot; Ashleigh Nelson, Daryll Neita	41.99	Eugene, United States	22 July 2022

== Schedule ==
Date	Time	Round
19 August 2022	10:25	Round 1
21 August 2022	21:22	Final

== Results ==
=== Round 1 ===
First 3 in each heat (Q) and 2 best performers (q) advance to the Final.

Rank	Heat	Lane	Nation	Athletes	Time	Notes
1	1	6	Great Britain	Asha Philip, Imani-Lara Lansiquot, Bianca Williams, Ashleigh Nelson	42.83	Q
2	1	4	Spain	Sonia Molina-Prados, Jaël Bestué, Paula Sevilla, María Isabel Pérez	42.95	Q
3	2	8	France	Floriane Gnafoua, Gémima Joseph, Helene Parisot, Mallory Leconte	43.24	Q, SB
4	1	2	Italy	Zaynab Dosso, Gloria Hooper, Anna Bongiorni, Alessia Pavese	43.28	Q
5	2	4	Germany	Alexandra Burghardt, Lisa Mayer, Jessica-Bianca Wessolly, Rebekka Haase	43.33	Q
6	2	7	Poland	Magdalena Stefanowicz, Martyna Kotwiła, Marika Popowicz-Drapała, Ewa Swoboda	43.49	Q
7	1	7	Belgium	Elise Mehuys, Delphine Nkansa, Rani Vincke, Rani Rosius	43.58	q, SB
8	2	2	Netherlands	N'Ketia Seedo, Zoë Sedney, Minke Bisschops, Naomi Sedney	43.75	q
9	2	1	Switzerland	Géraldine Frey, Ajla del Ponte, Salomé Kora, Melissa Gutschmidt	43.93	
10	1	8	Sweden	Julia Henriksson, Daniella Busk, Filippa Sivnert, Elvira Tanderud	44.10	
11	2	6	Hungary	Anna Luca Kocsis, Jusztina Csóti, Boglárka Takács, Anna Tóth	44.19	SB
12	1	5	Denmark	Mette Graversgaard, Mathilde Kramer, Emma Beiter Bomme, Astrid Glenner-Frandsen	44.20	
13	1	1	Greece	Styliani-Alexandra Michailidou, Elisavet Pesiridou, Artemis Melina Anastasiou, Rafailía Spanoudaki-Hatziriga	44.58	
14	2	3	Finland	Johanna Kylmänen, Aino Pulkkinen, Anniina Kortetmaa, Anna Pursiainen	44.73	
	2	5	Czech Republic	Eva Kubíčková, Tereza Lamačová, Natálie Kožuškaničová, Johana Kaiserová	DNF	
	1	3	Austria	Viktoria Willhuber, Susanne Walli, Magdalena Lindner, Lena Pressler	DQ	TR24.7

=== Final ===
Rank	Lane	Nation	Athletes	Time	Notes
1st place, gold medalist(s)	3	Germany	Alexandra Burghardt, Lisa Mayer, Gina Lückenkemper, Rebekka Haase	42.34	
2nd place, silver medalist(s)	8	Poland	Pia Skrzyszowska, Anna Kiełbasińska, Marika Popowicz-Drapała, Ewa Swoboda	42.61	NR
3rd place, bronze medalist(s)	7	Italy	Zaynab Dosso, Dalia Kaddari, Anna Bongiorni, Alessia Pavese	42.84	
4	6	Spain	Sonia Molina-Prados, Jaël Bestué, Paula Sevilla, María Isabel Pérez	43.03	
5	1	Netherlands	N'Ketia Seedo, Zoë Sedney, Jamile Samuel, Naomi Sedney	43.03	SB
6	2	Belgium	Elise Mehuys, Delphine Nkansa, Rani Vincke, Rani Rosius	43.98	
	5	France	Floriane Gnafoua, Gémima Joseph, Helene Parisot, Mallory Leconte	DNF	
	4	Great Britain	Asha Philip, Imani-Lara Lansiquot, Ashleigh Nelson, Dina Asher-Smith	DNF	

In the final, two teams, Great Britain and France, failed to finish, after failing to complete the first baton exchange within the zone.
