= 2023 Weltklasse Zürich =

Outdoor track and field meeting in Zürich, Switzerland

- Dates: 31 August 2023 (pole vault held on 30 August)
- Host city: Zürich, Switzerland
- Venue: Letzigrund
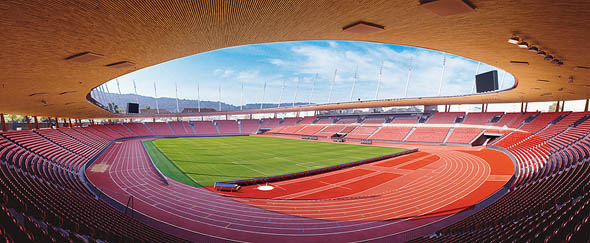
- Level: 2023 Diamond League

The 2023 Weltklasse Zürich was an outdoor track and field meeting in Zürich, Switzerland. Held on 31 August 2023 at the Letzigrund, it was the eleventh leg of the 2023 Diamond League – the highest level international track and field circuit.

The women's pole vault was held one day before the rest of the competition, on 30 August.

The meeting was highlighted by sprint victories from Sha'Carri Richardson and Noah Lyles, while Karsten Warholm lost his first Diamond League race in five years.

== Results ==
Athletes competing in the Diamond League disciplines earned extra compensation and points which went towards qualifying for the 2023 Diamond League finals. First place earned 8 points, with each step down in place earning one less point than the previous, until no points are awarded in 9th place or lower.

=== Diamond Discipline ===
Women's Pole Vault
Place	Athlete	Country	Mark	Points
1st place, gold medalist(s)	Nina Kennedy	Australia	4.91 m	8
2nd place, silver medalist(s)	Katie Moon	United States	4.81 m	7
3rd place, bronze medalist(s)	Sandi Morris	United States	4.76 m	6
4	Angelica Moser	Switzerland	4.66 m	5
5	Molly Caudery	Great Britain	4.66 m	4
6	Elisa Molinarolo	Italy	4.51 m	3
7	Tina Šutej	Slovenia	4.51 m	2
8	Amálie Švábíková	Czech Republic	4.51 m	1
	Margot Chevrier	France	NM	
	Wilma Murto	Finland	NM	

Men's 200m (−0.5 m/s)
Place	Athlete	Country	Time	Points
1st place, gold medalist(s)	Noah Lyles	United States	19.80	8
2nd place, silver medalist(s)	Erriyon Knighton	United States	19.87	7
3rd place, bronze medalist(s)	Zharnel Hughes	Great Britain	19.94	6
4	Kenny Bednarek	United States	19.98	5
5	Andre De Grasse	Canada	20.26	4
6	Aaron Brown	Canada	20.39	3
7	Joshua Hartmann	Germany	20.43	2
8	William Reais	Switzerland	20.66	1

Men's 1500m
Place	Athlete	Country	Time	Points
1st place, gold medalist(s)	Yared Nuguse	United States	3:30.49	8
2nd place, silver medalist(s)	Josh Kerr	Great Britain	3:30.51	7
3rd place, bronze medalist(s)	Abel Kipsang	Kenya	3:30.85	6
4	George Mills	Great Britain	3:30.95	5
5	Azeddine Habz	France	3:31.36	4
6	Niels Laros	Netherlands	3:31.63	3
7	Stewart McSweyn	Australia	3:31.92	2
8	Reynold Cheruiyot	Kenya	3:31.97	1
9	Cole Hocker	United States	3:32.00	
10	Mario García	Spain	3:32.12	
11	Sam Tanner	New Zealand	3:32.16	
12	Tom Elmer	Switzerland	3:35.03	
13	Mohamed Katir	Spain	3:40.11	
14	Andrew Coscoran	Ireland	3:47.25	
	Matthew Ramsden	Australia	DNF	
	Patryk Sieradzki	Poland	DNF	

Men's 5000m
Place	Athlete	Country	Time	Points
1st place, gold medalist(s)	Yomif Kejelcha	Ethiopia	12:46.91	8
2nd place, silver medalist(s)	Selemon Barega	Ethiopia	12:54.17	7
3rd place, bronze medalist(s)	Grant Fisher	United States	12:54.49	6
4	Luis Grijalva	Guatemala	12:55.88	5
5	Dominic Lokinyomo Lobalu	South Sudan	13:07.02	4
6	Brian Fay	Ireland	13:24.61	3
7	Jonas Raess	Switzerland	13:27.13	2
8	Etienne Daguinos	France	13:29.23	1
9	Henrik Ingebrigtsen	Norway	13:38.86	
	Woody Kincaid	United States	DNF	
	Kyumbe Munguti	Kenya	DNF	
	Lamecha Girma	Ethiopia	DNF	
	Mounir Akbache	France	DNF	
	Mohamed Abdilaahi	Germany	DNF	
	Mike Foppen	Netherlands	DNF	
	Andreas Almgren	Sweden	DNF	

Men's 400mH
Place	Athlete	Country	Time	Points
1st place, gold medalist(s)	Kyron McMaster	British Virgin Islands	47.27	8
2nd place, silver medalist(s)	Karsten Warholm	Norway	47.30	7
3rd place, bronze medalist(s)	Alison dos Santos	Brazil	47.62	6
4	CJ Allen	United States	48.28	5
5	Wilfried Happio	France	48.42	4
6	Trevor Bassitt	United States	49.39	3
7	Julien Bonvin	Switzerland	50.34	2
	Roshawn Clarke	Jamaica	DNF	

Men's High Jump
Place	Athlete	Country	Mark	Points
1st place, gold medalist(s)	Mutaz Barsham	Qatar	2.35 m	8
2nd place, silver medalist(s)	Hamish Kerr	New Zealand	2.33 m	7
3rd place, bronze medalist(s)	Woo Sang-hyeok	South Korea	2.31 m	6
4	Gianmarco Tamberi	Italy	2.28 m	5
5	Ryōichi Akamatsu	Japan	2.24 m	4
6	Shelby McEwen	United States	2.24 m	3
7	Loïc Gasch	Switzerland	2.24 m	2
8	Luis Zayas	Cuba	2.24 m	1
9	Tobias Potye	Germany	2.20 m	
10	Brandon Starc	Australia	2.20 m	

Men's Pole Vault
Place	Athlete	Country	Mark	Points
1st place, gold medalist(s)	Armand Duplantis	Sweden	6.00 m	8
2nd place, silver medalist(s)	Sam Kendricks	United States	5.95 m	7
3rd place, bronze medalist(s)	KC Lightfoot	United States	5.85 m	6
4	Thibaut Collet	France	5.85 m	5
5	Kurtis Marschall	Australia	5.85 m	4
6	Ersu Şaşma	Turkey	5.75 m	3
7	Chris Nilsen	United States	5.75 m	2
8	Ben Broeders	Belgium	5.75 m	1
9	Zach McWhorter	United States	5.75 m	
10	EJ Obiena	Philippines	5.60 m	

Men's Long Jump
Place	Athlete	Country	Mark	Points
1st place, gold medalist(s)	Miltiadis Tentoglou	Greece	8.20 m (−0.5 m/s)	8
2nd place, silver medalist(s)	Tajay Gayle	Jamaica	8.07 m (−0.5 m/s)	7
3rd place, bronze medalist(s)	Jarrion Lawson	United States	8.05 m (−0.7 m/s)	6
4	Radek Juška	Czech Republic	8.04 m (−0.7 m/s)	5
5	Murali Sreeshankar	India	7.99 m (−0.4 m/s)	4
6	Simon Ehammer	Switzerland	7.97 m (−0.6 m/s)	3
7	Chris Mitrevski	Australia	7.81 m (−0.2 m/s)	2
8	Will Williams	United States	7.81 m (−0.3 m/s)	1
9	Carey McLeod	Jamaica	7.60 m (−0.7 m/s)	
10	Mattia Furlani	Italy	7.53 m (−0.7 m/s)	

Men's Javelin Throw
Place	Athlete	Country	Mark	Points
1st place, gold medalist(s)	Jakub Vadlejch	Czech Republic	85.86 m	8
2nd place, silver medalist(s)	Neeraj Chopra	India	85.71 m	7
3rd place, bronze medalist(s)	Julian Weber	Germany	85.04 m	6
4	Oliver Helander	Finland	83.65 m	5
5	Edis Matusevičius	Lithuania	81.62 m	4
6	Anderson Peters	Grenada	81.01 m	3
7	Genki Dean	Japan	79.93 m	2
8	Andrian Mardare	Moldova	79.13 m	1
9	Dawid Wegner	Poland	77.66 m	
10	Timothy Herman	Belgium	76.24 m	

Women's 100m (−0.2 m/s)
Place	Athlete	Country	Time	Points
1st place, gold medalist(s)	Sha'Carri Richardson	United States	10.88	8
2nd place, silver medalist(s)	Natasha Morrison	Jamaica	11.00	7
3rd place, bronze medalist(s)	Elaine Thompson-Herah	Jamaica	11.00	6
4	Mujinga Kambundji	Switzerland	11.08	5
5	Shashalee Forbes	Jamaica	11.12	4
6	Twanisha Terry	United States	11.13	3
7	Zoe Hobbs	New Zealand	11.14	2
8	Tamara Clark	United States	11.23	1
9	Anthonique Strachan	Bahamas	11.39	

Women's 200m (−0.8 m/s)
Place	Athlete	Country	Time	Points
1st place, gold medalist(s)	Shericka Jackson	Jamaica	21.82	8
2nd place, silver medalist(s)	Daryll Neita	Great Britain	22.25	7
3rd place, bronze medalist(s)	Kayla White	United States	22.33	6
4	Mujinga Kambundji	Switzerland	22.46	5
5	Twanisha Terry	United States	22.57	4
6	Anthonique Strachan	Bahamas	22.65	3
7	Jenna Prandini	United States	22.78	2
8	Tamara Clark	United States	22.94	1

Women's 800m
Place	Athlete	Country	Time	Points
1st place, gold medalist(s)	Laura Muir	Great Britain	1:57.71	8
2nd place, silver medalist(s)	Catriona Bisset	Australia	1:58.77	7
3rd place, bronze medalist(s)	Adelle Tracey	Jamaica	1:59.05	6
4	Nia Akins	United States	1:59.29	5
5	Rénelle Lamote	France	1:59.33	4
6	Raevyn Rogers	United States	1:59.35	3
7	Audrey Werro	Switzerland	1:59.50	2
8	Lore Hoffmann	Switzerland	2:00.09	1
9	Natoya Goule-Toppin	Jamaica	2:00.10	
10	Sage Hurta-Klecker	United States	2:00.51	
11	Halimah Nakaayi	Uganda	2:01.25	
	Ellie Sanford	Australia	DNF	

Women's 100mH (−0.2 m/s)
Place	Athlete	Country	Time	Points
1st place, gold medalist(s)	Danielle Williams	Jamaica	12.54	8
2nd place, silver medalist(s)	Alaysha Johnson	United States	12.58	7
3rd place, bronze medalist(s)	Kendra Harrison	United States	12.59	6
4	Tia Jones	United States	12.62	5
5	Megan Tapper	Jamaica	12.64	4
6	Ditaji Kambundji	Switzerland	12.73	3
7	Nia Ali	United States	12.75	2
8	Devynne Charlton	Bahamas	12.75	1
9	Pia Skrzyszowska	Poland	13.10	

Women's 3000mSC
Place	Athlete	Country	Time	Points
1st place, gold medalist(s)	Winfred Yavi	Bahrain	9:03.19	8
2nd place, silver medalist(s)	Beatrice Chepkoech	Kenya	9:03.70	7
3rd place, bronze medalist(s)	Faith Cherotich	Kenya	9:07.59	6
4	Luiza Gega	Albania	9:09.64	5
5	Marwa Bouzayani	Tunisia	9:11.98	4
6	Lomi Muleta	Ethiopia	9:14.66	2
7	Olivia Gürth	Germany	9:21.82	1
8	Alicja Konieczek	Poland	9:21.89	
9	Peruth Chemutai	Uganda	9:23.79	
10	Courtney Wayment	United States	9:24.77	
11	Jackline Chepkoech	Kenya	9:27.29	
12	Tuğba Güvenç	Turkey	9:33.23	
	Zerfe Wondemagegn	Ethiopia	~~9:13.73~~	DSQ
	Fancy Cherono	Kenya	DNF	

Women's Triple Jump
Place	Athlete	Country	Mark	Points
1st place, gold medalist(s)	Yulimar Rojas	Venezuela	15.15 m (+0.2 m/s)	8
2nd place, silver medalist(s)	Shanieka Ricketts	Jamaica	14.78 m (+0.6 m/s)	7
3rd place, bronze medalist(s)	Liadagmis Povea	Cuba	14.73 m (+0.2 m/s)	6
4	Leyanis Pérez	Cuba	14.62 m (+0.5 m/s)	5
5	Thea LaFond	Dominica	14.42 m (+0.4 m/s)	4
6	Maryna Bekh-Romanchuk	Ukraine	14.37 m (−0.2 m/s)	3
7	Dariya Derkach	Italy	14.18 m (+0.3 m/s)	2
8	Ottavia Cestonaro	Italy	14.11 m (+0.2 m/s)	1
9	Kimberly Williams	Jamaica	13.75 m (±0.0 m/s)	
10	Keturah Orji	United States	13.55 m (+0.3 m/s)	

=== Promotional events ===
Men's 400m
Place	Athlete	Country	Time
1st place, gold medalist(s)	Håvard Bentdal Ingvaldsen	Norway	45.28
2nd place, silver medalist(s)	Davide Re	Italy	45.49
3rd place, bronze medalist(s)	Dylan Borlée	Belgium	45.67
4	Lionel Spitz	Switzerland	45.83
5	Liemarvin Bonevacia	Netherlands	46.25
6	Ricky Petrucciani	Switzerland	46.66
7	Joe Brier	Great Britain	46.82
8	Dany Brand	Switzerland	46.83

Men's 110mH (−0.1 m/s)
Place	Athlete	Country	Time
1st place, gold medalist(s)	Jason Joseph	Switzerland	13.08
2nd place, silver medalist(s)	Enrique Llopis	Spain	13.31
3rd place, bronze medalist(s)	Eric Edwards Jr.	United States	13.45
4	David King	Great Britain	13.60
5	Lorenzo Simonelli	Italy	13.60
6	Damian Czykier	Poland	13.64
7	Craig Thorne	Canada	13.70
8	Finley Gaio	Switzerland	13.77

Women's 100m
Place	Athlete	Country	Time	Heat
1st place, gold medalist(s)	Géraldine Frey	Switzerland	11.25	1
2nd place, silver medalist(s)	Lorène Bazolo	Portugal	11.35	1
3rd place, bronze medalist(s)	Mélissa Gutschmidt	Switzerland	11.39	1
4	N'Ketia Seedo	Netherlands	11.42	1
5	Salomé Kora	Switzerland	11.42	1
6	Bree Masters	Australia	11.43	1
7	Arialis Gandulla	Portugal	11.45	1
8	Marije van Hunenstijn	Netherlands	11.49	1
9	Torrie Lewis	Australia	11.56	1
10	Isabel Posch	Austria	11.57	2
11	Line Kloster	Norway	11.58	2
12	Magdalena Lindner	Austria	11.79	2
13	Céline Bürgi	Switzerland	11.82	2
14	Pirkitta Marjanen	Finland	11.91	2
15	Lena Weiss	Switzerland	11.93	2
16	Christine Bjelland Jensen	Norway	11.95	2
17	Soraya Becerra	Switzerland	12.03	2

Women's 400m
Place	Athlete	Country	Time
1st place, gold medalist(s)	Shaunae Miller-Uibo	Bahamas	51.83
2nd place, silver medalist(s)	Annina Fahr	Switzerland	51.97
3rd place, bronze medalist(s)	Julia Niederberger	Switzerland	52.11
4	Lisanne de Witte	Netherlands	52.23
5	Giulia Senn	Switzerland	52.28
6	Eveline Saalberg	Netherlands	52.32
7	Alica Schmidt	Germany	52.43
8	Emily Newnham	Great Britain	52.59

Women's 4 × 100 m
Place	Athlete	Country	Time
1st place, gold medalist(s)	N'Ketia Seedo; Marije van Hunenstijn; Jamile Samuel; Tasa Jiya	Netherlands	42.86
2nd place, silver medalist(s)	Nathacha Kouni; Salomé Kora; Géraldine Frey; Mélissa Gutschmidt	Switzerland	42.94
3rd place, bronze medalist(s)	Ebony Lane; Bree Masters; Kristie Edwards; Torrie Lewis	Australia	43.21
4	Anna Pursiainen; Aino Pulkkinen; Anniina Kortetmaa; Lotta Kemppinen	Finland	44.23
5	Lena Weiss; Iris Caligiuri; Léonie Pointet; Céline Bürgi	Switzerland	44.37
6	Vilde Aasmo; Christine Bjelland Jensen; Marte Pettersen; Line Kloster	Norway	44.66
7	Beatriz Andrade; Lorène Bazolo; Olimpia Barbosa; Arialis Gandulla	Portugal	44.88
8	Isabel Posch; Magdalena Lindner; Lena Pressler; Chiara-Belinda Schuler	Austria	45.12

=== U18 events ===
Men's 1000m
Place	Athlete	Country	Time
1st place, gold medalist(s)	Noah Collioud	Switzerland	2:26.88
2nd place, silver medalist(s)	Jeremy Gasser	Switzerland	2:28.89
3rd place, bronze medalist(s)	Taino Kohler	Switzerland	2:29.38
4	Lenny Dessimoz	Switzerland	2:29.41
5	Philip Jonsson	Sweden	2:30.14
6	Yoan Baumgartner	Switzerland	2:30.88
7	Levin Hermida	Switzerland	2:31.45
8	Lino Baumgartner	Switzerland	2:31.59
9	Petter Oster	Switzerland	2:33.36
10	Lukas Zisler	Switzerland	2:36.36
11	Mailo Weis	Switzerland	2:36.92
12	Alessandro Ferro Luzzi	Switzerland	2:37.47
13	Loris Knuchel	Switzerland	2:37.77
14	Valentin Nietlisbach	Switzerland	2:37.89
	Théo Mex	Switzerland	DNF

Women's 1000m
Place	Athlete	Country	Time
1st place, gold medalist(s)	Aimie Decrausaz	Switzerland	2:42.53
2nd place, silver medalist(s)	Fiona von Flüe	Switzerland	2:48.79
3rd place, bronze medalist(s)	Livia Casagrande	Switzerland	2:50.86
4	Emelie Jonsson	Sweden	2:52.45
5	Leonie Steffen	Switzerland	2:52.89
6	Lena Koné	Switzerland	2:52.91
7	Tiziana Rosamilia	Switzerland	2:54.28
8	Fanny Ruffieux	Switzerland	2:54.64
9	Elena Etter	Switzerland	2:55.07
10	Livia Walde	Switzerland	2:55.34
11	Elora Gurnham	Switzerland	2:55.37
12	Nina Casagrande	Switzerland	2:56.24
13	Alisha Schafroth	Switzerland	2:56.76
14	Mina Hirsbrunner	Switzerland	2:58.97
15	Eva Kladoumbaye	Switzerland	2:59.67
16	Seline Büchel	Switzerland	2:59.78
17	Noée Wipfli	Switzerland	3:00.07
18	Cassandra Gouttefarde	Switzerland	3:00.34
19	Amaja Rahm	Switzerland	3:00.61
20	Lynn Grossmann	Switzerland	3:00.83
21	Mira Knuchel	Switzerland	3:05.21

== See also ==
- 2023 Diamond League
