= 2024 European Athletics Championships – Women's 4 × 100 metres relay =

Women's 4 × 100 metres relay at the 2024 European Athletics Championships
- Venue: Stadio Olimpico
- Location: Rome
- Dates: 11 June (heats); 12 June (final)
- Winning time: 41.91 EL

Medalists
gold medal	Dina Asher-Smith; Desiree Henry; Amy Hunt; Daryll Neita; Asha Philip*	Great Britain
silver medal	Orlann Oliere; Gémima Joseph; Helene Parisot; Sarah Richard; Maroussia Paré*	France
bronze medal	Nadine Visser; Marije van Hunenstijn; Minke Bisschops; Tasa Jiya	Netherlands

The women's 4 × 100 metres relay at the 2024 European Athletics Championships took place at the Stadio Olimpico on 11 and 12 June.

== Records ==
Standing records prior to the 2024 European Athletics Championships
World record	United States Tianna Madison, Allyson Felix, Bianca Knight, Carmelita Jeter	40.82	London, Great Britain	10 August 2012
European record	East Germany Silke Gladisch, Sabine Rieger, Ingrid Auerswald, Marlies Göhr	41.37	Canberra, Australia	6 October 1985
Championship record	East Germany Silke Möller, Katrin Krabbe, Kerstin Behrendt, Sabine Günther	41.68	Split, Yugoslavia	1 September 1990
World Leading	United States Tamari Davis, Gabrielle Thomas, Celera Barnes, Melissa Jefferson	41.85	Nassau, Bahamas	5 May 2024
Europe Leading	Great Britain Asha Philip, Imani-Lara Lansiquot, Bianca Williams, Amy Hunt	42.33	Nassau, Bahamas	4 May 2024

== Schedule ==
Date	Time	Round
11 June 2024	12:30	Round 1
12 June 2024	22:38	Final

All times are local times (UTC+2)

== Results ==
=== Round 1 ===
Qualification: First 3 in each heat (Q) and the next 2 fastest (q) advance to the final.

Rank	Heat	Lane	Nation	Athletes	Time	Notes
1	1	2	Great Britain	Asha Philip, Amy Hunt, Dina Asher-Smith, Desiree Henry	42.25	Q, EL
2	2	8	France	Orlann Oliere, Gémima Joseph, Maroussia Paré, Sarah Richard	42.35	Q, SB
3	2	2	Netherlands	Nadine Visser, Marije van Hunenstijn, Minke Bisschops, Tasa Jiya	42.39	Q, SB
4	2	3	Germany	Sophia Junk, Nele Jaworski, Gina Lückenkemper, Rebekka Haase	42.47	Q, SB
5	1	3	Switzerland	Géraldine Frey, Salomé Kora, Léonie Pointet, Sara Atcho-Jaquier	42.76	Q
6	2	9	Belgium	Rani Vincke, Rani Rosius, Elise Mehuys, Delphine Nkansa	42.85	q, SB
7	1	4	Spain	Sonia Molina-Prados, Esther Navero, Paula Sevilla, Maria Isabel Pérez	43.00	Q
8	2	5	Poland	Krystsina Tsimanouskaya, Monika Romaszko, Magdalena Stefanowicz, Ewa Swoboda	43.15	q
9	1	5	Italy	Irene Siragusa, Dalia Kaddari, Anna Bongiorni, Arianna de Masi	43.27	
10	2	4	Finland	Petra Häggqvist, Anna Pursiainen, Anniinna Kortetmaa, Lotta Kemppinen	43.68	SB
11	1	6	Hungary	Jusztina Csóti, Anna Luca Kocsis, Gréta Kerekes, Alexa Sulyán	43.70	
12	1	7	Austria	Isabel Posch, Magdalena Lindner, Karin Strametz, Viktoria Willhuber	43.84	NR
13	2	6	Portugal	Lorène Bazolo, Rosalina Santos, Lurdes Oliveira, Íris Silva	43.85	NR
14	2	7	Denmark	Astrid Glenner-Frandsen, Mathilde Kramer, Mette Graversgaard, Klara Skriver Loessl	44.21	SB
15	1	8	Greece	Styliani-Alexandera Michailidou, Elisavet Pesiridou, Rafailia Spanoudaki-Chatziriga, Artemis Melina Anastasiou	44.23	
16	1	9	Estonia	Mila Ott, Ann Marii Kivikas, Kreete Verlin, Diana Suumann	53.37	

=== Final ===
The final started on 12 June at 22:40.

Rank	Lane	Nation	Athletes	Time	Notes
1st place, gold medalist(s)	6	Great Britain	Dina Asher-Smith, Desiree Henry, Amy Hunt, Daryll Neita	41.91	EL
2nd place, silver medalist(s)	5	France	Orlann Oliere, Gémima Joseph, Helene Parisot, Sarah Richard	42.15	SB
3rd place, bronze medalist(s)	7	Netherlands	Nadine Visser, Marije van Hunenstijn, Minke Bisschops, Tasa Jiya	42.46	
4	4	Germany	Sophia Junk, Lisa Mayer, Gina Lückenkemper, Rebekka Haase	42.61	
5	9	Spain	Sonia Molina-Prados, Jaël Bestué, Paula Sevilla, Maria Isabel Pérez	42.84	SB
6	2	Belgium	Rani Vincke, Rani Rosius, Elise Mehuys, Janie de Naeyer	43.48	
	3	Poland	Krystsina Tsimanouskaya, Monika Romaszko, Magdalena Stefanowicz, Ewa Swoboda	DNF	
	8	Switzerland	Géraldine Frey, Salomé Kora, Léonie Pointet, Sara Atcho-Jaquier	DQ	TR24.5(B)
