= Minke Bisschops =

Dutch sprinter

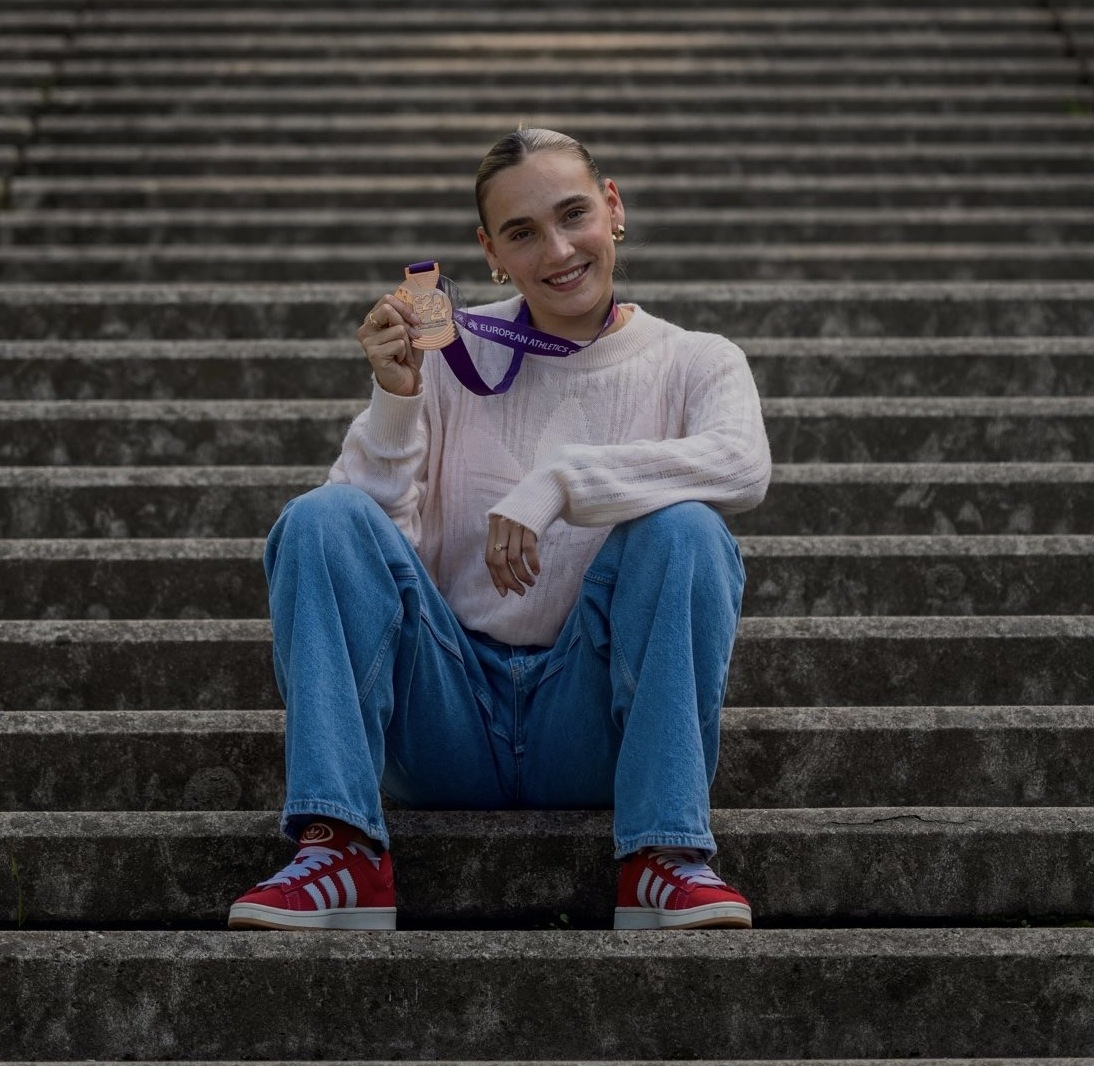
- Bisschops with her bronze relay medal from the 2024 European Championships

Personal information
- Born: 2 September 2002 (age 23)
- Height: 1.68 m (5 ft 6 in)

Sport
- Country: Netherlands
- Sport: Track and field
Medal record
Women's athletics
Representing Netherlands
European Championships
Bronze medal – third place	2024 Rome	4×100 m relay
European U20 Championships
Silver medal – second place	2019 Borås	4×100 m relay
Silver medal – second place	2021 Tallinn	200 m
European Youth Olympic Festival
Gold medal – first place	2017 Győr	100 m
Silver medal – second place	2017 Győr	4×100 m relay

Minke Bisschops (pronounced [ˈmɪŋkə ˈbɪsxɔps]; born 2 September 2002) is a Dutch track and field athlete who competes as a sprinter. Her personal best in the 100 metres is 11.05 s and in the 200 metres 22.39 s, both ran in 2025. She holds the Dutch record in the 4 x 100 metres relay of 42.02 s with the Dutch women's team. She won a bronze in the women's 4 x 100 metres relay at the 2024 European Athletics Championships.

== Early life ==
Minke Bisschops was born on 2 September 2002 in Landgraaf, Netherlands.

== Career ==
Bisschops represents the Netherlands at international competitions. She ran a personal best time of 11.35 for the 100 metres in the heats of the 2021 European Athletics U20 Championships in Tallinn, Estonia in August 2021, to move to second on the Dutch U20 all-time list at the distance behind only Dafne Schippers. At that championships Bisschops won the silver medal in the 200 metres.

She competed at the 2022 World Athletics Championships in the 4 × 100 metres relay event in Eugene, Oregon. She also competed at the 2022 European Athletics Championships in Munich.

She ran as part of the Dutch 4 × 100 m relay team which qualified for the 2024 Paris Olympics at the 2024 World Relays Championships in Nassau, Bahamas. In June 2024, she won a bronze medal at the 2024 European Athletics Championships in Rome, as part of the Dutch team in the 4 x 100 metres relay, alongside Nadine Visser, Marije van Hunenstijn, and Tasa Jiya.

On 8 August 2024, she ran as part of the Dutch 4 × 100 m relay team at the 2024 Paris Olympics which qualified for the final.

She won the Dutch national indoor 60 metres title in February 2025. She was selected for the 2025 European Athletics Indoor Championships in Apeldoorn, where she ran a personal best 7.17 seconds for the 60 metres in the semi-final. She competed at the 2025 World Athletics Relays in China in the Women's 4 × 100 metres relay in May 2025. She ran a personal best 11.21 seconds for the 100 metres in Hengelo on 9 June 2025. Later that month, she ran a new personal best of 11.17 seconds in the 100 metres at the 2025 European Athletics Team Championships in Madrid. At the championships she also ran alongside Lieke Klaver, Nadine Visser and Marije van Hunenstijn as part of the Dutch winning 4 x 100 metres team which set a new national record time. She was selected for the Dutch team for the 2025 World Athletics Championships in Tokyo, Japan, but was unable to compete due to injury.

Bisschops lowered her personal best for the 60 metres to 7.16 seconds competing in Apeldoorn in January 2026, and then to 7.11 seconds in Metz on 8 February. Later that month, she ran 7.17 seconds to win the 60 metres at the Dutch Indoor Athletics Championships. She competed with the Dutch squad at the 2026 World Athletics Relays in Gaborone, Botswana. On 7 June, she placed fourth in 11.08 seconds in the 100 metres at the Diamond League event in Stockholm, and 3 days later placed fourth over 100 metres at the 2026 Bislett Games. She was unable to competed for the Netherlands at the 2026 European Championships due to injury.

== Personal bests ==
Information based on Bisschops' World Athletics profile.

Personal best results of individual events
Event	Result	Location	Date	Notes
60 metres	7.11 s i	Metz, France	8 February 2026	
100 metres	10.89 s w	Vari, Greece	5 July 2025	Wind assisted: +3.2 m/s
100 metres	11.05 s	Hengelo, Netherlands	2 August 2025	(Wind: +1.0 m/s)
150 metres	17.39 s	Lisse, Netherlands	11 May 2024	(Wind: −0.4 m/s)
200 metres	22.39 s	Vari, Greece	5 July 2025	(Wind: +1.1 m/s)
200 metres short track	23.47 s i	Metz, France	8 February 2025	
300 metres	39.16 s	Lisse, Netherlands	11 May 2024	
400 metres	56.97 s	Eindhoven, Netherlands	1 May 2022	
Long jump	5.84 m	Assendelft, Netherlands	11 September 2022	(Wind: 0.0 m/s)

Personal best results of team events
Type	Event	Result	Location	Date	Record	Notes
Women's	4 × 100 metres relay	42.02 s	Madrid, Spain	28 June 2025	NR	Teamed with Nadine Visser, Lieke Klaver, and Marije van Hunenstijn.
Mixed	4 × 100 metres relay	40.20 s	Gaborone, Botswana	2 May 2026	NR	Teamed with Nsikak Ekpo, Xavi Mo-Ajok, and Isabel van den Berg

== Competition results ==
Information based on Bisschops' World Athletics profile.

=== International championships ===
Achievements in international championships representing the Netherlands
Year	Competition	Location	Position	Event	Time	Notes
2017	European Youth Olympic Festival	Győr, Hungary	1st	100 metres	11.52	
2017	European Youth Olympic Festival	Győr, Hungary	2nd	4 × 100 metres relay	46.05	
2018	European U18 Championships	Győr, Hungary	22nd (sf)	100 metres	12.26	
2019	European U20 Championships	Borås, Sweden	2nd	4 × 100 metres relay	44.21	
2021	European U20 Championships	Tallinn, Estonia	5th	100 metres	11.49	
2021	European U20 Championships	Tallinn, Estonia	2nd	200 metres	23.55	
2022	World Championships	Eugene, United States	13th	4 × 100 metres relay	43.46	
2022	European Championships	Munich, Germany	5th (Note: Bisschops competed in round 1, but was replaced in the final. The time is from round 1, the position is from the final.)	4 × 100 metres relay	43.75	
2024	World Relays	Nassau, The Bahamas	6th	4 × 100 metres relay	43.07	
2024	European Championships	Rome, Italy	3rd	4 × 100 metres relay	42.46	
2024	Summer Olympics	Saint-Denis, France	7th	4 × 100 metres relay	42.74	
2025	European Team Championships First Division	Madrid, Spain	3rd (Note: No medals are awarded for individual events at the European Athletics Team Championships.)	100 metres	11.17	PB
2025	European Team Championships First Division	Madrid, Spain	1st	4 × 100 metres relay	42.02	CR NR
2025	European Team Championships First Division	Madrid, Spain	4th	Team	384.5 pts	

=== Circuit wins ===
- World Athletics Continental Tour
  - 2025 (3): Leiden Gouden Spike (200 m 23.00 and mixed 4×100 m relay 41.29), Vari Dromia International Sprint and Relays Meeting (100 m 10.89 w and 200 m 22.39)
