= 2024 European Athletics Championships – Women's 200 metres =

Women's 200 metres at the 2024 European Athletics Championships
- Venue: Stadio Olimpico
- Location: Rome
- Dates: 10 June (round 1 & semifinals); 11 June (final)
- Competitors: 34 from 21 nations
- Winning time: 22.49

Medalists
gold medal	Mujinga Kambundji	Switzerland
silver medal	Daryll Neita	Great Britain
bronze medal	Hélène Parisot	France

The women's 200 metres at the 2024 European Athletics Championships took place at the Stadio Olimpico on 10 and 11 June.

== Records ==
Standing records prior to the 2024 European Athletics Championships
World record	Florence Griffith-Joyner (USA)	21.34	Seoul, South Korea	29 September 1988
European record	Dafne Schippers (NED)	21.63	Beijing, China	21 August 2015
Championship record	Heike Drechsler (GDR)	21.71	Stuttgart, West Germany	29 August 1986
World Leading	McKenzie Long (USA)	22.03	Gainesville, United States	11 May 2024
Europe Leading	Dina Asher-Smith (GBR)	22.29	Austin, United States	26 April 2024

== Schedule ==
Date	Time	Round
10 June 2024	10:35	Round 1
10 June 2024	21:05	Semifinals
11 June 2024	22:53	Final

All times are local times (UTC+1)

== Results ==
=== Round 1 ===
Qualification: The next 12 fastest (q) advance to Semi-Finals.

Wind:
Heat 1: -0.1 m/s, Heat 2: +0.7 m/s, Heat 3: -0.1 m/s

Rank	Heat	Lane	Name	Nationality	Time	Note
1	1	6	Talea Prepens	Germany	22.83	q, PB
2	1	2	Helene Parisot	France	22.86	q, PB
3	3	6	Julia Henriksson	Sweden	22.91	q
4	2	4	Nora Lindahl	Sweden	22.97	q, PB
5	3	9	Jessica-Bianca Wessolly	Germany	23.00	q, SB
6	3	2	Irene Siragusa	Italy	23.12	q
7	3	7	Martyna Kotwiła	Poland	23.14	q, SB
8	2	7	Lorène Bazolo	Portugal	23.18	q, SB
9	2	6	Gunta Vaičule	Latvia	23.23	q, SB
10	1	9	Alexa Sulyán	Hungary	23.30	q
11	2	5	Sarah Atcho-Jaquier	Switzerland	23.35	q
12	3	4	Esperança Cladera	Spain	23.42	q
13	1	7	Aino Pulkkinen	Finland	23.44	
14	3	8	Ivana Ilić	Serbia	23.49	SB
15	2	3	Phil Healy	Ireland	23.51	
16	1	3	Artemis Melina Anastasiou	Greece	23.52	
17	2	8	Marlena Granaszewska	Poland	23.53	
17	2	9	Anniinna Kortetmaa	Finland	23.53	SB
19	1	5	Lukrecija Sabaityté	Lithuania	23.56	
20	1	8	Fabienne Hoenke	Switzerland	23.59	
21	1	4	Christine Bjelland Jensen	Norway	23.68	=SB
22	3	5	Ann Mari Kivikas	Estonia	23.78	
23	3	3	Tetiana Kaysen	Ukraine	24.31	

=== Semifinals ===
Qualification Rule: First 2 in each heat (Q) and the next 2 fastest (q) advance to Final.

Wind:
Heat 1: +0.5 m/s, Heat 2: +0.2 m/s, Heat 3: +0.1 m/s

Rank	Heat	Lane	Name	Nationality	Time	Note
1	1	6	Daryll Neita*	Great Britain	22.51	Q
2	3	7	Mujinga Kambundji*	Switzerland	22.52	Q, SB
3	1	8	Tasa Jiya*	Netherlands	22.70	Q, SB
4	2	6	Henriette Jæger*	Norway	22.71	Q
5	1	4	Helene Parisot	France	22.73	q, PB
6	2	8	Jaël Bestué*	Spain	22.81	Q, SB
7	3	5	Julia Henriksson	Sweden	22.82	Q, =NR
8	1	5	Polyniki Emmanouilidou*	Greece	22.84	q, PB
9	2	5	Nora Lindahl	Sweden	22.89	PB
10	3	6	Olivia Fotopoulou*	Cyprus	22.92	SB
11	1	7	Dalia Kaddari*	Italy	22.98	SB
12	2	9	Talea Prepens	Germany	22.99	
13	3	8	Boglárka Takács*	Hungary	23.09	
14	2	4	Léonie Pointet*	Switzerland	23.17	
15	2	2	Irene Siragusa	Italy	23.17	
16	3	4	Paula Sevilla*	Spain	23.19	
17	1	9	Sarah Atcho-Jaquier	Switzerland	23.21	
18	3	9	Jessica-Bianca Wessolly	Germany	23.27	
19	2	7	Krystsina Tsimanouskaya*	Poland	23.34	
20	1	3	Esperança Cladera	Spain	23.37	
21	3	2	Lorène Bazolo	Portugal	23.39	
22	2	3	Alexa Sulyán	Hungary	23.42	
23	1	2	Martyna Kotwiła	Poland	23.44	
24	3	3	Gunta Vaičule	Latvia	23.48	

*Athletes that received a bye into the semifinal

=== Final ===
Wind: +0.7 m/s

Rank	Lane	Name	Nationality	Time	Note
1st place, gold medalist(s)	6	Mujinga Kambundji	Switzerland	22.49	SB
2nd place, silver medalist(s)	8	Daryll Neita	Great Britain	22.50	=SB
3rd place, bronze medalist(s)	3	Helene Parisot	France	22.63	PB
4	7	Henriette Jæger	Norway	22.83	
5	5	Tasa Jiya	Netherlands	22.90	
6	4	Julia Henriksson	Sweden	22.91	
7	9	Jaël Bestué	Spain	22.93	
8	2	Polyniki Emmanouilidou	Greece	23.01	
