= 2022 World Athletics Championships – Women's 4 × 100 metres relay =

Women's 4 × 100 metres relay at the 2022 World Championships
- Venue: Hayward Field
- Dates: 22 July (heats); 23 July (final)
- Competitors: 93 from 16 nations
- Winning time: 41.14

Medalists
gold medal	Melissa Jefferson; Abby Steiner; Jenna Prandini; Twanisha Terry; Aleia Hobbs*	United States
silver medal	Kemba Nelson; Elaine Thompson-Herah; Shelly-Ann Fraser-Pryce; Shericka Jackson; Briana Williams*; Natalliah Whyte*; Remona Burchell*	Jamaica
bronze medal	Tatjana Pinto; Alexandra Burghardt; Gina Lückenkemper; Rebekka Haase	Germany

Video on YouTube Official Video

The women's 4 × 100 metres relay at the 2022 World Athletics Championships was held at the Hayward Field in Eugene on 22 and 23 July 2022.

== Records ==
Before the competition records were as follows:

Record	Athlete & Nat.	Perf.	Location	Date
World record	United States; Tianna Madison, Allyson Felix, Bianca Knight, Carmelita Jeter	40.82	London, Great Britain	10 August 2012
Championship record	Jamaica; Veronica Campbell-Brown, Natasha Morrison, Elaine Thompson, Shelly-Ann Fraser-Pryce	41.07	Beijing, China	29 August 2015
World Leading	Switzerland; Géraldine Frey, Mujinga Kambundji, Salomé Kora, Ajla del Ponte	42.13	Stockholm, Sweden	30 June 2022
African Record	Nigeria; Beatrice Utondu, Faith Idehen, Christy Opara, Mary Onyali	42.39	Barcelona, Spain	7 August 1992
Asian Record	(China) Sichuan; Lin Xiao, Li Yali, Liu Xiaomei, Li Xuemei	42.23	Shanghai, China	23 October 1997
North, Central American and Caribbean record	United States; Tianna Madison, Allyson Felix, Bianca Knight, Carmelita Jeter	40.82	London, Great Britain	10 August 2012
South American Record	Brazil; Evelyn dos Santos, Ana Claudia Lemos, Franciela Krasucki, Rosângela Santos	42.29	Moscow, Russia	18 August 2013
European Record	East Germany; Silke Möller, Sabine Rieger, Ingrid Auerswald, Marlies Göhr	41.37	Canberra, Australia	6 October 1985
Oceanian record	Australia; Rachael Massey, Suzanne Broadrick, Melinda Gainsford-Taylor, Jodi Lambert	42.99	Pietersburg, South Africa	18 March 2000

== Qualification standard ==
The standard to qualify automatically for entry was to finish in the first 10 at 2021 World Relays, completed by 6 2021-2022 top lists' teams.

== Schedule ==
The event schedule, in local time (UTC-7), was as follows:

Date	Time	Round
22 July	17:40	Heats
23 July	19:30	Final

== Results ==
=== Heats ===
The first three in each heat (Q) and the next two fastest (q) qualified for the final.

Rank	Heat	Lane	Nation	Athletes	Time	Notes
1	2	2	United States	Melissa Jefferson, Aleia Hobbs, Jenna Prandini, Twanisha Terry	41.56	Q, WL
2	1	4	Great Britain & N.I.	Asha Philip, Imani Lansiquot, Ashleigh Nelson, Daryll Neita	41.99	Q
3	1	8	Jamaica	Briana Williams, Natalliah Whyte, Remona Burchell, Kemba Nelson	42.37	Q, SB
4	1	3	Germany	Tatjana Pinto, Alexandra Burghardt, Gina Lückenkemper, Rebekka Haase	42.44	Q, SB
5	2	8	Spain	Sonia Molina-Prados, Jaël Bestué, Paula Sevilla, Maria Isabel Pérez	42.61	Q, NR
6	2	1	Nigeria	Joy Chinenye Udo-Gabriel, Favour Ofili, Rosemary Chukwuma, Nzubechi Grace Nwokocha	42.68	Q, SB
7	2	4	Italy	Zaynab Dosso, Dalia Kaddari, Anna Bongiorni, Vittoria Fontana	42.71	q, NR
8	2	7	Switzerland	Géraldine Frey, Sarah Atcho, Salomé Kora, Ajla del Ponte	42.73	q
9	1	7	China	Li He, Ge Manqi, Wei Yongli, Liang Xiaojing	42.93	SB
10	1	1	Canada	Crystal Emmanuel, Khamica Bingham, Jacqueline Madogo, Leya Buchanan	43.09	
11	1	6	Poland	Magdalena Stefanowicz, Martyna Kotwiła, Marika Popowicz-Drapała, Ewa Swoboda	43.19	SB
12	1	5	Japan	Masumi Aoki, Arisa Kimishima, Mei Kodama, Midori Mikase	43.33	NR
13	2	5	Netherlands	Andrea Bouma, Zoë Sedney, Minke Bisschops, Naomi Sedney	43.46	
13	2	6	Denmark	Mette Graversgaard, Mathilde Kramer, Astrid Glenner-Frandsen, Ida Karstoft	43.46	NR
15	2	3	Ecuador	Yuliana Angulo, Anahí Suárez, Nicole Caicedo, Nicole Jazmine Chala	44.17	SB
16	1	2	Ireland	Joan Healy, Adeyemi Talabi, Lauren Roy, Sarah Leahy	44.48	

=== Final ===
The final started on 23 July at 19:30.

Rank	Lane	Nation	Athletes	Time	Notes
1st place, gold medalist(s)	3	United States	Melissa Jefferson, Abby Steiner, Jenna Prandini, Twanisha Terry	41.14	WL
2nd place, silver medalist(s)	5	Jamaica	Kemba Nelson, Elaine Thompson-Herah, Shelly-Ann Fraser-Pryce, Shericka Jackson	41.18	SB
3rd place, bronze medalist(s)	7	Germany	Tatjana Pinto, Alexandra Burghardt, Gina Lückenkemper, Rebekka Haase	42.03	SB
4	8	Nigeria	Joy Chinenye Udo-Gabriel, Favour Ofili, Rosemary Chukwuma, Nzubechi Grace Nwokocha	42.22	AR
5	4	Spain	Sonia Molina-Prados, Jaël Bestué, Paula Sevilla, Maria Isabel Pérez	42.58	NR
6	6	Great Britain & N.I.	Asha Philip, Imani Lansiquot, Dina Asher-Smith, Daryll Neita	42.75	
7	1	Switzerland	Géraldine Frey, Mujinga Kambundji, Salomé Kora, Ajla del Ponte	42.81	
8	2	Italy	Zaynab Dosso, Dalia Kaddari, Anna Bongiorni, Vittoria Fontana	42.92	
