= Elise Mehuys =

Belgian sprinter (born 1995)

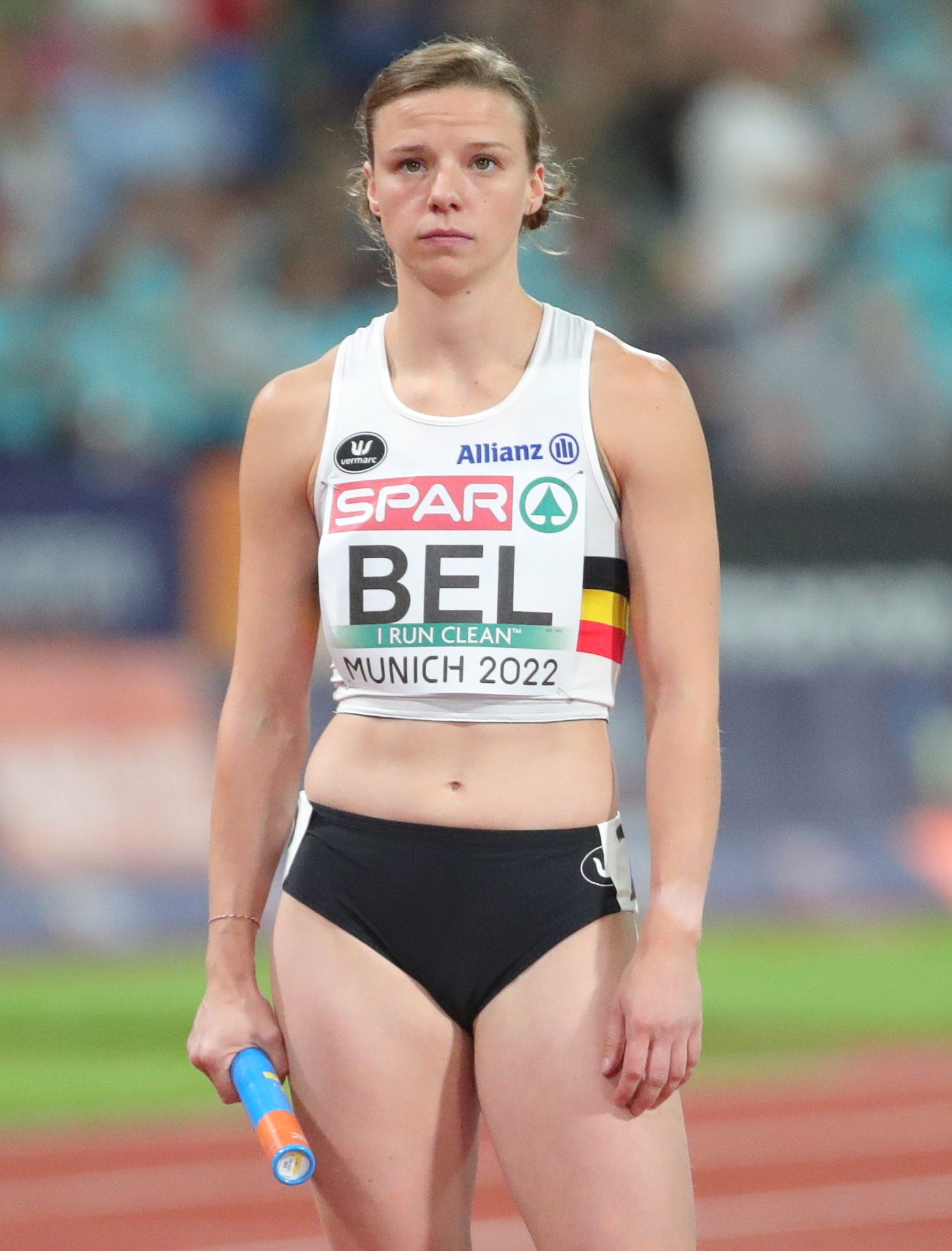
- Mehuys in 2022

Personal information
- Nationality: Belgian
- Born: 1 November 1995 (age 30)

Sport
- Country: Belgium
- Sport: Athletics
- Event(s): 60 metres, 100 metres, 200 metres
- Club: Atletiekclub Lyra

Elise Mehuys (born 1 November 1995) is a Belgian sprinter.

== Career ==
=== 2020 ===
In February, Mehuys won the Belgian Indoor title 60 metres dash.

=== 2022 ===
In August, Mehuys was part of the Belgian women's 4 x 100 metres relay team that qualified for the final of the 4 × 100 metres relay at the 2022 European Athletics Championships in Munich, Germany with a seasons best time of 43.58 in the semi-final, before finishing sixth in the final.

=== 2024 ===
In May, Mehuys ran as part of the Belgian 4 × 100 m relay team at the 2024 World Relays Championships in Nassau, Bahamas that failed to qualify in the Olympic Qualifying round for the 2024 Summer Olympics.

She represented Belgium at the 2024 European Athletics Championships in Rome in June 2024 as a member of the Belgian 4 × 100 m relay team that qualified for the final and finished 6th.

She represented Belgium at the 2024 Summer Olympics in Paris, France as a member of Belgium's women's 4 × 100 metres relay team that, having missed direct qualification at the World Relays Championships managed to qualify for the 2024 Summer Olympic Games via the World Athletics Rankings. The team was however disqualified in round 1 of the women's 4 × 100 metres relay when Mehuys passed the baton to Delphine Nkansa outside the takeover zone.

== Personal bests ==
Outdoor

- 100 metres – 11.29 * (+3.7 m/s Brugge 2023)
- 200 metres – 23.50 (+1.0 m/s Brussels 2023)

Indoor

- 60 metres – 7.31 (Gent 2020)
- 200 metres – 24.11 (Gent 2018)
