= Alexa Sulyán =

Hungarian athlete

Personal information
- Nationality: Hungarian
- Born: 17 April 2005 (age 21) Budapest, Veresegyház

Sport
- Sport: Athletics
- Event: Sprint

Achievements and titles
- Personal best(s): 100m: 11.56 (Budapest, 2023); 200m: 23.12 (Budapest, 2023)
Medal record
Women's athletics
Representing Hungary
European U20 Championships
Silver medal – second place	2023 Jerusalem	200m

Alexa Sulyán (born 17 April 2005) is a Hungarian former YouTuber and track and field athlete who competes as a sprinter. In 2025, she became Hungarian national champion indoors over 200 metres.

== Early life ==
She is from Gödöllő, in Pest County. Sulyán was educated at Újpesti Bródy Imre Gimnázium in Budapest.

== Career ==
Alexa Sulyán started her public career making YouTube videos under the name Szandimandi. Her channel even reached 100,000 subscribers, but came to a hault due to the bullying of her young age.

A MATE-Gödöllő EAC athlete, she is coached by Katalin Körmendy. In January 2023, Sulyán broke the national U20 indoor record of Boglárka Takács, over 200 metres, running 24.02 seconds in Nyíregyháza.

In June 2023, Sulyán set a new national U20 record for the 200 metres, running 23.12 seconds in Budapest. In August 2023, she won a silver medal in the 200 metres at the 2023 European Athletics U20 Championships in Jerusalem.

She had her first experience of senior international competition at the 2023 European Athletics Team Championships and was selected for the 2023 World Athletics Championships, held in Budapest, and competed in the 200 metres.

She ran as part of the Hungarian 4 × 100 m relay team at the 2024 World Relays Championships in Nassau, Bahamas. Competing over 200 metres at the 2024 European Championships in Rome, Italy in June 2024, she qualified for the semi-finals with a run of 23.30 seconds. Later on in the championships, she also competed as part of the Hungarian team in the women's 4 x 100 metres relay.

She won the 200 metres race at the Hungarian Indoor Athletics Championships in February 2025, for her first individual senior national title.

Sulyán was a finalist over 60 metres and placed second behind Janka Molnár in the 200 metres at the 2026 Hungarian Indoor Championships in Nyíregyháza.
