= N'Ketia Seedo =

Dutch sprinter

N'ketia Seedo
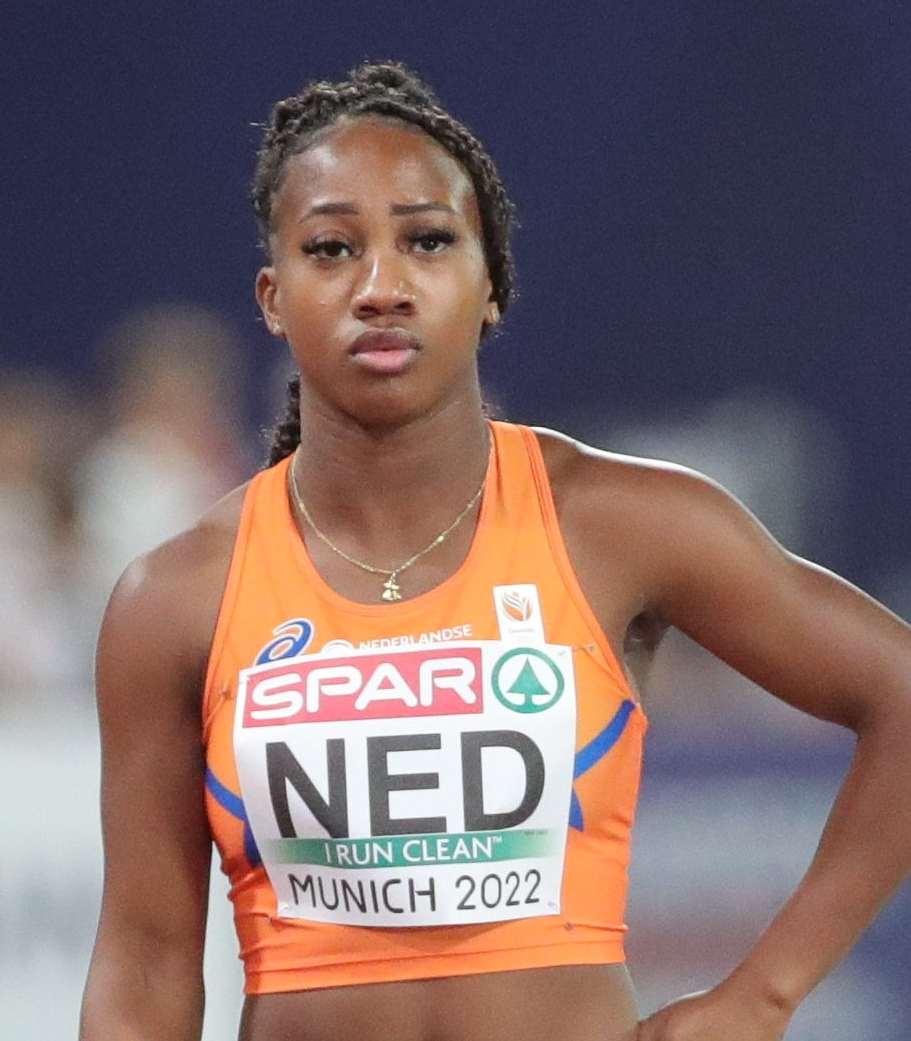
- Seedo in 2022

Personal information
- Nationality: Dutch
- Born: 7 June 2003 (age 23) Utrecht, Netherlands

Sport
- Sport: Track and field
- Event(s): 60 m, 100 m, 200 m
Medal record
Women's athletics
Representing Netherlands
European Games
Gold medal – first place	2023 Kraków-Małopolska	4×100 m relay
Bronze medal – third place	2023 Kraków-Małopolska	100 m
European U23 Championships
Gold medal – first place	2023 Espoo	100 m
World U20 Championships
Bronze medal – third place	2022 Cali	100 m
European U20 Championships
Silver medal – second place	2019 Borås	100 m
Silver medal – second place	2019 Borås	4×100 m relay

N'ketia Seedo (Dutch: [nəˈkeːtijaː ˈseːdoː]; born 7 June 2003) is a Dutch track and field athlete who competes in sprint races. She won the Dutch national indoor championships over 60 metres in 2020, 2022 and 2023.

== Early life ==
N'ketia (Note: Both Seedo and her sports management capitalize her first name as N'ketia.) Seedo is born on 7 June 2003 in Utrecht, Netherlands. She is of Surinamese descent.

== Career ==
=== Youth ===
Seedo was racing and beating senior athletes from an early age. She was 15 years old when she finished third at the Dutch indoor national championships 60 m race, behind Schippers and Jamile Samuel in 2019.

She was runner-up in the 100 metres, running 11.40 seconds, at the 2019 European Athletics U20 Championships in Borås, Sweden, losing in a photo finish to Vittoria Fontana who was also clocked at 11.40 s. She also claimed a silver at that championships in the 4 × 100 m relay.

Seedo won the Dutch 60 m indoor title for a second time in 7.24 seconds in 2020, the second-fastest time by a junior of all time and the European U18 best, a record that would last until 2025 when it was broken by Kelly Doualla.

=== Junior ===
Seedo won the Dutch 60 m indoor title for a third time in 2022.

Seedo won bronze at the 2022 World Athletics U20 Championships in the 100 m at the Pascual Guerrero Stadium, in Cali in August 2022, running 11.16 s, a new national under-20 record, in the heats, before going fractionally better running 11.15 s in the final.

She was a member of the Dutch 4 × 100 m relay team that finished fifth at the 2022 European Athletics Championships in August 2022 in Munich.

=== Senior ===
Selected for the 2023 World Athletics Championships in Budapest, she qualified for the semi-final of the 100 metres.

She reached the semi-finals of the women's 60 metres at the 2024 World Athletics Indoor Championships in Glasgow.

She ran as part of the Dutch 4 × 100 m relay team which qualified for the 2024 Paris Olympics at the 2024 World Relays Championships in Nassau, Bahamas.

== Personal bests ==
Information based on her World Athletics profile.

=== Individual events ===
Personal best times for individual events
Type	Event	Time (s)	Venue	Date	Notes
Outdoor	100 metres	11.11	Budapest, Hungary	20 August 2023	(Wind: -0.4 m/s)
Outdoor	150 metres	16.73 w	Lisse, Netherlands	13 May 2023	Wind-assisted: +2.6 m/s
Outdoor	200 metres	23.44	Oordegem, Belgium	27 May 2023	(Wind: +0.2 m/s)
Indoor	60 metres	7.15 i	Düsseldorf, Germany	4 February 2024	

=== Team events ===
Personal best times for team events
Type	Event	Time (s)	Venue	Date	Notes
Outdoor	4 × 100 metres relay	42.38	London, United Kingdom	23 July 2023	Teamed with Marije van Hunenstijn, Jamile Samuel, and Tasa Jiya.
