= Gémima Joseph =

French athlete (born 2001)

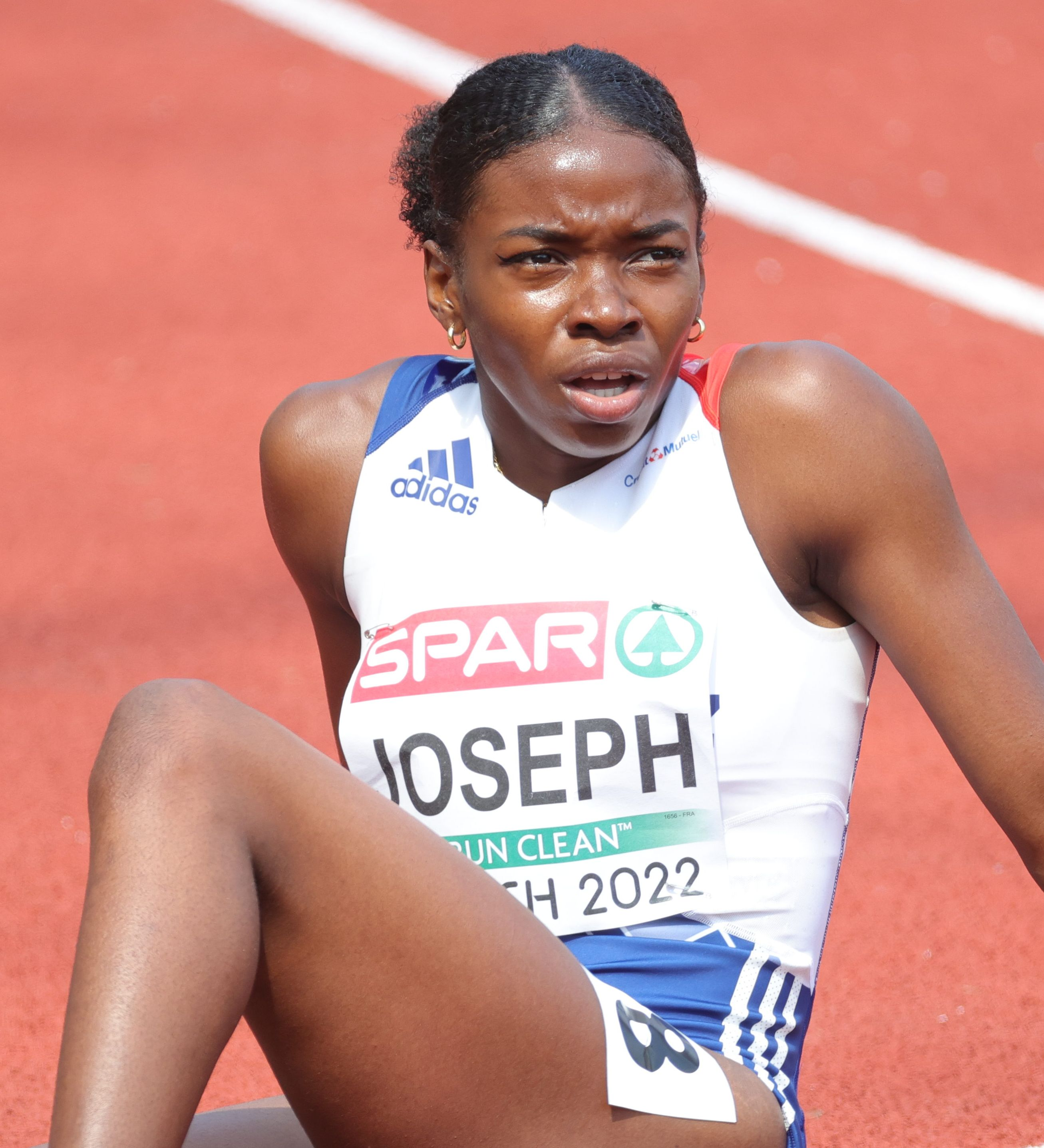
- Joseph at the 2022 European Championships

Personal information
- Nationality: French
- Born: 17 October 2001 (age 24) Kourou, French Guiana
- Height: 164 cm (5 ft 5 in)
- Weight: 54 kg (119 lb)

Sport
- Country: France
- Sport: Athletics
- Events: 60 m, 100 m, 200 m
- Club: Amazonie Athletic Academy
- Coached by: Gaetan Tariaffe; Lawrence Boogie Johnson
Medal record
Women's athletics
Representing France
World Relays
Silver medal – second place	2024 Nassau	4 × 100 m relay
European Championships
Silver medal – second place	2024 Rome	4 × 100 m relay
Mediterranean Games
Gold medal – first place	2026 Taranto	100 m
European U23 Championships
Silver medal – second place	2023 Espoo	4 × 100 m relay
Bronze medal – third place	2023 Espoo	200 m
European U20 Championships
Silver medal – second place	2019 Borås	200 m

Gémima Joseph (born 17 October 2001) is a French sprinter. She won the 100 metres and 200 metres sprint double at the French Athletics Championships in both 2024 and 2026. She won a silver medal in the women's 4 × 100 metres relay at the 2024 European Athletics Championships.

== Early life ==
From French Guiana, Joseph was hugely influenced as a teenager when she started being coached by former international sprinter Katia Benth, and then when Benth had ill-health, Joseph was coached by Benth's former coach Gaetan Tariaffe. Joseph has made the decision to stay mostly based away from mainland France in favour of remaining in her homeland. She studies in Cayenne for a Diploma in Accounting and Management.

== Career ==
Joseph won the bronze medal in athletics 200 m during the European Youth Olympic Festival in 2017, held in Győr, Hungary. She became the French junior champion in both 100 m and 200 m in 2019, and won silver in the 200 m at the European Junior Championship in 2019.

On 16 June 2021 in Cergy-Pontoise, Joseph ran 22:77 for the 200 m and became the first Frenchwoman to make the qualifying standard for the 200 m at the delayed 2020 Olympic Games. In doing so, she also became the fastest Frenchwoman over the distance for seven years. Remarkably, due to the COVID-19 pandemic, the race had come for Joseph after an enforced 10 day quarantine following her arrival in France which had affected her ability to train. Earlier at the meeting she also broke her 100 m personal best, by running 11:40.

In April 2024 at the Guyana Games, she ran personal best times of 11.04 seconds for the 100 metres and 22.57 seconds for the 200 metres. She ran as part of the French 4 × 100 m relay team which finished as runner-up and qualified for the 2024 Paris Olympics at the 2024 World Relays Championships in Nassau, Bahamas. She finished sixth in the 100 metres final at the 2024 European Athletics Championships in Rome in a time of 11.06 seconds.

Joseph won a sprint double at the French Athletics Championships in June 2024 in Angers, including a personal best 11.01 seconds for the 100 metres. She competed at the 2024 Summer Olympics in Paris over 200 metres, reaching the semi-finals. She also competed in the 100 metres race at the Games. She then also ran as part of the France relay team that competed in the 4 × 100 m relay at the Games.

In September 2025, she competed as the French team placed sixth in the women's 4 × 100 metres at the 2025 World Championships in Tokyo, Japan.

Joseph was selected as part of the French team in May 2026 for the 2026 World Athletics Relays and ran in the mixed 4 × 100 metres relay. She also ran in the women's 4 × 100 metres relay at the championships in Gaborone, Botswana. On 25 July 2026, she won the 100 metres at the 2026 French Championships, running 11.26 seconds into a headwind. The following day she returned to also win the 200 metres final. Competing at the 2026 European Athletics Championships in Birmingham, England, in August, she was a finalist in the 200 metres placing fifth overall. She also competed in the women's 4 × 400 metres relay at the championships as France placed fifth in the final. In September, she competed over 200 m at the inaugural World Ultimate Championship in Budapest.
