= Hélène Parisot =

French athlete (born 1992)

Personal information
- Born: 17 December 1992 (age 33) Lisieux, France
- Height: 163 cm (5 ft 4 in)
- Weight: 53 kg (117 lb)

Sport
- Country: France
- Sport: Athletics
- Event: Sprint
- Coached by: Kenny Guex

Achievements and titles
- Personal bests: 100 m: 11.35 (Albi, 2023); 200 m: 22.42 (Madrid, 2025)
Medal record
Women's athletics
Representing France
World Relays
| Silver medal – second place | 2024 Nassau | 4 × 100 m relay |
European Championships
| Silver medal – second place | 2024 Rome | 4 × 100 m relay |
| Bronze medal – third place | 2024 Rome | 200 m |

Hélène Parisot (born 17 December 1992) is a French sprinter. She won the bronze medal in the 200 metres and silver in the women's 4 × 100 metres relay at the 2024 European Athletics Championships.

== Early life ==
Parisot is from Saint-Affrique in Aveyron. She attended Toulouse Capitole University.

== Career ==
Parisot ran as part of the French relay team in the 4 × 100 m at the 2022 European Championships in Munich that qualified for the final.

Parisot placed second in the 200 m and third in the 100 m at the 2023 French Athletics Championships in Albi, equalling her 200 m personal best of 23.26 seconds and setting a new 100 m personal best time of 11.35 seconds. She ran for France at the 2023 World Athletics Championships in Budapest.

Parisot ran as part of the French 4 × 100 m relay team which finished as runner-up and qualified for the 2024 Paris Olympics at the 2024 World Relays Championships in Nassau, Bahamas.

Parisot finished third in the 200 metres at the 2024 Diamond League event 2024 Meeting International Mohammed VI d'Athlétisme in Rabat in a personal best time of 23.02 seconds.

Parisot won bronze in 22.63 seconds in the final of the 200 metres at the European Athletics Championships in Rome in June 2024, having broken her own personal best in each of the three races she competed. She competed at the 2024 Summer Olympics in Paris over 200 metres, reaching the semi-finals. She also competed in the 4 × 100 m relay at the Games, with her French team placing fourth in the final.

Parosit competed at the 2025 World Athletics Relays in China in the Women's 4 × 100 metres relay in May 2025. She ran a personal best 22.42 seconds for the 200 metres as she finished second competing for France at the 2025 European Athletics Team Championships First Division in Madrid in June 2025. In September 2025, she was a semi-finalist in the 200 metres at the 2025 World Championships in Tokyo, Japan. She also ran in the women's 4 × 100 metres relay at the championships, as the French team placed sixth overall.

In May 2026, she ran at the 2026 World Athletics Relays in the mixed 4 × 100 metres relay. She also ran in the women's 4 × 100 metres relay at the championships in Gaborone, Botswana.
