= 2019 European Athletics U20 Championships =

- Dates: 18–21 July
- Host city: Borås, Sweden
- Venue: Ryavallen
- Level: Under 20
- Events: 44
- Participation: 1114 athletes from 48 nations

The 2019 European Athletics U20 Championships were the 25th edition of the biennial European U20 athletics championships. They were held in Borås, Sweden from 18 July to 21 July. Beginning with this edition the long-distance races for men were 3000 and 5000 metres instead of 5000 and 10,000 metres mirroring the women's programme.

== Medal summary ==
=== Men ===
==== Track ====
Event	Gold		Silver		Bronze	
100 metres	Lorenzo Paissan; Italy	10.44	Antoni Plichta; Poland	10.52	Chad Miller; Great Britain	10.53
200 metres	Onyema Adigida; Netherlands	21.08	Elias Goer; Germany	21.16	Mattia Donola; Italy	21.18
400 metres	Edoardo Scotti; Italy	45.85; EU20L	Bernat Erta; Spain	46.24; PB	Ricky Petrucciani; Switzerland	46.34
800 metres	Oliver Dustin; Great Britain	1:50.56	Ben Pattison; Great Britain	1:50.68	Finley McLear; Great Britain	1:51.19
1500 metres	Nuno Pereira; Portugal	3:55.85	Robin van Riel; Netherlands	3:56.03	Joshua Lay; Great Britain	3:56.20
3000 metres	Elias Schreml; Germany	8:16.07; PB	Miloš Malešević; Serbia	8:16.68; PB	Ömer Amaçtan; Turkey	8:17.51; PB
5000 metres	Aarón Las Heras; Spain	14:02.76; PB	Ayetullah Aslanhan; Turkey	14:05.01; PB	Darragh McElhinney; Ireland	14:06.05
110 metres hurdles (100 cm)	Joshua Zeller; Great Britain	13.39	Mark Heiden; Netherlands	13.58; PB	Paul Chabauty; France	13.64
400 metres hurdles	Carl Bengtström; Sweden	50.32; SB	Seamus Derbyshire; Great Britain	50.86; PB	Matej Baluch; Slovakia	51.26; PB
3000 metres steeplechase	Murat Yalçınkaya; Turkey	8:58.20	Omar Nuur; Sweden	8:58.79; PB	Etson Barros; Portugal	9:01.85
4 × 100 metres relay	Germany; Fabian Olbert; Simon Wulff; Elias Goer; Lucas Ansah-Peprah	39.79	Italy; Mattia Donola; Lorenzo Paissan; Lorenzo Ianes; Lorenzo Patta	39.89	Netherlands; Keitharo Oosterwolde; Mark Heiden; Gino van Wijk; Brett Duff	40.28
4 × 400 metres relay	Turkey; Oğuzhan Kaya; Kubilay Ençü; Berke Akçam; İlyas Çanakçı; Emirhan Koş*	3:08.34; EU20L	Czech Republic; Ladislav Töpfer; Filip Ličman; Daniel Lehár; Matěj Krsek; Jakub Majercák*	3:08.50; NU20R	Spain; Eliezer Zolawo; Javier Sánchez; Vicente Antúnez; Bernat Erta; Gerson Pozo*	3:08.66
10,000 m walk	Mikita Kaliada; Belarus	41:10.03; EU20L	Riccardo Orsoni; Italy	41:51.71; PB	Łukasz Niedziałek; Poland	42:20.66; SB

* Medalists who participated in heats only.

==== Field ====
Event	Gold		Silver		Bronze	
High jump	Thomas Carmoy; Belgium	2.22	Oleh Doroshchuk; Ukraine	2.14	Arttu Mattila; Finland	2.12; SB
Pole vault	Pål Haugen Lillefosse; Norway	5.41	Illya Kravchenko; Ukraine	5.31	Robin Emig; France	5.31; PB
Long jump	Jules Pommery; France	7.83; PB	Jarod Biya; Switzerland	7.78; NU20R	Andreas Samuel Bucșă; Romania	7.53
Triple jump	Artem Konovalenko; Ukraine	16.50; EU20L	Mark Mazheika; Belarus	16.22; PB	Andreas Pantazis; Greece	16.08; PB
Shot put (6 kg)	Aleh Tamashevich; Belarus	21.32	Wojciech Marok; Poland	20.07; PB	Alperen Karahan; Turkey	19.76
Discus throw (1.75 kg)	Yasiel Sotero; Spain	62.93	Michal Forejt; Czech Republic	62.17; PB	Jakub Forejt; Czech Republic	61.64
Hammer throw (6 kg)	Mykhaylo Kokhan; Ukraine	84.73; EU20R CR WU20L	Hristos Frantzeskakis; Greece	84.22; NU20R	Giorgio Olivieri; Italy	78.75
Javelin throw	Simon Wieland; Switzerland	79.44; NU23R	Krišjānis Suntažs; Latvia	79.23; PB	Dimítrios Tsitsos; Greece	77.79; PB

==== Combined ====
Event	Gold		Silver		Bronze	
Decathlon	Simon Ehammer; Switzerland	7851; NU20R	Leon Mak; Netherlands	7700; PB	Markus Rooth; Norway	7692; PB

=== Women ===
==== Track ====
Event	Gold		Silver		Bronze	
100 metres	Vittoria Fontana; Italy	11.40; NU20R	N'ketia Seedo; Netherlands	11.40	Jaël Bestué; Spain	11.59
200 metres	Amy Hunt; Great Britain	22.94	Gémima Joseph; France	23.60	Lucie Ferauge; Belgium	23.63
400 metres	Polina Miller; Authorised Neutral Athletes	51.72; EU23L	Amber Anning; Great Britain	52.18; PB	Barbora Malíková; Czech Republic	52.37; NU20R
800 metres	Isabelle Boffey; Great Britain	2:02.92; EU20L	Delia Sclabas; Switzerland	2:03.36	Keely Hodgkinson; Great Britain	2:03.40; PB
1500 metres	Delia Sclabas; Switzerland	4:25.95	Sarah Healy; Ireland	4:27.14	Tugba Toptaş; Turkey	4:28.13
3000 metres	Zofia Dudek; Poland	9:30.06	Mariana Machado; Portugal	9:30.66	Elisa Ducoli; Italy	9:32.42
5000 metres	Klara Lukan; Slovenia	16:03.62; EU20L	Nadia Battocletti; Italy	16:09.39; PB	Laura Valgreen Petersen; Denmark	16:10.44; PB
100 metres hurdles	Tilde Johansson; Sweden	13.16; EU20L	Pia Skrzyszowska; Poland	13.35; PB	Lucy-Jane Matthews; Great Britain	13.38; NU18B
400 metres hurdles	Femke Bol; Netherlands	56.25	Sára Mátó; Hungary	56.89; NU23R	Sara Gallego; Spain	57.44; SB
3000 metres steeplechase	Paula Schneiders; Germany	10:08.66; PB	Claire Palou; France	10:12.31; NU20R	Josina Papenfuß; Germany	10:12.42
4 × 100 metres relay	Great Britain; Cassie-Ann Pemberton; Amy Hunt; Georgina Adam; Immanuela Aliu	44.11	Netherlands; Minke Bisschops; Zoë Sedney; Demi van den Wildenberg; N'ketia Seedo	44.21	Germany; Kathleen Reinhardt; Denise Uphoff; Chiara Schimpf; Talea Prepens; Svenja Pfetsch*	44.34
4 × 400 metres relay	Great Britain; Natasha Harrison; Isabelle Boffey; Louise Evans; Amber Anning; Maisey Snaith*; Nayanna Dubarry-Gay*; Hannah Foster*	3:33.03; WU23L	Belarus; Katsiaryna Zhyvayeva; Asteria Limai; Valiantsina Chymbar; Alina Luchshava	3:37.06; NU20R	Poland; Aleksandra Formella; Sara Neumann; Aleksandra Wsołek; Susane Lächele; Paulina Zielińska*	3:37.13
10,000 m walk	Meryem Bekmez; Turkey	44:44.50	Evin Demir; Turkey	46:38.68	Mariona García; Spain	46:50.50; PB

* Medalists who participated in heats only.

==== Field ====
Event	Gold		Silver		Bronze	
High jump	Yaroslava Mahuchikh; Ukraine	1.92	Adelina Khalikova; Authorised Neutral Athletes	1.90 =WU18L	Natalya Spiridonova; Authorised Neutral Athletes	1.87
Pole vault	Aksana Gataullina; Authorised Neutral Athletes	4.36; EU20L	Marie-Julie Bonnin; France	4.16; PB	Elien Vekemans; Belgium	4.16
Long jump	Larissa Iapichino; Italy	6.58	Tilde Johansson; Sweden	6.52	Holly Mills; Great Britain	6.50
Triple jump	Spyridoula Karydi; Greece	14.00; NU20R	Aleksandra Nacheva; Bulgaria	13.81	Rūta Lasmane; Latvia	13.48
Shot put	Jorinde van Klinken; Netherlands	17.39	Pınar Akyol; Turkey	16.19; WU18L	Erna Sóley Gunnarsdóttir; Iceland	15.65
Discus throw	Alida van Daalen; Netherlands	55.92; NU18B	Özlem Becerek; Turkey	54.17	Amanda Ngandu-Ntumba; France	53.22
Hammer throw	Valeriya Ivanenko; Ukraine	65.83	Samantha Borutta; Germany	63.53	Zsanett Németh; Hungary	61.99
Javelin throw	Carolina Visca; Italy	56.48	Julia Ulbricht; Germany	54.98	Gedly Tugi; Estonia	54.52; PB

==== Combined ====
Event	Gold		Silver		Bronze	
Heptathlon	María Vicente; Spain	6115; NR, WU20L	Kate O'Connor; Ireland	6093; NR	Annik Kälin; Switzerland	6069; PB

== Medal table ==
* Host nation (Sweden)

Rank	Nation	Gold	Silver	Bronze	Total
1	Great Britain (GBR)	6	3	6	15
2	Italy (ITA)	5	3	3	11
3	Netherlands (NED)	4	5	1	10
4	Ukraine (UKR)	4	2	0	6
5	Turkey (TUR)	3	4	3	10
6	Germany (GER)	3	3	2	8
7	Switzerland (SUI)	3	2	2	7
8	Spain (ESP)	3	1	4	8
9	Belarus (BLR)	2	2	0	4
9	Sweden (SWE)*	2	2	0	4
–	Authorised Neutral Athletes (ANA)	2	1	1	4
11	France (FRA)	1	3	3	7
12	Poland (POL)	1	3	2	6
13	Greece (GRE)	1	1	2	4
14	Portugal (POR)	1	1	1	3
15	Belgium (BEL)	1	0	2	3
16	Norway (NOR)	1	0	1	2
17	Slovenia (SLO)	1	0	0	1
18	Czech Republic (CZE)	0	2	2	4
19	Ireland (IRL)	0	2	1	3
20	Hungary (HUN)	0	1	1	2
20	Latvia (LAT)	0	1	1	2
22	Bulgaria (BUL)	0	1	0	1
22	Serbia (SRB)	0	1	0	1
24	Denmark (DEN)	0	0	1	1
24	Estonia (EST)	0	0	1	1
24	Finland (FIN)	0	0	1	1
24	Iceland (ISL)	0	0	1	1
24	Romania (ROU)	0	0	1	1
24	Slovakia (SVK)	0	0	1	1
Totals (29 entries)		44	44	44	132

== Participation ==
1,114 athletes from 48 nations are expected to participate in these championships.

- Armenia
- Austria
- Authorised Neutral Athletes
- Azerbaijan
- Belarus
- Belgium
- Bosnia and Herzegovina
- Bulgaria
- Croatia
- Cyprus
- Czech Republic
- Denmark
- Estonia
- Finland
- France
- Georgia
- Germany
- Gibraltar
- Great Britain
- Greece
- Hungary
- Iceland
- Ireland
- Israel
- Italy
- Kosovo
- Latvia
- Lithuania
- Luxembourg
- North Macedonia
- Malta
- Moldova
- Monaco
- Montenegro
- Netherlands
- Norway
- Poland
- Portugal
- Romania
- San Marino
- Serbia
- Slovakia
- Slovenia
- Spain
- Sweden
- Switzerland
- Turkey
- Ukraine
