= Tasa Jiya =

Dutch athlete (born 1997)

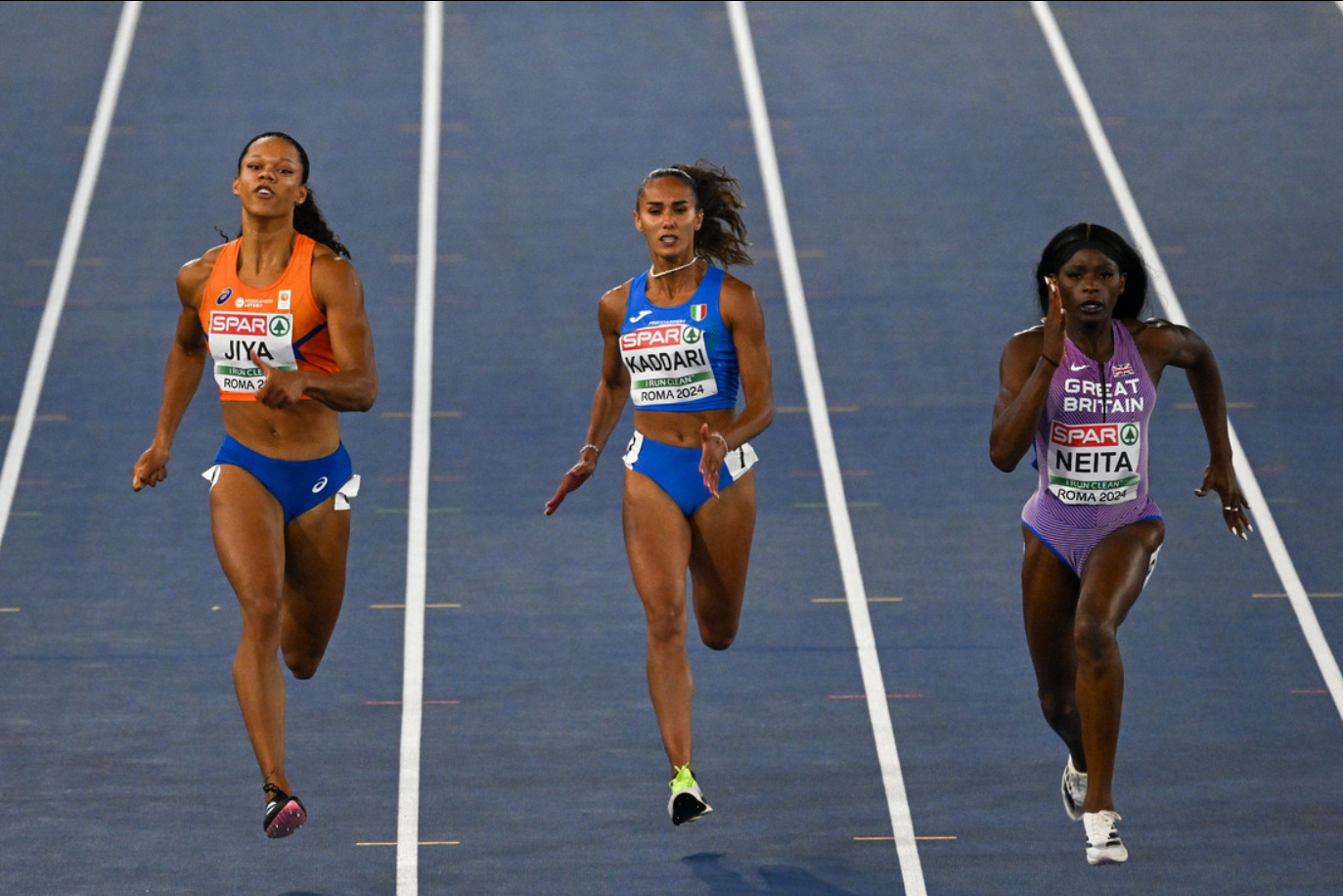
- Tasa Jiya in 2024

Personal information
- Nationality: Dutch
- Born: 16 September 1997 (age 28) Utrecht, Netherlands
- Height: 1.84 m (6 ft 0 in)

Sport
- Sport: Track and Field
- Events: 60 m, 100 m, 200 m

Achievements and titles
- Personal bests: 60 m: 7.25 (2024); 100 m: 11.22 (2024); 200 m: 22.62 (2024)
Medal record
Women's athletics
Representing the Netherlands
European Championships
Bronze medal – third place	2024 Rome	4×100 m relay
European Games
Gold medal – first place	2023 Kraków-Małopolska	4×100 m relay

Tasa Jiya (Dutch: [ˈtaːsaː ˈdʑijaː]; born 16 September 1997) is a Dutch track and field athlete who competes as a sprinter. In 2023, she became the Dutch national champion over 200 metres. She won a bronze medal in the women's 4 x 100 metres relay at the 2024 European Athletics Championships.

== Career ==
As a junior athlete, Jiya won nine national youth titles and in 2013 won gold in the 200 meters at the European Youth Olympic Festival. She had a career break after being an unused reserve for the Dutch relay team at the 2016 Olympic Games.

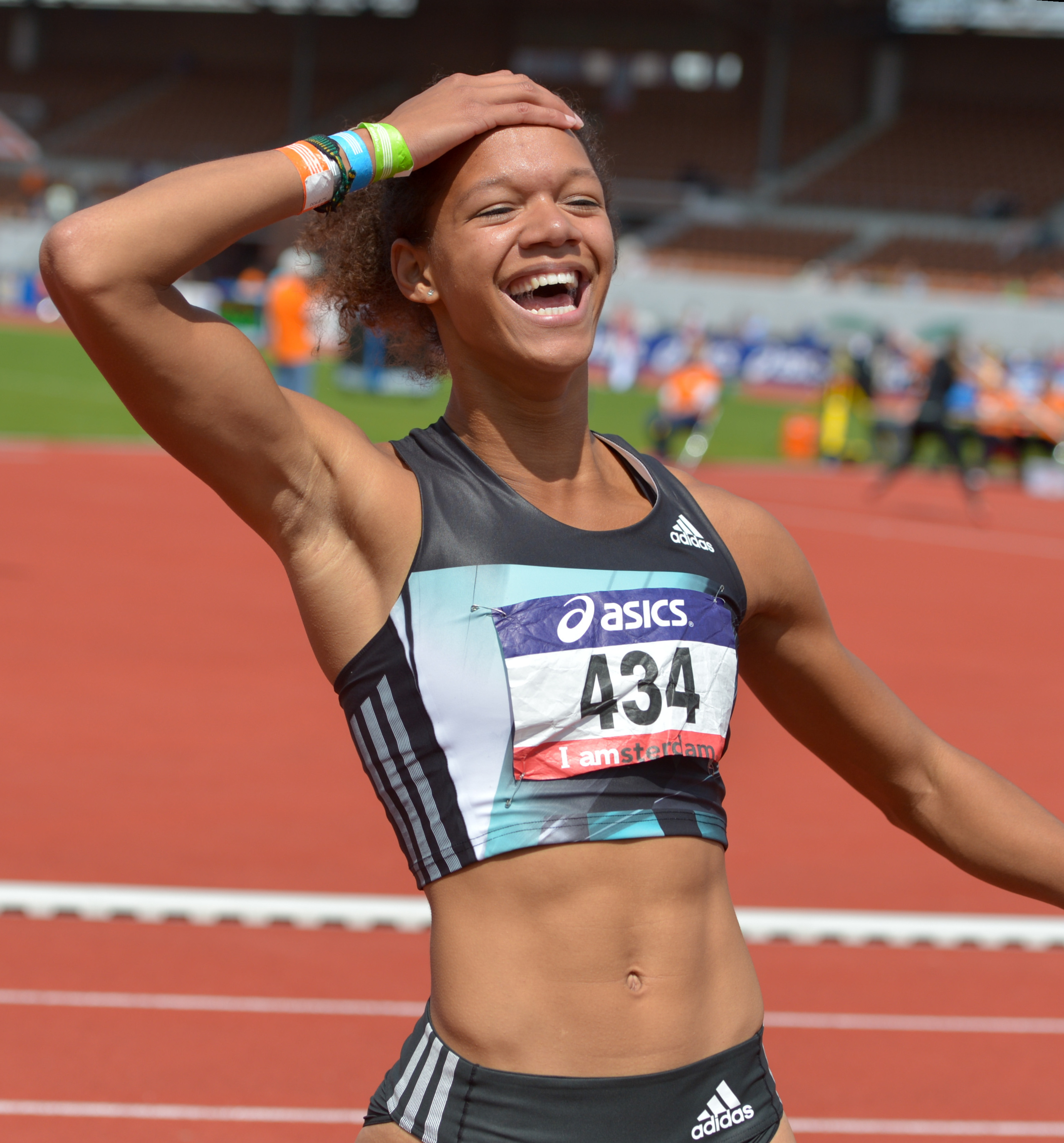
Tasa Jiya in 2016

In 2021, after returning to athletics, Jiya ran a new personal best time in the 100 metres of 11.58 seconds, and a new personal best time of 23.19 seconds in the 200 meters at a gala in Grootebroek. In 2023, she became the Dutch national champion over 200 metres, in a field which included Femke Bol. She won in a new personal best time of 22.77 seconds.

Jiya was selected for the 2023 World Athletics Championships in Budapest in August 2023, where she qualified for the semi finals of the 200 metres where she ran a new personal best of 22.67 seconds.

Jiya ran as part of the Dutch 4 × 100 m relay team which qualified for the 2024 Paris Olympics at the 2024 World Relays Championships in Nassau, Bahamas. The following month she finished sixth in the 200m at the 2024 BAUHAUS-galan Diamond League event in Stockholm.

Competing over 200 metres at the 2024 European Championships in Rome in June 2024, she finished fifth in the final having run 22.90 seconds. Later on in the championships, she won a bronze medal running the anchor leg for the Dutch team in the 4 x 100 metres relay.

In June 2024, she won the Dutch national 200 meters title in Hengelo in a personal best 22.62 seconds. She competed at the 2024 Summer Olympics in Paris over 200 metres, reaching the semi-finals. She also competed in the 4 × 100 m relay at the Games.

== Personal life ==
Jiya gave birth to a daughter, Amáru, in 2018.

== Personal bests ==
Information from Jiya's World Athletics profile unless otherwise noted.

=== Individual events ===
Type	Event	Time (s)	Venue	Date
Indoor	60 metres	7.25 i	Apeldoorn, Netherlands	27 January 2024
Indoor	60 metres	7.25 i	Apeldoorn, Netherlands	10 February 2024
Outdoor	100 metres	11.22	Hengelo, Netherlands	29 June 2024
Outdoor	200 metres	22.62	Hengelo, Netherlands	30 June 2024

=== Team events ===
Type	Event	Time (s)	Venue	Date	Notes
Outdoor	4 x 100 metres relay	42.38	London, United Kingdom	23 July 2023	Teamed with N'ketia Seedo, Marije van Hunenstijn, and Jamile Samuel. Jiya ran the anchor leg.

== Competition results ==
=== International competitions ===
Representing the Netherlands
Year	Competition	Venue	Position	Event	Time	Notes
2014	World Junior Championships	Eugene, United States	8th (h)	4 × 100 m relay	45.29	
2015	European Junior Championships	Eskilstuna, Sweden	4th (sf)	100 m	11.94	
2015	European Junior Championships	Eskilstuna, Sweden	6th	200 m	23.69	
2015	European Junior Championships	Eskilstuna, Sweden	– (f)	4 × 100 m relay	DNF	
2016	World Junior Championships	Bydgoszcz, Poland	3rd (sf)	200 m	23.72	
2016	World Junior Championships	Bydgoszcz, Poland	– (h)	4 × 100 m relay	DNF	
2023	European Games	Chorzów, Poland	1st	4 x 100 m relay	42.61	
2023	European Team Championships First Division	Chorzów, Poland	1st	4 x 100 m relay	42.61	
2023	World Championships	Budapest, Hungary	14th (sf)	200 m	22.67	PB
2023	World Championships	Budapest, Hungary	– (f)	4 × 100 m relay	DNF	
2024	World Relays	Nassau, Bahamas	6th	4 × 100 m relay	43.07	
2024	European Championships	Rome, Italy	5th	200 m	22.90	
2024	European Championships	Rome, Italy	3rd	4 × 100 m relay	42.46	
2024	Olympic Games	Paris, France	19th (sf)	200 m	22.81	
2024	Olympic Games	Paris, France	7th	4 × 100 m relay	42.74	
