= Abby Steiner =

American track and field athlete

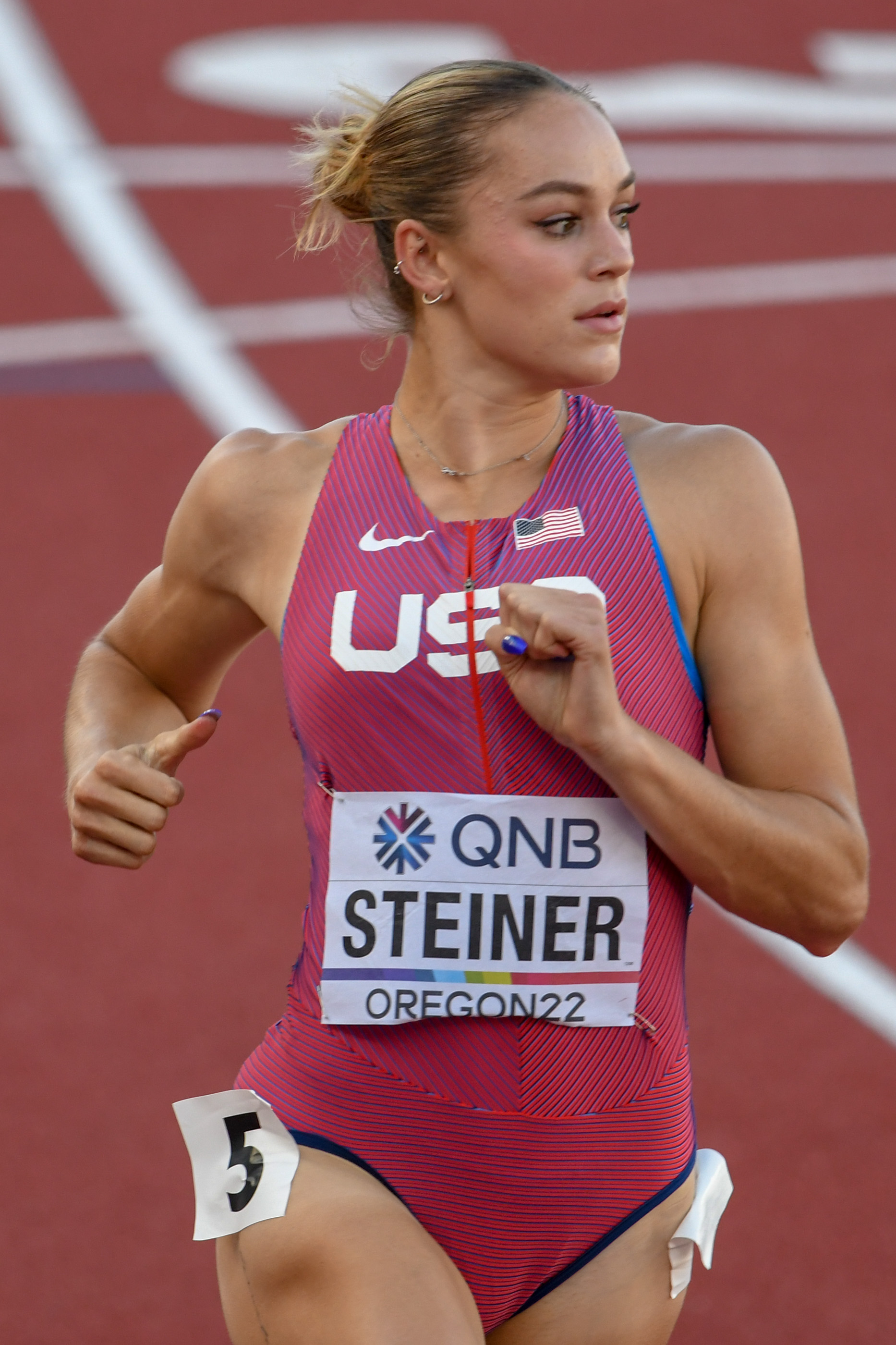
- Steiner at the 2022 World Athletics Championships

Personal information
- Born: November 24, 1999 (age 26) Dublin, Ohio, U.S.
- Height: 5 ft 6 in (168 cm)

Sport
- Country: United States
- Sport: Track and field
- Events: 60 meters 100 meters 200 meters
- College team: Kentucky
- Club: Puma
- Turned pro: 2022

Achievements and titles
- Personal bests: 100 m: 10.90 (Eugene 2022); 200 m: 21.77 (Eugene 2022); Indoors; 60 m: 7.10 (Birmingham 2022); 200 m: 22.09 NR (College Station 2022)
Medal record
Women's athletics
Representing the United States
World Championships
Gold medal – first place	2022 Eugene	4 × 100 m relay
Gold medal – first place	2022 Eugene	4 × 400 m relay
Association football career
- Position: Forward
Youth career
- Ohio Premier SC
- 2014–2017: Dublin Coffman Shamrocks
College career
Years	Team	Apps	(Gls)
2018	Kentucky Wildcats	19	(2)

Abby Kathryn Steiner (born November 24, 1999) is an American track and field sprinter. She is the U.S. indoor record holder in the 200 m and 300 m, and the NCAA record holder in the 200 m. Steiner holds personal bests of 10.90 seconds over 100 m and 21.77 seconds over 200 m. In 2022, she became a two time World Champion in the 4 × 100 m, and 4 × 400 m relays.

== Early life and development ==
Steiner grew up in the Columbus suburb of Dublin, Ohio, concentrating mainly on soccer, only starting to run track in the eighth grade. She starred in both sports at Dublin Coffman High School. Though sidelined for most of a year by a torn ACL, she was an all-state soccer player while setting four state high school records and winning 14 individual and 2 relay state championships in track. Steiner was a dual-sport scholarship athlete at the University of Kentucky (UK), starting her college career in 2018 as both a soccer player and track athlete.

After a freshman soccer season in 2018 in which she started all 19 games for UK, scoring two goals and recording five assists, Steiner left soccer to concentrate on track full-time. In a 2022 interview for the Lexington Herald-Leader, the daily newspaper of UK's home city of Lexington, Steiner cited this decision as a key to her track development:

Before, with soccer, I'd be training soccer in the fall, then I would come to track. I think really allowing myself to dive fully into the process of the periodization of training that we do, so fall training and then going into indoor and outdoor, it's all really important in developing speed and getting to where you want to be.

== Statistics ==
- Information from World Athletics profile unless otherwise noted.

=== Personal records ===
Event	Time/Mark	Wind (m/s)	Venue	Date	Notes
60 m indoor	7.10	—N/a	Birmingham, AL, U.S.	March 12, 2022	
100 m	10.90	+1.0	Hayward Field, Eugene, OR, U.S.	June 9, 2022	
200 m	21.77	-0.3	Hayward Field, Eugene, OR, U.S.	June 26, 2022	
200 m NCAA	21.80	+1.3	Hayward Field, Eugene, OR, U.S.	June 11, 2022	NCAA record
200 m indoor	22.09	—N/a	College Station, TX, U.S.	February 26, 2022	NR #2 all time
300 m indoor	35.54	—N/a	New York, NY, U.S.	February 11, 2023	NR #3 all time
400 m indoor	50.59	—N/a	Fayetteville, AR, U.S.	January 28, 2023	

=== National championships ===
Representing the Kentucky Wildcats (2018–2022)
Year	Competition	Position	Event	Time/Mark	Wind (m/s)	Venue	Notes
2019	NCAA Division I Indoor Championships	14th	200 m	23.58	—N/a	Birmingham, Alabama	
2019	NCAA Division I Indoor Championships	8th	4 × 400 m relay	3:32.89	—N/a	Birmingham, Alabama	
2019	NCAA Division I Women's Outdoor Track and Field Championships	11th	4 × 100 m	43.53	—N/a	Austin, Texas	
2019	NCAA Division I Women's Outdoor Track and Field Championships	10th	200 m	23.00	(1.3)	Austin, Texas	
2019	NCAA Division I Women's Outdoor Track and Field Championships	6th	4 × 400 m relay	3:29.13	—N/a	Austin, Texas	
2020	NCAA Division I Indoor Championships		60 m		—N/a	Albuquerque, New Mexico	
2020	NCAA Division I Indoor Championships		200 m		—N/a	Albuquerque, New Mexico	
2020	NCAA Division I Indoor Championships		4 × 400 m relay		—N/a	Albuquerque, New Mexico	
2021	NCAA Division I Indoor Championships	15th	60 m	7.38	—N/a	Fayetteville, Arkansas	
2021	NCAA Division I Indoor Championships	1st	200 m	22.38	—N/a	Fayetteville, Arkansas	CR
2021	NCAA Division I Indoor Championships	5th	4 × 400 m relay	3:30.28	—N/a	Fayetteville, Arkansas	
2022	NCAA Division I Indoor Championships	2nd	60 m	7.10	—N/a	Birmingham, Alabama	PB
2022	NCAA Division I Indoor Championships	1st	200 m	22.16	—N/a	Birmingham, Alabama	CR
2022	NCAA Division I Indoor Championships	3rd	4 × 400 m relay	3:28.77	—N/a	Birmingham, Alabama	
2022	NCAA Division I Women's Outdoor Track and Field Championships	3rd	100 m	11.08 (10.90 semi)	0.2 (1.0 semi)	Eugene, Oregon	PB (semi)
2022	NCAA Division I Women's Outdoor Track and Field Championships	1st	200 m	21.80	1.3	Eugene, Oregon	CR
2022	NCAA Division I Women's Outdoor Track and Field Championships	1st	4 × 400 m relay	3:22:55	—N/a	Eugene, Oregon	CR
2022	USA Outdoor Track and Field Championships	1st	200 m	21.77	—N/a	Eugene, Oregon	PB
2023	USA Outdoor Track and Field Championships	4th	200 m	22.07	(0.4)	Eugene, Oregon	
2024	USA Olympic Trials	6th	200 m	22.24	0.6	Eugene, Oregon	

- NCAA results from Track & Field Results Reporting System.

=== International championships ===
Representing the United States
Year	Competition	Venue	Position	Event	Time	Notes
2022	World Championships	Eugene, USA	5th	200 m	22.26	
2022	World Championships	Eugene, USA	1st	4 × 100 m relay	41.14	WL, 9.86 split
2022	World Championships	Eugene, USA	1st	4 × 400 m relay	3:17.79	WL, 49.99 split

== Other honors ==
In 2022, Steiner was named the recipient of the track and field version of the Honda Sports Award, presented annually to the most outstanding college athlete in each of 12 NCAA Division I women's sports. She also received the 2022 Southeastern Conference scholar-athlete of the year awards for both indoor and outdoor women's track. Steiner graduated from UK with a bachelor's degree in kinesiology and exercise science (an academic program housed in the UK College of Education) in May 2022. She has been accepted to UK's physical therapy program, but is deferring her enrollment to concentrate on her professional track career.

On December 15, 2022, Steiner was awarded the Bowerman Award, the annual award for the top female collegiate track and field athlete.
