= Dalia Kaddari =

Italian sprinter (born 2001)

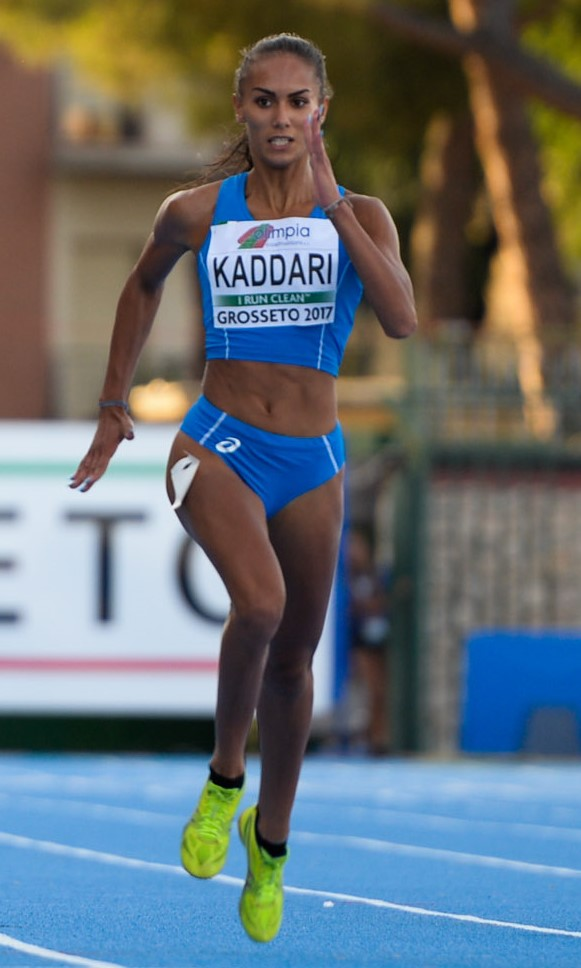
- Kaddari in 2017

Personal information
- National team: Italy (1 cap)
- Born: 23 March 2001 (age 25) Cagliari, Sardinia, Italy
- Height: 1.70 m (5 ft 7 in)
- Weight: 53 kg (117 lb)

Sport
- Sport: Athletics
- Event: Sprint
- Club: Fiamme Oro; As Tespiense Quartu
- Coached by: Fabrizio Fanni

Achievements and titles
- Personal bests: 100 m: 11.44 (2020); 200 m: 22.64 (2021)
Medal record
Representing Italy
European Championships
Bronze medal – third place	2022 Munich	4×100 m relay
European U23 Championships
Gold medal – first place	2021 Tallinn	200 m
European Team Championships
Silver medal – second place	2021 Chorzów	200 m
Youth Olympic Games
Silver medal – second place	2018 Buenos Aires	200 m

Dalia Kaddari (born 23 March 2001) is an Italian athlete sprinter who specialises in the 200 metres. She won a gold medal at the 2021 European U23 Championships. Kaddari is also a two time Italian champion in the event.

At the age of 17, Kaddari was the 2018 Youth Olympic 200 m silver medallist. She competed at the 2020 Summer Olympics, in 200 m.

== Biography ==
Kaddari was born on 23 March 2001 in Cagliari, Sardinia, to an Italian mother and Moroccan-born father.

Growing up, she set consecutive Italian records in her signature event of the 200 metres. Aged 17, she won a silver medal at the 2018 Youth Olympics in Buenos Aires with a national under-18 best time of 23.45 seconds.

In 2019–20, she set national indoor under-20 records, ultimately lowering it to 23.85 s. In August 2020, while still a junior, Kaddari took a gold medal in the outdoor event at the Italian Championships, with a personal best of 23.30 s. In September, she took 0.02 off the Italian under-20 record clocking 23.23 s in Bellinzona, Switzerland.

In May 2021, Kadari finished second at the European Team Championships, whose Super League events took place in Chorzów, Poland. She won her second Italian title in June, and the next month, she earned a gold medal at the European U23 Championships in Tallinn, Estonia.

== Statistics ==
=== International competitions ===
Representing Italy
Year	Competition	Venue	Position	Event	Time	Notes
2017	European U20 Championships	(Italy) Grosseto	SF	200 m	24.37	
2018	European U18 Championships	(Hungary) Győr	4th	200 m	23.79	
2018	Youth Olympics	(Argentina) Buenos Aires	2nd	200 m	23.45	PB NU18B
2019	European U20 Championships	(Sweden) Borås	6th	200 m	23.78	
2021	European Team Championships	(Poland) Chorzów	2nd	200 m	22.89	PB EU23L
2021	European U23 Championships	(Estonia) Tallinn	1st	200 m	22.64	PB EU23L
2021	Olympic Games	(Japan) Tokyo	23rd (sf)	200 m	23.41	
2022	World Championships	(United States) Eugene	19th (sf)	200 m	22.86	
2022	European Championships	(Germany) Munich	7th	200 m	23.19	(Note: She ran a better crono (23.06) in semifinals)
2022	European Championships	(Germany) Munich	3rd	4 × 100 m relay	42.84	

=== National titles ===
- Italian Championships
  - 200 m (2): 2020 (senior title while under-20), 2021

== See also ==
- Italian all-time lists - 200 metres
