= Daryll Neita =

British sprinter (born 1996)

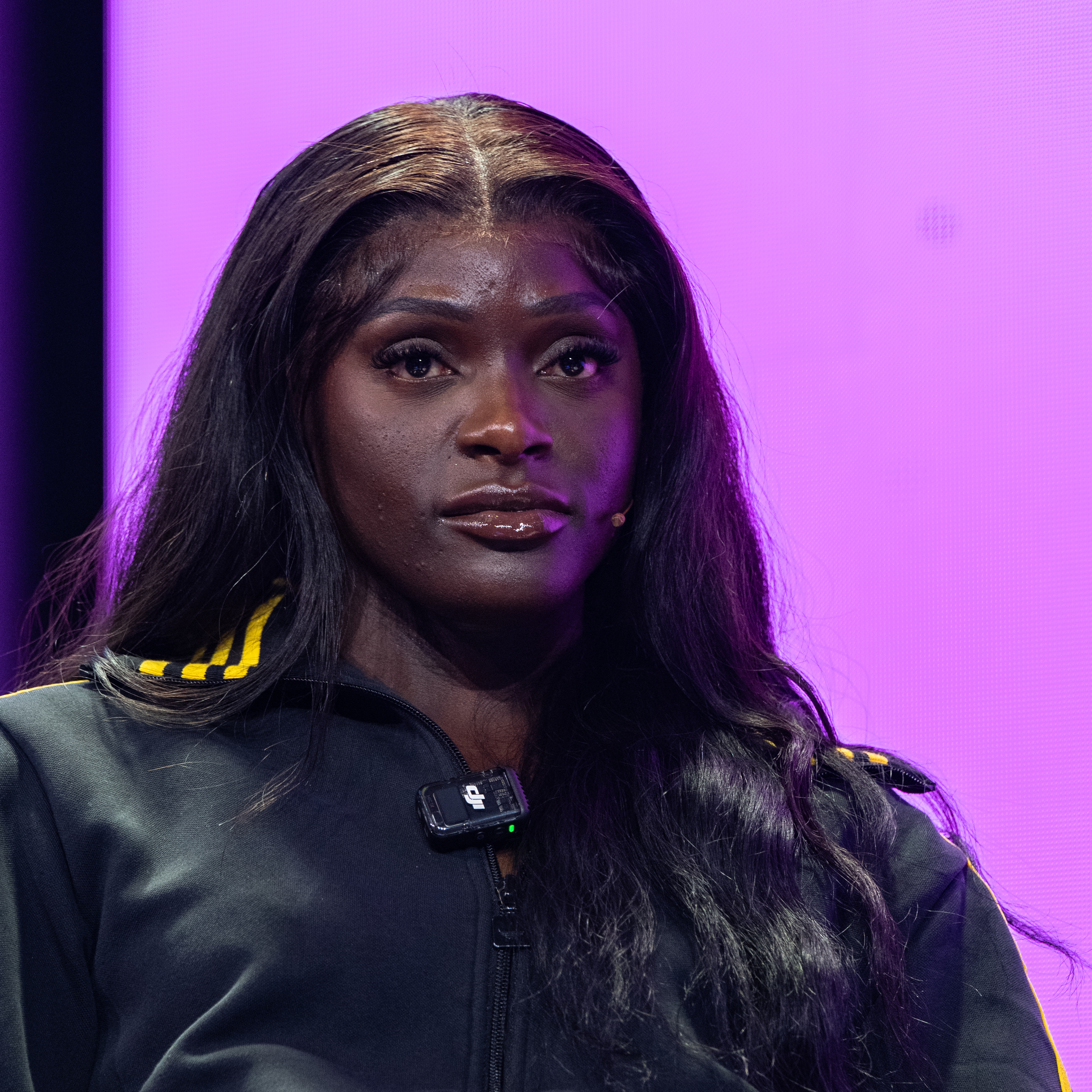
- Neita at SXSW London in 2026.

Personal information
- Nationality: British (English)
- Born: 29 August 1996 (age 30) London, England
- Height: 1.72 m (5 ft 8 in)
- Weight: 61 kg (134 lb)

Sport
- Sport: Athletics
- Events: 60 m, 100 m, 200 m
- Club: Cambridge Harriers

Achievements and titles
- Personal bests: 100 m: 10.90 (Birmingham 2022); 200 m: 22.16 (Budapest 2023); Indoors; 60 m: 7.05i (Berlin 2023)
Medal record
Women's athletics
Representing Great Britain
Olympic Games
Silver medal – second place	2024 Paris	4 × 100 m relay
Bronze medal – third place	2016 Rio de Janeiro	4 × 100 m relay
Bronze medal – third place	2020 Tokyo	4 × 100 m relay
World Championships
Silver medal – second place	2017 London	4 × 100 m relay
Silver medal – second place	2019 Doha	4 × 100 m relay
Bronze medal – third place	2023 Budapest	4 × 100 m relay
European Championships
Gold medal – first place	2018 Berlin	4 × 100 m relay
Gold medal – first place	2024 Rome	4 × 100 m relay
Silver medal – second place	2016 Amsterdam	4 × 100 m relay
Silver medal – second place	2024 Rome	200 m
Bronze medal – third place	2022 Munich	100 m
European Indoor Championships
Bronze medal – third place	2023 Istanbul	60 m
Representing England
Commonwealth Games
Gold medal – first place	2022 Birmingham	4 × 100 m relay
Bronze medal – third place	2022 Birmingham	100 m

Daryll Saskia Neita (born 29 August 1996) is a British sprinter. She won a silver medal in the 200 metres at the 2024 European Championships along with bronze in the 100 metres at the 2022 European Championships, 2022 Commonwealth Games and in the 60 metres at the 2023 European Indoor Championships. She has also won several medals as part of Great Britain 4 × 100 m relay teams, including an Olympic silver medal in 2024 and bronze medals in 2016 and 2021, World Championships silver medals in 2017 and 2019 and European gold in 2018.

She placed fourth in the 100 m at the 2024 Summer Olympics, the best performance by a British athlete in the event for 64 years. Her 60 metres indoor best of 7.05 seconds and 100 metres best of 10.90 seconds achieved at the 2023 ISTAF Indoor and 2022 Commonwealth Games respectively puts her second on the relevant UK all-time lists behind Dina Asher-Smith. Neita is a five-time British national champion, twice outdoors over 100 m, twice outdoors over 200 m, and once indoors over 60 m.

== Career ==
=== 2015–19 ===
In 2015, Neita finished fourth in the 100 metres final at the European Junior Championships with a time of 11.69 seconds.

In 2016, she finished second at the British Championships over 100 m, with a time of 11.24 seconds (having run a personal best of 11.23 in the semi-finals), earning Olympic selection. Two weeks later at the European Championships, she won a silver medal in the 4 × 100 metres relay. On 22 July, Neita and her teammates Asha Philip, Desiree Henry and Dina Asher-Smith broke the British record in the 4 × 100 metres, with 41.81 seconds. At the 2016 Rio Olympics, Neita was eliminated in the heats of the 100 metres in 11.41s, narrowly failing to qualify for the semi-finals. In the sprint relay, she won a bronze medal along with teammates Philip, Henry and Asher-Smith, improving the British record they had set a month earlier with 41.77 seconds. On winning Neita said "I am speechless. I am so proud of our team. We absolutely smashed it."

On 17 June 2017, Neita improved her 100 metres personal best to 11.20 secs at the England U23 Championships, before going on to finish second at the British Championships on 1 July, running 11.25, earning World Championship selection. A week later at the Anniversary Games in London, she further improved her 100 metres best with 11.14, to move to seventh on the UK all-time list. The following month at the World Championships in London, she ran 11.15 in her 100 metres heat to qualify for the semi-finals, where she was eliminated running 11.16. She went on to win a silver medal in the sprint relay, along with her 2016 Olympic teammates Philip, Henry and Asher-Smith.

In June 2018, Neita ran 11.19 secs to finish second at the British Championships, earning selection for the European Championships in Berlin. At the Championships she qualified for the semi finials but missed out on the final after finishing 4th in a time of 11.27.

In September 2019, Neita finished in 1st place in the 100 m, representing Europe in The Match, a two-day team competition against the US in Minsk, Belarus. At the World Championships in Doha that year, she improved her 100 metres best to 11.12 secs to reach the semi-finals, where she ran 11.18. She went on to win a silver medal in the 4 × 100 m relay.

=== 2020–present ===
In 2021, after it was announced that her coach Rana Reider was being investigated by the US Center for SafeSport for sexual misconduct, UK Athletics told Neita and other British athletes who were part of Reider's group to cease contact with Reider or else her membership in the World Class Programme, including lottery funding, would be suspended. Neita left Reider's training group thereafter. Neita finished eighth in the final of the 100 m at the Tokyo Olympics, having run a personal best of 10.96s in the heats. She won a bronze medal as part of the 4 × 100 m relay team.

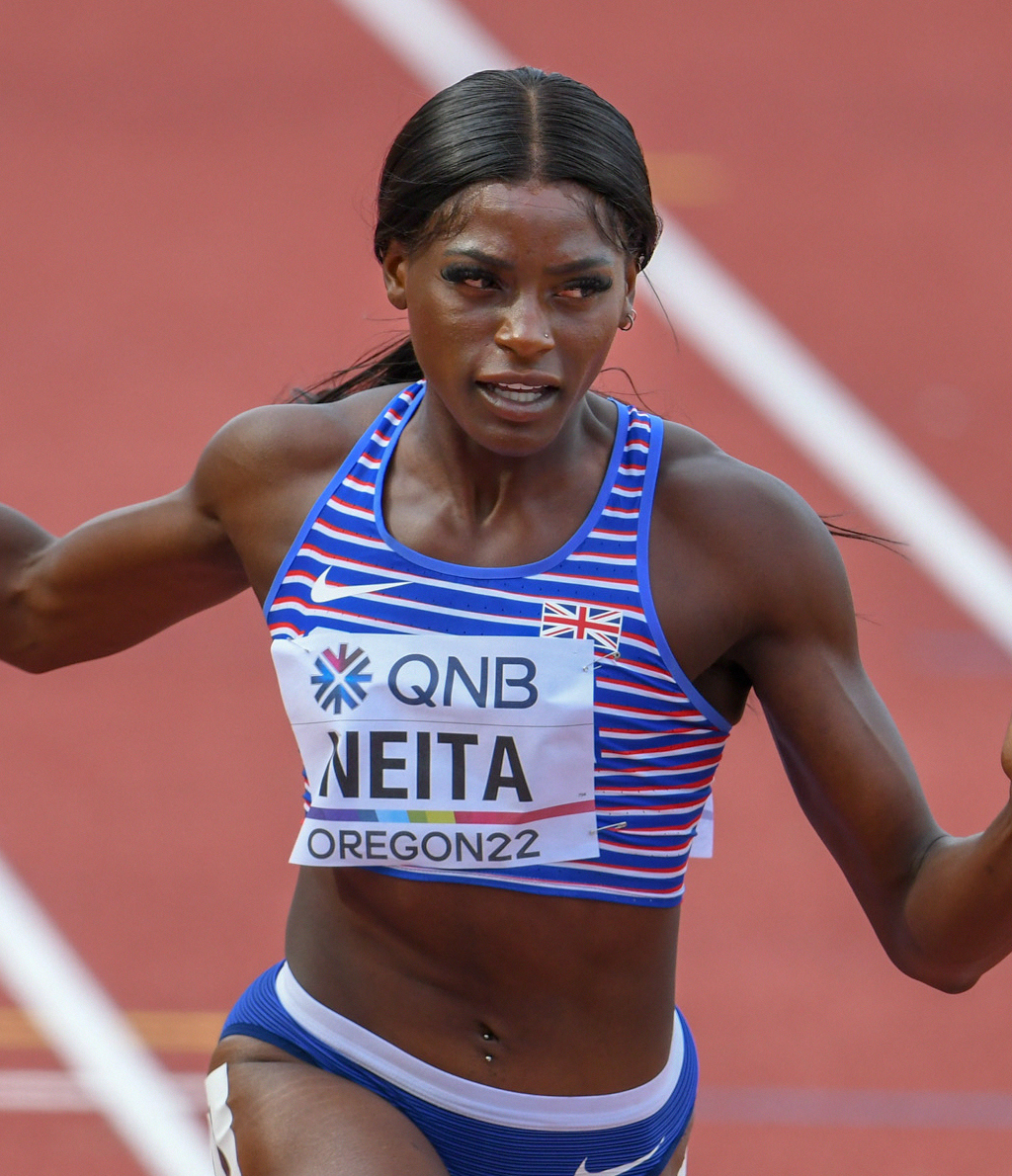
Neita competing at the 2022 World Athletics Championships.

In 2022, Neita won both the 100 m and 200 m national titles at the British Championship in June. Neita represented England at the Commonwealth Games in Birmingham, where she set a new personal best of 10.90 in the semi-finals. In the final, she ran 11.07 to finish in third place, winning a bronze medal. The same month, she took a medal of the same colour at the European Championships.

The following year, Neita won a bronze medal over 60 m at the European Indoor Championships. On 2 July, she picked up the first Diamond League win of her career by winning over 200 m at the Bauhaus-galan in Stockholm, running a time of 22.50 s. At the British Championships, she won the national 200 m title in a championship record of 22.25 s. In August, Neita competed at the World Championships in Budapest, where she was eliminated in the semi-finals of the 100 m. In the 200 m, she finished fifth in the final, running a personal best of 22.16 s. She went onto win a bronze medal in the 4 × 100 m relay, alongside teammates Asha Philip, Imani Lansiquot and Bianca Williams.

Neita won a silver medal in the 200 metres at the 2024 European Championships in Rome, Italy, with a time of 22.50s.

After winning the 100 metres gold medal at the 2024 British Athletics Championships, Neita was subsequently named in the Great Britain team for the 2024 Summer Olympics. She placed fourth in the 100 m, the best result by a British woman in 64 years in the event. Neita also placed fifth in the 200 m, and won a silver medal in the 4 × 100 m relay.

In November 2024, it was announced that Neita had signed up for the inaugural season of the Michael Johnson founded Grand Slam Track. Following the cancellation of Grand Slam Track after three meetings due to economic concerns, Neita stated "I would just hope that ultimately we're all able to get what's owed and I do believe that it will be a positive outcome, I truly do."

Neita was disqualified for a false start in the final of the 100 m at the 2025 British Championships. Despite this, she was named in the team for the 2025 World Athletics Championships, where she made the semi-finals of the 100 m and 200 m. The following year, Neita suffered a broken foot in April, affecting her preparation for the season.

== Achievements ==
=== Circuit performances ===
Grand Slam Track results
Slam	Race group	Event	Pl.	Time	Prize money
2025 Kingston Slam	Short sprints	100 m	4th	11.33	US$20,000
2025 Kingston Slam	Short sprints	200 m	5th	23.89	US$20,000
2025 Miami Slam	Short sprints	100 m	8th	11.16	US$10,000
2025 Miami Slam	Short sprints	200 m	8th	22.93	US$10,000

=== International competitions ===
Representing Great Britain
Year	Competition	Venue	Position	Event	Time
2015	European Junior Championships	Eskilstuna, Sweden	4th	100 m	11.69
2016	European Championships	Amsterdam, Netherlands	2nd	4 × 100 m relay	42.45
2016	Olympic Games	Rio de Janeiro, Brazil	25th (h)	100 m	11.41
2016	Olympic Games	Rio de Janeiro, Brazil	3rd	4 × 100 m relay	41.77
2017	World Championships	London, United Kingdom	13th (sf)	100 m	11.16
2017	World Championships	London, United Kingdom	2nd	4 × 100 m relay	42.12
2018	European Championships	Berlin, Germany	10th (sf)	100 m	11.27
2018	European Championships	Berlin, Germany	1st	4 × 100 m relay	42.19^{1}
2019	World Championships	Doha, Qatar	11th (sf)	100 m	11.18
2019	World Championships	Doha, Qatar	2nd	4 × 100 m relay	41.85
2021	Olympic Games	Tokyo, Japan	8th	100 m	11.12
2021	Olympic Games	Tokyo, Japan	3rd	4 × 100 m relay	41.88 (41.55 h NR)
2022	World Indoor Championships	Belgrade, Serbia	10th (sf)	60 m	7.15
2022	World Championships	Eugene, OR, United States	9th (sf)	100 m	10.97
2022	World Championships	Eugene, OR, United States	6th	4 × 100 m relay	42.75
2022	Commonwealth Games	Birmingham, United Kingdom	3rd	100 m	11.07 (10.90 sf PB)
2022	Commonwealth Games	Birmingham, United Kingdom	1st	4 × 100 m relay	42.41 SB
2022	European Championships	Munich, Germany	3rd	100 m	11.00 (10.95 sf)
2022	European Championships	Munich, Germany	–	200 m	DNS
2023	European Indoor Championships	Istanbul, Turkey	3rd	60 m	7.12
2023	World Championships	Budapest, Hungary	11th (sf)	100 m	11.03
2023	World Championships	Budapest, Hungary	5th	200 m	22.16
2023	World Championships	Budapest, Hungary	3rd	4 × 100 m relay	41.97
2024	European Championships	Rome, Italy	2nd	200 m	22.50
2024	European Championships	Rome, Italy	1st	4 × 100 m relay	41.91
2024	Olympic Games	Paris, France	4th	100 m	10.96
2024	Olympic Games	Paris, France	5th	200 m	22.23
2024	Olympic Games	Paris, France	2nd	4 × 100 m relay	41.85
2025	World Championships	Tokyo, Japan	10th (sf)	100 m	11.06
2025	World Championships	Tokyo, Japan	14th (sf)	200 m	22.77
2025	World Championships	Tokyo, Japan	4th	4 × 100 m relay	42.07
2026	European Championships	Birmingham, United Kingdom	19th (sf)	100 m	11.34

^{1}Time from the heats; Neita was replaced in the final.

=== National titles ===
- British Athletics Championships
  - 100 metres: 2022
  - 200 metres: 2022, 2023
- British Indoor Athletics Championships
  - 60 metres : 2023
