= Sonia Molina-Prados =

Spanish sprinter

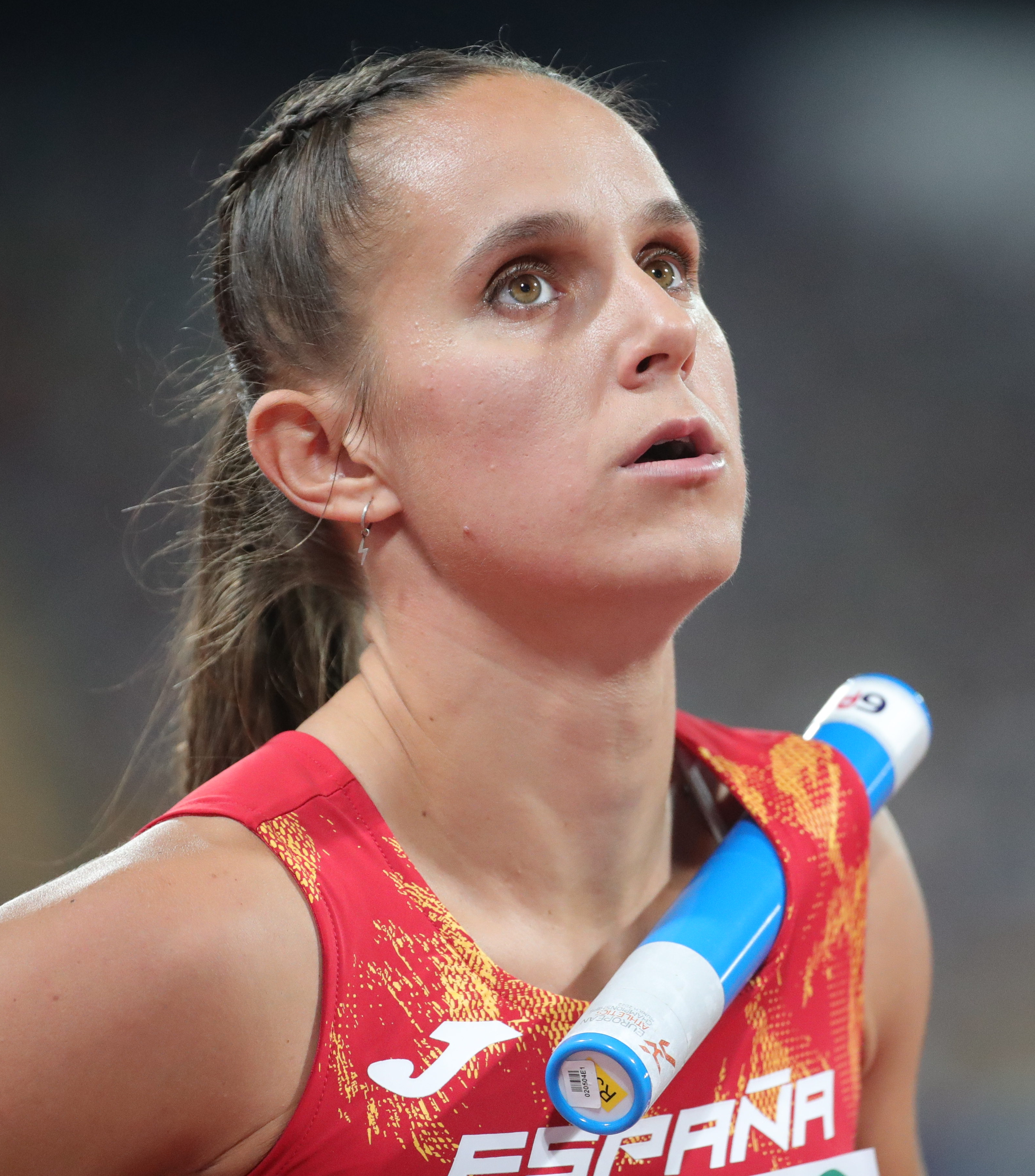
- Molina-Prados 2022 in Munich

Personal information
- Nationality: Spanish
- Born: 14 July 1993 (age 32) Manzanares, Ciudad Real, Spain
- Height: 1.73 m (5 ft 8 in)

Sport
- Sport: Track and Field
- Event(s): 100 m, 200 m

Sonia Molina-Prados (born 14 July 1993) is a Spanish track and field athlete who competes in 100 m, 200 m and 4 × 100 m relay races. She competed for Spain at the 2024 Olympic Games.

== Career ==
Molina-Prados moved from Ciudad Real in Castilla–La Mancha to train in Granada with Manola Jiménez in 2019 and she credits this move with an uplift in her performances, even though the move was hampered and disrupted by the COVID-19 pandemic. In 2022, she lowered her personal best times in both the 100 m (11.31) and 200 m (23.40). The 100 m personal best came at the 2022 Spanish national athletics championships in which she would finish runner-up to Jaël Bestué.

Molina-Prados was part of the Spanish 4 × 100 m team that finished fifth at the World Athletics Championships in Eugene, Oregon, breaking the Spanish national record. The team had initially broken the national record running 42.61 in the qualifying heats to qualify for the final. In the final the following day they lowered the national record again, to 42.58 seconds.

Molina-Prados was announced as part of the Spanish 4 × 100 m relay team for the 2022 European Athletics Championships in Munich. She also competed individually in the 100 m in Munich but did not progress past the heats running 11.64 seconds. The relay team finished fourth in the final with a time of 43.03 seconds.

She ran as part of the Spanish 4 × 100 m relay team at the 2024 World Relays Championships in Nassau, Bahamas. She was selected for the 2024 European Athletics Championships in Rome in June 2024. At the Championships, the Spanish relay team qualified for the final, and placed fifth overall.

She competed in the 4 × 100 metres relay at the 2024 Paris Olympics. At the Games, the Spanish team ran a seasons best 42.77 seconds but did not progress to the final.
