= Salomé Kora =

Swiss sprinter and bobsledder (born 1994)

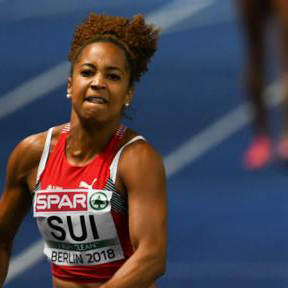
- Kora at the European Championships in 2018

Personal information
- Full name: Salomé Kpayero Kora Joseph
- Born: 8 June 1994 (age 32) St. Gallen, Switzerland

Sport
- Country: Switzerland
- Sport: Athletics; Bobsleigh
- Events: 100 metres, 4 × 100 metres relay Two-woman
Medal record
Women's athletics
Representing Switzerland
European Championships
Silver medal – second place	2026 Birmingham	4 × 100 m relay

Salomé Kora (born 8 June 1994) is a Swiss sprinter and bobsledder.

Being one of the limited number of athletes having competed in both the Summer and Winter Olympics, she competed in three Summer Olympic Games (Rio 2016, Tokyo 2020, Paris 2024), five World Athletics Championships (London 2017, Doha 2019, Eugene 2022, Budapest 2023, Tokyo 2025), and one Winter Olympic Games (Milan-Cortina 2026).

Eighteen months after competing in the 100 metres and 4 × 100 metres relay events at the 2024 Summer Olympics and five months after competing in the 100 metres and 4 × 100 metres relay events at the 2025 World Athletics Championships, she competed in the two-woman bobsleigh event at the 2026 Winter Olympics.

== Major global competitions ==
Representing Switzerland
Competition	Venue	Event	Position
2016 Summer Olympics	Rio de Janeiro	4 × 100 m relay	5th (H)
2017 World Athletics Championships	London	100 m	8th (SF)
2017 World Athletics Championships	London	4 × 100 m relay	5th (F)
2019 World Athletics Championships	Doha	100 m	6th (H)
2019 World Athletics Championships	Doha	4 × 100 m relay	4th (F)
2020 Summer Olympics	Tokyo	100 m	5th (H)
2020 Summer Olympics	Tokyo	4 × 100 m relay	4th (F)
2022 World Athletics Championships	Eugene	4 × 100 m relay	7th (F)
2023 World Athletics Championships	Budapest	100 m	6th (H)
2023 World Athletics Championships	Budapest	4 × 100 m relay	DQ (F)
2024 Summer Olympics	Paris	100 m	4th (H)
2024 Summer Olympics	Paris	4 × 100 m relay	DQ (F)
2025 World Athletics Championships	Tokyo	100 m	7th (SF)
2025 World Athletics Championships	Tokyo	4 × 100 m relay	DNF (H)
2026 Winter Olympics	Cortina d'Ampezzo	Two-woman	7th (F)

== Personal life ==
Kora was born in St. Gallen to a Beninese father and a Swiss mother.
