= Marije van Hunenstijn =

Dutch sprinter (born 1995)

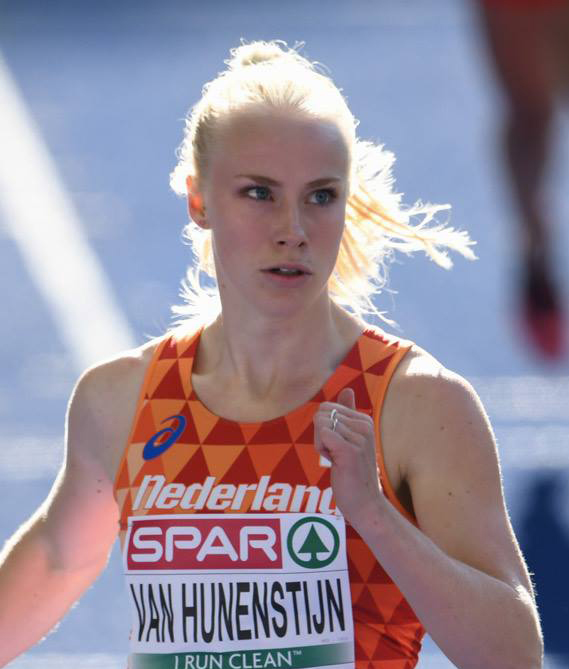
- Van Hunenstijn in 2018

Personal information
- Born: 2 March 1995 (age 31) Apeldoorn, Netherlands
- Height: 1.75 m (5 ft 9 in)

Sport
- Sport: Athletics
- Event: 100 metres
- Club: Prins Hendrik Vught
- Coached by: Bart Bennema; Betty Hofmeijer; Rogier Ummels
Medal record
Women's athletics
Representing Netherlands
European Championships
Silver medal – second place	2018 Berlin	4×100 m relay
Bronze medal – third place	2024 Rome	4×100 m relay

Marije van Hunenstijn (Dutch: [maːˈrɛiə vɑn ˈɦynə(n)stɛin]; born 2 March 1995) is a Dutch sprinter. She won a silver medal in the 4 × 100 metres relay at the 2018 European Championships.

In her youth she trained for gymnastics before turning to athletics at the age of 13.

== International competitions ==
Year	Competition	Venue	Position	Event	Notes
Representing the Netherlands
2014	World Junior Championships	Eugene, United States	44th (h)	100 m	12.14
2014	World Junior Championships	Eugene, United States	8th (h)	4 × 100 m relay	45.29
2016	European Championships	Amsterdam, Netherlands	7th (h)	4 × 100 m relay	43.34
2017	European U23Championships	Bydgoszcz, Poland	28th (h)	100 m	12.23
2018	European Championships	Berlin, Germany	21st (sf)	100 m	11.49
2018	European Championships	Berlin, Germany	2nd	4 × 100 m relay	42.15
2019	World Championships	Doha, Qatar	35th (h)	100 m	11.48
2019	World Championships	Doha, Qatar	9th (h)	4 × 100 m relay	43.01
2021	World Relays	Chorzów, Poland	1st (h)	4 × 100 m relay	43.28
2021	Olympic Games	Tokyo, Japan	24th (h)	100 m	11.27
2021	Olympic Games	Tokyo, Japan	7th (h)	4 × 100 m relay	42.81^{1}
2023	World Championships	Budapest, Hungary	6th (h)	4 × 100 m relay	42.53
2024	European Championships	Rome, Italy	3rd	4 × 100 m relay	42.46
2024	Olympic Games	Paris, France	7th	4 × 100 m relay	42.74
2025	European Indoor Championships	Apeldoorn, Netherlands	33rd (h)	60 m	7.33
2025	World Relays	Guangzhou, China	7th	4 × 100 m relay	43.21
2025	World Championships	Tokyo, Japan	29th (h)	200 m	23.13
2025	World Championships	Tokyo, Japan	10th (h)	4 × 100 m relay	43.62

^{1}Did not finish in the final

== Personal bests ==
Outdoor

- 100 metres – 11.13 (+1.9 m/s, La Chaux-de-Fonds 2019)
- 200 metres – 22.86 (+1.4 m/s, La Chaux-de-Fonds 2024)

Indoor

- 60 metres – 7.31 (Düsseldorf 2020)
