= 2022 Athletissima =

Diamond League meetings

- Dates: 26 August 2022
- Host city: Lausanne, Switzerland
- Venue: Stade Olympique de la Pontaise
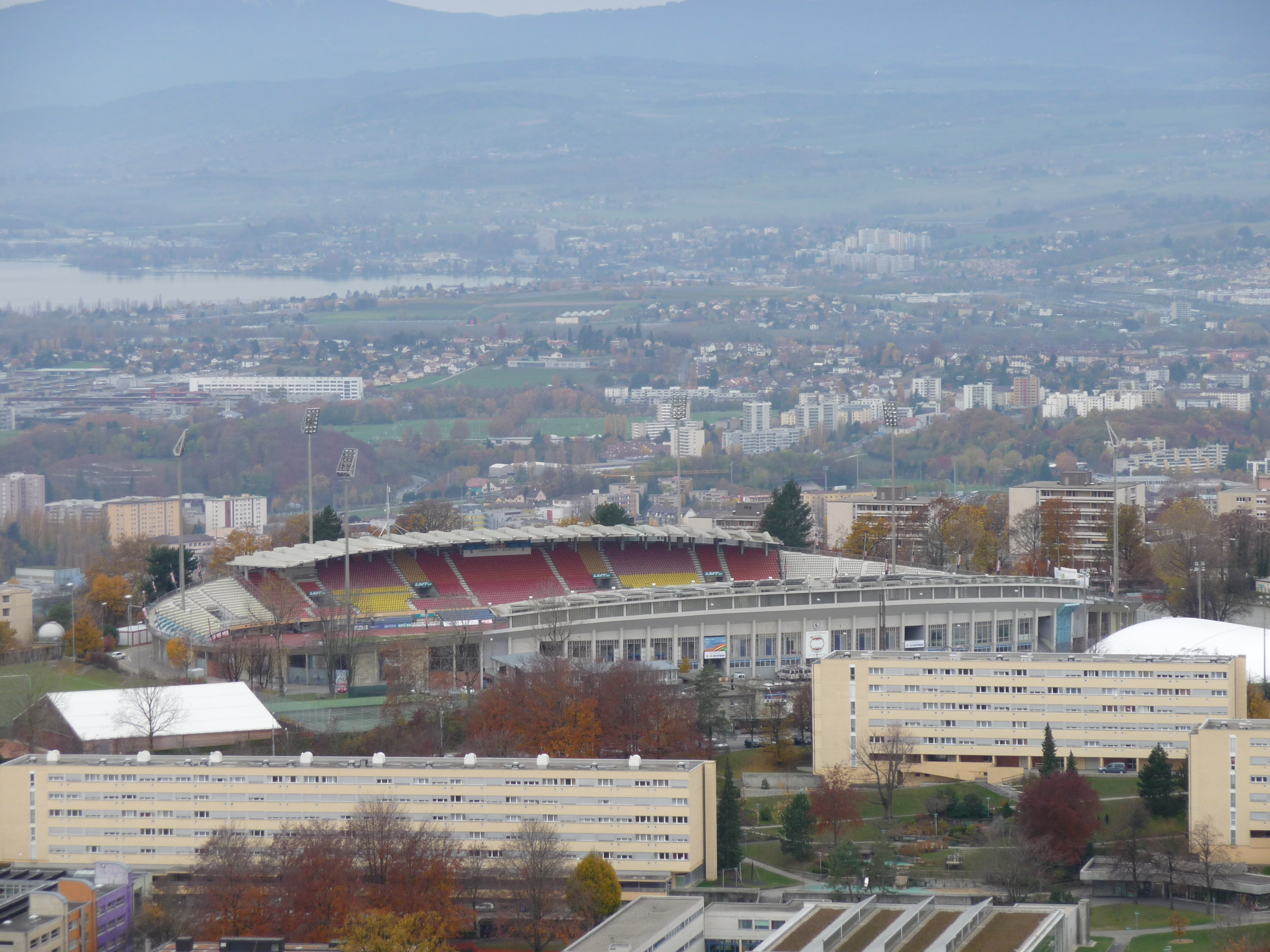
- Level: 2022 Diamond League
- Events: 15 (DL events)

The 2022 Athletissima was the 46th edition of the annual outdoor track and field meeting in Lausanne, Switzerland. Held on 26 August at the Stade Olympique de la Pontaise, it was the 11th leg of the 2022 Diamond League. The pole vault city event was held on 25 August, the day before the rest of the meeting.

== Results ==
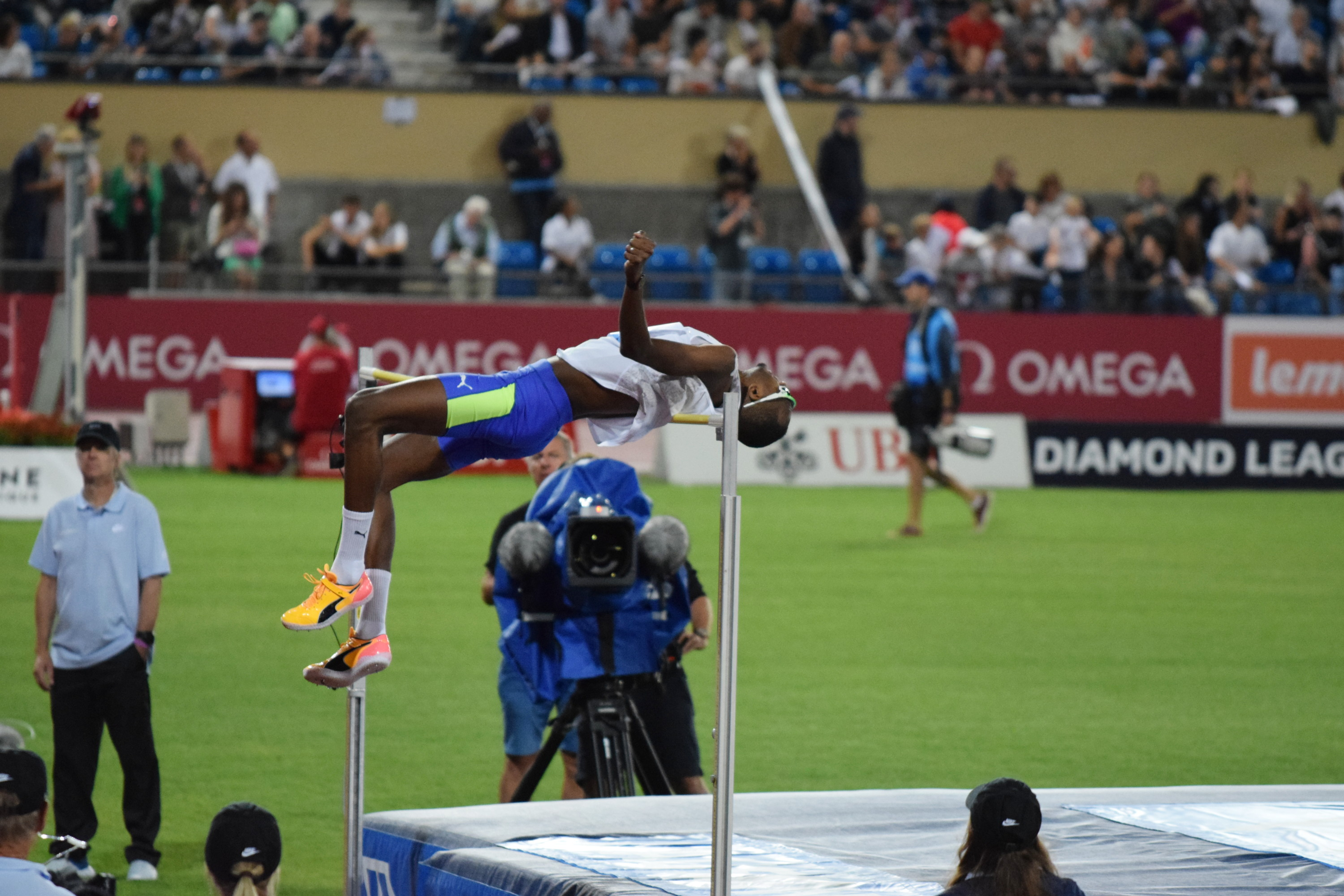
Barshim's jump in 2022 Athletissima, second place in the high jump.

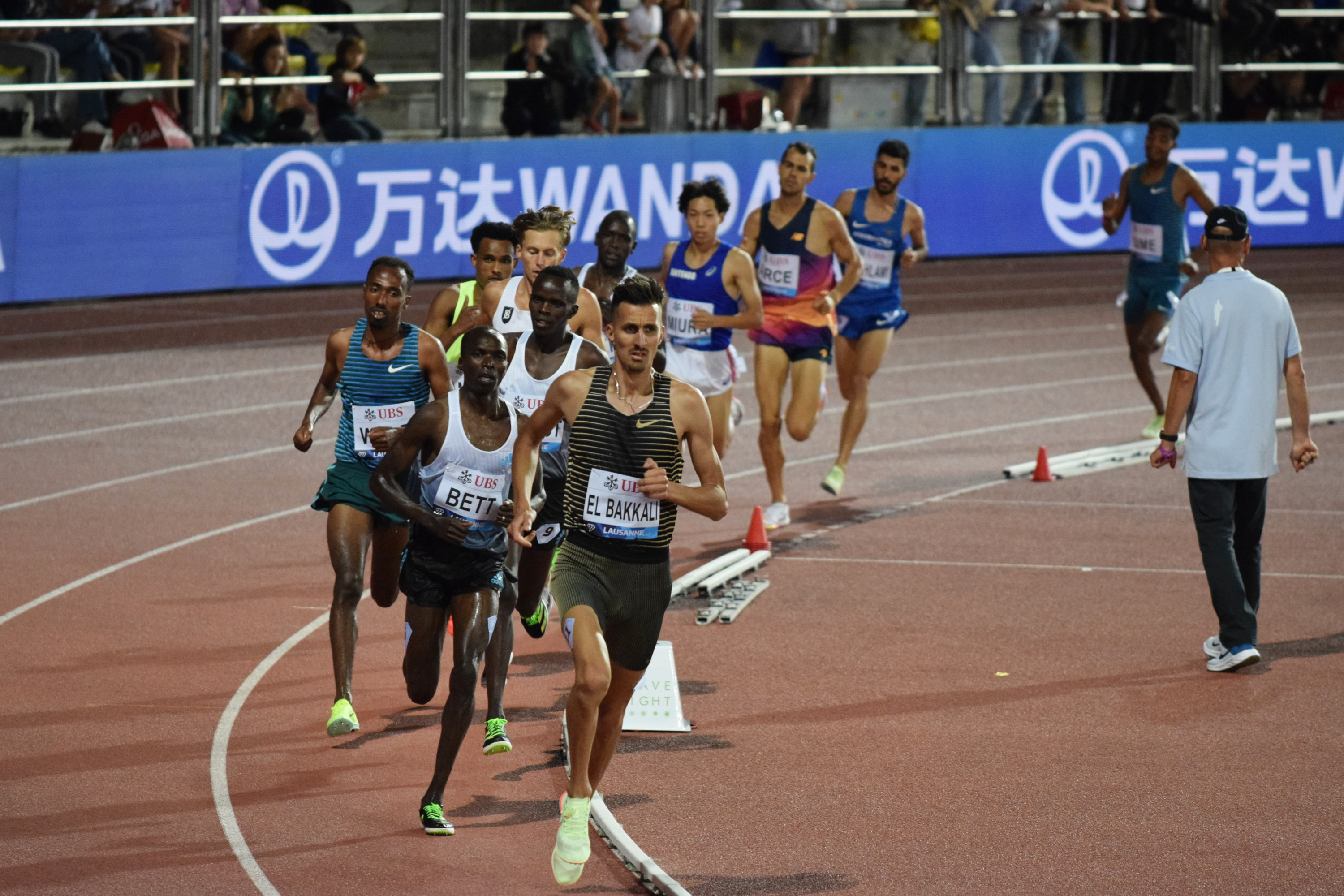
Competitors in the 3000 metres steeplechase.

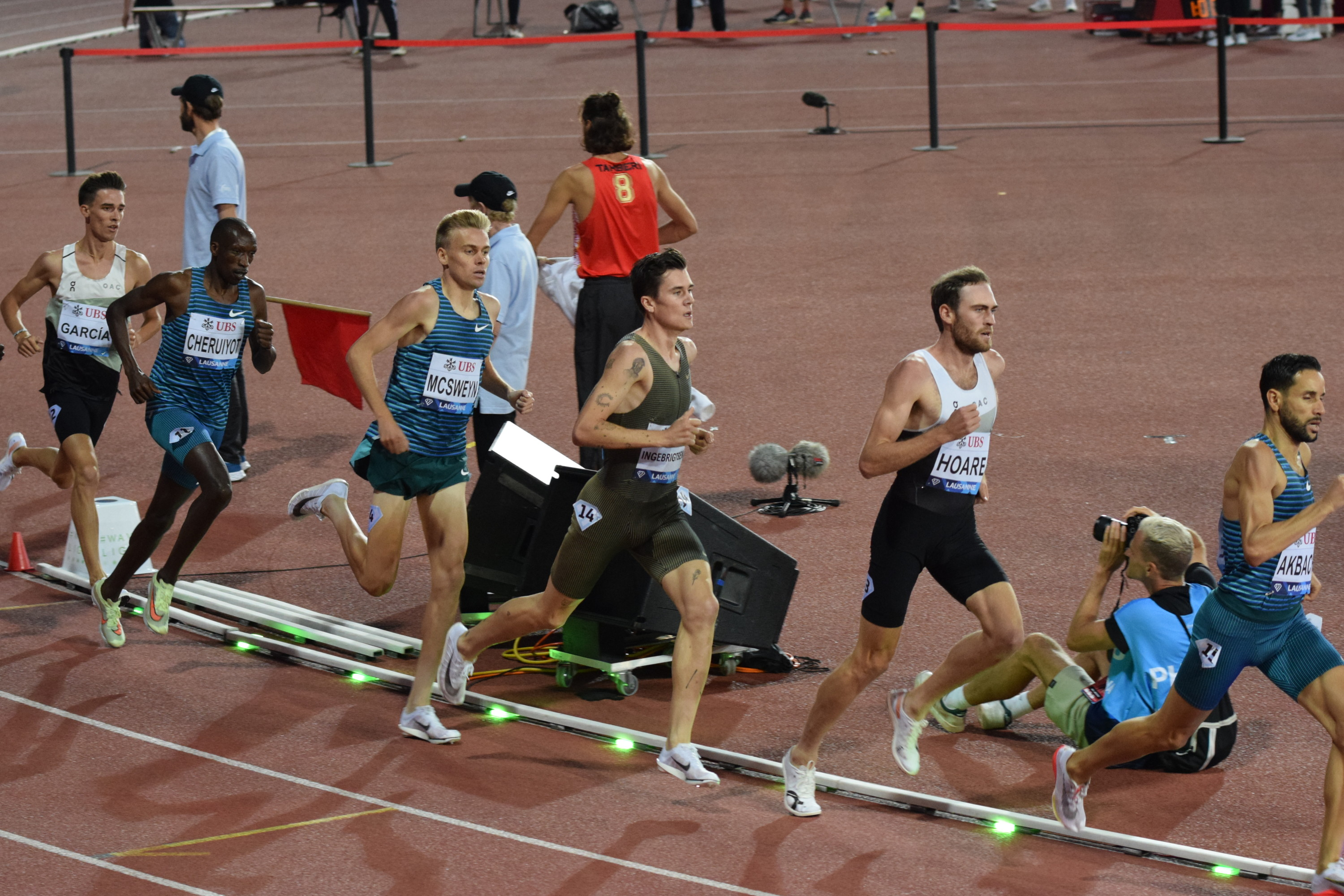
Athletes competing in the 1500 metres. The winner, Jakob Ingebrigtsen, is shown in the center.

=== Diamond Discipline ===
Men's 200m (+1.3 m/s)
Place	Athlete	Country	Time	Points
1st place, gold medalist(s)	Noah Lyles	United States	19.56	8
2nd place, silver medalist(s)	Michael Norman	United States	19.76	7
3rd place, bronze medalist(s)	Jereem Richards	Trinidad and Tobago	19.95	6
4	Alexander Ogando	Dominican Republic	20.09	5
5	Andrew Hudson	Jamaica	20.09	4
6	Erriyon Knighton	United States	20.13	3
7	Joseph Fahnbulleh	Liberia	20.33	2
8	Charlie Dobson	Great Britain	20.34	1

Men's 1500m
Place	Athlete	Country	Time	Points
1st place, gold medalist(s)	Jakob Ingebrigtsen	Norway	3:29.05	8
2nd place, silver medalist(s)	Abel Kipsang	Kenya	3:29.93	7
3rd place, bronze medalist(s)	Stewart McSweyn	Australia	3:30.18	6
4	Josh Kerr	Great Britain	3:32.28	5
5	Michał Rozmys	Poland	3:32.43	4
6	Mario García	Spain	3:32.71	3
7	Timothy Cheruiyot	Kenya	3:32.91	2
8	Sam Tanner	New Zealand	3:33.67	1
9	Jake Heyward	Great Britain	3:34.99	
10	Matthew Stonier	Great Britain	3:35.57	
11	Abdelatif Sadiki	Morocco	3:37.41	
12	Ollie Hoare	Australia	3:37.81	
13	Gonzalo García	Spain	3:38.64	
14	Neil Gourley	Great Britain	3:53.67	
	Mounir Akbache	France	DNF	

Men's 110mH (±0.0 m/s)
Place	Athlete	Country	Time	Points
1st place, gold medalist(s)	Rasheed Broadbell	Jamaica	12.99	8
2nd place, silver medalist(s)	Trey Cunningham	United States	13.10	7
3rd place, bronze medalist(s)	Grant Holloway	United States	13.11	6
4	Hansle Parchment	Jamaica	13.13	5
5	Rafael Pereira	Brazil	13.49	4
6	Damian Czykier	Poland	13.58	3
7	Pascal Martinot-Lagarde	France	13.58	2
8	Jason Joseph	Switzerland	13.66	1

Men's 3000mSC
Place	Athlete	Country	Time	Points
1st place, gold medalist(s)	Soufiane El Bakkali	Morocco	8:02.45	8
2nd place, silver medalist(s)	Hailemariyam Amare	Ethiopia	8:12.07	7
3rd place, bronze medalist(s)	Leonard Bett	Kenya	8:12.08	6
4	Ryuji Miura	Japan	8:13.06	5
5	Amos Serem	Kenya	8:13.93	4
6	Abraham Kibiwot	Kenya	8:15.69	3
7	Getnet Wale	Ethiopia	8:16.41	2
8	Evan Jager	United States	8:16.99	1
9	Abrham Sime	Ethiopia	8:25.06	
10	Osama Zoghlami	Italy	8:25.63	
11	Daniel Arce	Spain	8:26.98	
	Wilberforce Chemiat Kones	Kenya	DNF	
	Lawrence Kemboi	Kenya	DNF	

Men's High Jump
Place	Athlete	Country	Mark	Points
1st place, gold medalist(s)	Andriy Protsenko	Ukraine	2.24 m	8
2nd place, silver medalist(s)	Mutaz Essa Barshim	Qatar	2.24 m	7
3rd place, bronze medalist(s)	JuVaughn Harrison	United States	2.24 m	6
4	Hamish Kerr	New Zealand	2.24 m	5
5	Gianmarco Tamberi	Italy	2.20 m	4
6	Django Lovett	Canada	2.20 m	3
7	Mateusz Przybylko	Germany	2.20 m	2
8	Woo Sang-hyeok	South Korea	2.15 m	1
9	Shelby McEwen	United States	2.15 m	

Men's Triple Jump
Place	Athlete	Country	Mark	Points
1st place, gold medalist(s)	Andy Díaz	Cuba	17.67 m (−0.6 m/s)	8
2nd place, silver medalist(s)	Lázaro Martínez	Cuba	17.50 m (−0.3 m/s)	7
3rd place, bronze medalist(s)	Jordan Díaz	Cuba	17.44 m (±0.0 m/s)	6
4	Hugues Fabrice Zango	Burkina Faso	17.07 m (−0.5 m/s)	5
5	Almir dos Santos	Brazil	16.84 m (+0.8 m/s)	4
6	Donald Scott	United States	16.81 m (−0.6 m/s)	3
7	Christian Taylor	United States	16.45 m (−0.1 m/s)	2
8	Jean-Marc Pontvianne	France	16.11 m (−0.2 m/s)	1

Men's Shot Put
Place	Athlete	Country	Mark	Points
1st place, gold medalist(s)	Joe Kovacs	United States	22.65 m	8
2nd place, silver medalist(s)	Ryan Crouser	United States	22.05 m	7
3rd place, bronze medalist(s)	Jacko Gill	New Zealand	21.70 m	6
4	Armin Sinančević	Serbia	21.65 m	5
5	Tom Walsh	New Zealand	21.30 m	4
6	Josh Awotunde	United States	21.22 m	3
7	Nick Ponzio	Italy	20.94 m	2
8	Filip Mihaljević	Croatia	20.91 m	1

Men's Javelin Throw
Place	Athlete	Country	Mark	Points
1st place, gold medalist(s)	Neeraj Chopra	India	89.08 m	8
2nd place, silver medalist(s)	Jakub Vadlejch	Czech Republic	85.88 m	7
3rd place, bronze medalist(s)	Curtis Thompson	United States	83.72 m	6
4	Keshorn Walcott	Trinidad and Tobago	83.38 m	5
5	Lassi Etelätalo	Finland	80.17 m	4
6	Patriks Gailums	Latvia	79.71 m	3
7	Toni Keränen	Finland	77.18 m	2
8	Gatis Čakšs	Latvia	74.50 m	1

Women's 100m (±0.0 m/s)
Place	Athlete	Country	Time	Points
1st place, gold medalist(s)	Aleia Hobbs	United States	10.87	8
2nd place, silver medalist(s)	Shericka Jackson	Jamaica	10.88	7
3rd place, bronze medalist(s)	Marie-Josée Ta Lou	Ivory Coast	10.89	6
4	Tamari Davis	United States	10.94	5
5	Twanisha Terry	United States	11.13	4
6	Mujinga Kambundji	Switzerland	11.15	3
7	N'Ketia Seedo	Netherlands	11.41	2
	Elaine Thompson-Herah	Jamaica	DQ	

Women's 400m
Place	Athlete	Country	Time	Points
1st place, gold medalist(s)	Marileidy Paulino	Dominican Republic	49.87	8
2nd place, silver medalist(s)	Sada Williams	Barbados	49.94	7
3rd place, bronze medalist(s)	Fiordaliza Cofil	Dominican Republic	50.13	6
4	Candice McLeod	Jamaica	50.80	5
5	Natalia Kaczmarek	Poland	51.03	4
6	Lieke Klaver	Netherlands	51.15	3
7	Stephenie Ann McPherson	Jamaica	51.63	2
8	Jodie Williams	Great Britain	52.31	1

Women's 3000m
Place	Athlete	Country	Time	Points
1st place, gold medalist(s)	Francine Niyonsaba	Burundi	8:26.80	8
2nd place, silver medalist(s)	Alicia Monson	United States	8:26.81	7
3rd place, bronze medalist(s)	Beatrice Chebet	Kenya	8:27.14	6
4	Sifan Hassan	Netherlands	8:28.28	5
5	Margaret Kipkemboi	Kenya	8:29.05	4
6	Elise Cranny	United States	8:29.95	3
7	Laura Muir	Great Britain	8:30.53	2
8	Caroline Chepkoech Kipkirui	Kazakhstan	8:34.65	1
9	Fantu Worku	Ethiopia	8:35.55	
10	Hawi Feysa	Ethiopia	8:38.48	
11	Jessica Hull	Australia	8:41.52	
12	Konstanze Klosterhalfen	Germany	8:45.36	
13	Axumawit Embaye	Ethiopia	8:45.54	
14	Elly Henes	United States	8:46.42	
15	Josette Andrews	United States	8:50.49	
	Georgia Griffith	Australia	DNF	
	Aneta Lemiesz	Poland	DNF	

Women's 100mH (−0.9 m/s)
Place	Athlete	Country	Time	Points
1st place, gold medalist(s)	Jasmine Camacho-Quinn	Puerto Rico	12.34	8
2nd place, silver medalist(s)	Tobi Amusan	Nigeria	12.45	7
3rd place, bronze medalist(s)	Tia Jones	United States	12.47	6
4	Nia Ali	United States	12.59	5
5	Britany Anderson	Jamaica	12.59	4
6	Kendra Harrison	United States	12.59	3
7	Nadine Visser	Netherlands	12.81	2
8	Ditaji Kambundji	Switzerland	12.83	1

Women's 400mH
Place	Athlete	Country	Time	Points
1st place, gold medalist(s)	Femke Bol	Netherlands	52.95	8
2nd place, silver medalist(s)	Janieve Russell	Jamaica	53.92	7
3rd place, bronze medalist(s)	Andrenette Knight	Jamaica	54.33	6
4	Anna Ryzhykova	Ukraine	54.59	5
5	Gianna Woodruff	Panama	54.97	4
6	Viktoriya Tkachuk	Ukraine	55.29	3
7	Dalilah Muhammad	United States	56.03	2
	Rushell Clayton	Jamaica	DNF	

Women's Pole Vault
Place	Athlete	Country	Mark	Points
1st place, gold medalist(s)	Tina Šutej	Slovenia	4.70 m	8
2nd place, silver medalist(s)	Nina Kennedy	Australia	4.70 m	7
3rd place, bronze medalist(s)	Wilma Murto	Finland	4.60 m	6
4	Roberta Bruni	Italy	4.60 m	5
5	Angelica Moser	Switzerland	4.50 m	4
6	Katerina Stefanidi	Greece	4.50 m	3
7	Caroline Bonde Holm	Denmark	4.35 m	2
8	Lene Retzius	Norway	4.35 m	1
	Margot Chevrier	France	NM	

Women's Triple Jump
Place	Athlete	Country	Mark	Points
1st place, gold medalist(s)	Yulimar Rojas	Venezuela	15.31 m (−0.2 m/s)	8
2nd place, silver medalist(s)	Shanieka Ricketts	Jamaica	14.64 m (+0.4 m/s)	7
3rd place, bronze medalist(s)	Maryna Bekh-Romanchuk	Ukraine	14.31 m (−0.2 m/s)	6
4	Patrícia Mamona	Portugal	14.22 m (+0.1 m/s)	5
5	Tori Franklin	United States	14.21 m (−0.4 m/s)	4
6	Kimberly Williams	Jamaica	14.12 m (−0.2 m/s)	3
7	Kristiina Mäkelä	Finland	13.99 m (+0.5 m/s)	2
8	Hanna Knyazyeva-Minenko	Israel	13.98 m (−0.4 m/s)	1
9	Thea LaFond	Dominica	13.85 m (−0.7 m/s)	

=== National Events ===
Men's 800m
Place	Athlete	Country	Time
1st place, gold medalist(s)	George Mills	Great Britain	1:46.74
2nd place, silver medalist(s)	Tom Elmer	Switzerland	1:47.44
3rd place, bronze medalist(s)	Robin Oester	Switzerland	1:48.06
4	Ivan Pelizza	Switzerland	1:49.06
5	Ramon Wipfli	Switzerland	1:49.33
6	Louis Low-Beer	Switzerland	1:50.04
7	Vincent Notz	Switzerland	1:50.53
8	Victor Amiot	France	1:51.76
9	Diego Klopfenstein	Switzerland	1:54.50
	Khalid Benmahdi	Algeria	DNF

Women's 100m
Place	Athlete	Country	Time	Heat
1st place, gold medalist(s)	N'Ketia Seedo	Netherlands	11.28	1
2nd place, silver medalist(s)	Zoë Sedney	Netherlands	11.43	1
3rd place, bronze medalist(s)	Salomé Kora	Switzerland	11.46	1
4	Géraldine Frey	Switzerland	11.50	1
5	Hélène Parisot	France	11.54	3
6	Jamile Samuel	Netherlands	11.56	2
7	Mallory Leconte	France	11.58	1
8	Minke Bisschops	Netherlands	11.66	3
9	Floriane Gnafoua	France	11.67	2
10	Lena Weiss	Switzerland	11.74	3
11	Magdalena Lindner	Austria	11.75	2
12	Soraya Becerra	Switzerland	11.78	3
13	Emma van Camp	Switzerland	11.80	3
14	Nathacha Kouni	Switzerland	11.81	1
15	Naomi Sedney	Netherlands	11.82	2
16	Mélissa Gutschmidt	Switzerland	11.82	2
17	Gémima Joseph	France	11.87	2
18	Wided Atatou	France	12.04	3
19	Manon Berclaz	Switzerland	12.39	3

Women's 200m (−0.9 m/s)
Place	Athlete	Country	Time
1st place, gold medalist(s)	Léonie Pointet	Switzerland	23.30
2nd place, silver medalist(s)	Julia Niederberger	Switzerland	23.49
3rd place, bronze medalist(s)	Sarah Atcho	Switzerland	23.77
4	Céline Bürgi	Switzerland	23.91
5	Selina Furler	Switzerland	24.18
6	Cornelia Halbheer	Switzerland	24.22
7	Coralie Ambrosini	Switzerland	24.27
8	Iris Caligiuri	Switzerland	24.39

Women's 400m
Place	Athlete	Country	Time
1st place, gold medalist(s)	Yasmin Giger	Switzerland	52.42
2nd place, silver medalist(s)	Annina Fahr	Switzerland	52.91
3rd place, bronze medalist(s)	Silke Lemmens	Switzerland	53.14
4	Rachel Pellaud	Switzerland	53.47
5	Sarah King	Switzerland	54.00
6	Michelle Gröbli	Switzerland	54.09
7	Noémie Salamin	Switzerland	55.35
8	Alizée Rusca	Switzerland	55.88

=== Promotional Events ===
Men's Pole Vault
Place	Athlete	Country	Mark
1st place, gold medalist(s)	Armand Duplantis	Sweden	6.10 m
2nd place, silver medalist(s)	Chris Nilsen	United States	5.80 m
3rd place, bronze medalist(s)	EJ Obiena	Philippines	5.80 m
4	Sondre Guttormsen	Norway	5.80 m
5	Ben Broeders	Belgium	5.70 m
6	Thibaut Collet	France	5.60 m
7	Anthony Ammirati	France	5.60 m
8	Renaud Lavillenie	France	5.40 m
9	Valentin Lavillenie	France	5.40 m
10	Dominik Alberto	Switzerland	5.40 m

Women's 800m
Place	Athlete	Country	Time
1st place, gold medalist(s)	Rénelle Lamote	France	1:57.84
2nd place, silver medalist(s)	Allie Wilson	United States	1:58.09
3rd place, bronze medalist(s)	Jemma Reekie	Great Britain	1:59.00
4	Halimah Nakaayi	Uganda	1:59.73
5	Audrey Werro	Switzerland	1:59.87
6	Sinclaire Johnson	United States	1:59.90
7	Anna Wielgosz	Poland	2:00.07
8	Lore Hoffmann	Switzerland	2:00.08
9	Gabriela Gajanová	Slovakia	2:00.82
10	Anita Horvat	Slovenia	2:02.20
11	Valentina Rosamilia	Switzerland	2:04.46
	Jackie Baumann	Germany	DNF

Men's 400mH
Place	Athlete	Country	Time
1st place, gold medalist(s)	Khallifah Rosser	United States	47.68
2nd place, silver medalist(s)	Wilfried Happio	France	48.66
3rd place, bronze medalist(s)	Ludvy Vaillant	France	48.94
4	Julien Bonvin	Switzerland	49.65
5	Victor Coroller	France	49.91
6	Dany Brand	Switzerland	50.87
7	Mattia Tajana	Switzerland	51.17
8	Alain-Hervé Mfomkpa	Switzerland	52.04

Women's 4x100m
Place	Athlete	Country	Time
1st place, gold medalist(s)	Géraldine Frey; Mujinga Kambundji; Salomé Kora; Ajla Del Ponte	Switzerland	42.91
2nd place, silver medalist(s)	N'Ketia Seedo; Lieke Klaver; Jamile Samuel; Naomi Sedney	Netherlands	43.02
3rd place, bronze medalist(s)	Sonia Molina-Prados; Jaël Bestué; Lucía Carrillo; Carmen Marco	Spain	43.75
4	Johanna Plank; Susanne Gogl-Walli; Magdalena Lindner; Viktoria Willhuber	Austria	44.66
5	Soraya Becerra; Emma van Camp; Selina Furler; Iris Caligiuri	Switzerland	45.09
	Floriane Gnafoua; Wided Atatou; Hélène Parisot; Mallory Leconte	France	DNF
