= 2023 World Athletics Championships – Women's 4 × 100 metres relay =

Women's 4 × 100 metres relay at the 2023 World Championships
- Venue: National Athletics Centre
- Dates: 25 August (heats); 26 August (final)
- Nations: 17
- Winning time: 41.03 CR

Medalists
gold medal	Tamari Davis; Twanisha Terry; Gabrielle Thomas; Sha'Carri Richardson; Melissa Jefferson*; Tamara Clark*	United States
silver medal	Natasha Morrison; Shelly-Ann Fraser-Pryce; Shashalee Forbes; Shericka Jackson; Briana Williams*; Elaine Thompson-Herah*	Jamaica
bronze medal	Asha Philip; Imani Lansiquot; Bianca Williams; Daryll Neita; Annie Tagoe*	Great Britain

The women's 4 × 100 metres relay at the 2023 World Athletics Championships was held at the National Athletics Centre in Budapest on 24 and 25 August 2023.

== Summary ==
Jamaica had all of three 2022 World Championships 100m medalists, but double Olympic Gold Medalist Elaine Thompson-Herah ran in the heats and was replaced by 200 metre gold medalist Shericka Jackson in the final. The USA replaced Tamara Clark and Melissa Jefferson with 200 metre silver medalist Gabby Thomas and 100 metre gold medalist Sha'Carri Richardson.

Côte d'Ivoire set an African record of 41.90 in the heats.

In the final, out of the blocks, USA's Tamari Davis gained against the stagger of Jamaica's Natasha Morrison who in turn was gaining on GBR's Asha Philip. USA passed first to Twanisha Terry. Jamaica passed late to their fifteen time World Championship medalist Shelly-Ann Fraser-Pryce who recaptured some of the distance lost, passing GBR's Imani-Lara Lansiquot down the backstretch. USA and Jamaica passed virtually together, but that meant USA in the inside had the advantage. This exchange was a disaster for Côte d'Ivoire as Marie-Josée Ta Lou tripped over Jessika Gbai, both athletes crashing to the track. Thomas brought USA around the turn ahead of Jamaica's Shashalee Forbes, only GBR with Bianca Williams and the Netherlands with Nadine Visser still battling for the bronze. Tasa Jiya started running too early, never connecting with Visser and GBR had clear sailing to bronze. Richardson got the baton for USA two metres up on Jamaica's Jackson. The United States was clear to win with Jamaica two metres back and GBR's Daryll Neita 10 metres back. The winning time of 41.03 took down Jamaica's Championships Record and was the fourth best time ever run, the third best by an American squad. Jamaica's 41.21 was number 8 on that same all-time list, the fourth best by a Jamaican squad.

== Records ==
Before the competition records were as follows:

Record	Athlete & Nat.	Perf.	Location	Date
World record	United States; Tianna Madison, Allyson Felix, Bianca Knight, Carmelita Jeter	40.82	London, United Kingdom	10 August 2012
Championship record	Jamaica; Veronica Campbell-Brown, Natasha Morrison, Elaine Thompson, Shelly-Ann Fraser-Pryce	41.07	Beijing, China	29 August 2015
World Leading	University of Texas; Julien Alfred, Ezinne Abba, Rhasidat Adeleke, Kevona Davis	41.55	Austin, United States	8 June 2023
African Record	Nigeria; Joy Chinenye Udo-Gabriel, Favour Ofili, Rosemary Chukwuma, Nzubechi Grace Nwokocha	42.22	Eugene, United States	23 July 2022
Asian Record	(China) Sichuan; Lin Xiao, Li Yali, Liu Xiaomei, Li Xuemei	42.23	Shanghai, China	23 October 1997
North, Central American and Caribbean record	United States; Tianna Madison, Allyson Felix, Bianca Knight, Carmelita Jeter	40.82	London, United Kingdom	10 August 2012
South American Record	Brazil; Evelyn dos Santos, Ana Claudia Lemos, Franciela Krasucki, Rosângela Santos	42.29	Moscow, Russia	18 August 2013
European Record	East Germany; Silke Möller, Sabine Rieger, Ingrid Auerswald, Marlies Göhr	41.37	Canberra, Australia	6 October 1985
Oceanian record	Australia; Rachael Massey, Suzanne Broadrick, Melinda Gainsford-Taylor, Jodi Lambert	42.99	Pietersburg, South Africa	18 March 2000

== Qualification standard ==
After the postponement for COVID-19 pandemic reasons of the 2023 World Relays to 2024 Nassau, the modified system to qualify automatically is to have finished in the first eight (finalists) at 2022 World Championships, in Eugene, completed by eight more 2022-2023 top lists' teams.

The top 8 from the 2022 World Athletics Championships:

- United States (1st)
- Jamaica (2nd)
- Germany (3rd)
- Nigeria (4th)
- Spain (5th)
- Great Britain & N.I. (6th)
- Switzerland (7th)
- Italy (8th)

Top list before the 30 July 2023:

- 42.23 Ivory Coast Stade Olympique de la Pontaise, Lausanne (SUI) - 30 June 2023
- 42.38 Netherlands Olympic Stadium, London (GBR) - 23 July 2023
- 42.61 Poland Olympiastadion, München (GER) - 21 August 2022
- 43.16 Australia Alexander Stadium, Birmingham (GBR) - 7 August 2022
- 43.17 Cuba San Salvador (ESA) - 6 July 2023
- 43.24 France Olympiastadion, München (GER) - 19 August 2022
- 43.34 Bahamas Grand Bahama Sports Complex, Freeport (BAH) - 21 AUG 2022 Not entered (was Next best by Top List)
- 43.35 China Central Stadium, Almaty (KAZ) - 01 JUL 2023 Not entered (was Next best by Top List)
- 43.43 Trinidad and Tobago 43.43 - San Salvador (ESA) - 6 July 2023
- 43.45 Dominican Republic 43.45 - San Salvador (ESA) - 06 JUL 2023 Not entered (was Next best by Top List)
- 43.47 Brazil COTP Stadium, São Paulo (BRA) - 29 July 2023

== Schedule ==
The event schedule, in local time (UTC+2), was as follows:

Date	Time	Round
25 August	20:00	Heats
26 August	21:53	Final

== Results ==
=== Heats ===
The first three in each heat (Q) and the next two fastest (q) qualified for the final.

Rank	Heat	Lane	Nation	Athletes	Time	Notes
1	2	6	United States	Tamari Davis, Twanisha Terry, Tamara Clark, Melissa Jefferson	41.59	Q, SB
2	1	2	Jamaica	Briana Williams, Elaine Thompson-Herah, Shashalee Forbes, Shelly-Ann Fraser-Pryce	41.70	Q, SB
3	2	8	Ivory Coast	Murielle Ahouré-Demps, Marie-Josée Ta Lou, Jessika Gbai, Maboundou Koné	41.90	Q, AR
4	2	4	Italy	Dalia Kaddari, Anna Bongiorni, Alessia Pavese, Zaynab Dosso	42.14	Q, NR
5	1	5	Great Britain & N.I.	Asha Philip, Imani Lansiquot, Bianca Williams, Annie Tagoe	42.33	Q, SB
6	2	3	Netherlands	N'Ketia Seedo, Marije van Hunenstijn, Jamile Samuel, Tasa Jiya	42.53	q
7	1	4	Switzerland	Nathacha Kouni, Salomé Kora, Géraldine Frey, Melissa Gutschmidt	42.64	Q, SB
8	2	5	Poland	Pia Skrzyszowska, Krystsina Tsimanouskaya, Magdalena Stefanowicz, Ewa Swoboda	42.65	q, SB
9	1	7	Germany	Louise Wieland, Sina Mayer, Gina Lückenkemper, Rebekka Haase	42.78	qR, SB
10	1	8	Trinidad and Tobago	Akilah Lewis, Michelle-Lee Ahye, Reyare Thomas, Leah Bertrand	42.85	SB
11	1	9	Spain	Lucia Carrillo, Jaël Bestué, Paula Sevilla, Carmen Marco	42.96	SB
12	1	3	France	Carolle Zahi, Gémima Joseph, Helene Parisot, Mallory Leconte	43.12	SB
13	2	9	Cuba	Laura Moreira, Enis M. Pérez, Yarima García, Yunisleidy García	43.17	=SB
14	2	1	Hungary	Gréta Kerekes, Jusztina Csóti, Boglárka Takács, Anna Luca Kocsis	43.38	NR
15	2	2	Brazil	Garbriela Mourão, Vitoria Cristina Rosa, Ana Carolina Azevedo, Rosângela Santos	43.46	SB
	2	7	Nigeria	Justina Eyakpobeyan, Favour Ofili, Rosemary Chukwuma, Faith Okwose		DNF
	1	6	Australia	Ebony Lane, Bree Masters, Kristie Edwards, Torrie Lewis		DNF

=== Final ===
The final was started on 26 August at 21:53.

Rank	Lane	Nation	Athletes	Time	Notes
1st place, gold medalist(s)	6	United States	Tamari Davis, Twanisha Terry, Gabrielle Thomas, Sha'Carri Richardson	41.03	CR
2nd place, silver medalist(s)	7	Jamaica	Natasha Morrison, Shelly-Ann Fraser-Pryce, Shashalee Forbes, Shericka Jackson	41.21	SB
3rd place, bronze medalist(s)	8	Great Britain & N.I.	Asha Philip, Imani Lansiquot, Bianca Williams, Daryll Neita	41.97	SB
4	4	Italy	Zaynab Dosso, Dalia Kaddari, Anna Bongiorni, Alessia Pavese	42.49	
5	3	Poland	Pia Skrzyszowska, Krystsina Tsimanouskaya, Magdalena Stefanowicz, Ewa Swoboda	42.66	
6	1	Germany	Louise Wieland, Sina Mayer, Gina Lückenkemper, Rebekka Haase	42.98	
	5	Ivory Coast	Murielle Ahouré-Demps, Marie-Josée Ta Lou, Jessika Gbai, Maboundou Koné	DNF	
	2	Netherlands	N'Ketia Seedo, Lieke Klaver, Nadine Visser, Tasa Jiya	DNF	
	9	Switzerland	Nathacha Kouni, Salomé Kora, Géraldine Frey, Melissa Gutschmidt	DQ	TR24.7
