= 2021 European Athletics U23 Championships – Women's 100 metres =

Women's 100 metres at the 2021 European Athletics U23 Championships
- Venue: Kadriorg Stadium, Tallinn
- Dates: 8–9 July
- Competitors: 35 from 23 nations
- Winning time: 11.36

Medalists
gold medal	Lilly Kaden	Germany
silver medal	Rani Rosius	Belgium
bronze medal	Kristal Awuah	Great Britain

The women's 100 metres event at the 2021 European Athletics U23 Championships was held in Tallinn, Estonia, at Kadriorg Stadium on 8 and 9 July.

== Records ==
Prior to the competition, the records were as follows:

European U23 record	Marlies Göhr (GER)	10.88	Dresden, East Germany	1 July 1977
Championship U23 record	Maria Karastamati (GRE)	11.03	Erfurt, Germany	16 July 2005

== Results ==
=== Round 1 ===
Qualification rule: First 4 in each heat (Q) and the next 4 fastest (q) advance to the Semi-Finals.

Wind:
Heat 1: +1.0 m/s, Heat 2: +0.1 m/s, Heat 3: +0.4 m/s, Heat 4: +1.4 m/s, Heat 5: +0.6 m/s

Rank	Heat	Name	Nationality	Time	Notes
1	3	Klaudia Adamek	Poland	11.30	Q, PB
2	4	Kristal Awuah	Great Britain	11.36	Q
3	2	Rani Rosius	Belgium	11.41	Q
4	2	Lilly Kaden	Germany	11.41	Q
5	1	Vittoria Fontana	Italy	11.44	Q
6	4	Molly Scott	Ireland	11.49	Q, PB
7	4	Patrizia van der Weken	Luxembourg	11.50	Q, NR
8	4	Cynthia Reinle	Switzerland	11.52	Q
9	5	Zaynab Dosso	Italy	11.55	Q
10	1	Alisha Rees	Great Britain	11.55	Q
10	3	Keshia Beverly Kwadwo	Germany	11.55	Q
12	4	Mizgin Ay	Turkey	11.55	q, NU23R
13	1	Paulina Guzowska	Poland	11.57	Q
14	5	Magdalena Lindner	Austria	11.57	Q
15	2	Julia Henriksson	Sweden	11.63	Q, PB
16	1	Boglárka Takács	Hungary	11.64	Q, SB
17	2	Marina Andreea Baboi	Romania	11.66	Q
18	3	Viktoriya Ratnikova	Ukraine	11.68	Q
19	1	Aitana Rodrigo	Spain	11.68	q
20	5	Jaël Bestué	Spain	11.73	Q
21	3	Giorgia Bellinazzi	Italy	11.74	Q
22	3	Ingvild Meinseth	Norway	11.75	q, =SB
23	3	Nathacha Kouni	Switzerland	11.80	q
24	3	Karoli Käärt	Estonia	11.82	
25	1	Johana Kaiserová	Czech Republic	11.83	
26	5	Magdalena Stefanowicz	Poland	11.87	Q
27	2	Aoife Lynch	Ireland	11.88	
28	2	Katsiaryna Zhyvayeva	Belarus	11.89	
29	4	Marie-Ange Rimlinger	France	11.90	
30	5	Michelle Gloor	Switzerland	11.91	
31	4	Styliani-Alexandra Michailidou	Greece	11.97	
32	5	Gina Akpe-Moses	Ireland	12.01	
33	5	Yeva Podhorodetska	Ukraine	12.05	
34	1	Carla Scicluna	Malta	12.05	PB
35	2	Tiana Ósk Whitworth	Iceland	12.21	=SB

=== Semifinals ===
Qualification rule: First 2 in each heat (Q) and the next 2 fastest (q) advance to the Final.

Wind:
Heat 1: +3.0 m/s, Heat 2: +1.3 m/s, Heat 3: +0.3 m/s

Rank	Heat	Name	Nationality	Time	Notes
1	1	Rani Rosius	Belgium	11.16	Q
2	1	Vittoria Fontana	Italy	11.28	Q
3	3	Lilly Kaden	Germany	11.28	Q, PB
4	2	Kristal Awuah	Great Britain	11.33	Q
5	1	Cynthia Reinle	Switzerland	11.33	q
6	3	Klaudia Adamek	Poland	11.35	Q
7	1	Jaël Bestué	Spain	11.36	q
8	1	Magdalena Lindner	Austria	11.41	
9	1	Mizgin Ay	Turkey	11.44	
10	1	Keshia Beverly Kwadwo	Germany	11.45	
11	3	Molly Scott	Ireland	11.47	PB
12	2	Patrizia van der Weken	Luxembourg	11.52	Q
13	3	Marina Andreea Baboi	Romania	11.55	
14	3	Julia Henriksson	Sweden	11.56	PB
15	2	Zaynab Dosso	Italy	11.57	
16	2	Alisha Rees	Great Britain	11.57	
17	3	Paulina Guzowska	Poland	11.61	
18	2	Boglárka Takács	Hungary	11.65	
19	1	Aitana Rodrigo	Spain	11.66	
20	2	Magdalena Stefanowicz	Poland	11.70	
21	3	Giorgia Bellinazzi	Italy	11.73	
22	2	Viktoriya Ratnikova	Ukraine	11.80	
23	2	Ingvild Meinseth	Norway	11.87	
24	3	Nathacha Kouni	Switzerland	11.90	

=== Final ===
Wind: –1.3 m/s

Rank	Lane	Name	Nationality	Time	Notes
1st place, gold medalist(s)	3	Lilly Kaden	Germany	11.36	
2nd place, silver medalist(s)	4	Rani Rosius	Belgium	11.43	
3rd place, bronze medalist(s)	5	Kristal Awuah	Great Britain	11.44	
4	2	Jaël Bestué	Spain	11.52	
5	6	Vittoria Fontana	Italy	11.58	
6	1	Cynthia Reinle	Switzerland	11.65	
7	8	Klaudia Adamek	Poland	11.69	
8	7	Patrizia van der Weken	Luxembourg	11.73	
