= 2023 European Athletics U23 Championships – Women's 4 × 100 metres relay =

Women's 4 × 100 metres relay at the 2023 European Athletics U23 Championships
- Venue: Leppävaara Stadium
- Location: Espoo, Finland
- Dates: 15 July
- Competitors: 51 from 12 nations
- Winning time: 43.04 CR

Medalists
gold medal	Cassie-Ann Pemberton; Amy Hunt; Alyson Bell; Aleeya Sibbons	Great Britain
silver medal	Hillary Gode; Marie-Ange Rimlinger; Gémima Joseph; Paméra Losange	France
bronze medal	Nathacha Kouni; Iris Caligiuri; Léonie Pointet; Melissa Gutschmidt	Switzerland

The women's 4 × 100 metres relay event at the 2023 European Athletics U23 Championships was held in Espoo, Finland, at Leppävaara Stadium on 15 July.

== Records ==
Prior to the competition, the records were as follows:

European U23 record	East Germany (GDR)	42.09	Turin, Italy	4 August 1979
Championship U23 record	Germany (GER)	43.05	Tallinn, Estonia	11 July 2021

== Results ==
=== Round 1 ===
Qualification rule: First 3 in each heat (Q) and the next 2 fastest (q) advance to the Final.

Rank	Heat	Nation	Athletes	Time	Notes
1	2	Great Britain	Cassie-Ann Pemberton, Amy Hunt, Alyson Bell, Aleeya Sibbons	43.66	Q, EU23L
2	2	Germany	Antonia Dellert, Talea Prepens, Lilly Kaden, Tina Benzinger	43.74	Q, SB
3	1	Switzerland	Nathacha Kouni, Iris Caligiuri, Léonie Pointet, Melissa Gutschmidt	43.96	Q, SB
4	1	Belgium	Marine Jehaes, Janie de Naeyer, Miriam Oulare, Delphine Nkansa	44.27	Q, SB
5	1	France	Hillary Gode, Marie-Ange Rimlinger, Serena Koussi, Leelou Martial-Ehoulet	44.68	Q, SB
6	1	Finland	Vilma Itälinna, Anna Pursiainen, Julia Ihantola, Pirkitta Marjanen	45.18	q, SB
7	2	Poland	Dorota Puzio, Monika Romaszko, Zuzanna Borzewska, Aleksandra Krawczyk	45.20	Q, SB
8	2	Slovakia	Viktória Forster, Viktoria Stryckova, Lenka Kovačovicová, Agáta Cellerová	45.30	q, NU23R
9	2	Turkey	Yaren Yildirim, Simay Özçiftçi, Cansu Nimet Sayin, Gizem Akgöz	47.09	SB
10	1	Sweden	Wilma Svenson, Filippa Sivnert, Ida Staafgard, Famke Persson	59.73	SB
	2	Czech Republic	Pavla Kvasničková, Natálie Kožuškaničková, Barbora Šplechtnová, Eva Kubickova	DNF	
	1	Romania	Dana Maria Govoreanu, Maria Valeria Bisericescu, Emma Maria Matyus, Iulia-Dariana Grigoroiu	DNS	

=== Final ===
Rank	Nation	Athletes	Time	Notes
1st place, gold medalist(s)	Great Britain	Cassie-Ann Pemberton, Amy Hunt, Alyson Bell, Aleeya Sibbons	43.04	CR
2nd place, silver medalist(s)	France	Hillary Gode, Marie-Ange Rimlinger, Gémima Joseph, Paméra Losange	43.39	SB
3rd place, bronze medalist(s)	Switzerland	Nathacha Kouni, Iris Caligiuri, Léonie Pointet, Melissa Gutschmidt	43.59	NU23R
4	Germany	Antonia Dellert, Talea Prepens, Lilly Kaden, Tina Benzinger	43.61	SB
5	Belgium	Marine Jehaes, Janie de Naeyer, Miriam Oulare, Delphine Nkansa	43.66	NU23R
6	Poland	Dorota Puzio, Monika Romaszko, Aleksandra Krawczyk, Nikola Horowska	43.87	SB
7	Slovakia	Viktória Forster, Viktoria Stryckova, Lenka Kovačovicová, Agáta Cellerová	45.06	NU23R
	Finland	Vilma Itälinna, Anna Pursiainen, Julia Ihantola, Pirkitta Marjanen	DQ	
