= 2021 European Athletics U23 Championships – Women's 4 × 100 metres relay =

Women's 4 × 100 metres relay at the 2021 European Athletics U23 Championships
- Venue: Kadriorg Stadium, Tallinn
- Dates: 11 July
- Competitors: 64 from 16 nations
- Winning time: 43.05

Medalists
gold medal	Lilly Kaden; Keshia Beverly Kwadwo; Sophia Junk; Talea Prepens	Germany
silver medal	Aitana Rodrigo; Jaël Bestué; Eva Santidrián; Carmen Marco	Spain
bronze medal	Marie-Ange Rimlinger; Sacha Alessandrini; Wided Atatou; Mallory Leconte	France

The women's 4 × 100 metres relay event at the 2021 European Athletics U23 Championships was held on Day 4 on July 11 at Kadriorg Stadium in Tallinn, Estonia.

== Records ==
Prior to the competition, the records were as follows:

European U23 record	East Germany (GDR)	42.09	Turin, Italy	4 August 1979
Championship U23 record	Germany (GER)	43.29	Tampere, Finland	14 July 2013

== Results ==
=== Round 1 ===
Qualification rule: First 3 in each heat (Q) and the next 2 fastest (q) advance to the Final.

Rank	Heat	Nation	Athletes	Time	Notes
1	2	Germany	Lilly Kaden, Keshia Beverly Kwadwo, Sophia Junk, Talea Prepens	43.24	Q, CR
2	2	Spain	Aitana Rodrigo, Jaël Bestué, Eva Santidrián, Carmen Marco	43.50	Q, NU23R
3	1	Great Britain	Ellie Booker, Alisha Rees, Georgina Adam, Kristal Awuah	43.62	Q
4	1	Italy	Aurora Berton, Giorgia Bellinazzi, Chiara Melon, Zaynab Dosso	43.65	Q, NU23R
5	1	France	Marie-Ange Rimlinger, Sacha Alessandrini, Wided Atatou, Mallory Leconte	43.74	Q
6	2	Poland	Adriana Gąsior, Paulina Guzowska, Alicja Struzik, Magdalena Stefanowicz	44.29	Q
7	2	Sweden	Julia Wennersten, Wilma Rosenquist, Filippa Sivnert, Julia Henriksson	44.51	q
8	1	Ireland	Molly Scott, Aoife Lynch, Lauren Roy, Gina Akpe-Moses	44.64	q, NU23R
9	2	Switzerland	Judith Goll, Cynthia Reinle, Michelle Gloor, Nathacha Kouni	44.77	
10	2	Greece	Styliani-Alexandra Michailidou, Paraskevi-Eleni Anthi, Dimitra Tsoukala, Artemis Melina Anastasiou	45.14	
11	1	Czech Republic	Natálie Kožuškaničová, Štepánka Kolářová, Agáta Kolingerová, Johana Kaiserová	45.14	
12	1	Norway	Thale Leirfall, Kaitesi Ertzgaard, Ingvild Meinseth, Ida Eikeng	45.24	
13	1	Ukraine	Iryna Panarina, Yeva Podhorodetska, Viktoriya Ratnikova, Anastasiya Osokina	45.33	
14	2	Austria	Antonia Kaiser, Magdalena Lindner, Leonie Springer, Laura Zechner	45.48	
	2	Israel	Alina Drutman, Eden Finkelstein, Nitzan Levy, Ilana Dorfman	DNF	
	1	Belgium	Lucie Ferauge, Justine Goossens, Rani Vincke, Rani Rosius	DQ	TR17.3.1

=== Final ===
Rank	Nation	Athletes	Time	Notes
1st place, gold medalist(s)	Germany	Lilly Kaden, Keshia Beverly Kwadwo, Sophia Junk, Talea Prepens	43.05	CR
2nd place, silver medalist(s)	Spain	Aitana Rodrigo, Jaël Bestué, Eva Santidrián, Carmen Marco	43.74	
3rd place, bronze medalist(s)	France	Marie-Ange Rimlinger, Sacha Alessandrini, Wided Atatou, Mallory Leconte	44.15	
4	Poland	Adriana Gąsior, Paulina Guzowska, Alicja Struzik, Magdalena Stefanowicz	44.22	
	Ireland	Molly Scott, Aoife Lynch, Lauren Roy, Gina Akpe-Moses	DNF	
	Sweden	Julia Wennersten, Wilma Rosenquist, Filippa Sivnert, Julia Henriksson	DNF	
	Great Britain	Ellie Booker, Alisha Rees, Georgina Adam, Kristal Awuah	DNF	
	Italy	Aurora Berton, Giorgia Bellinazzi, Chiara Melon, Zaynab Dosso	DQ	TR17.3.1
