= 2022 European Athletics Championships – Women's 100 metres =

Women's 100 metres at the 2022 European Athletics Championships
- Venue: Olympiastadion
- Location: Munich
- Dates: 15 August (round 1); 16 August (semifinals & final)
- Winning time: 10.99

Medalists
gold medal	Gina Lückenkemper	Germany
silver medal	Mujinga Kambundji	Switzerland
bronze medal	Daryll Neita	Great Britain

The women's 100 metres at the 2022 European Athletics Championships took place at the Olympiastadion on 15 and 16 August.

The gold and silver medallists were given the same time of 10.99 seconds, the first time this has happened in the women's 100 metres at these championships since the introduction of fully automatic timing.

== Records ==
Standing records prior to the 2022 European Athletics Championships
World record	Florence Griffith-Joyner (USA)	10.49	Indianapolis, United States	16 July 1988
European record	Christine Arron (FRA)	10.73	Budapest, Hungary	19 August 1998
Championship record	Christine Arron (FRA)	10.73	Budapest, Hungary	19 August 1998
World Leading	Shelly-Ann Fraser-Pryce (JAM)	10.62	Monaco	10 August 2022
Europe Leading	Dina Asher-Smith (GBR)	10.83	Eugene, United States	17 July 2022

== Schedule ==
Date	Time	Round
15 August 2022	11:05	Round 1
16 August 2022	20:35	Semifinals
16 August 2022	22:25	Final

All times are local times (UTC+2)

== Results ==
=== Round 1 ===
First 4 in each heat (Q) and the next 3 fastest (q) advance to the Semifinals. The nine highest ranked entrants received a bye to the Semifinals

Rank	Heat	Lane	Name	Nationality	Time	Note
1	2	2	Delphine Nkansa	Belgium	11.33	Q
2	1	8	Zaynab Dosso	Italy	11.38	Q
3	2	4	Jaël Bestué	Spain	11.39	Q
4	2	8	Ashleigh Nelson	Great Britain	11.41	Q
5	2	3	Tatjana Pinto	Germany	11.43	Q
6	3	3	Boglárka Takács	Hungary	11.44	Q
6	1	4	Magdalena Stefanowicz	Poland	11.44	Q
8	1	2	Géraldine Frey	Switzerland	11.45	Q
9	1	5	Patrizia van der Weken	Luxembourg	11.46	Q
10	1	6	Rani Rosius	Belgium	11.47	q
11	3	2	Lorène Bazolo	Portugal	11.48	Q
12	3	3	Mallory Leconte	France	11.49	Q
13	3	3	Rebekka Haase	Germany	11.50	Q
14	1	3	Milana Tirnanić	Serbia	11.57	q
15	2	1	Irene Siragusa	Italy	11.57	q
16	1	1	Magdalena Lindner	Austria	11.58	
17	2	7	Mathilde Kramer	Denmark	11.58	
18	2	5	Eva Kubíčková	Czech Republic	11.61	
19	3	3	Rafaéla Spanoudaki-Hatziriga	Greece	11.62	
20	2	6	Olivia Fotopoulou	Cyprus	11.62	
21	3	3	Sonia Molina-Prados	Spain	11.64	
22	3	3	Gloria Hooper	Italy	11.64	
23	1	7	Viktória Forster	Slovakia	11.72	

=== Semifinals ===
First 2 in each Semifinal (Q) and the next 2 fastest (q) advance to the final.

Rank	Heat	Lane	Name	Nationality	Time	Note
1	1	6	Daryll Neita	Great Britain	10.95	Q
2	3	6	Mujinga Kambundji	Switzerland	11.05	Q
3	1	5	Gina Lückenkemper	Germany	11.11	Q
4	2	6	Dina Asher-Smith	Great Britain	11.15	Q
5	3	4	Ewa Swoboda	Poland	11.22	Q
6	1	4	Imani-Lara Lansiquot	Great Britain	11.23	q
7	1	3	Zaynab Dosso	Italy	11.28	q
8	2	3	María Isabel Pérez	Spain	11.35	Q
9	3	5	Diana Vaisman	Israel	11.36	
10	1	7	Géraldine Frey	Switzerland	11.38	
11	3	7	Delphine Nkansa	Belgium	11.39	
12	3	3	Jaël Bestué	Spain	11.40	
13	1	8	Lorène Bazolo	Portugal	11.42	
14	1	2	Magdalena Stefanowicz	Poland	11.43	
15	3	2	Ashleigh Nelson	Great Britain	11.47	
16	2	1	Boglárka Takács	Hungary	11.49	
17	2	2	Patrizia van der Weken	Luxembourg	11.51	
18	2	4	Rebekka Haase	Germany	11.52	
19	2	8	Rani Rosius	Belgium	11.53	
20	2	5	Nathacha Kouni	Switzerland	11.54	
21	3	8	Tatjana Pinto	Germany	11.55	
22	3	1	Irene Siragusa	Italy	11.56	
	2	7	Mallory Leconte	France	DQ	TR16.8
	1	1	Milana Tirnanić	Serbia	DQ	TR16.8

=== Final ===
Wind: +0.1 m/s

Rank	Lane	Name	Nationality	Time	Note
1st place, gold medalist(s)	6	Gina Lückenkemper	Germany	10.99	=SB
2nd place, silver medalist(s)	4	Mujinga Kambundji	Switzerland	10.99	
3rd place, bronze medalist(s)	5	Daryll Neita	Great Britain	11.00	
4	7	Ewa Swoboda	Poland	11.18	
5	1	Imani-Lara Lansiquot	Great Britain	11.21	
6	8	María Isabel Pérez	Spain	11.28	
7	2	Zaynab Dosso	Italy	11.37	
8	3	Dina Asher-Smith	Great Britain	16.03	
