= 2023 European Athletics U23 Championships – Women's 100 metres =

Women's 100 metres at the 2023 European Athletics U23 Championships
- Venue: Leppävaara Stadium
- Location: Espoo, Finland
- Dates: 13 July (heats & semi-finals); 14 July (final)
- Competitors: 30 from 24 nations
- Winning time: 11.22

Medalists
gold medal	N'Ketia Seedo	Netherlands
silver medal	Boglárka Takács	Hungary
bronze medal	Mélissa Gutschmidt	Switzerland

The women's 100 metres event at the 2023 European Athletics U23 Championships was held in Espoo, Finland, at Leppävaara Stadium on 13 and 14 July.

== Records ==
Prior to the competition, the records were as follows:

European U23 record	Marlies Oelsner (GDR)	10.88	Dresden, East Germany	1 July 1977
Championship U23 record	Maria Karastamati (GRE)	11.03	Erfurt, Germany	16 July 2005

== Results ==
=== Heats ===
First 3 in each heat (Q) and the next 4 fastest (q) will qualify for the semi-finals.

==== Heat 1 ====
Place	Athlete	Nation	Time	Notes
1	Mélissa Gutschmidt	Switzerland	11.47	Q
2	Aleeya Sibbons	Great Britain	11.52	Q
3	Antonia Dellert	Germany	11.62	Q
4	Karolína Maňasová	Czech Republic	11.63	q
5	Katarina Vreta	Serbia	11.81	
6	Dorota Puzio	Poland	11.82	
7	Maren Bakke Amundsen	Norway	12.06	
			Wind: (−0.9 m/s)	

==== Heat 2 ====
Place	Athlete	Nation	Time	Notes
1	Boglárka Takács	Hungary	10.26	Q
2	Elena Daniel	Spain	10.42	Q
3	Nathacha Kouni	Switzerland	10.48	Q
4	Guðbjörg Jóna Bjarnadóttir	Iceland	10.52	
5	Adeyemi Talabi	Ireland	10.53	
6	Carla Scicluna	Malta	10.66	
7	Maria Bisericescu	Romania	10.66	
8	Chloé Galet	France	10.66	
			Wind: (−1.3 m/s)	

==== Heat 3 ====
Place	Athlete	Nation	Time	Notes
1	Polyniki Emmanouilidou	Greece	10.26	Q
2	Alyson Bell	Great Britain	10.42	Q
3	Ivana Ilic	Serbia	10.48	Q, NU23R
4	Monika Romaszko	Poland	10.52	q
5	Ann Marii Kivikas	Estonia	10.53	q
6	Íris Silva	Portugal	10.66	
7	Agáta Cellerová	Slovakia	10.66	
			Wind: (+0.6 m/s)	

==== Heat 4 ====
Place	Athlete	Nation	Time	Notes
1	N'Ketia Seedo	Netherlands	10.26	Q
2	Delphine Nkansa	Belgium	10.42	Q
3	Lilly Kaden	Germany	10.48	Q
4	Marie-Ange Rimlinger	France	10.52	q
5	Filippa Sivnert	Sweden	10.53	
6	Simay Özçiftçi	Turkey	10.66	
7	Anna Pursiainen	Finland	10.66	
8	Sona Adamyan	Armenia	10.66	SB
			Wind: (−1.1 m/s)	

=== Semi-finals ===
First 3 in each heat (Q) and the next 2 fastest (q) will qualify for the final.

==== Heat 1 ====
Place	Athlete	Nation	Time	Notes
1	Boglárka Takács	Hungary	11.14	Q, NR, EU23L
2	Nathacha Kouni	Switzerland	11.29	Q
3	Alyson Bell	Great Britain	11.31	Q, =PB
4	Polyniki Emmanouilidou	Greece	11.32	q
5	Marie-Ange Rimlinger	France	11.36	q, PB
6	Monika Romaszko	Poland	11.38	
7	Antonia Dellert	Germany	11.48	
8	Elena Daniel	Spain	11.63	
			Wind: (+1.7 m/s)	

==== Heat 2 ====
Place	Athlete	Nation	Time	Notes
1	N'Ketia Seedo	Netherlands	11.20	Q
2	Delphine Nkansa	Belgium	11.22	Q
3	Mélissa Gutschmidt	Switzerland	11.33	Q
4	Lilly Kaden	Germany	11.42	
5	Aleeya Sibbons	Great Britain	11.42	
6	Ivana Ilic	Serbia	11.45	
7	Karolína Maňasová	Czech Republic	11.53	
8	Ann Marii Kivikas	Estonia	11.54	
			Wind: (+1.1 m/s)	

=== Final ===
Place	Lane	Athlete	Nation	Time	Notes
1st place, gold medalist(s)	5	N'Ketia Seedo	Netherlands	11.22	
2nd place, silver medalist(s)	6	Boglárka Takács	Hungary	11.30	
3rd place, bronze medalist(s)	2	Mélissa Gutschmidt	Switzerland	11.33	
4	3	Delphine Nkansa	Belgium	11.36	
5	8	Polyniki Emmanouilidou	Greece	11.40	
6	7	Alyson Bell	Great Britain	11.46	
7	4	Nathacha Kouni	Switzerland	11.55	
8	1	Marie-Ange Rimlinger	France	11.62	
				Wind: (+0.6 m/s)	
