= Zaynab Dosso =

Italian sprinter (born 1999)

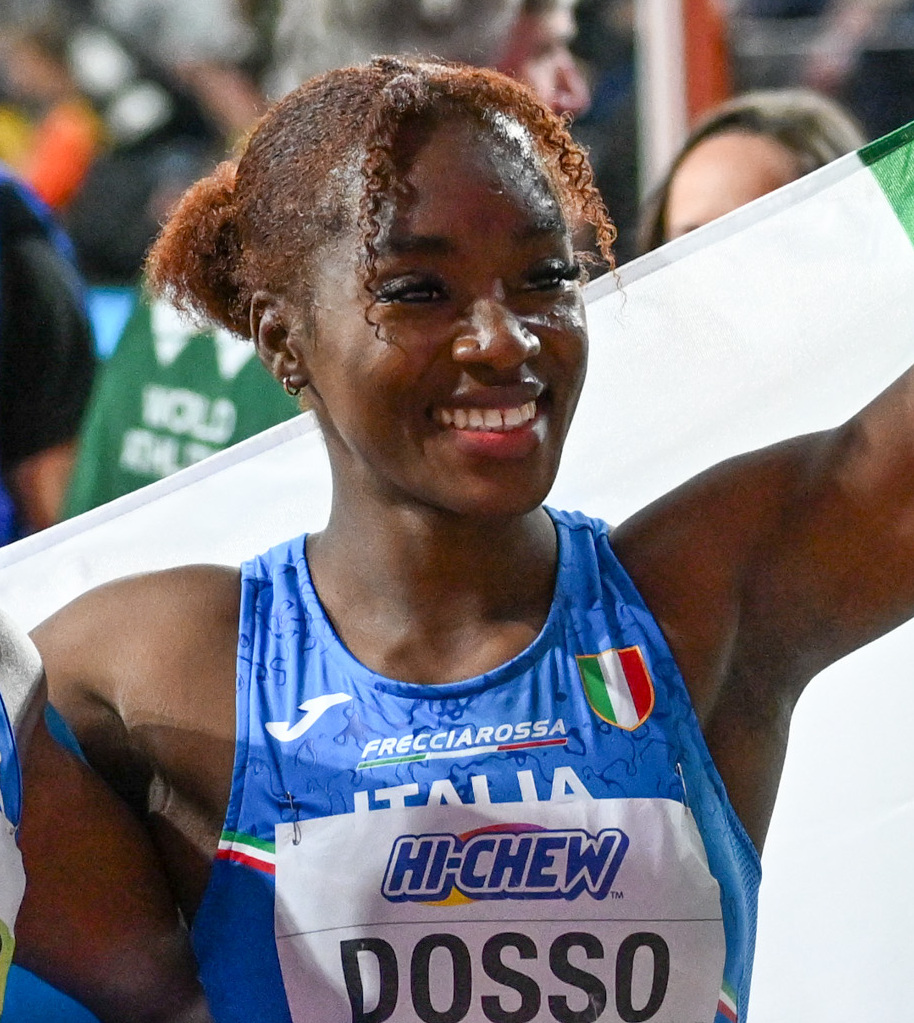

Personal information
- National team: Italy (13 caps)
- Born: 12 September 1999 (age 27) Man, Ivory Coast
- Height: 1.70 m (5 ft 7 in)
- Weight: 62 kg (137 lb)

Sport
- Sport: Athletics
- Event: Sprinting
- Club: Fiamme Azzurre
- Coached by: Loredana Riccardi

Achievements and titles
- Personal bests: 60 m indoor: 6.99 (2026) NR; 100 m: 11.02 (2024) NR; 200 m: 24.01 (2017)
Medal record
Representing Italy
World Indoor Championships
Gold medal – first place	2026 Toruń	60 m
Silver medal – second place	2025 Nanjing	60 m
Bronze medal – third place	2024 Glasgow	60 m
European Championships
Bronze medal – third place	2022 Munich	4 × 100 m relay
Bronze medal – third place	2024 Rome	100 m
European Indoor Championships
Gold medal – first place	2025 Apeldoorn	60 m

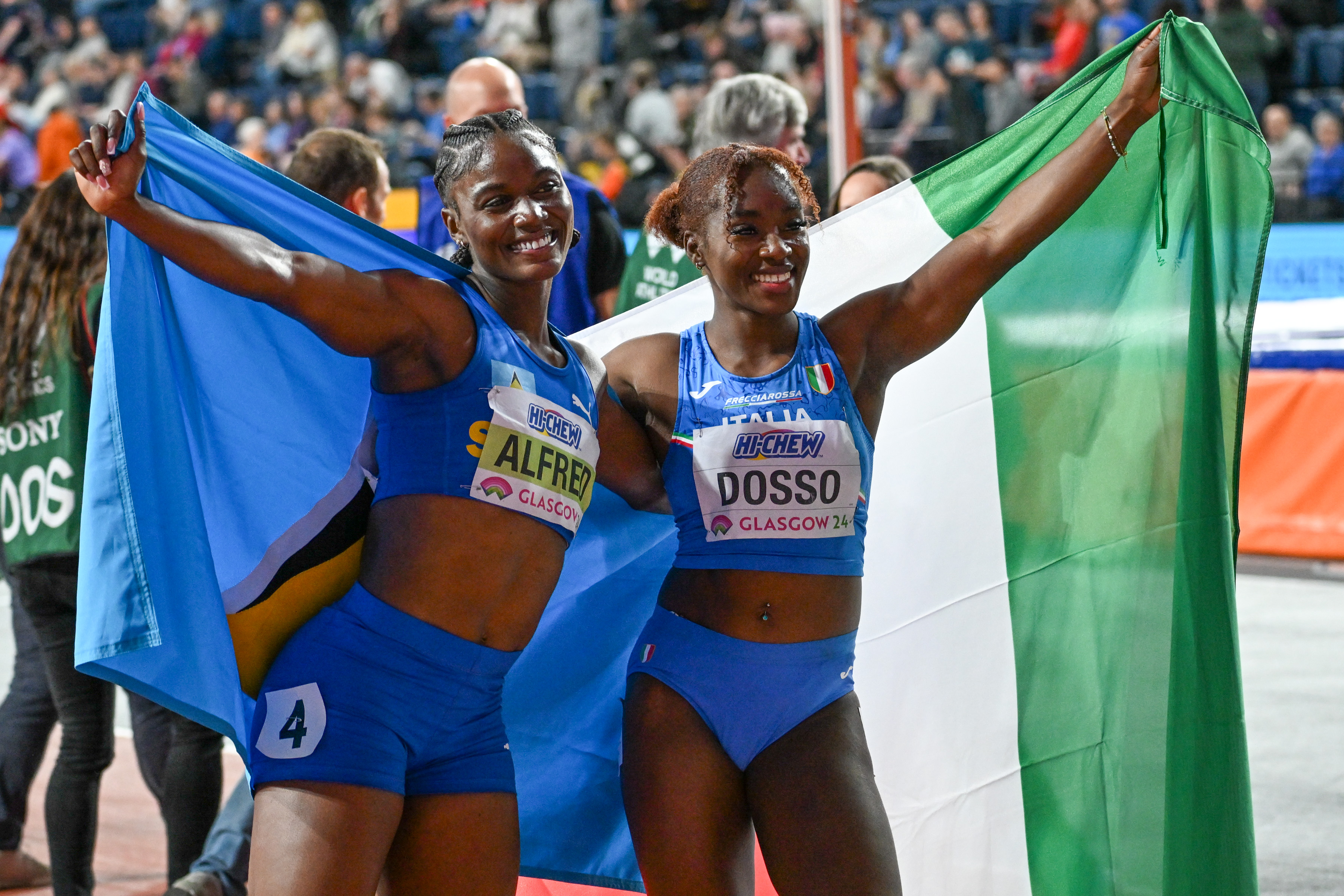
Julien Alfred and Zaynab Dosso at Glasgow 2024.

Zaynab Dosso (born 12 September 1999) is an Italian sprinter. She is the reigning World Indoor Championships over 60 metres, having won the gold medal at the 2026 World Athletics Indoor Championships. She previously won the silver medal at the championships in 2025 and the bronze medal in 2024, as well as the gold medal at the 2025 European Athletics Indoor Championships. She competed at the 2020 Summer Olympics, in 4 × 100 m relay.

== Biography ==
Zaynab is the daughter of Ivorian parents who moved to Italy in 2002; she came to Italy herself in 2009 when she was ten years old. Dosso acquired Italian citizenship in 2016.

A specialist over 60 metres, Dosso won the bronze medal in Glasgow at the 2024 World Athletics Indoor Championships, and the silver medal at the 2025 World Athletics Championships in Nanjing. In 2026, she ran 7.00 seconds in both the semi-final and final to win the gold medal over 60 metres at the 2026 World Athletics Indoor Championships ahead of American Jacious Sears and 2024 Olympic gold medalist Julien Alfred. The win came on the same evening as Nadia Battocletti won the 3000 metres, with the gold medals marking Italy's first at the Championships since Fiona May claimed the long jump victory in 1997. The 2026 Championships took place in Toruń, Poland, in March 2026. In the previous month, Dosso became only the fifth European woman to run below seven seconds, setting a 6.99 seconds personal best and national record at the Copernicus Cup in Toruń. Her previous personal best was 7.01 seconds which she had run to win the gold medal at the 2025 European Athletics Indoor Championships in Apeldoorn, Netherlands.

Over 100 metres, Dosso is a multiple-time Italian national champion and won the bronze medal at the 2024 European Athletics Championships in Rome, setting the Italian national record of 11.01 seconds that year.

== Athletics achievements ==
Information from her World Athletics profile unless otherwise noted.

=== Personal bests ===
Type	Distance	Time (s)	Wind (m/s)	Venue	Date	Notes
Individual events
Indoor	50 metres	6.09	—N/a	Ostrava, Czech Republic	3 February 2026	NR
Indoor	60 metres	6.99	—N/a	Toruń, Poland	22 February 2026	NR
Indoor	200 metres sh	24.01	—N/a	Ancona, Italy	5 February 2017	
Outdoor	100 metres	11.01	+2.0	Rome, Italy	9 June 2024	NR
Outdoor	150 metres	17.21	-1.1	Rome, Italy	12 May 2022	
Outdoor	200 metres	23.10	-0.4	Rome, Italy	18 May 2024	
Team events
Indoor	4 × 200 metres relay sh	1:37.85	—N/a	Halle, Germany	4 March 2017	
Outdoor	4 × 100 metres relay	42.14	—N/a	Budapest, Hungary	25 August 2023	NR

=== International competitions ===
Representing Italy
Year	Competition	Venue	Position	Event	Time	Notes
2016	European Youth Championships	Tbilisi, Georgia	4th	100 m	11.83	
2016	European Youth Championships	Tbilisi, Georgia	3rd	Medley relay	2:08.99	PB
2016	World U20 Championships	Bydgoszcz, Poland	8th (h)	4 × 100 m relay	45.50	
2017	European U20 Championships	Grosseto, Italy	17th (sf)	100 m	11.99	
2017	European U20 Championships	Grosseto, Italy	9th (sf)	4 × 100 m relay	45.11	
2019	European U23 Championships	Gävle, Sweden	21st (h)	100 m	12.12	
2019	European U23 Championships	Gävle, Sweden	7th	4 × 100 m relay	45.29	
2019	European Team Championships Super League	Bydgoszcz, Poland	5th	100 m	11.70	
2019	European Team Championships Super League	Bydgoszcz, Poland	6th	4 × 100 m relay	44.20	
2021	European U23 Championships	Tallinn, Estonia	15th (sf)	100 m	11.57	
2021	European U23 Championships	Tallinn, Estonia	DQ	4 × 100 m relay	43.65 (Note: Time from the heats; disqualified in semi-finals)	TR17.2.3
2022	World Indoor Championships	Belgrade, Serbia	12th (sf)	60 m	7.16	
2022	World Championships	Eugene, United States	21st (sf)	100 m	11.28	
2022	World Championships	Eugene, United States	8th	4 × 100 m relay	42.92	
2022	European Championships	Munich, Germany	7th	100 m	11.37	
2022	European Championships	Munich, Germany	3rd	4 × 100 m relay	42.84	
2023	European Team Championships First Division	Chorzów, Poland	12th	100 m	11.45	SB
2023	World Championships	Budapest, Hungary	19th (sf)	100 m	11.19	
2023	World Championships	Budapest, Hungary	4th	4 × 100 m relay	42.49	
2024	World Indoor Championships	Glasgow, United Kingdom	3rd	60 m	7.05	
2024	World Relays	Nassau, Bahamas	11th	4 × 100 m relay	43.08	Re
2024	World Relays	Nassau, Bahamas	1st	4 × 100 m relay	42.60	WQ
2024	European Championships	Rome, Italy	3rd	100 m	11.03	
2024	Olympic Games	Paris, France	22nd (sf)	100 m	11.34	
2024	Olympic Games	Paris, France	20th (h)	4 × 100 m relay	43.03	
2025	European Indoor Championships	Apeldoorn, Netherlands	1st	60 m	7.01	WL NR
2025	World Indoor Championships	Nanjing, China	2nd	60 m	7.06	
2025	European Team Championships First Division	Madrid, Spain	5th	100 m	11.22	SB
2025	European Team Championships First Division	Madrid, Spain	4th	4 × 100 m relay	42.58	SB
2025	World Championships	Tokyo, Japan	18th (sf)	100 m	11.22	
2026	World Indoor Championships	Toruń, Poland	1st	60 m	7.00	
2026	World Relays	Gaborone, Botswana	4th	4 × 100 m relay	42.94 (Note: Time from the heats; she did not run in the final.)	
2026	World Relays	Gaborone, Botswana	11th	4 × 100 m relay Mx	40.69	WQ
2026	European Championships	Birmingham, United Kingdom	7th	100 m	11.12	
2026	European Championships	Birmingham, United Kingdom	4th	4 × 100 m relay	43.21	
2026	World Ultimate Championship	Budapest, Hungary	13th (h)	100 m	11.26	

=== National titles ===
She has won ten national titles at individual senior level.

- Italian Athletics Championships
  - 100 metres: 2019, 2020, 2022, 2023, 2024, 2025 (6)
- Italian Athletics Indoor Championships
  - 60 metres: 2022, 2024, 2025, 2026 (4)

== See also ==
- Italian records in athletics
- Italian all-time lists – 100 metres
- Naturalized athletes of Italy
