= Nathacha Kouni =

Swiss athlete (born 2001)

Personal information
- Nationality: Swiss
- Born: 18 February 2001 (age 25)

Sport
- Sport: Athletics
- Event: Sprint

Achievements and titles
- Personal bests: 60m: 7.19 (2026); 100m: 11.12 (2026); 200m: 24.09 (2021)
Medal record
Women's athletics
Representing Switzerland
European U23 Championships
Bronze medal – third place	2023 Espoo	4 × 100 m relay

Nathacha Kouni (born 18 February 2001) is a Swiss sprinter. She represented Switzerland at the 2023 World Athletics Championships.

== Biography ==
In June 2022, Kouni set a new Swiss U23 record for 100 metres at the Leichtathletik-Meeting de la Gruyère in Bulle, her time of 11.12 seconds surpassing the previous best set by Mujinga Kambundji. The time also moved her to third on the Swiss senior all-time list behind Kambundji and Ajla Del Ponte. She made her senior international debut at the 2022 European Athletics Championships in Munich, Germany, reaching the semi-finals of the 100 metres.

She won a bronze medal representing Switzerland at the 2023 European Athletics U23 Championships in Espoo, Finland, in the women's 4 x 100 metres relay. She represented Switzerland as part of the sprint relay team at the 2023 World Athletics Championships in Budapest.

In July 2026, she placed third behind new Swiss-record setter Géraldine Di Tizio-Frey over 100 metres at the Swiss Athletics Championships in Zurich, having equalled her personal best with a time of 11.12 seconds in the heats. She subsequently represented Switzerland at the 2026 European Athletics Championships in Birmingham in the 100 metres, reaching the semi-finals.

== Athletic Achievements ==
=== Personal bests ===
Type	Distance	Time (s)	Wind (m/s)	Venue	Date	Notes
Individual events
Indoor	60 metres	7.19	—N/a	St. Gallen, Switzerland	28 February 2026	
Indoor	200 metres sh	25.30	—N/a	Magglingen, Switzerland	1 February 2020	
Outdoor	100 metres	11.12	+1.9	Bulle, Switzerland	9 July 2022	
Outdoor	200 metres	24.09	+0.2	Nottwil, Switzerland	5 September 2021	
Team events
Outdoor	4 × 100 metres relay	42.64	—N/a	Budapest, Hungary	25 August 2023	

=== International competitions ===
Representing Switzerland
Year	Competition	Venue	Position	Event	Time	Notes
2019	European U20 Championships	Borås, Sweden	29th (h)	100 m	12.44	
2019	European U20 Championships	Borås, Sweden	7th	4 × 100 m relay	45.47	
2021	European U23 Championships	Tallinn, Estonia	24th (sf)	100 m	11.90	
2021	European U23 Championships	Tallinn, Estonia	9th (h)	4 × 100 m relay	44.77	
2022	European Championships	Munich, Germany	20th (sf)	100 m	11.54	
2023	European U23 Championships	Espoo, Finland	7th	100 m	11.55	
2023	European U23 Championships	Espoo, Finland	3rd	4 × 100 m relay	43.59	NU23R
2023	World Championships	Budapest, Hungary	—	4 × 100 m relay	DQ	TR24.7
2026	European Championships	Birmingham, United Kingdom	14th (sf)	100 m	11.26	

== Personal life ==
Kouni was born in Cameroon and raised in Dietikon, She is German-speaking.
