= Talea Prepens =

German sprinter & bobsledder (born 2001)

Personal information
- Born: 28 December 2001 (age 24) Cloppenburg, Germany

Sport
- Country: Germany
- Sport: Athletics
- Event: Sprint

Achievements and titles
- Personal bests: 100 m: 11.38 (Wetzlar, 2024); 200 m: 22.83 (Rome, 2024)
Medal record
Representing Germany
Women's athletics
World University Games
Bronze medal – third place	2025 Bochum	4 × 100 m relay
World Youth Championships
Gold medal – first place	2017 Nairobi	200 m
European U23 Championships
Gold medal – first place	2021 Tallinn	4 × 100 m relay
European U20 Championships
Bronze medal – third place	2019 Borås	4 × 100 m relay
Women's bobsleigh
European Championships
Bronze medal – third place	2026 St. Moritz	Two-woman

Talea Prepens (born 28 December 2001) is a German sprinter and bobsledder. She won the 2017 IAAF World U18 Championships title over 200 metres. She won a bronze medal in the two-woman bobsleigh at the 2026 European Championships.

== Biography ==
She is from Cloppenburg and is a member of TV Cloppenburg as well as being trained by her father Harald Prepens.

She won the 2017 IAAF World U18 Championships title over 200 metres in Nairobi, Kenya, at the age of 15 years old. She won this title despite being the youngest athlete in the field. She won the title with her second personal best at the championships, running 23.51 seconds in the final, after running 23.64 in the semi-finals.

At the 2019 European Athletics U20 Championships in Borås, she won bronze with the German relay team in the 4 × 100 m relay alongside compatriots Kathleen Reinhardt, Denise Uphoff, and Chiara Schimpf.

In 2021, she won gold in the 2021 European Athletics U23 Championships in Tallinn in the 4 × 100 m relay, alongside Lilly Kaden, Keshia Beverly Kwadwo, and Sophia Junk. She also finished in fourth place in the individual 200 metres at the Championships.

She won back-to-back sprint doubles over 100 metres and 200 metres at the German Athletics U23 Championships in 2022 and 2023. She finished fourth in the 200 m at the 2023 European Athletics U23 Championships in Espoo, Finland. She competed at the delayed 2021 University Games in Chengdu, China in 2023 finishing sixth in the 100 metres.

She ran a personal best of 22.83 over 200 metres at the 2024 European Athletics Championships in Rome to qualify for the semi-finals. In the semi-final, she ran 22.99 seconds to place fourth in her heat but did not proceed to the final.

Prepens won a bronze medal in the 4 × 100 metres at the 2025 Summer World University Games. In January 2026, she won a bronze medal competing in Bobsleigh at the 2026 IBSF European Championships. She was selected for the Germany team for the 2026 Winter Olympics. August 2026, she competed at the 2026 European Athletics Championships in Birmingham, England, in the women's 200 metres, reaching the semi-finals.

== Personal life ==
She plays double bass and played in a youth symphony orchestra. Her brother Torben Prepens competes in the decathlon.
