= Kristal Awuah =

British sprinter

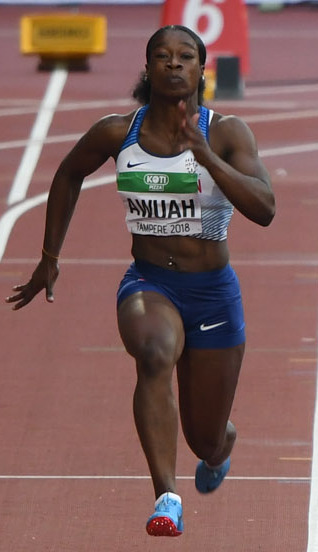
- Awuah at 2018 IAAF World U20 Championships Tampere.

Personal information
- Nationality: Great Britain
- Born: Kristal Ama-Awuah; 7 August 1999 (age 27)

Sport
- Sport: Athletics
- Event: Sprint

Achievements and titles
- Personal bests: 60 m: 7.15 (2019); 100 m: 11.16 (2018); 200 m: 22.99 (2026)
Medal record
Women's athletics
Representing Great Britain
European Championships
Gold medal – first place	2026 Birmingham	4 × 100 m relay
World U20 Championships
Bronze medal – third place	2018 Tampere	100 m
Bronze medal – third place	2018 Tampere	4 × 100 m relay

Kristal Ama-Awuah (born 7 August 1999) is a British track and field athlete who competes as a sprinter. She won a gold medal with the Great Britain women's 4 × 100 metres team at the 2026 European Championships. She was a bronze medalist over 100 metres at the 2018 World U20 Championships.

== Early life ==
From Tooting Bec, London, she trained as a member of the Herne Hill Harriers. Awuah attended St Martin-in-the-Fields High School for Girls in Lambeth.

== Career ==
Awuah gained her first international experience at the 2018 IAAF World U20 Championships in Tampere, where she won the bronze medal in 11.37 seconds for the 100 metres, as well as gaining a medal with the British 4 × 100 metres relay team. She finished fourth in the 60 metres at the 2019 European Athletics Indoor Championships in Glasgow with a personal best time of 7.15 seconds. In July 2019 she finished sixth in the 200 metres at the 2019 European Athletics U23 Championships in Gävle in 23.66 seconds and was part of the British relay pool at the 2019 World Athletics Championships in Doha. In September 2020, she was runner-up over 100 metres at the 2020 British Athletics Championships.

Awuah claimed two national age group gold medals at the England Athletics U20 and U23 championships in Bedford in June 2021. On 26 June 2021 at the British Championship she finished fourth in the 100 m in a seasons best time of 11.23 seconds. The next day she also reached the final of the women's 200 m, finishing 8th.

In July 2023, competing at the British National Championship in Manchester, she reached the final in the 100 m and finished fourth overall. The following day she is also reached the final of the 200m, and finished seventh.

In April 2024, she was selected as part of the British team for the 2024 World Athletics Relays in Nassau, Bahamas. In July 2024 she finished second in the 200 metres at the English Championships in Birmingham.

On 20 June 2026, she was a finalist in the 100 metres at the 2026 UK Championships in Birmingham. The following day, she returned to the track and ran a personal best 22.99 seconds in the 200 metres to place third in the final. In August, she ran in the preliminary round of the women's 4 × 100 metres relay at the 2026 European Athletics Championships in Birmingham, with the team winning the gold medal in the final.

== Personal life ==
She is of Ghanaian descent.

== Athletic Achievements ==
=== Personal bests ===
Type	Distance	Time (s)	Wind (m/s)	Venue	Date	Notes
Individual events
Indoor	60 metres	7.15	—N/a	Glasgow, United Kingdom	2 March 2019	
Outdoor	100 metres	11.16	-0.1	Berlin, Germany	2 September 2018	
Outdoor	200 metres	22.57	+1.9	London, United Kingdom	12 July 2026	
Team events
Outdoor	4 × 100 metres relay	42.37	—N/a	Birmingham, United Kingdom	15 August 2026	

=== International competitions ===
Representing Great Britain
Year	Competition	Venue	Position	Event	Time
2018	World U20 Championships	Tampere, Finland	3rd	100 m	11.37
2018	World U20 Championships	Tampere, Finland	3rd	4 × 100 m relay	44.05
2019	European Indoor Championships	Glasgow, United Kingdom	4th	60 m	7.15
2019	World Relays	Yokohama, Japan	—	4 × 100 m relay	DNF
2019	European U23 Championships	Gävle, Sweden	6th	200 m	23.66
2019	European Team Championships Super League	Bydgoszcz, Poland	3rd	4 × 100 m relay	43.46
2021	European U23 Championships	Tallinn, Estonia	3rd	100 m	11.44
2021	European U23 Championships	Tallinn, Estonia	—	4 × 100 m relay	DNF

=== National championships and competitions ===
Year	Competition	Venue	Position	Event	Time
2015	England Indoor Championships, U17 events	Sheffield	—	60 m	7.85
2016	England Indoor Championships, U20 events	Sheffield	—	60 m	7.87
2016	England Championships, U20 events	Bedford	—	100 m	12.30
2017	England Indoor Championships, U20 events	Sheffield	4th	60 m	7.51
2017	England Championships, U20 events	Bedford	1st	100 m	11.61
2018	British Indoor Championships	Birmingham	5th	60 m	7.36
2018	England Indoor Championships, U20 events	Sheffield	3rd	60 m	7.48
2018	England Championships, U20 events	Bedford	1st	100 m	11.50
2018	England Championships, U20 events	Bedford	—	200 m	23.66
2019	British Indoor Championships	Birmingham	3rd	60 m	7.35
2019	England Championships, U20 events	Bedford	1st	100 m	11.61
2019	England Championships, U20 events	Bedford	1st	200 m	23.24
2019	British Championships	Birmingham	4th	100 m	11.40
2019	British Championships	Birmingham	4th	200 m	23.36
2020	British Championships	Manchester	2nd	100 m	11.34
2020	British Championships	Manchester	—	200 m	DQ
2021	England Championships, U23 events	Bedford	1st	100 m	11.67
2021	England Championships, U23 events	Bedford	1st	200 m	23.24
2021	British Championships	Manchester	4th	100 m	11.23
2021	British Championships	Manchester	8th	200 m	23.82
2023	British Championships	Manchester	4th	100 m	11.54
2023	British Championships	Manchester	7th	200 m	23.32
2024	British Championships	Manchester	—	100 m	DQ
2024	England Championships, U23 events	Birmingham	2nd	100 m	11.82
2024	England Championships, U23 events	Birmingham	2nd	200 m	23.97
2025	British Championships	Birmingham	—	100 m	11.58
2026	British Championships	Birmingham	8th	100 m	11.46
2026	British Championships	Birmingham	3rd	200 m	22.99
