= Aleeya Sibbons =

British athlete (born 2002)

Personal information
- Born: 5 November 2002 (age 23)
- Height: 180 cm (5 ft 11 in)

Sport
- Sport: Athletics
- Event: Sprint

Achievements and titles
- Personal bests: 60 m: 7.24 (Birmingham, 2026); 100 m: 11.21 (London, 2026); 200 m: 22.98 (London, 2025)
Medal record
Women's athletics
Representing Great Britain
World Relays
Bronze medal – third place	2024 Nassau	4 × 100 m relay
European U23 Championships
Gold medal – first place	2023 Espoo	4 × 100 m relay
European Athletics U20 Championships
Gold medal – first place	2021 Tallinn	4 × 100 m relay

Aleeya Sibbons (born 5 November 2002) is a track and field athlete who competes internationally for Great Britain as a sprinter.

== Early life ==
From Barking & Dagenham, she attended Eastbury Community School. She won gold in the U15 100 metres at the English Schools Championships in 2017. She began a degree in Architecture at the University of Bath in 2021.

== Career ==
Sibbons was a member of the gold medal winning 4 × 100 m team at the European Athletics U20 Championships in Tallinn in 2021. A member of the Newham & Essex Beagles, she won the British Universities and College (BUCS) 100 metres title in May 2022, in a time of 11.70 seconds. At the same event, she won gold in the women's 4 × 100 m relay.

Sibbons won the 100 m title at the 2023 England Athletics U23 Championships in Chelmsford, running a time of 11.46 seconds. She was selected as part of the British squad for the 2023 European Games in Silesia. She was a member of the gold medal winning inning 4 × 100 m team at the European Athletics U23 Championships in Espoo in 2023.

In April 2024, Sibbons was selected as part of the British team for the 2024 World Athletics Relays in Nassau, Bahamas. She ran as part of the Women's 4 × 100 metres team which finished third overall. She lowered her 200 m personal best to 23.35 seconds at the 2024 Loughborough International in May 2024. In June 2024, she was selected for the British team for the 2024 European Athletics Championships in Rome. In November 2024, she was named by British Athletics on the Olympic Futures Programme for 2025.

Sibbons was selected for the 100 metres at the 2025 European Athletics Team Championships in Madrid in June 2025, placing tenth overall in 11.37 seconds. She also ran as part of the British 4 x 100 metres relay team which placed eighth overall. In October 2025, she was retained on the British Athletics Olympic Futures Programme for 2025/26.

In January 2026, Sibbons ran a personal best for the 60 metres of 7.32 seconds at the EAP Glasgow. She placed third in the final of the 60 metres at the 2026 British Indoor Athletics Championships in Birmingham on 14 February 2026, finishing behind Dina Asher-Smith and Amy Hunt, running a personal best 7.29 seconds in the final.

Sibbons was named in the British squad for the 4 x 100 metres relay at the 2026 World Athletics Relays in Gaborone, Botswana, competing in the women's 4 x 100 m relay as the team qualified for the 2027 World Championships. In July, she won in 23.33 seconds ahead of Sophie Becker at the Cork City Sports in Ireland. She was selected to represent England at the 2026 Commonwealth Games in Glasgow, and competed in the women's 4 × 100 m relay.

== Athletics achievements ==
=== Personal bests ===
Type	Distance	Time (s)	Wind (m/s)	Venue	Date	Notes
Individual events
Indoor	60 metres	7.24	—N/a	Birmingham, United Kingdom	14 February 2026	
Indoor	200 metres sh	23.96	—N/a	London, United Kingdom	5 February 2023	
Outdoor	100 metres	11.18	+1.6	London, United Kingdom	12 July 2026	
Outdoor	200 metres	22.98	+1.1	London, United Kingdom	20 July 2025	
Team events
Outdoor	4 × 100 metres relay	42.80	—N/a	Nassau, The Bahamas	5 May 2024	

=== International competitions ===
Representing Great Britain & Scotland
Year	Competition	Venue	Position	Event	Time
2021	European U20 Championships	Tallinn, Estonia	9th (sf)	100 m	11.65
2021	European U20 Championships	Tallinn, Estonia	1st	4 × 100 m relay	44.95
2023	2023 European Team Championships First Division	Chorzów, Poland	—	4 × 100 m relay	DQ
2023	European U23 Championships	Espoo, Finland	9th (sf)	100 m	11.42
2023	European U23 Championships	Espoo, Finland	1st	4 × 100 m relay	43.04
2024	World Relays	Nassau, The Bahamas	3rd	4 × 100 m relay	42.80
2025	European Team Championships First Division	Madrid, Spain	11th	100 m	11.37
2025	European Team Championships First Division	Madrid, Spain	8th	4 × 100 m relay	43.00
2026	World Relays	Gaborone, Botswana	—	4 × 100 m relay	DQ (Re)
2026	World Relays	Gaborone, Botswana	2nd	4 × 100 m relay	42.90 (WQ)
2026	Commonwealth Games	Glasgow, United Kingdom	5th	4 × 100 m relay	43.45

=== National championships and competitions ===
Year	Competition	Venue	Position	Event	Time
2016	England Indoor Championships, U15 events	Sheffield	7th	60 m	8.10
2017	England Indoor Championships, U15 events	Sheffield	—	60 m	7.99
2017	England Championships, U15 events	Bedford	8th	100 m	12.64
2019	England Championships, U17 events	Bedford	1st	100 m	11.90
2020	British Championships	Manchester	8th	100 m	12.06
2021	England Championships, U20 events	Bedford	6th	100 m	12.15
2023	British Indoor Championships	Birmingham	—	200 m	DNS
2024	British Championships	Manchester	7th	100 m	11.87
2026	British Indoor Championships	Birmingham	3rd	60 m	7.29
2026	British Championships	Birmingham	—	100 m	11.47
