= Sacha Alessandrini =

French hurdler (born 1999)

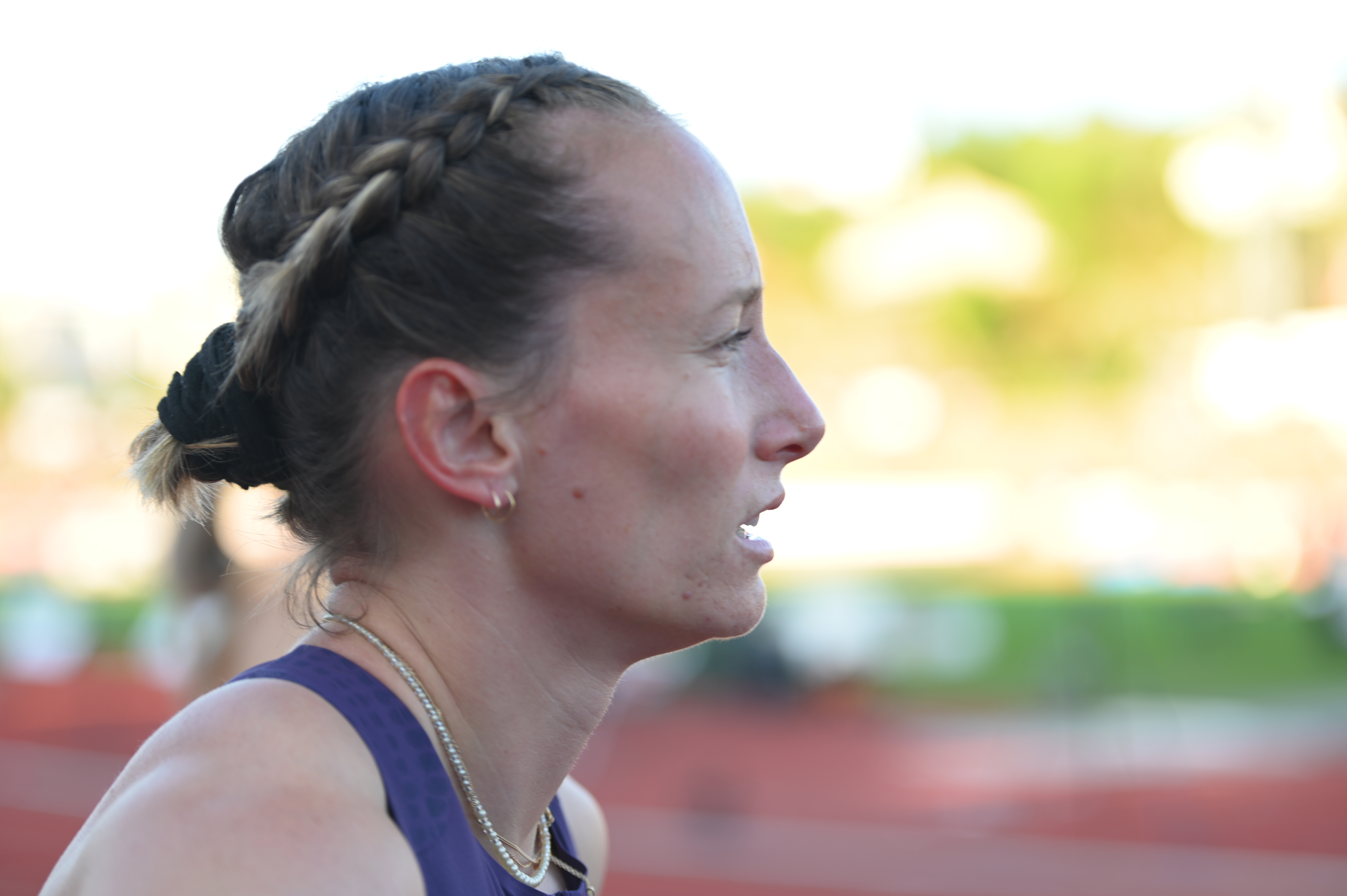
- Alessandrini in 2026

Personal information
- Born: 7 June 1999 (age 27) Nantes, France
- Height: 167 cm (5 ft 6 in)
- Weight: 50 kg (110 lb)

Sport
- Country: France
- Sport: Athletics
- Event: Hurdles

Achievements and titles
- Personal bests: 100m hurdles: 12.70 (2025); 60m hurdles: 7.93 (2026)
Medal record
Women's athletics
Representing France
European U23 Championships
Bronze medal – third place	2021 Tallinn	4x100m relay
Mediterranean Games
Bronze medal – third place	2026 Taranto	100 m hurdles

Sacha Alessandrini (born 7 June 1999) is a French hurdler who has won French national titles over 100 metres hurdles and indoors over 60 metres hurdles.

== Biography ==
She is from Nice, France and is a member of Nice Côte d'Azur Athlétisme. She won the French Indoor Athletics Championships over 60 metres hurdles in Miramas in 2019. That year, she placed fourth at the 2019 European Athletics U23 Championships in Gävle, Sweden.

She won a bronze medal in the 4 x 100 metres relay at the 2021 European Athletics U23 Championships in Tallinn, Estonia.

She set a new personal best for the 60 metres hurdles in Miramas in January 2025, running 7.99 seconds. In March 2025, she reached the semi-finals of the 60m hurdles at the 2025 European Athletics Indoor Championships in Apeldoorn, Netherlands, where she ran a time of 8.08 seconds having run 8.05 seconds in her preliminary heat.

She finished eighth at the 2025 Meeting International Mohammed VI d'Athlétisme de Rabat, part of the 2025 Diamond League, in a season's best 12.96 seconds. She won the French Athletics Championships over 100 metres hurdles in Talence in August 2025. In September, she was a semi-finalist at the 2025 World Athletics Championships in Tokyo, Japan.

In January 2026, she won the 60 metres hurdles in 8.00 seconds at the CMCM Indoor Meeting in Luxembourg, a silver meeting on the 2026 World Athletics Indoor Tour. The following month she set a new personal best of 7.95 seconds in Karlsruhe, Germany. She was runner-up in the 60 metres hurdles to Laëticia Bapté at the 2026 French Indoor Athletics Championships in Aubiere running a personal best 7.93 seconds. In March 2026, she was a semi-finalist in the 60 metres hurdles at the 2026 World Athletics Indoor Championships in Toruń, Poland. In May, she equalled her personal best in the 100 metres hurdles at the 2026 Meeting International Mohammed VI d'Athlétisme de Rabat. On 25 July 2026, she won the 100 metres hurdles at the 2026 French Championships. In August 2026, she competed at the 2026 European Athletics Championships in Birmingham, England, in the women's 100 metres hurdles, reaching the finals and placing sixth overall.
