= Lilly Kaden =

German sprinter (born 2001)

Personal information
- Nationality: Germany
- Born: 6 September 2001 (age 24)
- Home town: Winterbach, Baden-Württemberg, Germany
- Education: Westphalian University of Applied Sciences Gelsenkirchen Bocholt Recklinghausen
- Height: 158 cm (5 ft 2 in)

Sport
- Sport: Athletics
- Events: 100 metres 200 metres
- Club: LG Olympia Dortmund
- Coached by: Thomas Kremer; Thomas Czarnetzki

Achievements and titles
- National finals: 2016 German U16s; • 100m, 3rd (bronze); 2019 German U20s; • 100m, 4th; 2020 German Champs; • 100m, 6th; • 200m, 8th; 2020 German U20s; • 100m, 1st (gold); 2021 German Champs; • 200m, 6th; 2021 German U23s; • 100m, 2nd (silver); 2022 German Indoors; • 60m, 8th; • 200m, 3rd (bronze)
- Personal bests: 100m: 11.28 (+1.3) (2021); 200m: 23.21 (+0.6) (2022)
Medal record
Women's athletics
Representing Germany
European U23 Championships
Gold medal – first place	2021 Tallinn	100 m
Gold medal – first place	2021 Tallinn	4 × 100 m relay
- Updated on 29 December 2023

Lilly Kaden (born 6 September 2001) is a German sprinter. She won double gold medals at the 2021 European Athletics U23 Championships, in the 100 m and 4 × 100 m relay.

== Biography ==
Kaden is from Winterbach, Baden-Württemberg where she started competing in athletics at the age of 7. Her grandfather Paul Ivanfi was a noted high jumper. She was initially a member of the FC Schalke 04 athletics club, but when the head coach Timo Krampen changed careers in 2020, Kaden switched to the LG Olympia Dortmund club coached by Thomas Kremer and sprint specialist Thomas Czarnetzki. She studied at the Westphalian University of Applied Sciences Gelsenkirchen Bocholt Recklinghausen in Gelsenkirchen.

In July 2021, Kaden won double gold at the 2021 European Athletics U23 Championships, in the 100 m and 4 × 100 m events.

In August 2021, Kaden was featured in the German TV program "Lokalzeit aus Dortmund".

In 2022, Kaden was injured at the Sparkassen Gala in Regensburg. Despite a partial recovery and meeting the performance standard, she had to miss the 2022 World Athletics Championships due to a related thigh injury.

Kaden competed in the 2023 European Athletics U23 Championships in both the 100 m and 4 × 100 m events again, but she did not advance out of the semifinals in the 100 m and the German team finished 4th in the relay.

== Statistics ==
=== Personal bests ===
Event	Mark	Place	Competition	Venue	Date	Ref
100 metres	11.28 (+1.3 m/s)	(gold) (semifinal #3)	European Athletics U23 Championships	Tallinn, Estonia	8 July 2021	
200 metres	23.21 (+0.6 m/s)	(gold) (round B)	PURE Athletics Global Invitational	Clermont, Florida	1 May 2022	
