= Tamari Davis =

American sprinter (born 2003)

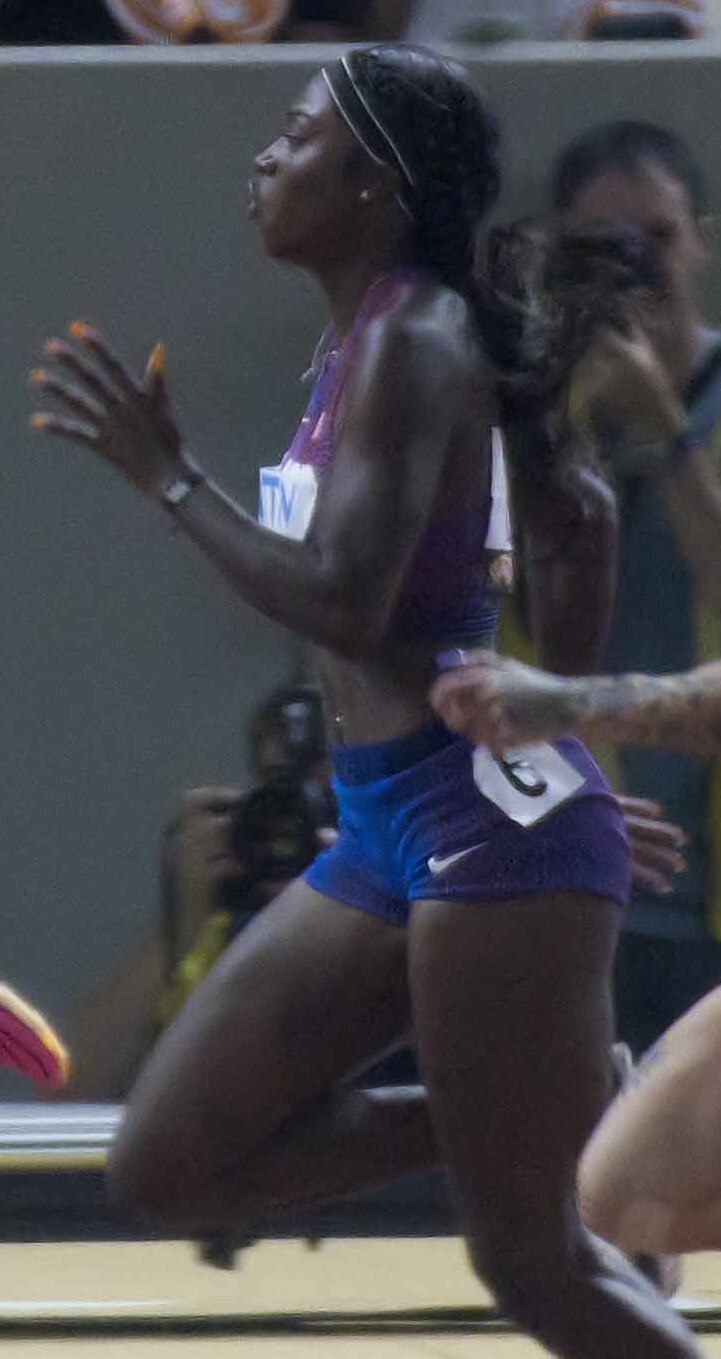
- Tamari Davis in 2023

Personal information
- Born: February 15, 2003 (age 23) Gainesville, Florida, U.S.
- Education: Gainesville High School

Sport
- Country: United States
- Sport: Athletics
- Events: 100 m, 200 m
- Club: Empire Athletics (adidas)
- Coached by: Gary Evans

Achievements and titles
- Personal bests: Outdoor; 100 m: 10.83 (Memphis, TN 2022); 200 m: 22.05 (Miami, 2025); Indoor; 60 m: 7.07 (South Carolina 2023); 200 m: 22.81 (South Carolina 2023)
Medal record
Women's athletics
Representing the United States
World Championships
Gold medal – first place	2023 Budapest	4 × 100 m relay
World Relays
Gold medal – first place	2024 Nassau	4 × 100 m relay

Tamari Davis (born February 15, 2003) is an American track and field athlete who competes as a sprinter.

== Early life ==
A native of Gainesville, Florida, Davis attended Gainesville High School, and Oak Hall School. On January 30, 2020, at the age of 16, Tamari signed a professional contract with Adidas.

== Career ==
In her sixth race as a professional, in February 2021, she lowered her career best at 60 metres down to 7.18 seconds, at the East Coast Invitational beating an international field including Veronica Campbell-Brown. Davis’ previous best was 7.19 from 2020 which was the world best U18 time. On July 24, 2020 in Clermont, Florida, Davis ran 100 m in 11.15 seconds which placed her 10th on the year list worldwide for 2020.

In 2022, at the US trials, she finished fourth in the 100 m. The following year, she improved on that, to finish third overall in the 100 m of the 2023 USA Outdoor Track and Field Championships held in Eugene, Oregon. She was selected for the 2023 World Athletics Championships in Budapest in August 2023, she qualified for the final of the 100 metres and finished in ninth place.

In April 2024, she was selected as part of the American team for the 2024 World Athletics Relays in Nassau, Bahamas. In May 2024, she finished runner-up in the 100 metres at the 2024 Doha Diamond League. On July 12, 2024, she finished second in the 100 metres in 10.99 seconds at the 2024 Herculis Diamond League event in Monaco. She was included in the a United States relay pool for the 2024 Paris Olympics.

At the Grand Slam Track in Miami on 2 May 2025, she ran a wind-assisted 10.79 metres for the 100 metres to finish second in the race in the short sprints category behind Melissa Jefferson-Wooden. The following month she finished runner-up to Jefferson-Wooden again at the 2025 Philadelphia Slam in the 100 metres. She reached the semi-finals of the 100 metres at the 2025 USA Outdoor Track and Field Championships, running her heat in 11.18 seconds (-1.5 m/s). After running her semi-final in 10.96 seconds (+1.1) she returned to place fifth in the final in 10.97 (+0.4).

Davis won the 100 in 11.08 seconds (+0.5) at the LA Track Fest on 23 May 2026. Davis won the 100 metres on 10 July in Memphis, Tennessee at the Ed Murphey Classic. On 24 July, Davis placed third in 11.00 seconds in the final of the 100 metres at the 2026 USA Championships. In September, she competed over 100 m at the inaugural World Ultimate Championship in Budapest.

== Athletics achievements ==
Information from her World Athletics profile unless otherwise noted.

=== Personal bests ===
Type	Distance	Time (s)	Wind (m/s)	Venue	Date	Notes
Individual events
Indoor	60 metres	7.08	—N/a	New York, United States	11 February 2023	
Indoor	200 metres sh	23.24	—N/a	New York, United States	10 March 2018	
Indoor	300 metres sh	37.79	—N/a	Clemson, United States	31 January 2025	
Outdoor	100 metres	10.83	+0.6	Memphis, United States	30 July 2022	
Outdoor	200 metres	22.05	+1.1	Miramar, United States	3 May 2025	
Outdoor	400 metres	55.83	—N/a	Jacksonville, United States	23 March 2019	
Team events
Indoor	4 × 400 metres relay sh	3:32.43	—N/a	Clemson, United States	1 February 2025	
Outdoor	4 × 100 metres relay	41.03	—N/a	Budapest, Hungary	26 August 2023	
Outdoor	4 × 400 metres relay	3:26.39	—N/a	Austin, United States	29 March 2025	

=== International competitions ===
Representing the United States
Year	Competition	Venue	Position	Event	Time	Notes
2023	World Championships	Budapest, Hungary	9th	100 m	11.03	
2023	World Championships	Budapest, Hungary	1st	4 × 100 m relay	41.03	CR
2024	World Relays	Nassau, The Bahamas	1st	4 × 100 m relay	41.85	CR WL
2026	World Ultimate Championship	Budapest, Hungary	9th (sf)	100 m	11.10	

=== Circuit performances ===
Grand Slam Track results
Slam	Race group	Event	Pl.	Time	Prize money
2025 Miami Slam	Short sprints	100 m	2nd	10.79	US$30,000
2025 Miami Slam	Short sprints	200 m	2nd	22.05	US$30,000
2025 Philadelphia Slam	Short sprints	200 m	3rd	22.59	US$50,000
2025 Philadelphia Slam	Short sprints	100 m	2nd	11.03	US$50,000
