= Marie-Ange Rimlinger =

French sprinter (born 2001)

Personal information
- Nationality: French
- Born: 31 December 2001 (age 24) Lomé, Togo
- Height: 165 cm (5 ft 5 in)
- Weight: 55 kg (121 lb)

Sport
- Country: France
- Sport: Athletics
- Event: Sprint
- Club: US Forbach Athletics
- Coached by: Dimitri Demonière

Achievements and titles
- Personal bests: 60m: 7.31 (Metz, 2025); 100m: 11.36 (Espoo, 2023); 200m: 23.62 (Cergy-Pontoise, 2021)
Medal record
Women's athletics
Representing France
European U23 Championships
Silver medal – second place	2023 Espoo	4×100 m relay
Bronze medal – third place	2021 Tallinn	4x100m relay

Marie-Ange Rimlinger (born 31 December 2001) is a French sprinter.

== Biography ==
Rimlinger is a member of US Forbach Athletics in the Lorraine region of France. She won a bronze medal in the women's 4 x 100 metres relay at the 2021 European Athletics U23 Championships in Tallinn, Estonia.

She won a silver medal in the women's 4 x 100 metres relay at the 2023 European Athletics U23 Championships in Espoo, Finland. She travelled with the French team for the relay pool at the 2023 World Athletics Championships in Budapest, Hungary.

She competed at the 2025 World Athletics Relays in China in the Women's 4 × 100 metres relay in May 2025 as the French team won the repechage round to ensure qualification for the upcoming world championships, running alongside Sarah Richard, Chloé Galet and Helene Parisot. She was subsequently selected for the French team for the 2025 World Athletics Championships in Tokyo, Japan, running as part of the French women's 4 x 100 metres relay team which qualified for the final and placed sixth overall.

Rimlinger was selected as part of the French team for the 2026 World Athletics Relays in Gaborone, Botswana.
