= Mallory Leconte =

French sprinter (born 2000)

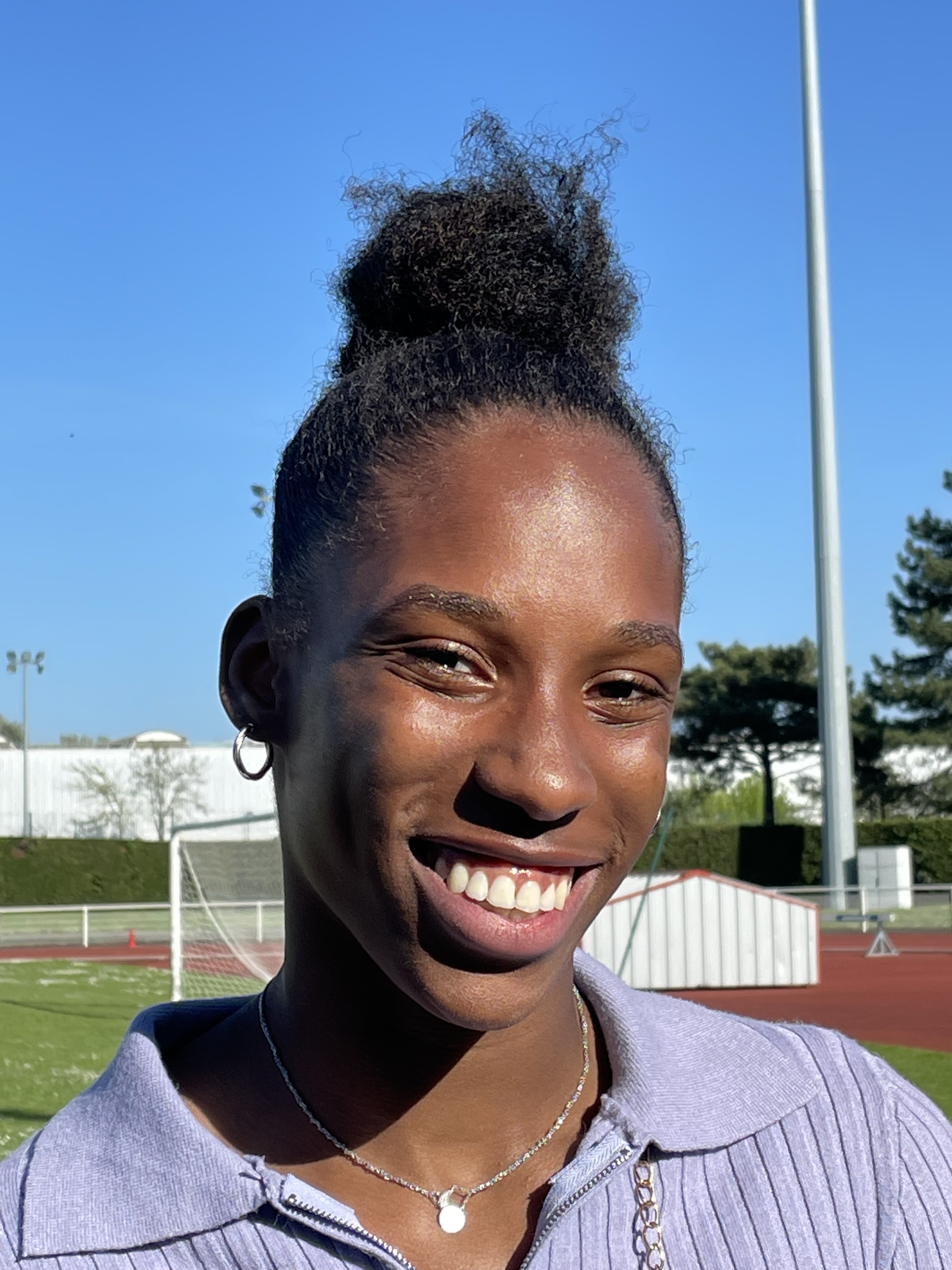
- Leconte in 2022

Personal information
- Nationality: French
- Born: 4 October 2000 (age 26)
- Height: 172 cm (5 ft 8 in)

Sport
- Sport: Athletics
- Event: Sprint

Achievements and titles
- Personal bests: 60m: 7.26 (Mondeville, 2023); 100m: 11.23 (Albi, 2023)
Medal record
Women's athletics
Representing France
World Relays
Silver medal – second place	2024 Nassau	4×100 m relay
European U23 Championships
Bronze medal – third place	2021 Tallinn	4x100m relay

Mallory Leconte (born 4 October 2000) is a French sprinter. She is a multiple-time French national champion over 100 metres and 60 metres.

== Early life ==
Leconte and her twin brother Jerry were both talent spotted at school and joined Saint-Denis Emotion athletics club in 2011.

== Career ==
Leconte was a bronze medalist in the 4 x 100 metres relay at the 2021 European Athletics U23 Championships in Tallinn, Estonia.

She won her first senior national at the title French Indoor Athletics Championships in February 2022 in the 60 metres, running a personal best time of 7.34 seconds. She won the 2022 French Athletics Championships 100 metres title outdoors in Caen in June 2022. She raced at the 2022 European Championships in Munich, Germany, where she reached the semi-final of the 100 meters. She also ran as part of the French relay team in the 4 × 100 m at the that qualified for the final.

She retained her national title at the 2023 French Athletics Championships in the 100 metres in Albi, with a personal best time of 11.23 seconds. She ran for France at the 2023 World Athletics Championships in Budapest in the women’s 4 x 100 metres relay.

She ran as part of the French 4 × 100 m relay team which finished as runner-up and qualified for the 2024 Paris Olympics at the 2024 2024 World Relays Championships in Nassau, Bahamas.

== Personal life ==
From Saint-Denis, she attended Paris Nanterre University She was employed as an ambassador for the Seine-Saint-Denis local council and from the Île-de-France region in Paris, to attend local schools and talk to school children prior to the 2024 Olympic Games in Paris.
