= 2021 European Athletics U23 Championships =

- Dates: 8–11 July
- Host city: Tallinn, Estonia
- Venue: Kadriorg Stadium
- Level: Under 23
- Type: Outdoor
- Events: 44
- Participation: 1162 athletes from 48 nations

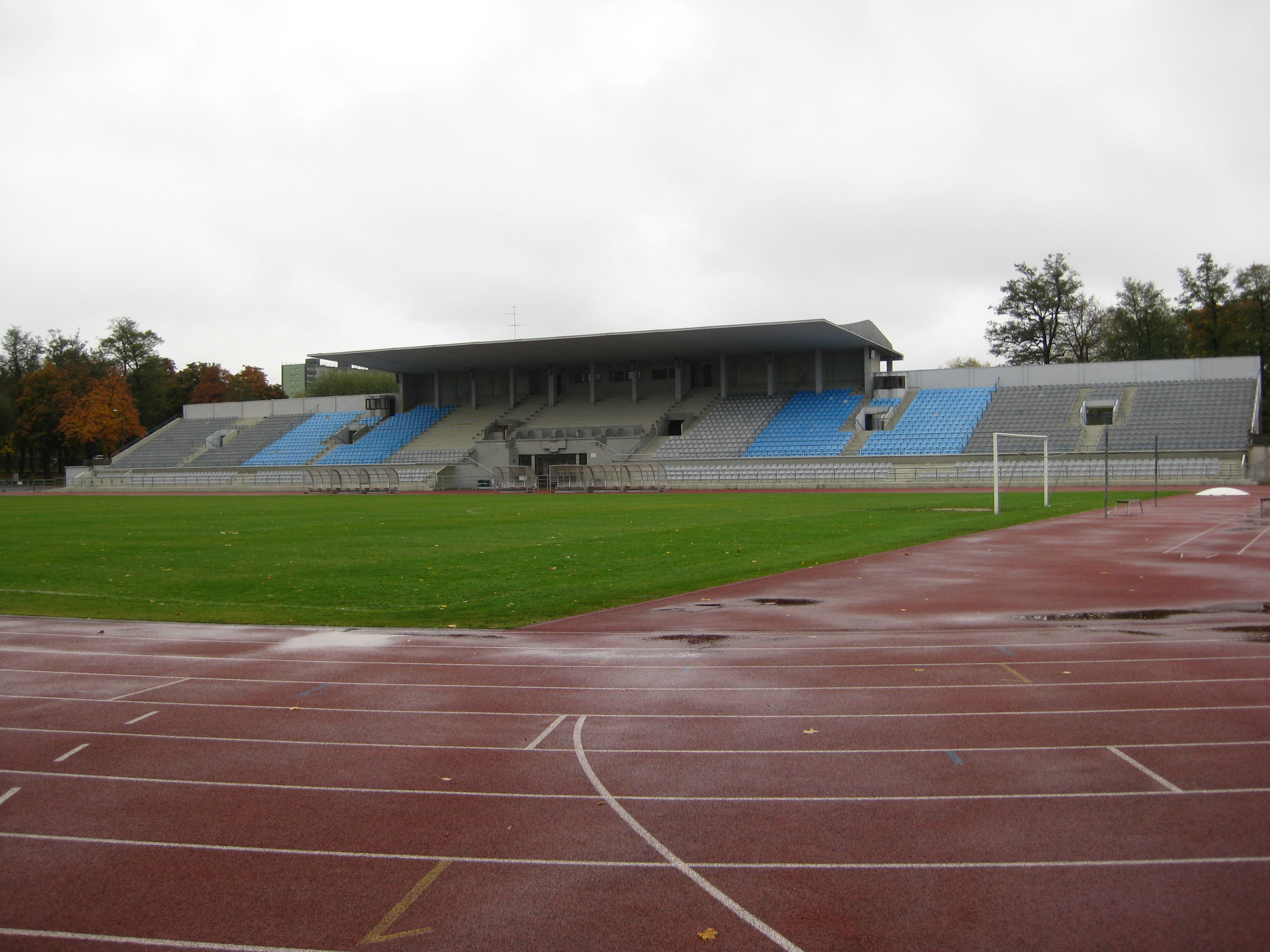

The 2021 European Athletics U23 Championships were the 13th edition of the biennial athletics competition between European athletes under the age of twenty-three. It was planned to be held in Bergen, Norway from 8 to 11 July., but this venue was cancelled for Covid pandemic reasons. Initially it was intended that the event would be postponed and held in another venue after the 2020 Olympic Games. Eventually the original dates were retained, and Tallinn, Estonia was chosen as the venue. This meant that Tallinn hosted two age-group championships in successive weeks: after the European Athletics U23 Championships, the Kadriorg Stadium also hosted between 15 and 18 July the European Athletics U20 Championships. For the first time in 13 editions, Italian team topped the medal table.

== Medal table ==
* Host nation (Estonia)

| Rank | Nation | Gold | Silver | Bronze | Total |
|---|---|---|---|---|---|
| 1 | Italy (ITA) | 6 | 5 | 2 | 13 |
| 2 | Germany (GER) | 6 | 4 | 2 | 12 |
| 3 | Czech Republic (CZE) | 4 | 1 | 0 | 5 |
| 4 | Spain (ESP) | 3 | 7 | 5 | 15 |
| 5 | France (FRA) | 3 | 6 | 8 | 17 |
| 6 | Netherlands (NED) | 3 | 1 | 2 | 6 |
| 7 | Switzerland (SUI) | 3 | 0 | 2 | 5 |
| 8 | Turkey (TUR) | 2 | 2 | 1 | 5 |
| 9 | Great Britain (GBR) | 2 | 1 | 5 | 8 |
| 10 | Poland (POL) | 2 | 1 | 2 | 5 |
| 11 | Belarus (BLR) | 2 | 1 | 0 | 3 |
| 12 | Ukraine (UKR) | 2 | 0 | 1 | 3 |
| 13 | Hungary (HUN) | 2 | 0 | 0 | 2 |
| 14 | Belgium (BEL) | 1 | 4 | 0 | 5 |
| 15 | Finland (FIN) | 1 | 1 | 1 | 3 |
| 15 | Slovenia (SLO) | 1 | 1 | 1 | 3 |
| 17 | Slovakia (SVK) | 1 | 0 | 0 | 1 |
| 18 | Greece (GRE) | 0 | 3 | 1 | 4 |
| 19 | Sweden (SWE) | 0 | 2 | 4 | 6 |
| 20 | Portugal (POR) | 0 | 2 | 1 | 3 |
| 21 | Norway (NOR) | 0 | 1 | 2 | 3 |
| 22 | Denmark (DEN) | 0 | 1 | 0 | 1 |
| 22 | Ireland (IRL) | 0 | 1 | 0 | 1 |
| 24 | Andorra (AND) | 0 | 0 | 1 | 1 |
| 24 | Bulgaria (BUL) | 0 | 0 | 1 | 1 |
| 24 | Iceland (ISL) | 0 | 0 | 1 | 1 |
| 24 | Latvia (LAT) | 0 | 0 | 1 | 1 |
| Totals (27 entries) | | 44 | 45 | 44 | 133 |

== Medal summary ==
=== Men ===
==== Track ====
| Event | Gold | | Silver | | Bronze | |
|---|---|---|---|---|---|---|
| 100 metres | Jeremiah Azu; Great Britain | 10.25 | Henrik Larsson; Sweden | 10.36 | Arnau Monné; Spain | 10.41 |
| 200 metres | William Reais; Switzerland | 20.47 EU23L | Jesús Gómez; Spain | 20.60 PB | Pol Retamal; Spain | 20.76 |
| 400 metres | Ricky Petrucciani; Switzerland | 45.02 CR | Jonathan Sacoor; Belgium | 45.17 SB | Edoardo Scotti; Italy | 45.68 SB |
| 800 metres | Simone Barontini; Italy | 1:46.20 | Eliott Crestan; Belgium | 1:46.32 | Thomas Randolph; Great Britain | 1:46.41 PB |
| 1500 metres | Ruben Verheyden; Belgium | 3:40.03 | Mario García; Spain | 3:40.11 | Isaac Nader; Portugal | 3:40.58 |
| 5000 metres Final A and B summary | Mohamed Mohumed; Germany | 13:38.69 | Aarón Las Heras; Spain | 13:43.14 | Baldvin Magnússon; Iceland | 13:45.00 NR |
| 10,000 metres | Eduardo Menacho; Spain | 29:14.92 PB | Florian Le Pallec; France | 29:23.82 | Valentin Gondouin; France | 29:24.40 |
| 110 metres hurdles | Asier Martínez; Spain | 13.34 | Michael Obasuyi; Belgium | 13.40 | Enrique Llopis; Spain | 13.44 |
| 400 metres hurdles | Alessandro Sibilio; Italy | 48.42 EU23L | Emil Agyekum; Germany | 48.96 PB | Ramsey Angela; Netherlands | 49.07 PB |
| 3000 metres steeplechase | István Palkovits; Hungary | 8:34.05 | Etson Barros; Portugal | 8:38.00 PB | Nahuel Carabaña; Andorra | 8:39.17 |
| 4 × 100 metres relay | Yannick Wolf; Luis Brandner; Milo Skupin-Alfa; Joshua Hartmann; Germany | 38.70 EU23R | Arnau Monné; Pol Retamal; Jesús Gómez; Sergio López; Spain | 39.00 | Erik Kostrytsya; Andriy Vasyliev; Kyrylo Prykhodko; Vasyl Makukh; Ukraine | 39.45 |
| 4 × 400 metres relay | El-Mir Reale; Téo Andant; David Sombé; Ludovic Oucéni; Eddy Leech*; France | 3:05.01 EU23L | Alessandro Moscardi; Edoardo Scotti; Riccardo Meli; Alessandro Sibilio; Leonardo Puca*; Italy | 3:06.07 | Johannes Nortmeyer; Kevin Joite; Ben Zapka; Emil Agyekum; Arne Leppelsack*; Germany | 3:06.42 |
| 20 kilometres walk | José Manuel Pérez; Spain | 1:25:06 | David Kenny; Ireland | 1:25:50 | Andrea Cosi; Italy | 1:26:05 |

- Medalists who participated in heats only.

==== Field ====
| Event | Gold | | Silver | | Bronze | |
|---|---|---|---|---|---|---|
| High jump | Jan Štefela; Czech Republic | 2.20 PB | Nathan Ismar; France; Manuel Lando; Italy | 2.17 2.17 PB | not awarded | |
| Pole vault | Ethan Cormont; France | 5.80 =PB | Emmanouil Karalis; Greece | 5.65 | Sondre Guttormsen; Norway; Ersu Şaşma; Turkey | 5.60 |
| Long jump | Simon Ehammer; Switzerland | 8.10 SB | Henrik Flåtnes; Norway | 7.95 =NU23R | Boris Linkov; Bulgaria | 7.84 |
| Triple jump | Andrea Dallavalle; Italy | 17.05 | Enzo Hodebar; France | 16.99 PB | Anaël-Thomas Gogois; France | 16.65 |
| Shot put | Dzmitry Karpuk; Belarus | 20.33 | Alperen Karahan; Turkey | 19.75 | Odysseas Mouzenidis; Greece | 19.41 |
| Discus throw | Kristjan Čeh; Slovenia | 67.48 CR | Yauheni Bahutski; Belarus | 61.21 | Yasiel Sotero; Spain | 58.07 |
| Hammer throw | Mykhaylo Kokhan; Ukraine | 77.88 | Christos Frantzeskakis; Greece | 75.23 | Ragnar Carlsson; Sweden | 73.85 |
| Javelin throw | Topias Laine; Finland | 81.67 EU23L | Leandro Ramos; Portugal | 80.61 | Teura'itera'i Tupaia; France | 78.80 |

==== Combined ====
| Event | Gold | | Silver | | Bronze | |
|---|---|---|---|---|---|---|
| Decathlon | Andreas Bechmann; Germany | 8142 pts EU23L | Sven Roosen; Netherlands | 8056 pts PB (not legal) | Markus Rooth; Norway | 7967 pts NU23R |

=== Women ===
==== Track ====
| Event | Gold | | Silver | | Bronze | |
|---|---|---|---|---|---|---|
| 100 metres | Lilly Kaden; Germany | 11.36 | Rani Rosius; Belgium | 11.43 | Kristal Awuah; Great Britain | 11.44 |
| 200 metres | Dalia Kaddari; Italy | 22.64 EU23L | Sophia Junk; Germany | 22.87 PB | Gémima Joseph; France | 22.97 |
| 400 metres | Lada Vondrová; Czech Republic | 51.19 PB | Barbora Malíková; Czech Republic | 51.23 =PB | Silke Lemmens; Switzerland | 52.09 NU23R |
| 800 metres | Isabelle Boffey; Great Britain | 2:01.80 | Eloisa Coiro; Italy | 2:02.07 PB | Wilma Nielsen; Sweden | 2:02.29 PB |
| 1500 metres | Gaia Sabbatini; Italy | 4:13.98 | Marta Zenoni; Italy | 4:14.50 | Erin Wallace; Great Britain | 4:14.85 |
| 5000 metres | Nadia Battocletti; Italy | 15:37.4 h | Klara Lukan; Slovenia | 15:44.0 | Diane van Es; Netherlands | 15:48.4 |
| 10,000 metres | Jasmijn Lau; Netherlands | 32:30.49 EU23L | Anna Arnaudo; Italy | 32:40.43 PB | Lisa Oed; Germany | 33:35.99 PB |
| 100 metres hurdles | Pia Skrzyszowska; Poland | 12.77 PB | Cyréna Samba-Mayela; France | 12.80 | Klaudia Wojtunik; Poland | 12.97 PB |
| 400 metres hurdles | Emma Zapletalová; Slovakia | 54.28 CR NR | Sara Gallego; Spain | 55.20 NR | Yasmin Giger; Switzerland | 55.25 NU23R |
| 3000 metres steeplechase | Flavie Renouard; France | 9:51.02 | Kinga Królik; Poland | 9:52.59 | Aude Clavier; France | 9:58.58 |
| 4 × 100 metres relay | Lilly Kaden; Keshia Kwadwo; Sophia Junk; Talea Prepens; Germany | 43.05 CR | Aitana Rodrigo; Jaël Bestué; Eva Santidrián; Carmen Marco; Spain | 43.74 | Marie-Ange Rimlinger; Sacha Alessandrini; Wided Atatou; Mallory Leconte; France | 44.15 |
| 4 × 400 metres relay | Lada Vondrová; Nikoleta Jíchová; Barbora Veselá; Barbora Malíková; Czech Republic | 3:30.11 EU23L | Sokhna Lacoste; Louise Maraval; Camille Seri; Shana Grebo; France | 3:30.33 NU23R | Natalia Wosztyl; Aleksandra Formella; Karolina Łozowska; Kinga Gacka; Poland | 3:30.38 |
| 20 kilometres walk | Meryem Bekmez; Turkey | 1:33:08 | Pauline Stey; France | 1:34:47 PB | Antía Chamosa; Spain | 1:35:04 PB |

==== Field ====
| Event | Gold | | Silver | | Bronze | |
|---|---|---|---|---|---|---|
| High jump | Yaroslava Mahuchikh; Ukraine | 2.00 CR | Maja Nilsson; Sweden | 1.89 | Lia Apostolovski; Slovenia | 1.89 =SB |
| Pole vault | Amálie Švábíková; Czech Republic | 4.50 SB | Molly Caudery; Great Britain | 4.45 =SB | Lisa Gunnarsson; Sweden | 4.40 |
| Long jump | Petra Farkas; Hungary | 6.73 EU23L | Merle Homeier; Germany | 6.69 PB | Lucy Hadaway; Great Britain | 6.63 PB |
| Triple jump | Tuğba Danışmaz; Turkey | 14.09 NR | Spyridoula Karydi; Greece | 13.95 | Rūta Kate Lasmane; Latvia | 13.75 |
| Shot put | Jessica Schilder; Netherlands | 18.11 | Lea Riedel; Germany | 17.86 PB | Axelina Johansson; Sweden | 17.85 |
| Discus throw | Jorinde van Klinken; Netherlands | 63.02 | Helena Leveelahti; Finland | 57.09 PB | Amanda Ngandu-Ntumba; France | 56.24 |
| Hammer throw | Samantha Borutta; Germany | 68.80 | Katrine Koch Jacobsen; Denmark | 66.81 | Kiira Väänänen; Finland | 65.98 PB |
| Javelin throw | Aliaksandra Konshyna; Belarus | 59.14 PB | Münevver Hancı; Turkey | 57.37 | Jöna Aigouy; France | 55.82 |

==== Combined ====
| Event | Gold | | Silver | | Bronze | |
|---|---|---|---|---|---|---|
| Heptathlon | Adrianna Sułek; Poland | 6305 pts | Claudia Conte; Spain | 6186 pts PB | Holly Mills; Great Britain | 6095 pts |

== Placing table ==
Results:

| Rank | Team | Points |
|---|---|---|
| 1 | France | 191.5 |
| 2 | Spain | 151 |
| 3 | Italy | 147.5 |
| 4 | Germany | 147.5 |
| 5 | Great Britain | 137 |
| 6 | Poland | 77.5 |
| 7 | Netherlands | 67 |
| 8 | Turkey | 54.5 |
| 9 | Switzerland | 50.5 |
| 10 | Finland | 48 |

| Rank | Team | Points |
|---|---|---|
| 11 | Sweden | 48 |
| 12 | Belgium | 46.5 |
| 13 | Ukraine | 46 |
| 14 | Czech Republic | 43 |
| 15 | Belarus | 41 |
| 16 | Greece | 38 |
| 17 | Slovenia | 33 |
| 18 | Norway | 32.5 |
| 19 | Hungary | 27 |
| 20 | Portugal | 24 |

== Participation ==
1162 athletes from 48 nations competed at this edition.

- Andorra (2)
- Armenia (2)
- Austria (15)
- Authorised Neutral Athletes (1)
- Azerbaijan (1)
- Belarus (33)
- Belgium (26)
- Bosnia and Herzegovina (3)
- Bulgaria (10)
- Croatia (7)
- Cyprus (5)
- Czech Republic (51)
- Denmark (21)
- Estonia (26)
- Finland (40)
- France (71)
- Georgia (2)
- Germany (66)
- Great Britain (56)
- Greece (39)
- Hungary (30)
- Iceland (5)
- Ireland (30)
- Israel (12)
- Italy (81)
- Kosovo (1)
- Latvia (12)
- Lithuania (19)
- Luxembourg (2)
- Malta (2)
- Moldova (2)
- Monaco (1)
- Montenegro (1)
- Netherlands (29)
- North Macedonia (2)
- Norway (32)
- Poland (54)
- Portugal (30)
- Romania (20)
- San Marino (2)
- Serbia (12)
- Slovakia (18)
- Slovenia (22)
- Spain (70)
- Sweden (45)
- Switzerland (44)
- Turkey (49)
- Ukraine (58)

== Records and leading marks broken ==
- Men's 100m, Riku Illukka (FIN), 10.26 (NU23R)
- Men's 200m, William Reais (SUI), 20.47 (EU23L), 20.55 (NU23R)
- Men's 200m, Onyema Adigida (NED), 20.62 (NU23R)
- Men's 200m, Francesco Sansovini (SMR), 22.07 (NU23R)
- Men's 400m, Ricky Petrucciani (SUI), 45,02 (CR, EU23L, NU23R)
- Men's 110m Hurdles, Filip Demšar (SLO), 13.84 (NU23R)
- Men's 400m Hurdles, Alessandro Sibilio (ITA), 48.42 (EU23L, NU23R)
- Men's Discus Throw, Kristjan Čeh (SLO), 65,59 m then 67.48 m (CR)
- Men's Javelin Throw, Topias Laine (FIN), 81,67 m (EU23L)
- Men's Decathlon, Andreas Bechmann (GER), 8142 pts (EU23L)
- Men's Decathlon, Dario Dester (ITA), 7.936 points (NU23R)
- Men's Decathlon, Markus Rooth (NOR), 7967 pts (NU23R)
- Men's Decathlon, Fran Bonifačić (CRO), 7760 pts (NR)

- Women's 100m, Patrizia van der Weken (LUX), 11.50 (NU23R)
- Women's 100m, Mizgin Ay (TUR), 11.55 (NU23R)
- Women's 200m, Dalia Kaddari (ITA), 22.64 (EU23L)
- Women's 400m, Silke Lemmens (SUI), 52.73 (NU23R)
- Women's 400m Hurdles, Emma Zapletalová (SVK), 54.28 (CR, NU23R)
- Women's 400m Hurdles, Sara Gallego (ESP), 55.20 (NU23R)
- Women's 400m Hurdles, Viivi Lehikoinen (FIN), 55.42 (NU23R)
- Women's 400m Hurdles, Yasmin Giger (SUI), 55.25 (NU23R)
- Women's 400m Hurdles, Marie-Charlotte Gastaud (MON), 1:04.94 (NU23R)
- Women's 400m Hurdles, Beatrice Berti (SMR), 1:02.03 (NU23R)
- Women's Triple Jump, Tugba Danismaz (TUR), 14,09 m (NU23R)
- Women's High Jump, Yaroslava Mahuchikh (UKR), 2,00 m (CR)
- Women's 10,000m, Jasmijn Lau (NED), 32:30.49 (EU23L)
