= Magdalena Stefanowicz =

Polish sprinter (born 2000)

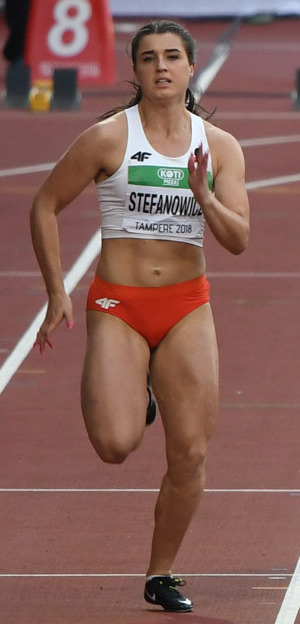
- Stefanowicz in 2018

Personal information
- Full name: Magdalena Anita Stefanowicz
- Nationality: Polish
- Born: 21 April 2000 (age 26)
- Education: Academy of Physical Education Katowice

Sport
- Sport: Athletics
- Event: 100 metres
- Club: MKS-MOSM Bytom
- Coached by: Krzysztof Kotuła
Medal record
Women's athletics
Representing Poland
World Relays
Silver medal – second place	2021 Chorzów	4 × 100 m relay
European Championships
Silver medal – second place	2022 Munich	4 × 100 m relay
Bronze medal – third place	2026 Birmingham	4 × 100 m relay
European Games
Silver medal – second place	2023 Kraków-Małopolska	4 × 100 m relay
Summer World University Games
Silver medal – second place	2025 Bochum	100 m
World U18 Championships
Silver medal – second place	2017 Nairobi	100 m

Magdalena Anita Stefanowicz (born 21 September 2000) is a Polish sprinter specialising in the 100 metres. She is a World Relays, European Championships and a European Games silver medallist in the 4 × 100 m relays.

Stefanowicz was the 100 m silver medallist at the 2017 World Under-18 Championships. She also competed for Poland at the 2024 Summer Olympics. Her personal best in the 60 m is 7.26 seconds (Toruń 2023) and in the 100 m is 11.35 seconds (+0.7 m/s, Copenhagen 2022).
