= Melissa Gutschmidt =

Swiss athlete (born 2002)

Personal information
- Nationality: Switzerland
- Born: January 7, 2002 (age 24)

Sport
- Sport: Track and field
- Event: Sprint
- Updated on 4 March 2024

Melissa Gutschmidt (born 7 January 2002) is a Swiss track and field athlete who specialises in the 100 metres.

== Career ==
Gutschmidt gained her first international experience in 2018, finishing sixth in the 100 metres at the European Under-18 Championships in Győr. She also competed at the 2018 Summer Youth Olympics in Buenos Aires.

In 2021, she won the bronze medal in the 100 metres at the World Under-20 Championships in Nairobi, finishing in 11.51 seconds.

In 2023, she won two bronze medals at the European Under-23 Championships in Espoo, in the 100 metres and the 4 × 100 metres relay.

She has represented Switzerland at senior international level, including the European Championships in Munich and the World Championships in Budapest.

== Personal bests ==
- 100 metres – 11.20 seconds (Bellinzona, 29 July 2023)
- 60 metres (indoor) – 7.20 seconds (17 February 2024)
