= Femke Broeders-Bol =

Dutch hurdler and sprinter (born 2000)

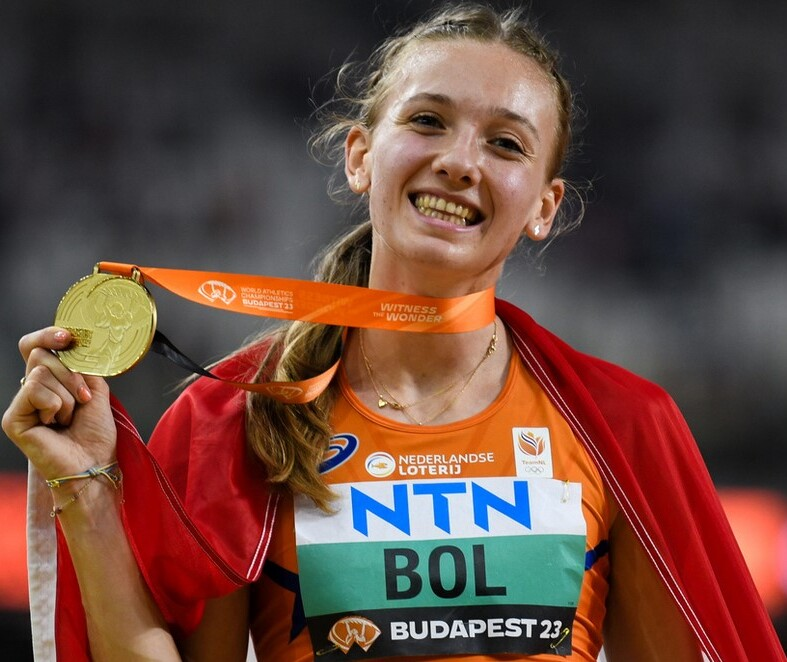
- Bol with her gold 400 m hurdles medal at the 2023 World Championships in Budapest

Personal information
- Born: Femke Bol; 23 February 2000 (age 26) Amersfoort, Netherlands
- Height: 1.84 m (6 ft 0 in)
- Spouse: Ben Broeders (m. 2026)

Sport
- Sport: Track and field
- Events: 200 m, 400 m, 800 m, 400 m hurdles, 4 × 400 m relay
- Club: AV Altis
- Turned pro: 2019
- Coached by: Werner Andrea (2014–2016); Bram Peters (2016–2024, as assistant coach from 2019); Laurent Meuwly (since 2019); Emir Bekrić (since 2025 as assistant coach)

Achievements and titles
- Highest world ranking: No. 1 (400 mH, 2021); No. 2 (overall, 2023); No. 3 (400 m, 2023); No. 3 (800 m, 2026); No. 40 (200 m, 2024)
- Personal bests: Long track (Note: Best from outdoor 400-metre track (long track) only); 200 m: 22.80 (2024); 400 m: 49.44 (2022, NR); 800 m: 1:54.71 (2026, NR); 300 mH: 36.86 (2022, WB); 400 mH: 50.95 (2024, AR); Short track (Note: On 1 November 2023, World Athletics replaced the term 'indoor' with 'short track' for the indoor events that take place on 200-metre tracks.); 200 m: 22.64 i (2024, NR); 400 m: 49.17 i (2024, WR); 500 m: 1:05.63 i (2023, WB); 800 m: 1:59.07 i (2026, NR)
Medal record summary
Women's athletics
Representing Netherlands
Event	1st	2nd	3rd
Olympic Games	1	1	2
World Championships	3	3	1
World Indoor Championships	2	2	0
World Relays	0	1	0
Diamond League	5	0	0
European Championships	6	0	2
European Indoor Championships	6	0	0
European Games	1	0	0
European U20 Championships	1	0	0
Total	25	7	5
Event	1st	2nd	3rd
400 m	5	1	0
800 m	0	0	1
400 m hurdles	10	1	2
4 × 400 m relay	8	2	1
4 × 400 m mixed	2	3	1
Total	25	7	5
Medal record details
Women's athletics
Representing Netherlands
Olympic Games
Gold medal – first place	2024 Paris	4 × 400 m mixed
Silver medal – second place	2024 Paris	4 × 400 m relay
Bronze medal – third place	2020 Tokyo	400 m hurdles
Bronze medal – third place	2024 Paris	400 m hurdles
World Championships
Gold medal – first place	2023 Budapest	400 m hurdles
Gold medal – first place	2023 Budapest	4 × 400 m relay
Gold medal – first place	2025 Tokyo	400 m hurdles
Silver medal – second place	2022 Eugene	4 × 400 m mixed
Silver medal – second place	2022 Eugene	400 m hurdles
Silver medal – second place	2025 Tokyo	4 × 400 m mixed
Bronze medal – third place	2025 Tokyo	4 × 400 m relay
World Indoor Championships
Gold medal – first place	2024 Glasgow	400 m
Gold medal – first place	2024 Glasgow	4 × 400 m relay
Silver medal – second place	2022 Belgrade	400 m
Silver medal – second place	2022 Belgrade	4 × 400 m relay
World Relays
Silver medal – second place	2024 Nassau	4 × 400 m mixed
Diamond League
First place	2021 Zurich	400 m hurdles
First place	2022 Zurich	400 m hurdles
First place	2023 Eugene	400 m hurdles
First place	2024 Brussels	400 m hurdles
First place	2025 Zurich	400 m hurdles
European Championships
Gold medal – first place	2022 Munich	400 m
Gold medal – first place	2022 Munich	400 m hurdles
Gold medal – first place	2022 Munich	4 × 400 m relay
Gold medal – first place	2024 Rome	400 m hurdles
Gold medal – first place	2024 Rome	4 × 400 m relay
Gold medal – first place	2026 Birmingham	4 × 400 m relay
Bronze medal – third place	2024 Rome	4 × 400 m mixed
Bronze medal – third place	2026 Birmingham	800 m
European Indoor Championships
Gold medal – first place	2021 Toruń	400 m
Gold medal – first place	2021 Toruń	4 × 400 m relay
Gold medal – first place	2023 Istanbul	400 m
Gold medal – first place	2023 Istanbul	4 × 400 m relay
Gold medal – first place	2025 Apeldoorn	4 × 400 m mixed
Gold medal – first place	2025 Apeldoorn	4 × 400 m relay
European Games
Gold medal – first place	2023 Kraków-Małopolska	400 m
European U20 Championships
Gold medal – first place	2019 Borås	400 m hurdles

Femke Broeders-Bol (Note: On 21 February 2026, Femke Bol married Ben Broeders. Since then, she has been called by her married name Femke Broeders-Bol.) (pronounced [ˈfɛmkə] [ˈbrudərs] [bɔl]; née Bol; born 23 February 2000) is a Dutch track and field athlete who has competed in sprinting, middle-distance running, and hurdling. Up to 2025, she specialized in the 400 metres hurdles, where she is the 2023 and 2025 World Champion, and in the 400 metres, where she is the 2024 World Indoor Champion and the short track world record holder. Since 2026, she has been specializing in the 800 metres. In the 4 × 400 metres relay, she is the 2023 World Champion and the 2024 World Indoor Champion with the Dutch women's team and the 2024 Olympic Champion with the Dutch mixed team.

Broeders-Bol holds the world record in the 400 metres short track with a time of 49.17 seconds set on 2 March 2024; the European record in the 400 metres hurdles with a time of 50.95 seconds set on 14 July 2024, making her the second-fastest woman of all time in the event; the European record in the mixed 4 × 400 metres relay with a time of 3:07.43 minutes set on 3 August 2024; and seven Dutch records in individual events and relays. She also has world-best performances in the 300 metres hurdles and 500 metres short track, and previously had a world best performance in the mixed 4 × 400 metres relay short track.

She is a four-time medalist (one gold) at the Olympic Games, an eleven-time medalist (five gold) at the World Championships (outdoor and indoor), a silver medalist at the World Relays, five-time champion in the Diamond League, a fourteen-time medalist (twelve gold) at the European Championships (outdoor and indoor), a gold medalist at the European Games, and an eleven-time medalist (five gold) at the Dutch Championships (outdoor and indoor).

Broeders-Bol's highest World Athletics Rankings were No. 1 in the 400 metres hurdles in 2021–2026, No. 3 in the 400 metres in 2023 and 2024, No. 3 in the 800 metres in 2026, and No. 2 of women overall in 2023, 2024, and 2026. She was European Athletics Rising Star of the Year in 2021 and European Athlete of the Year in 2022, 2023 and 2025.

== Early life and background ==
Femke Bol was born on 23 February 2000 in Amersfoort, Netherlands. She has an older brother. As a child, Bol practised judo for a year after she had broken her arm twice and her doctor had recommended the sport to help her learn how to fall.

Around 2008, she started practising athletics at a local club, following her brother who was already a member there. In an interview, Bol said about the sport: "It was always a way to clear your mind and just have fun and not think too much about other things. That's still what I like so much about it." In 2014, she transferred to another local club, AV Altis, where her coach discovered her talent for longer sprints. She worked as a volunteer scanning tickets during the 2016 European Championships in Amsterdam.

Bol attended secondary school in Amersfoort, after which she became a student of communication sciences at Wageningen University. As of 2023, she was in a relationship with Belgian pole vaulter Ben Broeders. In 2024, the couple bought a house in Heelsum, Netherlands. In 2025, the couple got engaged. On 21 February 2026, the couple got married in Amersfoort.

During the 2023 European Indoor Championships in Istanbul, Turkey, she called on people to donate money for humanitarian aid to the victims of the 2023 Turkey–Syria earthquakes a month earlier. Since 2025, she has been an ambassador for Free a Girl, a non-profit organisation that is committed to rescuing girls from situations of sexual exploitation. Bol wrote a Dutch children's book Team TOFF gaat er voor! (2025) inspired by her own childhood and the proceeds will be donated to Free a Girl.

In October 2025, she opened the Femke Bol Hal, an indoor sports facility in Amersfoort named after her. In March 2026, a wax figure in her likeness was unveiled in Madame Tussauds Amsterdam.

== Youth and junior career ==
Bol focused on the 400 metres distance in 2015, at age 15, and started winning Dutch age-group competitions. She won five national youth titles in the 400 m (outdoor and indoor) between 2015 and 2017, and four junior titles in 2018 and 2019 (400 m outdoor, indoor, and hurdles). In 2016, she started training with coach Bram Peters at the athletics track of Ciko'66 in Arnhem, where her parents drove her almost daily.

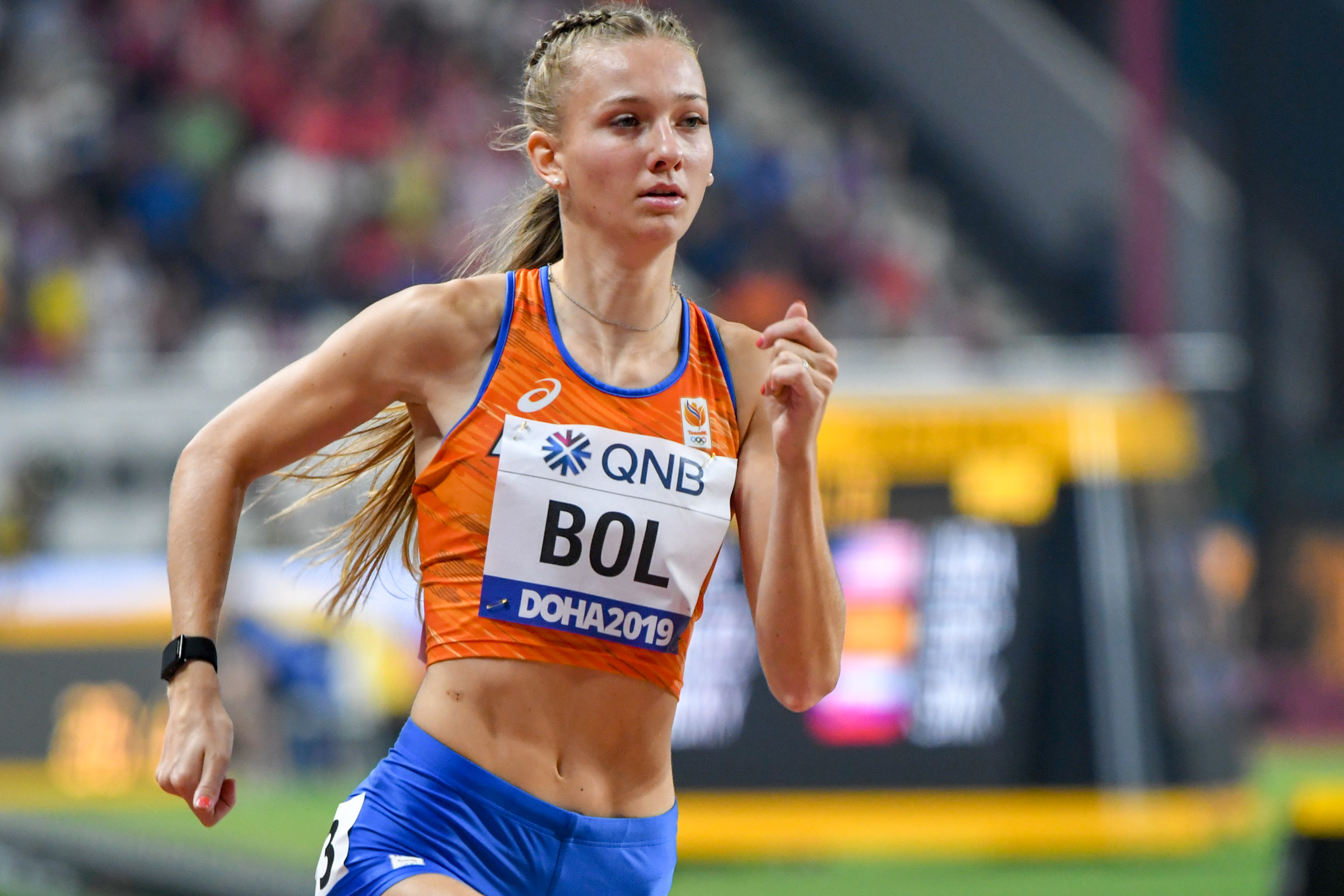
19-year-old Bol during the 400 m hurdles at the 2019 World Championships in Doha

At the international competitions, she progressed steadily. Competing against athletes up to two years her senior, Bol did not advance from the 400 m heats at the 2015 European Youth Olympic Festival in Tbilisi, Georgia. Two years later, the 17-year-old participated in the European Under-20 Championships held in Grosseto, Italy and reached the semi-finals of the event.

In 2019, her last year as a junior competitor, she claimed her first national title (indoor 400 m) in a senior competition. In June, in the third hurdles race of her life, Bol broke Dutch U20/U23 records and achieved World Championship qualifying standard when winning a meet in Geneva with a time of 55.94 s. In July, she won a gold medal in the 400 m hurdles at the European U20 Championships in Borås, Sweden. In September, she ran her first professional race at the Galà dei Castelli in Bellinzona, Switzerland. In October, at the Doha World Championships in Qatar, the 19-year-old reached the semi-finals with a new personal best of 55.32 s in the heats of the 400 m hurdles, becoming the second-fastest European U20 woman in history. She also helped her national women's team place seventh in the 4 × 400 m relay.

Since November 2019, she has been training at the Dutch National Sports Centre Papendal near Arnhem, coached by Switzerland's Laurent Meuwly and her previous coach Bram Peters as assistant coach.

== Senior career ==
=== 2020: First senior Dutch record and first senior successes ===
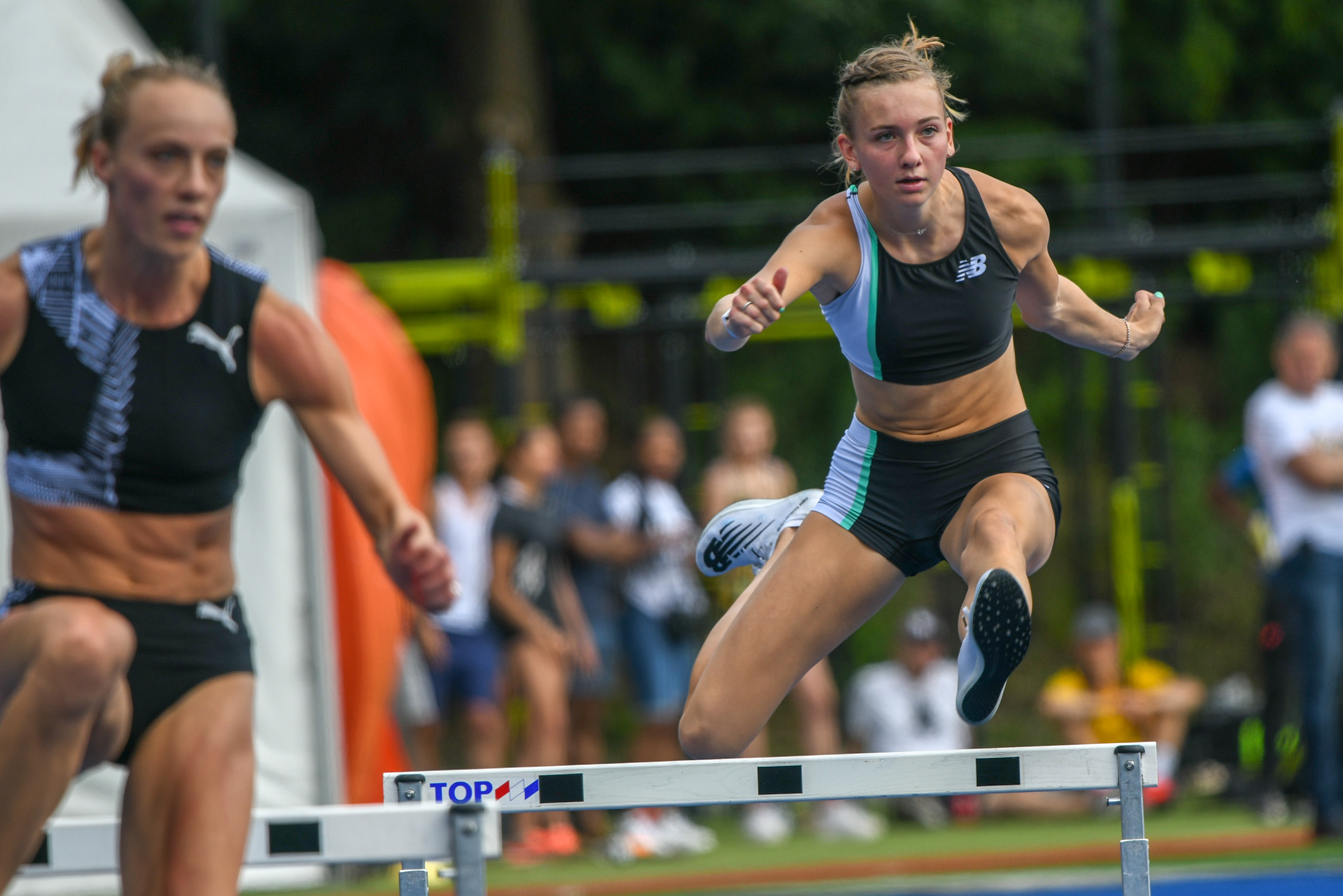
Bol (right) set her first senior Dutch record at the National Sports Centre in 2020.

Bol was forced to train on gravel paths in the woods and on grass fields when COVID-19 quarantine measures were first enacted in March 2020. Despite this, she raced in Papendal in July and broke by almost a second the national 400 m hurdles record of 54.62 s set by Ester Goossens in 1998. First, running in the rain, she took almost a second off her 2019 best with a time of 54.47 s, which could not be ratified as only one other athlete competed. Two weeks later, she achieved 53.79 s, the fourth-fastest European under-23 time in history.

During this pandemic season, the Dutchwoman won all her following races over the barriers: two Diamond League events staged in 2020 as one-off exhibition competitions, and three Continental Tour events. First she stayed ahead of all her competitors in Székesfehérvár, Hungary on 19 August, to repeat this achievement four days later at the Stockholm Bauhaus-galan winning her first Diamond race. In September, she won in Ostrava (300 m hurdles), Bellinzona, and Rome. She reduced her open 400 metres pre-2020 best by 1.85 s down to 51.13 s.

=== 2021: Tokyo Olympic bronze medalist ===
Bol started her unbeaten indoor campaign on 30 January, beating her previous best in the 400 metres by more than 1.5 s to break a Dutch record in a time of 50.96 s at the Vienna Indoor Track & Field meet in Austria. The previous record was set a few minutes earlier by Lieke Klaver, who in turn broke Ester Goossens' mark which had stood at 51.82 s since 1998. Bol then won all her following seven races at the distance in four events, improving in every final. Competing in the World Indoor Tour, she powered to meet records in Metz (50.81 s) and Toruń (50.66 s), then clocked 50.64 s at the Dutch Indoor Championships, and finally lowered her record to 50.63 s when winning at the European Indoor Championships in Toruń, Poland. There she took her second gold medal anchoring the women's 4 × 400 m relay to a championship record. Her individual mark made her the fastest European woman since 2009.

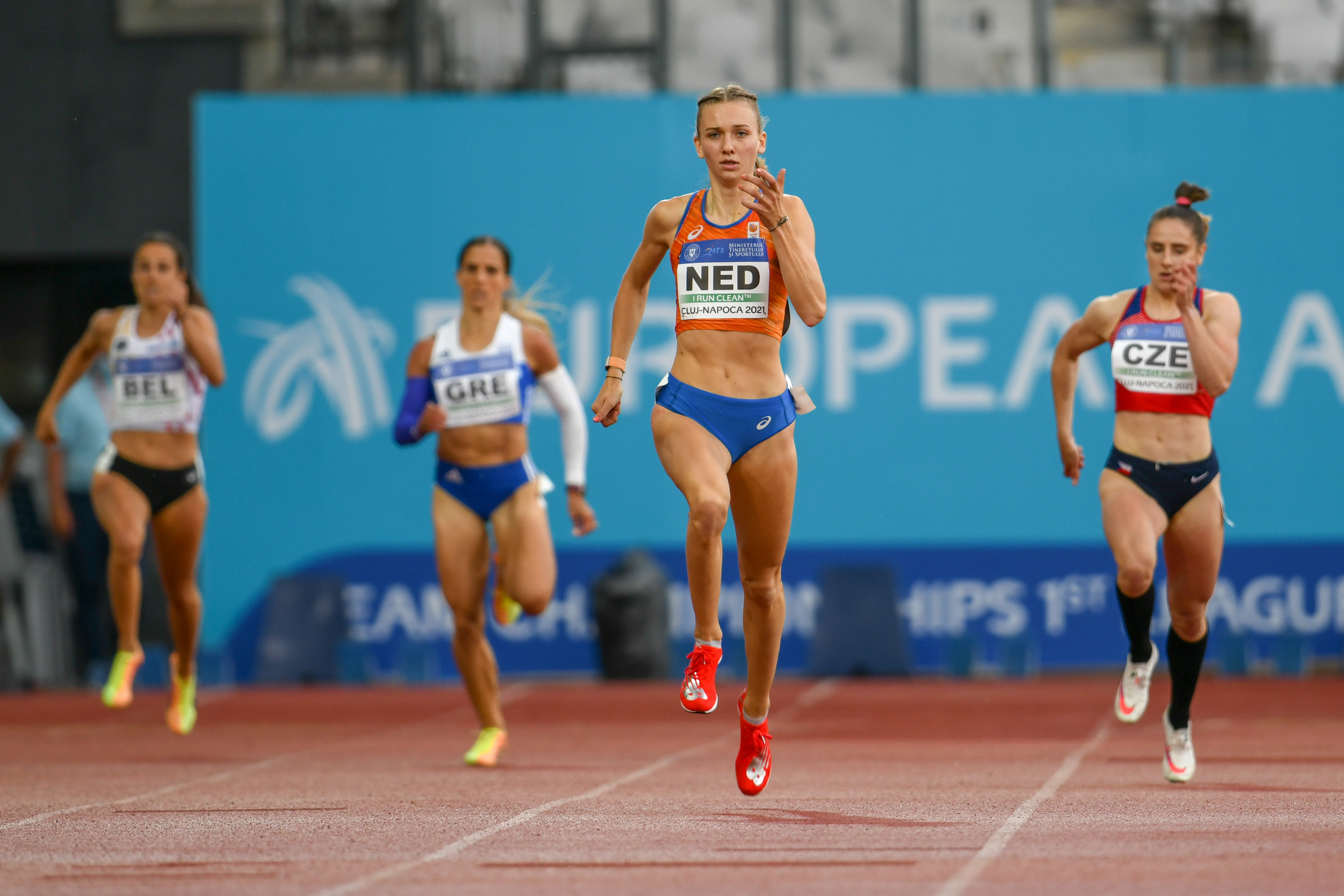
Bol (center) during the 400 metres at the 2021 European Team Championships, where she won and set one of her eleven Dutch records from 2021.

The 21-year-old started her 2021 outdoor season by competing at the World Relays, before setting a 400 m national record of 50.56 s at the IFAM Meeting on 29 May in Oordegem. She then started improving her own Dutch hurdling record when winning Diamond League meetings, beginning with a time of 53.44 s on 10 June in Florence. At the time it was also European U23 record, breaking a 37-year-old mark. On 19 June, she returned to the 400 m flat event during the European Team Championships in Romania and bettered her record with a 50.37 s performance. On 1 July in Oslo, she lowered her hurdles record in a time of 53.33 s. She then took almost a second off with a Diamond League record of 52.37 s on 4 July in Stockholm, where she beat Shamier Little by 0.02 s. This race was only the second in history, after the 2017 USATF Championships, in which three women recorded times below 53 seconds as third-placed Anna Ryzhykova finished in 52.96 s. Bol, meanwhile, became the fourth fastest woman of all time with the sixth-fastest result ever, missing the European record by just 0.03 s. On 6 July, she won the event at the Continental Tour meet in Székesfehérvár with a time of 52.81 s, edging out Little in 52.85 s again. Having won the Diamond League race in Gateshead, England on 13 July, she extended her unbeaten streak in her specialist event to 12 races in total. It was her third consecutive victory over Little.

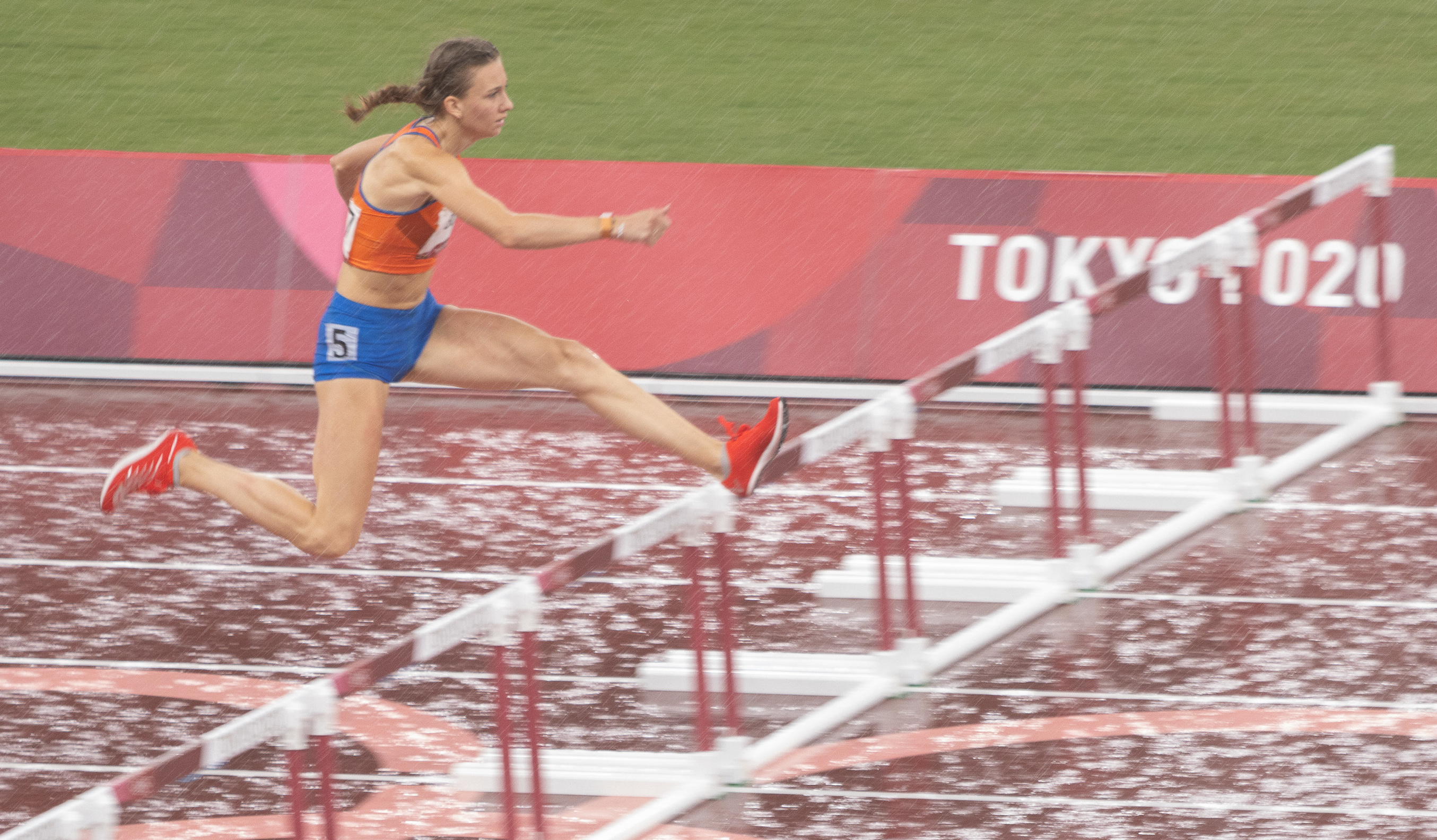
Bol hurdling in the semi-final at the 2020 Tokyo Olympic Games during heavy rain

At the delayed 2020 Tokyo Olympics in July and August 2021, Bol ran six 400 m races with hurdles and flat, including three under 50 seconds relay legs. In the 400 m hurdles final, Bol finished third after Sydney McLaughlin (51.46 s – world record) and Dalilah Muhammad (51.58 s – inside previous world record). With her time of 52.03 s, she broke the European record and became the third-fastest woman of all time at the event with the fourth-fastest result ever. It was the first ever Olympic medal for the Netherlands at the event. Before Bol's individual final on 4 August, she helped the mixed 4 × 400 m relay team set a national record in the final with her 49.74 s split, and later she anchored the women's 4 × 400 m relay to consecutive Dutch records in the heat and in the final, clocking splits of 49.14 s and 48.97 s respectively. On 8 August, she reached a 400 metres hurdles ranking of No. 1 in the World Athletics Rankings for the first time.

After the Games, in August and September, she continued her Diamond League dominance over the barriers, winning in Lausanne and the Zurich final with meet records of 53.05 s and 52.80 s respectively to claim her first Diamond trophy. At the former, she finished clear ahead of Shamier Little and Dalilah Muhammad, while in Zurich Bol held off Little again. Having skipped the USA's event in Eugene and ran 400 m flat in Paris (50.59 s, 4th), she remained unbeaten in the Diamond race with six wins out of six races. While still in Switzerland, on 14 September, she ended her breakthrough season with another meet record of 54.01 s in Bellinzona, staying unbeaten in 11 of her 12 hurdles races in 2021.

In 2021, Bol gradually improved her personal bests, setting eleven national records with five more as a member of relay teams. Bol also set a Diamond League record, three Diamond League circuit's meet records, and five meet records at the World Athletics Indoor Tour and Continental Tour events. She went under 53 seconds in the 400 m hurdles four times that season, had an individual win-loss record of 16–4, and was voted European Athletics Rising Star of the Year.

=== 2022: World indoor and outdoor silver medalist and triple European champion ===
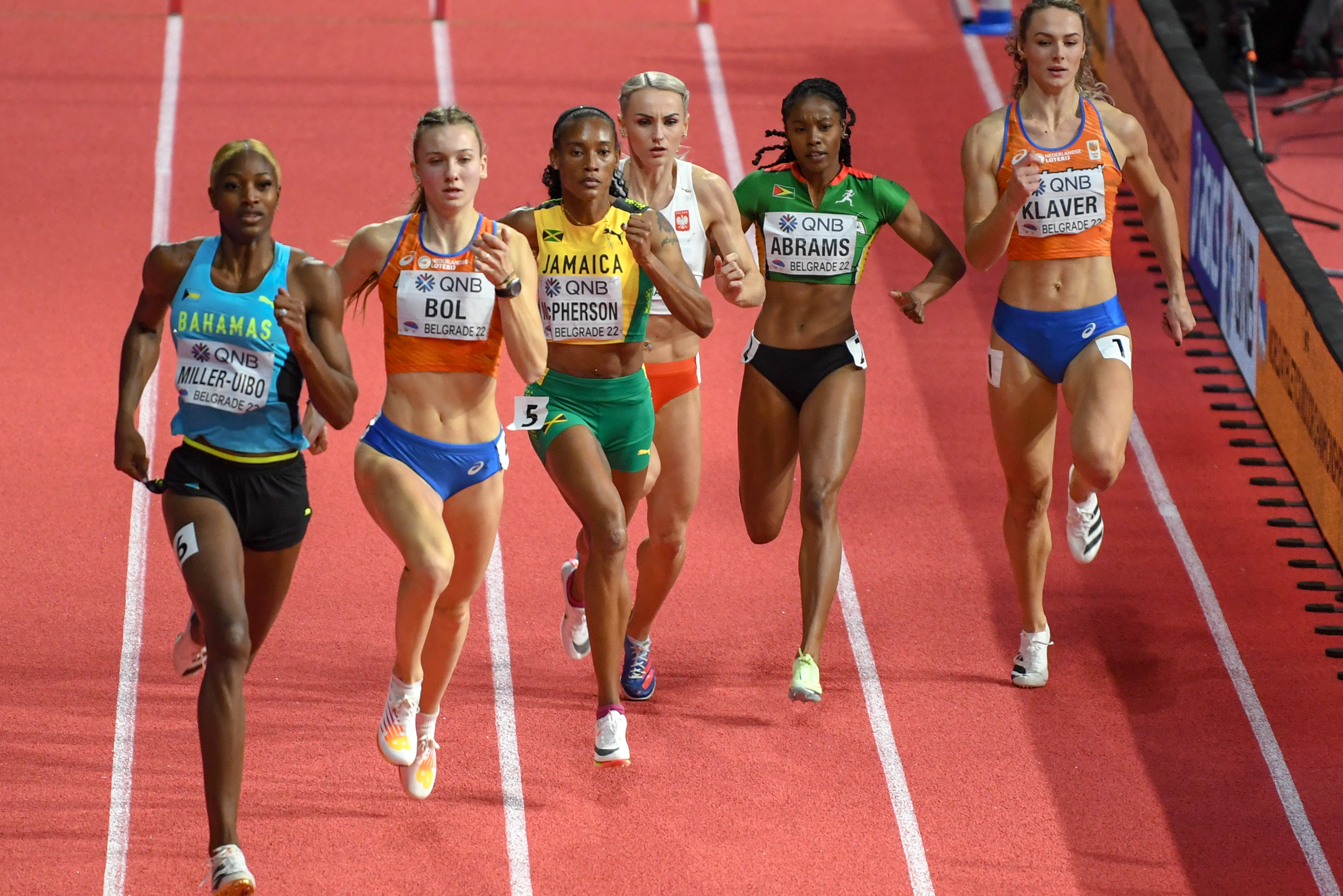
Bol (second from the left) at the 2022 World Indoors in Belgrade, where she finished second in the 400 m.

Bol opened her indoor season returning to Metz, France, where she bested her previous meeting record in the 400 m (50.72 s), and also won her 200 metres heat with a new personal best (23.37 s). Then she returned to Toruń, Poland, to beat her local meet record again (50.64 s). On 27 February, at the Dutch Indoor Championships, she improved her own national record with a 50.30 s clocking which was also faster than her outdoor best, and putting her 12th on the world indoor all-time list. At the World Indoor Championships in Belgrade about three weeks later, Bol won the silver medal, after she fell at the finish line during the semi-finals, in a time of 50.57 s behind Miller-Uibo who ran 50.31 s. Bol also anchored the Dutch women's 4 × 400 m relay to silver thanks to her closing surge from fourth into second, with the fastest split of the race of 50.26 s.

The 22-year-old started her outdoor season on 31 May at the Golden Spike meeting in Ostrava, where she ran a world best over the 300 m hurdles. She clocked a time of 36.86 s, which was 1.3 s faster than the previous best set by Zuzana Hejnová in 2013. She continued with Diamond League wins in Rome, Oslo, and Stockholm, breaking a meet record in Oslo before posting 52.27 s in Stockholm to improve her own Diamond League record with 0.10 s which she set the previous year.

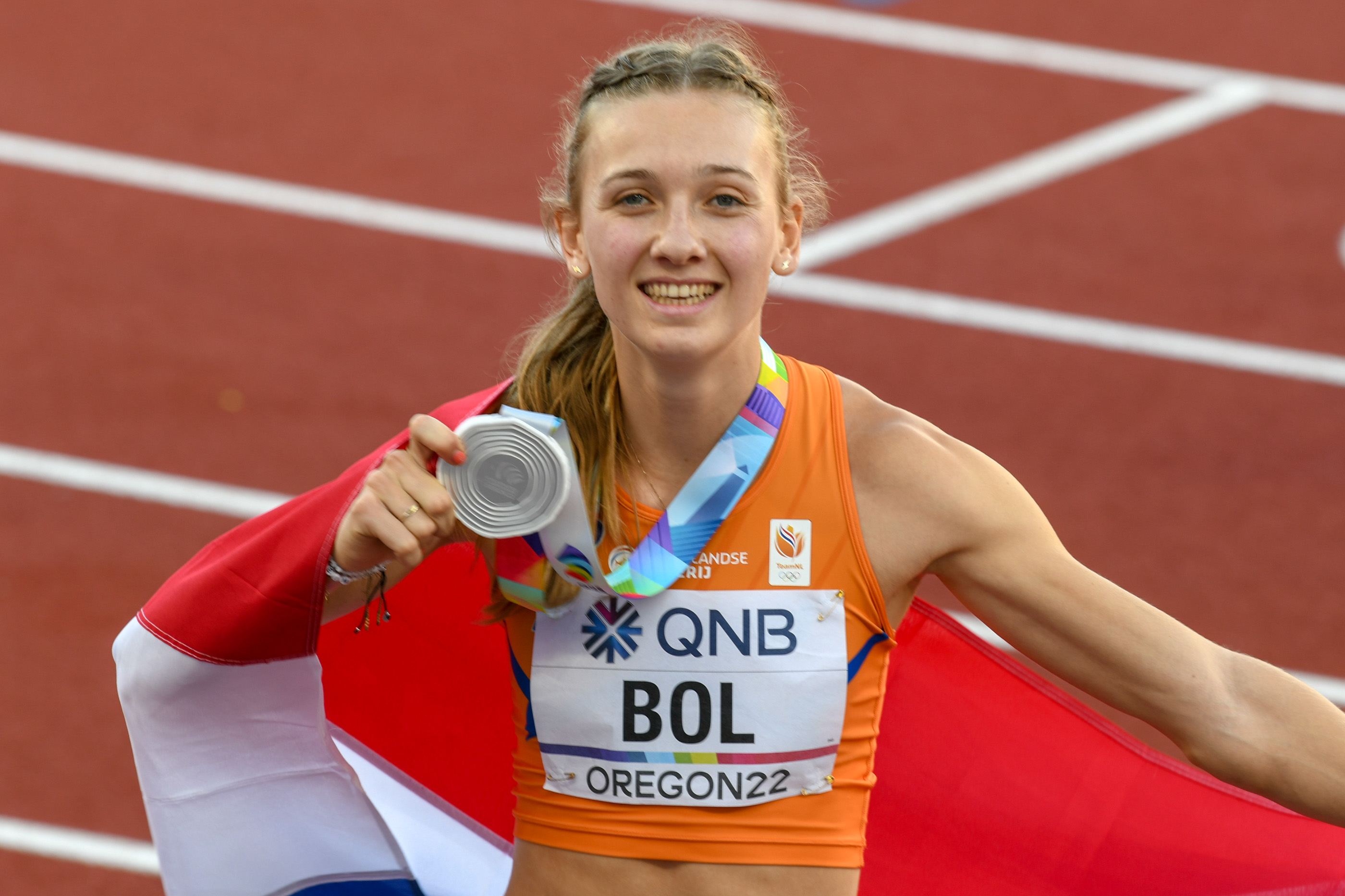
After her Olympic bronze in 2021, Bol went one better in the 400 m hurdles at the 2022 World Championships in Eugene.

At the World Championships in Eugene, Oregon in July, Bol first ran the final leg of the mixed 4 × 400 m relay. After taking the baton a distant third, she anchored the Dutch team to a silver and a national record thanks to her split of 48.95 s, the second-fastest female split of the entire race. In the 400 m hurdles, she equalled her season's best (52.27 s) to finish behind McLaughlin (who lowered her world record to 50.68 s) and ahead of Muhammad in third (53.13 s). The Dutch women's 4 × 400 m squad lost the baton in the heats and was disqualified despite a qualifying position. After the championships in August, she went for the first time under 50 seconds in the 400 m flat and set a national and meet record with a time of 49.75 s at the Silesia Diamond League.

The same month, she completed a hat-trick of gold medals at the European Championships in Munich, becoming the first female sprinter to complete a 400 m double at a major championships as she won one-lap events both with and without hurdles. Her time for the open 400 m of 49.44 s was the fastest at a Europeans since Stuttgart 1986 and a new national record, while over the barriers Bol set a championship record. She rounded off her Munich campaign by producing a 48.52 s anchor leg to land the Netherlands gold and a national record in the 4 × 400 m relay, moving from third to first around the final bend; their result was also the fastest at a Europeans since 1986. Bol became only the second Dutch athlete after Fanny Blankers-Koen in 1950 to win three gold medals at the event.

In her return to the Diamond League, Bol set another meet record over the barriers in Lausanne, and then concluded her third senior season with a victory at the Zurich final, successfully defending her Diamond League title. She achieved six marks under 53 seconds that year, staying unbeaten in 11 out of her 12 hurdles races, posted an individual win-loss record of 13–4, and was crowned European Female Athlete of the Year.

=== 2023: World indoor 400 m record and double world champion ===
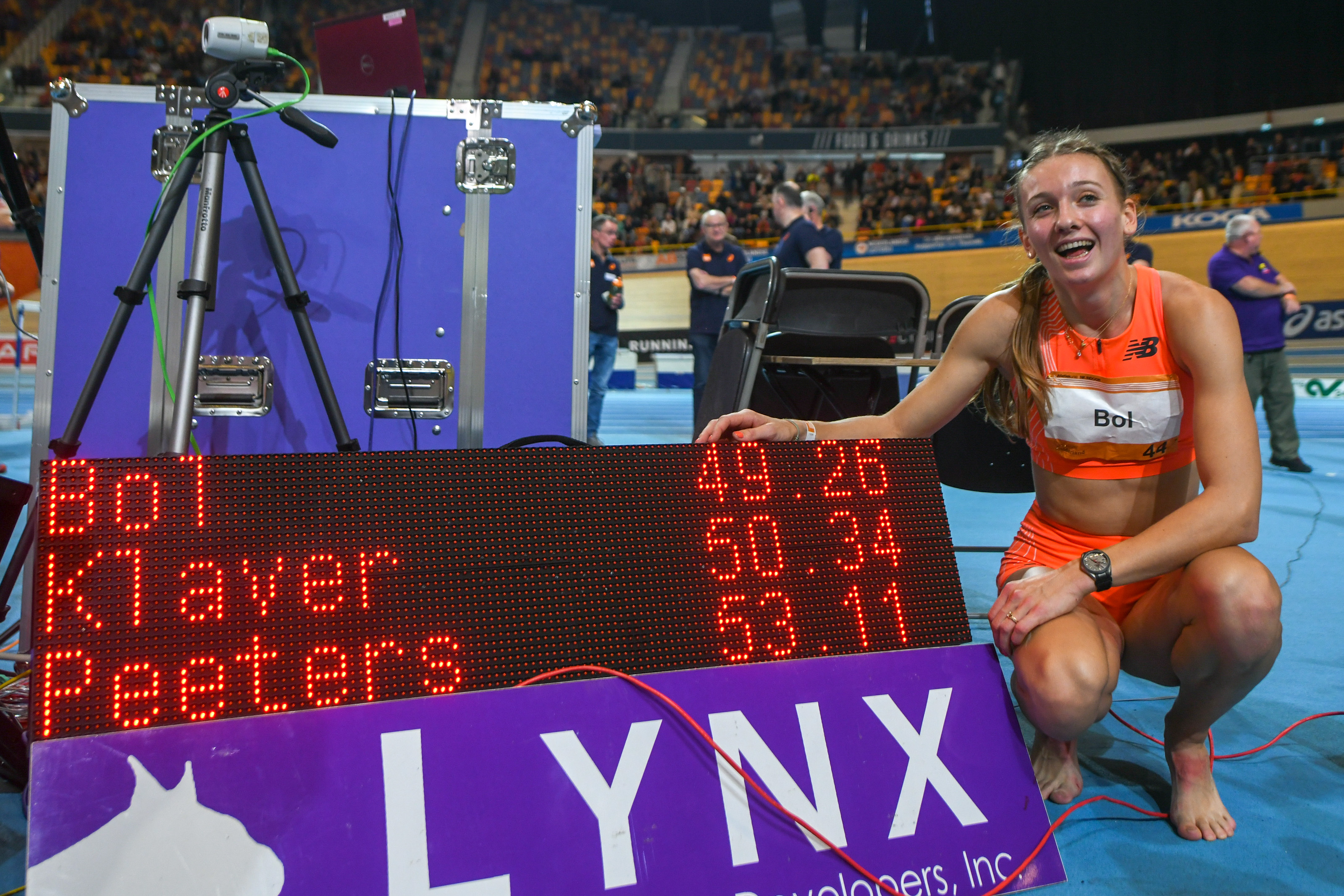
On 19 February 2023, Bol set a world indoor 400 m record, breaking the longest-standing track world record.

On 4 February, Bol improved by nearly 0.7 s the indoor world best performance in the less frequently run distance of 500 metres with 1:05.63 min, also faster than the outdoor record (1:05.9 min), at the New Balance Indoor Grand Prix in Boston, USA. Competing again in Metz, France, she set new Dutch indoor records in both the 200 m and 400 m. Bol clocked a lifetime best in the former (22.87 s), and was the fourth woman in history to go under 50 seconds with 49.96 s in the latter. She next triumphed with a meet record in Liévin (50.20 s).

On 19 February at the Dutch Indoor Championships in Apeldoorn, she sliced 0.7 s off her best with a landmark 49.26 s, breaking the longest-standing world record in a track race. This was at the time the 49.59 s indoor 400 m record, set by Jarmila Kratochvílová back in 1982. After setting an outright lifetime best, Bol said, "this was almost a perfect race".

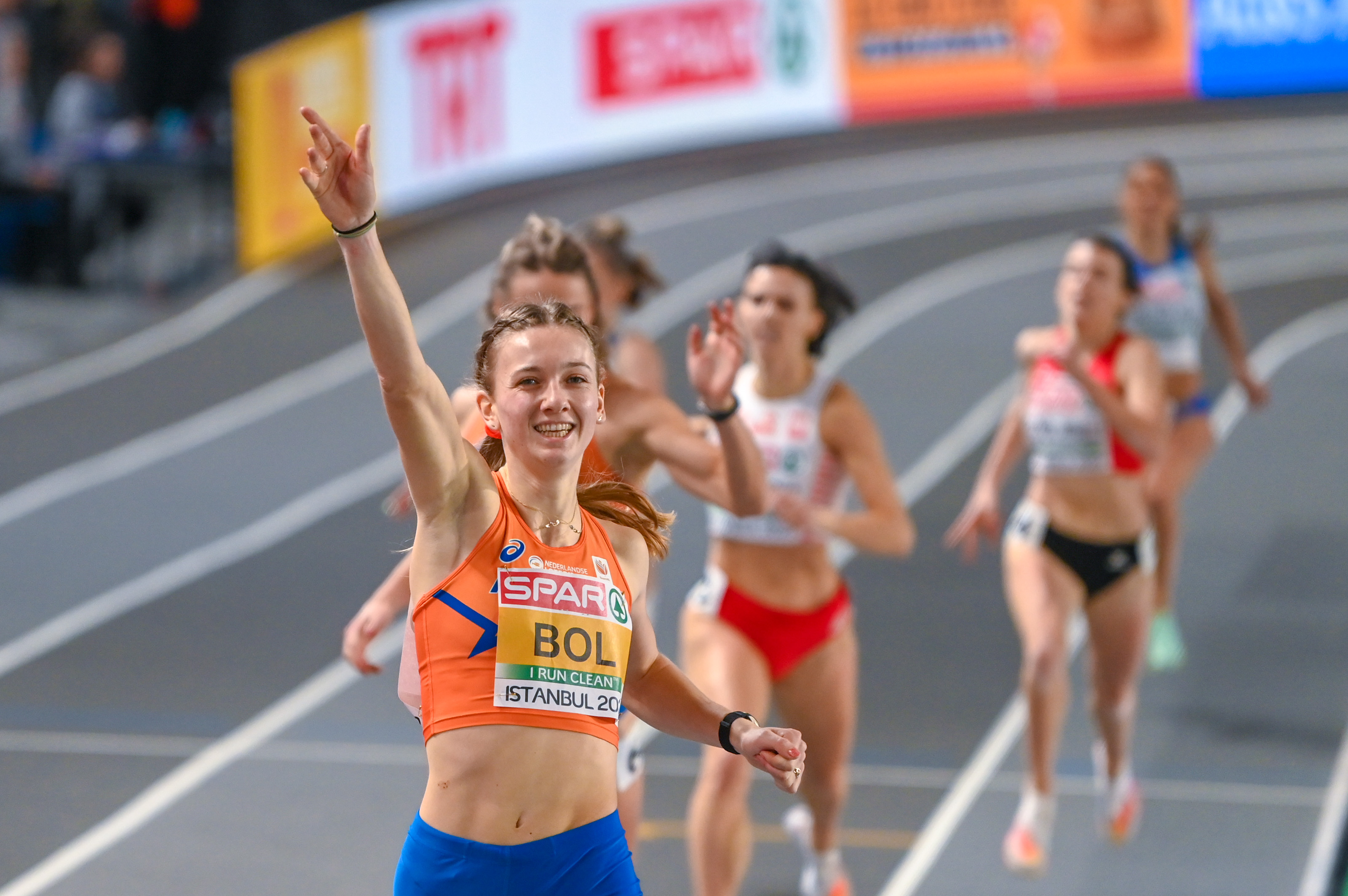
Bol ended her 2023 indoor season with a 400 m race in 49.85 s at the 2023 European Indoor Championships. She went under 50 seconds a record three times that year.

She capped her record-breaking indoor campaign by successfully defending her European 400 m title at Istanbul 2023 with the third mark under 50 seconds in the that season (49.85 s), a global record. She added her seventh European title anchoring the Netherlands to a 4 × 400 m relay victory with a new Dutch and championship record, making them the third-fastest national women's team in history.

Training for the 2023 outdoor season, Bol practiced a different stride pattern for the 400 m hurdles in an effort to become faster. Previously, she took fifteen steps between the hurdles throughout the race, which meant she could jump over each hurdle with the same leg leading. Now, she tried out fourteen steps between the first few hurdles, which made her alternate between her legs for the jump, only to change it to fifteen steps for the last hurdles. Bol tried this new setup in competition for the first time in Oordegem, Belgium on 27 May, where she ran sixteen steps after hurdle seven instead of fifteen and nonetheless set a world lead of 53.12 s. Bol continued to win three Diamond League races over hurdles in Rome, Oslo, and Lausanne, setting meet records in all three of them.

On 23 July, Bol made her first ever appearance at the London Diamond League. After leading from the first barrier, Bol continued to widen her lead throughout the entire race. At the finish line, she stopped the clock at a time of 51.45 s, which was a 0.58 s improvement of her personal best in the 400 hurdles. With her performance in London, Bol became the third woman in history to run the 400 metres hurdles under 52 seconds. Her time of 51.45 s was the third-fastest time ever and made her the second-fastest woman of all time, as only world record holder McLaughlin-Levrone had run faster. This time also further lowered her own European and Diamond League records. On 25 July, she reached a women's overall ranking of No. 2 in the World Athletics Rankings for the first time, with only Faith Kipyegon ranking higher.

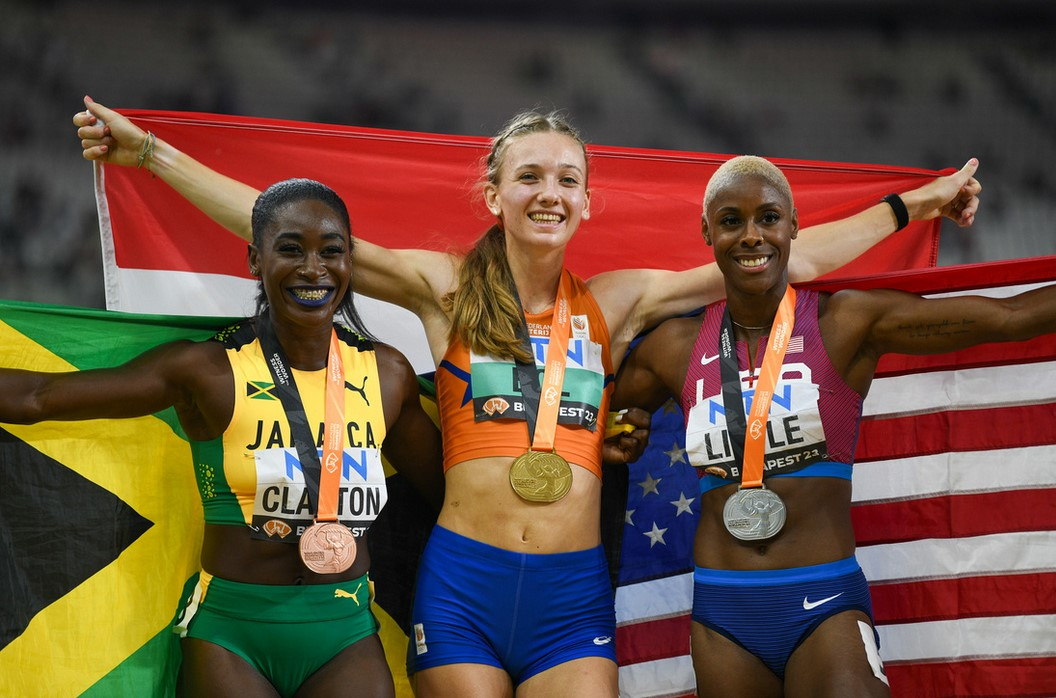
Bol with her gold 400 m hurdles medal, together with silver medalist Shamier Little (right) and bronze medalist Rushell Clayton (left), at the 2023 World Championships

Bol competed in three events at the 2023 World Athletics Championships in Budapest, Hungary. On 19 August, during the 4 × 400 m mixed relay, Bol fell within metres of the finish line, while vying with Alexis Holmes of the USA for first place. Landing face first, Bol lost the relay baton over the finish line, making it impossible for the Netherlands team to legitimately finish the race and resulting in a DNF. On 24 August, she gained her first world title when she won the final of the 400 m hurdles in 51.70 s. Mike Rowbottom of World Athletics called Bol's performance in the mixed relay and hurdles "the fall and rise of Femke Bol". She then continued her success on 27 August with her anchor leg in the women's 4 × 400 metres relay, passing Nicole Yeargin of Great Britain and Stacey-Ann Williams of Jamaica shortly before the finish line, earning her a second gold medal at these World Championships, together with team members Eveline Saalberg, Lieke Klaver, Cathelijn Peeters, and Lisanne de Witte (heat only).

After the World Championships, Bol won her 400 metres hurdles races at the Galà dei Castelli in Bellinzona, Memorial Van Damme in Brussels, and Prefontaine Classic in Eugene, setting meeting records on all three occasions and becoming the 2023 Diamond League champion in 51.98 s, her third time under 52 seconds of the season, on 17 September. In 2023, Bol won all of her twenty individual 400 m flat and hurdles races and became European Athlete of the Year for a second time.

=== 2024: Two world records, double world indoor champion, and triple Olympic medalist ===
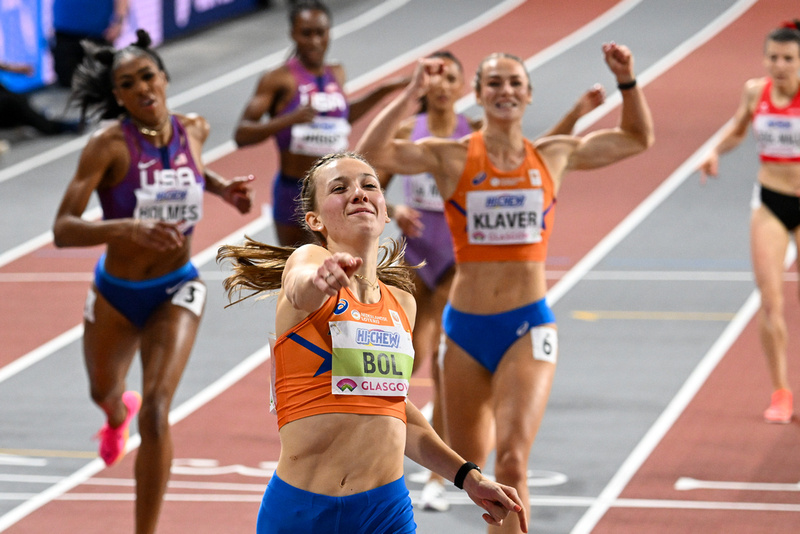
Bol (front) shortly after finishing the 400 m short track in a world record time of 49.17 s in Glasgow

On 3 February, Bol started her 2024 indoor season in Metz, where she won the 400 metres short track with a meeting record of 49.69 s. Here she also finished first in the 200 metres short track in 22.64 s, setting both a Dutch indoor record and a meeting record. On 10 February, she won the 400 metres short track in Liévin in 49.63 s, another meeting record and the 4th-best result of all time. At the Dutch Indoor Championships in Apeldoorn on 18 February, she improved her own world record in the 400 metres short track with 0.02 s to 49.24 s, after running 50.55 s in the heats a day earlier.

At the World Indoor Championships in Glasgow, Bol competed in the 400 m short track, where she won her heat in 52.00 s and her semi-final in 50.66 s. In the final, she won the gold medal in 49.17 s, improving her world record for a second time this year. In an interview after the final race, Bol had a high-pitched voice because of body exertion, which was compared online to the voice of Mickey Mouse. She then anchored the Dutch women's relay team in the 4 × 400 m short track relay heats (3:27.70 min) and final, where she finished first in 3:25.07 min, setting a Dutch record and winning her second gold medal of these championships, together with Lieke Klaver, Cathelijn Peeters, Eveline Saalberg (heat only), Myrte van der Schoot (heat only), and Lisanne de Witte.

On 28 April, Bol opened her outdoor season in Willemstad, Curaçao, where she competed in two distances at the Curaçao SprintFest. She ran the 100 metres in 11.47 s finishing in fifth place and the 150 metres in 17.10 s finishing third, which were both personal bests. On 4–5 May, she competed in the World Relays in Nassau, Bahamas. Bol ran the anchor leg in the heat of the mixed 4 × 400 m relay with Isayah Boers, Klaver, and Isaya Klein Ikkink, finishing in a championship record of 3:12.16 min and qualifying the Dutch mixed relay team for the 2024 Paris Olympics. In the final, she anchored the mixed team to a silver medal in 3:11.45 min, where the United States won in 3:10.73 min. On 2 June, Bol ran her first 400 m hurdles race of the season at the Bauhaus-galan in Stockholm, Sweden, which she won in 53.07 s.

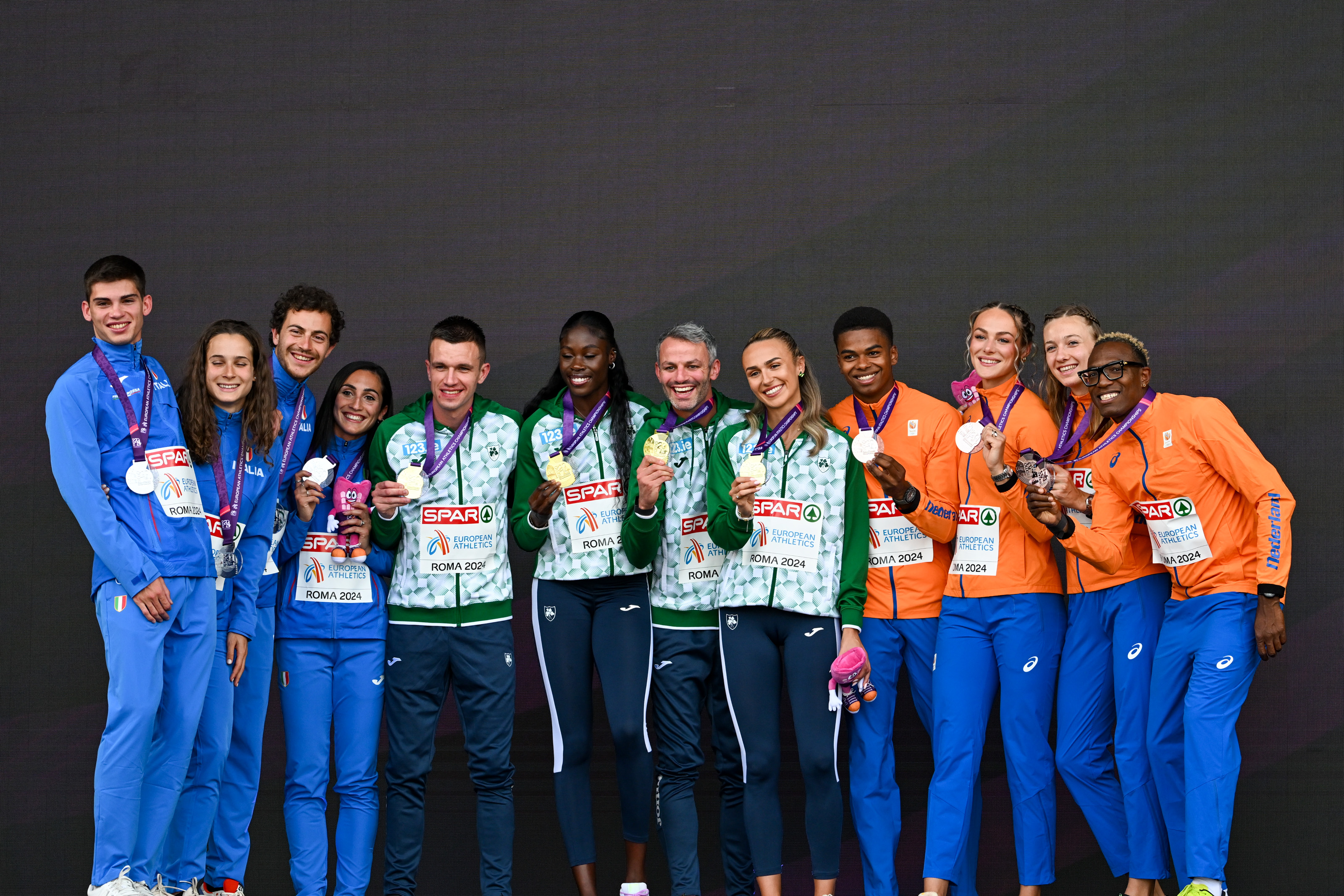
The medalling mixed 4 × 400 m relay teams, with Bol second from the right, at the 2024 European Championships in Rome

Bol competed in three events at the European Championships in Rome, Italy. On 7 June, she won a bronze medal in the mixed 4 × 400 m relay, when she anchored the Dutch team with Liemarvin Bonevacia, Klaver, and Klein Ikkink finishing in 3:10.73 min after the Irish and Italian teams. Bol had a split time of 49.21 s, which made her the fastest female competitor in this mixed relay final. On 11 June, she successfully defended her European title in the 400 m hurdles, winning in a championship record of 52.49 s, after running 54.16 s in the semifinals a day earlier. She received a Golden Crown for her final hurdles performance of 1253 points, because this was the highest World Athletics score in the women's sprints and hurdles category at the championships. On 12 June, Bol anchored the Dutch women's 4 × 400 m relay team with Klaver, Peeters, and De Witte with a split time of 50.45 s to the first place in 3:22.39 min, winning her second gold and third medal of the championships.

On 29 and 30 June, Bol competed in the 200 m at the Dutch Championships in Hengelo, where she ran 23.14 s in her semi-final and an outdoor personal best of 22.80 s in the final, finishing in third place after Tasa Jiya and Klaver. On 7 July, she won the 400 m in a meeting record of 50.02 s at the FBK Games also in Hengelo.

On 14 July, Bol competed in the 400 m hurdles at Résisprint International in La Chaux-de-Fonds in Switzerland. She finished in 50.95 s, breaking her own European record from 2023 and going under 51 seconds for the first time. It was the third-fastest time in history, only Sydney McLaughlin-Levrone was faster when she ran her 2022 and 2024 world records. Bol donated her bodysuit from the race to the Museum of World Athletics the following year. On 20 July, she won the 400 m hurdles race in 51.30 s at the 2024 London Athletics Meet, breaking her own meeting record and Diamond League record.

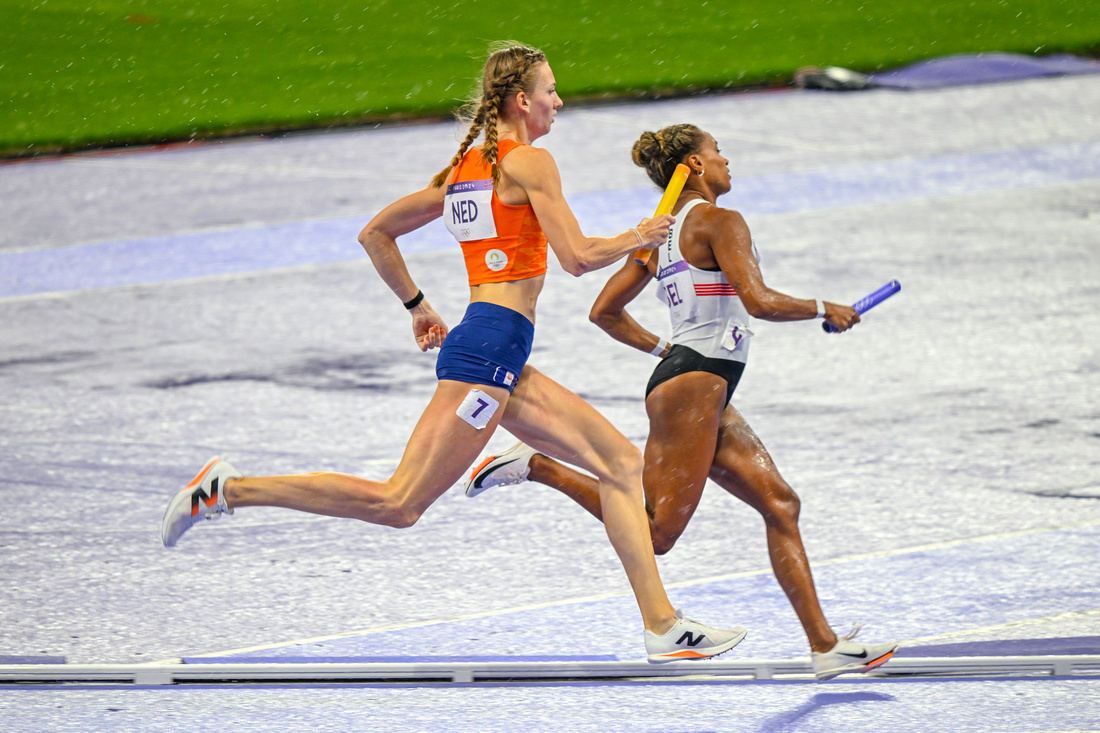
Femke Bol (left) passing Naomi Van den Broeck in the final of the mixed 4 × 400 metres relay at the 2024 Paris Olympics.

At the Paris Olympics, Bol competed and medalled in three events. On 3 August, she anchored the Dutch team with Eugene Omalla, Klaver, and Klein Ikkink in the mixed 4 × 400 metres relay to win gold in a European record of 3:07.43 min. The time was 0.02 s off the world record set by the team of the United States in the first round a day earlier. Bol passed Naomi Van den Broeck of Belgium (fourth place), Amber Anning of Great Britain (bronze medal), and Kaylyn Brown of the United States (silver medal) and had a split time of 48.00 s, making her the fastest female runner of the race. In the 400 metres hurdles, she ran 53.38 s in the first round on 4 August and 52.57 s in the semi-finals on 6 August. On 8 August, she won a bronze medal in 52.15 s in the 400 m hurdles final, finishing after McLaughlin-Levrone in a world record of 50.37 s and Anna Cockrell in a personal best of 51.87 s. On 10 August, Bol anchored the Dutch women's team with Klaver, Peeters, and De Witte in the 4 × 400 m relay to a silver medal in a national record of 3:19.50 min, 4.23 s after the team of the United States in gold position and 0.22 s before the bronze team of Great Britain. On 11 August, triple medalists Bol and Harrie Lavreysen (track cycling) were the flag bearers for the Netherlands at the Olympic closing ceremony. On 13 August, Bol became a knight of the Order of Orange-Nassau as an Olympic gold medalist.

Bol won her next two 400 m hurdles races in the Diamond League, ensuring qualification for the season final in Brussels: on 22 August, she set a meeting record of 52.25 s at the Athletissima in Lausanne, Switzerland, and on 25 August, she set another meeting record of 52.13 s at the Kamila Skolimowska Memorial in Chorzów, Poland. On 14 September, she won the Diamond League final in Brussels in 52.45 s, finishing more than a second before the rest of the field, which brought Bol the fourth Diamond League trophy of her career.

=== 2025: World champion and double European indoor champion ===
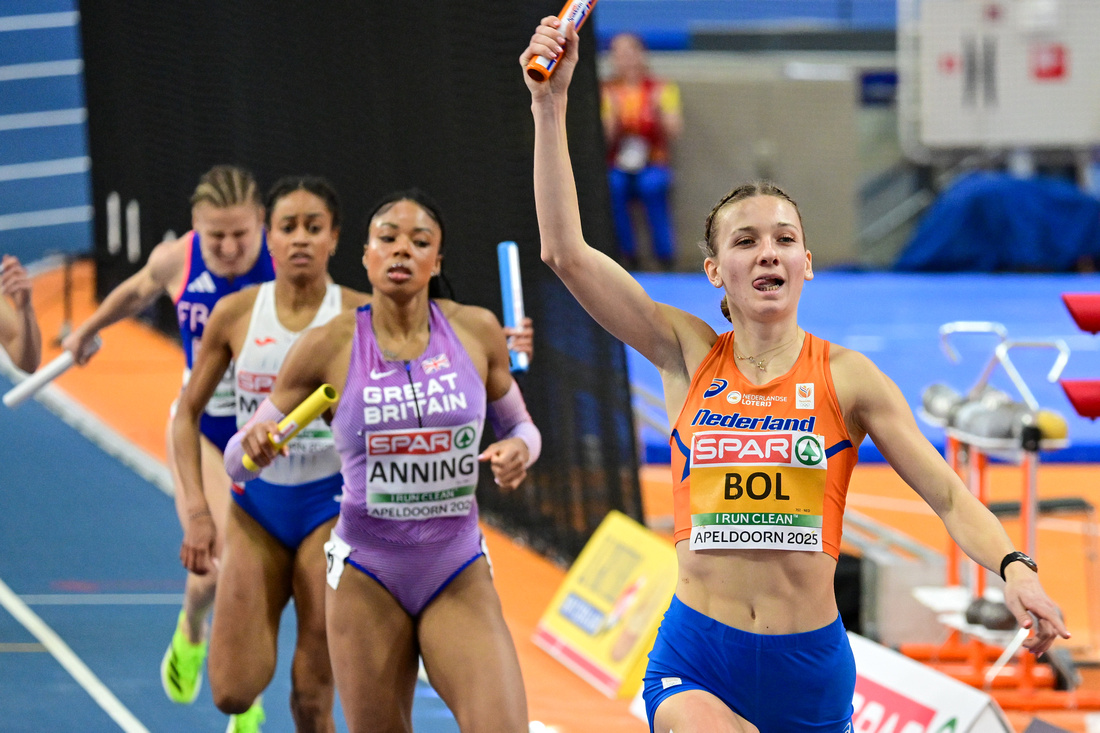
Bol (right) winning gold with the Dutch women's team in the 4 × 400 m relay at the 2025 European Indoor Championships

In January, Bol announced that she was not going to compete in individual events during the 2025 indoor season, but only in relays. She explained her decision on social media: "It gives me the opportunity to have some more time processing everything that has happened and prioritize more things outside of the sports that are important to me."

She opened her indoor season with the mixed 4 × 400 m relay during the European Indoor Championships for a home audience in Apeldoorn, Netherlands, on 6 March 2025. Her team, also including Nick Smidt, Eveline Saalberg, and Tony van Diepen, won a gold medal in a championship record of 3:15.63 min, which made them the fastest national team of all time in this short track event. This performance was not recognised as a world record because World Athletics had determined that the initial short track world record was to be 3:12.44 min or faster. It was also not recognised as European record, because the initial short track European record was to be 3:15.50 min or faster. It was, however, recognised as Dutch record. She continued at these championships with the women's 4 × 400 m relay on 9 March 2025. Teamed with Lieke Klaver, Nina Franke, and Cathelijn Peeters, she won a second gold medal in a Dutch record of 3:24.34 min. Half an hour after the race, the team was disqualified for hindering other runners, but this decision was successfully appealed and reversed.

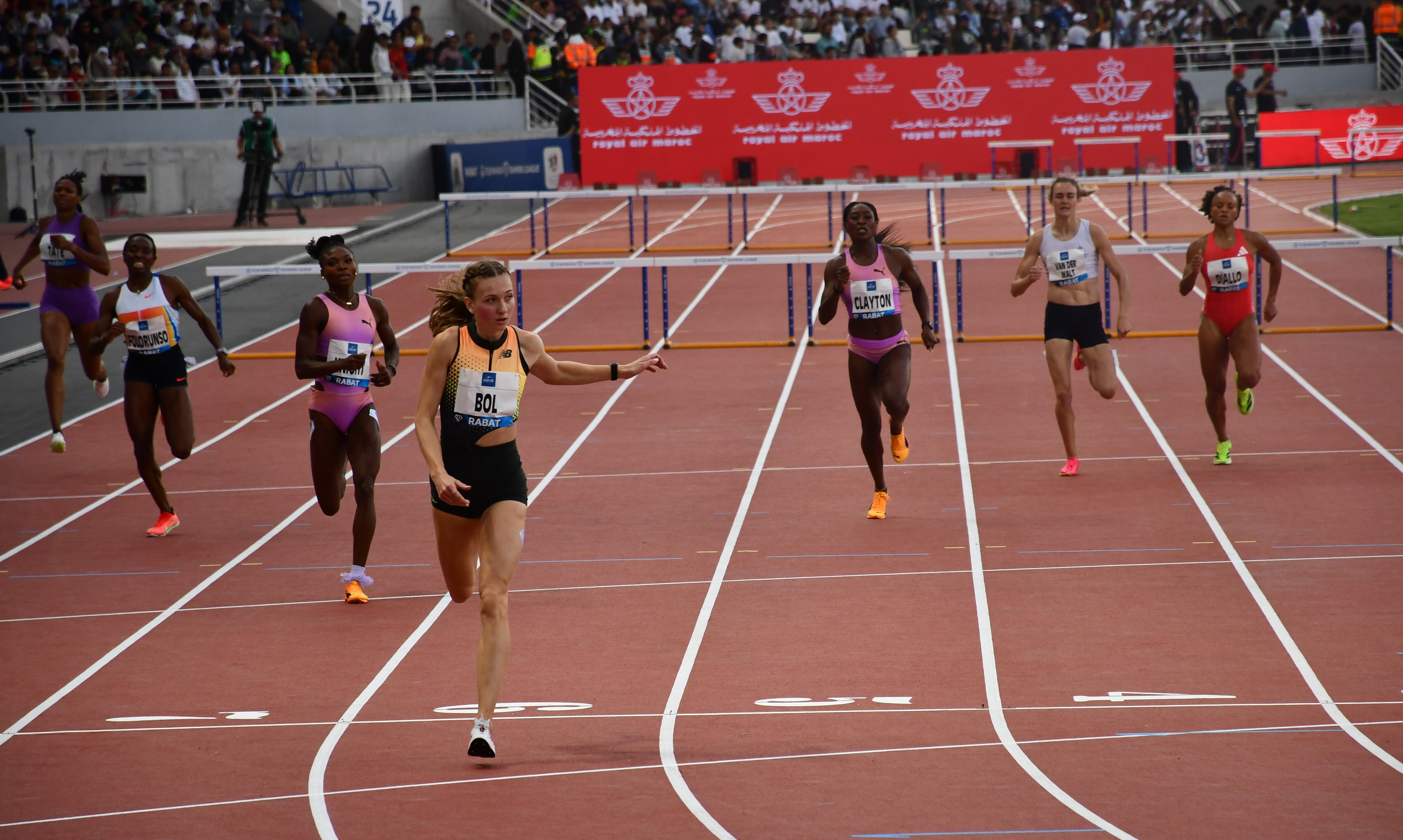
Bol (front) winning the 400 m hurdles race of the 2025 Rabat Diamond League

Bol opened her outdoor season with a 400 m hurdles race at the Rabat Diamond League in Morocco on 25 May, where she finished in a new meeting record of 52.46 s. She started with her nonpreferred leg, so she could take fourteen steps between the hurdles until the sixth hurdle, one hurdle less than in the previous season, and from there fifteen steps between the remaining hurdles while jumping with her preferred leg in an effort to become faster this season. Two weeks later, she continued with a meeting record of 52.51 s in the 400 m hurdles at the FBK Games in Hengelo, Netherlands. She broke her own meeting record with a time of 52.11 s at the Stockholm Diamond League meeting in Sweden on 15 June.

In Ostrava, Czech Republic, on 24 June, she ran a 400 metres and finished in third place in 49.98 s, behind Salwa Eid Nasser and Lynna Irby-Jackson. Three days later, at the 2025 European Athletics Team Championships First Division in Madrid, Spain, Bol won the 400 metres in a championship record of 49.48 s, which contributed to a fourth place overall for the team of the Netherlands, their highest ever position in these team championships.

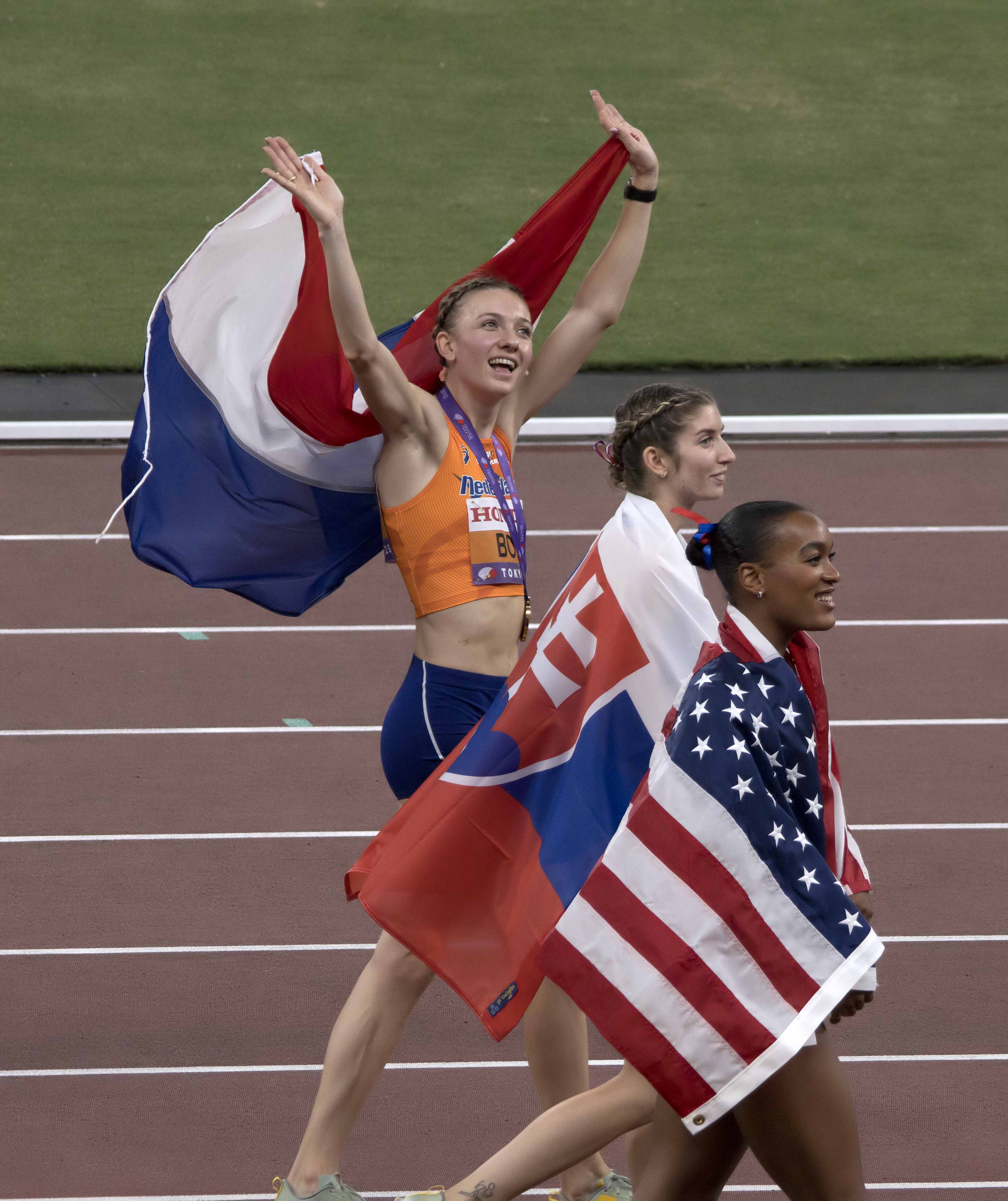
Bol (left) after successfully defending her world 400 m hurdles title in Tokyo

Back to the 400 m hurdles, Bol won the Monaco Diamond League on 11 July, setting a meeting record and world leading time of 51.95 s. She also won the London Diamond League on 19 July with a time of 52.10 s.

At the Dutch Championships on 3 August, Bol competed in the 200 m, where she ran 22.89 s in the heats and 22.84 s in the final, finishing in second place after Lieke Klaver. On 12 August, Bol won the 400 m hurdles in 52.24 s at the Gyulai István Memorial in Budapest, Hungary. On 16 August, she set a new meeting record and world leading time of 51.91 s in the 400 m hurdles at the Silesia Diamond League meeting in Chorzów, Poland. In the Diamond League Final on 28 August, she set a new meeting record of 52.18 s in the 400 metres hurdles, which was her thirtieth consecutive hurdles victory in the Diamond League and brought Bol her fifth Diamond League trophy.

At the World Championships in Tokyo, Bol successfully defended her world title in the 400 m hurdles, and set a world leading time of 51.54 s on 19 September. She stayed undefeated in the 400 m hurdles throughout the 2025 season. Bol also won a silver medal in the mixed 4 × 400 m relay with a time of 3:09.96 min and a bronze medal in the women's 4 × 400 m relay with a time of 3:20.18 min with the Dutch team.

On 10 October, Bol announced her intention to leave the 400 m hurdles behind and move up in distance to the 800 m for the 2026 season. On 25 October, Bol became European Athlete of the Year for the third time.

=== 2026: Switch to 800 metres with Dutch records and double European medalist ===
800 m PB progression
Date	Time	Rank
8 February 2026	1:59.07 i	353 (Note: When only short track results are considered, this personal best performance was #47.)
16 June 2026	1:57.13	100
28 June 2026	1:55.60	24
14 August 2026	1:55.54	21
21 August 2026	1:55.41	18
27 August 2026	1:54.71	9

On 8 February, Bol opened her 2026 indoor season with an 800 m race in Metz, France. It was the first time she competed over this distance as a senior athlete. She won in a new Dutch indoor record of 1:59.07 min, breaking the 25-year-old record of Ester Goossens from 2001 and qualifying for the 2026 World Indoor Championships. During a training camp in January, Bol had sustained a foot tendon injury, which led her to withdraw from her only other planned race of this year's indoor season, a 600 m record attempt in Liévin, France.

On 16 June, Broeders-Bol ran her first outdoor 800 m in 1:57.13 min, finishing in second place behind Audrey Werro at the Golden Spike in Ostrava, Czech Republic, which made her the third-fastest Dutchwoman ever behind Ellen van Langen and Sifan Hassan. On 21 June, she won the 800 m in 1:57.41 min at the FBK Games in Hengelo, Netherlands. On 28 June, Broeders-Bol improved her personal best in the 800 m to 1:55.60 min at the 2026 Meeting de Paris, again finishing in second place behind Werro, while moving up a place on the Dutch all-time list surpassing Hassan. On 18 July, Broeders-Bol ran the 800 m in 1:56.46 min, finishing second behind Keely Hodgkinson in the 2026 London Athletics Meet. On 21 July, Broeders-Bol received her first World Athletics Ranking for the 800 m: she was ranked No. 6 based on her five races.

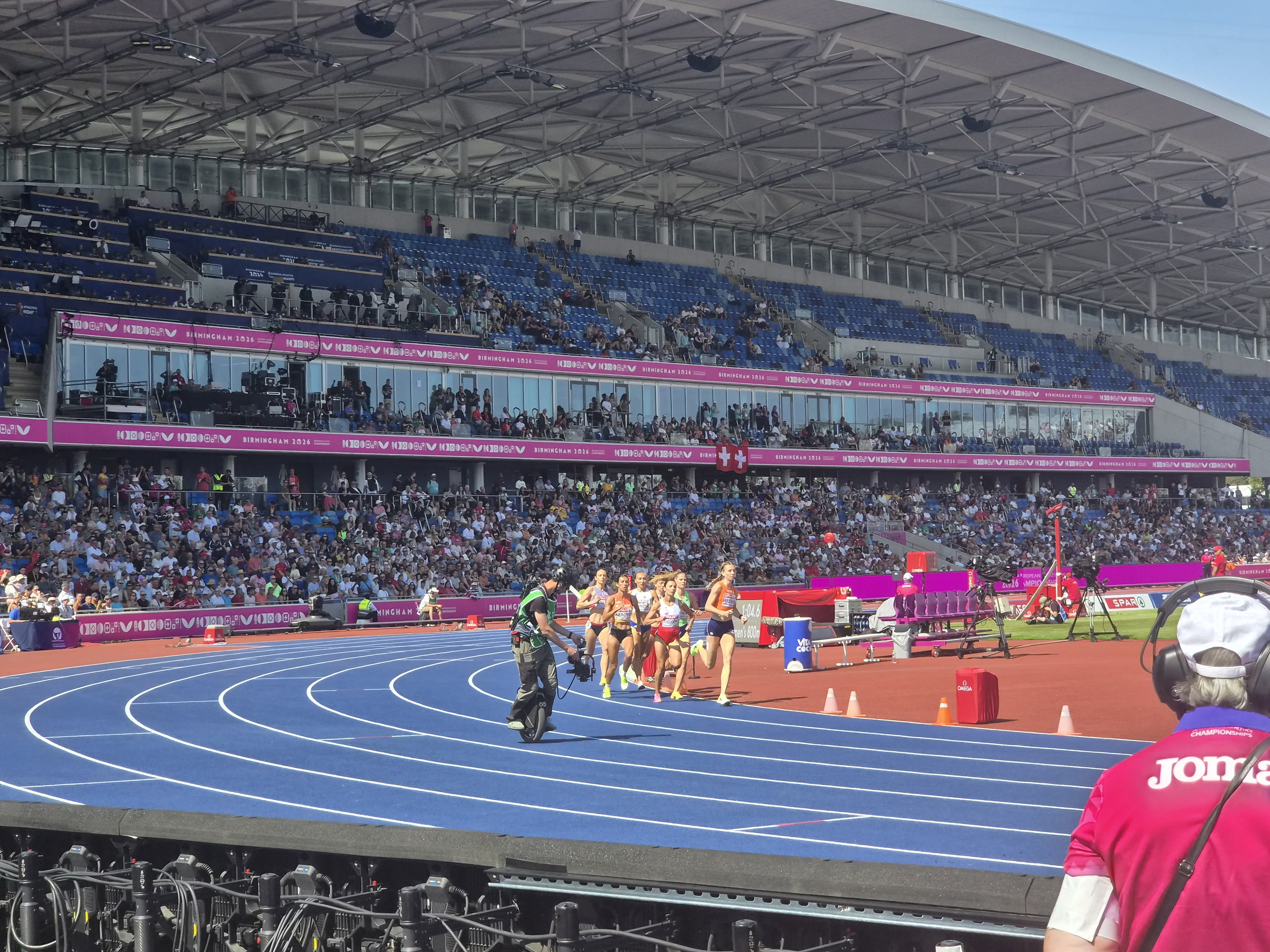
Broeders-Bol (right) leading in the first-round heat of the 800 m at the 2026 European Championships in Birmingham

At the European Championships in Birmingham, United Kingdom, Broeders-Bol competed individually in the 800 metres. On 11 August, she finished first in her first-round heat in 1:59.96 min and qualified for the semi-finals. On 13 August, Broeders-Bol finished second behind Hodgkinson in 1:57.46 min in the semi-final heat, advancing to the final. On 14 August, Broeders-Bol won the bronze medal in 1:55.54 min, further improving her personal best to equal the Dutch outdoor record of Van Langen from 1992, behind Werro and Hodgkinson. After the final, Broeders-Bol said in an interview about her transition to the 800 m: "This season goes well beyond expectations." On 16 August, she also competed in the women's 4 × 400 m relay final. She anchored the Dutch team to win a gold medal in 3:21.10 min, ahead of the British and Italian teams. It was her third consecutive title in this relay at the European Championships.

On 21 August, Broeders-Bol improved the Dutch 800 m outdoor record to 1:55.41 min, finishing in second place behind Werro at 2026 Athletissima in Lausanne. Van Langen said about Broeders-Bol breaking her 34-year-old record: "Femke is a great athlete and I am very happy that she is my successor." On 27 August, she lowered her Dutch national record by 0.70 s to 1:54.71 min, finishing second behind Werro once again and ahead of Georgia Hunter Bell at the 2026 Weltklasse Zürich. On 5 September, Broeders-Bol competed in the Diamond League final of the 800 m at the 2026 Memorial Van Damme in Brussels, where she finished in second place in 1:54.81 min, "just 0.06" s behind Werro.

At the inaugural World Ultimate Championship in Budapest, Hungary, Broeders-Bol competed in the 800 m. On 11 September, in her semi-final heat, she finished in second place behind Werro in 1:59.19 min, qualifying for the final. On 12 September, she finished in third place behind Werro and Hodgkinson in 1:56.74 in the final.

== Personal bests ==
=== Individual events ===
Personal best times for individual events
Event		Time	Location	Date	Record	Notes
60 metres		7.73 i	Apeldoorn, Netherlands	1 February 2020		
100 metres		11.47	Willemstad, Curaçao	28 April 2024		(Wind: −0.3 m/s)
150 metres		17.10	Willemstad, Curaçao	28 April 2024		(Wind: −0.9 m/s)
200 metres	short track	22.64 i	Metz, France	3 February 2024	NR	Broeders-Bol's outright 200 m best
200 metres	long track	22.80	Hengelo, Netherlands	30 June 2024		(Wind: +1.9 m/s)
400 metres	short track	49.17 i	Glasgow, United Kingdom	2 March 2024	WR	Broeders-Bol's outright 400 m best
400 metres	long track	49.44	Munich, Germany	17 August 2022	NR NU23R	
500 metres	short track	1:05.63 i	Boston, United States	4 February 2023	WB	
800 metres	long track	1:54.71	Zürich, Switzerland	27 August 2026	NR	
800 metres	short track	1:59.07 i	Metz, France	8 February 2026	NR	
300 metres hurdles		36.86	Ostrava, Czech Republic	31 May 2022	WB WU23B	
400 metres hurdles		50.95	La Chaux-de-Fonds, Switzerland	14 July 2024	AR	Second-fastest woman of all time

==== Season's bests ====
Season's best times for individual events
Year	200 m long track	200 m short track	400 m long track	400 m short track	800 m long track	800 m short track	400 m hurdles
2015	—N/a	—N/a	56.14	—N/a	—N/a	—N/a	—N/a
2016	25.56	—N/a	54.95	55.95 i	—N/a	—N/a	—N/a
2017	25.18	25.15 i	54.39	54.47 i	—N/a	2:19.51 i	—N/a
2018	25.09	—N/a	54.33	54.58 i	—N/a	—N/a	—N/a
2019	23.79	—N/a	52.98	53.24 i	—N/a	—N/a	55.32
2020	23.40	—N/a	51.13	52.47 i	—N/a	—N/a	53.79
2021	23.16	23.52 i	50.37	50.63 i	—N/a	—N/a	52.03
2022	23.00	23.37 i	**49.44**	50.30 i	—N/a	—N/a	52.27
2023	22.88	22.87 i	49.82	49.26 i	—N/a	—N/a	51.45
2024	**22.80**	**22.64** i	50.02	**49.17** i	—N/a	—N/a	**50.95**
2025	22.84	—N/a	49.48	—N/a	—N/a	—N/a	51.54
2026	—N/a	—N/a	—N/a	—N/a	**1:54.71**	**1:59.07** i	—N/a

Key: Lifetime best (in bold)

=== Team events ===
Personal best times for team events
Type	Event	Time	Location	Date	Record	Notes
Women's	4 × 400 metres relay	3:19.50	Saint-Denis, France (Note: This race was held in the Stade de France that is located in Saint-Denis, France, but World Athletics lists Paris, France, as the location for this race.)	10 August 2024	NR	Teamed with Lieke Klaver, Cathelijn Peeters, and Lisanne de Witte. Bol's split time for the anchor leg was 48.62 s.
Women's	4 × 400 metres relay short track	3:24.34 i	Apeldoorn, Netherlands	9 March 2025	NR	Third-fastest national team of all time. Teamed with Lieke Klaver, Nina Franke, and Cathelijn Peeters. Bol's split time for the anchor leg was 50.42 s.
Mixed	4 × 400 metres relay	3:07.43	Saint-Denis, France	3 August 2024	AR	Second-fastest national team of all time. Teamed with Eugene Omalla, Lieke Klaver, and Isaya Klein Ikkink. Bol's split time for the anchor leg was 48.00 s.
Mixed	4 × 400 metres relay short track	3:15.63 i	Apeldoorn, Netherlands	6 March 2025	NR	Second-fastest national team of all time. World best performance until 21 March 2026, when it was broken by the team of Belgium. (Note: The time was not recognized as a world record, because the target for the initial short track world record was 3:12.44 min or faster, but it was a world best performance as the fastest performance in the world up to that time.) Teamed with Nick Smidt, Eveline Saalberg, and Tony van Diepen. Bol's split time for the anchor leg was 50.3 s.

== World records ==
In her career, Broeders-Bol set three world records in the 400 metres short track and three world best performances in the 300 metres hurdles, 500 metres short track, and mixed 4 × 400 metres relay short track.

World records and world best performances
Event	Time	Record	Location	Date	Video	Ref.
300 metres hurdles	**36.86**	WB	Ostrava, Czech Republic	31 May 2022	link	
500 metres short track	**1:05.63 i**	WB	Boston, United States	4 February 2023	link	
400 metres short track	49.26 i	WR	Apeldoorn, Netherlands	19 February 2023	link	
400 metres short track	49.24 i	WR	Apeldoorn, Netherlands	18 February 2024	link	
400 metres short track	**49.17 i**	WR	Glasgow, United Kingdom	2 March 2024	link	
Mixed 4 × 400 metres relay short track	3:15.63 i	WB	Apeldoorn, Netherlands	6 March 2025	link	

Key: Current record (in bold)

== World rankings ==
In her career, Broeders-Bol has had four event rankings and an overall ranking in the World Athletics Rankings.

Highest world rankings per year
Year	Event				Overall
Year	200 m	400 m	800 m	400 m hurdles	Overall
2019	—N/a	180	—N/a	43	867
2020	—N/a	—N/a	—N/a	39	737
2021	167	8	—N/a	**1**	4
2022	—N/a	4	—N/a	**1**	5
2023	—N/a	**3**	—N/a	**1**	**2**
2024	**40**	**3**	—N/a	**1**	**2**
2025	—N/a	—N/a	—N/a	**1**	3
2026	—N/a	—N/a	**3**	**1**	**2**

Key: Lifetime best (in bold)

== Competition results ==
=== International competitions ===
Achievements in international competitions representing the Netherlands
Year	Competition	Location	Position	Event	Time	Notes
2015	European Youth Olympic Festival	Tbilisi, Georgia	11th (h)	400 m	57.41	
2017	European U20 Championships	Grosseto, Italy	12th (sf)	400 m	54.74	
2019	World Relays	Yokohama, Japan	7th	4 × 400 m relay	3:29.03	1st in Final B (52.9 split)
2019	European U20 Championships	Borås, Sweden	1st	400 m hurdles	56.25	
2019	European Team Championships, First League	Sandnes, Norway	2nd (Note: At the European Team Championships, athletes contribute to their teams' overall ranking with their individual results, but they don't receive medals for the individual events.)	400 m hurdles	56.97	
2019	European Team Championships, First League	Sandnes, Norway	4th	Team	259 pts	
2019	World Championships	Doha, Qatar	22nd (sf)	400 m hurdles	56.37	(NU20R in heat)
2019	World Championships	Doha, Qatar	7th	4 × 400 m relay	3:27.89	(52.1 split) (Note: Dutch team ran 3:27.40 min in the heats, where Bol also had a split time 52.1 s.)
2021	European Indoor Championships	Toruń, Poland	1st	400 m	50.63 i	NR
2021	European Indoor Championships	Toruń, Poland	1st	4 × 400 m relay	3:27.15 i	CR NR (49.99 i split)
2021	World Relays	Chorzów, Poland	4th	4 × 400 m relay	3:30.12	(50.58 split) (Note: Dutch team ran 3:28.40 min in the heats.)
2021	World Relays	Chorzów, Poland	8th	4 × 400 m mixed	3:18.04	NR (50.72 split) (Note: Time and split from the heats; Bol was replaced in the final in which Dutch team clocked 3:21.02 min.)
2021	European Team Championships, First League	Cluj-Napoca, Romania	1st	400 m	50.37	CR NR
2021	European Team Championships, First League	Cluj-Napoca, Romania	3rd	Team	300 pts	
2021	Olympic Games	Tokyo, Japan	4th	4 × 400 m mixed	3:10.36	NR (49.74 split)
2021	Olympic Games	Tokyo, Japan	3rd	400 m hurdles	52.03	AR
2021	Olympic Games	Tokyo, Japan	6th	4 × 400 m relay	3:23.74	NR (48.97 split)
2022	World Indoor Championships	Belgrade, Serbia	2nd	400 m	50.57 i	
2022	World Indoor Championships	Belgrade, Serbia	2nd	4 × 400 m relay	3:28.57 i	(50.26 i split)
2022	World Championships	Eugene, United States	2nd	4 × 400 m mixed	3:09.90	NR (48.95 split)
2022	World Championships	Eugene, United States	2nd	400 m hurdles	52.27	
2022	World Championships	Eugene, United States	– (r1)	4 × 400 m relay	DQ	TR24.6
2022	European Championships	Munich, Germany	1st	400 m	49.44	NR
2022	European Championships	Munich, Germany	1st	400 m hurdles	52.67	CR
2022	European Championships	Munich, Germany	1st	4 × 400 m relay	3:20.87	NR (48.52 split)
2023	European Indoor Championships	Istanbul, Turkey	1st	400 m	49.85 i	
2023	European Indoor Championships	Istanbul, Turkey	1st	4 × 400 m relay	3:25.66 i	CR NR (49.58 i split)
2023	European Games	Chorzów, Poland	1st (Note: At the 2023 European Games, athletes received medals of the European Games for individual events that were also part of the European Team Championships First Division.)	400 m	49.82	CR
2023	European Team Championships, First Division	Chorzów, Poland	1st	400 m	49.82	CR
2023	European Team Championships, First Division	Chorzów, Poland	6th	Team	339.50 pts	
2023	World Championships	Budapest, Hungary	– (f)	4 × 400 m mixed	DNF	
2023	World Championships	Budapest, Hungary	1st	400 m hurdles	51.70	
2023	World Championships	Budapest, Hungary	1st	4 × 400 m relay	3:20.72	NR (48.75 split)
2024	World Indoor Championships	Glasgow, United Kingdom	1st	400 m	49.17 i	WR
2024	World Indoor Championships	Glasgow, United Kingdom	1st	4 × 400 m relay	3:25.07 i	NR (50.54 i split)
2024	World Relays	Nassau, Bahamas	2nd	4 × 400 m mixed	3:11.45	(49.63 split)
2024	European Championships	Rome, Italy	3rd	4 × 400 m mixed	3:10.73	(49.21 split)
2024	European Championships	Rome, Italy	1st	400 m hurdles	52.49	CR
2024	European Championships	Rome, Italy	1st	4 × 400 m relay	3:22.39	(50.45 split)
2024	Olympic Games	Paris, France	1st	4 × 400 m mixed	3:07.43	AR (48.00 split)
2024	Olympic Games	Paris, France	3rd	400 m hurdles	52.15	
2024	Olympic Games	Paris, France	2nd	4 × 400 m relay	3:19.50	NR (48.62 split)
2025	European Indoor Championships	Apeldoorn, Netherlands	1st	4 × 400 m mixed	3:15.63 i	WB CR NR (50.3 i split)
2025	European Indoor Championships	Apeldoorn, Netherlands	1st	4 × 400 m relay	3:24.34 i	CR NR (50.42 i split)
2025	European Team Championships, First Division	Madrid, Spain	1st	400 m	49.48	CR
2025	European Team Championships, First Division	Madrid, Spain	4th	Team	384.5 pts	
2025	World Championships	Tokyo, Japan	2nd	4 × 400 m mixed	3:09.96	(50.06 split)
2025	World Championships	Tokyo, Japan	1st	400 m hurdles	51.54	
2025	World Championships	Tokyo, Japan	3rd	4 × 400 m relay	3:20.18	(49.10 split)
2026	European Championships	Birmingham, United Kingdom	3rd	800 m	1:55.54	=NR
2026	European Championships	Birmingham, United Kingdom	1st	4 × 400 m relay	3:21.10	(49.5 split)
2026	World Ultimate Championship	Budapest, Hungary	3rd (Note: At the World Athletics Ultimate Championship, the top three athletes don't receive medals, but only the winner receives a trophy.)	800 m	1:56.74	

=== Circuit wins and titles ===
- Diamond League

400 metres hurdles champion (5): 2021, 2022, 2023, 2024, 2025
400 metres hurdles wins, other events and times (in seconds) specified in parentheses:

- 2020 (2): Stockholm Bauhaus-Galan (54.68), Rome Golden Gala (53.90)
- 2021 (6): Rome Golden Gala in Florence (53.44 NR), Oslo Bislett Games (53.33 NR), Stockholm (52.37 DLR NR), Gateshead British Grand Prix (53.24), Lausanne Athletissima (53.05 MR), Zurich Weltklasse (52.80 MR)
- 2022 (6): Rome (53.02), Oslo (52.61 MR), Stockholm (52.27 DLR), Chorzów Kamila Skolimowska Memorial (400 m, 49.75 MR NR), Lausanne (52.95 MR), Zurich (53.03)
- 2023 (6): Rome Golden Gala in Florence (52.43 MR), Oslo (52.30 MR), Lausanne (52.76 MR), London (51.45 AR DLR MR), Brussels Memorial Van Damme (52.11 MR), Eugene Prefontaine Classic (51.98 MR)
- 2024 (5): Stockholm (53.07), London (51.30 DLR MR), Lausanne (52.25 MR), Chorzów (52.13 MR), Brussels (52.45)
- 2025 (6): Rabat Meeting International Mohammed VI d'Athlétisme (52.46 MR), Stockholm (52.11 MR), Monaco Herculis (51.95 MR), London (52.10), Chorzów (51.91 MR), Zurich (52.18 MR)

- World Athletics Continental Tour

400 metres hurdles wins, other events and times (in seconds) specified in parentheses:

- 2020 (3): Székesfehérvár Gyulai István Memorial (54.67), Ostrava Golden Spike (300 mH, 38.55 MR), Bellinzona Galà dei Castelli (54.33)
- 2021 (3): Hengelo FBK Games (54.33 MR), Székesfehérvár (52.81 MR NR), Bellinzona (54.01 MR)
- 2022 (2): Ostrava (300 mH, 36.86 WB), Hengelo (53.94 MR)
- 2023 (3): Oordegem International Flanders Athletics Meeting (53.12 MR), Hengelo (400 m, 50.11 MR), Bellinzona (52.79 MR)
- 2024 (2): Hengelo (400 m, 50.02 MR), La Chaux-de-Fonds Résisprint International (50.95 AR MR)
- 2025 (2): Hengelo (52.51 MR), Budapest Gyulai István Memorial (52.24)
- 2026 (1): Hengelo (800 m, 1:57.41)

- World Athletics Indoor Tour

400 metres short track wins, other events and times (in seconds or minutes:seconds) specified in parentheses:

- 2020 (1): Metz Meeting Moselle Athlélor (52.47 i)
- 2021 (2): Metz (50.81 i MR NR), Toruń Copernicus Cup (50.66 i MR NR)
- 2022 (2): Metz (50.72 i MR), Toruń (50.64 i MR)
- 2023 (4): Boston New Balance Indoor Grand Prix (500 m sh, 1:05.63 i WB), Metz (49.96 i MR NR) & (200 m sh, 22.87 i MR NR), Liévin Meeting Hauts-de-France Pas-de-Calais (50.20 i MR)
- 2024 (3): Metz (49.69 i MR) & (200 m sh, 22.64 i MR NR), Liévin (49.63 i MR)
- 2026 (1): Metz (800 m sh, 1:59.07 i NR)

=== National championships ===
Achievements at national championships representing AV Altis
Year	Competition	Location	Position	Event	Time	Notes
2015	Dutch U18 Championships	Breda	1st	400 m	56.14	
2016	Dutch U18 Indoor Championships	Apeldoorn	1st	400 m	56.74 i	
2016	Dutch Indoor Championships	Apeldoorn	6th	400 m	55.95 i	
2016	Dutch Championships	Amsterdam	4th	400 m	55.82	
2016	Dutch U18 Championships	Breda	1st	400 m	54.95	
2017	Dutch Indoor Championships	Apeldoorn	6th	400 m	54.47 i	
2017	Dutch U20/U18 Indoor Championships, U18 events	Apeldoorn	1st	400 m	55.48 i	
2017	Dutch U20/U18 Championships, U18 events	Vught	1st	400 m	54.39	
2018	Dutch U20 Indoor Championships	Apeldoorn	1st	400 m	54.93 i	
2018	Dutch Indoor Championships	Apeldoorn	5th	400 m	54.58 i	
2018	Dutch U20 Championships	Emmeloord	1st	400 m	54.91	
2018	Dutch Championships	Utrecht	6th	400 m	54.40	
2019	Dutch U20 Indoor Championships	Apeldoorn	1st	400 m	54.34 i	
2019	Dutch Indoor Championships	Apeldoorn	1st	400 m	53.24 i	NU20R
2019	Dutch U20 Championships	Alphen aan den Rijn	1st	400 m hurdles	57.87	
2019	Dutch U20 Championships	Alphen aan den Rijn	2nd	200 m	23.79	
2019	Dutch Championships	The Hague	7th	200 m	24.41	
2020	Dutch Indoor Championships	Apeldoorn	2nd	400 m	52.78 i	
2020	Dutch Championships	Utrecht	3rd	200 m	23.40	
2021	Dutch Indoor Championships	Apeldoorn	1st	400 m	50.64 i	
2021	Dutch Championships	Breda	4th	200 m	23.16	
2022	Dutch Indoor Championships	Apeldoorn	1st	400 m	50.30 i	NR
2022	Dutch Championships	Apeldoorn	2nd	200 m	23.05	(23.00 in heat)
2023	Dutch Indoor Championships	Apeldoorn	1st	400 m	49.26 i	WR
2023	Dutch Championships	Breda	2nd	200 m	23.05	(22.88 in heat)
2024	Dutch Indoor Championships	Apeldoorn	1st	400 m	49.24 i	WR
2024	Dutch Championships	Hengelo	3rd	200 m	22.80	
2025	Dutch Championships	Hengelo	2nd	200 m	22.84	

== Recognition ==
2020

- European Athlete of the Month for September 2020 of the European Athletic Association

2021

- European Athlete of the Month for June 2021 of the European Athletic Association
- European Athletics Rising Star of the Year of the European Athletic Association

2022

- European Athlete of the Month for June 2022 of the European Athletic Association
- Honorary Membership of AV Altis
- Sports Medal of the City of Amersfoort
- European Athlete of the Year of the European Athletic Association
- Dutch Athlete of the Year of the Royal Dutch Athletics Federation
- Dutch Sports Team of the Year of the NOC*NSF: women's 4 × 400 metres relay team (shared with Andrea Bouma, Lieke Klaver, Eveline Saalberg, Laura de Witte, and Lisanne de Witte)

2023

- Membership of Merit of the Royal Dutch Athletics Federation
- World Indoor Athlete of the Year of Track & Field News
- European Athlete of the Year of the European Athletic Association
- Dutch Athlete of the Year of the Royal Dutch Athletics Federation
- International Female Athlete of the Year of Athletics Weekly (Readers' Choice Awards)
- Dutch Sports Team of the Year of the NOC*NSF: women's 4 × 400 metres relay team (shared with Lieke Klaver, Cathelijn Peeters, Eveline Saalberg, and Lisanne de Witte)
- Dutch Sportswoman of the Year of the NOC*NSF

2024

- World Indoor Athlete of the Year of Track & Field News
- Golden Crown in the women's sprints and hurdles category at the European Championships of the European Athletic Association
- Flag bearer for the Netherlands at the Summer Olympics closing ceremony
- Knight of the Order of Orange-Nassau
- Jacob van Campen Medal of the City of Amersfoort (honorary citizenship)
- TeamNL Kids Hero of the Year of the NOC*NSF

2025

- European Athlete of the Year of the European Athletic Association

== Notes ==
Records
Preceded by Margarita Ponomaryova	Women's 400 m hurdles European U23 record holder 1 July 2021 – present	Incumbent
Preceded by Yuliya Pechonkina	Women's 400 m hurdles European record holder 4 August 2021 – present	Incumbent
Preceded by Jarmila Kratochvílová	Women's 400 m short track world record holder 19 February 2023 – present	Incumbent
Achievements
Preceded by Dalilah Muhammad	Women's 400 m hurdles season's best performance 2020; 2023; 2025	Succeeded by Sydney McLaughlin
Preceded by Sydney McLaughlin-Levrone	Women's 400 m hurdles season's best performance 2020; 2023; 2025	Succeeded by Sydney McLaughlin-Levrone
Preceded by Sydney McLaughlin-Levrone	Women's 400 m hurdles season's best performance 2020; 2023; 2025	Succeeded by Anna Cockrell
Awards
Preceded by Yaroslava Mahuchikh	Women's European Athletics Rising Star of the Year; 2021	Succeeded by Elina Tzengko
Preceded by Sifan Hassan	Women's European Athlete of the Year; 2022, 2023; 2025	Succeeded by Yaroslava Mahuchikh
Preceded by Yaroslava Mahuchikh	Women's European Athlete of the Year; 2022, 2023; 2025	Most recent
Preceded by Sifan Hassan	Dutch Athlete of the Year; 2022, 2023	Succeeded by Sifan Hassan
Preceded by Irene Schouten	Dutch Sportswoman of the Year; 2023	Succeeded by Sifan Hassan
Olympic Games
Preceded by Lois Abbingh; Worthy de Jong	Flag bearer for the Netherlands; 2024 closing ceremony With: Harrie Lavreysen	Succeeded by Kimberley Bos; Jens van 't Wout
