= 2024 World Athletics Indoor Championships – Women's 400 metres =

Women's 400 metres at the 2024 World Athletics Indoor Championships
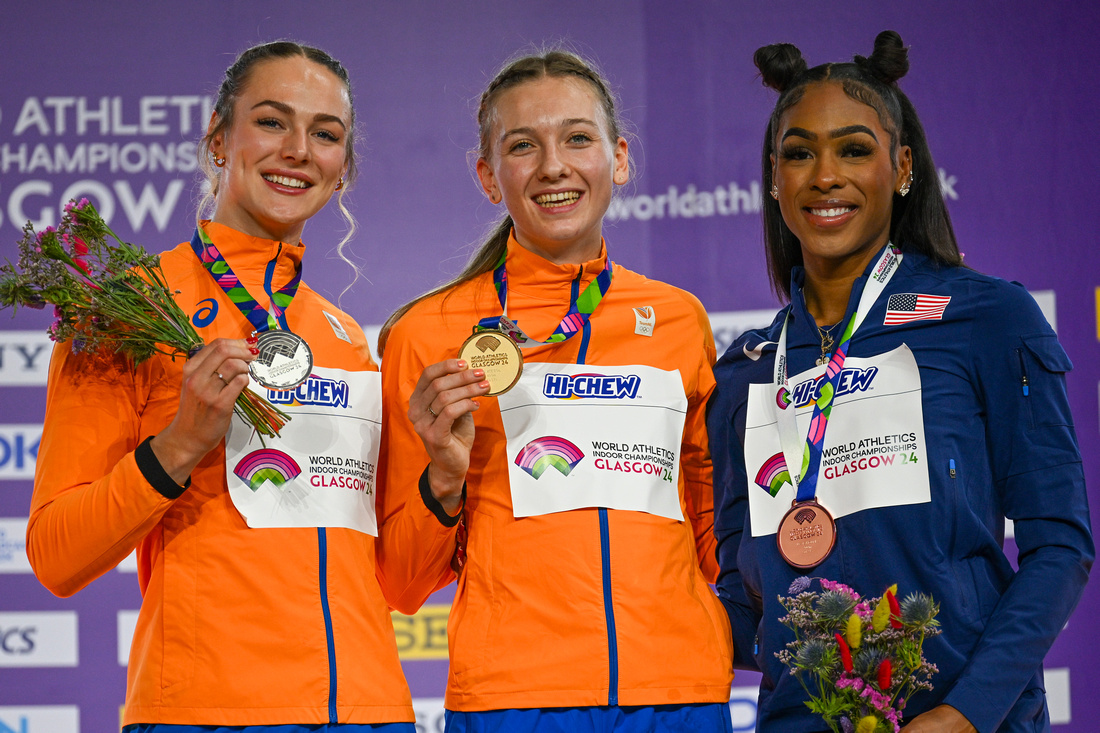
- Medalists Lieke Klaver, Femke Bol, and Alexis Holmes
- Venue: Commonwealth Arena
- Location: Glasgow, United Kingdom
- Dates: 1 March 2024 (round 1 and semi-finals); 2 March 2024 (final)
- Competitors: 24 from 19 nations
- Winning time: 49.17 s WR

Medalists
gold medal	Femke Bol	Netherlands
silver medal	Lieke Klaver	Netherlands
bronze medal	Alexis Holmes	United States

The women's 400 metres at the 2024 World Athletics Indoor Championships took place over three rounds at the Commonwealth Arena in Glasgow, United Kingdom, on 1 and 2 March 2024. This was the nineteenth time that the women's 400 metres was contested at the World Athletics Indoor Championships. Twenty-four athletes from nineteen different nations competed in the event.

The four heats of round 1 were held in the morning of 1 March, where twelve athletes qualified for the next round. Susanne Gogl-Walli of Austria set a national record of 51.43 seconds. The two heats of the semi-finals were held in the evening of 1 March, where six athletes qualified for the final round. Sharlene Mawdsley of Ireland was disqualified for obstruction.

The final was held in the evening of 2 March. Femke Bol of the Netherlands won the gold medal finishing in a new short track world record of 49.17 seconds, followed by Lieke Klaver of the Netherlands in 50.16 seconds and Alexis Holmes of the United States in 50.24 seconds. Gogl-Walli set another Austrian record of 51.37 seconds.

== Background ==
The women's 400 metres had been contested at every edition of the World Athletics Indoor Championships, meaning the event had taken place eighteen times before. The 2024 World Athletics Indoor Championships were held at the indoor 200-metres track of the Commonwealth Arena in Glasgow, Scotland, United Kingdom.

On 18 February 2024, Femke Bol of the Netherlands had broken the 400 metres short track world record with a time of 49.24 s at the Dutch Indoor Athletics Championships. The championship record of 50.04 s had been set by Olesya Forsheva of Russia in 2006.

Records before the 2024 World Athletics Indoor Championships
Record	Athlete (Nation)	Time	Location	Date
World record	Femke Bol (NED)	49.24	Apeldoorn, Netherlands	18 February 2024
World leading	Femke Bol (NED)	49.24	Apeldoorn, Netherlands	18 February 2024
Championship record	Olesya Forsheva (RUS)	50.04	Moscow, Russia	12 March 2006

== Qualification ==
For this event, the qualification period was from 1 January 2023 until 18 February 2024. Athletes could qualify by running the entry standards (or faster) of 51.60 s on 200-metre indoor tracks or 50.50 s on 400-metre outdoor tracks, by receiving a wild card for winning the event at the World Athletics Indoor Tour in 2023 or 2024, or by their position on the World Athletics Ranking for the event up to the target of 30 athletes. A final entry list containing twenty-five athletes from nineteen nations was issued on 24 February 2024.

== Results ==
=== Round 1 ===
The four heats of round 1 were held on 1 March, starting at 10:22 (UTC) in the morning. Of the 24 competing athletes, the first two in each heat (Q) and the next four fastest (q) qualified for the semi-finals. In the second heat, Susanne Gogl-Walli set an Austrian record (NR) of 51.43 seconds. In the third heat, three athletes finished second in 52.229 seconds and all were advanced to the next round (Q), leaving only two instead of four time-fastest spots (q) for the semi-finals.

Results of round 1
Rank	Heat	Lane	Name	Nation	Time	Notes
1	2	6	Lieke Klaver	Netherlands	51.31	Q
2	2	4	Susanne Gogl-Walli	Austria	51.43	Q, NR
3	1	5	Laviai Nielsen	(United Kingdom) Great Britain & N.I.	51.82	Q
4	2	5	Lada Vondrová	Czech Republic	51.94	q
5	4	6	Femke Bol	Netherlands	52.00	Q
6	2	3	Stacey-Ann Williams	Jamaica	52.16	q
7	3	5	Talitha Diggs	United States	52.17 (52.167)	Q
8	1	6	Andrea Miklós	Romania	52.17 (52.168)	Q
9	3	3	Sharlene Mawdsley	Ireland	52.23 (52.229)	Q (Note: Although only the top two places per heat were set to automatically advance, there was a three-way dead heat for 2nd place in the third heat. This meant that all three second-place finishers advanced, and because only twelve spots were available for the semifinals, there were two less time qualifiers than expected, and Tereza Petržilková and Cátia Azevedo did not advance in accordance with rule 21.4 of the competition rules.)
9	3	6	Henriette Jæger	Norway	52.23 (52.229)	Q
9	3	4	Amandine Brossier	France	52.23 (52.229)	Q
12	1	3	Tereza Petržilková	Czech Republic	52.31	
13	4	5	Alexis Holmes	United States	52.53	Q
14	1	4	Cátia Azevedo	Portugal	52.92	
15	4	4	Charokee Young	Jamaica	53.04	
16	1	2	Eva Santidrián	Spain	53.07	
17	2	1	Gunta Vaičule	Latvia	53.09	SB
18	4	1	Ayomide Folorunso	Italy	53.15	
19	4	3	Tiffani Marinho	Brazil	53.48	
20	4	2	Grace Claxton	Puerto Rico	54.62	
21	3	2	Lauren Hoffman	Philippines	54.66	
22	2	2	Yanique Haye-Smith	Turks and Caicos Islands	54.98	SB
23	1	1	Shalysa Wray	Cayman Islands	55.82	SB
24	3	1	Tábata de Carvalho	Brazil	57.73	

=== Semi-finals ===
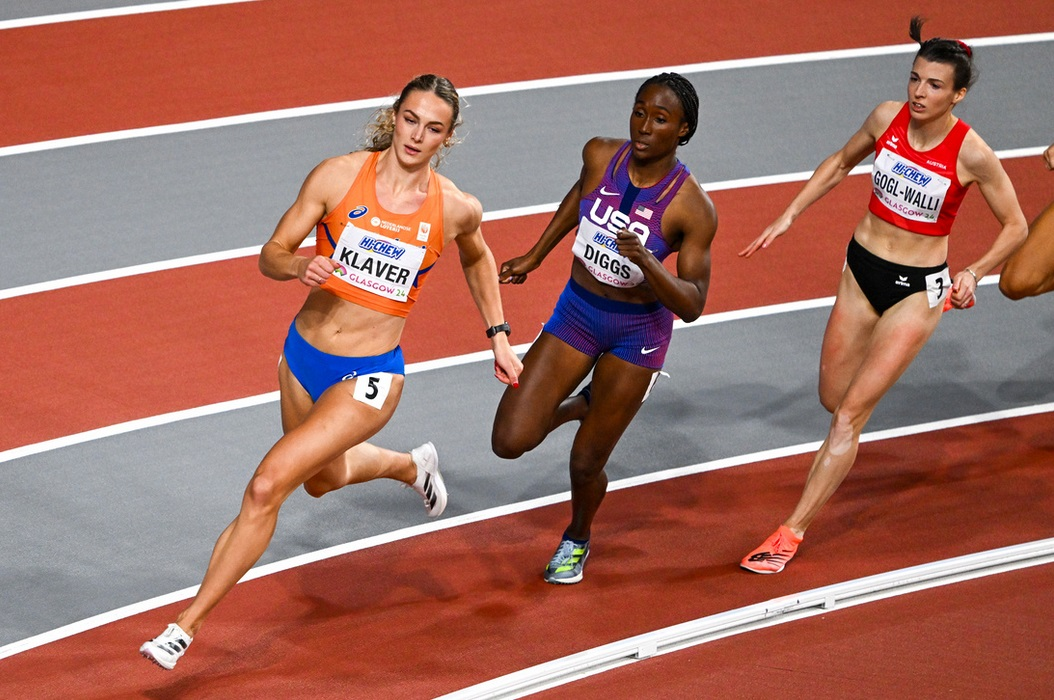
Lieke Klaver, Talitha Diggs, and Susanne Gogl-Walli during the first heat of the semi-finals

The two semi-final heats were held on 1 March, starting at 20:50 (UTC) in the evening. Of the twelve competing athletes, the first three in each heat qualified (Q) for the final. In the first heat, Lieke Klaver received a yellow card for disturbing the start, and Sharlene Mawdsley was disqualified (DQ) for obstruction during the race. In an interview, Klaver said about the warning: "I immediately felt that my left leg was trembling a bit, so I knew that if they are giving something like a card, then it will be yellow for me. Yeah, I wasn't worried."

Results of the semi-finals
Rank	Heat	Lane	Name	Nation	Time	Notes
1	2	5	Femke Bol	Netherlands	50.66	Q
2	2	2	Alexis Holmes	United States	50.99	Q
3	1	5	Lieke Klaver	Netherlands	51.18	Q
4	1	6	Talitha Diggs	United States	51.28	Q
5	2	6	Laviai Nielsen	(United Kingdom) Great Britain & N.I.	51.44	Q
6	2	3	Henriette Jæger	Norway	51.48	
7	2	4	Andrea Miklós	Romania	51.83	
8	1	3	Susanne Gogl-Walli	Austria	52.47	Q
9	2	1	Lada Vondrová	Czech Republic	52.48	
10	1	1	Stacey-Ann Williams	Jamaica	52.72	
11	1	2	Amandine Brossier	France	53.26	
	1	4	Sharlene Mawdsley	Ireland	DQ	TR17.1.2[O] (Note: World Athletics rule TR17.1.2[O] for obstruction)

=== Final ===
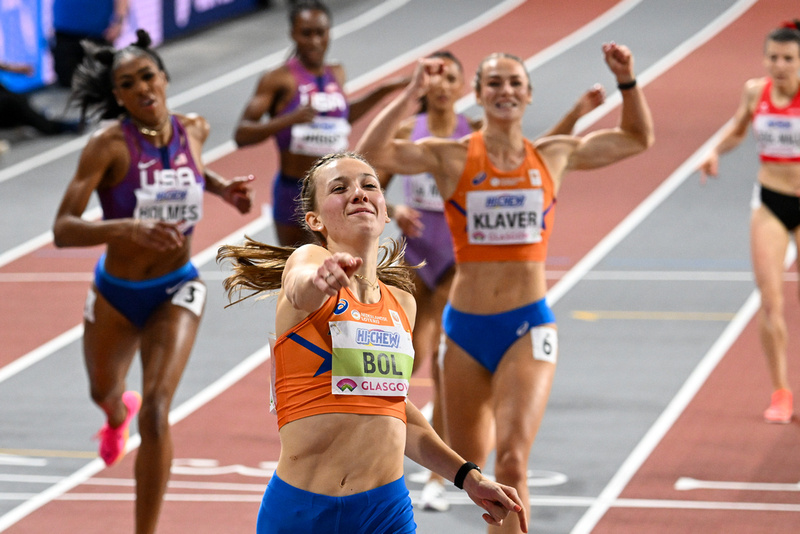
Femke Bol ahead of the other competitors right after she broke the world record in the final

The final was held on 2 March, starting at 21:02 (UTC) in the evening. Femke Bol of the Netherlands led early in the race and had the fastest intermediate times at 100 metres of 11.89 s, at 200 metres of 23.61 s, and at 300 metres of 36.06 s. Bol won the race in 49.17 seconds, improving her own 400 metres short track world record (WR) by 0.07 seconds and the championship record by Olesya Forsheva by 0.87 seconds. She was followed 0.99 seconds later by Lieke Klaver of the Netherlands, who finished in second place in 50.16 seconds. Alexis Holmes of the United States finished third in 50.24 seconds in a new personal best (PB). Laviai Nielsen also ran a personal best of 50.89 seconds, and Susanne Gogl-Walli set another Austrian record (NR) of 51.37 seconds.

For Reuters, Lori Ewing wrote that Bol "made it look effortless". For Athletics Weekly, Jason Henderson described Bol's performance as one "that oozed controlled power". For Olympics.com, Rory Jiwani reported that Bol "enhanced her status as one of the stars of track and field with a stunning triumph". Bol herself said in an interview: "I knew I needed a really good race to win this gold. I knew I had to open fast, and once you open fast you have to keep going because you'll die anyway! It's amazing to also run a world record again. I was hoping to be in the 49... my coaches thought I could do it but I really wanted the gold."

Results of the final
Rank	Lane	Name	Nation	Time	Notes
1st place, gold medalist(s)	5	Femke Bol	Netherlands	49.17	WR
2nd place, silver medalist(s)	6	Lieke Klaver	Netherlands	50.16	
3rd place, bronze medalist(s)	3	Alexis Holmes	United States	50.24	PB
4	2	Laviai Nielsen	(United Kingdom) Great Britain & N.I.	50.89	PB
5	4	Talitha Diggs	United States	51.23	=SB
6	1	Susanne Gogl-Walli	Austria	51.37	NR
