= Galà dei Castelli =

Annual track and field event in Switzerland, part of World Athletics Continental Tour

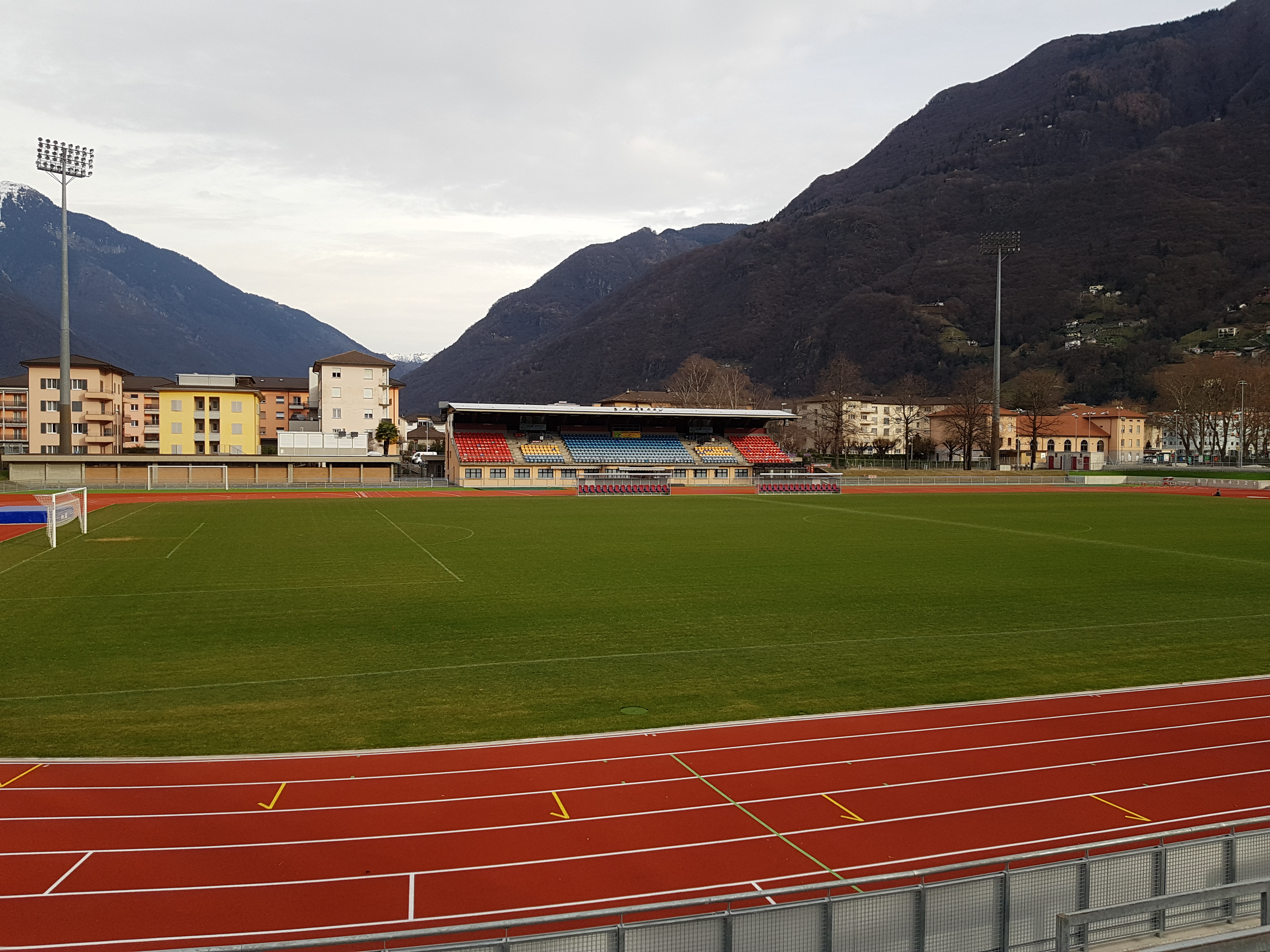
- Date: September
- Location: Bellinzona, Switzerland
- Event type: Track and field
- Established: 2011
- Website: www.galathletics.ch/en/

The Galà dei Castelli is an annual track and field meet that takes place at the Stadio Comunale Bellinzona in Bellinzona, Switzerland and is currently classified among the silver standard World Athletics Continental Tour meetings. It was first held in 2011.

In 2025 the meeting was canceled for financial reasons, in particular the cantonal taxes. It returned in 2026 under a new name, GalAthletics Bellinzona.

== Meeting records ==
=== Men ===
Men's meeting records of the Galà dei Castelli
| Event | Record | Athlete | Nationality | Date | Ref. |
|---|---|---|---|---|---|
| 100 m | 9.87 (±0.0 m/s) | Asafa Powell | Jamaica | 21 July 2015 | |
| 200 m | 20.19 (+1.1 m/s) | Alexander Ogando | Dominican Republic | 9 September 2024 | |
| 400 m | 44.33 | Wayde van Niekerk | South Africa | 12 September 2022 | |
| 800 m | 1:43.57 | Louey Ouerrat | France | 30 August 2026 | |
| 1000 m | 2:30.15 | Stefano Gualdi | Italy | 27 July 2002 | |
| 1500 m | 3:33.98 | Reynold Cheruiyot | Kenya | 4 September 2023 | |
| 3000 m | 7:37.49 | William Kalya | Kenya | 18 August 1997 | |
| 5000 m | 13:12.54 | Cornelius Kangogo | Kenya | 6 June 2016 | |
| 110 m hurdles | 13.10 (−1.1 m/s) | Colin Jackson | Great Britain | 1 July 1998 | |
| 400 m hurdles | 47.50 | Alison dos Santos | Brazil | 4 September 2023 | |
| 3000 m steeplechase | 8:14.06 | Jonathan Kandie | Kenya | 1 July 1998 | |
| High jump | 2.28 m | JuVaughn Harrison | United States | 30 August 2026 | |
| Pole vault | 5.81 m | Ernest John Obiena | Philippines | 12 September 2022 | |
| Long jump | 8.19 m (±0.0 m/s) | Tajay Gayle | Jamaica | 18 July 2018 | |
| Triple jump | 15.64 m (−2.1 m/s) | Gianni Cecconi | Italy | 14 July 1990 | |
| Shot put | 22.28 m | Ryan Crouser | United States | 1 September 2019 | |
| Discus throw | 71.50 m | Mykolas Alekna | Lithuania | 30 August 2026 | |
| Javelin throw | 84.48 m | Roman Avramenko | Ukraine | 11 June 2013 | |

=== Women ===
Women's meeting records of the Galà dei Castelli
| Event | Record | Athlete | Nationality | Date | Ref. |
|---|---|---|---|---|---|
| 100 m | 10.78 (+0.5 m/s) | Shelly-Ann Fraser-Pryce | Jamaica | 14 September 2021 | |
| 200 m | 22.09 (±0.0 m/s) | Merlene Ottey | Jamaica | 12 July 1996 | |
| 400 m | 51.12 | Madiea Ghafoor | Netherlands | 18 July 2018 | |
| 800 m | 1:57.53 | Natoya Goule | Jamaica | 4 September 2023 | |
| 1000 m | 2:37.26 | Letitia Vriesde | Surinam | 12 July 1996 | |
| 1500 m | 3:57.54 | Nadia Battocletti | Italy | 30 August 2026 | |
| Mile | 4:19.30 | Gabriela Szabo | Romania | 1 July 1998 | |
| 5000 m | 14:36.13 | Agnes Tirop | Kenya | 18 July 2018 | |
| 100 m hurdles | 12.44 (+0.7 m/s) | Rayniah Jones | United States | 30 August 2026 | |
| 400 m hurdles | 52.79 | Femke Bol | Netherlands | 4 September 2023 | |
| High jump | 1.94 m | Hanne Haugland | Norway | 1 September 1999 | |
| High jump | 1.94 m | Iryna Gerashchenko | Ukraine | 1 September 2019 | |
| Pole vault | 4.80 m | Sandi Morris | United States | 3 September 2023 | |
| Long jump | 7.05 m (+1.5 m/s) | Inessa Kravets | Ukraine | 12 July 1996 | |
| Triple jump | 14.19 m (+1.7 m/s) | Inna Lasovskaya | Russia | 20 June 1995 | |
| Shot put | 18.55 m | Ramona Pagel | United States | 14 July 1990 | |
| Discus throw | 71.41 m | Sandra Perković | Croatia | 18 July 2017 | |
| Javelin throw | 61.71 m | Christina Obergfoll | Germany | 21 July 2015 | |
