= Jaida Ross =

American track and field athlete (born 2001)

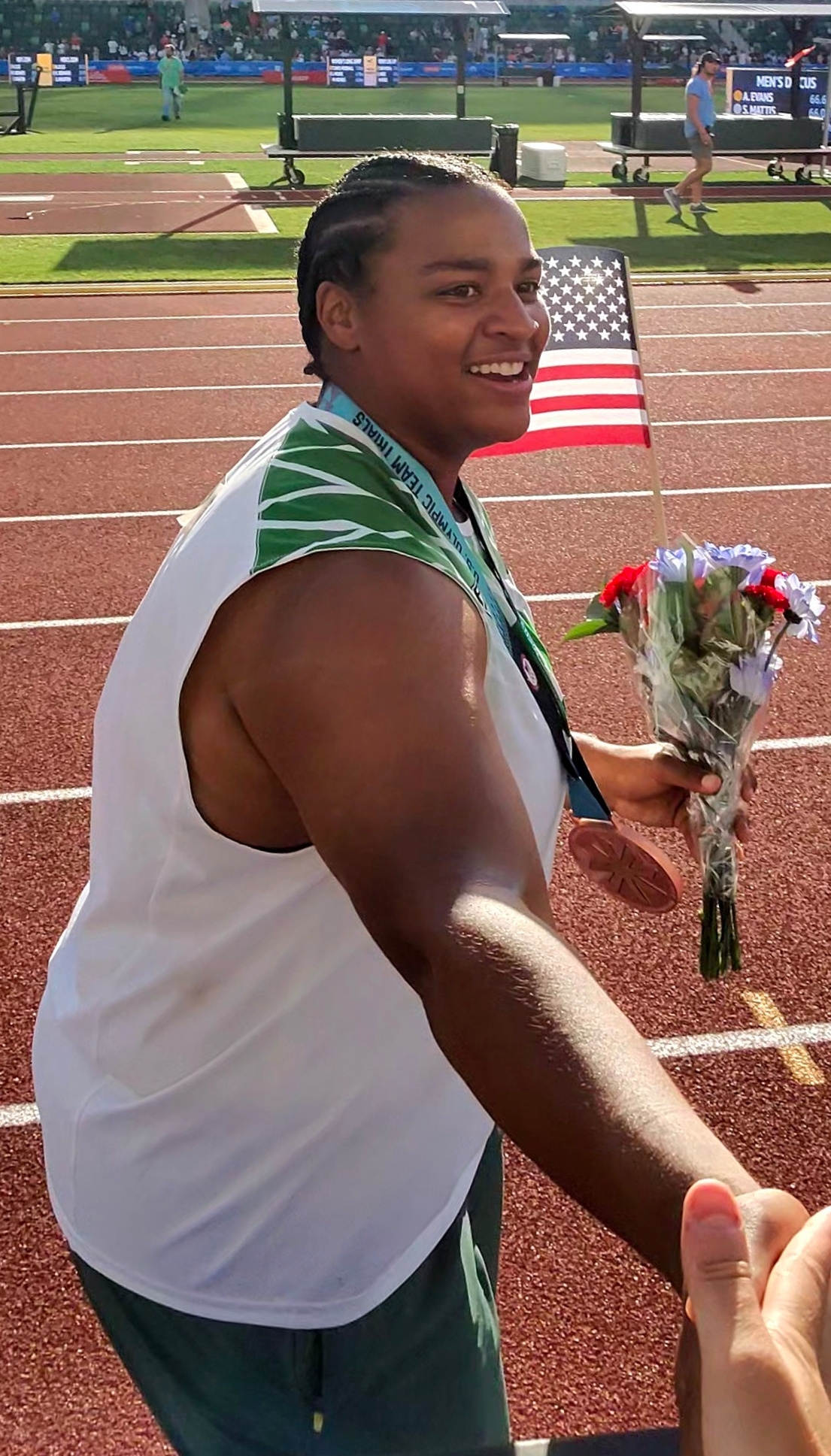
- Ross in 2024

Personal information
- Born: October 29, 2001 (age 24) Medford, Oregon, U.S.
- Education: University of Oregon (BA, MEd)
- Height: 5 ft 7 in (170 cm)

Sport
- Country: United States
- Sport: Athletics (track and field)
- Events: Shot put; Discus
- University team: Oregon Ducks
- Turned pro: April 2025
- Coached by: Brian Blutreich (2022–present)

Achievements and titles
- Highest world ranking: 6th (shot put, 2025); 66th (discus, 2024)
- Personal bests: Shot put: 20.13 m (66 ft 1/2 in) (Eugene, 2025); Discus: 59.74 m (195 ft 11 3/4 in) (Boulder, 2024)
Medal record
Women's athletics
Representing United States
NACAC U23 Championships
Gold medal – first place	2023 San Jose	Shot put

Jaida Ross (/ˈdʒeɪdə/ JAY-də; born October 29, 2001) is an American track and field athlete who competes in shot put and discus throw. She represented the United States at the 2024 Summer Olympics in Paris, where she placed fourth in women's shot put, and was the 2024 NCAA Division I champion in the event. Ross was the first collegiate woman to break 20 m (65 ft 7 1/4 in) in shot put.

== Early life and education ==
Ross was born on October 29, 2001, in Medford, Oregon, to mother Amanda Krug, a mental health professional. She has a twin sister named Jazzlyn.

Ross graduated from North Medford High School in 2020, where she was one of the top throwers in the country. She attended the University of Oregon, earning a bachelor's degree in psychology in 2024 and a master's degree in prevention science in 2025, while also competing in shot put and discus for the Oregon Ducks. She hopes to follow in her mother's steps to work in a helping profession in the future.

== Career ==
=== 2020–2025: Collegiate career & Paris Olympics ===
Despite the cancelation of her senior season at North Medford High School due to the COVID-19 pandemic in 2020, Ross embarked on her collegiate career at the University of Oregon, competing in shot put and discus for the Oregon Ducks starting in the 2021 season.

In 2022, Ross placed fifth in shot put at the NCAA Division I Outdoor Championships with a throw of 17.83 m (58 ft 5 3/4 in) and 9th in discus with a throw of 53.84 m (176 ft 7 1/2 in).

In July 2023, she beat Jalani Davis to win gold in shot put at the 2023 U23 NACAC Championship with a throw of 18.35 m (60 ft 2 1/4 in).

In April 2024, Ross set a new NCAA record in the women's shot put at the Triton Invitational in La Jolla, California, with a throw of 19.71 m (64 ft 7 3/4 in), breaking the record set by Adelaide Aquilla in 2022. The next month, in May 2024, Ross broke her own NCAA shot put record at the 2024 NCAA Division I West First Rounds, with a throw of 20.01 m (65 ft 7 3/4 in). In doing so, she became the first collegiate woman to pass the 20-meter mark in shot put, and just the seventh woman in American history.

Ross was the 2024 NCAA Division I outdoor champion in shot put, with a throw of 19.57 m (64 ft 2 1/4 in), and placed second at the indoor championships, with a throw of 18.47 m (60 ft 7 in).

Ross came in third at U.S. Olympic Trials with a throw of 19.60 m (64 ft 3 1/2 in), qualifying her for the 2024 Summer Olympics in Paris, alongside teammates Chase Jackson and Raven Saunders. At the Olympics, she placed fourth in shot put with a throw of 19.28 m (63 ft 3 in).

In her final NCAA competition, Ross placed second at the 2025 Division I Indoor Championships with a throw of 18.98 m (62 ft 3 in), a personal best; Oregon was also the team champion.

=== 2025–present: Professional career ===
Ross turned pro in April 2025, announcing that month that she had signed with Nike. She participated in her first Diamond League events that year, taking part in the Xiamen, Shanghai, and Zürich events, and placing third with a personal best of 20.13 m (66 ft 1/2 in) at the 2025 Prefontaine Classic in Eugene, Oregon.

Ross placed fourth at the 2025 USA Outdoor Track and Field Championships, which earned her a trip to the 2025 World Athletics Championships; USA teammate Chase Jackson placed first, but received a wildcard entry as the reigning world champion, freeing up a spot for Ross in the competition. Ross placed eighth in shot put with a throw of 19.01 m (62 ft 4 1/4 in) at the 2025 World Championships in Tokyo, Japan.

== Personal life ==
Growing up, Ross looked up to Olympic gold medal shot putter Michelle Carter, saying, "I love what she does for the throws world, I love what she does for the Black community." Ross competed alongside Carter at the 2022 USA Outdoor Track and Field Championships, Ross' first championships and Carter's last before retiring from competition.

== Competition history ==
All results are from World Athletics.

=== International competitions ===
Representing the United States
Year	Competition	Venue	Position	Event	Result	Notes
2023	NACAC U23 Championships	San Jose, Costa Rica	1st	Shot put	18.35 m (60 ft 2 1/4 in)	—N/a
2024	Olympic Games	Paris, France	4th	Shot put	19.28 m (63 ft 3 in)	—N/a
2025	World Championships	Tokyo, Japan	8th	Shot put	19.01 m (62 ft 4 1/4 in)	—N/a

=== National competitions ===
Year	Competition	Venue	Position	Event	Result	Notes
2022	USA Championships	Eugene, Oregon	11th	Shot put	17.31 m (56 ft 9 1/4 in)	—N/a
2023	USA Championships	Eugene, Oregon	6th	Shot put	17.82 m (58 ft 5 1/2 in)	—N/a
2024	United States Olympic Trials	Eugene, Oregon	3rd	Shot put	19.60 m (64 ft 3 1/2 in)	—N/a
2025	USA Championships	Eugene, Oregon	4th	Shot put	19.33 m (63 ft 5 in)	—N/a

=== NCAA competitions ===
Representing Oregon Ducks and University of Oregon
Year	Competition	Venue	Position	Event	Result	Notes
2022	Division I Championships	Eugene, Oregon	5th	Shot put	17.83 m (58 ft 5 3/4 in)	SB
2022	Division I Championships	Eugene, Oregon	9th	Discus	53.84 m (176 ft 7 1/2 in)	—N/a
2023	Division I Indoor Championships	Albuquerque, New Mexico	8th	Shot put	17.56 m (57 ft 7 1/4 in)	—N/a
2023	Division I Championships	Austin, Texas	5th	Shot put	18.11 m (59 ft 4 3/4 in)	—N/a
2024	Division I Indoor Championships	Boston, Massachusetts	2nd	Shot put	18.47 m (60 ft 7 in)	—N/a
2024	Division I Championships	Eugene, Oregon	1st	Shot put	19.57 m (64 ft 2 1/4 in)	—N/a
2024	Division I Championships	Eugene, Oregon	14th	Discus	54.99 m (180 ft 4 3/4 in)	—N/a
2025	Division I Indoor Championships	Virginia Beach, Virginia	2nd	Shot put	18.98 m (62 ft 3 in)	PB
