= Justin Stafford =

American hammer thrower (born 1996)

Personal information
- Born: 24 May 1996 (age 30)

Sport
- Sport: Athletics
- Event: Hammer throw

Achievements and titles
- Personal best(s): Hammer:: 77.07 m (Eugene, 2024)

Justin Stafford (born 24 May 1996) is an American hammer thrower.

== Career ==
Stafford finished first among freshmen in the hammer throw and discus at the Mt. SAC Relays in 2015 suffered a spine fracture that jeopardised his ability to compete again after an accident whilst conducting a routine weights routine at Saddleback College which initial prognosis suggesting his career was over. However, he returned to action the following year. He transferred to University of California, Los Angeles in 2016 and in 2018 recorded a new personal best of 64.67 meters and qualified for his first NCAA Championships that year. He also competed in the discus throw at UCLA.

He threw a personal best 73.07 metres to place eighth at the 2022 USA Outdoor Track and Field Championships. The following year, he threw 72.86 metres to place sixth at the 2023 USATF Championships in Eugene, Oregon in July 2023.

He increased his personal best past 75 metres for the first time with a throw of 75.90 metres to win at the Iron Wood Classic in Rathdrum, Idaho on 1 June 2024. He placed third in the 2024 US Olympic Trials with a new personal best throw of 77.07 metres in Eugene, Oregon to finish behind Rudy Winkler and Daniel Haugh, however was outside the ranking quota and was not selected for the 2024 Olympic Games with the United States only sending two athletes.

Competing prior to the 2025 US nationals he threw with consistency, achieving his fourth to eleventh best career marks across eight separate competitions, improving his position inside the world rankings quota spots. He placed seventh with a throw of 76.33 metres at the 2025 2025 USA Track and Field Championships.

== Personal life ==
He is from California. His sister Jillian Stafford also competed in the hammer throw at UCLA. After graduation he later became based in Manhattan, Kansas.
