= 2023 USA Outdoor Track and Field Championships =

- Dates: July 6–9, 2023
- Host city: Eugene, Oregon, United States
- Venue: Hayward Field
- Level: Senior, Junior
- Type: Outdoor
- Events: 40 (men: 20; women: 20)

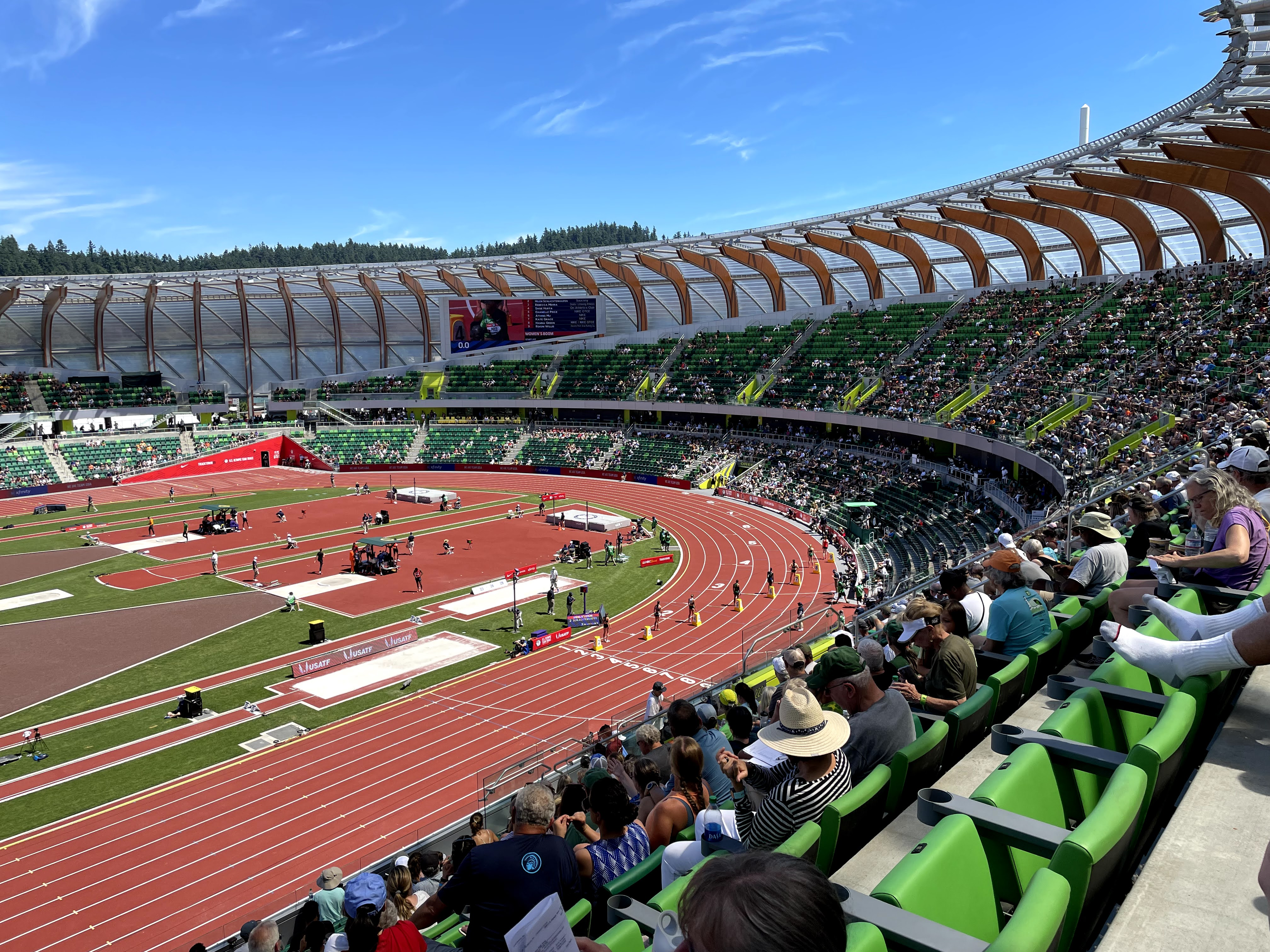
2023 USA Outdoor Track and Field Championships were held in the Hayward field

The 2023 USA Outdoor Track and Field Championships were held at Hayward Field in Eugene, Oregon from July 6–9, 2023. They served as USA Track & Field's (USATF) national championships in track and field for the United States.

The results of the event determined qualification for the 2023 World Athletics Championships, held in Budapest, and the 2023 Pan American Games, held in Santiago, Chile. Provided they achieved the World standard or are in the World Athletics ranking quota, the top two athletes in each event will gain a place on the Team USA World team. In the event that a leading athlete does not hold the standard, or an athlete withdraws, the next-highest-finishing athlete with the standard will be selected instead. USATF is expected to announce their World Championship roster based on these guidelines in July 2023.

There was no marathon competition, but USATF announced the marathon teams via press release.

The 2023 USATF Junior Championships were also held at Hayward Field in Eugene from July 7–9, 2023. The results of the event determined qualification for the 2023 Pan American U20 Athletics Championships and 2023 NACAC U18 and U23 Championships in Athletics.

== Men's results ==
=== Men track events ===
Event	Gold		Silver		Bronze	
100 meters (Wind: +0.1 m/s)	Cravont Charleston	9.95	Christian Coleman	9.96	Noah Lyles	10.00
200 meters (Wind: -0.1 m/s)	Erriyon Knighton	19.72	Kenny Bednarek	19.82	Courtney Lindsey	19.85
400 meters	Bryce Deadmon	44.21	Vernon Norwood	44.38	Quincy Hall	44.41
800 meters	Bryce Hoppel	1:46.20	Isaiah Harris	1:46.68	Clayton Murphy	1:46.82
1500 meters	Yared Nuguse	3:34.90	Joe Waskom	3:35.32	Cole Hocker	3:35.46
5000 meters	Abdihamid Nur	13:24.37	Paul Chelimo	13:24.90	Sean McGorty	13:25.98
10,000 meters	Woody Kincaid	28:23.01	Joe Klecker	28:24.50	Sean McGorty	28:24.96
Marathon	Zach Panning	2:09:28	Elkanah Kibet	2:09:07	Nico Montanez	2:09:55
110 meters hurdles (Wind: -0.2 m/s)	Daniel Roberts	13.05	Cordell Tinch	13.08	Freddie Crittenden	13.23
400 meters hurdles	Rai Benjamin	46.62 CR	CJ Allen	48.18	Trevor Bassitt	48.26
3000 meters steeplechase	Kenneth Rooks	8:16.78	Benard Keter	8:17.19	Isaac Updike	8:17.69
20 km walk	Nick Christie	1:25:30.31	Emmanuel Corvera	1:31:31.53	Samuel Allen	1:31:58.72
35 km walk	Nick Christie	2:44:16	Dan Nehnevaj	2:47:48	John Cody Risch	2:50:06

=== Men field events ===
Event	Gold		Silver		Bronze	
High jump	JuVaughn Harrison	2.26 m (7 ft 4 3/4 in)	Shelby McEwen	2.26 m (7 ft 4 3/4 in)	Vernon Turner	2.21 m (7 ft 3 in)
Pole vault	Chris Nilsen	5.91 m (19 ft 4 1/2 in)	Zach McWhorter	5.86 m (19 ft 2 1/2 in)	Zach Bradford	5.86 m (19 ft 2 1/2 in)
Long jump	Marquis Dendy	8.14 m (26 ft 8 1/4 in) (Wind: -0.1 m/s)	Jarrion Lawson	8.13 m (26 ft 8 in) (Wind: +1.1 m/s)	JuVaughn Harrison	8.08 m (26 ft 6 in)w (Wind: +2.2 m/s)
Triple jump	Donald Scott	17.22 m (56 ft 5 3/4 in) (Wind: -0.5 m/s)	Will Claye	16.98 m (55 ft 8 1/2 in) (Wind: +0.1 m/s)	Chris Benard	16.68 m (54 ft 8 1/2 in) (Wind: +0.2 m/s)
Shot put	Ryan Crouser	22.86 m (75 ft 0 in)	Josh Awotunde	22.10 m (72 ft 6 in)	Payton Otterdahl	22.09 m (72 ft 5 1/2 in)
Discus throw	Sam Mattis	65.93 m (216 ft 3 in)	Turner Washington	65.60 m (215 ft 2 in)	Brian Williams	63.36 m (207 ft 10 in)
Hammer throw	Rudy Winkler	79.04 m (259 ft 3 in)	Daniel Haugh	77.24 m (253 ft 4 in)	Alex Young	75.87 m (248 ft 11 in)
Javelin throw	Curtis Thompson	80.92 m (265 ft 5 in)	Capers Williamson	78.91 m (258 ft 10 in)	Marc Anthony Minichello	78.07 m (256 ft 1 in)
Decathlon	Harrison Williams	8630	Zach Ziemek	8508	Austin West	8331

== Women's results ==
Key:

=== Women track events ===
Event	Gold		Silver		Bronze	
100 meters (Wind: +0.7 m/s)	Sha'Carri Richardson	10.82	Brittany Brown	10.90	Tamari Davis	10.99
200 meters (Wind: +0.0 m/s)	Gabby Thomas	21.60	Sha'Carri Richardson	21.94	Kayla White	22.01
400 meters	Sydney McLaughlin-Levrone	48.74 CR	Britton Wilson	49.79	Talitha Diggs	49.93
800 meters	Nia Akins	1:59.50	Raevyn Rogers	1:59.83	Kaela Edwards	2:00.52
1500 meters	Nikki Hiltz	4:03.10	Athing Mu	4:03.44	Cory McGee	4:03.48
5000 meters	Elise Cranny	14:52.66	Alicia Monson	14:55.10	Natosha Rogers	14:55.39
10,000 meters	Elise Cranny	32:12.30	Alicia Monson	32:17.51	Natosha Rogers	32:22.77
Marathon	Keira D'Amato	2:19:12	Susanna Sullivan	2:24:27	Lindsay Flanagan	2:24:43
100 meters hurdles (Wind: +0.4 m/s)	Nia Ali	12.37	Keni Harrison	12.42	Masai Russell	12.46
400 meters hurdles	Shamier Little	53.34	Dalilah Muhammad	53.53	Anna Cockrell	54.24
3000 meters steeplechase	Krissy Gear	9:12.81	Emma Coburn	9:13.60	Courtney Wayment	9:14.63
20 km walk	Maria Michta-Coffey	1:38:37.44	Stephanie Casey	1:40:48.72	Miranda Melville	1:40:48.98
35 km walk	Miranda Melville	2:57:22	Maria Michta-Coffey	2:58:39	Stephanie Casey	3:00:05

=== Women field events ===
Event	Gold		Silver		Bronze	
High jump	Vashti Cunningham	1.91 m (6 ft 3 in)	Rylee Anderson Jenna Rogers	1.86 m (6 ft 1 in)	Not awarded	
Pole vault	Katie Moon	4.90 m (16 ft 3/4 in)	Sandi Morris	4.61 m (15 ft 1 1/4 in)	Hana Moll	4.61 m (15 ft 1 1/4 in)
Long jump	Tara Davis-Woodhall	6.87 m (22 ft 6 1/4 in) (Wind: -0.7 m/s)	Quanesha Burks	6.82 m (22 ft 4 1/2 in) (Wind: +0.3 m/s)	Jasmine Moore	6.74 m (22 ft 1 1/4 in) (Wind: -0.2 m/s)
Triple jump	Tori Franklin	14.44 m (47 ft 4 1/2 in) (Wind: 0.2 m/s)	Keturah Orji	14.43 m (47 ft 4 in) (Wind: 1.4 m/s)	Jasmine Moore	14.19 m (46 ft 6 1/2 in) (Wind: -0.9 m/s)
Shot put	Maggie Ewen	19.92 m (65 ft 4 1/4 in)	Adelaide Aquilla	19.02 m (62 ft 4 3/4 in)	Jalani Davis	18.62 m (61 ft 1 in)
Discus throw	Valarie Allman	66.67 m (218 ft 8 in)	Laulauga Tausaga	65.46 m (214 ft 9 in)	Elena Bruckner	58.33 m (191 ft 4 in)
Hammer throw	Brooke Andersen	78.65 m (258 ft 0 in)	DeAnna Price	78.18 m (256 ft 5 in)	Janee' Kassanavoid	76.44 m (250 ft 9 in)
Javelin throw	Maddie Harris	60.73 m (199 ft 2 in)	Maggie Malone	58.79 m (192 ft 10 in)	Madison Wiltrout	55.51 m (182 ft 1 in)
Heptathlon	Anna Hall	6677	Taliyah Brooks	6319	Chari Hawkins	6053

== Schedule ==
Track Events
Day 1—July 6, 2023
Time (PDT)	Event	Division	Round
2:52 p.m.	800m	Men	First Round
3:18 p.m.	800m	Women	First Round
4:04 p.m.	100m	Women	First Round
4:30 p.m.	100m	Men	First Round
4:56 p.m.	400m	Women	First Round
5:23 p.m.	400m	Men	First Round
6:04 p.m.	3000m Steeplechase	Women	First Round
6:35 p.m.	3000m Steeplechase	Men	First Round
7:05 p.m.	1500m	Men	First Round
7:26 p.m.	1500m	Women	First Round
7:45 p.m.	10000m	Women	Final
8:30 p.m.	10000m	Men	Final
Day 2—July 7, 2023
Time	Event	Division	Round
4:27 p.m.	100m Hurdles	Women	First Round
5:09 p.m.	100m	Women	Semi-Final
5:39 p.m.	400m	Women	Semi-Final
5:55 p.m.	400m	Men	Semi-Final
6:10 p.m.	800m	Men	First Round
6:25 p.m.	800m	Women	First Round
6:53 p.m.	100m	Women	Final
7:02 p.m.	100m	Men	Final
7:11 p.m.	400m Hurdles	Men	First Round
7:37 p.m.	400m Hurdles	Women	First Round
Day 3—July 8, 2023
Time	Event	Division	Round
6:30 a.m.	20km Race Walk	Women	Final
6:31 a.m.	20km Race Walk	Men	Final
4:43 p.m.	200m	Men	First Round
5:09 p.m.	200m	Women	First Round
5:57 p.m.	110m Hurdles	Men	First Round
6:03 p.m.	100m Hurdles	Women	Semi-Final
6:19 p.m.	400m	Women	Final
6:26 p.m.	400m	Men	Final
6:34 p.m.	400m Hurdles	Women	Semi-Final
6:49 p.m.	400m Hurdles	Men	Semi-Final
7:04 p.m.	1500m	Women	Final
7:15 p.m.	1500m	Men	Final
7:25 p.m.	3000m Steeplechase	Women	Final
7:40 p.m.	3000m Steeplechase	Men	Final
7:55 p.m.	100m Hurdles	Women	Final
Day 4—July 9, 2023
Time	Event	Division	Round
5:30 p.m.	200m	Men	Semi-Final
5:45 p.m.	200m	Women	Semi-Final
6:04 p.m.	110m Hurdles	Men	Semi-Final
6:19 p.m.	800m	Women	Final
6:27 p.m.	800m	Men	Final
6:35 p.m.	400m Hurdles	Women	Final
6:43 p.m.	400m Hurdles	Men	Final
6:52 p.m.	5000m	Men	Final
7:12 p.m.	200m	Women	Final
7:20 p.m.	200m	Men	Final
7:29 p.m.	5000m	Women	Final
7:53 p.m.	110m Hurdles	Men	Final

Field Events
Day 1—July 6, 2023
Time	Event	Division	Round
3:30 p.m.	Discus Throw	Men	Final
6:00 p.m.	Triple Jump	Women	Final
6:30 p.m.	Javelin Throw	Women	Final
Day 2—July 7, 2023
Time	Event	Division	Round
5:40 p.m.	High Jump	Women	Final
6:00 p.m.	Triple Jump	Men	Final
Day 3—July 8, 2023
Time	Event	Division	Round
5:00 p.m.	Pole Vault	Men	Final
5:30 a.m.	Hammer Throw	Men	Final
5:40 p.m.	Long Jump	Men	Final
5:45 p.m.	Shot Put	Women	Final
5:50 p.m.	Javelin Throw	Men	Final
Day 4—July 9, 2023
Time	Event	Division	Round
4:00 p.m.	Hammer Throw	Women	Final
5:00 p.m.	Pole Vault	Women	Final
5:05 p.m.	High Jump	Men	Final
5:40 p.m.	Long Jump	Women	Final
6:10 p.m.	Discus Throw	Women	Final
6:15 p.m.	Shot Put	Men	Final

Heptathlon
Day 1—July 6, 2023
Time	Event	Division	Round
11:25 a.m.	100m Hurdles	Women	Heptathlon Final
12:40 p.m.	High Jump	Women	Heptathlon Final
2:40 p.m.	Shot Put	Women	Heptathlon Final
3:48 p.m.	200m	Women	Heptathlon Final
Day 2—July 7, 2023
Time	Event	Division	Round
11:00 a.m.	100m Hurdles	Women	Heptathlon Final
1:45 p.m.	Long Jump	Women	Heptathlon Final
4:53 p.m.	800m	Women	Heptathlon Final

Decathlon
Day 1—July 6, 2023
Time	Event	Division	Round
11:45 a.m.	100m	Men	Decathlon Final
12:40 p.m.	Long Jump	Men	Decathlon Final
1:50 p.m.	Shot Put	Men	Decathlon Final
3:15 p.m.	High Jump	Men	Decathlon Final
5:48 p.m.	400m	Men	Decathlon Final
Day 2—July 7, 2023
Time	Event	Division	Round
11:45 a.m.	110m Hurdles	Men	Decathlon Final
12:30 p.m.	Discus Throw	Men	Decathlon Final
2:30 p.m.	Pole Vault	Men	Decathlon Final
4:57 p.m.	Javelin Throw	Men	Decathlon Final
6:40 p.m.	1500m	Men	Decathlon Final

== Automatic selections ==
The following are eligible for automatic selection by Team USA to 2023 World Athletics Championships.

2022 World Athletics Championships Champions

- 100 metres Fred Kerley
- 200 metres Noah Lyles
- 400 metres Michael Norman
- 110 metres hurdles Grant Holloway
- Shot put Ryan Crouser
- 800 metres Athing Mu
- 400 metres hurdles Sydney McLaughlin-Levrone
- Pole vault Katie Nageotte
- Shot put Chase Ealey
- Hammer throw Brooke Andersen

2022 Diamond League Champions

- Shot put Ryan Crouser
- 100 meters Trayvon Bromell
- 200 meters Noah Lyles
- 110 metres hurdles Grant Holloway
- Shot put Chase Ealey
- Discus throw Valarie Allman
- Javelin throw Kara Winger

== 2023 USA Qualification Standards ==
All qualifying performances for the Championships must be attained during the following time periods:

- 10,000 meters, 20 km Race Walk, & Combined Events: Monday, January 31, 2022 – Sunday, June 25, 2023
- All other events: Thursday, June 23, 2022 – Sunday, June 25, 2023

Event	Men's standard	Women's standard	Max entrants	Rounds
100 m	10.05	11.08	32	3
200 m	20.24	22.60	32	3
400 m	45.20	51.00	32	3
800 m	1:46.25	1:59.80	32	3
1500 m	3:37.00	4:05.00	36	2
5000 m	13:20.00	15:09.59	24	1
10,000 m	27:50.00	31:32.00	24	1
20,000 m race walk	1:36:00; 10 km RW 46:30; 5 km RW 22:00	1:48:00; 10 km RW 51:30; 5k RW 24:30	15	1
110/100 m hurdles	13.50	12.78	32	3
400 m hurdles	49.50	56.00	32	3
3000 m steeplechase	8:29.00	9:35.00	26	2
High jump	2.27 m (7 ft 5 1/4 in)	1.87 m (6 ft 1 1/2 in)	16	1
Pole vault	5.80 m (19 ft 1/4 in)	4.60 m (15 ft 1 in)	16	1
Long jump	8.12 m (26 ft 7 1/2 in)	6.65 m (21 ft 9 3/4 in)	16	1
Triple jump	16.30 m (53 ft 5 1/2 in)	13.50 m (44 ft 3 1/4 in)	16	1
Shot put	20.80 m (68 ft 2 3/4 in)	18.00 m (59 ft 1/2 in)	16	1
Discus throw	62.00 m (203 ft 4 3/4 in)	58.50 m (191 ft 11 in)	16	1
Hammer throw	72.50 m (237 ft 10 1/4 in)	71.00 m (232 ft 11 1/4 in)	16	1
Javelin throw	76.00 m (249 ft 4 in)	55.50 m (182 ft 1 in)	16	1
Decathlon/Heptathlon	7900 pts	6000 pts	16	1

== Results ==
- 2023 Toyota USATF Championships - 7/6/2023 to 7/9/2023 and USATF U20 Championships Hayward Field Results
