= Maddie Harris =

American javelin thrower (born 2000)

Personal information
- Born: Madelyn Harris; 2 November 2000 (age 25)

Sport
- Sport: Athletics
- Event: Javelin throw

Achievements and titles
- Personal bests: Javelin: 60.73 m (Eugene, 2023)
Medal record
Women's athletics
Representing United States
Pan American Games
Bronze medal – third place	2023 Santiago	Javelin throw

Maddie Harris (born 2 November 2000) is an American javelin thrower. She was American national champion in 2023 and a bronze medalist at the 2023 Pan American Games.

== Early life ==
From Missouri, she attended Lee's Summit West High School. As well as track and field, she competed in Softball in high school.

== Career ==
Harris won the javelin throw at the 2023 USA Outdoor Track and Field Championships in July 2023 in Eugene, Oregon, with a personal best throw of 60.73 metres. Later that year, she won the bronze medal at the 2023 Pan American Games in Santiago de Chile with a distance of 60.06 m, behind Colombian Flor Ruiz and Rhema Otabor of the Bahamas.

Competing for the University of Nebraska–Lincoln, she won the Big Ten Championships in Eugene in May 2025 with a throw of 58.38 metres. The following month, she finished in fifth place at the 2025 NCAA Outdoor Championships in Eugene, with a throw of 58.36 metres. She then also placed fifth overall in the javelin throw at the 2025 USA Outdoor Track and Field Championships in Eugene with a throw of 55.17 metres.

On 28 March 2026, she placed second behind Madison Wiltrout in the javelin throw at the USATF Winter Long Throws National Championship in Arizona with a throw of 55.74 metres. On 23 July 2026, competing in the women's javelin at the 2026 USA Outdoor Track and Field Championships in New York, she finished third overall behind eventual winner Madison Wiltrout and defending champion Evelyn Bliss.
