= Kelsey Daniel =

Tobagonian athlete (born 2003)

Personal information
- Born: 7 April 2003 (age 23)

Sport
- Sport: Athletics
- Event: Long jump

Achievements and titles
- Personal bests: Long jump: 8.16m (Virginia Beach, 2025); Triple jump: 16.50m (Fayetteville, 2026)
Medal record
Men's athletics
Representing Trinidad and Tobago
Junior Pan American Games
Silver medal – second place	2021 Cali-Valle	Long jump
NACAC U23 Championships
Bronze medal – third place	2023 San Jose	Triple jump

Kelsey Daniel (born 7 April 2003) is a long jumper from Trinidad and Tobago. He won the 2025 NCAA Indoor Championships.

== Early life ==
He was brought up in Parlatuvier, Tobago and started long jump when he was ten years-old. He later also tried triple jump, but returned to the long jump. His cousin Tyriq Horsford is also a track and field athlete who competes internationally.

== Career ==
He set a personal best with a 7.39m jump at the NAAATT Track and Field Series in April 2021. He won the silver medal in the long jump at the 2021 Junior Pan American Games, with a jump of 7.90 metres. His cousin Tyriq Horsford won silver on the same day in the javelin. He won the bronze medal in the triple jump behind Americans Russell Robinson and Salif Mane at the 2023 NACAC U23 Championships in Costa Rica.

He set a Trinidad and Tobago national indoor record of 7.99 metres for the long jump in 2023. In January 2025, at the Arkansas Invitational men’s long jump he set a new record of 8.03 metres to break his own T&T indoor record.

Competing for the University of Texas at Austin, he won the NCAA Championship indoor long jump title on 14 March 2025 in Virginia Beach. His jump of 8.16 metres was a facility record and he became the first male member of the Texas Longhorns to win an NCAA long jump title.

Daniel jumped 8.14 metres at the Tyson Invitational in Fayetteville, Arkansas on 13 February 2026, before setting a new personal best of 16.50 metres in the triple jump at the same meeting. That month, he jumped 8.21 metres at the SEC Championship. In June, he placed seventh in the triple jump at the 2026 NCAA Outdoor Championships with 16.44 metres. In July, Daniel finished seventh in the men’s long jump final at the 2026 Commonwealth Games in Glasgow with a jump of 7.90 metres.
