= Kaila Jackson =

American athlete (born 2004)

Personal information
- Nationality: United States
- Born: 30 June 2004 (age 22)

Sport
- Sport: Athletics
- Event: Sprint
- College team: Georgia Bulldogs

Achievements and titles
- Personal bests: 60 m: 7.07 s (Albuquerque, 2023) WU20R; 100 m: 10.93 s (Lexington, 2026); 200 m: 22.28 s (Lexington, 2024)
Medal record
Women's athletics
Representing United States
NACAC U23 Championships
Gold medal – first place	2023 San Jose	4 × 100 m
Pan American U20 Championships
Gold medal – first place	2023 Mayagüez	4 × 100 m
Silver medal – second place	2023 Mayagüez	100 m

Kaila Jackson (born 30 June 2004) is an American track and field athlete who competes as a sprinter. In February 2023, she set a new U20 60 metres world record.

== Early life ==
From Redford, Michigan, Jackson attended Renaissance High School and was named the 2021-22 Gatorade Michigan Girls Track & Field Player of the Year. She then joined the University of Georgia.

== Career ==
Competing as a freshman, Jackson finished runner-up in the 60 m at the 2023 NCAA Division I Indoor Track and Field Championships in Albuquerque in February 2023. She finished fourth in the 200 m at the same event. She set a new Women’s world U20 indoor 60 m record when she ran 7.07 seconds in Albuquerque, on 10 March 2023. Later that year she finished fourth in the 100 m at the 2023 NCAA Division I Outdoor Track and Field Championships held in Austin, Texas in June 2023. In July 2023, she won gold in the NACAC U23 Championships in the 4 × 100 metres relay. In August 2023, she competed at the 2023 Pan American U20 Athletics Championships and was part of the American 4 × 100 m relay team that won gold in a new American U20 national record time. She also finished second in the individual 100 metres race.

In March 2024, Jackson finished runner-up in the 60 m at the 2024 NCAA Division I Indoor Track and Field Championships in Boston, Massachusetts in a time of 7.08 seconds. On the same day, she finished fourth in the 200 metres in a time of 22.63 seconds. She ran 10.95 seconds for the 100 metres at the SEC Championship in Gainesville, Florida on 11 May 2024.

She reached the semi-finals of the 100 metres at the 2025 USA Outdoor Track and Field Championships, running her heat in 11.16 seconds (+1.3 m/s).

In May 2026, Jackson ran a personal best for the 100 metres of 10.93 seconds to qualify from the NCAA Regionals for the 2026 NCAA Outdoor Championships. On 24 July, she was a finalist at the 2026 USA Outdoor Track and Field Championships over 100 metres, placing seventh overall.

== Athletics achievements ==
Information from her World Athletics profile unless otherwise noted.

=== Personal bests ===
Type	Distance	Time (s)	Wind (m/s)	Venue	Date	Notes
Individual events
Indoor	60 metres	7.07	—N/a	Albuquerque, United States	10 March 2023	=WU20R
Indoor	60 metres	7.07	—N/a	Boston, United States	8 March 2024	=WU20R
Indoor	200 metres sh	22.55	—N/a	Boston, United States	8 March 2024	
Outdoor	100 metres	10.93	+1.3	Lexington, United States	30 May 2026	
Outdoor	200 metres	22.28	+0.1	Lexington, United States	23 May 2024	
Team events
Outdoor	4 × 100 metres relay	41.89	—N/a	Eugene, United States	13 June 2026	

=== International competitions ===
Representing the United States
Year	Competition	Venue	Position	Event	Time	Notes
2023	NACAC U23 Championships	San José, Costa Rica	1st	4 × 100 m relay	42.74	CR
2023	Pan American U20 Championships	Mayagüez, Puerto Rico	2nd	100 m	11.41	
2023	Pan American U20 Championships	Mayagüez, Puerto Rico	1st	4 × 100 m relay	42.88	CR

=== National championships and competitions ===
Year	Competition	Venue	Position	Event	Time	Notes
2022	USA U20 Championships	Eugene, Oregon	7th	100 m	11.37	
2022	USA U20 Championships	Eugene, Oregon	5th	200 m	23.54	
2023	NCAA Division I Indoor Championships	Albuquerque, New Mexico	2nd	60 m	7.08	
2023	NCAA Division I Indoor Championships	Albuquerque, New Mexico	8th	200 m sh	22.84	
2023	NCAA Division I Championships	Austin, Texas	4th	100 m	10.96	
2023	NCAA Division I Championships	Austin, Texas	12th (sf)	200 m	22.78	
2023	NCAA Division I Championships	Austin, Texas	6th	4 × 100 m relay	42.87	
2023	USA U20 Championships	Eugene, Oregon	1st	100 m	11.15	
2024	NCAA Division I Indoor Championships	Boston, Massachusetts	2nd	60 m	7.08	
2024	NCAA Division I Indoor Championships	Boston, Massachusetts	4th	200 m	22.63	
2024	NCAA Division I Championships	Eugene, Oregon	5th	100 m	11.00	
2024	NCAA Division I Championships	Eugene, Oregon	6th	200 m	22.68	
2025	NCAA Division I Indoor Championships	Virginia Beach, Virginia	3rd	60 m	7.15	
2025	NCAA Division I Indoor Championships	Virginia Beach, Virginia	7th	200 m	22.96	
2025	NCAA Division I Championships	Eugene, Oregon	12th (sf)	100 m	11.15	
2025	USA Championsips	Eugene, Oregon	11th (sf)	100 m	11.21	
2025	USA Championsips	Eugene, Oregon	20th (sf)	200 m	23.10	
2026	NCAA Division I Indoor Championships	Fayetteville, Arkansas	6th	60 m	7.22	
2026	NCAA Division I Championships	Eugene, Oregon	12th (sf)	100 m	11.13	
2026	NCAA Division I Championships	Eugene, Oregon	10th (sf)	200 m	22.64	
2026	NCAA Division I Championships	Eugene, Oregon	3rd	4 × 100 m relay	41.89	SB
2026	USA Championships	New York, New York	7th	100 m	11.11	
2026	USA Championships	New York, New York	6th	200 m	22.87	
