= 2024 United States Olympic trials (track and field) =

2024 United States Olympic track and field trials
- Dates: June 21–30, 2024
- Host city: Eugene, Oregon
- Venue: Hayward Field
- Level: Senior
- Type: Outdoor
- Events: 44 (men: 22; women: 22)

The 2024 United States Olympic trials for track and field were held at Hayward Field in Eugene, Oregon. Organized by USA Track and Field, the ten-day competition lasted from June 21 to 30 and served as the national championships in track and field for the United States. 44 events were held, 22 for men and 22 for women.

The marathon trials were held on February 3, 2024, in Orlando, Florida. During the 2024 Paris Olympic Games, track and field events will be held between Thursday, August 1 and Sunday, August 11 with competition beginning each day at 4 am. ET.

The results of the event determined qualification for the American Olympic team at the 2024 Summer Olympics, to be held in Paris. Provided they had achieved the Olympic standard or are in the World Athletics ranking quota, the top three athletes in each event gained a place on the Olympic team.

In the event that a leading athlete did not hold the standard, or an athlete withdrew, the next highest finishing athlete with the standard was selected instead. USA Track and Field announced their Olympic roster based on United States Olympic & Paralympic Committee and Team USA guidelines.

The August 26–31 2024 World Athletics U20 Championships in Lima, Peru will be selected from Team USA earned at the 2024 USATF U20 Outdoor Championships on June 12-13, 2024.

On July 9, 2024, USA Track and Field selected the 120 athletes that would compete the U.S. Olympic Team.

== Men's results ==
Key:
≠ Athlete without Olympic qualifying standard, not selected
Athlete without Olympic qualifying standard, invited to Olympics based on world list position

=== Men track events ===
Event	Gold		Silver		Bronze	
100 meters(Wind: +0.4 m/s)	Noah Lyles	9.83	Kenny Bednarek	9.87	Fred Kerley	9.88
200 meters (Wind: +0.5 m/s)	Noah Lyles	19.53 WL, MR	Kenny Bednarek	19.59	Erriyon Knighton	19.77
400 meters	Quincy Hall	44.17	Michael Norman	44.41	Christopher Bailey	44.42
800 meters	Bryce Hoppel	1:42.77 MR	Hobbs Kessler	1:43.64	Brandon Miller	1:43.97
1500 meters	Cole Hocker	3:30.59 MR	Yared Nuguse	3:30.86	Hobbs Kessler	3:31.53
5000 meters	Grant Fisher	13:08.85 MR	Abdihamid Nur	13:09.01	Parker Wolfe ≠	13:10.75
10,000 meters	Grant Fisher	27:49.47	Woody Kincaid	27:50.74	Nico Young	27:52.40
Marathon	Conner Mantz	2:09:05	Clayton Young	2:09:06	Leonard Korir	2:09:57
110 meters hurdles (Wind: 2.0;m/s)	Grant Holloway	12.86 WL	Freddie Crittenden	12.93	Daniel Roberts	12.96
400 meters hurdles	Rai Benjamin	46.46 WL, MR	CJ Allen	47.81	Trevor Bassitt	47.82
3000 meters steeplechase	Kenneth Rooks	8:21.92	Matthew Wilkinson	8:23.00	James Corrigan	8:26.78
20 km walk	Nick Christie	1:24:46	Emmanuel Corvera	1:30:15	Jordan Crawford	1:30:52

=== Men field events ===
Event	Gold		Silver		Bronze	
High jump	Shelby McEwen	2.30 m (7 ft 6 1/2 in)	Caleb Snowden	2.27 m (7 ft 5 1/4 in)	Tyus Wilson	2.24 m (7 ft 4 in)
Pole vault	Sam Kendricks	5.92 m (19 ft 5 in) MR	Chris Nilsen Jacob Wooten	5.87 m (19 ft 3 in)	Not awarded	
Long jump	Jeremiah Davis	8.20 m (26 ft 10 3/4 in) (Wind: 1.9 m/s)	Malcolm Clemons	8.18 m (26 ft 10 in) (Wind: 1.6 m/s)	Jarrion Lawson	8.18 m (26 ft 10 in) (Wind: 1.4 m/s)
Triple jump	Salif Mane	17.52 m (57 ft 5 3/4 in) (Wind: +0.0 m/s)	Russell Robinson	17.01 m (55 ft 9 1/2 in) (Wind: +0.0 m/s)	Donald Scott	16.87 m (55 ft 4 in) (Wind: +0.0 m/s)
Shot put	Ryan Crouser	22.84 m (74 ft 11 in)	Joe Kovacs	22.43 m (73 ft 7 in)	Payton Otterdahl	22.26 m (73 ft 0 in)
Discus throw	Andrew Evans	66.61 m (218 ft 6 in)	Sam Mattis	66.07 m (216 ft 9 in)	Joseph Brown	65.79 m (215 ft 10 in)
Hammer throw	Daniel Haugh	79.51 m (260 ft 10 in)	Rudy Winkler	78.89 m (258 ft 9 in)	Justin Stafford	77.07 m (252 ft 10 in)
Javelin throw	Curtis Thompson	83.04 m (272 ft 5 in)	Capers Williamson	79.57 m (261 ft 0 in)	Donavon Banks	79.19 m (259 ft 9 in)
Decathlon	Heath Baldwin	8625	Zach Ziemek	8516	Harrison Williams	8384

=== Notes ===
Parker Wolfe had not achieved the Olympic standard or a qualifying world ranking in the men's 5000m. Fourth place Graham Blanks, who had achieved the Olympic standard, was instead selected.

== Women's results ==
Key:
≠ Athlete without Olympic qualifying standard, not selected
Athlete without Olympic qualifying standard, invited to Olympics based on world list position

=== Women track events ===
Event	Gold		Silver		Bronze	
100 meters (Wind: 0.8 m/s)	Sha'Carri Richardson	10.71	Melissa Jefferson	10.80	Twanisha Terry	10.89
200 meters (Wind: 0.6 m/s)	Gabrielle Thomas	21.81	Brittany Brown	21.90	McKenzie Long	21.91
400 meters	Kendall Ellis	49.46	Aaliyah Butler	49.71	Alexis Holmes	49.78
800 meters	Nia Akins	1:57.36	Allie Wilson	1:58.32	Juliette Whittaker	1:58.45
1500 meters	Nikki Hiltz	3:55.33 MR	Emily Mackay	3:55.90	Elle St. Pierre	3:55.99
5000 meters	Elle St. Pierre	14:40.34 MR	Elise Cranny	14:40.36	Karissa Schweizer	14:45.12
10,000 meters	Weini Kelati	31:41.07	Parker Valby	31:41.56	Karissa Schweizer	31:41.56
Marathon	Fiona O'Keeffe	2:22:10	Emily Sisson	2:22:42	Dakotah Lindwurm	2:25:31
100 meters hurdles (Wind: 0.7 m/s)	Masai Russell	12.25 WL, MR	Alaysha Johnson	12.31	Grace Stark	12.31
400 meters hurdles	Sydney McLaughlin-Levrone	50.65 WR	Anna Cockrell	52.64	Jasmine Jones	52.77
3000 meters steeplechase	Valerie Constien	9:03.22 MR	Courtney Wayment	9:06.50	Marisa Howard	9:07.14
20 km walk	Robyn Stevens	1:37:38	Miranda Melville	1:39:38	Michelle Rohl	1:42:27

=== Women field events ===
Event	Gold		Silver		Bronze	
High jump	Charity Hufnagel	1.94 m (6 ft 4 1/4 in)	Rachel Glenn	1.94 m (6 ft 4 1/4 in)	Vashti Cunningham Jenna Rogers	1.91 m (6 ft 3 in)
Pole vault	Bridget Williams	4.73 m (15 ft 6 in)	Katie Moon	4.73 m (15 ft 6 in)	Brynn King	4.73 m (15 ft 6 in)
Long jump	Tara Davis-Woodhall	7.00 m (22 ft 11 1/2 in) (Wind: 2.6 m/s)	Jasmine Moore	6.98 m (22 ft 10 3/4 in) (Wind: 1.1 m/s)	Monae' Nichols	6.86 m (22 ft 6 in) (Wind: 0.2 m/s)
Triple jump	Jasmine Moore	14.26 m (46 ft 9 1/4 in) (Wind: 1.4 m/s)	Keturah Orji	14.22 m (46 ft 7 3/4 in) (Wind: 0.2 m/s)	Tori Franklin	13.72 m (45 ft 0 in) (Wind: 1.3 m/s)
Shot put	Chase Jackson	20.10 m (65 ft 11 in)	Raven Saunders	19.90 m (65 ft 3 in)	Jaida Ross	19.60 m (64 ft 3 in)
Discus throw	Valarie Allman	70.73 m (232 ft 0 in)	Jayden Ulrich	62.63 m (205 ft 5 in)	Veronica Fraley	62.54 m (205 ft 2 in)
Hammer throw	Annette Echikunwoke	74.68 m (245 ft 0 in)	DeAnna Price	74.52 m (244 ft 5 in)	Erin Reese	71.21 m (233 ft 7 in)
Javelin throw	Maggie Malone-Hardin	64.58 m (211 ft 10 in) MR	Kara Winger	62.94 m (206 ft 5 in)	Madison Wiltrout	61.17 m (200 ft 8 in)
Heptathlon	Anna Hall	6614	Chari Hawkins	6456	Taliyah Brooks	6408

=== Notes ===
Whittni Morgan, who placed fifth in the 5,000 meters in 15:05.53, was named to the Olympic team after both Elle St. Pierre, who won, decided to only run the 1500 meters at the Olympics and Parker Valby, who placed fourth and was first in line to replace her, decided to only run the 10,000 meters at the Olympics.

== Schedule ==
Event schedule
SATURDAY, February 3, 2024
NBC Television Peacock (streaming service)
Time (EST)	Event	Division	Round
10:00 a.m.	Marathon	Women	Final
10:00 a.m.	Marathon	Men	Final

Event Schedule
DAY ONE—FRIDAY, June 21, 2024
NBC
Time (PDT)	Event	Division	Round
10:00 a.m.	100m Dec	Men	Decathlon
3:20 p.m.	400m	Men	1st Round
3:48 p.m.	400m	Women	1st Round
4:17 p.m.	800m	Women	1st Round
4:49 p.m.	3000m Steeplechase	Men	1st Round
5:22 p.m.	1500m	Men	1st Round
5:53 p.m.	100m	Women	1st Round
6:22 p.m.	5000m	Women	1st Round
7:05 p.m.	400m Dec	Men	Decathlon
7:27 p.m.	10,000m	Men	Final
Field Events
11:00 a.m.	Hammer Throw	Women	1st Round
3:30 p.m.	Javelin Throw	Men	1st Round
5:50 p.m.	Pole Vault	Men	1st Round
6:15 p.m.	Shot Put	Men	1st Round
6:50 p.m.	Triple Jump	Women	1st Round
Decathlon
10:00 a.m.	100m Dec	M	Decathlon
11:01 a.m.	Long Jump Dec	M	Decathlon
12:11 p.m.	Shot Put Dec	M	Decathlon
4:30 p.m.	High Jump Dec	M	Decathlon
7:05 p.m.	400m Dec	M	Decathlon
DAY TWO—SATURDAY, June 22, 2024
10:00 a.m.	110m hurdles	Men	Decathlon
6:03 p.m.	100m	Women	Semifinals
6:00 p.m.	100m	Women	Semifinals
6:22 p.m.	100m	Men	1st Round
6:54 p.m.	1500m	Men	Semifinals
7:20 p.m.	400m	Women	Semifinals
7:50 p.m.	100m	Women	Final
Field Events
4:45 p.m.	Long Jump	Men	1st Round
5:00 p.m.	High Jump	Women	1st Round
6:20 p.m.	Triple Jump	Women	Final
7:38 p.m.	1500m	Men	Decathlon
7:50 p.m.	100m	Women	Final
6:40 p.m.	Shot Put	Men	Final
Decathlon
10:00 a.m.	110m hurdles	Men	Decathlon
11:08 a.m.	Discus throw	Men	Decathlon
1:17 p.m.	Pole vault	Men	Decathlon
5:15 p.m.	Javelin	Men	Decathlon
7:38 p.m.	1500m	Men	Decathlon
DAY THREE—SUNDAY, June 23, 2024
10:00 a.m.	100m Hurdles Hep	Women	Heptathlon
5:48 p.m.	100m	Men	Semi-Finals
6:11 p.m.	800m	Women	Semi-Finals
6:35 p.m.	400m	Men	Semi-Finals
6:58 p.m.	400m	Women	Final
7:07 p.m.	3000m Steeplechase	Men	Final
7:26 p.m.	200m Hep	Women	Heats
7:49 p.m.	100m	Men	Final
Field Events
5:00 p.m.	Hammer Throw	Women	Final
5:45 p.m.	Pole Vault	Men	Final
6:40 p.m.	Javelin Throw	Men	Final
Heptathlon
10:00 a.m.	100m Hurdles Hep	Women	Heptathlon
11:23 a.m.	High Jump Hep	Women	Heptathlon
6:10 p.m.	Shot Put Hep	Women	Heptathlon
7:26 p.m.	200m Hep	Women	Heptathlon
DAY FOUR—MONDAY, June 24, 2024
5:05 p.m.	110m Hurdles	Men	1st Round
5:47 p.m.	1500m	Men	Final
5:59 p.m.	3000m Steeplechase	Women	1st Round
6:37 p.m.	800m Hep - A	Women	Heptathlon
6:48 p.m.	800m Hep - B	Women	Heptathlon
6:59 p.m.	400m	Men	Final
7:09 p.m.	5000m	Women	Final
7:32 p.m.	800m	Women	Final
Field Events
5:00 p.m.	Discus Throw	Women	1st Round
5:15 p.m.	High Jump	Women	Final
5:25 p.m.	Long Jump	Men	Final
Heptathlon
10:00 a.m.	Long jump	Women	Heptathlon
11:10 a.m.	Javelin throw	Women	Heptathlon
6:37 p.m.	800m - b	Women	Heptathlon
6:48 p.m.	800m - a	Women	Heptathlon
DAY FIVE—TUESDAY, June 25, 2024
DAY SIX—WEDNESDAY, June 26, 2024
DAY SEVEN—THURSDAY, June 27, 2024
4:30 p.m.	800m	Men	1st Round
5:01 p.m.	110m Hurdles	Men	Semi-Finals
5:23 p.m.	1500m	Women	1st Round
5:51 p.m.	200m	Women	1st Round
6:20 p.m.	400m Hurdles	Men	1st Round
6:49 p.m.	400m Hurdles	Women	1st Round
7:18 p.m.	3000m Steeplechase	Women	Final
7:33 p.m.	200m	Men	1st Round
8:03 p.m.	5000m	Men	1st Round
Field Events
4:55 p.m.	Discus Throw	Women	Final
5:00 p.m.	High Jump	Men	1st Round
6:18 p.m.	Long Jump	Women	1st Round
6:45 p.m.	Discus Throw	Men	1st Round
DAY EIGHT—FRIDAY, June 28, 2024
5:28 p.m.	100m Hurdles	Women	1st Round
5:58 p.m.	1500m	Women	Semi-Finals
6:21 p.m.	400m Hurdles	Men	Semi-Finals
6:44 p.m.	800m	Men	Semi-Finals
7:06 p.m.	200m	Women	Semi-Finals
7:28 p.m.	200m	Men	Semi-Finals
7:50 p.m.	110m Hurdles	Men	Final
Field Events
4:00 p.m.	Javelin Throw	Women	1st Round
4:30 p.m.	Hammer Throw	Men	1st Round
5:55 p.m.	Pole Vault	Women	1st Round
6:20 p.m.	Triple Jump	Men	1st Round
7:15 p.m.	Shot Put	Women	1st Round
DAY NINE—SATURDAY, June 29, 2024
7:30 a.m.	20 km Race Walk	Men	Final
7:31 a.m.	20 km Race Walk	Women	Final
5:04 p.m.	100m Hurdles	Women	Semi-Finals
5:27 p.m.	200m	Women	Final
5:41 p.m.	400m Hurdles	Women	Semi-Finals
6:09 p.m.	10,000m	Women	Final
6:49 p.m.	200m	Men	Final
FIELD EVENTS
4:30 p.m.	Discus Throw	Men	Final
5:20 p.m.	Long Jump	Women	Final
5:50 p.m.	Shot Put	Women	Final
DAY TEN—SUNDAY, June 30, 2024
4:30 p.m.	5000m	Men	Final
4:51 p.m.	800m	Men	Final
5:00 p.m.	100m Hurdles	Women	Final
5:09 p.m.	1500m	Women	Final
5:20 p.m.	400m Hurdles	Men	Final
5:29 p.m.	400m Hurdles	Women	Final
FIELD EVENTS
3:15 p.m.	Pole Vault	Women	Final
3:15 p.m.	Hammer Throw	Men	Final
3:30 p.m.	High Jump	Men	Final
3:55 p.m.	Triple Jump	Men	Final
4:10 p.m.	Javelin Throw	Women	Final

== Qualification ==
An athlete was eligible for "automatic qualification" into the Trials (USATF Rule 8) if that athlete has accomplished the following:

- Placing 1st at either the 2022 USATF Marathon Championship or the 2023 USATF Marathon Championship
- Earned an individual medal in the 2022 World Athletics Championships Marathon or 2023 World Athletics Championships Marathon
- Was a member of the 2020 U.S. Olympic Marathon Team.

Event	Men's standard	Men's minimum	Women's standard	Women's minimum	Max entrants	Rounds
100 m	10.05	10.20	11.07	11.30	36	3
200 m	20.30	20.60	22.57	23.00	35	3
400 m	45.20	46.00	51.20	52.50	35	3
800 m	1:46.30	1:47.50	2:00.50	2:03.50	36	3
1500 m	3:37.00; Mile 3:53.00	3:40.00; Mile 3:56.00	4:06.00; Mile 4:25.00	4:12.00; Mile 4:31.00	36	3
5000 m	13:25.00	13:38.00	15:10.00	15:45.00	30	2
10,000 m	27:45.00	28:50.00	31:30.00	33:20.0	24	1
20,000 m race walk	1:36:00		1:48:00		15	1
35,000 m race walk	3:30:00		4:00:00		15	1
110/100 m hurdles	13.50	13.75	12.90	13.25	36	3
400 m hurdles	49.75	51.00	56.20	58.00	35	3
3000 m steeplechase	8:30.00	8:43.00	9:41.00	10:12.00	30	2
High jump	2.23 m (7 ft 3 3/4 in)	2.17 m (7 ft 1 1/4 in)	1.87 m (6 ft 1 1/2 in)	1.80 m (5 ft 10 3/4 in)	24	2
Pole vault	5.72 m (18 ft 9 in)	5.40 m (17 ft 8 1/2 in)	4.60 m (15 ft 1 in)	4.30 m (14 ft 1 1/4 in)	24	2
Long jump	8.05 m (26 ft 4 3/4 in)	7.75 m (25 ft 5 in)	6.60 m (21 ft 7 3/4 in)	6.25 m (20 ft 6 in)	24	2
Triple jump	16.40 m (53 ft 9 1/2 in)	15.75 m (51 ft 8 in)	13.50 m (44 ft 3 1/4 in)	12.80 m (41 ft 11 3/4 in)	24	2
Shot put	20.25 m (66 ft 5 in)	18.90 m (62 ft 0 in)	17.90 m (58 ft 8 1/2 in)	16.50 m (54 ft 1 1/2 in)	24	2
Discus throw	62.00 m (203 ft 4 3/4 in)	57.50 m (188 ft 7 3/4 in)	58.50 m (191 ft 11 in)	53.50 m (175 ft 6 1/4 in)	24	2
Hammer throw	72.00 m (236 ft 2 1/2 in)	67.00 m (219 ft 9 3/4 in)	70.00 m (229 ft 7 3/4 in)	63.00 m (206 ft 8 1/4 in)	24	2
Javelin throw	75.00 m (246 ft 3/4 in)	69.00 m (226 ft 4 1/2 in)	54.00 m (177 ft 1 3/4 in)	49.00 m (160 ft 9 in)	24	2
Decathlon/Heptathlon	7900 pts	7250 pts	6000 pts	5500 pts	18	1
