= Dash Sirmon =

American javelin thrower (born 2004)

Personal information
- Born: 10 February 2004 (age 22)

Sport
- Sport: Athletics
- Event: Shot put

Achievements and titles
- Personal bests: Javelin: 80.86 m (Ann Arbor, 2024)
Medal record
Men's athletics
Representing United States
NACAC Championships
Silver medal – second place	2025 Freeport	Javelin
NACAC U23 Championships
Silver medal – second place	2023 San Jose	Javelin

Dash Sirmon (born 10 February 2004) is an American javelin thrower. He finished in second place overall at the 2025 USA Outdoor Track and Field Championships and the 2025 NACAC Championships.

== Early life ==
From Walla Walla, Washington, He attended Walla Walla High School and was a multi-event athlete in high school, having the national high school lead in the javelin throw in the spring of 2022, and winning both the long jump title and the javelin title at the 2022 Washington WIAA Outdoor Championships in Tacoma in May 2022.

== Career ==
After beginning to compete at the collegiate level for the University of Nebraska–Lincoln, his freshman year saw him place thirteenth in the javelin throw at the 2023 NCAA Division I Outdoor Track and Field Championships in Austin, Texas. In July 2023, he became the American under-20 javelin champion in Eugene, Oregon with a throw of 70.87 metres. He was runner-up to Keyshawn Strachan in the javelin throw at the 2023 NACAC U23 Championships in Costa Rica, with a best distance of 75.28 metres.

He threw a personal best of 80.86 metres at the Big Ten Championships in Ann Arbor, Michigan in May 2024, helping Nebraska to the overall team title. He finished fourth overall at the 2024 US Olympic Trials in June 2024 with a throw of 76.83 metres.

Competing for the Nebraska Cornhuskers, he won all-American honours for a third time at the 2025 NCAA Championships after throwing 69.17m. He threw 77.28 metres to place second overall in the javelin throw behind Curtis Thompson at the 2025 USA Outdoor Track and Field Championships in Eugene, Oregon. He won the silver medal at the 2025 NACAC Championships in August, again runner-up to Thompson, with a best throw of 77.04 metres.
