= Jeremiah Davis (long jumper) =

American athlete (born 2001)

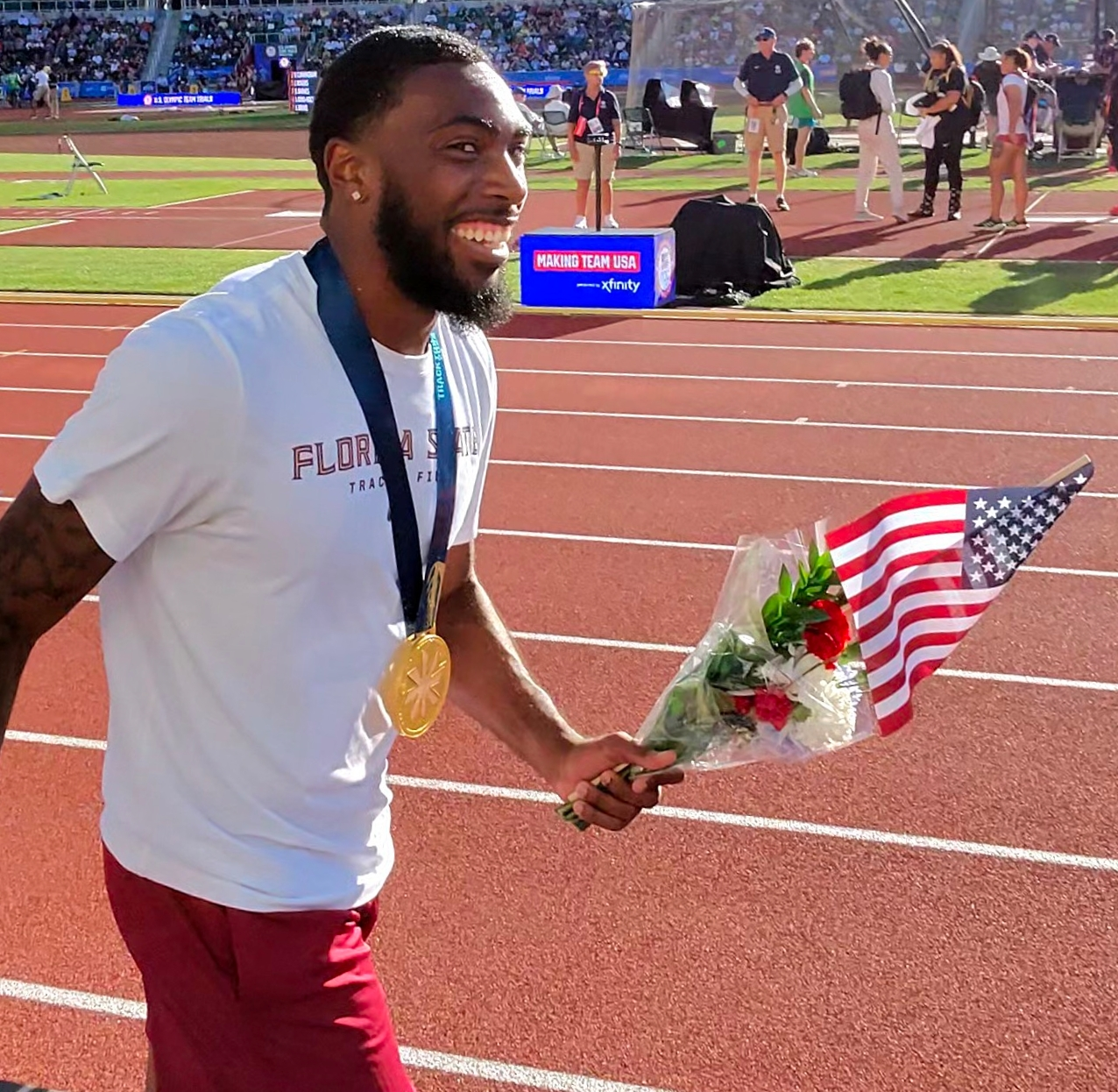
- Davis at the 2024 United States Olympic trials

Personal information
- Nationality: American
- Born: August 31, 2001 (age 24)

Sport
- Sport: Athletics
- Event: Long jump

Achievements and titles
- Personal bests: Long jump: 8.37m (Albuquerque, 2023)
Medal record
Men's athletics
Representing United States
NACAC U23 Championships
| Silver medal – second place | 2023 San Jose | Long jump |

Jeremiah Davis (born August 31, 2001) is an American long jumper. He won the US Olympic trials in 2024 and represented the United States at the 2024 Olympic Games and 2025 World Athletics Championships prior to finishing fifth overall at the 2026 World Athletics Indoor Championships.

== Biography ==
Davis attended Lehigh Senior High School and Florida State University. Davis jumped a personal best 8.37m to finish third in the long jump at the 2023 NCAA Division I Indoor Championships in Albuquerque, New Mexico in March 2023. In April, be jumped a personal best 16.78 metres in the triple jump in Baton Rouge. That summer, he was a silver medalist in the long jump with 8.10 metres behind Malcolm Clemons representing the United States at the NACAC U23 Championships in San Jose, Costa Rica in July 2023.

Davis jumped 8.20 metres to finish as runner-up in the long jump to Wayne Pinnock but ahead of Clemons at the 2024 NCAA Indoor Championships in Boston, Massachusetts in March 2024. At the same event, he finished third in the triple jump competition. Davis was runner-up to compatriot JC Stevenson in the long jump at the 2024 NCAA Division 1 Outdoor Championships in Eugene, Oregon in June 2024. Later that month, Davis won the long jump at the 2024 United States Olympic trials in Eugene with a distance of 8.20 metres. He subsequently competed in the long jump at the 2024 Paris Olympics where he landed a best jump of 7.83 metres without advancing to the final.

Davis finished ninth at the 2025 Shanghai Diamond League event in China on 3 May 2025. In September 2025, he competed at the 2025 World Championships in Tokyo, Japan, without advancing to the final.

On 1 March 2026, he jumped 8.08 metres to finish runner-up behind Steffin McCarter at the 2026 USA Indoor Track and Field Championships. He was selected to represent the United States at the 2026 World Athletics Indoor Championships in Toruń, Poland, placing fifth overall.
