= Madison Wiltrout =

American javelin thrower (born 1999)

Personal information
- Born: 4 June 1999 (age 27)

Sport
- Sport: Athletics
- Event: Javelin throw

Achievements and titles
- Personal best: Javelin: 63.74 m (2026)
Medal record
Women's athletics
Representing United States
NACAC Championships
| Silver medal – second place | 2025 Freeport | Javelin throw |

Madison Wiltrout (born 4 June 1999) is an American javelin thrower from Pennsylvania. She is the American junior national record holder and won the senior 2026 USA Outdoor Track and Field Championships.

== Biography ==
Wiltrout was born to Amy and Tom Wiltrout, and grew up in Connellsville, Pennsylvania. She was coached as a junior by former Olympian Bill Schmidt. On May 7, 2015, she broke the high school national record for the javelin throw. She also went on to recover from elbow ligament surgery to win the national title in the event as a senior high schooler at the New Balance Nationals Outdoor in Greensboro, North Carolina. She graduated high school in 2017 and in 2023 was inducted into the Pennsylvania Track and Field Hall of Fame.

Competing for the University of North Carolina she won three Atlantic Coast Conference titles and qualified for four NCAA Championships, finishing third in her freshman year, and again in 2022. That year, she threw over 60 metres for the first time in Durham, North Carolina. She graduated with a degree in sports administration in 2023.

Wiltrout finished third in the javelin throw at the 2023 USA Outdoor Track and Field Championships in July 2023 in Eugene, Oregon behind Maddie Harris and Maggie Malone, with a throw of 55.51 metres.

Wiltrout placed third at the US Olympic Trials in June 2024, finishing behind Kara Winger and Maggie Malone-Hardin, with a personal best throw of 61.17 metres, recording two throws on the day further than 60 metres.

Wiltrout went into the 2025 American national championships ahead of Harris as the number one ranked competitor from the United States in the world rankings, and with a season's best throw over 60 metres in competition in May 2025 in North Carolina. She threw 56.46 metres to place second overall in the javelin throw at the 2025 USA Outdoor Track and Field Championships in Eugene, Oregon. She was named in the United States squad for the 2025 NACAC Championships, winning the silver medal with a throw of 58.33 metres.

Wiltrout competed at the 2025 World Athletics Championships in Tokyo, Japan, in September 2025, throwing 59.58 metres without advancing to the final.

On 28 March 2026, she won the javelin throw at the USATF Winter Long Throws National Championship in Arizona with a throw of 61.29 metres. The following month, she improved her personal best to 63.74 metres at the Drake Relays.

On 23 July 2026, she won the women's javelin with a best of 61.53 metres for her first national title at the 2026 USA Outdoor Track and Field Championships in New York, winning ahead of defending champion Evelyn Bliss.
