= Athletics at the 2023 Pan American Games – Women's javelin throw =

Women's javelin throw at the 2023 Pan American Games
- Venue: Julio Martínez National Stadium
- Dates: November 3
- Competitors: 11 from 9 nations
- Winning distance: 63.10

Medalists
Gold medal	Flor Ruiz	Colombia
Silver medal	Rhema Otabor	Bahamas
Bronze medal	Madelyn Harris	United States

The women's javelin throw competition of the athletics events at the 2023 Pan American Games was held on November 3 at the Julio Martínez National Stadium of Santiago, Chile.

== Records ==
Prior to this competition, the existing world and Pan American Games records were as follows:

World record	Barbora Spotakova (CZE)	72.28	Stuttgart, Germany	September 13, 2008
Pan American Games record	Olisdeilys Menéndez (CUB)	65.85	Winnipeg, Canada	July 25, 1999

== Schedule ==
Date	Time	Round
November 3, 2023	19:10	Final

== Results ==
All times shown are in seconds.

KEY:	NR	National record	PB	Personal best	SB	Seasonal best	DQ	Disqualified

=== Final ===
The results were as follows:

Rank	Name	Nationality	#1	#2	#3	#4	#5	#6	Mark	Notes
1st place, gold medalist(s)	Flor Ruiz	Colombia	63.10	59.59	61.75	62.37	X	59.09	63.10	
2nd place, silver medalist(s)	Rhema Otabor	Bahamas	60.54	59.32	58.09	57.13	57.64	X	60.54	PB
3rd place, bronze medalist(s)	Madelyn Harris	United States	53.91	60.06	55.34	X	52.96	X	60.06	
4	María Lucelly Murillo	Colombia	X	59.19	57.88	X	55.32	58.57	59.19	
5	Jucilene de Lima	Brazil	57.22	59.04	X	56.73	X	57.62	59.04	
6	Manuela Rotundo	Uruguay	58.35	53.79	49.49	49.75	57.31	54.29	58.35	NR
7	Luz Castro	Mexico	55.13	55.22	52.38	50.13	54.73	56.29	56.29	
8	Rebekah Wales	United States	54.31	52.98	X	52.29	X	50.60	54.31	
9	Sophia Rivera	Puerto Rico	49.52	53.75	49.51				53.75	
10	Laura Paredes	Paraguay	52.81	49.54	47.86				52.81	SB
11	María Ríos	Chile	X	X	48.43				48.43	
