= Capers Williamson =

American javelin thrower (born 1992)

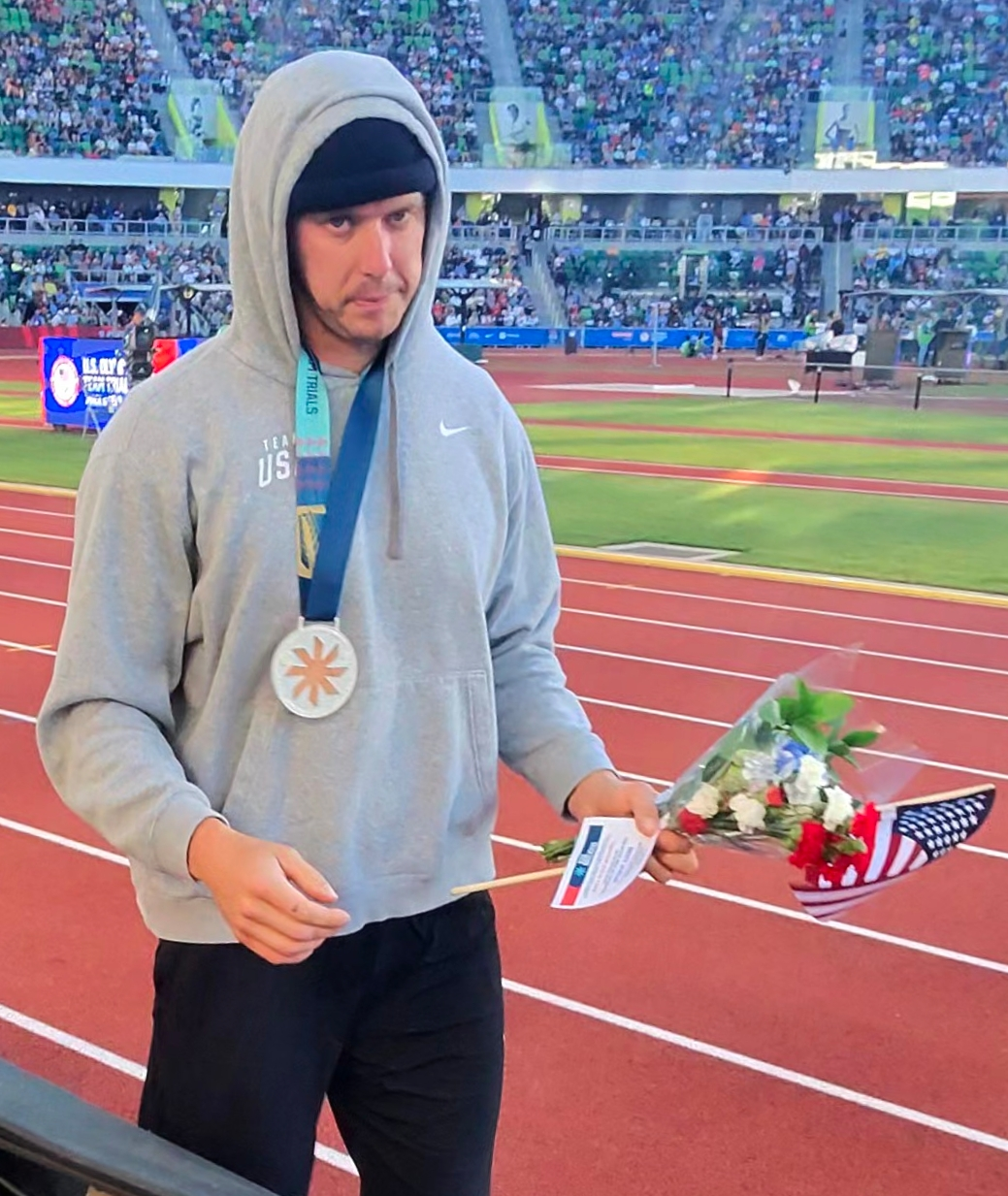
- Williamson at the 2024 United States Olympic trials

Personal information
- Nationality: American
- Born: October 13, 1992 (age 33)

Sport
- Sport: Athletics
- Event: Javelin

Achievements and titles
- Personal bests: Javelin: 80.49 (East Stroudsburg, 2021)

Capers Williamson (born October 13, 1992) is an American athlete and Olympian who throws the javelin.

== Career ==
Raised in Greenville, South Carolina, Williamson is a 2014 graduate of Wade Hampton High School. Williamson competed in the NCAA for the football and track and field teams at The Citadel Military College of South Carolina from 2010 to 2016. He was originally recruited as a football quarterback to The Citadel, but, after seeing him throw a football, a teammate suggested that he try out javelin. At The Citadel, he competed in high jump and javelin. He won the Southern Conference Outdoor Championships in the javelin in 2015 and 2016. However, in his time in the NCAA, he failed to advance to an NCAA Championship.

In his first full season as a professional, Williamson placed 12th at the 2017 USA Outdoor Track and Field Championships. In 2018, he placed second at the meet with a throw of 75.71m. Later that year, Williamson placed fourth at the 2018 NACAC Championships - his first time representing the U.S. internationally. At the 2021 Olympic Trials, he placed sixth, and at the 2022 USA Outdoor Championships, he placed fourth.

At the 2023 USA Outdoor Championships, Williamson placed second to Curtis Thompson and qualified for the 2023 World Athletics Championships. He also represented the U.S. in November 2023 at the Pan American Games. At that competition, he placed fourth.

In 2024, Williamson threw a season's best at his second Olympic Trials with a 79.57m throw to qualify for the 2024 Paris Olympics.

== Personal life ==
In the lead-up to the 2018 U.S. Outdoor Track and Field Championships, Williamson commented that "javelin saved his life" and credited the sport with helping him avoid a different path.

In a 2018 interview with The Greenville News, Williamson described his recovery from drug and alcohol abuse. He said he flipped a Camaro the previous year while taking Xanax and drinking beer. He told The Greenville News, "I flipped a Camaro going 130 miles an hour and should be dead. You know what I mean? I had a helicopter over my head looking for me in the Santee Cooper swamp." He began attending Alcoholics Anonymous meetings and had been sober for 90 days when he threw the javelin 79.07 meters in Jena, Germany, setting a personal record and becoming the top-ranked U.S. javelin thrower.
