= Euphenie Andre =

American triple jumper (born 2001)

Personal information
- Born: 16 March 2001 (age 25)

Sport
- Sport: Athletics
- Event: Triple jump

Achievements and titles
- Personal best: Triple jump: 13.94m (2026)
Medal record
Women's athletics
Representing United States
NACAC Championships
Silver medal – second place	2025 Freeport	Triple jump
NACAC U23 Championships
Silver medal – second place	2023 San Jose	Triple jump

Euphenie Andre (born 16 March 2001) is an American triple jumper. She won the triple jump title at the 2026 USA Outdoor Track and Field Championships and won the silver medal at the 2025 NACAC Championships.

== Biography ==
Born in Dover Plains, New York, Andre attended Dover High School, and initially competed in high jump and long jump. She was the 2019 New York state outdoor high school triple jump champion.

Andre began at the University of Missouri at the start of the 2019-20 season. Although the start of her collegiate career was disrupted by the Covid-19 pandemic, in 2021 she won first-team ll-American for honours for indoor track and field as she places eighth in the triple jump at the 2021 NCAA Indoor Championships.

Andre won the silver medal at the 2023 NACAC U23 Championships in San Jose, Costa Rica, with a personal best triple jump of 13.42 metres. The following year, she also jumped 23.42 metres to win the SEC Outdoor Championships. That June, she had a seventh place finish at the 2024 US Olympic Trials, jumping 13.31 metres.

Competing in 2025, Andre broke the University of Missouri indoor triple jump record with 13.55 metres at the 2025 NCAA Indoor Championships, placing sixth overall. On 2 August 2025, Andre jumped a personal-best 13.64 meters for third place in the triple jump at the 2025 USA Outdoor Track and Field Championships. Andre won the silver medal at the 2025 NACAC Championships in Freeport, Bahamas.

In June 2026, she set a new personal best of 13.73 metres to place fourth representing the United States at the 2026 Pan American Championships in Medelin. On 24 July, she won the triple jump title at the 2026 USA Outdoor Track and Field Championships in New York, with a new personal best jump of 13.94 metres.

== Personal life ==
Andre is of Haitian and Barbadian descent.
