= Salif Mane =

American athlete (born 2001)

Personal information
- Nationality: American
- Born: December 12, 2001 (age 24)

Sport
- Sport: Athletics
- Event: Triple jump

Achievements and titles
- Personal bests: Triple jump: 17.52m (Eugene, 2024)
Medal record
Men's athletics
Representing United States
NACAC U23 Championships
Silver medal – second place	2023 San Jose	Triple jump

Salif Mane (/ˈsɑːlɪf ˈmɑːneɪ/ SAH-lif MAH-nay; born December 12, 2001) is an American triple jumper. He won the US Olympic trials in 2024 and the USA Championships in 2026. He was a finalist at the 2025 World Athletics Championships.

== Early life ==
From The Bronx, New York City, he attended Bronx High School for Medical Science.

== Career ==
Mane finished fourth in the triple jump at the 2023 USATF Outdoor Championships and was named as a reserve for the 2023 World Athletics Championships. He was runner up in the NACAC U23 Championships triple jump competition in San Jose, Costa Rica in July 2023.

He won the NCAA Division 1 Outdoor triple jump title in Eugene, Oregon in June 2024 competing for Fairleigh Dickinson University. Prior to his time at FDU, Mane also competed for Lincoln Blue Tigers in NCAA Division II.

He won the 2024 United States Olympic trials in Eugene, Oregon on June 30, 2024, recording a personal best distance of 17.52 metres. He subsequently competed in the triple jump at the 2024 Paris Olympics, placing sixth overall.

He finished in seventh place in the triple jump at the 2025 Xiamen Diamond League event in China, in April 2025. He placed eighth at the 2025 Shanghai Diamond League event in China on 3 May 2025. He placed second in the triple jump with 17.15 metres at the 2025 USA Outdoor Track and Field Championships in Eugene, Oregon. In September 2025, he was a finalist at the 2025 World Championships in Tokyo, Japan, placing twelfth overall.

On 25 July, Mane won the triple jump national title at the 2026 USA Outdoor Track and Field Championships in New York. He was trailing Russell Robinson prior to Mane's final jump of 16.66 metres which tied the lead, with Mane granted the title with a superior second-best jump.

== Personal life ==
His parents moved to New York in the 1990s from Senegal. He has two siblings, a brother and a sister. His mother, Fatou Seye, runs a hair-braiding business in the South Bronx. His father, Thierno Mane, died in April 2020 of the novel coronavirus during the COVID-19 pandemic.
