= Benard Keter =

American athlete (born 1992)

Benard Kiplangat Keter
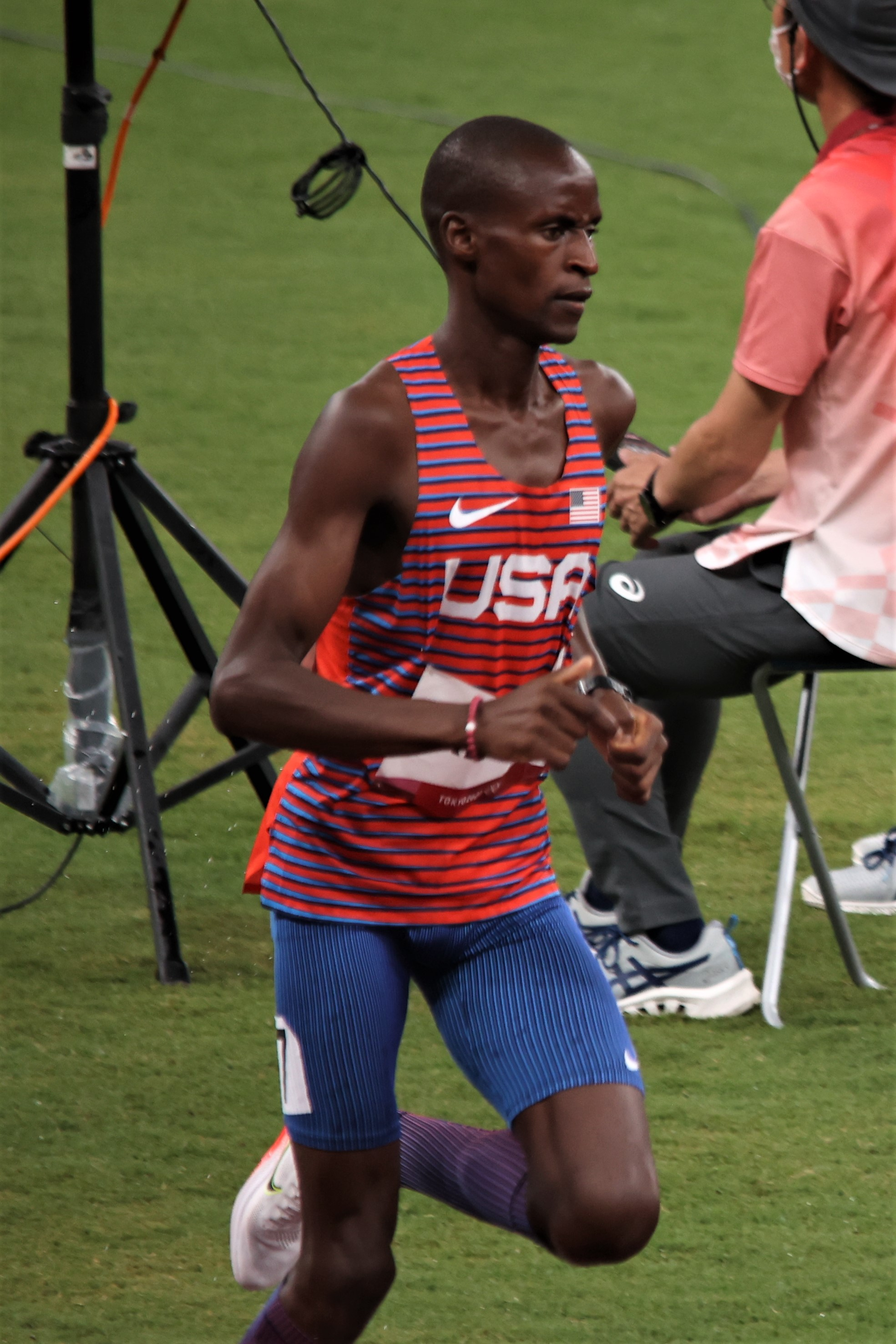
- Keter at the 2020 Summer Olympics

Personal information
- Nickname: Bernie
- Born: May 25, 1992 (age 34) Molo, Kenya
- Employer: United States Army Reserve
- Height: 5 ft 8 in (173 cm)
- Weight: 127 lb (58 kg)

Sport
- Country: United States
- Sport: Track and field
- Event: 3000 metres steeplechase
- College team: Cloud County Community College, Wayland Baptist University, Texas Tech Red Raiders
- Club: U.S. Army WCAP
- Coached by: Scott Simmons

Achievements and titles
- Personal bests: Outdoor; 3000 m SC: 8:16.11 (Brussels, 2025)

Benard Kiplangat Keter (born May 25, 1992) is an American athlete who competes primarily in the 3000 metres steeplechase.

== Personal life ==
Born in Molo, Kenya, Keter attended Tengecha Boys High School in Kapkatet, Kenya. His brother is Tareq Mubarak Taher who, running for Bahrain, finished 11th in the steeplechase at the 2008 Olympics in Beijing.

== Career ==
Keter came to America on a scholarship and won numerous honors during his college days as a distance runner for Cloud County Community College, Wayland Baptist University and Texas Tech University. Keter was NJCAA 3000m steeplechase, an NAIA national champion in cross country, the 5,000m indoors and the steeplechase outdoors, and was a four-time Big 12 champion and a first-team all-American.

In August 2019 he finished 4th in the 2019 Pan American Games – Men's 3000 metres steeplechase, held in Lima in a time of 8:32.76. He competed in The Match Europe v USA at the Dinamo National Olympic Stadium, Minsk and finished 5th in 8:44.63. Keter is the United States Army Reserve, where he is in unit supply holding the rank of specialist.

He ran an 8:21.81 at the American Olympic trials at Hayward Field, Eugene, Oregon on June 25, 2021, coming in second to Hillary Bor and ahead of Mason Ferlic. The result ensured Keter a place in the U.S. contingent for the delayed 2020 Summer Games in Tokyo. He ran a personal best time of 8:17.31 in finishing sixth in his Olympic heat.

Competing at the 2023 USA Outdoor Track and Field Championships, in Eugene, Oregon, he finished second in the final of the 3000m steeplechase, in a new personal best time of 8:17.19. He was selected for the 2023 World Athletics Championships in Budapest in August 2023.
