= Russell Robinson (triple jumper) =

American athlete (born 2001)

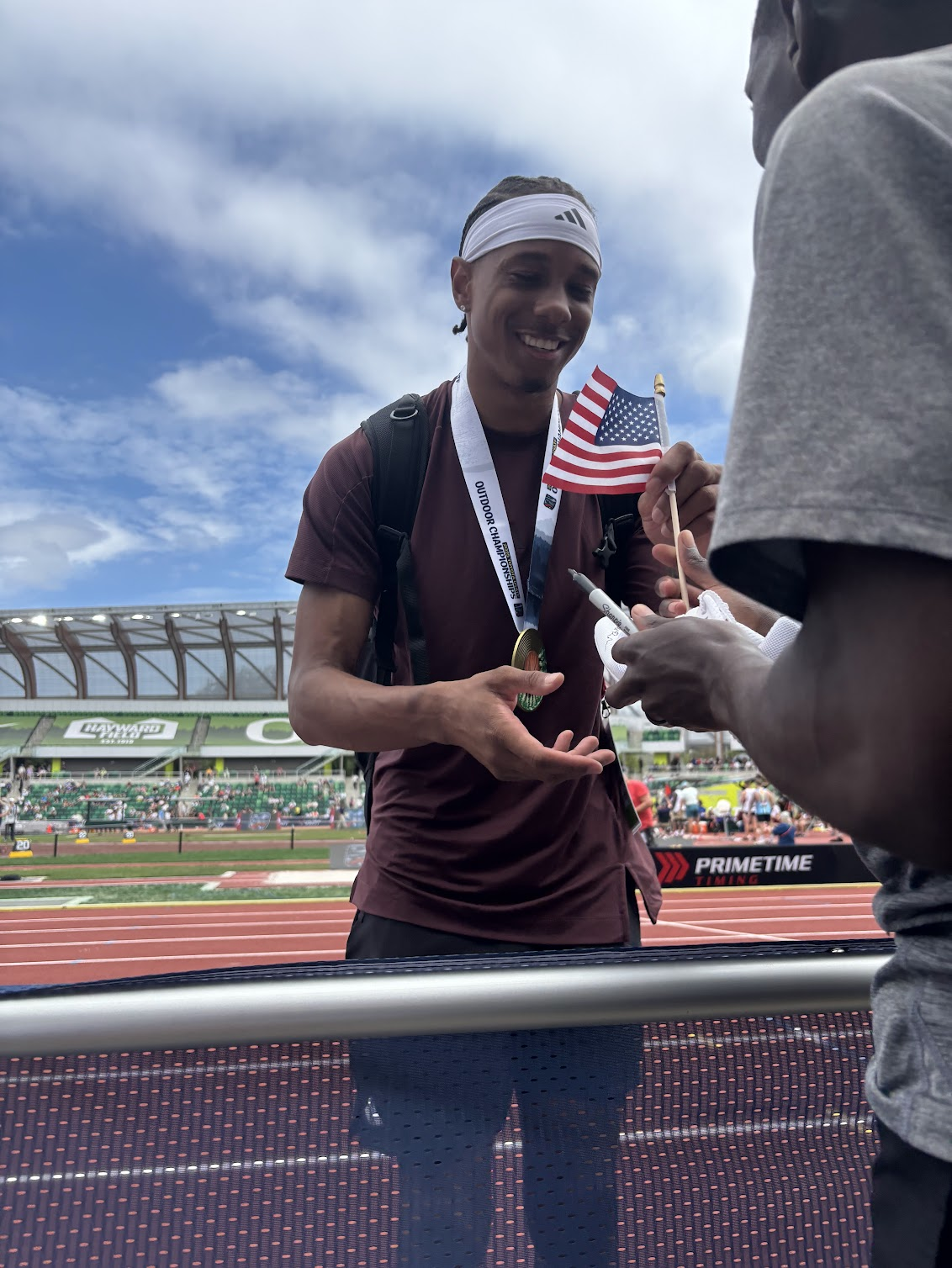
- Robinson at the 2025 USA Outdoor Track and Field Championships

Personal information
- Nationality: American
- Born: June 27, 2001 (age 25)

Sport
- Sport: Athletics
- Event: Triple jump

Achievements and titles
- Personal bests: Triple jump: 17.54m (Memphis, 2026)
Medal record
Men's athletics
Representing United States
NACAC U23 Championships
| Gold medal – first place | 2023 San Jose | Triple jump |

Russell Robinson (born June 27, 2001) is an American triple jumper. He won the 2025 USA Outdoor Championships and the 2025 and 2026 USA Indoor Championships. He has represented the United States at multiple major championships, including the 2024 Olympic Games.

== Early life ==
He attended West Orange High School in Winter Garden, Florida where he was state high school champion for the long jump, prior to attending the University of Miami.

== Career ==
Robinson won the gold medal representing the United States in the triple jump at the NACAC U23 Championships in San Jose, Costa Rica in July 2023.

He won the triple jump at the NCAA Indoor Championships in Boston, Massachusetts in March 2024. He was runner-up at the NCAA Division 1 Outdoor Championships in Eugene, Oregon in June 2024, where he set a University of Miami school record of 17.13 metres. He placed second at the 2024 United States Olympic trials in Eugene, Oregon on June 30, 2024. He had been the top qualifier for the final, recording a personal best distance of 17.28 metres. He subsequently competed in the triple jump at the 2024 Paris Olympics.

Robinson won the 2025 USA Indoor Track and Field Championships with a triple jump of 16.67 metres. He was subsequently selected for the 2025 World Athletics Indoor Championships in Nanjing in March 2025, placing eighth overall with a best jump of 16.50 metres. He won the triple jump title with 17.15 metres at the 2025 USA Outdoor Track and Field Championships in Eugene, Oregon. In September 2025, he competed at the 2025 World Championships in Tokyo, Japan.

In February 2026, Robinson successfully defended his title with a jump of 16.59 at the 2026 USA Indoor Track and Field Championships. He was selected to represent the United States at the 2026 World Athletics Indoor Championships in Toruń, Poland, where he placed eleventh overall with a best jump of 16.53 metres. The following month, Robinson jumped 17.16 m in the triple jump at the 2026 Mt. SAC Relays in California. In July, he won the triple jump with a new personal best 17.54 metres at the Ed Murphey Classic in Memphis, Tennessee. On 25 July, he placed second at the 2026 USA Outdoor Track and Field Championships in New York, after he and Salif Mane both jumped 16.66 metres with Mane granted the win with a superior second-best jump. Robinson was leading on his own until Mane's final jump. Competing in the Diamond League at the 2026 Athletissima in Lausanne, Switzerland on 21 August 2026, he placed fourth with 16.93 metres.
