= Rhema Otabor =

Bahamian athlete (born 2002)

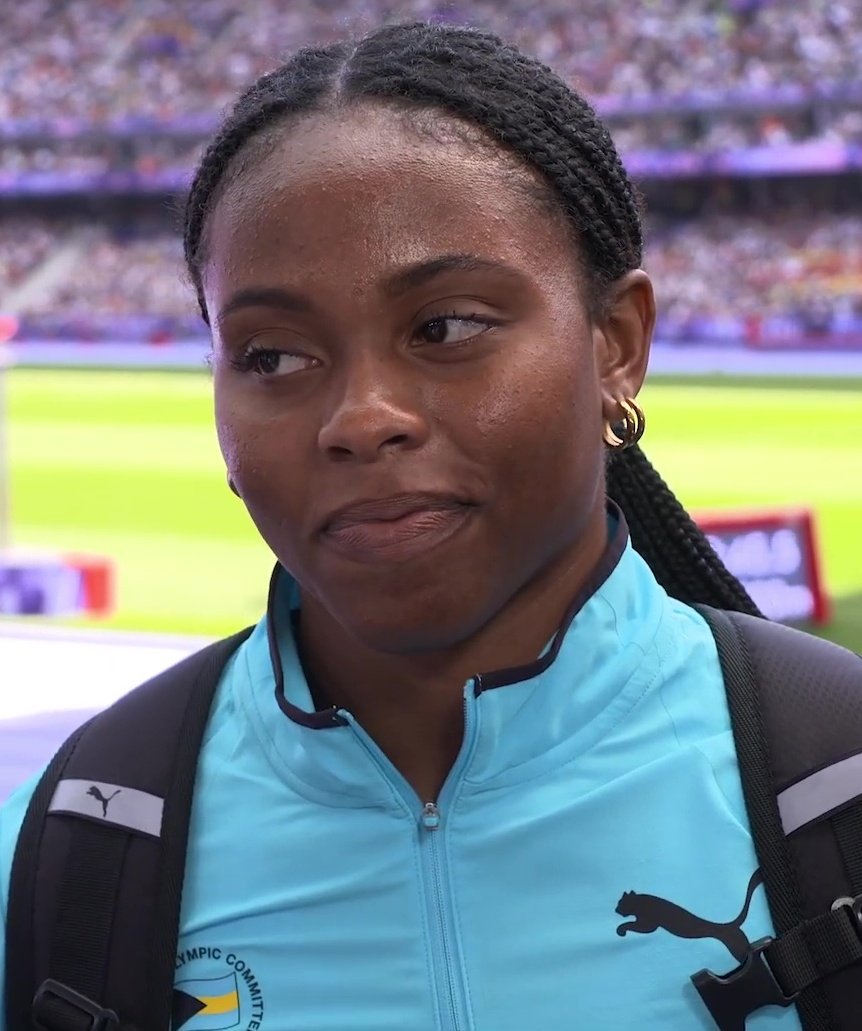

Personal information
- Nationality: Bahamas
- Born: 3 December 2002 (age 23)

Sport
- Sport: Athletics
- Event: Javelin

Achievements and titles
- Personal bests: Javelin: 64.19 (Eugene, 2024)
Medal record
Women's Athletics
Representing Bahamas
Pan American Games
Silver medal – second place	2023 Santiago	Javelin throw
NACAC Championships
Bronze medal – third place	2022 Freeport	Javelin throw
Bronze medal – third place	2025 Freeport	Javelin throw
NACAC U23 Championships
Gold medal – first place	2023 San Jose	Javelin
NACAC U20 Championships
Gold medal – first place	2021 San Jose	Javelin

Rhema Otabor (born 3 December 2002) is a javelin thrower from the Bahamas. She was the silver medalist at the 2023 Pan American Games.

== Early life ==
From Nassau, Bahamas, she attended Florida International University and the University of Nebraska–Lincoln in the United States.

== Career ==
She won gold representing Bahamas at the 2021 NACAC U20 Championships in San Jose, Costa Rica with a personal best of 55.06m. in August 2021, she finished fourth at the 2021 World Athletics U20 Championships in Nairobi, where set a new Bahamian junior national record and a personal best with a throw of 55.08 metres.

She won bronze at the senior 2022 NACAC Championships in Freeport, Bahamas in August 2022 with a throw of 57.91 metres. In June 2023, she won the NCAA Championship Division 1 javelin competition in Austin, Texas.

She won gold at the 2023 NACAC U23 Championships in San Jose, Costa Rica in July 2023, and threw a personal best 59.75m at the Bahamas National Championships. She competed at the 2023 World Athletics Championships in Budapest but did not qualify for the final. She was a silver medalist at the 2023 Pan American Games in Santiago in October 2023.

She set a new personal best of 64.19 to win the 2024 NCAA Championships in Eugene, Oregon. It also broke the collegiate javelin record of 62.19m set in 2016 by Maggie Malone. She competed in the javelin at the 2024 Summer Olympics in Paris in August 2024.

She competed at the 2025 NACAC Championships in Freeport, the Bahamas, winning the bronze medal with a throw of 53.70 metres. She competed at the 2025 World Athletics Championships in Tokyo, Japan, throwing 60.06 metres without advancing to the final. In the same stadium in May 2026, she won the javelin throw at the Golden Grand Prix in Tokyo. She placed fifth in the javelin throw at the 2026 Commonwealth Games in Glasgow, Scotland.
