= Jenna Rogers =

American high jumper (born 2002)

Personal information
- Born: 18 April 2002 (age 24)

Sport
- Sport: Athletics
- Event: High jump

Achievements and titles
- Personal best: High jump: 1.94 m (2025)
Medal record
Women's athletics
Representing United States
NACAC U23 Championships
Gold medal – first place	2023 San Jose	High jump

Jenna Rogers (born 18 April 2002) is an American high jumper.

== Biography ==
From Rutherford, New Jersey, Rogers attended Rutherford High School and began the high jump at a regional youth track meet when she was 11 years-old, but also played volleyball alongside track and field.

Rogers won the New Balance Nationals as a freshman in June 2017, where she set a national freshman record, Bergen County record, and New Jersey state record. She later competed with professionals for the first time at the Millrose Games in 2018 before her senior high school season was halted by the Covid-19 Pandemic. She attended the University of Nebraska–Lincoln, where she completed a Master's degree in Speech Pathalogy and was coached in high jump by former Olympian Dusty Jonas.

Rogers was a gold medalist at the 2023 NACAC U23 Championships in San Jose, Costa Rica. She set a new personal best of 1.91 metres at the US Olympic Trials in June 2024, before losing out in the jump-off to Vashti Cunningham for bronze.

Competing during the 2025 indoor season at the Mark Colligan Memorial, Rogers set a new Nebraska school record when she cleared 1.94 metres. She won the Indoor Big Ten Championships with a meeting record in February 2025. Rogers also finished third at the 2025 USA Indoor Track and Field Championships in New York, later that month. Having won her fifth Big Ten Championships, Rogers finished her collegiate availability with a third place finish at the NCAA Outdoor Championships in June 2025 in Eugene, Oregon, clearing 1.90m. She finished her Nebraska career with sixth First-Team All-America and the Nebraska college records both indoors and outdoors. Rogers placed fifth at the 2025 USA Outdoor Track and Field Championships in Eugene, Oregon on 1 August 2025, with a jump of 1.88 metres.

== Personal life ==
With support from the University of Nebraska athletic department and track team, Rogers started "Everybody Plays", a track and field mini-camp for children with special educational needs in Lincoln, Nebraska.
