= 2023 NACAC U18 and U23 Championships in Athletics =

Sports competition in North America

NACAC U23 & U18 Championships
- Organisers: World Athletics, North American, Central American and Caribbean Athletic Association
- Edition: 12th
- Dates: 21–23 July
- Host city: San José, Costa Rica
- Venue: Estadio Nacional de Costa Rica
- Level: Under 23; Under 18
- Type: Outdoor
- Events: 88
- Participation: 31 nations
- Official website: NACAC U18 & U23 Championship July 21 - 23, 2023 Estadio Nacional, San José, CRC

The 2023 NACAC U23 & U18 Championships, the twelfth edition of the biennial athletics competition between North American, Central American and Caribbean Athletic Association at NACAC U23 Championships in Athletics for athletes under the age of twenty-three and third edition of NACAC U18 Championships in Athletics for athletes under the age of eighteen.

The 2023 NACAC U23 & U18 Championships were organized by World Athletics and North America, Central America and Caribbean Athletic Association and were held 21–23 July 2023 in San José, Costa Rica, North America.

== Results ==
=== U23 Men ===
==== U23 Track ====
Chronology: 2019 | 2021 | 2023 | 2025 | 2027

Event	Gold		Silver		Bronze	
100 metres (wind: +1.7 m/s)	Adrian Kerr; Jamaica	10.08	Travis Williams; Jamaica	10.12	Diego González; Puerto Rico	10.22
200 metres (wind: +1.7 m/s)	Callum Robinson; Canada	20.52	Demar Francis; Jamaica	20.67	Connor Washington; United States	20.74
400 metres	D'Andre Anderson; Jamaica	45.56	Kyle Gale; Barbados	45.80	William Jones; United States	45.95
800 metres	Handal Roban; Saint Vincent and the Grenadines	1:47.43	Sean Dolan; United States	1:47.54	Dennick Luke; Dominica	1:47.62
1500 metres	Emile Toupin; Canada	4:00.01	Hector Pagan; Puerto Rico	4:01.61	Foster Malleck; Canada	4:02.43
5000 metres	Cole Sprout; United States	14:11.78 CR	Hector Pagan; Puerto Rico	14:29.39	Esteban Oses; Costa Rica	15:33.04
110 metres hurdles (wind: +1.7 m/s)	Connor Schulman; United States	13.40	Antoine Andrews; Bahamas	13.57	Jaheem Hayles; Jamaica	13.73
400 metres hurdles	Caleb Cavanaugh; United States	49.35	Assinie Wilson; Jamaica	49.70	Yeral Núñez; Dominican Republic	49.95
3000 metres steeplechase	Kevin Robertson; Canada	9:04.77	Paulo Gómez; Costa Rica	9:10.48	Carson Williams; United States	9:30.66
4 × 100 metres relay	Jamaica; Jehlani Gordon; Adrian Kerr; Travis Williams; Shakur Williams	39.04	Bahamas; Antoine Andrews; Adam Musgrove; Carlos Brown Jr. Terrence Jones	39.59	United States; Blaise Atkinson; Brice Chabot; Rodney Heath; Samuel Blaskowski	39.62
4 × 400 metres relay	Jamaica; Assinie Wilson; Reheem Hayles; Delano Kennedy; D'Andre Anderson	3:02.44	United States; William Jones; Caleb Cavanaugh; Connor Washington; Will Sumner	3:04.84	Barbados; Raheem Taitt; Jahleel Armstrong; Kyle Gale; Tyrique Johnson	3:04.33
10 kilometres walk†	José Mariano Ordóñez; Guatemala	44:55.05	Samuel Allen; United States	49:26.82	Only two starters	
WR world record | AR area record | CR championship record | GR games record | NR national record | OR Olympic record | PB personal best | SB season best | WL world leading (in a given season)

* Indicates the athletes only competed in the preliminary heats and received medals.
† Exhibition event – no medals awarded.

==== U23 Field ====
Chronology: 2019 | 2021 | 2023 | 2025 | 2027

Event	Gold		Silver		Bronze	
High jump	Romaine Beckford; Jamaica	2.21 m	Kason O'Riley; United States	2.18 m	Shaun Miller; Bahamas	2.15 m
Pole vault	Hunter Garretson; United States	5.61 m CR	Brenden Vanderpool; Bahamas	4.95 m	Jonathan José López; Puerto Rico	4.75 m
Long jump	Malcolm Clemons; United States	8.21 m	Jeremiah Davis; United States	8.10 m (w)	Jordan Turner; Jamaica	7.82 m
Triple jump	Russell Robinson; United States	16.64 m (w)	Salif Mane; United States	16.49 m	Kelsey Daniel; Trinidad and Tobago	16.19 m (w)
Shot put	Maxwell Otterdahl; United States	19.41 m	Jason Swarens; United States	19.02 m	Christopher Crawford; Trinidad and Tobago	17.84 m
Discus throw	Ralford Mullings; Jamaica	61.18 m	Jaden James; Trinidad and Tobago	53.59 m	Aidan Elbettar; United States	53.21 m
Hammer throw	Kyle Moison; United States	64.93 m	Kade McCall; United States	64.69 m	Michael Soler; Puerto Rico	62.83 m
Javelin throw	Keyshawn Strachan; Bahamas	78.37 m	Dash Sirmon; United States	75.28 m	Braden Presser; United States	72.60 m
WR world record | AR area record | CR championship record | GR games record | NR national record | OR Olympic record | PB personal best | SB season best | WL world leading (in a given season)

==== U23 Combined ====
Chronology: 2019 | 2021 | 2023 | 2025 | 2027

Event	Gold		Silver	Bronze
Decathlon†	Guillermo Rivas; Guatemala	6815 pts	Only one starter	
WR world record | AR area record | CR championship record | GR games record | NR national record | OR Olympic record | PB personal best | SB season best | WL world leading (in a given season)

† Exhibition event – no medals awarded.

=== U23 Women ===
==== U23 Track ====
Chronology: 2019 | 2021 | 2023 | 2025 | 2027

Event	Gold		Silver		Bronze	
100 metres (wind: +0.7 m/s)	Mia Brahe-Pedersen; United States	11.08 CR	Leah Bertrand; Trinidad and Tobago	11.27	Beyoncé Defreitas; British Virgin Islands	11.41
200 metres (wind: +0.1 m/s)	Mia Brahe-Pedersen; United States	23.05	Beyoncé Defreitas; British Virgin Islands	23.59	Ashantai Bollers; Canada	23.84
400 metres	Jermaisha Arnold; United States	50.68 CR	Ziyah Holman; United States	50.95	Shana-Kaye Anderson; Jamaica	52.27
800 metres	Olivia Cooper; Canada	2:07.59	Cassandra Williamson; Canada	2:07.83	Mikaela Smith; United States Virgin Islands	2:12.80
1500 metres	Addison Wiley; United States	4:05.84 CR	Elise Shea; United States	4:14.90	Holly MacGillivray; Canada	4:15.99
5000 metres	Layla Roebke; United States	17:24.61	Jorelis Vargas; Puerto Rico	17:56.56	Yuliannie Lugo; Puerto Rico	18:05.18
100 metres hurdles (wind: -0.2 m/s)	Rayniah Jones; United States	12.78	Crystal Morrison; Jamaica	12.81	Destiny Huven; United States	13.19
400 metres hurdles	Shani'a Bellamy; United States	55.48	Vanessa Watson; United States	56.05	Garriel White; Jamaica	56.94
4 × 100 metres relay	United States; Kaila Jackson; Rayniah Jones; Sophia Beckmon; Mia Brahe-Pedersen	42.74 CR	Jamaica; Crystal Morrison; Shaqueena Foote; Niesha Burgher; Shana-Kaye Anderson	43.80	Trinidad and Tobago; Reneisha Andrews; Shaniqua Bascombe; Taejha Badal; Leah Bertrand	44.50
4 × 400 metres relay	United States; Ziyah Holman; Kiah Williams; Jan'taijah Ford; Jermaisha Arnold	3:26.83 CR	Jamaica; Garriel White; Shaqueena Foote; Joanne Reid; Shana-Kaye Anderson	3:28.50	Costa Rica; Naydelin Calderón; Tiphanny Madrigal; Vielka Arias; Melanie Vargas	4:09.81
5000 metres walk†	María Fernanda Peinado; Guatemala	23:22.65	Glendy Teletor; Guatemala	24:00.01	Only two starters	
WR world record | AR area record | CR championship record | GR games record | NR national record | OR Olympic record | PB personal best | SB season best | WL world leading (in a given season)

* Indicates the athletes only competed in the preliminary heats and received medals.
† Exhibition event – no medals awarded.

==== U23 Field ====
Chronology: 2019 | 2021 | 2023 | 2025 | 2027

Event	Gold		Silver		Bronze	
High jump†	Jenna Rogers; United States	1.83 m	María José Rodríguez; Costa Rica	1.70 m	Only two starters	
Pole vault	Sydney Horn; United States	4.41 m CR	Heather Abadie; Canada	3.95 m	Vielka Paola Arias Mora; Costa Rica	3.55 m
Long jump	Sophia Beckmon; United States	6.69 m (w)	Claire Bryant; United States	6.66 m (w)	Haila González; Cuba	6.41 m (w)
Triple jump	Rhianna Phillips; Jamaica	13.61 m	Euphenie Andre; United States	13.42 m (w)	Asherah Collins; United States	13.04 m
Shot put	Jaida Ross; United States	18.35 m	Jalani Davis; United States	17.20 m	Danielle Sloley; Jamaica	16.23 m
Discus throw	Melany Matheus; Cuba	59.60 m	Shelby Frank; United States	56.96 m	Michaelle Valentin; Haiti	51.62 m
Hammer throw	Jalani Davis; United States	63.81 m	Yanielys Torres; Puerto Rico	58.81 m	Michaelle Valentin; Haiti	57.51 m
Javelin throw	Rhema Otabor; Bahamas	57.48 m CR	Maura Huwalt; United States	49.25 m	Kimberly Smith; British Virgin Islands	37.54 m
WR world record | AR area record | CR championship record | GR games record | NR national record | OR Olympic record | PB personal best | SB season best | WL world leading (in a given season)

† Exhibition event – no medals awarded.

==== U23 Combined ====
Chronology: 2019 | 2021 | 2023 | 2025 | 2027

Event	Gold		Silver		Bronze
Heptathlon†	Jadin O'Brien; United States	5778 pts	Shaunece Miller; Bahamas	4291 pts	Only two starters
WR world record | AR area record | CR championship record | GR games record | NR national record | OR Olympic record | PB personal best | SB season best | WL world leading (in a given season)

† Exhibition event – no medals awarded.

=== U23 Mixed ===
Chronology: 2019 | 2021 | 2023 | 2025 | 2027

Event	Gold		Silver		Bronze	
4 × 400 metres relay	United States; Caleb Cavanaugh; Kiah Williams; Will Sumner; Bailey Lear	3:14.71 CR	Jamaica; Gregory Prince; Shaquena Foote; Enrique Webster; Garriel White	3:19.66	Canada; Abdullahi Hassan; Olivia Cooper; Leroy Russell; Cassandra Williamson	3:25.42

=== U18 Boys ===
==== U18 Track ====
Chronology: 2019 | 2021 | 2023 | 2025 | 2027

Event	Gold		Silver		Bronze	
100 metres (wind: -1.0 m/s)	Kasiya Daley; Antigua and Barbuda	10.56	Gary Card; Jamaica	10.56	Dwayne Fleming; Antigua and Barbuda	10.69
200 metres (wind: -0.9 m/s)	Kasiya Daley; Antigua and Barbuda	21.40	Ainsley McGregor; Jamaica	21.70	Cayden Smith; Bahamas	21.76
400 metres	Zion Miller; Bahamas	48.08	Joshua Wint; Jamaica	48.68	Zion Shepherd; Bahamas	49.10
800 metres	Robin Lefebvre; Canada	1:52.80	LJ Nelson; Canada	1:54.36	Daniel Aguilar; Guatemala	1:55.17
1500 metres	Robin Lefebvre; Canada	3:58.47	Jackson Witham; Canada	3:59.41	Asher Leo Patel; Aruba	4:04.28 NR
3000 metres	Asher Leo Patel; Aruba	9:13.47 NR	David Jiang; Canada	9:14.30	Omare Thompson; Trinidad and Tobago	9:34.94
110 metres hurdles (91.4 cm) (wind: -0.4 m/s)	Daneil Wright; Jamaica	13.31	Kahiem Carby; Jamaica	13.34	Yander Herrera; Cuba	13.41
400 metres hurdles	Trevoy Smith; Jamaica	51.75 CR	Cheyne West; Trinidad and Tobago	52.35	Berkley Munnings; Bahamas	54.27
2000 metres steeplechase†	Jean Carlos Soza; Nicaragua	6:23.09	Derek Strachan; Canada	6:26.97	Only two starters	
4 × 100 metres relay	Trinidad and Tobago; Khadeem Ryan; Kadeem Chinapoo; Trevaughn Stewart; Andrew Steele	41.14	Jamaica; Kahiem Carby; Trevoy Smith; Ainsley McGregor; Joshua Wint	41.18	Bahamas; Johnathon Rodgers; Cayden Smith; Trent Ford; Ishmael Rolle	41.19
4 × 400 metres relay	Jamaica; Joshua Wint; Daneil Wright; Jabari Matheson; Trevoy Smith	3:12.80	Bahamas; Berkley Munnings; Zion Shepherd; Morgan Moss; Zion Miller	3:19.80	Trinidad and Tobago; Khadeem Ryan; Cheyne West; Kaleb Campbell; Keeran Sriskandarajah	3:26.81
WR world record | AR area record | CR championship record | GR games record | NR national record | OR Olympic record | PB personal best | SB season best | WL world leading (in a given season)

* Indicates the athletes only competed in the preliminary heats and received medals.
†Exhibition event

==== U18 Field ====
Chronology: 2019 | 2021 | 2023 | 2025 | 2027

Event	Gold		Silver		Bronze	
High jump	Chavez Penn; Jamaica	2.10 m	Andrew Stone; Cayman Islands	2.07 m	Jaidi James; Trinidad and Tobago	1.95 m
Pole vault†	Kenny Moxey Jr. Bahamas	3.90 m	Leonardo Oliveros; Guatemala	3.45 m	Only two starters	
Long jump	Chavez Penn; Jamaica	2.10 m	Andrew Stone; Cayman Islands	2.07 m	Jaidi James; Trinidad and Tobago	1.95 m
Triple jump	Immani Mathew; Trinidad and Tobago	7.71 m	Andrew Stone; Cayman Islands	7.36 m	Andrew Steele; Trinidad and Tobago	7.30 m (w)
Shot put (5 kg)	Ángel Montanez; Puerto Rico	15.54 m	Jordy Soto; Costa Rica	11.98 m	Only two starters	
Discus throw (1.5 kg)	José Sebastián Albizu; Guatemala	41.62 m	Anthony Gómez; Costa Rica	40.93 m	Only two starters	
Hammer throw† (5 kg)	Juan David Contreras; Guatemala	42.48 m	Anthony Gómez; Costa Rica	35.21 m	Only two starters	
Javelin throw (700 g)	Malique Francis; Antigua and Barbuda	56.18 m	Wilson Morales; Guatemala	51.70 m	Only two starters	
WR world record | AR area record | CR championship record | GR games record | NR national record | OR Olympic record | PB personal best | SB season best | WL world leading (in a given season)

†Exhibition event

==== U18 Combined ====
Chronology: 2019 | 2021 | 2023 | 2025 | 2027

Event	Gold		Silver		Bronze
Decathlon (U18)	Kenny Moxey Jr. Bahamas	6095 pts	Maxwell Álvarez; Guatemala	5528 pts	Exhibition event
WR world record | AR area record | CR championship record | GR games record | NR national record | OR Olympic record | PB personal best | SB season best | WL world leading (in a given season)

=== U18 Girls ===
==== U18 Track ====
Chronology: 2019 | 2021 | 2023 | 2025 | 2027

Event	Gold		Silver		Bronze	
100 metres (wind: +1.2 m/s)	Theianna Terrelonge; Jamaica	11.41	Frances Colón; Puerto Rico	11.50	La'Nica Locker; Antigua and Barbuda	11.54
200 metres (wind: -0.9 m/s)	Theianna Terrelonge; Jamaica	23.53	La'Nica Locker; Antigua and Barbuda	23.64	Frances Colón; Puerto Rico	24.08
400 metres	Chloe Symon; Canada	55.37	Akira Malaver; Trinidad and Tobago	55.77	Breanne Barnett; Haiti	56.01
800 metres	Michelle Smith; U.S. Virgin Islands	2:09.90	Stephanie Bertram; Canada	2:10.88	Gabriella Ruggeri; Canada	2:12.04
1500 metres	Abby Lewis; Canada	4:35.01 CR	Stephanie Bertram; Canada	4:37.97	Ashlyn Simmons; Barbados	4:49.18
3000 metres	Abby Lewis; Canada	10:01.67 CR	Karla Rodas; Guatemala	11:22.26	María Paula Leiva; Costa Rica	11:58.96
100 metres hurdles (76.2 cm) (wind: +0.1 m/s)	Naomi Byam; Canada	13.77	Michelle Smith; U.S. Virgin Islands	13.88	Sofia Swindell; U.S. Virgin Islands	14.01
400 metres hurdles	Michelle Smith; U.S. Virgin Islands	56.99 CR	Darvinique Dean; Bahamas	61.13	Keneisha Shelbourne; Trinidad and Tobago	61.68
4 × 100 metres relay	Trinidad and Tobago; Symphony Patrick; Janae De Gannes; Gianna Paul; Akira Malaver	45.99	Bahamas; Phebe Thompson; Shatalya Dorsett; Nia Richards; Shayann Demeritte	46.42	Puerto Rico; Legna Echevarría; Frances Colón; Darelys Dominguez; Karina Franceschi	46.49
4 × 400 metres relay	Canada; Naomi Byam; Stryker Zablocki; Gracy Smith; Chloe Symon	3:49.97	Bahamas; Darvinique Dean; Shatalya Dorsett; Nya Wright; Alexis Roberts	3:51.20	Costa Rica; Elineth Navarro; Victoria Jara; Antonella Lanuza; Mariangel Núñez	4:08.98
10 kilometres walk	María José González; Guatemala	25:41.65	Chelsea Araya; Costa Rica	27:33.57	Keesha Vázquez; Puerto Rico	29:07.76
WR world record | AR area record | CR championship record | GR games record | NR national record | OR Olympic record | PB personal best | SB season best | WL world leading (in a given season)

* Indicates the athletes only competed in the preliminary heats and received medals.

==== U18 Field ====
Chronology: 2019 | 2021 | 2023 | 2025 | 2027

Event	Gold		Silver		Bronze	
High jump	Jah'kyla Morton; British Virgin Islands	1.74 m	Keneisha Shelbourne; Trinidad and Tobago	1.71 m	Koi Adderley; Bahamas	1.65 m
Long jump	Janae De Gannes; Trinidad and Tobago	6.11 m CR	Legna Echevarría; Puerto Rico	6.08 m (w)	Brooklyn Lyttle; Belize	5.72 m (w)
Triple jump	Asia Phillips; Canada	13.55 m	Jaeda Robinson; Jamaica	12.14 m	Brooklyn Lyttle; Belize	11.65 m (w)
Shot put (wind: 3 kg)	Peyton Winter; Trinidad and Tobago	14.53 m	Annae Mackey; Bahamas	13.09 m	Mikayla Brown; Cayman Islands	12.65 m
Discus throw	Cailyn Johnson; Bahamas	40.85 m	Ruth Irvine; Trinidad and Tobago	33.82 m	Luna Mora; Costa Rica	32.76 m
Javelin throw	Ciara Marie Martínez; Puerto Rico	44.94 m	Dior Rae Scott; Bahamas	41.39 m	Taysha Stubbs; Bahamas	40.68 m
WR world record | AR area record | CR championship record | GR games record | NR national record | OR Olympic record | PB personal best | SB season best | WL world leading (in a given season)

==== U18 Combined ====
Chronology: 2019 | 2021 | 2023 | 2025 | 2027

Event	Gold		Silver		Bronze	
Heptathlon (U18)	Gianna Paul; Trinidad and Tobago	4618 pts	Tenique Vincent; Trinidad and Tobago	4600 pts	Mariangel Núñez; Costa Rica	4069 pts
WR world record | AR area record | CR championship record | GR games record | NR national record | OR Olympic record | PB personal best | SB season best | WL world leading (in a given season)

=== U18 Mixed ===
Chronology: 2019 | 2021 | 2023 | 2025 | 2027

Event	Gold		Silver		Bronze	
4 × 400 metres relay	Bahamas; Zion Miller; Nya Wright; Zion Shepherd; Alexis Roberts	3:31.29	Canada; Robin Lefebvre; Stephanie Bertram; LJ Nelson; Gabriella Ruggeri	3:31.96	Trinidad and Tobago; Kyle Williams; Akira Malaver; Keeran Sriskandarajah; Keneisha Shelbourne	3:33.13

== Participating nations ==
According to an official count, 448 athletes from 28 countries participated.

- Anguilla (3)
- Antigua and Barbuda (6)
- Aruba (1)
- Bahamas (48)
- Barbados (13)
- Belize (5)
- Bermuda (6)
- British Virgin Islands (9)
- Canada (40)
- Cayman Islands (7)
- Costa Rica (46)
- Cuba (4)
- Dominica (4)
- Dominican Republic (5)
- El Salvador (6)
- Grenada (1)
- Guatemala (20)
- Haiti (5)
- Honduras (1)
- Jamaica (69)
- Montserrat (1)
- Nicaragua (4)
- Puerto Rico (25)
- Saint Vincent and the Grenadines (6)
- Trinidad and Tobago (38)
- Turks and Caicos Islands (5)
- United States (62)
- United States Virgin Islands (5)
