= Malcolm Clemons =

Olympian Athlete (born 2002)

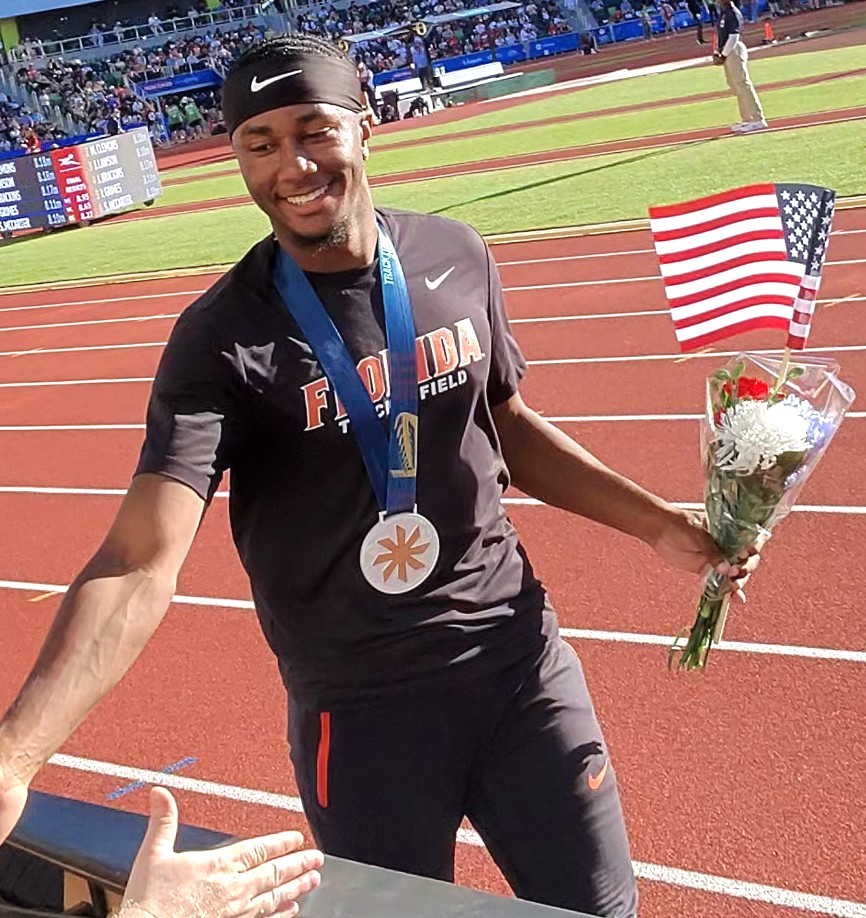
- Clemons at the 2024 United States Olympic trials

Personal information
- Nationality: American
- Born: March 8, 2002 (age 24) Oakland, California

Sport
- Sport: Athletics
- Event: Long jump

Achievements and titles
- Personal bests: Long jump: 8.22m (Fayetteville, 2023)
Medal record
Men's athletics
Representing United States
NACAC U23 Championships
Gold medal – first place	2023 San Jose	Long jump

Malcolm Clemons (born March 8, 2002) is an American long jumper. He represented the United States at the 2024 Olympic Games and won the 2025 NCAA Outdoor Championships competing for the University of Florida.

== Early and personal life ==
From East Oakland, California, Clemons began track and field with the Oakland Police Activity League when he was five years-old. He attended Ecole Bilingue de Berkeley in Berkeley, California, where he was became fluent in the French language. He moved to Richmond, California in 2017 and enrolled in Saint Mary's College High School in Berkeley, California before attending and graduating high school from IMG Academy in Bradenton, Florida, in 2020. Clemons was recruited by the University of Florida in 2020. He was coached by Nic Petersen and graduated in 2024 with a Bachelor of Science in International Studies.

== Career ==
Clemons placed second in the long jump at the 2018 New Balance Outdoor Championships. The following year, he won the 2018 CIF High School State Championships in the long Jump while a student at Saint Mary's College High School in California. Competing at the 2019 USATF Region 16 and National Junior Olympics, he had a third place finish in the long jump.

Competing for the United States, he was a gold medalist at the NACAC U23 Championships in San Jose, Costa Rica in July 2023. Clemons finished third in the long jump at the NCAA Indoor Championships in Boston, Massachusetts in March 2024. He placed third in the long jump at the 2024 NCAA Outdoor Championships in Eugene, Oregon in June 2024. Later that month, he was runner-up in the long jump at the 2024 United States Olympic trials with a distance of 8.18 metres. He subsequently competed in the long jump at the 2024 Paris Olympics, without advancing to the final.

In June 2025, while competing for the University of Florida, he won the 2025 NCAA Championships title in Eugene, Oregon, with a winning jump of 8.04 metres.

Clemons competed in the long jump at the 2026 USA Indoor Track and Field Championships in New York, placing fourth overall. On 23 July 2026, he had a best jump of 8.07 metres and finished runner-up as Isaac Grimes retained the national title at the 2026 USA Outdoor Track and Field Championships in New York.
