= Jalani Davis =

American athlete (born 2001)

Personal information
- Born: 23 May 2001 (age 25)
- Home town: Hampton, Virginia, U.S.

Sport
- Country: United States
- Sport: Athletics (track and field)
- Events: Shot put; Hammer throw; Weight throw

Achievements and titles
- Personal best(s): Shot put 18.64 (Nashville, 2023); Hammer throw 69.53 (Eugene, 2022); Weight throw: 25.09 (Fayetteville, 2024)
Medal record
Women's athletics
Representing United States
NACAC U23 Championships
| Gold medal – first place | 2023 San Jose | Hammer throw |
| Silver medal – second place | 2023 San Jose | Shot put |

Jalani Davis (born 23 May 2001) is an American track and field athlete who competes in the shot put, hammer throw and weight throw. She won the weight throw title at the 2026 USA Indoor Track and Field Championships.

== Early life and education ==
Davis grew up in Hampton, Virginia. She is a graduate of Bethel High School and competed for the University of Mississippi.

== Career ==
Davis finished first in the women's weight throw final at the 2023 NCAA Indoor Championships in Albuquerque, New Mexico.

Davis won the hammer throw and won silver in the shot put at the 2023 NACAC U20 Championships in San Jose, Costa Rica. She was subsequently selected for the 2023 World Athletics Championships in Budapest to compete in the shot put.

In February 2024, she won the SEC Championship weight throw competition with a distance of 25.09 m (82 ft 3 3/4 in), making her just third college athlete to ever throw over 25 meters and placing her ninth on the all-time world list. In March 2024, she retained her weight throw title at the 2024 NCAA Indoor Championships in Boston, Massachusetts.

At the 2025 USA Indoor Championships, Davis placed eighth in shot put with a throw of 16.73 m (54 ft 10 1/2 in).

Davis threw 25.47m in the weight throw at the Tyson Invitational in Fayetteville, Arkansas on 13 February 2026 to move to eighth on the all-time world list. On 1 March, she won the weight throw by over seven foot at the 2026 USA Indoor Track and Field Championships, with all three of her throws sufficient to have won the title.
