= Nick Christie =

American racewalker (born 1991)

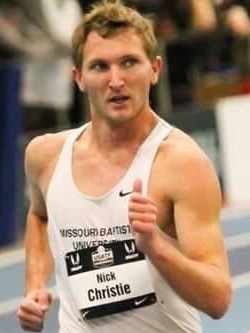

Personal information
- Born: Nicholas Steven Christie; September 29, 1991 (age 34) Fairfield, California, U.S.

Sport
- Country: United States
- Sport: Racewalking
Medal record
Men's athletics
Representing United States
NACAC Championships
Bronze medal – third place	2025 Freeport	20,000 m walk

Nicholas Steven "Nick" Christie (born September 29, 1991) is an American racewalker. Christie is a multiple time National Champion at the NAIA level and has been the US National Champion for the indoor 3000m Racewalk. He has competed internationally for the US many times since 2012 and at the national level many times as well. As of 2013 he is one of the many rising stars that the sport has in the United States as it gains popularity in the nation. He is also the current national record holder for the National Association of Intercollegiate Athletics in the Indoor 3000m racewalk with a time of 11:46.20.

== History ==
Christie began competing at the collegiate level of Track and Field after graduating from Grossmont High School while at Cuyamaca College in Rancho San Diego, CA where he was initially a decathlete. He was introduced to racewalking by the Cross Country coach at Cuyamaca, Tim Seaman. He quickly picked up the sport and began competing at the national and international levels almost immediately. From there, he transferred to Missouri Baptist University in St. Louis, Missouri under the direction of coach Tish Hanna and to join NAIA standouts and rising US stars Alex Chavez and Molly Josephs.

== Major competition ==
- 2015 US National Championship 50 km Racewalk, November 22, 2016, Santee, CA--4:11:48, 4th
- 2015 USATF Outdoor Championships 20 km, June 27, 2015, Eugene, OR--1:30:51.69, 2nd
- Pan American Racewalking Cup 20 km, May 9, 2015, Arica, Chile--1:35:04, 27th
- 2014 USATF Outdoor Championships 20 km, June 30, 2014, Sacramento, CA--1:29:26.68, 3rd
- IAAF World Racewalking Cup 2014 20 km, May 4, 2014, Taicang, China--1:32:19, 91st
- NACAC U23 20 km, July 7, 2012, Iripuato, Mexico--1:33:45.85, 4th
- 2012 U.S. Olympic Trials 20 km, June 30, 2012, Eugene, OR--1:29"47.30, 3rd
- IAAF World Racewalking Cup 2012 20 km, May 12, 2012, Saransk, Russia--1:41:48, 100th

== Personal bests ==
- 1 Mile Racewalk--5:52.93
- 3 km Racewalk--11:46.20
- 5 km Racewalk--20:53
- 10 km Racewalk--43:05.53
- 20 km Racewalk--1:22:44
- 35 km Racewalk--2:38:16
- 50 km Racewalk--4:11:48
