= 2025 USA Outdoor Track and Field Championships =

- Dates: July 31–August 3, 2025
- Host city: Eugene, Oregon, United States
- Venue: Hayward Field
- Level: Senior, Junior
- Type: Outdoor
- Events: 44 (men: 22; women: 22)

The 2025 USA Outdoor Track and Field Championships were held at Hayward Field in Eugene, Oregon from July 31 to August 3, 2025. They served as USA Track & Field's (USATF) national championships in track and field for the United States. The results of the event determined qualification for the September 13–21, 2025 World Athletics Championships held in Tokyo, Japan. Provided they achieved the World standard or were in the World Athletics ranking quota, the top three athletes in each event gained a place on the Team USA World team. In the event that a leading athlete did not hold the standard (or an athlete withdraws) the next-highest-finishing athlete with the standard was selected instead. USATF is expected to announce their World Championship roster based on these guidelines in August 2025.

== Men's results ==
=== Track events ===
Event	Gold		Silver		Bronze	
100 meters (Wind: (+1.8 m/s))	Kenny Bednarek	9.79 PB	Courtney Lindsey	9.82 PB	T'Mars McCallum	9.83 PB
200 meters (Wind: (+0.2 m/s))	Noah Lyles	19.63 WL	Kenny Bednarek	19.67 SB	Robert Gregory	19.80 PB
400 meters	Jacory Patterson	44.16	Chris Bailey	44.43	Khaleb McRae	44.45
800 meters	Donavan Brazier	1:42.16 CR, PB	Cooper Lutkenhaus	1:42.27 WU18B	Bryce Hoppel	1:42.49 SB
1500 meters	Ethan Strand	3:30.25 PB	Cole Hocker	3:30.37 SB	Hobbs Kessler	3:31.12 SB
5000 meters	Cole Hocker	13:26.45	Grant Fisher	13:26.75	Nico Young	13:27.05
10,000 meters	Nico Young	29:02.12	Grant Fisher	29:02.37	Graham Blanks	29:03.66
Marathon	Clayton Young	2:07:04	CJ Albertson	2:08:17	Reed Fischer	2:10:14
110 meters hurdles (Wind: (+0.7 m/s))	Ja'Kobe Tharp	13.01 PB	Cordell Tinch	13.03	Dylan Beard	13.04
400 meters hurdles	Rai Benjamin	46.89	Caleb Dean	48.45	Chris Robinson	48.56
3000 meters steeplechase	Kenneth Rooks	8:26.58	Daniel Michalski	8:26.77	Benard Keter	8:29.00
20 km walk	Nick Christie	1:24:56.2	Emmanuel Corvera	1:27:59.2	Jordan Crawford	1:28:02.6
35 km walk	Nick Christie	2:45:32	Jordan Crawford	2:46:21	Michael Mannozzi	3:03:54

==== Notes ====
- 3000 meters steeplechase-Isaac Updike, who finished 5th, will represent the US in this event, as Benard Keter has not achieved the qualifying standard nor is in the world ranking quota. Additionally, Matthew Wilkinson, who finished 4th and would have been next in line to represent the US, passed on his spot due to a broken foot incurred during these championships.
- Jonah Koech originally finished 1st in the 1500 meters but his result was disqualified due to a doping suspension.

=== Field events ===
Event	Gold		Silver		Bronze	
High jump	Tyus Wilson	2.27 m (7 ft 5 1/4 in)	Shelby McEwen JuVaughn Harrison	2.22 m (7 ft 3 1/4 in)	Not awarded	
Pole vault	Austin Miller	5.92 m (19 ft 5 in) PB	Sam Kendricks Matt Ludwig	5.72 m (18 ft 9 in)	Not awarded	
Long jump	Isaac Grimes	8.15 m (26 ft 8 3/4 in) SB (Wind: (+0.8 m/s))	Will Williams	8.14 m (26 ft 8 1/4 in) (Wind: (+2.7 m/s))	Jarrion Lawson	8.12 m (26 ft 7 1/2 in) SB (Wind: (+1.2 m/s))
Triple jump	Russell Robinson	17.15 m (56 ft 3 in) (Wind: (+0.7 m/s))	Salif Mane	17.15 m (56 ft 3 in) SB (Wind: (−0.4 m/s))	Will Claye	17.09 m (56 ft 3/4 in) SB (Wind: (+1.7 m/s))
Shot put	Josh Awotunde	22.47 m (73 ft 8 1/2 in) PB	Payton Otterdahl	22.35 m (73 ft 3 3/4 in) SB	Tripp Piperi	22.29 m (73 ft 1 1/2 in) PB
Discus throw	Reginald Jagers III	66.85 m (219 ft 3 in)	Sam Mattis	65.56 m (215 ft 1 in)	Marcus Gustaveson	64.51 m (211 ft 7 in)
Hammer throw	Rudy Winkler	81.47 m (267 ft 3 in)	Trey Knight	78.76 m (258 ft 4 in) PB	Daniel Haugh	77.28 m (253 ft 6 in)
Javelin throw	Curtis Thompson	83.89 m (275 ft 2 in)	Dash Sirmon	77.28 m (253 ft 6 in)	Marc Minichello	76.81 m (252 ft 0 in)
Decathlon	Kyle Garland	8869 pts PB	Heath Baldwin	8407 pts	Harrison Williams	8223 pts

== Women's results ==
=== Track events ===
Event	Gold		Silver		Bronze	
100 meters (Wind: (+0.4 m/s))	Melissa Jefferson-Wooden	10.65 WL, PB	Kayla White	10.84 PB	Aleia Hobbs	10.92
200 meters (Wind: (+0.5 m/s))	Melissa Jefferson-Wooden	21.84 PB	Anavia Battle	22.13 SB	Gabrielle Thomas	22.20
400 meters	Sydney McLaughlin-Levrone	48.90 SB	Isabella Whittaker	49.59	Aaliyah Butler	49.91
800 meters	Roisin Willis	1:59.26	Maggi Congdon	1:59.39	Sage Hurta-Klecker	1:59.48
1500 meters	Nikki Hiltz	4:03.15	Sinclaire Johnson	4:03.77	Emily Mackay	4:04.38
5000 meters	Shelby Houlihan	15:13.61	Elise Cranny	15:14.26	Josette Andrews	15:15.01
10,000 meters	Emily Infeld	31:43.56	Elise Cranny	31:44.24	Taylor Roe	31:45.41
Marathon	Susanna Sullivan	2:21:56	Erika Kemp	2:22:56	Jessica McClain	2:22:43
100 meters hurdles (Wind: (+0.7 m/s))	Masai Russell	12.22	Grace Stark	12.31	Alaysha Johnson	12.36
400 meters hurdles	Dalilah Muhammad	52.65	Anna Cockrell	52.89 SB	Jasmine Jones	53.23
3000 meters steeplechase	Lexy Halladay-Lowry	9:09.14	Angelina Napoleon	9:10.96	Kaylee Mitchell	9:11.36
20 km walk	Lauren Harris	1:31:23.7	Maria Michta-Coffey	1:39:56.8	Katie Burnett	1:40:35.2
35 km walk	Katie Burnett	3:05:12	Miranda Melville	3:05:55	Maria Michta-Coffey	3:10:01

=== Field events ===
Event	Gold		Silver		Bronze	
High jump	Vashti Cunningham	1.97 m (6 ft 5 1/2 in) SB	Sanaa Barnes	1.94 m (6 ft 4 1/4 in) PB	Emma Gates	1.91 m (6 ft 3 in) PB
Pole vault	Sandi Morris	4.83 m (15 ft 10 in) SB	Katie Moon	4.73 m (15 ft 6 in)	Amanda Moll	4.73 m (15 ft 6 in)
Long jump	Tara Davis-Woodhall	7.12 m (23 ft 4 1/4 in) WL (Wind: (+1.2 m/s))	Claire Bryant	6.97 m (22 ft 10 1/4 in) (Wind: (+2.1 m/s))	Quanesha Burks	6.90 m (22 ft 7 1/2 in) SB (Wind: (+0.7 m/s))
Triple jump	Jasmine Moore	14.68 m (48 ft 1 3/4 in) (Wind: (+1.8 m/s)) SB	Agur Dwol	13.76 m (45 ft 1 1/2 in) (Wind: (+1.9 m/s))	Euphenie Andre	13.64 m (44 ft 9 in) (Wind: (+1.2 m/s)) PB
Shot put	Chase Jackson	20.84 m (68 ft 4 1/4 in)	Maggie Ewen	19.94 m (65 ft 5 in) SB	Jessica Ramsey	19.56 m (64 ft 2 in) SB
Discus throw	Valarie Allman	71.45 m (234 ft 4 in) CR	Laulauga Tausaga	64.86 m (212 ft 9 in)	Gabi Jacobs	63.33 m (207 ft 9 in)
Hammer throw	DeAnna Price	78.53 m (257 ft 7 in) SB	Brooke Andersen	75.14 m (246 ft 6 in)	Rachel Richeson	74.57 m (244 ft 7 in)
Javelin throw	Evie Bliss	57.77 m (189 ft 6 in)	Madison Wiltrout	56.46 m (185 ft 2 in)	Sarah Blake	55.80 m (183 ft 0 in) SB
Heptathlon	Anna Hall	6899 pts	Taliyah Brooks	6526 pts PB	Allie Jones	6164 pts

== Schedule ==
Track events
Day 1—Thursday, July 31, 2025
Time (PDT)	Event	Division	Round
3:07 p.m.	800m	Men	First round
3:37 p.m.	800m	Women	First round
4:07 p.m.	100m	Women	First round
4:37 p.m.	100m	Men	First round
5:07 p.m.	3000m steeplechase	Women	First round
5:39 p.m.	3000m steeplechase	Men	First round
6:10 p.m.	1500m	Men	First round
6:32 p.m.	1500m	Women	First round
6:54 p.m.	10000m	Women	Final
8:08 p.m.	10000m	Men	Final
Day 2—Friday, August 1, 2025
Time	Event	Division	Round
3:38 p.m.	800m	Men	Semi-final
4:01 p.m.	800m	Women	Semi-final
4:24 p.m.	400m	Men	Semi-final
4:47 p.m.	400m	Women	Semi-final
5:10 p.m.	100m	Men	Semi-final
5:33 p.m.	100m	Women	Semi-final
7:17 p.m.	100m	Women	Final
7:27 p.m.	100m	Men	Final
Day 3—Saturday, August 2, 2025
Time	Event	Division	Round
7:00 a.m.	20km race walk	Women	Final
7:01 a.m.	20km race walk	Men	Final
11:22 a.m.	200m	Men	First round
11:48 a.m.	200m	Women	First round
12:14 p.m.	110m hurdles	Men	First round
12:40 p.m.	100m hurdles	Women	Semi-final
1:03 p.m.	400m	Women	Final
1:11 p.m.	400m	Men	Final
1:19 p.m.	400m hurdles	Women	Semi-final
1:41 p.m.	400m hurdles	Men	Semi-final
2:03 p.m.	1500m	Women	Final
2:14 p.m.	1500m	Men	Final
2:25 p.m.	100m hurdles	Women	Final
2:49 p.m.	3000m steeplechase	Men	Final
3:04 p.m.	3000m steeplechase	Women	Final
Day 4—Sunday, August 3, 2025
Time	Event	Division	Round
12:05 p.m.	200m	Men	Semi-final
12:32 p.m.	200m	Women	Semi-final
12:55 p.m.	110m hurdles	Men	Semi-final
1:18 p.m.	800m	Women	Final
1:26 p.m.	800m	Men	Final
1:34 p.m.	400m hurdles	Women	Final
1:43 p.m.	400m hurdles	Men	Final
1:52 p.m.	5000m	Men	Final
2:13 p.m.	200m	Women	Final
2:22 p.m.	200m	Men	Final
2:31 p.m.	5000m	Women	Final
2:54 p.m.	110m hurdles	Men	Final

Field events
Day 1—Thursday, July 31, 2025
Time	Event	Division	Round
1:20 p.m.	Javelin throw	Men	Final
1:30 p.m.	Hammer throw	Women	Final
3:30 p.m.	Javelin throw	Women	Final
4:30 p.m.	Hammer throw	Men	Final
6:00 p.m.	Long jump	Women	Final
Day 2—Friday, August 1, 2025
Time	Event	Division	Round
4:05 p.m.	High jump	Women	Final
4:10 p.m.	Long jump	Men	Final
Day 3—Saturday, August 2, 2025
Time	Event	Division	Round
11:20 a.m.	Discus throw	Men	Final
12:40 p.m.	Triple jump	Women	Final
12:45 p.m.	Shot put	Women	Final
12:50 p.m.	Pole vault	Men	Final
Day 4—Sunday, August 3, 2025
Time	Event	Division	Round
12:00 p.m.	Pole vault	Women	Final
12:00 p.m.	Discus throw	Women	Final
12:30 p.m.	Triple jump	Men	Final
12:50 p.m.	High jump	Men	Final
1:40 p.m.	Shot put	Men	Final

Heptathlon
Day 1—Thursday, July 31, 2025
Time	Event	Division	Round
11:00 a.m.	100m hurdles	Women	Heptathlon final
12:15 p.m.	High jump	Women	Heptathlon final
6:20 p.m.	Shot put	Women	Heptathlon final
7:36 p.m.	200m	Women	Heptathlon final
Day 2—Friday, August 1, 2025
Time	Event	Division	Round
2:00 p.m.	Long jump	Women	Heptathlon final
4:05 p.m.	Javelin	Women	Heptathlon final
5:55 p.m.	800m	Women	Heptathlon final

Decathlon
Day 1—Thursday, July 31, 2025
Time	Event	Division	Round
10:30 a.m.	100m	Men	Decathlon final
11:20 a.m.	Long jump	Men	Decathlon final
12:20 p.m.	Shot put	Men	Decathlon final
5:45 p.m.	High jump	Men	Decathlon final
7:52 p.m.	400m	Men	Decathlon final
Day 2—Friday, August 1, 2025
Time	Event	Division	Round
11:30 a.m.	110m hurdles	Men	Decathlon final
12:25 p.m.	Discus throw	Men	Decathlon final
2:05 p.m.	Pole vault	Men	Decathlon final
5:25 p.m.	Javelin throw	Men	Decathlon final
7:06 p.m.	1500m	Men	Decathlon final

== Automatic selections ==
The following are eligible for automatic selection by Team USA to the 2025 World Athletics Championships.

2023 World Athletics Championships champions
Men

- Noah Lyles - 100 meters
- Noah Lyles - 200 meters
- Grant Holloway - 110 meters hurdles
- Ryan Crouser - shot put

Women

- Sha'Carri Richardson - 100 meters
- Katie Moon - pole vault
- Chase Ealey - shot put
- Laulauga Tausaga - discus

2025 Diamond League champions

- Brittany Brown - 200 meters

2024 World Athletics Combined Events Challenge winner

- Michelle Atherley - heptathlon

== 2025 USA qualification standards ==
All qualifying performances for the Championships must be attained during the following time periods:

- 20 km race walk: Monday, January 1, 2024 - Sunday, July 20, 2025
- 10,000 meters & combined events: Monday, February 5, 2024 – Sunday, July 20, 2025
- All other events: Friday, June 21, 2024 – Sunday, July 20, 2025

Event	Men's standard	Women's standard	Max entrants	Rounds
100 m	10.05	11.07	32	3
200 m	20.30	22.57	32	3
400 m	45.20	51.00	32	3
800 m	1:45.60	2:00.50	32	3
1500 m	3:35.00 mile 3:52.00	4:06.00 mile 4:25.00	36	2
5000 m	13:12.00	15:05.00	24	1
10,000 m	27:45.00	31:30.00	24	1
20,000 m race walk	1:36:00; 10 km RW 46:30; 5 km RW 22:00	1:48:00; 10 km RW 51:30; 5k RW 24:30	15	1
110/100 m hurdles	13.40	12.80	32	3
400 m hurdles	49.75	56.00	32	3
3000 m steeplechase	8:27.00	9:41.00	30	2
High jump	2.26 m (7 ft 4 3/4 in)	1.88 m (6 ft 2 in)	16	1
Pole vault	5.82 m (19 ft 1 in)	4.65 m (15 ft 3 in)	16	1
Long jump	8.10 m (26 ft 6 3/4 in)	6.75 m (22 ft 1 1/2 in)	16	1
Triple jump	16.70 m (54 ft 9 1/4 in)	13.60 m (44 ft 7 1/4 in)	16	1
Shot put	21.10 m (69 ft 2 1/2 in)	19.00 m (62 ft 4 in)	16	1
Discus throw	65.00 m (213 ft 3 in)	62.00 m (203 ft 4 3/4 in)	16	1
Hammer throw	74.50 m (244 ft 5 in)	71.00 m (232 ft 11 1/4 in)	16	1
Javelin throw	78.00 m (255 ft 10 3/4 in)	57.00 m (187 ft 0 in)	16	1
Decathlon/heptathlon	8100 pts	6200 pts	16	1
