= 2025 NACAC Championships – Results =

These are the full results of the 2025 NACAC Championships which were held at the Grand Bahama Sports Complex in Freeport, Bahamas, between 15 and 17 August 2025.

== Men's results ==
=== 100 metres ===
Heats – August 15
Wind:
Heat 1: -0.8 m/s, Heat 2: -1.4 m/s, Heat 3: +0.8 m/s, Heat 4: -0.3 m/s

Rank	Heat	Name	Nationality	Time	Notes
1	2	Jerome Blake	Canada	10.11	Q
2	4	Eliezer Adjibi	Canada	10.23	Q
3	3	Ryiem Forde	Jamaica	10.24	Q, 10.232
4	3	Adrián Canales	Puerto Rico	10.24	q, 10.235
5	2	Rikkoi Brathwaite	British Virgin Islands	10.27	q
6	3	Alexander Ogando	Dominican Republic	10.33	q
7	3	Darren McQueen	Haiti	10.34	q
8	3	Cejhae Greene	Antigua and Barbuda	10.35	
9	2	Christopher Borzor	Haiti	10.36	
10	1	Kuron Griffith	Barbados	10.39	Q
11	4	Pedro Rivas	Puerto Rico	10.41	
12	4	Gerardo Lomelí	Mexico	10.43	
13	4	Terrence Jones	Bahamas	10.44	
14	2	Shakur Williams	Jamaica	10.44	
15	3	Nazzio John	Grenada	10.45	
16	1	Omari Lewis	Trinidad and Tobago	10.47	10.461
17	2	Troy Mason	Grenada	10.47	10.470
17	4	Jaden de Souza	Trinidad and Tobago	10.47	
19	1	Wanya McCoy	Bahamas	10.53	
20	1	Dwayne Fleming	Antigua and Barbuda	10.57	
21	4	Justin Maynard	Barbados	10.58	
22	1	McKish Compton	Saint Vincent and the Grenadines	10.72	
23	2	Augustin Alexander	Saint Lucia	10.74	
24	3	Cagini Pilgrim	Saint Lucia	10.92	
25	2	Jabari Michael-Kensu	Saint Vincent and the Grenadines	10.93	
26	4	Sanjay Weekes	Montserrat	10.94	
27	1	Tevique Benjamin	Montserrat	11.38	
	1	Franquelo Pérez	Dominican Republic	DNF	

Final – August 15

Wind: +0.4 m/s

Rank	Lane	Name	Nationality	Time	Notes
1st place, gold medalist(s)	6	Jerome Blake	Canada	9.95	CR, PB
2nd place, silver medalist(s)	5	Ryiem Forde	Jamaica	10.01	
3rd place, bronze medalist(s)	7	Rikkoi Brathwaite	British Virgin Islands	10.15	
4	3	Eliezer Adjibi	Canada	10.16	
5	4	Kuron Griffith	Barbados	10.18	
6	2	Adrián Canales	Puerto Rico	10.34	10.331
7	1	Alexander Ogando	Dominican Republic	10.34	10.334
8	8	Darren McQueen	Haiti	10.38	

=== 200 metres ===
Heats – August 16
Wind:
Heat 1: -1.4 m/s, Heat 2: -0.9 m/s, Heat 3: -0.6 m/s, Heat 4: -1.4 m/s

Rank	Heat	Name	Nationality	Time	Notes
1	1	Christopher Taylor	Jamaica	20.49	Q
2	1	Ian Kerr	Bahamas	20.68	q
3	3	José Figueroa	Puerto Rico	20.72	Q
4	2	Aaron Brown	Canada	20.82	Q
5	2	Adrián Canales	Puerto Rico	20.92	q
6	4	José González	Dominican Republic	20.93	Q
7	4	Kadrian Goldson	Jamaica	21.09	q
8	3	Elijah Joseph	Trinidad and Tobago	21.11	q, 21.108
9	2	Gerardo Lomelí	Mexico	21.11	21.109
10	4	Nazzio John	Grenada	21.13	
11	1	Melbin Marcelino	Dominican Republic	21.15	
12	4	Brendon Rodney	Canada	21.23	
13	1	Dwayne Fleming	Antigua and Barbuda	21.24	
14	3	Troy Mason	Grenada	21.31	
15	4	Darion Skerritt	Antigua and Barbuda	21.38	
16	3	Omar Simpson	United States Virgin Islands	21.39	
17	2	Jaden de Souza	Trinidad and Tobago	21.48	
18	1	Augustin Alexander	Saint Lucia	21.70	
19	2	Cagini Pilgrim	Saint Lucia	21.75	
20	3	Isaac Joseph	Haiti	21.88	
21	4	Jabari Michael-Kensu	Saint Vincent and the Grenadines	22.04	
22	2	Rayvon Black	Turks and Caicos Islands	22.84	
23	3	Tevique Benjamin	Montserrat	23.11	
	1	Yeykell Romero	Nicaragua	DNS	
	2	Sanjay Weekes	Montserrat	DNS	
	3	Luis Avilés	Mexico	DNS	

Final – August 16

Wind: -0.5 m/s

Rank	Lane	Name	Nationality	Time	Notes
1st place, gold medalist(s)	6	Aaron Brown	Canada	20.27	
2nd place, silver medalist(s)	7	Christopher Taylor	Jamaica	20.32	
3rd place, bronze medalist(s)	5	José Figueroa	Puerto Rico	20.53	
4	8	Ian Kerr	Bahamas	20.71	
5	4	Adrián Canales	Puerto Rico	20.80	
6	3	José González	Dominican Republic	20.86	
7	2	Kadrian Goldson	Jamaica	20.88	
8	1	Elijah Joseph	Trinidad and Tobago	21.09	

=== 400 metres ===
Heats – August 15

Rank	Heat	Name	Nationality	Time	Notes
1	2	Jenoah McKiver	United States	44.96	Q
2	1	Rusheen McDonald	Jamaica	45.48	Q
3	2	Wendell Miller	Bahamas	45.48	Q
4	2	Delano Kennedy	Jamaica	45.59	q
5	1	Michael Francois	Grenada	45.79	Q
6	3	Kirani James	Grenada	45.83	Q
7	2	Kyle Gale	Barbados	46.04	q
8	3	Marvric Pamphile	Saint Lucia	46.06	Q
9	1	Gabriel Moronta	Dominican Republic	46.09	
10	3	Erick Sánchez	Dominican Republic	46.16	
11	3	Desean Boyce	Barbados	46.24	
12	1	Alonzo Russell	Bahamas	46.81	
13	1	Edgar Ramírez	Mexico	46.82	
14	2	Jalen Dyett	Antigua and Barbuda	47.19	
15	3	Valente Mendoza	Mexico	47.28	
16	3	Brandon Valentine-Parris	Saint Vincent and the Grenadines	47.60	
17	1	Joshua Hill	British Virgin Islands	47.76	
18	2	Austin Cole	Canada	47.86	
19	3	Adin Corbette	Montserrat	51.02	

Final – August 17

Rank	Lane	Name	Nationality	Time	Notes
1st place, gold medalist(s)	4	Kirani James	Grenada	44.48	CR
2nd place, silver medalist(s)	6	Rusheen McDonald	Jamaica	45.04	
3rd place, bronze medalist(s)	5	Wendell Miller	Bahamas	45.12	45.112 PB
4	7	Jenoah McKiver	United States	45.12	45.115
5	1	Delano Kennedy	Jamaica	45.37	
6	8	Michael Francois	Grenada	45.50	
7	3	Marvric Pamphile	Saint Lucia	46.12	
	2	Kyle Gale	Barbados	DNF	

=== 800 metres ===
Heats – August 15

Rank	Heat	Name	Nationality	Time	Notes
1	2	Brandon Miller	United States	1:46.14	Q
2	2	Navasky Anderson	Jamaica	1:46.85	Q
3	2	Abdullahi Hassan	Canada	1:47.05	Q
4	2	John Rivera	Puerto Rico	1:47.23	q
5	1	Handal Roban	Saint Vincent and the Grenadines	1:48.96	Q
6	1	Tyrice Taylor	Jamaica	1:49.12	Q
7	1	Matti Erickson	Canada	1:49.18	Q
8	2	Nicholas Landeau	Trinidad and Tobago	1:49.59	q
9	1	Zalen Nelson	Trinidad and Tobago	1:49.82	
10	1	Israel Tinajero	Mexico	1:49.93	
11	1	Aaron Hernández	El Salvador	1:50.43	NR
12	2	Jeremiah Laduca	Saint Vincent and the Grenadines	1:52.26	

Final – August 16

Rank	Name	Nationality	Time	Notes
1st place, gold medalist(s)	Handal Roban	Saint Vincent and the Grenadines	1:42.87	CR, NR
2nd place, silver medalist(s)	Brandon Miller	United States	1:43.15	
3rd place, bronze medalist(s)	Tyrice Taylor	Jamaica	1:43.74	NR
4	Navasky Anderson	Jamaica	1:44.18	
5	Abdullahi Hassan	Canada	1:44.25	
6	Matti Erickson	Canada	1:46.80	
7	John Rivera	Puerto Rico	1:47.11	
8	Nicholas Landeau	Trinidad and Tobago	1:47.84	

=== 1500 metres ===
August 16

Rank	Name	Nationality	Time	Notes
1st place, gold medalist(s)	Foster Malleck	Canada	3:37.54	
2nd place, silver medalist(s)	Charles Philibert-Thiboutot	Canada	3:40.57	
3rd place, bronze medalist(s)	Carlos Vilches	Puerto Rico	3:41.34	
4	Diego García	Mexico	3:43.91	
5	Israel Tinajero	Mexico	3:45.09	
6	Dage Minors	Bermuda	3:47.70	
7	Aaron Hernández	El Salvador	3:47.93	NR
8	Nicholas Romany	Trinidad and Tobago	3:49.58	
9	Tafari Waldron	Trinidad and Tobago	3:51.67	
10	Ryan Outerbridge	Bermuda	3:53.38	
11	Wyndel Beyde	Aruba	4:01.66	
	Kenneth Talavera	Mexico	DNF	
	Nicholas Landeau	Trinidad and Tobago	DNF	

=== 5000 metres ===
August 15

Rank	Name	Nationality	Time	Notes
1st place, gold medalist(s)	Drew Hunter	United States	14:38.85	
2nd place, silver medalist(s)	Cooper Teare	United States	14:38.89	
3rd place, bronze medalist(s)	Héctor Pagan	Puerto Rico	14:40.60	
4	Diego García	Mexico	14:42.62	
5	Tafari Waldron	Trinidad and Tobago	14:49.38	
6	Nicholas Romany	Trinidad and Tobago	15:00.36	
7	Johnathan Turner	Bahamas	17:22.37	

=== 110 metres hurdles ===
Heats – August 15
Wind:
Heat 1: -0.3 m/s, Heat 2: +0.3 m/s

Rank	Heat	Name	Nationality	Time	Notes
1	2	Jahiem Stern	Jamaica	13.40	Q
2	2	Ja'Kobe Tharp	United States	13.47	Q
3	1	Dylan Beard	United States	13.54	Q
4	1	Demario Prince	Jamaica	13.60	Q
5	2	Antoine Andrews	Bahamas	13.67	Q
6	2	Rasheem Brown	Cayman Islands	13.86	q
7	1	Oscar Smith	Bahamas	13.87	Q
8	2	Cristián Rodríguez	Dominican Republic	13.96	q
9	1	Tai Brown	Barbados	14.57	

Final – August 15

Wind: -1.4 m/s

Rank	Lane	Name	Nationality	Time	Notes
1st place, gold medalist(s)	3	Demario Prince	Jamaica	13.35	
2nd place, silver medalist(s)	4	Dylan Beard	United States	13.39	
3rd place, bronze medalist(s)	5	Jahiem Stern	Jamaica	13.63	
4	1	Rasheem Brown	Cayman Islands	13.83	
5	2	Oscar Smith	Bahamas	14.08	
6	8	Cristián Rodríguez	Dominican Republic	14.23	
	7	Antoine Andrews	Bahamas	DNF	
	6	Ja'Kobe Tharp	United States	DNS	

=== 400 metres hurdles ===
Heats – August 15

Rank	Heat	Name	Nationality	Time	Notes
1	2	CJ Allen	United States	49.29	Q
2	1	Aldrich Bailey	United States	49.62	Q
3	1	Gerald Drummond	Costa Rica	49.69	Q
4	1	Dennick Luke	Dominica	49.78	Q
5	1	Pablo Andrés Ibáñez	El Salvador	49.87	q
6	2	Rasheeme Griffith	Barbados	50.11	Q
7	1	Assinie Wilson	Jamaica	50.31	q
8	2	Malik James-King	Jamaica	50.61	Q
9	2	Juander Santos	Dominican Republic	51.20	
10	2	Dennis Williamson	Bahamas	52.74	
	1	Malique Smith	United States Virgin Islands	DNS	
	2	Guillermo Campos	Mexico	DNS	

Final – August 16

Rank	Lane	Name	Nationality	Time	Notes
1st place, gold medalist(s)	6	CJ Allen	United States	48.22	
2nd place, silver medalist(s)	3	Malik James-King	Jamaica	48.28	
3rd place, bronze medalist(s)	2	Assinie Wilson	Jamaica	48.75	
4	8	Dennick Luke	Dominica	48.82	NR
5	5	Aldrich Bailey	United States	48.88	
6	4	Gerald Drummond	Costa Rica	49.08	
7	7	Rasheeme Griffith	Barbados	49.94	
8	1	Pablo Andrés Ibáñez	El Salvador	50.11	

=== 3000 metres steeplechase ===
August 17

Rank	Name	Nationality	Time	Notes
1st place, gold medalist(s)	Daniel Michalski	United States	8:14.07	CR, PB
2nd place, silver medalist(s)	Aaron Ahl	Canada	8:17.17	PB
3rd place, bronze medalist(s)	Kenneth Rooks	United States	8:26.52	
4	César Gómez	Mexico	8:48.04	
5	Arturo Reyna	Mexico	9:09.73	
	Víctor Ortiz	Puerto Rico	DNF	

=== 4 × 100 metres relay ===
August 17

Rank	Lane	Nation	Competitors	Time	Notes
1st place, gold medalist(s)	6	Canada	Aaron Brown, Jerome Blake, Brendon Rodney, Eliezer Adjibi	38.05	CR
2nd place, silver medalist(s)	7	Jamaica	Ashanie Smith, Kadrian Goldson, Ryiem Forde, Christopher Taylor	38.53	
3rd place, bronze medalist(s)	8	Bahamas	Adam Musgrove, Terrence Jones Jr., Ian Kerr, Wanya McCoy	38.57	
4	4	Barbados	Ajani Ince, Kuron Griffith, Mario Burke, Justin Maynard	39.03	
5	5	Grenada	Samuel Green, Troy Mason, Ethan Sam, Nazzio John	39.03	

=== 4 × 400 metres relay ===
August 17

Rank	Lane	Nation	Competitors	Time	Notes
1st place, gold medalist(s)	6	Jamaica	Bovel McPherson, Zandrion Barnes, Delano Kenedy, Rusheen McDonald	3:02.86	
2nd place, silver medalist(s)	4	Mexico	Edgar Ramírez, Guillermo Campos, Valente Mendoza, Luis Avilés	3:05.40	
3rd place, bronze medalist(s)	8	Grenada	Shaquane Toussaint, Phillip Jayden, Joshim Sylvester, Michael Francois	3:07.94	
4	5	Bahamas	Andrew Styles, Gregory Seymour, Andrew Brown, Wendell Miller	3:08.77	
	7	Barbados		DNS	

=== 20,000 metres walk ===
August 16

Rank	Name	Nationality	Time	Notes
1st place, gold medalist(s)	Érick Barrondo	Guatemala	1:28:54.12	
2nd place, silver medalist(s)	José Ortiz	Guatemala	1:28:55.32	
3rd place, bronze medalist(s)	Nick Christie	United States	1:32:15.28	
4	Emmanuel Corvera	United States	1:34:05.93	
5	Isaac Palma	Mexico	1:36:10.07	
	Lorenzo Dávila	Mexico	DNS	

=== High jump ===
August 17

Rank	Name	Nationality	1.85	1.90	2.05	2.10	2.15	2.18	2.21	2.24	2.30	Result	Notes
1st place, gold medalist(s)	Tyus Wilson	United States	–	–	–	o	xo	xo	o	o	xxx	2.24	
2nd place, silver medalist(s)	Donald Thomas	Bahamas	–	–	–	o	–	o	xo	xxx		2.21	
3rd place, bronze medalist(s)	Luis Castro	Puerto Rico	–	–	o	o	o	xxo	xo	xxx		2.21	
4	Arvesta Troupe	United States	–	–	–	o	xo	–	xxo	xxx		2.21	
5	Raymond Richards	Jamaica	–	–	–	–	o	o	xxx			2.18	
6	Erick Portillo	Mexico	–	–	–	xo	o	xxx				2.15	
7	Marcus Gelpi	Puerto Rico	–	–	o	o	xo	xxx				2.15	
8	Jair Portillo	Mexico	–	–	–	o	xxx					2.10	
9	Shaun Miller Jr.	Bahamas	–	–	o	xxx						2.05	
10	Denceel Álvarez	Guatemala	xxo	xxx								1.85	

=== Long jump ===
August 16

Rank	Name	Nationality	#1	#2	#3	#4	#5	#6	Result	Notes
1st place, gold medalist(s)	Nikaoli Williams	Jamaica	7.67	8.16	6.10	7.73	8.04	7.74	8.16	
2nd place, silver medalist(s)	Will Williams	United States	7.96	x	7.71	7.67	–	x	7.96	
3rd place, bronze medalist(s)	Shawn-D Thompson	Jamaica	6.15	7.87	7.85	7.76	x	7.79	7.87	
4	LaQuan Nairn	Bahamas	x	7.68	x	7.84	7.31	5.62	7.84	
5	Kelsey Daniel	Trinidad and Tobago	x	7.79	x	x	7.41	x	7.79	
6	Isaac Grimes	United States	7.77	x	7.60	x	7.62	7.70	7.77	
7	Michael Williams	Puerto Rico	7.67	7.75	x	x	7.31	7.68	7.75	
8	Kenneth West	Canada	7.49	x	x	x	7.27	x	7.49	
9	Johnathan Rodgers	Bahamas	x	7.23	7.28				7.28	
10	Melique Evans	Turks and Caicos Islands	x	6.21	6.05				6.21	

=== Triple jump ===
August 16

Rank	Name	Nationality	#1	#2	#3	#4	#5	#6	Result	Notes
1st place, gold medalist(s)	Kaiwan Culmer	Bahamas	16.56	15.93	–	x	–	15.92	16.56	
2nd place, silver medalist(s)	Andy Hechavarría	Cuba	16.45	16.10	–	13.91	15.68	15.77	16.45	
3rd place, bronze medalist(s)	Will Claye	United States	15.70	x	–	–	15.99	16.36	16.36	
4	Jason Castro	Honduras	14.75	14.43	14.40	–	–	14.80	14.80	
5	Rollie Hanna	Bahamas	x	x	x	x	14.46	x	14.46	

=== Shot put ===
August 15

Rank	Name	Nationality	#1	#2	#3	#4	#5	#6	Result	Notes
1st place, gold medalist(s)	Josh Awotunde	United States	20.54	20.73	21.68	21.05	21.18	20.58	21.68	CR
2nd place, silver medalist(s)	Uziel Muñoz	Mexico	20.03	20.41	20.89	19.78	20.50	20.70	20.89	
3rd place, bronze medalist(s)	Juan Carley Vázquez	Cuba	19.66	20.68	19.40	20.20	19.83	19.91	20.68	
4	Chrstopher Crawford	Trinidad and Tobago	18.66	x	x	18.32	19.00	19.11	19.11	
5	Djimon Gumbs	British Virgin Islands	18.09	18.87	x	x	x	18.52	18.87	
6	Hezekiel Romeo	Trinidad and Tobago	17.64	18.01	18.22	18.02	17.10	17.69	18.22	
7	Christopher Johnson	Antigua and Barbuda	15.17	16.98	x	x	16.71	15.44	16.98	NR
8	Frankie González	Dominican Republic	15.79	16.08	15.53	15.38	16.16	x	16.16	
9	Billy López	Guatemala	13.65	14.72	x				14.72	
10	Abner Johnson	Bahamas	x	13.82	14.41				14.41	

=== Discus throw ===
August 15

Rank	Name	Nationality	#1	#2	#3	#4	#5	#6	Result	Notes
1st place, gold medalist(s)	Fedrick Dacres	Jamaica	60.34	63.66	65.10	x	63.63	x	65.10	
2nd place, silver medalist(s)	Sam Mattis	United States	x	64.06	63.59	x	x	62.53	64.06	
3rd place, bronze medalist(s)	Chad Wright	Jamaica	58.80	61.44	61.29	62.85	61.95	59.01	62.85	
4	Reggie Jagers	United States	58.25	9.93	60.46	55.35	55.36	59.48	60.46	
5	Christopher Crawford	Trinidad and Tobago	x	55.28	x	x	51.16	56.45	56.45	
6	Djimon Gumbs	British Virgin Islands	53.41	56.44	x	53.94	53.18	x	56.44	
7	Umar Sandy	Trinidad and Tobago	x	51.10	53.20	x	x	x	53.20	

=== Hammer throw ===
August 15

Rank	Name	Nationality	#1	#2	#3	#4	#5	#6	Result	Notes
1st place, gold medalist(s)	Daniel Haugh	United States	74.00	76.20	77.08	x	72.95	x	77.08	
2nd place, silver medalist(s)	Rudy Winkler	United States	74.51	76.87	75.61	75.78	76.40	73.52	76.87	
3rd place, bronze medalist(s)	Jerome Vega	Puerto Rico	73.60	72.90	70.24	74.95	x	71.96	74.95	
4	Ronald Mencía	Cuba	67.08	x	71.79	70.68	70.38	68.86	71.79	
5	Diego del Real	Mexico	70.83	71.17	x	71.68	69.10	69.54	71.68	
6	Rowan Hamilton	Canada	70.02	70.23	70.87	70.76	71.34	x	71.34	
7	Michael Soler	Puerto Rico	63.77	61.48	64.85	x	x	64.19	64.85	

=== Javelin throw ===
August 17

Rank	Name	Nationality	#1	#2	#3	#4	#5	#6	Result	Notes
1st place, gold medalist(s)	Curtis Thompson	United States	81.35	87.24	86.17	x	74.64	80.32	87.24	CR
2nd place, silver medalist(s)	Dash Sirmon	United States	67.38	69.25	74.95	70.41	73.11	77.04	77.04	
3rd place, bronze medalist(s)	Elvis Graham	Jamaica	69.41	76.69	74.31	72.97	76.28	70.62	76.69	
4	Keyshawn Strachan	Bahamas	69.76	74.67	76.57	71.43	74.34	69.13	76.57	
5	Luis Taracena	Guatemala	60.75	62.08	x	62.13	57.29	64.84	64.84	

=== Decathlon ===
August 15–16

The highest mark recorded in each event is highlighted in yellow

Rank	Athlete	Nationality	100m	LJ	SP	HJ	400m	110m H	DT	PV	JT	1500m	Points	Notes
1st place, gold medalist(s)	Austin West	United States	10.90	7.24	14.55	2.04	47.17	15.08	42.04	4.60	61.48	4:47.16	8038	CR
2nd place, silver medalist(s)	Kendrick Thompson	Bahamas	10.73	7.86	13.07	2.01	47.26	14.31	40.00	4.40	64.57	DQ	7515	
3rd place, bronze medalist(s)	Kenny Moxey Jr.	Bahamas	11.34	6.44	13.39	1.92	51.52	15.42	28.24	4.20	46.64	5:43.98	6412	
	Estebán Ibáñez	El Salvador	11.20	6.98	11.07	DNS	–	–	–	–	–	–	DNF	

== Women's results ==
=== 100 metres ===
Heats – August 15
Wind:
Heat 1: +0.8 m/s, Heat 2: -1.4 m/s

Rank	Heat	Name	Nationality	Time	Notes
1	1	Jodean Williams	Jamaica	11.00	Q
2	2	Sade McCreath	Canada	11.11	Q
3	1	Liranyi Alonso	Dominican Republic	11.16	Q
4	2	Jonielle Smith	Jamaica	11.21	Q
5	1	Audrey Leduc	Canada	11.24	Q, 11.233
6	1	Anthaya Charlton	Bahamas	11.24	q, 11.235
7	1	Miriam Sánchez	Mexico	11.27	q
8	2	Camille Rutherford	Bahamas	11.32	Q
9	2	Twanisha Terry	United States	11.33	
10	1	Gladymar Torres	Puerto Rico	11.36	
11	2	Beyoncé Defreitas	British Virgin Islands	11.44	
12	1	Tri-Tania Lowe	Anguilla	11.52	
13	2	Akilah Lewis	Trinidad and Tobago	11.63	
14	2	Adanelys Rodríguez	Puerto Rico	11.65	
15	1	Mariandree Chacón	Guatemala	12.03	

Final – August 15

Wind: +0.1 m/s

Rank	Lane	Name	Nationality	Time	Notes
1st place, gold medalist(s)	6	Jonielle Smith	Jamaica	11.05	
2nd place, silver medalist(s)	3	Liranyi Alonso	Dominican Republic	11.10	
3rd place, bronze medalist(s)	8	Anthaya Charlton	Bahamas	11.12	
4	5	Jodean Williams	Jamaica	11.13	
5	4	Sade McCreath	Canada	11.19	
6	2	Camille Rutherford	Bahamas	11.23	
7	1	Miriam Sánchez	Mexico	11.31	
8	7	Audrey Leduc	Canada	11.43	

=== 200 metres ===
Heats – August 16
Wind:
Heat 1: -2.1 m/s, Heat 2: -1.4 m/s

Rank	Heat	Name	Nationality	Time	Notes
1	1	Anthonique Strachan	Bahamas	23.02	Q
2	2	Gabrielle Matthews	Jamaica	23.04	Q
3	2	Camille Rutherford	Bahamas	23.13	Q
4	1	Miriam Sánchez	Mexico	23.41	Q
5	1	Jacqueline Madogo	Canada	23.42	Q
6	2	Cecilia Tamayo-Garza	Mexico	23.43	Q
7	1	Beyoncé Defreitas	British Virgin Islands	23.51	q
8	1	Roniesha McGregor	Jamaica	23.59	q
9	2	Sakena Massiah	Barbados	23.97	
10	1	Tionce Walrond	Barbados	24.08	
11	2	Adanelys Rodríguez	Puerto Rico	24.35	
12	1	Rori Lowe	Honduras	24.62	
	1	Mariandree Chacón	Guatemala	DNS	
	2	María Alejandra Carmona	Nicaragua	DNS	
	2	Audrey Leduc	Canada	DNS	

Final – August 16

Wind: -0.6 m/s

Rank	Lane	Name	Nationality	Time	Notes
1st place, gold medalist(s)	5	Anthonique Strachan	Bahamas	22.77	
2nd place, silver medalist(s)	8	Miriam Sánchez	Mexico	22.87	
3rd place, bronze medalist(s)	6	Gabrielle Matthews	Jamaica	23.02	
4	2	Beyoncé Defreitas	British Virgin Islands	23.06	
5	7	Camille Rutherford	Bahamas	23.28	
6	3	Jacqueline Madogo	Canada	23.30	
7	1	Roniesha McGregor	Jamaica	23.38	
8	4	Cecilia Tamayo-Garza	Mexico	23.58	

=== 400 metres ===
Heats – August 15

Rank	Heat	Name	Nationality	Time	Notes
1	2	Nickiesha Pryce	Jamaica	50.39	Q
2	2	Printassia Johnson	Bahamas	51.07	Q
3	2	Wadeline Venlogh	Haiti	51.15	Q
4	1	Lynna Irby-Jackson	United States	51.17	Q
5	1	Shaunae Miller-Uibo	Bahamas	51.44	Q
6	2	Gabby Scott	Puerto Rico	51.89	q
7	1	Caitlyn Bobb	Bermuda	52.03	Q
8	1	Lauren Gale	Canada	52.09	q
9	1	Dejanea Oakley	Jamaica	52.10	
10	2	Zoe Sherar	Canada	52.34	
11	1	Anabel Medina	Dominican Republic	53.97	
12	2	Hannah Charles	Saint Lucia	54.36	
13	2	Sarai Javier	Puerto Rico	55.28	
14	1	Roneisha Johnson	Turks and Caicos Islands	1:02.48	

Final – August 17

Rank	Lane	Name	Nationality	Time	Notes
1st place, gold medalist(s)	6	Nickiesha Pryce	Jamaica	49.95	
2nd place, silver medalist(s)	8	Wadeline Venlogh	Haiti	50.23	NR
3rd place, bronze medalist(s)	4	Lynna Irby-Jackson	United States	50.47	
4	5	Printassia Johnson	Bahamas	51.35	
5	2	Gabby Scott	Puerto Rico	51.96	
6	1	Lauren Gale	Canada	52.43	
	3	Caitlyn Bobb	Bermuda	DNS	
	7	Shaunae Miller-Uibo	Bahamas	DNS	

=== 800 metres ===
August 16

Rank	Name	Nationality	Time	Notes
1st place, gold medalist(s)	Nia Akins	United States	1:59.75	
2nd place, silver medalist(s)	Shafiqua Maloney	Saint Vincent and the Grenadines	1:59.98	
3rd place, bronze medalist(s)	Kelly-Ann Beckford	Jamaica	2:00.17	PB
4	Jazz Shukla	Canada	2:00.43	
5	Meghan Hunter	United States	2:00.67	
6	Mikaela Smith	United States Virgin Islands	2:11.09	
7	Tanesia Gardiner	Turks and Caicos Islands	2:23.54	

=== 1500 metres ===
August 16

Rank	Name	Nationality	Time	Notes
1st place, gold medalist(s)	Emily Mackay	United States	4:09.48	
2nd place, silver medalist(s)	Dani Jones	United States	4:10.49	
3rd place, bronze medalist(s)	Lucia Stafford	Canada	4:11.11	
4	Mia Cabrera	Mexico	4:29.10	
5	Rachel Conhoff	United States Virgin Islands	5:02.43	
	Lorena Rangel	Mexico	DNS	

=== 5000 metres ===
August 17

Rank	Name	Nationality	Time	Notes
1st place, gold medalist(s)	Anisleidis Ochoa	Cuba	15:35.80	
2nd place, silver medalist(s)	Bailey Hertenstein	United States	15:36.34	
3rd place, bronze medalist(s)	Regan Yee	Canada	15:39.56	
4	Chloe Thomas	Canada	15:39.77	
5	Gracelyn Larkin	Canada	16:38.73	
6	Mia Cabrera	Mexico	16:42.22	
7	Idelma Delgado	El Salvador	19:13.20	

=== 10,000 metres ===
August 15

Rank	Name	Nationality	Time	Notes
1st place, gold medalist(s)	Taylor Roe	United States	32:19.84	CR
2nd place, silver medalist(s)	Anisleidis Ochoa	Cuba	33:37.20	
3rd place, bronze medalist(s)	Beverly Ramos	Puerto Rico	36:08.11	
4	Idelma Delgado	El Salvador	39:48.73	

=== 100 metres hurdles ===
Heats – August 15
Wind:
Heat 1: -0.1 m/s, Heat 2: +0.1 m/s

Rank	Heat	Name	Nationality	Time	Notes
1	1	Amoi Brown	Jamaica	12.80	Q
2	2	Mariam Abdul-Rashid	Canada	12.98	Q
3	1	Tatiana Aholou	Canada	12.99	Q
4	2	Andrea Vargas	Costa Rica	13.04	Q
5	2	Yanique Thompson	Jamaica	13.05	Q
6	2	Aasia Laurencin	Saint Lucia	13.15	q
7	1	Paola Vázquez	Puerto Rico	13.33	Q
8	1	Denisha Cartwright	Bahamas	13.39	q
9	1	Deya Erickson	British Virgin Islands	13.46	

Final – August 15

Wind: -1.1 m/s

Rank	Lane	Name	Nationality	Time	Notes
1st place, gold medalist(s)	5	Amoi Brown	Jamaica	12.83	
2nd place, silver medalist(s)	6	Tatiana Aholou	Canada	13.01	
3rd place, bronze medalist(s)	8	Aasia Laurencin	Saint Lucia	13.04	
4	4	Mariam Abdul-Rashid	Canada	13.07	
5	7	Yanique Thompson	Jamaica	13.19	
6	1	Denisha Cartwright	Bahamas	13.33	
7	2	Paola Vázquez	Puerto Rico	13.42	
8	3	Andrea Vargas	Costa Rica	13.46	

=== 400 metres hurdles ===
Heats – August 15

Rank	Heat	Name	Nationality	Time	Notes
1	1	Sanique Walker	Jamaica	54.2h	Q
2	1	Jessica Wright	United States	55.0h	Q
3	1	Yara Amador	Mexico	55.2h	Q
4	1	Yanique Haye-Smith	Turks and Caicos Islands	55.5h	q
1	2	Tia-Adana Belle	Barbados	55.83	Q
2	2	Daniela Rojas	Costa Rica	55.86	Q, NR
3	2	Grace Claxton	Puerto Rico	56.45	Q
4	2	Janieve Russell	Jamaica	56.80	q
5	2	Katrina Seymour-Stamps	Bahamas	58.49	

Final – August 16

Rank	Lane	Name	Nationality	Time	Notes
1st place, gold medalist(s)	5	Tia-Adana Belle	Barbados	54.67	
2nd place, silver medalist(s)	6	Sanique Walker	Jamaica	54.94	
3rd place, bronze medalist(s)	8	Yara Amador	Mexico	55.55	
4	7	Daniela Rojas	Costa Rica	55.67	55.662 NR
5	3	Grace Claxton	Puerto Rico	55.67	55.670
6	4	Jessica Wright	United States	55.72	
7	2	Janieve Russell	Jamaica	56.58	
8	1	Yanique Haye-Smith	Turks and Caicos Islands	57.81	

=== 3000 metres steeplechase ===
August 17

Rank	Name	Nationality	Time	Notes
1st place, gold medalist(s)	Krissy Gear	United States	9:35.27	
2nd place, silver medalist(s)	Grace Fetherstonhaugh	Canada	9:43.91	
3rd place, bronze medalist(s)	Alondra Negrón	Puerto Rico	10:31.96	
4	Ana Cristina Narvaez	Mexico	10:41.63	

=== 20,000 metres walk ===
August 16

Rank	Name	Nationality	Time	Notes
1st place, gold medalist(s)	Rachelle De Orbeta	Puerto Rico	1:36:15.88	CR
2nd place, silver medalist(s)	Mirna Ortiz	Guatemala	1:37:52.58	
3rd place, bronze medalist(s)	Alejandra Ortega	Mexico	1:43:45.30	
4	Katie Burnett	United States	1:45:16.36	

=== High jump ===
August 16

Rank	Name	Nationality	1.75	1.80	1.85	1.88	1.91	1.94	Result	Notes
1st place, gold medalist(s)	Sanaa Barnes	United States	o	o	o	o	o	xxx	1.91	
2nd place, silver medalist(s)	Vashti Cunningham	United States	–	–	o	xo	xxo	xxx	1.91	
3rd place, bronze medalist(s)	Dacsy Brison	Cuba	–	xo	o	xo	xxx		1.88	
4	Sakari Famous	Bermuda	o	o	xxx				1.80	

=== Long jump ===
August 15

Rank	Name	Nationality	#1	#2	#3	#4	#5	#6	Result	Notes
1st place, gold medalist(s)	Alyssa Jones	United States	6.70	6.74	6.63	6.54	x	6.00	6.74	
2nd place, silver medalist(s)	Alysbeth Félix	Puerto Rico	6.64	x	x	6.42	6.58	x	6.64	
3rd place, bronze medalist(s)	Tyra Gittens-Spotsville	Trinidad and Tobago	6.11	6.43	6.52	6.12	6.64	6.36	6.64	
4	Chantel Malone	British Virgin Islands	6.48	6.60	6.29	6.29	6.37	6.44	6.60	
5	Paola Fernández	Puerto Rico	6.34	6.59	6.26	6.36	6.19	6.45	6.59	
6	Nia Robinson	Jamaica	6.36	6.29	x	6.09	6.03	x	6.36	
7	Tri-Tania Lowe	Anguilla	5.72	5.10	5.99	2.93	5.66	5.72	5.99	
8	Kimberly Smith	British Virgin Islands	5.93	x	x	5.66	x	1.79	5.93	
9	Ashantae Graham	Cayman Islands	5.35	5.29	x				5.35	
	Anthaya Charlton	Bahamas	x	r					NM	

=== Triple jump ===
August 17

Rank	Name	Nationality	#1	#2	#3	#4	#5	#6	Result	Notes
1st place, gold medalist(s)	Shanieka Ricketts	Jamaica	x	14.23	13.84	13.48	x	13.60	14.23	
2nd place, silver medalist(s)	Euphenie Andre	United States	13.26	x	12.89	12.92	13.15	x	13.26	
3rd place, bronze medalist(s)	Agur Dwol	United States	x	13.15	12.32	13.13	13.20	12.98	13.20	
4	Thelma Fuentes	Guatemala	12.39	x	12.25	x	12.50	12.54	12.54	
5	Rebeca Barrientos	El Salvador	11.96	11.85	11.78	x	11.90	11.83	11.96	

=== Shot put ===
August 17

Rank	Name	Nationality	#1	#2	#3	#4	#5	#6	Result	Notes
1st place, gold medalist(s)	Sarah Mitton	Canada	19.10	x	19.13	20.02	19.22	x	20.02	
2nd place, silver medalist(s)	Jessica Ramsey	United States	17.49	18.02	x	18.27	x	x	18.27	
3rd place, bronze medalist(s)	Jessica Woodard	United States	17.46	x	17.22	16.95	17.87	18.05	18.05	
4	Dianelis Delís	Cuba	17.37	17.89	16.99	16.83	17.28	17.32	17.89	
5	Lloydricia Cameron	Jamaica	16.83	17.47	17.41	17.58	16.99	17.77	17.77	
6	Rosa Ramírez	Dominican Republic	16.88	16.65	17.25	x	17.37	17.15	17.37	
7	Treneese Hamilton	Dominica	16.89	17.15	16.49	17.29	x	x	17.29	
8	Kelsie Murrel-Ross	Grenada	15.53	16.38	16.42	15.62	x	16.63	16.63	
	Prizila Negrete	Honduras							DNS	

=== Discus throw ===
August 16

Rank	Name	Nationality	#1	#2	#3	#4	#5	#6	Result	Notes
1st place, gold medalist(s)	Samantha Hall	Jamaica	x	56.53	59.58	59.68	61.19	x	61.19	
2nd place, silver medalist(s)	Gabi Jacobs	United States	48.18	47.70	56.54	54.57	52.24	57.07	57.07	
3rd place, bronze medalist(s)	Julia Tunks	Canada	51.60	x	56.78	x	x	56.31	56.78	
4	Melany Matheus	Cuba	52.89	x	55.86	52.42	x	54.84	55.86	
5	Tiara DeRosa	Bermuda	44.59	41.84	48.36	45.70	45.50	47.50	48.36	
6	Estefani Sosa	Guatemala	41.51	39.97	38.82	35.53	38.66	39.57	41.51	
7	Prizila Negrete	Honduras	38.27	x	38.42	39.40	39.46	39.49	39.49	

=== Hammer throw ===
August 16

Rank	Name	Nationality	#1	#2	#3	#4	#5	#6	Result	Notes
1st place, gold medalist(s)	Janee' Kassanavoid	United States	x	x	69.94	x	74.31	71.01	74.31	
2nd place, silver medalist(s)	Nayoka Clunis	Jamaica	59.87	62.79	67.84	66.85	69.30	x	69.30	
3rd place, bronze medalist(s)	Jillian Weir	Canada	67.79	68.30	68.55	69.08	68.91	x	69.08	
4	Janeah Stewart	United States	62.36	x	64.07	63.80	64.32	x	64.32	

=== Javelin throw ===
August 17

Rank	Name	Nationality	#1	#2	#3	#4	#5	#6	Result	Notes
1st place, gold medalist(s)	Evie Bliss	United States	51.84	54.70	58.62	54.38	51.96	x	58.62	
2nd place, silver medalist(s)	Madison Wiltrout	United States	54.93	57.36	x	57.82	54.53	58.33	58.33	
3rd place, bronze medalist(s)	Rhema Otabor	Bahamas	51.20	53.70	x	x	52.95	51.99	53.70	
4	Dior-Rae Scott	Bahamas	38.71	42.96	43.88	43.86	48.49	43.56	48.49	
5	Sofía Alonso	Guatemala	33.91	31.82	35.53	x	36.45	34.53	36.45	
	Esperanza Sibaja	Nicaragua							DNS	
	Esther Padilla	Honduras							DNS	

== Mixed results ==
=== 4 × 400 metres relay ===
August 16

Rank	Lane	Nation	Competitors	Time	Notes
1st place, gold medalist(s)	4	Jamaica	Bovel McPherson, Leah Anderson, Zandrion Barnes, Stacey-Ann Williams	3:11.10	CR, NR
2nd place, silver medalist(s)	5	Bahamas	Gregory Seymour, Katrina Seymour-Stamps, Andrew Styles, Javonya Valcourt	3:18.93	
3rd place, bronze medalist(s)	6	Barbados	Desean Boyce, Sakena Massiah, Raheem Taitt-Best, Tia-Adana Belle	3:20.80	NR
4	7	Turks and Caicos Islands	Melique Evans, Yanique Haye-Smith, Rayvon Black, Tanesia Gardiner	3:36.57	NR
