= 2019 CARIFTA Games =

XLVIII CARIFTA Games
- Dates: 20–22 April
- Host city: George Town, Cayman Islands
- Venue: Truman Bodden Sports Complex
- Level: Junior and Youth
- Events: Junior: 34 (incl. 3 open), Youth: 30

The 2019 CARIFTA Games took place between 20 and 22 April 2019. The event was held at the Truman Bodden Sports Complex in George Town, Cayman Islands.

== Medal summary ==
=== Boys U-20 (Junior) ===
Event	Gold		Silver		Bronze	
100 metres (+0.3 m/s)	Oblique Seville; Jamaica	10.24	Ryiem Robertson; Jamaica	10.37	Adrian Curry; Bahamas	10.42
200 metres (+0.5 m/s)	Xavier Nairne; Jamaica	20.65	Antonio Watson; Jamaica	20.83	Terrence Jones; Bahamas	20.89
400 metres	Terrence Jones; Bahamas	46.29	Anthony Cox; Jamaica	46.36	Evaldo Whitehorne; Jamaica	46.39
800 metres	Kimar Farquharson; Jamaica	1:49.65	Tyrice Taylor; Jamaica	1:49.73	Handal Roban; Saint Vincent and the Grenadines	1:52.22
1500 metres	Tyrese Reid; Jamaica	3:55.38	Fabian Campbell; Jamaica	3:56.23	Gabriel Curtis; Bahamas	3:58.11
5000 metres ^{†}	Keveroy Venson; Jamaica	15:21.30	Gabriel Curtis; Bahamas	15:23.15	Fabian Campbell; Jamaica	16:00.03
110 metres hurdles (99 cm) (-0.3 m/s)	Rasheed Broadbell; Jamaica	13.26	Vashaun Vasciani; Jamaica	13.32	Jeanice Laviolette; Guadeloupe	13.39
400 metres hurdles (91.4 cm)	Rasheeme Griffith; Barbados	51.47	Matthew Thompson; Bahamas	52.23	Shamar Brown; Jamaica	52.51
High jump	Shaun Miller; Bahamas	2.16m	Horatio Humphrey; Jamaica	2.14m	Romaine Beckford; Jamaica	2.14m
Pole vault ^{†}	Baptiste Thiery; Martinique	4.50m	Vano Rahming; Bahamas	3.75m	Louis-Durand Nerome; Guadeloupe	3.60m
Long jump	Wayne Pinnock; Jamaica	7.84m	Jordan Turner; Jamaica	7.33m	Daniel Kelsey; Trinidad and Tobago	7.32m
Triple jump	Johnaton Miller; Barbados	15.30m	Daniel Kelsey; Trinidad and Tobago	15.14m	Apalos Edwards; Jamaica	15.05m
Shot put (6.0 kg)	Cobe Graham; Jamaica	18.62m	Johann Jeremiah; Grenada	18.53m	Kai Chang; Jamaica	17.57m
Discus throw (1.75 kg)	Kai Chang; Jamaica	59.36m	Ralford Mullings; Jamaica	54.91m	Djimon Gumbs; British Virgin Islands	54.76m
Javelin throw (800 gr)	Tyriq Horsford; Trinidad and Tobago	71.45m	Deandre Collins; Grenada	62.00m	Hughie Sean Rolle; Bahamas	60.45m
Octathlon ^{†}	David Edmondson; Jamaica	5413	Patrick Johnson; Bahamas	5244	Anson Moses; Trinidad and Tobago	5107
4 × 100 metres relay	Jamaica; Oblique Seville; Vashaun Vascianna; Xavier Nairne; Ryiem Robertson	39.46	Bahamas; Ure Mills; Rico Moultrie; Adrian Curry; Joel Johnson	39.49	Barbados; Rasheeme Griffith; Tramaine Smith; Jameel Walkes-Miller; Matthew Clarke	40.18
4 × 400 metres relay	Jamaica; Evaldo Whitehorne; Kimar Farquharson; Antonio Watson; Anthony Cox	3:07.82	Barbados; Miguel Nicholas; Antonio Hoyte-Small; Dalano Wickham; Kyle Gale	3:08.98	Bahamas; Shaun Miller; Terrence Jones; Markenson Joseph; Matthew Thompson	3:14.54

^{†}: Open event for both junior and youth athletes.

=== Girls U-20 (Junior) ===
Event	Gold		Silver		Bronze	
100 metres (+0.3 m/s)	Briana Williams; Jamaica	11.25	Akilah Lewis; Trinidad and Tobago	11.62	Kemba Nelson; Jamaica	11.68
200 metres (+0.9 m/s)	Briana Williams; Jamaica	22.89	Joanne Reid; Jamaica	23.69	Beyonce De Freitas; British Virgin Islands	23.79
400 metres	Shaquena Foote; Jamaica	52.63	Anna-Kay Allen; Jamaica	53.53	Rae-Anne Serville; Trinidad and Tobago	54.18
800 metres	Jasmine Knowles; Bahamas	2:09.49	Joanna Archer; Guyana	2:10.17	Schaafe Abigail; Jamaica	2:12.73
1500 metres	Claudrice McKoy; Guyana	4:39.46	Kelly-Ann Beckford; Jamaica	4:40.49	Aneisha Lawrence; Jamaica	4:41.19
3000 metres ^{†}	Isabell Dutranoit; Bermuda	10:21.63	Kelly-Ann Beckford; Jamaica	10:28.13	Claudrice McKoy; Guyana	10:37.43
100 metres hurdles (84 cm) (+0.8 m/s)	Ackera Nugent; Jamaica	13.24	Sarah Belle; Barbados	13.55	Gabrielle Gibson; Bahamas	13.80
400 metres hurdles (76 cm)	Shaquena Foote; Jamaica	58.05	Johnelle Thomas; Jamaica	58.77	Tamia Badal; Trinidad and Tobago	61.34
High jump	Janique Burgher; Jamaica	1.77m	Daniella Anglin; Jamaica	1.77m	Aijah Lewis; Cayman Islands	1.60m
Long jump	Chantoba Bright; Guyana	6.05m	Lotavia Brown; Jamaica	5.83m	Fiona Aholu-Futse; Martinique	5.78m
Triple jump	Lotavia Brown; Jamaica	13.09m	Chantoba Bright; Guyana	12.63m	Monifah Djoe; Suriname	12.41m
Shot put (4.0 kg)	Kelsie Murrel-Ross; Grenada	14.22m	Thamera Manette; Martinique	13.53m	Ianna Monique Roach; Trinidad and Tobago	13.51m
Discus throw (1.0 kg)	Marie Forbes; Jamaica	47.63m	Kimone Reid; Jamaica	44.60m	Kelsie Murrell-Ross; Grenada	40.30m
Javelin throw (600 gr)	Rhema Otabor; Bahamas	43.07m	Antonia Sealy; Trinidad and Tobago	42.34m	Kymoi Noray; Trinidad and Tobago	41.58m
Heptathlon ^{†}	Safiya John; Trinidad and Tobago	5143	Antonia Sealy; Trinidad and Tobago	4847	Kelsie Murrell-Ross; Grenada	4730
4 × 100 metres relay	Jamaica; Briana Williams; Kimone Reid; Ackera Nugent; Kemba Nelson	44.25	Trinidad and Tobago; Leah Bernard; Akilah Lewis; Naomi Campbell; Alya Stanisclaus	45.11	Barbados; Shemia Odaine; Sarah Belle; Rhea Hoyte; Ashlee Lowe	45.52
4 × 400 metres relay	Jamaica; Quaycian Davis; Rickiann Russell; Sashel Reid; Dejenea Oakley	3:41.00	British Virgin Islands; Akrisa Eristee; Kaelyaah Liburd; Ariyah Smith; Jahtivya Williams	3:44.89	Trinidad and Tobago; Malika Coutain; Taejha Badal; Christie Maharaj; Natasha Fox	3:44.91

^{†}: Open event for both junior and youth athletes.

=== Boys U-17 (Youth) ===
Event	Gold		Silver		Bronze	
100 metres (+0.5 m/s)	Devin Augustine; Trinidad and Tobago	10.62	Bouwahjgie Nkrumie; Jamaica	10.71	Jaleel Croal; British Virgin Islands	10.80
200 metres (+0.7 m/s)	Jaleel Croal; British Virgin Islands	21.43	Christopher Scott; Jamaica	21.73	Richard Nelson; Jamaica	21.84
400 metres	Wendell Miller; Bahamas	48.45	Tahj Hamm; Jamaica	48.54	Tariq Dacres; Jamaica	48.70
800 metres	Nirobi Smith-Mills; Bermuda	1:57.95	Savion Hoyte; Barbados	1:58.62	Adrian Nethersole; Jamaica	1:58.78
1500 metres	Mitchell Curtis; Bahamas	4:09.34	J'Voughnn Blake; Jamaica	4:11.47	Nathan Armstrong; Bermuda	4:13.59
3000 metres	Matthew Gordon; Guyana	9:12.43	Nathan Armstrong; Bermuda	9:13.13	Mitchell Curtis; Bahamas	9:16.86
110 metres hurdles (91.4 cm) (+0.6 m/s)	Dishaun Lamb; Jamaica	13.54	Neil-Matthew Sutherland; Jamaica	13.61	Matthew Sophia; Curaçao	13.64
400 metres hurdles (84 cm)	Jayden Brown; Jamaica	53.03	Sharvis Simmonds; Jamaica	54.11	Aren Spencer; Barbados	54.26
High jump	Matthew Sophia; Curaçao	2.00m	Blaime Byam; Jamaica	1.95m	Brandon Pottinger; Jamaica	1.95m
Long jump	Caleb Massiah; Barbados	6.84m	Khybah Dawson; British Virgin Islands	6.83m	Jahiem Cox; Jamaica	6.73m
Triple jump	Rajuan Ricketts; Jamaica	14.26m	Jahiem Cox; Jamaica	14.01m	Aren Spencer; Barbados	13.81m
Shot put (5.0 kg)	Christopher Young; Jamaica	16.00m	Kobe Lawrence; Jamaica	15.86m	Jayden Scott; Trinidad and Tobago	15.08m
Discus throw (1.50 kg)	Kobe Lawrence; Jamaica	53.32m	Christopher Young; Jamaica	51.34m	Jayden Scott; Trinidad and Tobago	47.50m
Javelin throw (700 gr)	Keyshawn Strachan; Bahamas	64.31m	Cameron Thomas; Grenada	57.44m	Veayon Joseph; Trinidad and Tobago	55.77m
4 × 100 metres relay	Jamaica; Richard Nelson; Adrian Kerr; Christopher Scott; Bouwahjgie Nkrumie	41.59	Bahamas; Mateo Smith; Wendell Miller; Otto Laing; Davon Johnson	42.18	Trinidad and Tobago; Anthony Diaz; Shakeem McKay; Miguel Taylor; Jordon Pope	42.45
4 × 400 metres relay	Jamaica; Tariq Dacres; Tahj Hamm; Adrian Nethersole; Jayden Brown	3:16.56	Trinidad and Tobago; Jessiah Jones; Ryan Campbell; Rinaldo Moore; Jordon Pope	3:18.71	Saint Kitts and Nevis; Shamarie Roberts; K'Anthon Benjamin; Ishan Roberts; Akadianto Willet	3:25.84

=== Girls U-17 (Youth) ===
Event	Gold		Silver		Bronze	
100 metres (+0.5 m/s)	Anthaya Charlton; Bahamas	11.51	Shaniqua Bascombe; Trinidad and Tobago	11.72	Ulanda Lewis; Saint Vincent and the Grenadines	11.91
200 metres (+1.0 m/s)	Shaniqua Bascombe; Trinidad and Tobago	23.36	Brianna Lyston; Jamaica	23.53	Ulanda Lewis; Saint Vincent and the Grenadines	24.09
400 metres	Caitlyn Bobb; Bermuda	53.69	Akrisa Eristee; British Virgin Islands	54.10	Rickianna Russell; Jamaica	54.18
800 metres	Jodyann Mitchell; Jamaica	2:11.92	Kishay Rowe; Jamaica	2:11.97	Adriel Austin; Guyana	2:12.69
1500 metres	Samantha Pryce; Jamaica	4:47.34	Jodyann Mitchell; Jamaica	4:49.49	Shaquka Tyrell; Guyana	4:52.52
100 metres hurdles (76 cm) (+1.6 m/s)	Kay-Lagay Clarke; Jamaica	13.68 CR	Chrystal Shaw; Jamaica	13.72	Anthaya Charlton; Bahamas	13.83
400 metres hurdles (76 cm)	Quaycian Davis; Jamaica	1:00.78 CR	Sashell Reid; Jamaica	1:01.59	Reshae Dean; Bahamas	1:03.52
High jump	Annishka McDonald; Jamaica	1.74m	Vanessa Mercera; Curaçao	1.74m	Shaunece Miller; Bahamas	1.68m
Long jump	Anthaya Charlton; Bahamas	5.81m	Anne-Sophie Tassius; Guadeloupe	5.74m	Paula-Ann Chambers; Jamaica	5.62m
Triple jump	Anne-Sophie Tassius; Guadeloupe	12.50m	Kay-Lagay Clarke; Jamaica	11.69m	Princess Browne; Guyana	11.52m
Shot put (3.0 kg)	Alicia Grootfaam; Suriname	14.15m	Treneese Hamilton; Dominica	14.14m	Jamora Alves; Grenada	13.53m
Discus throw (1.0 kg)	Cedricka Williams; Jamaica	47.94m	Damali Williams; Jamaica	40.87m	Treneese Hamilton; Dominica	39.29m
Javelin throw (500 gr)	Anisha Gibbons; Guyana	40.34m	Vivica Addison; Barbados	39.70m	Rachell Pascal; Cayman Islands	35.50m
4 × 100 metres relay	Jamaica; Crystal Shaw; Brianna Lyston; Glacian Loutin; Kay-lagay Clarke	45.63	Trinidad and Tobago; Reneisha Andrews; Shaniqua Bascombe; Karessa Kirton; Taejha Badal	45.73	Bermuda; Caitlyn Bobb; Keturah Bulford-Trott, Sanaa Rae Morris; Za'kayza Parsons	47.47
4 × 400 metres relay	Jamaica; Quaycian Davis; Rickiann Russell; Sashel Reid; Dejenea Oakley	3:41.00	British Virgin Islands; Akrisa Eristee; Kaelyaah Liburd; Ariyah Smith; Jahtivya Williams	3:44.89	Trinidad and Tobago; Malika Coutain; Taejha Badal; Christie Maharaj; Natasha Fox	3:44.91

== Medal table ==
Rank	Nation	Gold	Silver	Bronze	Total
1	Jamaica (JAM)	36	33	16	85
2	Bahamas (BAH)	9	7	10	26
3	Trinidad and Tobago (TTO)	5	7	12	24
4	Guyana (GUY)	4	2	4	10
5	Barbados (BAR)	3	4	4	11
6	Bermuda (BER)	3	1	2	6
7	British Virgin Islands (IVB)	1	3	3	7
7	Grenada (GRN)	1	3	3	7
9	Guadeloupe (GLP)	1	1	2	4
10	Curaçao (CUW)	1	1	1	3
10	Martinique (MTQ)	1	1	1	3
12	Suriname (SUR)	1	0	1	2
13	Dominica (DMA)	0	1	2	3
14	Saint Vincent and the Grenadines (VIN)	0	0	3	3
15	Cayman Islands (CAY)	0	0	1	1
15	Saint Kitts and Nevis (SKN)	0	0	1	1
Totals (16 entries)		66	64	66	196
