= Bailey Hertenstein =

American athlete (born 2000)

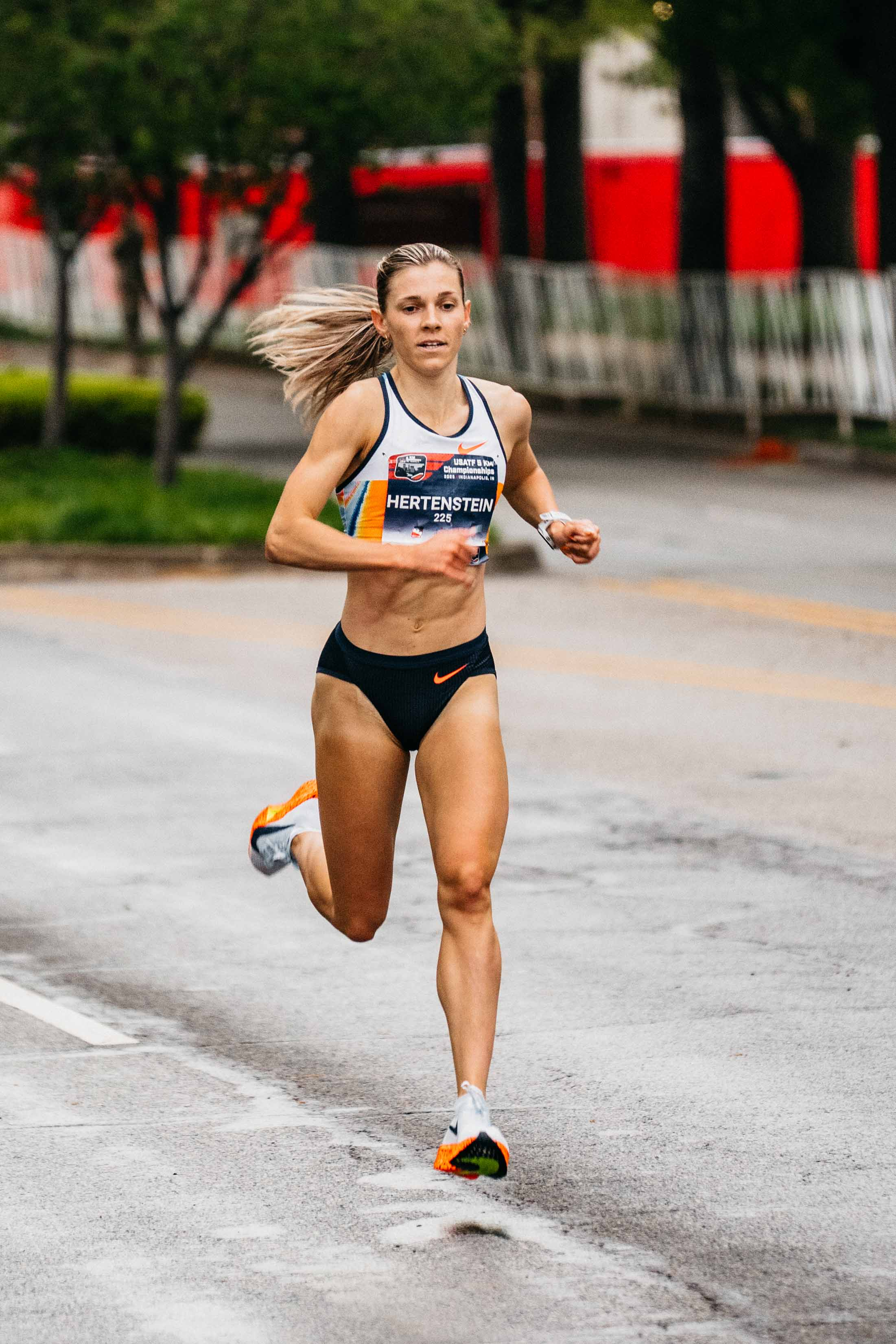
- Hertenstein in 2025

Personal information
- Born: April 20, 2000 (age 26)

Sport
- Sport: Athletics
- Event(s): Long-distance running, Cross country running

Achievements and titles
- Personal best(s): 1500m: 4:06.39 (2025); 3000m: 8:45.05 (2024); 5000m: 14:48.91 (2025); 10000m: 31:53.26 (2025); Road; 5k: 15:16 (2025)
Medal record
Representing United States
NACAC Championships
Silver medal – second place	2025 Freeport	5000 m

Bailey Hertenstein (born 20 April 2000) is an American long-distance and cross country runner. She was the silver medalist over 5000 metres representing the United States at the 2025 NACAC Championships.

== Biography ==
From Florida, Hertenstain attended Riverview High School and ran some track in middle school but had more experience in cross country running. In 2015, she set a course record in Tallahassee at the state cross country championships at Apalachee Regional Park. In May 2016, she won the Class 4A state final over 1600 metres in 5:5.14 despite falling with a lap to go after being clipped by Sinclaire Johnson, and having to run back from eighth place. The following year she won her third consecutive state cross country title and signed for the University of Indiana.

She won her first race for Indiana at the Commodore Classic in 2019. In 2020, she won the 3000 metres race at the Big Ten Indoor Championships. In 2022, she transferred to the University of Colorado. She led Colorado to the 2022 PAC-12 Cross Country Championships title.

Hertenstein missed the 2024 indoor season with injury. She made her colleague debut over 10,000 metres at the 2024 Pac-12 Conference in May, which she won in 34:21.03. She placed third behind Parker Valby and Hilda Olemomoi competing for the University of Colorado at the 2024 NCAA Outdoor Championships in 15:10.98 after a 63.18 final lap, the fastest last lap in the field by more than two seconds.

Competing indoors at the John Thomas Terrier Classic in Boston on 31 January 2025, Hertenstein ran 14:56.33 for the 5000 metres to break her outright personal best by 14 seconds.

Hertenstein placed fifth over 5000 metres at the USA Championships in August 2025. Later that month, she was a silver medalist over 5000 metres at the 2025 NACAC Championships in Freeport, The Bahamas in August 2025.
