= Austin West =

American athlete (born 2000)

Personal information
- Born: 17 March 2000 (age 26)

Sport
- Sport: Athletics
- Event: Decathlon

Achievements and titles
- Personal bests: Decathlon: 8331 (Eugene, 2023); Heptathlon: 5975 (Geneva, 2024)
Medal record
Representing United States
NACAC Championships
Gold medal – first place	2025 Freeport	Decathlon

Austin West (born 17 March 2000) is an American multi-event athlete. He won the decathlon at the 2025 NACAC Championships.

== Biography ==
From Iowa, he participated in sported from a young age, playing soccer and whilst attending Iowa City West High School he played American football and baseball as well as participating in track and field. Initially a sprinter, West won state titles in the 400 metres and the 400 hurdles in 2018, the year he graduated high school.

He went on to become a six-time All-American in the decathlon and heptathlon at the University of Iowa. He was a first team All-American in the heptathlon in 2024 indoors, and decathlon in 2022 and 2023. He was also the 2023 Big Ten champion in the 400 hurdles.

Competing outside college competitions, West scored 8,179 points to finish in second place in the decathlon at the 2022 Mt. SAC Relays in Walnut, California. He earned third place at the 2023 USA Outdoor Track and Field Championships, finishing the competition with a 4:20.98 personal best in the 1500 metres to achieve a personal best tally of 8,331 points. He placed sixth in the decathlon at the US Olympic Trials in Eugene, Oregon in June 2024.

He scored 8162 points to place fourth at the 2025 USA Outdoor Track and Field Championships in Eugene. He won the decathlon competing for the United States at the 2025 NACAC Championships in Freeport, The Bahamas, with a championship record tally of 8,038 points, overtaking Bahamian Kendrick Thompson after the 1500 metres race at the end of the competition. He finished twelfth overall in the season-long World Athletics Combined Events Tour for 2025.
