= Kimar Farquharson =

Jamaican athlete (born 2001)

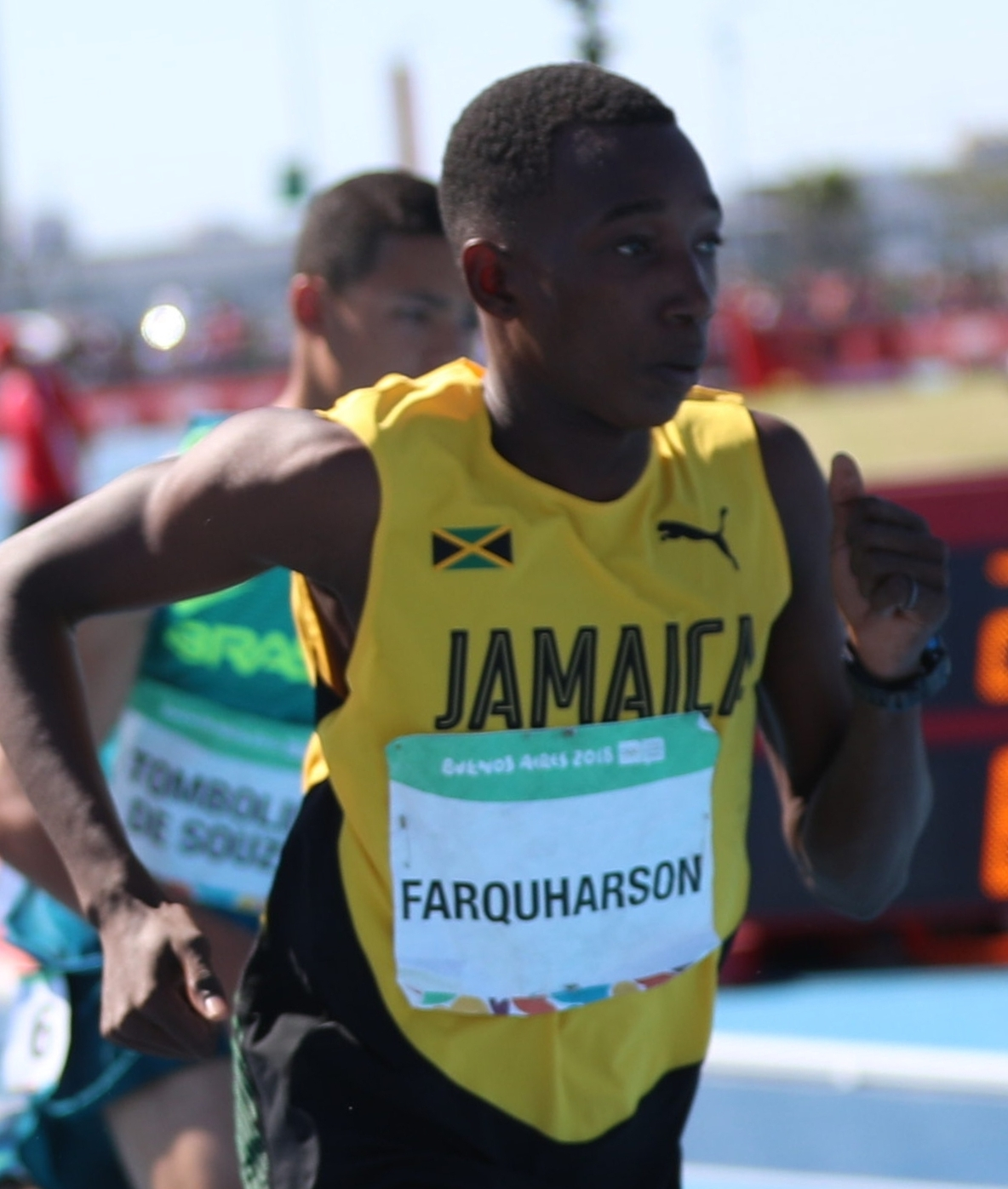
- Farquharson at the 2018 Summer Youth Olympics

Personal information
- Nationality: Jamaica
- Born: 20 May 2001 (age 25)
- Home town: St. Elizabeth, Jamaica

Sport
- Sport: Track and Field
- Event: 400m 800m
- University team: Texas A&M Aggies

Achievements and titles
- Personal bests: 400m: 45.18 (2026); 800m: 1.45:99 (2025)
Medal record
Men's athletics
Representing Jamaica
World Indoor Championships
| Silver medal – second place | 2025 Nanjing | 4x400 m relay |
| Bronze medal – third place | 2026 Toruń | 4×400 m relay |
Carifta Games Junior (U20)
| Gold medal – first place | 2019 George Town | 800 metres |
| Gold medal – first place | 2017 Willemstad | 800 metres |
| Bronze medal – third place | 2018 Nassau | 800 metres |

Kimar Farquharson (born 20 May 2001) is a Jamaican runner.

== Biography ==
Kimar attended Calabar High School in St. Andrew, Jamaica. He won the gold medal in the 800 metres at the 2019 CARIFTA Games in Grand Cayman.

== 2023 ==
Competing for South Plains College he was runner-up to compatriot Tyrice Taylor at the 2023 National Junior College Athletic Association Division I Outdoor Championships in New Mexico, over 800 metres.

== 2024 ==
Running for Texas A&M University, he won the men's 800m title at the Tom Jones Memorial in Gainesville, Florida in April 2024, leading home a Jamaica 1-2-3 in a time of 1:46.69, narrowly beating Jamaican national record holder Navasky Anderson, with Tarees Rhoden in third. He was a member of the Texas A&M University team which ran a time of 2:58.37 minutes in the men's 4 × 400 m relay to win the 2024 NCAA Outdoor Athletics Championships in Eugene, Oregon in June 2024.

== 2025 ==
He won the men's indoors 800 metres at the Ted Nelson Invitational running for Texas A&M University in a time of 1:48.73 seconds in January 2025. He won a silver medal in the men's 4 x 400 metres relay at the 2025 World Athletics Indoor Championships in Nanjing. He placed second with the Texas A&M relay team at the 2025 NCAA Championships.

== 2026 ==
He was selected to represent Jamaica at the 2026 World Athletics Indoor Championships in Toruń, Poland. He ran as the Jamaican team initially finished third in the inaugural mixed 4 × 400 m relay at a World Athletics Indoor Championships, running alongside Leah Anderson, Shana Kaye Anderson and Delano Kennedy, but the team were later disqualified from an incident-filled race which saw Dutch and American runners fall, and Sara Reifenrath of the United States run her leg of the race with only one shoe, with Jamaica disqualified for exchanging positions before a baton exchange. On the final day of the championships, he ran in the men's 4 x 400 metres with the team winning the bronze medal. In May, at the NCAA West Regionals in Fayetteville, Farquharson ran a personal best 45.18 seconds for the 400 metres and qualified for the 2026 NCAA Outdoor Championships. He was named in the Jamaica team for the 2026 Central American and Caribbean Games.
