= Ryiem Forde =

Jamaican athlete

Personal information
- Nationality: Jamaican
- Born: 23 May 2001 (age 25)

Sport
- Sport: Athletics
- Event: Sprints
- Club: Empire Athletics

Achievements and titles
- Personal bests: 60m: 6.60 (NY, 2024) 100m: 9.95 (Budapest, 2023)
Medal record
Men's athletics
Representing Jamaica
World Championships
Bronze medal – third place	2023 Budapest	4×100 m relay
NACAC Championships
Silver medal – second place	2025 Freeport	100 m
Silver medal – second place	2025 Freeport	4 × 100 m relay

Ryiem Forde (born 23 May 2001) born is a Jamaican track and field athlete who competes as a sprinter. In July 2023, he was runner-up in the Jamaican national championship over 100 metres.

== Early life ==
Forde attended Jamaica College in Kingston, Jamaica.

== Career ==
In May 2023, Forde ran a new personal best time for the 100 metres of 10.07 seconds in Atlanta, finishing behind compatriot Oblique Seville.

In July 2023, he was runner-up in the Jamaican national championship 100 metres. In doing this, he ran a new personal best time of 9.96 seconds for the 100 metres.

He was selected for the 2023 World Athletics Championships in Budapest in August 2023. He qualified for the final of the 100m, where he finished eighth.

In April 2024, he was selected as part of the Jamiacan team for the 2024 World Athletics Relays in Nassau, The Bahamas.

He ran 9.98 seconds to finish fourth in the 100 metres at the 2025 Jamaican Athletics Championships. was named in the Jamaican squad for the 2025 NACAC Championships where he won the silver medal in the 100 metres in a time of 10.01 seconds. In September 2025, he competed in the men's 4 x 100 metres at the 2025 World Championships in Tokyo, Japan.
