= Kemba Nelson =

Jamaican sprinter

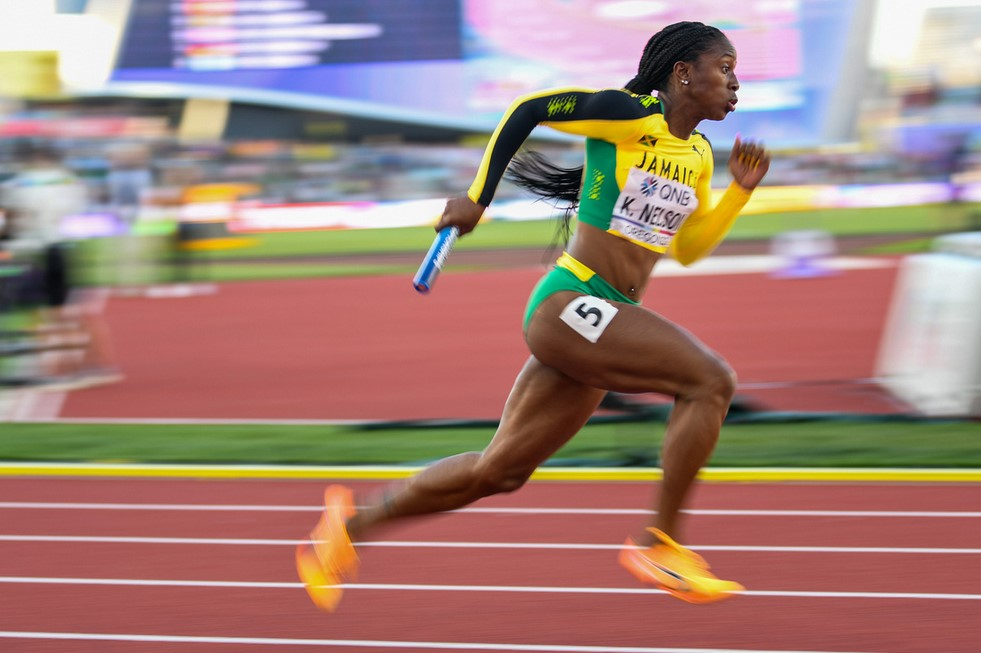
- Nelson at the 2022 World Athletics Championships

Personal information
- Born: 23 February 2000 (age 26)
- Home town: Montego Bay, Jamaica

Sport
- Country: Jamaica
- Sport: Track and field
- Event: Sprints
- College team: Oregon Ducks (2021); UTech (2018–2020)
- Club: 1.Elite Performance Track Club; 2. Hurdles & Mechanics
- Coached by: Curtis Taylor (Oregon Ducks); Paul Francis (UTech); Reynaldo Walcott (Elite Performance)

Achievements and titles
- Personal bests: 60 m: 7.05 (2021); 100 m: 10.88 (2022); 200 m: 22.74 (2022)
Medal record
Women's athletics
Representing Jamaica
World Championships
| Silver medal – second place | 2022 Eugene | 4×100 m relay |
Commonwealth Games
| Silver medal – second place | 2022 Birmingham | 4×100 m relay |
Carifta Games Junior (U20)
| Gold medal – first place | 2019 George Town | 4x100 meters relay |
| Bronze medal – third place | 2019 George Town | 100 meters |

Kemba Nelson (born 23 February 2000) is a Jamaican sprinter competing for the Oregon Ducks in American collegiate track and field. She is the collegiate record holder in the women's 60 metres with a time of 7.05 seconds, which she set when winning the final at the NCAA Division I Indoor Championships in March 2021.

== Athletics career ==
=== Mount Alvernia High and the University of Technology ===
Nelson first started competing in track and field at Mount Alvernia High School in Montego Bay, Jamaica—a school not known for its track and field program—coached by Lawrence Mendez her first year and later Andrew Henry. In her last year (2017) she was second in the class 2 (15–16 years) girls' 100 metres and fourth in the 200 metres at the Jamaican high school Boys and Girls Championships.

Nelson then attended the University of Technology (UTech) in Jamaica from 2018 to 2020, where she was coached by Paul Francis at the MVP Track and Field Club. In her first year she placed third in the women's 100 metres at the 2018 Jamaican Under-20 Championships and ran on the 4 × 100 metres relay at the 2018 World Under-20 Championships, though the Jamaican team was unable to advance after being disqualified in the semi-finals for stepping out of their lane.

In 2019 she qualified to represent Jamaica in the under-20 category for the CARIFTA Games. She placed third in the women's 100 metres and teamed up with 100 metres champion Briana Williams, Kimone Reid, and 100 metres hurdles champion Ackera Nugent in the 4 × 100 metres relay, anchoring the team to gold. At the Jamaican Under-20 Championships she won the women's 100 metres and 200 metres in personal best times of 11.49 and 23.57 seconds respectively, and then went on to be a 100 metres finalist for Jamaica at both the Pan American Under-20 Championships and the North American, Central American, and Caribbean Under-23 Championships.

=== Oregon transfer and 2021 indoor season ===
Because of the COVID-19 pandemic, Nelson barely competed and spent most of 2020 addressing injuries instead. She also wanted more competition than she thought the Jamaican intercollegiate scene could provide, so in October 2020 she transferred to the American University of Oregon in Eugene, Oregon on an athletic scholarship for the Oregon Ducks, coached by Curtis Taylor. In her first indoor meet (Razorback Invitational) for the Oregon Ducks on 30 January 2021, she placed second in the 200 metres with a personal best time of 23.53 seconds, and then defeated the 2019 NCAA Division I champion and collegiate leader Twanisha Terry over 60 metres in a time of 7.19 seconds.

On 13 March at the 2021 NCAA Division I Indoor Championships she improved in the women's 60 metres semi-finals with a time of 7.13 seconds, though Terry remained the favorite after she too improved her personal best to 7.09 seconds. However, Nelson again defeated Terry in the final with a collegiate record of 7.05 seconds, the second fastest time in the world that year. Nelson was surprised by the performance which gave more confidence to herself as well as her high school alma mater, though Mount Alvernia coach Andrew Henry was not surprised by the win, telling The Gleaner after the race: "It doesn't matter where she's at, from the moment she in a final, her aim is always to win and it doesn't matter who's she's up against, she's focused on what her objectives are".

=== 2021 outdoor season ===
Nelson started the outdoor season on 27 March with her first sub-23 seconds (though wind-assisted with +2.5 m/s wind velocity) 200 metres race with a time of 22.79 seconds to win at the Aztec Invitational in San Diego. She competed at the USATF Grand Prix in the University of Oregon's renovated Hayward Field on 24 April, winning her 100 metres semi final in a wind-assisted (+2.4 m/s wind velocity) time of 11.08 seconds ahead of Olympic champions Allyson Felix and Tianna Bartoletta. In the final Nelson finished fifth in 11.22 seconds, several meters behind Blessing Okagbare who won in 10.97 seconds, but Nelson didn't expect to win her semi-final and called it a "very, very good experience".

On 27 May, at the 2021 NCAA West Preliminary in College Station, Texas for the 2021 NCAA Division I Championships, Nelson lead the first round results with her first sub-11 seconds race with a time of 10.91 seconds. The wind was again over the limit for record purposes at +2.1 m wind, but she again ran under 11 seconds two days later in the quarter-finals with a 10.98 seconds personal best in almost still conditions (+0.1 m/s wind), qualifying for the 2021 NCAA Division I Championships in June.

=== 2022 - and beyond ===
During the 2022 season, she won 4 x 100 metres relay medals at the 2022 Commonwealth Games in Birmingham, England and the 2022 World Athletics Championships in Eugene, Oregon. Jamaica received silver after originally finishing third owing to one Nigerian member doping violation and stripping of the gold medal.

== Personal life ==
Nelson is an undergrad at the University of Oregon studying applied economics, business and society, and plans to pursue a master's degree in finance. She graduated from university and is now a professional athlete.

== Athletics achievements ==
Information from her World Athletics profile unless otherwise noted.

=== Personal bests ===
| Type | Distance | Time (s) | Wind (m/s) | Venue | Date | Notes |
Individual events
| Indoor | 60 metres | 7.05 | —N/a | Fayetteville, United States | 13 March 2021 | |
| Indoor | 200 metres sh | 23.41 | —N/a | Chicago, United States | 11 February 2022 | |
| Outdoor | 100 metres | 10.88 | +0.9 | Kingston, Jamaica | 24 June 2022 | |
| Outdoor | 200 metres | 22.74 | +0.1 | Eugene, United States | 15 May 2022 | |
Team events
| Outdoor | 4 × 100 metres relay | 41.18 | —N/a | Eugene, United States | 23 July 2022 | |

=== International competitions ===
Representing Jamaica
| Year | Competition | Venue | Position | Event | Time | Notes |
|---|---|---|---|---|---|---|
| 2018 | World U20 Championships | Tampere, Finland | — | 4 × 100 m relay | DQ | TR17.2.3 |
| 2019 | CARIFTA Games | George Town, Cayman Islands | 3rd | 100 m | 11.68 | |
| 2019 | CARIFTA Games | George Town, Cayman Islands | 1st | 4 × 100 m relay | 44.25 | |
| 2019 | NACAC U23 Championships | Querétaro, Mexico | 8th | 100 m | 13.75 | |
| 2019 | Pan American U20 Championships | San José, Costa Rica | — | 100 m | DNS | |
| 2022 | World Championships | Eugene, United States | 19th (sf) | 100 m | 11.25 | |
| 2022 | World Championships | Eugene, United States | 2nd | 4 × 100 m relay | 41.18 | SB |
| 2022 | Commonwealth Games | Birmingham, United Kingdom | 2nd | 4 × 100 m relay | 43.08 | |
| 2024 | Olympic Games | Paris, France | 5th | 4 × 100 m relay | 42.29 | SB |

=== Circuit performances ===
Grand Slam Track results
| Slam | Race group | Event | Pl. | Time | Prize money |
|---|---|---|---|---|---|
| 2025 Kingston Slam | Short sprints | 100 m | 5th | 11.37 | US$25,000 |
| 2025 Kingston Slam | Short sprints | 200 m | 4th | 23.84 | US$25,000 |
