= Aasia Laurencin =

Saint Lucian hurdler (born 2002)

Personal information
- Born: 1 September 2002 (age 24) Oak Park, Michigan, U. S.
- Height: 177.8 cm (5 ft 10 in)

Sport
- Sport: Athletics
- Event: Hurdles

Achievements and titles
- Personal bests: 60m hurdles: 7.97 (Indianapolis, 2025); 100m hurdles: 12.69 (Windsor, Canada,2025)
Medal record
Representing Saint Lucia
NACAC Championships
Bronze medal – third place	2025 Freeport	100 m hurdles

Aasia Laurencin (born 1 September 2002) is a Saint Lucian hurdler.

== Early life ==
She attended Oak Park High School, and trained at the Motor City Track Club in Michigan. Initially she was a high jumper, before switching to hurdles. She was a 12-time AAU All-American, three-time state champion in the 60m hurdles and an 18-time Michigan All-State honoree.

== Career ==
She finished sixth at the 2024 NCAA Division I Indoor Track and Field Championships in the 60 metres hurdles, and sixth in the 100 metres hurdles at the 2024 NCAA Division I Outdoor Track and Field Championships.

Competing for the University of Michigan Wolverines in 2025, she set the national record for the 60m hurdles twice. She lowered it to 8.04 seconds in February 2025, before running 7.97 seconds at the Big Ten Championships. She finished in sixth place of the 60 metres hurdles in the final of the 2025 NCAA Division I Indoor Track and Field Championships, held in Virginia Beach, Virginia.

She was named as the sole representative in the Saint Lucian team for the 2025 World Athletics Indoor Championships in Nanjing in March 2025, where she qualified for the semi-finals of the 60 metres hurdles. She was a bronze medalist in the 100 metres hurdles at the 2025 NACAC Championships in Freeport, The Bahamas in 13.04 seconds (-1.1). She subsequently competed at the 2025 World Athletics Championships in Tokyo, Japan.

== Personal life ==
She is the granddaughter of former St Jude Hospital chief surgeon Denis Laurencin. She attended the University of Texas - Austin before becoming a grad student of sociology at the University of Michigan.
