= Agur Dwol =

American triple jumper

Personal information
- Born: 16 July 2004 (age 21)

Sport
- Sport: Athletics
- Event: Triple jump

Achievements and titles
- Personal best(s): Triple jump: 13.80m (Lexington, 2025)
Medal record
Women's athletics
Representing United States
NACAC Championships
| Bronze medal – third place | 2025 Freeport | Triple jump |
Pan American U20 Championships
| Bronze medal – third place | 2023 Mayagüez | Triple jump |

Agur Dwol (born 16 July 2004) is an American triple jumper. She represented the United States at the 2025 World Athletics Championships.

== Early life ==
She attended Mullen High School, in Denver, Colorado. Prior to graduation in 2022, she set a Colorado state triple jump high school record and won her third Colorado state high school title in the triple jump before attending the University of Oklahoma.

== Career ==
She was a bronze medalist at the 2023 Pan American U20 Athletics Championships with a triple jump of 12.75 metres in Mayagüez, Puerto Rico.

She was runner-up to Jasmine Moore in the triple jump final with a jump of 13.76 metres at the 2025 USA Outdoor Track and Field Championships. She was a bronze medalist in the triple jump at the 2025 NACAC Championships in Freeport, The Bahamas in August 2025 with a best jump of 13.30 metres. In September 2025, she competed at the 2025 World Championships in Tokyo, Japan, without advancing to the final.
