= Gabrielle Matthews =

Jamaican athlete (born 2002)

Personal information
- Nationality: Jamaica
- Born: 14 October 2002 (age 24)
- Home town: Portmore, Jamaica

Sport
- Sport: Athletics
- Event: Sprint
- College team: Ole Miss Landsharks; Florida Gators

Achievements and titles
- Personal bests: 60m: 7.19 (Arkansas, 2026); 100m 10.97 (Alabama, 2026); 200m: 22.41 (Florida, 2026); 400m Hurdles: 55.12 (Gainesville, 2024)
Medal record
Women's athletics
Representing Jamaica
NACAC Championships
Bronze medal – third place	2025 Freeport	200 m

Gabrielle Matthews (born 14 October 2002) is a Jamaican sprinter. She finished runner-up over 200 metres at the Jamaican Athletics Championships in 2025 and the 2026 NCAA Division I Indoor Track and Field Championships.

== Early life ==
She attended Hydel High School in St Catherine Parish, before later attending Queen's School, Jamaica.

== Career ==
=== 2024 ===
In May 2024, as a sophomore at the University of Mississippi she won the women's 400 metres hurdles title in a personal best time of 55.12 seconds at the Southeastern Conference Championships in Gainesville, Florida, to become the first female athlete win the title for the university. She was a member of the Ole Miss women's 4 x 100 metres relay team alongside Akilah Lewis, McKenzie Long, and Jahniya Bowers, running the third leg, as they won the NCAA Outdoor Championships in June 2024 in a time of 42.34 seconds. It was the first national title in a relay, male or female, for the programme. She also reached the final of the 400 metres hurdles at the championships, placing seventh overall. She was a finalist in the 400 metres hurdles at the 2024 Jamaican Athletics Championships, placing eighth overall.

=== 2025 ===
The following year, she transferred to the University of Florida. Competing for the Florida Gators, she reached the final of the 200 metres at the NCAA Outdoor Championships in June 2025, with a personal best 22.59 seconds in the semi-final before placing eighth in the final. Later that month, she qualified from her 200 metres semi-final behind Ashanti Moore at the 2025 Jamaican Athletics Championships before returning the following day to claim second place overall, again behind Moore. She was named in the Jamaican squad for the 2025 NACAC Championships in Freeport, The Bahamas, winning the bronze medal in the 200 metres. In September 2025, she competed in the 200 metres at the 2025 World Championships in Tokyo, Japan placing 7th in the heats.

=== 2026 ===
Competing at the 2026 NCAA Division I Indoor Track and Field Championships, Matthews qualified for the final of the 200 metres running an indoor personal best time of 22.71 seconds, before lowering it again to 22.55 seconds to place second in the final. In May, Matthews won the 100 m at the SEC Championships in a 10.97 personal best. In June, she qualified for the 2026 NCAA Outdoor Championships.
