= Anthaya Charlton =

Bahamian long jumper (born 2003)

Personal information
- Born: 28 July 2003 (age 23)

Sport
- Sport: Athletics
- Events: Long jump, Sprint

Achievements and titles
- Personal bests: 100 m: 10.87 (Eugene, 2025); Long jump: 6.98m (Fayetteville, 2025) NR
Medal record
Representing Bahamas
NACAC Championships
Bronze medal – third place	2025 Freeport	100 m

Anthaya Charlton (born 28 July 2003) is a Bahamian long jumper and sprinter. In 2024, she became national champion in the long jump and in 2025 set an outright national record in the event. She placed sixth in the long jump at the 2025 World Indoor Championships and was a semi-finalist in the 100 metres at the 2025 World Championships.

== Biography ==
In June 2024, she became Bahamian national champion with a long jump of 5.99 metres. She competed in the NCAA, first representing the Kentucky Wildcats track and field team.

Competing for the University of Florida, she set a Bahamian long jump record of 6.98m at the Razorback Invitational on 31 January 2025 in Fayetteville, Arkansas, breaking the previous national record of 6.82m which belonged to Daphne Saunders from 1994. The mark was also placed her the second in the all-time list of the women's NCAA indoor long jump, surpassing the previous faculty record of 6.93m set by American 2024 Olympian champion Tara Davis-Woodhall in 2021, and behind only Jasmine Moore.

She ran a personal best 7.24 seconds for the 60 metres at the SEC Indoor Championships in February 2025. She finished sixth in the long jump on her global competition debut at the 2025 World Athletics Indoor Championships in Nanjing, China on 23 March 2025, with a best jump of 6.57 metres.

She ran 11.12 seconds to win the 100 metres at the Tom Jones Invitational in Gainesville, Florida ahead of Tima Godbless on 19 April 2025. The following month she won the long jump and finished third in the 100 metres at the SEC Championships. She ran a personal best 10.87 seconds in the semi-finals of the 100 metres at the NCAA Championships in Eugene, Oregon in June 2025. She finished fourth in the NCAA Outdoor Championships final over 100 metres in a time of 11.19 seconds.

She was a bronze medalist in the 100 metres at the 2025 NACAC Championships in Freeport, The Bahamas in 11.12 seconds (+0.1). Charlton was a semi-finalist in the women's 100 metres at the 2025 World Athletics Championships in Tokyo, Japan in September 2025.

In July 2026, she represented Bahamas in the long jump at the 2026 Commonwealth Games in Glasgow, Scotland.

== Personal life ==
Her sister is fellow athlete Devynne Charlton.
