= Wendell Miller =

Bahamian sprinter (born 2003)

Wendall Miller
Personal information
- Born: 3 January 2003 (age 23)
Medal record
Athletics
Representing Bahamas
NACAC Championships
Bronze medal – third place	2022 Freeport	4×400 m relay
Bronze medal – third place	2025 Freeport	400 m
CARIFTA Games Junior (U17)
Gold medal – first place	2019 George Town	400 meters
Silver medal – second place	2019 George Town	4×100 meters relay

Wendall Miller (born 3 January 2003) is a Bahamian sprinter who competes in the 200 and 400 metres. He attended St.Johns College in Nassau, Bahamas where he won multiple Bahamas Association of Independent Secondary Schools Track and Field "B.A.I.S.S" gold medals. After a break out 2021 season he signed a professional contract with Puma, and will be training with MVP International, under former Auburn University coach Henry Rolle based in Boca Raton, Florida. He holds the Bahamian 400m Jr National Record with a time of 45.81. He also has a personal best of 20.61 (+1.1w) over 200m.

During the 2019 Carifta Games held in the Cayman Islands he won gold in the under 17 400m before teaming up to secure silver in the 4×100 relay. He also competed in the 100m and 200m at the 2021 World Athletics U20 Championships in Nairobi, Kenya.

== Personal bests ==
Event	Time	Venue	Date
100 m	10.45 (+0.4)	Nairobi, Kenya	18 March 2021
200 m	20.61 (+1.1)	Satellite Beach, Florida	16 July 2021
400m	45.12	Freeport, The Bahamas	17 August 2025
