= Jayden Brown =

Australian equestrian

Personal information
- Born: 14 June 1988 (age 37); Brisbane, Australia

Sport
- Country: Australia
- Sport: Equestrian

Achievements and titles
- Olympic finals: 2024 Olympic Games
- World finals: Herning 2022

Jayden Brown (born 14 June 1988 in Brisbane) is an Australian equestrian athlete. He competed in dressage at the 2022 FEI World Championships in Herning, Denmark and at the 2013 World Breeding Championships. In July 2024, Brown was selected by the Australian Equestrian Federation to represent the Australian team at the 2024 Summer Olympics in Paris, France. He finished 10th in the team competition with the Australian team.
