= Nikaoli Williams =

Jamaican athlete (born 2000)

Personal information
- Nationality: Jamaican
- Born: 7 October 2000 (age 26)
- Home town: Portmore, Jamaica

Sport
- Sport: Athletics
- Event: Long jump
- College team: Oklahoma Sooners

Achievements and titles
- Personal best: Long jump: 8.16m (2025)
Medal record
Men's athletics
Representing Jamaica
NACAC Championships
Gold medal – first place	2025 Freeport	Long jump

Nikaoli Williams (born 7 October 2000) is a Jamaican long jumper. He won the gold medal at the 2025 NACAC Championships.

== Early life ==
He attended Calabar High School in Kingston, Jamaica, before later studying at the University of Oklahoma in the United States.

== Career ==
He won the Big 12 Indoor Track and Field Championships in February 2023, with a jump of 7.73 metres whilst competing for the University of Oklahoma. He subsequently competed at the 2023 NCAA Division I Indoor Track and Field Championships and had a placing of eleventh overall. In May, he also won the 2023 Big 12 Outdoor Championships with a jump of 7.80 metres in Oklahoma.

He qualified for the 2024 NCAA Division I Outdoor Track and Field Championships with a third-place finish in his regional championships. He then placed eighth overall in the final of the Championships with a best jump of 7.76 metres. Earlier that year he had also made appearance at the 2024 NCAA Indoor Championships, but had failed to achieve a legal jump.

He jumped 7.89 metres to finish second in the men's long jump at the South-East Conference indoor championships at Texas in February 2025, whilst competing for the University of Oklahoma. He was then runner-up to Kelsey Daniel at the 2025 NCAA Division I Indoor Track and Field Championships on 14 March 2025 in Virginia Beach with a jump of 7.96 metres.

In June 2025, he placed third overall at the Jamaican Athletics Championships in Kingston, with a jump of 7.82 metres. In August 2025, he won the gold medal in the long jump at the 2025 NACAC Championships in Freeport, The Bahamas with a jump of 8.16 metres. This came after he was a late replacement into the Jamaican team for Carey McLeod. In September 2025, he competed at the 2025 World Championships in Tokyo, Japan, qualifying for the final and placing ninth overall.

On 20 June 2026, Williams jumped 7.97 metres to place third overall at the 2026 Jamaican Championships. He was named in the Jamaica team for the 2026 Central American and Caribbean Games.
