= Tyrice Taylor =

Jamaican athlete (born 2001)

Personal information
- Nationality: Jamaica
- Born: 31 October 2001 (age 25) Linstead, Jamaica

Sport
- Sport: Track and Field
- Event: Middle-distance running
- University team: Arkansas Razorbacks

Achievements and titles
- Personal bests: Outdoor; 800 m: 1:43.74 (Freeport, 2025); Indoor; 800 m: 1:46.00 (Fayetteville, 2026)
Medal record
Men's athletics
Representing Jamaica
World Indoor Championships
Bronze medal – third place	2026 Toruń	4 × 400 m relay
NACAC Championships
Bronze medal – third place	2025 Freeport	800 m
Carifta Games Junior (U20)
Silver medal – second place	2019 George Town	800 meters

Tyrice Taylor (born 31 October 2001) is a Jamaican middle-distance runner. He won the Jamaican national title over 800 metres in 2025, and that year held the national record for the distance before becoming a semi-finalist at the 2025 World Athletics Championships and winning the 2026 NCAA Indoor Championships.

== Early life ==
He attended The Enid Bennett High School in Saint Catherine Parish and Vere Technical high school. In 2018 he won over 800 metres at the ISSA/GraceKennedy Boys and Girls Athletic Championships. He won over 800m in the boys U20 race at the Digicel Grand Prix Final at GC Foster College in 2019. He won the silver medal in the 800 metres at the 2019 CARIFTA Games in Grand Cayman.

== Career ==
Competing for Indian Hills Community College he won at the 2023 National Junior College Athletic Association Division I Outdoor Championships in New Mexico, defeating compatriot Kimar Farquharson over 800 metres in 1:46.93.

Competing for the University of Arkansas at the Tyson Invitational in Fayetteville, Arkansas in February 2025 he ran a personal best 1:46.62 to win in the men's 800m. In doing so, he was only 0.01 seconds outside the Jamaican indoor national record set in 2023 by Tarees Rhoden.

He finished second in the men's 800m elite invitational race at the Mount SAC Relays in Walnut, California in April 2023, running a new personal best time of 1:45.81 to move into the top-ten Jamaican all-time list for the event.

== 2025 ==
He qualified for the final of the men's 800m at the 2025 NCAA Outdoor Championships in Eugene, Oregon in a personal best 1:45.23 in June 2025. In the final he placed eighth in a time of 1:47.44. Later that month, he won the 800 metres final of the 2025 Jamaican Athletics Championships in Kingston, Jamaica in a time of 1:45.26. He ran 1:46.46 to finish second behind Canada's Abdullahi Hassan at the Ed Murphey Track Classic, a World Athletics Continental Tour Silver meet, on 12 July in Memphis, Tennessee.

Taylor was named in the Jamaican squad for the 2025 NACAC Championships in Nassau, The Bahamas, winning the bronze medal in the 800 metres in a new personal best time of 1:43.74, which broke the Jamaican national record in the event, surpassing the previous mark held by Navasky Anderson. He was a semi-finalist at the 2025 World Athletics Championships in Tokyo, Japan, in September 2025 in the men's 800 metres alongside Anderson, as for the first time Jamaica had two semi-finalists in the event at the Championships, with Anderson then regaining the Jamaican national record in the semi-final.

== 2026 ==
On 14 February 2026, Taylor set a new Jamaican indoor 800 metres record of 1:46.11 at the Tyson Invitational in Fayetteville. However, that record was broken a few days later in Fayetteville by Rivaldo Marshall. Competing at the 2026 NCAA Division I Indoor Track and Field Championships, he won the final of the 800 metres in a Jamaican one-two finish ahead of Marshall, running an indoor personal best or 1:46.00.

Taylor was selected to represent Jamaica at the 2026 World Athletics Indoor Championships in Toruń, Poland, running in the men's 4 x 400 metres with the relay team winning the bronze medal. In May, he ran 1:45.71 to place third over 800 m at the SEC Championships. That month, he ran 1:44.35 to win the 800 m at the West Regional NCAA Championships. In June, he qualified from the preliminary round of the 2026 NCAA Championships in 1:46.98, before placing second in the final in 1:44.30, his points helping Arkansas to win the team title.
