= Bovel McPherson =

Jamaican athlete

Personal information
- Nationality: Jamaican
- Born: 25 February 2001 (age 25)

Sport
- Sport: Athletics
- Event: Sprint

Achievements and titles
- Personal bests: 400m: 44.51 (Tokyo, 2025)
Medal record
Men's athletics
Representing Jamaica
NACAC Championships
| Gold medal – first place | 2025 Freeport | 4 × 400 m relay |
| Gold medal – first place | 2025 Freeport | 4x400m Mixed |
Pan American U20 Championships
| Bronze medal – third place | 2019 San José | 400 m |
| Silver medal – second place | 2019 San José | 4 × 400 m relay |

Bovel McPherson (born 25 February 2001) is a Jamaican sprinter.

== Early life ==
He attended Holmwood Technical High School in Manchester, Jamaica.

== Career ==
He won the bronze medal in the men's 400m at the 2019 Pan American U20 Athletics Championships in Costa Rica. At the Championships, he was also part of the Jamaican 4 × 400 m relay team which broke a 17-year-old age-group national record with a new time of 3:00.99 minutes for the silver medal behind the United States team.

Competing for New Mexico Junior College, he broke the National Junior College (NJCAA) Indoor and Indoor Championships 400m record when he ran an indoor personal best of 45.58 seconds in Lubbock, in March 2025. Later that year, McPherson lowered his personal best in 400m outdoors with a school programme record of 44.78 seconds, again in Lubbock.

He was a gold medalist at the 2025 NACAC Championships in Freeport, The Bahamas in both the mixed 4x400 metres relay and men's 4x400 metres relay.

He was selected for the Jamaican team for the 2025 World Athletics Championships in Tokyo, Japan, running a personal best 44.51 seconds to qualify for the 400m semi-finals, before placing sixth in his semi-final in 44.99 seconds. He also ran at the championships in the men's 4 x 400 metres relay, helping the Jamaican team qualify for the final.
