= Kaiwan Culmer =

Bahamian athlete (born 1996)

Personal information
- Born: October 25, 1996 (age 29)

Sport
- Sport: Athletics
- Event: Triple jump

Achievements and titles
- Personal best(s): Triple jump: 17.29m (Nassau, 2025)
Medal record
Men's athletics
Representing Bahamas
NACAC Championships
Gold medal – first place	2025 Freeport	Triple jump

Kaiwan Culmer (born 25 October 1996) is a Bahamian triple jumper. He won the gold medal at the 2025 NACAC Championships.

== Career ==
He competed as a youngster at the 2013 IAAF World Youth Championships where he jumped a person best of 14.92 metres in Donetsk, Ukraine. He then competed in the college system in the United States for the University of Nebraska–Lincoln.

He finished fifth in the triple jump competing at the 2018 NACAC Championships in Toronto, Canada. He finished seventh overall at the 2022 Commonwealth Games in Birmingham, England on his senior international championship debut, making a best jump of 16.04 metres in August 2022. Later that month, he finished fourth in the triple jump competing at the 2022 NACAC Championships.

He was trained by Peter Pratt prior to a switch to work with Bahamian Olympic medalist Leevan Sands in 2024. Culmer credited Sands after he jumped a new personal best of 17.00 metres the following year at the Ed Murphey Classic in Memphis, Tennessee.

In August 2025, he met the auto-qualifying standard for the 2025 World Championships jumping a new personal best of 17.29 metres with his first attempt at the BAAA Open Senior Track and Field Championships. He won the gold medal in the triple jump with a jump of 16.56 metres in the first round whilst competing at the 2025 NACAC Championships in Freeport, The Bahamas. In September 2025, he competed at the 2025 World Championships in Tokyo, Japan.

== Personal life ==
He has worked as a site manager for a construction company in The Bahamas, with the company allowing him leave to compete at international events. He left the job in October 2023 and moved his training base from New Providence to Tallahassee, Florida.
