= Kelly-Ann Beckford =

Jamaican athlete (born 2000)

Personal information
- Nationality: Jamaican
- Born: 20 April 2000 (age 26) Trelawny, Jamaica

Sport
- Sport: Athletics
- Event: 800m
- College team: Houston Cougars; Lincoln Blue Tigers
- Club: District Track Club
- Coached by: Tom Brumlik

Achievements and titles
- Personal bests: 400m: 52.25 (Annapolis, 2026); 800m: 1:58.46 (College Station, 2026); 1500m:: 4:26.20 (Houston, 2024); Indoor; 800m: 2:00.56 (Philly, PA 2026)
Medal record
Women's athletics
Representing Jamaica
NACAC Championships
Bronze medal – third place	2025 Freeport	800 m
CARIFTA Games U20
Silver medal – second place	2019 George Town	1500 m
Silver medal – second place	2019 George Town	3000 m

Kelly-Ann Beckford (born 20 April 2000) is a Jamaican middle-distance runner. She has won the Jamaican Athletics Championships over both 800 metres and 1500 metres.

== Biography ==
She attended Albert Town High School in Albert Town, Jamaica, and won at the 2015 ISSA GraceKennedy Boys and Girls' Championship, to become the first girl from the school to win at the championships. She later studied and competed in the United States at Lincoln University in Missouri, and the University of Houston.

== Career ==
In May 2022, she became the NCAA Division 2 champion for Lincoln University over 800 metres whilst training under Jamaican coach Harold “Poppy” Thomas. She won the Jamaican Athletics Championships over 1500 metres in June 2022 in Kingston, Jamaica, finishing ahead of Adelle Tracey.

== 2024 ==
In 2024, she won Big 12 Conference indoor 800 metres title for Houston with an indoor personal best, school record and Big 12 indoor record time of 2:00.99. Beckford went on to run a personal best and University of Houston outdoor programme record for the 800 metres of 2:02.88 in March 2025 at the Clyde Littlefield Texas Relays in Austin, Texas.

After graduating from Houston in 2024, she trained under Stephen Francis at the MVP Track Club.

== 2025 ==
She competed for Jamaica at the 2025 World Athletics Relays in China.

She won the Jamaican Athletics Championships over 800 metres in June 2025 in Kingston, finishing ahead of Natoya Goule-Toppin. She won the bronze medal over 800 metres at the 2025 NACAC Championships in August 2025 in Freeport, The Bahamas running a personal best time of 2:00.17. She competed in the women's 800 metres at the 2025 World Athletics Championships in Tokyo, Japan.

== 2026 ==
Beckford was selected to represent Jamaica at the 2026 World Athletics Indoor Championships in Toruń, Poland, without advancing to the semi-finals of the 800 metres. On 6 June, Beckford ran a personal best 1:58.46 for the 800 m to place second at the USATF Lone Star Grand Prix in College Station, Texas. That month, she retained her 800 metres title at the 2026 Jamaican Championships. On 16 July, she won over 800 metres at Spitzen Leichtathletik Luzern in Switzerland. She was a finalist in the 800 metres at the 2026 Commonwealth Games in Glasgow, Scotland.

== Personal Life ==
Parents are Veronica Vunon and Eric Beckford. She has five siblings, three brothers and two sisters.
