= 2025 NACAC Championships =

V NACAC Championships
- Dates: 15–17 August 2025
- Host city: Freeport, Bahamas (The Bahamas)
- Venue: Grand Bahama Sports Complex
- Level: Senior
- Events: 39
- Participation: 316 athletes from 28 nations

The 2025 North American, Central American and Caribbean Championships was a regional track and field competition held in Freeport, The Bahamas. Originally scheduled for 7–9 June 2024, it was later rescheduled to 15–17 August 2025. It was the fifth edition of a senior track and field championship for the NACAC region, held three years after the 2022 NACAC Championships.

== Medal summary ==
=== Men ===
| Event | Gold | | Silver | | Bronze | |
|---|---|---|---|---|---|---|
| 100 metres (wind: +0.4 m/s) | Jerome Blake; Canada | 9.95 CR, PB | Ryiem Forde; Jamaica | 10.01 | Rikkoi Brathwaite; British Virgin Islands | 10.15 |
| 200 metres (wind: -0.5 m/s) | Aaron Brown; Canada | 20.27 | Christopher Taylor; Jamaica | 20.32 | José Figueroa; Puerto Rico | 20.53 |
| 400 metres | Kirani James; Grenada | 44.48 CR | Rusheen McDonald; Jamaica | 45.04 | Wendell Miller; Bahamas | 45.12 PB |
| 800 metres | Handal Roban; Saint Vincent and the Grenadines | 1:42.87 CR, NR | Brandon Miller; United States | 1:43.15 PB | Tyrice Taylor; Jamaica | 1:43.74 NR |
| 1500 metres | Foster Malleck; Canada | 3:37.54 CR | Charles Philibert-Thiboutot; Canada | 3:40.57 | Carlos Vilches; Puerto Rico | 3:41.34 |
| 5000 metres | Drew Hunter; United States | 14:38.85 | Cooper Teare; United States | 14:38.89 | Héctor Pagán; Puerto Rico | 14:40.60 |
| 110 metres hurdles (wind: -1.4 m/s) | Demario Prince; Jamaica | 13.35 | Dylan Beard; United States | 13.39 | Jahiem Stern; Jamaica | 13.63 |
| 400 metres hurdles | CJ Allen; United States | 48.22 | Malik James-King; Jamaica | 48.28 | Assinie Wilson; Jamaica | 48.75 |
| 3000 metres steeplechase | Daniel Michalski; United States | 8:14.07 CR, PB | Aaron Ahl; Canada | 8:17.17 PB | Kenneth Rooks; United States | 8:26.52 |
| 4 × 100 metres relay | Aaron Brown; Jerome Blake; Brendon Rodney; Eliezer Adjibi; Canada | 38.05 CR | Ashanie Smith; Kadrian Goldson; Ryiem Forde; Christopher Taylor; Jamaica | 38.53 | Adam Musgrove; Terrence Jones; Ian Kerr; Wanya McCoy; Bahamas | 38.57 |
| 4 × 400 metres relay | Bovel McPherson; Zandrian Barnes; Delano Kennedy; Rusheen McDonald; Jamaica | 3:02.86 | Edgar Ramírez; Guilermo Campos; Valente Mendoza; Luis Aviles; Mexico | 3:05.40 | Shaquane Toussaint; Jayden Phillip; Joshem Sylvester; Michael Francois; Grenada | 3:07.94 |
| 20,000 metres walk | Erick Barrondo; Guatemala | 1:28:54.12 | José Ortiz; Guatemala | 1:28:55.32 | Nick Christie; United States | 1:32:15.28 |
| High jump | Tyus Wilson; United States | 2.24 m | Donald Thomas Jr. Bahamas | 2.21 m | Luis Castro; Puerto Rico | 2.21 m |
| Long jump | Nikaoli Williams; Jamaica | 8.16 m | Will Williams; United States | 7.96 m | Shawn-D Thompson; Jamaica | 7.87 m |
| Triple jump | Kaiwan Culmer; Bahamas | 16.56 m | Andy Hechavarría Salazar; Cuba | 16.45 m | Will Claye; United States | 16.36 m |
| Shot put | Josh Awotunde; United States | 21.68 m CR | Uziel Muñoz; Mexico | 20.89 m | Juan Carley Vázquez; Cuba | 20.68 m |
| Discus throw | Fedrick Dacres; Jamaica | 65.10 m | Sam Mattis; United States | 64.06 m | Chad Wright; Jamaica | 62.85 m |
| Hammer throw | Daniel Haugh; United States | 77.08 m | Rudy Winkler; United States | 76.87 m | Jerome Vega; Puerto Rico | 74.95 m |
| Javelin throw | Curtis Thompson; United States | 87.24 m CR | Dash Sirmon; United States | 77.04 m | Elvis Graham; Jamaica | 76.69 m |
| Decathlon | Austin West; United States | 8038 pts CR | Kendrick Thompson; Bahamas | 7515 pts | Kenny Moxey Jr. Bahamas | 6412 pts |

=== Women ===
| Event | Gold | | Silver | | Bronze | |
|---|---|---|---|---|---|---|
| 100 metres (wind: +0.1 m/s) | Jonielle Smith; Jamaica | 11.05 | Liranyi Alonso; Dominican Republic | 11.10 | Anthaya Charlton; Bahamas | 11.12 |
| 200 metres (wind: -0.6 m/s) | Anthonique Strachan; Bahamas | 22.77 | Miriam Sánchez Tapia; Mexico | 22.87 | Gabrielle Matthews; Jamaica | 23.02 |
| 400 metres | Nickisha Pryce; Jamaica | 49.95 | Wadeline Venlogh; Haiti | 50.23 NR | Lynna Irby-Jackson; United States | 50.47 |
| 800 metres | Nia Akins; United States | 1:59.75 | Shafiqua Maloney; Saint Vincent and the Grenadines | 1:59.98 | Kelly-Ann Beckford; Jamaica | 2:00.17 PB |
| 1500 metres | Emily Mackay; United States | 4:09.48 | Dani Jones; United States | 4:10.49 | Lucia Stafford; Canada | 4:11.11 |
| 5000 metres | Anisleidis Ochoa; Cuba | 15:35.80 | Bailey Hertenstein; United States | 15:36.34 | Regan Yee; Canada | 15:39.56 |
| 10,000 metres | Taylor Roe; United States | 32:19.84 CR | Anisleidis Ochoa; Cuba | 33:37.20 | Beverly Ramos; Puerto Rico | 36:08.11 |
| 100 metres hurdles (wind: -1.1 m/s) | Amoi Brown; Jamaica | 12.83 | Tatiana Aholou; Canada | 13.01 | Aasia Laurencin; Saint Lucia | 13.04 |
| 400 metres hurdles | Tia-Adana Belle; Barbados | 54.67 | Sanique Walker; Jamaica | 54.94 | Yara Amador Aldaba; Mexico | 55.55 |
| 3000 metres steeplechase | Krissy Gear; United States | 9:35.27 | Grace Fetherstonhaugh; Canada | 9:43.91 | Alondra Negron; Puerto Rico | 10:31.96 |
| 20,000 metres walk | Rachell De Orbeta; Puerto Rico | 1:36:15.88 CR | Mirna Ortiz; Guatemala | 1:37:52.58 | Katie Burnett; United States | 1:45:16.36 |
| High jump | Sanaa Barnes; United States | 1.91 m | Vashti Cunningham; United States | 1.91 m | Dacsy Brisón Beaumont; Cuba | 1.88 m |
| Long jump | Alyssa Jones; United States | 6.74 m | Alysbeth Félix; Puerto Rico | 6.64 m | Tyra Gittens-Spotsville; Trinidad and Tobago | 6.64 m |
| Triple jump | Shanieka Ricketts; Jamaica | 14.23 m | Euphenie Andre; United States | 13.26 m | Agur Dwol; United States | 13.20 m |
| Shot put | Sarah Mitton; Canada | 20.02 m | Jessica Ramsey; United States | 18.27 m | Jessica Woodard; United States | 18.05 m |
| Discus throw | Samantha Hall; Jamaica | 61.19 m | Gabi Jacobs; United States | 57.07 m | Julia Tunks; Canada | 56.78 m |
| Hammer throw | Janee' Kassanavoid; United States | 74.31 m | Nayoka Clunis; Jamaica | 69.30 m | Jillian Weir; Canada | 69.08 m |
| Javelin throw | Evelyn Bliss; United States | 58.62 m | Madison Wiltrout; United States | 58.33 m | Rhema Otabor; Bahamas | 53.70 m |

=== Mixed ===
| Event | Gold | | Silver | | Bronze | |
|---|---|---|---|---|---|---|
| 4 x 400 metres relay | Bovel McPherson; Leah Anderson; Zandrian Barnes; Stacey-Ann Williams; Jamaica | 3:11.10 CR, NR | Gregory Seymour; Katrina Seymour-Stamps; Andrew Styles; Javonya Valcourt; Bahamas | 3:18.93 | Desean Boyce; Sakena Massiah; Raheem Taitt-Best; Tia-Adana Belle; Barbados | 3:20.80 NR |

== Medal table ==
* Host nation (Bahamas)

| Rank | Nation | Gold | Silver | Bronze | Total |
|---|---|---|---|---|---|
| 1 | United States | 16 | 14 | 7 | 37 |
| 2 | Jamaica | 10 | 7 | 8 | 25 |
| 3 | Canada | 5 | 4 | 4 | 13 |
| 4 | Bahamas* | 2 | 3 | 5 | 10 |
| 5 | Cuba | 1 | 2 | 2 | 5 |
| 6 | Guatemala | 1 | 2 | 0 | 3 |
| 7 | Puerto Rico | 1 | 1 | 7 | 9 |
| 8 | Saint Vincent and the Grenadines | 1 | 1 | 0 | 2 |
| 9 | Barbados | 1 | 0 | 1 | 2 |
| 9 | Grenada | 1 | 0 | 1 | 2 |
| 11 | Mexico | 0 | 3 | 1 | 4 |
| 12 | Dominican Republic | 0 | 1 | 0 | 1 |
| 12 | Haiti | 0 | 1 | 0 | 1 |
| 14 | British Virgin Islands | 0 | 0 | 1 | 1 |
| 14 | Saint Lucia | 0 | 0 | 1 | 1 |
| 14 | Trinidad and Tobago | 0 | 0 | 1 | 1 |
| Totals (16 entries) | | 39 | 39 | 39 | 117 |

== Participating nations ==
According to an unofficial count, 316 athletes from 28 countries participated.

- Anguilla (1)
- Antigua and Barbuda (5)
- Aruba (1)
- Bahamas (33)
- Barbados (12)
- Bermuda (5)
- British Virgin Islands (7
- Canada (28)
- Cayman Islands (2)
- Costa Rica (3)
- Cuba (7)
- Dominica (2)
- Dominican Republic (12)
- Grenada (10)
- Guatemala (10)
- Haiti (4)
- Honduras (3)
- Jamaica (39)
- Mexico (21)
- Montserrat (3)
- Puerto Rico (23)
- Saint Lucia (5)
- Saint Vincent and the Grenadines (6)
- El Salvador (5)
- Trinidad and Tobago (13)
- Turks and Caicos Islands (5)
- United States (48)
- United States Virgin Islands (3)

== Schedule ==
15 August
| EST Time | Track Events |
|---|---|
| 09:00 a.m. | Men's 100m Preliminaries |
| 09:30 a.m. | Men's 100m (Decathlon) |
| 09:55 a.m. | Women's 400m Hurdles Semi-finals |
| 10:10 a.m. | Men's 400m Hurdles Semi-finals |
| 10:35 a.m. | Women's 100m Hurdles Semi-finals |
| 10:50 a.m. | Men's 110m Hurdles Semi-finals |
| 11:10 a.m. | Women's 400m Semi-finals |
| 11:30 a.m. | Men's 400m Semi-finals |
| 11:50 a.m. | Women's 100m Semi-finals |
| 12:00 p.m. | Men's 100m Semi-finals |
| 06:15 p.m. | Men's 800m Semi-finals |
| 06:30 p.m. | Women's 100m Hurdles Final |
| 06:45 p.m. | Men's 110m Hurdles Final |
| 07:00 p.m. | Men's 400m (Decathlon) |
| 07:25 p.m. | Men's 5000m Final |
| 07:45 p.m. | Women's 10000m Final |
| 08:30 p.m. | Women's 100m Final |
| 08:40 p.m. | Men's 100m Final |
| EST Time | Field Events |
| 09:05 a.m. | Men's Discus Final |
| 10:05 a.m. | Men's Long jump (Decathlon) |
| 11:00 a.m. | Men's Shot put (Decathlon) |
| 05:25 p.m. | Men's High jump (Decathlon) |
| 05:30 p.m. | Women's Long jump Final |
| 05:35 p.m. | Men's Hammer throw Final |
| 05:50 p.m. | Men's Shot put Final |
16 August
| EST Time | Track Events |
| 06:30 a.m. | Men's/Women's 20km Race-Walk Final |
| 09:00 a.m. | Men's 200m Preliminaries |
| 09:15 a.m. | Men's 110m Hurdles (Decathlon) |
| 11:15 a.m. | Women's 200m Semi-finals |
| 11:30 a.m. | Men's 200m Semi-finals |
| 04:15 p.m. | Men's 4 x 100m relay Semi-finals |
| 06:00 p.m. | Women's 400m Hurdles Final |
| 06:10 p.m. | Men's 400m Hurdles Final |
| 06:28 p.m. | Women's 800m Final |
| 06:35 p.m. | Men's 800m Final |
| 06:58 p.m. | Women's 200m Final |
| 07:05 p.m. | Men's 200m Final |
| 07:35 p.m. | Men's 1500m (Decathlon) |
| 07:50 p.m. | Women's 1500m Final |
| 08:05 p.m. | Men's 1500m Final |
| 08:25 p.m. | Mixed 4 x 400m relay Final |
| 08:45 p.m. | Mixed 4 x 100m relay Final |
| EST Time | Field Events |
| 09:15 a.m. | Men's Long jump Final |
| 09:50 a.m. | Men's Discus (Decathlon) |
| 10:55 a.m. | Men's Pole Vault (Decathlon) |
| 11:00 a.m. | Women's Discus Final |
| 04:30 p.m. | Women's Hammer throw Final |
| 05:40 p.m. | Women's High jump Final |
| 05:55 p.m. | Men's Triple jump Final |
| 06:00 p.m. | Men's Javelin (Decathlon) |
| 07:30 p.m. | Women's Javelin Final |
17 August
| EST Time | Track Events |
| 05:40 p.m. | Women's 400m Final |
| 05:50 p.m. | Men's 400m Final |
| 06:00 p.m. | Women's 3000m Steeplechase Final |
| 06:15 p.m. | Men's 3000m Steeplechase Final |
| 06:50 p.m. | Women's 5000m Final |
| 07:30 p.m. | Women's 4 x 400m relay Final |
| 07:40 p.m. | Men's 4 x 400m relay Final |
| 08:00 p.m. | Women's 4 x 100m relay Final |
| 08:15 p.m. | Men's 4 x 100m relay Final |
| EST Time | Field Events |
| 04:30 p.m. | Men's Javelin Final |
| 05:10 p.m. | Men's High jump Final |
| 05:15 p.m. | Women's Shot put Final |
| 06:15 p.m. | Women's Triple jump Final |

== See also ==
- 2025 World Athletics Championships
