= Delano Kennedy =

Jamaican athlete (born 2004)

Personal information
- Nationality: Jamaican
- Born: 3 February 2004 (age 22)

Sport
- Sport: Athletics
- Event: 400m
- Club: Racers; Uptimum
- Coached by: Glen Mills; Shanikie Osbourne

Achievements and titles
- Personal bests: 400m: 44.74 (Tokyo, 2025)
Medal record
Men's athletics
Representing Jamaica
World Indoor Championships
Bronze medal – third place	2026 Toruń	4 × 400 m relay
Commonwealth Games
Gold medal – first place	2026 Glasgow	4×400m Mixed
World U20 Championships
Silver medal – second place	2022 Cali	4x400 m relay
NACAC Championships
Gold medal – first place	2025 Freeport	4 × 400 m relay
NACAC U23 Championships
Gold medal – first place	2023 San Jose	4x400m relay
CARIFTA Games Junior (U20)
Gold medal – first place	2023 Nassau	4 × 400 m relay
Gold medal – first place	2022 Kingston	400m
Gold medal – first place	2022 Kingston	4x400m relay
Silver medal – second place	2023 Nassau	400 m

Delano Kennedy (born 3 February 2004) is a Jamaican sprinter.

== Early life ==
He was educated in Clarendon Parish, Jamaica at the Edwin Allen High School where he was coached by Leon Powell.

== Career ==
=== 2022 ===
He won a silver medal for Jamaica in the men's 4 x 400 metres relay at the 2022 World Athletics U20 Championships in Cali, Colombia. He was the fastest qualifier with a personal best 45.49 seconds in the individual 400 metres race at the championships, but was disqualified from the final after a false start.

=== 2023 ===
In March 2023, he ran a 45.27 personal best in the 400m finals at Jamaica's High School Championships, held at the National Stadium in Kingston, Jamaica. Competing at the 2023 NACAC U23 Championships in Costa Rica, he won a gold medal in the men's 4 x 400 metres relay.

=== 2025 ===
He competed at the 2025 World Athletics Relays in China in the Mixed 4 × 400 metres relay in May 2025. On 7 June 2025, he ran a 400 metres personal best of 45.22 seconds at the Racers Grand Prix, a World Athletics Continental Tour Silver meeting, in Kingston, Jamaica. He reached the final of the 400 metres at the Jamaican Athletics Championships in June 2025 with a personal best of 44.97 seconds, before going faster in the final to finish second in 44.91 seconds. On 12 July 2025, he ran 45.00 seconds for the 400 metres at the Ed Murphey Track Classic, a World Athletics Continental Tour Silver event, in Memphis, Tennessee.

He was named in the Jamaican squad for the 2025 NACAC Championships in Nassau, The Bahamas. He was selected for the Jamaican team for the 2025 World Athletics Championships in Tokyo, Japan, running a personal best 44.74 seconds to qualify for the 400m semi-finals. He also ran at the championships in the men's 4 x 400 metres relay, helping the Jamaican team qualify for the final and place seventh overall.

=== 2026 ===
Kennedy was selected to represent Jamaica at the 2026 World Athletics Indoor Championships in Toruń, Poland, running an indoors personal best time of 47.02 in the individual 400 metres. Kennedy ran as the Jamaican team initially finished third in the inaugural mixed 4 × 400 m relay at a World Athletics Indoor Championships, running alongside Leah Anderson, Kimar Farquharson and Shana Kaye Anderson, but the team were later disqualified from an incident-filled race which saw Dutch and American runners to fall, and Sara Reifenrath of the United States run her leg of the race with only one shoe, and Jamaica disqualified for exchanging positions before a takeover. On the final day of the championships, he ran in the men's 4 x 400 metres with the team winning the bronze medal. In July 2026, he was a semi-finalist in the 400 metres at the 2026 Commonwealth Games in Glasgow, Scotland. At the Games, he was also part of the gold medal-winning mixed 4 × 400 m relay.
