= Grace Fetherstonhaugh =

Canadian steeplechaser (born 2000)

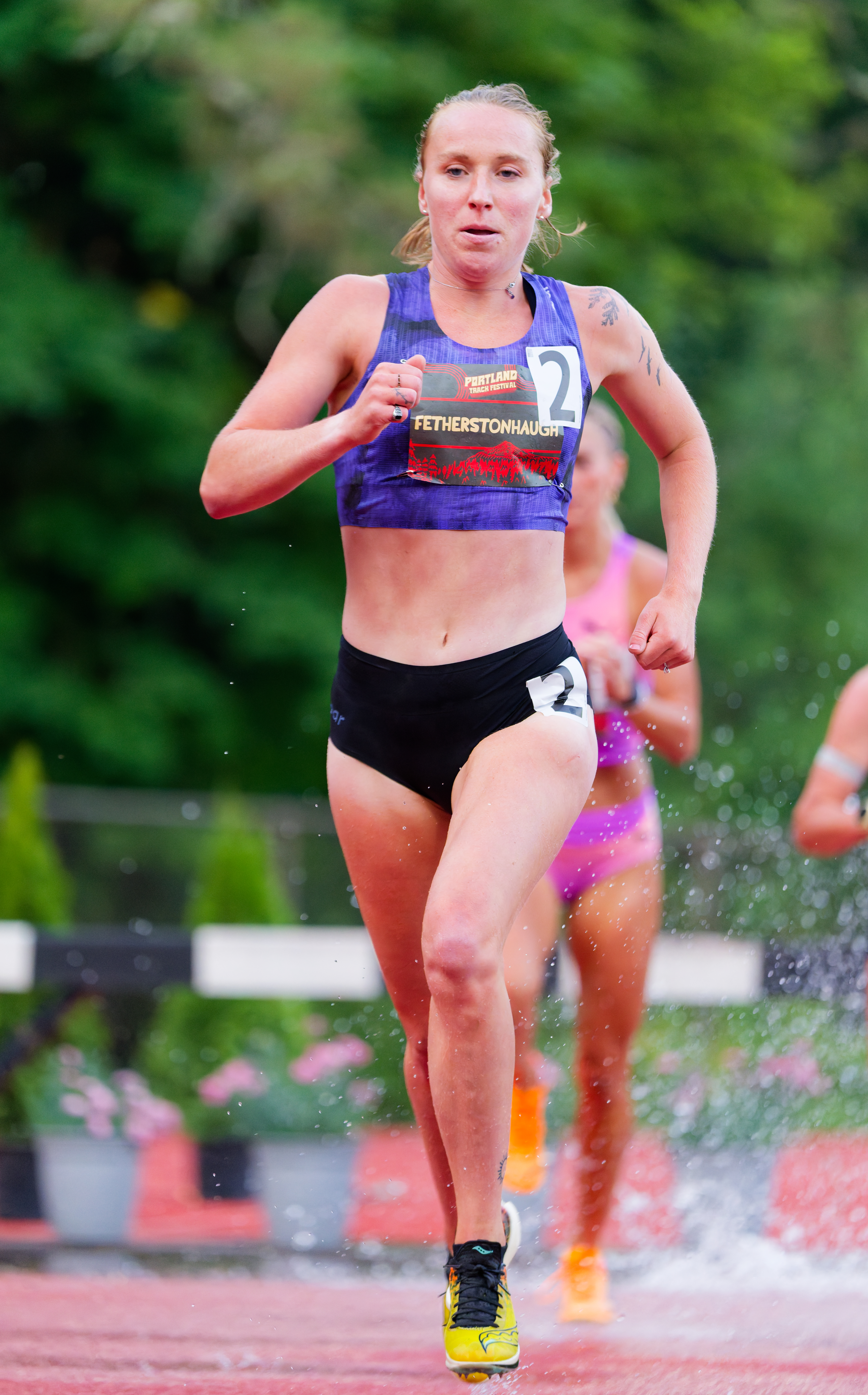

Personal information
- Born: 13 October 2000 (age 25)
- Education: Oregon State University

Sport
- Sport: Athletics
- Event: 3000 metres steeplechase
- University team: Oregon State Beavers

Achievements and titles
- Personal bests: 1500m: 4:06.76 (Portland, 2025); 3000 metres steeplechase: 9:28.42 (Los Angeles 2025); Indoors; 3000m: 8:47.47 (Boston, 2025); 5000m: 15:18.56 (Boston, 2025)
Medal record
Women's athletics
Representing Canada
NACAC Championships
Silver medal – second place	2025 Freeport	3000m steeplechase
Pan American U20 Championships
Silver medal – second place	2019 San José	3000m Steeplechase

Grace Fetherstonhaugh (born 13 October 2000) is a Canadian steeplechaser and middle-distance runner. She won the 3000 metres steeplechase at the Canadian Athletics Championships in 2025 and represented Canada at the 2022 World Athletics Championships.

== Early life ==
She attended New Westminster Secondary School in New Westminster, British Columbia, and competed locally the Royal City Track and Field Club. She signed a letter of intent to run for the Oregon State University in 2018.

== Career ==
In June 2022, she ran a personal best in the 3000 metres steeplechase in Eugene, Oregon of 9:37.56. Later that year, Fetherstonhaugh competed in the 2022 World Athletics Championships for Canada in Eugene after qualifying through ranking. She later placed fourth in the 3000m steeplechase at the 2022 NACAC Championships in Freeport, The Bahamas in August 2022.

Competing for Oregon State University, she completed a double at the 2023 PAC-12 Champiobships, winning in both the 3000 metres steeplechase and the 5000 metres race. She was a finalist in the women’s 3000 metres steeplechase at the 2023 NCAA Outdoor Track & Field Championships in Austin, Texas, placing sixth overall in 9:49.48. She was named the Pac-12 women’s track athlete of the year at the end of that season, the first member of the Oregon State Beavers to win that award.

She finished in third place in the 3000 metres steeplechase at the Canadian Athletics Championships in Montreal in June 2024, in 9:43.13. She placed second in the 3000m steeplechase in 9:43.68 at the Sound Running Sunset Tour in Los Angeles. The following month, she won in England at the British Milers Grand Prix in Bury St Edmunds, in the 3000m steeplechase.

At the Portland Track Festival in June 2025, she set back-to-back personal bests in the 3000 metres steeplechase (9:31.08) and the 1500 metres (4:06.76). The following month, she set another 3000m steeplechase personal best in Los Angeles, with 9:28.42. She won the 2025 Canadian Athletics Championships in the 3000 metres steeplechase in 9:41.05 on 31 July 2025 in Ottawa.

She was named in the Canadian team for the 2025 World Athletics Championships in Tokyo, Japan, where she competed in the 3000 metres steeplechase without advancing to the final. On 10 January 2026, she placed 42nd overall at the 2026 World Athletics Cross Country Championships in Tallahassee.

In June 2026, she ran 9:35.36 to win the 3000 metres steeplechase at the Canadian Championships. She placed sixth in the 3000 m steeplechase at the 2026 Commonwealth Games in Glasgow.
