= Gabi Jacobs =

American discus thrower (born 1996)

Personal information
- Born: 2 November 2000 (age 25)

Sport
- Sport: Athletics
- Event: Discus throw

Achievements and titles
- Personal best: Discus: 68.21m (2025)
Medal record
Women's athletics
Representing United States
NACAC Championships
Silver medal – second place	2025 Freeport	Discus throw

Gabi Jacobs (born 20 August 1996) is an American discus thrower. She finished third at the 2025 USA Outdoor Track and Field Championships.

== Career ==
Competing for the University of Missouri, she was a three-time All-American and school record holder in the discus throw. She threw 58.23 meters in Austin, Texas in 2017. She increased her personal best to 60.16 metres placing fifth in Des Moines at the USA Championships in 2018. She was nominated for the 2019 NCAA Woman of the Year award.

She threw 68.21m in Kansas in 2025 to move to sixth on the American all-time list. Following that, she competed at the USATF Throws Festival where she threw 63.78m and also threw 65.66m at the Iron Wood Classic.

She placed third in the discus at the 2025 USA Outdoor Track and Field Championships in Eugene, Oregon on 3 August 2025 with a throw of 63.33 metres. She was named in the United States squad for the 2025 NACAC Championships, winning the silver medal with a throw of 57.07 metres. In September 2025, she competed at the 2025 World Athletics Championships in Tokyo, Japan, without reaching the final.
