= Miriam Sánchez (sprinter) =

Mexican athlete

Miriam Sanchez
Personal information
- Nationality: Mexican
- Born: Miriam Sánchez Tapia; 28 August 2004 (age 21) Puebla, Mexico

Sport
- Sport: Athletics
- Event: Sprint
Medal record
Women's athletics
Representing Mexico
NACAC Championships
Silver medal – second place	2025 Freeport	200 m

Miriam Sánchez Tapia (born 28 August 2004) is a Mexican sprinter specializing in the 100 metres and 200 metres.

== Career ==
Sanchez is from Puebla, and a student at the Universidad de las Américas Puebla. In 2024, she set a Mexican under-20 (U20) record in the 100 metres with a time of 11.72 seconds.

In 2025, she set Mexican under-23 (U23) records in the 100 metres and 200 metres.

She was a semi-finalist competing for Mexico in the 200 metres at the 2025 World Athletics Championships in Tokyo, Japan. In 2026, she represented Mexico at the Central American and Caribbean Games in Santo Domingo, competing in the 100 metres and 200 metres, but did not advance to the finals in either event.
