= Rasheeme Griffith =

Barbadian athlete (born 2000)

Personal information
- Nationality: Barbados
- Born: 3 May 2000 (age 26)

Sport
- Sport: Athletics
- Event: Sprint

Achievements and titles
- Personal bests: 400m: 47.09 (2024); 400m hurdles: 48.79 (2024) NR
Medal record
Men's athletics
Representing Barbados
NACAC U23 Championships
Gold medal – first place	2021 San José	400 m hurdles
Carifta Games Junior (U20)
Gold medal – first place	2019 George Town	400m hurdles

Rasheeme Griffith (born 3 May 2000) is a Barbadian sprinter and hurdler. He is the Barbadian national record holder over 400 metres hurdles.

== Biography ==
He was a gold medalist in the 400 metres hurdles at the 2019 CARIFTA Games. He was a gold medalist in the 400 metres hurdles at the 2021 NACAC U18 U20 and U23 Championships in Athletics in Costa Rica. He competed for Barbados at the 2022 Commonwealth Games in Birmingham, England.

He ran as part of the Barbadian 4 × 400 m relay team at the 2024 World Relays Championships in Nassau, Bahamas. Whilst competing for the University of Tennessee, established a new 400m hurdles Barbadian national record of 48.79 in the heats of the SEC Championships on 9 May 2024. Also a two-time national champion, he was selected for the 2025 World Athletics Indoor Championships in Nanjing in March 2025. He won the 400 metres hurdles at the Ed Murphey Track Classic, a World Athletics Continental Tour Silver meet, on 12 July in Memphis, Tennessee.

In July 2026, he competed in the 400 metres hurdles at the 2026 Commonwealth Games in Glasgow, Scotland.
