= Will Williams (long jumper) =

American long jumper (born 1995)

Personal information
- Full name: William Williams
- Nationality: USA
- Born: January 31, 1995 (age 31)
- Home town: Chicago Heights, Illinois, U.S.
- Education: Bloom High School; Iowa Western Community College; Texas A&M University
- Agent: Lamont Dagen
- Height: 183 cm (6 ft 0 in)
- Weight: 79 kg (174 lb)

Sport
- Sport: Athletics
- Events: Long jump 100 metres
- College team: Iowa Western Reivers; Texas A&M Aggies
- Club: Winner's Circle
- Coached by: Dwight Phillips
- Now coaching: Arkansas State Red Wolves

Achievements and titles
- National finals: 2014 USA U20s; • Long jump, 3rd (bronze); 2015 USA Champs; • Long jump, 12th; 2016 NCAA Indoors; • Long jump, 7th; 2016 NCAAs; • Long jump, 22nd; 2017 NCAA Indoors; • Long jump, 2nd (silver); 2017 NCAAs; • Long jump, 3rd (bronze); • 4 × 100 m, 4th; 2017 USA Champs; • Long jump, 8th; 2018 NCAA Indoors; • Long jump, 1st (gold); 2019 USA Indoors; • Long jump, 4th; 2019 USA Champs; • Long jump, 17th; 2022 USA Indoors; • Long jump, 4th; 2022 USA Champs; • Long jump, 4th; 2023 USA Indoors; • Long jump, 1st (gold); 2023 USA Champs; • Long jump, 8th
- Personal bests: 100 m: 10.32 (+0.9 m/s) (2022); LJ: 8.23 m (+1.0 m/s) (2023)
Medal record
Men's athletics
Representing United States
NACAC Championships
Gold medal – first place	2022 Freeport	Long jump
Silver medal – second place	2025 Freeport	Long jump
- Updated on January 15, 2024

William Williams (born January 31, 1995) is an American long jumper. After a successful collegiate career at Texas A&M winning the 2018 NCAA Division I Indoor Track and Field Championships, he went on to win the 2022 NACAC Championships and qualify for two World Athletics Championships competitions, with a best finish of 8th at the 2023 world championships.

== Early career ==
Williams is from Chicago Heights, Illinois where he attended Bloom High School. At Bloom, Williams was runner-up at the 2013 Illinois High School Association 3A state long jump championships.

In 2014, he joined the Iowa Western Reivers track and field team, finishing second at that year's indoor and outdoor NJCAA championships. He then transferred to the Texas A&M Aggies track and field program, which he represented from 2016 to 2018. He qualified for the 2016 United States Olympic trials, but he did not post a valid mark in the preliminary rounds.

== Texas A&M ==
At Texas A&M, Williams qualified for five NCAA Division I finals in track and field, with his first podium finish coming at the 2017 NCAA Division I Indoor Track and Field Championships where he finished 2nd. Williams was not expected to score, but his runner-up finish helped Texas A&M score enough points to win the team title.

Williams won his first NCAA national title at the 2018 NCAA Division I Indoor Track and Field Championships. He took an early lead after the first round of jumping, but he was quickly surpassed by Charles Brown and eventually Grant Holloway, who jumped 8.13 metres to lead in the penultimate round but then decided to skip the final round to focus on his 60 metres hurdles event. Williams saved his best effort for his final jump, posting an 8.19 metres personal best to win the championship. He had only jumped further than 7.90 metres one time before indoors, but at the 2018 championships he surpassed that mark three times.

== Professional career ==
At the 2021 United States Olympic trials, Williams jumped a best of 7.73 metres and did not advance to the finals, missing out on the 2021 U.S. Olympic team. By virtue of placing 4th at the 2022 USA Outdoor Track and Field Championships, Williams was able to represent the United States for the first time at both the 2022 NACAC Championships and the 2022 World Athletics Championships that summer. Though Williams did not advance to the finals of the 2022 World Championships, he redeemed himself by winning the gold medal at the NACAC Championships the following month.

He achieved his first national title at the 2023 USA Indoor Track and Field Championships, jumping a new personal best of 8.20 metres. Though he only finished 8th at the 2023 US Outdoor Championships, he nonetheless qualified for the 2023 World Athletics Championships because many of the jumpers ahead of him had not achieved the World Championship standard that Williams had. At his second world championships, Williams advanced from the first round with an 8.13 m mark, but could only manage 7.94 metres in the finals for 8th place.

== Personal life ==
Williams is a member of the Winner's Circle club and he is coached by four-time world champion long jumper Dwight Phillips.

In addition to his professional long jump career, Williams considers himself a professional slam dunker as well. He won the 2023 Relays Night slam dunk contest held during the half-time of a January Drake Bulldogs men's basketball game in honor of the Drake Relays, scoring 114 out of 120 possible points.

In 2020, Williams was named as an assistant coach for the Arkansas State Red Wolves track and field team.

== Statistics ==
=== Best performances ===
Event	Mark	Pl.	Competition	Venue	Date	Ref
Long jump	8.23 m (+1.0 m/s)	1st place, gold medalist(s)	Mt. SAC Relays	Walnut, California	April 15, 2023	
100 metres	10.32 (+0.9 m/s)	(gold) (Race C)	Alumni Muster	College Station, Texas	April 30, 2022	
