= Dani Jones =

American middle-distance runner (born 1996)

Personal information
- Full name: Danielle Jones
- Nationality: United States
- Born: August 21, 1996 (age 29) Fort Wayne, Indiana, U.S.
- Height: 5 ft 6 in (168 cm)

Sport
- Sport: Track and field
- Event(s): 1500 m, 3000 m, 5000 m
- College team: Colorado
- Turned pro: 2020

Achievements and titles
- National finals: 2018 USA Champs; • 1500m, 5th; 2022 USA Indoors; • 1500m, 5th; 2022 USA Indoors; • 3000m, 4th; 2022 USA Champs; • 1500m, 8th; 2023 USA Champs; • 1500m, DNF
- Personal bests: 800 m: 2:00.10 (Sacramento 2021); 1500 m: 4:00.64 (Stockholm, Sweden 2024); Mile: 4:23.80i (New York City 2024); 3000 m: 8:41.01 (Rovereto, Italy 2021); 5000 m: 15:17.11i (Boston 2020)
Medal record
Women's athletics
Representing United States
NACAC Championships
Silver medal – second place	2025 Freeport	1500 m

Danielle "Dani" Jones (born August 21, 1996) is an American middle-distance runner. She is a four-time NCAA Division I champion winning two gold medals at the 2017 NCAA Division I Indoor Track and Field Championships in the 3000-meters and Indoor Distance Medley Relay, a gold in 2018 in Cross-Country, and later won the 2019 NCAA Outdoor Championships in the 5000-meters. In May 2018, she finished first at the National Women's 1500-meters at the Prefontaine Classic in a time of 4:07.74.

== High school career ==
Born in Fort Wayne, Indiana and raised in Phoenix, Arizona, Jones attended and ran for Desert Vista High School. In spring 2012, she won her first Arizona state title in the 1600-meters. The following year, she won the Arizona state cross country title. She eventually set Arizona high school state outdoor track records for the mile, 1600 m, and 3200 m.

== College career ==
Jones attended the University of Colorado from 2015 to 2020 where she was a four-time NCAA Divion I champion capturing titles in the outdoor 5000-meters, indoor 3000-meters, cross-country, and the distance medley relay. She earned All-America honors 12-times.

As a collegiate athlete for the Colorado Buffaloes, she won the 3000 m and the distance medley relay at the 2017 NCAA Division I Outdoor Track and Field Championships. During a redshirt season in spring 2018, she won the National Women's 1500 m at the Prefontaine Classic. That fall, she led her team to an NCAA title at the 2018 NCAA Division I Cross Country Championships by way of her first-place finish in the race. This was the second time in two decades that the Buffaloes had both a first-place finisher and finished in first place as a team at the national championships. She won the Honda Sports Award as the nation's best female collegiate cross-country competitor in 2019.

== Professional career ==
In December 2020, Jones announces that she would be pursuing a professional running career. She signed with Hawi Management, choosing Merhawi Keflezighi as her agent. Soon thereafter she secured a professional contract with New Balance and then joined the Bosshard training group in Boulder. Colorado.

== Major international competitions ==
Year	Competition	Venue	Position	Event	Notes
2014	Adidas Grand Prix	New York, New York	3rd	Mile run	4:43.40
2015	Prefontaine Classic	Eugene, Oregon	2nd	Mile run	4:39.88
2015	Adidas Grand Prix	New York, New York	6th	Mile run	4:41.35
2025	2025 NACAC Championships	Freeport, Bahamas	2nd	1500 metres	4:10.49

== Domestic competitions ==
Year	Competition	Venue	Position	Event	Notes
representing Desert Vista High School
2015	Mt. SAC Relays	Walnut, California	1st	800m	2:08.85
representing Colorado Buffaloes
2015	NCAA Women's Division I Cross Country Championship	Louisville, Kentucky	49th	Cross country running	20:32
2016	Payton Jordan Invitational	Stanford, California	5th (Race D)	800m	2:05.27
2016	NCAA Women's Division I Outdoor Track and Field Championships	Eugene, Oregon	9th	1500m	4:15.86
2016	NCAA Division I Cross Country Championships	Terre Haute, Indiana	22nd	6000m	20:14.2
2017	NCAA Women's Division I Indoor Track and Field Championships	College Station, Texas	1st	3000m	9:09.20
2017	NCAA Women's Division I Outdoor Track and Field Championships	Eugene, Oregon	5th	1500m	4:14.35
2017	NCAA Women's Division I Cross Country Championship	Louisville, Kentucky	10th	Cross country running	19:47
2018	NCAA Women's Division I Indoor Track and Field Championships	College Station, Texas	2nd	Mile run	4:31.82
2018	Prefontaine Classic	Eugene, Oregon	1st	1500 m	4:07.74 (National heat)
2018	NCAA Women's Division I Cross Country Championship	Madison, Wisconsin	1st	Cross country running	19:42.8
2018	USA Outdoor Track and Field Championships	Des Moines, Iowa	5th	1500 m	4:09.16
2019	NCAA Women's Division I Outdoor Track and Field Championships	Austin, Texas	1st	5000m	15:50.65
2019	USA Outdoor Track and Field Championships	Des Moines, Iowa	13th	1500 m	4:12.00
representing New Balance
2021	US Olympic Trials	Eugene, Oregon	9th	1500 m	4:06.46
2022	USA Indoor Track and Field Championships	Spokane, Washington	5th	1500 m	4:08.14
2022	USA Indoor Track and Field Championships	Spokane, Washington	4th	3000m	8:49.44
2022	USA Outdoor Track and Field Championships	Eugene, Oregon	8th	1500 m	4:09.86
2023	USA Outdoor Track and Field Championships	Eugene, Oregon	N/A	1500 m	DNF
2025	USA Outdoor Track and Field Championships	Eugene, Oregon	5th	1500 m	4:05.62
