= Terrence Jones (athlete) =

Bahamian sprinter (born 2002)

Personal information
- Born: November 8, 2002 (age 23)

Sport
- College team: Texas Tech
Medal record
Athletics
Representing Bahamas
NACAC Championships
Bronze medal – third place	2025 Freeport	4 × 100 m relay
NCAA Outdoor
Bronze medal – third place	2023 Austin	200 meters
NCAA Indoors
Gold medal – first place	2024 Boston	60 meters
Gold medal – first place	2024 Boston	200 meters
Gold medal – first place	2023 Albuquerque	60 meters
NACAC U-23 Championships
Gold medal – first place	2021 San Jose	100 meters
Gold medal – first place	2021 San Jose	4 × 100 meters relay
Silver medal – second place	2021 San Jose	200 meters
CARIFTA Games Junior (U20)
Gold medal – first place	2019 George Town	400 meters
Bronze medal – third place	2019 George Town	200 meters
Bronze medal – third place	2019 George Town	4 × 400 meters relay
CARIFTA Games Junior (U18)
Bronze medal – third place	2018 Nassau	200 meters

Terrence Jones (born 8 November 2002) is a Bahamian sprinter from West End, Grand Bahama. Jones attended Tabernacle Baptist Christian Academy in Freeport, Grand Bahama before going on to compete for Texas Tech University. He holds the Bahamian 200 m Jr National Record with a time of 20.36 (+0.9 m/s) as well as the National Record and NCAA Indoor 60 m record with a time of 6.45. On the April 15 2023 he equalled Derrick Atkins' Bahamian national 100 m record with a time of 9.91 (1.0 m/s) This makes him the first Bahamian born in the Bahamas to achieve a sub 10 clocking, as Atkins was born in Jamaica.

Grand Slam Track results
Slam	Race group	Event	Pl.	Time	Prize money
2025 Kingston Slam	Short sprints	100 m	6th	10.26	US$10,000
2025 Kingston Slam	Short sprints	200 m	8th	20.79	US$10,000
