= Sanaa Barnes =

American high jumper (born 2000)

Personal information
- Born: 10 August 2000 (age 25)

Sport
- Sport: Athletics
- Event: High jump

Achievements and titles
- Personal bests: High jump: 1.94 m (Eugene, 2025)
Medal record
Women's athletics
Representing United States
NACAC Championships
| Gold medal – first place | 2025 Freeport | High jump |
Pan American U20 Championships
| Gold medal – first place | 2019 San José | High jump |

Sanaa Barnes (born 10 August 2000) is an American high jumper. The Pan American U20 champion in 2019, she finished as runner-up at the 2025 USA Outdoor Track and Field Championships and won the gold medal at the 2025 NACAC Championships prior to competing for the United States at the 2025 World Athletics Championships.

== Biography ==
From Texas, she attended Byron Nelson High School in Denton County and won the Texan University Interscholastic League state 6A championships in 2017 in the high jump. That year she went on to compete for the United States at the 2017 Pan American U20 Athletics Championships in Peru.

Barnes finished second at the USATF Junior Outdoor Championships in 2018, and later went on to finish eighth at the 2018 IAAF World U20 Championships in Tampere, Estonia. She won the gold medal in the women's high jump at the 2019 Pan American U20 Athletics Championships in San José, Costa Rica.

Competing for Villanova University, she placed fourth at the 2022 NCAA Outdoor Championships before later transferring to Auburn University ahead of the 2023 season. She placed joint-fourth with a jump of 1.82 m (5 ft 11 1/2 in) at the 2022 USA Outdoor Track and Field Championships. The following year at the 2023 NCAA Championships, she cleared 1.84 m (6 ft 1/4 in) in Austin, Texas which was good enough for fifth place on that occasion.

Barnes jumped a personal best 1.88 m (6 ft 2 in) to finish fifth at the US Olympic Trials in Eugene, Oregon in June 2024. She placed fourth at the USA Indoor Track and Field Championships in New York, in February 2025.

Barnes defeated national champion Vashti Cunningham at the Penn Relays in April 2025, with a clearance of 1.87 m (6 ft 1 1/2 in). She finished second behind Cunningham at the 2025 USA Outdoor Track and Field Championships in Eugene, Oregon on 1 August 2025, with a personal best clearance of 1.94 m (6 ft 4 1/4 in). She won the gold medal competing for the United States at the 2025 NACAC Championships in Freeport, The Bahamas after she and Cunningham both cleared 1.91 m (6 ft 3 in), with Barnes awarded gold after making five first time clearances from the start of the competition.

She competed at the 2025 World Athletics Championships in Tokyo, Japan, in September 2025, clearing 1.83 m (6 ft 0 in) without advancing to the final.

Barnes competed in the high jump at the 2026 USA Indoor Track and Field Championships in New York, placing fourth overall clearing 1.87 m (6 ft 1 1/2 in). On 26 July, she cleared 1.89 metres for a third place finish at the 2026 USA Championships in New York.
