= 2024 NCAA Division I Indoor Track and Field Championships =

College track and field competition

- Dates: March 8–9, 2024
- Host city: Boston, Massachusetts UMass Lowell Boston College
- Venue: The TRACK at New Balance
- Events: 34
- Participation: 650 selected athletes

The 2024 NCAA Division I Indoor Track and Field Championships was the 59th NCAA Division I Men's Indoor Track and Field Championships and the 42nd NCAA Division I Women's Indoor Track and Field Championships, held at The TRACK at New Balance in Boston, Massachusetts. The field consisted of 17 different men's and women's indoor track and field events with a total of 650 participants contested from March 8 to March 9, 2024.

== Streaming and TV coverage ==
ESPN streamed the event on ESPN2, and ESPNU. On March 10, a replay of the championships was broadcast at 9:00 PM Eastern Time on ESPNU.

== Results ==
Final results are shown below, not prelims.

=== Men's results ===
==== Men's 60 meters ====
Placings in the men's 60 meters at the 2024 NCAA Division I Indoor Track and Field Championships
Rank	Name	University	Time	Team score
1st place, gold medalist(s)	(The Bahamas) Terrence Jones	Texas Tech	6.54	10
2nd place, silver medalist(s)	(United States) Kalen Walker	Iowa	6.59	8
3rd place, bronze medalist(s)	(United States) Don'dre Swint	Texas Tech	6.60	6
4	(The Bahamas) Wanya McCoy	Florida	6.60	5
5	(Jamaica) Travis Williams	USC	6.64	4
6	(United States) Caleb Dean	Texas Tech	6.67	3
7	(Ivory Coast) Cheickna Traore	Penn State	6.68	2
8	(Ghana) Saminu Abdul-Rasheed	South Florida	6.69	1

==== Men's 200 meters ====
Placings in the men's 200 meters at the 2024 NCAA Division I Indoor Track and Field Championships
Rank	Name	University	Time	Team score
1st place, gold medalist(s)	(The Bahamas) Terrence Jones	Texas Tech	20.23	10
2nd place, silver medalist(s)	(Ivory Coast) Cheickna Traore	Penn State	20.30	8
3rd place, bronze medalist(s)	(United States) Robert Gregory	Florida	20.37	6
4	(Uganda) Tarsis Orogot	Alabama	20.46	5
5	(United States) Anthony Greenhow	South Carolina	20.84	4
6	(United States) Lance Lang	Arkansas	20.95	3
7	(The Bahamas) Wanya McCoy	Florida	25.60	2
	(United States) Cameron Miller	Purdue	DQ	

==== Men's 400 meters ====
Placings in the men's 400 meters at the 2024 NCAA Division I Indoor Track and Field Championships
Rank	Name	University	Time	Team score
1st place, gold medalist(s)	(Canada) Christopher Morales Williams	Georgia	44.67	10
2nd place, silver medalist(s)	(United States) Auhmad Robinson	Texas A&M	44.91	8
3rd place, bronze medalist(s)	(United States) Judson Lincoln IV	Virginia Tech	45.57	6
4	(Jamaica) JeVaughn Powell	Florida	45.59	5
5	(United States) William Jones	USC	45.78	4
6	(Jamaica) Shaemar Uter	Texas Tech	45.94	3
7	(United States) Brian Herron	Texas	46.01	2
8	(Nigeria) Nathaniel Ezekiel	Baylor	46.32	1

==== Men's 800 meters ====
Placings in the men's 800 meters at the 2024 NCAA Division I Indoor Track and Field Championships
Rank	Name	University	Time	Team score
1st place, gold medalist(s)	(Jamaica) Rivaldo Marshall	Iowa	1:46.92	10
2nd place, silver medalist(s)	(United States) Sean Dolan	Villanova	1:47.61	8
3rd place, bronze medalist(s)	(United Kingdom) Finley McLear	Iowa State	1:47.68	6
4	(United States) Nicholas Plant	Virginia Tech	1:47.75	5
5	(Jamaica) Tarees Rhoden	Clemson	1:47.79	4
6	(United States) Darius Kipyego	Iowa State	1:47.99	3
7	(Saint Vincent and the Grenadines) Handal Roban	Penn State	1:48.16	2
8	(Canada) Abdullahi Hassan	Wisconsin	1:50.78	1

==== Men's mile ====
Placings in the men's mile at the 2024 NCAA Division I Indoor Track and Field Championships
Rank	Name	University	Time	Team score
1st place, gold medalist(s)	(United States) Luke Houser	Washington	4:01.72	10
2nd place, silver medalist(s)	(Australia) Adam Spencer	Wisconsin	4:01.92	8
3rd place, bronze medalist(s)	(United States) Lucas Bons	BYU	4:02.12	6
4	(United States) Ethan Strand	North Carolina	4:02.44	5
5	(United States) Abel Teffra	Georgetown	4:02.57	4
6	(United States) Colin Sahlman	Northern Arizona	4:02.57	3
7	(India) Parvej Khan	Florida	4:03.05	2
8	(United States) Joe Waskom	Washington	4:03.26	1
9	(United States) Nick Foster	Michigan	4:05.32	
10	(United States) Gary Martin	Virginia	4:12.44	

==== Men's 3000 meters ====
Placings in the men's 3000 meter at the 2024 NCAA Division I Indoor Track and Field Championships
Rank	Name	University	Time	Team score
1st place, gold medalist(s)	(United States) Nico Young	Northern Arizona	7:41.01	10
2nd place, silver medalist(s)	(United States) Parker Wolfe	North Carolina	7:42.38	8
3rd place, bronze medalist(s)	(United States) Alex Maier	Oklahoma State	7:44.68	6
4	(United States) Liam Murphy	Villanova	7:45.64	5
5	(Australia) Ky Robinson	Stanford	7:46.13	4
6	(Kenya) Brian Musau	Oklahoma State	7:46.79	3
7	(Eritrea) Habtom Samuel	New Mexico	7:46.86	2
8	(United States) Ryan Schoppe	Oklahoma State	7:48.11	1
9	(Spain) Aaron Las Heras	Northern Arizona	7:50.54	
10	(Morocco) Anass Essayi	South Carolina	7:54.67	
11	(United Kingdom) David Mullarkey	Florida State	7:55.42	
12	(Sudan) Yaseen Abdalla	Tennessee	7:55.57	
13	(New Zealand) Theo Quax	Northern Arizona	7:56.35	
14	(United States) Marco Langdon	Villanova	8:00.83	
15	(United States) Luke Houser	Washington	8:08.03	
16	(United States) Matt Strangio	Portland	8:24.07	

==== Men's 5000 meters ====
Placings in the men's 5000 meter at the 2024 NCAA Division I Indoor Track and Field Championships
Rank	Name	University	Time	Team score
1st place, gold medalist(s)	(United States) Nico Young	Northern Arizona	13:25.29	10
2nd place, silver medalist(s)	(United States) Parker Wolfe	North Carolina	13:27.37	8
3rd place, bronze medalist(s)	(Australia) Ky Robinson	Stanford	13:27.79	6
4	(Eritrea) Habtom Samuel	New Mexico	13:30.07	5
5	(Uganda) Peter Maru	Arkansas	13:30.51	4
6	(United States) Alex Maier	Oklahoma State	13:31.17	3
7	(Spain) Aaron Las Heras	Northern Arizona	13:31.55	2
8	(Australia) Jackson Sharp	Wisconsin	13:31.63	1
9	(Kenya) Kirami Yego	Arkansas	13:36.32	
10	(Spain) Said Mechaal	Iowa State	13:36.99	
11	(Kenya) Patrick Kiprop	Arkansas	13:39.18	
12	(United States) Alex Phillip	North Carolina	13:43.00	
13	(Kenya) Denis Kipngetich	Oklahoma State	13:43.26	
14	(New Zealand) Theo Quax	Northern Arizona	13:45.34	
15	(Kenya) Evans Kiplagat	New Mexico	13:46.41	
16	(United States) Tom Brady	Michigan	13:48.32	

==== Men's 60 meter hurdles ====
Placings in the men's 60 meter hurdles at the 2024 NCAA Division I Indoor Track and Field Championships
Rank	Name	University	Time	Team score
1st place, gold medalist(s)	(United States) Caleb Dean	Texas Tech	7.56	10
2nd place, silver medalist(s)	(United States) Johnny Brackins	USC	7.57	8
3rd place, bronze medalist(s)	(United States) Jaqualon Scott	Texas A&M	7.59	6
4	(United States) De' Vion Wilson	Houston	7.65	5
5	(United States) Connor Schulman	Texas A&M	7.66	4
6	(Jamaica) Jaheem Hayles	Syracuse	7.73	3
7	(United States) Darius Brown	DePaul	7.74	2
8	(United States) Ethan Exilhomme	Northeastern	7.82	1

==== Men's 4 × 400 meters relay ====
Placings in the men's 4 × 400 meter at the 2024 NCAA Division I Indoor Track and Field Championships
Rank	University	Time	Team score
1st place, gold medalist(s)	Arizona State	3:02.35	10
2nd place, silver medalist(s)	Florida	3:02.53	8
3rd place, bronze medalist(s)	Texas A&M	3:03.35	6
4	Texas Tech	3:03.37	5
5	Alabama	3:03.94	4
6	Tennessee	3:04.63	3
7	USC	3:04.67	2
8	Arkansas	3:04.77	1
9	LSU	3:05.30	
10	Kansas State	3:05.39	
11	BYU	3:05.56	
	Texas	DQ	

==== Men's distance medley relay ====
Placings in the men's distance medley relay at the 2024 NCAA Division I Indoor Track and Field Championships
Rank	University	Time	Team score
1st place, gold medalist(s)	Oklahoma State	9:25.24	10
2nd place, silver medalist(s)	Georgetown	9:25.77	8
3rd place, bronze medalist(s)	Virginia	9:27.18	6
4	North Carolina	9:27.96	5
5	Arkansas	9:28.88	4
6	Indiana	9:29.37	3
7	Iowa State	9:30.07	2
8	Wisconsin	9:30.16	1
9	Washington	9:30.40	
10	Virginia Tech	9:32.20	
11	Northern Arizona	9:38.25	
12	Michigan	9:38.40	

==== Men's high jump ====
Placings in the men's high jump at the 2024 NCAA Division I Indoor Track and Field Championships
Rank	Name	University	Best Jump	Team score
1st place, gold medalist(s)	(Jamaica) Romaine Beckford	Arkansas	2.27 m (7 ft 5 1/4 in)	10
2nd place, silver medalist(s)	(United States) Caleb Snowden	Arkansas-Pine Bluff	2.24 m (7 ft 4 in)	8
3rd place, bronze medalist(s)	(United States) Devin Loudermilk	Kansas	2.21 m (7 ft 3 in)	6
4	(United States) Tyus Wilson	Nebraska	2.21 m (7 ft 3 in)	5
5	(Nigeria) Omamuyovwi Erhire	Texas Tech	2.18 m (7 ft 1 3/4 in)	3.5
5	(Jamaica) Zayne Palomino	Southern Miss	2.18 m (7 ft 1 3/4 in)	3.5
7	(United States) Riyon Rankin	Georgia	2.18 m (7 ft 1 3/4 in)	2
8	(United States) Andrew Taylor	High Point	2.18 m (7 ft 1 3/4 in)	1
9	(United States) Kennedy Sauder	Miami (Fla)	2.18 m (7 ft 1 3/4 in)	
9	(United States) Tito Alofe	Harvard	2.18 m (7 ft 1 3/4 in)	
11	(United States) Kamyren Garrett	Illinois	2.15 m (7 ft 1/2 in)	
11	(United States) Brion Stephens	Louisville	2.15 m (7 ft 1/2 in)	
13	(Sri Lanka) Ushan Perera	Texas A&M	2.15 m (7 ft 1/2 in)	
14	(United States) Trey Allen	Louisville	2.15 m (7 ft 1/2 in)	
15	(United States) Kaithon McDonald	Texas Tech	2.10 m (6 ft 10 1/2 in)	
16	(Singapore) Kampton Kam	Penn	2.10 m (6 ft 10 1/2 in)	

==== Men's pole vault ====
Placings in the men's pole vault at the 2024 NCAA Division I Indoor Track and Field Championships
Rank	Name	University	Best Jump	Team score
1st place, gold medalist(s)	(United States) Keaton Daniel	Kentucky	5.70 m (18 ft 8 1/4 in)	10
2nd place, silver medalist(s)	(United States) Bradley Jelmert	Arkansas State	5.65 m (18 ft 6 1/4 in)	8
3rd place, bronze medalist(s)	(United States) Conner McClure	Virginia Tech	5.55 m (18 ft 2 1/2 in)	6
4	(United States) James Rhoads	Penn	5.50 m (18 ft 1/2 in)	5
5	(United States) Scott Toney	Penn	5.50 m (18 ft 1/2 in)	4
6	(United States) Clayton Simms	Kansas	5.50 m (18 ft 1/2 in)	3
7	(United States) Alexander Slinkman	Rice	5.40 m (17 ft 8 1/2 in)	2
8	(United States) Marshall Faurot	South Dakota	5.40 m (17 ft 8 1/2 in)	1
9	(United States) William Staggs	Indiana State	5.40 m (17 ft 8 1/2 in)	
10	(United States) Christyan Sampy	Houston	5.30 m (17 ft 4 1/2 in)	
11	(France) Mathis Bresko	Washington	5.30 m (17 ft 4 1/2 in)	
11	(United States) Max Manson	Washington	5.30 m (17 ft 4 1/2 in)	
13	(United States) Ashton Barkdull	Kansas	5.30 m (17 ft 4 1/2 in)	
	(United States) Garrett Brown	Stanford	NH	
	(United States) Hunter Garretson	Akron	NH	
	(United States) Skyler Magula	California	NH	

==== Men's long jump ====
Placings in the men's long jump at the 2024 NCAA Division I Indoor Track and Field Championships
Rank	Name	University	Best Jump	Team score
1st place, gold medalist(s)	(Jamaica) Wayne Pinnock	Arkansas	8.40 m (27 ft 6 1/2 in)	10
2nd place, silver medalist(s)	(United States) Jeremiah Davis	Florida State	8.20 m (26 ft 10 3/4 in)	8
3rd place, bronze medalist(s)	(United States) Malcolm Clemons	Florida	8.11 m (26 ft 7 1/4 in)	6
4	(United States) Johnny Brackins	USC	8.01 m (26 ft 3 1/4 in)	5
5	(United States) Prestin Artis	Washington	8.00 m (26 ft 2 3/4 in)	4
6	(United States) Sincere Robinson	Rutgers	7.90 m (25 ft 11 in)	3
7	(Germany) Till Steinforth	Nebraska	7.87 m (25 ft 9 3/4 in)	2
8	(United States) Caleb Foster	Florida	7.73 m (25 ft 4 1/4 in)	1
9	(United States) Tye Hunt	Youngstown State	7.66 m (25 ft 1 1/2 in)	
10	(United States) Salif Mane	Fairleigh Dickinson	7.56 m (24 ft 9 1/2 in)	
11	(United States) Chrstyn John (Jc) Stevenson	USC	7.45 m (24 ft 5 1/4 in)	
11	(Italy) Kareem Mersal	Wyoming	7.45 m (24 ft 5 1/4 in)	
13	(Jamaica) Jordan Turner	Florida State	7.31 m (23 ft 11 3/4 in)	
14	(United States) Kenson Tate	Lamar	7.11 m (23 ft 3 3/4 in)	
15	(United States) Remar Pitter	Wyoming	6.75 m (22 ft 1 1/2 in)	
	(Jamaica) Nikaoli Williams	Oklahoma	NM	

==== Men's triple jump ====
Placings in the men's triple jump at the 2024 NCAA Division I Indoor Track and Field Championships
Rank	Name	University	Best Jump	Team score
1st place, gold medalist(s)	(United States) Russell Robinson	Miami (Fla)	16.76 m (54 ft 11 3/4 in)	10
2nd place, silver medalist(s)	(Jamaica) Luke Brown	Kentucky	16.73 m (54 ft 10 1/2 in)	8
3rd place, bronze medalist(s)	(United States) Jeremiah Davis	Florida State	16.60 m (54 ft 5 1/2 in)	6
4	(United States) Salif Mane	Fairleigh Dickinson	16.58 m (54 ft 4 3/4 in)	5
5	(United States) Sean Dixon-Bodie	Florida	16.50 m (54 ft 1 1/2 in)	4
6	(United States) Brandon Green JR	Oklahoma	16.41 m (53 ft 10 in)	3
7	(United States) Micaylon Moore	Nebraska	16.11 m (52 ft 10 1/4 in)	2
8	(Trinidad and Tobago) Kelsey Daniel	Texas	16.00 m (52 ft 5 3/4 in)	1
9	(Canada) Praise Aniamaka	Purdue	15.98 m (52 ft 5 in)	
10	(United Kingdom) Daniel Falode	Harvard	15.76 m (51 ft 8 1/4 in)	
11	(United States) Sterling Scott	Missouri	15.50 m (50 ft 10 in)	
12	(United States) Zavien Wolfe	Georgia	15.47 m (50 ft 9 in)	
13	(Jamaica) Terrol Wilson	Nebraska	15.43 m (50 ft 7 1/4 in)	
14	(Zimbabwe) Theophilus Mudzengerere	South Carolina	15.33 m (50 ft 3 1/2 in)	
15	(United States) Mitchell Effing	Northern Arizona	15.20 m (49 ft 10 1/4 in)	
16	(Jamaica) Astley Davis	Southern Utah	15.16 m (49 ft 8 3/4 in)	

==== Men's shot put ====
Placings in the men's shot put at the 2024 NCAA Division I Indoor Track and Field Championships
Rank	Name	University	Best Throw	Team score
1st place, gold medalist(s)	(United States) Tarik Robinson-O'Hagan	Ole Miss	21.05 m (69 ft 1/2 in)	10
2nd place, silver medalist(s)	(Jamaica) Roje Stona	Arkansas	20.48 m (67 ft 2 1/4 in)	8
3rd place, bronze medalist(s)	(United States) Dylan Targgart	South Carolina	19.95 m (65 ft 5 1/4 in)	6
4	(United States) Jason Swarens	Wisconsin	19.87 m (65 ft 2 1/4 in)	5
5	(United States) Thomas Kitchell	Wake Forest	19.73 m (64 ft 8 3/4 in)	4
6	(United States) Michael Shoaf	Notre Dame	19.43 m (63 ft 8 3/4 in)	3
7	(Australia) Alexander Kolesnikoff	Georgia	19.16 m (62 ft 10 1/4 in)	2
8	(United States) John Meyer	LSU	19.05 m (62 ft 6 in)	1
9	(Jamaica) Courtney Lawrence	Clemson	18.94 m (62 ft 1 1/2 in)	
10	(Jamaica) Kai Chang	Florida	18.78 m (61 ft 7 1/4 in)	
11	(United States) Hayden Tobias	Ohio State	18.70 m (61 ft 4 in)	
12	(United States) Cam Jones	Iowa State	18.67 m (61 ft 3 in)	
13	(British Virgin Islands) Djimon Gumbs	Northwestern State	18.60 m (61 ft 1/4 in)	
14	(United States) Kevin Shubert	Nebraska	18.53 m (60 ft 9 1/2 in)	
15	(United States) Andrew Stone	Wisconsin	18.46 m (60 ft 6 3/4 in)	
16	(Jamaica) Warren Barrett	Liberty	17.98 m (58 ft 11 3/4 in)	

==== Men's weight throw ====
Placings in the men's weight throw at the 2024 NCAA Division I Indoor Track and Field Championships
Rank	Name	University	Best Throw	Team score
1st place, gold medalist(s)	(United Kingdom) Kenneth Ikeji	Harvard	24.32 m (79 ft 9 1/4 in)	10
2nd place, silver medalist(s)	(United States) Trey Knight	Cal State-Northridge	24.14 m (79 ft 2 1/4 in)	8
3rd place, bronze medalist(s)	(United States) Garret Bernt	Northern Arizona	23.09 m (75 ft 9 in)	6
4	(United Kingdom) Ruben Banks	Alabama	23.05 m (75 ft 7 1/4 in)	5
5	(United States) Tarik Robinson-O'Hagan	Ole Miss	22.97 m (75 ft 4 1/4 in)	4
6	(United States) Parker Feuerborn	SE Missouri	22.81 m (74 ft 10 in)	3
7	(United States) Henry Zimmerman	Nebraska	22.63 m (74 ft 2 3/4 in)	2
8	(United States) Jayden White	Washington	22.23 m (72 ft 11 in)	1
9	(Canada) Jeremiah Nubbe	Texas	22.19 m (72 ft 9 1/2 in)	
10	(United States) Jacob Mechler	Texas Tech	21.80 m (71 ft 6 1/4 in)	
11	(Jamaica) Daniel Cope	Clemson	21.70 m (71 ft 2 1/4 in)	
12	(Canada) Rowan Hamilton	California	21.52 m (70 ft 7 in)	
13	(United States) Tyler Sudduth	Illinois	21.48 m (70 ft 5 1/2 in)	
14	(United States) Cam Jones	Iowa State	21.47 m (70 ft 5 1/4 in)	
15	(Canada) Dennis Ohene-Adu	Kentucky	21.35 m (70 ft 1/2 in)	
16	(United States) Johnathan Witte	LSU	20.91 m (68 ft 7 in)	

==== Men's heptathlon ====
Placings in the men's heptathlon at the 2024 NCAA Division I Indoor Track and Field Championships
Rank	Name	University	Overall points	60 m	LJ	SP	HJ	60 m H	PV	1000 m
1st place, gold medalist(s)	(Germany) Leo Neugebauer	Texas	6347	889; 6.98	992; 7.73 m (25 ft 4 1/4 in)	896; 16.72 m (54 ft 10 1/4 in)	887; 2.09 m (6 ft 10 1/4 in)	920; 8.25	960; 5.16 m (16 ft 11 in)	803; 2:46.42
2nd place, silver medalist(s)	(United States) Heath Baldwin	Michigan State	6238	875; 7.02	915; 7.42 m (24 ft 4 in)	843; 15.87 m (52 ft 3/4 in)	915; 2.12 m (6 ft 11 1/4 in)	1005; 7.91	868; 4.86 m (15 ft 11 1/4 in)	817; 2:45.20
3rd place, bronze medalist(s)	(Germany) Till Steinforth	Nebraska	6140	940; 6.84	1002; 7.77 m (25 ft 5 3/4 in)	731; 14.05 m (46 ft 1 in)	803; 2.00 m (6 ft 6 1/2 in)	974; 8.03	929; 5.06 m (16 ft 7 in)	761; 2:50.42
4	(United States) Aiden Ouimet	Illinois	5997	882; 7.00	925; 7.46 m (24 ft 5 1/2 in)	732; 14.06 m (46 ft 1 1/2 in)	776; 1.97 m (6 ft 5 1/2 in)	957; 8.10	837; 4.76 m (15 ft 7 1/4 in)	888; 2:38.73
5	(Spain) Bruno Comin Pescador	Washington	5941	840; 7.12	807; 6.97 m (22 ft 10 1/4 in)	766; 14.62 m (47 ft 11 1/2 in)	831; 2.03 m (6 ft 7 3/4 in)	942; 8.16	868; 4.86 m (15 ft 11 1/4 in)	887; 2:38.75
6	(United States) Austin West	Iowa	5900	879; 7.01	891; 7.32 m (24 ft 0 in)	763; 14.56 m (47 ft 9 in)	776; 1.97 m (6 ft 5 1/2 in)	939; 8.17	719; 4.36 m (14 ft 3 1/2 in)	933; 2:34.73
7	(Australia) Colby Eddowes	Arkansas State	5885	886; 6.99	925; 7.46 m (24 ft 5 1/2 in)	603; 11.94 m (39 ft 2 in)	859; 2.06 m (6 ft 9 in)	984; 7.99	807; 4.66 m (15 ft 3 1/4 in)	821; 2:44.77
8	(United States) Marcus Weaver	Arkansas	5859	792; 7.26	814; 7.00 m (22 ft 11 1/2 in)	805; 15.25 m (50 ft 1/4 in)	803; 2.00 m (6 ft 6 1/2 in)	944; 8.15	807; 4.66 m (15 ft 3 1/4 in)	894; 2:38.12
9	(United States) Daniel Spejcher	Arkansas	5857	854; 7.08	790; 6.90 m (22 ft 7 1/2 in)	806; 15.27 m (50 ft 1 in)	723; 1.91 m (6 ft 3 in)	987; 7.98	898; 4.96 m (16 ft 3 1/4 in)	799; 2:46.81
10	(United States) Grant Levesque	Houston	5842	958; 6.79	783; 6.87 m (22 ft 6 1/4 in)	694; 13.44 m (44 ft 1 in)	696; 1.88 m (6 ft 2 in)	1033; 7.80	1055; 5.46 m (17 ft 10 3/4 in)	623; 3:04.26
11	(Puerto Rico) Yariel Soto Torrado	Arkansas	5783	865; 7.05	908; 7.39 m (24 ft 2 3/4 in)	626; 12.32 m (40 ft 5 in)	723; 1.91 m (6 ft 3 in)	827; 8.64	929; 5.06 m (16 ft 7 in)	905; 2:37.19
12	(United States) Mason Mahacek	Washington State	5472	844; 7.11	746; 6.71 m (22 ft 0 in)	633; 12.43 m (40 ft 9 1/4 in)	776; 1.97 m (6 ft 5 1/2 in)	791; 8.80	837; 4.76 m (15 ft 7 1/4 in)	845; 2:42.60
13	(United States) Sean Murphy	Virginia Tech	4951	809; 7.21	903; 7.37 m (24 ft 2 in)	743; 14.24 m (46 ft 8 1/2 in)	803; 2.00 m (6 ft 6 1/2 in)	908; 8.30	NH	785; 2:48.12
DNF	(Netherlands) Rafael Raap	Oregon	—N/a	739; 7.42	741; 6.69 m (21 ft 11 1/4 in)	767; 14.63 m (47 ft 11 3/4 in)	644; 1.82 m (5 ft 11 1/2 in)	881; 8.41	DNS	DNS
DNF	(United Kingdom) Jack Turner	Arkansas	—N/a	872; 7.03	918; 7.43 m (24 ft 4 1/2 in)	639; 12.54 m (41 ft 1 1/2 in)	749; 1.94 m (6 ft 4 1/4 in)	964; 8.07	NH	DNS
DNF	(Portugal) Edgar Campre	Miami (Fla)	—N/a	911; 6.92	816; 7.01 m (22 ft 11 3/4 in)	DNS	DNS	DNS	DNS	DNS

=== Men's team scores ===
Top 10 men's team scores at the 2024 NCAA Division I Indoor Track and Field Championships
Rank	University	Team score
1st place, gold medalist(s)	Texas Tech	50.5 points
2nd place, silver medalist(s)	Arkansas	41 points
3rd place, bronze medalist(s)	Florida	39 points
4	Northern Arizona	31 points
5	North Carolina	26 points
6	Texas A&M	24 points
7	Oklahoma State	23 points
7	USC	23 points
9	Iowa	21 points
10	Washington	20 points

=== Women's results ===
==== Women's 60 meters ====
Placings in the women's 60 meters at the 2024 NCAA Division I Indoor Track and Field Championships
Rank	Name	University	Time	Team score
1st place, gold medalist(s)	(Jamaica) Brianna Lyston	LSU	7.03	10
2nd place, silver medalist(s)	(United States) Kaila Jackson	Georgia	7.08	8
3rd place, bronze medalist(s)	(United States) Jadyn Mays	Oregon	7.12	6
4	(United States) Jacious Sears	Tennessee	7.13	5
5	(Jamaica) Shenese Walker	Florida State	7.19	4
6	(United States) Grace Stark	Florida	7.20	3
7	(United States) Semira Killebrew	Texas A&M	7.20	2
8	(United States) Alyssa Colbert	Texas Tech	7.22	1

==== Women's 200 meters ====
Placings in the women's 200 meters at the 2024 NCAA Division I Indoor Track and Field Championships
Rank	Name	University	Time	Team score
1st place, gold medalist(s)	(United States) JaMeesia Ford	South Carolina	22.34	10
2nd place, silver medalist(s)	(United States) McKenzie Long	Ole Miss	22.51	8
3rd place, bronze medalist(s)	(United States) Jadyn Mays	Oregon	22.60	6
4	(United States) Kaila Jackson	Georgia	22.63	5
5	(United States) Jacious Sears	Tennessee	22.69	4
6	(United States) Rosey Effiong	Arkansas	23.10	3
7	(Jamaica) Nickisha Pryce	Arkansas	23.18	2
8	(United Kingdom) Amber Anning	Arkansas	23.62	1

==== Women's 400 meters ====
Placings in the women's 400 meters at the 2024 NCAA Division I Indoor Track and Field Championships
Rank	Name	University	Time	Team score
1st place, gold medalist(s)	(United Kingdom) Amber Anning	Arkansas	50.79	10
2nd place, silver medalist(s)	(Jamaica) Nickisha Pryce	Arkansas	51.00	8
3rd place, bronze medalist(s)	(United States) Rosey Effiong	Arkansas	00.00	6
4	(United States) Aaliyah Butler	Georgia	51.64	5
5	(United States) Jermaisha Arnold	Texas A&M	51.83	4
6	(United Kingdom) Yemi John	USC	51.97	3
7	(Canada) Savannah Sutherland	Michigan	52.33	2
8	(Guyana) Kenisha Phillips	Indiana	53.92	1

==== Women's 800 meters ====
Placings in the women's 800 meters at the 2024 NCAA Division I Indoor Track and Field Championships
Rank	Name	University	Time	Team score
1st place, gold medalist(s)	(United States) Juliette Whittaker	Stanford	1:59.53	10
2nd place, silver medalist(s)	(United States) Michaela Rose	LSU	1:59.81	8
3rd place, bronze medalist(s)	(United States) Meghan Hunter	BYU	2:02.15	6
4	(Australia) Hayley Kitching	Penn State	2:02.16	5
5	(Lithuania) Gabija Galvydyte	Oklahoma State	2:02.31	4
6	(Sweden) Wilma Nielsen	Washington	2:02.33	3
7	(United States) Lindsey Butler	Virginia Tech	2:02.39	2
8	(United States) Maggi Congdon	Northern Arizona	2:06.41	1

==== Women's mile ====
Placings in the women's mile at the 2024 NCAA Division I Indoor Track and Field Championships
Rank	Name	University	Time	Team score
1st place, gold medalist(s)	(New Zealand) Maia Ramsden	Harvard	4:25.13	10
2nd place, silver medalist(s)	(Kenya) Billah Jepkirui	Oklahoma State	4:27.14	8
3rd place, bronze medalist(s)	(New Zealand) Kimberley May	Providence	4:27.36	6
4	(United States) Melissa Riggins	Georgetown	4:29.02	5
5	(United States) Margo Appleton	Virginia	4:29.07	4
6	(Canada) Ceili McCabe	West Virginia	4:29.26	3
7	(Poland) Klaudia Kazimierska	Oregon	4:30.65	2
8	(Kenya) Flomena Asekol	Florida	4:35.34	1
9	(United States) Maggie Congdon	Northern Arizona	4:36.71	
10	(United Kingdom) Shannon Flockhart	Providence	4:36.73	

==== Women's 3000 meters ====
Placings in the women's 3000 meters at the 2024 NCAA Division I Indoor Track and Field Championships
Rank	Name	University	Time	Team score
1st place, gold medalist(s)	(United States) Parker Valby	Florida	8:41.50	10
2nd place, silver medalist(s)	(United States) Olivia Markezich	Notre Dame	8:46.51	8
3rd place, bronze medalist(s)	(Kenya) Doris Lemngole	Alabama	8:50.70	6
4	(United States) Lexy Halladay-Lowry	BYU	8:53.08	5
5	(Kenya) Hilda Olemomoi	Alabama	8:55.88	4
6	(United States) Riley Chamberlain	BYU	8:56.89	3
7	(United States) Chloe Scrimgeour	Georgetown	8:57.28	2
8	(United States) Maddy Elmore	Oregon	8:58.52	1
9	(United States) Sadie Sargent	BYU	9:02.90	
10	(United States) Kaylee Mirtchell	Oregon State	9:02.91	
11	(United States) Melissa Riggins	Georgetown	9:15.87	
12	(Kenya) Billah Jepkirui	Oklahoma State	9:16.97	
	(Netherlands) Amina Maatoug	Duke	DNF	
	(Kenya) Flomena Asekol	Florida	DNF	
	(United States) Taylor Roe	Oklahoma State	DNF	
	(New Zealand) Maia Ramsden	Harvard	DNS	

==== Women's 5000 meters ====
Placings in the women's 5000 meters at the 2024 NCAA Division I Indoor Track and Field Championships
Rank	Name	University	Time	Team score
1st place, gold medalist(s)	(United States) Parker Valby	Florida	14:52.79	10
2nd place, silver medalist(s)	(United States) Taylor Roe	Oklahoma State	15:15.01	8
3rd place, bronze medalist(s)	(Kenya) Hilda Olemomoi	Alabama	15:17.27	6
4	(Kenya) Doris Lemngole	Alabama	15:17.43	5
5	(United States) Lexy Halladay-Lowry	BYU	15:20.73	4
6	(United States) Molly Born	Oklahoma State	15:20.89	3
7	(United States) Chloe Scrimgeour	Georgetown	15:21.80	2
8	(United States) Grace Hartman	NC State	15:28.57	1
9	(United States) Jenna Hutchins	BYU	15:31.42	
10	(United Kingdom) Phoebe Anderson	Columbia	15:37.21	
11	(United States) Aubrey Frentheway	BYU	15:37.30	
12	(United States) Ella Baran	Colorado	15:38.72	
13	(United States) Samantha Bush	NC State	15:40.83	
14	(United States) Kenzie Doyle	UMass Lowell	15:49.30	
15	(Canada) Gracelyn Larkin	Northern Arizona	16:03.80	
16	(United States) Lucy Jenks	Stanford	16:07.16	

==== Women's 60 meter hurdles ====
Placings in the women's 60 meter hurdle at the 2024 NCAA Division I Indoor Track and Field Championships
Rank	Name	University	Time	Team score
1st place, gold medalist(s)	(United States) Jasmine Jones	USC	7.77	10
2nd place, silver medalist(s)	(United States) Grace Stark	Florida	7.81	8
3rd place, bronze medalist(s)	(United States) Alia Armstrong	LSU	7.94	6
4	(United States) Destiny Huven	Arkansas	7.99	5
5	(United States) Leah Phillips	LSU	8.00	4
6	(United States) Aasia Laurencin	Michigan	8.04	3
7	(United States) Aaliyah McCormick	Oregon	8.26	2
8	(Jamaica) Rosealee Cooper	Mississippi State	8.27	1

==== Women's 4 × 400 meters relay ====
Placings in the women's 4 × 400 meters at the 2024 NCAA Division I Indoor Track and Field Championships
Rank	University	Time	Team score
1st place, gold medalist(s)	South Carolina	3:26.20	10
2nd place, silver medalist(s)	USC	3:27.62	8
3rd place, bronze medalist(s)	Houston	3:28.28	6
4	Texas	3:28.91	5
5	Tennessee	3:29.79	4
6	Georgia	3:30.07	3
7	Oregon	3:30.89	2
8	LSU	3:31.05	1
9	Penn	3:31.82	
10	UCLA	3:33.13	
11	Texas A&M	3:36.11	
	Arkansas	DQ	

==== Women's distance medley relay ====
Placings in the women's distance medley relay at the 2024 NCAA Division I Indoor Track and Field Championships
Rank	University	Time	Team score
1st place, gold medalist(s)	BYU	10:51.42	10
2nd place, silver medalist(s)	Notre Dame	10:53.14	8
3rd place, bronze medalist(s)	Florida	10:54.40	6
4	Arkansas	10:56.15	5
5	Oregon	10:57.24	4
6	Providence	10:57.34	3
7	Oklahoma State	10:57.54	2
8	Penn State	10:57.65	1
9	Boston College	10:58.67	
10	Stanford	11:03.99	
11	Washington	11:04.06	
12	Virginia	11:11.25	

==== Women's high jump ====
Placings in the women's high jump at the 2024 NCAA Division I Indoor Track and Field Championships
Rank	Name	University	Best Jump	Team score
1st place, gold medalist(s)	(United States) Rachel Glenn	Arkansas	2.00 m (6 ft 6 1/2 in)	10
2nd place, silver medalist(s)	(Jamaica) Lamara Distin	Texas A&M	1.97 m (6 ft 5 1/2 in)	8
3rd place, bronze medalist(s)	(Cyprus) Elena Kulichenko	Georgia	1.91 m (6 ft 3 in)	6
4	(Nigeria) Temitope Adeshina	Texas Tech	1.91 m (6 ft 3 in)	5
5	(Czech Republic) Bára Sajdoková	Illinois	1.88 m (6 ft 2 in)	4
6	(Jamaica) Roschell Clayton	Villanova	1.88 m (6 ft 2 in)	2.5
6	(United States) Jenna Rogers	Nebraska	1.88 m (6 ft 2 in)	2.5
8	(Ghana) Rose Yeboah	Illinois	1.88 m (6 ft 2 in)	1
9	(United States) Sanaa Barnes	Auburn	1.85 m (6 ft 3/4 in)	
10	(Estonia) Lilian Turban	Hawaii	1.85 m (6 ft 3/4 in)	
11	(United States) Charity Hufnagel	Kentucky	1.85 m (6 ft 3/4 in)	
12	(United States) Destiny Masters	Wichita State	1.85 m (6 ft 3/4 in)	
13	(United States) Miracle Ailes	Alabama	1.80 m (5 ft 10 3/4 in)	
14	(Grenada) Sharie Enoe	Kansas State	1.75 m (5 ft 8 3/4 in)	
15	(United States) Alyssa Jones	Stanford	1.75 m (5 ft 8 3/4 in)	
	(United States) Cierra Allphin	BYU	NH	

==== Women's pole vault ====
Placings in the women's pole vault at the 2024 NCAA Division I Indoor Track and Field Championships
Rank	Name	University	Best Jump	Team score
1st place, gold medalist(s)	(United States) Hana Moll	Washington	4.60 m (15 ft 1 in)	10
2nd place, silver medalist(s)	(United States) Riley Felts	Charlotte	4.50 m (14 ft 9 in)	8
3rd place, bronze medalist(s)	(United States) Chloe Timberg	Rutgers	4.45 m (14 ft 7 in)	5.5
3rd place, bronze medalist(s)	(United States) Sydney Horn	High Point	4.45 m (14 ft 7 in)	5.5
5	(United States) Olivia Lueking	Oklahoma	4.40 m (14 ft 5 in)	4
6	(United States) Tori Thomas	Illinois	4.40 m (14 ft 5 in)	2.5
6	(Canada) Heather Abadie	Texas A&M	4.40 m (14 ft 5 in)	2.5
8	(United States) Jessica Mercier	Indiana	4.40 m (14 ft 5 in)	1
9	(United States) Molly Haywood	Baylor	4.40 m (14 ft 5 in)	
10	(United States) Alencia Lentz	Baylor	4.30 m (14 ft 1 1/4 in)	
11	(United States) Nastassja Campbell	Washington	4.30 m (14 ft 1 1/4 in)	
11	(Estonia) Marleen Mülla	South Dakota	4.30 m (14 ft 1 1/4 in)	
13	(United States) Ka'Leila Abrille	UCLA	4.15 m (13 ft 7 1/4 in)	
13	(United States) Tessa Mudd	Princeton	4.15 m (13 ft 7 1/4 in)	
15	(United States) Mason Meinershagen	Kansas	4.15 m (13 ft 7 1/4 in)	
15	(United States) Eva Lowder	Washington State	4.15 m (13 ft 7 1/4 in)	

==== Women's long jump ====
Placings in the women's long jump at the 2024 NCAA Division I Indoor Track and Field Championships
Rank	Name	University	Best Jump	Team score
1st place, gold medalist(s)	(United States) Sydney Willits	Iowa State	6.74 m (22 ft 1 1/4 in)	10
2nd place, silver medalist(s)	(United States) Claire Bryant	Florida	6.71 m (22 ft 0 in)	8
3rd place, bronze medalist(s)	(United States) Alyssa Jones	Stanford	6.66 m (21 ft 10 in)	6
4	(Jamaica) Nia Robinson	Arkansas	6.56 m (21 ft 6 1/4 in)	5
5	(United States) Alexis Brown	Baylor	6.48 m (21 ft 3 in)	4
6	(Norway) Ida Breigan	UTSA	6.38 m (20 ft 11 in)	3
7	(Republic of Ireland) Elizabeth Ndudi	Illinois	6.35 m (20 ft 10 in)	2
8	(Jamaica) Aaliyah Foster	Texas	6.35 m (20 ft 10 in)	1
9	(United States) Tionna Tobias	Iowa	6.32 m (20 ft 8 3/4 in)	
10	(United Kingdom) Funminiyi Olajide	SMU	6.32 m (20 ft 8 3/4 in)	
11	(Russia) Victoria Gorlova	Virginia Tech	6.31 m (20 ft 8 1/4 in)	
12	(Jamaica) Ackelia Smith	Texas	6.21 m (20 ft 4 1/4 in)	
13	(United States) Tacoria Humphrey	Illinois	6.20 m (20 ft 4 in)	
14	(Grenada) Joniar Thomas	Texas A&M	6.11 m (20 ft 1/2 in)	
15	(Sweden) Emilia Sjöstrand	San Jose State	6.06 m (19 ft 10 1/2 in)	
16	(United States) Sophia Beckmon	Illinois	6.02 m (19 ft 9 in)	

==== Women's triple jump ====
Placings in the women's triple jump at the 2024 NCAA Division I Indoor Track and Field Championships
Rank	Name	University	Best Jump	Team score
1st place, gold medalist(s)	(Latvia) Rūta Kate Lasmane	Texas Tech	14.47 m (47 ft 5 1/2 in)	10
2nd place, silver medalist(s)	(Sweden) Emilia Sjöstrand	San Jose State	13.72 m (45 ft 0 in)	8
3rd place, bronze medalist(s)	(Saint Vincent and the Grenadines) Mikeisha Welcome	Georgia	13.71 m (44 ft 11 3/4 in)	6
4	(Russia) Victoria Gorlova	Virginia Tech	13.65 m (44 ft 9 1/4 in)	5
5	(Jamaica) Rhianna Phipps	Nebraska	13.59 m (44 ft 7 in)	4
6	(Latvia) Darja Sopova	Illinois	13.58 m (44 ft 6 1/2 in)	3
7	(Kenya) Winny Bii	Oklahoma State	13.42 m (44 ft 1/4 in)	2
8	(United Kingdom) Temitope Ojora	USC	13.34 m (43 ft 9 in)	1
9	(United States) Xiamara Young	San Diego State	13.26 m (43 ft 6 in)	
10	(France) Anne-Suzanna Fosther-Katta	Texas Tech	13.23 m (43 ft 4 3/4 in)	
11	(United States) Simone Johnson	Auburn	13.17 m (43 ft 2 1/2 in)	
12	(Jamaica) Shantae Foreman	Clemson	13.16 m (43 ft 2 in)	
13	(Malta) Rachela Pace	Fresno State	13.03 m (42 ft 8 3/4 in)	
14	(Canada) Busola Akinduro	California	12.89 m (42 ft 3 1/4 in)	
15	(France) Daniela Wamokpego	Iowa	12.66 m (41 ft 6 1/4 in)	
	(Jamaica) Ackelia Smith	Texas	DNS	

==== Women's shot put ====
Placings in the women's shot put at the 2024 NCAA Division I Indoor Track and Field Championships
Rank	Name	University	Best Throw	Team score
1st place, gold medalist(s)	(United States) Mya Lesnar	Colorado State	18.53 m (60 ft 9 1/2 in)	10
2nd place, silver medalist(s)	(United States) Jaida Ross	Oregon	18.47 m (60 ft 7 in)	8
3rd place, bronze medalist(s)	(United States) Jalani Davis	Ole Miss	18.15 m (59 ft 6 1/2 in)	6
4	(Germany) Nina Ndubuisi	Texas	18.07 m (59 ft 3 1/4 in)	5
5	(Netherlands) Alida Van Daalen	Florida	17.74 m (58 ft 2 1/4 in)	4
6	(United States) Jayden Ulrich	Louisville	17.62 m (57 ft 9 1/2 in)	3
7	(South Africa) Miné de Klerk	Nebraska	17.11 m (56 ft 1 1/2 in)	2
8	(United States) Chrystal Herpin	Texas	17.09 m (56 ft 3/4 in)	1
9	(United States) MyeJoi Williams	Alabama	16.69 m (54 ft 9 in)	
10	(United States) Marilyn Nwora	Texas	16.64 m (54 ft 7 in)	
11	(United States) KeAyla Dove	North Texas	16.48 m (54 ft 3/4 in)	
12	(United States) Jasmine Mitchell	Ole Miss	16.37 m (53 ft 8 1/4 in)	
13	(United States) Gabby Morris	Colorado State	16.25 m (53 ft 3 3/4 in)	
14	(United States) Paige Low	Oklahoma	16.23 m (53 ft 2 3/4 in)	
15	(United States) MaKayla Mason	Duke	15.72 m (51 ft 6 3/4 in)	
16	(United States) Mensi Stiff	Ole Miss	15.62 m (51 ft 2 3/4 in)	

==== Women's weight throw ====
Placings in the women's weight throw at the 2024 NCAA Division I Indoor Track and Field Championships
Rank	Name	University	Best Throw	Team score
1st place, gold medalist(s)	(United States) Jalani Davis	Ole Miss	24.80 m (81 ft 4 1/4 in)	10
2nd place, silver medalist(s)	(United States) Shelby Frank	Minnesota	22.69 m (74 ft 5 1/4 in)	8
3rd place, bronze medalist(s)	(United States) Jasmine Mitchell	Ole Miss	22.15 m (72 ft 8 in)	6
4	(Iceland) Gudrun Hallgrimsdottir	VCU	21.07 m (69 ft 1 1/2 in)	5
5	(Jamaica) Marie Forbes	Clemson	21.76 m (71 ft 4 1/2 in)	4
6	(United States) Giavonna Meeks	Vanderbilt	21.73 m (71 ft 3 1/2 in)	3
7	(United States) Olivia Roberts	Wisconsin	21.71 m (71 ft 2 1/2 in)	2
8	(Finland) Sara Killinen	Virginia Tech	21.53 m (70 ft 7 1/2 in)	1
9	(United States) Chloe Lindeman	Wisconsin	21.52 m (70 ft 7 in)	
10	(United States) Chandler Hayden	Alabama	21.37 m (70 ft 1 1/4 in)	
11	(United States) Monique Hardy	Kansas State	21.19 m (69 ft 6 1/4 in)	
12	(United Kingdom) Tara Simpson-Sullivan	Rice	20.92 m (68 ft 7 1/2 in)	
13	(United Kingdom) Amber Simpson	Illinois	20.72 m (67 ft 11 1/2 in)	
14	(United States) Kenna Curry	North Dakota	20.51 m (67 ft 3 1/4 in)	
15	(United States) Foluke Olujide-Ajibade	Pittsburgh	20.50 m (67 ft 3 in)	
16	(United States) Anthonett Nabwe	Minnesota	20.08 m (65 ft 10 1/2 in)	

==== Women's pentathlon ====
Placings in the women's pentathlon at the 2024 NCAA Division I Indoor Track and Field Championships
Rank	Name	University	Overall points	60 m H	HJ	SP	LJ	800 m
1st place, gold medalist(s)	(United States) Jadin O'brien	Notre Dame	4497	8.35	1.69 m (5 ft 6 1/2 in)	14.34 m (47 ft 1/2 in)	6.07 m (19 ft 10 3/4 in)	2:13.30
2nd place, silver medalist(s)	(United States) Jenelle Rogers	Ball State	4430	8.50	1.75 m (5 ft 8 3/4 in)	13.96 m (45 ft 9 1/2 in)	6.28 m (20 ft 7 in)	2:24.08
3rd place, bronze medalist(s)	(Latvia) Kristine Blazevica	Texas	4427	8.45	1.72 m (5 ft 7 1/2 in)	12.43 m (40 ft 9 1/4 in)	6.20 m (20 ft 4 in)	2:13.19
4	(United States) Allie Jones	USC	4369	8.20	1.63 m (5 ft 4 in)	12.56 m (41 ft 2 1/4 in)	6.30 m (20 ft 8 in)	2:16.43
5	(Latvia) Eliza Kraule	Rice	4353	8.45	1.75 m (5 ft 8 3/4 in)	11.98 m (39 ft 3 1/2 in)	6.36 m (20 ft 10 1/4 in)	2:22.74
6	(United States) Destiny Masters	Wichita State	4338	8.32	1.84 m (6 ft 1/4 in)	11.61 m (38 ft 1 in)	6.06 m (19 ft 10 1/2 in)	2:25.62
7	(Sweden) Angel Richmore	Oklahoma	4320	8.77	1.75 m (5 ft 8 3/4 in)	14.11 m (46 ft 3 1/2 in)	6.04 m (19 ft 9 3/4 in)	2:23.09
8	(United States) Avery McMullen	Colorado	4259	8.24	1.69 m (5 ft 6 1/2 in)	11.61 m (38 ft 1 in)	6.16 m (20 ft 2 1/2 in)	2:21.13
9	(Estonia) Pippi Lotta Enok	Oklahoma	4209	8.59	1.69 m (5 ft 6 1/2 in)	12.13 m (39 ft 9 1/2 in)	6.16 m (20 ft 2 1/2 in)	2:21.65
10	(United States) Alaina Brady	Notre Dame	4101	8.50	1.69 m (5 ft 6 1/2 in)	11.46 m (37 ft 7 in)	5.84 m (19 ft 1 3/4 in)	2:20.53
11	(United States) Charity Hufnagel	Kentucky	4059	8.91	1.78 m (5 ft 10 in)	12.48 m (40 ft 11 1/4 in)	5.57 m (18 ft 3 1/4 in)	2:24.47
12	(United States) Juliette Laracuente-Huebner	Cincinnati	4040	8.72	1.78 m (5 ft 10 in)	9.52 m (31 ft 2 3/4 in)	6.01 m (19 ft 8 1/2 in)	2:24.19
13	(United States) Lydia Bottelier	Pittsburgh	4000	8.77	1.75 m (5 ft 8 3/4 in)	11.16 m (36 ft 7 1/4 in)	5.56 m (18 ft 2 3/4 in)	2:21.58
14	(Lithuania) Olivija Vaitaityte	Oklahoma State	3988	9.11	1.69 m (5 ft 6 1/2 in)	11.98 m (39 ft 3 1/2 in)	5.60 m (18 ft 4 1/4 in)	2:16.60
15	(United States) Brianna Smith	Duke	3923	8.88	1.75 m (5 ft 8 3/4 in)	11.57 m (37 ft 11 1/2 in)	5.58 m (18 ft 3 1/2 in)	2:28.17
DNF	(United States) Annika Williams	Oregon	0000	17.31	DNS	DNS	DNS	DNS

=== Women's team scores ===
Top 10 women's team scores at the 2024 NCAA Division I Indoor Track and Field Championships
Rank	University	Team score
1st place, gold medalist(s)	Arkansas	55 points
2nd place, silver medalist(s)	Florida	50 points
3rd place, bronze medalist(s)	Georgia	33 points
4	Oregon	31 points
5	Ole Miss	30 points
6	LSU	29 points
7	BYU	28 points
8	Oklahoma State	27 points
8	USC	27 points
10	Notre Dame	26 points

== Schedule ==
Schedule of the 2024 NCAA Division I Indoor Track and Field Championships
Date	Category	Time (ET)	Event	Round division
Friday, March 8	Men's heptathlon	9:30 a.m.	60 meters	Heptathlon men
Friday, March 8	Men's heptathlon	10:30 a.m.	Long jump	Heptathlon men
Friday, March 8	Men's heptathlon	11:15 p.m.	Shot put	Heptathlon men
Friday, March 8	Men's heptathlon	1:15 p.m.	High jump	Heptathlon men
Friday, March 8	Women Pentathlon	9:50 a.m.	60 meters	Pentathlon women
Friday, March 8	Women Pentathlon	11:00 a.m.	High jump	Pentathlon women
Friday, March 8	Women Pentathlon	1:00 p.m.	Shot put	Pentathlon women
Friday, March 8	Women Pentathlon	2:15 p.m.	Long jump	Pentathlon women
Friday, March 8	Women Pentathlon	3:40 p.m.	800 meters	Pentathlon women
Friday, March 8	Field events	2:00 p.m.	Pole vault	Final men
Friday, March 8	Field events	2:45 p.m.	Weight throw	Final men
Friday, March 8	Field events	4:00 p.m.	Long jump	Final men
Friday, March 8	Field events	6:00 p.m.	Pole vault	Final women
Friday, March 8	Field events	6:00 p.m.	Weight throw	Final women
Friday, March 8	Field events	7:00 p.m.	Long jump	Final women
Friday, March 8	Men's track events	4:00 p.m.	Mile	Semifinal men
Friday, March 8	Men's track events	4:18 p.m.	60 meters	Semifinal men
Friday, March 8	Men's track events	4:30 p.m.	400 meters	Semifinal men
Friday, March 8	Men's track events	4:50 p.m.	800 meters	Semifinal men
Friday, March 8	Men's track events	5:05 p.m.	60 meter hurdles	Semifinal men
Friday, March 8	Men's track events	5:20 p.m.	5000 meters	Final men
Friday, March 8	Men's track events	5:40 p.m.	200 meters	Semifinal men
Friday, March 8	Men's track events	6:00 p.m.	Distance medley relay	Final men
Friday, March 8	Women's track events	7:00 p.m.	Mile	Semifinal women
Friday, March 8	Women's track events	7:18 p.m.	60 meters	Semifinal women
Friday, March 8	Women's track events	7:30 p.m.	400 meters	Semifinal women
Friday, March 8	Women's track events	7:50 p.m.	800 meters	Semifinal women
Friday, March 8	Women's track events	8:05 p.m.	60 meter hurdles	Semifinal women
Friday, March 8	Women's track events	8:20 p.m.	5000 meters	Final women
Friday, March 8	Women's track events	8:40 p.m.	200 meters	Semifinal women
Friday, March 8	Women's track events	9:00 p.m.	Distance medley relay	Final women
Saturday, March 9	Men Heptathlon	10:30 a.m.	60 hurdles	Heptathlon men
Saturday, March 9	Men Heptathlon	11:30 a.m.	Pole vault	Heptathlon men
Saturday, March 9	Men Heptathlon	3:30 p.m.	1000 meters	Heptathlon men
Saturday, March 9	Field events	1:00 p.m.	High jump	Final men
Saturday, March 9	Field events	2:45 p.m.	Shot put	Final men
Saturday, March 9	Field events	3:30 p.m.	Triple jump	Final men
Saturday, March 9	Field events	1:00 p.m.	High jump	Final women
Saturday, March 9	Field events	5:45 p.m.	Shot put	Final women
Saturday, March 9	Field events	6:30 p.m.	Triple jump	Final women
Saturday, March 9	Men's track events	4:00 p.m.	Mile	Final men
Saturday, March 9	Men's track events	4:10 p.m.	60 meters	Final men
Saturday, March 9	Men's track events	4:20 p.m.	400 meters	Final men
Saturday, March 9	Men's track events	4:30 p.m.	800 meters	Final men
Saturday, March 9	Men's track events	4:40 p.m.	60 meter hurdles	Final men
Saturday, March 9	Men's track events	4:50 p.m.	200 meters	Final men
Saturday, March 9	Men's track events	5:00 p.m.	3000 meters	Final men
Saturday, March 9	Men's track events	5:20 p.m.	4 × 400 meters relay	Final men
Saturday, March 9	Women's track events	7:00 p.m.	Mile	Final women
Saturday, March 9	Women's track events	7:10 p.m.	60 meters	Final women
Saturday, March 9	Women's track events	7:20 p.m.	400 meters	Final women
Saturday, March 9	Women's track events	7:30 p.m.	800 meters	Final women
Saturday, March 9	Women's track events	7:40 p.m.	60 meter hurdles	Final women
Saturday, March 9	Women's track events	7:50 p.m.	200 meters	Final women
Saturday, March 9	Women's track events	8:00 p.m.	3000 meters	Final women
Saturday, March 9	Women's track events	8:20 p.m.	4 × 400 meters relay	Final women

== See also ==
- National Collegiate Athletic Association (NCAA)
- NCAA Men's Division I Indoor Track and Field Championships
- NCAA Women's Division I Indoor Track and Field Championships
