= Team New Balance Boston =

Group of professional distance runners

- Short name: TNBB
- Sport: Athletics
- Founded: 2014
- Location: Boston, Massachusetts
- Head coach: Mark Coogan
- Main sponsor: New Balance

Team New Balance Boston (TNBB) is a training group of professional distance runners sponsored by New Balance and based out of Boston, Massachusetts, United States. The team is coached by Mark Coogan and was founded in 2014.

== Notable successes ==
At the 2020 United States Olympic trials, TNBB teammates Elle Purrier St. Pierre and Heather MacLean finished in gold and bronze position, with the silver medal going to former teammate Cory McGee. All three ran a new personal best, and Purrier set a new meet record.

Purrier has set four national records while representing TNBB by running the indoor mile in 4:16.85 on February 8, 2020, and then lowering that time to 4:16.41 on February 11, 2024. She broke the indoor two mile record by running 9:10.28 on February 13, 2021. She also holds the American indoor 3000m record by running 8:20.87 on March 2, 2024.

On April 15, 2022, TNBB teammates MacLean and Purrier ran alongside Kendall Ellis and Roisin Willis setting a distance medley relay world record with a time of 10:33.85 at the grand opening of the TRACK at New Balance.

At the 2024 World Athletics Indoor Championships, Purrier won the 3000m by running 8:20.87, making her the not only the American record holder, but also claiming the 3rd fastest time ever. The following day, Emily Mackay earned bronze in the 1500m by running 4:02.69.

== Roster ==
=== Men ===
- Christian Noble (2022)
- Derek Johnson

=== Women ===
- Katrina Coogan (2016)
- Millie Paladino (2021)
- Kate Mitchell
- Elle Purrier St. Pierre (2018)
- Roisin Willis (2026)
- Margot Appleton (2025)
- Shannon Flockhart (2025)
- Kimberley May (2026)
- Alexandra Millard (2025)
- Lea Meyer

Former Members

- Kemoy Campbell (2016–2018)
- Abbey Cooper (2014–2019)
- Liz Costello (2014–2018)
- Cory McGee (2014–2018)
- Natosha Rogers (2014–2017)
- Emily Durgin (2017–2019)
- Heather MacLean (2018-2025)
- Siofra Cleirigh Buttner (2019)
- Lianne Farber
- Megan Krumpoch
- Drew Piazza (2021)
- Kristie Schoffield (2022)
- Sarah McDonald (2022)
- Emily Mackay (2022-2025)
- Sean Peterson (2022)
- Parker Valby (2024)
- Julie-Anne Staehli (2022)
