= Taylor Roe =

American athlete (born 2000)

Personal information
- Born: October 13, 2000 (age 25)

Sport
- Sport: Athletics
- Event: Long-distance running

Achievements and titles
- Personal best(s): 3000m: 8:51.60 (2024); 5000m: 14:49.91 (2025); 10000m: 30:58.66 (2025); Road; 10 miles: 49:53 (2025); Half marathon: 1:06:20 (2026)
Medal record
Representing United States
NACAC Championships
Gold medal – first place	2025 Freeport	10,000 m

Taylor Roe (born 13 October 2000) is an American long-distance runner. She holds the American records for the road 10 km and 15 km.

== Early life ==
From the state of Washington, she attended Lake Stevens High School, graduating in 2019 having won nine individual state titles in cross country and track.

== NCAA ==
She competed for Oklahoma State University and had a second-place finish at the 2020 NCAA Division I cross country championships. She won the 2022 NCAA Indoor Championships over 3000 metres with a time of 8:58.95. She took the silver medal in the 2024 NCAA Indoor Championships over 5000 metres in March 2024, finishing runner-up to Parker Valby. She placed third in 10,000 metres and sixth in the 5,000 metres for Oklahoma State University at the 2024 NCAA Outdoor Championships in June 2024 in Eugene, Oregon.

== Professional career ==
She turned professional with an endorsement deal with Puma in July 2024.

In March 2025, she won the USATF Half Marathon Championships in Atlanta, Georgia with a personal best time of 1:07.22.

In April 2025, she won the USATF 10 Mile Championships and became the first woman to run under 50 minutes for the distance on the road. In running a time of 49:53, Roe broke the previous best, set by Evaline Chirchir in 2019, by nearly 40 seconds, and she broke Keira D'Amato’s best American time by over a minute. She also set a new American best in the 10 km (30:56) and 15 km (46.24) en-route at the event, part of the Cherry Blossom Ten Mile Run. Later that month she finished third at the Boston 5k and ran a time of 14:57, her first time under 15:00.

She lowered her personal best to 14:49.91 for the 5000 metres at the Sunset Tour Los Angeles on 12 July 2025. She finished in third place overall in the 10,000 metres at the 2025 USA Outdoor Track and Field Championships. At the same championships, she placed seventh in the final of the 5000 metres. Later that month, she won the 10,000 metres at the 2025 NACAC Championships in Freeport, The Bahamas in a championship record 32:19.84.

In September 2025, she competed over 10,000 metres at the 2025 World Championships in Tokyo, Japan. At the Houston Half Marathon on 11 January 2026, Roe was the top-placed American, finishing in 1:06:20 to move to second on the American all-time list, eleven seconds outside Weini Kelati's American record.

== Statistics ==
=== International competitions ===
Representing the United States
Year	Competition	Venue	Position	Event	Time
2025	NACAC Championships	Freeport, The Bahamas	1st	10,000 m	32:19.84
2025	World Championships	Tokyo, Japan	18th	10,000 m	32:12.19

=== National championships ===
Year	Competition	Venue	Position	Event	Time
2024	USA Olympic Trials	Eugene, Oregon	8th	5000m	15:15.37
2025	USA Half Marathon Championships	Atlanta, Georgia	1st	Half Marathon	1:07:22
2025	USA 10-Mile Championships	Washington, D.C.	1st	10-mile	49:53
2025	USA 4-Mile Championships	Peoria, Illinois	1st	4-mile	19:41
2025	USATF Outdoor Championships	Eugene, Oregon	3rd	10000m	31:45.41
2025	USATF Outdoor Championships	Eugene, Oregon	7th	5000m	15:21.36
