= Parker Valby =

American athlete (born 2002)

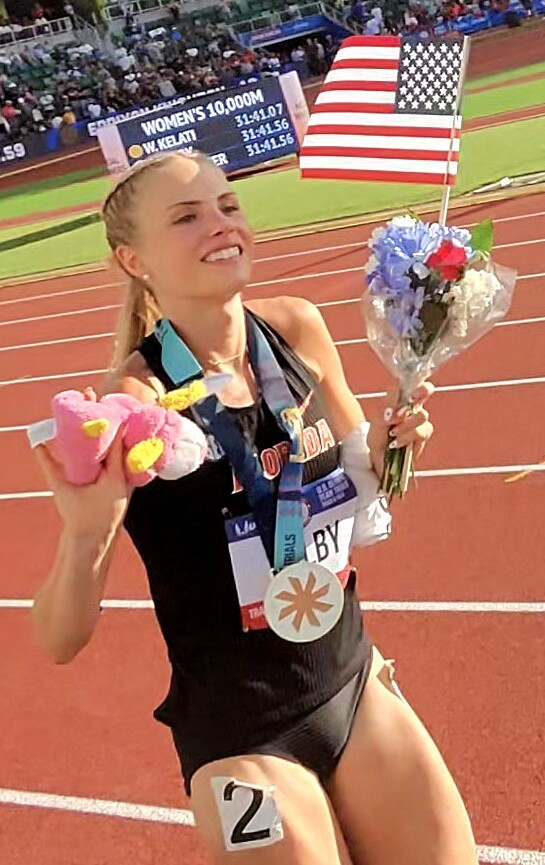
- Valby in 2024

Personal information
- Full name: Parker Alys Valby
- Born: September 27, 2002 (age 24) Pennsylvania
- Home town: Tampa, Florida
- Employer: New Balance
- Height: 5 ft 8 in (173 cm)

Sport
- Sport: Athletics
- Events: 3000m, 5000m, 10000m
- College team: University of Florida
- Team: New Balance Boston
- Turned pro: October 17, 2024
- Coached by: Mark Coogan

Achievements and titles
- Personal bests: 3000 m: 8:34.95 i (New York City, 2025); 5000 m: 14:39.88 (Los Angeles, 2026); 10,000 m: 30:50.43 (Azusa, 2024)
Medal record
Women's athletics
Representing the United States
Representing Florida Gators/ Southeastern Conference
NCAA Cross Country Championships
Gold medal – first place	2023 Charlottesville	6km
Silver medal – second place	2022 Stillwater	6km
NCAA Indoor Track and Field Championships
Gold medal – first place	2024 Boston	3000 meters
Gold medal – first place	2024 Boston	5000 meters
NCAA Outdoor Track and Field Championships
Gold medal – first place	2023 Austin	5000 meters
Gold medal – first place	2024 Eugene	5000 meters
Gold medal – first place	2024 Eugene	10000 meters
Silver medal – second place	2022 Eugene	5000 meters

Parker Alys Valby (born September 27, 2002) is a professional American track and field and cross-country athlete. She is a six-time NCAA champion and former NCAA record holder for the outdoor 5000 m and the outdoor 10,000 m.

== Early life ==
From East Lake, Pinellas County, Florida, she attended East Lake High School. She was a competitive swimmer before first running cross-country in 2016. When asked to try track and field as well, she was initially reluctant as it meant having to give up lacrosse. She became the Florida state champion and the Florida state all-time record holder whilst still a junior. However, she was unable to compete during her senior year due to the COVID-19 pandemic.

== Collegiate career ==
Valby competed for the University of Florida. Her sophomore year she finished runner-up to Katelyn Tuohy in the 5000m at the NCAA Track and Field Championships by running a personal best of 15:20.10. This second-place performance helped Florida win the team title.

The following fall, Valby once again finished runner-up to Tuohy but this time at the NCAA Cross Country Championships in Oklahoma. That spring, she won the 5000 m at the 2023 NCAA Track and Field Championships helping Florida finish as team runner-up.

Valby started out her redshirt junior season strong by winning the Wisconsin Nuttycombe invite over rival Katelyn Tuohy in a course time of 19:17.2.

In November 2023, she won the NCAA Cross Country Championship in Charlottesville, Virginia. She ran a new NCAA record time of 18:55.2 for the 6 km course to win by 10 seconds ahead of Doris Lemngole of the University of Alabama.

On December 2, 2023, Valby set a new NCAA record for the indoor 5000 m while competing at Boston University. Her time of 14:56.11 eclipsed the mark of 15:12.22 set by Emily Sisson in 2015.

At the 2024 NCAA Division I Indoor Track and Field Championships, Valby broke her own collegiate record in the 5000m and picked up another NCAA title, running 14:52.79 in Boston. She negative split the race, running 7:33 for first half and 7:19 for her second. She had a comfortable margin of victory ahead of 2nd placer Taylor Roe who finished in 15:15. The next day she also won the 3000 m indoor national championship in a personal record of 8:41.50.

In April 2024, she ran a time of 30:50.43 for the 10,000 metres at the Bryan Clay Invitational in Azusa, California. It was a new American collegiate record, previously held by Lisa Uhl. Valby set a new championship record winning the 5000 m at the SEC Championship in Gainesville, Florida on May 11, 2024.

Year	SEC Cross Country	NCAA South Regional Cross Country	NCAA Cross Country	SEC Indoor Track	NCAA Indoor Track	SEC Outdoor Track	NCAA Outdoor Track
2021–22	4th	2nd	27th	-	-	2nd - 5000m	2nd - 5000m
2022–23	1st	1st	2nd	-	-	1st - 5000m	1st - 5000m
2023–24	1st	1st	1st	1st - 3000m; 1st DMR	1st - 5000m; 1st - 3000m	1st - 5000m	1st - 10000m; 1st - 5000m

== Professional career ==
Valby competed in the 2024 Olympic trials held in Eugene, Oregon. She finished fourth in the 5,000m event, one spot out of making the Olympic team. She returned for the 10000m event later in the trials, where she finished second behind Weini Kelati. After finishing in the top three for the 10,000 m, Valby was selected for the Olympics based on her World Athletics ranking. She competed in the 10,000 m at the 2024 Summer Olympics in Paris in August 2024, placing eleventh in the final in 30:59.28.

On October 17, 2024, Valby announced that she had signed a professional contract with New Balance to join New Balance Boston to be coached by Mark Coogan. After racing indoors on February 2, 2025, in which she set a new personal best over 3000 m, Valby did not race again until November 1, 2025, due to a broken bone in her foot. In the interim, she returned to Gainesville to train under her former coach Will Palmer.

In her first outdoor track race for 19 months, Valby won in a personal best of 14:49.41 over 5000 metres at the LA Track Fest on 23 May 2026. On 13 June, Valby won the 5000 m at the USATF LA Grand Prix in a new personal best time of 14:39.88, the eighth-fastest time by an American in the event. On 26 July, Valby placed third in the 5000 metres at the 2026 USA Outdoor Track and Field Championships in New York with a time of 15:06.25.

== Sponsorship ==
In June 2023, Valby signed an endorsement agreement with sportswear brand Nike. In doing so, she became the first female college track and field athlete to have a name, image, and likeness agreement with this brand.

== Honors and awards ==
- The Bowerman, 2024
- Roy F. Kramer SEC Female Athlete of the Year, 2024
- Track & Field News Collegiate Outdoor Athlete Of The Year, 2024
- USTFCCCA NCAA Division I National Outdoor Women's Runner of the Year, 2024
- USTFCCCA NCAA Division I National Indoor Women's Runner of the Year, 2024
- Honda Sports Award: Cross Country, 2024
- USTFCCCA Lance Harter Collegiate National Athlete of the Year: Cross Country 2023

== Achievements ==
=== International competitions ===
Representing the United States
Year	Competition	Venue	Position	Event	Time
2024	Olympic Games	Paris, France	11th	10000m	30:59.28

=== National championships ===
Year	Competition	Venue	Position	Event	Time
2024	USA Olympic Trials	Eugene, Oregon	4th	5000 m	14:51.44
2024	USA Olympic Trials	Eugene, Oregon	2nd	10000 m	31:41.56

=== NCAA titles ===
- NCAA Division I Women's Outdoor Track and Field Championships
  - 5000 meters: 2023
  - 5000 meters: 2024 (CR)
  - 10000 meters: 2024 (MR)
- NCAA Division I Women's Indoor Track and Field Championships
  - 3000 meters: 2024
  - 5000 meters: 2024
- NCAA Women's Division I Cross Country Championship
  - 6 km XC: 2023
