= Ryan Shay =

American long-distance runner

Personal information
- Nationality: American
- Born: May 4, 1979 Ypsilanti, Michigan, USA
- Died: November 3, 2007 (aged 28) New York City, USA
- Height: 5 ft 10 in (1.78 m)
- Weight: 155 lb (70 kg)

Sport
- Sport: Track, Long-distance running
- Event(s): 5000 meters, 10,000 meters, Marathon
- College team: Notre Dame

Achievements and titles
- Highest world ranking: No. 9
- Personal best(s): 5000m: 13:35.08; 10,000m: 28:03.44; Marathon: 2:14:08
- Updated on 27-11-2008

Ryan Shay (May 4, 1979 – November 3, 2007) was an American professional long-distance runner who won several USA championships titles. He was born in Ypsilanti, Michigan, and attended the University of Notre Dame. He was married to Alicia Craig, also an American distance runner.

== Running career ==
=== High school ===
Ryan Shay attended Central Lake High School in Central Lake, Michigan, home of the Trojans, from 1993 to 1997. He won every cross country meet he competed following the third meet of his freshman year (1993), including four consecutive Class-D MHSAA Lower Peninsula (LP) state cross country meets from 1993 to 1996. He was a three-time consecutive Class D MHSAA LP state champion in the 1600-meter and 3200-meter runs from his sophomore through senior track seasons (1995 through 1997), and also won the Class-D MHSAA LP state title in the 800-meter run as a sophomore. He was also his class valedictorian.

=== Collegiate ===
Shay continued running as a student-athlete at the University of Notre Dame in the fall of 1997, majoring in economics and competing in both cross country and track. He was a 9-time All-American while competing at Notre Dame. Shay was the first Notre Dame runner to win an NCAA individual title, winning the 10,000-meter run at the 2001 NCAA outdoor meet in a time of 29:05.44. Shay graduated as the school record holder in both the indoor and outdoor 5,000-meter runs, as well as the 10,000-meter run. He graduated in the top of his class.

=== Post-collegiate/professional ===
Following college, Shay ran professionally, winning races at various distances, including marathon, half-marathon, 20 km and 15 km. Shay also competed during the 2005 IAAF World Half Marathon Championships, finishing 15th in the men's individual race. Shay finished in 23rd place in the 2004 Men's Olympic Marathon Trials.

=== USA Running Circuit ===
Shay was a five-time road national champion in the 15 km, 20 km, marathon and twice in the half marathon. In 2003 after winning both the USA Half Marathon Championships and the USA Marathon Championships as well as placing third in the USA 25 km Championships and the USA 5 km Championships Shay was named the 2003 USA Running Circuit Champion. Shay repeated as the USA Running Circuit Champion in 2004 after winning both the USA Half Marathon Championships and the USA 20 km Championships as well as finishing second in the USA 25 km Championships and USA 5 km Championships and placing third at the USA 10 Mile Championships. In 2005 Shay came in second place in the USA Running Circuit Championships standings, third in 2006 and 10th in 2007.

== Death ==
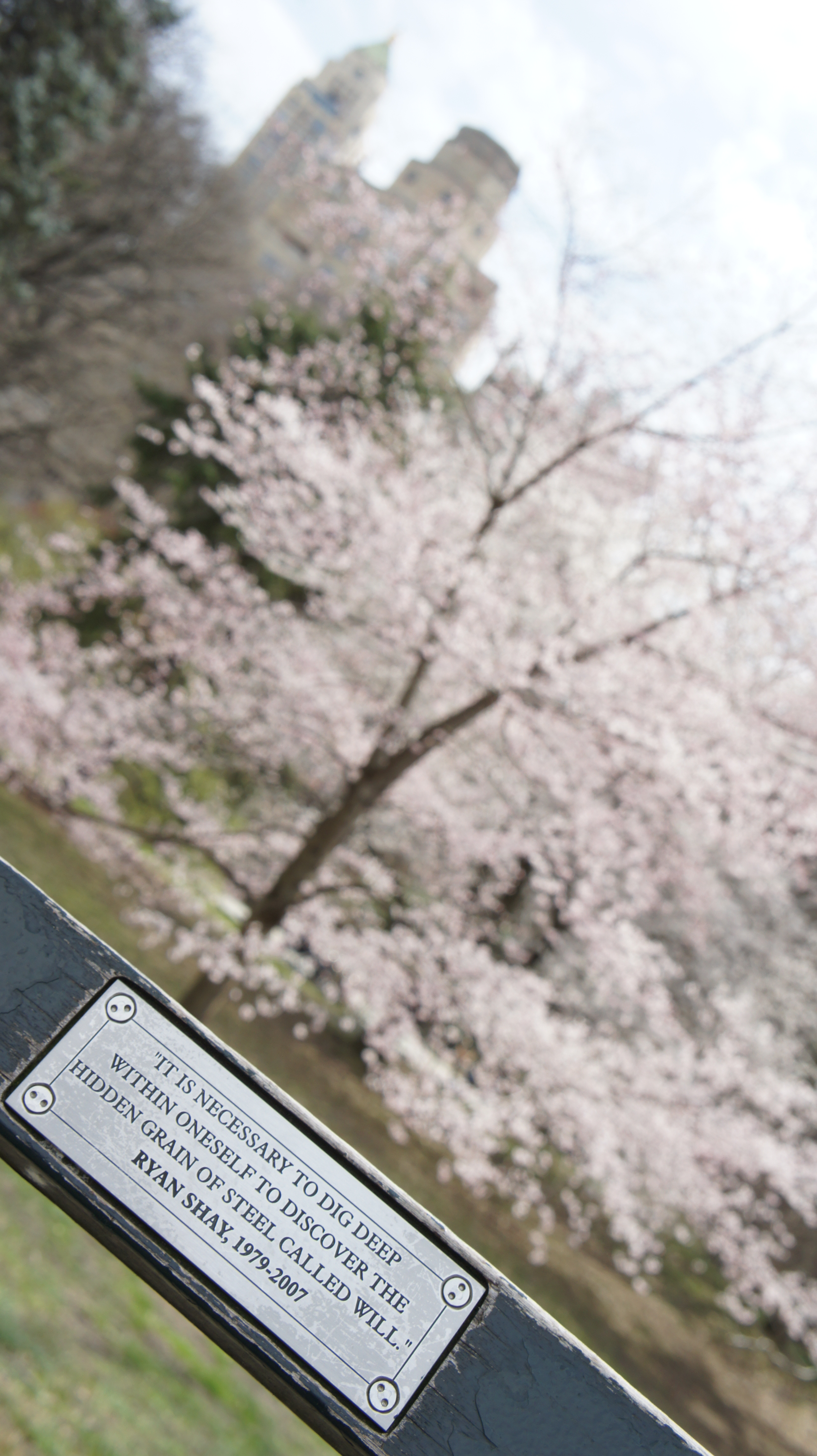
Memorial plate on a bench in Central Park

On November 3, 2007, during the US Olympic marathon trials in New York City, Shay collapsed approximately 5 1/2 miles (8.9 km) into the race at 8:06 a.m. He was taken to Lenox Hill Hospital, where he was pronounced dead at 8:46 a.m. Doctors at the hospital who examined him reported that he died of heart failure due to cardiac arrhythmia, due to a pre-existing enlarged heart condition. Autopsy results were initially inconclusive, leading to speculation over other possibilities for his death. On March 18, 2008, Ellen Borakove, the Director of Public Affairs of the New York Chief Medical Examiner's Office released the following statement to Joe Shay, Ryan's father, regarding his final autopsy results: "Cardiac arrhythmia due to cardiac hypertrophy with patchy fibrosis of undetermined etiology. Natural causes."

== Achievements ==
- 2005 USATF 15 km Champion
- 2004 USATF 20 km Champion
- 2004 USATF Half-Marathon Champion
- 2003 USATF Half-Marathon Champion
- 2003 USATF Marathon Champion
- 2001 NCAA Outdoor Track & Field Champion (10000-meter run)
- 2001 Big East Conference Outdoor Track & Field Champion (10000-meter run)
- 2001 Big East Conference Indoor Track & Field Champion (5000-meter run)
- 2000 Big East Conference Outdoor Track & Field Champion (5000-meter & 10000-meter runs)
- 1999 Big East Conference Cross Country Champion
- 1999 Big East Conference Indoor Track & Field Champion (3000-meter run)

== Competition record ==
=== International competitions ===
Year	Competition	Venue	Position	Event	Notes
2004	North American Men's Marathon Relay Championships	Akron, United States	2nd	Marathon relay	2:05:39

=== USA National Championships ===
==== Road ====
Year	Competition	Venue	Position	Event	Notes
2003	USA Marathon Championships	Birmingham, Alabama	1st	marathon	2:14:29
2003	USA 15 km Championships	Jacksonville, Florida	8th	15 km	45:22
2003	USA 8 km Championships	New York City, New York	15th	8 km	23:13
2003	USA 25 km Championships	Grand Rapids, Michigan	3rd	25 km	1:17:44
2003	USA Half Marathon Championships	Kansas City, Missouri	1st	half marathon	1:04:13
2003	USA 5 km Championships	Providence, Rhode Island	3rd	5 km	14:06
2004	US Olympic Trials	Birmingham, Alabama	22nd	marathon	2:19:20
2004	USA 10 mi. Championships	Louisville, Kentucky	3rd	10 mi.	47:11
2004	USA 25 km Championships	Grand Rapids, Michigan	2nd	25 km	1:17:12
2004	USA Half Marathon Championships	Kansas City, Missouri	1st	half marathon	1:05:04
2004	USA 20 km Championships	New Haven, Connecticut	1st	20 km	59:53
2004	USA 5 km Championships	Providence, Rhode Island	2nd	5 km	14:02
2005	USA 15 km Championships	Jacksonville, Florida	1st	15 km	43:52
2005	USA 8 km Championships	New York City, New York	4th	8 km	23:05
2005	USA 20 km Championships	New Haven, Connecticut	2nd	20 km	1:00:33
2005	USA 5 km Championships	Providence, Rhode Island	3rd	5 km	13:59
2006	USA 15 km Championships	Jacksonville, Florida	6th	15 km	44:42
2006	USA 25 km Championships	Grand Rapids, Michigan	13th	25 km	1:19:13
2006	USA 20 km Championships	New Haven, Connecticut	8th	20 km	1:00:48
2006	USA 5 km Championships	Providence, Rhode Island	3rd	5 km	13:58.2
2007	USA Half Marathon Championships	Houston, Texas	15th	half marathon	1:04:23
2007	USA 15 km Championships	Jacksonville, Florida	9th	15 km	45:13
2007	USA 25 km Championships	Grand Rapids, Michigan	3rd	25 km	1:17:22
2007	USA 20 km Championships	New Haven, Connecticut	5th	20 km	1:01:21

==== Track and field ====
Year	Competition	Venue	Position	Event	Notes
2002	USA Outdoor Track and Field Championships	Palo Alto, California	7th	10,000 m	28:40.66
2007	USA Outdoor Track and Field Championships	Indianapolis, Indiana	8th	10,000 m	28:54.34

==== Cross country ====
Year	Competition	Venue	Position	Event	Notes
2007	USA Cross Country Championships	Boulder, Colorado	14th	Senior race	38:46

=== NCAA championships ===
==== Track and field ====
Year	Competition	Venue	Position	Event	Notes
Representing Notre Dame
1999	NCAA Outdoor Track and Field Championships	Boise, Idaho	7th	10,000 m	29:55.78
2000	NCAA Outdoor Track and Field Championships	Durham, North Carolina	7th	10,000 m	30:54.65
2001	NCAA Outdoor Track and Field Championships	Eugene, Oregon	6th	5000 m	13:52.45
2001	NCAA Outdoor Track and Field Championships	Eugene, Oregon	1st	10,000 m	29:05:44

==== Cross country ====
Year	Competition	Venue	Position	Notes
Representing Notre Dame
1997	NCAA Cross Country Championships	Greenville, South Carolina	68th	30:58
1998	NCAA Cross Country Championships	Lawrence, Kansas	229th	34:16
1999	NCAA Cross Country Championships	Bloomington, Indiana	12th	30:46.10
2001	NCAA Cross Country Championships	Greenville, South Carolina	6th	29:23
