= USA Half Marathon Championships =

Road running event

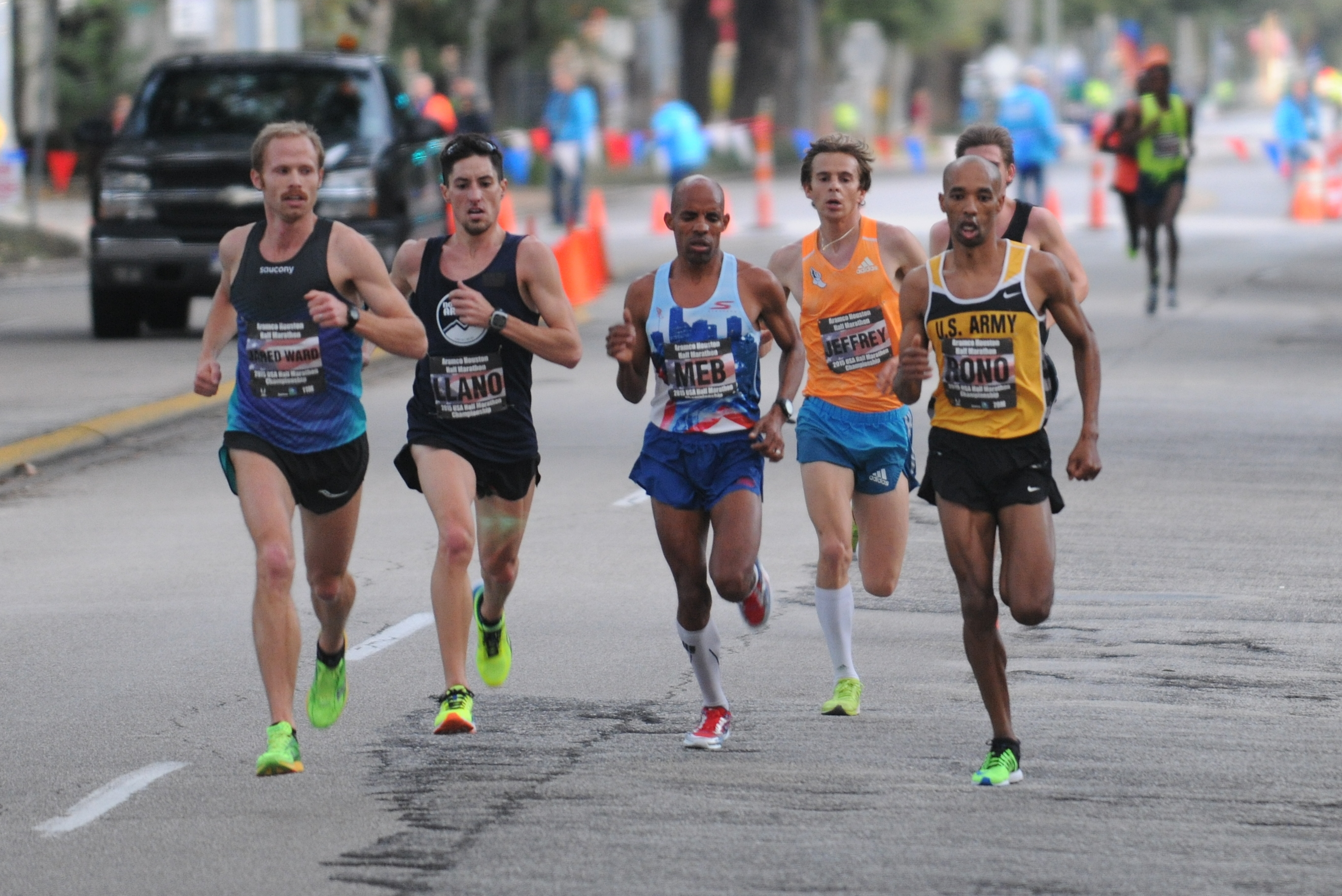
- Contestants at the 2015 Championships
- Location: United States
- Event type: Road
- Distance: Half marathon
- Established: Men's race 1987; Women's race 1989

The USA Half Marathon Championships is the annual national championships for half marathon running in the United States. The race serves as a way of designating the American national champion for the half marathon. The men's race was first contested in 1987 and the women's race began in 1989.

== Men's results ==
New championship record

Year	Location	Venue	Winner	Time
2026	Atlanta, Georgia	Atlanta Half Marathon	Wesley Kiptoo	1:01:15
2025	Atlanta, GA	Atlanta Half Marathon	Alex Maier	1:00:48
2023	Fort Worth, TX	The Cowtown Marathon	Jacob Thomson	1:02:38
2022	Indianapolis, Indiana	500 Festival Mini-Marathon	Leonard Korir (3)	1:02:35
2021	Hardeeville, South Carolina	Mortgage Network Half Marathon	Conner Mantz	1:00:55
2020	Cancelled due to COVID-19 Pandemic			
2019	Pittsburgh, Pennsylvania	UPMC Health Plan Pittsburgh Half Marathon	Leonard Korir (2)	1:01:52
2018	Pittsburgh, Pennsylvania	UPMC Health Plan Pittsburgh Half Marathon	Chris Derrick	1:02:37
2017	Columbus, Ohio	Capital City Half Marathon	Leonard Korir	1:03:04
2016	Columbus, Ohio	Capital City Half Marathon	Christo Landry	1:02:52
2015	Houston, Texas	Aramco Houston Half Marathon	Diego Estrada	1:00:51
2014	Houston, Texas	Aramco Houston Half Marathon	Meb Keflezighi (2)	1:01:23
2013	Duluth, Minnesota	Grandma's Marathon	Mo Trafeh (2)	1:01:17
2012	Duluth, Minnesota	Grandma's Marathon	Abdi Abdirahman	1:02:46
2011	Houston, Texas	Aramco Houston Half Marathon	Mo Trafeh	1:02:17
2010	Houston, Texas	Aramco Houston Half Marathon	Antonia Vega	1:01:54
2009	Houston, Texas	Aramco Half Marathon	Meb Keflezighi	1:01:25
2008	Houston, Texas	Aramco Houston Half Marathon	James Carney	1:02:21
2007	Houston, Texas	Aramco Houston Half Marathon	Ryan Hall	59:43
2006	Houston, Texas	Aramco Houston Half Marathon	Brian Sell	1:02:39
2005	Houston, Texas	Aramco Houston Half Marathon	Dan Browne (2)	1:03:56
2004	Kansas City, Missouri	Carondelet Heart Institute Hospital Hill Run	Ryan Shay (2)	1:05:04
2003	Kansas City, Missouri	Carondelet Heart Institute Hospital Hill Run	Ryan Shay	1:04:13
2002	Kansas City, Missouri	UMKC Hospital Hill Run	Peter De la Cerda	1:05:57
2001	Parkersburg, West Virginia	—	Dan Browne	1:03:55
2000	Parkersburg, West Virginia	—	Rod DeHaven (3)	1:03:06
1999	Parkersburg, West Virginia	—	Todd Williams	1:04:24
1998	Parkersburg, West Virginia	—	Rod DeHaven (2)	1:03:42
1997	Parkersburg, West Virginia	—	David Morris	1:05:53
1996	Parkersburg, West Virginia	—	Alfredo Vigueras	1:04:42
1995	Parkersburg, West Virginia	—	Steve Spence	1:04:42
1994	Parkersburg, West Virginia	—	Rod DeHaven	1:03:38
1993	Parkersburg, West Virginia	—	Ed Eyestone	1:03:19
1992	Parkersburg, West Virginia	—	Don Janicki	1:03:44
1991	Parkersburg, West Virginia	—	Jon Sinclair	1:03:44
1990	Parkersburg, West Virginia	—	Mark Curp	1:03:37
1989	—	—	—	—
1988	Orlando, Florida	Citrus Bowl Half Marathon	Mark Stickley	1:02:42
1987	Boston, Massachusetts	New Bedford/Bank of Boston Half Marathon	Paul Cummings	1:02:32

== Women's results ==
New championship record

Year	Location	Venue	Winner	Time
2026	Atlanta, GA	Atlanta Half Marathon	Molly Born	1:09:43
2025	Atlanta, GA	Atlanta Half Marathon	Taylor Roe	1:07:22
2023	Fort Worth, TX	The Cowtown Marathon	Aliphine Tuliamuk (2)	1:09:36
2022	Indianapolis, Indiana	500 Festival Mini-Marathon	Emily Sisson	1:07:11
2021	Hardeeville, South Carolina	Mortgage Network Half Marathon	Keira D'Amato	1:07:55
2020	Cancelled due to COVID-19 Pandemic			
2019	Pittsburgh, Pennsylvania	UPMC Health Plan Pittsburgh Half Marathon	Stephanie Bruce	1:10:43
2018	Pittsburgh, Pennsylvania	UPMC Health Plan Pittsburgh Half Marathon	Aliphine Tuliamuk	1:10:04
2017	Columbus, Ohio	Capital City Half Marathon	Natosha Rogers	1:10:45
2016	Columbus, Ohio	Capital City Half Marathon	Tara Welling	1:10:25
2015	Houston, Texas	Aramco Houston Half Marathon	Kim Conley	1:09:44
2014	Houston, Texas	Aramco Houston Half Marathon	Serena Burla	1:10:48
2013	Duluth, Minnesota	Grandma's Marathon	Adriana Nelson	1:11:19
2012	Duluth, Minnesota	Grandma's Marathon	Kara Goucher	1:09:46
2011	Houston, Texas	Aramco Houston Half Marathon	Jennifer Rhines	1:11:14
2010	Houston, Texas	Aramco Houston Half Marathon	Shalane Flanagan	1:09:41
2009	Houston, Texas	Aramco Houston Half Marathon	Magdalena Lewy Boulet	1:11:47
2008	Houston, Texas	Aramco Houston Half Marathon	Kate O'Neil	1:11:57
2007	Houston, Texas	Aramco Houston Half Marathon	Elva Dryer	1:11:42
2006	Kansas City, Missouri	Hospital Hill Half Marathon	Annie Bersagel	1:14:36
2005	—	—	—	—
2004	Duluth, Minnesota	Grandma's Marathon	Deena Kastor	1:10:30
2003	Duluth, Minnesota	Grandma's Marathon	Colleen De Reuck	1:10:00
2002	—	—	—	—
2001	Parkersburg, West Virginia	—	Milena Glusac	1:12:13
2000	Parkersburg, West Virginia	—	Libbie Hickman (2)	1:11:01
1999	Parkersburg, West Virginia	—	Gwyn Coogan	1:12:36
1998	Parkersburg, West Virginia	—	Libbie Hickman	1:13:29
1997	—	—	—	—
1996	Schaumburg, Illinois	Motorola Half Marathon	Anne Marie Lauck	1:12:10
1995	—	—	—	—
1994	—	—	—	—
1993	Fairfield, Connecticut	—	Elaine Van Blunk	1:12:06
1992	—	—	—	—
1991	—	—	—	—
1990	—	—	—	—
1989	Fairfield, Connecticut	—	Diane Brewer	1:13:00

== Records ==
Men's USA Marathon Championships event record
Year	Location	Venue	Runner	Time
2007	Houston, Texas	Aramco Houston Half Marathon	Ryan Hall	59:43

Women's USA Half Marathon Championships event record
Year	Location	Venue	Runner	Time
2022	Indianapolis, IN	500 Festival Mini-Marathon	Emily Sisson	1:07:11

== 2025 Atlanta Half Marathon ==
In October 2024, USATF announced the 2025 USA Half Marathon Championships would be held March 2nd at the Atlanta Half Marathon. The event was part of the Atlanta Marathon weekend, put on by the Atlanta Track Club. The top 3 finishers will each be selected to represent Team USA in the half marathon distance at the World Athletics Road Running Championships in San Diego on September 28th. Alex Maier won the men's race in 1:00:48, while Taylor Roe won the women's race in 1:07:22. Both were Puma sponsored runners based out of North Carolina. Shadrack Kipchirchir and Hillary Bor placed 2nd and 3rd for the men, while Emma Grace Hurley and Amanda Vestri rounded out the women's team.

== See also ==
- USA Marathon Championships
- USA Cross Country Championships
- USA Outdoor Track and Field Championships
- USA Indoor Track and Field Championships
