= Sarah Calvert =

British middle-distance runner (born 2001)

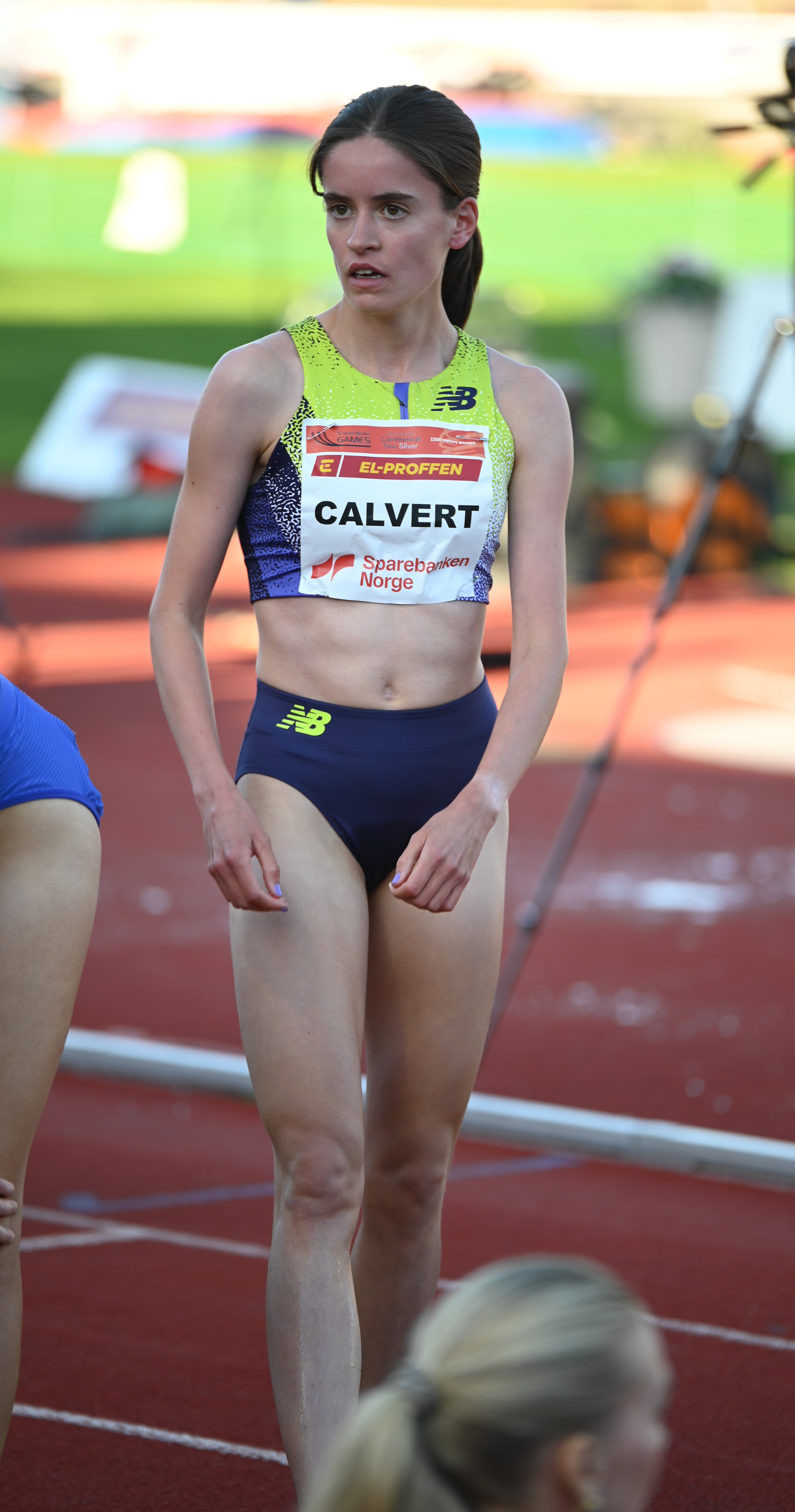
- Calvert in 2026

Personal information
- Nationality: British (Scottish)
- Born: 29 June 2001 (age 25)

Sport
- Sport: Athletics
- Event: Middle-distance running,
- Club: Livingston; Edinburgh Univ

Achievements and titles
- Personal bests: 800m: 2:00.00 (London, 2025); 1500m: 4:02.25 (Twickenham, 2026); Mile: 4:27.30 (Stirling, 2025); 3000m: 9:17.06 (Glasgow, 2023); 5km (road): 16:23 (Newcastle, 2025)
Medal record
Women's athletics
Representing Great Britain
Summer World University Games
Silver medal – second place	2025 Bochum	1500 m

Sarah Calvert (born 29 June 2001) is a British middle-distance runner from Scotland. She won the 1500 metres titles at the 2025 and 2026 UK Athletics Championships.

== Early and personal life ==
Calvert attended Linlithgow Academy in West Lothian. She underwent an operation for the back condition scoliosis when she was 15 years-old and could not compete for a year. She won the Scottish Schools Championships at under-20 level over both 800 metres and 1500 metres in both 2018 and 2019. Her younger sister Isla is also a middle-distance runner. She later combined running with studying medicine at Edinburgh University.

== Career ==
A member of Livingston AC, she was coached in her early career by Sandra Hardacre and later by Luke Gunn.

She finished seventh over 800 metres in a personal best time of 2:05.68 at the 2019 European Athletics U20 Championships in Borås, Sweden.

She won the Scottish Athletics 3000 metres championships in June 2023. That month, she won the British U23 title over 1500 metres ahead of Alexandra Millard. She competed at the 2023 European Athletics U23 Championships in July 2023 in Espoo, Finland. She won Scottish titles over 800 metres and 1500 metres in August 2023, that month she set a new Scottish Native Record - the fastest time by a Scot in Scotland - for the women's mile run at the Monument Mile Classic event in Stirling, breaking the record set by Yvonne Murray in 1985.

Calvert was announced in the initial intake of Stride Athletics "The Athlete Springboard" at the start of 2025. She then became Scottish Indoor 3000 metres champion in January 2025 with a personal best time of 9:15.67. In May 2025, she won the British Universities and Colleges Sport (BUCS) outdoor title over 1500 metres. In June 2025, she lowered her personal best for the 800 metres whilst competing in Austria, running a time of 2:00.32. She was named in the British team for the 2025 Summer World University Games in Germany, where she won the silver medal in the women's 1500 metres.

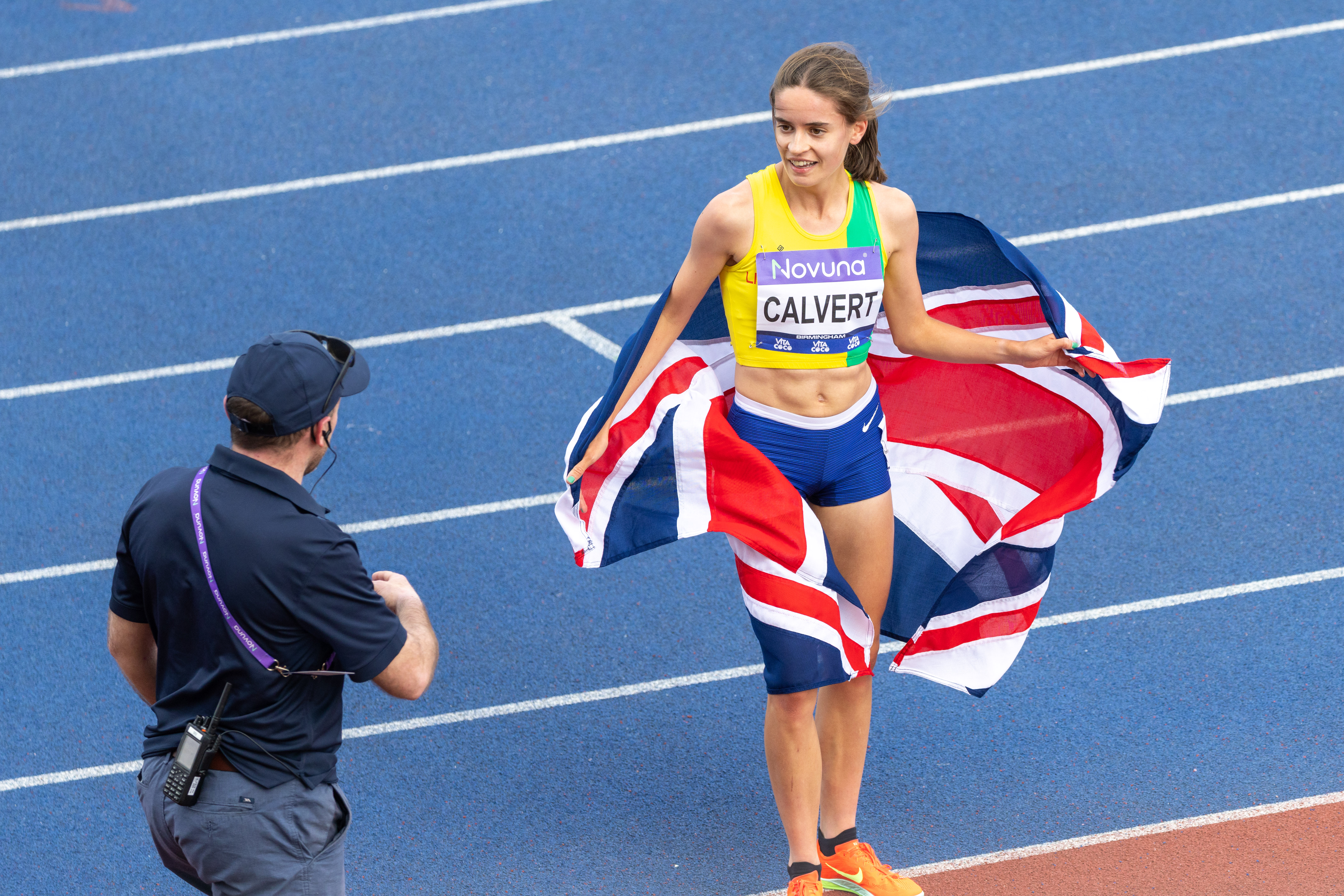
Calvert (right) after her first UK 1500m title win in 2025

On 3 August, she became the British 1500 metres champion, after she won the event at the 2025 UK Athletics Championships in Birmingham in 4:16.27 finishing ahead of Laura Muir. A surprise victory, the win was described as "unbelievable, the story of the weekend, a fairytale" during the BBC Sport live commentary. On 9 August 2025, she lowered her personal best for the 1500 metres to 4:04.33 as she finished fourth at the World Athletics Continental Tour bronze meeting in Oordegem, Belgium. Also in August, she placed third at the Monument Mile in Stirling.

On 24 January 2026, she ran 1500 metres in an indoor personal best of 4:12.16 at the New Balance Indoor Grand Prix in Boston. In May, she won the 800m in 2:01.90 at The Belfast Classic. That month, she also won over 1500 m in Rehlingen, Germany ahead of Ethiopia's Samrawit Mulugeta and fellow Scot Jemma Reekie before placing second in the 1500 metres at the Trond Mohn Games in Bergen, behind Adele Gay of France. In June, she retained her national title in the final of the 1500 metres at the 2026 UK Championships, pulling clear in a sprint finish to run 4:07.82.

Calvert was named in the Scottish team for the 2026 Commonwealth Games in Glasgow, qualifying for the final of the mile run and placing seventh overall. On 9 August, she improved her personal best time for the 1500 m to 4:02:25 at the British Milers Club Grand Prix at St Mary's University, Twickenham. She wore her first Great Britain senior vest at the 2026 World Athletics Road Running Championships on 19 September, placing 27th overall in the mile run.

== Athletic Achievements ==
=== Personal bests ===
Type	Distance	Time (s)	Venue	Date	Notes
Individual events
Indoor	800 metres sh	2:12.42	Glasgow, United Kingdom	8 February 2018	
Indoor	1500 metres sh	4:12.16	Boston, United States	24 January 2026	
Indoor	Mile sh	4:38.05	Boston, United States	30 January 2026	
Outdoor	800 metres	2:00.00	London, United Kingdom	20 August 2025	
Outdoor	1500 metres	4:02.25	Twickenham, England	9 August 2026	
Outdoor	Mile	4:27.30	Stirling, United Kingdom	30 August 2025	
Outdoor	3000 metres	9:17.06	Glasgow, United Kingdom	2 June 2023	
Outdoor	5000 metres	16:39.17	Manchester, United Kingdom	23 July 2022	
Outdoor	5 kilometres road	16:23	Newcastle upon Tyne, United Kingdom	31 December 2025	
Team events
Outdoor	4x800 metres relay	8:57.97	Birmingham, United Kingdom	3 August 2019	

=== International competitions ===
Representing Great Britain & Scotland
Year	Competition	Venue	Position	Event	Time	Notes
2019	European U20 Championships	Borås, Sweden	7th	800 m	2:05.68	PB
2023	European U23 Championships	Espoo, Finland	10th	1500 m	4:15.03	
2025	World University Games	Bochum, Germany	2nd	1500 m	4:20.18	
2026	Commonwealth Games	Glasgow, United Kingdom	7th	Mile	4:40.90	
2026	World Road Running Championships	Copenhagen, Denmark	27th	Road mile	4:40.98	

=== National championships and competitions ===
Year	Competition	Venue	Position	Event	Time	Notes
2017	Scottish Indoor Championships, U17 events	Glasgow	1st	1500 m	4:48.39	
2017	Scottish Championships, U20 events	Glasgow	3rd	800 m	2:13.44	
2017	Scottish Championships, U20 events	Glasgow	2nd	1500 m	4:55.95	
2018	Scottish Indoor Championships	Glasgow	3rd	1500 m	4:34.72	
2018	England Championships, U20 events	Bedford	—	800 m	2:12.88	
2019	Scottish Indoor Championships, U20 events	Glasgow	1st	1500 m	4:35.78	
2019	England Championships, U20 events	Bedford	3rd	800 m	2:05.83	
2019	Scottish Championships, U20 events	Grangemouth	1st	800 m	2:07.86	
2019	Scottish Championships, U20 events	Grangemouth	1st	1500 m	4:29.00	
2019	Scottish Championships	Grangemouth	1st	800 m	2:08.37	
2019	British Championships	Birmingham	—	800 m	2:06.17	
2021	Scottish Championships	Grangemouth	1st	1500 m	4:14.59	
2023	Scottish Championships	Glasgow	1st	800 m	2:06.42	
2023	Scottish Championships	Glasgow	1st	1500 m	4:22.62	
2023	Scottish Championships	Glasgow	1st	3000 m	9:17.06	
2023	England Championships, U23 events	Chelmsford	1st	1500 m	4:20.99	
2024	British Championships	Manchester	8th	4:15.58		
2024	Scottish Championships	Grangemouth	1st	800 m	2:07.15	
2024	Scottish Championships	Grangemouth	1st	1500 m	4:24.00	
2025	Scottish Indoor Championships	Glasgow	5th	3000 m	9:15.67	
2025	British Championships	Birmingham	1st	1500 m	4:16.27	
2026	British Championships	Birmingham	1st	1500 m	4:07.82	
