= Joceline Wind =

Swiss middle-distance runner

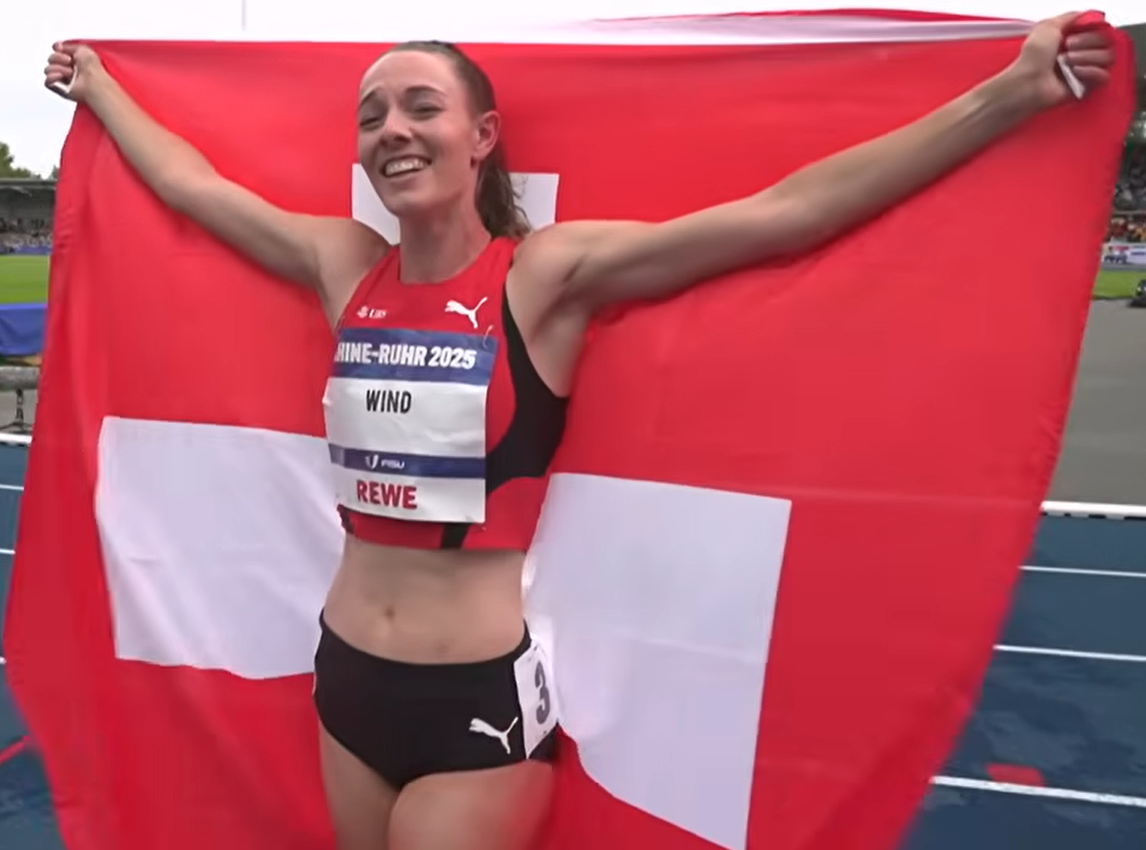
- At the 2025 World University Games

Personal information
- Nationality: Swiss
- Born: 12 September 2000 (age 26)

Sport
- Sport: Athletics
- Event: Middle distance

Achievements and titles
- Personal bests: 800 m: 1:59.87 (Lausanne 2026); 1500 m: 3:59.79 (Bellinzona 2026)
Medal record
World University Games
Gold medal – first place	2025 Bochum	1500 m

Joceline Wind (born 12 September 2000) is a Swiss middle-distance runner. She is a four-time national Swiss champion in the 1500 metres.

== Career ==
Wind competed at the 2021 European Athletics U23 Championships, where she made the finals in the 1500 metres, ultimately placing 10th. At the 2023 European Athletics Indoor Championships, she placed 6th in the 1500 metres final.

Wind was selected to compete in the 2023 World Athletics Championships. Running the 1500 metres event, she did not progress past the heats. At the 2024 European Athletics Championships, Wind competed in the 1500 metres.

During the 2025 indoor season, Wind placed 8th in the 1500 metres at the European Indoor Championships. She then competed at the 2025 World Athletics Indoor Championships.

In the 2026 season, Wind competed internationally at the 2026 World Athletics Indoor Championships and the 2026 World Athletics Road Running Championships, placing 23rd in the mile at the latter competition. She also ran sub-4 minutes in the 1500 metres for the first time in her career with a new personal best of 3:59.79 in August.
