= Heather MacLean (runner) =

American middle-distance runner (born 1995)

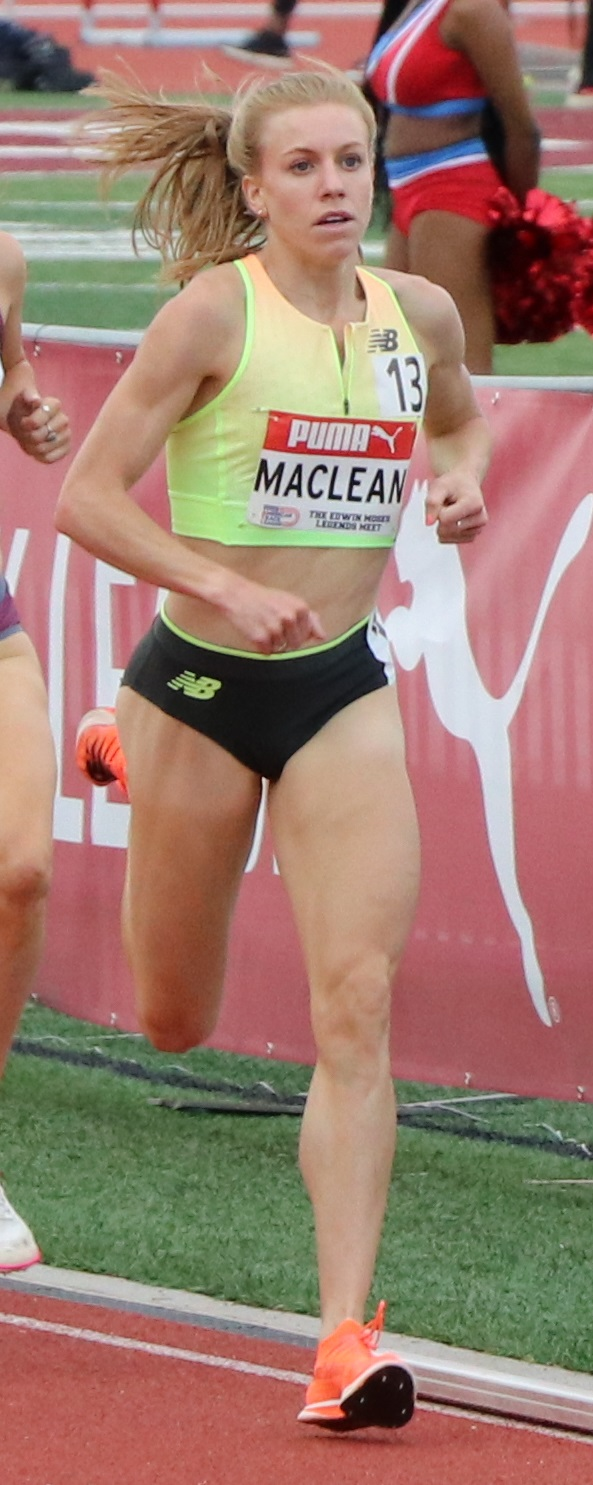

Personal information
- National team: United States
- Born: August 31, 1995 (age 31) Peabody, Massachusetts, U.S.
- Education: University of Massachusetts Amherst '17 '19; Peabody Veterans Memorial High School '13
- Height: 5 ft 6 in (168 cm)

Sport
- Sport: Athletics
- Events: 800 m 1000 m 1500 m
- College team: UMass Amherst
- Turned pro: 2018
- Coached by: Juli Benson

Heather MacLean (born August 31, 1995) is an American middle-distance runner.

From Peabody, Massachusetts and an alumna of the University of Massachusetts Amherst, MacLean is based in Boston.

== NCAA ==
In college at the University of Massachusetts, MacLean was a three time NCAA Division I All-American and a finalist for the 2018 NCAA Woman of the Year award.

As a junior in 2016 she placed 9th in the 2016 NCAA Division I Indoor Track and Field Championships mile. In the fall of 2017, she earned NCAA Division I All-American cross country honors at the NCAA Division I Cross Country Championships (the school's first woman to do so). Later in that same school year, MacLean placed 10th in the preliminary heats of the 800m at the 2018 NCAA Division I Outdoor Track and Field Championships, earning her third All-American nod.

By the time of her graduation she had established school records indoors in the 800m, 1000m, mile, 3000m, 4x400, 4x800, and distance medley, and outdoor records in the 800m, 1500m, and mile.

== Professional ==
In 2018, MacLean began to be coached by Mark Coogan for Team New Balance Boston.

In 2019, she placed seventh in the USA Outdoor Championships 1500m, setting a personal best of 4:05.27. In the 2020 NYRR Wanamaker Mile, she finished sixth, clocking a personal best of 4:25.98, which placed her 15th on the U.S. women's all-time indoor list.

MacLean won the Blankenship Women's Mile in 4:27.54 at the 2021 American Track League meet number 2 in Fayetteville, and also the 1500 meters in 4:06.32 at the New Balance Indoor Grand Prix in New York. At the delayed 2020 U.S. Olympic trials held in Eugene, Oregon, on June 21, 2021, she finished third in the women's 1500 m race (4:02.09), behind Elle Purrier St. Pierre and Cory McGee, to secure a place at the 2020 Summer Olympics in Tokyo. At the Games, MacLean was eliminated in the semi-finals with a time of 4:05.33.

In February 2023 at the New Balance Indoor Grand Prix in Boston, racing in the women's mile, MacLean edged out Canadian Lucia Stafford to win with a world-leading and personal best time of 4:23.42.

She ran a personal best 3:58.41 over 1500 metres at the US Olympic trials in June 2024. She won the New Balance Indoor Grand Prix 1500 metres in February 2025, with a personal best 4:23.32. Later that month, she was runner-up to Georgia Bell in the Wanamaker Mile at the Millrose Games in New York City. She finished third over 1500 metres at the 2025 USA Indoor Track and Field Championships. She ran 4:17.01 for the mile on 2 March 2025 in Boston, to move to fourth on the women's world indoor mile all-time list. She was selected for the 2025 World Athletics Indoor Championships in Nanjing in March 2025.

In June 2025, MacLean announced she would no longer be coached by Mark Coogan and train with New Balance Boston, but would now be coached by Juli Benson while still being based out of Boston. She finished fourth in the 1500 metres at the Diamond League event at the 2025 Golden Gala in Rome on 6 June 2025. She ran 4:05.60 for the 1500 metres at the 2025 USA Outdoor Track and Field Championships to place fourth overall in the final. She set a new personal best at the 2025 Kamila Skolimowska Memorial, in Poland, with a run of 3:57.79 for the 1500 metres. She placed fifth in the 1500 metres at the Diamond League Final in Zurich on 28 August.

In February 2026, she ran an indoors personal best for the 800 metres with 1:59.59 in Boston. MacLean was a finalist in the 800 metres at the 2026 USA Indoor Track and Field Championships in New York, placing fifth overall.

== Statistics ==
=== Circuit performances ===
Grand Slam Track results
Slam	Race group	Event	Pl.	Time	Prize money
2025 Kingston Slam	Short distance	800 m	7th	2:00.71	US$15,000
2025 Kingston Slam	Short distance	1500 m	5th	4:07.11	US$15,000

=== International competitions ===
Representing the United States
Year	Competition	Venue	Position	Event	Time
2021	Olympic Games	Tokyo, Japan	21st	1500m	4:05.33
2022	World Athletics Indoor Championships	Belgrade, Serbia	7th	1500m	4:06.38
2022	NACAC Championships	Freeport, The Bahamas	1st	1500m	4:04.53 CR
2025	World Athletics Indoor Championships	Nanjing, China	7th	1500m	4:05.45

=== National championships ===
Year	Competition	Venue	Position	Event	Time
2018	USATF Outdoor Championships	Des Moines, Iowa	27th	800m	2:06.14
2019	USATF Indoor Championships	Staten Island, New York	11th	1000m	2:42.67 PB
2019	USATF Outdoor Championships	Des Moines, Iowa	7th	1500m	4:05.27 PB
2020	USATF Indoor Championships	Albuquerque, New Mexico	7th	1500m	4:15.82
2021	Olympic Trials	Eugene, Oregon	3rd	1500m	4:02.09 PB
2022	USATF Indoor Championships	Spokane, Washington	1st	1500m	4:06.09
2022	USATF Outdoor Championships	Eugene, Oregon	5th	1500m	4:06.40
2023	USATF Outdoor Championships	Eugene, Oregon	7th	1500m	4:05.29
2024	Olympic Trials	Eugene, Oregon	7th	1500m	3:58.31 PB
2025	USATF Indoor Championships	Staten Island, New York	3rd	1500m	4:06.69
2025	USATF Outdoor Championships	Eugene, Oregon	4th	1500m	4:05.60
2026	USATF Indoor Championships	Staten Island, New York	5th	800m	2:03.38
2026	USATF Outdoor Championships	New York City, New York	8th	1500m	4:11.49
2026	USATF Outdoor Championships	New York City, New York	13th	800m	2:02.16

=== Personal bests ===
- 800 metres – 1:58.77 (Concord, MA 2024)
  - 800 metres indoor – 1:59.59 (Boston MA 2026)
- 1500 metres – 3:57.79 (Chorzów 2025)
  - 1500 metres indoor – 3:59.60 (Boston, MA 2025)
- One mile – 4:20.41 (Raleigh, NC 2024)
  - One mile indoor – 4:17.01 (Boston, MA 2025)
