= Athletics at the 2025 Summer World University Games – Women's 1500 metres =

Women's 1500 metres at the 2025 Summer World University Games
- Venue: Lohrheidestadion
- Location: Bochum, Germany
- Dates: 25 July (heats); 27 July (final)
- Competitors: 30 from 22 nations
- Winning time: 4:19.96

Medalists
gold medal	Joceline Wind	Switzerland
silver medal	Sarah Calvert	Great Britain
bronze medal	Kimberley May	New Zealand

The women's 1500 metres event at the 2025 Summer World University Games was held in Bochum, Germany, at Lohrheidestadion on 25 and 27 July.

== Records ==
Prior to the competition, the records were as follows:

Record	Athlete (nation)	Time (s)	Location	Date
Games record	Paula Ivan (ROU)	4:01.32	Zagreb, Yugoslavia	16 July 1987

== Results ==
=== Heats ===
First 6 in each heat (Q) qualified for the final.

==== Heat 1 ====
Place	Athlete	Nation	Time	Notes
1	Kimberley May	New Zealand	4:17.06	Q
2	Amina Maatoug	Netherlands	4:18.30	Q
3	Joceline Wind	Switzerland	4:19.59	Q
4	Laura Nicholson	Ireland	4:20.72	Q
5	Selma Løchen Engdahl	Norway	4:21.21	Q
6	Klara Andrijašević	Croatia	4:21.29	Q
7	Emma Watcke	United States	4:22.35	
8	Stina Pettersson	Sweden	4:25.99	
9	Ty Brockley-Langford	Great Britain	4:26.34	
10	Chloe Coutts	Canada	4:28.01	
11	Loti Rotar	Slovenia	4:34.98	
12	Elīna Gumarova	Latvia	4:42.04	
13	Kajal Kanawade	India	4:50.06	
14	Andrea Jara	Chile	4:55.82	
15	Awa Koné	Mali	4:59.56	PB

==== Heat 2 ====
Place	Athlete	Nation	Time	Notes
1	Sarah Calvert	Great Britain	4:15.48	Q
2	Maggie Liebich	United States	4:16.36	Q
3	Klara Dess	Australia	4:16.40	Q
4	Marina Martínez	Spain	4:16.64	Q
5	Anne Gine Løvnes	Norway	4:16.69	Q
6	Rosa Twyford	New Zealand	4:17.51	Q, PB
7	Gréta Varga	Hungary	4:18.65	SB
8	Tugba Toptas	Turkey	4:19.72	
9	K. M. Chanda	India	4:20.84	
10	Camila Gomes	Portugal	4:25.25	
11	Mireya Bugeja	Malta	4:26.85	PB
12	Lea Haler	Slovenia	4:31.81	
13	Camille Boudreau	Canada	4:35.21	
14	Anete Randma	Estonia	4:37.28	
15	Matilde Ruiz	Chile	4:44.76	

=== Final ===
Place	Athlete	Nation	Time	Notes
1st place, gold medalist(s)	Joceline Wind	Switzerland	4:19.96	
2nd place, silver medalist(s)	Sarah Calvert	Great Britain	4:20.18	
3rd place, bronze medalist(s)	Kimberley May	New Zealand	4:20.39	
4	Marina Martínez	Spain	4:21.26	
5	Klara Dess	Australia	4:21.64	
6	Amina Maatoug	Netherlands	4:21.78	
7	Anne Gine Løvnes	Norway	4:21.80	
8	Laura Nicholson	Ireland	4:22.32	
9	Maggie Liebich	United States	4:22.89	
10	Selma Løchen Engdahl	Norway	4:23.71	
11	Rosa Twyford	New Zealand	4:23.97	
12	Klara Andrijašević	Croatia	4:24.77	
