= 2023 European Athletics U23 Championships – Women's 1500 metres =

Women's 1500 metres at the 2023 European Athletics U23 Championships
- Venue: Leppävaara Stadium
- Location: Espoo, Finland
- Dates: 15 July (heats); 16 July (final)
- Competitors: 20 from 15 nations
- Winning time: 4:07.18

Medalists
gold medal	Sophie O'Sullivan	Ireland
silver medal	Sarah Healy	Ireland
bronze medal	Shannon Flockhart	Great Britain

The women's 1500 metres event at the 2023 European Athletics U23 Championships was held in Espoo, Finland, at Leppävaara Stadium on 15 and 16 July.

== Records ==
Prior to the competition, the records were as follows:

European U23 record	Sifan Hassan (NED)	3:56.05	Monaco, Montecarlo	17 July 2015
Championship U23 record	Amela Terzić (SRB)	4:04.77	Tallinn, Estonia	12 July 2015

== Results ==
=== Heats ===
Qualification rules: First 4 in each heat (Q) qualified for the final.

Rank	Heat	Name	Country	Time	Notes
1	2	Klaudia Kazimierska	Poland	4:16.20	Q
2	2	Sarah Calvert	United Kingdom	4:16.50	Q
3	3	Sarah Healy	Ireland	4:16.58	Q
4	3	Shannon Flockhart	Great Britain	4:17.02	Q
5	2	Amina Maatoug	Netherlands	4:17.27	Q
6	2	Ingeborg Østgård	Norway	4:18.02	Q
7	2	Ilona Mononen	Finland	4:18.06	
8	1	Sophie O'Sullivan	Ireland	4:18.25	Q
9	3	Sarah Peerik	Netherlands	4:18.30	Q
10	1	Alexandra Millard	Great Britain	4:18.81	Q
11	1	Nathalie Blomqvist	Finland	4:18.99	Q
12	1	Wilma Nielsen	Sweden	4:19.25	Q
13	1	Livia Caldarini	Italy	4:19.74	
14	2	Ulyana Rachynska	Ukraine	4:20.70	PB
15	1	Julia Jaguścik	Poland	4:21.41	
16	3	Camila Gomes	Portugal	4:21.82	Q
17	1	Yasmine Abbes	Netherlands	4:22.14	
18	3	Julia Nielsen	Sweden	4:22.86	
19	3	Selma Engdahl	Norway	4:23.18	
20	2	Angela Viciosa	Spain	4:23.18	
21	2	Hana Grobovšek	Slovenia	4:24.10	
22	1	Grethe Tyldum	Norway	4:25.29	
23	1	Lilly Nägeli	Switzerland	4:25.97	
24	2	Klara Andrijašević	Croatia	4:28.10	
25	3	Fabiane Meyer	Germany	4:28.77	
26	3	Antje Pfüller	Switzerland	4:29.67	
27	1	Gabriella Szabó	Hungary	4:31.46	
28	3	Hédi Heffner	Hungary	4:33.75	
29	2	Maria-Talida Sfarghiu	Romania	4:36.51	
30	3	Mireya Arndedillo	Spain	4:38.90	qR

=== Final ===
Rank	Name	Country	Time	Notes
1st place, gold medalist(s)	Sophie O'Sullivan	Ireland	4:07.18	PB
2nd place, silver medalist(s)	Sarah Healy	Ireland	4:07.36	
3rd place, bronze medalist(s)	Shannon Flockhart	Great Britain	4:08.37	PB
4	Klaudia Kazimierska	Poland	4:10.71	
5	Nathalie Blomqvist	Finland	4:10.74	
6	Alexandra Millard	Great Britain	4:11.67	PB
7	Amina Maatoug	Netherlands	4:11.88	PB
8	Wilma Nielsen	Sweden	4:12.15	PB
9	Mireya Arnedillo	Spain	4:14.72	
10	Sarah Calvert	Great Britain	4:15.03	
11	Sarah Peerik	Netherlands	4:15.04	PB
12	Ingeborg Østgård	Norway	4:16.83	
13	Camila Gomes	Portugal	4:16.89	
