= Mark Coogan =

American athletic coach

Personal information
- Born: May 1, 1966 (age 60) Manhasset, New York, United States

Sport
- Sport: Track and field
Medal record
Men's Athletics
Representing the United States
Pan American Games
Silver medal – second place	1995 Mar del Plata	Marathon

Mark J. Coogan (born May 1, 1966) is an American coach and retired American track athlete, who competed in several Olympics.

== Running career ==
He attended Bishop Feehan High School in Attleboro, Massachusetts, and the University of Maryland, College Park.

Coogan was coached at the University of Maryland by Charles Florence Torpey, who headed the Men's and Women's running teams at La Salle University until his untimely death. While in college, Coogan specialized in the steeplechase. Coogan was the first Massachusetts native to run the mile in under four minutes. In March 1995, at the Pan-American Games (Mar del Plata, Argentina), Coogan earned the silver medal in the Marathon, in a time of 2:15:21.

In 1996, Coogan and his wife, Gwynn Coogan, also a competitive runner, were the first married couple to compete in the U.S. Olympic marathon trials in the same year. Mark Coogan finished in second place with a time of 2:13:05, his lifetime best, while Gwyn finished fourth, which placed her as an alternate for the Games.

He subsequently ran the marathon at the 1996 Summer Olympics in Atlanta, placing 41st with a time of 2:20:27. In September of that year Mark and Gwyn would go on to be the first married couple to win the challenging Virginia 10 Miler in Lynchburg, Virginia.

He also placed third in the U.S. 2000 Olympic Trials Marathon with a time of 2:17:04, but did not compete in the 2000 Sydney Olympics because he did not achieve the Olympic "A" standard qualifying time. He retired from competitive running in 2004.

== Coaching career ==
He has served as head coach of several cross country teams, including at Phillips Exeter Academy and Tufts University, and coached the distance runners at MIT for three years. Coogan served as the Dartmouth College women's cross country head coach after serving as an assistant for one season, and the assistant coach for the track programs as the primary coach of the distance runners.

In 2014, he began working for New Balance in Boston, Massachusetts in sports marketing as well becoming the coach of Team New Balance Boston with athletes such as Abbey D'Agostino whom he coached to 7 NCAA Championships at Dartmouth College.

In June 2021, Mark successfully coached American New Balance sponsored distance runners Elle Purrier St. Pierre of Vermont and Heather MacLean of Massachusetts in the 1,500 meters at the Olympic Trials at Haywood Field in Eugene, Oregon. Both women will represent the USA at the Paris Olympics.

== Personal life ==
Coogan and Gwyn Coogan have three children; two daughters, Katrina Coogan, a professional runner for New Balance Boston, and Margaret Coogan, who runs at George Washington University, and a son, William Coogan, who runs at UNC-Chapel Hill.

== Achievements ==
Year	Competition	Venue	Position	Notes
Representing the United States
1996	Olympic Games	Atlanta, United States	41st	Marathon
1995	Pan Am Games	Mar del Plata, Argentina	2nd	Marathon
