= Alex Maier =

American long-distance runner (born 2000)

Personal information
- Born: 22 January 2000 (age 26)

Sport
- Sport: Athletics
- Event(s): Long distance running, Cross country running

Achievements and titles
- Personal bests: Mile: 3:56.44 (Seattle, 2022); 3000m: 7:43.05 (New York, 2023); 5000m: 13:11.80 (Boston, 2022); 10,000m:28:12.68 (Eugene, 2022); Road; 10km: 28:57 (Cape Elizabeth, 2024); 10 Miles: 45:15 (Washington DC, 2025) NR; Half marathon: 59:23 (Houston, 2026); Marathon: 2:08:33 (Düsseldorf, 2025)

Alex Maier (born 22 January 2000) is an American long-distance runner. In 2025, he set an American national record in the 10-mile run, and won the USA Half Marathon Championships.

== Career ==
From Texas, Maier attended Flower Mound High School. In his final year, he won the 2018 UIL State Class 6A Championship and had a top-ten finish at NXN. Maier studied and competed at the collegiate level at Oklahoma State University from 2019, majoring in Electrical Engineering.

In June 2022, he was runner-up to Dylan Jacobs in the 10,000 metres at the 2022 NCAA Outdoor Championships in Eugene, Oregon. The following year, he placed fifteenth at the 2023 NCAA Cross Country Championships, helping Oklahoma State to win the men's competition.

After College, Maier transitioned to road running with Puma Elite. In March 2025, Maier won the USA Half Marathon Championships in a time of 1:00:48 in Atlanta, Georgia, winning from Shadrack Kipchirchir and Hillary Bor, and setting a 3-second personal best. On 6 April 2025, Maier set an American national record in the 10-mile run, running 45:15 at the USA 10 Mile Road Running Championships, in Washington, DC. Later that month, he ran 2:08:33 at the Düsseldorf Marathon in Germany. In June 2025, he won the USA 4 Mile Road Running Championships, running 18:04 in Peoria, Illinois. In July, he won the Bix 7 Road Race in Davenport, Iowa, ahead of defending champion Wesley Kiptoo.

On 11 January 2026, he ran a personal best 59:23 at the Houston Half Marathon to move to second on the American all-time list, six seconds from Conner Mantz's national record. He ran 59:51 to place fourth at the New York City Half Marathon in March 2026.
