= Molly Born =

American long-distance runner (born 1999)

Personal information
- Born: 18 November 1999 (age 26)

Sport
- Sport: Athletics
- Events: Long distance running, Cross country running

Molly Born (born 18 November 1999) is an American long-distance and cross country runner. She won the USA Marathon Championships in 2025, and was the first finisher at the 2026 USA Half Marathon Championships.

== Biography ==
From Kansas, Born attended Shawnee Mission Northwest High School and was a six-time Kansas state cross country champion and was named Gatorade Girls Kansas Cross Country Runner of the Year in 2017. She later competed as a Oklahoma State University athlete, where she was an NCAA All-American in cross country.

Running as part of the Puma Elite Running team, Born won in Albany in 2025 at the 47th Delightful Run For Women 5-K in 15:31, a personal best and the fastest time in the race for 11 years, despite wet weather conditions. Born had a fourth place finish at the 2025 USATF Women's 6k Road Championships in July 2025. In December, Born ran 2:24:09 to win the Sacramento California International Marathon and the USA Marathon Championships.

Born won the USA Half Marathon Championships in 2026 in Atlanta ahead of Carrie Ellwood and Annie Rodenfels. However, the race was marred by controversy as some of the leading racers were directed away from the correct course. At the conclusion of the race Born wrote on Instagram that "I do not feel like the winner of the 2026 USATF Half Marathon Championships...I did not see the top 3 ladies make the wrong turn, and thus had no idea I was technically in the lead after the fatefully confusing intersection with about a mile to go". She was subsequently included in the United States team for the World Road Running Championships in Copenhagen, Denmark, for her international debut.
