= Kimberley May =

New Zealand middle-distance runner (born 2003)

Personal information
- Nationality: New Zealand
- Born: 8 May 2003 (age 23) Auckland, New Zealand

Sport
- Sport: Athletics
- Event(s): Middle-distance running, Cross country running
- Club: New Balance 7/2025 - present

Achievements and titles
- Personal best(s): 800m: 2:03.46 (2024); 1500m: 4:04.40 (2025); Mile: 4:27.36 (2024)
Medal record
Women's athletics
Representing New Zealand
Summer World University Games
Bronze medal – third place	2025 Bochum	1500 m

Kimberley May (born 8 May 2003) is a New Zealand middle-distance and cross country runner. She was runner-up over 1500 metres at the 2024 NCAA Outdoor Championships and a bronze medalist over 1500 metres in 2025 at the FISU World University Games.

== Early and personal life ==
From Auckland, she competed in karate as a youngster and has the black belt in the discipline. She attended Avondale College before moving to the United States in 2021 to study at Providence College in Rhode Island where she studied sociology.

== NCAA career ==
In February 2024, she ran 4:27.85 in the mile run whilst competing at in Boston, Massachusetts. She finished third in the indoor mile at the 2024 NCAA Division I Indoor Track and Field Championships on 9 March 2024, finishing behind compatriot Maia Ramsden and Billah Jepkirui of Kenya, in 4:27.36. That June, she finished runner-up over 1500 metres to Ramsden at the 2024 NCAA Division I Outdoor Track and Field Championships in Eugene, Oregon. In November 2024, she finished tenth in the 2024 NCAA Division I Cross Country Championships and was part of the Providence team which finished third overall.

May placed third with Providence in the distance medley relay at the 2025 NCAA Division I Indoor Track and Field Championships alongside Shannon Flockhart, Maeve O'Neill and Jillian Flennerty. She ran a personal best 4:06.58 for the 1500 metres at the Raleigh Relays in North Carolina in March 2025, finishing behind Margot Appleton, and moving to ninth on the NCAA all-time list. In June 2025, she placed sixth in the final of the 1500 metres at the 2025 NCAA Championships.

== Professional career ==
In July 2025, she moved to second on the Athletics New Zealand all-time 1500 metres list, behind Maia Ramsden, running 4:04.40 at the Internazionale Sport Solidarietà meeting in Italy.

Kimberley May won the bronze medal in the 1500 metres (4:20.39) at the 2025 Summer World University Games in Bochum, Germany. She turned professional with New Balance.
