= Shannon Flockhart =

British athlete (born 2002)

Personal information
- Nationality: British
- Born: 5 April 2002 (age 24)

Sport
- Sport: Athletics
- Event: Middle distance running

Achievements and titles
- Personal best: 1500m: 4:04.98 (2024)
Medal record
Women's Athletics
Representing Great Britain
European U23 Championships
Bronze medal – third place	2023 Espoo	1500 metres

Shannon Flockhart (born 5 April 2002) is a British middle distance runner.

== Early life ==
From Cambridge, in 2016 she won school middle distance titles in Cambridgeshire and East Anglia. That year, she also finished in the top 10 of the English schools cross-country championships in her age group. She went on to win the senior girls title at the Cambridgeshire schools cross country championships in January 2020 before placing fourth in the senior girls English cross country championship in March 2020 in Liverpool.

== Career ==
She is a member of Cambridge & Coleridge Athletic Club. She was a bronze medalist in the 1500 metres at the 2023 European Athletics U23 Championships in Espoo.

In June 2024, she placed sixth overall in the 1500 metres at the NCAA Division 1 Finals in Eugene, Oregon, competing for Providence College.

In November 2024, she was named by British Athletics on the Olympic Futures Programme for 2025. On 23 November 2024, she was part of the Providence team which finished third in the 2024 NCAA Division I Cross Country Championships. She placed third with Providence in the distance medley relay at the 2025 NCAA Division I Indoor Track and Field Championships alongside Kimberley May, Maeve O'Neill and Jillian Flennerty.

On 2 August, she qualified for the final of the 1500 metres at the 2025 UK Athletics Championships in Birmingham. In October 2025, she was named on the British Athletics Olympic Futures Programme for 2025/26. She turned professional with New Balance.

== Personal life ==
In 2024 she completed an undergraduate degree in Political Science at Providence College in Rhode Island before starting a Masters in Education at the establishment.
