= 2022 World Athletics U20 Championships – Men's 4 × 400 metres relay =

Men's 4 × 400 metres relay at the 2022 World Athletics U20 Championships
- Venue: Estadio Olímpico Pascual Guerrero
- Dates: 5 August (heats); 6 August (final)
- Competitors: 92 from 21 nations
- Winning time: 3:04.47

Medalists
gold medal	Steven McElroy; Ashton Schwartzman; Charlie Bartholomew; Will Sumner; Kody Blackwood*; Grant Williams*	United States
silver medal	Shemar Palmer; Shaemar Uter; Jasauna Dennis; Delano Kennedy; Malachi Johnson*; Derrick Grant*	Jamaica
bronze medal	Christopher Morales-Williams; Ben Tilson; Daniel Kidd; Tyler Floyd; Riley Flemington*	Canada

The men's 4 × 400 metres relay at the 2022 World Athletics U20 Championships was held at the Estadio Olímpico Pascual Guerrero in Cali, Colombia on 5 and 6 August 2022.

== Records ==
Standing records prior to the 2022 World Athletics U20 Championships
World U20 Record	United States	3:00.33	Trujillo, Peru	23 July 2017
Championship Record	United States	3:01.09	Grosseto, Italy	18 July 2004
World U20 Leading	United States	3:02.58	Walnut, United States	16 April 2022

== Results ==
=== Heats ===
Qualification: First 2 of each heat ( Q ) plus the 2 fastest times ( q ) qualified for the final.

Rank	Heat	Nation	Athletes	Time	Notes
1	3	Japan	Shion Arita, Masataka Tomoda, Sojiro Moritaka, Daiki Ogawa	3:07.25	Q, SB
2	2	Jamaica	Malachi Johnson, Delano Kennedy, Derrick Grant, Shemar Palmer	3:07.32	Q, SB
3	3	Czech Republic	Tadeáš Plaček, Vojtěch Cihlář, Ondřej Veselý, Michal Haidelmeier	3:07.48	Q, NU20R
4	2	Spain	Ángel González, David Garcia, Alberto Guijarro, Gerson Pozo	3:07.58	Q, SB
5	1	United States	Ashton Schwartzman, Kody Blackwood, Grant Williams, Will Sumner	3:07.82	Q, SB
6	3	France	Matteo Lorusso, Benoît Moudio Priso, Allan Lacroix, Lucas Vivin	3:07.84	q, SB
7	3	South Africa	Ruan Oosthuizen, Lythe Pillay, Tjaart van der Walt, Divan Vlok	3:07.90	q, SB
8	3	Germany	Florian Kroll, Lukas Krappe, Lasse Schmitt, Maximilian Köhler	3:08.04	SB
9	1	Canada	Christopher Morales-Williams, Ben Tilson, Riley Flemington, Tyler Floyd	3:08.35	Q, SB
10	1	Italy	Tommaso Boninti, Francesco Pernici, Marco Zunino, Luca Sito	3:08.55	SB
11	2	Great Britain	Brodie Young, Cameron McGregor, Bayleigh Lawton, Reuben Henry-Daire	3:08.59	SB
12	2	Poland	Maks Szwed, Adam Kadyło, Jakub Szczepaniak, Remigiusz Zazula	3:09.05	SB
13	1	Botswana	Busang Collen Kebinatshipi, Thabang Charles Monngathipa, Unametsi Nyathi, Gaolebale Prince Soulo	3:09.19	SB
14	2	Thailand	Supakit Janmao, Lukki Yuyamadu, Nakha Phingthaisong, Joshua Atkinson	3:10.17	SB
15	1	Brazil	Jadson Erick Soares Lima, João Victor Belo de Sena, Janio Marcos Gonçalves, Elias Oliveira	3:11.69	SB
16	3	Slovakia	Samuel Michalko, Tomáš Grajcarík, Roman Haraslín, Franklin Henry	3:12.43	NU20R
17	2	India	Barath Sridhar, Deepak Rohilla, Rihan Choudary, Kapil	3:15.00	SB
18	3	Ecuador	Edwin Arias, Hector Broncano, Dusthin Morquecho, Freddy Vásquez	3:15.58	SB
	1	Romania	Sorin Alexandru Voinea, Denis Gabriel Neacsu, Remus Andrei Niculiță, Denis Simon Toma	DNF	
	2	Nigeria	Samuel Ogazi, James Onwuka, David Aya, Bamidele Ajayi	DQ	TR24.19
	2	Kuwait	Yaqoub Mohamed Al-Azemi, Mubarak Mubarak, Mohammd Al Atia, Faraj Al Ajeel	DQ	TR17.4.3
	1	Bahamas		DNS	

=== Final ===
The final was held on 6 August at 17:47.

Rank	Nation	Athletes	Time	Notes
1st place, gold medalist(s)	United States	Steven McElroy, Ashton Schwartzman, Charlie Bartholomew, Will Sumner	3:04.47	SB
2nd place, silver medalist(s)	Jamaica	Shemar Palmer, Shaemar Uter, Jasauna Dennis, Delano Kennedy	3:05.72	SB
3rd place, bronze medalist(s)	Canada	Christopher Morales-Williams, Ben Tilson, Daniel Kidd, Tyler Floyd	3:06.50	NU20R
4	Spain	Markel Fernández, Ángel González, Alberto Guijarro, Gerson Pozo	3:06.91	NU20R
5	South Africa	Tjaart van der Walt, Lythe Pillay, Karabo Try Madonsela, Divan Vlok	3:07.01	SB
6	Japan	Shion Arita, Masataka Tomoda, Sojiro Moritaka, Daiki Ogawa	3:07.47	
7	Czech Republic	Tadeáš Plaček, Vojtěch Cihlář, Ondřej Veselý, Michal Haidelmeier	3:09.36	
8	France	Matteo Lorusso, Benoît Moudio Priso, Allan Lacroix, Sonny Gandrey	3:09.54	
