= 2023 NACAC U23 Championships in Athletics – Results =

These are the results of the 2023 NACAC U23 Championships in Athletics which took place between 21 and 23 July, at the Estadio Nacional in San José, Costa Rica.

== Men's results ==
=== 100 metres ===
Heats – 21 July
Wind:
Heat 1: +3.1 m/s, Heat 2: +3.1 m/s, Heat 3: +1.9 m/s

Rank	Heat	Name	Nationality	Time	Notes
1	1	Adrian Kerr	Jamaica	10.09	Q
2	3	Travis Williams	Jamaica	10.11	Q, PB
3	3	Diego González	Puerto Rico	10.13	Q, NR
4	2	Earl Simmonds	Saint Vincent and the Grenadines	10.16	Q
5	1	Omari Lewis	Trinidad and Tobago	10.22	Q
5	2	Sam Blaskowski	United States	10.22	Q
7	1	Rodney Heath Jr.	United States	10.23	q
8	2	Adam Musgrove	Bahamas	10.30	q
9	3	Darian Clarke	Barbados	10.32	PB
10	1	Darion Skerritt	Antigua and Barbuda	10.37	
10	2	Yeykell Romero	Nicaragua	10.37	
12	3	Wanyae Belle	British Virgin Islands	10.45	PB
13	1	Alejandro Ricketts	Costa Rica	10.49	
14	2	Dominic Cole	Trinidad and Tobago	10.65	
15	3	Shamayl Kooper	Costa Rica	10.77	
16	1	Terrone Webster	Anguilla	10.84	
17	3	Sanjay Weekes	Montserrat	11.02	
18	2	Glenford Williams	Belize	16.33	
	1	Darren Pierret	Turks and Caicos Islands	DQ	

Final – 21 July

Wind: +1.7 m/s

Rank	Lane	Name	Nationality	Time	Notes
1st place, gold medalist(s)	4	Adrian Kerr	Jamaica	10.08	PB
2nd place, silver medalist(s)	5	Travis Williams	Jamaica	10.12	
3rd place, bronze medalist(s)	3	Diego González	Puerto Rico	10.22	
4	2	Omari Lewis	Trinidad and Tobago	10.28	PB
5	7	Sam Blaskowski	United States	10.34	
6	6	Earl Simmonds	Saint Vincent and the Grenadines	10.35	PB
7	8	Adam Musgrove	Bahamas	10.45	
8	1	Rodney Heath Jr.	United States	10.63	

=== 200 metres ===
Heats – 22 July
Wind:
Heat 1: +0.4 m/s, Heat 2: 0.0 m/s, Heat 3: -0.1 m/s

Rank	Heat	Name	Nationality	Time	Notes
1	2	Connor Washington	United States	20.85	Q
2	2	Demar Francis	Jamaica	20.99	Q
3	1	Callum Robinson	Canada	21.00	Q
4	3	Brice Chabot	United States	21.02	Q
5	1	Terrence Jones Jr.	Bahamas	21.07	Q
5	3	Darion Skerritt	Antigua and Barbuda	21.07	Q
7	1	Timothy Frederick	Trinidad and Tobago	21.13	q
8	3	Darian Clarke	Barbados	21.16	q
9	1	Alexavier Monfries	Jamaica	21.22	
10	2	Adam Musgrove	Bahamas	21.31	
11	3	Almond Small	Canada	21.42	
12	3	Wanyae Belle	British Virgin Islands	21.42	
13	1	Yeykell Romero	Nicaragua	21.46	
14	2	Raheem Taitt-Best	Barbados	21.86	
15	2	Suresh Black	Bermuda	21.96	
16	1	Alejandro Ricketts	Costa Rica	21.97	
17	3	José René Navas	El Salvador	22.37	
18	3	Sanjay Weekes	Montserrat	22.42	
19	1	Terrone Webster	Anguilla	22.62	
20	2	Samuel José Ibáñez	El Salvador	22.97	
21	2	Antony Barrantes	Costa Rica	23.13	
	1	Rayvon Hilly Walkin	Turks and Caicos Islands	DNS	
	2	Brandon Davis	Haiti	DNS	

Final – 23 July

Wind: +1.7 m/s

Rank	Lane	Name	Nationality	Time	Notes
1st place, gold medalist(s)	3	Callum Robinson	Canada	20.52	PB
2nd place, silver medalist(s)	5	Demar Francis	Jamaica	20.67	
3rd place, bronze medalist(s)	4	Connor Washington	United States	20.74	
4	6	Brice Chabot	United States	20.83	
5	7	Darion Skerritt	Antigua and Barbuda	20.90	PB
6	8	Darian Clarke	Barbados	20.91	PB
7	1	Timothy Frederick	Trinidad and Tobago	21.39	
	2	Terrence Jones Jr.	Bahamas	DNS	

=== 400 metres ===
Heats – 21 July

Rank	Heat	Name	Nationality	Time	Notes
1	1	Reheem Hayles	Jamaica	45.15	Q
2	1	William Jones	United States	45.17	Q
3	2	Michael Roth	Canada	45.82	Q, PB
4	2	Kyle Gale	Barbados	46.00	Q
5	1	Tyrique Johnson	Barbados	46.28	Q
6	2	D'Andre Anderson	Jamaica	46.47	Q
7	1	Amal Glasgow	Saint Vincent and the Grenadines	46.48	q
8	2	Wilbert Encarnación	Dominican Republic	47.61	q
9	1	Malik John	British Virgin Islands	48.43	
10	2	José René Navas	El Salvador	48.48	
11	2	Darius Rainey	United States	48.82	
12	2	José Adrian Rowe	Costa Rica	50.73	
	1	Brandon Davis	Haiti	DNS	
	1	Dennick Luke	Dominica	DNS	

Final – 22 July

Rank	Lane	Name	Nationality	Time	Notes
1st place, gold medalist(s)	7	D'Andre Anderson	Jamaica	45.56	
2nd place, silver medalist(s)	5	Kyle Gale	Barbados	45.80	
3rd place, bronze medalist(s)	6	William Jones	United States	45.95	
4	3	Michael Roth	Canada	46.47	
5	4	Reheem Hayles	Jamaica	46.69	
6	1	Amal Glasgow	Saint Vincent and the Grenadines	47.10	
7	2	Tyrique Johnson	Barbados	47.35	
	8	Wilbert Encarnación	Dominican Republic	DQ	FS

=== 800 metres ===
23 July

Rank	Name	Nationality	Time	Notes
1st place, gold medalist(s)	Handal Roban	Saint Vincent and the Grenadines	1:47.43	
2nd place, silver medalist(s)	Sean Dolan	United States	1:47.54	
3rd place, bronze medalist(s)	Dennick Luke	Dominica	1:47.62	NR
4	Abdullahi Hassan	Canada	1:47.63	
5	Leroy Russell	Canada	1:52.18	
6	Genesis Joseph	Trinidad and Tobago	1:52.69	
7	Will Sumner	United States	1:52.79	
8	Jahleel Armstrong	Barbados	1:54.05	
9	Luis Segura	Costa Rica	1:55.11	
10	Matthew Cook	Costa Rica	1:56.02	
11	Fredd Ponce	Nicaragua	1:56.65	
12	Stefan Camejo	Trinidad and Tobago	1:59.65	

=== 1500 metres ===
23 July

Rank	Name	Nationality	Time	Notes
1st place, gold medalist(s)	Emile Toupin	Canada	4:00.01	
2nd place, silver medalist(s)	Héctor Pagan	Puerto Rico	4:01.61	
3rd place, bronze medalist(s)	Foster Malleck	Canada	4:02.43	
4	Brandon Barrantes	Costa Rica	4:05.82	
5	Ryan Outerbridge	Bermuda	4:06.29	
6	Josenyer Cabrera	Dominican Republic	4:06.34	

=== 5000 metres ===
21 July

Rank	Name	Nationality	Time	Notes
1st place, gold medalist(s)	Cole Sprout	United States	14:11.78	CR
2nd place, silver medalist(s)	Héctor Pagan	Puerto Rico	14:29.39	
3rd place, bronze medalist(s)	Estebán Oses	Costa Rica	15:33.04	

=== 110 metres hurdles ===
Heats – 22 July
Wind:
Heat 1: +0.6 m/s, Heat 2: -0.1 m/s

Rank	Heat	Name	Nationality	Time	Notes
1	2	Craig Thorne	Canada	13.52	Q
2	1	Connor Schulman	United States	13.55	Q
3	1	Jaheem Hayles	Jamaica	13.80	Q
4	2	Issiah Patrick	Grenada	13.87	Q
5	1	Antoine Andrews	Bahamas	14.09	Q
6	1	Edgardo López	Puerto Rico	14.10	q
7	2	Jordani Woodley	Jamaica	14.21	Q
8	1	David Adeleye	Canada	14.30	q
9	2	Justin Guy	Trinidad and Tobago	14.46	
10	2	José Manuel Marín	Costa Rica	15.87	
11	1	Glenford Williams	Belize	18.13	
	2	Jayden Smith	United States	DQ	R22.6

Final – 22 July

Wind: +0.6 m/s

Rank	Lane	Name	Nationality	Time	Notes
1st place, gold medalist(s)	5	Connor Schulman	United States	13.40	
2nd place, silver medalist(s)	2	Antoine Andrews	Bahamas	13.57	PB
3rd place, bronze medalist(s)	3	Jaheem Hayles	Jamaica	13.73	
4	7	Edgardo López	Puerto Rico	13.99	
5	8	David Adeleye	Canada	14.13	
	4	Craig Thorne	Canada	DQ	R17.2.2
	1	Jordani Woodley	Jamaica	DNF	
	6	Issiah Patrick	Grenada	DNF	

=== 400 metres hurdles ===
21 July

Rank	Lane	Name	Nationality	Time	Notes
1st place, gold medalist(s)	5	Caleb Cavanaugh	United States	49.35	
2nd place, silver medalist(s)	4	Assinie Wilson	Jamaica	49.70	
3rd place, bronze medalist(s)	3	Yeral Núñez	Dominican Republic	49.95	
4	6	Michael Olasio	Puerto Rico	51.91	
5	1	Gary Altamirano	Costa Rica	53.53	PB
6	2	Dorian Charles	Trinidad and Tobago	53.71	
7	7	Samuel José Ibáñez	El Salvador	54.42	

=== 3000 metres steeplechase ===
23 July

Rank	Name	Nationality	Time	Notes
1st place, gold medalist(s)	Kevin Robertson	Canada	9:04.77	
2nd place, silver medalist(s)	Paulo Gómez	Costa Rica	9:10.48	
3rd place, bronze medalist(s)	Carson Williams	United States	9:30.66	

=== 4 × 100 metres relay ===
22 July

Rank	Lane	Nation	Competitors	Time	Notes
1st place, gold medalist(s)	5	Jamaica	Jehlani Gordon, Adrian Kerr, Travis Williams, Shakur Williams	39.04	
2nd place, silver medalist(s)	3	Bahamas	Antoine Andrews, Adam Musgrove, Carlos Brown Jr., Terrence Jones Jr.	39.59	
3rd place, bronze medalist(s)	6	United States	Blaise Atkinson, Brice Chabot, Rodney Heath, Samuel Blaskowski	39.62	
4	4	Trinidad and Tobago	Justin Guy, Omari Lewis, Timothy Frederick, Dominic Cole	40.19	
5	2	Costa Rica	Gary Altamirano, Antony Barrantes, Alejandro Ricketts, Shamayl Kooper	41.77	

=== 4 × 400 metres relay ===
23 July

Rank	Lane	Nation	Competitors	Time	Notes
1st place, gold medalist(s)	6	Jamaica	Assinie Wilson, Reheem Hayles, Delano Kenedy, D'Andre Anderson	3:02.44	
2nd place, silver medalist(s)	3	United States	William Jones, Caleb Cavanaugh, Connor Washington, Will Sumner	3:03.84	
3rd place, bronze medalist(s)	7	Barbados	Tyrique Johnson, Jahleel Armstrong, Kyle Gale, Raheem Taitt-Best	3:04.33	
4	5	Canada	Callum Robinson, Abdullahi Hassan, Almond Small, Michael Roth	3:06.37	
5	4	Trinidad and Tobago	Genesis Joseph, Timothy Frederick, Dorian Charles, Stefan Camejo	3:11.25	
	2	Costa Rica	Gary Altamirano, Luis Segura, José Adrian Rowe, Shamayl Kooper	DQ	R24.19

=== 10,000 metres walk ===
22 July

Rank	Name	Nationality	Time	Notes
1	José Mariano Ordóñez	Guatemala	44:55.05	
2	Samuel Allen	United States	49:26.82	

=== High jump ===
23 July

Rank	Name	Nationality	1.85	2.00	2.05	2.10	2.15	2.18	2.21	2.24	Result	Notes
1st place, gold medalist(s)	Romaine Beckford	Jamaica	–	–	–	xo	xo	o	o	xxx	2.21	
2nd place, silver medalist(s)	Kason O'Riley	United States	–	–	o	o	o	o	xxx		2.18	
3rd place, bronze medalist(s)	Shaun Miller	Bahamas	–	–	–	xxo	o	–	xx–	x	2.15	
4	Andrew Taylor	United States	–	o	o	o	xxo	xxx			2.15	
5	Aiden Grout	Canada	–	–	o	xo	xxx				2.10	
	Justin Briceño	Costa Rica	xxx								NM	

=== Pole vault ===
23 July

Rank	Name	Nationality	4.35	4.50	4.65	4.75	4.85	4.95	5.15	5.35	5.50	5.61	5.72	Result	Notes
1st place, gold medalist(s)	Hunter Garretson	United States	–	–	–	–	–	–	–	xo	o	xxo	xxx	5.61	
2nd place, silver medalist(s)	Brenden Vanderpool	Bahamas	–	–	o	xxo	–	o	xxx					4.95	
3rd place, bronze medalist(s)	Jonathan López	Puerto Rico	–	o	o	o	xxx							4.75	
4	Daniel Machado	El Salvador	o	xxx										4.35	
	Clayton Simms	United States	–	–	–	–	–	–	–	xxx				NM	

=== Long jump ===
22 July

Rank	Name	Nationality	#1	#2	#3	#4	#5	#6	Result	Notes
1st place, gold medalist(s)	Malcolm Clemons	United States	7.97	8.01	6.06	x	x	8.21	8.21	PB
2nd place, silver medalist(s)	Jeremiah Davis	United States	7.88	7.97	8.10w	x	7.93	7.98	8.10w	
3rd place, bronze medalist(s)	Jordan Turner	Jamaica	x	x	7.72	7.82	7.82	7.40	7.82	
4	Uroy Ryan	Saint Vincent and the Grenadines	7.52w	7.71	7.80	7.67	7.33	7.71	7.80	PB
5	Kavion Kerr	Jamaica	7.69	7.69w	x	6.94	4.70	7.31	7.69	
6	Issiah Patrick	Grenada	7.21w	7.17	7.25	x	7.40w	7.07	7.40w	
7	Kelsey Daniel	Trinidad and Tobago	7.15	–	–	–	–	–	7.15	
	Marc Jeannot	Haiti							DNS	
	Rayvon Walkin	Turks and Caicos Islands							DNS	

=== Triple jump ===
21 July

Rank	Name	Nationality	#1	#2	#3	#4	#5	#6	Result	Notes
1st place, gold medalist(s)	Russell Robinson	United States	16.64w	x	16.00	16.36w	x	14.72w	16.64w	
2nd place, silver medalist(s)	Salif Mane	United States	x	16.49	x	–	x	x	16.49	
3rd place, bronze medalist(s)	Kelsey Daniel	Trinidad and Tobago	15.76	15.99	x	x	14.54	16.19w	16.19w	
4	Kenneth West	Canada	x	14.86w	x	15.84w	13.42w	x	15.84w	
5	Marc Jeannot	Haiti	x	13.17w	14.97w	–	14.85w	15.15	15.15	
	Elias Ocampo	Costa Rica	x	x	x	r			NM	
	Uroy Ryan	Saint Vincent and the Grenadines							DNS	

=== Shot put ===
21 July

Rank	Name	Nationality	#1	#2	#3	#4	#5	#6	Result	Notes
1st place, gold medalist(s)	Maxwell Otterdahl	United States	x	x	x	18.79	x	19.41	19.41	
2nd place, silver medalist(s)	Jason Swarens	United States	18.05	x	18.91	19.02	17.70	18.53	19.02	
3rd place, bronze medalist(s)	Christopher Crawford	Trinidad and Tobago	x	17.84	x	x	x	x	17.84	
4	Kobe Lawrence	Jamaica	x	15.29	16.44	17.45	x	17.37	17.45	
5	Jorge Contreras	Puerto Rico	15.61	16.31	x	x	x	x	16.31	
6	Jeims Molina	Costa Rica	13.30	13.77	13.36	x	x	x	13.77	

=== Discus throw ===
21 July

Rank	Name	Nationality	#1	#2	#3	#4	#5	#6	Result	Notes
1st place, gold medalist(s)	Ralford Mullings	Jamaica	59.25	61.18	60.20	x	59.33	x	61.18	
2nd place, silver medalist(s)	Jaden James	Trinidad and Tobago	45.74	46.57	43.50	48.15	50.07	53.59	53.59	
3rd place, bronze medalist(s)	Aidan Elbettar	United States	x	50.63	x	52.53	52.32	53.21	53.21	
4	Tarajh Hudson	Bahamas	x	50.63	x	52.53	52.32	53.21	47.23	
5	Joangel Herrera	Dominican Republic	45.29	42.43	44.85	43.45	44.44	44.25	45.29	
6	Antwon Walkin	Turks and Caicos Islands	40.60	42.88	39.64	41.03	43.57	37.02	43.57	
7	Jeims Molina	Costa Rica	41.78	x	x	x	x	x	41.78	

=== Hammer throw ===
22 July

Rank	Name	Nationality	#1	#2	#3	#4	#5	#6	Result	Notes
1st place, gold medalist(s)	Kyle Moison	United States	60.02	62.48	64.93	63.38	63.10	64.36	64.93	
2nd place, silver medalist(s)	Kade McCall	United States	x	64.25	64.46	64.37	64.69	x	64.69	
3rd place, bronze medalist(s)	Michael Soler	Puerto Rico	x	59.14	58.97	58.34	58.12	62.83	62.83	
4	Rodrigo Morán	Guatemala	53.63	55.44	55.14	55.96	54.65	54.69	55.96	
5	Jeims Molina	Costa Rica	x	44.60	47.94	x	x	39.81	47.94	

=== Javelin throw ===
22 July

Rank	Name	Nationality	#1	#2	#3	#4	#5	#6	Result	Notes
1st place, gold medalist(s)	Keyshawn Strachan	Bahamas	65.76	68.42	78.37	71.33	–	66.76	78.37	
2nd place, silver medalist(s)	Dash Sirmon	United States	63.87	64.52	75.28	59.89	71.65	70.87	75.28	
3rd place, bronze medalist(s)	Braden Presser	United States	68.40	72.60	66.21	66.03	66.33	69.76	72.60	
4	José Alejandro Santana	Puerto Rico	56.88	62.21	68.50	67.24	65.93	69.20	69.20	
5	Dorian Charles	Trinidad and Tobago	x	53.33	x	53.02	x	52.02	53.33	

=== Decathlon ===
21–22 July

Rank	Name	Nationality	100m	LJ	SP	HJ	400m	110m H	DT	PV	JT	1500m	Points	Notes
1	Guillermo Alfonso	Guatemala	11.45	6.52w	12.66	1.85	51.34	16.08	38.68	4.40	44.76	4:51.32	6815	
	Heath Baldwin	United States											DNS	

== Women's results ==
=== 100 metres ===
Heats – 21 July
Wind:
Heat 1: +5.5 m/s, Heat 2: +2.1 m/s

Rank	Heat	Name	Nationality	Time	Notes
1	1	Mia Brahe-Pedersen	United States	11.01	Q
2	1	Marie-Éloïse Leclair	Canada	11.35	Q
3	2	Leah Bertrand	Trinidad and Tobago	11.36	Q
4	1	Beyoncé De Freitas	British Virgin Islands	11.37	Q
5	2	Camille Rutherford	Barbados	11.43	Q
6	1	Mariandre Chacón	Guatemala	11.48	q
7	1	Taejha Badal	Trinidad and Tobago	11.65	
8	2	Ashantai Bollers	Canada	11.70	Q
9	2	Gladymar Torres	Puerto Rico	11.77	
10	2	Ivanniz Blackwood	Costa Rica	12.44	
	1	Tania Alfaro	Costa Rica	DNS	

Final – 21 July

Wind: +0.7 m/s

Rank	Lane	Name	Nationality	Time	Notes
1st place, gold medalist(s)	4	Mia Brahe-Pedersen	United States	11.08	
2nd place, silver medalist(s)	3	Leah Bertrand	Trinidad and Tobago	11.27	
3rd place, bronze medalist(s)	6	Beyoncé De Freitas	British Virgin Islands	11.41	
4	2	Camille Rutherford	Barbados	11.47	
5	5	Marie-Éloïse Leclair	Canada	11.50	
6	1	Taejha Badal	Trinidad and Tobago	11.70	
7	7	Mariandre Chacón	Guatemala	11.76	
8	8	Ashantai Bollers	Canada	11.91	

=== 200 metres ===
Heats – 22 July
Wind:
Heat 1: -0.1 m/s, Heat 2: +1.3 m/s

Rank	Heat	Name	Nationality	Time	Notes
1	1	Mia Brahe-Pedersen	United States	22.94	Q
2	2	Niesha Burgher	Jamaica	23.37	Q
3	2	Beyoncé De Freitas	British Virgin Islands	23.42	Q
4	2	Marie-Éloïse Leclair	Canada	23.44	Q
5	1	Ashantai Bollers	Canada	23.82	Q
6	1	Shaquena Foote	Jamaica	23.82	Q
7	1	Camille Rutherford	Bahamas	24.00	q
8	2	Mariandre Chacón	Guatemala	24.11	q
9	1	Naomi Campbell	Trinidad and Tobago	24.67	
10	2	Akrissa Eristee	British Virgin Islands	24.89	
11	1	Ivanniz Blackwood	Costa Rica	25.76	
	2	Chyna Simmons	Turks and Caicos Islands	DNS	

Final – 23 July

Wind: +0.1 m/s

Rank	Lane	Name	Nationality	Time	Notes
1st place, gold medalist(s)	4	Mia Brahe-Pedersen	United States	23.05	
2nd place, silver medalist(s)	6	Beyoncé De Freitas	British Virgin Islands	23.59	
3rd place, bronze medalist(s)	7	Ashantai Bollers	Canada	23.84	
4	3	Marie-Éloïse Leclair	Canada	23.91	
5	2	Shaquena Foote	Jamaica	23.93	
6	5	Niesha Burgher	Jamaica	23.98	
7	8	Camille Rutherford	Bahamas	24.28	
8	1	Mariandre Chacón	Guatemala	24.61	

=== 400 metres ===
Heats – 21 July

Rank	Heat	Name	Nationality	Time	Notes
1	2	Ziyah Holman	United States	51.51	Q
2	1	Jermaisha Arnold	United States	51.65	Q
3	2	Shanakaye Anderson	Jamaica	52.19	Q, PB
4	2	Megan Moss	Bahamas	54.56	Q
5	1	Joanne Reid	Jamaica	54.98	Q
6	1	Caitlyn Bobb	Bermuda	55.15	Q
7	1	Akrissa Eristee	British Virgin Islands	56.29	q
8	2	Melanie Vargas	Costa Rica	57.79	q
9	1	Naydelin Calderón	Costa Rica	57.81	
	2	Chyna Simmons	Turks and Caicos Islands	DNS	
	2	Lydia Troupe	Belize	DNS	

Final – 22 July

Rank	Lane	Name	Nationality	Time	Notes
1st place, gold medalist(s)	6	Jermaisha Arnold	United States	50.68	CR
2nd place, silver medalist(s)	4	Ziyah Holman	United States	50.95	
3rd place, bronze medalist(s)	7	Shanakaye Anderson	Jamaica	52.27	
4	2	Joanne Reid	Jamaica	54.10	
5	1	Akrissa Eristee	British Virgin Islands	55.92	
6	3	Caitlyn Bobb	Bermuda	56.00	
7	8	Melanie Vargas	Costa Rica	57.44	
	5	Megan Moss	Bahamas	DNS	

=== 800 metres ===
23 July

Rank	Name	Nationality	Time	Notes
1st place, gold medalist(s)	Olivia Cooper	Canada	2:07.59	
2nd place, silver medalist(s)	Cassandra Williamson	Canada	2:07.83	
3rd place, bronze medalist(s)	Mikaela Smith	United States Virgin Islands	2:12.80	
4	Paola Rodríguez	Puerto Rico	2:15.61	
5	Melanie Vargas	Costa Rica	2:33.13	

=== 1500 metres ===
23 July

Rank	Name	Nationality	Time	Notes
1st place, gold medalist(s)	Addison Wiley	United States	4:05.84	CR
2nd place, silver medalist(s)	Elise Shea	United States	4:14.90	
3rd place, bronze medalist(s)	Holly Macgillivray	Canada	4:15.99	
4	Tiana Lostracco	Canada	4:16.58	
5	Yuliannie Lugo	Puerto Rico	4:42.53	
6	Mikaela Smith	United States Virgin Islands	4:55.09	
7	María Nellys Chaves	Costa Rica	5:02.06	

=== 5000 metres ===
21 July

Rank	Name	Nationality	Time	Notes
1st place, gold medalist(s)	Layla Roebke	United States	17:24.61	
2nd place, silver medalist(s)	Jorelis Vargas	Puerto Rico	17:56.56	
3rd place, bronze medalist(s)	Yuliannie Lugo	Puerto Rico	18:05.18	
4	Yesica Raxón	Guatemala	18:20.86	
5	María Nellys Chaves	Costa Rica	20:15.24	

=== 100 metres hurdles ===
22 July
Wind: -0.2 m/s

Rank	Lane	Name	Nationality	Time	Notes
1st place, gold medalist(s)	5	Rayniah Jones	United States	12.78	
2nd place, silver medalist(s)	4	Crystal Morrison	Jamaica	12.81	
3rd place, bronze medalist(s)	3	Destiny Huven	United States	13.19	
4	6	Aliyah Logan	Canada	13.45	
5	2	Nya Browne	Barbados	13.58	
6	7	Noelia Vivas	Costa Rica	15.60	

=== 400 metres hurdles ===
21 July

Rank	Lane	Name	Nationality	Time	Notes
1st place, gold medalist(s)	4	Shani'a Bellamy	United States	55.48	PB
2nd place, silver medalist(s)	5	Vanessa Watson	United States	56.05	
3rd place, bronze medalist(s)	3	Garriel White	Jamaica	56.94	
4	6	Lydia Troupe	Belize	1:02.70	

=== 4 × 100 metres relay ===
22 July

Rank	Lane	Nation	Competitors	Time	Notes
1st place, gold medalist(s)	5	United States	Kaila Jackson, Rayniah Jones, Sophia Beckmon, Mia Brahe-Pedersen	42.74	CR
2nd place, silver medalist(s)	4	Jamaica	Crystal Morrison, Shaqueena Foote, Niesha Burgher, Shana-Kaye Anderson	43.80	
3rd place, bronze medalist(s)	6	Trinidad and Tobago	Reneisha Andrews, Shaniqua Bascombe, Taejha Badal, Leah Bertrand	44.50	
4	3	Costa Rica	Tiphanny Madrigal, Naydelin Calderón, Melanie Vargas, Ivanniz Blackwood	50.49	

=== 4 × 400 metres relay ===
23 July

Rank	Lane	Nation	Competitors	Time	Notes
1st place, gold medalist(s)	5	United States	Ziyah Holman, Kiah Williams, Jan'taijah Ford, Jermaisha Arnold	3:26.83	CR
2nd place, silver medalist(s)	6	Jamaica	Garriel White, Shaqueena Foote, Joanne Reid, Shana-Kaye Anderson	3:28.50	
3rd place, bronze medalist(s)	4	Costa Rica	Naydelin Calderón, Tiphanny Madrigal, Vielka Arias, Melanie Vargas	4:09.81	

=== 5000 metres walk ===
22 July

Rank	Name	Nationality	Time	Notes
1	María Fernanda Peinado	Guatemala	23:22.65	
2	Glendy Teletor	Guatemala	24:00.01	

=== High jump ===
21 July

Rank	Name	Nationality	1.60	1.65	1.70	1.73	1.78	1.83	1.88	Result	Notes
1	Jenna Rogers	United States	–	–	–	o	o	xo	xxx	1.83	
2	María José Rodriguez	Costa Rica	o	o	o	xxx				1.70	

=== Pole vault ===
21 July

Rank	Name	Nationality	3.25	3.35	3.55	3.75	3.95	4.05	4.15	4.25	4.41	4.51	Result	Notes
1st place, gold medalist(s)	Sydney Horn	United States	–	–	–	–	–	xo	xo	xxo	xxx	4.41	CR	
2nd place, silver medalist(s)	Heather Abadie	Canada	–	–	–	–	xo	xxx				3.95		
3rd place, bronze medalist(s)	Vielka Arias	Costa Rica	–	xo	o	xxx						3.55		
	Hana Moll	United States	–	–	–	–	–	–	xxx			NM		
	Andrea Paola Machuca	El Salvador	xxx									NM		

=== Long jump ===
22 July

Rank	Name	Nationality	#1	#2	#3	#4	#5	#6	Result	Notes
1st place, gold medalist(s)	Sophia Beckmon	United States	6.05	x	6.51	6.62w	6.69w	x	6.69	
2nd place, silver medalist(s)	Claire Bryant	United States	6.61	6.58	6.60	6.59w	6.66w	6.62	6.66w	
3rd place, bronze medalist(s)	Hayla González	Cuba	x	6.41w	x	x	6.36w	5.03w	6.41w	
4	Kimberly Smith	British Virgin Islands	5.55	5.64w	5.94w	5.49	5.57w	x	5.94w	
5	Ashantae Graham	Cayman Islands	x	5.91	5.36w	5.29	5.56w	x	5.91	NR
6	Rebeca Barrientos	El Salvador	5.62w	x	5.73	5.73	5.56w	5.58	5.73	PB
7	Danisha Chimilio	Guatemala	5.57w	5.55w	5.68	5.34	x	5.55w	5.68	PB
8	Raisa Thunig	Dominican Republic	x	x	5.51w	5.54w	5.48w	5.15w	5.54w	
9	Tiphanny Madrigal	Costa Rica	5.01w	4.84w	4.78				5.01w	

=== Triple jump ===
23 July

Rank	Name	Nationality	#1	#2	#3	#4	#5	#6	Result	Notes
1st place, gold medalist(s)	Rhianna Phipps	Jamaica	13.06	13.27	13.61	13.35	13.33	11.51	13.61	PB
2nd place, silver medalist(s)	Euphenie Andre	United States	13.42w	x	x	13.12	x	13.17	13.42w	
3rd place, bronze medalist(s)	Asherah Collins	United States	12.80	12.51	13.04	12.72	12.85	12.79	13.04	
4	Danisha Chimilio	Guatemala	x	11.84	x	x	11.76	11.98	11.98	
5	Rebeca Barrientos	El Salvador	x	x	x	11.94	11.83	11.86	11.94	
6	Tiphanny Madrigal	Costa Rica	x	x	11.03	x	x	x	11.03	

=== Shot put ===
21 July

Rank	Name	Nationality	#1	#2	#3	#4	#5	#6	Result	Notes
1st place, gold medalist(s)	Jaida Ross	United States	18.10	17.78	17.92	17.85	x	18.35	18.35	
2nd place, silver medalist(s)	Jalani Davis	United States	17.20	x	x	x	x	x	17.20	
3rd place, bronze medalist(s)	Danielle Sloley	Jamaica	15.42	x	15.45	16.23	15.04	15.82	16.23	
4	Mia Sylvester	Belize	12.62	x	13.02	13.78	13.69	14.46	14.46	
5	Shanice Hutson	Barbados	x	13.54	14.00	13.52	13.63	x	14.00	
6	Alejandra Rosales	El Salvador	10.76	12.22	11.92	11.48	x	x	12.22	

=== Discus throw ===
21 July

Rank	Name	Nationality	#1	#2	#3	#4	#5	#6	Result	Notes
1st place, gold medalist(s)	Melany Matheus	Cuba	59.60	x	51.48	52.07	54.92	54.63	59.60	
2nd place, silver medalist(s)	Shelby Frank	United States	x	53.63	53.22	54.06	53.53	56.96	56.96	
3rd place, bronze medalist(s)	Michaelle Valentin	Haiti	50.42	x	x	45.02	48.26	51.62	51.62	
4	Damali Williams	Jamaica	46.81	47.52	x	49.11	47.63	48.31	49.11	
5	Shakera Kirk	Trinidad and Tobago	44.60	x	44.95	44.87	34.88	44.91	44.95	
6	Lalenii Grant	Trinidad and Tobago	x	x	42.30	41.81	43.12	44.37	44.37	
7	Shanice Hutson	Barbados	42.54	41.78	42.25	39.93	x	42.64	42.64	
8	Alejandra Rosales	El Salvador	41.12	40.53	37.66	x	39.62	40.73	41.12	
9	Mia Sylvester	Belize	36.63	x	37.45				37.45	
10	Yanelli Dawkins	Cayman Islands	33.63	35.50	x				35.50	
	Brianna Smith	Cayman Islands	x	x	x				NM	
	Corinne Jemison	United States	x	x	x				NM	
	Cedricka Williams	Jamaica							DNS	

=== Hammer throw ===
22 July

Rank	Name	Nationality	#1	#2	#3	#4	#5	#6	Result	Notes
1st place, gold medalist(s)	Jalani Davis	United States	x	60.82	x	x	63.81	x	63.81	
2nd place, silver medalist(s)	Yanielys Torres	Puerto Rico	55.36	56.79	x	57.45	58.81	x	58.81	
3rd place, bronze medalist(s)	Michaelle Valentin	Haiti	57.51	55.58	x	x	x	x	57.51	
4	Sophie Pérez	Guatemala	x	57.39	54.06	x	56.04	54.11	57.39	

=== Javelin throw ===
22 July

Rank	Name	Nationality	#1	#2	#3	#4	#5	#6	Result	Notes
1st place, gold medalist(s)	Rhema Otabor	Bahamas	54.14	53.61	57.48	55.23	55.90	x	57.48	CR
2nd place, silver medalist(s)	Maura Huwalt	United States	49.25	45.54	x	46.22	46.62	46.14	49.25	
3rd place, bronze medalist(s)	Kimberly Smith	British Virgin Islands	37.54	x	34.89	x	–	–	37.54	

=== Heptathlon ===
21–22 July

The highest mark recorded in each event is highlighted in yellow

Rank	Name	Nationality	100m H	HJ	SP	200m	LJ	JT	800m	Points	Notes
1	Jadin O'Brien	United States	13.90	1.68	13.75	24.42w	5.81	38.02	2:20.52	5778	
2	Shaunece Miller	Bahamas	15.34	1.62	8.02	26.17w	5.15	19.83	2:32.26	4291	

== Mixed results ==
=== 4 × 400 metres relay ===
21 July

Rank	Lane	Nation	Competitors	Time	Notes
1st place, gold medalist(s)	5	United States	Caleb Cavanaugh, Kiah Williams, Will Sumner, Bailey Lear	3:14.71	CR
2nd place, silver medalist(s)	4	Jamaica	Gregory Prince, Shaquena Foote, Enrique Webster, Garriel White	3:19.66	
3rd place, bronze medalist(s)	3	Canada	Abdullahi Hassan, Olivia Cooper, Leroy Russell, Cassandra Williamson	3:25.42	
4	6	Costa Rica	Gary Altamirano, Naydelin Calderón, Shamayl Kooper, Melanie Vargas	3:39.59	
