= 2022 World Athletics U20 Championships – Men's 400 metres =

Men's 400 metres at the 2022 World Athletics U20 Championships
- Venue: Estadio Olímpico Pascual Guerrero
- Dates: 2 August (heats); 3 August (semifinal); 4 August (final)
- Winning time: 45.28

Medalists
gold medal	Lythe Pillay	South Africa
silver medal	Steven McElroy	United States
bronze medal	Yusuf Ali Abbas	Bahrain

The men's 400 metres at the 2022 World Athletics U20 Championships was held at the Estadio Olímpico Pascual Guerrero in Cali, Colombia on 2, 3 and 4 August 2022.

== Records ==
U20 standing records prior to the 2022 World Athletics U20 Championships were as follows:

Record	Athlete & Nationality	Mark	Location	Date
World U20 Record	Steve Lewis (USA)	43.87	Seoul, South Korea	28 September 1988
Championship Record	Anthony Pesela (BOT)	44.58	Nairobi, Kenya	21 August 2021
World U20 Leading	Steven McElroy (USA)	44.93	Eugene, United States	25 June 2022

== Results ==
=== Round 1 ===
Round 1 took place on 2 August, with the 35 athletes involved being split into 5 heats, each of 7 athletes. The first 4 athletes in each heat ( Q ) and the next 4 fastest ( q ) qualified to the semi-final. The overall results were as follows:

Rank	Heat	Name	Nationality	Time	Note
1	2	Lythe Pillay	South Africa	46.02	Q, SB
2	2	Yusuf Ali Abbas	Bahrain	46.21	Q
3	2	Delano Kennedy	Jamaica	46.24	Q, PB
4	4	Steven McElroy	United States	46.38	Q
5	3	Tadeáš Plaček	Czech Republic	46.56	Q, PB
6	1	Ángel González	Spain	46.65	Q
7	3	Shaemar Uter	Jamaica	46.66	Q
8	5	Masataka Tomoda	Japan	46.68	Q
9	2	Elkanah Chemelili	Kenya	46.69	Q
10	2	Martin Kouyoumdjian	Chile	46.75	q, PB
11	5	Ashton Schwartzman	United States	46.76	Q
12	4	Christopher Morales-Williams	Canada	46.81	Q
13	4	Andreas Grimerud	Norway	46.85	Q
14	3	Markel Fernández	Spain	46.87	Q
15	1	Busang Kebinatshipi	Botswana	46.89	Q
16	4	Tjaart van der Walt	South Africa	47.00	Q
17	1	Vinivius Moura	Brazil	47.02	Q
18	5	Joshua Atkinson	Thailand	47.03	Q
19	3	Shion Arita	Japan	47.10 [.092]	Q
20	1	Tyler Floyd	Canada	47.10 [.094]	Q
21	5	Marko Orešković	Croatia	47.12	Q, PB
22	2	Cooper Sherman	Australia	47.16	q, PB
23	5	Lukas Krappe	Germany	47.25	q, PB
24	1	Lukas Sutkus	Lithuania	47.39	q, PB
25	5	Denis Toma	Romania	47.64	
26	1	Bamidele Ajayi	Nigeria	47.67	
27	4	Michal Haidelmeier	Czech Republic	47.70	
28	1	Remus Niculita	Romania	47.80	
29	3	Emmanuel Rwotomiya	Uganda	47.86	
30	5	Luca Sito	Italy	48.03	
31	2	Amal Glasgow	Saint Vincent and the Grenadines	48.26	
32	3	Lex Revell-Lewis	New Zealand	48.66	
33	4	Tumiso Gabonamong	Botswana	48.72	
34	3	João Ribeiro Barros	Brazil	48.73	
	4	Joshua Mpanza	Zambia	DQ	

=== Semi-final ===
The semi-final took place on 3 August, with the 24 athletes involved being split into 3 heats of 8 athletes each. The first 2 athletes in each heat ( Q ) and the next 2 fastest ( q ) qualified to the final. The overall results were as follows:

Rank	Heat	Name	Nationality	Time	Note
1	2	Delano Kennedy	Jamaica	45.49	Q, PB
2	3	Lythe Pillay	South Africa	45.61	Q, SB
3	1	Steven McElroy	United States	45.67	Q
4	2	Busang Kebinatshipi	Botswana	45.91	Q
5	1	Shaemar Uter	Jamaica	45.96	Q, PB
6	3	Joshua Atkinson	Thailand	46.13	Q, NU20R
7	1	Yusuf Ali Abbas	Bahrain	46.21	q
8	2	Tyler Floyd	Canada	46.22	q, PB
9	2	Christopher Morales-Williams	Canada	46.27	PB
10	2	Ashton Schwartzman	United States	46.50	
11	3	Andreas Grimerud	Norway	46.54	
12	3	Masataka Tomoda	Japan	46.62	
13	2	Tadeáš Plaček	Czech Republic	46.63	
14	1	Martin Kouyoumdjian	Chile	46.69	PB
15	1	Ángel González	Spain	46.81	
16	1	Markel Fernández	Spain	46.88	
17	3	Cooper Sherman	Australia	46.94	PB
18	2	Vinicius Moura	Brazil	47.00	
19	1	Marko Orešković	Croatia	47.51	
20	3	Lukas Sutkus	Lithuania	47.55	
21	3	Tjaart van der Walt	South Africa	47.69	
22	3	Shion Arita	Japan	47.97	
23	1	Elkanah Chemelili	Kenya	48.03	
24	2	Lukas Krappe	Germany	48.10	

=== Final ===
The final was started at 18:00 on 4 August. The results were as follows:

Rank	Lane	Name	Nationality	Time	Note
1st place, gold medalist(s)	5	Lythe Pillay	South Africa	45.28	PB
2nd place, silver medalist(s)	4	Steven McElroy	United States	45.65	
3rd place, bronze medalist(s)	1	Yusuf Ali Abbas	Bahrain	45.80	PB
4	2	Tyler Floyd	Canada	46.01	PB
5	7	Joshua Atkinson	Thailand	46.31	
6	8	Shaemar Uter	Jamaica	46.36	
	3	Busang Kebinatshipi	Botswana	DQ	
	6	Delano Kennedy	Jamaica	DQ	
