= David García (sprinter) =

Spanish athlete

Personal information
- Nationality: Spanish
- Born: David García Zurita; 6 June 2005 (age 21)

Sport
- Sport: Athletics
- Event: Sprint

Achievements and titles
- Personal bests: 400 m: 45.43 (Bergen, 2024)
Medal record
Men's athletics
Representing Spain
World Indoor Championships
Silver medal – second place	2026 Toruń	4 × 400 m mixed
European U23 Championships
Gold medal – first place	2025 Bergen	4 × 400 m relay
European U18 Championships
Gold medal – first place	2022 Jerusalem	400 m

David García Zurita (born 6 June 2005) is a Spanish sprinter who predominantly competes over 400 metres. He ran for Spain at the 2024 Olympic Games and won a silver medal at the 2026 World Athletics Indoor Championships in the mixed 4 × 400 metres relay.

== Biography ==
He was born in Alcorcón but grew up in Badajoz. He is a member of Club Atletismo Badajoz. He won the Spanish under-18 titles over 400 metres in 2021 and 2022. He won the 400 metres at the 2022 European Athletics U18 Championships in Jerusalem, Israel in a time of 46.67 seconds. He was a member of the Spanish team which ultimately ran to a fourth overall finish at the 2022 World Athletics U20 Championships in Cali, Colombia in the Men's 4 × 400 metres relay.

He was a member of the Spanish team which placed fifth overall at the 2023 European Athletics Indoor Championships in Istanbul, in the Men's 4 × 400 metres relay alongside Óscar Husillos, Lucas Búa, and Markel Fernández. He placed fifth over 400 metres at the 2023 European Athletics U20 Championships.

He competed as part of the Spanish mixed 4 × 400 m relay team at the World Relays in Nassau, The Bahamas. He was a member of the Spanish team which placed fourth overall at the 2024 European Athletics Championships in Rome, in the Men's 4 × 400 metres relay. He also ran in the men's 4 × 400 m relay at the 2024 Olympic Games in Paris.

He ran for Spain at the 2025 World Athletics Relays in China in the Mixed 4 × 400 metres relay in May 2025, as he, Carmen Avilés, Samuel García and Blanca Hervás secured qualification for the 2025 World Championships. He competed at the 2025 European Athletics U23 Championships in Bergen, Norway, setting a personal best of 45.77 for the 400 metres in the preliminary round. He ran a new personal best 45.43 seconds to place fourth in the final. Later in the championships, he ran as part of the gold medal winning Spanish 4 × 400 metres relay team.

Garcia was second to Markel Fernandez in the 400 metres at the 2026 Spanish Indoor Championships in Valencia, running 46.96 seconds in the final. He reached the semi-finals of the 400 metres at the 2026 World Athletics Indoor Championships in Toruń, Poland. Also at the championships, Garcia won a silver medal in the mixed 4 × 400 metres relay alongside Markel Fernández, Blanca Hervás and Paula Sevilla.

Competing at the 2026 World Athletics Relays in Botswana, he was part of the Spanish mixed 4 x 400 metres relay team which set a national record of 3:09.89 on the opening day. In August 2026, he competed in the men's 4 × 400 metres relay at the 2026 European Athletics Championships in Birmingham, England.
