= Malik Skupin-Alfa =

German athlete (born 2004)

Personal information
- Nationality: German
- Born: 18 June 2004 (age 22)

Sport
- Sport: Athletics
- Event(s): 400 m, 800 m

Achievements and titles
- Personal best(s): 400 m: 47.10 (Gottingen, 2023); 800 m: 1:45.95 (Dortmund, 2026)
Medal record
Men's athletics
Representing Germany
European U23 Championships
Bronze medal – third place	2025 Bergen	4 × 400 m relay
European U20 Championships
Silver medal – second place	2023 Jerusalem	4 × 400 m relay
Bronze medal – third place	2021 Jerusalem	4 × 100 m relay

Malik Skupin-Alfa (born 18 June 2004) is a German sprinter and middle-distance runner. He won a bronze medal in the 4 × 400 metres relay at the 2025 European Athletics U23 Championships, having previously also won relay medals at the European U20 Championships.

== Biography ==
From Offenburg and a member of LG Offenburg, he has three siblings who also compete in athletics including his brother Milo and younger siblings Vanda and Magnus. He also took part in gymnastics, handball, and basketball alongside track and field during his childhood and wa coached by his mother Natalie Glock. Skupin-Alfa won a bronze medal in the 4 × 100 metres relay at the 2021 European U20 Championships in Tallinn, Estonia.

On February 26, 2023, he placed second at the German Youth Indoor Championships in Dortmund in the 800 metres. Skupin-Alfa won a silver medal in the 4 × 400 metres relay at the 2023 European U20 Championships in Jerusalem, Israel.

He relocated to Frankfurt in 2024 to train under Georg Schmidt, and ranked second in Germany for the 800 metres behind Robert Farken that year. He won bronze at the German Indoor Championships in his first year as a senior athlete, finishing behind Alexander Stepanov. Competing outdoors, he had a second-place finish at the U23 German Championships and a fifth-place finish at the senior German Championships. Later that summer, he had a breakthrough in Dresden, where Skupin-Alfa broke the 1:46 barrier for the first time in the 800 m with 1:45.81, and less than a week later, in Pfungstadt, he broke the 30-year-old German record in the 600 metres, running a time of 1:15.04 to replace the previous best set by Edgar Itt.

In February 2025, he placed third in 1:49.34 in the 800 metres at the German Indoor Championships in Dortmund. Skupin-Alfa won a bronze medal in the 4 × 400 metres relay at the 2025 European Athletics U23 Championships.

On 8 February 2026 at the Sparkassen Indoor Meeting Dortmund, a World Athletics Indoor Tour Bronze meeting, he placed second to Pole Maciej Wyderka in a lifetime best of 1:45.95. On 13 February, he competed in the 800 m at the Erfurt Indoor 2026, a World Athletics Indoor Tour Challenger meeting, winning the 'B' race in 1:46.19. In March 2026, he was selected for the 2026 World Athletics Indoor Championships in Poland and placed fifth in his heat in a time of 1:46.60, missing out on a non-automatic qualifier spot by two hundredths of a second.
