= Abdullahi Hassan =

Canadian middle-distance runner (born 2002)

Personal information
- Born: July 28, 2002 (age 24) Toronto, Ontario, Canada
- Education: Birchmount Park Collegiate Institute

Sport
- Country: Canada
- Sport: Track and field
- Event: 800 m
- University team: Wisconsin Badgers

Achievements and titles
- Personal bests: Outdoor; 400 m: 46.83 (Guelph 2019); 800 m: 1:45.39 (Gainesville 2025); 1500 m: 3:43.85 (Azusa 2023); Indoor; 600 m: 1:16.17 (Iowa City 2022); 800 m: 1:46.61 (Chicago 2024)
Medal record
Track and field
Representing Canada
NACAC U23 Championships
Bronze medal – third place	San José 2023	4 × 400 m mixed
NACAC U18 Championships
Gold medal – first place	Querétaro 2019	800 m
Bronze medal – third place	Querétaro 2019	4 × 400 m mixed

Abdullahi Hassan (born July 28, 2002) is a Canadian middle-distance runner who competes in the 800 m. Since 2021, he has competed collegiately for the Wisconsin Badgers. He represented Canada at the 2023 World Athletics Championships in Budapest.

== Athletics career ==
=== High School ===
Hassan was a standout runner all four years of high school, attending Birchmount Park Collegiate Institute in Toronto and competing on the club level for the Phoenix Athletics Association.

=== 2017-18 ===
His grade 9 year, he placed first at the OFSAA Championships in the 800 m and won the Canadian U16 title later that summer. The following year, he placed first at OFSAAs in both the 400 m and 800 m, and clocked a personal best of 1:51.86 in late July.

=== 2019 ===
Competing at 2019 New Balance Indoor Nationals in New York City, Hassan took first place in the 800 m in a time of 1:51.91. At OFSAAs in June, he would once again win the 800 m title and placed second over 400 m, running a personal best of 46.83.

The following month, Hassan made his international debut, representing Canada at the NACAC U18 Championships in Queretaro, Mexico. In the 800 m, Hassan won gold in a time of 1:52.48. Competing as part of Canada's 4 × 400 m mixed relay team, he won a bronze medal.

Still just 17 years old, Hassan competed at the Canadian Track and Field Championships in the senior division. He not only qualified for the final, but placed third behind Marco Arop and Brandon McBride. In the process he set a new Canadian U18 record in a time of 1:47.59.

=== Wisconsin Badgers ===
After only competing sparsely in 2020 due to the COVID-19 pandemic, Hassan enrolled at the University of Wisconsin–Madison, to compete for the Wisconsin Badgers track and field team.

=== 2021 ===
In his first season of collegiate competition, Hassan qualified for both the NCAA Indoor and Outdoor Championships, but failed to make the final on both occasions. On July 18, competing at the Sound Running Sunset Tour in Mission Viejo, California, Hassan took first, running a personal best of 1:46.16. The mark was just 0.09 seconds off Brandon McBride's Canadian U20 record of 1:46.09, putting Hassan second on the all-time list.

In August, Hassan competed in the 800 m at the World Athletics U20 Championships in Nairobi. After advancing through the first round with a mark of 1:49.09 and through the semi-final with a time of 1:46.89, Hassan competed in the final, placing seventh in 1:50.07.

=== 2022 ===
Competing at the 2022 NCAA Indoor Championships, Hassan contested the DMR alongside Wisconsin teammates Adam Spencer, David Wenthe, and Jackson Sharp. Together they placed third in a time of 9:25.78.

On May 15, Hassan won his first conference title, winning the 800 m at the Big 10 Outdoor Championships in 1:49.12. In June, At the NCAA Outdoor Championships, Hassan once again missed out on the final, placing eighth in his semi-final heat. Later that month, he placed fourth at the Canadian Track and Field Championships, running 1:47.16.

=== 2023 ===
At the 2023 NCAA Indoor Championships, Hassan once again competed as part of Wisconsin's DMR team, replicating their performance from the year prior as well, placing third. At the NCAA Outdoor Championships, Hassan qualified for his first national final, placing fourth in 1:46.30.

Selected to represent Canada at the NACAC U23 Championships in San José, Costa Rica taking place in July, he placed fourth in the 800 m final on July 23. Competing as part of Canada's 4 x 400 team he placed fourth and as part of the mixed 4 x 400, he earned a bronze medal. Just a few days later, Hassan competed at the Canadian Championships in Langley, British Columbia, where he placed second in 1:46.93.

Having been sufficiently high-enough on the world ranking list, Hassan was selected to represent Canada in the 800 m at the World Championships in Budapest. Making his world championship debut, he finished fifth in his first round heat in 1:46.33, less than two-tenths of a second off of his lifetime best, but not enough to advance to the next round. Following the competition, he noted that "[I] had never been to a competition like this or a stadium this big" and that fellow Canadian Marco Arop told him to "take in the moment and experience".

=== 2024 ===
Hassan opened his 2024 season with an indoor 800 m personal best of 1:46.61 to take the win at the Badgers Windy City Invite in Chicago, breaking the Wisconsin school record in the process. At the NCAA Indoor Championships in Boston, he contested just the individual 800 m, qualifying for final and taking eighth place.

=== 2025 ===
Hassan transferred to the Mississippi State Bulldogs track and field team for the 2025 season.

== Personal life ==
Hassan is of Somalian descent through his parents.

== Competition record ==
Representing Canada
Year	Competition	Venue	Position	Event	Time
2019	NACAC U18 Championships	Queretaro, Mexico	1st	800 m	1:52.48
2019	NACAC U18 Championships	Queretaro, Mexico	3rd	4 × 400 m mixed relay	3:29.86
2021	World U20 Championships	Nairobi, Kenya	7th	800 m	1:50.07
2023	NACAC U23 Championships	San José, Costa Rica	7th	800 m	1:47.63
2023	NACAC U23 Championships	San José, Costa Rica	4th	4 × 400 m relay	3:06.37
2023	NACAC U23 Championships	San José, Costa Rica	3rd	4 × 400 m mixed relay	3:25.42
2023	World Championships	Budapest, Hungary	22nd (h)	800 m	1:46.33
2025	World Championships	Tokyo, Japan	53rd (h)	800 m	1:47.50
2026	Pan American Championships	Medellín, Colombia	2nd	800 m	1:45.17
2026	Commonwealth Games	Glasgow, United Kingdom	11th (sf)	800 m	1:45.77
