= Christopher Morales Williams =

Canadian sprinter

Personal information
- Born: 5 August 2004 (age 22) Vaughan, Ontario, Canada
- Height: 5 ft 10 in (178 cm)

Sport
- Sport: Track and field
- Position: Sprinting
- Event: 400 metres
- University team: Georgia Bulldogs

Achievements and titles
- Personal bests: Outdoor; 200 metres: 20.93 (Coral Gables 2024); 400 metres: 44.05 (Gainesville 2024) NR; Indoor; 300 metres: 32.47 NR (Clemson 2024); 400 metres: 44.49 (Fayetteville 2024)
Medal record
World Indoor Championships
| Gold medal – first place | 2026 Toruń | 400 m |
World U20 Championships
| Bronze medal – third place | 2022 Cali | 4 × 400 metres relay |
Pan Am U20 Championships
| Silver medal – second place | 2023 Mayagüez | 400 m |

Christopher Morales Williams (born 5 August 2004) is a Canadian sprinter who specializes in the 400 metres. Since 2022, he has competed for the University of Georgia Bulldogs. On February 24, 2024, as a sophomore, he set an unofficial world indoor record in the 400 m of 44.49 at the SEC Championships held in Fayetteville. He then set a new Canadian record in the 400 m at the 2024 Outdoor SEC Championships on May 11 with a time of 44.05.

== Early and personal life ==
Morales-Williams was born in Vaughan, Ontario to Raul Morales and Tania Morales Williams. He has two siblings: Nicolas and Alexandra.

He graduated from St. Elizabeth Catholic High School in 2022. He missed two years of high school track training and competition when schools were shut during the pandemic, substituting daily solo long-distance runs for training, working up to 12 kilometres.

He majors in Ecology at the University of Georgia.

== High school career ==
=== 2019 ===
Morales-Williams was the number one sprinter in his age group, training under coach Tony Sharpe with the Speed Academy Athletics Club. Representing St. Elizabeth, he won OFSAA freshman titles in the 200 and 400 metres, breaking the Canadian U16 record in the latter with 49.14 seconds. He also finished 7th in the 100 metres. Representing the Speed Academy at the Athletics Ontario U16 Provincial Championships, he won the 200 metres and 300 metres.

=== COVID years ===
Due to the COVID-19 pandemic, OFSAA was canceled in 2020 and 2021, and Morales-Williams was unable to train with the Speed Academy due to public health restrictions. He continued to train alone, going so far as to run miles in the snow, for which his father bought him winter spikes. Restrictions were eventually lifted and Morales-Williams returned to the Speed Academy; he finished third in the 200 metres and second in the 400 metres at the Athletics Ontario U20 championships, and won both events at the U18 championships.

=== 2022 ===
Morales-Williams entered his senior season as the number one ranked track recruit in Canada. After winning the 400 metres at the SPIRE Scholastic Showcase, he was named MileSplit's National Boys Performer of the Week, the first Canadian to do so. He went on to win the 400 metres at the Athletics Ontario Open Indoor Championships, as well as at the Nike Indoor Nationals.

With OFSAA returning in 2022, Morales-Williams swept the 100, 200 and 400 m at both the YRAA Championships and the OFSAA Central Region Qualifiers. He went on to win the 200 metres and 400 metres again at OFSAA, and finished second in the 100 metres. Two weeks later, Morales-Williams finished 7th in the 200 metres and 2nd in the 400 metres at the New Balance Outdoor Nationals. A week later, he won the U20 400 metres at the Canadian National Championships in a personal best time of 46.41 seconds, qualifying him for the 2022 World U20 Championships in Cali, Colombia; he also finished 2nd in the 200 metres. Before leaving for Cali, Morales-Williams committed to the University of Georgia.

In Cali, he ran a personal best of 46.27 in the semi-finals, finishing 9th and just missing out on the final. However, in the 4 × 400 metres relay, he won a bronze medal with his teammates.

== Collegiate career ==
=== Freshman year ===
Morales-Williams arrived at Georgia in January 2023 and began training under head coach Caryl Smith-Gilbert. In February, he clocked a personal best of 47.42 seconds in the indoor 400 metres. Weeks later, he ran 47.90 seconds at the SEC Indoor Championships and failed to qualify for the NCAA Indoor Championships individually. He qualified in the 4 × 400 metre relay, though, with Matthew Boling, Caleb Cavanaugh, and Will Sumner, and together they finished second.

Outdoors, Morales-Williams lowered his 400-metre personal best to 45.87 seconds at the SEC Championships, though he failed to make the final again. He made it as far as the NCAA East Preliminaries, where he was eliminated in the second round. However, he once qualified for the NCAA Championships in the 4 × 100 metre relay, where their team failed to finish, and the 4 × 400 metre relay, where they finished 7th overall.

For the summer, Morales-Williams returned to Canada to train under Sharpe. Despite still being a U20 athlete, Morales-Williams entered in the senior 400 metres at the 2023 Canadian Track and Field Championships, and he went on to win in a personal best of 45.48 seconds. He was named to the national team for the 2023 Pan American U20 Athletics Championships, where he won a silver medal behind countryman Will Floyd.

=== Sophomore year and breakthrough ===
Morales-Williams' sophomore year proved to be an immense breakthrough. In his season opener at the Clemson Invitational, he broke the Canadian record in the indoor 300 metres; 4 weeks later, on the same track, he broke the Canadian record in the indoor 400 metres as well, running a time of 45.39 seconds, over 2 seconds faster than his personal best from the previous year and even faster than his outdoor personal best.

Just two weeks later in Fayetteville, Arkansas, after running 45.58 seconds in his prelim, Morales-Williams broke the world indoor 400 metre record with 44.49 seconds, winning the SEC Indoor title in the process. He broke Kerron Clement's world official record of 44.57, and ran faster than Michael Norman's unratified mark of 44.52, who was also coached by Gilbert. Morales-Williams said he felt ill in the morning and threw up, which motivated him further. His time was never ratified as the world record, due to the meet not having the correct starting blocks.

Competing at the NCAA Indoor Championships in Boston, Morales-Williams took first place becoming the first Canadian to win an NCAA indoor 400 m title. He split a time of 20.99 through 200 m before finishing with an mark of 44.67, the seventh fastest indoor performance of all time.

On June 7 that year, Morales-Williams completed the event sweep by also winning the NCAA outdoor 400 m title in a time of 44.47.

== Professional career ==
On July 12, 2024, Morales-Williams announced he would forego the rest of this collegiate eligibility and that he had signed a professional contract with adidas. That same day, he made his Diamond League debut in Monaco. He stated that he planned to continue to train in Athens, Georgia to finish his degree.

== Competition record ==
=== International competitions ===
Representing Canada
| Year | Competition | Venue | Position | Event | Time |
|---|---|---|---|---|---|
| 2022 | World U20 Championships | Cali, Colombia | 9th (sf) | 400 m | 46.27 |
| 2022 | World U20 Championships | Cali, Colombia | 3rd | 4 × 400 m relay | 3:06.50 |
| 2023 | Pan American U20 Championships | Mayagüez, Puerto Rico | 2nd | 400 m | 46.34 |
| 2023 | Pan American U20 Championships | Mayagüez, Puerto Rico | 4th | 4 × 400 m relay | 3:12.32 |
| 2024 | Olympic Games | Paris, France | 21st (sf) | 400 m | 45.25 |
| 2025 | World Indoor Championships | Nanjing, China | 5th | 400 m | 46.71 |
| 2025 | World Championships | Tokyo, Japan | 33rd (h) | 400 m | 45.26 |
| 2026 | World Indoor Championships | Toruń, Poland | 1st | 400 m | 44.76 |
| 2026 | Commonwealth Games | Glasgow, United Kingdom | 12th (sf) | 400 m | 45.99 |
| 2026 | World Ultimate Championship | Budapest, Hungary | 9th | 400 m | 44.98 |

=== SEC and NCAA championships ===
Representing the Georgia Bulldogs
| Year | SEC indoor | | | NCAA indoor | | | SEC outdoor | | | NCAA outdoor | | |
|---|---|---|---|---|---|---|---|---|---|---|---|---|
| 2023 | 400 m | 49.90 | 27th (h) | 4 × 400 m relay | 3:03.10 | 3rd | 200 m | 20.98 | 16th (h) | 4 × 100 m | 38.62 | 8th (h) |
| 2023 | 400 m | 49.90 | 27th (h) | 4 × 400 m relay | 3:03.10 | 3rd | 400 m | 45.87 | 11th (h) | 4 × 100 m | 38.62 | 8th (h) |
| 2023 | 400 m | 49.90 | 27th (h) | 4 × 400 m relay | 3:03.10 | 3rd | 4 × 100 m | 38.87 | 3rd | 4 × 400 m | 3:03.22 | 7th |
| 2023 | 400 m | 49.90 | 27th (h) | 4 × 400 m relay | 3:03.10 | 3rd | 4 × 400 m | 2:59.63 | 3rd | 4 × 400 m | 3:03.22 | 7th |
| 2024 | 400 m | 44.49 | 1st | 400 m | 44.67 | 1st | 400 m | 44.05 | 1st | 400 m | 44.47 | 1st |
| 2024 | 4 × 400 m | 3:07.98 | 5th | 400 m | 44.67 | 1st | 4 × 100 m | 39.77 | 2nd | 4 × 400 m | 3:05.21 | 5th |
| 2024 | 4 × 400 m | 3:07.98 | 5th | 400 m | 44.67 | 1st | 4 × 400 m | 3:05.97 | 2nd | 4 × 400 m | 3:05.21 | 5th |
