= Ja'Qualon Scott =

American athlete (born 2001)

Personal information
- Nationality: American
- Born: 2 August 2001 (age 24)

Sport
- Sport: Track and Field
- Event: hurdles

Achievements and titles
- Personal best(s): 110m hurdles: 13.09 (2024); 400m hurdles: 48.29 (2025); Indoors; 60m hurdles: 7.51 (2025)

Ja'Qualon Scott (born 2 August 2001) is an American sprint hurdler who competes over 60 metres hurdles, 110 metres hurdles and 400 metres hurdles.

== Early life ==
He attended school in Fort Bend County, Texas at Hightower High School. Scott then attended Texas A&M Kingsville before attending Texas A&M University in College Station.

== Career ==
Scott was runner-up to Texas Aggies teammate Connor Schulman in the 60 metres hurdles at the 2024 SEC Indoor Championships. Competing in Eugene, Oregon, that summer, he finished third in the 110 metres hurdles and fourth in the 400 metres hurdles at the 2024 NCAA Outdoor Championships. He finished in fifth place at the 2024 United States Olympic trials later that month in June 2024, also in Eugene, Oregon, running a personal best 13.09 seconds for the 110 metres hurdles. It was reported to be the fastest ever fifth-place finish in a 110 hurdles race worldwide. He had finished second in his semi-final in a time of 13.23 seconds.

He reached the final of the 60 metres hurdles at the 2025 SEC Indoor Championships and the 2025 NCAA Indoor Championships, achieving a personal best time of 7.51 seconds in February 2025 in Texas.

He was runner-up to Ezekiel Nathaniel at the 2025 NCAA Outdoor Championships over 400 metres hurdles in Eugene, Oregon, with a personal best 48.29 seconds. His effort helped the Texas Aggies to a share of the overall team title. On 12 July 2025, he ran a wind-assisted 13.12 (+3.3) to win the 110 metres hurdles at the Ed Murphey Track Classic, a World Athletics Continental Tour Silver event, in Memphis, Tennessee.

He qualified for the final of the 110 metres hurdles at the 2025 USA Outdoor Track and Field Championships in Eugene, placing fifth overall.

In February 2026, he ran the 60 metres hurdles in 7.50 seconds to place second at the SEC Indoor Championships, finishing 0.02 seconds behind Ja'Kobe Tharp. In June, Scott qualified for the 2026 NCAA Outdoor Championships and was the fastest qualifier for the 400 metres hurdles final with 48.59 seconds, prior to placing second in the final behind Vance Nilsson with 48.82 seconds.
