= Raheem Hayles =

Jamaican athlete (born 2001)

Personal information
- Nationality: Jamaican
- Born: 9 March 2001 (age 25)
- Home town: Queens, New York

Sport
- Sport: Athletics
- Event: Sprint
- College team: Florida Gators; North Carolina A&T Aggies

Achievements and titles
- Personal bests: 200m: 20.71 (Columbia, 2023); 400m: 44.81 (Austin, 2023)
Medal record
Men's athletics
Representing Jamaica
World Indoor Championships
Bronze medal – third place	2026 Toruń	4 × 400 m relay
NACAC U23 Championships
Gold medal – first place	2023 San Jose	4x400m relay

Raheem Hayles (born 9 March 2001) is a Jamaican sprinter.

== Early life ==
He attended Springfield Gardens High School in Springfield Gardens, New York and North Carolina A&T University and the University of Florida.

== Career ==
He ran 45.22 seconds for the 400 metres to Jonah sixth at the NCAA final in Austin, Texas in June 2023, having run a 44.81 personal best in the heats. He was a gold medalist in the 4 × 400 m relay at the 2023 NACAC U23 Championships in San Salvador.

He finished fourth in the 400 metres at the Jamaican Olympic trials in June 2024. He competed in the mixed 4 x 400 metres relay at the 2024 Paris Olympics.

Hayles reached the semi-finals of the 400 metres at the 2026 World Athletics Indoor Championships in Toruń, Poland. At the championships, he also ran in the men's 4 x 400 metres with the team winning the bronze medal. In May, he ran at the 2026 World Athletics Relays in the men's 4 × 400 metres relay in Gaborone, Botswana.
