= 2025 European Athletics U23 Championships – Men's 4 × 400 metres relay =

Men's 4 × 400 metres relay at the 2025 European Athletics U23 Championships
- Venue: Fana Stadion
- Location: Bergen, Norway
- Dates: 20 July
- Competitors: 64 from 14 nations
- Winning time: 3:02.02 CR, EU23R

Medalists
gold medal	David Garcia; Ángel González; Markel Fernández; Gerson Pozo; Sergio Plata	Spain
silver medal	Felix Levasseur; Maxime Wassmer; Benoît Moudio Priso; Allan Lacroix; Nabil Tezkratt	France
bronze medal	Thorben Finke; Max Husemann; Lukas Krappe; Florian Kroll; Jan Busam; Maximilian Köhler; Lasse Schmitt; Malik Skupin-Alfa	Germany

The men's 4 × 400 metres relay event at the 2025 European Athletics U23 Championships was held in Bergen, Norway, at Fana Stadion on 20 July. Spain won the gold with a new European U23 and Championship record time of 3:02.02, followed by France (silver) and Germany (bronze).

== Records ==
Prior to the competition, the records were as follows:

Record	Nation	Time (s)	Location	Date
European U23 record	Russia (RUS)	3:02.13	Debrecen, Hungary	15 July 2007
Championship U23 record	Russia (RUS)	3:02.13	Debrecen, Hungary	15 July 2007

== Results ==
=== Heats ===
First 3 in each heat (Q) and the next 2 fastest (q) advanced to the final.

==== Heat 1 ====
Place	Nation	Athletes	Time	Notes
1	Romania	Alexandru Gabriel Vochin, Sorin Voinea, Denis Simon Toma, Mario Alexandru Dobrescu	3:06.29	Q, SB
2	Belgium	Jaron De Vriese, Nils Romswinkel, Tijs Bruyns, Tibo Malumgré	3:06.47	Q, SB
3	Germany	Jan Busam, Maximilian Köhler, Lasse Schmitt, Malik Skupin-Alfa	3:06.80	Q, SB
4	Hungary	Balázs Plisz, János Kubasi, Levente Nadj, Marcell Szilveszter	3:07.25	SB
5	Switzerland	Alex Dupinet, Manuel Gerber, Yannis Künzler, Michael Sorg	3:08.13	SB
6	Poland	Dawid Tatara, Wiktor Wróbel, Paweł Miezianko, Kacper Lewalski	3:09.30	SB
—	Turkey	Mustafa Çinpolat, Deniz Kaan Kartal, Abdulkeri̇m İran, İsmail Nezir	DQ	

==== Heat 2 ====
Place	Nation	Athletes	Time	Notes
1	Spain	Sergio Plata, Ángel González, Gerson Pozo, Markel Fernández	3:05.42	Q, SB
2	France	Nabil Tezkratt, Maxime Wassmer, Benoît Moudio Priso, Allan Lacroix	3:05.59	Q, SB
3	Netherlands	Daan Kneppers, Keenan Blake, Rens Altorf, Isaya Klein Ikkink	3:05.62	Q, SB
4	Italy	Federico Falsetti, Tommaso Boninti, Dario Bressanello, Luca Sito	3:06.04	q, SB
5	Ireland	Joe Doody, Callum Baird, David Mannion, Andrew Egan	3:06.65	q,SB
6	Norway	Herman Sandor Baranyi-Berge, Andreas Grimerud, Fredrik Haavardtun Gullachsen, Sindre Strønstad-Løseth	3:11.82	SB
—	Great Britain	Thomas Hockley, Brook Cronin, David Race, Harry Barton	DQ	

=== Final ===
Place	Nation	Athletes	Time	Notes
1st place, gold medalist(s)	David Garcia, Ángel González, Markel Fernández, Gerson Pozo	Spain	3:02.02	CR, EU23R
2nd place, silver medalist(s)	Felix Levasseur, Maxime Wassmer, Benoît Moudio Priso, Allan Lacroix	France	3:02.60	SB
3rd place, bronze medalist(s)	Thorben Finke, Max Husemann, Lukas Krappe, Florian Kroll	Germany	3:02.83	SB
4	Daan Kneppers, Isaya Klein Ikkink, Rens Altorf, Jonas Phijffers	Netherlands	3:02.89	NU23R
5	Andrew Egan, Callum Baird, Joe Doody, David Mannion	Ireland	3:06.31	NU23R
6	Damiano Dentato, Tommaso Boninti, Federico Falsetti, Luca Sito	Italy	3:06.91	
7	Alexandru Gabriel Vochin, Sorin Voinea, Denis Simon Toma, Mario Alexandru Dobrescu	Romania	3:07.33	
8	Jaron De Vriese, Nils Romswinkel, Tijs Bruyns, Tibo Malumgré	Belgium	3:08.47	
