= 2026 World Athletics Indoor Championships – Men's 400 metres =

Men's 400 metres at the 2026 World Athletics Indoor Championships
- Venue: Kujawsko-Pomorska Arena Toruń
- Location: Toruń, Poland
- Dates: 20 March (round 1 & semi-finals); 21 March (final)
- Winning time: 44.76 CR

Medalists
| gold medal | Christopher Morales Williams | Canada |
| silver medal | Khaleb McRae | United States |
| bronze medal | Jereem Richards | Trinidad and Tobago |

The men's 400 metres at the 2026 World Athletics Indoor Championships took place on the short track of the Kujawsko-Pomorska Arena Toruń in Toruń, Poland, on 20 and 21 March 2026. This was the 22nd time the event was contested at the World Athletics Indoor Championships. Athletes could qualify by achieving the entry standard or by their World Athletics Ranking in the event.

== Background ==
The men's 400 metres was contested 21 times before 2026, at every previous edition of the World Athletics Indoor Championships.

Records before the 2026 World Athletics Indoor Championships
| Record | Athlete (nation) | Time (s) | Location | Date |
|---|---|---|---|---|
| World record | Christopher Morales Williams (CAN) | 44.49 | Fayetteville, United States | 24 February 2024 |
| Championship record | Jereem Richards (TTO) | 45.00 | Belgrade, Serbia | 19 March 2022 |
| 2026 World Lead | Khaleb McCrae (USA) | 44.52 | Fayetteville, United States | 13 February 2026 |

== Qualification ==
For the men's 400 metres, the qualification period ran from 1 November 2025 until 8 March 2026. Athletes could qualify by achieving the entry standard of 45.80 s. Athletes could also qualify by virtue of their World Athletics Ranking for the event or by virtue of their World Athletics Indoor Tour wildcard. There is a target number of 30 athletes.

== Results ==
=== Round 1 ===
Round 1 was held on 20 March, starting at 12:01 (UTC+1) in the morning. First 2 of each heat (Q) plus 4 fastest times (q) qualify to the semi-finals.

==== Heat 1 ====
| Place | Lane | Athlete | Nation | Time | Notes |
|---|---|---|---|---|---|
| 1 | 5 | Matheus Lima | Brazil | 46.09 | Q |
| 2 | 6 | Jereem Richards | Trinidad and Tobago | 46.10 | Q |
| 3 | 4 | Ericsson Tavares | Portugal | 46.41 | q |
| 4 | 3 | Lovro Mesec Košir | Slovenia | 46.71 | |

==== Heat 2 ====
| Place | Lane | Athlete | Nation | Time | Notes |
|---|---|---|---|---|---|
| 1 | 6 | Chris Robinson | United States | 46.34 | Q |
| 2 | 5 | Raheem Hayles | Jamaica | 46.66 | Q |
| 3 | 4 | Árpád Kovács | Hungary | 46.77 | |
| 4 | 3 | Lex Revell-Lewis | New Zealand | 47.17 | NR |

==== Heat 3 ====
| Place | Lane | Athlete | Nation | Time | Notes |
|---|---|---|---|---|---|
| 1 | 4 | Omar Elkhatib | Portugal | 46.56 | Q |
| 2 | 3 | David Garcia | Spain | 46.91 | Q |
| 3 | 6 | Delano Kennedy | Jamaica | 47.02 | PB |
| | 5 | Muhammad Abdallah Kounta | France | DQ | |

==== Heat 4 ====
| Place | Lane | Athlete | Nation | Time | Notes |
|---|---|---|---|---|---|
| 1 | 6 | Tomáš Horák | Czech Republic | 45.89 | Q |
| 2 | 5 | Attila Molnár | Hungary | 45.93 | Q |
| 3 | 4 | Boško Kijanović | Serbia | 46.43 | q |
| 4 | 3 | Markel Fernández | Spain | 46.68 | q |

==== Heat 5 ====
| Place | Lane | Athlete | Nation | Time | Notes |
|---|---|---|---|---|---|
| 1 | 5 | Christopher Morales Williams | Canada | 45.51 | Q |
| 2 | 6 | Brian Onyari Tinega | Kenya | 46.21 | Q |
| 3 | 4 | Franko Burraj | Albania | 46.57 | q |
| 4 | 3 | Javier Gómez | Venezuela | 46.96 | NR |
| 5 | 2 | Omar Simpson | United States Virgin Islands | 48.95 | PB |

==== Heat 6 ====
| Place | Lane | Athlete | Nation | Time | Notes |
|---|---|---|---|---|---|
| 1 | 5 | Khaleb McRae | United States | 46.09 | Q |
| 2 | 3 | Elián Larregina | Argentina | 46.61 | Q |
| 3 | 6 | Kelvis Padrino | Venezuela | 46.70 | NR |
| 4 | 4 | Emerson Nascimento | Brazil | 47.41 | PB |
| 5 | 2 | Jovan Stojoski | North Macedonia | 47.93 | SB |

=== Semi-finals ===
The semi-finals were held on 20 March, starting at 20:44 (UTC+1) in the evening.

==== Heat 1 ====
| Place | Lane | Athlete | Nation | Time | Notes |
|---|---|---|---|---|---|
| 1 | 6 | Chris Robinson | United States | 45.66 | Q |
| 2 | 5 | Matheus Lima | Brazil | 45.71 | q, AR |
| 3 | 3 | Ericsson Tavares | Portugal | 46.15 | PB |
| 4 | 4 | David Garcia | Spain | 46.65 | |

==== Heat 2 ====
| Place | Lane | Athlete | Nation | Time | Notes |
|---|---|---|---|---|---|
| 1 | 6 | Christopher Morales Williams | Canada | 45.35 | Q |
| 2 | 4 | Brian Onyari Tinega | Kenya | 45.75 | q |
| 3 | 5 | Jereem Richards | Trinidad and Tobago | 45.87 | q |
| 4 | 3 | Markel Fernández | Spain | 46.72 | |

==== Heat 3 ====
| Place | Lane | Athlete | Nation | Time | Notes |
|---|---|---|---|---|---|
| 1 | 5 | Attila Molnár | Hungary | 45.81 | Q |
| 2 | 6 | Tomáš Horák | Czech Republic | 46.03 | q |
| 3 | 4 | Elián Larregina | Argentina | 46.93 | |
| 4 | 3 | Franko Burraj | Albania | 47.23 | |

==== Heat 4 ====
| Place | Lane | Athlete | Nation | Time | Notes |
|---|---|---|---|---|---|
| 1 | 6 | Khaleb McRae | United States | 45.39 | Q |
| 2 | 5 | Omar Elkhatib | Portugal | 46.51 | |
| 3 | 4 | Raheem Hayles | Jamaica | 46.87 | |
| 4 | 3 | Boško Kijanović | Serbia | 47.20 | |

=== Final ===
The final was held on 21 March, starting at 18:34 (UTC+1) in the evening.

| Place | Heat | Lane | Athlete | Nation | Time | Notes |
|---|---|---|---|---|---|---|
| 1st place, gold medalist(s) | 2 | 6 | Christopher Morales Williams | Canada | 44.76 | CR |
| 2nd place, silver medalist(s) | 2 | 5 | Khaleb McRae | United States | 45.03 | |
| 3rd place, bronze medalist(s) | 2 | 4 | Jereem Richards | Trinidad and Tobago | 45.39 | SB |
| 4 | 1 | 5 | Chris Robinson | United States | 45.55 | |
| 5 | 2 | 3 | Tomáš Horák | Czech Republic | 45.70 | |
| 6 | 1 | 6 | Attila Molnár | Hungary | 45.71 | |
| 7 | 1 | 4 | Matheus Lima | Brazil | 46.17 | |
| 8 | 1 | 3 | Brian Onyari Tinega | Kenya | 46.62 | |
