= Lythe Pillay =

South African sprinter

Lythe Pillay OLY
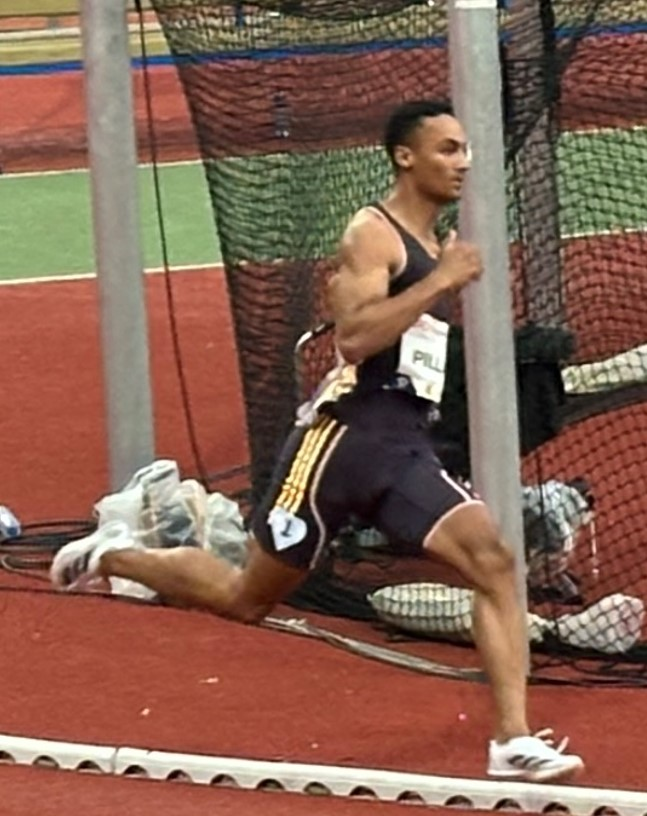
- Pillay during an event

Personal information
- Nationality: South African
- Born: 25 February 2003 (age 23) Benoni, South Africa

Sport
- Sport: Athletics
- Event: 400 metres

Achievements and titles
- Personal best: 400 m: 44.33 (Pietermaritzburg 2024)
Medal record
World Championships
Bronze medal – third place	2025 Tokyo	4 x 400 m relay
World Relays
Gold medal – first place	2025 Guangzhou	4×400 m relay
Silver medal – second place	2024 Nassau	4×400 m relay
Silver medal – second place	2026 Gaborone	4×400 m relay
World University Games
Gold medal – first place	2025 Bochum	400 m
Silver medal – second place	2025 Bochum	4×400 m relay mixed
World U20 Championships
Gold medal – first place	2022 Cali	400 m
African Youth Championships
Gold medal – first place	2019 Abidjan	400 m
Gold medal – first place	2019 Abidjan	Medley relay

Lythe Pillay OLY (born 25 February 2003) is a South African athlete, who specializes in the 400 metres. He won the gold medal in the men's 400m final at the World Athletics U20 Championships in Cali, Colombia. He competed in the men's 4 × 400 metres relay event at the 2020 Summer Olympics, and won his heat on 5 August at the 2024 Summer Olympics in Paris.
