= Gerson Pozo =

Spanish athlete

Personal information
- Nationality: Spanish
- Born: 6 May 2003 (age 23)

Sport
- Sport: Athletics
- Event: Sprint

Achievements and titles
- Personal best(s): 200m: 21.19 (2025); 400m: 45.79 (2025)
Medal record
Men's athletics
Representing Spain
European U23 Championships
Gold medal – first place	2025 Bergen	4x400 m relay
European U20 Championships
Bronze medal – third place	2019 Boras	4x400m relay

Gerson Pozo (born 6 May 2003) is a Spanish sprinter.

== Career ==
From Alcalá de Henares, Madrid, Pozo is a member of Ajalkalá Athletics Club. As a 16 year-old in Castellón in June 2019, he became Spanish U18 Champion in the 400 metres. That summer at the Iberian Under-18 Cup in Moratalaz he made his first international appearance, and set a new personal best for the 400 metres, crossing the finish line in 47.60 seconds. He subsequently won a bronze medal with the Spain 4 x 400 metres relay team at the 2019 European Athletics U20 Championships in Borås, Sweden.

As a 17-year-old, Pozo moved to second on the Spanish under-20 all-time indoor list in the 400 metres, with a time of 47.20 second to win the 2021 Spanish U20 Indoor Championships.

He was part of the Spanish 4 × 400 m relay team which set a new Spanish U20 record at the 2022 World Athletics U20 Championships in Cali, Colombia, and top European nation behind United States, Jamaica and Canada.

In February 2025, Pozo became U23 Spanish champion in the 400 meters with a time of 46.86 seconds. He broke the Madrid under-23 record in the 400m with a time of 46.29s at the senior Spanish Indoor Athletics Championships on 26 February 2025, placing fifth overall. Pozo competed for Spain at the 2025 World Athletics Relays in China in the Men's 4 × 400 metres relay in May 2025. He won a gold medal with the Spain 4 x 400 metres relay team at the 2025 European Athletics U23 Championships in Bergen, Norway. He also placed eighth overall in the individual 400 metres at the championships.

In March 2026, he was selected for the Spanish relay team for the 2026 World Athletics Indoor Championships in Poland.

== Personal life ==
Pozo is an evangelical Christian. He has tattoos of a wing on each of his ankles with the letters alpha and omega in Greek.
