= Joanne Reid (sprinter) =

Jamaican sprinter (born 2001)

Personal information
- Nationality: Jamaican
- Born: 25 December 2001 (age 24)

Sport
- Sport: Athletics
- Event: Sprint

Achievements and titles
- Personal bests: 200 m: 23.29 (Fayetteville, 2025); 400 m: 52.01 (Fayetteville, 2025)
Medal record
Women's athletics
Representing Jamaica
NACAC U23 Championships
Silver medal – second place	2023 San Jose	4 × 100 m
World U18 Championships
Silver medal – second place	2017 Nairobi	Mixed 4 × 400 m

Joanne Reid (born 25 December 2001) is a Jamaican sprinter.

== Early life ==
She attended St Jago High School in Spanish Town, Jamaica.

== Career ==
She was a silver medalist in the medley relay at the 2017 World Athletics U18 Championships in Nairobi. She was a silver medalist in the 200 metres at the 2019 CARIFTA Games.

Competing for the University of Arkansas, she set personal best times of 23.06 and 51.76 seconds for the indoor 200 and 400, respectively in 2023. She also ran a 50.52 relay split for Arkansas in the 2023 NCAA Indoor Championships.

She reached the final of the 400 metres at the 2023 Jamaican Athletics Championships. She was selected to compete for Jamaica at the 2023 NACAC Championships. She was a silver medalist in the women's 4 × 400 m relay at the Games.

In January 2025, she set a meeting record 52.01 for the 400 metres indoors at the Arkansas Invitational. She was named in the Jamaican team for the 2025 World Athletics Indoor Championships in Nanjing in March 2025. She reached the final of the 400 metres at the Jamaican Athletics Championships in June 2025.

Reid was named in the Jamaica team for the 2026 Central American and Caribbean Games.
