= Lukas Krappe =

German athlete (born 2003)

Personal information
- Nationality: German
- Born: 27 November 2003 (age 22)

Sport
- Sport: Athletics
- Event: 400 m

Achievements and titles
- Personal bests: 400 m: 46.01 (Dresden, 2025)
Medal record
Men's athletics
Representing Germany
European Championships
Bronze medal – third place	2024 Rome	4 × 400 m relay
European U23 Championships
Bronze medal – third place	2025 Bergen	4 × 400 m relay

Lukas Krappe (born 27 November 2003) is a German sprinter. He won a bronze medal in the 4 × 400 metres relay at the 2024 European Athletics Championships.

== Early life ==
From Berlin, he joined the SCC Berlin athletics club in 2018. He was also a member of the Degewo Junior Team. In 2023, he began a business law degree at the Berlin School of Economics and Law.

== Career ==
In 2020, as a 16 year-old he competed at the Berlin-Brandenburg Championships, where he improved his 400 metres personal best. to 50.33 seconds. With this time, he qualified for his first German Youth Championships where he finished second in the semi-finals with a new personal best of 50.13 seconds before breaking the 50-second mark for the first time finishing fifth in the final, in which crossed the finishing in a time 49.73 seconds.

He was runner-up at the German under-20 championships in the 400 metres race in 2022. He ran a personal best 47.25 seconds and reached the semi-finals at the 2022 World Athletics U20 Championships in Cali, Colombia in August 2022. He was runner-up at the German U23 Championships over 400 metres in Gottingen in July 2023, running 47.10 seconds. He competed for Germany at the 2023 European Athletics U23 Championships in Espoo, reaching the final of the 4 × 400 m relay.

In May 2024, he was selected for the 2024 European Athletics Championships taking place in Rome in June 2024. At the championships, he ran as part of the bronze-medal winning German 4 × 400 metres relay team. He was named as a travelling reserve for the relay pool at the 2024 Olympic Games in Paris.

He competed at the 2025 World Athletics Relays in China in the Men's 4 × 400 metres relay in May 2025.
