= Steven McElroy (athlete) =

American sprinter (born 2003)

Personal information
- Born: April 13, 2003 (age 23) Pickerington, Ohio, U.S.
- Height: 5 ft 9 in (175 cm)

Sport
- Country: United States
- Sport: Track and field
- Event: Sprint
- College team: University of Cincinnati; University of Arkansas
Medal record
Representing United States
Men's athletics
World U20 Championships
| Silver medal – second place | 2022 Cali | 400 m |

Steven McElroy (born April 14, 2003) is an American track and field athlete in 200 and 400 meter sprint. He currently competes at the collegiate level for the Arkansas Razorbacks and previously for the Cincinnati Bearcats. He competed in the 2022 World Athletics U20 Championships in Cali, Colombia, where he won the silver medal in the 400 meter event.

== Personal bests ==
- 200 meter – 20.65 (Fayetteville 2024)
- 400 meter – 44.93 (Eugene 2022)
