= Sam Blaskowski =

American sprinter (born 2000)

Personal information
- Nationality: United States
- Born: November 5, 2002 (age 23)

Sport
- Sport: Athletics
- Event: Sprint
- College team: Wisconsin–La Crosse

Achievements and titles
- Personal bests: 60m: 6.65 (Albuquerque, 2024); 100m: 9.89 (Cleveland, 2026); 200m: 19.93 (Winter Garden, 2026)

Sam Blaskowski (born November 5, 2002) is an American sprinter.

== Career ==
At the 2023 NCAA III Indoor National Championships, Blaskowki became the second sprinter in University of Wisconsin–La Crosse school history to win a national title in the 60-meter dash with a time of 6.71. He also finished second at the national championships in the 200-meters dash with a time of 20.67.

In 2024, Blaskowski took home two individual titles and a relay title at the NCAA III Outdoor National Championships, including the 4x100 relay in a time of 39.82, the 100-meter dash in 10.24, and the 200-meter dash in 20.63.

In May 2026, Blaskowski set a 100-meter time of 9.89 seconds at the Music City Track Carnival in Cleveland, Tennessee. Some fans dubbed Blaskowski the "fastest white man in history" after the event, as he beat 100-meter time of 9.92 seconds set by Christophe Lemaitre in 2011. However, that title was later taken by Lachlan Kennedy at the 2026 Commonwealth Games.

In August 2026, Blaskowski announced that he would transfer his allegiance to represent Poland.

In September 2026, social media posts containing racial slurs that Blaskowski shared during his high school years resurfaced online. Blaskowski later apologized for the posts and said they were made nearly seven years earlier, taking responsibility for what he had written and said. Following the controversy, he left Star Athletics, which said his departure was consistent with the organization's code of conduct.
