= Connor Schulman =

American athlete (born 2001)

Personal information
- Born: 2 July 2001 (age 24)

Sport
- Sport: Athletics
- Event: Hurdles

Achievements and titles
- Personal best(s): 60mH: 7.51 (Boston, 2026); 110mH: 13.33 (Austin, 2023)
Medal record
Men's athletics
Representing United States
NACAC U23 Championships
Gold medal – first place	2023 San Jose	110m hurdles

Connor Schulman (born 2 July 2001) is an American sprint hurdler. He won the gold medal at the NACAC U23 Championships in the 110 metres hurdles.

== Early life ==
He attended Rice High School in Altair, Texas where he competed in football, basketball, tennis and track and field. He graduated in 2019, going on to attend Texas A&M University in College Station, to study business and run track, turning down a Division III football scholarship offer.

== Career ==
In June 2023, Schulman ran a personal best for the 110 metres hurdles at the 2023 NCAA Outdoor Championships, running 13.33 seconds. Representing the United States, Schulman won the gold medal in the 110 metres hurdles at the 2023 NACAC U23 Championships in San Jose, Costa Rica, finishing ahead of Antoine Andrews of The Bahamas in 13.49 seconds.

Competing for Texas A&M University, in his senior year in 2024, Schulman beat Ja'Qualon Scott to win the men's 60m hurdles in 7.59 seconds, at the Southeastern Conference Indoor Championships in Arkansas, becoming the first SEC champion in program history for the Texas Aggies in the discipline. In March, he finished fifth in the 60 metres hurdles at the 2024 NCAA Indoor Championships.

Schulman was a finalist in the 60 metres hurdles at the 2025 USA Indoor Championships in New York in February. The following January, Schulman equalled his personal best with a time of 7.53 seconds for the 60 metres hurdles at the Corky Classic in Texas. On 24 January 2026, Schulman set a personal best in the 60m hurdles running 7.51 to place second to Trey Cunningham at the Indoor Grand Prix, Boston, in a field featuring 110m hurdles world champion Cordell Tinch. The following week, he placed second to Tinch at the Millrose Games in 7.57 seconds. He was a finalist in the 60 metres hurdles at the 2026 USA Indoor Track and Field Championships in New York. In May, he equalled his personal best 13.33 for the 110 metres hurdles at the Golden Grand Prix in Tokyo.
