= Will Sumner =

American athlete

Personal information
- Nationality: American
- Born: 22 October 2003 (age 22)

Sport
- Sport: Athletics
- Event: 800m

Achievements and titles
- Personal bests: 400m:: 45.42 (Memphis, 2025); 800m: 1:44.26 (Austin, 2023)
Medal record
Men's athletics
Representing United States
World U20 Championships
Gold medal – first place	2022 Cali	4x400 m mixed relay
Gold medal – first place	2022 Cali	4x400 m relay
NACAC U23 Championships
Gold medal – first place	2023 San Jose	Mixed 4x400 m relay

Will Sumner (born 22 October 2003) is an American middle-distance runner who specializes in the 800 metres. He competed for the Georgia Bulldogs before turning professional in 2023.

== Career ==
In high school, Sumner ran the third fastest ever 800 meter time outdoors in 1:46.53, as well as the second fastest ever indoors in 1:48.14. Sumner won the 800m race at the NCAA Championships in June 2023, running a personal best time of 1:44.26. This was also the second fastest freshman collegiate time ever, the fifth fastest overall in NCAA history, the second-fastest in meet history, breaking the stadium record set in 2019 by Bryce Hoppel and placed him third fastest in the world in the year. Competing at the 2023 USA Outdoor Track and Field Championships, in Eugene, Oregon, he reached the final of the 800m competition, where he finished fifth. was a gold medalist at the 2023 U23 NACAC Championships in San Jose, Costa Rica, in the mixed 4 × 400 m relay alongside Bailey Lear, Caleb Cavanaugh, and Kiah Williams.

In February 2025, he won the 600 metres at the Millrose Games in New York City in a meeting record time of 1:14.04. On 12 July 2025, he lowered his personal best to 45.42 seconds for the 400 metres at the Ed Murphey Track Classic, a World Athletics Continental Tour Silver event, in Memphis, Tennessee.

== Personal life ==
Sumner attended Woodstock High School in Georgia. His parents were also athletes, with father Brad and mother Tosha both being NCAA champions and multiple-time All-Americans. He has a sister called Brynne. He is a keen piano player.

== Sponsorship ==
In July 2023, Sumner announced that he was turning professional and had signed a sponsorship deal with Adidas.
