= European Athletics U23 Championships =

Biennial athletics competition

- Logo
- Status: active
- Genre: sports event
- Date: midyear
- Frequency: biennial
- Inaugurated: 1997
- Organiser: European Athletic Association
- Website: www.european-athletics.com/competitions/european-athletics-u23-championships/

The European Athletics U23 Championships is a biennial athletics competition for European athletes under the age of 23, which is organized by the European Athletic Association. The oldest of the 'age-group' track and field events held by European Athletics – European Athletics U20 Championships (previously called 'Junior Championships') are held in the same odd numbered years, while the European Athletics U18 Championships, previously the 'Youth Championships' are held in even numbered years.

The event was first held in 1997 and was a replacement for the European Athletics U23 Cup – a biennial event which had "A" and "B" level leagues that was held in 1992 and 1994. Historically, the event has been held in North-Eastern Europe in Nordic, Baltic or central Europe.

== Editions ==
=== European Athletics U23 Cup ===
Ed.	Year	Division	City	Country	Date	Men's winner	Women's winner
1	1992	A	Gateshead	Great Britain	18–19 July	Germany	Great Britain
1	1992	B	Villeneuve-d'Ascq	France	18–19 July	Czechoslovakia	France
2	1994	A	Ostrava	Czech Republic	30–31 July	Germany	Russia
2	1994	B	Lillehammer	Norway	30–31 July	Poland	Ukraine

=== European Athletics U23 Championships ===
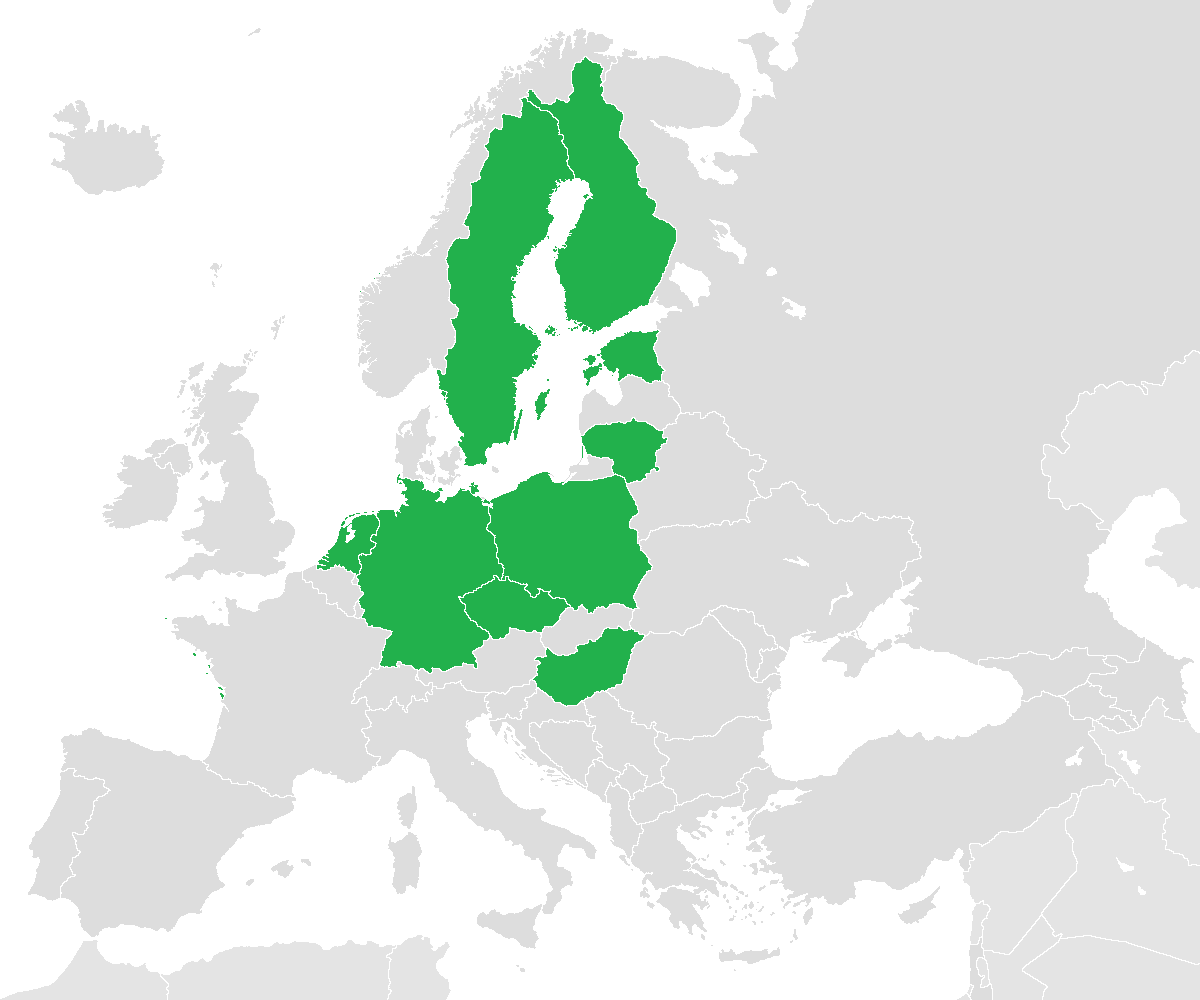
Hosts

Ed.	Year	Host city	Host country	Date	Venue	Events	Top of the medal table
1	1997	Turku	Finland	10–13 July	Paavo Nurmi Stadium	43	Russia
2	1999	Gothenburg	Sweden	29 July–1 August	Ullevi	43	Germany
3	2001	Amsterdam	Netherlands	12–15 July	Olympisch Stadion	44	Germany
4	2003	Bydgoszcz	Poland	17–20 July	Zdzisław Krzyszkowiak Stadium	44	Russia
5	2005	Erfurt	Germany	14–17 July	Steigerwaldstadion	44	Russia
6	2007	Debrecen	Hungary	12–15 July	Gyulai István Athletic Stadium	44	Russia
7	2009	Kaunas	Lithuania	16–19 July	S. Darius and S. Girėnas Stadium	44	Russia
8	2011	Ostrava	Czech Republic	14–17 July	Městský Stadion	44	Russia
9	2013	Tampere	Finland	11–14 July	Ratina Stadium	44	Russia
10	2015	Tallinn	Estonia	9–12 July	Kadriorg Stadium	44	Germany
11	2017	Bydgoszcz	Poland	13–16 July	Zdzisław Krzyszkowiak Stadium	44	Germany
12	2019	Gävle	Sweden	11–14 July	Gunder Hägg-stadion	44	Germany
13	2021	Tallinn	Estonia	8–11 July	Kadriorg Stadium	44	Italy
14	2023	Espoo	Finland	13–16 July	Leppävaara Stadium	44	Great Britain
15	2025	Bergen	Norway	17–20 July	Fana Stadion	44	Germany
16	2027	Bydgoszcz	Poland	22–25 July	Zdzisław Krzyszkowiak Stadium	44	

== Championships records ==
=== Men ===
Event	Record	Athlete	Nationality	Date	Meet	Place	Ref.
100 m	10.04 (+1.0 m/s)	Jeremiah Azu	Great Britain	13 July 2023	2023	Espoo, Finland	
200 m	20.33 (+1.6 m/s)	Ján Volko	Slovakia	15 July 2017	2017	Bydgoszcz, Poland	
400 m	44.82	Jonas Phijffers	Netherlands	19 July 2025	2025	Bergen, Norway	
800 m	1:44.06	Francesco Pernici	Italy	18 July 2025	2025	Bergen, Norway	
1500 m	3:38.94	Wolfram Müller	Germany	14 July 2001	2001	Amsterdam, Netherlands	
5000 m	13:20.16	Ali Kaya	Turkey	11 July 2015	2015	Tallinn, Estonia	
10,000 m	27:53.38	Ali Kaya	Turkey	9 July 2015	2015	Tallinn, Estonia	
110 m hurdles	13.22 (+0.3 m/s)	Sasha Zhoya	France	13 July 2023	2023	Espoo, Finland	
400 m hurdles	48.01	Owe Fischer-Breiholz	Germany	19 July 2025	2025	Bergen, Norway	
3000 m steeplechase	8:20.17	Maciej Megier	Poland	20 July 2025	2025	Bergen, Norway	
High jump	2.36 m	Aleksander Waleriańczyk	Poland	20 July 2003	2003	Bydgoszcz, Poland	
Pole vault	5.93 m	Romain Mesnil	France	1 August 1999	1999	Gothenburg, Sweden	
Long jump	8.37 m (+1.1 m/s)	Eusebio Cáceres	Spain	12 July 2013	2013	Tampere, Finland	
Triple jump	17.72 m (+1.3 m/s)	Sheryf El-Sheryf	Ukraine	17 July 2011	2011	Ostrava, Czech Republic	
Shot put	21.59 m	Konrad Bukowiecki	Poland	14 July 2017	2017	Bydgoszcz, Poland	
Discus throw	68.34 m	Mykolas Alekna	Lithuania	15 July 2023	2023	Espoo, Finland	
Hammer throw	80.88 m	Nicolas Figère	France	15 July 2001	2001	Amsterdam, Netherlands	
Javelin throw	84.97 m	Cyprian Mrzygłód	Poland	13 July 2019	2019	Gävle, Sweden	
Decathlon	8608 pts	Markus Rooth	Norway	15–16 July 2023	2023	Espoo, Finland	
Decathlon	100m (wind) / Long jump (wind) / Shot put / High jump / 400m / 110m H (wind) / Discus / Pole vault / Javelin / 1500m; 10.81 (+1.3 m/s) / 7.61 m (+3.6 m/s) / 15.31 m / 2.03 m / 49.05 / 14.43 (−1.2 m/s) / 48.63 m / 5.10 m / 63.71 m / 4:29.66						
20 km walk (road)	1:19:58	Aigars Fadejevs	Latvia	10 July 1997	1997	Turku, Finland	
4 × 100 m relay	38.43	Maxime Rebierre; Yoran Kabengele Kabala; Mohammed Badru; Jeff Erius	France	20 July 2025	2025	Bergen, Norway	
4 × 400 m relay	3:02.02	David Garcia; Ángel González; Markel Fernandez; Gerson Pozo	Spain	20 July 2025	2025	Bergen, Norway	

=== Decathlon disciplines best ===
Event	Record	Athlete	Nation	Date	Championships	Place	Ref.
100 m							
Long jump							
Shot put							
High jump							
400 m							
110 m hurdles							
Discus throw							
Pole vault							
Javelin throw							
1500 m							

=== Women ===
Event	Record	Athlete	Nationality	Date	Meet	Place	Ref.
100 m	11.03 (+1.5 m/s)	Maria Karastamáti	Greece	16 July 2005	2005	Erfurt, Germany	
200 m	22.57 (+1.7 m/s)	Hana Benesova	Czech Republic	13 July 1997	1997	Turku, Finland	
400 m	49.74	Henriette Jæger	Norway	19 July 2025	2025	Bergen, Norway	
800 m	1:57.42	Audrey Werro	Switzerland	19 July 2025	2025	Bergen, Norway	
1500 m	4:04.77	Amela Terzić	Serbia	12 July 2015	2015	Tallinn, Estonia	
5000 m	15:01.67	Yasemin Can	Turkey	16 July 2017	2017	Bydgoszcz, Poland	
10,000 m	31:39.34	Alina Reh	Germany	12 July 2019	2019	Gävle, Sweden	
100 m hurdles	12.68 (±0.0 m/s)	Ditaji Kambundji	Switzerland	15 July 2023	2023	Espoo, Finland	
400 m hurdles	54.04	Emily Newnham	Great Britain	19 July 2025	2025	Bergen, Norway	
3000 m steeplechase	9:26.98	Olivia Gürth	Germany	15 July 2023	2023	Espoo, Finland	
High jump	2.00 m	Yaroslava Mahuchikh	Ukraine	10 July 2021	2021	Tallinn, Estonia	
Pole vault	4.70 m	Angelina Zhuk-Krasnova	Russia	13 July 2013	2013	Tampere, Finland	
Long jump	7.05 m (+1.1 m/s)	Darya Klishina	Russia	17 July 2011	2011	Ostrava, Czech Republic	
Triple jump	14.70 m (+1.3 m/s)	Cristina Nicolau	Romania	1 August 1999	1999	Gothenburg, Sweden	
Shot put	19.73 m	Nadezhda Ostapchuk	Belarus	12 July 2001	2001	Amsterdam, Netherlands	
Discus throw	64.40 m	Kateryna Karsak	Ukraine	13 July 2007	2007	Debrecen, Hungary	
Hammer throw	73.71 m	Silja Kosonen	Finland	14 July 2023	2023	Espoo, Finland	
Javelin throw	65.60 m	Christin Hussong	Germany	11 July 2015	2015	Tallinn, Estonia	
Heptathlon	6563 pts NR	Saga Vanninen	Finland	19–20 July 2025	2025	Bergen, Norway	
Heptathlon	100m H (wind) / High jump / Shot put / 200m (wind) / Long jump (wind) / Javelin / 800m; 13.25 (+1.1 m/s) / 1.80 m / 15.09 m / 24.25 (−1.0 m/s) / 6.49 m (−0.3 m/s) / 43.74 m / 2:11.00						
20 km walk (road)	1:27:17	Mariya Ponomaryova	Russia	10 July 2015	2015	Tallinn, Estonia	
4 × 100 m relay	42.92	Nia Wedderburn-Goodison; Kissiwaa Mensah; Alyson Bell; Success Eduan	Great Britain	20 July 2025	2025	Bergen, Norway	
4 × 400 m relay	3:26.52	Rebecca Grieve; Emily Newnham; Poppy Malik; Yemi Mary John	Great Britain	20 July 2025	2025	Bergen, Norway	

== All-time medal table ==
Medal table includes 1997–2025 Championships.

Rank	Nation	Gold	Silver	Bronze	Total
1	Russia (RUS)	83	66	57	206
2	Germany (GER)	73	99	85	257
3	Great Britain (GBR)	68	62	48	178
4	Poland (POL)	53	42	48	143
5	France (FRA)	51	48	63	162
6	Spain (ESP)	34	34	39	107
7	Italy (ITA)	29	32	41	102
8	Ukraine (UKR)	25	40	30	95
9	Belarus (BLR)	22	21	20	63
10	Turkey (TUR)	21	14	6	41
11	Netherlands (NED)	20	17	19	56
12	Romania (ROU)	20	16	16	52
13	Finland (FIN)	13	18	27	58
14	Hungary (HUN)	13	14	12	39
15	Greece (GRE)	13	11	12	36
16	Norway (NOR)	13	7	10	30
17	Sweden (SWE)	12	17	21	50
18	Switzerland (SUI)	12	8	9	29
19	Czech Republic (CZE)	11	20	12	43
20	Latvia (LAT)	9	4	9	22
21	Belgium (BEL)	7	16	10	33
22	Lithuania (LTU)	6	5	5	16
23	Slovenia (SLO)	5	4	7	16
24	Denmark (DEN)	5	4	3	12
25	Serbia (SRB)	5	2	8	15
26	Croatia (CRO)	4	2	3	9
26	Slovakia (SVK)	4	2	3	9
28	Azerbaijan (AZE)	4	1	0	5
29	Portugal (POR)	3	6	7	16
30	Bulgaria (BUL)	3	5	2	10
31	Austria (AUT)	3	2	3	8
32	Ireland (IRL)	2	7	7	16
33	Estonia (EST)	2	5	4	11
34	Serbia and Montenegro (SCG)	2	2	1	5
35	Israel (ISR)	2	2	0	4
36	Cyprus (CYP)	2	0	2	4
–	Authorised Neutral Athletes (ANA)	2	0	2	4
37	Iceland (ISL)	1	1	2	4
38	Moldova (MDA)	1	1	1	3
39	Independent Athletes (EAA)	0	1	0	1
39	Luxembourg (LUX)	0	1	0	1
41	Andorra (AND)	0	0	1	1
41	Bosnia and Herzegovina (BIH)	0	0	1	1
41	Georgia (GEO)	0	0	1	1
41	Kosovo (KOS)	0	0	1	1
41	Montenegro (MNE)	0	0	1	1
Totals (45 entries)		658	659	659	1,976
