= Markel Fernández =

Spanish sprinter (born 2003)

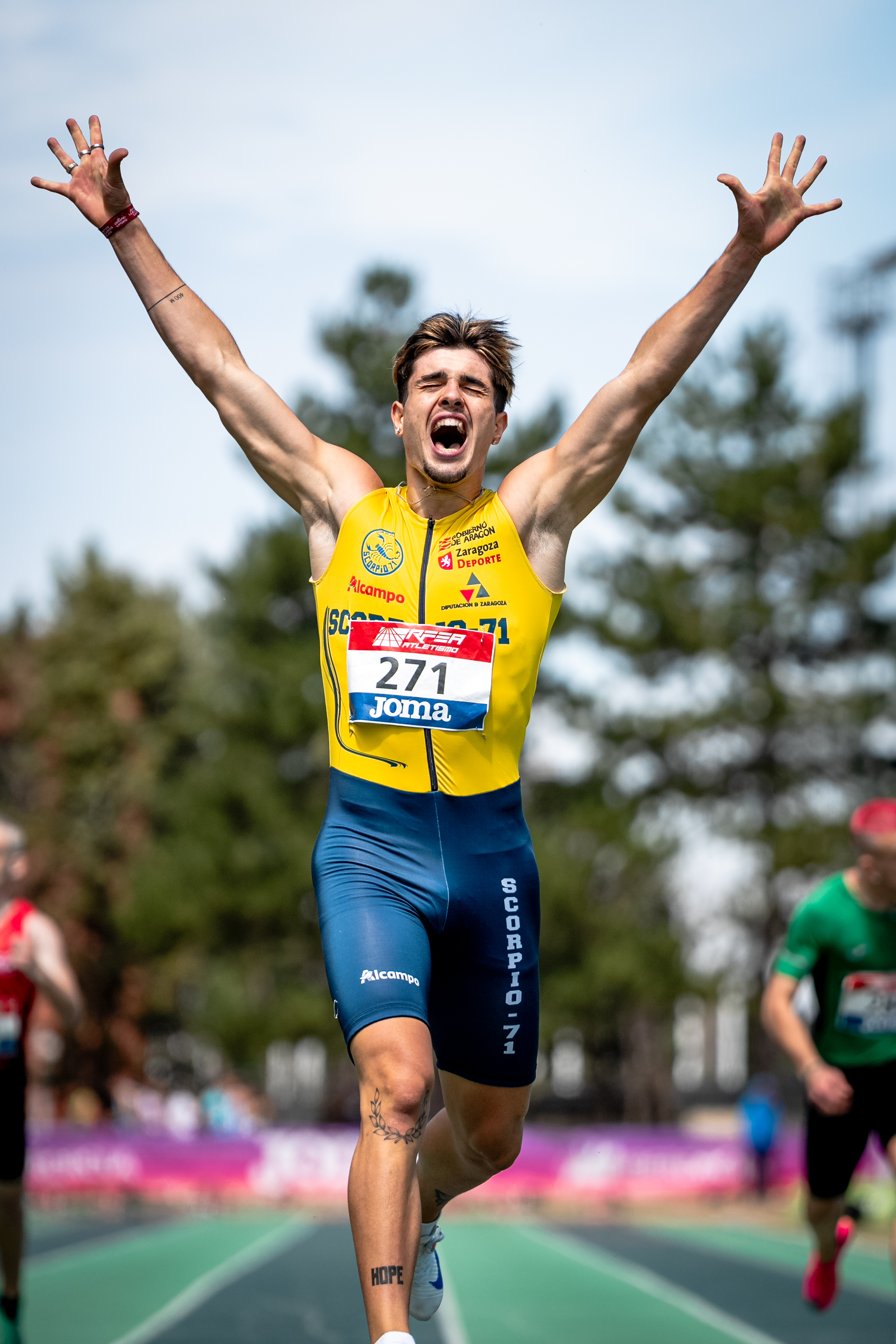

Personal information
- Full name: Markel Fernández Soto
- Born: 6 February 2003 (age 23) Sopela, Biscay

Sport
- Sport: Athletics
- Event: 400 m
- Club: FC Barcelona

Achievements and titles
- Personal best(s): 400m: 45.47 (Tarragona, 2025); Indoor; 400m: 45.95 (Salamanca, 2026)
Medal record
Men's athletics
Representing Spain
World Indoor Championships
Silver medal – second place	2026 Toruń	4 × 400 m mixed
European Indoor Championships
Silver medal – second place	2025 Apeldoorn	4 × 400 m relay
European U23 Championships
Gold medal – first place	2025 Bergen	4x400 m relay
Mediterranean U23 Indoor Championships
Gold medal – first place	2023 Valencia	400 m

Markel Fernández Soto (born 6 February 2003) is a Spanish sprinter. He won the 400 metres at the 2026 Spanish Indoor Athletics Championships. He was a silver medalist in the 4 x 400 metres relay at the 2025 European Athletics Indoor Championships and at the 2026 World Athletics Indoor Championships in the mixed 4 × 400 metres relay.

== Biography ==
Fernández is from Biscay, in the Basque Country. In 2021, was runner-up at the Spanish Athletics Championships in the 400 metres. He competed for Spain at the 2022 World Athletics U20 Championships in Cali, Colombia. At the Games, he was a member of the Spanish 4 × 400 m relay team which set a new Spanish U20 record.

His first senior international competition was the 2023 European Athletics Indoor Championships in Istanbul, where he finished fourth in the 4 × 400 metres relay alongside Óscar Husillos, Lucas Búa, and David García Zurita. He was selected for the 2023 European Athletics U23 Championships in Espoo, Finland to compete in the individual 400 metres, as well as the 4 x 400 metres relay.

In July 2024, he ran a new personal best time of 45.93 seconds in the heats, before running 46.16 seconds in the final to win the Spanish U23 Championships over 400 metres, in Burgos.

He was selected for the 2025 European Athletics Indoor Championships in Apeldoorn, Netherlands, but did not reach the semi-finals of the 400 metres. He did however, win a silver medal in the 4 x 400 metres relay on 9 March 2025 alongside his compatriots Manuel Guijarro, Óscar Husillos, and Bernat Erta, setting a new Spanish record time of 3:05.18. He was selected for the 2025 World Athletics Indoor Championships in Nanjing but had to withdraw at the last minute due to a medical issue and did not compete.

He competed at the 2025 World Athletics Relays in China in the Men's 4 × 400 metres relay in May 2025. He competed at the 2025 European Athletics U23 Championships in Bergen, Norway, placing sixth in the final of the 400 metres. Later in the championships, he ran as part of the gold medal winning Spanish 4 x 400 metres relay team. He was selected for the Spanish team for the 2025 World Athletics Championships in Tokyo, Japan.

Fernandez won the 400 metres at the 2026 Spanish Indoor Championships in Valencia, running 46.69 seconds in the final to win ahead of David Garcia. He reached the semi-finals of the 400 metres at the 2026 World Athletics Indoor Championships in Toruń, Poland. Also at the championships, he won a silver medal in the mixed 4 x 400 metres relay alongside Garcia, Blanca Hervás and Paula Sevilla.

On the opening day of the 2026 World Athletics Relays in Botswana he was part of the men's 4x400m relay team that 3:00.26, a new national record that surpassed the previous best achieved in Munich in 2022.

== Personal Bests ==
Outdoor
Event	Mark	Location	Date
200 metres	20.77 (+0.7)	Bilbao	29 June 2025
400 metres	45.47	Tarragona	2 August 2025
800 metres	1:53.01	Durango	22 May 2021

Indoor / Short Track
Event	Mark	Location	Date
200 metres	21.56	Valencia	14 February 2026
400 metres	45.95	Salamanca	7 February 2026
800 metres	1:55.73	San Sebastián	16 January 2021
