= Sabrina Dockery =

Jamaican sprinter (born 2006)

Personal information
- Nationality: Jamaican
- Born: 17 September 2006 (age 20)

Sport
- Sport: Athletics
- Event: Sprint
- Club: Pure Athletics
- Coached by: Lance Brauman

Achievements and titles
- Personal bests: 100m: 10.92 (2026); 200m: 23.10 (2024); 400m: 54.12 (2023)
Medal record
Women's athletics
Representing Jamaica
World U20 Championships
Gold medal – first place	2024 Lima	4×100 m relay
Pan American U20 Championships
Gold medal – first place	2025 Asunción	4×100 m relay
Bronze medal – third place	2023 Mayagüez	4x400 m mixed relay
CARIFTA Games (U20)
Gold medal – first place	2024 St George's	100 m
Gold medal – first place	2025 Port of Spain	4 × 100 m relay
Bronze medal – third place	2024 St George's	200 m
Bronze medal – third place	2025 Port of Spain	200 m

Sabrina Dockery (born 17 September 2006) is a Jamaican sprinter.

== Early life ==
Dockery was educated at Lacovia High School in St. Elizabeth, Jamaica.

== Career ==
She was a bronze medalist with the Jamaican team in the mixed 4 × 400 m relay at the 2023 Pan American U20 Athletics Championships in Mayagüez, Puerto Rico in August 2023.

Dockery won the U20 100 metres final at the 2024 CARIFTA Games in St. George's, Grenada, ahead of compatriot Theianna-Lee Terrelonge. She was a gold medalist with the Jamaican women's 4 x 100 metres team at the 2024 World Athletics U20 Championships in Lima, Peru.

== 2025 ==
In February 2025, Dockery won the 100 metres at the 2025 Jamaica Athletics Administrative Association (JAAA) Carifta Trials in 11.30 seconds, finishing ahead of Shanoya Douglas. She lowered her personal best for the 100 metres to 11.12 seconds and then 11.08 seconds at the 2025 Jamaica's Boys’ and Girls’ Championships. She also finished second to Jody-Ann Daley in the 200 metres at the championships. She was disqualified for a false start defending her the Under 20 girls 100m title at the 2025 CARIFTA Games in Port of Spain, Trinidad and Tobago. In August, she won a gold medal as part of the Jamaica women's 4 x 100 metres relay team at the 2025 Junior Pan American Games in Asunción, Paraguay, alongside Alana Reid, Serena Cole and Marissa Palmer, with the quartet running a championship record 43.52 seconds.

In October 2025, it was announced that she would be turning professional, signing a four-year contract with Adidas, and training with Lance Brauman at the Pure Athletics training group in Florida as part of a training group that includes compatriots Niesha Burgher and Brianna Lyston, as well as Noah Lyles.

== 2026 ==
On 6 June 2026, Dockery set a new personal best 10.92 seconds to win the 100 metres at the USATF Lone Star Grand Prix in College Station, Texas.

== Athletics achievements ==
Information from her World Athletics profile unless otherwise noted.

=== Personal bests ===
Type	Distance	Time (s)	Wind (m/s)	Venue	Date	Notes
Individual events
Outdoor	100 metres	10.92	+1.6	College Station, United States	6 June 2026	
Outdoor	200 metres	23.10	+0.9	St. George's, Grenada	31 March 2024	
Outdoor	400 metres	54.12	—N/a	Kingston, Jamaica	30 March 2023	
Team events
Outdoor	4 × 100 metres relay	42.42	—N/a	Gainesville, United States	18 April 2026	
Outdoor	4 × 400 metres relay	3:43.59	—N/a	Kingston, Jamaica	18 April 2022	
Outdoor	Mixed 4 × 400 metres relay	3:25.03	—N/a	Mayagüez, Puerto Rico	4 August 2023	

=== International competitions ===
Representing Jamaica
Year	Competition	Venue	Position	Event	Time	Notes
2022	CARIFTA Youth Games	Kingston, Jamaica	2nd	200 m	24.25	
2022	CARIFTA Youth Games	Kingston, Jamaica	1st	4 × 400 m relay	3:43.59	
2023	CARIFTA Youth Games	Nassau, Bahamas	—	200 m	DQ	TR16.8
2023	Pan American U20 Championships	Mayagüez, Puerto Rico	3rd	Mixed 4 × 400 m relay	3:25.03	
2024	CARIFTA Games	St. George's, Grenada	1st	100 m	11.26	
2024	CARIFTA Games	St. George's, Grenada	3rd	200 m	23.13	
2024	World U20 Championships	Lima, Peru	9th (sf)	200 m	23.75	
2025	CARIFTA Games	Port of Spain, Trinidad and Tobago	—	100 m	DQ	TR16.8
2025	CARIFTA Games	Port of Spain, Trinidad and Tobago	3rd	200 m	23.45	
2025	CARIFTA Games	Port of Spain, Trinidad and Tobago	1st	4 × 100 m relay	43.65	
2025	Pan American Junior Games	Asunción, Paraguay	1st	4 × 100 m relay	43.51	GR
