= 2026 World Athletics U20 Championships – Men's discus throw =

Men's discus throw at the 2026 World Athletics U20 Championships
- Venue: Hayward Field
- Dates: 8 August (Qualification); 9 August (Final)
- Competitors: 29 from 23 nations
- Winning distance: 66.39 m NU20R

Medalists
gold medal	Simon Rosselli	United States
silver medal	Sten-Erik Iir	Estonia
bronze medal	Joseph Salmon	Jamaica

The men's discus throw at the 2026 World Athletics U20 Championships was held at Hayward Field in Eugene, United States on 8 and 9 August 2026.

== Records ==
U20 standing records prior to the 2026 World Athletics U20 Championships were as follows:

Record	Athlete & Nationality	Mark	Location	Date
World U20 Record	Miká Sosna (GER)	71.37 m	Schönebeck, Germany	10 June 2022
Championship Record	Mykolas Alekna (LTU)	69.81 m	Nairobi, Kenya	22 August 2021
World U20 Leading	Joseph Salmon (JAM)	67.55 m	Kingston, Jamaica	26 March 2026

== Results ==
=== Qualification ===
Qualification took place in the morning session on 8 August 2026. Athletes attaining a mark of at least 60.50 metres (Q) or at least the 12 best performers (q) qualified for the final.

==== Group A ====
Place	Athlete	Nation	Round			Mark	Notes
Place	Athlete	Nation	#1	#2	#3	Mark	Notes
1	Stefan Gaisbauer	Austria	x	63.11		63.11 m	Q, PB
2	Francesco D'Angelo	Italy	62.63			62.63 m	Q, PB
3	Jakub Rodziak	Poland	59.06	61.58		61.58 m	Q
4	Yehia Sawaby	Egypt	61.29			61.29 m	Q
5	Sten-Erik Iir	Estonia	61.03			61.03 m	Q
6	Elijah Wilson	Australia	58.94	59.45	60.67	60.67 m	Q, SB
7	Kamari Kennedy	Jamaica	59.91	x	60.65	60.65 m	Q
8	Hamad Dhawi Al Sultan	Qatar	59.47	x	x	59.47 m	PB
9	Chris Marcell	United States	x	59.85	x	59.85 m	
10	Ludvig Ellgren	Sweden	59.25	x	x	59.25 m	SB
11	Danylo Batarchuk	Ukraine	55.87	x	x	55.87 m	
12	Louis-David Gagnon	Canada	x	52.19	55.43	55.43 m	
13	Emilios Alexandrou	Greece	52.71	x	x	52.71 m	
14	Denzel Phillips	Saint Lucia	x	50.44	x	50.44 m	

==== Group B ====
Place	Athlete	Nation	Round			Mark	Notes
Place	Athlete	Nation	#1	#2	#3	Mark	Notes
1	Joseph Salmon	Jamaica	x	x	62.10	62.10 m	Q
2	Yaroslav Lystopad	Ukraine	53.52	52.84	61.50	61.50 m	Q
3	Maxim Sazhnev	Kazakhstan	61.37			61.37 m	Q, NU20R
4	Joshua Gerber	South Africa	57.29	59.69	61.19	61.19 m	Q, PB
5	Simon Rosselli	United States	60.84			60.84 m	Q
6	Toms Samauskis	Latvia	x	60.61		60.61 m	Q, NU20R
7	Nishchay Phogat	India	59.19	59.46	x	59.46 m	Q
8	Szymon Zając	Poland	58.23	51.57	x	58.23 m	
9	Jacob McKinlay	Great Britain	x	55.86	57.17	57.17 m	
10	Brandon Ariel Delgado	Mexico	56.15	56.33	x	56.33 m	SB
11	Mattia Bartolini	Italy	54.96	x	55.30	55.30 m	
12	Eghosa Ehigiator	Canada	53.82	x	54.75	54.75 m	
13	Chang-hyun Son	South Korea	45.96	x	51.72	51.72 m	
—	Austin McDougall	New Zealand	x	x	x	NM	
—	Max Louis Emmrich	Germany	x	x	x	NM	

=== Final ===
The final took place in the afternoon session on 9 August 2026.

Place	Athlete	Nation	Round						Mark	Notes
Place	Athlete	Nation	#1	#2	#3	#4	#5	#6	Mark	Notes
1st place, gold medalist(s)	Simon Rosselli	United States	63.32	61.29	64.16	63.59	62.20	66.39	66.39 m	NU20R
2nd place, silver medalist(s)	Sten-Erik Iir	Estonia	62.94	x	63.32	64.57	65.42	x	65.42 m	PB
3rd place, bronze medalist(s)	Joseph Salmon	Jamaica	62.08	64.37	64.33	63.95	x	63.30	64.37 m	
4	Kamari Kennedy	Jamaica	49.82	61.58	64.18	62.61	x	x	64.18 m	PB
5	Yehia Sawaby	Egypt	x	62.49	x	63.99	x	x	63.99 m	PB
6	Yaroslav Lystopad	Ukraine	58.47	62.74	61.85	60.55	x	x	62.74 m	PB
7	Stefan Gaisbauer	Austria	56.69	62.19	59.88	51.96	x		62.19 m	
8	Jakub Rodziak	Poland	58.61	57.48	61.46	x	58.77		61.46 m	
9	Joshua Gerber	South Africa	58.46	61.43	x	x			61.43 m	PB
10	Francesco D'Angelo	Italy	42.54	55.23	60.49	x			60.49 m	
11	Maxim Sazhnev	Kazakhstan	59.85	x	x				59.85 m	
12	Toms Samauskis	Latvia	48.01	x	58.88				58.88 m	
13	Elijah Wilson	Australia	56.47	52.86	x				56.47 m	
