= Joseph Salmon (discus thrower) =

Jamaican athlete (born 2007)

Personal information
- Nationality: Jamaican
- Born: Joseph Richard Salmon; 22 September 2007 (age 18)

Sport
- Country: Jamaica
- Sport: Athletics
- Event: Discus throw
- College team: Nebraska Cornhuskers

Achievements and titles
- Personal bests: Discus 1.75kg 67.55m (AU20R); Shot Put 6kg 18.17m
Medal record
Men's athletics
Representing Jamaica
NACAC U23 Championships
Gold medal – first place	2026 Tlaxcala	Discus
World U20 Championships
Bronze medal – third place	2026 Eugene	Discus
CARIFTA Games Junior (U20)
Gold medal – first place	2026 St. George's	Discus throw
Gold medal – first place	2025 Port of Spain	Discus throw

Joseph Richard Salmon (born 22 September 2007) is a Jamaican discus thrower.

== Biography ==
He was educated at Clarendon College before transferring to Jamaica College in St. Andrew, Jamaica. Joseph is slated for the University of Nebraska this fall 2026.

== Career 2025 ==
Salmon won the 2025 high school "Champs" in the discus throw with throw of 62.14m. In April, he won the gold medal in the U20 discus throw at the 2025 CARIFTA Games in Port of Spain in Trinidad and Tobago, with a throw of 56.82 metres.

== 2026 ==
Salmon set a Jamaican national junior and "Champs" records of 67.55m to retain the boys Class 1 discus throw gold medal title at the ISSA/GraceKennedy Boys’ and Girls’ Athletics Championships in March 2026. He broke the previous Jamaican junior record and Champs Class 1 record of 66.88m, set in 2011 by Traves Smikle, and moved to eighth on the Jamaican all-time under-20 list.

The following month, he won the gold medal in the U20 discus throw at the 2026 CARIFTA Games in St. George's, Grenada ahead of compatriot Kamari Kennedy, with a throw of 65.38 metres. That year, he agreed to join the University of Nebraska in the United States.

In July 2026, he won the gold medal in the discus throw at the 2026 NACAC U23 Championships in Mexico. Having entered the championships as the world U20 leader, on 8 August, Salmon threw 62.10 m with his final attempt to automatically qualify for the final at the 2026 World Athletics U20 Championships in Eugene, USA.
