= Tiana Marshall =

Jamaican athlete (born 2007)

Personal information
- Nationality: Jamaican
- Born: 5 November 2007 (age 19)

Sport
- Country: Jamaica
- Sport: Athletics
- Event: Hurdling
- Coached by: Michael Carr

Achievements and titles
- Personal best: 100 mh: 12.97 (2026)
Medal record
Women's athletics
Representing Jamaica
World U20 Championships
Bronze medal – third place	2026 Eugene	100m hurdles
CARIFTA Games Junior (U20)
Gold medal – first place	2026 St. George's	100m hurdles
Gold medal – first place	2026 St George's	4x100 m relay
Gold medal – first place	2025 Port of Spain	100m hurdles

Tiana Marshall (born 5 November 2007) is a Jamaican sprint high hurdler.

== Biography ==
Marshall was educated at Wolmer's Girl School in Kingston, Jamaica.

== 2025 ==
At the Jamaican Carifta Trials in March 2025, she ran 13.18 seconds for the 100 metres to win ahead of Lyanna Davidson. Marshall subsequently won the U20 100 metres hurdles at the 2025 CARIFTA Games. Marshall won the Jamaican under-20 100 metres national title in June 2025, winning ahead of Briana Campbell, to remain unbeaten in the 2025 season.

== 2026 ==
Marshall won the Jamaican U20 Carifta Trials 100 metres hurdles race in March 2026 in a personal-best 12.97 seconds. Later that month, Marshall won the 100 metres hurdles at the 2026 ISSA/GraceKennedy Boys and Girls Athletics Championships running 13.33 seconds (-2.0 m/s) into a strong headwind in the final having the day earlier broken the meet record with a time of 12.98 seconds. She won the U20 100 m hurdles at the 2026 CARIFTA Games in St. George's, Grenada in 13.43 seconds. Alongside Renecia Edwards, Natrece East, and Shanoya Douglas, she also won the gold medal in the women's U20 4 x 100 metres in a time of 43.76 seconds. In June, she won the 100 metres hurdles title at the 2026 Jamaican Athletics U20 Championships. Represented Jamaica in the 100 metres hurdles she won the bronze medal at the 2026 World Athletics U20 Championships in Eugene, finishing behind Madeline Cooper of the United States and Tumi Ramokgopa of South Africa.
