= Uroy Ryan =

Long jumper (born 2004)

Personal information
- Born: 22 March 2004 (age 22)

Sport
- Sport: Athletics
- Event: Long jump

Achievements and titles
- Personal best: Long jump: 8.07 m (2026)
Medal record
Men's athletics
Representing Saint Vincent and the Grenadines
NACAC U23 Championships
Gold medal – first place	2026 Tlaxcala	Long jump
NACAC Championships (U18)
Gold medal – first place	2021 San José	Long jump

Uroy Ryan (born 22 March 2004) is a track and field athlete from Saint Vincent and the Grenadines. He is the indoor national record holder in the long jump.

== Biography ==
Ryan attended Petersville Primary School, the Emmanuel High School Mespo and the Thomas Secondary School before later studying at Jamaica College, and Kansas State University in the United States.

In March 2021, he broke the Saint Vincent and the Grenadines under-20 national record in the long jump, surpassing the previous best set by Dexter Browne in 1991, when he jumped 7.34 metres at the Jamaica Athletics Administration Association (JAAA) qualifiers at the Jamaica National Stadium in Kingston. Ryan subsequently won the gold medal in the long jump at the 2021 NACAC U18 Championships in San Jose, Costa Rica, finishing ahead of Jamaican Jaydon Hibbert.

The following year, Ryan placed fifth overall in the long jump at the 2022 World Athletics U20 Championships in Cali, Colombia, in August 2022. Competing at the 2023 NACAC U23 Championships, he placed fourth in the long jump competition. Ryan also won the Class One long jump title at the 2023 Boys and Girls Champs in Jamaica, that year extending his national under-20 record to 8.01m.

Ryan broke the St. Vincent and the Grenadines indoor national record in the long jump with 7.88 metres in 2025. He broke his own record with 7.90m on February 27, 2026, competing for Kansas State at the Big 12 Indoor Track and Field Championship, in Texas. In doing so, Ryan became the first athlete from Kansas State to win the Big 12 Indoor long jump title since 2016. Ryan jumped 8.04 metres to place fifth at the 2026 NCAA Division I Indoor Track and Field Championships in Fayetteville, Arkansas.

In June 2026, he placed third in the men's long jump at the 2026 NCAA Outdoor Championships in Eugene, Oregon. The following month, Ryan won the gold medal in the long jump at the 2026 NACAC U23 Championships in Tlaxcala, Mexico, where he made a new personal best jump of 8.07 metres. He represented Saint Vincent and the Grenadines in the long jump at the 2026 Commonwealth Games in Glasgow, Scotland, qualifying for the final and placing sixth overall.
