= Lavanya Williams =

Jamaican athlete (born 2005)

Personal information
- Nationality: Jamaican
- Born: 8 December 2005 (age 20)

Sport
- Sport: Athletics
- Event: Sprint
- Club: Dynamic Speed
- Coached by: Michael Frater

Achievements and titles
- Personal bests: 60m: 7.07 (Spanish Town, 2026); 100m: 10.90 (Santo Domingo, 2026); 200m: 22.44 (Kingston, 2026)
Medal record
Women's athletics
Representing Jamaica
Commonwealth Games
Gold medal – first place	2026 Glasgow	4×100m relay
World Relays
Gold medal – first place	2026 Gaborone	4×100 m relay
NACAC U23 Championships
Gold medal – first place	2026 Tlaxcala	100 m
Silver medal – second place	2026 Tlaxcala	200 m
Pan American U20 Championships
Silver medal – second place	2023 Mayagüez	4×100 m relay

Lavanya Williams (born 8 December 2005) is a Jamaican sprinter.

== Early life ==
Williams attended Rusea's High School in Hanover, Jamaica, and later attended William Knibb Memorial High School in Trelawny, Jamaica.

== Career ==
=== 2021 ===
In 2021, she won her age-group 100 metres and 200 metres at the 2021 (ISSA)/GraceKennedy Boys’ and Girls’ Athletics Championships, winning in 12.18 (-2.4 m/s) in the 100 metres and the 200 metres in 24.50 (-1.3 m/s). Later that season, she competed at the NACAC U18 Championships finishing 5th in 200 metres in 24.71s.

=== 2023 ===
She was runner-up to Sabrina Dockery over 100 metres at the Purewater/JC/R. Danny Williams Invitational Track and Field Development Meet in January 2023. Williams was a silver medalist in the women's 4 x 100 metres at the 2023 Pan American U20 Athletics Championships in Mayagüez, Puerto Rico. She was also a finalist over 200 metres at the Championships.

=== 2026 ===
Williams is a member of Dynamic Speed athletic club. In February 2026 Williams recorded a win in 7.17 seconds against Elaine Thompson-Herah over 60 metres at the Camperdown Classic, before placing second behind her the following week in 7.28 seconds at the SW Isaac Henry Invitational in Jamaica. Williams ran a personal best 7.13 seconds for the 60 metres (+1.0) at the 2026 Gibson McCook Relays in Kingston. On 7 March, she placed second behind Jonielle Smith in a wind-assisted 6.99 (+2.3) for the 60 metres at the 2026 Jamaican World Indoor Trials, having run a 7.07s (+0.3) personal best in the heats.

On 4 April 2026, Williams won the 100 metres at the Miramar Invitational in Florida, with a wind-assisted time of 10.99 seconds (+2.6 m/s). At Velocity Fest on 19 April, Williams lowered her personal best twice for the 100 m, running 11.04 in the semi-final and 10.96 in the final. She was named in the Jamaica squad for the 2026 World Athletics Relays in Gaborone, Botswana, and ran in the women's 4 x 100 metres relay as part of the Jamaican team which won their heat on the opening day of competition. The following day, she ran the third leg, passing the baton to Elaine Thompson-Herah, as Jamaica won the gold medal in 42.00 seconds. Later that month, she won the 200 m with a personal best 23.09 seconds at the Coqui International Cup in Puerto Rico. On 31 May, she set a new personal best 10.95 to place second in the 100 metres at the 2026 Diamond League in Rabat. On 21 June, Williams was runner-up to Alana Reid in the 200 metres final at the 2026 Jamaican Athletics Championships, in a personal best 22.44 seconds. She also placed sixth in the final of the 100 metres. In July 2026, she won the gold medal in the 100 m at the 2026 NACAC U23 Championships. Later at the championships she won the silver medal behind Reid in the 200 m final. She was a finalist in the 200 metres at the 2026 Commonwealth Games in Glasgow, Scotland, placing fifth overall. Later at the Games, she won a gold medal in the women's 4 × 100 m relay. In September, Williams was a finalist over 100 m at the inaugural World Ultimate Championship in Budapest, placing seventh overall.

== Athletics achievements ==
Information from her World Athletics profile unless otherwise noted.

=== Personal bests ===
Type	Distance	Time (s)	Wind (m/s)	Venue	Date	Notes
Individual events
Outdoor	60 metres	7.07	+0.3	Spanish Town, Jamaica	7 March 2026	
Outdoor	100 metres	10.90	+0.7	Santo Domingo, Dominican Republic	22 August 2026	
Outdoor	200 metres	22.44	+1.0	Kingston, Jamaica	21 June 2026	
Team events
Outdoor	4 × 100 metres relay	41.96	—N/a	Gaborone, Botswana	2 May 2026	
Outdoor	4 × 100 metres relay Mx	41.79	—N/a	Miramar, United States	4 April 2026	

=== International competitions ===
Representing Jamaica
Year	Competition	Venue	Position	Event	Time	Notes
2021	NACAC U18 Championships	San José, Costa Rica	5th	200 m	24.71	
2023	Pan American U20 Championships	Mayagüez, Puerto Rico	7th	200 m	24.74	
2023	Pan American U20 Championships	Mayagüez, Puerto Rico	2nd	4 × 100 m relay	45.23	
2026	World Relays	Gaborone, Botswana	1st	4 × 100 m relay	42.00	
2026	NACAC U23 Championships	Apizaco, Mexico	1st	100 m	10.91	
2026	NACAC U23 Championships	Apizaco, Mexico	2nd	200 m	22.40	
2026	Commonwealth Games	Glasgow, United Kingdom	5th	200 m	22.62	
2026	Commonwealth Games	Glasgow, United Kingdom	1st	4 × 100 m relay	42.65	
2026	World Ultimate Championship	Budapest, Hungary	7th	100 m	11.07	
