= Shanoya Douglas =

Jamaican athlete

Personal information
- Nationality: Jamaican
- Born: Shanoya Mikalia Douglas; 11 September 2007 (age 19) Westmoreland, Jamaica

Sport
- Sport: Athletics
- Event: Sprint
- Coached by: Garth Smythe

Achievements and titles
- Personal bests: 100 m: 10.98 (2026); 200 m: 22.11 (2026) NU20R CGR; 400 m: 52.60 (2026)
Medal record
Women's athletics
Representing Jamaica
World U20 Championships
Gold medal – first place	2024 Lima	4×100 m relay
Gold medal – first place	2026 Eugene	4×100 m relay
Silver medal – second place	2024 Lima	200 m
Silver medal – second place	2026 Eugene	100m
Silver medal – second place	2026 Eugene	200m
Pan American U20 Championships
Silver medal – second place	2023 Mayagüez	4×400 m relay
CARIFTA Games (U20)
Gold medal – first place	2026 St George's	100 m
Gold medal – first place	2026 St George's	200 m
Gold medal – first place	2026 St George's	4×100 m relay
Gold medal – first place	2025 Port of Spain	100 m
Gold medal – first place	2025 Port of Spain	200 m
Gold medal – first place	2025 Port of Spain	4×100 m relay
Gold medal – first place	2025 Port of Spain	4×400 m relay
Gold medal – first place	2024 St George's	200 m
Gold medal – first place	2024 St George's	4×100 m relay
Gold medal – first place	2024 St George's	4×400 m relay

Shanoya Mikalia Douglas (born 11 September 2007) is a Jamaican sprinter. She was a double medalist at the 2024 U20 World Championships and in 2026 set a new Jamaican under-20 record for the 200 metres.

== Early life ==
She attended Muschett High School in Jamaica, for whom she competed at the Penn Relays in Philadelphia, Pennsylvania, United States in 2024. The following year, she transferred to Holland High School under the tutelage of the same coach.

== Career ==
=== 2024 ===
She won gold in the 200 metres and the 4 × 100 m relay and 4 × 400 m relay at the 2024 CARIFTA Games, with a 200 metres personal best of 23.16 seconds. She was the winner of the 200 metres and 400 metres at the ISSA/GraceKennedy Boys' and Girls' Athletics Championships in 2024, with a 52.96 personal best in the 400m.

Douglas was third across the line over 200 metres at the 2024 World Athletics U20 Championships in Lima, Peru as a 16-year-old, running 23.10 seconds in the final, and was later promoted to the silver medal behind Torrie Lewis after the race winner was disqualified for a doping offence. She had raced her semi final in 23.34 seconds. She also won gold in the 4 × 100 m relay at the Championships.

=== 2025 ===
Douglas completed a victorious sprint double in the 100m and the 200m in 23.30 in her age category at the 2025 Jamaica's Boys’ and Girls’ Championships in March 2025. In April 2025, Douglas both ran a personal best time of 11.26 (0.3 m/s) to win the U20 girls 100m title at the 2025 CARIFTA Games in Port of Spain, Trinidad and Tobago. She then also won the 200m at the championships in 23.02 seconds. She finished in sixth place over 200 metres at the 2025 senior Jamaican Athletics Championships in Kingston.

=== 2026 ===
In January 2026, Douglas broke the Jamaican national junior indoor record for the 300m at the Puma New York International Showcase, running 36.98 seconds. She set a personal best of 52.60 seconds for the 400 metres at the Camperdown Classic the following month, also winning the 100 metres in 11.45 seconds on the same day. Douglas won the Jamaican U20 Carifta Trials 100 metres race in March 2026 with a personal best time of 11.06 (+1.5 m/s). Douglas also won the U20 girls 200 metres in 22.58 seconds for a sprint double at the trials. She was initially selected to represent Jamaica at the 2026 World Athletics Indoor Championships in Toruń, Poland, but later withdrew. That month, she won the 100 m title at the ISSA/GraceKennedy Boys and Girls’ Athletics Championships in a personal best 10.98 seconds (+0.7) to move to fourth on the Jamaicans junior all-time list with a year of eligibility remaining, behind only Tina Clayton, Alana Reid and Briana Williams. Also at the championships, she set a new Jamaican under-20 record in winning the 200 metres in 22.36 seconds, despite a strong headwind (-1.6 m/s), breaking the national record of Briana Williams from 2018 and the Champs record of Brianna Lyston from 2022. On 6 April, Douglas ran 200 m in 22.11 seconds (1.9 m/s) to break her own national junior record in winning the gold medal at the 2026 CARIFTA Games in St George's, Grenada. The time also broke the Carifta record of 22.77 seconds set in 2013 by Shaunae Miller and moved her to tied third with Allyson Felix on the world under-20 all-time list behind Christine Mboma and JaMeesia Ford. She achieved the sprint double after stumbling out the blocks to retain her 100 m title in 11.13s (-0.8 m/s) at the Games. Alongside Renecia Edwards, Tiana Marshall, and Natrece East, Douglas also won the gold medal in the women's U20 4 x 100 metres in 43.76 seconds. Douglas was the winner of the Austin Sealy award for the most outstanding athlete at the Games.

In June 2026, Douglas won a sprint double at the Jamaican U20 Championships winning both the 100m and the 200m in Kingston, winning the 100 m in 11.08 seconds ahead of Theianna-Lee Terrelonge, and running 22.56 seconds to win the 200 metres. In August, she won silver medals in both the 100 metres and 200 metres at the 2026 World Athletics U20 Championships in Eugene, Oregon, finishing behind Mia Maxwell of the United States in both finals. Later at the championships, she anchored the Jamaican women's 4 × 100 m relay team to the gold medal.

== Personal life ==
Shanoya was born in Grange Hill, Westmoreland, but lives with her aunt and attends school in Falmouth, Trelawny.
