= Athletics at the 2026 Summer Youth Olympics – Men's discus throw =

Athletics event at the 2026 Summer Youth Olympics

Men's discus throw at the IV Summer Youth Olympic Games
- Venue: Complexe Iba Mar Diop
- Date: 9 November 2026
- Competitors: 9 from 9 nations
- Winning time: 68.23 m

Medalists
1st place, gold medalist(s)		Yahya Sawaby	Egypt
2nd place, silver medalist(s)		Kamari Kennedy	Jamaica
3rd place, bronze medalist(s)		Vittorio Gorziglia	Chile

The men's discus throw event at the 2026 Summer Youth Olympics was held on 9 November 2026 at the Complexe Iba Mar Diop in Dakar, Senegal.

The event was contested as a single final, with Egypt's Yahya Sawaby winning the gold medal with a best throw of 68.23 metres.

== Schedule ==
The competition was scheduled for 9 November 2026 at 14:00 local time (UTC), at the Complexe Iba Mar Diop.

Date	Time	Round
9 November 2026	14:00	Final

== Results ==
The discus throw competition consisted of a single final, in accordance with the official competition format for field events.

=== Final ===
The final was held on 9 November 2026. The competition began at 13:59 and concluded at 15:10.

Rank	Bib	Athlete	Nation	1	2	3	4	5	6	Result	Remark
1st place, gold medalist(s)	353	Yahya Sawaby	Egypt	67.10	x	68.23	64.52	x	x	68.23	PB
2nd place, silver medalist(s)	392	Kamari Kennedy	Jamaica	61.82	63.30	x	x	65.07	66.31	66.31	PB
3rd place, bronze medalist(s)	327	Vittorio Gorziglia	Chile	54.56	x	x	49.61	56.00	x	56.00	
4	358	Cristóbal Díaz	Spain	52.92	52.56	55.09	x	54.71	53.43	55.09	
5	397	Maxim Sazhnev	Kazakhstan	52.15	47.15	53.74	x	52.69	55.05	55.05	
6	404	Mohammed Alsubaei	Saudi Arabia	x	x	45.74	x	x	53.85	53.85	
7	456	Makisig Laban	Samoa	34.57	x	x	x	34.54	35.73	35.73	PB
8	433	Shahzain Safdar	Pakistan	34.20	35.56	34.97	x	34.44	x	35.56	PB
—	406	Yahya Abdullah	Libya	x	x	x	—	—	—	NM	
