= 2026 CARIFTA Games =

XLXIII CARIFTA Games
- Dates: 4–6 April
- Host city: St. George's, Grenada
- Venue: Kirani James Athletic Stadium
- Level: U20 and U17
- Events: U20: 37 (incl. 5 open), U17: 32

The 2026 CARIFTA Games took place between 4 and 6 April 2026 at the Kirani James Athletic Stadium in St. George's, Grenada.The CARIFTA Swimming Championships were held in Martinique at the Lamentin Sporting Center.

== Medal summary ==
=== Boys U-20 ===
Event	Gold		Silver		Bronze	
100 metres (+0.9 m/s)	Miles Outerbridge; Bermuda	10.21	Nyrone Wade; Jamaica	10.27	Trevaughn Stewart; Trinidad and Tobago	10.31
200 metres (+1.8 m/s)	Sanjay Seymore; Jamaica	20.63	Miles Outerbridge; Bermuda	20.67	Eagan Neely; Bahamas	20.73
400 metres	Malachi Austin; Guyana	46.01	Zion Davis; Bahamas	46.18	Jabari Matheson; Jamaica	46.37
800 metres	Kiile Alexander; Trinidad and Tobago	1:50.38	Nicholas Frederick; Grenada	1:51.22	Joel Morgan; Jamaica	1:51.72
1500 metres	Joel Morgan; Jamaica	4:00.96	Darius Harding; Trinidad and Tobago	4:00.99	Javon Roberts; Guyana	4:01.42
5000 metres ^{†}	Luke McIntyre; Barbados	15:42.51	Ayden Cintron; U.S. Virgin Islands	16:03.61	Jeremy Samaroo; Trinidad and Tobago	16:07.34
110 metres hurdles (99.1 cm) (-2.5 m/s)	Robert Miller; Jamaica	13.43	Jahcario Wilson; Bahamas	13.53	Romario Jibbison; Jamaica	13.73
400 metres hurdles	Jahvanie Tyrell; Jamaica	50.35	Omari Brown; Trinidad and Tobago	50.91	Robert Miller; Jamaica	50.97
4 × 100 metres relay	Trinidad and Tobago; Zaccheus Charles; Trevaughn Stewart; Makaelan Woods; Kaeden Herbert	39.64	Jamaica; Khamari Gordon; Nyrone Wade; Elijah Smeikle; Sanjay Seymore	39.85	Grenada; Ian George; Daniel Darell; Ethan Sam; Kneon Mark-Stanislaus	40.18
4 × 400 metres relay	Barbados; Nadal Seale; Aidan Moore; Jahkye Brewster; Shamari Greenige-Lewis	3:05.49 CR	Jamaica; Jabulani McLeod; Jabari Matheson; Paul Henry; Jahvanie Tyrell	3:06.79	Trinidad and Tobago; Omari Brown; Makaelan Woods; Brion Scott; Kiile Alexander	3:10.64
High jump	David Hall; Jamaica	2.00 m	Joshua Williams; Bahamas	2.00 m	Michael Neil; Jamaica	2.00 m
Pole vault ^{†}	Solal Thiery; Martinique	4.15 m	Noah Mars; Guadeloupe	3.50 m	Wilfrid Boistol; Martinique	3.30 m
Long jump	Carlin Archer; Bahamas	7.68 m	Michael-Andre Edwards; Jamaica	7.47 m	Joshua Williams; Bahamas	7.16 m
Triple jump	Michael-Andre Edwards; Jamaica	15.84 m	Rekelme Hunter; Jamaica	15.28 m	Aaron Massiah; Barbados	15.26 m
Shot put (6.0 kg)	Jayden Walcott; Barbados	18.41 m	Joseph Salmon; Jamaica	18.17 m	Jelany Chinyelu; Trinidad and Tobago	16.62 m
Discus throw (1.75 kg)	Joseph Salmon; Jamaica	65.38 m	Kamari Kennedy; Jamaica	55.39 m	Denzel Phillips; Saint Lucia	53.24 m
Javelin throw	Addison James; Dominica	63.73 m	Ethan North; Bahamas	62.80 m	Maliek Francis; Antigua and Barbuda	60.14 m
Decathlon	Tyrique Vincent; Trinidad and Tobago	6824 pts w	Jaquan Souden; Jamaica	6760 pts	Kaleb Campbell; Trinidad and Tobago	6598 pts

^{†}: Open event for both U20 and U17 athletes.

=== Girls U-20 ===
Event	Gold		Silver		Bronze	
100 metres (-0.8 m/s)	Shanoya Douglas; Jamaica	11.13	Alexxe Henry; Trinidad and Tobago	11.39	Natrece East; Jamaica	11.41
200 metres (+1.9 m/s)	Shanoya Douglas; Jamaica	22.11 CR	Natrece East; Jamaica	23.39	Breanne Barnett; Haiti	23.49
400 metres	Tianna Springer; Guyana	52.47	Kadia Rock; Barbados	53.21	Davine Dickenson; Jamaica	54.12
800 metres	Ashlyn Simmons; Barbados	2:09.07	Danya Skeete; Barbados	2:10.50	Dallia Fairweather; Jamaica	2:11.15
1500 metres	Ashlyn Simmons; Barbados	4:36.94	Kevongaye Fowler; Jamaica	4:37.39	Dallia Fairweather; Jamaica	4:44.16
3000 metres ^{†}	Aniqah Bailey; Trinidad and Tobago	10:14.10	Laila McIntyre; Barbados	10:15.61	Sushana Johnson; Jamaica	10:26.90
100 metres hurdles (-3.2 m/s)	Tiana Marshall; Jamaica	13.43	Jenna-Marie Thomas; Trinidad and Tobago	13.93	Sofia Swindell; U.S. Virgin Islands	13.94
400 metres hurdles	Nastassia Fletcher; Jamaica	58.05	Marria Crossfield; Jamaica	58.74	Jenna-Marie Thomas; Trinidad and Tobago	59.20
4 × 100 metres relay	Jamaica; Renecia Edwards; Tiana Marshall; Natrece East; Shanoya Douglas	43.76	Trinidad and Tobago; Imani Mills; Noemi Theodore; Zada Charles; Alexxe Henry	44.17	Barbados; Semara Olton; Kadia Rock; Afia Greenidge; Alika Harewood	45.40
4 × 400 metres relay	Jamaica; Davine Dickenson; Breana Brown; Shanika Lindsey; Nastassia Fletcher	3:34.03	Bahamas; Syrmiah Crawley; Kei-Mahri Hanna; Saige Demeritte; Alexis Roberts	3:37.92	Barbados; Kanedra Morgan; Ashlyn Simmons; Danya Skeete; Kadia Rock	3:40.68
High jump	Zavien Bernard; Jamaica	1.78 m	Jah'Kyla Morton; British Virgin Islands	1.76 m	Alexandria Komolafe; Bahamas	1.70 m
Pole vault ^{†}	Naima Caprice; Martinique	3.20 m CR	Naya Jules; Saint Lucia	2.95 m	Tessica Laurence; Trinidad and Tobago	2.30 m
Long jump	Brooklyn Lyttle; Belize	6.16 m w	Rivka Goede; Curaçao	5.80 m	Seannah Parsons; Trinidad and Tobago	5.76 m
Triple jump	Seannah Parsons; Trinidad and Tobago	13.12 m	Léane Alfred; French Guiana	12.91 m	Melodie Peux; Martinique	12.57 m
Shot put	Able Mills; Jamaica	15.27 m	Peyton Winter; Trinidad and Tobago	14.14 m	Marla-Kay Lampart; Jamaica	13.81 m
Discus throw	Able Mills; Jamaica	53.85 m	Marla-Kay Lampart; Jamaica	48.96 m	Tejha Thompson; Bahamas	38.92 m
Javelin throw	Taysha Stubbs; Bahamas	48.84 m	Zoelle Jamel; Jamaica	47.19 m	Kamera Strachan; Bahamas	44.88 m
Heptathlon ^{†}	Tenique Vincent; Trinidad and Tobago	5028 pts	Kaori Robley; Trinidad and Tobago	4358 pts	Zsa-Zsa Frans; Curaçao	4191 pts

^{†}: Open event for both U20 and U17 athletes.

=== Mixed Open ===
Event	Gold		Silver		Bronze	
4 × 400 metres relay	Guyana; Tishawn Easton; Akeela Dover; Malachi Austin; Tianna Springer	3:20.79 CR	Jamaica; Jabulani McLeod; Kaysian Sewell; Paul Henry; Shanika Lindsey	3:22.27	Barbados; Nadal Seale; Kanedra Morgan; Zachary Wall. T'nia Lashley	3:24.36

=== Boys U-17 ===
Event	Gold		Silver		Bronze	
100 metres (+0.8 m/s)	Kai Kelly; Jamaica	10.37	Jayden Goodridge; Trinidad and Tobago	10.48	Jaquan Douglas; Trinidad and Tobago	10.67
200 metres (+0.9 m/s)	Emmile Higgins; Bahamas	20.94	Mario Ross; Jamaica	21.00	Zion Bradford; Bahamas	21.54
400 metres	Jason Pitter; Jamaica	47.47	Diwayne Sharpe; Jamaica	47.89	Zion Bradford; Bahamas	48.43
800 metres	Nahjah Wyatte; Sint Maarten	1:53.26	Markland Williams; Jamaica	1:53.60	Kymarni Newton; Saint Kitts and Nevis	1:55.34
1500 metres	Jevaughn Tomlin; Jamaica	4:10.92	Jermaine Shepherd; Guyana	4:11.12	Luke Plummer; Jamaica	4:12.19
3000 metres	Jevaughn Tomlin; Jamaica	9:12.49	Sanchez Smith; Bermuda	9:22.24	Zindzele Renwick-Williams; Barbados	9:26.95
110 metres hurdles (91.4 cm) (+1.6 m/s)	Mark-Daniel Allen; Jamaica	13.25	Brandon Bennett; Jamaica	13.47	Shawne Ferguson III; Bahamas	14.30
400 metres hurdles (84 cm)	ONeil Lawrence; Jamaica	53.06	Kavian Minnott; Jamaica	53.36	Tevaughn Hall; Bahamas	53.45
4 × 100 metres relay	Bahamas; Ky'len Johnson; Avonte Lotmore; Lavario Ferguson; Emmile Higgins	41.36	Trinidad and Tobago; Christian Parks; Jaquan Douglas; Dario Tavernier; Isaiah Teesdale	41.56	Barbados; Tyrell Clarke; Josiah Gill; Asher Brandford; Jalino Hamlett	42.25
4 × 400 metres relay	Jamaica; Kavian Minnott; Diwayne Sharpe; Markland Williams; Jason Pitter	3:13.07	Bahamas; Va'ron Pinder; Aiden Musgrove; Avonte Lotmore; Zion Bradford	3:13.81	Barbados; Khalil Bryan; Taje Coward; Jakio Devonish; Jalino Hamlett	3:19.90
High jump	Quenten Kopra; Curaçao	1.90 m	Herwens Guerrier; Turks and Caicos Islands	1.90 m	Emron Anthony; Grenada	1.90 m
Long jump	Michal Paul; Trinidad and Tobago	6.93 m	Talshawn Edwards; Jamaica	6.71 m	Randall Monroe; Saint Lucia	6.60 m
Triple jump	Joshua Patrick; Jamaica	14.59 m	Talshawn Edwards; Jamaica	14.35 m	Zayne Martin; Trinidad and Tobago	14.33 m
Shot put (5.0 kg)	Kamaal Armstrong; Barbados	15.96 m	Kazim Telesford; Grenada	15.67 m	Jaafari Shaw; Trinidad and Tobago	15.19 m
Discus throw (1.50 kg)	Jaafari Shaw; Trinidad and Tobago	56.30 m	Kazim Telesford; Grenada	53.04 m	Xavier Tracey; Jamaica	51.30 m
Javelin throw (700 gr)	Deshawn Smart; Grenada	65.09 m	Ahkeel Williams; Bahamas	58.23 m	Tannon Niemeyer; Trinidad and Tobago	57.90 m
Octathlon	Justin Shepherd; Bahamas	5387 pts	Ashley Demeritte; Bahamas	4897 pts	Javid Noel; Grenada	4808 pts

=== Girls U-17 ===
Event	Gold		Silver		Bronze	
100 metres (-0.5 m/s)	Tyra Fenton; Antigua and Barbuda	11.30	Jazae Johnson; Bahamas	11.30	Brion Ward; Bahamas	11.63
200 metres (-2.5 m/s)	Tyra Fenton; Antigua and Barbuda	23.39	Jael Peters; Trinidad and Tobago	23.95	Keyezra Thomas; Bahamas	24.03
400 metres	Shameika McLean; Jamaica	52.47 CR	Keyezra Thomas; Bahamas	52.58	Tyra Fenton; Antigua and Barbuda	52.62
800 metres	Olivia Solomon; Guyana	2:10.76	Annalisa Brown; Grenada	2:14.40	Aisha Wajid; Haiti	2:14.96
1500 metres	Nyla Kerr; Trinidad and Tobago	4:43.61	Osheá Cummings; Trinidad and Tobago	4:44.24	Annalisa Brown; Grenada	4:46.00
100 metres hurdles (76 cm) (-0.4 m/s)	Tashana Godfrey; Jamaica	13.27	Macaela Gordon; Jamaica	13.39	Chelcia Joseph; Trinidad and Tobago	13.96
400 metres hurdles	Alyssa Carty; Jamaica	61.84	Hope Edwards; Haiti	62.48	Imani Lowe; Jamaica	63.69
4 × 100 metres relay	Bahamas; Keyezra Thomas; Taree Forbes; Jazae Johnson; Brion Ward	44.21 CR	Jamaica; Shayon Smith; Azaria Harris; Danelia Clarke; Rihanna Scott	45.02	Trinidad and Tobago; Daija Reid; Jael Peters; Eden Chee-Wah; Xiah Tobias	46.10
4 × 400 metres relay	Jamaica; Imani Lowe; Alyssa Carty; Daniellia Dixon; Shameika McLean	3:40.11	Bahamas; Zara Fraser; Brianna Bootle; Nevaeh Mackey; Keyezra Thomas	3:44.39	Trinidad and Tobago; Eden Chee-Wah; Oshea Cummings; Soleil Caruth; Nyla Kerr	3:45.64
High jump	Destinee Cenac; Saint Lucia	1.72 m	Stefvanco Henry; Jamaica	1.69 m	Shania Mottley; Barbados	1.69 m
Long jump	Jazae Johnson; Bahamas	6.02 m	Stefvanco Henry; Jamaica	5.70 m	Dashanelle Clarke; Jamaica	5.54 m
Triple jump	Jazae Johnson; Bahamas	12.35 m	Stefvanco Henry; Jamaica	11.51 m	Kaelynna Modeste; Grenada	11.32 m
Shot put (3.0 kg)	Gabriella Linton; Cayman Islands	14.19 m	Shamanda Wilmot; Jamaica	13.99 m	Kaliah Haye; Cayman Islands	13.97 m
Discus throw	Kaliah Haye; Cayman Islands	47.06 m	Dajounae Rudolph; Jamaica	45.13 m	Zoeyann Plummer; Jamaica	43.83 m
Javelin throw (500 gr)	Shamanda Wilmot; Jamaica	46.39 m	Zonique Charles; Antigua and Barbuda	46.27 m	Niaviv Matrona; Curaçao	41.52 m

== Medal table ==
* Host nation (Grenada)

Rank	Nation	Gold	Silver	Bronze	Total
1	Jamaica (JAM)	28	27	16	71
2	Trinidad and Tobago (TTO)	9	11	15	35
3	Bahamas (BAH)	8	12	10	30
4	Barbados (BAR)	6	3	8	17
5	Guyana (GUY)	4	1	1	6
6	Antigua and Barbuda (ATG)	2	1	2	5
7	Martinique (MTQ)	2	0	2	4
8	Cayman Islands (CAY)	2	0	1	3
9	Grenada (GRN)*	1	4	6	11
10	Bermuda (BER)	1	2	0	3
11	Curaçao (CUW)	1	1	2	4
11	Saint Lucia (LCA)	1	1	2	4
13	Turks and Caicos Islands (TCA)	1	1	0	2
14	Belize (BIZ)	1	0	0	1
14	Dominica (DMA)	1	0	0	1
14	Sint Maarten (SXM)	1	0	0	1
17	Haiti (HAI)	0	1	2	3
18	U.S. Virgin Islands (ISV)	0	1	1	2
19	British Virgin Islands (IVB)	0	1	0	1
19	French Guiana (GUF)	0	1	0	1
19	Guadeloupe (GLP)	0	1	0	1
22	Saint Kitts and Nevis (SKN)	0	0	1	1
Totals (22 entries)		69	69	69	207
