= Simon Rosselli =

American track and field athlete (born 2007)

Personal information
- Born: 4 June 2007 (age 19)
- Height: 6 ft 5 in (196 cm)
- Weight: 230 lb (104 kg)

Sport
- Country: United States
- Sport: Athletics
- Events: Discus throw; Shot put
- College team: Oregon Ducks
- Club: Nike Elite
- Coached by: TJ Crater

Achievements and titles
- Personal bests: Discus throw: 66.39 m (217 ft 9 3/4 in) NU20R; Shot put: 19.39 m (63 ft 7 1/4 in)
Medal record
Men's athletics
Representing United States
World U20 Championships
Gold medal – first place	2026 Eugene	Discus

Simon Rosselli (born 4 June 2007) is an American track and field athlete who competes in the discus throw and shot put. He is the world under-20 champion and the national under-20 record holder in the discus throw.

== Early life ==
Rosselli was born on June 4, 2007 in Spokane, Washington. He comes from a family who were involved in sports, as his parents played basketball and volleyball at the University of Memphis.

== Competition ==
=== 2023-present: High school competition and World U20 Champion ===
Rosselli attended Mead High School in Spokane. He begun participating in track and field in his freshman year. During his sophomore year of high school, he won the WIAA State Championship Meet in the discus throw in 2024. This result led him to signing with the Nike Elite program. He became a three-time state champion in the discus throw, also winning in 2025 and 2026, as well as placing second and first in the shot put in 2025 and 2026 respectively. He won the discus throw at the 2026 Nike Outdoor Nationals, setting a new Washington state high school record with a throw of 68.78 metres, using the 1.6kg disc, and was named the 2026 Gatorade Player of the Year for Track and Field in Washington.

Rosselli won the USATF U20 Championship title in June 2026 with a then personal best discus throw of 62.67 metres. He also placed fifth in the shot put, with a throw of 19.39 meters, also setting a personal best. His result in the discus throw allowed him to represent the United States at the World Athletics U20 Championships. In August, he set an American national under-20 record throw to win the 2026 World Athletics U20 Championships title in Eugene, with a throw of 66.39 metres.

== Personal life ==
Rosselli has four half siblings. He likes to fish.

== Achievements ==
All statistics from athlete's profile on World Athletics, unless otherwise noted.

=== International championships ===
Achievements at international championships
Year	Competition	Event	Distance	Position
2026	World Athletics U20 Championships	Discus throw	66.39 m (217 ft 9 3/4 in)	1st place, gold medalist(s)
