= Robert Miller (hurdler) =

Jamaican hurdler

Personal information
- Born: 10 June 2008 (age 18)

Sport
- Sport: Athletics
- Event: Hurdles
Medal record
Men's athletics
Representing Jamaica
CARIFTA Games (U20)
Gold medal – first place	2026 St George's	110 m hurdles
Gold medal – first place	2025 Port of Spain	400 m hurdles
Bronze medal – third place	2026 St George's	400 m hurdles
CARIFTA Games (U17)
Gold medal – first place	2024 St George's	400 m hurdles

Robert Miller (born 10 June 2008) is a Jamaican hurdler who competes in both the 110 metres hurdles and the 400 metres hurdles.

== Biography ==
Miller was educated at Calabar High School and Hydel High School. He set a championship record to win the U17 400 metres hurdles at the 2024 CARIFTA Games in Grenada, running a time of 52.19 seconds to surpass the previous record held by Stephen Newbold of the Bahamas.

Miller had a fall in the final of the Class One 400 metres hurdles at the 2025 ISSA/GraceKennedy Boys and Girls' Athletics Championships (Champs), before later winning the gold medal in 50.42 seconds in the Under-20 event at the 2025 CARIFTA Games in Trinidad and Tobago.

Miller won the Class 1 Boys' 110 metres hurdles final at the ISSA/GraceKennedy Athletics Championships at the National Stadium on 28 March 2026, in a time of 13.41 seconds. In April, he won the gold medal in the 110 metres hurdles and the bronze medal in the 400 metres hurdles at the 2026 CARIFTA Games in Grenada. In June 2026, he moved to ninth on the Jamaican all-time U20 list with a win in the 400 metres hurdles at the Jamaican U20 Championships winning in 49.96 seconds in Kingston.
