= 2023 Pan American U20 Athletics Championships =

XXI Pan American U20 Athletics Championships
- Dates: August 4–6
- Host city: Mayagüez, Puerto Rico
- Venue: Mayagüez Athletics Stadium
- Level: U20
- Events: 45

The 2023 Pan American U20 Athletics Championships was the 21st edition of the biennial track and field competition for under-20 athletes from the Americas, organized by the Association of Panamerican Athletics. The competition was held at the Mayagüez Athletics Stadium in Mayagüez, Puerto Rico, from 4 to 6 August 2023.

== Medal summary ==
=== Medal table ===
* Host nation (Puerto Rico)

Rank	Nation	Gold	Silver	Bronze	Total
1	United States	28	17	13	58
2	Canada	6	4	6	16
3	Jamaica	1	6	4	11
4	Brazil	1	4	4	9
5	Peru	1	2	1	4
6	Bahamas	1	1	1	3
7	Chile	1	1	0	2
7	Costa Rica	1	1	0	2
7	Uruguay	1	1	0	2
10	Nicaragua	1	0	0	1
11	Puerto Rico*	0	2	4	6
12	Argentina	0	1	2	3
13	Colombia	0	1	0	1
13	U.S. Virgin Islands	0	1	0	1
15	Mexico	0	0	4	4
16	Guatemala	0	0	1	1
Totals (16 entries)		42	42	40	124

=== Men ===
Event	Gold		Silver		Bronze	
100 metres	Tyler Azcano; United States	10.26	Bouwahjgie Nkrumie; Jamaica	10.31	Adrian Canales; Puerto Rico	10.35
200 metres	Renan Gallina; Brazil	20.44	Garrett Kaalund; United States	20.57	José Figueroa; Puerto Rico	20.63
400 metres	Will Floyd; Canada	45.62	Christopher Morales Williams; Canada	46.34	Grant Buckmiller; United States	46.58
800 metres	Daniel Watcke; United States	1:48.86	Simeon Birnbaum; United States	1:49.31	Marco Gonçalves; Brazil	1:49.46
1500 metres	Riley Flemington; Canada	3:50.70	Gonzalo Gervasini; Uruguay	3:51.79	Uriel Muñoz; Argentina	3:51.91
5000 metres	Ethan Coleman; United States	14:44.58	Elvis Companocca; Peru	14:45.85	William Ryan; United States	14:52.06
110 metres hurdles	Blaise Atkinson; United States	13.46	Daniel Beckford; Jamaica	13.52	José da Silva; Brazil	13.55
400 metres hurdles	Bryce Tucker; United States	51.36	Yan Vázquez; Puerto Rico	51.57	Damon Frabotta; United States	52.19
3000 m steeplechase	Caleb Jarema; United States	9:05.92	Paulo Gómez; Costa Rica	9:07.20	Mark López; Mexico	9:16.26
4 × 100 m relay	Bahamas; Zion Campbell; Carlos Brown; Jeremiah Adderley; Adam Musgrove	39.75	Puerto Rico; Diego Álvarez; Adrian Canales; José Figueroa; Esteban Torres	40.15	Argentina; Matías Castro; Lucas Villegas; Tomas Villegas; Tomas Mondino	40.26
4 × 400 m relay	United States; George Garcia; Jacob Andrews; Jace McGavock; Grant Buckmiller	3:05.98	Jamaica; Erique Webster; Delano Kennedy; Tariq Dacres; Jaheene Belle	3:09.17	Brazil; Gabriel Durans; Carlos Lara; Vinicius Galeno; Elias Oliveira	3:09.57
10,000 m walk	Gabriel Alvarado; Nicaragua	43:04.46	Jesús Ramírez; Colombia	43:18.31	Hugo Reyes; Mexico	43:43.15
High jump	Grant Campbell; United States	2.19 m	Brion Stephens; United States	2.17 m	Brandon Pottinger; Jamaica	2.11 m
Pole vault	Jack Mann; United States	5.00 m	Aurélio de Souza; Brazil	4.90 m	Brenden Vanderpool; Bahamas	4.75 m
Long jump	Juriad Hughes; United States	7.61 m	Royan Walters; Jamaica	7.48 m	Ashton Torns; United States	7.39 m
Triple jump	Sterling Scott; United States	15.67 m	Diego Bustamante; Chile	15.28 m	Divine Aniamaka; Canada	15.25 m
Shot put	Gary Moore; United States	19.60 m	Michael Pinckney; United States	17.39 m	Alan Cabanellas; Puerto Rico	16.53 m
Discus throw	Seth Allen; United States	60.58 m	Brendon See; United States	58.32 m	Shaiquan Dunn; Jamaica	58.17 m
Hammer throw	Miguel Castro Vasquez; Chile	72.47 m	Tomás Olivera; Argentina	71.16 m	José Chávez; Mexico	70.23 m
Javelin throw	Mike Stein; United States	71.38 m	Kaden Cartwright; Bahamas	65.43 m	Blake Orr; United States	65.12 m
Decathlon (junior)	Aiden Carter; United States	6808 pts	Koby Kessler; United States	6748 pts	Nate Paris; Canada	5954 pts
WR world record | AR area record | CR championship record | GR games record | NR national record | OR Olympic record | PB personal best | SB season best | WL world leading (in a given season)

=== Women ===
Event	Gold		Silver		Bronze	
100 metres	Alana Reid; Jamaica	11.33	Kaila Jackson; United States	11.41	Camryn Dickson; United States	11.48
200 metres	Shawnti Jackson; United States	22.35 CR	Elise Cooper; United States	22.80	Emily Martin; Canada	23.75
400 metres	Christine Mallard; United States	51.88	Lauren Lewis; United States	52.06	Dejanea Oakley; Jamaica	52.50
800 metres	Sophia Gorriarian; United States	2:04.68	Sorcha Shiu; Canada	2:06.42	Kyla Martin; Canada	2:06.51
1500 metres	Ellie Shea; United States	4:16.61	Anita Poma Mendoza; Peru	4:18.28	Kyla Martin; Canada	4:25.95
3000 metres	Ellie Shea; United States	9:05.78 CR	Charlotte Sinke; Canada	9:50.93	Zariel Macchia; United States	9:52.40
5000 metres	Chloe Turner; Canada	17:09.71	Nimrit Ahuja; United States	17:19.65	Veronica Huacasi; Peru	17:20.74
100 metres hurdles	Myla Greene; United States	13.70	Asharria Ulett; Jamaica	13.76	Lays Rodrigues Silva; Brazil	13.94
400 metres hurdles	Sanaa Hebron; United States	56.90	Michelle Smith; U.S. Virgin Islands	57.99	Allyria McBride; United States	58.32
3000 m steeplechase	Veronica Huacasi; Peru	10:23.60	Catherine Garrison; United States	10:28.34	Sydney Collier; United States	11:25.04
4 × 100 m relay	United States; Kaila Jackson; Camryn Dickson; Avery Lewis; Shawnti Jackson	42.88 CR	Jamaica; Asharria Ulett; Alana Reid; Lavanya Williams; Tonie-Ann Forbes	45.23	Canada; Maria Ulysse; Robyn Larkan; Daniella Oyenuga; Asia Philips	46.15
4 × 400 m relay	United States; Lauren Lewis; Madison Whyte; Sydney Segalla; Christine Mallard	3:30.25	Jamaica; Shanque Williams; Shanoya Douglas; Tonyan Beckford; Dejanea Oakley	3:38.56	Brazil; Amanda Miranda; Grazielly Kamilly Vanderlei; Camille de Oliveira; Júlia Rocha	3:38.87
10,000 m walk	Sharon Herrera Soto; Costa Rica	49:53.76	Heather Durrant; United States	50:02.61	Renata Cortes Romero; Mexico	52:07.23
High jump	Jennessa Wolfe; Canada	1.71 m	Kya Crooke; United States	1.68 m	Lauren Barnes; United States	1.65 m
Pole vault	Kenna Stimmel; United States	4.30 m	Ella McRitchie; United States	4.25 m	Alyssa Quinones Mixon; Puerto Rico	4.10 m
Long jump	Avery Lewis; United States	6.22 m	Vanessa Sena; Brazil	6.17 m	Morgan Davis; United States	5.99 m
Triple jump	Asia Philips; Canada	13.12 m	Tolu Akinduro; Canada	13.03 m	Agur Dwol; United States	12.75 m
Shot put	Mensi Stiff; United States	16.70 m	Wisdom Williams; United States	15.14 m	Taniele de Jesus; Brazil	14.16 m
Discus throw	Julia Tunks; Canada	56.98 m	Abigail Martin; Jamaica	55.47 m	Maddie Fey; United States	52.70 m
Hammer throw	Giovanna Meeks; United States	59.17 m	Skylar Soli; United States	59.13 m	Sophie Pérez; Guatemala	57.93 m
Javelin throw	Manuela Rotundo; Uruguay	55.49 m	Evelyn Bliss; United States	52.73 m	Shea Greene; United States	45.33 m
Heptathlon	Jaicieonna Gero-Holt; United States	5463 pts	Abby Elmore; United States	5186 pts	Júlia Leite; Brazil	5067 pts
WR world record | AR area record | CR championship record | GR games record | NR national record | OR Olympic record | PB personal best | SB season best | WL world leading (in a given season)

=== Mixed ===
Event	Gold		Silver		Bronze	
4 × 400 m relay	United States; George Garcia; Madison Whyte; Max De Angelo; JaMeesia Ford	3:18.07 CR	Brazil; Vinicius Galeno; Camille de Oliveira; Elias Oliveira; Júlia Rocha	3:24.23	Jamaica; Erique Webster; Sabrina Dockery; Tariq Dacres; Oneika Brissett	3:25.03
WR world record | AR area record | CR championship record | GR games record | NR national record | OR Olympic record | PB personal best | SB season best | WL world leading (in a given season)

== Participating countries ==
- Argentina
- Bahamas
- Brazil
- Canada (30)
- Chile
- Costa Rica
- Guatemala
- Haiti
- Jamaica
- Mexico
- Peru
- Puerto Rico
- United States
- United States Virgin Islands
- Uruguay
