= 2025 CARIFTA Games =

XLXII CARIFTA Games
- Dates: 19–21 April
- Host city: Port of Spain, Trinidad and Tobago
- Venue: Hasely Crawford Stadium
- Level: U20 and U17
- Events: U20: 37 (incl. 5 open), U17: 32

The 2025 CARIFTA Games took place between 19 and 21 April 2025 at the Hasely Crawford Stadium in Port of Spain, Trinidad and Tobago.

== Medal summary ==
=== Boys U-20 ===
Event	Gold		Silver		Bronze	
100 metres (-1.4 m/s)	Jamal Stephenson; Jamaica	10.24	Dylan Woodruffe; Trinidad and Tobago	10.30	Ethan Sam; Grenada	10.41
200 metres (+0.6 m/s)	Jayden Green; Barbados	20.93	Tyreece Foreman; Jamaica	20.95	Junior Gallimore; Jamaica	21.01
400 metres	Zion Miller; Bahamas	46.51	Malachi Austin; Guyana	46.54	Da Shaun Lezama; Trinidad and Tobago	47.43
800 metres	Shavan Jarrett; Jamaica	1:51.19	Deangelo Brown; Grenada	1:51.21	Aaron Morris; Barbados	1:51.90
1500 metres	Deangelo Brown; Grenada	3:58.96	Asher Patel; Aruba	3:59.61	Joel Morgan; Jamaica	4:01.43
5000 metres ^{†}	Wyndel Jerome Beyde; Aruba	15:58.94	Christiaan Jansen; Aruba	15:59.99	Luke McIntyre; Barbados	16:06.00
110 metres hurdles (99.1 cm) (-1.4 m/s)	Shaquane Gordon; Jamaica	13.19 CR	Daniel Clarke; Jamaica	13.21	Tahj Brown; Bahamas	13.82
400 metres hurdles	Robert Miller; Jamaica	50.42	Princewell Martin; Jamaica	51.41	Akanye Francis; Saint Kitts and Nevis	51.56
4 × 100 metres relay	Jamaica; Jamal Stephenson; Shaquane Gordon; Antonio Powell; Tyreece Foreman	39.56	Trinidad and Tobago; Trevaughn Stewart; Kadeem Chinapoo; Hakeem Chinapoo; Dylan Woodruffe	39.75	Barbados; Makai King; Jayden Green; Kevion Newton; Teon Haynes	40.43
4 × 400 metres relay	Bahamas; Zion Davis; Aiden Kelly; Emmanual Adams; Zion Miller	3:06.18	Jamaica; Daneil Wright; Paul Henry; Shavan Jarrett; Tajh-Marques White	3:07.44	Trinidad and Tobago; Makaelan Woods; Daeshaun Cole; Ben-Israel Bannister; Da Shaun Lezama	3:08.11
High jump	Chavez Penn; Jamaica	2.14 m	Joshua Williams; Bahamas	2.00 m	Aaron McKenzie; Jamaica	1.95 m
Pole vault ^{†}	Kenny Moxey Jr. Bahamas	4.30 m	Lucas Ledoux; Martinique	4.10 m	Tristan Carias; Guadeloupe	4.00 m
Long jump	Michael-Andre Edwards; Jamaica	7.41 m	William McKinney; Bahamas	7.36 m	Teon Haynes; Barbados	7.35 m
Triple jump	Chavez Penn; Jamaica	16.14 m	Michael-Andre Edwards; Jamaica	15.66 m	Rodel Avant Greene; Guyana	15.50 m
Shot put (6.0 kg)	Despiro Wray; Jamaica	19.66 m	Devonte Edwards; Jamaica	18.73 m	Dylan Logan; Grenada	15.80 m
Discus throw (1.75 kg)	Joseph Salmon; Jamaica	56.82 m	Dylan Logan; Grenada	52.57 m	Devonte Edwards; Jamaica	50.97 m
Javelin throw	Addison Alickson James; Dominica	67.48 m	Tarique Daley; Jamaica	61.55 m	Rayvohn Telesford; Grenada	61.41 m
Decathlon	Tyrique Vincent; Trinidad and Tobago	6522 pts CR	Jurel Clement; Grenada	6510 pts	Mattias Serin; Guadeloupe	6249 pts

^{†}: Open event for both U20 and U17 athletes.

=== Girls U-20 ===
Event	Gold		Silver		Bronze	
100 metres (+0.3 m/s)	Shanoya Douglas; Jamaica	11.26	Geolyna Dowdye; Antigua and Barbuda	11.43	Shatalya Dorsett; Bahamas	11.45
200 metres (-0.3 m/s)	Shanoya Douglas; Jamaica	23.02	Sole Frederick; Trinidad and Tobago	23.43	Sabrina Dockery; Jamaica	23.45
400 metres	Tianna Springer; Guyana	53.07	Kadia Rock; Barbados	53.52	Abriana Wright; Jamaica	53.78
800 metres	Michelle Smith; U.S. Virgin Islands	2:07.23	Cindy Rose; Jamaica	2:08.49	Jovi Rose; Jamaica	2:10.97
1500 metres	Cindy Rose; Jamaica	4:37.95	Sushana Johnson; Jamaica	4:40.83	Attoya Harvey; Guyana	4:41.61
3000 metres ^{†}	Ashara Frater; Jamaica	10:27.29	Sushana Johnson; Jamaica	10:28.01	Oshea Cummings; Trinidad and Tobago	10:28.92
100 metres hurdles (-0.8 m/s)	Tiana Marshall; Jamaica	13.50	Maya Rollins; Barbados	13.80	Bryana Davidson; Jamaica	13.82
400 metres hurdles	Michelle Smith; U.S. Virgin Islands	56.60	Shevaughn Thomas; Jamaica	58.60	Jenna-Marie Thomas; Trinidad and Tobago	59.60
4 × 100 metres relay	Jamaica; Sabrina Dockery; Tiana Marshall; Abigail Wolfe; Shanoya Douglas	43.65	Bahamas; Khylee Wallace; Shatalya Dorsett; K'Leigh Davis; Jamiah Nabbie	44.65	Trinidad and Tobago; Sierra Joseph; Sole Frederick; Noemi Theodore; Sanaa Frederick	44.76
4 × 400 metres relay	Jamaica; Abrina Wright; Annastacia Hall; Jovi Rose; Shanoya Douglas	3:37.75	Barbados; Ashlyn Simmons; Kadia Rock; Aniya Nurse; Ariel Archer	3:39.36	Bahamas; Kei-Mahri Hanna; Makaiah Hitchman; A'Karee Roberts; Darvinique Dean	3:41.36
High jump	Daneille Noble; Jamaica	1.80 m	Shanniqua Williams; Jamaica	1.80 m	Jah'Kyla Morton; British Virgin Islands	1.70 m
Pole vault ^{†}	Jade Ferguson; Bahamas	3.10 m CR	Naya Jules; Saint Lucia	3.00 m NR	Clémentine Carias; Guadeloupe	2.90 m
Long jump	Gianna Paul; Trinidad and Tobago	6.48 m	Janae De Gannes; Trinidad and Tobago	6.36 m	Rohanna Sudlow; Jamaica	6.15 m
Triple jump	Keneisha Shelbourne; Trinidad and Tobago	12.98 m	Sabrina Atkinson; Jamaica	12.83 m	Léane Alfred; French Guiana	12.82 m
Shot put	Marla-Kay Lampart; Jamaica	17.44 m CR	Annae Mackey; Bahamas	17.14 m	Kimeka Smith; Jamaica	14.95 m
Discus throw	Annae Mackey; Bahamas	53.87 m	Shamoyea Morris; Jamaica	50.60 m	Marla-Kay Lampart; Jamaica	50.35 m
Javelin throw	Taysha Stubbs; Bahamas	50.03 m	Dior-Rae Scott; Bahamas	45.61 m	Angely Curiel; Curaçao	40.08 m
Heptathlon ^{†}	Tenique Vincent; Trinidad and Tobago	5053 pts	Clémentine Carias; Guadeloupe	4701 pts	Aaliyah Evans; Bahamas	4625 pts

^{†}: Open event for both U20 and U17 athletes.

=== Mixed Open ===
Event	Gold		Silver		Bronze	
4 × 400 metres relay	Bahamas; Emmanual Adams; Makaiah Hitchman; Zion Miller; Jamiah Nabbie	3:23.97	Jamaica; Daneil Wright; Annastacia Hall; Paul Henry; Jovi Rose	3:25.29	Grenada; Keelorn Moses; Cheffonia Houston; Kyle Nedd; Ameiah Samuel	3:27.46

=== Boys U-17 ===
Event	Gold		Silver		Bronze	
100 metres (0.0 m/s)	Michael Graham; Jamaica	10.53	Tiondre Frett; British Virgin Islands	10.58	Jaydon Collins; Jamaica	10.68
200 metres (+0.9 m/s)	Eagan Neely; Bahamas	21.22	Tiondre Frett; British Virgin Islands	21.52	Dahrion Belgrave; Barbados	21.68
400 metres	Eagan Neely; Bahamas	47.80	Diwayne Sharpe; Jamaica	48.27	Zachary Wall; Barbados	48.63
800 metres	Brion Scott; Trinidad and Tobago	1:56.48	Luke Plummer; Jamaica	1:58.13	Yohance Carty; Jamaica	1:58.16
1500 metres	Christopher Sammy; Trinidad and Tobago	4:09.65	Cameron Adkins; Bermuda	4:12.86	Luke Plummer; Jamaica	4:13.54
3000 metres	Christopher Sammy; Trinidad and Tobago	9:11.51	Armani Dillon; Trinidad and Tobago	9:12.22	Ebo Shafir McNeil; Guyana	9:22.61
110 metres hurdles (91.4 cm) (-0.7 m/s)	Jahcario Wilson; Bahamas	13.70	Brandon Bennett; Jamaica	14.08	Mark-Daniel Allen; Jamaica	14.30
400 metres hurdles (84 cm)	Jahcario Wilson; Bahamas	52.44	Jaeden Campbell; Jamaica	53.61	Eshanee Porter; Jamaica	54.26
4 × 100 metres relay	Bahamas; Jamaal Deloach Jr. Jahcario Wilson; J'Mari Moss; Eagan Neely	41.11	Grenada; Nathanael Douglas; Delron John; Crystophe Calliste; Karmal Joseph	41.40	Trinidad and Tobago; Khordel Lewis; Jquan Douglas; Jayden Goodridge; Alex Seepersad	41.61
4 × 400 metres relay	Bahamas; Jonathan Higgs; Jahcario Wilson; Jireh Woodside; Eagan Neely	3:12.72 CR	Jamaica; Jaeden Campbell; Rushaine Richards; Eshanee Porter; Diwayne Sharpe	3:13.28	Barbados; Zachary Wall; Aidan Moore; Jakobi Browne-Smith; Jahkye Brewster	3:15.95
High jump	Selethel Johnson; Jamaica	2.03 m	Obadiah Cherizar; Bahamas	1.95 m	Joshua Telesford; Grenada	1.95 m
Long jump	Amani Phillips; Jamaica	7.49 m	Michael Graham; Jamaica	7.33 m	Michal Paul; Trinidad and Tobago	7.03 m
Triple jump	Amani Phillips; Jamaica	15.58 m (w) (15.26 m CR)	Crystophe Calliste; Grenada	15.25 m (w)	Khi-Anthony Hall; Jamaica	14.21 m (w)
Shot put (5.0 kg)	Kamari Kennedy; Jamaica	18.90 m CR	Jayden Walcott; Barbados	17.42 m	Brandon Lawrence; Jamaica	16.82 m
Discus throw (1.50 kg)	Kamari Kennedy; Jamaica	60.87 m CR	Brandon Lawrence; Jamaica	49.00 m	Kaiden Kemp; Bahamas	47.71 m
Javelin throw (700 gr)	Ahkeel Williams; Bahamas	57.51 m	Jaheem Clarke; Bahamas	55.74 m	Delron John; Saint Kitts and Nevis	54.36 m
Octathlon	Omari Brown; Trinidad and Tobago	5158 pts CR	Shyiem Phillip; Grenada	4766 pts	Kamron Henfield; Bahamas	4572 pts

=== Girls U-17 ===
Event	Gold		Silver		Bronze	
100 metres (+0.2 m/s)	Jady Emmanuel; Saint Lucia	11.50	Adora Campbell; Jamaica	11.67	Brion Ward; Bahamas	11.78
200 metres (-0.4 m/s)	Jady Emmanuel; Saint Lucia	23.47	Keyezra Thomas; Bahamas	23.67	Tyra Fenton; Antigua and Barbuda	23.68
400 metres	Tyra Fenton; Antigua and Barbuda	53.93	Keyezra Thomas; Bahamas	54.34	De'Cheynelle Thomas; Saint Kitts and Nevis	55.71
800 metres	Alikay Reynolds; Jamaica	2:12.57	Kevongaye Fowler; Jamaica	2:14.01	Shian Lewis; Trinidad and Tobago	2:15.03
1500 metres	Osheá Cummings; Trinidad and Tobago	4:44.62	Aisha Wajid; Haiti	4:45.20	Denique Palmer; Jamaica	4:47.50
100 metres hurdles (76 cm) (-0.8 m/s)	Malayia Duncan; Jamaica	13.34	Nickayla Russell; Jamaica	13.71	Jasmine Thompson; Bahamas	14.33
400 metres hurdles	Syrmiah Crawley; Bahamas	62.85	Durlaina Rouse; Trinidad and Tobago	63.48	Alyssa Carty; Jamaica	63.62
4 × 100 metres relay	Jamaica; Shayon Smith; Adora Campbell; Malayia Duncan; Rihanna Scott	44.86 CR	Bahamas; Jazae Johnson; Brion Ward; Taree Forbes; Keyezra Thomas	45.30	Trinidad and Tobago; Zada Charles; Xiah Tobias; Eden Chee-Wah; Mikayla Granderson	45.96
4 × 400 metres relay	Jamaica; Shameika McLean; Kevongaye Fowler; Alikay Reynolds; Tracey-Ann Evans	3:39.39	Bahamas; Syrmiah Crawley; Keyezra Thomas; Brion Ward; Denika Gittens	3:45.27	Trinidad and Tobago; Kyah Hyson; Eden Chee-Wah; Durlaina Rouse; Shian Lewis	3:47.25
High jump	Sackoya Palmer; Jamaica	1.71 m	Shania Mottley; Barbados	1.71 m	Destinee Cenac; Saint Lucia	1.68 m
Long jump	Jazae Johnson; Bahamas	6.07 m	Taree Forbes; Bahamas	5.85 m (w)	Delora Johnson; Cayman Islands	5.40 m
Triple jump	Christina Charles; Grenada	12.05 m	Jazae Johnson; Bahamas	11.99 m	Mélodie Tsahia Peux; Martinique	11.81 m
Shot put (3.0 kg)	Gabriella Linton; Cayman Islands	14.07 m	Jamie-Lee Tulloch; Jamaica	13.02 m	Ranique Richards; Jamaica	12.57 m
Discus throw	Kaliah Haye; Cayman Islands	44.91 m	Davieka Lewis; Jamaica	40.81 m	Jamie-Lee Tulloch; Jamaica	37.65 m
Javelin throw (500 gr)	Zonique Charles; Antigua and Barbuda	46.29 m	Tatiana Sousa; Bermuda	42.24 m	Eboni Brathwaite; Barbados	39.16 m

== Medal table ==
* Host nation (Trinidad and Tobago)

Rank	Nation	Gold	Silver	Bronze	Total
1	Jamaica (JAM)	30	27	21	78
2	Bahamas (BAH)	16	13	8	37
3	Trinidad and Tobago (TTO)*	9	6	10	25
4	Grenada (GRN)	2	6	5	13
5	Antigua and Barbuda (ATG)	2	1	2	5
6	Saint Lucia (LCA)	2	1	1	4
7	Cayman Islands (CAY)	2	0	1	3
8	U.S. Virgin Islands (ISV)	2	0	0	2
9	Barbados (BAR)	1	5	8	14
10	Aruba (ARU)	1	2	0	3
11	Guyana (GUY)	1	1	3	5
12	Dominica (DMA)	1	0	0	1
13	British Virgin Islands (IVB)	0	2	1	3
14	Bermuda (BER)	0	2	0	2
15	Guadeloupe (GLP)	0	1	3	4
16	Martinique (MTQ)	0	1	1	2
17	Haiti (HAI)	0	1	0	1
18	Saint Kitts and Nevis (SKN)	0	0	3	3
19	Curaçao (CUW)	0	0	1	1
19	French Guiana (GUF)	0	0	1	1
Totals (20 entries)		69	69	69	207
