= Kamari Kennedy =

Jamaican athlete (born 2009)

Personal information
- Nationality: Jamaican
- Born: 5 February 2009 (age 17)

Sport
- Country: Jamaica
- Sport: Athletics
- Events: Discus throw, Shot put
Medal record
Men's athletics
Representing Jamaica
Youth Olympic Games
Silver medal – second place	2026 Dakar	Discus throw
CARIFTA Games Junior (U20)
Silver medal – second place	2026 St. George's	Discus throw
NACAC U18 Championships
Gold medal – first place	2026 Tlaxcala	Discus throw
CARIFTA Games Junior (U17)
Gold medal – first place	2025 Port of Spain	Discus throw
Gold medal – first place	2025 Port of Spain	Shot put

Kamari Kennedy (born 5 February 2009) is a Jamaican track and field athlete who competes in the discus throw and shot put.

== Biography ==
Kennedy was the winner of the Austin Sealy award for the most outstanding athlete at the 2025 CARIFTA Games. His performances at the Games included the breaking two U17 championship records. First winning the shot put with 18.90 metres, 10 cm more than the previous best mark. He later returned to win the U17 discus throw with 60.87m, breaking the previous record by more than seven metres.

Competing for Calabar High School, Kennedy threw a personal best of 60.84m to take the silver medal at the 2026 Champs U20 discus throw event behind Joseph Richard Salmon of Jamaica College. The following month, he won the silver medal in the U20 discus throw at the 2026 CARIFTA Games in St. George's, Grenada behind Salmon with a throw of 55.39 metres. In July 2026, he won the gold medal in the discus throw at the 2026 NACAC U18 Championships. On 8 August, Kennedy threw an automatic qualifying mark of 60.65 m to reach the final at the 2026 World Athletics U20 Championships in Eugene, USA.
