= Malachi Austin =

Guyanese athlete (born 2007)

Personal information
- Nationality: Guyanese
- Born: 21 February 2007 (age 19)

Sport
- Sport: Athletics
- Event: Sprinter

Achievements and titles
- Personal best: 400m 44.87 (2026) NU20R AU20R NR
Medal record
Men's athletics
Representing Guyana
Commonwealth Youth Games
Gold medal – first place	2023 Trinbago	4x400 m mixed relay
Silver medal – second place	2023 Trinbago	400 m
Junior Pan American Games
Bronze medal – third place	2025 Asunción	Mixed relay
South American U20 Championships
Gold medal – first place	2024 Lima	400 m
CARIFTA Games (U20)
Gold medal – first place	2026 St George's	400 m
Gold medal – first place	2024 St George's	Mixed relay
Gold medal – first place	2024 St George's	400 m
Gold medal – first place	2024 St George's	Mixed relay
Silver medal – second place	2025 Port of Spain	400 m
Bronze medal – third place	2024 St George's	4×400 m relay

Malachi Austin (born 17 February 2007) is a Guyanese sprinter. In 2024, he became national champion over 400 metres.

== Early life ==
He attended Tutorial High School in Georgetown, Guyana and is a member of the Running Brave Athletic Club. He committed to Louisiana State University in January 2025.

== Career ==
He won silver in the 400 metres at the 2023 Commonwealth Youth Games in Trinidad and Tobago in August 2023.

He won gold over 400 metres at the 2024 CARIFTA Games, where he also won bronze in the 4 × 400 m relay, and gold in the mixed 4 × 400 m relay as part of a team that set a new Guyanese national record time. He competed for Guyana at the 2024 World Athletics Relays in the Men's 4 × 400 metres relay. He became Guyana Senior National champion over 400 metres in June 2024, running 47.70 seconds. He won gold in the 400 metres at the 2024 South American U20 Championships in Athletics in July 2024. In August 2024, he reached the semi-finals of the World U20 Championships in Lima, Peru. However, was unable to complete the semi-final race due to an injury.

In April 2025, he won the silver medal in the U20 boys' 400 metres final at the 2025 CARIFTA Games in Port of Spain, Trinidad and Tobago. Later that year, he was a finalist oner 400 metres at the 2025 Junior Pan American Games in Asunción, Paraguay.

In April 2026, Austin claimed the 400 m title at the 2026 CARIFTA Games, winning in a time of 46.01 seconds. Later at the championships, he was part of the Guyana mixed 4x400m relay which set a new Games record of 3:20.79. That summer, he qualified over 400 metres for the 2026 NCAA Outdoor Championships having ran a South American U20 record of 44.87 seconds in May.
