= Garfield Reid =

Jamaican footballer (born 1981)

Personal information
- Date of birth: 14 January 1981 (age 45)
- Place of birth: Jamaica
- Height: 1.90 m (6 ft 3 in)
- Position: Defender

Team information
- Current team: Benfica F.C.

Senior career*
Years	Team	Apps	(Gls)
2003–2006	Rivoli United F.C.		
2004	→ HamKam (loan)	0	(0)
2006–2009	Waterhouse F.C.		
2009–2010	Rivoli United F.C.		
2010–	Benfica F.C.		

International career^{‡}
2004–	Jamaica	26	(0)
- * Club domestic league appearances and goals as of 14 January 2007 ‡ National team caps and goals as of 31 August 2007

Garfield Reid (born 14 January 1981) is a Jamaican football defender.

== Youth/high school career ==
Reid played the DaCosta Cup competition for Charlemont High School in Jamaica and also played youth football for Rivoli United F.C.

== Career ==
The wingback currently plays for the top-flight Jamaica National Premier League side Benfica F.C. but has also played for Waterhouse F.C. and Rivoli United F.C. He was the inaugural Jamaican in the Norwegian league when he signed on loan for Hamarkameratene in July 2004.

== International ==
He made his debut for the Reggae Boyz in 2004 against Uruguay and, up to November 2006, earned a total of 26 caps, scoring no goals.

Garfield Reid is a wing-back/midfielder who got his first call-up to the Jamaica national team under technical director Carl Brown, where he made his debut in an international friendly between Jamaica and Uruguay on Wednesday, 18 February 2004. Reid's call came after playing for the national U-23 team in Olympic Qualifying.

== Personal life ==
His daughter Alana Reid competes in track and field and became Jamaican 100m junior national record holder in March 2023.
