= 2026 NACAC U18 and U23 Championships in Athletics =

Sports competition in North America

NACAC U23 & U18 Championships
- Organisers: North American, Central American and Caribbean Athletic Association
- Edition: 13th
- Dates: 9–12 July
- Host city: Apizaco, Tlaxcala, Mexico
- Venue: Estadio Una Nueva Historia
- Level: Under 23; Under 18
- Type: Outdoor
- Events: 88
- Participation: 26 nations

The 2026 NACAC U23 & U18 Championships was the biennial athletics competition between North American, Central American and Caribbean Athletic Association nations: the 13th edition of NACAC U23 Championships in Athletics for athletes under the age of twenty-three and fourth edition of NACAC U18 Championships in Athletics for athletes under the age of eighteen.

The 2023 NACAC U23 & U18 Championships were organized by North America, Central America and Caribbean Athletic Association and were held 21–23 July 2026 in Apizaco, Tlaxcala, Mexico. As the host city was located 2380 metres above sea level, the results are considered to be set at altitude.

== Results ==
=== U23 Men ===
Event	Gold		Silver		Bronze	
100 metres (wind: +2.7 m/s)	Bouwahjgie Nkrumie; Jamaica	9.92	Damor Miller; Jamaica	10.03	Adrián Canales; Puerto Rico	10.08
200 metres (wind: +3.5 m/s)	Jayden Green; Barbados	20.17	Aaron Charles; Trinidad and Tobago	20.19	Adrián Canales; Puerto Rico	20.39
400 metres	Jasauna Dennis; Jamaica	45.33	Jarell Cruz; Puerto Rico	45.76	Alejandro Rosado; Puerto Rico	45.77
800 metres	Amado Amador; Mexico	1:48.99	Deangelo Brown; Grenada	1:50.49	Karol Picaso; Mexico	1:51.04
1500 metres	Miguel Santini; Puerto Rico	4:06.90	Esteban Oses; Costa Rica	4:07.26	Víctor Pérez; Mexico	4:07.56
5000 metres	Aldair Rosales; Mexico	14:46.59	Roberto Castro; Mexico	14:48.48	Esteban Oses; Costa Rica	15:38.68
10,000 metres†	Eduardo Pichardo; Mexico	31:32.46	Víctor Ramírez; Mexico	31:56.57	Emmanuel de León; Guatemala	33:57.04
110 metres hurdles (wind: +0.5 m/s)	Shaquane Gordon; Jamaica	13.54	Andre Harris; Jamaica	13.73	Tejaun Webbe; Saint Kitts and Nevis	14.26
400 metres hurdles	Romario Stewart; Jamaica	50.21	Yan Vázquez; Puerto Rico	50.24	Antonio Forbes; Jamaica	50.43
3000 metres steeplechase†	Alejandro Hernández; Mexico	9:45.15	Paulo Gómez; Costa Rica	10:00.48	Only 2 competitors	
4 × 100 metres relay	Jamaica; Bouwahjgie Nkrumie; Damor Miller; Odane Crooks; Andre Harris	39.30	Bahamas; Samalie Farrington; Zion Campbell; Tahj Brown; Adam Musgrove	39.47	Barbados; Teon Haynes; Jayden Green; Amari Knight; Aragorn Straker	39.59
4 × 400 metres relay	Puerto Rico; Yariel Pérez; Alejandro Rosado; LeBron Bessick; Jarell Cruz	3:05.08	Bahamas; Zion Shepherd; Javano Bridgewater; Sonycko Ilet; Andrew Styles	3:05.16	Barbados; Shamari Greenidge-Lewis; Aaron Morris; Brandon Hinds; Rashad Gibson	3:06.73
5000 metres walk	Denis Estrada; Guatemala	21:30.85	Lorenzo Dávila; Mexico	21:51.68	Lucien Beardsley; United States	22:44.67
High jump	Jesús Vázquez; Mexico	2.14 m	J'Quan Samuels; Anguilla	2.08 m	Denceel Álvarez; Guatemala	2.05 m
Pole vault	Brenden Vanderpool; Bahamas	4.80 m	Tyler Cash; Bahamas	4.80 m	Ángel Hernández; Mexico	4.80 m
Long jump	Uroy Ryan; Saint Vincent and the Grenadines	8.07 m	Teon Haynes; Barbados	7.50 m	Zach Washington; Puerto Rico	7.33 m
Triple jump	Antone Smith; Bahamas	16.06 m	Fernando Reyes; El Salvador	15.38 m	Gael Chávez; Mexico	15.33 m
Shot put	Jesús Guzmán; Mexico	18.02 m	Despiro Wray; Jamaica	17.33 m	Alan Cabanellas; Puerto Rico	16.93 m
Discus throw	Joseph Salmon; Jamaica	57.19 m	Nathan Villegas; Puerto Rico	54.79 m	Antonio Díaz; Mexico	49.83 m
Hammer throw†	Emilian Novelo; Mexico	52.90 m	Andre Smikle; British Virgin Islands	47.80 m	José Eduardo Chávez; Mexico	29.40 m
Javelin throw†	Addison James; Dominica	72.02 m	LeBron James; Trinidad and Tobago	69.24 m	Dorian Charles; Trinidad and Tobago	62.70 m
Decathlon†	Abimelec Zamorano; Mexico	6882 pts	Osman Sanders; Nicaragua	5629 pts	Iván Cruz; Mexico	5006 pts
WR world record | AR area record | CR championship record | GR games record | NR national record | OR Olympic record | PB personal best | SB season best | WL world leading (in a given season)

† Exhibition event – no medals awarded.

=== U23 Women ===
Event	Gold		Silver		Bronze	
100 metres (wind: +2.1 m/s)	Lavanya Williams; Jamaica	10.91	Alana Reid; Jamaica	11.05	Frances Colón; Puerto Rico	11.23
200 metres (wind: +3.0 m/s)	Alana Reid; Jamaica	22.29	Lavanya Williams; Jamaica	22.40	Kelia Bentham; Barbados	23.00
400 metres	Andrea Rivera; Puerto Rico	51.52	Kadia Rock; Barbados	51.92	Valeria Pineda; Mexico	52.72
800 metres	Layla Haynes; Barbados	2:07.86	Luana Lewis; Jamaica	2:08.86	Georgina Sosa; Mexico	2:09.38
1500 metres†	Dafne Juárez; Mexico	4:39.81	Aislinn Rojas; Mexico	4:49.20	Aniqah Bailey; Trinidad and Tobago	5:12.55
5000 metres†	Dafne Juárez; Mexico	16:54.52	Fatima Mena; Mexico	17:35.32	Only two competitors	
10,000 metres†	Luz Rocha; Mexico	36:07.93	Fatima Mena; Mexico	36:11.53	Only two competitors	
100 metres hurdles (wind: +0.3 m/s)	Alexis James; Jamaica	13.08	Keishla García; Puerto Rico	13.53	Maya Rollins; Barbados	13.59
400 metres hurdles	Kelly Ann Carr; Jamaica	57.40	Grace Otero; Puerto Rico	58.38	Mariangel Núñez; Costa Rica	60.45
3000 metres steeplechase†	Renata Muñoz; Mexico	11:23.43	Areli Ayala; Mexico	11:46.37	Only two competitors	
4 × 100 metres relay	Puerto Rico; Natalia Pagan; Darelis Domínguez; Legna Echevarría; Frances Colón	44.43	Barbados; Nya Browne; Aniya Nurse; Kelia Bentham; Kishawna Niles	44.60	Mexico; America Trejo; Joselyn Araújo; Daniela Schulz; Nancy Alba	47.86
4 × 400 metres relay†	Puerto Rico; Grace Otero; Génesis Castro; Amanda Andino; Andrea Rivera	3:33.20	Bahamas; Luna Govea; Alisson Martínez; Georgina Sosa; Kenya Maturana	3:39.15	Only two participating teams	
5000 metres walk	Renata Cortes; Mexico	23:50.30	María Fernanda Santiago; Mexico	24:20.12	Aneth Siliézar; Guatemala	25:32.06
High jump	Stephany Martinez; Mexico	1.69 m	Jah'kyla Morton; British Virgin Islands	1.69 m	Ana Isabella González; El Salvador	1.69 m
Pole vault†	Andrea Velasco; Mexico	4.20 m	Sandra Barbosa; Mexico	3.40 m	Only two participants	
Long jump	Janae De Gannes; Trinidad and Tobago	6.58 m	Paola del Real; Mexico	6.09 m	Gianna Paul; Trinidad and Tobago	5.95 m
Triple jump	Paola del Real; Mexico	13.29 m	Keneisha Shelbourne; Trinidad and Tobago	13.18 m	Jade-Ann Dawkins; Jamaica	13.04 m
Shot put	Brittannie Johnson; Jamaica	16.51 m	Kimeka Smith; Jamaica	16.27 m	Ryah Dates; Barbados	15.26 m
Discus throw	Lalenii Grant; Trinidad and Tobago	53.72 m	Brittannie Johnson; Jamaica	52.58 m	Brittannia Johnson; Jamaica	51.72 m
Hammer throw	Yarielis Torres; Puerto Rico	64.05 m	Elvia Canela; Mexico	61.14 m	Sophie Pérez; Guatemala	58.88 m
Javelin throw	Taysha Stubbs; Bahamas	50.36 m	Suerena Alexander; Grenada	47.89 m	Alexia Beltrán; Mexico	46.88 m
Heptathlon	Valeria Gutiérrez; Mexico	4915 pts	Ana Isabella González; El Salvador	4895 pts	Tenique Vincent; Trinidad and Tobago	4878 pts
WR world record | AR area record | CR championship record | GR games record | NR national record | OR Olympic record | PB personal best | SB season best | WL world leading (in a given season)

† Exhibition event – no medals awarded.

=== U23 Mixed ===
Event	Gold		Silver		Bronze	
4 × 100 metres relay	Puerto Rico; Ángel Márquez; Enith Maysonet; Adrián Canales; Frances Colón	41.92	Bahamas; Samalie Farrington; Shatalya Dorsett; Zion Campbell; Ezthia Maycock	42.71	Barbados; Aragorn Straker; Aniya Nurse; Amari Knight; Nya Browne	42.93
4 × 400 metres relay	Jamaica; Antonio Forbes; Oneika Brissett; Jasauna Dennis; Leanna Lewis	3:22.36	Puerto Rico; LeBron Bessick; Amanda Andino; Yan Vázquez; Darelis Domínguez	3:26.91	Mexico; Juan Francisco Ibarra; Susana Montes; Esteban Avena; Kenya Maturana	3:27.99

=== U18 Boys ===
Event	Gold		Silver		Bronze	
100 metres (wind: +1.6 m/s)	Mekhi Guischard-Yearwood; Trinidad and Tobago	10.33	Kai Kristian Kelly; Jamaica	10.34	Jquan Douglas; Trinidad and Tobago	10.48
200 metres (wind: +5.2 m/s)	Eagan Neely; Bahamas	20.84	Jahkye Brewster; Barbados	20.91	Tray Watson; Jamaica	20.96
400 metres	Jason Pitter; Jamaica	45.98	Zachary Wall; Barbados	46.34	Jordan Rehedul; Jamaica	47.12
800 metres	Zarek García; Mexico	1:52.85	Yeray Becerra; Mexico	1:53.59	Sebastián Jiménez; Costa Rica	1:54.33
1500 metres	Enrique Ramírez; Mexico	3:59.87	Zarek García; Mexico	4:00.78	Hendrick Averhoff; Guatemala	4:02.67
3000 metres	Pedro Jaramillo; Mexico	8:37.35	Enrique Ramírez; Mexico	8:41.91	Hendrick Averhoff; Guatemala	9:05.86
110 metres hurdles (91.4 cm) (wind: +2.0 m/s)	Jahcario Wilson; Bahamas	12.94	Jakobi Browne-Smith; Barbados	13.57	Brandon Bennett; Jamaica	13.96
400 metres hurdles (84.0 cm)	Ruheim McIntosh; Jamaica	51.43	Cristobal Higuera; Mexico	52.36	Joan Agüero; Costa Rica	53.72
2000 metres steeplechase (84.0 cm)	Chrisjan Estévez; Puerto Rico	6:27.52	Mauricio Camacho; Mexico	6:29.29	Zahid Ramírez; Mexico	6:31.52
4 × 100 metres relay	Jamaica; Tray Watson; Tyler Morgan; Michael Graham; Kai Kelly	40.07	Bahamas; Terrin Beckles; Jahcario Wilson; Rohman Rolle; Eagan Neely	40.32	Costa Rica; Daniel Liu; Azriel Castro; Dominic Domínguez; Keylor Aguilar	42.18
4 × 400 metres relay	Jamaica; Jordan Rehedul; Ruheim McIntosh; Tiene Barrett; Jason Pitter	3:08.79	Trinidad and Tobago; Brion Scott; Khordae Lewis; Christopher Sammy; Khordel Lewis	3:13.35	Mexico; Leonardo Osorio; Ángel Sarmiento; Roberto Madrid; Sergio Malvaez	3:13.65
5000 metres walk	Elías Gómez; Mexico	22:48.04	Tobías Hun; Guatemala	23:38.67	Jesús Oregón; Mexico	24:13.03
High jump	Selethel Johnson; Jamaica	2.05 m	Nikaro Johnson; Jamaica	2.05 m	Ángel Hernández; Mexico	1.90 m
Pole vault	Carlo Cruz; Mexico	4.90 m	Josué Ortega; Mexico	4.50 m	Emisael Escalona; Puerto Rico	4.20 m
Long jump	Terrin Beckles; Bahamas	7.05 m	Talshawn Edwards; Jamaica	7.03 m	Jazzair Best; Barbados	6.96 m
Triple jump	Antonio Anderson; Jamaica	14.93 m	Jenico Gibson; Bahamas	14.55 m	Talshawn Edwards; Jamaica	14.43 m
Shot put (5 kg)	Jayden Walcott; Barbados	21.82 m	Xhaevion Kelly; Jamaica	18.60 m	Kamari Kennedy; Jamaica	18.04 m
Discus throw (1.5 kg)	Kamari Kennedy; Jamaica	61.53 m	Kazim Telesford; Grenada	55.92 m	Jaafari Shaw; Trinidad and Tobago	54.74 m
Hammer throw (5 kg)	Alejandro de León; Mexico	65.03 m	Joriel López; Puerto Rico	53.15 m	Gael Sánchez; Mexico	53.04 m
Javelin throw (700 g)	Deshawn Smart; Grenada	64.62 m	Ahkeel Williams; Bahamas	58.16 m	Jesús Estrella; Mexico	54.01 m
Decathlon (U18)	Shyiem Phillip; Grenada	6664 pts	Andrés Núñez; Costa Rica	6336 pts	Ángel Botello; Mexico	6065 pts
WR world record | AR area record | CR championship record | GR games record | NR national record | OR Olympic record | PB personal best | SB season best | WL world leading (in a given season)

=== U18 Girls ===
Event	Gold		Silver		Bronze	
100 metres (wind: +1.8 m/s)	Jazae Johnson; Bahamas	11.42	Malayia Duncan; Jamaica	11.54	Rihana Mora; Costa Rica	11.59
200 metres (wind: +6.0 m/s)	Eden Chee-Wah; Trinidad and Tobago	23.10	Tyra Fenton; Antigua and Barbuda	23.26	Jael Peters; Trinidad and Tobago	23.71
400 metres	Shameika McLean; Jamaica	52.37	Eden Chee-Wah; Trinidad and Tobago	52.48	Daniellia Dixon; Jamaica	53.22
800 metres	Alikay Reynolds; Jamaica	2:09.67	Nyla Kerr; Trinidad and Tobago	2:10.68	Cintia Gómez; Costa Rica	2:11.45
1500 metres	Kenya Cuahutle; Mexico	4:45.80	Cintia Gómez; Costa Rica	4:47.24	Nyla Kerr; Trinidad and Tobago	4:53.55
3000 metres	Kenya Cuahutle; Mexico	10:03.00	Sarahi Martínez; Mexico	10:29.17	Emma Gobert; Aruba	12:15.79
100 metres hurdles (76.2 cm) (wind: +0.4 m/s)	Tashana Godfrey; Jamaica	13.30	Rihana Mora; Costa Rica	13.64	Franjeliz de la Cruz; Puerto Rico	14.65
400 metres hurdles	Dailyn Araya; Costa Rica	61.06	Eimy Núñez; Costa Rica	61.24	Paula Díaz; Mexico	61.63
2000 metres steeplechase	Krissia Martínez; El Salvador	7:55.37	Aishling Pérez; Mexico	7:56.86	Ángela Orozco; Mexico	8:09.10
4 × 100 metres relay	Bahamas; Taree Mcintosh-Forbes; Jazae Johnson; Rhayanna Saunders; Keyezra Thomas	45.39	Jamaica; Azaria Harris; Tashana Godfrey; Tawaina Marston; Malayia Duncan	46.11	Costa Rica; Valeria Jara; Camile Gómez; Nahima Allen; Valentina Díaz	48.33
4 × 400 metres relay	Jamaica; Maddison Campbell; Daniellia Dixon; Alikay Reynolds; Shameika McLean	3:37.04	Trinidad and Tobago; Eden Chee Wah; Nyla Kerr; La Queen Welch; Soleil-Marie Caruth	3:44.72	Mexico; Regina Maldonado; Rebeca López; Camila Romero; Paula Díaz	3:45.15
5000 metres walk	Wendy Susano; Mexico	25:03.26	Danae García; Mexico	27:56.78	Aylin Coc; Guatemala	28:45.52
High jump	T'keiya Smith; British Virgin Islands	1.64 m	Lucia Velázquez; Mexico	1.62 m	Stefvanco Henry; Jamaica	1.60 m
Pole vault†	Eva Quiñónez; Mexico	3.50 m	Romina Alcanatara; Mexico	3.30 m	Only two competitors	
Long jump	Zavien Bernard; Jamaica	6.21 m	Jazae Johnson; Bahamas	6.13 m	J'kaiyah Rolle; Bahamas	5.73 m
Triple jump	Zavien Bernard; Jamaica	12.73 m	Caitilyn Smith; Bahamas	11.94 m	Susana Osuna; Mexico	11.48 m
Shot put (3 kg)	Kendra Duany; Mexico	16.98 m	Jamie Lee Tulloch; Jamaica	14.83 m	Milagros Ayon; Mexico	13.80 m
Discus throw	Kendra Duany; Mexico	48.02 m	Zoeyann Plummer; Jamaica	44.25 m	Luisa Enríquez; Mexico	40.26 m
Hammer throw (3 kg)	Alison Salinas; Mexico	64.33 m	Gillian Peña; Puerto Rico	61.55 m	Isis Rodríguez; Mexico	57.22 m
Javelin throw (500 g)	Kimberly Andrade; Mexico	42.86 m	Tatiana Sousa; Bermuda	39.33 m	Abigail Serrano; Mexico	37.58 m
Heptathlon (U18)	Leah López; Mexico	4547 pts	Camila Santamaría; Mexico	4350 pts	Franjeliz de la Cruz; Puerto Rico	4317 pts
WR world record | AR area record | CR championship record | GR games record | NR national record | OR Olympic record | PB personal best | SB season best | WL world leading (in a given season)

† Exhibition event – no medals awarded.

=== U18 Mixed ===
Event	Gold		Silver		Bronze	
4 × 100 metres relay	Bahamas; Rohman Rolle; Jazae Johnson; Aiden Musgrove; Taree Mcintosh-Forbes	43.00	Jamaica; Michael Graham; Tashana Godfrey; Brandon Bennett; Daniela Clarke	43.39	Guatemala; Caleb Meneses; Katia Morales; Gianluca Marsicovetere; Valeria Villavicencio	44.25
4 × 400 metres relay	Jamaica; Jaeden Campbell; Alikay Reynolds; Ruheim McIntosh; Maddison Campbell	3:27.04	Mexico; Leonardo Osorio; Regina Maldonado; Sergio Malvaez; Paula Díaz	3:31.50	Bahamas; Jonathan Higgs; Brianna Bootle; Cordell Munroe; Nevaeh Mackey	3:33.46
