= 2024 World Athletics U20 Championships – Women's 4 × 100 metres relay =

Women's 4 × 100 metres relay at the 2024 World Athletics U20 Championships
- Venue: Estadio Atlético de la VIDENA
- Dates: 30 August 2024 (heats); 31 August 2024 (final)
- Competitors: 99 from 23 nations
- Winning time: 43.39

Medalists
gold medal	Shanova Douglas; Alliah Baker; Briana Campbell; Alana Reid; Sabrina Dockery*	Jamaica
silver medal	Timea Rankl; Lia Thalmann; Chloé Rabac; Alicia Masini	Switzerland
bronze medal	Savannah Blair; Dianna Proctor; Ashley Odiase; Renée Tedga; Kiara Webb*	Canada

The women's 4 × 100 metres relay at the 2024 World Athletics U20 Championships was held at the Estadio Atlético de la VIDENA in Lima, Peru on 30 and 31 August 2024.

== Records ==
U20 standing records prior to the 2024 World Athletics U20 Championships were as follows:

Record	Nation	Mark	Location	Date
World U20 Record	Jamaica	42.59	Cali, Colombia	5 August 2022
Championship Record	Jamaica	42.59	Cali, Colombia	5 August 2022
World U20 Leading	Switzerland	42.91	Willemstad, Curaçao	30 March 2024

== Results ==
=== Heats ===
First 2 of each heat (Q) plus 2 fastest times (q) qualify to Final.

==== Heat 1 ====
Rank	Lane	Nation	Athletes	Time	Notes
1	3	Switzerland	Timea Rankl, Lia Thalmann, Chloé Rabac, Alicia Masini	44.88	Q, SB
2	5	Canada	Savannah Blair, Dianna Proctor, Renée Tedga, Kiara Webb	45.23	Q, SB
3	6	Ukraine	Anna Karandukova, Diana Myroshnichenko, Uliana Stepaniuk, Alina Kyshkina	45.26	q
4	4	Spain	Ericka Maseras, Ivana Peralta, Carla Martínez, Jazmin Romeu	45.84	
5	9	Chile	Sofia Segura, Antonia Ramírez, Catalina Rozas, Blanca Yarur	46.15	
6	8	Ecuador	Camille Romero, Xiomara Ibarra, Génesis Cañola, Marolyn Pastrana	47.43	
–	2	Germany	Philina Schwartz, Sherin Kimuanga, Annika Just, Holly Okuku	DNF	
–	7	Great Britain	Mabel Akande, Kissiwaa Mensah, Faith Akinbileje, Jasmine Wilkins	DQ	TR24.7[L]

==== Heat 2 ====
Rank	Lane	Nation	Athletes	Time	Notes
1	7	United States	Jade Brown, Cynteria James, Avery Lewis, Davenae Fagan	44.22	Q, SB
2	8	Australia	Thewbelle Philp, Olivia Inkster, Olivia Dodds, Aleksandra Stoilova	44.76	Q
3	2	Poland	Oliwia Kasprzak, Jagoda Żukowska, Inga Kanicka, Julia Adamczyk	45.00	q
4	6	India	Ruiula Bhonsle, Neole Cornelio, Abinaya Rajarajan, Sudheeksha Vadluri	45.31	NU20R
5	4	South Africa	Lana Oberholzer, Kaili Botje, Roline Louw, Atang Naane	46.61	SB
6	3	Peru	Luciana Cateriano, Bianca Conroy, María Alondra, Cayetana Chirinos	49.31	
–	5	Trinidad and Tobago	Kenniyah Guischard-Yearwood, Janae De Gannes, Akira Malaver, Alexxe Henry	DQ	TR24.7[L]
–	9	Hungary		DNS	

==== Heat 3 ====
Rank	Lane	Nation	Athletes	Time	Notes
1	8	Jamaica	Sabrina Dockery, Alliah Baker, Briana Campbell, Alana Reid	43.81	Q
2	9	Puerto Rico	Legna Echevarria, Frances Colon, Amanda Andino, Karina Franceschi	45.28	Q, NU20R
3	6	Italy	Elisa Marcello, Agnese Musica, Melissa Turchi, Rachele Torchio	45.55	
4	4	Slovenia	Lucija Potnik, Pika Bikar Kern, Karolina Zbičajnik, Lina Hribar	45.63	NU20R
5	7	Botswana	Wedu Matiwe, Same Mhutsiwa, Kelebonye Otela, Sethunya Majama	46.43	NU20R
–	5	Brazil	Larissa Souza, Vanessa dos Santos, Hemily De Jesus, Hakelly da Silva	DQ	TR24.7[L]
–	3	France	Nina Thevenin, Shana Lambourde, Vanessa Lokuli, Romane Colletin	DQ	TR24.7[L]
–	2	Nigeria	Justina Eyakpobeyan, Prestina Ochonogor, Favour Onyah, Precious Nzeakor	DQ	TR24.7[L]

=== Final ===
Rank	Lane	Nation	Athletes	Time	Notes
1st place, gold medalist(s)	7	Jamaica	Shanova Douglas, Alliah Baker, Briana Campbell, Alana Reid	43.49	SB
2nd place, silver medalist(s)	8	Switzerland	Timea Rankl, Lia Thalmann, Chloé Rabac, Alicia Masini	44.06	NU20R
3rd place, bronze medalist(s)	9	Canada	Savannah Blair, Dianna Proctor, Ashley Odiase, Renée Tedga	44.60	SB
4	2	Poland	Oliwia Zimoląg, Jagoda Żukowska, Inga Kanicka, Julia Adamczyk	44.95	
5	4	Puerto Rico	Legna Echevarria, Frances Colon, Amanda Andino, Karina Franceschi	45.61	
6	3	Ukraine	Anna Karandukova, Diana Myroshnichenko, Uliana Stepaniuk, Alina Kyshkina	45.64	
–	5	Australia	Aleksandra Stoilova, Torrie Lewis, Olivia Inkster, Jessica Milat,	DQ	TR24.7[L]
–	6	United States	Jade Brown, Cynteria James, Avery Lewis, Taylor Snaer	DQ	TR24.7[L]
