= Alana Reid =

Jamaican athlete

Personal information
- Nationality: Jamaican
- Born: 20 January 2005 (age 21)

Sport
- Sport: Athletics
- Events: 60 metres, 100 m, 200 m
- Club: Star Athletics, Hurdle Mechanic
- Coached by: Corey Bennett, Dennis Mitchell, Boogie Johnson

Achievements and titles
- Personal bests: 60 m: 7.29 (Kingston 2022); 100 m: 10.92 NU20R (Kingston 2023); 200 m: 22.29 (Kingston 2026)
Medal record
Women's athletics
Representing Jamaica
Commonwealth Games
Gold medal – first place	2026 Glasgow	4×100m relay
Bronze medal – third place	2026 Glasgow	200 m
NACAC U23 Championships
Gold medal – first place	2026 Tlaxcala	200 m
Silver medal – second place	2026 Tlaxcala	100 m
World U20 Championships
Gold medal – first place	2024 Lima	100 m
Gold medal – first place	2024 Lima	4×100 m relay
Bronze medal – third place	2022 Cali	200 m
Pan American U20 Championships
Gold medal – first place	2025 Asunción	4×100 m relay
Gold medal – first place	2023 Mayagüez	100 m
Silver medal – second place	2023 Mayagüez	4×100 m relay
CARIFTA Games (U20)
Gold medal – first place	2023 Nassau	100 m
Gold medal – first place	2023 Nassau	4×100 m relay
NACAC U18 Championships
Gold medal – first place	2021 San José	200 m
Gold medal – first place	2021 San José	4×100 m relay

Alana Reid (born 20 January 2005) is a Jamaican athlete who competes as a sprinter. She won the 200 metres title at the Jamaican Athletics Championships in 2026 and the bronze medal at the 2026 Commonwealth Games.

At the age of 17, while attending Hydel High School, she won the bronze medal in the 200 metres at the 2022 World Under-20 Championships. She later won gold at the 2024 World Athletics U20 Championships over 100 metres. Reid is the Jamaican junior record holder for the women's 100 metres.

== Early life ==
Alana Reid attended Hydel High School in Jamaica, where she trained under head coach Corey Bennett. In March 2023, she signed a letter of intent confirming she would attend the University of Oregon, but declined to follow through deciding instead to go pro.

== Career ==
=== 2022 ===
As a 17-year-old, Alana Reid was a 200 metres bronze medallist at the 2022 World Under-20 Championships held in Cali, Colombia, running a personal best time of 22.95 seconds.

=== 2023 ===
In March 2023 at the ISSA/GraceKennedy Boys and Girls Championships held at the national stadium in Kingston, she ran a personal best of 11.16 s in the 100 metres semi-final, just 0.03 s off the Veronica Campbell Brown’s championship record from 2001. In the final Reid ran 10.92 s to set a new national junior record, beating the 10.95 s set by Tina Clayton in 2022. It made her the fifth-fastest junior athlete of all time, behind only Katrin Krabbe (10.89), Marlies Oelsner (10.88), and the United States' Tamari Davis (10.83) and Sha'Carri Richardson (10.75). It also placed her eleventh on the Jamaican all-time list. Prior to the race, Reid had predicted to her coach Corey Bennett that she would run sub 11-seconds.

=== 2024 ===
In April 2024, she was selected as part of the Jamaican team for the 2024 World Athletics Relays in Nassau, Bahamas. She competed in the 4 x 100 metres relay at the 2024 Paris Olympics as part of the Jamaican team that placed fifth overall. She then won gold in the 100 metres at the 2024 World Athletics U20 Championships in Lima, Peru in August 2024. She also won gold in the 4 × 100 m relay at the Championships.

Athletics Weekly designated Alana the "2024 International U20 female Athlete of the Year" for her outstanding accomplishments at the U20 Championships.

=== 2025 ===
Formerly a member of Star Athletics Club in Florida, in early 2025 she arrived in Arkansas where she moved to train alongside fellow Jamaicans Ackera Nugent and Nickisha Pryce in the Hurdles Mechanics group led by Lawrence Johnson. On 24 April 2025, she was named in the Jamaican team for the 2025 World Athletics Relays in Guangzhou, China in May 2025. In June 2025, Reid was a finalist over 100 m at the Senior Jamaican Championships having run 11.02 seconds in the semi-final. Reid was named as an ambassador for the 2025 Junior Pan American Games in Asunción, Paraguay where she was a finalist in the 100 metres.

=== 2026 ===
In April 2026, she ran a personal best of 22.89 seconds in the 200 metres at the Velocity Fest meet in Kingston. On 21 June, she won her first senior national title at the 2026 Jamaican Athletics Championships over 200 metres, running a new personal best of 22.29 seconds. In July 2026, she won the silver medal in the 100 m at the 2026 NACAC U23 Championships behind compatriot Lavanya Williams. Later at the championships she won the gold medal ahead of Williams in the 200 m final. She was named in the Jamaica team for the 2026 Commonwealth Games, winning the bronze medal in the 200 metres final on 31 July. Later at the Games, she won a gold medal in the women's 4 × 100 m relay.

== Personal life ==
Reid is the daughter of Karen Chisholm and Jamaican former football international Garfield Reid.

== Statistics ==
Grand Slam Track results
Slam	Race group	Event	Pl.	Time	Prize money
2025 Kingston Slam	Short sprints	100 m	6th	11.47	US$15,000
2025 Kingston Slam	Short sprints	200 m	6th	24.02	US$15,000
