= NACAC U18 Championships in Athletics =

North American bi-annual championship

The NACAC U18 Championships in Athletics is an bi-annual championships to athletes under-18 years of age in the year of competition held between the member associations of the North American, Central American and Caribbean Athletic Association (NACAC). The inaugural edition took place in 2019 in Queretaro, Mexico.

== Editions ==
Edition	Year	City	Country	Date	Venue	No. of Events
1st	2019	Querétaro	Mexico	July 5–7	Parque Queretaro 2000 Stadium	39
2nd	2021	Costa Rica	Costa Rica	July 9–11	Estadio Nacional	40
3rd	2023	Costa Rica	Costa Rica	July 21–23	Estadio Nacional	42
4th	2026	Tlaxcala	Mexico	July 10–12	Estadio Una Nueva Historia	

== Championships records ==
=== Men ===
Event	Record	Athlete	Nationality	Date	Meet	Place	Ref.
100 m	10.42 (+1.6 m/s)	Alicke Cranston	Jamaica	9 July 2021	2021 Championships	San José, Costa Rica	
200 m	20.82 A (+0.5 m/s)	Rajay Morris	Jamaica	7 July 2019	2019 Championships	Queretaro, Mexico	
400 m	46.36 A	Luis Avilés	Mexico	6 July 2019	2019 Championships	Queretaro, Mexico	
800 m	1:52.48 A	Abdullahi Hassan	Canada	6 July 2019	2019 Championships	Queretaro, Mexico	
1500 m	4:12.63 A	Matthew Larkin	Canada	5 July 2019	2019 Championships	Queretaro, Mexico	
3000 m	8:42.71 A	Iker Sánchez	Mexico	5 July 2019	2019 Championships	Queretaro, Mexico	
110 m hurdles (91.4 cm)	13.70 A (+0.8 m/s)	Dashaun Jackson	Jamaica	5 July 2019	2019 Championships	Queretaro, Mexico	
400 m hurdles (84.0 cm)	51.75	Trevoy Smith	Jamaica	21 July 2023	2023 Championships	San José, Costa Rica	
2000 m steeplechase (91.0 cm)	6:10.97	Paulo Gómez González	Costa Rica	11 July 2021	2021 Championships	San José, Costa Rica	
High jump	2.14 m A	Romaine Beckford	Jamaica	5 July 2019	2019 Championships	Queretaro, Mexico	
Pole vault	4.65 m A	Josué Daniel García	Mexico	5 July 2019	2019 Championships	Queretaro, Mexico	
Long jump	7.56 m A (+1.1 m/s)	Kavian Kerr	Jamaica	5 July 2019	2019 Championships	Queretaro, Mexico	
Triple jump	16.02 m (±0.0 m/s)	Jaydon Hibbert	Jamaica	9 July 2021	2021 Championships	San José, Costa Rica	
Shot put (5 kg)	20.96 m A	Ralford Mullings	Jamaica	6 July 2019	2019 Championships	Queretaro, Mexico	
Discus throw (1.5 kg)	62.34 m A	Ralford Mullings	Jamaica	5 July 2019	2019 Championships	Queretaro, Mexico	
Hammer throw (5 kg)	69.89 m A	Aldo Zavala	Mexico	6 July 2019	2019 Championships	Queretaro, Mexico	
Javelin throw (700 g)	67.96 m	Nathaniel Zervos	Bahamas	9 July 2021	2021 Championships	San José, Costa Rica	
10,000 m walk (track)	43:09.45 A	Cesar Cordova	Mexico	5/7 July 2019	2019 Championships	Queretaro, Mexico	
4 × 100 m relay	40.60	Oshane Blackwood; Orlando Wint; Alicke Cranston; Andre Harris	Jamaica	10 July 2021	2021 Championships	San José, Costa Rica	

=== Women ===
Event	Record	Athlete	Nationality	Date	Meet	Place	Ref.
100 m	11.11 A (+1.5 m/s)	Briana Williams	Jamaica	5 July 2019	2019 Championships	Queretaro, Mexico	
200 m	23.78 (−0.1 m/s)	Alana Reid	Jamaica	11 July 2021	2021 Championships	San José, Costa Rica	
400 m	53.92 A	Caitlyn Bobb	Bermuda	6 July 2019	2019 Championships	Queretaro, Mexico	
800 m	2:10.28 A	Lorena Rangel	Mexico	6 July 2019	2019 Championships	Queretaro, Mexico	
1500 m	4:35.01	Abby Lewis	Canada	23 July 2023	2023 Championships	San José, Costa Rica	
3000 m	10:01.67	Abby Lewis	Canada	21 July 2023	2023 Championships	San José, Costa Rica	
100 m hurdles (76.0 cm)	13.19 A (+0.8 m/s)	Crystal Morrison	Jamaica	7 July 2019	2019 Championships	Queretaro, Mexico	
400 m hurdles (76.0 cm)	56.99	Michelle Smith	U.S. Virgin Islands	21 July 2023	2023 Championships	San José, Costa Rica	
2000 m steeplechase	7:15.31 A	Katelyn Stewart-Barnett	Canada	5 July 2019	2019 Championships	Queretaro, Mexico	
Long jump	6.11 m (+1.7 m/s)	Janae De Gannes	Trinidad and Tobago	22 July 2023	2023 Championships	San José, Costa Rica	
5000 m walk (track)	23:45.69 A	Sofia Ramos	Mexico	5/7 July 2019	2019 Championships	Queretaro, Mexico	
