= CARIFTA Games =

Annual athletics competition

The CARIFTA Games is an annual athletics competition founded by the Caribbean Free Trade Association (CARIFTA). The games were first held in 1972 and consist of track and field events including sprint races, hurdles, middle distance track events, jumping and throwing events, and relays. The Games has two age categories: under-17 (under-18 until 2017) and under-20. Only countries associated with CARIFTA may compete in the competition.

== History ==
In 1972, Austin Sealy, the president of the Amateur Athletic Association of Barbados, inaugurated the CARIFTA Games to mark the transition from the Caribbean Free Trade Association (CARIFTA) to the Caribbean Community (CARICOM). CARIFTA was meant to enhance relations between the English-speaking countries of the Caribbean after the dissolution of the West Indies Federation, but the CARIFTA Games took that idea a step further, including the French and Dutch Antilles in an annual junior track and field championship meet.

The meet normally runs over three days during the Easter period and includes over 150 separate events. The Games has two age categories for boys and girls: under-17 and under-20, the latter in line with the International Association of Athletics Federations (IAAF) guidelines for junior athletes. The meet is run entirely under IAAF rules.

According to IAAF President, Lamine Diack, CARIFTA is "on par with the World Championships." The meet is considered one of the best development meets in world athletics. Having started out on grass tracks, with athletes staying in schools or other similar temporary shelter, the CARIFTA Games have come a long way. College and university coaches and scouts from the United States make their way to the Games each year, in a bid to identify up-and-coming athletes.

The Games have produced world record holders Usain Bolt, Darrel Brown, World and Olympic champions such as Veronica Campbell Brown of Jamaica, Kim Collins of St Kitts-Nevis and Pauline Davis-Thompson of the Bahamas, Alleyne Francique of Grenada and Obadele Thompson of Barbados. CARIFTA has spawned administrators like Dean Greenaway, President of the British Virgin Islands Athletics Association.

In the early years, a handful of territories (Barbados, Trinidad & Tobago, Bahamas, Martinique, Guadeloupe, Bermuda) had facilities appropriate for hosting what really is a world-class meet. Since 2000, though, Grenada, St Kitts-Nevis and St Lucia have built brand new stadia and hosted the CARIFTA Games. The Games have also been held on Tobago and in Montego Bay, Jamaica, which became the 14th different venue in 2011.

The CARIFTA Games are normally sponsored by regional companies including the National Gas Company of Trinidad & Tobago Ltd and Guardian Holdings. In 2009, telecommunications company, LIME Caribbean signed on as a presenting sponsor, providing finance to the local organising committee, direct assistance to national teams and live coverage of the Games on TV across the Caribbean, as well as via Internet streaming.

The Games are hosted directly under the auspices of the North and Central American and Caribbean Confederation of World Athletics, more commonly known as NACAC. Each country may enter two athletes per event and up to six athletes may be entered for relay events (with two acting as substitutes) and three athletes in the combined events such as pentathlon or heptathlon.

== Games ==
Edition	Year	City	Country	Date	Venue	No. of Events	Top Team
1st	1972	(Barbados) Bridgetown	Barbados	1–4 April		23	Jamaica
2nd	1973	(Trinidad and Tobago) Port of Spain	Trinidad and Tobago	4–5 May		34	Jamaica
3rd	1974	(Jamaica) Kingston	Jamaica	13–15 April	Independence Park	34	Jamaica
4th	1975	(Bermuda) Hamilton	Bermuda	29–31 March		36	Bermuda
5th	1976	Nassau	Bahamas	19–20 April		39	Jamaica
6th	1977	Bridgetown	Barbados	25–26 April		39	Jamaica
7th	1978	Nassau	Bahamas	27–28 March		39	Jamaica
8th	1979	Kingston	Jamaica	20–22 April	Independence Park	42	Jamaica
9th	1980	Hamilton	Bermuda	3–4 May		48	Bahamas
10th	1981	Nassau	Bahamas	20–21 April	Thomas A. Robinson Stadium	48	Bahamas
11th	1982	Kingston	Jamaica	10–12 April	Independence Park	52	Jamaica
12th	1983	Fort-de-France	Martinique	2–4 April		52	Bahamas
13th	1984	Nassau	Bahamas	21–23 April		52	Bahamas
14th	1985	Bridgetown	Barbados	7–9 April		52	Jamaica
15th	1986	Les Abymes	Guadeloupe	29–31 March		52	Jamaica
16th	1987	Port of Spain	Trinidad and Tobago	18–20 April		52	Jamaica
17th	1988	Kingston	Jamaica	2–4 April	Independence Park	52	Jamaica
18th	1989	Bridgetown	Barbados	25–27 March		50	Jamaica
19th	1990	Kingston	Jamaica	14–16 April	Independence Park	52	Jamaica
20th	1991	Port of Spain	Trinidad and Tobago	30 March 30 – 1 April		53	Jamaica
21st	1992	Nassau	Bahamas	18–20 April		53	Jamaica
22nd	1993	Fort-de-France	Martinique	10–11 April		55	Jamaica
23rd	1994	Bridgetown	Barbados	2–4 April		58	Jamaica
24th	1995	George Town	Cayman Islands	15–17 April		58	Jamaica
25th	1996	Kingston	Jamaica	6–8 April	Independence Park	58	Jamaica
26th	1997	Bridgetown	Barbados	4–6 April	National Stadium	58	Jamaica
27th	1998	Port of Spain	Trinidad and Tobago	11–13 April		62	Jamaica
28th	1999	Fort-de-France	Martinique	3–5 April		63	Jamaica
29th	2000	St. George's	Grenada	22–24 April	National Stadium	61	Jamaica
30th	2001	Bridgetown	Barbados	14–16 April		62	Jamaica
31st	2002	Nassau	Bahamas	March 30 – April 1	Robinson National Stadium	66	Jamaica
32nd	2003	Port of Spain	Trinidad and Tobago	19–21 April	Hasely Crawford National Stadium	66	Jamaica
33rd	2004	Hamilton	Bermuda	9–11 April	National Stadium	66	Jamaica
34th	2005	Bacolet	Trinidad and Tobago	26–28 March	Dwight Yorke Stadium	66	Jamaica
35th	2006	Les Abymes	Guadeloupe	15–17 April	René Serge Nabajoth Stadium	66	Jamaica
36th	2007	Providenciales	Turks and Caicos Islands	7–9 April	National Stadium	66	Jamaica
37th	2008	Basseterre	St Kitts and Nevis	22–24 March	Silver Jubilee Stadium	66	Jamaica
38th	2009	Vieux Fort	St Lucia	10–13 April	George Odlum National Stadium	66	Jamaica
39th	2010	George Town	Cayman Islands	3–5 April	Truman Bodden Sports Complex	66	Jamaica
40th	2011	Montego Bay	Jamaica	23–25 April	Montego Bay Sports Complex	66	Jamaica
41st	2012	Hamilton	Bermuda	6–9 April	National Stadium	66	Jamaica
42nd	2013	Nassau	Bahamas	29 March – 1 April	Robinson National Stadium	66	Jamaica
43rd	2014	Fort-de-France	Martinique	19–21 April	Stade Pierre Aliker	66	Jamaica
44th	2015	Sugar City	St Kitts and Nevis	4–6 April	Silver Jubilee Stadium	66	Jamaica
45th	2016	St. George's	Grenada	26–28 March	National Stadium	66	Jamaica
46th	2017	Willemstad	Curaçao	15–17 April	Ergilio Hato Stadium	66	Jamaica
47th	2018	Nassau	Bahamas	31 March – 2 April	Thomas Robinson Stadium	66	Jamaica
48th	2019	George Town	Cayman Islands	20–22 April	Truman Bodden Sports Complex	66	Jamaica
49th	2022	Kingston	Jamaica	16–18 April	Independence Park	66	Jamaica
50th	2023	Nassau	Bahamas	7–9 April	Thomas Robinson Stadium	68	Jamaica
51st	2024	St. George's	Grenada	30 March – 1 April	Kirani James Athletic Stadium	68	Jamaica
52nd	2025	Port of Spain	Trinidad and Tobago	19–21 April	Hasely Crawford Stadium	68	Jamaica
53rd	2026	St. George's	Grenada	4–6 April	Kirani James Athletic Stadium	68	Jamaica

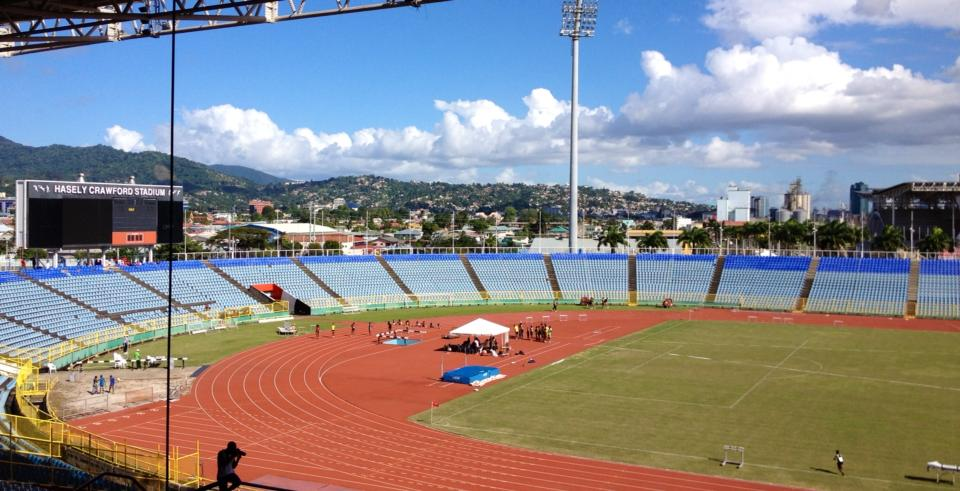
Hasely Crawford Stadium

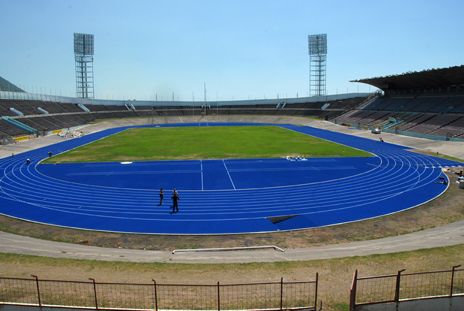
Independence Park

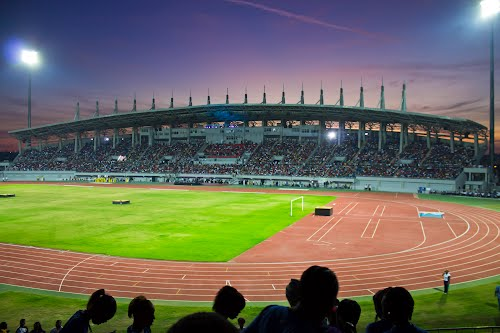
Thomas Robinson Stadium

== Medal Totals Since 1990 ==
As of 2024

Rank	Nation	Gold	Silver	Bronze	Total
1	Jamaica	900	606	388	1,894
2	Bahamas	194	261	306	761
3	Trinidad and Tobago	181	242	259	682
4	Barbados	130	176	230	536
5	Martinique	71	88	118	277
6	Grenada	58	70	87	215
7	Guadeloupe	49	64	85	198
8	Antigua and Barbuda	31	13	27	71
9	Guyana	30	27	32	89
10	Bermuda	25	42	49	116
11	Cayman Islands	15	18	39	72
12	Saint Lucia	12	28	21	61
13	British Virgin Islands	12	14	15	41
14	Saint Kitts and Nevis	10	16	20	46
15	Dominica	9	13	15	37
16	French Guiana	7	7	6	20
17	U.S. Virgin Islands	7	1	1	9
18	Turks and Caicos Islands	6	7	10	23
19	Suriname	5	4	7	16
20	Belize	5	2	2	9
21	U.S. Virgin Islands	3	5	9	17
22	Curaçao	3	3	11	17
23	Saint Vincent and the Grenadines	2	8	7	17
24	Anguilla	2	1	5	8
25	Netherlands Antilles	0	5	6	11
26	Aruba	0	4	3	7
27	Haiti	0	1	2	3
28	Turks and Caicos Islands	0	0	4	4
Totals (28 entries)		1,767	1,726	1,764	5,257

== CARIFTA Games Records ==
Jamaica has dominated the medals table at CARIFTA over the years. So too the record books. They hold records in 10 of the 21 Under-20 men's events contested all-time at CARIFTA, and hold or share 11 of the 17 Under-20 women's records. At the junior level, Jamaican boys own nine of the 17 records, whilst their girls possess a remarkable 10 of 16 marks in the Under-17 division. The oldest CARIFTA record in the books, though (at least for events still being contested in the modern Games), belongs to a Bermudian, Sonya Smith, whose Under-20 Javelin Throw performance of 53.98m has been on the books since 1979. The oldest boys' record is 15.03 m, the winning distance for Lyndon Sands of the Bahamas in the 1980 Under-17 Triple Jump.

Kareem Streete-Thompson went on to become one of the world's leading horizontal jumpers, but his CARIFTA performances have earned legendary status. In 1989, he set an Under-17 Long Jump record with a leap of 7.83 m, and a year later his 7.94 m was an Under-20 record, in his first year competing at that level for Cayman Islands. Both marks remain untouched. The women's horizontal jump records are almost as long-lived, Jackie Edwards' 1987 mark of 6.14 m was the Under-17 winning distance that year, and Daphne Saunders' leap of 6.93 m won her the 1989 title. Both ladies are from the Bahamas.

=== Men Under 20 ===
Event	Record	Athlete	Nationality	Date	Games	Ref.	Video
100 m	10.11 (+1.2 m/s)	Yohan Blake	Jamaica	7 April 2007	2007 Providenciales		
200 m	19.93 (+1.4 m/s)	Usain Bolt	Jamaica	11 April 2004	2004 Hamilton		
400 m	45.02	Kirani James	Grenada	3 April 2010	2010 Georgetown		
800 m	1:48.95	Kenroy Levy	Jamaica	April 1987	1987 Port of Spain		
1500 m	3:47.56	Gavyn Nero	Trinidad and Tobago	11 April 2009	2009 Vieux Fort		
3000 m	8:48.20	Trevor Small	Barbados	April 1976	1976 Nassau		
5000 m	14:34.34	Kemoy Campbell	Jamaica	5 April 2010	2010 George Town		
110 m hurdles (99.1 cm)	13.19 (−1.4 m/s)	Shaquane Gordon	Jamaica	21 April 2025	2025 Port of Spain		
300 m hurdles	41.00	Clive Barriffe	Jamaica	5 May 1973	1973 Port of Spain		
400 m hurdles	49.76	Jehue Gordon	Trinidad and Tobago	4 April 2010	2010 Georgetown		
3000 m steeplechase	9:59.62	Junior Mitchell	Trinidad and Tobago	31 March 1991	1991 Port of Spain		
High jump	2.22 m	Jermaine Francis	Saint Kitts and Nevis	17 April 2017	2017 Willemstad		
Pole vault	5.30 m	Brenden Vanderpool	Bahamas	30 March 2024	2024 St. George's		
Long jump	7.94 m	Kareem Streete-Thompson	Cayman Islands	20 April 1990	1990 Kingston		
Triple jump	16.46 m (+0.5 m/s)	Jaydon Hibbert	Jamaica	18 April 2022	2022 Kingston		
Shot put (6 kg)	20.02 m	Kobe Lawrence	Jamaica	18 April 2022	2022 Kingston		
Discus throw (1.75 kg)	66.41 m	Roje Stona	Jamaica	15 April 2017	2017 Willemstad		
Javelin throw (800 g)	79.89 m	Keyshawn Strachan	Bahamas	16 April 2022	2022 Kingston		
Heptathlon	5623 pts	Maurice Smith	Jamaica	April 1999	1999 Fort-de-France		
Octathlon	5839 pts	Shakiel Chattoo	Jamaica	4–5 April 2015	2015 Basseterre		
Octathlon	100m (wind) / Long jump (wind) / Shot put / 400m / 110m H (wind) / High jump / Javelin / 1000m; 11.17 (−2.4 m/s) / 6.65 m (+0.8 m/s) / 12.26 m / 49.30 / 14.61 (−2.1 m/s) / 1.97 m / 45.19 m / 3.04.15						
Decathlon (U20)	6522 pts	Tyrique Vincent	Trinidad and Tobago	19–20 April 2025	2025 Port of Spain		
Decathlon (U20)	100m / Long jump / Shot put / High jump / 400m / 110m H / Discus / Pole vault / Javelin / 1500m; 11.32 (−1.1 m/s) / 6.99 m (−1.3 m/s) / 12.97 m / 1.94 m / 52.51 / 14.35 (−0.5 m/s) / 34.63 m / 2.85 m / 44.77 m / 5:13.57						
4 × 100 m relay	39.15	Bouwahjgie Nkrumie; Bryan Levell; Sandrey Davison; DeAndre Daley	Jamaica	17 April 2022	2022 Kingston		
4 × 400 m relay	3:05.49	Nadal Seale; Aidan Moore; Jahkye Brewster; Shamari Greenige-Lewis	Barbados	6 April 2026	2026 St. George's		

=== Women Under 20 ===
Event	Record	Athlete	Nationality	Date	Games	Ref.
100 m	11.03 (heat)	Aleen Bailey	Jamaica	11 April 1998	1998 Port of Spain	
100 m	11.03 (heat)	Tamicka Clarke	Bahamas	11 April 1998	1998 Port of Spain	
200 m	22.11 (+1.9 m/s)	Shanoya Douglas	Jamaica	6 April 2026	2026 St. George's	
400 m	51.30	Sonita Sutherland	Jamaica	15 April 2006	2006 Les Abymes	
800 m	2:05.90	Natoya Goule	Jamaica	24 March 2008	2008 Basseterre	
1500 m	4:27.48	Natoya Goule	Jamaica	10 April 2009	2009 Vieux Fort	
3000 m	9:50.56	Janice Turner	Jamaica	31 March 1991	1991 Port of Spain	
100 m hurdles (83.8 cm)	13.06 (+0.9 m/s)	Alexis James	Jamaica	10 April 2023	2023 Nassau	
400 m hurdles	56.22	Shiann Salmon	Jamaica	1 April 2018	2018 Nassau	
High jump	1.87 m	Jeanelle Scheper	Saint Lucia	1 April 2013	2013 Nassau	
Pole vault	3.20 m	Naima Caprice	Martinique	4 April 2026	2026 St. George's	
Long jump	6.50 m (+0.5 m/s)	Janae De Gannes	Trinidad and Tobago	1 April 2024	2024 St. George's	
Triple jump	13.40 m (+1.4 m/s)	Yanis David	Guadeloupe	3 April 2015	2015 Basseterre	
Shot put (4.0 kg)	17.44 m	Marla-Kay Lampart	Jamaica	20 March 2025	2025 Port of Spain	
Discus throw (1.0 kg)	55.06 m	Jackie Henrianne Pri Hyman	Guadeloupe	30 March 2024	2024 St. George's	
Javelin throw 600g old spec. (-1998)	53.98 m	Sonya Smith	Bermuda	20 April 1979	1979 Kingston	
Javelin throw 600g new spec. (1999-)	51.13 m	Candesha Scott	Grenada	28 March 2016	2016 St. George’s	
Pentathlon	3935 pts	Salcia Slack	Jamaica	23 March 2008	2008 Basseterre	
Heptathlon	5231 pts	Ayesha Champagnie	Jamaica	4–5 April 2015	2015 Basseterre	
Heptathlon	100m H / High jump / Shot put / 200m / Long jump / Javelin / 800m; 14.49 (+1.2 m/s) / 1.61 m / 13.16 m / 25.69 (+1.3 m/s) / 5.43 m (+0.4 m/s) / 44.37 m / 2:39.27					
4 × 100 m relay	42.58	Serena Cole; Tina Clayton; Brianna Lyston; Tia Clayton	Jamaica	17 April 2022	2022 Kingston	
4 × 400 m relay	3:31.47	Olivia James; Janieve Russell; Simoya Campbell; Chrisann Gordon	Jamaica	25 April 2011	2011 Montego Bay	

=== Mixed U-20 ===
Event	Record	Athlete	Nationality	Date	Games	Ref.
4 × 400 m relay	3:20.79	Tishawn Easton; Akeela Dover; Malachi Austin; Tianna Springer	Guyana	5 April 2026	2026 St. George's	

=== Boys Under 18 ===
Event	Record	Athlete	Nationality	Date	Games	Ref.
100 m	10.27 (+1.9 m/s)	Raheem Chambers	Jamaica	20 April 2014	2014 Fort-de-France	
200 m	20.84 (+1.2 m/s)	Odean Skeen	Jamaica	5 April 2010	2010 Georgetown	
400 m	46.64	Christopher Taylor	Jamaica	4 April 2015	2015 Basseterre	
800 m	1:49.88	Jonathan Jones	Barbados	28 March 2016	2016 St George's	
1500 m	4:00.04	Theon O'Connor	Jamaica	7 April 2007	2007 Providenciales	
3000 m	8:46.49	Kemoy Campbell	Jamaica	8 April 2007	2007 Providenciales	
5000 m	16:11.01	Kendell Simon	Grenada	4 April 1999	1999 Fort-de-France	
100 m hurdles	12.88	Aaron Wilmore	Bahamas	24 March 2008	2008 Basseterre	
110 m hurdles (91.4 cm)	13.32 (+1.3 m/s) (heat)	Jaheel Hyde	Jamaica	21 April 2014	2014 Fort-de-France	
110 m hurdles (91.4 cm)	13.1 h NWI	Tavonte Mott	Bahamas	6 April 2015	2015 Basseterre	
400 m hurdles (0.84 m)	51.21	Jaheel Hyde	Jamaica	20 April 2014	2014 Fort-de-France	
High jump	2.13 m	Raymond Higgs	Bahamas	7 April 2007	2007 Providenciales	
Long jump	7.83 m	Kareem Streete-Thompson	Cayman Islands	March 1989	1989 Bridgetown	
Triple jump	16.33 m (+2.0 m/s)	Miguel van Assen	Suriname	19 April 2014	2014 Fort-de-France	
Shot put (5.0 kg)	18.17 m	Daniel Cope	Jamaica	16 April 2017	2017 Willemstad	
Discus throw (1.5 kg)	60.43 m	Phillipe Barnet	Jamaica	26 March 2016	2016 St. George’s	
Javelin throw (700 g)	76.50 m	Tyriq Hosford	Trinidad and Tobago	16 April 2017	2017 Willemstad	
4 × 100 m relay	39.97	Michali Everett; Tyreke Wilson; Xavier Nairne; Michael Stephens	Jamaica	16 April 2017	2017 Willemstad	
4 × 400 m relay	3:12.07	Leonardo Ledgister; Devaughn Ellington; Jauavney James; Christopher Taylor	Jamaica	6 April 2015	2015 Basseterre	

=== Girls Under 18 ===
Event	Record	Athlete	Nationality	Date	Games	Ref.
100 m	11.28 (heat)	Raneika Bean	Bermuda	11 April 1998	1998 Port of Spain	
200 m	23.03 (heat)	Anneisha McLaughlin	Jamaica	31 March 2002	2002 Nassau	
400 m	53.36	Shaunae Miller	Bahamas	3 April 2010	2010 Georgetown	
800 m	2:09.59	Natoya Goule	Jamaica	17 April 2006	2006 Les Abymes	
1500 m	4:32.70	Natoya Goule	Jamaica	15 April 2006	2006 Les Abymes	
3000 m	10:00.23	Janill Williams	Antigua and Barbuda	4 April 1999	1999 Fort-de-France	
100 m hurdles (76.2 cm)	13.16 (−2.1 m/s)	Britany Anderson	Jamaica	17 April 2017	2017 Willemstad	
300 m hurdles	41.30	Janieve Russell	Jamaica	12 April 2009	2009 Vieux Fort	
400 m hurdles (76.2 cm)	58.95	Sanique Walker	Jamaica	16 April 2017	2017 Willemstad	
High jump	1.85 m	Akela Jones	Barbados	3 April 2010	2010 Georgetown	
Long jump	6.14 m	Jackie Edwards	Bahamas	April 1987	1987 Port of Spain	
Long jump	6.24 m NWI	Yanis Esméralda David	/Guadeloupe	20 April 2014	2014 Fort-de-France	
Triple jump	13.10 m (+1.5 m/s)	Yanis Esméralda David	/Guadeloupe	21 April 2014	2014 Fort-de-France	
Shot put (3.0 kg)	16.31 m	Sahjay Stevens	Jamaica	4 April 2015	2015 Basseterre	
Discus throw (1.0 kg)	46.47 m	Janel Fullerton	Jamaica	19 April 2014	2014 Fort-de-France	
Javelin throw (500 g)	49.66 m	Shanee Angol	Dominica	21 April 2014	2014 Fort-de-France	
Javelin throw 600g old spec. (-1998)	43.66 m	Francette Pognon	Martinique	April 1997	1997 Bridgetown	
Javelin throw 600g new spec. (1999-)	42.90 m	Deandra Dottin	Barbados	9 April 2007	2007 Providenciales	
4 × 100 m relay	44.80	Shellece Clarke; Shanice Reid; Natalliah White; Kimone Shaw	Jamaica	20 April 2014	2014 Fort-de-France	
4 × 400 m relay	3:37.65	Taqece Duggan; Junell Bromfield; Shannon Kalawan; Tiffany James	Jamaica	21 April 2014	2014 Fort-de-France	

=== Boys Under 17 ===
Event	Record	Athlete	Nationality	Date	Games	Ref.
100 m	10.34	Dexter Lee	Jamaica	7 April 2007	2007 Providenciales	
200 m	20.84 (+1.2 m/s)	Odean Skeen	Jamaica	5 April 2010	2010 Georgetown	
400 m	47.27	Nickecoy Bramwell	Jamaica	30 March 2024	2024 St. George's	
800 m	1:51.79	Jerrad Mason	Barbados	25 April 2011	2011 Montego Bay	
1500 m	4:00.04	Theon O'Connor	Jamaica	7 April 2007	2007 Providenciales	
3000 m	8:46.49	Kemoy Campbell	Jamaica	8 April 2007	2007 Providenciales	
5000 m	16:11.01	Kendell Simon	Grenada	4 April 1999	1999 Fort-de-France	
100 m hurdles	12.88	Aaron Wilmore	Bahamas	24 March 2008	2008 Basseterre	
110 m hurdles (91.4 cm)	13.54 (+0.6 m/s)	Deshaun Lamb	Jamaica	22 April 2019	2019 George Town	
400 m hurdles	52.19	Robert Miller	Jamaica	31 March 2024	2024 St. George's	
High jump	2.13 m	Raymond Higgs	Bahamas	7 April 2007	2007 Providenciales	
Long jump	7.83 m	Kareem Streete-Thompson	Cayman Islands	March 1989	1989 Bridgetown	
Triple jump	15.26 m (−0.7 m/s)	Amani Phillips	Jamaica	19 April 2025	2025 Port of Spain	
Shot put (5 kg)	18.90 m	Kamari Kennedy	Jamaica	20 March 2024	2025 Port of Spain	
Discus throw (1.5 kg)	60.87 m	Kamari Kennedy	Jamaica	21 April 2025	2025 Port of Spain	
Javelin throw (700 g)	68.84 m	Maliek Francis	Antigua and Barbuda	30 March 2024	2024 St. George's	
Octathlon	5158 pts	Omari Brown	Trinidad and Tobago	19–20 April 2025	2025 Port of Spain	
Octathlon	100m (wind) / Long jump (wind) / Shot put / 400m / 110m H (wind) / High jump / Javelin / 1000m; 11.02 (−1.2 m/s) / 6.82 m (±0.0 m/s) / 9.84 m / 49.74 / 14.03 (−0.8 m/s) / 1.75 m / 23.15 m / 5:16.52					
4 × 100 m relay	40.76	Adam Cummings; Odean Skeen; Travis Drummond; Jazeel Murphy	Jamaica	12 April 2009	2009 Vieux Fort	
4 × 400 m relay	3:12.72	Jonathan Higgs; Jahcario Wilson; Jireh Woodside; Eagan Neely	Bahamas	21 April 2025	2025 Port of Spain	

=== Girls Under 17 ===
Event	Record	Athlete	Nationality	Date	Games	Ref.
100 m	11.27 (+1.6 m/s)	Briana Williams	Jamaica	31 March 2018	2018 Nassau	
200 m	23.03 (heat)	Anneisha McLaughlin	Jamaica	31 March 2002	2002 Nassau	
400 m	52.47	Shameika McLean	Jamaica	4 April 2026	2026 St. George's	
800 m	2:09.59	Natoya Goule	Jamaica	17 April 2006	2006 Les Abymes	
1500 m	4:32.70	Natoya Goule	Jamaica	15 April 2006	2006 Les Abymes	
3000 m	10:00.23	Janill Williams	Antigua and Barbuda	4 April 1999	1999 Fort-de-France	
100 m hurdles (76.2 cm)	13.11 (+1.7 m/s)	Crystal Morrison	Jamaica	1 April 2018	2018 Nassau	
300 m hurdles	41.30	Janieve Russell	Jamaica	12 April 2009	2009 Vieux Fort	
400 m hurdles	1:00.78	Quaycian Davis	Jamaica	21 April 2019	2019 George Town	
High jump	1.85 m	Akela Jones	Barbados	3 April 2010	2010 Georgetown	
Long jump	6.14 m	Jackie Edwards	Bahamas	April 1987	1987 Port of Spain	
Triple jump	12.69 m (−3.7 m/s)	Jaeda Robinson	Jamaica	1 April 2024	2024 St. George's	
Shot put (3 kg)	14.51 m	Thamera Manette	Martinique	31 March 2018	2018 Nassau	
Shot put	14.29 m	Claudia Villeneuve	Martinique	3 April 1999	1999 Fort-de-France	
Discus throw (1.0 kg)	47.94 m	Cedricka Williams	Jamaica	22 April 2019	2019 George Town	
Javelin throw (500 g)	52.53 m	Dior-Rae Scott	Bahamas	1 April 2024	2024 St. George's	
Javelin throw 600g old spec. (-1998)	43.66 m	Francette Pognon	Martinique	April 1997	1997 Bridgetown	
Javelin throw 600g new spec. (1999-)	44.57 m	Dior-Rae Scott	Bahamas	18 April 2022	2022 Kingston	
4 × 100 m relay	44.21	Keyezra Thomas; Taree Forbes; Jazae Johnson; Brion Ward	Bahamas	5 April 2026	2026 St. George's	
4 × 400 m relay	3:38.09	Janieve Russell; Shericka Jackson; Deandre Whitehorne; Chrisann Gordon	Jamaica	13 April 2009	2009 Vieux Fort	

== Austin Sealy Award Winners ==
Starting in 1977, the Austin Sealy Award is presented to the athlete adjudged the most outstanding, either in terms of record accomplishment, or quality of performance as compared to other top medallists. The Carifta Games Magazine issued for the 40th edition of the Carifta Games contains the article: "Most Outstanding Athletes over the years: Winners of the Austin Sealy Trophy", by David Miller, published on page 19 in part 2 and on page 24 in part 3. It displays a complete list of award winners. However, there are a couple of inconsistencies: in 2008 Barbados' hurdles sprinter Kierre Beckles won the trophy rather than Trinidadian hurdles sprinter Jehue Gordon, who on the other hand gained the trophy in 2010 rather than Grenadian sprinter Kirani James, the winner of 2009.

In 2002 Jamaican U17 sprinter Anneisha McLaughlin won the award rather Usain Bolt, who was awarded the trophy in 2003 and 2004.

Bahamian thrower Laverne Eve is reported to be the award winner in Kingston in 1982 and Martinique in 1983, rather than in 1981. In the year 1981, U17 sprinter Candy Ford from Bermuda, who then won three gold medals (100 m, 200 m, and 400 m), was awarded the so-called "Oscar Steele Challenge Trophy" for being the most outstanding athlete of the games.

Winner (Country)	Year(s)
Debbie Jones (BER)	1977
Mary Ann Higgs (BAH)	1978*
Thaon Jon Jones (JAM)	1979*
Richard Louis (BAR)	1980*
Candy Ford (BER)	1981*†
Laverne Eve (BAH)	1982
Laverne Eve (BAH)	1983
Pauline Davis (BAH)	1984
Andrea Thomas (JAM)	1985
(Guadeloupe) Pascal Théophile (GLP)	1986*
Nicole Springer (BAR)	1987
Michelle Freeman (JAM)	1988
Kareem Streete-Thompson (CAY)	1989*
Kareem Streete-Thompson (CAY)	1990
Inez Turner (JAM)	1991
Claudine Williams (JAM)	1992*
Nikole Mitchell (JAM)	1993
Obadele Thompson (BAR)	1994
Debbie Ferguson (BAH)	1995
Cydonie Mothersille (CAY)	1996
Roy Bailey (JAM); Aleen Bailey (JAM)	1997
Janill Williams (ATG)	1998
Darrel Brown (TRI)	1999*
Darrel Brown (TRI)	2000*
Veronica Campbell (JAM)	2001
Anneisha McLaughlin (JAM)	2002*
Usain Bolt (JAM)	2003
Usain Bolt (JAM)	2004
Theon O'Conner (JAM)	2005*
Gavyn Nero (TRI)	2006*
Yohan Blake (JAM)	2007
Kierre Beckles (BAR)	2008
Kirani James (GRN)	2009
Jehue Gordon (TRI)	2010
Anthonique Strachan (BAH)	2011
Anthonique Strachan (BAH)	2012
Shaunae Miller (BAH)	2013
Akela Jones (BAR)	2014
Mary Fraser (BAR)	2015*
Anderson Peters (GRN)	2016
Glenn Kunst (CUR)	2017
Briana Williams (JAM)	2018
Briana Williams (JAM)	2019
Competition not held	2020
Competition not held	2021
Adeajah Hodge (BVI)	2022
Roshawn Clarke (JAM)	2023
Janae De Gannes (TRI)	2024
Kamari Kennedy (JAM)	2025
Shanoya Douglas (JAM)	2026

* = Under-17 (before 2014) / Under-18 (after 2013)
† = Oscar Steele Challenge Trophy

== See also ==
- Caribbean Community
