= 2022 World Athletics U20 Championships – Men's hammer throw =

Men's hammer throw at the 2022 World Athletics U20 Championships
- Venue: Estadio Olímpico Pascual Guerrero
- Dates: 2 August (qualification); 4 August (final)
- Competitors: 23 from 18 nations
- Winning distance: 79.11 m

Medalists
gold medal	Ioannis Korakidis	Greece
silver medal	Max Lampinen	Finland
bronze medal	Iosif Kesidis	Cyprus

The men's hammer throw at the 2022 World Athletics U20 Championships was held at Estadio Olímpico Pascual Guerrero on 2 and 4, August 2022.

== Records ==
Standing records prior to the 2022 World Athletics U20 Championships
World U20 Record	Ashraf Amgad El-Seify (QAT)	85.57	Barcelona, Spain	14 July 2012
Championship Record	Ashraf Amgad El-Seify (QAT)	85.57	Barcelona, Spain	14 July 2012
World U20 Leading	Miklós Csekő (HUN)	78.44	Maribor, Slovenia	16 July 2022

== Results ==
=== Qualification ===
The qualification round took place on 2 August, in two groups, with Group A starting at 12:10 and Group B starting at 13:25. Athletes attaining a mark of at least 73.50 metres ( Q ) or at least the 12 best performers ( q ) qualified for the final.

Rank	Group	Name	Nationality	Round			Mark	Notes
Rank	Group	Name	Nationality	1	2	3	Mark	Notes
1	A	Max Lampinen	Finland	75.32			75.32	Q, PB
2	B	Ioannis Korakidis	Greece	69.39	75.07		75.07	Q
3	A	Iosif Kesidis	Cyprus	74.99			60.73	Q, PB
4	A	Jan Emberšič	Slovenia	72.96	74.89		74.89	Q
5	B	Ayubkhon Fayozov	Uzbekistan	74.62			74.62	Q, PB
6	B	Miklós Csekő	Hungary	72.12	74.07		74.07	Q
7	B	Tarik Robinson-O'Hagan	United States	73.51			73.51	Q
8	B	Jakob Urbanč	Slovenia	72.11	73.37	x	73.37	q, PB
9	A	Nikolaos Polychroniou	Greece	73.16	x	71.77	73.16	q
10	B	José Eduardo Chávez	Mexico	x	73.06	73.07	73.07	q, PB
11	A	Davide Vattolo	Italy	69.91	72.02	70.88	72.02	q
12	B	Emre Çiftçi	Turkey	66.48	69.62	71.35	71.35	q
13	B	Leo Bystedt	Sweden	x	69.43	70.93	70.93	PB
14	A	Collin Burkhart	United States	68.39	70.84	x	70.84	
15	B	Owen Merrett	Great Britain	67.24	70.50	66.94	70.50	PB
16	A	Jean Carlos Ortíz	Colombia	68.73	70.13	66.55	70.13	
17	B	Kai Hurych	Germany	69.36	x	69.86	69.86	
18	A	Lars Wolfisberg	Switzerland	69.81	x	64.38	69.81	NU20R
19	A	Jovan Stranić	Serbia	x	x	69.80	69.80	
20	B	Mubeen Al-Kindi	Oman	67.46	x	65.76	67.46	
21	B	Alessandro Feruglio	Italy	67.45	64.84	64.96	67.45	
22	A	Dániel Füredi	Hungary	x	x	66.04	66.04	
23	A	Wiltrid Huet	France	x	x	64.22	64.22	

=== Final ===
The final was held on 4 August at 16:48.

Rank	Name	Nationality	Round						Mark	Notes
Rank	Name	Nationality	1	2	3	4	5	6	Mark	Notes
1st place, gold medalist(s)	Ioannis Korakidis	Greece	73.84	x	69.80	75.59	79.11	x	79.11	WU20L
2nd place, silver medalist(s)	Max Lampinen	Finland	74.46	73.19	75.75	73.57	76.33	72.58	76.33	PB
3rd place, bronze medalist(s)	Iosif Kesidis	Cyprus	74.11	74.98	75.89	75.55	75.87	76.32	76.32	PB
4	Nikolaos Polychroniou	Greece	74.20	74.79	76.12	x	x	76.05	76.12	
5	Jan Emberšič	Slovenia	74.59	73.66	74.83	74.68	x	74.45	74.83	
6	Ayubkhon Fayozov	Uzbekistan	x	73.77	x	x	73.50	x	73.77	
7	Emre Çiftçi	Turkey	69.10	73.13	x	72.19	71.03	x	73.13	
8	Tarik Robinson-O'Hagan	United States	72.18	x	73.05	69.16	x	x	73.05	
9	Davide Vattolo	Italy	72.54	71.79	72.08				72.54	
10	José Eduardo Chávez	Mexico	71.61	69.44	x				71.61	
11	Miklós Csekő	Hungary	71.10	69.41	69.72				71.10	
12	Jakob Urbanč	Slovenia	68.15	69.99	x				69.99	
