= 2022 World Athletics U20 Championships – Women's high jump =

Women's high jump at the 2022 World Athletics U20 Championships
- Venue: Estadio Olímpico Pascual Guerrero
- Dates: 4 August (qualification); 6 August (final)
- Competitors: 19 from 13 nations
- Winning height: 1.95

Medalists
gold medal	Karmen Bruus	Estonia
silver medal	Britt Weerman	Netherlands
bronze medal	Angelina Topić	Serbia

The women's high jump at the 2022 World Athletics U20 Championships was held at the Estadio Olímpico Pascual Guerrero on 4 and 6 August.

20 athletes from 13 countries were entered to the competition. Since only two athletes per nation can compete in each event, the third entered athlete from Estonia, Liisa-Maria Lusti did not compete in high jump, but heptathlon instead, reduced the number of athletes to 19.

== Records ==
U20 standing records prior to the 2022 World Athletics U20 Championships were as follows:

Record	Athlete & Nationality	Mark	Location	Date
World U20 Record	Yaroslava Mahuchikh (UKR)	2.01	Doha, Qatar	30 September 2019
Championship Record	Alina Astafei (ROM)	2.00	Sudbury, Canada	29 July 1988
World U20 Leading	Angelina Topić (SRB)	1.96	Kruševac, Serbia	26 June 2022
World U20 Leading	Karmen Bruus (EST)	1.96	Eugene, USA	19 July 2022

== Results ==
=== Qualification ===
The qualification round took place on 4 August, in two groups, both starting at 16:12. Athletes attaining a mark of at least 1.85 metres ( Q ) or at least the 12 best performers ( q ) qualified for the final.

Rank	Group	Name	Nationality	1.67	1.72	1.76	1.80	Mark	Notes
1	B	Angelina Topić	Serbia	–	o	o	o	1.80	q
1	B	Britt Weerman	Netherlands	–	–	o	o	1.80	q
1	B	Elisabeth Pihela	Estonia	–	–	o	o	1.80	q
1	A	Erin Shaw	Australia	–	o	o	o	1.80	q
1	A	Karmen Bruus	Estonia	–	–	o	o	1.80	q
1	A	Mariia Alieinikova	Ukraine	–	o	o	o	1.80	q
1	A	Zorana Rokavec	Serbia	o	o	o	o	1.80	q
8	B	Merel Maes	Belgium	–	o	o	xo	1.80	q
8	B	Toby Stolberg	Australia	o	o	o	xo	1.80	q, SB
8	A	Nina Borger	Netherlands	o	o	o	xo	1.80	q
11	B	Celia Rifaterra	Spain	o	xo	o	xxo	1.80	q
11	A	Emma Gates	United States	o	xo	o	xxo	1.80	q
13	B	Veronika Kramarenko	Ukraine	–	o	o	xxx	1.76	
14	A	Yorunn Ligneel	Belgium	o	xo	o	xxx	1.76	
15	B	Anna-Sophie Schmitt	Germany	o	o	xo	xxx	1.76	
15	A	Federica Gabriela Apostol	Romania	o	o	xo	xxx	1.76	
17	B	Arielly Kailayne Monteiro	Brazil	o	o	xxo	xxx	1.76	
18	A	Lāsma Zemīte	Latvia	o	o	xxx		1.72	
18	B	Styliana Ioannidou	Cyprus	o	o	xxx		1.72	

=== Final ===
The final started at 15:35 on 6 August.

Rank	Name	Nationality	Round									Mark	Notes
Rank	Name	Nationality	1.70	1.75	1.80	1.85	1.88	1.91	1.93	1.95	1.97	Mark	Notes
1st place, gold medalist(s)	Karmen Bruus	Estonia	-	o	o	xo	o	o	xo	xxo	xxx	1.95	
2nd place, silver medalist(s)	Britt Weerman	Netherlands	-	o	xo	o	o	o	o	xxx		1.93	NU20R
3rd place, bronze medalist(s)	Angelina Topić	Serbia	-	o	o	o	o	o	xo	xxx		1.93	
4	Erin Shaw	Australia	-	o	o	o	xo	xxx				1.88	PB
5	Merel Maes	Belgium	o	o	xo	xo	xo	xxx				1.88	SB
6	Elisabeth Pihela	Estonia	-	xxo	o	xxx						1.80	
7	Celia Rifaterra	Spain	o	xxo	xo	xxx						1.80	
8	Mariia Alieinikova	Ukraine	o	o	xxx							1.75	
9	Toby Stolberg	Australia	o	o	xxx							1.75	
10	Zorana Rokavec	Serbia	o	xxo	xxx							1.75	
11	Emma Gates	United States	o	xxo	xxx							1.75	
12	Nina Borger	Netherlands	o	xxx								1.70	
