= Britt Weerman =

Dutch high jumper

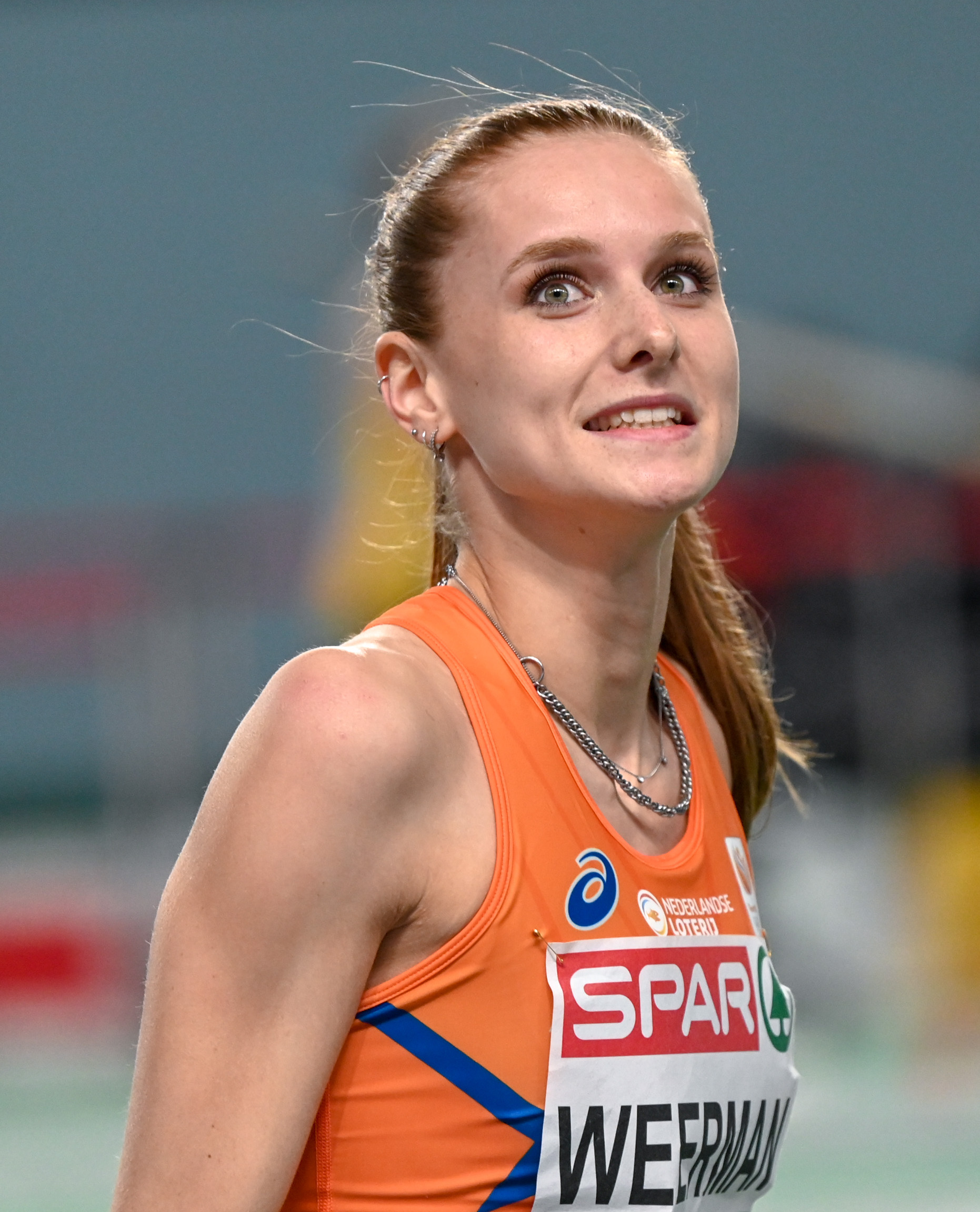
- Weerman at the 2023 European Indoor Championships in Istanbul

Personal information
- Born: 13 June 2003 (age 23) Assen, Netherlands
- Height: 1.74 m (5 ft 9 in)

Sport
- Country: Netherlands
- Sport: Athletics
- Event: High jump
- Club: Groningen Athletics

Achievements and titles
- Personal bests: 1.95 m (6 ft 4 3/4 in) NR (2022); Indoors; 1.96 m (6 ft 5 in) NR (2023)
Medal record
Women's athletics
Representing Netherlands
European Indoor Championships
Silver medal – second place	2023 Istanbul	High jump
World U20 Championships
Silver medal – second place	2022 Cali	High jump
European U20 Championships
Gold medal – first place	2021 Tallinn	High jump

Britt Weerman (Dutch: [brɪt ˈʋeːrmɑn]; born 13 June 2003) is a Dutch track and field athlete who competes in the high jump.

She won the silver medal at the 2023 European Indoor Championships. Weerman was the 2021 European Under-20 champion and finished second at the World U20 Championships a year later. She is the Dutch record holder for the high jump both outdoors and indoors, and has won eight national titles.

== Early life and background ==
Britt Weerman was born on 13 June 2003 in Assen, Netherlands. Initially, she trained in gymnastics from the age of six to thirteen when cartilage damage in her elbow joint forced her to stop. As of 2022, she studied commercial economics at the Johan Cruyff Academy.

== Youth and junior career ==
In 2020, at age 16/17, Weerman won Dutch under-18 titles in the high jump both indoors and outdoors and also claimed her first national senior titles, both indoors and outdoors.

The following year, she earned the gold medal at the European U20 Championships held in Tallinn, Estonia with a jump of 1.88 m.

In July 2022, the 19-year-old set a Dutch national record of 1.95 m at a meeting in Ninove, Belgium, improving her personal best by 7 cm and beating Nadine Broersen's previous record by 1 cm. In August, she won silver at the World U20 Championships staged in Cali, Colombia, clearing 1.93 m to finish second behind Karmen Bruus and ahead of Angelina Topić. The same month, she placed fourth with the same height at the Munich 2022 European Championships, this time behind Topić who also jumped 1.93 m, securing the bronze medal on countback.

== Senior career ==
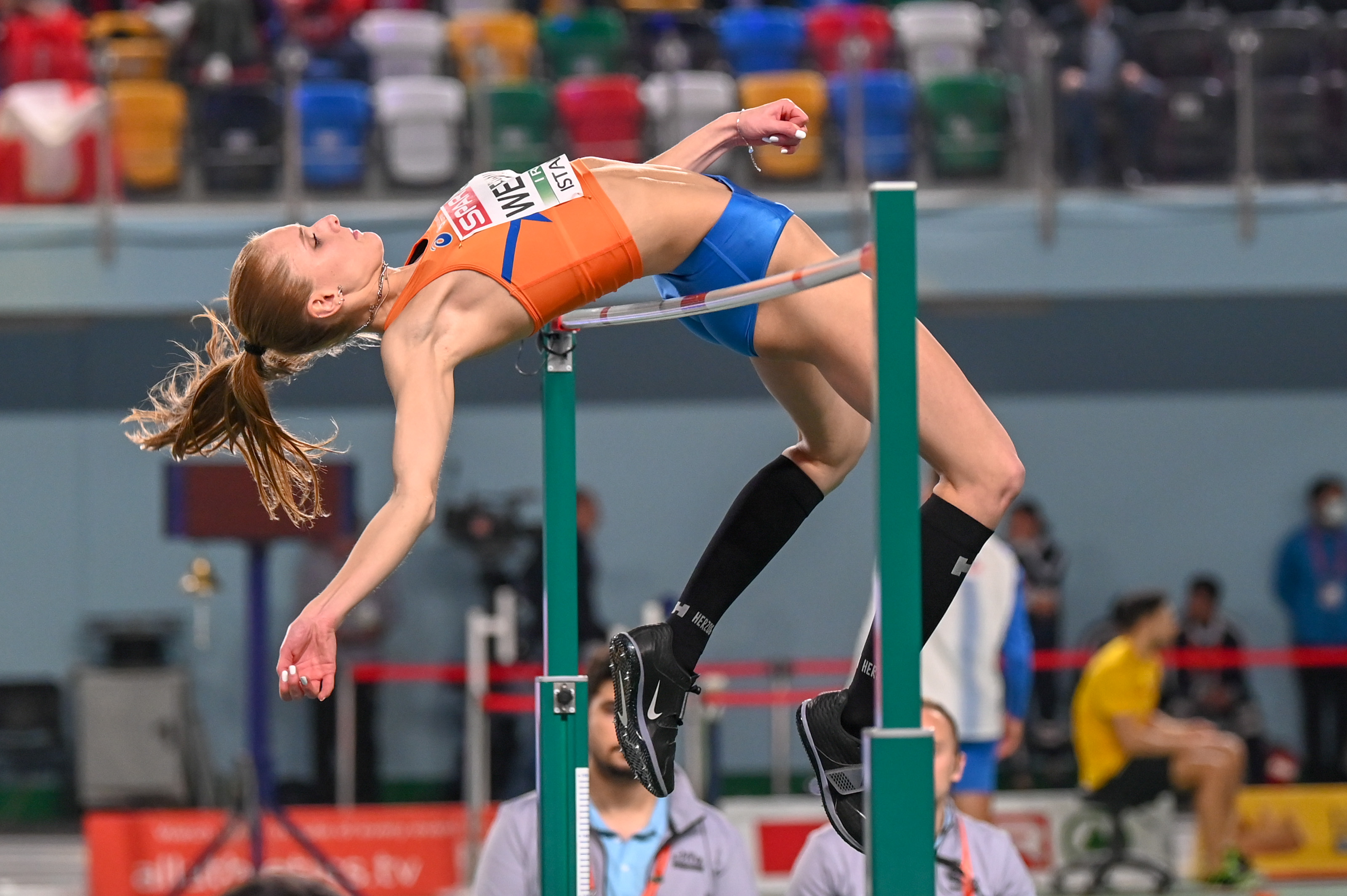
Weerman at the 2023 European Indoor Championships in Istanbul

On 3 February 2023, Weerman broke by 3 cm Broersen's Dutch indoor record with a clearance of 1.96 m in Weinheim, Germany, her outright best. She equalled this achievement at the European Indoor Championships held in March in Istanbul to take the silver medal behind Yaroslava Mahuchikh. It was the first medal for a Dutch high jumper in almost 50 years, after Annemieke Bouma's bronze in 1975.

== Personal bests ==
- High jump – 1.95 m (6 ft 4 3/4 in) (Ninove 2022) NU20R NR
  - High jump indoor – 1.96 m (6 ft 5 in) (Weinheim 2023) NR
  - High jump indoor U20 – 1.92 m (6 ft 3 1/2 in) (Weinheim 2022) NU20R

== Competition results ==
All information from World Athletics profile.

=== International competitions ===
Representing the Netherlands
Year	Competition	Venue	Position	Event	Result	Notes
2021	European U20 Championships	Tallinn, Estonia	1st	High jump	1.88 m	=NU23R
2022	World U20 Championships	Cali, Colombia	2nd	High jump	1.93 m	NU20R
2022	European Championships	Munich, Germany	4th	High jump	1.93 m	
2023	European Indoor Championships	Istanbul, Turkey	2nd	High jump	1.96 m	=NR
2025	European Indoor Championships	Apeldoorn, Netherlands	11th (q)	High jump	1.85 m	
2025	European U23 Championships	Bergen, Norway	–	High jump	NM	
2025	World Championships	Tokyo, Japan	–	High jump	NM	

=== National titles ===
- Dutch Athletics Championships
  - High jump: 2020, 2022, 2024
- Dutch Indoor Athletics Championships
  - High jump indoor: 2020, 2021, 2022, 2023, 2025
