= 2025 European Athletics U23 Championships – Men's hammer throw =

Men's hammer throw at the 2025 European Athletics U23 Championships
- Venue: Fana Stadion
- Location: Bergen, Norway
- Dates: 19 July (qualification); 20 July (final)
- Competitors: 23 from 14 nations
- Winning distance: 74.87 m NU23R

Medalists
gold medal	Iosif Kesidis	Cyprus
silver medal	Georgios Papanastasiou	Greece
bronze medal	Ioannis Korakidis	Greece

The men's hammer throw event at the 2025 European Athletics U23 Championships was held in Bergen, Norway, at Fana Stadion on 19 and 20 July.

== Records ==
Prior to the competition, the records were as follows:

Record	Athlete (nation)	Distance (m)	Location	Date
European U23 record	Olli-Pekka Karjalainen (FIN)	81.70 m	Lahti, Finland	16 June 2002
Championship U23 record	Nicolas Figère (FRA)	80.88 m	Amsterdam, Netherlands	15 July 2001

== Results ==
=== Qualification ===
All athletes over 71.50 m (Q) or at least the 12 best performers (q) advance to the final.

==== Group A ====
Place	Athlete	Nation	#1	#2	#3	Result	Notes
1	Angelos Mantzouranis	Greece	x	73.38		73.38 m	Q
2	Lars Wolfisberg	Switzerland	65.75	65.47	70.45	70.45 m	q
3	Jakob Urbanč	Slovenia	67.96	68.24	69.55	69.55 m	q
4	Georgios Papanastasiou	Greece	66.01	69.01	68.16	69.01 m	q
5	Arttu Härkönen	Finland	65.95	x	68.96	68.96 m	q
6	Emre ÇiftçI	Turkey	65.47	x	68.63	68.63 m	q
7	Filippo Maria Iacocca	Italy	60.72	65.05	67.70	67.70 m	PB
8	Kai Hurych	Germany	66.06	66.20	64.33	66.20 m	
9	Roland Imre	Hungary	64.61	x	65.57	65.57 m	
10	Albin Silén	Sweden	x	63.54	63.54	63.54 m	
11	Alar Reiljan	Estonia	61.62	x	61.81	61.81 m	

==== Group B ====
Place	Athlete	Nation	#1	#2	#3	Result	Notes
1	Iosif Kesidis	Cyprus	x	66.98	71.90	71.90 m	Q
2	Max Lampinen	Finland	68.56	71.13	70.75	71.13 m	q, SB
3	Ioannis Korakidis	Greece	71.10	x	-	71.10 m	q
4	Miklós Csekő	Hungary	67.88	x	70.85	70.85 m	q
5	Jan EmberšIč	Slovenia	68.04	68.94	69.05	69.05 m	q
6	Devlin Neyens	Belgium	x	67.92	62.04	67.92 m	q
7	Tim Steinfurth	Germany	65.91	65.11	67.72	67.72 m	
8	Jovan Stranić	Serbia	x	67.30	67.59	67.59 m	NU23R
9	Szymon Groenwald	Poland	64.14	67.41	x	67.41 m	PB
10	Dániel Füredi	Hungary	62.42	x	64.66	64.66 m	
11	Leo Bystedt	Sweden	61.12	63.45	61.59	63.45 m	
12	Adam Hellbom	Sweden	58.83	61.75	62.76	62.76 m	

=== Final ===
Place	Athlete	Nation	#1	#2	#3	#4	#5	#6	Result	Notes
1st place, gold medalist(s)	Iosif Kesidis	Cyprus	x	73.03	x	73.67	74.87	x	74.87 m	NU23R
2nd place, silver medalist(s)	Georgios Papanastasiou	Greece	72.98	x	71.24	72.51	72.86	x	72.98 m	
3rd place, bronze medalist(s)	Ioannis Korakidis	Greece	70.64	69.14	x	72.51	71.93	67.88	72.51 m	
4	Jan EmberšIč	Slovenia	69.14	68.15	70.42	71.72	x	70.45	71.72 m	PB
5	Max Lampinen	Finland	70.71	x	70.39	70.05	x	x	70.71 m	
6	Lars Wolfisberg	Switzerland	69.09	70.50	68.05	69.86	66.21	69.42	70.50 m	
7	Jakob Urbanč	Slovenia	67.00	68.07	68.97	68.71	69.30	69.45	69.45 m	
8	Emre ÇiftçI	Turkey	x	62.85	68.41	67.86	x	x	68.41 m	
9	Arttu Härkönen	Finland	67.59	x	66.34				67.59 m	
10	Miklós Csekő	Hungary	61.94	66.20	x				66.20 m	
11	Devlin Neyens	Belgium	63.64	x	65.77				65.77 m	
—	Angelos Mantzouranis	Greece	x	x	x				NM	
