= 2022 World Athletics U20 Championships – Women's discus throw =

Women's discus throw at the 2022 World Athletics U20 Championships
- Venue: Estadio Olímpico Pascual Guerrero
- Dates: 1 August (qualification); 3 August (final)
- Competitors: 29 from 21 nations
- Winning distance: 56.15 m

Medalists
gold medal	Emma Sralla	Sweden
silver medal	Despoina Areti Filippidou	Greece
bronze medal	Miné de Klerk	South Africa

The women's discus throw at the 2022 World Athletics U20 Championships was held at Estadio Olímpico Pascual Guerrero on 1 and 3 August.

== Records ==
Standing records prior to the 2022 World Athletics U20 Championships
World U20 Record	Ilke Wyludda (GDR)	74.40	East Berlin, East Germany	13 September 1988
Championship Record	Ilke Wyludda (GDR)	68.24	Sudbury, Canada	31 July 1988
World U20 Leading	Emma Sralla (SWE)	56.38	McKinney, United States	21 April 2022

== Results ==
=== Qualification ===
The qualification round took place on 1 August, in two groups, with Group A starting at 15:00 and Group B starting at 16:27. Athletes attaining a mark of at least 52.50 metres ( Q ) or at least the 12 best performers ( q ) qualified for the final.

Rank	Group	Name	Nationality	Round			Mark	Notes
Rank	Group	Name	Nationality	1	2	3	Mark	Notes
1	A	Emma Sralla	Sweden	x	54.51		54.51	Q
2	B	Despoina Areti Filippidou	Greece	52.48	50.86	x	52.48	q, SB
3	A	Zara Obamakinwa	Great Britain	51.99	x	44.89	51.99	q, PB
4	B	Tapenisa Havea	New Zealand	40.60	49.36	51.57	51.57	q
5	A	Marley Raikiwasa	Australia	49.81	50.51	49.08	50.51	q
6	B	Siniru Iheoma	United States	47.87	48.72	50.41	50.41	q
7	B	Benedetta Benedetti	Italy	x	x	50.22	50.22	q
8	A	Miné de Klerk	South Africa	50.12	x	49.55	50.12	q
9	A	Katja Seng	Germany	x	49.99	48.88	49.99	q
10	A	Marie-Josée Bovele-Linaka	France	x	48.82	48.70	48.82	q
11	A	Danara Dewi Stoppels	Netherlands	48.76	47.52	44.85	48.76	q
12	B	Lucija Leko	Croatia	48.01	x	x	48.01	q
13	B	Paulina Stuglytė	Lithuania	47.99	x	x	47.99	
14	A	Milica Poznanović	Serbia	46.70	47.43	x	47.43	
15	B	Vilma Räsänen	Finland	46.35	x	47.08	47.08	
16	A	Ames Burton	United States	x	x	46.64	46.64	
17	B	Lesedi Khunou	South Africa	42.77	x	46.29	46.29	
18	B	Cedricka Williams	Jamaica	46.20	x	27.13	46.20	
19	B	Lalenii Grant	Trinidad and Tobago	x	46.09	43.58	46.09	
20	B	Princesse Hyman	France	46.03	x	x	46.03	
21	A	Martyna Dobrowolska	Poland	46.01	x	x	46.01	
22	A	Natalia Rankin-Chitar	New Zealand	40.48	45.85	42.74	45.85	
23	B	Laylani Va'ai	Australia	42.00	43.79	40.85	43.79	
24	A	Jule Insinna	Liechtenstein	46.01	x	x	46.01	
25	B	Lea Bork	Germany	35.42	43.60	41.79	43.60	
26	B	Ebba Lind	Sweden	42.39	40.79	42.29	42.39	
27	A	Nicole Valencia	Colombia	41.02	x	x	41.02	
28	A	Abigail Martin	Jamaica	x	x	38.89	38.89	
29	A	Vineta Krūmiņa	Latvia	x	38.25	x	38.25	

=== Final ===
The final was held on 3 August at 18:12.

Rank	Name	Nationality	Round						Mark	Notes
Rank	Name	Nationality	1	2	3	4	5	6	Mark	Notes
1st place, gold medalist(s)	Emma Sralla	Sweden	x	54.94	52.78	56.15	53.47	x	56.15	
2nd place, silver medalist(s)	Despoina Areti Filippidou	Greece	x	51.69	54.48	50.97	54.35	x	54.48	SB
3rd place, bronze medalist(s)	Miné de Klerk	South Africa	48.98	49.73	51.75	51.55	53.54	49.21	53.54	NU20R
4	Siniru Iheoma	United States	53.15	x	x	46.96	x	x	53.15	
5	Danara Dewi Stoppels	Netherlands	x	49.24	x	51.74	46.97	51.86	51.86	PB
6	Marie-Josée Bovele-Linaka	France	51.07	x	x	51.63	46.60	50.37	51.63	PB
7	Tapenisa Havea	New Zealand	45.69	49.45	48.79	49.28	50.39	50.97	50.97	
8	Katja Seng	Germany	x	49.70	48.43	49.37	x	x	49.70	
9	Marley Raikiwasa	Australia	48.41	48.27	48.74				48.74	
10	Lucija Leko	Croatia	x	47.68	x				47.68	
11	Zara Obamakinwa	Great Britain	x	37.09	47.23				47.23	
12	Benedetta Benedetti	Italy	47.01	46.11	46.63				47.01	
