= Max Lampinen =

Finnish athlete (born 2004)

Personal information
- Born: 11 October 2004 (age 21)

Sport
- Sport: Athletics
- Events: Hammer throw, Discus throw

Achievements and titles
- Personal bests: Hammer: 72.48m (Stockholm, 2025); Discus: 48.86m (Kotka, 2024)
Medal record
Men's athletics
Representing Finland
World U20 Championships
Silver medal – second place	2022 Cali	Hammer throw
European U20 Championships
Gold medal – first place	2023 Jerusalem	Hammer throw

Max Lampinen (born 11 October 2004) is a Finnish hammer thrower. He was a gold medalist at the 2023 European Athletics U20 Championships and a silver medalist at the 2022 World Athletics U20 Championships.

== Biography ==
Lampinen was a silver medalist at the 2022 World Athletics U20 Championships in Cali, Colombia, throwing a 76.33m personal best in the fifth round to finish a centimetre ahead of Cypriot Iosif Kesidis but behind Ioannis Korakidis of Greece. The following year, he won the 2023 European Athletics U20 Championships in Jerusalem.

In 2025, Lampinen placed fifth at the 2025 European Athletics U23 Championships in Bergen, Norway. The following month, he placed third at the senior Finnish Athletics Championships. He also placed third competing for Finland at the Finnkampen in Stockholm in August 2025, throwing a personal best 72.48 metres.

Competing in the United States, Lampinen had a sixth-place finish in the hammer throw at the 2026 Big Ten Championships. In June, he qualified for the 2026 NCAA Outdoor Championships.

== Personal life ==
From Sälinkää, his brother Mico Lampinen also competes as a hammer thrower.
