= 2024 World Athletics U20 Championships – Men's hammer throw =

Men's hammer throw at the 2024 World Athletics U20 Championships
- Venue: Estadio Atlético de la VIDENA
- Dates: 27 August 2024 (qualification); 29 August 2024 (final)
- Competitors: 31 from 22 nations
- Winning distance: 82.80 m

Medalists
gold medal	Iosif Kesidis	Cyprus
silver medal	Roland Imre	Hungary
bronze medal	Ármin Szabados	Hungary

The men's hammer throw at the 2024 World Athletics U20 Championships was held at the Estadio Atlético de la VIDENA in Lima, Peru on 27 and 29 August 2024.

== Records ==
U20 standing records prior to the 2024 World Athletics U20 Championships were as follows:

Record	Athlete & Nationality	Mark	Location	Date
World U20 Record	Ashraf Amgad El-Seify (QAT)	85.57	Barcelona, Spain	14 July 2012
Championship Record	Ashraf Amgad El-Seify (QAT)	85.57	Barcelona, Spain	14 July 2012
World U20 Leading	Iosif Kesidis (CYP)	81.07	Trikala, Greece	27 July 2024

== Results ==
=== Qualification ===
The qualification round took place on 27 August, in two groups, with Group A scheduled to start at 09:00 and Group B at 10:20. Athletes attaining a mark of at least 73.00 metres (Q) or at least the 12 best performers (q) qualified for the final.

==== Group A ====
Rank	Athlete	Nation	Round			Mark	Notes
Rank	Athlete	Nation	1	2	3	Mark	Notes
1	Iosif Kesidis	Cyprus	78.53			78.53	Q
2	Roland Imre	Hungary	75.26			75.26	Q, PB
3	Aatu Kangasniemi	Finland	66.92	68.10	70.96	70.96	q
4	Jáchym Sádovský	Czech Republic	68.18	68.25	69.25	69.25	q
5	Andraž Rajher	Slovenia	x	69.19	69.09	69.19	q
6	Artem Cherkashyn	Ukraine	63.76	69.00	65.43	69.00	q
7	Manfred Männamaa	Estonia	x	x	68.35	68.35	
8	Preslav Vâlev	Bulgaria	67.86	x	67.51	67.86	
9	Szymon Groenwald	Poland	63.72	x	67.33	67.33	
10	Juan Sebastián Scarpetta	Colombia	x	65.57	67.16	67.16	
11	Pavlos Tzamtzis	Greece	x	65.32	x	65.32	
12	Charl Greyling	South Africa	64.24	x	65.13	65.13	
13	Prateek	India	62.40	62.69	x	62.69	
14	Parker Kim	United States	x	62.39	62.23	62.39	
15	Benjamín Muñoz	Chile	x	x	61.02	61.02	

==== Group B ====
Rank	Athlete	Nation	Round			Mark	Notes
Rank	Athlete	Nation	1	2	3	Mark	Notes
1	Ármin Szabados	Hungary	74.20			74.20	Q
2	Ryan Johnson	United States	71.08	72.88	70.21	72.88	q, PB
3	Xu Zheng	China	70.09	70.44	71.09	71.19	q
4	Talal Alrushoud	Kuwait	70.15	70.49	69.52	70.49	q
5	Patrik Danilevič	Czech Republic	69.19	68.89	70.17	70.17	q, PB
6	Pietro Camilli	Italy	68.28	69.03	68.81	69.03	q
7	Mico Lampinen	Finland	x	69.00	x	69.00	
8	Francisco Calhau	Portugal	68.68	x	65.16	68.68	PB
9	Dimo Andreev	Bulgaria	66.00	64.25	67.74	67.74	
10	Jake McEachern	Canada	65.15	67.68	x	67.68	
11	Anton Strömber	Sweden	66.52	65.82	67.08	67.08	
12	Jakub Pracharczyk	Poland	65.74	x	x	65.74	
13	Cipriano Riquelme	Chile	62.53	64.67	65.11	65.11	
14	Timo Port	Germany	x	x	65.09	65.09	
–	Kyriakos Kaittanis	Cyprus	x	x	x	NM	
–	Georgios Papanastasiou	Greece	x	x	x	NM	

=== Final ===
Rank	Athlete	Nation	Round						Mark	Notes
Rank	Athlete	Nation	1	2	3	4	5	6	Mark	Notes
1st place, gold medalist(s)	Iosif Kesidis	Cyprus	79.47	76.91	80.95	81.53	78.71	82.80	82.80	WU20L
2nd place, silver medalist(s)	Roland Imre	Hungary	x	68.18	66.79	71.58	70.53	75.33	75.33	PB
3rd place, bronze medalist(s)	Ármin Szabados	Hungary	70.40	72.58	x	x	73.65	74.88	74.88	
4	Ryan Johnson	United States	71.64	72.13	x	x	66.68	x	72.13	
5	Jáchym Sádovský	Czech Republic	68.76	67.55	70.01	71.14	71.81	68.79	71.81	
6	Xu Zheng	China	x	70.06	71.00	68.29	69.16	71.81	71.81	
7	Aatu Kangasniemi	Finland	71.04	69.17	70.49	71.70	71.09	x	71.70	
8	Andraž Rajher	Slovenia	66.07	67.98	x	67.67	68.73	x	68.73	
9	Talal Alrushoud	Kuwait	x	67.65	62.81				67.65	
10	Artem Cherkashyn	Ukraine	67.53	x	66.48				67.53	
11	Pietro Camilli	Italy	67.46	65.68	x				67.46	
12	Patrik Danilevič	Czech Republic	66.83	63.81	64.77				66.83	
