= Emma Sralla =

Swedish-American athlete (born 2004)

Personal information
- Nationality: Sweden
- Born: 26 September 2004 (age 21) Texas, USA

Sport
- Sport: Track and Field
- Event: Discus
Medal record
Women's athletics
Representing Sweden
World U20 Championships
Gold medal – first place	2022 Cali	Discus

Emma Sralla (born 26 September 2004) is a Swedish-American track and field athlete who won the discus at the 2022 World Athletics Junior Championships.

== Early and personal life ==
Sralla attended Edward S. Marcus High School in Flower Mound, Texas. With a Swedish mother and an American father, she has dual Swedish-American nationality. Her mother Anna moved to America aged 18 to play college golf and met Emma’s father Scott. Emma was born and raised in Texas but would visit family in Sweden every year. When in Sweden she competed for Spårvägen. She joined Stanford University on a sporting scholarship in 2023.

== Career ==
She competed at the 2021 European Athletics U20 Championships in Tallinn, Estonia, where she finished in eleventh place.

She set a world U20 best of 56.38 metres in Texas in April 2022. Representing Sweden, Sralla won the discus competition at the 2022 World Athletics U20 Championships in Cali, Colombia at the age of 17 years-old. With a winning throw of 56.15m, she finished nearly 2 metres ahead of her nearest rival, Greece’s Déspina-Aretí Filippídou, who threw 54.48 metres.

She threw a personal best for the discus of 59.70m in Ramona, Oklahoma in 2023. She went undefeated during her 2023 season and was named Texas Girls Gatorade Player of the Year. She competed at the 2023 BAUHAUS-galan, part of the 2023 Diamond League, in July 2023, placing ninth overall. She competed at the 2023 European Athletics U20 Championships in Jerusalem, Israel, in August 2023, but did not record a mark and did not proceed to the final.
