= Kobe Lawrence =

Jamaican shot putter

Personal information
- Born: 12 February 2004 (age 22)

Sport
- Sport: Athletics
- Event: Shot put

Achievements and titles
- Personal best: Shot put: 20.50 m (2026)
Medal record
Men's athletics
Representing JAM
World U20 Championships
Silver medal – second place	2022 Cali	Shot put

Kobe Lawrence (born 12 February 2004) is a Jamaican shot putter. He set a Jamaican indoor national record of 20.50 metres in placing second at the 2026 NCAA Indoor Championships. He was previously a silver medalists at the 2022 World Athletics U20 Championships.

== Biography ==
Lawrence attended Calabar High School in Jamaica. He placed eighth in the shot put at the 2021 World Athletics U20 Championships in Nairobi, Kenya. The following year, Lawrence won the silver medal at the 2022 World Athletics U20 Championships in Cali, Colombia, becoming the first Jamaican to win a global medal in the discipline. He also reached the final of the discus throw at the championships, placing tenth overall.

In June 2024, Lawrence placed second to Rajindra Campbell at the Jamaican Athletics Championships in Kingston with a throw of 19.58 metres. Lawrence set a personal best of 20.32 metres in placing fourth for the University of Oregon at the 2025 NCAA Outdoor Championships. The mark surpassed his previous best of 20.07 metres, which had stood since Lawrence competed at the 2024 Oregon Twilight meeting, the year he stayed working with coach Brian Blutreich. It also set a new Oregon school record, surpassing the previous best set by Neal Steinhauer in 1966.

Lawrence set a new personal best and University of Oregon record of 19.81 metres in Kansas in January 2026. Competing for the University of Oregon, he set a Jamaican indoor national record of 20.50 metres in placing second at the 2026 NCAA Division I Indoor Track and Field Championships in Fayetteville, Arkansas, bettering the Ashinia Miller effort of 20.48m set indoors in 2024. In June, he qualified for the 2026 NCAA Outdoor Championships, placing fourth overall with a season's best 19.87 metres.
