= 2022 World Athletics U20 Championships – Men's triple jump =

Men's triple jump at the 2022 World Athletics U20 Championships
- Venue: Estadio Olímpico Pascual Guerrero
- Dates: 4 August (qualification); 5 August (final)
- Competitors: 20 from 17 nations
- Winning distance: 17.27

Medalists
gold medal	Jaydon Hibbert	Jamaica
silver medal	Selva P. Thirumaran	India
bronze medal	Viktor Morozov	Estonia

The men's triple jump at the 2022 World Athletics U20 Championships was held at the Estadio Olímpico Pascual Guerrero on 4 and 5 August.

21 athletes from 18 countries were entered to the competition, however after the withdrawal of Theophilus Mudzengerere from Zimbabwe 20 athletes from 17 countries competed.

== Records ==
U20 standing records prior to the 2022 World Athletics U20 Championships were as follows:

Record	Athlete & Nationality	Mark	Location	Date
World U20 Record	Volker Mai (GDR)	17.50	Erfurt, East Germany	23 June 1985
Championship Record	Jordan Díaz (CUB)	17.15	Tampere, Finland	14 July 2018
World U20 Leading	Jaydon Hibbert (JAM)	16.66	Kingston, Jamaica	8 April 2022

== Results ==
=== Qualification ===
The qualification rounds took place on 4 August, in two groups, Group A started at 11:02 and Group B at 12:16. Athletes attaining a mark of at least 15.80 metres ( Q ) or at least the 12 best performers ( q ) qualified for the final. 13th athlete, Royan Walters from Jamaica, advanced to the final by jury of appeal.

Rank	Group	Name	Nationality	Round			Mark	Notes
Rank	Group	Name	Nationality	1	2	3	Mark	Notes
1	B	Jaydon Hibbert	Jamaica	x	16.37		16.37	Q
2	A	Ethan Olivier	New Zealand	15.72	16.04		16.04	Q NU20R
3	A	Selva P. Thirumaran	India	x	15.99		15.99	Q
4	B	Viktor Morozov	Estonia	15.98			15.98	Q PB
5	A	Federico Morseletto	Italy	x	15.70	15.91	15.91	Q PB
6	A	Solomon Washington	United States	15.85			15.85	Q PB
7	B	Grigoris Nikolaou	Cyprus	15.84			15.84	Q PB
8	A	Pasindu Malshan	Sri Lanka	15.65	15.74	14.36	15.73	q
9	B	Federico Lorenzo Bruno	Italy	15.67	15.44		15.67	q
10	B	Floyd Whitaker	United States	15.08	15.10	15.54	15.54	q
11	A	Pascal Boden	Germany	14.87	14.90	15.53	15.53	q
12	B	Lâchezar Vâlchev	Bulgaria	15.30	x	15.27	15.30	q
13	A	Royan Walters	Jamaica	14.96	15.29	15.28	15.29	qJ
14	A	Mesut Bülbül	Turkey	x	x	15.28	15.28	
15	B	Praise Aniamaka	Canada	15.23	15.21	15.05	15.23 w	
16	A	Gor Hovakimyan	Armenia	14.38	15.20	14.94	15.20	
17	A	Aren Spencer	Barbados	14.51	15.04	x	15.04	
18	B	Damilare Olukosi	Nigeria	14.92	14.93	x	14.93	
19	B	Mohamad Shah Sholihin Azshar	Malaysia	14.04	14.56	14.76	14.76	
20	B	Javier Robledo	Colombia	14.46	x	13.58	14.46	

=== Final ===
The final was started at 18:01 on 5 August.

Rank	Name	Nationality	Round						Mark	Notes
Rank	Name	Nationality	1	2	3	4	5	6	Mark	Notes
1st place, gold medalist(s)	Jaydon Hibbert	Jamaica	17.27	16.82	-	-	-	-	17.27	CR
2nd place, silver medalist(s)	Selva P. Thirumaran	India	16.11	16.15	16.09	x	x	x	16.15	PB
3rd place, bronze medalist(s)	Viktor Morozov	Estonia	15.20	15.41	15.96	15.73	16.13	15.60	16.13	PB
4	Ethan Olivier	New Zealand	15.98	15.86	x	16.03	15.98	x	16.03	
5	Floyd Whitaker	United States	x	15.60	15.62	13.42	15.56	16.01	16.01	PB
6	Federico Morseletto	Italy	15.74	15.97	15.72	15.59	15.67	15.86	15.97	PB
7	Federico Lorenzo Bruno	Italy	15.48	15.37	15.78	15.77	15.77	15.81	15.81	PB
8	Solomon Washington	United States	15.55	15.13	15.11	15.05	x	15.19	15.55	
9	Pascal Boden	Germany	14.97	15.15	15.37				15.37	
10	Lâchezar Vâlchev	Bulgaria	15.34	14.98	x				15.34	
11	Pasindu Malshan	Sri Lanka	14.22	15.05	15.14				15.14	
12	Royan Walters	Jamaica	13.92	13.97	-				13.97	
	Grigoris Nikolaou	Cyprus	x	x	x				NM	
