= Iosif Kesidis =

Cypriot athlete (born 2005)

Personal information
- Nationality: Cypriot
- Born: 19 August 2005 (age 21)

Sport
- Sport: Athletics
- Event: Hammer throw

Achievements and titles
- Personal bests: Hammer: 78.61 (Zagreb, 2026) NR
Medal record
Men's athletics
Representing Cyprus
European Throwing Cup
Silver medal – second place	2026 Nicosia	U23 Hammer
Commonwealth Games
Silver medal – second place	2026 Glasgow	Hammer throw
Mediterranean Games
Gold medal – first place	2026 Taranto	Hammer throw
European U23 Championships
Gold medal – first place	2025 Bergen	Hammer throw
World U20 Championships
Gold medal – first place	2024 Lima	Hammer throw
Bronze medal – third place	2022 Cali	Hammer throw
European U20 Championships
Silver medal – second place	2023 Jerusalem	Hammer throw
European U18 Championships
Gold medal – first place	2022 Jerusalem	Hammer throw

Iosif Kesidis (Greek: Ιωσήφ Κεσίδης; born 19 August 2005) is a Cypriot hammer thrower and national record holder. He won the silver medal at the 2026 Commonwealth Games having won gold medals at the 2024 World U20 Championships and the 2025 European U23 Championships.

== Biography ==
He is a member of the development program of the Cyprus Amateur Athletic Association (KOEAS). He is coached by Panicos Charalampous.

He won gold in the hammer throw at the 2022 European Athletics U18 Championships in Jerusalem, Israel, in July 2022. He was a bronze medalist in the hammer throw at the 2022 World Athletics U20 Championships in Cali, Colombia in August 2022 with a 6kg hammer throw of 76.32 metres.

He won silver in the hammer throw at the 2023 European Athletics U20 Championships in Jerusalem. He broke the Cypriot youth record for the men's hammer three times in 2023, ending the year with a best of 71.43m.

In 2024, he increased his personal best to 81.07 metres. He won gold at the 2024 World Athletics U20 Championships in Lima, Peru, in the hammer throw, with a personal best 6kg distance, and national under-20 record of 82.80 metres. It was a dominant performance, every throw Kesidis made would have been sufficient to win the gold medal. In September 2024, he was nominated for the European Athletics Rising Star award.

He was victorious at the European Throwing Cup in March 2025 in Nicosia, winning the U23 hammer competition. His distance of 72.96 metres broke his own Cypriot under-23 record. It was the first ever gold medal for Cyprus in the competition. In July 2025, he threw a new personal best and national U23 record of 74.87 metres to win the gold medal at the 2025 European Athletics U23 Championships in Bergen, Norway.

On 14 March 2026, he won the silver medal in the U23 hammer throw behind Ármin Szabados of Hungary, at the 2026 European Throwing Cup in Nicosia, Cyprus with a throw of 74.16 metres. Competing at the Boris Hanzekovic Memorial in Zagreb, a World Athletics Continental Tour Gold meeting, on 26 June, he improved his own Cypriot national record to 78.61 metres. On 27 July, he won the silver medal with 76.97 metres, finishing behind world champion Ethan Katzberg, at the 2026 Commonwealth Games in Glasgow, Scotland. In August 2026, he was a finalist competing at the 2026 European Athletics Championships in Birmingham, England, in the hammer throw.

== Personal life ==
He is from Paphos. He graduated from Paphos sports school in 2023.
