= Brandon Pottinger =

Jamaican athlete (born 2004)

Personal information
- Nationality: Jamaican American
- Born: 8 June 2004 (age 22)
- Home town: Florida, USA

Sport
- Sport: Track and Field
- Event: High Jump
- College team: Tennessee Volunteers; Clemson Tigers

Achievements and titles
- Personal best: High Jump: 2.16 m (2022)
Medal record
Men's athletics
Representing Jamaica
World U20 Championships
Gold medal – first place	2022 Cali	High jump
Pan American U20 Championships
Bronze medal – third place	2023 Mayagüez	High jump
NACAC U18 Championships
Silver medal – second place	2021 San José	High jump
CARIFTA Games Junior (U20)
Gold medal – first place	2023 Nassau	High jump
Silver medal – second place	2022 Kingston	High jump
CARIFTA Games Junior (U17)
Bronze medal – third place	2019 George Town	High jump

Brandon Pottinger (born 8 June 2004) is a Jamaican track and field athlete. He won the gold medal at the 2022 IAAF World Junior Championships in the high jump.

== Personal life ==
Pottinger attended Palmer Trinity Catholic High in Florida and currently attends Clemson University. As of June 2026, he is a senior. Pottinger qualifies to compete for Jamaica through parental links - his father Marlon Pottinger was a former Kingston College athlete.

== Career ==
The Jamaican U20 high jump champion, he won the high jump at the 2022 IAAF World Junior Championships with a new personal best jump of 2.14m in Cali, Colombia. This put him ahead of the South African Brian Raats in silver and Bulgarian bronze medalist Bozhidar Saraboyukov. It was Jamaica's first ever high jump gold medal at an international championship.
