= Brian Raats =

South African athlete (born 2004)

Brian Raats OLY
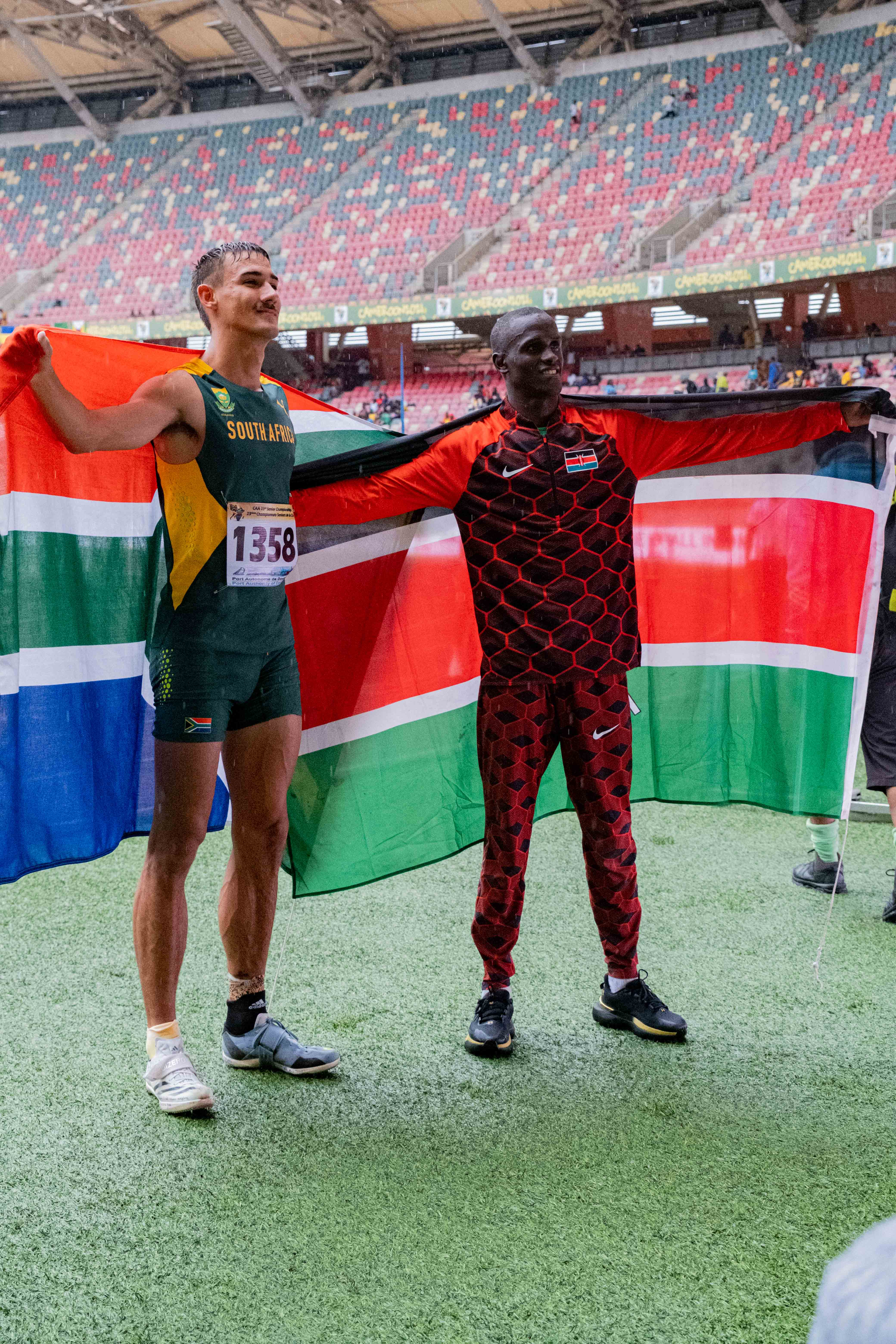
- Brian Raats (left) at the 2024 African Championships

Personal information
- Nationality: South African
- Born: 17 January 2004 (age 22)
- Relatives: Charl Raats (Father), Elsabe Raats (Mother), Muranda Klaassen (Sister), Diane Oosthuizen (Sister)

Sport
- Sport: Track and Field
- Event: High Jump

Achievements and titles
- Personal best: High jump: 2.26m (2022)
Medal record
Men's athletics
Representing South Africa
African Championships
Gold medal – first place	2024 Douala	High jump
World U20 Championships
Silver medal – second place	2022 Cali	High jump
African U20 Championships
Gold medal – first place	2023 Ndola	High jump

Brian Raats OLY (born 17 January 2004) is a South African track and field athlete. In 2024, he became national champion in the high jump.

== Biography ==
In 2022, aged 18 years-old, Raats jumped a personal best in the high jump of 2.26 metres in Potchefstroom. He finished second in the high jump at the 2022 World Athletics U20 Championships in Cali, Colombia. In 2022, he was nominated for South African Junior Athlete of the Year.

In March 2023, he won the South African U20 high jump title with a jump of 2.20 metres. He then won the gold medal at the African U20 Championships in Ndola, Zambia in 2023 with a jump of 2.15 metres.

In April 2024, he became the senior national high jump champion at the South African Athletics Championships in Pietermaritzburg.

He competed at the 2024 Summer Olympics, where he qualified for the final, finishing in twelfth place overall.

In September 2025, he competed at the 2025 World Athletics Championships in Tokyo, Japan.
