= 2022 World Athletics U20 Championships – Men's high jump =

Men's high jump at the 2022 World Athletics U20 Championships
- Venue: Estadio Olímpico Pascual Guerrero
- Dates: 2 August (qualification); 5 August (final)
- Competitors: 16 from 15 nations
- Winning height: 2.14 m

Medalists
gold medal	Brandon Pottinger	Jamaica
silver medal	Brian Raats	South Africa
silver medal	Bozhidar Sarâboyukov	Bulgaria

The men's high jump at the 2022 World Athletics U20 Championships was held at Estadio Olímpico Pascual Guerrero on 2 and 5 August.

== Records ==
World U20 Record	Dragutin Topić (YUG)	2.37	Plovdiv, Bulgaria	12 August 1990
World U20 Record	Steve Smith (GBR)	2.37	Seoul, South Korea	20 September 1992
Championship Record	Dragutin Topić (YUG)	2.37	Plovdiv, Bulgaria	12 August 1990
Championship Record	Steve Smith (GBR)	2.37	Seoul, South Korea	20 September 1992
World U20 Leading	Brian Raats (RSA)	2.26	Potchefstroom, South Africa	5 April 2022

== Results ==
=== Qualification ===
The qualification round took place on 2 August, in two groups, both starting at 10:20 Athletes attaining a mark of at least 2.16 metres ( Q ) or at least the 12 best performers ( q ) qualified for the final.

Rank	Group	Name	Nationality	2.00	2.04	2.08	Mark	Notes
1	B	Brian Raats	South Africa	–	o	o	2.08	q
2	B	Edoardo Stronati	Italy	xo	–	o	2.08	q
2	B	Martin Lefèvre	France	xo	o	o	2.08	q
4	B	Brandon Pottinger	Jamaica	–	o	xo	2.08	q
4	B	Igor Kosolapov	Kazakhstan	o	o	xo	2.08	q
6	A	Yeh Po-ting	Chinese Taipei	o	xxo	xo	2.08	q
7	B	Anderson Asprilla	Colombia	o	o	xxo	2.08	q
8	A	Bozhidar Sarâboyukov	Bulgaria	xo	o	xxo	2.08	q
8	A	Mátyás Guth	Hungary	o	xo	xxo	2.08	q
10	A	Mattia Furlani	Italy	o	o	xxx	2.04	q
10	B	Sandro Jeršin Tomassini	Slovenia	o	o	xxx	2.04	q
12	A	Lachlan O'Keefe	Australia	xxo	o	xxx	2.04	q
13	B	Grigorios Chasos	Greece	o	xo	xxx	2.04	
	A	David Aya	Nigeria	xxx			NM	
	A	Kristján Viggó Sigfinnsson	Iceland	–	–	xxx	NM	
	B	Martin Mlinarić	Croatia	xxx			NM	
	A	Aaron Antoine	Trinidad and Tobago	DNS				

=== Final ===
The final was held on 5 August at 15:21.

Rank	Name	Nationality	2.00	2.05	2.10	2.14	2.17	2.19	2.20	Mark	Notes
1st place, gold medalist(s)	Brandon Pottinger	Jamaica	–	xo	o	xo	–	–	x	2.14	
2nd place, silver medalist(s)	Brian Raats	South Africa	–	o	o	xxx				2.10	
2nd place, silver medalist(s)	Bozhidar Sarâboyukov	Bulgaria	o	o	o	xxx				2.10	
4	Martin Lefèvre	France	o	xo	xo	xxx				2.10	
5	Mátyás Guth	Hungary	o	xo	xxo	xxx				2.10	
5	Yeh Po-ting	Chinese Taipei	o	xo	xxo	xxx				2.10	
7	Anderson Asprilla	Colombia	o	o	xxx					2.05	
8	Mattia Furlani	Italy	xo	o	xxx					2.05	
8	Lachlan O'Keefe	Australia	xo	o	xxx					2.05	
10	Sandro Jeršin Tomassini	Slovenia	o	xxo	xxx					2.05	
10	Igor Kosolapov	Kazakhstan	o	xxo	xxx					2.05	
12	Edoardo Stronati	Italy	o	–	xxx					2.00	
