= Emma Gates =

American high jumper (born 2004)

Personal information
- Born: 7 May 2004 (age 22)

Sport
- Sport: Athletics
- Event: High jump

Achievements and titles
- Personal best(s): High jump: 1.91 m (Tucson, 2025)

Emma Gates (born 7 May 2004) is an American high jumper. She competed at the 2025 World Championships having finished third at the 2025 USA Outdoor Track and Field Championships.

== Biography ==
Gates competed in high jump from the age of nine years-old but also took part in cross country running and running on the track. She won her age-group high jump title at the USATF National Junior Olympic Track & Field Championships in Sacramento, California in August 2016. She competed as a member of Salem Track Club.

Gates attended Cascade High School in Turner, Oregon and in her freshman year in 2019, Gates won the OSAA Class 4A state championship in the high jump as well setting leading times in the sprint events. Her college days were impacted by the COVID-19 pandemic, before winning state titles again in 2021 and 2022. That year she committed to compete for the University of Arizona.

In June 2022, she finished in second place at the USATF U20 Championships. She subsequently competed for the United States at the 2022 World Athletics U20 Championships in Cali, Colombia, where she qualified for the final, placing eleventh overall in August 2025.

Gates won the PAC-12 Championships in Boulder, Colorado in 2024 with a jump of 1.88 metres. She qualified for the final of the 2024 US Olympic Trials, placing tenth overall.

Gates set a new personal best of 1.91 metres at the Desert Heat Classic in Tucson, Arizona in May 2025. She finished third at the 2025 USA Outdoor Track and Field Championships in Eugene, Oregon on 1 August 2025, with a personal best equalling clearance of 1.91 metres.

In September 2025, Gates competed at the 2025 World Athletics Championships in Tokyo, Japan, clearing 1.88 metres without advancing to the final.

Gates equalled her personal best with a jump of 1.91 meters at the Dr. Martin Luther King Jr. Invitational in Albuquerque, New Mexico, in January 2026. Gates placed fourth overall with 1.85 metres at the 2026 NCAA Division I Indoor Track and Field Championships. Later that year, she also qualified for the 2026 NCAA Outdoor Championships.
