= Zara Obamakinwa =

British athlete (born 2004)

Personal information
- Nationality: British
- Born: 30 March 2004 (age 22)

Sport
- Sport: Athletics
- Event: Discus throw
- Club: Blackheath & Bromley AC

Achievements and titles
- Personal best: Discus: 61.87 m (2026)

Zara Obamakinwa (born 30 March 2004) is a British discus thrower. A national under-20 record holder she went on to win the 2025 and the 2026 UK Athletics Championships.

She competed for Great Britain at the European Throwing Cup and the European Athletics Team Championships in 2025.

== Early life ==
From Strood, she started-out competing in shot put before trying the discus throw for the first time in 2016 under coach Mark Chapman. She attended Queen Anne's School in Caversham where she completed A-levels in computer science, maths, and physics.

== Career ==
Obamakinwa reached the final of the 2022 World Athletics U20 Championships in Cali, Colombia. Competing as a Blackheath & Bromley athlete, she broke the 16-year-old British under-20 national record with 55.99m when winning bronze at the 2023 British Athletics Championships.

Obamakinwa finished second with a throw of 53.23 metres at the 2024 British Athletics Championships. In November 2024, she was named by British Athletics on the Olympic Futures Programme for 2025.

On 1 March 2025, she threw a personal best 55.06 metres at the UK Winter Long Throws Championships, in Loughborough. She was selected to represent Great Britain at the European Throwing Cup later that month. In May 2025, she increased her personal best again, to 58.17 metres whilst competing in London, and then won the discus at the Loughborough International competing for England, with a throw of 57.25 metres.

Obamakinwa was selected for the 2025 European Athletics Team Championships in Madrid in June 2025, placing fourteenth overall, helping the Great Britain team to finish in fifth place overall. She was named in the British team for the 2025 European Athletics U23 Championships in Bergen.

On 3 August 2025, she became the British discus throw champion, after winning the title at the 2025 UK Athletics Championships in Birmingham with a throw of 55.90 metres. In October 2025, she was retained on the British Athletics Olympic Futures Programme for 2025/26.

On 28 February 2026, at the Winter Long Throws Championships in Loughborough, Obamakinwa threw a new championship best 56.60m to win the discus title. On 21 June 2026, she won the discus throw at the 2026 UK Athletics Championships, sealing the win with a throw of 55.85 metres in the final round. In July, she threw 58.21 metres to also win the discus title at the 2026 England Athletics Championships and improved her personal best later that month with 61.87m competing in the National Athletics League. On 12 August, she represented Great Britain at the 2026 European Athletics Championships in Birmingham, England. In October 2026, she was retained on the 2026/27 Olympic Futures Programme awarded by UK Athletics.
