= Serina Riedel =

German athlete (born 2003)

Personal information
- Born: 12 April 2003 (age 23)

Sport
- Sport: Athletics
- Event: Heptathlon

Achievements and titles
- Personal best(s): Heptathlon: 6322 (Götzis, 2025); Pentathlon: 4440 (Halle, 2026)
Medal record
Women's athletics
Representing Germany
European U23 Championships
Bronze medal – third place	2025 Bergen	Heptathlon
World U20 Championships
Silver medal – second place	2022 Cali	Heptathlon

Serina Riedel (born 12 April 2003) is a German multi-event athlete.

== Career ==
Riedel began training in athletics at TSV Zeulenroda in her childhood and was jumping four metres in the long jump by the time she was nine years-old. She broke the German under-18 record for the heptathlon, previously held by Maren Freisen, in August 2020 at the German Combined Events Championships in Vaterstetten, scoring 5,818 points, having come close to breaking the record the previous month in Halle, missing the record by just 22 points.

Riedel won a silver medal in August 2022 at the 2022 World Athletics U20 Championships in the two-day heptathlon event in Cali, Colombia, finishing behind gold medal winner Saga Vanninen but ahead of compatriot Sandrina Sprengel, having been fifth in the competition after the first day of the event.

Reidel passed 6000 points for the heptathlon for the first time in winning the Thorpe Cup in July 2024 with 6078 points 2024, finishing ahead of Allie Jones of the United States, who scored 6062 points.

Riedel set a personal best of 6322 points for the heptathlon at the 2025 Hypo-Meeting in Götzis, placing seventh overall, with her tally including four individual personal bests. She was a bronze medalist in the heptathlon at the 2025 European Athletics U23 Championships in Bergen, Norway, in July, finishing behind gold medal winner Saga Vanninen and silver medalist Abigail Pawlett of Great Britain, winning bronze with 6183 points and overtaking Greek athlete Anastasia Ntragkomirova in the final race, over 800 metres.

Riedel won the pentathlon at the German Indoor Combined Events Championships in February 2026, with a total of 4440 points.
