= Jaydon Hibbert =

Jamaican athlete (born 2005)

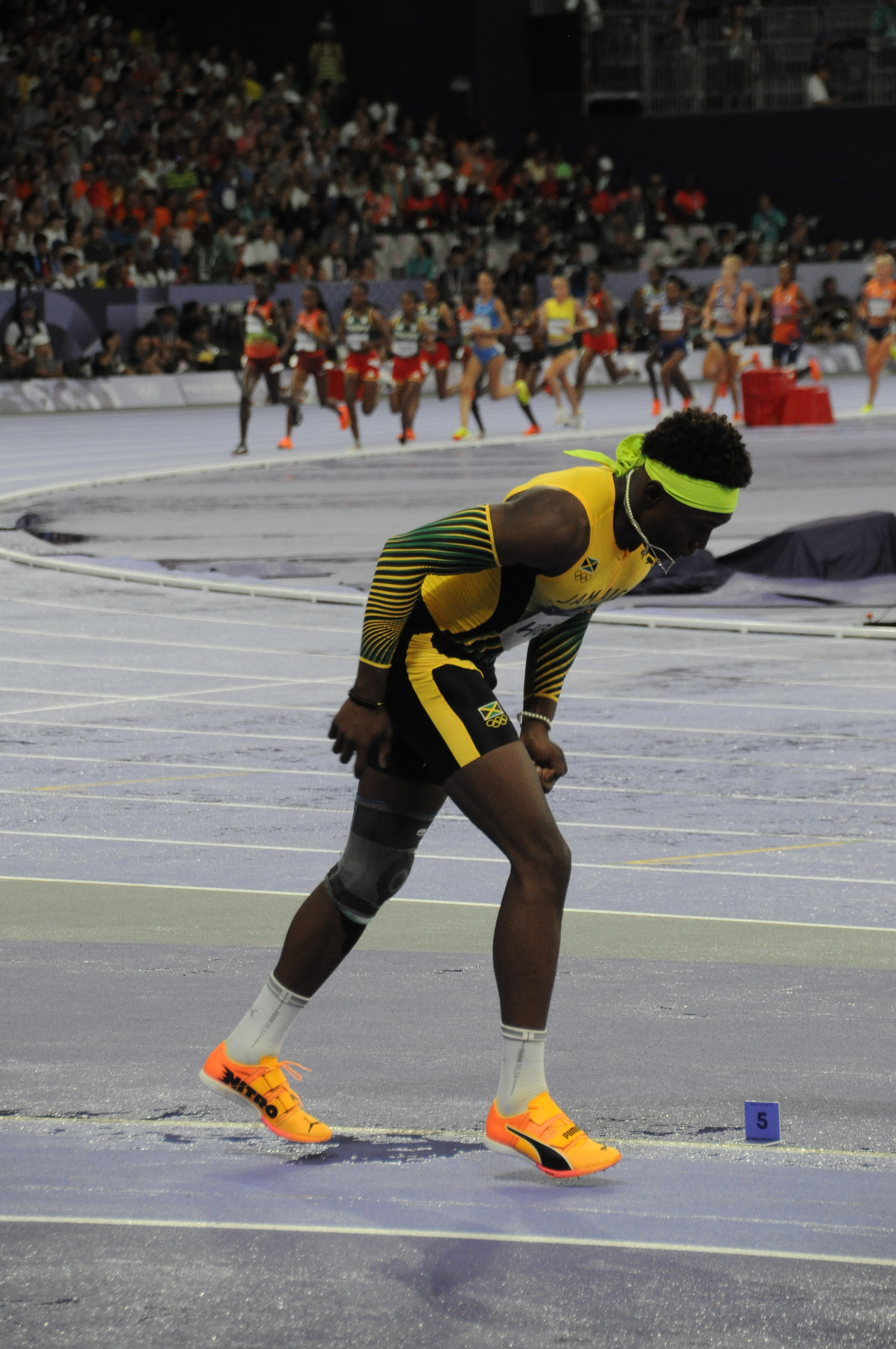
- 2024 Summer Olympics

Personal information
- Born: 17 January 2005 (age 21) Kingston, Jamaica
- Height: 5 ft 10 in (178 cm)

Sport
- Sport: Track and Field
- Events: Long jump, Triple jump
- College team: Arkansas Razorbacks
- Coached by: Georgi Pomashki; Travis Geopfert

Achievements and titles
- Personal bests: Triple jump: 17.87 WU20R (Baton Rouge 2023); Indoors; Triple jump: 17.54 WU20R NR (Albuquerque 2023)
Medal record
Men's athletics
Representing Jamaica
World U20 Championships
Gold medal – first place	2022 Cali	Triple jump
Silver medal – second place	2021 Nairobi	Triple jump
CARIFTA Games (U20)
Gold medal – first place	2022 Kingston	Long jump
Gold medal – first place	2022 Kingston	Triple jump
Gold medal – first place	2023 Nassau	Triple jump
NACAC Championships (U18)
Gold medal – first place	2021 San José	Triple jump
Silver medal – second place	2021 San José	Long jump

Jaydon Hibbert (born 17 January 2005) is a Jamaican track and field athlete. At the age of 17, he won the gold medal in the triple jump at the 2022 World Under-20 Championships, after silver in the previous 2021 edition.

Hibbert holds the world U20 outdoor and indoor records in the triple jump and the Jamaican senior record at the latter.

On 14 December 2023, Hibbert would go on to win the prestigious Bowerman award - collegiate track and field's version of the Heisman.

== Biography ==
Jaydon Hibbert attended Kingston College in Kingston. Upon graduation in 2022 he enrolled at University of Arkansas and began competing for Arkansas Razorbacks track and field team, joining compatriots Wayne Pinnock and Carey McLeod, amongst others.

== Career ==
Hibbert made his international debut at age 16, in July 2021, at the NACAC Under-18 Championships in Athletics held in San José, Costa Rica, where he won the triple jump competition and placed second in the long jump. The following month, competing against athletes up to three years his senior, he took the silver medal for the triple jump at the World U20 Championships in Nairobi, Kenya with a leap of 16.05 m.

== 2022 ==
In April 2022, Hibbert won both the long jump and the triple jump titles at the 2022 CARIFTA Games in Kingston. In June that year, he won the senior triple jump title at the Jamaican Championships held also in Kingston. In August, he broke the championship record with his first jump in the final of the World U20 Championships in Cali, Colombia. Measured at 17.27 m it was a personal best by 61 cm and placed him second on the U18 all-time list. In fact, his second jump of 16.82 m would also have been enough to win the competition.

== 2023 ==
In March 2023, Hibbert set an outright world U20 triple jump record, jumping 17.54 m to take the title at the NCAA Division I Indoor Championships in Albuquerque, New Mexico. He beat the outdoor mark of 17.50 m that had stood for 38 years and the 1986 collegiate indoor record. In May, the 18-year-old sailed out to 17.87 m at the SEC Championships in Baton Rouge, Louisiana, to move up to 13th on the world all-time list. He improved directly the old world U20 record and even older NCAA best set back in 1982.

In July 2023 Hibbert signed an NIL deal with Puma.

Hibbert qualified first for the final of the triple jump with a jump of 17.70m at the 2023 World Athletics Championships in Budapest. However, he had to pull out of the event with a hamstring strain.

== 2024 ==
He jumped 17.57 metres to win the Jamaica International in May 2024. He bettered that with a 17.75 metres jump to win the Racers Grand Prix in Kingston, Jamaica on 1 June 2024. He competed in the triple jump at the 2024 Paris Olympics, placing fourth overall.

== 2025 ==
In 2025, Hibbert was one of a number of Jamaican athletes including Pinnock, Roje Stona and Rajindra Campbell who were reportedly incentivised to change their international allegiance to European country Turkey.

== 2026 ==
Önder Özbilen, the team coordinator for Turkey's Olympic athletics team, confirmed in March 2026 that Hibbert, along with fellow Jamaican-born field athletes Rajindra Campbell, Rojé Stona and Wayne Pinnock were applying to switch international allegiance to Turkey ahead of the 2028 Olympic Games, as well as Nigerian sprinter Favour Ofili and Russian-born heptathlete Sophia Yakushina. The applications were declined by World Athletics in April 2026 as "inconsistent with the core principles of the regulations". On 4 June, he placed third at the 2026 Golden Gala in Rome, part of the 2026 Diamond League.

== Achievements ==
All information from World Athletics profile.

=== Personal bests ===
- Long jump – 7.87 m (25 ft 9 3/4 in) (Kingston 2022)
- Triple jump – 17.87 m (58 ft 7 1/2 in) (Baton Rouge, LA 2023) WU20R
- Triple jump U18 – 17.27 m (56 ft 7 3/4 in) (Cali 2022) NU18R
  - Triple jump indoor – 17.54 m (57 ft 6 1/2 in) (Albuquerque, NM 2023) WU20R NR

=== International competitions ===
Representing Jamaica
Year	Competition	Venue	Position	Event	Result	Notes
2021	NACAC U18 Championships	San José, Costa Rica	2nd	Long jump	7.31	
2021	NACAC U18 Championships	San José, Costa Rica	1st	Triple jump	16.02	NU18R
2021	World U20 Championships	Nairobi, Kenya	2nd	Triple jump	16.05	NU18R
2022	CARIFTA Games (U20)	Kingston, Jamaica	1st	Long jump	7.62	
2022	CARIFTA Games (U20)	Kingston, Jamaica	1st	Triple jump	17.05	w
2022	World U20 Championships	Cali, Colombia	1st	Triple jump	17.27	CR NU18R
2023	World Championships	Budapest, Hungary	12th	Triple jump	17.70 m^{1}	
2024	Olympic Games	Paris, France	4th	Triple jump	17.61 m	

^{1}No mark in the final

=== National and NCAA titles ===
- Jamaican Athletics Championships
  - Triple jump: 2022
- NCAA Division I Men's Indoor Track and Field Championships
  - Triple jump: 2023

Year	Competition	Venue	Position	Event	Notes
Representing Arkansas Razorbacks
2023	2023 NCAA Division I Outdoor Track and Field Championships	University of Texas at Austin; Mike A. Myers Stadium	1st	Triple jump	17.56 m (57 ft 7 in)
2023	SEC Outdoor Track and Field Championships	Louisiana State University; Bernie Moore Track Stadium	1st	Triple jump	17.87 m (58 ft 8 in) CR WU20R
2023	2023 NCAA Division I Indoor Track and Field Championships	Albuquerque, New Mexico	1st	Triple jump	17.54 m (57 ft 7 in) MR CR NR WU20R
2023	SEC Indoor Track and Field Championships	University of Arkansas; Randal Tyson Track Center	1st	Triple jump	17.10 m (56 ft 1 in)
