= 2022 World Athletics U20 Championships – Men's shot put =

Men's shot put at the 2022 World Athletics U20 Championships
- Venue: Estadio Olímpico Pascual Guerrero
- Dates: 1 August (qualification); 2 August (final)
- Competitors: 27 from 19 nations
- Winning distance: 20.73 m

Medalists
gold medal	Tarik Robinson-O'Hagan	United States
silver medal	Kobe Lawrence	Jamaica
bronze medal	Tizian Lauria	Germany

The men's shot put at the 2022 World Athletics U20 Championships was held at Estadio Olímpico Pascual Guerrero on 1 and 2 August.

== Records ==
Standing records prior to the 2022 World Athletics U20 Championships
World U20 Record	Jacko Gill (NZL)	23.00	Auckland, New Zealand	18 August 2013
Championship Record	Jacko Gill (NZL)	22.20	Barcelona, Spain	11 July 2012
World U20 Leading	Tizian Lauria (GER)	21.15	Riederich, Germany	15 June 2022

== Results ==
=== Qualification ===
The qualification round took place on 2 August, in two groups, both starting at 10:20 Athletes attaining a mark of at least 19.60 metres ( Q ) or at least the 12 best performers ( q ) qualified for the final.

Rank	Group	Name	Nationality	Round			Mark	Notes
Rank	Group	Name	Nationality	1	2	3	Mark	Notes
1	B	Tizian Lauria	Germany	19.53	19.52	20.15	20.15	Q
2	B	Kobe Lawrence	Jamaica	18.35	18.48	19.85	19.85	Q
3	B	Tarik Robinson-O'Hagan	United States	19.65			19.65	Q, PB
4	B	Mátyás Kerékgyártó	Hungary	19.33	19.35	19.05	19.35	q
5	B	Jonah Chang Anak Rigan	Malaysia	x	18.05	18.97	18.97	q
6	A	Leo Zikovic	Sweden	18.88	18.45	18.27	18.88	q, PB
7	A	Karel Šula	Slovakia	18.73	x	18.62	18.73	q
8	B	Jesper Ahlin	Sweden	x	18.66	18.17	18.66	q
9	B	Andreas De Lathauwer	Belgium	18.43	x	18.47	18.47	q
10	A	Lukas Schober	Germany	18.32	18.44	x	18.44	q
11	A	Juan Manuel Arrieguez	Argentina	17.63	18.21	18.41	18.41	q
12	A	Jakub Korejba	Poland	x	x	18.37	18.37	q
13	A	Sanyam Sanjay	India	18.36	x	18.03	18.36	
14	B	Aiden Smith	South Africa	17.17	18.32	18.07	18.32	
15	B	Sawan	India	18.31	18.30	18.06	18.31	
16	B	Márk Horváth	Hungary	x	18.27	x	18.27	
17	A	Christopher Young	Jamaica	18.13	x	x	18.13	
18	B	Spencer Lewis	Canada	x	x	18.04	18.04	
19	A	Cian de Villiers	South Africa	x	17.74	16.63	17.74	
20	B	Damian Rodziak	Poland	x	17.62	x	17.62	
21	B	Andri Matrov	Estonia	17.53	x	x	17.53	
22	A	Rokas Domanaitis	Lithuania	x	17.47	x	17.47	
23	A	Cade Moran	United States	17.20	17.32	17.44	17.44	
24	A	Emmanuel Segond Musumary	Italy	x	16.83	17.35	17.35	
25	A	Theofanis Mavrodontis	Greece	15.19	15.12	16.50	16.50	
26	B	Darwin Meneses	Colombia	14.53	x	x	14.53	
	A	Tayjo Oppong-Adjei	Turks and Caicos Islands	x	x	x	NM	
	A	Arsalan Ghashghaei	Iran	DNS				

=== Final ===
The final was held on 2 August at 17:16.

Rank	Name	Nationality	Round						Mark	Notes
Rank	Name	Nationality	1	2	3	4	5	6	Mark	Notes
1st place, gold medalist(s)	Tarik Robinson-O'Hagan	United States	20.30	20.03	x	20.73	20.08	20.20	20.73	PB
2nd place, silver medalist(s)	Kobe Lawrence	Jamaica	x	20.36	19.42	19.87	20.58	18.80	20.58	PB
3rd place, bronze medalist(s)	Tizian Lauria	Germany	x	19.34	19.94	20.40	19.97	20.55	20.55	
4	Lukas Schober	Germany	18.84	19.21	19.43	19.27	x	19.08	19.43	
5	Karel Šula	Slovakia	18.46	18.66	18.73	18.88	18.60	x	18.88	
6	Mátyás Kerékgyártó	Hungary	18.31	18.42	18.82	18.31	18.32	18.68	18.82	
7	Jesper Ahlin	Sweden	18.36	18.18	18.50	x	18.62	18.40	18.62	
8	Juan Manuel Arrieguez	Argentina	17.91	18.54	x	18.14	18.28	18.17	18.54	
9	Leo Zikovic	Sweden	18.22	18.37	x				18.37	
10	Jakub Korejba	Poland	x	17.64	18.31				18.31	
11	Andreas De Lathauwer	Belgium	17.29	17.60	17.69				17.69	
	Jonah Chang Anak Rigan	Malaysia	x	x	x				NM	
