= Mico Lampinen =

Finnish athlete (born 2006)

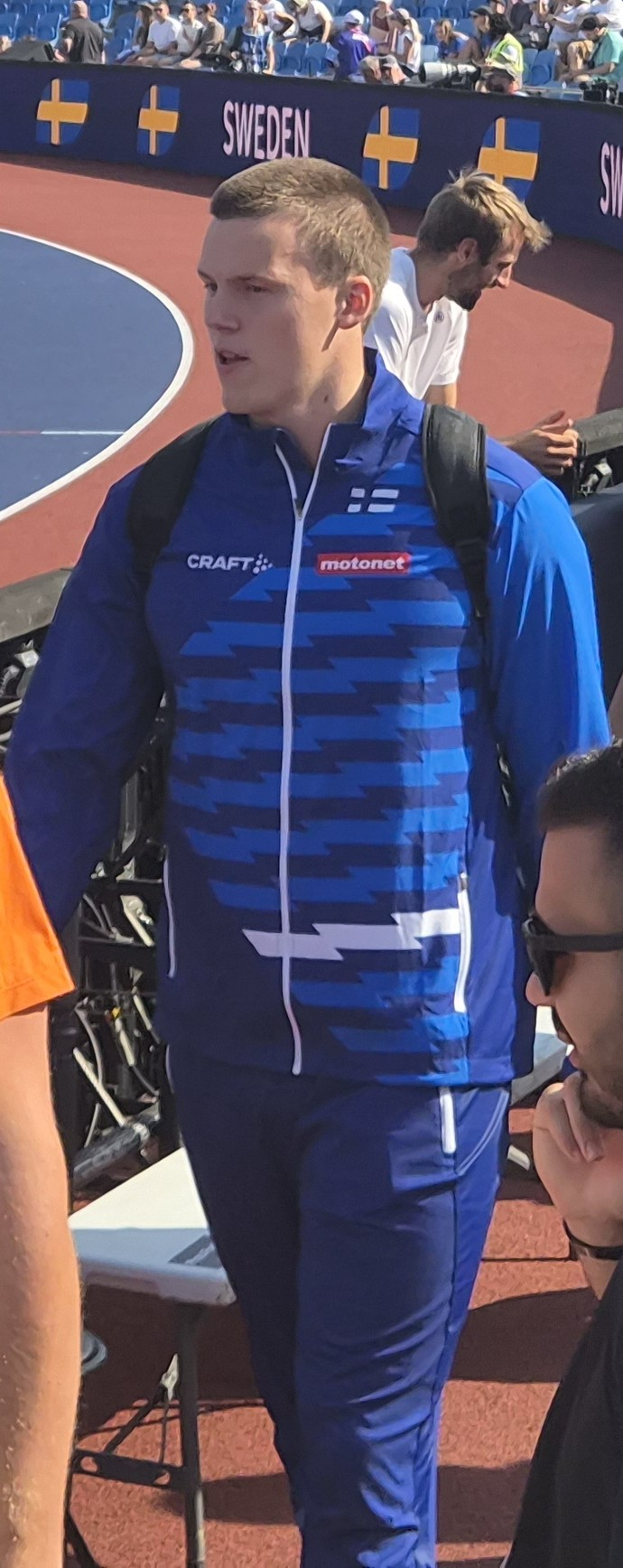
- 2026 European Championships

Personal information
- Born: 9 February 2006 (age 20)

Sport
- Sport: Athletics
- Events: Discus throw, Hammer throw

Achievements and titles
- Personal bests: Discus: 58.81m (Espoo, 2025); Discus (1.75kg): 62.74m (Uppsala, 2025) NU20R
Medal record
Men's athletics
Representing Finland
World U20 Championships
Bronze medal – third place	2024 Lima	Discus
European U20 Championships
Silver medal – second place	2025 Tampere	Hammer throw
European Youth Olympic Festival
Silver medal – second place	2022 Banská Bystrica	Hammer throw
Bronze medal – third place	2022 Banská Bystrica	Discus

Mico Lampinen (born 9 February 2006) is a Finnish athlete who competes in the hammer and discus throw.

== Biography ==
Lampinen trained as a member of KU-58 Vantaa and as a member of the Helsinki Metropolitan Area Sports Academy Urhea, coached by Tero Lampinen. He won a silver medal in the hammer throw at the 2022 European Youth Summer Olympic Festival in Banská Bystrica, Slovakia.

He won the Finnish Athletics Championships in the discus throw in June 2024. He was a bronze medalist in the discus throw at the 2024 World Athletics U20 Championships in Lima, Peru with a national under-20 record of 62.20 metres. He also competed in the hammer throw at the championships.

At the Nordic U20 Championships in July 2025, he won the 6 kg hammer throw with 73.10m before also winning the 1.75 kg discus title. That month, he was selected for the 2025 European Athletics U20 Championships in Tampere, Finland. He won the silver medal in the hammer throw with a personal best 74.69 metres, to finish behind Armin Szabados of Hungary. He also competed at the championships in the discus throw, qualifying for the final and placing fourth overall.

Competing in the United States, Lampinen had a fourth-place finish in the hammer throw at the 2026 Big Ten Championships. On 12 June, he placed eighth in the discus final at the 2026 NCAA Outdoor Championships, with 61.89 metres. In August, he competed at the 2026 European Athletics Championships in Birmingham, England, in the discus throw.

== Personal life ==
From Sälinkää, his brother Max Lampinen also competes as a hammer thrower. At 202 centimetres tall, he initially feared he had grown to be too tall for the hammer throw, given historically hammer throwers have had a lower power base, but he stated that he took heart from the performances of Ethan Katzberg and Wojciech Nowicki, who are both taller than the average hammer thrower. In 2025, he committed to attend the University of Southern California in the United States.
