= Selva Prabhu =

Indian triple jumper (born 2004)

Personal information
- Full name: Selva Prabhu Thirumaran
- Born: 28 December 2004 (age 21) Madurai, Tamil Nadu, India

Sport
- Sport: Athletics
- Event: Triple jump
- College team: Kansas State Wildcats
- Coached by: Yoandri Betanzos

Achievements and titles
- Personal best: 17.05 m (2026)
Medal record
Men's athletics
Representing India
Commonwealth Games
Bronze medal – third place	2026 Glasgow	Triple jump
World U20 Championships
Silver medal – second place	2022 Cali	Triple jump

Selva Prabhu Thirumaran (born 28 December 2004) is an Indian triple jumper. He won the silver medal in the men's triple jump at the 2022 World U20 Championships, and the bronze medal in the men's triple jump at the 2026 Commonwealth Games.

== Biography ==
Selva Prabhu Thirumaran hails from Madurai in Tamil Nadu. He trained under Yoandri Betanzos at the Inspire Institute of Sports in Ballari. He won gold medals at the 2022 Khelo India Youth Games and the U20 Federation Cup, and silver medals at the Inter-University Championships and the Khelo India University Games.

In the men's triple jump at the 2022 World U20 Championships in Cali, Selva Prabhu won the silver medal with a personal best jump of 16.15 m (53.0 ft). He registered a new personal best and set an Indian junior national record of 16.78 m (55.1 ft) at the Venizelia-Chania International Meet in Greece in 2023, which moved him into the top-ten on the Indian all-time list. Later that year, he became the first Indian to be named Asian Under-20 Male Athlete of the Year by Asian Athletics Association (AAA).

In January 2026, competing for Kansas State University in the United States, Selva Prabhu jumped 16.49 m (54.1 ft) to win the Thane Baker athletics meet in Manhattan, Kansas. In March 2026, he finished second at the 2026 NCAA Division I Indoor Championships held at Fayetteville, Arkansas, with a personal best 17.05 m (55.9 ft). On 12 June, he registered his outdoor season's best of 16.92 m (55.5 ft) to win the triple jump title at the 2026 NCAA Division I Outdoor Championships in Eugene, Oregon. On 1 August 2026, he won the bronze medal in the men's triple jump event at the 2026 Commonwealth Games in Glasgow, with a best jump of 16.52 m (54.2 ft).
