= 2023 European Athletics Indoor Championships – Women's high jump =

Women's high jump at the 2023 European Athletics Indoor Championships
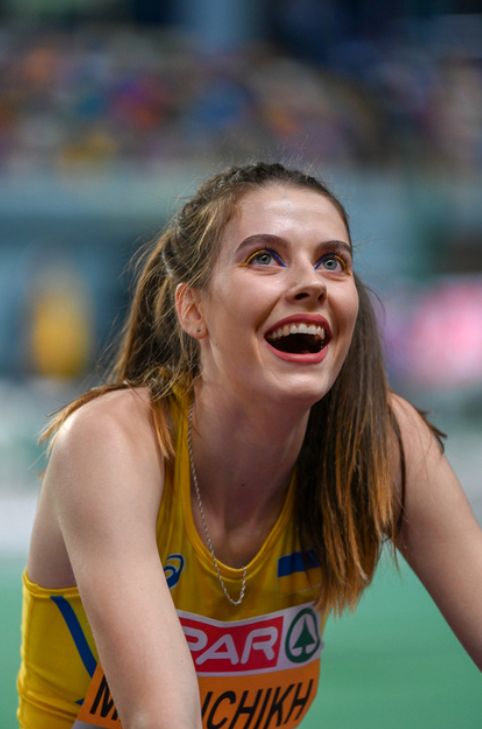
- Yaroslava Mahuchikh won the gold medal.
- Venue: Ataköy Athletics Arena
- Location: Istanbul, Turkey
- Dates: 2 March 2023 (qualification); 5 March 2023 (final)
- Competitors: 17 from 13 nations
- Winning mark: 1.98 m

Medalists
gold medal	Yaroslava Mahuchikh	Ukraine
silver medal	Britt Weerman	Netherlands
bronze medal	Kateryna Tabashnyk	Ukraine

The women's high jump event at the 2023 European Athletics Indoor Championships was held on 2 March at 19:05 (qualification) and 5 March at 10:20 (final) local time.

== Records ==
Standing records prior to the 2023 European Athletics Indoor Championships
World record	Kajsa Bergqvist (SWE)	2.08	Arnstadt, Germany	4 February 2006
European record	Kajsa Bergqvist (SWE)	2.08	Arnstadt, Germany	4 February 2006
Championship record	Tia Hellebaut (BEL)	2.05	Birmingham, United Kingdom	3 March 2007
World Leading	Yaroslava Mahuchikh (UKR)	2.02	Metz, France	11 February 2023
European Leading	Yaroslava Mahuchikh (UKR)	2.02	Metz, France	11 February 2023

== Results ==
=== Qualification ===
Qualification: Qualifying performance 1.94 (Q) or at least 8 best performers (q) advance to the Final.

Rank	Athlete	Nationality	1.76	1.82	1.87	1.91	1.94	Result	Note
1	Yuliia Levchenko	Ukraine	–	o	o	o		1.91	q
2	Yaroslava Mahuchikh	Ukraine	–	–	xx-	o		1.91	q
3	Christina Honsel	Germany	o	o	o	xo		1.91	q
3	Daniela Stanciu	Romania	o	o	o	xo		1.91	q
3	Angelina Topić	Serbia	o	o	o	xo		1.91	q
6	Kateryna Tabashnyk	Ukraine	o	xo	o	xo		1.91	q
6	Britt Weerman	Netherlands	–	xo	o	xo		1.91	q
8	Morgan Lake	Great Britain	–	o	o	xxo		1.91	q
9	Solène Gicquel	France	o	o	o	xxx		1.87	
10	Marija Vuković	Montenegro	–	o	xo	xxx		1.87	
11	Nawal Meniker	France	o	xo	xo	xxx		1.87	
12	Karmen Bruus	Estonia	o	o	xxo	xxx		1.87	SB
13	Lia Apostolovski	Slovenia	o	o	xxx			1.82	
13	Heta Tuuri	Finland	o	o	xxx			1.82	
15	Urtė Baikštytė	Lithuania	o	xo	xxx			1.82	
15	Elena Vallortigara	Italy	o	xo	xxx			1.82	
	Sini Lällä	Finland						DNS	

=== Final ===
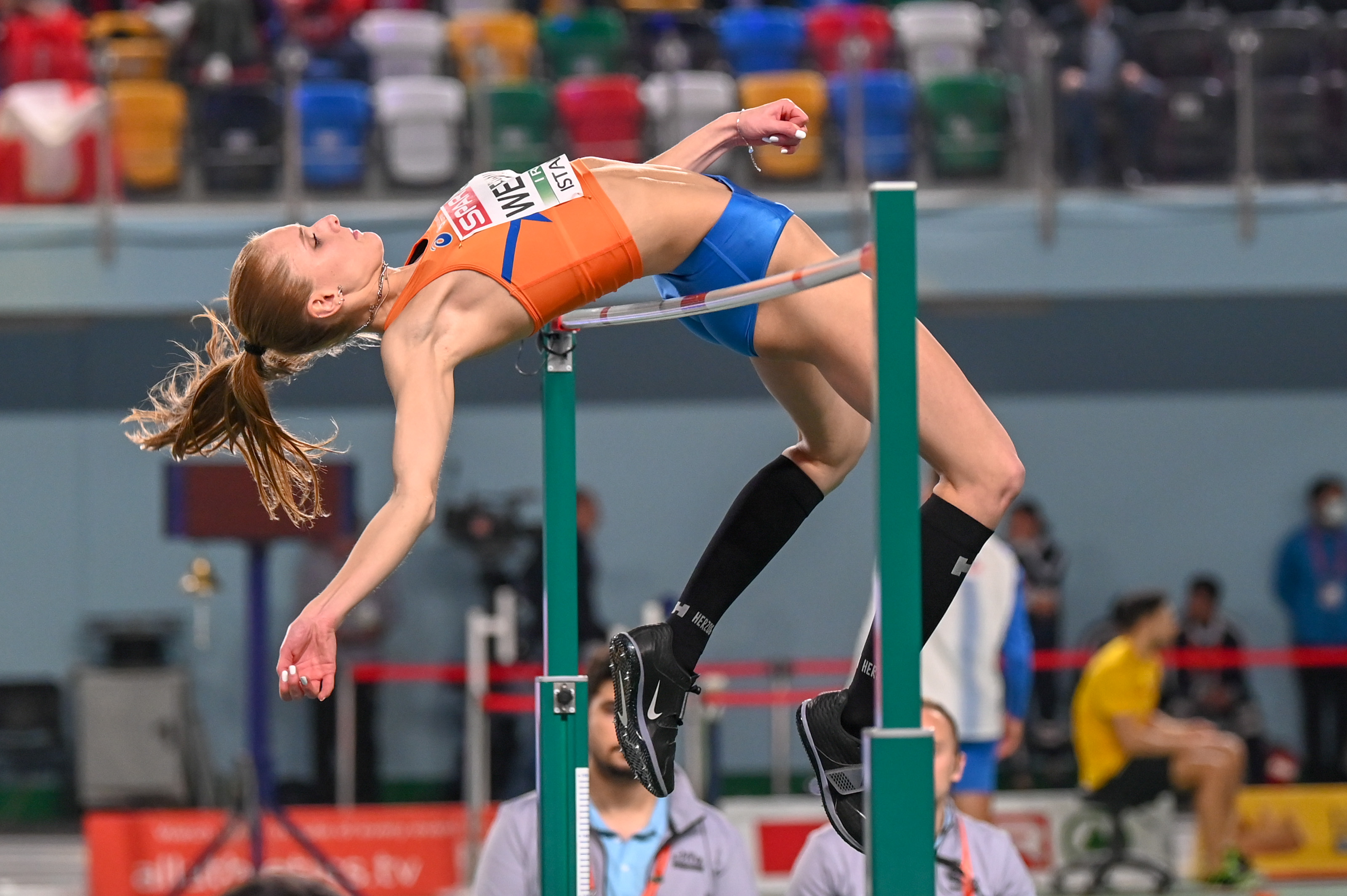
Silver medalist Britt Weerman of the Netherlands in the final

Rank	Athlete	Nationality	1.80	1.86	1.91	1.94	1.96	1.98	2.03	Result	Note
1st place, gold medalist(s)	Yaroslava Mahuchikh	Ukraine	–	–	o	o	o	o	xxx	1.98	
2nd place, silver medalist(s)	Britt Weerman	Netherlands	o	o	o	o	o	xxx		1.96	=NR
3rd place, bronze medalist(s)	Kateryna Tabashnyk	Ukraine	o	o	xo	o	xxx			1.94	
4	Angelina Topić	Serbia	o	xo	xo	o	xxx			1.94	=NR WU20L
5	Yuliia Levchenko	Ukraine	o	o	o	xxo	xxx			1.94	
6	Christina Honsel	Germany	o	o	o	xxx				1.91	
7	Morgan Lake	Great Britain	–	o	xxx					1.86	
7	Daniela Stanciu	Romania	o	o	xxx					1.86	
