= 2022 World Athletics U20 Championships – Men's decathlon =

Men's decathlon at the 2022 World Athletics U20 Championships
- Venue: Estadio Olímpico Pascual Guerrero
- Dates: 1–2 August
- Competitors: 27 from 20 nations
- Winning points: 7860

Medalists
| gold medal | Gabriel Emmanuel | Netherlands |
| silver medal | Jacob Thelander | Sweden |
| bronze medal | Elliot Duvert | Sweden |

The men's decathlon at the 2022 World Athletics U20 Championships was held at the Estadio Olímpico Pascual Guerrero on 1 and 2 August.

== Records ==
U20 standing records prior to the 2022 World Athletics U20 Championships were as follows:

| Record | Athlete & Nationality | Mark | Location | Date |
|---|---|---|---|---|
| World U20 Record | Niklas Kaul (GER) | 8435 | Grosseto, Italy | 23 July 2017 |
| Championship Record | Ashley Moloney (AUS) | 8190 | Tampere, Finland | 11 July 2018 |
| World U20 Leading | Jacob Thelander (SWE) | 7823 | Ljungby, Sweden | 22 May 2022 |

== Results ==
The highest mark recorded in each event is highlighted in yellow

| Rank | Athlete | Nationality | 100m | LJ | SP | HJ | 400m | 110m H | DT | PV | JT | 1500m | Points | Notes |
|---|---|---|---|---|---|---|---|---|---|---|---|---|---|---|
| 1st place, gold medalist(s) | Gabriel Emmanuel | Netherlands | 10.68 PB | 7.30 PB | 15.09 | 2.02 | 49.46 PB | 13.83 PB | 47.46 | 3.70 | 54.89 | 4:57.72 SB | 7860 | WU20L |
| 2nd place, silver medalist(s) | Jacob Thelander | Sweden | 10.90 PB | 7.53 PB | 12.53 | 2.08 | 49.24 SB | 14.83 | 40.89 | 4.40 PB | 57.02 | 4:52.92 | 7770 | |
| 3rd place, bronze medalist(s) | Elliot Duvert | Sweden | 11.34 PB | 7.25 PB | 13.94 PB | 1.99 | 51.05 PB | 14.34 PB | 40.81 | 4.90 PB | 49.97 PB | 4:53.71 | 7622 | PB |
| 4 | Abraham Sandvin Vogelsang | Norway | 11.25 PB | 7.23 SB | 12.51 | 1.99 | 51.41 SB | 14.20 PB | 44.19 PB | 4.60 SB | 52.94 SB | 4:55.05 | 7567 | PB |
| 5 | Josmi Sánchez | Cuba | 11.44 | 7.07 PB | 13.32 SB | 1.96 PB | 51.01 SB | 14.57 PB | 40.17 | 4.80 PB | 52.20 | 4:41.84 | 7527 | PB |
| 6 | Pierre Blaecke | France | 11.26 PB | 7.12 PB | 13.49 SB | 1.87 | 50.44 | 14.81 | 35.36 | 4.70 | 55.30 PB | 4:26.71 | 7520 | |
| 7 | Matthias Lasch | Austria | 11.10 PB | 6.90 | 13.43 | 1.87 PB | 51.28 | 15.21 | 41.32 PB | 4.50 PB | 67.66 PB | 4:49.52 SB | 7516 | PB |
| 8 | Jan Duhovnik | Slovenia | 10.91 PB | 7.34 PB | 13.55 | 1.87 | 49.39 PB | 14.71 PB | 46.89 | 3.90 PB | 54.58 PB | 5:02.52 PB | 7491 | PB |
| 9 | Sacha Rifflart | France | 11.12 PB | 6.85 | 14.81 | 1.84 | 49.94 PB | 14.11 | 40.15 | 4.30 | 50.38 SB | 4:42.43 | 7457 | |
| 10 | Yoram Vriezen | Netherlands | 11.03 | 6.82 SB | 13.71 PB | 1.84 | 49.09 | 14.15 | 37.89 | 4.20 | 47.06 | 4:28.42 PB | 7404 | |
| 11 | Andrin Huber | Switzerland | 11.31 | 6.81 PB | 14.40 PB | 1.90 | 50.10 PB | 14.77 PB | 36.91 | 4.20 | 57.92 PB | 4:36.97 | 7398 | |
| 12 | Nate Paris | Canada | 10.56 | 7.11 PB | 11.72 | 2.05 SB | 48.08 PB | 14.80 PB | 35.58 PB | 3.90 | 46.47 PB | 4:55.12 PB | 7309 | PB |
| 13 | Michal Jára | Czech Republic | 11.04 | 7.10 | 11.62 | 1.90 PB | 50.22 | 14.95 | 38.47 | 4.40 | 50.23 | 4:46.46 | 7244 | |
| 14 | Sebastian Monneret | Denmark | 11.10 PB | 6.75 PB | 13.47 | 1.75 | 48.84 PB | 15.30 | 35.63 | 4.30 | 45.02 | 4:26.12 PB | 7120 | |
| 15 | Alberto Nonino | Italy | 11.21 PB | 7.06 | 11.70 | 1.87 | 51.57 | 14.34 | 35.04 | 4.60 PB | 42.12 | 4:47.23 | 7054 | |
| 16 | Zsombor Gálpál | Hungary | 11.35 | 6.24 | 15.60 | 1.78 | 51.74 PB | 14.88 | 37.48 | 4.30 | 52.63 | 4:47.69 PB | 7037 | |
| 17 | Pol Ferrer | Spain | 10.76 PB | 6.97 | 13.46 | 1.93 | 49.32 | 14.68 PB | 42.05 PB | NM | 45.16 | 4:37.95 | 6808 | |
| 18 | Joonas Lapinkero | Finland | 11.23 PB | 6.16 | 12.65 | 1.78 | 49.58 PB | 14.51 | 36.18 | 3.90 | 46.25 | 4:51.36 | 6751 | |
| 19 | Lars Mäsing | Switzerland | 11.40 | 6.58 | 11.88 | 1.78 | 51.21 SB | 14.69 PB | 41.45 | 4.00 | 40.46 | 4:47.20 | 6742 | |
| 20 | Elie Bacari | Belgium | 10.69 PB | 7.01 PB | 12.48 | 1.96 PB | 50.67 SB | 13.96 PB | 36.61 SB | 3.60 | 48.47 | DNF | 6585 | |
| 21 | Petr Svoboda | Czech Republic | 10.98 | 7.03 | 11.50 | 1.81 | 49.80 | 14.34 | 38.61 PB | NM | 39.15 | 4:31.52 PB | 6454 | |
| | Sammy Ball | Great Britain | 10.90 PB | 6.71 | 14.55 | 1.96 | 48.43 PB | 15.21 | 39.97 | 3.70 | DNS | | DNF | |
| | Tyrel Prenz | Germany | 11.14 PB | 6.78 PB | 12.05 | 1.78 | 48.31 SB | 14.82 | 35.91 | NM | DNS | | DNF | |
| | Samuel Werner | Germany | 11.30 | 6.82 | 13.12 | 1.81 | 49.61 | DNS | | | | | DNF | |
| | Andreas Hantson | Estonia | 11.83 | 6.84 | 12.20 | 1.96 | 54.31 | DNS | | | | | DNF | |
| | Samandar Makhmudov | Uzbekistan | 11.66 | 7.01 | 12.60 | 1.87 | DNS | | | | | | DNF | |
| | Thomas van der Poel | Belgium | 11.11 PB | 7.22 | 12.43 | DNS | | | | | | | DNF | |
