= 2022 World Athletics U20 Championships – Women's heptathlon =

Women's heptathlon at the 2022 World Athletics U20 Championships
- Venue: Estadio Olímpico Pascual Guerrero
- Dates: 3–4 August
- Competitors: 24 from 17 nations
- Winning points: 6084

Medalists
gold medal	Saga Vanninen	Finland
silver medal	Serina Riedel	Germany
bronze medal	Sandrina Sprengel	Germany

The women's heptathlon at the 2022 World Athletics U20 Championships was held at the Estadio Olímpico Pascual Guerrero on 3 and 4 August.

27 athletes from 18 countries were entered to the competition.

== Records ==
U20 standing records prior to the 2022 World Athletics U20 Championships were as follows:

Record	Athlete & Nationality	Result	Location	Date
World U20 Record	Carolina Klüft (SWE)	6542	Munich, Germany	10 August 2002
Championship Record	Carolina Klüft (SWE)	6470	Kingston, Jamaica	20 July 2002
World U20 Leading	Saga Vanninen (FIN)	6193	Oulu, Finland	26 June 2022

== Results ==
The highest mark recorded in each event is highlighted in yellow

Rank	Athlete	Nationality	100m H	HJ	SP	200m	LJ	JT	800m	Points	Notes
1st place, gold medalist(s)	Saga Vanninen	Finland	13.52 PB	1.72	14.18	24.49 PB	6.24	46.21	2:28.91	6084	
2nd place, silver medalist(s)	Serina Riedel	Germany	13.97	1.75 SB	11.96	24.56 PB	6.30 SB	41.47 PB	2:25.56	5874	
3rd place, bronze medalist(s)	Sandrina Sprengel	Germany	13.94 PB	1.81 PB	12.07	24.35 SB	6.03	42.33	2:30.82	5845	
4	Liisa-Maria Lusti	Estonia	13.95	1.78	11.08 PB	24.24	6.24	35.35	2:26.82	5731	
5	Gerda Kerija Dreimane	Latvia	14.20 PB	1.75 PB	12.09	25.31 PB	6.22	40.62	2:26.91	5721	PB
6	Ella Rush	Great Britain	14.33 PB	1.69	12.03	24.52 PB	5.93	34.61 PB	2:19.43	5591	PB
7	Luna Goureau	France	13.39 PB	1.63 SB	13.35 PB	23.91 PB	5.42	37.11 PB	2:34.98	5498	PB
8	Sennah Vanhoeijen	Belgium	14.38	1.75 PB	11.50 PB	25.12	5.98	36.36 PB	2:36.37	5401	
9	Stefani Beatriz Navarro Da Silva	Brazil	14.39	1.54 PB	12.91 PB	26.32 PB	5.94 PB	48.06	2:32.73	5393	PB
10	Laura van den Brande	Belgium	14.54	1.66	11.47	25.83	5.67 PB	37.50 PB	2:21.87 PB	5314	
11	Marina Zanoni	Switzerland	14.12	1.75 PB	10.94	25.01	5.72	34.07 SB	2:37.39	5276	
12	Anastasia Ntragkomirova	Greece	15.28	1.69 SB	13.84	26.66 SB	5.98 SB	44.76	2:46.53	5272	
13	Sofia Cosculluela	Spain	13.74 PB	1.57	11.91	24.38 PB	4.69	40.53 PB	2:22.80 PB	5256	
14	Anja Dlauhy	Austria	14.53	1.72	9.46	25.50	5.65	36.03 SB	2:21.82	5253	
15	Sophie Kreiner	Austria	14.68 SB	1.63	12.71	25.16 SB	5.43 SB	39.89 PB	2:33.73	5227	
16	Linda Bichsel	Switzerland	13.95	1.63	10.57	24.49	5.49	27.93	2:20.12	5213	
17	JaiCieonna Gero-Holt	United States	14.76	1.84 PB	11.87	25.84	5.42	35.76	2:39.22	5212	
18	Bryanna Craig	United States	14.65	1.72	9.19	25.72	5.55	36.12 PB	2:20.41	5192	
19	Natálie Olivová	Czech Republic	15.05	1.69	11.60	26.50	5.18	35.90	2:24.10	5033	
20	Mokhigul Arzieva	Uzbekistan	14.96	1.69	11.27	27.12	5.46	41.32	2:38.77 SB	4972	
	Eloise Hind	Great Britain	14.08 PB	1.78 =PB	10.14	25.60 PB	DNS	–	–	DNF	
	Ana Luisa Couto Soares	Brazil	14.51	1.57	11.79	DNS	–	–	–	DNF	
	Paulina Kubis	Poland	14.32 PB	1.54	DNS	–	–	–	–	DNF	
	Anisiya Lochman	Ukraine	17.37	DNS	–	–	–	–	–	DNF	
