= Tarik Robinson-O'Hagan =

American athlete

Personal information
- Nationality: United States
- Born: November 25, 2003 (age 22)

Sport
- Sport: Athletics
- Event(s): Shot put, hammer

Achievements and titles
- Personal best(s): SP: 21.11 m (2025); HT: 76.78 m (2025); DT: 52.48 m (2023)
Medal record
Men's athletics
Representing USA
World U20 Championships
Gold medal – first place	2022 Cali	Shot put

Tarik Robinson-O'Hagan is an American track and field athlete. He won the gold medal at the 2022 IAAF World Junior Championships in the shot put.

== Personal life ==
Robinson-O'Hagan was born in Woonsocket, Rhode Island. He attended Woonsocket High School and was a two-time Rhode Island State Champion in track and field. In 2021, he committed to the University of Mississippi after being impressed by the Ole Miss campus, team, and coaches.

== Career ==
In June 2022, Robinson-O'Hagan won the New Balance Nationals Outdoor title in the shot put, discus, and the hammer at Franklin Field in Philadelphia. Later that week, he won both the shot put and hammer throw (with a new PB) at the USA Track and Field under-20 national championships in Eugene, Oregon.

In August 2022, he won the gold medal in the shot put at the World Athletics U20 Championships. He also reached the final in the hammer and finished in eighth place.

In March 2024, he won the shot put competition at the NCAA Indoor Championships in Boston, Massachusetts.

O’Hagan threw a personal best of 76.78m to finish third at 2025 NCAA Division I Outdoor Track and Field Championships in Eugene, Oregon. He placed sixth with a hammer throw of 76.54 metres at the 2025 2025 USA Track and Field Championships.

In February 2026, he won his tenth SEC title with victory in the men's weight throw with 23.25m at the SEC Indoor Championships. On 14 March, he won his third consecutive shot out title at the 2026 NCAA Indoor Championships. In May, O’Hagan won his 12th and 13th SEC titles, recording 20.80 metres to win the men’s shot put having also previously won the hammer throw with a 72.69 m.

== Personal bests ==
Information from World Athletics profile unless otherwise noted.

As of June 23, 2025

Event	Performance	Location	Date
Shot put	21.11 m (69 ft 3 in)	Nashville	February 15, 2025
Hammer throw	76.78 m (251 ft 10 3/4 in)	Eugene	June 11, 2025
Discus throw	52.48 m (172 ft 2 in)	University, Mississippi	March 25, 2023
