= Owen Merrett =

English hammer thrower

Personal information
- Born: 16 July 2004 (age 21)
- Education: Loughborough University

Sport
- Country: Great Britain
- Sport: Athletics
- Event: Hammer throw
- Club: Harrow Athletic Club / Loughborough Students Athletics Club
- Coached by: Matt Spicer

Achievements and titles
- Personal best: Hammer throw (7.26kg): 63.40 m (2023)

Owen Merrett (born 16 July 2004) is an English hammer thrower who competes for Harrow Athletic Club and Loughborough University.

He has won multiple age-group medals at national level, including the England Athletics U20 and U23 Championships. Merrett is coached by Matt Spicer and is a student-athlete at Loughborough University.

== Career highlights ==
- England Athletics U23 Championships – Bronze medallist in hammer throw (2023)
- BUCS Outdoor Championships – Finalist in men's hammer throw (2023)
- England Athletics U20 Championships – Gold medallist in hammer throw (2022)

== Personal best ==
- Hammer throw (7.26 kg): 63.40 m – Loughborough (2023)
