= Ioannis Korakidis =

Greek athlete (born 2003)

Personal information
- Nationality: Greek
- Born: 23 June 2003 (age 23)
- Height: 1.84
- Weight: 101

Sport
- Sport: Athletics
- Event: Hammer-Throw

Achievements and titles
- Personal best(s): Hammer: 76,14(2026); Discus: 46.39m (2024)
Medal record
Men's athletics
Representing Greece
European U23 Championships
Bronze medal – third place	2025 Bergen	Hammer throw
World U20 Championships
Gold medal – first place	2022 Cali	Hammer throw

Ioannis Korakidis (born 23 June 2003) is a Greek track and field athlete who competes in the hammer throw and discus. He was World U20 Champion in the hammer throw in 2022.

== Early life ==
From Pedino, Kilkis, Greece, he started at the University of Tennessee in 2018.

== Career ==
He won the Men's hammer throw at the 2022 World Athletics U20 Championships held in Cali, Colombia. The following season he was selected for the European Athletics U23 Championships in Espoo in the hammer, but did not reach the final.

He finished fifth in the senior Greek national championships in June 2024. He threw a lifetime best 75.08 metres in 2024.

He competed at the European Throwing Cup in March 2025 in Nicosia, placing third in the U23 hammer competition. In July 2025, he won the bronze medal at the 2025 European Athletics U23 Championships in Bergen, Norway with a throw of 72.51 metres.
