= Karmen Bruus =

Estonian high jumper (born 2005)

Personal information
- Born: 24 January 2005 (age 21) Estonia

Sport
- Country: Estonia
- Sport: Athletics
- Event: High jump
- Club: Tartu Spordiselts Kalev
- Coached by: Gaspar Epro

Achievements and titles
- Personal bests: 1.96 m (6 ft 5 in) =WU18B =NR (2022); Indoors; 1.91 m (6 ft 3 in) NU20R (2022)
Medal record
Women's athletics
Representing Estonia
World U20 Championships
Gold medal – first place	2022 Cali	High jump
Bronze medal – third place	2024 Lima	High jump

Karmen Bruus (born 24 January 2005) is an Estonian athlete who competes in the high jump. At the age of 17, she won the gold medal at the 2022 World Athletics Under-20 Championships. Her personal best result for high jump (1.96 m) is the Estonian record and world U18 best.

== Statistics ==
=== International competitions ===
Representing Estonia
Year	Competition	Venue	Position	Result	Notes
2022	European U18 Championships	Jerusalem, Israel	7th	1.75 m	
2022	World Championships	Eugene, OR, United States	7th	1.96 m	=WU18B =NR
2022	World U20 Championships	Cali, Colombia	1st	1.95 m	
2022	European Championships	Munich, Germany	15th (q)	1.83 m	
2023	European Indoor Championships	Istanbul, Turkey	12th (q)	1.87 m i	SB
2024	World U20 Championships	Lima, Peru	3rd	1.89 m	
2025	World University Games	Bochum, Germany	11th	1.76 m	
2026	European Championships	Birmingham, United Kingdom	13th	1.83 m	

=== Personal bests ===
Event	Performance	Location	Date	Note
High jump	1.96 m	Eugene, OR, United States	19 July 2022	=WU18B =NR
High jump indoor	1.91 m	Valmiera, Latvia	5 March 2022	NU18R NU20R

=== Seasonal bests by year ===
View chart definition.
- 2019 – 1.73
- 2020 – 1.74
- 2021 – 1.80
- 2022 – 1.96

Awards
Preceded by Eneli Jefimova	Estonian Young Athlete of the Year; 2022	Succeeded by Incumbent
