= 2022 World Athletics U20 Championships =

Championships for athletes under 20

- Host city: Cali, Colombia
- Nations: 145
- Athletes: 1533
- Events: 45
- Dates: 1–6 August 2022
- Main venue: Estadio Olímpico Pascual Guerrero
- Website: worldathletics.org

The 2022 World Athletics U20 Championships, also known colloquially by its former official title, the World Junior Championships, was an international athletics competition for athletes qualifying as juniors (born no earlier than 1 January 2003), which was held from 1 to 6 August 2022 at the Estadio Olímpico Pascual Guerrero in Cali, Colombia. Cali previously hosted the 2015 World Youth Championships in Athletics.

== Sports venues ==
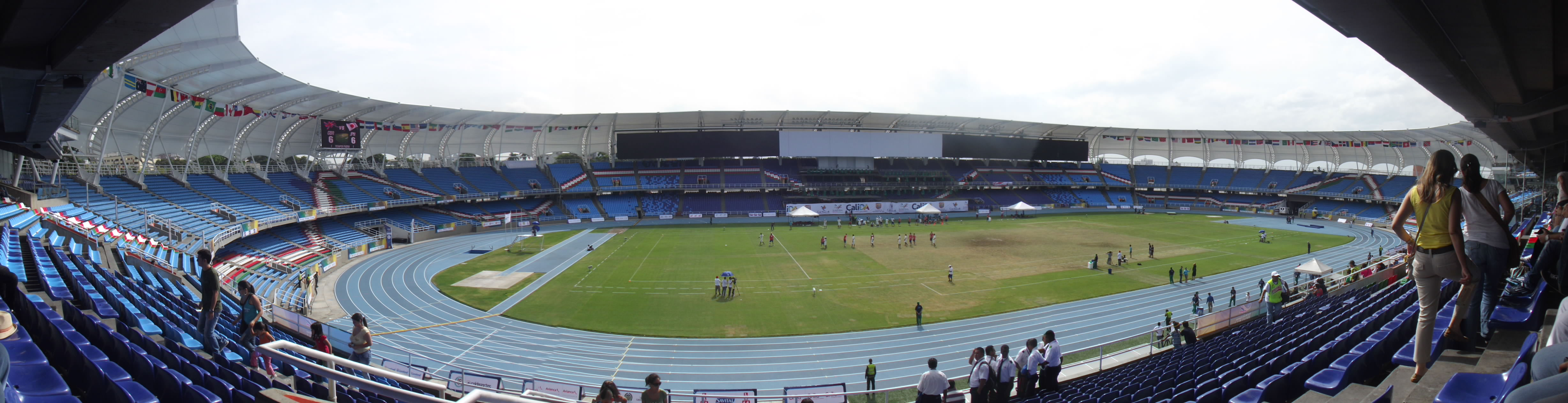
Pascual Guerrero Stadium in 2013

The main venue for the competitions was the Pascual Guerrero Olympic Stadium with capacity for 35,405 spectators, while the Pedro Grajales Athletics Stadium was used for training sessions.

== Schedule ==
| Q | Qualification | H | Heats | S | Semifinals | F | Final |
M = morning session, A = afternoon session

All dates are COT (UTC−5)

Men
| Date → | 1 Aug | | 2 Aug | | | 3 Aug | | 4 Aug | | 5 Aug | | 6 Aug |
| Event ↓ | M | A | M | A | | M | A | M | A | M | A | A |
|---|---|---|---|---|---|---|---|---|---|---|---|---|
| 100 m | H | | | S | F | | | | | | | |
| 200 m | | | | | | H | S | | F | | | |
| 400 m | | | H | | | | S | | F | | | |
| 800 m | | | | | | | | H | | | S | F |
| 1500 m | H | | | | | | F | | | | | |
| 3000 m | | | | | | H | | | | | F | |
| 5000 m | | F | | | | | | | | | | |
| 3000 m SC | | | | | | H | | | | | | F |
| 110 m hurdles | | H | | S | | | F | | | | | |
| 400 m hurdles | | | | | | H | | | S | | F | |
| Decathlon | F | | | | | | | | | | | |
| High jump | | | Q | | | | | | | | F | |
| Pole vault | | | Q | | | | | | F | | | |
| Long jump | Q | | | F | | | | | | | | |
| Triple jump | | | | | | | | Q | | | F | |
| Shot put | | Q | | F | | | | | | | | |
| Discus throw | | | | | | | | | | Q | | F |
| Hammer throw | | | Q | | | | | | F | | | |
| Javelin throw | | | | | | | | Q | | | F | |
| 10,000 m walk | | | | | | | | | | F | | |
| 4 × 100 m relay | | | | | | | | | H | | F | |
| 4 × 400 m relay | | | | | | | | | | H | | F |

Women
| Date → | 1 Aug | | 2 Aug | | 3 Aug | | | 4 Aug | | 5 Aug | | 6 Aug |
| Event ↓ | M | A | M | A | M | A | | M | A | M | A | A |
|---|---|---|---|---|---|---|---|---|---|---|---|---|
| 100 m | | | H | | | S | F | | | | | |
| 200 m | | | | | | | | H | S | | F | |
| 400 m | | | H | | | S | | | F | | | |
| 800 m | H | | | S | | F | | | | | | |
| 1500 m | | | | | | | | H | | | | F |
| 3000 m | | F | | | | | | | | | | |
| 5000 m | | | | | | | | | | | | F |
| 3000 m SC | H | | | | | | | | F | | | |
| 100 m hurdles | | | | | | | | H | | | S | F |
| 400 m hurdles | | | H | | | S | | | F | | | |
| Heptathlon | | | | | F | | | | | | | |
| High jump | | | | | | | | | Q | | | F |
| Pole vault | | Q | | | | | | F | | | | |
| Long jump | | | | | Q | | | | | | F | |
| Triple jump | | | | | | | | | | Q | | F |
| Shot put | Q | | | F | | | | | | | | |
| Discus throw | | Q | | | | F | | | | | | |
| Hammer throw | | | | | Q | | | | | | F | |
| Javelin throw | Q | | | F | | | | | | | | |
| 10,000 m walk | | | | | | | | | | F | | |
| 4 × 100 m relay | | | | | | | | | H | | F | |
| 4 × 400 m relay | | | | | | | | | | H | | F |

Mixed
| Date → | 1 Aug | | 2 Aug | | 3 Aug | | 4 Aug | | 5 Aug | | 6 Aug |
| Event ↓ | M | A | M | A | M | A | M | A | M | A | A |
|---|---|---|---|---|---|---|---|---|---|---|---|
| 4 × 400 m relay | | H | | F | | | | | | | |

== Qualifying Standards ==
Qualification period lasted from 1 October 2021 to 18 July 2022.

| Event | Men | Women |
|---|---|---|
| 100 metres | 10.60 | 11.90 |
| 200 metres | 21.40 | 24.40 |
| 400 metres | 47.60 | 55.20 |
| 800 metres | 1:51.00 | 2:09.00 |
| 1500 metres | 3:48.50 | 4:29.00 |
| 3000 metres | 8:15.00 | 9:32.00 |
| 5000 metres | 14:15.00 | 16:40.00 |
| 3000 metres steeplechase | 9:08.00 | 10:36.00 |
| 110/100 metres hurdles | 14.20 | 14.20 |
| 400 metres hurdles | 53.20 | 1:01.00 |
| 10,000 metres race walk | 43:50.00 | 50:40.00 |
| High jump | 2.15 | 1.81 |
| Pole vault | 5.05 | 4.05 |
| Long jump | 7.55 | 6.12 |
| Triple jump | 15.55 | 12.85 |
| Shot put | 18.20 (6 kg) | 14.50 (4 kg) |
| Discus throw | 56.50 | 48.50 |
| Hammer throw | 68.30 (6 kg) | 57.50 |
| Javelin throw | 69.00 | 50.00 |
| Decathlon/Heptathlon | 7050 points | 5300 points |
| 4 × 100 metres relay | No standard | No standard |
| 4 × 400 metres relay | No standard | No standard |
| 4 × 400 metres relay mixed | No standard | No standard |

== Men's results ==
=== Track events ===
| Event | Gold | | Silver | | Bronze | |
|---|---|---|---|---|---|---|
| 100 metres | Letsile Tebogo; Botswana | 9.91 WU20R | Bouwahjgie Nkrumie; Jamaica | 10.02 NU20R | Benjamin Richardson; South Africa | 10.12 |
| 200 metres | Blessing Afrifah; Israel | 19.96 [.954] CR, AU20R | Letsile Tebogo; Botswana | 19.96 [.960] CR, AU20R | Calab Law; Australia | 20.48 |
| 400 metres | Lythe Pillay; South Africa | 45.28 PB | Steven McElroy; United States | 45.65 PB | Yusuf Ali Abbas; Bahrain | 45.80 |
| 800 metres | Ermias Girma; Ethiopia | 1:47.36 | Heithem Chenitef; Algeria | 1:47.61 PB | Ethan Hussey; Great Britain | 1:47.65 |
| 1500 metres | Reynold Cheruiyot; Kenya | 3:35.83 | Ermias Girma; Ethiopia | 3:37.24 | Daniel Kimaiyo; Kenya | 3:37.43 |
| 3000 metres | Melkeneh Azize; Ethiopia | 7:44.06 | Felix Korir; Kenya | 7:47.86 PB | Edwin Kisalsak; Kenya | 7:49.82 PB |
| 5000 metres | Addisu Yihune; Ethiopia | 14:03.05 | Merhawi Mebrahtu; Eritrea | 14:03.33 | Habtom Samuel; Eritrea | 14:03.67 |
| 110 metres hurdles | Antoine Andrews; Bahamas | 13.23 WU20L | Malik Mixon; United States | 13.27 PB | Matthew Sophia; Netherlands | 13.34 NU20R |
| 400 metres hurdles | İsmail Nezir; Turkey | 48.84 NU20R | Matic Ian Guček; Slovenia | 48.91 NU20R | Roshawn Clarke; Jamaica | 49.62 |
| 3000 metres steeplechase | Samuel Duguna; Ethiopia | 8:37.92 | Samuel Firewu; Ethiopia | 8:39.11 | Salaheddine Ben Yazide; Morocco | 8:40.62 |
| 4 × 100 metres relay | Japan; Kowa Ikeshita; Hiroto Fujiwara; Shunki Tateno; Hiroki Yanagita | 39.35 | Jamaica; Bouwahjgie Nkrumie; Bryan Levell; Mark-Anthony Daley; Adrian Kerr; David Lynch* | 39.35 | United States; Laurenz Colbert; Michael Gizzi; Brandon Miller; Johnny Brackins; David Foster*; Charlie Bartholomew* | 39.57 SB |
| 4 × 400 metres relay | United States; Steven McElroy; Ashton Schwartzman; Charlie Bartholomew; Will Sumner; Kody Blackwood*; Grant Williams* | 3:04.47 SB | Jamaica; Shemar Palmer; Shaemar Uter; Jasauna Dennis; Delano Kennedy; Derrick Grant*; Malachi Johnson* | 3:05.72 SB | Canada; Christopher Morales-Williams; Ben Tilson; Daniel Kidd; Tyler Floyd; Riley Flemington* | 3:06.50 NU20R |
| 10,000 m walk | Mazlum Demir; Turkey | 42:36.02 | Ismail Benhammouda; Algeria | 42:42.49 | Hayrettin Yıldız; Turkey | 43:07.95 |

=== Field events ===
| Event | Gold | | Silver | | Bronze | |
|---|---|---|---|---|---|---|
| High jump | Brandon Pottinger; Jamaica | 2.14 m =PB | Brian Raats; South Africa | 2.10 m | Not awarded | |
| High jump | Brandon Pottinger; Jamaica | 2.14 m =PB | Bozhidar Sarâboyukov; Bulgaria | 2.10 m | Not awarded | |
| Pole vault | Anthony Ammirati; France | 5.75 m WU20L, PB | Juho Alasaari; Finland | 5.60 m =NU20R | Michał Gawenda; Poland | 5.45 m PB |
| Long jump | Erwan Konaté; France | 8.08 m WU20L | Alejandro Parada; Cuba | 7.91 m | Gabriel Luiz Boza; Brazil | 7.90 m =SB |
| Triple jump | Jaydon Hibbert; Jamaica | 17.27 m CR, PB | Selva Prabhu; India | 16.15 m PB | Viktor Morozov; Estonia | 16.13 m PB |
| Shot put (6 kg) | Tarik Robinson-O'Hagan; United States | 20.73 m PB | Kobe Lawrence; Jamaica | 20.58 m PB | Tizian Lauria; Germany | 20.55 m |
| Discus throw (1.750 kg) | Marius Karges; Germany | 65.55 m | Miká Sosna; Germany | 63.88 m | Mykhailo Brudin; Ukraine | 63.30 m PB |
| Hammer throw (6 kg) | Ioannis Korakidis; Greece | 79.11 m WU20L | Max Lampinen; Finland | 76.33 m PB | Iosif Kesidis; Cyprus | 76.32 m PB |
| Javelin throw | Artur Felfner; Ukraine | 79.36 m | Max Dehning; Germany | 77.24 m | Keyshawn Strachan; Bahamas | 72.95 m |

=== Combined events ===
| Event | Gold | | Silver | | Bronze | |
|---|---|---|---|---|---|---|
| Decathlon | Gabriel Emmanuel; Netherlands | 7860 pts WU20L | Jacob Thelander; Sweden | 7770 pts | Elliot Duvert; Sweden | 7622 pts PB |

== Women's results ==
=== Track events ===
| Event | Gold | | Silver | | Bronze | |
|---|---|---|---|---|---|---|
| 100 metres | Tina Clayton; Jamaica | 10.95 CR | Serena Cole; Jamaica | 11.14 | Shawnti Jackson; United States | 11.15 PB |
| 100 metres | Tina Clayton; Jamaica | 10.95 CR | Serena Cole; Jamaica | 11.14 | N'Ketia Seedo; Netherlands | 11.15 NU20R |
| 200 metres | Brianna Lyston; Jamaica | 22.65 | Jayla Jamison; United States | 22.77 PB | Alana Reid; Jamaica | 22.95 PB |
| 400 metres | Yemi Mary John; Great Britain | 51.50 PB | Damaris Mutunga; Kenya | 51.71 NU20R | Rupal; India | 51.85 PB |
| 800 metres | Roisin Willis; United States | 1:59.13 CR | Audrey Werro; Switzerland | 1:59.53 NU20R | Juliette Whittaker; United States | 2:00.18 |
| 1500 metres | Brenda Chebet; Kenya | 4:04.64 CR, PB | Purity Chepkirui; Kenya | 4:07.64 PB | Mebriht Mekonen; Ethiopia | 4:08.39 |
| 3000 metres | Betty Chelangat; Kenya | 9:01.03 | Tsiyon Abebe; Ethiopia | 9:03.85 | Nancy Cherop; Kenya | 9:05.98 |
| 5000 metres | Prisca Chesang; Uganda | 15:31.17 | Agate Caune; Latvia | 15:43.56 | Maria Forero; Spain | 16:26.39 |
| 100 metres hurdles | Kerrica Hill; Jamaica | 12.77 CR, WU18B | Alexis James; Jamaica | 12.87 PB | Anna Tóth; Hungary | 13.00 NU20R |
| 400 metres hurdles | Akala Garrett; United States | 56.16 WU20L | Hanna Karlsson; Sweden | 56.71 PB | Michaela Rose; United States | 56.86 PB |
| 3000 metres steeplechase | Faith Cherotich; Kenya | 9:16.14 | Sembo Almayew; Ethiopia | 9:30.41 | Meseret Yeshaneh; Ethiopia | 9:42.02 |
| 4 × 100 metres relay | Jamaica; Serena Cole; Tina Clayton; Kerrica Hill; Tia Clayton; Alexis James* | 42.59 WU20R | United States; Jayla Jamison; Autumn Wilson; Iyana Gray; Shawnti Jackson; Lily Jones*; Alyssa Colbert* | 43.28 NU20R | Colombia; María Alejandra Murillo; Marlet Ospino; Melany Bolaño; Laura Martínez | 44.59 |
| 4 × 400 metres relay | United States; Makenze Kelley; Shawnti Jackson; Akala Garrett; Roisin Willis; Madison Whyte*; Zaya Akins*; Kennedy Wade* | 3:28.06 SB | Jamaica; Dejanea Oakley; Abigail Campbell; Oneika McAnnuff; Alliah Baker; Rickiana Russell*; Oneika Brissett* | 3:31.59 SB | Great Britain; Yemi Mary John; Jessica Astill; Ophelia Pye; Etty Sisson; Poppy Malik* | 3:31.86 SB |
| 10,000 m walk | Karla Serrano; Mexico | 46:24.35 PB | Ai Ooyama; Japan | 46:24.44 | Ayane Yanai; Japan | 46:43.07 |

* – Indicates the athlete competed in preliminary heats but not the final.

=== Field events ===
| Event | Gold | | Silver | | Bronze | |
|---|---|---|---|---|---|---|
| High jump | Karmen Bruus; Estonia | 1.95 m | Britt Weerman; Netherlands | 1.93 m NU20R | Angelina Topić; Serbia | 1.93 m |
| Pole vault | Hana Moll; United States | 4.35 m | Chiara Sistermann; Germany | 4.30 m =PB | Janne Sophie Ohrt; Germany | 4.30 m PB |
| Long jump | Plamena Mitkova; Bulgaria | 6.66 m PB | Natalia Linares; Colombia | 6.59 m | Marta Amani; Italy | 6.52 m PB |
| Triple jump | Sharifa Davronova; Uzbekistan | 14.04 m WU20L | Sohane Aucargos; France | 13.38 m | Tiana Boras; Australia | 13.30 m PB |
| Shot put | Miné de Klerk; South Africa | 17.17 m | Pınar Akyol; Turkey | 16.84 m | Zuzanna Maślana; Poland | 16.06 m PB |
| Discus throw | Emma Sralla; Sweden | 56.15 m | Despoina Filippidou; Greece | 54.48 m | Miné de Klerk; South Africa | 53.54 m NU20R |
| Hammer throw | Rachele Mori; Italy | 67.21 m | Paola Bueno; Mexico | 62.74 m | Raika Murakami; Japan | 61.45 m SB |
| Javelin throw | Adriana Vilagoš; Serbia | 63.52 m CR, AU20R | Valentina Barrios; Colombia | 57.84 m NU20R | Manuela Rotundo; Uruguay | 55.11 m |

=== Combined events ===
| Event | Gold | | Silver | | Bronze | |
|---|---|---|---|---|---|---|
| Heptathlon | Saga Vanninen; Finland | 6084 pts | Serina Riedel; Germany | 5874 pts | Sandrina Sprengel; Germany | 5845 pts |

== Mixed results ==
=== Track ===
| Event | Gold | | Silver | | Bronze | |
|---|---|---|---|---|---|---|
| Mixed 4 × 400 metres relay | United States; Charlie Batholomew; Madison Whyte; Will Sumner; Kennedy Wade; Kaylyn Brown* | 3:17.69 CR, WU20R | India; Barath Sridhar; Priya Mohan; Kapil; Rupal | 3:17.76 AU20R | Jamaica; Jasauna Dennis; Abigail Campbell; Malachi Johnson; Alliah Baker | 3:19.98 |

* – Indicates the athlete competed in preliminary heats but not the final.

== Medal table ==
* Host nation (Colombia)

| Rank | Nation | Gold | Silver | Bronze | Total |
|---|---|---|---|---|---|
| 1 | United States | 7 | 4 | 4 | 15 |
| 2 | Jamaica | 6 | 7 | 3 | 16 |
| 3 | Ethiopia | 6 | 5 | 1 | 12 |
| 4 | Kenya | 3 | 3 | 4 | 10 |
| 5 | South Africa | 2 | 1 | 2 | 5 |
| 6 | Turkey | 2 | 1 | 1 | 4 |
| 7 | France | 2 | 1 | 0 | 3 |
| 8 | Germany | 1 | 4 | 3 | 8 |
| 9 | Sweden | 1 | 2 | 1 | 4 |
| 10 | Finland | 1 | 2 | 0 | 3 |
| 11 | Japan | 1 | 1 | 2 | 4 |
| 11 | Netherlands | 1 | 1 | 2 | 4 |
| 13 | Botswana | 1 | 1 | 0 | 2 |
| 13 | Bulgaria | 1 | 1 | 0 | 2 |
| 13 | Greece | 1 | 1 | 0 | 2 |
| 13 | Mexico | 1 | 1 | 0 | 2 |
| 17 | Great Britain | 1 | 0 | 2 | 3 |
| 18 | Bahamas | 1 | 0 | 1 | 2 |
| 18 | Estonia | 1 | 0 | 1 | 2 |
| 18 | Italy | 1 | 0 | 1 | 2 |
| 18 | Serbia | 1 | 0 | 1 | 2 |
| 18 | Ukraine | 1 | 0 | 1 | 2 |
| 23 | Israel | 1 | 0 | 0 | 1 |
| 23 | Uzbekistan | 1 | 0 | 0 | 1 |
| 25 | Colombia* | 0 | 2 | 1 | 3 |
| 25 | India | 0 | 2 | 1 | 3 |
| 27 | Algeria | 0 | 2 | 0 | 2 |
| 28 | Eritrea | 0 | 1 | 1 | 2 |
| 29 | Cuba | 0 | 1 | 0 | 1 |
| 29 | Slovenia | 0 | 1 | 0 | 1 |
| 29 | Switzerland | 0 | 1 | 0 | 1 |
| 32 | Australia | 0 | 0 | 2 | 2 |
| 32 | Poland | 0 | 0 | 2 | 2 |
| 34 | Bahrain | 0 | 0 | 1 | 1 |
| 34 | Brazil | 0 | 0 | 1 | 1 |
| 34 | Canada | 0 | 0 | 1 | 1 |
| 34 | Cyprus | 0 | 0 | 1 | 1 |
| 34 | Hungary | 0 | 0 | 1 | 1 |
| 34 | Morocco | 0 | 0 | 1 | 1 |
| 34 | Uganda | 0 | 0 | 1 | 1 |
| 34 | Uruguay | 0 | 0 | 1 | 1 |
| Totals (41 entries) | | 45 | 46 | 45 | 136 |

Source: World Athletics U20 Championships Cali 22 Medal Table

== Participation ==
The following is a list of participating nations with the number of qualified athletes in brackets. A country without any qualified athlete could enter either one male or one female. A total 145 National Associations and 1533 athletes were scheduled to compete.

- Anguilla (1)
- Algeria (12)
- Antigua and Barbuda (1)
- Argentina (4)
- Armenia (2)
- Aruba (1)
- American Samoa (1)
- Australia (55)
- Austria (7)
- Bahamas (11)
- Bangladesh (1)
- Barbados (2)
- Burundi (1)
- Belgium (14)
- Belize (1)
- Bolivia (1)
- Botswana (15)
- Brazil (37)
- Bahrain (10)
- Bulgaria (4)
- Burkina Faso (3)
- Canada (32)
- Cayman Islands (2)
- Republic of the Congo (1)
- Chad (1)
- Chile (3)
- Ivory Coast (2)
- Cameroon (3)
- Colombia (33) (hosts)
- Costa Rica (3)
- Croatia (10)
- Cuba (7)
- Cyprus (7)
- Czech Republic (35)
- Denmark (5)
- Djibouti (2)
- Dominica (1)
- Dominican Republic (3)
- Ecuador (17)
- Egypt (9)
- Eritrea (6)
- El Salvador (1)
- Spain (40)
- Estonia (10)
- Ethiopia (19)
- Finland (26)
- France (42)
- Great Britain (43)
- Equatorial Guinea (1)
- Germany (87)
- Greece (24)
- Grenada (3)
- Guatemala (5)
- Guinea (1)
- Guam (1)
- Guyana (4)
- Hong Kong (1)
- Honduras (1)
- Hungary (21)
- Indonesia (1)
- India (37)
- Iran (5)
- Ireland (8)
- Iraq (4)
- Iceland (2)
- Israel (5)
- United States Virgin Islands (1)
- Italy (48)
- British Virgin Islands (2)
- Jamaica (43)
- Japan (34)
- Kazakhstan (4)
- Kenya (28)
- Kyrgyzstan (1)
- Saudi Arabia (6)
- Kuwait (5)
- Latvia (8)
- Lebanon (1)
- Lesotho (1)
- Liechtenstein (1)
- Liberia (1)
- Saint Lucia (1)
- Lithuania (7)
- Luxembourg (1)
- Madagascar (1)
- Morocco (8)
- Malaysia (4)
- Moldova (1)
- Maldives (1)
- Mexico (21)
- Malta (1)
- Monaco (1)
- Mozambique (1)
- Namibia (1)
- Nicaragua (2)
- Netherlands (21)
- Nepal (1)
- Nigeria (26)
- Norway (23)
- New Zealand (12)
- Oman (2)
- Panama (1)
- Paraguay (2)
- Peru (6)
- Palestine (1)
- Papua New Guinea (1)
- Poland (39)
- Portugal (10)
- Puerto Rico (9)
- Qatar (5)
- Romania (20)
- South Africa (48)
- Senegal (1)
- Seychelles (1)
- Singapore (1)
- Saint Kitts and Nevis (5)
- Sierra Leone (1)
- Slovenia (14)
- San Marino (1)
- Serbia (12)
- Sri Lanka (7)
- South Sudan (1)
- Sudan (1)
- Switzerland (38)
- Slovakia (13)
- Sweden (20)
- Syria (1)
- Thailand (9)
- Tajikistan (1)
- Turks and Caicos Islands (1)
- Chinese Taipei (4)
- Trinidad and Tobago (14)
- Tunisia (7)
- Turkey (10)
- Uganda (11)
- Ukraine (15)
- Uruguay (2)
- United States (92)
- Uzbekistan (9)
- Venezuela (7)
- Vietnam (1)
- Saint Vincent and the Grenadines (5)
- Yemen (1)
- Zambia (4)
- Zimbabwe (3)
