= Ármin Szabados =

Hungarian athlete (born 2006)

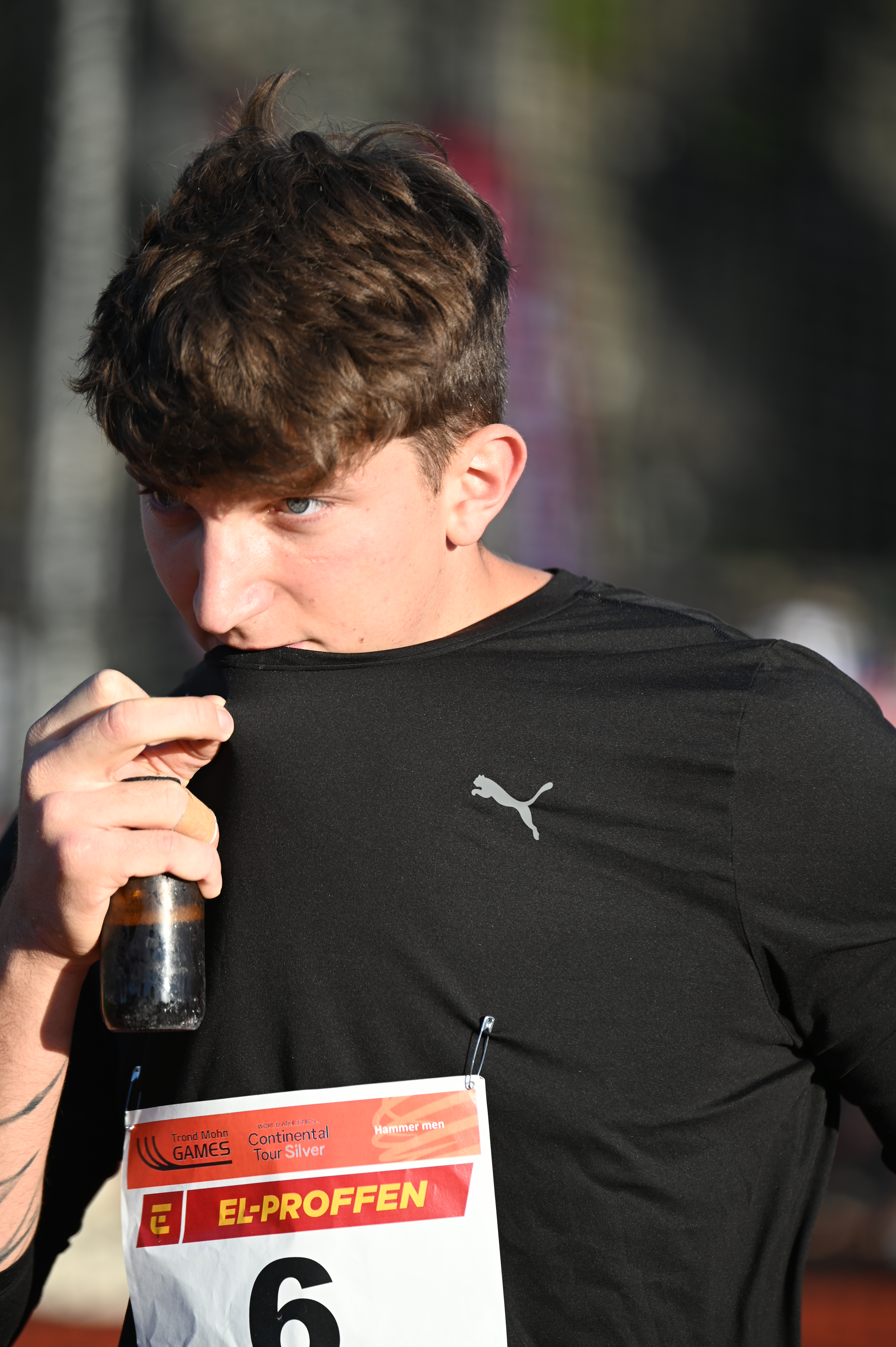
- Armin Szabalos in 2026

Personal information
- Born: 11 January 2006 (age 20)

Sport
- Sport: Athletics
- Event: Hammer throw

Achievements and titles
- Personal bests: Hammer: 80.95 (Veszprém, 2026) NU23R; Hammer: (6kg) 83.25m NU20R (Pápa, 2025)
Medal record
Men's athletics
Representing Hungary
European Throwing Cup
Gold medal – first place	2026 Nicosia	U23 Hammer
World U20 Championships
Bronze medal – third place	2024 Lima	Hammer throw
European U20 Championships
Gold medal – first place	2025 Tampere	Hammer throw
European Youth Olympic Festival
Gold medal – first place	2023 Maribor	Hammer throw
Gold medal – first place	2022 Banská Bystrica	Hammer throw

Ármin Szabados (born 11 January 2006) is a Hungarian hammer thrower. He is the Hungarian under-23 record holder and placed eighth overall at the 2025 World Championships. That year, he won the gold medal at the 2025 European U20 Championships and later won the U23 hammer throw at the 2026 European Throwing Cup.

== Biography ==
Szabados trained as a member of Dobó SE in Szombathely where he was coached by László Németh, having previously worked with him at Haladás VSE. He won a gold medal at the 2022 European Youth Summer Olympic Festival in Banská Bystrica, Slovakia with a throw of 72.64 meters. In April 2023, he won the Hungarian U18 Winter Throwing Championship in Veszprém. He also won the gold medal the following year in the 5 kg hammer throw at the 2023 European Youth Summer Olympic Festival in Maribor, Slovenia, with an effort of 78.92 metres.

In November 2023, Szabados moved back to join Haladás VSE again, where he began to be coached by Balázs Lezsák. He increased his personal best to 78.34 in June 2024 with the 6 kg hammer. He was a bronze medalist in the hammer throw at the 2024 World Athletics U20 Championships in Lima, Peru, throwing 74.88m.

Szabados set a new personal best with the 6 kg hammer of 82.93 metres in April 2025. At the 2025 European Athletics U20 Championships in Tampere, Finland, he reached the final with the biggest throw in qualification of 80.68m before winning gold in the final with all four of his longest throws being enough to win the title and ended with a winning margin of 8.24 metres. In September 2025, he competed in the hammer throw at the senior World Championships in Tokyo, Japan, placing eighth overall. In September 2025, he was nominated for the European Athletics male rising star award.

On 14 March 2026, Szabados won the U23 hammer throw at the 2026 European Throwing Cup in Nicosia, Cyprus with a throw of 74.45 metres. Competing at the VEDAC Throwing Academy Season Opening, the following month, Szabados broke the 80 m barrier for the first time with the senior implement, throwing 80.95 metres to extend his U23 national record by close to three metres. In August 2026, he was a finalist competing at the 2026 European Athletics Championships in Birmingham, England, placing eighth overall in the hammer throw.
