= List of Central American and Caribbean under-20 records in athletics =

Central American and Caribbean Junior records in athletics are the best marks set in an event by an athlete who has not yet reached their 20th birthday in the given year of competition, competing for a member nation of the Central American and Caribbean Athletic Confederation (CACAC). CACAC doesn't maintain an official list for such performances. All bests shown on this list are tracked by statisticians not officially sanctioned by the governing body.

== Outdoor ==
Not ratified or later rescinded by World Athletics

=== Men ===
Event	Record	Athlete	Nationality	Date	Meet	Place	Age	Ref.	Video
100 m	9.99 (+0.3 m/s)	Bouwahjgie Nkrumie	Jamaica	29 March 2023	ISSA/GraceKennedy Boys and Girls Athletics Championships	Kingston, Jamaica	18 years, 68 days		
200 m	19.93 (+1.4 m/s)	Usain Bolt	Jamaica	11 April 2004	CARIFTA Games	Devonshire, Bermuda	17 years, 234 days		
400 m	44.99	Jamal Walton	Cayman Islands	21 July 2017	Pan American U20 Championships	Trujillo, Peru	18 years, 238 days		
800 m	1:47.38	Wesley Vázquez	Puerto Rico	14 May 2011	Ponce Grand Prix	Ponce, Puerto Rico	17 years, 48 days		
1500 m	3:41.21	Luis Grijalva	Guatemala	20 April 2018	Bryan Clay Invitational	Azusa, United States	19 years, 10 days		
3000 m	8:53.78	Osmani Calzado	Cuba	18 March 2005	Cuban Championships	Havana, Cuba	16 years, 264 days		
5000 m									
10,000 m									
Marathon									
110 m hurdles (99 cm)	12.99 (+0.3 m/s)	Damion Thomas	Jamaica	23 June 2018	Jamaican Junior Championships	Kingston, Jamaica	18 years, 359 days		
110 m hurdles	13.32 (+0.7 m/s)	Dejour Russell	Jamaica	24 June 2017	Jamaican Championships	Kingston, Jamaica	17 years, 84 days		
400 m hurdles	47.34	Roshawn Clarke	Jamaica	21 August 2023	World Championships	Budapest, Hungary	19 years, 51 days		
3000 m steeplechase									
High jump	2.36 m	Javier Sotomayor	Cuba	23 February 1986		Santiago de Cuba, Cuba	18 years, 133 days		
Pole vault									
Long jump	8.33 m (+2.0 m/s)	Maykel Massó	Cuba	14 July 2017	Meeting de Atletismo Madrid	Madrid, Spain	18 years, 67 days		
Triple jump	17.87 m (+1.3 m/s)	Jaydon Hibbert	Jamaica	13 May 2023	SEC Championships	Baton Rouge, United States	18 years, 116 days		
Shot put	16.33 m	Denzel Phillips	Saint Lucia	17 January 2026	World Class Development Meet	Kingston, Jamaica	18 years, 316 days		
Discus throw (1.75 kg)	66.88 m	Traves Smikle	Jamaica	31 March 2011		Kingston, Jamaica	18 years, 328 days		
Discus throw (2.0 kg)	61.54 m	Pedro Acosta	Cuba	15 July 1989		Havana, Cuba	19 years, 181 days		
Hammer throw (6.0 kg)	79.14 m	Reinier Mejias	Cuba	27 June 2009		Havana, Cuba			
Hammer throw (7.26 kg)	69.78 m	Alberto Sanchez	Cuba	18 September 1992		Seoul, South Korea	19 years, 229 days		
Javelin throw (800 g)	84.58 m	Keshorn Walcott	Trinidad and Tobago	11 August 2012	Olympic Games	London, United Kingdom	19 years, 131 days		
Decathlon (Senior implements)	8257pts	Yordani García	Cuba	31 August - 1 September 2007	World Championships	Osaka, Japan	18 years, 284 days		
Decathlon (Senior implements)	100m (wind) / Long jump (wind) / Shot put / High jump / 400m / 110m H (wind) / Discus / Pole vault / Javelin / 1500m; 10.73 (+0.7 m/s) / 7.15 m (+0.2 m/s) / 14.94 m / 2.09 m / 49.25 / 14.08 (−0.2 m/s) / 42.91 m / 4.70 m / 68.74 m / 4:55.42								
5000 m walk (track)	19:34.07	Osvaldo Miramontes	Mexico	8 August 2026	World U20 Championships	Eugene, United States	17 years, 360 days		
10,000 m walk (track)	39:27.10	Emiliano Barba	Mexico	30 August 2024	World U20 Championships	Lima, Peru	17 years, 160 days		
10 km walk (road)	40:46	Bryan Alexander Matías Ortíz	Guatemala	8 May 2022	Campeonato International De Marcha	San Jerónimo, Guatemala	17 years, 29 days		
20 km walk (road)									
50 km walk (road)									
4 × 100 m relay	38.61 A	Alexavier Monfried; Bryan Levell; Andrew Gilipps; Sandrey Davison	Jamaica	22 August 2021	World U20 Championships	Nairobi, Kenya	17 years, 242 days 18 years, 209 days		
4 × 400 m relay	3:00.99	Evaldo Whitehorne; Jeremy Farr; Bovel McPherson; Anthony Cox	Jamaica	21 July 2019	Pan American U20 Championships	San José, Costa Rica	18 years, 329 days		
Swedish medley relay	1:49.23	Waseem Williams; Michael O'Hara; Okeen Williams; Martin Manley	Jamaica	14 July 2013	World Youth Championships	Donetsk, Ukraine	16 years, 187 days 16 years, 288 days 17 years, 194 days 16 years, 126 days		

=== Women ===
Event	Record	Athlete	Nationality	Date	Meet	Place	Age	Ref.
100 m	10.92 (+1.0 m/s)	Alana Reid	Jamaica	29 March 2023	ISSA/GraceKennedy Boys and Girls Athletics Championships	Kingston, Jamaica	18 years, 68 days	
200 m	22.45 (+0.9 m/s)	Shaunae Miller	Bahamas	22 June 2013	Bahamian Championships	Nassau, Bahamas	19 years, 53 days	
400 m	50.70	Shaunae Miller	Bahamas	7 June 2013	NCAA Division I Championships	Eugene, United States	19 years, 53 days	
800 m	1:57.74	Sahily Diago	Cuba	25 May 2014	Memorial Barrientos	Havana, Cuba	18 years, 272 days	
1000 m								
1500 m								
Mile								
3000 m								
5000 m								
10,000 m	32:22.99	Madaí Pérez	Mexico	17 April 1999	Mt. SAC Relays	Walnut, United States	19 years, 74 days	
3000 m steeplechase								
100 m hurdles	12.71 (+1.3 m/s)	Britany Anderson	Jamaica	24 July 2019	Motonet Grand Prix	Joensuu, Finland	18 years, 174 days	
400 m hurdles								
High jump	1.98 m	Silvia Costa	Cuba	11 July 1983		Edmonton, Canada	19 years, 68 days	
Pole vault	3.00 m	Naya Jules	Saint Lucia	19 April 2025	CARIFTA Games	Port of Spain, Trinidad and Tobago	17 years, 129 days	
Long jump	6.74 m A (+0.4 m/s)	Yudelkis Fernandez	Cuba	22 May 2004		Mexico City, Mexico	19 years, 84 days	
Triple jump	14.53 m (+0.5 m/s)	Leyanis Perez	Cuba	29 June 2021	José Antonio Cansino Memorial	Castellón, Spain	19 years, 170 days	
Shot put	18.78	Yumileidi Cumbá	Cuba	10 June 1994		Camagüey, Cuba	19 years, 119 days	
Discus throw	63.60	Hilda Ramos	Cuba	19 May 1983		Havana, Cuba	18 years, 260 days	
Hammer throw	68.74	Arasay Thondike	Cuba	20 May 2005		Havana, Cuba	18 years, 357 days	
Javelin throw	63.86 m	Yuleimis Aguilar	Cuba	2 August 2015	Pan American Junior Championships	Edmonton, Canada	18 years, 364 days	
Heptathlon	6231 pts	Yorgelis Rodríguez	Cuba	21–22 February 2014		Havana, Cuba	19 years, 28 days	
Heptathlon	100m H (wind) / High jump / Shot put / 200m (wind) / Long jump (wind) / Javelin / 800m; 14.01 (±0.0 m/s) / 1.84 m / 14.21 m / 24.93 (±0.0 m/s) / 6.03 m (±0.0 m/s) / 47.58 m / 2:17.93							
5 km walk (road)	23:06+	Valeria Ortuño	Mexico	8 April 2017	EA Race Walking Permit Meeting	Poděbrady, Czech Republic	18 years, 316 days	
10,000 m walk (track)	44:13.88	Alegna González	Mexico	14 July 2018	World U20 Championships	Tampere, Finland	19 years, 193 days	
10 km walk (road)	44:50	Rachelle De Orbeta	Puerto Rico	10 February 2019	Oceania Race Walking Championships	Adelaide, Australia	18 years, 320 days	
20,000 m walk (track)								
20 km walk (road)	1:31:48	Valeria Ortuño	Mexico	8 April 2017	EA Race Walking Permit Meeting	Poděbrady, Czech Republic	18 years, 316 days	
4 × 100 m relay	42.59 A	Serena Cole; Tina Clayton; Kerrica Hill; Tia Clayton	Jamaica	5 August 2022	World U20 Championships	Cali, Colombia	18 years, 40 days 17 years, 353 days 17 years, 152 days 17 years, 352 days	
4 × 100 m relay	42.58 (Note: all team members were not subjected to doping control after the race)	Serena Cole; Tina Clayton; Brianna Lyston; Tia Clayton	Jamaica	17 April 2022	CARIFTA Games	Kingston, Jamaica	17 years, 295 days 17 years, 243 days 17 years, 328 days 17 years, 243 days	
4 × 400 m relay								

=== Mixed ===
Event	Record	Athlete	Nation	Date	Meet	Place	Age	Ref.
4 × 400 m relay	3:19.98 A	Jasauna Dennis; Abigail Campbell; Malachi Johnson; Alliah Baker	Jamaica	2 August 2022	World U20 Championships	Cali, Colombia	17 years, 215 days	

== Indoor ==
=== Men ===
Event	Record	Athlete	Nationality	Date	Meet	Place	Age	Ref.
60 m								
200 m								
400 m	44.80	Kirani James	Grenada	27 February 2011	SEC Championships	Fayetteville, United States	18 years, 179 days	
800 m								
1000 m								
1500 m								
Mile								
3000 m								
5000 m								
60 m hurdles								
High jump	2.30 m	Javier Sotomayor	Cuba	18 January 1985		Paris, France	17 years, 97 days	
Pole vault								
Long jump								
Triple jump								
Shot put								
Heptathlon								
Heptathlon	60m / Long jump / Shot put / High jump / 60m H / Pole vault / 1000m							
5000 m walk	20:18.99	Alberto Cruz	Mexico	5 March 1989	World Indoor Championships	Budapest, Hungary	16 years, 272 days	
4 × 400 m relay								

=== Women ===
Event	Record	Athlete	Nationality	Date	Meet	Place	Age	Ref.
50 m	6.24+	Adaejah Hodge	British Virgin Islands	12 January 2024	VA Showcase	Virginia Beach, United States	17 years, 305 days	
60 m	7.10 A	Julien Alfred	Saint Lucia	25 January 2020	Martin Luther King Invitational	Albuquerque, United States	18 years, 229 days	
200 m	22.33	Adaejah Hodge	British Virgin Islands	12 March 2023	New Balance Nationals	Boston, United States	16 years, 364 days	
300 m	36.97	Adaejah Hodge	British Virgin Islands	12 January 2024	Virginia Showcase	Virginia Beach, United States	17 years, 305 days	
400 m								
800 m								
1500 m								
Mile								
3000 m								
5000 m								
60 m hurdles	7.91	Ackera Nugent	Jamaica	25 January 2020	Big 12 Championships	Lubbock, United States	18 years, 303 days	
High jump								
Pole vault								
Long jump								
Triple jump								
Shot put								
Pentathlon	4194 pts	Akela Jones	Barbados	31 January 2014	Wichita State Varsity Apartments Invitational	Wichita, United States	18 years, 284 days	
Pentathlon	60m H / High jump / Shot put / Long jump / 800m; 8.49 / 1.85 m / 12.19 m / 6.11 m / 2:29.62							
3000 m walk								
4 × 400 m relay								
