= 2022 World Athletics U20 Championships – Women's 100 metres =

Women's 100 metres at the 2022 World Athletics U20 Championships
- Venue: Estadio Olímpico Pascual Guerrero
- Dates: 2 August (heats); 3 August (semifinal & final)
- Competitors: 55 from 40 nations
- Winning time: 10.95

Medalists
gold medal	Tina Clayton	Jamaica
silver medal	Serena Cole	Jamaica
bronze medal	Shawnti Jackson	United States
bronze medal	N'Ketia Seedo	Netherlands

The women's 100 metres at the 2022 World Athletics U20 Championships was held at the Estadio Olímpico Pascual Guerrero in Cali, Colombia on 2 and 3 August 2022.

== Records ==
U20 standing records prior to the 2022 World Athletics U20 Championships were as follows:

Standing records prior to the 2022 World Athletics U20 Championships
World U20 Record	Tamari Davis (USA)	10.83	Memphis, United States	30 July 2022
Championship Record	Twanisha Terry (USA)	11.03	Tampere Finland	12 July 2018
World U20 Leading	Tamari Davis (USA)	10.83	Memphis, United States	30 July 2022

== Results ==
=== Round 1 ===
Qualification: First 3 of each heat (Q) and the 3 fastest times (q) qualified for the semifinals.

Rank	Heat	Lane	Name	Nationality	Time	Note
1	4	2	Tima Seikeseye Godbless	Nigeria	11.09	Q, NU20R
2	6	7	N'Ketia Seedo	Netherlands	11.16	Q, NU20R
3	5	3	Shawnti Jackson	United States	11.28	Q, PB
4	3	4	Viwe Jingqi	South Africa	11.36 [.359]	Q
4	6	5	Nia Wedderburn-Goodison	Great Britain	11.36 [.359]	Q, PB
6	1	8	Tina Clayton	Jamaica	11.38	Q
7	2	1	Serena Cole	Jamaica	11.39	Q
8	7	1	Mia Brahe-Pedersen	United States	11.45	Q
9	7	2	Elena Guiu	Spain	11.46	Q, PB
10	1	6	Joy Eze	Great Britain	11.47	Q, SB
11	6	1	Amy Candrlic	Canada	11.51	Q, PB
12	5	8	Polyniki Emmanouilidou	Greece	11.55 [.549]	Q
13	3	5	Praise Ofoku	Nigeria	11.55 [.550]	Q
13	1	7	Eva Kubíčková	Czech Republic	11.55 [.550]	Q
15	4	7	Taylah Cruttenden	Australia	11.58 [.576]	Q
16	3	1	Kishawna Niles	Barbados	11.58 [.580]	Q
17	2	2	Brynley McDermott	Canada	11.61 [.601]	Q, PB
18	2	4	Rosina Schneider	Germany	11.61 [.603]	Q
19	6	6	Emma Van Camp	Switzerland	11.64	q, PB
20	1	4	Liranyi Alonso	Dominican Republic	11.65	q, SB
21	7	8	Anna Pursiainen	Finland	11.66	Q
22	4	1	Elvira Tanderud	Sweden	11.69	Q
23	2	5	Lucy-May Sleeman	Ireland	11.71 [.701]	q
24	2	8	Shaniqua Bascombe	Trinidad and Tobago	11.71 [.702]	
25	7	3	Tainara Mees	Brazil	11.71 [.709]	PB
26	5	4	Yarima Garcia	Cuba	11.72 [.713]	Q
27	5	7	Maria Mihalache	Romania	11.72 [.715]	SB
28	6	8	Kayla La Grange	South Africa	11.73 [.724]	PB
29	4	8	Soraya Becerra	Switzerland	11.73 [.726]	
30	2	6	Maren Bakke Amundsen	Norway	11.73 [.730]	
31	6	3	Andrė Ožechauskaitė	Lithuania	11.76	SB
32	5	5	Nora Lindahl	Sweden	11.77	
33	3	7	Paige Archer	Bahamas	11.78	
34	6	2	Sina Kammerschmitt	Germany	11.79 [.784]	
35	3	2	Laura Martínez	Colombia	11.79 [.789]	
36	3	3	Leonor Ferreira	Portugal	11.81 [.802]	
37	1	5	Mariandreé Chacón	Guatemala	11.81 [.807]	
38	2	7	Anna Luca Kocsis	Hungary	11.82	
39	7	6	Hayley Reynolds	Australia	11.86	
40	1	2	Gladymar Torres	Puerto Rico	11.87	
41	7	7	Avantika Narale	India	11.89 [.882]	
42	1	3	Ludovica Galuppi	Italy	11.89 [.890]	
43	3	6	Talia van Rooyen	New Zealand	11.94 [.936]	
44	6	4	Shatalya Dorsett	Bahamas	11.94 [.940]	
45	4	4	Du Y Hoang	Vietnam	11.95	
46	7	4	Agnese Musica	Italy	11.97	
47	7	5	Kyah La Fortune	Trinidad and Tobago	11.99	
48	4	6	Leticia Ruzilla	Brazil	12.01	
49	5	1	Anastasija Miča	Serbia	12.05	
50	3	8	Mayssa Mouawad	Lebanon	12.09	PB
51	4	3	Sudeshna Shivankar	India	12.12	
52	5	6	Layla Kamal	Bahrain	12.13	
53	2	3	Blessings Miyambo	Zambia	12.26	PB
54	4	5	Alessandra Gasparelli	San Marino	12.27	
55	1	1	Alba Mbo Nchama	Equatorial Guinea	13.32	PB
	5	2	Orane Doumbe	France	DNS	

=== Semifinals ===
Qualification: First 2 of each heat (Q) and the 2 fastest times (q) qualified for the final.

Rank	Heat	Lane	Name	Nationality	Time	Note
1	1	5	Shawnti Jackson	United States	11.16	Q, PB
2	2	5	Tina Clayton	Jamaica	11.17	Q
3	3	4	Tima Seikeseye Godbless	Nigeria	11.20	Q
4	1	3	Viwe Jingqi	South Africa	11.25	Q, NU20R
5	2	4	N'Ketia Seedo	Netherlands	11.26	Q
6	3	5	Serena Cole	Jamaica	11.29	Q
7	3	3	Mia Brahe-Pedersen	United States	11.36	q
8	1	6	Elena Guiu	Spain	11.46	q, PB
9	1	4	Joy Eze	Great Britain	11.49	
10	2	6	Nia Wedderburn-Goodison	Great Britain	11.51 [.501]	
11	3	6	Polyniki Emmanouilidou	Greece	11.51 [.510]	
12	1	7	Eva Kubíčková	Czech Republic	11.52	
13	1	1	Yarima Garcia	Cuba	11.56	PB
14	3	8	Rosina Schneider	Germany	11.61 [.604]	
15	2	2	Liranyi Alonso	Dominican Republic	11.61 [.608]	SB
16	3	2	Lucy-May Sleeman	Ireland	11.62	PB
17	2	7	Taylah Cruttenden	Australia	11.67	
18	2	3	Praise Ofoku	Nigeria	11.68	
19	3	1	Anna Pursiainen	Finland	11.69	
20	3	7	Brynley McDermott	Canada	11.71	
21	1	8	Amy Candrlic	Canada	11.72	
22	2	1	Elvira Tanderud	Sweden	11.74	
23	2	8	Kishawna Niles	Barbados	11.79	
24	1	2	Emma Van Camp	Switzerland	11.89	

=== Final ===
The final was held on 3 August at 20:41

Rank	Lane	Name	Nationality	Time	Note
1st place, gold medalist(s)	5	Tina Clayton	Jamaica	10.95	CR
2nd place, silver medalist(s)	7	Serena Cole	Jamaica	11.14	
3rd place, bronze medalist(s)	4	Shawnti Jackson	United States	11.15 [.148]	PB
3rd place, bronze medalist(s)	8	N'Ketia Seedo	Netherlands	11.15 [.148]	NU20R
5	6	Tima Seikeseye Godbless	Nigeria	11.19	
6	3	Viwe Jingqi	South Africa	11.23	NU20R
7	2	Mia Brahe-Pedersen	United States	11.33	
8	1	Elena Guiu	Spain	11.52	
