= Shaniqua Bascombe =

Trinidadian athlete (born 2003)

Personal information
- Born: 8 November 2003 (age 22)

Sport
- Sport: Athletics
- Event: Sprint

Achievements and titles
- Personal bests: 60m: 7.22 (Spanish Town, 2026); 100m: 11.16 (Port of Spain, 2025); 200m: 22.31 (Glasgow, 2026)
Medal record
Women's athletics
Representing Trinidad and Tobago
Commonwealth Games
Silver medal – second place	2026 Glasglow	200 m
Bronze medal – third place	2026 Glasgow	4×100m relay
Junior Pan American Games
Gold medal – first place	2025 Asunción	100 m
Silver medal – second place	2025 Asunción	4×100 m relay
NACAC U23 Championships
Bronze medal – third place	2023 San José	4x100m relay
CARIFTA Games Junior (U20)
Silver medal – second place	2022 Kingston	200 m
Bronze medal – third place	2022 Kingston	100 m
Bronze medal – third place	2022 Kingston	4x100 m

Shaniqua Bascombe (born 8 November 2003) is a sprinter from Trinidad and Tobago. She won the silver medal in the 200 metres at the 2026 Commonwealth Games. She won the 100 metres gold medal at the 2025 Junior Pan American Games.

== Biography ==
Bascombe is from Maraval and started running at an early age, and attended New Butler Associate College from The age of 16 years-old having previously attended St James Secondary School. She later received help from Jehue Gordon to train in Jamaica. She was named the girls' Athlete of the Year by the NAAA (National Association of Athletic Administrations) for 2019.

She won national age-group titles in 2022 over 100 metres and 200 metres in March 2022, to earn selection for the 2022 CARIFTA Games, where she was a bronze medalist in the 100 metres behind Tia and Tina Clayton and a silver medalist in the 200 metres behind Brianna Lyston. In 2023, she won a bronze medal in the 4 × 100 m women's relay at the 2023 NACAC U23 Championships in San José, Costa Rica.

In April 2025, she ran a personal best 11.46 seconds in Kingston, Jamaica, before beating Kishawna Niles of Barbados in the 100m B race at the Jamaican Championships in 11.26 seconds. At the Trinidad & Tobago Championships in August 2025, she set a new personal best for the 100 metres of 11.16 seconds before finishing runner-up to Leah Bertrand in the final.

She won two medals at the 2025 Pan American Junior Games in Asunción, Paraguay in August 2025, winning the 100 metres final ahead of Liranyi Alonso of the Dominican Republic in 11.19 seconds, having run 11.17 seconds in the semi-final. She had further success at the Games, winning a silver medal in the 4 x 100 metres relay.

Bascombe ran a personal best 7.22 seconds for the 60 metres at the Puma JAAA Fuller-Anderson Development Meet at the GC Foster College on 17 January 2026. In April, she ran a personal best 22.68 seconds to win the Velocity Fest 200 metres in Jamaica.

On 30 July, Bascombe set a personal best 22.31 seconds qualifying for the final of the 200 metres at the 2026 Commonwealth Games in Glasgow, Scotland, recording the second fastest time of all the semi-finals behind Adeajah Hodge, before winning the silver medal in the final behind Hodge in 22.35 seconds. She later also won the bronze medal in the women's 4 × 100 m relay.
