= 2022 World Athletics U20 Championships – Women's 200 metres =

Women's 200 metres at the 2022 World Athletics U20 Championships
- Venue: Estadio Olímpico Pascual Guerrero
- Dates: 4 August (heats & semifinals); 5 August (final)
- Competitors: 46 from 30 nations
- Winning time: 22.65

Medalists
gold medal	Brianna Lyston	Jamaica
silver medal	Jayla Jamison	United States
bronze medal	Alana Reid	Jamaica

The women's 200 metres at the 2022 World Athletics U20 Championships was held at the Estadio Olímpico Pascual Guerrero in Cali, Colombia on 4 and 5 August 2022.

== Records ==
U20 standing records prior to the 2022 World Athletics U20 Championships were as follows:

Standing records prior to the 2022 World Athletics U20 Championships
World U20 Record	Christine Mboma (NAM)	21.81	Tokyo, Japan	3 August 2021
Championship Record	Christine Mboma (NAM)	21.84	Nairobi, Kenya	21 August 2021
World U20 Leading	Christine Mboma (NAM)	21.87	Gaborone, Botswana	30 April 2022

== Results ==
=== Round 1 ===
Qualification: First 3 of each heat (Q) and the 6 fastest times (q) qualified for the semifinals.

Rank	Heat	Lane	Name	Nationality	Time	Note
1	5	3	Mia Brahe-Pedersen	United States	23.25	Q
2	4	6	Jayla Jamison	United States	23.36	Q
3	5	1	Sophie Walton	Great Britain	23.40	Q, PB
4	1	5	Polyniki Emmanouilidou	Greece	23.43	Q
5	6	2	Yarima Garcia	Cuba	23.46 [.453]	Q, PB
6	6	7	Serena Kouassi	France	23.46 [.457]	Q
7	3	6	Alana Reid	Jamaica	23.47	Q
8	1	8	Viwe Jingqi	South Africa	23.54	Q
9	1	1	Adetutu Funmilayo Aladeloye	Nigeria	23.56 [.555]	Q, PB
10	2	6	Brianna Lyston	Jamaica	23.56 [.560]	Q
11	6	3	Success Eduan	Great Britain	23.58	Q
12	1	3	Shaniqua Bascombe	Trinidad and Tobago	23.63	q, SB
13	6	1	Emily Martin	Canada	23.67	q, PB
14	5	7	Brynley McDermott	Canada	23.74	Q, PB
15	4	7	Liranyi Alonso	Dominican Republic	23.76	Q, PB
16	6	8	Obi Jennifer Chukwuka	Nigeria	23.77	q, PB
17	3	2	Magdalena Niemczyk	Poland	23.78	Q
18	4	3	Nora Lindahl	Sweden	23.80	Q, PB
19	4	1	Maren Bakke Amundsen	Norway	23.84	q
20	4	8	Vanessa Baldé	Germany	23.88	q, PB
21	2	4	Elvira Tanderud	Sweden	23.89 [.884]	Q
22	3	8	Anna Pursiainen	Finland	23.89 [.886]	Q
23	5	5	Olivia Rose Inkster	Australia	23.90	q, SB
24	2	8	Mariandreé Chacón	Guatemala	23.91	Q, NU20R
25	2	5	Paige Archer	Bahamas	23.92	PB
26	6	4	Maria Valeria Bisericescu	Romania	23.95	PB
27	5	2	Ilenia Angelini	Italy	24.00	
28	3	3	Marta Amouhin Amani	Italy	24.01	PB
29	3	7	Leonor Ferreira	Portugal	24.02 [.013]	PB
30	2	7	Nele Jaworski	Germany	24.02 [.018]	
31	6	5	Selina Furler	Switzerland	24.03	PB
32	3	4	Georgia Harris	Australia	24.06	
33	1	4	Lucy-May Sleeman	Ireland	24.08	
34	3	5	Kayla La Grange	South Africa	24.11	
35	4	2	Melany Bolaño	Colombia	24.16	
36	2	2	Maria Mihalache	Romania	24.21	SB
37	6	6	Montserrat Rodríguez	Mexico	24.26	PB
38	5	6	Ana Rus	Slovenia	24.39	
39	1	6	Maïwenn L'Heveder	France	24.40	
40	4	4	Lacarthea Cooper	Bahamas	24.44	
41	1	7	Itzia Mejia	Mexico	24.50	
42	3	1	María Ignacia Aspillaga	Chile	24.56	
43	5	4	Gladymar Torres	Puerto Rico	24.58	
44	5	8	Manon Berclaz	Switzerland	24.74	
45	1	2	Sudeshna Shivankar	India	25.08	
46	2	3	Alianni Rosario Arrindel	Dominican Republic	31.93	
	4	5	Akrisa Eristee	British Virgin Islands	DNS	

=== Semifinals ===
Qualification: First 2 of each heat (Q) and the 2 fastest times (q) qualified for the final.

Rank	Heat	Lane	Name	Nationality	Time	Note
1	2	4	Brianna Lyston	Jamaica	22.83	Q
2	2	6	Mia Brahe-Pedersen	United States	22.95	Q, PB
3	3	5	Jayla Jamison	United States	23.01	Q
4	1	6	Viwe Jingqi	South Africa	23.12	Q
5	3	6	Alana Reid	Jamaica	23.16	Q, PB
6	1	4	Polyniki Emmanouilidou	Greece	23.20	Q, NU20R
7	2	3	Sophie Walton	Great Britain	23.24	q, PB
8	1	5	Yarima Garcia	Cuba	23.40	q, PB
9	2	5	Elvira Tanderud	Sweden	23.44	SB
10	3	3	Serena Kouassi	France	23.45	
11	1	2	Maren Bakke Amundsen	Norway	23.47	PB
12	3	8	Success Eduan	Great Britain	23.56	
13	1	3	Liranyi Alonso	Dominican Republic	23.59 [.589]	PB
14	3	4	Magdalena Niemczyk	Poland	23.59 [.590]	
15	1	7	Brynley McDermott	Canada	23.63	PB
16	1	8	Nora Lindahl	Sweden	23.74	PB
17	3	1	Emily Martin	Canada	23.79	
18	2	1	Shaniqua Bascombe	Trinidad and Tobago	23.82	
19	3	2	Vanessa Baldé	Germany	23.85	PB
20	2	8	Adetutu Funmilayo Aladeloye	Nigeria	23.89	
21	2	7	Mariandreé Chacón	Guatemala	23.97 [.964]	
22	2	2	Olivia Rose Inkster	Australia	23.97 [.969]	
23	3	7	Anna Pursiainen	Finland	24.02	
	1	1	Obi Jennifer Chukwuka	Nigeria	DNS	

=== Final ===
The final was held on 3 August at 20:41

Rank	Lane	Name	Nationality	Time	Note
1st place, gold medalist(s)	5	Brianna Lyston	Jamaica	22.65	
2nd place, silver medalist(s)	6	Jayla Jamison	United States	22.77	PB
3rd place, bronze medalist(s)	8	Alana Reid	Jamaica	22.95	PB
4	3	Mia Brahe-Pedersen	United States	23.06	
5	7	Polyniki Emmanouilidou	Greece	23.42	
6	1	Sophie Walton	Great Britain	23.43	
7	2	Yarima Garcia	Cuba	23.46	
	4	Viwe Jingqi	South Africa	DNF	
