= 2022 CARIFTA Games =

XLIX CARIFTA Games
- Dates: 16–18 April
- Host city: Kingston, Jamaica
- Venue: Independence Park
- Level: U20 and U17
- Events: U20: 34 (incl. 3 open), U17: 30

The 2022 CARIFTA Games took place between 16 and 18 April 2022, after a two-year hiatus due to COVID-19 pandemic. The event was held at the Independence Park in Kingston, Jamaica.

== Medal summary ==
=== Boys U-20 ===
Event	Gold		Silver		Bronze	
100 metres (+0.7 m/s)	Deandre Daley; Jamaica	10.23	Bouwahjgie Nkrumie; Jamaica	10.28	Zachary Evans; Bahamas	10.45
200 metres (-2.5 m/s)	Bryan Levell; Jamaica	21.18	Sandrey Davison; Jamaica	21.35	Nazzio John; Grenada	21.70
400 metres	Delano Kenedy; Jamaica	46.66	Shemar Palmer; Jamaica	46.97	Amal Glasgow; Saint Vincent and the Grenadines	47.06
800 metres	J'voughnn Blake; Jamaica	1:49.89	Nathan Cumberbatch; Trinidad and Tobago	1:51.86	Adrian Nethersole; Jamaica	1:51.96
1500 metres	J'voughnn Blake; Jamaica	4:00.04	Adrian Nethersole; Jamaica	4:01.45	Troy Llanos; Trinidad and Tobago	4:01.47
5000 metres ^{†}	Mitchell Curtis; Bahamas	16:07.57	Nicholas Power; Jamaica	16:08.93	Tafari Waldron; Trinidad and Tobago	16:35.73
110 metres hurdles (99 cm) (-2.0 m/s)	Matthew Sophia; Curaçao	13.74	Demario Prince; Jamaica	13.88	Antone Andrews; Bahamas	13.91
400 metres hurdles	Roshawn Clarke; Jamaica	50.68	Shimar Bain; Bahamas	52.83	Craig Prendergast; Jamaica	55.08
4 × 100 metres relay	Jamaica; Bouwahjgie Nkrumie; Deandre Daley; Sandrey Davison; Bryan Levell	39.15 GR	Bahamas; Zachary Evans; Zion Campbell; Keano Ferguson; Carlos Brown Jr.	40.41	Cayman Islands; Jaiden Reid; Jamar Ellis; Alex Gordon; Davonte Howell	40.72
4 × 400 metres relay	Jamaica; Shemar Palmer; Roshawn Clarke; Bryan Levell; Delano Kennedy	3:08.94	Trinidad and Tobago; Rinaldo Moore; Shakeem McKay; Keone John; Cyril Sumner	3:09.67	Barbados; Josiah Parris; Aren Spencer; Jahleel Armstrong; Ross Walrond	3:10.71
High jump	Aaron Antoine; Trinidad and Tobago	2.16m	Brandon Pottinger; Jamaica	2.14m	Verrol Sam; Saint Vincent and the Grenadines	2.00m
Pole vault ^{†}	Brenden Vanderpool; Bahamas	4.35m	Jeremiah Felix; Saint Lucia	4.10m	Isaiah Patrick; Grenada	3.70m
Long jump	Jaydon Hibbert; Jamaica	7.62m	Uroy Ryan; Saint Vincent and the Grenadines	7.52m	Aren Spencer; Barbados	7.48m (w)
Triple jump	Jaydon Hibbert; Jamaica	17.05m (w)	Aren Spencer; Barbados	15.80m NJR	Royan Walters; Jamaica	15.59m
Shot put (6.0 kg)	Kobe Lawrence; Jamaica	20.02m GR	Christopher Young; Jamaica	19.12m	Kevon Hinds; Barbados	16.18m
Discus throw (1.75 kg)	Kobe Lawrence; Jamaica	60.77m	Christopher Young; Jamaica	54.30m	Jaden James; Trinidad and Tobago	52.28m
Javelin throw (800 gr)	Keyshawn Strachan; Bahamas	79.89m GR	Anthony Diaz; Trinidad and Tobago	63.69m	Cameron Thomas; Grenada	60.80m
Octathlon ^{†}	Kevin Brooks; Jamaica	4942	Lynden Johnson; Bahamas	4894	Wooslyn Harvey; Turks and Caicos Islands	4888

^{†}: Open event for both junior and youth athletes.

=== Girls U-20 ===
Event	Gold		Silver		Bronze	
100 metres (+0.6 m/s)	Tina Clayton; Jamaica	11.22	Tia Clayton; Jamaica	11.30	Shaniqua Bascombe; Trinidad and Tobago	11.57
200 metres (-1.7 m/s)	Brianna Lyston; Jamaica	23.16	Shaniqua Bascombe; Trinidad and Tobago	24.18	Kayla Kelly; Jamaica	24.33
400 metres	Kayla Kelly; Jamaica	52.32	Oneika McAnnuff; Jamaica	52.52	Caitlyn Bobb; Bermuda	53.12
800 metres	Jodyann Mitchell; Jamaica	2:09.73	Layla Haynes; Barbados	2:10.58	Adriel Austin; Guyana	2:13.62
1500 metres	Rickeisha Simms; Jamaica	4:44.18	Samantha Pryce; Jamaica	4:44.77	Layla Haynes; Barbados	4:45.10
3000 metres ^{†}	Samantha Pryce; Jamaica	10:40.07	Attoya Harvey; Guyana	10:51.40	Ashara Frater; Jamaica	10:03.76
100 metres hurdles (-2.0 m/s)	Alexis James; Jamaica	13.32	Oneka Wilson; Jamaica	13.67	Nya Browne; Barbados	14.63
400 metres hurdles	Safhia Hinds; Jamaica	58.96	Shackelia Green; Jamaica	59.77	Natasha Fox; Trinidad and Tobago	62.35
4 × 100 metres relay	Jamaica; Serena Cole; Tina Clayton; Brianna Lyston; Tia Clayton	42.58 CR	Barbados; Nya Browne; Rickyla Fagan; Shadae Worrell; Kishawna Niles	45.36NJR	Trinidad and Tobago; Kayla Caesar; Shaniqua Bascombe; Karessa Kirton; Kyah La Fortune	46.12
4 × 400 metres relay	Jamaica; Safhia Hinds; Oneika McAnnuff; Shackelia Green; Rushana Dwyer	3:36.81	British Virgin Islands; Akeela McMaster; Kenyatta Grate; Kaelyaah Liburd; Akrissa Eristee	3:45.67	Bermuda; Sanaa Morris; Keturah Buford-Trott; Shayla Cann; Caitlyn Bobb	3:48.69
High jump	Annishka McDonald; Jamaica	1.75m	Malaika Cunningham; Jamaica	1.70m	Ahsharean Enoe; Grenada	1.65m
Long jump	Serena Cole; Jamaica	5.89m (w)	Kayssia Hudson; French Guiana	5.77m	Kay-Lagay Clarke; Jamaica	5.64m (w)
Triple jump	Kayssia Hudson; French Guiana	12.34m	Jo-Anna Pinnock; Jamaica	12.13m	Alyssa Dyett; Antigua and Barbuda	12.04m
Shot put	Treneese Hamilton; Dominica	14.58m	Britannia Johnson; Jamaica	14.19m	Alicia Grootfaam; Suriname	12.97m
Discus throw	Cedricka Williams; Jamaica	51.24m	Britannia Johnson; Jamaica	49.74m	Princesse Hyman; Guadeloupe	47.55m
Javelin throw	Anisha Gibbons; Guyana	42.54m	Vivica Addison; Barbados	41.92m	Vanessa Greaves; Barbados	41.17m
Heptathlon ^{†}	Shania Myers; Jamaica	5006	Akeela McMaster; British Virgin Islands	4246	Gianna Paul; Trinidad and Tobago	4245

^{†}: Open event for both junior and youth athletes.

=== Boys U-17 (Youth) ===
Event	Gold		Silver		Bronze	
100 metres (+0.5 m/s)	Dwayne Fleming; Antigua and Barbuda	10.72	Gary Card; Jamaica	10.75	Keo Davis; Saint Vincent and the Grenadines	10.77
200 metres (-1.3 m/s)	Ricoy Hunter; Jamaica	22.13	Keo Davis; Saint Vincent and the Grenadines	22.19	Marcinho Rose; Jamaica	22.26
400 metres	Marcinho Rose; Jamaica	48.41	Tahj-Marques White; Jamaica	48.82	Kaiyin Morris; Trinidad and Tobago	49.01
800 metres	Ainsley Brown; Jamaica	1:58.08	Keeran Sriskandarajah; Trinidad and Tobago	1:58.45	Rasheed Pryce; Jamaica	1:58.51
1500 metres	Keeran Sriskandarajah; Trinidad and Tobago	4:10.58	Javon Roberts; Guyana	4:12.54	Yoshane Bowen; Jamaica	4:13.15
3000 metres	Fynn Armstrong; Barbados	9:21.31	Demetrie Meyers; Belize	9:33.42	Tyrone Lawson; Jamaica	9:34.46
110 metres hurdles (91.4 cm) (-1.5 m/s)	Shaquane Gordon; Jamaica	13.61	Jadan Campbell; Jamaica	13.91	Jermahd Huggins; Saint Kitts and Nevis	15.21
400 metres hurdles (84 cm)	Princewel Martin; Jamaica	53.00	Jordan Mowatt; Jamaica	54.40	Jermahd Huggins; Saint Kitts and Nevis	55.57
4 × 100 metres relay	Jamaica; Jadan Campbell; Gary Card; Ricoy Hunter; Shaquane Gordon	41.74	Trinidad and Tobago; Jamario Russell; Daeshaun Cole; Khadeem Ryan; Khareem Solomon	42.77	Cayman Islands; Rashawn Robinson; Jacob Ebanks; Ty Goddard; Jerrell Maize	43.40
4 × 400 metres relay	Jamaica; Zachary Wallace; Ainsley Brown; Princewel Martin; Marcinho Rose	3:17.85	Trinidad and Tobago; Kyle Williams; Dylan Woodruffe; Daeshaun Cole; Kaiyin Morris	3:18.89	Bahamas; Berkley Munnings; Ishmael Rolle; Turmani Skinner; Zion Miller	3:21.35
High jump	Chavez Penn; Jamaica	2.05m	Andrew Stone; Cayman Islands	2.00m	Aaron McKenzie; Jamaica	1.95m
Long jump	Andrew Stone; Cayman Islands	6.76m	Andrew Steele; Trinidad and Tobago	6.61m	Euan Young; Jamaica	6.60m
Triple jump	Chavez Penn; Jamaica	14.63m (w)	Euan Young; Jamaica	14.32m (w)	Jonathan Rogers; Bahamas	13.99m
Shot put (5.0 kg)	Despiro Wray; Jamaica	15.36m	Nathaniel McHardy; Bahamas	15.36m	Only 2 starters	
Discus throw (1.50 kg)	Despiro Wray; Jamaica	48.89m	Only 1 starter			
Javelin throw (700 gr)	Rayvon Telesford; Grenada	62.80m	Addison Alickson James; Dominica	50.17m	Dylan Morin; Martinique	36.41m

=== Girls U-17 (Youth) ===
Event	Gold		Silver		Bronze	
100 metres (+0.5 m/s)	Adaejah Hodge; British Virgin Islands	11.29	Shatalya Dorsett; Bahamas	11.80	Thieanna Lee Terrelonge; Jamaica	11.87
200 metres (-3.0 m/s)	Adaejah Hodge; British Virgin Islands	23.42	Sabrina Dockery; Jamaica	24.25	Thieanna Lee Terrelonge; Jamaica	24.64
400 metres	Abigail Campbell; Jamaica	53.83	Narissa McPherson; Guyana	55.39	Quana Walker; Jamaica	55.65
800 metres	Michelle Smith; U.S. Virgin Islands	2:10.78	Andrene Peart; Jamaica	2:13.07	Attoya Harvey; Guyana	2:14.08
1500 metres	Attoya Harvey; Guyana	4:45.75	Kayleigh Forde; Trinidad and Tobago	4:52.14	Kededra Coombs; Jamaica	4:52.19
100 metres hurdles (76 cm) (-1.8 m/s)	Bryana Davidson; Jamaica	13.50	Michelle Smith; U.S. Virgin Islands	14.31	Jody-Ann Daley; Jamaica	14.45
400 metres hurdles	Michelle Smith; U.S. Virgin Islands	58.61	Jody-Ann Daley; Jamaica	1:02.22	Deandra Harris; Jamaica	1:02.26
4 × 100 metres relay	Jamaica; Bryana Davidson; Camoy Binger; Shemonique Hazle; Thieanna Lee Terrelonge	45.38	Bahamas; Jamiah Nabbie; Nia Wright; Koi Adderley; Shatalya Dorsett	47.13	Trinidad and Tobago; Janae De Gannes; Alexxe Henry; Kaziah Peters; Ayode Simmons	48.19
4 × 400 metres relay	Jamaica; Sabrina Dockery; Quana Walker; Deandra Harris; Abigail Campbell	3:43.59	Bermuda; Madisyn Bobb; S'Nya Cumbermatch; Jaeda Grant; Elise Dickinson	4:03.23	Bahamas; Nya Wright; Shatalya Dorsett; Erin Barr; Koi Adderley	4:04.11
High jump	Daneille Noble; Jamaica	1.73m	Tenique Vincent; Trinidad and Tobago	1.65m	Jah'kyla Morton; British Virgin Islands	1.60m
Long jump	Adaejah Hodge; British Virgin Islands	6.20m (w)	Shemonique Hazle; Jamaica	5.85m	Rohanna Sudlow; Jamaica	5.84m (w)
Triple jump	Sabrina Atkinson; Jamaica	12.00m	Leane Alfred; French Guiana	11.77m	Zoe Adderley; Bahamas	11.45m
Shot put (3.0 kg)	Savianna Joseph; British Virgin Islands	13.54m	Natassia Burrell; Jamaica	13.10m	Terell McCoy; Bahamas	13.00m
Discus throw	Dionjah Shaw; Jamaica	45.32m	Rehanna Biggs; Jamaica	42.41m	Adriana Quamina; Trinidad and Tobago	35.23m
Javelin throw (500 gr)	Dior-Rae Scott; Bahamas	44.57m GR	Kenika Cassar; Trinidad and Tobago	42.86m	Suerena Alexander; Grenada	42.57m

== Medal table ==
Rank	Nation	Gold	Silver	Bronze	Total
1	Jamaica (JAM)	45	29	18	92
2	Bahamas (BAH)	4	6	7	17
3	British Virgin Islands (IVB)	4	2	1	7
4	Trinidad and Tobago (TTO)	2	11	10	23
5	Guyana (GUY)	2	3	2	7
6	U.S. Virgin Islands (ISV)	2	1	0	3
7	Barbados (BAR)	1	4	6	11
8	French Guiana (GUF)	1	2	0	3
9	Cayman Islands (CAY)	1	1	2	4
10	Dominica (DMA)	1	1	0	2
11	Grenada (GRN)	1	0	5	6
12	Antigua and Barbuda (ATG)	1	0	2	3
13	Suriname (SUR)	1	0	1	2
14	Curaçao (CUW)	1	0	0	1
15	Saint Vincent and the Grenadines (VIN)	0	2	3	5
16	Bermuda (BER)	0	1	2	3
17	Belize (BIZ)	0	1	0	1
17	Saint Lucia (LCA)	0	1	0	1
19	Saint Kitts and Nevis (SKN)	0	0	2	2
20	Guadeloupe (GLP)	0	0	1	1
20	Martinique (MTQ)	0	0	1	1
20	Turks and Caicos Islands (TCA)	0	0	1	1
Totals (22 entries)		67	65	64	196
