= 2023 CARIFTA Games =

XLX CARIFTA Games
- Dates: 7–9 April
- Host city: Nassau, Bahamas (The Bahamas)
- Venue: Thomas Robinson Stadium
- Level: U20 and U17
- Events: U20: 37 (incl. 6 open), U17: 31

The 2023 CARIFTA Games took place between 7 and 9 April 2023 at the Thomas Robinson Stadium in Nassau, Bahamas.

== Medal summary ==
=== Boys U-20 ===
Event	Gold		Silver		Bronze	
100 metres (+1.9 m/s)	Davonte Howell; Cayman Islands	10.30	Carlos Brown Jr. Bahamas	10.38	Adam Musgrove; Bahamas	10.44
200 metres (+1.5 m/s)	Malique Smith-Band; Jamaica	20.69	Javorne Dunkley; Jamaica	20.88	Adam Musgrove; Bahamas	20.96
400 metres	Jasauna Dennis; Jamaica	46.43	Delano Kennedy; Jamaica	46.50	Amal Glasgow; Saint Vincent and the Grenadines	47.18
800 metres	Nathan Cumberbatch; Trinidad and Tobago	1:51.34	Favian Gollop; Barbados	1:52.33	Stefan Camejo; Trinidad and Tobago	1:52.92
1500 metres	Ainsley Campbell; Jamaica	4:05.54	Kahzi Sealey; Bermuda	4:06.34	Seon Booker; Guyana	4:08.38
5000 metres ^{†}	Tafari Waldron; Trinidad and Tobago	15:33.38	Kahzi Sealey; Bermuda	15:37.56	Jake Brislane; Bermuda	15:45.84
110 metres hurdles (99 cm) (+2.0 m/s)	Demario Prince; Jamaica	13.37	Otto Laing; Bahamas	13.49	Nikkolia Kennedy; Barbados	14.02
400 metres hurdles	Roshawn Clarke; Jamaica	49.92	Antonio Forbes; Jamaica	51.72	Shimar Bain; Bahamas	52.48
4 × 100 metres relay	Jamaica; Javorne Dunkley; Shaquane Gordon; Demario Prince; DeAndre Daley	39.68	Bahamas; Zachary Evans; Jeremiah Adderley; Zion Campbell; Carlos Brown Jr.	39.78	Trinidad and Tobago; Keone John; Joshua Mascall; Jordan Noel; Michael Jack	40.83
4 × 400 metres relay	Jamaica; Jasauna Dennis; Roshawn Clarke; Delano Kennedy; Malique Smith-Band	3:07.68	Trinidad and Tobago; Cyril Summer; Nakiel Denoon; Joshua Mascall; Nathan Cumberbatch	3:09.97	Grenada; Rickyle Telemaque; Elisha Williams; Jayden Phillip; Taigon Peterkin	3:10.59
High jump	Brandon Pottinger; Jamaica	2.00m	Chavez Penn; Jamaica	2.00m	Jaidi James; Trinidad and Tobago	1.95m
Pole vault ^{†}	Brenden Vanderpool; Bahamas	5.06m GR NR	Jeremiah Felix; Saint Lucia	4.60m	Tyler Cash; Bahamas	4.45m
Long jump	Andrew Stone; Cayman Islands	7.54m	Demario Prince; Jamaica	7.44m	Mateo Smith; Bahamas	7.44m
Triple jump	Jaydon Hibbert; Jamaica	16.11m	Laquan Ellis; Barbados	14.92m	Trevor Hamer; Guyana	14.89m
Shot put (6.0 kg)	Kobe Lawrence; Jamaica	18.55m	Shaiquan Dunn; Jamaica	17.65m	Antwon Hilly Walkin; Turks and Caicos Islands	16.18m
Discus throw (1.75 kg)	Kobe Lawrence; Jamaica	60.27m	Shaiquan Dunn; Jamaica	57.28m	Antwon Hilly Walkin; Turks and Caicos Islands	52.25m
Javelin throw (800 gr)	Kaden Cartwright; Bahamas	64.07m	Dorian Charles; Trinidad and Tobago	61.58m	Cameron Thomas; Grenada	60.12m
Octathlon ^{†}	Courtney Williams; Jamaica	5253	Lavardo Deveaux; Bahamas	5197	Jauza James; Bermuda	4850

^{†}: Open event for both U20 and U17 athletes.

=== Girls U-20 ===
Event	Gold		Silver		Bronze	
100 metres (-1.0 m/s)	Alana Reid; Jamaica	11.17	Alexis James; Jamaica	11.53	Sanaa Frederick; Trinidad and Tobago	11.65
200 metres (+0.9 m/s)	Sanaa Frederick; Trinidad and Tobago	23.60	Kenyatta Grate; British Virgin Islands	24.11	Amari Pratt; Bahamas	24.17
400 metres	Rickianna Russell; Jamaica	51.84	Javonya Valcourt; Bahamas	52.12	Lacarthea Cooper; Bahamas	53.12
800 metres	Michelle Smith; U.S. Virgin Islands	2:09.72	Layla Haynes; Barbados	2:11.90	Victoria Guerrier; Haiti	2:11.99
1500 metres	Layla Haynes; Barbados	4:53.29	Kishay Rowe; Jamaica	4:53.79	JodyAnn Mitchell; Jamaica	4:55.99
3000 metres ^{†}	Kaydeen Johnson; Jamaica	10:41.11	Attoya Harvey; Guyana	10:45.74	Akaya Lightbourne; Bahamas	10:47.01
100 metres hurdles (+0.9 m/s)	Alexis James; Jamaica	13.06 GR	Asharria Ulett; Jamaica	13.24	Nya Browne; Barbados	13.80
400 metres hurdles	Michelle Smith; U.S. Virgin Islands	57.69	Tony-Ann Beckford; Jamaica	58.94	Alliah Baker; Jamaica	59.55
4 × 100 metres relay	Jamaica; Asharria Ulett; Alana Reid; Alexis James; Alliah Baker	44.01	Trinidad and Tobago; Reneisha Andrews; Janae De Gannes; Sole Frederick; Sanaa Frederick	45.35	Bahamas; Shatalya Dorsett; Amari Pratt; Lacarthea Cooper; Quincy Penn	45.55
4 × 400 metres relay	Jamaica; Tony-Ann Beckford; Rickianna Russell; Kacian Powell; Abigail Campbell	3:33.35	Trinidad and Tobago; Sole Frederick; Sanaa Frederick; Keneisha Shelbourne; Natasha Fox	3:44.19	Bahamas; Quincy Penn; Shatalya Dorsett; Melvinique Gibson; Nya Wright	3:47.68
High jump	Torian Caven; Jamaica	1.81m	Deijanae Bruce; Jamaica	1.78m	Keneisha Shelbourne; Trinidad and Tobago	1.75m
Pole vault ^{†}	Naya Jules; Saint Lucia	2.80m	Naima Caprice; Martinique	2.70m	Lou-Anna Pronzola; Martinique	2.60m
Long jump	Jade-Ann Dawkins; Jamaica	6.14m	Janae De Gannes; Trinidad and Tobago	5.93m	Deijanae Bruce; Jamaica	5.78m
Triple jump	Jade-Ann Dawkins; Jamaica	13.05m	Lanaisha Lubin; Bahamas	12.40m	Kayssia Hudson; French Guiana	12.22m
Shot put	Britannia Johnson; Jamaica	14.54m	Britannie Johnson; Jamaica	13.74m	Joy Edward; Saint Lucia	13.53m
Discus throw	Abigail Martin; Jamaica	53.30m	Cedricka Williams; Jamaica	53.08m	Princesse Hyman; Guadeloupe	48.81m
Javelin throw	Anisha Gibbons; Guyana	47.96m	Korann Colet; French Guiana	45.32m	Vanessa Sawyer; Bahamas	43.37m
Heptathlon ^{†}	Sherika Christie; Jamaica	5007	Jahzara Claxton; Saint Kitts and Nevis	4614	Gianna Paul; Trinidad and Tobago	4594

^{†}: Open event for both U20 and U17 athletes.

=== Mixed U-20 ===
Event	Gold		Silver		Bronze	
4 × 400 metres relay	Bahamas; Javonya Valcourt (W); Lacarthea Cooper (W); Turmani Skinner (M); Shimar Bain (M)	3:24.62	Grenada; Cheffonia Houston (W); Jamara Patterson (W); Jayden Phillip (M); Taigon Peterkin (M)	3:27.22	Jamaica; Abigail Campbell (W); Antonio Forbes (M); Breana Brown (W); Tyrese Ebanks (M)	3:29.35

=== Boys U-17 (Youth) ===
Event	Gold		Silver		Bronze	
100 metres (+1.1 m/s)	Tramaine Todd; Jamaica	10.52	Ishmael Rolle; Bahamas	10.62	Ethan Sam; Grenada	10.71
200 metres (+1.9 m/s)	Cayden Smith; Bahamas	21.70	Ethan Sam; Grenada	21.96	Andrew Brown; Bahamas	22.03
400 metres	Nickecoy Bramwell; Jamaica	47.86	Jaylen Bennett; Saint Kitts and Nevis	48.59	Andrew Brown; Bahamas	48.68
800 metres	Javon Roberts; Guyana	1:56.64	Delano Todd; Jamaica	1:57.44	Brandon Leacock; Trinidad and Tobago	1:58.17
1500 metres	Demetire Meyers; Belize	4:11.19	Javon Roberts; Guyana	4:13.63	Joel Morgan; Jamaica	4:13.82
3000 metres	Demetrie Meyers; Belize	9:08.56	Ejay George; Grenada	9:36.82	Love Joseph; Turks and Caicos Islands	9:37.46
110 metres hurdles (91.4 cm) (+0.4 m/s)	Kahiem Carby; Jamaica	13.49	Shakir Lewis; Jamaica	14.20	Quinton Rolle; Bahamas	14.49
400 metres hurdles (84 cm)	Akanye Samuel-Francis; Jamaica	54.14	Deandre Gayle; Jamaica	55.10	Demarco Bennett; Jamaica	55.27
4 × 100 metres relay	Bahamas; Trent Ford; Andrew Brown; Cayden Smith; Ishmael Rolle	41.46	Grenada; Mikael Redhead; Nathan Hillarie; Aidan McIntosh; Ethan Sam	41.95	Trinidad and Tobago; Trevaughn Stewart; Kadeem Chinapoo; Immani Mathew; Jaden Clement	42.51
4 × 400 metres relay	Jamaica; Demarco Bennett; Nickecoy Bramwell; Deandre Gayle; Kenrick Sharpe	3:19.04	Bahamas; Eagan Neely; Andrew Brown; Javanno Bridgewater; Zion Shepherd	3:20.47	Trinidad and Tobago; Jaden Clement; Diyonte Thomas; Brandon Leacock; Makaelan Woods	3:23.74
High jump	Michael Neil; Jamaica	1.95m	Kaleb Campbell; Trinidad and Tobago	1.95m	Joshua Williams; Bahamas	1.90m
Long jump	Immani Mathew; Trinidad and Tobago	7.13m	Aaron Massiah; Barbados	6.49m	Anthony Chin; Cayman Islands	6.48m
Triple jump	Euan Young; Jamaica	14.32m	Aaron Massiah; Jamaica	13.93m	Ezekiel Saul; Bahamas	13.53m
Shot put (5.0 kg)	Ronaldo Anderson; Jamaica	15.52m	Denzel Phillips; Saint Lucia	15.17m	Reuben Bain; Bahamas	13.78m
Discus throw (1.50 kg)	Joseph Salmon; Jamaica	44.67m	Denzel Phillips; Saint Lucia	44.31m	Javontae Smith; Jamaica	43.12m
Javelin throw (700 gr)	Addison Alickson James; Dominica	60.16m	Maliek Francis; Antigua and Barbuda	50.45m	Tristan Carias; Guadeloupe	49.48m

=== Girls U-17 (Youth) ===
Event	Gold		Silver		Bronze	
100 metres (-1.0 m/s)	Jamiah Nabbie; Bahamas	11.67	Naomi London; Saint Lucia	11.72	Alexxe Henry; Trinidad and Tobago	11.81
200 metres (+0.2 m/s)	Jamiah Nabbie; Bahamas	23.67	Naomi London; Saint Lucia	23.72	Natrece East; Jamaica	23.85
400 metres	Tianna Springer; Guyana	53.83	Jody-Ann Daley; Jamaica	55.39	De'cheynelle Thomas; Saint Kitts and Nevis	55.65
800 metres	Alikay Reynolds; Jamaica	2:14.67	Ashlyn Simmons; Barbados	2:16.28	Chanecia Bryan; Barbados	2:16.81
1500 metres	Ashlyn Simmons; Barbados	4:51.65	Dena-Marie Barby; Curaçao	4:52.57	Erin Barr; Bahamas	4:54.09
100 metres hurdles (76 cm) (+0.4 m/s)	Bryana Davidson; Jamaica	13.31	Camoy Binger; Jamaica	13.51	Zsa Zsa Frans; Curaçao	14.26
400 metres hurdles	Jody-Ann Daley; Jamaica	1:01.05	Darvinique Dean; Bahamas	1:02.50	Rhianna Lewis; Jamaica	1:02.61
4 × 100 metres relay	Trinidad and Tobago; Alexxe Henry; Symphony Patrick; Makayla Cupid; Kaori Robley	46.18	Bahamas; Shayann Demeritte; Jamiah Nabbie; Darvinique Dean; Bayli Major	47.13	Bermuda; J'Naz Richards; Pria Wilson; Lashee Jones; Arima Turner	48.19
4 × 400 metres relay	Jamaica; Breana Brown; Jody-Ann Daley; Rosalee Gallimore; Rhianna Lewis	3:34.43	Barbados; Kadia Rock; Ariel Archer; Chanecia Bryan; Aniya Nurse	3:50.49	Bahamas; Bayli Major; Tamia Taylor; Akaree Roberts; Darvinique Dean	3:51.60
High jump	Asia McKay; Jamaica	1.73m	Jah'kyla Morton; British Virgin Islands	1.70m	Shaniqua Williams; Jamaica	1.65m
Long jump	Gerilin Barnes; Antigua and Barbuda	5.60m	Sashana Jones; Jamaica	5.57m	Hilaire Oceane Saint; Guadeloupe	5.54m
Triple jump	Tessa Clamy; Guadeloupe	11.67m	Bayli Major; Bahamas	11.60m	Sabrina Atkinson; Jamaica	11.52m
Shot put (3.0 kg)	Dionjah Shaw; Jamaica	14.48m	Peyton Winter; Trinidad and Tobago	13.66m	Terrell McCoy; Bahamas	13.31m
Discus throw	Dionjah Shaw; Jamaica	44.37m	Clementine Carias; Guadeloupe	32.86m	Danielle Nixon; Bahamas	31.60m
Javelin throw (500 gr)	Kamera Strachan; Bahamas	46.07m GR	Dior-Rae Scott; Bahamas	45.13m	Naya Jules; Saint Lucia	42.92m

== Medal table ==
* Host nation (Bahamas)

Rank	Nation	Gold	Silver	Bronze	Total
1	Jamaica (JAM)	40	22	16	78
2	Bahamas (BAH)*	10	13	23	46
3	Trinidad and Tobago (TTO)	9	10	12	31
4	Saint Kitts and Nevis (SKN)	5	2	4	11
5	Guyana (GUY)	3	2	3	8
6	U.S. Virgin Islands (ISV)	3	0	0	3
7	Barbados (BAR)	2	6	2	10
8	Grenada (GRN)	2	4	4	10
9	Cayman Islands (CAY)	2	0	1	3
10	Belize (BIZ)	2	0	0	2
11	Saint Lucia (LCA)	1	5	2	8
12	Guadeloupe (GLP)	1	2	3	6
13	Antigua and Barbuda (ATG)	1	1	0	2
14	Dominica (DMA)	1	0	0	1
15	Bermuda (BER)	0	4	3	7
16	British Virgin Islands (IVB)	0	3	0	3
17	Martinique (MTQ)	0	2	2	4
18	Saint Vincent and the Grenadines (VIN)	0	2	1	3
19	Curaçao (CUW)	0	1	1	2
19	French Guiana (GUF)	0	1	1	2
21	Turks and Caicos Islands (TCA)	0	0	3	3
22	Haiti (HAI)	0	0	1	1
Totals (22 entries)		82	80	82	244
