= Nathan Cumberbatch =

Trinidad and Tobago athlete

Personal information
- Born: 11 January 2005 (age 21)

Sport
- Sport: Athletics
- Event: Middle-distance running

Achievements and titles
- Personal bests: 800m: 1:45.64 (2026); 1500m: 3:44.55 (2025) NR
Medal record
Men's athletics
Representing Trinidad and Tobago
CARIFTA Games Junior (U20)
Gold medal – first place	2023 Nassau	800m
Silver medal – second place	2022 Kingston	800 m

Nathan Cumberbatch (born 11 January 2005) is a middle-distance runner who competes internationally for Trinidad and Tobago. He won the gold medal over 800 metres at the 2023 CARIFTA Games. In 2025, he set a national record in the 1500 metres.

== Biography ==
Educated at Shorewood High School in Shorewood, Wisconsin, in 2022 he was a silver medalist over 800 metres representing Trinidad and Tobago at the 2022 CARIFTA Games in Kingston, Jamaica.

In 2023, Cumberbatch was the Nike Indoor National 800 m champion. He ran new personal best of 1:50.33 at the Florida Relays in April 2023, and ran a new personal best time of 1:48.20 to win the Brooks PR Invitational boys 800 metres in Renton in June 2023. The time was a Wisconsin high school all-time state record. That year, he won the gold medal in the 800 metres at the 2023 CARIFTA Games in Nassau, The Bahamas.

In April 2025, in his sophomore year at the University of Southern California, Cumberbatch won the 800 m at the Battle on the Bayou meet in Louisiana, running a personal best time of 1:47.70. In May 2025, running for the University of Southern California in Los Angeles, a 3:43.55 time for the 1500 metres run from Cumberbatch was faster than the Trinidad and Tobago national record set by Sheldon Monderoy in 1998.

On 14 February 2026, Cumberbatch ran a personal best for the 800 m of 1:45.64 competing outdoors at the Perth Track Classic in Australia. He ran an indoor national record of 1:46,95 for the 800 m at the 2026 World Athletics Indoor Championships in Toruń, Poland in March 2026. In June, he won the national championship title over 800 metres. In July, he represented Trinidad and Tobago at the 2026 Commonwealth Games in Glasgow.
