= Tina Clayton =

Jamaican sprinter (born 2004)

Personal information
- Nickname: Twin Turbo
- Born: 17 August 2004 (age 22) Westmoreland, Jamaica

Sport
- Country: Jamaica
- Sport: Track and field
- Event: Sprints
- Club: MVP Track Club
- Coached by: Corey Bennett; Stephen Francis

Achievements and titles
- Personal bests: 60 m: 7.02 (Kingston 2023); 100 m: 10.76 (Tokyo 2025); 200 m: 23.02 (Kingston 2026)
Medal record
Women's athletics
Representing Jamaica
World Championships
Silver medal – second place	2025 Tokyo	100 m
Silver medal – second place	2025 Tokyo	4 × 100 m relay
World Ultimate Championship
Second place	2026 Budapest	Mixed 4 × 100 m relay
World Relays
Gold medal – first place	2026 Gaborone	Mixed 4 × 100 m relay
Bronze medal – third place	2025 Guangzhou	4 × 100 m relay
Diamond League
First place	2026 Brussels	100 m
World U20 Championships
Gold medal – first place	2021 Nairobi	100 m
Gold medal – first place	2021 Nairobi	4 × 100 m relay
Gold medal – first place	2022 Cali	100 m
Gold medal – first place	2022 Cali	4 × 100 m relay
CARIFTA Games (U20)
Gold medal – first place	2022 Kingston	100 m
Gold medal – first place	2022 Kingston	4 × 100 m relay
NACAC U18 Championships
Gold medal – first place	2021 San José	100 m
Gold medal – first place	2021 San José	4 × 100 m relay

Tina Clayton (born 17 August 2004) is a Jamaican sprinter. She won gold medals for both the 100 metres and 4 × 100 m relay at both the 2021 and 2022 World Under-20 Championships. Clayton set a championship record in her individual event in 2022, while Jamaican women's relay team broke the world U20 record on both occasions with times of 42.94 s and 42.59 s respectively.

Tina has a twin sister, Tia Clayton, who ran the anchor leg of those world record relays. Together, they are referred to as the "Twin Turbo."

== Biography ==
Tina Clayton attended Edwin Allen High School in Clarendon, Jamaica. She and her sister first became national stars under the training program of renown Jamaican coach Michael Dyke.

== Career ==
Because of the COVID-19 pandemic, the CARIFTA Games were postponed for 2020 and 2021. During her time partaking in the ISSA Boys and Girls National High School Championships, she won both the 100 metres and 4 × 100 metres relay in different age classes and helped Edwin Allen High to overall Champs victories. In 2022, Tina left high school and went directly to the professional league.

=== 2021 ===
She won the girls 100 m and 4 × 100 m gold medals at the 2021 NACAC U18 Championships.

That same year, she achieved success at her first U20 World Championships in Nairobi, Kenya winning gold in both the 100 m in 11.09 (-0.6) and the 4 × 100 m relay (2021 World Athletics U20 Championships).

=== 2022 ===
Clayton took the U20 100 m title at the 2022 CARIFTA Games in 11.22 seconds ahead of her twin sister, Tia Clayton, who earned the silver medal in 11.30. Then, the Jamaican women's 4 × 100 m relay team set a world U20 record time 42.58 which was not ratified because one of the four members of the quartet of Serena Cole, Tina Clayton, Brianna Lyston and Tia Clayton was not drug tested post race. According to JADCO, they administered the test the previous day, but WA rejected this explanation.

Still, the 42.58 is the official CARIFTA games record. Months later at the 2022 World Athletics U20 Championships - Women's 4 × 100 metres relay in Cali, Colombia, the quartet of Serena Cole, Tina Clayton, Kerrica Hill, and Tia Clayton again broke the junior women's relay record, in a time of 42.59. This new time got ratified by the World Athletics governing body. At the same championships, Clayton won the 100 m gold in a CR 10.95 while her peer from school Serena Cole took silver for the quinella.

=== 2023 ===
This time was spent mostly adjusting and acclimating to the new training regiment at MVP.

=== 2024 ===
Clayton aimed to go to the 2024 Summer Olympics in Paris, but did not participate due to injury. At the JAAA National Trials in 2024, she placed 6th in the semifinal and did not advance to the final. However, her sister made the team.

=== 2025 ===
After missing the Olympics, Tina was determined to make the 2025 World Athletics Championships team to Tokyo, Japan by crossing the line first in 10.81, (+0.1) at the National trials, her first national senior title. Then, she went on to win silver in both the 100 metres (10.76 PB, +0.3) and 4 × 100 metres relay (41.79) at the global competition.

Also in 2025, she won a bronze medal in the women's 4 × 100 m relay in 42.33 at the 2025 World Athletics Relays in China.

=== 2026 ===
Clayton started the season competing in a few local meets for the outdoor 60 metres and 200 metres.

As part of the Jamaican mixed 4 × 100 metres relay squad, along with Ackeem Blake, Kadrian Goldson, and sister Tia Clayton, she won gold breaking the world record twice, first in the heats, then the finals in 39.99 and 39.62 respectively. On 9 May, at the JAAA Puma meet in Kingston, Clayton finished second behind her sister in a 10.98 100 metres season opener.

On 5 September, she became the fifth Jamaican woman to claim the women's 100 m Diamond League title and trophy beating a field that includes the likes of 2023 World Champion Sha'carri Richardson and Amy Hunt. She dedicated the victory to her late coach Stephen "Frano" Francis who passed away on 4 July 2026.

To close the season, she ran the second leg for the Jamaican mixed 4 × 100 m relay team that earned silver in 39.72 at the inaugural 2026 World Athletics Ultimate Championship in Budapest, Hungary.

== Athletics achievements ==
Information from her World Athletics profile unless otherwise noted.

=== Personal bests ===
Type	Distance	Time (s)	Wind (m/s)	Venue	Date	Notes
Individual events
Outdoor	60 metres	7.02	+2.0	Kingston, Jamaica	25 February 2023	
Outdoor	100 metres	10.76	+0.3	Tokyo, Japan	14 September 2025	
Outdoor	150 metres	17.00	+1.4	Miramar, United States	4 April 2026	
Outdoor	200 metres	23.02	+0.5	Kingston, Jamaica	19 April 2026	
Outdoor	300 metres	39.61	—N/a	Miramar, United States	5 April 2025	
Outdoor	Team events					
Outdoor	4 × 100 metres relay	41.79	—N/a	Tokyo, Japan	21 September 2025	
Outdoor	Mixed 4 × 100 metres relay	39.62	—N/a	Gaborone, Botswana	3 May 2026	

=== International competitions ===
Representing Jamaica
Year	Competition	Venue	Position	Event	Time	Notes
2021	NACAC U18 Championships	San José, Costa Rica	1st	100 m	11.17	
2021	NACAC U18 Championships	San José, Costa Rica	1st	4 × 100 m relay	45.49	
2021	World U20 Championships	Nairobi, Kenya	1st	100 m	11.09	
2021	World U20 Championships	Nairobi, Kenya	1st	4 × 100 m relay	42.94	WU20R
2022	CARIFTA Games	Kingston, Jamaica	1st	100 m	11.22	
2022	CARIFTA Games	Kingston, Jamaica	1st	4 × 100 m relay	42.58	CR (Note: World U20 record time not ratified because one of the four members of the quartet of Serena Cole, Tina Clayton, Brianna Lyston and Tia Clayton was not drug tested post race. According to JADCO, they administered the test the previous day, but WA rejected this explanation.)
2022	World U20 Championships	Cali, Colombia	1st	100 m	10.95	CR
2022	World U20 Championships	Cali, Colombia	1st	4 × 100 m relay	42.59	WU20R (Note: Later, they broke the U20 WR again, and WA ratified it.)
2025	World Relays	Guangzhou, China	3rd	4 × 100 m relay	42.33	
2025	World Championships	Tokyo, Japan	2nd	100 m	10.76	PB
2025	World Championships	Tokyo, Japan	2nd	4 × 100 m relay	41.79	
2026	World Relays	Gaborone, Botswana	1st	Mixed 4 × 100 m relay	39.62	WR
2026	World Ultimate Championship	Budapest, Hungary	5th	100 m	10.94	
2026	World Ultimate Championship	Budapest, Hungary	2nd	Mixed 4 × 100 m relay	39.72	

=== National championships and competitions ===
Year	Competition	Venue	Position	Event	Time	Wind (m/s)	Notes
2019	Jamaican U18 Championships	Kingston	2nd	100 m	11.51	+0.8	
2021	Jamaican U20 Championships	Kingston	1st	100 m	11.25	0.0	
2021	Jamaican U20 Championships	Kingston	1st	200 m	23.61	-1.7	
2022	Jamaican U20 Championships	Kingston	1st	100 m	10.96	+1.0	
2023	Jamaican Championships	Kingston	10th (sf)	100 m	11.44	-0.9	
2024	Jamaican Championships	Kingston	12th (sf)	100 m	11.26	+1.5	
2025	Jamaican Championships	Kingston	1st	100 m	10.81	+0.1	
2026	Jamaican Championships	Kingston	2nd	100 m	10.85	-0.3	
