= Sanaa Frederick =

Trinidad and Tobago athlete (born 2006)

Personal information
- Nationality: Trinidad and Tobago
- Born: 3 January 2006 (age 20)

Sport
- Sport: Athletics
- Event: Sprint

Achievements and titles
- Personal best: 100m: 11.38 (2024)
Medal record
Women's athletics
Representing Trinidad and Tobago
Central American and Caribbean Games
Silver medal – second place	2023 San Salvador	4×100 m relay
CARIFTA Games (U20)
Gold medal – first place	2023 Nassau	200 m
Bronze medal – third place	2023 Nassau	100 m
Silver medal – second place	2023 Nassau	4×400 m relay
Silver medal – second place	2023 Nassau	4×100 m relay
Silver medal – second place	2024 St George's	4x100 m relay
Silver medal – second place	2024 St George's	4x400 m relay
Commonwealth Youth Games
Bronze medal – third place	2023 Trinbago	100 m
Bronze medal – third place	2023 Trinbago	4x100 m mixed relay

Sanna Frederick (born 3 January 2006) is a sprinter who runs for Trinidad and Tobago. She competed at the 2024 Summer Olympics.

== Early life ==
She attended Druid Hills High School in Atlanta, Georgia. She agreed to join the University of Georgia on scholarship in November 2023.

== Career ==
Competing at the 2023 CARIFTA Games Saana won the 200m title and a bronze medal in the 100m. She also won silver medals in both sprint relay races.

She won silver with the women’s 4 × 100 m team at the 2023 Central American and Caribbean Games in El Salvador and won bronze in the Girls 100m finals and won bronze in the mixed 4 × 100 m at the 2023 Commonwealth Youth Games hosted at the Hasely Crawford Stadium.

At the 2024 CARIFTA Games she won silver with the Trinidad and Tobago 4 × 100 m relay team and took another silver medal in the 4 × 400 m relay.

On 8 August 2024, she ran as part of the Trinidad and Tobago 4 × 100 m relay team at the 2024 Summer Olympics in Paris.

== Personal life ==
Her twin sister Sole Frederick is also a sprinter. In March 2024, the sisters signed a Name, Image and Likeness (NIL) deal with Adidas.
