= Malique Smith-Band =

British sprinter (born 2004)

Personal information
- Born: 25 May 2004 (age 22) London, England

Sport
- Sport: Athletics
- Event: Sprint

Achievements and titles
- Personal bests: 60 m: 6.70 (Lubbock, 2025); 100 m: 10.46 (Gainesville, 2024); 200 m: 20.69 (Nassau, 2023); 400 m: 45.68 (Birmingham, 2026)
Medal record
Men's athletics
Representing Great Britain
European Championships
| Silver medal – second place | 2026 Birmingham | 4 × 400 m relay |
Representing Jamaica
CARIFTA Games Junior (U20)
| Gold medal – first place | 2023 Nassau | 200 m |

Malique Smith-Band (born 25 May 2004) is a British sprinter. Born in London, prior to 2025, he represented Jamaica. He won a silver medal with the Great Britain men's 4 × 400 metres team at the 2026 European Championships.

== Early life ==
Smith-Band was born in London, England before moving to Jamaica in childhood. He was educated at Manchester High School in Jamaica prior to transferring to Jamaica College in Kingston, Jamaica. In 2023, he committed to attend the University of Florida.

== Career ==
He won the Under-20 boys’ 200 m final at the Carifta trials, and ran a new personal best time of 46.66 seconds for the 400 metres in March 2023. That month, he won won the Class One boys' 200 metres at the Jamaican Boys and Girls’ Athletics Championships. The following month, he won the gold medal in the 200m in a new personal best time of 20.68 seconds at the Under-20 boys event at the 2023 CARIFTA Games in Nassau, The Bahamas.

Alongside Jevaughn Powell, Wanya McCoy and Robert Gregory, he ran in the 4 × 100 m Relay at the 2024 NCAA Outdoor Championships for the University of Florida as part of the team which ran the fifth-best overall time in Florida program history in the semi-final, before placing fourth in the final in Eugene, Oregon. The following year, he ran for the Florida Gators again at the 2025 NCAA Outdoor Championships as his 4 × 100 m team qualified for the final. In May 2026, he was part of the Florida 4 × 400 m relay team that placed second at the SEC Championships. In June, he reached the final of the 400 metres at the 2026 British Championships, running a personal best 45.68 seconds to place sixth overall. He was named in the British relay team for the 2026 European Athletics Championships in Birmingham for his senior British international debut, running in the opening round of the men's 4 × 400 metres relay at the championships with the team going on to win the silver medal in the final.

== Personal life ==
One of three siblings, when he was a young runner his mother worked as a nail technician in Mandeville in Manchester Parish, Jamaica. From 18 June 2025, he changed his national representation from Jamaica to the country of his birth, Great Britain, with eligibility to represent Great Britain in international competitions from April 10, 2026, in accordance with World Athletics regulations.
