= Shaiquan Dunn =

Jamaican athlete (born 2005)

Personal information
- Nationality: Jamaican
- Born: Shaiquan Selbourne Dunn; 29 March 2005 (age 21)

Sport
- Sport: Athletics
- Events: Shot put, Discus throw
Medal record
Men's athletics
Representing Jamaica
CARIFTA Games (U20)
Gold medal – first place	2024 St George's	Shot put
Gold medal – first place	2024 St George's	Discus throw
Silver medal – second place	2023 Nassau	Shot put
Silver medal – second place	2023 Nassau	Discus throw

Shaiquan Selbourne Dunn (born 29 March 2005) is a Jamaican shot putter and discus thrower. He became Jamaican national champion in the shot put at the 2025 Jamaican Athletics Championships.

== Early life ==
He attended St Jago High School before attending Jamaica College from the start of the 2023–24 academic year.

== Career ==
He was a silver medalist in both the shot put and discus throw at the 2023 CARIFTA Games in April 2023. In July 2023, he won the Under-20 boys' discus throw and shot put competitions at the National Senior and Junior Championships at the National Stadium in Kingston, Jamaica.

He was a winner in both the discus and shot put at the 2024 ISSA/GraceKennedy Boys and Girls’ Athletics Championships and also won gold medals in both events at the 2024 CARIFTA Games in St. George's, Grenada. In June 2024, he won the Jamaican U20 title at the 2024 Jamaican Junior and Senior Championships in the shot put.

He was a finalist in the shot put at the 2024 World Athletics U20 Championships in Lima, Peru having qualified with a throw of 19.53 metres, before placing ninth in the final, in August 2024. He also finished seventh in the final of the discus throw at the championships, with a best throw in the final of 59.79 metres.

He won his first senior national title when he won the shot put at the 2025 Jamaican Athletics Championships in Kingston, with a throw of 18.33 metres.
