= Habiba Harris =

Jamaican athlete

Personal information
- Nationality: Jamaican
- Born: 26 September 2005 (age 21)

Sport
- Sport: Athletics
- Event: Sprint

Achievements and titles
- Personal best: 100 m hurdles: 12.62 (Lexington, 2025)
Medal record
Women's athletics
Representing Jamaica
CARIFTA Games (U20)
Gold medal – first place	2024 St George's	100 m hurdles
Gold medal – first place	2024 St George's	4x100 m relay

Habiba Harris (born 26 September 2005) is a Jamaican hurdler.

== Early life ==
Harris attended St. Elizabeth Technical High School in Jamaica.

== Career ==
She set a lifetime best of 12.96 seconds for the 100 metres hurdles at the Jamaica Carifta Trials in March 2024 (+1.9 m/s), her first time under-13 seconds for the event. This improved upon her previous best of 13.35, which she recorded on March 12, 2023, winning the same event, but had missed the 2023 CARIFTA Games through injury. She went on to become the under-20 champion at the 2024 CARIFTA Games, and also won gold in the women's 4 x 100 metres relay at the Games. She competed for Jamaica at the 2024 World Athletics U20 Championships in Lima, Peru.

Harris joined the University of Florida in January 2025 under the guidance of coach Mike Holloway but did not compete in the indoor season. She made her collegiate debut with a 13.05-second win at the FSU Relays in Tallahassee.

She lowered her personal best to 12.85 at the Florida Relays in early April 2025, and also recorded a wind-assisted 12.69 (+2.1 m/s) at that same meeting. She ran a personal best of 12.62 seconds at the SEC Championships in the preliminary round. Harris then won the women's 100m hurdles title in 12.75 seconds at the 2025 SEC Championships.
