= 2026 World Athletics Ultimate Championship – Women's 100 metres =

Women's 100 metres at the 2026 World Athletics Ultimate Championship
- Venue: National Athletics Centre
- Location: Budapest, Hungary
- Dates: 12 September 2026 (semi-finals & final)
- Competitors: 17 from 9 nations
- Winning time: 10.62 s

Champion
- Melissa Jefferson-Wooden; United States

The women's 100 metres was held over two rounds at the 2026 World Athletics Ultimate Championship at the National Athletics Centre in Budapest, Hungary on 12 September 2026. It was the first time the World Ultimate Championship is held. Athletes qualified by wildcard or by their world ranking.

== Background ==
Global records before the 2026 World Athletics Ultimate Championship
Record	Time	Athlete (nation)	Location	Date
World record	10.49	Florence Griffith Joyner (USA)	Indianapolis, United States	16 July 1988
World lead	10.63	Adaejah Hodge (IVB)	Eugene, United States	11 June 2026

Area records before the 2026 World Athletics Ultimate Championship
Record	Time	Athlete (nation)	Location	Date
African record	10.72	Marie-Josée Ta Lou (CIV)	Fontvieille, Monaco	10 August 2022
Asian record	10.79	Xuemei Li (CHN)	Shanghai, China	18 October 1997
European record	10.73	Christine Arron (FRA)	Budapest, Hungary	19 August 1998
North, Central American, and Caribbean record	10.49	Florence Griffith Joyner (USA)	Indianapolis, United States	16 July 1988
Oceanian record	10.93	Zoe Hobbs (NZL)	Glasgow, United Kingdom	28 July 2026
South American record	10.91	Rosângela Santos (BRA)	London, United Kingdom	6 August 2017

== Qualification ==
For the 100 metres, seventeen athletes qualified, up to three by wildcard for winners of the event at the 2024 Summer Olympic, the 2025 World Athletics Championships, or the 2026 Diamond League final and the others by their position at the World Athletics Rankings for the event on 3 September 2026.

== Results ==
=== Semi-finals ===
The semi-finals were held on 12 September at 19:04 (UTC+2). First 4 of each heat (Q) qualified to the final.

==== Heat 1 ====
Place	Lane	Athlete	Nation	Time	Notes
1	5	Melissa Jefferson-Wooden	United States	10.73	Q
2	6	Sha'Carri Richardson	United States	10.75	Q, SB
3	8	Lavanya Williams	Jamaica	11.02 [.019]	Q
4	4	Amy Hunt	Great Britain	11.02 [.020]	Q
5	1	Jodean Williams	Jamaica	11.16	
6	3	Zaynab Dosso	Italy	11.26 [.252]	
7	2	Audrey Leduc	Canada	11.26 [.258]	
8	9	Boglárka Takács	Hungary	11.27 [.264]	
9	7	Zoe Hobbs	New Zealand	11.27 [.267]	
				Wind: (+0.1 m/s)	

==== Heat 2 ====
Place	Lane	Athlete	Nation	Time	Notes
1	5	Julien Alfred	Saint Lucia	10.73	Q
2	4	Jonielle Smith	Jamaica	10.94	Q
3	7	Tina Clayton	Jamaica	10.98	Q
4	8	Patrizia Van der Weken	Luxembourg	11.08	Q
5	3	Tamari Davis	United States	11.10	
6	6	Brianna Lyston	Jamaica	11.18	
7	9	Cambrea Sturgis	United States	11.21	
8	2	Sade McCreath	Canada	11.39	
				Wind: (±0.0 m/s)	

=== Final ===
The final was held on 12 September at 20:38 (UTC+2).

Place	Lane	Athlete	Nation	Time	Notes
1st place, gold medalist(s)	4	Melissa Jefferson-Wooden	United States	10.62	WL
2	5	Julien Alfred	Saint Lucia	10.74	
3	6	Sha'Carri Richardson	United States	10.76	
4	7	Jonielle Smith	Jamaica	10.94 [.931]	
5	3	Tina Clayton	Jamaica	10.94 [.932]	
6	9	Patrizia Van der Weken	Luxembourg	11.06	
7	8	Lavanya Williams	Jamaica	11.07	
8	2	Amy Hunt	Great Britain	11.09	
				Wind: (−0.2 m/s)	
