= 2024 CARIFTA Games =

XLXI CARIFTA Games
- Dates: 30 March – 1 April
- Host city: St. George's (Grenada)
- Venue: Kirani James Athletic Stadium
- Level: U20 and U17
- Events: U20: 37 (incl. 6 open), U17: 31

The 2024 CARIFTA Games took place between 30 March and 1 April 2024 at the Kirani James Athletic Stadium in St. George's, Grenada.

== Medal summary ==
=== Boys U-20 ===
Event	Gold		Silver		Bronze	
100 metres (+0.5 m/s)	Davonte Howell; Cayman Islands	10.15	Jaiden Reid; Cayman Islands	10.34	Javorne Dunkley; Jamaica	10.34
200 metres (+1.8 m/s)	Gary Card; Jamaica	20.60	Aragorn Straker; Barbados	20.76	Davonte Howell; Cayman Islands	20.90
400 metres	Malachi Austin; Guyana	46.35	Marcinho Rose; Jamaica	46.59	Joshiem Sylvester; Grenada	46.93
800 metres	Kemarrio Bygrave; Jamaica	1:51.43	Deangelo Brown; Grenada	1:52.81	Keeran Sriskandarajah; Trinidad and Tobago	1:52.91
1500 metres	Kemarrio Bygrave; Jamaica	3:58.10	Jaquan Coke; Jamaica	3:58.38	Jake Brislane; Bermuda	3:58.83
5000 metres ^{†}	Tafari Waldron; Trinidad and Tobago	15:01.60	Jake Brislane; Bermuda	15:42.42	Omare Thompson; Trinidad and Tobago	16:03.43
110 metres hurdles (99.1 cm) (+2.1 m/s)	Shaquane Gordon; Jamaica	13.15	Daniel Beckford; Jamaica	13.25	Lizheng Zhuang; Curaçao	13.94
400 metres hurdles	Shamer Blake; Jamaica	51.21	Princewell Martin; Jamaica	51.34	Dorian Charles; Trinidad and Tobago	52.70
4 × 100 metres relay	Trinidad and Tobago; Che Wickham; Mikhail Byer; Hakeem Chinapoo; Dylan Woodruffe	40.45	Jamaica; Javorne Dunkley; Raheem Pinnock; Gary Card; Johan-Ramaldo Smythe	40.55	Grenada; Shaquane Toussaint; Emilio Bishop; Taigon Peterkin; Samuel Green	40.71
4 × 400 metres relay	Jamaica; Kemarrio Bygrave; Marcinho Rose; Javaughn Pinnock; Jaquan Coke	3:10.58	Trinidad and Tobago; Keone John; Jaden Clement; Dashaun Lezama; Kyrell Thomas	3:11.10	Guyana; Malachi Austin; Jaheel Cornette; Jamol Sullivan; Dh Neilson Gill	3:14.05
High jump	Chavez Penn; Jamaica	2.13 m	Timothy Greenidge; Grenada	2.05 m	Bernard Kemp; Bahamas; Shamar Davis; Bahamas	1.95 m
Pole vault ^{†}	Brenden Vanderpool; Bahamas	5.30 m CR, NR	Tyler Cash; Bahamas	4.45 m	Lucas Ledoux; Martinique	4.10 m
Long jump	Rickoy Hunter; Jamaica	7.48 m	Bernard Kemp; Bahamas	7.40 m	Teon Haynes; Barbados	7.32 m
Triple jump	Chavez Penn; Jamaica	15.64 m	Romaine Lewis; Jamaica	15.10 m	Rollie Hanna; Bahamas	14.85 m
Shot put (6.0 kg)	Shaiquan Dunn; Jamaica	18.89 m	Jaylon Calder; Grenada	17.74 m	Deandre Bristol; Grenada	16.99 m
Discus throw (1.75 kg)	Shaiquan Dunn; Jamaica	61.47 m	Chad Hendricks; Jamaica	58.73 m	Antwon Hilly Walkin; Turks and Caicos Islands	52.77 m
Javelin throw	Kaden Cartwright; Bahamas	67.34 m	Rayvohn Telesford; Grenada	65.57 m	Addison Alickson James; Dominica	65.50 m
Octathlon ^{†}	Kenny Moxey Jr. Bahamas	5455 pts	Jermahd Huggins; Saint Kitts and Nevis	5269 pts	Mattias Serin; Guadeloupe	5167 pts

^{†}: Open event for both U20 and U17 athletes.

=== Girls U-20 ===
Event	Gold		Silver		Bronze	
100 metres (+0.3 m/s)	Sabrina Dockery; Jamaica	11.26	Theianna Terrelonge; Jamaica	11.32	Geolyna Dowdye; Antigua and Barbuda	11.64
200 metres (+3.0 m/s)	Shanoya Douglas; Jamaica	23.03	Sole Frederick; Trinidad and Tobago	23.07	Sabrina Dockery; Jamaica	23.13
400 metres	Tianna Springer; Guyana	52.31	Abigail Campbell; Jamaica	52.85	Shanque Williams; Jamaica	53.03
800 metres	Michelle Smith; U.S. Virgin Islands	2:06.18	Victoria Guerrier; Haiti	2:07.45	Monique Stewart; Jamaica	2:07.56
1500 metres	Rickeisha Simms; Jamaica	4:31.94	Kaydeen Johnson; Jamaica	4:32.49	Kaleigh Forde; Trinidad and Tobago	4:41.71
3000 metres ^{†}	Kaydeen Johnson; Jamaica	10:04.44	Ashara Frater; Jamaica	10:24.83	Attoya Harvey; Guyana	10:36.59
100 metres hurdles (+2.4 m/s)	Habiba Harris; Jamaica	12.93	Briana Campbell; Jamaica	13.11	Sofia Swindell; U.S. Virgin Islands	13.95
400 metres hurdles	Michelle Smith; U.S. Virgin Islands	56.28	Kelly Ann Carr; Jamaica	57.02	Aaliyah Mullings; Jamaica	59.80
4 × 100 metres relay	Jamaica; Habiba Harris; Theianna Terrelonge; Briana Campbell; Shanoya Douglas	43.63	Trinidad and Tobago; Symphony Patrick; Sanna Frederick; Sole Frederick; Alexxe Henry	44.43	Bahamas; Shatalya Dorsett; Bayli Major; Nya Wright; Shayann Demeritte	45.40
4 × 400 metres relay	Jamaica; Abigail Campbell; Shanque Williams; Kitania Headley; Shanoya Douglas	3:34.69	Trinidad and Tobago; Kadija Pickering; Sanna Frederick; Kaziah Peters; Janae De Gannes	3:47.51	Barbados; Kadia Rock; Ariel Archer; Ashlyn Simmons; Layla Haynes	3:48.21
High jump	Rasheda Samuels; Jamaica	1.78 m	Dejanae Bruce; Jamaica	1.76 m	Keneisha Shelbourne; Trinidad and Tobago	1.70 m
Pole vault ^{†}	Anaiah Rolle; Bahamas; Naya Jules; Saint Lucia	2.90 m			Alexandra Johnson; Saint Lucia	2.85 m
Long jump	Janae De Gannes; Trinidad and Tobago	6.50 m	Rohanna Sudlow; Jamaica	6.30 m	Lanaisha Lubin; Bahamas	5.90 m
Triple jump	Richelle Stanley; Jamaica	12.58 m	Keneisha Shelbourne; Trinidad and Tobago	12.49 m (w)	Dejanae Bruce; Jamaica	12.20 m
Shot put	Kimeka Smith; Jamaica	13.68 m	Annae Mackey; Bahamas	13.58 m	Brianna Smith; Cayman Islands	12.86 m
Discus throw	Jackie Henrianne Pri Hyman; Guadeloupe	55.06 m CR	Dionjah Shaw; Jamaica	50.26 m	Najhada Seymoure; Jamaica	48.82 m
Javelin throw	Tasha Stubbs; Bahamas	50.94 m	Vanessa Sawyer; Bahamas	43.03 m	Alliah Gittens; Grenada	42.33 m
Heptathlon ^{†}	Kimeka Smith; Jamaica	4699 pts	Clémentine Carias; Guadeloupe	4699 pts	Aaliyah Evans; Bahamas	4181 pts

^{†}: Open event for both U20 and U17 athletes.

=== Mixed U-20 ===
Event	Gold		Silver		Bronze	
4 × 400 metres relay	Guyana; Malachi Austin; Narissa McPherson; Dh Neilson Gill; Tianna Springer	3:23.51 CR	Grenada; Elisha Williams; Joshiem Sylvester; Cheffonia Houston; Kemisha Dominique	3:29.19	Jamaica; Princewell Martin; Rickeisha Simms; Paul Henry; Britannia Bailey	3:30.42

=== Boys U-17 (Youth) ===
Event	Gold		Silver		Bronze	
100 metres (-0.1 m/s)	Nyron Wade; Jamaica	10.43	Kadeem Chinapoo; Trinidad and Tobago	10.59	Malike Nugent; Jamaica	10.74
200 metres (+0.9 m/s)	Kadeem Chinapoo; Trinidad and Tobago	21.78	Oshane Jervis; Jamaica	22.16	Tiondre Frett; British Virgin Islands	22.18
400 metres	Nickecoy Bramwell; Jamaica	47.27 CR	Kemron Mathlyn; Grenada	47.96	Eagan Neely; Bahamas	48.16
800 metres	Keandre Kelly; Jamaica	1:56.31	Kaidon Persaud; Guyana	1:56.53	Alejandro Palmer; Jamaica	1:58.05
1500 metres	Shemar Green; Jamaica	4:11.91	Wyndel Beyde; Aruba	4:12.80	Sekani Brown; Jamaica	4:15.21
3000 metres	Demetrie Meyers; Belize	9:05.86	Wyndel Beyde; Aruba	9:21.30	Isaiah Alder; Trinidad and Tobago	9:29.35
110 metres hurdles (91.4 cm) (+1.8 m/s)	Michael Dwyer; Jamaica	13.81	Jahcario Wilson; Bahamas	13.94	Robert Miller; Jamaica	13.97
400 metres hurdles (84 cm)	Robert Miller; Jamaica	52.19	Akanye Samuel-Francis; Saint Kitts and Nevis	52.88	Fransico Williams; Jamaica	53.19
4 × 100 metres relay	Jamaica; Nyron Wade; Malike Nugent; Byron Walker; Oshane Jervis	41.30	Trinidad and Tobago; Cameron Nathaniel-Powell; Hakeem Chinapoo; Shane Camejo; Kaeden Herbert	41.53	Bahamas; Ishmael Rolle; Everette Fraser; Branden Mackey; Kion Burrows	42.30
4 × 400 metres relay	Jamaica; Fransico Williams; Robert Miller; Keandre Kelly; Nickecoy Bramwell	3:18.43	Trinidad and Tobago; Makaelan Woods; Shezlon Gordon; Michal Paul; Khordae Lewis	3:21.24	Grenada; Kemron Mathlyn; Kimol Murray; Josh Thomas; Adriel Mitchell	3:21.92
High jump	Joshua Williams; Bahamas	2.00 m	Claudius Burrows; Bahamas	1.95 m	Tyrique Vincent; Trinidad and Tobago	1.90 m
Long jump	Joshua Williams; Bahamas	7.03 m	Tyrique Vincent; Trinidad and Tobago	7.00 m	Rodeeki Walters; Jamaica	6.97 m
Triple jump	Chrystophe Calliste; Grenada	14.67 m	Amani Phillips; Jamaica	14.18 m	Davon Davis; Bahamas	14.16 m
Shot put (5.0 kg)	Javontae Smith; Jamaica	18.80 m CR	Jayden Walcott; Barbados	15.37 m	Jaylen Stuart; Bahamas	15.28 m
Discus throw (1.50 kg)	Javontae Smith; Jamaica	52.71 m	Kamari Kennedy; Jamaica	50.84 m	Mathéo Gaspard-Belia; Guadeloupe	43.54 m
Javelin throw (700 gr)	Maliek Francis; Antigua and Barbuda	68.84 m CR	Jaheem Clarke; Saint Kitts and Nevis	56.09 m	Delron John; Grenada	54.70 m

=== Girls U-17 (Youth) ===
Event	Gold		Silver		Bronze	
100 metres (? m/s)	Athaleyha Hinckson; Guyana	11.44	Adora Campbell; Jamaica	11.52	Aniya Nurse; Barbados	11.76
200 metres (+0.9 m/s)	Natrece East; Jamaica	23.74	Athaleyha Hinckson; Guyana	23.85	Tyra Fenton; Antigua and Barbuda	23.97
400 metres	Nastassia Fletcher; Jamaica	54.32	Keyezra Thomas; Bahamas	54.59	Tyra Fenton; Antigua and Barbuda	54.89
800 metres	Kevongaye Fowler; Jamaica	2:16.97	Alikay Reynolds; Jamaica	2:17.02	Annalisa Brown; Grenada	2:18.75
1500 metres	Dallia Fairweather; Jamaica	4:45.86	Alikay Reynolds; Jamaica	4:46.14	Shian Lewis; Trinidad and Tobago	4:48.58
100 metres hurdles (76 cm) (-0.7 m/s)	Malayia Duncan; Jamaica	13.63	Jenna-Marie Thomas; Trinidad and Tobago	13.74	Zsa-Zsa Frans; Curaçao	14.21
400 metres hurdles	Nastassia Fletcher; Jamaica	60.10	Darvinique Dean; Bahamas	60.66	Jenna-Marie Thomas; Trinidad and Tobago	61.03
4 × 100 metres relay	Jamaica; Natrece East; Adora Campbell; Natrece East; Poshannalee Blake	45.36	Bahamas; Darvinique Dean; Alexis Roberts; Keyezra Thomas; Khylee Wallace	46.28	Trinidad and Tobago; Jenniah McLaren; Xiah Tobias; Makayla Cupid; Tianna Richardson	47.49
4 × 400 metres relay	Jamaica; Britannia Bailey; Nastassia Fletcher; Kevongaye Fowler; Tresha Lee Sutherland	3:41.84	Bahamas; Darvinique Dean; Alexis Roberts; Alexandria Komolafe; Darvinique Dean	3:47.13	Trinidad and Tobago; Kyah Hyson; Tenique Vincent; Shian Lewis; Jenna-Marie Thomas	3:54.49
High jump	Zavien Bernard; Jamaica	1.71 m	Alexandria Komolafe; Bahamas	1.71 m	Tenique Vincent; Trinidad and Tobago	1.68 m
Long jump	J'kaiyah Rolle; Bahamas	5.77 m	Sashana Johnson; Jamaica	5.74 m	Brooklyn Lyttle; Belize	5.73 m
Triple jump	Jaeda Robinson; Jamaica	12.69 m CR	Tessa Clamy; Guadeloupe	12.09 m	Zavien Bernard; Jamaica	11.63 m
Shot put (3.0 kg)	Jamelia Young; Jamaica	14.25 m	Peyton Winter; Trinidad and Tobago	14.21 m	Terrell McCoy; Bahamas	14.11 m
Discus throw	Jamelia Young; Jamaica	36.80 m	Terrell McCoy; Bahamas	36.09 m	Léa Retardato-Samot; Martinique	35.73 m
Javelin throw (500 gr)	Dior-Rae Scott; Bahamas	52.53 m CR	Kamera Strachan; Bahamas	47.61 m	Zoelle Jamel; Jamaica	45.00 m

== Medal table ==
* Host nation (Grenada)

Rank	Nation	Gold	Silver	Bronze	Total
1	Jamaica (JAM)	45	23	16	84
2	Bahamas (BAH)	9	13	13	35
3	Trinidad and Tobago (TTO)	4	11	12	27
4	Guyana (GUY)	4	3	1	8
5	U.S. Virgin Islands (ISV)	2	0	1	3
6	Grenada (GRN)*	1	6	6	13
7	Cayman Islands (CAY)	1	1	2	4
7	Guadeloupe (GLP)	1	1	2	4
9	Antigua and Barbuda (ATG)	1	0	3	4
10	Belize (BIZ)	1	0	1	2
10	Saint Lucia (LCA)	1	0	1	2
12	Saint Kitts and Nevis (SKN)	0	3	0	3
13	Barbados (BAR)	0	2	3	5
14	Aruba (ARU)	0	2	0	2
15	Bermuda (BER)	0	1	1	2
16	Haiti (HAI)	0	1	0	1
17	Curaçao (CUW)	0	0	2	2
17	Martinique (MTQ)	0	0	2	2
19	British Virgin Islands (IVB)	0	0	1	1
19	Dominica (DMA)	0	0	1	1
Totals (20 entries)		70	67	68	205
