= Michelle Smith (hurdler) =

U.S. Virgin Islands athlete (born 2006)

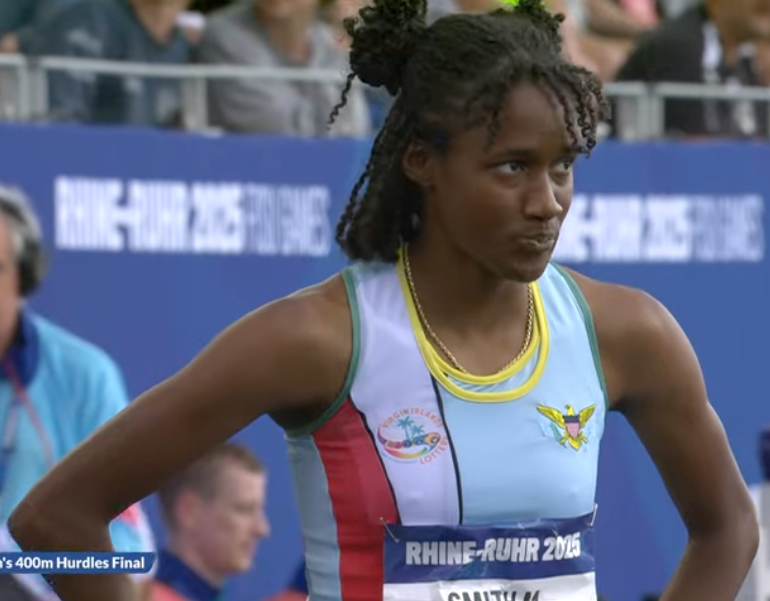
- At the 2025 Summer World University Games

Personal information
- Nationality: U.S. Virgin Islands
- Born: June 18, 2006 (age 20)

Sport
- Sport: Athletics
- Events: Sprint, Hurdles, Middle distance running

Achievements and titles
- Personal bests: 100m: 11.83 (St. Croix, 2023); 800m: 2:06.18 (St. George's, 2024); 400m hurdles: 54.56 (Gainesville, 2025)
Medal record
Women's athletics
Representing United States Virgin Islands
Pan American Championships
Gold medal – first place	2026 Medellín	400 m hurdles
Junior Pan American Games
Silver medal – second place	2025 Asunción	400 m hurdles
Summer World University Games
Silver medal – second place	2025 Bochum	400m hurdles
Pan American U20 Championships
Silver medal – second place	2023 Mayagüez	400 m hurdles
CARIFTA Games (U20)
Gold medal – first place	2025 Port of Spain	800 m
Gold medal – first place	2025 Port of Spain	400 m hurdles
Gold medal – first place	2024 St George's	800 m
Gold medal – first place	2024 St George's	400 m hurdles
Gold medal – first place	2023 Nassau	800 m
Gold medal – first place	2023 Nassau	400 m hurdles
NACAC U18 Championships
Gold medal – first place	2023 San Jose	800 m
Gold medal – first place	2023 San Jose	400 m hurdles
CARIFTA Games (U17)
Gold medal – first place	2022 Kingston	800 m
Gold medal – first place	2022 Kingston	400 m hurdles

Michelle Mycah Leonie Smith (born June 18, 2006) is a sprinter from the United States Virgin Islands. In 2023, she became national champion in the 100 metres and the 400 metres hurdles.

== Early life ==
She is from the island of Saint Croix. She attended Montverde Academy in Florida. In November 2023, she signed a letter of intent to attend the University of Georgia.

== Career ==
Competing at the 2022 CARIFTA Games in Kingston, Jamaica, she won gold in both the U17 400m hurdles, in 58.61 seconds, and the 800m with a time of 2:10.78. She finished fifth in the final of the 400 metres hurdles at the 2022 World Athletics U20 Championships in Cali, Colombia in August 2022.

At the 2023 CARIFTA Games in Nassau, Bahamas, she competed in the U20 category and ran 57.69 in the 400m hurdles and 2:09.72 in the 800m, winning both events. She won senior national titles in Saint Croix in the 400m hurdles on June 19, 2023. She also won the senior national title in the 100 metres, At the 2023 NACAC U-18 Championships in San Jose, Costa Rica, she won both the 400m hurdles, setting a new NACAC U18 record time of 56.99, and the 800m (2:09.90).

Smith also earned a silver medal in the 400m hurdles at the 2023 Pan American U20 Athletics Championships in Mayaguez, Puerto Rico in August 2023. She competed at the senior 2023 Pan American Games in Santiago in October 2023, and finished fourth in the 400m hurdles.

Smith was part of the Montverde Academy team which broke the US national high school record in the indoor 4x400 metres relay at the VA Showcase in February 2024, alongside Adaejah Hodge, Alivia Williams and Skyler Franklin. At the 2024 CARIFTA Games she won the 400m hurdles and 800 metres in St. George's, Grenada. She competed at the 2024 World Athletics U20 Championships in Lima, Peru.

In April 2025, as a freshman at the University of Georgia she set a school record for the 400 metres hurdles at the Florida Relays running 54.56 seconds in April 2025, surpassing Gudrun Arnardottir’s 54.93 mark set at the 1996 NCAA Championships. That month, she won gold medals in the U20 girls' 400 metres hurdles and 800 metres at the 2025 CARIFTA Games in Port of Spain, Trinidad and Tobago, security victory in 56.60 seconds in the 400m hurdles before returning to win the 800m in 2:07.23. She finished runnerup to Akala Garrett in the 400 metres hurdles at the SEC Championships in May 2025. She was a silver medalist in the 400 metres hurdles at the 2025 Summer World University Games in Bochum, Germany. She competed at the 2025 World Athletics Championships in Tokyo, Japan, running 56.00 seconds without qualifying for the semi-finals.

In June 2026, Smith qualified for the final of the 2026 NCAA Outdoor Championships, placing fourth overall. Later that month, Smith ran 54.93 seconds to win the inaugural 400 metres hurdles title at the 2026 Pan American Championships in Athletics in Medellín.
