= Anisha Gibbons =

Guyanese athlete (born 2004)

Personal information
- Nationality: Guyanese
- Born: 25 September 2004 (age 22)

Sport
- Sport: Athletics
- Event: Javelin

Achievements and titles
- Personal bests: Javelin: 51.27m (Lubbock, 2023)
Medal record
Women's athletics
Representing Guyana
CARIFTA Games (U20)
Gold medal – first place	2023 Nassau	Javelin
Gold medal – first place	2022 Kingston	Javelin

Anisha Gibbons (born 25 September 2004) is a Guyanese track and field athlete. She is a national champion and national record holder in the javelin throw.

== Early life ==
Gibbons attended New Mexico Junior College near Hobbs, New Mexico, United States on a scholarship to study business.

== Career ==
Gibbons won the CARIFTA Games U17 category in 2019. After the victory she was donated a new Javelin by the National Sports Commission after reports circulated that she had been practising using a 45-year-old Javelin.

Gibbons set a new national record throw of 45.37 metres in Leonora, Guyana on 3 April 2022. She won the CARIFTA U20 event in 2022 in Kingston, Jamaica. She became Guyanese senior national champion in June 2022.

Gibbons extended her national record with a 51.27 metres throw in Lubbock, Texas, United States in March 2023. She retained her CARIFTA Games U20 title in Nassau, Bahamas in 2023 with a distance of 47.96 metres.
