= Shawnti Jackson =

American athlete

Personal information
- Nationality: American
- Born: 2 May 2005 (age 21)

Sport
- Sport: Athletics
- Event: Sprint

Achievements and titles
- Personal bests: 60m: 7.16 (2023); 100m: 10.88 (2026); 200m: 22.12 (2026); 400m: 52.10 (2024)
Medal record
Women's athletics
Representing United States
World U20 Championships
Gold medal – first place	2022 Cali	4x400 m relay
Silver medal – second place	2022 Cali	4x100 m relay
Bronze medal – third place	2022 Cali	100m
Pan American U20 Championships
Gold medal – first place	2023 Mayagüez	200 m
Gold medal – first place	2023 Mayagüez	4×100 m relay

Shawnti Jackson (born 2 May 2005) is an American track and field athlete.

== Early and personal life ==
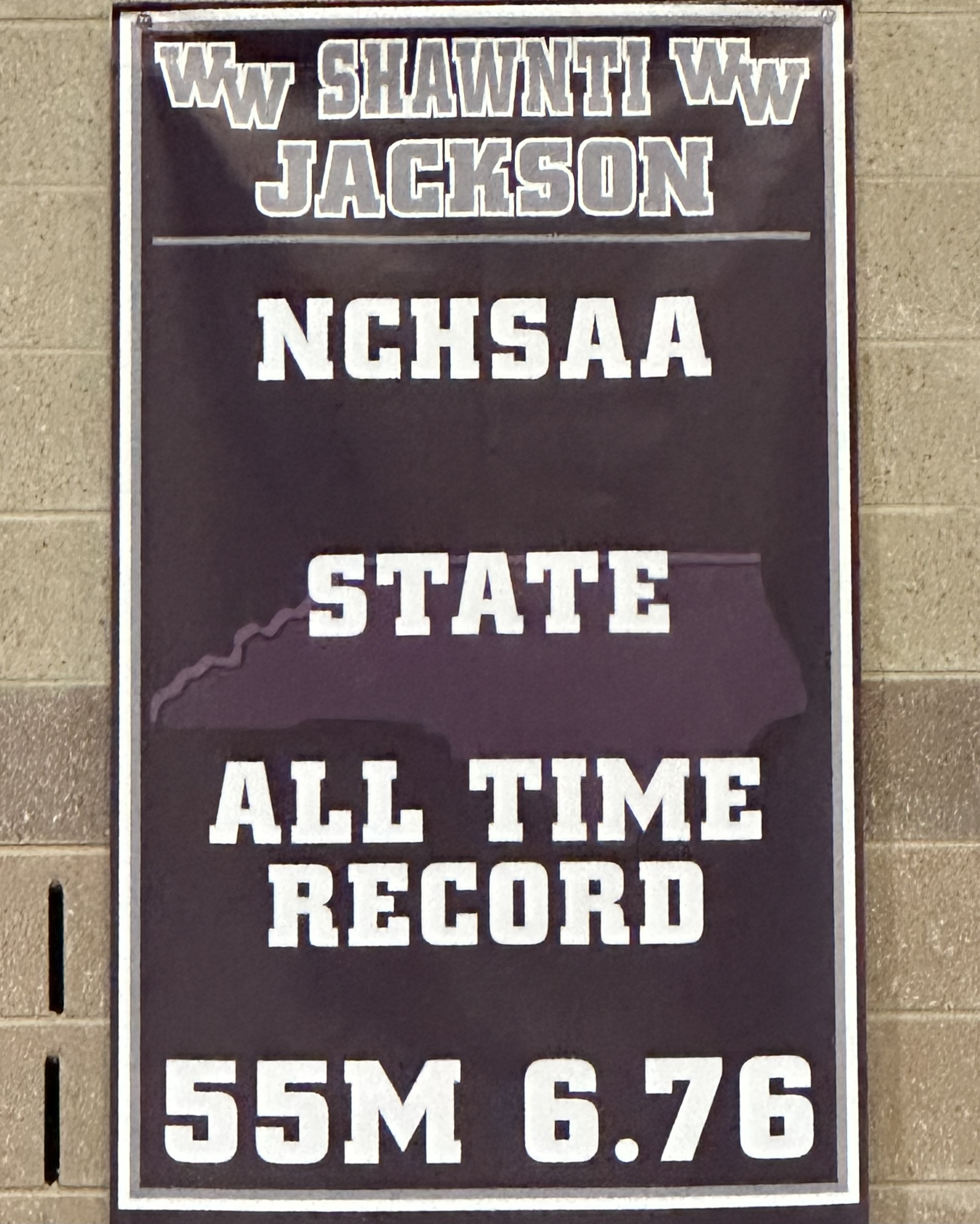
Jackson's 55m all-time state record banner at Wakefield High School

Jackson was coached from age ten by her father, Olympic 400m hurdles medalist, Bershawn Jackson. Her mother, Shannon, competed collegiately in track and field and earned All-American relay honors. She has a younger sister called Shari and a younger brother called Bershawn Jnr.

Jackson won her first national youth sprinting title at seven years old. She ran in the Junior Olympics in the 4 × 100 m in 2012.

Jackson attended Wakefield High School in Raleigh, North Carolina. As a teenager, Jackson set new high school national records for the 50m, 55m, and 60m distances. She achieved the qualifying time for the trials for the delayed 2020 Olympic Games as a 15-year-old but opted against competing. She spent a year at the Cardinal Gibbons Catholic School before switching back to Raleigh’s Wakefield High.

== Career ==
In January 2022, Jackson ran 7.18 for the 60m to earn third place at the Millrose Games, breaking the girl’s indoor high school national record.

She competed as a 17-year-old at the 2022 World Athletics U20 Championships in Cali, Colombia, and won a complete set of medals. She won a bronze medal in the 100m, running a time of 11.15s, then added a silver in the 4 × 100 m and a gold in the 4 × 400 m.

In January 2023, Jackson signed a letter of intent to compete for the Arkansas Razorbacks, having been ranked first in the 100m and second in the 400m, and fifth in the 200m in the high school rankings.

In June 2023, she became the third girl in American high school history to dip under 11 seconds for the 100m, after Briana Williams and Candace Hill. Running at the Music City Track Carnival in Nashville, Tennessee, she beat the previous high school national record by five-hundredths of a second, finishing in a new personal best time of 10.89.

Competing at the 2023 USA Outdoor Track and Field Championships in Eugene, Oregon, she reached the semi-finals of the 100m competition. In August 2023, she competed at the 2023 Pan American U20 Athletics Championships and was part of the American 4 × 100 m relay team that won gold in a new American U20 national record time. She also won gold in the individual 200 metres race in a competition record time of 22.38 seconds. In September 2023, Jackson signed a one year NIL deal with Brooks, becoming the companies first track and field NIL athlete.

In March 2025, Jackson received a warning from the United States Anti-Doping Agency for not securing a Therapeutic Use Exemption for iron (ferumoxytol) infusions administered by a doctor to treat a diagnosed medical condition. Later that year, Jackson transferred from Arkansas to Louisiana State University.

On her debut for LSU on 27 March 2026, Jackson broke the NCAA outdoor 300 metres record with a time of 35.89 seconds. The time also ranked in the top 25 in world history for indoors and outdoors combined. The following month, she equalled her personal best for 200 m with 22.35 seconds (+0.4) at the Tom Jones Memorial in Gainesville. In May, she ran 10.90 seconds for the 100 metres to qualify for the NCAA Outdoor Championships with the second fastest time from the East Regionals, behind Shenese Walker. Competing at the 2026 NCAA Championships, Jackson ran a personal best 10.88 seconds in the preliminary round before running 11.01 seconds to place third in the 100 m final. She also ran a personal best 22.12 to place second in the 200 m final at the Championships, behind Adeajah Hodge. On 4 July, she ran 11.02 seconds to place seventh in the 100 m at the 2026 Prefontaine Classic. On 11 July, Jackson won the 100 metres ahead of Mia Brahe-Pedersen with a time of 11.00 seconds at the Sound Running Sunset Tour.

== Athletics achievements ==
Information from her World Athletics profile unless otherwise noted.

=== Personal bests ===
Type	Distance	Time (s)	Wind (m/s)	Venue	Date	Notes
Individual events
Indoor	60 metres	7.16	—N/a	New York, United States	11 February 2023	
Indoor	200 metres sh	22.77	—N/a	Fayetteville, United States	26 January 2024	
Indoor	300 metres sh	36.73	—N/a	New York, United States	28 January 2023	
Outdoor	100 metres	10.88	+1.9	Eugene, United States	11 June 2026	
Outdoor	200 metres	22.12	-0.4	Eugene, United States	13 June 2026	
Outdoor	300 metres	35.89	—N/a	Coral Gables, United States	27 March 2026	
Team events
Indoor	4 × 400 metres relay sh	3:28.55	—N/a	Fayetteville, United States	10 February 2024	
Outdoor	4 × 100 metres relay	41.74	—N/a	Eugene, United States	13 June 2026	
Outdoor	4 × 400 metres relay	3:23.94	—N/a	Gainesville, United States	18 April 2026	

=== International competitions ===
Representing the United States
Year	Competition	Venue	Position	Event	Time	Notes
2022	World U20 Championships	Cali, Colombia	3rd	100 m	11.15	PB
2022	World U20 Championships	Cali, Colombia	2nd	4 × 100 m relay	43.28	NU20R
2022	World U20 Championships	Cali, Colombia	1st	4 × 400 m relay	3:28.06	SB
2023	Pan American U20 Championships	Mayagüez, Puerto Rico	1st	200 m	22.35	CR
2023	Pan American U20 Championships	Mayagüez, Puerto Rico	1st	4 × 100 m relay	42.88	CR
