= Sole Frederick =

Trinidad and Tobago athlete (born 2006)

Personal information
- Nationality: Trinidad and Tobago
- Born: 3 January 2006 (age 20)

Sport
- Sport: Athletics
- Event: Sprint

Achievements and titles
- Personal best: 200m: 23.02 (2024)
Medal record
Women's athletics
Representing Trinidad and Tobago
CARIFTA Games (U20)
Silver medal – second place	2023 Nassau	4×400 m relay
Silver medal – second place	2023 Nassau	4×100 m relay
Silver medal – second place	2024 St George's	200 m
Silver medal – second place	2024 St George's	4x100 m relay
Commonwealth Youth Games
Bronze medal – third place	2023 Trinbago	4x100 m mixed relay

Sole Frederick (born 3 January 2006) is a sprinter who runs for Trinidad and Tobago. She competed at the 2024 Summer Olympics.

== Early life ==
She attended Druid Hills High School in Atlanta, Georgia. She was announced as joining the University of Georgia on scholarship in 2023.

== Career ==
Competing at the 2023 CARIFTA Games, in Nassau, Bahamas, she won silver medals as part of the Trinidad and Tobago 4 × 100 m and 4 × 400 m relay teams. She won bronze in the mixed 4 × 100 m at the 2023 Commonwealth Youth Games hosted at the Hasely Crawford Stadium.

In February, Sole established an indoor national junior 200m record of 23.55 seconds. At the 2024 CARIFTA Games in Grenada 2024, Sole won silver medals in the 200m, and as part of the 4 × 100 m relay team. Sole won the 200m national championship in June 2024 and ran a personal best of 11.43 seconds in the 100m on 29 June at the National Championships at the Hasely Crawford Stadium.

On 8 August 2024, she ran as part of the Trinidad and Tobago 4 × 100 m relay team at the 2024 Summer Olympics in Paris.

== Personal life ==
Her twin sister Sanaa Frederick is also a sprinter. In March 2024, the sisters signed a Name, Image and Likeness (NIL) deal with Adidas.
