= Natrece East =

Jamaican sprinter (born 2008)

Personal information
- Nationality: Jamaican
- Born: 25 October 2008 (age 17)

Sport
- Sport: Athletics
- Event: Sprints
- Coached by: Michael Carr

Achievements and titles
- Personal bests: 100m, 11.21 (2026); 200m, 23.07 (2026)
Medal record
Women's athletics
Representing Jamaica
World U20 Championships
Gold medal – first place	2026 Eugene	4×100 m
CARIFTA Games (U20)
Gold medal – first place	2026 St George's	4×100 m
Silver medal – second place	2026 St George's	200 m
Bronze medal – third place	2026 St George's	100 m
CARIFTA Games (U17)
Gold medal – first place	2024 St George's	4×100 m
Gold medal – first place	2024 St George's	200 m
Bronze medal – third place	2023 Nassau	200 m

Natrece East (born 25 October 2008) is a Jamaican junior sprinter.

== Early life ==
East attends Wolmer's High School for Girls located at Heroes Circle Kingston, Jamaica.

== Career ==
East clocked a winning 11.21s in 100m for the class 2 girls final at the 2026 ISSA Grace Kennedy Boys and Girls Championships held at Independence Park. In the class two 200m final, she finished victorious in 23.54, taking the sprint double.

At the CARIFTA Games in April, East finished 3rd in the 100m, clocking 11.41, behind compatriot Shanoya Douglas and Alexxe Henry of Trinidad, who attends school and trains in Jamaica. Again, in the 200m final, she completed the race behind Douglas, on this occasion in 2nd recording 23.39s.

In August 2026, East competed at the 2026 World Athletics U20 Championships in the 4 × 100 metres relay. In the semifinals, Jamaica was the second-fastest team, with a time of 43.61 seconds, and advanced to the finals. In the final, East was part of the Jamaican quartet who won a gold medal, with a time of 42.89 seconds.
