= Quincy Penn =

Bahamian sprinter (born 2005)

Quincy Penn (born 6 September 2005) is a Bahamian sprinter. She competed in the 2024 Summer olympics in the Mixed 4 × 400 metres relay.

== World rankings ==
Quincy Penn's highest ranking in the women's 400m event is 200th. In the Women's overall ranking, she is ranked 2602.

== Education ==
Quincy Penn went to Royal Palm Beach High School in Florida. Penn competed for the Florida Gators track and field team in the NCAA.

== Career ==
Quincy Penn's times have improved over the years. In 2022, she took part in a 200 metres race at Percy Beard Track, Gainsesville. Her time was 24.96. In 2023, she did a race at the Thomas Robinson Stadium in Nassau with a time of 24.53. In 2024, she did a race in UCF Soccer and Track Complex in Orlando. Her time was 23.42. Over 3 years her time got quicker by 1.54 seconds. Her 400 metre time has also improved by a lot. In 2022, she took part in a race at Percy Beard Track in Gainesville. Her time was 56.34 seconds. In 2023, she did a race at the Thomas Robinson Stadium in Nassau with a time of 55.79 seconds. In 2024, she got a big PB of 51.91 seconds at the Percy Beard Track.

== Career ==
Personal best times
Event	Venue	Time	Date	Notes
400m	UCF Soccer and Track Complex, Orlando	51.91	30 March 2024	
200m	UCF Soccer and Track Complex, Orlando	23.42	15 March 2024	
4x100m	Nassau	45.55	9 April 2023	
300m	Norton Sports Center, Louisville	38.86	12 January 2024	
300m Short Track	Norton Sports Center, Louisville	38.86	12 January 2024	
4x400 Metres Relay	Percy Beard Track, Gainesville	3:39.29	30 March 2024	
4x400 Metres Relay Short Track	Norton Sports Center, Louisville	3:51.33	13 January 2024	
100m	Nassau	12.93	21 March 2019	
4x400m Relay Mixed	Stade de France, Paris	3:14.58	2 August 2024	
