= Davonte Howell =

Caymanian sprinter (born 2005)

Personal information
- Born: 28 October 2005 (age 20) Barbados
- Height: 1.76 m (5 ft 9 in)

Sport
- Sport: Athletics
- Events: 100 metres; 200 metres

Achievements and titles
- Personal bests: 100m: 9.98 (2025); 200m: 20.88 (2024)
Medal record
Men's athletics
Representing Cayman Islands
Junior Pan American Games
Gold medal – first place	2025 Asunción	100 m
CARIFTA Games Junior (U20)
Gold medal – first place	2023 Nassau, Bahamas	100m
Gold medal – first place	2024 St. George's, Grenada	100m

Davonte Howell (born 28 October 2005) is a Caymanian sprinter. He competed in the men's 100 metres event at the 2024 Summer Olympics.

At the 50th CARIFTA Games in 2023, ran the 100m in 10.28 seconds, making him the champion of the under 20 bracket. He was coached by Dwight Thomas, Olympic gold-medal sprinter for Jamaica. He also won the gold in the same category in the 51st CARIFTA Games, with a time of 10.15.

Howell competed for the Tennessee Volunteers track and field team in the NCAA. He ran as part of the 4 × 100 m relay team at the 2024 NCAA Outdoor Championships.
