= Kishawna Niles =

Barbadian athlete (born 2005)

Personal information
- Nationality: Barbados
- Born: 16 August 2005 (age 20)

Sport
- Sport: Athletics
- Event: Sprint

Achievements and titles
- Personal bests: 60m: 7.12s (2025); 100m: 11.33s (2024)
Medal record
Women's athletics
Representing Barbados
World U20 Championships
Silver medal – second place	2024 Lima	100 m
CARIFTA Games Junior (U20)
Silver medal – second place	2022 Kingston	4×100 m

Kishawna Niles (born 16 August 2005) is a Barbadian sprinter. She became Barbadian national champion over 100 metres in 2023. She won the silver medal over 100 metres at the 2024 World Athletics U20 Championships.

== Biography ==
In 2022, she ran for Velocity Management. She was a silver medalist in the 4 × 100 m relay at the 2022 CARIFTA Games in Kingston, Jamaica. She also finishes sixth in the individual 100 metres race at the Games.

She ran 11.78 seconds for the 100 metres at the Barbadian U20 Championships in March 2023. She won the senior Barbadian national championships title over 100 metres in July 2023, running 11.83 seconds.

She moved to train with the MVP Club in Jamaica. She became Barbados U20 national record holder for the 100 metres with a run of 11.33 seconds in 2024. She qualified fastest for the final at the 2024 World Athletics U20 Championships in the women's 100 metres, running 11.39 seconds. She was third across the line in the final, running 11.37 seconds. Niles was later promoted to the silver medal after previous silver medalist Adeajah Hodge failed a drug test.

She set a 60 metres personal best of 7.12 seconds competing in Jamaica on 1 March 2025. She reached the semi-finals of the 60 metres at the 2025 World Athletics Indoor Championships in Nanjing.

In July 2026, Niles competed in the 100 metres at the 2026 Commonwealth Games in Glasgow, Scotland, reaching the semi-finals.

== Personal life ==
She attends University of Technology, Jamaica.
