= Edwin Allen High School =

School in Frankfield, Jamaica

Coordinates: 18.1537°N 77.3725°W

Edwin Allen High School is a co-educational public secondary school located in Frankfield, Jamaica. The school is one of the top performers at the Inter-Secondary Schools Boys and Girls Championships.
