= Tia Clayton =

Jamaican sprinter (born 2004)

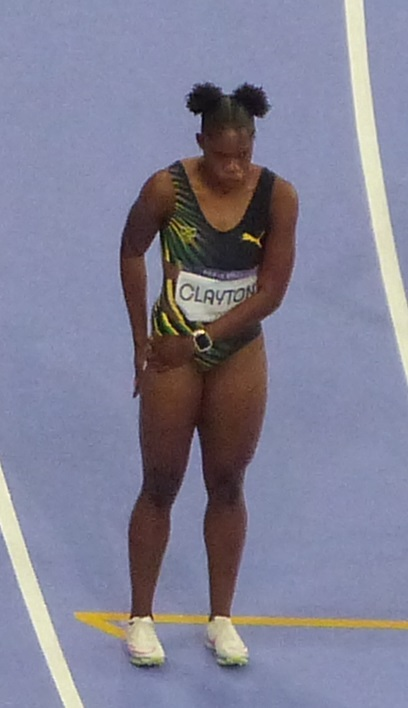
- Tia Clayton at the 2024 Paris Olympics

Personal information
- Born: 17 August 2004 (age 22) Westmoreland, Jamaica

Sport
- Country: Jamaica
- Sport: Track and field
- Event: Sprints
- Club: MVP Track Club
- Coached by: Corey Bennett; Stephen Francis

Achievements and titles
- Personal bests: 60 m: 7.02 (St. Catherine 2026); 100 m: 10.82 (Chorzów 2025); 200 m: 23.04 (Kingston 2026)
Medal record
Women's athletics
Representing Jamaica
World Championships
Silver medal – second place	2025 Tokyo	4 × 100 m relay
World Relays
Gold medal – first place	2026 Gaborone	Mixed 4 × 100 m relay
Bronze medal – third place	2025 Guangzhou	4 × 100 m relay
Diamond League
Second place	2025 Zurich	100 m
World U20 Championships
Gold medal – first place	2021 Nairobi	4 × 100 m relay
Gold medal – first place	2022 Cali	4 × 100 m relay
CARIFTA Games (U20)
Gold medal – first place	2022 Kingston	4 × 100 m relay
Silver medal – second place	2022 Kingston	100 m
CARIFTA Games (U17)
Gold medal – first place	2018 Nassau	4 × 100 m relay

Tia Clayton (born 17 August 2004) is a Jamaican sprinter specializing in the short sprints.

== Early life ==
Tia comes from Grange Hill, Westmoreland. She attended Edwin Allen High School in Clarendon parish along with her twin sister Tina Clayton.

== Career ==
She ran the anchor legs for the Jamaican 4 × 100 metres relay teams that broke the world under-20 records at both the 2021 World U20 Championships (42.94 s) and 2022 World U20 Championships (42.59 s).

Tia's twin sister Tina, ran the second leg of those world record relays.

Both sisters excelled at the 15-16 age category nationally.

=== 2021 ===
In the final of the class two 100m final at the ISSA Boys and Girls Championships known locally as Champs, she false started preventing her from realizing a quinella victory with Tina. In the relay, she got redemption winning gold.

Tia failed to qualify for the individual 100 metres team for the 2021 World Athletics U20 Championships in Nairobi, Kenya most likely as a result of injury experienced earlier that season. Nevertheless, she was listed as one of the 4 × 100 metres relay participants that mined gold in a world U20 record of 42.94.

=== 2022 ===
Unlike the prior year, Tia completed the final mining a bronze medal in 11.47 in the class one 100m at the ISSA competition. Again, the team produced another gold from the 4 × 100 metres relay winning in 43.28, the eight consecutive for their school.

At the annual CARIFTA Games in Kingston, Jamaica, she earned a silver medal in 11.30, when the siblings ended the race with a one two (2022 CARIFTA Games).

In August at the 2022 World Athletics U20 Championships in Cali, Colombia, she failed to advance to the finals in the 100m, but as expected, she ran a blistering anchor leg to cross the line in world record time 42.59 to include Serena Cole, Tina Clayton, and Kerrica Hill.

=== 2023 ===
After going pro, the year found Tia familiarizing herself with the pro training system at MVP and the move to Kingston.

=== 2024 ===
Tia finished second in the 100 m at the 2024 Jamaican Athletics Championships in a time of 10.90 seconds (-0.3 m/s wind), behind Shericka Jackson (10.84 s) and ahead of Shelly-Ann Fraser-Pryce (10.94 s), to qualify for the Jamaican team for the 2024 Summer Olympics. At the Olympics, she ran a new Personal Best (PB) of 10.86 s in 100m (+1.0 m/s wind) winning her semi-final (beating the PB of 11.02 s (+0.7 m/s wind) she had set the day before in the heats). However, she finished 7th in the finals in 11.04 (Athletics at the 2024 Summer Olympics - Women's 100 metres). And 5th in the relays (Athletics at the 2024 Summer Olympics - Women's 4 × 100 metres relay).

=== 2025 ===
For the 2025 JAAA National Championships, she pulled up during the final due to injury. Therefore, she missed out on the individual team for the 2025 World Athletics Championships in Tokyo, Japan. Because of her fast times during the season prior to the injury, she was selected as a member of the relay squad. At the games, she and the team secured a silver medal in a 41.79 season best (2025 World Athletics Championships - Women's 4 × 100 metres relay).

Earlier in the year, at the 2025 World Athletics Relays in China, she earned another 4 x 100 metres medal in color bronze after racing in the heats to qualify the team to the final. Shericka Jackson ran a strong anchor leg to get the team to third in 42.33.

=== 2026 ===
At the Fuller Anderson meet in January, she won section A of the 100 metres in 7.02 (+1.2).

In the 200 metres final A race, she finished 5th in 23.33 (+0.5) at the Velocity Fest 18 local circuit development meet.

On May 2, 2026, the team of Ackeem Blake, Tina Clayton, Kadrian Goldson, and Tia Clayton broke the world record running a 39.99 in the heats of the mixed 4 × 100 metres relay. The next day in the final, they again smashed the world record lowering the previous achievement to 39.62 winning the gold in fine style (2026 World Athletics Relays). Jamaica is the first country to go below the 40 seconds mark in this event.

On May 9, at the JAAA Puma meet, she clocked 10.91 in the 100 metres winning ahead of her sister.

== Athletics achievements ==
Information from her World Athletics profile unless otherwise noted.

=== Personal bests ===
Type	Distance	Time (s)	Wind (m/s)	Venue	Date	Notes
Individual events
Outdoor	60 metres	7.02	+1.2	Spanish Town, Jamaica	17 January 2026	
Outdoor	100 metres	10.82	+0.1	Chorzów, Poland	16 August 2025	
Outdoor	200 metres	23.04	+0.5	Kingston, Jamaica	19 April 2026	
Team events
Outdoor	4 × 100 metres relay	41.79	—N/a	Tokyo, Japan	21 September 2025	
Outdoor	Mixed 4 × 100 metres relay	39.62	—N/a	Gaborone, Botswana	3 May 2026	WR

=== International competitions ===
Representing Jamaica
Year	Competition	Venue	Position	Event	Time	Notes
2018	CARIFTA Youth Games	Nassau, Bahamas	1st	4 × 100 m relay	44.95	
2021	World U20 Championships	Nairobi, Kenya	1st	4 × 100 m relay	42.94	WU20R
2022	CARIFTA Games	Kingston, Jamaica	2nd	100 m	11.30	
2022	CARIFTA Games	Kingston, Jamaica	1st	4 × 100 m relay	42.58	CR
2022	World U20 Championships	Cali, Colombia	1st	4 × 100 m relay	42.59	WU20R
2024	World Relays	Nassau, Bahamas	18th (h)	4 × 100 m relay	43.33	
2024	Olympic Games	Paris, France	7th	100 m	11.04	
2024	Olympic Games	Paris, France	5th	4 × 100 m relay	42.29	SB
2025	World Championships	Tokyo, Japan	2nd	4 × 100 m relay	41.79	SB
2026	World Relays	Gaborone, Botswana	1st	Mixed 4 × 100 m relay	39.62	WR
