= Lucy-May Sleeman =

Irish sprinter (born 2004)

Personal information
- Nationality: Irish
- Born: 24 May 2004 (age 22)

Sport
- Sport: Athletics
- Event: Sprint

Achievements and titles
- Personal bests: 60m: 7.27 (Louisville, 2025); 100m: 11.26 (Lexington, 2026); 200m: 23.68 (Clemson, 2026)

Lucy-May Sleeman (born 24 May 2004) is an Irish sprinter.

== Early life ==
From Cork, Ireland, Sleeman trained as a member of Leevale athletics club and studied economics at Florida State University.

== Career ==
Sleeman won both the 100 metres and 200 metres at the Irish U20 Championships in July 2022. She was a semi finalist in the 100 metres at the 2022 World Athletics U20 Championships in Cali, Colombia. In July 2023, she was runner-up to Sarah Lavin in the 100 metres at the senior Irish Athletics Championships.

In March 2025, she ran a personal best of 7.27 seconds for the 60 metres at the AAC Indoor T&F Championships in Louisville, Kentucky to move to joint-third on the Irish all-time list. Sleeman was selected for the Irish team to run the 100 metres at the 2025 European Athletics Team Championships Second Division in Maribor in June 2025. She was a semi-finalist in the 100 metres at the 2025 European Athletics U23 Championships in Bergen, Norway.

In February 2026, Sleeman ran 7.28 seconds for 60m at the Tiger Paw Invitational in Clemson, returning later at the same meet to run an indoor 200 metres personal best of 23.68, moving ninth on the Irish indoor all-time list. Sleeman improved to equal fourth on the Irish all-time list for 60 metres on 28 February, running 7.26 seconds in finishing second at the Atlantic Coast Conference Championships. She also improved to eighth on the all-time Irish indoor list with 23.50 seconds for 200 metres at the championships.

In May, Sleeman ran a new 100m personal best of 11.26 seconds (+0.3 m/s) at the NCAA Division I Track & Field Championships East Regional Preliminaries in Lexington, Kentucky. On 13 June, she placed sixth overall with the Florida State 4 × 100 m relay team alongside Shenese Walker, Micayah Holland and Liana Tyson at the 2026 NCAA Division I Outdoor Track and Field Championships. In July, Sleeman was a finalist in the 100 metres at the 2026 Irish Athletics Championships, placing fourth overall. The following month, she was part of the Ireland women's 4 x 100 metres relay team that set a new national record of 43.13 at the 2026 European Athletics Championships in Birmingham, England.
