= Brianna Lyston =

Jamaican sprinter (born 2004)

Personal information
- Nationality: Jamaican
- Born: 24 May 2004 (age 22)
- Home town: Portmore, Jamaica

Sport
- Country: Jamaica
- Sport: Track and Field
- Event: Sprints
- College team: LSU Lady Tigers
- Club: Pure Athletics
- Coached by: Lance Brauman
Medal record
Women's athletics
Representing Jamaica
World U20 Championships
Gold medal – first place	2022 Cali	200 m
CARIFTA Games Junior (U20)
Gold medal – first place	2022 Kingston	200 m
Gold medal – first place	2022 Kingston	4 × 100 m
CARIFTA Games Youth (U17)
Gold medal – first place	2019 George Town	4 × 100 m
Silver medal – second place	2019 George Town	200 m

Brianna Lyston (born 24 May 2004) is a Jamaican sprint athlete who holds the 200 m under-13s world record in 23.72s.

== Career ==
Lyston ran 22.53 (–2.2) at the 2022 ISSA Boys and Girls Championship in Kingston, Jamaica. This made her the second fastest Under 20 female athlete from Jamaica. This also broke the Class 1 meeting record which was held by Simone Facey who ran a 22.71 back in 2004. A month later, at the 2022 CARIFTA Games held at the National Stadium in Kingston, she ran the third leg of the 4x100 relay clocking a championship record time of 42.58. In addition, she won the 200 metres gold in 23.16.

Lyston won her 100 m heat in a personal best 11.14 (+0.7) at the 2022 Central Athletics Championships in Spanish Town, Jamaica to beat Tia Clayton.

== 2024 ==
In March 2024, she won the NCAA indoor 60m title with a personal best of 7.03. She ran 10.91 seconds for the 100 metres at the SEC Championship in Gainesville, Florida on 11 May 2024. At the NCAA outdoor championships, she placed second in the 100 metres in 10.89 (+2.2).

== 2025 ==
After continual injuries, Lyston decided in 2025 to end her college tenure to go professional. she is signed to shoe sponsor Adidas.

== 2026 ==
In 2026, she represented Jamaica at the World Athletics Indoor Championships in Torun, Poland where she finished 4th in the final (7.05).

Brianna ran the 100 metres in 10.94 at the Pure Athletics Spring Invitational in Florida April 2026.

== Biography ==
Lyston attended St. Jago High before transferring to Hydel High, both located in St. Catherine Parish.

== Athletics achievements ==
Information from her World Athletics profile unless otherwise noted.

=== Personal bests ===
Type	Distance	Time (s)	Wind (m/s)	Venue	Date	Notes
Individual events
Indoor	55 metres	7.02	—N/a	Lynchburg, United States	18 January 2019	
Indoor	60 metres	7.03	—N/a	Boston, United States	9 March 2024	
Indoor	200 metres sh	23.16	—N/a	Albuquerque, United States	2 February 2024	
Outdoor	100 metres	10.91	+0.3	Gainesville, United States	11 May 2024	
Outdoor	200 metres	22.31	-1.0	Gainesville, United States	9 May 2024	
Outdoor	300 metres	41.52	—N/a	Kingston, Jamaica	14 December 2019	
Outdoor	400 metres	56.86	—N/a	Spanish Town, Jamaica	18 February 2020	
Team events
Indoor	4 × 200 metres relay sh	1:38.97	—N/a	Lynchburg, United States	19 January 2019	
Indoor	4 × 400 metres relay sh	3:31.05	—N/a	Boston, United States	9 March 2024	
Outdoor	4 × 100 metres relay	42.42	—N/a	Gainesville, United States	18 April 2026	
Outdoor	4 × 400 metres relay	3:28.08	—N/a	Gainesville, United States	11 May 2024	

=== International competitions ===
Representing Jamaica
Year	Competition	Venue	Position	Event	Time	Notes
2019	CARIFTA Youth Games	George Town, Cayman Islands	2nd	200 m	23.53	
2019	CARIFTA Youth Games	George Town, Cayman Islands	1st	4 × 100 m relay	45.63	
2021	World U20 Championships	Nairobi, Kenya	DQ	200 m	23.18 (Note: Time from the heats; disqualified in semi-finals)	TR17.2.3
2022	CARIFTA Junior Games	Kingston, Jamaica	1st	200 m	23.16	
2022	CARIFTA Junior Games	Kingston, Jamaica	1st	4 × 100 m relay	42.58	
2022	World U20 Championships	Cali, Colombia	1st	200 m	22.65	
2026	World Indoor Championships	Toruń, Poland	4th	60 m	7.05	SB
2026	World Ultimate Championship	Budapest, Hungary	11th (h)	100 m	11.18	

=== National championships and competitions ===
Year	Competition	Venue	Position	Event	Time	Wind (m/s)	Notes
2023	NCAA Division I Championships	Austin, Texas	24th (sf)	200 m	23.43	+0.8	
2023	NCAA Division I Championships	Austin, Texas	3rd	4 × 100 m relay	42.52	—N/a	
2024	NCAA Division I Indoor Championships	Boston, Massachusetts	1st	60 m	7.03	—N/a	
2024	NCAA Division I Indoor Championships	Boston, Massachusetts	3rd	4 × 400 m relay	3:31.05	—N/a	
2024	NCAA Division I Championships	Eugene, Oregon	2nd	100 m	10.89	+2.2	
2024	NCAA Division I Championships	Eugene, Oregon	13th (sf)	200 m	22.76	+1.2	
2024	NCAA Division I Championships	Eugene, Oregon	2nd	4 × 100 m relay	42.57	—N/a	
2025	NCAA Division I Indoor Championships	Virginia Beach, Virginia	DNS	60 m	7.17 (Note: Time from the heats; she did not start in the final)	—N/a	
