= Michaela Rose (runner) =

American middle-distance runner, sprinter and hurdler

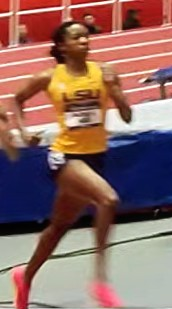
- Rose at the 2024 NCAA Division I Indoor Track and Field Championships

Personal information
- National team: United States
- Born: June 13, 2003 (age 23) Suffolk, Virginia, U.S.
- Education: Louisiana State University
- Height: 175 cm (5 ft 9 in)

Sport
- Country: United States
- Sport: Athletics
- Event(s): Middle-distance running Sprinting; Hurdling; Track and field
- College team: LSU Lady Tigers
- Club: Adidas; 2023–present

Achievements and titles
- Personal best(s): 400 metres: 53.42 s (Baton Rouge, 2023) 400m hurdles: 56.86 s (Cali, 2022); 800 metres: 1:58.37 (Gainesville, 2024); 1500 metres: 4:11.98 (Azusa, 2023) 6km: 20:32.3
Medal record
Women's athletics
Representing the United States
World U20 Championships
Bronze medal – third place	2022 Cali	400 m hurdles

Michaela Rose (born 13 June 2003) is an American track and field athlete. Rose set a US collegiate indoor track record in 2024 over 600 yards.

== Team USA ==
In August 2022, Rose competed in the 400m hurdles at the 2022 World Athletics U20 Championships, and won the bronze medal behind compatriot Akala Garrett.

== NCAA ==
Rose set an NCAA indoor track record at 600 yards in January 2024, bettering Delisa Walton-Floyd time of 1:17.38 set in 1982. Rose is an NCAA Division I champion, 6-time All-American & 6-time Southeastern Conference SEC champion (indoors and outdoors).

In April 2023, Rose ran 1:59.08, the second fastest time in NCAA history over 800m. Running for LSU at the 2023 NCAA Division I Outdoor Track and Field Championships in June 2023, Rose ran the fastest NCAA preliminarily 800m ever of 2:00.31. Rose later won the final in the 800m at the NCAA outdoors championships held in Austin, Texas with a time of 1:59.83.

Competing at the 2023 USA Outdoor Track and Field Championships, in Eugene, Oregon, Michaela Rose reached the final of the 800m competition as the second fastest qualifier.

At the 2024 NCAA Division I Indoor Track and Field Championships on 9 March 2024, Rose won silver in the 800 metres final in a time of 1:59.81.

On 12 April 2024, she ran 1:58.37 for the 800 metres at the Florida Invitational. In doing so, she became the second female college athlete to run under 1:59, after Athing Mu.

She won the SEC Championships 800m race in May 2025, running 1:59.75 to finish two seconds clear of the field. Rose broke Suzy Favor's 35-year-old meet record with a run of 1:58.95 in her semi-final of the 800 metres at the 2025 NCAA Outdoor Championships final in Eugene, Oregon in June 2025.

== Early and personal life ==
Michaela Rose is from Suffolk, Virginia, daughter to Marcia and Michael Rose. She was homeschooled. Her mother is the coach at Tallwood High School and her Dad is the Head Cross Country and Track & Field Coach at Regent University. Both competed in track and field at Auburn University.

== Prep ==
Michaela Rose is a 2019 New Balance 800-meter champion – New Balance Nationals Outdoor championship in 2019 with a time of 2:04.38.

In 2019, Rose competed at the AAU Junior Olympic Games in Greensboro, winning the 800m and 400m hurdles event for the 15–16 years-old age group. Considered the top female recruit in the country, she joined Louisiana State University in 2021.

Rose competed in southeast region Foot Locker Cross Country Championships.
