= Tess McHugh =

British sprinter (born 2002)

Personal information
- Nationality: British (Welsh)
- Born: 19 June 2002 (age 24)

Sport
- Sport: Athletics
- Event: Sprint

Achievements and titles
- Personal bests: 200m: 24.32 (2026); 400m: 52.48 (2026); 800m: 2:13.88 (2024); 400mH 57.69 (2026)

Tess McHugh (born 19 June 2002) is a British sprinter from Wales. She represented Great Britain at the 2026 World Athletics Indoor Championships in the women's 4 x 400 metres relay.

== Biography ==
Coached by Stephen Ball, in January 2025, a championship best performance from McHugh saw her win the 400 metres at the Welsh Indoor Championships ahead of Hannah Brier, winning in a time of 54.02 seconds to break the record set by Brier in winning the title the previous year. In May 2025, McHugh set a new personal best of 52.62 seconds in winning the 400 metres at the Belfast Milers event in Northern Ireland. That month, McHugh competed for Wales at the Loughborough International.

McHugh was a finalist over 400 metres at the 2026 British Indoor Athletics Championships in Birmingham, placing sixth overall and running a personal best of 52.78 seconds during the competition. Competing indoors in Glasgow, she set a new outright personal best of 52.48 seconds on 1 March. She was subsequently named in the British squad for the 2026 World Athletics Indoor Championships in Toruń, Poland. She anchored the women's 4 x 400 metres relay team on debut alongside Jazmine Moss, Poppy Malik and Louisa Stoney, as they qualified for the final in a time of 3:29.31. She also ran the final alongside Stoney, Keely Hodgkinson and Dina Asher-Smith, with the team placing fifth overall.
