= Dina Asher-Smith =

British sprinter (born 1995)

Dina Asher-Smith MBE
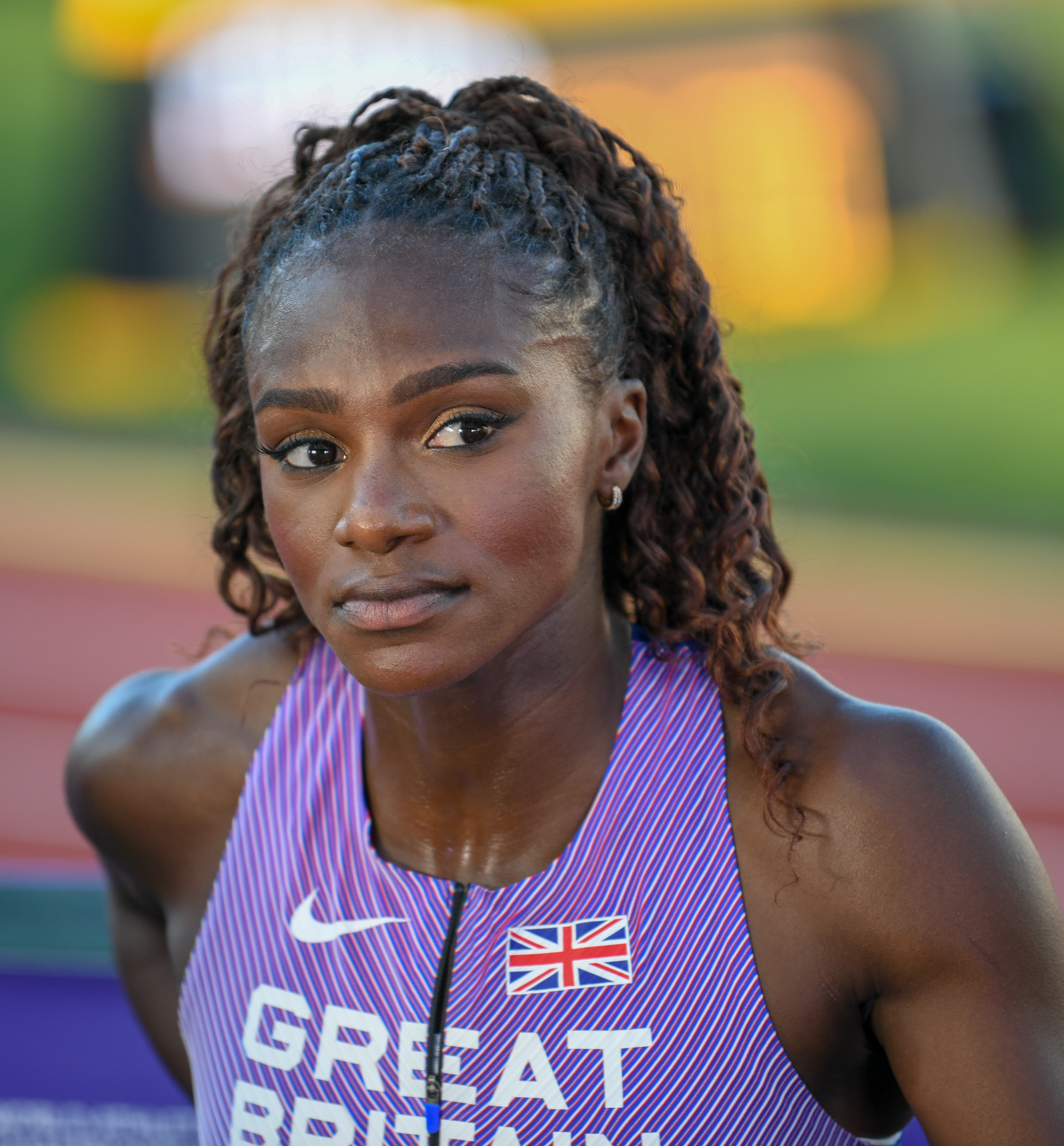
- Asher-Smith at the 2022 World Championships in Eugene

Personal information
- Full name: Geraldina Rachel Asher-Smith
- Born: 4 December 1995 (age 30) Orpington, London, United Kingdom
- Education: King's College London
- Height: 1.64 m (5 ft 5 in)
- Weight: 58 kg (128 lb)

Sport
- Country: Great Britain & N.I. England
- Sport: Athletics
- Event: Sprint
- Club: Blackheath and Bromley Harriers Athletic Club

Achievements and titles
- Personal bests: 100 m: 10.83 NR (Doha 2019); 200 m: 21.88 NR (Doha 2019); Indoors; 60 m: 7.03i NR (Birmingham 2023)
Medal record
Women's athletics
Representing Great Britain
Olympic Games
Silver medal – second place	2024 Paris	4 × 100 m relay
Bronze medal – third place	2016 Rio de Janeiro	4 × 100 m relay
Bronze medal – third place	2020 Tokyo	4 × 100 m relay
World Championships
Gold medal – first place	2019 Doha	200 m
Silver medal – second place	2017 London	4 × 100 m relay
Silver medal – second place	2019 Doha	100 m
Silver medal – second place	2019 Doha	4 × 100 m relay
Bronze medal – third place	2013 Moscow	4 × 100 m relay
Bronze medal – third place	2022 Eugene	200 m
Diamond League
Winner	2019	100 m
European Championships
Gold medal – first place	2016 Amsterdam	200 m
Gold medal – first place	2018 Berlin	100 m
Gold medal – first place	2018 Berlin	200 m
Gold medal – first place	2018 Berlin	4 × 100 m relay
Gold medal – first place	2024 Rome	100 m
Gold medal – first place	2024 Rome	4 × 100 m relay
Gold medal – first place	2026 Birmingham	4 × 100 m relay
Gold medal – first place	2026 Birmingham	4 × 100 m mixed
Silver medal – second place	2016 Amsterdam	4 × 100 m relay
Silver medal – second place	2022 Munich	200 m
Bronze medal – third place	2026 Birmingham	200 m
European Indoor Championships
Silver medal – second place	2015 Prague	60 m
World Junior Championships
Gold medal – first place	2014 Eugene	100 m
European Junior Championships
Gold medal – first place	2013 Rieti	200 m
Gold medal – first place	2013 Rieti	4 × 100 m relay
Representing Europe
Continental Cup
Silver medal – second place	2018 Ostrava	100 m
Silver medal – second place	2018 Ostrava	4 × 100 m relay
Representing England
Commonwealth Games
Gold medal – first place	2018 Gold Coast	4 × 100 m relay
Bronze medal – third place	2018 Gold Coast	200 m
Commonwealth Youth Games
Gold medal – first place	2011 Douglas	200 m
Gold medal – first place	2011 Douglas	4 × 100 m relay

Geraldina Rachel Asher-Smith MBE (born 4 December 1995) is a British sprinter competing in the 60 metres, 100 m and 200 m. Internationally competing since 2011, she holds national records in all three sprint events, making her the fastest British woman on record.

Asher-Smith won a gold medal in the 200 metres, silver in the 100 metres and another silver in the 4 × 100 m relay at the 2019 World Championships, breaking her own British records. She was the first Briton to win three medals at a World Championships. She earned a bronze in the 200 m at the 2022 World Championships. As part of 4 × 100 m relay teams, she won bronze medals at the 2016 Rio Olympics and the 2020 Tokyo Olympics, and the silver medal at the 2024 Paris Olympics as well as medals at the 2013, 2017 and 2019 World Championships. Her highest Olympic finish individually was fourth in the 200 metres at the 2024 Games, missing a medal by two-hundredths of a second.

Asher-Smith won the 2013 European Junior 200 m title and the 2014 World Junior 100 m title. In July 2015, she became the first British woman to run under 11 seconds for the 100 m. She then broke Kathy Cook's 31-year-old British 200 m record when finishing fifth at the 2015 World Championships. In this distance, she placed fifth at the 2016 Olympics and fourth at the 2017 World Championships. Asher-Smith is also a four-time individual European champion, including the 200 m title in 2016 and the 100 m/200 m double in 2018, and earned a silver for the 200 m in 2022 before reclaiming the 100 m title in 2024. By winning gold in the women's and the mixed 4×100 m relays at the 2026 European Championships, she became the most successful athlete in European Championship history, with eight golds in total. She was the 2019 Diamond League champion over 100 m.

Domestically, Asher-Smith has won eleven national titles, indoors and out, over 60 metres, 100 metres and 200 metres as of 2026. She is the British record holder for the 100 m and 200 m and the British indoor record holder for the 60 m. Asher-Smith has been listed in the Powerlist as one of the UK's most influential people of African-Caribbean descent, most recently in the 2021 edition.

== Early life and education ==
Asher-Smith was born on 4 December 1995 in Orpington, London. Her parents are Julie, who was born in London, and Winston, who was born in Jamaica but moved to England when he was a child. She has Jamaican and Trinidadian ancestry. She attended Perry Hall Primary School. From 2008 to 2014, she attended Newstead Wood School in Orpington. Asher-Smith achieved 9 A stars and 2 As in her GCSEs. In August 2014, she got 3 A-Levels which allowed her entry into King's College London to study history. Upon receiving the results, she called it "the best morning" of her life. Asher-Smith graduated with a BA in 2017. She is a supporter of Manchester United F.C.

Asher-Smith was coached by John Blackie until 2023. In 2009, she ran the 300 metres in 39.16 seconds to set the current world age 13 best. She has won the English Schools Championships 200 m title as an Under 15 (2010), U17 (2011) and U20 (2013). She won the 2013 event in a time of 23.63 s into a strong headwind.

Asher-Smith worked as a kit-bag carrier during the 2012 London Olympics, including on "Super Saturday".

=== Junior competitions ===
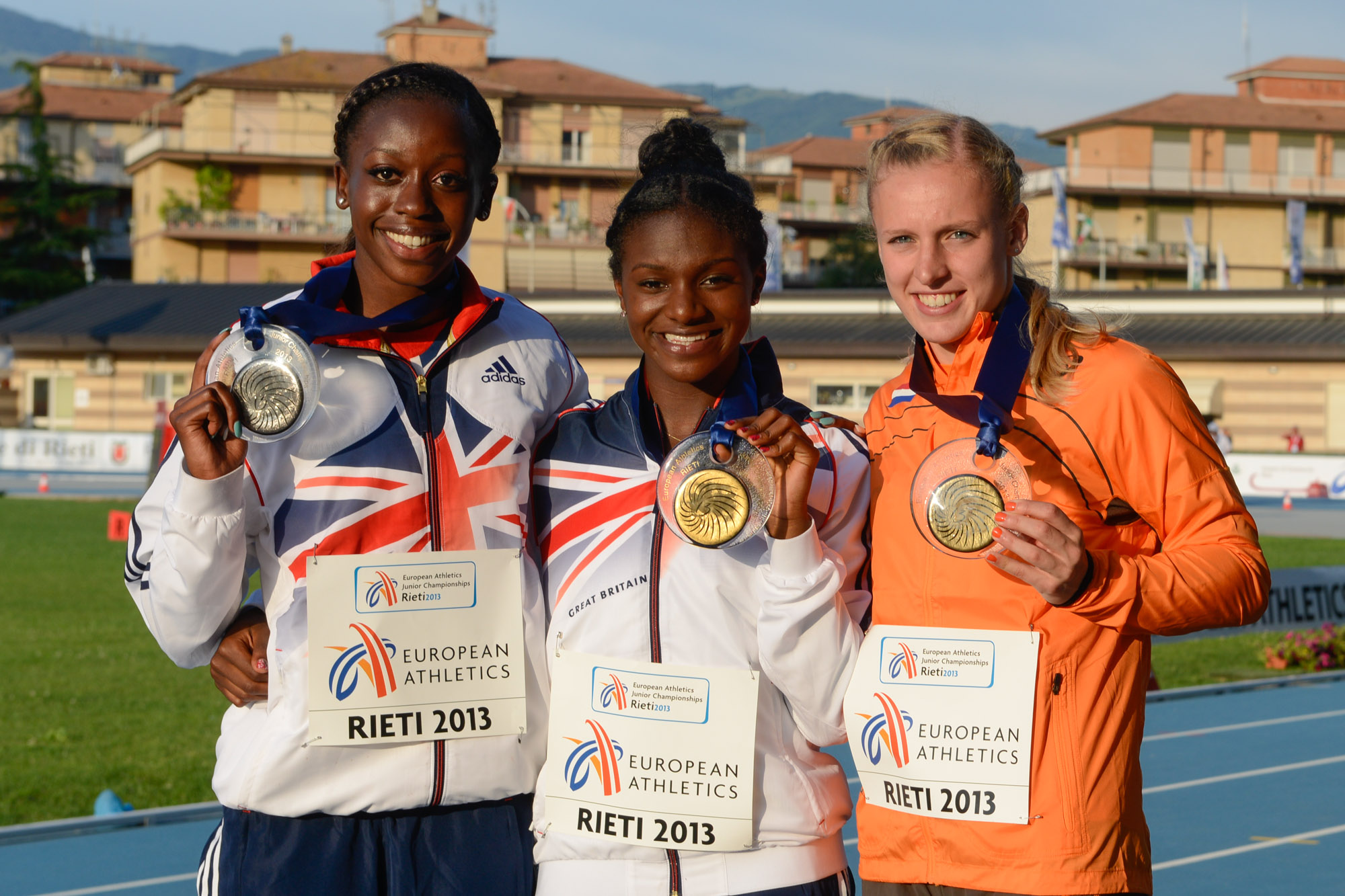
Asher-Smith (C) with her 200 m gold at the 2013 European Junior Championships in Rieti (IT).

At the 2012 World Junior Championships, Asher-Smith finished seventh in the 200 m final in a then personal best time of 23.50 seconds. She said afterwards that "I am elated to have made the final and achieve a PB in the process, and I'm looking ahead to next year in Italy."

In 2013, she earned two gold medals at the European Junior Championships in Rieti, winning the 200 m in 23.29 s, before joining Yasmin Miller, Steffi Wilson and Desiree Henry to win the 4 × 100 m relay and break the UK junior record. The British squad originally finished fourth in the final but were promoted to the bronze medal after the disqualification of the French team. Asher-Smith was shortlisted for the 2013 BBC Young Sports Personality of the Year.

At the 2014 World Junior Championships in Eugene, Asher-Smith won the 100 metres running 11.23 seconds.

== Professional athletics career ==
=== 2013–2015: Early career ===
Asher-Smith was part of the winning Great Britain team for the 4 × 100 m relay at the 2013 London Grand Prix meet and was the youngest athlete selected for the Great Britain and Northern Ireland Squad for the 2013 World Championships in Moscow. Along with teammates Annabelle Lewis, Ashleigh Nelson and Hayley Jones, she won a bronze medal in the 4 × 100 m relay.

At the 2014 European Athletics Championships in Zurich, she qualified for the 200 m final but pulled out with a hamstring injury on the bend.

She took the silver medal for the 60 m at the 2015 European Indoor Championships. It was the first time in 30 years that a British female won a medal in the event. In doing so, Asher-Smith equalled Jeanette Kwakye's British record of 7.08 s and, being 19 years old, became the fastest ever teenager at 60 m. She first broke the British 100 metres record with 11.02 s on 24 May in Hengelo, before becoming the first British woman to run a legal time under 11 seconds, with 10.99 s on 25 July at the London Anniversary Games. She then finished fifth in the 200 m at the 2015 IAAF World Championships in Beijing with a time of 22.07 s, a new British record.

=== 2016–2018: Olympic debut and triple European gold ===
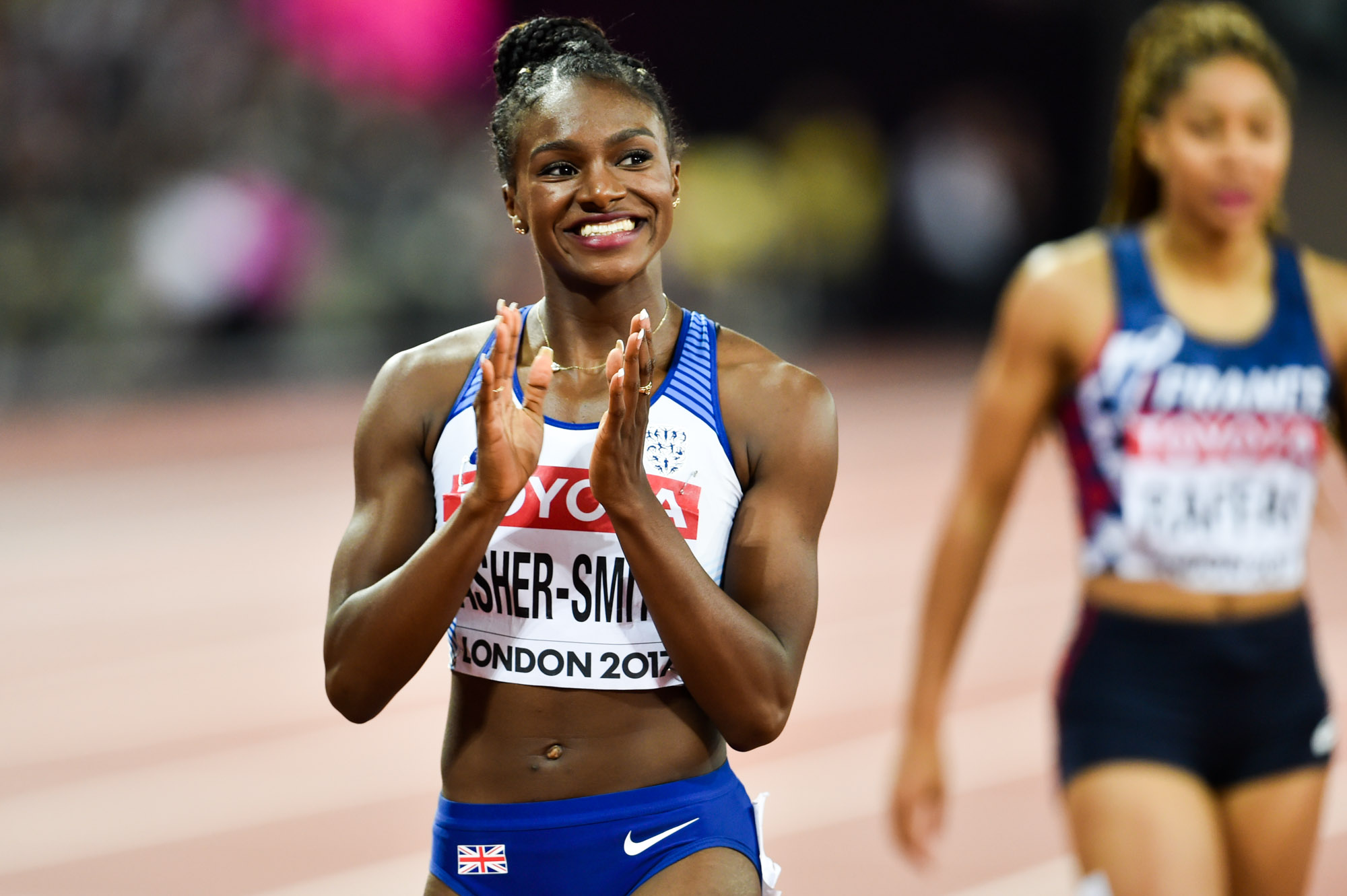
Dina Asher-Smith at the 2017 World Championships in London.

Asher-Smith won her first Diamond League at the 2016 BAUHAUS-galan in the 200 m. She won gold over the 200 m at the 2016 European Championships, clocking a time of 22.37 s in the final. She went on to win a silver in the 4 × 100 m relay. At the 2016 Summer Olympics in Rio de Janeiro, Asher-Smith finished fifth in the 200 metres, in a season's best of 22.31 seconds, then won a bronze medal with her teammates Asha Philip, Desiree Henry and Daryll Neita in the 4 × 100 m relay in a British record of 41.77 seconds.

On 17 February 2017, Asher-Smith broke her foot in a training accident, but still managed to secure fourth place in the women's 200 m and a silver medal as part of the Great Britain 4 × 100 m relay later that year at the World Championships in London.

In 2018, she went to Australia early to train and get used to the conditions prior to the Commonwealth Games scheduled to take place in Gold Coast, Queensland in that country. She qualified for the 200 m final, and came away with a bronze medal in a time off 22.29 seconds. England ladies, including Asher-Smith, qualified for the 4 × 100 m relay final, where they won gold in a time of 42.46 seconds, beating one of the favorites, Jamaica. She improved her British record in the 100 m to 10.92 s in placing second at the 2018 Oslo Diamond League. Three days later, she continued her good form by winning the Stockholm Diamond League in 10.93 s. At the 2018 European Championships in Berlin, Asher-Smith won both the 100 m and 200 m titles, improving her British records to 10.85 and 21.89 seconds respectively, becoming the first British woman in history to run below 22 seconds for 200 metres, and moving to 22nd on the 200 metres world all-time list (35th at 100 m). She won a third gold medal in the 4 × 100 m relay. Asher-Smith was named women's European Athlete of the Year for her success in October. She was later hailed by IAAF president Sebastian Coe as the next sprint sensation in athletics.

=== 2019–2021: World 200 m champion and Tokyo Olympics ===
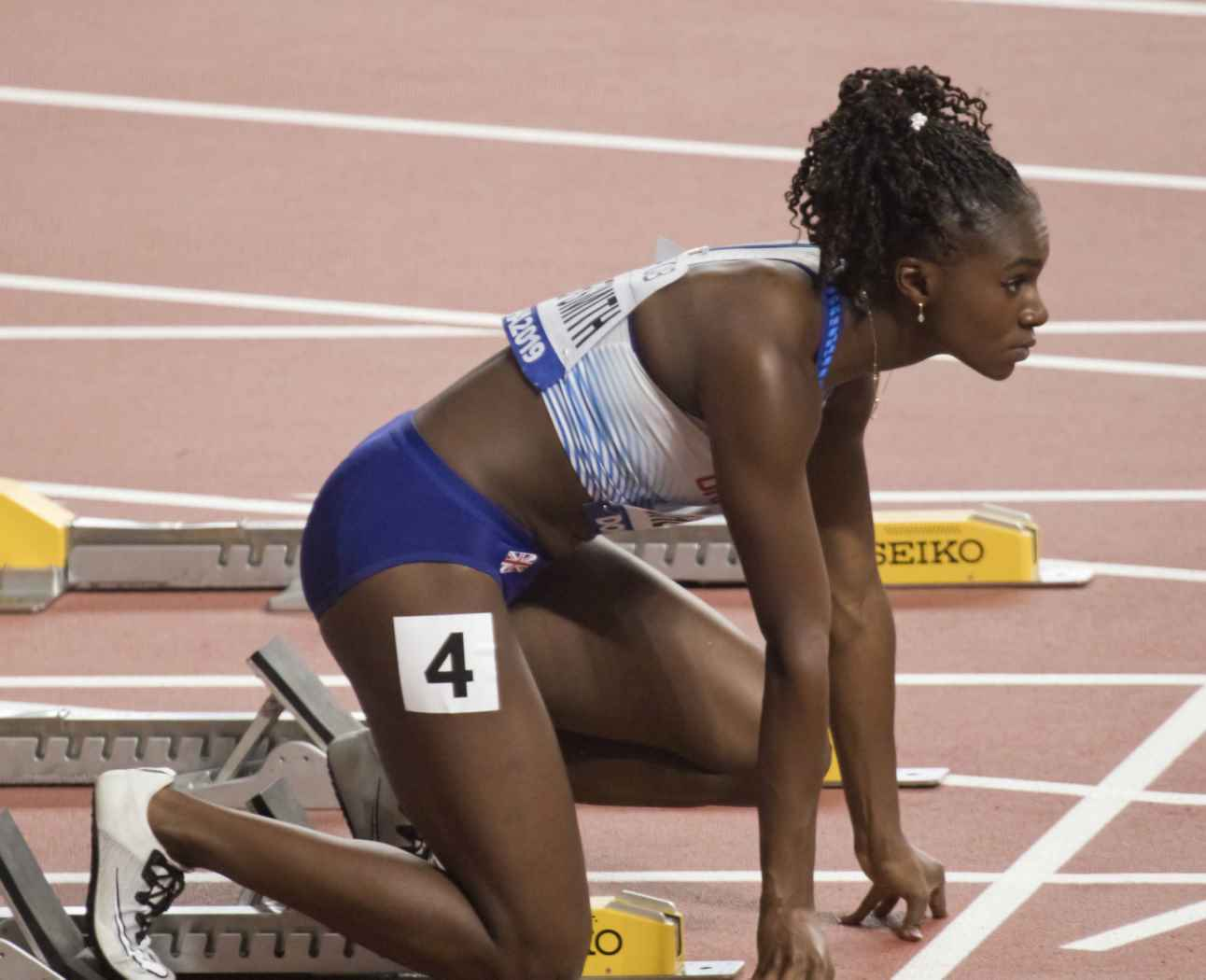
Asher-Smith in starting blocks at the 2019 World Championships in Doha.

Asher-Smith went into the 2019 IAAF World Championships in fine form, winning over 200 m at the Doha and Stockholm Diamond Leagues, and over 100 m at the Diamond League final in Brussels in a time of 10.88 s. She also placed second over 100 m at the Rome, Lausanne and London Diamond Leagues in times of 10.94 s, 10.91 s and 10.92 s respectively. At the World Championships, she won the silver medal in the 100 m at the World Championships in a new British record of 10.83 seconds, finishing second behind only Shelly-Ann Fraser-Pryce. She was the first female British sprinter to win, over 100 m or 200 m, an individual medal in the world championships since Kathy Cook in 1983. On 2 October, she became the World Champion in the 200 m, setting a personal best and new British record of 21.88 seconds.

Going into the 2021 season, Asher-Smith was a strong medal favourite for the short sprints at the 2020 Summer Olympics in Tokyo. Her season was off to a promising start in May when she won the women's 100 m final at the Gateshead Diamond League against a world class field, besting athletes such as Shelly-Ann Fraser-Pryce, Blessing Okagbare, Marie-Josée Ta Lou and Sha'Carri Richardson. She followed this up in late June when she won the 100 m final at the British Championships in a time of 10.97 seconds. The clock had originally reported 10.71 seconds, which would have been a substantial national record, however this was corrected a few minutes later.

She came into the Olympics having gained selection in the 100 m, 200 m and 4 × 100 m relay, however failed to qualify for the 100 m final after placing third in her semi-final in a time of 11.05 seconds, which was not enough to gain a fastest non-automatic qualifying spot. Subsequently, she revealed in an emotional interview that she had actually sustained a hamstring injury during the finals of the British Championships, and that she would be pulling out of the 200 m. Nevertheless, she managed to return to contribute to the 4 × 100 m relay, aiding Great Britain in setting a new national record of 41.55 seconds in their heat, followed by a bronze medal in the final behind Jamaica and the United States. She later bounced back to end her 2021 campaign with a seasons best of 22.04 seconds in the 200 m at the Brussels Diamond League, also setting a seasons best of 10.87 seconds in placing second in the 100 m at the Diamond League Final in Zürich.

=== 2022–2024: World bronze medallist and European 100 m champion ===
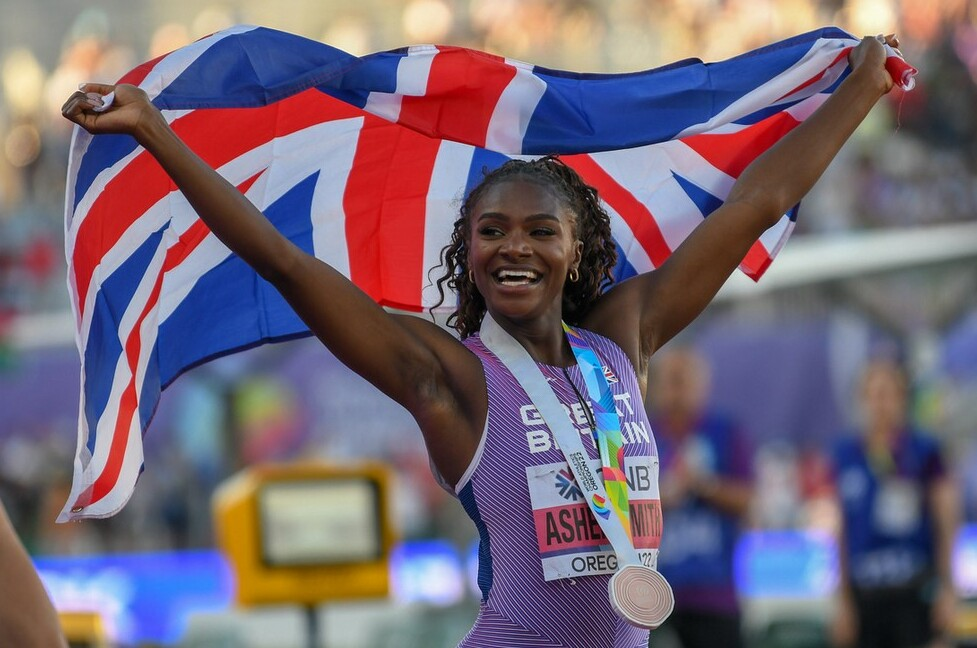
Asher-Smith after winning bronze over 200 m at the 2022 World Championships.

In 2022, Asher-Smith ran her first Diamond League of the season in Doha, placing third over 200 m behind Gabby Thomas and Shericka Jackson in a time of 22.37 s. She won the 100 m at the Birmingham Diamond League in a time of 11.11 s, narrowly beating out Shericka Jackson and Daryll Neita. At the 2022 British Athletics Championships, she was beaten by Neita in the 100 m. She recovered to win at the Stockholm Diamond League over 200 m, in a time of 22.37 s. At the World Athletics Championships in Eugene, Asher-Smith placed fourth in the 100 m, equalling her British record of 10.83 s. She went on to win a bronze medal in the 200 m, having run her first sub-22 second 200 m since 2019 in the semi-finals. However, in the 4 × 100 m relay, Asher-Smith pulled up with an injury around the bend, whilst she finished her leg, Britain lost ground and finished sixth. In August, she competed at the European Championships, in the 100 m, Asher-Smith struggled with cramp as she pulled up after 60 m and finished eighth in the final. She bounced back to win silver in the 200 m, finishing behind Mujinga Kambundji.

On 27 January 2023, Asher-Smith broke the British record for the 60 m, running 7.04 s in Karlsruhe. She broke the record again on 25 February, running 7.03 s in the heats of the World Indoor Tour Final in Birmingham, she went on to win the final in 7.05 s. She won the 100 m at the 2023 British Championships in a time of 11.06 s. On 23 July, Asher-Smith ran 10.85 s in finishing second at the London Athletics Meet, this time was just 0.02 s off of her national record. At the World Championships in Budapest, after a season impacted by minor injuries, Asher-Smith finished eighth in the 100 m final and seventh in the 200 m. She later explained that a nerve problem had impacted her performance. In October 2023, she announced that her coaching partnership of 19 years with John Blackie would end. She moved her base to Austin, Texas where she would be guided by Edrick Floreal.

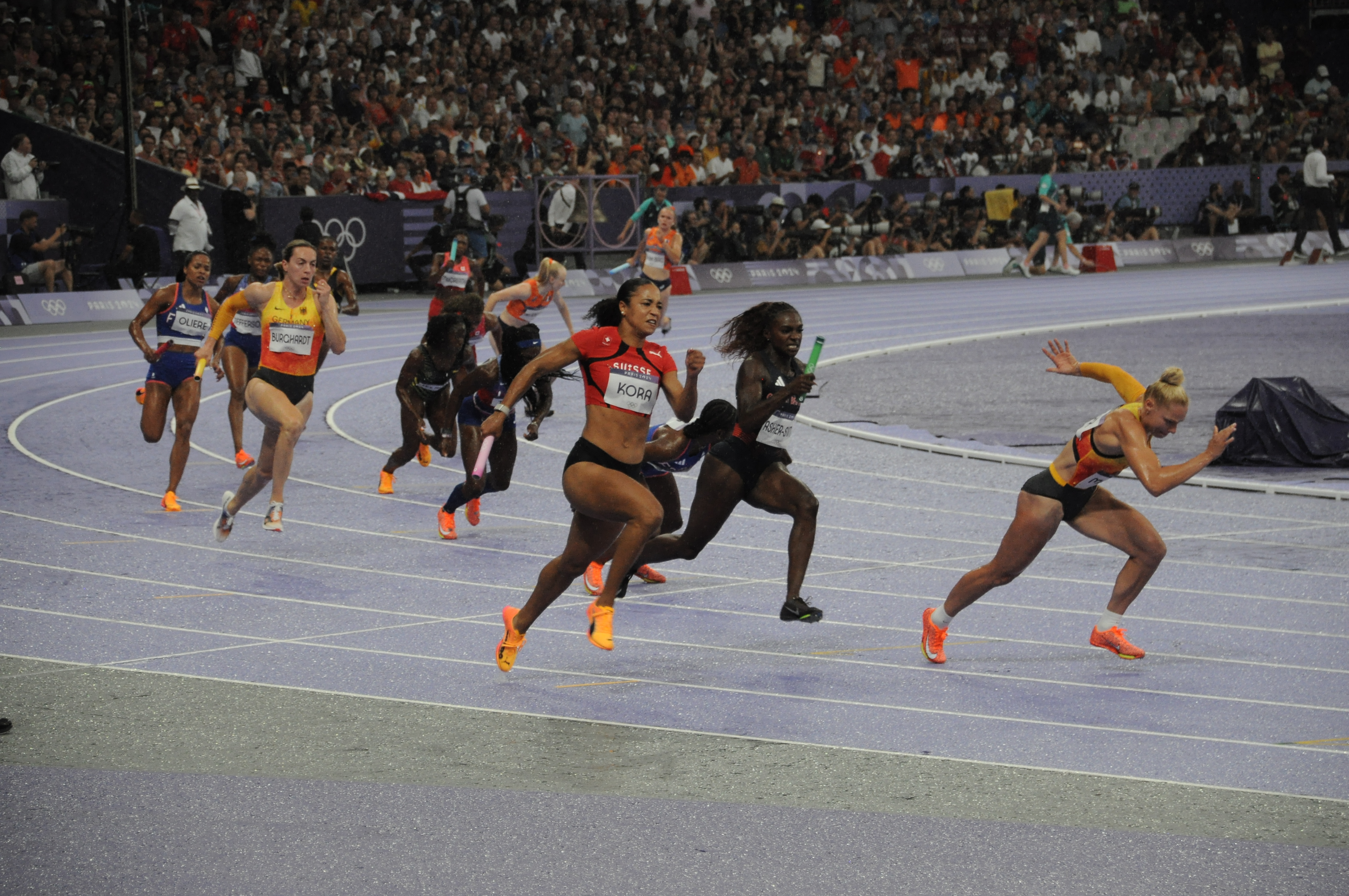
Asher-Smith (2nd to left) competing in the 4 × 100 m relay final at the 2024 Summer Olympics.

In 2024, Asher-Smith was selected for the British team at the European Championships, where she overcame a slow start to win the gold medal in the 100 m with a time of 10.99 s. She went on to win another gold medal as part of the 4 × 100 m relay team. After winning the gold medal in the 200 metres at the British Championships, Asher-Smith was subsequently named in the Great Britain team for the Paris Olympics. She was eliminated in the semi-final of the 100 m having run 11.10 seconds, and she finished fourth in the 200 m final in 22.22 seconds, narrowly denied the bronze medal by 2019 World Championship silver medallist Brittany Brown. Following the women's 200 m final, she told BBC Sport: "I feel good. It's been a long week and I'm proud of that performance. It was a really strong field. All the girls, across them, had so many strengths [...], and I was really proud to have held my own." Despite not winning a medal in an individual event, she won a silver medal in the 4 × 100 m relay, with teammates Imani Lansiquot, Amy Hunt and Daryll Neita. The team finished in 41.85 seconds.

Following the Paris Olympics, Asher-Smith competed in the 100 m at the Lausanne Diamond League, winning in a season's best time of 10.88 seconds—a time that would have won her the bronze medal in Paris. She continued her good form up by placing third over the same distance at the Zurich Diamond League. Asher-Smith ended her season at the Diamond League Final in Brussels, placing second behind training-partner Julien Alfred in 10.92 s.

=== 2025–present: Further success ===
Asher-Smith opened her outdoor season in the long sprints group at the Kingston Grand Slam Track, running a 400 m personal best of 52.15 s. She further improved her personal best to 52.13 s at the Texas Invitational on 25 April. She improved her season's best over 100 m to 10.93 s in finishing second at the Stockholm Diamond League on 15 June. She also finished second over 200 m at the London Diamond League on 19 July, running 22.25 s. At the British Championships, she won gold in a new championship record of 22.14 s, narrowly beating a fast-finishing Amy Hunt by 0.001 s. After the final, she revealed she had left Edrick Floreal's Texas training group and was now being coached in London. She finished second over 200 m and fourth over 100 m at the Diamond League Final in Zurich, with times of 22.18 and 10.94 s, respectively. At the World Championships in Tokyo, she finished eighth in the 100 m in 11.08 s, before finishing fifth over 200 m in 22.43 s. In the 4 × 100 m relay, she was part of the British team that finished fourth in the final.

On 1 February 2026, Asher-Smith won the 60 m at the Millrose Games in New York, finishing with a time of 7.10s. She won the British title over 60 m at the British Indoor Championships on 14 February, running 7.05 s in the final. At the World Indoor Championships, she placed seventh in the 60 m final, running 7.07 s. She had previously equalled her own British record of 7.03 s in the semi-final. She returned the following day to run in the 4×400 m relay alongside Tess McHugh, Louisa Stoney and Keely Hodgkinson as the quartet finished fifth. In June, Asher-Smith competed at the UK Championships, where she finished second behind Amy Hunt in the 100 m. It was the first time that Asher-Smith had been defeated in the British 100 m final, having won every other final she had competed in. On 18 July, she placed fourth over 200 m at the London Diamond League in a season's best of 22.28 s.

At the 2026 European Championships in Birmingham, she finished fifth in the 100 m final, running 11.10 s. She later won a bronze medal in the 200 m, running a time of 22.29 s to finish behind Hunt and Rhasidat Adeleke. Following the final, she stated "I'm disappointed to have a bronze, but I think 10 years after my first one it is such an achievement to be in a place to come back year after year". She won two golds competing in both the women's and mixed 4×100 m relays. Her gold in the mixed 4×100 m relay made her most decorated athlete in European Championships history, surpassing Irena Szewinska's previous total of ten medals. She also became the first athlete to win eight career gold medals at the European Championships.

== Other activities ==
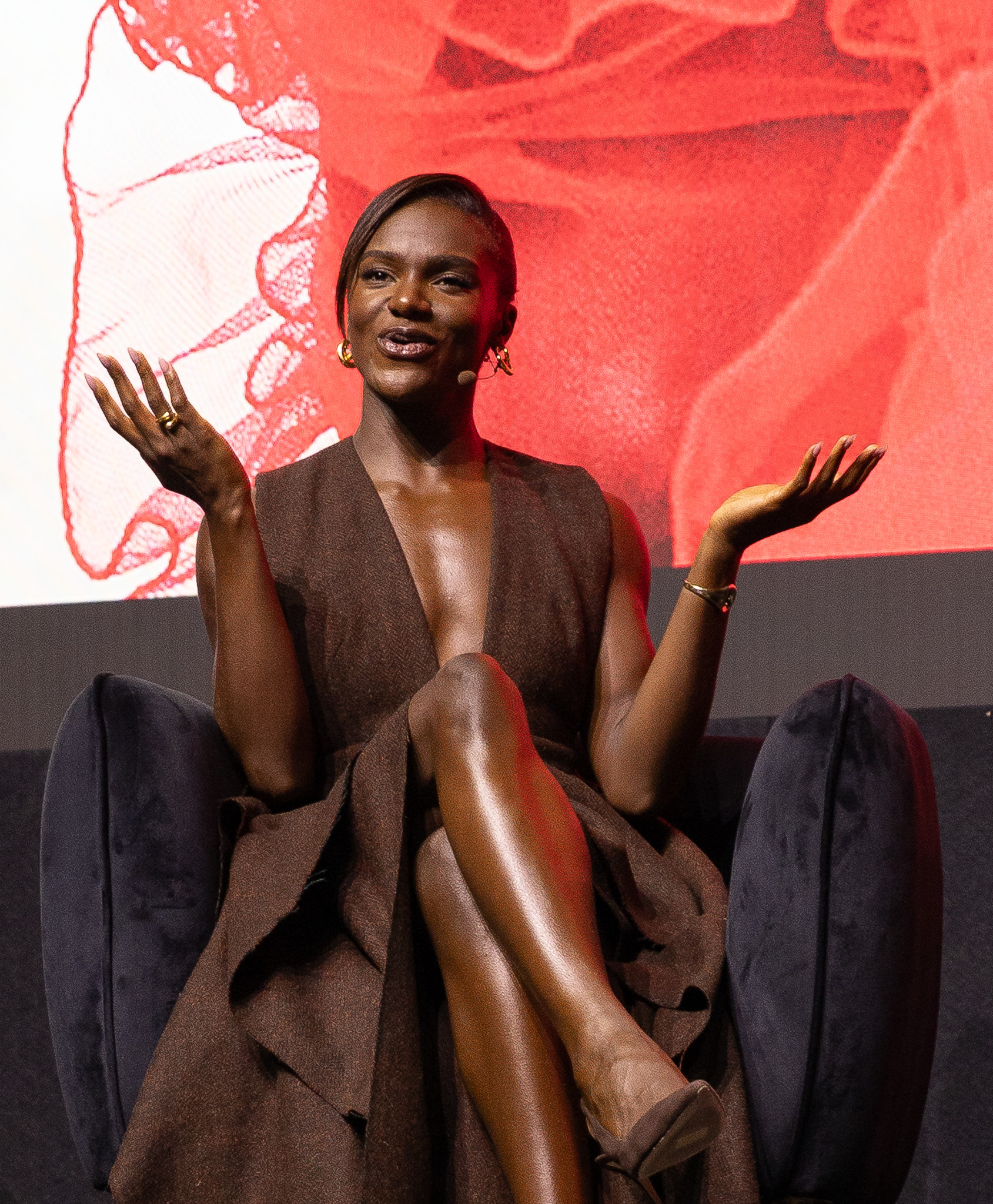
Asher-Smith speaking at SXSW London 2025

Asher-Smith has modelled for Louis Vuitton, Valentino and Off-White, and in 2019 had a Barbie created in her likeness. The same year, she made a cameo appearance in the music video for the single "Black" by Dave.

In April 2021, Asher-Smith's article ‘Think racism hasn't affected me? It's there almost every day’ won the AIPS (International Sports Press Association) Sports Media Award for Best Column of 2020. Asher-Smith described the unexpected award as her “first gold medal for writing”

In 2018, she was awarded an honorary doctorate from Canterbury Christ Church University, and in 2021, an honorary doctorate from the University of Kent. She also received an honorary doctorate from the University of Exeter in 2022. She was made an MBE for contribution to athletics in the 2025 New Year Honours.

== Achievements ==
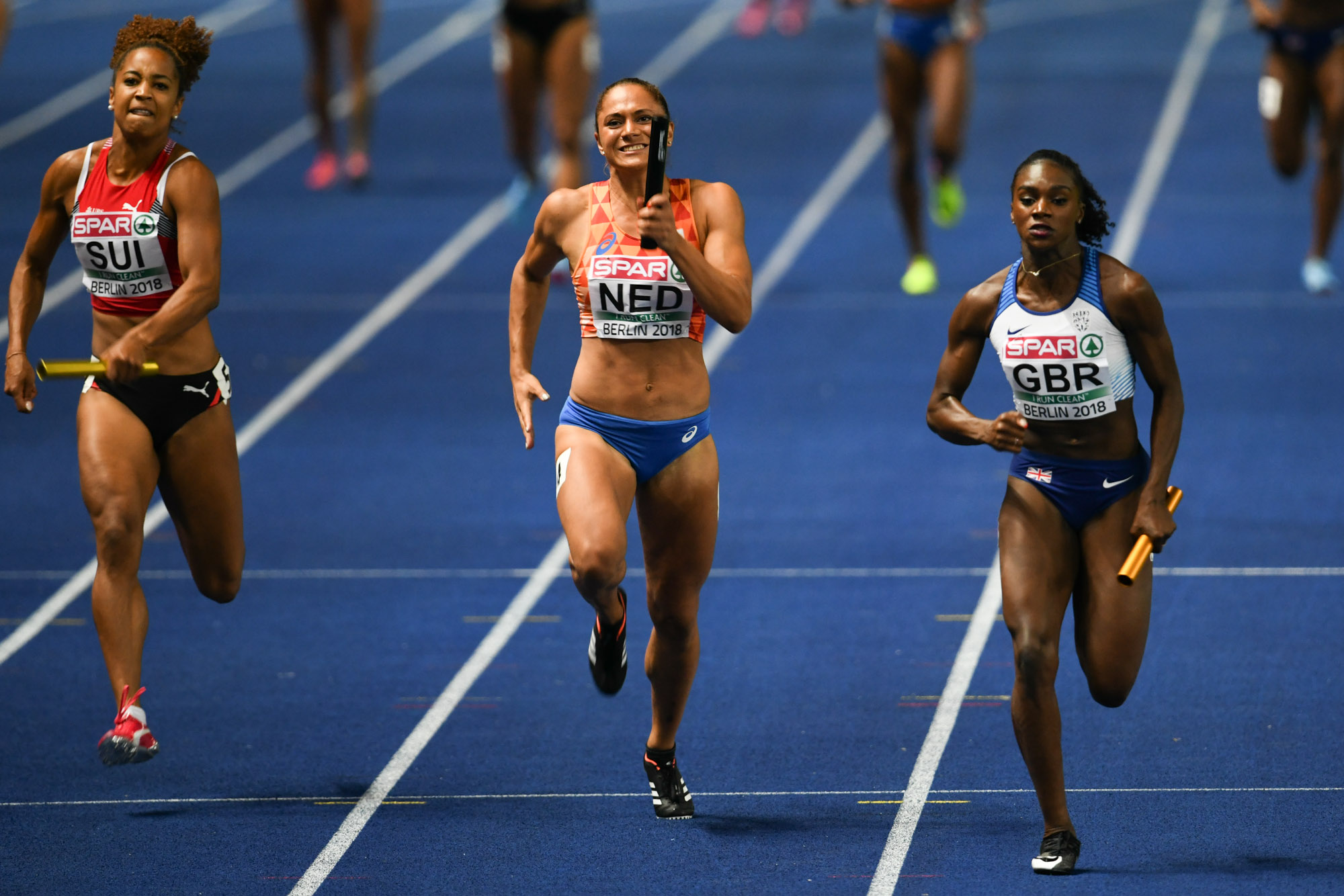
Asher-Smith (R) races in the 4 × 100 m relay at the 2018 European Championships in Berlin.

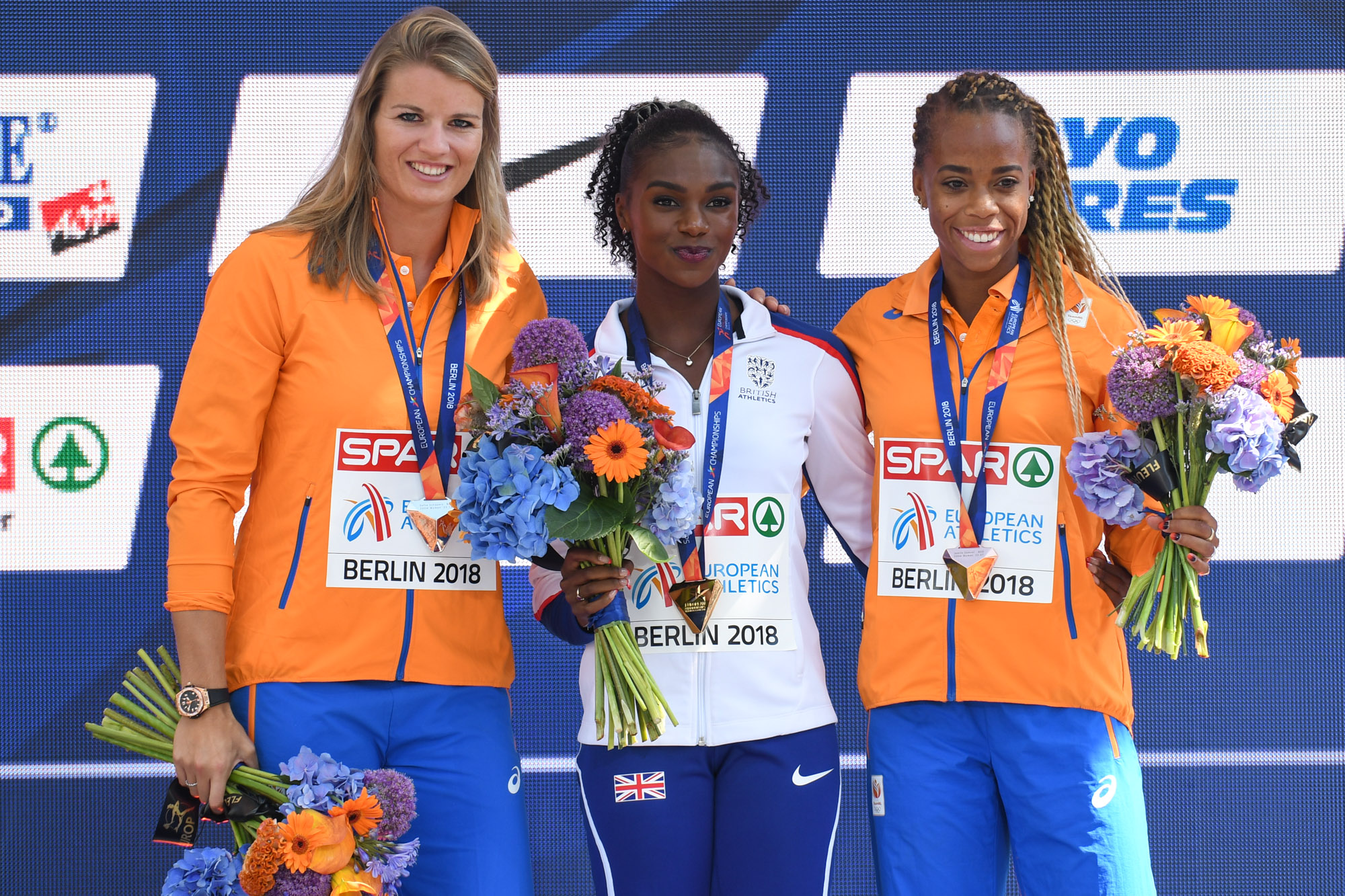
Asher-Smith (C) with her gold on the women's 200 m podium at the 2018 European Championships.

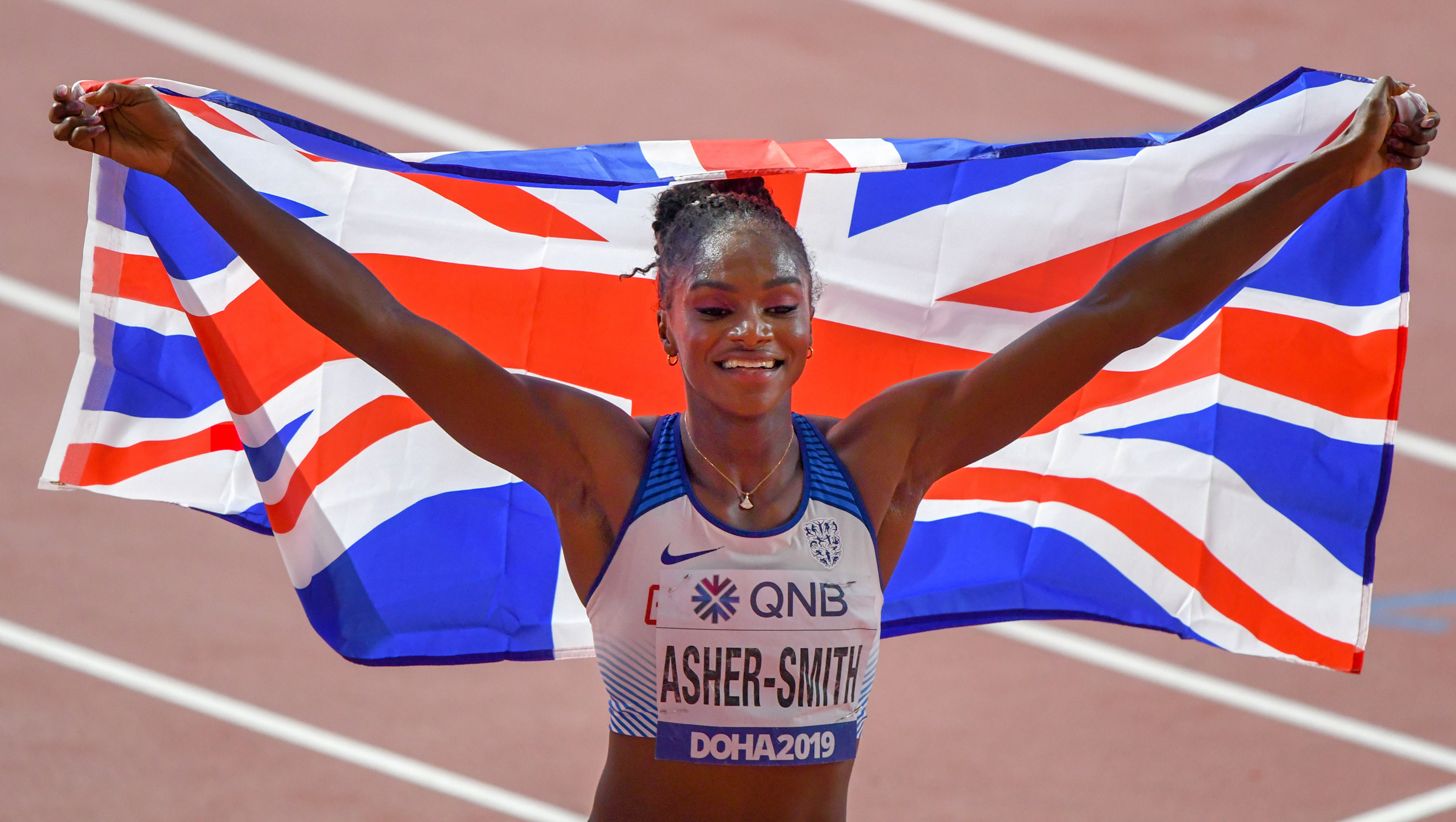
Asher-Smith celebrates her 200 m victory at the 2019 World Championships in Doha. With her earlier second-place finish in the 100 m it was her greatest career accomplishment.

=== Personal bests ===
Event	Time (s)	Wind (m/s)	Venue (m/s)	Date	Notes
60 metres indoor	7.03 i	—N/a	Birmingham, United Kingdom	25 February 2023	NR
100 metres	10.83	+0.1	Doha, Qatar	29 September 2019	NR
200 metres	21.88	+0.9	Doha, Qatar	2 October 2019	NR
300 metres	36.41	—N/a	London, United Kingdom	21 April 2022	Mx
4 × 100 m relay	41.55	—N/a	Tokyo, Japan	5 August 2021	NR
60 metres indoor U23	7.08 i	—N/a	Prague, Czech Republic	8 March 2015	NU23B
100 metres U23	10.99	+0.1	London, United Kingdom	25 July 2015	NU23R
100 metres U20	11.14	+1.5	Mannheim, Germany	5 July 2014	NU20R
200 metres U23	22.07	+0.2	Beijing, China	28 August 2015	NU23R
200 metres indoor U20	23.15 i	—N/a	Sheffield, United Kingdom	2 March 2014	AU20R

=== International competitions ===
Representing Great Britain
Year	Competition	Venue	Position	Event	Time	Notes
2011	Commonwealth Youth Games	Douglas, Isle of Man	1st	200 m	24.30	
2011	Commonwealth Youth Games	Douglas, Isle of Man	1st	4 × 100 m relay	46.19	
2012	World Junior Championships	Barcelona, Spain	7th	200 m	23.50	
2012	World Junior Championships	Barcelona, Spain	–	4 × 100 m relay	DNF	Pass failed
2013	European Junior Championships	Rieti, Italy	1st	200 m	23.29	
2013	European Junior Championships	Rieti, Italy	1st	4 × 100 m relay	43.81	NJR
2013	World Championships	Moscow, Russia	3rd	4 × 100 m relay	42.87	
2014	World Junior Championships	Eugene, United States	1st	100 m	11.23	
2014	European Championships	Zurich, Switzerland	–	200 m	DNF	Injury
2015	European Indoor Championships	Prague, Czech Republic	2nd	60 m	7.08	NR
2015	World Championships	Beijing, China	5th	200 m	22.07	NR
2015	World Championships	Beijing, China	4th	4 × 100 m relay	42.10	NR
2016	World Indoor Championships	Portland, United States	6th (sf)	60 m	7.11	DNS (Note: Time from the semi-finals; Asher-Smith qualified for the final but did not start.)
2016	European Championships	Amsterdam, Netherlands	1st	200 m	22.37	
2016	European Championships	Amsterdam, Netherlands	2nd	4 × 100 m relay	42.45	
2016	Olympic Games	Rio de Janeiro, Brazil	5th	200 m	22.31	
2016	Olympic Games	Rio de Janeiro, Brazil	3rd	4 × 100 m relay	41.77	NR
2017	World Championships	London, United Kingdom	4th	200 m	22.22	
2017	World Championships	London, United Kingdom	2nd	4 × 100 m relay	42.12	
2018	Commonwealth Games	Gold Coast, Australia	3rd	200 m	22.29	
2018	Commonwealth Games	Gold Coast, Australia	1st	4 × 100 m relay	42.46	
2018	European Championships	Berlin, Germany	1st	100 m	10.85	WL NR
2018	European Championships	Berlin, Germany	1st	200 m	21.89	WL NR
2018	European Championships	Berlin, Germany	1st	4 × 100 m relay	41.88	WL
2018	Continental Cup	Ostrava, Czech Republic	2nd	100 m	11.16	(Note: Representing Europe)
2018	Continental Cup	Ostrava, Czech Republic	2nd	4 × 100 m relay	42.55	(Note: Representing Europe)
2019	World Championships	Doha, Qatar	2nd	100 m	10.83	NR
2019	World Championships	Doha, Qatar	1st	200 m	21.88	NR
2019	World Championships	Doha, Qatar	2nd	4 × 100 m relay	41.85	
2021	Olympic Games	Tokyo, Japan	10th (sf)	100 m	11.05	
2021	Olympic Games	Tokyo, Japan	3rd	4 × 100 m relay	41.88	
2022	World Championships	Eugene, United States	4th	100 m	10.83	=NR
2022	World Championships	Eugene, United States	3rd	200 m	22.02	
2022	World Championships	Eugene, United States	6th	4 × 100 m relay	42.75	
2022	European Championships	Munich, Germany	8th	100 m	16.03	
2022	European Championships	Munich, Germany	2nd	200 m	22.43	
2022	European Championships	Munich, Germany	-	4 × 100 m relay	DNF	
2023	World Championships	Budapest, Hungary	8th	100 m	11.00	
2023	World Championships	Budapest, Hungary	7th	200 m	22.34	
2024	European Championships	Rome, Italy	1st	100 m	10.99	
2024	European Championships	Rome, Italy	1st	4 × 100 m relay	41.91	EL
2024	Olympic Games	Paris, France	10th (sf)	100 m	11.10	
2024	Olympic Games	Paris, France	4th	200 m	22.22	
2024	Olympic Games	Paris, France	2nd	4 × 100 m relay	41.85	SB
2025	World Championships	Tokyo, Japan	8th	100 m	11.08	
2025	World Championships	Tokyo, Japan	5th	200 m	22.43	
2025	World Championships	Tokyo, Japan	4th	4 × 100 m relay	42.07	
2026	World Indoor Championships	Toruń, Poland	7th	60 m	7.07	
2026	European Championships	Birmingham, United Kingdom	5th	100 m	11.10	
2026	European Championships	Birmingham, United Kingdom	3rd	200 m	22.29	
2026	European Championships	Birmingham, United Kingdom	1st	4 × 100 m relay	42.05	
2026	European Championships	Birmingham, United Kingdom	1st	Mixed 4 × 100 m relay	39.97 ER	

=== Circuit performances ===
Grand Slam Track results
Slam	Race group	Event	Pl.	Time	Prize money
2025 Kingston Slam	Long sprints	200 m	3rd	22.96	US$20,000
2025 Kingston Slam	Long sprints	400 m	8th	52.15	US$20,000
2025 Philadelphia Slam	Short sprints	200 m	4th	22.65	US$25,000
2025 Philadelphia Slam	Short sprints	100 m	5th	11.16	US$25,000

==== Wins and titles ====
- Diamond League champion 100 m: 2019
  - 2016 (1): Stockholm Bauhaus-Galan (200 m)
  - 2018 (1): Stockholm (100 m)
  - 2019 (3): Brussels Memorial Van Damme (100 m), Doha Diamond League (200 m), Stockholm (200 m)
  - 2021 (2): Gateshead British Grand Prix (100 m), Rome Golden Gala in Florence (200 m, MR)
  - 2022 (3): Birmingham Diamond League (100 m & 4 × 100 m relay), Stockholm (200 m)
- World Indoor Tour

60 metres wins

- 2023: Karlsruhe Init Indoor Meeting (WL =MR NR)

=== National titles ===
- British Athletics Championships
  - 100 metres: (5) 2015, 2018, 2019, 2021, 2023
  - 200 metres: (3) 2016, 2024, 2025
- British Indoor Athletics Championships
  - 60 metres: (1) 2015
  - 200 metres: (1) 2014

== See also ==
- 100 metres
- 100 metres at the World Athletics Championships
- 200 metres
- 200 metres at the World Athletics Championships
- List of World Championships in Athletics medalists (women)
- 2018 in 100 metres
