= Jazmine Moss =

British sprinter (born 2000)

Personal information
- Born: 16 August 2000 (age 26)

Sport
- Sport: Athletics
- Event: Sprint
- Club: Gateshead Harriers
- Coached by: Richard Kilty

Achievements and titles
- Personal bests: 60m: 7.55 (2025); 100m: 11.61 (2025); 200m: 23.42 (2025); 400m: 54.65 (2024)

Jazmine Moss (born 16 August 2000) is a British sprinter. She represented Great Britain at the 2026 World Athletics Indoor Championships in the women's 4 x 400 metres relay.

== Personal life ==
Originally from Durham, Moss attended Durham High School for Girls. Moss completed an undergraduate degree in Applied Sport and Exercise Science at Northumbria University before joining Loughborough University to complete a Masters degree in Strength and Conditioning.

In July 2023, Moss was caught speeding on the A1(M) motorway from Junction 61, Bowburn, to Junction 60, Bradbury. She was fined and given five penalty points on her license by Peterlee Magistrates Court.

== Athletics Career ==
Moss is a member of Gateshead Harriers and is trained by Richard Kilty. Moss was runner-up over 200 metres at the 2020 British Indoor Athletics Championships. In the winter of 2022, she ran 23.94 seconds for the 200 metres indoors, and placed third at the 2022 British Indoor Athletics Championships, also in 23.94 seconds.

Moss reached the final of the 200 metres at the 2025 British Indoor Athletics Championships in Birmingham, in February 2025, placing third overall. In July 2025, she won the 200 metres ahead of Katarina Johnson-Thompson at the England Athletics Championships in Birmingham. The following month, Moss qualified for the final of the 200 metres at the 2025 UK Athletics Championships in Birmingham, placing ninth overall.

In January 2026, Moss won the 400 metres at the Scottish Indoor Championships, with her time of 53.03 seconds a Championship Best, surpassing the previous record held by Jenny Meadows. Later that month, she improved to 52.83 seconds at the EAP Glasgow. Moss was a finalist over 400 metres at the 2026 British Indoor Athletics Championships in Birmingham, placing fifth overall. She was named in the British squad for the 2026 World Athletics Indoor Championships in Toruń, Poland. She ran in the women's 4 x 400 metres relay team on debut alongside Tess McHugh, Poppy Malik and Louisa Stoney, as they qualified for the final in a time of 3:29.31. In July, Moss won the 400 metres title at the 2026 England Athletics Championships.
