= Poppy Malik =

British athlete (born 2003)

Personal information
- Nationality: British (English)
- Born: 27 November 2003 (age 22)

Sport
- Country: Great Britain
- Sport: Track and field
- Event: 400 metres

Achievements and titles
- Personal bests: 400 m: 51.82 s (Birmingham, 2025)
Medal record
Women's athletics
Representing England
Commonwealth Games
Silver medal – second place	2026 Glasgow	4×400m Mixed
Representing Great Britain
European U23 Championships
Gold medal – first place	2025 Bergen	4x400 m relay
World U20 Championships
Bronze medal – third place	2022 Cali	4×400 m relay

Poppy Malik (born 27 November 2003) is a British sprinter who competes primarily over 400 metres.

== Early life ==
From Nottingham, and is of half-Pakistani descent. She attended South Nottinghamshire Academy and then Loughborough University.

== Career ==
Malik was part of the British 4x400 relay team which went on to win a bronze medal at the 2022 World Athletics U20 Championships in Cali, Colombia. She finished third behind winner Keely Hodgkinson at the England U23 Championship, over 400m in Chelmsford, in June 2023. In May 2024, she became British Universities and Colleges Sport (BUCS) outdoor champion over 400 metres. That month, she also won over that distance at the Loughborough International.

Malik was second behind Brooke Ironside in the 200 metres at the 2025 BUCS Indoor Championships in 23.67 seconds in February 2025. She qualified for the final of the women's 400 metres at the 2025 British Indoor Athletics Championships in Birmingham later that month. She was selected for the British team for the 2025 European Athletics Indoor Championships in Apeldoorn to compete individually and in the 4 × 400 m relay. In the individual 400 metres she ran an indoor personal best of 52.62 seconds. She competed at the 2025 World Athletics Relays in China in the Mixed 4 × 400 metres relay in May 2025. In June 2025, she ran a 400m personal best of 52.06 seconds in Geneva. She was named in the British team for the 2025 European Athletics U23 Championships in Bergen, placing fifth in the final of the 400 metres. Later in the championships, she ran as part of the gold medal winning British 4 x 400 metres relay team. On 3 August, she ran a personal best of 51.82 seconds for fifth in the final of the 400 metres at the 2025 UK Athletics Championships in Birmingham. She was selected for the British relay pool at the 2025 World Athletics Championships in Tokyo, Japan, where she ran in the women's x 400 metres relay. In October 2025, she was named on the British Athletics Olympic Futures Programme for 2025/26.

Malik was a finalist over 400 metres at the 2026 British Indoor Athletics Championships in Birmingham, placing fourth overall. She was subsequently named in the British squad for the 2026 World Athletics Indoor Championships in Toruń, Poland. She ran in the women's 4 x 400 metres relay team alongside Tess McHugh, Jazmine Moss and Louisa Stoney, as they qualified for the final in a time of 3:29.31.

Malik was named in the British squad for the 4 x 400 metres relay at the 2026 World Athletics Relays in Gaborone, Botswana. She ran as part of the women's 4 x 400 metres relay, placing fourth overall in the final. She was selected to represent England at the 2026 Commonwealth Games in Glasgow, winning the silver medal in the mixed 4 × 400 m relay.
