= Jenna James =

Canadian track and field athlete

Personal information
- Nationality: Canadian

Sport
- Sport: Track and field
- {{{event_type}}}: 400 meters, 400 meters hurdles
- College team: Iowa State Cyclones

Achievements and titles
- Personal bests: 400 m– 52.71i (Fayetteville 2026); 400 m hurdles – 56.71 (College Station 2025)

Jenna James (born July 8, 2003) is a Canadian track and field athlete who competes in the 400 meters and 400-meter hurdles.

== Athletic career ==
James attended Craig Kielburger Secondary School in Milton, Ontario, where she competed on their varsity track and field team. During her high school career, she was active in sprint and hurdle events and earned recognition in local and national competition for her performances.

James represented Canada at the 2022 World Athletics U20 Championships, competing in the 400 meters hurdles. She also placed second in the 400-meter hurdles at the Canadian U20 Championships, establishing herself as one of the country's top young hurdlers.

James began her collegiate career at the University of Oklahoma (2022–2025) before transferring to Iowa State University in 2025. She has earned All-American honors in NCAA competition and contributed to relay teams that set program records.

In 2025, James finished as the runner-up in the senior women's 400-meter hurdles at the Canadian Track and Field Championships, marking her transition to senior-level competition.

== Achievements ==
- NCAA Division I All-American, DMR Bronze (2026)
- NCAA Division I All-American Honorable Mention (2025)
- Silver medal – 400 m hurdles, Canadian Track and Field Championships (2025)
- Silver medal – 400 m hurdles, u20 Canadian Track and Field Championships (2022)

== International competitions ==
Representing Canada
Year	Competition	Venue	Event	Result
2022	2022 World Athletics U20 Championships	Cali, Colombia	400 m hurdles	33rd
2022	2022 World Athletics U20 Championships	Cali, Colombia	4 × 400 m relay	5th
