= 2022 World Athletics U20 Championships – Women's 4 × 400 metres relay =

Women's 4 × 400 metres relay at the 2022 World Athletics U20 Championships
- Venue: Estadio Olímpico Pascual Guerrero
- Dates: 5 August (heats); 6 August (final)
- Competitors: 71 from 16 nations
- Winning time: 3:28.06

Medalists
gold medal	Mekenze Kelley; Shawnti Jackson; Akala Garrett; Roisin Willis; Madison Whyte*; Zaya Akins*; Kennedy Wade*	United States
silver medal	Dejanea Oakley; Abigail Campbell; Oneika McAnnuff; Alliah Baker; Oneika Brissett*; Rickianna Russell*	Jamaica
bronze medal	Yemi Mary John; Jessica Astill; Ophelia Pye; Etty Sisson; Poppy Malik*	Great Britain

The women's 4 × 400 metres relay at the 2022 World Athletics U20 Championships was held at the Estadio Olímpico Pascual Guerrero in Cali, Colombia on 5 and 6 August 2022.

== Records ==
Standing records prior to the 2022 World Athletics U20 Championships
World U20 Record	United States	3:27.60	Grosseto, Italy	18 July 2004
Championship Record	United States	3:27.60	Grosseto, Italy	18 July 2004
World U20 Leading	United States	3:25.35	Walnut, United States	16 April 2022

== Results ==
=== Heats ===
Qualification: First 2 of each heat ( Q ) plus the 2 fastest times ( q ) qualified for the final.

Rank	Heat	Nation	Athletes	Time	Notes
1	1	United States	Mekenze Kelley, Madison Whyte, Zaya Akins, Kennedy Wade	3:32.94	Q, SB
2	1	Canada	Ella Clayton, Jenna James, Emily Martin, Savannah Sutherland	3:33.98	Q, SB
3	3	Finland	Ronja Koskela, Katriina Wright, Aada Aho, Veera Mattila	3:34.10	Q, NU20R
4	3	India	Summy, Priya Mohan, Rajitha Kunja, Rupal	3:34.18	Q, NU20R
5	2	Jamaica	Oneika Brissett, Abigail Campbell, Rickianna Russell, Oneika McAnnuff	3:34.92	Q, SB
6	2	Germany	Maja Schorr, Anna Hense, Justin Wehner, Lara-Noelle Steinbrecher	3:35.18	Q, SB
7	2	Great Britain	Poppy Malik, Jessica Astill, Ophelia Pye, Etty Sisson	3:35.22	q, SB
8	1	Australia	Jasmin Guthrie, Annie Pfeiffer, Isabella Guthrie, Txai Anglin	3:36.25	q, SB
9	1	South Africa	Precious Molepo, Anje Nel, Colleen Scheepers, Simone De Wet	3:36.52	NU20R
10	3	Nigeria	Osaretin Joy Usenbor, Opeyemi Deborah Oke, Josephine Oloye, Queen Usunobun	3:36.89	SB
11	2	Poland	Kornelia Lesiewicz, Martyna Guzowska, Aleksandra Wołczak, Martyna Trocholepsza	3:37.19	SB
12	3	Italy	Ngalula Kabangu, Martina Canazza, Zoe Tessarolo, Nancy Demattè	3:40.97	SB
13	1	Slovenia	Neža Dolenc, Veronika Sadek, Petja Klojčnik, Ana Rus	3:41.08	NU20R
14	3	Brazil	Leticia Quingostas, Camille Cristina De Oliveira, Taimara Pereira, Amanda Miranda Da Silva	3:44.70	SB
15	2	Czech Republic	Tereza Lamačová, Veronika Hutárková, Jana Piškulová, Adéla Tkáčová	3:47.72	
16	2	Ecuador	Selene Elizabeth Alban, Xiomara Ibarra, Dayanara Nazareno, Evelin Mercado	3:53.46	SB
	3	Sweden		DNS	

=== Final ===
The final was held on 6 August at 17:22.

Rank	Nation	Athletes	Time	Notes
1st place, gold medalist(s)	United States	Mekenze Kelley, Shawnti Jackson, Akala Garrett, Roisin Willis	3:28.06	SB
2nd place, silver medalist(s)	Jamaica	Dejanea Oakley, Abigail Campbell, Oneika McAnnuff, Alliah Baker	3:31.59	SB
3rd place, bronze medalist(s)	Great Britain	Yemi Mary John, Jessica Astill, Ophelia Pye, Etty Sisson	3:31.86	SB
4	Finland	Ronja Koskela, Katriina Wright, Aada Aho, Veera Mattila	3:33.15	NU20R
5	Canada	Ella Clayton, Jenna James, Emily Martin, Savannah Sutherland	3:33.60	SB
6	Australia	Ellie Beer, Isabella Guthrie, Txai Anglin, Jasmin Guthrie	3:34.86	SB
7	Germany	Maja Schorr, Anna Hense, Justin Wehner, Lara-Noelle Steinbrecher	3:34.95	SB
8	India	Summy, Priya Mohan, Rajitha Kunja, Rupal	3:36.72	
