= Louisa Stoney =

Welsh sprinter (born 2002)

Personal information
- Nationality: British (English)
- Born: 11 January 2002 (age 24)

Sport
- Sport: Athletics
- Event: Sprint
- Club: Belgrave Harriers

Achievements and titles
- Personal bests: 60m: 7.52 (2026); 100m: 11.86 (2025) 200m: 23.42 (2025); 400m: 51.83 (2026)

Louisa Stoney (born 11 January 2002) is a British sprinter who predominantly competes over 400 metres. She was runner-up at the 2026 British Indoor Athletics Championships and competed for Great Britain at the 2026 World Athletics Indoor Championships.

== Biography ==
Coached by Martin Rowe, Stoney won the women’s 200 metres in a personal best time of 24.48, and also placed second in the 60 metres final at the 2025 Welsh Indoor Athletics Championships.

Stoney ran a personal best for the 400 metres of 52.08 seconds to win the EAP Glasgow in January 2026, recording a faster time than Great Britain international Laviai Nielsen, amongst others. Stoney qualified for the final of the 400 metres at the 2026 British Indoor Athletics Championships in Birmingham on 14 February 2026, winning her heat ahead of Tess McHugh before running a personal best time of 51.92 seconds in her semi-final. In the final the following day, she finished second behind Yemi Mary John and ahead of 2025 World Indoor Champion Amber Anning in a personal best 51.83 seconds, with Stoney catching Anning on the line and both athletes credited with the same time. On 1 March, she finished second to Keely Hodgkinson over 400 metres at the Scottish Athletics Indoor Invitational.

Stoney was named in the British squad for the 2026 World Athletics Indoor Championships in Toruń, Poland. In the individual 400 metres she ran 52.24 seconds without advancing from her heat. She also ran in the women's 4 x 400 metres relay team alongside Jazmine Moss, Poppy Malik and Tess McHugh, as they qualified for the final in a time of 3:29.31, before returning for the final with McHugh, Keely Hodgkinson and Dina Asher-Smith, in which they placed fifth overall.

Stoney was named in the British squad for the 4 x 400 metres relay at the 2026 World Athletics Relays in Gaborone, Botswana. Competing in Nijmegen in the Netherlands in May 2026, she ran a new outdoor personal best for the 400 m, winning in 52.30. In June, she reached the final of the 400 metres at the 2026 British Championships, placing sixth overall.

== Personal life ==
Stoney attended Lady Eleanor Holles School, later graduating from Cardiff University.
