= 2022 World Athletics U20 Championships – Women's 400 metres hurdles =

Women's 400 metres hurdles at the 2022 World Athletics U20 Championships
- Venue: Estadio Olímpico Pascual Guerrero
- Dates: 2 August (heats); 3 August (semifinals); 4 August (final)
- Competitors: 44 from 34 nations
- Winning time: 56.16

Medalists
gold medal	Akala Garrett	United States
silver medal	Hanna Karlsson	Sweden
bronze medal	Michaela Rose	United States

The women's 400 metres hurdles at the 2022 World Athletics U20 Championships was held at the Estadio Olímpico Pascual Guerrero in Cali, Colombia on 2, 3 and 4 August 2022.

== Records ==
U20 standing records prior to the 2022 World Athletics U20 Championships were as follows:

Standing records prior to the 2022 World Athletics U20 Championships
World U20 Record	Sydney McLaughlin (USA)	53.60	Fayetteville, United States	27 April 2018
Championship Record	Lashinda Demus (USA)	54.70	Kingston, Jamaica	19 July 2002
World U20 Leading	Moa Granat (SWE)	57.12	Söderhamn, Sweden	26 July 2022

== Results ==
=== Round 1 ===
Qualification: First 3 of each heat (Q) and the 6 fastest times (q) qualified for the semifinals.

Rank	Heat	Lane	Name	Nationality	Time	Note
1	6	8	Ludovica Cavo	Italy	57.77	Q, PB
2	3	2	Michelle Smith	United States Virgin Islands	58.35	Q
3	3	4	Akala Garrett	United States	58.40	Q
4	4	4	Michaela Rose	United States	58.44	Q
5	6	5	Anje Nel	South Africa	58.52	Q, SB
6	1	3	Klara Koščak	Croatia	58.84	Q, NU20R
7	2	5	Isabella Guthrie	Australia	58.89	Q
8	1	5	Moe Matsuoka	Japan	58.90 [.898]	Q
9	4	8	Wiktoria Oko	Poland	58.90 [.900]	Q
10	6	6	Lara-Noelle Steinbrecher	Germany	58.95	Q
11	2	4	Alessia Seramondi	Italy	59.03	Q
12	2	2	Ophelia Pye	Great Britain	59.04	Q
13	6	1	Antonia Sánchez	Mexico	59.35	q, PB
14	5	3	Hanna Karlsson	Sweden	59.38	Q
15	5	7	Aleksandra Wołczak	Poland	59.39	Q
16	5	6	Oneika McAnnuff	Jamaica	59.45	Q
17	4	2	Vivienne Morgenstern	Germany	59.57	Q
18	1	6	Amanda Henriques	Denmark	59.62	Q, PB
19	5	5	Marin Stray Gautadottir	Norway	59.74	q, PB
20	4	3	Sofia Lavreshina	Portugal	59.88	q, PB
21	2	8	Andrea Švecová	Slovakia	1:00.07	q, PB
22	1	4	Vasiliki-Paraskevi Mitsiouli	Greece	1:00.20	q
23	2	6	Yaroslava Yalysovetska	Ukraine	1:00.29	q
24	6	2	Lucy Mcglynn	Ireland	1:00.30	
25	3	8	Simone De Wet	South Africa	1:00.35	Q
26	6	4	Ester Bendová	Czech Republic	1:00.40	
27	5	1	Neža Dolenc	Slovenia	1:00.44	
28	3	7	Esther Joseph	Nigeria	1:00.51	
29	6	7	Juliana Demeštšenko	Estonia	1:00.71	
30	3	5	Liliet Cabrera	Cuba	1:00.73	
31	4	6	Leticia Quingostas	Brazil	1:00.80	
32	3	3	Safhia Hinds	Jamaica	1:00.97	
33	5	8	Jenna James	Canada	1:00.99	
34	4	5	Gerda Kirkytė	Lithuania	1:01.00	
35	6	3	Anna Haberthür	Switzerland	1:01.72	
36	5	2	Amesha Piumanthi Hettirachchi Hettiarachchilage	Sri Lanka	1:02.11	
37	2	7	Anja Ramić	Croatia	1:02.28	
38	2	3	Simmy	India	1:02.58	
39	1	8	Ema Sarafinaitė	Lithuania	1:02.71	
40	3	6	Sita Sibiri	Burkina Faso	1:03.52	
41	5	4	Juliana Katerine Garces	Colombia	1:04.20	
42	1	2	Savannah Sutherland	Canada	1:04.46	
43	1	7	Camille Cristina De Oliveira	Brazil	1:10.73	
	4	7	Aada Aho	Finland	DQ	TR22.6.1

=== Semifinals ===
Qualification: First 2 of each heat (Q) and the 2 fastest times (q) qualified for the final.

Rank	Heat	Lane	Name	Nationality	Time	Note
1	1	3	Akala Garrett	United States	57.28	Q, PB
2	1	6	Hanna Karlsson	Sweden	57.34	Q, PB
3	2	4	Anje Nel	South Africa	57.76	Q, SB
4	1	4	Ludovica Cavo	Italy	57.78	q
5	3	4	Michaela Rose	United States	57.83 [.821]	Q
6	2	6	Michelle Smith	United States Virgin Islands	57.83 [.826]	Q, NU20R
7	2	3	Alessia Seramondi	Italy	58.07	q
8	3	5	Wiktoria Oko	Poland	58.28	Q
9	3	3	Moe Matsuoka	Japan	58.30 [.294]	
10	1	5	Aleksandra Wołczak	Poland	59.39 [.299]	
11	3	6	Klara Koščak	Croatia	58.40	NU20R
12	2	8	Ophelia Pye	Great Britain	58.49	
13	1	1	Antonia Sánchez	Mexico	58.74	PB
14	1	8	Lara-Noelle Steinbrecher	Germany	58.77	
15	3	7	Vivienne Morgenstern	Germany	59.23	
16	2	1	Marin Stray Gautadottir	Norway	59.62	PB
17	3	8	Oneika McAnnuff	Jamaica	59.74	
18	1	7	Simone De Wet	South Africa	59.85	
19	2	2	Vasiliki-Paraskevi Mitsiouli	Greece	59.97	
20	2	7	Amanda Henriques	Denmark	1:00.47	
21	1	2	Yaroslava Yalysovetska	Ukraine	1:00.71	
22	3	2	Sofia Lavreshina	Portugal	1:00.85	
23	3	1	Andrea Švecová	Slovakia	1:01.11	
	2	5	Isabella Guthrie	Australia	DQ	TR22.6.1

=== Final ===
The final was held on 4 August at 17:14

Rank	Lane	Name	Nationality	Time	Note
1st place, gold medalist(s)	6	Akala Garrett	United States	56.16	WU20L
2nd place, silver medalist(s)	3	Hanna Karlsson	Sweden	56.71	PB
3rd place, bronze medalist(s)	4	Michaela Rose	United States	56.86	PB
4	5	Anje Nel	South Africa	57.47	PB
5	7	Michelle Smith	United States Virgin Islands	57.48	NU20R
6	8	Wiktoria Oko	Poland	58.56	
7	1	Ludovica Cavo	Italy	58.72	
8	2	Alessia Seramondi	Italy	1:01.78	
