= Akala Garrett =

American athlete (born 2005)

Personal information
- Nationality: American
- Born: May 10, 2005 (age 21)

Sport
- Sport: Track and field
- Event(s): Hurdling, Sprinting

Achievements and titles
- Personal best(s): 400 mH: 53.32 (Eugene, 2026)
Medal record
Women's athletics
Representing United States
World U20 Championships
Gold medal – first place	2022 Cali	400m hurdles
Gold medal – first place	2022 Cali	4x400 m relay

Akala Garrett (born May 10, 2005) is an American track and field athlete. She won gold medals at the 2022 World Junior Championships in the 400 metres hurdles and the 4 × 400 m relay.

== Early life ==
Garrett attended Harding University High School in Charlotte, North Carolina. She is coached by her mother, former track athlete LaSonja Collins.

== Career ==
Garrett was the Gatorade's North Carolina Girls Track & Field Player of the Year in 2021, and 2022. She won the 100m hurdles and the 400m hurdles at the 2022 USATF U20 Outdoor Championships at Hayward Field in Eugene, Oregon, running 10.91 for the 100 m hurdles and 57.47 for the 400 m hurdles. She had won the 400 m hurdles the year previously also.

She won the 2022 World Junior Championships in the 400 m hurdles and dedicated the win to her former high school principal, Eric Ward. Her time of 56.16 was a world leading U20 time. She finished half a second ahead of nearest rival, Hanna Karlsson of Sweden. She doubled up and also won gold in the 4x400 m relay at the event in Cali, Colombia.

Representing the Texas Longhorns women's track and field team, she won the 400 metres hurdles at the SEC Championships in Lexington, Kentucky in May 2025, in a time of 54.84 seconds. She finished runner-up to Savannah Sutherland at the 2025 NCAA Outdoor Championships in June 2025 in Eugene, Oregon.

She qualified for the final of the 400 metres hurdles at the 2025 USA Outdoor Track and Field Championships, placing fourth in 55.66 seconds.

Garrett transferred to the South Carolina Gamecocks track and field team for the 2026 season. In May 2026, Garrett ran 54.02 to win the 400 m hurdles at the SEC Championships. On 13 June, Garrett ran a personal best 53.32 seconds, sixth on the NCAA all-time list, to win the women's 400 meters hurdles at the 2026 NCAA Outdoor Championships.
